= 2012 Moto3 World Championship =

1st running of the Moto3 World Championship

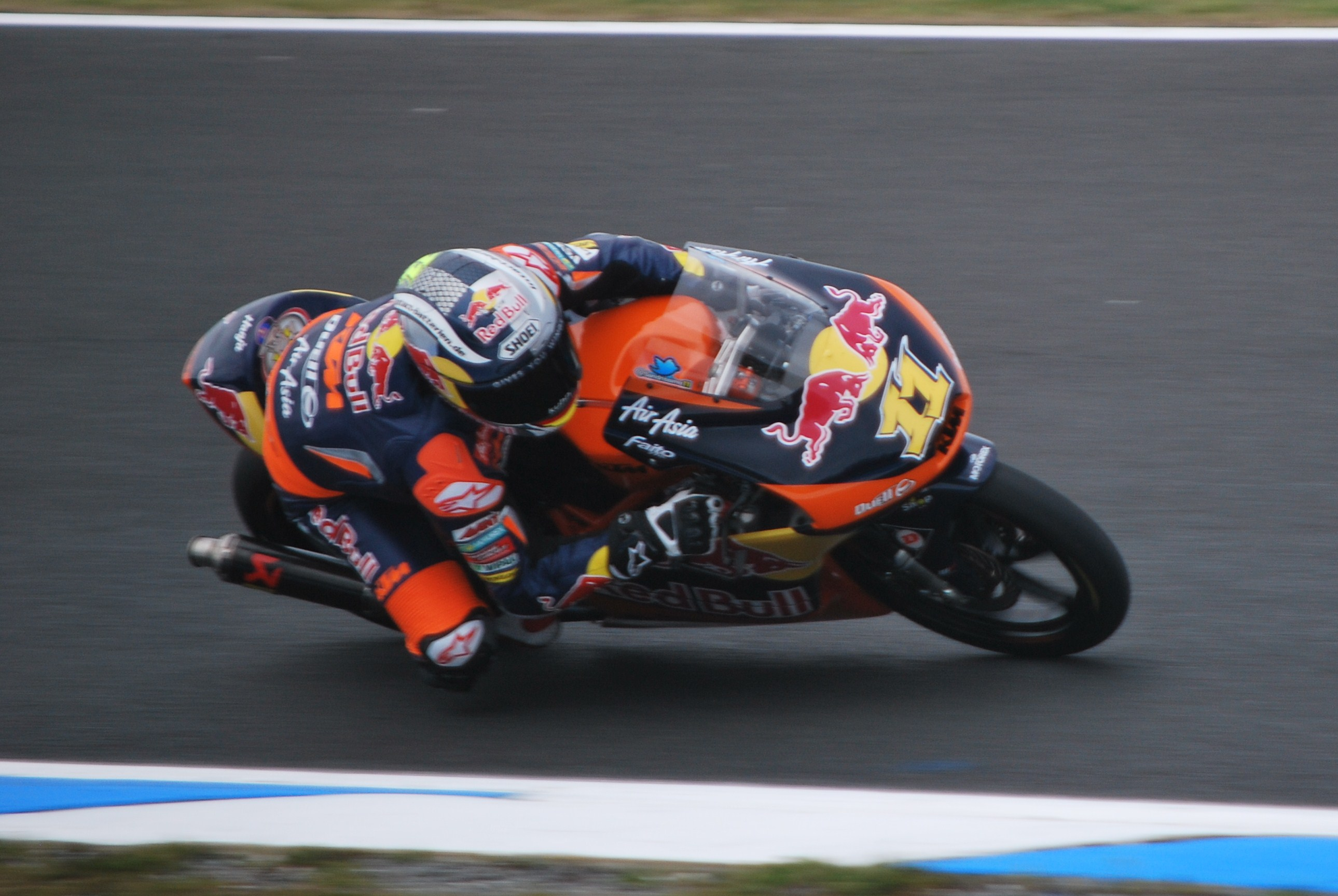
Sandro Cortese was the 2012 Moto3 World Riders' Champion.

The 2012 FIM Moto3 World Championship was the lightweight class of the 64th Fédération Internationale de Motocyclisme (FIM) Road Racing World Championship season. It was the inaugural season of Moto3.

== Season summary ==
The inaugural Moto3 world championship title went to German rider Sandro Cortese, following his fourth victory of the season at the Malaysian Grand Prix, which gave him an unassailable points lead over his two title rivals Luis Salom and Maverick Viñales in the championship race. Cortese also became the first rider to win any Grand Prix title for the Austrian manufacturer KTM. KTM also won the constructors' championship at the Australian Grand Prix, doing so after Cortese won the race.

== Class changes ==
The 2012 season also saw the introduction of four-stroke bikes in the new Moto3 class.

== Calendar ==
The following Grands Prix were scheduled to take place in 2012:

The Fédération Internationale de Motocyclisme released an 17-race provisional calendar on 14 September 2011. Another provisional calendar was released three months later, with the Qatar Grand Prix moved forward by a week.

Round	Date	Grand Prix	Circuit
1	8 April ‡	Commercialbank Grand Prix of Qatar	Lusail International Circuit, Lusail
2	29 April	(Spain) Gran Premio bwin de España	Circuito de Jerez, Jerez de la Frontera
3	6 May	Grande Prémio de Portugal Circuito Estoril	Circuito do Estoril, Estoril
4	20 May	Monster Energy Grand Prix de France	Bugatti Circuit, Le Mans
5	3 June	(Catalonia) Gran Premi Aperol de Catalunya	Circuit de Barcelona-Catalunya, Montmeló
6	17 June	(United Kingdom) Hertz British Grand Prix	Silverstone Circuit, Silverstone
7	30 June ††	(Netherlands) Iveco TT Assen	TT Circuit Assen, Assen
8	8 July	(Germany) eni Motorrad Grand Prix Deutschland	Sachsenring, Hohenstein-Ernstthal
9	15 July	(Italy) Gran Premio d'Italia TIM	Mugello Circuit, Scarperia e San Piero
10	19 August	Red Bull Indianapolis Grand Prix	Indianapolis Motor Speedway, Speedway
11	26 August	(Czech Republic) bwin Grand Prix České republiky	Brno Circuit, Brno
12	16 September	Gran Premio Aperol di San Marino e Della Riviera di Rimini	Misano World Circuit, Misano Adriatico
13	30 September	(Aragon) Gran Premio Iveco de Aragón	MotorLand Aragón, Alcañiz
14	14 October	AirAsia Grand Prix of Japan	Motegi Circuit, Motegi
15	21 October	(Malaysia) Malaysian Motorcycle Grand Prix	Sepang International Circuit, Sepang
16	28 October	(Australia) AirAsia Australian Grand Prix	Phillip Island Grand Prix Circuit, Phillip Island
17	11 November	(Valencian Community) Gran Premio Generali de la Comunitat Valenciana	Circuit Ricardo Tormo, Valencia

‡ = Night race
†† = Saturday race

=== Calendar changes ===
- The Czech Republic and Indianapolis Grand Prix swapped places.

== Teams and riders ==
- A provisional entry list was released by the Fédération Internationale de Motocyclisme on 13 January 2012. All teams used Dunlop tyres.

Team	Constructor	Motorcycle	No.	Rider	Rounds
(Italy) Ioda Team Italia (Italy) IodaRacing Project	Ioda	Ioda TR002	3	(Italy) Luigi Morciano	1–13, 17
(Italy) Ioda Team Italia (Italy) IodaRacing Project	Ioda	Ioda TR002	80	(Italy) Armando Pontone	3, 10–17
(Italy) Ioda Team Italia (Italy) IodaRacing Project	Ioda	Ioda TR002	94	(Germany) Jonas Folger	1, 4–9
(Italy) Team Italia FMI	FTR Honda	FTR M312	5	(Italy) Romano Fenati	All
(Italy) Team Italia FMI	FTR Honda	FTR M312	19	(Italy) Alessandro Tonucci	All
(Germany) TT Motion Events Racing	KTM	KTM RC250GP	6	(Spain) Joan Olivé	3, 11
(Germany) TT Motion Events Racing	KTM	KTM RC250GP	31	(Finland) Niklas Ajo	1–2, 4–10, 12–17
(Spain) JHK T-shirt Laglisse (Spain) JHK Laglisse	Honda	Honda NSF250R	7	(Spain) Efrén Vázquez	1
(Spain) JHK T-shirt Laglisse (Spain) JHK Laglisse	Honda	Honda NSF250R	26	(Spain) Adrián Martín	1
(Spain) JHK T-shirt Laglisse (Spain) JHK Laglisse	FTR Honda	FTR M312	7	(Spain) Efrén Vázquez	2–17
(Spain) JHK T-shirt Laglisse (Spain) JHK Laglisse	FTR Honda	FTR M312	26	(Spain) Adrián Martín	2–17
(Italy) Caretta Technology	Honda	Honda NSF250R	8	(Australia) Jack Miller	1–2, 4–10, 12–17
(Italy) Caretta Technology	Honda	Honda NSF250R	10	(France) Alexis Masbou	1–11
(Italy) Caretta Technology	Honda	Honda NSF250R	71	(Italy) Michael Ruben Rinaldi	11–12
(Italy) Caretta Technology	Honda	Honda NSF250R	73	(Italy) Manuel Tatasciore	3
(Italy) Caretta Technology	KRP Honda	KRP M3-01	17	(United Kingdom) John McPhee	13–17
(Germany) Cresto Guide MZ Racing (Germany) MZ Racing	MZ-RE Honda	MZ Moto3	9	(Germany) Toni Finsterbusch	1
(Germany) Cresto Guide MZ Racing (Germany) MZ Racing	MZ FTR	FTR M312	9	(Germany) Toni Finsterbusch	2
(Germany) Cresto Guide MZ Racing (Germany) MZ Racing	Honda	Honda NSF250R	9	(Germany) Toni Finsterbusch	3–4, 6–11
Racing Team Germany	Honda	Honda NSF250R	9	(Germany) Toni Finsterbusch	12–17
Racing Team Germany	FTR Honda	FTR M312	96	(France) Louis Rossi	All
(Finland) Red Bull KTM Ajo	KTM	KTM RC250GP	11	(Germany) Sandro Cortese	All
(Finland) Red Bull KTM Ajo	KTM	KTM RC250GP	52	(United Kingdom) Danny Kent	All
(Finland) Red Bull KTM Ajo	KTM	KTM RC250GP	61	(Australia) Arthur Sissis	All
(Finland) AirAsia-SIC-Ajo	KTM	KTM RC250GP	63	(Malaysia) Zulfahmi Khairuddin	All
(Italy) Ambrogio Next Racing	Suter Honda	Suter MMX3	12	(Spain) Álex Márquez	10–17
(Italy) Ambrogio Next Racing	Suter Honda	Suter MMX3	15	(Italy) Simone Grotzkyj	4–9
(Italy) Ambrogio Next Racing	Suter Honda	Suter MMX3	30	(Switzerland) Giulian Pedone	4–17
(Italy) Ambrogio Next Racing	Oral	Oral M3	15	(Italy) Simone Grotzkyj	1–3
(Italy) Ambrogio Next Racing	Oral	Oral M3	30	(Switzerland) Giulian Pedone	2–3
(Spain) Estrella Galicia 0,0	Suter Honda	Suter MMX3	12	(Spain) Álex Márquez	2–3, 5
(Spain) Estrella Galicia 0,0	Suter Honda	Suter MMX3	42	(Spain) Álex Rins	All
(Spain) Estrella Galicia 0,0	Suter Honda	Suter MMX3	44	(Portugal) Miguel Oliveira	All
(United Kingdom) Racing Steps Foundation KRP	KRP Honda	KRP M3-01	17	(United Kingdom) John McPhee	5–6, 11
(United Kingdom) Racing Steps Foundation KRP	KRP Honda	KRP M3-01	79	(United Kingdom) Fraser Rogers	6
(India) Mahindra Racing	Mahindra	Mahindra MGP3O	20	(Italy) Riccardo Moretti	9–11, 14–16
(India) Mahindra Racing	Mahindra	Mahindra MGP3O	77	(Germany) Marcel Schrötter	1–8
(India) Mahindra Racing	Mahindra	Mahindra MGP3O	95	(Czech Republic) Miroslav Popov	11–13, 17
(India) Mahindra Racing	Mahindra	Mahindra MGP3O	99	(United Kingdom) Danny Webb	1–10, 12–17
(Spain) Andalucia JHK Laglisse	FTR Honda	FTR M312	21	(Spain) Iván Moreno	1–9
(Spain) Andalucia JHK Laglisse	FTR Honda	FTR M312	23	(Spain) Alberto Moncayo	10–16
(Spain) Andalucia JHK Laglisse	FTR Honda	FTR M312	55	(Spain) Héctor Faubel	17
(Netherlands) Dutch Racing Team	Honda	Honda NSF250R	22	(Netherlands) Bryan Schouten	7
(Spain) Bankia Aspar Team (Spain) Mapfre Aspar Team Moto3	Kalex KTM	Kalex KTM	23	(Spain) Alberto Moncayo	1–9
(Spain) Bankia Aspar Team (Spain) Mapfre Aspar Team Moto3	Kalex KTM	Kalex KTM	29	(Germany) Luca Amato	13–17
(Spain) Bankia Aspar Team (Spain) Mapfre Aspar Team Moto3	Kalex KTM	Kalex KTM	55	(Spain) Héctor Faubel	1–12
(Spain) Bankia Aspar Team (Spain) Mapfre Aspar Team Moto3	Kalex KTM	Kalex KTM	94	(Germany) Jonas Folger	10–17
(Spain) Blusens Avintia Repsol	FTR Honda	FTR M312	25	(Spain) Maverick Viñales	All
(Italy) San Carlo Gresini Moto3	Honda	Honda NSF250R	27	(Italy) Niccolò Antonelli	1
(Italy) San Carlo Gresini Moto3	FTR Honda	FTR M312	27	(Italy) Niccolò Antonelli	2–17
(Spain) Wild Wolf BST	FTR Honda	FTR M312	28	(Spain) Josep Rodríguez	2
(Spain) Wild Wolf BST	FTR Honda	FTR M312	58	(Spain) Juan Francisco Guevara	13, 17
(Italy) Ongetta-Centro Seta (Italy) Redox-Ongetta-Centro Seta	FTR Honda	FTR M312	28	(Spain) Josep Rodríguez	12
(Italy) Ongetta-Centro Seta (Italy) Redox-Ongetta-Centro Seta	FTR Honda	FTR M312	32	(Spain) Isaac Viñales	1–11, 13–17
(Italy) Ongetta-Centro Seta (Italy) Redox-Ongetta-Centro Seta	FTR Honda	FTR M312	84	(Czech Republic) Jakub Kornfeil	All
(Czech Republic) Moto FGR	FGR Honda	FGR 250 GP	28	(Spain) Josep Rodríguez	14–17
(Czech Republic) Moto FGR	FGR Honda	FGR 250 GP	53	(Netherlands) Jasper Iwema	1–13
(Italy) Team Imperiali Racing	Honda	Honda NSF250R	33	(Italy) Stefano Valtulini	12
(Australia) Fastline GP Racing	Honda	Honda NSF250R	36	(Australia) Sam Clarke	16
(Netherlands) RW Racing GP	Kalex KTM	Kalex KTM	39	(Spain) Luis Salom	All
(Netherlands) RW Racing GP	Kalex KTM	Kalex KTM	41	(South Africa) Brad Binder	All
(Spain) MIR Racing	Honda	MIR Racing Moto3	40	(Spain) Julián Miralles	7
(Germany) Freudenberg Racing Team	Honda	Honda NSF250R	43	(Germany) Luca Grünwald	8, 11
(Spain) Bradol Larresport	Honda	Honda NSF250R	49	(Spain) Jorge Navarro	13
(France) Technomag-CIP-TSR	TSR Honda	TSR TSR3	51	(Japan) Kenta Fujii	All
(France) Technomag-CIP-TSR	TSR Honda	TSR TSR3	89	(France) Alan Techer	All
(Germany) HP Moto Kalex	Kalex KTM	Kalex KTM	65	(Germany) Philipp Öttl	17
(Italy) Racing Team Gabrielli	Honda	Honda NSF250R	71	(Italy) Michael Ruben Rinaldi	9
(Italy) Elle 2 Ciatti	Honda	Honda NSF250R	74	(Italy) Kevin Calia	9, 12
(Australia) K1 Racing	Honda	Honda NSF250R	75	(Australia) Lincoln Gilding	16
(Japan) Project μ 7C Harc	Honda	Honda NSF250R	81	(Japan) Hyuga Watanabe	14
(Japan) 18 Garage Racing Team	Honda	Honda NSF250R	82	(Japan) Yudai Kamei	14
(Germany) Thomas Sabo GP Team	Honda	Honda NSF250R	86	(Germany) Kevin Hanus	3–4, 8

Key
Regular Rider
Wildcard Rider
Replacement Rider

== Results and standings ==
=== Grands Prix ===
Round	Grand Prix	Pole position	Fastest lap	Winning rider	Winning team	Winning constructor	Report
1	Qatar motorcycle Grand Prix	(Germany) Sandro Cortese	(Spain) Maverick Viñales	(Spain) Maverick Viñales	(Spain) Blusens Avintia	(United Kingdom) FTR Honda	Report
2	(Spain) Spanish motorcycle Grand Prix	(Spain) Álex Rins	(Italy) Romano Fenati	(Italy) Romano Fenati	(Italy) Team Italia FMI	(United Kingdom) FTR Honda	Report
3	(Portugal) Portuguese motorcycle Grand Prix	(Germany) Sandro Cortese	(Germany) Sandro Cortese	(Germany) Sandro Cortese	(Finland) Red Bull KTM Ajo	(Austria) KTM	Report
4	(France) French motorcycle Grand Prix	(Spain) Maverick Viñales	(Czech Republic) Jakub Kornfeil	(France) Louis Rossi	Racing Team Germany	(United Kingdom) FTR Honda	Report
5	(Catalonia) Catalan motorcycle Grand Prix	(Spain) Maverick Viñales	(Spain) Álex Márquez	(Spain) Maverick Viñales	(Spain) Blusens Avintia	(United Kingdom) FTR Honda	Report
6	(United Kingdom) British motorcycle Grand Prix	(Spain) Maverick Viñales	(Germany) Sandro Cortese	(Spain) Maverick Viñales	(Spain) Blusens Avintia	(United Kingdom) FTR Honda	Report
7	(Netherlands) Dutch TT	(Germany) Sandro Cortese	(Malaysia) Zulfahmi Khairuddin	(Spain) Maverick Viñales	(Spain) Blusens Avintia	(United Kingdom) FTR Honda	Report
8	(Germany) German motorcycle Grand Prix	(Germany) Sandro Cortese	(Germany) Sandro Cortese	(Germany) Sandro Cortese	(Finland) Red Bull KTM Ajo	(Austria) KTM	Report
9	(Italy) Italian motorcycle Grand Prix	(Spain) Maverick Viñales	(Germany) Sandro Cortese	(Spain) Maverick Viñales	(Spain) Blusens Avintia	(United Kingdom) FTR Honda	Report
10	Indianapolis motorcycle Grand Prix	(Germany) Sandro Cortese	(Italy) Romano Fenati	(Spain) Luis Salom	(Netherlands) RW Racing GP	(Germany) Kalex KTM	Report
11	Czech Republic motorcycle Grand Prix	(Spain) Maverick Viñales	(Spain) Luis Salom	(Germany) Jonas Folger	(Spain) Maphre Aspar Team Moto3	(Germany) Kalex KTM	Report
12	San Marino and Rimini Riviera motorcycle Grand Prix	(Germany) Sandro Cortese	(Spain) Álex Rins	(Germany) Sandro Cortese	(Finland) Red Bull KTM Ajo	(Austria) KTM	Report
13	Aragon motorcycle Grand Prix	(Germany) Jonas Folger	(United Kingdom) Danny Kent	(Spain) Luis Salom	(Netherlands) RW Racing GP	(Germany) Kalex KTM	Report
14	(Japan) Japanese motorcycle Grand Prix	(United Kingdom) Danny Kent	(Italy) Alessandro Tonucci	(United Kingdom) Danny Kent	(Finland) Red Bull KTM Ajo	(Austria) KTM	Report
15	(Malaysia) Malaysian motorcycle Grand Prix	(Malaysia) Zulfahmi Khairuddin	(Malaysia) Zulfahmi Khairuddin	(Germany) Sandro Cortese	(Finland) Red Bull KTM Ajo	(Austria) KTM	Report
16	(Australia) Australian motorcycle Grand Prix	(Germany) Sandro Cortese	(Italy) Alessandro Tonucci	(Germany) Sandro Cortese	(Finland) Red Bull KTM Ajo	(Austria) KTM	Report
17	Valencian Community motorcycle Grand Prix	(Germany) Jonas Folger	(Malaysia) Zulfahmi Khairuddin	(United Kingdom) Danny Kent	(Finland) Red Bull KTM Ajo	(Austria) KTM	Report

=== Riders' standings ===
Scoring system

Points were awarded to the top fifteen finishers. A rider had to finish the race to earn points.

Position	**1st**	**2nd**	**3rd**	**4th**	**5th**	**6th**	**7th**	**8th**	**9th**	**10th**	**11th**	**12th**	**13th**	**14th**	**15th**
Points	25	20	16	13	11	10	9	8	7	6	5	4	3	2	1

Pos	Rider	Bike	QAT (Qatar)	SPA (Spain)	POR (Portugal)	FRA (France)	CAT (Catalonia)	GBR (United Kingdom)	NED (Netherlands)	GER (Germany)	ITA (Italy)	INP (Indianapolis)	CZE (Czech Republic)	RSM (San Marino)	ARA (Aragon)	JPN (Japan)	MAL (Malaysia)	AUS (Australia)	VAL (Valencian Community)	Pts
1	(Germany) Sandro Cortese	KTM	**3**	3	**1**	6	2	3	**2**	**1**	3	**2**	3	**1**	2	6	1	**1**	2	325
2	(Spain) Luis Salom	Kalex KTM	4	2	3	Ret	10	2	4	3	Ret	1	2	2	1	Ret	4	15	10	214
3	(Spain) Maverick Viñales	FTR Honda	1	6	2	**Ret**	**1**	**1**	1	17	**1**	Ret	**4**	5	DNS	2	WD	Ret	8	207
4	(United Kingdom) Danny Kent	KTM	8	Ret	8	Ret	20	6	3	Ret	5	12	7	12	4	**1**	6	5	1	154
5	(Spain) Álex Rins	Suter Honda	10	**4**	7	3	Ret	Ret	6	20	7	7	5	4	6	4	7	4	16	141
6	(Italy) Romano Fenati	FTR Honda	2	1	Ret	Ret	9	7	12	24	2	5	8	3	Ret	10	20	6	18	136
7	(Malaysia) Zulfahmi Khairuddin	KTM	6	10	4	Ret	8	9	11	6	9	6	Ret	11	Ret	5	**2**	Ret	3	128
8	(Portugal) Miguel Oliveira	Suter Honda	5	Ret	Ret	Ret	3	10	10	19	Ret	4	9	9	8	7	5	2	Ret	114
9	(Germany) Jonas Folger	Ioda	Ret	WD		11	Ret	Ret	Ret	Ret	Ret									93
9	(Germany) Jonas Folger	Kalex KTM										3	1	6	**3**	Ret	3	11	**Ret**	93
10	(Spain) Efrén Vázquez	Honda	16																	93
10	(Spain) Efrén Vázquez	FTR Honda		Ret	5	Ret	Ret	5	9	5	6	Ret	25	7	5	9	8	8	Ret	93
11	(France) Louis Rossi	FTR Honda	9	Ret	Ret	1	4	Ret	5	Ret	Ret	13	17	Ret	7	8	Ret	20	6	86
12	(Australia) Arthur Sissis	KTM	7	Ret	13	5	22	8	16	9	Ret	11	14	10	9	11	11	3	19	84
13	(France) Alexis Masbou	Honda	Ret	5	9	Ret	5	4	7	2	12	10	16							81
14	(Italy) Niccolò Antonelli	Honda	17																	77
14	(Italy) Niccolò Antonelli	FTR Honda		8	6	4	12	13	Ret	12	4	Ret	23	8	10	12	15	DNS	13	77
15	(Czech Republic) Jakub Kornfeil	FTR Honda	15	Ret	10	Ret	11	11	13	10	8	8	6	15	11	15	16	13	7	71
16	(Spain) Héctor Faubel	Kalex KTM	12	9	12	Ret	7	12	15	7	10	DNS	11	13						63
16	(Spain) Héctor Faubel	FTR Honda																	5	63
17	(Spain) Alberto Moncayo	Kalex KTM	14	7	14	2	14	15	19	Ret	Ret									52
17	(Spain) Alberto Moncayo	FTR Honda										9	12	14	13	Ret	18	17		52
18	(Italy) Alessandro Tonucci	FTR Honda	Ret	11	18	14	28	16	22	16	16	15	10	17	12	3	17	7	14	45
19	(Finland) Niklas Ajo	KTM	13	Ret	EX	15	21	14	8	14	11	DSQ	EX	Ret	14	13	9	Ret	9	40
20	(Spain) Álex Márquez	Suter Honda		12	15		6					Ret	21	Ret	15	14	14	9	Ret	27
21	(South Africa) Brad Binder	Kalex KTM	Ret	Ret	11	Ret	Ret	17	20	Ret	24	Ret	20	16	16	Ret	12	14	4	24
22	(France) Alan Techer	TSR Honda	11	14	17	8	13	21	17	13	17	Ret	DNS	Ret	21	20	21	16	21	21
23	(Australia) Jack Miller	Honda	25	Ret		Ret	15	Ret	DSQ	4	21	DNS		Ret	19	19	13	21	Ret	17
24	(Spain) Adrián Martín	Honda	20																	16
24	(Spain) Adrián Martín	FTR Honda		Ret	Ret	Ret	17	Ret	18	Ret	13	Ret	13	DNS	Ret	17	10	12	Ret	16
25	(Spain) Iván Moreno	FTR Honda	19	13	20	9	18	22	29	25	26									10
26	(Netherlands) Jasper Iwema	FGR Honda	24	17	Ret	7	16	18	24	Ret	Ret	Ret	24	Ret	Ret					9
27	(Germany) Luca Grünwald	Honda								8			19							8
28	(Spain) Isaac Viñales	FTR Honda	Ret	Ret	Ret	Ret	24	23	21	21	19	14	DNS		17	23	19	10	20	8
29	(Switzerland) Giulian Pedone	Oral		15	NC															7
29	(Switzerland) Giulian Pedone	Suter Honda				10	27	27	Ret	27	23	17	22	Ret	23	25	26	23	17	7
30	(Germany) Toni Finsterbusch	MZ-RE Honda	23																	7
30	(Germany) Toni Finsterbusch	MZ FTR		Ret																7
30	(Germany) Toni Finsterbusch	Honda			21	DNS		19	14	11	18	16	Ret	18	18	Ret	23	Ret	Ret	7
31	(Germany) Philipp Öttl	Kalex KTM																	11	5
32	(Spain) Juan Francisco Guevara	FTR Honda													24				12	4
33	(Germany) Marcel Schrötter	Mahindra	Ret	16	19	12	Ret	26	Ret	Ret										4
34	(Germany) Kevin Hanus	Honda			25	13				26										3
35	(Italy) Kevin Calia	Honda									14			Ret						2
36	(Spain) Josep Rodríguez	FTR Honda		Ret										23						1
36	(Spain) Josep Rodríguez	FGR Honda														24	25	DNS	15	1
37	(United Kingdom) John McPhee	KRP Honda					19	28					15		22	21	22	19	Ret	1
38	(Italy) Michael Ruben Rinaldi	Honda									15		Ret	20						1
39	(Italy) Simone Grotzkyj	Oral	22	Ret	WD															1
39	(Italy) Simone Grotzkyj	Suter Honda				Ret	23	20	23	15	22									1
	(Japan) Hyuga Watanabe	Honda														16				0
	(Spain) Joan Olivé	KTM			16								18							0
	(Japan) Kenta Fujii	TSR Honda	21	Ret	23	Ret	25	24	27	23	25	18	26	22	26	18	27	22	23	0
	(United Kingdom) Danny Webb	Mahindra	18	Ret	Ret	Ret	Ret	Ret	Ret	18	20	DNS		Ret	25	26	Ret	DNS	Ret	0
	(Italy) Armando Pontone	Ioda			NC							19	28	Ret	27	DNS	28	18	24	0
	(Czech Republic) Miroslav Popov	Mahindra											Ret	19	Ret				Ret	0
	(Germany) Luca Amato	Kalex KTM													20	22	24	Ret	22	0
	(Italy) Riccardo Moretti	Mahindra									Ret	20	DNS			DNS	Ret	Ret		0
	(Italy) Luigi Morciano	Ioda	Ret	Ret	24	Ret	26	25	28	22	27	Ret	27	21	DNS				Ret	0
	(Italy) Manuel Tatasciore	Honda			22															0
	(Australia) Lincoln Gilding	Honda																24		0
	(Italy) Stefano Valtulini	Honda												24						0
	(Australia) Sam Clarke	Honda																25		0
	(Netherlands) Bryan Schouten	Honda							25											0
	(Spain) Julián Miralles	Honda							26											0
	(Japan) Yudai Kamei	Honda														27				0
	(Spain) Jorge Navarro	Honda													Ret					0
	(United Kingdom) Fraser Rogers	KRP Honda						Ret												0
Pos	Rider	Bike	QAT (Qatar)	SPA (Spain)	POR (Portugal)	FRA (France)	CAT (Catalonia)	GBR (United Kingdom)	NED (Netherlands)	GER (Germany)	ITA (Italy)	INP (Indianapolis)	CZE (Czech Republic)	RSM (San Marino)	ARA (Aragon)	JPN (Japan)	MAL (Malaysia)	AUS (Australia)	VAL (Valencian Community)	Pts

Colour	Result
Gold	Winner
Silver	Second place
Bronze	Third place
Green	Points classification
Blue	Non-points classification
Blue	Non-classified finish (NC)
Purple	Retired, not classified (Ret)
Red	Did not qualify (DNQ)
Red	Did not pre-qualify (DNPQ)
Black	Disqualified (DSQ)
White	Did not start (DNS)
White	Withdrew (WD)
White	Race cancelled (C)
Blank	Did not practice (DNP)
Blank	Did not arrive (DNA)
Blank	Excluded (EX)

**Bold** – Pole
Italics – Fastest Lap
Light blue – Rookie

=== Constructors' standings ===
Each constructor received the same number of points as their best placed rider in each race.

Pos	Constructor	QAT (Qatar)	SPA (Spain)	POR (Portugal)	FRA (France)	CAT (Catalonia)	GBR (United Kingdom)	NED (Netherlands)	GER (Germany)	ITA (Italy)	INP (Indianapolis)	CZE (Czech Republic)	RSM (San Marino)	ARA (Aragon)	JPN (Japan)	MAL (Malaysia)	AUS (Australia)	VAL (Valencian Community)	Pts
1	(Austria) KTM	3	3	1	5	2	3	2	1	3	2	3	1	2	1	1	1	1	346
2	(United Kingdom) FTR Honda	1	1	2	1	1	1	1	5	1	5	4	3	5	2	8	6	5	306
3	(Germany) Kalex KTM	4	2	3	2	7	2	4	3	10	1	1	2	1	22	3	11	4	262
4	(Switzerland) Suter Honda	5	4	7	3	3	10	6	15	7	4	5	4	6	4	5	2	16	182
5	(Japan) Honda	16	5	9	13	5	4	7	2	12	10	16	18	18	16	13	21	Ret	87
6	(Japan) TSR Honda	11	14	17	8	13	21	17	13	17	18	26	22	21	18	21	16	21	21
7	(Czech Republic) FGR Honda	24	17	Ret	7	16	18	24	Ret	Ret	Ret	24	Ret	Ret	24	25	DNS	15	10
8	(Italy) Ioda	Ret	Ret	24	11	26	25	28	22	27	19	27	21	27	Ret	28	18	24	5
9	(India) Mahindra	18	16	19	12	Ret	26	Ret	18	20	20	Ret	19	25	26	Ret	Ret	Ret	4
10	(United Kingdom) KRP Honda					19	28					15		22	21	22	19	Ret	1
11	(Italy) Oral	22	15	NC															1
	(Germany) MZ-RE Honda	23																	0
	(Germany) MZ FTR		Ret																0
Pos	Constructor	QAT (Qatar)	SPA (Spain)	POR (Portugal)	FRA (France)	CAT (Catalonia)	GBR (United Kingdom)	NED (Netherlands)	GER (Germany)	ITA (Italy)	INP (Indianapolis)	CZE (Czech Republic)	RSM (San Marino)	ARA (Aragon)	JPN (Japan)	MAL (Malaysia)	AUS (Australia)	VAL (Valencian Community)	Pts
