= Sam Clarke (motorcyclist) =

Australian motorcycle racer

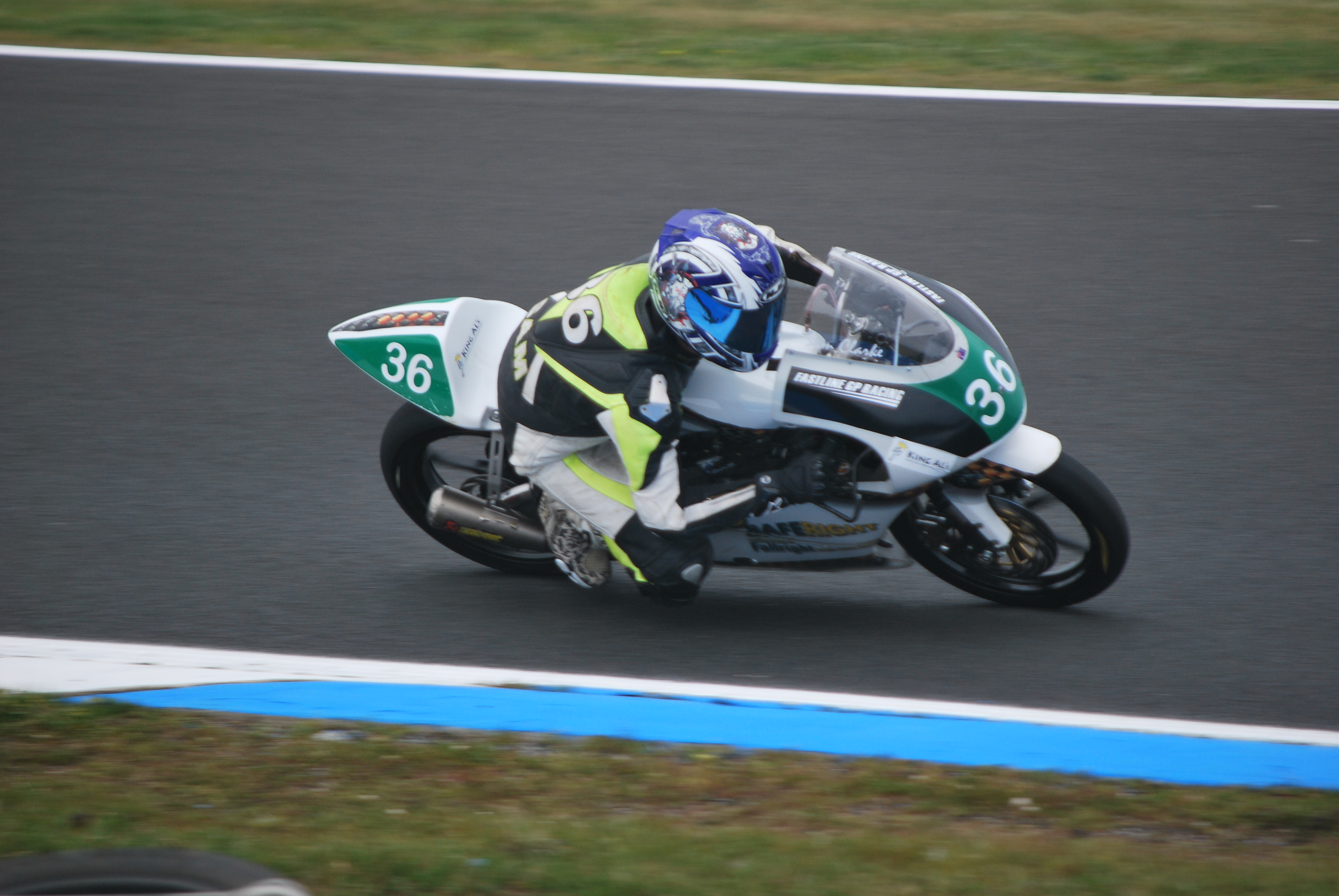
- Clarke at the 2012 Australian Grand Prix
- Nationality: Australian
- Born: 6 March 1996 (age 30); Gloucester, England, United Kingdom
Motorcycle racing career statistics
Moto3 World Championship
Active years	2012
Manufacturers	Honda
2012 championship position	NC (0 pts)
Starts / Wins / Podiums / Poles / F. laps / Points; 1 / 0 / 0 / 0 / 0 / 0

Sam Clarke (born 6 March 1996) is an Australian motorcycle racer. Known for his fast and smooth racing style and dominance in Western Australian motorcycle racing scene. He is the current Western Australian Superbike Champion.

== Career statistics ==
=== Grand Prix motorcycle racing ===
==== By season ====
Season	Class	Motorcycle	Team	Race	Win 42	Podium24	Pole14	FLap	Pts	Plcd
2012	Moto3	Honda	Fastline GP Racing	1	0	0	0	0	0	NC
Total				1	0	0	0	0	0	

==== Races by year ====
(key)

Year	Class	Bike	1	2	3	4	5	6	7	8	9	10	11	12	13	14	15	16	17	Pos.	Pts
2012	Moto3	Honda	QAT	SPA	POR	FRA	CAT	GBR	NED	GER	ITA	INP	CZE	RSM	ARA	JPN	MAL	AUS; 25	VAL	NC	0
