= Yudai Kamei =

Japanese motorcycle racer

- Nationality: Japanese
- Born: 16 April 1996 (age 30)
- Current team: RT Japan M Auto
- Bike number: 11
Motorcycle racing career statistics
Moto3 World Championship
Active years	2012
Manufacturers	Honda
2012 championship position	NC (0 pts)
Starts / Wins / Podiums / Poles / F. laps / Points; 1 / 0 / 0 / 0 / 0 / 0

Yudai Kamei (Japanese: 亀井 雄大, Hepburn: Kamei Yūdai; born 16 April 1996) is a Japanese motorcycle racer. He competes in the ST1000 class of the All Japan Road Race Championship for RT Japan M Auto, aboard a CBR1000RR-R.

== Career statistics ==
=== Grand Prix motorcycle racing ===
==== By season ====
Season	Class	Motorcycle	Team	Race	Win	Podium	Pole	FLap	Pts	Plcd
2012	Moto3	Honda	18 Garage Racing Team	1	0	0	0	0	0	NC
Total				**1**	**0**	**0**	**0**	**0**	**0**	

==== Races by year ====
(key)

Year	Class	Bike	1	2	3	4	5	6	7	8	9	10	11	12	13	14	15	16	17	Pos.	Pts
2012	Moto3	Honda	QAT	SPA	POR	FRA	CAT	GBR	NED	GER	ITA	INP	CZE	RSM	ARA	JPN; 27	MAL	AUS	VAL	NC	0

=== All Japan Road Race Championship ===
==== Races by year ====
(key) (Races in bold indicate pole position; races in italics indicate fastest lap)

Year	Class	Bike	1	2	3	4	5	6	7	8	9	10	11	Pos	Pts
2024	JSB1000	Honda	SUZ; 12	MOT1	MOT2	SUG1	SUG2	MOT	AUT1	AUT2	OKA	SUZ1; 15	SUZ2; 9	18th	18
2025	ST1000	Honda	SUG; 1	**MOT1**; 3	**MOT2**; 4	AUT; 3	**OKA**; 3	SUZ; 18						2nd	78
2026	ST1000	Honda	SUG; 19†	AUT; 6	**MOT1**; Ret	**MOT2**; 12	OKA; 7	SUZ; 8						10th	34

- † – Rider did not finish the race, but was classified as he completed more than 75% of the race distance.

=== Suzuka 8 Hours ===
Year	Class	Team	Co-riders	Bike	Pos
2026	**SST**	(Japan) NCXX Racing with Riders Club	(Japan) Tetsuta Nagashima (Japan) Yuta Date	Honda CBR1000RR-R	**1st**
