= Riccardo Moretti =

Italian motorcycle racer

- Nationality: Italian
- Born: 18 January 1985 (age 41); Lugo, Italy
Motorcycle racing career statistics
Moto3 World Championship
Active years	2012
Manufacturers	Mahindra
Championships	0
2012 championship position	NC (0 pts)
Starts / Wins / Podiums / Poles / F. laps / Points; 4 / 0 / 0 / 0 / 0 / 0
125cc World Championship
Active years	2008–2010
Manufacturers	Honda, Aprilia
Championships	0
2010 championship position	NC (0 pts)
Starts / Wins / Podiums / Poles / F. laps / Points; 7 / 0 / 0 / 0 / 0 / 3

Riccardo Moretti (born 18 January 1985) is an Italian motorcycle racer. He won the Italian Honda RS125GP Trophy in 2007 and the Italian CIV 125 championship in 2009.

== Career statistics ==
=== CIV Championship (Campionato Italiano Velocita) ===
==== Races by year ====
(key) (Races in bold indicate pole position; races in italics indicate fastest lap)

Year	Class	Bike	1	2	3	4	5	Pos	Pts
2003	125cc	Honda	MIS1	MUG1	MIS1	MUG2; 11	VAL	25th	5
2004	125cc	Honda	MUG; 10	IMO; 8	VAL1; Ret	MIS; Ret	VAL2; Ret	17th	14

=== Grand Prix motorcycle racing ===
==== By season ====
Season	Class	Motorcycle	Team	Number	Race	Win	Podium	Pole	FLap	Pts	Plcd
2008	125cc	Honda	CRP Racing	47	2	0	0	0	0	0	NC
2009	125cc	Aprilia	Ellegi Racing	51	2	0	0	0	0	3	27th
2010	125cc	Aprilia	Fontana Racing	51	3	0	0	0	0	0	NC
2010	125cc	Aprilia	Junior GP FMI	51	3	0	0	0	0	0	NC
2012	Moto3	Mahindra	Mahindra Racing	20	4	0	0	0	0	0	NC
Total					**11**	**0**	**0**	**0**	**0**	**3**	

==== Races by year ====
(key) (Races in bold indicate pole position, races in italics indicate fastest lap)

Year	Class	Bike	1	2	3	4	5	6	7	8	9	10	11	12	13	14	15	16	17	Pos	Pts
2008	125cc	Honda	QAT	SPA	POR	CHN	FRA	ITA; 26	CAT	GBR	NED	GER	CZE	RSM; Ret	INP	JPN	AUS	MAL	VAL	NC	0
2009	125cc	Aprilia	QAT	JPN	SPA	FRA	ITA; 20	CAT	NED	GER	GBR	CZE	INP	RSM; 13	POR	AUS	MAL	VAL		27th	3
2010	125cc	Aprilia	QAT	SPA; Ret	FRA; Ret	ITA; 16	GBR	NED	CAT	GER	CZE	INP	RSM	ARA	JPN	MAL	AUS	POR	VAL	NC	0
2012	Moto3	Mahindra	QAT	SPA	POR	FRA	CAT	GBR	NED	GER	ITA; Ret	INP; 20	CZE; DNS	RSM	ARA	JPN; DNS	MAL; Ret	AUS; Ret	VAL	NC	0

Sporting positions
Preceded by Lorenzo Savadori	Italian 125GP champion 2009	Succeeded by Francesco Mauriello
