= Alberto Moncayo =

Spanish motorcycle racer

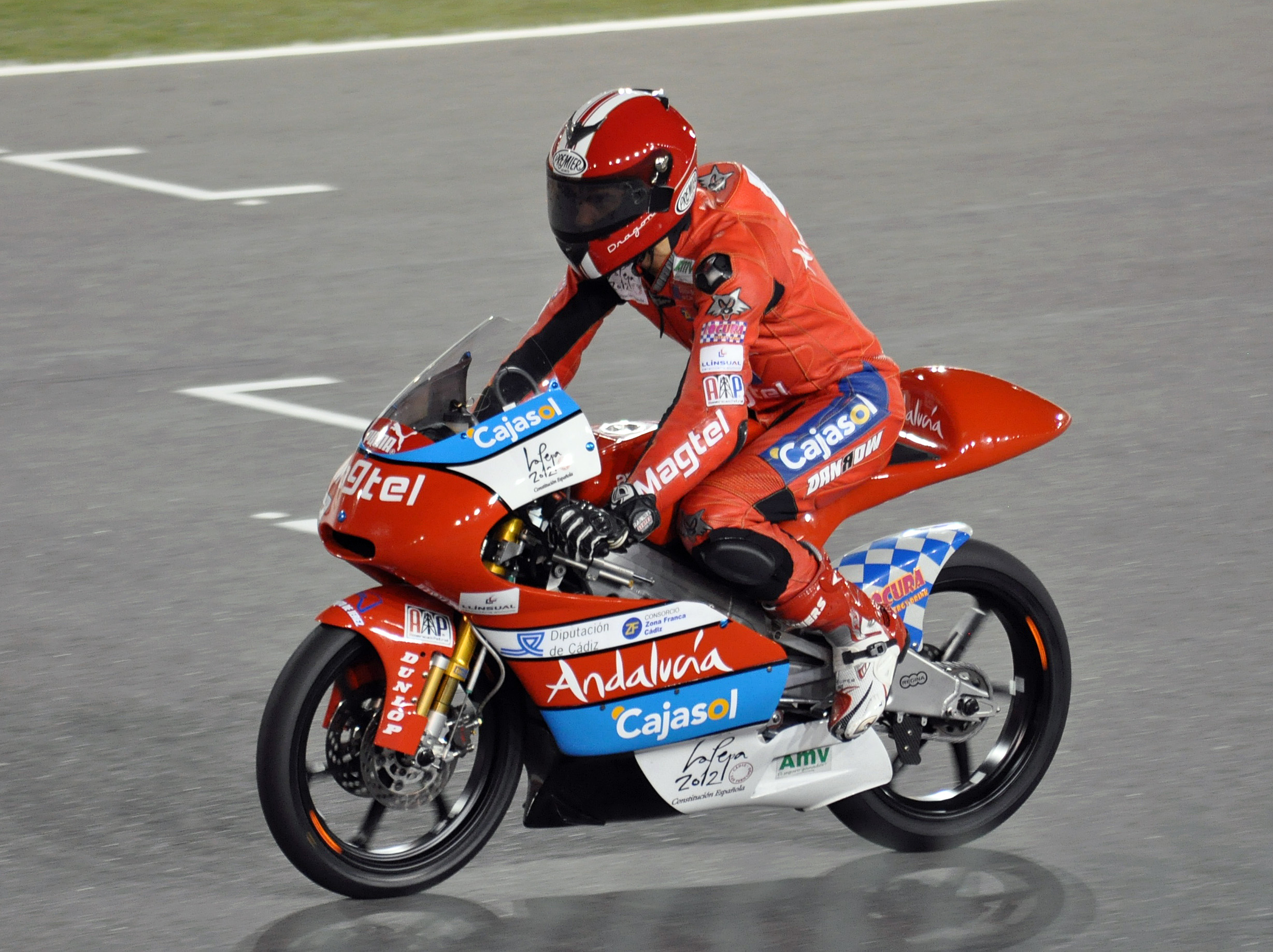
- Moncayo at the 2010 Qatar Grand Prix
- Nationality: Spanish
- Born: 23 July 1991 (age 35); Cádiz, Spain
Motorcycle racing career statistics
Moto2 World Championship
Active years	2013–
Manufacturers	Speed Up
2013 championship position	NC (0 pts)
Starts / Wins / Podiums / Poles / F. laps / Points; 13 / 0 / 0 / 0 / 0 / 0
Moto3 World Championship
Active years	2012
Manufacturers	Kalex KTM, FTR Honda
Championships	0
2012 championship position	17th (52 pts)
Starts / Wins / Podiums / Poles / F. laps / Points; 16 / 0 / 1 / 0 / 0 / 52
125cc World Championship
Active years	2008–2011
Manufacturers	Derbi, Aprilia
Championships	0
2011 championship position	10th (94 pts)
Starts / Wins / Podiums / Poles / F. laps / Points; 38 / 0 / 1 / 0 / 0 / 164

Alberto Moncayo Bernal (born 23 July 1991) is a Grand Prix motorcycle racer from Spain.

== Career ==
=== Early career ===
Born in Cádiz, Moncayo began competitive racing at a young age and won his first championship at the age of eleven, winning the Valencian minimoto championship before winning the championship of Andalucia the following season. Moncayo then moved up to 125cc level in 2005, competing in the Catalan championship, where he would finish 11th in the 2005 championship and improved to finish runner-up in 2006. He moved up to the CEV Buckler 125GP series in 2007 where he would compete for three full seasons, ending up with the championship in 2009 with three victories at Valencia, Albacete and Catalunya.

=== 125cc World Championship ===
Moncayo made his début in the 125cc World Championship in 2008, making a wildcard appearance at the Spanish Grand Prix, finishing 25th in the race. He made appearances in the three Spanish races and the Portuguese Grand Prix in 2009, but finished outside of the points in all four races.

Moncayo moved into the 125cc World Championship full-time ahead of the 2010 season, partnering Danny Webb at the Andalucia Cajasol team. A fifth place, and three further top ten finishes helped Moncayo to finish in 13th place in the final championship standings.

== Career statistics ==
=== By season ===
Season	Class	Motorcycle	Team	Number	Race	Win	Podium	Pole	FLap	Pts	Plcd
2008	125cc	Derbi	Andalucia Derbi	79	1	0	0	0	0	0	NC
2009	125cc	Aprilia	Andalucia Aprilia	42	4	0	0	0	0	0	NC
2010	125cc	Aprilia	Andalucia Cajasol	23	17	0	0	0	0	70	13th
2011	125cc	Aprilia	Andalucia Banca Civica	23	16	0	1	0	0	94	10th
2012	Moto3	Kalex KTM	Bankia Aspar Team	23	16	0	1	0	0	52	17th
2012	Moto3	FTR Honda	Andalucia JHK Laglisse	23	16	0	1	0	0	52	17th
2013	Moto2	Speed Up	Argiñano & Gines Racing	17	13	0	0	0	0	0	NC
Total					67	0	2	0	0	216	

=== By class ===
Class	Seasons	1st GP	1st Pod	1st Win	Race	Win	Podiums	Pole	FLap	Pts	WChmp
125 cc	2008–2011	2008 Spain	2011 Czech Republic		38	0	1	0	0	164	0
Moto3	2012	2012 Qatar	2012 France		16	0	1	0	0	52	0
Moto2	2013–	2013 Qatar			13	0	0	0	0	0	0

=== Races by year ===
(key)

Yr	Class	Bike	1	2	3	4	5	6	7	8	9	10	11	12	13	14	15	16	17	Pos	Pts
2008	125cc	Derbi	QAT	SPA; 25	POR	CHN	FRA	ITA	CAT	GBR	NED	GER	CZE	RSM	INP	JPN	AUS	MAL	VAL	NC	0
2009	125cc	Aprilia	QAT	JPN	SPA; 22	FRA	ITA	CAT; 19	NED	GER	GBR	CZE	INP	RSM	POR; 18	AUS	MAL	VAL; 19		NC	0
2010	125cc	Aprilia	QAT; 13	SPA; 6	FRA; 17	ITA; Ret	GBR; 12	NED; 11	CAT; 13	GER; Ret	CZE; 12	INP; 8	RSM; 13	ARA; 17	JPN; 5	MAL; 12	AUS; Ret	POR; 6	VAL; 11	13th	70
2011	125cc	Aprilia	QAT; 7	SPA; 16	POR; Ret	FRA; 11	CAT; 15	GBR; 17	NED; 15	ITA; 9	GER; 11	CZE; 3	INP; DNS	RSM; 11	ARA; 8	JPN; 7	AUS; 5	MAL; 9	VAL; 6	10th	94
2012	Moto3	Kalex KTM	QAT; 14	SPA; 7	POR; 14	FRA; 2	CAT; 14	GBR; 15	NED; 19	GER; Ret	ITA; Ret									17th	52
2012	Moto3	FTR Honda										INP; 9	CZE; 12	RSM; 14	ARA; 13	JPN; Ret	MAL; 18	AUS; 17	VAL	17th	52
2013	Moto2	Speed Up	QAT; 25	AME; Ret	SPA; 23	FRA; 16	ITA; 22	CAT; 21	NED; 23	GER	INP; 26	CZE; Ret	GBR; Ret	RSM; Ret	ARA; 21	MAL	AUS	JPN	VAL; 28	NC	0

Sporting positions
Preceded by Efrén Vázquez	CEV Buckler 125GP champion 2009	Succeeded by Maverick Viñales
