= Giulian Pedone =

Swiss motorcycle racer (born 1993)

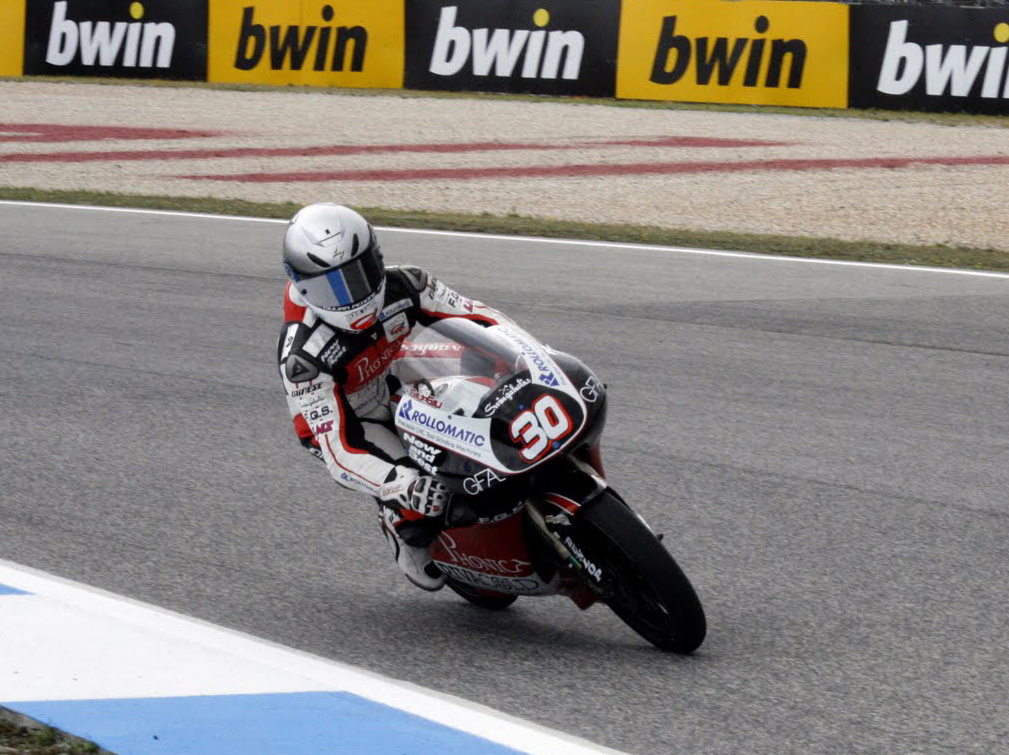
- Pedone at the 2011 Portuguese Grand Prix
- Nationality: Swiss
- Born: 29 November 1993 (age 32); Neuchâtel, Switzerland
Motorcycle racing career statistics
Moto3 World Championship
Active years	2012
Manufacturers	Oral, Suter Honda
Championships	0
2012 championship position	29th (7 pts)
Starts / Wins / Podiums / Poles / F. laps / Points; 16 / 0 / 0 / 0 / 0 / 7
125cc World Championship
Active years	2011
Manufacturers	Aprilia
Championships	0
2011 championship position	33rd (1 pt)
Starts / Wins / Podiums / Poles / F. laps / Points; 17 / 0 / 0 / 0 / 0 / 1

Giulian Pedone (born 29 November 1993 in Neuchâtel) is a Swiss motorcycle racer.

== Career statistics ==
=== Grand Prix motorcycle racing ===
==== By season ====
Season	Class	Motorcycle	Team	Number	Race	Win	Podium	Pole	FLap	Pts	Plcd
2011	125cc	Aprilia	Phonica Racing	30	17	0	0	0	0	1	33rd
2012	Moto3	Oral	Ambrogio Next Racing	30	16	0	0	0	0	7	29th
2012	Moto3	Suter Honda	Ambrogio Next Racing	30	16	0	0	0	0	7	29th
Total					33	0	0	0	0	8	

==== Races by year ====
(key)

Year	Class	Bike	1	2	3	4	5	6	7	8	9	10	11	12	13	14	15	16	17	Pos.	Pts
2011	125cc	Aprilia	QAT; 26	SPA; Ret	POR; 19	FRA; 23	CAT; 21	GBR; Ret	NED; 19	ITA; 23	GER; 20	CZE; 24	INP; 24	RSM; 23	ARA; 18	JPN; 19	AUS; 25	MAL; 17	VAL; 15	33rd	1
2012	Moto3	Oral	QAT	SPA; 15	POR; NC															29th	7
2012	Moto3	Suter Honda				FRA; 10	CAT; 27	GBR; 27	NED; Ret	GER; 27	ITA; 23	INP; 17	CZE; 22	RSM; Ret	ARA; 23	JPN; 25	MAL; 26	AUS; 23	VAL; 17	29th	7
