= Alessandro Tonucci =

Italian motorcycle racer

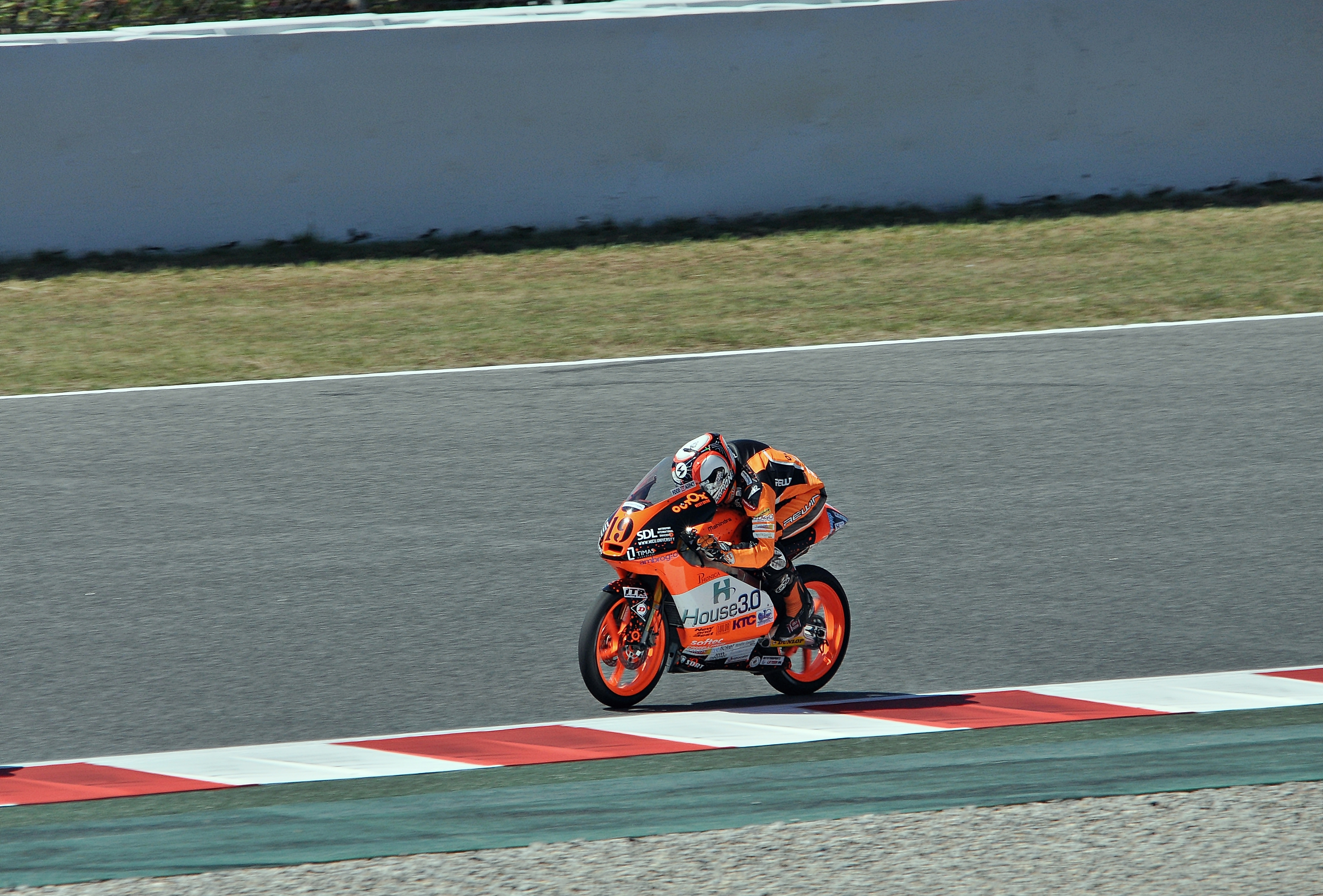
- Tonucci at the 2015 Catalan Grand Prix.
- Nationality: Italian
- Born: 23 April 1993 (age 33); Fano, Italy
- Current team: Team Green Speed
- Bike number: 19
Motorcycle racing career statistics
Moto2 World Championship
Active years	2016
Manufacturers	Kalex
Championships	0
2016 championship position	NC (0 points)
Starts / Wins / Podiums / Poles / F. laps / Points; 6 / 0 / 0 / 0 / 0 / 0
Moto3 World Championship
Active years	2012–2015
Manufacturers	FTR Honda, Honda, Mahindra
Championships	0
2015 championship position	NC (0 pts)
Starts / Wins / Podiums / Poles / F. laps / Points; 65 / 0 / 1 / 0 / 2 / 71
125cc World Championship
Active years	2009–2011
Manufacturers	Aprilia
Championships	0
2011 championship position	25th (12 pts)
Starts / Wins / Podiums / Poles / F. laps / Points; 23 / 0 / 0 / 0 / 0 / 15

Alessandro Tonucci (born 23 April 1993) is a Grand Prix motorcycle racer from Italy. He currently rides a Kawasaki ZX-6R in the CIV Supersport Championship. He is a former runner-up of the Italian 125GP Championship, doing so in 2009.

== Career statistics ==
=== By season ===
Season	Class	Motorcycle	Team	Race	Win	Podium	Pole	FLap	Pts	Plcd
2009	125cc	Aprilia	Junior GP Racing Dream	3	0	0	0	0	0	NC
2010	125cc	Aprilia	Junior GP Racing Team FMI	4	0	0	0	0	3	26th
2011	125cc	Aprilia	Team Italia FMI	16	0	0	0	0	12	25th
2012	Moto3	FTR Honda	Team Italia FMI	17	0	1	0	2	45	18th
2013	Moto3	Honda	La Fonte Tascaracing	13	0	0	0	0	6	26th
2013	Moto3	FTR Honda	La Fonte Tascaracing	13	0	0	0	0	6	26th
2014	Moto3	Mahindra	CIP	18	0	0	0	0	20	19th
2015	Moto3	Mahindra	Outox Reset Drink Team	17	0	0	0	0	0	NC
2016	Moto2	Kalex	Tasca Racing Scuderia	6	0	0	0	0	0	NC
Total				94	0	1	0	2	86	

=== Races by year ===
(key)

Year	Class	Bike	1	2	3	4	5	6	7	8	9	10	11	12	13	14	15	16	17	18	Pos	Pts
2009	125cc	Aprilia	QAT	JPN	SPA	FRA	ITA; 26	CAT	NED	GER	GBR	CZE; 23	INP	RSM; 29	POR	AUS	MAL	VAL			NC	0
2010	125cc	Aprilia	QAT	SPA	FRA	ITA; 18	GBR	NED	CAT	GER	CZE; 18	INP	RSM; 20	ARA	JPN	MAL	AUS	POR; 13	VAL		26th	3
2011	125cc	Aprilia	QAT; 22	SPA; 19	POR; DNS	FRA; 26	CAT; 29	GBR; 20	NED; 23	ITA; 20	GER; 25	CZE; 19	INP; 23	RSM; 17	ARA; 14	JPN; 10	AUS; 16	MAL; 15	VAL; 13		25th	12
2012	Moto3	FTR Honda	QAT; Ret	SPA; 11	POR; 18	FRA; 14	CAT; 28	GBR; 16	NED; 22	GER; 16	ITA; 16	INP; 15	CZE; 10	RSM; 17	ARA; 12	JPN; 3	MAL; 17	AUS; 7	VAL; 14		18th	45
2013	Moto3	Honda	QAT; 18	AME; 18	SPA; 18																26th	6
2013	Moto3	FTR Honda				FRA; 14	ITA; Ret	CAT; 16	NED; 25	GER; 26	INP; Ret	CZE; 12	GBR; Ret	RSM; 16	ARA; 27	MAL; DNS	AUS	JPN	VAL		26th	6
2014	Moto3	Mahindra	QAT; 21	AME; 16	ARG; 13	SPA; 18	FRA; Ret	ITA; 7	CAT; 13	NED; 26	GER; 16	INP; Ret	CZE; 21	GBR; 22	RSM; 18	ARA; Ret	JPN; 15	AUS; 14	MAL; 14	VAL; 21	19th	20
2015	Moto3	Mahindra	QAT; 25	AME; 21	ARG; 25	SPA; Ret	FRA; Ret	ITA; 19	CAT; 17	NED; 21	GER; 24	INP; 16	CZE; 25	GBR; Ret	RSM; 22	ARA; 23	JPN; Ret	AUS; 16	MAL; DNS	VAL; Ret	NC	0
2016	Moto2	Kalex	QAT; 21	ARG; 27	AME; 24	SPA; 19	FRA; 22	ITA; 25	CAT	NED	GER	AUT	CZE	GBR	RSM	ARA	JPN	AUS	MAL	VAL	NC	0
