= 2012 Japanese motorcycle Grand Prix =

(Japan) 2012 Japanese Grand Prix
Race details
- Race 15 of 18 races in the 2012 Grand Prix motorcycle racing season
- Date: 14 October 2012
- Official name: AirAsia Grand Prix of Japan
- Location: Twin Ring Motegi
- Course: Permanent racing facility; 4.801 km (2.983 mi)

MotoGP
Pole position
Rider	(Spain) Jorge Lorenzo	Yamaha
Time	1:44.969	
Fastest lap
Rider	(Spain) Dani Pedrosa	Honda
Time	1:45.589	
Podium
First	(Spain) Dani Pedrosa	Honda
Second	(Spain) Jorge Lorenzo	Yamaha
Third	(Spain) Álvaro Bautista	Honda

Moto2
Pole position
Rider	(Spain) Pol Espargaró	Kalex
Time	1:50.886	
Fastest lap
Rider	(Spain) Pol Espargaró	Kalex
Time	1:51.100	
Podium
First	(Spain) Marc Márquez	Suter
Second	(Spain) Pol Espargaró	Kalex
Third	(Spain) Esteve Rabat	Kalex

Moto3
Pole position
Rider	(United Kingdom) Danny Kent	KTM
Time	1:58.371	
Fastest lap
Rider	(Italy) Alessandro Tonucci	FTR Honda
Time	1:59.111	
Podium
First	(United Kingdom) Danny Kent	KTM
Second	(Spain) Maverick Viñales	FTR Honda
Third	(Italy) Alessandro Tonucci	FTR Honda

The 2012 Japanese motorcycle Grand Prix was the fifteenth round of the 2012 Grand Prix motorcycle racing season. It took place on the weekend of 12–14 October 2012 at the Twin Ring Motegi, located in Motegi, Japan.

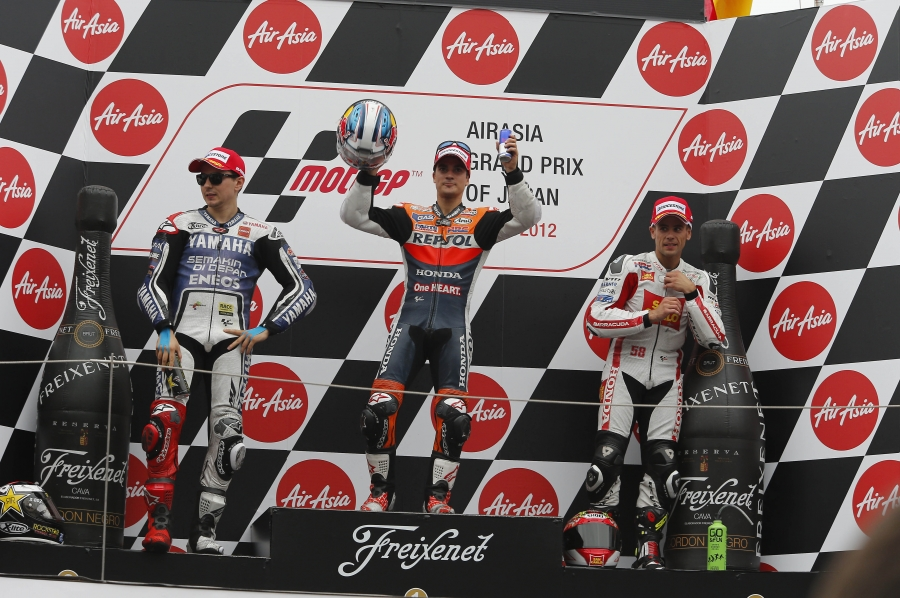
Jorge Lorenzo, Dani Pedrosa and Álvaro Bautista, celebrating on the podium after finishing second, first and third at the MotoGP race.

== Classification ==
=== MotoGP ===
Pos.	No.	Rider	Team	Manufacturer	Laps	Time/Retired	Grid	Points
1	26	(Spain) Dani Pedrosa	Repsol Honda Team	Honda	24	42:31.569	2	25
2	99	(Spain) Jorge Lorenzo	Yamaha Factory Racing	Yamaha	24	+4.275	1	20
3	19	(Spain) Álvaro Bautista	San Carlo Honda Gresini	Honda	24	+6.752	5	16
4	4	(Italy) Andrea Dovizioso	Monster Yamaha Tech 3	Yamaha	24	+16.397	6	13
5	1	(Australia) Casey Stoner	Repsol Honda Team	Honda	24	+20.566	7	11
6	6	(Germany) Stefan Bradl	LCR Honda MotoGP	Honda	24	+24.567	8	10
7	46	(Italy) Valentino Rossi	Ducati Team	Ducati	24	+26.072	9	9
8	69	(United States) Nicky Hayden	Ducati Team	Ducati	24	+36.724	10	8
9	21	(Japan) Katsuyuki Nakasuga	Yamaha YSP Racing Team	Yamaha	24	+36.794	11	7
10	8	(Spain) Héctor Barberá	Pramac Racing Team	Ducati	24	+1:10.729	12	6
11	17	(Czech Republic) Karel Abraham	Cardion AB Motoracing	Ducati	24	+1:15.658	15	5
12	41	(Spain) Aleix Espargaró	Power Electronics Aspar	ART	24	+1:22.769	13	4
13	5	(United States) Colin Edwards	NGM Mobile Forward Racing	Suter	24	+1:24.968	16	3
14	77	(United Kingdom) James Ellison	Paul Bird Motorsport	ART	24	+1:29.388	20	2
15	51	(Italy) Michele Pirro	San Carlo Honda Gresini	FTR	24	+1:34.612	18	1
16	84	(Italy) Roberto Rolfo	Speed Master	ART	24	+1:50.853	21	
Ret	35	(United Kingdom) Cal Crutchlow	Monster Yamaha Tech 3	Yamaha	23	Out of fuel	3	
Ret	9	(Italy) Danilo Petrucci	Came IodaRacing Project	Ioda-Suter	23	Retirement	19	
Ret	22	(Spain) Iván Silva	Avintia Blusens	BQR	14	Retirement	22	
Ret	14	(France) Randy de Puniet	Power Electronics Aspar	ART	14	Retirement	14	
Ret	11	(United States) Ben Spies	Yamaha Factory Racing	Yamaha	1	Accident	4	
Ret	68	(Colombia) Yonny Hernández	Avintia Blusens	BQR	1	Accident	17	

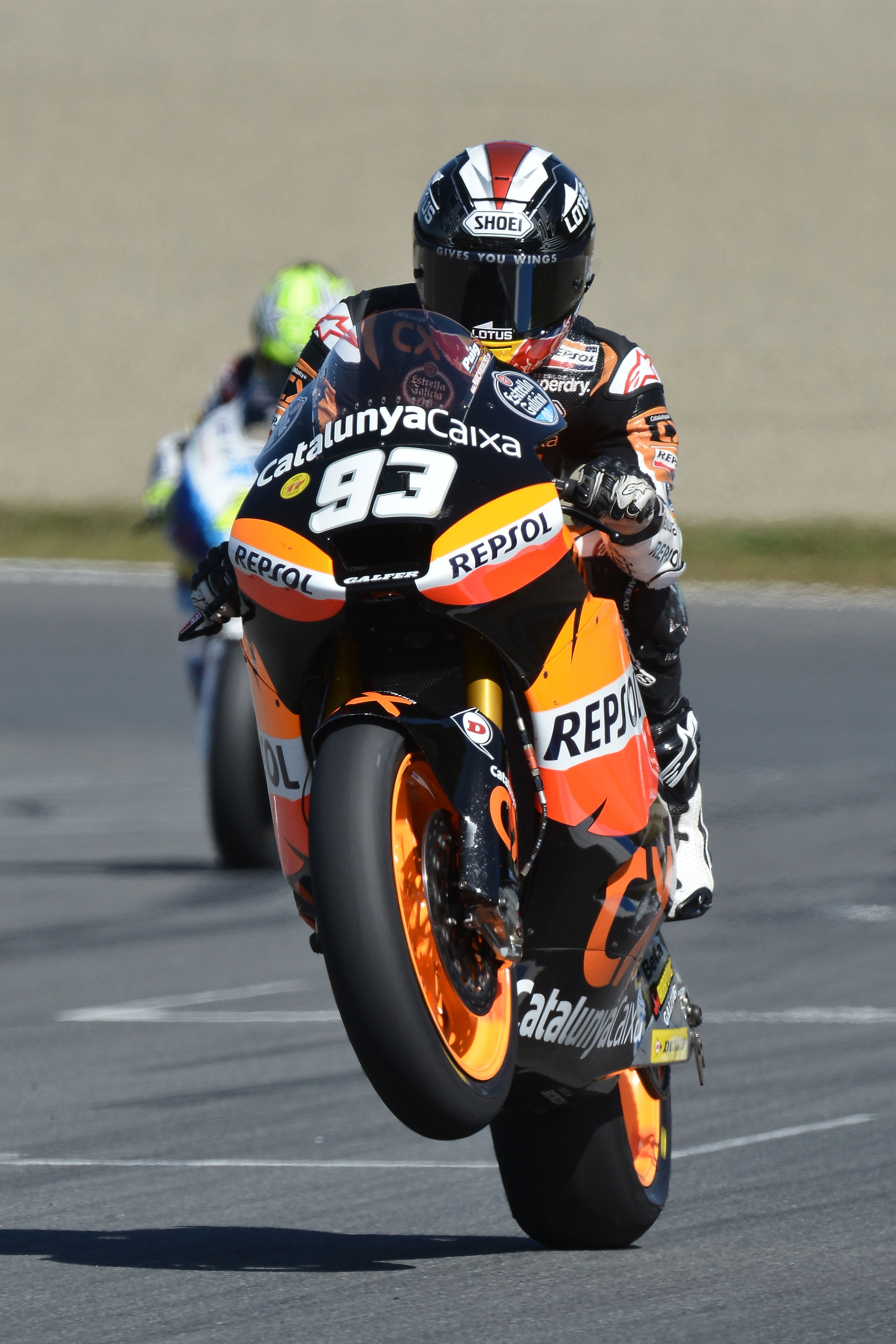
Marc Márquez, doing a wheelie to celebrate winning the Moto2 race.

=== Moto2 ===
Pos	No	Rider	Manufacturer	Laps	Time/Retired	Grid	Points
1	93	(Spain) Marc Márquez	Suter	23	42:56.171	2	25
2	40	(Spain) Pol Espargaró	Kalex	23	+0.415	1	20
3	80	(Spain) Esteve Rabat	Kalex	23	+9.584	3	16
4	45	(United Kingdom) Scott Redding	Kalex	23	+11.069	4	13
5	12	(Switzerland) Thomas Lüthi	Suter	23	+11.595	5	11
6	3	(Italy) Simone Corsi	FTR	23	+18.383	12	10
7	30	(Japan) Takaaki Nakagami	Kalex	23	+18.672	11	9
8	5	(France) Johann Zarco	Motobi	23	+28.226	6	8
9	49	(Spain) Axel Pons	Kalex	23	+28.451	13	7
10	77	(Switzerland) Dominique Aegerter	Suter	23	+28.599	19	6
11	60	(Spain) Julián Simón	Suter	23	+28.971	8	5
12	81	(Spain) Jordi Torres	Suter	23	+29.815	16	4
13	19	(Belgium) Xavier Siméon	Tech 3	23	+39.783	22	3
14	63	(France) Mike Di Meglio	Kalex	23	+39.868	23	2
15	72	(Japan) Yuki Takahashi	FTR	23	+39.970	14	1
16	36	(Finland) Mika Kallio	Kalex	23	+40.763	15	
17	29	(Italy) Andrea Iannone	Speed Up	23	+40.900	18	
18	18	(Spain) Nicolás Terol	Suter	23	+44.379	9	
19	15	(San Marino) Alex de Angelis	FTR	23	+46.507	17	
20	14	(Thailand) Ratthapark Wilairot	Suter	23	+55.561	25	
21	88	(Spain) Ricard Cardús	AJR	23	+55.815	21	
22	75	(Japan) Tomoyoshi Koyama	Suter	23	+56.051	27	
23	23	(Germany) Marcel Schrötter	Bimota	23	+56.492	24	
24	8	(United Kingdom) Gino Rea	Suter	23	+58.417	28	
25	22	(Italy) Alessandro Andreozzi	Speed Up	23	+1:12.398	26	
26	82	(Spain) Elena Rosell	Speed Up	23	+1:39.841	31	
27	57	(Brazil) Eric Granado	Motobi	23	+1:40.787	32	
28	20	(Switzerland) Jesko Raffin	Kalex	22	+1 lap	30	
Ret	24	(Spain) Toni Elías	Kalex	19	Accident	10	
Ret	38	(United Kingdom) Bradley Smith	Tech 3	3	Retirement	7	
DSQ	95	(Australia) Anthony West	Speed Up	23	(+29.609)	20	
DSQ	31	(Japan) Kohta Nozane	FTR	6	Black flag	29	

=== Moto3 ===
Pos	No	Rider	Manufacturer	Laps	Time/Retired	Grid	Points
1	52	(United Kingdom) Danny Kent	KTM	20	40:02.775	1	25
2	25	(Spain) Maverick Viñales	FTR Honda	20	+0.260	2	20
3	19	(Italy) Alessandro Tonucci	FTR Honda	20	+2.352	5	16
4	42	(Spain) Álex Rins	Suter Honda	20	+3.404	13	13
5	63	(Malaysia) Zulfahmi Khairuddin	KTM	20	+3.645	4	11
6	11	(Germany) Sandro Cortese	KTM	20	+13.394	3	10
7	44	(Portugal) Miguel Oliveira	Suter Honda	20	+15.523	11	9
8	96	(France) Louis Rossi	FTR Honda	20	+15.739	8	8
9	7	(Spain) Efrén Vázquez	FTR Honda	20	+15.946	9	7
10	5	(Italy) Romano Fenati	FTR Honda	20	+16.129	10	6
11	61	(Australia) Arthur Sissis	KTM	20	+16.223	14	5
12	27	(Italy) Niccolò Antonelli	FTR Honda	20	+16.371	12	4
13	31	(Finland) Niklas Ajo	KTM	20	+28.368	23	3
14	12	(Spain) Álex Márquez	Suter Honda	20	+28.375	17	2
15	84	(Czech Republic) Jakub Kornfeil	FTR Honda	20	+28.509	19	1
16	81	(Japan) Hyuga Watanabe	Honda	20	+31.071	21	
17	26	(Spain) Adrián Martín	FTR Honda	20	+40.292	16	
18	51	(Japan) Kenta Fujii	TSR Honda	20	+42.822	29	
19	8	(Australia) Jack Miller	Honda	20	+42.896	22	
20	89	(France) Alan Techer	TSR Honda	20	+47.451	20	
21	17	(United Kingdom) John McPhee	KRP Honda	20	+48.245	26	
22	29	(Germany) Luca Amato	Kalex KTM	20	+48.359	31	
23	32	(Spain) Isaac Viñales	FTR Honda	20	+48.439	25	
24	28	(Spain) Josep Rodríguez	FGR Honda	20	+1:03.762	30	
25	30	(Switzerland) Giulian Pedone	Suter Honda	20	+1:10.290	28	
26	99	(United Kingdom) Danny Webb	Mahindra	20	+1:10.484	32	
27	82	(Japan) Yudai Kamei	Honda	19	+1 lap	27	
Ret	94	(Germany) Jonas Folger	Kalex KTM	19	Accident	7	
Ret	39	(Spain) Luis Salom	Kalex KTM	19	Accident	6	
Ret	23	(Spain) Alberto Moncayo	FTR Honda	19	Retirement	15	
Ret	41	(South Africa) Brad Binder	Kalex KTM	14	Retirement	18	
Ret	9	(Germany) Toni Finsterbusch	Honda	4	Retirement	24	
DNS	80	(Italy) Armando Pontone	Ioda		Did not start	33	
DNS	20	(Italy) Riccardo Moretti	Mahindra		Did not start	34	

== Championship standings after the race (MotoGP) ==
Below are the standings for the top five riders and constructors after round fifteen has concluded.

Riders' Championship standings

Pos.	Rider	Points
1	(Spain) Jorge Lorenzo	310
2	(Spain) Dani Pedrosa	282
3	(Australia) Casey Stoner	197
4	(Italy) Andrea Dovizioso	192
5	(Spain) Álvaro Bautista	144

Constructors' Championship standings

Pos.	Constructor	Points
1	(Japan) Honda	337
2	(Japan) Yamaha	326
3	(Italy) Ducati	161
4	(Italy) ART	79
5	(Spain) BQR	31

- Note: Only the top five positions are included for both sets of standings.

Previous race: 2012 Aragon Grand Prix	FIM Grand Prix World Championship; 2012 season	Next race: 2012 Malaysian Grand Prix
Previous race: 2011 Japanese Grand Prix	Japanese motorcycle Grand Prix	Next race: 2013 Japanese Grand Prix
