= 2012 Malaysian motorcycle Grand Prix =

(Malaysia) 2012 Malaysian Grand Prix
Race details
- Race 16 of 18 races in the 2012 Grand Prix motorcycle racing season
- Date: 21 October 2012
- Official name: Malaysian Motorcycle Grand Prix
- Location: Sepang International Circuit
- Course: Permanent racing facility; 5.543 km (3.444 mi)

MotoGP
Pole position
Rider	(Spain) Jorge Lorenzo	Yamaha
Time	2:00.334	
Fastest lap
Rider	(Spain) Dani Pedrosa	Honda
Time	2:14.670	
Podium
First	(Spain) Dani Pedrosa	Honda
Second	(Spain) Jorge Lorenzo	Yamaha
Third	(Australia) Casey Stoner	Honda

Moto2
Pole position
Rider	(Spain) Pol Espargaró	Kalex
Time	2:06.962	
Fastest lap
Rider	(Malaysia) Hafizh Syahrin	FTR
Time	2:23.707	
Podium
First	(San Marino) Alex de Angelis	FTR
Second	(United Kingdom) Gino Rea	Suter
Third	(Malaysia) Hafizh Syahrin	FTR

Moto3
Pole position
Rider	(Malaysia) Zulfahmi Khairuddin	KTM
Time	2:13.885	
Fastest lap
Rider	(Malaysia) Zulfahmi Khairuddin	KTM
Time	2:15.142	
Podium
First	(Germany) Sandro Cortese	KTM
Second	(Malaysia) Zulfahmi Khairuddin	KTM
Third	(Germany) Jonas Folger	Kalex KTM

The 2012 Malaysian motorcycle Grand Prix was the sixteenth round of the 2012 Grand Prix motorcycle racing season. It took place on the weekend of 19–21 October 2012 at the Sepang International Circuit. Sandro Cortese became the first Moto3 world champion.

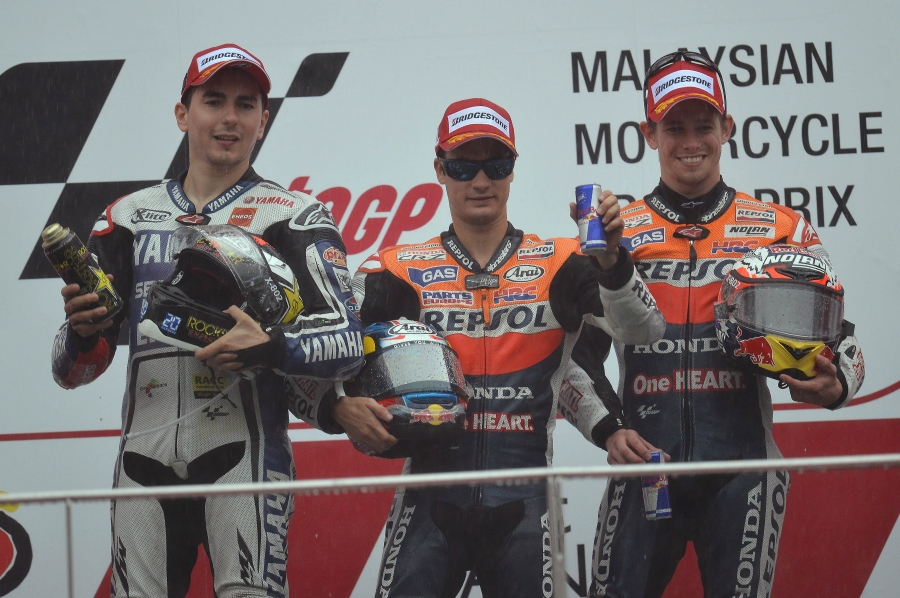
Jorge Lorenzo, Dani Pedrosa and Casey Stoner, celebrating on the podium after finishing second, first and third at the MotoGP race.

== Classification ==
=== MotoGP ===
The race was red-flagged due to the worsening weather conditions. The final results were taken at the end of the 13th lap and full points were awarded.

Pos.	No.	Rider	Team	Manufacturer	Laps	Time/Retired	Grid	Points
1	26	(Spain) Dani Pedrosa	Repsol Honda Team	Honda	13	29:29.049	2	25
2	99	(Spain) Jorge Lorenzo	Yamaha Factory Racing	Yamaha	13	+3.774	1	20
3	1	(Australia) Casey Stoner	Repsol Honda Team	Honda	13	+7.144	4	16
4	69	(United States) Nicky Hayden	Ducati Team	Ducati	13	+10.518	9	13
5	46	(Italy) Valentino Rossi	Ducati Team	Ducati	13	+16.759	11	11
6	19	(Spain) Álvaro Bautista	San Carlo Honda Gresini	Honda	13	+17.276	10	10
7	8	(Spain) Héctor Barberá	Pramac Racing Team	Ducati	13	+50.282	7	9
8	41	(Spain) Aleix Espargaró	Power Electronics Aspar	ART	13	+51.585	12	8
9	77	(United Kingdom) James Ellison	Paul Bird Motorsport	ART	13	+56.676	16	7
10	17	(Czech Republic) Karel Abraham	Cardion AB Motoracing	Ducati	13	+57.622	14	6
11	9	(Italy) Danilo Petrucci	Came IodaRacing Project	Ioda-Suter	13	+1:02.805	17	5
12	51	(Italy) Michele Pirro	San Carlo Honda Gresini	FTR	13	+1:02.891	15	4
13	4	(Italy) Andrea Dovizioso	Monster Yamaha Tech 3	Yamaha	13	+1:28.989	3	3
DSQ	84	(Italy) Roberto Rolfo	Speed Master	ART	13	(+1:23.890)	19	
Ret	6	(Germany) Stefan Bradl	LCR Honda MotoGP	Honda	11	Accident	8	
Ret	35	(United Kingdom) Cal Crutchlow	Monster Yamaha Tech 3	Yamaha	10	Accident	5	
Ret	14	(France) Randy de Puniet	Power Electronics Aspar	ART	10	Accident	13	
Ret	22	(Spain) Iván Silva	Avintia Blusens	BQR	10	Accident	20	
Ret	5	(United States) Colin Edwards	NGM Mobile Forward Racing	Suter	10	Retirement	18	
Ret	11	(United States) Ben Spies	Yamaha Factory Racing	Yamaha	8	Accident	6	
DNS	68	(Colombia) Yonny Hernández	Avintia Blusens	BQR		Injury		

=== Moto2 ===
The race was stopped with the red flag due to weather conditions. The final results were taken at the end of the 15th lap.

Pos	No	Rider	Manufacturer	Laps	Time/Retired	Grid	Points
1	15	(San Marino) Alex de Angelis	FTR	15	36:57.793	9	25
2	8	(United Kingdom) Gino Rea	Suter	15	+1.363	22	20
3	86	(Malaysia) Hafizh Syahrin	FTR	15	+2.941	27	16
4	60	(Spain) Julián Simón	Suter	15	+7.583	13	13
5	29	(Italy) Andrea Iannone	Speed Up	15	+10.062	11	11
6	36	(Finland) Mika Kallio	Kalex	15	+23.078	15	10
7	38	(United Kingdom) Bradley Smith	Tech 3	15	+26.957	6	9
8	77	(Switzerland) Dominique Aegerter	Suter	15	+30.063	10	8
9	80	(Spain) Esteve Rabat	Kalex	15	+31.514	7	7
10	40	(Spain) Pol Espargaró	Kalex	15	+31.746	1	6
11	45	(United Kingdom) Scott Redding	Kalex	15	+37.108	2	5
12	24	(Spain) Toni Elías	Kalex	15	+38.627	28	4
13	49	(Spain) Axel Pons	Kalex	15	+39.095	17	3
14	88	(Spain) Ricard Cardús	AJR	15	+40.686	26	2
15	72	(Japan) Yuki Takahashi	FTR	15	+40.757	23	1
16	75	(Japan) Tomoyoshi Koyama	Suter	15	+41.859	21	
17	23	(Germany) Marcel Schrötter	Bimota	15	+46.760	25	
18	20	(Switzerland) Jesko Raffin	Kalex	15	+1:10.712	30	
19	82	(Spain) Elena Rosell	Speed Up	15	+1:17.807	31	
20	10	(Switzerland) Marco Colandrea	FTR	15	+1:19.320	32	
21	14	(Thailand) Ratthapark Wilairot	Suter	15	+1:27.281	16	
22	3	(Italy) Simone Corsi	FTR	15	+1:41.865	12	
DSQ	95	(Australia) Anthony West	Speed Up	15	(+0.710)	19	
DSQ	22	(Italy) Alessandro Andreozzi	Speed Up	15	(+1:28.788)	29	
Ret	12	(Switzerland) Thomas Lüthi	Suter	14	Accident	8	
Ret	63	(France) Mike Di Meglio	Kalex	14	Retirement	14	
Ret	93	(Spain) Marc Márquez	Suter	12	Accident	3	
Ret	18	(Spain) Nicolás Terol	Suter	12	Accident	20	
Ret	81	(Spain) Jordi Torres	Suter	12	Accident	18	
Ret	57	(Brazil) Eric Granado	Motobi	6	Retirement	33	
Ret	30	(Japan) Takaaki Nakagami	Kalex	2	Accident	4	
Ret	5	(France) Johann Zarco	Motobi	0	Accident	5	
Ret	19	(Belgium) Xavier Siméon	Tech 3	0	Accident	24	

=== Moto3 ===
Pos	No	Rider	Manufacturer	Laps	Time/Retired	Grid	Points
1	11	(Germany) Sandro Cortese	KTM	18	40:54.123	3	25
2	63	(Malaysia) Zulfahmi Khairuddin	KTM	18	+0.028	1	20
3	94	(Germany) Jonas Folger	Kalex KTM	18	+0.247	2	16
4	39	(Spain) Luis Salom	Kalex KTM	18	+8.503	10	13
5	44	(Portugal) Miguel Oliveira	Suter Honda	18	+8.674	5	11
6	52	(United Kingdom) Danny Kent	KTM	18	+9.335	11	10
7	42	(Spain) Álex Rins	Suter Honda	18	+18.973	8	9
8	7	(Spain) Efrén Vázquez	FTR Honda	18	+25.419	6	8
9	31	(Finland) Niklas Ajo	KTM	18	+30.714	16	7
10	26	(Spain) Adrián Martín	FTR Honda	18	+30.763	9	6
11	61	(Australia) Arthur Sissis	KTM	18	+30.886	21	5
12	41	(South Africa) Brad Binder	Kalex KTM	18	+31.019	7	4
13	8	(Australia) Jack Miller	Honda	18	+31.225	19	3
14	12	(Spain) Álex Márquez	Suter Honda	18	+31.313	24	2
15	27	(Italy) Niccolò Antonelli	FTR Honda	18	+31.649	12	1
16	84	(Czech Republic) Jakub Kornfeil	FTR Honda	18	+31.715	14	
17	19	(Italy) Alessandro Tonucci	FTR Honda	18	+31.790	13	
18	23	(Spain) Alberto Moncayo	FTR Honda	18	+32.147	15	
19	32	(Spain) Isaac Viñales	FTR Honda	18	+39.364	18	
20	5	(Italy) Romano Fenati	FTR Honda	18	+45.824	17	
21	89	(France) Alan Techer	TSR Honda	18	+46.622	20	
22	17	(United Kingdom) John McPhee	KRP Honda	18	+46.672	26	
23	9	(Germany) Toni Finsterbusch	Honda	18	+46.790	22	
24	29	(Germany) Luca Amato	Kalex KTM	18	+1:09.086	30	
25	28	(Spain) Josep Rodríguez	FGR Honda	18	+1:15.734	23	
26	30	(Switzerland) Giulian Pedone	Suter Honda	18	+1:33.717	27	
27	51	(Japan) Kenta Fujii	TSR Honda	18	+1:33.811	28	
28	80	(Italy) Armando Pontone	Ioda	18	+1:54.114	29	
Ret	99	(United Kingdom) Danny Webb	Mahindra	8	Retirement	25	
Ret	96	(France) Louis Rossi	FTR Honda	5	Accident	4	
Ret	20	(Italy) Riccardo Moretti	Mahindra	1	Retirement	31	
WD	25	(Spain) Maverick Viñales	FTR Honda		Withdrew		

== Championship standings after the race (MotoGP) ==
Below are the standings for the top five riders and constructors after round sixteen has concluded.

Riders' Championship standings

Pos.	Rider	Points
1	(Spain) Jorge Lorenzo	330
2	(Spain) Dani Pedrosa	307
3	(Australia) Casey Stoner	213
4	(Italy) Andrea Dovizioso	195
5	(Spain) Álvaro Bautista	154

Constructors' Championship standings

Pos.	Constructor	Points
1	(Japan) Honda	362
2	(Japan) Yamaha	346
3	(Italy) Ducati	174
4	(Italy) ART	87
5	(Spain) BQR	31

- Note: Only the top five positions are included for both sets of standings.

Previous race: 2012 Japanese Grand Prix	FIM Grand Prix World Championship; 2012 season	Next race: 2012 Australian Grand Prix
Previous race: 2011 Malaysian Grand Prix	Malaysian motorcycle Grand Prix	Next race: 2013 Malaysian Grand Prix
