= 2012 Czech Republic motorcycle Grand Prix =

2012 Czech Republic Grand Prix
Race details
- Race 12 of 18 races in the 2012 Grand Prix motorcycle racing season
- Date: 26 August 2012
- Official name: bwin Grand Prix České republiky
- Location: Brno Circuit
- Course: Permanent racing facility; 5.403 km (3.357 mi)

MotoGP
Pole position
Rider	(Spain) Jorge Lorenzo	Yamaha
Time	1:55.799	
Fastest lap
Rider	(Spain) Jorge Lorenzo	Yamaha
Time	1:56.274	
Podium
First	(Spain) Dani Pedrosa	Honda
Second	(Spain) Jorge Lorenzo	Yamaha
Third	(United Kingdom) Cal Crutchlow	Yamaha

Moto2
Pole position
Rider	(Spain) Pol Espargaró	Kalex
Time	2:01.953	
Fastest lap
Rider	(Spain) Pol Espargaró	Kalex
Time	2:03.061	
Podium
First	(Spain) Marc Márquez	Suter
Second	(Switzerland) Thomas Lüthi	Suter
Third	(Spain) Pol Espargaró	Kalex

Moto3
Pole position
Rider	(Spain) Maverick Viñales	FTR Honda
Time	2:08.075	
Fastest lap
Rider	(Spain) Luis Salom	Kalex KTM
Time	2:09.659	
Podium
First	(Germany) Jonas Folger	Kalex KTM
Second	(Spain) Luis Salom	Kalex KTM
Third	(Germany) Sandro Cortese	KTM

The 2012 Czech Republic motorcycle Grand Prix was the twelfth round of the 2012 Grand Prix motorcycle racing season. It took place on the weekend of 24–26 August 2012 at the Brno Circuit located in Brno.

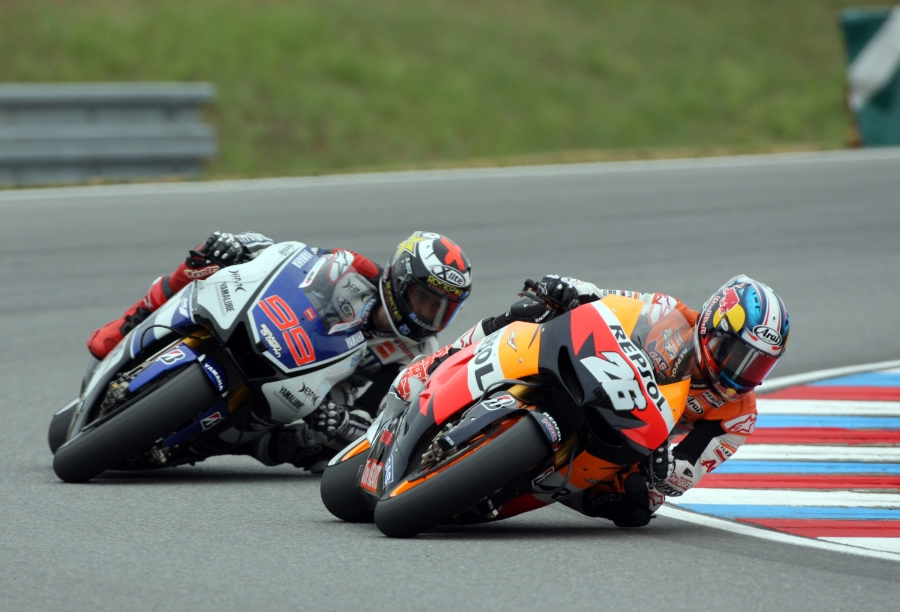
Dani Pedrosa and Jorge Lorenzo, battling for the MotoGP race. Dani went on to win the race, with Jorge finishing second.

== Classification ==
=== MotoGP ===
Pos.	No.	Rider	Team	Manufacturer	Laps	Time/Retired	Grid	Points
1	26	(Spain) Dani Pedrosa	Repsol Honda Team	Honda	22	42:51.570	3	25
2	99	(Spain) Jorge Lorenzo	Yamaha Factory Racing	Yamaha	22	+0.178	1	20
3	35	(United Kingdom) Cal Crutchlow	Monster Yamaha Tech 3	Yamaha	22	+12.343	2	16
4	4	(Italy) Andrea Dovizioso	Monster Yamaha Tech 3	Yamaha	22	+18.591	5	13
5	6	(Germany) Stefan Bradl	LCR Honda MotoGP	Honda	22	+25.582	7	11
6	19	(Spain) Álvaro Bautista	San Carlo Honda Gresini	Honda	22	+29.451	8	10
7	46	(Italy) Valentino Rossi	Ducati Team	Ducati	22	+34.514	6	9
8	14	(France) Randy de Puniet	Power Electronics Aspar	ART	22	+1:04.285	10	8
9	17	(Czech Republic) Karel Abraham	Cardion AB Motoracing	Ducati	22	+1:08.278	9	7
10	41	(Spain) Aleix Espargaró	Power Electronics Aspar	ART	22	+1:09.972	11	6
11	24	(Spain) Toni Elías	Pramac Racing Team	Ducati	22	+1:10.003	13	5
12	68	(Colombia) Yonny Hernández	Avintia Blusens	BQR	22	+1:24.040	12	4
13	5	(United States) Colin Edwards	NGM Mobile Forward Racing	Suter	22	+1:27.898	15	3
14	51	(Italy) Michele Pirro	San Carlo Honda Gresini	FTR	22	+1:36.165	14	2
15	77	(United Kingdom) James Ellison	Paul Bird Motorsport	ART	22	+1:40.565	17	1
16	54	(Italy) Mattia Pasini	Speed Master	ART	22	+1:41.226	16	
17	9	(Italy) Danilo Petrucci	Came IodaRacing Project	Ioda	21	+1 lap	19	
Ret	22	(Spain) Iván Silva	Avintia Blusens	BQR	9	Retirement	18	
Ret	11	(United States) Ben Spies	Yamaha Factory Racing	Yamaha	8	Accident	4	

=== Moto2 ===
Pos	No	Rider	Manufacturer	Laps	Time/Retired	Grid	Points
1	93	(Spain) Marc Márquez	Suter	20	41:19.978	4	25
2	12	(Switzerland) Thomas Lüthi	Suter	20	+0.061	2	20
3	40	(Spain) Pol Espargaró	Kalex	20	+0.440	1	16
4	29	(Italy) Andrea Iannone	Speed Up	20	+0.510	6	13
5	3	(Italy) Simone Corsi	FTR	20	+10.319	5	11
6	15	(San Marino) Alex de Angelis	FTR	20	+10.643	18	10
7	5	(France) Johann Zarco	Motobi	20	+10.717	10	9
8	38	(United Kingdom) Bradley Smith	Tech 3	20	+10.873	15	8
9	36	(Finland) Mika Kallio	Kalex	20	+11.047	12	7
10	80	(Spain) Esteve Rabat	Kalex	20	+11.517	16	6
11	60	(Spain) Julián Simón	Suter	20	+12.388	17	5
12	18	(Spain) Nicolás Terol	Suter	20	+12.603	8	4
13	81	(Spain) Jordi Torres	Suter	20	+14.896	13	3
14	77	(Switzerland) Dominique Aegerter	Suter	20	+17.772	9	2
15	49	(Spain) Axel Pons	Kalex	20	+17.848	11	1
16	63	(France) Mike Di Meglio	MZ-RE Honda	20	+17.906	14	
17	30	(Japan) Takaaki Nakagami	Kalex	20	+18.495	7	
18	72	(Japan) Yuki Takahashi	FTR	20	+30.630	22	
19	44	(Italy) Roberto Rolfo	Suter	20	+34.765	27	
20	14	(Thailand) Ratthapark Wilairot	Suter	20	+34.892	20	
21	4	(Switzerland) Randy Krummenacher	Kalex	20	+36.981	23	
22	23	(Germany) Marcel Schrötter	Bimota	20	+54.677	24	
23	8	(United Kingdom) Gino Rea	Suter	20	+1:19.583	26	
24	22	(Italy) Alessandro Andreozzi	Speed Up	20	+1:23.216	28	
25	57	(Brazil) Eric Granado	Motobi	20	+1:25.144	30	
26	82	(Spain) Elena Rosell	Speed Up	20	+1:32.208	31	
DSQ	95	(Australia) Anthony West	Speed Up	20	(+34.634)	25	
Ret	71	(Italy) Claudio Corti	Kalex	18	Accident	19	
Ret	19	(Belgium) Xavier Siméon	Tech 3	11	Accident	21	
Ret	10	(Switzerland) Marco Colandrea	FTR	11	Accident	30	
Ret	45	(United Kingdom) Scott Redding	Kalex	0	Collision	3	
DNS	76	(Germany) Max Neukirchner	Kalex		Injury		
DNS	88	(Spain) Ricard Cardús	AJR		Injury		

=== Moto3 ===
Pos	No	Rider	Manufacturer	Laps	Time/Retired	Grid	Points
1	94	(Germany) Jonas Folger	Kalex KTM	19	43:03.089	10	25
2	39	(Spain) Luis Salom	Kalex KTM	19	+5.918	5	20
3	11	(Germany) Sandro Cortese	KTM	19	+5.963	2	16
4	25	(Spain) Maverick Viñales	FTR Honda	19	+6.091	1	13
5	42	(Spain) Álex Rins	Suter Honda	19	+6.490	8	11
6	84	(Czech Republic) Jakub Kornfeil	FTR Honda	19	+6.572	7	10
7	52	(United Kingdom) Danny Kent	KTM	19	+8.421	9	9
8	5	(Italy) Romano Fenati	FTR Honda	19	+13.382	13	8
9	44	(Portugal) Miguel Oliveira	Suter Honda	19	+13.909	21	7
10	19	(Italy) Alessandro Tonucci	FTR Honda	19	+22.466	12	6
11	55	(Spain) Héctor Faubel	Kalex KTM	19	+25.974	6	5
12	23	(Spain) Alberto Moncayo	FTR Honda	19	+26.013	14	4
13	26	(Spain) Adrián Martín	FTR Honda	19	+26.549	15	3
14	61	(Australia) Arthur Sissis	KTM	19	+26.708	20	2
15	17	(United Kingdom) John McPhee	KRP Honda	19	+29.753	19	1
16	10	(France) Alexis Masbou	Honda	19	+32.949	17	
17	96	(France) Louis Rossi	FTR Honda	19	+35.869	16	
18	6	(Spain) Joan Olivé	KTM	19	+40.433	24	
19	43	(Germany) Luca Grünwald	Honda	19	+40.951	26	
20	41	(South Africa) Brad Binder	Kalex KTM	19	+41.125	23	
21	12	(Spain) Álex Márquez	Suter Honda	19	+41.271	18	
22	30	(Switzerland) Giulian Pedone	Suter Honda	19	+45.814	32	
23	27	(Italy) Niccolò Antonelli	FTR Honda	19	+55.417	4	
24	53	(Netherlands) Jasper Iwema	FGR Honda	19	+1:25.801	27	
25	7	(Spain) Efrén Vázquez	FTR Honda	19	+1:39.559	11	
26	51	(Japan) Kenta Fujii	TSR Honda	19	+1:44.620	30	
27	3	(Italy) Luigi Morciano	Ioda	19	+2:17.928	28	
28	80	(Italy) Armando Pontone	Ioda	18	+1 lap	31	
Ret	63	(Malaysia) Zulfahmi Khairuddin	KTM	14	Accident	3	
Ret	95	(Czech Republic) Miroslav Popov	Mahindra	14	Accident	29	
Ret	71	(Italy) Michael Ruben Rinaldi	Honda	11	Retirement	25	
Ret	9	(Germany) Toni Finsterbusch	Honda	10	Retirement	22	
DNS	20	(Italy) Riccardo Moretti	Mahindra		Injury		
DNS	32	(Spain) Isaac Viñales	FTR Honda		Injury		
DNS	89	(France) Alan Techer	TSR Honda		Injury		

== Championship standings after the race (MotoGP) ==
Below are the standings for the top five riders and constructors after round twelve has concluded.

Riders' Championship standings

Pos.	Rider	Points
1	(Spain) Jorge Lorenzo	245
2	(Spain) Dani Pedrosa	232
3	(Australia) Casey Stoner	186
4	(Italy) Andrea Dovizioso	150
5	(United Kingdom) Cal Crutchlow	122

Constructors' Championship standings

Pos.	Constructor	Points
1	(Japan) Honda	271
2	(Japan) Yamaha	261
3	(Italy) Ducati	124
4	(Italy) ART	62
5	(Spain) BQR	24

- Note: Only the top five positions are included for both sets of standings.

Previous race: 2012 Indianapolis Grand Prix	FIM Grand Prix World Championship; 2012 season	Next race: 2012 San Marino Grand Prix
Previous race: 2011 Czech Republic Grand Prix	Czech Republic motorcycle Grand Prix	Next race: 2013 Czech Republic Grand Prix
