= 2012 Dutch TT =

(Netherlands) 2012 Dutch Grand Prix
Race details
- Race 7 of 18 races in the 2012 Grand Prix motorcycle racing season
- Date: 30 June 2012
- Official name: Iveco TT Assen
- Location: TT Circuit Assen
- Course: Permanent racing facility; 4.542 km (2.822 mi)

MotoGP
Pole position
Rider	(Australia) Casey Stoner	Honda
Time	1:33.713	
Fastest lap
Rider	(Spain) Dani Pedrosa	Honda
Time	1:34.548	
Podium
First	(Australia) Casey Stoner	Honda
Second	(Spain) Dani Pedrosa	Honda
Third	(Italy) Andrea Dovizioso	Yamaha

Moto2
Pole position
Rider	(Spain) Marc Márquez	Suter
Time	1:37.133	
Fastest lap
Rider	(Spain) Marc Márquez	Suter
Time	1:38.391	
Podium
First	(Spain) Marc Márquez	Suter
Second	(Italy) Andrea Iannone	Speed Up
Third	(United Kingdom) Scott Redding	Kalex

Moto3
Pole position
Rider	(Germany) Sandro Cortese	KTM
Time	1:43.645	
Fastest lap
Rider	(Malaysia) Zulfahmi Khairuddin	KTM
Time	1:44.004	
Podium
First	(Spain) Maverick Viñales	FTR Honda
Second	(Germany) Sandro Cortese	KTM
Third	(United Kingdom) Danny Kent	KTM

The 2012 Dutch TT was the seventh round of the 2012 Grand Prix motorcycle racing season. It was the 82nd Dutch TT, and took place on the weekend of 28–30 June 2012 at the TT Circuit Assen.

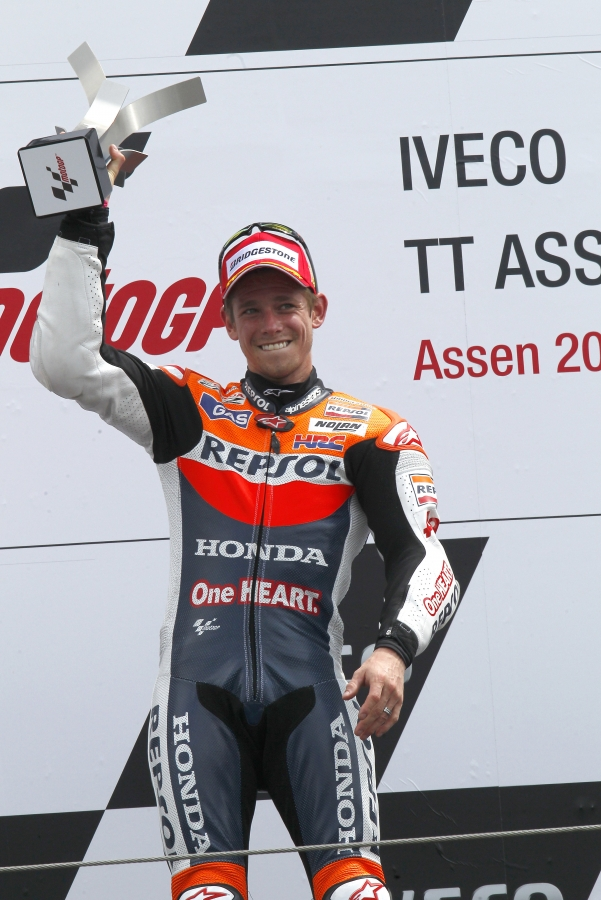
Casey Stoner, celebrating on the podium after winning the MotoGP race.

== MotoGP classification ==
Pos.	No.	Rider	Team	Manufacturer	Laps	Time/Retired	Grid	Points
1	1	(Australia) Casey Stoner	Repsol Honda Team	Honda	26	41:19.855	1	25
2	26	(Spain) Dani Pedrosa	Repsol Honda Team	Honda	26	+4.965	2	20
3	4	(Italy) Andrea Dovizioso	Monster Yamaha Tech 3	Yamaha	26	+11.994	7	16
4	11	(United States) Ben Spies	Yamaha Factory Racing	Yamaha	26	+14.775	6	13
5	35	(United Kingdom) Cal Crutchlow	Monster Yamaha Tech 3	Yamaha	26	+22.074	5	11
6	69	(United States) Nicky Hayden	Ducati Team	Ducati	26	+31.660	9	10
7	8	(Spain) Héctor Barberá	Pramac Racing Team	Ducati	26	+59.107	11	9
8	14	(France) Randy de Puniet	Power Electronics Aspar	ART	26	+1:04.441	12	8
9	51	(Italy) Michele Pirro	San Carlo Honda Gresini	FTR	26	+1:06.980	14	7
10	54	(Italy) Mattia Pasini	Speed Master	ART	26	+1:25.087	15	6
11	9	(Italy) Danilo Petrucci	Came IodaRacing Project	Ioda	26	+1:32.103	16	5
12	22	(Spain) Iván Silva	Avintia Blusens	BQR	26	+1:33.797	20	4
13	46	(Italy) Valentino Rossi	Ducati Team	Ducati	25	+1 lap	10	3
14	77	(United Kingdom) James Ellison	Paul Bird Motorsport	ART	25	+1 lap	19	2
Ret	41	(Spain) Aleix Espargaró	Power Electronics Aspar	ART	14	Retirement	13	
Ret	5	(United States) Colin Edwards	NGM Mobile Forward Racing	Suter	7	Retirement	21	
Ret	68	(Colombia) Yonny Hernández	Avintia Blusens	BQR	5	Accident	18	
Ret	6	(Germany) Stefan Bradl	LCR Honda MotoGP	Honda	1	Accident	4	
Ret	99	(Spain) Jorge Lorenzo	Yamaha Factory Racing	Yamaha	0	Collision	3	
Ret	19	(Spain) Álvaro Bautista	San Carlo Honda Gresini	Honda	0	Collision	8	
DNS	17	(Czech Republic) Karel Abraham	Cardion AB Motoracing	Ducati	0	Injury	17	

== Moto2 classification ==
Pos.	No.	Rider	Manufacturer	Laps	Time/Retired	Grid	Points
1	93	(Spain) Marc Márquez	Suter	24	39:43.170	1	25
2	29	(Italy) Andrea Iannone	Speed Up	24	+0.405	3	20
3	45	(United Kingdom) Scott Redding	Kalex	24	+7.331	7	16
4	80	(Spain) Esteve Rabat	Kalex	24	+7.630	11	13
5	15	(San Marino) Alex de Angelis	FTR	24	+7.852	9	11
6	38	(United Kingdom) Bradley Smith	Tech 3	24	+8.578	8	10
7	77	(Switzerland) Dominique Aegerter	Suter	24	+10.017	5	9
8	5	(France) Johann Zarco	Motobi	24	+14.481	19	8
9	24	(Spain) Toni Elías	Suter	24	+14.714	21	7
10	36	(Finland) Mika Kallio	Kalex	24	+14.734	12	6
11	4	(Switzerland) Randy Krummenacher	Kalex	24	+14.944	4	5
12	30	(Japan) Takaaki Nakagami	Kalex	24	+22.106	14	4
13	19	(Belgium) Xavier Siméon	Tech 3	24	+23.068	24	3
14	60	(Spain) Julián Simón	Suter	24	+23.532	23	2
15	63	(France) Mike Di Meglio	Speed Up	24	+23.733	22	1
16	71	(Italy) Claudio Corti	Kalex	24	+25.619	17	
17	18	(Spain) Nicolás Terol	Suter	24	+25.913	25	
18	88	(Spain) Ricard Cardús	AJR	24	+25.974	15	
19	44	(Italy) Roberto Rolfo	Suter	24	+34.640	16	
20	72	(Japan) Yuki Takahashi	FTR	24	+44.057	29	
21	8	(United Kingdom) Gino Rea	Suter	24	+59.784	26	
22	10	(Switzerland) Marco Colandrea	FTR	24	+1:10.125	32	
23	57	(Brazil) Eric Granado	Motobi	24	+1:12.139	31	
24	82	(Spain) Elena Rosell	Moriwaki	24	+1:33.233	33	
DSQ	95	(Australia) Anthony West	Moriwaki	24	(+44.739)	28	
Ret	76	(Germany) Max Neukirchner	Kalex	23	Accident	18	
Ret	7	(Sweden) Alexander Lundh	MZ-RE Honda	22	Accident	27	
Ret	3	(Italy) Simone Corsi	FTR	14	Accident	6	
Ret	50	(Australia) Damian Cudlin	Bimota	14	Retirement	30	
Ret	49	(Spain) Axel Pons	Kalex	8	Retirement	20	
Ret	14	(Thailand) Ratthapark Wilairot	Suter	5	Accident	13	
Ret	40	(Spain) Pol Espargaró	Kalex	1	Accident	2	
Ret	12	(Switzerland) Thomas Lüthi	Suter	0	Accident	10	
OFFICIAL MOTO2 REPORT

== Moto3 classification ==
Pos.	No.	Rider	Manufacturer	Laps	Time/Retired	Grid	Points
1	25	(Spain) Maverick Viñales	FTR Honda	22	38:45.432	6	25
2	11	(Germany) Sandro Cortese	KTM	22	+0.831	1	20
3	52	(United Kingdom) Danny Kent	KTM	22	+0.842	2	16
4	39	(Spain) Luis Salom	Kalex KTM	22	+0.843	10	13
5	96	(France) Louis Rossi	FTR Honda	22	+1.352	12	11
6	42	(Spain) Álex Rins	Suter Honda	22	+5.033	16	10
7	10	(France) Alexis Masbou	Honda	22	+7.817	7	9
8	31	(Finland) Niklas Ajo	KTM	22	+7.855	5	8
9	7	(Spain) Efrén Vázquez	FTR Honda	22	+8.037	24	7
10	44	(Portugal) Miguel Oliveira	Suter Honda	22	+8.243	8	6
11	63	(Malaysia) Zulfahmi Khairuddin	KTM	22	+8.378	18	5
12	5	(Italy) Romano Fenati	FTR Honda	22	+8.559	17	4
13	84	(Czech Republic) Jakub Kornfeil	FTR Honda	22	+12.133	9	3
14	9	(Germany) Toni Finsterbusch	Honda	22	+12.358	23	2
15	55	(Spain) Héctor Faubel	Kalex KTM	22	+12.533	4	1
16	61	(Australia) Arthur Sissis	KTM	22	+12.654	13	
17	89	(France) Alan Techer	TSR Honda	22	+12.836	14	
18	26	(Spain) Adrián Martín	FTR Honda	22	+12.876	21	
19	23	(Spain) Alberto Moncayo	Kalex KTM	22	+12.944	11	
20	41	(South Africa) Brad Binder	Kalex KTM	22	+21.342	19	
21	32	(Spain) Isaac Viñales	FTR Honda	22	+21.507	26	
22	19	(Italy) Alessandro Tonucci	FTR Honda	22	+21.581	15	
23	15	(Italy) Simone Grotzkyj	Suter Honda	22	+38.872	27	
24	53	(Netherlands) Jasper Iwema	FGR Honda	22	+39.237	31	
25	22	(Netherlands) Bryan Schouten	Honda	22	+39.272	28	
26	40	(Spain) Julián Miralles	Honda	22	+39.377	22	
27	51	(Japan) Kenta Fujii	TSR Honda	22	+39.533	34	
28	3	(Italy) Luigi Morciano	Ioda	22	+41.008	29	
29	21	(Spain) Iván Moreno	FTR Honda	22	+43.193	25	
Ret	77	(Germany) Marcel Schrötter	Mahindra	20	Retirement	30	
Ret	30	(Switzerland) Giulian Pedone	Suter Honda	16	Retirement	32	
Ret	99	(United Kingdom) Danny Webb	Mahindra	15	Accident	20	
Ret	27	(Italy) Niccolò Antonelli	FTR Honda	14	Accident	3	
Ret	94	(Germany) Jonas Folger	Ioda	3	Accident	35	
DSQ	8	(Australia) Jack Miller	Honda	10	Disqualified	33	
OFFICIAL MOTO3 REPORT

== Championship standings after the race (MotoGP) ==
Below are the standings for the top five riders and constructors after round seven has concluded.

Riders' Championship standings

Pos.	Rider	Points
1	(Spain) Jorge Lorenzo	140
2	(Australia) Casey Stoner	140
3	(Spain) Dani Pedrosa	121
4	(United Kingdom) Cal Crutchlow	77
5	(Italy) Andrea Dovizioso	76

Constructors' Championship standings

Pos.	Constructor	Points
1	(Japan) Yamaha	156
2	(Japan) Honda	151
3	(Italy) Ducati	75
4	(Italy) ART	32
5	(United Kingdom) FTR	16

- Note: Only the top five positions are included for both sets of standings.

Previous race: 2012 British Grand Prix	FIM Grand Prix World Championship; 2012 season	Next race: 2012 German Grand Prix
Previous race: 2011 Dutch TT	Dutch TT	Next race: 2013 Dutch TT
