= 2012 Aragon motorcycle Grand Prix =

Motorcycle racing season

2012 Aragon Grand Prix
Race details
- Race 14 of 18 races in the 2012 Grand Prix motorcycle racing season
- Date: 30 September 2012
- Official name: Gran Premio Iveco de Aragón
- Location: MotorLand Aragón
- Course: Permanent racing facility; 5.078 km (3.155 mi)

MotoGP
Pole position
Rider	(Spain) Jorge Lorenzo	Yamaha
Time	1:49.404	
Fastest lap
Rider	(Spain) Dani Pedrosa	Honda
Time	1:49.109	
Podium
First	(Spain) Dani Pedrosa	Honda
Second	(Spain) Jorge Lorenzo	Yamaha
Third	(Italy) Andrea Dovizioso	Yamaha

Moto2
Pole position
Rider	(Italy) Simone Corsi	FTR
Time	1:54.343	
Fastest lap
Rider	(Spain) Pol Espargaró	Kalex
Time	1:54.511	
Podium
First	(Spain) Pol Espargaró	Kalex
Second	(Spain) Marc Márquez	Suter
Third	(United Kingdom) Scott Redding	Kalex

Moto3
Pole position
Rider	(Germany) Jonas Folger	Kalex KTM
Time	2:01.715	
Fastest lap
Rider	(United Kingdom) Danny Kent	KTM
Time	2:01.351	
Podium
First	(Spain) Luis Salom	Kalex KTM
Second	(Germany) Sandro Cortese	KTM
Third	(Germany) Jonas Folger	Kalex KTM

The 2012 Aragon motorcycle Grand Prix was the fourteenth round of the 2012 Grand Prix motorcycle racing season. It took place on the weekend of 28–30 September 2012 at the MotorLand Aragón circuit.

== Classification ==
=== MotoGP ===
Pos.	No.	Rider	Team	Manufacturer	Laps	Time/Retired	Grid	Points
1	26	(Spain) Dani Pedrosa	Repsol Honda Team	Honda	23	42:10.444	2	25
2	99	(Spain) Jorge Lorenzo	Yamaha Factory Racing	Yamaha	23	+6.472	1	20
3	4	(Italy) Andrea Dovizioso	Monster Yamaha Tech 3	Yamaha	23	+11.047	6	16
4	35	(United Kingdom) Cal Crutchlow	Monster Yamaha Tech 3	Yamaha	23	+11.184	3	13
5	11	(United States) Ben Spies	Yamaha Factory Racing	Yamaha	23	+13.786	4	11
6	19	(Spain) Álvaro Bautista	San Carlo Honda Gresini	Honda	23	+28.166	12	10
7	56	(United Kingdom) Jonathan Rea	Repsol Honda Team	Honda	23	+32.290	7	9
8	46	(Italy) Valentino Rossi	Ducati Team	Ducati	23	+44.432	8	8
9	17	(Czech Republic) Karel Abraham	Cardion AB Motoracing	Ducati	23	+57.417	14	7
10	41	(Spain) Aleix Espargaró	Power Electronics Aspar	ART	23	+58.525	11	6
11	14	(France) Randy de Puniet	Power Electronics Aspar	ART	23	+59.863	13	5
12	8	(Spain) Héctor Barberá	Pramac Racing Team	Ducati	23	+1:14.561	10	4
13	68	(Colombia) Yonny Hernández	Avintia Blusens	BQR	23	+1:16.159	19	3
14	77	(United Kingdom) James Ellison	Paul Bird Motorsport	ART	23	+1:16.580	20	2
15	51	(Italy) Michele Pirro	San Carlo Honda Gresini	FTR	23	+1:25.815	15	1
16	54	(Italy) Mattia Pasini	Speed Master	ART	23	+1:31.801	16	
17	9	(Italy) Danilo Petrucci	Came IodaRacing Project	Ioda-Suter	23	+1:42.300	18	
18	5	(United States) Colin Edwards	NGM Mobile Forward Racing	Suter	22	+1 lap	17	
Ret	6	(Germany) Stefan Bradl	LCR Honda MotoGP	Honda	4	Accident	5	
Ret	44	(Spain) David Salom	Avintia Blusens	BQR	3	Retirement	21	
Ret	69	(United States) Nicky Hayden	Ducati Team	Ducati	1	Accident	9	

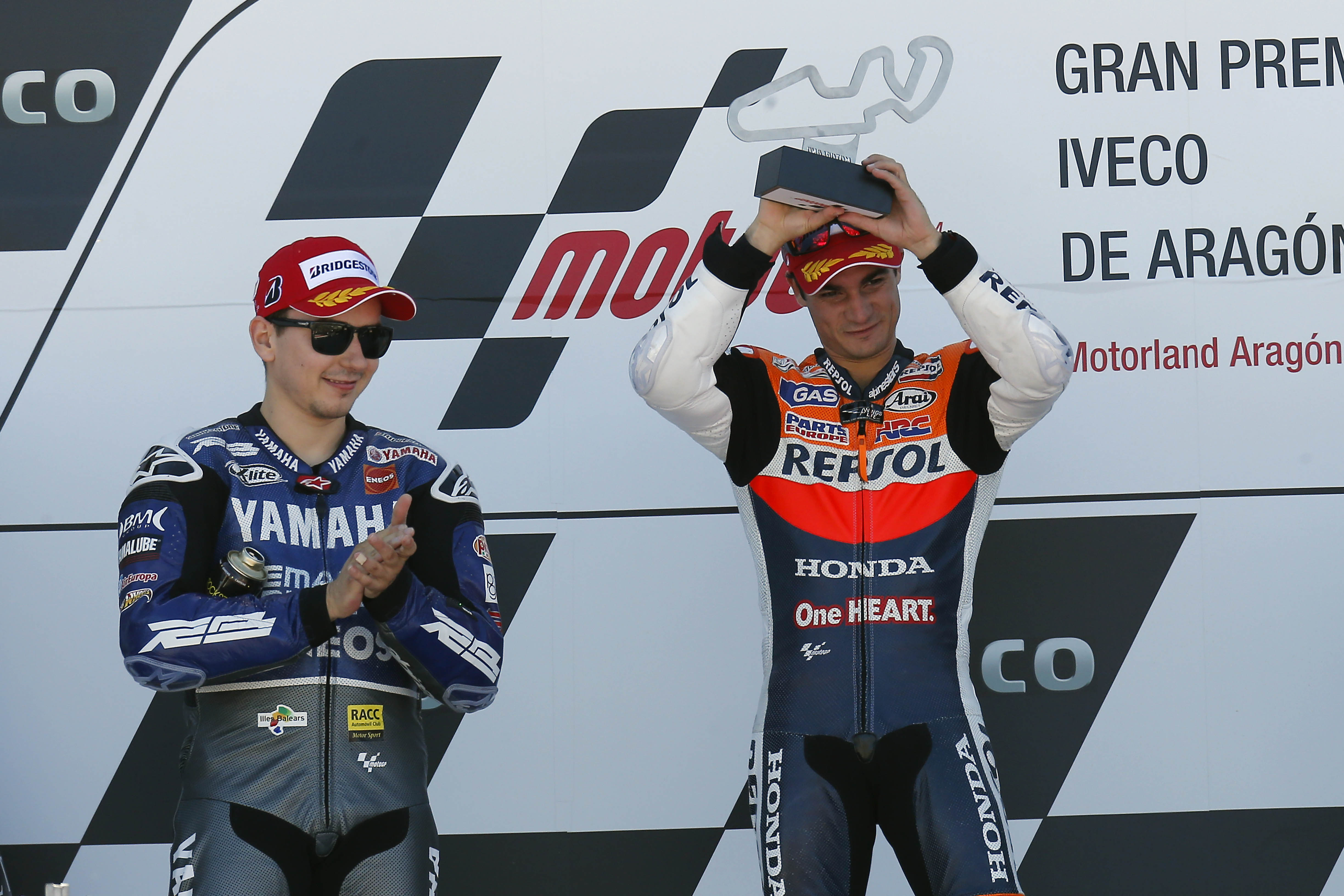
Dani Pedrosa and Jorge Lorenzo, celebrating on the podium after finishing first and second at the MotoGP race.

=== Moto2 ===
Pos	No	Rider	Manufacturer	Laps	Time/Retired	Grid	Points
1	40	(Spain) Pol Espargaró	Kalex	21	40:25.260	2	25
2	93	(Spain) Marc Márquez	Suter	21	+1.447	7	20
3	45	(United Kingdom) Scott Redding	Kalex	21	+1.743	9	16
4	29	(Italy) Andrea Iannone	Speed Up	21	+1.825	3	13
5	38	(United Kingdom) Bradley Smith	Tech 3	21	+2.193	8	11
6	5	(France) Johann Zarco	Motobi	21	+2.999	10	10
7	3	(Italy) Simone Corsi	FTR	21	+4.317	1	9
8	81	(Spain) Jordi Torres	Suter	21	+5.115	5	8
9	71	(Italy) Claudio Corti	Kalex	21	+5.519	4	7
10	12	(Switzerland) Thomas Lüthi	Suter	21	+5.851	19	6
11	80	(Spain) Esteve Rabat	Kalex	21	+6.548	11	5
12	18	(Spain) Nicolás Terol	Suter	21	+7.549	6	4
13	63	(France) Mike Di Meglio	Kalex	21	+14.075	17	3
14	77	(Switzerland) Dominique Aegerter	Suter	21	+17.322	23	2
15	36	(Finland) Mika Kallio	Kalex	21	+17.390	12	1
16	49	(Spain) Axel Pons	Kalex	21	+17.492	14	
17	60	(Spain) Julián Simón	Suter	21	+17.837	21	
18	92	(Spain) Álex Mariñelarena	Suter	21	+30.579	24	
19	23	(Germany) Marcel Schrötter	Bimota	21	+32.748	25	
20	84	(South Africa) Steven Odendaal	AJR	21	+32.879	27	
21	8	(United Kingdom) Gino Rea	Suter	21	+33.271	22	
22	72	(Japan) Yuki Takahashi	FTR	21	+34.311	16	
23	75	(Japan) Tomoyoshi Koyama	Suter	21	+36.563	28	
24	14	(Thailand) Ratthapark Wilairot	Suter	21	+38.261	26	
25	57	(Brazil) Eric Granado	Motobi	21	+56.020	29	
26	82	(Spain) Elena Rosell	Speed Up	21	+1:17.202	31	
27	20	(Switzerland) Jesko Raffin	Kalex	21	+1:17.670	32	
28	10	(Switzerland) Marco Colandrea	FTR	21	+1:18.363	33	
29	30	(Japan) Takaaki Nakagami	Kalex	21	+1:24.244	13	
30	22	(Italy) Alessandro Andreozzi	Speed Up	21	+1:25.153	30	
DSQ	95	(Australia) Anthony West	Speed Up	21	(+5.631)	20	
Ret	19	(Belgium) Xavier Siméon	Tech 3	3	Accident	15	
Ret	15	(San Marino) Alex de Angelis	FTR	1	Accident	18	

=== Moto3 ===
Pos	No	Rider	Manufacturer	Laps	Time/Retired	Grid	Points
1	39	(Spain) Luis Salom	Kalex KTM	20	40:56.391	2	25
2	11	(Germany) Sandro Cortese	KTM	20	+0.155	3	20
3	94	(Germany) Jonas Folger	Kalex KTM	20	+0.362	1	16
4	52	(United Kingdom) Danny Kent	KTM	20	+1.115	5	13
5	7	(Spain) Efrén Vázquez	FTR Honda	20	+1.160	8	11
6	42	(Spain) Álex Rins	Suter Honda	20	+1.765	10	10
7	96	(France) Louis Rossi	FTR Honda	20	+1.839	13	9
8	44	(Portugal) Miguel Oliveira	Suter Honda	20	+1.972	9	8
9	61	(Australia) Arthur Sissis	KTM	20	+2.415	16	7
10	27	(Italy) Niccolò Antonelli	FTR Honda	20	+2.587	11	6
11	84	(Czech Republic) Jakub Kornfeil	FTR Honda	20	+2.845	17	5
12	19	(Italy) Alessandro Tonucci	FTR Honda	20	+3.067	14	4
13	23	(Spain) Alberto Moncayo	FTR Honda	20	+3.763	12	3
14	31	(Finland) Niklas Ajo	KTM	20	+14.899	20	2
15	12	(Spain) Álex Márquez	Suter Honda	20	+15.041	18	1
16	41	(South Africa) Brad Binder	Kalex KTM	20	+36.470	32	
17	32	(Spain) Isaac Viñales	FTR Honda	20	+37.422	29	
18	9	(Germany) Toni Finsterbusch	Honda	20	+37.457	35	
19	8	(Australia) Jack Miller	Honda	20	+38.312	23	
20	29	(Germany) Luca Amato	Kalex KTM	20	+40.831	22	
21	89	(France) Alan Techer	TSR Honda	20	+40.849	30	
22	17	(United Kingdom) John McPhee	KRP Honda	20	+41.879	27	
23	30	(Switzerland) Giulian Pedone	Suter Honda	20	+42.044	21	
24	58	(Spain) Juan Francisco Guevara	FTR Honda	20	+55.896	15	
25	99	(United Kingdom) Danny Webb	Mahindra	20	+1:02.687	28	
26	51	(Japan) Kenta Fujii	TSR Honda	20	+1:18.055	33	
27	80	(Italy) Armando Pontone	Ioda	20	+1:18.374	31	
Ret	26	(Spain) Adrián Martín	FTR Honda	17	Accident	19	
Ret	95	(Czech Republic) Miroslav Popov	Mahindra	16	Retirement	34	
Ret	63	(Malaysia) Zulfahmi Khairuddin	KTM	14	Accident	7	
Ret	5	(Italy) Romano Fenati	FTR Honda	9	Retirement	4	
Ret	49	(Spain) Jorge Navarro	Honda	1	Accident	26	
Ret	53	(Netherlands) Jasper Iwema	FGR Honda	1	Accident	24	
DNS	25	(Spain) Maverick Viñales	FTR Honda		Did not start	6	
DNS	3	(Italy) Luigi Morciano	Ioda		Injury		

== Championship standings after the race (MotoGP) ==
Below are the standings for the top five riders and constructors after round fourteen has concluded.

Riders' Championship standings

Pos.	Rider	Points
1	(Spain) Jorge Lorenzo	290
2	(Spain) Dani Pedrosa	257
3	(Australia) Casey Stoner	186
4	(Italy) Andrea Dovizioso	179
5	(United Kingdom) Cal Crutchlow	135

Constructors' Championship standings

Pos.	Constructor	Points
1	(Japan) Honda	312
2	(Japan) Yamaha	306
3	(Italy) Ducati	152
4	(Italy) ART	75
5	(Spain) BQR	31

- Note: Only the top five positions are included for both sets of standings.

Previous race: 2012 San Marino Grand Prix	FIM Grand Prix World Championship; 2012 season	Next race: 2012 Japanese Grand Prix
Previous race: 2011 Aragon Grand Prix	Aragon motorcycle Grand Prix	Next race: 2013 Aragon Grand Prix
