= 2012 San Marino and Rimini Riviera motorcycle Grand Prix =

2012 San Marino and Rimini Riviera Grand Prix
Race details
- Race 13 of 18 races in the 2012 Grand Prix motorcycle racing season
- Date: 16 September 2012
- Official name: Gran Premio Aperol di San Marino e della Riviera di Rimini
- Location: Misano World Circuit Marco Simoncelli
- Course: Permanent racing facility; 4.226 km (2.626 mi)

MotoGP
Pole position
Rider	(Spain) Dani Pedrosa	Honda
Time	1:33.857	
Fastest lap
Rider	(Spain) Jorge Lorenzo	Yamaha
Time	1:34.398	
Podium
First	(Spain) Jorge Lorenzo	Yamaha
Second	(Italy) Valentino Rossi	Ducati
Third	(Spain) Álvaro Bautista	Honda

Moto2
Pole position
Rider	(Spain) Marc Márquez	Suter
Time	1:38.242	
Fastest lap
Rider	(Spain) Marc Márquez	Suter
Time	1:38.453	
Podium
First	(Spain) Marc Márquez	Suter
Second	(Spain) Pol Espargaró	Kalex
Third	(Italy) Andrea Iannone	Speed Up

Moto3
Pole position
Rider	(Germany) Sandro Cortese	KTM
Time	1:44.201	
Fastest lap
Rider	(Spain) Álex Rins	Suter Honda
Time	1:44.043	
Podium
First	(Germany) Sandro Cortese	KTM
Second	(Spain) Luis Salom	Kalex KTM
Third	(Italy) Romano Fenati	FTR Honda

The 2012 San Marino and Rimini Riviera motorcycle Grand Prix was the thirteenth round of the 2012 Grand Prix motorcycle racing season. It took place on the weekend of 14–16 September 2012 at the Misano World Circuit Marco Simoncelli.

== Classification ==
=== MotoGP ===
Pos.	No.	Rider	Team	Manufacturer	Laps	Time/Retired	Grid	Points
1	99	(Spain) Jorge Lorenzo	Yamaha Factory Racing	Yamaha	27	42:49.836	2	25
2	46	(Italy) Valentino Rossi	Ducati Team	Ducati	27	+4.398	6	20
3	19	(Spain) Álvaro Bautista	San Carlo Honda Gresini	Honda	27	+6.055	5	16
4	4	(Italy) Andrea Dovizioso	Monster Yamaha Tech 3	Yamaha	27	+6.058	7	13
5	11	(United States) Ben Spies	Yamaha Factory Racing	Yamaha	27	+7.543	8	11
6	6	(Germany) Stefan Bradl	LCR Honda MotoGP	Honda	27	+13.272	4	10
7	69	(United States) Nicky Hayden	Ducati Team	Ducati	27	+40.907	10	9
8	56	(United Kingdom) Jonathan Rea	Repsol Honda Team	Honda	27	+43.162	9	8
9	14	(France) Randy de Puniet	Power Electronics Aspar	ART	27	+1:09.627	12	7
10	51	(Italy) Michele Pirro	San Carlo Honda Gresini	FTR	27	+1:13.605	15	6
11	5	(United States) Colin Edwards	NGM Mobile Forward Racing	Suter	27	+1:16.695	20	5
12	68	(Colombia) Yonny Hernández	Avintia Blusens	BQR	27	+1:19.073	18	4
13	77	(United Kingdom) James Ellison	Paul Bird Motorsport	ART	27	+1:19.408	16	3
14	9	(Italy) Danilo Petrucci	Came IodaRacing Project	Ioda-Suter	26	+1 lap	19	2
15	44	(Spain) David Salom	Avintia Blusens	BQR	26	+1 lap	21	1
Ret	41	(Spain) Aleix Espargaró	Power Electronics Aspar	ART	23	Retirement	14	
Ret	35	(United Kingdom) Cal Crutchlow	Monster Yamaha Tech 3	Yamaha	4	Accident	3	
Ret	54	(Italy) Mattia Pasini	Speed Master	ART	1	Accident	17	
Ret	26	(Spain) Dani Pedrosa	Repsol Honda Team	Honda	0	Collision	1	
Ret	8	(Spain) Héctor Barberá	Pramac Racing Team	Ducati	0	Collision	13	
Ret	17	(Czech Republic) Karel Abraham	Cardion AB Motoracing	Ducati	0	Accident	11	

=== Moto2 ===
The Moto2 race was stopped after 3 laps due to an oil spill from Gino Rea's bike. It was restarted and reduced to 14 laps, with the starting grid determined by the running order in the first part. The final result was determined by the second part.

Pos	No	Rider	Manufacturer	Laps	Time/Retired	Grid	Points
1	93	(Spain) Marc Márquez	Suter	14	23:11.278	1	25
2	40	(Spain) Pol Espargaró	Kalex	14	+0.359	2	20
3	29	(Italy) Andrea Iannone	Speed Up	14	+1.634	5	16
4	36	(Finland) Mika Kallio	Kalex	14	+5.078	9	13
5	80	(Spain) Esteve Rabat	Kalex	14	+5.246	7	11
6	77	(Switzerland) Dominique Aegerter	Suter	14	+5.570	17	10
7	45	(United Kingdom) Scott Redding	Kalex	14	+6.364	3	9
8	38	(United Kingdom) Bradley Smith	Tech 3	14	+6.853	10	8
9	12	(Switzerland) Thomas Lüthi	Suter	14	+7.480	6	7
10	5	(France) Johann Zarco	Motobi	14	+7.989	15	6
11	30	(Japan) Takaaki Nakagami	Kalex	14	+8.560	4	5
12	60	(Spain) Julián Simón	Suter	14	+11.509	12	4
13	15	(San Marino) Alex de Angelis	FTR	14	+18.329	20	3
14	71	(Italy) Claudio Corti	Kalex	14	+18.342	16	2
15	18	(Spain) Nicolás Terol	Suter	14	+18.568	23	1
16	81	(Spain) Jordi Torres	Suter	14	+18.687	18	
17	49	(Spain) Axel Pons	Kalex	14	+18.862	21	
18	63	(France) Mike Di Meglio	Kalex	14	+25.645	19	
19	14	(Thailand) Ratthapark Wilairot	Suter	14	+30.003	8	
20	75	(Japan) Tomoyoshi Koyama	Suter	14	+33.121	25	
21	23	(Germany) Marcel Schrötter	Bimota	14	+33.258	28	
22	22	(Italy) Alessandro Andreozzi	Speed Up	14	+33.532	26	
23	10	(Switzerland) Marco Colandrea	FTR	14	+47.303	29	
DSQ	95	(Australia) Anthony West	Speed Up	14	(+32.439)	24	
Ret	72	(Japan) Yuki Takahashi	FTR	8	Collision	11	
Ret	3	(Italy) Simone Corsi	FTR	8	Collision	13	
Ret	19	(Belgium) Xavier Siméon	Tech 3	6	Accident	14	
Ret	82	(Spain) Elena Rosell	Speed Up	1	Accident	30	
Ret	8	(United Kingdom) Gino Rea	Suter	0	Retirement in 1st part	22	
Ret	84	(South Africa) Steven Odendaal	AJR	0	Accident in 1st part	27	
DNS	4	(Switzerland) Randy Krummenacher	Kalex		Injury		

=== Moto3 ===
Pos	No	Rider	Manufacturer	Laps	Time/Retired	Grid	Points
1	11	(Germany) Sandro Cortese	KTM	23	40:22.100	1	25
2	39	(Spain) Luis Salom	Kalex KTM	23	+0.467	5	20
3	5	(Italy) Romano Fenati	FTR Honda	23	+0.937	2	16
4	42	(Spain) Álex Rins	Suter Honda	23	+0.974	17	13
5	25	(Spain) Maverick Viñales	FTR Honda	23	+1.145	11	11
6	94	(Germany) Jonas Folger	Kalex KTM	23	+1.180	6	10
7	7	(Spain) Efrén Vázquez	FTR Honda	23	+1.315	15	9
8	27	(Italy) Niccolò Antonelli	FTR Honda	23	+3.983	3	8
9	44	(Portugal) Miguel Oliveira	Suter Honda	23	+4.376	9	7
10	61	(Australia) Arthur Sissis	KTM	23	+10.872	10	6
11	63	(Malaysia) Zulfahmi Khairuddin	KTM	23	+14.499	8	5
12	52	(United Kingdom) Danny Kent	KTM	23	+14.604	4	4
13	55	(Spain) Héctor Faubel	Kalex KTM	23	+14.880	13	3
14	23	(Spain) Alberto Moncayo	FTR Honda	23	+21.011	16	2
15	84	(Czech Republic) Jakub Kornfeil	FTR Honda	23	+21.062	18	1
16	41	(South Africa) Brad Binder	Kalex KTM	23	+21.777	14	
17	19	(Italy) Alessandro Tonucci	FTR Honda	23	+24.493	7	
18	9	(Germany) Toni Finsterbusch	Honda	23	+59.383	32	
19	95	(Czech Republic) Miroslav Popov	Mahindra	23	+59.685	33	
20	71	(Italy) Michael Ruben Rinaldi	Honda	23	+59.841	31	
21	3	(Italy) Luigi Morciano	Ioda	23	+1:19.973	27	
22	51	(Japan) Kenta Fujii	TSR Honda	23	+1:22.961	34	
23	28	(Spain) Josep Rodríguez	FTR Honda	23	+1:23.080	28	
24	33	(Italy) Stefano Valtulini	Honda	21	+2 laps	29	
Ret	31	(Finland) Niklas Ajo	KTM	21	Retirement	24	
Ret	12	(Spain) Álex Márquez	Suter Honda	4	Accident	25	
Ret	96	(France) Louis Rossi	FTR Honda	3	Retirement	12	
Ret	80	(Italy) Armando Pontone	Ioda	3	Accident	30	
Ret	30	(Switzerland) Giulian Pedone	Suter Honda	3	Collision	26	
Ret	8	(Australia) Jack Miller	Honda	2	Accident	21	
Ret	53	(Netherlands) Jasper Iwema	FGR Honda	1	Accident	22	
Ret	74	(Italy) Kevin Calia	Honda	0	Collision	19	
Ret	89	(France) Alan Techer	TSR Honda	0	Collision	20	
Ret	99	(United Kingdom) Danny Webb	Mahindra	0	Collision	26	
DNS	26	(Spain) Adrián Martín	FTR Honda		Injury		

== Championship standings after the race (MotoGP) ==
Below are the standings for the top five riders and constructors after round thirteen has concluded.

Riders' Championship standings

Pos.	Rider	Points
1	(Spain) Jorge Lorenzo	270
2	(Spain) Dani Pedrosa	232
3	(Australia) Casey Stoner	186
4	(Italy) Andrea Dovizioso	163
5	(United Kingdom) Cal Crutchlow	122

Constructors' Championship standings

Pos.	Constructor	Points
1	(Japan) Honda	287
2	(Japan) Yamaha	286
3	(Italy) Ducati	144
4	(Italy) ART	69
5	(Spain) BQR	28

- Note: Only the top five positions are included for both sets of standings.

Previous race: 2012 Czech Republic Grand Prix	FIM Grand Prix World Championship; 2012 season	Next race: 2012 Aragon Grand Prix
Previous race: 2011 San Marino Grand Prix	San Marino and Rimini Riviera motorcycle Grand Prix	Next race: 2013 San Marino Grand Prix
