= FTR Moto =

British motorcycle parts manufacturer

FTR Moto Ltd
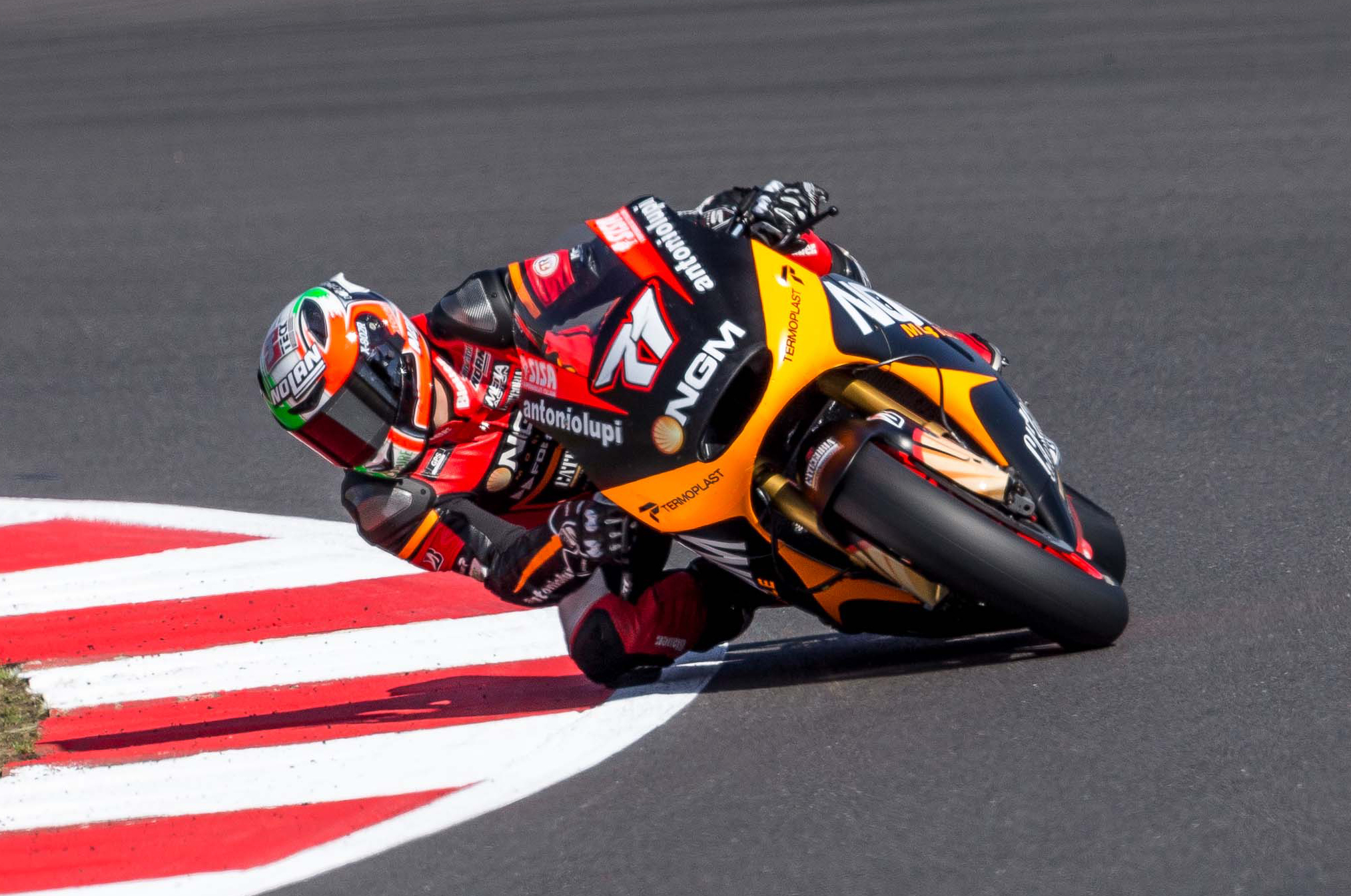
- Type: Private company
- Industry: Mechanical engineering, Motorcycles
- Founded: 1994 as Fabrication Techniques
- Founder: Steve Bones & Mark Taylor
- Defunct: December 12, 2023
- Fate: Dissolved
- Headquarters: Buckingham, England
- Products: Chassis, Frames

FTR Moto Ltd was a British motorcycle parts and frame manufacturer. The name was an acronym for Fabrication Techniques Racing Motorcycles.

== History ==
The company was founded in 1994 as Fabrication Techniques by Steve Bones and in 1995 helped Kenny Roberts and TWR to build the chassis for their Modenas KR3 (later Proton KR3) motorcycle. The firm then supplied several teams in Grand Prix motorcycle racing and Superbike World Championship and in 2001 contributed to the Petronas FP1 chassis.

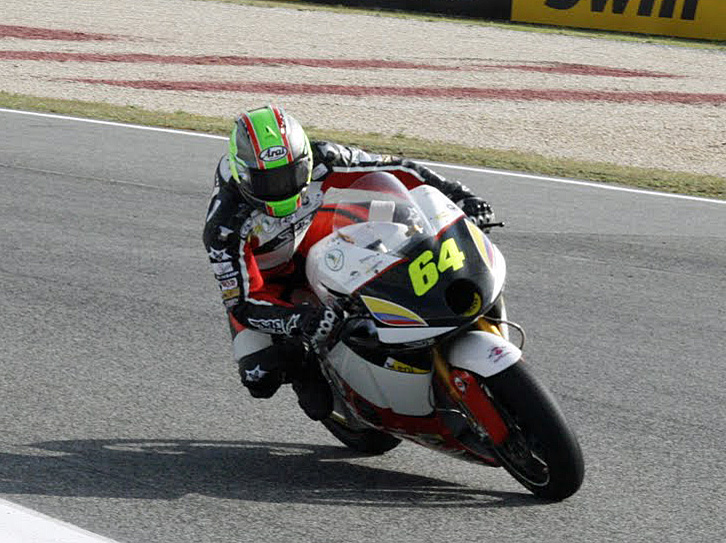
Santiago Hernández on the FTR M211 motorcycle

== Motorcycle chassis manufacturing ==
The FTR Moto brand, related to motorcycle racing chassis production, was launched in 2009. The company constructed a chassis for the first season of the newly established Moto2 class in Grand Prix motorcycle racing. The first victory by the manufacturer was achieved by Karel Abraham in the 2010 Valencian Grand Prix. In 2011 FTR also participated and won the CIV Moto2 Championship with Alessandro Andreozzi. For the 2012 season entered also the then-new Moto3 class and the top class, MotoGP, as a manufacturer. In the 2012 Qatar Grand Prix, Maverick Viñales won the first Moto3 race aboard a Honda-powered FTR chassis, while in MotoGP the company followed the Claiming Rule Teams' regulations and supplied its chassis to the Honda-powered Gresini Racing's bike and to Avintia Racing's Kawasaki-powered BQR (also named BQR-FTR) machines. In 2013, Fabio Quartararo won the FIM CEV Moto3 Junior World Championship aboard a FTR chassis powered by Honda.

== Demise ==
In 2012 the company was sold for over £400,000 to the Heads of the Valleys Development Company, a private business trying to promote the possibility of establishing an entirely new motor racing circuit, provisionally known as the Circuit of Wales.

The business declared substantial losses each year since purchase in 2012 and had stopped producing frames. Motorcycle News reported in 2016 that the new owners wanted production transferred to Wales, and had envisaged a British-built motorcycle, with a British rider, racing on a new British track.

In late 2016 the business entered insolvency, with liabilities believed to be over £500,000.

As of June 2017, administrators Lucas Johnson had instructed a marketer to advertise FTR's Intellectual Property assets for sale, including "Goodwill Rights in the FTR Moto Brand" and "Rights in the Registered Trade Mark and Unregistered Trade Marks". FTR went into liquidation in May 2018 before being dissolved in December 2023.
