= Jerry van de Bunt =

Dutch motorcycle racer

- Nationality: Dutch
- Born: 30 June 1992 (age 34); Hoevelaken, Netherlands
- Current team: Raha 61
- Bike number: 21

Jerry van de Bunt is a Grand Prix motorcycle racer from the Netherlands. He races in the European Supermono Cup aboard a Raha.

== Career statistics ==
=== FIM CEV Moto3 Junior World Championship ===
==== Races by year ====
(key) (Races in bold indicate pole position, races in italics indicate fastest lap)

Year	Bike	1	2	3	4	5	6	7	8	9	10	11	12	Pos	Pts
2016	Honda	VAL1	VAL2	LMS	ARA	CAT1	CAT2	ALB	ALG	JER1	JER2	VAL1; DNQ	VAL2; DNQ	NC	0

=== Grand Prix motorcycle racing ===
==== By season ====
Season	Class	Motorcycle	Team	Number	Race	Win	Podium	Pole	FLap	Pts	Plcd
2008	125cc	Aprilia	Degraaf Grand Prix	83	1	0	0	0	0	0	NC
2010	125cc	Honda	Jerrys Racing	67	1	0	0	0	0	0	NC
2011	125cc	Honda	JerrysRacingTeam	67	1	0	0	0	0	0	NC
Total					**3**	**0**	**0**	**0**	**0**	**0**	

==== Races by year ====
Year	Class	Bike	1	2	3	4	5	6	7	8	9	10	11	12	13	14	15	16	17	Pos	Points
2008	125cc	Aprilia	QAT	SPA	POR	CHN	FRA	ITA	CAT	GBR	NED; 30	GER	CZE	RSM	INP	JPN	AUS	MAL	VAL	NC	0
2010	125cc	Honda	QAT	SPA	FRA	ITA	GBR	NED; Ret	CAT	GER	CZE	INP	RSM	ARA	JPN	MAL	AUS	POR	VAL	NC	0
2011	125cc	Honda	QAT	SPA	POR	FRA	CAT	GBR	NED	ITA	GER; 29	CZE	INP	RSM	ARA	JPN	AUS	MAL	VAL	NC	0
