= S. Sarath Kumar =

Indian motorcycle rider

Shankar Sarath Kumar
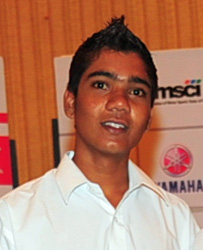
- Shankar Sarath Kumar
- Nationality: (India) Indian
- Born: 15 December 1991 (age 34); Chennai, India
- Current team: Honda Ten10 Racing
- Bike number: 69
Motorcycle racing career statistics
125cc World Championship
Active years	2011
Manufacturers	Aprilia
Championships	0
2011 championship position	NC (0 pts)
Starts / Wins / Podiums / Poles / F. laps / Points; 1 / 0 / 0 / 0 / 0 / 0

Shankar Sarath Kumar (born 15 December 1991 in Chennai, India) is a professional motorcycle road racer and a multiple Indian national champion. He became the first Indian to take part in the FIM Motorcycle World Championship competing in the 125cc class in the 2011 Portugal Grand Prix. He took part in only three rounds. His efforts to re-enter Moto3 for the 2014 season failed due to lack of sponsors.

== Early life and education ==
Kumar hails from a lower-middle-class family in Koyambedu, Chennai. He completed his secondary schooling at the Tamil Nadu Open University in 2008. His mother, Shanthi, is a beautician and he also has a sister. Even after taking part in the MotoGP races, he worked as a Taxi driver to meet his expenses. He had to drop out of his BBA distance education at Tamil Nadu Open University to focus on motorsports.

Kumar attended the California Superbike School in February, 2010. The school was conducted by Keith Code at the MMSC Track in Chennai. His tuition was paid by the Madras Motor Sports Club to encourage the young rider.

== Career ==
Kumar started racing as a privateer on a TVS Apache 150cc 4-stroke in the 'TVS Race a bike scheme class'. He finished second in both the JK Junior Championship and the Summer Cup 2008. In 2008, Kumar joined TVS Racing and won the National Champion title in the up to 130cc 4-stroke novice class. He also raced in the Indian National Motorcycle Supersport 165cc class with the Honda team. He began his racing career in 2008 with the Ten10 Racing Team, now WTR-Ten10 Racing. Ramji Govindarajan was his first coach.

== Achievements ==
In September 2009, Kumar joined the Ten10 Racing team during the third round, competing in the up to 165cc four-stroke open class, where he finished fourth. As a wildcard entry, he participated in the FIM UAM Indian round of the Asia GP championship in the 'Honda Stunner' class, finishing seventh and eighth.

In January 2010, Kumar won the Indian four-stroke up to 165cc open class at the MECO Endurance Race, a 90-minute non-stop event. He was awarded the title of Best Rider of the Day. During the MRF International Challenge 2010, Kumar secured first place in the Yamaha 135cc one-make under-bone class and second place in the Group D, four-stroke up to 165cc open class.

In August 2010, Kumar participated in the FIM UAM Asia GP Indian Championship round as a wildcard entry in the 'Honda Stunner' class, finishing fourth and fifth in the two races respectively.

In 2009, based on his performance during the FIM UAM Asia GP (Indian round), the Federation of Motor Sports Clubs of India offered Kumar a sponsored entry for the Japan round of the UAM championship in September 2010. He finished seventh and eighth and set the second-fastest lap time at the circuit for his class at 1:54.3.

In 2012, Kumar helped Mahindra Racing to a third-place finish in the 125 GP event at the CIV Italian Championship in Monza.

In 2016, Kumar took part in the Supersport 600cc class of the Asian Road Racing Championship at Sentul, Indonesia. T-Riding for Pro Yuzy NTS Honda Racing team, he also took part in the round at Buddh International Circuit on 1 and 2 October 2016.

In 2019, Kumar won the National title in Pro-stock up to 165cc. He was the 2010 Indian National Champion in the 165cc expert class and the 2008 National Champion in the 130cc 4-stroke novice class.

== Career statistics ==
=== By season ===
Season	Class	Motorcycle	Team	Number	Race	Win	Podium	Pole	FLap	Pts	Plcd
2011	125cc	Aprilia	WTR-Ten10 Racing	69	1	0	0	0	0	0	NC
Total					1	0	0	0	0	0	

=== By class ===
Class	Seasons	1st GP	1st Pod	1st Win	Race	Win	Podiums	Pole	FLap	Pts	WChmp
125cc	2011	2011 Portugal			1	0	0	0	0	0	0
Total					1	0	0	0	0	0	

=== Races by year ===
(key)

Year	Class	Bike	1	2	3	4	5	6	7	8	9	10	11	12	13	14	15	16	17	Final Pos	Pts
2011	125cc	Aprilia	QAT; DNQ	SPA; DNQ	POR; 24	FRA	CAT	GBR	NED	ITA	GER	CZE	INP	RSM	ARA	JPN	AUS	MAL	VAL	NC	0
