= Raffaele De Rosa =

Italian motorcycle racer

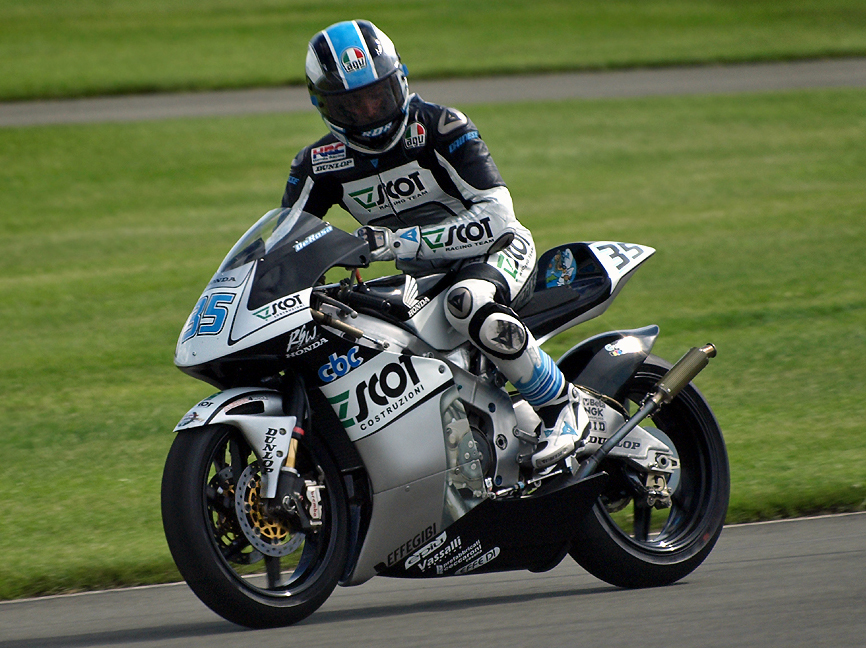
- De Rosa at the 2009 British Grand Prix
- Nationality: Italian
- Born: 25 March 1987 (age 39); Naples, Italy
- Current team: QJMotor Factory Racing
- Bike number: 3
Motorcycle racing career statistics
Moto2 World Championship
Active years	2010–2011
Manufacturers	Tech 3, Moriwaki, FTR, Suter
Championships	0
2011 championship position	NC (0 pts)
Starts / Wins / Podiums / Poles / F. laps / Points; 30 / 0 / 0 / 0 / 0 / 15
250cc World Championship
Active years	2009
Manufacturers	Honda
Championships	0
2009 championship position	6th (122 pts)
Starts / Wins / Podiums / Poles / F. laps / Points; 16 / 0 / 2 / 1 / 1 / 122
125cc World Championship
Active years	2004–2008
Manufacturers	Honda, Aprilia, KTM
Championships	0
2008 championship position	18th (37 pts)
Starts / Wins / Podiums / Poles / F. laps / Points; 67 / 0 / 0 / 1 / 2 / 143
Superbike World Championship
Active years	2012, 2016–2017
Manufacturers	Honda, BMW
Championships	0
2017 championship position	15th (53 pts)
Starts / Wins / Podiums / Poles / F. laps / Points; 26 / 0 / 0 / 0 / 0 / 69
Supersport World Championship
Active years	2012–2014, 2018–
Manufacturers	Honda, MV Agusta, Kawasaki, Ducati, QJ Motor
Championships	0
2025 championship position	23rd (29 pts)
Starts / Wins / Podiums / Poles / F. laps / Points; 179 / 1 / 19 / 0 / 5 / 966

Raffaele De Rosa (born 25 March 1987 in Naples) is an Italian motorcycle racer currently competing for the QJMotor Factory Racing team in the Supersport World Championship. He has competed mainly in the Supersport category, and most notably won the FIM Superstock 1000 Cup in 2016.

== Career ==
=== 125cc World Championship (2004–2008) ===
De Rosa made his World Championship debut in the 125cc class in the 2005 season.

=== 250cc/Moto2 World Championship (2009–2011) ===
De Rosa was the Rookie of The Year in the 250cc Class in 2009.

== Career statistics ==
=== CIV Championship (Campionato Italiano Velocita) ===
==== Races by year ====
(key) (Races in bold indicate pole position; races in italics indicate fastest lap)

Year	Class	Bike	1	2	3	4	5	Pos	Pts
2003	125cc	Aprilia	MIS1; 15	MUG1; Ret	MIS1; 15	MUG2; Ret	VAL; Ret	29th	2
2004	125cc	Aprilia	MUG; Ret	IMO	VAL1	MIS; 10	VAL2; 6	15th	16

=== Grand Prix motorcycle racing ===
==== Races by year ====
(key) (Races in bold indicate pole position, races in italics indicate fastest lap)

Year	Class	Bike	1	2	3	4	5	6	7	8	9	10	11	12	13	14	15	16	17	Pos	Pts
2004	125cc	Honda	RSA	SPA	FRA	ITA	CAT	NED	BRA	GER	GBR; 24	CZE	POR	JPN	QAT	MAL	AUS	VAL		NC	0
2005	125cc	Aprilia	SPA; Ret	POR; 24	CHN; 28	FRA; 20	ITA; 15	CAT; 22	NED; Ret	GBR; 20	GER; 15	CZE; 17	JPN; 16	MAL; Ret	QAT; 13	AUS; 11	TUR; Ret	VAL; 13		23rd	13
2006	125cc	Aprilia	SPA; Ret	QAT; 12	TUR; 24	CHN; 12	FRA; 6	ITA; 17	CAT; 12	NED; 10	GBR; Ret	GER; 20	CZE; Ret	MAL; Ret	AUS; 7	JPN; Ret	POR; 19	VAL; Ret		16th	37
2007	125cc	Aprilia	QAT; 4	SPA; Ret	TUR; 4	CHN; 12	FRA; Ret	ITA; 14	CAT; Ret	GBR; 8	NED; 14	GER; Ret	CZE; 18	RSM; 9	POR; 9	JPN; Ret	AUS; Ret	MAL; 28	VAL; Ret	16th	56
2008	125cc	KTM	QAT; Ret	SPA; 11	POR; Ret	CHN; 9	FRA; 9	**ITA**; 13	CAT; Ret	GBR; 14	NED; 10	GER; Ret	CZE; Ret	RSM; Ret	INP; 13	JPN; 12	AUS; Ret	MAL; Ret	VAL; Ret	18th	37
2009	250cc	Honda	QAT; 5	JPN; 12	SPA; 10	FRA; 6	ITA; 9	CAT; 9	NED; 10	GER; 9	GBR; 7	CZE; 6	INP; 11	RSM; 8	POR; Ret	**AUS**; 3	MAL; Ret	VAL; 3		6th	122
2010	Moto2	Tech 3	QAT; Ret	SPA; 20	FRA; Ret	ITA; Ret	GBR; 28	NED; 27	CAT; 16	GER; Ret	CZE; 15	INP; Ret	RSM; 13	ARA; Ret	JPN; 15	MAL; Ret	AUS; 16	POR; 6	VAL; 24	27th	15
2011	Moto2	Moriwaki	QAT; 30	SPA; 25	POR; 16	FRA; 19	CAT													NC	0
2011	Moto2	FTR						GBR; 21	NED											NC	0
2011	Moto2	Suter								ITA; Ret	GER	CZE	INP; 23	RSM; 22	ARA; Ret	JPN; Ret	AUS; 20	MAL; Ret	VAL; Ret	NC	0

=== Superbike World Championship ===
==== Races by year ====
(key) (Races in bold indicate pole position, races in italics indicate fastest lap)

Year	Bike	1		2		3		4		5		6		7		8		9		10		11		12		13		14		Pos	Pts
Year	Bike	R1	R2	R1	R2	R1	R2	R1	R2	R1	R2	R1	R2	R1	R2	R1	R2	R1	R2	R1	R2	R1	R2	R1	R2	R1	R2	R1	R2	Pos	Pts
2012	Honda	AUS; Ret	AUS; 17	ITA	ITA	NED	NED	ITA	ITA	EUR	EUR	USA	USA	SMR	SMR	SPA	SPA	CZE	CZE	GBR	GBR	RUS	RUS	GER	GER	POR	POR	FRA	FRA	NC	0
2016	BMW	AUS	AUS	THA	THA	SPA	SPA	NED	NED	ITA	ITA	MAL	MAL	GBR	GBR	ITA	ITA	USA; Ret	USA; 11	GER	GER	FRA	FRA	SPA	SPA	QAT; 12	QAT; 9			21st	16
2017	BMW	AUS	AUS	THA	THA	SPA	SPA	NED; 13	NED; 17	ITA; 14	ITA; 16	GBR; 15	GBR; 10	ITA; 10	ITA; 7	USA; 13	USA; Ret	GER; Ret	GER; 15	POR; 11	POR; Ret	FRA; 13	FRA; 10	SPA; Ret	SPA; 13	QAT; Ret	QAT; 11			15th	53

=== Supersport World Championship ===
==== Races by year ====
(key) (Races in bold indicate pole position, races in italics indicate fastest lap)

Year	Bike	1	2	3	4	5	6	7	8	9	10	11	12	13	Pos	Pts
2012	Honda	AUS	ITA	NED	ITA; 10	EUR; Ret	SMR; 11	SPA; 13	CZE; 16	GBR; 15	RUS	GER	POR	FRA	24th	15
2013	Honda	AUS; Ret	SPA; Ret	NED; 17	ITA; 15	GBR; 13	POR; 9	ITA; 11	RUS; C	GBR; Ret	GER; 14	TUR; 13	FRA; 12	SPA; 21	19th	25
2014	Honda	AUS; 3	SPA; 6	NED; 8	ITA; 12	GBR; 9	MAL; 7	SMR; 20	POR; 4	SPA; Ret	FRA	QAT; 13			10th	70
2018	MV Agusta	AUS; 6	THA; 7	SPA; Ret	NED; 3	ITA; 3	GBR; 3	CZE; 3	ITA; 2	POR; 4	FRA; 7	ARG; Ret	QAT; 8		6th	133
2019	MV Agusta	AUS; 18	THA; 5	SPA; 2	NED; Ret	ITA; 3	ESP; 5	ITA; Ret	GBR; 5	POR; Ret	FRA; 4	ARG; 6	QAT; 7		6th	101

Year	Bike	1		2		3		4		5		6		7		8		9		10		11		12		Pos	Pts
Year	Bike	R1	R2	R1	R2	R1	R2	R1	R2	R1	R2	R1	R2	R1	R2	R1	R2	R1	R2	R1	R2	R1	R2	R1	R2	Pos	Pts
2020	MV Agusta	AUS; DSQ		SPA; 5	SPA; 5	POR; 3	POR; 12	SPA; 4	SPA; 3	SPA; 2	SPA; Ret	SPA; 14	SPA; 4	FRA; 4	FRA; Ret	POR; Ret	POR; 3									6th	135
2021	Kawasaki	SPA; 9	SPA; 2	POR; 6	POR; Ret	ITA; Ret	ITA; 7	NED; Ret	NED; Ret	CZE; 12	CZE; 10	SPA; Ret	SPA; 9	FRA; 9	FRA; 9	SPA; 3	SPA; 2	SPA; C	SPA; 7	POR; 4	POR; 14	ARG; Ret	ARG; Ret	INA; 1	INA; 5	7th	173
2022	Ducati	SPA; 16	SPA; 9	NED; 9	NED; 15	POR; 22	POR; Ret	ITA; 22	ITA; 10	GBR; 3	GBR; 6	CZE; Ret	CZE; 20	FRA; 12	FRA; 14	SPA; 12	SPA; Ret	POR; 6	POR; 2	ARG; 2	ARG; Ret	INA; 9	INA; 4	AUS; 6	AUS; 6	9th	147
2023	Ducati	AUS; 17	AUS; 7	INA; Ret	INA; 7	NED; 9	NED; 9	SPA; 15	SPA; 10	EMI; Ret	EMI; 26	GBR; 7	GBR; 9	ITA; 6	ITA; 5	CZE; 4	CZE; 10	FRA; 16	FRA; Ret	SPA; 5	SPA; 9	POR; 8	POR; 8	SPA; 7	SPA; Ret	10th	138
2024	QJ Motor	AUS	AUS	SPA; Ret	SPA; 31	NED; 18	NED; 27	ITA; 24	ITA; 25	GBR; 27	GBR; 22	CZE; 23	CZE; 24	POR; Ret	POR; 23	FRA; 23	FRA; 28	ITA; 19	ITA; 25	SPA; 24	SPA; 25	POR; 17	POR; 16	SPA; 21	SPA; 22	40th	0
2025	QJ Motor	AUS	AUS	POR; 21	POR; Ret	NED; DNS	NED; DNS	ITA; 23	ITA; 22	CZE; 15	CZE; 21	EMI; Ret	EMI; Ret	GBR; 27	GBR; 25	HUN; Ret	HUN; 20	FRA; 13	FRA; 20	ARA; 19	ARA; 15	EST; 9	EST; 10	SPA; 11	SPA; 10	23rd	29
2026	QJMotor	AUS	AUS	POR	POR	NED	NED	HUN	HUN	CZE	CZE	ARA	ARA	EMI	EMI	GBR	GBR	FRA	FRA	ITA	ITA	POR	POR	SPA	SPA	NC*	0*

=== FIM Superstock 1000 Cup ===
==== Races by year ====
(key) (Races in bold indicate pole position, races in italics indicate fastest lap)

Year	Bike	1	2	3	4	5	6	7	8	Pos	Pts
2015	Ducati	SPA; 4	NED; 2	ITA; Ret	GBR; 3	POR; 3	ITA; 2	SPA; 2	FRA; 3	3rd	121
2016	BMW	SPA; 3	NED; 1	ITA; 3	**GBR**; 1	ITA; 19	**GER**; 10	FRA; 3	SPA; 5	1st	115
