= WTR-Ten10 Racing =

Ten10 Racing
- 2019 name: Ten10 Racing
- Base: Bangalore, India
- Principal: Ramji Govindarajan
- Riders' Championships: Indian National Upto 165cc Group B: 2010: S. Sarath Kumar; Indian National Pro Stock 165: 2015: Mathana Kumar; 2016: Rajiv Sethu; 2017: Aravind B 2018: Anish Shetty; 2019: S. Sarath Kumar; Indian National Pro Stock 300: 2019: Anish Shetty; Indian National Honda CBR250 Cup: 2015: S. Sarath Kumar; 2016: Mathana Kumar; 2017: Rajiv Sethu; 2018: Abhishek Vasudev
- Teams' Championships: Indian National Upto 165cc Group C: 2012, 2015, 2016; Indian National Pro Stock 165: 2017, 2018, 2019; Indian National Pro Stock 300: 2019; Indian National Honda CBR250 Cup: 2015, 2016, 2017, 2018

WTR-Ten10 Racing was a partnership made between the WTR (San Marino) and Ten10 Racing (Bangalore, India) teams. It was the first Indian team to participate in Grand Prix motorcycle racing.

== Ten10 Racing ==
Ten10 Racing is a professional motorcycle racing team that was founded in 2008 by Ramji Govindarajan, a former racer, with the goal of providing a platform for young and unrecognized talent in the Indian motorcycle racing scene. The team was launched in the National Championships of 2009 after nearly a year of planning. Govindarajan connected with individuals who shared his passion for the sport and the vision of maintaining motorcycle racing as a serious and professional business model.

With rider, Sarath Kumar, Ten10 participated in circuit racing and was involved in several record-setting performances within Indian motorsport.

The team is currently competing in the '165cc' Indian bike category and the 'Superbikes' category in the Indian National Championship. The team participated in the Sidvin India National Motorcycle Racing Championship and the Malaysian Super Series in 2017.

== WTR Team ==
After much research into Indian motorcycle racing, the WTR team approached Ten10 Racing with the idea of entering Grand Prix motorcycle racing. WTR Racing was a respected name in the business and participated in Grand Prix racing from 2004 to 2009. It represented the Republic of San Marino, where the team is based.

== Statistics ==
- 2004 World Championship:
  - 250cc Riders: Taro Sekiguchi, Max Sabbatani
  - Bike: Yamaha TZ250
- 2005 World Championship:
  - 125cc Riders: Dario Giuseppetti, Karel Abraham
  - Bike: Aprilia RS125R
- 2006 World Championship:
  - 125cc Riders: Michele Pirro, Andrea Iannone
  - 250cc Riders: Michele Danese, Jordi Carchano
  - Bikes: Aprilia RS125R, Aprilia RSV250
- 2007 World Championship:
  - 125cc Riders: Andrea Iannone, Stefano Bianco
  - Bike: Aprilia RS125R
- 2008 World Championship:
  - 125cc Riders: Stefano Bianco, Bastien Chesaux
  - Bike: Aprilia RS125R
- 2009 World Championship:
  - 125cc Riders: Johann Zarco
  - 250cc Riders: Alex Baldolini
  - Bikes: Aprilia RS125R, Aprilia RSV250

== Riders ==
Name	Category	Bike	Bike No.
Emmanuel Jebaraj	Group 'A' 600cc Expert	Yamaha R6	59
Vikram V.	Group 'A' 600cc Expert	Yamaha R6	28
S. Sarath Kumar	Group 'B' 165cc Expert	Yamaha R15	69
Shyam Shankar	Group 'B' 165cc Expert	Yamaha R15	3
S. Padmanaban	Group 'D' 125cc Novice	Honda Stunner	-

== Events ==
- JK Tyre FMSCI National Racing Championship (2011)
- Rolon Indian National Motorcycle Racing Championship (2012)
- Asia Road Racing Championship (2013)
- Sidvin Indian National Motorcycle Racing Championship - INMRC (2014)
- MRF International Cup (2015)
- MECO Endurance Cup (2016)
- Malaysia Super Series FOS Cup (2017)

== WTR-Ten10 ==
The Ten10 Racing Team joined with the WTR Team to enter the Grand Prix motorcycle racing in the 125cc class for the 2011 season.

The joint venture was called WTR-Ten10 Racing Team and it fielded two riders: S. Sarath Kumar and Francesco Mauriello.
