= Ratthapark Wilairot =

Thai motorcycle racer

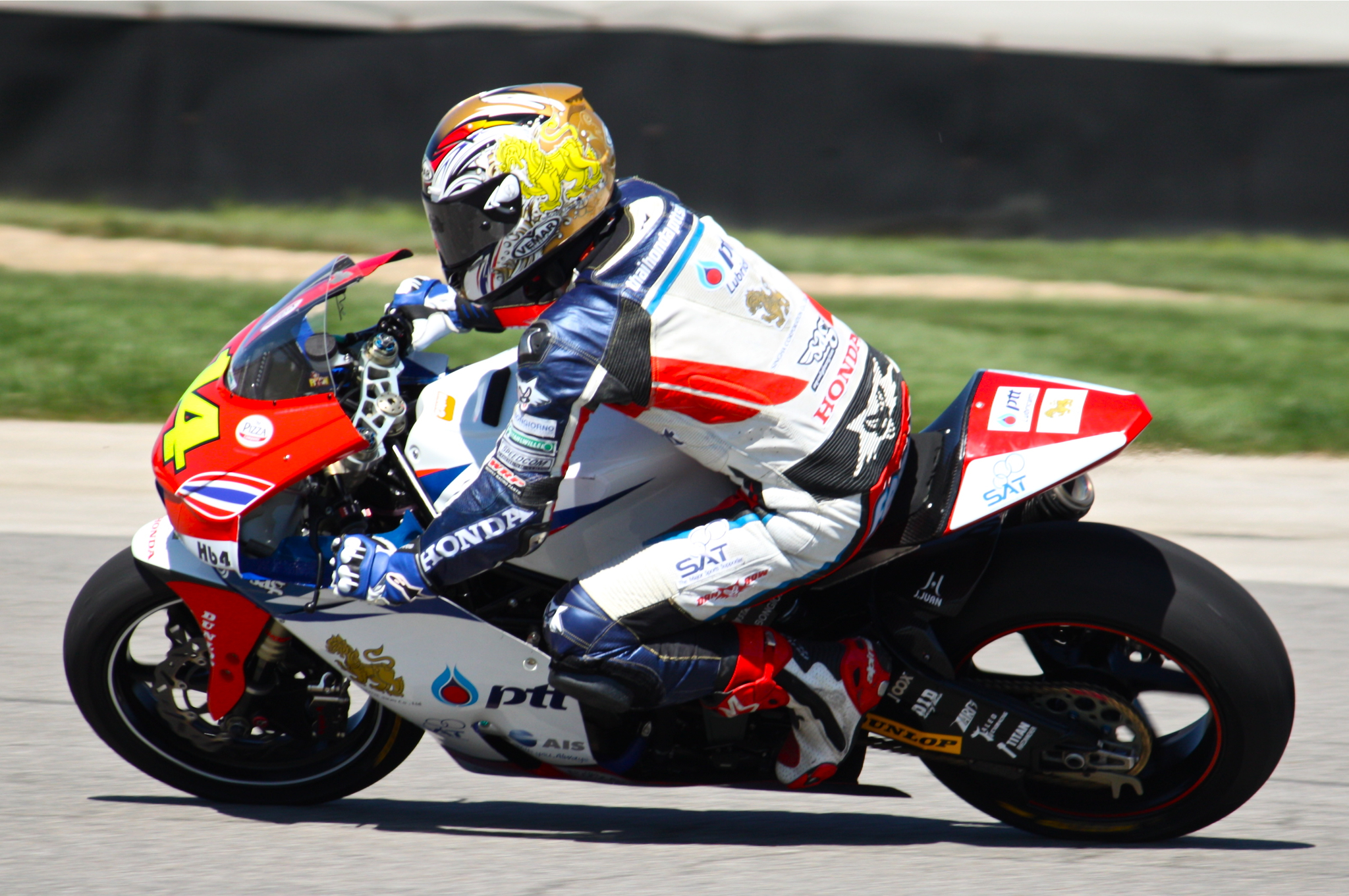
- Wilairot at the 2010 Indianapolis Grand Prix
- Nationality: Thai
- Born: April 14, 1988 (age 38); Ban Bueng Chonburi, Thailand
Motorcycle racing career statistics
Moto2 World Championship
Active years	2010–2016
Manufacturers	Bimota, FTR, Moriwaki, Suter, Caterham Suter, Kalex
Championships	0
2016 championship position	28th (6 pts)
Starts / Wins / Podiums / Poles / F. laps / Points; 84 / 0 / 0 / 0 / 0 / 49
250cc World Championship
Active years	2006–2009
Manufacturers	Honda
Championships	0
2009 championship position	14th (81 pts)
Starts / Wins / Podiums / Poles / F. laps / Points; 49 / 0 / 0 / 0 / 0 / 190
Supersport World Championship
Active years	2015, 2016
Manufacturers	Honda
Championships	0
2015 championship position	13th (46 pts)
Starts / Wins / Podiums / Poles / F. laps / Points; 16 / 1 / 2 / 0 / 0 / 116

Ratthapark Wilairot (Feem) (Thai: รัฐภาคย์ วิไลโรจน์ (ฟิม) (Born April 14, 1988), is a Thai professional motorcycle road racer. Wilairot first competed in Grand Prix racing during the 2006 season's Japanese Grand Prix, and finished a respectable tenth after qualifying in 14th place.

In 2006, he was runner-up in the challenging All Japan GP250 Championship. He joined the 250cc World Championship in 2007 as a member of the Thai Honda PTT-SAG Team, and at the end of the season he was awarded the SAT Athlete of the Year Award. His best finish came at the 2010 Dutch TT where he finished fourth, narrowly missing out on the podium.

== Motorcycle racing career ==
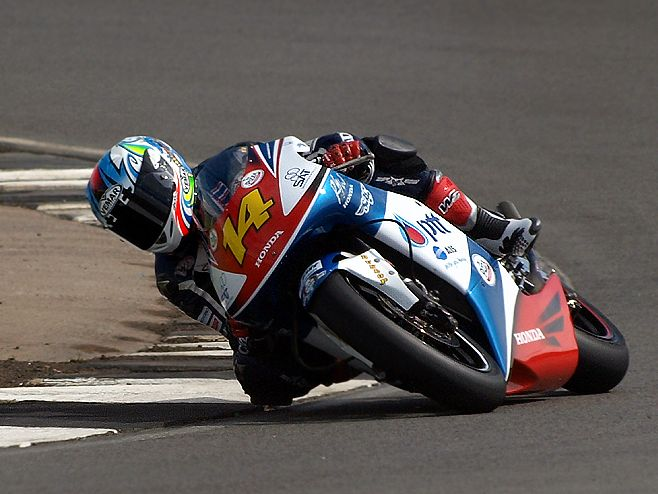
Wilairot at the 2009 British Grand Prix

Born April 14, 1988, in Chonburi Province, Thailand, Wilairot is the eldest son of Thai veteran racer Christmas Wilairot. He began junior road racing at five years old and first won a 50cc motocross trophy at the age of ten. Ratthapark has a younger brother Ratthapong Wilairot (born 1993) who competed in the Asia Road Racing Championship SS600 class, which he won in 2018, and the Supersport World Championship.

Wilairot competed in the Moto2 World Championship, with a best result of fourth at the 2010 Dutch TT. Wilairot had qualified on the front row for the first time, and challenged for the lead with eventual race winner Andrea Iannone. Title challengers Toni Elías and Thomas Lüthi later demoted Wilairot to just off the podium. On 31 July 2013, Wilairot took a sabbatical from racing professionally and became a rider coach for his replacement in the Thai Honda PTT Gresini Moto2 team, Thitipong Warokorn.

On 27 December 2013, Wilairot announced an end to his sabbatical by signing with PTR for the 2014 Supersport World Championship season. He rode a Honda CBR600RR and was sponsored by Core, but would later get fired after making negative comments about the team.

== Career statistics ==
=== Grand Prix motorcycle racing ===
==== By season ====
Season	Class	Motorcycle	Team	Races	Win	Podiums	Pole	Pts	Position
2006	250cc	Honda	Thai Honda Castrol Endurance	1	0	0	0	6	28th
2007	250cc	Honda	Thai Honda PTT SAG	17	0	0	0	30	17th
2008	250cc	Honda	Thai Honda PTT SAG	16	0	0	0	73	13th
2009	250cc	Honda	Thai Honda PTT SAG	15	0	0	0	81	13th
2010	Moto2	Bimota	Thai Honda PTT Singha SAG	17	0	0	0	30	22nd
2011	Moto2	FTR	Thai Honda Singha SAG	14	0	0	0	4	30th
2012	Moto2	Moriwaki	Thai Honda PTT Gresini Moto2	17	0	0	0	9	27th
2012	Moto2	Suter	Thai Honda PTT Gresini Moto2	17	0	0	0	9	27th
2013	Moto2	Suter	Thai Honda PTT Gresini Moto2	8	0	0	0	0	NC
2014	Moto2	Caterham Suter	AirAsia Caterham	7	0	0	0	0	NC
2015	Moto2	Suter	JPMoto Malaysia	4	0	0	0	0	NC
2016	Moto2	Kalex	Idemitsu Honda Team Asia	17	0	0	0	6	28th
Total				**133**	**0**	**0**	**0**	**239**	

==== Races by year ====
(key)

Year	Class	Bike	1	2	3	4	5	6	7	8	9	10	11	12	13	14	15	16	17	18	Pos.	Pts
2006	250cc	Honda	SPA	QAT	TUR	CHN	FRA	ITA	CAT	NED	GBR	GER	USA	CZE	MAL	AUS	JPN; 10	POR	VAL		28th	6
2007	250cc	Honda	QAT; 14	SPA; 12	TUR; 15	CHN; 12	FRA; 11	ITA; Ret	CAT; 17	GBR; 8	NED; 14	GER; 19	CZE; 16	RSM; 13	POR; Ret	JPN; Ret	AUS; 19	MAL; 16	VAL; 15		17th	30
2008	250cc	Honda	QAT; 13	SPA; 12	POR; 13	CHN; 8	FRA; 15	ITA; 10	CAT; 11	GBR; 16	NED; 12	GER; 16	CZE; 11	RSM; 8	INP; C	JPN; 13	AUS; 9	MAL; 8	VAL; 8		13th	73
2009	250cc	Honda	QAT; 8	JPN; Ret	SPA; 15	FRA; 5	ITA; 14	CAT; 7	NED; 9	GER; DNS	GBR; Ret	CZE; 11	INP; Ret	RSM; Ret	POR; 6	AUS; 9	MAL; 6	VAL; 5			13th	81
2010	Moto2	Bimota	QAT; 17	SPA; 17	FRA; 7	ITA; Ret	GBR; 13	NED; 4	CAT; Ret	GER; 17	CZE; 21	INP; Ret	RSM; 12	ARA; 15	JPN; 24	MAL; 16	AUS; 22	POR; Ret	VAL; 22		22nd	30
2011	Moto2	FTR	QAT; Ret	SPA; 12	POR; Ret	FRA; 24	CAT; DNS	GBR; Ret	NED; Ret	ITA; Ret	GER; 25	CZE; 17	INP; Ret	RSM; Ret	ARA; Ret	JPN; 22	AUS; DNS	MAL	VAL; Ret		30th	4
2012	Moto2	Moriwaki	QAT; 21	SPA; 26	POR; 23																27th	9
2012	Moto2	Suter				FRA; 8	CAT; 18	GBR; 15	NED; Ret	GER; Ret	ITA; 16	INP; 23	CZE; 20	RSM; 19	ARA; 24	JPN; 20	MAL; 21	AUS; 18	VAL; 24		27th	9
2013	Moto2	Suter	QAT; Ret	AME; 21	SPA; Ret	FRA; Ret	ITA; 16	CAT; Ret	NED; 20	GER; 22	INP	CZE	GBR	RSM	ARA	MAL	AUS	JPN	VAL		NC	0
2014	Moto2	Caterham Suter	QAT	AME	ARG	SPA; 19	FRA	ITA	CAT	NED	GER	INP	CZE	GBR	RSM; 23	ARA; 22	JPN; 19	AUS; Ret	MAL; Ret	VAL; 19	NC	0
2015	Moto2	Suter	QAT	AME	ARG	SPA	FRA	ITA	CAT; Ret	NED; 24	GER; 23	INP; Ret	CZE	GBR	RSM	ARA	JPN	AUS	MAL	VAL	NC	0
2016	Moto2	Kalex	QAT; 13	ARG; 17	AME; 19	SPA; Ret	FRA; 21	ITA; 22	CAT; Ret	NED	GER; Ret	AUT; 22	CZE; 25	GBR; 18	RSM; 14	ARA; 26	JPN; 18	AUS; 15	MAL; 24	VAL; 20	28th	6

=== Supersport World Championship ===
==== Races by year ====
(key) (Races in bold indicate pole position; races in italics indicate fastest lap)

Year	Bike	1	2	3	4	5	6	7	8	9	10	11	12	Pos.	Pts
2014	Honda	AUS; Ret	SPA; 10	NED; 13	ITA; Ret	GBR; 12	MAL; 6	SMR; 9	POR; 11	SPA; 8	FRA; 9	QAT; 2		9th	70
2015	Honda	AUS; 5	THA; 1	SPA; Ret	NED; 19	ITA; 6	GBR	POR	ITA	MAL	SPA	FRA	QAT	13th	46
