= Danny Webb (motorcyclist) =

British motorcycle racer

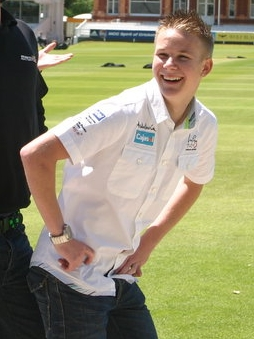
- Webb at a promotional event at Lord's Cricket Ground in 2010.
- Nationality: British
- Born: 22 March 1991 (age 35); Tunbridge Wells, Kent, England
- Current team: WRP Wepol Racing
- Bike number: 99
- Website: dannywebb.com
Motorcycle racing career statistics
Moto3 World Championship
| Active years | 2012–2013, 2016 |
| Manufacturers | Mahindra, Suter Honda |
| Championships | 0 |
| 2016 championship position | 44th (0 pts) |
Starts / Wins / Podiums / Poles / F. laps / Points; 22 / 0 / 0 / 0 / 0 / 15
125cc World Championship
| Active years | 2006–2011 |
| Manufacturers | Honda, Aprilia, Mahindra |
| Championships | 0 |
| 2011 championship position | 19th (24 pts) |
Starts / Wins / Podiums / Poles / F. laps / Points; 80 / 0 / 0 / 1 / 0 / 193.5
Supersport World Championship
| Active years | 2013, 2020 |
| Manufacturers | Honda, Yamaha |
| Championships | 0 |
| 2020 championship position | 11th (80 pts) |
Starts / Wins / Podiums / Poles / F. laps / Points; 19 / 0 / 0 / 0 / 0 / 85

Daniel Webb (born 22 March 1991 in Tunbridge Wells, Kent, England) is a British motorcycle racer. For 2021, he competed in the World Supersport Championship until mid-way through the season, then in the British Supersport Championship as a replacement for injured Kyle Smith.

During 2020, Webb competed in World Supersport for Wepol Racing on a Yamaha R6, after racing in the International Road Race Championship aboard a BMW S1000RR. In 2022 FIM Endurance World Championship, he rode for Polish based Wojcik Racing Team in superstock category.

== Career ==
In 2005, Webb was selected to be part of Dorna's MotoGP Academy project—which included participation in the Spanish 125cc Championship—and was confirmed for 2006.

After entering the 2006 Catalan Grand Prix as a wild-card rider, Webb has competed full-time in the 125cc World Championship for the following five years, starting out in 2007 where he failed to score points in all but one of the races. In 2008, the season started off really well for Webb, claiming a career best fifth position in the third race of the season, however he could not keep this up and fell away towards the end of the season. 2009 was hampered by too many retirements and thus did not improve on his performances from the previous year. In 2010, Webb has been at his most consistent regularly breaking into the top 10 of the championship close to the end of the season. Webb joined Mahindra for 2011 and ended the season in 19th overall. The highlight of the season was a pole position in the final 125cc race, the first pole for Mahindra.

Webb stayed with Mahindra for 2012 but the season in the Moto3 World Championship was a disaster due to an under powered motorcycle and failed to score any points. He started 2013 riding for Ambrogio Racing aboard a Suter Honda but was released by the team mid season due to unsatisfactory results. He then signed for PTR Honda to contest the remaining four rounds of the Supersport World Championship aboard a Honda CBR600RR.

For 2014, Webb signed to ride in the British National Superstock 1000 Championship aboard a Kawasaki ZX-10R for the Moto Breakers team. He left after a few rounds due to poor performances and later joined Collisions Recovery to ride their Kawasaki ZX-6R in the British Supersport Championship, he finished the season in 24th position overall. He remained in the British Supersport class for 2015 but switched teams and motorcycles as he signed for Appleyard / Macadam & Doodson to ride a Yamaha YZF-R6.

=== Isle of Man TT & FIM Endurance Championship ===
Webb started competing for the German squad in 2016 at the Isle of Man TT as well as Macau Grand Prix and further road races. He stayed with the team throughout the seasons of 2017, 2018 and 2019, while he took the championship title in 2018 in the International Road Racing Championship, while also competing in the FIM Endurance World Championship.

== Career statistics ==
=== Grand Prix motorcycle racing ===
==== By season ====
| Season | Class | Motorcycle | Team | Number | Race | Win | Podium | Pole | FLap | Pts | Plcd | WCh |
|---|---|---|---|---|---|---|---|---|---|---|---|---|
| 2006 | 125cc | Honda | Repsol Honda | 39 | 0 | 0 | 0 | 0 | 0 | 0 | NC | 0 |
| 2007 | 125cc | Honda | De Graaf Grand Prix | 99 | 17 | 0 | 0 | 0 | 0 | 3 | 26th | 0 |
| 2008 | 125cc | Aprilia | De Graaf Grand Prix | 99 | 15 | 0 | 0 | 0 | 0 | 35 | 19th | 0 |
| 2009 | 125cc | Aprilia | De Graaf Grand Prix | 99 | 15 | 0 | 0 | 0 | 0 | 38.5 | 17th | 0 |
| 2010 | 125cc | Aprilia | Andalucia Cajasol | 99 | 17 | 0 | 0 | 0 | 0 | 93 | 10th | 0 |
| 2011 | 125cc | Mahindra | Mahindra Racing | 99 | 16 | 0 | 0 | 1 | 0 | 24 | 19th | 0 |
| 2012 | Moto3 | Mahindra | Mahindra Racing | 99 | 14 | 0 | 0 | 0 | 0 | 0 | NC | 0 |
| 2013 | Moto3 | Suter Honda | Ambrogio Racing | 99 | 6 | 0 | 0 | 0 | 0 | 15 | 20th | 0 |
| 2016 | Moto3 | Mahindra | Platinum Bay Real Estate | 22 | 2 | 0 | 0 | 0 | 0 | 0 | 44th | 0 |
| Total | | | | | **102** | **0** | **0** | **1** | **0** | **208.5** | | **0** |

==== By class ====
| Class | Seasons | 1st GP | 1st Pod | 1st Win | Race | Win | Podiums | Pole | FLap | Pts | WChmp |
|---|---|---|---|---|---|---|---|---|---|---|---|
| 125cc | 2006–2011 | 2006 Catalunya | | | 80 | 0 | 0 | 1 | 0 | 193.5 | 0 |
| Moto3 | 2012–2013, 2016 | 2012 Qatar | | | 22 | 0 | 0 | 0 | 0 | 15 | 0 |
| Total | 2006–2013, 2016 | | | | **102** | **0** | **0** | **1** | **0** | **208.5** | **0** |

==== Races by year ====
(key) (Races in bold indicate pole position) (Races in italics indicate fastest lap)

| Year | Class | Bike | 1 | 2 | 3 | 4 | 5 | 6 | 7 | 8 | 9 | 10 | 11 | 12 | 13 | 14 | 15 | 16 | 17 | 18 | Pos | Pts |
|---|---|---|---|---|---|---|---|---|---|---|---|---|---|---|---|---|---|---|---|---|---|---|
| 2006 | 125cc | Honda | SPA | QAT | TUR | CHN | FRA | ITA | CAT; DNQ | NED | GBR | GER | CZE | MAL | AUS | JPN | POR | VAL | | | NC | 0 |
| 2007 | 125cc | Honda | QAT; Ret | SPA; Ret | TUR; 23 | CHN; 23 | FRA; 27 | ITA; 21 | CAT; 26 | GBR; 25 | NED; Ret | GER; 27 | CZE; 28 | RSM; 30 | POR; 20 | JPN; 13 | AUS; Ret | MAL; 22 | VAL; 21 | | 26th | 3 |
| 2008 | 125cc | Aprilia | QAT; 6 | SPA; Ret | POR; 5 | CHN; Ret | FRA; 21 | ITA; Ret | CAT; 11 | GBR; Ret | NED; DNS | GER; Ret | CZE; Ret | RSM; 14 | INP; 15 | JPN; 10 | AUS; DNS | MAL; Ret | VAL; Ret | | 19th | 35 |
| 2009 | 125cc | Aprilia | QAT; 9 | JPN; 11 | SPA; 8 | FRA; Ret | ITA; Ret | CAT; Ret | NED; Ret | GER; 8 | GBR; Ret | CZE; 16 | INP; 11 | RSM; 10 | POR; Ret | AUS; 13 | MAL; Ret | VAL; DNS | | | 17th | 38.5 |
| 2010 | 125cc | Aprilia | QAT; 11 | SPA; Ret | FRA; 9 | ITA; 10 | GBR; 10 | NED; 7 | CAT; 10 | GER; 7 | CZE; Ret | INP; 6 | RSM; 10 | ARA; 9 | JPN; 7 | MAL; Ret | AUS; 10 | POR; 9 | VAL; 16 | | 10th | 93 |
| 2011 | 125cc | Mahindra | QAT; 16 | SPA; Ret | POR; 16 | FRA; Ret | CAT; Ret | GBR; 11 | NED; 13 | ITA; Ret | GER; 14 | CZE; 12 | INP; DNS | RSM; 21 | ARA; 15 | JPN; Ret | AUS; 10 | MAL; 13 | **VAL**; Ret | | 19th | 24 |
| 2012 | Moto3 | Mahindra | QAT; 18 | SPA; Ret | POR; Ret | FRA; Ret | CAT; Ret | GBR; Ret | NED; Ret | GER; 18 | ITA; 20 | INP; DNS | CZE | RSM; Ret | ARA; 25 | JPN; 26 | MAL; Ret | AUS; DNS | VAL; Ret | | NC | 0 |
| 2013 | Moto3 | Suter Honda | QAT; 11 | AME; 11 | SPA; 13 | FRA; DNS | ITA; 17 | CAT; 14 | NED; Ret | GER | INP | CZE | GBR | RSM | ARA | MAL | AUS | JPN | VAL | | 20th | 15 |
| 2016 | Moto3 | Mahindra | QAT | ARG | AME | SPA | FRA | ITA | CAT | NED; 22 | GER; 22 | AUT | CZE | GBR | RSM | ARA | JPN | AUS | MAL | VAL | 44th | 0 |

=== Supersport World Championship ===
==== Races by year ====
(key) (Races in bold indicate pole position) (Races in italics indicate fastest lap)

| Year | Bike | 1 | 2 | 3 | 4 | 5 | 6 | 7 | 8 | 9 | 10 | 11 | 12 | 13 | 14 | 15 | Pos | Pts |
|---|---|---|---|---|---|---|---|---|---|---|---|---|---|---|---|---|---|---|
| 2013 | Honda | AUS | SPA | NED | ITA | GBR | POR | ITA | RUS | GBR | GER; 23 | TUR; 18 | FRA; 17 | SPA; 11 | | | 26th | 5 |
| 2020 | Yamaha | AUS; 10 | SPA; 12 | SPA; 11 | POR; 11 | POR; 22 | SPA; 9 | SPA; 9 | SPA; 8 | SPA; 10 | SPA; 18 | SPA; 9 | FRA; 10 | FRA; 8 | POR; 11 | POR; 10 | 11th | 80 |

| Year | Bike | 1 | 2 | 3 | 4 | 5 | 6 | 7 | 8 | 9 | 10 | 11 | 12 | 13 | 14 | 15 | 16 | 17 | 18 | 19 | 20 | 21 | 22 | 23 | 24 | Pos | Pts |
|---|---|---|---|---|---|---|---|---|---|---|---|---|---|---|---|---|---|---|---|---|---|---|---|---|---|---|---|
| 2021 | Yamaha | SPA; DNS | SPA; DNS | POR | POR | ITA | ITA | NED; Ret | NED; Ret | CZE; Ret | CZE; 20 | SPA | SPA | FRA | FRA | SPA | SPA | SPA | SPA | POR | POR | ARG | ARG | INA | INA | NC | 0 |

=== British Supersport Championship ===
(key) (Races in bold indicate pole position; races in italics indicate fastest lap)

| Year | Bike | 1 | 2 | 3 | 4 | 5 | 6 | 7 | 8 | 9 | 10 | 11 | 12 | 13 | 14 | 15 | 16 | 17 | 18 | 19 | 20 | 21 | 22 | 23 | 24 | Pos | Pts |
|---|---|---|---|---|---|---|---|---|---|---|---|---|---|---|---|---|---|---|---|---|---|---|---|---|---|---|---|
| 2015 | Yamaha | DON; Ret | DON; 10 | BRH; 7 | BRH; 7 | OUL; 8 | OUL; 9 | SNE; 7 | SNE; 4 | KNO; 7 | KNO; 12 | BRH; Ret | BRH; Ret | THR; 9 | THR; 9 | CAD; Ret | CAD; 12 | OUL; 9 | OUL; Ret | ASS; 8 | ASS; 7 | SIL; Ret | SIL; 7 | BRH; 13 | BRH; 9 | 11th | 135 |

== Complete TT record ==
| 2018 | **Superbike TT**; 21 | **Supersport TT**; DNP | **Superstock TT**; 21 | **Supersport TT 2** DNP | **Lightweight TT** | **Senior TT** | **TT Zero**; DNP |
| 2017 | **Superbike TT**; DNP | **Supersport TT**; DNP | **Superstock TT**; DNP | **Supersport TT 2** Cancelled | **Lightweight TT**; DNP | **Senior TT**; DNP | **TT Zero**; DNP |
| 2016 | **Superbike TT**; DNF | **Supersport TT**; DNP | **Superstock TT**; 27 | **Supersport TT 2** DNP | **Lightweight TT**; DNF | **Senior TT**; 26 | **TT Zero**; DNP |
| 2015 | **Superbike TT**; DNP | **Supersport TT**; DNP | **Superstock TT**; DNP | **Supersport TT 2** DNP | **Lightweight TT**; 10 | **Senior TT**; DNP | **TT Zero**; DNP |
| 2014 | **Superbike TT**; 36 | **Supersport TT**; DNP | **Superstock TT**; 37 | **Supersport TT 2** DNP | **Lightweight TT**; 13 | **Senior TT**; 30 | **TT Zero**; DNP |

=== CIV National Superbike ===
==== Races by year ====
(key) (Races in bold indicate pole position; races in italics indicate fastest lap)

| Year | Bike | 1 | | 2 | | 3 | | 4 | | 5 | | 6 | | Pos | Pts |
| Year | Bike | R1 | R2 | R1 | R2 | R1 | R2 | R1 | R2 | R1 | R2 | R1 | R2 | Pos | Pts |
|---|---|---|---|---|---|---|---|---|---|---|---|---|---|---|---|
| 2022 | Suzuki | MIS; 11 | MIS; Ret | VAL | VAL | MUG | MUG | MIS2 | MIS2 | MUG2 | MUG2 | IMO | IMO | 22nd | 5 |

=== FIM Endurance World Championship ===
| Year | Team | Bike | Tyre | Rider | Pts | TC |
|---|---|---|---|---|---|---|
| 2025 | Team LRP Poland | BMW S1000RR | **D** | (United Kingdom) Michael Dunlop (France) Enzo Boulom (United Kingdom) Danny Webb | 6* | 17th* |
