= Francesco Mauriello =

Italian motorcycle racer

- Nationality: Italian
- Born: 28 November 1993 (age 32); Mugnano di Napoli, Italy
Motorcycle racing career statistics
125cc World Championship
Active years	2010–2011
Manufacturers	Aprilia
Championships	0
2011 championship position	NC (0 pts)
Starts / Wins / Podiums / Poles / F. laps / Points; 14 / 0 / 0 / 0 / 0 / 0

Francesco Mauriello (born 28 November 1993) is an Italian motorcycle racer. He won the Italian 125 GP championship in 2010.

== Career statistics ==
=== Grand Prix motorcycle racing ===
==== By season ====
Season	Class	Motorcycle	Team	Race	Win	Podium	Pole	FLap	Pts	Plcd
2010	125cc	Aprilia	Team Semprucci	1	0	0	0	0	0	NC
2011	125cc	Aprilia	WTR-Ten10 Racing	13	0	0	0	0	0	NC
Total				**14**	**0**	**0**	**0**	**0**	**0**	

==== Races by year ====
(key) (Races in bold indicate pole position, races in italics indicate fastest lap)

Year	Class	Bike	1	2	3	4	5	6	7	8	9	10	11	12	13	14	15	16	17	Pos	Pts
2010	125cc	Aprilia	QAT	SPA	FRA	ITA	GBR	NED	CAT	GER	CZE	INP	RSM; 24	ARA	JPN	MAL	AUS	POR	VAL	NC	0
2011	125cc	Aprilia	QAT; 27	SPA; Ret	POR; Ret	FRA; 24	CAT; 20	GBR; Ret	NED; 24	ITA; 21	GER; 22	CZE; 20	INP; 18	RSM; Ret	ARA; Ret	JPN	AUS	MAL	VAL	NC	0

Sporting positions
Preceded by Riccardo Moretti	Italian 125GP champion 2010	Succeeded by Niccolò Antonelli
