= Efrén Vázquez =

Spanish motorcycle racer (born 1986)

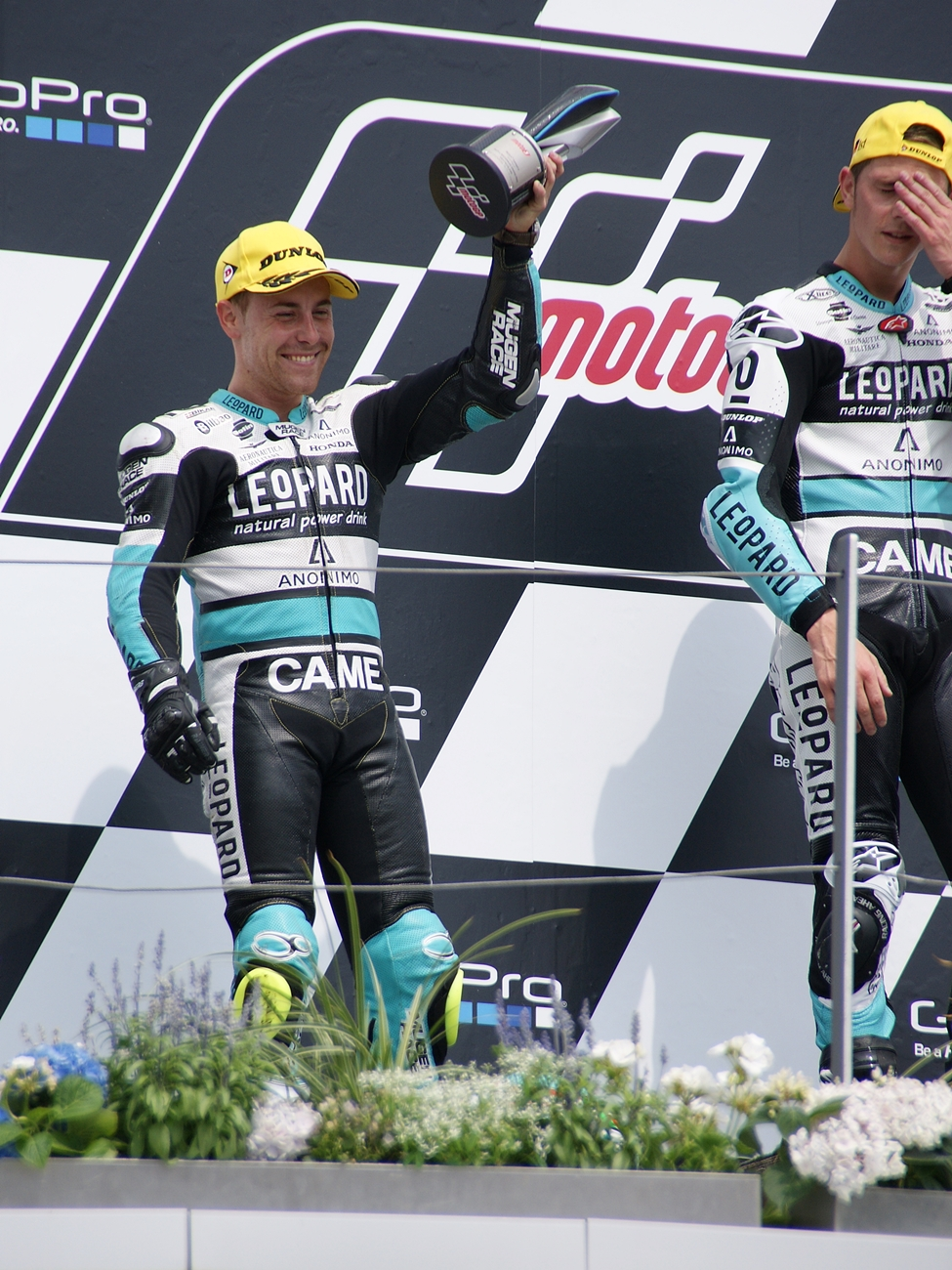
- Vázquez at the 2015 German motorcycle Grand Prix
- Nationality: Spanish
- Born: 2 September 1986 (age 40); Barakaldo, Spain
- Current team: KTM (Test rider)
Motorcycle racing career statistics
Moto2 World Championship
Active years	2016
Manufacturers	Suter
Championships	0
2016 championship position	NC (0 pts)
Starts / Wins / Podiums / Poles / F. laps / Points; 2 / 0 / 0 / 0 / 0 / 0
Moto3 World Championship
Active years	2012–2015
Manufacturers	Honda, FTR Honda, Mahindra
Championships	0
2015 championship position	8th (155 pts)
Starts / Wins / Podiums / Poles / F. laps / Points; 67 / 2 / 12 / 1 / 3 / 552
250cc World Championship
Active years	2007
Manufacturers	Aprilia
Championships	0
2007 championship position	29th (1 pt)
Starts / Wins / Podiums / Poles / F. laps / Points; 10 / 0 / 0 / 0 / 0 / 1
125cc World Championship
Active years	2008–2011
Manufacturers	Aprilia, Derbi
Championships	0
2011 championship position	7th (160 pts)
Starts / Wins / Podiums / Poles / F. laps / Points; 65 / 0 / 4 / 0 / 1 / 397

Efrén Vázquez Rodríguez (born 2 September 1986 in Barakaldo, Spain) is a Spanish road racer of solo motorcycles at Grand Prix level. He was a test rider for KTM's Moto3 project between 2018 and 2024. He has also competed in the 125cc and 250cc world championship classes during his career, and was the 2008 Spanish 125GP Championship winner.

At the 2014 Indianapolis Grand Prix, Vázquez achieved his first Grand Prix victory – in his 116th start – after slipstreaming past Romano Fenati on the final straight, prevailing by 0.065 seconds. He added a second victory later in the season, in Malaysia, en route to fourth in the championship.

== Career statistics ==
=== Grand Prix motorcycle racing ===
==== By season ====
Season	Class	Motorcycle	Team	Race	Win	Podium	Pole	FLap	Pts	Plcd
2007	250cc	Aprilia	Blusens Aprilia Germany	10	0	0	0	0	1	29th
2008	125cc	Aprilia	Blusens Aprilia Junior	15	0	0	0	1	31	20th
2009	125cc	Derbi	Derbi Racing Team	16	0	0	0	0	54	14th
2010	125cc	Derbi	Tuenti Racing	17	0	2	0	0	152	5th
2011	125cc	Derbi	Avant-AirAsia-Ajo	17	0	2	0	0	160	7th
2012	Moto3	Honda	JHK T-shirt Laglisse	16	0	0	0	0	93	10th
2012	Moto3	FTR Honda	JHK T-shirt Laglisse	16	0	0	0	0	93	10th
2013	Moto3	Mahindra	Mahindra Racing	15	0	0	0	0	82	9th
2014	Moto3	Honda	SaxoPrint-RTG	18	2	7	1	2	222	4th
2015	Moto3	Honda	Leopard Racing	18	0	5	0	1	155	8th
2016	Moto2	Suter	JPMoto Malaysia	2	0	0	0	0	0	NC
Total				**144**	**2**	**16**	**1**	**4**	**950**	

==== Races by year ====
(key) (Races in bold indicate pole position; races in italics indicate fastest lap)

Year	Class	Bike	1	2	3	4	5	6	7	8	9	10	11	12	13	14	15	16	17	18	Pos	Pts
2007	250cc	Aprilia	QAT	SPA	TUR	CHN	FRA	ITA	CAT	GBR; 16	NED; 18	GER; Ret	CZE; 15	RSM; 16	POR; Ret	JPN; Ret	AUS; Ret	MAL; Ret	VAL; 18		29th	1
2008	125cc	Aprilia	QAT; 9	SPA; Ret	POR; 15	CHN; 10	FRA; Ret	ITA; 18	CAT; 16	GBR; DNS	NED; Ret	GER; 15	CZE; 18	RSM; 11	INP; 20	JPN; 14	AUS; 11	MAL; DNS	VAL; 12		20th	31
2009	125cc	Derbi	QAT; 17	JPN; 22	SPA; 5	FRA; 8	ITA; Ret	CAT; Ret	NED; 12	GER; 17	GBR; 9	CZE; 14	INP; 21	RSM; 12	POR; Ret	AUS; 7	MAL; Ret	VAL; 7			14th	54
2010	125cc	Derbi	QAT; 2	SPA; Ret	FRA; 4	ITA; 5	GBR; 11	NED; Ret	CAT; 5	GER; 8	CZE; Ret	INP; 4	RSM; 3	ARA; 4	JPN; Ret	MAL; 4	AUS; 4	POR; 8	VAL; 8		5th	152
2011	125cc	Derbi	QAT; 4	SPA; 9	POR; 6	FRA; 3	CAT; 5	GBR; 5	NED; 7	ITA; 4	GER; Ret	CZE; Ret	INP; 6	RSM; 3	ARA; 4	JPN; Ret	AUS; 4	MAL; 11	VAL; 4		7th	160
2012	Moto3	Honda	QAT; 16																		10th	93
2012	Moto3	FTR Honda		SPA; Ret	POR; 5	FRA; DNS	CAT; Ret	GBR; 5	NED; 9	GER; 5	ITA; 6	INP; Ret	CZE; 25	RSM; 7	ARA; 5	JPN; 9	MAL; 8	AUS; 8	VAL; Ret		10th	93
2013	Moto3	Mahindra	QAT; 10	AME; 14	SPA; 8	FRA; DNS	ITA; DNS	CAT; 5	NED; 12	GER; 6	INP; Ret	CZE; 11	GBR; 10	RSM; 12	ARA; 10	MAL; Ret	AUS; 7	JPN; Ret	VAL; 5		9th	82
2014	Moto3	Honda	QAT; 3	AME; 3	ARG; 6	SPA; 2	**FRA**; 6	ITA; 12	CAT; 3	NED; 6	GER; 6	INP; 1	CZE; 8	GBR; Ret	RSM; 10	ARA; 13	JPN; 2	AUS; 4	MAL; 1	VAL; 6	4th	222
2015	Moto3	Honda	QAT; 4	AME; 3	ARG; 2	SPA; 5	FRA; Ret	ITA; Ret	CAT; 3	NED; Ret	GER; 2	INP; Ret	CZE; 4	GBR; 9	RSM; Ret	ARA; 4	JPN; 10	AUS; 2	MAL; Ret	VAL; Ret	8th	155
2016	Moto2	Suter	QAT; 22	ARG; 26	AME; DNS	SPA	FRA	ITA	CAT	NED	GER	AUT	CZE	GBR	RSM	ARA	JPN	AUS	MAL	VAL	NC	0

Sporting positions
Preceded by Stefan Bradl	Spanish 125cc Championship; Champion; 2008	Succeeded by Alberto Moncayo
