= 2011 Portuguese motorcycle Grand Prix =

(Portugal) 2011 Portuguese Grand Prix
Race details
- Race 3 of 18 races in the 2011 Grand Prix motorcycle racing season
- Date: 1 May 2011
- Official name: bwin Grande Prémio de Portugal
- Location: Autódromo do Estoril
- Course: Permanent racing facility; 4.182 km (2.599 mi)

MotoGP
Pole position
Rider	(Spain) Jorge Lorenzo	Yamaha
Time	1:37.161	
Fastest lap
Rider	(Spain) Dani Pedrosa	Honda
Time	1:37.629	
Podium
First	(Spain) Dani Pedrosa	Honda
Second	(Spain) Jorge Lorenzo	Yamaha
Third	(Australia) Casey Stoner	Honda

Moto2
Pole position
Rider	(Germany) Stefan Bradl	Kalex
Time	1:41.591	
Fastest lap
Rider	(Italy) Andrea Iannone	Suter
Time	1:42.026	
Podium
First	(Germany) Stefan Bradl	Kalex
Second	(Spain) Julián Simón	Suter
Third	(Japan) Yuki Takahashi	Moriwaki

125cc
Pole position
Rider	(Spain) Nicolás Terol	Aprilia
Time	1:46.556	
Fastest lap
Rider	(Spain) Nicolás Terol	Aprilia
Time	1:46.815	
Podium
First	(Spain) Nicolás Terol	Aprilia
Second	(Germany) Sandro Cortese	Aprilia
Third	(France) Johann Zarco	Derbi

The 2011 Portuguese motorcycle Grand Prix was the third round of the 2011 Grand Prix motorcycle racing season. It took place on the weekend of 29 April–1 May 2011 at the Autódromo do Estoril located in Estoril, Portugal.

== MotoGP classification ==
Pos.	No.	Rider	Team	Manufacturer	Laps	Time/Retired	Grid	Points
1	26	(Spain) Dani Pedrosa	Repsol Honda Team	Honda	28	45:51.483	3	25
2	1	(Spain) Jorge Lorenzo	Yamaha Factory Racing	Yamaha	28	+3.051	1	20
3	27	(Australia) Casey Stoner	Repsol Honda Team	Honda	28	+7.658	4	16
4	4	(Italy) Andrea Dovizioso	Repsol Honda Team	Honda	28	+16.530	6	13
5	46	(Italy) Valentino Rossi	Ducati Team	Ducati	28	+16.555	9	11
6	5	(United States) Colin Edwards	Monster Yamaha Tech 3	Yamaha	28	+32.575	7	10
7	7	(Japan) Hiroshi Aoyama	San Carlo Honda Gresini	Honda	28	+38.749	11	9
8	35	(United Kingdom) Cal Crutchlow	Monster Yamaha Tech 3	Yamaha	28	+40.912	8	8
9	69	(United States) Nicky Hayden	Ducati Team	Ducati	28	+54.887	13	7
10	14	(France) Randy de Puniet	Pramac Racing Team	Ducati	28	+59.697	16	6
11	24	(Spain) Toni Elías	LCR Honda MotoGP	Honda	28	+1:00.374	17	5
12	65	(Italy) Loris Capirossi	Pramac Racing Team	Ducati	28	+1:01.793	14	4
13	19	(Spain) Álvaro Bautista	Rizla Suzuki MotoGP	Suzuki	28	+1:24.370	15	3
Ret	11	(United States) Ben Spies	Yamaha Factory Racing	Yamaha	12	Accident	5	
Ret	17	(Czech Republic) Karel Abraham	Cardion AB Motoracing	Ducati	1	Accident	12	
Ret	58	(Italy) Marco Simoncelli	San Carlo Honda Gresini	Honda	0	Accident	2	
Ret	8	(Spain) Héctor Barberá	Mapfre Aspar Team MotoGP	Ducati	0	Accident	10	

== Moto2 classification ==
Pos.	No.	Rider	Manufacturer	Laps	Time/Retired	Grid	Points
1	65	(Germany) Stefan Bradl	Kalex	26	44:40.765	1	25
2	60	(Spain) Julián Simón	Suter	26	+0.147	3	20
3	72	(Japan) Yuki Takahashi	Moriwaki	26	+6.188	7	16
4	77	(Switzerland) Dominique Aegerter	Suter	26	+16.822	5	13
5	3	(Italy) Simone Corsi	FTR	26	+17.076	17	11
6	44	(Spain) Pol Espargaró	FTR	26	+25.956	10	10
7	4	(Switzerland) Randy Krummenacher	Kalex	26	+26.102	25	9
8	25	(Italy) Alex Baldolini	Suter	26	+26.333	12	8
9	63	(France) Mike Di Meglio	Tech 3	26	+26.636	26	7
10	34	(Spain) Esteve Rabat	FTR	26	+29.077	23	6
11	71	(Italy) Claudio Corti	Suter	26	+39.637	30	5
12	15	(San Marino) Alex de Angelis	Motobi	26	+39.913	28	4
13	29	(Italy) Andrea Iannone	Suter	26	+42.466	14	3
14	88	(Spain) Ricard Cardús	Moriwaki	26	+47.382	20	2
15	80	(Spain) Axel Pons	Pons Kalex	26	+47.406	16	1
16	35	(Italy) Raffaele De Rosa	Moriwaki	26	+48.025	18	
17	9	(United States) Kenny Noyes	FTR	26	+52.538	27	
18	68	(Colombia) Yonny Hernández	FTR	26	+53.478	33	
19	21	(Spain) Javier Forés	Suter	26	+53.938	31	
20	75	(Italy) Mattia Pasini	FTR	26	+56.089	19	
21	93	(Spain) Marc Márquez	Suter	26	+1:04.697	4	
22	51	(Italy) Michele Pirro	Moriwaki	26	+1:04.890	6	
23	39	(Venezuela) Robertino Pietri	Suter	26	+1:17.101	35	
24	64	(Colombia) Santiago Hernández	FTR	26	+1:18.110	34	
25	45	(United Kingdom) Scott Redding	Suter	26	+1:26.190	13	
26	19	(Belgium) Xavier Siméon	Tech 3	26	+1:27.600	21	
27	13	(Australia) Anthony West	MZ-RE Honda	26	+1:36.540	29	
28	95	(Qatar) Mashel Al Naimi	Moriwaki	25	+1 lap	36	
29	38	(United Kingdom) Bradley Smith	Tech 3	24	+2 laps	15	
Ret	53	(France) Valentin Debise	FTR	23	Accident	32	
Ret	14	(Thailand) Ratthapark Wilairot	FTR	21	Retirement	24	
Ret	36	(Finland) Mika Kallio	Suter	18	Accident	22	
Ret	40	(Spain) Aleix Espargaró	Pons Kalex	18	Retirement	11	
Ret	54	(Turkey) Kenan Sofuoğlu	Suter	17	Retirement	8	
Ret	16	(France) Jules Cluzel	Suter	11	Accident	9	
Ret	97	(South Africa) Steven Odendaal	Suter	7	Retirement	37	
Ret	12	(Switzerland) Thomas Lüthi	Suter	4	Accident	2	
DNS	49	(United Kingdom) Kev Coghlan	FTR		Did not start		
DNS	76	(Germany) Max Neukirchner	MZ-RE Honda		Did not start		
DNQ	99	(Poland) Łukasz Wargala	Moriwaki		Did not qualify		
OFFICIAL MOTO2 REPORT

== 125 cc classification ==
Pos.	No.	Rider	Manufacturer	Laps	Time/Retired	Grid	Points
1	18	(Spain) Nicolás Terol	Aprilia	23	41:21.986	1	25
2	11	(Germany) Sandro Cortese	Aprilia	23	+3.671	2	20
3	5	(France) Johann Zarco	Derbi	23	+4.466	6	16
4	25	(Spain) Maverick Viñales	Aprilia	23	+4.468	11	13
5	94	(Germany) Jonas Folger	Aprilia	23	+12.140	8	11
6	7	(Spain) Efrén Vázquez	Derbi	23	+20.304	9	10
7	44	(Portugal) Miguel Oliveira	Aprilia	23	+25.905	3	9
8	39	(Spain) Luis Salom	Aprilia	23	+46.316	7	8
9	26	(Spain) Adrián Martín	Aprilia	23	+46.395	10	7
10	15	(Italy) Simone Grotzkyj	Aprilia	23	+49.447	14	6
11	63	(Malaysia) Zulfahmi Khairuddin	Derbi	23	+51.071	15	5
12	33	(Spain) Sergio Gadea	Aprilia	23	+1:00.365	12	4
13	84	(Czech Republic) Jakub Kornfeil	Aprilia	23	+1:00.479	16	3
14	31	(Finland) Niklas Ajo	Aprilia	23	+1:11.738	19	2
15	52	(United Kingdom) Danny Kent	Aprilia	23	+1:13.752	23	1
16	99	(United Kingdom) Danny Webb	Mahindra	23	+1:15.357	18	
17	76	(Japan) Hiroki Ono	KTM	23	+1:18.155	21	
18	77	(Germany) Marcel Schrötter	Mahindra	23	+1:27.900	26	
19	30	(Switzerland) Giulian Pedone	Aprilia	23	+1:32.623	24	
20	36	(Spain) Joan Perelló	Aprilia	23	+1:35.088	25	
21	3	(Italy) Luigi Morciano	Aprilia	22	+1 lap	22	
22	86	(Germany) Kevin Hanus	Honda	22	+1 lap	29	
23	56	(Hungary) Péter Sebestyén	KTM	22	+1 lap	27	
24	69	(India) Sarath Kumar	Aprilia	21	+2 laps	30	
Ret	55	(Spain) Héctor Faubel	Aprilia	19	Accident	4	
Ret	21	(United Kingdom) Harry Stafford	Aprilia	18	Retirement	17	
Ret	53	(Netherlands) Jasper Iwema	Aprilia	12	Retirement	20	
Ret	43	(Italy) Francesco Mauriello	Aprilia	8	Retirement	28	
Ret	96	(France) Louis Rossi	Aprilia	6	Accident	13	
Ret	23	(Spain) Alberto Moncayo	Aprilia	4	Retirement	5	
DNS	17	(United Kingdom) Taylor Mackenzie	Aprilia		Did not start		
DNS	19	(Italy) Alessandro Tonucci	Aprilia		Did not start		
OFFICIAL 125CC REPORT

== Championship standings after the race (MotoGP) ==
Below are the standings for the top five riders and constructors after round three has concluded.

Riders' Championship standings

Pos.	Rider	Points
1	(Spain) Jorge Lorenzo	65
2	(Spain) Dani Pedrosa	61
3	(Australia) Casey Stoner	41
4	(Italy) Valentino Rossi	31
5	(United States) Nicky Hayden	30

Constructors' Championship standings

Pos.	Constructor	Points
1	(Japan) Honda	70
2	(Japan) Yamaha	65
3	(Italy) Ducati	36
4	(Japan) Suzuki	9

- Note: Only the top five positions are included for both sets of standings.

Previous race: 2011 Spanish Grand Prix	FIM Grand Prix World Championship; 2011 season	Next race: 2011 French Grand Prix
Previous race: 2010 Portuguese Grand Prix	Portuguese motorcycle Grand Prix	Next race: 2012 Portuguese Grand Prix
