= Alex Baldolini =

Italian motorcycle racer

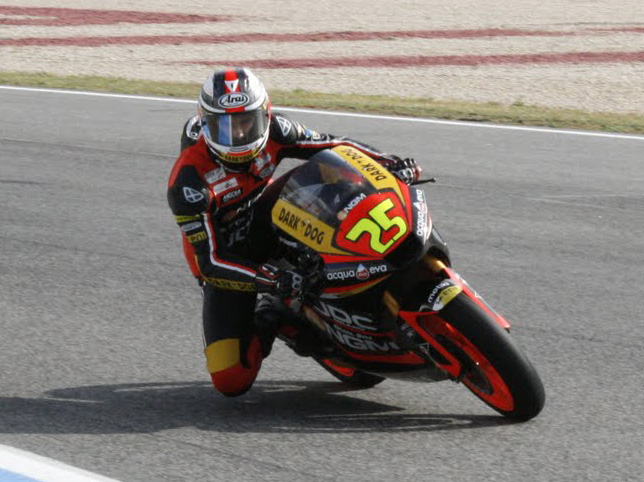
- Baldolini at the 2011 Portuguese Grand Prix
- Nationality: Italian
- Born: 24 January 1985 (age 41); Cesena, Italy
- Current team: Gemar Team Lorini
- Bike number: 19
- Website: alexbaldolini.com
Motorcycle racing career statistics
Moto2 World Championship
Active years	2010–2011
Manufacturers	I.C.P., Suter, Pons Kalex, Moriwaki
2011 championship position	27th (11 pts)
Starts / Wins / Podiums / Poles / F. laps / Points; 31 / 0 / 1 / 0 / 0 / 56
250cc World Championship
Active years	2003–2009
Manufacturers	Aprilia
2009 championship position	16th (41 pts)
Starts / Wins / Podiums / Poles / F. laps / Points; 111 / 0 / 0 / 0 / 1 / 205
125cc World Championship
Active years	2000, 2002
Manufacturers	Honda, Aprilia
2002 championship position	34th (2 pts)
Starts / Wins / Podiums / Poles / F. laps / Points; 16 / 0 / 0 / 0 / 0 / 2
Supersport World Championship
Active years	2012–2018
Manufacturers	Triumph, Honda, Suzuki, MV Agusta, Yamaha
2017 championship position	31st (8 pts)
Starts / Wins / Podiums / Poles / F. laps / Points; 59 / 0 / 1 / 0 / 0 / 286

Alex Baldolini (born 24 January 1985) is an Italian motorcycle racer. He currently competes in the Supersport World Championship aboard a Honda CBR600RR.

== Career statistics ==
=== CIV 125cc Championship ===
==== Races by year ====
(key) (Races in bold indicate pole position; races in italics indicate fastest lap)

Year	Bike	1	2	3	4	5	Pos	Pts
2001	Aprilia	MIS1; 11	MON; 12	VAL; 7	MIS2; 3	MIS3; 8	8th	38

=== Grand Prix motorcycle racing ===
==== Races by year ====
(key)

Year	Class	Bike	1	2	3	4	5	6	7	8	9	10	11	12	13	14	15	16	17	Pos.	Pts
2000	125cc	Honda	RSA	MAL	JPN	SPA	FRA	ITA; 24	CAT	NED	GBR	GER	CZE	POR	VAL	BRA	PAC	AUS		NC	0
2002	125cc	Aprilia	JPN; 14	RSA; 20	SPA; 21	FRA; Ret	ITA; 19	CAT; 20	NED; 21	GBR; 18	GER; 19	CZE; WD	POR; Ret	BRA; Ret	PAC; 26	MAL; 23	AUS; 20	VAL; Ret		34th	2
2003	250cc	Aprilia	JPN; Ret	RSA; 12	SPA; 12	FRA; 13	ITA; Ret	CAT; Ret	NED; 14	GBR; 17	GER; 10	CZE; Ret	POR; 14	BRA; Ret	PAC; 13	MAL; 10	AUS; Ret	VAL; Ret		17th	30
2004	250cc	Aprilia	RSA; Ret	SPA; 11	FRA; 15	ITA; Ret	CAT; 12	NED; 11	BRA; Ret	GER; Ret	GBR; 12	CZE; Ret	POR; Ret	JPN; Ret	QAT; 18	MAL; 11	AUS; Ret	VAL; 10		18th	30
2005	250cc	Aprilia	SPA; 13	POR; Ret	CHN; 13	FRA; 13	ITA; Ret	CAT; 10	NED; Ret	GBR; 13	GER; Ret	CZE; 23	JPN; 14	MAL; Ret	QAT; 20	AUS; Ret	TUR; 11	VAL; 18		18th	25
2006	250cc	Aprilia	SPA; Ret	QAT; Ret	TUR; 8	CHN; 14	FRA; 19	ITA; Ret	CAT; Ret	NED; 11	GBR; 16	GER; 11	CZE; WD	MAL; WD	AUS; 18	JPN; 14	POR; Ret	VAL; 12		16th	26
2007	250cc	Aprilia	QAT; 17	SPA; 13	TUR; 14	CHN; Ret	FRA; 13	ITA; 14	CAT; 18	GBR; 14	NED; 19	GER; 14	CZE; Ret	RSM; Ret	POR; Ret	JPN; Ret	AUS; Ret	MAL; 14	VAL; 14	22nd	18
2008	250cc	Aprilia	QAT; Ret	SPA; 11	POR; 12	CHN; Ret	FRA; 16	ITA; 12	CAT; 13	GBR; Ret	NED; 14	GER; 11	CZE; 15	RSM; Ret	INP; C	JPN; 16	AUS; 12	MAL; 13	VAL; 12	17th	35
2009	250cc	Aprilia	QAT; 15	JPN; Ret	SPA; Ret	FRA; Ret	ITA; 11	CAT; 13	NED; 13	GER; 11	GBR; 16	CZE; Ret	INP; 12	RSM; 13	POR; 14	AUS; Ret	MAL; 9	VAL; 8		16th	41
2010	Moto2	I.C.P.	QAT; 12	SPA; 32	FRA; 14	ITA; 13	GBR; Ret	NED; 16	CAT; Ret	GER; 11	CZE; 17	INP; 16	RSM; Ret	ARA; Ret	JPN; Ret	MAL; 12	AUS; 20	POR; 2	VAL; 17	19th	38
2011	Moto2	Suter	QAT; 28	SPA; Ret	POR; 8	FRA; Ret	CAT; 13	GBR; 14	NED; 11	ITA; Ret	GER; 17	CZE; Ret								27th	18
2011	Moto2	Pons Kalex											INP; 34	RSM; Ret	ARA; 22	JPN	AUS	MAL		27th	18
2011	Moto2	Moriwaki																	VAL; 19	27th	18

=== Supersport World Championship ===
==== Races by year ====
Year	Bike	1	2	3	4	5	6	7	8	9	10	11	12	13	Pos.	Pts
2012	Triumph	AUS; 8	ITA; 11	NED; 5	ITA; 6	EUR; 12	SMR; 3	SPA; Ret	CZE; Ret	GBR; 8	RUS; 11	GER; 5	POR; 8	FRA; 6	7th	96
2013	Honda	AUS; 15	SPA; 11	NED; Ret	ITA; 17										17th	34
2013	Suzuki					GBR; 15	POR; 13	ITA; 9	RUS; C	GBR; 14	GER; 11	TUR; 12	FRA; 10	SPA; Ret	17th	34
2014	MV Agusta	AUS	SPA	NED	ITA; Ret	GBR	MAL	ITA; 19	POR; Ret	SPA					NC	0
2014	Honda										FRA; Ret	QAT			NC	0
2015	MV Agusta	AUS; 7	THA; 9	SPA; 6	NED; 9	ITA; Ret	GBR; Ret	POR; Ret	ITA; 5	MAL; 10	SPA; 7	FRA; DNS	QAT; 8		8th	67
2016	MV Agusta	AUS; 6	THA; 6	SPA; Ret	NED; 5	ITA; 4	MAL; 9	GBR; 7	ITA; 6	GER; 12	FRA; DNS	SPA	QAT; 10		8th	80
2017	MV Agusta	AUS; 13	THA; DNS	SPA	NED	ITA; Ret	GBR; 16	ITA; DNS	GER; Ret	POR; DNS					31st	8
2017	Yamaha										FRA; 14	SPA; Ret	QAT; 13		31st	8
2018	Honda	AUS	THA	SPA	NED	ITA	GBR	CZE; 15	ITA; Ret	POR	FRA	ARG	QAT		31st*	1*

* Season still in progress.
