= 2011 Indianapolis motorcycle Grand Prix =

Motorcycle racing event

2011 Indianapolis Grand Prix
Race details
- Race 12 of 18 races in the 2011 Grand Prix motorcycle racing season
- Date: August 28, 2011
- Official name: Red Bull Indianapolis Grand Prix
- Location: Indianapolis Motor Speedway
- Course: Permanent racing facility; 4.216 km (2.620 mi)

MotoGP
Pole position
- Rider: (Australia) Casey Stoner
- Time: 1:38.850
Fastest lap
- Rider: (Australia) Casey Stoner
- Time: 1:39.807
Podium
- First: (Australia) Casey Stoner
- Second: (Spain) Dani Pedrosa
- Third: (United States) Ben Spies

Moto2
Pole position
- Rider: (Spain) Marc Márquez
- Time: 1:44.038
Fastest lap
- Rider: (Italy) Andrea Iannone
- Time: 1:44.329
Podium
- First: (Spain) Marc Márquez
- Second: (Spain) Pol Espargaró
- Third: (Spain) Esteve Rabat

125cc
Pole position
- Rider: (Spain) Nicolás Terol
- Time: 1:48.199
Fastest lap
- Rider: (Spain) Nicolás Terol
- Time: 1:48.380
Podium
- First: (Spain) Nicolás Terol
- Second: (Spain) Maverick Viñales
- Third: (Germany) Sandro Cortese

The 2011 Indianapolis Grand Prix was the twelfth round of the 2011 Grand Prix motorcycle racing season. It took place on the weekend of August 26–28, 2011 at the Indianapolis Motor Speedway.

The event was held two weeks after the Indiana State Fair stage collapse, which led to the cancellation of the popular AMA Pro flat-track race at the Indiana State Fairgrounds which is held nearby during the Saturday night of the race meet.

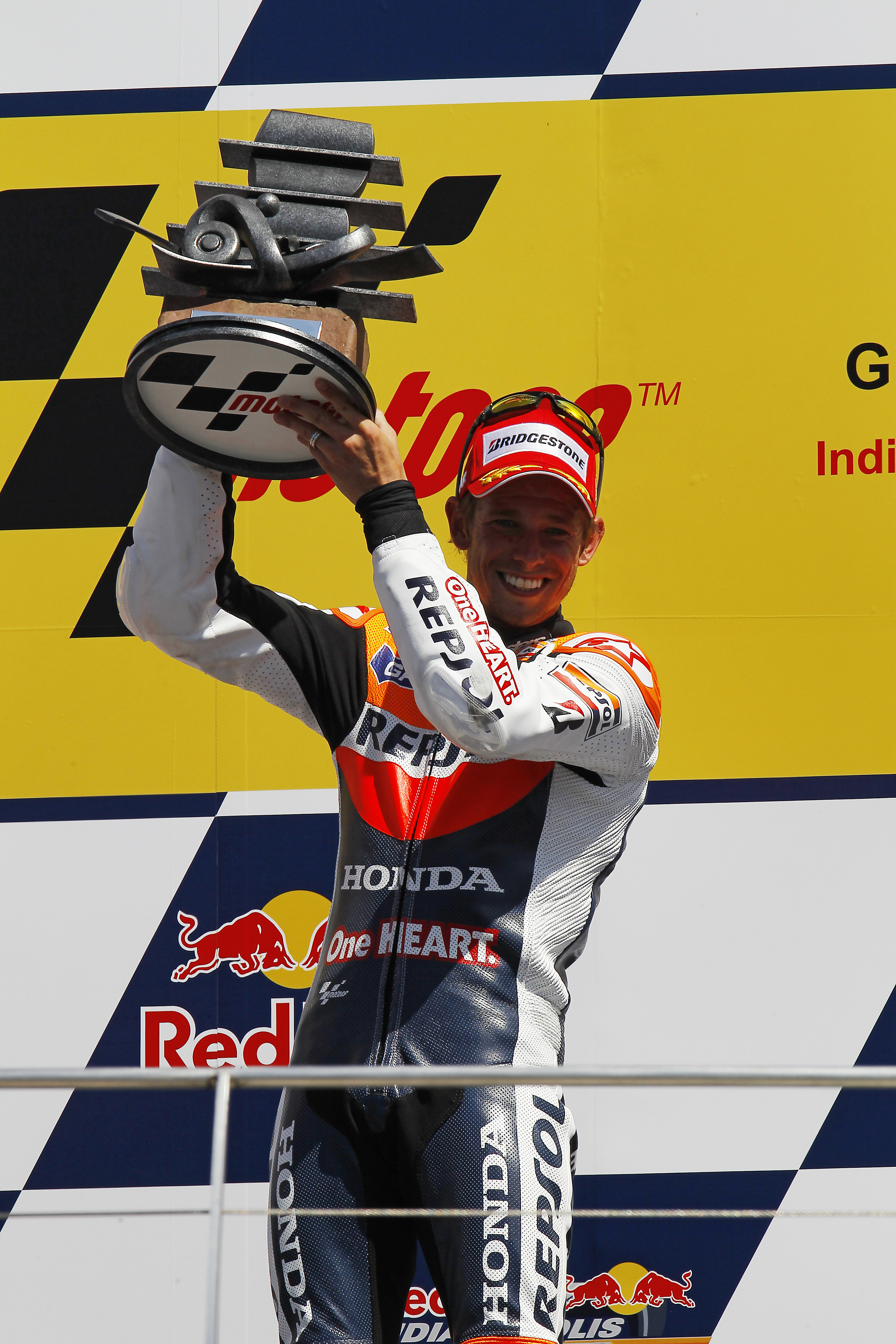
Casey Stoner, lifting his trophy on the podium after winning the MotoGP race.

== MotoGP classification ==
The race took place in the afternoon from 14:00 local time, in dry and partly cloudy weather, with an ambient temperature of 26 °C (80 °F).

Pos.	No.	Rider	Team	Manufacturer	Laps	Time/Retired	Grid	Points
1	27	(Australia) Casey Stoner	Repsol Honda Team	Honda	28	46:52.786	1	25
2	26	(Spain) Dani Pedrosa	Repsol Honda Team	Honda	28	+4.828	4	20
3	11	(United States) Ben Spies	Yamaha Factory Racing	Yamaha	28	+10.603	2	16
4	1	(Spain) Jorge Lorenzo	Yamaha Factory Racing	Yamaha	28	+16.576	3	13
5	4	(Italy) Andrea Dovizioso	Repsol Honda Team	Honda	28	+17.202	5	11
6	19	(Spain) Álvaro Bautista	Rizla Suzuki MotoGP	Suzuki	28	+30.447	9	10
7	5	(United States) Colin Edwards	Monster Yamaha Tech 3	Yamaha	28	+39.690	6	9
8	14	(France) Randy de Puniet	Pramac Racing Team	Ducati	28	+53.416	12	8
9	7	(Japan) Hiroshi Aoyama	San Carlo Honda Gresini	Honda	28	+53.790	13	7
10	46	(Italy) Valentino Rossi	Ducati Team	Ducati	28	+55.345	14	6
11	35	(United Kingdom) Cal Crutchlow	Monster Yamaha Tech 3	Yamaha	28	+57.184	11	5
12	58	(Italy) Marco Simoncelli	San Carlo Honda Gresini	Honda	28	+1:00.141	7	4
13	24	(Spain) Toni Elías	LCR Honda MotoGP	Honda	28	+1:02.169	15	3
14	69	(United States) Nicky Hayden	Ducati Team	Ducati	26	+2 laps	8	2
Ret	8	(Spain) Héctor Barberá	Mapfre Aspar Team MotoGP	Ducati	27	Accident	10	
Ret	17	(Czech Republic) Karel Abraham	Cardion AB Motoracing	Ducati	20	Retirement	16	
Ret	65	(Italy) Loris Capirossi	Pramac Racing Team	Ducati	16	Retirement	17	

== Moto2 classification ==
Pos.	No.	Rider	Manufacturer	Laps	Time/Retired	Grid	Points
1	93	(Spain) Marc Márquez	Suter	26	45:50.601	1	25
2	44	(Spain) Pol Espargaró	FTR	26	+1.889	7	20
3	34	(Spain) Esteve Rabat	FTR	26	+2.310	9	16
4	38	(United Kingdom) Bradley Smith	Tech 3	26	+3.389	4	13
5	45	(United Kingdom) Scott Redding	Suter	26	+5.674	11	11
6	65	(Germany) Stefan Bradl	Kalex	26	+9.134	22	10
7	60	(Spain) Julián Simón	Suter	26	+9.347	15	9
8	75	(Italy) Mattia Pasini	FTR	26	+15.010	6	8
9	36	(Finland) Mika Kallio	Suter	26	+15.031	18	7
10	40	(Spain) Aleix Espargaró	Pons Kalex	26	+15.339	17	6
11	29	(Italy) Andrea Iannone	Suter	26	+17.447	3	5
12	77	(Switzerland) Dominique Aegerter	Suter	26	+21.727	8	4
13	19	(Belgium) Xavier Siméon	Tech 3	26	+24.279	24	3
14	3	(Italy) Simone Corsi	FTR	26	+25.714	2	2
15	15	(San Marino) Alex de Angelis	Motobi	26	+26.894	10	1
16	16	(France) Jules Cluzel	Suter	26	+27.375	12	
17	12	(Switzerland) Thomas Lüthi	Suter	26	+27.546	5	
18	18	(Spain) Jordi Torres	Suter	26	+27.764	21	
19	88	(Spain) Ricard Cardús	Moriwaki	26	+27.946	14	
20	51	(Italy) Michele Pirro	Moriwaki	26	+29.362	13	
21	4	(Switzerland) Randy Krummenacher	Kalex	26	+31.701	23	
22	71	(Italy) Claudio Corti	Suter	26	+32.030	26	
23	35	(Italy) Raffaele De Rosa	Suter	26	+32.100	19	
24	76	(Germany) Max Neukirchner	MZ-RE Honda	26	+35.387	16	
25	72	(Japan) Yuki Takahashi	Moriwaki	26	+37.801	20	
26	13	(Australia) Anthony West	MZ-RE Honda	26	+42.146	30	
27	63	(France) Mike Di Meglio	Tech 3	26	+53.491	25	
28	10	(Colombia) Martín Cárdenas	FTR	26	+58.947	31	
29	73	(United States) J. D. Beach	FTR	26	+1:04.334	35	
30	53	(France) Valentin Debise	FTR	26	+1:12.230	34	
31	32	(United States) Jacob Gagne	FTR	26	+1:12.503	33	
32	39	(Venezuela) Robertino Pietri	Suter	26	+1:15.177	37	
33	64	(Colombia) Santiago Hernández	FTR	26	+1:15.899	38	
34	25	(Italy) Alex Baldolini	Pons Kalex	26	+1:37.102	32	
35	95	(Qatar) Mashel Al Naimi	Moriwaki	25	+1 lap	36	
Ret	14	(Thailand) Ratthapark Wilairot	FTR	21	Accident	27	
Ret	31	(Spain) Carmelo Morales	Moriwaki	15	Retirement	28	
Ret	9	(United States) Kenny Noyes	FTR	7	Retirement	29	
DNS	54	(Turkey) Kenan Sofuoğlu	Suter		Injury		
OFFICIAL MOTO2 REPORT

== 125 cc classification ==
Pos.	No.	Rider	Manufacturer	Laps	Time/Retired	Grid	Points
1	18	(Spain) Nicolás Terol	Aprilia	23	42:11.978	1	25
2	25	(Spain) Maverick Viñales	Aprilia	23	+3.633	4	20
3	11	(Germany) Sandro Cortese	Aprilia	23	+3.737	2	16
4	33	(Spain) Sergio Gadea	Aprilia	23	+4.227	9	13
5	5	(France) Johann Zarco	Derbi	23	+14.186	3	11
6	7	(Spain) Efrén Vázquez	Derbi	23	+14.200	7	10
7	55	(Spain) Héctor Faubel	Aprilia	23	+18.477	6	9
8	44	(Portugal) Miguel Oliveira	Aprilia	23	+23.992	11	8
9	94	(Germany) Jonas Folger	Aprilia	23	+24.239	8	7
10	84	(Czech Republic) Jakub Kornfeil	Aprilia	23	+38.748	12	6
11	15	(Italy) Simone Grotzkyj	Aprilia	23	+39.194	13	5
12	96	(France) Louis Rossi	Aprilia	23	+40.203	18	4
13	52	(United Kingdom) Danny Kent	Aprilia	23	+44.088	5	3
14	10	(France) Alexis Masbou	KTM	23	+45.201	10	2
15	3	(Italy) Luigi Morciano	Aprilia	23	+46.037	16	1
16	53	(Netherlands) Jasper Iwema	Aprilia	23	+58.451	23	
17	14	(South Africa) Brad Binder	Aprilia	23	+1:12.015	26	
18	43	(Italy) Francesco Mauriello	Aprilia	23	+1:12.898	21	
19	63	(Malaysia) Zulfahmi Khairuddin	Derbi	23	+1:14.294	19	
20	36	(Spain) Joan Perelló	Aprilia	23	+1:23.947	25	
21	17	(United Kingdom) Taylor Mackenzie	Aprilia	23	+1:29.369	20	
22	56	(Hungary) Péter Sebestyén	KTM	23	+1:29.813	28	
23	19	(Italy) Alessandro Tonucci	Aprilia	23	+1:34.296	24	
24	30	(Switzerland) Giulian Pedone	Aprilia	21	+2 laps	27	
Ret	77	(Germany) Marcel Schrötter	Mahindra	22	Accident	17	
Ret	26	(Spain) Adrián Martín	Aprilia	20	Retirement	14	
Ret	50	(Norway) Sturla Fagerhaug	Aprilia	11	Accident	22	
Ret	31	(Finland) Niklas Ajo	Aprilia	7	Accident	15	
Ret	21	(United Kingdom) Harry Stafford	Aprilia	7	Retirement	29	
DNS	99	(United Kingdom) Danny Webb	Mahindra		Did not start		
DNS	23	(Spain) Alberto Moncayo	Aprilia		Did not start		
OFFICIAL 125cc REPORT

== Championship standings after the race (MotoGP) ==
Below are the standings for the top five riders and constructors after round twelve has concluded.

Riders' Championship standings

Pos.	Rider	Points
1	(Australia) Casey Stoner	243
2	(Spain) Jorge Lorenzo	199
3	(Italy) Andrea Dovizioso	174
4	(Spain) Dani Pedrosa	130
5	(United States) Ben Spies	125

Constructors' Championship standings

Pos.	Constructor	Points
1	(Japan) Honda	285
2	(Japan) Yamaha	233
3	(Italy) Ducati	135
4	(Japan) Suzuki	55

- Note: Only the top five positions are included for both sets of standings.

Previous race: 2011 Czech Republic Grand Prix	FIM Grand Prix World Championship; 2011 season	Next race: 2011 San Marino Grand Prix
Previous race: 2010 Indianapolis Grand Prix	Indianapolis motorcycle Grand Prix	Next race: 2012 Indianapolis Grand Prix
