= 2011 French motorcycle Grand Prix =

(France) 2011 French Grand Prix
Race details
- Race 4 of 18 races in the 2011 Grand Prix motorcycle racing season
- Date: 15 May 2011
- Official name: Monster Energy Grand Prix de France
- Location: Bugatti Circuit
- Course: Permanent racing facility; 4.185 km (2.600 mi)

MotoGP
Pole position
Rider	(Australia) Casey Stoner	Honda
Time	1:33.153	
Fastest lap
Rider	(Spain) Dani Pedrosa	Honda
Time	1:33.617	
Podium
First	(Australia) Casey Stoner	Honda
Second	(Italy) Andrea Dovizioso	Honda
Third	(Italy) Valentino Rossi	Ducati

Moto2
Pole position
Rider	(Germany) Stefan Bradl	Kalex
Time	1:38.357	
Fastest lap
Rider	(Spain) Marc Márquez	Suter
Time	1:38.533	
Podium
First	(Spain) Marc Márquez	Suter
Second	(Japan) Yuki Takahashi	Moriwaki
Third	(Germany) Stefan Bradl	Kalex

125cc
Pole position
Rider	(Spain) Nicolás Terol	Aprilia
Time	1:43.578	
Fastest lap
Rider	(Spain) Nicolás Terol	Aprilia
Time	1:44.083	
Podium
First	(Spain) Maverick Viñales	Aprilia
Second	(Spain) Nicolás Terol	Aprilia
Third	(Spain) Efrén Vázquez	Derbi

The 2011 French motorcycle Grand Prix was the fourth round of the 2011 Grand Prix motorcycle racing season. It took place on the weekend of 13–15 May 2011 at the Bugatti Circuit in Le Mans, France.

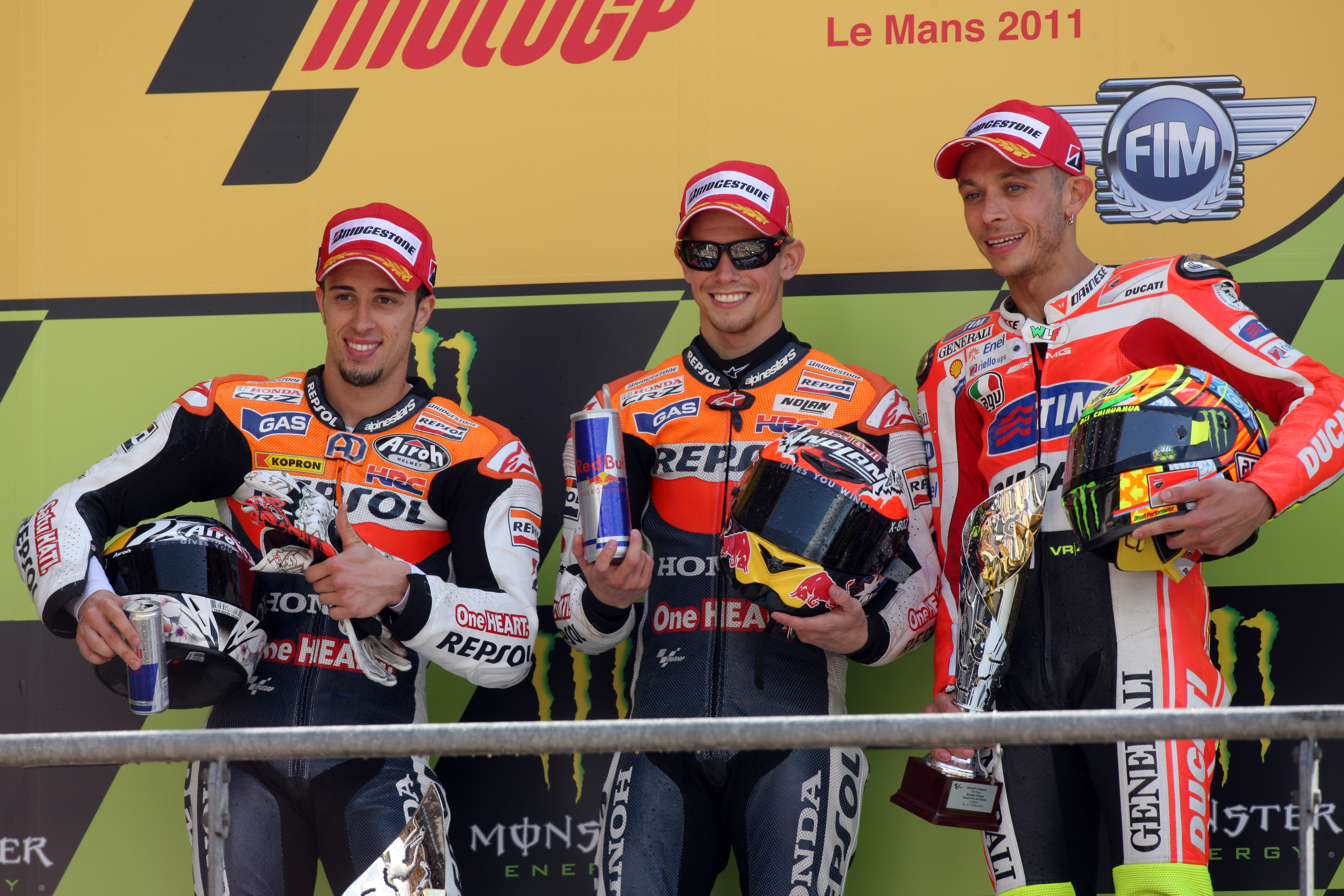
Andrea Dovizioso, Casey Stoner and Valentino Rossi, celebrating on the podium after finishing second, first and third at the MotoGP race.

== MotoGP classification ==
Pos.	No.	Rider	Team	Manufacturer	Laps	Time/Retired	Grid	Points
1	27	(Australia) Casey Stoner	Repsol Honda Team	Honda	28	44:03.955	1	25
2	4	(Italy) Andrea Dovizioso	Repsol Honda Team	Honda	28	+14.214	3	20
3	46	(Italy) Valentino Rossi	Ducati Team	Ducati	28	+14.564	9	16
4	1	(Spain) Jorge Lorenzo	Yamaha Factory Racing	Yamaha	28	+21.075	5	13
5	58	(Italy) Marco Simoncelli	San Carlo Honda Gresini	Honda	28	+31.245	2	11
6	11	(United States) Ben Spies	Yamaha Factory Racing	Yamaha	28	+31.609	8	10
7	69	(United States) Nicky Hayden	Ducati Team	Ducati	28	+35.566	10	9
8	7	(Japan) Hiroshi Aoyama	San Carlo Honda Gresini	Honda	28	+51.502	13	8
9	8	(Spain) Héctor Barberá	Mapfre Aspar Team MotoGP	Ducati	28	+1:03.731	14	7
10	17	(Czech Republic) Karel Abraham	Cardion AB Motoracing	Ducati	28	+1:03.885	16	6
11	24	(Spain) Toni Elías	LCR Honda MotoGP	Honda	28	+1:04.068	17	5
12	19	(Spain) Álvaro Bautista	Rizla Suzuki MotoGP	Suzuki	28	+1:04.192	12	4
13	5	(United States) Colin Edwards	Monster Yamaha Tech 3	Yamaha	26	+2 laps	7	3
Ret	65	(Italy) Loris Capirossi	Pramac Racing Team	Ducati	21	Accident	15	
Ret	26	(Spain) Dani Pedrosa	Repsol Honda Team	Honda	17	Accident	4	
Ret	35	(United Kingdom) Cal Crutchlow	Monster Yamaha Tech 3	Yamaha	6	Retirement	6	
Ret	14	(France) Randy de Puniet	Pramac Racing Team	Ducati	1	Accident	11	

== Moto2 classification ==
Pos.	No.	Rider	Manufacturer	Laps	Time/Retired	Grid	Points
1	93	(Spain) Marc Márquez	Suter	26	43:03.308	6	25
2	72	(Japan) Yuki Takahashi	Moriwaki	26	+1.982	3	20
3	65	(Germany) Stefan Bradl	Kalex	26	+2.237	1	16
4	60	(Spain) Julián Simón	Suter	26	+2.349	9	13
5	12	(Switzerland) Thomas Lüthi	Suter	26	+2.609	2	11
6	40	(Spain) Aleix Espargaró	Pons Kalex	26	+12.295	4	10
7	3	(Italy) Simone Corsi	FTR	26	+18.739	7	9
8	77	(Switzerland) Dominique Aegerter	Suter	26	+18.918	10	8
9	38	(United Kingdom) Bradley Smith	Tech 3	26	+20.408	17	7
10	15	(San Marino) Alex de Angelis	Motobi	26	+20.566	12	6
11	16	(France) Jules Cluzel	Suter	26	+23.225	11	5
12	4	(Switzerland) Randy Krummenacher	Kalex	26	+23.359	16	4
13	44	(Spain) Pol Espargaró	FTR	26	+23.676	19	3
14	51	(Italy) Michele Pirro	Moriwaki	26	+24.756	13	2
15	76	(Germany) Max Neukirchner	MZ-RE Honda	26	+25.063	20	1
16	45	(United Kingdom) Scott Redding	Suter	26	+29.587	5	
17	9	(United States) Kenny Noyes	FTR	26	+32.803	34	
18	19	(Belgium) Xavier Siméon	Tech 3	26	+32.997	31	
19	35	(Italy) Raffaele De Rosa	Moriwaki	26	+33.273	21	
20	68	(Colombia) Yonny Hernández	FTR	26	+34.837	30	
21	34	(Spain) Esteve Rabat	FTR	26	+35.765	22	
22	71	(Italy) Claudio Corti	Suter	26	+41.502	28	
23	75	(Italy) Mattia Pasini	FTR	26	+49.702	15	
24	14	(Thailand) Ratthapark Wilairot	FTR	26	+50.198	18	
25	13	(Australia) Anthony West	MZ-RE Honda	26	+50.789	33	
26	54	(Turkey) Kenan Sofuoğlu	Suter	26	+51.362	25	
27	49	(United Kingdom) Kev Coghlan	FTR	26	+51.471	35	
28	53	(France) Valentin Debise	FTR	26	+1:01.904	37	
29	21	(Spain) Javier Forés	Suter	26	+1:14.039	24	
30	39	(Venezuela) Robertino Pietri	Suter	26	+1:14.338	32	
31	95	(Qatar) Mashel Al Naimi	Moriwaki	26	+1:28.827	39	
32	8	(Australia) Alex Cudlin	Moriwaki	26	+1:29.889	38	
Ret	63	(France) Mike Di Meglio	Tech 3	24	Retirement	27	
Ret	80	(Spain) Axel Pons	Pons Kalex	23	Retirement	14	
Ret	88	(Spain) Ricard Cardús	Moriwaki	19	Retirement	29	
Ret	97	(South Africa) Steven Odendaal	Suter	14	Retirement	40	
Ret	25	(Italy) Alex Baldolini	Suter	11	Retirement	26	
Ret	36	(Finland) Mika Kallio	Suter	4	Retirement	23	
Ret	29	(Italy) Andrea Iannone	Suter	0	Accident	8	
Ret	64	(Colombia) Santiago Hernández	FTR	0	Accident	36	
OFFICIAL MOTO2 REPORT

== 125 cc classification ==
Pos.	No.	Rider	Manufacturer	Laps	Time/Retired	Grid	Points
1	25	(Spain) Maverick Viñales	Aprilia	24	42:00.505	3	25
2	18	(Spain) Nicolás Terol	Aprilia	24	+0.048	1	20
3	7	(Spain) Efrén Vázquez	Derbi	24	+6.836	9	16
4	55	(Spain) Héctor Faubel	Aprilia	24	+8.298	2	13
5	5	(France) Johann Zarco	Derbi	24	+8.590	6	11
6	94	(Germany) Jonas Folger	Aprilia	24	+10.236	5	10
7	11	(Germany) Sandro Cortese	Aprilia	24	+10.667	4	9
8	33	(Spain) Sergio Gadea	Aprilia	24	+15.642	8	8
9	44	(Portugal) Miguel Oliveira	Aprilia	24	+22.838	12	7
10	39	(Spain) Luis Salom	Aprilia	24	+30.901	10	6
11	23	(Spain) Alberto Moncayo	Aprilia	24	+33.796	15	5
12	15	(Italy) Simone Grotzkyj	Aprilia	24	+34.413	11	4
13	96	(France) Louis Rossi	Aprilia	24	+34.696	17	3
14	26	(Spain) Adrián Martín	Aprilia	24	+41.236	7	2
15	10	(France) Alexis Masbou	Aprilia	24	+56.943	19	1
16	76	(Japan) Hiroki Ono	KTM	24	+57.409	23	
17	52	(United Kingdom) Danny Kent	Aprilia	24	+57.763	18	
18	53	(Netherlands) Jasper Iwema	Aprilia	24	+57.823	16	
19	63	(Malaysia) Zulfahmi Khairuddin	Derbi	24	+57.884	13	
20	3	(Italy) Luigi Morciano	Aprilia	24	+1:02.089	21	
21	84	(Czech Republic) Jakub Kornfeil	Aprilia	24	+1:02.713	14	
22	17	(United Kingdom) Taylor Mackenzie	Aprilia	24	+1:25.418	26	
23	30	(Switzerland) Giulian Pedone	Aprilia	24	+1:42.498	28	
24	43	(Italy) Francesco Mauriello	Aprilia	24	+1:43.885	25	
25	56	(Hungary) Péter Sebestyén	KTM	24	+1:44.903	29	
26	19	(Italy) Alessandro Tonucci	Aprilia	24	+1:45.356	31	
27	91	(France) Kévin Szalaï	Aprilia	23	+1 lap	30	
28	92	(France) Kévin Thobois	Honda	23	+1 lap	33	
Ret	36	(Spain) Joan Perelló	Aprilia	20	Retirement	32	
Ret	99	(United Kingdom) Danny Webb	Mahindra	17	Retirement	20	
Ret	77	(Germany) Marcel Schrötter	Mahindra	17	Retirement	24	
Ret	21	(United Kingdom) Harry Stafford	Aprilia	13	Retirement	22	
Ret	31	(Finland) Niklas Ajo	Aprilia	3	Accident	27	
OFFICIAL 125CC REPORT

== Championship standings after the race (MotoGP) ==
Below are the standings for the top five riders and constructors after round four has concluded.

Riders' Championship standings

Pos.	Rider	Points
1	(Spain) Jorge Lorenzo	78
2	(Australia) Casey Stoner	66
3	(Spain) Dani Pedrosa	61
4	(Italy) Andrea Dovizioso	50
5	(Italy) Valentino Rossi	47

Constructors' Championship standings

Pos.	Constructor	Points
1	(Japan) Honda	95
2	(Japan) Yamaha	78
3	(Italy) Ducati	52
4	(Japan) Suzuki	13

- Note: Only the top five positions are included for both sets of standings.

Previous race: 2011 Portuguese Grand Prix	FIM Grand Prix World Championship; 2011 season	Next race: 2011 Catalan Grand Prix
Previous race: 2010 French Grand Prix	French motorcycle Grand Prix	Next race: 2012 French Grand Prix
