= 2011 British motorcycle Grand Prix =

(United Kingdom) 2011 British Grand Prix
Race details
- Race 6 of 18 races in the 2011 Grand Prix motorcycle racing season
- Date: 12 June 2011
- Official name: AirAsia British Grand Prix
- Location: Silverstone Circuit
- Course: Permanent racing facility; 5.902 km (3.667 mi)

MotoGP
Pole position
- Rider: (Australia) Casey Stoner
- Time: 2:02.020
Fastest lap
- Rider: (United States) Nicky Hayden
- Time: 2:21.432
Podium
- First: (Australia) Casey Stoner
- Second: (Italy) Andrea Dovizioso
- Third: (United States) Colin Edwards

Moto2
Pole position
- Rider: (Spain) Marc Márquez
- Time: 2:08.101
Fastest lap
- Rider: (Germany) Stefan Bradl
- Time: 2:25.096
Podium
- First: (Germany) Stefan Bradl
- Second: (United Kingdom) Bradley Smith
- Third: (Italy) Michele Pirro

125cc
Pole position
- Rider: (Spain) Maverick Viñales
- Time: 2:14.684
Fastest lap
- Rider: (Spain) Adrián Martín
- Time: 2:32.946
Podium
- First: (Germany) Jonas Folger
- Second: (France) Johann Zarco
- Third: (Spain) Héctor Faubel

The 2011 British motorcycle Grand Prix was the sixth round of the 2011 Grand Prix motorcycle racing season. It took place on the weekend of 10–12 June 2011 at Silverstone. The race was won by Casey Stoner, who had also taken pole position.

With the new pit and paddock complex built for the Formula One race at Silverstone, the finish line was relocated to the exit of Club instead of Woodcote.

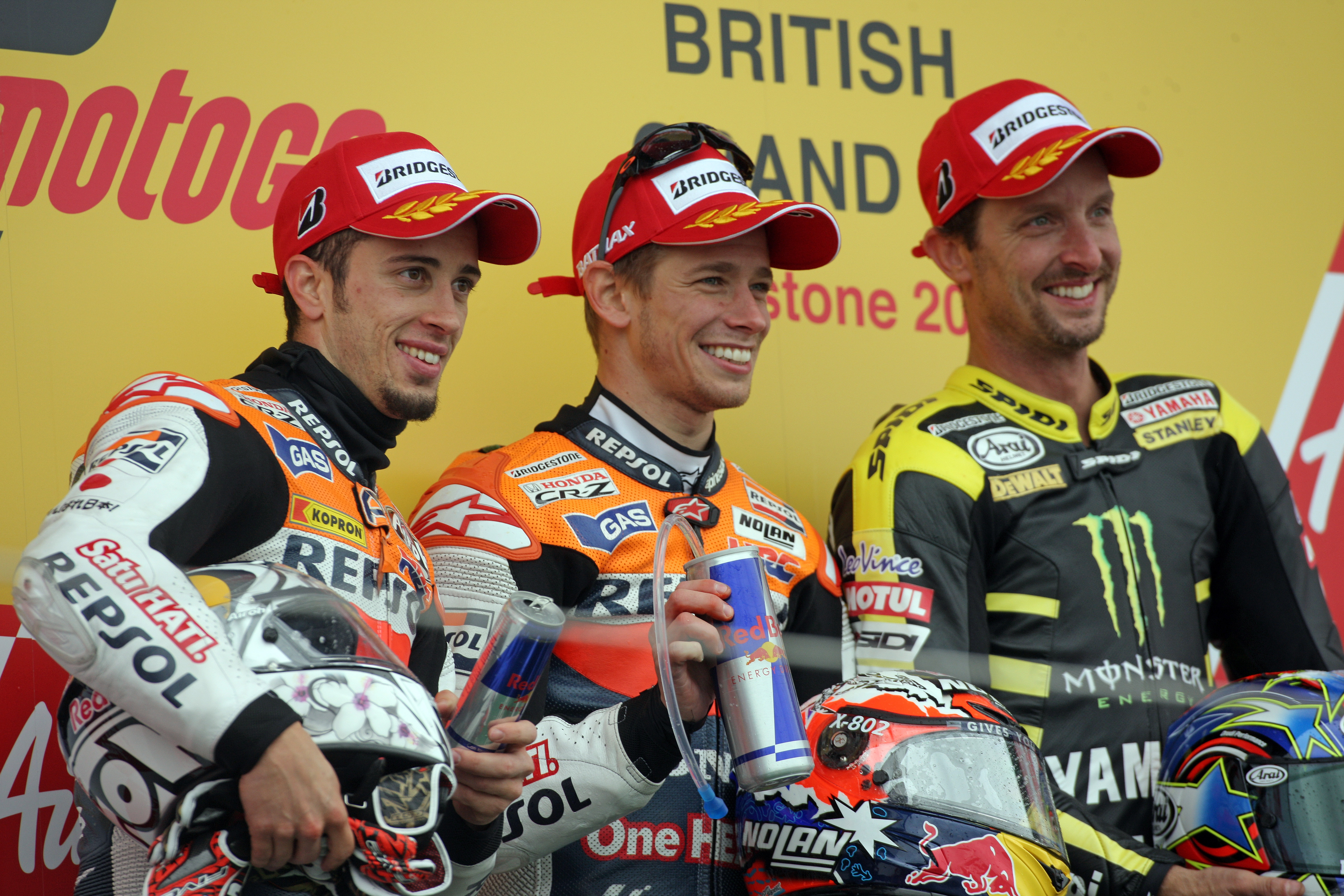
Andrea Dovizioso, Casey Stoner and Colin Edwards, celebrating on the podium after finishing second, first and third in the MotoGP race.

== MotoGP classification ==
Pos.	No.	Rider	Team	Manufacturer	Laps	Time/Retired	Grid	Points
1	27	(Australia) Casey Stoner	Repsol Honda Team	Honda	20	47:53.459	1	25
2	4	(Italy) Andrea Dovizioso	Repsol Honda Team	Honda	20	+15.159	5	20
3	5	(United States) Colin Edwards	Monster Yamaha Tech 3	Yamaha	20	+21.480	8	16
4	69	(United States) Nicky Hayden	Ducati Team	Ducati	20	+26.984	7	13
5	19	(Spain) Álvaro Bautista	Rizla Suzuki MotoGP	Suzuki	20	+35.569	9	11
6	46	(Italy) Valentino Rossi	Ducati Team	Ducati	20	+1:04.526	13	10
7	17	(Czech Republic) Karel Abraham	Cardion AB Motoracing	Ducati	20	+1:32.650	6	9
8	24	(Spain) Toni Elías	LCR Honda MotoGP	Honda	20	+1:51.938	14	8
9	7	(Japan) Hiroshi Aoyama	San Carlo Honda Gresini	Honda	20	+1:52.350	11	7
10	65	(Italy) Loris Capirossi	Pramac Racing Team	Ducati	20	+2:03.312	15	6
11	8	(Spain) Héctor Barberá	Mapfre Aspar Team MotoGP	Ducati	19	+1 lap	12	5
12	14	(France) Randy de Puniet	Pramac Racing Team	Ducati	19	+1 lap	10	4
Ret	58	(Italy) Marco Simoncelli	San Carlo Honda Gresini	Honda	10	Accident	2	
Ret	1	(Spain) Jorge Lorenzo	Yamaha Factory Racing	Yamaha	8	Accident	3	
Ret	11	(United States) Ben Spies	Yamaha Factory Racing	Yamaha	7	Accident	4	
DNS	35	(United Kingdom) Cal Crutchlow	Monster Yamaha Tech 3	Yamaha		Injury		

== Moto2 classification ==
Pos.	No.	Rider	Manufacturer	Laps	Time/Retired	Grid	Points
1	65	(Germany) Stefan Bradl	Kalex	18	44:10.236	3	25
2	38	(United Kingdom) Bradley Smith	Tech 3	18	+7.601	28	20
3	51	(Italy) Michele Pirro	Moriwaki	18	+12.241	6	16
4	16	(France) Jules Cluzel	Suter	18	+17.271	4	13
5	45	(United Kingdom) Scott Redding	Suter	18	+23.531	2	11
6	34	(Spain) Esteve Rabat	FTR	18	+28.661	20	10
7	72	(Japan) Yuki Takahashi	Moriwaki	18	+32.391	12	9
8	54	(Turkey) Kenan Sofuoğlu	Suter	18	+34.662	13	8
9	68	(Colombia) Yonny Hernández	FTR	18	+37.181	21	7
10	3	(Italy) Simone Corsi	FTR	18	+38.981	5	6
11	4	(Switzerland) Randy Krummenacher	Kalex	18	+39.657	8	5
12	76	(Germany) Max Neukirchner	MZ-RE Honda	18	+51.622	17	4
13	49	(United Kingdom) Kev Coghlan	FTR	18	+54.810	24	3
14	25	(Italy) Alex Baldolini	Suter	18	+56.242	34	2
15	12	(Switzerland) Thomas Lüthi	Suter	18	+1:00.769	14	1
16	29	(Italy) Andrea Iannone	Suter	18	+1:06.198	33	
17	63	(France) Mike Di Meglio	Tech 3	18	+1:19.530	9	
18	40	(Spain) Aleix Espargaró	Pons Kalex	18	+1:27.092	7	
19	21	(Spain) Javier Forés	Suter	18	+1:29.849	30	
20	77	(Switzerland) Dominique Aegerter	Suter	18	+1:30.338	31	
21	35	(Italy) Raffaele De Rosa	FTR	18	+1:57.792	15	
22	53	(France) Valentin Debise	FTR	18	+2:11.104	29	
23	39	(Venezuela) Robertino Pietri	Suter	18	+2:29.168	35	
24	95	(Qatar) Mashel Al Naimi	Moriwaki	17	+1 lap	37	
25	96	(Qatar) Nasser Al Malki	Moriwaki	17	+1 lap	38	
Ret	44	(Spain) Pol Espargaró	FTR	16	Accident	23	
Ret	13	(Australia) Anthony West	MZ-RE Honda	14	Retirement	36	
Ret	9	(United States) Kenny Noyes	FTR	14	Retirement	27	
Ret	71	(Italy) Claudio Corti	Suter	13	Retirement	11	
Ret	15	(San Marino) Alex de Angelis	Motobi	11	Retirement	10	
Ret	19	(Belgium) Xavier Siméon	Tech 3	10	Accident	18	
Ret	31	(Spain) Carmelo Morales	Moriwaki	8	Accident	25	
Ret	14	(Thailand) Ratthapark Wilairot	FTR	8	Retirement	32	
Ret	93	(Spain) Marc Márquez	Suter	7	Retirement	1	
Ret	75	(Italy) Mattia Pasini	FTR	6	Accident	22	
Ret	36	(Finland) Mika Kallio	Suter	6	Accident	26	
Ret	18	(Spain) Jordi Torres	Suter	3	Accident	19	
Ret	80	(Spain) Axel Pons	Pons Kalex	0	Accident	16	
OFFICIAL MOTO2 REPORT

== 125 cc classification ==
Pos.	No.	Rider	Manufacturer	Laps	Time/Retired	Grid	Points
1	94	(Germany) Jonas Folger	Aprilia	17	43:48.862	8	25
2	5	(France) Johann Zarco	Derbi	17	+3.885	3	20
3	55	(Spain) Héctor Faubel	Aprilia	17	+14.951	7	16
4	39	(Spain) Luis Salom	Aprilia	17	+17.164	6	13
5	7	(Spain) Efrén Vázquez	Derbi	17	+17.403	4	11
6	26	(Spain) Adrián Martín	Aprilia	17	+19.236	11	10
7	11	(Germany) Sandro Cortese	Aprilia	17	+21.609	5	9
8	18	(Spain) Nicolás Terol	Aprilia	17	+25.167	2	8
9	84	(Czech Republic) Jakub Kornfeil	Aprilia	17	+32.345	16	7
10	52	(United Kingdom) Danny Kent	Aprilia	17	+32.971	12	6
11	99	(United Kingdom) Danny Webb	Mahindra	17	+54.704	15	5
12	17	(United Kingdom) Taylor Mackenzie	Aprilia	17	+1:03.969	26	4
13	96	(France) Louis Rossi	Aprilia	17	+1:35.316	19	3
14	10	(France) Alexis Masbou	KTM	17	+1:43.383	20	2
15	71	(United Kingdom) John McPhee	Aprilia	17	+1:45.973	29	1
16	31	(Finland) Niklas Ajo	Aprilia	17	+1:46.339	21	
17	23	(Spain) Alberto Moncayo	Aprilia	17	+1:52.836	9	
18	63	(Malaysia) Zulfahmi Khairuddin	Derbi	17	+2:25.969	14	
19	36	(Spain) Joan Perelló	Aprilia	17	+2:36.732	28	
20	19	(Italy) Alessandro Tonucci	Aprilia	16	+1 lap	27	
Ret	77	(Germany) Marcel Schrötter	Mahindra	14	Accident	22	
Ret	33	(Spain) Sergio Gadea	Aprilia	12	Accident	10	
Ret	25	(Spain) Maverick Viñales	Aprilia	11	Accident	1	
Ret	56	(Hungary) Péter Sebestyén	KTM	11	Retirement	25	
Ret	30	(Switzerland) Giulian Pedone	Aprilia	11	Accident	24	
Ret	15	(Italy) Simone Grotzkyj	Aprilia	10	Accident	13	
Ret	53	(Netherlands) Jasper Iwema	Aprilia	10	Retirement	18	
Ret	43	(Italy) Francesco Mauriello	Aprilia	6	Retirement	30	
Ret	50	(Norway) Sturla Fagerhaug	Aprilia	0	Accident	17	
DNS	21	(United Kingdom) Harry Stafford	Aprilia	0	Did not start	23	
DNS	3	(Italy) Luigi Morciano	Aprilia		Did not start		
OFFICIAL 125cc REPORT

== Championship standings after the race (MotoGP) ==
Below are the standings for the top five riders and constructors after round six has concluded.

Riders' Championship standings

Pos.	Rider	Points
1	(Australia) Casey Stoner	116
2	(Spain) Jorge Lorenzo	98
3	(Italy) Andrea Dovizioso	83
4	(Italy) Valentino Rossi	68
5	(Spain) Dani Pedrosa	61

Constructors' Championship standings

Pos.	Constructor	Points
1	(Japan) Honda	145
2	(Japan) Yamaha	114
3	(Italy) Ducati	76
4	(Japan) Suzuki	28

- Note: Only the top five positions are included for both sets of standings.

Previous race: 2011 Catalan Grand Prix	FIM Grand Prix World Championship; 2011 season	Next race: 2011 Dutch TT
Previous race: 2010 British Grand Prix	British motorcycle Grand Prix	Next race: 2012 British Grand Prix
