= 2011 Dutch TT =

Motorcycle race

(Netherlands) 2011 Dutch Grand Prix
Race details
- Race 7 of 17 races in the 2011 Grand Prix motorcycle racing season
- Date: 25 June 2011
- Official name: Iveco TT Assen
- Location: TT Circuit Assen
- Course: Permanent racing facility; 4.542 km (2.822 mi)

MotoGP
Pole position
- Rider: (Italy) Marco Simoncelli
- Time: 1:34.718
Fastest lap
- Rider: (United States) Ben Spies
- Time: 1:35.240
Podium
- First: (United States) Ben Spies
- Second: (Australia) Casey Stoner
- Third: (Italy) Andrea Dovizioso

Moto2
Pole position
- Rider: (Germany) Stefan Bradl
- Time: 1:39.305
Fastest lap
- Rider: (Spain) Pol Espargaró
- Time: 1:47.615
Podium
- First: (Spain) Marc Márquez
- Second: (Turkey) Kenan Sofuoğlu
- Third: (United Kingdom) Bradley Smith

125cc
Pole position
- Rider: (Spain) Maverick Viñales
- Time: 1:44.597
Fastest lap
- Rider: (Spain) Maverick Viñales
- Time: 1:44.928
Podium
- First: (Spain) Maverick Viñales
- Second: (Spain) Luis Salom
- Third: (Spain) Sergio Gadea

The 2011 Dutch TT was the seventh round of the 2011 Grand Prix motorcycle racing season. It took place on the weekend of 23–25 June 2011 at the TT Circuit Assen.

== MotoGP race report ==
American rider, Yamaha Factory Racing's Ben Spies, took his first and only victory in the premier class, as well as became the first American to do so since Nicky Hayden won the 2006 United States Motorcycle Grand Prix. This also turned out to be the most recent race won by an American rider in the premier class as of 2026.

== MotoGP classification ==
Pos.	No.	Rider	Team	Manufacturer	Laps	Time/Retired	Grid	Points
1	11	(United States) Ben Spies	Yamaha Factory Racing	Yamaha	26	41:44.659	2	25
2	27	(Australia) Casey Stoner	Repsol Honda Team	Honda	26	+7.697	3	20
3	4	(Italy) Andrea Dovizioso	Repsol Honda Team	Honda	26	+27.506	5	16
4	46	(Italy) Valentino Rossi	Ducati Team	Ducati	26	+30.684	11	13
5	69	(United States) Nicky Hayden	Ducati Team	Ducati	26	+43.172	9	11
6	1	(Spain) Jorge Lorenzo	Yamaha Factory Racing	Yamaha	26	+44.536	4	10
7	5	(United States) Colin Edwards	Monster Yamaha Tech 3	Yamaha	26	+1:08.112	8	9
8	7	(Japan) Hiroshi Aoyama	Repsol Honda Team	Honda	26	+1:10.753	12	8
9	58	(Italy) Marco Simoncelli	San Carlo Honda Gresini	Honda	26	+1:24.925	1	7
10	24	(Spain) Toni Elías	LCR Honda MotoGP	Honda	26	+1:26.216	15	6
11	19	(Spain) Álvaro Bautista	Rizla Suzuki MotoGP	Suzuki	26	+1:38.466	14	5
12	8	(Spain) Héctor Barberá	Mapfre Aspar Team MotoGP	Ducati	25	+1 lap	13	4
13	64	(Japan) Kousuke Akiyoshi	San Carlo Honda Gresini	Honda	25	+1 lap	16	3
14	35	(United Kingdom) Cal Crutchlow	Monster Yamaha Tech 3	Yamaha	24	+2 laps	6	2
Ret	14	(France) Randy de Puniet	Pramac Racing Team	Ducati	1	Accident	10	
Ret	17	(Czech Republic) Karel Abraham	Cardion AB Motoracing	Ducati	0	Accident	7	
DNS	65	(Italy) Loris Capirossi	Pramac Racing Team	Ducati		Injury		

== Moto2 classification ==
Pos.	No.	Rider	Manufacturer	Laps	Time/Retired	Grid	Points
1	93	(Spain) Marc Márquez	Suter	24	44:30.409	2	25
2	54	(Turkey) Kenan Sofuoğlu	Suter	24	+2.397	7	20
3	38	(United Kingdom) Bradley Smith	Tech 3	24	+6.418	10	16
4	13	(Australia) Anthony West	MZ-RE Honda	24	+22.803	20	13
5	15	(San Marino) Alex de Angelis	Motobi	24	+25.882	22	11
6	75	(Italy) Mattia Pasini	FTR	24	+26.851	18	10
7	34	(Spain) Esteve Rabat	FTR	24	+28.125	19	9
8	12	(Switzerland) Thomas Lüthi	Suter	24	+28.712	4	8
9	4	(Switzerland) Randy Krummenacher	Kalex	24	+29.744	17	7
10	76	(Germany) Max Neukirchner	MZ-RE Honda	24	+39.767	39	6
11	25	(Italy) Alex Baldolini	Suter	24	+47.158	28	5
12	29	(Italy) Andrea Iannone	Suter	24	+50.846	25	4
13	68	(Colombia) Yonny Hernández	FTR	24	+57.118	21	3
14	3	(Italy) Simone Corsi	FTR	24	+1:00.775	3	2
15	71	(Italy) Claudio Corti	Suter	24	+1:06.310	15	1
16	40	(Spain) Aleix Espargaró	Pons Kalex	24	+1:06.764	6	
17	51	(Italy) Michele Pirro	Moriwaki	24	+1:06.823	9	
18	77	(Switzerland) Dominique Aegerter	Suter	24	+1:16.296	13	
19	88	(Spain) Ricard Cardús	Moriwaki	24	+1:21.524	31	
20	31	(Spain) Carmelo Morales	Moriwaki	24	+1:22.289	32	
21	49	(United Kingdom) Kev Coghlan	FTR	24	+1:38.161	30	
22	66	(Netherlands) Michael van der Mark	Ten Kate	24	+1:41.888	33	
23	21	(Spain) Javier Forés	Suter	24	+1:42.189	24	
24	45	(United Kingdom) Scott Redding	Suter	23	+1 lap	8	
25	95	(Qatar) Mashel Al Naimi	Moriwaki	23	+1 lap	38	
26	39	(Venezuela) Robertino Pietri	Suter	23	+1 lap	36	
Ret	65	(Germany) Stefan Bradl	Kalex	20	Accident	1	
Ret	97	(South Africa) Steven Odendaal	Suter	20	Accident	37	
Ret	72	(Japan) Yuki Takahashi	Moriwaki	19	Accident	5	
Ret	44	(Spain) Pol Espargaró	FTR	19	Accident	11	
Ret	9	(United States) Kenny Noyes	FTR	19	Accident	26	
Ret	19	(Belgium) Xavier Siméon	Tech 3	18	Accident	14	
Ret	36	(Finland) Mika Kallio	Suter	13	Retirement	16	
Ret	80	(Spain) Axel Pons	Pons Kalex	7	Accident	34	
Ret	14	(Thailand) Ratthapark Wilairot	FTR	5	Accident	27	
Ret	53	(France) Valentin Debise	FTR	5	Accident	35	
Ret	64	(Colombia) Santiago Hernández	FTR	3	Accident	29	
Ret	63	(France) Mike Di Meglio	Tech 3	2	Accident	12	
Ret	16	(France) Jules Cluzel	Suter	2	Accident	23	
DNQ	82	(Spain) Elena Rosell	Suter		Did not qualify		
OFFICIAL MOTO2 REPORT

== 125 cc classification ==
Pos.	No.	Rider	Manufacturer	Laps	Time/Retired	Grid	Points
1	25	(Spain) Maverick Viñales	Aprilia	14	25:04.147	1	25
2	39	(Spain) Luis Salom	Aprilia	14	+2.555	5	20
3	33	(Spain) Sergio Gadea	Aprilia	14	+2.655	8	16
4	11	(Germany) Sandro Cortese	Aprilia	14	+3.670	3	13
5	5	(France) Johann Zarco	Derbi	14	+3.903	2	11
6	52	(United Kingdom) Danny Kent	Aprilia	14	+4.469	9	10
7	7	(Spain) Efrén Vázquez	Derbi	14	+8.828	6	9
8	94	(Germany) Jonas Folger	Aprilia	14	+10.416	7	8
9	77	(Germany) Marcel Schrötter	Mahindra	14	+10.791	13	7
10	55	(Spain) Héctor Faubel	Aprilia	14	+13.238	4	6
11	10	(France) Alexis Masbou	KTM	14	+15.255	15	5
12	15	(Italy) Simone Grotzkyj	Aprilia	14	+16.061	11	4
13	99	(United Kingdom) Danny Webb	Mahindra	14	+25.420	10	3
14	63	(Malaysia) Zulfahmi Khairuddin	Derbi	14	+26.954	35	2
15	23	(Spain) Alberto Moncayo	Aprilia	14	+27.578	19	1
16	84	(Czech Republic) Jakub Kornfeil	Aprilia	14	+27.886	17	
17	3	(Italy) Luigi Morciano	Aprilia	14	+29.450	14	
18	41	(Germany) Luca Grünwald	KTM	14	+32.367	21	
19	30	(Switzerland) Giulian Pedone	Aprilia	14	+33.472	12	
20	56	(Hungary) Péter Sebestyén	KTM	14	+39.819	26	
21	28	(Spain) Josep Rodríguez	Aprilia	14	+40.069	29	
22	51	(Netherlands) Bryan Schouten	Honda	14	+46.619	25	
23	19	(Italy) Alessandro Tonucci	Aprilia	14	+47.645	27	
24	43	(Italy) Francesco Mauriello	Aprilia	14	+47.904	34	
25	21	(United Kingdom) Harry Stafford	Aprilia	14	+48.341	20	
26	17	(United Kingdom) Taylor Mackenzie	Aprilia	14	+1:03.962	24	
27	36	(Spain) Joan Perelló	Aprilia	14	+1:06.347	30	
28	75	(Netherlands) Thomas van Leeuwen	Honda	14	+1:10.403	31	
29	67	(Netherlands) Jerry van de Bunt	Honda	14	+1:22.128	28	
30	96	(France) Louis Rossi	Aprilia	14	+1:23.063	18	
31	50	(Norway) Sturla Fagerhaug	Aprilia	14	+1:25.572	16	
32	61	(Netherlands) Ernst Dubbink	Honda	14	+1:33.434	33	
33	26	(Spain) Adrián Martín	Aprilia	11	+3 laps	22	
Ret	53	(Netherlands) Jasper Iwema	Aprilia	12	Accident	32	
Ret	31	(Finland) Niklas Ajo	Aprilia	3	Retirement	23	
DNS	18	(Spain) Nicolás Terol	Aprilia		Did not start		
OFFICIAL 125cc REPORT

== Championship standings after the race (MotoGP) ==
Below are the standings for the top five riders and constructors after round seven has concluded.

Riders' Championship standings

Pos.	Rider	Points
1	(Australia) Casey Stoner	136
2	(Spain) Jorge Lorenzo	108
3	(Italy) Andrea Dovizioso	99
4	(Italy) Valentino Rossi	81
5	(United States) Nicky Hayden	71

Constructors' Championship standings

Pos.	Constructor	Points
1	(Japan) Honda	165
2	(Japan) Yamaha	139
3	(Italy) Ducati	89
4	(Japan) Suzuki	33

- Note: Only the top five positions are included for both sets of standings.

Previous race: 2011 British Grand Prix	FIM Grand Prix World Championship; 2011 season	Next race: 2011 Italian Grand Prix
Previous race: 2010 Dutch TT	Dutch TT	Next race: 2012 Dutch TT
