= 2011 Catalan motorcycle Grand Prix =

(Catalonia) 2011 Catalan Grand Prix
Race details
- Race 5 of 18 races in the 2011 Grand Prix motorcycle racing season
- Date: 5 June 2011
- Official name: Gran Premi Aperol de Catalunya
- Location: Circuit de Catalunya
- Course: Permanent racing facility; 4.727 km (2.937 mi)

MotoGP
Pole position
- Rider: (Italy) Marco Simoncelli
- Time: 1:42.413
Fastest lap
- Rider: (Australia) Casey Stoner
- Time: 1:43.084
Podium
- First: (Australia) Casey Stoner
- Second: (Spain) Jorge Lorenzo
- Third: (United States) Ben Spies

Moto2
Pole position
- Rider: (Germany) Stefan Bradl
- Time: 1:46.753
Fastest lap
- Rider: (United Kingdom) Bradley Smith
- Time: 1:47.762
Podium
- First: (Germany) Stefan Bradl
- Second: (Spain) Marc Márquez
- Third: (Spain) Aleix Espargaró

125cc
Pole position
- Rider: (Spain) Nicolás Terol
- Time: 1:51.281
Fastest lap
- Rider: (France) Johann Zarco
- Time: 1:52.621
Podium
- First: (Spain) Nicolás Terol
- Second: (Spain) Maverick Viñales
- Third: (Germany) Jonas Folger

The 2011 Catalan motorcycle Grand Prix was the fifth round of the 2011 Grand Prix motorcycle racing season. It took place on the weekend of 3–5 June 2011 at the Circuit de Catalunya. The race, which was won by Casey Stoner, was also notable for being the first pole position for Marco Simoncelli in the premier class.

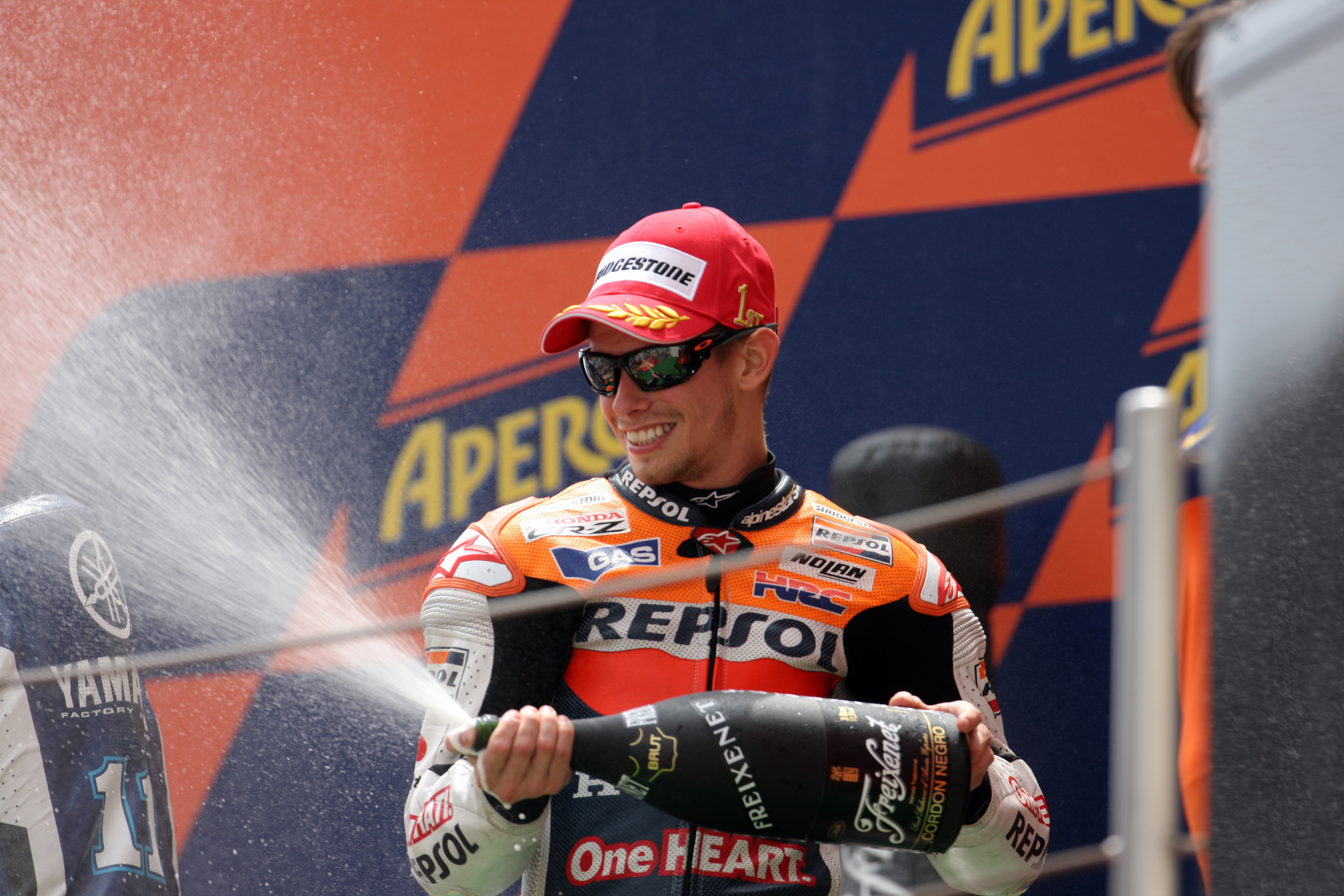
Casey Stoner, spraying the champagne on the podium after winning the MotoGP race.

== MotoGP classification ==
Pos.	No.	Rider	Team	Manufacturer	Laps	Time/Retired	Grid	Points
1	27	(Australia) Casey Stoner	Repsol Honda Team	Honda	25	43:19.779	2	25
2	1	(Spain) Jorge Lorenzo	Yamaha Factory Racing	Yamaha	25	+2.403	3	20
3	11	(United States) Ben Spies	Yamaha Factory Racing	Yamaha	25	+4.291	4	16
4	4	(Italy) Andrea Dovizioso	Repsol Honda Team	Honda	25	+5.255	5	13
5	46	(Italy) Valentino Rossi	Ducati Team	Ducati	25	+7.371	7	11
6	58	(Italy) Marco Simoncelli	San Carlo Honda Gresini	Honda	25	+11.831	1	10
7	35	(United Kingdom) Cal Crutchlow	Monster Yamaha Tech 3	Yamaha	25	+26.483	6	9
8	69	(United States) Nicky Hayden	Ducati Team	Ducati	25	+33.243	8	8
9	65	(Italy) Loris Capirossi	Pramac Racing Team	Ducati	25	+43.092	13	7
10	17	(Czech Republic) Karel Abraham	Cardion AB Motoracing	Ducati	25	+43.113	15	6
11	8	(Spain) Héctor Barberá	Mapfre Aspar Team MotoGP	Ducati	25	+44.224	10	5
12	19	(Spain) Álvaro Bautista	Rizla Suzuki MotoGP	Suzuki	25	+45.239	9	4
13	24	(Spain) Toni Elías	LCR Honda MotoGP	Honda	25	+58.268	14	3
Ret	14	(France) Randy de Puniet	Pramac Racing Team	Ducati	3	Collision	12	
Ret	7	(Japan) Hiroshi Aoyama	San Carlo Honda Gresini	Honda	3	Collision	11	
DNS	5	(United States) Colin Edwards	Monster Yamaha Tech 3	Yamaha		Injury		

== Moto2 classification ==
Pos.	No.	Rider	Manufacturer	Laps	Time/Retired	Grid	Points
1	65	(Germany) Stefan Bradl	Kalex	23	41:38.888	1	25
2	93	(Spain) Marc Márquez	Suter	23	+4.141	5	20
3	40	(Spain) Aleix Espargaró	Pons Kalex	23	+8.409	2	16
4	3	(Italy) Simone Corsi	FTR	23	+10.331	15	13
5	4	(Switzerland) Randy Krummenacher	Kalex	23	+11.661	19	11
6	15	(San Marino) Alex de Angelis	Motobi	23	+12.383	20	10
7	34	(Spain) Esteve Rabat	FTR	23	+12.602	9	9
8	36	(Finland) Mika Kallio	Suter	23	+13.467	7	8
9	68	(Colombia) Yonny Hernández	FTR	23	+16.612	21	7
10	76	(Germany) Max Neukirchner	MZ-RE Honda	23	+16.735	24	6
11	45	(United Kingdom) Scott Redding	Suter	23	+17.031	11	5
12	51	(Italy) Michele Pirro	Moriwaki	23	+18.460	14	4
13	25	(Italy) Alex Baldolini	Suter	23	+22.933	27	3
14	19	(Belgium) Xavier Siméon	Tech 3	23	+23.416	30	2
15	29	(Italy) Andrea Iannone	Suter	23	+23.449	22	1
16	44	(Spain) Pol Espargaró	FTR	23	+24.070	25	
17	71	(Italy) Claudio Corti	Suter	23	+24.111	18	
18	31	(Spain) Carmelo Morales	Moriwaki	23	+25.351	23	
19	38	(United Kingdom) Bradley Smith	Tech 3	23	+29.249	6	
20	53	(France) Valentin Debise	FTR	23	+35.077	26	
21	64	(Colombia) Santiago Hernández	FTR	23	+41.666	34	
22	13	(Australia) Anthony West	MZ-RE Honda	23	+52.103	31	
23	16	(France) Jules Cluzel	Suter	23	+1:02.492	10	
24	49	(United Kingdom) Kev Coghlan	FTR	23	+1:16.294	32	
Ret	80	(Spain) Axel Pons	Pons Kalex	18	Accident	16	
Ret	60	(Spain) Julián Simón	Suter	15	Collision	8	
Ret	54	(Turkey) Kenan Sofuoğlu	Suter	15	Collision	17	
Ret	77	(Switzerland) Dominique Aegerter	Suter	15	Accident	12	
Ret	21	(Spain) Javier Forés	Suter	11	Retirement	13	
Ret	75	(Italy) Mattia Pasini	FTR	7	Accident	33	
Ret	12	(Switzerland) Thomas Lüthi	Suter	5	Collision	4	
Ret	72	(Japan) Yuki Takahashi	Moriwaki	5	Collision	3	
Ret	63	(France) Mike Di Meglio	Tech 3	5	Accident	29	
Ret	39	(Venezuela) Robertino Pietri	Suter	3	Retirement	28	
Ret	95	(Qatar) Mashel Al Naimi	Moriwaki	2	Retirement	36	
Ret	9	(United States) Kenny Noyes	FTR	0	Accident	35	
DNS	14	(Thailand) Ratthapark Wilairot	FTR		Injury		
DNS	88	(Spain) Ricard Cardús	Moriwaki		Injury		
OFFICIAL MOTO2 REPORT

== 125 cc classification ==
Pos.	No.	Rider	Manufacturer	Laps	Time/Retired	Grid	Points
1	18	(Spain) Nicolás Terol	Aprilia	22	42:29.647	1	25
2	25	(Spain) Maverick Viñales	Aprilia	22	+10.356	3	20
3	94	(Germany) Jonas Folger	Aprilia	22	+15.260	7	16
4	11	(Germany) Sandro Cortese	Aprilia	22	+15.670	6	13
5	7	(Spain) Efrén Vázquez	Derbi	22	+15.942	5	11
6	5	(France) Johann Zarco	Derbi	22	+19.758 (Note: Zarco was penalised 20 seconds for an illegal overtake on the last lap in the 125cc race.)	4	10
7	55	(Spain) Héctor Faubel	Aprilia	22	+26.490	2	9
8	33	(Spain) Sergio Gadea	Aprilia	22	+26.681	9	8
9	26	(Spain) Adrián Martín	Aprilia	22	+36.134	10	7
10	84	(Czech Republic) Jakub Kornfeil	Aprilia	22	+36.776	15	6
11	52	(United Kingdom) Danny Kent	Aprilia	22	+37.936	11	5
12	96	(France) Louis Rossi	Aprilia	22	+1:10.840	21	4
13	31	(Finland) Niklas Ajo	Aprilia	22	+1:11.704	23	3
14	10	(France) Alexis Masbou	KTM	22	+1:11.798	17	2
15	23	(Spain) Alberto Moncayo	Aprilia	22	+1:15.709	12	1
16	77	(Germany) Marcel Schrötter	Mahindra	22	+1:22.005	20	
17	53	(Netherlands) Jasper Iwema	Aprilia	22	+1:25.457	13	
18	3	(Italy) Luigi Morciano	Aprilia	22	+1:25.628	22	
19	50	(Norway) Sturla Fagerhaug	Aprilia	22	+1:55.296	29	
20	43	(Italy) Francesco Mauriello	Aprilia	22	+1:55.382	27	
21	30	(Switzerland) Giulian Pedone	Aprilia	22	+1:55.488	28	
22	56	(Hungary) Péter Sebestyén	KTM	21	+1 lap	30	
23	28	(Spain) Josep Rodríguez	Aprilia	21	+1 lap	25	
24	86	(Germany) Kevin Hanus	Honda	21	+1 lap	33	
25	15	(Italy) Simone Grotzkyj	Aprilia	21	+1 lap	18	
26	71	(United Kingdom) John McPhee	Aprilia	20	+2 laps	26	
27	36	(Spain) Joan Perelló	Aprilia	20	+2 laps	31	
28	17	(United Kingdom) Taylor Mackenzie	Aprilia	20	+2 laps	34	
29	19	(Italy) Alessandro Tonucci	Aprilia	20	+2 laps	32	
Ret	39	(Spain) Luis Salom	Aprilia	16	Accident	8	
Ret	99	(United Kingdom) Danny Webb	Mahindra	0	Collision	14	
Ret	44	(Portugal) Miguel Oliveira	Aprilia	0	Collision	16	
Ret	63	(Malaysia) Zulfahmi Khairuddin	Derbi	0	Collision	19	
Ret	21	(United Kingdom) Harry Stafford	Aprilia	0	Collision	24	
OFFICIAL 125cc REPORT

== Championship standings after the race (MotoGP) ==
Below are the standings for the top five riders and constructors after round five has concluded.

Riders' Championship standings

Pos.	Rider	Points
1	(Spain) Jorge Lorenzo	98
2	(Australia) Casey Stoner	91
3	(Italy) Andrea Dovizioso	63
4	(Spain) Dani Pedrosa	61
5	(Italy) Valentino Rossi	58

Constructors' Championship standings

Pos.	Constructor	Points
1	(Japan) Honda	120
2	(Japan) Yamaha	98
3	(Italy) Ducati	63
4	(Japan) Suzuki	17

- Note: Only the top five positions are included for both sets of standings.

Previous race: 2011 French Grand Prix	FIM Grand Prix World Championship; 2011 season	Next race: 2011 British Grand Prix
Previous race: 2010 Catalan Grand Prix	Catalan motorcycle Grand Prix	Next race: 2012 Catalan Grand Prix
