= Ivan Višak =

Croatian motorcycle racer

- Nationality: Croatian
- Born: 14 August 1993 (age 33); Koprivnica, Croatia
- Current team: R2 Motorsport Team / MK Krizevci
- Bike number: 5 / 54

Ivan Višak is a Grand Prix motorcycle racer from Croatia. He currently competes in the European Superstock 600 Championship aboard a Kawasaki ZX-6R and in the Alpe Adria Road Racing Superstock 600 Championship aboard a Yamaha YZF-R6.

In 2009, Višak became the first Croat at a Grand Prix motorcycle race, competing on a wild card.

In December 2012, Višak placed third in the final of the Red Bull Kart Fight, the world's largest amateur kart racing competition, In his second Red Bull Kart Fight final in 2014, Višak again placed third.

== Career statistics ==
2015 - NC, European Superstock 600 Championship #5 Kawasaki ZX-6R

=== Grand Prix motorcycle racing ===
==== By season ====
Season	Class	Motorcycle	Team	Number	Race	Win	Podium	Pole	FLap	Pts	Plcd
2009	125cc	Honda	Team Migomoto	68	1	0	0	0	0	0	NC
Total					**1**	**0**	**0**	**0**	**0**	**0**	

==== Races by year ====
Year	Class	Bike	1	2	3	4	5	6	7	8	9	10	11	12	13	14	15	16	Pos	Points
2009	125cc	Honda	QAT	JPN	SPA	FRA	ITA	CAT	NED	GER	GBR	CZE; 28	INP	RSM	POR	AUS	MAL	VAL	NC	0

=== FIM European Superstock 600 ===
==== Races by year ====
(key) (Races in bold indicate pole position, races in italics indicate fastest lap)

Year	Bike	1	2	3	4	5	6	7	8	Pos	Pts
2015	Kawasaki	SPA	SPA	NED	ITA	POR; 23	ITA; Ret	SPA; 24	FRA; 17	NC	0
