= Gennaro Sabatino =

Italian motorcycle racer

- Nationality: Italian
- Born: 1 January 1993 (age 33); Mugnano di Napoli, Italy
- Current team: Renzi Corse Srl SSD
- Bike number: 74
Motorcycle racing career statistics
125cc World Championship
Active years	2008–2009
Manufacturers	Aprilia
Starts / Wins / Podiums / Poles / F. laps / Points; 2 / 0 / 0 / 0 / 0 / 0

Gennaro Sabatino (born 1 January 1993) is an Italian motorcycle racer. He currently races in the CIV Supersport 600 Championship aboard a Kawasaki ZX-6R.

== Career statistics ==
2014 - 23rd, European Superstock 600 Championship #78 Honda CBR600RR
2015 - NC, European Superstock 600 Championship #74 Kawasaki ZX-6R

=== Grand Prix motorcycle racing ===
==== By season ====
Season	Class	Motorcycle	Team	Number	Race	Win	Podium	Pole	FLap	Pts	Plcd
2008	125cc	Aprilia	Junior GP Racing Dream	49	1	0	0	0	0	0	NC
2009	125cc	Aprilia	Junior GP Racing Dream	63	1	0	0	0	0	0	NC
Total					**2**	**0**	**0**	**0**	**0**	**0**	

==== Races by year ====
Year	Class	Bike	1	2	3	4	5	6	7	8	9	10	11	12	13	14	15	16	17	Pos.	Points
2008	125cc	Aprilia	QAT	SPA	POR	CHN	FRA	ITA	CAT	GBR	NED	GER	CZE	RSM; Ret	INP	JPN	AUS	MAL	VAL	NC	0
2009	125cc	Aprilia	QAT	JPN	SPA	FRA	ITA; 24	CAT	NED	GER	GBR	CZE	INP	RSM	POR	AUS	MAL	VAL		NC	0

=== FIM European Superstock 600 ===
==== Races by year ====
(key) (Races in bold indicate pole position, races in italics indicate fastest lap)

Year	Bike	1	2	3	4	5	6	7	8	Pos	Pts
2014	Yamaha	SPA	NED	IMO	ITA; 5	POR	SPA	FRA		23rd	11
2015	Kawasaki	SPA	SPA	NED	ITA	POR	ITA; Ret	SPA	FRA	NC	0
