= Tatasciore (surname) =

Tatasciore (pronounced [tataʃˈʃoːre]) is an Italian surname from Chieti, Abruzzo. Notable people with the surname include:

- Fred Tatasciore (born 1967), American voice actor
- Manuel Tatasciore (born 1994), Italian motorcycle racer
