= Bryan Schouten =

Dutch motorcycle racer (born 1994)

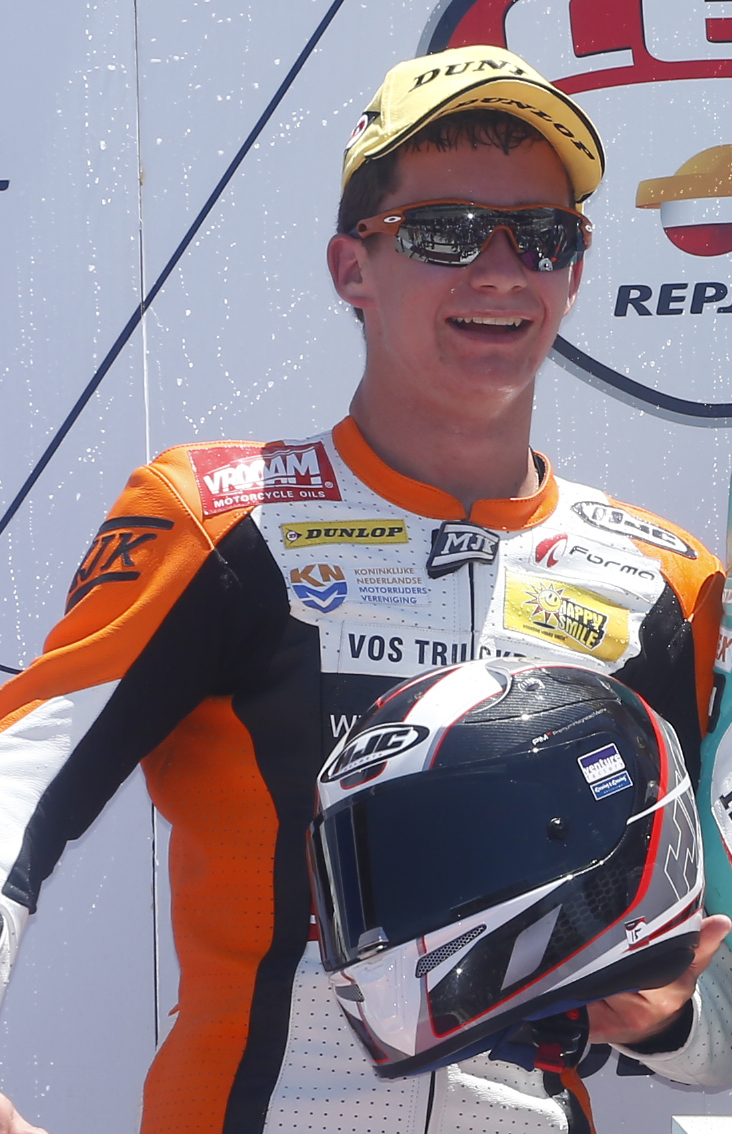
- Schouten in 2013
- Nationality: Dutch
- Born: 10 September 1994 (age 32); Zevenbergen, Netherlands
Motorcycle racing career statistics
Moto3 World Championship
| Active years | 2012–2014 |
| Manufacturers | Honda, FTR Honda, Mahindra |
| Championships | 0 |
| 2014 championship position | NC (0 pts) |
Starts / Wins / Podiums / Poles / F. laps / Points; 15 / 0 / 0 / 0 / 0 / 0
125cc World Championship
| Active years | 2011 |
| Manufacturers | Honda |
| Championships | 0 |
| 2011 championship position | NC (0 pts) |
Starts / Wins / Podiums / Poles / F. laps / Points; 1 / 0 / 0 / 0 / 0 / 0
Supersport World Championship
| Active years | 2016 |
| Manufacturers | Yamaha |
| 2016 championship position | NC (0 pts) |
Starts / Wins / Podiums / Poles / F. laps / Points; 1 / 0 / 0 / 0 / 0 / 0

Bryan Schouten (born 10 September 1994) is a Dutch former motorcycle racer who retired at the end of the 2017 season. Schouten is a former winner of the Dutch ONK 125GP Championship and the Dutch ONK Moto3 Championship, and has also competed in the German IDM 125GP Championship, the German IDM Moto3 Championship, the Spanish CEV Moto3 series and the European Superstock 600 Championship. He won the IDM Superstock 600 Championship in 2016, but even as a champion he could not find the resources to start in 2017. He decided to stop his career, however, less than a week later, Schouten returned to his decision when Ten Kate Racing Products approached him for testing the new Honda CBR-1000RR SP2 and started in the (Dutch) NK SuperCup 1000. After one season, Schouten has decided to start his social career at the age of 23 years. But his dreams are that there will be time and opportunities to help young riders in the future - maybe even on a part-time schedule.

== Career statistics ==
2015 - NC, European Superstock 600 Championship #51 Yamaha YZF-R6

=== FIM CEV Moto3 Championship ===
==== Races by year ====
(key) (Races in bold indicate pole position; races in italics indicate fastest lap)

| Year | Bike | 1 | 2 | 3 | 4 | 5 | 6 | 7 | 8 | 9 | Pos | Pts |
|---|---|---|---|---|---|---|---|---|---|---|---|---|
| 2013 | FTR Honda | CAT1; 6 | CAT2; 2 | ARA; Ret | ALB1; 2 | ALB2; 4 | NAV; 5 | VAL1; 14 | VAL1; 10 | JER; 6 | 7th | 92 |

=== Grand Prix motorcycle racing ===
==== By season ====
| Season | Class | Motorcycle | Team | Race | Win | Podium | Pole | FLap | Pts | Plcd |
|---|---|---|---|---|---|---|---|---|---|---|
| 2011 | 125cc | Honda | Dutch Racing Team | 1 | 0 | 0 | 0 | 0 | 0 | NC |
| 2012 | Moto3 | Honda | Dutch Racing Team | 1 | 0 | 0 | 0 | 0 | 0 | NC |
| 2013 | Moto3 | FTR Honda | Dutch Racing Team | 2 | 0 | 0 | 0 | 0 | 0 | NC |
| 2014 | Moto3 | Mahindra | CIP | 12 | 0 | 0 | 0 | 0 | 0 | NC |
| Total | | | | **16** | **0** | **0** | **0** | **0** | **0** | |

==== Races by year ====
| Year | Class | Bike | 1 | 2 | 3 | 4 | 5 | 6 | 7 | 8 | 9 | 10 | 11 | 12 | 13 | 14 | 15 | 16 | 17 | 18 | Pos. | Pts |
|---|---|---|---|---|---|---|---|---|---|---|---|---|---|---|---|---|---|---|---|---|---|---|
| 2011 | 125cc | Honda | QAT | SPA | POR | FRA | CAT | GBR | NED; 22 | ITA | GER | CZE | INP | RSM | ARA | JPN | AUS | MAL | VAL | | NC | 0 |
| 2012 | Moto3 | Honda | QAT | SPA | POR | FRA | CAT | GBR | NED; 25 | GER | ITA | INP | CZE | RSM | ARA | JPN | MAL | AUS | VAL | | NC | 0 |
| 2013 | Moto3 | FTR Honda | QAT | AME | SPA | FRA | ITA | CAT | NED; 19 | GER | INP | CZE | GBR | RSM | ARA; 19 | MAL | AUS | JPN | VAL | | NC | 0 |
| 2014 | Moto3 | Mahindra | QAT; 25 | AME; 26 | ARG; 18 | SPA; 22 | FRA; 19 | ITA; 21 | CAT; 24 | NED; 16 | GER; Ret | INP; 27 | CZE; 23 | GBR; DNS | RSM; 20 | ARA | JPN | AUS | MAL | VAL | NC | 0 |

=== FIM European Superstock 600 ===
==== Races by year ====
(key) (Races in bold indicate pole position, races in italics indicate fastest lap)

| Year | Bike | 1 | 2 | 3 | 4 | 5 | 6 | 7 | 8 | Pos | Pts |
|---|---|---|---|---|---|---|---|---|---|---|---|
| 2015 | Yamaha | SPA | SPA | NED | ITA | POR; 22 | ITA; 16 | SPA; 16 | FRA; Ret | NC | 0 |

=== Supersport World Championship ===
==== Races by year ====
(key) (Races in bold indicate pole position; races in italics indicate fastest lap)

| Year | Bike | 1 | 2 | 3 | 4 | 5 | 6 | 7 | 8 | 9 | 10 | 11 | 12 | Pos. | Pts |
|---|---|---|---|---|---|---|---|---|---|---|---|---|---|---|---|
| 2016 | Yamaha | AUS | THA | SPA | NED; 17 | ITA | MAL | GBR | ITA | GER | FRA | SPA | QAT | NC | 0 |
