= Pedro Rodríguez (motorcyclist) =

Spanish motorcycle racer

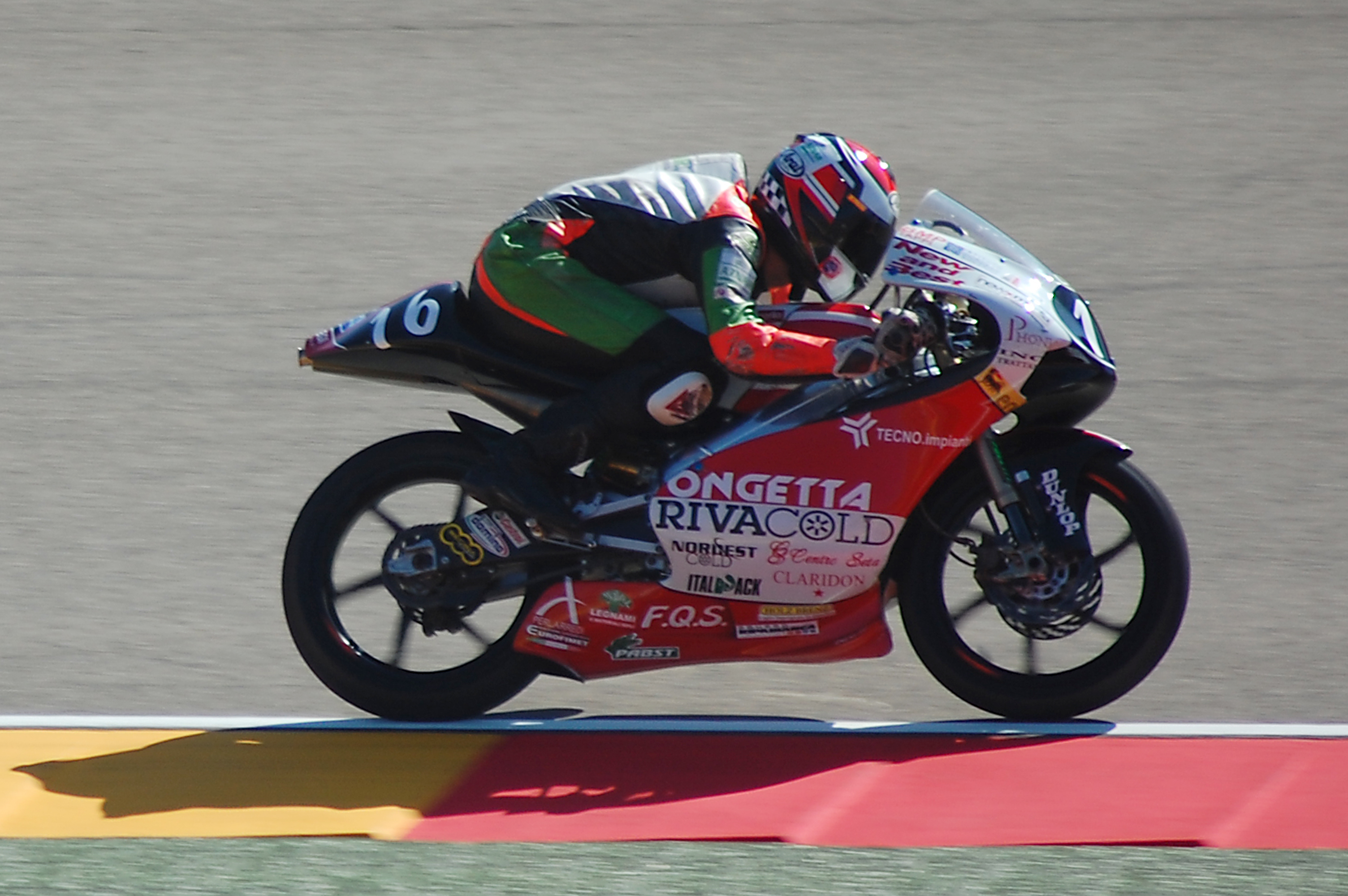
- Rodríguez at the 2010 Aragon Grand Prix
- Nationality: Spanish
- Born: Pedro Rodríguez González; 12 August 1994 (age 32); Zaragoza, Spain
- Current team: Castromaroto Racing Team
- Bike number: 99

Pedro Rodríguez González (born 12 August 1994 in Zaragoza) is a former Spanish Grand Prix motorcycle racer. He currently races in the RFME Superstock 1000 Championship aboard a BMW S1000RR, and has previously competed in the Spanish CEV 125GP Championship, the Spanish Moto3 Championship, the Spanish Moto2 Championship, the European Superstock 600 Championship and the RFME Superstock 600 Championship.

== Career statistics ==
2014 - NC, European Superstock 600 Championship #39 Kawasaki ZX-6R

=== CEV Moto3 Championship ===
==== Races by year ====
(key) (Races in bold indicate pole position, races in italics indicate fastest lap)

Year	Bike	1	2	3	4	5	6	7	Pos	Pts
2012	Honda	JER; 15	NAV; 16	ARA; 17	CAT; 23	ALB1; 17	ALB2; 16	VAL; 20	29th	1

=== European Superstock 600 ===
==== Races by year ====
(key) (Races in bold indicate pole position, races in italics indicate fastest lap)

Year	Bike	1	2	3	4	5	6	7	Pos	Pts
2014	Kawasaki	SPA	NED	IMO	ITA	POR	SPA; 19	FRA; 16	NC	0

=== Grand Prix motorcycle racing ===
==== By season ====
Season	Class	Motorcycle	Team	Number	Race	Win	Podium	Pole	FLap	Pts	Plcd
2010	125cc	Aprilia	Ongetta Team	16	1	0	0	0	0	0	NC
2011	125cc	Aprilia	Turismo de Aragon - DVJ	37	1	0	0	0	0	0	NC
Total					**2**	**0**	**0**	**0**	**0**	**0**	

==== Races by year ====
Year	Class	Bike	1	2	3	4	5	6	7	8	9	10	11	12	13	14	15	16	17	Pos	Points
2010	125cc	Aprilia	QAT	SPA	FRA	ITA	GBR	NED	CAT	GER	CZE	INP	RSM	ARA; Ret	JPN	MAL	AUS	POR	VAL	NC	0
2011	125cc	Aprilia	QAT	SPA	POR	FRA	CAT	GBR	NED	ITA	GER	CZE	INP	RSM	ARA; 20	JPN	AUS	MAL	VAL	NC	0
