= Stirpe =

Stirpe is a surname. Notable people with the surname include:

- Albert A. Stirpe Jr. (born 1953), American politician
- Davide Stirpe (born 1992), Italian motorcycle racer
- Michael Ford (politician) (born Michael Stirpe, 1994), Canadian politician

== See also ==
- Stirpes
