= 2014 European Junior Cup =

2014 European Junior Cup
Previous:	2013	Next:	2015
Support series: Superbike World Championship; Supersport World Championship; FIM Superstock 1000 Cup; European Superstock 600 Championship

The 2014 European Junior Cup was the fourth season of the European Junior Cup. It was contested over eight rounds, starting on 13 April at Motorland Aragón and ending on 5 October at Magny Cours.

Spanish rider Augusto Fernández won the championship, taking four wins during the season, as well as finishing every race in the top six placings. Fernández clinched the championship with a third-place finish in the final race, taking him out of reach of compatriot Javier Orellana, who won the race – his second of the season, after Donington Park – by a tally of fifteen points. Angelo Licciardi completed the top three placings, just a point ahead of another Spanish rider, Illán Fernández. The only other riders to win races during the season were Josh Harland at Jerez and Marc Miralles, who won the opening race at Motorland Aragón.

== Entry list ==
Defending champion Jake Lewis moved to the European Superstock 600 Championship, while the series featured two female riders – Clarissa Miebach of Germany and Carmen Geissler of Switzerland.

No.	Rider	Rounds
3	(United Kingdom) Sam Wilford	7–8
5	(Canada) Braeden Ortt	All
6	(United Kingdom) Ross Patterson	1–2
7	(United States) Alex Wisdom	All
8	(Spain) Mika Pérez	All
10	(Netherlands) Maurice Karsijns	8
11	(Italy) Riccardo Picciuto	5, 7
13	(Mexico) Mario Luján Soto	7
17	(Netherlands) Max van Schoonhoven	All
21	(Australia) Brandon Demmery	8
22	(Netherlands) Ricardo Brink	2
23	(Germany) Clarissa Miebach	All
25	(Sweden) Jesper Hubner	1–6
32	(Portugal) David Ferreira	6–7
34	(United Kingdom) Daniel Drayton	4, 7
35	(United Kingdom) Stefan Hill	All
36	(Italy) Lorenzo Gabellini	3
37	(Spain) Augusto Fernández	All
38	(Estonia) Hannes Soomer	All
41	(Norway) Stinius Viking Ødegård	5
45	(New Zealand) Scout Fletcher	8
46	(Finland) Joona Ylikantola	7
51	(Italy) Matteo Ciprietti	5
52	(Italy) Marco Malone	5
53	(Spain) Illán Fernández	All
54	(Switzerland) Carmen Geissler	1–5, 7–8
55	(South Africa) Troy Bezuidenhout	7–8
58	(France) Maxime Bonnot	8
59	(France) Dorian Laville	8
61	(Spain) Marc Miralles	1–4
62	(Netherlands) Vasco van der Valk	8
68	(France) Gaëtan Gouget	8
69	(Spain) Javier Orellana	All
74	(Netherlands) Jaimie van Sikkelerus	2–8
77	(Spain) Josué Moreno	1–7
80	(Israel) Bar Levy	1–5, 7
83	(Australia) Lachlan Epis	5–8
84	(Italy) Paolo Grassia	1–5
85	(Hungary) Alexander Somosi	5–8
87	(Belgium) Angelo Licciardi	All
88	(China) Jianwen Zhu	1–3
93	(United Kingdom) Joshua Harland	All
99	(New Zealand) Connor London	All

== Race calendar and results ==
Round	Country	Circuit	Date	Pole position	Fastest lap	Winning rider
1	Spain	Motorland Aragón	April 13	(Spain) Mika Pérez	(Estonia) Hannes Soomer	(Spain) Marc Miralles
2	Netherlands	TT Circuit Assen	April 27	(Spain) Marc Miralles	(Netherlands) Ricardo Brink	(Spain) Augusto Fernández
3	Italy	Autodromo Enzo e Dino Ferrari	May 11	(Spain) Javier Orellana	(Spain) Augusto Fernández	(Spain) Augusto Fernández
4	United Kingdom	Donington Park	May 25	(United Kingdom) Joshua Harland	(Spain) Javier Orellana	(Spain) Javier Orellana
5	Italy	Misano Circuit	June 22	(Spain) Javier Orellana	(Spain) Illán Fernández	(Spain) Augusto Fernández
6	Portugal	Algarve International Circuit	July 6	(Spain) Javier Orellana	(Spain) Mika Pérez	(Spain) Augusto Fernández
7	Spain	Circuito de Jerez	September 7	(Spain) Illán Fernández	(United Kingdom) Sam Wilford	(United Kingdom) Joshua Harland
8	France	Circuit de Nevers Magny-Cours	October 5	(France) Dorian Laville	(Netherlands) Jaimie van Sikkelerus	(Spain) Javier Orellana

== Championship standings ==
Pos.	Rider	ARA (Spain)	ASS (Netherlands)	IMO (Italy)	DON (United Kingdom)	MIS (Italy)	POR (Portugal)	JER (Spain)	MAG (France)	Pts
1	(Spain) Augusto Fernández	4	1	1	3	1	1	6	3	155
2	(Spain) Javier Orellana	2	8	**2**	1	**4**	**3**	4	1	140
3	(Belgium) Angelo Licciardi	6	12	Ret	2	6	2	2	Ret	84
4	(Spain) Illán Fernández	5	Ret	6	4	3	4	**3**	12	83
5	(United Kingdom) Joshua Harland	10	11	3	**Ret**	5	7	1	Ret	72
6	(Spain) Mika Pérez	**3**	Ret	10	5	9	6	5	11	66
7	(Spain) Marc Miralles	1	**3**	5	6		DNS			62
8	(Estonia) Hannes Soomer	7	5	Ret	11	7	8	9	8	57
9	(Sweden) Jesper Hubner	9	2	4	Ret	Ret	5			51
10	(Netherlands) Jaimie van Sikkelerus		10	11	7	11	12	10	4	48
11	(Italy) Paolo Grassia	8	6	7	Ret	8	DNS	DNS		35
12	(New Zealand) Connor London	11	7	12	8	14	13	14	Ret	33
13	(United States) Alex Wisdom	13	9	13	9	16	10	16	10	32
14	(Canada) Braeden Ortt	17	Ret	14	Ret	12	11	17	6	21
15	(Switzerland) Carmen Geissler	12	Ret	Ret	10	10	DNS	11	Ret	21
16	(France) Dorian Laville								**2**	20
17	(Italy) Matteo Ciprietti					2				20
18	(United Kingdom) Stefan Hill	Ret	16	8	Ret	15	9	12	Ret	20
19	(Netherlands) Ricardo Brink		4							13
20	(Netherlands) Vasco van der Valk								5	11
21	(France) Gaëtan Gouget								7	9
22	(Mexico) Mario Luján Soto							7		9
23	(United Kingdom) Sam Wilford							8	Ret	8
24	(Netherlands) Maurice Karsijns								9	7
25	(Italy) Lorenzo Gabellini			9						7
26	(Spain) Josué Moreno	16	14	15	14	20	17	21		5
27	(United Kingdom) Daniel Drayton				12			23		4
28	(China) Jianwen Zhu	15	13	17						4
29	(Germany) Clarissa Miebach	Ret	17	16	Ret	17	16	Ret	13	3
30	(South Africa) Troy Bezuidenhout							13	Ret	3
31	(Australia) Lachlan Epis					13	18	19	Ret	3
32	(Netherlands) Max van Schoonhoven	Ret	Ret	Ret	13	21	DSQ	20	Ret	3
33	(Hungary) Alexander Somosi					Ret	15	18	14	3
34	(Portugal) David Ferreira						14	15		3
35	(United Kingdom) Ross Patterson	14	Ret							2
36	(Israel) Bar Levy	18	15	18	15	22	DNS	24		2
	(Norway) Stinius Viking Ødegård					18				0
	(Italy) Marco Malone					19				0
	(Italy) Riccardo Picciuto					Ret		22		0
	(New Zealand) Scout Fletcher								Ret	0
	(France) Maxime Bonnot								Ret	0
	(Australia) Brandon Demmery								Ret	0
	(Finland) Joona Ylikantola							Ret		0
Pos.	Rider	ARA (Spain)	ASS (Netherlands)	IMO (Italy)	DON (United Kingdom)	MIS (Italy)	POR (Portugal)	JER (Spain)	MAG (France)	Pts

Colour	Result
Gold	Winner
Silver	Second place
Bronze	Third place
Green	Points finish
Blue	Non-points finish
Blue	Non-classified finish (NC)
Purple	Retired (Ret)
Red	Did not qualify (DNQ)
Red	Did not pre-qualify (DNPQ)
Black	Disqualified (DSQ)
White	Did not start (DNS)
White	Withdrew (WD)
White	Race cancelled (C)
Blank	Did not practice (DNP)
Blank	Did not arrive (DNA)
Blank	Excluded (EX)

**Bold** – Pole position
Italics – Fastest lap
