= 2014 European Superstock 600 Championship =

Motorcycle racing series

2014 European Superstock 600 Championship
| Previous: | 2013 | Next: | 2015 |
Support series: Superbike World Championship; Supersport World Championship; FIM Superstock 1000 Cup; European Junior Cup

The 2014 European Superstock 600 Championship was the tenth season of the European Superstock 600 Championship. The season was contested over seven rounds, beginning on 12 April at Motorland Aragón in Spain, and concluding on 4 October at Circuit de Nevers Magny-Cours in France.

The championship was comfortably won by Italian rider Marco Faccani, who won five of the seven races for the San Carlo Team Italia. He finished 43 points clear of his closest rival Wayne Tessels, riding for his eponymous Wayne Racing Team. Third place was taken by Faccani's team-mate Andrea Tucci, 10 points behind Tessels. Niki Tuuli, who finished fourth in the championship, and Toprak Razgatlıoğlu – making an appearance as a wildcard at Magny-Cours – were the only other riders to win races during the season.

== Entry list ==
A total of 35 riders were entered for the 2014 season, including female rider Rebecca Bianchi. A number of front runners moved on to pastures new for 2014; 2013 champion Franco Morbidelli moved into the Moto2 World Championship, title contenders Alessandro Nocco, Christian Gamarino and Tony Coveña all progressed to the Supersport World Championship and Bastien Chesaux left to ride in the FIM CEV International Moto2 Championship. This left the door open for many new riders to fight for podiums and victories.

2014 entry list
| Team | Constructor | Motorcycle | No. | Rider | Rounds |
|---|---|---|---|---|---|
| Team Trasimeno | Yamaha | Yamaha YZF-R6 | 3 | (Italy) Vincenzo Lagonigro | All |
| San Carlo Team Italia | Kawasaki | Kawasaki ZX-6R | 5 | (Italy) Marco Faccani | All |
| San Carlo Team Italia | Kawasaki | Kawasaki ZX-6R | 44 | (Italy) Andrea Tucci | All |
| Agro-On & WIL Racedays; Racedays Honda | Honda | Honda CBR600RR | 6 | (United Kingdom) Chrissy Rouse | 5–7 |
| Agro-On & WIL Racedays; Racedays Honda | Honda | Honda CBR600RR | 21 | (United Kingdom) Harry Stafford | 1–3 |
| Agro-On & WIL Racedays; Racedays Honda | Honda | Honda CBR600RR | 29 | (New Zealand) Jake Lewis | All |
| Agro-On & WIL Racedays; Racedays Honda | Honda | Honda CBR600RR | 43 | (Italy) Kevin Manfredi | All |
| VFT Racing | Yamaha | Yamaha YZF-R6 | 7 | (Italy) Stefano Casalotti | All |
| VFT Racing | Yamaha | Yamaha YZF-R6 | 12 | (Italy) Christopher Gobbi | All |
| VFT Racing | Yamaha | Yamaha YZF-R6 | 28 | (Italy) Paolo Giacomini | All |
| Bike Service Racing | Honda | Honda CBR600RR | 9 | (Italy) Michael Canducci | 7 |
| Bike Service Racing | Kawasaki | Kawasaki ZX-6R | 9 | (Italy) Michael Canducci | 1–5 |
| Bike Service Racing | Kawasaki | Kawasaki ZX-6R | 15 | (Italy) Rebecca Bianchi | 1–3 |
| Bike Service Racing | Kawasaki | Kawasaki ZX-6R | 31 | (Italy) Riccardo Caruso | All |
| Bike Service Racing | Kawasaki | Kawasaki ZX-6R | 54 | (Turkey) Toprak Razgatlıoğlu | 7 |
| Team 10 Lap Racing | Kawasaki | Kawasaki ZX-6R | 10 | (Italy) Giuseppe De Gruttola | All |
| Team 10 Lap Racing | Kawasaki | Kawasaki ZX-6R | 23 | (Italy) Luca Salvadori | All |
| MTM Racing Team | Kawasaki | Kawasaki ZX-6R | 14 | (Netherlands) Koen Zeelen | 6 |
| MTM Racing Team | Kawasaki | Kawasaki ZX-6R | 19 | (Germany) Julian Puffe | All |
| MTM Racing Team | Kawasaki | Kawasaki ZX-6R | 26 | (France) Guillaume Antiga | 7 |
| MTM Racing Team | Kawasaki | Kawasaki ZX-6R | 52 | (Belgium) Gauthier Duwelz | 1–5 |
| MVR Racing | Yamaha | Yamaha YZF-R6 | 14 | (Netherlands) Koen Zeelen | 1–5 |
| MVR Racing | Yamaha | Yamaha YZF-R6 | 24 | (Belgium) Timothy Baken | 6–7 |
| MVR Racing | Yamaha | Yamaha YZF-R6 | 52 | (Belgium) Gauthier Duwelz | 6–7 |
| MVR Racing | Yamaha | Yamaha YZF-R6 | 92 | (Australia) Adrian Nestorovic | 1–5 |
| Team GO Eleven | Kawasaki | Kawasaki ZX-6R | 16 | (Italy) Filippo Scalbi | 6–7 |
| Team GO Eleven | Kawasaki | Kawasaki ZX-6R | 55 | (Ukraine) Ilya Mikhalchik | All |
| Team GO Eleven | Kawasaki | Kawasaki ZX-6R | 58 | (Croatia) Renato Novosel | 1–5 |
| Team Moto Ain | Yamaha | Yamaha YZF-R6 | 17 | (France) Hugo Clere | 7 |
| Kallio Racing | Yamaha | Yamaha YZF-R6 | 18 | (Finland) Niki Tuuli | All |
| Kallio Racing | Yamaha | Yamaha YZF-R6 | 22 | (Finland) Eemeli Lahti | All |
| Kallio Racing | Yamaha | Yamaha YZF-R6 | 33 | (Sweden) Lukas Bäckström | 7 |
| Kallio Racing | Yamaha | Yamaha YZF-R6 | 76 | (Finland) Valter Patronen | All |
| De Marco Racing Team | Yamaha | Yamaha YZF-R6 | 25 | (Italy) Michele Cloroformio | 4 |
| Team Garnier by ASPI | Yamaha | Yamaha YZF-R6 | 27 | (France) Guillaume Raymond | All |
| Team Motoxracing | Yamaha | Yamaha YZF-R6 | 32 | (Italy) Vincenzo Giorgianni | 1–4 |
| Team Motoxracing | Yamaha | Yamaha YZF-R6 | 96 | (Italy) Rodolfo Oliva | 5–7 |
| Swisscare Racing | Yamaha | Yamaha YZF-R6 | 34 | (Switzerland) Adrien Pittet | All |
| Planet-Motor Racing | Yamaha | Yamaha YZF-R6 | 36 | (France) Morgan Berchet | 7 |
| Berclaz Racing Team | Kawasaki | Kawasaki ZX-6R | 39 | (Spain) Pedro Rodríguez | 6–7 |
| Berclaz Racing Team | Kawasaki | Kawasaki ZX-6R | 42 | (Switzerland) Stéphane Frossard | 1–3 |
| Berclaz Racing Team | Kawasaki | Kawasaki ZX-6R | 116 | (Switzerland) David Chevalier | 7 |
| Berclaz Racing Team | Kawasaki | Kawasaki ZX-6R | 118 | (Italy) Agostino Santoro | 4–5 |
| SLMoteur | Yamaha | Yamaha YZF-R6 | 41 | (France) Anthony Dumont | 7 |
| Thoonen/Ten Kate Racing | Honda | Honda CBR600RR | 46 | (Netherlands) Davy Thoonen | 2 |
| Team Hartog-Racing Against Cancer | Suzuki | Suzuki GSX-R600 | 47 | (Netherlands) Rob Hartog | 2 |
| Mottini Corse ASD | Yamaha | Yamaha YZF-R6 | 53 | (Italy) Nicola Jr. Morrentino | 4 |
| Verkeersschool Nobel Racing | Suzuki | Suzuki GSX-R600 | 57 | (Netherlands) Chris Nobel | 2 |
| BCC Racing Team | Yamaha | Yamaha YZF-R6 | 59 | (Switzerland) Roman Fischer | 2 |
| Talmácsi Racing | Honda | Honda CBR600RR | 61 | (Italy) Alessandro Zaccone | 4–7 |
| Talmácsi Racing | Honda | Honda CBR600RR | 94 | (Hungary) Richárd Bódis | All |
| Scuderia Maran.ga. Racing | Kawasaki | Kawasaki ZX-6R | 63 | (Italy) Davide Stirpe | 4 |
| Evans Bros. Racing Team | Honda | Honda CBR600RR | 64 | (Italy) Federico Caricasulo | All |
| Floramo Monaco Racing Team | Honda | Honda CBR600RR | 66 | (Italy) Federico Monti | 4 |
| Orelac Racing | Yamaha | Yamaha YZF-R6 | 74 | (Spain) Pau Tortosa | 1 |
| Wayne Racing Team | Suzuki | Suzuki GSX-R600 | 77 | (Netherlands) Wayne Tessels | All |
| Sonic Pro Race | Honda | Honda CBR600RR | 78 | (Italy) Gennaro Sabatino | 4 |
| Mouss Racing Team | Yamaha | Yamaha YZF-R6 | 88 | (France) Mathieu Marchal | 1–4, 6–7 |
| Badan IXS Racing Team | Yamaha | Yamaha YZF-R6 | 91 | (Switzerland) Bryan Leu | 7 |
| MC World | Yamaha | Yamaha YZF-R6 | 93 | (Italy) Roberto Mercandelli | 3 |
| G.A.S. Racing Team | Yamaha | Yamaha YZF-R6 | 95 | (Italy) Michael Ruben Rinaldi | All |
| Gradaracorse Racing Team | Yamaha | Yamaha YZF-R6 | 114 | (Italy) Massimiliano Spedale | 3–4 |
| S2B Racing Team A.S.D. | Yamaha | Yamaha YZF-R6 | 130 | (Italy) Federico Sanchioni | 4 |
| Team CMS | Yamaha | Yamaha YZF-R6 | 193 | (France) Alexandre Rodrigues | 7 |

Key
Regular rider
Wildcard rider
Replacement rider

== Championship standings ==
| Pos | Rider | Bike | ARA (Spain) | ASS (Netherlands) | IMO (Italy) | MIS (Italy) | POR (Portugal) | JER (Spain) | MAG (France) | Pts |
|---|---|---|---|---|---|---|---|---|---|---|
| 1 | (Italy) Marco Faccani | Kawasaki | **1** | 10 | **1** | **1** | 1 | **1** | Ret | 131 |
| 2 | (Netherlands) Wayne Tessels | Suzuki | 3 | 3 | 9 | 4 | **2** | 5 | 11 | 88 |
| 3 | (Italy) Andrea Tucci | Kawasaki | 2 | 5 | 8 | 10 | 6 | 4 | 6 | 78 |
| 4 | (Finland) Niki Tuuli | Yamaha | 4 | 1 | 2 | Ret | Ret | Ret | 3 | 74 |
| 5 | (Italy) Federico Caricasulo | Honda | DSQ | **Ret** | 6 | 2 | 3 | 2 | Ret | 66 |
| 6 | (Ukraine) Ilya Mikhalchik | Kawasaki | 5 | 9 | 7 | 29 | 4 | 8 | 4 | 61 |
| 7 | (Belgium) Gauthier Duwelz | Kawasaki | 8 | 6 | Ret | 11 | DNS | | | 48 |
| 7 | (Belgium) Gauthier Duwelz | Yamaha | | | | | | 3 | 7 | 48 |
| 8 | (Italy) Luca Salvadori | Kawasaki | 6 | 8 | 4 | 9 | 12 | Ret | 12 | 46 |
| 9 | (Italy) Kevin Manfredi | Honda | 9 | 2 | Ret | 8 | Ret | 13 | Ret | 38 |
| 10 | (Finland) Eemeli Lahti | Yamaha | 15 | 7 | 12 | 17 | 8 | 14 | 8 | 32 |
| 11 | (Italy) Michael Ruben Rinaldi | Yamaha | 17 | 12 | 5 | 12 | 18 | 6 | 20 | 29 |
| 12 | (Italy) Stefano Casalotti | Yamaha | 7 | Ret | 3 | Ret | 14 | Ret | 18 | 27 |
| 13 | (Turkey) Toprak Razgatlıoğlu | Kawasaki | | | | | | | 1 | 25 |
| 14 | (Hungary) Richárd Bódis | Honda | 20 | 24 | 24 | Ret | 5 | 7 | 13 | 23 |
| 15 | (France) Mathieu Marchal | Yamaha | 12 | Ret | 10 | Ret | | 11 | 9 | 22 |
| 16 | (France) Anthony Dumont | Yamaha | | | | | | | 2 | 20 |
| 17 | (Australia) Adrian Nestorovic | Yamaha | 10 | 15 | 14 | 15 | 7 | | | 19 |
| 18 | (Germany) Julian Puffe | Kawasaki | 18 | 20 | 13 | 13 | 10 | Ret | 10 | 18 |
| 19 | (Italy) Davide Stirpe | Kawasaki | | | | 3 | | | | 16 |
| 20 | (Italy) Alessandro Zaccone | Honda | | | | 7 | 9 | 20 | Ret | 16 |
| 21 | (Netherlands) Rob Hartog | Suzuki | | 4 | | | | | | 13 |
| 22 | (France) Hugo Clere | Yamaha | | | | | | | 5 | 11 |
| 23 | (Italy) Gennaro Sabatino | Yamaha | | | | 5 | | | | 11 |
| 24 | (Italy) Nicola Jr. Morrentino | Yamaha | | | | 6 | | | | 10 |
| 25 | (United Kingdom) Chrissy Rouse | Honda | | | | | 11 | 12 | 17 | 9 |
| 26 | (Italy) Riccardo Caruso | Kawasaki | Ret | Ret | 27 | 27 | 21 | 9 | Ret | 7 |
| 27 | (Switzerland) Adrien Pittet | Yamaha | DSQ | 14 | 18 | 23 | 13 | 22 | 14 | 7 |
| 28 | (Belgium) Timothy Baken | Yamaha | | | | | | 10 | 21 | 6 |
| 29 | (Italy) Roberto Mercandelli | Yamaha | | | 11 | | | | | 5 |
| 30 | (Italy) Christopher Gobbi | Yamaha | Ret | 11 | Ret | Ret | 17 | 21 | Ret | 5 |
| 31 | (New Zealand) Jake Lewis | Honda | 11 | Ret | 16 | 19 | 16 | 16 | 22 | 5 |
| 32 | (Netherlands) Koen Zeelen | Yamaha | 14 | 13 | 20 | 21 | Ret | | | 5 |
| 32 | (Netherlands) Koen Zeelen | Kawasaki | | | | | | 25 | | 5 |
| 33 | (Italy) Michael Canducci | Kawasaki | 13 | Ret | 17 | Ret | 20 | | | 3 |
| 33 | (Italy) Michael Canducci | Honda | | | | | | | Ret | 3 |
| 34 | (Italy) Federico Monti | Honda | | | | 14 | | | | 2 |
| 35 | (France) Morgan Berchet | Yamaha | | | | | | | **15** | 1 |
| 36 | (Italy) Vincenzo Lagonigro | Yamaha | 26 | 21 | 25 | 26 | 22 | 15 | Ret | 1 |
| 37 | (Italy) Giuseppe De Gruttola | Kawasaki | 25 | Ret | Ret | Ret | 15 | 26 | Ret | 1 |
| 38 | (Finland) Valter Patronen | Yamaha | 16 | Ret | 15 | 20 | 19 | 18 | 23 | 1 |
| | (Spain) Pedro Rodríguez | Kawasaki | | | | | | 19 | 16 | 0 |
| | (Italy) Agostino Santoro | Kawasaki | | | | 16 | Ret | | | 0 |
| | (Netherlands) Chris Nobel | Suzuki | | 16 | | | | | | 0 |
| | (Italy) Filippo Scalbi | Kawasaki | | | | | | 17 | Ret | 0 |
| | (Italy) Vincenzo Giorgianni | Yamaha | 23 | 17 | 21 | 25 | | | | 0 |
| | (Italy) Paolo Giacomini | Yamaha | 21 | Ret | 19 | 18 | 24 | 23 | 25 | 0 |
| | (France) Guillaume Raymond | Yamaha | 19 | 19 | 22 | 28 | 23 | Ret | Ret | 0 |
| | (Switzerland) Bryan Leu | Yamaha | | | | | | | 19 | 0 |
| | (Italy) Massimiliano Spedale | Yamaha | | | Ret | 22 | | | | 0 |
| | (Switzerland) Roman Fischer | Yamaha | | 22 | | | | | | 0 |
| | (Switzerland) Stéphane Frossard | Kawasaki | 22 | 25 | 23 | | | | | 0 |
| | (Italy) Rebecca Bianchi | Kawasaki | 24 | 23 | Ret | | | | | 0 |
| | (Sweden) Lukas Bäckström | Yamaha | | | | | | | 24 | 0 |
| | (Italy) Rodolfo Oliva | Yamaha | | | | | 25 | 24 | 27 | 0 |
| | (Italy) Federico Sanchioni | Yamaha | | | | 24 | | | | 0 |
| | (Croatia) Renato Novosel | Kawasaki | 29 | Ret | 26 | Ret | 26 | | | 0 |
| | (Switzerland) David Chevalier | Yamaha | | | | | | | 26 | 0 |
| | (Spain) Pau Tortosa | Yamaha | 27 | | | | | | | 0 |
| | (United Kingdom) Harry Stafford | Honda | 28 | Ret | DNS | | | | | 0 |
| | (Italy) Michele Cloroformio | Yamaha | | | | 30 | | | | 0 |
| | (France) Guillaume Antiga | Kawasaki | | | | | | | Ret | 0 |
| | (France) Alexandre Rodrigues | Yamaha | | | | | | | Ret | 0 |
| | (Netherlands) Davy Thoonen | Honda | | Ret | | | | | | 0 |
| Pos | Rider | Bike | ARA (Spain) | ASS (Netherlands) | IMO (Italy) | MIS (Italy) | POR (Portugal) | JER (Spain) | MAG (France) | Pts |

| Colour | Result |
|---|---|
| Gold | Winner |
| Silver | Second place |
| Bronze | Third place |
| Green | Points classification |
| Blue | Non-points classification |
| Blue | Non-classified finish (NC) |
| Purple | Retired, not classified (Ret) |
| Red | Did not qualify (DNQ) |
| Red | Did not pre-qualify (DNPQ) |
| Black | Disqualified (DSQ) |
| White | Did not start (DNS) |
| White | Withdrew (WD) |
| White | Race cancelled (C) |
| Blank | Did not practice (DNP) |
| Blank | Did not arrive (DNA) |
| Blank | Excluded (EX) |

**Bold** – Pole position
Italics – Fastest lap
