= 2010 Aragon motorcycle Grand Prix =

13th round of the 2010 FIM Road Racing World Championship season

2010 Aragon Grand Prix
Race details
- Race 13 of 18 races in the 2010 Grand Prix motorcycle racing season
- Date: 19 September 2010
- Official name: Gran Premio A-Style de Aragón
- Location: MotorLand Aragón
- Course: Permanent racing facility; 5.078 km (3.155 mi)

MotoGP
Pole position
- Rider: (Australia) Casey Stoner
- Time: 1:48.942
Fastest lap
- Rider: (Spain) Dani Pedrosa
- Time: 1:49.521
Podium
- First: (Australia) Casey Stoner
- Second: (Spain) Dani Pedrosa
- Third: (United States) Nicky Hayden

Moto2
Pole position
- Rider: (Italy) Andrea Iannone
- Time: 1:55.148
Fastest lap
- Rider: (Italy) Andrea Iannone
- Time: 1:55.003
Podium
- First: (Italy) Andrea Iannone
- Second: (Spain) Julián Simón
- Third: (Hungary) Gábor Talmácsi

125cc
Pole position
- Rider: (Spain) Marc Márquez
- Time: 1:59.335
Fastest lap
- Rider: (Spain) Pol Espargaró
- Time: 1:59.509
Podium
- First: (Spain) Pol Espargaró
- Second: (Spain) Nicolás Terol
- Third: (United Kingdom) Bradley Smith

The 2010 Aragon motorcycle Grand Prix was the thirteenth round of the 2010 Grand Prix motorcycle racing season. It took place on the weekend of 17–19 September 2010 at the MotorLand Aragón circuit. It was the first running of the event.

== MotoGP classification ==
Pos.	No.	Rider	Team	Manufacturer	Laps	Time/Retired	Grid	Points
1	27	(Australia) Casey Stoner	Ducati Team	Ducati	23	42:16.530	1	25
2	26	(Spain) Dani Pedrosa	Repsol Honda Team	Honda	23	+5.148	3	20
3	69	(United States) Nicky Hayden	Ducati Team	Ducati	23	+9.496	4	16
4	99	(Spain) Jorge Lorenzo	Fiat Yamaha Team	Yamaha	23	+9.580	2	13
5	11	(United States) Ben Spies	Monster Yamaha Tech 3	Yamaha	23	+13.771	5	11
6	46	(Italy) Valentino Rossi	Fiat Yamaha Team	Yamaha	23	+27.330	7	10
7	58	(Italy) Marco Simoncelli	San Carlo Honda Gresini	Honda	23	+28.511	9	9
8	19	(Spain) Álvaro Bautista	Rizla Suzuki MotoGP	Suzuki	23	+35.254	12	8
9	33	(Italy) Marco Melandri	San Carlo Honda Gresini	Honda	23	+35.393	14	7
10	41	(Spain) Aleix Espargaró	Pramac Racing Team	Ducati	23	+35.467	13	6
11	40	(Spain) Héctor Barberá	Páginas Amarillas Aspar	Ducati	23	+35.522	10	5
12	5	(United States) Colin Edwards	Monster Yamaha Tech 3	Yamaha	23	+45.360	11	4
13	7	(Japan) Hiroshi Aoyama	Interwetten Honda MotoGP	Honda	23	+48.319	15	3
14	36	(Finland) Mika Kallio	Pramac Racing Team	Ducati	23	+58.047	16	2
Ret	4	(Italy) Andrea Dovizioso	Repsol Honda Team	Honda	22	Accident	8	
Ret	14	(France) Randy de Puniet	LCR Honda MotoGP	Honda	15	Accident	6	

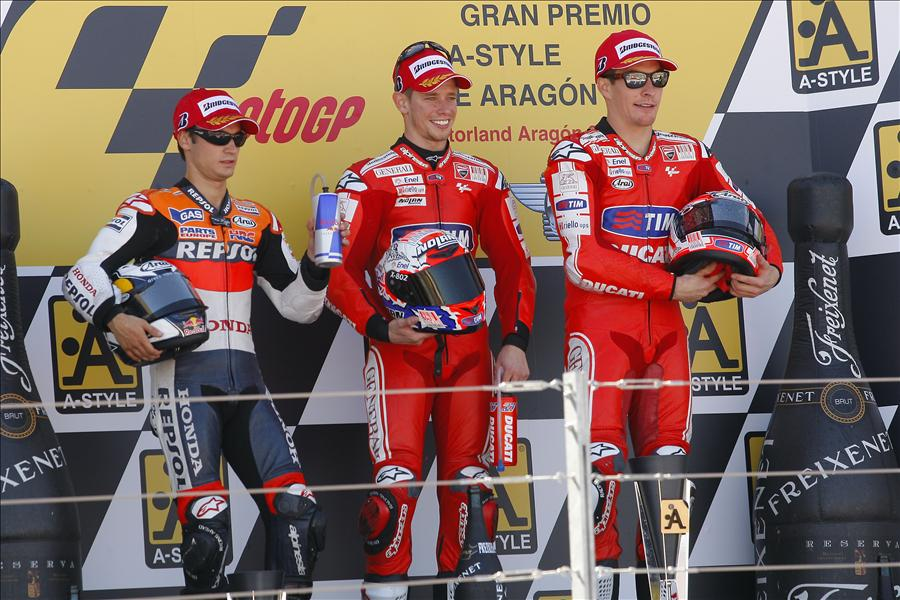
Casey Stoner, Dani Pedrosa and Nicky Hayden on the podium after finishing first, second and third at the MotoGP race.

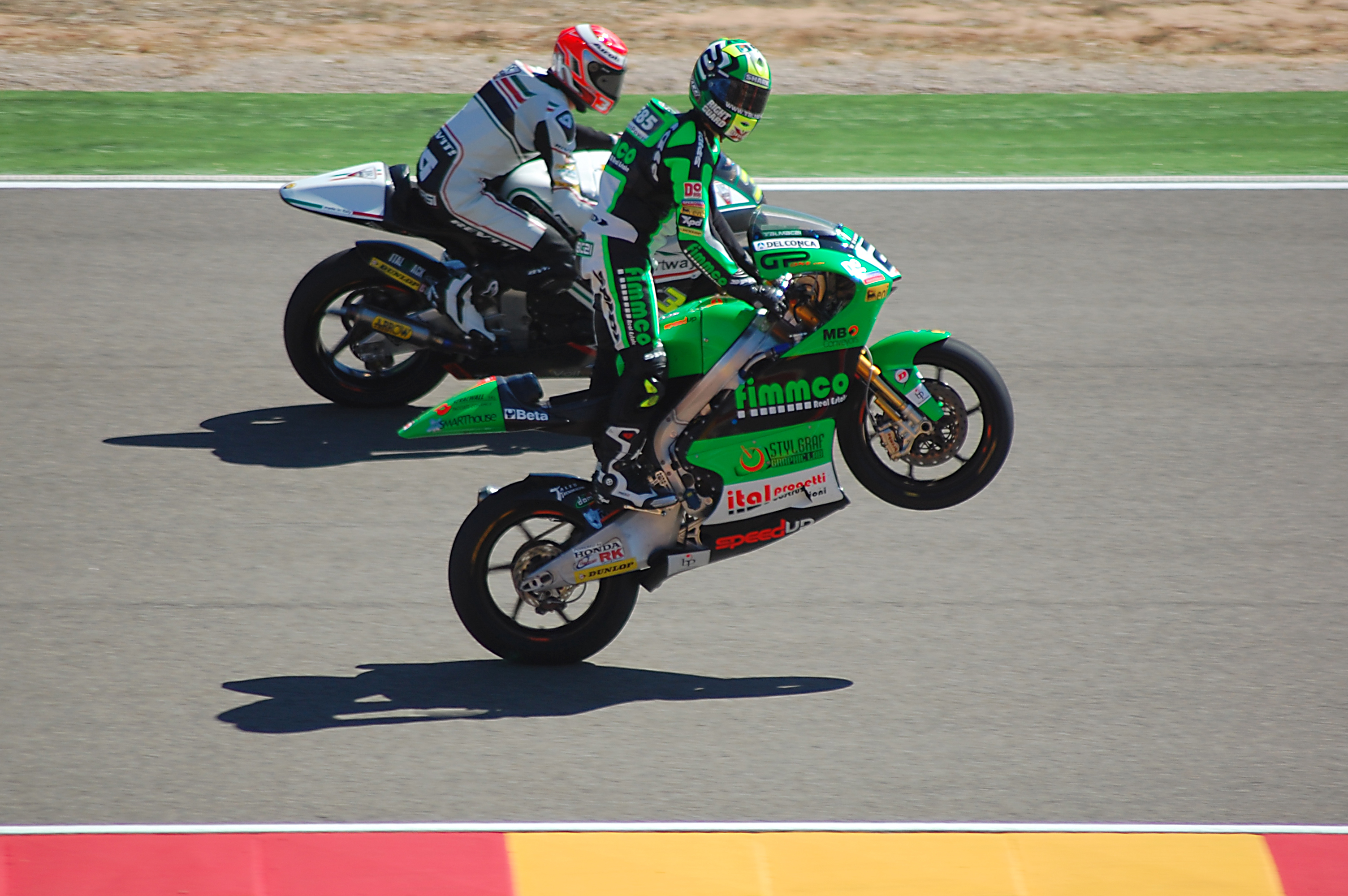
Andrea Iannone, celebrating after winning the Moto2 race.

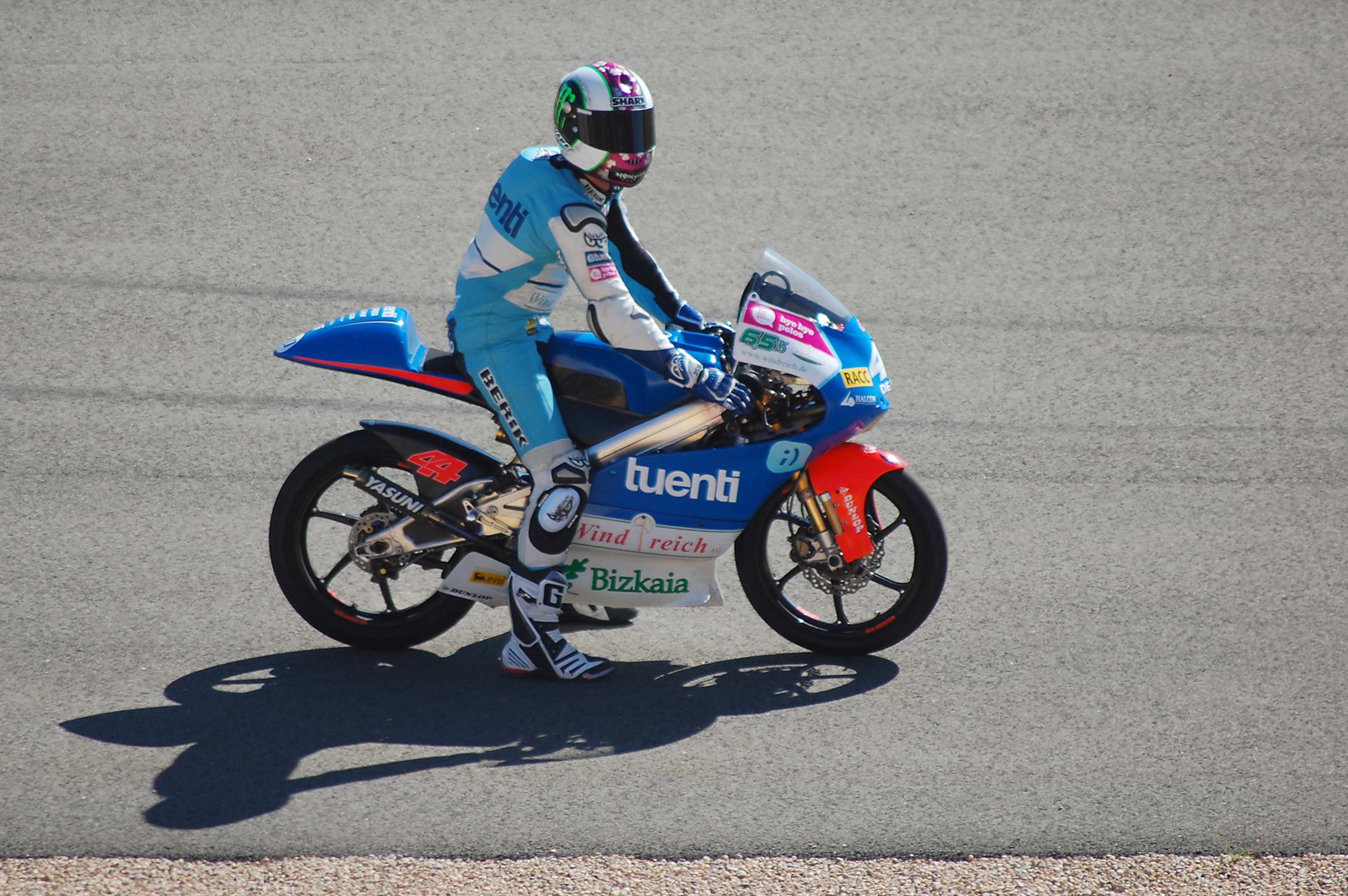
Pol Espargaró, sitting on his bike after winning the 125cc race.

== Moto2 classification ==
Pos.	No.	Rider	Manufacturer	Laps	Time/Retired	Grid	Points
1	29	(Italy) Andrea Iannone	Speed Up	21	40:33.264	1	25
2	60	(Spain) Julián Simón	Suter	21	+6.203	4	20
3	2	(Hungary) Gábor Talmácsi	Speed Up	21	+6.276	7	16
4	24	(Spain) Toni Elías	Moriwaki	21	+7.123	12	13
5	3	(Italy) Simone Corsi	Motobi	21	+9.160	5	11
6	16	(France) Jules Cluzel	Suter	21	+12.881	14	10
7	77	(Switzerland) Dominique Aegerter	Suter	21	+12.987	11	9
8	45	(United Kingdom) Scott Redding	Suter	21	+18.881	2	8
9	65	(Germany) Stefan Bradl	Suter	21	+20.893	9	7
10	12	(Switzerland) Thomas Lüthi	Moriwaki	21	+21.171	20	6
11	71	(Italy) Claudio Corti	Suter	21	+21.426	6	5
12	72	(Japan) Yuki Takahashi	Tech 3	21	+21.978	26	4
13	63	(France) Mike Di Meglio	Suter	21	+22.171	15	3
14	51	(Italy) Michele Pirro	Moriwaki	21	+24.747	8	2
15	14	(Thailand) Ratthapark Wilairot	Bimota	21	+30.452	21	1
16	43	(Spain) Román Ramos	MIR Racing	21	+31.716	29	
17	55	(Spain) Héctor Faubel	Suter	21	+33.594	19	
18	17	(Czech Republic) Karel Abraham	FTR	21	+33.801	22	
19	44	(Italy) Roberto Rolfo	Suter	21	+37.621	23	
20	40	(Spain) Sergio Gadea	Pons Kalex	21	+39.428	25	
21	8	(Australia) Anthony West	MZ-RE Honda	21	+43.799	28	
22	6	(Spain) Alex Debón	FTR	21	+44.855	27	
23	64	(Colombia) Santiago Hernández	Moriwaki	21	+45.164	31	
24	88	(Spain) Yannick Guerra	Moriwaki	21	+59.926	38	
25	28	(Japan) Kazuki Watanabe	Suter	21	+1:11.176	40	
26	59	(Italy) Niccolò Canepa	Bimota	21	+1:11.208	36	
27	53	(France) Valentin Debise	ADV	21	+1:11.364	33	
28	5	(Spain) Joan Olivé	Promoharris	21	+1:22.224	39	
Ret	80	(Spain) Axel Pons	Pons Kalex	13	Accident	30	
Ret	95	(Qatar) Mashel Al Naimi	BQR-Moto2	12	Accident	34	
Ret	9	(United States) Kenny Noyes	Promoharris	12	Retirement	35	
Ret	35	(Italy) Raffaele de Rosa	Tech 3	10	Accident	10	
Ret	75	(Italy) Mattia Pasini	Suter	9	Retirement	24	
Ret	39	(Venezuela) Robertino Pietri	Suter	8	Accident	37	
Ret	15	(San Marino) Alex de Angelis	Motobi	6	Accident	3	
Ret	54	(United Kingdom) Kev Coghlan	FTR	1	Retirement	13	
Ret	10	(Spain) Fonsi Nieto	Moriwaki	0	Collision	32	
Ret	25	(Italy) Alex Baldolini	I.C.P.	0	Collision	17	
Ret	4	(Spain) Ricky Cardús	Bimota	0	Collision	18	
Ret	68	(Colombia) Yonny Hernández	BQR-Moto2	0	Collision	16	
OFFICIAL MOTO2 REPORT

== 125cc classification ==
Randy Krummenacher was black flagged for crashing on the first lap and taking down Marc Márquez in the process. The race stewards deemed the accident intentional and subsequently disqualified him.

Pos.	No.	Rider	Manufacturer	Laps	Time/Retired	Grid	Points
1	44	(Spain) Pol Espargaró	Derbi	19	38:14.248	5	25
2	40	(Spain) Nicolás Terol	Aprilia	19	+0.050	3	20
3	38	(United Kingdom) Bradley Smith	Aprilia	19	+9.460	6	16
4	7	(Spain) Efrén Vázquez	Derbi	19	+15.999	4	13
5	11	(Germany) Sandro Cortese	Derbi	19	+18.396	2	11
6	71	(Japan) Tomoyoshi Koyama	Aprilia	19	+18.967	10	10
7	12	(Spain) Esteve Rabat	Aprilia	19	+25.971	11	9
8	94	(Germany) Jonas Folger	Aprilia	19	+26.129	9	8
9	99	(United Kingdom) Danny Webb	Aprilia	19	+39.717	12	7
10	39	(Spain) Luis Salom	Aprilia	19	+42.719	13	6
11	26	(Spain) Adrián Martín	Aprilia	19	+48.635	14	5
12	14	(France) Johann Zarco	Aprilia	19	+56.065	8	4
13	78	(Germany) Marcel Schrötter	Honda	19	+1:01.926	19	3
14	84	(Czech Republic) Jakub Kornfeil	Aprilia	19	+1:02.020	18	2
15	50	(Norway) Sturla Fagerhaug	Aprilia	19	+1:15.030	24	1
16	63	(Malaysia) Zulfahmi Khairuddin	Aprilia	19	+1:18.689	15	
17	23	(Spain) Alberto Moncayo	Aprilia	19	+1:18.852	16	
18	72	(Italy) Marco Ravaioli	Lambretta	19	+1:36.185	28	
19	58	(Spain) Joan Perelló	Honda	19	+1:54.278	25	
20	37	(France) Robin Barbosa	Aprilia	19	+1:54.564	26	
21	27	(Italy) Alejandro Pardo	Aprilia	18	+1 lap	29	
22	28	(Spain) Josep Rodríguez	Aprilia	18	+1 lap	20	
Ret	15	(Italy) Simone Grotzkyj	Aprilia	15	Retirement	21	
Ret	69	(France) Louis Rossi	Aprilia	13	Retirement	22	
Ret	16	(Spain) Pedro Rodríguez	Aprilia	11	Retirement	23	
Ret	56	(Hungary) Péter Sebestyén	Aprilia	10	Retirement	27	
Ret	53	(Netherlands) Jasper Iwema	Aprilia	8	Retirement	17	
Ret	86	(Germany) Kevin Hanus	Honda	0	Accident	30	
Ret	93	(Spain) Marc Márquez	Derbi	0	Collision	1	
DSQ	35	(Switzerland) Randy Krummenacher	Aprilia	6	Caused an accident	7	
DNS	55	(Spain) Isaac Viñales	Lambretta		Did not start		
OFFICIAL 125CC REPORT

== Championship standings after the race (MotoGP) ==
Below are the standings for the top five riders and constructors after round thirteen has concluded.

Riders' Championship standings

Pos.	Rider	Points
1	(Spain) Jorge Lorenzo	284
2	(Spain) Dani Pedrosa	228
3	(Australia) Casey Stoner	155
4	(Italy) Valentino Rossi	140
5	(Italy) Andrea Dovizioso	139

Constructors' Championship standings

Pos.	Constructor	Points
1	(Japan) Yamaha	293
2	(Japan) Honda	265
3	(Italy) Ducati	195
4	(Japan) Suzuki	72

- Note: Only the top five positions are included for both sets of standings.

Previous race: 2010 San Marino Grand Prix	FIM Grand Prix World Championship; 2010 season	Next race: 2010 Japanese Grand Prix
Previous race: None	Aragon motorcycle Grand Prix	Next race: 2011 Aragon Grand Prix
