= 2015 European Superstock 600 Championship =

2015 European Superstock 600 Championship
Previous:	2014	Next:	none
Support series: Superbike World Championship; Supersport World Championship; FIM Superstock 1000 Cup; European Junior Cup

The 2015 European Superstock 600 Championship was the eleventh season of the European Superstock 600 Championship, a support class to the Superbike World Championship at its European rounds. The championship used 600 cc production motorcycles and was reserved for riders between 15 and 24 years of age. The 2015 season was contested over eight races at seven meetings, beginning at Motorland Aragón on 11 April and ending at Circuit de Nevers Magny-Cours on 3 October.

With five victories and a third place in the first six races, Toprak Razgatlıoğlu of Turkey secured the championship title with two races to spare. He led the season's only other winners, Italy's Michael Ruben Rinaldi, by 59 points, Federico Caricasulo – also from Italy – a further 12 points behind in third, and Augusto Fernández from Spain, a further 6 points behind in fourth.

== Race calendar and results ==
Round	Country	Circuit	Date	Pole position	Fastest lap	Winning rider	Winning team
1	Spain	Motorland Aragón	11 April	(Italy) Michael Ruben Rinaldi	(Italy) Michael Ruben Rinaldi	(Turkey) Toprak Razgatlıoğlu	Kawasaki Puccetti Racing
1	Spain	Motorland Aragón	12 April	(Italy) Michael Ruben Rinaldi	(Turkey) Toprak Razgatlıoğlu	(Turkey) Toprak Razgatlıoğlu	Kawasaki Puccetti Racing
2	Netherlands	TT Circuit Assen	18 April	(Turkey) Toprak Razgatlıoğlu	(France) Hugo Clere	(Turkey) Toprak Razgatlıoğlu	Kawasaki Puccetti Racing
3	Italy	Autodromo Enzo e Dino Ferrari	9 May	(Turkey) Toprak Razgatlıoğlu	(Turkey) Toprak Razgatlıoğlu	(Turkey) Toprak Razgatlıoğlu	Kawasaki Puccetti Racing
4	Portugal	Autódromo Internacional do Algarve	6 June	(Italy) Michael Ruben Rinaldi	(Uruguay) Maximiliano Gerardo	(Turkey) Toprak Razgatlıoğlu	Kawasaki Puccetti Racing
5	Italy	Misano World Circuit Marco Simoncelli	20 June	(Spain) Augusto Fernández	(Italy) Federico Caricasulo	(Italy) Federico Caricasulo	PATA-Honda Junior Team
6	Spain	Circuito de Jerez	19 September	(Italy) Michael Ruben Rinaldi	(Italy) Michael Ruben Rinaldi	(Italy) Michael Ruben Rinaldi	San Carlo Team Italia
7	France	Circuit de Nevers Magny-Cours	3 October	(Italy) Michael Ruben Rinaldi	(Spain) Augusto Fernández	(Spain) Augusto Fernández	PATA-Honda Junior Team

== Championship standings ==
Pos.	Rider	Bike	ARA (Spain)		ASS (Netherlands)	IMO (Italy)	POR (Portugal)	MIS (Italy)	JER (Spain)	MAG (France)	Pts
1	(Turkey) Toprak Razgatlıoğlu	Kawasaki	1	1	**1**	**1**	1	3	DNS	3	157
2	(Italy) Michael Ruben Rinaldi	Kawasaki	**2**	**19**	2	Ret	**2**	4	**1**	**Ret**	98
3	(Italy) Federico Caricasulo	Honda	3	2	7	Ret	3	1	DNS		86
4	(Spain) Augusto Fernández	Honda	8	6	27	10	5	**Ret**	2	1	80
5	(Finland) Niki Tuuli	Yamaha	5	5	3	Ret	7	2	5	Ret	78
6	(Italy) Andrea Tucci	Kawasaki	Ret	4	9	3	4	5	4	Ret	73
7	(Italy) Luca Vitali	Kawasaki	Ret	8	Ret	6	Ret	6	7	4	50
8	(Italy) Davide Stirpe	Kawasaki	10	11	13	Ret	15	7	3	15	41
9	(Belgium) Gauthier Duwelz	Yamaha	4	3	12	9					40
10	(France) Hugo Clere	Yamaha	21	Ret	4	DNS	11	11	10	6	39
11	(Netherlands) Rob Hartog	Kawasaki	20	15	6	16	6	13	9	8	39
12	(Italy) Nicola Jr. Morrentino	Kawasaki	12	7	16	4	12	9			37
13	(Ukraine) Ilya Mikhalchik	Kawasaki	11	9	10	17		19	12	5	33
14	(Finland) Eemeli Lahti	Yamaha	18	12	8	12	10	Ret	20	7	31
15	(Italy) Axel Bassani	Kawasaki							6	2	30
16	(Italy) Christopher Gobbi	Yamaha	Ret	Ret	Ret	7	8	8	11	Ret	30
17	(Germany) Julian Puffe	Kawasaki	9	10	5		13	Ret	Ret	21	27
18	(France) Guillaume Antiga	Kawasaki	6	29	Ret	15	19	12	14	9	24
19	(Italy) Alessandro Zaccone	Honda	16	16	14	Ret		10	8	11	21
20	(Italy) Roberto Mercandelli	Yamaha				2					20
21	(Italy) Stefano Casalotti	Yamaha	Ret	17	11	5	DNS	14	19	Ret	18
22	(Italy) Kevin Manfredi	Honda	7	23	Ret	8	17				17
23	(Uruguay) Maximiliano Gerardo	Honda	Ret	18	Ret	20	9	Ret	15	Ret	8
24	(France) Mathieu Marchal	Yamaha	13	Ret	18	11					8
25	(Italy) Riccardo Caruso	Kawasaki	14	14	23	18	18	Ret	13	16	7
26	(France) Alexandre Santo Domingues	Yamaha								10	6
27	(Germany) Toni Finsterbusch	Kawasaki					14	Ret	Ret	13	5
28	(New Zealand) Jake Lewis	Yamaha	19	21	17	19	DNS		21	12	4
29	(Italy) Agostino Santoro	Yamaha				13					3
30	(France) Anthony Dumont	Honda	17	13	Ret						3
31	(Italy) Massimiliano Spedale	Yamaha	15	20	21	14	16	Ret	17	Ret	3
32	(Italy) Michael Canducci	Honda								14	2
33	(Italy) Vincenzo Lagonigro	Yamaha						15			1
34	(Spain) Alexandre Sirerol	Kawasaki	22	Ret	15	DNS			30		1
	(Netherlands) Bryan Schouten	Yamaha					22	16	16	Ret	0
	(Croatia) Ivan Višak	Kawasaki					23	Ret	24	17	0
	(Italy) Alex Bernardi	Yamaha	28	Ret	29	22	21	17	Ret	Ret	0
	(France) Yvan Laetzig	Yamaha								18	0
	(Belgium) Angelo Licciardi	Honda	Ret	34	26	25	20	20	18	19	0
	(Spain) Aleix Aulestia	Yamaha	Ret	22	20	21		18			0
	(Switzerland) Roman Fischer	Yamaha	Ret	28	19	Ret		22	25		0
	(New Zealand) Alastair Hoogenboezem	Honda						27	Ret	20	0
	(Italy) Elia Mengoni	Honda						21			0
	(Belgium) Livio Santorelli	Honda							29	22	0
	(Brazil) Pedro Sampaio	Yamaha	27	27	28	24	24	25	22	Ret	0
	(Hungary) Richárd Bódis	Kawasaki	24	Ret	22	Ret					0
	(Italy) Rodolfo Oliva	Yamaha				23	25	23	26	Ret	0
	(Australia) Lachlan Epis	Kawasaki	30	30	31	27	27	26	23	Ret	0
	(Netherlands) Ricardo Brink	Yamaha	23	26	Ret						0
	(Italy) Manuel Tatasciore	MV Agusta	26	24	24	Ret					0
	(Germany) Ricarda Neubauer	Kawasaki	31	33	30	28	26	24	27	Ret	0
	(Italy) Manuel Pagliani	MV Agusta	25	25	Ret	26					0
	(Netherlands) Bobby Bos	Honda			25						0
	(Spain) Abian Santana	Yamaha							28		0
	(Spain) Diego Carbó	Yamaha	29	32							0
	(Spain) Christian Palomares	Yamaha	Ret	31							0
	(Portugal) Pedro Barbosa	Yamaha								Ret	0
	(Italy) Francesco Cocco	MV Agusta						Ret			0
	(Italy) Gennaro Sabatino	Kawasaki						Ret			0
	(United Kingdom) Joshua Harland	Honda					Ret				0
	(Netherlands) Chris Nobel	Suzuki			Ret						0
Pos.	Rider	Bike	ARA (Spain)		ASS (Netherlands)	IMO (Italy)	POR (Portugal)	MIS (Italy)	JER (Spain)	MAG (France)	Pts

Colour	Result
Gold	Winner
Silver	Second place
Bronze	Third place
Green	Points classification
Blue	Non-points classification
Blue	Non-classified finish (NC)
Purple	Retired, not classified (Ret)
Red	Did not qualify (DNQ)
Red	Did not pre-qualify (DNPQ)
Black	Disqualified (DSQ)
White	Did not start (DNS)
White	Withdrew (WD)
White	Race cancelled (C)
Blank	Did not practice (DNP)
Blank	Did not arrive (DNA)
Blank	Excluded (EX)

**Bold** – Pole position
Italics – Fastest lap

== Entry list ==
2015 entry list
Team	Constructor	Motorcycle	No.	Rider	Rounds
GP Project	Honda	Honda CBR600RR	2	(Italy) Elia Mengoni	5
R2B Racing Team Holland	Yamaha	Yamaha YZF-R6	4	(Netherlands) Ricardo Brink	1–2
R2 MotorSport Team	Kawasaki	Kawasaki ZX-6R	5	(Croatia) Ivan Višak	4–7
R2 MotorSport Team	Kawasaki	Kawasaki ZX-6R	94	(Hungary) Richárd Bódis	1–3
Team Rosso e Nero	Yamaha	Yamaha YZF-R6	7	(Italy) Stefano Casalotti	All
Sonic PRO Race	Yamaha	Yamaha YZF-R6	8	(Italy) Agostino Santoro	3
MG Competition	Yamaha	Yamaha YZF-R6	11	(France) Hugo Clere	All
VFT Racing	Yamaha	Yamaha YZF-R6	12	(Italy) Christopher Gobbi	All
GRADARACORSE Racing Team	Yamaha	Yamaha YZF-R6	14	(Italy) Massimiliano Spedale	All
Team Factory EWS	MV Agusta	MV Agusta F3 675	17	(Italy) Manuel Tatasciore	1–3
Team Factory EWS	MV Agusta	MV Agusta F3 675	75	(Italy) Francesco Cocco	5
Team Factory EWS	MV Agusta	MV Agusta F3 675	96	(Italy) Manuel Pagliani	1–3
Team Factory EWS	Yamaha	Yamaha YZF-R6	103	(Italy) Vincenzo Lagonigro	5
Kallio Racing	Yamaha	Yamaha YZF-R6	18	(Finland) Niki Tuuli	All
Kallio Racing	Yamaha	Yamaha YZF-R6	22	(Finland) Eemeli Lahti	All
MTM – HS Kawasaki	Kawasaki	Kawasaki ZX-6R	19	(Germany) Julian Puffe	1–2, 4–7
MTM – HS Kawasaki	Kawasaki	Kawasaki ZX-6R	26	(France) Guillaume Antiga	All
MTM – HS Kawasaki	Kawasaki	Kawasaki ZX-6R	47	(Netherlands) Rob Hartog	All
San Carlo Team Italia	Kawasaki	Kawasaki ZX-6R	21	(Italy) Michael Ruben Rinaldi	All
San Carlo Team Italia	Kawasaki	Kawasaki ZX-6R	44	(Italy) Andrea Tucci	All
Team Brazil by Aspi	Yamaha	Yamaha YZF-R6	28	(Brazil) Pedro Sampaio	All
MVR-Racing	Yamaha	Yamaha YZF-R6	29	(New Zealand) Jake Lewis	1–4, 6–7
MVR-Racing	Yamaha	Yamaha YZF-R6	51	(Netherlands) Bryan Schouten	4–7
MVR-Racing	Yamaha	Yamaha YZF-R6	52	(Belgium) Gauthier Duwelz	1–3
G.A.S. Racing Team	Kawasaki	Kawasaki ZX-6R	31	(Italy) Riccardo Caruso	All
G.A.S. Racing Team	Kawasaki	Kawasaki ZX-6R	70	(Italy) Luca Vitali	All
FLORAMO Monaco Racing Team	Honda	Honda CBR600RR	34	(Italy) Kevin Manfredi	1–4
FLORAMO Monaco Racing Team	Honda	Honda CBR600RR	61	(Italy) Alessandro Zaccone	5–7
PATA-Honda Junior Team	Honda	Honda CBR600RR	37	(Spain) Augusto Fernández	All
PATA-Honda Junior Team	Honda	Honda CBR600RR	64	(Italy) Federico Caricasulo	1–6
PATA-Honda Junior Team	Honda	Honda CBR600RR	65	(Italy) Michael Canducci	7
Agro-On WILsport Racedays	Honda	Honda CBR600RR	41	(France) Anthony Dumont	1–2
Agro-On WILsport Racedays	Honda	Honda CBR600RR	43	(New Zealand) Alastair Hoogenboezem	5–7
Agro-On WILsport Racedays	Honda	Honda CBR600RR	99	(United Kingdom) Joshua Harland	4
Agro-On WILsport Racedays	Honda	Honda CBR600RR	141	(Uruguay) Maximiliano Gerardo	All
Berclaz Racing Team	Kawasaki	Kawasaki ZX-6R	42	(Italy) Axel Bassani	6–7
Berclaz Racing Team	Kawasaki	Kawasaki ZX-6R	53	(Italy) Nicola Morrentino Jr.	1–5
Winteb Racing	Honda	Honda CBR600RR	45	(Netherlands) Bobby Bos	2
Kawasaki Puccetti Racing	Kawasaki	Kawasaki ZX-6R	54	(Turkey) Toprak Razgatlıoğlu	All
Team Go Eleven	Kawasaki	Kawasaki ZX-6R	55	(Ukraine) Ilya Mikhalchik	1–3
Team Go Eleven	Kawasaki	Kawasaki ZX-6R	68	(Germany) Ricarda Neubauer	All
Team Go Eleven	Kawasaki	Kawasaki ZX-6R	90	(Germany) Toni Finsterbusch	4–7
DS Racing Team; DS Junior Team	Kawasaki	Kawasaki ZX-6R	55	(Ukraine) Ilya Mikhalchik	5
DS Racing Team; DS Junior Team	Kawasaki	Kawasaki ZX-6R	55	(Ukraine) Ilya Mikhalchik	6–7
Verkeersschool Nobel Racing	Suzuki	Suzuki GSX-R600	57	(Netherlands) Chris Nobel	2
Team Target–FMP–Unixira	Yamaha	Yamaha YZF-R6	58	(Portugal) Pedro Barbosa	7
BCC Racing Team	Yamaha	Yamaha YZF-R6	59	(Switzerland) Roman Fischer	1–3, 5–6
Talmácsi Racing	Honda	Honda CBR600RR	61	(Italy) Alessandro Zaccone	1–3
Scuderia Maran.ga. Racing	Kawasaki	Kawasaki ZX-6R	63	(Italy) Davide Stirpe	All
Team MotoxRacing	Yamaha	Yamaha YZF-R6	69	(Italy) Rodolfo Oliva	3–7
Renzi Corse Srl SSD	Kawasaki	Kawasaki ZX-6R	74	(Italy) Gennaro Sabatino	5
NAZCA Racing Team	Yamaha	Yamaha YZF-R6	77	(Spain) Diego Carbó	1
Bike e Motor Racing Team	Yamaha	Yamaha YZF-R6	81	(Italy) Alex Bernardi	All
H-Moto Team	Yamaha	Yamaha YZF-R6	82	(Belgium) Livio Santorelli	6–7
H-Moto Team	Yamaha	Yamaha YZF-R6	91	(Spain) Aleix Aulestia	1–3, 5
Response RE Racing	Kawasaki	Kawasaki ZX-6R	83	(Australia) Lachlan Epis	All
SEFAB Racing Team	Honda	Honda CBR600RR	87	(Belgium) Angelo Licciardi	All
Autos Arroyo Pastrana Racing Team	Yamaha	Yamaha YZF-R6	85	(Spain) Abian Santana	6
Autos Arroyo Pastrana Racing Team	Yamaha	Yamaha YZF-R6	89	(Spain) Christian Palomares	1
MOUSS Racing Team	Yamaha	Yamaha YZF-R6	88	(France) Mathieu Marchal	1–3
Roberto Mercandelli Team	Yamaha	Yamaha YZF-R6	93	(Italy) Roberto Mercandelli	3
MSTeam	Kawasaki	Kawasaki ZX-6R	97	(Spain) Alexandre Sirerol	1–3, 6
Team Motorsport	Yamaha	Yamaha YZF-R6	121	(France) Yvan Laetzig	7
Moto Team 95 Events	Yamaha	Yamaha YZF-R6	194	(France) Alexandre Santo Domingues	7

Key
Regular rider
Wildcard rider
Replacement rider
