= Davide Stirpe =

Italian motorcycle racer

- Nationality: Italian
- Born: 1 August 1992 (age 34); Rome, Italy
- Current team: Extreme Racing Service
- Bike number: 63
Motorcycle racing career statistics
125cc World Championship
Active years	2008–2009
Manufacturers	KTM, Honda
Championships	0
2009 championship position	NC (0 pts)
Starts / Wins / Podiums / Poles / F. laps / Points; 2 / 0 / 0 / 0 / 0 / 0
Supersport World Championship
Active years	2016–2018, 2021
Manufacturers	Kawasaki, MV Agusta
Championships	0
2021 championship position	NC (0 pts)
Starts / Wins / Podiums / Poles / F. laps / Points; 12 / 0 / 0 / 0 / 0 / 6

Championship titles
- CIV Supersport Championship (2017, 2021, 2024); CIV Production Bike Championship (2025)

Davide Stirpe (born 1 August 1992) is an Italian motorcycle racer. He currently competes in the CIV Supersport 600 Championship aboard a MV Agusta F3 675.

Stirpe has competed at national level in the CIV 125GP championship, the Honda RS125 GP Trophy (where he was champion in 2009), the CIV Stock 600 Championship and the CIV Supersport Championship (where he was champion in 2017 and 2021), and at international level in the 125cc World Championship, the European Superstock 600 Championship and the Supersport World Championship.

In 2021, Stirpe joined the Extreme Racing Services and competed in Supersport World Championship.

== Career statistics ==
=== Career highlights ===
- 2014: 19th, European Superstock 600 Championship #63 Kawasaki ZX-6R
- 2015: 8th, European Superstock 600 Championship #63 Kawasaki ZX-6R
- 2021: 1st, CIV Supersport 600 #63 MV Agusta F3 675

=== FIM European Superstock 600 ===
==== Races by year ====
(key) (Races in bold indicate pole position, races in italics indicate fastest lap)

Year	Bike	1	2	3	4	5	6	7	8	Pos	Pts
2014	Kawasaki	SPA	NED	IMO	ITA; 3	POR	SPA	FRA		19th	16
2015	Kawasaki	SPA; 10	SPA; 11	NED; 13	ITA; Ret	POR; 15	ITA; 7	SPA; 3	FRA; 15	8th	41

=== Grand Prix motorcycle racing ===
==== By season ====
Season	Class	Motorcycle	Team	Race	Win	Podium	Pole	FLap	Pts	Plcd
2008	125cc	KTM	ISPA KTM Aran	1	0	0	0	0	0	NC
2009	125cc	Honda	CRP Racing	1	0	0	0	0	0	NC
Total				**2**	**0**	**0**	**0**	**0**	**0**	

==== Races by year ====
(key) (Races in bold indicate pole position; races in italics indicate fastest lap)

Year	Class	Bike	1	2	3	4	5	6	7	8	9	10	11	12	13	14	15	16	17	Pos.	Pts
2008	125cc	KTM	QAT	SPA	POR	CHN	FRA	ITA	CAT	GBR	NED	GER	CZE	RSM	INP; 27	JPN	AUS	MAL	VAL	NC	0
2009	125cc	Honda	QAT	JPN	SPA	FRA	ITA; 21	CAT	NED	GER	GBR	CZE	INP	RSM	POR	AUS	MAL	VAL		NC	0

=== Supersport World Championship ===
==== Races by year ====
(key) (Races in bold indicate pole position; races in italics indicate fastest lap)

Year	Bike	1	2	3	4	5	6	7	8	9	10	11	12	13	14	15	16	17	18	19	20	21	22	23	24	Pos.	Pts
2016	Kawasaki	AUS	THA	SPA; 19	NED; 23	ITA; 21	MAL	GBR; 27	ITA; 10	GER; 26	FRA; 26	SPA; 20	QAT													29th	6
2017	MV Agusta	AUS	THA	SPA	NED	ITA	GBR	ITA; Ret	GER	POR	FRA	SPA	QAT													NC	0
2018	MV Agusta	AUS	THA	SPA	NED	ITA; DNS	GBR	CZE	ITA; 16	POR	FRA	ARG	QAT													NC	0
2021	MV Agusta	SPA	SPA	POR	POR	ITA; 20	ITA; 16	NED	NED	CZE	CZE	SPA	SPA	FRA	FRA	SPA	SPA	SPA	SPA	POR	POR	ARG	ARG	INA	INA	NC	0

=== CIV National 600 ===
==== Races by year ====
(key) (Races in bold indicate pole position; races in italics indicate fastest lap)

Year	Bike	1		2		3		4		5		6		Pos	Pts
Year	Bike	R1	R2	R1	R2	R1	R2	R1	R2	R1	R2	R1	R2	Pos	Pts
2022	MV Agusta	MIS; 2	MIS; Ret	VAL; 9	VAL; 9	MUG; 9	MUG; 9	MIS2; 11	MIS2; 6	MUG2; Ret	MUG2; C	IMO; 9	IMO; 12	9th	61
