= 2008 San Marino and Rimini Riviera motorcycle Grand Prix =

2008 Motorcycle race

Coordinates: 43°57′40.9″N 12°41′0″E

2008 San Marino and Rimini Riviera Grand Prix
Race details
- Race 13 of 18 races in the 2008 Grand Prix motorcycle racing season
- Date: 31 August 2008
- Official name: Gran Premio Cinzano di San Marino e Della Riviera di Rimini
- Location: Misano World Circuit
- Course: Permanent racing facility; 4.226 km (2.626 mi)

MotoGP
Pole position
- Rider: (Australia) Casey Stoner
- Time: 1:33.378
Fastest lap
- Rider: (Italy) Valentino Rossi
- Time: 1:34.904
Podium
- First: (Italy) Valentino Rossi
- Second: (Spain) Jorge Lorenzo
- Third: (Spain) Toni Elías

250cc
Pole position
- Rider: (Spain) Héctor Barberá
- Time: 1:38.047
Fastest lap
- Rider: (Italy) Marco Simoncelli
- Time: 1:38.993
Podium
- First: (Spain) Álvaro Bautista
- Second: (Japan) Yuki Takahashi
- Third: (Spain) Héctor Barberá

125cc
Pole position
- Rider: (Hungary) Gábor Talmácsi
- Time: 1:43.729
Fastest lap
- Rider: (Hungary) Gábor Talmácsi
- Time: 1:43.839
Podium
- First: (Hungary) Gábor Talmácsi
- Second: (United Kingdom) Bradley Smith
- Third: (Italy) Simone Corsi

The 2008 San Marino and Rimini Riviera motorcycle Grand Prix was the thirteenth round of the 2008 MotoGP Championship. It took place on the weekend of 29–31 August 2008 at the Misano World Circuit.

== MotoGP classification ==
Pos.	No.	Rider	Team	Manufacturer	Laps	Time/Retired	Grid	Points
1	46	(Italy) Valentino Rossi	Fiat Yamaha Team	Yamaha	28	44:41.884	2	25
2	48	(Spain) Jorge Lorenzo	Fiat Yamaha Team	Yamaha	28	+3.163	3	20
3	24	(Spain) Toni Elías	Alice Team	Ducati	28	+11.705	5	16
4	2	(Spain) Dani Pedrosa	Repsol Honda Team	Honda	28	+17.470	6	13
5	7	(Australia) Chris Vermeulen	Rizla Suzuki MotoGP	Suzuki	28	+23.409	7	11
6	52	(United Kingdom) James Toseland	Tech 3 Yamaha	Yamaha	28	+26.208	9	10
7	65	(Italy) Loris Capirossi	Rizla Suzuki MotoGP	Suzuki	28	+26.824	11	9
8	4	(Italy) Andrea Dovizioso	JiR Team Scot MotoGP	Honda	28	+27.591	14	8
9	33	(Italy) Marco Melandri	Ducati Marlboro Team	Ducati	28	+33.169	15	7
10	5	(United States) Colin Edwards	Tech 3 Yamaha	Yamaha	28	+36.529	10	6
11	50	(France) Sylvain Guintoli	Alice Team	Ducati	28	+42.081	12	5
12	56	(Japan) Shinya Nakano	San Carlo Honda Gresini	Honda	28	+43.808	8	4
13	13	(Australia) Anthony West	Kawasaki Racing Team	Kawasaki	28	+54.874	18	3
14	21	(United States) John Hopkins	Kawasaki Racing Team	Kawasaki	28	+55.154	17	2
Ret	1	(Australia) Casey Stoner	Ducati Marlboro Team	Ducati	7	Accident	1	
Ret	15	(San Marino) Alex de Angelis	San Carlo Honda Gresini	Honda	1	Accident	13	
Ret	14	(France) Randy de Puniet	LCR Honda MotoGP	Honda	0	Accident	4	
DNS	69	(United States) Nicky Hayden	Repsol Honda Team	Honda	0	Did not start	16	

== 250 cc classification ==
Pos.	No.	Rider	Manufacturer	Laps	Time/Retired	Grid	Points
1	19	(Spain) Álvaro Bautista	Aprilia	26	43:15.831	11	25
2	72	(Japan) Yuki Takahashi	Honda	26	+2.088	4	20
3	21	(Spain) Héctor Barberá	Aprilia	26	+3.752	1	16
4	15	(Italy) Roberto Locatelli	Gilera	26	+7.472	14	13
5	60	(Spain) Julián Simón	KTM	26	+10.862	7	11
6	58	(Italy) Marco Simoncelli	Gilera	26	+21.180	2	10
7	12	(Switzerland) Thomas Lüthi	Aprilia	26	+29.440	6	9
8	14	(Thailand) Ratthapark Wilairot	Honda	26	+33.882	15	8
9	52	(Czech Republic) Lukáš Pešek	Aprilia	26	+35.051	13	7
10	17	(Czech Republic) Karel Abraham	Aprilia	26	+45.405	18	6
11	32	(Italy) Fabrizio Lai	Gilera	26	+47.260	16	5
12	90	(Italy) Federico Sandi	Aprilia	26	+1:10.664	20	4
13	43	(Spain) Manuel Hernández	Aprilia	26	+1:10.882	21	3
14	94	(Germany) Toni Wirsing	Honda	26	+1:33.332	22	2
15	35	(Italy) Simone Grotzkyj	Gilera	25	+1 lap	23	1
16	45	(Indonesia) Doni Tata Pradita	Yamaha	25	+1 lap	24	
Ret	41	(Spain) Aleix Espargaró	Aprilia	19	Retirement	3	
Ret	50	(Republic of Ireland) Eugene Laverty	Aprilia	14	Accident	17	
Ret	10	(Hungary) Imre Tóth	Aprilia	12	Retirement	25	
Ret	75	(Italy) Mattia Pasini	Aprilia	11	Accident	9	
Ret	4	(Japan) Hiroshi Aoyama	KTM	3	Accident	5	
Ret	36	(Finland) Mika Kallio	KTM	3	Accident	10	
Ret	55	(Spain) Héctor Faubel	Aprilia	2	Accident	8	
Ret	6	(Spain) Alex Debón	Aprilia	2	Accident	12	
Ret	25	(Italy) Alex Baldolini	Aprilia	1	Accident	19	
DNQ	93	(Hungary) Alen Győrfi	Honda		Did not qualify		
OFFICIAL 250cc REPORT

== 125 cc classification ==
Pos.	No.	Rider	Manufacturer	Laps	Time/Retired	Grid	Points
1	1	(Hungary) Gábor Talmácsi	Aprilia	23	40:03.679	1	25
2	38	(United Kingdom) Bradley Smith	Aprilia	23	+5.402	2	20
3	24	(Italy) Simone Corsi	Aprilia	23	+14.388	5	16
4	93	(Spain) Marc Márquez	KTM	23	+17.058	8	13
5	18	(Spain) Nicolás Terol	Aprilia	23	+17.321	9	11
6	29	(Italy) Andrea Iannone	Aprilia	23	+17.482	13	10
7	11	(Germany) Sandro Cortese	Aprilia	23	+17.485	7	9
8	77	(Switzerland) Dominique Aegerter	Derbi	23	+18.657	14	8
9	12	(Spain) Esteve Rabat	KTM	23	+19.148	19	7
10	33	(Spain) Sergio Gadea	Aprilia	23	+34.650	12	6
11	7	(Spain) Efrén Vázquez	Aprilia	23	+34.855	18	5
12	6	(Spain) Joan Olivé	Derbi	23	+39.394	10	4
13	60	(Austria) Michael Ranseder	Aprilia	23	+47.304	21	3
14	99	(United Kingdom) Danny Webb	Aprilia	23	+53.241	20	2
15	94	(Germany) Jonas Folger	KTM	23	+53.349	28	1
16	16	(France) Jules Cluzel	Loncin	23	+1:01.903	24	
17	72	(Italy) Marco Ravaioli	Aprilia	23	+1:04.165	32	
18	71	(Japan) Tomoyoshi Koyama	KTM	23	+1:06.235	22	
19	73	(Japan) Takaaki Nakagami	Aprilia	23	+1:06.260	25	
20	21	(Germany) Robin Lässer	Aprilia	23	+1:07.200	27	
21	43	(Italy) Gabriele Ferro	Honda	23	+1:21.814	31	
22	48	(Switzerland) Bastien Chesaux	Aprilia	23	+1:22.521	38	
23	69	(France) Louis Rossi	Honda	23	+1:35.247	33	
24	56	(Netherlands) Hugo van den Berg	Aprilia	23	+1:39.723	39	
25	42	(Italy) Luca Vitali	Aprilia	22	+1 lap	36	
26	34	(Switzerland) Randy Krummenacher	KTM	21	+2 laps	37	
Ret	63	(France) Mike Di Meglio	Derbi	14	Accident	6	
Ret	17	(Germany) Stefan Bradl	Aprilia	14	Retirement	11	
Ret	8	(Italy) Lorenzo Zanetti	KTM	14	Retirement	26	
Ret	44	(Spain) Pol Espargaró	Derbi	12	Retirement	3	
Ret	40	(Italy) Lorenzo Savadori	Aprilia	12	Retirement	23	
Ret	35	(Italy) Raffaele De Rosa	KTM	10	Retirement	15	
Ret	5	(France) Alexis Masbou	Loncin	6	Retirement	29	
Ret	49	(Italy) Gennaro Sabatino	Aprilia	6	Retirement	30	
Ret	22	(Spain) Pablo Nieto	KTM	4	Retirement	34	
Ret	51	(United States) Stevie Bonsey	Aprilia	3	Retirement	17	
Ret	45	(United Kingdom) Scott Redding	Aprilia	1	Accident	4	
Ret	26	(Spain) Adrián Martín	Aprilia	0	Retirement	35	
Ret	47	(Italy) Riccardo Moretti	Honda	0	Accident	16	
OFFICIAL 125cc REPORT

== Championship standings after the race (MotoGP) ==
Below are the standings for the top five riders and constructors after round thirteen has concluded.

Riders' Championship standings

Pos.	Rider	Points
1	(Italy) Valentino Rossi	262
2	(Australia) Casey Stoner	187
3	(Spain) Dani Pedrosa	185
4	(Spain) Jorge Lorenzo	140
5	(Italy) Andrea Dovizioso	118

Constructors' Championship standings

Pos.	Constructor	Points
1	(Japan) Yamaha	291
2	(Italy) Ducati	228
3	(Japan) Honda	223
4	(Japan) Suzuki	139
5	(Japan) Kawasaki	66

- Note: Only the top five positions are included for both sets of standings.

Previous race: 2008 Czech Republic Grand Prix	FIM Grand Prix World Championship; 2008 season	Next race: 2008 Indianapolis Grand Prix
Previous race: 2007 San Marino Grand Prix	San Marino and Rimini Riviera motorcycle Grand Prix	Next race: 2009 San Marino Grand Prix
