= 2009 Italian motorcycle Grand Prix =

(Italy) 2009 Italian Grand Prix
Race details
- Race 5 of 17 races in the 2009 Grand Prix motorcycle racing season
- Date: 31 May 2009
- Official name: Gran Premio d'Italia Alice
- Location: Autodromo Internazionale del Mugello
- Course: Permanent racing facility; 5.245 km (3.259 mi)

MotoGP
Pole position
- Rider: (Spain) Jorge Lorenzo
- Time: 1:48.987
Fastest lap
- Rider: (Italy) Valentino Rossi
- Time: 1:51.186
Podium
- First: (Australia) Casey Stoner
- Second: (Spain) Jorge Lorenzo
- Third: (Italy) Valentino Rossi

250cc
Pole position
- Rider: (Spain) Álvaro Bautista
- Time: 1:52.804
Fastest lap
- Rider: (Italy) Marco Simoncelli
- Time: 2:05.830
Podium
- First: (Italy) Mattia Pasini
- Second: (Italy) Marco Simoncelli
- Third: (Spain) Álvaro Bautista

125cc
Pole position
- Rider: (United Kingdom) Bradley Smith
- Time: 1:58.134
Fastest lap
- Rider: (Spain) Julián Simón
- Time: 1:58.744
Podium
- First: (United Kingdom) Bradley Smith
- Second: (Spain) Nicolás Terol
- Third: (Spain) Julián Simón

The 2009 Italian motorcycle Grand Prix was the fifth round of the 2009 Grand Prix motorcycle racing season. It took place on the weekend of 29–31 May 2009 at the Mugello Circuit. The Moto GP race was won by Casey Stoner with Jorge Lorenzo second and Valentino Rossi in third place. This broke Rossi's sequence of seven consecutive victories at this event. During the weekend, Dani Pedrosa recorded the fastest speed ever for a motorcycle grand prix bike, with 349.3 km/h (217.0 mph) breaking Makoto Tamada's record of 343.7 km/h (213.6 mph) set in 2006. Mika Kallio and Rossi also recorded speeds above the previous benchmark.

== MotoGP classification ==
Pos.	No.	Rider	Team	Manufacturer	Laps	Time/Retired	Grid	Points
1	27	(Australia) Casey Stoner	Ducati Marlboro Team	Ducati	23	45:41.894	2	25
2	99	(Spain) Jorge Lorenzo	Fiat Yamaha Team	Yamaha	23	+1.001	1	20
3	46	(Italy) Valentino Rossi	Fiat Yamaha Team	Yamaha	23	+2.076	4	16
4	4	(Italy) Andrea Dovizioso	Repsol Honda Team	Honda	23	+2.129	7	13
5	65	(Italy) Loris Capirossi	Rizla Suzuki MotoGP	Suzuki	23	+3.274	3	11
6	5	(United States) Colin Edwards	Monster Yamaha Tech 3	Yamaha	23	+24.451	6	10
7	52	(United Kingdom) James Toseland	Monster Yamaha Tech 3	Yamaha	23	+25.621	14	9
8	14	(France) Randy de Puniet	LCR Honda MotoGP	Honda	23	+26.046	5	8
9	88	(Italy) Niccolò Canepa	Pramac Racing	Ducati	23	+31.815	13	7
10	7	(Australia) Chris Vermeulen	Rizla Suzuki MotoGP	Suzuki	23	+34.814	11	6
11	33	(Italy) Marco Melandri	Hayate Racing Team	Kawasaki	23	+35.090	15	5
12	69	(United States) Nicky Hayden	Ducati Marlboro Team	Ducati	23	+39.122	16	4
13	36	(Finland) Mika Kallio	Pramac Racing	Ducati	23	+52.462	17	3
14	24	(Spain) Toni Elías	San Carlo Honda Gresini	Honda	23	+52.478	9	2
15	15	(San Marino) Alex de Angelis	San Carlo Honda Gresini	Honda	22	+1 lap	12	1
Ret	3	(Spain) Dani Pedrosa	Repsol Honda Team	Honda	12	Accident	8	
Ret	72	(Japan) Yuki Takahashi	Scot Racing Team MotoGP	Honda	10	Accident	10	

== 250 cc classification ==
Pos.	No.	Rider	Manufacturer	Laps	Time/Retired	Grid	Points
1	75	(Italy) Mattia Pasini	Aprilia	21	45:38.391	8	25
2	58	(Italy) Marco Simoncelli	Gilera	21	+0.117	2	20
3	19	(Spain) Álvaro Bautista	Aprilia	21	+1.293	1	16
4	12	(Switzerland) Thomas Lüthi	Aprilia	21	+24.557	6	13
5	40	(Spain) Héctor Barberá	Aprilia	21	+27.014	3	11
6	4	(Japan) Hiroshi Aoyama	Honda	21	+30.037	4	10
7	6	(Spain) Alex Debón	Aprilia	21	+31.325	5	9
8	55	(Spain) Héctor Faubel	Honda	21	+35.178	13	8
9	35	(Italy) Raffaele De Rosa	Honda	21	+44.856	9	7
10	15	(Italy) Roberto Locatelli	Gilera	21	+46.483	10	6
11	25	(Italy) Alex Baldolini	Aprilia	21	+49.521	17	5
12	63	(France) Mike Di Meglio	Aprilia	21	+1:00.539	14	4
13	17	(Czech Republic) Karel Abraham	Aprilia	21	+1:23.730	11	3
14	14	(Thailand) Ratthapark Wilairot	Honda	21	+1:25.519	7	2
15	10	(Hungary) Imre Tóth	Aprilia	21	+1:30.397	18	1
16	11	(Hungary) Balázs Németh	Aprilia	20	+1 lap	22	
17	7	(Spain) Axel Pons	Aprilia	20	+1 lap	18	
18	8	(Switzerland) Bastien Chesaux	Honda	20	+1 lap	24	
19	53	(France) Valentin Debise	Honda	20	+1 lap	20	
20	37	(Spain) Daniel Arcas	Aprilia	18	+3 laps	23	
Ret	48	(Japan) Shoya Tomizawa	Honda	6	Accident	16	
Ret	52	(Czech Republic) Lukáš Pešek	Aprilia	5	Accident	15	
Ret	56	(Russia) Vladimir Leonov	Aprilia	4	Retirement	21	
Ret	16	(France) Jules Cluzel	Aprilia	0	Accident	12	
OFFICIAL 250cc REPORT

== 125 cc classification ==
Pos.	No.	Rider	Manufacturer	Laps	Time/Retired	Grid	Points
1	38	(United Kingdom) Bradley Smith	Aprilia	20	40:09.523	1	25
2	18	(Spain) Nicolás Terol	Aprilia	20	+0.216	12	20
3	60	(Spain) Julián Simón	Aprilia	20	+7.114	3	16
4	44	(Spain) Pol Espargaró	Derbi	20	+11.829	8	13
5	93	(Spain) Marc Márquez	KTM	20	+12.315	5	11
6	14	(France) Johann Zarco	Aprilia	20	+14.605	7	10
7	45	(United Kingdom) Scott Redding	Aprilia	20	+15.305	2	9
8	17	(Germany) Stefan Bradl	Aprilia	20	+22.255	19	8
9	32	(Italy) Lorenzo Savadori	Aprilia	20	+22.392	20	7
10	11	(Germany) Sandro Cortese	Derbi	20	+29.239	9	6
11	33	(Spain) Sergio Gadea	Aprilia	20	+36.359	4	5
12	8	(Italy) Lorenzo Zanetti	Aprilia	20	+36.444	16	4
13	35	(Switzerland) Randy Krummenacher	Aprilia	20	+36.507	13	3
14	94	(Germany) Jonas Folger	Aprilia	20	+36.581	23	2
15	73	(Japan) Takaaki Nakagami	Aprilia	20	+36.636	22	1
16	12	(Spain) Esteve Rabat	Aprilia	20	+36.834	14	
17	61	(Italy) Luigi Morciano	Aprilia	20	+49.870	24	
18	24	(Italy) Simone Corsi	Aprilia	20	+50.419	11	
19	77	(Switzerland) Dominique Aegerter	Derbi	20	+1:05.900	18	
20	51	(Italy) Riccardo Moretti	Aprilia	20	+1:06.019	21	
21	64	(Italy) Davide Stirpe	Honda	20	+1:20.225	26	
22	69	(Czech Republic) Lukáš Šembera	Aprilia	20	+1:21.946	25	
23	53	(Netherlands) Jasper Iwema	Honda	20	+1:43.074	30	
24	63	(Italy) Gennaro Sabatino	Aprilia	19	+1 lap	29	
25	10	(Italy) Luca Vitali	Aprilia	19	+1 lap	33	
26	62	(Italy) Alessandro Tonucci	Aprilia	19	+1 lap	27	
Ret	87	(Italy) Luca Marconi	Aprilia	12	Retirement	32	
Ret	99	(United Kingdom) Danny Webb	Aprilia	8	Accident	10	
Ret	29	(Italy) Andrea Iannone	Aprilia	5	Retirement	6	
Ret	6	(Spain) Joan Olivé	Derbi	5	Accident	17	
Ret	7	(Spain) Efrén Vázquez	Derbi	5	Accident	15	
Ret	71	(Japan) Tomoyoshi Koyama	Loncin	2	Retirement	28	
Ret	5	(France) Alexis Masbou	Loncin	1	Retirement	31	
DNQ	5	(United States) Cameron Beaubier	KTM		Did not qualify		
OFFICIAL 125cc REPORT

== Championship standings after the race (MotoGP) ==
Below are the standings for the top five riders and constructors after round five has concluded.

Riders' Championship standings

Pos.	Rider	Points
1	(Australia) Casey Stoner	90
2	(Spain) Jorge Lorenzo	86
3	(Italy) Valentino Rossi	81
4	(Spain) Dani Pedrosa	57
5	(Italy) Andrea Dovizioso	56

Constructors' Championship standings

Pos.	Constructor	Points
1	(Japan) Yamaha	115
2	(Italy) Ducati	90
3	(Japan) Honda	76
4	(Japan) Suzuki	49
5	(Japan) Kawasaki	48

- Note: Only the top five positions are included for both sets of standings.

Previous race: 2009 French Grand Prix	FIM Grand Prix World Championship; 2009 season	Next race: 2009 Catalan Grand Prix
Previous race: 2008 Italian Grand Prix	Italian motorcycle Grand Prix	Next race: 2010 Italian Grand Prix
