= Manuel Tatasciore =

Italian motorcycle racer

- Nationality: Italian
- Born: 17 April 1994 (age 32); Lanciano, Italy
Motorcycle racing career statistics
Moto3 World Championship
Active years	2012
Manufacturers	Honda
Championships	0
2012 championship position	NC (0 pts)
Starts / Wins / Podiums / Poles / F. laps / Points; 1 / 0 / 0 / 0 / 0 / 0
125cc World Championship
Active years	2011
Manufacturers	Aprilia
Championships	0
2011 championship position	27th (5 pts)
Starts / Wins / Podiums / Poles / F. laps / Points; 6 / 0 / 0 / 0 / 0 / 5

Manuel Tatasciore (born 17 April 1994) is an Italian motorcycle racer from Abruzzo. In 2010, at the age of 16, he won the title at the Coppa Italia 125 SP.

== Career statistics ==
- 2013 - 21st, European Superstock 600 Championship, Yamaha YZF-R6
- 2015 - NC, European Superstock 600 Championship #17, MV Agusta F3 675

=== Grand Prix motorcycle racing ===
==== By season ====
Season	Class	Motorcycle	Team	Number	Race	Win	Podium	Pole	FLap	Pts	Plcd
2011	125cc	Aprilia	Phonica Racing	60	6	0	0	0	0	5	27th
2012	Moto3	Honda	Caretta Technology	73	1	0	0	0	0	0	NC
Total					**7**	**0**	**0**	**0**	**0**	**5**	

==== Races by year ====
(key)

Year	Class	Bike	1	2	3	4	5	6	7	8	9	10	11	12	13	14	15	16	17	Pos.	Pts
2011	125cc	Aprilia	QAT	SPA	POR	FRA	CAT	GBR	NED	ITA	GER	CZE; Ret	INP	RSM; 18	ARA; 17	JPN	AUS; 19	MAL; 22	VAL; 11	27th	5
2012	Moto3	Honda	QAT	SPA	POR; 22	FRA	CAT	GBR	NED	GER	ITA	INP	CZE	RSM	ARA	JPN	MAL	AUS	VAL	NC	0

=== FIM European Superstock 600 ===
==== Races by year ====
(key) (Races in bold indicate pole position, races in italics indicate fastest lap)

Year	Bike	1	2	3	4	5	6	7	8	9	10	Pos	Pts
2013	Yamaha	ARA	ASS	MNZ; 3	POR; 18	IMO; 23	SIL1	SIL2	NÜR	MAG	JER	21st	16
2015	MV Agusta	SPA; 26	SPA; 24	NED; 24	ITA; Ret	POR	ITA	SPA	FRA			NC	0
