= 2008 Indianapolis motorcycle Grand Prix =

2008 Indianapolis Grand Prix
Race details
- Race 14 of 18 races in the 2008 Grand Prix motorcycle racing season
- Date: September 14, 2008
- Official name: Red Bull Indianapolis Grand Prix
- Location: Indianapolis Motor Speedway
- Course: Permanent racing facility; 4.216 km (2.620 mi)

MotoGP
Pole position
- Rider: (Italy) Valentino Rossi
- Time: 1:40.776
Fastest lap
- Rider: (Italy) Valentino Rossi
- Time: 1:49.668
Podium
- First: (Italy) Valentino Rossi
- Second: (United States) Nicky Hayden
- Third: (Spain) Jorge Lorenzo

250cc
Pole position
- Rider: (Italy) Marco Simoncelli
- Time: 1:45.168
Fastest lap
- Rider: Race cancelled
Podium
- First: Race cancelled
- Second: Race cancelled
- Third: Race cancelled

125cc
Pole position
- Rider: (Spain) Pol Espargaró
- Time: 1:50.475
Fastest lap
- Rider: (Germany) Stefan Bradl
- Time: 1:50.460
Podium
- First: (Spain) Nicolás Terol
- Second: (Spain) Pol Espargaró
- Third: (Germany) Stefan Bradl

The 2008 Indianapolis motorcycle Grand Prix was the fourteenth round of the 2008 MotoGP Championship. It took place on the weekend of September 12–14, 2008 at the Indianapolis Motor Speedway – the first time the circuit has hosted a major motorcycle racing event since its first year of operation in 1909. As there was a United States Grand Prix at Mazda Raceway Laguna Seca earlier in the season, this marks the championship's second visit to the United States in 2008, the first time this has ever happened. Unlike the Laguna Seca round, the meeting features the supporting 125cc and 250cc classes, marking their first visit to North America since 1994.

The layout of the circuit is similar to the setup used for the United States Grand Prix Formula One events at the circuit between 2000 and 2007, but not identical. It has been reversed to a counterclockwise layout, with a new Snake Pit complex just after the start-finish line, meaning that the bikes do not use any of the banked oval corners. The double-hairpin at the Hulman Straight was replaced with a traditional esses.

The event was heavily affected by the arrival of the remnants of Hurricane Ike on Indiana; the race day the weather was overcast and cold, with a 100% chance of rain during the event. The 125cc class started with dry track however, and went on until rain began to fall, with 7 laps to go. However, since two-thirds of the scheduled distance had been run, the race was declared over and full points were given. The intensity of the rain then led the organizers to postpone the 250cc race after the MotoGP race, hoping the winds and rain would stop.

== MotoGP race report ==
This race was most notable for the unique conditions in which the race took place in, namely the effects of Hurricane Ike in Indiana and the eventual red flagging of the event because of it, as well as Nicky Hayden's podium on home soil.

After thirteen rounds, Valentino Rossi was securing his eighth title ever more with a lead of 262 points, followed by Casey Stoner in second with 187 and Dani Pedrosa with 185 points in third.

MotoGP arrives to a new venue for modern standards: The Indianapolis Motor Speedway. The venue, used last year to host the 2007 United States Grand Prix for Formula 1 has undergone some changes and the first sector (the last sector for F1) has been completely revamped. New corners were made and new asphalt is put on the whole first sector, making that area less grippy than the old, unchanged second and third sector of the circuit.

Valentino Rossi grabbed his second and finale pole of the season on Saturday with a time of 1:40.776. In second is Casey Stoner with 1:40.860, +0.084 seconds slower than him. Third is Rossi's rookie Yamaha teammate Jorge Lorenzo with 1:41.177, +0.317 seconds slower. The second row of the grid consists out of home heroes Nicky Hayden and Ben Spies in fourth and fifth, and surprise qualifier Randy de Puniet in sixth place.

While the earlier 125cc race was affected due to Hurricane Ike, this race looked to start from a regular time slot without any significant problems. The circuit was still very wet but the rain had stopped and the wind had eased. The track had also been modified at the beginning and offered less grip in this region, but was not changed in the second and third sectors, offering more grip for the riders there. Because of the conditions, all riders start with mandated full-wet tyres.

All riders take off and do their usual warm-up lap before lining up in their respective grid slots. As the lights go out, it is Stoner who manages to take over heading into Turn 1. Hayden also managed to pass three other riders and move right up into third. Rookie Andrea Dovizioso manages to pass a lot of people around the outside from his grid slot to get himself up into third place. The person losing out the most is Rossi, who has a slow getaway and drops to fourth on the opening lap, with Lorenzo losing out several places as well. By Turn 4, Lorenzo lost out to Pedrosa and had to be satisfied with sixth for the time being. At Turn 6, Hayden goes a bit wide and Dovizioso dives down his inside to snatch second from him. Immediately after however, he also directly goes up the inside of Stoner at Turn 7 and takes the lead. He then tries to open a gap as Lorenzo overtakes Pedrosa via his inside at the entrance of Turn 10 for fifth spot. Hayden takes second place from Stoner by going up his inside at Turn 12.

On lap two, Stoner is already visibly struggling through the corners as Rossi is all over him. At Turn 6, Spies fancies a look at Pedrosa via the outside, the Spaniard denying him entry. Lorenzo then lines up a move by taking a wider line at the tight Turn 7 kink, then passing his teammate via the outside, promoting himself up to fourth place. By now, Dovizioso and Hayden have opened up a significant gap to third place Stoner. He then also overtakes the Australian and immediately opens up a gap to chase down the leaders.

Lap three and Hayden now takes the lead from Dovizioso around the outside at the start/finish straight before Turn 1. Rossi takes fourth from Stoner by diving down his inside at Turn 2. This allows both Lorenzo and Rossi to slowly start catching the two frontrunners. At Turn 10, Spies overtakes Pedrosa and goes up into sixth position.

On lap four, Rossi takes third by going up the inside of Lorenzo at Turn 2. He then pulls a slight gap to his teammate and starts closing in on Dovizioso, who himself starts to lose touch with leader Hayden.

Lap five and Rossi has set the fastest lap of the race. He has now fully closed up to Dovizioso and is harassing him all throughout the lap.

As Hayden crosses the line to start lap six, Rossi closes up a lot to Dovizioso and thinks about making a move entering Turn 1 but stays behind for the time being. At Turn 2, Rossi tries a very late lunge to overtake Dovizioso but runs wide, allowing the JiR Team Scot Honda rider to retake the position upon entry. At Turn 15, he tries again and this time manages to close the door just in time to prevent Dovizioso to come back at him, moving him up to second place.

On lap seven, Hayden sets the fastest lap of the race. A bit further back, Lorenzo's gap to Stoner is +1.792 seconds and his gap to Spies is +1.331 seconds back. Hayden's gap to Rossi on the last lap was +0.900 seconds. In sector one, this gap increases slightly to +0.907 seconds. The gap increases again slightly in sector two to +0.925 seconds, then the gap decreases at sector three to +0.519 seconds.

As Hayden crosses the line and begins lap eight, the gap he has to Rossi is now only +0.305 seconds. Rossi then shadows Hayden all throughout the lap.

Lap eight and Lorenzo has passed Dovizioso at the start/finish straight for third. Rossi has also set the fastest lap of the race. After overtaking Dovizioso, he starts opening up a small gap as Stoner starts to close up on the Italian himself. At Turn 10, Rossi runs a bit wide on entry, giving Hayden a bit of breathing room.

On lap nine, it is Hayden who sets the fastest lap. Stoner has closed the gap to Dovizioso but has not been able to get past so far, neither is Rossi on Hayden.

Lap ten and the top six is as follows: Hayden, Rossi, Lorenzo, Dovizioso, Stoner and Spies. No overtakes happen on this lap.

On lap eleven - the halfway point of the shortened race - Hayden sets another fastest lap. Rossi closes up a lot through the last sector but still does not overtake.

Lap twelve and Rossi now sets the fastest lap. At Turn 5, Hayden runs wide but does not lose any time or positions because of it. At Turn 15, Rossi has a look at Hayden's inside but decides to stay behind for the time being.

On lap thirteen, Rossi finally makes his move by exiting Turn 9 right behind the American, then going up his inside and outbraking him entering Turn 10 to take over the lead. Once passed, Rossi starts opening up a gap to Hayden.

Lap fourteen and Rossi has now opened up an even bigger gap. No overtakes happened.

On lap fifteen, Rossi sets the fastest lap of the race. Hayden is now really struggling, the differences between Rossi's Bridgestone and Hayden's Michelin tyres ever more obvious by now. Stoner has also passed Dovizioso for fourth spot as well, with Spies closing in on both of the riders. Further behind, Sylvain Guintoli has caught a struggling Pedrosa for seventh place. Rossi's gap to Hayden on the last lap was +1.263 seconds, which increased to +1.522 seconds in sector one and +1.802 seconds in sector two. In sector three, the gap diminished slightly to +1.793 seconds.

Lap sixteen and the rain has started to fall again. Rossi's gap to Hayden has decreased to +1.542 seconds now. Hayden's gap to third place Lorenzo in turn is +6.834 seconds and his gap back to Stoner is a massive +10.240 seconds. At Turn 7, Dovizioso uses the sudden increase in wind and rain to get closer to a struggling Stoner and go up his inside to take fourth place. Rossi has a big moment as he gets on the white line and loses all grip in his rear tyre exiting Turn 9.

On lap seventeen, the rain intensifies and visibility becomes worse for the riders. Spies uses this to his advantage, closeing the gap to Stoner and is now right behind him. At the straight before Turn 10, the strong wind is starting to blow debris onto the track, making it more dangerous for the riders.

Lap eighteen and Rossi's gap to Hayden is now +1.004 seconds. Hayden's gap back to Lorenzo is +6.935 seconds and Lorenzo's gap to Dovizioso a huge +16.343 seconds. Stoner meanwhile has shaken off the threat of Spies and is now back on Dovizioso's tail, trying to find a way past. By now, Guintoli has also passed Pedrosa for seventh. In the back, John Hopkins has right behind Randy de Puniet for thirteenth. At Turn 10, Stoner makes a brave move by diving down the inside of Dovizioso to take back fourth position from him. Rossi's gap to Hayden has increased in sector one to +1.430 seconds, then again to +2.573 seconds in sector two. In sector three, the gap increases once more to +2.892 seconds.

On lap nineteen, the visibility has worsened even more. Rossi's gap to Hayden is now +2.996 seconds. Both Rossi and Hayden are now having little moments all over the circuit, trying to stay on.

Lap twenty, the penultimate lap before the race was red flagged, starts with Hayden, now badly struggling in the conditions and with his tyres, being caught rapidly by a late charge from Lorenzo in third. Exiting Turn 9, both riders have a small moment but stay on their bikes. Lorenzo by now is right behind the American but has not yet passed him.

The final lap before the race was red flagged - lap twenty-one - begins and Lorenzo tries to make a move at the fast left-handed Turn 1 but thinks better of it and stays behind for now. The circuit is now extremely wet and the wind has picked up as well, making the conditions dangerous to race in. Halfway into the lap, the marshalls bring out the red flag, immediately stopping the race and freezing all positions as they stand from lap twenty.

All the riders cruise back to the pits and both Rossi and Lorenzo wave at them as they exit Turn 16, them cheering in return. As Rossi arrives, he steps off his bike and hugs his crew, believing that the race will not be started again due to the dangerous conditions. As all the riders wait for the decision from race control whether or not the race will continue, riders like Hayden get interviewed by American sporting press.

As time passes, the rain has stopped and the weather looks to be cleared up but the wind had only worsened, even blowing the cushions who are placed on the circuit for protection off their place, making the conditions still too dangerous. Some already start preparing the bikes to go out again, believing that the will continue.

Rossi, probably having enough of the waiting an uncertainty, goes to Dorna's CEO to have a talk with him himself, followed by the racing press. As they speak, a Yamaha banner has collapsed from the strong winds. Minor booing can be heard from the crowd as Stoner joins in to say that they both don't want to go out again in these conditions. Rossi then talks to Italian television about his discussion.

After a long wait, it is then confirmed that the race will not be restarted and that Rossi has won it, sending the Fiat Yamaha and Repsol Honda pit box into festivities upon hearing the news.

After the solidication of the standings, Rossi still talks to Italian television as the others prepare themselves for the upcoming podium ceremony. By now, the remaining 250cc race - which was scheduled to run after this one - was cancelled due to the strong winds, making racing too dangerous.

All the podium finishers eventually start walking to the podium, Hayden being helped because he still suffers from an earlier heel injury he sustained a few weeks ago and had to miss two rounds because of it.

All the riders go onto the podium and receive their respective trophies after a delay, the crowd cheerling loudly for Hayden as he receives his. The Italian national anthem plays for Rossi and as it stops, the podium girls hand everyone the champagne. Upon receiving it, Rossi cheekily sprays one of the girls standing by, then sprays the crowd and the others. The three toast and pose for the photo as the crowd cheers on.

Rossi's victory now means his grip on the world championship title has been secured even further, already having the chance to be crowned the 2008 MotoGP world champion at the next round in Japan. All riders receive full world championship points, thus Rossi increases his lead to 287 points, 87 points ahead of second place Stoner with 200 and third place Pedrosa with 193 points.

== MotoGP classification ==
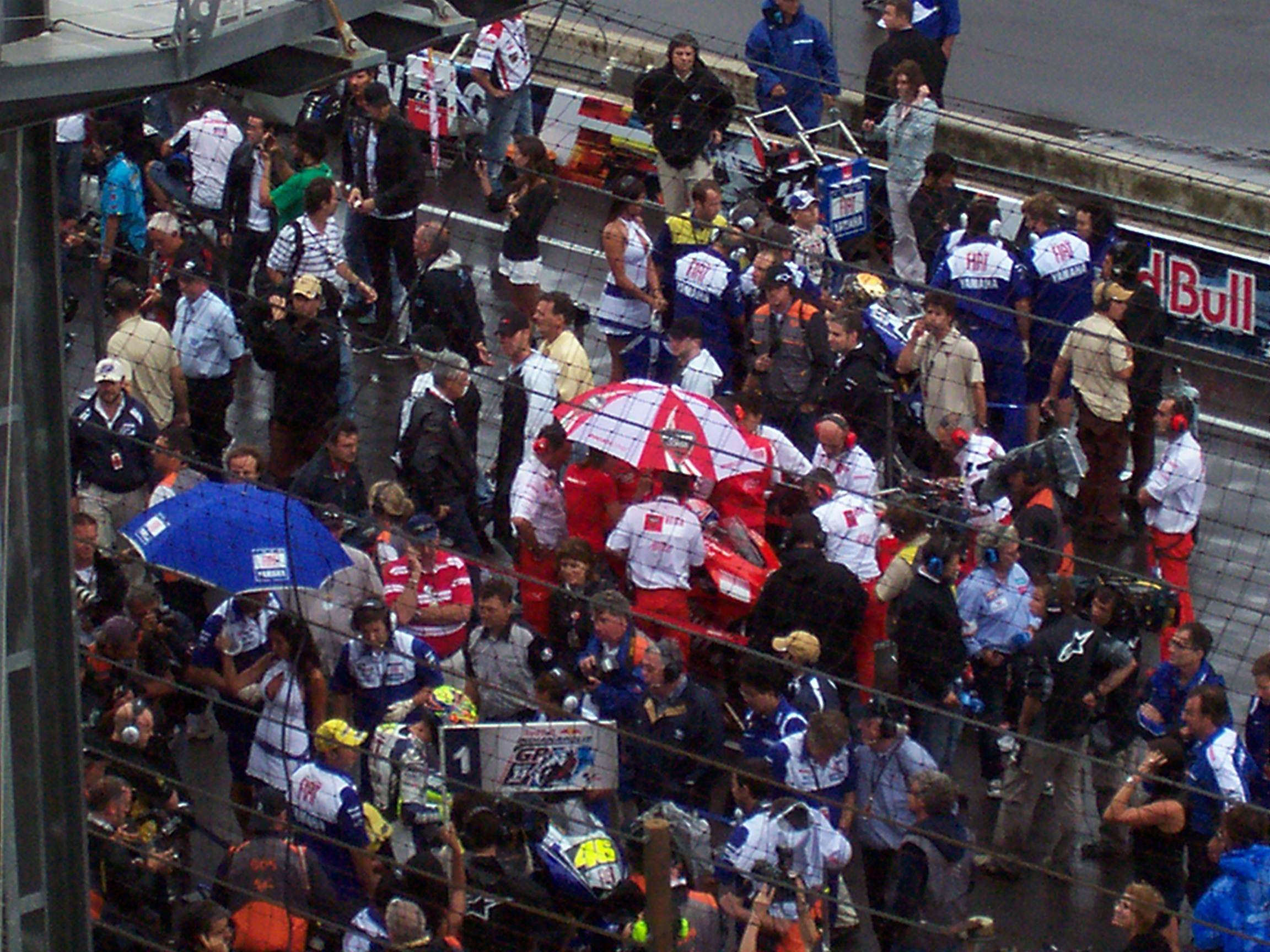
The front row for the MotoGP class. From bottom to top, pole sitter Valentino Rossi, 2nd place starter Casey Stoner, and 3rd place starter Jorge Lorenzo.

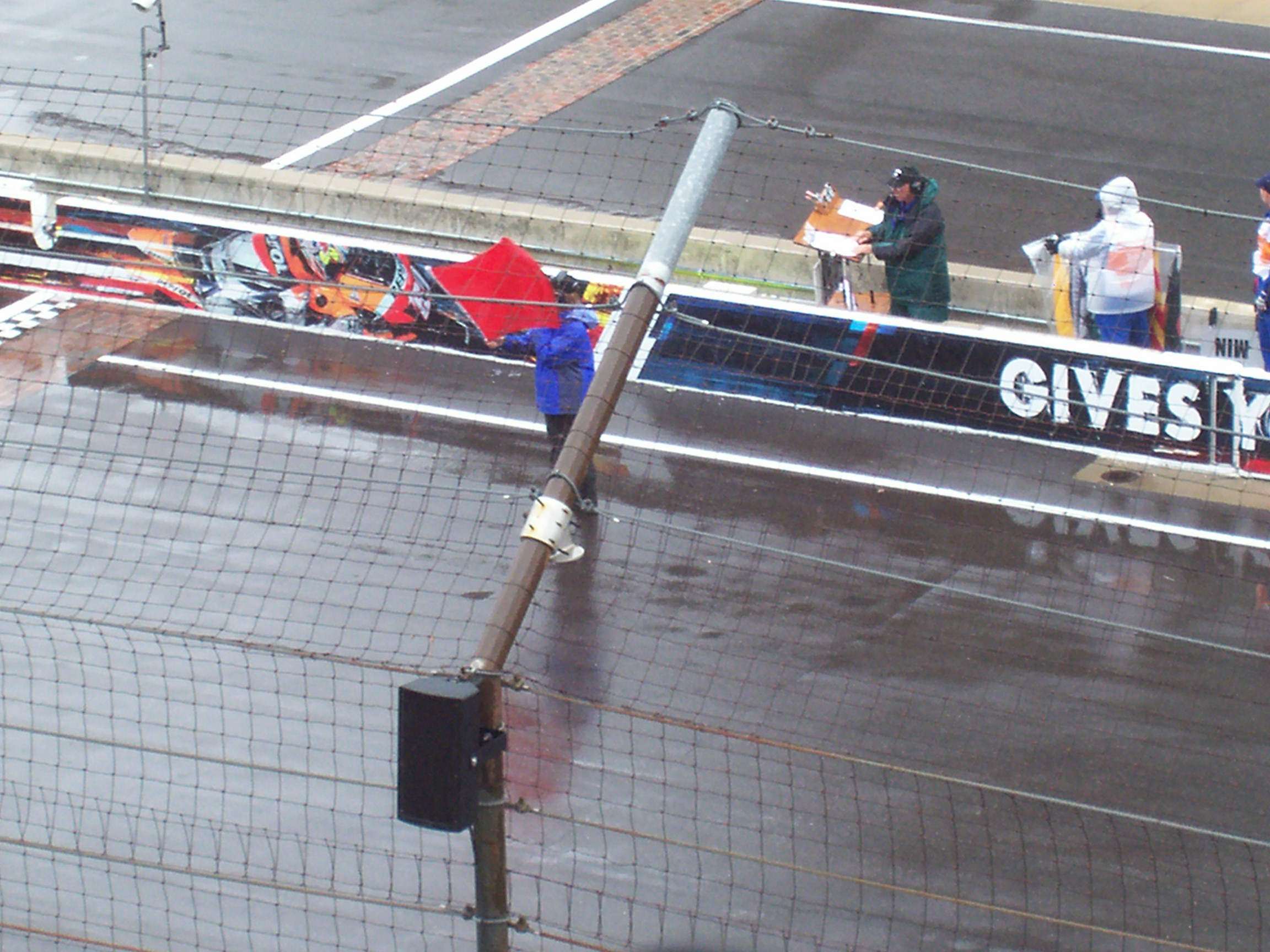
The red flag is displayed at lap 21.

| Pos. | No. | Rider | Team | Manufacturer | Laps | Time/Retired | Grid | Points |
|---|---|---|---|---|---|---|---|---|
| 1 | 46 | (Italy) Valentino Rossi | Fiat Yamaha Team | Yamaha | 20 | 37:20.095 | 1 | 25 |
| 2 | 69 | (United States) Nicky Hayden | Repsol Honda Team | Honda | 20 | +5.972 | 4 | 20 |
| 3 | 48 | (Spain) Jorge Lorenzo | Fiat Yamaha Team | Yamaha | 20 | +7.858 | 3 | 16 |
| 4 | 1 | (Australia) Casey Stoner | Ducati Team | Ducati | 20 | +28.162 | 2 | 13 |
| 5 | 4 | (Italy) Andrea Dovizioso | JiR Team Scot MotoGP | Honda | 20 | +28.824 | 7 | 11 |
| 6 | 11 | (United States) Ben Spies | Rizla Suzuki MotoGP | Suzuki | 20 | +29.645 | 5 | 10 |
| 7 | 50 | (France) Sylvain Guintoli | Alice Team | Ducati | 20 | +36.223 | 14 | 9 |
| 8 | 2 | (Spain) Dani Pedrosa | Repsol Honda Team | Honda | 20 | +37.258 | 8 | 8 |
| 9 | 7 | (Australia) Chris Vermeulen | Rizla Suzuki MotoGP | Suzuki | 20 | +38.442 | 15 | 7 |
| 10 | 15 | (San Marino) Alex de Angelis | San Carlo Honda Gresini | Honda | 20 | +42.437 | 12 | 6 |
| 11 | 13 | (Australia) Anthony West | Kawasaki Racing Team | Kawasaki | 20 | +47.179 | 19 | 5 |
| 12 | 24 | (Spain) Toni Elías | Alice Team | Ducati | 20 | +55.962 | 9 | 4 |
| 13 | 14 | (France) Randy de Puniet | LCR Honda MotoGP | Honda | 20 | +57.366 | 6 | 3 |
| 14 | 21 | (United States) John Hopkins | Kawasaki Racing Team | Kawasaki | 20 | +58.353 | 16 | 2 |
| 15 | 5 | (United States) Colin Edwards | Tech 3 Yamaha | Yamaha | 20 | +1:00.613 | 11 | 1 |
| 16 | 65 | (Italy) Loris Capirossi | Rizla Suzuki MotoGP | Suzuki | 20 | +1:05.620 | 13 | |
| 17 | 56 | (Japan) Shinya Nakano | San Carlo Honda Gresini | Honda | 20 | +1:05.854 | 17 | |
| 18 | 52 | (United Kingdom) James Toseland | Tech 3 Yamaha | Yamaha | 20 | +1:07.968 | 10 | |
| 19 | 33 | (Italy) Marco Melandri | Ducati Team | Ducati | 20 | +1:21.023 | 18 | |

== 125cc classification ==
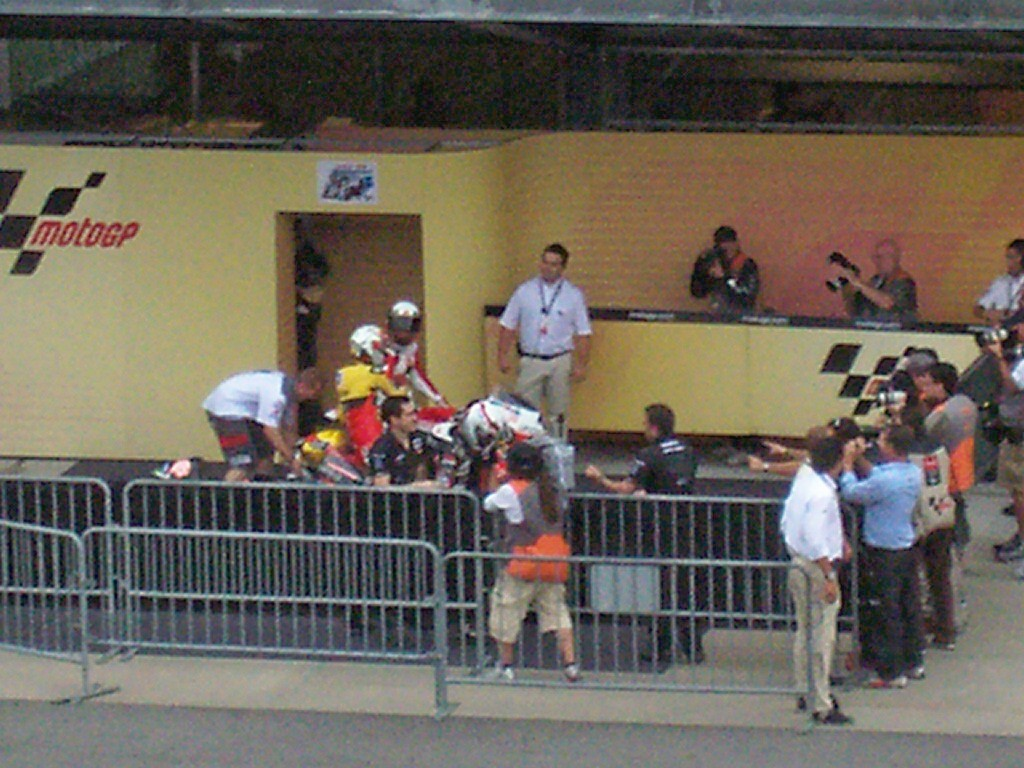
Terol celebrates with members of his crew, as Espargaró and Bradl shake hands.

| Pos. | No. | Rider | Manufacturer | Laps | Time/Retired | Grid | Points |
|---|---|---|---|---|---|---|---|
| 1 | 18 | (Spain) Nicolás Terol | Aprilia | 16 | 29:51.350 | 6 | 25 |
| 2 | 44 | (Spain) Pol Espargaró | Derbi | 16 | +1.708 | 1 | 20 |
| 3 | 17 | (Germany) Stefan Bradl | Aprilia | 16 | +3.984 | 3 | 16 |
| 4 | 45 | (United Kingdom) Scott Redding | Aprilia | 16 | +4.277 | 9 | 13 |
| 5 | 11 | (Germany) Sandro Cortese | Aprilia | 16 | +4.413 | 10 | 11 |
| 6 | 93 | (Spain) Marc Márquez | KTM | 16 | +4.454 | 13 | 10 |
| 7 | 24 | (Italy) Simone Corsi | Aprilia | 16 | +6.261 | 7 | 9 |
| 8 | 38 | (United Kingdom) Bradley Smith | Aprilia | 16 | +7.782 | 11 | 8 |
| 9 | 51 | (United States) Stevie Bonsey | Aprilia | 16 | +12.035 | 15 | 7 |
| 10 | 63 | (France) Mike Di Meglio | Derbi | 16 | +12.251 | 2 | 6 |
| 11 | 77 | (Switzerland) Dominique Aegerter | Derbi | 16 | +15.465 | 8 | 5 |
| 12 | 6 | (Spain) Joan Olivé | Derbi | 16 | +18.312 | 12 | 4 |
| 13 | 35 | (Italy) Raffaele De Rosa | KTM | 16 | +20.137 | 17 | 3 |
| 14 | 1 | (Hungary) Gábor Talmácsi | Aprilia | 16 | +24.651 | 16 | 2 |
| 15 | 99 | (United Kingdom) Danny Webb | Aprilia | 16 | +27.592 | 4 | 1 |
| 16 | 16 | (France) Jules Cluzel | Loncin | 16 | +35.432 | 31 | |
| 17 | 21 | (Germany) Robin Lässer | Aprilia | 16 | +37.082 | 22 | |
| 18 | 33 | (Spain) Sergio Gadea | Aprilia | 16 | +38.549 | 23 | |
| 19 | 71 | (Japan) Tomoyoshi Koyama | KTM | 16 | +38.571 | 18 | |
| 20 | 7 | (Spain) Efrén Vázquez | Aprilia | 16 | +40.991 | 24 | |
| 21 | 56 | (Netherlands) Hugo van den Berg | Aprilia | 16 | +1:06.197 | 30 | |
| 22 | 54 | (United States) PJ Jacobsen | Aprilia | 16 | +1:06.327 | 25 | |
| 23 | 48 | (Switzerland) Bastien Chesaux | Aprilia | 16 | +1:07.067 | 34 | |
| 24 | 94 | (Germany) Jonas Folger | KTM | 16 | +1:14.709 | 29 | |
| 25 | 95 | (Romania) Robert Mureșan | Aprilia | 16 | +1:20.413 | 32 | |
| 26 | 5 | (France) Alexis Masbou | Loncin | 16 | +1:21.880 | 27 | |
| 27 | 74 | (Italy) Davide Stirpe | KTM | 16 | +1:22.026 | 33 | |
| 28 | 36 | (France) Cyril Carrillo | Honda | 16 | +1:22.159 | 35 | |
| 29 | 90 | (United States) Kristian Lee Turner | Aprilia | 16 | +2:11.524 | 36 | |
| Ret | 8 | (Italy) Lorenzo Zanetti | KTM | 12 | Retirement | 28 | |
| Ret | 72 | (Italy) Marco Ravaioli | Aprilia | 9 | Accident | 26 | |
| Ret | 22 | (Spain) Pablo Nieto | KTM | 8 | Retirement | 20 | |
| Ret | 60 | (Austria) Michael Ranseder | Aprilia | 6 | Accident | 19 | |
| Ret | 73 | (Japan) Takaaki Nakagami | Aprilia | 5 | Accident | 14 | |
| Ret | 29 | (Italy) Andrea Iannone | Aprilia | 4 | Retirement | 5 | |
| Ret | 12 | (Spain) Esteve Rabat | KTM | 1 | Accident | 21 | |
OFFICIAL 125cc REPORT

== Championship standings after the race (MotoGP) ==
Below are the standings for the top five riders and constructors after round fourteen has concluded.

Riders' Championship standings

| Pos. | Rider | Points |
|---|---|---|
| 1 | (Italy) Valentino Rossi | 287 |
| 2 | (Australia) Casey Stoner | 200 |
| 3 | (Spain) Dani Pedrosa | 193 |
| 4 | (Spain) Jorge Lorenzo | 156 |
| 5 | (Italy) Andrea Dovizioso | 129 |

Constructors' Championship standings

| Pos. | Constructor | Points |
|---|---|---|
| 1 | (Japan) Yamaha | 316 |
| 2 | (Japan) Honda | 243 |
| 3 | (Italy) Ducati | 241 |
| 4 | (Japan) Suzuki | 149 |
| 5 | (Japan) Kawasaki | 71 |

- Note: Only the top five positions are included for both sets of standings.

| Previous race: 2008 San Marino Grand Prix | FIM Grand Prix World Championship; 2008 season | Next race: 2008 Japanese Grand Prix |
| Previous race: None | Indianapolis motorcycle Grand Prix | Next race: 2009 Indianapolis Grand Prix |
