= 2011 Malaysian motorcycle Grand Prix =

(Malaysia) 2011 Malaysian Grand Prix
Race details
- Race 17 of 18 races in the 2011 Grand Prix motorcycle racing season
- Date: 23 October 2011
- Official name: Shell Advance Malaysian Motorcycle Grand Prix
- Location: Sepang International Circuit
- Course: Permanent racing facility; 5.543 km (3.444 mi)

MotoGP
Pole position
Rider	(Spain) Dani Pedrosa	Honda
Time	2:01.462	

Moto2
Pole position
Rider	(Switzerland) Thomas Lüthi	Suter
Time	2:07.512	
Fastest lap
Rider	(Germany) Stefan Bradl	Kalex
Time	2:08.220	
Podium
First	(Switzerland) Thomas Lüthi	Suter
Second	(Germany) Stefan Bradl	Kalex
Third	(Spain) Pol Espargaró	FTR

125cc
Pole position
Rider	(Spain) Nicolás Terol	Aprilia
Time	2:13.579	
Fastest lap
Rider	(Spain) Nicolás Terol	Aprilia
Time	2:14.229	
Podium
First	(Spain) Maverick Viñales	Aprilia
Second	(Germany) Sandro Cortese	Aprilia
Third	(France) Johann Zarco	Derbi

The 2011 Malaysian motorcycle Grand Prix was the seventeenth round of the 2011 Grand Prix motorcycle racing season. It took place on the weekend of 21–23 October 2011 at the Sepang International Circuit, but the MotoGP race was red-flagged and subsequently cancelled after two laps due to a serious accident involving Marco Simoncelli. Simoncelli fell while running fourth, his bike and body veering across the path of Colin Edwards and Valentino Rossi. Simoncelli was fatally struck in the head and chest by the two bikes. He was taken straight to the circuit's medical centre, but died of his injuries shortly thereafter.

== MotoGP classification ==
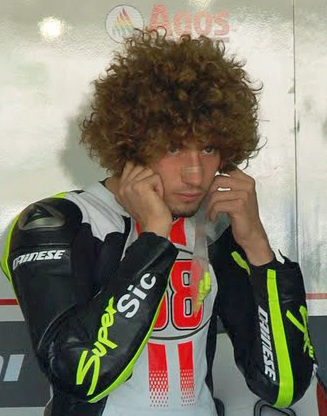
Marco Simoncelli, riding for Honda Gresini, died during the event.

After qualifying, the Repsol Honda team locked out the front row of the grid. At the start of the twenty lap race, Casey Stoner took the led from Dani Pedrosa and Andrea Dovizioso. Marco Simoncelli, in a Gresini Racing Honda, was fourth.

=== Lap 2 incident ===
Exiting the right-handed wide Turn 11 on the second lap, Simoncelli lost traction in the front wheels into a "low-side" and veered into the path of Colin Edwards and Valentino Rossi, both of whom made contact with the fallen rider on their motorcycles. His helmet was separated from the rider as part of the impact from the incident. The race was immediately stopped. Edwards suffered a separated shoulder. Officials planned a 16.30 restart, with rules calling for a completely new twenty lap race scheduled with the remaining riders as three full laps had not been completed, which is required for an official race.

Because of the seriousness of Simoncelli's situation, the 20-minute restart procedure was indefinitely delayed. MotoGP medical director Michele Macchiagodena stated to the media Simoncelli suffered cardiac arrest whilst in the ambulance. He noted, "Immediately in the Medical Centre, with the help also of the Doctor of our staff at the Clinica Mobile and local Doctors, he was intubated and it was possible to take off some blood from the thorax. The CPR was continued for 45 minutes because we tried to help him for as long as we thought it was possible. Unfortunately, it was not possible to help him, and at 16.56, we had to declare he was dead."

The race was completely abandoned as a non-event because only one lap was completed. No race winner was declared nor were points offered. The announcement of cancellation was made on timing monitors and the broadcast by Dorna and the Sepang International Circuit. Video evidence showed spectators trashed the circuit after the cancellation was announced, not understanding the fatal crash.

== Moto2 classification ==
The race was stopped after 17 laps due to an accident involving Axel Pons.

Pos.	No.	Rider	Manufacturer	Laps	Time/Retired	Grid	Points
1	12	(Switzerland) Thomas Lüthi	Suter	17	36:35.114	1	25
2	65	(Germany) Stefan Bradl	Kalex	17	+0.187	2	20
3	44	(Spain) Pol Espargaró	FTR	17	+7.465	5	16
4	15	(San Marino) Alex de Angelis	Motobi	17	+9.127	11	13
5	77	(Switzerland) Dominique Aegerter	Suter	17	+11.494	20	11
6	36	(Finland) Mika Kallio	Suter	17	+11.903	7	10
7	51	(Italy) Michele Pirro	Moriwaki	17	+12.568	3	9
8	40	(Spain) Aleix Espargaró	Pons Kalex	17	+12.963	6	8
9	29	(Italy) Andrea Iannone	Suter	17	+14.098	13	7
10	45	(United Kingdom) Scott Redding	Suter	17	+16.697	9	6
11	34	(Spain) Esteve Rabat	FTR	17	+19.568	12	5
12	54	(Turkey) Kenan Sofuoğlu	Suter	17	+24.885	19	4
13	16	(France) Jules Cluzel	Suter	17	+25.345	18	3
14	63	(France) Mike Di Meglio	Tech 3	17	+26.696	17	2
15	19	(Belgium) Xavier Siméon	Tech 3	17	+32.806	23	1
16	6	(Spain) Joan Olivé	FTR	17	+36.497	21	
17	18	(Spain) Jordi Torres	Suter	17	+40.569	27	
18	87	(Malaysia) Mohamad Zamri Baba	Moriwaki	17	+56.756	28	
19	20	(Spain) Iván Moreno	Suter	17	+1:05.966	32	
20	86	(Malaysia) Hafizh Syahrin	Moriwaki	17	+1:06.110	34	
21	4	(Switzerland) Randy Krummenacher	Kalex	17	+1:17.083	29	
22	39	(Venezuela) Robertino Pietri	Suter	17	+1:19.415	31	
23	95	(Qatar) Mashel Al Naimi	Moriwaki	16	+1 lap	35	
NC	80	(Spain) Axel Pons	Pons Kalex	17	+32.979 (Note: According to Art. 1.25.1 of the regulations, Pons and Noyes, who had not entered the pitlane within 5 minutes after the red flag, were not classified.)	25	
NC	9	(United States) Kenny Noyes	FTR	17	+33.179	30	
Ret	35	(Italy) Raffaele De Rosa	Suter	12	Retirement	22	
Ret	75	(Italy) Mattia Pasini	FTR	8	Accident	10	
Ret	64	(Colombia) Santiago Hernández	FTR	7	Accident	26	
Ret	23	(Thailand) Apiwat Wongthananon	FTR	7	Retirement	36	
Ret	53	(France) Valentin Debise	FTR	6	Retirement	24	
Ret	72	(Japan) Yuki Takahashi	Moriwaki	5	Retirement	4	
Ret	71	(Italy) Claudio Corti	Suter	3	Collision	8	
Ret	3	(Italy) Simone Corsi	FTR	3	Collision	14	
Ret	13	(Australia) Anthony West	MZ-RE Honda	1	Collision	16	
Ret	76	(Germany) Max Neukirchner	MZ-RE Honda	1	Collision	15	
DSQ	68	(Colombia) Yonny Hernández	FTR	8	Black flag	33	
DNS	88	(Spain) Ricard Cardús	Moriwaki		Injury		
WD	93	(Spain) Marc Márquez	Suter		Injury		
WD	38	(United Kingdom) Bradley Smith	Tech 3		Injury		
OFFICIAL MOTO2 REPORT

== 125 cc classification ==
Pos.	No.	Rider	Manufacturer	Laps	Time/Retired	Grid	Points
1	25	(Spain) Maverick Viñales	Aprilia	18	40:34.280	7	25
2	11	(Germany) Sandro Cortese	Aprilia	18	+0.354	3	20
3	5	(France) Johann Zarco	Derbi	18	+2.455	15	16
4	55	(Spain) Héctor Faubel	Aprilia	18	+2.921	2	13
5	18	(Spain) Nicolás Terol	Aprilia	18	+10.049	1	11
6	94	(Germany) Jonas Folger	Aprilia	18	+17.964	6	10
7	63	(Malaysia) Zulfahmi Khairuddin	Derbi	18	+38.706	13	9
8	84	(Czech Republic) Jakub Kornfeil	Aprilia	18	+39.099	11	8
9	23	(Spain) Alberto Moncayo	Aprilia	18	+39.223	8	7
10	52	(United Kingdom) Danny Kent	Aprilia	18	+40.237	10	6
11	7	(Spain) Efrén Vázquez	Derbi	18	+54.806	4	5
12	10	(France) Alexis Masbou	KTM	18	+1:07.891	14	4
13	99	(United Kingdom) Danny Webb	Mahindra	18	+1:07.907	12	3
14	28	(Spain) Josep Rodríguez	Aprilia	18	+1:08.099	24	2
15	19	(Italy) Alessandro Tonucci	Aprilia	18	+1:08.156	21	1
16	8	(Australia) Jack Miller	KTM	18	+1:15.230	26	
17	30	(Switzerland) Giulian Pedone	Aprilia	18	+1:18.703	18	
18	96	(France) Louis Rossi	Aprilia	18	+1:18.913	17	
19	50	(Norway) Sturla Fagerhaug	Aprilia	18	+1:30.270	28	
20	32	(Australia) Arthur Sissis	Aprilia	18	+1:31.810	30	
21	17	(United Kingdom) Taylor Mackenzie	Aprilia	18	+1:33.250	22	
22	60	(Italy) Manuel Tatasciore	Aprilia	18	+1:50.690	29	
23	40	(Switzerland) Marco Colandrea	Aprilia	18	+2:02.252	32	
24	64	(Malaysia) Farid Badrul	Derbi	18	+2:16.968	31	
Ret	14	(South Africa) Brad Binder	Aprilia	16	Retirement	27	
Ret	26	(Spain) Adrián Martín	Aprilia	10	Retirement	9	
Ret	3	(Italy) Luigi Morciano	Aprilia	8	Collision	25	
Ret	21	(United Kingdom) Harry Stafford	Aprilia	8	Collision	19	
Ret	77	(Germany) Marcel Schrötter	Mahindra	5	Accident	16	
Ret	39	(Spain) Luis Salom	Aprilia	0	Collision	5	
Ret	53	(Netherlands) Jasper Iwema	Aprilia	0	Collision	20	
Ret	36	(Spain) Joan Perelló	Aprilia	0	Collision	23	
OFFICIAL 125cc REPORT

== Notes ==
Previous race: 2011 Australian Grand Prix	FIM Grand Prix World Championship; 2011 season	Next race: 2011 Valencian Grand Prix
Previous race: 2010 Malaysian Grand Prix	Malaysian motorcycle Grand Prix	Next race: 2012 Malaysian Grand Prix
