= Arthur Sissis =

Australian motorcycle racer

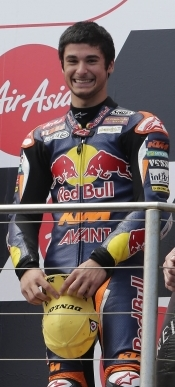
- Sissis at the 2012 Australian Grand Prix
- Nationality: Australian
- Born: 15 June 1995 (age 31); Adelaide, South Australia
- Current team: Unitech Racing Team
- Bike number: 61
- Website: www.instagram.com/arthursissis61
Motorcycle racing career statistics
Moto3 World Championship
Active years	2012–2014
Manufacturers	KTM, Mahindra
Championships	0
2014 championship position	29th (3 pts)
Starts / Wins / Podiums / Poles / F. laps / Points; 44 / 0 / 1 / 0 / 0 / 146
125cc World Championship
Active years	2011
Manufacturers	Aprilia
Championships	0
2011 championship position	NC (0 pts)
Starts / Wins / Podiums / Poles / F. laps / Points; 1 / 0 / 0 / 0 / 0 / 0

Arthur Sissis (born 15 June 1995) is an Australian motorcycle and speedway rider and former Grand Prix motorcycle racer who last rode for Mahindra Racing in the Moto3 World Championship before being replaced by Andrea Migno mid season due to racing positions. He currently competes in the Australian Superbike Championship, aboard a Yamaha YZF-R1 2021.

== Career ==
=== Junior speedway ===
Sissis was born in Adelaide, South Australia, but grew up in the small town of Virginia, some 40 kilometres (25 miles) north of Adelaide. Sissis started racing junior motocross before joining the Sidewinders Under 16 Speedway Club in the northern suburbs of Adelaide at just nine years of age. He went on to win the 2008 and 2009, 2011 Australian Under-16 Individual Speedway Championships, and finished second to Brady Kurtz from New South Wales, in the final of the 2010 championship.

=== Red Bull MotoGP Rookie Cup ===
Sissis then chased his Grand Prix dream and went on to ride in the 2010 Red Bull MotoGP Rookie Cup. A best placing of sixth in the first race of Round 3 at Assen saw him finish 13th in the championship. He again rode in the championship in 2011, scoring three wins (Jerez race 2, Assen race 2 and Mugello race 1) and finished second in the championship, only nine points behind Italian Lorenzo Baldassarri.

It was during 2011 that Sissis got his first Grand Prix start when he rode an Aprilia 125cc at the Malaysian Grand Prix. After qualifying 30th, he had a steady race and finished in 20th.

=== Moto3 World Championship ===
In 2012, Sissis has joined the Red Bull KTM Ajo team for the Moto3 World Championship, replacing the 125cc World Championship. After qualifying ninth for the first race at the Losail International Circuit in Qatar, Sissis got a good start and was second on the first lap before slowly dropping back and eventually finishing seventh.

The high point in Sissis' racing career to date was his third-place finish at his home Grand Prix at Phillip Island on 28 October 2012. Sissis led home a competitive pack behind the two leaders, his position only secured in the final seconds of the race, by only 0.054 seconds from fourth placed Alex Rins. This result was his only Grand Prix podium.

=== Return to speedway ===
In December 2014, Sissis decided on a return to speedway, signing to ride in 2015 for Sheffield Tigers in the British Premier League.

In his return to speedway, Sissis finished tenth in the 2014/15 South Australian Solo Championship held at the Gillman Speedway in Adelaide on 28 December 2014.

In May 2016, Sissis rejoined the Sheffield Tigers team.

== Career statistics ==
=== Red Bull MotoGP Rookies Cup ===
==== Races by year ====
(key) (Races in bold indicate pole position, races in italics indicate fastest lap)

Year	1	2	3	4	5	6	7	8	9	10	11	12	13	14	Pos	Pts
2009	SPA1; Ret	SPA2; 18	ITA; 6	NED; 8	GER; Ret	GBR; 12	CZE1; 15	CZE2; 11							13th	28
2010	SPA1; 12	SPA2; 12	ITA; 15	NED1; 6	NED2; 11	GER1; 11	GER2; 9	CZE1; Ret	CZE2; 11	RSM; 14					13th	43
2011	SPA1; 6	SPA2; 1	POR1; 2	POR2; 1	GBR1; 9	GBR2; 7	NED1; 2	NED2; 1	ITA; 1	GER1; 18	GER2; Ret	CZE1; 2	CZE2; Ret	RSM; 4	2nd	199

=== Grand Prix motorcycle racing ===
==== By season ====
Season	Class	Motorcycle	Team	Number	Race	Win	Podium	Pole	FLap	Pts	Plcd
2011	125cc	Aprilia	TT Motion Events Racing	32	1	0	0	0	0	0	NC
2012	Moto3	KTM	Red Bull KTM Ajo	61	17	0	1	0	0	84	12th
2013	Moto3	KTM	Red Bull KTM Ajo	61	17	0	0	0	0	59	15th
2014	Moto3	Mahindra	Mahindra Racing	61	10	0	0	0	0	3	29th
Total					**45**	**0**	**1**	**0**	**0**	**146**	

==== Races by year ====
(key) (Races in bold indicate pole position; races in italics indicate fastest lap)

Year	Class	Bike	1	2	3	4	5	6	7	8	9	10	11	12	13	14	15	16	17	18	Pos	Pts
2011	125cc	Aprilia	QAT	SPA	POR	FRA	CAT	GBR	NED	ITA	GER	CZE	INP	RSM	ARA	JPN	AUS	MAL; 20	VAL		NC	0
2012	Moto3	KTM	QAT; 7	SPA; Ret	POR; 13	FRA; 5	CAT; 22	GBR; 8	NED; 16	GER; 9	ITA; Ret	INP; 11	CZE; 14	RSM; 10	ARA; 9	JPN; 11	MAL; 11	AUS; 3	VAL; 19		12th	84
2013	Moto3	KTM	QAT; 8	AME; 12	SPA; 12	FRA; 13	ITA; 18	CAT; 10	NED; 8	GER; 10	INP; 6	CZE; 14	GBR; 24	RSM; 15	ARA; 9	MAL; 19	AUS; 16	JPN; 16	VAL; 18		15th	59
2014	Moto3	Mahindra	QAT; DNS	AME; Ret	ARG; 22	SPA; Ret	FRA; 17	ITA; 17	CAT; 18	NED; 21	GER; 13	INP; 21	CZE; 26	GBR	RSM	ARA	JPN	AUS	MAL	VAL	29th	3

=== Australian Superbike Championship ===
==== Races by year ====
(key) (Races in bold indicate pole position; races in italics indicate fastest lap)

Year	Bike	1		2		3		4			5		6			7		Pos	Pts
Year	Bike	R1	R2	R1	R2	R1	R2	R1	R2	R3	R1	R2	R1	R2	R3	R1	R2	Pos	Pts
2022	Yamaha	PHI; 8	PHI; 8	QUE; 7	QUE; 4	WAK; 6	WAK; 6	HID; 7	HID; 7	HID; 5	MOR; 8	MOR; 9	PHI; 4	PHI; 9	PHI; 7	BEN; 5	BEN; 5	6th	231
