= Daniel Ruiz (motorcyclist) =

Spanish motorcycle racer

- Nationality: Spanish
- Born: 15 April 1992 (age 34); Pamplona, Spain

Daniel Ruiz Vives (born 1992), is a Grand Prix motorcycle racer from Spain.

== Career statistics ==
=== Red Bull MotoGP Rookies Cup ===
==== Races by year ====
(key) (Races in bold indicate pole position, races in italics indicate fastest lap)

Year	1	2	3	4	5	6	7	8	9	10	Pos	Pts
2008	SPA1; 6	SPA2; 7	POR; 10	FRA; 7	ITA; 4	GBR; 13	NED; 6	GER; Ret	CZE1; 21	CZE2; 13	8th	63
2009	SPA1; 9	SPA2; 17	ITA; 5	NED; 7	GER; 14	GBR; 2	CZE1; 23	CZE2; 9			5th	94
2010	SPA1; 3	SPA2; 1	**ITA**; 6	NED1; 8	NED2; 1	GER1; 7	GER2; Ret	CZE1; 5	CZE2; Ret	RSM; 5	4th	115

=== Grand Prix motorcycle racing ===
==== By season ====
Season	Class	Motorcycle	Team	Number	Race	Win	Podium	Pole	FLap	Pts	Plcd
2011	125cc	Honda	Larresport	34	2	0	0	0	0	0	NC
Total					**2**	**0**	**0**	**0**	**0**	**0**	

==== Races by year ====
(key)

Yr	Class	Bike	1	2	3	4	5	6	7	8	9	10	11	12	13	14	15	16	17	Pos	Pts
2011	125cc	Honda	QAT	SPA; 21	POR	FRA	CAT	GBR	NED	ITA	GER	CZE	INP	RSM	ARA	JPN	AUS	MAL	VAL; 19	NC	0
