= Kevin Calia =

Italian motorcycle racer (born 1994)

- Nationality: Italian
- Born: 9 September 1994 (age 32); Castel San Pietro Terme, Italy
- Current team: Team Penta
- Bike number: 74
Motorcycle racing career statistics
Moto3 World Championship
Active years	2012
Manufacturers	Honda
2012 championship position	35th (2 pts)
Starts / Wins / Podiums / Poles / F. laps / Points; 2 / 0 / 0 / 0 / 0 / 2
125cc World Championship
Active years	2011
Manufacturers	Aprilia
2011 championship position	NC (0 pts)
Starts / Wins / Podiums / Poles / F. laps / Points; 2 / 0 / 0 / 0 / 0 / 0

Kevin Calia (born 9 September 1994) is an Italian motorcycle racer. He currently competes the CIV Superbike Championship, aboard a Suzuki GSX-R1000. He competed in the Red Bull MotoGP Rookies Cup, the Italian 125GP championship and the Italian Moto3 championship, where he was champion in 2012.

== Career statistics ==
=== Career highlights ===
- 2013 - 19th, FIM Superstock 1000 Cup, Ducati 1098
- 2014 - 27th, FIM Superstock 1000 Cup, Aprilia RSV4
- 2015 - 7th, FIM Superstock 1000 Cup, Aprilia RSV4
- 2016 - 3rd, FIM Superstock 1000 Cup, Aprilia RSV4
- 2017 - 25th, European Superstock 1000 Championship, Suzuki GSX-R1000

=== Red Bull MotoGP Rookies Cup ===
==== Races by year ====
(key) (Races in bold indicate pole position, races in italics indicate fastest lap)

Year	1	2	3	4	5	6	7	8	9	10	Pos	Pts
2008	SPA1; 13	SPA2; 19	POR; 12	FRA	ITA; Ret	GBR; 10	NED; 17	GER; 11	CZE1; Ret	CZE2; 19	18th	24
2009	SPA1; 12	SPA2; 8	ITA; Ret	NED; 9	GER; 11	GBR; 10	CZE1; 13	CZE2; 12			12th	37
2010	SPA1; 10	SPA2; Ret	ITA; 5	NED1; 2	NED2; 5	GER1; 5	GER2; Ret	CZE1; 1	CZE2; Ret	RSM; 4	6th	97

=== CEV Moto3 Championship ===
==== Races by year ====
(key) (Races in bold indicate pole position, races in italics indicate fastest lap)

Year	Bike	1	2	3	4	5	6	7	Pos	Pts
2012	Kalex KTM	JER	NAV	ARA	CAT	ALB1	ALB2	VAL; 3	20th	16

=== Grand Prix motorcycle racing ===
==== By season ====
Season	Class	Motorcycle	Team	Race	Win	Podium	Pole	FLap	Pts	Plcd
2011	125cc	Aprilia	MGP Racing	2	0	0	0	0	0	NC
2012	Moto3	Honda	Elle 2 Ciatti	2	0	0	0	0	2	35th
Total				**4**	**0**	**0**	**0**	**0**	**2**	

==== Races by year ====
(key)

Year	Class	Bike	1	2	3	4	5	6	7	8	9	10	11	12	13	14	15	16	17	Pos.	Pts
2011	125cc	Aprilia	QAT	SPA	POR	FRA	CAT	GBR	NED	ITA; Ret	GER	CZE	INP	RSM; 16	ARA	JPN	AUS	MAL	VAL	NC	0
2012	Moto3	Honda	QAT	SPA	POR	FRA	CAT	GBR	NED	GER	ITA; 14	INP	CZE	RSM; Ret	ARA	JPN	MAL	AUS	VAL	35th	2

=== Superstock 1000 Cup ===
==== Races by year ====
(key) (Races in bold indicate pole position) (Races in italics indicate fastest lap)

Year	Bike	1	2	3	4	5	6	7	8	9	10	Pos	Pts
2013	Ducati	ARA	NED	MNZ	ALG	IMO	SIL	SIL	NŰR	MAG; 16	JER; 6	19th	10
2014	Aprilia	ARA	NED	IMO; Ret	MIS; 12	ALG	JER	MAG				27th	4
2015	Aprilia	ARA; Ret	NED; 5	IMO; 15	DON; 7	ALG; 7	MIS; 4	JER; Ret	MAG; 2			7th	63
2016	Aprilia	ARA; 6	NED; 13	IMO; 2	DON; 4	MIS; 2	LAU; 5	MAG; Ret	JER; 9			3rd	84

=== European Superstock 1000 Championship ===
==== Races by year ====
(key) (Races in bold indicate pole position) (Races in italics indicate fastest lap)

Year	Bike	1	2	3	4	5	6	7	8	9	Pos	Pts
2017	Suzuki	ARA; 16	NED; 13	IMO; 18	DON; 12	MIS; DNS	LAU	ALG	MAG	JER	25th	7

=== FIM Endurance World Cup ===
Year	Team	Bike	Tyre	Rider	Pts	TC
2025	(Italy) Revo-M2	Aprilia RSV4	**D**	(Italy) Simone Saltarelli (Italy) Flavio Ferroni (Italy) Kevin Calia (Italy) Luca Vitali	37*	8th*

=== Suzuka 8 Hours results ===
Year	Team	Riders	Bike	Pos
2025	(Italy) Revo M-2	(Italy) Simone Saltarelli (Italy) Flavio Ferroni (Italy) Kevin Calia	Aprilia RSV4	18th
