= Sturla Fagerhaug =

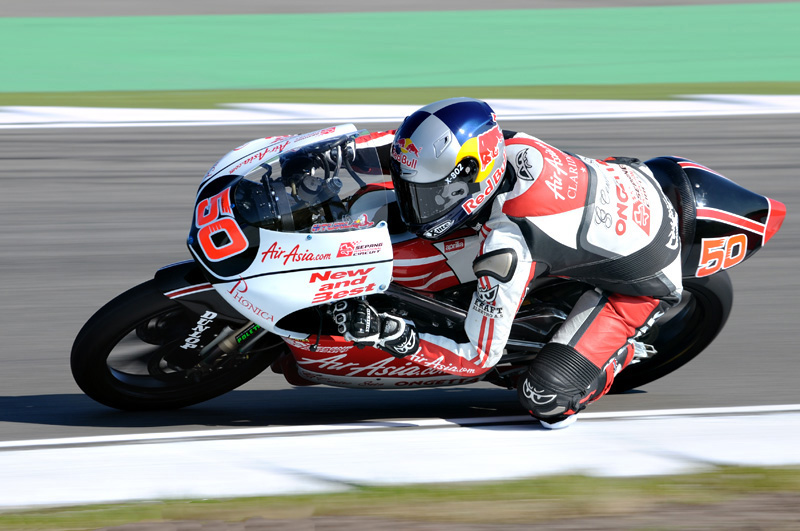
- Fagerhaug at the 2010 Dutch TT
- Born: 6 November 1991 (age 34); Heggedal, Norway
- Occupations: Motorcycle racer, surfer

Sturla Borch Fagerhaug (born 6 November 1991) is a Norwegian former Grand Prix motorcycle racer. He retired from racing after 2011 when he was 20. Fagerhaug is now a surfer, competing in the Lofoten Masters and the European Championship in 2017.

== Career statistics ==
=== Red Bull MotoGP Rookies Cup ===
==== Races by year ====
(key) (Races in bold indicate pole position, races in italics indicate fastest lap)

| Year | 1 | 2 | 3 | 4 | 5 | 6 | 7 | 8 | 9 | 10 | Pos | Pts |
|---|---|---|---|---|---|---|---|---|---|---|---|---|
| 2007 | ESP; 9 | ITA; 6 | GBR; 12 | NED; 17 | GER; Ret | CZE; 6 | POR; 13 | VAL; 7 | | | 11th | 43 |
| 2008 | ESP1; 7 | ESP2; 4 | POR; 3 | FRA; 6 | ITA; 7 | GBR; 2 | **NED**; 2 | GER; Ret | CZE1; 2 | CZE2; 1 | 3rd | 142 |
| 2009 | ESP1; 1 | ESP2; 2 | **ITA**; 1 | **NED**; 1 | GER; 12 | GBR; Ret | CZE1; 5 | CZE2; 2 | | | 2nd | 130 |

=== Grand Prix motorcycle racing ===
==== By season ====
| Season | Class | Motorcycle | Team | Number | Race | Win | Podium | Pole | FLap | Pts | Plcd |
|---|---|---|---|---|---|---|---|---|---|---|---|
| 2009 | 125cc | KTM | Red Bull KTM Moto Sport | 50 | 4 | 0 | 0 | 0 | 0 | 0 | NC |
| 2010 | 125cc | Aprilia | AirAsia-Sepang Int. Circuit | 50 | 16 | 0 | 0 | 0 | 0 | 12 | 21st |
| 2011 | 125cc | Aprilia | WTR-Ten10 Racing | 50 | 13 | 0 | 0 | 0 | 0 | 1 | 34th |
| Total | | | | | **33** | **0** | **0** | **0** | **0** | **13** | |

==== Races by year ====
| Year | Class | Bike | 1 | 2 | 3 | 4 | 5 | 6 | 7 | 8 | 9 | 10 | 11 | 12 | 13 | 14 | 15 | 16 | 17 | Pos | Points |
|---|---|---|---|---|---|---|---|---|---|---|---|---|---|---|---|---|---|---|---|---|---|
| 2009 | 125cc | KTM | QAT | JPN | SPA | FRA; Ret | ITA | CAT; 22 | NED | GER | GBR | CZE | INP | RSM | POR; 19 | AUS | MAL | VAL; Ret | | NC | 0 |
| 2010 | 125cc | Aprilia | QAT; 18 | SPA; Ret | FRA; 20 | ITA; Ret | GBR; 18 | NED; 17 | CAT; Ret | GER; 9 | CZE; 20 | INP | RSM; Ret | ARA; 15 | JPN; Ret | MAL; Ret | AUS; 12 | POR; Ret | VAL; Ret | 21st | 12 |
| 2011 | 125cc | Aprilia | QAT | SPA | POR | FRA | CAT; 19 | GBR; Ret | NED; 31 | ITA; Ret | GER; 21 | CZE; 16 | INP; Ret | RSM; Ret | ARA; 16 | JPN; 18 | AUS; 15 | MAL; 19 | VAL; 16 | 34th | 1 |
