= 2009 Red Bull MotoGP Rookies Cup =

Motorcycle racing competition

2009 Red Bull MotoGP Rookies Cup season

Seasons
- ← 2008 2010 →

Starting its third season, the 2009 Red Bull MotoGP Rookies Cup season continued the search for future World Champions. The 2009 season begins with two races during the Spanish Grand Prix weekend at Jerez on May 2 and May 3 and ends with another double header at the Czech Republic Grand Prix in Brno on August 15 and August 16. Another six European GPs see single Rookies races on each Saturday, making it an eight-race championship, which is two more races than the last season.

The commercial rights of the championship are held by the rights-holders for the MotoGP World Championships, Dorna Sports.

The Czech Jakub Kornfeil was proclaimed champion in the last race, in only his second season of road racing.

== Calendar ==
Round	Date	Grand Prix	Circuit	Pole position	Fastest lap	Race winner	Sources
1	May 2	(Spain) Spanish Grand Prix	Jerez	(Japan) Daijiro Hiura	(Spain) Daniel Ruiz	(Norway) Sturla Fagerhaug	
1	May 3	(Spain) Spanish Grand Prix	Jerez	(Japan) Daijiro Hiura	(Japan) Daijiro Hiura	(United Kingdom) Danny Kent	
2	May 30	(Italy) Italian Grand Prix	Mugello Circuit	(Norway) Sturla Fagerhaug	(Norway) Sturla Fagerhaug	(Norway) Sturla Fagerhaug	
3	June 27	(Netherlands) Dutch TT	TT Circuit Assen	(Norway) Sturla Fagerhaug	(France) Florian Marino	(Norway) Sturla Fagerhaug	
4	July 18	(Germany) German Grand Prix	Sachsenring	(United Kingdom) Danny Kent	(Czech Republic) Jakub Kornfeil	(Czech Republic) Jakub Kornfeil	
5	July 25	(United Kingdom) British Grand Prix	Donington Park	(United Kingdom) Danny Kent	(Spain) Daniel Ruiz	(Czech Republic) Jakub Kornfeil	
6	August 15	Czech Republic Grand Prix	Brno	(Japan) Daijiro Hiura	(Italy) Alejandro Pardo	(France) Florian Marino	
6	August 16	Czech Republic Grand Prix	Brno	(Japan) Daijiro Hiura	(Japan) Daijiro Hiura	(Czech Republic) Jakub Kornfeil	

== Entry list ==
Notes

- All Entrants were riding a KTM
- Tyres were supplied by Dunlop

No	Rider	Rounds
4	(Spain) Xavier Figueras	All
7	(United Kingdom) Deane Brown	3–6
16	(Australia) Joshua Hook	1–3, 5–6
17	(Netherlands) Thomas van Leeuwen	2–3
20	(South Africa) Mathew Scholtz	All
21	(France) Florian Marino	All
22	(Spain) Daniel Ruiz	All
24	(United Kingdom) Harry Stafford	1, 4–6
27	(Italy) Alessio Cappella	All
30	(Australia) Dylan Mavin	All
32	(United States) Jacob Gagne	All
33	(Norway) Sturla Fagerhaug	All
35	(United States) Benny Solis	All
36	(Austria) Nico Thöni	All
41	(South Africa) Brad Binder	All
44	(France) Nelson Major	All
46	(Japan) Daijiro Hiura	All
47	(Italy) Kevin Calia	All
52	(United Kingdom) Danny Kent	All
61	(Australia) Arthur Sissis	All
63	(Spain) Joan Perelló	All
69	(United States) Hayden Gillim	All
70	(Sweden) Alexander Kristiansson	All
71	(United Kingdom) Taylor Mackenzie	All
77	(Italy) Alejandro Pardo	All
84	(Czech Republic) Jakub Kornfeil	All
89	(United Kingdom) Fraser Rogers	All
93	(France) Robin Barbosa	All

== Season standings ==
=== Scoring system ===
Points are awarded to the top fifteen finishers. Rider has to finish the race to earn points.

Position	1st	2nd	3rd	4th	5th	6th	7th	8th	9th	10th	11th	12th	13th	14th	15th
Points	25	20	16	13	11	10	9	8	7	6	5	4	3	2	1

=== Riders' standings ===
Pos	Rider	JER (Spain)		MUG (Italy)	ASS (Netherlands)	SAC (Germany)	DON (United Kingdom)	BRN (Czech Republic)		Pts
1	(Czech Republic) Jakub Kornfeil	8	6	2	5	1	1	8	1	132
2	(Norway) Sturla Fagerhaug	1	2	**1**	**1**	12	Ret	5	2	130
3	(Japan) Daijiro Hiura	**Ret**	**3**	3	2	4	3	**6**	**4**	104
4	(United Kingdom) Danny Kent	3	1	7	Ret	**6**	**8**	2	8	96
5	(France) Florian Marino	Ret	4	4	4	5	6	1	7	94
6	(United States) Jacob Gagne	11	9	Ret	3	3	5	4	3	84
7	(South Africa) Mathew Scholtz	2	7	17	10	2	7	10	5	81
8	(Spain) Daniel Ruiz	9	17	5	7	14	2	23	9	56
9	(Sweden) Alexander Kristiansson	4	Ret	9	6	8	11	9	Ret	50
10	(Italy) Alejandro Pardo	6	5	Ret	14	7	Ret	3	Ret	48
11	(France) Nelson Major	7	Ret	Ret	Ret	10	4	7	6	47
12	(Italy) Kevin Calia	12	8	Ret	9	11	10	13	12	37
13	(Australia) Arthur Sissis	Ret	18	6	8	Ret	12	15	11	28
14	(South Africa) Brad Binder	13	10	Ret	16	Ret	15	11	14	17
15	(United Kingdom) Harry Stafford	Ret	DNS			9	14	12	13	16
16	(United States) Hayden Gillim	10	DNS	13	12	Ret	18	22	Ret	13
17	(Australia) Dylan Mavin	18	12	8	23	19	20	24	21	12
18	(Spain) Xavier Figueras	14	11	14	18	13	17	21	18	12
19	(Australia) Joshua Hook	5	Ret	Ret	Ret	DNS		16	16	11
20	(United Kingdom) Taylor Mackenzie	19	14	15	21	Ret	9	Ret	Ret	10
21	(United Kingdom) Deane Brown				13	Ret	Ret	18	10	9
22	(Austria) Nico Thöni	17	16	10	Ret	DNS	19	14	Ret	8
23	(France) Robin Barbosa	Ret	13	11	19	18	Ret	Ret	22	8
24	(United States) Benny Solis	20	Ret	12	20	15	Ret	17	15	6
25	(Italy) Alessio Cappella	16	DNS	DNS	11	Ret	16	20	17	5
26	(United Kingdom) Fraser Rogers	Ret	Ret	18	22	16	13	25	20	3
27	(Spain) Joan Perelló	15	15	16	15	17	Ret	19	19	3
	(Netherlands) Thomas van Leeuwen			19	17					0
Pos	Rider	JER (Spain)		MUG (Italy)	ASS (Netherlands)	SAC (Germany)	DON (United Kingdom)	BRN (Czech Republic)		Pts

Colour	Result
Gold	Winner
Silver	Second place
Bronze	Third place
Green	Points classification
Blue	Non-points classification
Blue	Non-classified finish (NC)
Purple	Retired, not classified (Ret)
Red	Did not qualify (DNQ)
Red	Did not pre-qualify (DNPQ)
Black	Disqualified (DSQ)
White	Did not start (DNS)
White	Withdrew (WD)
White	Race cancelled (C)
Blank	Did not practice (DNP)
Blank	Did not arrive (DNA)
Blank	Excluded (EX)

**Bold** - Pole
Italics - Fastest Lap
