= Harry Stafford (motorcyclist) =

British motorcycle racer

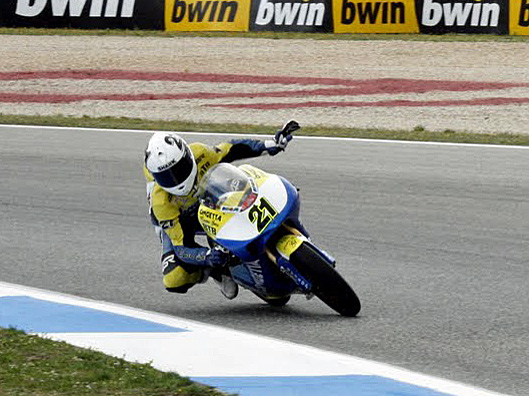
- Stafford at the 2011 Portuguese GP
- Nationality: English
- Born: 15 September 1993 (age 33); Leicester, England

Harry Stafford (born 15 September 1993 in Leicester) is a British former Grand Prix motorcycle racer. He has also competed in the Red Bull MotoGP Rookies Cup, British 125 Championship and the British National Superstock 1000 Championship, he last competed in the European Superstock 600 Championship aboard a Honda CBR600RR.

== Career statistics ==
2008 – 24th, Red Bull MotoGP Rookies Cup #24 KTM FRR 125
2009 – 15th, Red Bull MotoGP Rookies Cup #24 KTM FRR 125 / 18th, British 125 Championship #21 Honda RS125R
2010 – 7th, Red Bull MotoGP Rookies Cup #24 KTM FRR 125 / 27th, British 125 Championship #21 Honda RS125R
2011 – 28th, 125cc World Championship #21 Aprilia RS 125 R
2012 – No ride
2013 – NC, National Superstock 1000 Championship #21 MV Agusta F4
2014 – 45th, European Superstock 600 Championship #21 Honda CBR600RR

=== Red Bull MotoGP Rookies Cup ===
==== Races by year ====
(key) (Races in bold indicate pole position, races in italics indicate fastest lap)

Year	1	2	3	4	5	6	7	8	9	10	Pos	Pts
2008	SPA1; 16	SPA2; 20	POR; 18	FRA; 16	ITA; 17	GBR; Ret	NED; 20	GER; 13	CZE1; 15	CZE2; 17	24th	4
2009	SPA1; Ret	SPA2; DNS	ITA	NED	GER; 9	GBR; 14	CZE1; 12	CZE2; 13			15th	16
2010	SPA1; Ret	SPA2; 5	ITA; Ret	NED1; 4	NED2; 3	GER1; Ret	GER2; Ret	CZE1; 6	CZE2; Ret	RSM; 7	9th	79

=== British 125 Championship ===
Year	Bike	1	2	3	4	5	6	7	8	9	10	11	12	13	Pos	Pts
2009	Honda	BHI; 8	OUL	DON	THR	SNE	KNO	MAL	BHGP; 13	CAD; 21	CRO; 8	SIL; 9	OUL; Ret		**18th**	**26**
2010	Honda	BRH; Ret	THR; 18	OUL	CAD; DNS	MAL	KNO; C	SNE	BRH; DNS	CAD	CRO; 11	CRO; DNS	SIL; 8	OUL; 10	**27th**	**16.5**

=== Grand Prix motorcycle racing ===
==== By season ====
Season	Class	Motorcycle	Team	Number	Race	Win	Podium	Pole	FLap	Pts	Plcd
2011	125cc	Aprilia	Ongetta-Centro Seta	21	15	0	0	0	0	5	28th
Total					**15**	**0**	**0**	**0**	**0**	**5**	

==== Races by year ====
(key) (Races in bold indicate pole position, races in italics indicate fastest lap)

Year	Class	Bike	1	2	3	4	5	6	7	8	9	10	11	12	13	14	15	16	17	Pos	Pts
2011	125cc	Aprilia	QAT; 25	SPA; 18	POR; Ret	FRA; Ret	CAT; Ret	GBR; DNS	NED; 25	ITA; Ret	GER; Ret	CZE; 13	INP; Ret	RSM; Ret	ARA; Ret	JPN; 14	AUS	MAL; Ret	VAL; Ret	28th	5

=== European Superstock 600 ===
==== Races by year ====
(key) (Races in bold indicate pole position, races in italics indicate fastest lap)

Year	Bike	1	2	3	4	5	6	7	Pos	Pts
2014	Honda	SPA; 28	NED; Ret	IMO; DNS	ITA	POR	SPA	FRA	NC	0
