= Joan Perelló =

Spanish motorcycle racer

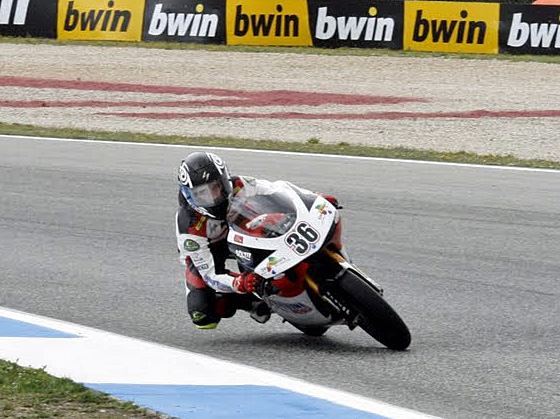
- Perelló at the 2011 Portuguese Grand Prix
- Nationality: Spanish
- Born: 6 October 1993 (age 33); Palma, Spain

Joan Perelló Alejo (born 6 October 1993, in Palma) is a Spanish Grand Prix motorcycle racer. He is the cousin of the world champion in the 2017 Moto3 World Championship & 2020 MotoGP World Championship, Joan Mir.

== Career statistics ==
=== Red Bull MotoGP Rookies Cup ===
==== Races by year ====
(key) (Races in bold indicate pole position, races in italics indicate fastest lap)

Year	1	2	3	4	5	6	7	8	Pos	Pts
2009	SPA1; 15	SPA2; 15	ITA; 16	NED; 15	GER; 17	GBR; Ret	CZE1; 19	CZE2; 19	27th	3

=== Grand Prix motorcycle racing ===
==== By season ====
Season	Class	Motorcycle	Team	Number	Race	Win	Podium	Pole	FLap	Pts	Plcd
2009	125cc	Honda	SAG Castrol	58	0	0	0	0	0	0	NC
2010	125cc	Honda	SAG Castrol	58	4	0	0	0	0	0	NC
2010	125cc	Lambretta	Lambretta Reparto Corse	36	1	0	0	0	0	0	NC
2011	125cc	Aprilia	Matteoni Racing	36	16	0	0	0	0	0	NC
Total					**21**	**0**	**0**	**0**	**0**	**0**	

==== Races by year ====
Year	Class	Bike	1	2	3	4	5	6	7	8	9	10	11	12	13	14	15	16	17	Pos	Points
2009	125cc	Honda	QAT	JPN	SPA	FRA	ITA	CAT	NED	GER	GBR	CZE	INP	RSM	POR	AUS	MAL	VAL; DNS		NC	0
2010	125cc	Lambretta	QAT	SPA; 18	FRA	ITA	GBR	NED	CAT; 19	GER	CZE	INP	RSM; 25	ARA; 19	JPN	MAL	AUS	POR	VAL; 18	NC	0
2011	125cc	Aprilia	QAT; Ret	SPA; 23	POR; 20	FRA; Ret	CAT; 27	GBR; 19	NED; 27	ITA; Ret	GER; 23	CZE; 22	INP; 20	RSM; 25	ARA; Ret	JPN; 22	AUS; Ret	MAL; Ret	VAL	NC	0
