= 2010 Red Bull MotoGP Rookies Cup =

Motorcycle racing competition

2010 Red Bull MotoGP Rookies Cup season

Seasons
- ← 2009 2011 →

The 2010 Red Bull MotoGP Rookies Cup season was the fourth season of the Red Bull MotoGP Rookies Cup. The season began on May 1 at Circuito de Jerez and ended at the Misano World Circuit on September 4, after ten races.

Jacob Gagne was champion, securing the championship with a second-place finish in the final round at Misano.

== Calendar ==
The double header at the Czech Republic Grand Prix in Brno moved to the penultimate event of the season, with six European GPs seeing races, four of which being double headers.

2010 Calendar
Round	Date	Grand Prix	Circuit	Pole position	Fastest lap	Race winner
1	May 1	(Spain) Spanish Grand Prix	Jerez	(Japan) Daijiro Hiura	(Spain) Daniel Ruiz	(United Kingdom) Danny Kent
1	May 2	(Spain) Spanish Grand Prix	Jerez	(Japan) Daijiro Hiura	(Spain) Daniel Ruiz	(Spain) Daniel Ruiz
2	June 5	(Italy) Italian Grand Prix	Mugello Circuit	(Spain) Daniel Ruiz	(Italy) Kevin Calia	(Japan) Daijiro Hiura
3	June 25	(Netherlands) Dutch TT	TT Circuit Assen	(Japan) Daijiro Hiura	(Italy) Kevin Calia	(United States) Jacob Gagne
3	June 26	(Netherlands) Dutch TT	TT Circuit Assen	(Japan) Daijiro Hiura	(Italy) Kevin Calia	(Spain) Daniel Ruiz
4	July 17	(Germany) German Grand Prix	Sachsenring	(United States) Jacob Gagne	(Sweden) Alexander Kristiansson	(United States) Jacob Gagne
4	July 18	(Germany) German Grand Prix	Sachsenring	(United States) Jacob Gagne	(United Kingdom) Danny Kent	(United States) Jacob Gagne
5	August 14	Czech Republic Grand Prix	Brno	(Italy) Alejandro Pardo	(Spain) Daniel Ruiz	(Italy) Kevin Calia
5	August 15	Czech Republic Grand Prix	Brno	(Italy) Alejandro Pardo	(United Kingdom) Harry Stafford	(United States) Jacob Gagne
6	September 4	San Marino Grand Prix	Misano	(United Kingdom) Danny Kent	(United States) Jacob Gagne	(United Kingdom) Danny Kent

== Entry list ==
Notes

- All Entrants were riding a KTM
- Tyres were supplied by Dunlop

No	Rider	Rounds
3	(Austria) Deni Cudic	All
5	(Germany) Philipp Öttl	All
7	(Italy) Alejandro Pardo	All
16	(Australia) Joshua Hook	All
17	(Brazil) Antonio Chiari	All
18	(United Kingdom) James Flitcroft	All
20	(South Africa) Mathew Scholtz	1–2, 5
22	(Spain) Daniel Ruiz	All
23	(Italy) Niccolò Antonelli	All
24	(United Kingdom) Harry Stafford	All
27	(Italy) Alessio Cappella	All
32	(United States) Jacob Gagne	All
34	(Spain) Xavier Pinsach	All
41	(South Africa) Brad Binder	All
46	(Japan) Daijiro Hiura	All
47	(Czech Republic) Tomas Vavrous	All
52	(United Kingdom) Danny Kent	All
57	(Australia) Brody Nowlan	1–2
61	(Australia) Arthur Sissis	All
66	(Germany) Florian Alt	All
72	(Sweden) Alexander Kristiansson	All
74	(Italy) Kevin Calia	All
77	(United Kingdom) Taylor Mackenzie	All
95	(Spain) Xavier Figueras	2–6
98	(France) Alan Techer	1, 5–6

== Season standings ==
=== Scoring system ===
Points are awarded to the top fifteen finishers. Rider has to finish the race to earn points.

Position	1st	2nd	3rd	4th	5th	6th	7th	8th	9th	10th	11th	12th	13th	14th	15th
Points	25	20	16	13	11	10	9	8	7	6	5	4	3	2	1

=== Riders' standings ===
2010 Final Riders' Standings
Pos	Rider	ESP (Spain)		ITA (Italy)	NED (Netherlands)		GER (Germany)		CZE (Czech Republic)		RSM (San Marino)	Pts
1	(United States) Jacob Gagne	5	6	8	1	4	**1**	**1**	8	1	2	**170**
2	(United Kingdom) Danny Kent	1	2	4	11	2	3	12	3	2	**1**	**164**
3	(Japan) Daijiro Hiura	**2**	**3**	1	**5**	**Ret**	15	3	2	Ret	3	**125**
4	(Spain) Daniel Ruiz	3	1	**6**	8	1	7	Ret	5	Ret	5	**115**
5	(South Africa) Brad Binder	4	Ret	3	7	7	2	2	7	4	Ret	**109**
6	(Italy) Kevin Calia	10	Ret	5	2	5	5	Ret	1	Ret	4	**97**
7	(United Kingdom) Harry Stafford	Ret	5	Ret	4	3	Ret	Ret	4	3	6	**79**
8	(Italy) Niccolò Antonelli	7	7	7	15	13	18	13	11	7	8	**56**
9	(Italy) Alessio Cappella	14	13	9	3	10	Ret	Ret	6	Ret	7	**53**
10	(Sweden) Alexander Kristiansson	19	11	11	10	6	4	6	WD	WD	13	**52**
11	(Germany) Florian Alt	6	9	Ret	Ret	14	10	10	9	8	17	**46**
12	(Australia) Joshua Hook	Ret	8	Ret	16	9	6	8	18	6	Ret	**43**
13	(Australia) Arthur Sissis	12	12	15	6	11	11	9	Ret	11	14	**43**
14	(South Africa) Mathew Scholtz	8	4	2	DNS	DNS			Ret	DNS		**41**
15	(United Kingdom) Taylor Mackenzie	15	Ret	12	9	16	9	7	15	5	WD	**40**
16	(Italy) Alejandro Pardo	Ret	10	13	Ret	8	17	4	**Ret**	**16**	Ret	**30**
17	(Czech Republic) Tomáš Vavrouš	11	Ret	14	Ret	Ret	8	5	Ret	Ret	12	**30**
18	(Spain) Xavier Pinsach	17	14	16	12	Ret	12	15	13	9	9	**28**
19	(Germany) Philipp Öttl	16	16	10	13	12	19	11	16	12	16	**22**
20	(Spain) Xavier Figueras	DNS	DNS	Ret	Ret	Ret	14	14	10	13	11	**18**
21	(Brazil) Antonio Chiari	13	Ret	Ret	14	17	Ret	Ret	12	10	Ret	**15**
22	(France) Alan Techer	9	Ret						Ret	DNS	10	**13**
23	(United Kingdom) James Flitcroft	Ret	17	17	17	15	13	16	14	14	15	**9**
24	(Austria) Deni Cudic	18	15	18	Ret	Ret	16	17	17	15	18	**2**
	(Australia) Brody Nowlan	Ret	Ret	Ret								0
Pos	Rider	ESP (Spain)		ITA (Italy)	NED (Netherlands)		GER (Germany)		CZE (Czech Republic)		RSM (San Marino)	Pts

Colour	Result
Gold	Winner
Silver	Second place
Bronze	Third place
Green	Points classification
Blue	Non-points classification
Blue	Non-classified finish (NC)
Purple	Retired, not classified (Ret)
Red	Did not qualify (DNQ)
Red	Did not pre-qualify (DNPQ)
Black	Disqualified (DSQ)
White	Did not start (DNS)
White	Withdrew (WD)
White	Race cancelled (C)
Blank	Did not practice (DNP)
Blank	Did not arrive (DNA)
Blank	Excluded (EX)

**Bold** - Pole
Italics - Fastest Lap
