= Taylor Mackenzie =

British motorcycle racer (born 1993)

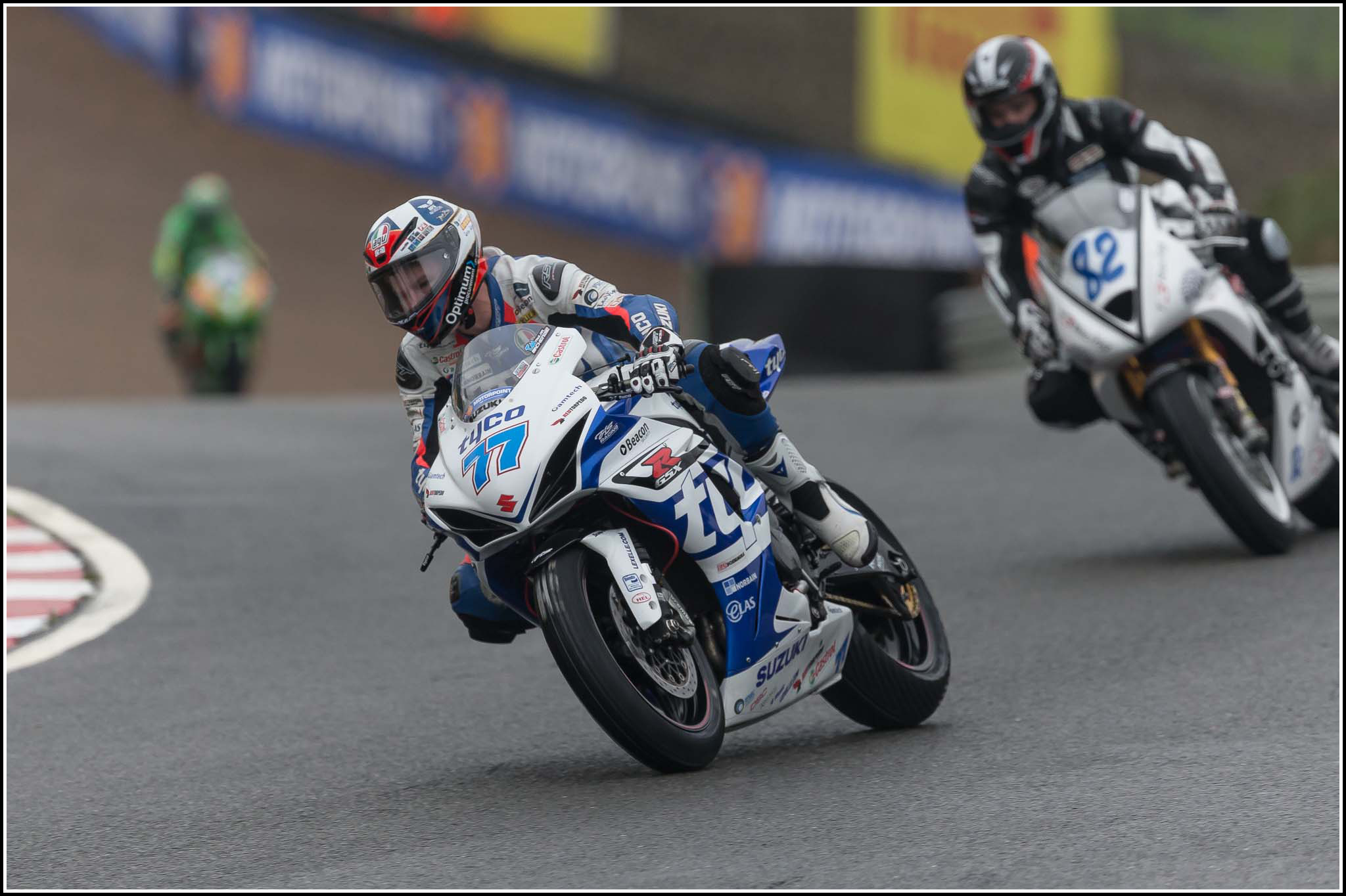
- Mackenzie at the British Supersport final round during qualifying in 2013
- Nationality: British
- Born: 24 February 1993 (age 33); Stirling, Scotland
- Website: taylor-mackenzie.com

Taylor Mackenzie (24 February 1993) is a former Grand Prix motorcycle racer based in Leicestershire, England, the son of a former motorcycle racer Niall Mackenzie and older brother to racer Tarran Mackenzie.

In late 2021, Mackenzie announced his intention to retire from racing at the end of the season. Shortly afterwards, it was announced that from the 2022 season, Mackenzie would be team manager for VisionTrack Honda Moto3, a new team in Moto3 headed by ex-racer Michael Laverty.

In late 2023, Mackenzie announced he would leave MLav Moto3, and for 2024 is a UK-based motorcycle racing track instructor, rider-assistant to brother Tarran Mackenzie racing in World Superbikes, and social media creator for his team, MIE Honda.

== Racing history ==
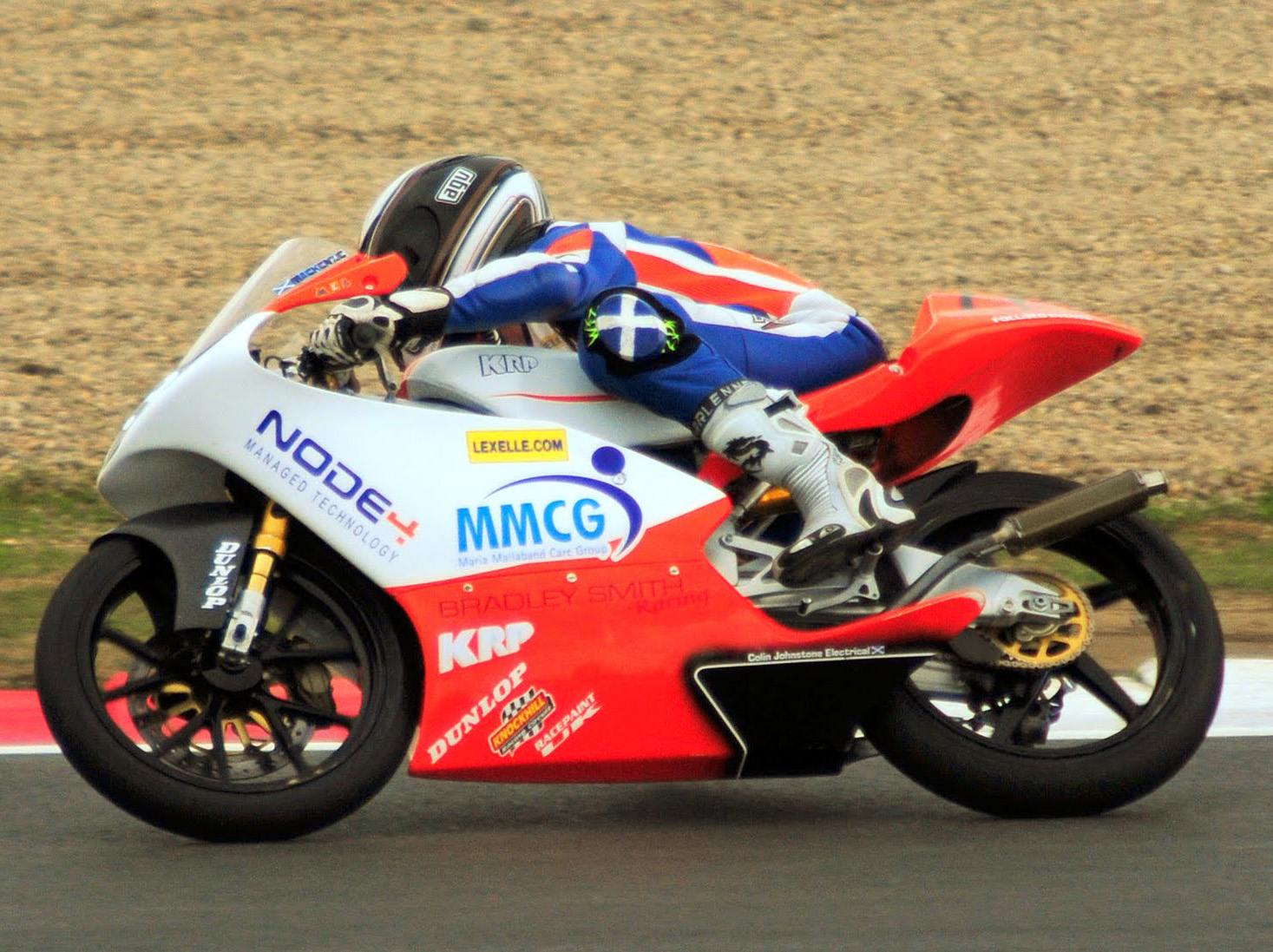
Mackenzie at the 2010 British Grand Prix

In 2010, Mackenzie rode two wildcard entries in the World Championship, at Silverstone and Valencia, prior to his full World Championship in 2011. During 2010, he finished the British 125 Championship in fourth position, competed in two CEV Buckler (Spanish National Championship) rounds and also rode in the Red Bull MotoGP Rookies Cup in which he scored five top-ten finishes.

In 2014, in his second year with Tyco Suzuki, achieved his first ever in the supersport class at Silverstone with a second place finish. In 2016, Mackenzie won the National Superstock 1000 Championship aboard a BMW S1000RR for Hawk Racing/Buildbase BMW, and also won the Mallory Park Race of the Year. In 2017, Mackenzie competed in the British Superbike Championship aboard a Suzuki GSX-R1000. Mackenzie has competed in the British 125GP Championship, the Red Bull MotoGP Rookies Cup, the British Supersport Championship and the British Superbike Championship.

For the first half of the BSB 2018 season, Mackenzie rode for Moto Rapido Racing Ducati replacing injured John Hopkins. The team and Mackenzie announced their mutual decision to part company at the Knockhill BSB round practice session on 7 July, due to the rider's poor results. Mackenzie's place was taken by Tommy Bridewell for the remainder of 2018, who returned the team's best results in the Superbike class, scoring four podium finishes, narrowly missing out on a Showdown place and achieving the Riders' Cup at the season finale. Bridewell was retained for 2019.

For 2020, Mackenzie competed in the British Superbike series, aboard a BMW, after the 2019 season on Superstock 1000. In a February 2021 Motorcycle News interview, he confirmed that he'd had a bad year and he was reliant upon funding provided through YouTube, Patreon and Amazon when trying to arrange a race machine for 2021.

Mackenzie retired from racing at the end of the 2021 British season where he competed in National Superstock 1000, finishing in fifth position.

== Career statistics ==
=== Career highlights ===
- 2013: 10th, British Supersport Championship #77 Suzuki GSX-R600
- 2014: 10th, British Supersport Championship #77 Suzuki GSX-R600
- 2016: 1st, British National Superstock 1000 Championship #77 BMW S1000RR
- 2019: 2nd, British National Superstock 1000 Championship #77 BMW S1000RR

=== British 125cc Championship ===
Year	Bike	1	2	3	4	5	6	7	8	9	10	11	12	13	Pos	Pts
2009	Honda	BHI; 13	OUL	DON; 4	THR	SNE; 13	KNO; 9	MAL	BHGP; 12	CAD; 20	CRO; 9	SIL	OUL; 4		**11th**	**53**
2010	Honda	**BRH**; Ret	THR; 4	OUL; 4	CAD; 1	MAL; 7	KNO; C	SNE	BRH; 2	CAD; Ret	CRO; 14	CRO; 1	**SIL**; Ret	**OUL**; 1	**4th**	**131**

=== Red Bull MotoGP Rookies Cup ===
==== Races by year ====
(key) (Races in bold indicate pole position, races in italics indicate fastest lap)

Year	1	2	3	4	5	6	7	8	9	10	Pos	Pts
2009	SPA1; 19	SPA2; 14	ITA; 15	NED; 21	GER; Ret	GBR; 9	CZE1; Ret	CZE2; Ret			20th	10
2010	SPA1; 15	SPA2; Ret	ITA; 12	NED1; 9	NED2; 16	GER1; 9	GER2; 7	CZE1; 15	CZE2; 5	RSM; WD	15th	40

=== Grand Prix motorcycle racing ===
==== By season ====
Season	Class	Motorcycle	Team	Number	Race	Win	Podium	Pole	FLap	Pts	Plcd
2010	125cc	Honda	KRP MMCG	73	2	0	0	0	0	0	NC
2011	125cc	Aprilia	Phonica Racing	17	16	0	0	0	0	15	24th
Total					**18**	**0**	**0**	**0**	**0**	**15**	

==== Races by year ====
(key) (Races in bold indicate pole position, races in italics indicate fastest lap)

Year	Class	Bike	1	2	3	4	5	6	7	8	9	10	11	12	13	14	15	16	17	Pos	Pts
2010	125cc	Honda	QAT	SPA	FRA	ITA	GBR; Ret	NED	CAT	GER	CZE	IND	RSM	ARA	JPN	MAL	AUS	POR	VAL; 21	NC	0
2011	125cc	Aprilia	QAT; 18	SPA; 5	POR	FRA; 22	CAT; 28	GBR; 12	NED; 26	ITA; 17	GER; Ret	CZE; 21	INP; 21	RSM; 22	ARA; Ret	JPN; Ret	AUS; 18	MAL; 21	VAL; Ret	24th	15

=== British Supersport Championship ===
==== Races by year ====
(key) (Races in bold indicate pole position, races in italics indicate fastest lap)

Year	Bike	1		2		3		4		5		6		7		8		9		10		11		12		Pos	Pts	Ref
Year	Bike	R1	R2	R1	R2	R1	R2	R1	R2	R1	R2	R1	R2	R1	R2	R1	R2	R1	R2	R1	R2	R1	R2	R1	R2	Pos	Pts	Ref
2012	Yamaha	BHI; 21	BHI; Ret	THR; 19	THR; 20	OUL; 20	OUL; 16	SNE; Ret	SNE; Ret	KNO; 19	KNO; 11	OUL; 12	OUL; 14	BHGP; 14	BHGP; 14	CAD; 13	CAD; 15	DON; 9	DON; 9	ASS; 10	ASS; Ret	SIL; Ret	SIL; 8	BHGP; 10	BHGP; 6	14th	63	

=== British Superbike Championship ===
==== By year ====
(key) (Races in bold indicate pole position; races in italics indicate fastest lap)

Year	Bike	1		2		3			4		5		6			7		8			9			10		11		12			Pos	Pts
Year	Bike	R1	R2	R1	R2	R1	R2	R3	R1	R2	R1	R2	R1	R2	R3	R1	R2	R1	R2	R3	R1	R2	R3	R1	R2	R1	R2	R1	R2	R3	Pos	Pts
2015	Kawasaki	DON; Ret	DON; Ret	BHI; Ret	BHI; 28	OUL; 18	OUL; 20		SNE; Ret	SNE; Ret	KNO; 16	KNO; 19	BHGP; Ret	BHGP; 20		THR; 16	THR; 16	CAD	CAD		OUL; 22	OUL; 18	OUL; 22	ASS; 19	ASS; 19	SIL; Ret	SIL; 22	BHGP; Ret	BHGP; 19	BHGP; 16	NC	0
2017	Suzuki	DON; Ret	DON; Ret	BHI; 15	BHI; 14	OUL; 18	OUL; 15		KNO; 5	KNO; 11	SNE; Ret	SNE; Ret	BHGP; Ret	BHGP; 15		THR; 13	THR; DNS	CAD; 15	CAD; 15		SIL; 7	SIL; Ret	SIL; DNS	OUL	OUL	ASS; DNS	ASS; DNS	BHGP	BHGP	BHGP	19th	35
2018	Ducati	DON; 15	DON; 16	BHI; 17	BHI; 15	OUL; Ret	OUL; 14		SNE; 11	SNE; 12	KNO; DNS	KNO; DNS	BHGP	BHGP		THR	THR	CAD	CAD		SIL	SIL	SIL	OUL	OUL	ASS	ASS	BHGP	BHGP	BHGP	23rd	13

Year	Bike	1		2		3			4		5		6		7		8		9			10		11		12			Pos	Pts
Year	Bike	R1	R2	R1	R2	R1	R2	R3	R1	R2	R1	R2	R1	R2	R1	R2	R1	R2	R1	R2	R3	R1	R2	R1	R2	R1	R2	R3	Pos	Pts
2019	BMW	SIL	SIL	OUL	OUL	DON	DON	DON	BRH	BRH	KNO	KNO	SNE	SNE	THR	THR	CAD	CAD	OUL	OUL	OUL	ASS	ASS	DON; DNS	DON; DNS	BHGP; 10	BHGP; 10	BHGP; 11	23rd	17

Year	Bike	1			2			3			4			5			6			7			8			9			10			11			Pos	Pts
Year	Bike	R1	R2	R3	R1	R2	R3	R1	R2	R3	R1	R2	R3	R1	R2	R3	R1	R2	R3	R1	R2	R3	R1	R2	R3	R1	R2	R3	R1	R2	R3	R1	R2	R3	Pos	Pts
2020	BMW	DON; 15	DON; 22	DON; 17	SNE; 18	SNE; Ret	SNE; Ret	SIL; 16	SIL; 16	SIL; 18	OUL; 16	OUL; Ret	OUL; 20	DON; 20	DON; 12	DON; 17	BHGP; 17	BHGP; 14	BHGP; 16																21st	7
