= Santiago Hernández =

Colombian motorcycle racer

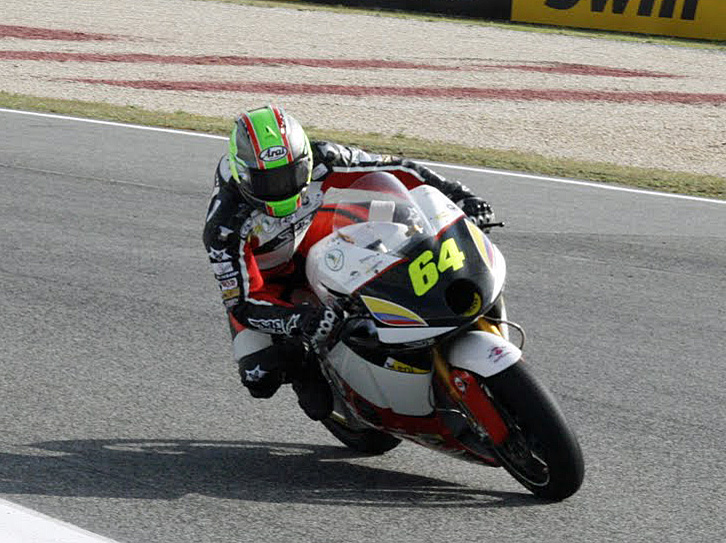
- Hernández at the 2011 Portuguese Grand Prix
- Nationality: Colombian
- Born: 11 September 1992 (age 34); Medellín, Colombia
Motorcycle racing career statistics
Moto2 World Championship
Active years	2010–2011
Manufacturers	Moriwaki, FTR
Starts / Wins / Podiums / Poles / F. laps / Points; 17 / 0 / 0 / 0 / 0 / 0

Santiago Hernández Vega (born 11 September 1992 in Medellín) is a Colombian former Grand Prix motorcycle racer, and the younger brother of former MotoGP racer Yonny Hernández. He has previously raced in the Spanish CEV Moto2 Series and in the Spanish Supersport Championship.

== Career ==
=== Moto2 World Championship ===
==== 2010 ====
Hernández participated in his first Grand Prix race at the age of 18, at the 2010 Aragon Grand Prix. Riding for Matteoni C.P. Racing as a replacement for Lukas Pesek, on a Moriwaki MD600 in the Moto2 class, he finished 23rd out of 28 riders, 45 seconds behind winner Andrea Iannone. He was the fourth out of five Moriwaki mounted riders who finished the race. He was then replaced for the next race by Ferruccio Lamborghini.

==== 2011 ====
In 2011, Hernández joined the Thai Honda Singha SAG SAG Team and raced a FTR Moto M211. He raced 16 out of 17 races, and scored a best of 21st place, thus failing to score points. He was even replaced by Raffaele de Rosa for one race, who also scored a 21st place in his only race with the FTR bike.

For 2012, Hernández was left without a contract and he left the world championships.

== Career statistics ==
=== Grand Prix motorcycle racing ===
==== By season ====
Season	Class	Motorcycle	Team	Number	Race	Win	Podium	Pole	FLap	Pts	Plcd
2010	Moto2	Moriwaki	Matteoni CP Racing	64	1	0	0	0	0	0	NC
2011	Moto2	FTR	SAG Team	64	16	0	0	0	0	0	NC
Total					**17**	**0**	**0**	**0**	**0**	**0**	

==== Races by year ====
(key) (Races in bold indicate pole position; races in italics indicate fastest lap)

Year	Class	Bike	1	2	3	4	5	6	7	8	9	10	11	12	13	14	15	16	17	Pos	Pts
2010	Moto2	Moriwaki	QAT	SPA	FRA	ITA	GBR	NED	CAT	GER	CZE	INP	RSM	ARA; 23	JPN	MAL	AUS	POR	VAL	NC	0
2011	Moto2	FTR	QAT; Ret	SPA; 31	POR; 24	FRA; Ret	CAT; 21	GBR	NED; Ret	ITA; 30	GER; 24	CZE; 27	INP; 33	RSM; 24	ARA; 26	JPN; Ret	AUS; 26	MAL; Ret	VAL; 22	NC	0
