= Alejandro Pardo =

Italian motorcycle racer

- Nationality: Italian
- Born: 9 September 1993 (age 33); Barcelona, Spain
Motorcycle racing career statistics
125cc World Championship
Active years	2010
Manufacturers	Aprilia
Starts / Wins / Podiums / Poles / F. laps / Points; 1 / 0 / 0 / 0 / 0 / 0

Manuel Alejandro Pardo (born 9 September 1993) is an Italian motorcycle racer. In 2009 and 2010 he competed in the Red Bull MotoGP Rookies Cup.

== Career statistics ==
=== Red Bull MotoGP Rookies Cup ===
==== Races by year ====
(key) (Races in bold indicate pole position, races in italics indicate fastest lap)

Year	1	2	3	4	5	6	7	8	9	10	Pos	Pts
2009	SPA1; 6	SPA2; 5	ITA; Ret	NED; 14	GER; 7	GBR; Ret	CZE1; 3	CZE2; Ret			10th	48
2010	SPA1; Ret	SPA2; 10	ITA; 13	NED1; Ret	NED2; 8	GER1; 17	GER2; 4	**CZE1**; Ret	**CZE2**; 16	RSM; Ret	16th	30

=== Grand Prix motorcycle racing ===
==== By season ====
Season	Class	Motorcycle	Team	Race	Win	Podium	Pole	FLap	Pts	Plcd
2010	125cc	Aprilia	Matteoni CP Racing	1	0	0	0	0	0	NC
Total				**1**	**0**	**0**	**0**	**0**	**0**	

==== Races by year ====
(key)

Year	Class	Bike	1	2	3	4	5	6	7	8	9	10	11	12	13	14	15	16	17	Pos.	Pts
2010	125cc	Aprilia	QAT	SPA	FRA	ITA	GBR	NED	CAT	GER	CZE	INP	RSM	ARA; 21	JPN	MAL	AUS	POR	VAL	NC	0
