= 2011 Italian motorcycle Grand Prix =

(Italy) 2011 Italian Grand Prix
Race details
- Race 8 of 18 races in the 2011 Grand Prix motorcycle racing season
- Date: 3 July 2011
- Official name: Gran Premio d'Italia TIM
- Location: Mugello Circuit
- Course: Permanent racing facility; 5.245 km (3.259 mi)

MotoGP
Pole position
- Rider: (Australia) Casey Stoner
- Time: 1:48.034
Fastest lap
- Rider: (Spain) Jorge Lorenzo
- Time: 1:48.402
Podium
- First: (Spain) Jorge Lorenzo
- Second: (Italy) Andrea Dovizioso
- Third: (Australia) Casey Stoner

Moto2
Pole position
- Rider: (Spain) Marc Márquez
- Time: 2:05.312
Fastest lap
- Rider: (Germany) Stefan Bradl
- Time: 1:53.362
Podium
- First: (Spain) Marc Márquez
- Second: (Germany) Stefan Bradl
- Third: (United Kingdom) Bradley Smith

125cc
Pole position
- Rider: (France) Johann Zarco
- Time: 1:58.988
Fastest lap
- Rider: (France) Johann Zarco
- Time: 1:57.783
Podium
- First: (Spain) Nicolás Terol
- Second: (France) Johann Zarco
- Third: (Spain) Maverick Viñales

The 2011 Italian motorcycle Grand Prix was the eighth round of the 2011 Grand Prix motorcycle racing season. It took place on the weekend of 1–3 July 2011 at the Mugello Circuit.

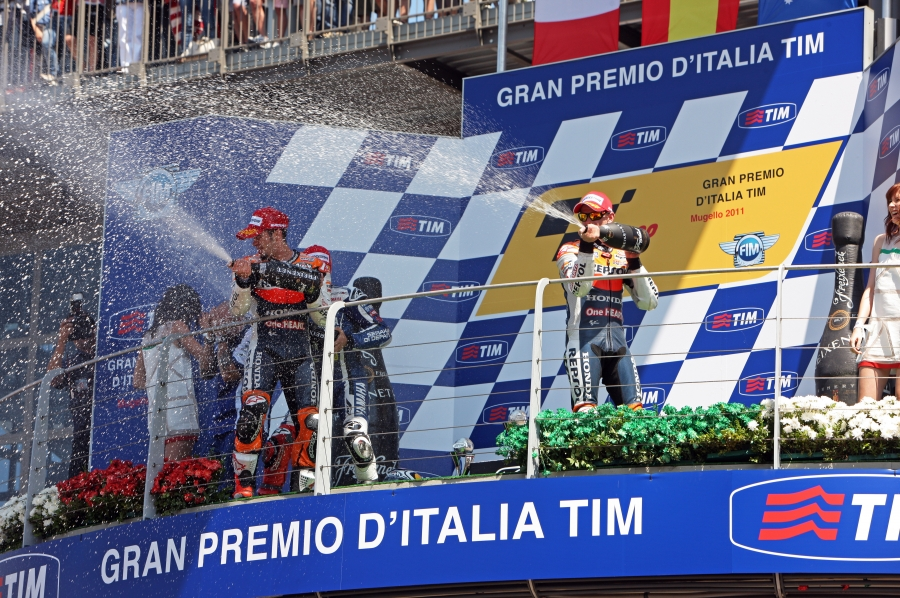
Jorge Lorenzo, Andrea Dovizioso and Casey Stoner, spraying the champagne on the podium after finishing first, second and third at the MotoGP race.

== MotoGP classification ==
| Pos. | No. | Rider | Team | Manufacturer | Laps | Time/Retired | Grid | Points |
|---|---|---|---|---|---|---|---|---|
| 1 | 1 | (Spain) Jorge Lorenzo | Yamaha Factory Racing | Yamaha | 23 | 41:50.089 | 5 | 25 |
| 2 | 4 | (Italy) Andrea Dovizioso | Repsol Honda Team | Honda | 23 | +0.997 | 4 | 20 |
| 3 | 27 | (Australia) Casey Stoner | Repsol Honda Team | Honda | 23 | +1.143 | 1 | 16 |
| 4 | 11 | (United States) Ben Spies | Yamaha Factory Racing | Yamaha | 23 | +8.980 | 2 | 13 |
| 5 | 58 | (Italy) Marco Simoncelli | San Carlo Honda Gresini | Honda | 23 | +9.076 | 3 | 11 |
| 6 | 46 | (Italy) Valentino Rossi | Ducati Team | Ducati | 23 | +26.450 | 12 | 10 |
| 7 | 8 | (Spain) Héctor Barberá | Mapfre Aspar Team MotoGP | Ducati | 23 | +28.745 | 10 | 9 |
| 8 | 26 | (Spain) Dani Pedrosa | Repsol Honda Team | Honda | 23 | +32.043 | 8 | 8 |
| 9 | 5 | (United States) Colin Edwards | Monster Yamaha Tech 3 | Yamaha | 23 | +33.421 | 6 | 7 |
| 10 | 69 | (United States) Nicky Hayden | Ducati Team | Ducati | 23 | +34.724 | 9 | 6 |
| 11 | 7 | (Japan) Hiroshi Aoyama | San Carlo Honda Gresini | Honda | 23 | +37.359 | 13 | 5 |
| 12 | 17 | (Czech Republic) Karel Abraham | Cardion AB Motoracing | Ducati | 23 | +43.964 | 11 | 4 |
| 13 | 19 | (Spain) Álvaro Bautista | Rizla Suzuki MotoGP | Suzuki | 23 | +47.654 | 14 | 3 |
| 14 | 14 | (France) Randy de Puniet | Pramac Racing Team | Ducati | 23 | +48.840 | 15 | 2 |
| 15 | 24 | (Spain) Toni Elías | LCR Honda MotoGP | Honda | 23 | +1:15.199 | 16 | 1 |
| Ret | 35 | (United Kingdom) Cal Crutchlow | Monster Yamaha Tech 3 | Yamaha | 6 | Technical | 7 | |

== Moto2 classification ==
| Pos. | No. | Rider | Manufacturer | Laps | Time/Retired | Grid | Points |
|---|---|---|---|---|---|---|---|
| 1 | 93 | (Spain) Marc Márquez | Suter | 21 | 40:02.941 | 1 | 25 |
| 2 | 65 | (Germany) Stefan Bradl | Kalex | 21 | +0.071 | 7 | 20 |
| 3 | 38 | (United Kingdom) Bradley Smith | Tech 3 | 21 | +0.419 | 3 | 16 |
| 4 | 15 | (San Marino) Alex de Angelis | Motobi | 21 | +2.091 | 2 | 13 |
| 5 | 29 | (Italy) Andrea Iannone | Suter | 21 | +4.595 | 14 | 11 |
| 6 | 12 | (Switzerland) Thomas Lüthi | Suter | 21 | +13.021 | 24 | 10 |
| 7 | 3 | (Italy) Simone Corsi | FTR | 21 | +13.092 | 23 | 9 |
| 8 | 76 | (Germany) Max Neukirchner | MZ-RE Honda | 21 | +13.409 | 20 | 8 |
| 9 | 40 | (Spain) Aleix Espargaró | Pons Kalex | 21 | +14.139 | 32 | 7 |
| 10 | 54 | (Turkey) Kenan Sofuoğlu | Suter | 21 | +14.419 | 13 | 6 |
| 11 | 77 | (Switzerland) Dominique Aegerter | Suter | 21 | +15.072 | 30 | 5 |
| 12 | 19 | (Belgium) Xavier Siméon | Tech 3 | 21 | +17.996 | 4 | 4 |
| 13 | 4 | (Switzerland) Randy Krummenacher | Kalex | 21 | +18.573 | 5 | 3 |
| 14 | 72 | (Japan) Yuki Takahashi | Moriwaki | 21 | +19.720 | 15 | 2 |
| 15 | 16 | (France) Jules Cluzel | Suter | 21 | +20.357 | 33 | 1 |
| 16 | 34 | (Spain) Esteve Rabat | FTR | 21 | +22.208 | 11 | |
| 17 | 36 | (Finland) Mika Kallio | Suter | 21 | +22.420 | 9 | |
| 18 | 53 | (France) Valentin Debise | FTR | 21 | +24.297 | 38 | |
| 19 | 18 | (Spain) Jordi Torres | Suter | 21 | +28.679 | 18 | |
| 20 | 75 | (Italy) Mattia Pasini | FTR | 21 | +28.876 | 8 | |
| 21 | 13 | (Australia) Anthony West | MZ-RE Honda | 21 | +30.778 | 10 | |
| 22 | 88 | (Spain) Ricard Cardús | Moriwaki | 21 | +33.084 | 17 | |
| 23 | 71 | (Italy) Claudio Corti | Suter | 21 | +34.568 | 31 | |
| 24 | 63 | (France) Mike Di Meglio | Tech 3 | 21 | +36.000 | 35 | |
| 25 | 31 | (Spain) Carmelo Morales | Moriwaki | 21 | +36.194 | 27 | |
| 26 | 39 | (Venezuela) Robertino Pietri | Suter | 21 | +36.195 | 12 | |
| 27 | 45 | (United Kingdom) Scott Redding | Suter | 21 | +46.731 | 28 | |
| 28 | 44 | (Spain) Pol Espargaró | FTR | 21 | +49.054 | 6 | |
| 29 | 9 | (United States) Kenny Noyes | FTR | 21 | +50.101 | 22 | |
| 30 | 64 | (Colombia) Santiago Hernández | FTR | 21 | +1:08.557 | 36 | |
| 31 | 95 | (Qatar) Mashel Al Naimi | Moriwaki | 20 | +1 lap | 37 | |
| Ret | 14 | (Thailand) Ratthapark Wilairot | FTR | 14 | Retirement | 34 | |
| Ret | 25 | (Italy) Alex Baldolini | Suter | 11 | Retirement | 26 | |
| Ret | 70 | (Italy) Mattia Tarozzi | Suter | 11 | Retirement | 29 | |
| Ret | 68 | (Colombia) Yonny Hernández | FTR | 7 | Accident | 16 | |
| Ret | 24 | (Italy) Tommaso Lorenzetti | FTR | 6 | Accident | 25 | |
| Ret | 51 | (Italy) Michele Pirro | Moriwaki | 3 | Accident | 21 | |
| Ret | 35 | (Italy) Raffaele de Rosa | Suter | 0 | Accident | 19 | |
| DNS | 80 | (Spain) Axel Pons | Pons Kalex | | Did not start | | |
OFFICIAL MOTO2 REPORT

== 125 cc classification ==
| Pos. | No. | Rider | Manufacturer | Laps | Time/Retired | Grid | Points |
|---|---|---|---|---|---|---|---|
| 1 | 18 | (Spain) Nicolás Terol | Aprilia | 20 | 39:51.815 | 5 | 25 |
| 2 | 5 | (France) Johann Zarco | Derbi | 20 | +0.167 | 1 | 20 |
| 3 | 25 | (Spain) Maverick Viñales | Aprilia | 20 | +8.379 | 7 | 16 |
| 4 | 7 | (Spain) Efrén Vázquez | Derbi | 20 | +8.491 | 4 | 13 |
| 5 | 55 | (Spain) Héctor Faubel | Aprilia | 20 | +8.594 | 8 | 11 |
| 6 | 39 | (Spain) Luis Salom | Aprilia | 20 | +22.908 | 2 | 10 |
| 7 | 33 | (Spain) Sergio Gadea | Aprilia | 20 | +23.989 | 3 | 9 |
| 8 | 44 | (Portugal) Miguel Oliveira | Aprilia | 20 | +40.138 | 11 | 8 |
| 9 | 23 | (Spain) Alberto Moncayo | Aprilia | 20 | +40.767 | 16 | 7 |
| 10 | 84 | (Czech Republic) Jakub Kornfeil | Aprilia | 20 | +41.198 | 15 | 6 |
| 11 | 77 | (Germany) Marcel Schrötter | Mahindra | 20 | +41.255 | 13 | 5 |
| 12 | 11 | (Germany) Sandro Cortese | Aprilia | 20 | +43.999 (Note: Cortese was penalised 20 seconds after the race for an illegal manoeuvre.) | 6 | 4 |
| 13 | 15 | (Italy) Simone Grotzkyj | Aprilia | 20 | +46.172 | 14 | 3 |
| 14 | 53 | (Netherlands) Jasper Iwema | Aprilia | 20 | +58.976 | 19 | 2 |
| 15 | 52 | (United Kingdom) Danny Kent | Aprilia | 20 | +59.725 | 26 | 1 |
| 16 | 10 | (France) Alexis Masbou | KTM | 20 | +1:00.127 | 20 | |
| 17 | 17 | (United Kingdom) Taylor Mackenzie | Aprilia | 20 | +1:00.227 | 28 | |
| 18 | 63 | (Malaysia) Zulfahmi Khairuddin | Derbi | 20 | +1:08.245 | 25 | |
| 19 | 95 | (Czech Republic) Miroslav Popov | Aprilia | 20 | +1:10.593 | 27 | |
| 20 | 19 | (Italy) Alessandro Tonucci | Aprilia | 20 | +1:13.662 | 30 | |
| 21 | 43 | (Italy) Francesco Mauriello | Aprilia | 20 | +1:23.949 | 29 | |
| 22 | 31 | (Finland) Niklas Ajo | Aprilia | 20 | +1:38.811 | 23 | |
| 23 | 30 | (Switzerland) Giulian Pedone | Aprilia | 20 | +1:53.144 | 31 | |
| Ret | 3 | (Italy) Luigi Morciano | Aprilia | 19 | Collision | 24 | |
| Ret | 74 | (Italy) Kevin Calia | Aprilia | 19 | Collision | 22 | |
| Ret | 94 | (Germany) Jonas Folger | Aprilia | 17 | Accident | 21 | |
| Ret | 99 | (United Kingdom) Danny Webb | Mahindra | 9 | Retirement | 12 | |
| Ret | 56 | (Hungary) Peter Sebestyén | KTM | 9 | Accident | 32 | |
| Ret | 96 | (France) Louis Rossi | Aprilia | 7 | Retirement | 10 | |
| Ret | 36 | (Spain) Joan Perelló | Aprilia | 7 | Retirement | 33 | |
| Ret | 50 | (Norway) Sturla Fagerhaug | Aprilia | 7 | Retirement | 18 | |
| Ret | 88 | (Italy) Massimo Parziani | Aprilia | 6 | Retirement | 34 | |
| Ret | 26 | (Spain) Adrián Martín | Aprilia | 1 | Accident | 9 | |
| Ret | 21 | (United Kingdom) Harry Stafford | Aprilia | 1 | Accident | 17 | |
OFFICIAL 125cc REPORT

== Championship standings after the race (MotoGP) ==
Below are the standings for the top five riders and constructors after round eight has concluded.

Riders' Championship standings

| Pos. | Rider | Points |
|---|---|---|
| 1 | (Australia) Casey Stoner | 152 |
| 2 | (Spain) Jorge Lorenzo | 133 |
| 3 | (Italy) Andrea Dovizioso | 119 |
| 4 | (Italy) Valentino Rossi | 91 |
| 5 | (United States) Nicky Hayden | 77 |

Constructors' Championship standings

| Pos. | Constructor | Points |
|---|---|---|
| 1 | (Japan) Honda | 185 |
| 2 | (Japan) Yamaha | 164 |
| 3 | (Italy) Ducati | 99 |
| 4 | (Japan) Suzuki | 36 |

- Note: Only the top five positions are included for both sets of standings.

| Previous race: 2011 Dutch TT | FIM Grand Prix World Championship; 2011 season | Next race: 2011 German Grand Prix |
| Previous race: 2010 Italian Grand Prix | Italian motorcycle Grand Prix | Next race: 2012 Italian Grand Prix |
