= 2011 San Marino and Rimini Riviera motorcycle Grand Prix =

Motorcycle race

2011 San Marino and Rimini Riviera Grand Prix
Race details
- Race 13 of 18 races in the 2011 Grand Prix motorcycle racing season
- Date: 4 September 2011
- Official name: Gran Premio Aperol di San Marino e della Riviera di Rimini
- Location: Misano World Circuit
- Course: Permanent racing facility; 4.226 km (2.626 mi)

MotoGP
Pole position
- Rider: (Australia) Casey Stoner
- Time: 1:33.138
Fastest lap
- Rider: (Spain) Jorge Lorenzo
- Time: 1:33.906
Podium
- First: (Spain) Jorge Lorenzo
- Second: (Spain) Dani Pedrosa
- Third: (Australia) Casey Stoner

Moto2
Pole position
- Rider: (Germany) Stefan Bradl
- Time: 1:37.828
Fastest lap
- Rider: (Italy) Andrea Iannone
- Time: 1:38.609
Podium
- First: (Spain) Marc Márquez
- Second: (Germany) Stefan Bradl
- Third: (Italy) Andrea Iannone

125cc
Pole position
- Rider: (France) Johann Zarco
- Time: 1:43.247
Fastest lap
- Rider: (France) Johann Zarco
- Time: 1:43.379
Podium
- First: (Spain) Nicolás Terol
- Second: (France) Johann Zarco
- Third: (Spain) Efrén Vázquez

The 2011 San Marino and Rimini Riviera motorcycle Grand Prix was the thirteenth round of the 2011 Grand Prix motorcycle racing season. It took place on the weekend of 2–4 September 2011 at the Misano World Circuit.

== MotoGP classification ==
Pos.	No.	Rider	Team	Manufacturer	Laps	Time/Retired	Grid	Points
1	1	(Spain) Jorge Lorenzo	Yamaha Factory Racing	Yamaha	28	44:11.877	2	25
2	26	(Spain) Dani Pedrosa	Repsol Honda Team	Honda	28	+7.299	3	20
3	27	(Australia) Casey Stoner	Repsol Honda Team	Honda	28	+11.967	1	16
4	58	(Italy) Marco Simoncelli	San Carlo Honda Gresini	Honda	28	+17.353	5	13
5	4	(Italy) Andrea Dovizioso	Repsol Honda Team	Honda	28	+17.390	6	11
6	11	(United States) Ben Spies	Yamaha Factory Racing	Yamaha	28	+18.092	4	10
7	46	(Italy) Valentino Rossi	Ducati Team	Ducati	28	+23.703	11	9
8	19	(Spain) Álvaro Bautista	Rizla Suzuki MotoGP	Suzuki	28	+30.678	8	8
9	8	(Spain) Héctor Barberá	Mapfre Aspar Team MotoGP	Ducati	28	+37.502	9	7
10	35	(United Kingdom) Cal Crutchlow	Monster Yamaha Tech 3	Yamaha	28	+37.720	13	6
11	7	(Japan) Hiroshi Aoyama	San Carlo Honda Gresini	Honda	28	+39.548	10	5
12	17	(Czech Republic) Karel Abraham	Cardion AB Motoracing	Ducati	28	+40.506	12	4
13	5	(United States) Colin Edwards	Monster Yamaha Tech 3	Yamaha	28	+53.349	7	3
14	14	(France) Randy de Puniet	Pramac Racing Team	Ducati	28	+1:02.366	14	2
15	24	(Spain) Toni Elías	LCR Honda MotoGP	Honda	28	+1:20.156	17	1
Ret	65	(Italy) Loris Capirossi	Pramac Racing Team	Ducati	8	Retirement	16	
Ret	69	(United States) Nicky Hayden	Ducati Team	Ducati	2	Accident	15	

== Moto2 classification ==
Pos.	No.	Rider	Manufacturer	Laps	Time/Retired	Grid	Points
1	93	(Spain) Marc Márquez	Suter	26	43:08.197	2	25
2	65	(Germany) Stefan Bradl	Kalex	26	+0.619	1	20
3	29	(Italy) Andrea Iannone	Suter	26	+0.713	7	16
4	15	(San Marino) Alex de Angelis	Motobi	26	+1.634	5	13
5	45	(United Kingdom) Scott Redding	Suter	26	+3.275	4	11
6	38	(United Kingdom) Bradley Smith	Tech 3	26	+3.436	6	10
7	72	(Japan) Yuki Takahashi	Moriwaki	26	+5.255	3	9
8	12	(Switzerland) Thomas Lüthi	Suter	26	+8.739	10	8
9	44	(Spain) Pol Espargaró	FTR	26	+13.224	9	7
10	3	(Italy) Simone Corsi	FTR	26	+13.551	15	6
11	34	(Spain) Esteve Rabat	FTR	26	+17.533	16	5
12	60	(Spain) Julián Simón	Suter	26	+18.163	14	4
13	77	(Switzerland) Dominique Aegerter	Suter	26	+18.254	29	3
14	51	(Italy) Michele Pirro	Moriwaki	26	+19.180	8	2
15	36	(Finland) Mika Kallio	Suter	26	+24.454	26	1
16	63	(France) Mike Di Meglio	Tech 3	26	+24.858	18	
17	75	(Italy) Mattia Pasini	FTR	26	+24.992	13	
18	71	(Italy) Claudio Corti	Suter	26	+35.358	20	
19	4	(Switzerland) Randy Krummenacher	Kalex	26	+35.800	19	
20	7	(Japan) Tomoyoshi Koyama	Suter	26	+37.371	28	
21	88	(Spain) Ricard Cardús	Moriwaki	26	+37.484	27	
22	35	(Italy) Raffaele De Rosa	Suter	26	+47.904	22	
23	9	(United States) Kenny Noyes	FTR	26	+48.833	36	
24	64	(Colombia) Santiago Hernández	FTR	26	+56.858	32	
25	53	(France) Valentin Debise	FTR	26	+1:06.771	33	
26	6	(Spain) Joan Olivé	FTR	26	+1:07.053	31	
27	13	(Australia) Anthony West	MZ-RE Honda	26	+1:13.378	24	
28	32	(United States) Jacob Gagne	FTR	26	+1:21.741	37	
29	22	(Italy) Alessandro Andreozzi	FTR	26	+1:30.644	30	
30	95	(Qatar) Mashel Al Naimi	Moriwaki	25	+1 lap	38	
Ret	40	(Spain) Aleix Espargaró	Pons Kalex	13	Retirement	12	
Ret	76	(Germany) Max Neukirchner	MZ-RE Honda	13	Retirement	17	
Ret	31	(Spain) Carmelo Morales	Moriwaki	12	Retirement	35	
Ret	16	(France) Jules Cluzel	Suter	6	Accident	11	
Ret	25	(Italy) Alex Baldolini	Pons Kalex	0	Collision	21	
Ret	19	(Belgium) Xavier Siméon	Tech 3	0	Collision	23	
Ret	39	(Venezuela) Robertino Pietri	Suter	0	Collision	25	
Ret	14	(Thailand) Ratthapark Wilairot	FTR	0	Collision	34	
DNS	18	(Spain) Jordi Torres	Suter		Injured		
OFFICIAL MOTO2 REPORT

== 125 cc classification ==
Pos.	No.	Rider	Manufacturer	Laps	Time/Retired	Grid	Points
1	18	(Spain) Nicolás Terol	Aprilia	23	40:02.164	3	25
2	5	(France) Johann Zarco	Derbi	23	+0.022	1	20
3	7	(Spain) Efrén Vázquez	Derbi	23	+4.932	11	16
4	11	(Germany) Sandro Cortese	Aprilia	23	+9.322	4	13
5	55	(Spain) Héctor Faubel	Aprilia	23	+9.964	2	11
6	52	(United Kingdom) Danny Kent	Aprilia	23	+12.100	5	10
7	25	(Spain) Maverick Viñales	Aprilia	23	+12.324	10	9
8	33	(Spain) Sergio Gadea	Aprilia	23	+12.556	13	8
9	94	(Germany) Jonas Folger	Aprilia	23	+21.489	7	7
10	44	(Portugal) Miguel Oliveira	Aprilia	23	+30.678	9	6
11	23	(Spain) Alberto Moncayo	Aprilia	23	+31.321	12	5
12	84	(Czech Republic) Jakub Kornfeil	Aprilia	23	+31.552	17	4
13	95	(Czech Republic) Miroslav Popov	Aprilia	23	+32.637	6	3
14	3	(Italy) Luigi Morciano	Aprilia	23	+52.542	14	2
15	77	(Germany) Marcel Schrötter	Mahindra	23	+53.850	15	1
16	74	(Italy) Kevin Calia	Aprilia	23	+53.917	28	
17	19	(Italy) Alessandro Tonucci	Aprilia	23	+58.742	22	
18	60	(Italy) Manuel Tatasciore	Aprilia	23	+1:03.723	27	
19	27	(Italy) Alessandro Giorgi	Aprilia	23	+1:04.113	25	
20	10	(France) Alexis Masbou	KTM	23	+1:04.956	26	
21	99	(United Kingdom) Danny Webb	Mahindra	23	+1:08.795	19	
22	17	(United Kingdom) Taylor Mackenzie	Aprilia	23	+1:08.846	34	
23	30	(Switzerland) Giulian Pedone	Aprilia	23	+1:17.719	32	
24	8	(Australia) Jack Miller	KTM	23	+1:18.752	30	
25	36	(Spain) Joan Perelló	Aprilia	23	+1:36.950	33	
26	26	(Spain) Adrián Martín	Aprilia	21	+2 laps	18	
27	63	(Malaysia) Zulfahmi Khairuddin	Derbi	20	+3 laps	16	
Ret	50	(Norway) Sturla Fagerhaug	Aprilia	17	Retirement	29	
Ret	53	(Netherlands) Jasper Iwema	Aprilia	10	Accident	21	
Ret	88	(Italy) Massimo Parziani	Aprilia	10	Retirement	24	
Ret	39	(Spain) Luis Salom	Aprilia	7	Retirement	8	
Ret	43	(Italy) Francesco Mauriello	Aprilia	3	Accident	31	
Ret	21	(United Kingdom) Harry Stafford	Aprilia	0	Accident	20	
Ret	96	(France) Louis Rossi	Aprilia	0	Accident	23	
DNS	15	(Italy) Simone Grotzkyj	Aprilia		Injured		
DNS	31	(Finland) Niklas Ajo	Aprilia		Injured		
OFFICIAL 125cc REPORT

== Championship standings after the race (MotoGP) ==
Below are the standings for the top five riders and constructors after round thirteen has concluded.

Riders' Championship standings

Pos.	Rider	Points
1	(Australia) Casey Stoner	259
2	(Spain) Jorge Lorenzo	224
3	(Italy) Andrea Dovizioso	185
4	(Spain) Dani Pedrosa	150
5	(United States) Ben Spies	135

Constructors' Championship standings

Pos.	Constructor	Points
1	(Japan) Honda	305
2	(Japan) Yamaha	258
3	(Italy) Ducati	144
4	(Japan) Suzuki	63

- Note: Only the top five positions are included for both sets of standings.

Previous race: 2011 Indianapolis Grand Prix	FIM Grand Prix World Championship; 2011 season	Next race: 2011 Aragon Grand Prix
Previous race: 2010 San Marino Grand Prix	San Marino and Rimini Riviera motorcycle Grand Prix	Next race: 2012 San Marino Grand Prix
