= 2011 Aragon motorcycle Grand Prix =

2011 Aragon Grand Prix
Race details
- Race 14 of 18 races in the 2011 Grand Prix motorcycle racing season
- Date: 18 September 2011
- Official name: Gran Premio de Aragón
- Location: MotorLand Aragón
- Course: Permanent racing facility; 5.078 km (3.155 mi)

MotoGP
Pole position
- Rider: (Australia) Casey Stoner
- Time: 1:48.451
Fastest lap
- Rider: (Australia) Casey Stoner
- Time: 1:49.046
Podium
- First: (Australia) Casey Stoner
- Second: (Spain) Dani Pedrosa
- Third: (Spain) Jorge Lorenzo

Moto2
Pole position
- Rider: (Spain) Marc Márquez
- Time: 1:53.296
Fastest lap
- Rider: (Spain) Marc Márquez
- Time: 1:53.956
Podium
- First: (Spain) Marc Márquez
- Second: (Italy) Andrea Iannone
- Third: (Italy) Simone Corsi

125cc
Pole position
- Rider: (Spain) Héctor Faubel
- Time: 1:59.222
Fastest lap
- Rider: (Spain) Maverick Viñales
- Time: 1:59.835
Podium
- First: (Spain) Nicolás Terol
- Second: (France) Johann Zarco
- Third: (Spain) Maverick Viñales

The 2011 Aragon motorcycle Grand Prix was the fourteenth round of the 2011 Grand Prix motorcycle racing season. It took place on the weekend of 16–18 September 2011 at the MotorLand Aragón circuit.

== MotoGP classification ==
Pos.	No.	Rider	Team	Manufacturer	Laps	Time/Retired	Grid	Points
1	27	(Australia) Casey Stoner	Repsol Honda Team	Honda	23	42:17.427	1	25
2	26	(Spain) Dani Pedrosa	Repsol Honda Team	Honda	23	+8.162	2	20
3	1	(Spain) Jorge Lorenzo	Yamaha Factory Racing	Yamaha	23	+14.209	4	16
4	58	(Italy) Marco Simoncelli	San Carlo Honda Gresini	Honda	23	+20.646	6	13
5	11	(United States) Ben Spies	Yamaha Factory Racing	Yamaha	23	+27.739	3	11
6	19	(Spain) Álvaro Bautista	Rizla Suzuki MotoGP	Suzuki	23	+30.373	11	10
7	69	(United States) Nicky Hayden	Ducati Team	Ducati	23	+34.288	7	9
8	8	(Spain) Héctor Barberá	Mapfre Aspar Team MotoGP	Ducati	23	+37.305	13	8
9	35	(United Kingdom) Cal Crutchlow	Monster Yamaha Tech 3	Yamaha	23	+39.652	12	7
10	46	(Italy) Valentino Rossi	Ducati Team	Ducati	23	+39.832	17 (Note: Following his engine change, Rossi started the race from pit lane ten seconds after the race start because of the engine change limit rule which restricts each rider to six engines per season.)	6
11	7	(Japan) Hiroshi Aoyama	San Carlo Honda Gresini	Honda	23	+39.997	9	5
12	14	(France) Randy de Puniet	Pramac Racing Team	Ducati	23	+54.717	10	4
13	5	(United States) Colin Edwards	Monster Yamaha Tech 3	Yamaha	23	+58.430	14	3
Ret	24	(Spain) Toni Elías	LCR Honda MotoGP	Honda	15	Collision	16	
Ret	65	(Italy) Loris Capirossi	Pramac Racing Team	Ducati	15	Collision	15	
Ret	4	(Italy) Andrea Dovizioso	Repsol Honda Team	Honda	0	Accident	5	
Ret	17	(Czech Republic) Karel Abraham	Cardion AB Motoracing	Ducati	0	Accident	8	

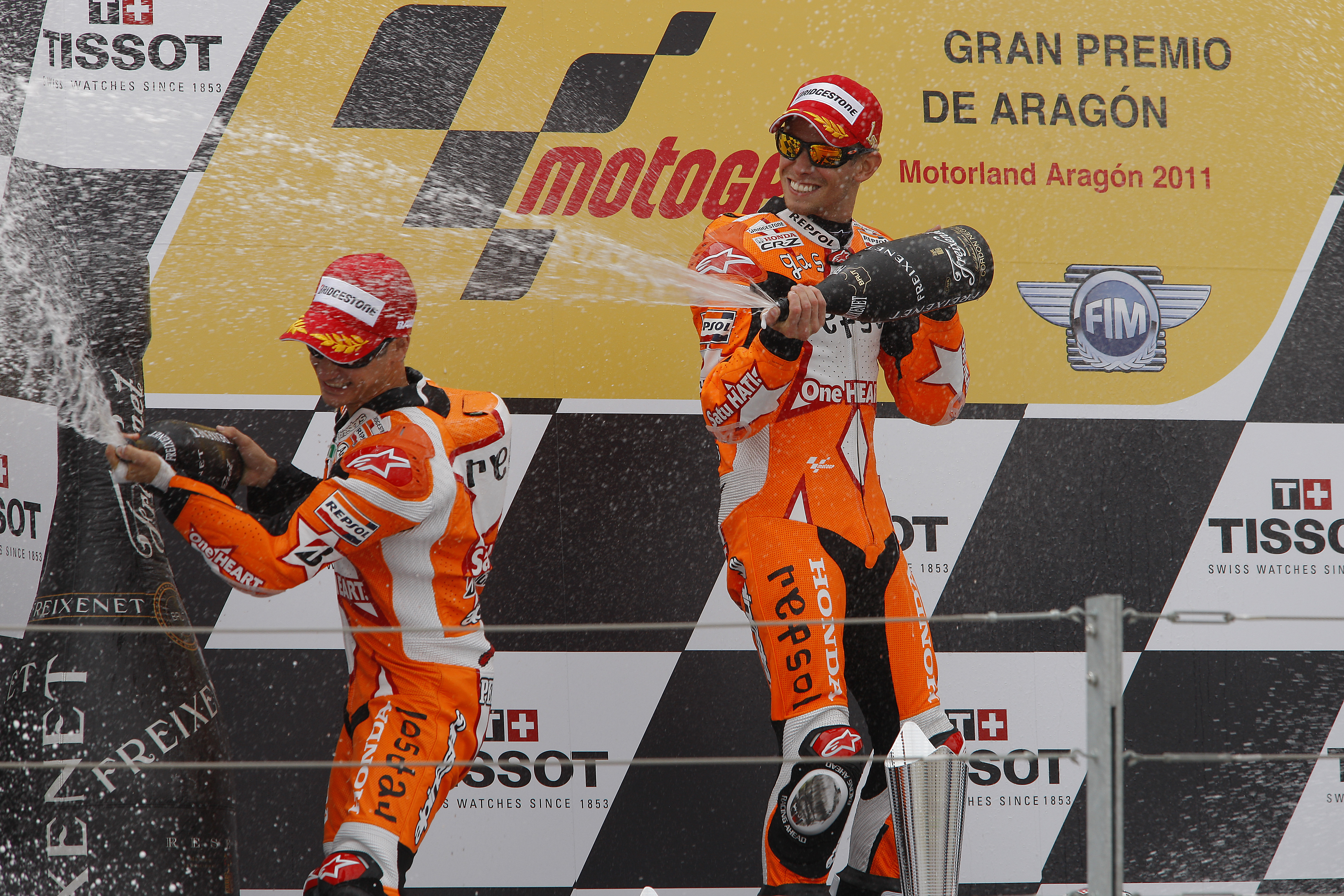
Casey Stoner and Dani Pedrosa, spraying the champagne on the podium after finishing first and second at the MotoGP race.

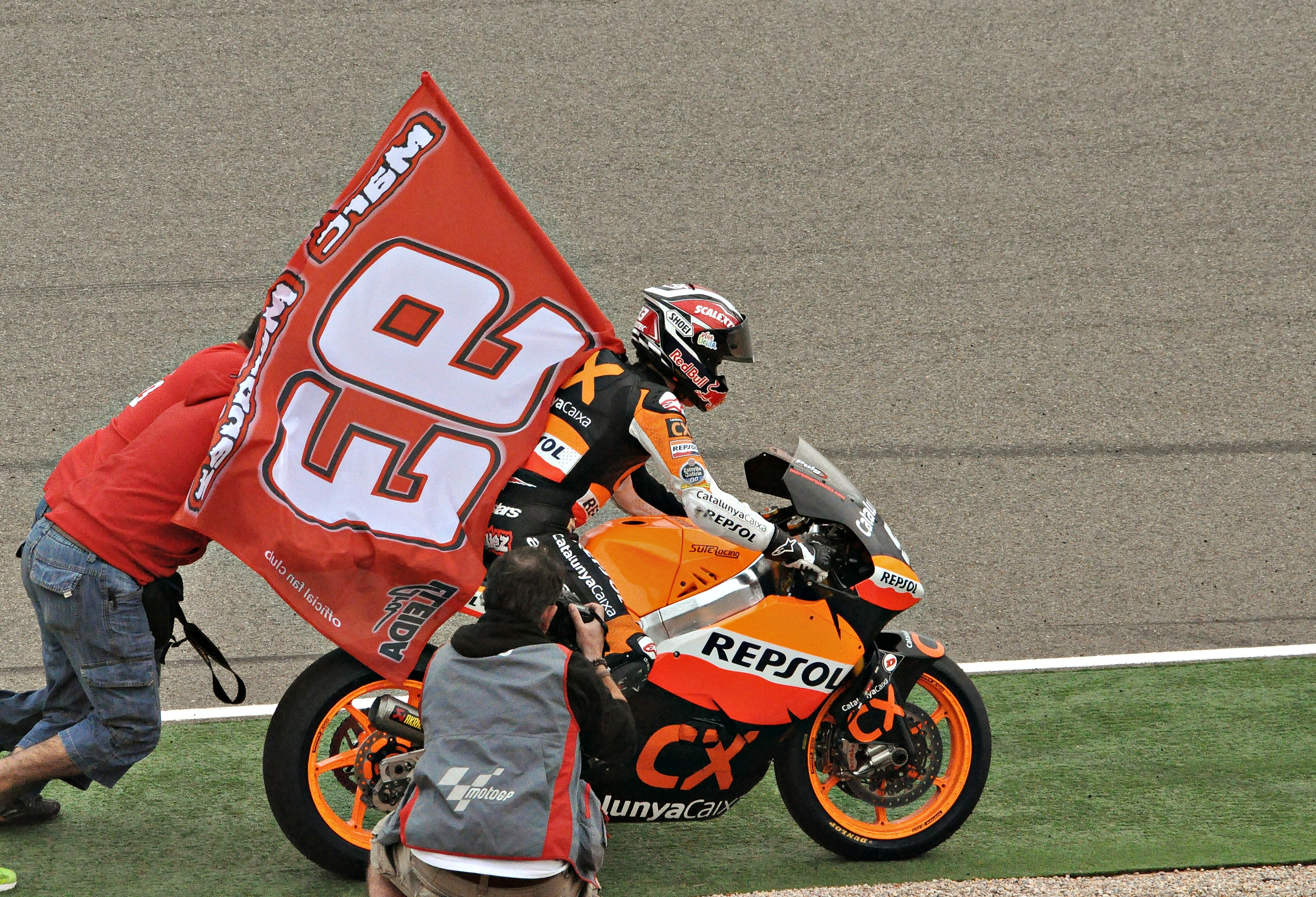
Marc Márquez, celebrating after winning the Moto2 race.

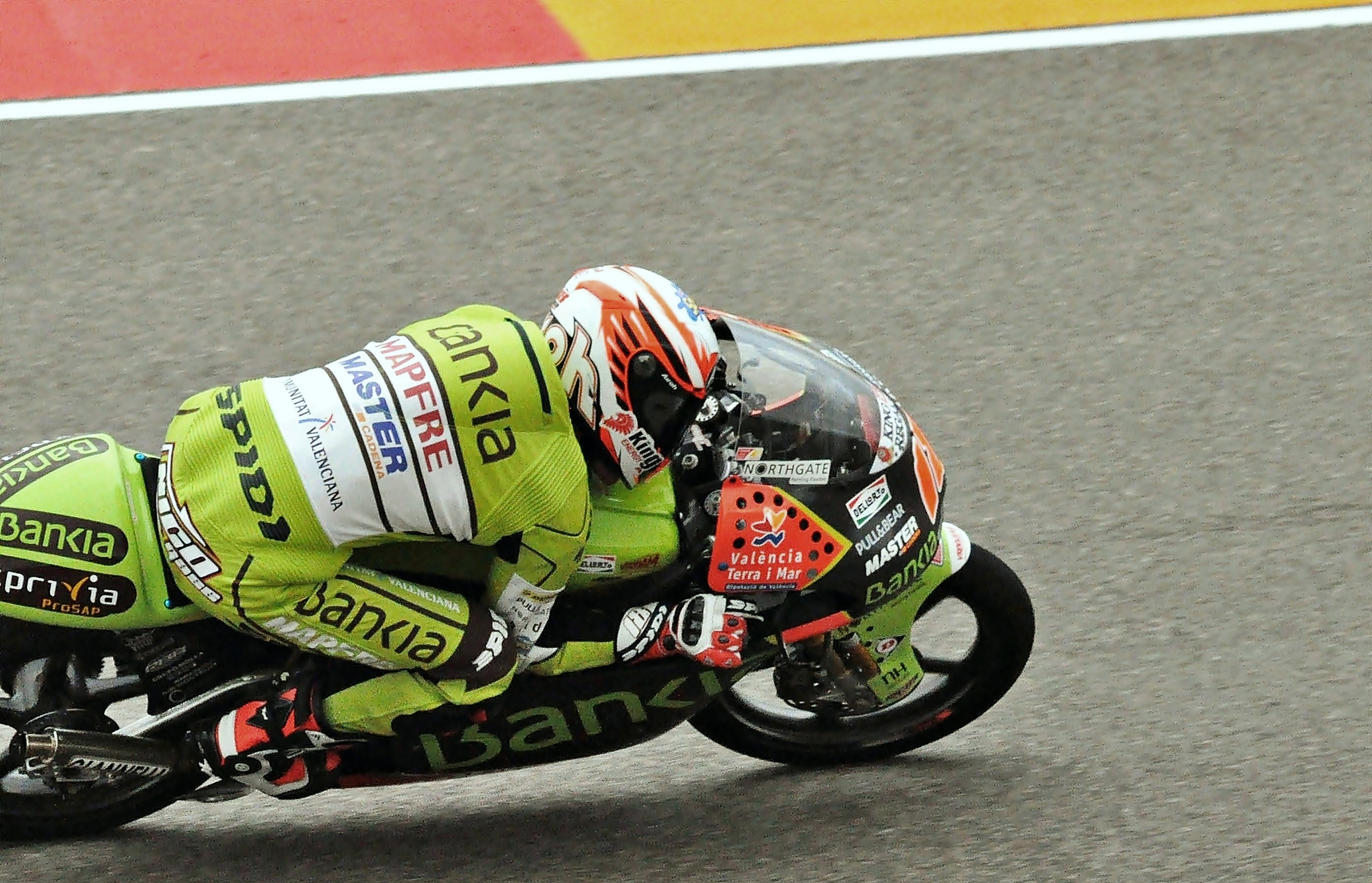
Nicolás Terol, riding his bike. He would go on to win the 125cc race.

== Moto2 classification ==
Pos.	No.	Rider	Manufacturer	Laps	Time/Retired	Grid	Points
1	93	(Spain) Marc Márquez	Suter	21	40:20.575	1	25
2	29	(Italy) Andrea Iannone	Suter	21	+2.466	10	20
3	3	(Italy) Simone Corsi	FTR	21	+2.574	12	16
4	15	(San Marino) Alex de Angelis	Motobi	21	+3.054	5	13
5	40	(Spain) Aleix Espargaró	Pons Kalex	21	+10.831	6	11
6	38	(United Kingdom) Bradley Smith	Tech 3	21	+10.870	15	10
7	12	(Switzerland) Thomas Lüthi	Suter	21	+11.005	11	9
8	65	(Germany) Stefan Bradl	Kalex	21	+11.212	4	8
9	77	(Switzerland) Dominique Aegerter	Suter	21	+11.810	23	7
10	36	(Finland) Mika Kallio	Suter	21	+11.939	9	6
11	13	(Australia) Anthony West	MZ-RE Honda	21	+12.108	21	5
12	63	(France) Mike Di Meglio	Tech 3	21	+12.114	19	4
13	76	(Germany) Max Neukirchner	MZ-RE Honda	21	+12.180	17	3
14	44	(Spain) Pol Espargaró	FTR	21	+12.908	8	2
15	45	(United Kingdom) Scott Redding	Suter	21	+13.329	3	1
16	34	(Spain) Esteve Rabat	FTR	21	+13.875	20	
17	60	(Spain) Julián Simón	Suter	21	+13.954	2	
18	19	(Belgium) Xavier Siméon	Tech 3	21	+15.251	24	
19	71	(Italy) Claudio Corti	Suter	21	+18.470	16	
20	18	(Spain) Jordi Torres	Suter	21	+20.128	22	
21	4	(Switzerland) Randy Krummenacher	Kalex	21	+38.974	25	
22	25	(Italy) Alex Baldolini	Pons Kalex	21	+39.072	27	
23	9	(United States) Kenny Noyes	FTR	21	+39.340	33	
24	7	(Japan) Tomoyoshi Koyama	Suter	21	+48.695	29	
25	88	(Spain) Ricard Cardús	Moriwaki	21	+48.843	26	
26	64	(Colombia) Santiago Hernández	FTR	21	+1:02.670	31	
27	33	(Spain) Sergio Gadea	Moriwaki	21	+1:05.633	35	
28	6	(Spain) Joan Olivé	FTR	21	+1:06.619	34	
29	53	(France) Valentin Debise	FTR	21	+1:11.832	32	
30	39	(Venezuela) Robertino Pietri	Suter	21	+1:27.512	36	
31	72	(Japan) Yuki Takahashi	Moriwaki	21	+1:31.402	14	
32	95	(Qatar) Mashel Al Naimi	Moriwaki	21	+1:33.725	37	
33	82	(Spain) Elena Rosell	Suter	21	+1:36.548	38	
Ret	51	(Italy) Michele Pirro	Moriwaki	17	Retirement	13	
Ret	16	(France) Jules Cluzel	Suter	9	Accident	7	
Ret	14	(Thailand) Ratthapark Wilairot	FTR	9	Accident	30	
Ret	35	(Italy) Raffaele De Rosa	Suter	9	Retirement	28	
Ret	75	(Italy) Mattia Pasini	FTR	3	Retirement	18	
DNS	68	(Colombia) Yonny Hernández	FTR		Did not start		
OFFICIAL MOTO2 REPORT

== 125cc classification ==
Pos.	No.	Rider	Manufacturer	Laps	Time/Retired	Grid	Points
1	18	(Spain) Nicolás Terol	Aprilia	20	40:26.726	3	25
2	5	(France) Johann Zarco	Derbi	20	+6.771	4	20
3	25	(Spain) Maverick Viñales	Aprilia	20	+18.929	2	16
4	7	(Spain) Efrén Vázquez	Derbi	20	+27.472	9	13
5	39	(Spain) Luis Salom	Aprilia	20	+27.469 (Note: Salom and Cortese, who finished in fourth and sixth position, lost one position for overtaking under yellow flags.)	6	11
6	52	(United Kingdom) Danny Kent	Aprilia	20	+27.750	5	10
7	11	(Germany) Sandro Cortese	Aprilia	20	+27.740	7	9
8	23	(Spain) Alberto Moncayo	Aprilia	20	+27.778	8	8
9	26	(Spain) Adrián Martín	Aprilia	20	+43.009	11	7
10	94	(Germany) Jonas Folger	Aprilia	20	+49.090	10	6
11	77	(Germany) Marcel Schrötter	Mahindra	20	+53.876	15	5
12	3	(Italy) Luigi Morciano	Aprilia	20	+56.395	19	4
13	84	(Czech Republic) Jakub Kornfeil	Aprilia	20	+57.513	14	3
14	19	(Italy) Alessandro Tonucci	Aprilia	20	+1:07.215	22	2
15	99	(United Kingdom) Danny Webb	Mahindra	20	+1:14.906	23	1
16	50	(Norway) Sturla Fagerhaug	Aprilia	20	+1:31.266	26	
17	60	(Italy) Manuel Tatasciore	Aprilia	20	+1:36.871	27	
18	30	(Switzerland) Giulian Pedone	Aprilia	20	+1:40.668	24	
19	90	(Switzerland) Damien Raemy	KTM	20	+1:58.898	33	
20	37	(Spain) Pedro Rodríguez	Aprilia	19	+1 lap	32	
Ret	55	(Spain) Héctor Faubel	Aprilia	19	Accident	1	
Ret	63	(Malaysia) Zulfahmi Khairuddin	Derbi	18	Retirement	31	
Ret	21	(United Kingdom) Harry Stafford	Aprilia	16	Retirement	21	
Ret	28	(Spain) Josep Rodríguez	Aprilia	11	Retirement	12	
Ret	44	(Portugal) Miguel Oliveira	Aprilia	7	Retirement	16	
Ret	31	(Finland) Niklas Ajo	Aprilia	7	Accident	18	
Ret	43	(Italy) Francesco Mauriello	Aprilia	7	Accident	25	
Ret	17	(United Kingdom) Taylor Mackenzie	Aprilia	6	Accident	28	
Ret	96	(France) Louis Rossi	Aprilia	5	Accident	13	
Ret	86	(Germany) Kevin Hanus	Honda	5	Retirement	30	
Ret	10	(France) Alexis Masbou	KTM	4	Retirement	20	
Ret	53	(Netherlands) Jasper Iwema	Aprilia	1	Accident	17	
Ret	36	(Spain) Joan Perelló	Aprilia	0	Retirement	29	
OFFICIAL 125cc REPORT

== Championship standings after the race (MotoGP) ==
Below are the standings for the top five riders and constructors after round fourteen has concluded.

Riders' Championship standings

Pos.	Rider	Points
1	(Australia) Casey Stoner	284
2	(Spain) Jorge Lorenzo	240
3	(Italy) Andrea Dovizioso	185
4	(Spain) Dani Pedrosa	170
5	(United States) Ben Spies	146

Constructors' Championship standings

Pos.	Constructor	Points
1	(Japan) Honda	330
2	(Japan) Yamaha	274
3	(Italy) Ducati	153
4	(Japan) Suzuki	73

- Note: Only the top five positions are included for both sets of standings.

Previous race: 2011 San Marino Grand Prix	FIM Grand Prix World Championship; 2011 season	Next race: 2011 Japanese Grand Prix
Previous race: 2010 Aragon Grand Prix	Aragon motorcycle Grand Prix	Next race: 2012 Aragon Grand Prix
