= 2011 Spanish motorcycle Grand Prix =

(Spain) 2011 Spanish Grand Prix
Race details
- Race 2 of 18 races in the 2011 Grand Prix motorcycle racing season
- Date: 3 April 2011
- Official name: Gran Premio bwin de España
- Location: Circuito de Jerez
- Course: Permanent racing facility; 4.423 km (2.748 mi)

MotoGP
Pole position
Rider	(Australia) Casey Stoner	Honda
Time	1:38.757	
Fastest lap
Rider	(Italy) Valentino Rossi	Ducati
Time	1:48.753	
Podium
First	(Spain) Jorge Lorenzo	Yamaha
Second	(Spain) Dani Pedrosa	Honda
Third	(United States) Nicky Hayden	Ducati

Moto2
Pole position
Rider	(Germany) Stefan Bradl	Kalex
Time	1:42.706	
Fastest lap
Rider	(Italy) Andrea Iannone	Suter
Time	1:53.893	
Podium
First	(Italy) Andrea Iannone	Suter
Second	(Switzerland) Thomas Lüthi	Suter
Third	(Italy) Simone Corsi	FTR

125cc
Pole position
Rider	(Germany) Sandro Cortese	Aprilia
Time	1:47.399	
Fastest lap
Rider	(Spain) Héctor Faubel	Aprilia
Time	1:55.605	
Podium
First	(Spain) Nicolás Terol	Aprilia
Second	(Germany) Jonas Folger	Aprilia
Third	(France) Johann Zarco	Derbi

The 2011 Spanish motorcycle Grand Prix was the second round of the 2011 Grand Prix motorcycle racing season. It took place on the weekend of 1–3 April 2011 at the Circuito de Jerez located in Jerez de la Frontera, Spain. This was Nicky Hayden's final MotoGP podium finish before he switched to World Superbikes in 2016 and his death in 2017.

== MotoGP classification ==
Pos.	No	Rider	Team	Manufacturer	Laps	Time/Retired	Grid	Points
1	1	(Spain) Jorge Lorenzo	Yamaha Factory Racing	Yamaha	27	50:49.046	3	25
2	26	(Spain) Dani Pedrosa	Repsol Honda Team	Honda	27	+19.339	2	20
3	69	(United States) Nicky Hayden	Ducati Team	Ducati	27	+29.085	11	16
4	7	(Japan) Hiroshi Aoyama	San Carlo Honda Gresini	Honda	27	+29.551	10	13
5	46	(Italy) Valentino Rossi	Ducati Team	Ducati	27	+1:02.227	12	11
6	8	(Spain) Héctor Barberá	Mapfre Aspar Team MotoGP	Ducati	27	+1:08.440	13	10
7	17	(Czech Republic) Karel Abraham	Cardion AB Motoracing	Ducati	27	+1:14.120	16	9
8	35	(United Kingdom) Cal Crutchlow	Monster Yamaha Tech 3	Yamaha	27	+1:19.110	9	8
9	24	(Spain) Toni Elías	LCR Honda MotoGP	Honda	27	+1:42.906	17	7
10	21	(United States) John Hopkins	Rizla Suzuki MotoGP	Suzuki	27	+1:48.395	14	6
11	65	(Italy) Loris Capirossi	Pramac Racing Team	Ducati	27	+1:51.876	15	5
12	4	(Italy) Andrea Dovizioso	Repsol Honda Team	Honda	26	+1 lap	6	4
Ret	5	(United States) Colin Edwards	Monster Yamaha Tech 3	Yamaha	26	Accident	8	
Ret	11	(United States) Ben Spies	Yamaha Factory Racing	Yamaha	24	Accident	4	
Ret	14	(France) Randy de Puniet	Pramac Racing Team	Ducati	16	Retirement	7	
Ret	58	(Italy) Marco Simoncelli	San Carlo Honda Gresini	Honda	11	Accident	5	
Ret	27	(Australia) Casey Stoner	Repsol Honda Team	Honda	7	Collision	1	

== Moto2 classification ==
Pos.	No.	Rider	Manufacturer	Laps	Time/Retired	Grid	Points
1	29	(Italy) Andrea Iannone	Suter	26	49:56.423	11	25
2	12	(Switzerland) Thomas Lüthi	Suter	26	+7.850	3	20
3	3	(Italy) Simone Corsi	FTR	26	+12.625	18	16
4	38	(United Kingdom) Bradley Smith	Tech 3	26	+15.355	5	13
5	65	(Germany) Stefan Bradl	Kalex	26	+17.850	1	11
6	60	(Spain) Julián Simón	Suter	26	+24.247	10	10
7	15	(San Marino) Alex de Angelis	Motobi	26	+27.991	6	9
8	49	(United Kingdom) Kev Coghlan	FTR	26	+36.181	24	8
9	51	(Italy) Michele Pirro	Moriwaki	26	+36.775	7	7
10	76	(Germany) Max Neukirchner	MZ-RE Honda	26	+41.407	36	6
11	13	(Australia) Anthony West	MZ-RE Honda	26	+41.711	30	5
12	14	(Thailand) Ratthapark Wilairot	FTR	26	+41.870	31	4
13	75	(Italy) Mattia Pasini	FTR	26	+42.313	34	3
14	68	(Colombia) Yonny Hernández	FTR	26	+45.384	22	2
15	34	(Spain) Esteve Rabat	FTR	26	+47.193	21	1
16	54	(Turkey) Kenan Sofuoğlu	Suter	26	+47.204	12	
17	36	(Finland) Mika Kallio	Suter	26	+47.316	14	
18	21	(Spain) Javier Forés	Suter	26	+50.677	26	
19	19	(Belgium) Xavier Siméon	Tech 3	26	+57.958	32	
20	44	(Spain) Pol Espargaró	FTR	26	+58.554	27	
21	71	(Italy) Claudio Corti	Suter	26	+1:07.467	9	
22	88	(Spain) Ricard Cardús	Moriwaki	26	+1:10.925	19	
23	45	(United Kingdom) Scott Redding	Suter	26	+1:16.149	13	
24	40	(Spain) Aleix Espargaró	Pons Kalex	26	+1:19.512	8	
25	35	(Italy) Raffaele De Rosa	Moriwaki	26	+1:22.459	33	
26	63	(France) Mike Di Meglio	Tech 3	26	+1:26.753	29	
27	4	(Switzerland) Randy Krummenacher	Kalex	26	+1:37.226	28	
28	77	(Switzerland) Dominique Aegerter	Suter	26	+1:42.838	15	
29	9	(United States) Kenny Noyes	FTR	26	+1:54.532	25	
30	53	(France) Valentin Debise	FTR	26	+1:57.120	17	
31	64	(Colombia) Santiago Hernández	FTR	25	+1 lap	37	
32	97	(South Africa) Steven Odendaal	Suter	25	+1 lap	38	
33	95	(Qatar) Mashel Al Naimi	Moriwaki	23	+3 laps	39	
Ret	25	(Italy) Alex Baldolini	Suter	12	Retirement	23	
Ret	93	(Spain) Marc Márquez	Suter	10	Collision	4	
Ret	16	(France) Jules Cluzel	Suter	10	Collision	16	
Ret	72	(Japan) Yuki Takahashi	Moriwaki	9	Accident	2	
Ret	39	(Venezuela) Robertino Pietri	Suter	4	Accident	35	
Ret	99	(Poland) Łukasz Wargala	Moriwaki	1	Accident	40	
Ret	80	(Spain) Axel Pons	Pons Kalex	0	Retirement	20	
OFFICIAL MOTO2 REPORT

== 125 cc classification ==
Pos.	No.	Rider	Manufacturer	Laps	Time/Retired	Grid	Points
1	18	(Spain) Nicolás Terol	Aprilia	23	44:50.646	2	25
2	94	(Germany) Jonas Folger	Aprilia	23	+17.446	7	20
3	5	(France) Johann Zarco	Derbi	23	+23.955	5	16
4	52	(United Kingdom) Danny Kent	Aprilia	23	+32.883	9	13
5	17	(United Kingdom) Taylor Mackenzie	Aprilia	23	+34.713	16	11
6	11	(Germany) Sandro Cortese	Aprilia	23	+51.515	1	10
7	84	(Czech Republic) Jakub Kornfeil	Aprilia	23	+54.920	17	9
8	76	(Japan) Hiroki Ono	KTM	23	+1:00.164	21	8
9	7	(Spain) Efrén Vázquez	Derbi	23	+1:00.286	4	7
10	63	(Malaysia) Zulfahmi Khairuddin	Derbi	23	+1:00.399	18	6
11	55	(Spain) Héctor Faubel	Aprilia	23	+1:00.760	3	5
12	26	(Spain) Adrián Martín	Aprilia	23	+1:07.739	14	4
13	77	(Germany) Marcel Schrötter	Mahindra	23	+1:19.710	23	3
14	96	(France) Louis Rossi	Aprilia	23	+1:21.812	13	2
15	28	(Spain) Josep Rodríguez	Aprilia	23	+1:23.118	20	1
16	23	(Spain) Alberto Moncayo	Aprilia	23	+1:24.040	10	
17	15	(Italy) Simone Grotzkyj	Aprilia	23	+1:30.610	22	
18	21	(United Kingdom) Harry Stafford	Aprilia	23	+1:30.952	27	
19	19	(Italy) Alessandro Tonucci	Aprilia	23	+1:55.354	26	
20	3	(Italy) Luigi Morciano	Aprilia	22	+1 lap	25	
21	34	(Spain) Daniel Ruiz	Honda	22	+1 lap	31	
22	12	(Germany) Daniel Kartheininger	KTM	22	+1 lap	29	
23	36	(Spain) Joan Perelló	Aprilia	22	+1 lap	30	
24	86	(Germany) Kevin Hanus	Honda	21	+2 laps	32	
Ret	25	(Spain) Maverick Viñales	Aprilia	15	Retirement	12	
Ret	33	(Spain) Sergio Gadea	Aprilia	15	Accident	11	
Ret	53	(Netherlands) Jasper Iwema	Aprilia	15	Retirement	15	
Ret	43	(Italy) Francesco Mauriello	Aprilia	13	Accident	33	
Ret	99	(United Kingdom) Danny Webb	Mahindra	10	Accident	19	
Ret	39	(Spain) Luis Salom	Aprilia	9	Accident	6	
Ret	30	(Switzerland) Giulian Pedone	Aprilia	8	Retirement	28	
Ret	44	(Portugal) Miguel Oliveira	Aprilia	5	Accident	8	
Ret	31	(Finland) Niklas Ajo	Aprilia	2	Accident	24	
DNQ	69	(India) Sarath Kumar	Aprilia		Did not qualify		
OFFICIAL 125cc REPORT

== Championship standings after the race (MotoGP) ==
Below are the standings for the top five riders and constructors after round two has concluded.

Riders' Championship standings

Pos.	Rider	Points
1	(Spain) Jorge Lorenzo	45
2	(Spain) Dani Pedrosa	36
3	(Australia) Casey Stoner	25
4	(United States) Nicky Hayden	23
5	(Italy) Andrea Dovizioso	20

Constructors' Championship standings

Pos.	Constructor	Points
1	(Japan) Yamaha	45
2	(Japan) Honda	45
3	(Italy) Ducati	25
4	(Japan) Suzuki	6

- Note: Only the top five positions are included for both sets of standings.

Previous race: 2011 Qatar Grand Prix	FIM Grand Prix World Championship; 2011 season	Next race: 2011 Portuguese Grand Prix
Previous race: 2010 Spanish Grand Prix	Spanish motorcycle Grand Prix	Next race: 2012 Spanish Grand Prix
