= 2011 Czech Republic motorcycle Grand Prix =

11th round of the 2011 Grand Prix motorcycle racing season

2011 Czech Republic Grand Prix
Race details
- Race 11 of 18 races in the 2011 Grand Prix motorcycle racing season
- Date: 14 August 2011
- Official name: Cardion ab Grand Prix České republiky
- Location: Brno Circuit
- Course: Permanent racing facility; 5.403 km (3.357 mi)

MotoGP
Pole position
- Rider: (Spain) Dani Pedrosa
- Time: 1:56.591
Fastest lap
- Rider: (Australia) Casey Stoner
- Time: 1:57.191
Podium
- First: (Australia) Casey Stoner
- Second: (Italy) Andrea Dovizioso
- Third: (Italy) Marco Simoncelli

Moto2
Pole position
- Rider: (Spain) Marc Márquez
- Time: 2:02.493
Fastest lap
- Rider: (Italy) Andrea Iannone
- Time: 2:02.640
Podium
- First: (Italy) Andrea Iannone
- Second: (Spain) Marc Márquez
- Third: (Germany) Stefan Bradl

125cc
Pole position
- Rider: (Spain) Nicolás Terol
- Time: 2:08.118
Fastest lap
- Rider: (Germany) Sandro Cortese
- Time: 2:08.365
Podium
- First: (Germany) Sandro Cortese
- Second: (France) Johann Zarco
- Third: (Spain) Alberto Moncayo

The 2011 Czech Republic motorcycle Grand Prix was the eleventh round of the 2011 Grand Prix motorcycle racing season. It took place on the weekend of 12–14 August 2011 at the Brno Circuit located in Brno.

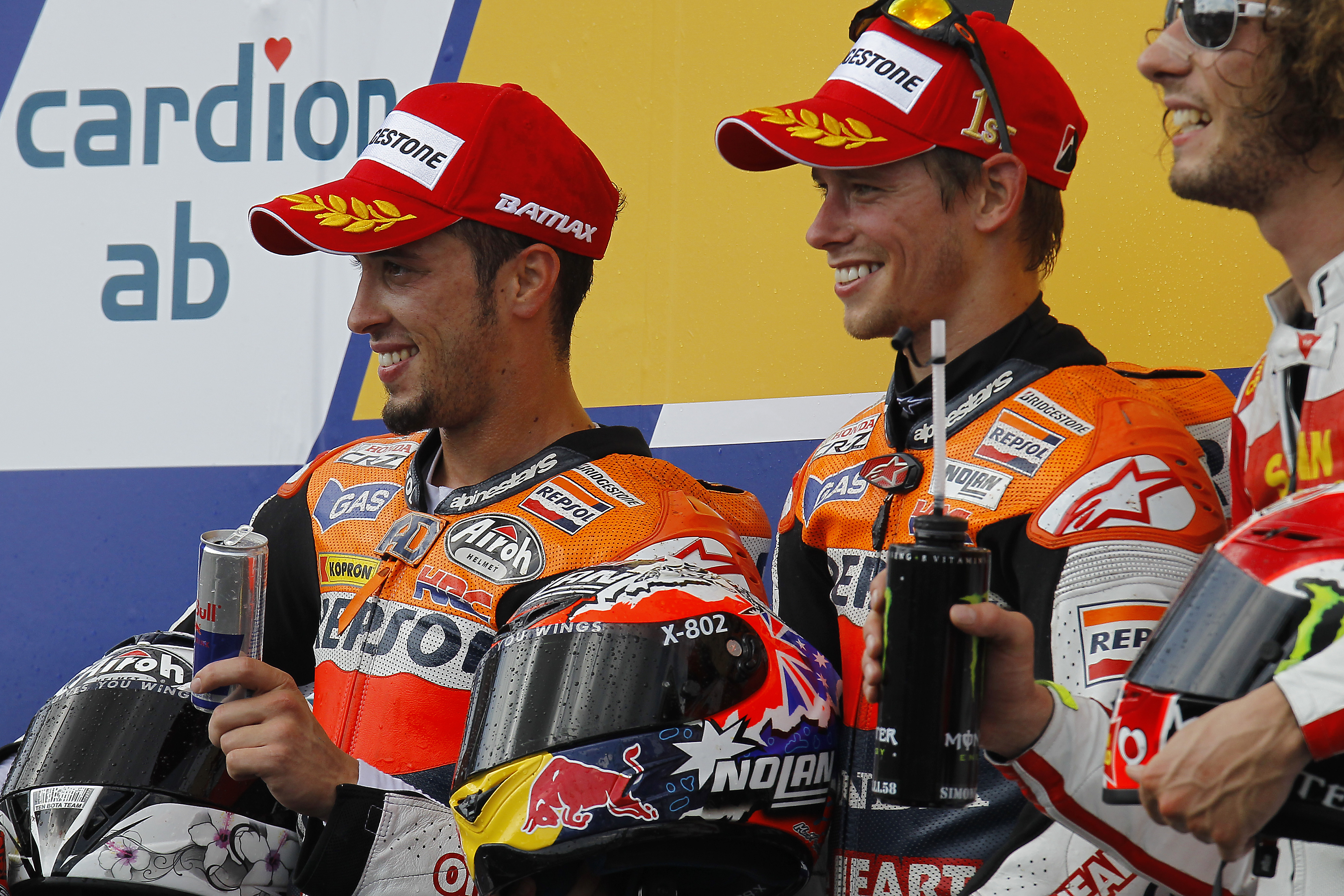
Andrea Dovizioso, Casey Stoner and Marco Simoncelli, celebrating on the podium after finishing second, first and third at the MotoGP race.

== MotoGP classification ==
Pos.	No.	Rider	Team	Manufacturer	Laps	Time/Retired	Grid	Points
1	27	(Australia) Casey Stoner	Repsol Honda Team	Honda	22	43:16.796	3	25
2	4	(Italy) Andrea Dovizioso	Repsol Honda Team	Honda	22	+6.532	7	20
3	58	(Italy) Marco Simoncelli	San Carlo Honda Gresini	Honda	22	+7.792	5	16
4	1	(Spain) Jorge Lorenzo	Yamaha Factory Racing	Yamaha	22	+8.513	2	13
5	11	(United States) Ben Spies	Yamaha Factory Racing	Yamaha	22	+10.186	4	11
6	46	(Italy) Valentino Rossi	Ducati Team	Ducati	22	+12.632	6	10
7	69	(United States) Nicky Hayden	Ducati Team	Ducati	22	+23.037	9	9
8	5	(United States) Colin Edwards	Monster Yamaha Tech 3	Yamaha	22	+24.189	8	8
9	7	(Japan) Hiroshi Aoyama	San Carlo Honda Gresini	Honda	22	+25.202	10	7
10	8	(Spain) Héctor Barberá	Mapfre Aspar Team MotoGP	Ducati	22	+36.566	13	6
11	24	(Spain) Toni Elías	LCR Honda MotoGP	Honda	22	+36.679	12	5
12	14	(France) Randy de Puniet	Pramac Racing Team	Ducati	22	+37.109	15	4
13	65	(Italy) Loris Capirossi	Pramac Racing Team	Ducati	22	+48.911	16	3
Ret	19	(Spain) Álvaro Bautista	Rizla Suzuki MotoGP	Suzuki	16	Retirement	14	
Ret	17	(Czech Republic) Karel Abraham	Cardion AB Motoracing	Ducati	12	Retirement	17	
Ret	35	(United Kingdom) Cal Crutchlow	Monster Yamaha Tech 3	Yamaha	6	Accident	11	
Ret	26	(Spain) Dani Pedrosa	Repsol Honda Team	Honda	2	Accident	1	
DNS	21	(United States) John Hopkins	Rizla Suzuki MotoGP	Suzuki		Injury		

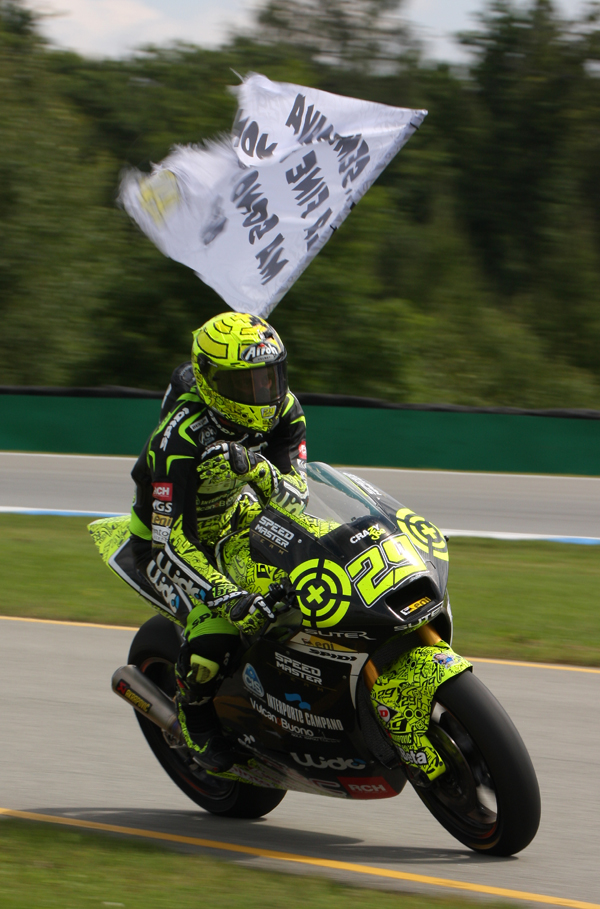
Andrea Iannone, celebrating with a flag after winning the Moto2 race.

== Moto2 classification ==
Pos.	No.	Rider	Manufacturer	Laps	Time/Retired	Grid	Points
1	29	(Italy) Andrea Iannone	Suter	20	41:13.255	5	25
2	93	(Spain) Marc Márquez	Suter	20	+0.161	1	20
3	65	(Germany) Stefan Bradl	Kalex	20	+0.407	2	16
4	15	(San Marino) Alex de Angelis	Motobi	20	+0.870	3	13
5	12	(Switzerland) Thomas Lüthi	Suter	20	+4.225	4	11
6	40	(Spain) Aleix Espargaró	Pons Kalex	20	+13.636	6	10
7	34	(Spain) Esteve Rabat	FTR	20	+13.647	18	9
8	77	(Switzerland) Dominique Aegerter	Suter	20	+14.365	12	8
9	3	(Italy) Simone Corsi	FTR	20	+14.617	7	7
10	54	(Turkey) Kenan Sofuoğlu	Suter	20	+21.383	13	6
11	75	(Italy) Mattia Pasini	FTR	20	+26.235	8	5
12	72	(Japan) Yuki Takahashi	Moriwaki	20	+29.726	17	4
13	36	(Finland) Mika Kallio	Suter	20	+30.046	30	3
14	71	(Italy) Claudio Corti	Suter	20	+30.380	9	2
15	63	(France) Mike Di Meglio	Tech 3	20	+30.459	24	1
16	44	(Spain) Pol Espargaró	FTR	20	+31.691	14	
17	14	(Thailand) Ratthapark Wilairot	FTR	20	+31.752	21	
18	51	(Italy) Michele Pirro	Moriwaki	20	+35.548	22	
19	18	(Spain) Jordi Torres	Suter	20	+40.270	23	
20	9	(United States) Kenny Noyes	FTR	20	+40.722	32	
21	53	(France) Valentin Debise	FTR	20	+40.803	19	
22	88	(Spain) Ricard Cardús	Moriwaki	20	+42.247	26	
23	19	(Belgium) Xavier Siméon	Tech 3	20	+42.285	33	
24	80	(Spain) Axel Pons	Pons Kalex	20	+42.348	27	
25	39	(Venezuela) Robertino Pietri	Suter	20	+53.036	25	
26	45	(United Kingdom) Scott Redding	Suter	20	+53.044	20	
27	64	(Colombia) Santiago Hernández	FTR	20	+1:06.674	36	
28	97	(South Africa) Steven Odendaal	Suter	20	+1:07.935	35	
29	13	(Australia) Anthony West	MZ-RE Honda	20	+1:30.360	34	
30	95	(Qatar) Mashel Al Naimi	Moriwaki	20	+1:30.499	37	
Ret	24	(Italy) Tommaso Lorenzetti	FTR	19	Accident	38	
Ret	25	(Italy) Alex Baldolini	Suter	11	Retirement	31	
Ret	16	(France) Jules Cluzel	Suter	11	Retirement	11	
Ret	76	(Germany) Max Neukirchner	MZ-RE Honda	7	Retirement	15	
Ret	31	(Spain) Carmelo Morales	Suter	3	Accident	28	
Ret	38	(United Kingdom) Bradley Smith	Tech 3	1	Accident	16	
Ret	68	(Colombia) Yonny Hernández	FTR	1	Accident	29	
Ret	4	(Switzerland) Randy Krummenacher	Kalex	0	Accident	10	
DNS	60	(Spain) Julián Simón	Suter		Did not start		
OFFICIAL MOTO2 REPORT

== 125 cc classification ==
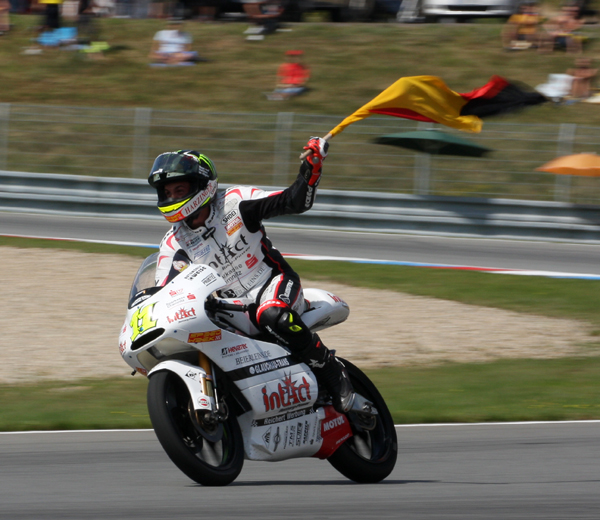
Sandro Cortese, celebrating with the German flag after winning the 125cc race.

Pos.	No.	Rider	Manufacturer	Laps	Time/Retired	Grid	Points
1	11	(Germany) Sandro Cortese	Aprilia	19	40:59.229	3	25
2	5	(France) Johann Zarco	Derbi	19	+0.397	2	20
3	23	(Spain) Alberto Moncayo	Aprilia	19	+10.773	7	16
4	55	(Spain) Héctor Faubel	Aprilia	19	+10.794	4	13
5	33	(Spain) Sergio Gadea	Aprilia	19	+11.144	10	11
6	25	(Spain) Maverick Viñales	Aprilia	19	+11.473	8	10
7	84	(Czech Republic) Jakub Kornfeil	Aprilia	19	+24.720	19	9
8	15	(Italy) Simone Grotzkyj	Aprilia	19	+39.982	9	8
9	63	(Malaysia) Zulfahmi Khairuddin	Derbi	19	+42.887	14	7
10	53	(Netherlands) Jasper Iwema	Aprilia	19	+43.023	15	6
11	3	(Italy) Luigi Morciano	Aprilia	19	+43.183	17	5
12	99	(United Kingdom) Danny Webb	Mahindra	19	+43.675	21	4
13	21	(United Kingdom) Harry Stafford	Aprilia	19	+43.764	30	3
14	77	(Germany) Marcel Schrötter	Mahindra	19	+44.076	22	2
15	96	(France) Louis Rossi	Aprilia	19	+50.240	18	1
16	50	(Norway) Sturla Fagerhaug	Aprilia	19	+50.297	20	
17	95	(Czech Republic) Miroslav Popov	Aprilia	19	+1:06.807	26	
18	41	(Germany) Luca Grünwald	KTM	19	+1:06.870	25	
19	19	(Italy) Alessandro Tonucci	Aprilia	19	+1:07.004	24	
20	43	(Italy) Francesco Mauriello	Aprilia	19	+1:07.132	23	
21	17	(United Kingdom) Taylor Mackenzie	Aprilia	19	+1:15.543	29	
22	36	(Spain) Joan Perelló	Aprilia	19	+1:19.523	27	
23	44	(Portugal) Miguel Oliveira	Aprilia	19	+1:19.885	16	
24	30	(Switzerland) Giulian Pedone	Aprilia	19	+1:33.814	28	
25	24	(Czech Republic) Ladislav Chmelík	Aprilia	19	+1:45.564	32	
26	56	(Hungary) Péter Sebestyén	KTM	19	+2:03.770	33	
Ret	60	(Italy) Manuel Tatasciore	Aprilia	16	Retirement	31	
Ret	7	(Spain) Efrén Vázquez	Derbi	13	Accident	5	
Ret	18	(Spain) Nicolás Terol	Aprilia	8	Retirement	1	
Ret	10	(France) Alexis Masbou	KTM	2	Retirement	11	
Ret	52	(United Kingdom) Danny Kent	Aprilia	1	Accident	6	
Ret	26	(Spain) Adrián Martín	Aprilia	1	Accident	12	
Ret	31	(Finland) Niklas Ajo	Aprilia	0	Accident	13	
DNS	39	(Spain) Luis Salom	Aprilia		Did not start		
DNQ	83	(Slovakia) Jakub Jantulík	Honda		Did not qualify		
OFFICIAL 125cc REPORT

== Championship standings after the race (MotoGP) ==
Below are the standings for the top five riders and constructors after round eleven has concluded.

Riders' Championship standings

Pos.	Rider	Points
1	(Australia) Casey Stoner	218
2	(Spain) Jorge Lorenzo	186
3	(Italy) Andrea Dovizioso	163
4	(Italy) Valentino Rossi	118
5	(Spain) Dani Pedrosa	110

Constructors' Championship standings

Pos.	Constructor	Points
1	(Japan) Honda	260
2	(Japan) Yamaha	217
3	(Italy) Ducati	127
4	(Japan) Suzuki	45

- Note: Only the top five positions are included for both sets of standings.

Previous race: 2011 United States Grand Prix	FIM Grand Prix World Championship; 2011 season	Next race: 2011 Indianapolis Grand Prix
Previous race: 2010 Czech Republic Grand Prix	Czech Republic motorcycle Grand Prix	Next race: 2012 Czech Republic Grand Prix
