= 2011 Qatar motorcycle Grand Prix =

2011 Qatar Grand Prix
Race details
- Race 1 of 18 races in the 2011 Grand Prix motorcycle racing season
- Date: 20 March 2011
- Official name: Commercialbank Grand Prix of Qatar
- Location: Losail International Circuit
- Course: Permanent racing facility; 5.380 km (3.343 mi)

MotoGP
Pole position
Rider	(Australia) Casey Stoner	Honda
Time	1:54.137	
Fastest lap
Rider	(Australia) Casey Stoner	Honda
Time	1:55.366	
Podium
First	(Australia) Casey Stoner	Honda
Second	(Spain) Jorge Lorenzo	Yamaha
Third	(Spain) Dani Pedrosa	Honda

Moto2
Pole position
Rider	(Germany) Stefan Bradl	Kalex
Time	2:00.168	
Fastest lap
Rider	(San Marino) Alex de Angelis	Motobi
Time	2:01.003	
Podium
First	(Germany) Stefan Bradl	Kalex
Second	(Italy) Andrea Iannone	Suter
Third	(Switzerland) Thomas Lüthi	Suter

125cc
Pole position
Rider	(Spain) Nicolás Terol	Aprilia
Time	2:06.605	
Fastest lap
Rider	(Spain) Nicolás Terol	Aprilia
Time	2:06.463	
Podium
First	(Spain) Nicolás Terol	Aprilia
Second	(Germany) Sandro Cortese	Aprilia
Third	(Spain) Sergio Gadea	Aprilia

The 2011 Qatar motorcycle Grand Prix was the opening round of the 2011 MotoGP championship. It took place on the weekend of 17–20 March 2011 at the Losail International Circuit located in Doha, Qatar. In the MotoGP race Casey Stoner won finishing 3.44 seconds ahead of 2010 world champion Jorge Lorenzo with Dani Pedrosa in third place.

== MotoGP classification ==
Pos.	No.	Rider	Team	Manufacturer	Laps	Time/Retired	Grid	Points
1	27	(Australia) Casey Stoner	Repsol Honda Team	Honda	22	42:38.569	1	25
2	1	(Spain) Jorge Lorenzo	Yamaha Factory Racing	Yamaha	22	+3.440	3	20
3	26	(Spain) Dani Pedrosa	Repsol Honda Team	Honda	22	+5.051	2	16
4	4	(Italy) Andrea Dovizioso	Repsol Honda Team	Honda	22	+5.942	7	13
5	58	(Italy) Marco Simoncelli	San Carlo Honda Gresini	Honda	22	+7.358	4	11
6	11	(United States) Ben Spies	Yamaha Factory Racing	Yamaha	22	+10.468	5	10
7	46	(Italy) Valentino Rossi	Ducati Team	Ducati	22	+16.431	9	9
8	5	(United States) Colin Edwards	Monster Yamaha Tech 3	Yamaha	22	+26.293	10	8
9	69	(United States) Nicky Hayden	Ducati Team	Ducati	22	+27.416	13	7
10	7	(Japan) Hiroshi Aoyama	San Carlo Honda Gresini	Honda	22	+28.920	12	6
11	35	(United Kingdom) Cal Crutchlow	Monster Yamaha Tech 3	Yamaha	22	+34.539	8	5
12	8	(Spain) Héctor Barberá	Mapfre Aspar Team MotoGP	Ducati	22	+34.829	6	4
13	17	(Czech Republic) Karel Abraham	Cardion AB Motoracing	Ducati	22	+37.957	15	3
Ret	24	(Spain) Toni Elías	LCR Honda MotoGP	Honda	18	Accident	16	
Ret	65	(Italy) Loris Capirossi	Pramac Racing Team	Ducati	1	Retirement	14	
Ret	14	(France) Randy de Puniet	Pramac Racing Team	Ducati	0	Accident	11	
DNS	19	(Spain) Álvaro Bautista	Rizla Suzuki MotoGP	Suzuki		Injured		

== Moto2 classification ==
Pos.	No.	Rider	Bike	Laps	Time/Retired	Grid	Points
1	65	(Germany) Stefan Bradl	Kalex	20	40:38.549	1	25
2	29	(Italy) Andrea Iannone	Suter	20	+4.330	16	20
3	12	(Switzerland) Thomas Lüthi	Suter	20	+5.137	3	16
4	15	(San Marino) Alex de Angelis	Motobi	20	+5.925	8	13
5	72	(Japan) Yuki Takahashi	Moriwaki	20	+6.621	4	11
6	3	(Italy) Simone Corsi	FTR	20	+14.217	11	10
7	16	(France) Jules Cluzel	Suter	20	+14.257	5	9
8	51	(Italy) Michele Pirro	Moriwaki	20	+14.501	9	8
9	38	(United Kingdom) Bradley Smith	Tech 3	20	+18.910	7	7
10	60	(Spain) Julián Simón	Suter	20	+19.174	6	6
11	40	(Spain) Aleix Espargaró	Pons Kalex	20	+19.442	14	5
12	68	(Colombia) Yonny Hernández	FTR	20	+20.830	20	4
13	77	(Switzerland) Dominique Aegerter	Suter	20	+20.837	15	3
14	34	(Spain) Esteve Rabat	FTR	20	+20.855	17	2
15	76	(Germany) Max Neukirchner	MZ-RE Honda	20	+26.803	12	1
16	80	(Spain) Axel Pons	Pons Kalex	20	+27.295	23	
17	88	(Spain) Ricard Cardús	Moriwaki	20	+28.080	22	
18	54	(Turkey) Kenan Sofuoğlu	Suter	20	+28.212	28	
19	63	(France) Mike Di Meglio	Tech 3	20	+34.939	19	
20	36	(Finland) Mika Kallio	Suter	20	+34.962	25	
21	71	(Italy) Claudio Corti	Suter	20	+37.982	18	
22	44	(Spain) Pol Espargaró	FTR	20	+43.491	24	
23	53	(France) Valentin Debise	FTR	20	+43.659	26	
24	9	(United States) Kenny Noyes	FTR	20	+47.476	34	
25	19	(Belgium) Xavier Siméon	Tech 3	20	+47.755	35	
26	21	(Spain) Javier Forés	Suter	20	+50.355	21	
27	4	(Switzerland) Randy Krummenacher	Kalex	20	+50.544	29	
28	25	(Italy) Alex Baldolini	Suter	20	+1:04.879	31	
29	39	(Venezuela) Robertino Pietri	Suter	20	+1:09.672	30	
30	35	(Italy) Raffaele De Rosa	Moriwaki	20	+1:09.781	36	
31	45	(United Kingdom) Scott Redding	Suter	20	+1:23.743	10	
32	96	(Qatar) Nasser Al Malki	Moriwaki	20	+1:39.105	39	
Ret	14	(Thailand) Ratthapark Wilairot	FTR	10	Accident	27	
Ret	49	(United Kingdom) Kev Coghlan	FTR	6	Accident	33	
Ret	93	(Spain) Marc Márquez	Suter	4	Accident	2	
Ret	64	(Colombia) Santiago Hernández	FTR	4	Accident	32	
Ret	13	(Australia) Anthony West	MZ-RE Honda	4	Accident	37	
Ret	75	(Italy) Mattia Pasini	FTR	3	Accident	13	
Ret	95	(Qatar) Mashel Al Naimi	Moriwaki	0	Accident	38	
OFFICIAL MOTO2 REPORT

== 125 cc classification ==
Pos.	No.	Rider	Bike	Laps	Time/Retired	Grid	Points
1	18	(Spain) Nicolás Terol	Aprilia	18	38:28.687	1	25
2	11	(Germany) Sandro Cortese	Aprilia	18	+7.710	2	20
3	33	(Spain) Sergio Gadea	Aprilia	18	+9.147	4	16
4	7	(Spain) Efrén Vázquez	Derbi	18	+9.514	3	13
5	94	(Germany) Jonas Folger	Aprilia	18	+9.698	6	11
6	5	(France) Johann Zarco	Derbi	18	+15.260	7	10
7	23	(Spain) Alberto Moncayo	Aprilia	18	+15.352	8	9
8	39	(Spain) Luis Salom	Aprilia	18	+15.696	10	8
9	25	(Spain) Maverick Viñales	Aprilia	18	+15.910	9	7
10	44	(Portugal) Miguel Oliveira	Aprilia	18	+27.396	12	6
11	55	(Spain) Héctor Faubel	Aprilia	18	+42.563	5	5
12	53	(Netherlands) Jasper Iwema	Aprilia	18	+43.772	21	4
13	52	(United Kingdom) Danny Kent	Aprilia	18	+44.001	13	3
14	15	(Italy) Simone Grotzkyj	Aprilia	18	+44.272	14	2
15	96	(France) Louis Rossi	Aprilia	18	+50.030	11	1
16	99	(United Kingdom) Danny Webb	Mahindra	18	+50.424	23	
17	31	(Finland) Niklas Ajo	Aprilia	18	+1:01.545	16	
18	17	(United Kingdom) Taylor Mackenzie	Aprilia	18	+1:02.931	20	
19	63	(Malaysia) Zulfahmi Khairuddin	Derbi	18	+1:05.192	17	
20	3	(Italy) Luigi Morciano	Aprilia	18	+1:05.273	19	
21	77	(Germany) Marcel Schrötter	Mahindra	18	+1:05.396	22	
22	19	(Italy) Alessandro Tonucci	Aprilia	18	+1:12.458	24	
23	84	(Czech Republic) Jakub Kornfeil	Aprilia	18	+1:30.629	26	
24	12	(Germany) Daniel Kartheininger	KTM	18	+1:30.792	29	
25	21	(United Kingdom) Harry Stafford	Aprilia	18	+1:30.798	28	
26	30	(Switzerland) Giulian Pedone	Aprilia	18	+1:54.387	27	
27	43	(Italy) Francesco Mauriello	Aprilia	18	+1:54.548	30	
28	26	(Spain) Adrián Martín	Aprilia	14	+4 laps	15	
Ret	36	(Spain) Joan Perelló	Aprilia	9	Retirement	25	
Ret	76	(Japan) Hiroki Ono	KTM	7	Retirement	18	
DNQ	69	(India) Sarath Kumar	Aprilia		Did not qualify		
OFFICIAL 125cc REPORT

== Championship standings after the race (MotoGP) ==
Below are the standings for the top five riders and constructors after round one has concluded.

Riders' Championship standings

Pos.	Rider	Points
1	(Australia) Casey Stoner	25
2	(Spain) Jorge Lorenzo	20
3	(Spain) Dani Pedrosa	16
4	(Italy) Andrea Dovizioso	13
5	(Italy) Marco Simoncelli	11

Constructors' Championship standings

Pos.	Constructor	Points
1	(Japan) Honda	25
2	(Japan) Yamaha	20
3	(Italy) Ducati	9

- Note: Only the top five positions are included for both sets of standings.

Previous race: 2010 Valencian Grand Prix	FIM Grand Prix World Championship; 2011 season	Next race: 2011 Spanish Grand Prix
Previous race: 2010 Qatar Grand Prix	Qatar motorcycle Grand Prix	Next race: 2012 Qatar Grand Prix
