= 2014 Moto2 World Championship =

5th running of the Moto2 World Championship

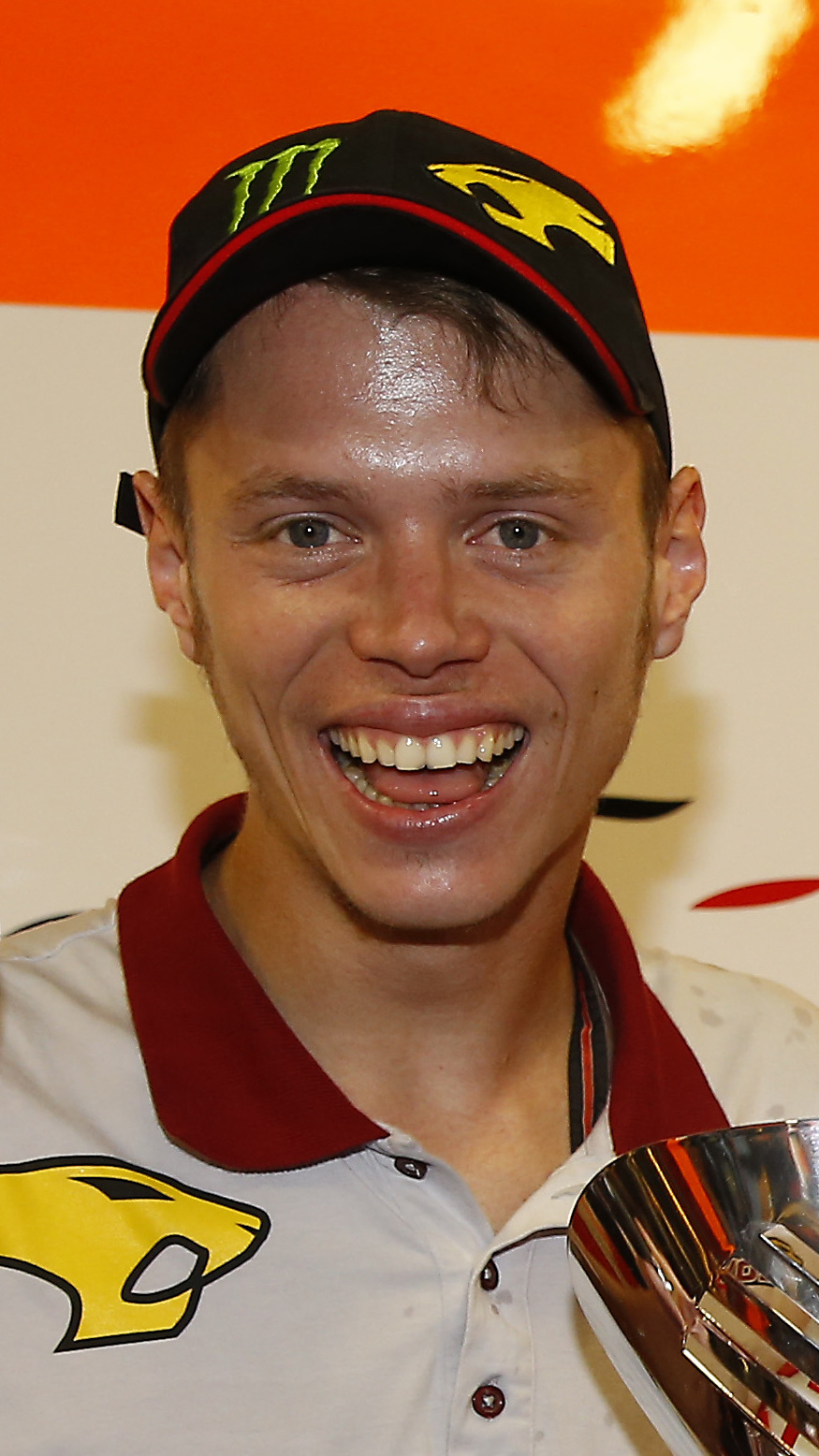
Esteve Rabat was the 2014 Moto2 World Riders' Champion.

The 2014 FIM Moto2 World Championship was the intermediate class of the 66th Fédération Internationale de Motocyclisme (FIM) Road Racing World Championship season. Pol Espargaró was the reigning series champion, but did not contest the season as he joined the series' premier class, MotoGP.

Scoring a record tally of points for the intermediate class, with 346, Marc VDS Racing Team rider Esteve Rabat wound up as the series champion, finishing 57 points clear of his teammate Mika Kallio. Rabat also set records for pole positions with 11, and tied the record for podiums with 14 – including 7 wins – matching Marc Márquez in the 2012 campaign. Kallio, a three-time winner, sealed the runner-up position in the championship after a collision with his closest challenger for the position, Maverick Viñales, in the final round of the season in Valencia. Both riders retired from the race as a result of the incident, giving Kallio the position by 15 points. Viñales' performances – his best results being four victories – were easily good enough for him to finish as the highest placed rookie in the championship standings, finishing almost 200 points clear of the next best rookie, his Paginas Amarillas HP 40 teammate Luis Salom, who finished eighth in the championship.

Fourth place in the championship was taken by Interwetten Sitag rider Thomas Lüthi, who won late season races in Japan and Valencia; the latter coming after Rabat was slow coming off the final corner of the race. He finished just ahead of compatriot Dominique Aegerter, who for the Technomag carXpert team, achieved his first Grand Prix victory during the 2014 season. Having scored his first pole position in qualifying, Aegerter took his maiden victory in his 129th start, fending off Kallio's advances in the closing stages. The only other race victor was Anthony West for the QMMF Racing Team, winning a wet race at Assen; it was his second race win at the track, having triumphed in similar conditions in 2003. Riding a Speed Up, it was the only time a Suter or Kalex did not win a race throughout the season. Kalex dominated the constructors' championship, amassing 430 points out of a maximum total of 450.

== Calendar ==
The Fédération Internationale de Motocyclisme released a 19-race provisional calendar on 2 October 2013. The calendar was updated on 13 December 2013 and again on 24 February 2014, resulting in an 18-race calendar.

The 2014 calendar originally saw the addition of two South American races, the series' first visit to the continent since 2004. A race in Argentina at the newly upgraded Autódromo Termas de Río Hondo is scheduled for 27 April and a race in Brazil at the Autódromo Internacional Nelson Piquet in Brasilia was scheduled for 28 September, but the latter was subsequently removed from the calendar. The round at MotorLand Aragón was also moved back a week, filling the date originally scheduled for Brazil.

Round	Date	Grand Prix	Circuit
1	23 March ‡	Commercial Bank Grand Prix of Qatar	Lusail International Circuit, Lusail
2	13 April	(United States) Red Bull Grand Prix of the Americas	Circuit of the Americas, Austin
3	27 April	Gran Premio Red Bull de la República Argentina	Autódromo Termas de Río Hondo, Termas de Río Hondo
4	4 May	(Spain) Gran Premio bwin de España	Circuito de Jerez, Jerez de la Frontera
5	18 May	Monster Energy Grand Prix de France	Bugatti Circuit, Le Mans
6	1 June	(Italy) Gran Premio d'Italia TIM	Mugello Circuit, Scarperia e San Piero
7	15 June	(Catalonia) Gran Premi Monster Energy de Catalunya	Circuit de Barcelona-Catalunya, Montmeló
8	28 June ††	(Netherlands) Iveco Daily TT Assen	TT Circuit Assen, Assen
9	13 July	(Germany) eni Motorrad Grand Prix Deutschland	Sachsenring, Hohenstein-Ernstthal
10	10 August	Red Bull Indianapolis Grand Prix	Indianapolis Motor Speedway, Speedway
11	17 August	(Czech Republic) bwin Grand Prix České republiky	Brno Circuit, Brno
12	31 August	(United Kingdom) Hertz British Grand Prix	Silverstone Circuit, Silverstone
13	14 September	Gran Premio TIM di San Marino e della Riviera di Rimini	Misano World Circuit, Misano Adriatico
14	28 September	(Aragon) Gran Premio Movistar de Aragón	MotorLand Aragón, Alcañiz
15	12 October	Motul Grand Prix of Japan	Motegi Circuit, Motegi
16	19 October	(Australia) Tissot Australian Grand Prix	Phillip Island Grand Prix Circuit, Phillip Island
17	26 October	(Malaysia) Shell Advance Malaysian Motorcycle Grand Prix	Sepang International Circuit, Sepang
18	9 November	(Valencian Community) Gran Premio Generali de la Comunitat Valenciana	Circuit Ricardo Tormo, Valencia

‡ = Night race
†† = Saturday race

== Teams and riders ==
A provisional entry list was released by the Fédération Internationale de Motocyclisme on 20 November 2013. An updated entry list was released on 14 January 2014. The final entry list was released on 28 February 2014. All Moto2 competitors raced with an identical CBR600RR inline-four engine developed by Honda. Teams competed with tyres supplied by Dunlop.

Team	Constructor	Motorcycle	No.	Rider	Rounds
(Switzerland) NGM Forward Racing	Forward KLX	Forward KLX	3	(Italy) Simone Corsi	1–4
(Switzerland) NGM Forward Racing	Forward KLX	Forward KLX	54	(Italy) Mattia Pasini	1–4
(Switzerland) NGM Forward Racing	Kalex	Kalex Moto2	3	(Italy) Simone Corsi	5–12
(Switzerland) NGM Forward Racing	Kalex	Kalex Moto2	20	(France) Florian Marino	13–18
(Switzerland) NGM Forward Racing	Kalex	Kalex Moto2	54	(Italy) Mattia Pasini	5–18
(Spain) AGR Team	Kalex	Kalex Moto2	49	(Spain) Axel Pons	All
(Spain) AGR Team	Kalex	Kalex Moto2	94	(Germany) Jonas Folger	All
(Germany) Dynavolt Intact GP	Kalex	Kalex Moto2	11	(Germany) Sandro Cortese	All
(Italy) Italtrans Racing Team	Kalex	Kalex Moto2	21	(Italy) Franco Morbidelli	All
(Italy) Italtrans Racing Team	Kalex	Kalex Moto2	60	(Spain) Julián Simón	All
(Japan) Idemitsu Honda Team Asia	Kalex	Kalex Moto2	25	(Malaysia) Azlan Shah	All
(Japan) Idemitsu Honda Team Asia	Kalex	Kalex Moto2	30	(Japan) Takaaki Nakagami	All
(Belgium) Marc VDS Racing Team	Kalex	Kalex Moto2	36	(Finland) Mika Kallio	All
(Belgium) Marc VDS Racing Team	Kalex	Kalex Moto2	53	(Spain) Esteve Rabat	All
(Belgium) Marc VDS Racing Team	Kalex	Kalex Moto2	41	(Australia) Aiden Wagner	16
Petronas Raceline Malaysia	Kalex	Kalex Moto2	55	(Malaysia) Hafizh Syahrin	All
(Spain) Pons HP 40 (Spain) Paginas Amarillas HP 40	Kalex	Kalex Moto2	39	(Spain) Luis Salom	All
(Spain) Pons HP 40 (Spain) Paginas Amarillas HP 40	Kalex	Kalex Moto2	40	(Spain) Maverick Viñales	All
(Spain) Pons HP 40 (Spain) Paginas Amarillas HP 40	Kalex	Kalex Moto2	57	(Spain) Edgar Pons	4
(Spain) APH PTT The Pizza SAG (Spain) SAG Team	Kalex	Kalex Moto2	10	(Thailand) Thitipong Warokorn	All
(Spain) APH PTT The Pizza SAG (Spain) SAG Team	Kalex	Kalex Moto2	96	(France) Louis Rossi	All
(Spain) Argentina TSR Motorsport	Kalex	Kalex Moto2	99	(Argentina) Sebastián Porto	3
(Japan) Moriwaki Racing	Moriwaki	Moriwaki MD600	72	(Japan) Yuki Takahashi	15
(Monaco) Teluru Team JiR Webike	NTS	NTS NH6	71	(Japan) Tomoyoshi Koyama	15–17
(Monaco) Teluru Team JiR Webike	NTS	NTS NH6	45	(Japan) Tetsuta Nagashima	18
(Monaco) Teluru Team JiR Webike	TSR	TSR TSR6	45	(Japan) Tetsuta Nagashima	1–12
(Monaco) Teluru Team JiR Webike	TSR	TSR TSR6	64	(Italy) Federico Caricasulo	13
(Monaco) Teluru Team JiR Webike	TSR	TSR TSR6	9	(United States) Kenny Noyes	14
(Qatar) QMMF Racing Team	Speed Up	Speed Up SF14	95	(Australia) Anthony West	All
(Qatar) QMMF Racing Team	Speed Up	Speed Up SF14	97	(Spain) Román Ramos	All
(Qatar) QMMF Racing Team	Speed Up	Speed Up SF14	98	(Qatar) Mashel Al Naimi	1
(Qatar) QMMF Racing Team	Speed Up	Speed Up SF14	33	(Germany) Nina Prinz	9
(Italy) Speed Up	Speed Up	Speed Up SF14	22	(United Kingdom) Sam Lowes	All
(Malaysia) AirAsia Caterham Moto Racing (Malaysia) AirAsia Caterham (Malaysia) Caterham Moto Racing	Caterham Suter	Suter MMX2	2	(United States) Josh Herrin	1–2, 5–12
(Malaysia) AirAsia Caterham Moto Racing (Malaysia) AirAsia Caterham (Malaysia) Caterham Moto Racing	Caterham Suter	Suter MMX2	14	(Thailand) Ratthapark Wilairot	4, 13–18
(Malaysia) AirAsia Caterham Moto Racing (Malaysia) AirAsia Caterham (Malaysia) Caterham Moto Racing	Caterham Suter	Suter MMX2	5	(France) Johann Zarco	All
(United Kingdom) AGT Rea Racing	Suter	Suter MMX2	8	(United Kingdom) Gino Rea	All
(Italy) Gresini Moto2 (Italy) Federal Oil Gresini Moto2	Suter	Suter MMX2	7	(Italy) Lorenzo Baldassarri	All
(Italy) Gresini Moto2 (Italy) Federal Oil Gresini Moto2	Suter	Suter MMX2	19	(Belgium) Xavier Siméon	All
(Switzerland) Interwetten Paddock Moto2 (Switzerland) Interwetten Sitag	Suter	Suter MMX2	12	(Switzerland) Thomas Lüthi	All
(Italy) IodaRacing Project (Italy) Octo IodaRacing Team	Suter	Suter MMX2	4	(Switzerland) Randy Krummenacher	All
(Spain) Mapfre Aspar Team Moto2	Suter	Suter MMX2	18	(Spain) Nicolás Terol	1–11, 13–18
(Spain) Mapfre Aspar Team Moto2	Suter	Suter MMX2	80	(Belgium) Dakota Mamola	12
(Spain) Mapfre Aspar Team Moto2	Suter	Suter MMX2	81	(Spain) Jordi Torres	All
(Italy) Tasca Racing Moto2	Suter	Suter MMX2	15	(San Marino) Alex de Angelis	1–10
(Italy) Tasca Racing Moto2	Suter	Suter MMX2	84	(Italy) Riccardo Russo	11–15
(Italy) Tasca Racing Moto2	Suter	Suter MMX2	42	(Australia) Max Croker	16
(Italy) Tasca Racing Moto2	Suter	Suter MMX2	44	(Italy) Roberto Rolfo	17–18
(France) Technomag carXpert	Suter	Suter MMX2	70	(Switzerland) Robin Mulhauser	All
(France) Technomag carXpert	Suter	Suter MMX2	77	(Switzerland) Dominique Aegerter	All
(Italy) Ciatti	Suter	Suter MMX2	32	(Italy) Federico Fuligni	13
(Czech Republic) Montáže Brož Racing Team	Suter	Suter MMX2	59	(Czech Republic) Miroslav Popov	11, 13
(United Kingdom) Brough Superior Racing	Taylor Made	TaylorMade Carbon 2	9	(United Kingdom) Jeremy McWilliams	12
(France) Singha Eneos Yamaha Tech 3	Tech 3	Tech 3 Mistral 610	46	(Thailand) Decha Kraisart	17
(France) Singha Eneos Yamaha Tech 3	Tech 3	Tech 3 Mistral 610	65	(Thailand) Chalermpol Polamai	15
(France) Tech 3	Tech 3	Tech 3 Mistral 610	23	(Germany) Marcel Schrötter	All
(France) Tech 3	Tech 3	Tech 3 Mistral 610	88	(Spain) Ricard Cardús	All
(France) Tech 3	Tech 3	Tech 3 Mistral 610	92	(Spain) Álex Mariñelarena	(Note: Álex Mariñelarena was injured in a pre-season testing crash at Circuit Paul Ricard. He did not compete in any races during the 2014 season.)
(France) Promoto Sport	TransFIORmers	???	90	(France) Lucas Mahias	5, 11, 18

Key
Regular rider
Wildcard rider
Replacement rider

=== Rider changes ===
- Esteve Rabat joined Marc VDS Racing Team, replacing Scott Redding who moved up to MotoGP with GO&FUN Gresini.
- Maverick Viñales moved up to Moto2 with Pons HP 40, filling the seat vacated by Pol Espargaró who moved up to MotoGP with Monster Yamaha Tech 3.

== Results and standings ==
=== Grands Prix ===
Round	Grand Prix	Pole position	Fastest lap	Winning rider	Winning team	Winning constructor	Report
1	Qatar motorcycle Grand Prix	(Spain) Esteve Rabat	(Spain) Maverick Viñales	(Spain) Esteve Rabat	(Belgium) Marc VDS Racing Team	(Germany) Kalex	Report
2	(United States) Motorcycle Grand Prix of the Americas	(Spain) Esteve Rabat	(Spain) Maverick Viñales	(Spain) Maverick Viñales	(Spain) Pons HP 40	(Germany) Kalex	Report
3	(Argentina) Argentine Republic motorcycle Grand Prix	(Spain) Esteve Rabat	(Spain) Luis Salom	(Spain) Esteve Rabat	(Belgium) Marc VDS Racing Team	(Germany) Kalex	Report
4	(Spain) Spanish motorcycle Grand Prix	(Finland) Mika Kallio	(Germany) Jonas Folger	(Finland) Mika Kallio	(Belgium) Marc VDS Racing Team	(Germany) Kalex	Report
5	(France) French motorcycle Grand Prix	(Germany) Jonas Folger	(Spain) Maverick Viñales	(Finland) Mika Kallio	(Belgium) Marc VDS Racing Team	(Germany) Kalex	Report
6	(Italy) Italian motorcycle Grand Prix	(Spain) Esteve Rabat	(Spain) Esteve Rabat	(Spain) Esteve Rabat	(Belgium) Marc VDS Racing Team	(Germany) Kalex	Report
7	(Catalonia) Catalan motorcycle Grand Prix	(Spain) Esteve Rabat	(Spain) Esteve Rabat	(Spain) Esteve Rabat	(Belgium) Marc VDS Racing Team	(Germany) Kalex	Report
8	(Netherlands) Dutch TT	(Spain) Esteve Rabat	(Switzerland) Dominique Aegerter	(Australia) Anthony West	(Qatar) QMMF Racing Team	(Italy) Speed Up	Report
9	(Germany) German motorcycle Grand Prix	(Switzerland) Dominique Aegerter	(Finland) Mika Kallio	(Switzerland) Dominique Aegerter	(France) Technomag carXpert	(Switzerland) Suter	Report
10	Indianapolis motorcycle Grand Prix	(Finland) Mika Kallio	(Finland) Mika Kallio	(Finland) Mika Kallio	(Belgium) Marc VDS Racing Team	(Germany) Kalex	Report
11	Czech Republic motorcycle Grand Prix	(Spain) Esteve Rabat	(Spain) Esteve Rabat	(Spain) Esteve Rabat	(Belgium) Marc VDS Racing Team	(Germany) Kalex	Report
12	(United Kingdom) British motorcycle Grand Prix	(France) Johann Zarco	(Spain) Esteve Rabat	(Spain) Esteve Rabat	(Belgium) Marc VDS Racing Team	(Germany) Kalex	Report
13	San Marino and Rimini Riviera motorcycle Grand Prix	(Finland) Mika Kallio	(Spain) Esteve Rabat	(Spain) Esteve Rabat	(Belgium) Marc VDS Racing Team	(Germany) Kalex	Report
14	Aragon motorcycle Grand Prix	(Spain) Maverick Viñales	(Switzerland) Thomas Lüthi	(Spain) Maverick Viñales	(Spain) Paginas Amarillas HP 40	(Germany) Kalex	Report
15	(Japan) Japanese motorcycle Grand Prix	(Spain) Esteve Rabat	(Spain) Maverick Viñales	(Switzerland) Thomas Lüthi	(Switzerland) Interwetten Sitag	(Switzerland) Suter	Report
16	(Australia) Australian motorcycle Grand Prix	(Spain) Esteve Rabat	(Spain) Maverick Viñales	(Spain) Maverick Viñales	(Spain) Paginas Amarillas HP 40	(Germany) Kalex	Report
17	(Malaysia) Malaysian motorcycle Grand Prix	(Spain) Esteve Rabat	(Finland) Mika Kallio	(Spain) Maverick Viñales	(Spain) Paginas Amarillas HP 40	(Germany) Kalex	Report
18	Valencian Community motorcycle Grand Prix	(Spain) Esteve Rabat	(Switzerland) Thomas Lüthi	(Switzerland) Thomas Lüthi	(Switzerland) Interwetten Sitag	(Switzerland) Suter	Report

=== Riders' standings ===
Scoring system

Points were awarded to the top fifteen finishers. A rider had to finish the race to earn points.

Position	**1st**	**2nd**	**3rd**	**4th**	**5th**	**6th**	**7th**	**8th**	**9th**	**10th**	**11th**	**12th**	**13th**	**14th**	**15th**
Points	25	20	16	13	11	10	9	8	7	6	5	4	3	2	1

Pos	Rider	Bike	QAT (Qatar)	AME (United States)	ARG (Argentina)	SPA (Spain)	FRA (France)	ITA (Italy)	CAT (Catalonia)	NED (Netherlands)	GER (Germany)	INP (Indianapolis)	CZE (Czech Republic)	GBR (United Kingdom)	RSM (San Marino)	ARA (Aragon)	JPN (Japan)	AUS (Australia)	MAL (Malaysia)	VAL (Valencian Community)	Pts
1	(Spain) Esteve Rabat	Kalex	**1**	**2**	**1**	4	3	**1**	**1**	**8**	4	4	**1**	1	1	2	**3**	**3**	**3**	**2**	346
2	(Finland) Mika Kallio	Kalex	2	4	7	**1**	1	6	4	3	2	**1**	2	2	**2**	7	5	4	2	Ret	289
3	(Spain) Maverick Viñales	Kalex	4	1	Ret	5	4	9	2	2	5	2	6	3	4	**1**	2	1	1	Ret	274
4	(Switzerland) Thomas Lüthi	Suter	3	6	19	10	8	Ret	5	6	9	Ret	4	5	5	4	1	2	8	1	194
5	(Switzerland) Dominique Aegerter	Suter	Ret	3	4	2	7	5	14	21	**1**	3	5	21	6	6	18	8	5	6	172
6	(France) Johann Zarco	Caterham Suter	23	Ret	18	8	Ret	7	3	4	Ret	10	9	**4**	3	3	4	Ret	4	3	146
7	(Italy) Simone Corsi	Forward KLX	5	5	5	Ret															100
7	(Italy) Simone Corsi	Kalex					2	4	Ret	13	3	5	12	Ret							100
8	(Spain) Luis Salom	Kalex	14	Ret	3	6	5	2	Ret	15	14	26	Ret	19	15	13	15	17	11	4	85
9	(Germany) Sandro Cortese	Kalex	7	14	9	9	12	13	Ret	Ret	Ret	6	3	18	12	12	Ret	6	7	Ret	85
10	(Germany) Marcel Schrötter	Tech 3	Ret	9	11	Ret	11	12	9	12	12	14	10	14	11	10	29	7	10	8	80
11	(Italy) Franco Morbidelli	Kalex	25	17	13	20	10	10	21	24	6	Ret	8	6	7	5	7	13	Ret	21	75
12	(Australia) Anthony West	Speed Up	9	7	12	11	14	18	10	1	17	9	22	22	17	Ret	Ret	22	18	9	72
13	(United Kingdom) Sam Lowes	Speed Up	6	16	8	Ret	9	8	Ret	Ret	20	24	Ret	7	18	9	Ret	5	Ret	7	69
14	(Belgium) Xavier Siméon	Suter	24	Ret	2	7	Ret	14	Ret	25	10	Ret	14	Ret	16	Ret	10	9	19	5	63
15	(Germany) Jonas Folger	Kalex	11	Ret	16	3	**6**	3	Ret	23	Ret	18	15	Ret	19	23	12	15	9	13	63
16	(Spain) Jordi Torres	Suter	8	26	10	12	17	11	Ret	26	Ret	12	18	11	21	8	11	10	15	11	57
17	(Spain) Julián Simón	Kalex	16	23	17	14	Ret	22	12	7	16	Ret	7	12	8	16	6	20	6	Ret	56
18	(Spain) Ricard Cardús	Tech 3	12	10	Ret	13	26	19	7	16	11	15	20	16	Ret	14	9	16	12	12	45
19	(Malaysia) Hafizh Syahrin	Kalex	15	15	20	21	15	25	Ret	10	18	7	13	8	20	11	8	Ret	Ret	16	42
20	(San Marino) Alex de Angelis	Suter	Ret	8	6	17	Ret	17	Ret	5	Ret	8									37
21	(Italy) Mattia Pasini	Forward KLX	17	12	Ret	18															35
21	(Italy) Mattia Pasini	Kalex					Ret	Ret	6	17	8	DNS	17	9	13	21	Ret	Ret	13	Ret	35
22	(Japan) Takaaki Nakagami	Kalex	DSQ	11	15	Ret	16	16	13	14	21	11	19	15	10	15	13	11	Ret	14	34
23	(Spain) Axel Pons	Kalex	Ret	19	26	16	Ret	15	8	Ret	15	16	11	10	9	Ret	Ret	DNS	Ret	Ret	28
24	(Switzerland) Randy Krummenacher	Suter	13	13	27	15	13	26	25	Ret	7	DNS	24	13	14	27	21	19	26	22	24
25	(Italy) Lorenzo Baldassarri	Suter	Ret	Ret	28	Ret	20	23	11	9	Ret	17	Ret	Ret	25	25	17	14	17	10	20
26	(France) Louis Rossi	Kalex	10	Ret	25	Ret	Ret	20	15	28	13	13	16	17	26	20	16	12	Ret	15	18
27	(United Kingdom) Gino Rea	Suter	Ret	25	30	26	19	21	22	11	25	25	26	20	22	17	14	21	Ret	24	7
28	(Spain) Nicolás Terol	Suter	Ret	Ret	14	DNS	21	24	20	22	19	21	25		Ret	29	22	18	24	18	2
29	(Italy) Roberto Rolfo	Suter																	14	20	2
	(France) Florian Marino	Kalex													24	28	20	25	16	23	0
	(United States) Josh Herrin	Caterham Suter	Ret	Ret			22	Ret	16	18	Ret	28	21	24							0
	(Switzerland) Robin Mulhauser	Suter	22	24	29	27	25	30	18	27	24	22	30	27	29	26	28	DNS	DNS	17	0
	(Spain) Román Ramos	Speed Up	19	21	22	23	23	29	17	19	23	19	27	26	27	18	27	23	22	25	0
	(Malaysia) Azlan Shah	Kalex	18	18	21	24	24	27	19	Ret	28	20	28	25	32	19	24	DNS	20	27	0
	(France) Lucas Mahias	TransFIORmers					18						31							Ret	0
	(Thailand) Ratthapark Wilairot	Caterham Suter				19									23	22	19	Ret	Ret	19	0
	(Japan) Tetsuta Nagashima	TSR	21	20	31	22	Ret	28	23	20	22	23	Ret	DNS							0
	(Japan) Tetsuta Nagashima	NTS																		26	0
	(Thailand) Thitipong Warokorn	Kalex	20	22	24	28	Ret	31	24	29	26	27	29	28	30	30	25	Ret	21	28	0
	(Japan) Tomoyoshi Koyama	NTS															23	24	23		0
	(Italy) Riccardo Russo	Suter											23	23	Ret	24	Ret				0
	(Argentina) Sebastián Porto	Kalex			23																0
	(Thailand) Decha Kraisart	Tech 3																	25		0
	(Spain) Edgar Pons	Kalex				25															0
	(Australia) Aiden Wagner	Kalex																26			0
	(Japan) Yuki Takahashi	Moriwaki															26				0
	(Australia) Max Croker	Suter																27			0
	(Germany) Nina Prinz	Speed Up									27										0
	(Italy) Federico Caricasulo	TSR													28						0
	(United Kingdom) Jeremy McWilliams	Taylor Made												29							0
	(Thailand) Chalermpol Polamai	Tech 3															30				0
	(Belgium) Dakota Mamola	Suter												30							0
	(Italy) Federico Fuligni	Suter													31						0
	(Czech Republic) Miroslav Popov	Suter											Ret		Ret						0
	(United States) Kenny Noyes	TSR														Ret					0
	(Qatar) Mashel Al Naimi	Speed Up	Ret																		0
Pos	Rider	Bike	QAT (Qatar)	AME (United States)	ARG (Argentina)	SPA (Spain)	FRA (France)	ITA (Italy)	CAT (Catalonia)	NED (Netherlands)	GER (Germany)	INP (Indianapolis)	CZE (Czech Republic)	GBR (United Kingdom)	RSM (San Marino)	ARA (Aragon)	JPN (Japan)	AUS (Australia)	MAL (Malaysia)	VAL (Valencian Community)	Pts

Colour	Result
Gold	Winner
Silver	Second place
Bronze	Third place
Green	Points classification
Blue	Non-points classification
Blue	Non-classified finish (NC)
Purple	Retired, not classified (Ret)
Red	Did not qualify (DNQ)
Red	Did not pre-qualify (DNPQ)
Black	Disqualified (DSQ)
White	Did not start (DNS)
White	Withdrew (WD)
White	Race cancelled (C)
Blank	Did not practice (DNP)
Blank	Did not arrive (DNA)
Blank	Excluded (EX)

**Bold** – Pole
Italics – Fastest Lap
Light blue – Rookie

=== Constructors' standings ===
Each constructor received the same number of points as their best placed rider in each race.

Pos	Constructor	QAT (Qatar)	AME (United States)	ARG (Argentina)	SPA (Spain)	FRA (France)	ITA (Italy)	CAT (Catalonia)	NED (Netherlands)	GER (Germany)	INP (Indianapolis)	CZE (Czech Republic)	GBR (United Kingdom)	RSM (San Marino)	ARA (Aragon)	JPN (Japan)	AUS (Australia)	MAL (Malaysia)	VAL (Valencian Community)	Pts
1	(Germany) Kalex	1	1	1	1	1	1	1	2	2	1	1	1	1	1	2	1	1	2	430
2	(Switzerland) Suter	3	3	2	2	7	5	5	5	1	3	4	5	5	4	1	2	5	1	284
3	(Malaysia) Caterham Suter	23	Ret	18	8	22	7	3	4	Ret	10	9	4	3	3	4	Ret	4	3	146
4	(Italy) Speed Up	6	7	8	11	9	8	10	1	17	9	22	7	17	9	27	5	18	7	121
5	(France) Tech 3	12	9	11	13	11	12	7	12	11	14	10	14	11	10	9	7	10	8	97
6	(Switzerland) Forward KLX	5	5	5	18															33
	(France) TransFIORmers					18						31							Ret	0
	(Japan) TSR	21	20	31	22	Ret	28	23	20	22	23	Ret	DNS	28	Ret					0
	(Japan) NTS															23	24	23	26	0
	(Japan) Moriwaki															26				0
	(United Kingdom) Taylor Made												29							0
Pos	Constructor	QAT (Qatar)	AME (United States)	ARG (Argentina)	SPA (Spain)	FRA (France)	ITA (Italy)	CAT (Catalonia)	NED (Netherlands)	GER (Germany)	INP (Indianapolis)	CZE (Czech Republic)	GBR (United Kingdom)	RSM (San Marino)	ARA (Aragon)	JPN (Japan)	AUS (Australia)	MAL (Malaysia)	VAL (Valencian Community)	Pts
