= Miroslav Popov =

Czech motorcycle racer

- Nationality: Czech
- Born: 14 June 1995 (age 31); Dvůr Králové nad Labem, Czech Republic
Motorcycle racing career statistics
Moto2 World Championship
Active years	2014
Manufacturers	Suter
Championships	0
2014 championship position	NC (0 pts)
Starts / Wins / Podiums / Poles / F. laps / Points; 2 / 0 / 0 / 0 / 0 / 0
Moto3 World Championship
Active years	2012
Manufacturers	Mahindra
Championships	0
2012 championship position	NC (0 pts)
Starts / Wins / Podiums / Poles / F. laps / Points; 4 / 0 / 0 / 0 / 0 / 0
125cc World Championship
Active years	2011
Manufacturers	Aprilia
Championships	0
2011 championship position	30th (3 pts)
Starts / Wins / Podiums / Poles / F. laps / Points; 3 / 0 / 0 / 0 / 0 / 3
Supersport World Championship
Active years	2015
Manufacturers	MV Agusta
Championships	0
2015 championship position	NC (0 pts)
Starts / Wins / Podiums / Poles / F. laps / Points; 1 / 0 / 0 / 0 / 0 / 0

Miroslav Popov (born 14 June 1995) is a Czech motorcycle racer.

== Career statistics ==
=== Career highlights ===
- 2016 - NC, FIM Superstock 1000 Cup, Yamaha YZF-R1

=== Races by year ===
(key) (Races in bold indicate pole position, races in italics indicate fastest lap)

Year	Bike	1	2	3	4	5	6	7	8	9	10	Pos	Pts
2014	Suter	JER	ARA1; 7	ARA2; Ret	CAT; 6	ALB; Ret	NAV1; 5	NAV2; 17	ALG1; 5	ALG2; 10	VAL; Ret	9th	47

=== Grand Prix motorcycle racing ===
==== By season ====
Season	Class	Motorcycle	Team	Race	Win	Podium	Pole	FLap	Pts	Plcd
2011	125cc	Aprilia	Ellegi Racing	3	0	0	0	0	3	30th
2012	Moto3	Mahindra	Mahindra Racing	4	0	0	0	0	0	NC
2014	Moto2	Suter	Montáže Brož Racing Team	2	0	0	0	0	0	NC
Total				**9**	**0**	**0**	**0**	**0**	**3**	

==== Races by year ====
(key)

Year	Class	Bike	1	2	3	4	5	6	7	8	9	10	11	12	13	14	15	16	17	18	Pos	Pts
2011	125cc	Aprilia	QAT	SPA	POR	FRA	CAT	GBR	NED	ITA; 19	GER	CZE; 17	INP	RSM; 13	ARA	JPN	AUS	MAL	VAL		30th	3
2012	Moto3	Mahindra	QAT	SPA	POR	FRA	CAT	GBR	NED	GER	ITA	INP	CZE; Ret	RSM; 19	ARA; Ret	JPN	MAL	AUS	VAL; Ret		NC	0
2014	Moto2	Suter	QAT	AME	ARG	SPA	FRA	ITA	CAT	NED	GER	INP	CZE; Ret	GBR	RSM; Ret	ARA	JPN	AUS	MAL	VAL	NC	0

=== Supersport World Championship ===
==== Races by year ====
(key)

Year	Bike	1	2	3	4	5	6	7	8	9	10	11	12	Pos.	Pts
2015	MV Agusta	AUS	THA	SPA	NED	ITA	GBR	POR	ITA	MAL	SPA; 18	FRA	QAT	NC	0

=== Superstock 1000 Cup ===
==== Races by year ====
(key) (Races in bold indicate pole position) (Races in italics indicate fastest lap)

Year	Bike	1	2	3	4	5	6	7	8	Pos	Pts
2016	Yamaha	ARA; 23	NED	IMO	DON	MIS	LAU	MAG	JER	NC	0
