= Max Croker =

Australian motorcycle racer

- Nationality: Australian
- Born: 13 May 1998 (age 28); Australia
- Current team: Mat Mladin Racing
- Bike number: 41
Motorcycle racing career statistics
Moto2 World Championship
Active years	2014
Manufacturers	Suter
2014 championship position	NC (0 pts)
Starts / Wins / Podiums / Poles / F. laps / Points; 1 / 0 / 0 / 0 / 0 / 0

Max Croker (born 13 May 1998 in Australia) is an Australian motorcycle racer. He competed in the Australian Supersport Championship, aboard a Suzuki GSX-R600.

== Grand Prix motorcycle racing ==
=== By season ===
Season	Class	Motorcycle	Team	Number	Race	Win	Podium	Pole	FLap	Pts	Plcd
2014	Moto2	Suter	Tasca Racing Moto2	42	1	0	0	0	0	0	NC
Total					1	0	0	0	0	0	

=== Races by year ===
Year	Class	Bike	1	2	3	4	5	6	7	8	9	10	11	12	13	14	15	16	17	18	Pos	Points
2014	Moto2	Suter	QAT	AME	ARG	SPA	FRA	ITA	CAT	NED	GER	INP	CZE	GBR	RSM	ARA	JPN	AUS; 27	MAL	VAL	NC	0
