= Nina Prinz =

German motorcycle racer

- Nationality: German
- Born: 5 November 1982 (age 44); Kassel, Germany
- Current team: QMMF Racing Team
- Bike number: 96
- Website: https://www.ninaprinz.de/
Motorcycle racing career statistics
Moto2 World Championship
| Active years | 2014 |
| Manufacturers | Speed Up |
| 2014 championship position | NC (0 pts) |
Starts / Wins / Podiums / Poles / F. laps / Points; 1 / 0 / 0 / 0 / 0 / 0

Nina Prinz (born 5 November 1982 in Kassel) is a German motorcycle racer. She competed in the Qatari Superbike Championship aboard a Kawasaki ZX-10R.

== Grand Prix motorcycle racing ==
=== By season ===
| Season | Class | Motorcycle | Team | Number | Race | Win | Podium | Pole | FLap | Pts | Plcd |
|---|---|---|---|---|---|---|---|---|---|---|---|
| 2014 | Moto2 | Speed Up | QMMF Racing Team | 33 | 1 | 0 | 0 | 0 | 0 | 0 | NC |
| Total | | | | | 1 | 0 | 0 | 0 | 0 | 0 | |

=== Races by year ===
| Year | Class | Bike | 1 | 2 | 3 | 4 | 5 | 6 | 7 | 8 | 9 | 10 | 11 | 12 | 13 | 14 | 15 | 16 | 17 | 18 | Pos | Points |
|---|---|---|---|---|---|---|---|---|---|---|---|---|---|---|---|---|---|---|---|---|---|---|
| 2014 | Moto2 | Speed Up | QAT | AME | ARG | SPA | FRA | ITA | CAT | NED | GER; 27 | INP | CZE | GBR | RSM | ARA | JPN | AUS | MAL | VAL | NC | 0 |
