= Chalermpol Polamai =

Thai motorcycle racer

- Nationality: Thai
- Born: 29 July 1982 (age 44); Pathum Thani, Thailand
- Current team: Yamaha Thailand Racing Team
- Bike number: 65
Motorcycle racing career statistics
Moto2 World Championship
| Active years | 2014 |
| Manufacturers | Tech 3 |
| 2014 championship position | NC (0 pts) |
Starts / Wins / Podiums / Poles / F. laps / Points; 1 / 0 / 0 / 0 / 0 / 0
Supersport World Championship
| Active years | 2015, 2017 |
| Manufacturers | Yamaha |
| 2015 championship position | NC (0 pts) |
Starts / Wins / Podiums / Poles / F. laps / Points; 2 / 0 / 0 / 0 / 0 / 0

Chalermpol Polamai (born 29 July 1982 in Pathumthani) is a Thai professional motorcycle racer. He races a Yamaha YZF-R6.
