= 2014 German motorcycle Grand Prix =

(Germany) 2014 German Grand Prix
Race details
- Race 9 of 18 races in the 2014 Grand Prix motorcycle racing season
- Date: 13 July 2014
- Official name: eni Motorrad Grand Prix Deutschland
- Location: Sachsenring
- Course: Permanent racing facility; 3.671 km (2.281 mi)

MotoGP
Pole position
Rider	(Spain) Marc Márquez	Honda
Time	1:20.937	
Fastest lap
Rider	(Spain) Marc Márquez	Honda
Time	1:22.037 on lap 21	
Podium
First	(Spain) Marc Márquez	Honda
Second	(Spain) Dani Pedrosa	Honda
Third	(Spain) Jorge Lorenzo	Yamaha

Moto2
Pole position
Rider	(Switzerland) Dominique Aegerter	Suter
Time	1:24.761	
Fastest lap
Rider	(Finland) Mika Kallio	Kalex
Time	1:24.902 on lap 14	
Podium
First	(Switzerland) Dominique Aegerter	Suter
Second	(Finland) Mika Kallio	Kalex
Third	(Italy) Simone Corsi	Kalex

Moto3
Pole position
Rider	(Australia) Jack Miller	KTM
Time	1:26.997	
Fastest lap
Rider	(South Africa) Brad Binder	Mahindra
Time	1:26.877 on lap 8	
Podium
First	(Australia) Jack Miller	KTM
Second	(South Africa) Brad Binder	Mahindra
Third	(France) Alexis Masbou	Honda

The 2014 German motorcycle Grand Prix was the ninth round of the 2014 MotoGP season. It was held at the Sachsenring in Hohenstein-Ernstthal on 13 July 2014.

A light rain shortly before the MotoGP race led a large number of riders to choose to go to the grid with wet weather tyres. However, the rain started to dry quickly causing a number of riders to switch to slicks at the end of the formation lap which meant those riders had to start from pit lane. This resulted in only 9 of the 23 riders starting on the grid. Only three riders on the grid were on slicks (Stefan Bradl, Hiroshi Aoyama, Karel Abraham). Stefan Bradl, who swapped to slicks between the sighting and warm up laps, was the only rider on any of the first five rows.

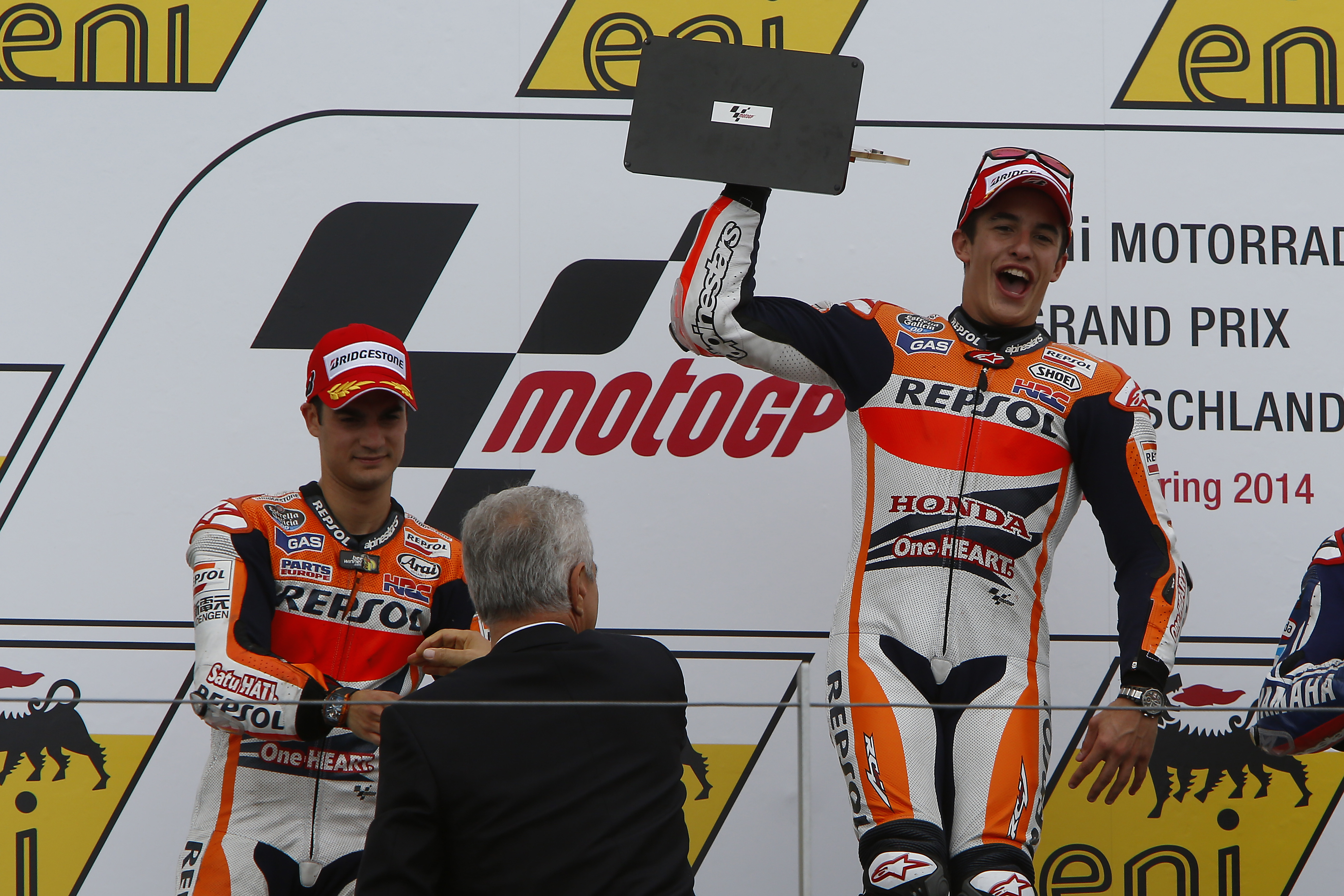
Dani Pedrosa and Marc Márquez, celebrating on the podium after finishing second and first at the MotoGP race.

== Classification ==
=== MotoGP ===
Pos.	No.	Rider	Team	Manufacturer	Laps	Time/Retired	Grid	Points
1	93	(Spain) Marc Márquez	Repsol Honda Team	Honda	30	41:47.664	1	25
2	26	(Spain) Dani Pedrosa	Repsol Honda Team	Honda	30	+1.466	2	20
3	99	(Spain) Jorge Lorenzo	Movistar Yamaha MotoGP	Yamaha	30	+10.317	5	16
4	46	(Italy) Valentino Rossi	Movistar Yamaha MotoGP	Yamaha	30	+19.194	6	13
5	29	(Italy) Andrea Iannone	Pramac Racing	Ducati	30	+23.509	7	11
6	41	(Spain) Aleix Espargaró	NGM Forward Racing	Forward Yamaha	30	+27.809	4	10
7	44	(Spain) Pol Espargaró	Monster Yamaha Tech 3	Yamaha	30	+33.253	8	9
8	4	(Italy) Andrea Dovizioso	Ducati Team	Ducati	30	+33.868	11	8
9	19	(Spain) Álvaro Bautista	Go&Fun Honda Gresini	Honda	30	+34.231	10	7
10	35	(United Kingdom) Cal Crutchlow	Ducati Team	Ducati	30	+34.676	15	6
11	45	(United Kingdom) Scott Redding	Go&Fun Honda Gresini	Honda	30	+37.744	14	5
12	7	(Japan) Hiroshi Aoyama	Drive M7 Aspar	Honda	30	+45.018	16	4
13	17	(Czech Republic) Karel Abraham	Cardion AB Motoracing	Honda	30	+45.177	17	3
14	69	(United States) Nicky Hayden	Drive M7 Aspar	Honda	30	+46.676	12	2
15	9	(Italy) Danilo Petrucci	Octo IodaRacing Team	ART	30	+52.769	23	1
16	6	(Germany) Stefan Bradl	LCR Honda MotoGP	Honda	30	+53.889	3	
17	68	(Colombia) Yonny Hernández	Energy T.I. Pramac Racing	Ducati	30	+54.476	13	
18	8	(Spain) Héctor Barberá	Avintia Racing	Avintia	30	+56.215	20	
19	38	(United Kingdom) Bradley Smith	Monster Yamaha Tech 3	Yamaha	30	+56.293	9	
20	5	(United States) Colin Edwards	NGM Forward Racing	Forward Yamaha	30	+1:04.083	19	
21	23	(Australia) Broc Parkes	Paul Bird Motorsport	PBM	30	+1:10.928	22	
22	63	(France) Mike Di Meglio	Avintia Racing	Avintia	30	+1:19.975	21	
Ret	70	(United Kingdom) Michael Laverty	Paul Bird Motorsport	PBM	17	Accident	18	

=== Moto2 ===
Pos.	No.	Rider	Manufacturer	Laps	Time/Retired	Grid	Points
1	77	(Switzerland) Dominique Aegerter	Suter	29	41:12.461	1	25
2	36	(Finland) Mika Kallio	Kalex	29	+0.091	2	20
3	3	(Italy) Simone Corsi	Kalex	29	+10.514	6	16
4	53	(Spain) Esteve Rabat	Kalex	29	+10.666	3	13
5	40	(Spain) Maverick Viñales	Kalex	29	+11.418	13	11
6	21	(Italy) Franco Morbidelli	Kalex	29	+14.100	5	10
7	4	(Switzerland) Randy Krummenacher	Suter	29	+21.883	10	9
8	54	(Italy) Mattia Pasini	Kalex	29	+21.976	18	8
9	12	(Switzerland) Thomas Lüthi	Suter	29	+22.049	8	7
10	19	(Belgium) Xavier Siméon	Suter	29	+26.510	11	6
11	88	(Spain) Ricard Cardús	Tech 3	29	+26.666	16	5
12	23	(Germany) Marcel Schrötter	Tech 3	29	+33.044	14	4
13	96	(France) Louis Rossi	Kalex	29	+33.420	22	3
14	39	(Spain) Luis Salom	Kalex	29	+37.193	24	2
15	49	(Spain) Axel Pons	Kalex	29	+37.827	23	1
16	60	(Spain) Julián Simón	Kalex	29	+38.111	15	
17	95	(Australia) Anthony West	Speed Up	29	+39.972	25	
18	55	(Malaysia) Hafizh Syahrin	Kalex	29	+42.604	17	
19	18	(Spain) Nicolás Terol	Suter	29	+43.646	19	
20	22	(United Kingdom) Sam Lowes	Speed Up	29	+46.032	26	
21	30	(Japan) Takaaki Nakagami	Kalex	29	+48.475	28	
22	45	(Japan) Tetsuta Nagashima	TSR	29	+52.832	32	
23	97	(Spain) Román Ramos	Speed Up	29	+1:03.277	31	
24	70	(Switzerland) Robin Mulhauser	Suter	29	+1:03.434	33	
25	8	(United Kingdom) Gino Rea	Suter	29	+1:15.320	27	
26	10	(Thailand) Thitipong Warokorn	Kalex	28	+1 lap	34	
27	33	(Germany) Nina Prinz	Speed Up	28	+1 lap	35	
28	25	(Malaysia) Azlan Shah	Kalex	27	+2 laps	29	
Ret	15	(San Marino) Alex de Angelis	Suter	22	Accident	9	
Ret	11	(Germany) Sandro Cortese	Kalex	22	Retirement	21	
Ret	5	(France) Johann Zarco	Caterham Suter	14	Accident	7	
Ret	2	(United States) Josh Herrin	Caterham Suter	12	Retirement	30	
Ret	94	(Germany) Jonas Folger	Kalex	8	Retirement	20	
Ret	7	(Italy) Lorenzo Baldassarri	Suter	6	Accident	12	
Ret	81	(Spain) Jordi Torres	Suter	4	Accident	4	
OFFICIAL MOTO2 REPORT

=== Moto3 ===
Pos.	No.	Rider	Manufacturer	Laps	Time/Retired	Grid	Points
1	8	(Australia) Jack Miller	KTM	27	39:26.927	1	25
2	41	(South Africa) Brad Binder	Mahindra	27	+0.180	6	20
3	10	(France) Alexis Masbou	Honda	27	+1.119	2	16
4	12	(Spain) Álex Márquez	Honda	27	+1.180	3	13
5	52	(United Kingdom) Danny Kent	Husqvarna	27	+1.290	5	11
6	7	(Spain) Efrén Vázquez	Honda	27	+26.231	17	10
7	17	(United Kingdom) John McPhee	Honda	27	+26.336	27	9
8	32	(Spain) Isaac Viñales	KTM	27	+26.474	16	8
9	3	(Italy) Matteo Ferrari	Mahindra	27	+26.583	14	7
10	58	(Spain) Juan Francisco Guevara	Kalex KTM	27	+26.735	9	6
11	84	(Czech Republic) Jakub Kornfeil	KTM	27	+26.873	18	5
12	65	(Germany) Philipp Öttl	Kalex KTM	27	+27.009	11	4
13	61	(Australia) Arthur Sissis	Mahindra	27	+27.305	22	3
14	57	(Brazil) Eric Granado	KTM	27	+30.084	8	2
15	33	(Italy) Enea Bastianini	KTM	27	+45.125	10	1
16	19	(Italy) Alessandro Tonucci	Mahindra	27	+45.539	15	
17	95	(France) Jules Danilo	Mahindra	27	+46.025	30	
18	38	(Malaysia) Hafiq Azmi	KTM	27	+46.110	23	
19	43	(Germany) Luca Grünwald	Kalex KTM	27	+56.787	21	
20	22	(Spain) Ana Carrasco	Kalex KTM	27	+57.149	31	
21	97	(Germany) Maximilian Kappler	FTR	27	+1:09.312	29	
22	91	(Argentina) Gabriel Rodrigo	Husqvarna	26	+1 lap	26	
23	86	(Germany) Kevin Hanus	Honda	26	+1 lap	33	
Ret	23	(Italy) Niccolò Antonelli	KTM	24	Accident	12	
Ret	44	(Portugal) Miguel Oliveira	Mahindra	19	Accident	19	
Ret	98	(Czech Republic) Karel Hanika	KTM	19	Accident	4	
Ret	55	(Italy) Andrea Locatelli	Mahindra	15	Accident	20	
Ret	11	(Belgium) Livio Loi	KTM	13	Retirement	28	
Ret	4	(Venezuela) Gabriel Ramos	Kalex KTM	12	Accident	34	
Ret	5	(Italy) Romano Fenati	KTM	3	Accident	25	
Ret	63	(Malaysia) Zulfahmi Khairuddin	Honda	3	Accident	13	
Ret	9	(Netherlands) Scott Deroue	Kalex KTM	1	Accident	32	
Ret	51	(Netherlands) Bryan Schouten	Mahindra	1	Accident	24	
Ret	42	(Spain) Álex Rins	Honda	0	Accident	7	
DNS	21	(Italy) Francesco Bagnaia	KTM		Did not start		
OFFICIAL MOTO3 REPORT

== Championship standings after the race (MotoGP) ==
Below are the standings for the top five riders and constructors after round nine has concluded.

Riders' Championship standings

Pos.	Rider	Points
1	(Spain) Marc Márquez	225
2	(Spain) Dani Pedrosa	148
3	(Italy) Valentino Rossi	141
4	(Italy) Andrea Dovizioso	99
5	(Spain) Jorge Lorenzo	97

Constructors' Championship standings

Pos.	Constructor	Points
1	(Japan) Honda	225
2	(Japan) Yamaha	154
3	(Italy) Ducati	105
4	(Switzerland) Forward Yamaha	77
5	(United Kingdom) PBM	6

- Note: Only the top five positions are included for both sets of standings.

Previous race: 2014 Dutch TT	FIM Grand Prix World Championship; 2014 season	Next race: 2014 Indianapolis Grand Prix
Previous race: 2013 German Grand Prix	German motorcycle Grand Prix	Next race: 2015 German Grand Prix
