= 2014 Japanese motorcycle Grand Prix =

(Japan) 2014 Japanese Grand Prix
Race details
- Race 15 of 18 races in the 2014 Grand Prix motorcycle racing season
- Date: 12 October 2014
- Official name: Motul Grand Prix of Japan
- Location: Twin Ring Motegi
- Course: Permanent racing facility; 4.801 km (2.983 mi)

MotoGP
Pole position
Rider	(Italy) Andrea Dovizioso	Ducati
Time	1:44.502	
Fastest lap
Rider	(Spain) Jorge Lorenzo	Yamaha
Time	1:45.350 on lap 8	
Podium
First	(Spain) Jorge Lorenzo	Yamaha
Second	(Spain) Marc Márquez	Honda
Third	(Italy) Valentino Rossi	Yamaha

Moto2
Pole position
Rider	(Spain) Esteve Rabat	Kalex
Time	1:50.854	
Fastest lap
Rider	(Spain) Maverick Viñales	Kalex
Time	1:50.866 on lap 19	
Podium
First	(Switzerland) Thomas Lüthi	Suter
Second	(Spain) Maverick Viñales	Kalex
Third	(Spain) Esteve Rabat	Kalex

Moto3
Pole position
Rider	(United Kingdom) Danny Kent	Husqvarna
Time	1:56.555	
Fastest lap
Rider	(Spain) Álex Márquez	Honda
Time	1:57.112 on lap 4	
Podium
First	(Spain) Álex Márquez	Honda
Second	(Spain) Efrén Vázquez	Honda
Third	(South Africa) Brad Binder	Mahindra

The 2014 Japanese motorcycle Grand Prix was the fifteenth round of the 2014 Grand Prix motorcycle racing season. It was held at the Twin Ring Motegi in Motegi on 12 October 2014.

In the MotoGP class, Andrea Dovizioso took his first pole position since the 2010 Japanese Grand Prix. However, Jorge Lorenzo won his second successive race, but a second-place finish for Marc Márquez was good enough for his second consecutive premier class world championship, and his fourth world title in total. The podium placings were completed by Valentino Rossi, who finished in third place. In the supporting categories, Thomas Lüthi took his first victory since 2012 by winning the Moto2 race, while in the Moto3 race, Álex Márquez took advantage of a collision between Ajo Motorsport teammates Jack Miller and Danny Kent, to take his third victory of 2014.

== Classification ==
=== MotoGP ===
Pos.	No.	Rider	Team	Manufacturer	Laps	Time/Retired	Grid	Points
1	99	(Spain) Jorge Lorenzo	Movistar Yamaha MotoGP	Yamaha	24	42:21.259	5	25
2	93	(Spain) Marc Márquez	Repsol Honda Team	Honda	24	+1.638	4	20
3	46	(Italy) Valentino Rossi	Movistar Yamaha MotoGP	Yamaha	24	+2.602	2	16
4	26	(Spain) Dani Pedrosa	Repsol Honda Team	Honda	24	+3.157	3	13
5	4	(Italy) Andrea Dovizioso	Ducati Team	Ducati	24	+14.353	1	11
6	29	(Italy) Andrea Iannone	Pramac Racing	Ducati	24	+16.653	6	10
7	6	(Germany) Stefan Bradl	LCR Honda MotoGP	Honda	24	+19.531	9	9
8	44	(Spain) Pol Espargaró	Monster Yamaha Tech 3	Yamaha	24	+19.815	7	8
9	38	(United Kingdom) Bradley Smith	Monster Yamaha Tech 3	Yamaha	24	+23.575	10	7
10	19	(Spain) Álvaro Bautista	Go&Fun Honda Gresini	Honda	24	+35.687	12	6
11	41	(Spain) Aleix Espargaró	NGM Forward Racing	Forward Yamaha	24	+40.668	11	5
12	21	(Japan) Katsuyuki Nakasuga	Yamalube Racing Team with YSP	Yamaha	24	+51.027	17	4
13	7	(Japan) Hiroshi Aoyama	Drive M7 Aspar	Honda	24	+51.093	18	3
14	69	(United States) Nicky Hayden	Drive M7 Aspar	Honda	24	+55.792	14	2
15	8	(Spain) Héctor Barberá	Avintia Racing	Ducati	24	+59.089	16	1
16	45	(United Kingdom) Scott Redding	Go&Fun Honda Gresini	Honda	24	+59.508	15	
17	15	(San Marino) Alex de Angelis	NGM Forward Racing	Forward Yamaha	24	+1:16.547	20	
18	70	(United Kingdom) Michael Laverty	Paul Bird Motorsport	PBM	24	+1:28.021	22	
19	63	(France) Mike Di Meglio	Avintia Racing	Avintia	24	+1:29.470	23	
20	23	(Australia) Broc Parkes	Paul Bird Motorsport	PBM	24	+1:33.253	24	
Ret	68	(Colombia) Yonny Hernández	Energy T.I. Pramac Racing	Ducati	23	Accident	13	
Ret	17	(Czech Republic) Karel Abraham	Cardion AB Motoracing	Honda	14	Accident	19	
Ret	9	(Italy) Danilo Petrucci	Octo IodaRacing Team	ART	4	Retirement	21	
Ret	35	(United Kingdom) Cal Crutchlow	Ducati Team	Ducati	1	Accident	8	

=== Moto2 ===
Pos.	No.	Rider	Manufacturer	Laps	Time/Retired	Grid	Points
1	12	(Switzerland) Thomas Lüthi	Suter	23	42:50.219	2	25
2	40	(Spain) Maverick Viñales	Kalex	23	+1.209	4	20
3	53	(Spain) Esteve Rabat	Kalex	23	+3.631	1	16
4	5	(France) Johann Zarco	Caterham Suter	23	+7.797	3	13
5	36	(Finland) Mika Kallio	Kalex	23	+8.472	5	11
6	60	(Spain) Julián Simón	Kalex	23	+8.881	7	10
7	21	(Italy) Franco Morbidelli	Kalex	23	+11.203	8	9
8	55	(Malaysia) Hafizh Syahrin	Kalex	23	+17.509	17	8
9	88	(Spain) Ricard Cardús	Tech 3	23	+18.424	18	7
10	19	(Belgium) Xavier Siméon	Suter	23	+21.192	13	6
11	81	(Spain) Jordi Torres	Suter	23	+22.646	14	5
12	94	(Germany) Jonas Folger	Kalex	23	+23.303	15	4
13	30	(Japan) Takaaki Nakagami	Kalex	23	+26.077	6	3
14	8	(United Kingdom) Gino Rea	Suter	23	+26.708	23	2
15	39	(Spain) Luis Salom	Kalex	23	+28.921	25	1
16	96	(France) Louis Rossi	Kalex	23	+29.312	20	
17	7	(Italy) Lorenzo Baldassarri	Suter	23	+31.192	21	
18	77	(Switzerland) Dominique Aegerter	Suter	23	+33.956	16	
19	14	(Thailand) Ratthapark Wilairot	Caterham Suter	23	+41.606	22	
20	20	(France) Florian Marino	Kalex	23	+42.031	28	
21	4	(Switzerland) Randy Krummenacher	Suter	23	+42.133	30	
22	18	(Spain) Nicolás Terol	Suter	23	+44.568	26	
23	71	(Japan) Tomoyoshi Koyama	NTS	23	+45.571	27	
24	25	(Malaysia) Azlan Shah	Kalex	23	+51.944	33	
25	10	(Thailand) Thitipong Warokorn	Kalex	23	+52.398	32	
26	72	(Japan) Yuki Takahashi	Moriwaki	23	+53.160	24	
27	97	(Spain) Román Ramos	Speed Up	23	+58.088	36	
28	70	(Switzerland) Robin Mulhauser	Suter	23	+1:06.689	31	
29	23	(Germany) Marcel Schrötter	Tech 3	23	+1:15.937	10	
30	65	(Thailand) Chalermpol Polamai	Tech 3	23	+1:22.685	34	
Ret	49	(Spain) Axel Pons	Kalex	17	Accident	9	
Ret	95	(Australia) Anthony West	Speed Up	13	Retirement	29	
Ret	54	(Italy) Mattia Pasini	Kalex	11	Retirement	19	
Ret	11	(Germany) Sandro Cortese	Kalex	7	Accident	11	
Ret	22	(United Kingdom) Sam Lowes	Speed Up	3	Accident	12	
Ret	84	(Italy) Riccardo Russo	Suter	0	Accident	35	
OFFICIAL MOTO2 REPORT

=== Moto3 ===
Pos.	No.	Rider	Manufacturer	Laps	Time/Retired	Grid	Points
1	12	(Spain) Álex Márquez	Honda	20	39:26.830	7	25
2	7	(Spain) Efrén Vázquez	Honda	20	+0.357	14	20
3	41	(South Africa) Brad Binder	Mahindra	20	+0.484	8	16
4	17	(United Kingdom) John McPhee	Honda	20	+0.672	3	13
5	8	(Australia) Jack Miller	KTM	20	+1.161	5	11
6	52	(United Kingdom) Danny Kent	Husqvarna	20	+1.796	1	10
7	5	(Italy) Romano Fenati	KTM	20	+5.927	17	9
8	33	(Italy) Enea Bastianini	KTM	20	+6.025	15	8
9	23	(Italy) Niccolò Antonelli	KTM	20	+6.527	2	7
10	42	(Spain) Álex Rins	Honda	20	+6.686	9	6
11	32	(Spain) Isaac Viñales	KTM	20	+6.988	6	5
12	98	(Czech Republic) Karel Hanika	KTM	20	+18.713	23	4
13	21	(Italy) Francesco Bagnaia	KTM	20	+18.757	18	3
14	63	(Malaysia) Zulfahmi Khairuddin	Honda	20	+19.242	19	2
15	19	(Italy) Alessandro Tonucci	Mahindra	20	+19.664	12	1
16	57	(Brazil) Eric Granado	KTM	20	+24.788	21	
17	65	(Germany) Philipp Öttl	Kalex KTM	20	+40.080	33	
18	38	(Malaysia) Hafiq Azmi	KTM	20	+40.154	29	
19	95	(France) Jules Danilo	Mahindra	20	+40.888	27	
20	13	(Netherlands) Jasper Iwema	Mahindra	20	+41.011	28	
21	43	(Germany) Luca Grünwald	Kalex KTM	20	+1:00.736	25	
22	4	(Venezuela) Gabriel Ramos	Kalex KTM	20	+1:01.752	34	
23	55	(Italy) Andrea Locatelli	Mahindra	20	+1:10.995	32	
24	3	(Italy) Matteo Ferrari	Mahindra	19	+1 lap	24	
Ret	44	(Portugal) Miguel Oliveira	Mahindra	11	Accident	4	
Ret	58	(Spain) Juan Francisco Guevara	Kalex KTM	9	Accident	10	
Ret	84	(Czech Republic) Jakub Kornfeil	KTM	9	Accident	13	
Ret	99	(Spain) Jorge Navarro	Kalex KTM	9	Accident	16	
Ret	10	(France) Alexis Masbou	Honda	7	Retirement	20	
Ret	31	(Finland) Niklas Ajo	Husqvarna	0	Accident	11	
Ret	16	(Italy) Andrea Migno	Mahindra	0	Accident	22	
Ret	83	(Japan) Hikari Okubo	Honda	0	Accident	26	
Ret	9	(Netherlands) Scott Deroue	Kalex KTM	0	Accident	30	
Ret	81	(Japan) Sena Yamada	Honda	0	Accident	31	
OFFICIAL MOTO3 REPORT

== Championship standings after the race (MotoGP) ==
Below are the standings for the top five riders and constructors after round fifteen has concluded.

Riders' Championship standings

Pos.	Rider	Points
1	(Spain) Marc Márquez	312
2	(Italy) Valentino Rossi	230
3	(Spain) Dani Pedrosa	230
4	(Spain) Jorge Lorenzo	227
5	(Italy) Andrea Dovizioso	153

Constructors' Championship standings

Pos.	Constructor	Points
1	(Japan) Honda	349
2	(Japan) Yamaha	289
3	(Italy) Ducati	176
4	(Switzerland) Forward Yamaha	122
5	(Italy) ART	9

- Note: Only the top five positions are included for both sets of standings.

Previous race: 2014 Aragon Grand Prix	FIM Grand Prix World Championship; 2014 season	Next race: 2014 Australian Grand Prix
Previous race: 2013 Japanese Grand Prix	Japanese motorcycle Grand Prix	Next race: 2015 Japanese Grand Prix
