= 2014 Australian motorcycle Grand Prix =

(Australia) 2014 Australian Grand Prix
Race details
- Race 16 of 18 races in the 2014 Grand Prix motorcycle racing season
- Date: 19 October 2014
- Official name: Tissot Australian Motorcycle Grand Prix
- Location: Phillip Island Grand Prix Circuit
- Course: Permanent racing facility; 4.448 km (2.764 mi)

MotoGP
Pole position
Rider	(Spain) Marc Márquez	Honda
Time	1:28.408	
Fastest lap
Rider	(Italy) Valentino Rossi	Yamaha
Time	1:29.605 on lap 9	
Podium
First	(Italy) Valentino Rossi	Yamaha
Second	(Spain) Jorge Lorenzo	Yamaha
Third	(United Kingdom) Bradley Smith	Yamaha

Moto2
Pole position
Rider	(Spain) Esteve Rabat	Kalex
Time	1:32.470	
Fastest lap
Rider	(Spain) Maverick Viñales	Kalex
Time	1:33.066 on lap 25	
Podium
First	(Spain) Maverick Viñales	Kalex
Second	(Switzerland) Thomas Lüthi	Suter
Third	(Spain) Esteve Rabat	Kalex

Moto3
Pole position
Rider	(Spain) Álex Márquez	Honda
Time	1:36.050	
Fastest lap
Rider	(Australia) Jack Miller	KTM
Time	1:36.302 on lap 3	
Podium
First	(Australia) Jack Miller	KTM
Second	(Spain) Álex Márquez	Honda
Third	(Spain) Álex Rins	Honda

The 2014 Australian motorcycle Grand Prix was the sixteenth round of the 2014 Grand Prix motorcycle racing season. It was held at the Phillip Island Grand Prix Circuit in Phillip Island on 19 October 2014.

In his 250th premier class start, Valentino Rossi took his second victory of the season, after benefitting from an accident for Marc Márquez, while he was leading the race. It was Rossi's sixth win at the circuit, after five successive wins from 2001 to 2005. Second place went to Rossi's teammate Jorge Lorenzo, while Tech 3's Bradley Smith finished in third place, recording his first premier class podium, after Ducati's Cal Crutchlow crashed out late on. As a result, it was the first all-Yamaha podium since the 2008 French Grand Prix and the first time since the 2011 Australian Grand Prix where all three riders on the podium were of the same manufacturer. For the first time since the 2009 Dutch TT, both Repsol Honda riders failed to finish the race; further to Márquez's accident, Dani Pedrosa collided with Andrea Iannone, causing both riders to retire from the race. Karel Abraham, Stefan Bradl and Pol Espargaró also crashed out of the race, and only 14 of the 23 starters reached the finish.

In the support categories, Maverick Viñales took his third win of the season in Moto2, ahead of Thomas Lüthi and championship leader Esteve Rabat. In Moto3, Jack Miller took his fifth win of the season on home soil, in a photo finish; he finished just clear of Estrella Galicia 0,0 teammates Álex Márquez (the championship leader) and Álex Rins. The top six riders were covered by just under a quarter of a second at the finish.

== Classification ==
=== MotoGP ===
Pos.	No.	Rider	Team	Manufacturer	Laps	Time/Retired	Grid	Points
1	46	(Italy) Valentino Rossi	Movistar Yamaha MotoGP	Yamaha	27	40:46.405	8	25
2	99	(Spain) Jorge Lorenzo	Movistar Yamaha MotoGP	Yamaha	27	+10.836	3	20
3	38	(United Kingdom) Bradley Smith	Monster Yamaha Tech 3	Yamaha	27	+12.294	4	16
4	4	(Italy) Andrea Dovizioso	Ducati Team	Ducati	27	+14.893	10	13
5	8	(Spain) Héctor Barberá	Avintia Racing	Ducati	27	+30.089	14	11
6	19	(Spain) Álvaro Bautista	Go&Fun Honda Gresini	Honda	27	+30.154	17	10
7	45	(United Kingdom) Scott Redding	Go&Fun Honda Gresini	Honda	27	+30.158	13	9
8	7	(Japan) Hiroshi Aoyama	Drive M7 Aspar	Honda	27	+33.166	12	8
9	15	(San Marino) Alex de Angelis	NGM Forward Racing	Forward Yamaha	27	+33.577	23	7
10	69	(United States) Nicky Hayden	Drive M7 Aspar	Honda	27	+34.144	15	6
11	68	(Colombia) Yonny Hernández	Energy T.I. Pramac Racing	Ducati	27	+39.468	18	5
12	9	(Italy) Danilo Petrucci	Octo IodaRacing Team	ART	27	+56.684	19	4
13	70	(United Kingdom) Michael Laverty	Paul Bird Motorsport	PBM	27	+1:12.813	21	3
14	63	(France) Mike Di Meglio	Avintia Racing	Avintia	27	+1:28.050	20	2
Ret	35	(United Kingdom) Cal Crutchlow	Ducati Team	Ducati	26	Accident	2	
Ret	44	(Spain) Pol Espargaró	Monster Yamaha Tech 3	Yamaha	24	Accident	9	
Ret	41	(Spain) Aleix Espargaró	NGM Forward Racing	Forward Yamaha	20	Retirement	6	
Ret	6	(Germany) Stefan Bradl	LCR Honda MotoGP	Honda	19	Accident	11	
Ret	93	(Spain) Marc Márquez	Repsol Honda Team	Honda	17	Accident	1	
Ret	23	(Australia) Broc Parkes	Paul Bird Motorsport	PBM	13	Retirement	22	
Ret	26	(Spain) Dani Pedrosa	Repsol Honda Team	Honda	6	Retirement	5	
Ret	29	(Italy) Andrea Iannone	Pramac Racing	Ducati	5	Accident	7	
Ret	17	(Czech Republic) Karel Abraham	Cardion AB Motoracing	Honda	4	Accident	16	

=== Moto2 ===
Pos.	No.	Rider	Manufacturer	Laps	Time/Retired	Grid	Points
1	40	(Spain) Maverick Viñales	Kalex	25	39:10.419	4	25
2	12	(Switzerland) Thomas Lüthi	Suter	25	+1.329	5	20
3	53	(Spain) Esteve Rabat	Kalex	25	+1.504	1	16
4	36	(Finland) Mika Kallio	Kalex	25	+1.843	3	13
5	22	(United Kingdom) Sam Lowes	Speed Up	25	+3.292	7	11
6	11	(Germany) Sandro Cortese	Kalex	25	+11.697	6	10
7	23	(Germany) Marcel Schrötter	Tech 3	25	+11.777	10	9
8	77	(Switzerland) Dominique Aegerter	Suter	25	+18.276	16	8
9	19	(Belgium) Xavier Siméon	Suter	25	+18.282	9	7
10	81	(Spain) Jordi Torres	Suter	25	+18.478	8	6
11	30	(Japan) Takaaki Nakagami	Kalex	25	+18.514	19	5
12	96	(France) Louis Rossi	Kalex	25	+18.560	20	4
13	21	(Italy) Franco Morbidelli	Kalex	25	+18.834	12	3
14	7	(Italy) Lorenzo Baldassarri	Suter	25	+19.224	18	2
15	94	(Germany) Jonas Folger	Kalex	25	+19.437	14	1
16	88	(Spain) Ricard Cardús	Tech 3	25	+33.238	11	
17	39	(Spain) Luis Salom	Kalex	25	+33.776	22	
18	18	(Spain) Nicolás Terol	Suter	25	+36.416	23	
19	4	(Switzerland) Randy Krummenacher	Suter	25	+40.574	15	
20	60	(Spain) Julián Simón	Kalex	25	+40.630	26	
21	8	(United Kingdom) Gino Rea	Suter	25	+51.225	27	
22	95	(Australia) Anthony West	Speed Up	25	+51.281	25	
23	97	(Spain) Román Ramos	Speed Up	25	+51.448	31	
24	71	(Japan) Tomoyoshi Koyama	NTS	25	+51.496	29	
25	20	(France) Florian Marino	Kalex	25	+55.266	24	
26	41	(Australia) Aiden Wagner	Kalex	25	+1:02.283	30	
27	42	(Australia) Max Croker	Suter	24	+1 lap	32	
Ret	54	(Italy) Mattia Pasini	Kalex	18	Retirement	13	
Ret	5	(France) Johann Zarco	Caterham Suter	17	Accident	2	
Ret	55	(Malaysia) Hafizh Syahrin	Kalex	15	Retirement	17	
Ret	14	(Thailand) Ratthapark Wilairot	Caterham Suter	12	Accident	21	
Ret	10	(Thailand) Thitipong Warokorn	Kalex	4	Accident	28	
DNS	49	(Spain) Axel Pons	Kalex		Did not start		
DNS	70	(Switzerland) Robin Mulhauser	Suter		Did not start		
DNS	25	(Malaysia) Azlan Shah	Kalex		Did not start		
OFFICIAL MOTO2 REPORT

=== Moto3 ===
Pos.	No.	Rider	Manufacturer	Laps	Time/Retired	Grid	Points
1	8	(Australia) Jack Miller	KTM	23	37:25.209	8	25
2	12	(Spain) Álex Márquez	Honda	23	+0.029	1	20
3	42	(Spain) Álex Rins	Honda	23	+0.032	2	16
4	7	(Spain) Efrén Vázquez	Honda	23	+0.044	6	13
5	17	(United Kingdom) John McPhee	Honda	23	+0.134	5	11
6	10	(France) Alexis Masbou	Honda	23	+0.242	9	10
7	44	(Portugal) Miguel Oliveira	Mahindra	23	+2.753	15	9
8	84	(Czech Republic) Jakub Kornfeil	KTM	23	+3.455	17	8
9	31	(Finland) Niklas Ajo	Husqvarna	23	+18.118	19	7
10	23	(Italy) Niccolò Antonelli	KTM	23	+18.119	13	6
11	21	(Italy) Francesco Bagnaia	KTM	23	+18.204	27	5
12	99	(Spain) Jorge Navarro	Kalex KTM	23	+18.226	11	4
13	98	(Czech Republic) Karel Hanika	KTM	23	+18.278	18	3
14	19	(Italy) Alessandro Tonucci	Mahindra	23	+18.544	16	2
15	41	(South Africa) Brad Binder	Mahindra	23	+20.468	12	1
16	13	(Netherlands) Jasper Iwema	Mahindra	23	+23.434	7	
17	16	(Italy) Andrea Migno	Mahindra	23	+25.892	26	
18	38	(Malaysia) Hafiq Azmi	KTM	23	+25.894	22	
19	43	(Germany) Luca Grünwald	Kalex KTM	23	+35.571	21	
20	52	(United Kingdom) Danny Kent	Husqvarna	23	+36.602	4	
21	65	(Germany) Philipp Öttl	Kalex KTM	23	+40.291	29	
22	95	(France) Jules Danilo	Mahindra	23	+40.312	31	
23	9	(Netherlands) Scott Deroue	Kalex KTM	23	+40.514	28	
24	3	(Italy) Matteo Ferrari	Mahindra	23	+52.031	30	
25	58	(Spain) Juan Francisco Guevara	Kalex KTM	23	+56.233	3	
26	2	(Australia) Remy Gardner	KTM	23	+56.274	24	
27	4	(Venezuela) Gabriel Ramos	Kalex KTM	23	+57.002	33	
28	45	(Australia) Olly Simpson	KTM	23	+57.340	32	
Ret	5	(Italy) Romano Fenati	KTM	21	Accident	10	
Ret	32	(Spain) Isaac Viñales	KTM	16	Retirement	14	
Ret	33	(Italy) Enea Bastianini	KTM	12	Retirement	20	
Ret	55	(Italy) Andrea Locatelli	Mahindra	1	Accident	23	
Ret	63	(Malaysia) Zulfahmi Khairuddin	Honda	1	Accident	25	
DNS	57	(Brazil) Eric Granado	KTM		Did not start		
OFFICIAL MOTO3 REPORT

== Championship standings after the race (MotoGP) ==
Below are the standings for the top five riders and constructors after round sixteen has concluded.

Riders' Championship standings

Pos.	Rider	Points
1	(Spain) Marc Márquez	312
2	(Italy) Valentino Rossi	255
3	(Spain) Jorge Lorenzo	247
4	(Spain) Dani Pedrosa	230
5	(Italy) Andrea Dovizioso	166

Constructors' Championship standings

Pos.	Constructor	Points
1	(Japan) Honda	359
2	(Japan) Yamaha	314
3	(Italy) Ducati	189
4	(Switzerland) Forward Yamaha	129
5	(Italy) ART	13

- Note: Only the top five positions are included for both sets of standings.

Previous race: 2014 Japanese Grand Prix	FIM Grand Prix World Championship; 2014 season	Next race: 2014 Malaysian Grand Prix
Previous race: 2013 Australian Grand Prix	Australian motorcycle Grand Prix	Next race: 2015 Australian Grand Prix
