= 2014 Valencian Community motorcycle Grand Prix =

2014 Valencian Community Grand Prix
Race details
- Race 18 of 18 races in the 2014 Grand Prix motorcycle racing season
- Date: 9 November 2014
- Official name: Gran Premio Generali de la Comunitat Valenciana
- Location: Circuit Ricardo Tormo
- Course: Permanent racing facility; 4.005 km (2.489 mi)

MotoGP
Pole position
Rider	(Italy) Valentino Rossi	Yamaha
Time	1:30.843	
Fastest lap
Rider	(Spain) Marc Márquez	Honda
Time	1:31.515 on lap 8	
Podium
First	(Spain) Marc Márquez	Honda
Second	(Italy) Valentino Rossi	Yamaha
Third	(Spain) Dani Pedrosa	Honda

Moto2
Pole position
Rider	(Spain) Esteve Rabat	Kalex
Time	1:35.199	
Fastest lap
Rider	(Switzerland) Thomas Lüthi	Suter
Time	1:35.312 on lap 18	
Podium
First	(Switzerland) Thomas Lüthi	Suter
Second	(Spain) Esteve Rabat	Kalex
Third	(France) Johann Zarco	Caterham Suter

Moto3
Pole position
Rider	(Italy) Niccolò Antonelli	KTM
Time	1:39.183	
Fastest lap
Rider	(Spain) Efrén Vázquez	Honda
Time	1:39.400 on lap 7	
Podium
First	(Australia) Jack Miller	KTM
Second	(Spain) Isaac Viñales	KTM
Third	(Spain) Álex Márquez	Honda

The 2014 Valencian Community motorcycle Grand Prix was the eighteenth and last round of the 2014 Grand Prix motorcycle racing season. It was held at the Circuit Ricardo Tormo in Valencia on 9 November 2014.

In the MotoGP class, Valentino Rossi took his first pole position since the 2010 French Grand Prix. However, it was Marc Márquez who won the race, taking his thirteenth victory of the season, surpassing the previous premier class record of twelve wins set by Mick Doohan in 1997. Rossi crossed the line in second place to take the runner-up spot in the championship, while the podium was completed by Dani Pedrosa. Further down the order, Jorge Lorenzo and Andrea Iannone decided to swap bikes – on lap 20 – as light rain fell. Both riders struggled to get the bike stopped in the uncertain conditions and dropped down the order; Iannone finished 22nd, while Lorenzo retired from the race. The Suzuki MotoGP team returned to the series in a wildcard appearance, ahead of a full-season entry in 2015. Utilising the new Suzuki GSX-RR, Randy de Puniet retired from the race before the halfway mark. Drive M7 Aspar rider, Hiroshi Aoyama, rode an Open-specification Honda RC213V-RS and finished in fifteenth place. The race was also the Gresini team's last race with Honda bikes ahead of their switch to Aprilia in 2015. It was also the final race for the PBM chassis, as their team will switch to the British Superbike Championship from 2015.

In the Moto2 race, Thomas Lüthi took his second victory of the season, after capitalising on a mistake by the world champion, Esteve Rabat, on the final lap to take the spoils. Rabat had been leading the race before missing a gear coming out of the final corner, and Lüthi was able to prevail by 0.133 seconds at the line. Rabat's second place did however, seal a record number of points scored for an intermediate class season. Johann Zarco completed the podium in third place, his fourth podium of the season. Aside from the race honours, the runner-up position in the final championship standings was decided by virtue of a collision between the two competitors battling for the position. Rabat's teammate Mika Kallio and Maverick Viñales both retired from the race, thus giving Kallio the position by 15 points.

The world title was decided in the final Moto3 race of the season, with a third-place finish for Álex Márquez enough to give him his first world title by two points, despite his title rival Jack Miller winning the race. In the process, he and his brother Marc Márquez became the first brothers to win world motorcycle racing titles. Splitting the title rivals in the finishing order was Isaac Viñales, taking his third podium of the season.

== Classification ==
=== MotoGP ===
Pos.	No.	Rider	Team	Manufacturer	Laps	Time/Retired	Grid	Points
1	93	(Spain) Marc Márquez	Repsol Honda Team	Honda	30	46:39.627	5	25
2	46	(Italy) Valentino Rossi	Movistar Yamaha MotoGP	Yamaha	30	+3.516	1	20
3	26	(Spain) Dani Pedrosa	Repsol Honda Team	Honda	30	+14.040	3	16
4	4	(Italy) Andrea Dovizioso	Ducati Team	Ducati	30	+16.705	9	13
5	35	(United Kingdom) Cal Crutchlow	Ducati Team	Ducati	30	+16.773	8	11
6	44	(Spain) Pol Espargaró	Monster Yamaha Tech 3	Yamaha	30	+37.884	6	10
7	41	(Spain) Aleix Espargaró	NGM Forward Racing	Forward Yamaha	30	+38.168	11	9
8	6	(Germany) Stefan Bradl	LCR Honda MotoGP	Honda	30	+41.803	10	8
9	51	(Italy) Michele Pirro	Ducati Team	Ducati	30	+45.710	12	7
10	45	(United Kingdom) Scott Redding	Go&Fun Honda Gresini	Honda	30	+51.191	14	6
11	8	(Spain) Héctor Barberá	Avintia Racing	Ducati	30	+56.512	17	5
12	9	(Italy) Danilo Petrucci	Octo IodaRacing Team	ART	30	+57.000	21	4
13	69	(United States) Nicky Hayden	Drive M7 Aspar	Honda	30	+57.262	16	3
14	38	(United Kingdom) Bradley Smith	Monster Yamaha Tech 3	Yamaha	30	+57.517	7	2
15	7	(Japan) Hiroshi Aoyama	Drive M7 Aspar	Honda	30	+58.775	18	1
16	19	(Spain) Álvaro Bautista	Go&Fun Honda Gresini	Honda	30	+58.864	13	
17	17	(Czech Republic) Karel Abraham	Cardion AB Motoracing	Honda	30	+1:02.389	23	
18	15	(San Marino) Alex de Angelis	NGM Forward Racing	Forward Yamaha	30	+1:15.795	19	
19	70	(United Kingdom) Michael Laverty	Paul Bird Motorsport	PBM	30	+1:26.309	22	
20	23	(Australia) Broc Parkes	Paul Bird Motorsport	PBM	30	+1:37.212	24	
21	63	(France) Mike Di Meglio	Avintia Racing	Avintia	29	+1 lap	25	
22	29	(Italy) Andrea Iannone	Pramac Racing	Ducati	29	+1 lap	2	
Ret	99	(Spain) Jorge Lorenzo	Movistar Yamaha MotoGP	Yamaha	24	Retirement	4	
Ret	14	(France) Randy de Puniet	Team Suzuki MotoGP	Suzuki	12	Retirement	20	
Ret	68	(Colombia) Yonny Hernández	Energy T.I. Pramac Racing	Ducati	9	Retirement	15	

=== Moto2 ===
Pos.	No.	Rider	Manufacturer	Laps	Time/Retired	Grid	Points
1	12	(Switzerland) Thomas Lüthi	Suter	27	43:08.366	4	25
2	53	(Spain) Esteve Rabat	Kalex	27	+0.133	1	20
3	5	(France) Johann Zarco	Caterham Suter	27	+10.728	2	16
4	39	(Spain) Luis Salom	Kalex	27	+13.014	10	13
5	19	(Belgium) Xavier Siméon	Suter	27	+13.689	5	11
6	77	(Switzerland) Dominique Aegerter	Suter	27	+14.706	11	10
7	22	(United Kingdom) Sam Lowes	Speed Up	27	+18.825	14	9
8	23	(Germany) Marcel Schrötter	Tech 3	27	+30.185	6	8
9	95	(Australia) Anthony West	Speed Up	27	+30.227	23	7
10	7	(Italy) Lorenzo Baldassarri	Suter	27	+30.604	17	6
11	81	(Spain) Jordi Torres	Suter	27	+30.615	25	5
12	88	(Spain) Ricard Cardús	Tech 3	27	+33.422	20	4
13	94	(Germany) Jonas Folger	Kalex	27	+33.594	7	3
14	30	(Japan) Takaaki Nakagami	Kalex	27	+33.997	22	2
15	96	(France) Louis Rossi	Kalex	27	+34.007	15	1
16	55	(Malaysia) Hafizh Syahrin	Kalex	27	+35.578	19	
17	70	(Switzerland) Robin Mulhauser	Suter	27	+35.691	26	
18	18	(Spain) Nicolás Terol	Suter	27	+46.996	29	
19	14	(Thailand) Ratthapark Wilairot	Caterham Suter	27	+50.650	28	
20	44	(Italy) Roberto Rolfo	Suter	27	+51.877	30	
21	21	(Italy) Franco Morbidelli	Kalex	27	+52.808	3	
22	4	(Switzerland) Randy Krummenacher	Suter	27	+53.428	21	
23	20	(France) Florian Marino	Kalex	27	+53.435	27	
24	8	(United Kingdom) Gino Rea	Suter	27	+1:07.704	32	
25	97	(Spain) Román Ramos	Speed Up	27	+1:13.613	33	
26	45	(Japan) Tetsuta Nagashima	NTS	27	+1:14.977	35	
27	25	(Malaysia) Azlan Shah	Kalex	27	+1:15.138	34	
28	10	(Thailand) Thitipong Warokorn	Kalex	25	+2 laps	31	
Ret	54	(Italy) Mattia Pasini	Kalex	7	Retirement	18	
Ret	90	(France) Lucas Mahias	TransFIORmers	4	Accident	24	
Ret	60	(Spain) Julián Simón	Kalex	2	Accident	12	
Ret	49	(Spain) Axel Pons	Kalex	2	Accident	13	
Ret	40	(Spain) Maverick Viñales	Kalex	2	Retirement	8	
Ret	36	(Finland) Mika Kallio	Kalex	0	Accident	9	
Ret	11	(Germany) Sandro Cortese	Kalex	0	Accident	16	
OFFICIAL MOTO2 REPORT

=== Moto3 ===
Pos.	No.	Rider	Manufacturer	Laps	Time/Retired	Grid	Points
1	8	(Australia) Jack Miller	KTM	24	40:10.983	2	25
2	32	(Spain) Isaac Viñales	KTM	24	+0.155	4	20
3	12	(Spain) Álex Márquez	Honda	24	+0.955	3	16
4	52	(United Kingdom) Danny Kent	Husqvarna	24	+1.572	11	13
5	42	(Spain) Álex Rins	Honda	24	+2.251	5	11
6	7	(Spain) Efrén Vázquez	Honda	24	+2.508	9	10
7	23	(Italy) Niccolò Antonelli	KTM	24	+3.620	1	9
8	44	(Portugal) Miguel Oliveira	Mahindra	24	+4.216	17	8
9	41	(South Africa) Brad Binder	Mahindra	24	+4.248	16	7
10	98	(Czech Republic) Karel Hanika	KTM	24	+4.363	6	6
11	33	(Italy) Enea Bastianini	KTM	24	+5.462	21	5
12	10	(France) Alexis Masbou	Honda	24	+5.780	15	4
13	84	(Czech Republic) Jakub Kornfeil	KTM	24	+5.959	12	3
14	5	(Italy) Romano Fenati	KTM	24	+6.209	14	2
15	58	(Spain) Juan Francisco Guevara	Kalex KTM	24	+6.726	10	1
16	21	(Italy) Francesco Bagnaia	KTM	24	+11.775	20	
17	17	(United Kingdom) John McPhee	Honda	24	+16.663	8	
18	16	(Italy) Andrea Migno	Mahindra	24	+24.919	13	
19	63	(Malaysia) Zulfahmi Khairuddin	Honda	24	+28.038	26	
20	13	(Netherlands) Jasper Iwema	Mahindra	24	+28.404	23	
21	19	(Italy) Alessandro Tonucci	Mahindra	24	+28.490	19	
22	43	(Germany) Luca Grünwald	Kalex KTM	24	+40.773	28	
23	38	(Malaysia) Hafiq Azmi	KTM	24	+40.784	24	
24	4	(Venezuela) Gabriel Ramos	Kalex KTM	24	+49.329	34	
25	3	(Italy) Matteo Ferrari	Mahindra	24	+49.355	27	
26	55	(Italy) Andrea Locatelli	Mahindra	24	+52.862	30	
27	6	(Spain) María Herrera	Honda	24	+52.879	31	
28	14	(Spain) Albert Arenas	KTM	24	+1:29.792	22	
Ret	31	(Finland) Niklas Ajo	Husqvarna	20	Accident	7	
Ret	99	(Spain) Jorge Navarro	Kalex KTM	9	Accident	18	
Ret	9	(Netherlands) Scott Deroue	Kalex KTM	8	Retirement	33	
Ret	95	(France) Jules Danilo	Mahindra	7	Accident	29	
Ret	91	(Argentina) Gabriel Rodrigo	KTM	1	Accident	25	
Ret	65	(Germany) Philipp Öttl	Kalex KTM	1	Accident	32	
OFFICIAL MOTO3 REPORT

== Championship standings after the race (MotoGP) ==
Below are the standings for the top five riders and constructors after round eighteen has concluded.

Riders' Championship standings

Pos.	Rider	Points
1	(Spain) Marc Márquez	362
2	(Italy) Valentino Rossi	295
3	(Spain) Jorge Lorenzo	263
4	(Spain) Dani Pedrosa	246
5	(Italy) Andrea Dovizioso	187

Constructors' Championship standings

Pos.	Constructor	Points
1	(Japan) Honda	409
2	(Japan) Yamaha	354
3	(Italy) Ducati	211
4	(Switzerland) Forward Yamaha	138
5	(Italy) ART	17

- Note: Only the top five positions are included for both sets of standings.

Previous race: 2014 Malaysian Grand Prix	FIM Grand Prix World Championship; 2014 season	Next race: 2015 Qatar Grand Prix
Previous race: 2013 Valencian Grand Prix	Valencian Community motorcycle Grand Prix	Next race: 2015 Valencian Grand Prix
