= 2014 Dutch TT =

(Netherlands) 2014 Dutch Grand Prix
Race details
- Race 8 of 18 races in the 2014 Grand Prix motorcycle racing season
- Date: 28 June 2014
- Official name: Iveco Daily TT Assen
- Location: TT Circuit Assen
- Course: Permanent racing facility; 4.542 km (2.822 mi)

MotoGP
Pole position
| Rider | (Spain) Aleix Espargaró | Forward Yamaha |
| Time | 1:38.789 | |
Fastest lap
| Rider | (Spain) Marc Márquez | Honda |
| Time | 1:34.575 on lap 19 | |
Podium
| First | (Spain) Marc Márquez | Honda |
| Second | (Italy) Andrea Dovizioso | Ducati |
| Third | (Spain) Dani Pedrosa | Honda |

Moto2
Pole position
| Rider | (Spain) Esteve Rabat | Kalex |
| Time | 1:37.311 | |
Fastest lap
| Rider | (Switzerland) Dominique Aegerter | Suter |
| Time | 1:43.463 on lap 23 | |
Podium
| First | (Australia) Anthony West | Speed Up |
| Second | (Spain) Maverick Viñales | Kalex |
| Third | (Finland) Mika Kallio | Kalex |

Moto3
Pole position
| Rider | (Australia) Jack Miller | KTM |
| Time | 1:42.240 | |
Fastest lap
| Rider | (Italy) Romano Fenati | KTM |
| Time | 1:42.914 on lap 12 | |
Podium
| First | (Spain) Álex Márquez | Honda |
| Second | (Spain) Álex Rins | Honda |
| Third | (Portugal) Miguel Oliveira | Mahindra |

The 2014 Dutch TT was the eighth round of the 2014 MotoGP season. It was held at the TT Circuit Assen in Assen on 28 June 2014.

In his 150th Grand Prix, Aleix Espargaró recorded his first-ever pole position through his career. However, Marc Márquez won his eight successive race. The second place was finished by Andrea Dovizioso and the podium was cleared by Dani Pedrosa, finished in third place.

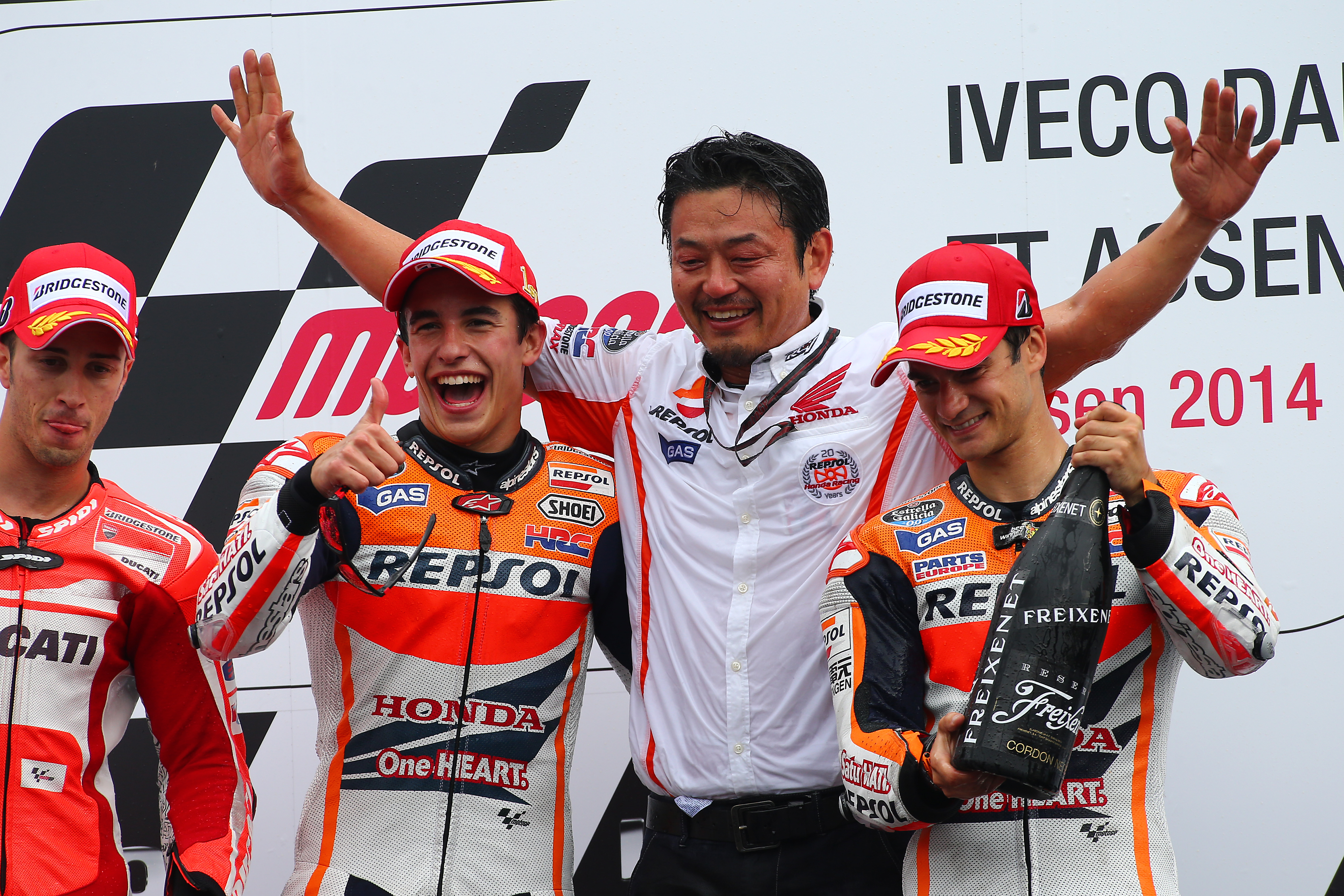
Andrea Dovizioso, Marc Márquez and Dani Pedrosa, celebrating on the podium after finishing second, first and third at the MotoGP race.

== Classification ==
=== MotoGP ===
| Pos. | No. | Rider | Team | Manufacturer | Laps | Time/Retired | Grid | Points |
|---|---|---|---|---|---|---|---|---|
| 1 | 93 | (Spain) Marc Márquez | Repsol Honda Team | Honda | 26 | 43:29.954 | 2 | 25 |
| 2 | 4 | (Italy) Andrea Dovizioso | Ducati Team | Ducati | 26 | +6.714 | 7 | 20 |
| 3 | 26 | (Spain) Dani Pedrosa | Repsol Honda Team | Honda | 26 | +10.791 | 3 | 16 |
| 4 | 41 | (Spain) Aleix Espargaró | NGM Forward Racing | Forward Yamaha | 26 | +19.199 | 1 | 13 |
| 5 | 46 | (Italy) Valentino Rossi | Movistar Yamaha MotoGP | Yamaha | 26 | +25.813 | 12 | 11 |
| 6 | 29 | (Italy) Andrea Iannone | Pramac Racing | Ducati | 26 | +29.003 | 4 | 10 |
| 7 | 19 | (Spain) Álvaro Bautista | Go&Fun Honda Gresini | Honda | 26 | +30.882 | 10 | 9 |
| 8 | 38 | (United Kingdom) Bradley Smith | Monster Yamaha Tech 3 | Yamaha | 26 | +30.985 | 6 | 8 |
| 9 | 35 | (United Kingdom) Cal Crutchlow | Ducati Team | Ducati | 26 | +44.031 | 5 | 7 |
| 10 | 6 | (Germany) Stefan Bradl | LCR Honda MotoGP | Honda | 26 | +48.662 | 8 | 6 |
| 11 | 23 | (Australia) Broc Parkes | Paul Bird Motorsport | PBM | 26 | +51.863 | 19 | 5 |
| 12 | 45 | (United Kingdom) Scott Redding | Go&Fun Honda Gresini | Honda | 26 | +1:00.329 | 16 | 4 |
| 13 | 99 | (Spain) Jorge Lorenzo | Movistar Yamaha MotoGP | Yamaha | 26 | +1:04.641 | 9 | 3 |
| 14 | 17 | (Czech Republic) Karel Abraham | Cardion AB Motoracing | Honda | 26 | +1:05.980 | 13 | 2 |
| 15 | 9 | (Italy) Danilo Petrucci | Octo IodaRacing Team | ART | 26 | +1:17.611 | 17 | 1 |
| 16 | 7 | (Japan) Hiroshi Aoyama | Drive M7 Aspar | Honda | 26 | +1:19.753 | 14 | |
| 17 | 69 | (United States) Nicky Hayden | Drive M7 Aspar | Honda | 26 | +1:27.630 | 22 | |
| 18 | 8 | (Spain) Héctor Barberá | Avintia Racing | Avintia | 26 | +1:28.142 | 20 | |
| 19 | 68 | (Colombia) Yonny Hernández | Energy T.I. Pramac Racing | Ducati | 25 | +1 lap | 15 | |
| 20 | 63 | (France) Mike Di Meglio | Avintia Racing | Avintia | 25 | +1 lap | 23 | |
| 21 | 70 | (United Kingdom) Michael Laverty | Paul Bird Motorsport | PBM | 25 | +1 lap | 21 | |
| 22 | 5 | (United States) Colin Edwards | NGM Forward Racing | Forward Yamaha | 23 | +3 laps | 18 | |
| Ret | 44 | (Spain) Pol Espargaró | Monster Yamaha Tech 3 | Yamaha | 18 | Retirement | 11 | |

=== Moto2 ===
| Pos. | No. | Rider | Manufacturer | Laps | Time/Retired | Grid | Points |
|---|---|---|---|---|---|---|---|
| 1 | 95 | (Australia) Anthony West | Speed Up | 24 | 46:02.089 | 23 | 25 |
| 2 | 40 | (Spain) Maverick Viñales | Kalex | 24 | +0.318 | 8 | 20 |
| 3 | 36 | (Finland) Mika Kallio | Kalex | 24 | +0.743 | 4 | 16 |
| 4 | 5 | (France) Johann Zarco | Caterham Suter | 24 | +7.300 | 7 | 13 |
| 5 | 15 | (San Marino) Alex de Angelis | Suter | 24 | +11.253 | 19 | 11 |
| 6 | 12 | (Switzerland) Thomas Lüthi | Suter | 24 | +14.932 | 17 | 10 |
| 7 | 60 | (Spain) Julián Simón | Kalex | 24 | +17.658 | 11 | 9 |
| 8 | 53 | (Spain) Esteve Rabat | Kalex | 24 | +20.177 | 1 | 8 |
| 9 | 7 | (Italy) Lorenzo Baldassarri | Suter | 24 | +25.260 | 25 | 7 |
| 10 | 55 | (Malaysia) Hafizh Syahrin | Kalex | 24 | +50.761 | 28 | 6 |
| 11 | 8 | (United Kingdom) Gino Rea | Suter | 24 | +51.526 | 33 | 5 |
| 12 | 23 | (Germany) Marcel Schrötter | Tech 3 | 24 | +51.692 | 16 | 4 |
| 13 | 3 | (Italy) Simone Corsi | Kalex | 24 | +57.108 | 6 | 3 |
| 14 | 30 | (Japan) Takaaki Nakagami | Kalex | 24 | +1:06.613 | 5 | 2 |
| 15 | 39 | (Spain) Luis Salom | Kalex | 24 | +1:15.500 | 15 | 1 |
| 16 | 88 | (Spain) Ricard Cardús | Tech 3 | 24 | +1:17.239 | 9 | |
| 17 | 54 | (Italy) Mattia Pasini | Kalex | 24 | +1:17.258 | 12 | |
| 18 | 2 | (United States) Josh Herrin | Caterham Suter | 24 | +1:42.178 | 27 | |
| 19 | 97 | (Spain) Román Ramos | Speed Up | 24 | +1:48.124 | 32 | |
| 20 | 45 | (Japan) Tetsuta Nagashima | TSR | 23 | +1 lap | 30 | |
| 21 | 77 | (Switzerland) Dominique Aegerter | Suter | 23 | +1 lap | 2 | |
| 22 | 18 | (Spain) Nicolás Terol | Suter | 23 | +1 lap | 24 | |
| 23 | 94 | (Germany) Jonas Folger | Kalex | 22 | +2 laps | 21 | |
| 24 | 21 | (Italy) Franco Morbidelli | Kalex | 22 | +2 laps | 13 | |
| 25 | 19 | (Belgium) Xavier Siméon | Suter | 22 | +2 laps | 10 | |
| 26 | 81 | (Spain) Jordi Torres | Suter | 22 | +2 laps | 20 | |
| 27 | 70 | (Switzerland) Robin Mulhauser | Suter | 22 | +2 laps | 31 | |
| 28 | 96 | (France) Louis Rossi | Kalex | 21 | +3 laps | 22 | |
| 29 | 10 | (Thailand) Thitipong Warokorn | Kalex | 20 | +4 laps | 34 | |
| Ret | 11 | (Germany) Sandro Cortese | Kalex | 18 | Accident | 14 | |
| Ret | 4 | (Switzerland) Randy Krummenacher | Suter | 12 | Retirement | 26 | |
| Ret | 22 | (United Kingdom) Sam Lowes | Speed Up | 8 | Accident | 3 | |
| Ret | 49 | (Spain) Axel Pons | Kalex | 7 | Accident | 18 | |
| Ret | 25 | (Malaysia) Azlan Shah | Kalex | 3 | Accident | 29 | |
OFFICIAL MOTO2 REPORT

=== Moto3 ===
| Pos. | No. | Rider | Manufacturer | Laps | Time/Retired | Grid | Points |
|---|---|---|---|---|---|---|---|
| 1 | 12 | (Spain) Álex Márquez | Honda | 22 | 38:07.648 | 2 | 25 |
| 2 | 42 | (Spain) Álex Rins | Honda | 22 | +2.960 | 6 | 20 |
| 3 | 44 | (Portugal) Miguel Oliveira | Mahindra | 22 | +3.644 | 13 | 16 |
| 4 | 10 | (France) Alexis Masbou | Honda | 22 | +16.350 | 4 | 13 |
| 5 | 23 | (Italy) Niccolò Antonelli | KTM | 22 | +16.466 | 5 | 11 |
| 6 | 7 | (Spain) Efrén Vázquez | Honda | 22 | +16.487 | 15 | 10 |
| 7 | 32 | (Spain) Isaac Viñales | KTM | 22 | +16.531 | 7 | 9 |
| 8 | 52 | (United Kingdom) Danny Kent | Husqvarna | 22 | +16.559 | 11 | 8 |
| 9 | 41 | (South Africa) Brad Binder | Mahindra | 22 | +16.643 | 16 | 7 |
| 10 | 17 | (United Kingdom) John McPhee | Honda | 22 | +16.686 | 10 | 6 |
| 11 | 84 | (Czech Republic) Jakub Kornfeil | KTM | 22 | +23.232 | 14 | 5 |
| 12 | 13 | (Netherlands) Jasper Iwema | FTR KTM | 22 | +24.824 | 17 | 4 |
| 13 | 3 | (Italy) Matteo Ferrari | Mahindra | 22 | +25.693 | 23 | 3 |
| 14 | 63 | (Malaysia) Zulfahmi Khairuddin | Honda | 22 | +25.710 | 26 | 2 |
| 15 | 65 | (Germany) Philipp Öttl | Kalex KTM | 22 | +25.774 | 24 | 1 |
| 16 | 51 | (Netherlands) Bryan Schouten | Mahindra | 22 | +25.921 | 28 | |
| 17 | 55 | (Italy) Andrea Locatelli | Mahindra | 22 | +26.310 | 21 | |
| 18 | 5 | (Italy) Romano Fenati | KTM | 22 | +29.338 | 9 | |
| 19 | 57 | (Brazil) Eric Granado | KTM | 22 | +32.585 | 25 | |
| 20 | 9 | (Netherlands) Scott Deroue | Kalex KTM | 22 | +38.766 | 20 | |
| 21 | 61 | (Australia) Arthur Sissis | Mahindra | 22 | +46.930 | 18 | |
| 22 | 95 | (France) Jules Danilo | Mahindra | 22 | +47.117 | 31 | |
| 23 | 71 | (Netherlands) Thomas van Leeuwen | Kalex KTM | 22 | +49.062 | 33 | |
| 24 | 22 | (Spain) Ana Carrasco | Kalex KTM | 22 | +52.269 | 32 | |
| 25 | 11 | (Belgium) Livio Loi | Kalex KTM | 22 | +52.359 | 29 | |
| 26 | 19 | (Italy) Alessandro Tonucci | Mahindra | 22 | +1:10.604 | 27 | |
| 27 | 4 | (Venezuela) Gabriel Ramos | Kalex KTM | 22 | +1:19.403 | 34 | |
| 28 | 43 | (Germany) Luca Grünwald | Kalex KTM | 22 | +1:48.719 | 30 | |
| 29 | 38 | (Malaysia) Hafiq Azmi | KTM | 21 | +1 lap | 22 | |
| Ret | 58 | (Spain) Juan Francisco Guevara | Kalex KTM | 21 | Accident | 19 | |
| Ret | 98 | (Czech Republic) Karel Hanika | KTM | 17 | Retirement | 8 | |
| Ret | 31 | (Finland) Niklas Ajo | Husqvarna | 6 | Accident | 3 | |
| Ret | 8 | (Australia) Jack Miller | KTM | 1 | Accident | 1 | |
| Ret | 33 | (Italy) Enea Bastianini | KTM | 0 | Accident | 12 | |
| DNS | 21 | (Italy) Francesco Bagnaia | KTM | | Did not start | | |
OFFICIAL MOTO3 REPORT

== Championship standings after the race (MotoGP) ==
Below are the standings for the top five riders and constructors after round eight has concluded.

Riders' Championship standings

| Pos. | Rider | Points |
|---|---|---|
| 1 | (Spain) Marc Márquez | 200 |
| 2 | (Italy) Valentino Rossi | 128 |
| 3 | (Spain) Dani Pedrosa | 128 |
| 4 | (Italy) Andrea Dovizioso | 91 |
| 5 | (Spain) Jorge Lorenzo | 81 |

Constructors' Championship standings

| Pos. | Constructor | Points |
|---|---|---|
| 1 | (Japan) Honda | 200 |
| 2 | (Japan) Yamaha | 138 |
| 3 | (Italy) Ducati | 94 |
| 4 | (Switzerland) Forward Yamaha | 67 |
| 5 | (United Kingdom) PBM | 6 |

- Note: Only the top five positions are included for both sets of standings.

| Previous race: 2014 Catalan Grand Prix | FIM Grand Prix World Championship; 2014 season | Next race: 2014 German Grand Prix |
| Previous race: 2013 Dutch TT | Dutch TT | Next race: 2015 Dutch TT |
