= 2014 Aragon motorcycle Grand Prix =

2014 Aragon Grand Prix
Race details
- Race 14 of 18 races in the 2014 Grand Prix motorcycle racing season
- Date: 28 September 2014
- Official name: Gran Premio Movistar de Aragón
- Location: MotorLand Aragón
- Course: Permanent racing facility; 5.078 km (3.155 mi)

MotoGP
Pole position
Rider	(Spain) Marc Márquez	Honda
Time	1:47.187	
Fastest lap
Rider	(Spain) Jorge Lorenzo	Yamaha
Time	1:49.107 on lap 5	
Podium
First	(Spain) Jorge Lorenzo	Yamaha
Second	(Spain) Aleix Espargaró	Forward Yamaha
Third	(United Kingdom) Cal Crutchlow	Ducati

Moto2
Pole position
Rider	(Spain) Maverick Viñales	Kalex
Time	1:54.073	
Fastest lap
Rider	(Switzerland) Thomas Lüthi	Suter
Time	1:54.254 on lap 17	
Podium
First	(Spain) Maverick Viñales	Kalex
Second	(Spain) Esteve Rabat	Kalex
Third	(France) Johann Zarco	Caterham Suter

Moto3
Pole position
Rider	(Spain) Álex Rins	Honda
Time	1:58.318	
Fastest lap
Rider	(Italy) Romano Fenati	KTM
Time	2:00.176 on lap 19	
Podium
First	(Italy) Romano Fenati	KTM
Second	(Spain) Álex Márquez	Honda
Third	(United Kingdom) Danny Kent	Husqvarna

The 2014 Aragon motorcycle Grand Prix was the fourteenth round of the 2014 Grand Prix motorcycle racing season. It was held at the MotorLand Aragón in Alcañiz on 28 September 2014.

The MotoGP race started in dry conditions, but as the race progressed, the conditions closed in and rain started to fall. Yamaha rider Jorge Lorenzo pitted earlier than his rivals, and as conditions continued to deteriorate, Lorenzo proved to be the quickest rider on track. Accordingly, Lorenzo went on to win the race – his first victory of the season – by over 10 seconds from Forward Racing rider Aleix Espargaró. Espargaró's result was the first instance of an Open class competitor finishing on the podium. He only just held off Cal Crutchlow at the finish, by a margin of 0.017 seconds; Crutchlow recorded his first podium finish for Ducati. Repsol Honda riders Marc Márquez and Dani Pedrosa initially tried to stay out on dry tyres, but both riders crashed. They eventually remounted, swapped bikes, and ultimately finished the race 13th and 14th. Valentino Rossi had been making progress up the order, from sixth on the grid, when he ran wide onto the grass – damp due to the wet conditions – and crashed heavily. He lost consciousness briefly after the crash, and was transferred to a hospital in Alcañiz for a precautionary CT scan.

In the supporting categories, Maverick Viñales took his second victory of the 2014 Moto2 season, leading home championship leader Esteve Rabat, while Johann Zarco completed the podium for the second race in succession. In Moto3, Romano Fenati won his fourth race of the season, beating Álex Márquez – who took the championship lead in the process – and Danny Kent to the line in a close finish. The championship leader going into the round, Jack Miller, could only finish 27th, after colliding with Márquez. Both riders met with race directors after the race in regard to the incident, but no further action was warranted.

== Classification ==
=== MotoGP ===
Pos.	No.	Rider	Team	Manufacturer	Laps	Time/Retired	Grid	Points
1	99	(Spain) Jorge Lorenzo	Movistar Yamaha MotoGP	Yamaha	23	44:20.406	7	25
2	41	(Spain) Aleix Espargaró	NGM Forward Racing	Forward Yamaha	23	+10.295	10	20
3	35	(United Kingdom) Cal Crutchlow	Ducati Team	Ducati	23	+10.312	5	16
4	6	(Germany) Stefan Bradl	LCR Honda MotoGP	Honda	23	+11.718	8	13
5	38	(United Kingdom) Bradley Smith	Monster Yamaha Tech 3	Yamaha	23	+29.483	11	11
6	44	(Spain) Pol Espargaró	Monster Yamaha Tech 3	Yamaha	23	+29.686	4	10
7	19	(Spain) Álvaro Bautista	Go&Fun Honda Gresini	Honda	23	+29.763	15	9
8	7	(Japan) Hiroshi Aoyama	Drive M7 Aspar	Honda	23	+37.841	14	8
9	69	(United States) Nicky Hayden	Drive M7 Aspar	Honda	23	+42.957	18	7
10	45	(United Kingdom) Scott Redding	Go&Fun Honda Gresini	Honda	23	+53.937	16	6
11	9	(Italy) Danilo Petrucci	Octo IodaRacing Team	ART	23	+59.824	20	5
12	15	(San Marino) Alex de Angelis	NGM Forward Racing	Forward Yamaha	23	+1:00.718	19	4
13	93	(Spain) Marc Márquez	Repsol Honda Team	Honda	23	+1:15.227	1	3
14	26	(Spain) Dani Pedrosa	Repsol Honda Team	Honda	23	+1:24.526	2	2
15	68	(Colombia) Yonny Hernández	Energy T.I. Pramac Racing	Ducati	23	+1:38.255	13	1
16	70	(United Kingdom) Michael Laverty	Paul Bird Motorsport	PBM	22	+1 lap	21	
17	63	(France) Mike Di Meglio	Avintia Racing	Avintia	22	+1 lap	23	
18	23	(Australia) Broc Parkes	Paul Bird Motorsport	PBM	22	+1 lap	22	
19	8	(Spain) Héctor Barberá	Avintia Racing	Ducati	22	+1 lap	12	
Ret	4	(Italy) Andrea Dovizioso	Ducati Team	Ducati	18	Accident	9	
Ret	46	(Italy) Valentino Rossi	Movistar Yamaha MotoGP	Yamaha	3	Accident	6	
Ret	29	(Italy) Andrea Iannone	Pramac Racing	Ducati	1	Accident	3	
Ret	17	(Czech Republic) Karel Abraham	Cardion AB Motoracing	Honda	1	Retirement	17	

=== Moto2 ===
Pos.	No.	Rider	Manufacturer	Laps	Time/Retired	Grid	Points
1	40	(Spain) Maverick Viñales	Kalex	21	40:16.321	1	25
2	53	(Spain) Esteve Rabat	Kalex	21	+1.285	5	20
3	5	(France) Johann Zarco	Caterham Suter	21	+4.876	2	16
4	12	(Switzerland) Thomas Lüthi	Suter	21	+5.033	6	13
5	21	(Italy) Franco Morbidelli	Kalex	21	+5.960	4	11
6	77	(Switzerland) Dominique Aegerter	Suter	21	+6.405	8	10
7	36	(Finland) Mika Kallio	Kalex	21	+6.525	3	9
8	81	(Spain) Jordi Torres	Suter	21	+17.313	13	8
9	22	(United Kingdom) Sam Lowes	Speed Up	21	+18.148	20	7
10	23	(Germany) Marcel Schrötter	Tech 3	21	+19.693	10	6
11	55	(Malaysia) Hafizh Syahrin	Kalex	21	+20.948	17	5
12	11	(Germany) Sandro Cortese	Kalex	21	+21.110	9	4
13	39	(Spain) Luis Salom	Kalex	21	+22.665	15	3
14	88	(Spain) Ricard Cardús	Tech 3	21	+24.403	19	2
15	30	(Japan) Takaaki Nakagami	Kalex	21	+24.465	7	1
16	60	(Spain) Julián Simón	Kalex	21	+27.402	11	
17	8	(United Kingdom) Gino Rea	Suter	21	+39.660	24	
18	97	(Spain) Román Ramos	Speed Up	21	+39.862	29	
19	25	(Malaysia) Azlan Shah	Kalex	21	+40.073	32	
20	96	(France) Louis Rossi	Kalex	21	+40.185	21	
21	54	(Italy) Mattia Pasini	Kalex	21	+40.751	16	
22	14	(Thailand) Ratthapark Wilairot	Caterham Suter	21	+41.064	27	
23	94	(Germany) Jonas Folger	Kalex	21	+41.258	12	
24	84	(Italy) Riccardo Russo	Suter	21	+42.181	30	
25	7	(Italy) Lorenzo Baldassarri	Suter	21	+42.275	25	
26	70	(Switzerland) Robin Mulhauser	Suter	21	+42.410	28	
27	4	(Switzerland) Randy Krummenacher	Suter	21	+44.360	31	
28	20	(France) Florian Marino	Kalex	21	+47.565	26	
29	18	(Spain) Nicolás Terol	Suter	21	+49.743	22	
30	10	(Thailand) Thitipong Warokorn	Kalex	21	+1:05.670	33	
Ret	49	(Spain) Axel Pons	Kalex	12	Accident	18	
Ret	9	(United States) Kenny Noyes	TSR	6	Retirement	34	
Ret	19	(Belgium) Xavier Siméon	Suter	4	Retirement	14	
Ret	95	(Australia) Anthony West	Speed Up	4	Retirement	23	
OFFICIAL MOTO2 REPORT

=== Moto3 ===
Pos.	No.	Rider	Manufacturer	Laps	Time/Retired	Grid	Points
1	5	(Italy) Romano Fenati	KTM	20	40:52.209	13	25
2	12	(Spain) Álex Márquez	Honda	20	+0.057	5	20
3	52	(United Kingdom) Danny Kent	Husqvarna	20	+0.283	2	16
4	42	(Spain) Álex Rins	Honda	20	+11.631	1	13
5	84	(Czech Republic) Jakub Kornfeil	KTM	20	+18.382	12	11
6	33	(Italy) Enea Bastianini	KTM	20	+19.259	6	10
7	44	(Portugal) Miguel Oliveira	Mahindra	20	+23.706	20	9
8	41	(South Africa) Brad Binder	Mahindra	20	+24.773	15	8
9	23	(Italy) Niccolò Antonelli	KTM	20	+37.023	9	7
10	10	(France) Alexis Masbou	Honda	20	+39.044	16	6
11	50	(Japan) Hiroki Ono	Honda	20	+39.584	19	5
12	32	(Spain) Isaac Viñales	KTM	20	+1:02.015	7	4
13	7	(Spain) Efrén Vázquez	Honda	20	+1:02.061	10	3
14	95	(France) Jules Danilo	Mahindra	20	+1:02.238	25	2
15	63	(Malaysia) Zulfahmi Khairuddin	Honda	20	+1:05.268	18	1
16	13	(Netherlands) Jasper Iwema	Mahindra	20	+1:05.282	31	
17	57	(Brazil) Eric Granado	KTM	20	+1:06.486	21	
18	55	(Italy) Andrea Locatelli	Mahindra	20	+1:12.074	30	
19	38	(Malaysia) Hafiq Azmi	KTM	20	+1:21.830	28	
20	91	(Argentina) Gabriel Rodrigo	KTM	20	+1:25.126	29	
21	4	(Venezuela) Gabriel Ramos	Kalex KTM	20	+1:25.242	35	
22	22	(Spain) Ana Carrasco	Kalex KTM	20	+1:35.044	32	
23	98	(Czech Republic) Karel Hanika	KTM	20	+1:37.368	17	
24	21	(Italy) Francesco Bagnaia	KTM	19	+1 lap	22	
25	31	(Finland) Niklas Ajo	Husqvarna	19	+1 lap	26	
26	43	(Germany) Luca Grünwald	Kalex KTM	18	+2 laps	33	
27	8	(Australia) Jack Miller	KTM	17	+3 laps	4	
Ret	17	(United Kingdom) John McPhee	Honda	12	Accident	8	
Ret	16	(Italy) Andrea Migno	Mahindra	9	Accident	14	
Ret	65	(Germany) Philipp Öttl	Kalex KTM	8	Accident	34	
Ret	99	(Spain) Jorge Navarro	Kalex KTM	5	Accident	11	
Ret	19	(Italy) Alessandro Tonucci	Mahindra	5	Accident	23	
Ret	58	(Spain) Juan Francisco Guevara	Kalex KTM	3	Accident	3	
Ret	9	(Netherlands) Scott Deroue	Kalex KTM	2	Accident	27	
Ret	3	(Italy) Matteo Ferrari	Mahindra	0	Accident	24	
OFFICIAL MOTO3 REPORT

== Championship standings after the race (MotoGP) ==
Below are the standings for the top five riders and constructors after round fourteen has concluded.

Riders' Championship standings

Pos.	Rider	Points
1	(Spain) Marc Márquez	292
2	(Spain) Dani Pedrosa	217
3	(Italy) Valentino Rossi	214
4	(Spain) Jorge Lorenzo	202
5	(Italy) Andrea Dovizioso	142

Constructors' Championship standings

Pos.	Constructor	Points
1	(Japan) Honda	329
2	(Japan) Yamaha	264
3	(Italy) Ducati	165
4	(Switzerland) Forward Yamaha	117
5	(Italy) ART	9

- Note: Only the top five positions are included for both sets of standings.

Previous race: 2014 San Marino Grand Prix	FIM Grand Prix World Championship; 2014 season	Next race: 2014 Japanese Grand Prix
Previous race: 2013 Aragon Grand Prix	Aragon motorcycle Grand Prix	Next race: 2015 Aragon Grand Prix
