= 2014 Malaysian motorcycle Grand Prix =

(Malaysia) 2014 Malaysian Grand Prix
Race details
- Race 17 of 18 races in the 2014 Grand Prix motorcycle racing season
- Date: 26 October 2014
- Official name: Shell Advance Malaysian Motorcycle Grand Prix
- Location: Sepang International Circuit
- Course: Permanent racing facility; 5.543 km (3.444 mi)

MotoGP
Pole position
Rider	(Spain) Marc Márquez	Honda
Time	1:59.791	
Fastest lap
Rider	(Spain) Marc Márquez	Honda
Time	2:01.150 on lap 2	
Podium
First	(Spain) Marc Márquez	Honda
Second	(Italy) Valentino Rossi	Yamaha
Third	(Spain) Jorge Lorenzo	Yamaha

Moto2
Pole position
Rider	(Spain) Esteve Rabat	Kalex
Time	2:07.429	
Fastest lap
Rider	(Finland) Mika Kallio	Kalex
Time	2:07.949 on lap 5	
Podium
First	(Spain) Maverick Viñales	Kalex
Second	(Finland) Mika Kallio	Kalex
Third	(Spain) Esteve Rabat	Kalex

Moto3
Pole position
Rider	(Australia) Jack Miller	KTM
Time	2:12.450	
Fastest lap
Rider	(Spain) Álex Rins	Honda
Time	2:13.731 on lap 2	
Podium
First	(Spain) Efrén Vázquez	Honda
Second	(Australia) Jack Miller	KTM
Third	(Spain) Álex Rins	Honda

The 2014 Malaysian motorcycle Grand Prix was the seventeenth round of the 2014 Grand Prix motorcycle racing season. It was held at the Sepang International Circuit in Sepang on 26 October 2014.

== Details ==
In MotoGP, world champion Marc Márquez took his 12th win of the season, matching Mick Doohan's record of most premier class victories in a single season, from 1997. The podium was completed by the two Movistar Yamaha riders; Valentino Rossi finished in second place and Jorge Lorenzo finished in third place. Márquez's result was also good enough for Honda to claim the manufacturers' championship, with a race to spare. Dani Pedrosa was also in contention during the race, but suffered two crashes and had to retire from the race. The result sealed fourth place in the championship for Pedrosa. Andrea Iannone withdrew from the race due to a crash in practice and resultant injury. Pol Espargaró also crashed during a free practice session, setting his bike aflame.

In the Moto2 category, a third-place finish for Esteve Rabat was enough for the Marc VDS Racing Team rider to clinch the Moto2 world championship with a race to spare. Rabat had started the race from pole position, but eventually trailed his title rivals Maverick Viñales and Mika Kallio home. It was Viñales' third victory in four races, and ensured that the battle for the runner-up placing in the championship would go down to the final race in Valencia; Kallio held the advantage by 15 points over Viñales.

In Moto3, Efrén Vázquez took his second victory of the season – and of his career – ahead of Jack Miller and Álex Rins. Championship leader Álex Márquez finished only fifth, reducing his championship lead over Miller to eleven points. Post-race, Marquez's Estrella Galicia 0,0 team protested the results and the riding manner of Miller, riding for the rival Ajo Motorsport team. Race directors ultimately decided that no further action was warranted.

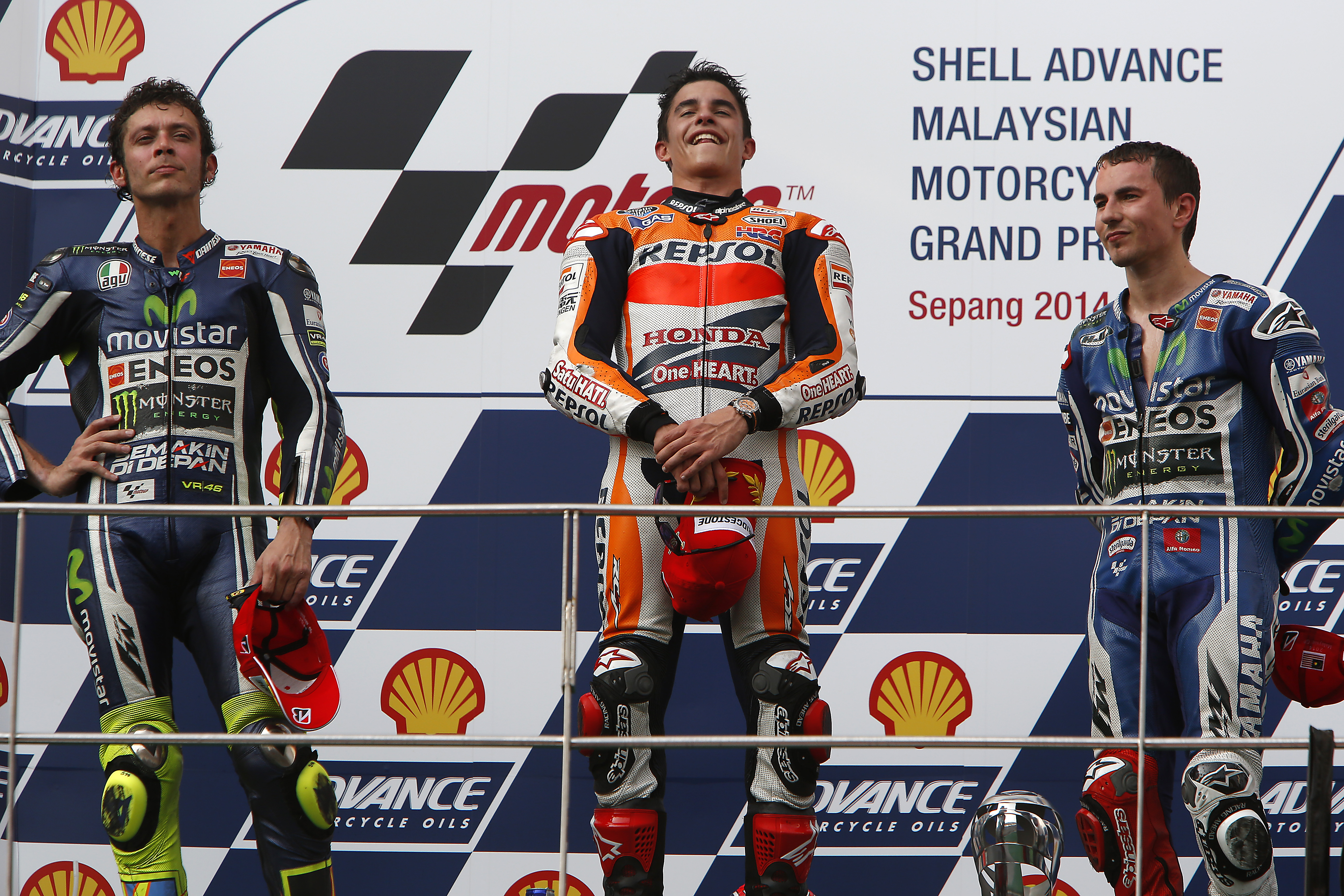
Valentino Rossi, Marc Márquez and Jorge Lorenzo, celebrating on the podium after finishing second, first and third at the MotoGP race

== Classification ==
=== MotoGP ===
Pos.	No.	Rider	Team	Manufacturer	Laps	Time/retired	Grid	Points
1	93	(Spain) Marc Márquez	Repsol Honda Team	Honda	20	40:45.523	1	25
2	46	(Italy) Valentino Rossi	Movistar Yamaha MotoGP	Yamaha	20	+2.445	6	20
3	99	(Spain) Jorge Lorenzo	Movistar Yamaha MotoGP	Yamaha	20	+3.508	3	16
4	6	(Germany) Stefan Bradl	LCR Honda MotoGP	Honda	20	+21.234	4	13
5	38	(United Kingdom) Bradley Smith	Monster Yamaha Tech 3	Yamaha	20	+22.283	9	11
6	44	(Spain) Pol Espargaró	Monster Yamaha Tech 3	Yamaha	20	+34.668	12	10
7	68	(Colombia) Yonny Hernández	Energy T.I. Pramac Racing	Ducati	20	+38.435	13	9
8	4	(Italy) Andrea Dovizioso	Ducati Team	Ducati	20	+48.839	5	8
9	8	(Spain) Héctor Barberá	Avintia Racing	Ducati	20	+50.792	16	7
10	45	(United Kingdom) Scott Redding	Go&Fun Honda Gresini	Honda	20	+59.088	17	6
11	7	(Japan) Hiroshi Aoyama	Drive M7 Aspar	Honda	20	+1:15.949	11	5
12	70	(United Kingdom) Michael Laverty	Paul Bird Motorsport	PBM	20	+1:17.966	20	4
13	63	(France) Mike Di Meglio	Avintia Racing	Avintia	20	+1:27.773	21	3
14	23	(Australia) Broc Parkes	Paul Bird Motorsport	PBM	20	+1:44.244	22	2
Ret	15	(San Marino) Alex de Angelis	NGM Forward Racing	Forward Yamaha	19	Retirement	18	
Ret	9	(Italy) Danilo Petrucci	Octo IodaRacing Team	ART	14	Retirement	19	
Ret	26	(Spain) Dani Pedrosa	Repsol Honda Team	Honda	12	Accident	2	
Ret	17	(Czech Republic) Karel Abraham	Cardion AB Motoracing	Honda	11	Accident	15	
Ret	69	(United States) Nicky Hayden	Drive M7 Aspar	Honda	6	Accident	14	
Ret	35	(United Kingdom) Cal Crutchlow	Ducati Team	Ducati	4	Retirement	8	
Ret	41	(Spain) Aleix Espargaró	NGM Forward Racing	Forward Yamaha	1	Collisions	7	
Ret	19	(Spain) Álvaro Bautista	Go&Fun Honda Gresini	Honda	1	Collisions	10	
DNS	29	(Italy) Andrea Iannone	Pramac Racing	Ducati		Did not start		

=== Moto2 ===
Pos.	No.	Rider	Manufacturer	Laps	Time/retired	Grid	Points
1	40	(Spain) Maverick Viñales	Kalex	19	40:46.754	4	25
2	36	(Finland) Mika Kallio	Kalex	19	+2.694	2	20
3	53	(Spain) Esteve Rabat	Kalex	19	+8.054	1	16
4	5	(France) Johann Zarco	Caterham Suter	19	+10.590	8	13
5	77	(Switzerland) Dominique Aegerter	Suter	19	+10.663	9	11
6	60	(Spain) Julián Simón	Kalex	19	+10.769	7	10
7	11	(Germany) Sandro Cortese	Kalex	19	+15.657	3	9
8	12	(Switzerland) Thomas Lüthi	Suter	19	+18.839	5	8
9	94	(Germany) Jonas Folger	Kalex	19	+19.486	12	7
10	23	(Germany) Marcel Schrötter	Tech 3	19	+24.887	11	6
11	39	(Spain) Luis Salom	Kalex	19	+28.234	16	5
12	88	(Spain) Ricard Cardús	Tech 3	19	+30.338	24	4
13	54	(Italy) Mattia Pasini	Kalex	19	+30.533	34	3
14	44	(Italy) Roberto Rolfo	Suter	19	+30.548	19	2
15	81	(Spain) Jordi Torres	Suter	19	+34.769	22	1
16	20	(France) Florian Marino	Kalex	19	+36.613	20	
17	7	(Italy) Lorenzo Baldassarri	Suter	19	+38.869	23	
18	95	(Australia) Anthony West	Speed Up	19	+42.201	26	
19	19	(Belgium) Xavier Siméon	Suter	19	+47.876	14	
20	25	(Malaysia) Azlan Shah	Kalex	19	+52.950	29	
21	10	(Thailand) Thitipong Warokorn	Kalex	19	+53.163	30	
22	97	(Spain) Román Ramos	Speed Up	19	+59.999	31	
23	71	(Japan) Tomoyoshi Koyama	NTS	19	+1:03.331	28	
24	18	(Spain) Nicolás Terol	Suter	19	+1:08.275	27	
25	46	(Thailand) Decha Kraisart	Tech 3	19	+1:16.996	32	
26	4	(Switzerland) Randy Krummenacher	Suter	18	+1 lap	25	
Ret	21	(Italy) Franco Morbidelli	Kalex	15	Retirement	13	
Ret	22	(United Kingdom) Sam Lowes	Speed Up	14	Retirement	15	
Ret	49	(Spain) Axel Pons	Kalex	12	Retirement	10	
Ret	55	(Malaysia) Hafizh Syahrin	Kalex	10	Accident	18	
Ret	96	(France) Louis Rossi	Kalex	8	Accident	17	
Ret	30	(Japan) Takaaki Nakagami	Kalex	6	Accident	6	
Ret	14	(Thailand) Ratthapark Wilairot	Caterham Suter	6	Accident	33	
Ret	8	(United Kingdom) Gino Rea	Suter	0	Accident	21	
DNS	70	(Switzerland) Robin Mulhauser	Suter		Did not start		
OFFICIAL MOTO2 REPORT

=== Moto3 ===
Pos.	No.	Rider	Manufacturer	Laps	Time/retired	Grid	Points
1	7	(Spain) Efrén Vázquez	Honda	18	40:41.002	4	25
2	8	(Australia) Jack Miller	KTM	18	+0.213	1	20
3	42	(Spain) Álex Rins	Honda	18	+0.385	17	16
4	52	(United Kingdom) Danny Kent	Husqvarna	18	+0.803	7	13
5	12	(Spain) Álex Márquez	Honda	18	+0.831	5	11
6	10	(France) Alexis Masbou	Honda	18	+1.073	11	10
7	23	(Italy) Niccolò Antonelli	KTM	18	+1.916	13	9
8	84	(Czech Republic) Jakub Kornfeil	KTM	18	+2.089	3	8
9	98	(Czech Republic) Karel Hanika	KTM	18	+7.336	12	7
10	33	(Italy) Enea Bastianini	KTM	18	+9.520	10	6
11	58	(Spain) Juan Francisco Guevara	Kalex KTM	18	+17.407	19	5
12	99	(Spain) Jorge Navarro	Kalex KTM	18	+17.610	20	4
13	38	(Malaysia) Hafiq Azmi	KTM	18	+29.592	16	3
14	19	(Italy) Alessandro Tonucci	Mahindra	18	+29.745	28	2
15	2	(Australia) Remy Gardner	KTM	18	+37.467	29	1
16	43	(Germany) Luca Grünwald	Kalex KTM	18	+37.505	24	
17	95	(France) Jules Danilo	Mahindra	18	+37.792	26	
18	65	(Germany) Philipp Öttl	Kalex KTM	18	+38.773	30	
19	4	(Venezuela) Gabriel Ramos	Kalex KTM	18	+55.583	34	
20	88	(Malaysia) Hafiza Rofa	KTM	18	+1:36.170	31	
Ret	17	(United Kingdom) John McPhee	Honda	17	Accident	2	
Ret	21	(Italy) Francesco Bagnaia	KTM	12	Retirement	15	
Ret	32	(Spain) Isaac Viñales	KTM	11	Accident	8	
Ret	5	(Italy) Romano Fenati	KTM	11	Retirement	6	
Ret	9	(Netherlands) Scott Deroue	Kalex KTM	8	Accident	33	
Ret	3	(Italy) Matteo Ferrari	Mahindra	8	Accident	23	
Ret	55	(Italy) Andrea Locatelli	Mahindra	7	Accident	27	
Ret	41	(South Africa) Brad Binder	Mahindra	6	Retirement	25	
Ret	31	(Finland) Niklas Ajo	Husqvarna	4	Retirement	14	
Ret	63	(Malaysia) Zulfahmi Khairuddin	Honda	1	Accident	22	
Ret	16	(Italy) Andrea Migno	Mahindra	1	Accident	18	
Ret	13	(Netherlands) Jasper Iwema	Mahindra	1	Retirement	32	
Ret	93	(Malaysia) Ramdan Rosli	KTM	1	Retirement	21	
Ret	44	(Portugal) Miguel Oliveira	Mahindra	0	Accident	9	
OFFICIAL MOTO3 REPORT

== Championship standings after the race (MotoGP) ==
Below are the standings for the top five riders and constructors after round seventeen concluded.

Riders' championship standings

Pos.	Rider	Points
1	(Spain) Marc Márquez	337
2	(Italy) Valentino Rossi	275
3	(Spain) Jorge Lorenzo	263
4	(Spain) Dani Pedrosa	230
5	(Italy) Andrea Dovizioso	174

Constructors' championship standings

Pos.	Constructor	Points
1	(Japan) Honda	384
2	(Japan) Yamaha	334
3	(Italy) Ducati	198
4	(Switzerland) Forward Yamaha	129
5	(United Kingdom) PBM	15

- Note: Only the top five positions are included for both sets of standings.

Previous race: 2014 Australian Grand Prix	FIM Grand Prix World Championship; 2014 season	Next race: 2014 Valencian Grand Prix
Previous race: 2013 Malaysian Grand Prix	Malaysian motorcycle Grand Prix	Next race: 2015 Malaysian Grand Prix
