= 2014 Qatar motorcycle Grand Prix =

2014 Qatar Grand Prix
Race details
- Race 1 of 18 races in the 2014 Grand Prix motorcycle racing season
- Date: 23 March 2014
- Official name: Commercialbank Grand Prix of Qatar
- Location: Losail International Circuit
- Course: Permanent racing facility; 5.380 km (3.343 mi)

MotoGP
Pole position
Rider	(Spain) Marc Márquez	Honda
Time	1:54.507	
Fastest lap
Rider	(Spain) Álvaro Bautista	Honda
Time	1:55.575 on lap 4	
Podium
First	(Spain) Marc Márquez	Honda
Second	(Italy) Valentino Rossi	Yamaha
Third	(Spain) Dani Pedrosa	Honda

Moto2
Pole position
Rider	(Spain) Esteve Rabat	Kalex
Time	2:00.081	
Fastest lap
Rider	(Spain) Maverick Viñales	Kalex
Time	2:00.168 on lap 9	
Podium
First	(Spain) Esteve Rabat	Kalex
Second	(Finland) Mika Kallio	Kalex
Third	(Switzerland) Thomas Lüthi	Suter

Moto3
Pole position
Rider	(Spain) Álex Rins	Honda
Time	2:05.973	
Fastest lap
Rider	(France) Alexis Masbou	Honda
Time	2:05.862 on lap 9	
Podium
First	(Australia) Jack Miller	KTM
Second	(Spain) Álex Márquez	Honda
Third	(Spain) Efrén Vázquez	Honda

The 2014 Qatar motorcycle Grand Prix was the first round of the 2014 MotoGP season. It was held at the Losail International Circuit in Doha on 23 March 2014.

In the MotoGP class, Marc Márquez began his title defence with a victory ahead of Valentino Rossi and teammate Dani Pedrosa. Rossi's teammate, Jorge Lorenzo led at the start but then crashed and had his bike destroyed in the gravel trap.

The MotoGP race also saw the début of the new "Factory" and "Open" classes for each bike. The MSMA prototypes were reclassified as the "Factory" class, and the Claiming Rule Teams sub-category was rebranded as the "Open" class. Bikes in the Open class used the same MotoGP ECU and identical software, and the teams that were in the Factory class were permitted to use their own software.

In the Moto2 race, Esteve Rabat began his title-winning season with a victory ahead of fellow Kalex rider Mika Kallio and Suter rider Thomas Lüthi. The fastest lap was set by Maverick Viñales in his first and only season in the Moto2 class.

The Moto3 race saw Jack Miller take the victory ahead of Spaniards Álex Márquez and Efrén Vázquez. Both Miller and Márquez would eventually fight for the title over the course of the season, with the latter eventually taking the title by two points.

== Classification ==
=== MotoGP ===
Pos.	No.	Rider	Team	Manufacturer	Laps	Time/Retired	Grid	Points
1	93	(Spain) Marc Márquez	Repsol Honda Team	Honda	22	42:40.561	1	25
2	46	(Italy) Valentino Rossi	Movistar Yamaha MotoGP	Yamaha	22	+0.259	10	20
3	26	(Spain) Dani Pedrosa	Repsol Honda Team	Honda	22	+3.370	6	16
4	41	(Spain) Aleix Espargaró	NGM Forward Racing	Forward Yamaha	22	+11.623	9	13
5	4	(Italy) Andrea Dovizioso	Ducati Team	Ducati	22	+12.159	4	11
6	35	(United Kingdom) Cal Crutchlow	Ducati Team	Ducati	22	+28.526	8	10
7	45	(United Kingdom) Scott Redding	Go&Fun Honda Gresini	Honda	22	+32.593	16	9
8	69	(United States) Nicky Hayden	Drive M7 Aspar	Honda	22	+32.628	13	8
9	5	(United States) Colin Edwards	NGM Forward Racing	Forward Yamaha	22	+39.547	14	7
10	29	(Italy) Andrea Iannone	Pramac Racing	Ducati	22	+43.360	11	6
11	7	(Japan) Hiroshi Aoyama	Drive M7 Aspar	Honda	22	+46.595	15	5
12	68	(Colombia) Yonny Hernández	Energy T.I. Pramac Racing	Ducati	22	+46.688	17	4
13	17	(Czech Republic) Karel Abraham	Cardion AB Motoracing	Honda	22	+50.581	18	3
14	9	(Italy) Danilo Petrucci	IodaRacing Project	ART	22	+1:03.127	20	2
15	23	(Australia) Broc Parkes	Paul Bird Motorsport	PBM	22	+1:14.386	21	1
16	70	(United Kingdom) Michael Laverty	Paul Bird Motorsport	PBM	22	+1:32.593	23	
17	63	(France) Mike Di Meglio	Avintia Racing	Avintia	22	+1:36.085	22	
Ret	19	(Spain) Álvaro Bautista	Go&Fun Honda Gresini	Honda	20	Accident	2	
Ret	38	(United Kingdom) Bradley Smith	Monster Yamaha Tech 3	Yamaha	18	Accident	3	
Ret	44	(Spain) Pol Espargaró	Monster Yamaha Tech 3	Yamaha	17	Retirement	12	
Ret	6	(Germany) Stefan Bradl	LCR Honda MotoGP	Honda	8	Accident	7	
Ret	8	(Spain) Héctor Barberá	Avintia Racing	Avintia	4	Retirement	19	
Ret	99	(Spain) Jorge Lorenzo	Movistar Yamaha MotoGP	Yamaha	0	Accident	5	

=== Moto2 ===
Pos.	No.	Rider	Manufacturer	Laps	Time/Retired	Grid	Points
1	53	(Spain) Esteve Rabat	Kalex	20	40:20.963	1	25
2	36	(Finland) Mika Kallio	Kalex	20	+1.059	6	20
3	12	(Switzerland) Thomas Lüthi	Suter	20	+3.741	4	16
4	40	(Spain) Maverick Viñales	Kalex	20	+4.043	14	13
5	3	(Italy) Simone Corsi	Forward KLX	20	+5.830	10	11
6	22	(United Kingdom) Sam Lowes	Speed Up	20	+14.170	5	10
7	11	(Germany) Sandro Cortese	Kalex	20	+24.943	2	9
8	81	(Spain) Jordi Torres	Suter	20	+25.196	16	8
9	95	(Australia) Anthony West	Speed Up	20	+25.322	26	7
10	96	(France) Louis Rossi	Kalex	20	+26.687	20	6
11	94	(Germany) Jonas Folger	Kalex	20	+26.873	15	5
12	88	(Spain) Ricard Cardús	Tech 3	20	+26.914	18	4
13	4	(Switzerland) Randy Krummenacher	Suter	20	+31.671	22	3
14	39	(Spain) Luis Salom	Kalex	20	+40.588	17	2
15	55	(Malaysia) Hafizh Syahrin	Kalex	20	+40.695	30	1
16	60	(Spain) Julián Simón	Kalex	20	+41.810	19	
17	54	(Italy) Mattia Pasini	Forward KLX	20	+44.030	12	
18	25	(Malaysia) Azlan Shah	Kalex	20	+52.813	28	
19	97	(Spain) Román Ramos	Speed Up	20	+53.563	31	
20	10	(Thailand) Thitipong Warokorn	Kalex	20	+1:10.995	32	
21	45	(Japan) Tetsuta Nagashima	TSR	20	+1:11.391	34	
22	70	(Switzerland) Robin Mulhauser	Suter	20	+1:11.811	35	
23	5	(France) Johann Zarco	Caterham Suter	20	+1:52.348	9	
24	19	(Belgium) Xavier Siméon	Suter	20	+1:52.446	7	
25	21	(Italy) Franco Morbidelli	Kalex	19	+1 lap	29	
DSQ	30	(Japan) Takaaki Nakagami	Kalex	20	Disqualified	3	
Ret	7	(Italy) Lorenzo Baldassarri	Suter	19	Accident	23	
Ret	77	(Switzerland) Dominique Aegerter	Suter	15	Retirement	11	
Ret	18	(Spain) Nicolás Terol	Suter	15	Retirement	21	
Ret	23	(Germany) Marcel Schrötter	Tech 3	11	Accident	13	
Ret	49	(Spain) Axel Pons	Kalex	11	Retirement	25	
Ret	98	(Qatar) Mashel Al Naimi	Speed Up	4	Retirement	33	
Ret	8	(United Kingdom) Gino Rea	Suter	2	Retirement	24	
Ret	15	(San Marino) Alex de Angelis	Suter	0	Accident	8	
Ret	2	(United States) Josh Herrin	Caterham Suter	0	Accident	27	
OFFICIAL MOTO2 REPORT

=== Moto3 ===
Pos.	No.	Rider	Manufacturer	Laps	Time/Retired	Grid	Points
1	8	(Australia) Jack Miller	KTM	18	38:05.810	3	25
2	12	(Spain) Álex Márquez	Honda	18	+0.233	2	20
3	7	(Spain) Efrén Vázquez	Honda	18	+0.280	15	16
4	44	(Portugal) Miguel Oliveira	Mahindra	18	+0.295	11	13
5	42	(Spain) Álex Rins	Honda	18	+0.369	1	11
6	84	(Czech Republic) Jakub Kornfeil	KTM	18	+0.586	4	10
7	10	(France) Alexis Masbou	Honda	18	+2.109	14	9
8	32	(Spain) Isaac Viñales	KTM	18	+2.161	5	8
9	23	(Italy) Niccolò Antonelli	KTM	18	+8.153	9	7
10	21	(Italy) Francesco Bagnaia	KTM	18	+8.173	10	6
11	17	(United Kingdom) John McPhee	Honda	18	+8.195	7	5
12	5	(Italy) Romano Fenati	KTM	18	+8.219	8	4
13	52	(United Kingdom) Danny Kent	Husqvarna	18	+11.269	6	3
14	98	(Czech Republic) Karel Hanika	KTM	18	+11.292	19	2
15	41	(South Africa) Brad Binder	Mahindra	18	+11.322	17	1
16	33	(Italy) Enea Bastianini	KTM	18	+22.159	21	
17	11	(Belgium) Livio Loi	Kalex KTM	18	+22.202	20	
18	63	(Malaysia) Zulfahmi Khairuddin	Honda	18	+36.686	23	
19	9	(Netherlands) Scott Deroue	Kalex KTM	18	+36.691	18	
20	65	(Germany) Philipp Öttl	Kalex KTM	18	+36.755	22	
21	19	(Italy) Alessandro Tonucci	Mahindra	18	+37.858	28	
22	43	(Germany) Luca Grünwald	Kalex KTM	18	+37.876	24	
23	55	(Italy) Andrea Locatelli	Mahindra	18	+45.501	30	
24	22	(Spain) Ana Carrasco	Kalex KTM	18	+45.650	25	
25	51	(Netherlands) Bryan Schouten	Mahindra	18	+1:08.694	27	
26	31	(Finland) Niklas Ajo	Husqvarna	17	+1 lap	16	
Ret	95	(France) Jules Danilo	Mahindra	17	Accident	31	
Ret	3	(Italy) Matteo Ferrari	Mahindra	14	Retirement	26	
Ret	58	(Spain) Juan Francisco Guevara	Kalex KTM	6	Accident	13	
Ret	4	(Venezuela) Gabriel Ramos	Kalex KTM	6	Retirement	32	
Ret	57	(Brazil) Eric Granado	KTM	2	Retirement	12	
Ret	38	(Malaysia) Hafiq Azmi	KTM	0	Accident	29	
DNS	61	(Australia) Arthur Sissis	Mahindra		Did not start		
OFFICIAL MOTO3 REPORT

== Championship standings after the race (MotoGP) ==
Below are the standings for the top five riders and constructors after round one has concluded.

Riders' Championship standings

Pos.	Rider	Points
1	(Spain) Marc Márquez	25
2	(Italy) Valentino Rossi	20
3	(Spain) Dani Pedrosa	16
4	(Spain) Aleix Espargaró	13
5	(Italy) Andrea Dovizioso	11

Constructors' Championship standings

Pos.	Constructor	Points
1	(Japan) Honda	25
2	(Japan) Yamaha	20
3	(Switzerland) Forward Yamaha	13
4	(Italy) Ducati	11
5	(Italy) ART	2

- Note: Only the top five positions are included for both sets of standings.

Previous race: 2013 Valencian Grand Prix	FIM Grand Prix World Championship; 2014 season	Next race: 2014 Grand Prix of the Americas
Previous race: 2013 Qatar Grand Prix	Qatar motorcycle Grand Prix	Next race: 2015 Qatar Grand Prix
