= 2017 Moto3 World Championship =

6th running of the Moto3 World Championship

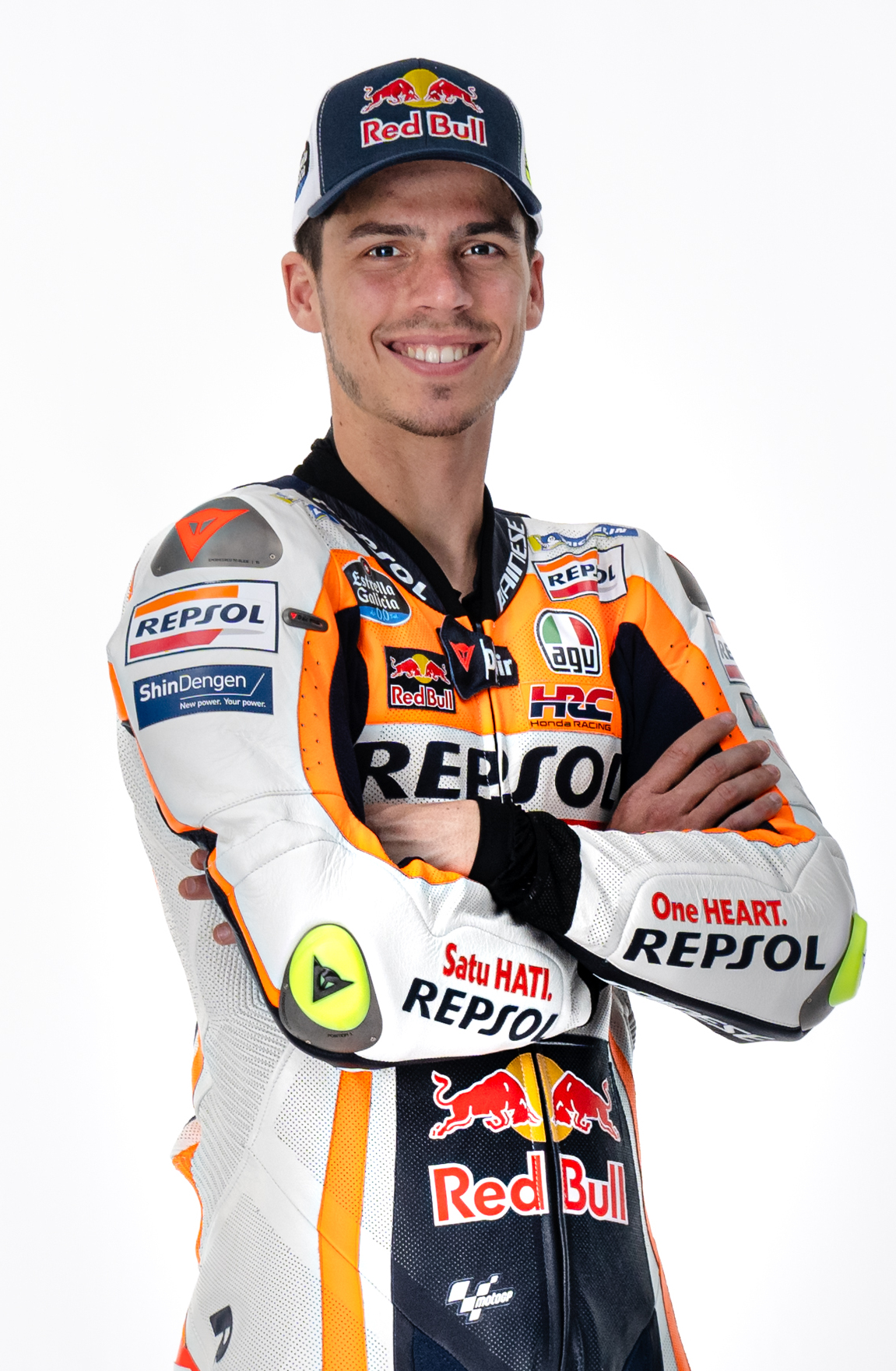
Joan Mir (pictured in 2023) was the 2017 Moto3 World Riders' Champion.

The 2017 FIM Moto3 World Championship was the lightweight class of the 69th Fédération Internationale de Motocyclisme (FIM) Road Racing World Championship season.

Brad Binder was the reigning series champion but did not defend his title as he joined the series' intermediate class, Moto2.

The riders' championship title was won by Leopard Racing rider Joan Mir with 10 victories and 13 podiums finishes.

== Calendar ==
The following Grands Prix were scheduled to take place in 2017.

Round	Date	Grand Prix	Circuit
1	26 March ‡	Grand Prix of Qatar	Lusail International Circuit, Lusail
2	9 April	Gran Premio Motul de la República Argentina	Autódromo Termas de Río Hondo, Termas de Río Hondo
3	23 April	(United States) Red Bull Grand Prix of the Americas	Circuit of the Americas, Austin
4	7 May	(Spain) Gran Premio Red Bull de España	Circuito de Jerez, Jerez de la Frontera
5	21 May	HJC Helmets Grand Prix de France	Bugatti Circuit, Le Mans
6	4 June	(Italy) Gran Premio d'Italia Oakley	Mugello Circuit, Scarperia e San Piero
7	11 June	(Catalonia) Gran Premi Monster Energy de Catalunya	Circuit de Barcelona-Catalunya, Montmeló
8	25 June	(Netherlands) Motul TT Assen	TT Circuit Assen, Assen
9	2 July	(Germany) GoPro Motorrad Grand Prix Deutschland	Sachsenring, Hohenstein-Ernstthal
10	6 August	(Czech Republic) Monster Energy Grand Prix České republiky	Brno Circuit, Brno
11	13 August	(Austria) NeroGiardini Motorrad Grand Prix von Österreich	Red Bull Ring, Spielberg
12	27 August	(United Kingdom) Octo British Grand Prix	Silverstone Circuit, Silverstone
13	10 September	Gran Premio Tribul MasterCard di San Marino e della Riviera di Rimini	Misano World Circuit, Misano Adriatico
14	24 September	(Aragon) Gran Premio Movistar de Aragón	MotorLand Aragón, Alcañiz
15	15 October	Motul Grand Prix of Japan	Motegi Circuit, Motegi
16	22 October	(Australia) Michelin Australian Motorcycle Grand Prix	Phillip Island Grand Prix Circuit, Phillip Island
17	29 October	Shell Malaysia Motorcycle Grand Prix	Sepang International Circuit, Sepang
18	12 November	(Valencian Community) Gran Premio Motul de la Comunitat Valenciana	Circuit Ricardo Tormo, Valencia

‡ = Night race

=== Calendar changes ===
- The Austrian and Czech Republic Grand Prix swapped places, with the Czech Republic hosting the tenth round, while Austria hosts the eleventh round.
- The British Grand Prix was scheduled to move from Silverstone to the new Circuit of Wales, but construction on the new track had not commenced. The two circuits reached a deal that would have seen Silverstone continue to host the British Grand Prix in 2017, with an option to host the 2018 race.

== Teams and riders ==
A provisional list of team entrants for 2017 was released on 26 October 2016. All teams used Dunlop tyres.

Team	Constructor	Motorcycle	No.	Rider	Rounds
(Germany) Peugeot MC Saxoprint	Peugeot	Peugeot MGP3O	4	(Finland) Patrik Pulkkinen	All
(Germany) Peugeot MC Saxoprint	Peugeot	Peugeot MGP3O	84	(Czech Republic) Jakub Kornfeil	All
(Italy) Marinelli Rivacold Snipers	Honda	Honda NSF250RW	5	(Italy) Romano Fenati	All
(Italy) Marinelli Rivacold Snipers	Honda	Honda NSF250RW	95	(France) Jules Danilo	All
(Spain) AGR Team	KTM	KTM RC250GP	6	(Spain) María Herrera	1–14
(Spain) Cuna de Campeones	KTM	KTM RC250GP	6	(Spain) María Herrera	18
(Spain) Cuna de Campeones	KTM	KTM RC250GP	15	(Spain) Jaume Masiá	14
(Spain) Mahindra Motard Aspar (Spain) Aspar Mahindra Moto3 (Spain) Mahindra MRW Aspar Team	Mahindra	Mahindra MGP3O	6	(Spain) María Herrera	16–17
(Spain) Mahindra Motard Aspar (Spain) Aspar Mahindra Moto3 (Spain) Mahindra MRW Aspar Team	Mahindra	Mahindra MGP3O	31	(Spain) Raúl Fernández	4
(Spain) Mahindra Motard Aspar (Spain) Aspar Mahindra Moto3 (Spain) Mahindra MRW Aspar Team	Mahindra	Mahindra MGP3O	31	(Spain) Raúl Fernández	8–9
(Spain) Mahindra Motard Aspar (Spain) Aspar Mahindra Moto3 (Spain) Mahindra MRW Aspar Team	Mahindra	Mahindra MGP3O	48	(Italy) Lorenzo Dalla Porta	All
(Spain) Mahindra Motard Aspar (Spain) Aspar Mahindra Moto3 (Spain) Mahindra MRW Aspar Team	Mahindra	Mahindra MGP3O	75	(Spain) Albert Arenas	1–6, 10–15, 18
(Malaysia) SIC Racing Team (Malaysia) Petronas Sprinta Racing	Honda	Honda NSF250RW	7	(Malaysia) Adam Norrodin	All
(Malaysia) SIC Racing Team (Malaysia) Petronas Sprinta Racing	Honda	Honda NSF250RW	9	(Malaysia) Kasma Daniel	17
(Malaysia) SIC Racing Team (Malaysia) Petronas Sprinta Racing	Honda	Honda NSF250RW	71	(Japan) Ayumu Sasaki	All
(Italy) Sky Racing Team VR46 (Italy) Sky Junior Team VR46 Academy	KTM	KTM RC250GP	8	(Italy) Nicolò Bulega	All
(Italy) Sky Racing Team VR46 (Italy) Sky Junior Team VR46 Academy	KTM	KTM RC250GP	10	(Italy) Dennis Foggia	14, 18
(Italy) Sky Racing Team VR46 (Italy) Sky Junior Team VR46 Academy	KTM	KTM RC250GP	16	(Italy) Andrea Migno	All
(Mexico) Motomex Team Moto3 (United Arab Emirates) Platinum Bay Real Estate	KTM	KTM RC250GP	10	(Italy) Dennis Foggia	10
(Mexico) Motomex Team Moto3 (United Arab Emirates) Platinum Bay Real Estate	KTM	KTM RC250GP	15	(Spain) Jaume Masiá	11–13
(Mexico) Motomex Team Moto3 (United Arab Emirates) Platinum Bay Real Estate	KTM	KTM RC250GP	18	(Mexico) Gabriel Martínez	3, 10–11
(Mexico) Motomex Team Moto3 (United Arab Emirates) Platinum Bay Real Estate	KTM	KTM RC250GP	40	(South Africa) Darryn Binder	1–9, 14–18
(Mexico) Motomex Team Moto3 (United Arab Emirates) Platinum Bay Real Estate	KTM	KTM RC250GP	42	(Spain) Marcos Ramírez	All
(Luxembourg) Leopard Racing	Honda	Honda NSF250RW	11	(Belgium) Livio Loi	1–13, 15–18
(Luxembourg) Leopard Racing	Honda	Honda NSF250RW	36	(Spain) Joan Mir	All
(Luxembourg) Leopard Racing	Honda	Honda NSF250RW	37	(Spain) Aaron Polanco	14
(France) CIP	Mahindra	Mahindra MGP3O	12	(Italy) Marco Bezzecchi	All
(France) CIP	Mahindra	Mahindra MGP3O	96	(Italy) Manuel Pagliani	All
(Austria) Motorsport Kofler E.U.	KTM	KTM RC250GP	13	(Austria) Maximilian Kofler	11
(Italy) Sic58 Squadra Corse	Honda	Honda NSF250RW	14	(Italy) Tony Arbolino	All
(Italy) Sic58 Squadra Corse	Honda	Honda NSF250RW	24	(Japan) Tatsuki Suzuki	All
(United Kingdom) British Talent Team	Honda	Honda NSF250RW	17	(United Kingdom) John McPhee	All
(Spain) RBA Boé Racing Team	KTM	KTM RC250GP	19	(Argentina) Gabriel Rodrigo	1–5, 7–18
(Spain) RBA Boé Racing Team	KTM	KTM RC250GP	58	(Spain) Juan Francisco Guevara	All
(Italy) Del Conca Gresini Moto3	Honda	Honda NSF250RW	21	(Italy) Fabio Di Giannantonio	All
(Italy) Del Conca Gresini Moto3	Honda	Honda NSF250RW	88	(Spain) Jorge Martín	All
(Finland) Red Bull KTM Ajo	KTM	KTM RC250GP	23	(Italy) Niccolò Antonelli	1–8, 10–18
(Finland) Red Bull KTM Ajo	KTM	KTM RC250GP	52	(United Kingdom) Danny Kent	5
(Finland) Red Bull KTM Ajo	KTM	KTM RC250GP	52	(United Kingdom) Danny Kent	9
(Finland) Red Bull KTM Ajo	KTM	KTM RC250GP	64	(Netherlands) Bo Bendsneyder	All
(Japan) Honda Team Asia (Japan) Asia Talent Team	Honda	Honda NSF250RW	27	(Japan) Kaito Toba	All
(Japan) Honda Team Asia (Japan) Asia Talent Team	Honda	Honda NSF250RW	39	(Japan) Kazuki Masaki	18
(Japan) Honda Team Asia (Japan) Asia Talent Team	Honda	Honda NSF250RW	41	(Thailand) Nakarin Atiratphuvapat	All
(Netherlands) Lamotec Lagemaat Racing	KTM	KTM RC250GP	28	(Netherlands) Ryan van de Lagemaat	8
(Italy) 3570-MTA	Mahindra	Mahindra MGP3O	30	(Italy) Edoardo Sintoni	6
(Spain) Estrella Galicia 0,0	Honda	Honda NSF250RW	33	(Italy) Enea Bastianini	All
(Spain) Estrella Galicia 0,0	Honda	Honda NSF250RW	44	(Spain) Arón Canet	All
(United Kingdom) City Lifting RS Racing	KTM	KTM RC250GP	47	(United Kingdom) Jake Archer	12
(United Kingdom) City Lifting RS Racing	KTM	KTM RC250GP	69	(United Kingdom) Tom Booth-Amos	12
(Italy) Althea Racing	KTM	KTM RC250GP	51	(Italy) Kevin Zannoni	13
(Italy) Minimoto Portomaggiore	Mahindra	Mahindra MGP3O	57	(San Marino) Alex Fabbri	13
(Spain) Reale Avintia Academy	KTM	KTM RC250GP	63	(Spain) Vicente Pérez	4, 7
(Germany) Südmetall Schedl GP Racing	KTM	KTM RC250GP	65	(Germany) Philipp Öttl	All
(Australia) Cube Racing	KTM	KTM RC250GP	70	(Australia) Tom Toparis	15–16
(Germany) Freudenberg Racing Team	KTM	KTM RC250GP	77	(Germany) Tim Georgi	9–10
(Spain) 42 Motorsport	KTM	KTM RC250GP	81	(Spain) Aleix Viu	7

Key
Regular rider
Wildcard rider
Replacement rider

=== Team changes ===
- Paolo Simoncelli's team Sic58 Squadra Corse made their Moto3 debut, fielding two Honda NSF250RWs for Tony Arbolino and Tatsuki Suzuki.
- 3570 Team Italia left Moto3 for the Supersport 300 World Championship.
- After spending the previous season in Moto3, RW Racing GP switched to Moto2.
- AGR Team fielded one bike in Moto3, after spending the previous season in Moto2 with two bikes.
- After entering the 2016 season with three bikes, both Leopard Racing and Sky Racing Team VR46 reverted to two bikes in 2017.
- After spending the previous season with Mahindra, Platinum Bay Real Estate changed bikes to KTM.
- Ongetta-Rivacold changed their name to Snipers Team, with Marinelli Rivacold as their main sponsor.

=== Rider changes ===
- After spending two seasons as a replacement rider, Lorenzo Dalla Porta has made his full season debut with Aspar Mahindra Moto3, filling in the seat vacated by Francesco Bagnaia who moved up to Moto2.
- Romano Fenati, who was fired from Valentino Rossi's team Sky Racing Team VR46 midway through last season due to behavioral issues, landed a ride with Snipers Team for the 2017 season.
- Niccolò Antonelli left Ongetta-Rivacold (now called Snipers Team) to join Red Bull KTM Ajo, replacing Brad Binder who moved up to Moto2.
- Enea Bastianini moved to Estrella Galicia 0,0, filling in the seat vacated by Jorge Navarro who moves up to Moto2, with Jorge Martín replacing Bastianini in Gresini Racing Moto3.
- John McPhee moved to a brand new UK-based team backed by Dorna, GB Team with Jakub Kornfeil replacing him at Peugeot MC Saxoprint.
- María Herrera has moved to AGR Team, who decided to field one bike in Moto3. Herrera previously rode for her own team in 2016 after taking over the assets of Team Laglisse.
- Tony Arbolino has made his Moto3 debut with the new Moto3 team Sic58 Squadra Corse, having rode for the team in 2016 FIM CEV Moto3 Junior World Championship.
- 2016 Red Bull MotoGP Rookies Cup Champion, Ayumu Sasaki made his Moto3 debut with SIC Racing Team, filling the seat vacated by Jakub Kornfeil.
- After spending the previous season as a replacement rider for Peugeot MC Saxoprint, Albert Arenas made his full season debut with Aspar Mahindra Moto3, filling the seat vacated by Jorge Martín.
- Tatsuki Suzuki moved to the new team Sic58 Squadra Corse, with both Marco Bezzecchi and Manuel Pagliani made their Moto3 full season debut, filling in the two seats vacated by Suzuki and Fabio Spiranelli at CIP-Unicom Starker.
- Patrik Pulkkinen made his Moto3 debut, joining Peugeot MC Saxoprint.
- Livio Loi moved to Leopard Racing, filling in the seat vacated by both Fabio Quartararo and Andrea Locatelli who moved up to Moto2.
- Both Kaito Toba and Nakarin Atiratphuvapat set to make their Moto3 debut with Honda Team Asia, being promoted from Asia Talent Team Academy after Hiroki Ono left the team and Khairul Idham Pawi got promoted to Moto2.
- Enzo Boulom, who was on the provisional entry list as Wildcard & Replacement Rider, withdrew from the championship.

==== Mid-season changes ====
- Danny Kent returned to Moto3 after leaving Kiefer Racing in Moto2. After joining Red Bull KTM Ajo as a wildcard at the French GP, at Germany, Kent also replaced Niccolò Antonelli at the same team.
- Darryn Binder was replaced by Dennis Foggia at the Czech GP. Jaume Masiá replaced him for 3 rounds.
- AGR Team folded its operations in both Moto2 and Moto3 following the Aragon GP due to financial issues coupled with poor performance throughout the 2017 season. For the Australian and Malaysian rounds, María Herrera replaced Albert Arenas at the Aspar team. At the Valencia GP, Arenas returned.

== Results and standings ==
=== Grands Prix ===
Round	Grand Prix	Pole position	Fastest lap	Winning rider	Winning team	Winning constructor	Report
1	Qatar motorcycle Grand Prix	(Spain) Jorge Martín (Note: Grid formed by each rider's best time from any of the three free practice sessions held, after rain cancelled the planned qualifying session.)	(Italy) Fabio Di Giannantonio	(Spain) Joan Mir	(Luxembourg) Leopard Racing	(Japan) Honda	Report
2	(Argentina) Argentine Republic motorcycle Grand Prix	(United Kingdom) John McPhee	(Italy) Romano Fenati	(Spain) Joan Mir	(Luxembourg) Leopard Racing	(Japan) Honda	Report
3	(United States) Motorcycle Grand Prix of the Americas	(Spain) Arón Canet	(Spain) Arón Canet	(Italy) Romano Fenati	(Italy) Marinelli Rivacold Snipers	(Japan) Honda	Report
4	(Spain) Spanish motorcycle Grand Prix	(Spain) Jorge Martín	(Italy) Andrea Migno	(Spain) Arón Canet	(Spain) Estrella Galicia 0,0	(Japan) Honda	Report
5	(France) French motorcycle Grand Prix	(Spain) Jorge Martín	(Spain) Joan Mir	(Spain) Joan Mir	(Luxembourg) Leopard Racing	(Japan) Honda	Report
6	(Italy) Italian motorcycle Grand Prix	(Spain) Jorge Martín (Note: Jorge Martín, who set the fastest time in qualifying, was given a 12-place grid penalty for a riding infringement during free practice. John McPhee started the race from pole position, although Martín was still credited with pole position.)	(Spain) Arón Canet	(Italy) Andrea Migno	(Italy) Sky Racing Team VR46	(Austria) KTM	Report
7	(Catalonia) Catalan motorcycle Grand Prix	(Spain) Jorge Martín	(Spain) Jorge Martín	(Spain) Joan Mir	(Luxembourg) Leopard Racing	(Japan) Honda	Report
8	(Netherlands) Dutch TT	(Spain) Jorge Martín	(Spain) Arón Canet	(Spain) Arón Canet	(Spain) Estrella Galicia 0,0	(Japan) Honda	Report
9	(Germany) German motorcycle Grand Prix	(Spain) Arón Canet	(Spain) Joan Mir (Note: Romano Fenati and Joan Mir both set the fastest lap time of 1:27.340 during the race. Per the championship's sporting regulations, the second fastest time by each rider was taken into consideration, and Mir was credited with fastest lap.)	(Spain) Joan Mir	(Luxembourg) Leopard Racing	(Japan) Honda	Report
10	Czech Republic motorcycle Grand Prix	(Argentina) Gabriel Rodrigo	(Spain) Joan Mir	(Spain) Joan Mir	(Luxembourg) Leopard Racing	(Japan) Honda	Report
11	(Austria) Austrian motorcycle Grand Prix	(Argentina) Gabriel Rodrigo	(Spain) Jaume Masiá	(Spain) Joan Mir	(Luxembourg) Leopard Racing	(Japan) Honda	Report
12	(United Kingdom) British motorcycle Grand Prix	(Italy) Romano Fenati	(Spain) Jorge Martín	(Spain) Arón Canet	(Spain) Estrella Galicia 0,0	(Japan) Honda	Report
13	San Marino and Rimini Riviera motorcycle Grand Prix	(Italy) Enea Bastianini (Note: Enea Bastianini, who set the fastest time in qualifying, was given a 3-place grid penalty. Jorge Martín started the race from pole position, although Bastianini was still credited with pole position.)	(Italy) Romano Fenati	(Italy) Romano Fenati	(Italy) Marinelli Rivacold Snipers	(Japan) Honda	Report
14	Aragon motorcycle Grand Prix	(Spain) Jorge Martín	(Italy) Fabio Di Giannantonio	(Spain) Joan Mir	(Luxembourg) Leopard Racing	(Japan) Honda	Report
15	(Japan) Japanese motorcycle Grand Prix	(Italy) Nicolò Bulega	(Italy) Romano Fenati	(Italy) Romano Fenati	(Italy) Marinelli Rivacold Snipers	(Japan) Honda	Report
16	(Australia) Australian motorcycle Grand Prix	(Spain) Jorge Martín	(Argentina) Gabriel Rodrigo	(Spain) Joan Mir	(Luxembourg) Leopard Racing	(Japan) Honda	Report
17	(Malaysia) Malaysian motorcycle Grand Prix	(Spain) Joan Mir	(Malaysia) Adam Norrodin	(Spain) Joan Mir	(Luxembourg) Leopard Racing	(Japan) Honda	Report
18	Valencian Community motorcycle Grand Prix	(Spain) Jorge Martín	(Spain) Marcos Ramírez	(Spain) Jorge Martín	(Italy) Del Conca Gresini Moto3	(Japan) Honda	Report

=== Riders' standings ===
Scoring system

Points were awarded to the top fifteen finishers. A rider had to finish the race to earn points.

Position	**1st**	**2nd**	**3rd**	**4th**	**5th**	**6th**	**7th**	**8th**	**9th**	**10th**	**11th**	**12th**	**13th**	**14th**	**15th**
Points	25	20	16	13	11	10	9	8	7	6	5	4	3	2	1

Pos	Rider	Bike	QAT (Qatar)	ARG (Argentina)	AME (United States)	SPA (Spain)	FRA (France)	ITA (Italy)	CAT (Catalonia)	NED (Netherlands)	GER (Germany)	CZE (Czech Republic)	AUT (Austria)	GBR (United Kingdom)	RSM (San Marino)	ARA (Aragon)	JPN (Japan)	AUS (Australia)	MAL (Malaysia)	VAL (Valencian Community)	Pts
1	(Spain) Joan Mir	Honda	1	1	8	3	1	7	1	9	1	1	1	5	2	1	17	1	**1**	2	341
2	(Italy) Romano Fenati	Honda	5	7	1	2	Ret	13	2	2	2	2	13	**7**	1	10	1	6	7	4	248
3	(Spain) Arón Canet	Honda	4	11	**Ret**	1	2	5	5	1	**Ret**	3	5	1	Ret	5	5	NC	8	9	199
4	(Spain) Jorge Martín	Honda	**3**	3	2	**9**	**Ret**	**15**	**3**	**4**	DNS	DNS	3	3	Ret	**4**	15	**3**	2	**1**	196
5	(Italy) Fabio Di Giannantonio	Honda	8	Ret	3	5	3	2	7	Ret	11	21	6	10	3	2	7	Ret	9	Ret	153
6	(Italy) Enea Bastianini	Honda	16	27	4	8	6	11	4	Ret	6	17	10	2	**14**	3	16	5	3	5	141
7	(United Kingdom) John McPhee	Honda	2	**2**	7	Ret	12	6	12	3	Ret	6	Ret	13	Ret	6	10	Ret	5	8	131
8	(Spain) Marcos Ramírez	KTM	9	13	16	4	4	9	6	6	3	7	12	Ret	12	7	14	21	17	3	123
9	(Italy) Andrea Migno	KTM	6	5	12	6	8	1	8	14	16	11	21	8	9	11	13	14	6	16	118
10	(Germany) Philipp Öttl	KTM	Ret	4	9	DNS	21	14	13	11	5	13	2	9	4	9	6	13	16	15	105
11	(Spain) Juan Francisco Guevara	KTM	Ret	9	6	10	5	3	17	12	12	5	14	Ret	Ret	12	Ret	23	13	6	88
12	(Italy) Nicolò Bulega	KTM	14	16	5	7	17	10	9	10	4	23	11	20	5	14	**12**	11	Ret	DNS	81
13	(Belgium) Livio Loi	Honda	12	6	15	16	16	23	25	21	7	27	4	6	DNS		19	2	4	27	80
14	(Japan) Tatsuki Suzuki	Honda	15	8	Ret	Ret	Ret	Ret	10	8	9	8	Ret	11	Ret	13	4	9	Ret	11	71
15	(Netherlands) Bo Bendsneyder	KTM	26	23	DNS	11	9	12	15	Ret	8	4	Ret	Ret	6	17	9	16	10	12	65
16	(Argentina) Gabriel Rodrigo	KTM	DNS	Ret	11	13	DNS		Ret	7	Ret	**26**	**7**	4	Ret	Ret	Ret	4	14	Ret	54
17	(Malaysia) Adam Norrodin	Honda	10	17	19	Ret	DNS	18	18	Ret	13	9	8	12	Ret	15	Ret	8	11	17	42
18	(Italy) Niccolò Antonelli	KTM	7	Ret	14	22	Ret	16	11	DNS		24	Ret	16	Ret	18	2	Ret	Ret	14	38
19	(South Africa) Darryn Binder	KTM	13	12	10	20	Ret	4	Ret	13	10					22	20	24	Ret	DNS	35
20	(Japan) Ayumu Sasaki	Honda	11	20	18	15	19	8	16	15	17	15	18	18	Ret	16	Ret	7	12	13	32
21	(France) Jules Danilo	Honda	17	22	13	12	7	Ret	Ret	5	14	Ret	16	22	Ret	20	18	Ret	Ret	19	29
22	(Czech Republic) Jakub Kornfeil	Peugeot	20	18	23	18	11	20	22	17	18	20	20	23	7	25	8	12	21	18	26
23	(Italy) Marco Bezzecchi	Mahindra	25	19	17	Ret	15	17	14	16	15	22	Ret	19	Ret	19	3	Ret	19	28	20
24	(Italy) Dennis Foggia	KTM										14				8				7	19
25	(Thailand) Nakarin Atiratphuvapat	Honda	18	24	24	21	13	24	21	18	23	10	Ret	14	Ret	Ret	11	17	18	21	16
26	(Spain) Albert Arenas	Mahindra	Ret	25	21	14	Ret	Ret				12	Ret	27	8	27	DNS			23	14
27	(Spain) Jaume Masiá	KTM											9	Ret	10	21					13
28	(Italy) Lorenzo Dalla Porta	Mahindra	23	Ret	26	19	14	19	19	Ret	19	19	Ret	17	15	Ret	Ret	10	Ret	20	9
29	(Italy) Manuel Pagliani	Mahindra	22	21	25	27	18	22	20	Ret	20	25	19	15	11	23	Ret	15	15	22	8
30	(Japan) Kaito Toba	Honda	19	10	Ret	17	Ret	25	23	19	21	29	15	Ret	Ret	28	21	20	20	24	7
31	(Japan) Kazuki Masaki	Honda																		10	6
32	(United Kingdom) Danny Kent	KTM					10				Ret										6
33	(San Marino) Alex Fabbri	Mahindra													13						3
34	(Italy) Tony Arbolino	Honda	24	14	20	23	22	21	24	Ret	Ret	16	17	25	Ret	26	23	18	22	25	2
35	(Spain) María Herrera	KTM	21	15	22	24	20	26	26	20	26	Ret	22	26	DNS	DNS				26	1
35	(Spain) María Herrera	Mahindra																19	24		1
36	(Germany) Tim Georgi	KTM									24	18									0
37	(United Kingdom) Tom Booth-Amos	KTM												21							0
38	(Finland) Patrik Pulkkinen	Peugeot	Ret	26	27	26	23	27	27	22	25	30	24	24	Ret	29	22	Ret	23	29	0
39	(Australia) Tom Toparis	KTM															24	22			0
40	(Spain) Raúl Fernández	Mahindra				25				Ret	22										0
41	(Austria) Maximilian Kofler	KTM											23								0
42	(Spain) Aaron Polanco	Honda														24					0
43	(Mexico) Gabriel Martínez	KTM			28							28	Ret								0
44	(Spain) Aleix Viu	KTM							28												0
	(Spain) Vicente Pérez	KTM				Ret			Ret												0
	(Italy) Edoardo Sintoni	Mahindra						Ret													0
	(Netherlands) Ryan van de Lagemaat	KTM								Ret											0
	(United Kingdom) Jake Archer	KTM												Ret							0
	(Italy) Kevin Zannoni	KTM													Ret						0
	(Malaysia) Kasma Daniel	Honda																	Ret		0
Pos	Rider	Bike	QAT (Qatar)	ARG (Argentina)	AME (United States)	SPA (Spain)	FRA (France)	ITA (Italy)	CAT (Catalonia)	NED (Netherlands)	GER (Germany)	CZE (Czech Republic)	AUT (Austria)	GBR (United Kingdom)	RSM (San Marino)	ARA (Aragon)	JPN (Japan)	AUS (Australia)	MAL (Malaysia)	VAL (Valencian Community)	Pts

Colour	Result
Gold	Winner
Silver	Second place
Bronze	Third place
Green	Points classification
Blue	Non-points classification
Blue	Non-classified finish (NC)
Purple	Retired, not classified (Ret)
Red	Did not qualify (DNQ)
Red	Did not pre-qualify (DNPQ)
Black	Disqualified (DSQ)
White	Did not start (DNS)
White	Withdrew (WD)
White	Race cancelled (C)
Blank	Did not practice (DNP)
Blank	Did not arrive (DNA)
Blank	Excluded (EX)

**Bold** – Pole
Italics – Fastest Lap
Light blue – Rookie

=== Constructors' standings ===
Each constructor received the same number of points as their best placed rider in each race.

Pos	Constructor	QAT (Qatar)	ARG (Argentina)	AME (United States)	SPA (Spain)	FRA (France)	ITA (Italy)	CAT (Catalonia)	NED (Netherlands)	GER (Germany)	CZE (Czech Republic)	AUT (Austria)	GBR (United Kingdom)	RSM (San Marino)	ARA (Aragon)	JPN (Japan)	AUS (Australia)	MAL (Malaysia)	VAL (Valencian Community)	Pts
1	(Japan) Honda	1	1	1	1	1	2	1	1	1	1	1	1	1	1	1	1	1	1	445
2	(Austria) KTM	6	4	5	4	4	1	6	6	3	4	2	4	4	7	2	4	6	3	248
3	(India) Mahindra	22	19	17	14	14	17	14	16	15	12	19	15	8	19	3	10	15	20	43
4	(France) Peugeot	20	18	23	18	11	20	22	17	18	20	20	23	7	25	8	12	21	18	26
Pos	Constructor	QAT (Qatar)	ARG (Argentina)	AME (United States)	SPA (Spain)	FRA (France)	ITA (Italy)	CAT (Catalonia)	NED (Netherlands)	GER (Germany)	CZE (Czech Republic)	AUT (Austria)	GBR (United Kingdom)	RSM (San Marino)	ARA (Aragon)	JPN (Japan)	AUS (Australia)	MAL (Malaysia)	VAL (Valencian Community)	Pts
