= List of Grand Prix motorcycle racers: F =

Name	Seasons	World Championships	MotoGP Wins	500cc Wins	350cc Wins	Moto2 Wins	250cc Wins	Moto3 Wins	125cc Wins	80cc Wins	50cc Wins	MotoE Wins
(San Marino) Alex Fabbri	2016-2017	0	0	0	0	0	0	0	0	0	0	0
(Italy) Michel Fabrizio	2002, 2004, 2006-2007, 2009, 2014	0	0	0	0	0	0	0	0	0	0	0
(Spain) Héctor Faubel	2000-2012	0	0	0	0	0	0	0	8	0	0	0
(Indonesia) Andi Farid Izdihar	2019-2021	0	0	0	0	0	0	0	0	0	0	0
(Italy) Filippo Farioli	2022-2024	0	0	0	0	0	0	0	0	0	0	0
(Germany) Rudi Felgenheier	1952	0	0	0	0	0	1	0	0	0	0	0
(Spain) Augusto Fernández	2017-2025	1 Moto2 - 2022	0	0	0	7	0	0	0	0	0	0
(Spain) Adrián Fernández	2020-	0	0	0	0	0	0	1	0	0	0	0
(Spain) Eric Fernández	2025	0	0	0	0	0	0	0	0	0	0	0
(France) Patrick Fernandez	1974-1985	0	0	0	2	0	1	0	0	0	0	0
(Spain) Raúl Fernández	2016-	0	2	0	0	8	0	2	0	0	0	0
(Spain) Alberto Ferrández	2025-	0	0	0	0	0	0	1	0	0	0	0
(Italy) Matteo Ferrari	2013-2015, 2019-2025	1 MotoE - 2019	0	0	0	0	0	0	0	0	0	13
(Italy) Virginio Ferrari	1975-1989	0	0	2	0	0	0	0	0	0	0	0
(Italy) Romolo Ferri	1950-1952, 1954-1958, 1964	0	0	0	0	0	0	0	1	0	0	0
(Australia) Jack Findlay	1958-1978	0	0	3	0	0	0	0	0	0	0	0
(Italy) Alessio Finello	2016-2018, 2022-2025	0	0	0	0	0	0	0	0	0	0	0
(Italy) Dennis Foggia	2017-	0	0	0	0	0	0	10	0	0	0	0
(Germany) Jonas Folger	2008-2017, 2019, 2023	0	0	0	0	3	0	0	1	0	0	0
(France) Marc Fontan	1978, 1981-1983	0	0	0	0	0	0	0	0	0	0	0
(France) Kenny Foray	2019	0	0	0	0	0	0	0	0	0	0	0
(Spain) Xavi Forés	2001, 2010-2011, 2016, 2022	0	0	0	0	0	0	0	0	0	0	0
(United Kingdom) Bob Foster	1949-1951	1; 350cc - 1950	0	0	3	0	0	0	0	0	0	0
(United Kingdom) Sid Franklen	1951-1953	0	0	0	0	0	0	0	0	0	0	0
(United Kingdom) Ted Frend	1949-1950, 1953-1954	0	0	0	0	0	0	0	0	0	0	0
(United Kingdom) Freddie Frith	1949	1; 350cc - 1949	0	0	5	0	0	0	0	0	0	0
(Switzerland) Michel Frutschi	1977, 1979-1983	0	0	1	0	0	0	0	0	0	0	0
(United Kingdom) Frank Fry	1949, 1951	0	0	0	0	0	0	0	0	0	0	0
(Japan) Yuto Fukushima	2018	0	0	0	0	0	0	0	0	0	0	0
(Japan) Taiyo Furusato	2022-	0	0	0	0	0	0	1	0	0	0	0
(Italy) Raffaele Fusco	2025	0	0	0	0	0	0	0	0	0	0	0
