= Alex Fabbri =

Sammarinese motorcycle racer

- Nationality: Sammarinese
- Born: 18 August 1998 (age 28); San Marino
- Current team: Minimoto Portomaggiore
- Bike number: 7
Motorcycle racing career statistics
Moto3 World Championship
Active years	2016–2017
Manufacturers	Mahindra
2017 championship position	33rd (3 pts)
Starts / Wins / Podiums / Poles / F. laps / Points; 2 / 0 / 0 / 0 / 0 / 3

Alex Fabbri (born 18 August 1998) is a Sammarinese motorcycle racer.

== Career statistics ==
=== Grand Prix motorcycle racing ===
==== By season ====
Season	Class	Motorcycle	Team	Race	Win	Podium	Pole	FLap	Pts	Plcd
2016	Moto3	Mahindra	Minimoto Portomaggiore	1	0	0	0	0	0	NC
2017	Moto3	Mahindra	Minimoto Portomaggiore	1	0	0	0	0	3	33rd
Total				2	0	0	0	0	3	

* Season still in progress.

==== Races by year ====
Year	Class	Bike	1	2	3	4	5	6	7	8	9	10	11	12	13	14	15	16	17	18	Pos.	Pts
2016	Moto3	Mahindra	QAT	ARG	AME	SPA	FRA	ITA	CAT	NED	GER	AUT	CZE	GBR	RSM; Ret	ARA	JPN	AUS	MAL	VAL	NC	0
2017	Moto3	Mahindra	QAT	ARG	AME	SPA	FRA	ITA	CAT	NED	GER	CZE	AUT	GBR	RSM; 13	ARA	JPN	AUS	MAL	VAL	33rd	3

* Season still in progress.
