= Rei Sato (motorcyclist) =

Japanese motorcycle racer

- Nationality: Japanese
- Born: 5 March 2000 (age 26)
- Current team: 41 Planning IodaRacing Japan
- Bike number: 41
Motorcycle racing career statistics
Moto3 World Championship
Active years	2016
Manufacturers	Honda
2016 championship position	NC (0 pts)
Starts / Wins / Podiums / Poles / F. laps / Points; 0 / 0 / 0 / 0 / 0 / 0

Rei Sato (佐藤 励, Satō Rei; born 5 March 2000) is a Japanese motorcycle racer. In 2016, he competed aboard a Honda NSF250R in the MFJ All Japan Road Race J-GP3 Championship.

== Career statistics ==
=== Grand Prix motorcycle racing ===
==== By season ====
Season	Class	Motorcycle	Team	Race	Win	Podium	Pole	FLap	Pts	Plcd
2016	Moto3	Honda	41 Planning IodaRacing Japan	0	0	0	0	0	0	NC
Total				0	0	0	0	0	0	

==== Races by year ====
Year	Class	Bike	1	2	3	4	5	6	7	8	9	10	11	12	13	14	15	16	17	18	Pos.	Pts
2016	Moto3	Honda	QAT	ARG	AME	SPA	FRA	ITA	CAT	NED	GER	AUT	CZE	GBR	RSM	ARA	JPN; DNS	AUS	MAL	VAL	NC	0
