= Rei Sato =

Rei Sato may refer to:

- Rei Sato (badminton) (佐藤 黎, born 1990), Japanese badminton player
- Rei Sato (motorcyclist) (佐藤 励, born 2000), Japanese motorcycle racer
