= Gabriel Rodrigo =

Argentine motorcycle racer

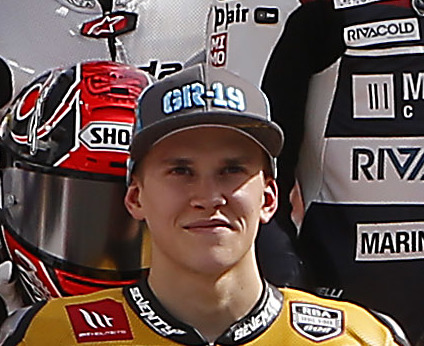
- Rodrigo in 2018
- Nationality: Argentine
- Born: 12 October 1996 (age 30); Barcelona, Spain
- Website: gabrirodrigo.com
Motorcycle racing career statistics
Moto2 World Championship
Active years	2022
Manufacturers	Kalex
2022 championship position	28th (6 pts)
Starts / Wins / Podiums / Poles / F. laps / Points; 7 / 0 / 0 / 0 / 0 / 6
Moto3 World Championship
Active years	2014–2021
Manufacturers	KTM, Husqvarna, Honda
Championships	0
2021 championship position	19th (60 pts)
Starts / Wins / Podiums / Poles / F. laps / Points; 116 / 0 / 2 / 6 / 5 / 408

Gabriel Rodrigo Castillo (born 12 October 1996) is a Spanish-born Argentine former motorcycle racer. In 2020, he won the Moto3 Virtual GP race organized by Dorna Sports.

== Career statistics ==
=== FIM CEV Moto3 Junior World Championship ===
==== Races by year ====
(key) (Races in bold indicate pole position; races in italics indicate fastest lap)

Year	Bike	1	2	3	4	5	6	7	8	9	10	11	Pos	Pts
2013	KTM	CAT1; 3	CAT2; Ret	ARA; 10	ALB1; Ret	ALB2; 18	NAV; EX	VAL1; 13	VAL1; 9	JER; 10			11th	38
2014	KTM	JER1; 3	JER2; 6	**LMS**; 2	ARA; 8	CAT1; 5	CAT2; 4	ALB; Ret	NAV; 18	ALG; 13	**VAL1**; Ret	**VAL1**; 2	4th	101

=== Grand Prix motorcycle racing ===
==== By season ====
Season	Class	Motorcycle	Team	Race	Win	Podium	Pole	FLap	Pts	Plcd
2014	Moto3	KTM	RBA Racing Team	6	0	0	0	0	0	NC
2014	Moto3	Husqvarna	Avant Tecno Husqvarna Ajo	1	0	0	0	0	0	NC
2015	Moto3	KTM	RBA Racing Team	17	0	0	0	0	0	NC
2016	Moto3	KTM	RBA Racing Team	18	0	0	0	0	31	24th
2017	Moto3	KTM	RBA BOE Racing Team	15	0	0	2	1	54	16th
2018	Moto3	KTM	RBA BOE Skull Rider	17	0	1	1	1	116	7th
2019	Moto3	Honda	Kömmerling Gresini Moto3	14	0	0	1	1	67	18th
2020	Moto3	Honda	Kömmerling Gresini Moto3	15	0	0	1	1	80	13th
2021	Moto3	Honda	Indonesian Racing Team Gresini Moto3	13	0	1	1	1	60	19th
2022	Moto2	Kalex	Pertamina Mandalika SAG Team	7	0	0	0	0	6	28th
Total				**123**	**0**	**2**	**6**	**5**	**414**	

==== By class ====
Class	Seasons	1st GP	1st Pod	Race	Win	Podiums	Pole	FLap	Pts	WChmp
Moto3	2014–2021	2014 Spain	2018 Catalunya	116	0	2	6	5	408	0
Moto2	2022	2022 Qatar		7	0	0	0	0	6	0
Total	2014–present			**123**	**0**	**2**	**6**	**5**	**414**	**0**

==== Races by year ====
(key) (Races in bold indicate pole position, races in italics indicate fastest lap)

Year	Class	Bike	1	2	3	4	5	6	7	8	9	10	11	12	13	14	15	16	17	18	19	20	Pos	Pts
2014	Moto3	KTM	QAT	AME	ARG	SPA; Ret	FRA	ITA	CAT; 22	NED			CZE; Ret	GBR	RSM; Ret	ARA; 20	JPN	AUS	MAL	VAL; Ret			NC	0
2014	Moto3	Husqvarna									GER; 22	INP											NC	0
2015	Moto3	KTM	QAT; 27	AME; 19	ARG; 28	SPA; Ret	FRA; Ret	ITA; Ret	CAT; Ret	NED; 25	GER; 26	INP; 31	CZE; Ret	GBR; Ret	RSM; 20	ARA; 20	JPN; 16	AUS; Ret	MAL; 25	VAL; DNS			NC	0
2016	Moto3	KTM	QAT; 19	ARG; 19	AME; 18	SPA; 13	FRA; Ret	ITA; 13	CAT; Ret	NED; Ret	GER; 13	AUT; Ret	CZE; 17	GBR; 11	RSM; Ret	ARA; 8	JPN; Ret	AUS; Ret	MAL; 7	VAL; Ret			24th	31
2017	Moto3	KTM	QAT; DNS	ARG; Ret	AME; 11	SPA; 13	FRA; DNS	ITA	CAT; Ret	NED; 7	GER; Ret	**CZE**; 26	**AUT**; 7	GBR; 4	RSM; Ret	ARA; Ret	JPN; Ret	AUS; 4	MAL; 14	VAL; Ret			16th	54
2018	Moto3	KTM	QAT; 5	ARG; 9	AME; 12	SPA; 10	FRA; Ret	ITA; 4	CAT; 3	NED; 8	GER; Ret	CZE; 5	AUT; 8	GBR; C	RSM; 4	ARA; Ret	THA; 5	**JPN**; 8	AUS; Ret	MAL	VAL; 17		7th	116
2019	Moto3	Honda	QAT; 15	ARG; 6	AME; 4	SPA; Ret	FRA; 4	ITA; Ret	**CAT**; Ret	NED; 4	GER; Ret	CZE; DNS	AUT	GBR	RSM; 6	ARA; 9	THA; DNS	JPN; Ret	AUS; Ret	MAL; Ret	VAL		18th	67
2020	Moto3	Honda	QAT; 6	SPA; 7	ANC; 5	CZE; 19	AUT; 11	**STY**; 4	RSM; 5	EMI; 12	CAT; 10	FRA; 8	ARA; Ret	TER; 14	EUR; 15	VAL; Ret	POR; 27						13th	80
2021	Moto3	Honda	QAT; 5	DOH; 13	POR; 5	SPA; Ret	FRA; Ret	ITA; 3	**CAT**; 6	GER; Ret	NED; 8	STY; 20	AUT; 20	GBR; 15	ARA; Ret	RSM; DNS	AME	EMI	ALR; DNS	VAL			19th	60
2022	Moto2	Kalex	QAT; 21	INA; 22	ARG; Ret	AME; Ret	POR; 10	SPA; 17	FRA; Ret	ITA; DNS	CAT	GER	NED	GBR	AUT	RSM	ARA	JPN	THA	AUS	MAL	VAL	28th	6
