= 2016 Moto3 World Championship =

5th running of the Moto3 World Championship

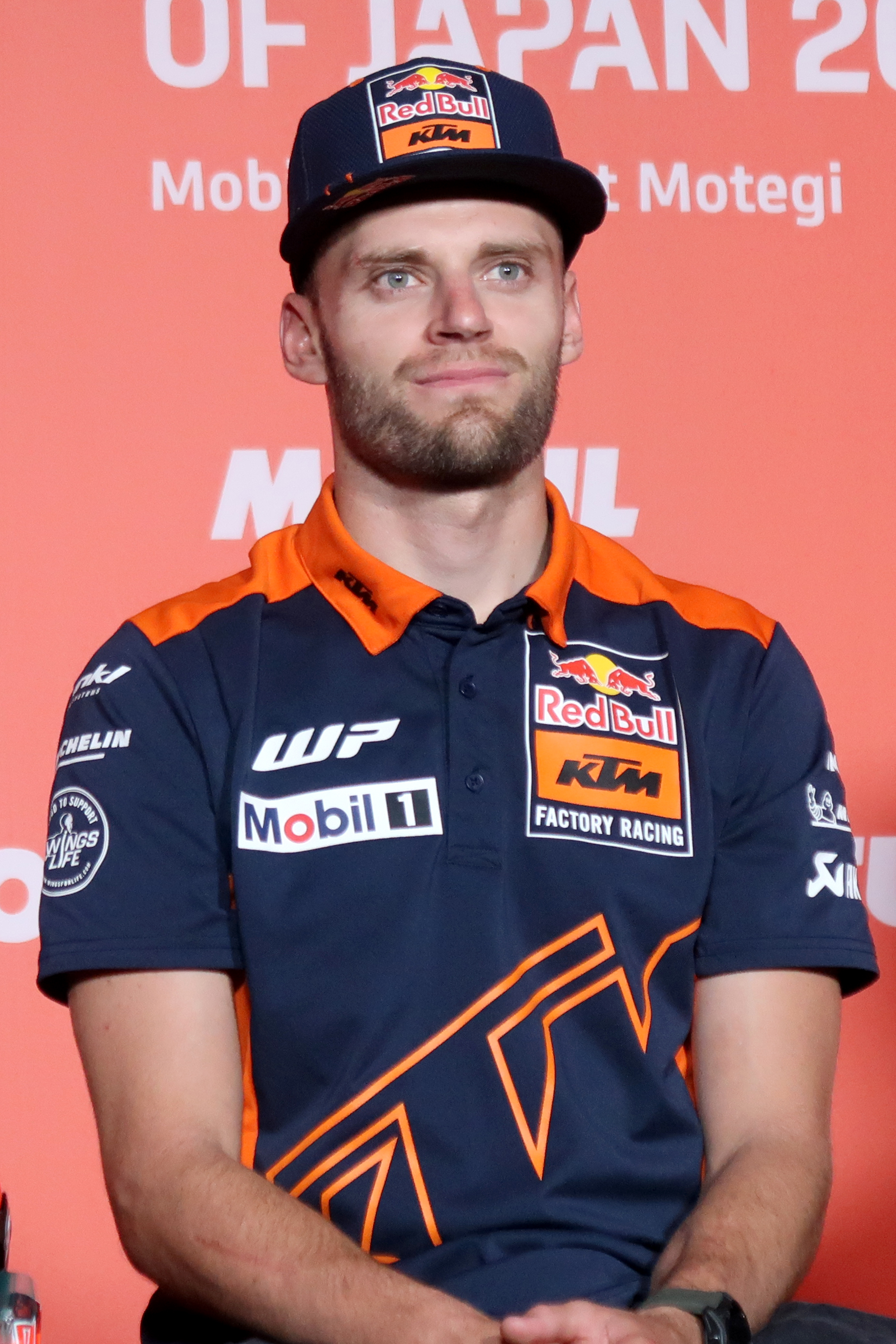
Brad Binder (pictured in 2023) was the 2016 Moto3 World Riders' Champion.

The 2016 FIM Moto3 World Championship was the lightweight class of the 68th Fédération Internationale de Motocyclisme (FIM) Road Racing World Championship season. Danny Kent was the reigning series champion but did not defend his title as he joined the series' intermediate class, Moto2.

The riders' championship title was won by Ajo Motorsport rider Brad Binder, after a second-place finish at the Aragon Grand Prix gave him an unassailable lead over his title rivals with four races remaining. Binder, who finished each of the first seven races on the podium, took the championship lead after the second race in Argentina, and took his first Grand Prix victory at the Spanish Grand Prix – starting from 35th on the grid. With four additional wins prior to Aragon, Binder was never headed in the championship thereafter to become South Africa's third world motorcycle racing champion, after Kork Ballington and Jon Ekerold. Binder took two further victories before the end of the season, in Australia and Valencia, en route to an eventual championship winning margin of 142 points over his next closest competitor. Compared to Binder's seven wins, no other rider was able to take more than two, with eight fellow riders taking at least one win during the 2016 season.

A fourth-place finish in Valencia sealed the runner-up position for Gresini Racing's Enea Bastianini. Despite missing two races through injury and a slow start to the season, Bastianini then achieved six podium finishes in nine races, including his only win of the season in Japan. Five riders were also in position to take third place at the finale; top Mahindra rider Francesco Bagnaia, Jorge Navarro and a trio of rookie riders also battling for Rookie of the Year honours, Nicolò Bulega, Joan Mir and Fabio Di Giannantonio. Bagnaia was taken out of the race by Gabriel Rodrigo, with a ninth-place finish for Navarro allowing him to take third position by five points. Both riders took two victories during the season; Navarro winning in Catalonia and Aragon, with Bagnaia doing so at Assen and Malaysia, the first wins for Mahindra at Grand Prix level. Mir and Di Giannantonio battled on-track in Valencia for the top rookie position, which ultimately went to Mir, as he finished second to Di Giannatonio's fifth position. Mir won the Austrian Grand Prix, one of two rookies to win during 2016.

Four other riders won races during the season; the other rookie winner Khairul Idham Pawi took two wet-weather victories in Argentina and Germany, becoming the first rider from Malaysia to win at World Championship level. Single race wins went to Romano Fenati in Austin, before a mid-season dismissal from Valentino Rossi's team, Niccolò Antonelli won the season-opening race in a photo-finish in Qatar, while John McPhee took his, and Peugeot's, first Grand Prix win in wet conditions at Brno. With nine wins during the campaign, KTM won their fourth Moto3 constructors' title in five years, finishing 32 points clear of Honda, with six wins. All four full-season manufacturers took at least one win.

== Changes for 2016 ==
- French oil and gas giants company Total was selected to become official fuel supplier of Moto2 and Moto3 beginning from 2016 onwards, replacing Eni after five seasons as a fuel supplier of Moto2 and Moto3.

== Calendar ==
The following Grands Prix took place in 2016.

Round	Date	Grand Prix	Circuit
1	20 March ‡	Commercial Bank Grand Prix of Qatar	Lusail International Circuit, Lusail
2	3 April	Gran Premio Motul de la República Argentina	Autódromo Termas de Río Hondo, Termas de Río Hondo
3	10 April	(United States) Red Bull Grand Prix of the Americas	Circuit of the Americas, Austin
4	24 April	(Spain) Gran Premio Red Bull de España	Circuito de Jerez, Jerez de la Frontera
5	8 May	Monster Energy Grand Prix de France	Bugatti Circuit, Le Mans
6	22 May	(Italy) Gran Premio d'Italia TIM	Mugello Circuit, Scarperia e San Piero
7	5 June	(Catalonia) Gran Premi Monster Energy de Catalunya	Circuit de Barcelona-Catalunya, Montmeló
8	26 June	(Netherlands) Motul TT Assen	TT Circuit Assen, Assen
9	17 July	(Germany) GoPro Motorrad Grand Prix Deutschland	Sachsenring, Hohenstein-Ernstthal
10	14 August	(Austria) NeroGiardini Motorrad Grand Prix von Österreich	Red Bull Ring, Spielberg
11	21 August	(Czech Republic) HJC Helmets Grand Prix České republiky	Brno Circuit, Brno
12	4 September	(United Kingdom) Octo British Grand Prix	Silverstone Circuit, Silverstone
13	11 September	Gran Premio TIM di San Marino e della Riviera di Rimini	Misano World Circuit, Misano Adriatico
14	25 September	(Aragon) Gran Premio Movistar de Aragón	MotorLand Aragón, Alcañiz
15	16 October	Motul Grand Prix of Japan	Motegi Circuit, Motegi
16	23 October	(Australia) Michelin Australian Motorcycle Grand Prix	Phillip Island Grand Prix Circuit, Phillip Island
17	30 October	Shell Malaysia Motorcycle Grand Prix	Sepang International Circuit, Sepang
18	13 November	(Valencian Community) Gran Premio Motul de la Comunitat Valenciana	Circuit Ricardo Tormo, Valencia

‡ = Night race

=== Calendar changes ===
- The Grand Prix of the Americas and the Argentine Grand Prix have swapped places, with Argentina hosting the second round, while the Grand Prix of the Americas hosts the third round.
- For the first time in the history of the Dutch TT, the races were held on a Sunday.
- The 2016 season had seen the return of the Austrian Grand Prix to the series' schedule after 19 years of absence. The last race, which had been the 1997 Austrian Grand Prix, was held at the A1-Ring, now called the Red Bull Ring.
- Having been on the calendar since 2008, the Indianapolis Grand Prix was taken off the calendar.

== Teams and riders ==
A provisional entry list was announced on 7 November 2015. All teams used Dunlop tyres.

Team	Constructor	Motorcycle	No.	Rider	Rounds
(France) CIP-Unicom Starker	Mahindra	Mahindra MGP3O	3	(Italy) Fabio Spiranelli	1–17
(France) CIP-Unicom Starker	Mahindra	Mahindra MGP3O	24	(Japan) Tatsuki Suzuki	All
(France) CIP-Unicom Starker	Mahindra	Mahindra MGP3O	99	(France) Enzo Boulom	18
(Italy) Gresini Racing Moto3	Honda	Honda NSF250RW	4	(Italy) Fabio Di Giannantonio	All
(Italy) Gresini Racing Moto3	Honda	Honda NSF250RW	33	(Italy) Enea Bastianini	1–4, 6–16, 18
(Italy) Gresini Racing Moto3	Honda	Honda NSF250RW	71	(Japan) Ayumu Sasaki	17
(Italy) Sky Racing Team VR46	KTM	KTM RC250GP	5	(Italy) Romano Fenati	1–10
(Italy) Sky Racing Team VR46	KTM	KTM RC250GP	8	(Italy) Nicolò Bulega	All
(Italy) Sky Racing Team VR46	KTM	KTM RC250GP	16	(Italy) Andrea Migno	All
(Italy) Sky Racing Team VR46	KTM	KTM RC250GP	48	(Italy) Lorenzo Dalla Porta	12–18
(Spain) MH6 Laglisse (Spain) MH6 Team	KTM	KTM RC250GP	6	(Spain) María Herrera	1–17
(Spain) MH6 Laglisse (Spain) MH6 Team	KTM	KTM RC250GP	31	(Spain) Raúl Fernández	18
(Malaysia) Drive M7 SIC Racing Team	Honda	Honda NSF250RW	7	(Malaysia) Adam Norrodin	All
(Malaysia) Drive M7 SIC Racing Team	Honda	Honda NSF250RW	84	(Czech Republic) Jakub Kornfeil	All
(Spain) Estrella Galicia 0,0	Honda	Honda NSF250RW	09	(Spain) Jorge Navarro	1–7, 9–18
(Spain) Estrella Galicia 0,0	Honda	Honda NSF250RW	44	(Spain) Arón Canet	All
(Spain) Estrella Galicia 0,0	Honda	Honda NSF250RW	48	(Italy) Lorenzo Dalla Porta	8
(Germany) Peugeot MC Saxoprint (Germany) KRM-RZT	Peugeot	Peugeot MGP3O	10	(France) Alexis Masbou	1–9
(Germany) Peugeot MC Saxoprint (Germany) KRM-RZT	Peugeot	Peugeot MGP3O	12	(Spain) Albert Arenas	10–18
(Germany) Peugeot MC Saxoprint (Germany) KRM-RZT	Peugeot	Peugeot MGP3O	17	(United Kingdom) John McPhee	1–16
(Germany) Peugeot MC Saxoprint (Germany) KRM-RZT	Peugeot	Peugeot MGP3O	38	(Malaysia) Hafiq Azmi	17
(Germany) Peugeot MC Saxoprint (Germany) KRM-RZT	Peugeot	Peugeot MGP3O	63	(Spain) Vicente Pérez	18
(Germany) Peugeot MC Saxoprint (Germany) KRM-RZT	KTM	KTM RC250GP	97	(Germany) Maximilian Kappler	9
(Netherlands) RW Racing GP	Honda	Honda NSF250RW	11	(Belgium) Livio Loi	All
(Spain) MRW Mahindra Aspar Team	Mahindra	Mahindra MGP3O	12	(Spain) Albert Arenas	4, 7
(Spain) Aspar Mahindra Team Moto3 (Spain) Pull & Bear Aspar Mahindra Team	Mahindra	Mahindra MGP3O	12	(Spain) Albert Arenas	8 (Note: Jorge Martín competed in Friday practice sessions at Assen, before being replaced by Albert Arenas.)
(Spain) Aspar Mahindra Team Moto3 (Spain) Pull & Bear Aspar Mahindra Team	Mahindra	Mahindra MGP3O	21	(Italy) Francesco Bagnaia	All
(Spain) Aspar Mahindra Team Moto3 (Spain) Pull & Bear Aspar Mahindra Team	Mahindra	Mahindra MGP3O	88	(Spain) Jorge Martín	All
(Japan) UQ & Teluru Kohara RT	Honda	TSR3 Honda	13	(Japan) Shizuka Okazaki	15
(Australia) Suus Honda	FTR Honda	FTR M316	14	(Australia) Matt Barton	16
41 Planning IodaRacing Japan	Honda	TSR3 Honda	15	(Japan) Rei Sato	15
(Mexico) Motomex Team Worldwide Race (United Arab Emirates) Platinum Bay Real Estate	Mahindra	Mahindra MGP3O	18	(Mexico) Gabriel Martínez	14
(Mexico) Motomex Team Worldwide Race (United Arab Emirates) Platinum Bay Real Estate	Mahindra	Mahindra MGP3O	22	(United Kingdom) Danny Webb	8–9
(Mexico) Motomex Team Worldwide Race (United Arab Emirates) Platinum Bay Real Estate	Mahindra	Mahindra MGP3O	40	(South Africa) Darryn Binder	All
(Mexico) Motomex Team Worldwide Race (United Arab Emirates) Platinum Bay Real Estate	Mahindra	Mahindra MGP3O	42	(Spain) Marcos Ramírez	10–18
(Mexico) Motomex Team Worldwide Race (United Arab Emirates) Platinum Bay Real Estate	Mahindra	Mahindra MGP3O	98	(Czech Republic) Karel Hanika	1–7
(Spain) RBA Racing Team	KTM	KTM RC250GP	19	(Argentina) Gabriel Rodrigo	All
(Spain) RBA Racing Team	KTM	KTM RC250GP	58	(Spain) Juan Francisco Guevara	All
(Luxembourg) Leopard Racing	KTM	KTM RC250GP	20	(France) Fabio Quartararo	All
(Luxembourg) Leopard Racing	KTM	KTM RC250GP	36	(Spain) Joan Mir	All
(Luxembourg) Leopard Racing	KTM	KTM RC250GP	55	(Italy) Andrea Locatelli	All
(Italy) Ongetta–Rivacold	Honda	Honda NSF250RW	23	(Italy) Niccolò Antonelli	All
(Italy) Ongetta–Rivacold	Honda	Honda NSF250RW	95	(France) Jules Danilo	All
(United Kingdom) GA Competition	KTM	KTM RC250GP	26	(Spain) Daniel Sáez	18
(Germany) Freudenberg Racing Team	KTM	KTM RC250GP	27	(Germany) Tim Georgi	9
(Germany) Freudenberg Racing Team	KTM	KTM RC250GP	98	(Czech Republic) Karel Hanika	11, 18
(Spain) Procercasa - 42 Motorsport	KTM	KTM RC250GP	37	(Italy) Davide Pizzoli	4–7
(Spain) Procercasa - 42 Motorsport	KTM	KTM RC250GP	99	(France) Enzo Boulom	4–5
(Finland) Red Bull KTM Ajo	KTM	KTM RC250GP	41	(South Africa) Brad Binder	All
(Finland) Red Bull KTM Ajo	KTM	KTM RC250GP	64	(Netherlands) Bo Bendsneyder	All
(Italy) 3570 Team Italia	Mahindra	Mahindra MGP3O	43	(Italy) Stefano Valtulini	All
(Italy) 3570 Team Italia	Mahindra	Mahindra MGP3O	77	(Italy) Lorenzo Petrarca	All
(Germany) Schedl GP Racing	KTM	KTM RC250GP	48	(Italy) Lorenzo Dalla Porta	6
(Germany) Schedl GP Racing	KTM	KTM RC250GP	65	(Germany) Philipp Öttl	1–5, 7–18
(India) Mahindra Racing	Mahindra	Mahindra MGP3O	53	(Italy) Marco Bezzecchi	10, 12
(India) Mahindra Racing	Mahindra	Mahindra MGP3O	62	(Italy) Stefano Manzi	10, 12–13
(Italy) Minimoto Portomaggiore	Mahindra	Mahindra MGP3O	71	(San Marino) Alex Fabbri	13
(Japan) Honda Team Asia	Honda	Honda NSF250RW	76	(Japan) Hiroki Ono	1–7, 9–18
(Japan) Honda Team Asia	Honda	Honda NSF250RW	89	(Malaysia) Khairul Idham Pawi	All

Key
Regular rider
Wildcard rider
Replacement rider

=== Rider changes ===
- Joan Mir, Andrea Locatelli, and Fabio Quartararo joined Leopard Racing, filling seat vacated by Danny Kent and Efrén Vázquez who moved up to Moto2 and Hiroki Ono joining Honda Team Asia.
- 2015 Red Bull MotoGP Rookies Cup Champion, Bo Bendsneyder made his Moto3 debut with Red Bull KTM Ajo, filling the seat vacated by Miguel Oliveira who moved up to Moto2.
- Karel Hanika rode for Platinum Bay Real Estate, replacing Alessandro Tonucci moves to Moto2. After Catalan GP, Hanika left and replaced by Danny Webb for 2 rounds. Later, replaced by Marcos Ramírez for the rest of season.
- Fabio Spiranelli made his Moto3 debut, joining CIP. Replacing Remy Gardner who moved up to Moto2.
- Fabio Di Giannantonio made his Moto3 debut, joining Gresini Racing after riding for them as a replacement for Andrea Locatelli in the 2015 Valencia GP.
- After 2015 season as wildcard in Valencia, Nicolò Bulega made his Moto3 debut, joining Sky Racing Team VR46.
- Adam Norrodin rode for SIC Racing Team, replacing Zulfahmi Khairuddin.
- Arón Canet made his Moto3 debut, joining Estrella Galicia 0,0.
- Juan Francisco Guevara joined RBA Racing Team, replacing both Isaac Viñales moved to Moto2 and Ana Carrasco left the team.
- Khairul Idham Pawi made his Moto3 debut, joining Honda Team Asia.
- Both Stefano Valtulini and Lorenzo Petrarca rode for 3570 Team Italia, filling seat vacated by both Stefano Manzi and Manuel Pagliani.

== Results and standings ==
=== Grands Prix ===
Round	Grand Prix	Pole position	Fastest lap	Winning rider	Winning team	Winning constructor	Report
1	Qatar motorcycle Grand Prix	(Italy) Romano Fenati	(Belgium) Livio Loi	(Italy) Niccolò Antonelli	(Italy) Ongetta–Rivacold	(Japan) Honda	Report
2	(Argentina) Argentine Republic motorcycle Grand Prix	(South Africa) Brad Binder	(Spain) Joan Mir	(Malaysia) Khairul Idham Pawi	(Japan) Honda Team Asia	(Japan) Honda	Report
3	(United States) Motorcycle Grand Prix of the Americas	(Germany) Philipp Öttl	(Italy) Romano Fenati	(Italy) Romano Fenati	(Italy) Sky Racing Team VR46	(Austria) KTM	Report
4	(Spain) Spanish motorcycle Grand Prix	(Italy) Nicolò Bulega	(South Africa) Brad Binder	(South Africa) Brad Binder	(Finland) Red Bull KTM Ajo	(Austria) KTM	Report
5	(France) French motorcycle Grand Prix	(Italy) Niccolò Antonelli	(Spain) Arón Canet	(South Africa) Brad Binder	(Finland) Red Bull KTM Ajo	(Austria) KTM	Report
6	(Italy) Italian motorcycle Grand Prix	(Italy) Romano Fenati	(Spain) Juan Francisco Guevara	(South Africa) Brad Binder	(Finland) Red Bull KTM Ajo	(Austria) KTM	Report
7	(Catalonia) Catalan motorcycle Grand Prix	(South Africa) Brad Binder	(Italy) Romano Fenati	(Spain) Jorge Navarro	(Spain) Estrella Galicia 0,0	(Japan) Honda	Report
8	(Netherlands) Dutch TT	(Italy) Enea Bastianini	(Spain) Arón Canet	(Italy) Francesco Bagnaia	(Spain) Aspar Mahindra Team Moto3	(India) Mahindra	Report
9	(Germany) German motorcycle Grand Prix	(Italy) Enea Bastianini	(Malaysia) Khairul Idham Pawi	(Malaysia) Khairul Idham Pawi	(Japan) Honda Team Asia	(Japan) Honda	Report
10	(Austria) Austrian motorcycle Grand Prix	(Spain) Joan Mir	(Germany) Philipp Öttl	(Spain) Joan Mir	(Luxembourg) Leopard Racing	(Austria) KTM	Report
11	Czech Republic motorcycle Grand Prix	(South Africa) Brad Binder	(South Africa) Brad Binder	(United Kingdom) John McPhee	(Germany) Peugeot MC Saxoprint	(France) Peugeot	Report
12	(United Kingdom) British motorcycle Grand Prix	(Italy) Francesco Bagnaia	(Italy) Nicolò Bulega	(South Africa) Brad Binder	(Finland) Red Bull KTM Ajo	(Austria) KTM	Report
13	San Marino and Rimini Riviera motorcycle Grand Prix	(South Africa) Brad Binder	(Italy) Andrea Locatelli	(South Africa) Brad Binder	(Finland) Red Bull KTM Ajo	(Austria) KTM	Report
14	Aragon motorcycle Grand Prix	(Italy) Enea Bastianini	(Spain) Juan Francisco Guevara	(Spain) Jorge Navarro	(Spain) Estrella Galicia 0,0	(Japan) Honda	Report
15	(Japan) Japanese motorcycle Grand Prix	(Japan) Hiroki Ono (Note: Hiroki Ono, who set the fastest time in qualifying, was given a 3-place grid penalty for a riding infringement during free practice. Andrea Migno started the race from pole position, although Ono was still credited with pole position.)	(Italy) Nicolò Bulega	(Italy) Enea Bastianini	(Italy) Gresini Racing Moto3	(Japan) Honda	Report
16	(Australia) Australian motorcycle Grand Prix	(South Africa) Brad Binder	(Italy) Andrea Locatelli	(South Africa) Brad Binder	(Finland) Red Bull KTM Ajo	(Austria) KTM	Report
17	(Malaysia) Malaysian motorcycle Grand Prix	(South Africa) Brad Binder	(Spain) Joan Mir	(Italy) Francesco Bagnaia	(Spain) Pull & Bear Aspar Mahindra Team	(India) Mahindra	Report
18	Valencian Community motorcycle Grand Prix	(Spain) Arón Canet	(South Africa) Brad Binder	(South Africa) Brad Binder	(Finland) Red Bull KTM Ajo	(Austria) KTM	Report

=== Riders' standings ===
Scoring system

Points were awarded to the top fifteen finishers. A rider had to finish the race to earn points.

Position	**1st**	**2nd**	**3rd**	**4th**	**5th**	**6th**	**7th**	**8th**	**9th**	**10th**	**11th**	**12th**	**13th**	**14th**	**15th**
Points	25	20	16	13	11	10	9	8	7	6	5	4	3	2	1

Pos	Rider	Bike	QAT (Qatar)	ARG (Argentina)	AME (United States)	SPA (Spain)	FRA (France)	ITA (Italy)	CAT (Catalonia)	NED (Netherlands)	GER (Germany)	AUT (Austria)	CZE (Czech Republic)	GBR (United Kingdom)	RSM (San Marino)	ARA (Aragon)	JPN (Japan)	AUS (Australia)	MAL (Malaysia)	VAL (Valencian Community)	Pts
1	(South Africa) Brad Binder	KTM	2	**3**	3	1	1	1	**2**	12	8	2	**Ret**	1	**1**	2	2	**1**	**17**	1	319
2	(Italy) Enea Bastianini	Honda	5	17	6	8		12	3	**Ret**	**3**	3	4	7	2	**3**	1	Ret		4	177
3	(Spain) Jorge Navarro	Honda	7	2	2	4	3	Ret	1		7	Ret	10	Ret	Ret	1	Ret	Ret	Ret	9	150
4	(Italy) Francesco Bagnaia	Mahindra	3	23	14	3	12	3	Ret	1	10	11	Ret	**2**	21	16	6	Ret	1	Ret	145
5	(Spain) Joan Mir	KTM	12	5	Ret	6	25	7	8	8	Ret	**1**	8	9	3	5	9	Ret	Ret	2	144
6	(Italy) Fabio Di Giannantonio	Honda	26	25	17	Ret	17	2	9	2	5	8	3	6	10	4	5	Ret	15	5	134
7	(Italy) Nicolò Bulega	KTM	6	18	10	**2**	5	8	5	7	Ret	9	9	5	4	Ret	3	Ret	Ret	17	129
8	(Czech Republic) Jakub Kornfeil	Honda	10	9	11	5	9	17	10	13	4	19	6	15	5	Ret	13	Ret	2	7	112
9	(Italy) Andrea Locatelli	KTM	21	4	5	Ret	10	Ret	19	Ret	2	13	Ret	14	6	17	Ret	2	5	20	96
10	(Italy) Romano Fenati	KTM	**4**	20	1	7	2	**Ret**	4	4	18	DNS									93
11	(Italy) Niccolò Antonelli	Honda	1	10	Ret	Ret	**8**	4	20	5	DNS	18	5	DSQ	11	14	10	Ret	12	16	91
12	(Germany) Philipp Öttl	KTM	9	15	**4**	10	Ret		17	11	17	5	15	12	8	10	4	14	Ret	8	85
13	(France) Fabio Quartararo	KTM	13	13	13	Ret	6	5	7	Ret	23	4	21	Ret	18	12	8	12	4	14	83
14	(Netherlands) Bo Bendsneyder	KTM	14	22	22	21	16	18	11	9	12	7	7	3	Ret	15	18	10	3	13	78
15	(Spain) Arón Canet	Honda	15	Ret	7	Ret	4	Ret	6	Ret	15	21	Ret	8	7	7	Ret	3	Ret	**19**	76
16	(Spain) Jorge Martín	Mahindra	Ret	8	Ret	Ret	18	14	Ret	DNS	Ret	6	2	10	DNS	6	Ret	6	Ret	10	72
17	(Italy) Andrea Migno	KTM	17	29	15	11	7	10	18	3	Ret	25	12	29	15	11	24	Ret	Ret	3	63
18	(Belgium) Livio Loi	Honda	8	16	8	17	11	16	16	15	14	10	14	20	13	18	7	5	9	15	63
19	(Malaysia) Khairul Idham Pawi	Honda	22	1	20	14	14	Ret	Ret	Ret	1	27	Ret	22	22	22	19	Ret	8	25	62
20	(France) Jules Danilo	Honda	11	26	9	9	Ret	11	Ret	6	9	16	11	13	14	19	16	9	Ret	26	58
21	(Spain) Juan Francisco Guevara	KTM	25	12	12	12	13	9	13	Ret	Ret	12	23	16	12	9	25	Ret	Ret	6	50
22	(United Kingdom) John McPhee	Peugeot	27	7	21	Ret	20	23	15	16	6	24	1	17	20	13	Ret	Ret			48
23	(Japan) Hiroki Ono	Honda	18	6	25	Ret	Ret	6	Ret		Ret	15	20	19	9	20	**DSQ**	8	DNS	21	36
24	(Argentina) Gabriel Rodrigo	KTM	19	19	18	13	Ret	13	Ret	Ret	13	Ret	17	11	Ret	8	Ret	Ret	7	Ret	31
25	(South Africa) Darryn Binder	Mahindra	23	30	Ret	Ret	Ret	Ret	12	17	Ret	17	Ret	21	Ret	26	22	4	10	12	27
26	(Spain) Marcos Ramírez	Mahindra										26	18	Ret	Ret	27	17	7	6	Ret	19
27	(Japan) Tatsuki Suzuki	Mahindra	28	27	19	15	15	19	14	Ret	11	Ret	13	25	Ret	21	15	13	Ret	18	16
28	(Malaysia) Adam Norrodin	Honda	20	11	Ret	16	Ret	22	Ret	19	Ret	23	Ret	23	23	23	12	11	Ret	27	14
29	(Italy) Stefano Manzi	Mahindra										20		4	16						13
30	(Italy) Lorenzo Dalla Porta	KTM						15						18	17	25	11	19	16	Ret	12
30	(Italy) Lorenzo Dalla Porta	Honda								10											12
31	(Spain) María Herrera	KTM	16	14	23	19	21	21	Ret	14	DNS	14	19	26	Ret	28	23	15	NC		7
32	(Spain) Raúl Fernández	KTM																		11	5
33	(Malaysia) Hafiq Azmi	Peugeot																	11		5
34	(Italy) Stefano Valtulini	Mahindra	29	28	Ret	DNS	22	24	Ret	18	20	28	Ret	Ret	26	Ret	Ret	Ret	13	31	3
35	(Spain) Albert Arenas	Mahindra				18			Ret	Ret											2
35	(Spain) Albert Arenas	Peugeot										22	Ret	Ret	19	24	14	16	Ret	24	2
36	(Italy) Lorenzo Petrarca	Mahindra	31	31	24	Ret	24	25	22	20	Ret	30	24	28	24	29	21	17	14	28	2
37	(France) Alexis Masbou	Peugeot	24	21	16	Ret	19	Ret	Ret	Ret	16										0
38	(Czech Republic) Karel Hanika	Mahindra	30	24	Ret	Ret	Ret	20	Ret												0
38	(Czech Republic) Karel Hanika	KTM											16							22	0
39	(Italy) Fabio Spiranelli	Mahindra	32	32	26	23	23	Ret	21	21	DNS	29	22	27	25	Ret	20	18	DNS		0
40	(Germany) Maximilian Kappler	KTM									19										0
41	(Australia) Matt Barton	FTR Honda																20			0
42	(Italy) Davide Pizzoli	KTM				20	DNS	DNS	Ret												0
43	(Germany) Tim Georgi	KTM									21										0
44	(United Kingdom) Danny Webb	Mahindra								22	22										0
45	(France) Enzo Boulom	KTM				22	Ret														0
45	(France) Enzo Boulom	Mahindra																		30	0
46	(Spain) Vicente Pérez	Peugeot																		23	0
47	(Italy) Marco Bezzecchi	Mahindra										Ret		24							0
48	(Japan) Shizuka Okazaki	Honda															26				0
49	(Spain) Daniel Sáez	KTM																		29	0
50	(Mexico) Gabriel Martínez	Mahindra														30					0
	(Japan) Ayumu Sasaki	Honda																	Ret		0
	(San Marino) Alex Fabbri	Mahindra													Ret						0
	(Japan) Rei Sato	Honda															DNS				0
Pos	Rider	Bike	QAT (Qatar)	ARG (Argentina)	AME (United States)	SPA (Spain)	FRA (France)	ITA (Italy)	CAT (Catalonia)	NED (Netherlands)	GER (Germany)	AUT (Austria)	CZE (Czech Republic)	GBR (United Kingdom)	RSM (San Marino)	ARA (Aragon)	JPN (Japan)	AUS (Australia)	MAL (Malaysia)	VAL (Valencian Community)	Pts

Colour	Result
Gold	Winner
Silver	Second place
Bronze	Third place
Green	Points classification
Blue	Non-points classification
Blue	Non-classified finish (NC)
Purple	Retired, not classified (Ret)
Red	Did not qualify (DNQ)
Red	Did not pre-qualify (DNPQ)
Black	Disqualified (DSQ)
White	Did not start (DNS)
White	Withdrew (WD)
White	Race cancelled (C)
Blank	Did not practice (DNP)
Blank	Did not arrive (DNA)
Blank	Excluded (EX)

**Bold** – Pole
Italics – Fastest Lap
Light blue – Rookie

=== Constructors' standings ===
Each constructor received the same number of points as their best placed rider in each race.

Pos	Manufacturer	QAT (Qatar)	ARG (Argentina)	AME (United States)	SPA (Spain)	FRA (France)	ITA (Italy)	CAT (Catalonia)	NED (Netherlands)	GER (Germany)	AUT (Austria)	CZE (Czech Republic)	GBR (United Kingdom)	RSM (San Marino)	ARA (Aragon)	JPN (Japan)	AUS (Australia)	MAL (Malaysia)	VAL (Valencian Community)	Pts
1	(Austria) KTM	2	3	1	1	1	1	2	3	2	1	7	1	1	2	2	1	3	1	382
2	(Japan) Honda	1	1	2	4	3	2	1	2	1	3	3	6	2	1	1	3	2	4	350
3	(India) Mahindra	3	8	14	3	12	3	12	1	10	6	2	2	16	6	6	4	1	10	211
4	(France) Peugeot	24	7	16	Ret	19	23	15	16	6	22	1	17	19	13	14	16	11	23	55
	(United Kingdom) FTR Honda																20			0
Pos	Manufacturer	QAT (Qatar)	ARG (Argentina)	AME (United States)	SPA (Spain)	FRA (France)	ITA (Italy)	CAT (Catalonia)	NED (Netherlands)	GER (Germany)	AUT (Austria)	CZE (Czech Republic)	GBR (United Kingdom)	RSM (San Marino)	ARA (Aragon)	JPN (Japan)	AUS (Australia)	MAL (Malaysia)	VAL (Valencian Community)	Pts
