= Juan Francisco Guevara =

Spanish motorcycle racer

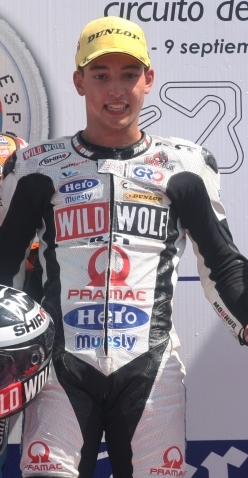
- Guevara in 2012
- Nationality: Spanish
- Born: 19 August 1995 (age 31); Lorca, Spain
- Website: http://www.juanfranguevara.es/
Motorcycle racing career statistics
Moto3 World Championship
Active years	2012–2017
Manufacturers	FTR Honda, TSR Honda, Kalex KTM, Mahindra, KTM
Championships	0
2017 championship position	11th (88 pts)
Starts / Wins / Podiums / Poles / F. laps / Points; 90 / 0 / 1 / 0 / 3 / 203
125cc World Championship
Active years	2011
Manufacturers	Aprilia
Championships	0
2011 championship position	NC (0 pts)
Starts / Wins / Podiums / Poles / F. laps / Points; 0 / 0 / 0 / 0 / 0 / 0

Juan Francisco "Juanfran" Guevara Silvente (born 19 August 1995 in Lorca, Murcia, Spain) is a retired Spanish Grand Prix motorcycle road racer, who last competed in the Moto3 World Championship with the RBA Racing Team.

== Career ==
=== CEV Moto3 Championship ===
==== Races by year ====
(key) (Races in bold indicate pole position, races in italics indicate fastest lap)

Year	Bike	1	2	3	4	5	6	7	Pos	Pts
2012	FTR Honda	JER; 5	NAV; Ret	**ARA**; 3	CAT; 6	ALB1; Ret	ALB2; 1	VAL; Ret	6th	62

==== By season ====
Season	Class	Motorcycle	Team	Race	Win	Podium	Pole	FLap	Pts	Plcd
2011	125cc	Aprilia	Team Murcia Pramac	0	0	0	0	0	0	NC
2012	Moto3	FTR Honda	Wild Wolf BST	2	0	0	0	0	4	32nd
2013	Moto3	TSR Honda	CIP Moto3	17	0	0	0	0	0	NC
2014	Moto3	Kalex KTM	Mapfre Aspar Team Moto3	18	0	0	0	1	46	17th
2015	Moto3	Mahindra	MAPFRE Team MAHINDRA Moto3	17	0	0	0	0	15	24th
2016	Moto3	KTM	RBA Racing Team	18	0	0	0	2	50	21st
2017	Moto3	KTM	RBA BOE Racing Team	18	0	1	0	0	88	11th
Total				**90**	**0**	**1**	**0**	**3**	**203**	

==== Races by year ====
(key) (Races in bold indicate pole position, races in italics indicate fastest lap)

Year	Class	Bike	1	2	3	4	5	6	7	8	9	10	11	12	13	14	15	16	17	18	Pos	Pts
2011	125cc	Aprilia	QAT	SPA	POR	FRA	CAT	GBR	NED	ITA	GER	CZE	INP	RSM	ARA	JPN	AUS	MAL	VAL; DNS		NC	0
2012	Moto3	FTR Honda	QAT	SPA	POR	FRA	CAT	GBR	NED	GER	ITA	INP	CZE	RSM	ARA; 24	JPN	MAL	AUS	VAL; 12		32nd	4
2013	Moto3	TSR Honda	QAT; 21	AME; 16	SPA; Ret	FRA; 22	ITA; Ret	CAT; 20	NED; Ret	GER; 25	INP; Ret	CZE; Ret	GBR; Ret	RSM; 27	ARA; 28	MAL; 21	AUS; 27	JPN; 22	VAL; 23		NC	0
2014	Moto3	Kalex KTM	QAT; Ret	AME; 11	ARG; 12	SPA; 16	FRA; Ret	ITA; 8	CAT; 28	NED; Ret	GER; 10	INP; 8	CZE; 16	GBR; 14	RSM; 9	ARA; Ret	JPN; Ret	AUS; 25	MAL; 11	VAL; 15	17th	46
2015	Moto3	Mahindra	QAT; 18	AME; Ret	ARG; Ret	SPA; 20	FRA; 12	ITA; Ret	CAT; 26	NED; Ret	GER; DNS	INP; 18	CZE; 14	GBR; 7	RSM; Ret	ARA; 21	JPN; 21	AUS; Ret	MAL; 20	VAL; Ret	24th	15
2016	Moto3	KTM	QAT; 25	ARG; 12	AME; 12	SPA; 12	FRA; 13	ITA; 9	CAT; 13	NED; Ret	GER; Ret	AUT; 12	CZE; 23	GBR; 16	RSM; 12	ARA; 9	JPN; 25	AUS; Ret	MAL; Ret	VAL; 6	21st	50
2017	Moto3	KTM	QAT; Ret	ARG; 9	AME; 6	SPA; 10	FRA; 5	ITA; 3	CAT; 17	NED; 12	GER; 12	CZE; 5	AUT; 14	GBR; Ret	RSM; Ret	ARA; 12	JPN; Ret	AUS; 23	MAL; 13	VAL; 6	11th	88
