= Hiroki Ono =

Japanese motorcycle racer (born 1992)

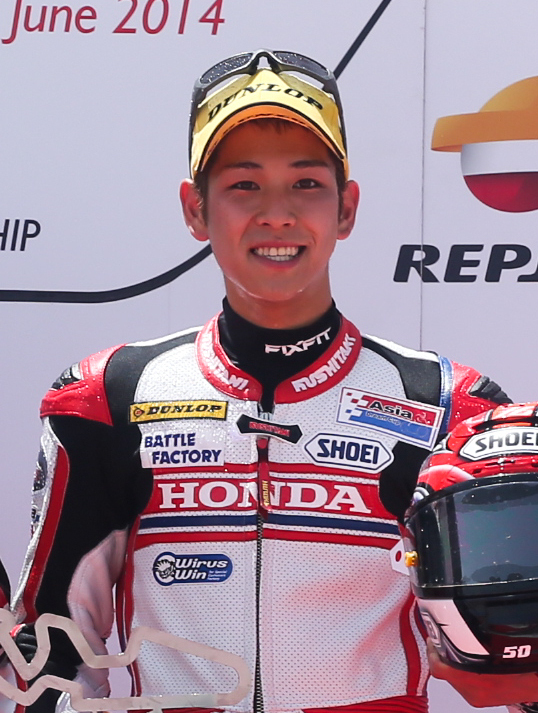
- Ono in 2014
- Nationality: Japanese
- Born: 15 July 1992 (age 34); Nara, Japan
- Current team: P.MU 7C Galespeed
- Bike number: 1
Motorcycle racing career statistics
Moto3 World Championship
Active years	2013–2016
Manufacturers	Honda
Championships	0
2016 championship position	23rd (36 pts)
Starts / Wins / Podiums / Poles / F. laps / Points; 34 / 0 / 0 / 1 / 0 / 70
125cc World Championship
Active years	2008, 2011
Manufacturers	Honda, KTM
Championships	0
2011 championship position	26th (8 pts)
Starts / Wins / Podiums / Poles / F. laps / Points; 5 / 0 / 0 / 0 / 0 / 8

Championship titles
- Asia Dream Cup (2015); All Japan Road Race J-GP3 Championship (2021, 2022, 2023, 2024, 2025); TVS Asia One Make Championship (2024, 2025)

Hiroki Ono (Japanese: 尾野 弘樹, Hepburn: Ono Hiroki; born 15 July 1992) is a Japanese Grand Prix motorcycle racer. He competes in the MFJ All Japan Road Race J-GP3 Championship for P.MU 7C GALESPEED, aboard a Honda NSF250R.

== Career ==
=== Japan Road Race Championship (JRR) ===
Born in Nara, and after racing in regional series within Japan, Ono stepped up to the Japan Road Race Championship (JRR) in the 125cc class with the Battle Factory Team in 2007. In 2008, he scored his first podium at Round 5 Suzuka with a second-place finish and finished that season third in the standings. That same year, he also got a chance to race as a wild card in the 125cc class of the MotoGP Japanese Grand Prix which was held at Twin Ring Motegi and finished the race in 24th.

In 2009, Ono won his first JRR race at Round 3 Autopolis and finished the season third for the second consecutive year. It was also his second consecutive year that he finished as champion in the standings designated as the Youth Cup which only counts riders aged 17 years or younger.

Also in 2009 after the JRR season ended, Ono made two wild card entries in the 125cc class of the CEV (Campeonato Español de Velocidad; Spanish Motorcycle Championships). The bike he rode was the KTM that Tomoyoshi Koyama had ridden during the previous MotoGP 125cc Championship season, and marked his debut with an outstanding third-place finish at Jerez.

=== Italian National Motorcycle Championship (CIV) ===
For 2010, Ono had plans going to compete as a full-time rider in the CEV but decided to race in the CIV (Italian Championship) at the last minute. He started his CIV season with the prestigious RUMI team, who were developing their original machine, as their test and race rider. Ono's first race of the season came at Round 2 Monza and scored his first podium (third) at Round 6 Misano. He finished the season fifth in the standings.

Also this year, Ono made two wild-card entries to the All Japan series at Round 2 Autopolis and Round 7 Suzuka. The Autopolis race was cancelled due to extreme weather, but won the seventh and final round at Suzuka. In addition, he raced in the Albacete round of the European Championship in which only riders within high rankings in each European nation's national championships can participate in. However, Ono was not able to finish the race.

=== 125cc World Championship ===
In 2011, Ono started the season in the MotoGP 125cc class with the Caretta Technology Forward Team, from Italy. His bike was a KTM, meaning no developments on the bike had been made since 2009, the year that the manufacturer withdrew from the championship. Ono showed his skills and potential by finishing a shocking eighth with that bike at a wet Round 2 Jerez, but lost his seat three rounds later to French rider Alexis Masbou. Ono's last MotoGP race of the season was Round 4 Le Mans.

=== Asia Dream Cup ===
For the 2012 season, Ono switched to the Asia Dream Cup, a one-make series in which every rider rides a Honda CBR250R provided by Honda. Ono's crash on the main stretch right before the chequered flag in Round 2 Indonesia resulted in a broken neck but healed in time for the following round in which he finished first and second. He finished the season second overall behind fellow Japanese rider Hikari Okubo despite having four more wins. He remained in the Asia Dream Cup for 2013 and became champion.

=== Moto3 World Championship ===
In 2013, Ono made a one-off wildcard appearance at his home race at Motegi, but he failed to finish the race. In 2014, Ono made another wildcard entry at Aragon and finished the race in eleventh place.

Ono made a full-time return to World Championship level, competing in Moto3 with Leopard Racing; he partnered Danny Kent and Efrén Vázquez in the team. Riding a Honda, Ono's best result was eighth place at the final round of the season, in Valencia.

For 2016, Ono left Leopard Racing to join Honda Team Asia alongside Khairul Idham Pawi, again riding a Honda. He finished the season at 23rd place, scoring 36 points.

== Career statistics ==
=== All Japan Road Race Championship ===
Season	Class	Team	Motorcycle	Race	Win	Podium	Pole	Pts	Plcd
2007	GP125	Battle & Mihara Racing	Honda RS125	6	0	0	0	19	14th
2008	GP125	Battle Factory	Honda RS125	6	0	1	0	70	**3rd**
2009	GP125	Battle Factory	Honda RS125	6	1	3	1	77	**3rd**
2010	J-GP3	Battle Factory	Honda RS125	2	1	1	0	36	16th
2013	J-GP3	Honda Team Asia	Honda NSF250R	1	1	1	0	0	NC
2018	J-GP2	Mikuni Terry & Curry	Suzuki GSX-R600	4	0	0	0	33	12th
Total				**25**	**3**	**6**	**1**	**235**	

==== Races by year ====
(key) (Races in bold indicate pole position; races in italics indicate fastest lap)

Year	Class	Bike	1	2	3	4	5	6	7	Pos	Pts
2025	J-GP3	Honda	**SUG**; 2	**TSU1**; 1	**TSU2**; 1	**MOT**; 1	AUT; 1	OKA; 1	SUZ; 2	1st	155.5
2026	J-GP3	Honda	**SUG**; 1	**AUT**; DSQ	TSU; 1	MOT; DNS	OKA	SUZ		7th	50

=== Spanish National Motorcycle Championship (CEV) ===
Season	Class	Team	Motorcycle	Race	Win	Podium	Pole	Pts	Plcd
2009	125GP	B&B Battle Factory	KTM 125FRR	2	0	1	0	25	16th
2010	125GP	Battle Factory	KTM 125FRR	2	0	0	0	12	21st
2013	Moto3	Honda Team Asia	TSR Honda	2	0	0	0	6	30th
2014	Moto3	Honda Team Asia	TSR Honda	9	0	4	0	116	**3rd**
2017	Moto2	NTS Sportscode T.PRO	NTS	11	0	0	0	74	8th
Total				**26**	**0**	**5**	**0**	**233**	

==== Races by year ====
(key) (Races in bold indicate pole position, races in italics indicate fastest lap)

Year	Class	Bike	1	2	3	4	5	6	7	8	9	10	11	Pos	Pts
2013	Moto3	Honda	CAT1	CAT2	ARA	ALB1	ALB2	NAV	VAL1; 10	VAL1; Ret	JER			30th	6
2014	Moto3	TSR Honda	JER1; 8	JER2; 4	LMS; 3	ARA; 3	CAT1; 3	CAT2; 2	ALB; 11	NAV; 4	ALG; 7	VAL1; DNS	VAL1; DNS	3rd	116
2017	Moto2	NTS	ALB; 12	CAT1; Ret	CAT2; 12	VAL1; 8	VAL2; 5	EST1; 8	EST2; 7	JER; 7	ARA1; 11	ARA2; 6	VAL; 10	8th	74

=== Italian National Motorcycle Championship (CIV) ===
Season	Class	Team	Motorcycle	Race	Win	Podium	Pole	Pts	Plcd
2010	125GP	Rumi 125GP Team	RUMI	6	0	1	0	55	5th
2011	125GP	Rumi 125GP Team	RUMI	2	0	1	0	23	15th
Total				**8**	**0**	**2**	**0**	**78**	

=== Grand Prix motorcycle racing ===
==== By season ====
Season	Class	Motorcycle	Team	Race	Win	Podium	Pole	FLap	Pts	Plcd
2008	125cc	Honda RS125	Battle Factory	1	0	0	0	0	0	NC
2011	125cc	KTM FRR125	Caretta Technology Forward Team	4	0	0	0	0	8	26th
2013	Moto3	Honda NSF250R	Honda Team Asia	1	0	0	0	0	0	NC
2014	Moto3	Honda NSF250R	Honda Team Asia	1	0	0	0	0	5	26th
2015	Moto3	Honda NSF250RW	Leopard Racing	17	0	0	0	0	29	21st
2016	Moto3	Honda NSF250RW	Honda Team Asia	15	0	0	1	0	36	23rd
Total				**39**	**0**	**0**	**1**	**0**	**78**	

==== Races by year ====
(key) (Races in bold indicate pole position; races in italics indicate fastest lap)

Year	Class	Bike	1	2	3	4	5	6	7	8	9	10	11	12	13	14	15	16	17	18	Pos	Pts
2008	125cc	Honda	QAT	SPA	POR	CHN	FRA	ITA	CAT	GBR	NED	GER	CZE	RSM	INP	JPN; 24	AUS	MAL	VAL		NC	0
2011	125cc	KTM	QAT; Ret	SPA; 8	POR; 17	FRA; 16	CAT	GBR	NED	ITA	GER	CZE	INP	RSM	ARA	JPN	AUS	MAL	VAL		26th	8
2013	Moto3	Honda	QAT	AME	SPA	FRA	ITA	CAT	NED	GER	INP	CZE	GBR	RSM	ARA	MAL	AUS	JPN; Ret	VAL		NC	0
2014	Moto3	Honda	QAT	AME	ARG	SPA	FRA	ITA	CAT	NED	GER	INP	CZE	GBR	RSM	ARA; 11	JPN	AUS	MAL	VAL	26th	5
2015	Moto3	Honda	QAT; Ret	AME; Ret	ARG; 13	SPA; Ret	FRA; 11	ITA; 11	CAT; Ret	NED; 14	GER; Ret	INP; 26	CZE; Ret	GBR; 20	RSM; 16	ARA; 10	JPN; Ret	AUS	MAL; Ret	VAL; 8	21st	29
2016	Moto3	Honda	QAT; 18	ARG; 6	AME; 25	SPA; Ret	SPA; Ret	ITA; 6	CAT; Ret	NED	GER; Ret	AUT; 15	CZE; 20	GBR; 19	RSM; 9	ARA; 20	**JPN**; DSQ	AUS; 8	MAL; DNS	VAL; 21	23rd	36

=== Asia Dream Cup ===
Season	Motorcycle	Round	Race	Win	Podium	Pole	FLap	Pts	Plcd
2012	Honda CBR250R	6	12	5	7	4	4	186	**2nd**
2013	Honda CBR250R	5	10	7	9	4	3	228	**1st**

=== TVS Asia One Make Championship ===
==== Races by year ====
(key) (Races in bold indicate pole position; races in italics indicate fastest lap)

Year	Bike	1		2		3		4		5		6		Pos	Pts
Year	Bike	R1	R2	R1	R2	R1	R2	R1	R2	R1	R2	R1	R2	Pos	Pts
2023	TVS Apache RR310	CHA	CHA	SEP	SEP	**SUG**; 1	**SUG**; Ret	**MAN**; 1	**MAN**; 1	ZHU; 1	ZHU; 1	**CHA**; 1	**CHA**; 1	2nd	175
2024	TVS Apache RR310	**CHA**; 1	**CHA**; 1	**ZHU**; 1	ZHU; C	MOT; 1	MOT; 1	MAN; 1	MAN; 2	SEP; 1	SEP; 10	CHA; 1	CHA; 1	1st	251
2025	TVS Apache RR310	CHA; 1	CHA; 3	SEP; 2	SEP; 4	**MOT**; 1	**MOT**; 1	**MAN**; 1	**MAN**; 14	**SEP**; 1	**SEP**; 1	CHA; 4	CHA; 1	1st	239

=== Asia Production 250 ===
==== Races by year ====
(key) (Races in bold indicate pole position; races in italics indicate fastest lap)

Year	Bike	1		2		3		4		5		6		Pos	Pts
Year	Bike	R1	R2	R1	R2	R1	R2	R1	R2	R1	R2	R1	R2	Pos	Pts
2026	Honda	SEP	SEP	BUR; 1	BUR; 8	MOT; 1	MOT; 1	MAN; 22	MAN; Ret	SEP	SEP	BUR	BUR	7th*	83*
