= Fabio Spiranelli =

Italian motorcycle racer

- Nationality: Italian
- Born: 5 December 1999 (age 26); Lodi, Lombardy, Italy
Motorcycle racing career statistics
Moto3 World Championship
| Active years | 2016 |
| Manufacturers | Mahindra |
| Championships | 0 |
| 2016 championship position | 39th (0 pts) |
Starts / Wins / Podiums / Poles / F. laps / Points; 15 / 0 / 0 / 0 / 0 / 0

Fabio Spiranelli (born 5 December 1999) is an Italian motorcycle racer.

== Career ==
For 2016, Spiranelli joined the Mahindra-equipped CIP-Unicom Starker team to debut in the Moto3 World Championship. He did not score championship points in the whole season, having achieved a best result of 18th at Phillip Island.

== Career statistics ==
=== Grand Prix motorcycle racing ===
==== By season ====
| Season | Class | Motorcycle | Team | Race | Win | Podium | Pole | FLap | Pts | Plcd |
|---|---|---|---|---|---|---|---|---|---|---|
| 2016 | Moto3 | Mahindra | CIP-Unicom Starker | 15 | 0 | 0 | 0 | 0 | 0 | 39th |
| Total | | | | 15 | 0 | 0 | 0 | 0 | 0 | |

==== Races by year ====
| Year | Class | Bike | 1 | 2 | 3 | 4 | 5 | 6 | 7 | 8 | 9 | 10 | 11 | 12 | 13 | 14 | 15 | 16 | 17 | 18 | Pos | Pts |
|---|---|---|---|---|---|---|---|---|---|---|---|---|---|---|---|---|---|---|---|---|---|---|
| 2016 | Moto3 | Mahindra | QAT; 32 | ARG; 32 | AME; 26 | SPA; 23 | FRA; 23 | ITA; Ret | CAT; 21 | NED; 21 | GER; DNS | AUT; 29 | CZE; 22 | GBR; 27 | RSM; 25 | ARA; Ret | JPN; 20 | AUS; 18 | MAL; DNS | VAL | 39th | 0 |
