= Honda NSF250R =

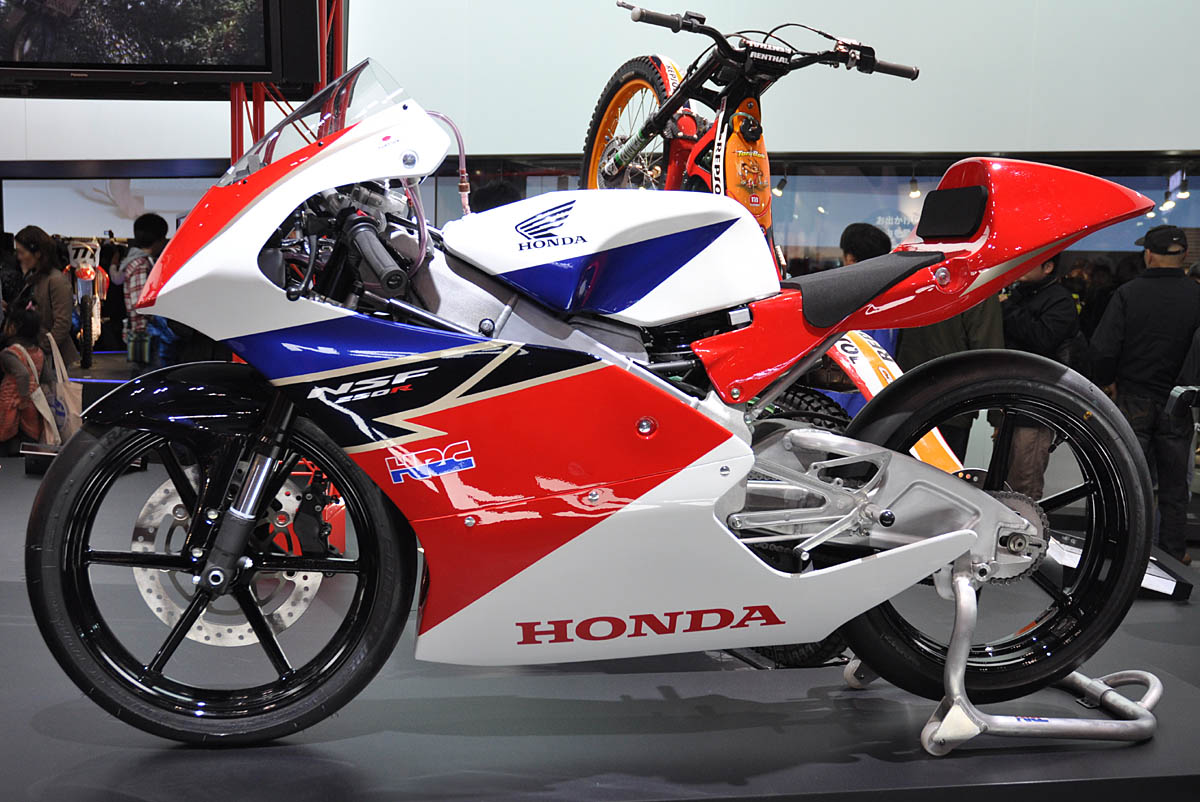
- Manufacturer: Honda Racing Corporation
- Production: 2012–present
- Predecessor: RS125R
- Successor: NSF250RW
- Engine: 249.3 cc (15.21 cu in) four-stroke single-cylinder
- Bore / stroke: 78 mm × 52.2 mm (3.07 in × 2.06 in)
- Power: 47 hp (35 kW) @ 13,000 rpm
- Transmission: 6-speed, constant mesh, cassette style
- Wheelbase: 1219 mm
- Dimensions: L: 1809 mm W: 560 mm
- Weight: 84kg (dry)
- Fuel capacity: 11 liters
- Related: Honda NSF100

The Honda NSF250R is a four-stroke race motorcycle from HRC (Honda Racing Corporation) developed in 2011 to replace the Honda RS125R, a two-stroke. Honda's NSF250R joined the newly created Moto3 World Championship in 2012. An updated model, the NSF250RW was introduced in 2014, and won the constructors' title for the first time in 2015. The motorcycle is one of the most successful machines of the Moto3 era to date, having taken five constructors' championships and five different riders' to their respective championships.

== Main Features ==
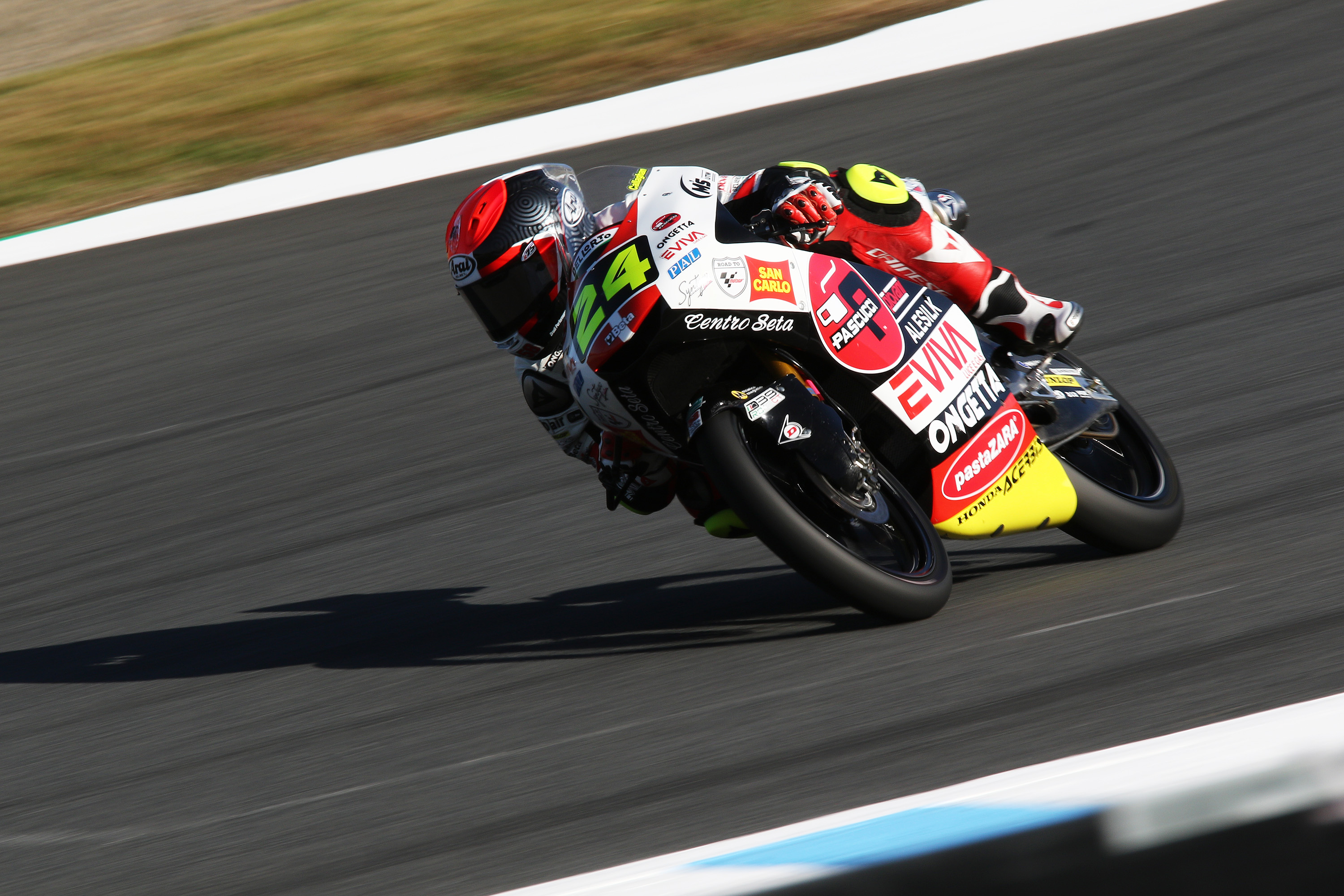
2018 Honda NSF250RW

Overall length × Overall width × Overall height	1809×560×1037 mm
Wheelbase	1219 mm
Seat height	729 mm
Caster angle	22°36"
Curb weight	84 kg
Fuel tank capacity	11 litres
Engine type	liquid-cooled 4-stroke DOHC single cylinder
Maximum power	35.5 kW (47.6 hp) @ 13,000 rpm
Maximum torque	28 N.m. (20.7 lb-ft) @ 10,500 rpm
Transmission	6-speed, constant mesh, final chain drive

== Grand Prix Racing Results ==
=== Constructors' Championship Results ===
Season	Points	Position
2012	87	5th
2013	0	NC
2014	384	2nd
2015	411	1st
2016	350	2nd
2017	445	1st
2018	401	1st
2019	439	1st
2020	326	1st
2021	360	2nd
2022	330	2nd
2023	327	2nd
2024	300	3rd
2025	308	2nd

=== Rider's Champions ===
- (Spain) Álex Márquez, 2014, 278 pts.
- (United Kingdom) Danny Kent, 2015, 260 pts.
- (Spain) Joan Mir, 2017, 341 pts.
- (Spain) Jorge Martín, 2018, 260 pts.
- (Italy) Lorenzo Dalla Porta, 2019, 279 pts.
- (Spain) Jaume Masià, 2023, 274 pts.

== See also ==
- KTM RC250GP
- FTR M3
- Suter MMX3
- Mahindra MGP3O
- Ioda TR
- Oral Engineering OE-250M3R
