= 2017 French motorcycle Grand Prix =

(France) 2017 French Grand Prix
Race details
- Race 5 of 18 races in the 2017 Grand Prix motorcycle racing season
- Date: May 21, 2017
- Official name: HJC Helmets Grand Prix de France
- Location: Bugatti Circuit
- Course: Permanent racing facility; 4.185 km (2.600 mi)

MotoGP
Pole position
Rider	(Spain) Maverick Viñales	Yamaha
Time	1:31.994	
Fastest lap
Rider	(Spain) Maverick Viñales	Yamaha
Time	1:32.309 on lap 28	
Podium
First	(Spain) Maverick Viñales	Yamaha
Second	(France) Johann Zarco	Yamaha
Third	(Spain) Dani Pedrosa	Honda

Moto2
Pole position
Rider	(Switzerland) Thomas Lüthi	Kalex
Time	1:36.548	
Fastest lap
Rider	(Italy) Franco Morbidelli	Kalex
Time	1:36.836 on lap 21	
Podium
First	(Italy) Franco Morbidelli	Kalex
Second	(Italy) Francesco Bagnaia	Kalex
Third	(Switzerland) Thomas Lüthi	Kalex

Moto3
Pole position
Rider	(Spain) Jorge Martín	Honda
Time	1:42.813	
Fastest lap
Rider	(Spain) Joan Mir	Honda
Time	1:42.485 on lap 3	
Podium
First	(Spain) Joan Mir	Honda
Second	(Spain) Arón Canet	Honda
Third	(Italy) Fabio Di Giannantonio	Honda

The 2017 French motorcycle Grand Prix was the fifth round of the 2017 MotoGP season. It was held at the Bugatti Circuit in Le Mans on May 21, 2017.

== MotoGP race report ==
Yamaha riders clean swept the front row of the grid for the first time since the 2008 Qatar Grand Prix. Teammates Maverick Viñales and Valentino Rossi fought for the victory throughout, with the Italian crashing out for the final lap, and Viñales taking his third win for Yamaha in five races. Johann Zarco scored his first podium finish and became the first French rider in the MotoGP class to stand on the podium since Randy de Puniet in the 2009 British Grand Prix.

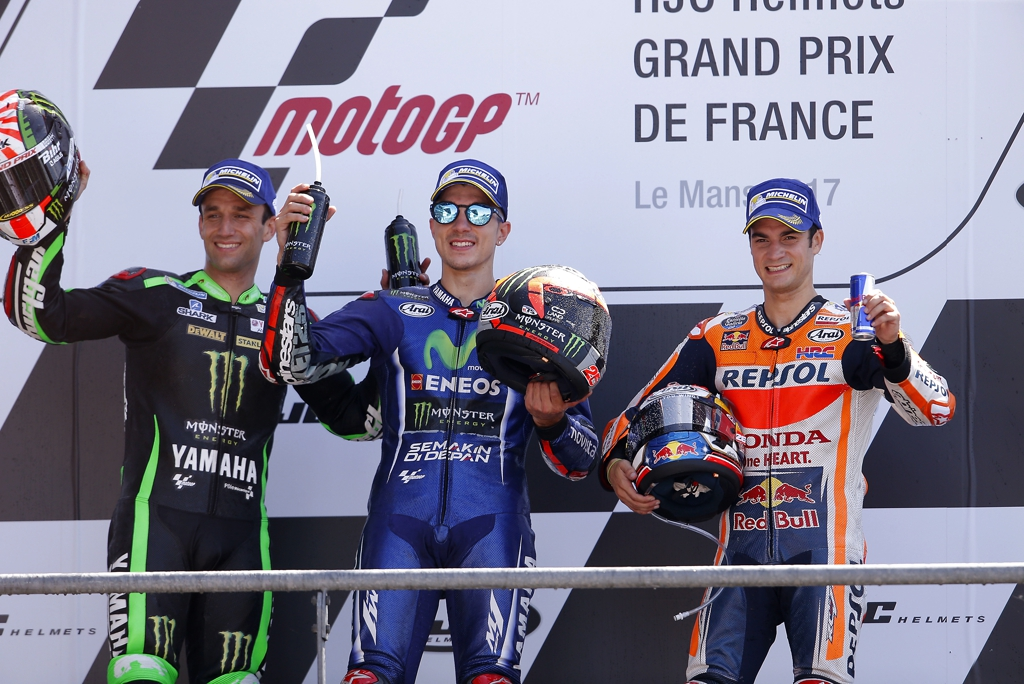
Johann Zarco, Maverick Viñales and Dani Pedrosa, celebrating on the podium after finishing second, first and third in the MotoGP race.

== Classification ==
=== MotoGP ===
Pos.	No.	Rider	Team	Manufacturer	Laps	Time/Retired	Grid	Points
1	25	(Spain) Maverick Viñales	Movistar Yamaha MotoGP	Yamaha	28	43:29.793	1	25
2	5	(France) Johann Zarco	Monster Yamaha Tech 3	Yamaha	28	+3.134	3	20
3	26	(Spain) Dani Pedrosa	Repsol Honda Team	Honda	28	+7.717	13	16
4	4	(Italy) Andrea Dovizioso	Ducati Team	Ducati	28	+11.223	6	13
5	35	(United Kingdom) Cal Crutchlow	LCR Honda	Honda	28	+13.519	4	11
6	99	(Spain) Jorge Lorenzo	Ducati Team	Ducati	28	+24.002	16	10
7	94	(Germany) Jonas Folger	Monster Yamaha Tech 3	Yamaha	28	+25.733	15	9
8	43	(Australia) Jack Miller	EG 0,0 Marc VDS	Honda	28	+32.603	11	8
9	76	(France) Loris Baz	Reale Avintia Racing	Ducati	28	+45.784	12	7
10	29	(Italy) Andrea Iannone	Team Suzuki Ecstar	Suzuki	28	+48.332	17	6
11	53	(Spain) Tito Rabat	EG 0,0 Marc VDS	Honda	28	+50.036	22	5
12	44	(Spain) Pol Espargaró	Red Bull KTM Factory Racing	KTM	28	+52.661	8	4
13	38	(United Kingdom) Bradley Smith	Red Bull KTM Factory Racing	KTM	28	+53.179	10	3
14	22	(United Kingdom) Sam Lowes	Aprilia Racing Team Gresini	Aprilia	28	+55.432	21	2
15	50	(France) Sylvain Guintoli	Team Suzuki Ecstar	Suzuki	28	+1:06.878	23	1
Ret	46	(Italy) Valentino Rossi	Movistar Yamaha MotoGP	Yamaha	27	Accident	2	
Ret	41	(Spain) Aleix Espargaró	Aprilia Racing Team Gresini	Aprilia	23	Engine	18	
Ret	93	(Spain) Marc Márquez	Repsol Honda Team	Honda	17	Accident	5	
Ret	9	(Italy) Danilo Petrucci	Octo Pramac Racing	Ducati	17	Oil Leak	19	
Ret	45	(United Kingdom) Scott Redding	Octo Pramac Racing	Ducati	7	Gearshift	7	
Ret	17	(Czech Republic) Karel Abraham	Pull&Bear Aspar Team	Ducati	5	Retired	9	
Ret	8	(Spain) Héctor Barberá	Reale Avintia Racing	Ducati	3	Retired	20	
Ret	19	(Spain) Álvaro Bautista	Pull&Bear Aspar Team	Ducati	0	Accident	14	

=== Moto2 ===
Pos.	No.	Rider	Manufacturer	Laps	Time/Retired	Grid	Points
1	21	(Italy) Franco Morbidelli	Kalex	26	42:17.557	3	25
2	42	(Italy) Francesco Bagnaia	Kalex	26	+1.714	2	20
3	12	(Switzerland) Thomas Lüthi	Kalex	26	+5.837	1	16
4	73	(Spain) Álex Márquez	Kalex	26	+6.212	6	13
5	54	(Italy) Mattia Pasini	Kalex	26	+13.537	7	11
6	77	(Switzerland) Dominique Aegerter	Suter	26	+14.945	5	10
7	30	(Japan) Takaaki Nakagami	Kalex	26	+16.413	18	9
8	24	(Italy) Simone Corsi	Speed Up	26	+16.681	14	8
9	97	(Spain) Xavi Vierge	Tech 3	26	+17.163	11	7
10	68	(Colombia) Yonny Hernández	Kalex	26	+17.605	13	6
11	55	(Malaysia) Hafizh Syahrin	Kalex	26	+22.528	22	5
12	23	(Germany) Marcel Schrötter	Suter	26	+22.909	9	4
13	88	(Spain) Ricard Cardús	KTM	26	+23.801	15	3
14	11	(Germany) Sandro Cortese	Suter	26	+24.322	10	2
15	49	(Spain) Axel Pons	Kalex	26	+25.959	16	1
16	19	(Belgium) Xavier Siméon	Kalex	26	+26.116	12	
17	44	(Portugal) Miguel Oliveira	KTM	26	+26.394	17	
18	40	(France) Fabio Quartararo	Kalex	26	+26.846	20	
19	5	(Italy) Andrea Locatelli	Kalex	26	+28.506	26	
20	87	(Australia) Remy Gardner	Tech 3	26	+48.794	23	
21	45	(Japan) Tetsuta Nagashima	Kalex	26	+49.354	27	
22	89	(Malaysia) Khairul Idham Pawi	Kalex	26	+49.680	31	
23	2	(Switzerland) Jesko Raffin	Kalex	26	+49.913	25	
24	47	(Italy) Axel Bassani	Speed Up	26	+1:03.235	28	
25	57	(Spain) Edgar Pons	Kalex	26	+1:03.801	30	
Ret	32	(Spain) Isaac Viñales	Kalex	25	Retired	19	
Ret	6	(United Kingdom) Tarran Mackenzie	Suter	21	Accident	29	
Ret	7	(Italy) Lorenzo Baldassarri	Kalex	17	Handling	8	
Ret	9	(Spain) Jorge Navarro	Kalex	8	Accident Damage	21	
Ret	62	(Italy) Stefano Manzi	Kalex	7	Accident	24	
Ret	10	(Italy) Luca Marini	Kalex	0	Accident	4	
DNS	27	(Spain) Iker Lecuona	Kalex		Did not start		
OFFICIAL MOTO2 REPORT

=== Moto3 ===
The race, scheduled to be run for 24 laps, was red-flagged due to oil being spilled onto the track resulting to a multiple rider crash in turn 4. The race was later restarted over 16 laps.

Pos.	No.	Rider	Manufacturer	Laps	Time/Retired	Grid	Points
1	36	(Spain) Joan Mir	Honda	16	27:37.830	8	25
2	44	(Spain) Arón Canet	Honda	16	+4.252	12	20
3	21	(Italy) Fabio Di Giannantonio	Honda	16	+4.365	15	16
4	42	(Spain) Marcos Ramírez	KTM	16	+4.469	7	13
5	58	(Spain) Juan Francisco Guevara	KTM	16	+4.845	3	11
6	33	(Italy) Enea Bastianini	Honda	16	+5.463	11	10
7	95	(France) Jules Danilo	Honda	16	+5.652	16	9
8	16	(Italy) Andrea Migno	KTM	16	+5.821	23	8
9	64	(Netherlands) Bo Bendsneyder	KTM	16	+6.049	9	7
10	52	(United Kingdom) Danny Kent	KTM	16	+6.193	10	'6
11	84	(Czech Republic) Jakub Kornfeil	Peugeot	16	+7.504	18	5
12	17	(United Kingdom) John McPhee	Honda	16	+8.741	25	4
13	41	(Thailand) Nakarin Atiratphuvapat	Honda	16	+16.006	30	3
14	48	(Italy) Lorenzo Dalla Porta	Mahindra	16	+16.405	20	2
15	12	(Italy) Marco Bezzecchi	Mahindra	16	+16.514	21	1
16	11	(Belgium) Livio Loi	Honda	16	+16.639	13	
17	8	(Italy) Nicolò Bulega	KTM	16	+16.752	2	
18	96	(Italy) Manuel Pagliani	Mahindra	16	+16.996	14	
19	71	(Japan) Ayumu Sasaki	Honda	16	+17.046	27	
20	6	(Spain) María Herrera	KTM	16	+17.206	29	
21	65	(Germany) Philipp Öttl	KTM	16	+28.501	28	
22	14	(Italy) Tony Arbolino	Honda	16	+33.398	24	
23	4	(Finland) Patrik Pulkkinen	Peugeot	16	+42.059	31	
Ret	40	(South Africa) Darryn Binder	KTM	15	Accident	17	
Ret	24	(Japan) Tatsuki Suzuki	Honda	14	Accident	22	
Ret	27	(Japan) Kaito Toba	Honda	14	Accident	26	
Ret	23	(Italy) Niccolò Antonelli	KTM	11	Accident	6	
Ret	88	(Spain) Jorge Martín	Honda	10	Retired	1	
Ret	5	(Italy) Romano Fenati	Honda	7	Accident	4	
Ret	75	(Spain) Albert Arenas	Mahindra	3	Accident	5	
DNS	7	(Malaysia) Adam Norrodin	Honda	0	Did not restart	19	
DNS	19	(Argentina) Gabriel Rodrigo	KTM		Did not start		
OFFICIAL MOTO3 REPORT

== Championship standings after the race ==
=== MotoGP ===
Below are the standings for the top five riders and constructors after round five has concluded.

Riders' Championship standings

Pos.	Rider	Points
1	(Spain) Maverick Viñales	85
2	(Spain) Dani Pedrosa	68
3	(Italy) Valentino Rossi	62
4	(Spain) Marc Márquez	58
5	(France) Johann Zarco	55

Constructors' Championship standings

Pos.	Constructor	Points
1	(Japan) Yamaha	108
2	(Japan) Honda	95
3	(Italy) Ducati	72
4	(Japan) Suzuki	22
5	(Italy) Aprilia	19

- Note: Only the top five positions are included for both sets of standings.

=== Moto2 ===
Pos.	Rider	Points
1	(Italy) Franco Morbidelli	100
2	(Switzerland) Thomas Lüthi	80
3	(Spain) Álex Márquez	62
4	(Portugal) Miguel Oliveira	59
5	(Italy) Francesco Bagnaia	53
6	(Japan) Takaaki Nakagami	41
7	(Switzerland) Dominique Aegerter	37
8	(Spain) Xavi Vierge	32
9	(Italy) Luca Marini	31
10	(Italy) Simone Corsi	27

=== Moto3 ===
Pos.	Rider	Points
1	(Spain) Joan Mir	99
2	(Italy) Romano Fenati	65
3	(Spain) Arón Canet	63
4	(Spain) Jorge Martín	59
5	(United Kingdom) John McPhee	53
6	(Italy) Fabio Di Giannantonio	51
7	(Italy) Andrea Migno	43
8	(Spain) Marcos Ramírez	36
9	(Spain) Juan Francisco Guevara	34
10	(Italy) Enea Bastianini	31

== Notes ==
Previous race: 2017 Spanish Grand Prix	FIM Grand Prix World Championship; 2017 season	Next race: 2017 Italian Grand Prix
Previous race: 2016 French Grand Prix	French motorcycle Grand Prix	Next race: 2018 French Grand Prix
