= 2016 French motorcycle Grand Prix =

(France) 2016 French Grand Prix
Race details
- Race 5 of 18 races in the 2016 Grand Prix motorcycle racing season
- Date: 8 May 2016
- Official name: Monster Energy Grand Prix de France
- Location: Bugatti Circuit
- Course: Permanent racing facility; 4.185 km (2.600 mi)

MotoGP
Pole position
Rider	(Spain) Jorge Lorenzo	Yamaha
Time	1:31.975	
Fastest lap
Rider	(Italy) Valentino Rossi	Yamaha
Time	1:33.293 on lap 4	
Podium
First	(Spain) Jorge Lorenzo	Yamaha
Second	(Italy) Valentino Rossi	Yamaha
Third	(Spain) Maverick Viñales	Suzuki

Moto2
Pole position
Rider	(Switzerland) Thomas Lüthi	Kalex
Time	1:36.847	
Fastest lap
Rider	(Spain) Álex Rins	Kalex
Time	1:37.297 on lap 4	
Podium
First	(Spain) Álex Rins	Kalex
Second	(Italy) Simone Corsi	Speed Up
Third	(Switzerland) Thomas Lüthi	Kalex

Moto3
Pole position
Rider	(Italy) Niccolò Antonelli	Honda
Time	1:42.756	
Fastest lap
Rider	(Spain) Arón Canet	Honda
Time	1:42.923 on lap 11	
Podium
First	(South Africa) Brad Binder	KTM
Second	(Italy) Romano Fenati	KTM
Third	(Spain) Jorge Navarro	Honda

The 2016 French motorcycle Grand Prix was the fifth round of the 2016 MotoGP season. It was held at the Bugatti Circuit in Le Mans on 8 May 2016.

== Classification ==
=== MotoGP ===
Pos.	No.	Rider	Team	Manufacturer	Laps	Time/Retired	Grid	Points
1	99	(Spain) Jorge Lorenzo	Movistar Yamaha MotoGP	Yamaha	28	43:51.290	1	25
2	46	(Italy) Valentino Rossi	Movistar Yamaha MotoGP	Yamaha	28	+10.654	7	20
3	25	(Spain) Maverick Viñales	Team Suzuki Ecstar	Suzuki	28	+14.177	8	16
4	26	(Spain) Dani Pedrosa	Repsol Honda Team	Honda	28	+18.719	11	13
5	44	(Spain) Pol Espargaró	Monster Yamaha Tech 3	Yamaha	28	+24.931	4	11
6	41	(Spain) Aleix Espargaró	Team Suzuki Ecstar	Suzuki	28	+32.921	12	10
7	9	(Italy) Danilo Petrucci	Octo Pramac Yakhnich	Ducati	28	+38.251	10	9
8	8	(Spain) Héctor Barberá	Avintia Racing	Ducati	28	+38.504	13	8
9	19	(Spain) Álvaro Bautista	Aprilia Racing Team Gresini	Aprilia	28	+48.536	19	7
10	6	(Germany) Stefan Bradl	Aprilia Racing Team Gresini	Aprilia	28	+54.502	17	6
11	50	(Republic of Ireland) Eugene Laverty	Aspar Team MotoGP	Ducati	28	+1:02.677	16	5
12	76	(France) Loris Baz	Avintia Racing	Ducati	28	+1:07.658	21	4
13	93	(Spain) Marc Márquez	Repsol Honda Team	Honda	27	+1 lap	2	3
Ret	38	(United Kingdom) Bradley Smith	Monster Yamaha Tech 3	Yamaha	19	Accident	6	
Ret	43	(Australia) Jack Miller	Estrella Galicia 0,0 Marc VDS	Honda	17	Accident	18	
Ret	4	(Italy) Andrea Dovizioso	Ducati Team	Ducati	15	Accident	5	
Ret	29	(Italy) Andrea Iannone	Ducati Team	Ducati	11	Accident Damage	3	
Ret	53	(Spain) Tito Rabat	Estrella Galicia 0,0 Marc VDS	Honda	7	Accident	20	
Ret	35	(United Kingdom) Cal Crutchlow	LCR Honda	Honda	6	Accident	9	
Ret	68	(Colombia) Yonny Hernández	Aspar Team MotoGP	Ducati	6	Accident	15	
Ret	45	(United Kingdom) Scott Redding	Octo Pramac Yakhnich	Ducati	5	Mechanical	14	

=== Moto2 ===
Pos.	No.	Rider	Manufacturer	Laps	Time/Retired	Grid	Points
1	40	(Spain) Álex Rins	Kalex	26	42:27.312	2	25
2	24	(Italy) Simone Corsi	Speed Up	26	+1.802	3	20
3	12	(Switzerland) Thomas Lüthi	Kalex	26	+4.608	1	16
4	21	(Italy) Franco Morbidelli	Kalex	26	+9.148	5	13
5	30	(Japan) Takaaki Nakagami	Kalex	26	+9.828	6	11
6	22	(United Kingdom) Sam Lowes	Kalex	26	+10.626	9	10
7	49	(Spain) Axel Pons	Kalex	26	+25.477	11	9
8	55	(Malaysia) Hafizh Syahrin	Kalex	26	+25.961	17	8
9	44	(Portugal) Miguel Oliveira	Kalex	26	+29.481	14	7
10	39	(Spain) Luis Salom	Kalex	26	+29.368 (Note: Demoted one position for exceeding track limits.)	18	6
11	19	(Belgium) Xavier Siméon	Speed Up	26	+29.573	20	5
12	10	(Italy) Luca Marini	Kalex	26	+29.773	10	4
13	77	(Switzerland) Dominique Aegerter	Kalex	26	+30.183	13	3
14	23	(Germany) Marcel Schrötter	Kalex	26	+30.244	12	2
15	97	(Spain) Xavi Vierge	Tech 3	26	+36.538	22	1
16	54	(Italy) Mattia Pasini	Kalex	26	+38.602	19	
17	7	(Italy) Lorenzo Baldassarri	Kalex	26	+44.911	7	
18	70	(Switzerland) Robin Mulhauser	Kalex	26	+45.297	25	
19	52	(United Kingdom) Danny Kent	Kalex	26	+45.755	21	
20	32	(Spain) Isaac Viñales	Tech 3	26	+50.278	23	
21	14	(Thailand) Ratthapark Wilairot	Kalex	26	+55.773	24	
22	33	(Italy) Alessandro Tonucci	Kalex	26	+1:01.790	26	
23	2	(Switzerland) Jesko Raffin	Kalex	26	+1:02.201	27	
24	5	(France) Johann Zarco	Kalex	26	+1:02.484	4	
25	69	(United States) Danny Eslick	Suter	26	+1:39.502	28	
Ret	73	(Spain) Álex Márquez	Kalex	13	Accident	16	
Ret	60	(Spain) Julián Simón	Speed Up	7	Accident	15	
Ret	94	(Germany) Jonas Folger	Kalex	1	Accident	8	
DNS	11	(Germany) Sandro Cortese	Kalex		Did not start (Knee Injury)		
OFFICIAL MOTO2 REPORT

=== Moto3 ===
Pos.	No.	Rider	Manufacturer	Laps	Time/Retired	Grid	Points
1	41	(South Africa) Brad Binder	KTM	24	41:31.041	2	25
2	5	(Italy) Romano Fenati	KTM	24	+0.099	5	20
3	9	(Spain) Jorge Navarro	Honda	24	+0.387	4	16
4	44	(Spain) Arón Canet	Honda	24	+1.354	3	13
5	8	(Italy) Nicolò Bulega	KTM	24	+7.147	6	11
6	20	(France) Fabio Quartararo	KTM	24	+7.616	8	10
7	16	(Italy) Andrea Migno	KTM	24	+8.016	17	9
8	23	(Italy) Niccolò Antonelli	Honda	24	+8.457	1	8
9	84	(Czech Republic) Jakub Kornfeil	Honda	24	+9.850	10	7
10	55	(Italy) Andrea Locatelli	KTM	24	+9.926	14	6
11	11	(Belgium) Livio Loi	Honda	24	+12.293	11	5
12	21	(Italy) Francesco Bagnaia	Mahindra	24	+13.738	19	4
13	58	(Spain) Juan Francisco Guevara	KTM	24	+13.511	7	3
14	89	(Malaysia) Khairul Idham Pawi	Honda	24	+13.907	9	2
15	24	(Japan) Tatsuki Suzuki	Mahindra	24	+14.382	12	1
16	64	(Netherlands) Bo Bendsneyder	KTM	24	+20.915	21	
17	4	(Italy) Fabio Di Giannantonio	Honda	24	+21.229	13	
18	88	(Spain) Jorge Martín	Mahindra	24	+24.091	23	
19	10	(France) Alexis Masbou	Peugeot	24	+38.782	15	
20	17	(United Kingdom) John McPhee	Peugeot	24	+38.852	25	
21	6	(Spain) María Herrera	KTM	24	+38.986	33	
22	43	(Italy) Stefano Valtulini	Mahindra	24	+54.550	27	
23	3	(Italy) Fabio Spiranelli	Mahindra	24	+1:03.526	31	
24	77	(Italy) Lorenzo Petrarca	Mahindra	24	+1:03.593	29	
25	36	(Spain) Joan Mir	KTM	24	+1:05.491	24	
Ret	19	(Argentina) Gabriel Rodrigo	KTM	23	Accident	20	
Ret	99	(France) Enzo Boulom	KTM	16	Accident	32	
Ret	76	(Japan) Hiroki Ono	Honda	15	Accident	16	
Ret	40	(South Africa) Darryn Binder	Mahindra	10	Accident Damage	22	
Ret	65	(Germany) Philipp Öttl	KTM	3	Accident	18	
Ret	95	(France) Jules Danilo	Honda	2	Accident Damage	26	
Ret	7	(Malaysia) Adam Norrodin	Honda	0	Accident	28	
Ret	98	(Czech Republic) Karel Hanika	Mahindra	0	Accident	30	
OFFICIAL MOTO3 REPORT

== Championship standings after the race (MotoGP) ==
Below are the standings for the top five riders and constructors after round five has concluded.

Riders' Championship standings

Pos.	Rider	Points
1	(Spain) Jorge Lorenzo	90
2	(Spain) Marc Marquez	85
3	(Italy) Valentino Rossi	78
4	(Spain) Dani Pedrosa	53
5	(Spain) Maverick Vinales	49

Constructors' Championship standings

Pos.	Constructor	Points
1	(Japan) Yamaha	115
2	(Japan) Honda	95
3	(Italy) Ducati	67
4	(Japan) Suzuki	55
5	(Italy) Aprilia	27

- Note: Only the top five positions are included for both sets of standings.

== Notes ==
Previous race: 2016 Spanish Grand Prix	FIM Grand Prix World Championship; 2016 season	Next race: 2016 Italian Grand Prix
Previous race: 2015 French Grand Prix	French motorcycle Grand Prix	Next race: 2017 French Grand Prix
