= Mahindra MGP3O =

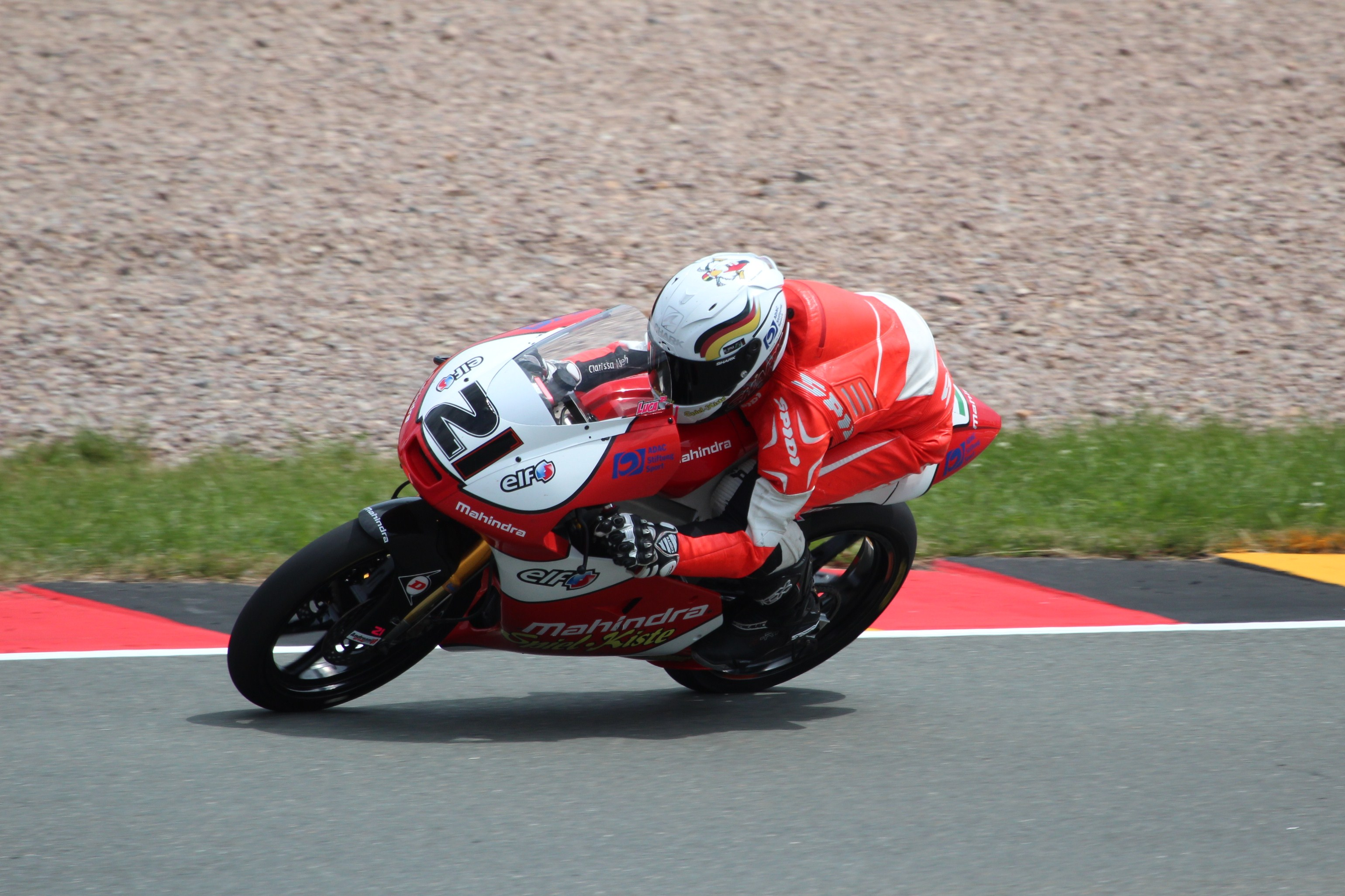
- Manufacturer: Mahindra
- Production: 2012–2017
- Class: Racing (Moto3 class)
- Engine: 249.8 cc (15.24 cu in)
- Bore / stroke: 70.0 mm × 52.2 mm (2.76 in × 2.06 in)

The Mahindra MGP3O is racing motorcycle manufactured by Mahindra which competed in the Moto3 class of Grand Prix motorcycle racing. From 2016 this bike, as well as being raced by Mahindra itself, was used by Peugeot under the name Peugeot MGP3O.

== Description ==
The first model of the MGP3O was produced by Engines Engineering using the Oral Engineering engine (engine also designed to be used on the old Aprilia RSV 125 chassis) and was used for the 2012 season, the chassis is a trellis, the braking is single disc both at the front and at the rear, the fairing is very tapered in the lower area, in a similar way to the motorcycle of the previous 125 class, the Mahindra 125, while the air intake on the fairing is divided in two and runs along the steering tube.

From 2013, the bike was developed by Suter, this resulted in a change of the frame which becomes an aluminum beam, the engine is replaced with a new unit and the fairing undergoes changes, including the air intake which is now it is not divided, while the solution of the passage of air through the steering tube remains, in addition there is a change from a single-disc front braking system to a double-disc one.
