= 2017 Italian motorcycle Grand Prix =

(Italy) 2017 Italian Grand Prix
Race details
- Race 6 of 18 races in the 2017 Grand Prix motorcycle racing season
- Date: 4 June 2017
- Official name: Gran Premio d'Italia Oakley
- Location: Autodromo Internazionale del Mugello
- Course: Permanent racing facility; 5.245 km (3.259 mi)

MotoGP
Pole position
Rider	(Spain) Maverick Viñales	Yamaha
Time	1:46.575	
Fastest lap
Rider	(Spain) Maverick Viñales	Yamaha
Time	1:47.643 on lap 6	
Podium
First	(Italy) Andrea Dovizioso	Ducati
Second	(Spain) Maverick Viñales	Yamaha
Third	(Italy) Danilo Petrucci	Ducati

Moto2
Pole position
Rider	(Italy) Franco Morbidelli	Kalex
Time	1:51.679	
Fastest lap
Rider	(Switzerland) Thomas Lüthi	Kalex
Time	1:52.084 on lap 8	
Podium
First	(Italy) Mattia Pasini	Kalex
Second	(Switzerland) Thomas Lüthi	Kalex
Third	(Spain) Álex Márquez	Kalex

Moto3
Pole position
Rider	(Spain) Jorge Martín (Note: Jorge Martín, who set the fastest time in qualifying, received a grid penalty which promoted John McPhee to the pole position grid slot.)	Honda
Time	1:57.176	
Fastest lap
Rider	(Spain) Arón Canet	Honda
Time	1:57.071 on lap 3	
Podium
First	(Italy) Andrea Migno	KTM
Second	(Italy) Fabio Di Giannantonio	Honda
Third	(Spain) Juan Francisco Guevara	KTM

The 2017 Italian motorcycle Grand Prix was the sixth round of the 2017 Grand Prix motorcycle racing season. It was held at the Autodromo Internazionale del Mugello in Scarperia on 4 June 2017.

== Classification ==
=== MotoGP ===
Pos.	No.	Rider	Team	Manufacturer	Laps	Time/Retired	Grid	Points
1	4	(Italy) Andrea Dovizioso	Ducati Team	Ducati	23	41:32.126	3	25
2	25	(Spain) Maverick Viñales	Movistar Yamaha MotoGP	Yamaha	23	+1.281	1	20
3	9	(Italy) Danilo Petrucci	Octo Pramac Racing	Ducati	23	+2.334	9	16
4	46	(Italy) Valentino Rossi	Movistar Yamaha MotoGP	Yamaha	23	+3.685	2	13
5	19	(Spain) Álvaro Bautista	Pull&Bear Aspar Team	Ducati	23	+5.802	8	11
6	93	(Spain) Marc Márquez	Repsol Honda Team	Honda	23	+5.885	6	10
7	5	(France) Johann Zarco	Monster Yamaha Tech 3	Yamaha	23	+13.205	11	9
8	99	(Spain) Jorge Lorenzo	Ducati Team	Ducati	23	+14.393	7	8
9	51	(Italy) Michele Pirro	Ducati Team	Ducati	23	+14.880	4	7
10	29	(Italy) Andrea Iannone	Team Suzuki Ecstar	Suzuki	23	+15.502	16	6
11	53	(Spain) Tito Rabat	EG 0,0 Marc VDS	Honda	23	+22.004	10	5
12	45	(United Kingdom) Scott Redding	Octo Pramac Racing	Ducati	23	+24.952	20	4
13	94	(Germany) Jonas Folger	Monster Yamaha Tech 3	Yamaha	23	+28.160	15	3
14	8	(Spain) Héctor Barberá	Reale Avintia Racing	Ducati	23	+30.676	14	2
15	43	(Australia) Jack Miller	EG 0,0 Marc VDS	Honda	23	+30.779	19	1
16	17	(Czech Republic) Karel Abraham	Pull&Bear Aspar Team	Ducati	23	+42.306	21	
17	50	(France) Sylvain Guintoli	Team Suzuki Ecstar	Suzuki	23	+46.294	24	
18	76	(France) Loris Baz	Reale Avintia Racing	Ducati	23	+50.731	17	
19	22	(United Kingdom) Sam Lowes	Aprilia Racing Team Gresini	Aprilia	23	+50.740	22	
20	38	(United Kingdom) Bradley Smith	Red Bull KTM Factory Racing	KTM	23	+50.897	23	
Ret	35	(United Kingdom) Cal Crutchlow	LCR Honda	Honda	22	Collision	13	
Ret	26	(Spain) Dani Pedrosa	Repsol Honda Team	Honda	22	Collision	5	
Ret	41	(Spain) Aleix Espargaró	Aprilia Racing Team Gresini	Aprilia	15	Gear Selection	12	
Ret	44	(Spain) Pol Espargaró	Red Bull KTM Factory Racing	KTM	13	Accident	18	

== Moto2 race report ==
In the Moto2 class, Mattia Pasini won his first Moto2 race and his first victory since the 250cc 2009 Italian Grand Prix.

=== Moto2 ===
Pos.	No.	Rider	Manufacturer	Laps	Time/Retired	Grid	Points
1	54	(Italy) Mattia Pasini	Kalex	21	39:30.974	3	25
2	12	(Switzerland) Thomas Lüthi	Kalex	21	+0.052	4	20
3	73	(Spain) Álex Márquez	Kalex	21	+0.136	2	16
4	21	(Italy) Franco Morbidelli	Kalex	21	+3.643	1	13
5	44	(Portugal) Miguel Oliveira	KTM	21	+5.124	9	11
6	10	(Italy) Luca Marini	Kalex	21	+13.266	6	10
7	77	(Switzerland) Dominique Aegerter	Suter	21	+13.299	18	9
8	24	(Italy) Simone Corsi	Speed Up	21	+13.703	10	8
9	9	(Spain) Jorge Navarro	Kalex	21	+15.485	7	7
10	41	(South Africa) Brad Binder	KTM	21	+16.036	23	6
11	23	(Germany) Marcel Schrötter	Suter	21	+16.039	13	5
12	55	(Malaysia) Hafizh Syahrin	Kalex	21	+16.310	20	4
13	32	(Spain) Isaac Viñales	Kalex	21	+17.702	19	3
14	87	(Australia) Remy Gardner	Tech 3	21	+21.335	11	2
15	19	(Belgium) Xavier Siméon	Kalex	21	+22.740	21	1
16	5	(Italy) Andrea Locatelli	Kalex	21	+22.781	15	
17	68	(Colombia) Yonny Hernández	Kalex	21	+22.804	14	
18	40	(France) Fabio Quartararo	Kalex	21	+23.705	22	
19	11	(Germany) Sandro Cortese	Suter	21	+25.336	17	
20	57	(Spain) Edgar Pons	Kalex	21	+28.534	30	
21	49	(Spain) Axel Pons	Kalex	21	+29.512	24	
22	42	(Italy) Francesco Bagnaia	Kalex	21	+40.336	16	
23	2	(Switzerland) Jesko Raffin	Kalex	21	+40.351	25	
24	45	(Japan) Tetsuta Nagashima	Kalex	21	+40.486	27	
25	37	(Spain) Augusto Fernández	Speed Up	21	+45.382	28	
26	89	(Malaysia) Khairul Idham Pawi	Kalex	21	+45.385	26	
27	6	(United Kingdom) Tarran Mackenzie	Suter	21	+1:07.733	32	
28	22	(Italy) Federico Fuligni	Kalex	21	+1:07.742	31	
Ret	52	(United Kingdom) Danny Kent	Kalex	9	Accident	12	
Ret	62	(Italy) Stefano Manzi	Kalex	9	Accident	29	
Ret	30	(Japan) Takaaki Nakagami	Kalex	0	Collision	5	
Ret	7	(Italy) Lorenzo Baldassarri	Kalex	0	Accident	8	
DNS	97	(Spain) Xavi Vierge	Tech 3		Did not start		
OFFICIAL MOTO2 REPORT

- Xavi Vierge was declared unfit to start the race due to a thoracic trauma following a crash in qualifying.

=== Moto3 ===
Pos.	No.	Rider	Manufacturer	Laps	Time/Retired	Grid	Points
1	16	(Italy) Andrea Migno	KTM	20	39:43.963	12	25
2	21	(Italy) Fabio Di Giannantonio	Honda	20	+0.037	3	20
3	58	(Spain) Juan Francisco Guevara	KTM	20	+0.166	5	16
4	40	(South Africa) Darryn Binder	KTM	20	+0.362	15	13
5	44	(Spain) Arón Canet	Honda	20	+0.364	14	11
6	17	(United Kingdom) John McPhee	Honda	20	+0.419	1	10
7	36	(Spain) Joan Mir	Honda	20	+0.556	2	9
8	71	(Japan) Ayumu Sasaki	Honda	20	+0.710	24	8
9	42	(Spain) Marcos Ramírez	KTM	20	+0.772	7	7
10	8	(Italy) Nicolò Bulega	KTM	20	+1.125	4	6
11	33	(Italy) Enea Bastianini	Honda	20	+1.229	17	5
12	64	(Netherlands) Bo Bendsneyder	KTM	20	+1.261	8	4
13	5	(Italy) Romano Fenati	Honda	20	+1.461	6	3
14	65	(Germany) Philipp Öttl	KTM	20	+1.524	16	2
15	88	(Spain) Jorge Martín	Honda	20	+1.553	13	1
16	23	(Italy) Niccolò Antonelli	KTM	20	+1.858	11	
17	12	(Italy) Marco Bezzecchi	Mahindra	20	+2.259	23	
18	7	(Malaysia) Adam Norrodin	Honda	20	+2.272	22	
19	48	(Italy) Lorenzo Dalla Porta	Mahindra	20	+2.319	18	
20	84	(Czech Republic) Jakub Kornfeil	Peugeot	20	+3.053	20	
21	14	(Italy) Tony Arbolino	Honda	20	+3.476	21	
22	96	(Italy) Manuel Pagliani	Mahindra	20	+11.162	30	
23	11	(Belgium) Livio Loi	Honda	20	+17.713	25	
24	41	(Thailand) Nakarin Atiratphuvapat	Honda	20	+37.687	26	
25	27	(Japan) Kaito Toba	Honda	20	+37.688	31	
26	6	(Spain) María Herrera	KTM	20	+37.776	28	
27	4	(Finland) Patrik Pulkkinen	Peugeot	20	+37.887	27	
Ret	24	(Japan) Tatsuki Suzuki	Honda	19	Accident	9	
Ret	75	(Spain) Albert Arenas	Mahindra	19	Accident	19	
Ret	95	(France) Jules Danilo	Honda	9	Accident	10	
Ret	30	(Italy) Edoardo Sintoni	Mahindra	7	Retirement	29	
OFFICIAL MOTO3 REPORT

== Championship standings after the race ==
=== MotoGP ===
Below are the standings for the top five riders and constructors after round six has concluded.

Riders' Championship standings

Pos.	Rider	Points
1	(Spain) Maverick Viñales	105
2	(Italy) Andrea Dovizioso	79
3	(Italy) Valentino Rossi	75
4	(Spain) Marc Márquez	68
5	(Spain) Dani Pedrosa	68

Constructors' Championship standings

Pos.	Constructor	Points
1	(Japan) Yamaha	128
2	(Japan) Honda	105
3	(Italy) Ducati	97
4	(Japan) Suzuki	28
5	(Italy) Aprilia	19

- Note: Only the top five positions are included for both sets of standings.

=== Moto2 ===
Pos.	Rider	Points
1	(Italy) Franco Morbidelli	113
2	(Switzerland) Thomas Lüthi	100
3	(Spain) Álex Márquez	78
4	(Portugal) Miguel Oliveira	70
5	(Italy) Francesco Bagnaia	53
6	(Italy) Mattia Pasini	49
7	(Switzerland) Dominique Aegerter	46
8	(Japan) Takaaki Nakagami	41
9	(Italy) Luca Marini	41
10	(Italy) Simone Corsi	35

=== Moto3 ===
Pos.	Rider	Points
1	(Spain) Joan Mir	108
2	(Spain) Arón Canet	74
3	(Italy) Fabio Di Giannantonio	71
4	(Italy) Romano Fenati	68
5	(Italy) Andrea Migno	68
6	(United Kingdom) John McPhee	63
7	(Spain) Jorge Martín	60
8	(Spain) Juan Francisco Guevara	50
9	(Spain) Marcos Ramírez	43
10	(Italy) Enea Bastianini	36

== Notes ==
Previous race: 2017 French Grand Prix	FIM Grand Prix World Championship; 2017 season	Next race: 2017 Catalan Grand Prix
Previous race: 2016 Italian Grand Prix	Italian motorcycle Grand Prix	Next race: 2018 Italian Grand Prix
