= Hafiq Azmi =

Malaysian motorcycle racer

- Nationality: Malaysian
- Born: 8 December 1996 (age 29); Kuala Lumpur, Malaysia
- Current team: ONEXOX TKKR Racing Team
- Bike number: 80
Motorcycle racing career statistics
Moto3 World Championship
Active years	2013–2014, 2016
Manufacturers	KTM, FTR Honda, Peugeot
2016 championship position	33rd (5 pts)
Starts / Wins / Podiums / Poles / F. laps / Points; 23 / 0 / 0 / 0 / 0 / 8

Amirul Hafiq Azmi (born 8 December 1996) is a Malaysian motorcycle racer. Hafiq competed in two seasons of the New Zealand 125GP championship in 2011 and 2012, winning the 2012 New Zealand 125GP Grand Prix title and coming third overall in the NZ championship after only completing half of the season. He has competed in the Moto3 World Championship, the Red Bull MotoGP Rookies Cup in 2011 and 2012 and the CEV Moto3 series.

== Career statistics ==
=== Red Bull MotoGP Rookies Cup ===
==== Races by year ====
(key) (Races in bold indicate pole position, races in italics indicate fastest lap)

Year	1	2	3	4	5	6	7	8	9	10	11	12	13	14	15	Pos	Pts
2011	SPA1; 16	SPA2; Ret	POR1; Ret	POR2; 15	GBR1; 5	GBR2; 8	NED1; 11	NED2; Ret	ITA; 17	GER1; 11	GER2; 11	CZE1; 7	CZE2; 19	RSM; 19		18th	44
2012	SPA1; 14	SPA2; 7	POR1; 10	POR2; 7	GBR1; 17	GBR2; 13	NED1; 11	NED2; Ret	GER1; 8	GER2; 17	CZE1; 14	CZE2; 9	RSM; 11	ARA1; 9	ARA2; Ret	16th	63

=== FIM CEV Moto3 Championship ===
==== Races by year ====
(key) (Races in bold indicate pole position; races in italics indicate fastest lap)

Year	Bike	1	2	3	4	5	6	7	8	9	Pos	Pts
2013	KTM	CAT1; Ret	CAT2; 15	ARA; Ret	ALB1; 9	ALB2; Ret	NAV; 13	VAL1; DNS	VAL1; Ret	JER; 4	17th	24

=== Grand Prix motorcycle racing ===
==== By season ====
Season	Class	Motorcycle	Team	Race	Win	Podium	Pole	FLap	Pts	Plcd
2013	Moto3	KTM	Touchline-SIC-Ajo	4	0	0	0	0	0	NC
2013	Moto3	FTR Honda	La Fonte Tascaracing	4	0	0	0	0	0	NC
2014	Moto3	KTM	SIC-AJO	18	0	0	0	0	3	28th
2016	Moto3	Peugeot	Peugeot MC Saxoprint	1	0	0	0	0	5	33rd
Total				**23**	**0**	**0**	**0**	**0**	**8**	

==== Races by year ====
Year	Class	Bike	1	2	3	4	5	6	7	8	9	10	11	12	13	14	15	16	17	18	Pos	Points
2013	Moto3	KTM	QAT	AME	SPA	FRA	ITA	CAT	NED	GER	INP	CZE	GBR	RSM	ARA	MAL; Ret					NC	0
2013	Moto3	FTR Honda															AUS; 29	JPN; 26	VAL; 25		NC	0
2014	Moto3	KTM	QAT; Ret	AME; 24	ARG; 16	SPA; 24	FRA; 16	ITA; Ret	CAT; Ret	NED; 29	GER; 18	INP; 24	CZE; 28	GBR; 20	RSM; 23	ARA; 19	JPN; 18	AUS; 18	MAL; 13	VAL; 23	28th	3
2016	Moto3	Peugeot	QAT	ARG	AME	SPA	FRA	ITA	CAT	NED	GER	AUT	CZE	GBR	RSM	ARA	JPN	AUS	MAL; 11	VAL	33rd	5
