= 2012 Red Bull MotoGP Rookies Cup =

Motorcycle racing competition

2012 Red Bull MotoGP Rookies Cup season

Seasons
- ← 2011 2013 →

The 2012 Red Bull MotoGP Rookies Cup season was the sixth season of the Red Bull MotoGP Rookies Cup. The season began at Circuito de Jerez on 28 April and ended on 30 September at MotorLand Aragón after 15 races. The races, contested by the riders on equal KTM 125cc machinery for the last season before switching to the 250cc 4-stroke Moto3 bikes for 2013, were held at eight meetings on the Grand Prix motorcycle racing calendar.

German rider Florian Alt won the championship, securing the title with a third place in the first Aragon race.

== Calendar ==
2012 calendar
Round	Date	Circuit	Pole position	Fastest lap	Race winner
1	28 April	(Spain) Jerez	(Spain) Marcos Ramírez	(Spain) Diego Pérez	(Germany) Florian Alt
1	29 April	(Spain) Jerez	(Spain) Marcos Ramírez	(United States) Joe Roberts	(Italy) Lorenzo Baldassarri
2	5 May	(Portugal) Estoril	(Portugal) Ivo Lopes	(United Kingdom) Kyle Ryde	(Netherlands) Scott Deroue
2	6 May	(Portugal) Estoril	(Portugal) Ivo Lopes	(Czech Republic) Karel Hanika	(Netherlands) Scott Deroue
3	16 June	(United Kingdom) Silverstone	(Czech Republic) Karel Hanika	(Italy) Stefano Manzi	(Germany) Florian Alt
3	17 June	(United Kingdom) Silverstone	(Czech Republic) Karel Hanika	(Netherlands) Scott Deroue	(Germany) Philipp Öttl
4	29 June	(Netherlands) Assen	(Czech Republic) Karel Hanika	(Spain) Marcos Ramírez	(Germany) Florian Alt
4	30 June	(Netherlands) Assen	(Czech Republic) Karel Hanika	(Belgium) Livio Loi	(Germany) Florian Alt
5	7 July	(Germany) Sachsenring	(Italy) Nicolò Castellini	(Netherlands) Scott Deroue	(Netherlands) Scott Deroue
5	8 July	(Germany) Sachsenring	(Italy) Nicolò Castellini	(Malaysia) Hafiq Azmi	(Austria) Lukas Trautmann
6	25 August	(Czech Republic) Brno	(Czech Republic) Karel Hanika	(Czech Republic) Karel Hanika	(Czech Republic) Karel Hanika
6	26 August	(Czech Republic) Brno	(Czech Republic) Karel Hanika	(Belgium) Livio Loi	(Belgium) Livio Loi
7	15 September	(San Marino) Misano	(United Kingdom) Bradley Ray	(Germany) Philipp Öttl	(Czech Republic) Karel Hanika
8	29 September	(Spain) Aragon	(Czech Republic) Karel Hanika	(Belgium) Livio Loi	(Austria) Lukas Trautmann
8	30 September	(Spain) Aragon	(Czech Republic) Karel Hanika	(Spain) Jorge Martín	(Czech Republic) Karel Hanika

== Entry list ==
2012 entry list
No.	Rider	Rounds
3	(Spain) Diego Pérez	All
5	(Germany) Philipp Öttl	All
7	(Italy) Lorenzo Baldassarri	All
8	(Malaysia) Hafiq Azmi	All
11	(Belgium) Livio Loi	All
18	(Spain) Aarón España	All
19	(United Kingdom) Tarran Mackenzie	3–8
21	(Italy) Filippo Scalbi	All
24	(Spain) Marcos Ramírez	All
25	(Germany) Willi Albert	1–6
27	(United States) Joe Roberts	All
28	(United Kingdom) Bradley Ray	All
29	(Italy) Stefano Manzi	All
34	(South Africa) Jordan Weaving	All
46	(Japan) Yui Watanabe	All
47	(Italy) Nicolò Castellini	All
50	(Austria) Lukas Trautmann	All
66	(Germany) Florian Alt	All
75	(Portugal) Ivo Lopes	All
77	(United Kingdom) Kyle Ryde	All
88	(Spain) Jorge Martín	1–6, 8
94	(France) Simon Danilo	1–6
95	(Netherlands) Scott Deroue	All
98	(Czech Republic) Karel Hanika	All

== Championship standings ==
Points were awarded to the top fifteen finishers. Rider had to finish the race to earn points.

Position	1st	2nd	3rd	4th	5th	6th	7th	8th	9th	10th	11th	12th	13th	14th	15th
Points	25	20	16	13	11	10	9	8	7	6	5	4	3	2	1

Pos.	Rider	JER (Spain)		EST (Portugal)		SIL (United Kingdom)		ASS (Netherlands)		SAC (Germany)		BRN (Czech Republic)		MIS (San Marino)	ARA (Spain)		Pts
1	(Germany) Florian Alt	1	Ret	2	Ret	1	4	1	1	5	4	3	4	5	3	2	233
2	(Netherlands) Scott Deroue	10	Ret	1	1	5	2	5	7	1	3	9	Ret	4	Ret	7	177
3	(Czech Republic) Karel Hanika	Ret	16	3	3	**10**	**3**	**6**	**Ret**	3	9	**1**	**16**	1	**5**	**1**	162
4	(Germany) Philipp Öttl	6	4	8	2	4	1	2	3	7	Ret	10	DNS	8	NC	5	159
5	(Austria) Lukas Trautmann	11	9	11	8	9	18	Ret	20	4	1	5	5	2	1	3	153
6	(Spain) Marcos Ramírez	**2**	**6**	7	Ret	14	9	8	2	6	5	4	12	10	2	4	153
7	(United Kingdom) Bradley Ray	Ret	5	5	19	2	6	7	5	20	10	7	7	**9**	4	9	123
8	(Italy) Lorenzo Baldassarri	8	1	14	10	12	7	Ret	11	11	Ret	8	6	7	Ret	6	101
9	(United States) Joe Roberts	7	Ret	9	5	11	12	4	12	13	11	11	2	12	8	13	101
10	(Portugal) Ivo Lopes	5	2	**4**	**Ret**	Ret	5	3	8	15	6	20	8	Ret	Ret	15	99
11	(Belgium) Livio Loi	13	8	20	11	DNS	17	22	10	12	7	2	1	3	Ret	NC	96
12	(Spain) Jorge Martín	Ret	12	12	6	6	11	10	6	19	8	6	Ret		7	10	82
13	(Italy) Stefano Manzi	15	17	19	12	Ret	Ret	9	14	9	2	22	3	Ret	6	8	75
14	(Spain) Diego Pérez	3	3	16	18	8	15	14	18	18	13	12	10	6	11	Ret	71
15	(United Kingdom) Kyle Ryde	4	Ret	6	4	3	8	12	Ret	14	Ret	17	Ret	17	12	16	70
16	(Malaysia) Hafiq Azmi	14	7	10	7	17	13	11	Ret	8	17	14	9	11	9	Ret	63
17	(Spain) Aarón España	9	Ret	13	9	7	16	18	15	10	12	18	13	13	14	17	45
18	(Germany) Willi Albert	12	Ret	17	15	15	21	16	9	2	18	13	Ret				36
19	(France) Simon Danilo	Ret	13	Ret	Ret	13	19	13	4	22	Ret	Ret	DNS				22
20	(South Africa) Jordan Weaving	Ret	11	15	16	18	10	19	19	21	14	19	14	16	Ret	11	21
21	(Italy) Nicolò Castellini	Ret	10	18	13	DNS	14	17	13	**Ret**	**Ret**	16	Ret	14	15	18	17
22	(Japan) Yui Watanabe	Ret	15	21	14	DNS	DNS	21	Ret	17	19	15	11	18	13	12	16
23	(United Kingdom) Tarran Mackenzie					19	20	20	16	Ret	15	21	15	15	10	14	11
24	(Italy) Filippo Scalbi	16	14	22	17	16	22	15	17	16	16	Ret	17	19	Ret	19	3
Pos.	Rider	JER (Spain)		EST (Portugal)		SIL (United Kingdom)		ASS (Netherlands)		SAC (Germany)		BRN (Czech Republic)		MIS (San Marino)	ARA (Spain)		Pts

Colour	Result
Gold	Winner
Silver	Second place
Bronze	Third place
Green	Points classification
Blue	Non-points classification
Blue	Non-classified finish (NC)
Purple	Retired, not classified (Ret)
Red	Did not qualify (DNQ)
Red	Did not pre-qualify (DNPQ)
Black	Disqualified (DSQ)
White	Did not start (DNS)
White	Withdrew (WD)
White	Race cancelled (C)
Blank	Did not practice (DNP)
Blank	Did not arrive (DNA)
Blank	Excluded (EX)

**Bold** – Pole position
Italics – Fastest lap
