= Florian Alt =

German motorcycle racer (born 1996)

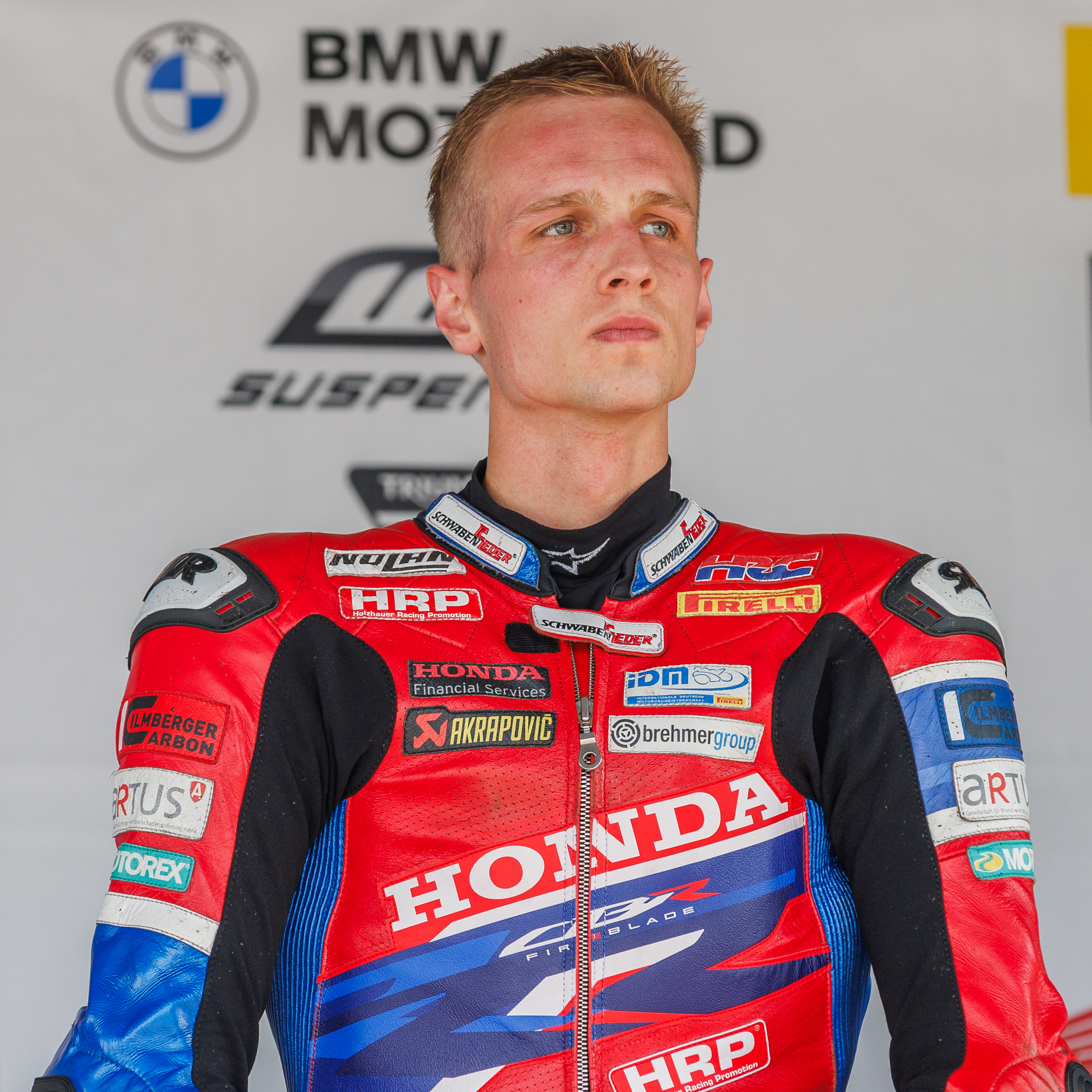
- Alt in 2024
- Nationality: German
- Born: 30 April 1996 (age 30); Gummersbach, Germany
- Current team: Holzhauer Racing Promotion
- Bike number: 66
- Website: https://flo66.de/en/
Motorcycle racing career statistics
Moto2 World Championship
Active years	2015
Manufacturers	Suter
Championships	0
2015 championship position	NC (0 pts)
Starts / Wins / Podiums / Poles / F. laps / Points; 17 / 0 / 0 / 0 / 1 / 0
Moto3 World Championship
Active years	2013
Manufacturers	Kalex KTM
Championships	0
2013 championship position	NC (0 pts)
Starts / Wins / Podiums / Poles / F. laps / Points; 12 / 0 / 0 / 0 / 0 / 0
Superbike World Championship
Active years	2023
Manufacturers	Honda
Championships	0
2023 championship position	NC (0 pts)
Starts / Wins / Podiums / Poles / F. laps / Points; 3 / 0 / 0 / 0 / 0 / 0

Florian Alt (born 30 April 1996 in Gummersbach) is a German Grand Prix motorcycle racer. He currently competes in the EuroMoto Superbike Championship aboard a Honda CBR1000RR. He was the 2012 Red Bull MotoGP Rookies Cup champion. He has previously competed in the FIM Endurance World Championship, the CEV Moto2 Championship, and has finished runner-up in 2014 and the IDM 125GP Championship.

In 2022, Alt won the Bol d'Or 24 hour endurance race together with teammates Erwan Nigon und Steven Odendaal on a Yamaha R1. In the same year, he finished a career best of third in the Endurance World Championship.

In 2023, Alt won the IDM Superbike Championship, racing for Holzhauer Racing Promotion.

== Career statistics ==
=== Career highlights ===
- 2017 - NC, European Superstock 1000 Championship, Yamaha YZF-R1
- 2023 - 1st, IDM Superbike Championship, Honda CBR1000RR

=== Red Bull MotoGP Rookies Cup ===
==== Races by year ====
(key) (Races in bold indicate pole position, races in italics indicate fastest lap)

Year	1	2	3	4	5	6	7	8	9	10	11	12	13	14	15	Pos	Pts
2010	SPA1; 6	SPA2; 9	ITA; Ret	NED1; Ret	NED2; 14	GER1; 10	GER2; 10	CZE1; 9	CZE2; 8	RSM; 17						11th	46
2011	SPA1; 5	SPA2; Ret	POR1	POR2	GBR1; 8	GBR2; Ret	NED1; 17	NED2; 3	ITA; 6	GER1; 14	GER2; 2	**CZE1**; 11	**CZE2**; 8	**RSM**; 1		6th	105
2012	SPA1; 1	SPA2; Ret	POR1; 2	POR2; Ret	GBR1; 1	GBR2; 4	NED1; 1	NED2; 1	GER1; 5	GER2; 4	CZE1; 3	CZE2; 4	RSM; 5	ARA1; 3	ARA2; 2	1st	233

=== FIM CEV Moto2 Championship ===
==== Races by year ====
(key) (Races in bold indicate pole position, races in italics indicate fastest lap)

Year	Bike	1	2	3	4	5	6	7	8	9	10	Pos	Pts
2014	Kalex	JER; 2	ARA1; 4	ARA2; 2	**CAT**; 2	ALB; 4	NAV1; DNF	NAV2; 2	ALG1; 1	ALG2; DNF	VAL; 2	2nd	151

=== Grand Prix motorcycle racing ===
==== By season ====
Season	Class	Motorcycle	Team	Race	Win	Podium	Pole	FLap	Pts	Plcd
2013	Moto3	Kalex KTM	Kiefer Racing	12	0	0	0	0	0	NC
2015	Moto2	Suter	E-Motion IodaRacing Team	17	0	0	0	1	0	NC
Total				**29**	**0**	**0**	**0**	**1**	**0**	

==== Races by year ====
(key) (Races in bold indicate pole position; races in italics indicate fastest lap)

Year	Class	Bike	1	2	3	4	5	6	7	8	9	10	11	12	13	14	15	16	17	18	Pos	Pts
2013	Moto3	Kalex KTM	QAT; 25	AME; Ret	SPA; Ret	FRA; Ret	ITA	CAT; DNS	NED; 30	GER; 29	INP; 18	CZE; 27	GBR; 25	RSM; Ret	ARA; Ret	MAL; DNS	AUS	JPN	VAL; 26		NC	0
2015	Moto2	Suter	QAT; 21	AME; 25	ARG; 25	SPA; 24	FRA; 23	ITA; 24	CAT; 21	NED; Ret	GER; DNS	INP; 19	CZE; Ret	GBR; 24	RSM; 22	ARA; 21	JPN; 21	AUS; Ret	MAL; 26	VAL; 20	NC	0

=== European Superstock 1000 Championship ===
==== Races by year ====
(key) (Races in bold indicate pole position) (Races in italics indicate fastest lap)

Year	Bike	1	2	3	4	5	6	7	8	9	Pos	Pts
2017	Yamaha	ARA	NED	IMO	DON	MIS	LAU	ALG	MAG	JER; Ret	NC	0

=== Superbike World Championship ===
==== Races by year ====
(key) (Races in bold indicate pole position; races in italics indicate fastest lap)

Year	Bike	1			2			3			4			5			6			7			8			9			10			11			12			13			Pos	Pts
Year	Bike	R1	SR	R2	R1	SR	R2	R1	SR	R2	R1	SR	R2	R1	SR	R2	R1	SR	R2	R1	SR	R2	R1	SR	R2	R1	SR	R2	R1	SR	R2	R1	SR	R2	R1	SR	R2	R1	SR	R2	Pos	Pts
2023	Honda	AUS	AUS	AUS	INA	INA	INA	NED	NED	NED	SPA	SPA	SPA	ITA	ITA	ITA	GBR	GBR	GBR	IMO	IMO	IMO	CZE	CZE	CZE	FRA	FRA	FRA	SPA	SPA	SPA	POR	POR	POR	JER; 19	JER; 18	JER; 22				NC	0

=== FIM Endurance World Championship ===
==== By team ====
Year	Team	Bike	Rider	TC
2022	(France) Viltais Racing Igol	Yamaha YZF-R1	(France) Erwan Nigon (Germany) Florian Alt (South Africa) Steven Odendaal	3rd

Sporting positions
Preceded by Lorenzo Baldassarri	Red Bull MotoGP Rookies Cup; Champion; 2012	Succeeded by Karel Hanika
