= Robin Mulhauser =

Swiss motorcycle racer (born 1991)

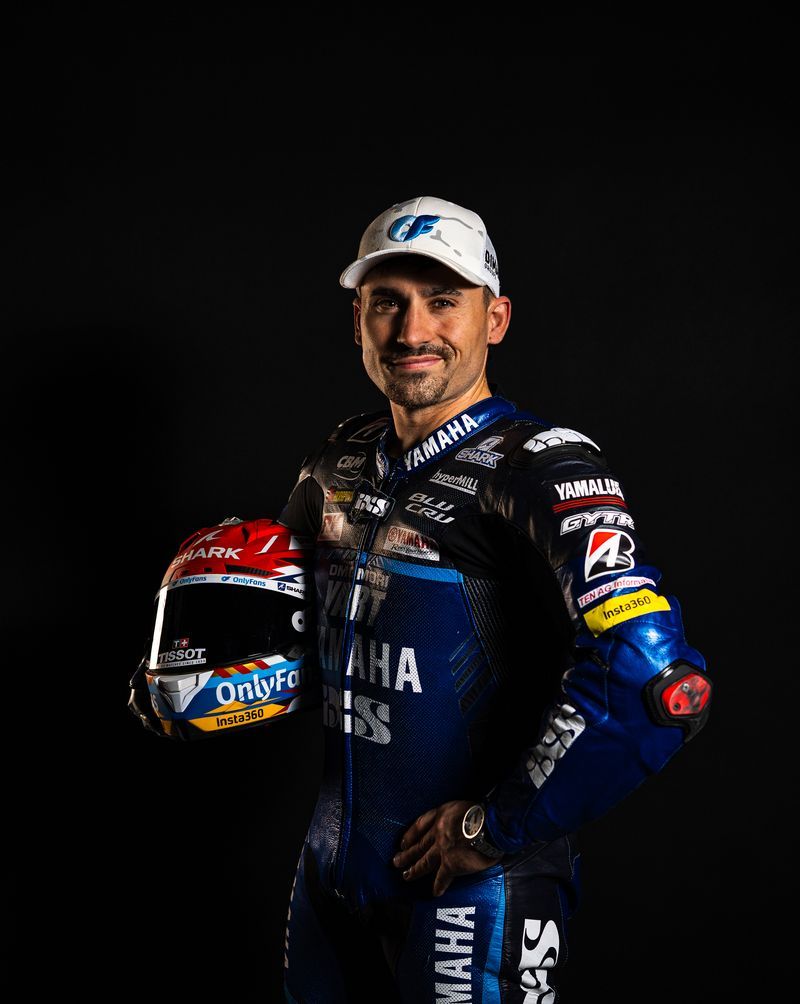
- Nationality: Swiss
- Born: November 7, 1991 (age 35); Fribourg, Switzerland
- Current team: Yamaha Austrian Racing Team - YART
- Bike number: 1
- Website: robinmulhauser.ch
Motorcycle racing career statistics
Moto2 World Championship
Active years	2013–2016
Manufacturers	Suter, Kalex
2016 championship position	30th (4 pt)
Starts / Wins / Podiums / Poles / F. laps / Points; 53 / 0 / 0 / 0 / 0 / 5
Supersport World Championship
Active years	2012, 2017
Manufacturers	Yamaha, Honda
2017 championship position	34th (6 pts)
Starts / Wins / Podiums / Poles / F. laps / Points; 8 / 0 / 0 / 0 / 0 / 6

Robin Mulhauser (born 7 November 1991) is a Swiss motorcycle racer from Fribourg. He competed in the Moto2 World Championship from 2013 to 2016, then transitioned to endurance racing. He won the FIM EWC Superstock World Cup with the French team Moto Ain in the 2018–19 and 2019–20 seasons. He later served as an official reserve rider for Yamalube Yamaha Austria Racing Team (YART) Yamaha EWC during the team's FIM Endurance World Championship title-winning seasons in 2023 and 2025.

== Racing career ==
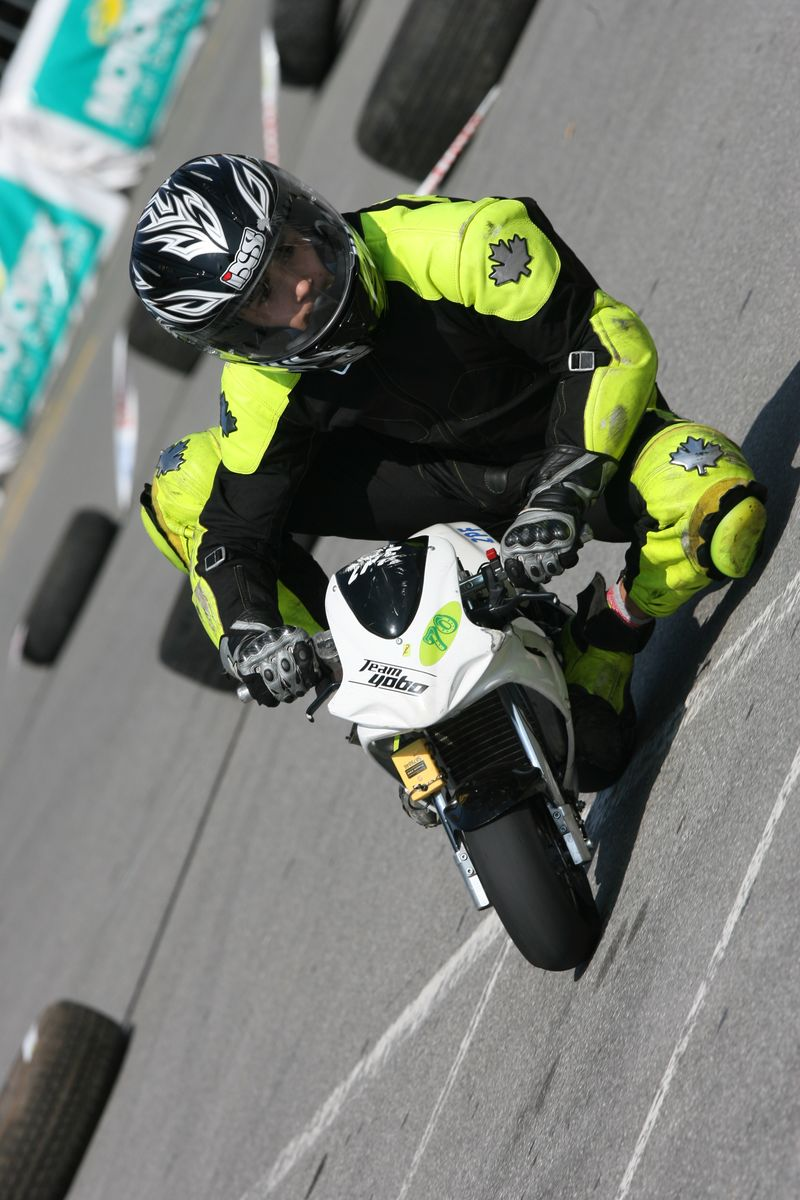
Robin Mulhauser competing in the Pocket Bike Swiss Championship (Junior B), 2007

=== Early years (2007—2011) ===
Mulhauser started racing pocket bikes in 2007. He later competed in IDM 125cc in Germany for three years.

=== European Superstock 600 & WorldSSP (2012—2013) ===
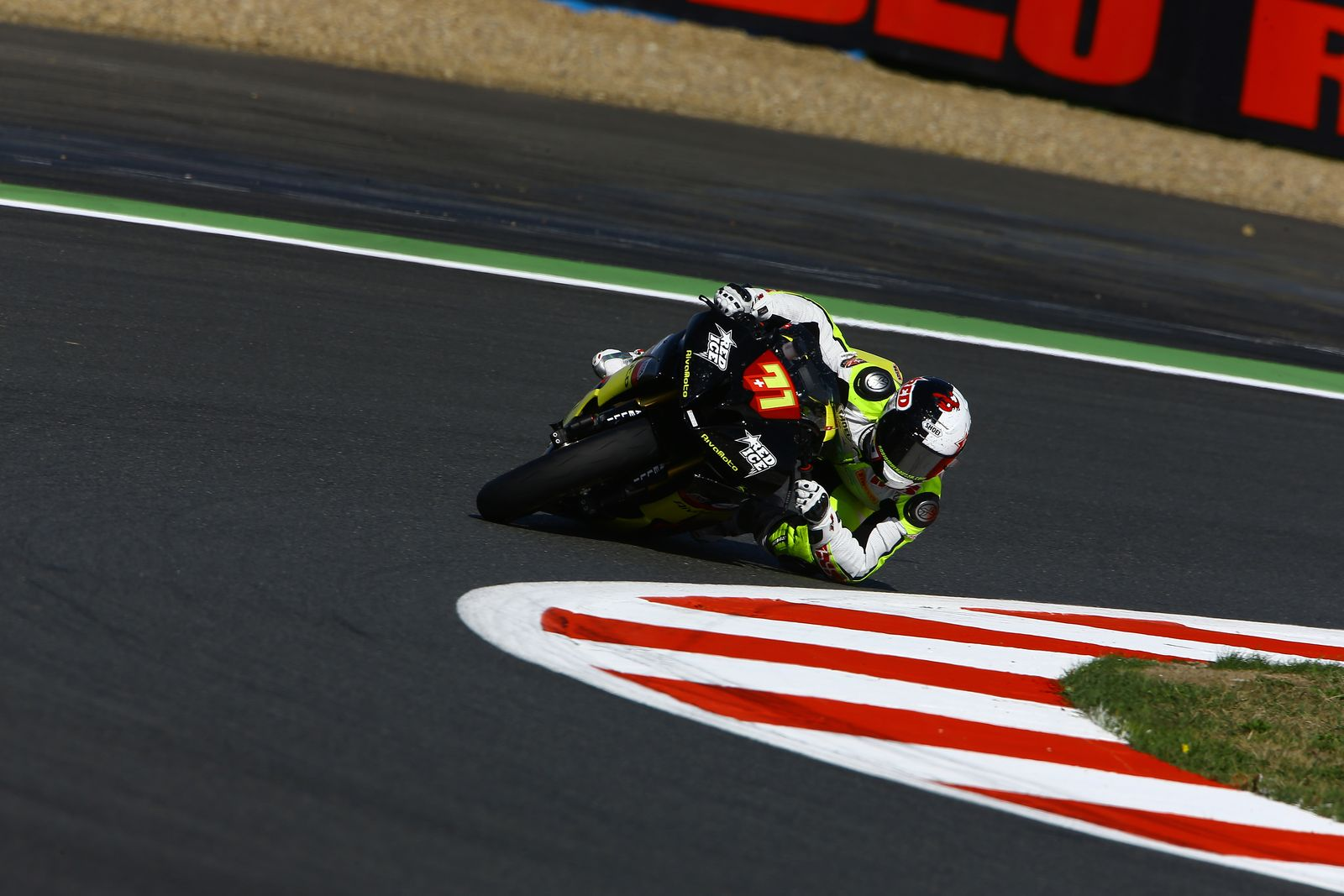
Robin Mulhauser during his debut season in the European Superstock 600 Championship at Magny-Cours in 2012

In 2012, he competed in the European Superstock 600 Championship. He finished third at Silverstone and placed seventh in the overall standings in 2013.

=== Moto2 World Championship (2013 – 2016) ===
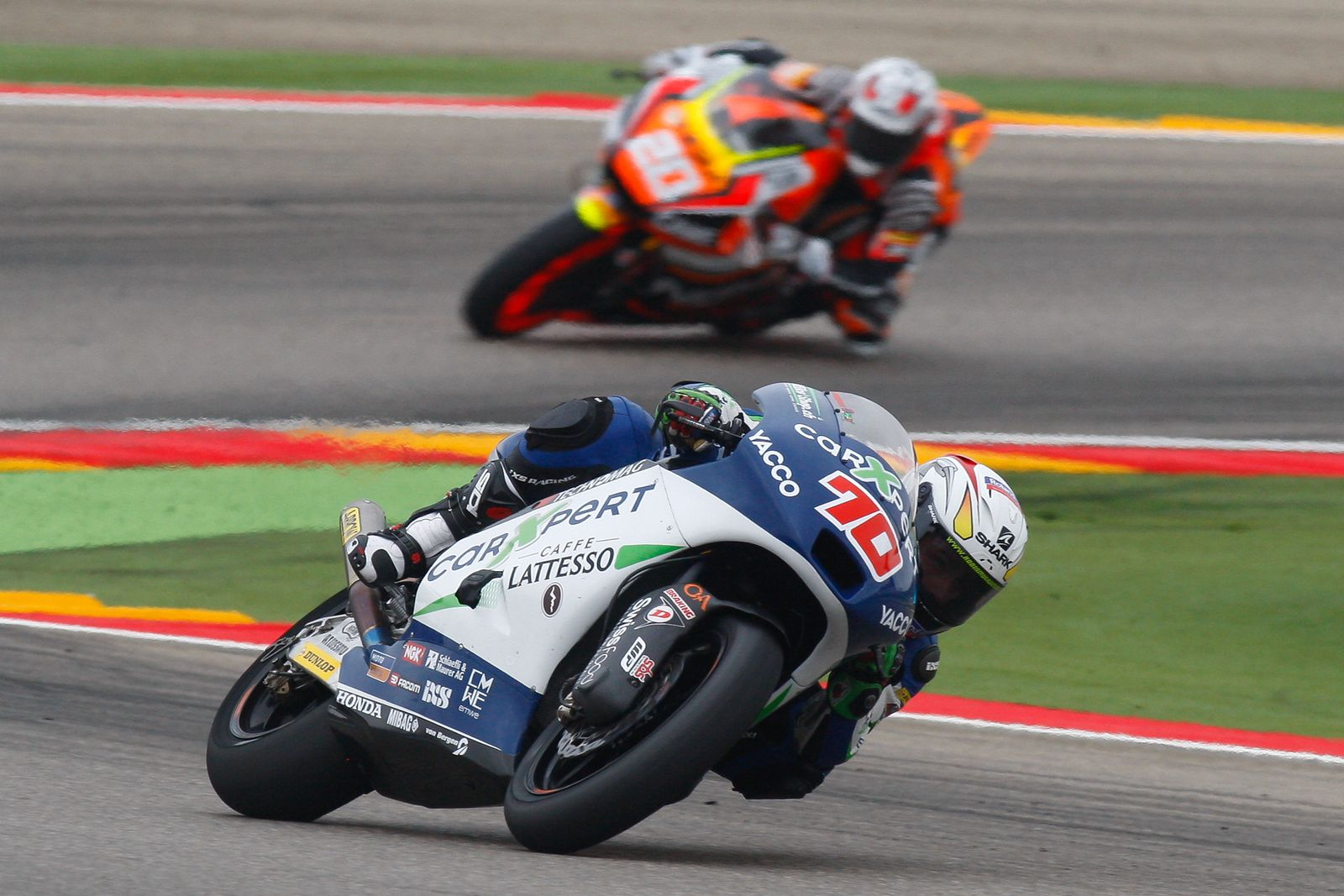
Robin Mulhauser during his debut Moto2 World Championship season at the Valencian Grand Prix, 2014.

In September 2013, Mulhauser took part in a test at Le Castellet in southern France with the Technomag carXpert team. He made his Motorcycle World Championship debut later that month at the Aragón Grand Prix, replacing Randy Krummenacher, who was injured in a crash. In 2014, he competed in the Moto2 class for Technomag carXpert alongside Dominique Aegerter.

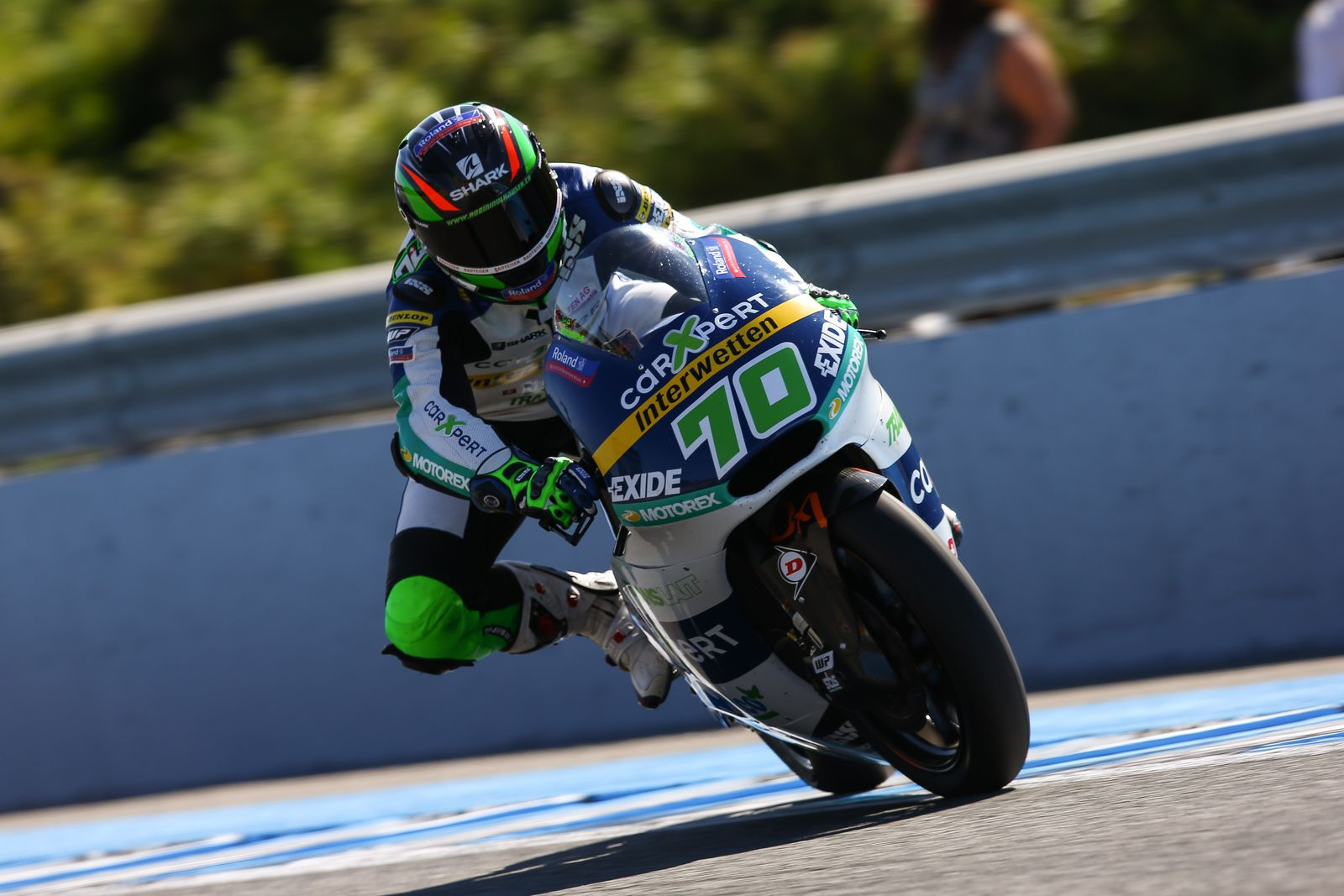
Robin Mulhauser during his second Moto2 World Championship season at the Spanish Grand Prix in Jerez in 2015

In 2015, Mulhauser competed full-time in the Moto2 World Championship for Technomag Racing Interwetten. He scored his first World Championship point at the Indianapolis Grand Prix, finishing 15th, and placed 28th in the overall standings. He extended his contract for another season and raced in the Moto2 World Championship for CarXpert Interwetten. He finished 30th overall with four points, with his best result being 13th place at the German Grand Prix.

At the 2016 Grand Prix of the Americas in Austin, Mulhauser was involved in a collision with Luca Marini while running between 27th and 18th position, which resulted in his retirement from the race.

Mulhauser has scored points three times in 52 Grand Prix starts, including two in the current season (15th in Spain and 13th in Germany).

=== World Supersport Championship (2017) ===
After three seasons in the Grand Prix circuit, Mulhauser moved to the World Supersport Championship with the CIA Landlord Insurance Honda team.

Mulhauser competed in the 2017 World Supersport Championship alongside Jules Cluzel, Hikari Okubo, and Hiromichi Kunikawa.

=== FIM Endurance World Championship—Moto Ain (2017–2021) ===
In 2017, Mulhauser joined the French team Moto Ain to compete in the Superstock category of the FIM Endurance World Championship. He finished second in class at the 24 Heures Motos alongside Alexis Masbou and Hugo Clère. Later that season, he also competed in the Bol d'Or with Team Bolliger Switzerland.

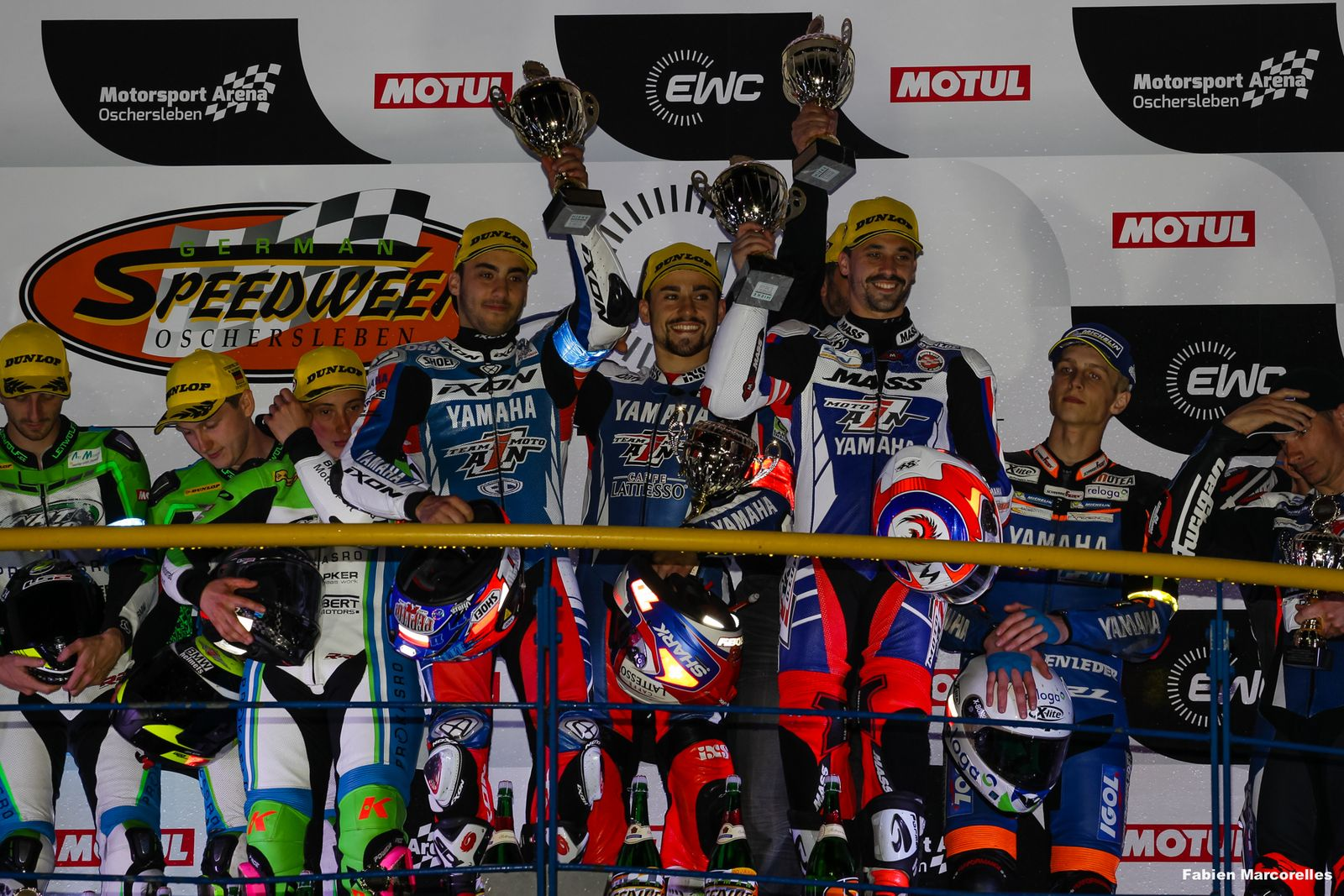
Robin Mulhauser during the Oschersleben round of the 2017 Endurance World Championship, where Moto Ain took the lead in the Superstock championship standings.

Mulhauser competed with the Moto Ain CRT team in the Superstock category of the FIM Endurance World Championship. At the 8 Hours of Oschersleben, he and teammates Roberto Rolfo and Stefan Hill finished fourth overall and first in the Superstock class. Moto Ain won the FIM Endurance World Cup on a tiebreaker against GERT56 by GS Yuasa based on the best individual race result.

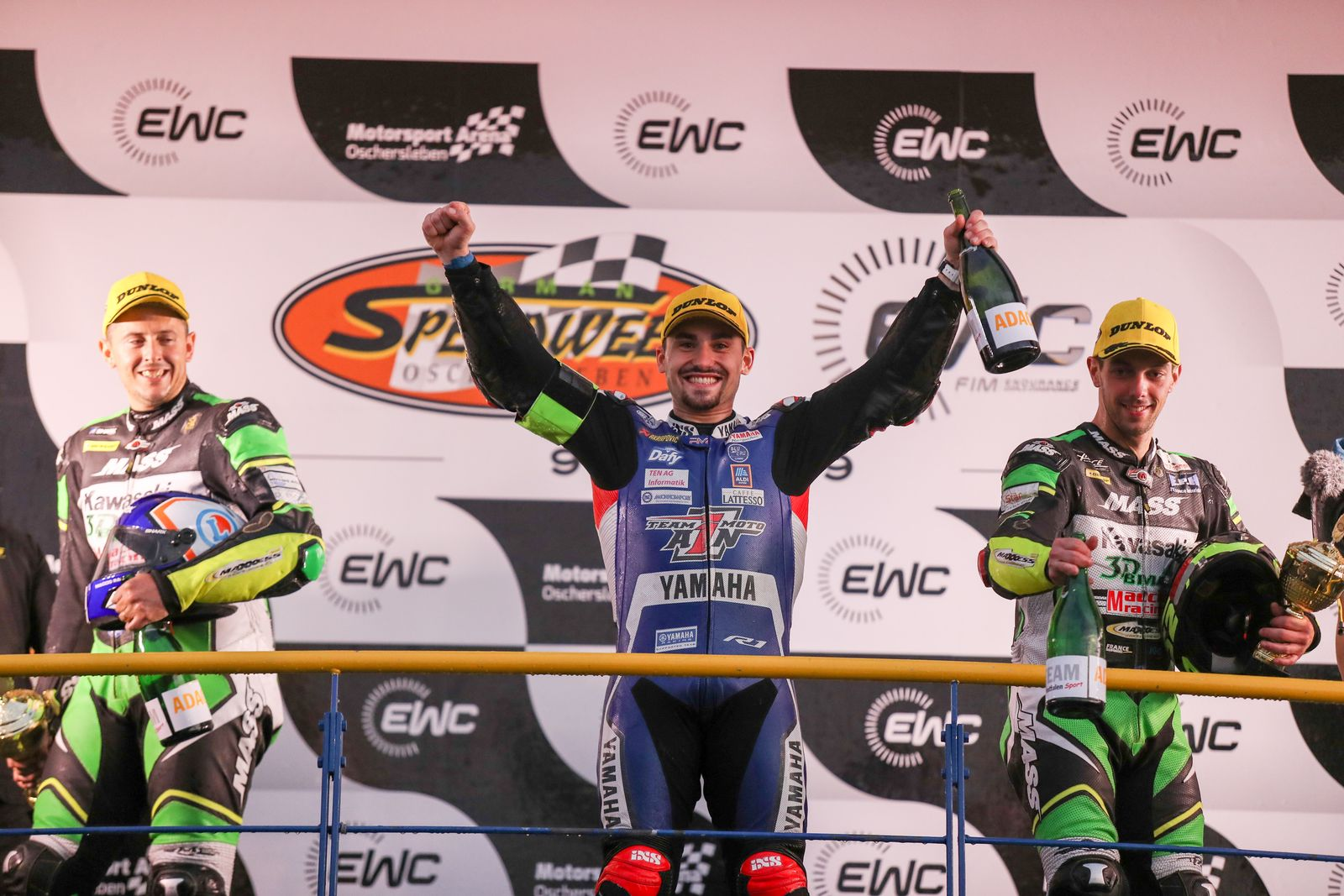
Robin Mulhauser celebrating victory in the Superstock class at the Oschersleben round of the 2019 Endurance World Championship with Moto Ain, securing the world title.

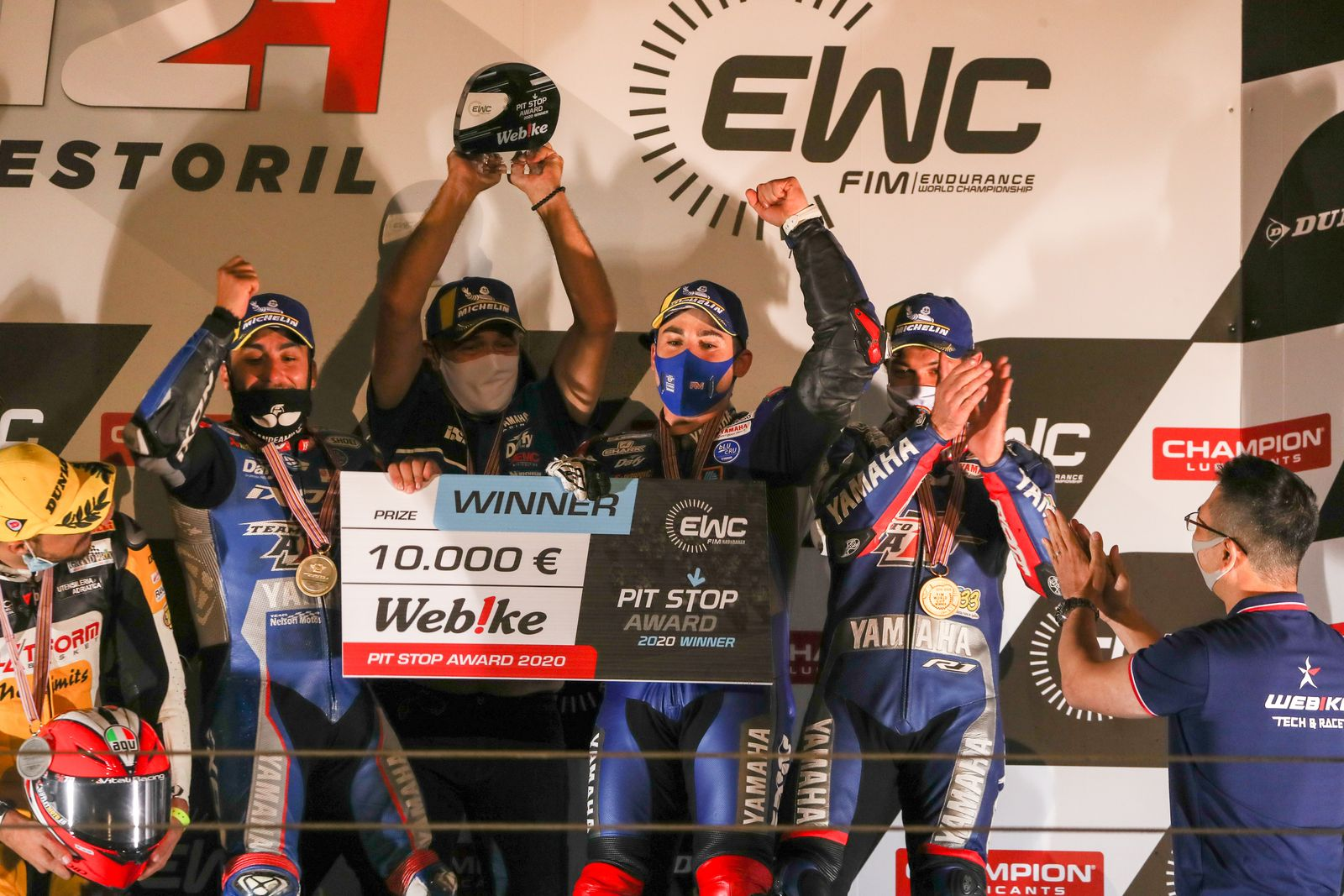
Robin Mulhauser celebrating victory in the Superstock class at Estoril during the 2020 Endurance World Championship, securing a second world title with teammates Roberto Rolfo and Hugo Clere.

During the 2019–20 FIM Endurance World Cup Superstock season, Mulhauser competed with Moto Ain alongside Roberto Rolfo and Hugo Clère. The team secured the Superstock World Cup title at the 12 Hours of Estoril in Portugal, the final race of the season. Moto Ain entered the event with a 26-point lead over GERT56 by GS Yuasa.

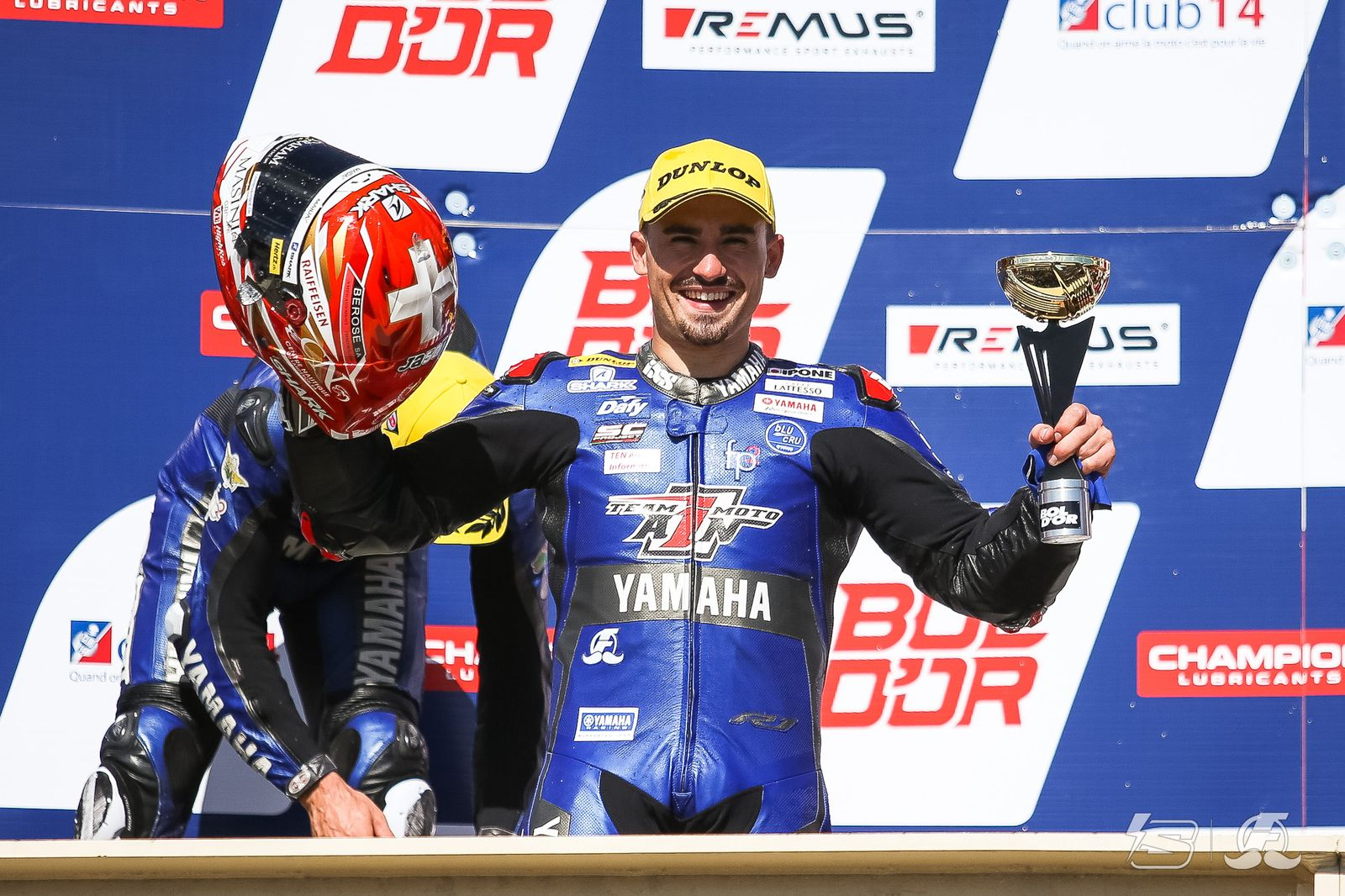
Robin Mulhauser celebrating a second-place finish in the EWC class with Moto Ain during the 2021 Endurance World Championship, alongside teammates Roberto Rolfo and Randy de Puniet.

Moto Ain moved from the Superstock category to the top class of the FIM Endurance World Championship. The team included Randy de Puniet as one of Mulhauser's teammates. At the 2021 12 Hours of Estoril, Mulhauser and the team finished fifth overall.

At the 2021 Bol d'Or, the team finished second in the Endurance World Championship category. Mulhauser left Moto Ain after the 2021 season.

=== Official reserve rider—Yamalube YART Yamaha (2022–2025) ===
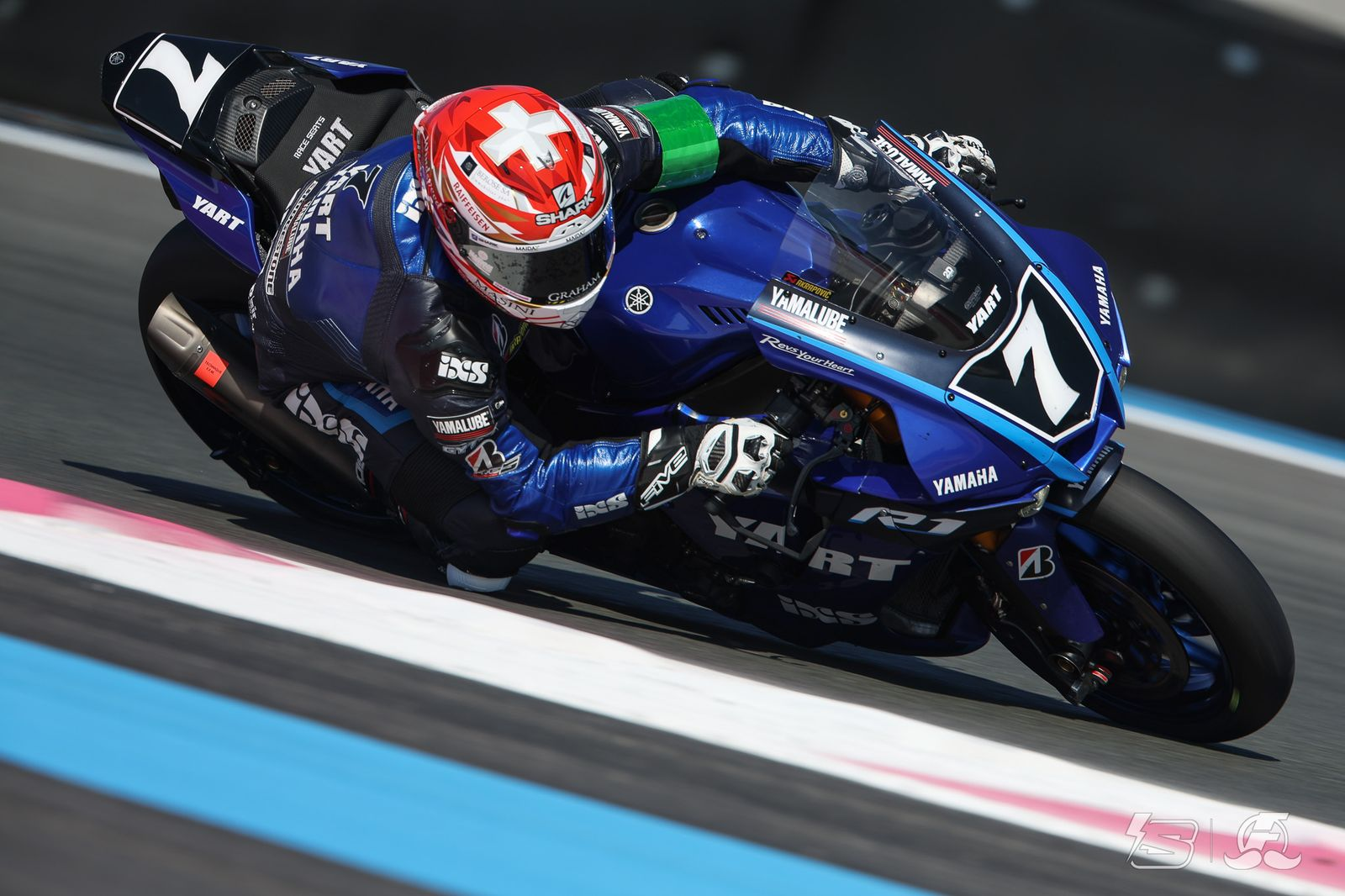
Robin Mulhauser during his debut season with the Yamaha Austria Racing Team (YART) in the Endurance World Championship, 2022.

In February 2022, Mulhauser joined the YART as a fourth rider in the FIM Endurance World Championship alongside Niccolò Canepa, Karel Hanika, and Marvin Fritz. During pre‑season testing for the 2022 Endurance World Championship at the 24 Hours of Le Mans, the YART Yamaha team recorded the fastest times in all four sessions and completed 264 laps over two days at the 4.185‑kilometer Circuit Bugatti.

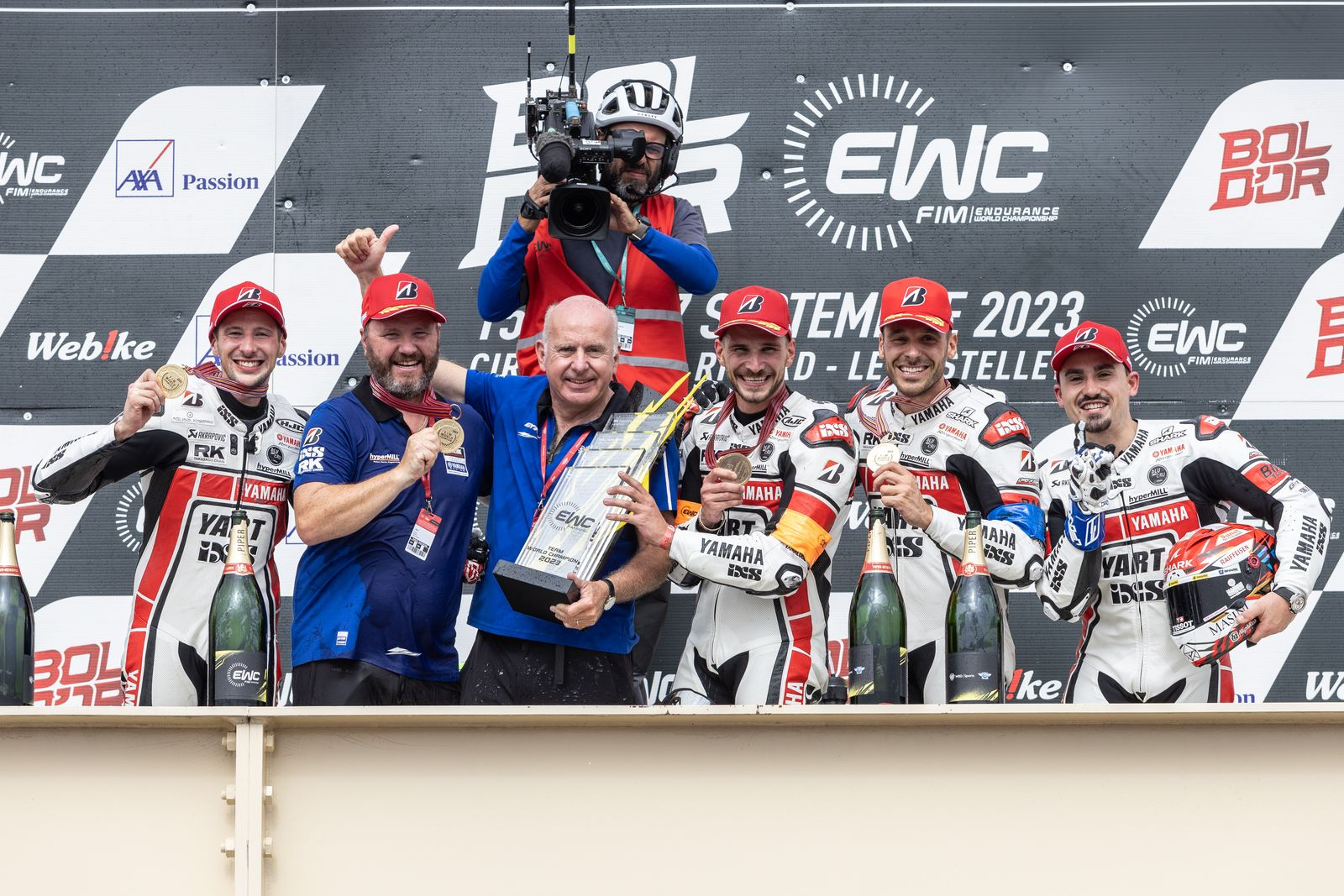
Robin Mulhauser celebrating the 2023 Endurance World Championship title with the Yamaha Austria Racing Team (YART) after the Bol d'Or, alongside teammates Marvin Fritz, Karel Hanika, and Niccolò Canepa.

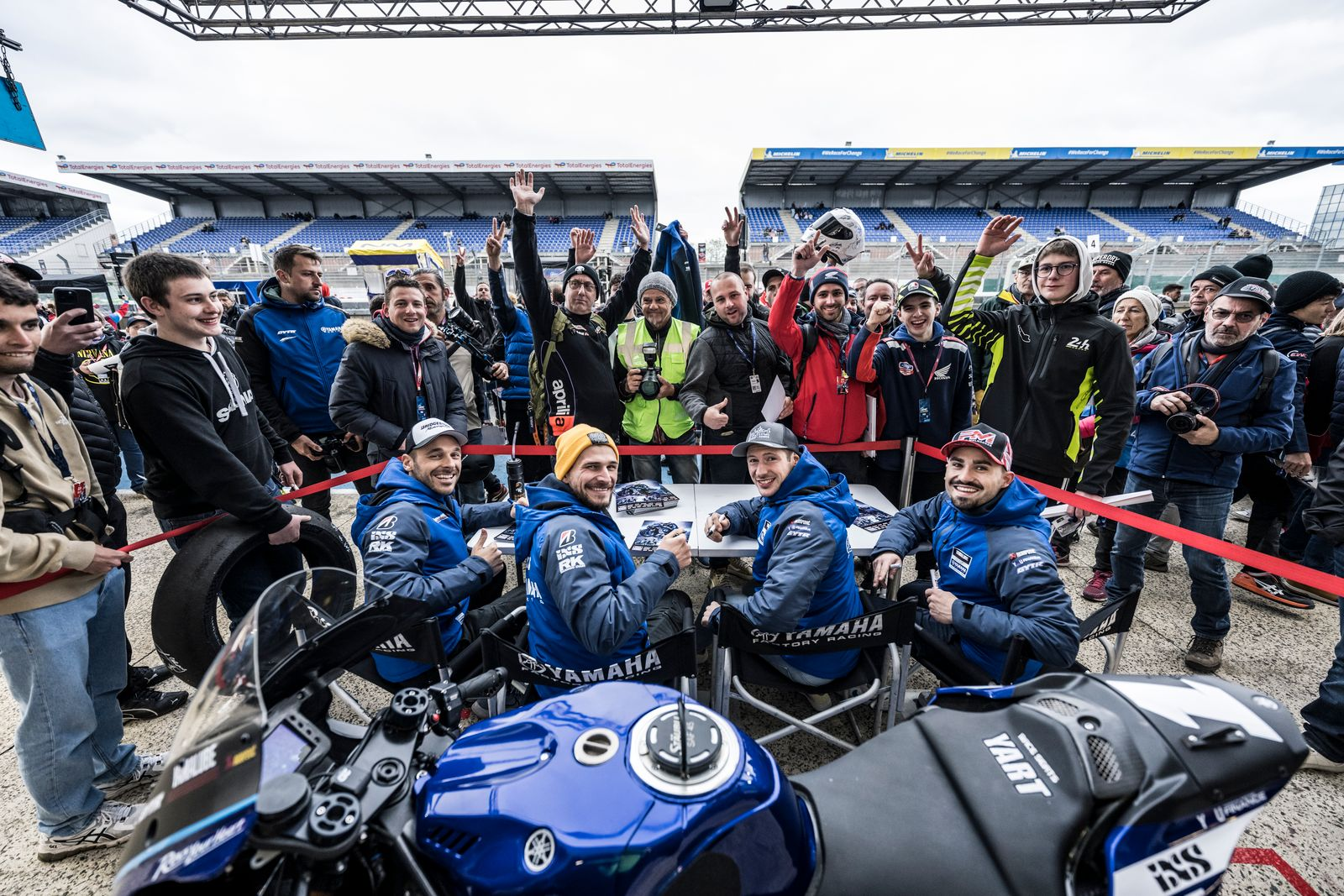
Robin Mulhauser during a signing session at the 2024 Le Mans round of the Endurance World Championship, alongside teammates Marvin Fritz, Karel Hanika, and Niccolò Canepa.

In the 2023 FIM Endurance World Championship, the Yamalube YART Yamaha team won the title after finishing fourth at the Bol d'Or, securing its first championship since 2009. Earlier in the season, the team finished second at the 24 Heures Motos in Le Mans and won the 24 Hours of Spa‑Francorchamps. YART entered the Bol d'Or 13 points behind championship leader F.C.C. TSR Honda France. Honda later retired from the race because of a mechanical issue, and YART's fourth-place finish secured the championship.

In the 2025 FIM Endurance World Championship, the Yamalube YART Yamaha team won the title after finishing second at the Bol d'Or, securing the championship by a single point. The team completed 725 laps in the race, giving it a narrow margin over its closest rival. Going into the final round in France, YART held a small lead over the BMW Motorrad World Endurance Team. The 2025 title was the team's third FIM Endurance World Championship victory, after 2009 and 2023.

Mulhauser was also entered in the 2025 Suzuka 8 Hours with Team BabyFace Titanium Power, alongside Japanese riders Kazuma Tsuda and Keisuke Maeda.

=== Season 2026—3ART Best of Bike (Superstock) ===
In 2026, Mulhauser competed in the Superstock category at the 24 Hours of Le Mans for 3ART Best of Bike Hamaguchi on Yamaha #36, alongside Loïc Arbel, Jan Mohr, and Luca De Vleeschauwer.

== Career statistics ==
=== European Superstock 600 Championship ===
2011 - 26th, European Superstock 600 Championship, Yamaha YZF-R6

2012 - 20th, European Superstock 600 Championship, Yamaha YZF-R6

2013 - 7th, European Superstock 600 Championship #71, Yamaha YZF-R6

=== Endurance World Championship FIM EWC ===
Year	Category	Team	Bike	1	2	3	4	5	POS	Pts
2016-17	Superstock	Moto-Ain	Yamaha	(France) Bol d'Or DNS	(France) 24 Heures Moto 2nd	(Germany) Oschersleben 8 Hours 1st	8 Hours of Slovakia Ring DNS	(Japan) Suzuka 8 Hours DNS	2nd	65
2017-18	EWC	Bolliger	Kawasaki	(France) Bol d'Or 17th	(France) 24 Heures Moto 4th	8 Hours of Slovakia Ring 8th	(Germany) Oschersleben 8 Hours 20th	(Japan) Suzuka 8 Hours 30th	9th	53
2018-19	Superstock	Moto-Ain	Yamaha	(France) Bol d'Or DNF	(France) 24 Heures Moto 2nd	8 Hours of Slovakia Ring 6th	(Germany) Oschersleben 8 Hours 1st		1st	45
2019-20	Superstock	Moto-Ain	Yamaha	(France) Bol d'Or 1st	(Malaysia) 8 Hours of Sepang 1st	(France) 24 Heures Moto 3rd	(Portugal) 12 Hours of Estoril 1st		1st	215.5
2021	EWC	Moto-Ain	Yamaha	(France) 24 Heures Moto DNF	(Portugal) 12 Hours of Estoril 5th	(France) Bol d'Or 2nd	(Czech Republic) 6 Hours of Most DNS		6th	72
2022	EWC	YART	Yamaha	(France) 24 Heures Moto 2nd	(Belgium) 24H Spa EWC Motos DNF	(Japan) Suzuka 8 Hours 7th	(France) Bol d'Or DNF		6th	97
2023	EWC	YART	Yamaha	(France) 24 Heures Moto 2nd	(Belgium) 24H Spa EWC Motos 1st	(Japan) Suzuka 8 Hours 22nd	(France) Bol d'Or 4th		1st	181
2024	EWC	YART	Yamaha	(France) 24 Heures Moto 3rd	(Belgium) 24H Spa EWC Motos 1st	(Japan) Suzuka 8 Hours 2nd	(France) Bol d'Or 3rd		2nd	159

=== European Superstock 600 ===
==== Races by year ====
(key) (Races in bold indicate pole position, races in italics indicate fastest lap)

Year	Bike	1	2	3	4	5	6	7	8	9	10	Pos	Pts
2011	Yamaha	ASS	MNZ	MIS	ARA	BRN	SIL	NÜR	IMO 17	MAG 5	POR DNS	26th	11
2012	Yamaha	IMO 11	ASS 15	MNZ 26	MIS 17	ARA Ret	BRN 17	SIL 11	NÜR Ret	POR 10	MAG Ret	20th	17
2013	Yamaha	ARA 4	ASS 9	MNZ 12	POR 8	IMO 18	SIL1 5	SIL2 3	NÜR 10	MAG 14	JER Ret	7th	67

=== Supersport World Championship ===
==== Races by year ====
Year	Bike	1	2	3	4	5	6	7	8	9	10	11	12	13	Pos.	Pts
2012	Yamaha	AUS	ITA	NED	ITA	EUR	SMR	SPA	CZE	GBR	RUS 26	GER	POR	FRA	NC	0
2017	Honda	AUS Ret	THA 10	SPA Ret	NED 20	ITA 18	GBR 18	ITA Ret	GER	POR	FRA	SPA	QAT		34th	6

=== Grand Prix motorcycle racing ===
==== By season ====
Season	Class	Motorcycle	Team	Race	Win	Podium	Pole	FLap	Pts	Plcd
2013	Moto2	Suter	Technomag carXpert	1	0	0	0	0	0	NC
2014	Moto2	Suter	Technomag carXpert	16	0	0	0	0	0	NC
2015	Moto2	Kalex	Technomag Racing Interwetten	18	0	0	0	0	1	28th
2016	Moto2	Kalex	CarXpert Interwetten	18	0	0	0	0	4	30th
Total				**53**	**0**	**0**	**0**	**0**	**5**	

==== Races by year ====
Year	Class	Bike	1	2	3	4	5	6	7	8	9	10	11	12	13	14	15	16	17	18	Pos.	Points
2013	Moto2	Suter	QAT	AME	SPA	FRA	ITA	CAT	NED	GER	INP	CZE	GBR	RSM	ARA 23	MAL	AUS	JPN	VAL		NC	0
2014	Moto2	Suter	QAT 22	AME 24	ARG 29	SPA 27	FRA 25	ITA 30	CAT 18	NED 27	GER 24	INP 22	CZE 30	GBR 27	RSM 29	ARA 26	JPN 28	AUS DNS	MAL DNS	VAL 17	NC	0
2015	Moto2	Kalex	QAT 20	AME 20	ARG 23	SPA 23	FRA 20	ITA 22	CAT Ret	NED 20	GER 20	INP 15	CZE Ret	GBR 23	RSM Ret	ARA 19	JPN 23	AUS Ret	MAL 19	VAL 22	28th	1
2016	Moto2	Kalex	QAT 20	ARG 22	AME Ret	SPA 15	FRA 18	ITA 21	CAT 21	NED 22	GER 13	AUT 25	CZE 22	GBR 24	RSM 20	ARA 27	JPN Ret	AUS 17	MAL Ret	VAL 21	30th	4

=== Suzuka 8 Hours results ===
Year	Class	Team	Co-riders	Bike	Pos
2025	**EWC**	(Japan) Team BabyFace Titanium Power	(Japan) Keisuke Maeda (Japan) Kazuma Tsuda	Yamaha YZF-R1	15th
2026	**SST**	(Japan) 3ART Best Of Bike Hamaguchi	(France) Lucas Mahias (France) Loïc Arbel	Yamaha YZF-R1	TBD

=== Racing career summary ===
Years	Championship	Starts	Points	Best result
2013-2016	Moto2 World Championship	52 (inc. 1 wild card)	5	13th (Germany 2016)
2017	World Supersport	77		18th (Donington)
2017-2020	EWC Superstock	Multiple	2x World Cup champion	1st overall SST class
2021-2025	EWC Formula (premier class)	Multiple	2x World Champion (reserve)	2nd (Bol d'Or 2021)

== Career honours ==
Season	Title	Category	Team	Note
2018-2019	FIM Endurance World Cup—Superstock	Endurance SST	Moto Ain/Yamaha #96	(Germany) 8 Hours of Oschersleben
2019-2020	FIM Endurance World Cup—Superstock	Endurance SST	Moto Ain/Yamaha #96	(Portugal) 12 Hours of Estoril
2023	FIM Endurance World Championship—EWC	Endurance EWC	Yart Yamaha #7 (reserve)	(France) Bol d'Or
2025	FIM Endurance World Championship—EWC	Endurance EWC	Yart Yamaha #7 (reserve)	(France) Bol d'Or

Other notable results:

- 2nd at the Bol d'Or 2021 (EWC class) with Moto Ain
- 7th in European Superstock 600 championship (2013)
- First World Championship point in Moto2 at the Indianapolis GP (2015)
- Fastest reserve rider in qualifying at the Bol d'Or 2022 (YART)
