= Scott Deroue =

Dutch motorcycle racer

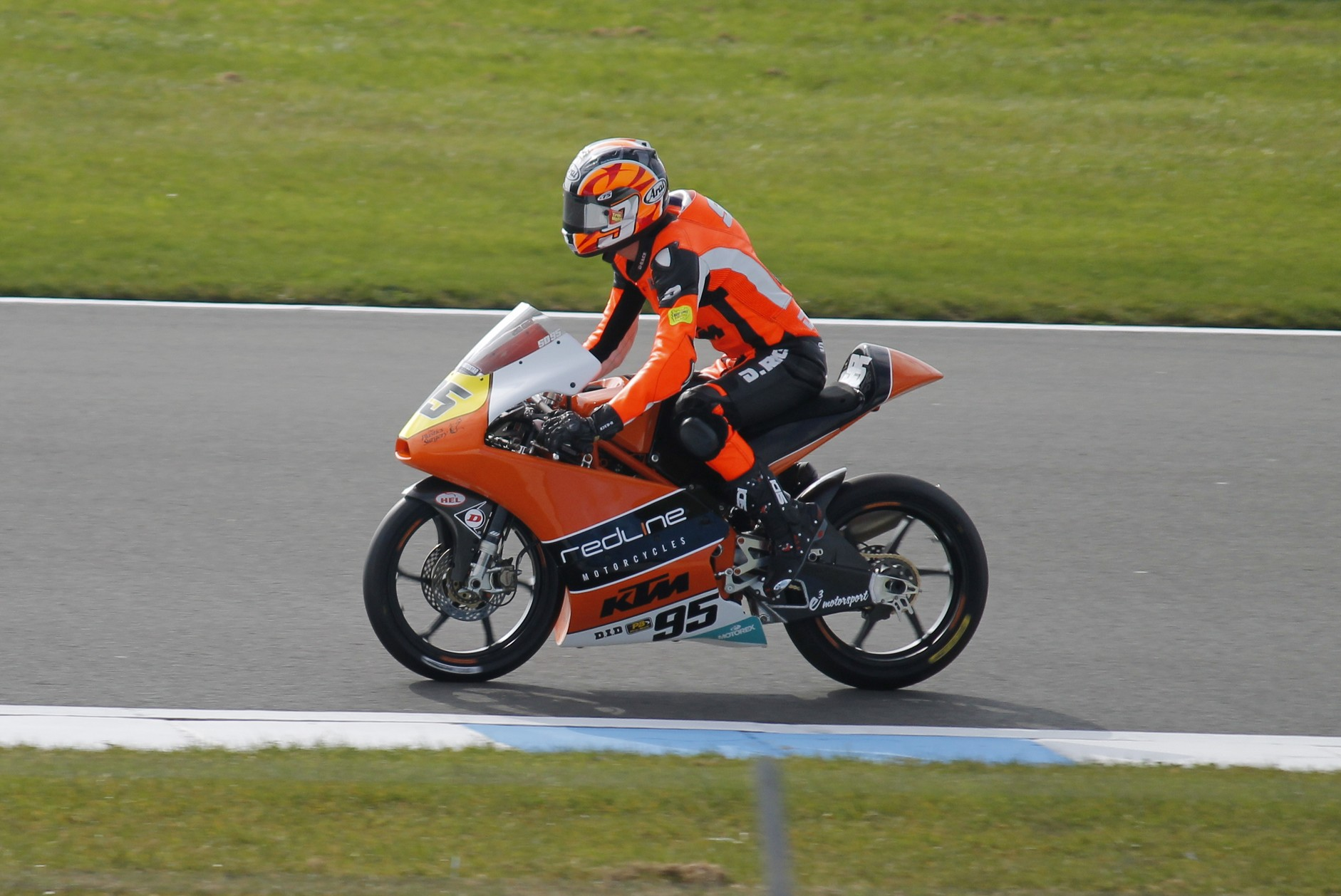
- Deroue in 2015
- Nationality: Dutch
- Born: 23 December 1995 (age 30); Nijkerkerveen, Netherlands
- Current team: Motoport Kawasaki
- Bike number: 95
Motorcycle racing career statistics
Moto3 World Championship
Active years	2014
Manufacturers	Kalex KTM
Championships	0
2014 championship position	NC (0 pts)
Starts / Wins / Podiums / Poles / F. laps / Points; 18 / 0 / 0 / 0 / 0 / 0
Supersport 300 World Championship
Active years	2017-2020
Manufacturers	Kawasaki
Championships	0
2020 championship position	2nd (187 pts)
Starts / Wins / Podiums / Poles / F. laps / Points; 39 / 6 / 20 / 3 / 2 / 509

Scott Deroue (born 23 December 1995 in Nijkerkerveen) is a Dutch motorcycle racer. In 2017, he competed in the Supersport 300 World Championship aboard a Kawasaki Ninja 300. He was a Red Bull MotoGP Rookies Cup contestant in 2011, 2012 and 2013 and the British Motostar champion in 2015. He has also competed in the British National Superstock 600 Championship.

== Career statistics ==
=== Red Bull MotoGP Rookies Cup ===
==== Races by year ====
(key) (Races in bold indicate pole position, races in italics indicate fastest lap)

Year	1	2	3	4	5	6	7	8	9	10	11	12	13	14	15	Pos	Pts
2011	SPA1; 23	SPA2; 11	POR1; 17	POR2; Ret	GBR1; 19	GBR2; 15	NED1; 9	NED2; 7	ITA; 14	GER1; 3	GER2; 16	CZE1; 16	CZE2; 3	RSM; 20		15th	56
2012	SPA1; 10	SPA2; Ret	POR1; 1	POR2; 1	GBR1; 5	GBR2; 2	NED1; 5	NED2; 7	GER1; 1	GER2; 3	CZE1; 9	CZE2; Ret	RSM; 4	ARA1; Ret	ARA2; 7	2nd	177
2013	AME1; 6	AME2; 7	JER1; 9	JER2; 7	ASS1; Ret	ASS2; 4	SAC1; 3	SAC2; Ret	BRN; 6	SIL1; Ret	SIL2; 1	MIS; 8	ARA1; 2	ARA2; Ret		7th	127

=== FIM CEV Moto3 Championship ===
==== Races by year ====
(key) (Races in bold indicate pole position; races in italics indicate fastest lap)

Year	Bike	1	2	3	4	5	6	7	8	9	Pos	Pts
2013	Kalex KTM	CAT1	CAT2	ARA	ALB1	ALB2	NAV; 11	VAL1; Ret	VAL1; 13	JER	28th	9

=== Grand Prix motorcycle racing ===
==== By season ====
Season	Class	Motorcycle	Team	Race	Win	Podium	Pole	FLap	Pts	Plcd
2014	Moto3	Kalex KTM	RW Racing GP	18	0	0	0	0	0	NC
Total				**18**	**0**	**0**	**0**	**0**	**0**	

==== Races by year ====
(key) (Races in bold indicate pole position; races in italics indicate fastest lap)

Year	Class	Bike	1	2	3	4	5	6	7	8	9	10	11	12	13	14	15	16	17	18	Pos	Pts
2014	Moto3	Kalex KTM	QAT; 19	AME; 19	ARG; 17	SPA; Ret	FRA; 25	ITA; Ret	CAT; 26	NED; 20	GER; Ret	INP; 23	CZE; 19	GBR; Ret	RSM; Ret	ARA; Ret	JPN; Ret	AUS; 23	MAL; Ret	VAL; Ret	NC	0

=== Supersport 300 World Championship ===
==== Races by year ====
(key) (Races in bold indicate pole position; races in italics indicate fastest lap)

Year	Bike	1	2	3	4	5	6	7	8	9	10	Pos	Pts
2017	Kawasaki	**SPA**; 1	NED; 1	IMO; 11	GBR; 3	MIS; 12	LAU; DSQ	POR; 7	FRA; 9	SPA; 2		3rd	111
2018	Kawasaki	SPA; 2	NED; 3	ITA; Ret	GBR; 6	CZE; 7	ITA; Ret	POR; 1	**FRA**; Ret			3rd	80
2019	Kawasaki	SPA; 3	NED; 3	ITA; C	SPA; 2	SPA; 23	ITA; 7	GBR; DNQ	POR; 1	**FRA**; 3	QAT; 1	2nd	131

Year	Bike	1	2	3	4	5	6	7	8	9	10	11	12	13	14	Pos	Pts
2020	Kawasaki	SPA; 3	SPA; 4	POR; 4	POR; 1	SPA; Ret	SPA; 2	SPA; 3	SPA; 2	SPA; 13	SPA; 2	FRA; 2	FRA; 4	POR; 8	POR; 16	2nd	187
