= Lorenzo Petrarca =

Italian motorcycle racer

- Nationality: Italian
- Born: 24 July 1997 (age 29); Sant'Omero, Italy
- Current team: Green Speed
- Bike number: 7
Motorcycle racing career statistics
Moto3 World Championship
Active years	2014, 2016
Manufacturers	KTM, Mahindra
Championships	0
2016 championship position	36th (2 pts)
Starts / Wins / Podiums / Poles / F. laps / Points; 19 / 0 / 0 / 0 / 0 / 2

Lorenzo Petrarca (born 24 July 1997 in Sant'Omero) is an Italian motorcycle racer. He competes in the CIV Supersport 600 Championship aboard a Kawasaki ZX-6R.

== Career statistics ==
=== FIM CEV Moto3 Junior World Championship ===
==== Races by year ====
(key) (Races in bold indicate pole position, races in italics indicate fastest lap)

Year	Bike	1	2	3	4	5	6	7	8	9	10	11	12	Pos	Pts
2014	FTR Honda	JER1	JER2	LMS	ARA	CAT1; 34	CAT2; 32	ALB; 23	NAV	ALG	VAL1	VAL2		NC	0
2015	KTM	ALG; 14	LMS; 10	CAT1; 7	CAT2; 10	ARA1; 14	ARA2; Ret	ALB; 12	NAV; 14	JER1; 7	JER2; 7	VAL1; Ret	VAL2; 14	11th	51
2017	Husqvarna	ALB; 14	LMS; 15	CAT1; 13	CAT2; 11	VAL1; 10	VAL2; 10	EST; Ret	JER1; 11	JER1; Ret	ARA; 21	VAL1; 15	VAL2; 15	16th	30

=== Grand Prix motorcycle racing ===
==== By season ====
Season	Class	Motorcycle	Team	Race	Win	Podium	Pole	FLap	Pts	Plcd
2014	Moto3	KTM	Team Ciatti	1	0	0	0	0	0	NC
2016	Moto3	Mahindra	3570 Team Italia	18	0	0	0	0	2	36th
Total				**19**	**0**	**0**	**0**	**0**	**2**	

==== Races by year ====
Year	Class	Bike	1	2	3	4	5	6	7	8	9	10	11	12	13	14	15	16	17	18	Pos.	Pts
2014	Moto3	KTM	QAT	AME	ARG	SPA	FRA	ITA	CAT	NED	GER	INP	CZE	GBR	RSM; 25	ARA	JPN	AUS	MAL	VAL	NC	0
2016	Moto3	Mahindra	QAT; 31	ARG; 31	AME; 24	SPA; Ret	FRA; 24	ITA; 25	CAT; 22	NED; 20	GER; Ret	AUT; 30	CZE; 24	GBR; 28	RSM; 24	ARA; 29	JPN; 21	AUS; 17	MAL; 14	VAL; 28	36th	2
