= Stefano Valtulini =

Italian motorcycle racer

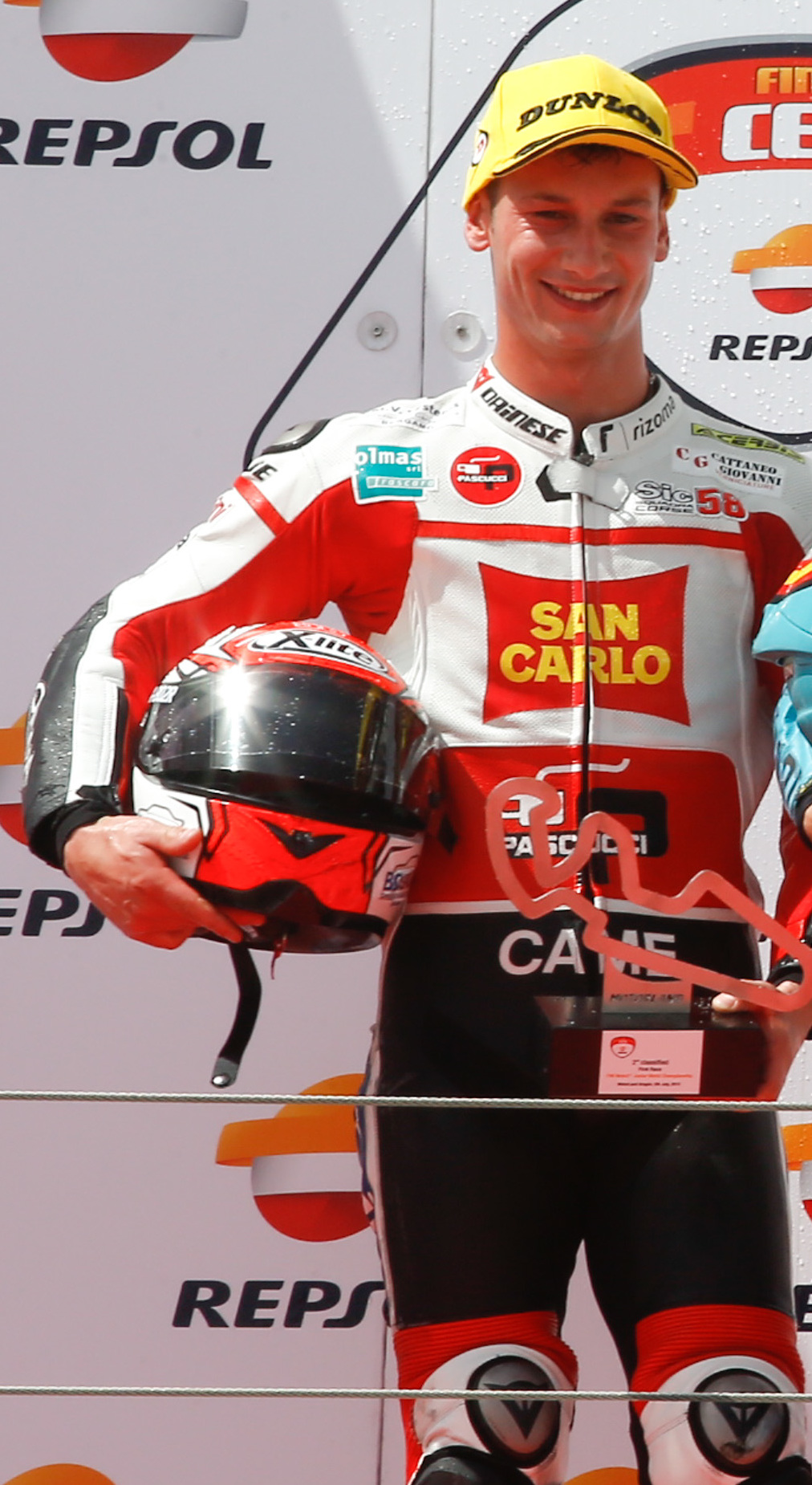
- Valtulini in 2015
- Nationality: Italian
- Born: 5 July 1996 (age 30); Calcinate, Italy
- Current team: Black Flag Motorsport
- Bike number: 43
Motorcycle racing career statistics
Moto3 World Championship
Active years	2012, 2016
Manufacturers	Honda, Mahindra
Championships	0
2016 championship position	34th (3 pts)
Starts / Wins / Podiums / Poles / F. laps / Points; 18 / 0 / 0 / 0 / 0 / 3
MotoE World Championship
Active years	2021
Manufacturers	Energica
Championships	0
2021 championship position	19th (1 pt)
Starts / Wins / Podiums / Poles / F. laps / Points; 1 / 0 / 0 / 0 / 0 / 1
Supersport World Championship
Active years	2018, 2020, 2023
Manufacturers	Kawasaki
Championships	0
2023 championship position	44th (1 pts)
Starts / Wins / Podiums / Poles / F. laps / Points; 5 / 0 / 0 / 0 / 0 / 2

Stefano Valtulini (born 5 July 1996) is an Italian motorcycle racer. He currently competes in the CIV Supersport Championship aboard a Kawasaki ZX-6R.

== Career ==
Born in Calcinate, Valtulini was a competitor of the Red Bull MotoGP Rookies Cup in 2011.

After a wild card appearance in 2012, Valtulini made his full-time Grand Prix debut in the Moto3 World Championship in 2016 with 3570 Team Italia on a Mahindra; his best result and only point scoring finish was a 13th place at Sepang.

In 2025, Valtulini competed in CIV Superbike Championship.

== Career statistics ==
=== Career highlights ===
- 2010: 1st, Italian MiniGP 70 Championship
- 2010: 1st, MiniGP 70 National Trophy
- 2021: Yamaha - Rosso Corsa (CIV Supersport 600) #43

=== Red Bull MotoGP Rookies Cup ===
==== Races by year ====
(key) (Races in bold indicate pole position, races in italics indicate fastest lap)

Year	1	2	3	4	5	6	7	8	9	10	11	12	13	14	Pos	Pts
2011	SPA1; 15	SPA2; Ret	POR1; 16	POR2; 14	GBR1; 7	GBR2; 6	NED1; 12	NED2; 8	**ITA**; 12	GER1; 15	GER2; 8	CZE1; 4	CZE2; 5	RSM; 9	11th	78

=== FIM CEV Moto3 Junior World Championship ===
==== Races by year ====
(key) (Races in bold indicate pole position, races in italics indicate fastest lap)

Year	Bike	1	2	3	4	5	6	7	8	9	10	11	12	Pos	Pts
2015	KTM	ALG; 7	LMS; 8	CAT1; Ret	CAT2; 8	ARA1; 2	ARA2; Ret	ALB; 4	NAV; 10	JER1; 14	JER2; 14	VAL1; 9	VAL2; 10	8th	81

=== Grand Prix motorcycle racing ===
==== By season ====
Season	Class	Motorcycle	Team	Race	Win	Podium	Pole	FLap	Pts	Plcd
2012	Moto3	Honda	Team Imperiali Racing	1	0	0	0	0	0	NC
2016	Moto3	Mahindra	3570 Team Italia	17	0	0	0	0	3	34th
2021	MotoE	Energica Ego Corsa	Ongetta SIC58 Squadracorse	1	0	0	0	0	1	19th
Total				**19**	**0**	**0**	**0**	**0**	**4**	

==== By class ====
Class	Seasons	1st GP	1st Pod	1st Win	Race	Win	Podiums	Pole	FLap	Pts
Moto3	2012, 2016	2012 San Marino			18	0	0	0	0	3
MotoE	2021	2021 Austria			1	0	0	0	0	1
Total	2012, 2016, 2021				**19**	**0**	**0**	**0**	**0**	**4**

==== Races by year ====
(key)

Year	Class	Bike	1	2	3	4	5	6	7	8	9	10	11	12	13	14	15	16	17	18	Pos.	Pts
2012	Moto3	Honda	QAT	SPA	POR	FRA	CAT	GBR	NED	GER	ITA	IND	CZE	RSM; 24	ARA	JPN	MAL	AUS	VAL		NC	0
2016	Moto3	Mahindra	QAT; 29	ARG; 28	AME; Ret	SPA; DNS	FRA; 22	ITA; 24	CAT; Ret	NED; 18	GER; 20	AUT; 28	CZE; Ret	GBR; Ret	RSM; 26	ARA; Ret	JPN; Ret	AUS; Ret	MAL; 13	VAL; 31	34th	3
2021	MotoE	Energica	SPA	FRA	CAT	NED	AUT; 15	RSM1	RSM2												19th	1

=== Supersport World Championship ===
==== Races by year ====
Year	Bike	1	2	3	4	5	6	7	8	9	10	11	12	13	14	15	Pos.	Pts
2018	Kawasaki	AUS	THA	SPA	NED	ITA	GBR	CZE	ITA; Ret	POR	FRA	ARG	QAT				NC	0
2020	Kawasaki	AUS	SPA	SPA	POR	POR	SPA; Ret	SPA; 16	SPA	SPA	SPA	SPA	FRA	FRA	POR	POR	NC	0

Year	Bike	1	2	3	4	5	6	7	8	9	10	11	12	13	14	15	16	17	18	19	20	21	22	23	24	Pos	Pts
2023	Kawasaki	AUS	AUS	INA	INA	NED	NED	SPA	SPA	ITA	ITA	GBR	GBR	IMO; 15	IMO; Ret	CZE	CZE	FRA	FRA	SPA	SPA	POR	POR	JER	JER	44th	1
