= 2011 Red Bull MotoGP Rookies Cup =

Motorcycle racing competition

2011 Red Bull MotoGP Rookies Cup season

Seasons
- ← 2010 2012 →

The 2011 Red Bull MotoGP Rookies Cup season was the fifth season of the Red Bull MotoGP Rookies Cup. The season began at Circuito de Jerez on 2 April and ended on 3 September at the Misano World Circuit after 14 races. The races, contested by the riders on equal KTM machinery, were held at eight meetings on the Grand Prix motorcycle racing calendar.

== Calendar ==
The season saw an expanded calendar, from six meetings up to eight meetings, adding events at Estoril for the first time since 2008, and Silverstone for the first time. Of the eight meetings, six were double-headers, with single races at Mugello and Misano.

2011 calendar
Round	Date	Circuit	Pole position	Fastest lap	Race winner
1	2 April	(Spain) Jerez	(South Africa) Brad Binder	(Germany) Philipp Öttl	(Germany) Philipp Öttl
1	3 April	(Spain) Jerez	(South Africa) Brad Binder	(Germany) Philipp Öttl	(Australia) Arthur Sissis
2	30 April	(Portugal) Estoril	(South Africa) Brad Binder	(South Africa) Brad Binder	(South Africa) Brad Binder
2	1 May	(Portugal) Estoril	(South Africa) Brad Binder	(Spain) Aaron España	(Australia) Arthur Sissis
3	11 June	(United Kingdom) Silverstone	(France) Alan Techer	(Italy) Lorenzo Baldassarri	(Austria) Lukas Trautmann
3	12 June	(United Kingdom) Silverstone	(France) Alan Techer	(Italy) Lorenzo Baldassarri	(Italy) Lorenzo Baldassarri
4	24 June	(Netherlands) Assen	(United Kingdom) James Flitcroft	(Italy) Lorenzo Baldassarri	(Italy) Lorenzo Baldassarri
4	25 June	(Netherlands) Assen	(United Kingdom) James Flitcroft	(Germany) Florian Alt	(Australia) Arthur Sissis
5	2 July	(Italy) Mugello	(Italy) Stefano Valtulini	(Germany) Philipp Öttl	(Australia) Arthur Sissis
6	16 July	(Germany) Sachsenring	(Germany) Philipp Öttl	(Germany) Philipp Öttl	(Germany) Philipp Öttl
6	17 July	(Germany) Sachsenring	(Germany) Philipp Öttl	(Germany) Florian Alt	(France) Alan Techer
7	13 August	(Czech Republic) Brno	(Germany) Florian Alt	(Netherlands) Scott Deroue	(United States) Joe Roberts
7	14 August	(Czech Republic) Brno	(Germany) Florian Alt	(United States) Joe Roberts	(France) Alan Techer
8	3 September	(San Marino) Misano	(Germany) Florian Alt	(Germany) Florian Alt	(Germany) Florian Alt

== Entry list ==
2011 entry list
No.	Rider	Rounds
5	(Germany) Philipp Öttl	1, 3–8
7	(Italy) Lorenzo Baldassarri	All
8	(Malaysia) Hafiq Azmi	All
16	(Italy) Andrea Migno	All
18	(United Kingdom) James Flitcroft	All
19	(Italy) Kevin Arginò	All
22	(Spain) Aaron España	All
25	(Germany) Willi Albert	All
26	(Austria) Deni Cudic	1–5
27	(United States) Joe Roberts	All
32	(Germany) Max Enderlein	All
34	(Spain) Xavier Pinsach	1–7
41	(South Africa) Brad Binder	All
43	(Italy) Stefano Valtulini	All
47	(Czech Republic) Tomáš Vavrouš	All
50	(Austria) Lukas Trautmann	All
61	(Australia) Arthur Sissis	All
66	(Germany) Florian Alt	1, 3–8
67	(Finland) Joakim Niemi	All
69	(United Kingdom) Javier Orellana	All
75	(Portugal) Ivo Lopes	All
77	(United Kingdom) Kyle Ryde	All
89	(France) Alan Techer	All
95	(Netherlands) Scott Deroue	All
96	(Spain) Josep García	1–3, 7–8

== Championship standings ==
Points were awarded to the top fifteen finishers, provided the rider finished the race.

Position	1st	2nd	3rd	4th	5th	6th	7th	8th	9th	10th	11th	12th	13th	14th	15th
Points	25	20	16	13	11	10	9	8	7	6	5	4	3	2	1

Pos.	Rider	JER (Spain)		EST (Portugal)		SIL (United Kingdom)		ASS (Netherlands)		MUG (Italy)	SAC (Germany)		BRN (Czech Republic)		MIS (San Marino)	Pts
1	(Italy) Lorenzo Baldassarri	4	12	3	2	4	1	1	2	4	6	4	6	6	3	208
2	(Australia) Arthur Sissis	6	1	2	1	9	7	2	1	1	18	Ret	2	Ret	4	199
3	(France) Alan Techer	3	Ret	4	4	**6**	**3**	Ret	4	8	4	1	Ret	1	6	162
4	(Germany) Philipp Öttl	1	2			17	Ret	7	9	5	**1**	**6**	9	9	2	141
5	(Czech Republic) Tomáš Vavrouš	Ret	Ret	Ret	11	12	10	16	6	2	5	5	3	2	5	114
6	(Germany) Florian Alt	5	Ret			8	Ret	17	3	6	14	2	**11**	**8**	**1**	105
7	(South Africa) Brad Binder	**2**	**Ret**	**1**	**17**	15	Ret	10	20	10	2	9	12	10	Ret	95
8	(Portugal) Ivo Lopes	20	8	6	Ret	2	4	4	16	22	10	12	14	7	8	93
9	(Spain) Xavier Pinsach	7	Ret	7	3	14	5	Ret	5	7	Ret	7	5	Ret		87
10	(Austria) Lukas Trautmann	10	Ret	10	6	1	2	5	18	21	16	Ret	19	Ret	12	82
11	(Italy) Stefano Valtulini	15	Ret	16	14	7	6	12	8	**12**	15	8	4	5	9	78
12	(United States) Joe Roberts	12	9	11	5	16	14	13	15	16	17	Ret	1	12	13	65
13	(Spain) Aaron España	8	3	8	8	Ret	Ret	18	11	3	Ret	18	22	16	21	61
14	(Italy) Kevin Arginò	17	4	14	10	3	Ret	6	13	20	13	Ret	10	14	16	61
15	(Netherlands) Scott Deroue	23	11	17	Ret	19	15	9	7	14	3	16	16	3	20	56
16	(Finland) Joakim Niemi	19	5	5	7	Ret	Ret	8	Ret	13	7	Ret	13	15	17	55
17	(United Kingdom) James Flitcroft	Ret	7	Ret	9	18	11	**3**	**Ret**	Ret	Ret	17	21	4	Ret	50
18	(Malaysia) Hafiq Azmi	16	Ret	Ret	15	5	8	11	Ret	17	11	11	7	19	19	44
19	(United Kingdom) Kyle Ryde	13	6	12	12	23	Ret	20	14	18	12	14	20	11	7	43
20	(Italy) Andrea Migno	11	Ret	9	Ret	21	16	19	10	15	8	10	15	13	14	39
21	(Germany) Willi Albert	21	Ret	18	Ret	11	17	14	12	11	20	3	17	18	15	33
22	(Germany) Max Enderlein	14	10	15	16	20	9	Ret	19	19	9	13	18	17	11	31
23	(United Kingdom) Javier Orellana	9	Ret	DNS	DNS	13	13	15	Ret	9	19	15	8	Ret	18	30
24	(Spain) Josep García	22	13	13	13	10	Ret						Ret	20	10	21
25	(Austria) Deni Cudic	18	Ret	DNS	DNS	22	12	21	17	Ret						4
Pos.	Rider	JER (Spain)		EST (Portugal)		SIL (United Kingdom)		ASS (Netherlands)		MUG (Italy)	SAC (Germany)		BRN (Czech Republic)		MIS (Italy)	Pts

Colour	Result
Gold	Winner
Silver	Second place
Bronze	Third place
Green	Points classification
Blue	Non-points classification
Blue	Non-classified finish (NC)
Purple	Retired, not classified (Ret)
Red	Did not qualify (DNQ)
Red	Did not pre-qualify (DNPQ)
Black	Disqualified (DSQ)
White	Did not start (DNS)
White	Withdrew (WD)
White	Race cancelled (C)
Blank	Did not practice (DNP)
Blank	Did not arrive (DNA)
Blank	Excluded (EX)

**Bold** – Pole position
Italics – Fastest lap
