= 2016 Malaysian motorcycle Grand Prix =

(Malaysia) 2016 Malaysian Grand Prix
Race details
- Race 17 of 18 races in the 2016 Grand Prix motorcycle racing season
- Date: 30 October 2016
- Official name: Shell Malaysia Motorcycle Grand Prix
- Location: Sepang International Circuit
- Course: Permanent racing facility; 5.543 km (3.444 mi)

MotoGP
Pole position
Rider	(Italy) Andrea Dovizioso	Ducati
Time	2:11.485	
Fastest lap
Rider	(Italy) Andrea Dovizioso	Ducati
Time	2:11.950 on lap 12	
Podium
First	(Italy) Andrea Dovizioso	Ducati
Second	(Italy) Valentino Rossi	Yamaha
Third	(Spain) Jorge Lorenzo	Yamaha

Moto2
Pole position
Rider	(France) Johann Zarco	Kalex
Time	2:18.621	
Fastest lap
Rider	(Italy) Luca Marini	Kalex
Time	2:21.475 on lap 19	
Podium
First	(France) Johann Zarco	Kalex
Second	(Italy) Franco Morbidelli	Kalex
Third	(Germany) Jonas Folger	Kalex

Moto3
Pole position
Rider	(South Africa) Brad Binder	KTM
Time	2:26.268	
Fastest lap
Rider	(Spain) Joan Mir	KTM
Time	2:14.201 on lap 2	
Podium
First	(Italy) Francesco Bagnaia	Mahindra
Second	(Czech Republic) Jakub Kornfeil	Honda
Third	(Netherlands) Bo Bendsneyder	KTM

The 2016 Malaysian motorcycle Grand Prix was the seventeenth round of the 2016 MotoGP season. It was held at the Sepang International Circuit in Sepang on 30 October 2016.

== Classification ==
=== MotoGP ===
The race, originally scheduled for 20 laps, was shortened to 19 laps after the start was delayed by 20 minutes due to torrential rain.

Pos.	No.	Rider	Team	Manufacturer	Laps	Time/Retired	Grid	Points
1	4	(Italy) Andrea Dovizioso	Ducati Team	Ducati	19	42:27.333	1	25
2	46	(Italy) Valentino Rossi	Movistar Yamaha MotoGP	Yamaha	19	+3.115	2	20
3	99	(Spain) Jorge Lorenzo	Movistar Yamaha MotoGP	Yamaha	19	+11.924	3	16
4	8	(Spain) Héctor Barberá	Avintia Racing	Ducati	19	+19.916	12	13
5	76	(France) Loris Baz	Avintia Racing	Ducati	19	+21.353	10	11
6	25	(Spain) Maverick Viñales	Team Suzuki Ecstar	Suzuki	19	+22.932	8	10
7	19	(Spain) Álvaro Bautista	Aprilia Racing Team Gresini	Aprilia	19	+25.829	9	9
8	43	(Australia) Jack Miller	Estrella Galicia 0,0 Marc VDS	Honda	19	+32.746	14	8
9	44	(Spain) Pol Espargaró	Monster Yamaha Tech 3	Yamaha	19	+33.704	11	7
10	9	(Italy) Danilo Petrucci	Octo Pramac Yakhnich	Ducati	19	+34.280	15	6
11	93	(Spain) Marc Márquez	Repsol Honda Team	Honda	19	+36.480	4	5
12	50	(Republic of Ireland) Eugene Laverty	Pull & Bear Aspar Team	Ducati	19	+36.638	19	4
13	41	(Spain) Aleix Espargaró	Team Suzuki Ecstar	Suzuki	19	+36.897	7	3
14	38	(United Kingdom) Bradley Smith	Monster Yamaha Tech 3	Yamaha	19	+45.609	13	2
15	45	(United Kingdom) Scott Redding	Octo Pramac Yakhnich	Ducati	19	+49.779	18	1
16	7	(Japan) Hiroshi Aoyama	Repsol Honda Team	Honda	19	+52.665	17	
17	6	(Germany) Stefan Bradl	Aprilia Racing Team Gresini	Aprilia	19	+52.784	16	
18	53	(Spain) Tito Rabat	Estrella Galicia 0,0 Marc VDS	Honda	19	+54.891	21	
Ret	29	(Italy) Andrea Iannone	Ducati Team	Ducati	12	Accident	6	
Ret	35	(United Kingdom) Cal Crutchlow	LCR Honda	Honda	11	Accident	5	
Ret	68	(Colombia) Yonny Hernández	Pull & Bear Aspar Team	Ducati	11	Front Tyre Wear	20	

== Moto2 race report ==
In the Moto2 class, Johann Zarco successfully defended the Moto2 title, thus becoming the first Moto2 rider to win two Moto2 title and the first since Jorge Lorenzo in 2007 to win a back-to-back intermediate class title.

=== Moto2 ===
Pos.	No.	Rider	Manufacturer	Laps	Time/Retired	Grid	Points
1	5	(France) Johann Zarco	Kalex	19	45:51.036	1	25
2	21	(Italy) Franco Morbidelli	Kalex	19	+3.256	2	20
3	94	(Germany) Jonas Folger	Kalex	19	+3.689	4	16
4	7	(Italy) Lorenzo Baldassarri	Kalex	19	+21.428	6	13
5	55	(Malaysia) Hafizh Syahrin	Kalex	19	+24.700	14	11
6	12	(Switzerland) Thomas Lüthi	Kalex	19	+26.184	5	10
7	73	(Spain) Álex Márquez	Kalex	19	+28.177	21	9
8	97	(Spain) Xavi Vierge	Tech 3	19	+28.855	25	8
9	10	(Italy) Luca Marini	Kalex	19	+29.247	11	7
10	32	(Spain) Isaac Viñales	Tech 3	19	+29.969	19	6
11	24	(Italy) Simone Corsi	Speed Up	19	+30.866	10	5
12	93	(Malaysia) Ramdan Rosli	Kalex	19	+31.260	12	4
13	87	(Australia) Remy Gardner	Kalex	19	+31.793	9	3
14	40	(Spain) Álex Rins	Kalex	19	+34.697	23	2
15	19	(Belgium) Xavier Siméon	Speed Up	19	+46.669	7	1
16	2	(Switzerland) Jesko Raffin	Kalex	19	+49.126	27	
17	11	(Germany) Sandro Cortese	Kalex	19	+49.293	15	
18	52	(United Kingdom) Danny Kent	Kalex	19	+51.610	24	
19	57	(Spain) Edgar Pons	Kalex	19	+54.949	18	
20	23	(Germany) Marcel Schrötter	Kalex	19	+55.461	22	
21	30	(Japan) Takaaki Nakagami	Kalex	19	+1:08.613	20	
22	27	(Spain) Iker Lecuona	Kalex	19	+1:16.574	17	
23	54	(Italy) Mattia Pasini	Kalex	19	+1:25.838	8	
24	14	(Thailand) Ratthapark Wilairot	Kalex	19	+2:01.635	26	
Ret	20	(Italy) Alessandro Nocco	Kalex	12	Accident Damage	16	
Ret	70	(Switzerland) Robin Mulhauser	Kalex	5	Rear Tyre	28	
Ret	49	(Spain) Axel Pons	Kalex	1	Accident	3	
Ret	22	(United Kingdom) Sam Lowes	Kalex	1	Accident	13	
WD	60	(Spain) Julián Simón	Speed Up		Withdrew		
OFFICIAL MOTO2 REPORT

- Julian Simon withdrew from the event after suffering a broken vertebrae in a crash during Friday free practice.

=== Moto3 ===
The race, originally scheduled for 18 laps, was red-flagged on lap 15 after Maria Herrera crashed into the back of Livio Loi in Turn 15. Since two thirds of the original distance required to award full points was completed, the race was not restarted. Maria Herrera was not classified in the final results since she failed to recover her bike into pit-lane within five minutes of the race being red-flagged (as required by the rules).

Pos.	No.	Rider	Manufacturer	Laps	Time/Retired	Grid	Points
1	21	(Italy) Francesco Bagnaia	Mahindra	13	29:29.351	3	25
2	84	(Czech Republic) Jakub Kornfeil	Honda	13	+7.108	15	20
3	64	(Netherlands) Bo Bendsneyder	KTM	13	+7.253	7	16
4	20	(France) Fabio Quartararo	KTM	13	+8.469	9	13
5	55	(Italy) Andrea Locatelli	KTM	13	+12.414	11	11
6	42	(Spain) Marcos Ramírez	Mahindra	13	+12.706	27	10
7	19	(Argentina) Gabriel Rodrigo	KTM	13	+13.387	5	9
8	89	(Malaysia) Khairul Idham Pawi	Honda	13	+13.506	20	8
9	11	(Belgium) Livio Loi	Honda	13	+14.445	23	7
10	40	(South Africa) Darryn Binder	Mahindra	13	+38.777	30	6
11	38	(Malaysia) Hafiq Azmi	Peugeot	13	+45.827	22	5
12	23	(Italy) Niccolò Antonelli	Honda	13	+48.899	6	4
13	43	(Italy) Stefano Valtulini	Mahindra	13	+49.648	29	3
14	77	(Italy) Lorenzo Petrarca	Mahindra	13	+49.842	28	2
15	4	(Italy) Fabio Di Giannantonio	Honda	13	+1:15.163	19	1
16	48	(Italy) Lorenzo Dalla Porta	KTM	12	+1 lap	4	
17	41	(South Africa) Brad Binder	KTM	10	+3 laps	1	
NC	6	(Spain) María Herrera	KTM	13	+13.793	31	
Ret	95	(France) Jules Danilo	Honda	6	Accident	24	
Ret	9	(Spain) Jorge Navarro	Honda	5	Accident Damage	2	
Ret	12	(Spain) Albert Arenas	Peugeot	3	Accident	26	
Ret	36	(Spain) Joan Mir	KTM	2	Accident	14	
Ret	24	(Japan) Tatsuki Suzuki	Mahindra	2	Accident	16	
Ret	16	(Italy) Andrea Migno	KTM	2	Accident Damage	25	
Ret	8	(Italy) Nicolò Bulega	KTM	1	Accident Damage	13	
Ret	88	(Spain) Jorge Martín	Mahindra	0	Accident	8	
Ret	44	(Spain) Arón Canet	Honda	0	Collision	10	
Ret	65	(Germany) Philipp Öttl	KTM	0	Collision	12	
Ret	58	(Spain) Juan Francisco Guevara	KTM	0	Collision	17	
Ret	7	(Malaysia) Adam Norrodin	Honda	0	Collision	18	
Ret	71	(Japan) Ayumu Sasaki	Honda	0	Collision	21	
DNS	76	(Japan) Hiroki Ono	Honda		Did not start		
DNS	3	(Italy) Fabio Spiranelli	Mahindra		Did not start		
OFFICIAL MOTO3 REPORT

- Hiroki Ono withdrew from the event following a concussion suffered in a crash during qualifying.
- Fabio Spiranelli was injured in a scooter crash during a track familiarisation run on Thursday prior to the race and withdrew from the event after the opening Friday practice session.

== Championship standings after the race (MotoGP) ==
Below are the standings for the top five riders and constructors after round seventeen has concluded.

Riders' Championship standings

Pos.	Rider	Points
1	(Spain) Marc Marquez	278
2	(Italy) Valentino Rossi	236
3	(Spain) Jorge Lorenzo	208
4	(Spain) Maverick Vinales	191
5	(Italy) Andrea Dovizioso	162

Constructors' Championship standings

Pos.	Constructor	Points
1	(Japan) Honda	349
2	(Japan) Yamaha	328
3	(Italy) Ducati	245
4	(Japan) Suzuki	197
5	(Italy) Aprilia	95

- Note: Only the top five positions are included for both sets of standings.

Previous race: 2016 Australian Grand Prix	FIM Grand Prix World Championship; 2016 season	Next race: 2016 Valencian Grand Prix
Previous race: 2015 Malaysian Grand Prix	Malaysian motorcycle Grand Prix	Next race: 2017 Malaysian Grand Prix
