= 2016 Czech Republic motorcycle Grand Prix =

2016 Czech Republic Grand Prix
Race details
- Race 11 of 18 races in the 2016 Grand Prix motorcycle racing season
- Date: 21 August 2016
- Official name: HJC Helmets Grand Prix České republiky
- Location: Brno Circuit
- Course: Permanent racing facility; 5.403 km (3.357 mi)

MotoGP
Pole position
Rider	(Spain) Marc Márquez	Honda
Time	1:54.596	
Fastest lap
Rider	(United Kingdom) Cal Crutchlow	Honda
Time	2:08.216 on lap 9	
Podium
First	(United Kingdom) Cal Crutchlow	Honda
Second	(Italy) Valentino Rossi	Yamaha
Third	(Spain) Marc Márquez	Honda

Moto2
Pole position
Rider	(France) Johann Zarco	Kalex
Time	2:01.581	
Fastest lap
Rider	(Germany) Jonas Folger	Kalex
Time	2:14.528 on lap 11	
Podium
First	(Germany) Jonas Folger	Kalex
Second	(Spain) Álex Rins	Kalex
Third	(United Kingdom) Sam Lowes	Kalex

Moto3
Pole position
Rider	(South Africa) Brad Binder	KTM
Time	2:07.785	
Fastest lap
Rider	(South Africa) Brad Binder	KTM
Time	2:21.567 on lap 11	
Podium
First	(United Kingdom) John McPhee	Peugeot
Second	(Spain) Jorge Martín	Mahindra
Third	(Italy) Fabio Di Giannantonio	Honda

The 2016 Czech Republic motorcycle Grand Prix was the eleventh round of the 2016 MotoGP season. It was held at the Brno Circuit in Brno on 21 August 2016.

== Classification ==
=== MotoGP ===
Pos.	No.	Rider	Team	Manufacturer	Laps	Time/Retired	Grid	Points
1	35	(United Kingdom) Cal Crutchlow	LCR Honda	Honda	22	47:44.290	10	25
2	46	(Italy) Valentino Rossi	Movistar Yamaha MotoGP	Yamaha	22	+7.298	6	20
3	93	(Spain) Marc Márquez	Repsol Honda Team	Honda	22	+9.587	1	16
4	76	(France) Loris Baz	Avintia Racing	Ducati	22	+12.558	17	13
5	8	(Spain) Héctor Barberá	Avintia Racing	Ducati	22	+13.093	5	11
6	50	(Republic of Ireland) Eugene Laverty	Pull & Bear Aspar Team	Ducati	22	+13.812	14	10
7	9	(Italy) Danilo Petrucci	Octo Pramac Yakhnich	Ducati	22	+23.414	16	9
8	29	(Italy) Andrea Iannone	Ducati Team	Ducati	22	+24.562	3	8
9	25	(Spain) Maverick Viñales	Team Suzuki Ecstar	Suzuki	22	+24.581	8	7
10	53	(Spain) Tito Rabat	Estrella Galicia 0,0 Marc VDS	Honda	22	+37.131	20	6
11	68	(Colombia) Yonny Hernández	Pull & Bear Aspar Team	Ducati	22	+39.911	18	5
12	26	(Spain) Dani Pedrosa	Repsol Honda Team	Honda	22	+41.097	9	4
13	44	(Spain) Pol Espargaró	Monster Yamaha Tech 3	Yamaha	22	+43.202	12	3
14	6	(Germany) Stefan Bradl	Aprilia Racing Team Gresini	Aprilia	22	+45.687	15	2
15	45	(United Kingdom) Scott Redding	Octo Pramac Yakhnich	Ducati	22	+1:02.201	13	1
16	19	(Spain) Álvaro Bautista	Aprilia Racing Team Gresini	Aprilia	22	+1:18.841	19	
17	99	(Spain) Jorge Lorenzo	Movistar Yamaha MotoGP	Yamaha	21	+1 lap	2	
Ret	4	(Italy) Andrea Dovizioso	Ducati Team	Ducati	15	Handling	7	
Ret	38	(United Kingdom) Bradley Smith	Monster Yamaha Tech 3	Yamaha	14	Mechanical	11	
Ret	41	(Spain) Aleix Espargaró	Team Suzuki Ecstar	Suzuki	13	Engine	4	

=== Moto2 ===
Pos.	No.	Rider	Manufacturer	Laps	Time/Retired	Grid	Points
1	94	(Germany) Jonas Folger	Kalex	20	45:30.342	7	25
2	40	(Spain) Álex Rins	Kalex	20	+5.175	6	20
3	22	(United Kingdom) Sam Lowes	Kalex	20	+9.021	2	16
4	54	(Italy) Mattia Pasini	Kalex	20	+14.763	16	13
5	73	(Spain) Álex Márquez	Kalex	20	+17.959	3	11
6	55	(Malaysia) Hafizh Syahrin	Kalex	20	+24.247	13	10
7	52	(United Kingdom) Danny Kent	Kalex	20	+25.696	15	9
8	21	(Italy) Franco Morbidelli	Kalex	20	+25.916	5	8
9	44	(Portugal) Miguel Oliveira	Kalex	20	+27.199	9	7
10	95	(Australia) Anthony West	Suter	20	+36.340	28	6
11	5	(France) Johann Zarco	Kalex	20	+36.754	1	5
12	97	(Spain) Xavi Vierge	Tech 3	20	+37.377	23	4
13	60	(Spain) Julián Simón	Speed Up	20	+37.456	18	3
14	32	(Spain) Isaac Viñales	Tech 3	20	+37.579	26	2
15	19	(Belgium) Xavier Siméon	Speed Up	20	+37.776	24	1
16	7	(Italy) Lorenzo Baldassarri	Kalex	20	+49.011	19	
17	77	(Switzerland) Dominique Aegerter	Kalex	20	+1:01.767	12	
18	23	(Germany) Marcel Schrötter	Kalex	20	+1:08.803	10	
19	24	(Italy) Simone Corsi	Speed Up	20	+1:09.535	8	
20	57	(Spain) Edgar Pons	Kalex	20	+1:09.554	14	
21	87	(Australia) Remy Gardner	Kalex	20	+1:16.694	20	
22	70	(Switzerland) Robin Mulhauser	Kalex	20	+1:16.851	25	
23	11	(Germany) Sandro Cortese	Kalex	20	+1:17.235	11	
24	2	(Switzerland) Jesko Raffin	Kalex	20	+1:43.708	27	
25	14	(Thailand) Ratthapark Wilairot	Kalex	19	+1 lap	21	
Ret	30	(Japan) Takaaki Nakagami	Kalex	11	Collision Damage	4	
Ret	10	(Italy) Luca Marini	Kalex	10	Accident	17	
Ret	49	(Spain) Axel Pons	Kalex	0	Accident	14	
DNS	12	(Switzerland) Thomas Lüthi	Kalex		Did not start		
OFFICIAL MOTO2 REPORT

- Thomas Lüthi suffered a concussion in a crash during qualifying.

=== Moto3 ===
Pos.	No.	Rider	Manufacturer	Laps	Time/Retired	Grid	Points
1	17	(United Kingdom) John McPhee	Peugeot	19	45:36.087	9	25
2	88	(Spain) Jorge Martín	Mahindra	19	+8.806	3	20
3	4	(Italy) Fabio Di Giannantonio	Honda	19	+9.777	4	16
4	33	(Italy) Enea Bastianini	Honda	19	+10.654	2	13
5	23	(Italy) Niccolò Antonelli	Honda	19	+13.872	10	11
6	84	(Czech Republic) Jakub Kornfeil	Honda	19	+15.533	8	10
7	64	(Netherlands) Bo Bendsneyder	KTM	19	+15.819	24	9
8	36	(Spain) Joan Mir	KTM	19	+16.289	14	8
9	8	(Italy) Nicolò Bulega	KTM	19	+16.473	6	7
10	9	(Spain) Jorge Navarro	Honda	19	+16.681	11	6
11	95	(France) Jules Danilo	Honda	19	+18.198	23	5
12	16	(Italy) Andrea Migno	KTM	19	+21.640	5	4
13	24	(Japan) Tatsuki Suzuki	Mahindra	19	+31.007	25	3
14	11	(Belgium) Livio Loi	Honda	19	+36.895	19	2
15	65	(Germany) Philipp Öttl	KTM	19	+43.651	12	1
16	98	(Czech Republic) Karel Hanika	KTM	19	+57.814	13	
17	19	(Argentina) Gabriel Rodrigo	KTM	19	+1:01.428	21	
18	42	(Spain) Marcos Ramírez	Mahindra	19	+1:04.134	29	
19	6	(Spain) María Herrera	KTM	19	+1:27.585	27	
20	76	(Japan) Hiroki Ono	Honda	19	+1:27.997	17	
21	20	(France) Fabio Quartararo	KTM	19	+1:33.942	26	
22	3	(Italy) Fabio Spiranelli	Mahindra	19	+1:34.610	33	
23	58	(Spain) Juan Francisco Guevara	KTM	19	+1:34.942	15	
24	77	(Italy) Lorenzo Petrarca	Mahindra	19	+2:08.319	32	
Ret	55	(Italy) Andrea Locatelli	KTM	16	Accident	18	
Ret	41	(South Africa) Brad Binder	KTM	14	Accident	1	
Ret	89	(Malaysia) Khairul Idham Pawi	Honda	14	Accident	28	
Ret	43	(Italy) Stefano Valtulini	Mahindra	14	Accident	30	
Ret	40	(South Africa) Darryn Binder	Mahindra	13	Accident	22	
Ret	21	(Italy) Francesco Bagnaia	Mahindra	12	Accident	16	
Ret	12	(Spain) Albert Arenas	Peugeot	11	Accident	31	
Ret	7	(Malaysia) Adam Norrodin	Honda	9	Accident	20	
Ret	44	(Spain) Arón Canet	Honda	8	Accident	7	
OFFICIAL MOTO3 REPORT

== Championship standings after the race (MotoGP) ==
Below are the standings for the top five riders and constructors after round eleven has concluded.

Riders' Championship standings

Pos.	Rider	Points
1	(Spain) Marc Marquez	197
2	(Italy) Valentino Rossi	144
3	(Spain) Jorge Lorenzo	138
4	(Spain) Dani Pedrosa	109
5	(Spain) Maverick Vinales	100

Constructors' Championship standings

Pos.	Constructor	Points
1	(Japan) Yamaha	222
2	(Japan) Honda	221
3	(Italy) Ducati	162
4	(Japan) Suzuki	106
5	(Italy) Aprilia	53

- Note: Only the top five positions are included for both sets of standings.

Previous race: 2016 Austrian Grand Prix	FIM Grand Prix World Championship; 2016 season	Next race: 2016 British Grand Prix
Previous race: 2015 Czech Republic Grand Prix	Czech Republic motorcycle Grand Prix	Next race: 2017 Czech Republic Grand Prix
