= 2016 Spanish motorcycle Grand Prix =

(Spain) 2016 Spanish Grand Prix
Race details
- Race 4 of 18 races in the 2016 Grand Prix motorcycle racing season
- Date: 24 April 2016
- Official name: Gran Premio Red Bull de España
- Location: Circuito de Jerez
- Course: Permanent racing facility; 4.423 km (2.748 mi)

MotoGP
Pole position
Rider	(Italy) Valentino Rossi	Yamaha
Time	1:38.736	
Fastest lap
Rider	(Italy) Valentino Rossi	Yamaha
Time	1:40.090 on lap 3	
Podium
First	(Italy) Valentino Rossi	Yamaha
Second	(Spain) Jorge Lorenzo	Yamaha
Third	(Spain) Marc Márquez	Honda

Moto2
Pole position
Rider	(United Kingdom) Sam Lowes	Kalex
Time	1:42.408	
Fastest lap
Rider	(Spain) Álex Rins	Kalex
Time	1:42.979 on lap 3	
Podium
First	(United Kingdom) Sam Lowes	Kalex
Second	(Germany) Jonas Folger	Kalex
Third	(Spain) Álex Rins	Kalex

Moto3
Pole position
Rider	(Italy) Nicolò Bulega	KTM
Time	1:46.223	
Fastest lap
Rider	(South Africa) Brad Binder	KTM
Time	1:46.922 on lap 4	
Podium
First	(South Africa) Brad Binder	KTM
Second	(Italy) Nicolò Bulega	KTM
Third	(Italy) Francesco Bagnaia	Mahindra

The 2016 Spanish motorcycle Grand Prix was the fourth round of the 2016 Grand Prix motorcycle racing season. It was held at the Circuito de Jerez in Jerez de la Frontera on 24 April 2016.

== Classification ==
=== MotoGP ===
Pos.	No.	Rider	Team	Manufacturer	Laps	Time/Retired	Grid	Points
1	46	(Italy) Valentino Rossi	Movistar Yamaha MotoGP	Yamaha	27	45:28.834	1	25
2	99	(Spain) Jorge Lorenzo	Movistar Yamaha MotoGP	Yamaha	27	+2.386	2	20
3	93	(Spain) Marc Márquez	Repsol Honda Team	Honda	27	+7.087	3	16
4	26	(Spain) Dani Pedrosa	Repsol Honda Team	Honda	27	+10.351	7	13
5	41	(Spain) Aleix Espargaró	Team Suzuki Ecstar	Suzuki	27	+14.143	6	11
6	25	(Spain) Maverick Viñales	Team Suzuki Ecstar	Suzuki	27	+16.772	5	10
7	29	(Italy) Andrea Iannone	Ducati Team	Ducati	27	+26.277	11	9
8	44	(Spain) Pol Espargaró	Monster Yamaha Tech 3	Yamaha	27	+30.750	8	8
9	50	(Republic of Ireland) Eugene Laverty	Aspar Team MotoGP	Ducati	27	+32.325	15	7
10	8	(Spain) Héctor Barberá	Avintia Racing	Ducati	27	+32.624	9	6
11	35	(United Kingdom) Cal Crutchlow	LCR Honda	Honda	27	+38.497	10	5
12	38	(United Kingdom) Bradley Smith	Monster Yamaha Tech 3	Yamaha	27	+39.669	14	4
13	76	(France) Loris Baz	Avintia Racing	Ducati	27	+45.227	12	3
14	6	(Germany) Stefan Bradl	Aprilia Racing Team Gresini	Aprilia	27	+47.886	18	2
15	68	(Colombia) Yonny Hernández	Aspar Team MotoGP	Ducati	27	+47.988	16	1
16	51	(Italy) Michele Pirro	Octo Pramac Yakhnich	Ducati	27	+49.414	20	
17	43	(Australia) Jack Miller	Estrella Galicia 0,0 Marc VDS	Honda	27	+49.513	19	
18	53	(Spain) Tito Rabat	Estrella Galicia 0,0 Marc VDS	Honda	27	+53.334	21	
19	45	(United Kingdom) Scott Redding	Octo Pramac Yakhnich	Ducati	27	+1:05.555	17	
Ret	4	(Italy) Andrea Dovizioso	Ducati Team	Ducati	9	Water Pump	4	
Ret	19	(Spain) Álvaro Bautista	Aprilia Racing Team Gresini	Aprilia	5	Accident	13	

=== Moto2 ===
Pos.	No.	Rider	Manufacturer	Laps	Time/Retired	Grid	Points
1	22	(United Kingdom) Sam Lowes	Kalex	26	44:58.624	1	25
2	94	(Germany) Jonas Folger	Kalex	26	+2.480	2	20
3	40	(Spain) Álex Rins	Kalex	26	+8.113	7	16
4	21	(Italy) Franco Morbidelli	Kalex	26	+10.659	4	13
5	5	(France) Johann Zarco	Kalex	26	+14.594	15	11
6	12	(Switzerland) Thomas Lüthi	Kalex	26	+16.019	5	10
7	30	(Japan) Takaaki Nakagami	Kalex	26	+16.352	12	9
8	77	(Switzerland) Dominique Aegerter	Kalex	26	+18.433	18	8
9	39	(Spain) Luis Salom	Kalex	26	+21.502	10	7
10	19	(Belgium) Xavier Siméon	Speed Up	26	+31.300	19	6
11	55	(Malaysia) Hafizh Syahrin	Kalex	26	+35.980	22	5
12	54	(Italy) Mattia Pasini	Kalex	26	+37.348	25	4
13	32	(Spain) Isaac Viñales	Tech 3	26	+37.454	23	3
14	2	(Switzerland) Jesko Raffin	Kalex	26	+48.923	24	2
15	70	(Switzerland) Robin Mulhauser	Kalex	26	+55.832	27	1
16	10	(Italy) Luca Marini	Kalex	26	+1:01.795	11	
17	7	(Italy) Lorenzo Baldassarri	Kalex	26	+1:09.465	6	
18	42	(Italy) Federico Fuligni	Kalex	26	+1:10.201	28	
19	33	(Italy) Alessandro Tonucci	Kalex	26	+1:10.642	26	
Ret	44	(Portugal) Miguel Oliveira	Kalex	20	Accident	14	
Ret	23	(Germany) Marcel Schrötter	Kalex	11	Accident	13	
Ret	52	(United Kingdom) Danny Kent	Kalex	5	Accident Damage	16	
Ret	49	(Spain) Axel Pons	Kalex	5	Retirement	17	
Ret	11	(Germany) Sandro Cortese	Kalex	4	Accident	3	
Ret	73	(Spain) Álex Márquez	Kalex	2	Accident	9	
Ret	24	(Italy) Simone Corsi	Speed Up	1	Accident Damage	8	
Ret	14	(Thailand) Ratthapark Wilairot	Kalex	0	Accident	20	
Ret	97	(Spain) Xavi Vierge	Tech 3	0	Accident	21	
DNS	60	(Spain) Julián Simón	Speed Up		Did not start		
DNS	57	(Spain) Edgar Pons	Kalex		Did not start		
OFFICIAL MOTO2 REPORT

=== Moto3 ===
Pos.	No.	Rider	Manufacturer	Laps	Time/Retired	Grid	Points
1	41	(South Africa) Brad Binder	KTM	23	41:29.882	35	25
2	8	(Italy) Nicolò Bulega	KTM	23	+3.336	1	20
3	21	(Italy) Francesco Bagnaia	Mahindra	23	+3.441	3	16
4	9	(Spain) Jorge Navarro	Honda	23	+3.513	2	13
5	84	(Czech Republic) Jakub Kornfeil	Honda	23	+13.728	9	11
6	36	(Spain) Joan Mir	KTM	23	+13.933	6	10
7	5	(Italy) Romano Fenati	KTM	23	+13.993	8	9
8	33	(Italy) Enea Bastianini	Honda	23	+14.052	5	8
9	95	(France) Jules Danilo	Honda	23	+14.409	14	7
10	65	(Germany) Philipp Öttl	KTM	23	+14.588	12	6
11	16	(Italy) Andrea Migno	KTM	23	+14.874	16	5
12	58	(Spain) Juan Francisco Guevara	KTM	23	+30.317	7	4
13	19	(Argentina) Gabriel Rodrigo	KTM	23	+30.668	22	3
14	89	(Malaysia) Khairul Idham Pawi	Honda	23	+35.746	23	2
15	24	(Japan) Tatsuki Suzuki	Mahindra	23	+35.783	20	1
16	7	(Malaysia) Adam Norrodin	Honda	23	+35.907	27	
17	11	(Belgium) Livio Loi	Honda	23	+36.085	19	
18	12	(Spain) Albert Arenas	Mahindra	23	+36.307	15	
19	6	(Spain) María Herrera	KTM	23	+45.591	32	
20	37	(Italy) Davide Pizzoli	KTM	23	+50.768	28	
21	64	(Netherlands) Bo Bendsneyder	KTM	23	+53.795	17	
22	99	(France) Enzo Boulom	KTM	23	+53.985	34	
23	3	(Italy) Fabio Spiranelli	Mahindra	23	+1:22.026	33	
Ret	4	(Italy) Fabio Di Giannantonio	Honda	22	Accident	21	
Ret	40	(South Africa) Darryn Binder	Mahindra	16	Retirement	30	
Ret	10	(France) Alexis Masbou	Peugeot	16	Retirement	29	
Ret	23	(Italy) Niccolò Antonelli	Honda	11	Accident	4	
Ret	17	(United Kingdom) John McPhee	Peugeot	8	Accident	24	
Ret	20	(France) Fabio Quartararo	KTM	6	Accident Damage	11	
Ret	44	(Spain) Arón Canet	Honda	5	Accident	10	
Ret	98	(Czech Republic) Karel Hanika	Mahindra	2	Accident	25	
Ret	76	(Japan) Hiroki Ono	Honda	2	Accident	18	
Ret	55	(Italy) Andrea Locatelli	KTM	2	Accident	26	
Ret	77	(Italy) Lorenzo Petrarca	Mahindra	2	Accident	31	
Ret	88	(Spain) Jorge Martín	Mahindra	0	Collision	13	
DNS	43	(Italy) Stefano Valtulini	Mahindra		Did not start		
OFFICIAL MOTO3 REPORT

== Championship standings after the race (MotoGP) ==
Below are the standings for the top five riders and constructors after round four has concluded.

Riders' Championship standings

Pos.	Rider	Points
1	(Spain) Marc Marquez	82
2	(Spain) Jorge Lorenzo	65
3	(Italy) Valentino Rossi	58
4	(Spain) Dani Pedrosa	40
5	(Spain) Pol Espargaro	36

Constructors' Championship standings

Pos.	Constructor	Points
1	(Japan) Yamaha	90
2	(Japan) Honda	82
3	(Italy) Ducati	58
4	(Japan) Suzuki	39
5	(Italy) Aprilia	20

- Note: Only the top five positions are included for both sets of standings.

Previous race: 2016 Grand Prix of the Americas	FIM Grand Prix World Championship; 2016 season	Next race: 2016 French Grand Prix
Previous race: 2015 Spanish Grand Prix	Spanish motorcycle Grand Prix	Next race: 2017 Spanish Grand Prix
