= 2016 Italian motorcycle Grand Prix =

(Italy) 2016 Italian Grand Prix
Race details
- Race 6 of 18 races in the 2016 Grand Prix motorcycle racing season
- Date: 22 May 2016
- Official name: Gran Premio d'Italia TIM
- Location: Autodromo Internazionale del Mugello
- Course: Permanent racing facility; 5.245 km (3.259 mi)

MotoGP
Pole position
Rider	(Italy) Valentino Rossi	Yamaha
Time	1:46.504	
Fastest lap
Rider	(Italy) Andrea Iannone	Ducati
Time	1:47.687 on lap 23	
Podium
First	(Spain) Jorge Lorenzo	Yamaha
Second	(Spain) Marc Márquez	Honda
Third	(Italy) Andrea Iannone	Ducati

Moto2
Pole position
Rider	(United Kingdom) Sam Lowes	Kalex
Time	1:51.965	
Fastest lap
Rider	(Switzerland) Thomas Lüthi	Kalex
Time	1:52.718 on lap 3 (first part)	
Podium
First	(France) Johann Zarco	Kalex
Second	(Italy) Lorenzo Baldassarri	Kalex
Third	(United Kingdom) Sam Lowes	Kalex

Moto3
Pole position
Rider	(Italy) Romano Fenati	KTM
Time	1:57.289	
Fastest lap
Rider	(Spain) Juan Francisco Guevara	KTM
Time	1:58.009 on lap 3	
Podium
First	(South Africa) Brad Binder	KTM
Second	(Italy) Fabio Di Giannantonio	Honda
Third	(Italy) Francesco Bagnaia	Mahindra

The 2016 Italian motorcycle Grand Prix was the sixth round of the 2016 Grand Prix motorcycle racing season. It was held at the Autodromo Internazionale del Mugello in Scarperia on 22 May 2016. The MotoGP race was settled by a mere 0.019 seconds as Jorge Lorenzo pulled out of Marc Márquez' slipstream on the final straight on the final lap after a dramatic duel between the two, whilst polesitter Valentino Rossi lost a chance at challenging for a home win due to an engine failure. This race marks Rossi's first bike failure since the 2007 San Marino Grand Prix.

This race was the last race for Luis Salom before he was fatally injured after an accident during practice session at the following Grand Prix in Barcelona.

In the Moto3 class, Fabio Di Giannantonio took his first podium in what was just his 7th start.

== Classification ==
=== MotoGP ===
Pos.	No.	Rider	Team	Manufacturer	Laps	Time/Retired	Grid	Points
1	99	(Spain) Jorge Lorenzo	Movistar Yamaha MotoGP	Yamaha	23	41:36.535	5	25
2	93	(Spain) Marc Márquez	Repsol Honda Team	Honda	23	+0.019	4	20
3	29	(Italy) Andrea Iannone	Ducati Team	Ducati	23	+4.742	3	16
4	26	(Spain) Dani Pedrosa	Repsol Honda Team	Honda	23	+4.910	7	13
5	4	(Italy) Andrea Dovizioso	Ducati Team	Ducati	23	+6.256	13	11
6	25	(Spain) Maverick Viñales	Team Suzuki Ecstar	Suzuki	23	+8.670	2	10
7	38	(United Kingdom) Bradley Smith	Monster Yamaha Tech 3	Yamaha	23	+13.340	8	9
8	9	(Italy) Danilo Petrucci	Octo Pramac Yakhnich	Ducati	23	+14.598	9	8
9	41	(Spain) Aleix Espargaró	Team Suzuki Ecstar	Suzuki	23	+18.643	6	7
10	51	(Italy) Michele Pirro	Ducati Team	Ducati	23	+22.298	11	6
11	35	(United Kingdom) Cal Crutchlow	LCR Honda	Honda	23	+27.936	16	5
12	8	(Spain) Héctor Barberá	Avintia Racing	Ducati	23	+35.712	15	4
13	50	(Republic of Ireland) Eugene Laverty	Aspar Team MotoGP	Ducati	23	+38.032	18	3
14	6	(Germany) Stefan Bradl	Aprilia Racing Team Gresini	Aprilia	23	+40.094	20	2
15	44	(Spain) Pol Espargaró	Monster Yamaha Tech 3	Yamaha	23	+59.811	14	1
16	68	(Colombia) Yonny Hernández	Aspar Team MotoGP	Ducati	23	+1:04.397	12	
Ret	46	(Italy) Valentino Rossi	Movistar Yamaha MotoGP	Yamaha	8	Engine	1	
Ret	45	(United Kingdom) Scott Redding	Octo Pramac Yakhnich	Ducati	8	Electronics	10	
Ret	43	(Australia) Jack Miller	Estrella Galicia 0,0 Marc VDS	Honda	0	Accident	17	
Ret	19	(Spain) Álvaro Bautista	Aprilia Racing Team Gresini	Aprilia	0	Accident	19	
Ret	76	(France) Loris Baz	Avintia Racing	Ducati	0	Accident	21	
DNS	53	(Spain) Tito Rabat	Estrella Galicia 0,0 Marc VDS	Honda		Did not start		
Sources:

- Tito Rabat crashed in Free Practice 3 and suffered a broken collarbone.

=== Moto2 ===
The race, scheduled to be run for 21 laps, was red-flagged after Xavi Vierge crashed causing damage to an airfence and was later restarted over 10 laps.

Pos.	No.	Rider	Manufacturer	Laps	Time/Retired	Grid	Points
1	5	(France) Johann Zarco	Kalex	10	18:59.391	6	25
2	7	(Italy) Lorenzo Baldassarri	Kalex	10	+0.030	3	20
3	22	(United Kingdom) Sam Lowes	Kalex	10	+1.096	1	16
4	12	(Switzerland) Thomas Lüthi	Kalex	10	+1.215	7	13
5	55	(Malaysia) Hafizh Syahrin	Kalex	10	+1.653	15	11
6	49	(Spain) Axel Pons	Kalex	10	+2.110	4	10
7	40	(Spain) Álex Rins	Kalex	10	+5.649	9	9
8	21	(Italy) Franco Morbidelli	Kalex	10	+6.249	13	8
9	30	(Japan) Takaaki Nakagami	Kalex	10	+6.280	2	7
10	77	(Switzerland) Dominique Aegerter	Kalex	10	+6.322	12	6
11	11	(Germany) Sandro Cortese	Kalex	10	+6.720	11	5
12	24	(Italy) Simone Corsi	Speed Up	10	+7.659	8	4
13	44	(Portugal) Miguel Oliveira	Kalex	10	+7.718	21	3
14	52	(United Kingdom) Danny Kent	Kalex	10	+7.745	18	2
15	94	(Germany) Jonas Folger	Kalex	10	+8.046	17	1
16	73	(Spain) Álex Márquez	Kalex	10	+9.300	14	
17	60	(Spain) Julián Simón	Speed Up	10	+10.410	20	
18	23	(Germany) Marcel Schrötter	Kalex	10	+11.585	5	
19	88	(Spain) Ricard Cardús	Suter	10	+11.654	25	
20	42	(Italy) Federico Fuligni	Kalex	10	+14.739	28	
21	70	(Switzerland) Robin Mulhauser	Kalex	10	+15.089	24	
22	14	(Thailand) Ratthapark Wilairot	Kalex	10	+15.098	23	
23	57	(Spain) Edgar Pons	Kalex	10	+21.012	27	
24	32	(Spain) Isaac Viñales	Tech 3	10	+21.734	26	
25	33	(Italy) Alessandro Tonucci	Kalex	10	+30.005	30	
26	2	(Switzerland) Jesko Raffin	Kalex	10	+50.423	31	
Ret	39	(Spain) Luis Salom	Kalex	8	Accident	16	
Ret	54	(Italy) Mattia Pasini	Kalex	1	Accident	22	
DNS	19	(Belgium) Xavier Siméon	Speed Up	0	Did not restart	19	
DNS	10	(Italy) Luca Marini	Kalex	0	Did not restart	10	
DNS	97	(Spain) Xavi Vierge	Tech 3	0	Did not restart	29	
OFFICIAL MOTO2 REPORT

=== Moto3 ===
Pos.	No.	Rider	Manufacturer	Laps	Time/Retired	Grid	Points
1	41	(South Africa) Brad Binder	KTM	20	39:49.382	4	25
2	4	(Italy) Fabio Di Giannantonio	Honda	20	+0.038	16	20
3	21	(Italy) Francesco Bagnaia	Mahindra	20	+0.069	8	16
4	23	(Italy) Niccolò Antonelli	Honda	20	+0.075	21	13
5	20	(France) Fabio Quartararo	KTM	20	+0.077	18	11
6	76	(Japan) Hiroki Ono	Honda	20	+1.037	11	10
7	36	(Spain) Joan Mir	KTM	20	+1.532	10	9
8	8	(Italy) Nicolò Bulega	KTM	20	+1.538	7	8
9	58	(Spain) Juan Francisco Guevara	KTM	20	+1.567	29	7
10	16	(Italy) Andrea Migno	KTM	20	+1.762	2	6
11	95	(France) Jules Danilo	Honda	20	+1.791	25	5
12	33	(Italy) Enea Bastianini	Honda	20	+1.792	6	4
13	19	(Argentina) Gabriel Rodrigo	KTM	20	+1.933	24	3
14	88	(Spain) Jorge Martín	Mahindra	20	+2.011	14	2
15	48	(Italy) Lorenzo Dalla Porta	KTM	20	+2.041	13	1
16	11	(Belgium) Livio Loi	Honda	20	+2.391	22	
17	84	(Czech Republic) Jakub Kornfeil	Honda	20	+2.434	15	
18	64	(Netherlands) Bo Bendsneyder	KTM	20	+2.577	12	
19	24	(Japan) Tatsuki Suzuki	Mahindra	20	+2.775	20	
20	98	(Czech Republic) Karel Hanika	Mahindra	20	+4.289	19	
21	6	(Spain) María Herrera	KTM	20	+4.916	33	
22	7	(Malaysia) Adam Norrodin	Honda	20	+34.654	30	
23	17	(United Kingdom) John McPhee	Peugeot	20	+34.692	27	
24	43	(Italy) Stefano Valtulini	Mahindra	20	+34.739	28	
25	77	(Italy) Lorenzo Petrarca	Mahindra	20	+42.628	32	
Ret	44	(Spain) Arón Canet	Honda	19	Accident	9	
Ret	89	(Malaysia) Khairul Idham Pawi	Honda	19	Accident	3	
Ret	3	(Italy) Fabio Spiranelli	Mahindra	19	Accident	31	
Ret	55	(Italy) Andrea Locatelli	KTM	13	Accident	17	
Ret	9	(Spain) Jorge Navarro	Honda	11	Accident	5	
Ret	5	(Italy) Romano Fenati	KTM	9	Broken Chain	1	
Ret	40	(South Africa) Darryn Binder	Mahindra	7	Accident	23	
Ret	10	(France) Alexis Masbou	Peugeot	3	Retirement	26	
DNS	37	(Italy) Davide Pizzoli	KTM		Did not start		
OFFICIAL MOTO3 REPORT

- Davide Pizzoli withdrew after Free Practice 2 with a recurring ankle injury.

== Championship standings after the race (MotoGP) ==
Below are the standings for the top five riders and constructors after round six has concluded.

Riders' Championship standings

Pos.	Rider	Points
1	(Spain) Jorge Lorenzo	115
2	(Spain) Marc Marquez	105
3	(Italy) Valentino Rossi	78
4	(Spain) Dani Pedrosa	66
5	(Spain) Maverick Viñales	59

Constructors' Championship standings

Pos.	Constructor	Points
1	(Japan) Yamaha	140
2	(Japan) Honda	115
3	(Italy) Ducati	83
4	(Japan) Suzuki	65
5	(Italy) Aprilia	29

- Note: Only the top five positions are included for both sets of standings.

Previous race: 2016 French Grand Prix	FIM Grand Prix World Championship; 2016 season	Next race: 2016 Catalan Grand Prix
Previous race: 2015 Italian Grand Prix	Italian motorcycle Grand Prix	Next race: 2017 Italian Grand Prix
