= Livio Loi =

Belgian motorcycle racer

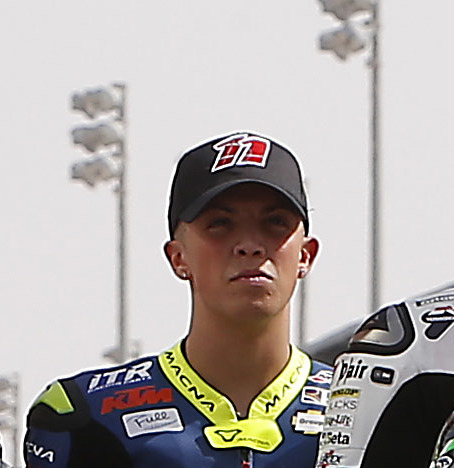
- Loi in 2018
- Nationality: Belgian
- Born: 27 April 1997 (age 29); Hasselt, Belgium
Motorcycle racing career statistics
Moto3 World Championship
Active years	2013–2018
Manufacturers	Kalex KTM, KTM, Honda
Championships	0
2018 championship position	32nd (8 pts)
Starts / Wins / Podiums / Poles / F. laps / Points; 84 / 1 / 2 / 0 / 1 / 232
Supersport 300 World Championship
Active years	2019
Manufacturers	Kawasaki
Championships	0
2019 championship position	24th (10 pts)
Starts / Wins / Podiums / Poles / F. laps / Points; 3 / 0 / 0 / 0 / 0 / 10

Livio Loi (born 27 April 1997 in Hasselt) is a Belgian professional Grand Prix motorcycle racer. He competed in the Moto3 World Championship in 2013 and the first half of the 2014 season for the Marc VDS Racing Team, before being replaced by Jorge Navarro.

In 2015, Loi returned to the series with RW Racing GP. After scoring 15 points in the first half of the season, Loi achieved his first Grand Prix victory at Indianapolis; in a wet-to-dry race, Loi started the race on slick tyres, and finished almost 40 seconds clear of the next rider, John McPhee. In 2016, Loi continued with the same team and the same bike as in the 2015 season, finishing all the races during the season, scoring 63 points and an 18th place in the rider's championship. Midway through the 2018 season, he was replaced by Vicente Pérez due to poor results.

Loi finished in 13th place on the final standings at 2017 Moto3 World Championship.

== Career statistics ==
=== Career highlights ===
- 2007: 1st, Belgian Pocketbike Championship, Junior A
- 2008: 1st, Belgian Pocketbike Championship, Junior B
- 2010: 1st, Dutch Pocketbike Championship
- 2010: 1st, European Pocketbike Championship
- 2021 : Kawasaki - Renzi Racing (CIV Supersport 600) #29

=== Red Bull MotoGP Rookies Cup ===
==== Races by year ====
(key) (Races in bold indicate pole position, races in italics indicate fastest lap)

Year	1	2	3	4	5	6	7	8	9	10	11	12	13	14	15	Pos	Pts
2012	SPA1; 13	SPA2; 8	POR1; 20	POR2; 11	GBR1; DNS	GBR2; 17	NED1; 22	NED2; 10	GER1; 12	GER2; 7	CZE1; 2	CZE2; 1	RSM; 3	ARA1; Ret	ARA2; NC	11th	96

=== FIM CEV Moto3 Championship ===
==== Races by year ====
(key) (Races in bold indicate pole position; races in italics indicate fastest lap)

Year	Bike	1	2	3	4	5	6	7	8	9	Pos	Pts
2012	Honda	JER	NAV	ARA	CAT	ALB1	ALB2; 13	VAL; 2			18th	23
2013	Kalex KTM	CAT1; 10	CAT2; 10	ARA	ALB1	ALB2	NAV	VAL1; 8	VAL1; 7	JER; 8	12th	37

=== Grand Prix motorcycle racing ===
==== By season ====
Season	Class	Motorcycle	Team	Race	Win	Podium	Pole	FLap	Pts	Plcd
2013	Moto3	Kalex KTM	Marc VDS Racing Team	15	0	0	0	0	8	22nd
2014	Moto3	Kalex KTM	Marc VDS Racing Team	9	0	0	0	0	17	21st
2014	Moto3	KTM	Marc VDS Racing Team	9	0	0	0	0	17	21st
2015	Moto3	Honda	RW Racing GP	18	1	1	0	0	56	16th
2016	Moto3	Honda	RW Racing GP BV	18	0	0	0	1	63	18th
2017	Moto3	Honda	Leopard Racing	16	0	1	0	0	80	13th
2018	Moto3	KTM	Reale Avintia	8	0	0	0	0	8	32nd
Total				**84**	**1**	**2**	**0**	**1**	**232**	

==== Races by year ====
(key) (Races in bold indicate pole position; races in italics indicate fastest lap)

Year	Class	Bike	1	2	3	4	5	6	7	8	9	10	11	12	13	14	15	16	17	18	19	Pos	Pts
2013	Moto3	Kalex KTM	QAT	AME	SPA; 15	FRA; 16	ITA; 25	CAT; Ret	NED; 23	GER; 22	INP; 14	CZE; 21	GBR; 19	RSM; 22	ARA; 15	MAL; 18	AUS; 18	JPN; 12	VAL; Ret			22nd	8
2014	Moto3	Kalex KTM	QAT; 17	AME; 12	ARG; 4	SPA; Ret	FRA; 20	ITA; 19	CAT; 25	NED; 25												21st	17
2014	Moto3	KTM									GER; Ret	INP	CZE	GBR	RSM	ARA	JPN	AUS	MAL	VAL		21st	17
2015	Moto3	Honda	QAT; Ret	AME; 25	ARG; 12	SPA; 13	FRA; 13	ITA; 14	CAT; 19	NED; 13	GER; 16	INP; 1	CZE; 18	GBR; 5	RSM; 12	ARA; 15	JPN; Ret	AUS; Ret	MAL; 19	VAL; 20		16th	56
2016	Moto3	Honda	QAT; 8	ARG; 16	AME; 8	SPA; 17	FRA; 11	ITA; 16	CAT; 16	NED; 15	GER; 14	AUT; 10	CZE; 14	GBR; 20	RSM; 13	ARA; 18	JPN; 7	AUS; 5	MAL; 9	VAL; 15		18th	63
2017	Moto3	Honda	QAT; 12	ARG; 6	AME; 15	SPA; 16	FRA; 16	ITA; 23	CAT; 25	NED; 21	GER; 7	CZE; 27	AUT; 4	GBR; 6	RSM; DNS	ARA	JPN; 19	AUS; 2	MAL; 4	VAL; 27		13th	80
2018	Moto3	KTM	QAT; Ret	ARG; 15	AME; 10	SPA; 18	FRA; 21	ITA; 24	CAT; 15	NED; 24	GER	CZE	AUT	GBR	RSM	ARA	THA	JPN	AUS	MAL	VAL	32nd	8

=== Supersport 300 World Championship ===
==== Races by year ====
(key) (Races in bold indicate pole position; races in italics indicate fastest lap)

Year	Bike	1	2	3	4	5	6	7	8	9	10	Pos	Pts
2019	Kawasaki	SPA	NED	ITA	SPA	SPA	ITA	GBR; 21	POR; 24	FRA; 6	QAT	24th	10
