= Luca Grünwald =

German motorcycle racer

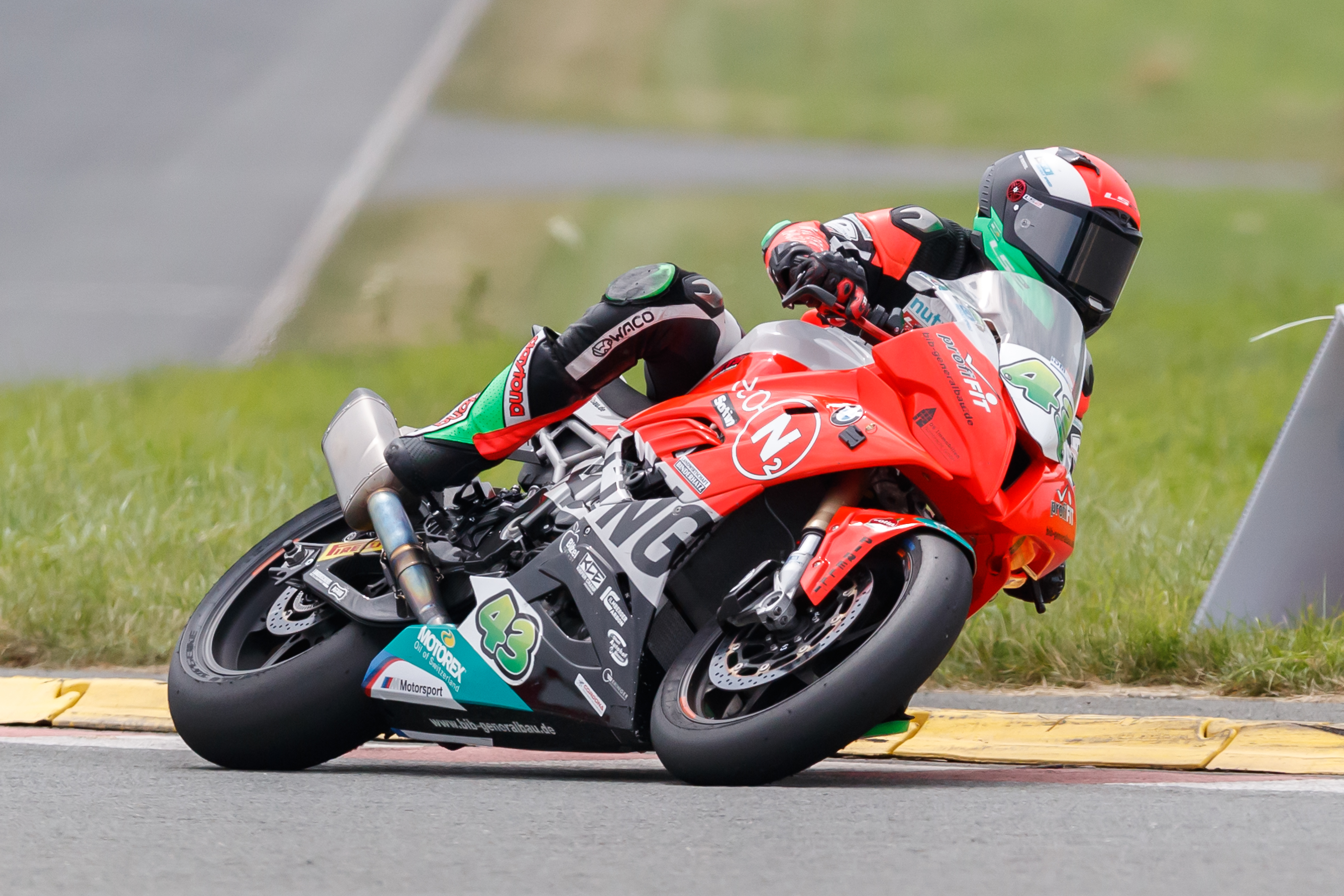
- 2021 at Schleizer Dreieck (Germany)
- Nationality: German
- Born: 10 November 1994 (age 32); Waldkraiburg, Germany
Motorcycle racing career statistics
Moto3 World Championship
Active years	2012–2014, 2018
Manufacturers	Honda, Kalex KTM
Championships	0
2018 championship position	41st (0 pts)
Starts / Wins / Podiums / Poles / F. laps / Points; 21 / 0 / 0 / 0 / 0 / 8
125cc World Championship
Active years	2011
Manufacturers	KTM
Championships	0
2011 championship position	NC (0 pts)
Starts / Wins / Podiums / Poles / F. laps / Points; 3 / 0 / 0 / 0 / 0 / 0
Supersport World Championship
Active years	2021
Manufacturers	Suzuki
Championships	0
2021 championship position	43rd (3 pts)
Starts / Wins / Podiums / Poles / F. laps / Points; 2 / 0 / 0 / 0 / 0 / 3
Supersport 300 World Championship
Active years	2018
Manufacturers	KTM
Championships	0
2018 championship position	4th (78 pts)
Starts / Wins / Podiums / Poles / F. laps / Points; 8 / 1 / 1 / 0 / 0 / 78

Luca Grünwald (born 10 November 1994) is a German motorcycle racer. At international level, he competed in the 125cc and Moto3 classes of Grand Prix motorcycle racing, the Supersport 300 World Championship and the Supersport World Championship. At national level, he competed in the ADAC Junior Cup (winning the series in 2007), the IDM 125GP Championship, the IDM Moto3 Championship where he won the titles in 2010 and 2012 respectively, the IDM Supersport Championship (where he was champion in 2020), the IDM Superstock 1000 Championship and the IDM Superbike Championship.

== Career statistics ==
=== FIM CEV Moto3 Championship ===
==== Races by year ====
(key) (Races in bold indicate pole position; races in italics indicate fastest lap)

Year	Bike	1	2	3	4	5	6	7	8	9	Pos	Pts
2013	KTM	CAT1	CAT2	ARA	ALB1	ALB2	NAV; 9	VAL1; 11	VAL1	JER	23rd	12

=== Grand Prix motorcycle racing ===
==== By season ====
Season	Class	Motorcycle	Team	Race	Win	Podium	Pole	FLap	Pts	Plcd
2011	125cc	KTM	Freudenberg Racing Team	3	0	0	0	0	0	NC
2012	Moto3	Honda	Freudenberg Racing Team	2	0	0	0	0	8	27th
2013	Moto3	Kalex KTM	Kiefer Racing	2	0	0	0	0	0	NC
2014	Moto3	Kalex KTM	Kiefer Racing	16	0	0	0	0	0	NC
2018	Moto3	KTM	Freudenberg Racing Team	1	0	0	0	0	0	41st
Total				**24**	**0**	**0**	**0**	**0**	**8**	

==== Races by year ====
(key) (Races in bold indicate pole position; races in italics indicate fastest lap)

Year	Class	Bike	1	2	3	4	5	6	7	8	9	10	11	12	13	14	15	16	17	18	19	Pos	Pts
2011	125cc	KTM	QAT	SPA	POR	FRA	CAT	GBR	NED; 18	ITA	GER; Ret	CZE; 18	INP	RSM	ARA	JPN	AUS	MAL	VAL			NC	0
2012	Moto3	Honda	QAT	SPA	POR	FRA	CAT	GBR	NED	GER; 8	ITA	INP	CZE; 19	RSM	ARA	JPN	MAL	AUS	VAL			27th	8
2013	Moto3	Kalex KTM	QAT	AME	SPA	FRA	ITA	CAT	NED	GER	INP	CZE	GBR	RSM	ARA	MAL	AUS; 22	JPN; Ret	VAL			NC	0
2014	Moto3	Kalex KTM	QAT; 22	AME; 23	ARG; Ret	SPA; 26	FRA; 18	ITA; 16	CAT; 20	NED; 28	GER; 19	INP; 19	CZE; Ret	GBR; DNS	RSM	ARA; 26	JPN; 21	AUS; 19	MAL; 16	VAL; 22		NC	0
2018	Moto3	KTM	QAT	ARG	AME	SPA	FRA	ITA	CAT	NED	GER; 20	CZE	AUT	GBR	RSM	ARA	THA	JPN	AUS	MAL	VAL	41st	0

=== Supersport 300 World Championship ===
==== Races by year ====
(key) (Races in bold indicate pole position; races in italics indicate fastest lap)

Year	Bike	1	2	3	4	5	6	7	8	Pos	Pts	Ref
2018	KTM	SPA; 9	NED; 1	ITA; 4	GBR; 10	CZE; 10	ITA; 5	POR; 29	FRA; 6	4th	78	

=== Supersport World Championship ===
==== Races by year ====
(key) (Races in bold indicate pole position; races in italics indicate fastest lap)

Year	Bike	1	2	3	4	5	6	7	8	9	10	11	12	13	14	15	16	17	18	19	20	21	22	23	24	Pos	Pts
2021	Suzuki	SPA	SPA	POR	POR	ITA	ITA	NED	NED	CZE; 18	CZE; 13	SPA	SPA	FRA	FRA	SPA	SPA	SPA	SPA	POR	POR	ARG	ARG	INA	INA	43rd	3
