= Federico Fuligni =

Italian motorcycle racer

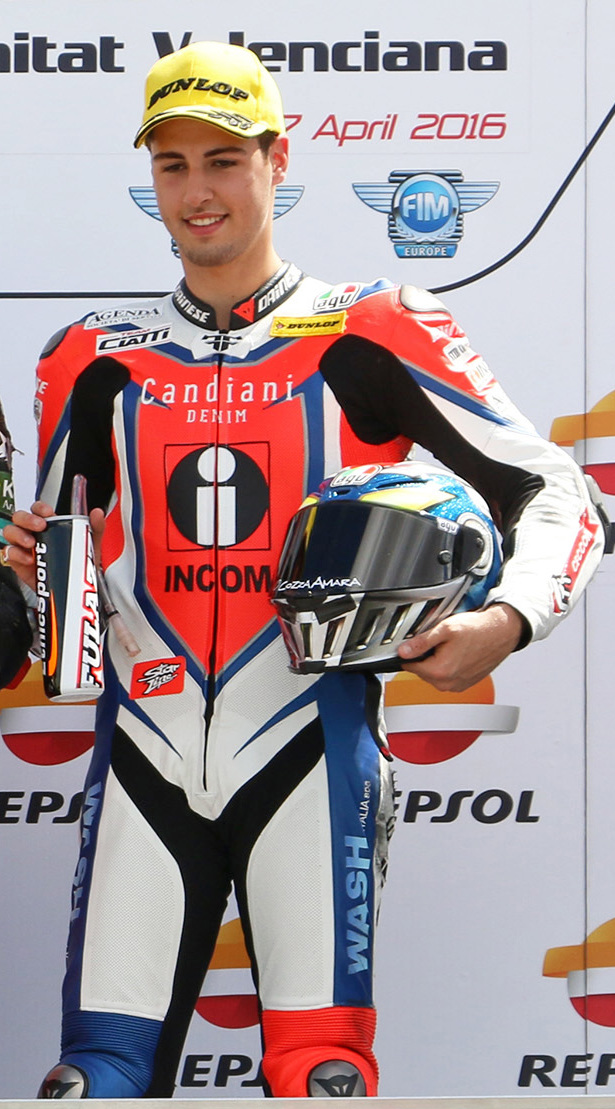
- Fuligni in 2016
- Nationality: Italian
- Born: 1 June 1995 (age 31); Bologna, Italy
- Current team: Kuja Racing
- Bike number: 42
Motorcycle racing career statistics
Moto2 World Championship
Active years	2014–2018
Manufacturers	Suter, Kalex
Championships	0
2018 championship position	36th (0 pts)
Starts / Wins / Podiums / Poles / F. laps / Points; 30 / 0 / 0 / 0 / 0 / 1
Supersport World Championship
Active years	2019–
Manufacturers	MV Agusta, Yamaha, Ducati
Championships	0
2025 championship position	44th (0 pts)
Starts / Wins / Podiums / Poles / F. laps / Points; 94 / 0 / 0 / 0 / 0 / 65

Federico Fuligni (born 1 June 1995) is an Italian motorcycle racer. In 2021, he raced in the Supersport World Championship aboard a Ducati Panigale V2.

Fuligni's younger brother Filippo is also a racer and now rider coach.

== Career ==
Born in Bologna, Fuligni appeared in selected Moto2 World Championship events as a wild card entry in 2014 and 2015 aboard a Suter MMX2 and in 2016 on a Kalex, achieving in the latter season a best result of 18th at Jerez and Misano.

From 2019, Fuligni competed in Supersport World Championship.

=== Magny-Cours crash incident ===
In 2019, Fuligni suffered a major accident in the FIM Supersport World Championship race at Magny-Cours. He was involved in a three-rider incident on Lap 1, which also involved crashes for Nacho Calero and Maximilien Bau. The race was immediately red-flagged.

Fuligni was taken to a medical center, and later transferred to Nevers Hospital, from where he was discharged five days later.

== Career statistics ==
=== Career highlights ===
- 2021 : Yamaha - RM Racing (CIV Supersport 600) #222

=== FIM CEV Moto2 European Championship ===
==== Races by year ====
(key) (Races in bold indicate pole position, races in italics indicate fastest lap)

Year	Bike	1	2	3	4	5	6	7	8	9	10	11	Pos	Pts
2014	Suter	JER; 10	ARA1; 13	ARA2; 8	CAT; 9	ALB; 5	NAV1; Ret	NAV2; 16	ALG1; Ret	ALG2; Ret	VAL		16th	35
2015	Suter	ALG1; DNS	ALG2; Ret	CAT; 9	ARA1; 4	ARA2; 4	ALB; 8	NAV1; Ret	NAV2; DNS	JER; 8	VAL1; 28	VAL2; 8	9th	57
2016	Kalex	VAL1; 4	VAL2; 3	ARA1	ARA2	CAT1	CAT2	ALB	ALG1; 14	ALG2; Ret	JER; Ret	VAL; 6	15th	41
2017	Kalex	ALB; 9	CAT1; 7	CAT2; 6	VAL1; 7	VAL2; 7	EST1; 6	EST2; 5	JER; 9	ARA1; 8	ARA2; 7	VAL; 5	7th	100

=== Grand Prix motorcycle racing ===
==== By season ====
Season	Class	Motorcycle	Team	Race	Win	Podium	Pole	FLap	Pts	Plcd
2014	Moto2	Suter	Ciatti	1	0	0	0	0	0	NC
2015	Moto2	Suter	Team Ciatti	2	0	0	0	0	0	NC
2016	Moto2	Kalex	Team Ciatti	4	0	0	0	0	0	33rd
2017	Moto2	Suter	Kiefer Racing	1	0	0	0	0	1	38th
2017	Moto2	Kalex	Forward Junior Team; Forward Racing Team	5	0	0	0	0	1	38th
2018	Moto2	Kalex	Tasca Racing Scuderia Moto2	17	0	0	0	0	0	36th
Total				**30**	**0**	**0**	**0**	**0**	**1**	

==== Races by year ====
(key) (Races in bold indicate pole position; races in italics indicate fastest lap)

Year	Class	Bike	1	2	3	4	5	6	7	8	9	10	11	12	13	14	15	16	17	18	19	Pos	Pts
2014	Moto2	Suter	QAT	AME	ARG	SPA	FRA	ITA	CAT	NED	GER	IND	CZE	GBR	RSM; 31	ARA	JPN	AUS	MAL	VAL		NC	0
2015	Moto2	Suter	QAT	AME	ARG	SPA	FRA	ITA	CAT	NED	GER	IND	CZE	GBR	RSM	ARA; Ret	JPN	AUS	MAL	VAL; 25		NC	0
2016	Moto2	Kalex	QAT	ARG	AME	SPA; 18	FRA	ITA; 20	CAT	NED	GER	AUT	CZE	GBR	RSM; 18	ARA	JPN	AUS	MAL	VAL; Ret		33rd	0
2017	Moto2	Suter	QAT	ARG	AME	SPA; 24	FRA															38th	1
2017	Moto2	Kalex						ITA; 28	CAT; 27	NED	GER; 24	CZE	AUT	GBR	RSM; 15	ARA; Ret	JPN	AUS	MAL	VAL		38th	1
2018	Moto2	Kalex	QAT; 29	ARG; 27	AME; 28	SPA; 21	FRA; Ret	ITA; 21	CAT; Ret	NED; 25	GER; 23	CZE	AUT; Ret	GBR; C	RSM; 24	ARA; Ret	THA; 25	JPN; Ret	AUS; Ret	MAL; 25	VAL; 19	36th	0

=== Supersport World Championship ===
==== Races by year ====
(key) (Races in bold indicate pole position; races in italics indicate fastest lap)

Year	Bike	1	2	3	4	5	6	7	8	9	10	11	12	Pos	Pts
2019	MV Agusta	AUS; Ret	THA; Ret	SPA; 13	NED; 15	ITA; 14	SPA; Ret	ITA; 11	GBR; 18	POR; 14	FRA; Ret	ARG	QAT	17th	13

Year	Bike	1		2		3		4		5		6		7		8		9		10		11		12		Pos	Pts
Year	Bike	R1	R2	R1	R2	R1	R2	R1	R2	R1	R2	R1	R2	R1	R2	R1	R2	R1	R2	R1	R2	R1	R2	R1	R2	Pos	Pts
2020	MV Agusta	AUS; DSQ		SPA; 13	SPA; 14	POR; Ret	POR; 16	SPA; 12	SPA; 12	SPA; 10	SPA; 14	SPA; 17	SPA; Ret	FRA; 8	FRA; Ret	POR; 13	POR; 17									18th	32
2021	Yamaha	SPA; Ret	SPA; 17	POR; Ret	POR; 16	ITA; 23	ITA; 21	NED; 17	NED; Ret	CZE; 15	CZE; 17	SPA; 20	SPA; 13	FRA; 16	FRA; 15	SPA; 25	SPA; 16	SPA; C	SPA; 14	POR; 17	POR; 16	ARG	ARG	INA	INA	35th	7
2022	Ducati	SPA; DNS	SPA; DNS	NED; 23	NED; 22	POR; 20	POR; Ret	ITA; 18	ITA; 23	GBR; 22	GBR; 21	CZE; 23	CZE; 26	FRA; 25	FRA; 21	SPA; 19	SPA; 17	POR; 24	POR; Ret	ARG	ARG	INA	INA	AUS	AUS	NC	0
2023	Ducati	AUS	AUS	INA	INA	NED; 17	NED; Ret	SPA; 23	SPA; 18	MIS; 15	MIS; 16	GBR; 19	GBR; 21	ITA; Ret	ITA; Ret	CZE; 23	CZE; 7	FRA; 25	FRA; Ret	SPA; 20	SPA; 19	POR; 21	POR; DNS	SPA	SPA	29th	10
2024	Ducati	AUS	AUS	SPA; Ret	SPA; 24	NED; DNQ	NED; DNQ	ITA; 13	ITA; 18	GBR; 24	GBR; DNS	CZE; 24	CZE; 22	POR; 20	POR; 21	FRA; 21	FRA; 23	ITA; 18	ITA; 19	SPA; 23	SPA; 23	POR; WD	POR; WD	SPA	SPA	35th	3
2025	Ducati	AUS	AUS	POR	POR	NED	NED	ITA; 21	ITA; 19	CZE	CZE	EMI	EMI	GBR	GBR	HUN	HUN	FRA	FRA	ARA	ARA	POR	POR	SPA	SPA	44th	0
