= Philipp Öttl =

German motorcycle racer

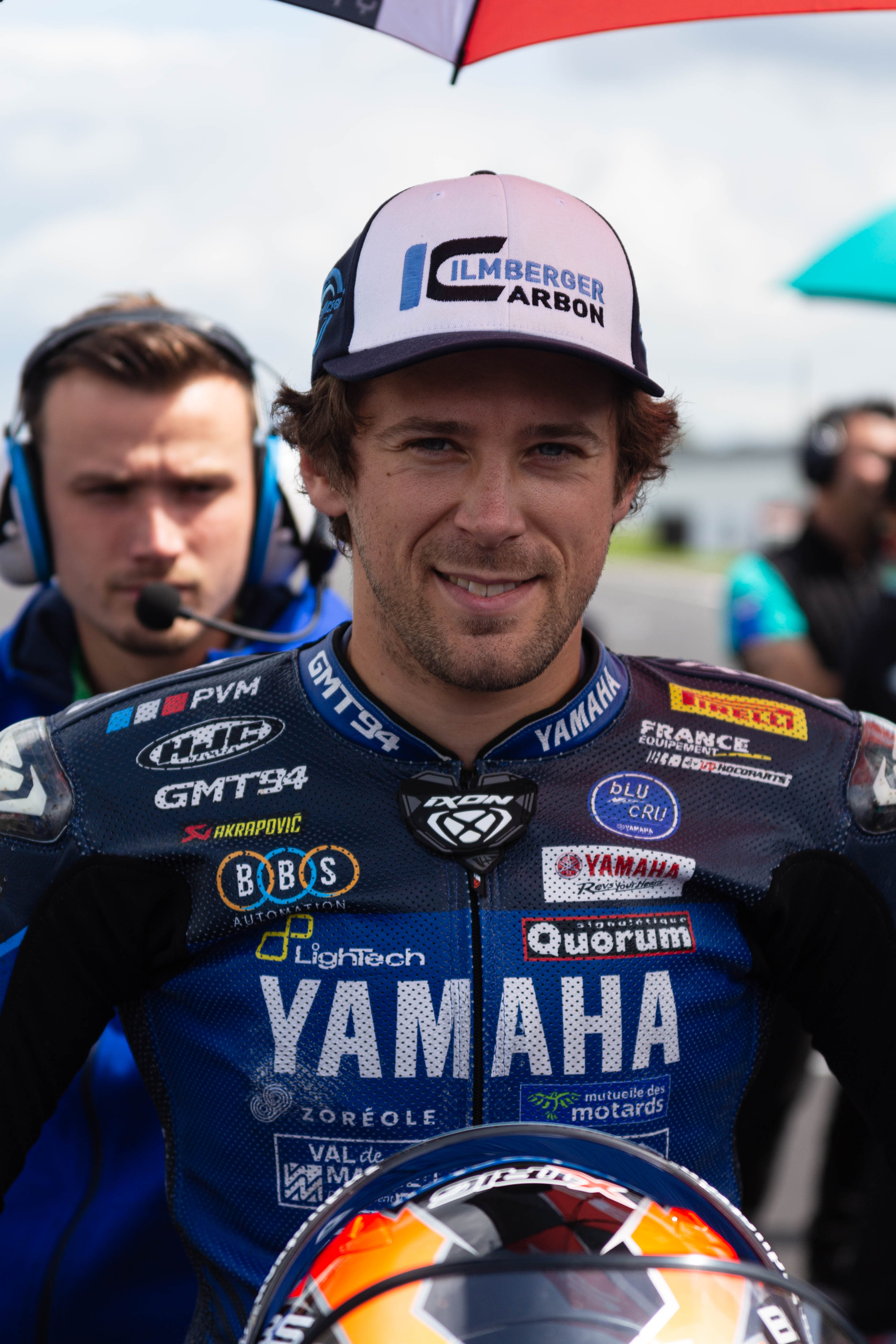
- Philipp Öttl, Donington World Superbike 2024
- Nationality: German
- Born: 3 May 1996 (age 30); Bad Reichenhall, Germany
- Current team: Feel Racing WorldSSP Team
- Bike number: 65
- Website: philippoettl.de
Motorcycle racing career statistics
Moto2 World Championship
Active years	2019
Manufacturers	KTM
Championships	0
2019 championship position	NC (0 pts)
Starts / Wins / Podiums / Poles / F. laps / Points; 16 / 0 / 0 / 0 / 0 / 0
Moto3 World Championship
Active years	2012–2018
Manufacturers	Kalex KTM, KTM
Championships	0
2018 championship position	16th (58 pts)
Starts / Wins / Podiums / Poles / F. laps / Points; 104 / 1 / 3 / 1 / 2 / 370
Superbike World Championship
Active years	2022-2024
Manufacturers	Ducati (2022-2023); Yamaha (2024)
2024 championship position	24th (5 pts)
Starts / Wins / Podiums / Poles / F. laps / Points; 103 / 0 / 0 / 0 / 0 / 214
Supersport World Championship
Active years	2020–2021, 2025–
Manufacturers	Kawasaki, Ducati
Championships	0
2025 championship position	6th (187 pts)
Starts / Wins / Podiums / Poles / F. laps / Points; 62 / 1 / 15 / 1 / 1 / 774

Philipp Öttl (born 3 May 1996 in Bad Reichenhall) is a German motorcycle racer who is living in Salzburg. He is the son of a former motorcycle racer, Peter Öttl.

Öttl is a former runner-up in the ADAC Junior Cup (2009), and has previously competed in the Red Bull MotoGP Rookies Cup, the German IDM 125GP Championship and the Spanish Moto3 Championship. He took his first Moto3 pole at the Circuit of the Americas on 9 April 2016.

Öttl took part in the 2021 CIV Supersport 600 Championship as a wildcard entry at Mugello.

== Career statistics ==
=== Career highlights ===
- 2021 : Kawasaki Puccetti Racing (CIV Supersport 600) #5

=== Red Bull MotoGP Rookies Cup ===
==== Races by year ====
(key) (Races in bold indicate pole position, races in italics indicate fastest lap)

Year	1	2	3	4	5	6	7	8	9	10	11	12	13	14	15	Pos	Pts
2010	SPA1; 16	SPA2; 16	ITA; 10	NED1; 13	NED2; 12	GER1; 19	GER2; 11	CZE1; 16	CZE2; 12	RSM; 16						19th	22
2011	SPA1; 1	SPA2; 2	POR1	POR2	GBR1; 17	GBR2; Ret	NED1; 7	NED2; 9	ITA; 5	**GER1**; 1	**GER2**; 6	CZE1; 9	CZE2; 9	RSM; 2		4th	141
2012	SPA1; 6	SPA2; 4	POR1; 8	POR2; 2	GBR1; 4	GBR2; 1	NED1; 2	NED2; 3	GER1; 7	GER2; Ret	CZE1; 10	CZE2; DNS	RSM; 8	ARA1; NC	ARA2; 5	4th	159

=== CEV Moto3 Championship ===
==== Races by year ====
(key) (Races in bold indicate pole position, races in italics indicate fastest lap)

Year	Bike	1	2	3	4	5	6	7	Pos	Pts
2012	Kalex KTM	**JER**; 1	NAV; 8	ARA; 7	CAT; 8	ALB1; 9	ALB2; Ret	VAL; 4	4th	70

=== Grand Prix motorcycle racing ===
==== By season ====
Season	Class	Motorcycle	Team	Race	Win	Podium	Pole	FLap	Pts	Plcd
2012	Moto3	Kalex KTM	HP Moto Kalex	1	0	0	0	0	5	31st
2013	Moto3	Kalex KTM	Paddock TT Motion Events; Tec Interwetten Moto3 Racing; Interwetten Paddock Moto3	16	0	0	0	1	34	18th
2014	Moto3	Kalex KTM	Interwetten Paddock Moto3	18	0	0	0	0	10	24th
2015	Moto3	KTM	Schedl GP Racing	18	0	1	0	0	73	15th
2016	Moto3	KTM	Schedl GP Racing	17	0	0	1	1	85	12th
2017	Moto3	KTM	Südmetall Schedl GP Racing	17	0	1	0	0	105	10th
2018	Moto3	KTM	Südmetall Schedl GP Racing	17	1	1	0	0	58	16th
2019	Moto2	KTM	Red Bull KTM Tech3	16	0	0	0	0	0	33rd
Total				**120**	**1**	**3**	**1**	**2**	**370**	

==== Races by year ====
(key) (Races in bold indicate pole position; races in italics indicate fastest lap)

Year	Class	Bike	1	2	3	4	5	6	7	8	9	10	11	12	13	14	15	16	17	18	19	Pos	Pts
2012	Moto3	Kalex KTM	QAT	SPA	POR	FRA	CAT	GBR	NED	GER	ITA	INP	CZE	RSM	ARA	JPN	MAL	AUS	VAL; 11			31st	5
2013	Moto3	Kalex KTM	QAT; 17	AME; 17	SPA; 20	FRA; 15	ITA; 19	CAT; 18	NED; 22	GER; 17	INP; 19	CZE; 17	GBR; 16	RSM; 9	ARA; 6	MAL; 10	AUS; DNS	JPN; 13	VAL; 9			18th	34
2014	Moto3	Kalex KTM	QAT; 20	AME; 20	ARG; 21	SPA; 15	FRA; 15	ITA; 13	CAT; 19	NED; 15	GER; 12	INP; 20	CZE; 24	GBR; 17	RSM; 19	ARA; Ret	JPN; 17	AUS; 21	MAL; 18	VAL; Ret		24th	10
2015	Moto3	KTM	QAT; 14	AME; 13	ARG; 16	SPA; Ret	FRA; 10	ITA; 22	CAT; 10	NED; 15	GER; 11	INP; 3	CZE; 15	GBR; 16	RSM; 10	ARA; 5	JPN; 23	AUS; 7	MAL; 15	VAL; 10		15th	73
2016	Moto3	KTM	QAT; 9	ARG; 15	**AME**; 4	SPA; 10	FRA; Ret	ITA	CAT; 17	NED; 11	GER; 17	AUT; 5	CZE; 15	GBR; 12	RSM; 8	ARA; 10	JPN; 4	AUS; 14	MAL; Ret	VAL; 8		12th	85
2017	Moto3	KTM	QAT; Ret	ARG; 4	AME; 9	SPA; DNS	FRA; 21	ITA; 14	CAT; 13	NED; 11	GER; 5	CZE; 13	AUT; 2	GBR; 9	RSM; 4	ARA; 9	JPN; 6	AUS; 13	MAL; 16	VAL; 15		10th	105
2018	Moto3	KTM	QAT; Ret	ARG; 23	AME; 6	SPA; 1	FRA; 15	ITA; 19	CAT; 16	NED; 18	GER; 8	CZE; 8	AUT; 14	GBR; C	RSM; DNS	ARA; 19	THA; 13	JPN; 16	AUS; 15	MAL; 19	VAL; Ret	16th	58
2019	Moto2	KTM	QAT; 23	ARG; 19	AME; 18	SPA; 23	FRA; 19	ITA; 21	CAT; DNS	NED; DNS	GER	CZE; 23	AUT; 22	GBR; 24	RSM; 23	ARA; 26	THA; 22	JPN; 20	AUS; 22	MAL; 21	VAL; 26	33rd	0

=== Supersport World Championship ===
==== Races by year ====
(key) (Races in bold indicate pole position, races in italics indicate fastest lap)

Year	Bike	1		2		3		4		5		6		7		8		9		10		11		12		Pos	Pts
Year	Bike	R1	R2	R1	R2	R1	R2	R1	R2	R1	R2	R1	R2	R1	R2	R1	R2	R1	R2	R1	R2	R1	R2	R1	R2	Pos	Pts
2020	Kawasaki	AUS; Ret		SPA; 3	SPA; 4	POR; 7	POR; 5	SPA; 3	SPA; 5	SPA; 5	SPA; 4	SPA; 8	SPA; 3	FRA; 14	FRA; 11	POR; 2	POR; 5									3rd	162
2021	Kawasaki	SPA; 3	SPA; Ret	POR; 2	POR; 3	ITA; 6	ITA; 6	NED; 3	NED; 2	CZE; 3	CZE; 4	SPA; 7	SPA; 6	FRA; 7	FRA; 4	SPA; 5	SPA; 8	SPA; C	**SPA**; 2	POR; 9	POR; 8	ARG; 11	ARG; 12	INA; 12	INA; 9	5th	252
2025	Ducati	AUS	AUS	POR; 11	POR; 10	NED; 7	NED; 13	ITA; 15	ITA; Ret	CZE; 7	CZE; 3	EMI; 10	EMI; 4	GBR; 6	GBR; 6	HUN; 9	HUN; Ret	FRA; 9	FRA; 8	ARA; 4	ARA; 4	EST; 4	EST; 2	SPA; 8	SPA; 6	6th	187
2026	Ducati	AUS; 2	AUS; 11	POR; 6	POR; 6	NED; 7	NED; 1	HUN; 6	HUN; NC	CZE; 9	CZE; 7	ARA; 10	ARA; 6	EMI; NC	EMI; 15	GBR; 6	GBR; 9	FRA; 28	FRA; 19	ITA; 11	ITA; 7	EST; 10	EST; 6	SPA; 16	SPA; 12	8th	173

=== Superbike World Championship ===
==== By season ====
Season	Motorcycle	Team	Number	Race	Win	Podium	Pole	FLap	Pts	Plcd
2022	Ducati Panigale V4 R	Team GoEleven	5	32	0	0	0	0	85	13th
2023	Ducati Panigale V4 R	Team GoEleven	5	36	0	0	0	0	124	15th
2024	Yamaha YZF-R1	Yamaha Motoxracing WorldSBK Team	5	35	0	0	0	0	5	24th
Total				**103**	**0**	**0**	**0**	**0**	**214**	

==== Races by year ====
(key) (Races in bold indicate pole position) (Races in italics indicate fastest lap)

Year	Bike	1			2			3			4			5			6			7			8			9			10			11			12			Pos	Pts
Year	Bike	R1	SR	R2	R1	SR	R2	R1	SR	R2	R1	SR	R2	R1	SR	R2	R1	SR	R2	R1	SR	R2	R1	SR	R2	R1	SR	R2	R1	SR	R2	R1	SR	R2	R1	SR	R2	Pos	Pts
2022	Ducati	SPA; 13	SPA; 16	SPA; 13	NED; 7	NED; 10	NED; Ret	POR; WD	POR; WD	POR; WD	ITA; Ret	ITA; Ret	ITA; 11	GBR; 11	GBR; 11	GBR; 12	CZE; 13	CZE; 13	CZE; 8	FRA; 8	FRA; 12	FRA; 11	SPA; Ret	SPA; 6	SPA; 7	POR; 12	POR; 11	POR; 11	ARG; 17	ARG; 15	ARG; 14	INA; Ret	INA; 14	INA; DNS	AUS; 20	AUS; 16	AUS; 8	13th	85
2023	Ducati	AUS; 11	AUS; 6	AUS; 5	INA; 13	INA; 13	INA; Ret	NED; 14	NED; 14	NED; 11	SPA; 11	SPA; 13	SPA; 14	EMI; 14	EMI; 10	EMI; 9	GBR; Ret	GBR; 10	GBR; 10	ITA; Ret	ITA; 12	ITA; 15	CZE; Ret	CZE; 21	CZE; 13	FRA; 9	FRA; 10	FRA; 10	SPA; 6	SPA; 8	SPA; 7	POR; 11	POR; 10	POR; 9	SPA; 6	SPA; 7	SPA; 7	15th	124
2024	Yamaha	AUS; 16	AUS; 18	AUS; 14	SPA; 19	SPA; 19	SPA; 16	NED; 18	NED; 19	NED; 14	ITA; 17	ITA; 19	ITA; 15	GBR; 18	GBR; 20	GBR; 20	CZE; 18	CZE; 17	CZE; Ret	POR; DSQ	POR; 21	POR; 21	FRA; Ret	FRA; 14	FRA; 16	ITA; 16	ITA; 19	ITA; 17	SPA; 17	SPA; 18	SPA; 19	POR; 17	POR; 21	POR; 16	SPA; 18	SPA; 22	SPA; Ret	24th	5
