= Niki Tuuli =

Finnish motorcycle racer (born 1995)

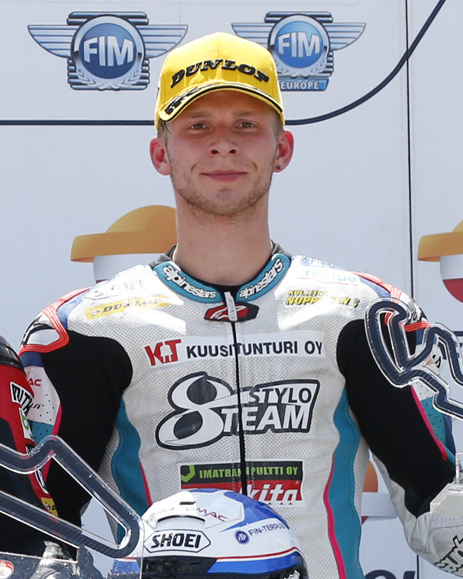
- Tuuli in 2019
- Nationality: Finnish
- Born: 26 October 1995 (age 31); Imatra, Finland
- Current team: QJMotor Factory Racing
- Bike number: 66
Motorcycle racing career statistics
Moto2 World Championship
Active years	2018
Manufacturers	Kalex
Championships	0
2018 championship position	32nd (1 pt)
Starts / Wins / Podiums / Poles / F. laps / Points; 11 / 0 / 0 / 0 / 0 / 1
MotoE World Championship
Active years	2019–2020
Manufacturers	Energica
Championships	0
2020 championship position	6th (53 pts)
Starts / Wins / Podiums / Poles / F. laps / Points; 9 / 2 / 3 / 1 / 3 / 79
Supersport World Championship
Active years	2015–2018, 2021–2025
Manufacturers	Yamaha, Honda, MV Agusta, Triumph, Ducati, QJ Motor
Championships	0
2025 championship position	27th (11 pts)
Starts / Wins / Podiums / Poles / F. laps / Points; 125 / 3 / 12 / 3 / 5 / 770

Niki Rikhard Tuuli (born 26 October 1995) is a Finnish former Grand Prix motorcycle racer. He most recently competed in the Supersport World Championship for QJMotor Factory Racing. In 2012, Tuuli won the Yamaha R6 Dunlop Cup.

== Career ==
Between 2013 and 2015, Tuuli competed in the Superstock 600 series before moving up to the Supersport World Championship as a full-time rider in 2017. He competed as a wild-card entry in 2016 scoring podiums in all three races he participated.

After Zulfahmi Khairuddin retired from the sport, Tuuli replaced him in the SIC Racing Team to join the 2018 Moto2 World Championship.

In 2025, Tuuli competed for the QJMotor Factory Racing in Supersport World Championship.

== Career statistics ==
- 2021: MV Agusta Corse Clienti (CIV Supersport 600) #66

=== FIM European Superstock 600 ===
==== Races by year ====
(key) (Races in bold indicate pole position, races in italics indicate fastest lap)

Year	Bike	1	2	3	4	5	6	7	8	9	10	Pos	Pts
2013	Yamaha	ARA; 12	ASS; DNS	MNZ; 4	POR	IMO; Ret	SIL1; 10	SIL2; 19	NÜR; 5	MAG; Ret	JER; 14	14th	36
2014	Yamaha	SPA; 4	NED; 1	IMO; 2	ITA; Ret	POR; Ret	SPA; Ret	FRA; 3				4th	74
2015	Yamaha	SPA; 5	SPA; 5	NED; 3	IMO; Ret	POR; 7	ITA; 2	SPA; 5	FRA; Ret			5th	78

=== Supersport World Championship ===
==== Races by year ====
(key) (Races in bold indicate pole position; races in italics indicate fastest lap)

Year	Bike	1	2	3	4	5	6	7	8	9	10	11	12	Pos	Pts
2015	Yamaha	AUS	THA	SPA	NED	ITA	GBR; 9	POR	ITA	MAL	SPA	FRA	QAT	26th	7
2016	Yamaha	AUS	THA	SPA	NED	ITA	MAL	GBR	ITA	GER; 2	FRA; 2	SPA; 2	QAT	10th	60
2017	Yamaha	AUS; 5	THA; 3	SPA; Ret	NED; 16	ITA; Ret	GBR; 24	ITA; Ret	GER; 5	POR; Ret	**FRA**; 1	SPA; 7	QAT; 6	7th	82
2018	Honda	AUS; 11	THA; 9	SPA; 8	NED; 7	ITA; 7	GBR	CZE	ITA	POR	FRA	ARG	QAT	14th	38

Year	Bike	1		2		3		4		5		6		7		8		9		10		11		12		Pos	Pts
Year	Bike	R1	R2	R1	R2	R1	R2	R1	R2	R1	R2	R1	R2	R1	R2	R1	R2	R1	R2	R1	R2	R1	R2	R1	R2	Pos	Pts
2021	MV Agusta	ARA; Ret	ARA; DNS	POR; 11	POR; 8	EMI; 9	EMI; Ret	NED; Ret	NED; 8	CZE; 9	CZE; 8	NAV; 10	NAV; 7	FRA; Ret	FRA; 5	CAT; 19	CAT; 3	SPA; C	SPA; 3	POR; 5	POR; Ret	ARG; 8	ARG; Ret	IDN; Ret	IDN; 2	11th	140
2022	MV Agusta	ARA; 6	ARA; 5	NED; 6	NED; 7	POR; Ret	POR; DNS	EMI	EMI	GBR	GBr	CZE; 6	CZE; 10	FRA; 6	FRA; 11	SPA; 6	SPA; 5	POR; 5	POR; Ret	ARG; 5	ARG; 4	**IDN**; 1	**IDN**; Ret	AUS; Ret	AUS; Ret	8th	152
2023	Triumph	AUS; 4	AUS; 9	IDN; 3	IDN; 6	NED; 12	NED; 5	CAT; 10	CAT; 8	EMI; 9	EMI; 10	GBR; 15	GBR; 12	ITA; Ret	ITA; DNS	CZE; 7	CZE; 9	FRA; 5	FRA; 5	ARA; 9	ARA; Ret	POR; 9	POR; 10	SPA; 9	SPA; 12	8th	162
2024	Ducati	AUS; 17	AUS; 14	CAT; 16	CAT; NC	NED; Ret	NED; 3	EMI; 9	EMI; 8	GBR; 9	GBR; 6	CZE; 10	CZE; 8	POR; 10	POR; Ret	FRA; 1	FRA; 8	ITA; 9	ITA; 10	ARA; 14	ARA; 16	EST; Ret	EST; DNS	SPA	SPA	11th	118
2025	QJ Motor	AUS	AUS	POR; 23	POR; 20	NED; 20	NED; 22	ITA; DNS	ITA; DNS	CZE; Ret	CZE; DNS	EMI; 22	EMI; 18	GBR; 18	GBR; Ret	HUN; 18	HUN; 18	FRA; Ret	FRA; 12	ARA; 29	ARA; 12	EST; 20	EST; 18	SPA; 18	SPA; 13	27th	11

=== Grand Prix motorcycle racing ===
==== By season ====
Season	Class	Motorcycle	Team	Race	Win	Podium	Pole	FLap	Pts	Plcd
2018	Moto2	Kalex	SIC Racing Team; Petronas Sprinta Racing	11	0	0	0	0	1	32nd
2019	MotoE	Energica	Ajo MotoE	3	1	1	1	1	26	15th
2020	MotoE	Energica	Avant Ajo MotoE	6	1	2	0	2	53	6th
Total				**20**	**2**	**3**	**1**	**3**	**80**	

==== By class ====
Class	Seasons	1st GP	1st pod	1st win	Race	Win	Podiums	Pole	FLap	Pts	WChmp
Moto2	2018	2018 France			11	0	0	0	0	1	0
MotoE	2019–2020	2019 Germany	2019 Germany	2019 Germany	9	2	3	1	3	79	0
Total	2018–2020				**20**	**2**	**3**	**1**	**3**	**80**	**0**

==== Races by year ====
(key) (Races in bold indicate pole position; races in italics indicate fastest lap)

Year	Class	Bike	1	2	3	4	5	6	7	8	9	10	11	12	13	14	15	16	17	18	19	Pos	Pts
2018	Moto2	Kalex	QAT	ARG	AME	SPA	FRA; 22	ITA; 17	CAT; Ret	NED; DNS	GER; DNS	CZE; 21	AUT; 21	GBR; C	RSM; 21	ARA; 22	THA; 15	JPN; 21	AUS; DNS	MAL; Ret	VAL; Ret	32nd	1
2019	MotoE	Energica	**GER**; 1	AUT; 15	RSM1; Ret	RSM2; DNS	VAL1	VAL2														15th	26
2020	MotoE	Energica	SPA; 11	ANC; DNS	RSM; 17	EMI1; 13	EMI2; 12	FRA1; 3	FRA2; 1													6th	53

=== FIM CEV Moto2 European Championship ===
==== Races by year ====
(key) (Races in bold indicate pole position; races in italics indicate fastest lap)

Year	Bike	1	2	3	4	5	6	7	8	9	10	11	Pos	Pts
2019	Kalex	EST1; 1	EST2; 2	VAL; DNS	CAT1; 4	CAT2; 2	ARA1; 9	ARA2; 3	JER	ALB1	ALB2	VAL	5th	101
2020	Kalex	**EST1**; 2	EST2; 2	POR1; 2	POR2; 2	JER1; 3	JER2; 2	ARA1; 3	ARA2; 2	ARA3; 2	**VAL1**; 5	**VAL2**; 4	2nd	196
