= 2021 Supersport World Championship =

25th season of the Supersport World Championship

2021 Supersport World Championship
Previous:	2020	Next:	2022
Support series: Superbike World Championship; Supersport 300 World Championship

The 2021 Supersport World Championship was the 25th season of the Supersport World Championship, the twenty-third held under this name. The championship was won by Dominique Aegerter.

== Race calendar and results ==
2021 calendar
Round		Country	Circuit	Date	Superpole	Fastest lap	Winning rider	Winning team	Winning constructor
1	R1	Spain	MotorLand Aragón	22 May	(France) Jules Cluzel	(Finland) Niki Tuuli	(South Africa) Steven Odendaal	Evan Bros. WorldSSP Team	(Japan) Yamaha
1	R2	Spain	MotorLand Aragón	23 May	(France) Jules Cluzel	(Italy) Raffaele De Rosa	(South Africa) Steven Odendaal	Evan Bros. WorldSSP Team	(Japan) Yamaha
2	R1	Portugal	Circuito do Estoril	29 May (Note: The Estoril round was originally due to take place on 7–9 May 2021. It was firstly postponed indefinitely in response to the COVID-19 pandemic, then it was rescheduled to 28-30 May 2021.)	(Italy) Federico Caricasulo	(Finland) Niki Tuuli	(South Africa) Steven Odendaal	Evan Bros. WorldSSP Team	(Japan) Yamaha
2	R2	Portugal	Circuito do Estoril	30 May	(Italy) Federico Caricasulo	(Italy) Raffaele De Rosa	(Switzerland) Dominique Aegerter	Ten Kate Racing Yamaha	(Japan) Yamaha
3	R1	Italy	Misano World Circuit Marco Simoncelli	12 June	(Switzerland) Dominique Aegerter	(Switzerland) Dominique Aegerter	(Switzerland) Dominique Aegerter	Ten Kate Racing Yamaha	(Japan) Yamaha
3	R2	Italy	Misano World Circuit Marco Simoncelli	13 June	(Switzerland) Dominique Aegerter	(Spain) Manuel González	(Switzerland) Dominique Aegerter	Ten Kate Racing Yamaha	(Japan) Yamaha
4	R1	Netherlands	TT Circuit Assen	24 July (Note: The Assen round was originally due to take place on 23–25 April 2021. It was postponed to 23–25 July in response to the COVID-19 pandemic.)	(Switzerland) Dominique Aegerter	(Switzerland) Dominique Aegerter	(Switzerland) Dominique Aegerter	Ten Kate Racing Yamaha	(Japan) Yamaha
4	R2	Netherlands	TT Circuit Assen	25 July	(Switzerland) Dominique Aegerter	(Switzerland) Dominique Aegerter	(Switzerland) Dominique Aegerter	Ten Kate Racing Yamaha	(Japan) Yamaha
5	R1	Czech Republic	Autodrom Most	7 August (Note: The Most round was not originally in the 2021 calendar; it was added into the calendar on the date of 29 April 2021 instead of Phillip Island round.)	(Spain) Manuel González	(Spain) Manuel González	(South Africa) Steven Odendaal	Evan Bros. WorldSSP Team	(Japan) Yamaha
5	R2	Czech Republic	Autodrom Most	8 August	(Spain) Manuel González	(South Africa) Steven Odendaal	(Switzerland) Dominique Aegerter	Ten Kate Racing Yamaha	(Japan) Yamaha
6	R1	Spain	Circuito de Navarra	21 August (Note: The Navarra round was not originally part of the calendar; it was added to the schedule on 9 March 2021.)	(Switzerland) Dominique Aegerter	(Switzerland) Dominique Aegerter	(Switzerland) Dominique Aegerter	Ten Kate Racing Yamaha	(Japan) Yamaha
6	R2	Spain	Circuito de Navarra	22 August	(Switzerland) Dominique Aegerter	(Switzerland) Dominique Aegerter	(Switzerland) Dominique Aegerter	Ten Kate Racing Yamaha	(Japan) Yamaha
7	R1	France	Circuit de Nevers Magny-Cours	4 September	(San Marino) Luca Bernardi	(Switzerland) Dominique Aegerter	(Switzerland) Dominique Aegerter	Ten Kate Racing Yamaha	(Japan) Yamaha
7	R2	France	Circuit de Nevers Magny-Cours	5 September	(San Marino) Luca Bernardi	(Spain) Manuel González	(Spain) Manuel González	Yamaha ParkinGO Team	(Japan) Yamaha
8	R1	Spain	Circuit de Barcelona-Catalunya	18 September	(Spain) Manuel González	(Italy) Michel Fabrizio	(Switzerland) Randy Krummenacher	CM Racing	(Japan) Yamaha
8	R2	Spain	Circuit de Barcelona-Catalunya	19 September	(Spain) Manuel González	(Turkey) Can Öncü	(Spain) Manuel González	Yamaha ParkinGO Team	(Japan) Yamaha
9	R1	Spain	Circuito de Jerez	25 September	(Germany) Philipp Öttl	Race cancelled (Note: Race cancelled following the death of Dean Berta Viñales in the supporting Supersport 300 World Championship race.)			
9	R2	Spain	Circuito de Jerez	26 September	(Germany) Philipp Öttl	(Switzerland) Dominique Aegerter	(Switzerland) Dominique Aegerter	Ten Kate Racing Yamaha	(Japan) Yamaha
10	R1	Portugal	Algarve International Circuit	2 October	(France) Jules Cluzel	(France) Jules Cluzel	(France) Jules Cluzel	GMT94 Yamaha	(Japan) Yamaha
10	R2	Portugal	Algarve International Circuit	3 October	(France) Jules Cluzel	(Italy) Federico Caricasulo	(South Africa) Steven Odendaal	Evan Bros. WorldSSP Team	(Japan) Yamaha
11	R1	Argentina	Circuito San Juan Villicum	16 October	(France) Jules Cluzel	(France) Jules Cluzel	(France) Jules Cluzel	GMT94 Yamaha	(Japan) Yamaha
11	R2	Argentina	Circuito San Juan Villicum	17 October	(France) Jules Cluzel	(France) Jules Cluzel	(France) Jules Cluzel	GMT94 Yamaha	(Japan) Yamaha
12	R1	Indonesia	Pertamina Mandalika International Street Circuit	20 November (Note: The Mandalika round was originally due to take place on 12-14 November 2021. It was postponed to 19–21 November 2021.)	(Switzerland) Dominique Aegerter	(Switzerland) Dominique Aegerter	(Italy) Raffaele De Rosa	Orelac Racing VerdNatura	(Japan) Kawasaki
12	R2	Indonesia	Pertamina Mandalika International Street Circuit	21 November	(Switzerland) Dominique Aegerter	(France) Jules Cluzel	(France) Jules Cluzel	GMT94 Yamaha	(Japan) Yamaha

== Entry list ==
2021 entry list
Team	Constructor	Motorcycle	No.	Rider	Class	Rounds
Chiodo Moto Racing	Yamaha	YZF-R6	2	(Italy) Luigi Montella	C	1–10
Orelac Racing VerdNatura	Kawasaki	ZX-6R	3	(Italy) Raffaele De Rosa		All
Orelac Racing VerdNatura	Kawasaki	ZX-6R	24	(Italy) Leonardo Taccini	C	1–10
Evan Bros. WorldSSP Yamaha Team	Yamaha	YZF-R6	4	(South Africa) Steven Odendaal		All
Evan Bros. WorldSSP Yamaha Team	Yamaha	YZF-R6	56	(Hungary) Péter Sebestyén		4–12
Kawasaki Puccetti Racing	Kawasaki	ZX-6R	5	(Germany) Philipp Öttl		All
Kawasaki Puccetti Racing	Kawasaki	ZX-6R	54	(Turkey) Kenan Sofuoğlu		9
Kawasaki Puccetti Racing	Kawasaki	ZX-6R	61	(Turkey) Can Öncü		All
Biblion Iberica Yamaha Motoxracing	Yamaha	YZF-R6	6	(Spain) María Herrera	C	1–4, 6–7, 9–10
Biblion Iberica Yamaha Motoxracing	Yamaha	YZF-R6	88	(Italy) Matteo Patacca		8
Biblion Iberica Yamaha Motoxracing	Yamaha	YZF-R6	94	(Italy) Federico Caricasulo	C	5, 8
Biblion Iberica Yamaha Motoxracing	Yamaha	YZF-R6	94	(Italy) Federico Caricasulo		6–7, 9–10
VFT Racing	Yamaha	YZF-R6	7	(Italy) Mattia Casadei		4
VFT Racing	Yamaha	YZF-R6	22	(Italy) Federico Fuligni		1–10
VFT Racing	Yamaha	YZF-R6	23	(Italy) Davide Pizzoli		1–3
VFT Racing	Yamaha	YZF-R6	25	(Switzerland) Marcel Brenner		5–11
VFT Racing	Yamaha	YZF-R6	74	(Argentina) Andrés González		11–12
VFT Racing	Yamaha	YZF-R6	94	(Italy) Federico Caricasulo		12
Kallio Racing	Yamaha	YZF-R6	9	(Denmark) Simon Jespersen		6
Kallio Racing	Yamaha	YZF-R6	38	(Estonia) Hannes Soomer		1–4, 7–12
Kallio Racing	Yamaha	YZF-R6	51	(Germany) Max Enderlein		5
Kallio Racing	Yamaha	YZF-R6	95	(Finland) Vertti Takala		All
Ten Kate Racing Yamaha	Yamaha	YZF-R6	9	(Denmark) Simon Jespersen		8
Ten Kate Racing Yamaha	Yamaha	YZF-R6	24	(Italy) Leonardo Taccini		11
Ten Kate Racing Yamaha	Yamaha	YZF-R6	55	(Indonesia) Galang Hendra Pratama		1–10, 12
Ten Kate Racing Yamaha	Yamaha	YZF-R6	77	(Switzerland) Dominique Aegerter		1–7, 9–12
Maco Racing	Yamaha	YZF-R6	10	(Czech Republic) Jiří Mrkývka		5
RM Racing	Kawasaki	ZX-6R	11	(Italy) Luca Ottaviani		3
G.A.P. Motozoo Racing by Puccetti	Kawasaki	ZX-6R	11	(Italy) Luca Ottaviani	C	5
G.A.P. Motozoo Racing by Puccetti	Kawasaki	ZX-6R	45	(Japan) Shogo Kawasaki	C	1–4, 8–9
G.A.P. Motozoo Racing by Puccetti	Kawasaki	ZX-6R	45	(Japan) Shogo Kawasaki		10
G.A.P. Motozoo Racing by Puccetti	Kawasaki	ZX-6R	64	(Netherlands) Jeffrey Buis		11–12
G.A.P. Motozoo Racing by Puccetti	Kawasaki	ZX-6R	78	(Japan) Hikari Okubo	C	6–7
G.A.P. Motozoo Racing by Puccetti	Kawasaki	ZX-6R	82	(Portugal) Pedro Nuno	C	10
G.A.P. Motozoo Racing by Puccetti	Kawasaki	ZX-6R	84	(Italy) Michel Fabrizio		1–9
D34G Racing	Yamaha	YZF-R6	12	(Italy) Filippo Fuligni		3
GMT94 Yamaha	Yamaha	YZF-R6	14	(France) Ludovic Cauchi		8
GMT94 Yamaha	Yamaha	YZF-R6	16	(France) Jules Cluzel		1–7, 9–12
GMT94 Yamaha	Yamaha	YZF-R6	30	(France) Andy Verdoïa		7–8
GMT94 Yamaha	Yamaha	YZF-R6	31	(Spain) Daniel Valle		6
GMT94 Yamaha	Yamaha	YZF-R6	52	(Germany) Patrick Hobelsberger		5
GMT94 Yamaha	Yamaha	YZF-R6	53	(France) Valentin Debise		5, 11–12
GMT94 Yamaha	Yamaha	YZF-R6	53	(France) Valentin Debise		7
GMT94 Yamaha	Yamaha	YZF-R6	62	(Italy) Stefano Manzi		9
GMT94 Yamaha	Yamaha	YZF-R6	91	(Italy) Yari Montella		10
GMT94 Yamaha	Yamaha	YZF-R6	94	(Italy) Federico Caricasulo		1–4
WRP Wepol Racing	Yamaha	YZF-R6	15	(Republic of Ireland) Eugene McManus		2–3
WRP Wepol Racing	Yamaha	YZF-R6	96	(Spain) David Sanchis		6–10
WRP Wepol Racing	Yamaha	YZF-R6	99	(United Kingdom) Danny Webb		1, 4–5
Yamaha MS Racing	Yamaha	YZF-R6	17	(Spain) Óscar Gutiérrez		6
Yamaha MS Racing	Yamaha	YZF-R6	19	(Poland) Paweł Szkopek		1–5
Yamaha MS Racing	Yamaha	YZF-R6	31	(Spain) Daniel Valle		7, 12
Yamaha MS Racing	Yamaha	YZF-R6	31	(Spain) Daniel Valle		8
Yamaha MS Racing	Yamaha	YZF-R6	40	(Spain) Unai Orradre		7–12
Yamaha MS Racing	Yamaha	YZF-R6	49	(Spain) Aleix Viu		10
Yamaha MS Racing	Yamaha	YZF-R6	57	(Argentina) Matías Petratti		11
Yamaha MS Racing	Yamaha	YZF-R6	70	(Spain) Marc Alcoba		1–5, 8–9
Yamaha MS Racing	Yamaha	YZF-R6	72	(Spain) Borja Gómez		6
TFC Racing	Yamaha	YZF-R6	20	(France) Vincent Falcone		7
EAB Racing Team	Yamaha	YZF-R6	21	(Switzerland) Randy Krummenacher		1–7
EAB Racing Team	Yamaha	YZF-R6	28	(Netherlands) Glenn van Straalen		8–12
CM Racing	Yamaha	YZF-R6	21	(Switzerland) Randy Krummenacher		8–10, 12
CM Racing	Yamaha	YZF-R6	29	(San Marino) Luca Bernardi		1–7
Ferquest – Unior Racing Team	Yamaha	YZF-R6	26	(Croatia) Martin Vugrinec		5, 9
Promodriver Organization	Yamaha	YZF-R6	27	(Italy) Massimo Roccoli		3
Wójcik Racing Team	Yamaha	YZF-R6	32	(Portugal) Sheridan Morais		4–5, 11
Wójcik Racing Team	Yamaha	YZF-R6	71	(Sweden) Christoffer Bergman		1–3, 6–10, 12
HRP Suzuki	Suzuki	GSX-R600	33	(Finland) Eemeli Lahti		4
HRP Suzuki	Suzuki	GSX-R600	43	(Germany) Luca Grünwald		5
Altogo Racing Team	Yamaha	YZF-R6	34	(Italy) Kevin Manfredi	C	1–10
Altogo Racing Team	Yamaha	YZF-R6	44	(Switzerland) Baris Sahin		8
DK Motorsport	Yamaha	YZF-R6	36	(Austria) Thomas Gradinger	C	1
DK Motorsport	Yamaha	YZF-R6	69	(Spain) Eduardo Montero	C	4–10
Moto Team Jura Vitesse	Yamaha	YZF-R6	42	(Switzerland) Stéphane Frossard	C	1–10
Compos Racing Team by YART	Yamaha	YZF-R6	50	(Czech Republic) Ondřej Vostatek		5
IXS–YART Yamaha	Yamaha	YZF-R6	50	(Czech Republic) Ondřej Vostatek		8–10
IXS–YART Yamaha	Yamaha	YZF-R6	92	(Australia) Bill Van Eerde		8–10
Bonovo MGM Racing	Yamaha	YZF-R6	52	(Germany) Patrick Hobelsberger		8, 10
Extreme Racing Service	MV Agusta	F3 675	63	(Italy) Davide Stirpe		3
MV Agusta Corse Clienti	MV Agusta	F3 675	66	(Finland) Niki Tuuli		All
Andotrans Team Torrentó	Yamaha	YZF-R6	85	(France) Loïc Arbel		8
Bike e Motor Racing Team	Yamaha	YZF-R6	80	(Italy) Armando Pontone		3
Bike e Motor Racing Team	Yamaha	YZF-R6	88	(Italy) Matteo Patacca		3
Yamaha ParkinGO Team	Yamaha	YZF-R6	81	(Spain) Manuel González		All
Team Rosso e Nero	Yamaha	YZF-R6	93	(Italy) Roberto Mercandelli		3

Key
Regular rider
Wildcard rider
Replacement rider
C WorldSSP Challenge

- All entries used Pirelli tyres.

== Championship standings ==
Points

Position	**1st**	**2nd**	**3rd**	**4th**	**5th**	**6th**	**7th**	**8th**	**9th**	**10th**	**11th**	**12th**	**13th**	**14th**	**15th**
Points	25	20	16	13	11	10	9	8	7	6	5	4	3	2	1

=== Riders' championship ===
Pos.	Rider	Bike	ARA (Spain)		EST (Portugal)		MIS (Italy)		ASS (Netherlands)		MOS (Czech Republic)		NAV (Spain)		MAG (France)		BAR (Spain)		JER (Spain)		POR (Portugal)		VIL (Argentina)		MAN (Indonesia)		Pts.
1	(Switzerland) Dominique Aegerter	Yamaha	2	5	4	1	**1**	**1**	**1**	**1**	4	1	**1**	**1**	1	2			C	1	3	5	5	3	**2**	**3**	417
2	(South Africa) Steven Odendaal	Yamaha	1	1	1	Ret	3	5	2	13	1	2	2	2	2	6	8	7	C	8	6	1	4	Ret	6	Ret	323
3	(Spain) Manuel González	Yamaha	5	11	5	4	5	4	6	6	**2**	**3**	Ret	DNS	4	1	**2**	**1**	C	4	2	4	2	10	5	Ret	286
4	(France) Jules Cluzel	Yamaha	**Ret**	**3**	3	12	4	3	4	4	7	Ret	4	5	3	Ret			C	10	**1**	**2**	**1**	**1**	4	1	279
5	(Germany) Philipp Öttl	Kawasaki	3	Ret	2	3	6	6	3	2	3	4	7	6	7	4	5	8	C	**2**	9	8	11	12	12	9	252
6	(Turkey) Can Öncü	Kawasaki	10	14	Ret	7	8	Ret	7	7	8	9	8	Ret	8	3	4	Ret	C	6	8	10	3	2	7	6	182
7	(Italy) Raffaele De Rosa	Kawasaki	9	2	6	Ret	Ret	7	Ret	Ret	12	10	Ret	9	9	9	3	2	C	7	4	14	Ret	Ret	1	5	173
8	(Italy) Federico Caricasulo	Yamaha	6	18	**12**	**6**	Ret	9	8	Ret	5	6	5	4	6	7	18	6	C	5	14	3			3	4	171
9	(San Marino) Luca Bernardi	Yamaha	4	Ret	7	2	2	2	12	5	6	5	3	3	**5**	**Ret**											161
10	(Switzerland) Randy Krummenacher	Yamaha	11	9	9	9	7	Ret	5	3	11	Ret	6	NC	11	14	1	4	C	Ret	7	7			8	8	156
11	(Finland) Niki Tuuli	MV Agusta	Ret	DNS	11	8	9	Ret	Ret	8	9	8	10	7	Ret	5	19	3	C	3	5	Ret	8	Ret	Ret	2	140
12	(Estonia) Hannes Soomer	Yamaha	7	4	8	5	Ret	10	DNS	DNS					15	17	7	11	C	12	13	13	12	4	9	7	105
13	(Hungary) Péter Sebestyén	Yamaha							11	12	10	18	Ret	17	Ret	10	9	15	C	13	11	9	7	5	10	10	76
14	(Sweden) Christoffer Bergman	Yamaha	8	6	10	11	Ret	11					15	12	22	13	12	Ret	C	15	DNS	DNS			Ret	DNS	47
15	(Finland) Vertti Takala	Yamaha	Ret	8	18	13	14	Ret	Ret	10	16	Ret	14	16	Ret	Ret	14	20	C	Ret	21	19	10	7	Ret	11	43
16	(Spain) Marc Alcoba	Yamaha	Ret	7	13	10	16	8	9	9	Ret	DNS					29	19	C	DNS							40
17	(Italy) Kevin Manfredi	Yamaha	13	12	Ret	14	12	Ret	15	11	13	Ret	17	19	12	11	30	Ret	C	17	Ret	11					36
18	(Switzerland) Marcel Brenner	Yamaha									25	12	23	10	18	16	27	5	C	11	19	17	14	9			35
19	(Netherlands) Glenn van Straalen	Yamaha															10	9	C	Ret	Ret	Ret	9	8	13	Ret	31
20	(France) Valentin Debise	Yamaha									Ret	7			Ret	DNS							6	6	DNS	DNS	29
21	(Indonesia) Galang Hendra Pratama	Yamaha	15	10	20	19	13	14	14	Ret	14	DNS	11	Ret	Ret	20	13	22	C	Ret	22	21			Ret	13	27
22	(Denmark) Simon Jespersen	Yamaha											9	8			11	14									22
23	(Italy) Yari Montella	Yamaha																			10	6					16
24	(Spain) Unai Orradre	Yamaha													14	24	16	18	C	Ret	26	Ret	13	14	11	12	16
25	(France) Andy Verdoïa	Yamaha													10	8	Ret	DNS									14
26	(Portugal) Sheridan Morais	Yamaha							10	14	27	15											15	13			13
27	(Spain) David Sanchis	Yamaha											13	11	20	18	Ret	23	C	16	Ret	12					12
28	(Germany) Patrick Hobelsberger	Yamaha									19	DNS					26	10			12	15					11
29	(France) Loïc Arbel	Yamaha															6	Ret									10
30	(Switzerland) Stéphane Frossard	Yamaha	16	16	14	15	19	Ret	18	18	23	16	21	DNS	13	12	20	Ret	C	20	23	22					10
31	(Italy) Leonardo Taccini	Kawasaki	19	19	17	Ret	15	19	16	16	NC	Ret	24	18	17	23	23	13	C	19	16	Ret					9
31	(Italy) Leonardo Taccini	Yamaha																					17	11			9
32	(Italy) Stefano Manzi	Yamaha																	C	9							7
33	(Italy) Matteo Patacca	Yamaha					Ret	13									28	12									7
34	(Spain) María Herrera	Yamaha	12	13	19	20	Ret	Ret	Ret	20			19	22	21	19			C	18	18	23					7
35	(Italy) Federico Fuligni	Yamaha	Ret	17	Ret	16	23	21	17	Ret	15	17	20	13	16	15	25	16	C	14	17	16					7
36	(Italy) Filippo Fuligni	Yamaha					10	Ret																			6
37	(Italy) Michel Fabrizio	Kawasaki	14	21	16	Ret	Ret	Ret	13	15	22	Ret	Ret	20	Ret	DNS	21	21	C	DNS							6
38	(Germany) Max Enderlein	Yamaha									29	11															5
39	(Italy) Roberto Mercandelli	Yamaha					11	Ret																			5
40	(Japan) Hikari Okubo	Kawasaki											12	Ret	DNS	DNS											4
41	(Italy) Massimo Roccoli	Yamaha					Ret	12																			4
42	(Argentina) Andrés González	Yamaha																					16	Ret	14	14	4
43	(Germany) Luca Grünwald	Suzuki									18	13															3
44	(Spain) Daniel Valle	Yamaha											18	14	19	22	17	17							15	Ret	3
45	(Czech Republic) Ondřej Vostatek	Yamaha									20	14					EX	24	C	21	15	18					3
46	(Netherlands) Jeffrey Buis	Kawasaki																					18	15	16	15	2
47	(France) Ludovic Cauchi	Yamaha															15	Ret									1
48	(Spain) Óscar Gutiérrez	Yamaha											Ret	15													1
49	(Italy) Luca Ottaviani	Kawasaki					18	15			24	19															1
50	(Italy) Davide Pizzoli	Yamaha	Ret	Ret	15	17	Ret	18																			1
51	(Poland) Paweł Szkopek	Yamaha	17	15	23	23	WD	WD	Ret	22	26	22															1
	(Italy) Davide Stirpe	MV Agusta					20	16																			0
	(Argentina) Matías Petratti	Yamaha																					NC	16			0
	(Spain) Borja Gómez	Yamaha											16	Ret													0
	(Italy) Luigi Montella	Yamaha	Ret	Ret	21	18	17	Ret	20	19	21	Ret	22	21	23	21	Ret	Ret	C	Ret	24	24					0
	(Finland) Eemeli Lahti	Suzuki							19	17																	0
	(Italy) Armando Pontone	Yamaha					21	17																			0
	(Croatia) Martin Vugrinec	Yamaha									17	Ret							C	Ret							0
	(Japan) Shogo Kawasaki	Kawasaki	18	20	24	22	Ret	22	DNS	DNS							24	25	C	22	DNS	DNS					0
	(Australia) Bill Van Eerde	Yamaha															22	Ret	C	DNS	20	20					0
	(Republic of Ireland) Eugene McManus	Yamaha			22	21	22	20																			0
	(United Kingdom) Danny Webb	Yamaha	DNS	DNS					Ret	Ret	Ret	20															0
	(Spain) Eduardo Montero	Yamaha							21	21	28	21	Ret	Ret	24	25	Ret	Ret	C	Ret	Ret	Ret					0
	(Portugal) Pedro Nuno	Yamaha																			25	Ret					0
	(Switzerland) Baris Sahin	Yamaha															31	26									0
	(Czech Republic) Jiří Mrkývka	Yamaha									30	Ret															0
	(Italy) Mattia Casadei	Yamaha							Ret	Ret																	0
	(France) Vincent Falcone	Yamaha													Ret	DNS											0
	(Austria) Thomas Gradinger	Yamaha	Ret	DNS																							0
	(Spain) Aleix Viu	Yamaha																			DNS	DNS					0
	(Turkey) Kenan Sofuoğlu	Kawasaki																	C	DNS							0
Pos.	Rider	Bike	ARA (Spain)		EST (Portugal)		MIS (Italy)		ASS (Netherlands)		MOS (Czech Republic)		NAV (Spain)		MAG (France)		BAR (Spain)		JER (Spain)		POR (Portugal)		VIL (Argentina)		MAN (Indonesia)		Pts.

Colour	Result
Gold	Winner
Silver	Second place
Bronze	Third place
Green	Points classification
Blue	Non-points classification
Blue	Non-classified finish (NC)
Purple	Retired, not classified (Ret)
Red	Did not qualify (DNQ)
Red	Did not pre-qualify (DNPQ)
Black	Disqualified (DSQ)
White	Did not start (DNS)
White	Withdrew (WD)
White	Race cancelled (C)
Blank	Did not practice (DNP)
Blank	Did not arrive (DNA)
Blank	Excluded (EX)

**Bold** – Pole position
Italics – Fastest lap

=== Teams' championship ===
Pos.	Teams	Bike No.	ARA (Spain)		EST (Portugal)		MIS (Italy)		ASS (Netherlands)		MOS (Czech Republic)		NAV (Spain)		MAG (France)		BAR (Spain)		JER (Spain)		POR (Portugal)		VIL (Argentina)		MAN (Indonesia)		Pts.
Pos.	Teams	Bike No.	R1	R2	R1	R2	R1	R2	R1	R2	R1	R2	R1	R2	R1	R2	R1	R2	R1	R2	R1	R2	R1	R2	R1	R2	Pts.
1	(Netherlands) Ten Kate Racing Yamaha	77	2	5	4	1	**1**	**1**	**1**	**1**	4	1	**1**	**1**	1	2			C	1	3	5	5	3	**2**	**3**	456
1	(Netherlands) Ten Kate Racing Yamaha	55	15	10	20	19	13	14	14	Ret	14	DNS	11	Ret	Ret	20	13	22	C	Ret	22	21			Ret	13	456
1	(Netherlands) Ten Kate Racing Yamaha	9															11	14									456
1	(Netherlands) Ten Kate Racing Yamaha	24																					17	11			456
2	(Italy) Kawasaki Puccetti Racing	5	3	Ret	2	3	6	6	3	2	3	4	7	6	7	4	5	8	C	**2**	9	8	11	12	12	9	434
2	(Italy) Kawasaki Puccetti Racing	61	10	14	Ret	7	8	Ret	7	7	8	9	8	Ret	8	3	4	Ret	C	6	8	10	3	2	7	6	434
2	(Italy) Kawasaki Puccetti Racing	54																	C	DNS							434
3	(Italy) Evan Bros. WorldSSP Yamaha Team	4	1	1	1	Ret	3	5	2	13	1	2	2	2	2	6	8	7	C	8	6	1	4	Ret	6	Ret	399
3	(Italy) Evan Bros. WorldSSP Yamaha Team	56							11	12	10	18	Ret	17	Ret	10	9	15	C	13	11	9	7	5	10	10	399
4	(France) GMT94 Yamaha	16	**Ret**	**3**	3	12	4	3	4	4	7	Ret	4	5	3	Ret			C	10	**1**	**2**	**1**	**1**	4	1	387
4	(France) GMT94 Yamaha	53									Ret	7			Ret	DNS							6	6	DNS	DNS	387
4	(France) GMT94 Yamaha	94	6	18	**12**	**6**	Ret	9	8	Ret																	387
4	(France) GMT94 Yamaha	91																			10	6					387
4	(France) GMT94 Yamaha	30													10	8	Ret	DNS									387
4	(France) GMT94 Yamaha	62																	C	9							387
4	(France) GMT94 Yamaha	31											18	14													387
4	(France) GMT94 Yamaha	14															15	Ret									387
4	(France) GMT94 Yamaha	52									19	DNS															387
5	(Spain) Yamaha ParkinGO Team	81	5	11	5	4	5	4	6	6	**2**	**3**	Ret	DNS	4	1	**2**	**1**	C	4	2	4	2	10	5	Ret	286
6	(Italy) CM Racing	29	4	Ret	7	2	2	2	12	5	6	5	3	3	**5**	**Ret**											233
6	(Italy) CM Racing	21															1	4	C	Ret	7	7			8	8	233
7	(Spain) Orelac Racing VerdNatura	3	9	2	6	Ret	Ret	7	Ret	Ret	12	10	Ret	9	9	9	3	2	C	7	4	14	Ret	Ret	1	5	177
7	(Spain) Orelac Racing VerdNatura	24	19	19	17	Ret	15	19	16	16	NC	Ret	24	18	17	23	23	13	C	19	16	Ret					177
8	(Finland) Kallio Racing	38	7	4	8	5	Ret	10	DNS	DNS					15	17	7	11	C	12	13	13	12	4	9	7	168
8	(Finland) Kallio Racing	95	Ret	8	18	13	14	Ret	Ret	10	16	Ret	14	16	Ret	Ret	14	20	C	Ret	21	19	10	7	Ret	11	168
8	(Finland) Kallio Racing	9											9	8													168
8	(Finland) Kallio Racing	51									29	11															168
9	(Italy) MV Agusta Corse Clienti	66	Ret	DNS	11	8	9	Ret	Ret	8	9	8	10	7	Ret	5	19	3	C	3	5	Ret	8	Ret	Ret	2	140
10	(Netherlands) EAB Racing Team	21	11	9	9	9	7	Ret	5	3	11	Ret	6	NC	11	14											115
10	(Netherlands) EAB Racing Team	28															10	9	C	Ret	Ret	Ret	9	8	13	Ret	115
11	(Italy) Biblion Iberica Yamaha Motoxracing	94									5	6	5	4	6	7	18	6	C	5	14	3					114
11	(Italy) Biblion Iberica Yamaha Motoxracing	6	12	13	19	20	Ret	Ret	Ret	20			19	22	21	19			C	18	18	23					114
11	(Italy) Biblion Iberica Yamaha Motoxracing	88															28	12									114
12	(Italy) VFT Racing	25									25	12	23	10	18	16	27	5	C	11	19	17	14	9			76
12	(Italy) VFT Racing	94																							3	4	76
12	(Italy) VFT Racing	22	Ret	17	Ret	16	23	21	17	Ret	15	17	20	13	16	15	25	16	C	14	17	16					76
12	(Italy) VFT Racing	74																					16	Ret	14	14	76
12	(Italy) VFT Racing	23	Ret	Ret	15	17	Ret	18																			76
12	(Italy) VFT Racing	7							Ret	Ret																	76
13	(Poland) Wójcik Racing Team	71	8	6	10	11	Ret	11					15	12	22	13	12	Ret	C	15	DNS	DNS			Ret	DNS	60
13	(Poland) Wójcik Racing Team	32							10	14	27	15											15	13			60
14	(Brazil) Yamaha MS Racing	70	Ret	7	13	10	16	8	9	9	Ret	DNS					29	19	C	DNS							59
14	(Brazil) Yamaha MS Racing	40													14	24	16	18	C	Ret	26	Ret	13	14	11	12	59
14	(Brazil) Yamaha MS Racing	19	17	15	23	23	WD	WD	Ret	22	26	22															59
14	(Brazil) Yamaha MS Racing	17											Ret	15													59
14	(Brazil) Yamaha MS Racing	31													19	22	17	17							15	Ret	59
14	(Brazil) Yamaha MS Racing	72											16	Ret													59
14	(Brazil) Yamaha MS Racing	57																					NC	16			59
14	(Brazil) Yamaha MS Racing	49																			DNS	DNS					59
15	(Italy) Altogo Racing Team	34	13	12	Ret	14	12	Ret	15	11	13	Ret	17	19	12	11	30	Ret	C	17	Ret	11					36
15	(Italy) Altogo Racing Team	44															31	26									36
16	(Czech Republic) WRP Wepol Racing	96											13	11	20	18	Ret	23	C	16	Ret	12					12
16	(Czech Republic) WRP Wepol Racing	15			22	21	22	20																			12
16	(Czech Republic) WRP Wepol Racing	99	DNS	DNS					Ret	Ret	Ret	20															12
17	(Italy) G.A.P. Motozoo Racing by Puccetti	84	14	21	16	Ret	Ret	Ret	13	15	22	Ret	Ret	20	Ret	DNS	21	21	C	DNS							12
17	(Italy) G.A.P. Motozoo Racing by Puccetti	78											12	Ret	DNS	DNS											12
17	(Italy) G.A.P. Motozoo Racing by Puccetti	64																					18	15	16	15	12
17	(Italy) G.A.P. Motozoo Racing by Puccetti	45	18	20	24	22	Ret	22	DNS	DNS							24	25	C	22	DNS	DNS					12
17	(Italy) G.A.P. Motozoo Racing by Puccetti	11									24	19															12
17	(Italy) G.A.P. Motozoo Racing by Puccetti	82																			25	Ret					12
18	(Germany) Bonovo MGM Racing	52															26	10			12	15					11
19	(Spain) Andotrans Team Torrentó	85															6	Ret									10
20	(Switzerland) Moto Team Jura Vitesse	42	16	16	14	15	19	Ret	18	18	23	16	21	DNS	13	12	20	Ret	C	20	23	22					10
21	(Italy) D34G Racing	12					10	Ret																			6
22	(Italy) Team Rosso e Nero	93					11	Ret																			5
23	(Italy) Promodriver Organization	27					Ret	12																			4
24	(Italy) Bike e Motor Racing Team	88					Ret	13																			3
24	(Italy) Bike e Motor Racing Team	80					21	17																			3
25	(Finland) HRP Suzuki	43									18	13															3
25	(Finland) HRP Suzuki	33							19	17																	3
26	(Austria) IXS–YART Yamaha	50									20	14					EX	24	C	21	15	18					3
26	(Austria) IXS–YART Yamaha	92															22	Ret	C	DNS	20	20					3
27	(Italy) RM Racing	11					18	15																			1
28	(Italy) Extreme Racing Service	63					20	16																			0
29	(Italy) Chiodo Moto Racing	2	Ret	Ret	21	18	17	Ret	20	19	21	Ret	22	21	23	21	Ret	Ret	C	Ret	24	24					0
30	(Croatia) Ferquest – Unior Racing Team	26									17	Ret							C	Ret							0
31	(Spain) DK Motorsport	69							21	21	28	21	Ret	Ret	24	25	Ret	Ret	C	Ret	Ret	Ret					0
31	(Spain) DK Motorsport	36	Ret	DNS																							0
32	(Czech Republic) Maco Racing	10									30	Ret															0
33	(France) TFC Racing	20													Ret	DNS											0
Pos.	Teams	Bike No.	ARA (Spain)		EST (Portugal)		MIS (Italy)		ASS (Netherlands)		MOS (Czech Republic)		NAV (Spain)		MAG (France)		BAR (Spain)		JER (Spain)		POR (Portugal)		VIL (Argentina)		MAN (Indonesia)		Pts.
Pos.	Teams	Bike No.	R1	R2	R1	R2	R1	R2	R1	R2	R1	R2	R1	R2	R1	R2	R1	R2	R1	R2	R1	R2	R1	R2	R1	R2	Pts.

=== Manufacturers' championship ===
Pos.	Manufacturer	ARA (Spain)		EST (Portugal)		MIS (Italy)		ASS (Netherlands)		MOS (Czech Republic)		NAV (Spain)		MAG (France)		BAR (Spain)		JER (Spain)		POR (Portugal)		VIL (Argentina)		MAN (Indonesia)		Pts.
1	(Japan) Yamaha	1	1	1	1	1	1	1	1	1	1	1	1	1	1	1	1	C	1	1	1	1	1	2	1	570
2	(Japan) Kawasaki	3	2	2	3	6	6	3	2	3	4	7	6	7	3	3	2	C	2	4	8	3	2	1	5	350
3	(Italy) MV Agusta	Ret	DNS	11	8	9	16	Ret	8	9	8	10	7	Ret	5	19	3	C	3	5	Ret	8	Ret	Ret	2	140
4	(Japan) Suzuki							19	17	18	13															3
Pos.	Manufacturer	ARA (Spain)		EST (Portugal)		MIS (Italy)		ASS (Netherlands)		MOS (Czech Republic)		NAV (Spain)		MAG (France)		BAR (Spain)		JER (Spain)		POR (Portugal)		VIL (Argentina)		MAN (Indonesia)		Pts.
