= 2021 CIV Supersport 600 Championship =

2021 CIV Supersport 600 Championship
Previous:	2020	Next:	2022
Parent series: 2021 CIV Superbike Championship; Support series: 2021 CIV Supersport 300 Championship; 2021 CIV Moto3 Championship

The 2021 campionato italiano velocità season is the 20th season. The season started on 17 April in Mugello and ends on 10 October in Vallelunga. The season consists of 6 events with 2 races.

== Race calendar ==
All rounds were held in Italy.

Round	Circuit	Date
1	Autodromo Internazionale del Mugello	16–18 April
2	Misano World Circuit Marco Simoncelli	14–16 May
3	Autodromo Internazionale Enzo e Dino Ferrari	2–4 July
4	Misano World Circuit Marco Simoncelli	30 July - 1 August
5	Autodromo Internazionale del Mugello	27–19 August
6	ACI Vallelunga Circuit	8–10 October

== Entry list ==
EntryList
Team	Constructor	Motorcycle	No.	Rider	Rounds
(Italy) Team Rosso e Nero	Yamaha	YZF-R6	3	(Italy) Luca Seren Rosso	4–5
(Italy) Team Rosso e Nero	Yamaha	YZF-R6	27	(Italy) Filippo Rovelli	1–2
(Italy) Team Rosso e Nero	Yamaha	YZF-R6	93	(Italy) Roberto Mercandelli	All
(Italy) Kawasaki Puccetti Racing (Note: Bikes No. 5 and 61 entered as Kawasaki Puccetti Racing and Bike No. 84 entered as G.A.P. MotoZoo Racing by Puccetti.) (Italy) G.A.P. MotoZoo Racing by Puccetti	Kawasaki	ZX-6R	5	(Germany) Philipp Öttl	1
(Italy) Kawasaki Puccetti Racing (Italy) G.A.P. MotoZoo Racing by Puccetti	Kawasaki	ZX-6R	61	(Turkey) Can Öncü	1
(Italy) Kawasaki Puccetti Racing (Italy) G.A.P. MotoZoo Racing by Puccetti	Kawasaki	ZX-6R	84	(Italy) Michel Fabrizio	1
(Italy) Scuderia Improve by Tenjob	Honda	CBR600RR	6	(Italy) Emanuele Pusceddu	1–4
(Italy) Promo Driver Organization	Yamaha	YZF-R6	7	(Italy) Manuel Rocca	All
(Italy) Promo Driver Organization	Yamaha	YZF-R6	55	(Italy) Massimo Roccoli	All
(Italy) MTA Top Talent Team	Yamaha	YZF-R6	8	(Italy) Matteo Porretta	1–2, 4
(Italy) SGM Tecnic	Yamaha	YZF-R6	11	(Italy) Kevin Zannoni	1, 3–6
(Italy) Extreme Racing Service	MV Agusta	F3 675	9	(Italy) Andrea Campaci	6
(Italy) Extreme Racing Service	MV Agusta	F3 675	63	(Italy) Davide Stirpe	All
(Italy) Blacksheep Team	Yamaha	YZF-R6	13	(Italy) Jacopo Facco	1–5
(Italy) Blacksheep Team	Yamaha	YZF-R6	77	(Italy) Marco Muzio	1, 4–6
(Italy) Gomma Racing	Yamaha	YZF-R6	19	(Italy) Alessio Corradi	3
(Italy) Gomma Racing	Yamaha	YZF-R6	25	(France) Andy Verdoia	All
(Italy) Gomma Racing	Yamaha	YZF-R6	55	(Germany) Patrick Holbelberger	6
(Italy) Gomma Racing	Yamaha	YZF-R6	86	(Italy) Eugenio Generali	1–2
(Italy) D34G Racing	Yamaha	YZF-R6	22	(Italy) Filippo Fuligni	1–5
(Italy) VFT Racing	Yamaha	YZF-R6	23	(Italy) Davide Pizzoli	2
(Italy) Axon 7 Team	Yamaha	YZF-R6	24	(Italy) Marco Bussolotti	All
(Italy) Axon 7 Team	Yamaha	YZF-R6	42	(Italy) Roberto Farinelli	2–6
(Italy) Axon 7 Team	Yamaha	YZF-R6	92	(Italy) Nicholas Luzzi	1–5
(Italy) Renzi Racing	Kawasaki	ZX-6R	29	(Belgium) Livio Loi	All
(Italy) Blackflag Motorsport	Kawasaki	ZX-6R	30	(Italy) Edoardo Sintoni	All
(Italy) Team AltoGo	Yamaha	YZF-R6	34	(Italy) Kevin Manfredi	1, 3–6
(Italy) Oscar Team	Yamaha	YZF-R6	35	(Italy) Leonardo Giallini	1
(Italy) Team MMR by Ram	Yamaha	YZF-R6	37	(Australia) Jack Mahaffy	All
(Italy) Team MMR by Ram	Yamaha	YZF-R6	47	(Italy) Nicolò Castellini	5
(Italy) Team MMR by Ram	Yamaha	YZF-R6	59	(Italy) Nicola Bernabè	1–4
(Italy) Team Edard Kawasaki	Kawasaki	ZX-6R	42	(Italy) Roberto Farinelli	1
(Italy) Rosso Corsa	Yamaha	YZF-R6	43	(Italy) Stefano Valtulini	All
(Italy) Rosso Corsa	Yamaha	YZF-R6	75	(Italy) Nicola Settimo	1–2
(Italy) Tucci Racing Team	Yamaha	YZF-R6	44	(Italy) Andrea Tucci	1–3, 5–6
(Italy) AG Motorsport Italia	Yamaha	YZF-R6	53	(Italy) Gianluca Sconza	All
(Italy) Soradis Yamaha Motoxracing	Yamaha	YZF-R6	64	(Italy) Federico Caricasulo	2–6
(Italy) MV Agusta Corse Clienti	MV Agusta	F3 675	66	(Finland) Niki Tuuli	1–2
(Italy) Yamaha ParkinGO Team	Yamaha	YZF-R6	81	(Spain) Manuel González	1–2
(Italy) Bike e Motor Racing Team	Yamaha	YZF-R6	88	(Italy) Matteo Patacca	All
(Italy) RM Racing	Yamaha	YZF-R6	111	(Italy) Luca Ottaviani	All
(Italy) RM Racing	Yamaha	YZF-R6	222	(Italy) Federico Fuligni	1–2, 6
(Italy) RM Racing	Yamaha	YZF-R6	777	(Italy) Mattia Volpi	6

Key
Regular rider
Wildcard rider
Replacement rider

- All entries use Pirelli tyres.

== Results ==
Round		Circuit	Date	Pole	Fastest lap	Winning rider	Winning team	Winning Constructor
1	R1	Mugello 1	17 April	(Germany) Philipp Öttl	(Italy) Federico Fuligni	(Italy) Roberto Mercandelli (Note: Philipp Öttl won the race but due to him being a Wild Card Entry he competed outside the classification.)	(Italy) Team Rosso e Nero (Note: Philipp Öttl won the race but due to him being a Wild Card Entry he competed outside the classification, therefore also Kawasaki Puccetti Racing competed outside the classification.)	(Japan) Yamaha (Note: Philipp Öttl won the race but due to him being a Wild Card Entry he competed outside the classification, therefore also Kawasaki competed outside the classification.)
1	R2	Mugello 1	18 April	(Germany) Philipp Öttl	(Germany) Philipp Öttl	(Italy) Davide Stirpe	(Italy) Extreme Racing Service	(Italy) MV Agusta
2	R1	Misano 1	15 May	(Finland) Niki Tuuli	(Finland) Niki Tuuli	(Italy) Massimo Roccoli (Note: Niki Tuuli won the race but due to him being a Wild Card Entry he competed outside the classification.)	(Italy) Promo Driver Organization (Note: Niki Tuuli won the race but due to him being a Wild Card Entry he competed outside the classification, therefore also MV Agusta Corse Clienti competed outside the classification.)	(Japan) Yamaha (Note: Niki Tuuli won the race but due to him being a Wild Card Entry he competed outside the classification, therefore also MV Agusta competed outside the classification.)
2	R2	Misano 1	16 May	(France) Andy Verdoïa (Note: Niki Tuuli was supposed to start from the pole position, but he didn't participate the race. Therefore the pole position slot was taken by Andy Verdoïa.)	(Italy) Kevin Manfredi	(Italy) Federico Caricasulo	(Italy) Soradis Yamaha Motoxracing	(Japan) Yamaha
3	R1	Imola	3 July	(Italy) Federico Caricasulo	(Italy) Massimo Roccoli	(Italy) Roberto Mercandelli	(Italy) Team Rosso e Nero	(Japan) Yamaha
3	R2	Imola	4 July	(Italy) Federico Caricasulo	(France) Andy Verdoïa	(Italy) Marco Bussolotti	(Italy) Axon 7 Team	(Japan) Yamaha
4	R1	Misano 2	31 July	(Italy) Federico Caricasulo	(Italy) Federico Caricasulo	(Italy) Federico Caricasulo	(Italy) Soradis Yamaha Motoxracing	(Japan) Yamaha
4	R2	Misano 2	1 August	(Italy) Federico Caricasulo	(Italy) Federico Caricasulo	(Italy) Federico Caricasulo	(Italy) Soradis Yamaha Motoxracing	(Japan) Yamaha
5	R1	Mugello 2	28 August	(Italy) Luca Ottaviani	(Belgium) Livio Loi	(Italy) Federico Caricasulo	(Italy) Soradis Yamaha Motoxracing	(Japan) Yamaha
5	R2	Mugello 2	29 August	(Italy) Luca Ottaviani	(Italy) Federico Caricasulo	(Italy) Federico Caricasulo	(Italy) Soradis Yamaha Motoxracing	(Japan) Yamaha
6	R1	Vallelunga	9 October	(Italy) Roberto Mercandelli	(Italy) Federico Caricasulo	(Italy) Davide Stirpe	(Italy) Extreme Racing Service	(Italy) MV Agusta
6	R2	Vallelunga	10 October	(Italy) Roberto Mercandelli	(Germany) Patrick Hobelsberger	(Italy) Federico Caricasulo	(Italy) Soradis Yamaha Motoxracing	(Japan) Yamaha

== Championship standings ==
=== Riders' standings ===
Position	1st	2nd	3rd	4th	5th	6th	7th	8th	9th	10th	11th	12th	13th	14th	15th
Points	25	20	16	13	11	10	9	8	7	6	5	4	3	2	1

Pos.	Rider	Manufacturer	MUG		MIS		IMO		MIS		MUG		VAL		Pts.
1	(Italy) Davide Stirpe	MV Agusta	5	1	14	11	2	3	4	4	3	2	1	4	179
2	(Italy) Roberto Mercandelli	Yamaha	1	3	5	12	1	8	2	3	7	4	3^{P}	3^{P}	179
3	(Italy) Federico Caricasulo	Yamaha			Ret	1	Ret^{P}	Ret^{P}	1^{PF}	1^{PF}	1	1^{F}	2^{F}	1	170
4	(Italy) Massimo Roccoli	Yamaha	2	2	1	7	Ret^{F}	5	3	8	4	8	4	12	147
5	(Italy) Marco Bussolotti	Yamaha	4	6	3	2	3	1	Ret	7	12	12	5	13	131
6	(France) Andy Verdoïa	Yamaha	Ret	7	2	4^{P}	12	6^{F}	5	2	2	6	NC	9	124
7	(Italy) Matteo Patacca	Yamaha	11	12	9	5	9	10	13	5	6	3	10	5	97
8	(Italy) Kevin Manfredi	Yamaha	12	11	8	20^{F}	4	2	6	Ret	9	5	7	7	96
9	(Italy) Stefano Valtulini	Yamaha	18	5	4	6	7	4	8	6	Ret	9	13	Ret	84
10	(Italy) Edoardo Sintoni	Kawasaki	6	9	6	Ret	10	12	9	11	5	19	11	8	73
11	(Italy) Filippo Fuligni	Yamaha	10	10	7	3	6	Ret	Ret	10	8	7	DNS	DNS	70
12	(Italy) Luca Ottaviani	Yamaha	7	Ret	10	22	Ret	7	10	9	Ret^{P}	10^{P}	6	6	63
13	(Belgium) Livio Loi	Kawasaki	8	16	12	9	8	11	11	15	11^{F}	11	9	Ret	55
14	(Italy) Kevin Zannoni	Yamaha	16	18			5	9	7	Ret	10	Ret	8	10	47
15	(Italy) Andrea Tucci	Yamaha	9	8	16	13	13	13	DNS	13	17	14	12	15	34
16	(Spain) Manuel González	Yamaha	3	4	EX (Note: Manuel González originally finished in 2nd position but due to him being a wild card entry he competed outside of the classification.)	Ret									29
17	(Germany) Patrick Hobelsberger	Yamaha											Ret	2^{F}	20
18	(Italy) Manuel Rocca	Yamaha	17	20	13	14	14	15	14	Ret	14	15	15	14	16
19	(Italy) Roberto Farinelli	Kawasaki	Ret	DNS											13
19	(Italy) Roberto Farinelli	Yamaha			15	8	15	Ret	18	Ret	Ret	13	Ret	Ret	13
20	(Italy) Eugenio Generali	Yamaha	13	14	20	10									11
21	(Australia) Jack Mahaffy	Yamaha	14	13	22	17	11	17	Ret	18	Ret	Ret	WD	WD	10
22	(Italy) Emanuele Pusceddu	Honda	Ret	Ret	11	21	Ret	14	15	14					10
23	(Italy) Jacopo Facco	Yamaha	15	15	17	Ret	18	16	12	12	Ret	DNS			10
24	(Italy) Federico Fuligni	Yamaha	EX^{F} (Note: Federico Fuligni originally finished in 2nd position but due to him being a wild card entry he competed outside of the classification.)	EX	EX (Note: Federico Fuligni originally finished in 10th position but due to him being a wild card entry he competed outside of the classification.)	DNS							16	11	5
25	(Italy) Nicolò Castellini	Yamaha									13	Ret			3
26	(Italy) Gianluca Sconza	Yamaha	19	19	18	16	17	19	17	16	16	16	14	16	2
27	(Italy) Marco Muzio	Yamaha	DNS	DNS					16	17	15	Ret	Ret	Ret	1
28	(Italy) Nicholas Luzzi	Yamaha	23	23	21	15	19	20	20	19	18	18			1
	(Italy) Nicola Bernabè	Yamaha	20	17	Ret	18	Ret	Ret	19	Ret					0
	(Italy) Luca Seren Rosso	Yamaha							Ret	20	19	17			0
	(Italy) Matteo Porretta	Yamaha	22	22	19	19			21	Ret					0
	(Italy) Filippo Rovelli	Yamaha	21	Ret	23	Ret									0
	(Italy) Nicola Settimo	Yamaha	Ret	21	DNS	DNS									0
	(Italy) Leonardo Giallini	Yamaha	24	24											0
	(Italy) Alessio Corradi	Yamaha					Ret	DNS							0
Wildcard entries ineligible for points
	(Germany) Philipp Öttl	Kawasaki	1^{EXP}	1^{EXPF}											
	(Finland) Niki Tuuli	MV Agusta	WD	WD	1^{EXPF}	DNS									
	(Turkey) Can Öncü	Kawasaki	4^{EX}	3^{EX}											
	(Italy) Michel Fabrizio	Kawasaki	6^{EX}	9^{EX}											
	(Italy) Mattia Volpi	Yamaha											17	Ret	
	(Italy) Davide Pizzoli	Yamaha			Ret	DNS									
	(Italy) Andrea Campaci	MV Agusta											DNS	DNS	
Pos.	Rider	Manufacturer	MUG		MIS		IMO		MIS		MUG		VAL		Pts.

Colour	Result
Gold	Winner
Silver	Second place
Bronze	Third place
Green	Points classification
Blue	Non-points classification
Blue	Non-classified finish (NC)
Purple	Retired, not classified (Ret)
Red	Did not qualify (DNQ)
Red	Did not pre-qualify (DNPQ)
Black	Disqualified (DSQ)
White	Did not start (DNS)
White	Withdrew (WD)
White	Race cancelled (C)
Blank	Did not practice (DNP)
Blank	Did not arrive (DNA)
Blank	Excluded (EX)

P – Pole position
F – Fastest lap
Source :
