= 2018 Dutch TT =

(Netherlands) 2018 Dutch TT
Race details
- Race 8 of 19 races in the 2018 Grand Prix motorcycle racing season
- Date: 1 July 2018
- Official name: Motul TT Assen
- Location: TT Circuit Assen, Assen, Netherlands
- Course: Permanent racing facility; 4.542 km (2.822 mi)

MotoGP
Pole position
Rider	(Spain) Marc Márquez	Honda
Time	1:32.791	
Fastest lap
Rider	(Spain) Maverick Viñales	Yamaha
Time	1:34.113 on lap 6	
Podium
First	(Spain) Marc Márquez	Honda
Second	(Spain) Álex Rins	Suzuki
Third	(Spain) Maverick Viñales	Yamaha

Moto2
Pole position
Rider	(Italy) Francesco Bagnaia	Kalex
Time	1:37.608	
Fastest lap
Rider	(Italy) Lorenzo Baldassarri	Kalex
Time	1:38.030 on lap 8	
Podium
First	(Italy) Francesco Bagnaia	Kalex
Second	(France) Fabio Quartararo	Speed Up
Third	(Spain) Álex Márquez	Kalex

Moto3
Pole position
Rider	(Spain) Jorge Martín	Honda
Time	1:42.039	
Fastest lap
Rider	(Spain) Arón Canet	Honda
Time	1:42.007 on lap 5	
Podium
First	(Spain) Jorge Martín	Honda
Second	(Spain) Arón Canet	Honda
Third	(Italy) Enea Bastianini	Honda

The 2018 Dutch TT was the eighth round of the 2018 MotoGP season. It was held at the TT Circuit Assen in Assen on 1 July 2018.

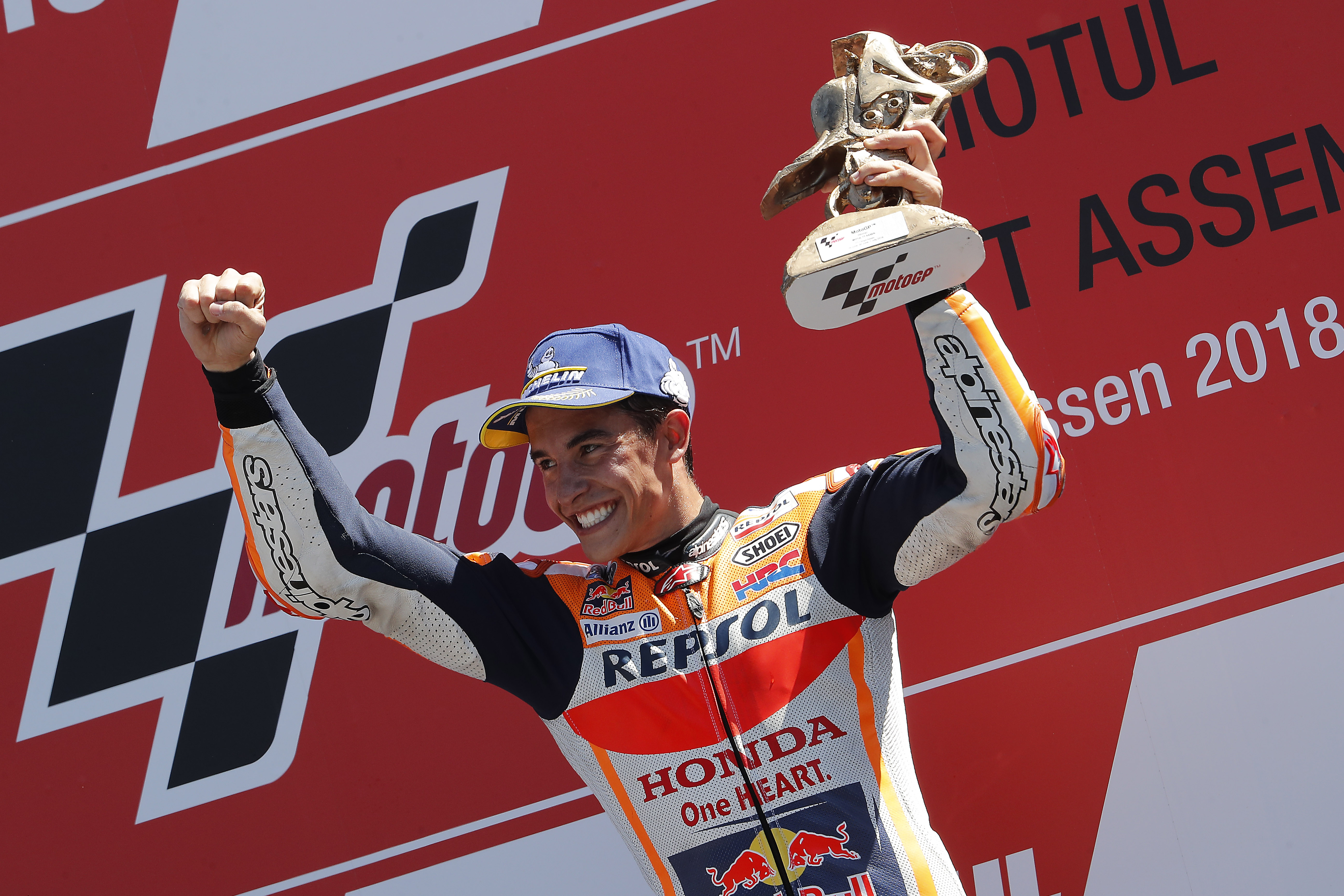
Marc Márquez, celebrating on the podium after winning the MotoGP race.

== Classification ==
=== MotoGP ===
Pos.	No.	Rider	Team	Manufacturer	Laps	Time/Retired	Grid	Points
1	93	(Spain) Marc Márquez	Repsol Honda Team	Honda	26	41:13.863	1	25
2	42	(Spain) Álex Rins	Team Suzuki Ecstar	Suzuki	26	+2.269	5	20
3	25	(Spain) Maverick Viñales	Movistar Yamaha MotoGP	Yamaha	26	+2.308	6	16
4	4	(Italy) Andrea Dovizioso	Ducati Team	Ducati	26	+2.422	4	13
5	46	(Italy) Valentino Rossi	Movistar Yamaha MotoGP	Yamaha	26	+2.963	3	11
6	35	(United Kingdom) Cal Crutchlow	LCR Honda Castrol	Honda	26	+3.876	2	10
7	99	(Spain) Jorge Lorenzo	Ducati Team	Ducati	26	+4.462	10	9
8	5	(France) Johann Zarco	Monster Yamaha Tech 3	Yamaha	26	+7.001	8	8
9	19	(Spain) Álvaro Bautista	Ángel Nieto Team	Ducati	26	+7.541	12	7
10	43	(Australia) Jack Miller	Alma Pramac Racing	Ducati	26	+13.056	16	6
11	29	(Italy) Andrea Iannone	Team Suzuki Ecstar	Suzuki	26	+14.255 (Note: 2-second penalty.)	9	5
12	44	(Spain) Pol Espargaró	Red Bull KTM Factory Racing	KTM	26	+15.876	21	4
13	41	(Spain) Aleix Espargaró	Aprilia Racing Team Gresini	Aprilia	26	+15.986	7	3
14	45	(United Kingdom) Scott Redding	Aprilia Racing Team Gresini	Aprilia	26	+16.019	17	2
15	26	(Spain) Dani Pedrosa	Repsol Honda Team	Honda	26	+16.043	18	1
16	53	(Spain) Tito Rabat	Reale Avintia Racing	Ducati	26	+16.416	14	
17	38	(United Kingdom) Bradley Smith	Red Bull KTM Factory Racing	KTM	26	+29.073	20	
18	55	(Malaysia) Hafizh Syahrin	Monster Yamaha Tech 3	Yamaha	26	+33.824	15	
19	30	(Japan) Takaaki Nakagami	LCR Honda Idemitsu	Honda	26	+34.037 (Note: 1.5-second penalty.)	13	
20	12	(Switzerland) Thomas Lüthi	EG 0,0 Marc VDS	Honda	26	+47.853	22	
Ret	9	(Italy) Danilo Petrucci	Alma Pramac Racing	Ducati	17	Accident	11	
Ret	10	(Belgium) Xavier Siméon	Reale Avintia Racing	Ducati	17	Tyre Vibration	23	
Ret	17	(Czech Republic) Karel Abraham	Ángel Nieto Team	Ducati	11	Rear End Sensor	19	
DNS	21	(Italy) Franco Morbidelli	EG 0,0 Marc VDS	Honda		Did not start		
Sources:

- Franco Morbidelli suffered a broken finger in a crash during free practice and was declared unfit to start the race.

=== Moto2 ===
Pos.	No.	Rider	Manufacturer	Laps	Time/Retired	Grid	Points
1	42	(Italy) Francesco Bagnaia	Kalex	24	39:30.436	1	25
2	20	(France) Fabio Quartararo	Speed Up	24	+1.748	10 (Note: 3-place grid penalty.)	20
3	73	(Spain) Álex Márquez	Kalex	24	+2.179	4	16
4	23	(Germany) Marcel Schrötter	Kalex	24	+4.094	2	13
5	36	(Spain) Joan Mir	Kalex	24	+4.342	9	11
6	44	(Portugal) Miguel Oliveira	KTM	24	+5.230	17	10
7	41	(South Africa) Brad Binder	KTM	24	+9.568	20	9
8	10	(Italy) Luca Marini	Kalex	24	+9.960	3	8
9	22	(United Kingdom) Sam Lowes	KTM	24	+14.133	6	7
10	5	(Italy) Andrea Locatelli	Kalex	24	+14.332	7	6
11	54	(Italy) Mattia Pasini	Kalex	24	+18.525	11	5
12	40	(Spain) Augusto Fernández	Kalex	24	+20.297	16	4
13	9	(Spain) Jorge Navarro	Kalex	24	+20.867	8	3
14	77	(Switzerland) Dominique Aegerter	KTM	24	+27.394	19	2
15	24	(Italy) Simone Corsi	Kalex	24	+28.424	30 (Note: Back of the grid start penalty.)	1
16	27	(Spain) Iker Lecuona	KTM	24	+28.505	22	
17	64	(Netherlands) Bo Bendsneyder	Tech 3	24	+28.674 (Note: 1.4-second penalty.)	23	
18	87	(Australia) Remy Gardner	Tech 3	24	+28.888	18	
19	89	(Malaysia) Khairul Idham Pawi	Kalex	24	+29.441	12	
20	4	(South Africa) Steven Odendaal	NTS	24	+39.321	25	
21	16	(United States) Joe Roberts	NTS	24	+39.407	27	
22	32	(Spain) Isaac Viñales	Kalex	24	+39.750	15	
23	95	(France) Jules Danilo	Kalex	24	+48.946	28	
24	51	(Brazil) Eric Granado	Suter	24	+48.976	26	
25	21	(Italy) Federico Fuligni	Kalex	24	+1:27.879	29	
26	7	(Italy) Lorenzo Baldassarri	Kalex	23	+1 lap	13	
Ret	13	(Italy) Romano Fenati	Kalex	20	Accident	14	
Ret	97	(Spain) Xavi Vierge	Kalex	9	Accident	5	
Ret	62	(Italy) Stefano Manzi	Suter	6	Accident	24	
Ret	52	(United Kingdom) Danny Kent	Speed Up	0	Accident	21	
DNS	66	(Finland) Niki Tuuli	Kalex		Did not start		
DNS	18	(Andorra) Xavi Cardelús	Kalex		Did not start		
DNS	45	(Japan) Tetsuta Nagashima	Kalex		Did not start		
OFFICIAL MOTO2 REPORT

- Niki Tuuli suffered a broken finger in a crash during qualifying and withdrew from the event.
- Xavi Cardelús suffered a broken collarbone in a crash during qualifying and withdrew from the event.
- Tetsuta Nagashima suffered a hand injury in a crash during free practice and withdrew from the event.

=== Moto3 ===
Pos.	No.	Rider	Manufacturer	Laps	Time/Retired	Grid	Points
1	88	(Spain) Jorge Martín	Honda	22	37:56.485	1	25
2	44	(Spain) Arón Canet	Honda	22	+0.665	4	20
3	33	(Italy) Enea Bastianini	Honda	22	+0.718	2	16
4	5	(Spain) Jaume Masiá	KTM	22	+10.842	15	13
5	84	(Czech Republic) Jakub Kornfeil	KTM	22	+10.953	23 (Note: 12-place grid penalty.)	11
6	48	(Italy) Lorenzo Dalla Porta	Honda	22	+11.321	5	10
7	40	(South Africa) Darryn Binder	KTM	22	+11.343	17	9
8	19	(Argentina) Gabriel Rodrigo	KTM	22	+11.737	10	8
9	21	(Italy) Fabio Di Giannantonio	Honda	22	+11.756	7	7
10	42	(Spain) Marcos Ramírez	KTM	22	+11.766	9	6
11	8	(Italy) Nicolò Bulega	KTM	22	+11.777	3	5
12	10	(Italy) Dennis Foggia	KTM	22	+15.973 (Note: 4-second penalty.)	28	4
13	24	(Japan) Tatsuki Suzuki	Honda	22	+23.283	16	3
14	75	(Spain) Albert Arenas	KTM	22	+23.767	19 (Note: 6-place grid penalty.)	2
15	23	(Italy) Niccolò Antonelli	Honda	22	+23.827	12	1
16	27	(Japan) Kaito Toba	Honda	22	+23.850	29	
17	14	(Italy) Tony Arbolino	Honda	22	+24.040	11	
18	65	(Germany) Philipp Öttl	KTM	22	+25.802 (Note: 1.8-second penalty.)	14	
19	71	(Japan) Ayumu Sasaki	Honda	22	+27.097	27	
20	22	(Japan) Kazuki Masaki	KTM	22	+27.196	24	
21	7	(Malaysia) Adam Norrodin	Honda	22	+27.260	30	
22	41	(Thailand) Nakarin Atiratphuvapat	Honda	22	+27.403	20	
23	32	(Japan) Ai Ogura	Honda	22	+27.644	22	
24	11	(Belgium) Livio Loi	KTM	22	+28.039	13	
25	72	(Spain) Alonso López	Honda	22	+30.519 (Note: 2.9-second penalty.)	21	
26	16	(Italy) Andrea Migno	KTM	22	+34.938	18	
27	81	(Italy) Stefano Nepa	KTM	22	+52.070	25	
28	18	(Netherlands) Ryan van de Lagemaat	KTM	21	+1 lap	26	
Ret	12	(Italy) Marco Bezzecchi	KTM	21	Accident	8	
Ret	17	(United Kingdom) John McPhee	KTM	20	Accident	6	
OFFICIAL MOTO3 REPORT

== Championship standings after the race ==
=== MotoGP ===
Pos.	Rider	Points
1	(Spain) Marc Márquez	140
2	(Italy) Valentino Rossi	99
3	(Spain) Maverick Viñales	93
4	(France) Johann Zarco	81
5	(Italy) Andrea Dovizioso	79
6	(United Kingdom) Cal Crutchlow	79
7	(Spain) Jorge Lorenzo	75
8	(Italy) Danilo Petrucci	71
9	(Italy) Andrea Iannone	71
10	(Australia) Jack Miller	55

=== Moto2 ===
Pos.	Rider	Points
1	(Italy) Francesco Bagnaia	144
2	(Portugal) Miguel Oliveira	128
3	(Spain) Álex Márquez	110
4	(Italy) Lorenzo Baldassarri	93
5	(Spain) Joan Mir	75
6	(Spain) Xavi Vierge	70
7	(South Africa) Brad Binder	66
8	(France) Fabio Quartararo	65
9	(Italy) Mattia Pasini	63
10	(Germany) Marcel Schrötter	63

=== Moto3 ===
Pos.	Rider	Points
1	(Spain) Jorge Martín	105
2	(Italy) Marco Bezzecchi	103
3	(Italy) Fabio Di Giannantonio	91
4	(Italy) Enea Bastianini	84
5	(Spain) Arón Canet	81
6	(Argentina) Gabriel Rodrigo	65
7	(Italy) Andrea Migno	56
8	(Czech Republic) Jakub Kornfeil	52
9	(Italy) Niccolò Antonelli	44
10	(Spain) Marcos Ramírez	43

== Notes ==
Previous race: 2018 Catalan Grand Prix	FIM Grand Prix World Championship; 2018 season	Next race: 2018 German Grand Prix
Previous race: 2017 Dutch TT	Dutch TT	Next race: 2019 Dutch TT
