= 2018 German motorcycle Grand Prix =

(Germany) 2018 German Grand Prix
Race details
- Race 9 of 19 races in the 2018 Grand Prix motorcycle racing season
- Date: 15 July 2018
- Official name: Pramac Motorrad Grand Prix Deutschland
- Location: Sachsenring, Hohenstein-Ernstthal, Germany
- Course: Permanent racing facility; 3.671 km (2.281 mi)

MotoGP
Pole position
Rider	(Spain) Marc Márquez	Honda
Time	1:20.270	
Fastest lap
Rider	(Spain) Marc Márquez	Honda
Time	1:21.643 on lap 22	
Podium
First	(Spain) Marc Márquez	Honda
Second	(Italy) Valentino Rossi	Yamaha
Third	(Spain) Maverick Viñales	Yamaha

Moto2
Pole position
Rider	(Italy) Mattia Pasini	Kalex
Time	1:23.787	
Fastest lap
Rider	(Spain) Joan Mir	Kalex
Time	1:24.634 on lap 3	
Podium
First	(South Africa) Brad Binder	KTM
Second	(Spain) Joan Mir	Kalex
Third	(Italy) Luca Marini	Kalex

Moto3
Pole position
Rider	(Spain) Jorge Martín	Honda
Time	1:26.434	
Fastest lap
Rider	(Spain) Arón Canet	Honda
Time	1:27.136 on lap 11	
Podium
First	(Spain) Jorge Martín	Honda
Second	(Italy) Marco Bezzecchi	KTM
Third	(United Kingdom) John McPhee	KTM

The 2018 German motorcycle Grand Prix was the ninth round of the 2018 MotoGP season. It was held at the Sachsenring in Hohenstein-Ernstthal on 15 July 2018.

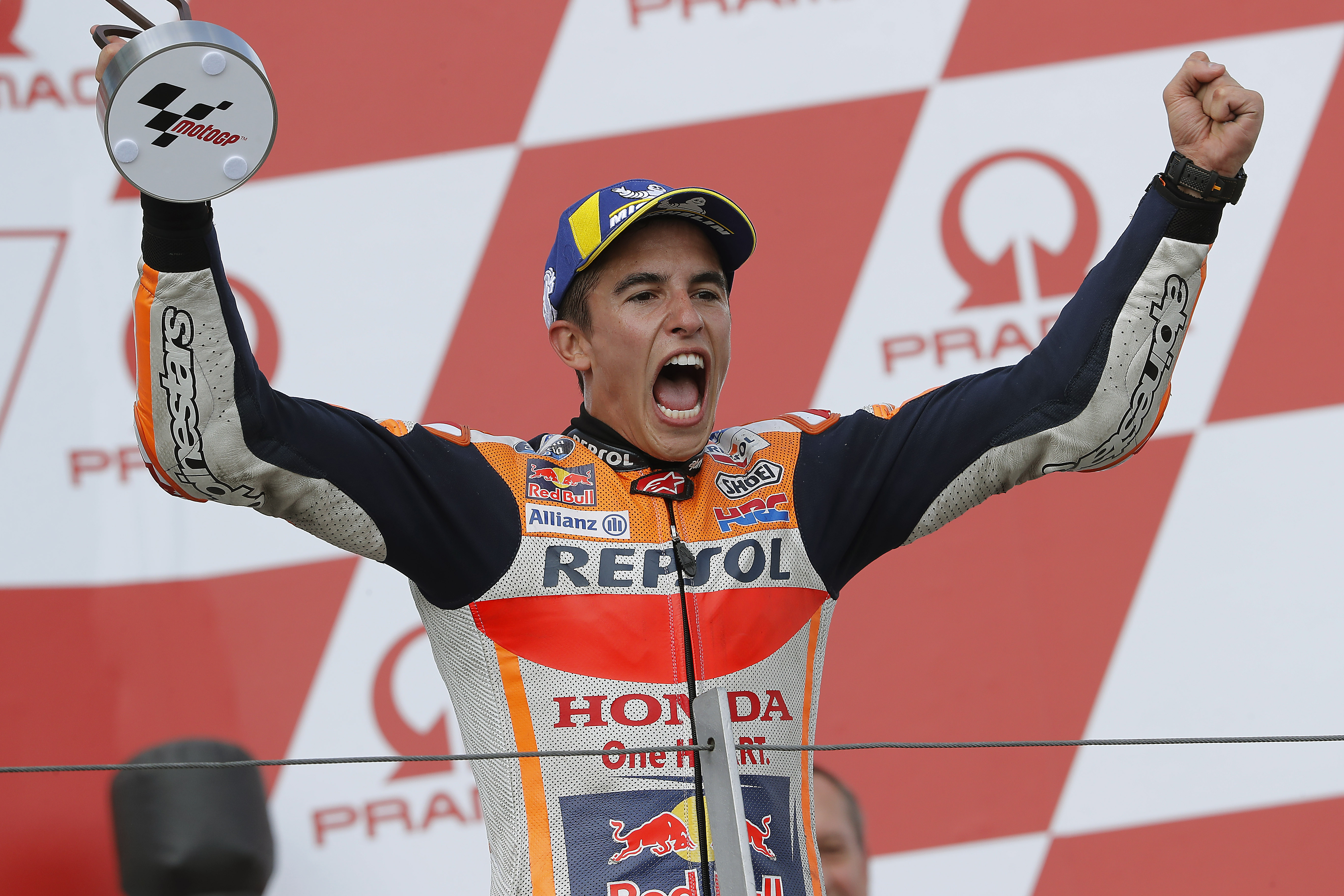
Marc Márquez, celebrating on the podium after winning the MotoGP race.

== Classification ==
=== MotoGP ===
Franco Morbidelli was replaced by Stefan Bradl after the first practice session due to injury.

Pos.	No.	Rider	Team	Manufacturer	Laps	Time/Retired	Grid	Points
1	93	(Spain) Marc Márquez	Repsol Honda Team	Honda	30	41:05.019	1	25
2	46	(Italy) Valentino Rossi	Movistar Yamaha MotoGP	Yamaha	30	+2.196	6	20
3	25	(Spain) Maverick Viñales	Movistar Yamaha MotoGP	Yamaha	30	+2.776	4	16
4	9	(Italy) Danilo Petrucci	Alma Pramac Racing	Ducati	30	+3.376	2	13
5	19	(Spain) Álvaro Bautista	Ángel Nieto Team	Ducati	30	+5.183	9	11
6	99	(Spain) Jorge Lorenzo	Ducati Team	Ducati	30	+5.780	3	10
7	4	(Italy) Andrea Dovizioso	Ducati Team	Ducati	30	+7.941	5	9
8	26	(Spain) Dani Pedrosa	Repsol Honda Team	Honda	30	+12.711	10	8
9	5	(France) Johann Zarco	Monster Yamaha Tech 3	Yamaha	30	+14.428	13	7
10	38	(United Kingdom) Bradley Smith	Red Bull KTM Factory Racing	KTM	30	+21.474	16	6
11	55	(Malaysia) Hafizh Syahrin	Monster Yamaha Tech 3	Yamaha	30	+25.809	17	5
12	29	(Italy) Andrea Iannone	Team Suzuki Ecstar	Suzuki	30	+25.963	8	4
13	53	(Spain) Tito Rabat	Reale Avintia Racing	Ducati	30	+29.040	18	3
14	43	(Australia) Jack Miller	Alma Pramac Racing	Ducati	30	+29.325	14	2
15	45	(United Kingdom) Scott Redding	Aprilia Racing Team Gresini	Aprilia	30	+34.123	19	1
16	6	(Germany) Stefan Bradl	EG 0,0 Marc VDS	Honda	30	+38.207	20	
17	12	(Switzerland) Thomas Lüthi	EG 0,0 Marc VDS	Honda	30	+49.369	21	
18	17	(Czech Republic) Karel Abraham	Ángel Nieto Team	Ducati	30	+1:01.022	22	
19	10	(Belgium) Xavier Siméon	Reale Avintia Racing	Ducati	30	+1:16.692	23	
Ret	35	(United Kingdom) Cal Crutchlow	LCR Honda Castrol	Honda	9	Accident	7	
Ret	30	(Japan) Takaaki Nakagami	LCR Honda Idemitsu	Honda	4	Accident	12	
Ret	42	(Spain) Álex Rins	Team Suzuki Ecstar	Suzuki	0	Collision	11	
Ret	44	(Spain) Pol Espargaró	Red Bull KTM Factory Racing	KTM	0	Collision	15	
DNS	41	(Spain) Aleix Espargaró	Aprilia Racing Team Gresini	Aprilia		Did not start		
DNS	36	(Finland) Mika Kallio	Red Bull KTM Factory Racing	KTM		Did not start		
WD	21	(Italy) Franco Morbidelli	EG 0,0 Marc VDS	Honda		Withdrew		
Sources:

- Aleix Espargaró suffered a thoracic trauma following a crash in the warm-up session and was declared unfit to start the race.
- Mika Kallio suffered a knee injury in a crash during practice and withdrew from the event.

=== Moto2 ===
Pos.	No.	Rider	Manufacturer	Laps	Time/Retired	Grid	Points
1	41	(South Africa) Brad Binder	KTM	28	39:46.306	10	25
2	36	(Spain) Joan Mir	Kalex	28	+0.779	8	20
3	10	(Italy) Luca Marini	Kalex	28	+0.933	2	16
4	44	(Portugal) Miguel Oliveira	KTM	28	+2.143	15	13
5	22	(United Kingdom) Sam Lowes	KTM	28	+6.376	4	11
6	23	(Germany) Marcel Schrötter	Kalex	28	+6.513	9	10
7	97	(Spain) Xavi Vierge	Kalex	28	+15.544	6	9
8	24	(Italy) Simone Corsi	Kalex	28	+15.674	19	8
9	20	(France) Fabio Quartararo	Speed Up	28	+16.004	18	7
10	9	(Spain) Jorge Navarro	Kalex	28	+16.005	16	6
11	87	(Australia) Remy Gardner	Tech 3	28	+16.596	20	5
12	42	(Italy) Francesco Bagnaia	Kalex	28	+17.304	3	4
13	73	(Spain) Álex Márquez	Kalex	28	+17.458	7	3
14	77	(Switzerland) Dominique Aegerter	KTM	28	+18.138	23	2
15	40	(Spain) Augusto Fernández	Kalex	28	+23.816	13	1
16	13	(Italy) Romano Fenati	Kalex	28	+24.611	11	
17	89	(Malaysia) Khairul Idham Pawi	Kalex	28	+25.617	24	
18	4	(South Africa) Steven Odendaal	NTS	28	+28.019	22	
19	27	(Spain) Iker Lecuona	KTM	28	+28.173	25	
20	64	(Netherlands) Bo Bendsneyder	Tech 3	28	+36.398	21	
21	51	(Brazil) Eric Granado	Suter	28	+40.199	27	
22	16	(United States) Joe Roberts	NTS	28	+41.509	29	
23	21	(Italy) Federico Fuligni	Kalex	28	+1:04.024	31	
24	18	(Andorra) Xavi Cardelús	Kalex	27	+1 lap	32	
25	62	(Italy) Stefano Manzi	Suter	21	+7 laps	30 (Note: 3-place grid penalty.)	
Ret	32	(Spain) Isaac Viñales	Kalex	16	Retired	14	
Ret	52	(United Kingdom) Danny Kent	Speed Up	7	Accident	12	
Ret	45	(Japan) Tetsuta Nagashima	Kalex	4	Accident	26	
Ret	7	(Italy) Lorenzo Baldassarri	Kalex	2	Accident	5	
Ret	54	(Italy) Mattia Pasini	Kalex	1	Accident	1	
Ret	5	(Italy) Andrea Locatelli	Kalex	1	Accident	17	
DNS	95	(France) Jules Danilo	Kalex		Electrics	28	
DNS	66	(Finland) Niki Tuuli	Kalex		Did not start		
OFFICIAL MOTO2 REPORT

- Jules Danilo suffered an electrical failure on the grid and failed to start the race.
- Niki Tuuli experienced pain from the finger injury suffered at the previous round at Assen and withdrew from the event.

=== Moto3 ===
Pos.	No.	Rider	Manufacturer	Laps	Time/Retired	Grid	Points
1	88	(Spain) Jorge Martín	Honda	27	39:36.427	1	25
2	12	(Italy) Marco Bezzecchi	KTM	27	+2.515	7	20
3	17	(United Kingdom) John McPhee	KTM	27	+2.571	8	16
4	42	(Spain) Marcos Ramírez	KTM	27	+2.936	2	13
5	44	(Spain) Arón Canet	Honda	27	+3.028	5	11
6	5	(Spain) Jaume Masiá	KTM	27	+3.341	4	10
7	84	(Czech Republic) Jakub Kornfeil	KTM	27	+3.532	21	9
8	65	(Germany) Philipp Öttl	KTM	27	+4.886	13	8
9	25	(Spain) Raúl Fernández	KTM	27	+5.383	17	7
10	71	(Japan) Ayumu Sasaki	Honda	27	+5.486	9	6
11	7	(Malaysia) Adam Norrodin	Honda	27	+5.610	16	5
12	16	(Italy) Andrea Migno	KTM	27	+9.938	24	4
13	48	(Italy) Lorenzo Dalla Porta	Honda	27	+10.027	15	3
14	8	(Italy) Nicolò Bulega	KTM	27	+10.360	25	2
15	22	(Japan) Kazuki Masaki	KTM	27	+10.467	22	1
16	23	(Italy) Niccolò Antonelli	Honda	27	+11.514	19	
17	14	(Italy) Tony Arbolino	Honda	27	+11.712	6	
18	27	(Japan) Kaito Toba	Honda	27	+20.039	23	
19	10	(Italy) Dennis Foggia	KTM	27	+31.237	30 (Note: Back of the grid start penalty.)	
20	43	(Germany) Luca Grünwald	KTM	27	+32.768	26	
21	81	(Italy) Stefano Nepa	KTM	27	+41.058	29	
Ret	19	(Argentina) Gabriel Rodrigo	KTM	24	Collision	12	
Ret	32	(Japan) Ai Ogura	Honda	24	Collision	18	
Ret	33	(Italy) Enea Bastianini	Honda	22	Collision	3	
Ret	72	(Spain) Alonso López	Honda	22	Collision	20	
Ret	75	(Spain) Albert Arenas	KTM	20	Accident	11	
Ret	77	(Spain) Vicente Pérez	KTM	18	Electrics	27	
Ret	41	(Thailand) Nakarin Atiratphuvapat	Honda	16	Accident	28	
Ret	21	(Italy) Fabio Di Giannantonio	Honda	15	Collision	10	
Ret	24	(Japan) Tatsuki Suzuki	Honda	5	Accident	14	
OFFICIAL MOTO3 REPORT

== Championship standings after the race ==
=== MotoGP ===
Pos.	Rider	Points
1	(Spain) Marc Márquez	165
2	(Italy) Valentino Rossi	119
3	(Spain) Maverick Viñales	109
4	(Italy) Andrea Dovizioso	88
5	(France) Johann Zarco	88
6	(Spain) Jorge Lorenzo	85
7	(Italy) Danilo Petrucci	84
8	(United Kingdom) Cal Crutchlow	79
9	(Italy) Andrea Iannone	75
10	(Australia) Jack Miller	57

=== Moto2 ===
Pos.	Rider	Points
1	(Italy) Francesco Bagnaia	148
2	(Portugal) Miguel Oliveira	141
3	(Spain) Álex Márquez	113
4	(Spain) Joan Mir	95
5	(Italy) Lorenzo Baldassarri	93
6	(South Africa) Brad Binder	91
7	(Spain) Xavi Vierge	79
8	(Germany) Marcel Schrötter	73
9	(France) Fabio Quartararo	72
10	(Italy) Mattia Pasini	63

=== Moto3 ===
Pos.	Rider	Points
1	(Spain) Jorge Martín	130
2	(Italy) Marco Bezzecchi	123
3	(Spain) Arón Canet	92
4	(Italy) Fabio Di Giannantonio	91
5	(Italy) Enea Bastianini	84
6	(Argentina) Gabriel Rodrigo	65
7	(Czech Republic) Jakub Kornfeil	61
8	(Italy) Andrea Migno	60
9	(Spain) Marcos Ramírez	57
10	(Italy) Lorenzo Dalla Porta	46

== Notes ==
Previous race: 2018 Dutch TT	FIM Grand Prix World Championship; 2018 season	Next race: 2018 Czech Republic Grand Prix
Previous race: 2017 German Grand Prix	German motorcycle Grand Prix	Next race: 2019 German Grand Prix
