= 2018 Czech Republic motorcycle Grand Prix =

2018 Czech Republic Grand Prix
Race details
- Race 10 of 19 races in the 2018 Grand Prix motorcycle racing season
- Date: 5 August 2018
- Official name: Monster Energy Grand Prix České republiky
- Location: Brno Circuit, Brno, Czech Republic
- Course: Permanent racing facility; 5.403 km (3.357 mi)

MotoGP
Pole position
Rider	(Italy) Andrea Dovizioso	Ducati
Time	1:54.689	
Fastest lap
Rider	(Spain) Jorge Lorenzo	Ducati
Time	1:56.640 on lap 21	
Podium
First	(Italy) Andrea Dovizioso	Ducati
Second	(Spain) Jorge Lorenzo	Ducati
Third	(Spain) Marc Márquez	Honda

Moto2
Pole position
Rider	(Italy) Luca Marini	Kalex
Time	2:02.244	
Fastest lap
Rider	(Spain) Xavi Vierge	Kalex
Time	2:03.103 on lap 4	
Podium
First	(Portugal) Miguel Oliveira	KTM
Second	(Italy) Luca Marini	Kalex
Third	(Italy) Francesco Bagnaia	Kalex

Moto3
Pole position
Rider	(Czech Republic) Jakub Kornfeil	KTM
Time	2:07.981	
Fastest lap
Rider	(Spain) Arón Canet	Honda
Time	2:08.480 on lap 2	
Podium
First	(Italy) Fabio Di Giannantonio	Honda
Second	(Spain) Arón Canet	Honda
Third	(Czech Republic) Jakub Kornfeil	KTM

The 2018 Czech Republic motorcycle Grand Prix was the tenth round of the 2018 MotoGP season. It was held at the Brno Circuit in Brno on 5 August 2018. Fabio Di Giannantonio took his first career victory in the Moto3 race.

== Classification ==
=== MotoGP ===
Pos.	No.	Rider	Team	Manufacturer	Laps	Time/Retired	Grid	Points
1	4	(Italy) Andrea Dovizioso	Ducati Team	Ducati	21	41:07.728	1	25
2	99	(Spain) Jorge Lorenzo	Ducati Team	Ducati	21	+0.178	4	20
3	93	(Spain) Marc Márquez	Repsol Honda Team	Honda	21	+0.368	3	16
4	46	(Italy) Valentino Rossi	Movistar Yamaha MotoGP	Yamaha	21	+2.902	2	13
5	35	(United Kingdom) Cal Crutchlow	LCR Honda Castrol	Honda	21	+2.958	5	11
6	9	(Italy) Danilo Petrucci	Alma Pramac Racing	Ducati	21	+3.768	6	10
7	5	(France) Johann Zarco	Monster Yamaha Tech 3	Yamaha	21	+6.159	7	9
8	26	(Spain) Dani Pedrosa	Repsol Honda Team	Honda	21	+7.479	10	8
9	19	(Spain) Álvaro Bautista	Ángel Nieto Team	Ducati	21	+7.575	14	7
10	29	(Italy) Andrea Iannone	Team Suzuki Ecstar	Suzuki	21	+8.326	8	6
11	42	(Spain) Álex Rins	Team Suzuki Ecstar	Suzuki	21	+8.653	9	5
12	43	(Australia) Jack Miller	Alma Pramac Racing	Ducati	21	+16.549	17	4
13	21	(Italy) Franco Morbidelli	EG 0,0 Marc VDS	Honda	21	+19.603	13	3
14	55	(Malaysia) Hafizh Syahrin	Monster Yamaha Tech 3	Yamaha	21	+21.381	16	2
15	41	(Spain) Aleix Espargaró	Aprilia Racing Team Gresini	Aprilia	21	+23.159	23	1
16	12	(Switzerland) Thomas Lüthi	EG 0,0 Marc VDS	Honda	21	+27.673	21	
17	30	(Japan) Takaaki Nakagami	LCR Honda Idemitsu	Honda	21	+28.311	19	
18	17	(Czech Republic) Karel Abraham	Ángel Nieto Team	Ducati	21	+41.172	22	
19	50	(France) Sylvain Guintoli	Team Suzuki Ecstar	Suzuki	21	+42.411	20	
20	10	(Belgium) Xavier Siméon	Reale Avintia Racing	Ducati	21	+50.941	25	
Ret	53	(Spain) Tito Rabat	Reale Avintia Racing	Ducati	8	Exhaust	11	
Ret	45	(United Kingdom) Scott Redding	Aprilia Racing Team Gresini	Aprilia	5	Accident	24	
Ret	38	(United Kingdom) Bradley Smith	Red Bull KTM Factory Racing	KTM	1	Collision Damage	15	
Ret	25	(Spain) Maverick Viñales	Movistar Yamaha MotoGP	Yamaha	0	Collision	12	
Ret	6	(Germany) Stefan Bradl	HRC Honda Team	Honda	0	Collision	18	
DNS	44	(Spain) Pol Espargaró	Red Bull KTM Factory Racing	KTM		Did not start		

- Pol Espargaró suffered a broken collarbone in a crash during Sunday warm-up session and was declared unfit to start the race.

=== Moto2 ===
Pos.	No.	Rider	Manufacturer	Laps	Time/Retired	Grid	Points
1	44	(Portugal) Miguel Oliveira	KTM	19	39:22.324	4	25
2	10	(Italy) Luca Marini	Kalex	19	+0.070	1	20
3	42	(Italy) Francesco Bagnaia	Kalex	19	+0.525	6	16
4	7	(Italy) Lorenzo Baldassarri	Kalex	19	+0.745	10	13
5	97	(Spain) Xavi Vierge	Kalex	19	+3.362	8	11
6	41	(South Africa) Brad Binder	KTM	19	+3.643	7	10
7	23	(Germany) Marcel Schrötter	Kalex	19	+3.694	5	9
8	9	(Spain) Jorge Navarro	Kalex	19	+3.728	11	8
9	22	(United Kingdom) Sam Lowes	KTM	19	+4.038	22	7
10	54	(Italy) Mattia Pasini	Kalex	19	+5.030	3	6
11	20	(France) Fabio Quartararo	Speed Up	19	+5.153	14	5
12	40	(Spain) Augusto Fernández	Kalex	19	+5.839	21	4
13	27	(Spain) Iker Lecuona	KTM	19	+6.857	13	3
14	5	(Italy) Andrea Locatelli	Kalex	19	+9.473	15	2
15	24	(Italy) Simone Corsi	Kalex	19	+10.054	16	1
16	45	(Japan) Tetsuta Nagashima	Kalex	19	+10.626	25	
17	77	(Switzerland) Dominique Aegerter	KTM	19	+10.658	9	
18	16	(United States) Joe Roberts	NTS	19	+18.136	23	
19	4	(South Africa) Steven Odendaal	NTS	19	+19.040	26	
20	89	(Malaysia) Khairul Idham Pawi	Kalex	19	+21.334	20	
21	66	(Finland) Niki Tuuli	Kalex	19	+28.078	28	
22	95	(France) Jules Danilo	Kalex	19	+34.570	30	
23	51	(Brazil) Eric Granado	Suter	19	+45.169	33	
24	12	(Portugal) Sheridan Morais	Kalex	19	+1:08.853	29	
Ret	52	(United Kingdom) Danny Kent	Speed Up	11	Accident	24	
Ret	73	(Spain) Álex Márquez	Kalex	8	Accident	2	
Ret	13	(Italy) Romano Fenati	Kalex	7	Retired	17	
Ret	62	(Italy) Stefano Manzi	Suter	5	Accident	27	
Ret	18	(Andorra) Xavi Cardelús	Kalex	2	Accident	31	
Ret	55	(Spain) Alejandro Medina	Kalex	1	Accident	32	
Ret	36	(Spain) Joan Mir	Kalex	0	Collision	12	
Ret	64	(Netherlands) Bo Bendsneyder	Tech 3	0	Collision	18	
Ret	87	(Australia) Remy Gardner	Tech 3	0	Collision	19	
OFFICIAL MOTO2 REPORT

=== Moto3 ===
Pos.	No.	Rider	Manufacturer	Laps	Time/Retired	Grid	Points
1	21	(Italy) Fabio Di Giannantonio	Honda	18	39:09.124	5	25
2	44	(Spain) Arón Canet	Honda	18	+0.112	6	20
3	84	(Czech Republic) Jakub Kornfeil	KTM	18	+0.339	1	16
4	33	(Italy) Enea Bastianini	Honda	18	+0.560	10	13
5	19	(Argentina) Gabriel Rodrigo	KTM	18	+0.771	7	11
6	12	(Italy) Marco Bezzecchi	KTM	18	+0.896	14	10
7	42	(Spain) Marcos Ramírez	KTM	18	+1.030	3	9
8	65	(Germany) Philipp Öttl	KTM	18	+1.097	4	8
9	75	(Spain) Albert Arenas	KTM	18	+2.034	15	7
10	48	(Italy) Lorenzo Dalla Porta	Honda	18	+2.056	17	6
11	23	(Italy) Niccolò Antonelli	Honda	18	+2.093	9	5
12	10	(Italy) Dennis Foggia	KTM	18	+2.359	13	4
13	22	(Japan) Kazuki Masaki	KTM	18	+2.517	12	3
14	24	(Japan) Tatsuki Suzuki	Honda	18	+2.616	28	2
15	14	(Italy) Tony Arbolino	Honda	18	+2.770	16	1
16	41	(Thailand) Nakarin Atiratphuvapat	Honda	18	+3.674	8	
17	5	(Spain) Jaume Masiá	KTM	18	+4.618	11	
18	72	(Spain) Alonso López	Honda	18	+4.870	25	
19	8	(Italy) Nicolò Bulega	KTM	18	+4.942	18	
20	16	(Italy) Andrea Migno	KTM	18	+4.954	22	
21	77	(Spain) Vicente Pérez	KTM	18	+12.923	24	
22	71	(Japan) Ayumu Sasaki	Honda	18	+12.942	27	
23	40	(South Africa) Darryn Binder	KTM	18	+12.956	19	
24	15	(Czech Republic) Filip Salač	KTM	18	+41.511	26	
Ret	7	(Malaysia) Adam Norrodin	Honda	17	Accident	21	
Ret	81	(Italy) Stefano Nepa	KTM	14	Retired	23	
Ret	17	(United Kingdom) John McPhee	KTM	9	Accident	2	
Ret	27	(Japan) Kaito Toba	Honda	2	Accident	20	
DNS	88	(Spain) Jorge Martín	Honda		Did not start		
OFFICIAL MOTO3 REPORT

- Jorge Martín suffered a broken hand in a crash during practice and withdrew from the event.

== Championship standings after the race ==
=== MotoGP ===
Pos.	Rider	Points
1	(Spain) Marc Márquez	181
2	(Italy) Valentino Rossi	132
3	(Italy) Andrea Dovizioso	113
4	(Spain) Maverick Viñales	109
5	(Spain) Jorge Lorenzo	105
6	(France) Johann Zarco	97
7	(Italy) Danilo Petrucci	94
8	(United Kingdom) Cal Crutchlow	90
9	(Italy) Andrea Iannone	81
10	(Australia) Jack Miller	61

=== Moto2 ===
Pos.	Rider	Points
1	(Portugal) Miguel Oliveira	166
2	(Italy) Francesco Bagnaia	164
3	(Spain) Álex Márquez	113
4	(Italy) Lorenzo Baldassarri	106
5	(South Africa) Brad Binder	101
6	(Spain) Joan Mir	95
7	(Spain) Xavi Vierge	90
8	(Germany) Marcel Schrötter	82
9	(France) Fabio Quartararo	77
10	(Italy) Mattia Pasini	69

=== Moto3 ===
Pos.	Rider	Points
1	(Italy) Marco Bezzecchi	133
2	(Spain) Jorge Martín	130
3	(Italy) Fabio Di Giannantonio	116
4	(Spain) Arón Canet	112
5	(Italy) Enea Bastianini	97
6	(Czech Republic) Jakub Kornfeil	77
7	(Argentina) Gabriel Rodrigo	76
8	(Spain) Marcos Ramírez	66
9	(Italy) Andrea Migno	60
10	(Germany) Philipp Öttl	52

Previous race: 2018 German Grand Prix	FIM Grand Prix World Championship; 2018 season	Next race: 2018 Austrian Grand Prix
Previous race: 2017 Czech Republic Grand Prix	Czech Republic motorcycle Grand Prix	Next race: 2019 Czech Republic Grand Prix
