= Simone Mazzola =

Italian motorcycle racer

- Nationality: Italian
- Born: 22 April 1996 (age 30); Rome, Italy
- Current team: ProGP
- Bike number: 51
Motorcycle racing career statistics
Moto3 World Championship
Active years	2014
Manufacturers	FTR Honda
Championships	0
2014 championship position	NC (0 pts)
Starts / Wins / Podiums / Poles / F. laps / Points; 1 / 0 / 0 / 0 / 0 / 0

Simone Mazzola (born 22 April 1996 in Rome) is an Italian motorcycle racer. He currently races in the CIV Supersport 300 Championship aboard a Yamaha YZF-R3.

Mazzola suffered a crash during training for the Supersport 300 class race on the Italian championship at the Misano Circuit on 19 May 2017, resulting on severe spinal injuries. Condition was listed as "serious" as Mazzola recovered on a room besides Nicky Hayden.

== Career statistics ==
=== Grand Prix motorcycle racing ===
==== By season ====
Season	Class	Motorcycle	Team	Race	Win	Podium	Pole	FLap	Pts	Plcd
2014	Moto3	FTR Honda	MT Racing Honda	1	0	0	0	0	0	NC
Total				1	0	0	0	0	0	

==== Races by year ====
Year	Class	Bike	1	2	3	4	5	6	7	8	9	10	11	12	13	14	15	16	17	18	Pos.	Pts
2014	Moto3	FTR Honda	QAT	AME	ARG	SPA	FRA	ITA; 24	CAT	NED	GER	INP	CZE	GBR	RSM	ARA	JPN	AUS	MAL	VAL	NC	0
