= List of Grand Prix motorcycle racers: M =

Name	Seasons	World Championships	MotoGP Wins	500cc Wins	350cc Wins	Moto2 Wins	250cc Wins	Moto3 Wins	125cc Wins	80cc Wins	50cc Wins	MotoE Wins
(United Kingdom) Niall Mackenzie	1984-1995	0	0	0	0	0	0	0	0	0	0	0
(United Kingdom) Taylor Mackenzie	2010-2011	0	0	0	0	0	0	0	0	0	0	0
(Australia) Kevin Magee	1987-1991, 1993	0	0	1	0	0	0	0	0	0	0	0
(Italy) Renato Magi	1949	0	0	0	0	0	0	0	0	0	0	0
(France) Lucas Mahias	2013-2015, 2019	0	0	0	0	0	0	0	0	0	0	0
(United States) Randy Mamola	1979-1990, 1992	0	0	13	0	0	0	0	0	0	0	0
(Japan) Tomomi Manako	1994-1999	0	0	0	0	0	0	0	6	0	0	0
(Italy) Kevin Manfredi	2022-2024	0	0	0	0	0	0	0	0	0	0	0
(Germany) Anton Mang	1975-1988	5; 350cc - 1981-1982; 250cc - 1980-1981, 1987	0	0	8	0	33	0	1	0	0	0
(Italy) Andrea Mantovani	2021-2023	0	0	0	0	0	0	0	0	0	0	0
(Italy) Stefano Manzi	2015-2022, 2024	0	0	0	0	0	0	0	0	0	0	0
(Italy) Tommaso Marcon	2018-2021	0	0	0	0	0	0	0	0	0	0	0
(Spain) Álex Mariñelarena	2012-2013	0	0	0	0	0	0	0	0	0	0	0
(Italy) Luca Marini	2013, 2015-	0	0	0	0	6	0	0	0	0	0	0
(Spain) Álex Márquez	2012-	2 Moto2 - 2019; Moto3 - 2014	4	0	0	8	0	4	0	0	0	0
(Spain) Marc Márquez	2008-	9 MotoGP - 2013-2014, 2016-2019, 2025; Moto2 - 2012; 125cc - 2010	80	0	0	16	0	0	10	0	0	0
(Switzerland) Gyula Marsovszky	1961, 1963-1971, 1973	0	0	0	0	0	1	0	0	0	0	0
(Spain) Jorge Martín	2015-	2 MotoGP - 2024; Moto3 - 2018	9	0	0	2	0	8	0	0	0	0
(Spain) Jorge Martínez	1982-1997	4; 125cc - 1988; 80cc - 1986-1988	0	0	0	0	0	0	15	22	0	0
(France) Alexis Masbou	2003-2016	0	0	0	0	0	0	2	0	0	0	0
(Italy) Umberto Masetti	1949-1958	2; 500cc - 1950, 1952	0	6	0	0	0	0	0	0	0	0
(Spain) Jaume Masià	2017-2024	1 Moto3 - 2023	0	0	0	0	0	10	0	0	0	0
(Italy) Claudio Mastellari	1949-1958	0	0	0	0	0	0	0	0	0	0	0
(Japan) Naoki Matsudo	1997-2006	0	0	0	0	0	0	0	0	0	0	0
(Japan) Takuma Matsuyama	2021	0	0	0	0	0	0	0	0	0	0	0
(Italy) Giuseppe Matucci	1949-1951	0	0	0	0	0	0	0	0	0	0	0
(Italy) Simone Mazzola	2014	0	0	0	0	0	0	0	0	0	0	0
(Republic of Ireland) Cromie McCandless	1949, 1951-1952	0	0	2	0	0	0	0	1	0	0	0
(Australia) Garry McCoy	1992-2004, 2006	0	0	3	0	0	0	0	2	0	0	0
(United Kingdom) Bob McIntyre	1953-1955, 1957-1962	0	0	1	2	0	2	0	0	0	0	0
(United Kingdom) John McPhee	2010-2022	0	0	0	0	0	0	4	0	0	0	0
(Australia) Eric McPherson	1949-1950	0	0	0	0	0	0	0	0	0	0	0
(Northern Ireland) Jeremy McWilliams	1993-2005, 2014	0	0	0	0	0	1	0	0	0	0	0
(United Kingdom) Ronald Mead	1949-1950, 1952	0	0	0	0	0	0	0	0	0	0	0
(Spain) Alejandro Medina	2018, 2020	0	0	0	0	0	0	0	0	0	0	0
(France) Mike di Meglio	2003-2015, 2019-2020	0	0	0	0	0	0	0	5	0	0	1
(Italy) Marco Melandri	1997-2010, 2015	1; 250cc - 2002	5	0	0	0	10	0	7	0	0	0
(Netherlands) Jack Middelburg	1978-1983	0	0	2	0	0	0	0	0	0	0	0
(Italy) Andrea Migno	2013-2024	0	0	0	0	0	0	2	0	0	0	0
(Italy) Gilberto Milani	1959-1960, 1962-1969	0	0	0	0	0	0	0	0	0	0	0
(United States) Brandon Miller	2013-2015	0	0	0	0	0	0	0	0	0	0	0
(Australia) Jack Miller	2011-	0	4	0	0	0	0	6	0	0	0	0
(Republic of Ireland) Sammy Miller	1955-1958	0	0	0	0	0	0	0	0	0	0	0
(Japan) Soichiro Minamimoto	2023	0	0	0	0	0	0	0	0	0	0	0
(United Kingdom) Derek Minter	1957-1960, 1962-1965, 1967	0	0	0	0	0	1	0	0	0	0	0
(Spain) Joan Mir	2015-	2 MotoGP - 2020; Moto3 - 2017	1	0	0	0	0	11	0	0	0	0
(United Kingdom) Kevin Mitchell	1987-1994	0	0	0	0	0	0	0	0	0	0	0
(South Africa) Ruché Moodley	2025-	0	0	0	0	0	0	0	0	0	0	0
(Italy) Franco Morbidelli	2013-	1 Moto2 - 2017	3	0	0	8	0	0	0	0	0	0
(Italy) Luigi Morciano	2009-2012	0	0	0	0	0	0	0	0	0	0	0
(Brazil) Diogo Moreira	2022-	1 Moto2 - 2025	0	0	0	4	0	1	0	0	0	0
(Italy) Luca Morelli	2006	0	0	0	0	0	0	0	0	0	0	0
(Argentina) Marco Morelli	2025-	0	0	0	0	0	0	0	0	0	0	0
(Japan) Shogo Moriwaki	2010	0	0	0	0	0	0	0	0	0	0	0
(Italy) Luca Morelli	2006	0	0	0	0	0	0	0	0	0	0	0
(Italy) Alessandro Morosi	2022, 2025	0	0	0	0	0	0	0	0	0	0	0
(United Kingdom) Chas Mortimer	1969-1979, 1984	0	0	1	1	0	2	0	3	0	0	0
(Spain) Daniel Muñoz	2024-	0	0	0	0	0	0	0	0	0	0	0
(Spain) David Muñoz	2022-	0	0	0	0	0	0	3	0	0	0	0
(Italy) Stefano Musco	2006	0	0	0	0	0	0	0	0	0	0	0
(Switzerland) Benoit Musy	1949-1951	0	0	0	0	0	0	0	0	0	0	0
(Japan) Osamu Miyazaki	1991-2002	0	0	0	0	0	1	0	0	0	0	0
