= Zulfahmi Khairuddin =

Malaysian motorcycle racer

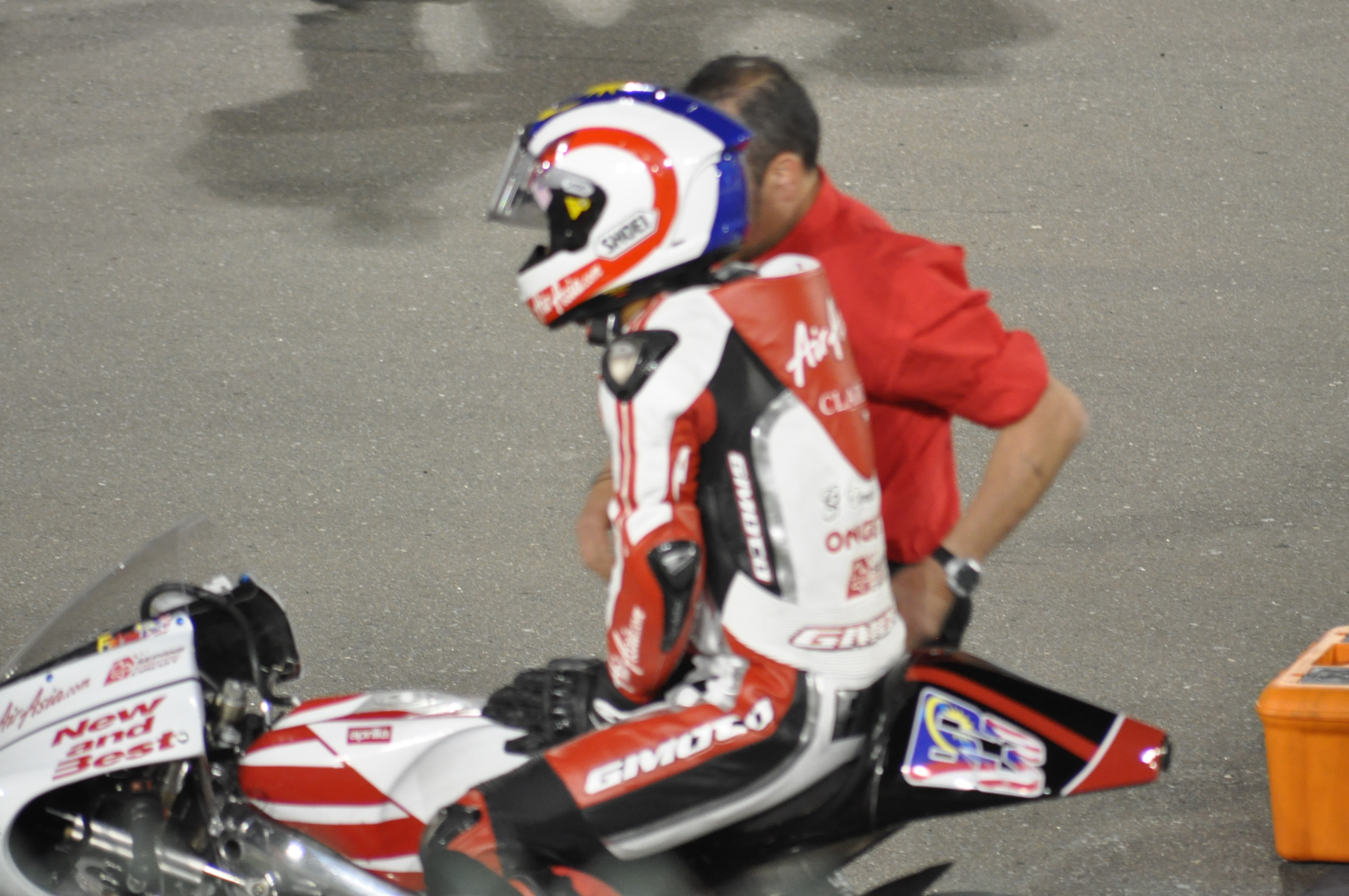
- Zulfahmi at the 2010 Qatar Grand Prix
- Nationality: Malaysian
- Born: 20 October 1991 (age 35); Banting, Selangor, Malaysia
- Current team: SIC Racing Team
- Bike number: 63
Motorcycle racing career statistics
Moto2 World Championship
Active years	2018
Manufacturers	Kalex
Championships	0
2018 championship position	45th (0 pts)
Starts / Wins / Podiums / Poles / F. laps / Points; 4 / 0 / 0 / 0 / 0 / 0
Moto3 World Championship
Active years	2012–2015
Manufacturers	KTM, Honda
Championships	0
2015 championship position	23rd (19 pts)
Starts / Wins / Podiums / Poles / F. laps / Points; 69 / 0 / 2 / 1 / 3 / 234
125cc World Championship
Active years	2009–2011
Manufacturers	Yamaha, Aprilia, Derbi
Championships	0
2010 championship position	18th (30 pts)
Starts / Wins / Podiums / Poles / F. laps / Points; 34 / 0 / 0 / 0 / 0 / 34
Supersport World Championship
Active years	2016–2017
Manufacturers	Kawasaki
Championships	0
2017 championship position	35th (6 pts)
Starts / Wins / Podiums / Poles / F. laps / Points; 24 / 0 / 1 / 0 / 0 / 62

Muhammad Zulfahmi bin Khairuddin (born 20 October 1991) is a Malaysian motorcycle racer.

== Career ==
=== 125cc World Championship ===
Born in Banting, Selangor, Malaysia, Zulfahmi made his debut in the 125cc world championship at the 2009 Malaysian Grand Prix where he finished 20th. In 2010, Zulfahmi competed in his first full season on board an Aprilia for the Air Asia-Sepang International Circuit.

=== Moto3 World Championship ===
Zulfahmi achieved his first pole position by a Malaysian rider in any class at his home race in October 2012. Zulfahmi led for most of the race, but finished second behind team-mate Sandro Cortese, after Cortese made a final-lap pass. At the end of the 2012 MotoGP campaign at Valencia, he claimed the second podium of his career; he climbed from 17th on the grid to finish third behind Danny Kent and Sandro Cortese in a dramatic thrilling race.

=== Moto2 World Championship ===
Zulfahmi briefly returned to Grand Prix racing, but after a poor start to the 2018 season, he decided to retire from racing.

== Career statistics ==
=== Grand Prix motorcycle racing ===
==== By season ====
Season	Class	Motorcycle	Team	Race	Win	Podium	Pole	FLap	Pts	Plcd
2009	125cc	Yamaha	Air Asia Team Malaysia	1	0	0	0	0	0	NC
2010	125cc	Aprilia	AirAsia–Sepang Int. Circuit	16	0	0	0	0	4	24th
2011	125cc	Derbi	Airasia–Sic–Ajo	17	0	0	0	0	30	18th
2012	Moto3	KTM	AirAsia–Sic–Ajo	17	0	2	1	3	128	7th
2013	Moto3	KTM	Red Bull KTM Ajo	16	0	0	0	0	68	12th
2014	Moto3	Honda	Ongetta–AirAsia	18	0	0	0	0	19	20th
2015	Moto3	KTM	Drive M7 SIC	18	0	0	0	0	19	23rd
2018	Moto2	Kalex	SIC Racing Team	4	0	0	0	0	0	45th
Total				**107**	**0**	**2**	**1**	**3**	**268**	

==== By class ====
Class	Seasons	1st GP	1st Pod	1st Win	Race	Win	Podiums	Pole	FLap	Pts	WChmp
125cc	2009–2011	2009 Malaysia			34	0	0	0	0	34	0
Moto3	2012–2015	2012 Qatar	2012 Malaysia		69	0	2	1	3	234	0
Moto2	2018	2018 Qatar			4	0	0	0	0	0	0

==== Races by year ====
(key) (Races in bold indicate pole position; races in italics indicate fastest lap)

Year	Class	Bike	1	2	3	4	5	6	7	8	9	10	11	12	13	14	15	16	17	18	19	Pos	Pts
2009	125cc	Yamaha	QAT	JPN	SPA	FRA	ITA	CAT	NED	GER	GBR	CZE	INP	RSM	POR	AUS	MAL; 20	VAL				NC	0
2010	125cc	Aprilia	QAT; 21	SPA; 20	FRA; 25	ITA; 21	GBR; Ret	NED; 22	CAT; 15	GER; 15	CZE; 15	INP; Ret	RSM; Ret	ARA; 16	JPN; 19	MAL; 16	AUS; DNQ	POR; 15	VAL; 20			24th	4
2011	125cc	Derbi	QAT; 19	SPA; 10	POR; 11	FRA; 19	CAT; Ret	GBR; 18	NED; 14	ITA; 18	GER; 24	CZE; 9	INP; 19	RSM; 27	ARA; Ret	JPN; 15	AUS; 20	MAL; 7	VAL; 25			18th	30
2012	Moto3	KTM	QAT; 6	SPA; 10	POR; 4	FRA; Ret	CAT; 8	GBR; 9	NED; 11	GER; 6	ITA; 9	INP; 6	CZE; Ret	RSM; 11	ARA; Ret	JPN; 5	**MAL**; 2	AUS; Ret	VAL; 3			7th	128
2013	Moto3	KTM	QAT; 6	AME; 7	SPA; 7	FRA; Ret	ITA; 11	CAT; 9	NED; 17	GER; 16	INP; 7	CZE; 15	GBR; 20	RSM; 6	ARA; Ret	MAL; DNS	AUS; 11	JPN; Ret	VAL; 13			12th	68
2014	Moto3	Honda	QAT; 18	AME; 17	ARG; 15	SPA; 20	FRA; 11	ITA; 11	CAT; 16	NED; 14	GER; Ret	INP; 15	CZE; 22	GBR; 18	RSM; 14	ARA; 15	JPN; 14	AUS; Ret	MAL; Ret	VAL; 19		20th	19
2015	Moto3	KTM	QAT; 28	AME; 20	ARG; 20	SPA; 26	FRA; 14	ITA; 26	CAT; 24	NED; Ret	GER; 19	INP; 25	CZE; 22	GBR; 14	RSM; Ret	ARA; Ret	JPN; 5	AUS; 12	MAL; Ret	VAL; 17		23rd	19
2018	Moto2	Kalex	QAT; 28	ARG; 26	AME; 27	SPA; Ret	FRA	ITA	CAT	NED	GER	CZE	AUT	GBR	RSM	ARA	THA	JPN	AUS	MAL	VAL	45th	0

=== Supersport World Championship ===
==== Races by year ====
(key) (Races in bold indicate pole position; races in italics indicate fastest lap)

Year	Bike	1	2	3	4	5	6	7	8	9	10	11	12	Pos	Pts
2016	Kawasaki	AUS; 13	THA; 7	SPA; 8	NED; 20	ITA; 25	MAL; 2	GBR; 20	ITA; Ret	GER; 22	FRA; 10	SPA; 15	QAT; 7	11th	56
2017	Kawasaki	AUS; 12	THA; Ret	SPA; 14	NED; Ret	ITA; Ret	GBR; 20	ITA; Ret	GER; 19	POR; 17	FRA; 19	SPA; 19	QAT; 19	35th	6
