= Gabriel Ramos (motorcyclist) =

Venezuelan motorcycle racer (born 1994)

- Nationality: Venezuelan
- Born: Maracay, Aragua, Venezuela
Motorcycle racing career statistics
Moto3 World Championship
Active years	2014
Manufacturers	Kalex KTM
Championships	0
2014 championship position	NC (0 pts)
Starts / Wins / Podiums / Poles / F. laps / Points; 18 / 0 / 0 / 0 / 0 / 0

Gabriel Ramos (born September 14, 1994) is a Venezuelan motorcycle racer. He was born in Maracay, Venezuela.

== Career statistics ==
=== FIM CEV Moto3 Championship ===
==== Races by year ====
(key) (Races in bold indicate pole position; races in italics indicate fastest lap)

Year	Bike	1	2	3	4	5	6	7	8	9	Pos	Pts
2012	Honda	JER; Ret	NAV; 17	ARA; 20	CAT; 24	ALB1; 15	ALB2; Ret	VAL; 25			31st	1
2013	Honda	CAT1; Ret	CAT2; Ret	ARA; 11	ALB1; 5	ALB2; Ret	NAV; 14	VAL1; 35	VAL1; 8	JER; 11	14th	31

=== Grand Prix motorcycle racing ===
==== By season ====
Season	Class	Motorcycle	Race	Win	Podium	Pole	FLap	Pts	Plcd
2014	Moto3	Kalex KTM	18	0	0	0	0	0	NC
Total			**18**	**0**	**0**	**0**	**0**	**0**	

==== Races by year ====
Year	Class	Bike	1	2	3	4	5	6	7	8	9	10	11	12	13	14	15	16	17	18	Pos.	Pts
2014	Moto3	Kalex KTM	QAT; Ret	AME; Ret	ARG; 26	SPA; 28	FRA; 24	ITA; 26	CAT; 31	NED; 27	GER; Ret	INP; Ret	CZE; 29	GBR; 28	RSM; 28	ARA; 21	JPN; 22	AUS; 27	MAL; 19	VAL; 24	NC	0
