= 2014 Italian motorcycle Grand Prix =

Sixth round of the 2014 MotoGP season

(Italy) 2014 Italian Grand Prix
Race details
- Race 6 of 18 races in the 2014 Grand Prix motorcycle racing season
- Date: 1 June 2014
- Official name: Gran Premio d'Italia TIM
- Location: Mugello Circuit
- Course: Permanent racing facility; 5.245 km (3.259 mi)

MotoGP
Pole position
Rider	(Spain) Marc Márquez	Honda
Time	1:47.270	
Fastest lap
Rider	(Spain) Marc Márquez	Honda
Time	1:47.892 on lap 5	
Podium
First	(Spain) Marc Márquez	Honda
Second	(Spain) Jorge Lorenzo	Yamaha
Third	(Italy) Valentino Rossi	Yamaha

Moto2
Pole position
Rider	(Spain) Esteve Rabat	Kalex
Time	1:52.718	
Fastest lap
Rider	(Spain) Esteve Rabat	Kalex
Time	1:52.587 on lap 19	
Podium
First	(Spain) Esteve Rabat	Kalex
Second	(Spain) Luis Salom	Kalex
Third	(Germany) Jonas Folger	Kalex

Moto3
Pole position
Rider	(Spain) Álex Rins	Honda
Time	1:56.999	
Fastest lap
Rider	(Spain) Efrén Vázquez	Honda
Time	1:57.633 on lap 3	
Podium
First	(Italy) Romano Fenati	KTM
Second	(Spain) Isaac Viñales	KTM
Third	(Spain) Álex Rins	Honda

The 2014 Italian motorcycle Grand Prix was the sixth round of the 2014 MotoGP season. It was held at the Mugello Circuit in Scarperia on 1 June 2014.

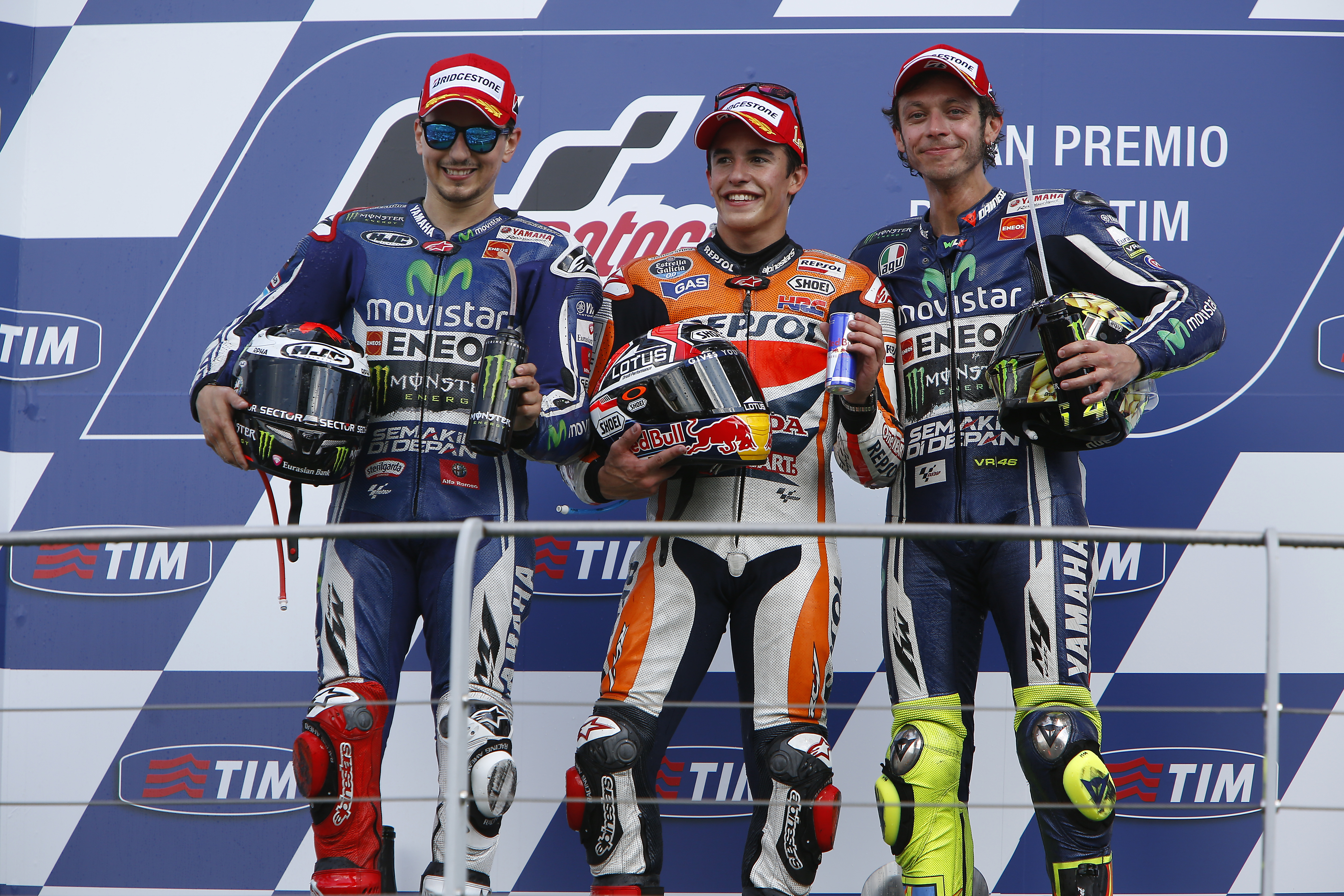
Jorge Lorenzo, Marc Márquez and Valentino Rossi, celebrating on the podium after finishing second, first and third at the MotoGP race.

== Classification ==
=== MotoGP ===
Pos.	No.	Rider	Team	Manufacturer	Laps	Time/Retired	Grid	Points
1	93	(Spain) Marc Márquez	Repsol Honda Team	Honda	23	41:38.254	1	25
2	99	(Spain) Jorge Lorenzo	Movistar Yamaha MotoGP	Yamaha	23	+0.121	3	20
3	46	(Italy) Valentino Rossi	Movistar Yamaha MotoGP	Yamaha	23	+2.688	10	16
4	26	(Spain) Dani Pedrosa	Repsol Honda Team	Honda	23	+14.046	4	13
5	44	(Spain) Pol Espargaró	Monster Yamaha Tech 3	Yamaha	23	+15.603	5	11
6	4	(Italy) Andrea Dovizioso	Ducati Team	Ducati	23	+17.042	8	10
7	29	(Italy) Andrea Iannone	Pramac Racing	Ducati	23	+17.129	2	9
8	19	(Spain) Álvaro Bautista	Go&Fun Honda Gresini	Honda	23	+27.407	11	8
9	41	(Spain) Aleix Espargaró	NGM Forward Racing	Forward Yamaha	23	+41.886	12	7
10	68	(Colombia) Yonny Hernández	Energy T.I. Pramac Racing	Ducati	23	+45.212	13	6
11	51	(Italy) Michele Pirro	Ducati Team	Ducati	23	+45.433	15	5
12	17	(Czech Republic) Karel Abraham	Cardion AB Motoracing	Honda	23	+45.831	16	4
13	45	(United Kingdom) Scott Redding	Go&Fun Honda Gresini	Honda	23	+45.839	14	3
14	7	(Japan) Hiroshi Aoyama	Drive M7 Aspar	Honda	23	+46.834	17	2
15	5	(United States) Colin Edwards	NGM Forward Racing	Forward Yamaha	23	+1:09.554	18	1
16	70	(United Kingdom) Michael Laverty	Paul Bird Motorsport	PBM	23	+1:17.789	20	
17	23	(Australia) Broc Parkes	Paul Bird Motorsport	PBM	23	+1:35.031	22	
18	63	(France) Mike Di Meglio	Avintia Racing	Avintia	23	+1:37.501	21	
Ret	8	(Spain) Héctor Barberá	Avintia Racing	Avintia	7	Retirement	19	
Ret	84	(Italy) Michel Fabrizio	Octo IodaRacing Team	ART	6	Retirement	23	
Ret	35	(United Kingdom) Cal Crutchlow	Ducati Team	Ducati	3	Accident	6	
Ret	6	(Germany) Stefan Bradl	LCR Honda MotoGP	Honda	3	Accident	9	
Ret	38	(United Kingdom) Bradley Smith	Monster Yamaha Tech 3	Yamaha	2	Accident	7	
DNS	69	(United States) Nicky Hayden	Drive M7 Aspar	Honda		Did not start		
DNS	9	(Italy) Danilo Petrucci	IodaRacing Project	ART		Did not start		

=== Moto2 ===
Pos.	No.	Rider	Manufacturer	Laps	Time/Retired	Grid	Points
1	53	(Spain) Esteve Rabat	Kalex	21	39:45.660	1	25
2	39	(Spain) Luis Salom	Kalex	21	+0.248	6	20
3	94	(Germany) Jonas Folger	Kalex	21	+3.600	4	16
4	3	(Italy) Simone Corsi	Kalex	21	+8.117	22	13
5	77	(Switzerland) Dominique Aegerter	Suter	21	+8.124	5	11
6	36	(Finland) Mika Kallio	Kalex	21	+8.214	11	10
7	5	(France) Johann Zarco	Caterham Suter	21	+8.781	12	9
8	22	(United Kingdom) Sam Lowes	Speed Up	21	+10.575	2	8
9	40	(Spain) Maverick Viñales	Kalex	21	+10.912	16	7
10	21	(Italy) Franco Morbidelli	Kalex	21	+16.251	8	6
11	81	(Spain) Jordi Torres	Suter	21	+16.297	7	5
12	23	(Germany) Marcel Schrötter	Tech 3	21	+16.642	10	4
13	11	(Germany) Sandro Cortese	Kalex	21	+17.805	3	3
14	19	(Belgium) Xavier Siméon	Suter	21	+20.340	17	2
15	49	(Spain) Axel Pons	Kalex	21	+20.945	14	1
16	30	(Japan) Takaaki Nakagami	Kalex	21	+25.070	15	
17	15	(San Marino) Alex de Angelis	Suter	21	+38.473	30	
18	95	(Australia) Anthony West	Speed Up	21	+38.503	29	
19	88	(Spain) Ricard Cardús	Tech 3	21	+38.737	19	
20	96	(France) Louis Rossi	Kalex	21	+39.112	24	
21	8	(United Kingdom) Gino Rea	Suter	21	+40.424	28	
22	60	(Spain) Julián Simón	Kalex	21	+40.474	20	
23	7	(Italy) Lorenzo Baldassarri	Suter	21	+41.059	23	
24	18	(Spain) Nicolás Terol	Suter	21	+42.977	18	
25	55	(Malaysia) Hafizh Syahrin	Kalex	21	+43.011	25	
26	4	(Switzerland) Randy Krummenacher	Suter	21	+50.254	21	
27	25	(Malaysia) Azlan Shah	Kalex	21	+1:04.480	32	
28	45	(Japan) Tetsuta Nagashima	TSR	21	+1:04.545	27	
29	97	(Spain) Román Ramos	Speed Up	21	+1:04.818	33	
30	70	(Switzerland) Robin Mulhauser	Suter	21	+1:04.930	31	
31	10	(Thailand) Thitipong Warokorn	Kalex	21	+1:22.863	34	
Ret	54	(Italy) Mattia Pasini	Kalex	8	Accident	13	
Ret	12	(Switzerland) Thomas Lüthi	Suter	4	Accident	9	
Ret	2	(United States) Josh Herrin	Caterham Suter	0	Accident	26	
OFFICIAL MOTO2 REPORT

=== Moto3 ===
Pos.	No.	Rider	Manufacturer	Laps	Time/Retired	Grid	Points
1	5	(Italy) Romano Fenati	KTM	20	39:46.256	4	25
2	32	(Spain) Isaac Viñales	KTM	20	+0.01	12	20
3	42	(Spain) Álex Rins	Honda	20	+0.0108	1	16
4	44	(Portugal) Miguel Oliveira	Mahindra	20	+0.121	19	13
5	31	(Finland) Niklas Ajo	Husqvarna	20	+0.260	15	11
6	10	(France) Alexis Masbou	Honda	20	+0.359	5	10
7	19	(Italy) Alessandro Tonucci	Mahindra	20	+0.597	14	9
8	58	(Spain) Juan Francisco Guevara	Kalex KTM	20	+5.230	8	8
9	41	(South Africa) Brad Binder	Mahindra	20	+5.353	9	7
10	98	(Czech Republic) Karel Hanika	KTM	20	+5.395	7	6
11	63	(Malaysia) Zulfahmi Khairuddin	Honda	20	+18.618	18	5
12	7	(Spain) Efrén Vázquez	Honda	20	+25.338	10	4
13	65	(Germany) Philipp Öttl	Kalex KTM	20	+25.711	25	3
14	3	(Italy) Matteo Ferrari	Mahindra	20	+25.796	22	2
15	52	(United Kingdom) Danny Kent	Husqvarna	20	+25.904	26	1
16	43	(Germany) Luca Grünwald	Kalex KTM	20	+26.005	21	
17	61	(Australia) Arthur Sissis	Mahindra	20	+27.099	24	
18	55	(Italy) Andrea Locatelli	Mahindra	20	+27.309	23	
19	11	(Belgium) Livio Loi	Kalex KTM	20	+38.450	28	
20	22	(Spain) Ana Carrasco	Kalex KTM	20	+38.516	33	
21	51	(Netherlands) Bryan Schouten	Mahindra	20	+38.584	31	
22	95	(France) Jules Danilo	Mahindra	20	+39.005	34	
23	57	(Brazil) Eric Granado	KTM	20	+39.082	29	
24	16	(Italy) Simone Mazzola	FTR Honda	20	+40.531	32	
25	69	(Italy) Anthony Groppi	FTR Honda	20	+44.742	30	
26	4	(Venezuela) Gabriel Ramos	Kalex KTM	20	+1:09.125	35	
Ret	12	(Spain) Álex Márquez	Honda	19	Accident	6	
Ret	8	(Australia) Jack Miller	KTM	19	Accident	2	
Ret	33	(Italy) Enea Bastianini	KTM	19	Accident	16	
Ret	9	(Netherlands) Scott Deroue	Kalex KTM	19	Retirement	27	
Ret	84	(Czech Republic) Jakub Kornfeil	KTM	14	Retirement	3	
Ret	21	(Italy) Francesco Bagnaia	KTM	9	Retirement	17	
Ret	17	(United Kingdom) John McPhee	Honda	6	Accident	11	
Ret	23	(Italy) Niccolò Antonelli	KTM	4	Accident	13	
Ret	38	(Malaysia) Hafiq Azmi	KTM	2	Accident	20	
OFFICIAL MOTO3 REPORT

== Championship standings after the race (MotoGP) ==
Below are the standings for the top five riders and constructors after round six has concluded.

Riders' Championship standings

Pos.	Rider	Points
1	(Spain) Marc Márquez	150
2	(Italy) Valentino Rossi	97
3	(Spain) Dani Pedrosa	96
4	(Spain) Jorge Lorenzo	65
5	(Italy) Andrea Dovizioso	63

Constructors' Championship standings

Pos.	Constructor	Points
1	(Japan) Honda	150
2	(Japan) Yamaha	107
3	(Italy) Ducati	66
4	(Switzerland) Forward Yamaha	44
5	(Italy) ART	2

- Note: Only the top five positions are included for both sets of standings.

Previous race: 2014 French Grand Prix	FIM Grand Prix World Championship; 2014 season	Next race: 2014 Catalan Grand Prix
Previous race: 2013 Italian Grand Prix	Italian motorcycle Grand Prix	Next race: 2015 Italian Grand Prix
