= 2014 San Marino and Rimini Riviera motorcycle Grand Prix =

2014 San Marino and Rimini Riviera Grand Prix
Race details
- Race 13 of 18 races in the 2014 Grand Prix motorcycle racing season
- Date: 14 September 2014
- Official name: Gran Premio TIM di San Marino e della Riviera di Rimini
- Location: Misano World Circuit Marco Simoncelli
- Course: Permanent racing facility; 4.226 km (2.626 mi)

MotoGP
Pole position
Rider	(Spain) Jorge Lorenzo	Yamaha
Time	1:33.238	
Fastest lap
Rider	(Spain) Marc Márquez	Honda
Time	1:34.108 on lap 4	
Podium
First	(Italy) Valentino Rossi	Yamaha
Second	(Spain) Jorge Lorenzo	Yamaha
Third	(Spain) Dani Pedrosa	Honda

Moto2
Pole position
Rider	(Finland) Mika Kallio	Kalex
Time	1:38.043	
Fastest lap
Rider	(Spain) Esteve Rabat	Kalex
Time	1:38.265 on lap 4	
Podium
First	(Spain) Esteve Rabat	Kalex
Second	(Finland) Mika Kallio	Kalex
Third	(France) Johann Zarco	Caterham Suter

Moto3
Pole position
Rider	(Australia) Jack Miller	KTM
Time	1:42.974	
Fastest lap
Rider	(Spain) Juan Francisco Guevara	Kalex KTM
Time	1:43.196 on lap 4	
Podium
First	(Spain) Álex Rins	Honda
Second	(Spain) Álex Márquez	Honda
Third	(Australia) Jack Miller	KTM

The 2014 San Marino and Rimini Riviera motorcycle Grand Prix was the thirteenth round of the 2014 Grand Prix motorcycle racing season. It was held at the Misano World Circuit Marco Simoncelli in Misano Adriatico on 14 September 2014.

In the premier class, Valentino Rossi took the first non-Honda win of the season, and his first victory since the 2013 Dutch TT. He finished ahead of teammate Jorge Lorenzo, and Dani Pedrosa finished in third place. The victory pushed him past the 5000 career points total, the first and so far only rider to achieve this feat. Marc Márquez crashed while battling for the race lead with Rossi; he remounted and – with a last-lap retirement for Aleix Espargaró – was able to score one championship point.

In the support categories, Moto2 championship leader Esteve Rabat took his seventh victory of 2014 – and third in succession – leading home teammate Mika Kallio for a 1–2 for the Marc VDS Racing Team, while the podium was completed by Johann Zarco. Just as in the other two classes, Estrella Galicia 0,0 achieved a 1–2 finish with riders Álex Rins and Álex Márquez; the pair were split by 0.042 seconds at the line, with Rins prevailing for his second win of 2014.

== Classification ==
=== MotoGP ===
Pos.	No.	Rider	Team	Manufacturer	Laps	Time/Retired	Grid	Points
1	46	(Italy) Valentino Rossi	Movistar Yamaha MotoGP	Yamaha	28	44:14.586	3	25
2	99	(Spain) Jorge Lorenzo	Movistar Yamaha MotoGP	Yamaha	28	+1.578	1	20
3	26	(Spain) Dani Pedrosa	Repsol Honda Team	Honda	28	+4.276	5	16
4	4	(Italy) Andrea Dovizioso	Ducati Team	Ducati	28	+5.510	6	13
5	29	(Italy) Andrea Iannone	Pramac Racing	Ducati	28	+11.771	2	11
6	44	(Spain) Pol Espargaró	Monster Yamaha Tech 3	Yamaha	28	+18.999	7	10
7	38	(United Kingdom) Bradley Smith	Monster Yamaha Tech 3	Yamaha	28	+23.100	9	9
8	19	(Spain) Álvaro Bautista	Go&Fun Honda Gresini	Honda	28	+36.458	12	8
9	35	(United Kingdom) Cal Crutchlow	Ducati Team	Ducati	28	+38.480	13	7
10	68	(Colombia) Yonny Hernández	Energy T.I. Pramac Racing	Ducati	28	+45.878	11	6
11	17	(Czech Republic) Karel Abraham	Cardion AB Motoracing	Honda	28	+54.765	17	5
12	7	(Japan) Hiroshi Aoyama	Drive M7 Aspar	Honda	28	+56.775	15	4
13	45	(United Kingdom) Scott Redding	Go&Fun Honda Gresini	Honda	28	+1:02.734	14	3
14	15	(San Marino) Alex de Angelis	NGM Forward Racing	Forward Yamaha	28	+1:13.546	19	2
15	93	(Spain) Marc Márquez	Repsol Honda Team	Honda	28	+1:15.948	4	1
16	2	(United Kingdom) Leon Camier	Drive M7 Aspar	Honda	28	+1:20.760	16	
17	70	(United Kingdom) Michael Laverty	Paul Bird Motorsport	PBM	28	+1:26.422	18	
18	23	(Australia) Broc Parkes	Paul Bird Motorsport	PBM	27	+1 lap	20	
19	8	(Spain) Héctor Barberá	Avintia Racing	Avintia	27	+1 lap	21	
Ret	41	(Spain) Aleix Espargaró	NGM Forward Racing	Forward Yamaha	27	Accident	8	
Ret	6	(Germany) Stefan Bradl	LCR Honda MotoGP	Honda	6	Accident	10	
Ret	9	(Italy) Danilo Petrucci	Octo IodaRacing Team	ART	1	Accident	23	
Ret	63	(France) Mike Di Meglio	Avintia Racing	Avintia	0	Accident	22	

=== Moto2 ===
Pos.	No.	Rider	Manufacturer	Laps	Time/Retired	Grid	Points
1	53	(Spain) Esteve Rabat	Kalex	26	42:48.724	2	25
2	36	(Finland) Mika Kallio	Kalex	26	+2.271	1	20
3	5	(France) Johann Zarco	Caterham Suter	26	+4.268	6	16
4	40	(Spain) Maverick Viñales	Kalex	26	+7.448	4	13
5	12	(Switzerland) Thomas Lüthi	Suter	26	+9.679	3	11
6	77	(Switzerland) Dominique Aegerter	Suter	26	+11.587	5	10
7	21	(Italy) Franco Morbidelli	Kalex	26	+21.899	18	9
8	60	(Spain) Julián Simón	Kalex	26	+22.403	13	8
9	49	(Spain) Axel Pons	Kalex	26	+22.744	10	7
10	30	(Japan) Takaaki Nakagami	Kalex	26	+24.044	8	6
11	23	(Germany) Marcel Schrötter	Tech 3	26	+25.711	11	5
12	11	(Germany) Sandro Cortese	Kalex	26	+29.473	14	4
13	54	(Italy) Mattia Pasini	Kalex	26	+31.929	22	3
14	4	(Switzerland) Randy Krummenacher	Suter	26	+35.067	9	2
15	39	(Spain) Luis Salom	Kalex	26	+35.294	15	1
16	19	(Belgium) Xavier Siméon	Suter	26	+37.413	17	
17	95	(Australia) Anthony West	Speed Up	26	+37.828	23	
18	22	(United Kingdom) Sam Lowes	Speed Up	26	+38.303	24	
19	94	(Germany) Jonas Folger	Kalex	26	+42.800	12	
20	55	(Malaysia) Hafizh Syahrin	Kalex	26	+42.936	25	
21	81	(Spain) Jordi Torres	Suter	26	+43.993	20	
22	8	(United Kingdom) Gino Rea	Suter	26	+44.376	28	
23	14	(Thailand) Ratthapark Wilairot	Caterham Suter	26	+50.539	29	
24	20	(France) Florian Marino	Kalex	26	+48.297 (Note: One position penalty for exceeding track limits.)	26	
25	7	(Italy) Lorenzo Baldassarri	Suter	26	+49.033	19	
26	96	(France) Louis Rossi	Kalex	26	+52.803	21	
27	97	(Spain) Román Ramos	Speed Up	26	+1:02.315	31	
28	64	(Italy) Federico Caricasulo	TSR	26	+1:02.417	34	
29	70	(Switzerland) Robin Mulhauser	Suter	26	+1:03.043	35	
30	10	(Thailand) Thitipong Warokorn	Kalex	26	+1:06.321	30	
31	32	(Italy) Federico Fuligni	Suter	26	+1:05.806	33	
32	25	(Malaysia) Azlan Shah	Kalex	25	+1 lap	27	
Ret	88	(Spain) Ricard Cardús	Tech 3	13	Retirement	7	
Ret	84	(Italy) Riccardo Russo	Suter	12	Accident	32	
Ret	18	(Spain) Nicolás Terol	Suter	10	Retirement	16	
Ret	59	(Czech Republic) Miroslav Popov	Suter	3	Accident	36	
OFFICIAL MOTO2 REPORT

=== Moto3 ===
Pos.	No.	Rider	Manufacturer	Laps	Time/Retired	Grid	Points
1	42	(Spain) Álex Rins	Honda	23	39:50.694	3	25
2	12	(Spain) Álex Márquez	Honda	23	+0.042	4	20
3	8	(Australia) Jack Miller	KTM	23	+3.403	1	16
4	32	(Spain) Isaac Viñales	KTM	23	+4.459	8	13
5	33	(Italy) Enea Bastianini	KTM	23	+4.485	17	11
6	41	(South Africa) Brad Binder	Mahindra	23	+4.671	10	10
7	10	(France) Alexis Masbou	Honda	23	+9.406	24	9
8	16	(Italy) Andrea Migno	Mahindra	23	+9.543	22	8
9	58	(Spain) Juan Francisco Guevara	Kalex KTM	23	+9.706	12	7
10	7	(Spain) Efrén Vázquez	Honda	23	+10.043	9	6
11	5	(Italy) Romano Fenati	KTM	23	+10.108	11	5
12	52	(United Kingdom) Danny Kent	Husqvarna	23	+12.552	6	4
13	17	(United Kingdom) John McPhee	Honda	23	+14.414	15	3
14	63	(Malaysia) Zulfahmi Khairuddin	Honda	23	+15.485	18	2
15	99	(Spain) Jorge Navarro	Kalex KTM	23	+16.175	13	1
16	23	(Italy) Niccolò Antonelli	KTM	23	+20.954	7	
17	84	(Czech Republic) Jakub Kornfeil	KTM	23	+22.129	16	
18	19	(Italy) Alessandro Tonucci	Mahindra	23	+22.157	21	
19	65	(Germany) Philipp Öttl	Kalex KTM	23	+37.372	29	
20	51	(Netherlands) Bryan Schouten	Mahindra	23	+42.795	30	
21	57	(Brazil) Eric Granado	KTM	23	+43.323	23	
22	44	(Portugal) Miguel Oliveira	Mahindra	23	+43.961	5	
23	38	(Malaysia) Hafiq Azmi	KTM	23	+55.212	32	
24	22	(Spain) Ana Carrasco	Kalex KTM	23	+55.269	34	
25	77	(Italy) Lorenzo Petrarca	KTM	23	+55.431	31	
26	95	(France) Jules Danilo	Mahindra	23	+55.994	27	
27	2	(Australia) Remy Gardner	Kalex KTM	23	+58.112	33	
28	4	(Venezuela) Gabriel Ramos	Kalex KTM	23	+1:06.814	35	
Ret	9	(Netherlands) Scott Deroue	Kalex KTM	19	Accident	28	
Ret	55	(Italy) Andrea Locatelli	Mahindra	18	Retirement	26	
Ret	31	(Finland) Niklas Ajo	Husqvarna	11	Retirement	2	
Ret	91	(Argentina) Gabriel Rodrigo	KTM	11	Retirement	20	
Ret	98	(Czech Republic) Karel Hanika	KTM	8	Accident	19	
Ret	21	(Italy) Francesco Bagnaia	KTM	7	Retirement	14	
Ret	3	(Italy) Matteo Ferrari	Mahindra	3	Accident	25	
OFFICIAL MOTO3 REPORT

== Championship standings after the race (MotoGP) ==
Below are the standings for the top five riders and constructors after round thirteen has concluded.

Riders' Championship standings

Pos.	Rider	Points
1	(Spain) Marc Márquez	289
2	(Spain) Dani Pedrosa	215
3	(Italy) Valentino Rossi	214
4	(Spain) Jorge Lorenzo	177
5	(Italy) Andrea Dovizioso	142

Constructors' Championship standings

Pos.	Constructor	Points
1	(Japan) Honda	316
2	(Japan) Yamaha	239
3	(Italy) Ducati	149
4	(Switzerland) Forward Yamaha	97
5	(United Kingdom) PBM	8

- Note: Only the top five positions are included for both sets of standings.

Previous race: 2014 British Grand Prix	FIM Grand Prix World Championship; 2014 season	Next race: 2014 Aragon Grand Prix
Previous race: 2013 San Marino Grand Prix	San Marino and Rimini Riviera motorcycle Grand Prix	Next race: 2015 San Marino Grand Prix
