= 2014 French motorcycle Grand Prix =

(France) 2014 French Grand Prix
Race details
- Race 5 of 18 races in the 2014 Grand Prix motorcycle racing season
- Date: 18 May 2014
- Official name: Monster Energy Grand Prix de France
- Location: Bugatti Circuit
- Course: Permanent racing facility; 4.185 km (2.600 mi)

MotoGP
Pole position
Rider	(Spain) Marc Márquez	Honda
Time	1:32.042	
Fastest lap
Rider	(Spain) Marc Márquez	Honda
Time	1:33.548 on lap 8	
Podium
First	(Spain) Marc Márquez	Honda
Second	(Italy) Valentino Rossi	Yamaha
Third	(Spain) Álvaro Bautista	Honda

Moto2
Pole position
Rider	(Germany) Jonas Folger	Kalex
Time	1:37.619	
Fastest lap
Rider	(Spain) Maverick Viñales	Kalex
Time	1:37.882 on lap 18	
Podium
First	(Finland) Mika Kallio	Kalex
Second	(Italy) Simone Corsi	Kalex
Third	(Spain) Esteve Rabat	Kalex

Moto3
Pole position
Rider	(Spain) Efrén Vázquez	Honda
Time	1:42.491	
Fastest lap
Rider	(Italy) Francesco Bagnaia	KTM
Time	1:42.636 on lap 13	
Podium
First	(Australia) Jack Miller	KTM
Second	(Spain) Álex Rins	Honda
Third	(Spain) Isaac Viñales	KTM

The 2014 French motorcycle Grand Prix was the fifth round of the 2014 MotoGP season. It was held at the Bugatti Circuit in Le Mans on 18 May 2014.

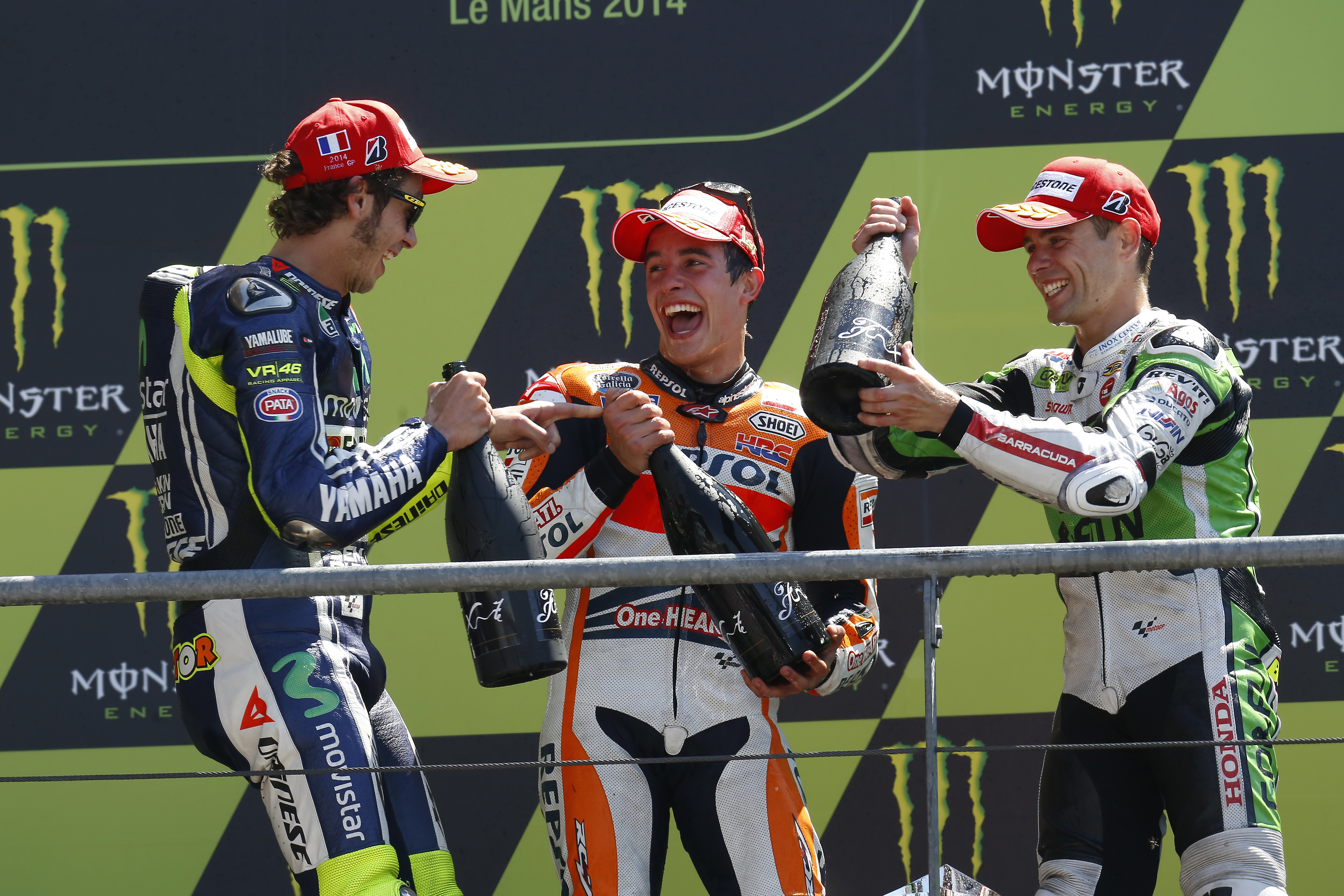
Valentino Rossi, Marc Márquez and Álvaro Bautista, toasting the champagne on the podium after finishing second, first and third in the MotoGP race.

== Classification ==
=== MotoGP ===
Pos.	No.	Rider	Team	Manufacturer	Laps	Time/Retired	Grid	Points
1	93	(Spain) Marc Márquez	Repsol Honda Team	Honda	28	44:03.925	1	25
2	46	(Italy) Valentino Rossi	Movistar Yamaha MotoGP	Yamaha	28	+1.486	5	20
3	19	(Spain) Álvaro Bautista	Go&Fun Honda Gresini	Honda	28	+3.144	7	16
4	44	(Spain) Pol Espargaró	Monster Yamaha Tech 3	Yamaha	28	+3.717	2	13
5	26	(Spain) Dani Pedrosa	Repsol Honda Team	Honda	28	+4.077	9	11
6	99	(Spain) Jorge Lorenzo	Movistar Yamaha MotoGP	Yamaha	28	+7.088	6	10
7	6	(Germany) Stefan Bradl	LCR Honda MotoGP	Honda	28	+11.527	4	9
8	4	(Italy) Andrea Dovizioso	Ducati Team	Ducati	28	+22.103	3	8
9	41	(Spain) Aleix Espargaró	NGM Forward Racing	Forward Yamaha	28	+22.626	8	7
10	38	(United Kingdom) Bradley Smith	Monster Yamaha Tech 3	Yamaha	28	+23.108	10	6
11	35	(United Kingdom) Cal Crutchlow	Ducati Team	Ducati	28	+25.780	12	5
12	45	(United Kingdom) Scott Redding	Go&Fun Honda Gresini	Honda	28	+39.523	16	4
13	68	(Colombia) Yonny Hernández	Energy T.I. Pramac Racing	Ducati	28	+42.544	14	3
14	7	(Japan) Hiroshi Aoyama	Drive M7 Aspar	Honda	28	+42.736	17	2
15	17	(Czech Republic) Karel Abraham	Cardion AB Motoracing	Honda	28	+56.644	18	1
16	70	(United Kingdom) Michael Laverty	Paul Bird Motorsport	PBM	28	+1:14.123	21	
17	5	(United States) Colin Edwards	NGM Forward Racing	Forward Yamaha	28	+1:19.723	15	
18	23	(Australia) Broc Parkes	Paul Bird Motorsport	PBM	28	+1:30.934	20	
19	63	(France) Mike Di Meglio	Avintia Racing	Avintia	28	+1:34.521	22	
Ret	29	(Italy) Andrea Iannone	Pramac Racing	Ducati	1	Accident	11	
Ret	8	(Spain) Héctor Barberá	Avintia Racing	Avintia	1	Accident	19	
Ret	69	(United States) Nicky Hayden	Drive M7 Aspar	Honda	0	Accident	13	

=== Moto2 ===
Pos.	No.	Rider	Manufacturer	Laps	Time/Retired	Grid	Points
1	36	(Finland) Mika Kallio	Kalex	26	42:41.696	4	25
2	3	(Italy) Simone Corsi	Kalex	26	+1.015	6	20
3	53	(Spain) Esteve Rabat	Kalex	26	+1.303	2	16
4	40	(Spain) Maverick Viñales	Kalex	26	+2.187	7	13
5	39	(Spain) Luis Salom	Kalex	26	+3.619	3	11
6	94	(Germany) Jonas Folger	Kalex	26	+3.918	1	10
7	77	(Switzerland) Dominique Aegerter	Suter	26	+12.324	15	9
8	12	(Switzerland) Thomas Lüthi	Suter	26	+15.552	5	8
9	22	(United Kingdom) Sam Lowes	Speed Up	26	+17.627	10	7
10	21	(Italy) Franco Morbidelli	Kalex	26	+28.704	14	6
11	23	(Germany) Marcel Schrötter	Tech 3	26	+33.593	17	5
12	11	(Germany) Sandro Cortese	Kalex	26	+36.158	9	4
13	4	(Switzerland) Randy Krummenacher	Suter	26	+36.227	24	3
14	95	(Australia) Anthony West	Speed Up	26	+36.547	27	2
15	55	(Malaysia) Hafizh Syahrin	Kalex	26	+36.672	26	1
16	30	(Japan) Takaaki Nakagami	Kalex	26	+37.240	21	
17	81	(Spain) Jordi Torres	Suter	26	+37.572	22	
18	90	(France) Lucas Mahias	TransFIORmers	26	+44.600	19	
19	8	(United Kingdom) Gino Rea	Suter	26	+48.311	23	
20	7	(Italy) Lorenzo Baldassarri	Suter	26	+48.654	29	
21	18	(Spain) Nicolás Terol	Suter	26	+48.886	28	
22	2	(United States) Josh Herrin	Caterham Suter	26	+53.477	30	
23	97	(Spain) Román Ramos	Speed Up	26	+1:09.106	33	
24	25	(Malaysia) Azlan Shah	Kalex	26	+1:09.326	34	
25	70	(Switzerland) Robin Mulhauser	Suter	26	+1:09.550	35	
26	88	(Spain) Ricard Cardús	Tech 3	26	+1:21.355	8	
Ret	60	(Spain) Julián Simón	Kalex	20	Retirement	12	
Ret	96	(France) Louis Rossi	Kalex	20	Accident	18	
Ret	49	(Spain) Axel Pons	Kalex	13	Accident	25	
Ret	10	(Thailand) Thitipong Warokorn	Kalex	9	Accident	32	
Ret	15	(San Marino) Alex de Angelis	Suter	6	Accident	13	
Ret	45	(Japan) Tetsuta Nagashima	TSR	5	Accident	31	
Ret	5	(France) Johann Zarco	Caterham Suter	3	Retirement	20	
Ret	54	(Italy) Mattia Pasini	Kalex	2	Accident	16	
Ret	19	(Belgium) Xavier Siméon	Suter	0	Accident	11	
OFFICIAL MOTO2 REPORT

=== Moto3 ===
Pos.	No.	Rider	Manufacturer	Laps	Time/Retired	Grid	Points
1	8	(Australia) Jack Miller	KTM	24	41:30.582	2	25
2	42	(Spain) Álex Rins	Honda	24	+0.095	3	20
3	32	(Spain) Isaac Viñales	KTM	24	+0.230	6	16
4	21	(Italy) Francesco Bagnaia	KTM	24	+0.487	17	13
5	12	(Spain) Álex Márquez	Honda	24	+0.931	7	11
6	7	(Spain) Efrén Vázquez	Honda	24	+0.940	1	10
7	33	(Italy) Enea Bastianini	KTM	24	+1.026	13	9
8	17	(United Kingdom) John McPhee	Honda	24	+1.221	8	8
9	10	(France) Alexis Masbou	Honda	24	+1.575	4	7
10	84	(Czech Republic) Jakub Kornfeil	KTM	24	+2.173	20	6
11	63	(Malaysia) Zulfahmi Khairuddin	Honda	24	+11.840	9	5
12	44	(Portugal) Miguel Oliveira	Mahindra	24	+14.504	14	4
13	52	(United Kingdom) Danny Kent	Husqvarna	24	+14.644	12	3
14	41	(South Africa) Brad Binder	Mahindra	24	+14.970	21	2
15	65	(Germany) Philipp Öttl	Kalex KTM	24	+22.226	22	1
16	38	(Malaysia) Hafiq Azmi	KTM	24	+22.941	19	
17	61	(Australia) Arthur Sissis	Mahindra	24	+34.284	27	
18	43	(Germany) Luca Grünwald	Kalex KTM	24	+36.495	26	
19	51	(Netherlands) Bryan Schouten	Mahindra	24	+36.610	24	
20	11	(Belgium) Livio Loi	Kalex KTM	24	+37.299	25	
21	3	(Italy) Matteo Ferrari	Mahindra	24	+40.190	28	
22	22	(Spain) Ana Carrasco	Kalex KTM	24	+52.239	30	
23	34	(Italy) Michael Ruben Rinaldi	Mahindra	24	+57.728	29	
24	4	(Venezuela) Gabriel Ramos	Kalex KTM	24	+59.699	32	
25	9	(Netherlands) Scott Deroue	Kalex KTM	23	+1 lap	23	
Ret	31	(Finland) Niklas Ajo	Husqvarna	21	Accident	5	
Ret	5	(Italy) Romano Fenati	KTM	19	Retirement	10	
Ret	19	(Italy) Alessandro Tonucci	Mahindra	7	Accident	16	
Ret	23	(Italy) Niccolò Antonelli	KTM	6	Accident	15	
Ret	98	(Czech Republic) Karel Hanika	KTM	3	Accident	11	
Ret	95	(France) Jules Danilo	Mahindra	3	Retirement	31	
Ret	58	(Spain) Juan Francisco Guevara	Kalex KTM	0	Accident	18	
DNS	57	(Brazil) Eric Granado	KTM		Did not start		
DNQ	73	(France) Rénald Castillon	Honda		Did not qualify		
OFFICIAL MOTO3 REPORT

== Championship standings after the race (MotoGP) ==
Below are the standings for the top five riders and constructors after round five has concluded.

Riders' Championship standings

Pos.	Rider	Points
1	(Spain) Marc Márquez	125
2	(Spain) Dani Pedrosa	83
3	(Italy) Valentino Rossi	81
4	(Italy) Andrea Dovizioso	53
5	(Spain) Jorge Lorenzo	45

Constructors' Championship standings

Pos.	Constructor	Points
1	(Japan) Honda	125
2	(Japan) Yamaha	87
3	(Italy) Ducati	56
4	(Switzerland) Forward Yamaha	37
5	(Italy) ART	2

- Note: Only the top five positions are included for both sets of standings.

Previous race: 2014 Spanish Grand Prix	FIM Grand Prix World Championship; 2014 season	Next race: 2014 Italian Grand Prix
Previous race: 2013 French Grand Prix	French motorcycle Grand Prix	Next race: 2015 French Grand Prix
