= 2014 Argentine Republic motorcycle Grand Prix =

(Argentina) 2014 Argentine Republic Grand Prix
Race details
- Race 3 of 18 races in the 2014 Grand Prix motorcycle racing season
- Date: 27 April 2014
- Official name: Gran Premio Red Bull de la República Argentina
- Location: Autódromo Termas de Río Hondo
- Course: Permanent racing facility; 4.806 km (2.986 mi)

MotoGP
Pole position
Rider	(Spain) Marc Márquez	Honda
Time	1:37.683	
Fastest lap
Rider	(Spain) Dani Pedrosa	Honda
Time	1:39.233 on lap 22	
Podium
First	(Spain) Marc Márquez	Honda
Second	(Spain) Dani Pedrosa	Honda
Third	(Spain) Jorge Lorenzo	Yamaha

Moto2
Pole position
Rider	(Spain) Esteve Rabat	Kalex
Time	1:43.961	
Fastest lap
Rider	(Spain) Luis Salom	Kalex
Time	1:44.011 on lap 21	
Podium
First	(Spain) Esteve Rabat	Kalex
Second	(Belgium) Xavier Siméon	Suter
Third	(Spain) Luis Salom	Kalex

Moto3
Pole position
Rider	(Australia) Jack Miller	KTM
Time	1:49.200	
Fastest lap
Rider	(Spain) Álex Márquez	Honda
Time	1:49.109 on lap 3	
Podium
First	(Italy) Romano Fenati	KTM
Second	(Spain) Álex Márquez	Honda
Third	(Australia) Jack Miller	KTM

The 2014 Argentine Republic motorcycle Grand Prix was the third round of the 2014 MotoGP season. It was held at the Autódromo Termas de Río Hondo in Santiago del Estero on 27 April 2014.

== Classification ==
=== MotoGP ===
Pos.	No.	Rider	Team	Manufacturer	Laps	Time/Retired	Grid	Points
1	93	(Spain) Marc Márquez	Repsol Honda Team	Honda	25	41:39.821	1	25
2	26	(Spain) Dani Pedrosa	Repsol Honda Team	Honda	25	+1.827	3	20
3	99	(Spain) Jorge Lorenzo	Movistar Yamaha MotoGP	Yamaha	25	+3.201	2	16
4	46	(Italy) Valentino Rossi	Movistar Yamaha MotoGP	Yamaha	25	+4.898	6	13
5	6	(Germany) Stefan Bradl	LCR Honda MotoGP	Honda	25	+15.029	9	11
6	29	(Italy) Andrea Iannone	Pramac Racing	Ducati	25	+19.447	8	10
7	38	(United Kingdom) Bradley Smith	Monster Yamaha Tech 3	Yamaha	25	+24.192	7	9
8	44	(Spain) Pol Espargaró	Monster Yamaha Tech 3	Yamaha	25	+29.118	11	8
9	4	(Italy) Andrea Dovizioso	Ducati Team	Ducati	25	+33.673	5	7
10	7	(Japan) Hiroshi Aoyama	Drive M7 Aspar	Honda	25	+43.279	16	6
11	69	(United States) Nicky Hayden	Drive M7 Aspar	Honda	25	+43.352	12	5
12	68	(Colombia) Yonny Hernández	Energy T.I. Pramac Racing	Ducati	25	+44.819	17	4
13	17	(Czech Republic) Karel Abraham	Cardion AB Motoracing	Honda	25	+45.178	15	3
14	45	(United Kingdom) Scott Redding	Go&Fun Honda Gresini	Honda	25	+48.656	13	2
15	41	(Spain) Aleix Espargaró	NGM Forward Racing	Forward Yamaha	25	+52.250	4	1
16	8	(Spain) Héctor Barberá	Avintia Racing	Avintia	25	+53.505	21	
17	51	(Italy) Michele Pirro	Ducati Team	Ducati	25	+53.669	19	
18	70	(United Kingdom) Michael Laverty	Paul Bird Motorsport	PBM	25	+56.570	20	
19	63	(France) Mike Di Meglio	Avintia Racing	Avintia	25	+1:03.140	22	
20	5	(United States) Colin Edwards	NGM Forward Racing	Forward Yamaha	25	+1:05.760	14	
21	23	(Australia) Broc Parkes	Paul Bird Motorsport	PBM	25	+1:16.722	18	
Ret	19	(Spain) Álvaro Bautista	Go&Fun Honda Gresini	Honda	0	Accident	10	
Ret	9	(Italy) Danilo Petrucci	IodaRacing Project	ART	0	Accident	23	

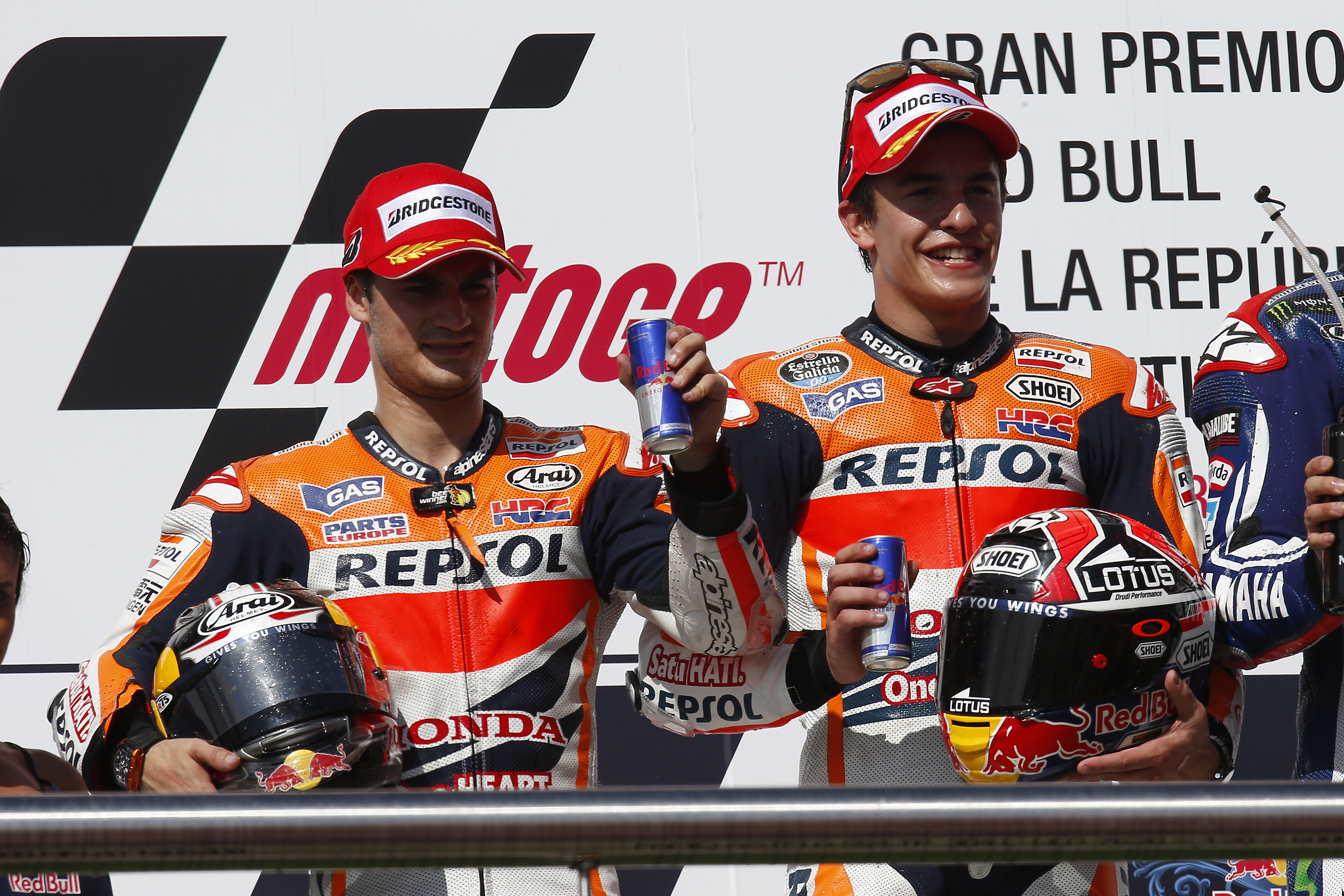
Dani Pedrosa and Marc Márquez, celebrating on the podium after finishing second and first at the MotoGP race.

=== Moto2 ===
Pos.	No.	Rider	Manufacturer	Laps	Time/Retired	Grid	Points
1	53	(Spain) Esteve Rabat	Kalex	23	40:06.114	1	25
2	19	(Belgium) Xavier Siméon	Suter	23	+2.094	3	20
3	39	(Spain) Luis Salom	Kalex	23	+3.702	6	16
4	77	(Switzerland) Dominique Aegerter	Suter	23	+4.868	16	13
5	3	(Italy) Simone Corsi	Forward KLX	23	+5.010	9	11
6	15	(San Marino) Alex de Angelis	Suter	23	+8.564	8	10
7	36	(Finland) Mika Kallio	Kalex	23	+13.157	14	9
8	22	(United Kingdom) Sam Lowes	Speed Up	23	+19.756	22	8
9	11	(Germany) Sandro Cortese	Kalex	23	+20.308	13	7
10	81	(Spain) Jordi Torres	Suter	23	+20.378	11	6
11	23	(Germany) Marcel Schrötter	Tech 3	23	+20.970	12	5
12	95	(Australia) Anthony West	Speed Up	23	+21.499	20	4
13	21	(Italy) Franco Morbidelli	Kalex	23	+26.799	15	3
14	18	(Spain) Nicolás Terol	Suter	23	+26.993	25	2
15	30	(Japan) Takaaki Nakagami	Kalex	23	+27.139	10	1
16	94	(Germany) Jonas Folger	Kalex	23	+28.598	5	
17	60	(Spain) Julián Simón	Kalex	23	+33.433	19	
18	5	(France) Johann Zarco	Caterham Suter	23	+36.469	2	
19	12	(Switzerland) Thomas Lüthi	Suter	23	+37.361	27	
20	55	(Malaysia) Hafizh Syahrin	Kalex	23	+43.603	17	
21	25	(Malaysia) Azlan Shah	Kalex	23	+47.719	31	
22	97	(Spain) Román Ramos	Speed Up	23	+48.286	29	
23	99	(Argentina) Sebastián Porto	Kalex	23	+51.314	32	
24	10	(Thailand) Thitipong Warokorn	Kalex	23	+53.786	33	
25	96	(France) Louis Rossi	Kalex	23	+53.807	24	
26	49	(Spain) Axel Pons	Kalex	23	+55.902	26	
27	4	(Switzerland) Randy Krummenacher	Suter	23	+56.812	23	
28	7	(Italy) Lorenzo Baldassarri	Suter	23	+1:00.599	21	
29	70	(Switzerland) Robin Mulhauser	Suter	23	+1:00.877	34	
30	8	(United Kingdom) Gino Rea	Suter	23	+1:08.910	28	
31	45	(Japan) Tetsuta Nagashima	TSR	23	+1:08.978	30	
Ret	40	(Spain) Maverick Viñales	Kalex	5	Retirement	4	
Ret	88	(Spain) Ricard Cardús	Tech 3	2	Accident	18	
Ret	54	(Italy) Mattia Pasini	Forward KLX	0	Retirement	7	
OFFICIAL MOTO2 REPORT

=== Moto3 ===
Pos.	No.	Rider	Manufacturer	Laps	Time/Retired	Grid	Points
1	5	(Italy) Romano Fenati	KTM	21	38:34.451	5	25
2	12	(Spain) Álex Márquez	Honda	21	+0.099	11	20
3	8	(Australia) Jack Miller	KTM	21	+0.540	1	16
4	11	(Belgium) Livio Loi	Kalex KTM	21	+0.624	9	13
5	42	(Spain) Álex Rins	Honda	21	+5.530	8	11
6	7	(Spain) Efrén Vázquez	Honda	21	+5.653	2	10
7	32	(Spain) Isaac Viñales	KTM	21	+8.965	18	9
8	31	(Finland) Niklas Ajo	Husqvarna	21	+14.985	7	8
9	52	(United Kingdom) Danny Kent	Husqvarna	21	+15.043	3	7
10	33	(Italy) Enea Bastianini	KTM	21	+17.310	17	6
11	10	(France) Alexis Masbou	Honda	21	+18.821	20	5
12	58	(Spain) Juan Francisco Guevara	Kalex KTM	21	+19.038	12	4
13	19	(Italy) Alessandro Tonucci	Mahindra	21	+19.197	10	3
14	41	(South Africa) Brad Binder	Mahindra	21	+29.001	19	2
15	63	(Malaysia) Zulfahmi Khairuddin	Honda	21	+38.124	25	1
16	38	(Malaysia) Hafiq Azmi	KTM	21	+38.610	30	
17	9	(Netherlands) Scott Deroue	Kalex KTM	21	+38.669	21	
18	51	(Netherlands) Bryan Schouten	Mahindra	21	+38.807	24	
19	57	(Brazil) Eric Granado	KTM	21	+48.717	27	
20	84	(Czech Republic) Jakub Kornfeil	KTM	21	+58.925	4	
21	65	(Germany) Philipp Öttl	Kalex KTM	21	+59.582	31	
22	61	(Australia) Arthur Sissis	Mahindra	21	+1:00.029	29	
23	22	(Spain) Ana Carrasco	Kalex KTM	21	+1:00.112	28	
24	95	(France) Jules Danilo	Mahindra	21	+1:06.128	32	
25	23	(Italy) Niccolò Antonelli	KTM	21	+1:10.178	15	
26	4	(Venezuela) Gabriel Ramos	Kalex KTM	21	+1:20.240	33	
Ret	3	(Italy) Matteo Ferrari	Mahindra	19	Accident	23	
Ret	98	(Czech Republic) Karel Hanika	KTM	18	Accident	16	
Ret	43	(Germany) Luca Grünwald	Kalex KTM	9	Accident	26	
Ret	21	(Italy) Francesco Bagnaia	KTM	8	Retirement	6	
Ret	17	(United Kingdom) John McPhee	Honda	7	Accident	13	
Ret	55	(Italy) Andrea Locatelli	Mahindra	0	Accident	22	
DNS	44	(Portugal) Miguel Oliveira	Mahindra	0	Did not start	14	
OFFICIAL MOTO3 REPORT

== Championship standings after the race (MotoGP) ==
Below are the standings for the top five riders and constructors after round three has concluded.

Riders' Championship standings

Pos.	Rider	Points
1	(Spain) Marc Márquez	75
2	(Spain) Dani Pedrosa	56
3	(Italy) Valentino Rossi	41
4	(Italy) Andrea Dovizioso	34
5	(Italy) Andrea Iannone	25

Constructors' Championship standings

Pos.	Constructor	Points
1	(Japan) Honda	75
2	(Japan) Yamaha	47
3	(Italy) Ducati	37
4	(Switzerland) Forward Yamaha	21
5	(Italy) ART	2

- Note: Only the top five positions are included for both sets of standings.

Previous race: 2014 Grand Prix of the Americas	FIM Grand Prix World Championship; 2014 season	Next race: 2014 Spanish Grand Prix
Previous race: 1999 Argentine Grand Prix	Argentine Republic motorcycle Grand Prix	Next race: 2015 Argentine Grand Prix
