= 2014 Czech Republic motorcycle Grand Prix =

2014 Czech Republic Grand Prix
Race details
- Race 11 of 18 races in the 2014 Grand Prix motorcycle racing season
- Date: 17 August 2014
- Official name: bwin Grand Prix České republiky
- Location: Brno Circuit
- Course: Permanent racing facility; 5.403 km (3.357 mi)

MotoGP
Pole position
Rider	(Spain) Marc Márquez	Honda
Time	1:55.585	
Fastest lap
Rider	(Spain) Dani Pedrosa	Honda
Time	1:56.027 on lap 4	
Podium
First	(Spain) Dani Pedrosa	Honda
Second	(Spain) Jorge Lorenzo	Yamaha
Third	(Italy) Valentino Rossi	Yamaha

Moto2
Pole position
Rider	(Spain) Esteve Rabat	Kalex
Time	2:01.911	
Fastest lap
Rider	(Spain) Esteve Rabat	Kalex
Time	2:02.383 on lap 5	
Podium
First	(Spain) Esteve Rabat	Kalex
Second	(Finland) Mika Kallio	Kalex
Third	(Germany) Sandro Cortese	Kalex

Moto3
Pole position
Rider	(Spain) Álex Márquez	Honda
Time	2:07.691	
Fastest lap
Rider	(Italy) Romano Fenati	KTM
Time	2:08.064 on lap 3	
Podium
First	(France) Alexis Masbou	Honda
Second	(Italy) Enea Bastianini	KTM
Third	(United Kingdom) Danny Kent	Husqvarna

The 2014 Czech Republic motorcycle Grand Prix was the eleventh round of the 2014 MotoGP season. It was held at the Brno Circuit in Brno on 17 August 2014.

In MotoGP, Marc Márquez was defeated for the first time in the 2014 season, as he could only finish fourth in the race. Instead, it was his Repsol Honda teammate Dani Pedrosa that took the victory, ahead of the Yamahas of Jorge Lorenzo and Valentino Rossi. In Moto2, championship leader Esteve Rabat took his fifth victory of the season, leading home Marc VDS Racing Team teammate Mika Kallio, while the podium was completed by Sandro Cortese, taking his first podium in the class.

The Moto3 race was closely fought, with the points-scoring positions – from the winner to 15th place – covered by just 1.838 seconds at the finish, a record for all Grand Prix races. The race was won by category veteran Alexis Masbou for his first Grand Prix win. Enea Bastianini took his first podium finish in second place, with the podium completed by Danny Kent, his first podium since returning to Moto3. Álex Rins finished down in ninth position, having prematurely celebrated what he thought was a race victory.

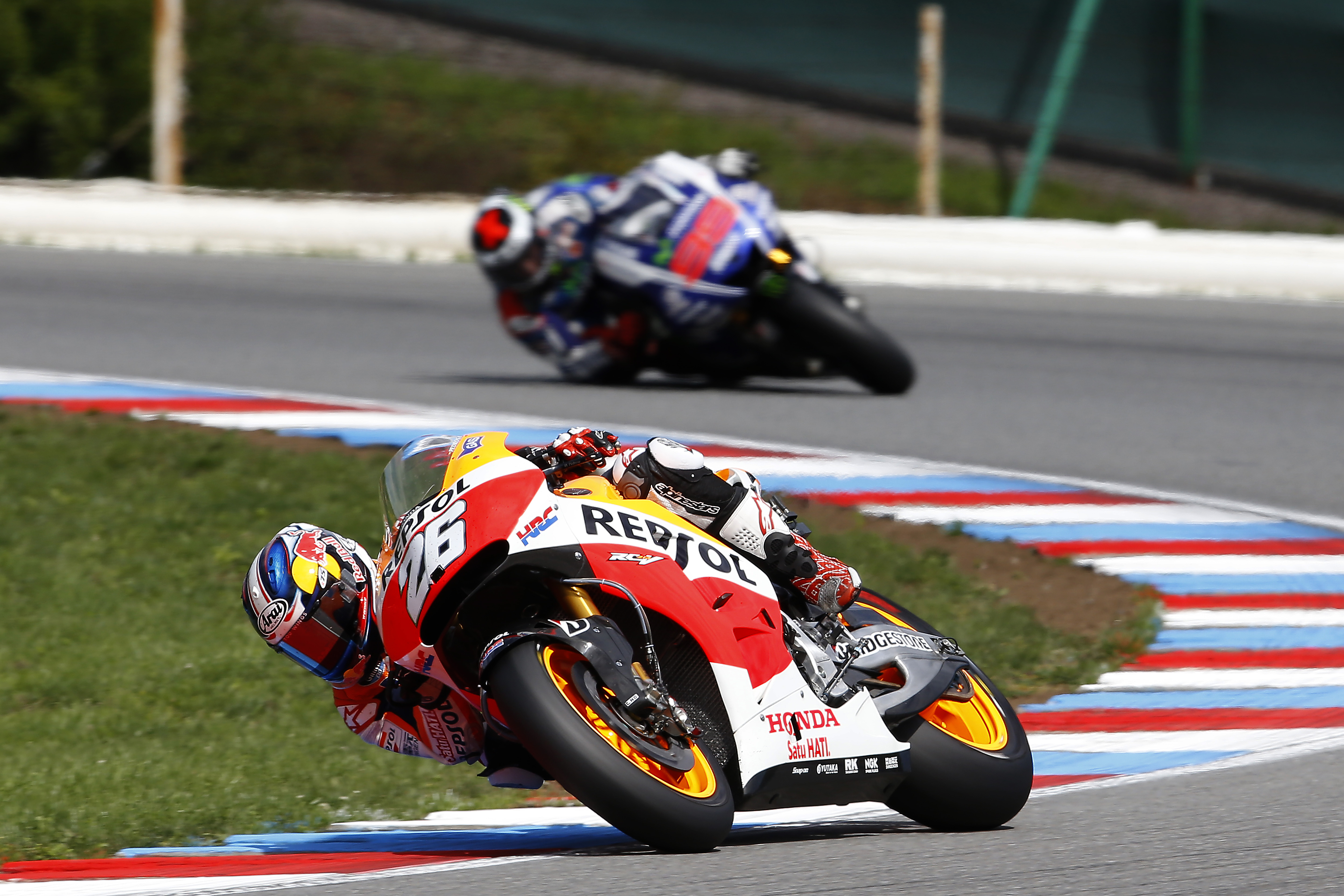
Dani Pedrosa and Jorge Lorenzo, battling for the lead in the MotoGP race. Pedrosa went on to win the race, with Lorenzo finishing in second place.

== Classification ==
=== MotoGP ===
Pos.	No.	Rider	Team	Manufacturer	Laps	Time/Retired	Grid	Points
1	26	(Spain) Dani Pedrosa	Repsol Honda Team	Honda	22	42:47.800	5	25
2	99	(Spain) Jorge Lorenzo	Movistar Yamaha MotoGP	Yamaha	22	+0.410	6	20
3	46	(Italy) Valentino Rossi	Movistar Yamaha MotoGP	Yamaha	22	+5.259	7	16
4	93	(Spain) Marc Márquez	Repsol Honda Team	Honda	22	+10.454	1	13
5	29	(Italy) Andrea Iannone	Pramac Racing	Ducati	22	+17.639	3	11
6	4	(Italy) Andrea Dovizioso	Ducati Team	Ducati	22	+17.834	2	10
7	6	(Germany) Stefan Bradl	LCR Honda MotoGP	Honda	22	+23.819	8	9
8	41	(Spain) Aleix Espargaró	NGM Forward Racing	Forward Yamaha	22	+29.621	10	8
9	38	(United Kingdom) Bradley Smith	Monster Yamaha Tech 3	Yamaha	22	+30.364	4	7
10	19	(Spain) Álvaro Bautista	Go&Fun Honda Gresini	Honda	22	+37.639	14	6
11	45	(United Kingdom) Scott Redding	Go&Fun Honda Gresini	Honda	22	+55.604	15	5
12	51	(Italy) Michele Pirro	Ducati Team	Ducati	22	+56.727	13	4
13	7	(Japan) Hiroshi Aoyama	Drive M7 Aspar	Honda	22	+56.908	16	3
14	17	(Czech Republic) Karel Abraham	Cardion AB Motoracing	Honda	22	+1:04.135	17	2
15	2	(United Kingdom) Leon Camier	Drive M7 Aspar	Honda	22	+1:04.902	18	1
16	15	(San Marino) Alex de Angelis	NGM Forward Racing	Forward Yamaha	22	+1:20.666	20	
17	8	(Spain) Héctor Barberá	Avintia Racing	Avintia	22	+1:24.282	21	
18	63	(France) Mike Di Meglio	Avintia Racing	Avintia	22	+1:27.436	24	
19	23	(Australia) Broc Parkes	Paul Bird Motorsport	PBM	22	+1:38.867	23	
Ret	9	(Italy) Danilo Petrucci	Octo IodaRacing Team	ART	20	Retirement	19	
Ret	35	(United Kingdom) Cal Crutchlow	Ducati Team	Ducati	7	Retirement	11	
Ret	44	(Spain) Pol Espargaró	Monster Yamaha Tech 3	Yamaha	6	Accident	9	
Ret	70	(United Kingdom) Michael Laverty	Paul Bird Motorsport	PBM	6	Accident	22	
Ret	68	(Colombia) Yonny Hernández	Energy T.I. Pramac Racing	Ducati	5	Retirement	12	

=== Moto2 ===
Pos.	No.	Rider	Manufacturer	Laps	Time/Retired	Grid	Points
1	53	(Spain) Esteve Rabat	Kalex	20	41:05.058	1	25
2	36	(Finland) Mika Kallio	Kalex	20	+3.274	6	20
3	11	(Germany) Sandro Cortese	Kalex	20	+6.227	3	16
4	12	(Switzerland) Thomas Lüthi	Suter	20	+8.083	2	13
5	77	(Switzerland) Dominique Aegerter	Suter	20	+8.145	7	11
6	40	(Spain) Maverick Viñales	Kalex	20	+9.392	17	10
7	60	(Spain) Julián Simón	Kalex	20	+10.669	11	9
8	21	(Italy) Franco Morbidelli	Kalex	20	+14.561	10	8
9	5	(France) Johann Zarco	Caterham Suter	20	+15.242	12	7
10	23	(Germany) Marcel Schrötter	Tech 3	20	+17.170	8	6
11	49	(Spain) Axel Pons	Kalex	20	+21.328	15	5
12	3	(Italy) Simone Corsi	Kalex	20	+21.534	5	4
13	55	(Malaysia) Hafizh Syahrin	Kalex	20	+21.686	21	3
14	19	(Belgium) Xavier Siméon	Suter	20	+21.985	20	2
15	94	(Germany) Jonas Folger	Kalex	20	+22.144	9	1
16	96	(France) Louis Rossi	Kalex	20	+23.588	18	
17	54	(Italy) Mattia Pasini	Kalex	20	+23.865	13	
18	81	(Spain) Jordi Torres	Suter	20	+23.960	19	
19	30	(Japan) Takaaki Nakagami	Kalex	20	+25.367	22	
20	88	(Spain) Ricard Cardús	Tech 3	20	+25.719	16	
21	2	(United States) Josh Herrin	Caterham Suter	20	+33.473	33	
22	95	(Australia) Anthony West	Speed Up	20	+33.890	28	
23	84	(Italy) Riccardo Russo	Suter	20	+34.152	26	
24	4	(Switzerland) Randy Krummenacher	Suter	20	+34.307	25	
25	18	(Spain) Nicolás Terol	Suter	20	+34.575	29	
26	8	(United Kingdom) Gino Rea	Suter	20	+36.821	27	
27	97	(Spain) Román Ramos	Speed Up	20	+50.747	31	
28	25	(Malaysia) Azlan Shah	Kalex	20	+1:01.646	32	
29	10	(Thailand) Thitipong Warokorn	Kalex	20	+1:01.765	36	
30	70	(Switzerland) Robin Mulhauser	Suter	20	+1:39.362	30	
31	90	(France) Lucas Mahias	TransFIORmers	20	+2:00.810	23	
Ret	39	(Spain) Luis Salom	Kalex	15	Accident	14	
Ret	59	(Czech Republic) Miroslav Popov	Suter	8	Accident	35	
Ret	22	(United Kingdom) Sam Lowes	Speed Up	7	Retirement	4	
Ret	45	(Japan) Tetsuta Nagashima	TSR	3	Accident	34	
Ret	7	(Italy) Lorenzo Baldassarri	Suter	0	Accident	24	
OFFICIAL MOTO2 REPORT

=== Moto3 ===
Pos.	No.	Rider	Manufacturer	Laps	Time/Retired	Grid	Points
1	10	(France) Alexis Masbou	Honda	19	40:59.759	7	25
2	33	(Italy) Enea Bastianini	KTM	19	+0.157	9	20
3	52	(United Kingdom) Danny Kent	Husqvarna	19	+0.187	12	16
4	12	(Spain) Álex Márquez	Honda	19	+0.200	1	13
5	8	(Australia) Jack Miller	KTM	19	+0.217	6	11
6	41	(South Africa) Brad Binder	Mahindra	19	+0.310	14	10
7	44	(Portugal) Miguel Oliveira	Mahindra	19	+0.470	5	9
8	7	(Spain) Efrén Vázquez	Honda	19	+0.549	8	8
9	42	(Spain) Álex Rins	Honda	19	+0.910	4	7
10	32	(Spain) Isaac Viñales	KTM	19	+1.009	2	6
11	5	(Italy) Romano Fenati	KTM	19	+1.042	10	5
12	31	(Finland) Niklas Ajo	Husqvarna	19	+1.061	16	4
13	23	(Italy) Niccolò Antonelli	KTM	19	+1.191	3	3
14	84	(Czech Republic) Jakub Kornfeil	KTM	19	+1.809	13	2
15	98	(Czech Republic) Karel Hanika	KTM	19	+1.838	17	1
16	58	(Spain) Juan Francisco Guevara	Kalex KTM	19	+1.944	18	
17	21	(Italy) Francesco Bagnaia	KTM	19	+12.764	20	
18	95	(France) Jules Danilo	Mahindra	19	+14.759	29	
19	9	(Netherlands) Scott Deroue	Kalex KTM	19	+15.179	25	
20	3	(Italy) Matteo Ferrari	Mahindra	19	+15.193	26	
21	19	(Italy) Alessandro Tonucci	Mahindra	19	+15.258	15	
22	63	(Malaysia) Zulfahmi Khairuddin	Honda	19	+21.659	22	
23	51	(Netherlands) Bryan Schouten	Mahindra	19	+21.721	30	
24	65	(Germany) Philipp Öttl	Kalex KTM	19	+26.792	32	
25	55	(Italy) Andrea Locatelli	Mahindra	19	+26.828	23	
26	61	(Australia) Arthur Sissis	Mahindra	19	+27.033	31	
27	57	(Brazil) Eric Granado	KTM	19	+36.752	21	
28	38	(Malaysia) Hafiq Azmi	KTM	19	+1:04.397	24	
29	4	(Venezuela) Gabriel Ramos	Kalex KTM	19	+1:06.287	34	
Ret	43	(Germany) Luca Grünwald	Kalex KTM	12	Accident	28	
Ret	22	(Spain) Ana Carrasco	Kalex KTM	12	Retirement	33	
Ret	91	(Argentina) Gabriel Rodrigo	KTM	11	Accident	27	
Ret	17	(United Kingdom) John McPhee	Honda	1	Accident	11	
Ret	99	(Spain) Jorge Navarro	Kalex KTM	1	Accident	19	
OFFICIAL MOTO3 REPORT

== Championship standings after the race (MotoGP) ==
Below are the standings for the top five riders and constructors after round eleven has concluded.

Riders' Championship standings

Pos.	Rider	Points
1	(Spain) Marc Márquez	263
2	(Spain) Dani Pedrosa	186
3	(Italy) Valentino Rossi	173
4	(Spain) Jorge Lorenzo	137
5	(Italy) Andrea Dovizioso	118

Constructors' Championship standings

Pos.	Constructor	Points
1	(Japan) Honda	275
2	(Japan) Yamaha	194
3	(Italy) Ducati	125
4	(Switzerland) Forward Yamaha	88
5	(United Kingdom) PBM	8

- Note: Only the top five positions are included for both sets of standings.

Previous race: 2014 Indianapolis Grand Prix	FIM Grand Prix World Championship; 2014 season	Next race: 2014 British Grand Prix
Previous race: 2013 Czech Republic Grand Prix	Czech Republic motorcycle Grand Prix	Next race: 2015 Czech Republic Grand Prix
