= 2014 British motorcycle Grand Prix =

(United Kingdom) 2014 British Grand Prix
Race details
- Race 12 of 18 races in the 2014 Grand Prix motorcycle racing season
- Date: 31 August 2014
- Official name: Hertz British Grand Prix
- Location: Silverstone Circuit
- Course: Permanent racing facility; 5.900 km (3.666 mi)

MotoGP
Pole position
Rider	(Spain) Marc Márquez	Honda
Time	2:00.829	
Fastest lap
Rider	(Spain) Marc Márquez	Honda
Time	2:01.980 on lap 13	
Podium
First	(Spain) Marc Márquez	Honda
Second	(Spain) Jorge Lorenzo	Yamaha
Third	(Italy) Valentino Rossi	Yamaha

Moto2
Pole position
Rider	(France) Johann Zarco	Caterham Suter
Time	2:07.094	
Fastest lap
Rider	(Spain) Esteve Rabat	Kalex
Time	2:07.253 on lap 15	
Podium
First	(Spain) Esteve Rabat	Kalex
Second	(Finland) Mika Kallio	Kalex
Third	(Spain) Maverick Viñales	Kalex

Moto3
Pole position
Rider	(Spain) Álex Rins	Honda
Time	2:13.112	
Fastest lap
Rider	(Czech Republic) Jakub Kornfeil	KTM
Time	2:13.664 on lap 5	
Podium
First	(Spain) Álex Rins	Honda
Second	(Spain) Álex Márquez	Honda
Third	(Italy) Enea Bastianini	KTM

The 2014 British motorcycle Grand Prix was the twelfth round of the 2014 Grand Prix motorcycle racing season. It was held at the Silverstone Circuit in Silverstone on 31 August 2014.

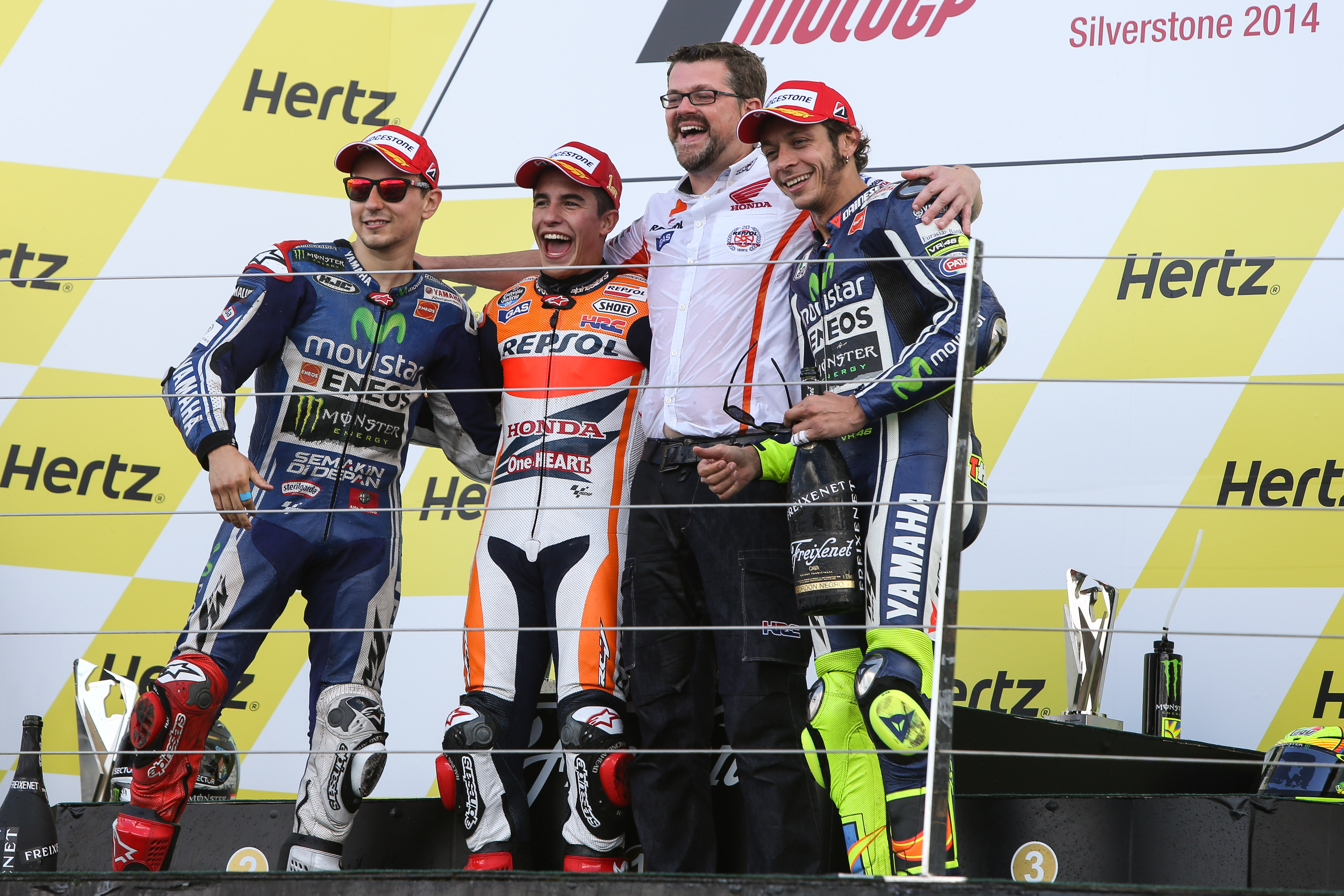
Jorge Lorenzo, Marc Márquez and Valentino Rossi, celebrating on the podium after finishing second, first and third in the MotoGP race.

== Classification ==
=== MotoGP ===
Pos.	No.	Rider	Team	Manufacturer	Laps	Time/Retired	Grid	Points
1	93	(Spain) Marc Márquez	Repsol Honda Team	Honda	20	40:51.835	1	25
2	99	(Spain) Jorge Lorenzo	Movistar Yamaha MotoGP	Yamaha	20	+0.732	3	20
3	46	(Italy) Valentino Rossi	Movistar Yamaha MotoGP	Yamaha	20	+8.519	6	16
4	26	(Spain) Dani Pedrosa	Repsol Honda Team	Honda	20	+8.694	5	13
5	4	(Italy) Andrea Dovizioso	Ducati Team	Ducati	20	+9.238	2	11
6	44	(Spain) Pol Espargaró	Monster Yamaha Tech 3	Yamaha	20	+24.746	8	10
7	6	(Germany) Stefan Bradl	LCR Honda MotoGP	Honda	20	+26.717	9	9
8	29	(Italy) Andrea Iannone	Pramac Racing	Ducati	20	+26.910	10	8
9	41	(Spain) Aleix Espargaró	NGM Forward Racing	Forward Yamaha	20	+33.455	4	7
10	45	(United Kingdom) Scott Redding	Go&Fun Honda Gresini	Honda	20	+39.094	11	6
11	68	(Colombia) Yonny Hernández	Energy T.I. Pramac Racing	Ducati	20	+40.255	13	5
12	35	(United Kingdom) Cal Crutchlow	Ducati Team	Ducati	20	+43.027	15	4
13	17	(Czech Republic) Karel Abraham	Cardion AB Motoracing	Honda	20	+52.245	14	3
14	7	(Japan) Hiroshi Aoyama	Drive M7 Aspar	Honda	20	+58.981	16	2
15	15	(San Marino) Alex de Angelis	NGM Forward Racing	Forward Yamaha	20	+59.164	17	1
16	2	(United Kingdom) Leon Camier	Drive M7 Aspar	Honda	20	+1:05.680	18	
17	70	(United Kingdom) Michael Laverty	Paul Bird Motorsport	PBM	20	+1:10.939	20	
18	9	(Italy) Danilo Petrucci	Octo IodaRacing Team	ART	20	+1:16.834	19	
19	8	(Spain) Héctor Barberá	Avintia Racing	Avintia	20	+1:16.904	21	
20	63	(France) Mike Di Meglio	Avintia Racing	Avintia	20	+1:34.939	22	
21	23	(Australia) Broc Parkes	Paul Bird Motorsport	PBM	20	+1:38.442	23	
22	38	(United Kingdom) Bradley Smith	Monster Yamaha Tech 3	Yamaha	19	+1 lap	7	
Ret	19	(Spain) Álvaro Bautista	Go&Fun Honda Gresini	Honda	18	Accident	12	

=== Moto2 ===
Pos.	No.	Rider	Manufacturer	Laps	Time/Retired	Grid	Points
1	53	(Spain) Esteve Rabat	Kalex	18	38:29.795	4	25
2	36	(Finland) Mika Kallio	Kalex	18	+0.063	2	20
3	40	(Spain) Maverick Viñales	Kalex	18	+0.203	8	16
4	5	(France) Johann Zarco	Caterham Suter	18	+2.774	1	13
5	12	(Switzerland) Thomas Lüthi	Suter	18	+8.029	6	11
6	21	(Italy) Franco Morbidelli	Kalex	18	+10.529	10	10
7	22	(United Kingdom) Sam Lowes	Speed Up	18	+10.564	7	9
8	55	(Malaysia) Hafizh Syahrin	Kalex	18	+17.713	21	8
9	54	(Italy) Mattia Pasini	Kalex	18	+17.802	14	7
10	49	(Spain) Axel Pons	Kalex	18	+18.035	11	6
11	81	(Spain) Jordi Torres	Suter	18	+18.098	18	5
12	60	(Spain) Julián Simón	Kalex	18	+18.290	13	4
13	4	(Switzerland) Randy Krummenacher	Suter	18	+18.820	24	3
14	23	(Germany) Marcel Schrötter	Tech 3	18	+19.551	22	2
15	30	(Japan) Takaaki Nakagami	Kalex	18	+20.870	12	1
16	88	(Spain) Ricard Cardús	Tech 3	18	+21.320	20	
17	96	(France) Louis Rossi	Kalex	18	+22.697	15	
18	11	(Germany) Sandro Cortese	Kalex	18	+29.842	9	
19	39	(Spain) Luis Salom	Kalex	18	+33.487	16	
20	8	(United Kingdom) Gino Rea	Suter	18	+33.792	26	
21	77	(Switzerland) Dominique Aegerter	Suter	18	+47.561	19	
22	95	(Australia) Anthony West	Speed Up	18	+47.660	25	
23	84	(Italy) Riccardo Russo	Suter	18	+47.866	27	
24	2	(United States) Josh Herrin	Caterham Suter	18	+47.982	28	
25	25	(Malaysia) Azlan Shah	Kalex	18	+48.207	31	
26	97	(Spain) Román Ramos	Speed Up	18	+48.515	29	
27	70	(Switzerland) Robin Mulhauser	Suter	18	+49.699	30	
28	10	(Thailand) Thitipong Warokorn	Kalex	18	+1:07.489	32	
29	9	(United Kingdom) Jeremy McWilliams	Taylor Made	17	+1 lap	34	
30	80	(Belgium) Dakota Mamola	Suter	15	+3 laps	33	
Ret	7	(Italy) Lorenzo Baldassarri	Suter	14	Accident	23	
Ret	94	(Germany) Jonas Folger	Kalex	12	Accident	5	
Ret	3	(Italy) Simone Corsi	Kalex	12	Accident	3	
Ret	19	(Belgium) Xavier Siméon	Suter	9	Accident	17	
DNS	45	(Japan) Tetsuta Nagashima	TSR		Did not start		
OFFICIAL MOTO2 REPORT

=== Moto3 ===
Pos.	No.	Rider	Manufacturer	Laps	Time/Retired	Grid	Points
1	42	(Spain) Álex Rins	Honda	17	38:11.330	1	25
2	12	(Spain) Álex Márquez	Honda	17	+0.011	3	20
3	33	(Italy) Enea Bastianini	KTM	17	+0.072	4	16
4	44	(Portugal) Miguel Oliveira	Mahindra	17	+0.123	7	13
5	84	(Czech Republic) Jakub Kornfeil	KTM	17	+4.600	16	11
6	8	(Australia) Jack Miller	KTM	17	+4.701	8	10
7	23	(Italy) Niccolò Antonelli	KTM	17	+4.767	2	9
8	10	(France) Alexis Masbou	Honda	17	+5.593	6	8
9	52	(United Kingdom) Danny Kent	Husqvarna	17	+5.659	12	7
10	31	(Finland) Niklas Ajo	Husqvarna	17	+5.671	10	6
11	17	(United Kingdom) John McPhee	Honda	17	+5.749	17	5
12	98	(Czech Republic) Karel Hanika	KTM	17	+5.940	13	4
13	32	(Spain) Isaac Viñales	KTM	17	+6.022	9	3
14	58	(Spain) Juan Francisco Guevara	Kalex KTM	17	+6.204	11	2
15	41	(South Africa) Brad Binder	Mahindra	17	+6.326	5	1
16	5	(Italy) Romano Fenati	KTM	17	+6.489	22	
17	65	(Germany) Philipp Öttl	Kalex KTM	17	+27.163	25	
18	63	(Malaysia) Zulfahmi Khairuddin	Honda	17	+27.826	23	
19	55	(Italy) Andrea Locatelli	Mahindra	17	+28.326	29	
20	38	(Malaysia) Hafiq Azmi	KTM	17	+28.374	20	
21	21	(Italy) Francesco Bagnaia	KTM	17	+29.167	18	
22	19	(Italy) Alessandro Tonucci	Mahindra	17	+29.222	24	
23	13	(Netherlands) Jasper Iwema	FTR KTM	17	+29.625	28	
24	3	(Italy) Matteo Ferrari	Mahindra	17	+30.246	19	
25	95	(France) Jules Danilo	Mahindra	17	+32.722	30	
26	57	(Brazil) Eric Granado	KTM	17	+39.672	27	
27	99	(Spain) Jorge Navarro	Kalex KTM	17	+40.742	26	
28	4	(Venezuela) Gabriel Ramos	Kalex KTM	17	+43.069	33	
29	22	(Spain) Ana Carrasco	Kalex KTM	17	+1:02.069	32	
Ret	9	(Netherlands) Scott Deroue	Kalex KTM	13	Retirement	14	
Ret	16	(Italy) Andrea Migno	Mahindra	2	Accident	21	
Ret	7	(Spain) Efrén Vázquez	Honda	0	Accident	15	
Ret	66	(United Kingdom) Joe Irving	KTM	0	Accident	31	
DNS	51	(Netherlands) Bryan Schouten	Mahindra		Did not start		
DNS	43	(Germany) Luca Grünwald	Kalex KTM		Did not start		
OFFICIAL MOTO3 REPORT

== Championship standings after the race (MotoGP) ==
Below are the standings for the top five riders and constructors after round twelve has concluded.

Riders' Championship standings

Pos.	Rider	Points
1	(Spain) Marc Márquez	288
2	(Spain) Dani Pedrosa	199
3	(Italy) Valentino Rossi	189
4	(Spain) Jorge Lorenzo	157
5	(Italy) Andrea Dovizioso	129

Constructors' Championship standings

Pos.	Constructor	Points
1	(Japan) Honda	300
2	(Japan) Yamaha	214
3	(Italy) Ducati	136
4	(Switzerland) Forward Yamaha	95
5	(United Kingdom) PBM	8

- Note: Only the top five positions are included for both sets of standings.

Previous race: 2014 Czech Republic Grand Prix	FIM Grand Prix World Championship; 2014 season	Next race: 2014 San Marino Grand Prix
Previous race: 2013 British Grand Prix	British motorcycle Grand Prix	Next race: 2015 British Grand Prix
