= 2014 Spanish motorcycle Grand Prix =

(Spain) 2014 Spanish Grand Prix
Race details
- Race 4 of 18 races in the 2014 Grand Prix motorcycle racing season
- Date: 4 May 2014
- Official name: Gran Premio bwin de España
- Location: Circuito de Jerez
- Course: Permanent racing facility; 4.423 km (2.748 mi)

MotoGP
Pole position
Rider	(Spain) Marc Márquez	Honda
Time	1:38.120	
Fastest lap
Rider	(Spain) Marc Márquez	Honda
Time	1:39.841 on lap 5	
Podium
First	(Spain) Marc Márquez	Honda
Second	(Italy) Valentino Rossi	Yamaha
Third	(Spain) Dani Pedrosa	Honda

Moto2
Pole position
Rider	(Finland) Mika Kallio	Kalex
Time	1:42.766	
Fastest lap
Rider	(Germany) Jonas Folger	Kalex
Time	1:42.876 on lap 2	
Podium
First	(Finland) Mika Kallio	Kalex
Second	(Switzerland) Dominique Aegerter	Suter
Third	(Germany) Jonas Folger	Kalex

Moto3
Pole position
Rider	(Australia) Jack Miller	KTM
Time	1:46.173	
Fastest lap
Rider	(Spain) Álex Rins	Honda
Time	1:47.033 on lap 4	
Podium
First	(Italy) Romano Fenati	KTM
Second	(Spain) Efrén Vázquez	Honda
Third	(Spain) Álex Rins	Honda

The 2014 Spanish motorcycle Grand Prix was the fourth round of the 2014 MotoGP season. It was held at the Circuito de Jerez in Jerez de la Frontera on 4 May 2014.

== Classification ==
=== MotoGP ===
Pos.	No.	Rider	Team	Manufacturer	Laps	Time/Retired	Grid	Points
1	93	(Spain) Marc Márquez	Repsol Honda Team	Honda	27	45:24.134	1	25
2	46	(Italy) Valentino Rossi	Movistar Yamaha MotoGP	Yamaha	27	+1.431	4	20
3	26	(Spain) Dani Pedrosa	Repsol Honda Team	Honda	27	+1.529	3	16
4	99	(Spain) Jorge Lorenzo	Movistar Yamaha MotoGP	Yamaha	27	+8.541	2	13
5	4	(Italy) Andrea Dovizioso	Ducati Team	Ducati	27	+27.494	6	11
6	19	(Spain) Álvaro Bautista	Go&Fun Honda Gresini	Honda	27	+27.606	10	10
7	41	(Spain) Aleix Espargaró	NGM Forward Racing	Forward Yamaha	27	+27.917	5	9
8	38	(United Kingdom) Bradley Smith	Monster Yamaha Tech 3	Yamaha	27	+27.947	9	8
9	44	(Spain) Pol Espargaró	Monster Yamaha Tech 3	Yamaha	27	+29.419	8	7
10	6	(Germany) Stefan Bradl	LCR Honda MotoGP	Honda	27	+32.872	7	6
11	69	(United States) Nicky Hayden	Drive M7 Aspar	Honda	27	+35.490	12	5
12	7	(Japan) Hiroshi Aoyama	Drive M7 Aspar	Honda	27	+40.083	13	4
13	45	(United Kingdom) Scott Redding	Go&Fun Honda Gresini	Honda	27	+43.830	18	3
14	68	(Colombia) Yonny Hernández	Energy T.I. Pramac Racing	Ducati	27	+52.295	19	2
15	8	(Spain) Héctor Barberá	Avintia Racing	Avintia	27	+54.873	23	1
16	70	(United Kingdom) Michael Laverty	Paul Bird Motorsport	PBM	27	+1:06.182	20	
17	23	(Australia) Broc Parkes	Paul Bird Motorsport	PBM	27	+1:23.420	22	
Ret	5	(United States) Colin Edwards	NGM Forward Racing	Forward Yamaha	26	Retirement	11	
Ret	29	(Italy) Andrea Iannone	Pramac Racing	Ducati	22	Retirement	15	
Ret	63	(France) Mike Di Meglio	Avintia Racing	Avintia	21	Retirement	21	
Ret	17	(Czech Republic) Karel Abraham	Cardion AB Motoracing	Honda	10	Retirement	16	
Ret	35	(United Kingdom) Cal Crutchlow	Ducati Team	Ducati	4	Retirement	14	
Ret	51	(Italy) Michele Pirro	Ducati Team	Ducati	2	Accident	17	
DNS	9	(Italy) Danilo Petrucci	IodaRacing Project	ART		Did not start		

=== Moto2 ===
Pos.	No.	Rider	Manufacturer	Laps	Time/Retired	Grid	Points
1	36	(Finland) Mika Kallio	Kalex	26	44:56.004	1	25
2	77	(Switzerland) Dominique Aegerter	Suter	26	+2.434	5	20
3	94	(Germany) Jonas Folger	Kalex	26	+3.668	7	16
4	53	(Spain) Esteve Rabat	Kalex	26	+5.431	6	13
5	40	(Spain) Maverick Viñales	Kalex	26	+9.786	8	11
6	39	(Spain) Luis Salom	Kalex	26	+11.356	3	10
7	19	(Belgium) Xavier Siméon	Suter	26	+18.112	12	9
8	5	(France) Johann Zarco	Caterham Suter	26	+21.508	10	8
9	11	(Germany) Sandro Cortese	Kalex	26	+21.608	2	7
10	12	(Switzerland) Thomas Lüthi	Suter	26	+22.811	4	6
11	95	(Australia) Anthony West	Speed Up	26	+43.284	24	5
12	81	(Spain) Jordi Torres	Suter	26	+43.405	22	4
13	88	(Spain) Ricard Cardús	Tech 3	26	+43.906	14	3
14	60	(Spain) Julián Simón	Kalex	26	+44.100	16	2
15	4	(Switzerland) Randy Krummenacher	Suter	26	+44.434	25	1
16	49	(Spain) Axel Pons	Kalex	26	+44.708	28	
17	15	(San Marino) Alex de Angelis	Suter	26	+45.004	19	
18	54	(Italy) Mattia Pasini	Forward KLX	26	+45.987	18	
19	14	(Thailand) Ratthapark Wilairot	Caterham Suter	26	+47.440	17	
20	21	(Italy) Franco Morbidelli	Kalex	26	+57.176	23	
21	55	(Malaysia) Hafizh Syahrin	Kalex	26	+1:02.628	26	
22	45	(Japan) Tetsuta Nagashima	TSR	26	+1:03.716	29	
23	97	(Spain) Román Ramos	Speed Up	26	+1:04.330	33	
24	25	(Malaysia) Azlan Shah	Kalex	26	+1:05.423	31	
25	57	(Spain) Edgar Pons	Kalex	26	+1:05.657	34	
26	8	(United Kingdom) Gino Rea	Suter	26	+1:06.666	27	
27	70	(Switzerland) Robin Mulhauser	Suter	26	+2:00.211	30	
28	10	(Thailand) Thitipong Warokorn	Kalex	26	+2:00.222	32	
Ret	30	(Japan) Takaaki Nakagami	Kalex	25	Accident	13	
Ret	3	(Italy) Simone Corsi	Forward KLX	24	Accident	11	
Ret	22	(United Kingdom) Sam Lowes	Speed Up	18	Retirement	15	
Ret	23	(Germany) Marcel Schrötter	Tech 3	11	Accident	9	
Ret	96	(France) Louis Rossi	Kalex	8	Accident	21	
Ret	7	(Italy) Lorenzo Baldassarri	Suter	7	Accident	20	
DNS	18	(Spain) Nicolás Terol	Suter		Did not start		
OFFICIAL MOTO2 REPORT

=== Moto3 ===
Pos.	No.	Rider	Manufacturer	Laps	Time/Retired	Grid	Points
1	5	(Italy) Romano Fenati	KTM	23	41:28.584	10	25
2	7	(Spain) Efrén Vázquez	Honda	23	+0.144	7	20
3	42	(Spain) Álex Rins	Honda	23	+0.147	3	16
4	8	(Australia) Jack Miller	KTM	23	+1.224	1	13
5	32	(Spain) Isaac Viñales	KTM	23	+1.244	4	11
6	84	(Czech Republic) Jakub Kornfeil	KTM	23	+1.857	11	10
7	12	(Spain) Álex Márquez	Honda	23	+3.808	5	9
8	21	(Italy) Francesco Bagnaia	KTM	23	+6.631	6	8
9	33	(Italy) Enea Bastianini	KTM	23	+11.944	15	7
10	31	(Finland) Niklas Ajo	Husqvarna	23	+12.204	8	6
11	52	(United Kingdom) Danny Kent	Husqvarna	23	+12.685	13	5
12	10	(France) Alexis Masbou	Honda	23	+12.839	18	4
13	17	(United Kingdom) John McPhee	Honda	23	+12.870	9	3
14	44	(Portugal) Miguel Oliveira	Mahindra	23	+14.793	12	2
15	65	(Germany) Philipp Öttl	Kalex KTM	23	+14.907	14	1
16	58	(Spain) Juan Francisco Guevara	Kalex KTM	23	+15.586	17	
17	6	(Spain) María Herrera	Honda	23	+15.753	16	
18	19	(Italy) Alessandro Tonucci	Mahindra	23	+23.121	22	
19	98	(Czech Republic) Karel Hanika	KTM	23	+23.741	29	
20	63	(Malaysia) Zulfahmi Khairuddin	Honda	23	+31.160	23	
21	24	(Spain) Marcos Ramírez	KTM	23	+31.437	21	
22	51	(Netherlands) Bryan Schouten	Mahindra	23	+36.861	27	
23	22	(Spain) Ana Carrasco	Kalex KTM	23	+47.525	28	
24	38	(Malaysia) Hafiq Azmi	KTM	23	+47.813	32	
25	3	(Italy) Matteo Ferrari	Mahindra	23	+48.115	31	
26	43	(Germany) Luca Grünwald	Kalex KTM	23	+48.141	33	
27	95	(France) Jules Danilo	Mahindra	23	+48.693	34	
28	4	(Venezuela) Gabriel Ramos	Kalex KTM	23	+1:22.490	35	
Ret	11	(Belgium) Livio Loi	Kalex KTM	16	Accident	24	
Ret	41	(South Africa) Brad Binder	Mahindra	15	Retirement	30	
Ret	9	(Netherlands) Scott Deroue	Kalex KTM	14	Accident	26	
Ret	91	(Argentina) Gabriel Rodrigo	KTM	7	Accident	19	
Ret	23	(Italy) Niccolò Antonelli	KTM	2	Retirement	2	
Ret	61	(Australia) Arthur Sissis	Mahindra	2	Retirement	25	
Ret	57	(Brazil) Eric Granado	KTM	0	Accident	20	
OFFICIAL MOTO3 REPORT

== Championship standings after the race (MotoGP) ==
Below are the standings for the top five riders and constructors after round four has concluded.

Riders' Championship standings

Pos.	Rider	Points
1	(Spain) Marc Márquez	100
2	(Spain) Dani Pedrosa	72
3	(Italy) Valentino Rossi	61
4	(Italy) Andrea Dovizioso	45
5	(Spain) Jorge Lorenzo	35

Constructors' Championship standings

Pos.	Constructor	Points
1	(Japan) Honda	100
2	(Japan) Yamaha	67
3	(Italy) Ducati	48
4	(Switzerland) Forward Yamaha	30
5	(Italy) ART	2

- Note: Only the top five positions are included for both sets of standings.

Previous race: 2014 Argentine Grand Prix	FIM Grand Prix World Championship; 2014 season	Next race: 2014 French Grand Prix
Previous race: 2013 Spanish Grand Prix	Spanish motorcycle Grand Prix	Next race: 2015 Spanish Grand Prix
