= 2014 Indianapolis motorcycle Grand Prix =

2014 Indianapolis Grand Prix
Race details
- Race 10 of 18 races in the 2014 Grand Prix motorcycle racing season
- Date: August 10, 2014
- Official name: Red Bull Indianapolis Grand Prix
- Location: Indianapolis Motor Speedway
- Course: Permanent racing facility; 4.170 km (2.591 mi)

MotoGP
Pole position
Rider	(Spain) Marc Márquez	Honda
Time	1:31.619	
Fastest lap
Rider	(Spain) Marc Márquez	Honda
Time	1:32.831 on lap 17	
Podium
First	(Spain) Marc Márquez	Honda
Second	(Spain) Jorge Lorenzo	Yamaha
Third	(Italy) Valentino Rossi	Yamaha

Moto2
Pole position
Rider	(Finland) Mika Kallio	Kalex
Time	1:36.883	
Fastest lap
Rider	(Finland) Mika Kallio	Kalex
Time	1:37.275 on lap 13	
Podium
First	(Finland) Mika Kallio	Kalex
Second	(Spain) Maverick Viñales	Kalex
Third	(Switzerland) Dominique Aegerter	Suter

Moto3
Pole position
Rider	(Australia) Jack Miller	KTM
Time	1:40.727	
Fastest lap
Rider	(Spain) Álex Rins	Honda
Time	1:40.800 on lap 3	
Podium
First	(Spain) Efrén Vázquez	Honda
Second	(Italy) Romano Fenati	KTM
Third	(Australia) Jack Miller	KTM

The 2014 Indianapolis motorcycle Grand Prix was the tenth round of the 2014 MotoGP season. It was held at the Indianapolis Motor Speedway in Indianapolis on August 10, 2014.

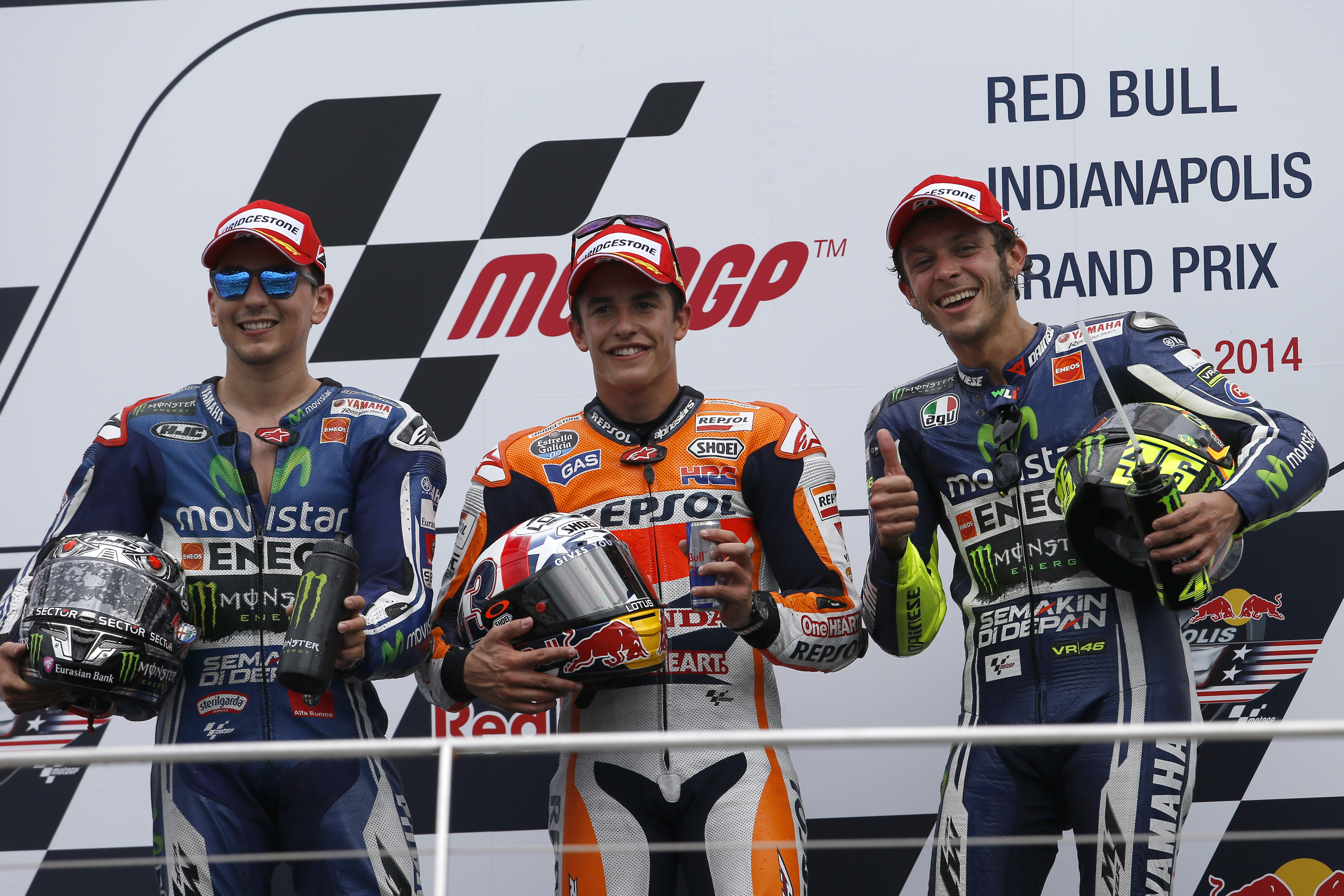
Jorge Lorenzo, Marc Márquez and Valentino Rossi, celebrating on the podium after finishing in second, first and third place at the MotoGP race.

== Classification ==
=== MotoGP ===
Pos.	No.	Rider	Team	Manufacturer	Laps	Time/Retired	Grid	Points
1	93	(Spain) Marc Márquez	Repsol Honda Team	Honda	27	42:07.041	1	25
2	99	(Spain) Jorge Lorenzo	Movistar Yamaha MotoGP	Yamaha	27	+1.803	3	20
3	46	(Italy) Valentino Rossi	Movistar Yamaha MotoGP	Yamaha	27	+6.558	5	16
4	26	(Spain) Dani Pedrosa	Repsol Honda Team	Honda	27	+10.016	8	13
5	44	(Spain) Pol Espargaró	Monster Yamaha Tech 3	Yamaha	27	+17.807	6	11
6	38	(United Kingdom) Bradley Smith	Monster Yamaha Tech 3	Yamaha	27	+19.604	9	10
7	4	(Italy) Andrea Dovizioso	Ducati Team	Ducati	27	+20.759	2	9
8	35	(United Kingdom) Cal Crutchlow	Ducati Team	Ducati	27	+39.796	12	8
9	45	(United Kingdom) Scott Redding	Go&Fun Honda Gresini	Honda	27	+40.507	11	7
10	7	(Japan) Hiroshi Aoyama	Drive M7 Aspar	Honda	27	+55.760	18	6
11	17	(Czech Republic) Karel Abraham	Cardion AB Motoracing	Honda	27	+1:05.130	21	5
12	63	(France) Mike Di Meglio	Avintia Racing	Avintia	27	+1:05.346	19	4
13	5	(United States) Colin Edwards	NGM Forward Racing	Forward Yamaha	27	+1:08.919	15	3
14	70	(United Kingdom) Michael Laverty	Paul Bird Motorsport	PBM	27	+1:09.203	23	2
15	23	(Australia) Broc Parkes	Paul Bird Motorsport	PBM	27	+1:30.613	22	1
Ret	2	(United Kingdom) Leon Camier	Drive M7 Aspar	Honda	19	Retirement	16	
Ret	29	(Italy) Andrea Iannone	Pramac Racing	Ducati	14	Retirement	7	
Ret	41	(Spain) Aleix Espargaró	NGM Forward Racing	Forward Yamaha	12	Retirement	4	
Ret	6	(Germany) Stefan Bradl	LCR Honda MotoGP	Honda	12	Accident	10	
Ret	9	(Italy) Danilo Petrucci	Octo IodaRacing Team	ART	6	Retirement	17	
Ret	8	(Spain) Héctor Barberá	Avintia Racing	Avintia	5	Retirement	20	
Ret	68	(Colombia) Yonny Hernández	Energy T.I. Pramac Racing	Ducati	0	Accident	13	
Ret	19	(Spain) Álvaro Bautista	Go&Fun Honda Gresini	Honda	0	Accident	14	

=== Moto2 ===
The first attempt to run the race was interrupted following an incident involving Randy Krummenacher, Mattia Pasini, Azlan Shah and Anthony West. For the restart, the race distance was reduced from 25 to 16 laps.

Pos.	No.	Rider	Manufacturer	Laps	Time/Retired	Grid	Points
1	36	(Finland) Mika Kallio	Kalex	16	26:07.410	1	25
2	40	(Spain) Maverick Viñales	Kalex	16	+1.380	6	20
3	77	(Switzerland) Dominique Aegerter	Suter	16	+1.696	3	16
4	53	(Spain) Esteve Rabat	Kalex	16	+2.559	2	13
5	3	(Italy) Simone Corsi	Kalex	16	+6.648	5	11
6	11	(Germany) Sandro Cortese	Kalex	16	+18.639	8	10
7	55	(Malaysia) Hafizh Syahrin	Kalex	16	+18.674	20	9
8	15	(San Marino) Alex de Angelis	Suter	16	+18.992	21	8
9	95	(Australia) Anthony West	Speed Up	16	+19.487	22	7
10	5	(France) Johann Zarco	Caterham Suter	16	+19.922	4	6
11	30	(Japan) Takaaki Nakagami	Kalex	16	+20.013	7	5
12	81	(Spain) Jordi Torres	Suter	16	+20.963	12	4
13	96	(France) Louis Rossi	Kalex	16	+22.672	27	3
14	23	(Germany) Marcel Schrötter	Tech 3	16	+23.836	24	2
15	88	(Spain) Ricard Cardús	Tech 3	16	+25.325	26	1
16	49	(Spain) Axel Pons	Kalex	16	+25.514	17	
17	7	(Italy) Lorenzo Baldassarri	Suter	16	+28.980	32	
18	94	(Germany) Jonas Folger	Kalex	16	+32.962	19	
19	97	(Spain) Román Ramos	Speed Up	16	+36.564	34	
20	25	(Malaysia) Azlan Shah	Kalex	16	+36.907	28	
21	18	(Spain) Nicolás Terol	Suter	16	+38.624	29	
22	70	(Switzerland) Robin Mulhauser	Suter	16	+39.669	31	
23	45	(Japan) Tetsuta Nagashima	TSR	16	+39.723	30	
24	22	(United Kingdom) Sam Lowes	Speed Up	16	+44.499	10	
25	8	(United Kingdom) Gino Rea	Suter	16	+1:07.790	25	
26	39	(Spain) Luis Salom	Kalex	16	+1:29.010	11	
27	10	(Thailand) Thitipong Warokorn	Kalex	16	+1:34.244	33	
28	2	(United States) Josh Herrin	Caterham Suter	13	+3 laps	23	
Ret	21	(Italy) Franco Morbidelli	Kalex	4	Accident	13	
Ret	19	(Belgium) Xavier Siméon	Suter	3	Accident	16	
Ret	12	(Switzerland) Thomas Lüthi	Suter	0	Accident	9	
Ret	60	(Spain) Julián Simón	Kalex	0	Accident	14	
DNS	54	(Italy) Mattia Pasini	Kalex	0	Did not restart	15	
DNS	4	(Switzerland) Randy Krummenacher	Suter	0	Did not restart	18	
OFFICIAL MOTO2 REPORT

=== Moto3 ===
Pos.	No.	Rider	Manufacturer	Laps	Time/Retired	Grid	Points
1	7	(Spain) Efrén Vázquez	Honda	23	39:12.977	2	25
2	5	(Italy) Romano Fenati	KTM	23	+0.065	4	20
3	8	(Australia) Jack Miller	KTM	23	+0.219	1	16
4	10	(France) Alexis Masbou	Honda	23	+0.372	11	13
5	42	(Spain) Álex Rins	Honda	23	+0.719	12	11
6	12	(Spain) Álex Márquez	Honda	23	+1.013	3	10
7	44	(Portugal) Miguel Oliveira	Mahindra	23	+1.310	18	9
8	58	(Spain) Juan Francisco Guevara	Kalex KTM	23	+1.895	5	8
9	41	(South Africa) Brad Binder	Mahindra	23	+2.037	19	7
10	84	(Czech Republic) Jakub Kornfeil	KTM	23	+2.261	14	6
11	33	(Italy) Enea Bastianini	KTM	23	+3.432	16	5
12	52	(United Kingdom) Danny Kent	Husqvarna	23	+4.439	17	4
13	98	(Czech Republic) Karel Hanika	KTM	23	+9.598	10	3
14	99	(Spain) Jorge Navarro	Kalex KTM	23	+9.680	6	2
15	63	(Malaysia) Zulfahmi Khairuddin	Honda	23	+16.399	15	1
16	95	(France) Jules Danilo	Mahindra	23	+16.431	26	
17	32	(Spain) Isaac Viñales	KTM	23	+16.605	22	
18	23	(Italy) Niccolò Antonelli	KTM	23	+16.661	20	
19	43	(Germany) Luca Grünwald	Kalex KTM	23	+20.791	21	
20	65	(Germany) Philipp Öttl	Kalex KTM	23	+21.023	27	
21	61	(Australia) Arthur Sissis	Mahindra	23	+23.846	23	
22	57	(Brazil) Eric Granado	KTM	23	+24.100	25	
23	9	(Netherlands) Scott Deroue	Kalex KTM	23	+36.525	30	
24	38	(Malaysia) Hafiq Azmi	KTM	23	+45.844	31	
25	55	(Italy) Andrea Locatelli	Mahindra	23	+50.228	29	
26	22	(Spain) Ana Carrasco	Kalex KTM	23	+52.806	33	
27	51	(Netherlands) Bryan Schouten	Mahindra	23	+1:00.639	24	
Ret	21	(Italy) Francesco Bagnaia	KTM	13	Retirement	8	
Ret	19	(Italy) Alessandro Tonucci	Mahindra	13	Retirement	9	
Ret	31	(Finland) Niklas Ajo	Husqvarna	9	Accident	13	
Ret	4	(Venezuela) Gabriel Ramos	Kalex KTM	2	Accident	32	
Ret	3	(Italy) Matteo Ferrari	Mahindra	2	Accident	28	
Ret	17	(United Kingdom) John McPhee	Honda	0	Accident	7	
OFFICIAL MOTO3 REPORT

== Championship standings after the race (MotoGP) ==
Below are the standings for the top five riders and constructors after round ten has concluded.

Riders' Championship standings

Pos.	Rider	Points
1	(Spain) Marc Márquez	250
2	(Spain) Dani Pedrosa	161
3	(Italy) Valentino Rossi	157
4	(Spain) Jorge Lorenzo	117
5	(Italy) Andrea Dovizioso	108

Constructors' Championship standings

Pos.	Constructor	Points
1	(Japan) Honda	250
2	(Japan) Yamaha	174
3	(Italy) Ducati	114
4	(Switzerland) Forward Yamaha	80
5	(United Kingdom) PBM	8

- Note: Only the top five positions are included for both sets of standings.

Previous race: 2014 German Grand Prix	FIM Grand Prix World Championship; 2014 season	Next race: 2014 Czech Republic Grand Prix
Previous race: 2013 Indianapolis Grand Prix	Indianapolis motorcycle Grand Prix	Next race: 2015 Indianapolis Grand Prix
