= 2014 Motorcycle Grand Prix of the Americas =

Racing tournament

(United States) 2014 Grand Prix of the Americas
Race details
- Race 2 of 18 races in the 2014 Grand Prix motorcycle racing season
- Date: April 13, 2014
- Official name: Red Bull Grand Prix of the Americas
- Location: Circuit of the Americas
- Course: Permanent racing facility; 5.513 km (3.426 mi)

MotoGP
Pole position
Rider	(Spain) Marc Márquez	Honda
Time	2:02.773	
Fastest lap
Rider	(Spain) Marc Márquez	Honda
Time	2:03.575 on lap 3	
Podium
First	(Spain) Marc Márquez	Honda
Second	(Spain) Dani Pedrosa	Honda
Third	(Italy) Andrea Dovizioso	Ducati

Moto2
Pole position
Rider	(Spain) Esteve Rabat	Kalex
Time	2:10.135	
Fastest lap
Rider	(Spain) Maverick Viñales	Kalex
Time	2:10.103 on lap 16	
Podium
First	(Spain) Maverick Viñales	Kalex
Second	(Spain) Esteve Rabat	Kalex
Third	(Switzerland) Dominique Aegerter	Suter

Moto3
Pole position
Rider	(Australia) Jack Miller	KTM
Time	2:16.342	
Fastest lap
Rider	(Spain) Álex Márquez	Honda
Time	2:16.354 on lap 3	
Podium
First	(Australia) Jack Miller	KTM
Second	(Italy) Romano Fenati	KTM
Third	(Spain) Efrén Vázquez	Honda

The 2014 Motorcycle Grand Prix of the Americas was the second round of the 2014 MotoGP season. It was held at the Circuit of the Americas in Austin on April 13, 2014.

== Classification ==
=== MotoGP ===
Pos.	No.	Rider	Team	Manufacturer	Laps	Time/Retired	Grid	Points
1	93	(Spain) Marc Márquez	Repsol Honda Team	Honda	21	43:33.430	1	25
2	26	(Spain) Dani Pedrosa	Repsol Honda Team	Honda	21	+4.124	2	20
3	4	(Italy) Andrea Dovizioso	Ducati Team	Ducati	21	+20.976	10	16
4	6	(Germany) Stefan Bradl	LCR Honda MotoGP	Honda	21	+22.790	3	13
5	38	(United Kingdom) Bradley Smith	Monster Yamaha Tech 3	Yamaha	21	+22.963	8	11
6	44	(Spain) Pol Espargaró	Monster Yamaha Tech 3	Yamaha	21	+26.567	11	10
7	29	(Italy) Andrea Iannone	Pramac Racing	Ducati	21	+28.257	9	9
8	46	(Italy) Valentino Rossi	Movistar Yamaha MotoGP	Yamaha	21	+45.519	6	8
9	41	(Spain) Aleix Espargaró	NGM Forward Racing	Forward Yamaha	21	+47.605	4	7
10	99	(Spain) Jorge Lorenzo	Movistar Yamaha MotoGP	Yamaha	21	+49.111	5	6
11	69	(United States) Nicky Hayden	Drive M7 Aspar	Honda	21	+1:00.735	14	5
12	7	(Japan) Hiroshi Aoyama	Drive M7 Aspar	Honda	21	+1:03.954	16	4
13	68	(Colombia) Yonny Hernández	Energy T.I. Pramac Racing	Ducati	21	+1:07.333	15	3
14	17	(Czech Republic) Karel Abraham	Cardion AB Motoracing	Honda	21	+1:27.972	17	2
15	8	(Spain) Héctor Barberá	Avintia Racing	Avintia	21	+1:32.376	18	1
16	70	(United Kingdom) Michael Laverty	Paul Bird Motorsport	PBM	21	+1:32.543	20	
17	9	(Italy) Danilo Petrucci	IodaRacing Project	ART	21	+1:39.176	22	
18	63	(France) Mike Di Meglio	Avintia Racing	Avintia	21	+1:51.962	23	
Ret	45	(United Kingdom) Scott Redding	Go&Fun Honda Gresini	Honda	19	Accident	13	
Ret	5	(United States) Colin Edwards	NGM Forward Racing	Forward Yamaha	17	Retirement	19	
Ret	35	(United Kingdom) Cal Crutchlow	Ducati Team	Ducati	12	Accident	7	
Ret	19	(Spain) Álvaro Bautista	Go&Fun Honda Gresini	Honda	9	Accident	12	
Ret	23	(Australia) Broc Parkes	Paul Bird Motorsport	PBM	8	Retirement	21	

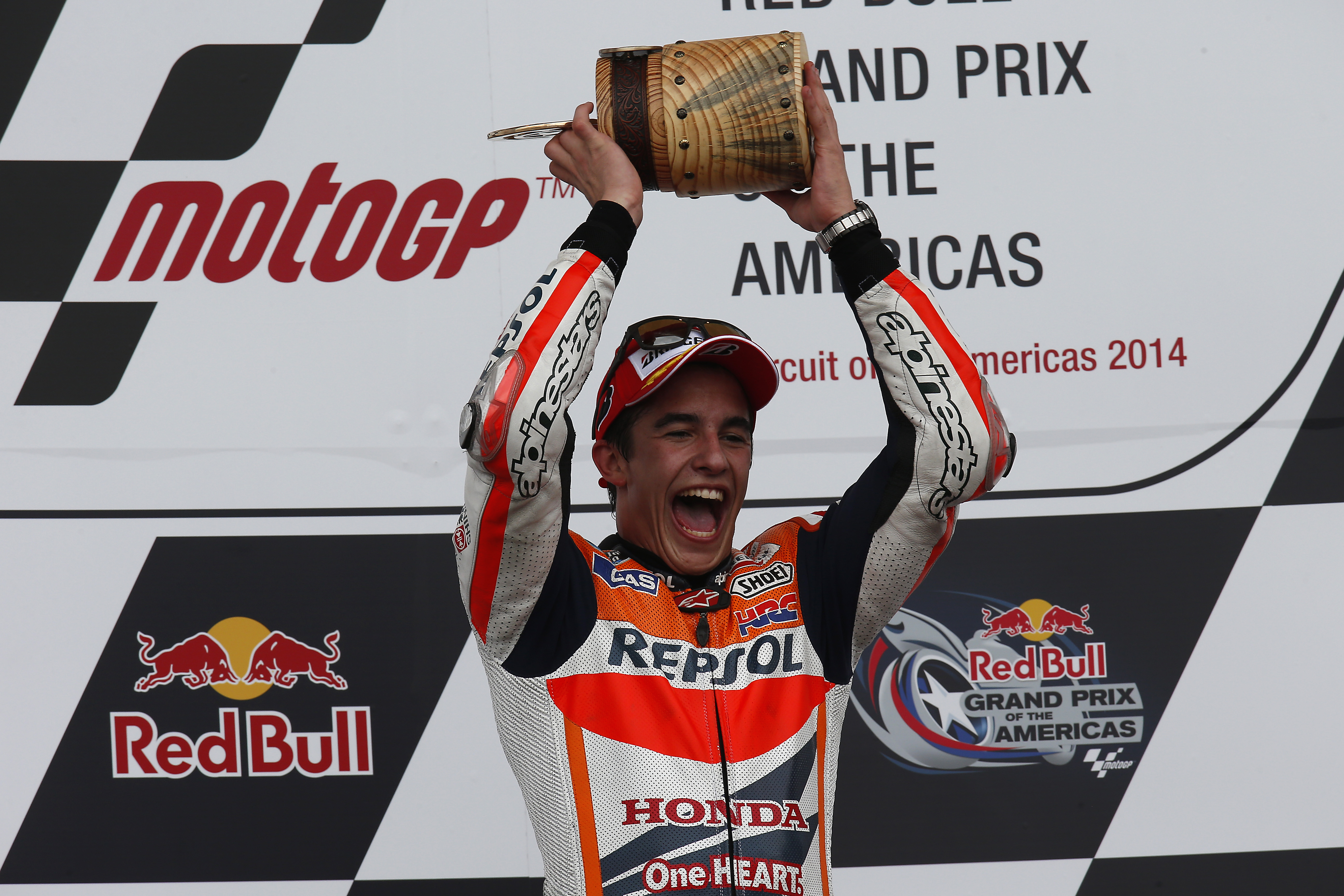
Marc Márquez, holding his first place trophy on the podium after winning the MotoGP race.

=== Moto2 ===
Pos.	No.	Rider	Manufacturer	Laps	Time/Retired	Grid	Points
1	40	(Spain) Maverick Viñales	Kalex	19	41:31.520	6	25
2	53	(Spain) Esteve Rabat	Kalex	19	+4.009	1	20
3	77	(Switzerland) Dominique Aegerter	Suter	19	+7.323	3	16
4	36	(Finland) Mika Kallio	Kalex	19	+8.590	11	13
5	3	(Italy) Simone Corsi	Forward KLX	19	+9.934	8	11
6	12	(Switzerland) Thomas Lüthi	Suter	19	+16.987	13	10
7	95	(Australia) Anthony West	Speed Up	19	+17.561	19	9
8	15	(San Marino) Alex de Angelis	Suter	19	+18.948	14	8
9	23	(Germany) Marcel Schrötter	Tech 3	19	+19.720	10	7
10	88	(Spain) Ricard Cardús	Tech 3	19	+24.552	22	6
11	30	(Japan) Takaaki Nakagami	Kalex	19	+28.463	9	5
12	54	(Italy) Mattia Pasini	Forward KLX	19	+43.955	20	4
13	4	(Switzerland) Randy Krummenacher	Suter	19	+44.344	23	3
14	11	(Germany) Sandro Cortese	Kalex	19	+45.666	15	2
15	55	(Malaysia) Hafizh Syahrin	Kalex	19	+49.291	28	1
16	22	(United Kingdom) Sam Lowes	Speed Up	19	+51.154	17	
17	21	(Italy) Franco Morbidelli	Kalex	19	+51.331	21	
18	25	(Malaysia) Azlan Shah	Kalex	19	+51.683	33	
19	49	(Spain) Axel Pons	Kalex	19	+52.113	25	
20	45	(Japan) Tetsuta Nagashima	TSR	19	+1:02.103	30	
21	97	(Spain) Román Ramos	Speed Up	19	+1:02.346	32	
22	10	(Thailand) Thitipong Warokorn	Kalex	19	+1:03.495	31	
23	60	(Spain) Julián Simón	Kalex	19	+1:04.944	5	
24	70	(Switzerland) Robin Mulhauser	Suter	19	+1:09.941	29	
25	8	(United Kingdom) Gino Rea	Suter	19	+1:20.330	34	
26	81	(Spain) Jordi Torres	Suter	19	+1:33.781	12	
Ret	19	(Belgium) Xavier Siméon	Suter	17	Accident	4	
Ret	18	(Spain) Nicolás Terol	Suter	16	Retirement	26	
Ret	96	(France) Louis Rossi	Kalex	8	Accident	18	
Ret	2	(United States) Josh Herrin	Caterham Suter	5	Accident	27	
Ret	94	(Germany) Jonas Folger	Kalex	4	Accident	7	
Ret	7	(Italy) Lorenzo Baldassarri	Suter	3	Accident	24	
Ret	5	(France) Johann Zarco	Caterham Suter	2	Retirement	2	
Ret	39	(Spain) Luis Salom	Kalex	0	Accident	16	
OFFICIAL MOTO2 REPORT

=== Moto3 ===
Pos.	No.	Rider	Manufacturer	Laps	Time/Retired	Grid	Points
1	8	(Australia) Jack Miller	KTM	18	41:06.659	1	25
2	5	(Italy) Romano Fenati	KTM	18	+0.069	8	20
3	7	(Spain) Efrén Vázquez	Honda	18	+0.172	2	16
4	42	(Spain) Álex Rins	Honda	18	+7.182	3	13
5	84	(Czech Republic) Jakub Kornfeil	KTM	18	+7.264	6	11
6	10	(France) Alexis Masbou	Honda	18	+20.107	7	10
7	21	(Italy) Francesco Bagnaia	KTM	18	+20.381	14	9
8	52	(United Kingdom) Danny Kent	Husqvarna	18	+23.981	16	8
9	17	(United Kingdom) John McPhee	Honda	18	+24.032	15	7
10	98	(Czech Republic) Karel Hanika	KTM	18	+24.222	17	6
11	58	(Spain) Juan Francisco Guevara	Kalex KTM	18	+24.817	13	5
12	11	(Belgium) Livio Loi	Kalex KTM	18	+34.634	24	4
13	33	(Italy) Enea Bastianini	KTM	18	+34.955	21	3
14	31	(Finland) Niklas Ajo	Husqvarna	18	+35.020	12	2
15	44	(Portugal) Miguel Oliveira	Mahindra	18	+35.436	18	1
16	19	(Italy) Alessandro Tonucci	Mahindra	18	+38.306	11	
17	63	(Malaysia) Zulfahmi Khairuddin	Honda	18	+38.536	20	
18	57	(Brazil) Eric Granado	KTM	18	+49.325	19	
19	9	(Netherlands) Scott Deroue	Kalex KTM	18	+1:02.422	25	
20	65	(Germany) Philipp Öttl	Kalex KTM	18	+1:02.609	22	
21	22	(Spain) Ana Carrasco	Kalex KTM	18	+1:02.695	31	
22	95	(France) Jules Danilo	Mahindra	18	+1:08.860	32	
23	43	(Germany) Luca Grünwald	Kalex KTM	18	+1:18.905	27	
24	38	(Malaysia) Hafiq Azmi	KTM	18	+2:04.082	30	
25	55	(Italy) Andrea Locatelli	Mahindra	17	+1 lap	23	
26	51	(Netherlands) Bryan Schouten	Mahindra	17	+1 lap	28	
Ret	12	(Spain) Álex Márquez	Honda	17	Accident	4	
Ret	4	(Venezuela) Gabriel Ramos	Kalex KTM	15	Retirement	33	
Ret	23	(Italy) Niccolò Antonelli	KTM	7	Accident	5	
Ret	41	(South Africa) Brad Binder	Mahindra	7	Retirement	10	
Ret	32	(Spain) Isaac Viñales	KTM	6	Accident	9	
Ret	61	(Australia) Arthur Sissis	Mahindra	0	Accident	26	
Ret	3	(Italy) Matteo Ferrari	Mahindra	0	Accident	29	
OFFICIAL MOTO3 REPORT

== Championship standings after the race (MotoGP) ==
Below are the standings for the top five riders and constructors after round two has concluded.

Riders' Championship standings

Pos.	Rider	Points
1	(Spain) Marc Márquez	50
2	(Spain) Dani Pedrosa	36
3	(Italy) Valentino Rossi	28
4	(Italy) Andrea Dovizioso	27
5	(Spain) Aleix Espargaró	20

Constructors' Championship standings

Pos.	Constructor	Points
1	(Japan) Honda	50
2	(Japan) Yamaha	31
3	(Italy) Ducati	27
4	(Switzerland) Forward Yamaha	20
5	(Italy) ART	2

- Note: Only the top five positions are included for both sets of standings.

Previous race: 2014 Qatar Grand Prix	FIM Grand Prix World Championship; 2014 season	Next race: 2014 Argentine Grand Prix
Previous race: 2013 Grand Prix of the Americas	Motorcycle Grand Prix of the Americas	Next race: 2015 Grand Prix of the Americas
