= Sena Yamada =

Japanese motorcycle racer

- Nationality: Japanese
- Born: 17 February 1994 (age 32); Tochigi Prefecture, Japan
- Current team: RAMA Honda by NTS T.Pro Ten10
- Bike number: 17
Motorcycle racing career statistics
Moto3 World Championship
Active years	2013–2015
Manufacturers	Honda
2015 championship position	NC (0 pts)
Starts / Wins / Podiums / Poles / F. laps / Points; 3 / 0 / 0 / 0 / 0 / 0

Sena Yamada (山田 誓己, Yamada Sena; born 17 February 1994 in Tochigi Prefecture) is a Japanese Grand Prix motorcycle racer. He currently competes in the Asia Road Race Supersport 600 Championship aboard a Honda CBR600RR. In 2016, he currently competes in the FIM CEV Moto2 European Championship aboard a Kalex Moto2.

Yamada has also previously competed in his native Japan, in the Motegi GP125 Championship, the Tsukuba GP125 Championship, the All Japan Road Race GP125 Championship and the All Japan Road Race J-GP3 Championship, where he was champion in 2013 and 2014. In 2015, Yamada moved to Europe and competed in the FIM CEV Moto3 Junior World Championship.

== Career statistics ==
=== FIM CEV Moto3 Junior World Championship ===
==== Races by year ====
(key) (Races in bold indicate pole position, races in italics indicate fastest lap)

Year	Bike	1	2	3	4	5	6	7	8	9	10	11	12	Pos	Pts
2014	TSR Honda	JER1	JER2	LMS	ARA	CAT1	CAT2	ALB	NAV; 34	ALG	VAL1; Ret	VAL2; 18		NC	0
2015	Honda	ALG; 12	LMS; 4	CAT1; Ret	CAT2; 6	ARA1; Ret	ARA2; 9	ALB; 16	NAV; 9	JER1; 6	JER2; 8	VAL1; 8	VAL2; 6	10th	77

=== FIM CEV Moto2 European Championship ===
==== Races by year ====
(key) (Races in bold indicate pole position, races in italics indicate fastest lap)

Year	Bike	1	2	3	4	5	6	7	8	9	10	11	Pos	Pts
2016	Kalex	VAL1; 15	VAL2; Ret	ARA1; 11	ARA2; 8	CAT1; 8	CAT2; 14	ALB; 8	ALG1; 20	ALG2; Ret	JER; Ret	VAL	18th	32

=== Grand Prix motorcycle racing ===
==== By season ====
Season	Class	Motorcycle	Team	Race	Win	Podium	Pole	FLap	Pts	Plcd
2013	Moto3	Honda	Team Plus One & Endurance	1	0	0	0	0	0	NC
2014	Moto3	Honda	Liberto Plusone & Endurance	1	0	0	0	0	0	NC
2015	Moto3	Honda	Estrella Galicia 0,0	1	0	0	0	0	0	NC
Total				**3**	**0**	**0**	**0**	**0**	**0**	

==== Races by year ====
Year	Class	Bike	1	2	3	4	5	6	7	8	9	10	11	12	13	14	15	16	17	18	Pos	Points
2013	Moto3	Honda	QAT	AME	SPA	FRA	ITA	CAT	NED	GER	INP	CZE	GBR	RSM	ARA	MAL	AUS	JPN; 23	VAL		NC	0
2014	Moto3	Honda	QAT	AME	ARG	SPA	FRA	ITA	CAT	NED	GER	INP	CZE	GBR	RSM	ARA	JPN; Ret	AUS	MAL	VAL	NC	0
2015	Moto3	Honda	QAT	AME	ARG	SPA	FRA	ITA	CAT	NED	GER	INP	CZE	GBR	RSM	ARA; 18	JPN	AUS	MAL	VAL	NC	0
