= Martin Vanhaeren =

Belgian motorcycle racer

- Nationality: (Belgium) Belgian
- Born: 5 April 1998 (age 28)

Martin Vanhaeren (born 5 April 1998) is a Belgian motorcycle racer.

== Career ==
In 2016, Vanhaeren was scheduled to make his full-time Grand Prix debut in the Moto3 World Championship with CIP alongside the Japanese Tatsuki Suzuki on a Mahindra MGP3O, but later the Italian Fabio Spiranelli was announced in his place.

== Career statistics ==
=== FIM CEV Moto3 Junior World Championship ===
==== Races by year ====
(key) (Races in bold indicate pole position, races in italics indicate fastest lap)

Year	Bike	1	2	3	4	5	6	7	8	9	10	11	12	Pos	Pts
2014	Suter Honda	JER1; 36	JER2; 35	LMS; 32	ARA; 35	CAT1; 28	CAT2; 29	ALB; DNQ	NAV; 20	ALG; Ret	VAL1; 30	VAL2; Ret		NC	0
2015	FTR KTM	ALG; 11	LMS; 14	CAT1; 9	CAT2; 11	ARA1; 11	ARA2; Ret	ALB; Ret	NAV; 16	JER1; 17	JER2; 19	VAL1; 13	VAL2; 28	18th	27

=== Grand Prix motorcycle racing ===
==== By season ====
Season	Class	Motorcycle	Race	Win	Podium	Pole	FLap	Pts	Plcd
2016	Moto3	Mahindra	0	0	0	0	0	0	
Total			**0**	**0**	**0**	**0**	**0**	**0**	

==== Races by year ====
Yr	Class	Bike	1	2	3	4	5	6	7	8	9	10	11	12	13	14	15	16	17	18	Pos	Pts
2016	Moto3	Mahindra	QAT	ARG	AME	SPA	FRA	ITA	CAT	NED	GER	GBR	AUT	CZE	RSM	ARA	MAL	JPN	AUS	VAL	NC*	0*
