= Thomas van Leeuwen =

Dutch motorcycle racer

- Nationality: Dutch
- Born: 12 September 1994 (age 32); Hattem, Netherlands
Motorcycle racing career statistics
Moto3 World Championship
Active years	2013–2014
Manufacturers	Bakker Honda, Kalex KTM
Championships	0
2014 championship position	NC (0 pts)
Starts / Wins / Podiums / Poles / F. laps / Points; 2 / 0 / 0 / 0 / 0 / 0
125cc World Championship
Active years	2011
Manufacturers	Honda
Championships	0
2011 championship position	NC (0 pts)
Starts / Wins / Podiums / Poles / F. laps / Points; 1 / 0 / 0 / 0 / 0 / 0

Thomas van Leeuwen (born 12 September 1994) is a Dutch motorcycle racer. He won the Dutch ONK Moto3 Championship in 2013. In 2014 and 2015, he raced in the FIM CEV Moto3 Championship.

== Career statistics ==
=== Red Bull MotoGP Rookies Cup ===
==== Races by year ====
(key) (Races in bold indicate pole position, races in italics indicate fastest lap)

Year	1	2	3	4	5	6	7	8	Pos	Pts
2009	SPA1	SPA2	ITA; 19	NED; 17	GER	GBR	CZE1	CZE2	NC	0

=== FIM CEV Moto3 Junior World Championship ===
==== Races by year ====
(key) (Races in bold indicate pole position, races in italics indicate fastest lap)

Year	Bike	1	2	3	4	5	6	7	8	9	10	11	12	Pos	Pts
2014	Honda	JER1; 38	JER2; 38	LMS; Ret	ARA; 31	CAT1	CAT2	ALB	NAV; 29	ALG	VAL1; 24	VAL2; 28		NC	0
2015	Kalex KTM	ALG	LMS	CAT1; 10	CAT2; 20	ARA1	ARA2	ALB; Ret	NAV	JER1	JER2	VAL1	VAL2	28th	6

=== Grand Prix motorcycle racing ===
==== By season ====
Season	Class	Motorcycle	Team	Race	Win	Podium	Pole	FLap	Pts	Plcd
2011	125cc	Honda	Racing Team Van Leeuwen	1	0	0	0	0	0	NC
2013	Moto3	Bakker Honda	Racing Team Van Leeuwen	1	0	0	0	0	0	NC
2014	Moto3	Kalex KTM	71Workx.com Racing Team	1	0	0	0	0	0	NC
Total				**3**	**0**	**0**	**0**	**0**	**0**	

=== Races by year ===
Year	Class	Bike	1	2	3	4	5	6	7	8	9	10	11	12	13	14	15	16	17	18	Pos	Points
2011	125cc	Honda	QAT	SPA	POR	FRA	CAT	GBR	NED; 28	ITA	GER	CZE	INP	RSM	ARA	JPN	AUS	MAL	VAL		NC	0
2013	Moto3	Bakker Honda	QAT	AME	SPA	FRA	ITA	CAT	NED; Ret	GER	INP	CZE	GBR	RSM	ARA	MAL	AUS	JPN	VAL		NC	0
2014	Moto3	Kalex KTM	QAT	AME	ARG	SPA	FRA	ITA	CAT	NED; 23	GER	INP	CZE	GBR	RSM	ARA	JPN	AUS	MAL	VAL	NC	0
