= 2014 FIM CEV Moto3 International Championship =

2014 FIM CEV Moto3 Junior World Championship
Previous:	2013	Next:	2015
Support series: FIM CEV Moto2 European Championship; FIM CEV Superbike European Championship

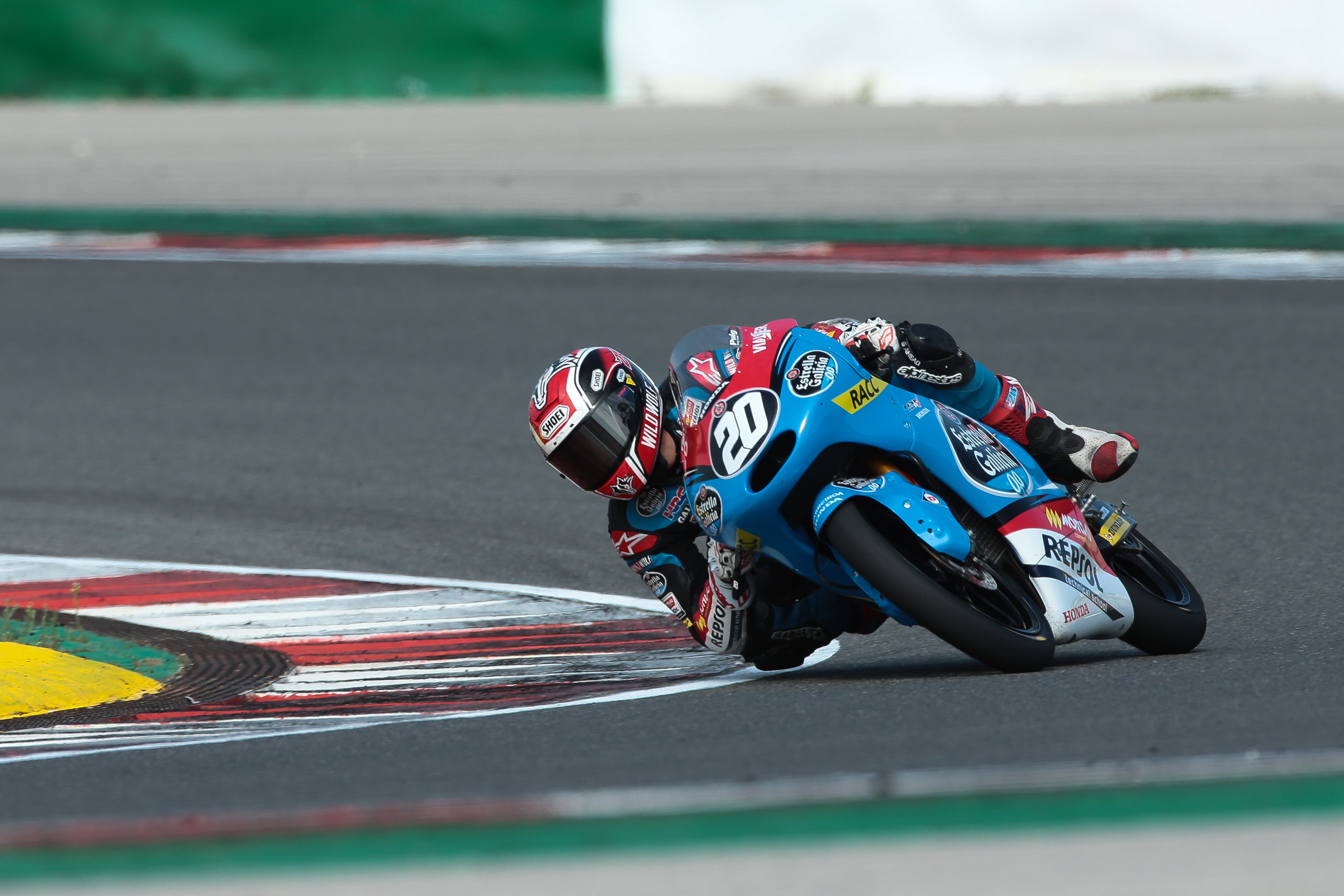
2014 champion Fabio Quartararo

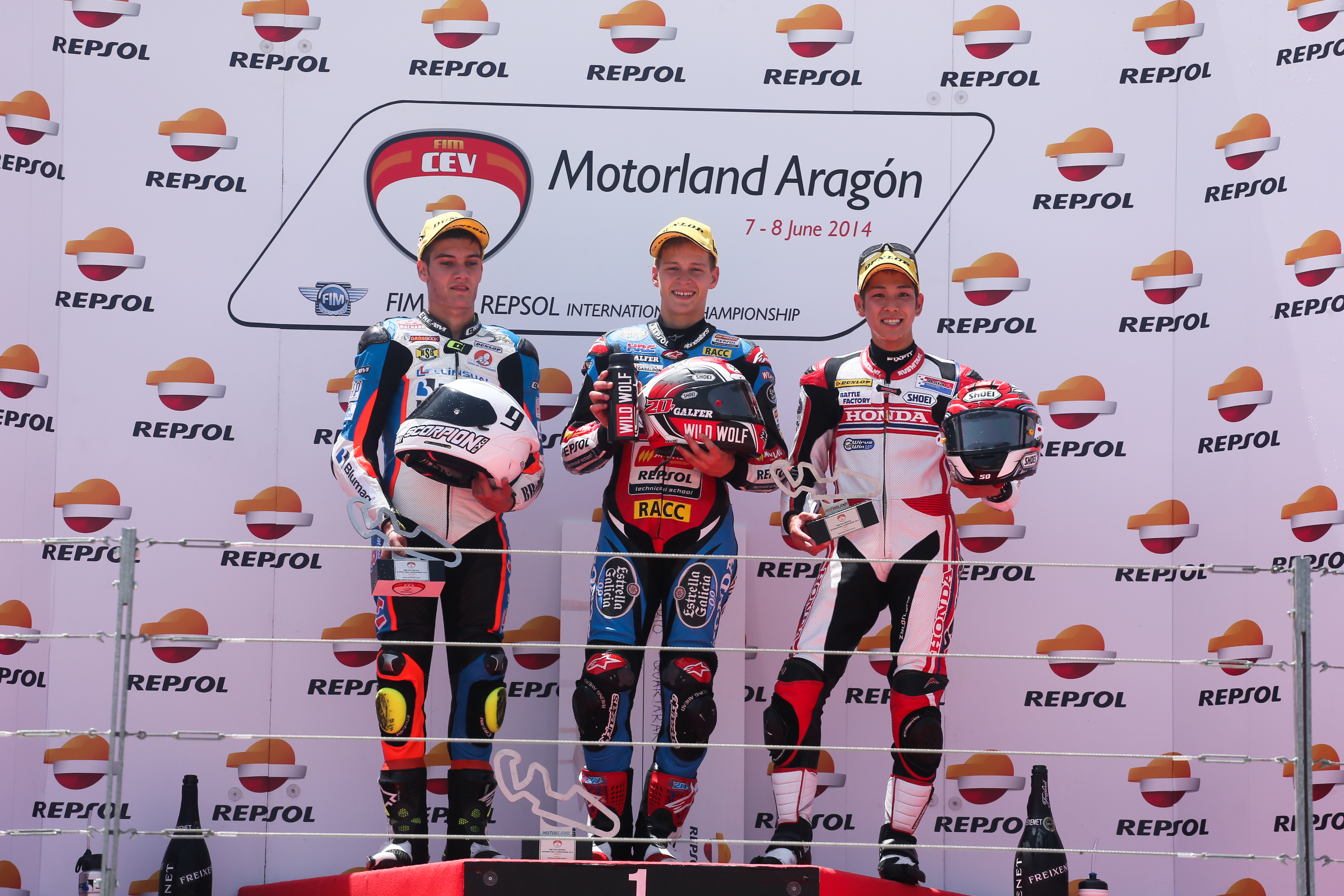
Podium at MotorLand Aragón

The 2014 FIM CEV Moto3 International Championship was the third CEV Moto3 season and the first under the FIM banner. Fabio Quartararo successfully defended his championship by winning nine out of the eleven races. By winning the championship, he secured himself a ride in Moto3 for 2015 – despite being under the minimum age limit – following a rule change in August 2014. Other race winners were María Herrera at Jerez, and series runner up Jorge Navarro at Albacete; Quartararo finished second in both races. Hiroki Ono finished the season in third place with four podiums.

== Calendar ==
2014 calendar
Round	Date	Circuit	Pole position	Fastest lap	Race winner	Winning team	Sources
1	6 April	(Spain) Jerez	(France) Fabio Quartararo	(Spain) María Herrera	(France) Fabio Quartararo	Junior Team Estrella Galicia 0,0	
1	6 April	(Spain) Jerez	(France) Fabio Quartararo	(Italy) Luca Marini	(Spain) María Herrera	Junior Team Estrella Galicia 0,0	
2	17 May	(France) Le Mans	(Argentina) Gabriel Rodrigo	(Italy) Andrea Migno	(France) Fabio Quartararo	Junior Team Estrella Galicia 0,0	
3	8 June	(Spain) Aragon	(France) Fabio Quartararo	(France) Fabio Quartararo	(France) Fabio Quartararo	Junior Team Estrella Galicia 0,0	
4	22 June	(Spain) Catalunya	(France) Fabio Quartararo	(France) Fabio Quartararo	(France) Fabio Quartararo	Junior Team Estrella Galicia 0,0	
4	22 June	(Spain) Catalunya	(France) Fabio Quartararo	(France) Fabio Quartararo	(France) Fabio Quartararo	Junior Team Estrella Galicia 0,0	
5	6 July	(Spain) Albacete	(France) Fabio Quartararo	(Spain) Jorge Navarro	(Spain) Jorge Navarro	Machado-Came Spain	
6	7 September	(Spain) Navarra	(France) Fabio Quartararo	(France) Fabio Quartararo	(France) Fabio Quartararo	Junior Team Estrella Galicia 0,0	
7	2 November	(Portugal) Algarve	(France) Fabio Quartararo	(France) Fabio Quartararo	(France) Fabio Quartararo	Junior Team Estrella Galicia 0,0	
8	16 November	(Spain) Valencia	(Argentina) Gabriel Rodrigo	(France) Fabio Quartararo	(France) Fabio Quartararo	Junior Team Estrella Galicia 0,0	
8	16 November	(Spain) Valencia	(Argentina) Gabriel Rodrigo	(France) Fabio Quartararo	(France) Fabio Quartararo	Junior Team Estrella Galicia 0,0	

== Teams and Riders ==
Team	Constructor	No.	Rider	Rounds
(France) JFC	Alerion GP	67	(France) Julian Loison	2
(Netherlands) Dutch Racing Team	FTR Honda	99	(Netherlands) Bo Bendsneyder	All
(Germany) Eulenstein-Beinlich-RTG	FTR Honda	72	(Germany) Christoph Beinlich	1–4, 6–8
(United Kingdom) KRP	FTR Honda	84	(Belgium) Loris Cresson	2–6
(Spain) Larresport Team Honda Bradol	FTR Honda	34	(United States) Daniel Costilla	8
(Spain) Larresport Team Honda Bradol	FTR Honda	81	(Spain) Aleix Viu	7
(Spain) Larresport Team Honda Bradol	FTR Honda	82	(Spain) Juan Bellver	6–8
(Spain) Larresport Team Honda Bradol	FTR Honda	84	(Belgium) Loris Cresson	1
(Germany) Saxoprint-RTG	FTR Honda	79	(Germany) Maximilian Kappler	All
(Spain) Team Brainer	FTR Honda	82	(Spain) Juan Bellver	1, 3–4
(Italy) Team Ciatti	FTR Honda	77	(Italy) Lorenzo Petrarca	4–5
(Spain) Team Machado FMT	FTR Honda	13	(Netherlands) Jasper Iwema	1–2
(Spain) Team Machado FMT	FTR Honda	29	(Spain) Juanjo Núñez	3–4
(Spain) Team Machado FMT	FTR Honda	32	(Spain) Vicente Pérez	5
(Spain) Team Machado FMT	FTR Honda	85	(Portugal) Pedro Barbosa	6–7
(United Kingdom) / (Netherlands) KRP Abbink Racing	FTR KTM	13	(Netherlands) Jasper Iwema	8
(United Kingdom) KRP/FAB Racing	FTR KTM	28	(United Kingdom) Bradley Ray	1–5, 7–8
(Netherlands) 71WorkX.com Racing	Honda	71	(Netherlands) Thomas van Leeuwen	1, 3, 6, 8
(France) BMS	Honda	41	(Spain) Marc García	8
(Netherlands) DAT Racing	Honda	98	(Netherlands) Tomas De Vries	4
Equipe de France	Honda	60	(France) Enzo De La Vega	2
(Netherlands) Ernst Dubbink Racing Team	Honda	61	(Netherlands) Ernst Dubbink	1
(Spain) H43 Team BLUMAG-TALASUR	Honda	91	(Belgium) Martin Vanhaeren	1–3
(Spain) Junior Team Estrella Galicia 0,0	Honda	6	(Spain) María Herrera	All
(Spain) Junior Team Estrella Galicia 0,0	Honda	9	(Spain) Jorge Navarro	8
(Spain) Junior Team Estrella Galicia 0,0	Honda	20	(France) Fabio Quartararo	All
(Spain) Larresport Honda	Honda	49	(Spain) Borja Quero	1–4
(Spain) Larresport Honda	Honda	66	(Spain) Eduardo Alayon	5–6
(Spain) LKV Competicion	Honda	66	(Spain) Agusti Levy	3
(Spain) Lozano-GPD	Honda	43	(Spain) Jeremy Bernet	8
(France) MG Competicion	Honda	90	(France) Enzo Boulom	2, 8
(Russia) Motorrika	Honda	37	(Indonesia) Mochamad Nurgianto	8
(France) PMS CIP	Honda	38	(Japan) Tatsuki Suzuki	1–7
(Spain) Promoracing	Honda	44	(Spain) Arón Canet	All
(Spain) Promoracing	Honda	64	(Italy) Gabriele Ruiu	2–7
(Germany) Saxoprint-RTG	Honda	48	(France) Alexis Masbou	8
(Germany) Saxoprint-RTG	Honda	68	(United Kingdom) John McPhee	8
(Spain) / (Italy) Team Aspar-VR46 Team	Kalex KTM	16	(Italy) Andrea Migno	1–6
(Spain) / (Italy) Team Aspar-VR46 Team	Kalex KTM	47	(Spain) Aaron Polanco	All
(Spain) / (Italy) Team Aspar-VR46 Team	Kalex KTM	97	(Italy) Luca Marini	All
(France) Gygnet Racing	Kalex KTM	41	(France) Simon Danilo	2–4
(Belgium) Marc VDS Racing Team	Kalex KTM	9	(Spain) Jorge Navarro	6
(France) PMS CIP	Kalex KTM	21	(France) Hugo Casadesus	7–8
Venezuela Racing Team	Kalex KTM	17	(Venezuela) Edgar Gallipoli	All
Venezuela Racing Team	Kalex KTM	23	(Venezuela) Marlon Velandia	1–5
(Netherlands) 71WorkX.com Racing	KTM	71	(Netherlands) Thomas van Leeuwen	2
(Spain) Calvo Team	KTM	2	(Australia) Remy Gardner	All
(Spain) Calvo Team	KTM	11	(Spain) Albert Arenas	8
(Spain) Calvo Team	KTM	24	(Spain) Marcos Ramírez	1–5
(Spain) Calvo Team	KTM	46	(Italy) Nicolò Bulega	All
(Spain) Calvo Team	KTM	69	(United Kingdom) Wayne Ryan	1, 3–8
(Spain) Calvo Team	KTM	73	(Italy) Davide Pizzoli	7–8
(Andorra) Cardelús-BST	KTM	18	(Andorra) Xavier Cardelús	All
(Austria) Cofain Racing Team	KTM	56	(Austria) Thomas Gradinger	1, 3–5
(Italy) DVRacing-BZM	KTM	67	(Spain) Gerard Riu	7–8
(Italy) DVRacing-BZM	KTM	73	(Italy) Davide Pizzoli	1–2, 4–6
(Germany) Freudenberg ADAC Sachsen LZ	KTM	36	(Germany) Max Enderlein	All
(Germany) Freudenberg ADAC Sachsen LZ	KTM	96	(Germany) Jonas Geitner	1–6, 8
(Spain) H43 Team BLUMAG-TALASUR	KTM	74	(Japan) Soushi Mihara	1–2, 4–8
(Russia) Motorrika	KTM	40	(Australia) Lawson Walters	6
(Russia) Motorrika	KTM	55	(Indonesia) Rafid Topan Sucipto	8
(Spain) MS Racing	KTM	23	(Spain) Raúl Fernández	8
(Australia) Olly Simpson Racing	KTM	45	(Australia) Olly Simpson	1–4
Petronas AHM Malaysia	KTM	93	(Malaysia) Ramdan Rosli	All
(Spain) RBA Racing Team	KTM	19	(Argentina) Gabriel Rodrigo	All
(Spain) RBA Racing Team	KTM	29	(Spain) Juanjo Núñez	6, 8
(Spain) RBA Racing Team	KTM	62	(Spain) Adrián Martín	3–5
(Spain) RBA Racing Team	KTM	76	(Kazakhstan) Makar Yurchenko	1–2
(Spain) RBA Racing Team	KTM	84	(Belgium) Loris Cresson	8
(Spain) RBA Racing Team	KTM	87	(Spain) Ferran Cardús	4
(Italy) Sic58 Squadra Corse	KTM	35	(Italy) Anthony Groppi	8
(Italy) Sic58 Squadra Corse	KTM	58	(Italy) Tony Arbolino	8
(Malaysia) / (Finland) SIC-Ajo	KTM	7	(Malaysia) Adam Norrodin	All
(Malaysia) / (Finland) SIC-Ajo	KTM	88	(Malaysia) Hafiza Rofa	All
Top Rider Australia	KTM	40	(Australia) Lawson Walters	1–5
(Spain) Team Machado	Ioda Honda	9	(Spain) Jorge Navarro	1–5
(Spain) Team Machado	Ioda Honda	24	(Spain) Marcos Ramírez	6–8
(Spain) Team Machado	Ioda Honda	59	(New Zealand) Blayes Heaven	4
Equipe de France	Mahindra	80	(France) Loïc Arbel	8
(France) PMS CIP	Mahindra	38	(Japan) Tatsuki Suzuki	8
(India) TMR-Mahindra	Mahindra	11	(Spain) Albert Arenas	1–2, 6
(India) TMR-Mahindra	Mahindra	26	(Spain) Daniel Sáez	7–8
(India) TMR-Mahindra	Mahindra	42	(Italy) Stefano Manzi	1–7
(India) TMR-Mahindra	Mahindra	54	(Italy) Jacopo Cretaro	8
(India) TMR-Mahindra	Mahindra	81	(Spain) Jorge Martín	4–5
(Spain) Cuna de Campeones	MIR Racing KTM	10	(Spain) David Sanchis	All
(Spain) Cuna de Campeones	MIR Racing KTM	15	(Spain) Vicente Pérez	7–8
(Spain) Cuna de Campeones	MIR Racing KTM	39	(Spain) Borja Quero	8
(Spain) H43 Team BlUMAG-TALASUR	Suter Honda	91	(Belgium) Martin Vanhaeren	4–8
(Spain) RBA Racing Team	Suter Honda	8	(Netherlands) Jorel Boerboom	8
(Netherlands) RV Racing	Suter Honda	8	(Netherlands) Jorel Boerboom	1–7
(Spain) Salud en Casa Sport Saez Team	Suter Honda	26	(Spain) Daniel Sáez	1–6
(Italy) TM Racing	TM Racing	52	(Italy) Alessandro Delbianco	8
(Japan) F.C.C. TSR Honda	TSR Honda	33	(Japan) Sena Yamada	6, 8
(Japan) F.C.C. TSR Honda	TSR Honda	51	(Japan) Kenta Fujii	1–4
(Japan) Honda Team Asia	TSR Honda	50	(Japan) Hiroki Ono	All
(Japan) PMU 7C	TSR Honda	27	(Japan) Takuma Kunimine	All

== Championship standings ==
Scoring system

Points are awarded to the top fifteen finishers. A rider has to finish the race to earn points.

Position	**1st**	**2nd**	**3rd**	**4th**	**5th**	**6th**	**7th**	**8th**	**9th**	**10th**	**11th**	**12th**	**13th**	**14th**	**15th**
Points	25	20	16	13	11	10	9	8	7	6	5	4	3	2	1

=== Riders' championships ===
Pos	Rider	Bike	JER (Spain)		LMS (France)	ARA (Spain)	CAT (Spain)		ALB (Spain)	NAV (Spain)	ALG (Portugal)	VAL (Spain)		Pts
1	(France) Fabio Quartararo	Honda	**1**	**2**	1	**1**	**1**	**1**	**2**	**1**	**1**	1	1	265
2	(Spain) Jorge Navarro	Ioda	4	5	4	2	2	3	1					138
2	(Spain) Jorge Navarro	Kalex KTM								2				138
2	(Spain) Jorge Navarro	Honda										32	Ret	138
3	(Japan) Hiroki Ono	TSR Honda	8	4	3	3	3	2	11	4	7	DNS	DNS	116
4	(Argentina) Gabriel Rodrigo	KTM	3	6	**2**	8	5	4	Ret	18	13	**Ret**	**2**	101
5	(Spain) Marcos Ramírez	KTM	5	Ret	6	5	4	7	7					101
5	(Spain) Marcos Ramírez	Ioda Honda								8	3	9	9	101
6	(Italy) Nicolò Bulega	KTM	16	7	13	7	16	10	6	3	2	4	7	95
7	(Italy) Andrea Migno	Kalex KTM	6	3	5	4	6	6	5	5				92
8	(Spain) María Herrera	Honda	2	1	Ret	6	Ret	8	9	7	Ret	5	Ret	90
9	(Australia) Remy Gardner	KTM	12	11	14	17	10	14	3	DNS	4	7	11	62
10	(Spain) Albert Arenas	Mahindra	7	8	8					DNS				54
10	(Spain) Albert Arenas	KTM										3	4	54
11	(United Kingdom) Bradley Ray	FTR/KTM	Ret	13	7	9	11	9	8		5	14	Ret	52
12	(Italy) Stefano Manzi	Mahindra	20	10	12	10	8	12	4	Ret	Ret			41
13	(Japan) Takuma Kunimine	TSR Honda	15	9	28	12	9	Ret	Ret	17	8	10	10	39
14	(Spain) David Sanchis	MIR Racing KTM	28	26	9	20	17	5	Ret	6	24	11	12	37
15	(Netherlands) Bo Bendsneyder	FTR Honda	9	12	Ret	11	12	13	Ret	23	6	33	17	33
16	(Italy) Luca Marini	Kalex KTM	Ret	14	10	15	15	16	10	Ret	18	8	8	32
17	(France) Alexis Masbou	Honda										2	5	31
18	(Belgium) Loris Cresson	FTR Honda	Ret	29	17	13	9	11	12	22				23
18	(Belgium) Loris Cresson	KTM										28	14	23
19	(Netherlands) Jasper Iwema	FTR Honda	14	17	24									22
19	(Netherlands) Jasper Iwema	FTR/KTM										6	6	22
20	(United Kingdom) John McPhee	Honda										Ret	3	16
21	(Malaysia) Ramdan Rosli	KTM	24	28	15	18	14	19	14	9	17	15	13	16
22	(Andorra) Xavier Cardelús	KTM	11	16	11	22	19	18	20	14	Ret	Ret	Ret	12
23	(Spain) Arón Canet	Honda	22	20	21	16	Ret	Ret	16	11	12	13	Ret	12
24	(Spain) Daniel Sáez	Suter Honda	13	Ret	22	24	35	31	27	Ret				10
24	(Spain) Daniel Sáez	Mahindra									9	22	25	10
25	(Spain) Aaron Polanco	Kalex KTM	30	21	DNS	26	29	Ret	24	12	10	17	19	10
26	(United Kingdom) Wayne Ryan	KTM	Ret	DNS		14	22	21	17	10	Ret	19	15	9
27	(Germany) Max Enderlein	KTM	10	Ret	20	Ret	25	24	Ret	24	14	Ret	31	8
28	(Spain) Adrián Martín	KTM				Ret	13	17	13					6
29	(Italy) Davide Pizzoli	KTM	29	34	DNS		24	Ret	26	26	11	Ret	22	5
30	(Germany) Jonas Geitner	KTM	21	25	26	Ret	21	20	19	21		12	Ret	4
31	(Malaysia) Adam Norrodin	KTM	23	32	18	21	38	22	18	13	15	20	23	4
32	(Japan) Tatsuki Suzuki	Honda	17	15	19	Ret	18	26	15	16	20			2
32	(Japan) Tatsuki Suzuki	Mahindra										29	16	2
33	(Germany) Maximilian Kappler	FTR Honda	Ret	DNS	23	19	20	25	31	15	23	23	Ret	1
34	(Spain) Jorge Martín	Mahindra					Ret	15	Ret					1
	(Italy) Tony Arbolino	KTM										16	Ret	0
	(Spain) Gerard Riu	KTM									16	DNS	DNS	0
	(France) Simon Danilo	Kalex KTM			16	27	DNS	DNS						0
	(Australia) Olly Simpson	KTM	18	18	29	25	WD	WD						0
	(Japan) Sena Yamada	TSR Honda								34		Ret	18	0
	(Spain) Juan Bellver	FTR Honda	31	33		Ret	Ret	Ret		Ret	Ret	18	24	0
	(Japan) Soushi Mihara	KTM	19	19	25		33	30	22	25	19	DNQ	DNQ	0
	(Malaysia) Hafiza Rofa	KTM	25	22	30	23	26	Ret	25	19	25	26	Ret	0
	(Italy) Anthony Groppi	KTM										21	20	0
	(Belgium) Martin Vanhaeren	Honda	36	35	32	35								0
	(Belgium) Martin Vanhaeren	Suter Honda					28	29	DNQ	20	Ret	30	Ret	0
	(Spain) Vicente Pérez	FTR Honda							Ret					0
	(Spain) Vicente Pérez	MIR Racing KTM									Ret	Ret	21	0
	(Portugal) Pedro Barbosa	FTR Honda								32	21			0
	(Spain) Eduardo Alayon	Honda							21	Ret				0
	(Germany) Christoph Beinlich	FTR Honda	32	27	31	33	Ret	Ret		28	22	31	30	0
	(Japan) Kenta Fujii	TSR Honda	27	23	27	30	23	23						0
	(Italy) Lorenzo Petrarca	FTR Honda					34	32	23					0
	(Netherlands) Thomas van Leeuwen	Honda	38	36		31				29		24	28	0
	(Netherlands) Thomas van Leeuwen	KTM			Ret									0
	(Austria) Thomas Gradinger	KTM	26	24		28	31	Ret	28					0
	(Venezuela) Edgar Gallipoli	Kalex KTM	35	30	Ret	Ret	32	27	Ret	27	26	25	29	0
	(France) Enzo Boulom	Honda			DNS							Ret	26	0
	(Spain) Juanjo Núñez	FTR Honda				36	DNQ	DNQ		30		27	27	0
	(Spain) Ferran Cardús	KTM					27	Ret						0
	(Italy) Gabriele Ruiu	Honda			34	37	30	28	Ret	31	Ret			0
	(Venezuela) Marlon Velandia	Kalex KTM	34	Ret	33	32	DNS	DNS	29					0
	(Australia) Lawson Walters	KTM	37	37	Ret	29	36	Ret	30	35				0
	(Kazakhstan) Makar Yurchenko	KTM	33	31	DNS									0
	(France) Hugo Casadesus	Kalex KTM									Ret	Ret	32	0
	(Netherlands) Jorel Boerboom	Suter Honda	DNQ	DNQ	DNQ	DNS	37	33	DNQ	33	Ret	DNQ	DNQ	0
	(Spain) Borja Quero	Honda	Ret	Ret	Ret	34	WD	WD						0
	(Spain) Borja Quero	MIR Racing KTM										DNQ	DNQ	0
	(France) Enzo De La Vega	Honda			35									0
	(Spain) Raúl Fernández	KTM										Ret	Ret	0
	(Spain) Aleix Viu	FTR Honda									Ret			0
	(Netherlands) Ernst Dubbink	Honda	DNQ	DNQ										0
	(France) Julian Loison	Alerion GP			DNQ									
	(Spain) Agusti Levy	Honda				DNQ								
	(New Zealand) Blayes Heaven	Ioda Honda					DNQ	DNQ						
	(Netherlands) Tomas De Vries	Honda					DNQ	DNQ						
	(Italy) Alessandro Delbianco	TM Racing										DNQ	DNQ	
	(United States) Daniel Costilla	FTR Honda										DNQ	DNQ	
	(Italy) Jacopo Cretaro	Mahindra										DNQ	DNQ	
	(Spain) Jeremy Bernet	Honda										DNQ	DNQ	
	(France) Loïc Arbel	Mahindra										DNQ	DNQ	
	(Spain) Marc García	Honda										DNQ	DNQ	
	(Indonesia) Mochamad Nurgianto	Honda										DNQ	DNQ	
	(Indonesia) Rafid Topan Sucipto	KTM										DNQ	DNQ	
Pos	Rider	Bike	JER (Spain)		LMS (France)	ARA (Spain)	CAT (Spain)		ALB (Spain)	NAV (Spain)	ALG (Portugal)	VAL (Spain)		Pts

Colour	Result
Gold	Winner
Silver	Second place
Bronze	Third place
Green	Points classification
Blue	Non-points classification
Blue	Non-classified finish (NC)
Purple	Retired, not classified (Ret)
Red	Did not qualify (DNQ)
Red	Did not pre-qualify (DNPQ)
Black	Disqualified (DSQ)
White	Did not start (DNS)
White	Withdrew (WD)
White	Race cancelled (C)
Blank	Did not practice (DNP)
Blank	Did not arrive (DNA)
Blank	Excluded (EX)

**Bold** – Pole position
Italics – Fastest lap

=== Constructors' championship ===
Pos	Constructor	JER (Spain)		LMS (France)	ARA (Spain)	CAT (Spain)		ALB (Spain)	NAV (Spain)	ALG (Portugal)	VAL (Spain)		Points
1	(Japan) Honda	1	1	1	1	1	1	1	1	1	1	1	275
2	(Austria) KTM	3	5	2	4	3	3	2	3	2	3	2	184
3	(Japan) TSR Honda	7	4	3	2	2	2	10	4	6	9	9	141
4	(Germany) Kalex												136
5	(India) Mahindra												76
6	(United Kingdom) FTR Honda												62
7	(Switzerland) Suter												4
