= 2014 Moto3 World Championship =

3rd running of the Moto3 World Championship

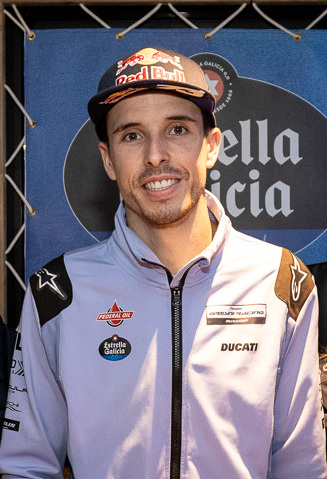
Álex Márquez (pictured in 2023) was the 2014 Moto3 World Riders' Champion.

The 2014 FIM Moto3 World Championship was the lightweight class of the 66th Fédération Internationale de Motocyclisme (FIM) Road Racing World Championship season. Maverick Viñales was the reigning series champion, but did not contest the season as he moved to the series' intermediate class, Moto2.

The riders' championship was not settled until the final round of the season, and was won by Estrella Galicia 0,0 rider Álex Márquez, the brother of 2010 125cc champion Marc Márquez; as a result, the Márquez brothers became the first siblings to each win a Grand Prix motorcycle racing title. Márquez – a three-time race winner – prevailed after a third-place finish in Valencia, which was good enough to give him the title by two points over Jack Miller, who won the race. Miller, who had not finished on a Grand Prix podium prior to the 2014 season, achieved six victories and ten podium finishes, riding for the Ajo Motorsport team. Third place in the championship was also decided in Valencia, with Álex Rins, teammate to Márquez at the Estrella Galicia 0,0 team, able to take the position ahead of SaxoPrint–RTG's Efrén Vázquez. Both riders took two victories during the season, including the first two of Vázquez's Grand Prix career.

The only other riders to take victories during the season were the riders that finished fifth and sixth in the final riders' championship standings. Riding for Valentino Rossi's Sky Racing Team by VR46, Romano Fenati took four victories during the season, but with only two further podium finishes, he was unable to mount a substantial championship challenge. Alexis Masbou, riding for Ongetta–Rivacold, was also a first-time Grand Prix winner during the 2014 season; he won at Brno, after prevailing in a 17-rider lead battle. The rookie of the year standings were comfortably won by Enea Bastianini of the Junior Team GO&FUN Moto3. Bastianini finished ninth overall having graduated from the Red Bull MotoGP Rookies Cup, taking three podium finishes during the campaign. In the constructors' championship, KTM and Honda finished tied on 384 points, but KTM won the title – a third consecutive title – on countback as the marque had won 10 races to Honda's 8.

== Calendar ==
The Fédération Internationale de Motocyclisme released a 19-race provisional calendar on 2 October 2013. The calendar was updated on 13 December 2013 and again on 24 February 2014, resulting in an 18-race calendar.

The 2014 calendar originally saw the addition of two South American races, the series' first visit to the continent since 2004. A race in Argentina at the newly upgraded Autódromo Termas de Río Hondo is scheduled for 27 April and a race in Brazil at the Autódromo Internacional Nelson Piquet in Brasilia was scheduled for 28 September, but the latter was subsequently removed from the calendar. The round at MotorLand Aragón was also moved back a week, filling the date originally scheduled for Brazil.

Round	Date	Grand Prix	Circuit
1	23 March ‡	Commercial Bank Grand Prix of Qatar	Lusail International Circuit, Lusail
2	13 April	(United States) Red Bull Grand Prix of the Americas	Circuit of the Americas, Austin
3	27 April	Gran Premio Red Bull de la República Argentina	Autódromo Termas de Río Hondo, Termas de Río Hondo
4	4 May	(Spain) Gran Premio bwin de España	Circuito de Jerez, Jerez de la Frontera
5	18 May	Monster Energy Grand Prix de France	Bugatti Circuit, Le Mans
6	1 June	(Italy) Gran Premio d'Italia TIM	Mugello Circuit, Scarperia e San Piero
7	15 June	(Catalonia) Gran Premi Monster Energy de Catalunya	Circuit de Barcelona-Catalunya, Montmeló
8	28 June ††	(Netherlands) Iveco Daily TT Assen	TT Circuit Assen, Assen
9	13 July	(Germany) eni Motorrad Grand Prix Deutschland	Sachsenring, Hohenstein-Ernstthal
10	10 August	Red Bull Indianapolis Grand Prix	Indianapolis Motor Speedway, Speedway
11	17 August	(Czech Republic) bwin Grand Prix České republiky	Brno Circuit, Brno
12	31 August	(United Kingdom) Hertz British Grand Prix	Silverstone Circuit, Silverstone
13	14 September	Gran Premio TIM di San Marino e della Riviera di Rimini	Misano World Circuit, Misano Adriatico
14	28 September	(Aragon) Gran Premio Movistar de Aragón	MotorLand Aragón, Alcañiz
15	12 October	Motul Grand Prix of Japan	Motegi Circuit, Motegi
16	19 October	(Australia) Tissot Australian Grand Prix	Phillip Island Grand Prix Circuit, Phillip Island
17	26 October	(Malaysia) Shell Advance Malaysian Motorcycle Grand Prix	Sepang International Circuit, Sepang
18	9 November	(Valencian Community) Gran Premio Generali de la Comunitat Valenciana	Circuit Ricardo Tormo, Valencia

‡ = Night race
†† = Saturday race

== Teams and riders ==
A provisional entry list was released by the Fédération Internationale de Motocyclisme on 20 November 2013. An updated entry list was released on 14 January 2014. The final entry list was released on 28 February 2014. All teams used Dunlop tyres.

Team	Constructor	Motorcycle	No.	Rider	Rounds
(Germany) Kiefer Racing	Kalex KTM	Kalex KTM Moto3	2	(Australia) Remy Gardner	13
(Germany) Kiefer Racing	Kalex KTM	Kalex KTM Moto3	4	(Venezuela) Gabriel Ramos	All
(Germany) Kiefer Racing	Kalex KTM	Kalex KTM Moto3	43	(Germany) Luca Grünwald	1–12, 14–18
(Spain) Calvo Team (Spain) Calvo Team Laglisse (Spain) Team Laglisse Calvo	KTM	KTM RC250GP	2	(Australia) Remy Gardner	17
(Spain) Calvo Team (Spain) Calvo Team Laglisse (Spain) Team Laglisse Calvo	KTM	KTM RC250R	2	(Australia) Remy Gardner	16
(Spain) Calvo Team (Spain) Calvo Team Laglisse (Spain) Team Laglisse Calvo	KTM	KTM RC250GP	14	(Spain) Albert Arenas	18
(Spain) Calvo Team (Spain) Calvo Team Laglisse (Spain) Team Laglisse Calvo	KTM	KTM RC250R	24	(Spain) Marcos Ramírez	4
(Spain) Calvo Team (Spain) Calvo Team Laglisse (Spain) Team Laglisse Calvo	KTM	KTM RC250GP	32	(Spain) Isaac Viñales	All
(Spain) Calvo Team (Spain) Calvo Team Laglisse (Spain) Team Laglisse Calvo	KTM	KTM RC250GP	57	(Brazil) Eric Granado	1–16
(Spain) Calvo Team (Spain) Calvo Team Laglisse (Spain) Team Laglisse Calvo	KTM	KTM RC250GP	84	(Czech Republic) Jakub Kornfeil	All
(Italy) San Carlo Team Italia	Mahindra	Mahindra MGP3O	3	(Italy) Matteo Ferrari	All
(Italy) San Carlo Team Italia	Mahindra	Mahindra MGP3O	34	(Italy) Michael Ruben Rinaldi	5
(Italy) San Carlo Team Italia	Mahindra	Mahindra MGP3O	55	(Italy) Andrea Locatelli	1–3, 6–18
(Italy) Sky Racing Team by VR46	KTM	KTM RC250GP	5	(Italy) Romano Fenati	All
(Italy) Sky Racing Team by VR46	KTM	KTM RC250GP	21	(Italy) Francesco Bagnaia	All
(Spain) Estrella Galicia 0,0 (Spain) Junior Team Estrella Galicia 0,0	Honda	Honda NSF250RW	6	(Spain) María Herrera	4, 7, 18
(Spain) Estrella Galicia 0,0 (Spain) Junior Team Estrella Galicia 0,0	Honda	Honda NSF250RW	12	(Spain) Álex Márquez	All
(Spain) Estrella Galicia 0,0 (Spain) Junior Team Estrella Galicia 0,0	Honda	Honda NSF250RW	42	(Spain) Álex Rins	All
(Germany) SaxoPrint–RTG	Honda	Honda NSF250RW	7	(Spain) Efrén Vázquez	All
(Germany) SaxoPrint–RTG	Honda	Honda NSF250RW	17	(United Kingdom) John McPhee	All
(Germany) SaxoPrint–RTG	FTR	FTR M314	97	(Germany) Maximilian Kappler	9
(Finland) Red Bull KTM Ajo (Finland) Avant Tecno Husqvarna Ajo (Finland) Red Bull Husqvarna Ajo (Finland) SIC–Ajo	KTM	KTM RC250GP	8	(Australia) Jack Miller	All
(Finland) Red Bull KTM Ajo (Finland) Avant Tecno Husqvarna Ajo (Finland) Red Bull Husqvarna Ajo (Finland) SIC–Ajo	Husqvarna	Husqvarna FR250GP	31	(Finland) Niklas Ajo	1–8, 10–18
(Finland) Red Bull KTM Ajo (Finland) Avant Tecno Husqvarna Ajo (Finland) Red Bull Husqvarna Ajo (Finland) SIC–Ajo	KTM	KTM RC250GP	38	(Malaysia) Hafiq Azmi	All
(Finland) Red Bull KTM Ajo (Finland) Avant Tecno Husqvarna Ajo (Finland) Red Bull Husqvarna Ajo (Finland) SIC–Ajo	Husqvarna	Husqvarna FR250GP	52	(United Kingdom) Danny Kent	All
(Finland) Red Bull KTM Ajo (Finland) Avant Tecno Husqvarna Ajo (Finland) Red Bull Husqvarna Ajo (Finland) SIC–Ajo	KTM	KTM RC250R	88	(Malaysia) Hafiza Rofa	17
(Finland) Red Bull KTM Ajo (Finland) Avant Tecno Husqvarna Ajo (Finland) Red Bull Husqvarna Ajo (Finland) SIC–Ajo	Husqvarna	Husqvarna FR250GP	91	(Argentina) Gabriel Rodrigo	9
(Finland) Red Bull KTM Ajo (Finland) Avant Tecno Husqvarna Ajo (Finland) Red Bull Husqvarna Ajo (Finland) SIC–Ajo	KTM	KTM RC250GP	98	(Czech Republic) Karel Hanika	All
(Netherlands) RW Racing GP	Kalex KTM	Kalex KTM Moto3	9	(Netherlands) Scott Deroue	All
(Netherlands) RW Racing GP	Kalex KTM	Kalex KTM Moto3	22	(Spain) Ana Carrasco	1–14
(Italy) Ongetta–Rivacold (Italy) Ongetta–AirAsia	Honda	Honda NSF250RW	10	(France) Alexis Masbou	All
(Italy) Ongetta–Rivacold (Italy) Ongetta–AirAsia	Honda	Honda NSF250RW	63	(Malaysia) Zulfahmi Khairuddin	All
(Belgium) Marc VDS Racing Team	KTM	KTM RC250R	11	(Belgium) Livio Loi	9
(Belgium) Marc VDS Racing Team	Kalex KTM	KTM RC250R	11	(Belgium) Livio Loi	8
(Belgium) Marc VDS Racing Team	Kalex KTM	Kalex KTM Moto3	11	(Belgium) Livio Loi	1–7
(Belgium) Marc VDS Racing Team	Kalex KTM	Kalex KTM Moto3	99	(Spain) Jorge Navarro	10–18
(United Kingdom) KRP Abbink Racing	FTR KTM	FTR M314	13	(Netherlands) Jasper Iwema	8, 12
(France) CIP	Mahindra	Mahindra MGP3O	13	(Netherlands) Jasper Iwema	14–18
(France) CIP	Mahindra	Mahindra MGP3O	19	(Italy) Alessandro Tonucci	All
(France) CIP	Mahindra	Mahindra MGP3O	51	(Netherlands) Bryan Schouten	1–13
(Italy) MT Racing Honda	FTR Honda	FTR M314	16	(Italy) Simone Mazzola	6
(India) Mahindra Racing	Mahindra	Mahindra MGP3O	16	(Italy) Andrea Migno	12–18
(India) Mahindra Racing	Mahindra	Mahindra MGP3O	44	(Portugal) Miguel Oliveira	All
(India) Mahindra Racing	Mahindra	Mahindra MGP3O	61	(Australia) Arthur Sissis	1–11
(Italy) Junior Team GO&FUN Moto3	KTM	KTM RC250GP	23	(Italy) Niccolò Antonelli	All
(Italy) Junior Team GO&FUN Moto3	KTM	KTM RC250GP	33	(Italy) Enea Bastianini	All
(Italy) Ambrogio Racing	Mahindra	Mahindra MGP3O	41	(South Africa) Brad Binder	All
(Italy) Ambrogio Racing	Mahindra	Mahindra MGP3O	95	(France) Jules Danilo	All
(Australia) Olly Simpson Racing	KTM	KTM RC250R	45	(Australia) Olly Simpson	16
(Japan) Honda Team Asia	Honda	Honda NSF250R	50	(Japan) Hiroki Ono	14
(Spain) Mapfre Aspar Team Moto3	Kalex KTM	Kalex KTM Moto3	58	(Spain) Juan Francisco Guevara	All
(Switzerland) Interwetten Paddock Moto3	Kalex KTM	Kalex KTM Moto3	65	(Germany) Philipp Öttl	All
(United Kingdom) Redline Motorcycles/KTM UK	KTM	KTM RC250R	66	(United Kingdom) Joe Irving	12
(Italy) Pos Corse	FTR Honda	FTR M314	69	(Italy) Anthony Groppi	6
(Netherlands) 71Workx.com Racing Team	Kalex KTM	Kalex KTM Moto3	71	(Netherlands) Thomas van Leeuwen	8
(France) Team RMS	Honda	Honda NSF250R	73	(France) Renald Castillon	5
(Italy) Team Ciatti	KTM	KTM RC250R	77	(Italy) Lorenzo Petrarca	13
(Japan) Liberto Plusone & Endurance	Honda	Honda NSF250R	81	(Japan) Sena Yamada	15
(Japan) Hot Racing with I-Factory	Honda	Honda NSF250R	83	(Japan) Hikari Okubo	15
(Germany) Fai Rent-A-Jet	Honda	Honda NSF250R	86	(Germany) Kevin Hanus	9
(Spain) RBA Racing Team	KTM	KTM RC250R	91	(Argentina) Gabriel Rodrigo	4, 7
(Spain) RBA Racing Team	KTM	KTM RC250GP	91	(Argentina) Gabriel Rodrigo	11, 13–14, 18
Petronas AHM Malaysia	KTM	KTM RC250R	93	(Malaysia) Ramdan Rosli	17

Key
Regular rider
Wildcard rider
Replacement rider

== Results and standings ==
=== Grands Prix ===
Round	Grand Prix	Pole position	Fastest lap	Winning rider	Winning team	Winning constructor	Report
1	Qatar motorcycle Grand Prix	(Spain) Álex Rins	(France) Alexis Masbou	(Australia) Jack Miller	(Finland) Red Bull KTM Ajo	(Austria) KTM	Report
2	(United States) Motorcycle Grand Prix of the Americas	(Australia) Jack Miller	(Spain) Álex Márquez	(Australia) Jack Miller	(Finland) Red Bull KTM Ajo	(Austria) KTM	Report
3	(Argentina) Argentine Republic motorcycle Grand Prix	(Australia) Jack Miller	(Spain) Álex Márquez	(Italy) Romano Fenati	(Italy) Sky Racing Team by VR46	(Austria) KTM	Report
4	(Spain) Spanish motorcycle Grand Prix	(Australia) Jack Miller	(Spain) Álex Rins	(Italy) Romano Fenati	(Italy) Sky Racing Team by VR46	(Austria) KTM	Report
5	(France) French motorcycle Grand Prix	(Spain) Efrén Vázquez	(Italy) Francesco Bagnaia	(Australia) Jack Miller	(Finland) Red Bull KTM Ajo	(Austria) KTM	Report
6	(Italy) Italian motorcycle Grand Prix	(Spain) Álex Rins	(Spain) Efrén Vázquez	(Italy) Romano Fenati	(Italy) Sky Racing Team by VR46	(Austria) KTM	Report
7	(Catalonia) Catalan motorcycle Grand Prix	(Spain) Álex Márquez	(United Kingdom) John McPhee	(Spain) Álex Márquez	(Spain) Estrella Galicia 0,0	(Japan) Honda	Report
8	(Netherlands) Dutch TT	(Australia) Jack Miller	(Italy) Romano Fenati	(Spain) Álex Márquez	(Spain) Estrella Galicia 0,0	(Japan) Honda	Report
9	(Germany) German motorcycle Grand Prix	(Australia) Jack Miller	(South Africa) Brad Binder	(Australia) Jack Miller	(Finland) Red Bull KTM Ajo	(Austria) KTM	Report
10	Indianapolis motorcycle Grand Prix	(Australia) Jack Miller	(Spain) Álex Rins	(Spain) Efrén Vázquez	(Germany) SaxoPrint–RTG	(Japan) Honda	Report
11	Czech Republic motorcycle Grand Prix	(Spain) Álex Márquez	(Italy) Romano Fenati	(France) Alexis Masbou	(Italy) Ongetta–Rivacold	(Japan) Honda	Report
12	(United Kingdom) British motorcycle Grand Prix	(Spain) Álex Rins	(Czech Republic) Jakub Kornfeil	(Spain) Álex Rins	(Spain) Estrella Galicia 0,0	(Japan) Honda	Report
13	San Marino and Rimini Riviera motorcycle Grand Prix	(Australia) Jack Miller	(Spain) Juan Francisco Guevara	(Spain) Álex Rins	(Spain) Estrella Galicia 0,0	(Japan) Honda	Report
14	Aragon motorcycle Grand Prix	(Spain) Álex Rins	(Italy) Romano Fenati	(Italy) Romano Fenati	(Italy) Sky Racing Team by VR46	(Austria) KTM	Report
15	(Japan) Japanese motorcycle Grand Prix	(United Kingdom) Danny Kent	(Spain) Álex Márquez	(Spain) Álex Márquez	(Spain) Estrella Galicia 0,0	(Japan) Honda	Report
16	(Australia) Australian motorcycle Grand Prix	(Spain) Álex Márquez	(Australia) Jack Miller	(Australia) Jack Miller	(Finland) Red Bull KTM Ajo	(Austria) KTM	Report
17	(Malaysia) Malaysian motorcycle Grand Prix	(Australia) Jack Miller	(Spain) Álex Rins	(Spain) Efrén Vázquez	(Germany) SaxoPrint–RTG	(Japan) Honda	Report
18	Valencian Community motorcycle Grand Prix	(Italy) Niccolò Antonelli	(Spain) Efrén Vázquez	(Australia) Jack Miller	(Finland) Red Bull KTM Ajo	(Austria) KTM	Report

=== Riders' standings ===
Scoring system

Points were awarded to the top fifteen finishers. A rider had to finish the race to earn points.

Position	**1st**	**2nd**	**3rd**	**4th**	**5th**	**6th**	**7th**	**8th**	**9th**	**10th**	**11th**	**12th**	**13th**	**14th**	**15th**
Points	25	20	16	13	11	10	9	8	7	6	5	4	3	2	1

Pos	Rider	Bike	QAT (Qatar)	AME (United States)	ARG (Argentina)	SPA (Spain)	FRA (France)	ITA (Italy)	CAT (Catalonia)	NED (Netherlands)	GER (Germany)	INP (Indianapolis)	CZE (Czech Republic)	GBR (United Kingdom)	RSM (San Marino)	ARA (Aragon)	JPN (Japan)	AUS (Australia)	MAL (Malaysia)	VAL (Valencian Community)	Pts
1	(Spain) Álex Márquez	Honda	2	Ret	2	7	5	Ret	**1**	1	4	6	**4**	2	2	2	1	**2**	5	3	278
2	(Australia) Jack Miller	KTM	1	**1**	**3**	**4**	1	Ret	4	**Ret**	**1**	**3**	5	6	**3**	27	5	1	**2**	1	276
3	(Spain) Álex Rins	Honda	**5**	4	5	3	2	**3**	Ret	2	Ret	5	9	**1**	1	**4**	10	3	3	5	237
4	(Spain) Efrén Vázquez	Honda	3	3	6	2	**6**	12	3	6	6	1	8	Ret	10	13	2	4	1	6	222
5	(Italy) Romano Fenati	KTM	12	2	1	1	Ret	1	5	18	Ret	2	11	16	11	1	7	Ret	Ret	14	176
6	(France) Alexis Masbou	Honda	7	6	11	12	9	6	11	4	3	4	1	8	7	10	Ret	6	6	12	164
7	(Spain) Isaac Viñales	KTM	8	Ret	7	5	3	2	7	7	8	17	10	13	4	12	11	Ret	Ret	2	141
8	(United Kingdom) Danny Kent	Husqvarna	13	8	9	11	13	15	17	8	5	12	3	9	12	3	**6**	20	4	4	129
9	(Italy) Enea Bastianini	KTM	16	13	10	9	7	Ret	2	Ret	15	11	2	3	5	6	8	Ret	10	11	127
10	(Portugal) Miguel Oliveira	Mahindra	4	15	DNS	14	12	4	12	3	Ret	7	7	4	22	7	Ret	7	Ret	8	110
11	(South Africa) Brad Binder	Mahindra	15	Ret	14	Ret	14	9	6	9	2	9	6	15	6	8	3	15	Ret	9	109
12	(Czech Republic) Jakub Kornfeil	KTM	6	5	20	6	10	Ret	15	11	11	10	14	5	17	5	Ret	8	8	13	97
13	(United Kingdom) John McPhee	Honda	11	9	Ret	13	8	Ret	9	10	7	Ret	Ret	11	13	Ret	4	5	Ret	17	77
14	(Italy) Niccolò Antonelli	KTM	9	Ret	25	Ret	Ret	Ret	Ret	5	Ret	18	13	7	16	9	9	10	7	**7**	68
15	(Finland) Niklas Ajo	Husqvarna	26	14	8	10	Ret	5	8	Ret		Ret	12	10	Ret	25	Ret	9	Ret	Ret	52
16	(Italy) Francesco Bagnaia	KTM	10	7	Ret	8	4	Ret	10	DNS	DNS	Ret	17	21	Ret	24	13	11	Ret	16	50
17	(Spain) Juan Francisco Guevara	Kalex KTM	Ret	11	12	16	Ret	8	28	Ret	10	8	16	14	9	Ret	Ret	25	11	15	46
18	(Czech Republic) Karel Hanika	KTM	14	10	Ret	19	Ret	10	14	Ret	Ret	13	15	12	Ret	23	12	13	9	10	44
19	(Italy) Alessandro Tonucci	Mahindra	21	16	13	18	Ret	7	13	26	16	Ret	21	22	18	Ret	15	14	14	21	20
20	(Malaysia) Zulfahmi Khairuddin	Honda	18	17	15	20	11	11	16	14	Ret	15	22	18	14	15	14	Ret	Ret	19	19
21	(Belgium) Livio Loi	Kalex KTM	17	12	4	Ret	20	19	25	25											17
21	(Belgium) Livio Loi	KTM									Ret										17
22	(Italy) Matteo Ferrari	Mahindra	Ret	Ret	Ret	25	21	14	21	13	9	Ret	20	24	Ret	Ret	24	24	Ret	25	12
23	(Spain) Jorge Navarro	Kalex KTM										14	Ret	27	15	Ret	Ret	12	12	Ret	11
24	(Germany) Philipp Öttl	Kalex KTM	20	20	21	15	15	13	19	15	12	20	24	17	19	Ret	17	21	18	Ret	10
25	(Italy) Andrea Migno	Mahindra												Ret	8	Ret	Ret	17	Ret	18	8
26	(Japan) Hiroki Ono	Honda														11					5
27	(Netherlands) Jasper Iwema	FTR KTM								12				23							4
27	(Netherlands) Jasper Iwema	Mahindra														16	20	16	Ret	20	4
28	(Malaysia) Hafiq Azmi	KTM	Ret	24	16	24	16	Ret	Ret	29	18	24	28	20	23	19	18	18	13	23	3
29	(Australia) Arthur Sissis	Mahindra	DNS	Ret	22	Ret	17	17	18	21	13	21	26								3
30	(France) Jules Danilo	Mahindra	Ret	22	24	27	Ret	22	27	22	17	16	18	25	26	14	19	22	17	Ret	2
31	(Brazil) Eric Granado	KTM	Ret	18	19	Ret	DNS	23	23	19	14	22	27	26	21	17	16	DNS			2
32	(Australia) Remy Gardner	Kalex KTM													27						1
32	(Australia) Remy Gardner	KTM																26	15		1
	(Germany) Luca Grünwald	Kalex KTM	22	23	Ret	26	18	16	20	28	19	19	Ret	DNS		26	21	19	16	22	0
	(Netherlands) Bryan Schouten	Mahindra	25	26	18	22	19	21	24	16	Ret	27	23	DNS	20						0
	(Italy) Andrea Locatelli	Mahindra	23	25	Ret			18	29	17	Ret	25	25	19	Ret	18	23	Ret	Ret	26	0
	(Spain) María Herrera	Honda				17			Ret											27	0
	(Netherlands) Scott Deroue	Kalex KTM	19	19	17	Ret	25	Ret	26	20	Ret	23	19	Ret	Ret	Ret	Ret	23	Ret	Ret	0
	(Venezuela) Gabriel Ramos	Kalex KTM	Ret	Ret	26	28	24	26	31	27	Ret	Ret	29	28	28	21	22	27	19	24	0
	(Spain) Ana Carrasco	Kalex KTM	24	21	23	23	22	20	30	24	20	26	Ret	29	24	22					0
	(Malaysia) Hafiza Rofa	KTM																	20		0
	(Argentina) Gabriel Rodrigo	KTM				Ret			22				Ret		Ret	20				Ret	0
	(Argentina) Gabriel Rodrigo	Husqvarna									22										0
	(Germany) Maximilian Kappler	FTR									21										0
	(Spain) Marcos Ramírez	KTM				21															0
	(Germany) Kevin Hanus	Honda									23										0
	(Netherlands) Thomas van Leeuwen	Kalex KTM								23											0
	(Italy) Michael Ruben Rinaldi	Mahindra					23														0
	(Italy) Simone Mazzola	FTR Honda						24													0
	(Italy) Lorenzo Petrarca	KTM													25						0
	(Italy) Anthony Groppi	FTR Honda						25													0
	(Spain) Albert Arenas	KTM																		28	0
	(Australia) Olly Simpson	KTM																28			0
	(Malaysia) Ramdan Rosli	KTM																	Ret		0
	(Japan) Hikari Okubo	Honda															Ret				0
	(Japan) Sena Yamada	Honda															Ret				0
	(United Kingdom) Joe Irving	KTM												Ret							0
	(France) Rénald Castillon	Honda					DNQ														0
Pos	Rider	Bike	QAT (Qatar)	AME (United States)	ARG (Argentina)	SPA (Spain)	FRA (France)	ITA (Italy)	CAT (Catalonia)	NED (Netherlands)	GER (Germany)	INP (Indianapolis)	CZE (Czech Republic)	GBR (United Kingdom)	RSM (San Marino)	ARA (Aragon)	JPN (Japan)	AUS (Australia)	MAL (Malaysia)	VAL (Valencian Community)	Pts

Colour	Result
Gold	Winner
Silver	Second place
Bronze	Third place
Green	Points classification
Blue	Non-points classification
Blue	Non-classified finish (NC)
Purple	Retired, not classified (Ret)
Red	Did not qualify (DNQ)
Red	Did not pre-qualify (DNPQ)
Black	Disqualified (DSQ)
White	Did not start (DNS)
White	Withdrew (WD)
White	Race cancelled (C)
Blank	Did not practice (DNP)
Blank	Did not arrive (DNA)
Blank	Excluded (EX)

**Bold** – Pole
Italics – Fastest Lap
Light blue – Rookie

=== Constructors' standings ===
Each constructor received the same number of points as their best placed rider in each race.

Pos	Constructor	QAT (Qatar)	AME (United States)	ARG (Argentina)	SPA (Spain)	FRA (France)	ITA (Italy)	CAT (Catalonia)	NED (Netherlands)	GER (Germany)	INP (Indianapolis)	CZE (Czech Republic)	GBR (United Kingdom)	RSM (San Marino)	ARA (Aragon)	JPN (Japan)	AUS (Australia)	MAL (Malaysia)	VAL (Valencian Community)	Pts
1	(Austria) KTM	1	1	1	1	1	1	2	5	1	2	2	3	3	1	5	1	2	1	384
2	(Japan) Honda	2	3	2	2	2	3	1	1	3	1	1	1	1	2	1	2	1	3	384
3	(India) Mahindra	4	15	13	14	12	4	6	3	2	7	6	4	6	7	3	7	14	8	168
4	(Sweden) Husqvarna	13	8	8	10	13	5	8	8	5	12	3	9	12	3	6	9	4	4	156
5	(Germany) Kalex KTM	17	11	4	15	15	8	19	15	10	8	16	14	9	21	17	12	11	15	62
6	(United Kingdom) FTR KTM								12				23							4
	(United Kingdom) FTR									21										0
	(United Kingdom) FTR Honda						24													0
Pos	Constructor	QAT (Qatar)	AME (United States)	ARG (Argentina)	SPA (Spain)	FRA (France)	ITA (Italy)	CAT (Catalonia)	NED (Netherlands)	GER (Germany)	INP (Indianapolis)	CZE (Czech Republic)	GBR (United Kingdom)	RSM (San Marino)	ARA (Aragon)	JPN (Japan)	AUS (Australia)	MAL (Malaysia)	VAL (Valencian Community)	Pts

Although KTM and Honda finished with identical points totals of 384, KTM was crowned manufacturers' champion on countback by virtue of their 10 race wins to Honda's 8.
