= Joe Irving =

British motorcycle racer

- Nationality: British
- Born: 8 June 1998 (age 28); Holmfirth, England, United Kingdom
Motorcycle racing career statistics
Moto3 World Championship
Active years	2014
Manufacturers	KTM
Championships	0
2014 championship position	NC (0 pts)
Starts / Wins / Podiums / Poles / F. laps / Points; 1 / 0 / 0 / 0 / 0 / 0

Joe Irving (born 8 June 1998) is a British motorcycle racer.

== Career statistics ==
=== British 125 Championship ===
Year	Bike	1	2	3	4	5	6	7	8	9	10	11	12	Pos	Pts
2011	Honda	BRH; 15	OUL; 8	CRO; Ret	THR; 5	KNO; 2	SNE; 15	OUL; 6	BRH; 6	CAD; 10	DON; Ret	SIL; DNS	BRH; 8	8th	75

=== Grand Prix motorcycle racing ===
==== By season ====
Season	Class	Motorcycle	Team	Number	Race	Win	Podium	Pole	FLap	Pts	Plcd
2014	Moto3	KTM	Redline Motorcycles/KTM UK	66	1	0	0	0	0	0	NC
Total					1	0	0	0	0	0	

==== Races by year ====
Year	Class	Bike	1	2	3	4	5	6	7	8	9	10	11	12	13	14	15	16	17	18	Pos.	Pts
2014	Moto3	KTM	QAT	AME	ARG	SPA	FRA	ITA	CAT	NED	GER	INP	CZE	GBR; Ret	RSM	ARA	JPN	AUS	MAL	VAL	NC	0
