= 2015 FIM CEV Moto3 Junior World Championship =

Motorcycle racing championship

2015 FIM CEV Moto3 Junior World Championship
Previous:	2014	Next:	2016
Support series: FIM CEV Moto2 European Championship; FIM CEV Superbike European Championship

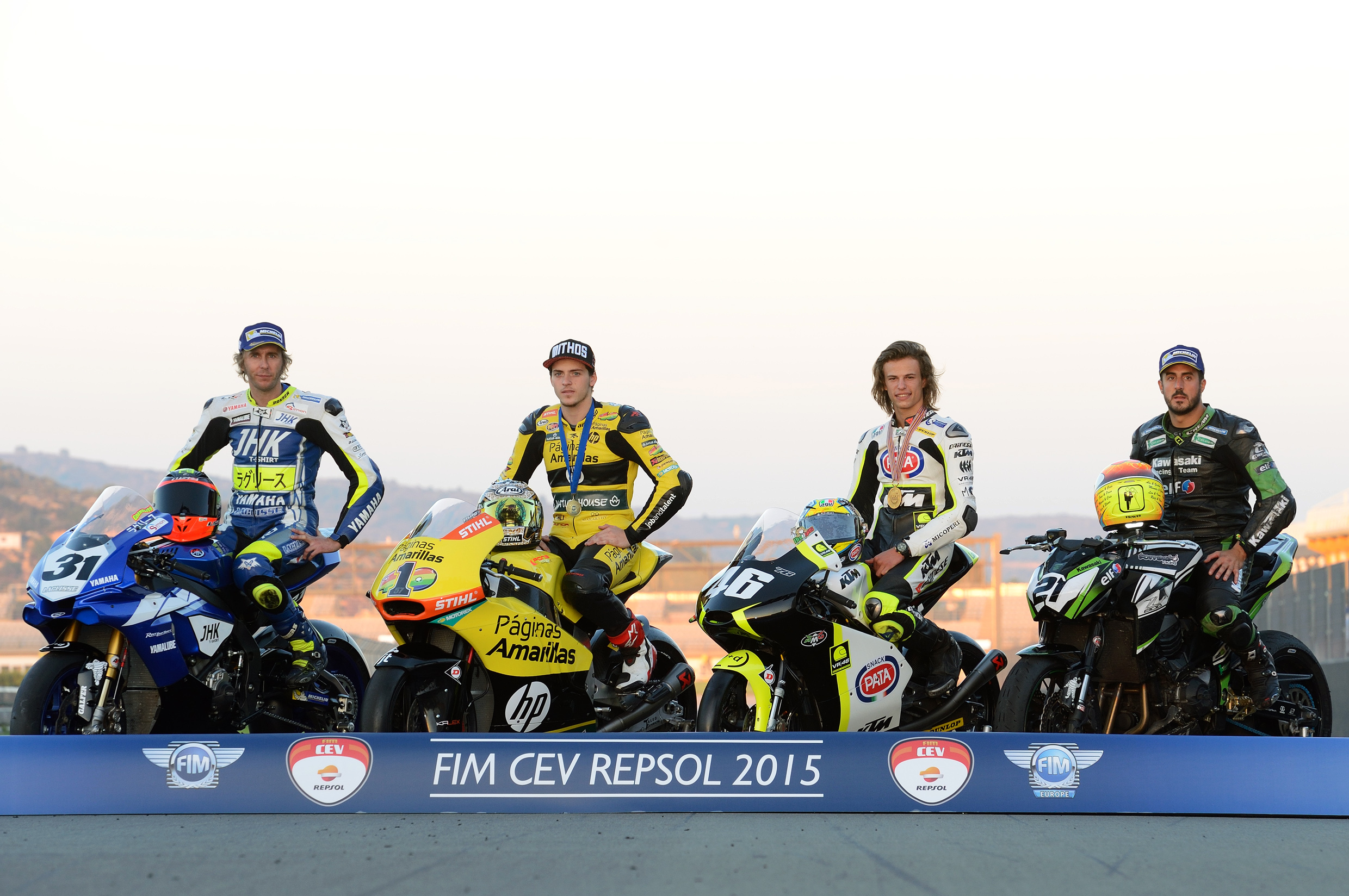
The champions of the 2015 FIM CEV Repsol

The 2015 FIM CEV Moto3 Junior World Championship was the fourth CEV Moto3 season and the second under the FIM banner. The season was held over 12 races at 8 meetings, began on 26 April at Algarve and finished on 15 November at Valencia.

== Calendar ==
Round	Date	Circuit	Pole position	Fastest lap	Race winner	Winning constructor	Sources
1	26 April	(Portugal) Algarve	(Spain) Joan Mir	(Italy) Nicolò Bulega	(Spain) Joan Mir	(Japan) Honda	
2	16 May	(France) Le Mans	(Spain) Arón Canet	(Netherlands) Bo Bendsneyder	(Spain) Arón Canet	(Japan) Honda	
3	21 June	(Spain) Catalunya	(Spain) Joan Mir	(Spain) Albert Arenas	(Spain) Arón Canet	(Japan) Honda	
3	21 June	(Spain) Catalunya	(Spain) Joan Mir	(Malaysia) Khairul Idham Pawi	(Spain) Joan Mir	(Japan) Honda	
4	5 July	(Spain) Aragón	(Spain) Joan Mir	(Spain) Joan Mir	(Spain) Joan Mir	(Japan) Honda	
4	5 July	(Spain) Aragón	(Spain) Joan Mir	(Spain) Joan Mir	(Spain) Joan Mir	(Japan) Honda	
5	6 September	(Spain) Albacete	(Spain) Arón Canet	(Italy) Lorenzo Dalla Porta	(Spain) Arón Canet	(Japan) Honda	
6	4 October	(Spain) Navarra	(Spain) Arón Canet	(Spain) Arón Canet	(Spain) Arón Canet	(Japan) Honda	
7	1 November	(Spain) Jerez	(Italy) Nicolò Bulega	(Italy) Nicolò Bulega	(Spain) Albert Arenas	(Sweden) Husqvarna	
7	1 November	(Spain) Jerez	(Italy) Nicolò Bulega	(Spain) Joan Mir	(Italy) Nicolò Bulega	(Austria) KTM	
8	15 November	(Spain) Valencia	(Italy) Nicolò Bulega	(Italy) Nicolò Bulega	(Spain) Albert Arenas	(Sweden) Husqvarna	
8	15 November	(Spain) Valencia	(Italy) Nicolò Bulega	(Italy) Lorenzo Dalla Porta	(Spain) Albert Arenas	(Sweden) Husqvarna	

== Entry list ==
Team	Bike	No.	Rider	Rounds
(Italy) SIC58 Squadra Corse	KTM	4	(Italy) Tony Arbolino	All
(Italy) SIC58 Squadra Corse	KTM	43	(Italy) Stefano Valtulini	All
(Spain) Junior Team Estrella Galicia 0,0	Honda	5	(Spain) Jaume Masiá	All
(Spain) Junior Team Estrella Galicia 0,0	Honda	44	(Spain) Arón Canet	All
(Spain) Junior Team Estrella Galicia 0,0	Honda	81	(Japan) Sena Yamada	All
(Finland) Ajo Motorsport	KTM	6	(Italy) Cristiano Carpi	1–5
(Finland) Ajo Motorsport	KTM	14	(Finland) Patrik Pulkkinen	3
(Italy) Motomex Worldwide Race Team	Mahindra	8	(Mexico) Gabriel Martínez-Ábrego	5, 7–8
(Spain) Aspar Team Mahindra	Mahindra	10	(Spain) David Sanchís	1–3
(Spain) Aspar Team Mahindra	Mahindra	12	(Italy) Marco Bezzecchi	4–8
(Spain) Aspar Team Mahindra	Mahindra	47	(Spain) Aarón Polanco	All
(Spain) Machado-Leopard Came (Spain) Machado-Leopard Junior Team (Spain) Grupo Machado	Honda	10	(Spain) David Sanchis	5–6
(Spain) Machado-Leopard Came (Spain) Machado-Leopard Junior Team (Spain) Grupo Machado	Honda	21	(Spain) Vicente Pérez	1–2
(Spain) Machado-Leopard Came (Spain) Machado-Leopard Junior Team (Spain) Grupo Machado	Honda	36	(Spain) Joan Mir	1–4
(Spain) Machado-Leopard Came (Spain) Machado-Leopard Junior Team (Spain) Grupo Machado	Ioda Honda	36	(Spain) Joan Mir	5–7
(Spain) Machado-Leopard Came (Spain) Machado-Leopard Junior Team (Spain) Grupo Machado	Ioda Honda	19	(Spain) Rufino Florido	8
(Spain) Machado-Leopard Came (Spain) Machado-Leopard Junior Team (Spain) Grupo Machado	KTM	36	(Spain) Joan Mir	8
(Spain) LaGlisse Academy	Husqvarna	11	(Spain) Albert Arenas	All
(Spain) LaGlisse Academy	Husqvarna	23	(Spain) Raúl Fernández	8
(Spain) LaGlisse Academy	Husqvarna	48	(Italy) Lorenzo Dalla Porta	All
(Spain) LaGlisse Academy	Husqvarna	73	(Italy) Davide Pizzoli	All
(Netherlands) Dutch Racing Team	Honda	13	(Netherlands) Walid Soppe	8
(Netherlands) Dutch Racing Team	Honda	80	(Netherlands) Bo Bendsneyder	1–7
(Spain) Monlau Repsol Technical School	Monlau Engineering	15	(Spain) Marc García	8
(Spain) Bullit Cuna de Campeones	MIR Racing	21	(Spain) Vicente Pérez	5–8
(Spain) Bullit Cuna de Campeones	MIR Racing	52	(Spain) Pedro Soler	1
(Spain) Procercasa-42 Motorsport	KTM	22	(Italy) Filippo Fuligni	7–8
(Spain) Procercasa-42 Motorsport	KTM	23	(Spain) Raúl Fernández	3, 7
(Spain) Procercasa-42 Motorsport	KTM	42	(Spain) Álex Ruiz	7–8
(Spain) Procercasa-42 Motorsport	KTM	67	(Spain) Gerard Riu	3, 7–8
(Spain) TLP Armstrong Saez Team	Suter Honda	26	(Spain) Daniel Sáez	7
(France) TFC Racing	TSR Honda	27	(France) Enzo De La Vega	2
(Italy) Ongetta Junior Team	FTR Honda	28	(Spain) Juan Antonio Bellver	1–2
(Italy) Ongetta Junior Team	Honda	29	(Spain) Juanjo Núñez	All
(Italy) Ongetta Junior Team	Suter	90	(France) Enzo Boulom	3, 6–7
(Italy) Ongetta Junior Team	FTR Honda	90	(France) Enzo Boulom	8
(Japan) Asia Talent Team	Honda	31	(Japan) Yuta Date	All
(Japan) Asia Talent Team	Honda	32	(Japan) Kaito Toba	All
(Japan) Asia Talent Team	Honda	33	(Malaysia) Adam Norrodin	All
(Japan) Asia Talent Team	Honda	71	(Japan) Ayumu Sasaki	8
(Spain) H43 Team Nobby Blumaq-Talasur	KTM	40	(Australia) Lawson Walters	All
(Spain) RBA Racing Team	KTM	41	(France) Simon Danilo	1–5
(Spain) RBA Racing Team	KTM	84	(Belgium) Loris Cresson	1–3
(Italy) Junior Team VR46 Riders Academy	KTM	46	(Italy) Nicolò Bulega	All
(Spain) Bradol Larresport	Honda	49	(Spain) Aleix Viu	1–5
(United Kingdom) Racing Steps Foundation	FTR KTM	69	(United Kingdom) Rory Skinner	6–8
(Netherlands) 71Workx.com-RW Racing GP	Kalex KTM	71	(Netherlands) Thomas van Leeuwen	3, 5
(United Kingdom) KRP Racing (United Kingdom) KRP	KRP KTM	72	(Germany) Christoph Beinlich	8
(United Kingdom) KRP Racing (United Kingdom) KRP	FTR KTM	91	(Belgium) Martin Vanhaeren	All
(Spain) TMR-Competicion	KTM	77	(Italy) Lorenzo Petrarca	All
(Spain) TMR-Competicion	KTM	84	(Belgium) Loris Cresson	5–6
(France) FFM	Mahindra	90	(France) Enzo Boulom	2, 4
(Sweden) Nordgren Racing	Honda	93	(Sweden) William Svärd	8
(Germany) Saxoprint-RTG	FTR Honda	97	(Germany) Maximilian Kappler	All
(Japan) Honda Team Asia	TSR Honda	98	(Malaysia) Khairul Idham Pawi	1
(Japan) Honda Team Asia	Honda	98	(Malaysia) Khairul Idham Pawi	2–8

== Championship standings ==
Scoring system

Points are awarded to the top fifteen finishers. A rider has to finish the race to earn points.

Position	**1st**	**2nd**	**3rd**	**4th**	**5th**	**6th**	**7th**	**8th**	**9th**	**10th**	**11th**	**12th**	**13th**	**14th**	**15th**
Points	25	20	16	13	11	10	9	8	7	6	5	4	3	2	1

=== Riders' championships ===
Pos.	Rider	Bike	ALG (Portugal)	LMS (France)	CAT (Spain)		ARA (Spain)		ALB (Spain)	NAV (Spain)	JER (Spain)		VAL (Spain)		Pts
1	(Italy) Nicolò Bulega	KTM	3	6	3	4	7	5	2	2	**2**	**1**	**4**	**3**	189
2	(Spain) Albert Arenas	Husqvarna	5	Ret	4	5	6	3	3	4	1	2	1	1	185
3	(Spain) Arón Canet	Honda	2	**1**	1	2	3	Ret	**1**	**1**	DNS	DNS	Ret	2	176
4	(Spain) Joan Mir	Honda	**1**	Ret	**Ret**	**1**	**1**	**1**							153
4	(Spain) Joan Mir	Ioda Honda							Ret	3	3	23			153
4	(Spain) Joan Mir	KTM											2	15	153
5	(Spain) Jaume Masiá	Honda	8	Ret	Ret	9	4	2	8	6	8	4	5	7	107
6	(Malaysia) Khairul Idham Pawi	TSR Honda	9												99
6	(Malaysia) Khairul Idham Pawi	Honda		2	2	3	9	6	7	12	Ret	16	10	18	99
7	(Netherlands) Bo Bendsneyder	Honda	4	3	6	7	12	8	6	13	4	9			93
8	(Italy) Stefano Valtulini	KTM	7	8	Ret	8	2	Ret	4	10	14	14	9	10	81
9	(Italy) Lorenzo Dalla Porta	Husqvarna	6	5	5	12	5	Ret	Ret	Ret	5	3	23	12	78
10	(Japan) Sena Yamada	Honda	12	4	Ret	6	Ret	9	16	9	6	8	8	6	77
11	(Italy) Lorenzo Petrarca	KTM	14	10	7	10	14	Ret	12	14	7	7	Ret	14	51
12	(Italy) Tony Arbolino	KTM	21	DNS	Ret	22	Ret	12	11	7	16	5	Ret	4	42
13	(Italy) Davide Pizzoli	Husqvarna	20	13	8	19	13	4	15	5	Ret	Ret	DNS	DNS	39
14	(Spain) Raúl Fernández	KTM			13	15					9	10			35
14	(Spain) Raúl Fernández	Husqvarna											6	8	35
15	(Japan) Yuta Date	Honda	18	20	11	17	16	11	10	15	13	6	DNS	DNS	30
16	(Italy) Marco Bezzecchi	Mahindra					8	7	Ret	8	22	17	12	Ret	29
17	(Spain) Aarón Polanco	Mahindra	10	Ret	Ret	16	17	16	5	11	12	15	DNS	DNS	27
18	(Belgium) Martin Vanhaeren	FTR KTM	11	14	9	11	11	Ret	Ret	16	17	19	13	28	27
19	(United Kingdom) Rory Skinner	FTR KTM								Ret	15	12	7	5	25
20	(Japan) Kaito Toba	Honda	15	11	Ret	Ret	10	Ret	9	19	Ret	Ret	11	16	24
21	(Japan) Ayumu Sasaki	Honda											3	11	21
22	(Spain) Gerard Riu	KTM			Ret	13					10	11	Ret	13	17
23	(Spain) Vicente Pérez	Honda	Ret	18											16
23	(Spain) Vicente Pérez	MIR Racing							Ret	Ret	11	13	20	9	16
24	(Germany) Maximilian Kappler	FTR Honda	17	15	12	14	15	13	Ret	18	Ret	18	14	21	13
25	(Spain) David Sanchís	Mahindra	13	7	Ret	21									12
25	(Spain) David Sanchís	Honda							17	Ret					12
26	(France) Enzo Boulom	Mahindra		12			Ret	10							12
26	(France) Enzo Boulom	Suter			14	Ret				17	DNS	DNS			12
26	(France) Enzo Boulom	FTR Honda											Ret	23	12
27	(France) Simon Danilo	KTM	Ret	9	17	25	20	Ret							7
28	(Netherlands) Thomas van Leeuwen	Kalex KTM			10	20			Ret						6
29	(Spain) Aleix Viu	Honda	Ret	17	Ret	Ret	19	14	13						5
30	(Malaysia) Adam Norrodin	Honda	Ret	16	Ret	18	18	15	14	20	18	21	15	22	4
31	(Australia) Lawson Walters	KTM	Ret	21	15	24	21	DNQ	18	Ret	20	22	19	25	1
	(Netherlands) Walid Soppe	FTR Honda											16	19	0
	(Finland) Patrik Pulkkinen	KTM			16	23									0
	(Belgium) Loris Cresson	KTM	16	19	Ret	26			19	21					0
	(Spain) Marc García	Monlau Engineering											Ret	17	0
	(Spain) Álex Ruiz	KTM									19	20	17	20	0
	(Italy) Cristiano Carpi	KTM	22	23	18	Ret	22	17							0
	(Germany) Christoph Beinlich	KRP KTM											18	24	0
	(Spain) Juanjo Núñez	Honda	23	25	19	27	23	18	20	22	Ret	25	DNS	DNS	0
	(Spain) Pedro Soler	MIR Racing	19												0
	(Mexico) Gabriel Martínez-Ábrego	Mahindra							21		23	26	21	27	0
	(Spain) Daniel Sáez	Suter Honda									21	24			0
	(Italy) Filippo Fuligni	KTM									Ret	Ret	22	26	0
	(France) Enzo de la Vega	TSR Honda		22											0
	(Spain) Juan Antonio Bellver	FTR Honda	Ret	24											0
	(Spain) Rufino Florido	Ioda Honda											Ret	Ret	0
	(Sweden) William Svärd	Honda											DNQ	DNQ	0
Pos.	Rider	Bike	ALG (Portugal)	LMS (France)	CAT (Spain)		ARA (Spain)		ALB (Spain)	NAV (Spain)	JER (Spain)		VAL (Spain)		Pts

Colour	Result
Gold	Winner
Silver	Second place
Bronze	Third place
Green	Points classification
Blue	Non-points classification
Blue	Non-classified finish (NC)
Purple	Retired, not classified (Ret)
Red	Did not qualify (DNQ)
Red	Did not pre-qualify (DNPQ)
Black	Disqualified (DSQ)
White	Did not start (DNS)
White	Withdrew (WD)
White	Race cancelled (C)
Blank	Did not practice (DNP)
Blank	Did not arrive (DNA)
Blank	Excluded (EX)

**Bold** – Pole position
Italics – Fastest lap

=== Constructors' championship ===
Pos	Constructor	ALG (Portugal)	LMS (France)	CAT (Spain)		ARA (Spain)		ALB (Spain)	NAV (Spain)	JER (Spain)		VAL (Spain)		Points
1	(Japan) Honda	1	1	1	1	1	1	1	1	4	4	3	2	262
2	(Austria) KTM	3	6	3	4	2	4	2	2	2	1	2	3	209
3	(Sweden) Husqvarna	5	5	4	5	5	3	3	4	1	2	1	1	197
4	(India) Mahindra	10	12	Ret	14	8	6	5	8	11	13	11	27	62
5	(Italy) Ioda Honda							Ret	3	3	23	Ret	Ret	32
6	(Japan) TSR Honda	9	22											7
7	(Switzerland) Suter			14	Ret				17	21	24			2

== See also ==
- 2015 FIM CEV Moto2 European Championship season
