= Prüstel GP =

German motorcycle racing team

- 2023 name: CFMoto Racing Prüstel GP
- Base: Oberlungwitz, Germany
- Motorcycle: CFMoto Moto3
- Tyres: Dunlop
- Riders' Championships: IDM Moto3: 2013: Max Kappler

Prüstel GP was a motorcycle racing team based in Oberlungwitz, Saxony, Germany. After the 2023 season, the team left from Moto3 World Championship.

== History ==
The team was founded in 2008 by Dirk Heidolf and his name Racing Team Germany. Then, it was taken over by Ingo Prüstel and his son Florian in 2016.

The team debuted in the 250cc class on 2008 season and only as a wildcard team with its rider Toni Wirsing.

In 2009 season, the team go through a period of full season in the 250cc and 125cc classes

Prüstel GP rider Jason Dupasquier died in an accident during qualifying for the 2021 Italian motorcycle Grand Prix.

== Results ==
Year	Class	Team name	Motorcycle	No.	Riders	Races	Wins	Podiums	Poles	F. laps	Points	Pos.
2008	250cc	Racing Team Germany	Honda RS250R	94	(Germany) Toni Wirsing	4	0	0	0	0	2	27th
2009	250cc	Racing Team Germany	Honda RS250R	8	(Switzerland) Bastien Chesaux	12 (16)	0	0	0	0	1 (3)	25th
2009	250cc	Racing Team Germany	Honda RS250R	73	(Japan) Shuhei Aoyama	4 (5)	0	0	0	0	17 (27)	19th
2009	125cc	Racing Team Germany	Honda RS125R	53	(Netherlands) Jasper Iwema	15	0	0	0	0	3	28th
2010	Moto2	Racing Team Germany	Suter MMX	41	(Germany) Arne Tode	10	0	0	0	0	2	38th
2010	Moto2	Racing Team Germany	Suter MMX	28	(Japan) Kazuki Watanabe	4	0	0	0	0	0	NC
2010	Moto2	Racing Team Germany	Suter MMX	31	(Spain) Carmelo Morales	2 (3)	0	0	0	0	0	NC
2010	125cc	Racing Team Germany	Aprilia RSW 125	71	(Japan) Tomoyoshi Koyama	17	0	1	0	0	127	8th
2010	125cc	Racing Team Germany	Aprilia RSW 125	84	(Czech Republic) Jakub Kornfeil	17	0	0	0	0	28	17th
2011	125cc	Intact-Racing Team Germany	Aprilia RSA 125	11	(Germany) Sandro Cortese	17	2	6	1	2	225	4th
2012	Moto3	Racing Team Germany	Honda-FTR M312	96	(France) Louis Rossi	17	1	1	0	0	86	11th
2012	Moto3	Racing Team Germany	Honda NSF250R	9	(Germany) Toni Finsterbusch	6 (15)	0	0	0	0	0 (7)	30th
2013	Moto3	Caretta Technology – RTG	Honda-FTR M313	8	(Australia) Jack Miller	17	0	0	0	0	110	7th
2013	Moto3	Caretta Technology – RTG	Honda-FTR M313	17	(United Kingdom) John McPhee	17	0	0	0	0	24	19th
2014	Moto3	SaxoPrint–RTG	Honda NSF250RW	7	(Spain) Efrén Vázquez	18	2	7	1	2	222	4th
2014	Moto3	SaxoPrint–RTG	Honda NSF250RW	17	(United Kingdom) John McPhee	18	0	0	0	0	77	13th
2014	Moto3	SaxoPrint–RTG	FTR M314	97	(Germany) Maximilian Kappler	1	0	0	0	0	0	NC
2015	Moto3	SaxoPrint–RTG	Honda NSF250RW	10	(France) Alexis Masbou	18	1	1	1	0	78	13th
2015	Moto3	SaxoPrint–RTG	Honda NSF250RW	17	(United Kingdom) John McPhee	18	0	1	1	0	92	11th
2015	Moto3	SaxoPrint–RTG	Honda-FTR M315	97	(Germany) Maximilian Kappler	2	0	0	0	0	0	NC
2016	Moto3	Peugeot MC Saxoprint KRM-RZT	Peugeot MGP3O	10	(France) Alexis Masbou	9	0	0	0	0	0	37th
2016	Moto3	Peugeot MC Saxoprint KRM-RZT	Peugeot MGP3O	17	(United Kingdom) John McPhee	16	1	1	0	0	48	22nd
2016	Moto3	Peugeot MC Saxoprint KRM-RZT	Peugeot MGP3O	12	(Spain) Albert Arenas	9 (12)	0	0	0	0	2	35th
2016	Moto3	Peugeot MC Saxoprint KRM-RZT	Peugeot MGP3O	38	(Malaysia) Hafiq Azmi	1	0	0	0	0	5	33rd
2016	Moto3	Peugeot MC Saxoprint KRM-RZT	Peugeot MGP3O	63	(Spain) Vicente Pérez	1	0	0	0	0	0	46th
2016	Moto3	Peugeot MC Saxoprint KRM-RZT	KTM RC250GP	97	(Germany) Maximilian Kappler	1	0	0	0	0	0	40th
2017	Moto3	Peugeot MC Saxoprint	Peugeot MGP3O	4	(Finland) Patrik Pulkkinen	18	0	0	0	0	0	38th
2017	Moto3	Peugeot MC Saxoprint	Peugeot MGP3O	84	(Czech Republic) Jakub Kornfeil	18	0	0	0	0	26	22nd
2018	Moto3	Redox PrüstelGP	KTM RC250GP	12	(Italy) Marco Bezzecchi	18	3	9	2	0	214	3rd
2018	Moto3	Redox PrüstelGP	KTM RC250GP	84	(Czech Republic) Jakub Kornfeil	18	0	1	1	0	116	8th
2019	Moto3	Redox PrüstelGP	KTM RC250GP	12	(Czech Republic) Filip Salač	19	0	0	0	0	32	23rd
2019	Moto3	Redox PrüstelGP	KTM RC250GP	84	(Czech Republic) Jakub Kornfeil	19	0	1	0	0	78	14th
2020	Moto3	CarXpert Prüstel GP	KTM RC250GP	50	(Switzerland) Jason Dupasquier	15	0	0	0	0	0	28th
2020	Moto3	CarXpert Prüstel GP	KTM RC250GP	70	(Belgium) Barry Baltus	14	0	0	0	0	0	26th
2020	Moto3	CarXpert Prüstel GP	KTM RC250GP	60	(Germany) Dirk Geiger	1	0	0	0	0	0	33rd
2021	Moto3	CarXpert Prüstel GP	KTM RC250GP	6	(Japan) Ryusei Yamanaka	16	0	0	0	0	47	20th
2021	Moto3	CarXpert Prüstel GP	KTM RC250GP	50	(Switzerland) Jason Dupasquier^{†}	5	0	0	0	0	27	24th
2021	Moto3	CarXpert Prüstel GP	KTM RC250GP	12	(Czech Republic) Filip Salač	9 (17)	0	0 (1)	0 (1)	0	36 (71)	16th
2022	Moto3	CFMoto Racing Prüstel GP	CFMoto Moto3	43	(Spain) Xavier Artigas	20	0	0	0	0	83	16th
2022	Moto3	CFMoto Racing Prüstel GP	CFMoto Moto3	99	(Spain) Carlos Tatay	20	0	1	1	0	87	15th
2023	Moto3	CFMoto Racing Prüstel GP	CFMoto Moto3	43	(Spain) Xavier Artigas	20	0	1	0	0	77	15th
2023	Moto3	CFMoto Racing Prüstel GP	CFMoto Moto3	66	(Australia) Joel Kelso	17	0	1	0	0	61	17th
2023	Moto3	CFMoto Racing Prüstel GP	CFMoto Moto3	92	(Spain) David Almansa	2 (5)	0	0	0	0	0	32nd

Key
Regular rider
Replacement rider
Wildcard rider
Replacement/wildcard rider

† – Rider deceased
