= Maximilian Kappler =

German motorcycle racer (born 1997)

- Nationality: German
- Born: 1 October 1997 (age 29); Lichtenstein, Saxony, Germany
- Current team: Freudenberg KTM WorldSSP Team
- Bike number: 97
Motorcycle racing career statistics
Moto3 World Championship
Active years	2014–2016
Manufacturers	FTR, FTR Honda, KTM
Championships	0
2016 championship position	NC (0 pts)
Starts / Wins / Podiums / Poles / F. laps / Points; 4 / 0 / 0 / 0 / 0 / 0
Supersport 300 World Championship
Active years	2017
Manufacturers	Yamaha
Championships	0
2017 championship position	26th (8 pts)
Starts / Wins / Podiums / Poles / F. laps / Points; 1 / 0 / 0 / 0 / 0 / 8

Maximilian Kappler (born 1 October 1997 in Lichtenstein) is a German motorcycle racer. He competes in Supersport 300 World Championship aboard a KTM RC390. He was the IDM Moto3 champion in 2013.

== Career statistics ==
=== FIM CEV Moto3 Junior World Championship ===
==== Races by year ====
(key) (Races in bold indicate pole position, races in italics indicate fastest lap)

Year	Bike	1	2	3	4	5	6	7	8	9	10	11	12	Pos	Pts
2014	FTR Honda	JER1; Ret	JER2; DNS	LMS; 23	ARA; 19	CAT1; 20	CAT2; 25	ALB; 31	NAV; 15	ALG; 23	VAL1; 23	VAL2; Ret		33rd	1
2015	FTR Honda	ALG; 17	LMS; 15	CAT1; 12	CAT2; 14	ARA1; 15	ARA2; 13	ALB; Ret	NAV; 18	JER1; Ret	JER2; 8	VAL1; 14	VAL2; 21	24th	13
2016	KTM	VAL1; 16	VAL2; 17	LMS; 21	ARA; 21	CAT1; 20	CAT2; 19	ALB; 20	ALG; 14	JER1; 23	JER2; 25	VAL1; 22	VAL2; 27	33rd	2

=== Grand Prix motorcycle racing ===
==== By season ====
Season	Class	Motorcycle	Team	Race	Win	Podium	Pole	FLap	Pts	Plcd
2014	Moto3	FTR	SaxoPrint-RTG	1	0	0	0	0	0	NC
2015	Moto3	FTR Honda	SAXOPRINT-RTG	2	0	0	0	0	0	NC
2016	Moto3	KTM	KRM-RZT	1	0	0	0	0	0	NC
Total				**4**	**0**	**0**	**0**	**0**	**0**	

==== Races by year ====
(key) (Races in bold indicate pole position; races in italics indicate fastest lap)

Year	Class	Bike	1	2	3	4	5	6	7	8	9	10	11	12	13	14	15	16	17	18	Pos	Pts
2014	Moto3	FTR	QAT	AME	ARG	SPA	FRA	ITA	CAT	NED	GER; 21	INP	CZE	GBR	RSM	ARA	JPN	AUS	MAL	VAL	NC	0
2015	Moto3	FTR Honda	QAT	AME	ARG	SPA	FRA	ITA	CAT	NED	GER; Ret	INP	CZE; Ret	GBR	RSM	ARA	JPN	AUS	MAL	VAL	NC	0
2016	Moto3	KTM	QAT	ARG	AME	SPA	FRA	ITA	CAT	NED	GER; 19	AUT	CZE	GBR	RSM	ARA	JPN	AUS	MAL	VAL	NC	0

=== Supersport 300 World Championship ===
==== Races by year ====
(key) (Races in bold indicate pole position; races in italics indicate fastest lap)

Year	Bike	1	2	3	4	5	6	7	8	9	Pos	Pts
2017	Yamaha	ARA	ASS	IMO	DON	MIS	LAU; 8	POR	MAG	JER	26th	8
