= Ernst Dubbink =

Dutch motorcycle racer

- Nationality: Dutch
- Born: 9 November 1988 (age 38); Almelo, Netherlands
- Current team: Ernst Dubbink Eveno racing
- Bike number: 61
- Website: ernstdubbink.com
Motorcycle racing career statistics
125cc World Championship
Active years	2008, 2010–2011
Manufacturers	Honda
Starts / Wins / Podiums / Poles / F. laps / Points; 3 / 0 / 0 / 0 / 0 / 0

Ernst Dubbink (born 9 November 1988) is a Dutch motorcycle racer. He won the ONK Dutch 125cc Championship in 2007 and the ONK Dutch Moto3 Championship in 2014. He races in the ADAC Northern Europe Moto3 Cup aboard a Honda NSF250R.

== Career statistics ==
=== FIM CEV Moto3 Junior World Championship ===
==== Races by year ====
(key) (Races in bold indicate pole position, races in italics indicate fastest lap)

Year	Bike	1	2	3	4	5	6	7	8	9	10	11	Pos	Pts
2014	Honda	JER1; DNS	JER2; DNS	LMS	ARA	CAT1	CAT2	ALB	NAV	ALG	VAL1	VAL2	NC	0

=== Grand Prix motorcycle racing ===
==== By season ====
Season	Class	Motorcycle	Team	Number	Race	Win	Podium	Pole	FLap	Pts	Plcd
2008	125cc	Honda	RV Racing Team	89	1	0	0	0	0	0	NC
2010	125cc	Honda	RV Racing Team	64	1	0	0	0	0	0	NC
2011	125cc	Honda	RV Racing Team	61	1	0	0	0	0	0	NC
Total					**3**	**0**	**0**	**0**	**0**	**0**	

==== Races by year ====
(key)

Year	Class	Bike	1	2	3	4	5	6	7	8	9	10	11	12	13	14	15	16	17	Pos.	Pts
2008	125cc	Honda	QAT	SPA	POR	CHN	FRA	ITA	CAT	GBR	NED; 29	GER	CZE	RSM	INP	JPN	AUS	MAL	VAL	NC	0
2010	125cc	Honda	QAT	SPA	FRA	ITA	GBR	NED; 24	CAT	GER	CZE	INP	RSM	ARA	JPN	MAL	AUS	POR	VAL	NC	0
2011	125cc	Honda	QAT	SPA	POR	FRA	CAT	GBR	NED; 32	ITA	GER	CZE	INP	RSM	ARA	JPN	AUS	MAL	VAL	NC	0
