= Jonas Geitner =

German motorcycle racer

- Nationality: German
- Born: 24 May 1996 (age 30)
- Current team: Kawasaki Schnock Team Motorex
- Bike number: 96
Motorcycle racing career statistics
Moto3 World Championship
Active years	2015
Manufacturers	KTM
Championships	0
2015 championship position	NC (0 pts)
Starts / Wins / Podiums / Poles / F. laps / Points; 1 / 0 / 0 / 0 / 0 / 0

Jonas Geitner (born 24 May 1996) is a German motorcycle racer. He currently races in the IDM Superstock 600 Championship aboard a Kawasaki ZX-6R. He was the IDM Moto3 GP champion in 2015.

== Career statistics ==
=== FIM CEV Moto3 Junior World Championship ===
==== Races by year ====
(key) (Races in bold indicate pole position; races in italics indicate fastest lap)

Year	Bike	1	2	3	4	5	6	7	8	9	10	11	Pos	Pts
2014	KTM	JER1; 21	JER2; 25	LMS; 26	ARA; Ret	CAT1; 21	CAT2; 20	ALB; 19	NAV; 21	ALG	VAL1; 12	VAL2; Ret	30th	4

=== Grand Prix motorcycle racing ===
==== By season ====
Season	Class	Motorcycle	Team	Race	Win	Podium	Pole	FLap	Pts	Plcd
2015	Moto3	KTM	Freudenberg Racing Team	1	0	0	0	0	0	NC
Total				**1**	**0**	**0**	**0**	**0**	**0**	

==== Races by year ====
Year	Class	Bike	1	2	3	4	5	6	7	8	9	10	11	12	13	14	15	16	17	18	Pos.	Pts
2015	Moto3	KTM	QAT	AME	ARG	SPA	FRA	ITA	CAT	NED	GER; 27	INP	CZE	GBR	RSM	ARA	JPN	AUS	MAL	VAL	NC	0
