= 2015 German motorcycle Grand Prix =

(Germany) 2015 German Grand Prix
Race details
- Race 9 of 18 races in the 2015 Grand Prix motorcycle racing season
- Date: 12 July 2015
- Official name: GoPro Motorrad Grand Prix Deutschland
- Location: Sachsenring
- Course: Permanent racing facility; 3.671 km (2.281 mi)

MotoGP
Pole position
Rider	(Spain) Marc Márquez	Honda
Time	1:20.336	
Fastest lap
Rider	(Spain) Marc Márquez	Honda
Time	1:21.530 on lap 10	
Podium
First	(Spain) Marc Márquez	Honda
Second	(Spain) Dani Pedrosa	Honda
Third	(Italy) Valentino Rossi	Yamaha

Moto2
Pole position
Rider	(France) Johann Zarco	Kalex
Time	1:24.044	
Fastest lap
Rider	(Italy) Franco Morbidelli	Kalex
Time	1:24.538 on lap 6	
Podium
First	(Belgium) Xavier Siméon	Kalex
Second	(France) Johann Zarco	Kalex
Third	(Spain) Álex Rins	Kalex

Moto3
Pole position
Rider	(United Kingdom) Danny Kent	Honda
Time	1:26.420	
Fastest lap
Rider	(United Kingdom) Danny Kent	Honda
Time	1:26.916 on lap 3	
Podium
First	(United Kingdom) Danny Kent	Honda
Second	(Spain) Efrén Vázquez	Honda
Third	(Italy) Enea Bastianini	Honda

The 2015 German motorcycle Grand Prix was the ninth round of the 2015 Grand Prix motorcycle racing season. It was held at the Sachsenring in Hohenstein-Ernstthal on 12 July 2015.

In the MotoGP class, Marc Márquez won his second race of the season from pole position. This was Márquez's sixth successive win from pole at the Sachsenring across all classes. His teammate Dani Pedrosa finished in second for Honda's first 1–2 finish of the season, and Valentino Rossi finished in third. At the end of the weekend, Rossi remained championship leader with a 13 point lead over Jorge Lorenzo.

Scott Redding and Andrea Dovizioso crashed out from the race before the halfway mark. Hiroshi Aoyama, who was riding as replacement for an injured Karel Abraham, also crashed out from the race. Mike Di Meglio and Claudio Corti, who was riding as replacement for an injured Stefan Bradl, were forced to retire from the race. The race also saw Michael Laverty return to MotoGP as a temporary replacement for Marco Melandri, who had left Gresini midseason after failing to score any points in the first eight races.

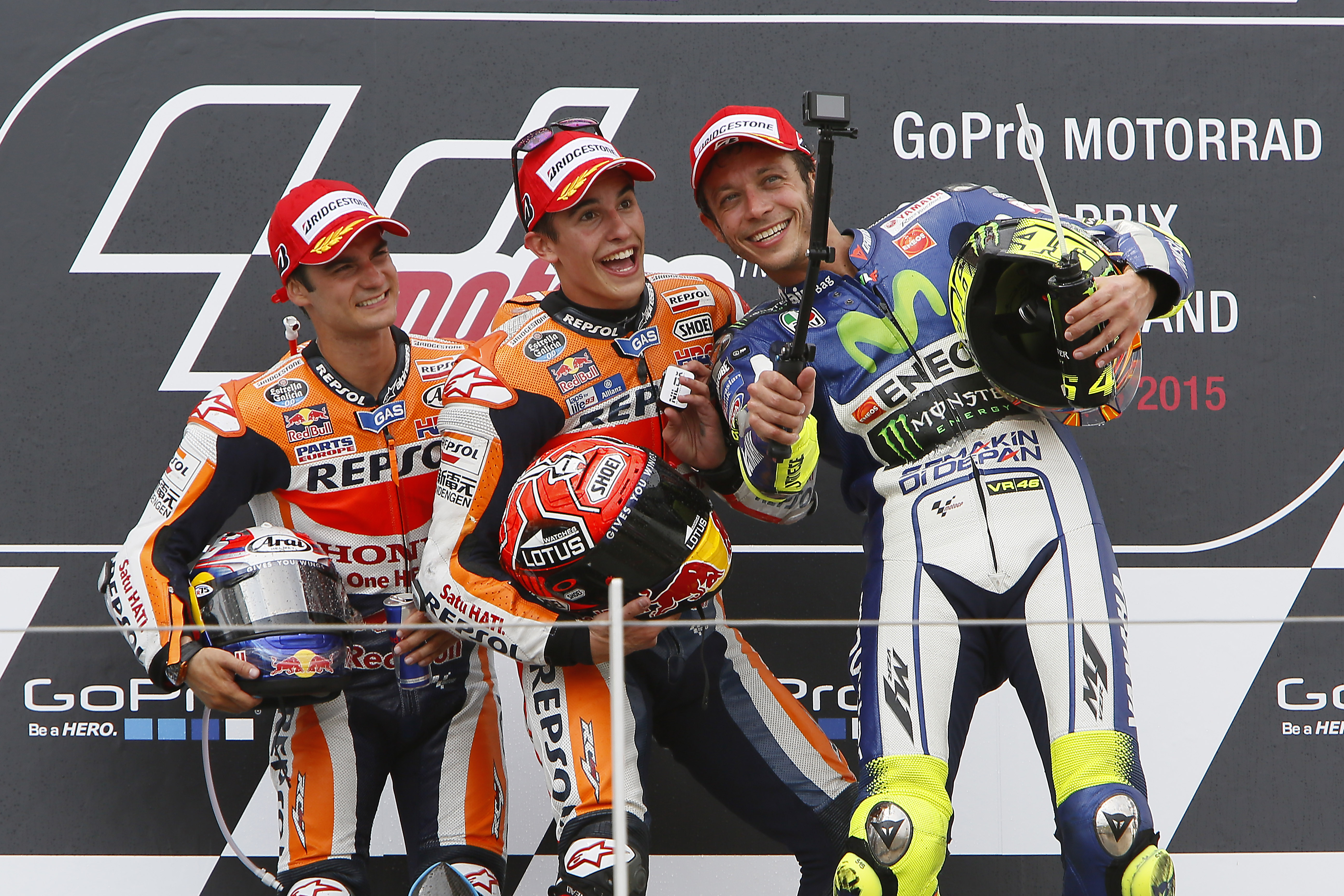
Dani Pedrosa, Marc Márquez and Valentino Rossi, celebrating by taking a selfie on the podium after finishing second, first and third at the MotoGP race.

== Classification ==
=== MotoGP ===
Pos.	No.	Rider	Team	Manufacturer	Laps	Time/Retired	Grid	Points
1	93	(Spain) Marc Márquez	Repsol Honda Team	Honda	30	41:01.087	1	25
2	26	(Spain) Dani Pedrosa	Repsol Honda Team	Honda	30	+2.226	2	20
3	46	(Italy) Valentino Rossi	Movistar Yamaha MotoGP	Yamaha	30	+5.608	6	16
4	99	(Spain) Jorge Lorenzo	Movistar Yamaha MotoGP	Yamaha	30	+9.928	3	13
5	29	(Italy) Andrea Iannone	Ducati Team	Ducati	30	+20.785	4	11
6	38	(United Kingdom) Bradley Smith	Monster Yamaha Tech 3	Yamaha	30	+23.215	9	10
7	35	(United Kingdom) Cal Crutchlow	CWM LCR Honda	Honda	30	+29.881	10	9
8	44	(Spain) Pol Espargaró	Monster Yamaha Tech 3	Yamaha	30	+34.953	8	8
9	9	(Italy) Danilo Petrucci	Octo Pramac Racing	Ducati	30	+35.875	15	7
10	41	(Spain) Aleix Espargaró	Team Suzuki Ecstar	Suzuki	30	+37.253	7	6
11	25	(Spain) Maverick Viñales	Team Suzuki Ecstar	Suzuki	30	+37.274	12	5
12	68	(Colombia) Yonny Hernández	Octo Pramac Racing	Ducati	30	+42.081	5	4
13	8	(Spain) Héctor Barberá	Avintia Racing	Ducati	30	+48.611	13	3
14	19	(Spain) Álvaro Bautista	Aprilia Racing Team Gresini	Aprilia	30	+50.687	16	2
15	43	(Australia) Jack Miller	CWM LCR Honda	Honda	30	+53.769	18	1
16	69	(United States) Nicky Hayden	Aspar MotoGP Team	Honda	30	+58.921	19	
17	50	(Republic of Ireland) Eugene Laverty	Aspar MotoGP Team	Honda	30	+1:02.738	23	
18	15	(San Marino) Alex de Angelis	E-Motion IodaRacing Team	ART	30	+1:03.122	17	
19	76	(France) Loris Baz	Athinà Forward Racing	Yamaha Forward	30	+1:11.162	20	
20	70	(United Kingdom) Michael Laverty	Aprilia Racing Team Gresini	Aprilia	30	+1:15.910	24	
Ret	71	(Italy) Claudio Corti	Athinà Forward Racing	Yamaha Forward	22	Retirement	25	
Ret	4	(Italy) Andrea Dovizioso	Ducati Team	Ducati	14	Accident	11	
Ret	7	(Japan) Hiroshi Aoyama	AB Motoracing	Honda	4	Accident	22	
Ret	63	(France) Mike Di Meglio	Avintia Racing	Ducati	3	Retirement	21	
Ret	45	(United Kingdom) Scott Redding	EG 0,0 Marc VDS	Honda	0	Accident	14	

=== Moto2 ===
Pos.	No.	Rider	Manufacturer	Laps	Time/Retired	Grid	Points
1	19	(Belgium) Xavier Siméon	Kalex	29	41:09.295	2	25
2	5	(France) Johann Zarco	Kalex	29	+0.083	1	20
3	40	(Spain) Álex Rins	Kalex	29	+1.646	12	16
4	3	(Italy) Simone Corsi	Kalex	29	+6.386	5	13
5	22	(United Kingdom) Sam Lowes	Speed Up	29	+9.284	9	11
6	12	(Switzerland) Thomas Lüthi	Kalex	29	+10.432	4	10
7	30	(Japan) Takaaki Nakagami	Kalex	29	+10.592	11	9
8	7	(Italy) Lorenzo Baldassarri	Kalex	29	+12.518	16	8
9	60	(Spain) Julián Simón	Speed Up	29	+14.862	15	7
10	77	(Switzerland) Dominique Aegerter	Kalex	29	+14.953	13	6
11	11	(Germany) Sandro Cortese	Kalex	29	+17.529	7	5
12	36	(Finland) Mika Kallio	Kalex	29	+18.820	10	4
13	4	(Switzerland) Randy Krummenacher	Kalex	29	+21.849	19	3
14	94	(Germany) Jonas Folger	Kalex	29	+22.362	8	2
15	49	(Spain) Axel Pons	Kalex	29	+23.275	14	1
16	55	(Malaysia) Hafizh Syahrin	Kalex	29	+23.429	17	
17	39	(Spain) Luis Salom	Kalex	29	+28.507	22	
18	73	(Spain) Álex Márquez	Kalex	29	+32.740	24	
19	88	(Spain) Ricard Cardús	Tech 3	29	+33.465	20	
20	70	(Switzerland) Robin Mulhauser	Kalex	29	+33.508	27	
21	2	(Switzerland) Jesko Raffin	Kalex	29	+55.191	26	
22	10	(Thailand) Thitipong Warokorn	Kalex	29	+57.449	28	
23	15	(Thailand) Ratthapark Wilairot	Suter	29	+57.776	25	
Ret	21	(Italy) Franco Morbidelli	Kalex	28	Accident	3	
Ret	1	(Spain) Tito Rabat	Kalex	28	Accident	6	
Ret	96	(France) Louis Rossi	Tech 3	25	Retirement	29	
Ret	23	(Germany) Marcel Schrötter	Tech 3	5	Accident	21	
Ret	25	(Malaysia) Azlan Shah	Kalex	5	Accident	23	
Ret	95	(Australia) Anthony West	Speed Up	4	Accident	18	
DNS	66	(Germany) Florian Alt	Suter		Did not start		
OFFICIAL MOTO2 REPORT

=== Moto3 ===
Pos.	No.	Rider	Manufacturer	Laps	Time/Retired	Grid	Points
1	52	(United Kingdom) Danny Kent	Honda	27	39:29.359	1	25
2	7	(Spain) Efrén Vázquez	Honda	27	+7.554	4	20
3	33	(Italy) Enea Bastianini	Honda	27	+9.603	5	16
4	5	(Italy) Romano Fenati	KTM	27	+9.629	12	13
5	23	(Italy) Niccolò Antonelli	Honda	27	+9.664	7	11
6	9	(Spain) Jorge Navarro	Honda	27	+9.807	11	10
7	41	(South Africa) Brad Binder	KTM	27	+9.837	8	9
8	10	(France) Alexis Masbou	Honda	27	+10.266	10	8
9	55	(Italy) Andrea Locatelli	Honda	27	+10.352	9	7
10	31	(Finland) Niklas Ajo	KTM	27	+11.558	13	6
11	65	(Germany) Philipp Öttl	KTM	27	+11.777	15	5
12	88	(Spain) Jorge Martín	Mahindra	27	+18.416	6	4
13	98	(Czech Republic) Karel Hanika	KTM	27	+18.426	2	3
14	84	(Czech Republic) Jakub Kornfeil	KTM	27	+28.782	21	2
15	95	(France) Jules Danilo	Honda	27	+28.892	19	1
16	11	(Belgium) Livio Loi	Honda	27	+28.958	14	
17	17	(United Kingdom) John McPhee	Honda	27	+29.218	23	
18	32	(Spain) Isaac Viñales	Husqvarna	27	+29.478	17	
19	63	(Malaysia) Zulfahmi Khairuddin	KTM	27	+29.750	16	
20	40	(South Africa) Darryn Binder	Mahindra	27	+45.844	18	
21	16	(Italy) Andrea Migno	KTM	27	+46.658	34	
22	29	(Italy) Stefano Manzi	Mahindra	27	+46.780	25	
23	2	(Australia) Remy Gardner	Mahindra	27	+46.840	24	
24	19	(Italy) Alessandro Tonucci	Mahindra	27	+46.965	22	
25	12	(Italy) Matteo Ferrari	Mahindra	27	+47.339	29	
26	91	(Argentina) Gabriel Rodrigo	KTM	27	+1:06.125	31	
27	45	(Germany) Jonas Geitner	KTM	27	+1:24.437	33	
Ret	22	(Spain) Ana Carrasco	KTM	23	Accident	27	
Ret	6	(Spain) María Herrera	Husqvarna	23	Accident	30	
Ret	24	(Japan) Tatsuki Suzuki	Mahindra	20	Accident	28	
Ret	97	(Germany) Maximilian Kappler	FTR Honda	12	Accident	32	
Ret	20	(France) Fabio Quartararo	Honda	5	Accident	3	
Ret	21	(Italy) Francesco Bagnaia	Mahindra	5	Retirement	20	
Ret	76	(Japan) Hiroki Ono	Honda	1	Retirement	26	
DNS	58	(Spain) Juan Francisco Guevara	Mahindra		Did not start		
DNS	44	(Portugal) Miguel Oliveira	KTM		Did not start		
OFFICIAL MOTO3 REPORT

== Championship standings after the race (MotoGP) ==
Below are the standings for the top seven riders and constructors after round nine has concluded.

Riders' Championship standings

Pos.	Rider	Points
1	(Italy) Valentino Rossi	179
2	(Spain) Jorge Lorenzo	166
3	(Italy) Andrea Iannone	118
4	(Spain) Marc Márquez	114
5	(Italy) Andrea Dovizioso	87
6	(United Kingdom) Bradley Smith	87
7	(Spain) Dani Pedrosa	67

Constructors' Championship standings

Pos.	Constructor	Points
1	(Japan) Yamaha	207
2	(Japan) Honda	159
3	(Italy) Ducati	143
4	(Japan) Suzuki	70
5	(Switzerland) Yamaha Forward	19
6	(Italy) Aprilia	13
7	(Italy) ART	1

Teams' Championship standings

Pos.	Team	Points
1	(Japan) Movistar Yamaha MotoGP	345
2	(Italy) Ducati Team	205
3	(Japan) Repsol Honda Team	186
4	(France) Monster Yamaha Tech 3	151
5	(Japan) Team Suzuki Ecstar	101
6	(Italy) Octo Pramac Racing	83
7	(Monaco) CWM LCR Honda	78

- Note: Only the top seven positions are included for both sets of standings.

Previous race: 2015 Dutch TT	FIM Grand Prix World Championship; 2015 season	Next race: 2015 Indianapolis Grand Prix
Previous race: 2014 German Grand Prix	German motorcycle Grand Prix	Next race: 2016 German Grand Prix
