= 2016 German motorcycle Grand Prix =

(Germany) 2016 German Grand Prix
Race details
- Race 9 of 18 races in the 2016 Grand Prix motorcycle racing season
- Date: 17 July 2016
- Official name: GoPro Motorrad Grand Prix Deutschland
- Location: Sachsenring
- Course: Permanent racing facility; 3.671 km (2.281 mi)

MotoGP
Pole position
Rider	(Spain) Marc Márquez	Honda
Time	1:21.160	
Fastest lap
Rider	(United Kingdom) Cal Crutchlow	Honda
Time	1:25.019 on lap 30	
Podium
First	(Spain) Marc Márquez	Honda
Second	(United Kingdom) Cal Crutchlow	Honda
Third	(Italy) Andrea Dovizioso	Ducati

Moto2
Pole position
Rider	(Japan) Takaaki Nakagami	Kalex
Time	1:24.274	
Fastest lap
Rider	(Belgium) Xavier Siméon	Speed Up
Time	1:36.619 on lap 20	
Podium
First	(France) Johann Zarco	Kalex
Second	(Germany) Jonas Folger	Kalex
Third	(Spain) Julián Simón	Speed Up

Moto3
Pole position
Rider	(Italy) Enea Bastianini	Honda
Time	1:27.129	
Fastest lap
Rider	(Malaysia) Khairul Idham Pawi	Honda
Time	1:42.544 on lap 5	
Podium
First	(Malaysia) Khairul Idham Pawi	Honda
Second	(Italy) Andrea Locatelli	KTM
Third	(Italy) Enea Bastianini	Honda

The 2016 German motorcycle Grand Prix was the ninth round of the 2016 MotoGP season. It was held at the Sachsenring in Hohenstein-Ernstthal on 17 July 2016.

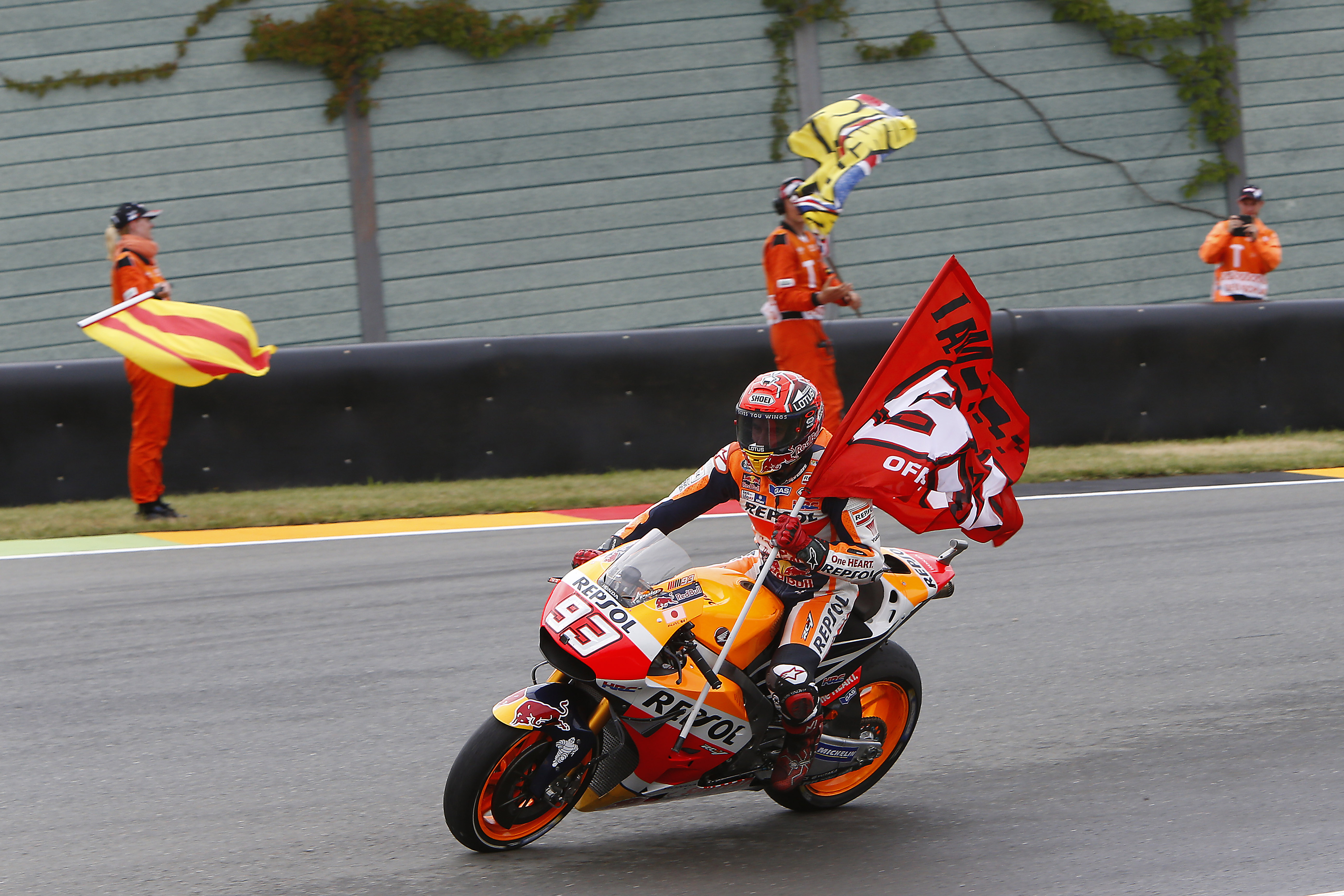
Marc Márquez, celebrating with his flag after winning the MotoGP race.

== Classification ==
=== MotoGP ===
Pos.	No.	Rider	Team	Manufacturer	Laps	Time/Retired	Grid	Points
1	93	(Spain) Marc Márquez	Repsol Honda Team	Honda	30	47:03.239	1	25
2	35	(United Kingdom) Cal Crutchlow	LCR Honda	Honda	30	+9.857	13	20
3	4	(Italy) Andrea Dovizioso	Ducati Team	Ducati	30	+11.613	7	16
4	45	(United Kingdom) Scott Redding	Octo Pramac Yakhnich	Ducati	30	+11.992	15	13
5	29	(Italy) Andrea Iannone	Ducati Team	Ducati	30	+22.755	9	11
6	26	(Spain) Dani Pedrosa	Repsol Honda Team	Honda	30	+25.920	10	10
7	43	(Australia) Jack Miller	Estrella Galicia 0,0 Marc VDS	Honda	30	+26.043	16	9
8	46	(Italy) Valentino Rossi	Movistar Yamaha MotoGP	Yamaha	30	+26.449	3	8
9	8	(Spain) Héctor Barberá	Avintia Racing	Ducati	30	+26.614	2	7
10	19	(Spain) Álvaro Bautista	Aprilia Racing Team Gresini	Aprilia	30	+31.274	18	6
11	50	(Republic of Ireland) Eugene Laverty	Pull & Bear Aspar Team	Ducati	30	+41.208	17	5
12	25	(Spain) Maverick Viñales	Team Suzuki Ecstar	Suzuki	30	+42.158	6	4
13	38	(United Kingdom) Bradley Smith	Monster Yamaha Tech 3	Yamaha	30	+1:03.129	14	3
14	41	(Spain) Aleix Espargaró	Team Suzuki Ecstar	Suzuki	30	+1:06.091	8	2
15	99	(Spain) Jorge Lorenzo	Movistar Yamaha MotoGP	Yamaha	30	+1:17.694	11	1
16	53	(Spain) Tito Rabat	Estrella Galicia 0,0 Marc VDS	Honda	29	+1 lap	20	
17	76	(France) Loris Baz	Avintia Racing	Ducati	28	+2 laps	19	
18	68	(Colombia) Yonny Hernández	Pull & Bear Aspar Team	Ducati	27	+3 laps	12	
Ret	44	(Spain) Pol Espargaró	Monster Yamaha Tech 3	Yamaha	17	Accident	5	
Ret	9	(Italy) Danilo Petrucci	Octo Pramac Yakhnich	Ducati	12	Accident Damage	4	
DNS	6	(Germany) Stefan Bradl	Aprilia Racing Team Gresini	Aprilia		Did not start		
Sources:

- Stefan Bradl suffered a concussion in the Sunday morning warm-up session.

=== Moto2 ===
Pos.	No.	Rider	Manufacturer	Laps	Time/Retired	Grid	Points
1	5	(France) Johann Zarco	Kalex	29	47:18.646	2	25
2	94	(Germany) Jonas Folger	Kalex	29	+0.059	13	20
3	60	(Spain) Julián Simón	Speed Up	29	+20.433	17	16
4	54	(Italy) Mattia Pasini	Kalex	29	+30.455	20	13
5	7	(Italy) Lorenzo Baldassarri	Kalex	29	+31.771	7	11
6	10	(Italy) Luca Marini	Kalex	29	+34.201	15	10
7	55	(Malaysia) Hafizh Syahrin	Kalex	29	+41.942	11	9
8	2	(Switzerland) Jesko Raffin	Kalex	29	+47.955	19	8
9	32	(Spain) Isaac Viñales	Tech 3	29	+49.759	24	7
10	77	(Switzerland) Dominique Aegerter	Kalex	29	+51.047	23	6
11	30	(Japan) Takaaki Nakagami	Kalex	29	+1:05.386	1	5
12	87	(Australia) Remy Gardner	Kalex	29	+1:13.865	21	4
13	70	(Switzerland) Robin Mulhauser	Kalex	29	+1:19.545	26	3
14	57	(Spain) Edgar Pons	Kalex	29	+1:30.502	27	2
15	11	(Germany) Sandro Cortese	Kalex	27	+2 laps	6	1
Ret	40	(Spain) Álex Rins	Kalex	26	Accident	3	
Ret	21	(Italy) Franco Morbidelli	Kalex	26	Accident	5	
Ret	22	(United Kingdom) Sam Lowes	Kalex	25	Accident	10	
Ret	73	(Spain) Álex Márquez	Kalex	24	Accident	8	
Ret	19	(Belgium) Xavier Siméon	Speed Up	22	Accident	18	
Ret	12	(Switzerland) Thomas Lüthi	Kalex	17	Accident	12	
Ret	49	(Spain) Axel Pons	Kalex	10	Accident	14	
Ret	14	(Thailand) Ratthapark Wilairot	Kalex	8	Accident	25	
Ret	24	(Italy) Simone Corsi	Speed Up	5	Accident	4	
Ret	97	(Spain) Xavi Vierge	Tech 3	5	Accident	22	
Ret	23	(Germany) Marcel Schrötter	Kalex	4	Accident	9	
Ret	44	(Portugal) Miguel Oliveira	Kalex	3	Accident	16	
DNS	52	(United Kingdom) Danny Kent	Kalex		Did not start		
OFFICIAL MOTO2 REPORT

- Danny Kent pulled out of the event after Friday practice due to broken ribs he suffered while karting earlier in the week.

=== Moto3 ===
Pos.	No.	Rider	Manufacturer	Laps	Time/Retired	Grid	Points
1	89	(Malaysia) Khairul Idham Pawi	Honda	27	47:07.763	20	25
2	55	(Italy) Andrea Locatelli	KTM	27	+11.131	2	20
3	33	(Italy) Enea Bastianini	Honda	27	+13.359	1	16
4	84	(Czech Republic) Jakub Kornfeil	Honda	27	+18.541	15	13
5	4	(Italy) Fabio Di Giannantonio	Honda	27	+20.620	22	11
6	17	(United Kingdom) John McPhee	Peugeot	27	+20.698	8	10
7	9	(Spain) Jorge Navarro	Honda	27	+20.910	5	9
8	41	(South Africa) Brad Binder	KTM	27	+23.333	6	8
9	95	(France) Jules Danilo	Honda	27	+30.318	7	7
10	21	(Italy) Francesco Bagnaia	Mahindra	27	+31.095	11	6
11	24	(Japan) Tatsuki Suzuki	Mahindra	27	+37.688	23	5
12	64	(Netherlands) Bo Bendsneyder	KTM	27	+45.005	4	4
13	19	(Argentina) Gabriel Rodrigo	KTM	27	+47.793	14	3
14	11	(Belgium) Livio Loi	Honda	27	+48.073	16	2
15	44	(Spain) Arón Canet	Honda	27	+56.921	3	1
16	10	(France) Alexis Masbou	Peugeot	27	+1:10.787	24	
17	65	(Germany) Philipp Öttl	KTM	27	+1:13.873	19	
18	5	(Italy) Romano Fenati	KTM	27	+1:14.813	17	
19	97	(Germany) Maximilian Kappler	KTM	27	+1:15.203	26	
20	43	(Italy) Stefano Valtulini	Mahindra	27	+1:15.434	29	
21	27	(Germany) Tim Georgi	KTM	27	+1:23.906	31	
22	22	(United Kingdom) Danny Webb	Mahindra	27	+1:38.548	32	
23	20	(France) Fabio Quartararo	KTM	26	+1 lap	12	
Ret	8	(Italy) Nicolò Bulega	KTM	14	Accident	21	
Ret	7	(Malaysia) Adam Norrodin	Honda	12	Accident	25	
Ret	76	(Japan) Hiroki Ono	Honda	11	Accident	9	
Ret	88	(Spain) Jorge Martín	Mahindra	10	Accident	10	
Ret	16	(Italy) Andrea Migno	KTM	10	Accident	27	
Ret	40	(South Africa) Darryn Binder	Mahindra	8	Accident	28	
Ret	58	(Spain) Juan Francisco Guevara	KTM	8	Accident	13	
Ret	77	(Italy) Lorenzo Petrarca	Mahindra	7	Accident	30	
Ret	36	(Spain) Joan Mir	KTM	0	Accident	18	
DNS	6	(Spain) María Herrera	KTM		Did not start		
DNS	23	(Italy) Niccolò Antonelli	Honda		Did not start		
DNS	3	(Italy) Fabio Spiranelli	Mahindra		Did not start		
OFFICIAL MOTO3 REPORT

- Maria Herrera (broken left wrist), Niccolo Antonelli (broken left collarbone) and Fabio Spiranelli (broken left hand) suffered injuries during the Saturday qualifying session.

== Championship standings after the race (MotoGP) ==
Below are the standings for the top five riders and constructors after round eight has concluded.

Riders' Championship standings

Pos.	Rider	Points
1	(Spain) Marc Marquez	170
2	(Spain) Jorge Lorenzo	122
3	(Italy) Valentino Rossi	111
4	(Spain) Dani Pedrosa	96
5	(Spain) Maverick Vinales	83

Constructors' Championship standings

Pos.	Constructor	Points
1	(Japan) Yamaha	186
2	(Japan) Honda	185
3	(Italy) Ducati	124
4	(Japan) Suzuki	89
5	(Italy) Aprilia	51

- Note: Only the top five positions are included for both sets of standings.

Previous race: 2016 Dutch TT	FIM Grand Prix World Championship; 2016 season	Next race: 2016 Austrian Grand Prix
Previous race: 2015 German Grand Prix	German motorcycle Grand Prix	Next race: 2017 German Grand Prix
