= 2014 Catalan motorcycle Grand Prix =

(Catalonia) 2014 Catalan Grand Prix
Race details
- Race 7 of 18 races in the 2014 Grand Prix motorcycle racing season
- Date: 15 June 2014
- Official name: Gran Premi Monster Energy de Catalunya
- Location: Circuit de Barcelona-Catalunya
- Course: Permanent racing facility; 4.727 km (2.937 mi)

MotoGP
Pole position
Rider	(Spain) Dani Pedrosa	Honda
Time	1:40.985	
Fastest lap
Rider	(Spain) Marc Márquez	Honda
Time	1:42.182 on lap 2	
Podium
First	(Spain) Marc Márquez	Honda
Second	(Italy) Valentino Rossi	Yamaha
Third	(Spain) Dani Pedrosa	Honda

Moto2
Pole position
Rider	(Spain) Esteve Rabat	Kalex
Time	1:46.569	
Fastest lap
Rider	(Spain) Esteve Rabat	Kalex
Time	1:47.094 on lap 3	
Podium
First	(Spain) Esteve Rabat	Kalex
Second	(Spain) Maverick Viñales	Kalex
Third	(France) Johann Zarco	Caterham Suter

Moto3
Pole position
Rider	(Spain) Álex Márquez	Honda
Time	1:50.232	
Fastest lap
Rider	(United Kingdom) John McPhee	Honda
Time	1:51.299 on lap 5	
Podium
First	(Spain) Álex Márquez	Honda
Second	(Italy) Enea Bastianini	KTM
Third	(Spain) Efrén Vázquez	Honda

The 2014 Catalan motorcycle Grand Prix was the seventh round of the 2014 MotoGP season. It was held at the Circuit de Barcelona-Catalunya in Montmeló on 15 June 2014. Enea Bastianini took his first podium finish in the Moto3 class in what was just his 7th race.

== Classification ==
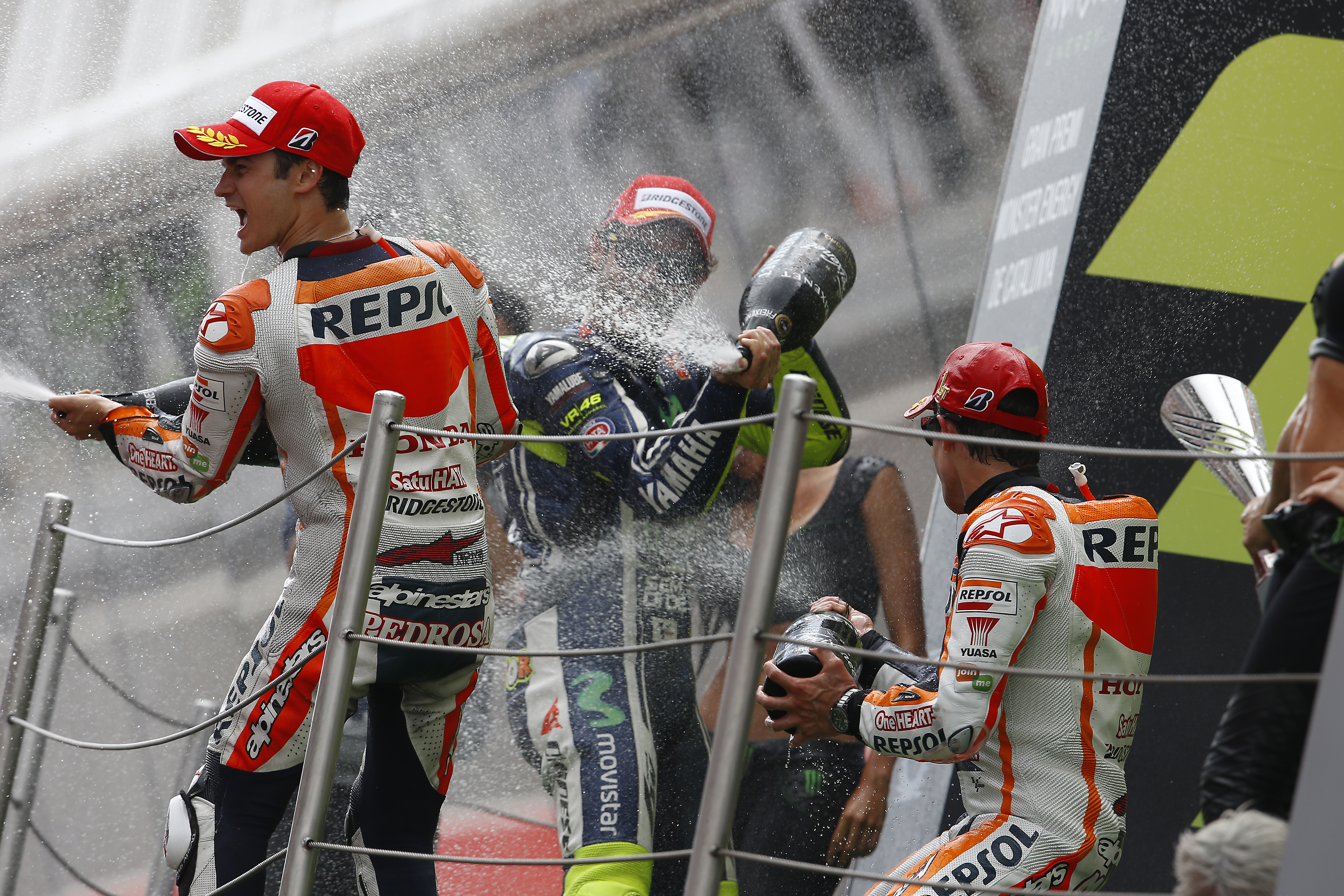
Dani Pedrosa, Valentino Rossi and Marc Márquez, spraying the champagne on the podium after finishing third, second and first in the MotoGP race.

=== MotoGP ===
Pos.	No.	Rider	Team	Manufacturer	Laps	Time/Retired	Grid	Points
1	93	(Spain) Marc Márquez	Repsol Honda Team	Honda	25	42:56.914	3	25
2	46	(Italy) Valentino Rossi	Movistar Yamaha MotoGP	Yamaha	25	+0.512	5	20
3	26	(Spain) Dani Pedrosa	Repsol Honda Team	Honda	25	+1.834	1	16
4	99	(Spain) Jorge Lorenzo	Movistar Yamaha MotoGP	Yamaha	25	+4.540	2	13
5	6	(Germany) Stefan Bradl	LCR Honda MotoGP	Honda	25	+11.148	4	11
6	41	(Spain) Aleix Espargaró	NGM Forward Racing	Forward Yamaha	25	+14.213	6	10
7	44	(Spain) Pol Espargaró	Monster Yamaha Tech 3	Yamaha	25	+16.127	10	9
8	4	(Italy) Andrea Dovizioso	Ducati Team	Ducati	25	+16.175	7	8
9	29	(Italy) Andrea Iannone	Pramac Racing	Ducati	25	+18.040	11	7
10	38	(United Kingdom) Bradley Smith	Monster Yamaha Tech 3	Yamaha	25	+24.781	8	6
11	68	(Colombia) Yonny Hernández	Energy T.I. Pramac Racing	Ducati	25	+37.153	9	5
12	69	(United States) Nicky Hayden	Drive M7 Aspar	Honda	25	+43.299	16	4
13	45	(United Kingdom) Scott Redding	Go&Fun Honda Gresini	Honda	25	+43.407	14	3
14	51	(Italy) Michele Pirro	Ducati Team	Ducati	25	+55.157	15	2
15	7	(Japan) Hiroshi Aoyama	Drive M7 Aspar	Honda	25	+59.191	20	1
16	23	(Australia) Broc Parkes	Paul Bird Motorsport	PBM	25	+1:00.906	19	
17	70	(United Kingdom) Michael Laverty	Paul Bird Motorsport	PBM	25	+1:01.284	21	
18	5	(United States) Colin Edwards	NGM Forward Racing	Forward Yamaha	25	+1:06.121	17	
19	8	(Spain) Héctor Barberá	Avintia Racing	Avintia	25	+1:25.195	22	
20	84	(Italy) Michel Fabrizio	Octo IodaRacing Team	ART	25	+1:40.665	24	
Ret	63	(France) Mike Di Meglio	Avintia Racing	Avintia	17	Electronics	23	
Ret	35	(United Kingdom) Cal Crutchlow	Ducati Team	Ducati	10	Electronics	13	
Ret	19	(Spain) Álvaro Bautista	Go&Fun Honda Gresini	Honda	3	Electronics	12	
Ret	17	(Czech Republic) Karel Abraham	Cardion AB Motoracing	Honda	1	Accident	18	

=== Moto2 ===
Pos.	No.	Rider	Manufacturer	Laps	Time/Retired	Grid	Points
1	53	(Spain) Esteve Rabat	Kalex	23	41:23.197	1	25
2	40	(Spain) Maverick Viñales	Kalex	23	+4.244	3	20
3	5	(France) Johann Zarco	Caterham Suter	23	+11.157	8	16
4	36	(Finland) Mika Kallio	Kalex	23	+11.301	2	13
5	12	(Switzerland) Thomas Lüthi	Suter	23	+11.424	7	11
6	54	(Italy) Mattia Pasini	Kalex	23	+16.761	6	10
7	88	(Spain) Ricard Cardús	Tech 3	23	+21.275	20	9
8	49	(Spain) Axel Pons	Kalex	23	+32.793	22	8
9	23	(Germany) Marcel Schrötter	Tech 3	23	+32.932	17	7
10	95	(Australia) Anthony West	Speed Up	23	+32.960	27	6
11	7	(Italy) Lorenzo Baldassarri	Suter	23	+33.076	24	5
12	60	(Spain) Julián Simón	Kalex	23	+33.369	18	4
13	30	(Japan) Takaaki Nakagami	Kalex	23	+36.190	25	3
14	77	(Switzerland) Dominique Aegerter	Suter	23	+40.703	10	2
15	96	(France) Louis Rossi	Kalex	23	+40.904	26	1
16	2	(United States) Josh Herrin	Caterham Suter	23	+47.541	29	
17	97	(Spain) Román Ramos	Speed Up	23	+47.593	32	
18	70	(Switzerland) Robin Mulhauser	Suter	23	+47.644	30	
19	25	(Malaysia) Azlan Shah	Kalex	23	+54.002	33	
20	18	(Spain) Nicolás Terol	Suter	23	+59.057	23	
21	21	(Italy) Franco Morbidelli	Kalex	23	+1:07.827	12	
22	8	(United Kingdom) Gino Rea	Suter	23	+1:11.853	28	
23	45	(Japan) Tetsuta Nagashima	TSR	23	+1:22.101	31	
24	10	(Thailand) Thitipong Warokorn	Kalex	23	+1:25.699	34	
25	4	(Switzerland) Randy Krummenacher	Suter	23	+1:26.978	19	
Ret	15	(San Marino) Alex de Angelis	Suter	19	Accident	13	
Ret	19	(Belgium) Xavier Siméon	Suter	17	Accident	21	
Ret	81	(Spain) Jordi Torres	Suter	16	Accident	16	
Ret	39	(Spain) Luis Salom	Kalex	2	Accident	11	
Ret	94	(Germany) Jonas Folger	Kalex	2	Accident	5	
Ret	11	(Germany) Sandro Cortese	Kalex	1	Accident	4	
Ret	55	(Malaysia) Hafizh Syahrin	Kalex	1	Retirement	14	
Ret	22	(United Kingdom) Sam Lowes	Speed Up	0	Accident	9	
Ret	3	(Italy) Simone Corsi	Kalex	0	Accident	15	
OFFICIAL MOTO2 REPORT

=== Moto3 ===
Pos.	No.	Rider	Manufacturer	Laps	Time/Retired	Grid	Points
1	12	(Spain) Álex Márquez	Honda	22	41:11.656	1	25
2	33	(Italy) Enea Bastianini	KTM	22	+3.236	2	20
3	7	(Spain) Efrén Vázquez	Honda	22	+3.512	8	16
4	8	(Australia) Jack Miller	KTM	22	+3.764	9	13
5	5	(Italy) Romano Fenati	KTM	22	+3.862	16	11
6	41	(South Africa) Brad Binder	Mahindra	22	+4.048	4	10
7	32	(Spain) Isaac Viñales	KTM	22	+4.131	6	9
8	31	(Finland) Niklas Ajo	Husqvarna	22	+9.781	5	8
9	17	(United Kingdom) John McPhee	Honda	22	+18.578	10	7
10	21	(Italy) Francesco Bagnaia	KTM	22	+18.597	20	6
11	10	(France) Alexis Masbou	Honda	22	+18.982	17	5
12	44	(Portugal) Miguel Oliveira	Mahindra	22	+19.042	7	4
13	19	(Italy) Alessandro Tonucci	Mahindra	22	+19.328	14	3
14	98	(Czech Republic) Karel Hanika	KTM	22	+19.623	15	2
15	84	(Czech Republic) Jakub Kornfeil	KTM	22	+19.983	11	1
16	63	(Malaysia) Zulfahmi Khairuddin	Honda	22	+20.394	18	
17	52	(United Kingdom) Danny Kent	Husqvarna	22	+21.011	19	
18	61	(Australia) Arthur Sissis	Mahindra	22	+35.095	27	
19	65	(Germany) Philipp Öttl	Kalex KTM	22	+35.340	30	
20	43	(Germany) Luca Grünwald	Kalex KTM	22	+35.589	25	
21	3	(Italy) Matteo Ferrari	Mahindra	22	+35.702	22	
22	91	(Argentina) Gabriel Rodrigo	KTM	22	+36.232	34	
23	57	(Brazil) Eric Granado	KTM	22	+36.300	26	
24	51	(Netherlands) Bryan Schouten	Mahindra	22	+38.535	29	
25	11	(Belgium) Livio Loi	Kalex KTM	22	+38.536	23	
26	9	(Netherlands) Scott Deroue	Kalex KTM	22	+38.606	28	
27	95	(France) Jules Danilo	Mahindra	22	+42.593	32	
28	58	(Spain) Juan Francisco Guevara	Kalex KTM	22	+56.150	13	
29	55	(Italy) Andrea Locatelli	Mahindra	22	+56.210	31	
30	22	(Spain) Ana Carrasco	Kalex KTM	22	+1:01.152	35	
31	4	(Venezuela) Gabriel Ramos	Kalex KTM	22	+1:01.249	33	
Ret	42	(Spain) Álex Rins	Honda	4	Gear Lever	3	
Ret	38	(Malaysia) Hafiq Azmi	KTM	1	Accident	21	
Ret	6	(Spain) María Herrera	Honda	1	Accident	24	
Ret	23	(Italy) Niccolò Antonelli	KTM	0	Accident	12	
OFFICIAL MOTO3 REPORT

== Championship standings after the race (MotoGP) ==
Below are the standings for the top five riders and constructors after round seven has concluded.

Riders' Championship standings

Pos.	Rider	Points
1	(Spain) Marc Márquez	175
2	(Italy) Valentino Rossi	117
3	(Spain) Dani Pedrosa	112
4	(Spain) Jorge Lorenzo	78
5	(Italy) Andrea Dovizioso	71

Constructors' Championship standings

Pos.	Constructor	Points
1	(Japan) Honda	175
2	(Japan) Yamaha	127
3	(Italy) Ducati	74
4	(Switzerland) Forward Yamaha	54
5	(Italy) ART	2

- Note: Only the top five positions are included for both sets of standings.

Previous race: 2014 Italian Grand Prix	FIM Grand Prix World Championship; 2014 season	Next race: 2014 Dutch TT
Previous race: 2013 Catalan Grand Prix	Catalan motorcycle Grand Prix	Next race: 2015 Catalan Grand Prix
