= Matt Barton (motorcyclist) =

Australian motorcycle racer

- Nationality: Australian
- Born: 4 February 1996 (age 30); Geelong, Australia
- Current team: Phillip Island Circuit
- Bike number: 24
Motorcycle racing career statistics
Moto3 World Championship
| Active years | 2015–2016 |
| Manufacturers | FTR, FTR Honda |
| Championships | 0 |
| 2016 championship position | NC (0 pts) |
Starts / Wins / Podiums / Poles / F. laps / Points; 2 / 0 / 0 / 0 / 0 / 0

Matthew Barton (born 4 February 1996, in Geelong) is an Australian motorcycle racer. He has prevously competed in the Australian 125GP/Moto3 Championship aboard a FTR Honda.

== Career statistics ==
=== Grand Prix motorcycle racing ===
==== By season ====
| Season | Class | Motorcycle | Team | Race | Win | Podium | Pole | FLap | Pts | Plcd |
|---|---|---|---|---|---|---|---|---|---|---|
| 2015 | Moto3 | FTR | Suus Honda | 1 | 0 | 0 | 0 | 0 | 0 | NC |
| 2016 | Moto3 | FTR Honda | Suus Honda | 1 | 0 | 0 | 0 | 0 | 0 | NC |
| Total | | | | 2 | 0 | 0 | 0 | 0 | 0 | |

==== Races by year ====
| Yr | Class | Bike | 1 | 2 | 3 | 4 | 5 | 6 | 7 | 8 | 9 | 10 | 11 | 12 | 13 | 14 | 15 | 16 | 17 | 18 | Pos. | Pts |
|---|---|---|---|---|---|---|---|---|---|---|---|---|---|---|---|---|---|---|---|---|---|---|
| 2015 | Moto3 | FTR | QAT | AME | ARG | SPA | FRA | ITA | CAT | NED | GER | INP | CZE | GBR | RSM | ARA | JPN | AUS; Ret | MAL | VAL | NC | 0 |
| 2016 | Moto3 | FTR Honda | QAT | ARG | AME | SPA | FRA | ITA | CAT | NED | GER | AUT | CZE | GBR | RSM | ARA | JPN | AUS; 20 | MAL | VAL | NC | 0 |
