= Anthony Groppi =

Italian motorcycle racer (born 1997)

- Nationality: Italian
- Born: 4 July 1997 (age 29); Soave, Italy
- Current team: TM Racing Factory 3570MTA
- Bike number: 4
Motorcycle racing career statistics
Moto3 World Championship
| Active years | 2014–2015 |
| Manufacturers | FTR Honda |
| Championships | 0 |
| 2015 championship position | NC (0 pts) |
Starts / Wins / Podiums / Poles / F. laps / Points; 2 / 0 / 0 / 0 / 0 / 0

Anthony Groppi (born 4 July 1997 in Soave) is an Italian motorcycle racer. He competes in the CIV Moto3 Championship aboard a TM. In 2022 FIM Endurance World Championship, he rode for Italian-based Team Aviobike in superstock category.

== Career statistics ==
=== FIM CEV Moto3 Junior World Championship ===
==== Races by year ====
(key) (Races in bold indicate pole position, races in italics indicate fastest lap)

| Year | Bike | 1 | 2 | 3 | 4 | 5 | 6 | 7 | 8 | 9 | 10 | 11 | 12 | Pos | Pts |
|---|---|---|---|---|---|---|---|---|---|---|---|---|---|---|---|
| 2014 | KTM | JER1 | JER2 | LMS | ARA | CAT1 | CAT2 | ALB | NAV | ALG | VAL1; 21 | VAL2; 20 | | NC | 0 |
| 2016 | KTM | VAL1 | VAL2 | LMS | ARA | CAT1 | CAT2 | ALB | ALG | JER1 | JER2 | VAL1; 25 | VAL2; 29 | NC | 0 |
| 2018 | TM | EST; 22 | VAL1; 30 | VAL2; 31 | FRA; 39 | CAT1 | CAT2 | ARA | JER1 | JER2 | ALB | VAL1 | VAL2 | NC | 0 |

=== Grand Prix motorcycle racing ===
==== By season ====
| Season | Class | Motorcycle | Team | Race | Win | Podium | Pole | FLap | Pts | Plcd |
|---|---|---|---|---|---|---|---|---|---|---|
| 2014 | Moto3 | FTR Honda | Pos Corse | 1 | 0 | 0 | 0 | 0 | 0 | NC |
| 2015 | Moto3 | FTR Honda | Pos Corse | 1 | 0 | 0 | 0 | 0 | 0 | NC |
| Total | | | | **2** | **0** | **0** | **0** | **0** | **0** | |

==== Races by year ====
| Year | Class | Bike | 1 | 2 | 3 | 4 | 5 | 6 | 7 | 8 | 9 | 10 | 11 | 12 | 13 | 14 | 15 | 16 | 17 | 18 | Pos. | Pts |
|---|---|---|---|---|---|---|---|---|---|---|---|---|---|---|---|---|---|---|---|---|---|---|
| 2014 | Moto3 | FTR Honda | QAT | AME | ARG | SPA | FRA | ITA; 25 | CAT | NED | GER | INP | CZE | GBR | RSM | ARA | JPN | AUS | MAL | VAL | NC | 0 |
| 2015 | Moto3 | FTR Honda | QAT | AME | ARG | SPA | FRA | ITA; 27 | CAT | NED | GER | INP | CZE | GBR | RSM | ARA | JPN | AUS | MAL | VAL | NC | 0 |
