= 2015 Moto3 World Championship =

4th running of the Moto3 World Championship

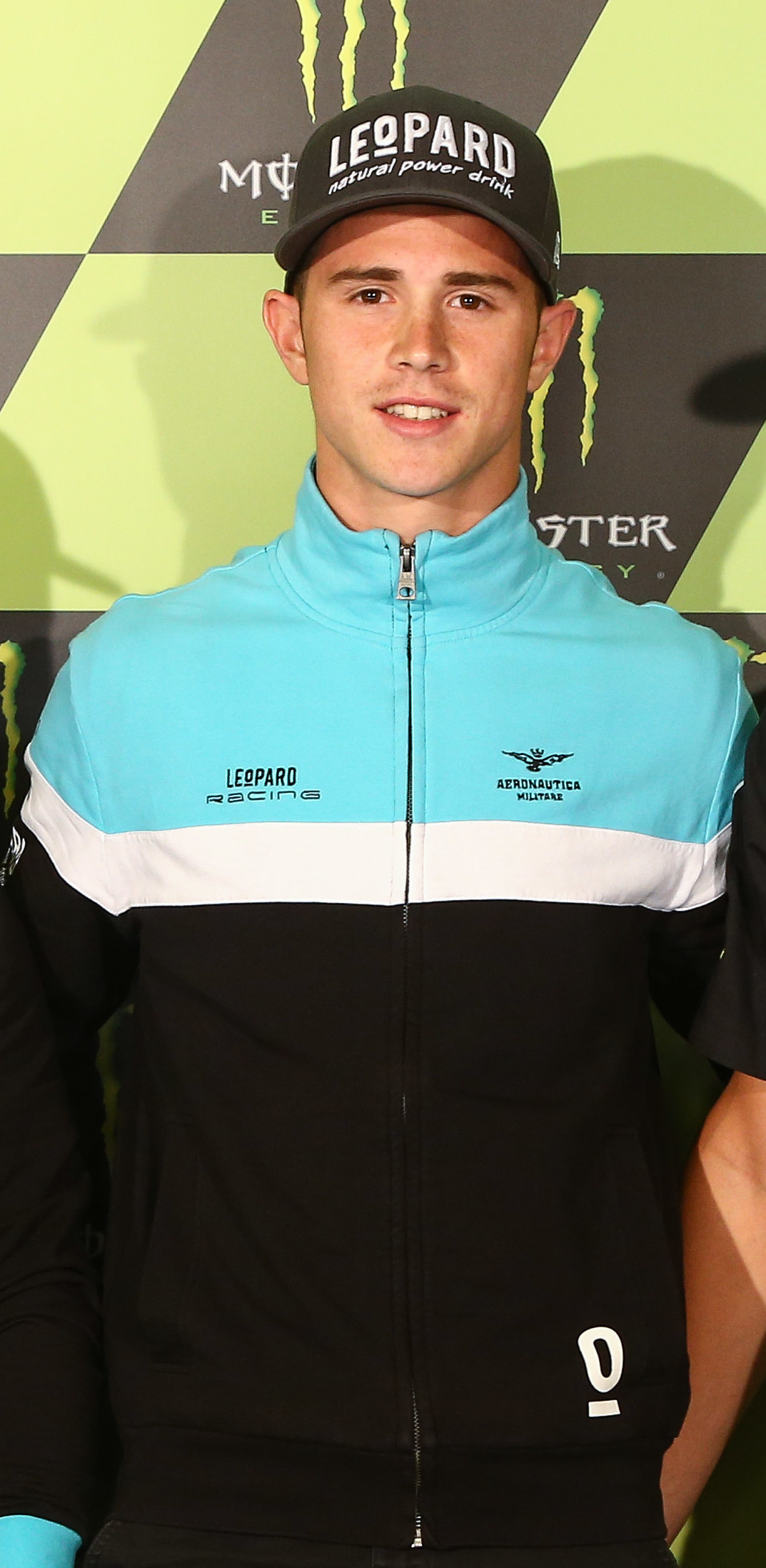
Danny Kent was the 2015 Moto3 World Riders' Champion.

The 2015 FIM Moto3 World Championship was the lightweight class of the 67th Fédération Internationale de Motocyclisme (FIM) Road Racing World Championship season. Álex Márquez was the reigning series champion but he did not defend his title as he joined the series' intermediate class, Moto2. Danny Kent became Great Britain's first Grand Prix motorcycle world champion since Barry Sheene in 1977, by winning the championship at the final race of the season in Valencia. Leopard Racing rider Kent started the season with wins at three of the first four races and his lowest finish in the first half of the season was fourth, leading the championship by 66 points at the mid-season break. He only visited the podium once in the second half of the season – a victory at Silverstone – as Enea Bastianini (Gresini Racing) and latterly, Miguel Oliveira (Ajo Motorsport) started to cut into his advantage. Oliveira trailed Kent by 110 points with 6 races remaining, but finished with 4 wins and 2 seconds in those races, and took the championship race to the final event as he became the closest challenger to Kent. Ultimately, Kent's ninth-place finish in Valencia gave him the championship by six points over Oliveira; both riders finished with six wins each, as Oliveira became Portugal's first motorcycle Grand Prix race-winner. Bastianini finished third in the championship, fifty-three points behind Kent; he won one race during the season, at Misano.

Romano Fenati was the race-winner at Le Mans for Sky Racing Team VR46, and Niccolò Antonelli won two races for Ongetta–Rivacold at Brno, and Motegi. The duo battled for fourth in the championship, which was settled in Fenati's favour after Antonelli took Fenati, Efrén Vázquez and himself out of the final race at Valencia. The season's other winners were Alexis Masbou, who won the season-opening race in Qatar for SaxoPrint–RTG, and Livio Loi, who won by nearly 40 seconds at Indianapolis in a wet-to-dry race for RW Racing GP. The top rookie rider was Jorge Navarro for Estrella Galicia 0,0 in seventh place in the final championship standings; he finished with four podium finishes in the final five races. The manufacturers' standings were headed by Honda for the first time in the lightweight class since 2001, with at least one motorcycle from the company finishing on the podium – including eleven wins – at every race during the season. Honda finished 70 points clear of KTM, who won the remaining 7 races.

2015 was the last season that Eni was the sole fuel supplier for Moto3, as Total became the new fuel supplier for 2016.

== Calendar ==
The Fédération Internationale de Motocyclisme released an 18-race official calendar on 26 September 2014.

Round	Date	Grand Prix	Circuit
1	29 March ‡	Commercial Bank Grand Prix of Qatar	Lusail International Circuit, Lusail
2	12 April	(United States) Red Bull Grand Prix of the Americas	Circuit of the Americas, Austin
3	19 April	Gran Premio Red Bull de la República Argentina	Autódromo Termas de Río Hondo, Termas de Río Hondo
4	3 May	(Spain) Gran Premio bwin de España	Circuito de Jerez, Jerez de la Frontera
5	17 May	Monster Energy Grand Prix de France	Bugatti Circuit, Le Mans
6	31 May	(Italy) Gran Premio d'Italia TIM	Mugello Circuit, Scarperia e San Piero
7	14 June	(Catalonia) Gran Premi Monster Energy de Catalunya	Circuit de Barcelona-Catalunya, Montmeló
8	27 June ††	(Netherlands) Motul TT Assen	TT Circuit Assen, Assen
9	12 July	(Germany) GoPro Motorrad Grand Prix Deutschland	Sachsenring, Hohenstein-Ernstthal
10	9 August	Red Bull Indianapolis Grand Prix	Indianapolis Motor Speedway, Speedway
11	16 August	(Czech Republic) bwin Grand Prix České republiky	Brno Circuit, Brno
12	30 August	(United Kingdom) Octo British Grand Prix	Silverstone Circuit, Silverstone
13	13 September	Gran Premio TIM di San Marino e della Riviera di Rimini	Misano World Circuit, Misano Adriatico
14	27 September	(Aragon) Gran Premio Movistar de Aragón	MotorLand Aragón, Alcañiz
15	11 October	Motul Grand Prix of Japan	Motegi Circuit, Motegi
16	18 October	(Australia) Pramac Australian Motorcycle Grand Prix	Phillip Island Grand Prix Circuit, Phillip Island
17	25 October	Shell Malaysia Motorcycle Grand Prix	Sepang International Circuit, Sepang
18	8 November	(Valencian Community) Gran Premio Motul de la Comunitat Valenciana	Circuit Ricardo Tormo, Valencia

‡ = Night race
†† = Saturday race

=== Calendar changes ===
- The British Grand Prix had been scheduled to return to Donington Park for the first time since 2009, ahead of a planned move to the brand-new Circuit of Wales in 2016. However, Donington Park pulled out of hosting the event on 10 February 2015, citing financial delays. The following day, it was announced that Silverstone would host the British Grand Prix in 2015 and 2016.

== Teams and riders ==
Starting in 2015, the rolling chassis must be homologated and supplied by the engine manufacturers participating in the Moto3 class. Each manufacturer was permitted to homologate only one version of its own chassis and one version of any third-party supplied chassis they made available. Each component designated as a performance part – relating to the chassis, swingarm, fuel tank, seat, bodywork and suspensions – could be updated a maximum of once per season and had to be available to all customers of that manufacturer at the same time.

A provisional entry list was released by the Fédération Internationale de Motocyclisme on 23 October 2014. An updated entry list was released on 2 February 2015. All teams used Dunlop tyres.

Team	Constructor	Motorcycle	No.	Rider	Rounds
(France) CIP	Mahindra	Mahindra MGP3O	2	(Australia) Remy Gardner	All
(France) CIP	Mahindra	Mahindra MGP3O	24	(Japan) Tatsuki Suzuki	All
(Italy) Gresini Racing Team Moto3	Honda	Honda NSF250RW	4	(Italy) Fabio Di Giannantonio	18
(Italy) Gresini Racing Team Moto3	Honda	Honda NSF250RW	33	(Italy) Enea Bastianini	All
(Italy) Gresini Racing Team Moto3	Honda	Honda NSF250RW	55	(Italy) Andrea Locatelli	1–17
(Italy) Sky Racing Team VR46	KTM	KTM RC250GP	5	(Italy) Romano Fenati	All
(Italy) Sky Racing Team VR46	KTM	KTM RC250GP	8	(Italy) Nicolò Bulega	18
(Italy) Sky Racing Team VR46	KTM	KTM RC250GP	16	(Italy) Andrea Migno	All
(Spain) Husqvarna Factory Laglisse	Husqvarna	Husqvarna FR250GP	6	(Spain) María Herrera	All
(Spain) Husqvarna Factory Laglisse	Husqvarna	Husqvarna FR250GP	32	(Spain) Isaac Viñales	1–9
(Spain) Husqvarna Factory Laglisse	Husqvarna	Husqvarna FR250GP	37	(Italy) Davide Pizzoli	14
(Spain) Husqvarna Factory Laglisse	Husqvarna	Husqvarna FR250GP	48	(Italy) Lorenzo Dalla Porta	10–18
(Luxembourg) Leopard Racing	Honda	Honda NSF250RW	7	(Spain) Efrén Vázquez	All
(Luxembourg) Leopard Racing	Honda	Honda NSF250RW	36	(Spain) Joan Mir	16
(Luxembourg) Leopard Racing	Honda	Honda NSF250RW	52	(United Kingdom) Danny Kent	All
(Luxembourg) Leopard Racing	Honda	Honda NSF250RW	76	(Japan) Hiroki Ono	1–15, 17–18
(Spain) Estrella Galicia 0,0	Honda	Honda NSF250RW	09	(Spain) Jorge Navarro	All
(Spain) Estrella Galicia 0,0	Honda	Honda NSF250RW	20	(France) Fabio Quartararo	1–13, 15–16, 18
(Spain) Estrella Galicia 0,0	Honda	Honda NSF250RW	81	(Japan) Sena Yamada	14
(Germany) SaxoPrint–RTG	Honda	Honda NSF250RW	10	(France) Alexis Masbou	All
(Germany) SaxoPrint–RTG	Honda	Honda NSF250RW	17	(United Kingdom) John McPhee	All
(Germany) SaxoPrint–RTG	FTR Honda	FTR M315	97	(Germany) Maximilian Kappler	9, 11
(Netherlands) RW Racing GP	Honda	Honda NSF250RW	11	(Belgium) Livio Loi	All
(Italy) San Carlo Team Italia	Mahindra	Mahindra MGP3O	12	(Italy) Matteo Ferrari	1–13
(Italy) San Carlo Team Italia	Mahindra	Mahindra MGP3O	29	(Italy) Stefano Manzi	2–18
(Italy) San Carlo Team Italia	Mahindra	Mahindra MGP3O	53	(Italy) Marco Bezzecchi	1
(Italy) San Carlo Team Italia	Mahindra	Mahindra MGP3O	96	(Italy) Manuel Pagliani	14–18
(Australia) Suus Honda	FTR	FTR M315	14	(Australia) Matt Barton	16
(Italy) Outox Reset Drink Team	Mahindra	Mahindra MGP3O	19	(Italy) Alessandro Tonucci	All
(Italy) Outox Reset Drink Team	Mahindra	Mahindra MGP3O	40	(South Africa) Darryn Binder	All
(Spain) Mapfre Team Mahindra	Mahindra	Mahindra MGP3O	21	(Italy) Francesco Bagnaia	All
(Spain) Mapfre Team Mahindra	Mahindra	Mahindra MGP3O	58	(Spain) Juan Francisco Guevara	All
(Spain) Mapfre Team Mahindra	Mahindra	Mahindra MGP3O	88	(Spain) Jorge Martín	All
(Spain) RBA Racing Team	KTM	KTM RC250GP	22	(Spain) Ana Carrasco	2–9, 12–18
(Spain) RBA Racing Team	KTM	KTM RC250GP	31	(Finland) Niklas Ajo	1–11
(Spain) RBA Racing Team	KTM	KTM RC250GP	32	(Spain) Isaac Viñales	10–18
(Spain) RBA Racing Team	KTM	KTM RC250GP	61	(Belgium) Loris Cresson	1
(Spain) RBA Racing Team	KTM	KTM RC250GP	91	(Argentina) Gabriel Rodrigo	All
(Italy) Ongetta–Rivacold	Honda	Honda NSF250RW	23	(Italy) Niccolò Antonelli	All
(Italy) Ongetta–Rivacold	Honda	Honda NSF250RW	95	(France) Jules Danilo	All
(United Kingdom) FPW Racing	Kalex KTM	Kalex KTM Moto3	25	(Netherlands) Jorel Boerboom	8
(United Kingdom) FPW Racing	Kalex KTM	Kalex KTM Moto3	26	(United Kingdom) Luke Hedger	12
(Japan) Musahi RT Harc-Pro	Honda	Honda NSF250R	27	(Japan) Keisuke Kurihara	15
(Japan) Musahi RT Harc-Pro	Honda	Honda NSF250R	34	(Japan) Ryo Mizuno	15
(Australia) Olly Simpson Racing	KTM	KTM RC250GP	35	(Australia) Olly Simpson	16
(Finland) Red Bull KTM Ajo	KTM	KTM RC250GP	41	(South Africa) Brad Binder	All
(Finland) Red Bull KTM Ajo	KTM	KTM RC250GP	44	(Portugal) Miguel Oliveira	All
(Finland) Red Bull KTM Ajo	KTM	KTM RC250GP	98	(Czech Republic) Karel Hanika	All
(Germany) Freudenberg Racing Team	KTM	KTM RC250GP	45	(Germany) Jonas Geitner	9
(Malaysia) DRIVE M7 SIC	KTM	KTM RC250GP	63	(Malaysia) Zulfahmi Khairuddin	All
(Malaysia) DRIVE M7 SIC	KTM	KTM RC250GP	84	(Czech Republic) Jakub Kornfeil	All
(Germany) Schedl GP Racing	KTM	KTM RC250GP	65	(Germany) Philipp Öttl	All
(United Kingdom) RS Racing	KTM	KTM RC250GP	66	(United Kingdom) Taz Taylor	12
(Italy) Minimoto Portmaggiore	Mahindra	Mahindra MGP3O	72	(Italy) Marco Bezzecchi	6
(Italy) Pos Corse	FTR Honda	FTR M315	73	(Italy) Anthony Groppi	6
(Germany) Team Hanusch	Honda	Honda NSF250R	86	(Germany) Kevin Hanus	8, 11
(Japan) Honda Team Asia	Honda	Honda NSF250R	89	(Malaysia) Khairul Idham Pawi	14
(Italy) Turvital di Vitali Ordeo	TVR	TVR Moto3	90	(Hungary) Adrián Gyutai	13

Key
Regular rider
Wildcard rider
Replacement rider

== Results and standings ==
=== Grands Prix ===
Round	Grand Prix	Pole position	Fastest lap	Winning rider	Winning team	Winning constructor	Report
1	Qatar motorcycle Grand Prix	(France) Alexis Masbou	(Italy) Enea Bastianini	(France) Alexis Masbou	(Germany) SaxoPrint–RTG	(Japan) Honda	Report
2	(United States) Motorcycle Grand Prix of the Americas	(United Kingdom) Danny Kent	(Portugal) Miguel Oliveira	(United Kingdom) Danny Kent	(Luxembourg) Leopard Racing	(Japan) Honda	Report
3	(Argentina) Argentine Republic motorcycle Grand Prix	(Portugal) Miguel Oliveira	(Portugal) Miguel Oliveira	(United Kingdom) Danny Kent	(Luxembourg) Leopard Racing	(Japan) Honda	Report
4	(Spain) Spanish motorcycle Grand Prix	(France) Fabio Quartararo	(South Africa) Brad Binder	(United Kingdom) Danny Kent	(Luxembourg) Leopard Racing	(Japan) Honda	Report
5	(France) French motorcycle Grand Prix	(France) Fabio Quartararo	(Italy) Enea Bastianini	(Italy) Romano Fenati	(Italy) Sky Racing Team VR46	(Austria) KTM	Report
6	(Italy) Italian motorcycle Grand Prix	(United Kingdom) Danny Kent	(South Africa) Brad Binder	(Portugal) Miguel Oliveira	(Finland) Red Bull KTM Ajo	(Austria) KTM	Report
7	(Catalonia) Catalan motorcycle Grand Prix	(Italy) Enea Bastianini	(Spain) Efrén Vázquez	(United Kingdom) Danny Kent	(Luxembourg) Leopard Racing	(Japan) Honda	Report
8	(Netherlands) Dutch TT	(Italy) Enea Bastianini	(Spain) Jorge Navarro	(Portugal) Miguel Oliveira	(Finland) Red Bull KTM Ajo	(Austria) KTM	Report
9	(Germany) German motorcycle Grand Prix	(United Kingdom) Danny Kent	(United Kingdom) Danny Kent	(United Kingdom) Danny Kent	(Luxembourg) Leopard Racing	(Japan) Honda	Report
10	Indianapolis motorcycle Grand Prix	(United Kingdom) Danny Kent	(United Kingdom) Danny Kent	(Belgium) Livio Loi	(Netherlands) RW Racing GP	(Japan) Honda	Report
11	Czech Republic motorcycle Grand Prix	(Italy) Niccolò Antonelli	(Portugal) Miguel Oliveira	(Italy) Niccolò Antonelli	(Italy) Ongetta–Rivacold	(Japan) Honda	Report
12	(United Kingdom) British motorcycle Grand Prix	(Spain) Jorge Navarro	(United Kingdom) Danny Kent	(United Kingdom) Danny Kent	(Luxembourg) Leopard Racing	(Japan) Honda	Report
13	San Marino and Rimini Riviera motorcycle Grand Prix	(Italy) Enea Bastianini	(Italy) Niccolò Antonelli	(Italy) Enea Bastianini	(Italy) Gresini Racing Team Moto3	(Japan) Honda	Report
14	Aragon motorcycle Grand Prix	(Italy) Enea Bastianini	(Italy) Niccolò Antonelli	(Portugal) Miguel Oliveira	(Finland) Red Bull KTM Ajo	(Austria) KTM	Report
15	(Japan) Japanese motorcycle Grand Prix	(Italy) Romano Fenati	(Spain) Isaac Viñales	(Italy) Niccolò Antonelli	(Italy) Ongetta–Rivacold	(Japan) Honda	Report
16	(Australia) Australian motorcycle Grand Prix	(United Kingdom) Danny Kent (Note: Danny Kent, who set the fastest time in qualifying, was given a 6-place grid penalty for a riding infringement during free practice. John McPhee started the race from pole position, although Kent was still credited with pole position.)	(Italy) Francesco Bagnaia	(Portugal) Miguel Oliveira	(Finland) Red Bull KTM Ajo	(Austria) KTM	Report
17	(Malaysia) Malaysian motorcycle Grand Prix	(Italy) Niccolò Antonelli	(South Africa) Brad Binder	(Portugal) Miguel Oliveira	(Finland) Red Bull KTM Ajo	(Austria) KTM	Report
18	Valencian Community motorcycle Grand Prix	(United Kingdom) John McPhee	(Italy) Romano Fenati	(Portugal) Miguel Oliveira	(Finland) Red Bull KTM Ajo	(Austria) KTM	Report

=== Riders' standings ===
Scoring system

Points were awarded to the top fifteen finishers. A rider had to finish the race to earn points.

Position	**1st**	**2nd**	**3rd**	**4th**	**5th**	**6th**	**7th**	**8th**	**9th**	**10th**	**11th**	**12th**	**13th**	**14th**	**15th**
Points	25	20	16	13	11	10	9	8	7	6	5	4	3	2	1

Pos	Rider	Bike	QAT (Qatar)	AME (United States)	ARG (Argentina)	SPA (Spain)	FRA (France)	ITA (Italy)	CAT (Catalonia)	NED (Netherlands)	GER (Germany)	INP (Indianapolis)	CZE (Czech Republic)	GBR (United Kingdom)	RSM (San Marino)	ARA (Aragon)	JPN (Japan)	AUS (Australia)	MAL (Malaysia)	VAL (Valencian Community)	Pts
1	(United Kingdom) Danny Kent	Honda	3	**1**	1	1	4	**2**	1	3	**1**	**21**	7	1	6	Ret	6	**Ret**	7	9	260
2	(Portugal) Miguel Oliveira	KTM	16	Ret	**4**	2	8	1	5	1	DNS	15	8	13	2	1	2	1	1	1	254
3	(Italy) Enea Bastianini	Honda	2	4	9	9	2	5	**2**	**6**	3	6	2	Ret	**1**	**Ret**	7	Ret	8	5	207
4	(Italy) Romano Fenati	KTM	Ret	8	8	6	1	3	8	5	4	4	6	12	4	3	**28**	6	5	Ret	176
5	(Italy) Niccolò Antonelli	Honda	8	23	Ret	Ret	5	6	4	9	5	7	**1**	3	3	6	1	17	**4**	Ret	174
6	(South Africa) Brad Binder	KTM	10	5	5	3	Ret	10	9	7	7	8	3	Ret	5	Ret	17	3	2	4	159
7	(Spain) Jorge Navarro	Honda	12	Ret	Ret	8	Ret	7	6	4	6	9	5	**Ret**	DNS	2	3	4	3	2	157
8	(Spain) Efrén Vázquez	Honda	4	3	2	5	Ret	Ret	3	Ret	2	Ret	4	9	Ret	4	10	2	Ret	Ret	155
9	(Spain) Isaac Viñales	Husqvarna	6	9	3	11	7	8	7	Ret	18										115
9	(Spain) Isaac Viñales	KTM										5	Ret	Ret	9	Ret	4	8	14	6	115
10	(France) Fabio Quartararo	Honda	7	2	6	**4**	**Ret**	Ret	14	2	Ret	11	Ret	4	DNS		DNS	DNS		Ret	92
11	(United Kingdom) John McPhee	Honda	5	6	15	10	17	20	Ret	10	17	2	10	6	19	17	9	Ret	10	**7**	92
12	(Czech Republic) Jakub Kornfeil	KTM	17	11	14	Ret	6	16	Ret	20	14	22	9	2	17	14	12	5	6	3	89
13	(France) Alexis Masbou	Honda	**1**	16	Ret	15	Ret	9	18	Ret	8	32	Ret	11	7	8	Ret	9	9	15	78
14	(Italy) Francesco Bagnaia	Mahindra	9	Ret	11	7	3	4	20	11	Ret	Ret	12	Ret	8	11	15	Ret	17	13	76
15	(Germany) Philipp Öttl	KTM	14	13	16	Ret	10	22	10	15	11	3	15	16	10	5	23	7	15	10	73
16	(Belgium) Livio Loi	Honda	Ret	25	12	13	13	14	19	13	16	1	18	5	12	15	Ret	Ret	19	20	56
17	(Spain) Jorge Martín	Mahindra	15	Ret	22	14	Ret	17	11	18	12	10	11	Ret	15	7	11	15	12	14	45
18	(Czech Republic) Karel Hanika	KTM	13	10	7	22	20	28	Ret	8	13	12	26	Ret	21	Ret	8	14	Ret	Ret	43
19	(Italy) Andrea Migno	KTM	24	12	17	21	9	15	28	12	21	20	13	15	13	9	20	Ret	24	11	35
20	(Italy) Andrea Locatelli	Honda	11	7	23	16	16	13	12	Ret	9	13	Ret	Ret	DNS	DNS	14	Ret	DNS		33
21	(Japan) Hiroki Ono	Honda	Ret	Ret	13	Ret	11	11	Ret	14	Ret	26	Ret	20	16	10	Ret		Ret	8	29
22	(Finland) Niklas Ajo	KTM	Ret	14	10	17	Ret	12	13	17	10	30	Ret								21
23	(Malaysia) Zulfahmi Khairuddin	KTM	28	20	20	26	14	26	24	Ret	19	25	22	14	Ret	Ret	5	12	Ret	17	19
24	(Spain) Juan Francisco Guevara	Mahindra	18	Ret	Ret	20	12	Ret	26	Ret	DNS	18	14	7	Ret	21	21	Ret	20	Ret	15
25	(Italy) Lorenzo Dalla Porta	Husqvarna										28	19	8	11	24	24	Ret	16	22	13
26	(France) Jules Danilo	Honda	20	Ret	Ret	12	Ret	Ret	16	16	15	14	27	Ret	Ret	22	19	Ret	11	16	12
27	(Italy) Stefano Manzi	Mahindra		24	18	19	15	Ret	27	22	22	19	24	Ret	14	12	18	Ret	13	19	10
28	(Japan) Tatsuki Suzuki	Mahindra	23	Ret	27	23	Ret	Ret	22	Ret	Ret	23	20	10	Ret	16	13	Ret	21	Ret	9
29	(Spain) María Herrera	Husqvarna	22	17	Ret	Ret	19	21	15	Ret	Ret	24	23	Ret	24	13	26	11	18	21	9
30	(Australia) Remy Gardner	Mahindra	Ret	18	19	25	Ret	23	25	26	23	17	17	17	Ret	19	Ret	10	22	Ret	6
31	(Italy) Nicolò Bulega	KTM																		12	4
32	(Italy) Manuel Pagliani	Mahindra														Ret	22	13	Ret	25	3
33	(Italy) Matteo Ferrari	Mahindra	21	15	21	18	Ret	24	21	24	25	29	21	Ret	23						1
	(Italy) Alessandro Tonucci	Mahindra	25	21	25	Ret	Ret	19	17	21	24	16	25	Ret	22	23	Ret	16	DNS	Ret	0
	(South Africa) Darryn Binder	Mahindra	19	Ret	24	24	Ret	18	Ret	19	20	27	16	Ret	18	Ret	27	Ret	Ret	18	0
	(Argentina) Gabriel Rodrigo	KTM	27	19	28	Ret	Ret	Ret	Ret	25	26	31	Ret	Ret	20	20	16	Ret	25	DNS	0
	(Spain) Ana Carrasco	KTM		22	26	27	18	25	23	23	Ret			Ret	25	27	29	18	23	24	0
	(Japan) Sena Yamada	Honda														18					0
	(United Kingdom) Luke Hedger	Kalex KTM												18							0
	(Australia) Olly Simpson	KTM																19			0
	(United Kingdom) Taz Taylor	KTM												19							0
	(Italy) Fabio Di Giannantonio	Honda																		23	0
	(Japan) Keisuke Kurihara	Honda															25				0
	(Malaysia) Khairul Idham Pawi	Honda														25					0
	(Italy) Marco Bezzecchi	Mahindra	26					Ret													0
	(Italy) Davide Pizzoli	Husqvarna														26					0
	(Hungary) Adrián Gyutai	TVR													26						0
	(Germany) Jonas Geitner	KTM									27										0
	(Netherlands) Jorel Boerboom	Kalex KTM								27											0
	(Italy) Anthony Groppi	FTR Honda						27													0
	(Germany) Kevin Hanus	Honda								28			Ret								0
	(Belgium) Loris Cresson	KTM	29																		0
	(Germany) Maximilian Kappler	FTR Honda									Ret		Ret								0
	(Australia) Matt Barton	FTR																Ret			0
	(Spain) Joan Mir	Honda																Ret			0
	(Japan) Ryo Mizuno	Honda															Ret				0
Pos	Rider	Bike	QAT (Qatar)	AME (United States)	ARG (Argentina)	SPA (Spain)	FRA (France)	ITA (Italy)	CAT (Catalonia)	NED (Netherlands)	GER (Germany)	INP (Indianapolis)	CZE (Czech Republic)	GBR (United Kingdom)	RSM (San Marino)	ARA (Aragon)	JPN (Japan)	AUS (Australia)	MAL (Malaysia)	VAL (Valencian Community)	Pts

Colour	Result
Gold	Winner
Silver	Second place
Bronze	Third place
Green	Points classification
Blue	Non-points classification
Blue	Non-classified finish (NC)
Purple	Retired, not classified (Ret)
Red	Did not qualify (DNQ)
Red	Did not pre-qualify (DNPQ)
Black	Disqualified (DSQ)
White	Did not start (DNS)
White	Withdrew (WD)
White	Race cancelled (C)
Blank	Did not practice (DNP)
Blank	Did not arrive (DNA)
Blank	Excluded (EX)

**Bold** – Pole
Italics – Fastest Lap
Light blue – Rookie

=== Constructors' standings ===
Each constructor received the same number of points as their best placed rider in each race.

Pos	Constructor	QAT (Qatar)	AME (United States)	ARG (Argentina)	SPA (Spain)	FRA (France)	ITA (Italy)	CAT (Catalonia)	NED (Netherlands)	GER (Germany)	INP (Indianapolis)	CZE (Czech Republic)	GBR (United Kingdom)	RSM (San Marino)	ARA (Aragon)	JPN (Japan)	AUS (Australia)	MAL (Malaysia)	VAL (Valencian Community)	Pts
1	(Japan) Honda	1	1	1	1	2	2	1	2	1	1	1	1	1	2	1	2	3	2	411
2	(Austria) KTM	10	5	4	2	1	1	5	1	4	3	3	2	2	1	2	1	1	1	341
3	(India) Mahindra	9	15	11	7	3	4	11	11	12	10	11	7	8	7	11	10	12	13	120
4	(Sweden) Husqvarna	6	9	3	11	7	8	7	Ret	18	24	19	8	11	13	24	11	16	21	85
	(Germany) Kalex KTM								27				18							0
	(Italy) TVR													26						0
	(United Kingdom) FTR Honda						27			Ret		Ret								0
	(United Kingdom) FTR																Ret			0
Pos	Constructor	QAT (Qatar)	AME (United States)	ARG (Argentina)	SPA (Spain)	FRA (France)	ITA (Italy)	CAT (Catalonia)	NED (Netherlands)	GER (Germany)	INP (Indianapolis)	CZE (Czech Republic)	GBR (United Kingdom)	RSM (San Marino)	ARA (Aragon)	JPN (Japan)	AUS (Australia)	MAL (Malaysia)	VAL (Valencian Community)	Pts
