= Keisuke Kurihara (motorcyclist) =

Japanese motorcycle racer

- Nationality: Japanese
- Born: 13 December 1997 (age 28); Tokyo, Japan
- Current team: AP Honda Racing Thailand
- Bike number: 88
Motorcycle racing career statistics
Moto3 World Championship
Active years	2015
Manufacturers	Honda
Championships	0
2015 championship position	NC (0 pts)
Starts / Wins / Podiums / Poles / F. laps / Points; 1 / 0 / 0 / 0 / 0 / 0

Keisuke Kurihara (栗原 佳祐, Kurihara Keisuke; born 13 December 1997) is a Japanese motorcycle racer. He races in the Asia Road Race SS600 Championship, aboard a Honda CBR600RR.

== Career statistics ==
=== FIM CEV Moto3 Junior World Championship ===
==== Races by year ====
(key) (Races in bold indicate pole position, races in italics indicate fastest lap)

Year	Bike	1	2	3	4	5	6	7	8	9	10	11	12	Pos	Pts
2016	Honda	VAL1	VAL2	LMS	ARA	CAT1	CAT2	ALB	ALG	JER1	JER2	VAL1; 23	VAL2; 20	NC	0

=== Grand Prix motorcycle racing ===
==== By season ====
Season	Class	Motorcycle	Team	Race	Win	Podium	Pole	FLap	Pts	Plcd
2015	Moto3	Honda	Musashi RT Harc-Pro	1	0	0	0	0	0	NC
Total				**1**	**0**	**0**	**0**	**0**	**0**	

==== Races by year ====
Year	Class	Bike	1	2	3	4	5	6	7	8	9	10	11	12	13	14	15	16	17	18	Pos.	Pts
2015	Moto3	Honda	QAT	AME	ARG	SPA	FRA	ITA	CAT	NED	GER	IND	CZE	GBR	RSM	ARA	JPN; 25	AUS	MAL	VAL	NC	0
