= List of Grand Prix motorcycle racers: G =

The List of Grand Prix motorcycle racers provides a comprehensive overview of notable riders who have competed in the FIM (Fédération Internationale de Motocyclisme) sanctioned Grand Prix motorcycle racing series. This list includes racers across various classes and eras, from the inaugural season in 1949 to the modern MotoGP era, showcasing athletes who have left a mark in the sport through championship victories, record-breaking performances, or memorable careers.

== Criteria for inclusion ==
Racers included in this list have participated in at least one official FIM Grand Prix motorcycle race. Many have distinguished themselves with notable achievements, such as multiple podium finishes, race victories, or championship titles.

Name	Seasons	World Championships	MotoGP Wins	500cc Wins	350cc Wins	Moto2 Wins	250cc Wins	Moto3 Wins	125cc Wins	80cc Wins	50cc Wins	MotoE Wins
(Spain) Sergio Gadea	2003-2011	0	0	0	0	0	0	0	3	0	0	0
(Italy) Roberto Gallina	1968, 1970-1976	0	0	0	0	0	0	0	0	0	0	0
(Spain) José Julián García	2019-2020	0	0	0	0	0	0	0	0	0	0	0
(Spain) Roberto García	2024	0	0	0	0	0	0	0	0	0	0	0
(Spain) Sergio García	2019-	0	0	0	0	2	0	7	0	0	0	0
(Australia) Remy Gardner	2014-2022, 2024	1 Moto2 - 2021	0	0	0	6	0	0	0	0	0	0
(Australia) Wayne Gardner	1983-1992	1 500cc - 1987	0	18	0	0	0	0	0	0	0	0
(Spain) Juan Garriga	1984-1993	0	0	0	0	0	3	0	0	0	0	0
(Spain) Héctor Garzó	2017-2025	1 MotoE - 2024	0	0	0	0	0	0	0	0	0	5
(Germany) Tim Georgi	2016-2017	0	0	0	0	0	0	0	0	0	0	0
(Germany) Dirk Geiger	2019-2020	0	0	0	0	0	0	0	0	0	0	0
(United Kingdom) Alex George	1970-1971, 1973-1981	0	0	0	0	0	0	0	0	0	0	0
(United States) Garrett Gerloff	2021	0	0	0	0	0	0	0	0	0	0	0
(Italy) Ezio Gianola	1983-1993	0	0	0	0	0	0	0	9	0	0	0
(Spain) Sete Gibernau	1992-2006, 2009, 2019	0	8	1	0	0	0	0	0	0	0	0
(France) Sébastien Gimbert	1996-2001	0	0	0	0	0	0	0	0	0	0	0
(Australia) Anthony Gobert	1997, 1999-2000	0	0	0	0	0	0	0	0	0	0	0
(Australia) Peter Goddard	1990-1997	0	0	0	0	0	0	0	0	0	0	0
(Spain) Manuel González	2021-	0	0	0	0	10	0	0	0	0	0	0
(Netherlands) Jurgen van den Goorbergh	1991-2002, 2005	0	0	0	0	0	0	0	0	0	0	0
(Netherlands) Zonta van den Goorbergh	2022-	0	0	0	0	0	0	0	0	0	0	0
(United Kingdom) Rodney Gould	1967-1972	1 250cc - 1970	0	0	0	0	10	0	0	0	0	0
(Spain) Borja Gómez	2022-2023	0	0	0	0	0	0	0	0	0	0	0
(United Kingdom) Leslie Graham	1949-1953	1 500cc - 1949	0	5	2	0	0	0	1	0	0	0
(United Kingdom) Stuart Graham	1962, 1966-1967	0	0	0	0	0	0	0	1	0	1	0
(Italy) Alessandro Gramigni	1990-1995, 1997	1 125cc - 1992	0	0	0	0	0	0	3	0	0	0
(Brazil) Eric Granado	2012-2014, 2017-2025	0	0	0	0	0	0	0	0	0	0	13
(Sweden) Bo Granath	1961-1979	0	0	0	0	0	0	0	0	0	0	0
(United Kingdom) Mick Grant	1970-1984	0	0	1	0	0	2	0	0	0	0	0
(Italy) Silvio Grassetti	1961-1963, 1965-1973	0	0	0	1	0	2	0	0	0	0	0
(Spain) Benjamin Grau	1967, 1970-1972, 1974-1975	0	0	0	0	0	0	0	1	0	0	0
(Italy) Fausto Gresini	1983-1994	2 125cc - 1985, 1987	0	0	0	0	0	0	21	0	0	0
(Germany) Luca Grünwald	2011-2014, 2018	0	0	0	0	0	0	0	0	0	0	0
(Italy) Anthony Groppi	1961-1963, 1965-1973	0	0	0	0	0	0	0	0	0	0	0
(Italy) Simone Grotzkyj	2005-2012	0	0	0	0	0	0	0	0	0	0	0
(Spain) Izan Guevara	2021-	1 Moto3 - 2022	0	0	0	5	0	8	0	0	0	0
(Spain) Juan Francisco Guevara	2011-2017	0	0	0	0	0	0	0	0	0	0	0
(France) Hervé Guilleux	1979, 1981, 1983-1984, 1987	0	0	0	0	0	1	0	0	0	0	0
(France) Sylvain Guintoli	2000-2008, 2011, 2017-2019	0	0	0	0	0	0	0	0	0	0	0
(Spain) Óscar Gutiérrez	2023-2025	0	0	0	0	0	0	0	0	0	0	5
(Hungary) Adrián Gyutai	2015	0	0	0	0	0	0	0	0	0	0	0
