= Adrián Gyutai =

Hungarian motorcycle racer

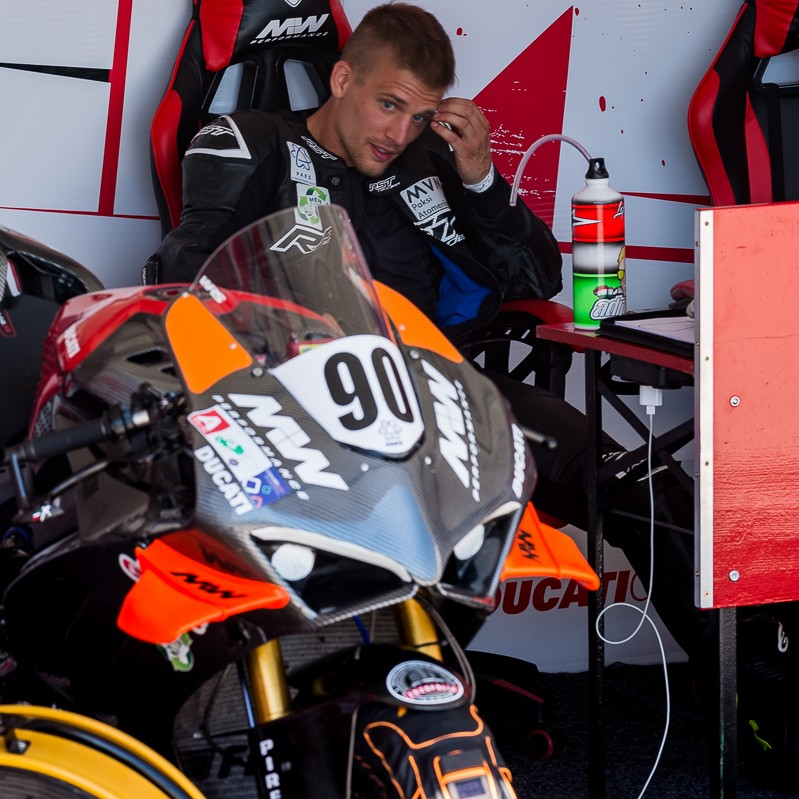
- Gyutai at the 2022 Hungarian Championship Round 2 on Pannoniaring
- Nationality: Hungarian
- Born: 12 November 1990 (age 36); Budapest
- Current team: MW Performance Racing Team
- Bike number: 90
- Website: instagram.com/adriangyutai90
Motorcycle racing career statistics
Moto3 World Championship
Active years	2015
Manufacturers	TVR
Championships	0
2015 championship position	NC (0 pts)
Starts / Wins / Podiums / Poles / F. laps / Points; 1 / 0 / 0 / 0 / 0 / 0

Adrián Gyutai (born 12 November 1990) is a Hungarian Grand Prix motorcycle racer. He is a four-time Hungarian Champion (2010 125SP; 2013 SST600; 2021-2022 Superbike) and currently races in the Hungarian Superbike and Alpe-Adria International Championship in Superbike category on a Ducati Panigale V4R. He races for MW Performance Racing Team led by János Mohai.

== Career statistics ==
=== Grand Prix motorcycle racing ===
==== By season ====
Season	Class	Motorcycle	Race	Win	Podium	Pole	FLap	Pts	Plcd
2015	Moto3	TVR	1	0	0	0	0	0	NC
Total			1	0	0	0	0	0	

==== Races by year ====
Yr	Class	Bike	1	2	3	4	5	6	7	8	9	10	11	12	13	14	15	16	17	18	Pos	Pts
2015	Moto3	TVR	QAT	AME	ARG	SPA	FRA	ITA	CAT	NED	GER	INP	CZE	GBR	RSM; 26	ARA	JPN	AUS	MAL	VAL	NC	0
