= List of Grand Prix motorcycle racers: K =

Name	Seasons	World Championships	MotoGP Wins	500cc Wins	350cc Wins	Moto2 Wins	250cc Wins	Moto3 Wins	125cc Wins	80cc Wins	50cc Wins	MotoE Wins
(Finland) Mika Kallio	2001-2020	0	0	0	0	4	5	0	7	0	0	0
(Japan) Hideo Kanaya	1967, 1972-1973, 1975	0	0	1	1	0	1	0	0	0	0	0
(Germany) Maximilian Kappler	2014-2016	0	0	0	0	0	0	0	0	0	0	0
(Japan) Takazumi Katayama	1974, 1976-1985, 1988-1989	1 350cc - 1977	0	1	7	0	3	0	0	0	0	0
(Japan) Daijiro Kato	1996-2003	1 250cc - 2001	0	0	0	0	17	0	0	0	0	0
(Australia) Ken Kavanagh	1951-1956, 1959-1960	0	0	1	4	0	0	0	0	0	0	0
(Brazil) Meikon Kawakami	2019	0	0	0	0	0	0	0	0	0	0	0
(Australia) Joel Kelso	2021-	0	0	0	0	0	0	0	0	0	0	0
(United States) Sean Dylan Kelly	2019, 2022-2023	0	0	0	0	0	0	0	0	0	0	0
(United Kingdom) Danny Kent	2010-2018	1 Moto3 - 2015	0	0	0	0	0	8	0	0	0	0
(Netherlands) Henk van Kessel	1972-1976, 1978-1986	1 50cc - 1974	0	0	0	0	0	0	0	0	7	0
(Malaysia) Zulfahmi Khairuddin	2009-2015, 2018	0	0	0	0	0	0	0	0	0	0	0
(Germany) Ewald Kluge	1952	0	0	0	0	0	0	0	0	0	0	0
(Switzerland) Bruno Kneubühler	1972-1989	0	0	0	1	0	0	0	3	0	1	0
(United States) John Kocinski	1988-1994, 1998-1999	1 250cc - 1990	0	4	0	0	9	0	0	0	0	0
(Austria) Maximilian Kofler	2017-2021	0	0	0	0	0	0	0	0	0	0	0
(Finland) Pentti Korhonen	1969-1970, 1972-1979	0	0	0	1	0	0	0	0	0	0	0
(Czech Republic) Jakub Kornfeil	2009-2020	0	0	0	0	0	0	0	0	0	0	0
(Japan) Tomoyoshi Koyama	2000, 2003-2012, 2014-2015	0	0	0	0	0	0	0	1	0	0	0
(Thailand) Decha Kraisart	2000, 2013-2014	0	0	0	0	0	0	0	0	0	0	0
(Thailand) Krittapat Keankum	2023	0	0	0	0	0	0	0	0	0	0	0
(Switzerland) Randy Krummenacher	2006-2015, 2023	0	0	0	0	0	0	0	0	0	0	1
(Thailand) Keminth Kubo	2021-2022	0	0	0	0	0	0	0	0	0	0	0
(Japan) Yuki Kunii	2019-2021, 2025	0	0	0	0	0	0	0	0	0	0	0
(Japan) Keisuke Kurihara	2015	0	0	0	0	0	0	0	0	0	0	0
(Japan) Hiroaki Kuzuhara	2003, 2005-2006	0	0	0	0	0	0	0	0	0	0	0
