= Gyutai =

Gyutai is a surname. Notable people with the surname include:

- Adrián Gyutai (born 1990), Hungarian Grand Prix motorcycle racer
- Csaba Gyutai (born 1966), Hungarian politician
