= Keisuke Kurihara =

Keisuke Kurihara may refer to:

- Keisuke Kurihara (footballer) (born 1973), Japanese footballer
- Keisuke Kurihara (motorcyclist) (born 1997), Japanese motorcycle racer
