= Alexis Masbou =

French motorcycle racer

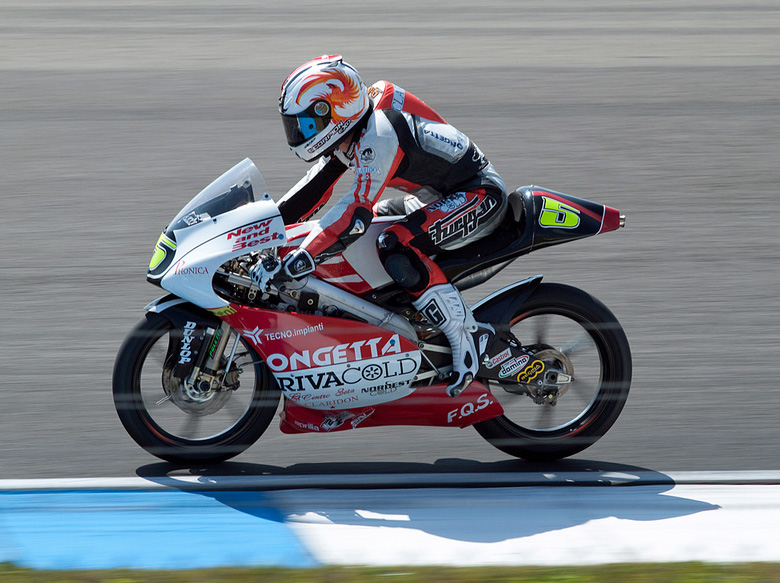
- Masbou at the 2010 Dutch TT
- Nationality: French
- Born: 2 June 1987 (age 39); Albi, France
- Current team: Moto Ain CRT
- Bike number: 96
Motorcycle racing career statistics
Moto3 World Championship
Active years	2012–2016
Manufacturers	Honda, FTR Honda
Championships	0
2016 championship position	NC (0 pts)
Starts / Wins / Podiums / Poles / F. laps / Points; 72 / 2 / 4 / 1 / 1 / 417
125cc World Championship
Active years	2003–2011
Manufacturers	Honda, Malaguti, Loncin, Aprilia, KTM
Championships	0
2011 championship position	22nd (18 pts)
Starts / Wins / Podiums / Poles / F. laps / Points; 95 / 0 / 0 / 0 / 0 / 95

Alexis Masbou (born 2 June 1987) is a French motorcycle rider. He currently rides a Yamaha YZF-R1 in the Endurance FIM World Cup.

== Career ==
=== Early career ===
Masbou was born in Albi. Before he reached the world championship, he was joining the CDM French motorsport school. He started racing in the 50cc French class in 2001. From 2002, he stepped up to the national 125cc class. He was very successful and looked to be the next French revelation. In 2003, he made his wild-card debut at the Le Mans GP. In 2004, he became the national 125cc champion and he was ready to challenge the World Championship riders.

=== 125cc/Moto3 World Championship ===
In 2005, Masbou signed for the Ajo Moto Honda team to compete in the 125cc class, teamed with Japanese youngster Tomoyoshi Koyama. Masbou had a good debut season, with a best result of fifth in the Dutch TT, having run in the leading group throughout. For 2006, he rode an unfashionable Malaguti, with little success. In 2007, he again raced a Honda, finishing 21st overall best results were two tenth places. For 2008, he joined the new Loncin team, struggling to make this bike competitive and scoring four points. For 2009, he was joined in the Loncin team by Koyama.

At the 2014 Czech Republic Grand Prix, Masbou achieved his first victory at World Championship level after prevailing in a 17-rider lead battle, holding off Enea Bastianini and Danny Kent on the final lap.

Masbou earned another win at the 2015 Qatar motorcycle Grand Prix.

Masbou still remained with the team for 2016 season, but the team would use newly Peugeot MGP3O. After failing to score a single point in nine races, he was replaced by Albert Arenas ahead of the Austrian Grand Prix.

Masbou became ineligible to compete in Moto3 in 2017 due to the age limit.

== Career statistics ==
=== FIM CEV Moto3 Junior World Championship ===
==== Races by year ====
(key) (Races in bold indicate pole position; races in italics indicate fastest lap)

Year	Bike	1	2	3	4	5	6	7	8	9	10	11	Pos	Pts
2014	Honda	JER1	JER2	LMS	ARA	CAT1	CAT2	ALB	NAV	ALG	VAL1; 2	VAL2; 5	17th	31

=== Grand Prix motorcycle racing ===
==== Races by year ====
(key) (Races in bold indicate pole position; races in italics indicate fastest lap)

Year	Class	Bike	1	2	3	4	5	6	7	8	9	10	11	12	13	14	15	16	17	18	Pos	Pts
2003	125cc	Honda	JPN	RSA	SPA	FRA; Ret	ITA	CAT	NED	GBR	GER	CZE	POR	BRA	PAC	MAL	AUS	VAL			NC	0
2004	125cc	Honda	RSA	SPA	FRA; Ret	ITA	CAT	NED	BRA	GER	GBR	CZE	POR	JPN	QAT	MAL	AUS	VAL			NC	0
2005	125cc	Honda	SPA; Ret	POR; 13	CHN; 21	FRA; Ret	ITA; 10	CAT; Ret	NED; 5	GBR; Ret	GER; DSQ	CZE; Ret	JPN; 20	MAL; 14	QAT; 20	AUS; 10	TUR; Ret	VAL; Ret			18th	28
2006	125cc	Malaguti	SPA; DNS	QAT; DNS	TUR; 20	CHN; Ret	FRA; 29	ITA; Ret	CAT; Ret	NED; Ret	GBR	GER; 25	CZE; 23	MAL; DNS	AUS	JPN	POR	VAL			NC	0
2007	125cc	Honda	QAT; 10	SPA; Ret	TUR; Ret	CHN; 13	FRA; 12	ITA; Ret	CAT; 16	GBR; 19	NED; 16	GER; 19	CZE; 14	RSM; 21	POR; 14	JPN; 21	AUS; Ret	MAL; 10	VAL; 14		21st	25
2008	125cc	Loncin	QAT; Ret	SPA; 21	POR; 20	CHN; Ret	FRA; 15	ITA; 27	CAT; Ret	GBR; Ret	NED; 23	GER; 20	CZE; 26	RSM; Ret	INP; 26	JPN; 15	AUS; Ret	MAL; Ret	VAL; 14		28th	4
2009	125cc	Loncin	QAT; 26	JPN; 21	SPA; Ret	FRA; Ret	ITA; Ret	CAT; Ret	NED; Ret	GER; Ret	GBR; Ret	CZE; 24	INP; Ret	RSM	POR	AUS	MAL	VAL			NC	0
2010	125cc	Aprilia	QAT; 10	SPA; 9	FRA; 16	ITA; 12	GBR; Ret	NED; Ret	CAT; Ret	GER; 13	CZE; Ret	INP; DNS	RSM; Ret	ARA	JPN	MAL	AUS	POR	VAL		20th	20
2011	125cc	Aprilia	QAT	SPA	POR	FRA; 15															22nd	18
2011	125cc	KTM					CAT; 14	GBR; 14	NED; 11	ITA; 16	GER; 26	CZE; Ret	INP; 14	RSM; 20	ARA; Ret	JPN; Ret	AUS; 14	MAL; 12	VAL; 22		22nd	18
2012	Moto3	Honda	QAT; Ret	SPA; 5	POR; 9	FRA; Ret	CAT; 5	GBR; 4	NED; 7	GER; 2	ITA; 12	INP; 10	CZE; 16	RSM	ARA	JPN	MAL	AUS	VAL		13th	81
2013	Moto3	FTR Honda	QAT; 14	AME; 8	SPA; 10	FRA; 9	ITA; 12	CAT; 8	NED; 9	GER; DNS	INP; 12	CZE; 6	GBR; 8	RSM; Ret	ARA; 11	MAL; 7	AUS; 10	JPN; Ret	VAL; 6		8th	94
2014	Moto3	Honda	QAT; 7	AME; 6	ARG; 11	SPA; 12	FRA; 9	ITA; 6	CAT; 11	NED; 4	GER; 3	INP; 4	CZE; 1	GBR; 8	RSM; 7	ARA; 10	JPN; Ret	AUS; 6	MAL; 6	VAL; 12	6th	164
2015	Moto3	Honda	**QAT**; 1	AME; 16	ARG; Ret	SPA; 15	FRA; Ret	ITA; 9	CAT; 18	NED; Ret	GER; 8	INP; 32	CZE; Ret	GBR; 11	RSM; 7	ARA; 8	JPN; Ret	AUS; 9	MAL; 9	VAL; 15	13th	78
2016	Moto3	Peugeot	QAT; 24	ARG; 21	AME; 16	SPA; Ret	FRA; 19	ITA; Ret	CAT; Ret	NED; Ret	GER; 16	AUT	CZE	GBR	RSM	ARA	JPN	AUS	MAL	VAL	NC	0
