= Niklas Ajo =

Finnish motorcycle racer

- Nationality: Finnish
- Born: 10 July 1994 (age 32); Valkeakoski, Finland
Motorcycle racing career statistics
Moto3 World Championship
| Active years | 2012–2015 |
| Manufacturers | KTM, Husqvarna |
| Championships | 0 |
| 2015 championship position | 22nd (21 pts) |
Starts / Wins / Podiums / Poles / F. laps / Points; 60 / 0 / 0 / 0 / 0 / 175
125cc World Championship
| Active years | 2010–2011 |
| Manufacturers | Aprilia, Derbi |
| Championships | 0 |
| 2011 championship position | 21st (19 pts) |
Starts / Wins / Podiums / Poles / F. laps / Points; 16 / 0 / 0 / 0 / 0 / 19

Niklas 'Niki' Ajo (born 10 July 1994, in Valkeakoski) is a Finnish former Grand Prix motorcycle racer, and the 2009 champion of the Finnish 125GP Championship. Ajo has also competed in the Red Bull MotoGP Rookies Cup and the Spanish 125GP Championship.

Ajo is currently working as crew chief and race engineer for the Red Bull KTM Ajo team founded by his father, former motorcycle racer Aki Ajo.

== Career statistics ==
=== Red Bull MotoGP Rookies Cup ===
==== Races by year ====
(key) (Races in bold indicate pole position, races in italics indicate fastest lap)

| Year | 1 | 2 | 3 | 4 | 5 | 6 | 7 | 8 | 9 | 10 | Pos | Pts |
|---|---|---|---|---|---|---|---|---|---|---|---|---|
| 2008 | SPA1; DNS | SPA2; DNS | POR | FRA | ITA; 20 | GBR; Ret | NED; DNS | GER; 15 | CZE1; 16 | CZE2; 18 | 26th | 1 |

=== Grand Prix motorcycle racing ===
==== By season ====
| Season | Class | Motorcycle | Team | Race | Win | Podium | Pole | FLap | Pts | Plcd |
|---|---|---|---|---|---|---|---|---|---|---|
| 2010 | 125cc | Derbi | Monlau Competicion | 1 | 0 | 0 | 0 | 0 | 0 | NC |
| 2011 | 125cc | Aprilia | TT Motion Events Racing | 15 | 0 | 0 | 0 | 0 | 19 | 21st |
| 2012 | Moto3 | KTM | TT Motion Events Racing | 15 | 0 | 0 | 0 | 0 | 40 | 19th |
| 2013 | Moto3 | KTM | Avant Tecno | 17 | 0 | 0 | 0 | 0 | 62 | 14th |
| 2014 | Moto3 | Husqvarna | Avant Tecno Husqvarna Ajo | 17 | 0 | 0 | 0 | 0 | 52 | 15th |
| 2015 | Moto3 | KTM | RBA Racing Team | 11 | 0 | 0 | 0 | 0 | 21 | 22nd |
| Total | | | | **76** | **0** | **0** | **0** | **0** | **194** | |

==== Races by year ====
(key) (Races in bold indicate pole position, races in italics indicate fastest lap)

| Year | Class | Bike | 1 | 2 | 3 | 4 | 5 | 6 | 7 | 8 | 9 | 10 | 11 | 12 | 13 | 14 | 15 | 16 | 17 | 18 | Pos | Pts |
|---|---|---|---|---|---|---|---|---|---|---|---|---|---|---|---|---|---|---|---|---|---|---|
| 2010 | 125cc | Derbi | QAT | SPA | FRA | ITA | GBR | NED | CAT | GER | CZE | INP | RSM | ARA | JPN | MAL | AUS | POR | VAL; Ret | | NC | 0 |
| 2011 | 125cc | Aprilia | QAT; 17 | SPA; Ret | POR; 14 | FRA; Ret | CAT; 13 | GBR; 16 | NED; Ret | ITA; 22 | GER; 10 | CZE; Ret | INP; Ret | RSM | ARA; Ret | JPN; Ret | AUS; Ret | MAL | VAL; 8 | | 21st | 19 |
| 2012 | Moto3 | KTM | QAT; 13 | SPA; Ret | POR; EX | FRA; 15 | CAT; 21 | GBR; 14 | NED; 8 | GER; 14 | ITA; 11 | IND; DSQ | CZE; EX | RSM; Ret | ARA; 14 | JPN; 13 | MAL; 9 | AUS; Ret | VAL; 9 | | 19th | 40 |
| 2013 | Moto3 | KTM | QAT; 9 | AME; 15 | SPA; 6 | FRA; Ret | ITA; 8 | CAT; Ret | NED; 10 | GER; 18 | INP; 11 | CZE; Ret | GBR; 15 | RSM; 11 | ARA; 21 | MAL; 12 | AUS; 9 | JPN; 8 | VAL; Ret | | 14th | 62 |
| 2014 | Moto3 | Husqvarna | QAT; 26 | AME; 14 | ARG; 8 | SPA; 10 | FRA; Ret | ITA; 5 | CAT; 8 | NED; Ret | GER | INP; Ret | CZE; 12 | GBR; 10 | RSM; Ret | ARA; 25 | JPN; Ret | AUS; 9 | MAL; Ret | VAL; Ret | 15th | 52 |
| 2015 | Moto3 | KTM | QAT; Ret | AME; 14 | ARG; 10 | SPA; 17 | FRA; Ret | ITA; 12 | CAT; 13 | NED; 17 | GER; 10 | INP; 30 | CZE; Ret | GBR | RSM | ARA | JPN | AUS | MAL | VAL | 22nd | 21 |
