= 2015 Indianapolis motorcycle Grand Prix =

2015 Indianapolis Grand Prix
Race details
- Race 10 of 18 races in the 2015 Grand Prix motorcycle racing season
- Date: August 9, 2015
- Official name: Red Bull Indianapolis Grand Prix
- Location: Indianapolis Motor Speedway
- Course: Permanent racing facility; 4.170 km (2.591 mi)

MotoGP
Pole position
Rider	(Spain) Marc Márquez	Honda
Time	1:31.884	
Fastest lap
Rider	(Spain) Marc Márquez	Honda
Time	1:32.625 on lap 23	
Podium
First	(Spain) Marc Márquez	Honda
Second	(Spain) Jorge Lorenzo	Yamaha
Third	(Italy) Valentino Rossi	Yamaha

Moto2
Pole position
Rider	(Spain) Álex Rins	Kalex
Time	1:36.549	
Fastest lap
Rider	(Italy) Franco Morbidelli	Kalex
Time	1:37.498 on lap 12	
Podium
First	(Spain) Álex Rins	Kalex
Second	(France) Johann Zarco	Kalex
Third	(Italy) Franco Morbidelli	Kalex

Moto3
Pole position
Rider	(United Kingdom) Danny Kent	Honda
Time	1:40.703	
Fastest lap
Rider	(United Kingdom) Danny Kent	Honda
Time	1:41.449 on lap 6	
Podium
First	(Belgium) Livio Loi	Honda
Second	(United Kingdom) John McPhee	Honda
Third	(Germany) Philipp Öttl	KTM

The 2015 Indianapolis motorcycle Grand Prix was the tenth round of the 2015 Grand Prix motorcycle racing season. It was held at the Indianapolis Motor Speedway in Speedway, Indiana on August 9, 2015.

In the MotoGP category, Marc Márquez took his fifth pole position of the season and ultimately took his third win of the season — and his fifth consecutive win at Indianapolis Motor Speedway. Márquez's victory was also the 700th victory in the Grand Prix history for the Honda brand. Behind Márquez were the two Movistar Yamaha riders, Jorge Lorenzo, and Valentino Rossi; the podium was swept by these riders in the previous year. Further down the order, Ducati's Andrea Dovizioso started from tenth on the grid, but he went off track on the first lap. After he fell to the rear of the field, Dovizioso was able to finish ninth, just behind Cal Crutchlow. Forward Racing did not compete this event following the arrest of team boss Giovanni Cuzari. Stefan Bradl, who was joining Gresini Racing, finished in twentieth place. Toni Elías, who replaced Karel Abraham as Abraham recovered from injuries sustained at the Catalan Grand Prix, finished in twenty-second. Jack Miller crashed out of the race with twenty laps remaining.

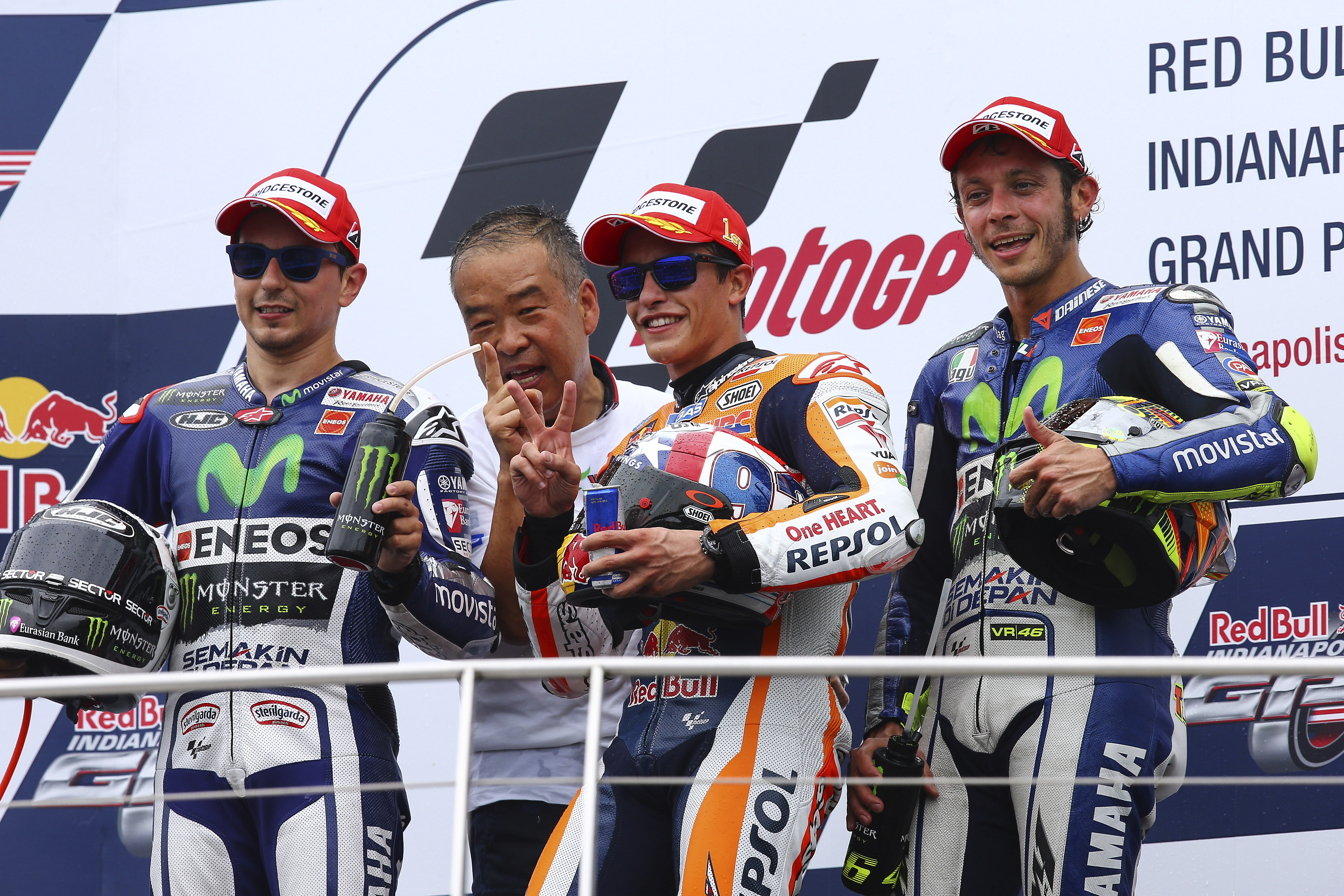
Jorge Lorenzo, Marc Márquez and Valentino Rossi, celebrating on the podium after finishing in second, first and third place at the MotoGP race.

== Classification ==
=== MotoGP ===
Pos.	No.	Rider	Team	Manufacturer	Laps	Time/Retired	Grid	Points
1	93	(Spain) Marc Márquez	Repsol Honda Team	Honda	27	41:55.371	1	25
2	99	(Spain) Jorge Lorenzo	Movistar Yamaha MotoGP	Yamaha	27	+0.688	3	20
3	46	(Italy) Valentino Rossi	Movistar Yamaha MotoGP	Yamaha	27	+5.966	8	16
4	26	(Spain) Dani Pedrosa	Repsol Honda Team	Honda	27	+6.147	2	13
5	29	(Italy) Andrea Iannone	Ducati Team	Ducati	27	+21.528	7	11
6	38	(United Kingdom) Bradley Smith	Monster Yamaha Tech 3	Yamaha	27	+21.751	6	10
7	44	(Spain) Pol Espargaró	Monster Yamaha Tech 3	Yamaha	27	+30.378	11	9
8	35	(United Kingdom) Cal Crutchlow	CWM LCR Honda	Honda	27	+31.607	4	8
9	4	(Italy) Andrea Dovizioso	Ducati Team	Ducati	27	+32.821	10	7
10	9	(Italy) Danilo Petrucci	Octo Pramac Racing	Ducati	27	+34.517	5	6
11	25	(Spain) Maverick Viñales	Team Suzuki Ecstar	Suzuki	27	+39.010	9	5
12	68	(Colombia) Yonny Hernández	Octo Pramac Racing	Ducati	27	+41.815	15	4
13	45	(United Kingdom) Scott Redding	EG 0,0 Marc VDS	Honda	27	+50.209	13	3
14	41	(Spain) Aleix Espargaró	Team Suzuki Ecstar	Suzuki	27	+1:00.465	12	2
15	8	(Spain) Héctor Barberá	Avintia Racing	Ducati	27	+1:04.147	14	1
16	69	(United States) Nicky Hayden	Aspar MotoGP Team	Honda	27	+1:05.066	20	
17	63	(France) Mike Di Meglio	Avintia Racing	Ducati	27	+1:06.941	22	
18	19	(Spain) Álvaro Bautista	Aprilia Racing Team Gresini	Aprilia	27	+1:13.862	18	
19	50	(Republic of Ireland) Eugene Laverty	Aspar MotoGP Team	Honda	27	+1:18.706	19	
20	6	(Germany) Stefan Bradl	Aprilia Racing Team Gresini	Aprilia	27	+1:19.730	17	
21	15	(San Marino) Alex de Angelis	E-Motion IodaRacing Team	ART	27	+1:19.882	21	
22	24	(Spain) Toni Elías	AB Motoracing	Honda	27	+1:19.934	23	
Ret	43	(Australia) Jack Miller	CWM LCR Honda	Honda	7	Accident	16	

=== Moto2 ===
Pos.	No.	Rider	Manufacturer	Laps	Time/Retired	Grid	Points
1	40	(Spain) Álex Rins	Kalex	25	41:18.866	1	25
2	5	(France) Johann Zarco	Kalex	25	+0.482	8	20
3	21	(Italy) Franco Morbidelli	Kalex	25	+0.888	9	16
4	77	(Switzerland) Dominique Aegerter	Kalex	25	+1.719	11	13
5	1	(Spain) Tito Rabat	Kalex	25	+2.963	2	11
6	12	(Switzerland) Thomas Lüthi	Kalex	25	+3.478	4	10
7	49	(Spain) Axel Pons	Kalex	25	+5.064	18	9
8	19	(Belgium) Xavier Siméon	Kalex	25	+7.562	16	8
9	30	(Japan) Takaaki Nakagami	Kalex	25	+9.316	6	7
10	73	(Spain) Álex Márquez	Kalex	25	+9.801	13	6
11	25	(Malaysia) Azlan Shah	Kalex	25	+9.899	12	5
12	94	(Germany) Jonas Folger	Kalex	25	+10.108	5	4
13	95	(Australia) Anthony West	Speed Up	25	+17.106	23	3
14	23	(Germany) Marcel Schrötter	Tech 3	25	+25.187	19	2
15	70	(Switzerland) Robin Mulhauser	Kalex	25	+32.587	21	1
16	39	(Spain) Luis Salom	Kalex	25	+37.611	20	
17	2	(Switzerland) Jesko Raffin	Kalex	25	+38.889	24	
18	10	(Thailand) Thitipong Warokorn	Kalex	25	+49.094	27	
19	66	(Germany) Florian Alt	Suter	25	+59.167	28	
Ret	55	(Malaysia) Hafizh Syahrin	Kalex	24	Accident	14	
Ret	22	(United Kingdom) Sam Lowes	Speed Up	20	Accident	7	
Ret	97	(Spain) Xavier Vierge	Tech 3	20	Accident	25	
Ret	4	(Switzerland) Randy Krummenacher	Kalex	18	Retirement	15	
Ret	96	(France) Louis Rossi	Tech 3	15	Retirement	26	
Ret	15	(Thailand) Ratthapark Wilairot	Suter	14	Accident	22	
Ret	36	(Finland) Mika Kallio	Kalex	11	Retirement	3	
Ret	11	(Germany) Sandro Cortese	Kalex	10	Accident	10	
Ret	60	(Spain) Julián Simón	Speed Up	6	Retirement	17	
OFFICIAL MOTO2 REPORT

=== Moto3 ===
Pos.	No.	Rider	Manufacturer	Laps	Time/Retired	Grid	Points
1	11	(Belgium) Livio Loi	Honda	23	40:50.747	26	25
2	17	(United Kingdom) John McPhee	Honda	23	+38.860	18	20
3	65	(Germany) Philipp Öttl	KTM	23	+57.781	34	16
4	5	(Italy) Romano Fenati	KTM	23	+1:15.296	11	13
5	32	(Spain) Isaac Viñales	KTM	23	+1:19.814	20	11
6	33	(Italy) Enea Bastianini	Honda	23	+1:23.801	4	10
7	23	(Italy) Niccolò Antonelli	Honda	23	+1:24.586	8	9
8	41	(South Africa) Brad Binder	KTM	23	+1:24.659	6	8
9	9	(Spain) Jorge Navarro	Honda	23	+1:25.292	9	7
10	88	(Spain) Jorge Martín	Mahindra	23	+1:35.105	10	6
11	20	(France) Fabio Quartararo	Honda	23	+1:35.784	5	5
12	98	(Czech Republic) Karel Hanika	KTM	23	+1:35.801	13	4
13	55	(Italy) Andrea Locatelli	Honda	23	+1:35.913	21	3
14	95	(France) Jules Danilo	Honda	23	+1:36.059	15	2
15	44	(Portugal) Miguel Oliveira	KTM	23	+1:43.203	2	1
16	19	(Italy) Alessandro Tonucci	Mahindra	23	+1:49.006	25	
17	2	(Australia) Remy Gardner	Mahindra	22	+1 lap	17	
18	58	(Spain) Juan Francisco Guevara	Mahindra	22	+1 lap	22	
19	29	(Italy) Stefano Manzi	Mahindra	22	+1 lap	33	
20	16	(Italy) Andrea Migno	KTM	22	+1 lap	28	
21	52	(United Kingdom) Danny Kent	Honda	22	+1 lap	1	
22	84	(Czech Republic) Jakub Kornfeil	KTM	22	+1 lap	16	
23	24	(Japan) Tatsuki Suzuki	Mahindra	22	+1 lap	27	
24	6	(Spain) María Herrera	Husqvarna	22	+1 lap	23	
25	63	(Malaysia) Zulfahmi Khairuddin	KTM	22	+1 lap	3	
26	76	(Japan) Hiroki Ono	Honda	22	+1 lap	14	
27	40	(South Africa) Darryn Binder	Mahindra	22	+1 lap	32	
28	48	(Italy) Lorenzo Dalla Porta	Husqvarna	22	+1 lap	30	
29	12	(Italy) Matteo Ferrari	Mahindra	22	+1 lap	31	
30	31	(Finland) Niklas Ajo	KTM	22	+1 lap	19	
31	91	(Argentina) Gabriel Rodrigo	KTM	22	+1 lap	29	
32	10	(France) Alexis Masbou	Honda	22	+1 lap	12	
Ret	7	(Spain) Efrén Vázquez	Honda	15	Retirement	7	
Ret	21	(Italy) Francesco Bagnaia	Mahindra	11	Accident	24	
OFFICIAL MOTO3 REPORT

== Championship standings after the race (MotoGP) ==
Below are the standings for the top seven riders and constructors after round ten has concluded.

Riders' Championship standings

Pos.	Rider	Points
1	(Italy) Valentino Rossi	195
2	(Spain) Jorge Lorenzo	186
3	(Spain) Marc Márquez	139
4	(Italy) Andrea Iannone	129
5	(United Kingdom) Bradley Smith	97
6	(Italy) Andrea Dovizioso	94
7	(Spain) Dani Pedrosa	80

Constructors' Championship standings

Pos.	Constructor	Points
1	(Japan) Yamaha	227
2	(Japan) Honda	184
3	(Italy) Ducati	154
4	(Japan) Suzuki	75
5	(Switzerland) Yamaha Forward	19
6	(Italy) Aprilia	13
7	(Italy) ART	1

Teams' Championship standings

Pos.	Team	Points
1	(Japan) Movistar Yamaha MotoGP	381
2	(Japan) Repsol Honda Team	224
3	(Italy) Ducati Team	223
4	(France) Monster Yamaha Tech 3	170
5	(Japan) Team Suzuki Ecstar	108
6	(Italy) Octo Pramac Racing	93
7	(Monaco) CWM LCR Honda	86

- Note: Only the top seven positions are included for both sets of standings.

Previous race: 2015 German Grand Prix	FIM Grand Prix World Championship; 2015 season	Next race: 2015 Czech Republic Grand Prix
Previous race: 2014 Indianapolis Grand Prix	Indianapolis motorcycle Grand Prix	Next race: None
