= 2015 Czech Republic motorcycle Grand Prix =

2015 Czech Republic Grand Prix
Race details
- Race 11 of 18 races in the 2015 Grand Prix motorcycle racing season
- Date: 16 August 2015
- Official name: bwin Grand Prix České republiky
- Location: Brno Circuit
- Course: Permanent racing facility; 5.403 km (3.357 mi)

MotoGP
Pole position
| Rider | (Spain) Jorge Lorenzo | Yamaha |
| Time | 1:54.989 | |
Fastest lap
| Rider | (Spain) Marc Márquez | Honda |
| Time | 1:56.048 on lap 4 | |
Podium
| First | (Spain) Jorge Lorenzo | Yamaha |
| Second | (Spain) Marc Márquez | Honda |
| Third | (Italy) Valentino Rossi | Yamaha |

Moto2
Pole position
| Rider | (France) Johann Zarco | Kalex |
| Time | 2:01.614 | |
Fastest lap
| Rider | (Switzerland) Thomas Lüthi | Kalex |
| Time | 2:02.422 on lap 5 | |
Podium
| First | (France) Johann Zarco | Kalex |
| Second | (Spain) Tito Rabat | Kalex |
| Third | (Spain) Álex Rins | Kalex |

Moto3
Pole position
| Rider | (Italy) Niccolò Antonelli | Honda |
| Time | 2:07.667 | |
Fastest lap
| Rider | (Portugal) Miguel Oliveira | KTM |
| Time | 2:08.466 on lap 3 | |
Podium
| First | (Italy) Niccolò Antonelli | Honda |
| Second | (Italy) Enea Bastianini | Honda |
| Third | (South Africa) Brad Binder | KTM |

The 2015 Czech Republic motorcycle Grand Prix was the eleventh round of the 2015 MotoGP season. It was held at the Brno Circuit in Brno on 16 August 2015.

In the premier class, Jorge Lorenzo took his second pole position of the season and ultimately his fifth win of the season, ahead of Marc Márquez and Valentino Rossi. Andrea Iannone finished fourth, while fifth place was contested by Andrea Dovizioso and Dani Pedrosa, with Pedrosa ultimately coming out on top by 0.075 seconds. Cal Crutchlow, Maverick Viñales, Alex de Angelis, and Eugene Laverty all crashed out of the race before the halfway mark. With these results, Lorenzo's win gave him the championship lead over Rossi, by virtue of more wins at that point.

In the junior classes, Moto2 championship leader Johann Zarco extended his lead in the championship, winning ahead of Tito Rabat and Álex Rins. In a restarted Moto3 race, Gresini Racing rider Niccolò Antonelli took his first victory ahead of Enea Bastianini and Brad Binder, with the top nine riders being split by 1.42 seconds at the finish.

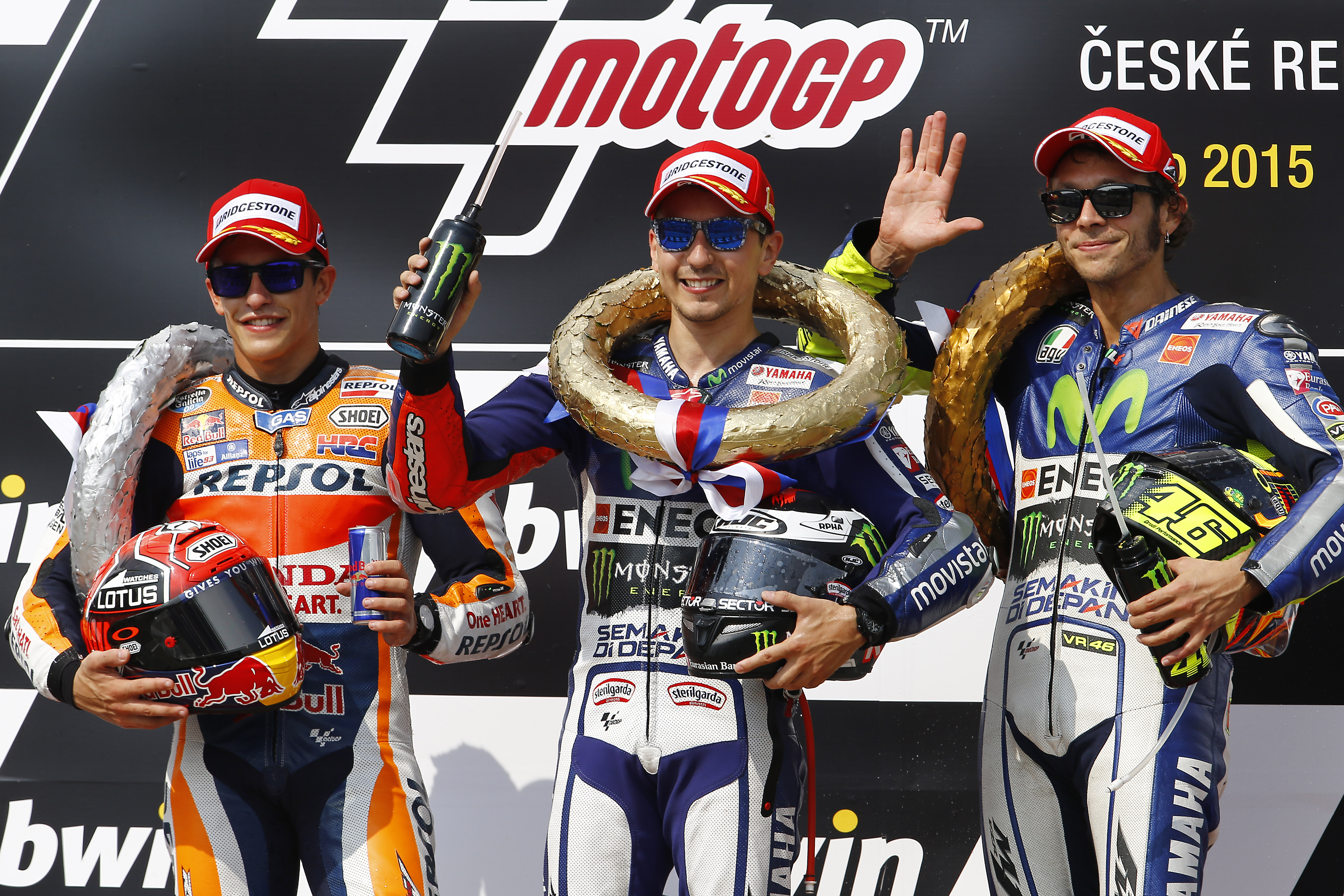
Marc Márquez, Jorge Lorenzo and Valentino Rossi, celebrating on the podium after finishing second, first and third at the MotoGP race.

== Classification ==
=== MotoGP ===
| Pos. | No. | Rider | Team | Manufacturer | Laps | Time/Retired | Grid | Points |
|---|---|---|---|---|---|---|---|---|
| 1 | 99 | (Spain) Jorge Lorenzo | Movistar Yamaha MotoGP | Yamaha | 22 | 42:53.042 | 1 | 25 |
| 2 | 93 | (Spain) Marc Márquez | Repsol Honda Team | Honda | 22 | +4.462 | 2 | 20 |
| 3 | 46 | (Italy) Valentino Rossi | Movistar Yamaha MotoGP | Yamaha | 22 | +10.397 | 3 | 16 |
| 4 | 29 | (Italy) Andrea Iannone | Ducati Team | Ducati | 22 | +13.071 | 4 | 13 |
| 5 | 26 | (Spain) Dani Pedrosa | Repsol Honda Team | Honda | 22 | +15.650 | 9 | 11 |
| 6 | 4 | (Italy) Andrea Dovizioso | Ducati Team | Ducati | 22 | +15.725 | 6 | 10 |
| 7 | 38 | (United Kingdom) Bradley Smith | Monster Yamaha Tech 3 | Yamaha | 22 | +21.821 | 5 | 9 |
| 8 | 44 | (Spain) Pol Espargaró | Monster Yamaha Tech 3 | Yamaha | 22 | +23.240 | 8 | 8 |
| 9 | 41 | (Spain) Aleix Espargaró | Team Suzuki Ecstar | Suzuki | 22 | +43.784 | 15 | 7 |
| 10 | 9 | (Italy) Danilo Petrucci | Octo Pramac Racing | Ducati | 22 | +45.261 | 13 | 6 |
| 11 | 68 | (Colombia) Yonny Hernández | Octo Pramac Racing | Ducati | 22 | +49.973 | 12 | 5 |
| 12 | 45 | (United Kingdom) Scott Redding | EG 0,0 Marc VDS | Honda | 22 | +50.174 | 14 | 4 |
| 13 | 19 | (Spain) Álvaro Bautista | Aprilia Racing Team Gresini | Aprilia | 22 | +54.437 | 19 | 3 |
| 14 | 6 | (Germany) Stefan Bradl | Aprilia Racing Team Gresini | Aprilia | 22 | +54.624 | 16 | 2 |
| 15 | 76 | (France) Loris Baz | Forward Racing | Yamaha Forward | 22 | +1:00.316 | 18 | 1 |
| 16 | 8 | (Spain) Héctor Barberá | Avintia Racing | Ducati | 22 | +1:01.595 | 11 | |
| 17 | 69 | (United States) Nicky Hayden | Aspar MotoGP Team | Honda | 22 | +1:02.388 | 21 | |
| 18 | 63 | (France) Mike Di Meglio | Avintia Racing | Ducati | 22 | +1:05.944 | 17 | |
| 19 | 43 | (Australia) Jack Miller | CWM LCR Honda | Honda | 22 | +1:11.407 | 22 | |
| 20 | 71 | (Italy) Claudio Corti | Forward Racing | Yamaha Forward | 22 | +1:50.033 | 24 | |
| 21 | 17 | (Czech Republic) Karel Abraham | AB Motoracing | Honda | 22 | +2:02.655 | 25 | |
| Ret | 25 | (Spain) Maverick Viñales | Team Suzuki Ecstar | Suzuki | 15 | Accident | 7 | |
| Ret | 35 | (United Kingdom) Cal Crutchlow | CWM LCR Honda | Honda | 14 | Accident | 10 | |
| Ret | 50 | (Republic of Ireland) Eugene Laverty | Aspar MotoGP Team | Honda | 4 | Accident | 20 | |
| Ret | 15 | (San Marino) Alex de Angelis | E-Motion IodaRacing Team | ART | 3 | Accident | 23 | |

=== Moto2 ===
| Pos. | No. | Rider | Manufacturer | Laps | Time/Retired | Grid | Points |
|---|---|---|---|---|---|---|---|
| 1 | 5 | (France) Johann Zarco | Kalex | 20 | 41:02.500 | 1 | 25 |
| 2 | 1 | (Spain) Tito Rabat | Kalex | 20 | +1.421 | 2 | 20 |
| 3 | 40 | (Spain) Álex Rins | Kalex | 20 | +1.785 | 3 | 16 |
| 4 | 73 | (Spain) Álex Márquez | Kalex | 20 | +4.393 | 7 | 13 |
| 5 | 22 | (United Kingdom) Sam Lowes | Speed Up | 20 | +7.844 | 13 | 11 |
| 6 | 94 | (Germany) Jonas Folger | Kalex | 20 | +8.056 | 10 | 10 |
| 7 | 12 | (Switzerland) Thomas Lüthi | Kalex | 20 | +9.882 | 5 | 9 |
| 8 | 11 | (Germany) Sandro Cortese | Kalex | 20 | +10.074 | 4 | 8 |
| 9 | 39 | (Spain) Luis Salom | Kalex | 20 | +11.921 | 15 | 7 |
| 10 | 21 | (Italy) Franco Morbidelli | Kalex | 20 | +12.479 | 8 | 6 |
| 11 | 3 | (Italy) Simone Corsi | Kalex | 20 | +17.694 | 12 | 5 |
| 12 | 30 | (Japan) Takaaki Nakagami | Kalex | 20 | +17.763 | 16 | 4 |
| 13 | 77 | (Switzerland) Dominique Aegerter | Kalex | 20 | +18.352 | 6 | 3 |
| 14 | 55 | (Malaysia) Hafizh Syahrin | Kalex | 20 | +18.522 | 17 | 2 |
| 15 | 36 | (Finland) Mika Kallio | Kalex | 20 | +19.377 | 18 | 1 |
| 16 | 19 | (Belgium) Xavier Siméon | Kalex | 20 | +20.811 | 19 | |
| 17 | 49 | (Spain) Axel Pons | Kalex | 20 | +21.272 | 9 | |
| 18 | 60 | (Spain) Julián Simón | Speed Up | 20 | +22.119 | 22 | |
| 19 | 23 | (Germany) Marcel Schrötter | Tech 3 | 20 | +25.946 | 21 | |
| 20 | 4 | (Switzerland) Randy Krummenacher | Kalex | 20 | +26.586 | 14 | |
| 21 | 95 | (Australia) Anthony West | Speed Up | 20 | +39.425 | 23 | |
| 22 | 57 | (Spain) Edgar Pons | Kalex | 20 | +44.290 | 27 | |
| 23 | 25 | (Malaysia) Azlan Shah | Kalex | 20 | +44.657 | 25 | |
| 24 | 88 | (Spain) Ricard Cardús | Suter | 20 | +44.747 | 28 | |
| 25 | 10 | (Thailand) Thitipong Warokorn | Kalex | 20 | +46.960 | 26 | |
| 26 | 2 | (Switzerland) Jesko Raffin | Kalex | 20 | +53.547 | 31 | |
| Ret | 97 | (Spain) Xavi Vierge | Tech 3 | 16 | Retirement | 30 | |
| Ret | 7 | (Italy) Lorenzo Baldassarri | Kalex | 12 | Retirement | 11 | |
| Ret | 66 | (Germany) Florian Alt | Suter | 12 | Retirement | 29 | |
| Ret | 96 | (France) Louis Rossi | Tech 3 | 11 | Retirement | 20 | |
| Ret | 70 | (Switzerland) Robin Mulhauser | Kalex | 3 | Accident | 24 | |
OFFICIAL MOTO2 REPORT

=== Moto3 ===
The first attempt to run the race was interrupted following two separate accidents involving multiple riders. For the restart, the race distance was reduced from 19 to 12 laps.

| Pos. | No. | Rider | Manufacturer | Laps | Time/Retired | Grid | Points |
|---|---|---|---|---|---|---|---|
| 1 | 23 | (Italy) Niccolò Antonelli | Honda | 12 | 25:56.866 | 1 | 25 |
| 2 | 33 | (Italy) Enea Bastianini | Honda | 12 | +0.152 | 15 | 20 |
| 3 | 41 | (South Africa) Brad Binder | KTM | 12 | +0.376 | 6 | 16 |
| 4 | 7 | (Spain) Efrén Vázquez | Honda | 12 | +0.540 | 8 | 13 |
| 5 | 9 | (Spain) Jorge Navarro | Honda | 12 | +0.560 | 3 | 11 |
| 6 | 5 | (Italy) Romano Fenati | KTM | 12 | +0.821 | 22 | 10 |
| 7 | 52 | (United Kingdom) Danny Kent | Honda | 12 | +1.179 | 2 | 9 |
| 8 | 44 | (Portugal) Miguel Oliveira | KTM | 12 | +1.188 | 12 | 8 |
| 9 | 84 | (Czech Republic) Jakub Kornfeil | KTM | 12 | +1.420 | 19 | 7 |
| 10 | 17 | (United Kingdom) John McPhee | Honda | 12 | +3.385 | 10 | 6 |
| 11 | 88 | (Spain) Jorge Martín | Mahindra | 12 | +5.751 | 9 | 5 |
| 12 | 21 | (Italy) Francesco Bagnaia | Mahindra | 12 | +5.846 | 27 | 4 |
| 13 | 16 | (Italy) Andrea Migno | KTM | 12 | +5.910 | 26 | 3 |
| 14 | 58 | (Spain) Juan Francisco Guevara | Mahindra | 12 | +6.173 | 13 | 2 |
| 15 | 65 | (Germany) Philipp Öttl | KTM | 12 | +6.268 | 24 | 1 |
| 16 | 40 | (South Africa) Darryn Binder | Mahindra | 12 | +7.648 | 16 | |
| 17 | 2 | (Australia) Remy Gardner | Mahindra | 12 | +7.702 | 17 | |
| 18 | 11 | (Belgium) Livio Loi | Honda | 12 | +8.207 | 32 | |
| 19 | 48 | (Italy) Lorenzo Dalla Porta | Husqvarna | 12 | +14.302 | 23 | |
| 20 | 24 | (Japan) Tatsuki Suzuki | Mahindra | 12 | +16.013 | 20 | |
| 21 | 12 | (Italy) Matteo Ferrari | Mahindra | 12 | +16.127 | 35 | |
| 22 | 63 | (Malaysia) Zulfahmi Khairuddin | KTM | 12 | +16.742 | 33 | |
| 23 | 6 | (Spain) María Herrera | Husqvarna | 12 | +16.927 | 31 | |
| 24 | 29 | (Italy) Stefano Manzi | Mahindra | 12 | +18.967 | 30 | |
| 25 | 19 | (Italy) Alessandro Tonucci | Mahindra | 12 | +31.460 | 29 | |
| 26 | 98 | (Czech Republic) Karel Hanika | KTM | 12 | +37.086 | 7 | |
| 27 | 95 | (France) Jules Danilo | Honda | 12 | +1:01.665 | 11 | |
| Ret | 86 | (Germany) Kevin Hanus | Honda | 9 | Accident | 36 | |
| Ret | 10 | (France) Alexis Masbou | Honda | 8 | Accident | 5 | |
| Ret | 20 | (France) Fabio Quartararo | Honda | 7 | Retirement | 4 | |
| Ret | 32 | (Spain) Isaac Viñales | KTM | 1 | Accident | 14 | |
| DNS | 97 | (Germany) Maximilian Kappler | FTR Honda | 0 | Did not restart | 34 | |
| DNS | 76 | (Japan) Hiroki Ono | Honda | 0 | Did not restart | 18 | |
| DNS | 55 | (Italy) Andrea Locatelli | Honda | 0 | Did not restart | 21 | |
| DNS | 91 | (Argentina) Gabriel Rodrigo | KTM | 0 | Did not restart | 25 | |
| DNS | 31 | (Finland) Niklas Ajo | KTM | 0 | Did not restart | 28 | |
OFFICIAL MOTO3 REPORT

== Championship standings after the race (MotoGP) ==
Below are the standings for the top five riders and constructors after round eleven has concluded.

Riders' Championship standings

| Pos. | Rider | Points |
|---|---|---|
| 1 | (Spain) Jorge Lorenzo | 211 |
| 2 | (Italy) Valentino Rossi | 211 |
| 3 | (Spain) Marc Márquez | 159 |
| 4 | (Italy) Andrea Iannone | 142 |
| 5 | (United Kingdom) Bradley Smith | 106 |

Constructors' Championship standings

| Pos. | Constructor | Points |
|---|---|---|
| 1 | (Japan) Yamaha | 252 |
| 2 | (Japan) Honda | 204 |
| 3 | (Italy) Ducati | 167 |
| 4 | (Japan) Suzuki | 82 |
| 5 | (Switzerland) Yamaha Forward | 20 |

Teams' Championship standings

| Pos. | Team | Points |
|---|---|---|
| 1 | (Japan) Movistar Yamaha MotoGP | 422 |
| 2 | (Japan) Repsol Honda Team | 255 |
| 3 | (Italy) Ducati Team | 246 |
| 4 | (France) Monster Yamaha Tech 3 | 187 |
| 5 | (Japan) Team Suzuki Ecstar | 115 |

- Note: Only the top five positions are included for all standings.

| Previous race: 2015 Indianapolis Grand Prix | FIM Grand Prix World Championship; 2015 season | Next race: 2015 British Grand Prix |
| Previous race: 2014 Czech Republic Grand Prix | Czech Republic motorcycle Grand Prix | Next race: 2016 Czech Republic Grand Prix |
