= 2015 Spanish motorcycle Grand Prix =

(Spain) 2015 Spanish Grand Prix
Race details
- Race 4 of 18 races in the 2015 Grand Prix motorcycle racing season
- Date: 3 May 2015
- Official name: Gran Premio bwin de España
- Location: Circuito de Jerez
- Course: Permanent racing facility; 4.423 km (2.748 mi)

MotoGP
Pole position
| Rider | (Spain) Jorge Lorenzo | Yamaha |
| Time | 1:37.910 | |
Fastest lap
| Rider | (Spain) Jorge Lorenzo | Yamaha |
| Time | 1:38.735 on lap 2 | |
Podium
| First | (Spain) Jorge Lorenzo | Yamaha |
| Second | (Spain) Marc Márquez | Honda |
| Third | (Italy) Valentino Rossi | Yamaha |

Moto2
Pole position
| Rider | (Spain) Tito Rabat | Kalex |
| Time | 1:42.874 | |
Fastest lap
| Rider | (Spain) Álex Rins | Kalex |
| Time | 1:43.012 on lap 3 | |
Podium
| First | (Germany) Jonas Folger | Kalex |
| Second | (France) Johann Zarco | Kalex |
| Third | (Spain) Tito Rabat | Kalex |

Moto3
Pole position
| Rider | (France) Fabio Quartararo | Honda |
| Time | 1:46.791 | |
Fastest lap
| Rider | (South Africa) Brad Binder | KTM |
| Time | 1:46.723 on lap 10 | |
Podium
| First | (United Kingdom) Danny Kent | Honda |
| Second | (Portugal) Miguel Oliveira | KTM |
| Third | (South Africa) Brad Binder | KTM |

The 2015 Spanish motorcycle Grand Prix was the fourth round of the 2015 Grand Prix motorcycle racing season. It was held at the Circuito de Jerez in Jerez de la Frontera on 3 May 2015.

In the premier class, Jorge Lorenzo took his first pole position since the 2014 San Marino Grand Prix, and ultimately his first victory at Circuito de Jerez since 2011. Marc Márquez, despite riding with a fractured finger on his left hand after a dirt-track accident a week before the race, finished in second while Valentino Rossi recorded his eighth successive podium finish – and the 200th of his Grand Prix career – with third place. Further down the order, Ducati's Andrea Dovizioso started from eighth on the grid, but he went off track on the second lap. After he fell to the rear of the field, Dovizioso was able to finish ninth, just behind Bradley Smith. Dovizioso's teammate, Andrea Iannone, had a good start position, third on the grid, but he fell to sixth place.

== Classification ==
=== MotoGP ===
| Pos. | No. | Rider | Team | Manufacturer | Laps | Time/Retired | Grid | Points |
|---|---|---|---|---|---|---|---|---|
| 1 | 99 | (Spain) Jorge Lorenzo | Movistar Yamaha MotoGP | Yamaha | 27 | 44:57.246 | 1 | 25 |
| 2 | 93 | (Spain) Marc Márquez | Repsol Honda Team | Honda | 27 | +5.576 | 2 | 20 |
| 3 | 46 | (Italy) Valentino Rossi | Movistar Yamaha MotoGP | Yamaha | 27 | +11.586 | 5 | 16 |
| 4 | 35 | (United Kingdom) Cal Crutchlow | CWM LCR Honda | Honda | 27 | +22.727 | 7 | 13 |
| 5 | 44 | (Spain) Pol Espargaró | Monster Yamaha Tech 3 | Yamaha | 27 | +26.620 | 4 | 11 |
| 6 | 29 | (Italy) Andrea Iannone | Ducati Team | Ducati | 27 | +27.021 | 3 | 10 |
| 7 | 41 | (Spain) Aleix Espargaró | Team Suzuki Ecstar | Suzuki | 27 | +35.445 | 6 | 9 |
| 8 | 38 | (United Kingdom) Bradley Smith | Monster Yamaha Tech 3 | Yamaha | 27 | +36.296 | 10 | 8 |
| 9 | 4 | (Italy) Andrea Dovizioso | Ducati Team | Ducati | 27 | +41.933 | 8 | 7 |
| 10 | 68 | (Colombia) Yonny Hernández | Pramac Racing | Ducati | 27 | +51.072 | 9 | 6 |
| 11 | 25 | (Spain) Maverick Viñales | Team Suzuki Ecstar | Suzuki | 27 | +51.674 | 14 | 5 |
| 12 | 9 | (Italy) Danilo Petrucci | Pramac Racing | Ducati | 27 | +52.421 | 11 | 4 |
| 13 | 45 | (United Kingdom) Scott Redding | EG 0,0 Marc VDS | Honda | 27 | +53.052 | 12 | 3 |
| 14 | 8 | (Spain) Héctor Barberá | Avintia Racing | Ducati | 27 | +53.200 | 13 | 2 |
| 15 | 19 | (Spain) Álvaro Bautista | Aprilia Racing Team Gresini | Aprilia | 27 | +57.344 | 15 | 1 |
| 16 | 6 | (Germany) Stefan Bradl | Athinà Forward Racing | Yamaha Forward | 27 | +59.018 | 19 | |
| 17 | 69 | (United States) Nicky Hayden | Aspar MotoGP Team | Honda | 27 | +1:01.506 | 18 | |
| 18 | 50 | (Republic of Ireland) Eugene Laverty | Aspar MotoGP Team | Honda | 27 | +1:03.163 | 17 | |
| 19 | 33 | (Italy) Marco Melandri | Aprilia Racing Team Gresini | Aprilia | 27 | +1:06.895 | 25 | |
| 20 | 43 | (Australia) Jack Miller | CWM LCR Honda | Honda | 27 | +1:14.182 | 22 | |
| 21 | 15 | (San Marino) Alex de Angelis | Octo IodaRacing Team | ART | 27 | +1:26.832 | 24 | |
| 22 | 63 | (France) Mike Di Meglio | Avintia Racing | Ducati | 26 | +1 lap | 23 | |
| Ret | 7 | (Japan) Hiroshi Aoyama | Repsol Honda Team | Honda | 14 | Accident | 16 | |
| Ret | 76 | (France) Loris Baz | Athinà Forward Racing | Yamaha Forward | 8 | Accident | 21 | |
| Ret | 17 | (Czech Republic) Karel Abraham | AB Motoracing | Honda | 3 | Accident | 20 | |

=== Moto2 ===
| Pos. | No. | Rider | Manufacturer | Laps | Time/Retired | Grid | Points |
|---|---|---|---|---|---|---|---|
| 1 | 94 | (Germany) Jonas Folger | Kalex | 26 | 45:01.873 | 3 | 25 |
| 2 | 5 | (France) Johann Zarco | Kalex | 26 | +1.931 | 9 | 20 |
| 3 | 1 | (Spain) Tito Rabat | Kalex | 26 | +2.222 | 1 | 16 |
| 4 | 12 | (Switzerland) Thomas Lüthi | Kalex | 26 | +6.833 | 4 | 13 |
| 5 | 19 | (Belgium) Xavier Siméon | Kalex | 26 | +11.086 | 10 | 11 |
| 6 | 21 | (Italy) Franco Morbidelli | Kalex | 26 | +12.479 | 14 | 10 |
| 7 | 39 | (Spain) Luis Salom | Kalex | 26 | +12.965 | 19 | 9 |
| 8 | 3 | (Italy) Simone Corsi | Kalex | 26 | +14.434 | 11 | 8 |
| 9 | 73 | (Spain) Álex Márquez | Kalex | 26 | +18.073 | 16 | 7 |
| 10 | 23 | (Germany) Marcel Schrötter | Tech 3 | 26 | +21.958 | 13 | 6 |
| 11 | 60 | (Spain) Julián Simón | Speed Up | 26 | +22.126 | 30 | 5 |
| 12 | 55 | (Malaysia) Hafizh Syahrin | Kalex | 26 | +25.339 | 20 | 4 |
| 13 | 7 | (Italy) Lorenzo Baldassarri | Kalex | 26 | +26.779 | 12 | 3 |
| 14 | 4 | (Switzerland) Randy Krummenacher | Kalex | 26 | +27.946 | 18 | 2 |
| 15 | 95 | (Australia) Anthony West | Speed Up | 26 | +30.873 | 23 | 1 |
| 16 | 77 | (Switzerland) Dominique Aegerter | Kalex | 26 | +34.026 | 15 | |
| 17 | 30 | (Japan) Takaaki Nakagami | Kalex | 26 | +34.105 | 5 | |
| 18 | 40 | (Spain) Álex Rins | Kalex | 26 | +35.568 | 2 | |
| 19 | 57 | (Spain) Edgar Pons | Kalex | 26 | +37.590 | 22 | |
| 20 | 22 | (United Kingdom) Sam Lowes | Speed Up | 26 | +41.011 | 6 | |
| 21 | 25 | (Malaysia) Azlan Shah | Kalex | 26 | +46.619 | 24 | |
| 22 | 10 | (Thailand) Thitipong Warokorn | Kalex | 26 | +47.743 | 25 | |
| 23 | 70 | (Switzerland) Robin Mulhauser | Kalex | 26 | +59.851 | 26 | |
| 24 | 66 | (Germany) Florian Alt | Suter | 26 | +1:11.461 | 27 | |
| 25 | 2 | (Switzerland) Jesko Raffin | Kalex | 26 | +1:11.513 | 28 | |
| 26 | 51 | (Malaysia) Zaqhwan Zaidi | Suter | 26 | +1:25.703 | 29 | |
| Ret | 36 | (Finland) Mika Kallio | Kalex | 22 | Retirement | 17 | |
| Ret | 11 | (Germany) Sandro Cortese | Kalex | 14 | Retirement | 7 | |
| Ret | 88 | (Spain) Ricard Cardús | Tech 3 | 12 | Accident | 21 | |
| Ret | 49 | (Spain) Axel Pons | Kalex | 5 | Accident | 8 | |
| DNS | 96 | (France) Louis Rossi | Tech 3 | | Did not start | | |
OFFICIAL MOTO2 REPORT

=== Moto3 ===
| Pos. | No. | Rider | Manufacturer | Laps | Time/Retired | Grid | Points |
|---|---|---|---|---|---|---|---|
| 1 | 52 | (United Kingdom) Danny Kent | Honda | 23 | 38:25.621 | 2 | 25 |
| 2 | 44 | (Portugal) Miguel Oliveira | KTM | 23 | +0.097 | 3 | 20 |
| 3 | 41 | (South Africa) Brad Binder | KTM | 23 | +0.296 | 4 | 16 |
| 4 | 20 | (France) Fabio Quartararo | Honda | 23 | +0.882 | 1 | 13 |
| 5 | 7 | (Spain) Efrén Vázquez | Honda | 23 | +2.906 | 17 | 11 |
| 6 | 5 | (Italy) Romano Fenati | KTM | 23 | +11.035 | 8 | 10 |
| 7 | 21 | (Italy) Francesco Bagnaia | Mahindra | 23 | +11.126 | 16 | 9 |
| 8 | 9 | (Spain) Jorge Navarro | Honda | 23 | +11.761 | 10 | 8 |
| 9 | 33 | (Italy) Enea Bastianini | Honda | 23 | +15.861 | 7 | 7 |
| 10 | 17 | (United Kingdom) John McPhee | Honda | 23 | +15.964 | 25 | 6 |
| 11 | 32 | (Spain) Isaac Viñales | Husqvarna | 23 | +16.015 | 13 | 5 |
| 12 | 95 | (France) Jules Danilo | Honda | 23 | +16.047 | 21 | 4 |
| 13 | 11 | (Belgium) Livio Loi | Honda | 23 | +18.800 | 22 | 3 |
| 14 | 88 | (Spain) Jorge Martín | Mahindra | 23 | +24.592 | 15 | 2 |
| 15 | 10 | (France) Alexis Masbou | Honda | 23 | +24.703 | 11 | 1 |
| 16 | 55 | (Italy) Andrea Locatelli | Honda | 23 | +25.985 | 23 | |
| 17 | 31 | (Finland) Niklas Ajo | KTM | 23 | +35.795 | 19 | |
| 18 | 12 | (Italy) Matteo Ferrari | Mahindra | 23 | +35.948 | 20 | |
| 19 | 29 | (Italy) Stefano Manzi | Mahindra | 23 | +36.363 | 33 | |
| 20 | 58 | (Spain) Juan Francisco Guevara | Mahindra | 23 | +36.498 | 18 | |
| 21 | 16 | (Italy) Andrea Migno | KTM | 23 | +36.532 | 27 | |
| 22 | 98 | (Czech Republic) Karel Hanika | KTM | 23 | +37.021 | 6 | |
| 23 | 24 | (Japan) Tatsuki Suzuki | Mahindra | 23 | +37.175 | 29 | |
| 24 | 40 | (South Africa) Darryn Binder | Mahindra | 23 | +37.318 | 28 | |
| 25 | 2 | (Australia) Remy Gardner | Mahindra | 23 | +40.942 | 26 | |
| 26 | 63 | (Malaysia) Zulfahmi Khairuddin | KTM | 23 | +53.592 | 30 | |
| 27 | 22 | (Spain) Ana Carrasco | KTM | 23 | +1:09.547 | 34 | |
| Ret | 65 | (Germany) Philipp Öttl | KTM | 18 | Retirement | 5 | |
| Ret | 84 | (Czech Republic) Jakub Kornfeil | KTM | 15 | Accident | 12 | |
| Ret | 76 | (Japan) Hiroki Ono | Honda | 15 | Accident | 14 | |
| Ret | 19 | (Italy) Alessandro Tonucci | Mahindra | 12 | Retirement | 31 | |
| Ret | 23 | (Italy) Niccolò Antonelli | Honda | 11 | Retirement | 9 | |
| Ret | 91 | (Argentina) Gabriel Rodrigo | KTM | 3 | Accident | 32 | |
| Ret | 6 | (Spain) María Herrera | Husqvarna | 2 | Accident | 24 | |
OFFICIAL MOTO3 REPORT

== Championship standings after the race (MotoGP) ==
Below are the standings for the top six riders and constructors after round four has concluded.

Riders' Championship standings

| Pos. | Rider | Points |
|---|---|---|
| 1 | (Italy) Valentino Rossi | 82 |
| 2 | (Italy) Andrea Dovizioso | 67 |
| 3 | (Spain) Jorge Lorenzo | 62 |
| 4 | (Spain) Marc Márquez | 56 |
| 5 | (Italy) Andrea Iannone | 50 |
| 6 | (United Kingdom) Cal Crutchlow | 47 |

Constructors' Championship standings

| Pos. | Constructor | Points |
|---|---|---|
| 1 | (Japan) Yamaha | 91 |
| 2 | (Japan) Honda | 72 |
| 3 | (Italy) Ducati | 70 |
| 4 | (Japan) Suzuki | 31 |
| 5 | (Switzerland) Yamaha Forward | 2 |
| 6 | (Italy) Aprilia | 2 |

Teams' Championship standings

| Pos. | Team | Points |
|---|---|---|
| 1 | (Japan) Movistar Yamaha MotoGP | 144 |
| 2 | (Italy) Ducati Team | 117 |
| 3 | (Japan) Repsol Honda Team | 71 |
| 4 | (France) Monster Yamaha Tech 3 | 62 |
| 5 | (Monaco) CWM LCR Honda | 53 |
| 6 | (Japan) Team Suzuki Ecstar | 51 |

- Note: Only the top six positions are included for both sets of standings.

| Previous race: 2015 Argentine Grand Prix | FIM Grand Prix World Championship; 2015 season | Next race: 2015 French Grand Prix |
| Previous race: 2014 Spanish Grand Prix | Spanish motorcycle Grand Prix | Next race: 2016 Spanish Grand Prix |
