= 2015 French motorcycle Grand Prix =

(France) 2015 French Grand Prix
Race details
- Race 5 of 18 races in the 2015 Grand Prix motorcycle racing season
- Date: 17 May 2015
- Official name: Monster Energy Grand Prix de France
- Location: Bugatti Circuit
- Course: Permanent racing facility; 4.185 km (2.600 mi)

MotoGP
Pole position
Rider	(Spain) Marc Márquez	Honda
Time	1:32.246	
Fastest lap
Rider	(Italy) Valentino Rossi	Yamaha
Time	1:32.879 on lap 4	
Podium
First	(Spain) Jorge Lorenzo	Yamaha
Second	(Italy) Valentino Rossi	Yamaha
Third	(Italy) Andrea Dovizioso	Ducati

Moto2
Pole position
Rider	(Spain) Álex Rins	Kalex
Time	1:37.114	
Fastest lap
Rider	(Switzerland) Thomas Lüthi	Kalex
Time	1:37.281 on lap 6	
Podium
First	(Switzerland) Thomas Lüthi	Kalex
Second	(Spain) Tito Rabat	Kalex
Third	(France) Johann Zarco	Kalex

Moto3
Pole position
Rider	(France) Fabio Quartararo	Honda
Time	1:44.763	
Fastest lap
Rider	(Italy) Enea Bastianini	Honda
Time	1:42.525 on lap 3	
Podium
First	(Italy) Romano Fenati	KTM
Second	(Italy) Enea Bastianini	Honda
Third	(Italy) Francesco Bagnaia	Mahindra

The 2015 French motorcycle Grand Prix was the fifth round of the 2015 Grand Prix motorcycle racing season. It was held at the Bugatti Circuit in Le Mans on 17 May 2015.

In the premier class, Marc Márquez took his third pole position of the season. However, it was Jorge Lorenzo who won his second consecutive race ahead of his teammate Valentino Rossi and Andrea Dovizioso completed the podium in third place. Fourth place was battled between Márquez, Andrea Iannone, and Bradley Smith, with Márquez eventually prevailing ahead of Iannone. Both Team LCR riders failed to finish the race; Cal Crutchlow crashed out at Turn 6 and Jack Miller crashed at the Dunlop chicane. Dani Pedrosa also crashed at the Dunlop chicane but remounted to finish in sixteenth.

In Moto3 Italian rider Francesco Bagnaia took his first ever podium, finishing the race in third place behind Romano Fenati and Enea Bastianini.

== Classification ==
=== MotoGP ===
Pos.	No.	Rider	Team	Manufacturer	Laps	Time/Retired	Grid	Points
1	99	(Spain) Jorge Lorenzo	Movistar Yamaha MotoGP	Yamaha	28	43:44.143	3	25
2	46	(Italy) Valentino Rossi	Movistar Yamaha MotoGP	Yamaha	28	+3.820	7	20
3	4	(Italy) Andrea Dovizioso	Ducati Team	Ducati	28	+12.380	2	16
4	93	(Spain) Marc Márquez	Repsol Honda Team	Honda	28	+19.890	1	13
5	29	(Italy) Andrea Iannone	Ducati Team	Ducati	28	+20.237	5	11
6	38	(United Kingdom) Bradley Smith	Monster Yamaha Tech 3	Yamaha	28	+21.145	6	10
7	44	(Spain) Pol Espargaró	Monster Yamaha Tech 3	Yamaha	28	+35.493	12	9
8	68	(Colombia) Yonny Hernández	Pramac Racing	Ducati	28	+39.601	11	8
9	25	(Spain) Maverick Viñales	Team Suzuki Ecstar	Suzuki	28	+41.571	13	7
10	9	(Italy) Danilo Petrucci	Pramac Racing	Ducati	28	+42.789	9	6
11	69	(United States) Nicky Hayden	Aspar MotoGP Team	Honda	28	+53.636	14	5
12	76	(France) Loris Baz	Athinà Forward Racing	Yamaha Forward	28	+1:00.617	22	4
13	8	(Spain) Héctor Barberá	Avintia Racing	Ducati	28	+1:04.272	19	3
14	50	(Republic of Ireland) Eugene Laverty	Aspar MotoGP Team	Honda	28	+1:05.259	21	2
15	19	(Spain) Álvaro Bautista	Aprilia Racing Team Gresini	Aprilia	28	+1:05.515	23	1
16	26	(Spain) Dani Pedrosa	Repsol Honda Team	Honda	28	+1:20.907	8	
17	15	(San Marino) Alex de Angelis	Octo IodaRacing Team	ART	28	+1:21.663	24	
18	33	(Italy) Marco Melandri	Aprilia Racing Team Gresini	Aprilia	27	+1 lap	25	
Ret	43	(Australia) Jack Miller	CWM LCR Honda	Honda	14	Accident	18	
Ret	17	(Czech Republic) Karel Abraham	AB Motoracing	Honda	14	Retirement	20	
Ret	35	(United Kingdom) Cal Crutchlow	CWM LCR Honda	Honda	7	Accident	4	
Ret	45	(United Kingdom) Scott Redding	EG 0,0 Marc VDS	Honda	3	Accident	15	
Ret	63	(France) Mike Di Meglio	Avintia Racing	Ducati	3	Retirement	17	
Ret	41	(Spain) Aleix Espargaró	Team Suzuki Ecstar	Suzuki	2	Retirement	10	
Ret	6	(Germany) Stefan Bradl	Athinà Forward Racing	Yamaha Forward	1	Accident	16	

=== Moto2 ===
Pos.	No.	Rider	Manufacturer	Laps	Time/Retired	Grid	Points
1	12	(Switzerland) Thomas Lüthi	Kalex	26	42:27.011	6	25
2	1	(Spain) Tito Rabat	Kalex	26	+1.767	4	20
3	5	(France) Johann Zarco	Kalex	26	+3.760	3	16
4	22	(United Kingdom) Sam Lowes	Speed Up	26	+4.076	2	13
5	21	(Italy) Franco Morbidelli	Kalex	26	+14.492	12	11
6	60	(Spain) Julián Simón	Speed Up	26	+14.681	9	10
7	30	(Japan) Takaaki Nakagami	Kalex	26	+14.845	5	9
8	19	(Belgium) Xavier Siméon	Kalex	26	+15.135	8	8
9	55	(Malaysia) Hafizh Syahrin	Kalex	26	+19.243	13	7
10	77	(Switzerland) Dominique Aegerter	Kalex	26	+19.531	19	6
11	95	(Australia) Anthony West	Speed Up	26	+29.478	17	5
12	4	(Switzerland) Randy Krummenacher	Kalex	26	+29.646	10	4
13	23	(Germany) Marcel Schrötter	Tech 3	26	+30.220	14	3
14	11	(Germany) Sandro Cortese	Kalex	26	+30.691	18	2
15	49	(Spain) Axel Pons	Kalex	26	+33.097	16	1
16	88	(Spain) Ricard Cardús	Tech 3	26	+33.604	25	
17	40	(Spain) Álex Rins	Kalex	26	+38.293	1	
18	3	(Italy) Simone Corsi	Kalex	26	+39.001	20	
19	25	(Malaysia) Azlan Shah	Kalex	26	+43.459	24	
20	70	(Switzerland) Robin Mulhauser	Kalex	26	+57.742	26	
21	7	(Italy) Lorenzo Baldassarri	Kalex	26	+1:09.399	22	
22	10	(Thailand) Thitipong Warokorn	Kalex	26	+1:17.247	25	
23	66	(Germany) Florian Alt	Suter	26	+1:17.646	28	
24	2	(Switzerland) Jesko Raffin	Kalex	26	+1:17.837	29	
25	51	(Malaysia) Zaqhwan Zaidi	Suter	26	+1:33.192	30	
26	20	(France) Louis Bulle	TransFIORmers	25	+1 lap	31	
Ret	39	(Spain) Luis Salom	Kalex	24	Accident	7	
Ret	36	(Finland) Mika Kallio	Kalex	12	Accident	11	
Ret	94	(Germany) Jonas Folger	Kalex	9	Accident	15	
Ret	96	(France) Louis Rossi	Tech 3	4	Accident	23	
Ret	73	(Spain) Álex Márquez	Kalex	4	Accident	21	
OFFICIAL MOTO2 REPORT

=== Moto3 ===
Pos.	No.	Rider	Manufacturer	Laps	Time/Retired	Grid	Points
1	5	(Italy) Romano Fenati	KTM	24	41:22.829	5	25
2	33	(Italy) Enea Bastianini	Honda	24	+0.122	18	20
3	21	(Italy) Francesco Bagnaia	Mahindra	24	+0.457	3	16
4	52	(United Kingdom) Danny Kent	Honda	24	+0.693	31	13
5	23	(Italy) Niccolò Antonelli	Honda	24	+2.244	7	11
6	84	(Czech Republic) Jakub Kornfeil	KTM	24	+2.421	4	10
7	32	(Spain) Isaac Viñales	Husqvarna	24	+2.587	9	9
8	44	(Portugal) Miguel Oliveira	KTM	24	+4.065	8	8
9	16	(Italy) Andrea Migno	KTM	24	+14.876	16	7
10	65	(Germany) Philipp Öttl	KTM	24	+22.588	33	6
11	76	(Japan) Hiroki Ono	Honda	24	+23.247	32	5
12	58	(Spain) Juan Francisco Guevara	Mahindra	24	+26.231	15	4
13	11	(Belgium) Livio Loi	Honda	24	+26.470	22	3
14	63	(Malaysia) Zulfahmi Khairuddin	KTM	24	+26.677	30	2
15	29	(Italy) Stefano Manzi	Mahindra	24	+26.841	14	1
16	55	(Italy) Andrea Locatelli	Honda	24	+28.484	13	
17	17	(United Kingdom) John McPhee	Honda	24	+33.193	19	
18	22	(Spain) Ana Carrasco	KTM	24	+38.979	28	
19	6	(Spain) María Herrera	Husqvarna	24	+39.450	11	
20	98	(Czech Republic) Karel Hanika	KTM	24	+58.182	24	
Ret	88	(Spain) Jorge Martín	Mahindra	23	Accident	34	
Ret	10	(France) Alexis Masbou	Honda	21	Accident	26	
Ret	31	(Finland) Niklas Ajo	KTM	21	Accident	20	
Ret	24	(Japan) Tatsuki Suzuki	Mahindra	19	Retirement	10	
Ret	20	(France) Fabio Quartararo	Honda	17	Accident	1	
Ret	12	(Italy) Matteo Ferrari	Mahindra	11	Accident	12	
Ret	95	(France) Jules Danilo	Honda	10	Accident	6	
Ret	40	(South Africa) Darryn Binder	Mahindra	9	Accident	27	
Ret	9	(Spain) Jorge Navarro	Honda	5	Accident	2	
Ret	19	(Italy) Alessandro Tonucci	Mahindra	2	Retirement	21	
Ret	2	(Australia) Remy Gardner	Mahindra	0	Retirement	17	
Ret	41	(South Africa) Brad Binder	KTM	0	Accident	25	
Ret	91	(Argentina) Gabriel Rodrigo	KTM	0	Accident	23	
Ret	7	(Spain) Efrén Vázquez	Honda	0	Accident	29	
OFFICIAL MOTO3 REPORT

== Championship standings after the race (MotoGP) ==
Below are the standings for the top six riders and constructors after round five has concluded.

Riders' Championship standings

Pos.	Rider	Points
1	(Italy) Valentino Rossi	102
2	(Spain) Jorge Lorenzo	87
3	(Italy) Andrea Dovizioso	83
4	(Spain) Marc Márquez	69
5	(Italy) Andrea Iannone	61
6	(United Kingdom) Cal Crutchlow	47

Constructors' Championship standings

Pos.	Constructor	Points
1	(Japan) Yamaha	116
2	(Italy) Ducati	86
3	(Japan) Honda	85
4	(Japan) Suzuki	38
5	(Switzerland) Yamaha Forward	6
6	(Italy) Aprilia	3

Teams' Championship standings

Pos.	Team	Points
1	(Japan) Movistar Yamaha MotoGP	189
2	(Italy) Ducati Team	144
3	(Japan) Repsol Honda Team	84
4	(France) Monster Yamaha Tech 3	81
5	(Japan) Team Suzuki Ecstar	58
6	(Monaco) CWM LCR Honda	53

- Note: Only the top six positions are included for both sets of standings.

Previous race: 2015 Spanish Grand Prix	FIM Grand Prix World Championship; 2015 season	Next race: 2015 Italian Grand Prix
Previous race: 2014 French Grand Prix	French motorcycle Grand Prix	Next race: 2016 French Grand Prix
