= 2015 Catalan motorcycle Grand Prix =

(Catalonia) 2015 Catalan Grand Prix
Race details
- Race 7 of 18 races in the 2015 Grand Prix motorcycle racing season
- Date: 14 June 2015
- Official name: Gran Premi Monster Energy de Catalunya
- Location: Circuit de Barcelona-Catalunya
- Course: Permanent racing facility; 4.727 km (2.937 mi)

MotoGP
Pole position
Rider	(Spain) Aleix Espargaró	Suzuki
Time	1:40.546	
Fastest lap
Rider	(Spain) Marc Márquez	Honda
Time	1:42.219 on lap 2	
Podium
First	(Spain) Jorge Lorenzo	Yamaha
Second	(Italy) Valentino Rossi	Yamaha
Third	(Spain) Dani Pedrosa	Honda

Moto2
Pole position
Rider	(France) Johann Zarco	Kalex
Time	1:45.895	
Fastest lap
Rider	(Spain) Álex Rins	Kalex
Time	1:46.474 on lap 2	
Podium
First	(France) Johann Zarco	Kalex
Second	(Spain) Álex Rins	Kalex
Third	(Spain) Tito Rabat	Kalex

Moto3
Pole position
Rider	(Italy) Enea Bastianini	Honda
Time	1:50.137	
Fastest lap
Rider	(Spain) Efrén Vázquez	Honda
Time	1:50.606 on lap 12	
Podium
First	(United Kingdom) Danny Kent	Honda
Second	(Italy) Enea Bastianini	Honda
Third	(Spain) Efrén Vázquez	Honda

The 2015 Catalan motorcycle Grand Prix was the seventh round of the 2015 Grand Prix motorcycle racing season. It was held at the Circuit de Barcelona-Catalunya in Montmeló on 14 June 2015.

In the MotoGP category, Suzuki's Aleix Espargaró took the manufacturer's first pole position since returning to MotoGP, but he crashed out of the race with 5 laps remaining. Jorge Lorenzo took his fourth win in succession, ahead of Valentino Rossi and Dani Pedrosa, who achieved his first podium of the season. Only 16 riders finished the race as amongst others, Marc Márquez, Andrea Dovizioso, Cal Crutchlow, Pol Espargaró, Yonny Hernández and Nicky Hayden retired from the race. Stefan Bradl took his first win in the Open category finishing in eighth place.

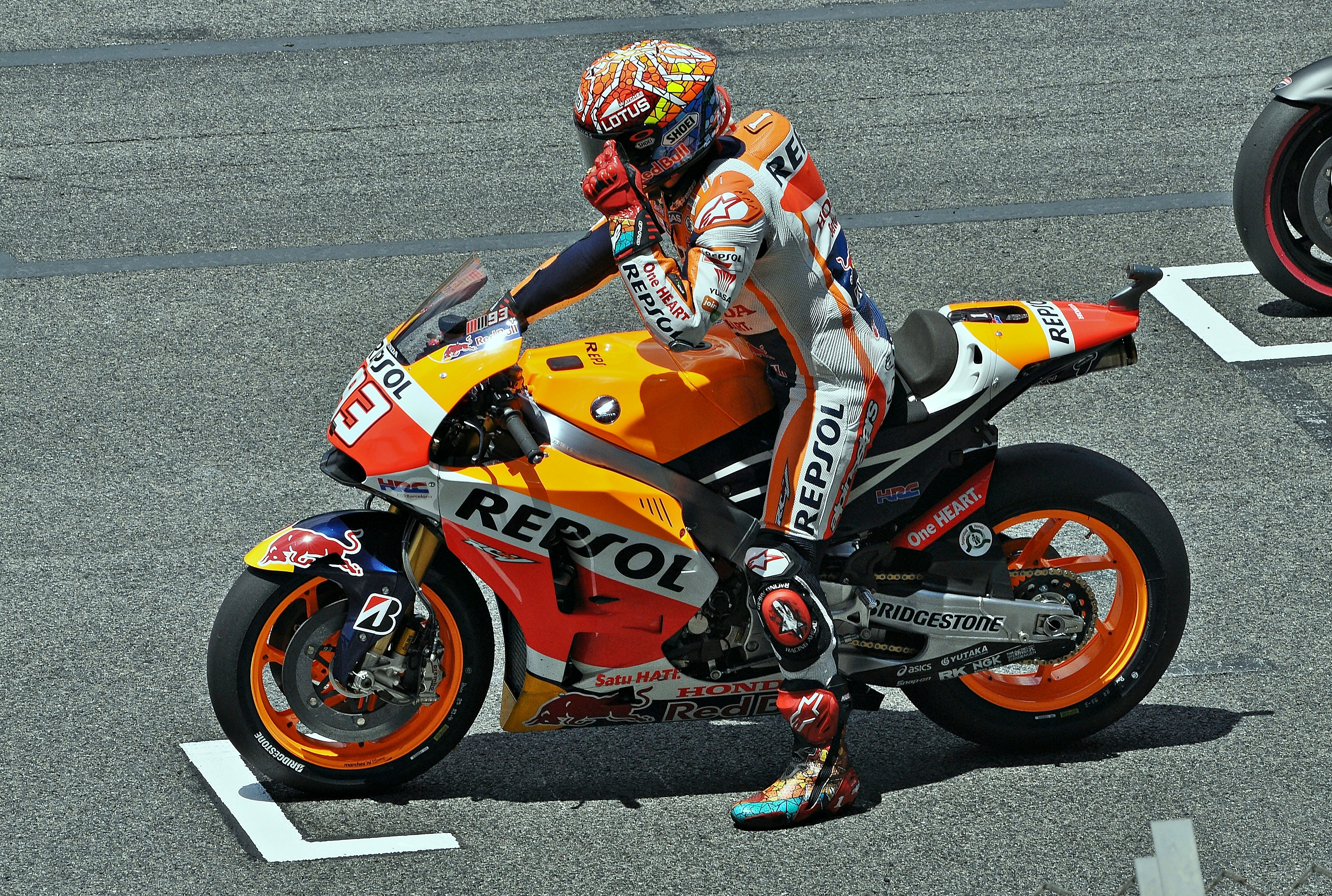
Marc Márquez before the start of the MotoGP race, which he went on to crash into the gravel trap at turn 10.

== Classification ==
=== MotoGP ===
Pos.	No.	Rider	Team	Manufacturer	Laps	Time/Retired	Grid	Points
1	99	(Spain) Jorge Lorenzo	Movistar Yamaha MotoGP	Yamaha	25	42:53.208	3	25
2	46	(Italy) Valentino Rossi	Movistar Yamaha MotoGP	Yamaha	25	+0.885	7	20
3	26	(Spain) Dani Pedrosa	Repsol Honda Team	Honda	25	+19.455	6	16
4	29	(Italy) Andrea Iannone	Ducati Team	Ducati	25	+24.925	12	13
5	38	(United Kingdom) Bradley Smith	Monster Yamaha Tech 3	Yamaha	25	+27.782	8	11
6	25	(Spain) Maverick Viñales	Team Suzuki Ecstar	Suzuki	25	+29.559	2	10
7	45	(United Kingdom) Scott Redding	EG 0,0 Marc VDS	Honda	25	+36.424	14	9
8	6	(Germany) Stefan Bradl	Athinà Forward Racing	Yamaha Forward	25	+42.103	15	8
9	9	(Italy) Danilo Petrucci	Octo Pramac Racing	Ducati	25	+49.350	16	7
10	19	(Spain) Álvaro Bautista	Aprilia Racing Team Gresini	Aprilia	25	+52.569	20	6
11	43	(Australia) Jack Miller	CWM LCR Honda	Honda	25	+53.666	21	5
12	50	(Republic of Ireland) Eugene Laverty	Aspar MotoGP Team	Honda	25	+55.765	22	4
13	76	(France) Loris Baz	Athinà Forward Racing	Yamaha Forward	25	+55.832	19	3
14	63	(France) Mike Di Meglio	Avintia Racing	Ducati	25	+1:09.037	17	2
15	15	(San Marino) Alex de Angelis	E-Motion IodaRacing Team	ART	25	+1:25.263	23	1
16	8	(Spain) Héctor Barberá	Avintia Racing	Ducati	24	+1 lap	13	
Ret	41	(Spain) Aleix Espargaró	Team Suzuki Ecstar	Suzuki	20	Accident	1	
Ret	69	(United States) Nicky Hayden	Aspar MotoGP Team	Honda	13	Accident	18	
Ret	33	(Italy) Marco Melandri	Aprilia Racing Team Gresini	Aprilia	6	Retirement	24	
Ret	4	(Italy) Andrea Dovizioso	Ducati Team	Ducati	6	Retirement	5	
Ret	44	(Spain) Pol Espargaró	Monster Yamaha Tech 3	Yamaha	4	Accident	11	
Ret	93	(Spain) Marc Márquez	Repsol Honda Team	Honda	3	Retirement	4	
Ret	35	(United Kingdom) Cal Crutchlow	CWM LCR Honda	Honda	3	Retirement	9	
Ret	68	(Colombia) Yonny Hernández	Octo Pramac Racing	Ducati	2	Accident	10	
DNS	17	(Czech Republic) Karel Abraham	AB Motoracing	Honda		Did not start		

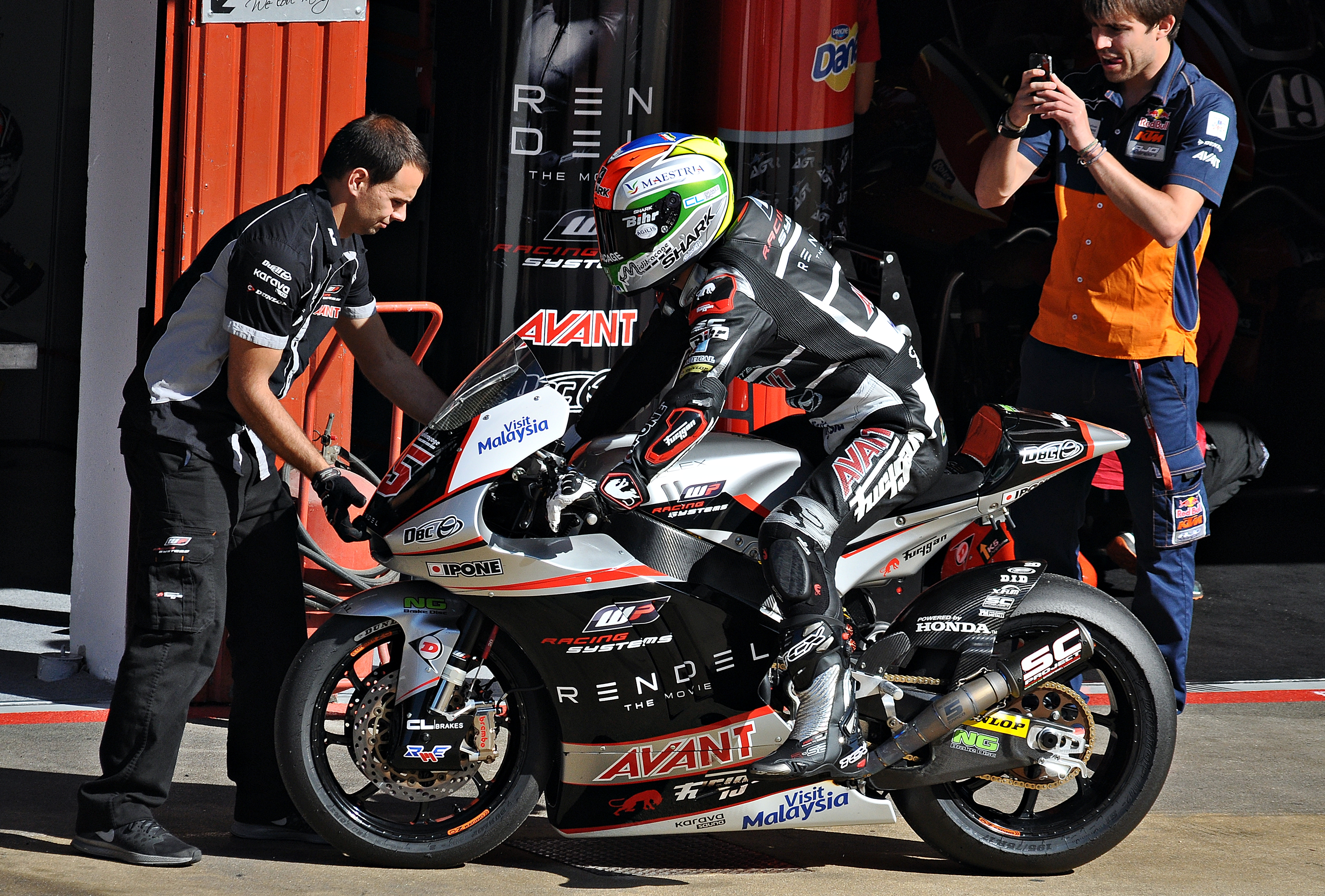
Johann Zarco before the start of the Moto2 race, which he went on to win.

=== Moto2 ===
Pos.	No.	Rider	Manufacturer	Laps	Time/Retired	Grid	Points
1	5	(France) Johann Zarco	Kalex	23	41:15.487	1	25
2	40	(Spain) Álex Rins	Kalex	23	+0.426	7	20
3	1	(Spain) Tito Rabat	Kalex	23	+1.115	3	16
4	22	(United Kingdom) Sam Lowes	Speed Up	23	+3.914	5	13
5	39	(Spain) Luis Salom	Kalex	23	+7.080	6	11
6	12	(Switzerland) Thomas Lüthi	Kalex	23	+7.383	10	10
7	94	(Germany) Jonas Folger	Kalex	23	+8.839	2	9
8	21	(Italy) Franco Morbidelli	Kalex	23	+10.352	23	8
9	77	(Switzerland) Dominique Aegerter	Kalex	23	+10.638	4	7
10	7	(Italy) Lorenzo Baldassarri	Kalex	23	+10.730	13	6
11	73	(Spain) Álex Márquez	Kalex	23	+11.052	12	5
12	36	(Finland) Mika Kallio	Kalex	23	+16.338	22	4
13	3	(Italy) Simone Corsi	Kalex	23	+16.649	8	3
14	55	(Malaysia) Hafizh Syahrin	Kalex	23	+19.584	19	2
15	60	(Spain) Julián Simón	Speed Up	23	+19.657	15	1
16	23	(Germany) Marcel Schrötter	Tech 3	23	+19.966	16	
17	57	(Spain) Edgar Pons	Kalex	23	+27.233	21	
18	4	(Switzerland) Randy Krummenacher	Kalex	23	+30.281	18	
19	25	(Malaysia) Azlan Shah	Kalex	23	+30.344	17	
20	30	(Japan) Takaaki Nakagami	Kalex	23	+39.906	25	
21	66	(Germany) Florian Alt	Suter	23	+43.463	28	
22	95	(Australia) Anthony West	Speed Up	23	+43.641	27	
23	96	(France) Louis Rossi	Tech 3	23	+44.849	26	
24	2	(Switzerland) Jesko Raffin	Kalex	23	+48.202	31	
25	10	(Thailand) Thitipong Warokorn	Kalex	23	+1:01.457	29	
26	93	(Malaysia) Ramdan Rosli	Kalex	23	+1:07.876	32	
Ret	88	(Spain) Ricard Cardús	Tech 3	17	Accident	30	
Ret	15	(Thailand) Ratthapark Wilairot	Suter	9	Accident	24	
Ret	70	(Switzerland) Robin Mulhauser	Kalex	7	Accident	20	
Ret	11	(Germany) Sandro Cortese	Kalex	0	Accident	9	
Ret	49	(Spain) Axel Pons	Kalex	0	Accident	11	
Ret	19	(Belgium) Xavier Siméon	Kalex	0	Accident	14	
OFFICIAL MOTO2 REPORT

=== Moto3 ===
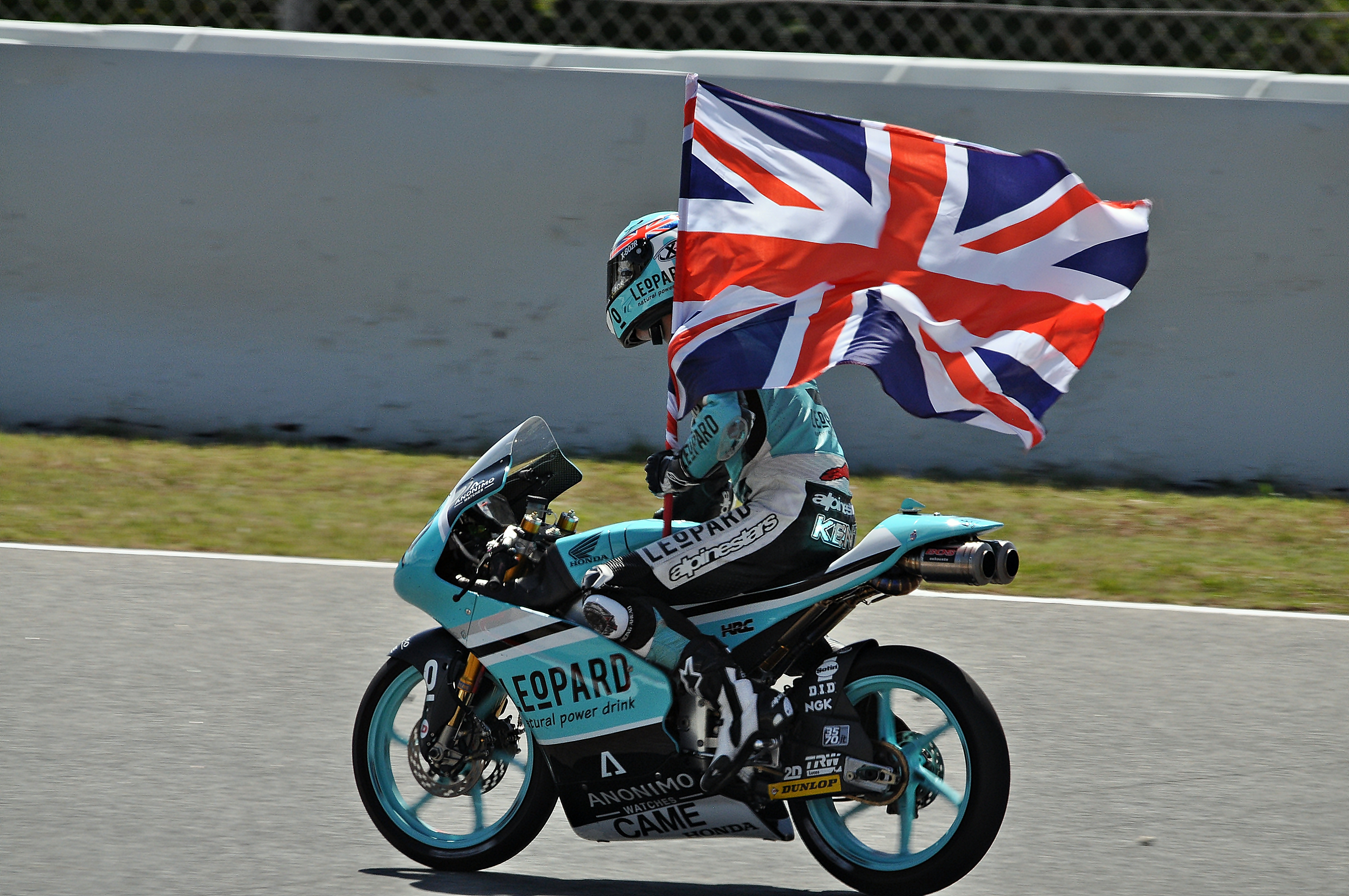
Danny Kent, waving the British flag after winning the Moto3 race.

Pos.	No.	Rider	Manufacturer	Laps	Time/Retired	Grid	Points
1	52	(United Kingdom) Danny Kent	Honda	22	40:59.419	2	25
2	33	(Italy) Enea Bastianini	Honda	22	+0.035	1	20
3	7	(Spain) Efrén Vázquez	Honda	22	+0.600	6	16
4	23	(Italy) Niccolò Antonelli	Honda	22	+0.687	4	13
5	44	(Portugal) Miguel Oliveira	KTM	22	+0.827	5	11
6	9	(Spain) Jorge Navarro	Honda	22	+0.913	3	10
7	32	(Spain) Isaac Viñales	Husqvarna	22	+8.871	20	9
8	5	(Italy) Romano Fenati	KTM	22	+8.917	13	8
9	41	(South Africa) Brad Binder	KTM	22	+11.068	18	7
10	65	(Germany) Philipp Öttl	KTM	22	+14.968	9	6
11	88	(Spain) Jorge Martín	Mahindra	22	+16.596	15	5
12	55	(Italy) Andrea Locatelli	Honda	22	+17.340	19	4
13	31	(Finland) Niklas Ajo	KTM	22	+19.086	8	3
14	20	(France) Fabio Quartararo	Honda	22	+19.320	7	2
15	6	(Spain) María Herrera	Husqvarna	22	+19.366	14	1
16	95	(France) Jules Danilo	Honda	22	+22.257	22	
17	19	(Italy) Alessandro Tonucci	Mahindra	22	+23.345	24	
18	10	(France) Alexis Masbou	Honda	22	+26.414	23	
19	11	(Belgium) Livio Loi	Honda	22	+27.080	29	
20	21	(Italy) Francesco Bagnaia	Mahindra	22	+36.956	17	
21	12	(Italy) Matteo Ferrari	Mahindra	22	+37.895	31	
22	24	(Japan) Tatsuki Suzuki	Mahindra	22	+37.946	28	
23	22	(Spain) Ana Carrasco	KTM	22	+38.088	34	
24	63	(Malaysia) Zulfahmi Khairuddin	KTM	22	+53.346	33	
25	2	(Australia) Remy Gardner	Mahindra	22	+1:02.762	25	
26	58	(Spain) Juan Francisco Guevara	Mahindra	22	+1:16.487	16	
27	29	(Italy) Stefano Manzi	Mahindra	21	+1 lap	27	
28	16	(Italy) Andrea Migno	KTM	21	+1 lap	21	
Ret	98	(Czech Republic) Karel Hanika	KTM	19	Accident	12	
Ret	40	(South Africa) Darryn Binder	Mahindra	17	Retirement	30	
Ret	17	(United Kingdom) John McPhee	Honda	9	Accident	11	
Ret	76	(Japan) Hiroki Ono	Honda	6	Accident	10	
Ret	84	(Czech Republic) Jakub Kornfeil	KTM	0	Accident	26	
Ret	91	(Argentina) Gabriel Rodrigo	KTM	0	Accident	32	
OFFICIAL MOTO3 REPORT

== Championship standings after the race (MotoGP) ==
Below are the standings for the top five riders and constructors after round seven has concluded.

Riders' Championship standings

Pos.	Rider	Points
1	(Italy) Valentino Rossi	138
2	(Spain) Jorge Lorenzo	137
3	(Italy) Andrea Iannone	94
4	(Italy) Andrea Dovizioso	83
5	(Spain) Marc Márquez	69

Constructors' Championship standings

Pos.	Constructor	Points
1	(Japan) Yamaha	166
2	(Italy) Ducati	119
3	(Japan) Honda	114
4	(Japan) Suzuki	57
5	(Switzerland) Yamaha Forward	18

- Note: Only the top five positions are included for both sets of standings.

Previous race: 2015 Italian Grand Prix	FIM Grand Prix World Championship; 2015 season	Next race: 2015 Dutch TT
Previous race: 2014 Catalan Grand Prix	Catalan motorcycle Grand Prix	Next race: 2016 Catalan Grand Prix
