= Mamola =

Mamola is a surname. Notable people with the surname include:

- Dakota Mamola (born 1994), Belgian motorcycle racer
- Randy Mamola (born 1959), American motorcycle racer
