= Danny Kent =

British motorcycle racer (born 1993)

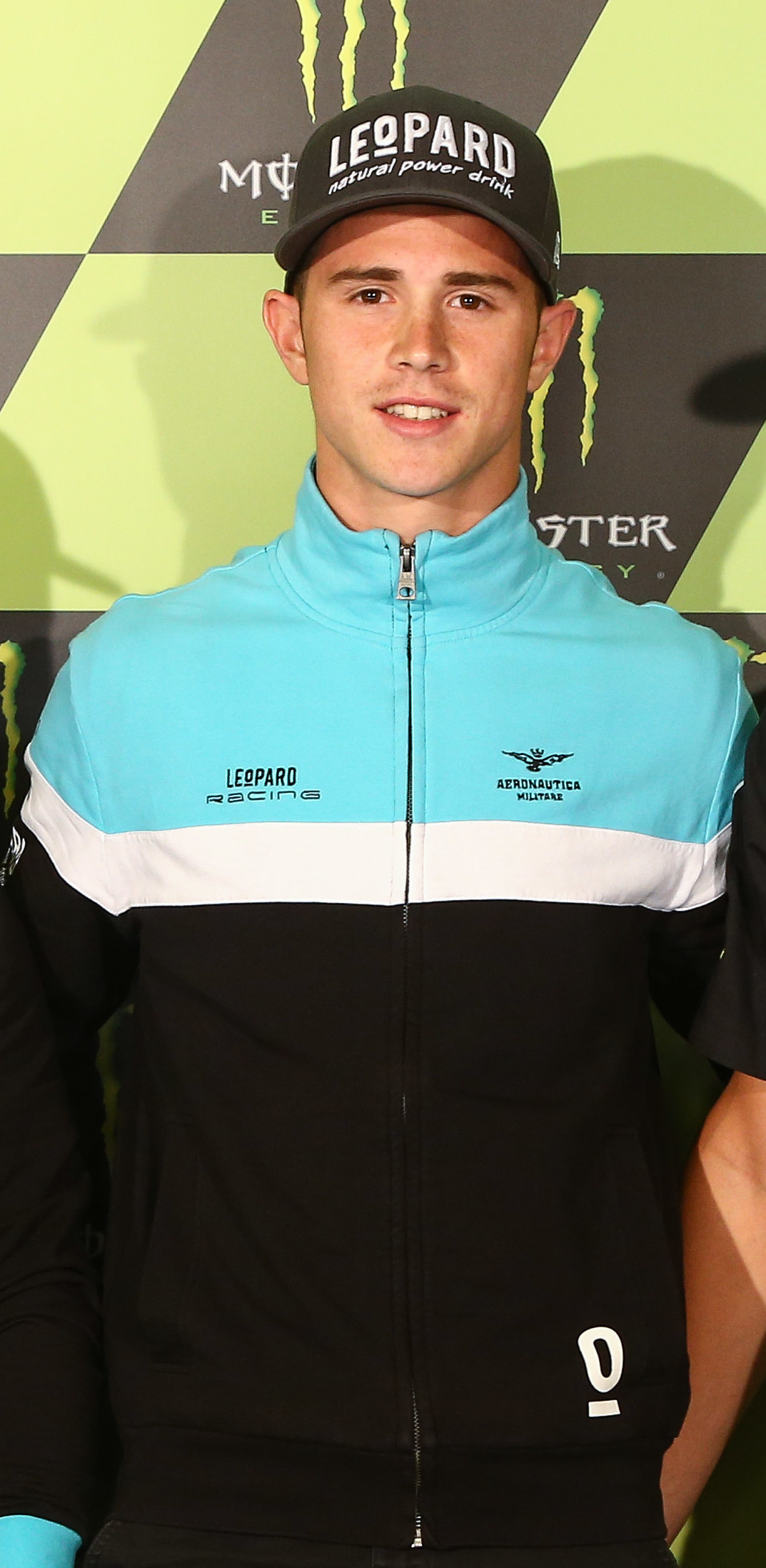
- Kent in 2015
- Nationality: British
- Born: 25 November 1993 (age 32); Chippenham, Wiltshire, England
- Current team: Cheshire Mouldings Yamaha
- Bike number: 52
- Website: dannykent52.com
Motorcycle racing career statistics
Moto2 World Championship
Active years	2013, 2016–2018
Manufacturers	Tech 3, Kalex, Suter, Speed Up
Championships	0
2018 championship position	25th (8 pts)
Starts / Wins / Podiums / Poles / F. laps / Points; 48 / 0 / 0 / 0 / 0 / 62
Moto3 World Championship
Active years	2012, 2014–2015, 2017
Manufacturers	KTM, Husqvarna, Honda
Championships	1 (2015)
2017 championship position	32nd (6 pts)
Starts / Wins / Podiums / Poles / F. laps / Points; 55 / 8 / 14 / 7 / 4 / 549
125cc World Championship
Active years	2010–2011
Manufacturers	Aprilia, Honda, Lambretta
Championships	0
2011 championship position	11th (82 pts)
Starts / Wins / Podiums / Poles / F. laps / Points; 23 / 0 / 0 / 0 / 0 / 82
British Superbike Championship
Active years	2018–2019, 2021–present
Manufacturers	Suzuki, MV Agusta, Honda, Yamaha
Championships	0
2026 championship position	9th (211 points)
Starts / Wins / Podiums / Poles / F. laps / Points; 159 / 4 / 19 / 3 / 3 / 864

Danny Ray Kent (born 25 November 1993) is an English motorcycle racer, competing in the British Superbike Championship for TAS Racing onboard a Yamaha. He is best known for winning the 2015 Moto3 World Championship. In doing so, Kent became Great Britain's first Grand Prix solo motorcycle world champion since Barry Sheene in 1977, as well as the first British lightweight class champion since Dave Simmonds in 1969.

In 2020, Kent competed in the British National Superstock 1000 Championship, aboard a Kawasaki ZX-10R, finishing the year sixth in the final standings. From 2021 onwards he has been racing in the British Superbike Championship, first aboard a Suzuki GSX-R1000R, continuing with Buildbase Suzuki in 2022 as well, then joining Honda for 2023. For 2024, Kent moved to Yamaha with the McAMS outfit, and won his first British Superbike race at the final round of the 2024 season. He re-signed with the team for the 2025 season.

== Career ==
=== Early career ===
Born in Chippenham, Wiltshire, Kent like many others started out in Minimoto, before moving into the FAB-Racing MiniGP50 and MiniGP70 British Championships. Kent progressed through the Aprilia Superteens Championship earning success before being selected for the Red Bull MotoGP Academy and racing in Spain in the Spanish 125GP Championship. When the Academy closed Kent was switched to the Red Bull MotoGP Rookies Cup, where he finished runner-up in 2010. Kent also contested a wild card ride at Silverstone in 2010 aboard a 125cc Honda, earning him a late ride with Lambretta in the 125cc Grand Prix world championship that year.

=== 125cc/Moto3 World Championship ===
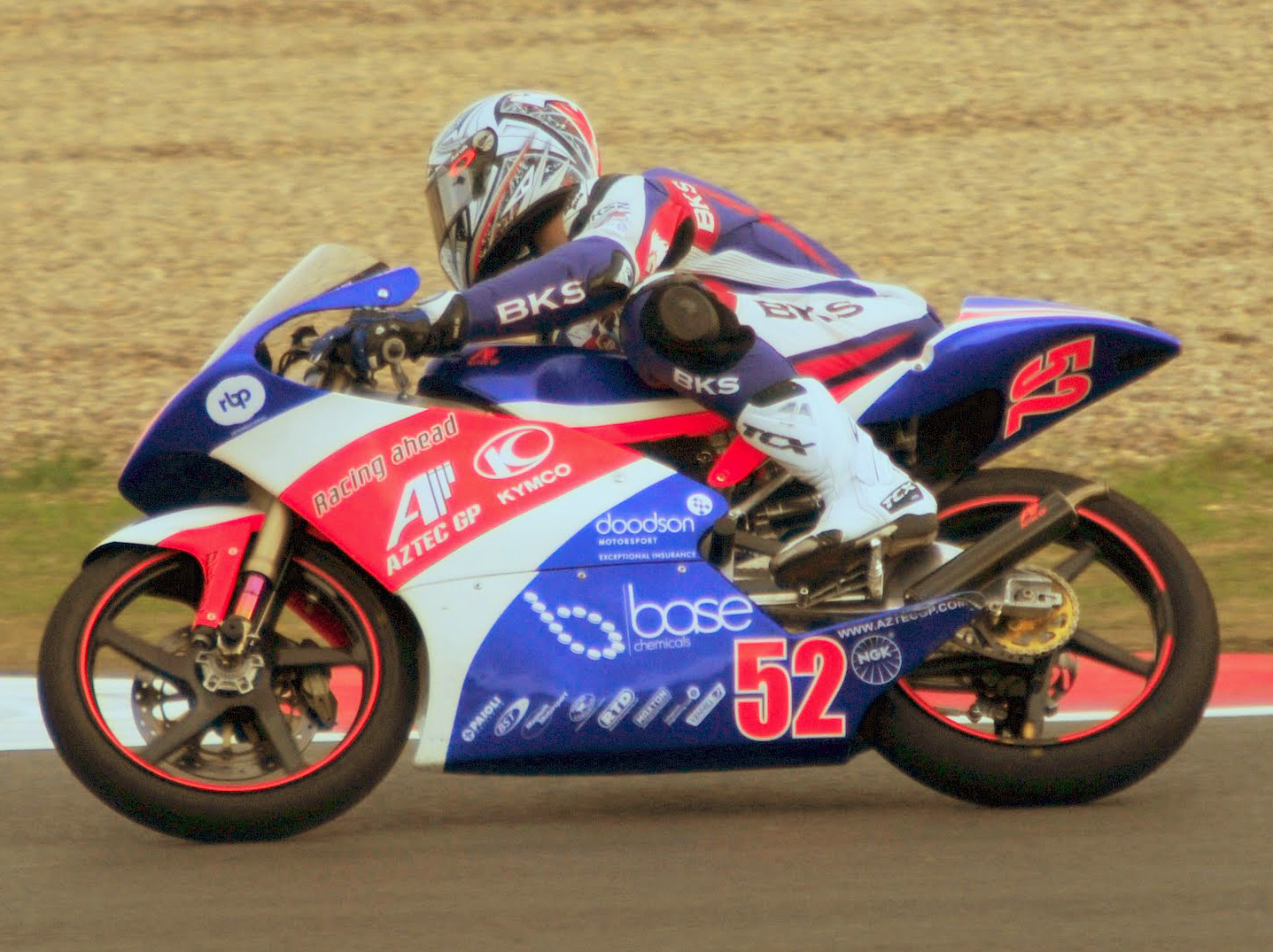
Kent at the 2010 British Grand Prix

Kent entered the 125cc world championship with Lambretta in 2010 at the Japanese Grand Prix at Motegi, qualifying in 16th place, a big improvement on 29th in which he qualified for the British round earlier that year – however he retired from the race. He took a best qualifying position of tenth at the Portuguese Grand Prix in Estoril and a best and only race finish of 21st at Phillip island during the Australian Grand Prix.

For 2011, Kent switched to the Red Bull Ajo Aprilia team to compete in his first full season in the 125cc world championship. Kent enjoyed a successful first season scoring 82 points with a best finish of fourth place, on the way to 11th in the championship standings.

2012 was the start of the Moto3 class. The new formula would use four-stroke 250cc engines apposed to the two-stroke 125cc engines of the class it was replacing. Kent remained with the Red Bull Ajo team however the team switched to running KTM motorcycles spearheading the factory's assault on the title. The team had a fantastic year with Kent's teammate Sandro Cortese taking the world championship along with Kent himself taking fourth in the championship. Kent earned his first podium at Assen in the Dutch TT, and he took his first win at the Japanese Grand Prix at Twin Ring Motegi with a great last lap result. He followed up in similar fashion just four rounds later at the final Grand Prix of the season in Valencia with a brave last corner overtake on Cortese earning him his second Grand Prix victory.

=== Moto2 World Championship ===
For 2013, Kent raced with Tech 3 in the Moto2 category alongside fellow Moto3 graduate Louis Rossi. Kent's season started with a run to 18th place in Qatar, he scored his first points at round six with a 13th-place finish in Catalunya. Kent scored points on four more occasions with a best of 12th at both the Czech and Malaysian races, and had a strong end to season with three consecutive point-scoring finishes before breaking his collarbone in the warm-up for the Japanese Grand Prix, ruling him out for the rest of the season.

=== Return to Moto3 ===
Having been originally announced to remain in Moto2 with Tech 3, Kent returned to Moto3 for 2014; he competed with the Ajo Motorsport team, riding a Husqvarna-branded KTM.

For 2015, Kent moved to the Leopard sponsored Kiefer Racing squad, running Hondas. Kent's season started off well, reaching the podium at the first race in Qatar and taking his first win for Leopard in the following race at the Circuit of the Americas. Kent won the next two races – the first British rider to win successive races in the lightweight class since Barry Sheene in 1971 – in Argentina and at Jerez to open up a championship lead. He added further victories in Catalunya, the Sachsenring and his home event at Silverstone.

Kent led the championship by 24 points ahead of Miguel Oliveira, with one race remaining. Despite Oliveira winning the final race in Valencia, a ninth-place finish was enough for Kent to claim the championship and become Great Britain's first Grand Prix motorcycle world champion since Barry Sheene in 1977.

=== Return to Moto2 ===
On 27 September 2015, it was announced that Kent would be moving up to the Moto2 class for the 2016 season, with his Leopard Racing team. He was joined in the team by his Moto3 championship rival Miguel Oliveira.

Kent walked out on his team after just three races into the season, and was without a ride for much of the remainder, with a wildcard ride in Moto3 and acting as an occasional replacement for injured riders in Moto2, before signing with a new team Speed Up Racing in Moto2 for the 2018 season.

Kent was sacked by Speed Up in late September 2018, with five races remaining, due to poor performances and refusing to follow team orders. In a statement to motogp.com, team boss Luca Boscoscuro was highly critical of Kent, stating “that behaviour doesn’t work. I’m sorry, but not with me”.

=== British Superbike Championship ===
Kent secured an entry riding Halsall Racing's Suzuki GSX-R1000 for the Brands Hatch final round of the 2018 British Superbike Championship in October after a successful test. He failed to finish in two races, but finished in 12th from 15 finishers in race three. The team subsequently folded after principal Martin Halsall withdrew funding.

In late May 2019, it was announced that Kent would ride in British Superbikes on an ex-Leon Camier 2016 MV Agusta F4, starting from the July event at Snetterton. Kent failed to finish a race at Snetterton, but achieved 18th place in BSB race 2 at Thruxton in August. His employment was terminated by his team in mid-August due to a court conviction.

Kent joined Buildbase Suzuki, continuing into 2022. A practice crash at the Donington Park third-round in May 2022 caused hospitalisation with no participation in the races.

== Personal life ==
Kent became part of the Phil Burgan Race Academy (PBRA) – a programme for developing British talent in motorcycle sport, under the guidance of James Toseland. The aim of the programme is to provide support, both financial and consultative, to promising British motorcycle racers and teams of the future.

In August 2019, Kent received a four-month suspended prison sentence for carrying a knife in a public place during an altercation in March, 2019. This resulted in his superbike team terminating his contract, with Gino Rea named as interim replacement.

== Career statistics ==
=== Career highlights ===
- **2001** – Welsh Minimoto – Debut and first win.
- **2004** – FAB-Racing MiniGP50 British Championship (2nd overall)
- **2005** – FAB-Racing MiniGP70 British Championship (1st overall)
- **2007** – British Aprilia Superteens Championship.
- **2008** – Invited into Red Bull MotoGP Academy and contested Spanish CEV 125GP (9th overall)
- **2009** – Academy closed – transferred to the Red Bull MotoGP Rookies Cup (4th overall, 1 win)
- **2010** – Red Bull MotoGP Rookies Cup (2nd overall, 2 wins)
- **2015** – Moto3 World Champion (6 wins)

=== British 125 Championship ===
Year	Bike	1	2	3	4	5	6	7	8	9	10	11	12	13	Pos	Pts
2009	Honda	BHI	OUL	DON	THR	SNE	KNO	MAL	BHGP	CAD	CRO; Ret	SIL; Ret	OUL; Ret		**25th**	**11**
2010	Honda	BRH; 5	THR	OUL; 9	CAD; Ret	MAL	KNO; C	SNE	BRH; 7	CAD	CRO	CRO; WD	SIL	OUL	**23rd**	**27**

=== Red Bull MotoGP Rookies Cup ===
==== Races by year ====
(key) (Races in bold indicate pole position, races in italics indicate fastest lap)

Year	1	2	3	4	5	6	7	8	9	10	Pos	Pts
2009	SPA1; 3	SPA2; 1	ITA; 7	NED; Ret	**GER**; 6	**GBR**; 8	CZE1; 2	CZE2; 8			4th	96
2010	SPA1; 1	SPA2; 2	ITA; 4	NED1; 11	NED2; 2	GER1; 3	GER2; 12	CZE1; 3	CZE2; 2	**RSM**; 1	2nd	164

=== Grand Prix motorcycle racing ===
==== By season ====
Season	Class	Motorcycle	Team	Race	Win	Podium	Pole	FLap	Pts	Plcd	WCh
2010	125cc	Honda	Aztec Grand Prix	1	0	0	0	0	0	NC	–
2010	125cc	Lambretta	Lambretta Reparto Corse	5	0	0	0	0	0	NC	–
2011	125cc	Aprilia	Red Bull Ajo Motorsport	17	0	0	0	0	82	11th	–
2012	Moto3	KTM	Red Bull KTM Ajo	17	2	3	1	1	154	4th	–
2013	Moto2	Tech 3	Tech 3	15	0	0	0	0	16	22nd	–
2014	Moto3	Husqvarna	Red Bull Husqvarna Ajo	18	0	2	1	0	129	8th	–
2015	Moto3	Honda	Leopard Racing	18	6	9	5	3	260	**1st**	1
2016	Moto2	Kalex	Leopard Racing	17	0	0	0	0	35	22nd	–
2017	Moto2	Suter	Kiefer Racing	3	0	0	0	0	3	33rd	–
2017	Moto2	Suter	Dynavolt Intact GP	0	0	0	0	0	3	33rd	–
2017	Moto2	Kalex	CarXpert Interwetten	1	0	0	0	0	3	33rd	–
2017	Moto3	KTM	Red Bull KTM Ajo	2	0	0	0	0	6	32nd	–
2018	Moto2	Speed Up	Speed Up Racing	13	0	0	0	0	8	25th	–
Total				**126**	**8**	**14**	**7**	**4**	**693**		1

==== By class ====
Class	Seasons	1st GP	1st pod	1st win	Race	Win	Podiums	Pole	FLap	Pts	WChmp
125cc	2010–2011	2010 Great Britain			23	0	0	0	0	82	0
Moto3	2012, 2014–2015, 2017	2012 Qatar	2012 Netherlands	2012 Japan	55	8	14	7	4	549	1
Moto2	2013, 2016–2018	2013 Qatar			48	0	0	0	0	62	0
Total	2010–2018				**126**	**8**	**14**	**7**	**4**	**693**	**1**

==== Races by year ====
(key) (Races in bold indicate pole position; races in italics indicate fastest lap)

Year	Class	Bike	1	2	3	4	5	6	7	8	9	10	11	12	13	14	15	16	17	18	19	Pos	Pts
2010	125cc	Honda	QAT	SPA	FRA	ITA	GBR; Ret	NED	CAT	GER	CZE	INP	RSM	ARA								NC	0
2010	125cc	Lambretta													JPN; Ret	MAL; Ret	AUS; 21	POR; NC	VAL; Ret			NC	0
2011	125cc	Aprilia	QAT; 13	SPA; 4	POR; 15	FRA; 17	CAT; 11	GBR; 10	NED; 6	ITA; 15	GER; 9	CZE; Ret	INP; 13	RSM; 6	ARA; 6	JPN; 9	AUS; 22	MAL; 10	VAL; 17			11th	82
2012	Moto3	KTM	QAT; 8	SPA; Ret	POR; 8	FRA; Ret	CAT; 20	GBR; 6	NED; 3	GER; Ret	ITA; 5	INP; 12	CZE; 7	RSM; 12	ARA; 4	**JPN**; 1	MAL; 6	AUS; 5	VAL; 1			4th	154
2013	Moto2	Tech 3	QAT; 18	AME; 17	SPA; 26	FRA; 15	ITA; 21	CAT; 13	NED; 19	GER; Ret	INP; 22	CZE; 12	GBR; 18	RSM; 18	ARA; 15	MAL; 12	AUS; 13	JPN; DNS	VAL			22nd	16
2014	Moto3	Husqvarna	QAT; 13	AME; 8	ARG; 9	SPA; 11	FRA; 13	ITA; 15	CAT; 17	NED; 8	GER; 5	INP; 12	CZE; 3	GBR; 9	RSM; 12	ARA; 3	**JPN**; 6	AUS; 20	MAL; 4	VAL; 4		8th	129
2015	Moto3	Honda	QAT; 3	**AME**; 1	ARG; 1	SPA; 1	FRA; 4	**ITA**; 2	CAT; 1	NED; 3	**GER**; 1	**INP**; 21	CZE; 7	GBR; 1	RSM; 6	ARA; Ret	JPN; 6	**AUS**; Ret	MAL; 7	VAL; 9		1st	260
2016	Moto2	Kalex	QAT; 6	ARG; 16	AME; Ret	SPA; Ret	FRA; 19	ITA; 14	CAT; Ret	NED; 14	GER; DNS	AUT; 12	CZE; 7	GBR; 15	RSM; Ret	ARA; 29	JPN; Ret	AUS; Ret	MAL; 18	VAL; 9		22nd	35
2017	Moto2	Suter	QAT; 13	ARG; Ret	AME; DNS	SPA							AUT; DNS	GBR	RSM	ARA	JPN	AUS	MAL	VAL		33rd	3
2017	Moto2	Kalex						ITA; Ret	CAT	NED												33rd	3
2017	Moto3	KTM					FRA; 10				GER; Ret	CZE										32nd	6
2018	Moto2	Speed Up	QAT; 17	ARG; 12	AME; Ret	SPA; Ret	FRA; 21	ITA; Ret	CAT; 21	NED; Ret	GER; Ret	CZE; Ret	AUT; 12	GBR; C	RSM; Ret	ARA; Ret	THA	JPN	AUS	MAL	VAL	25th	8

=== British Superbike Championship ===
==== By year ====
Year	Bike	1			2			3			4			5			6			7			8				9			10			11			12			Pos	Pts
Year	Bike	R1	R2	R3	R1	R2	R3	R1	R2	R3	R1	R2	R3	R1	R2	R3	R1	R2	R3	R1	R2	R3	R1	R2	R3	R4	R1	R2	R3	R1	R2	R3	R1	R2	R3	R1	R2	R3	Pos	Pts
2018	Suzuki	DON	DON		BRH	BRH		OUL	OUL		SNE	SNE		KNO	KNO		BRH	BRH		THR	THR		CAD	CAD			SIL	SIL	SIL	OUL	OUL		ASS	ASS		BRH; Ret	BRH; Ret	BRH; 12	30th	4
2019	MV Agusta	SIL	SIL		OUL	OUL		DON	DON	DON	BRH	BRH		KNO	KNO		SNE; Ret	SNE; DNS		THR; Ret	THR; 18		CAD	CAD			OUL	OUL	OUL	ASS	ASS		DON	DON		BRH	BRH	BRH	NC	0
2021	Suzuki	OUL; Ret	OUL; 14	OUL; Ret	KNO; Ret	KNO; Ret	KNO; 14	BRH; 10	BRH; Ret	BRH; 10	THR; 6	THR; 9	THR; 3	DON; 16	DON; Ret	DON; DNS	CAD	CAD	CAD	SNE	SNE	SNE	SIL	SIL	SIL		OUL	OUL	OUL	DON	DON	DON	BRH	BRH	BRH				18th	49
2022	Suzuki	SIL; 17	SIL; 18	SIL; 15	OUL; 21	OUL; 19	OUL; Ret	DON; DNS	DON; DNS	DON; DNS	KNO; 19	KNO; 14	KNO; Ret	BRH; 12	BRH; 9	BRH; Ret	THR; Ret	THR; 22	THR; 15	CAD; 15	CAD; 16	CAD; 14	SNE; 10	SNE; Ret	SNE; 12		OUL; 12	OUL; 12	OUL; 10	DON; 17	DON; 14	DON; 9	BRH; 8	BRH; 6	BRH; 8				16th	77
2023	Honda	SIL; 9	SIL; 8	SIL; 5	OUL; 15	OUL; 11	OUL; Ret	DON; 8	DON; Ret	DON; Ret	KNO; 17	KNO; Ret	KNO; DNS	SNE; 6	SNE; 6	SNE; 9	BRH; 2	BRH; 3	BRH; 5	THR; 7	THR; 10	THR; Ret	CAD	CAD	CAD		OUL	OUL	OUL	DON	DON	DON	BRH	BRH	BRH				14th	115
2024	Yamaha	**NAV**; 3	NAV; 2		OUL; 6	OUL; 4	OUL; 4	DON; 4	DON; 4	**DON**; 3	KNO; 7	KNO; Ret	**KNO**; 3	SNE; Ret	SNE; 6	SNE; 4	BRH; Ret	BRH; DNS	BRH; 15	THR; Ret	THR; 3	THR; 2	CAD; 14	CAD; Ret	CAD; 12		OUL; 7	OUL; 2	OUL; 5	DON; 5	DON; 4	DON; 2	BRH; 1	**BRH**; 4	BRH; 4				4th	373
2025	Yamaha	OUL; 10	OUL; 6	OUL; C	DON; 10	DON; 11	DON; 8	SNE; 6	SNE; 13	SNE; 7	KNO; 12	KNO; 4	KNO; 12	BRH; 5	BRH; 3	BRH; 2	THR; 2	THR; 1	THR; 1	CAD; Ret	CAD; 9	CAD; 11	DON; 4	DON; 10	DON; Ret	DON; DNS	ASS; 3	ASS; 13	ASS; 12	OUL	OUL	OUL	BRH; 5	BRH; 4	BRH; 1				6th	298
2026	Yamaha	OUL; 16	OUL; 14	OUL; 12	DON; 9	DON; 10	DON; 10	KNO; 11	KNO; 9	KNO; DNS	SNE; 11	SNE; 7	SNE; 11	BRH; 12	BRH; 11	BRH; 9	OUL; 14	OUL; DNS	OUL; Ret	THR; 8	THR; 7	THR; 6	CAD; 8	CAD; 10	CAD; 13		ASS; 9	ASS; 13	ASS; 8	DON; 7	DON; 9	DON; 7	BRH; 9	BRH; 10	BRH; 9				9th	211
