= Keith Farmer =

Northern Irish motorcycle racer (1987–2022)

Keith Farmer.
- Born: 5 February 1987; Clogher, Northern Ireland
- Died: 10 November 2022 (aged 35); Carlisle, Cumbria, England
- Occupation: Motorcycle racer

Keith Farmer (2 February 1987 – 10 November 2022) was a Northern Irish motorcycle racer. A four-time national champion, he was described as "one of Northern Ireland's most successful motorcyclists".

Farmer retired in 2021 after receiving injuries in accidents. He died suddenly on 10 November 2022, at the age of 35.

== Personal life ==
Farmer was born on 5 February 1987 in Clogher, County Tyrone.

On 4 November 2022, Farmer was found unresponsive and was taken to the Cumberland Infirmary where he died on 10 November.

== Racing background ==
Farmer became 2011 National Superstock 600 champion and National Superstock 1000 champion in 2012 and 2018. He also won 2017 British Supersport Championship. Farmer was a member of prominent BSB teams, including the Paul Bird Motorsport team, Buildbase Suzuki and TAS Racing.

== Career statistics ==
=== National Superstock 600 Championship ===
Year	Bike	1	2	3	4	5	6	7	8	9	10	11	12	13	Pos	Pts
2011	Yamaha	BRH; 16	OUL; 1	CRO; 1	THR; 1	KNO; 1	**SNE**; 7	OUL; C	BRH; 4	CAD; 2	**DON**; 1	DON; 6	SIL; 1	BRH	**1st**	**202**

=== British Superbike Championship ===
==== By year ====
Year	Make	1		2		3			4		5		6			7			8			9			10		11		12			Pos	Pts
Year	Make	R1	R2	R1	R2	R1	R2	R3	R1	R2	R1	R2	R1	R2	R3	R1	R2	R3	R1	R2	R3	R1	R2	R3	R1	R2	R1	R2	R1	R2	R3	Pos	Pts
2012	Kawasaki	BHI	BHI; C	THR	THR	OUL	OUL	OUL	SNE	SNE	KNO	KNO	OUL; Ret	OUL; DNS	OUL; 20	BHGP	BHGP		CAD	CAD		DON	DON		ASS	ASS	SIL	SIL	BHGP	BHGP	BHGP	NC	0

Year	Make	1			2			3			4			5			6			7			8			9			10			11			12			Pos	Pts
Year	Make	R1	R2	R3	R1	R2	R3	R1	R2	R3	R1	R2	R3	R1	R2	R3	R1	R2	R3	R1	R2	R3	R1	R2	R3	R1	R2	R3	R1	R2	R3	R1	R2	R3	R1	R2	R3	Pos	Pts
2013	Kawasaki	BHI; 6	BHI; 10		THR; Ret	THR; 6		OUL; Ret	OUL; 8		KNO; 4	KNO; 13		SNE; DNS	SNE; DNS		BHGP; 8	BHGP; 10		OUL; 11	OUL; 8	OUL; 7	CAD; 9	CAD; DNS		DON; DNS	DON; DNS		ASS	ASS		SIL	SIL		BHGP	BHGP	BHGP	14th	93
2014	Kawasaki	BHI; 19	BHI; 19		OUL; Ret	OUL; Ret		SNE; 14	SNE; DNS		KNO; 15	KNO; 14		BHGP; Ret	BHGP; 3		THR; 14	THR; DNS		OUL; 17	OUL; 13	OUL; Ret	CAD; DNS	CAD; DNS		DON	DON		ASS	ASS		SIL	SIL		BHGP	BHGP	BHGP	23rd	26

Year	Bike	1		2		3			4		5		6		7		8		9			10		11		12			Pos	Pts
Year	Bike	R1	R2	R1	R2	R1	R2	R3	R1	R2	R1	R2	R1	R2	R1	R2	R1	R2	R1	R2	R3	R1	R2	R1	R2	R1	R2	R3	Pos	Pts
2019	BMW	SIL; 15	SIL; 12	OUL; 7	OUL; 8	DON; 8	DON; 10	DON; Ret	BRH; 6	BRH; 8	KNO; DNS	KNO; DNS	SNE	SNE	THR	THR	CAD	CAD	OUL	OUL	OUL	ASS	ASS	DON	DON	BHGP	BHGP	BHGP	18th	54

Year	Bike	1			2			3			4			5			6			7			8			9			10			11			Pos	Pts
Year	Bike	R1	R2	R3	R1	R2	R3	R1	R2	R3	R1	R2	R3	R1	R2	R3	R1	R2	R3	R1	R2	R3	R1	R2	R3	R1	R2	R3	R1	R2	R3	R1	R2	R3	Pos	Pts
2020	Suzuki	DON; DNS	DON; DNS	DON; DNS	SNE	SNE	SNE	SIL	SIL	SIL	OUL; 15	OUL; Ret	OUL; 18	DON; 13	DON; 11	DON; 15	BHGP	BHGP	BHGP																19th	10
2021	BMW	OUL	OUL	OUL	KNO	KNO	KNO	BHGP	BHGP	BHGP	THR	THR	THR	DON	DON	DON	CAD	CAD	CAD	SNE	SNE	SNE	SIL; Ret	SIL; DNS	SIL; DNS	OUL	OUL	OUL	DON	DON	DON	BHGP	BHGP	BHGP	NC	0

=== British Supersport Championship ===
(key) (Races in bold indicate pole position; races in italics indicate fastest lap)

Year	Bike	1	2	3	4	5	6	7	8	9	10	11	12	13	14	15	16	17	18	19	20	21	22	23	24	Pos	Pts
2015	MV Agusta	DON	DON	BRH	BRH	OUL	OUL	SNE	SNE	KNO	KNO	BRH	BRH	THR; 15	THR; 18	CAD; Ret	CAD; 13	OUL; 15	OUL; 8	ASS; Ret	ASS; 25	SIL	SIL	BRH	BRH	23th	13
