= James Lodge =

British motorcycle racer

- Nationality: British
- Born: 18 May 1989 (age 37); Holmfirth, West Yorkshire
Motorcycle racing career statistics
125cc World Championship
Active years	2009–2010
Manufacturers	Honda
Championships	0
2010 championship position	NC (0 pts)
Starts / Wins / Podiums / Poles / F. laps / Points; 2 / 0 / 0 / 0 / 0 / 0

James Lodge (born 18 May 1989 in Holmfirth, West Yorkshire) is a British motorcycle racer who was a two-time British 125 cc champion 2009 and 2010. Lodge also rode two wildcard races in the 125 cc category at the British rounds of 2009 and 2010 World Championships, failing to finish both times. Lodge competed in the National Superstock 600 Championship in 2014. He gained his first podium in the class at the Brands Hatch Indy circuit at the first race of the 2012 season.

In 2016, Lodge made a brief return to racing, riding a Kawasaki ZX7R in the Thundersport GB 'Golden Era Superbike' series at Cadwell Park. Having not ridden for nearly two years and with 50 bhp less than the front runners, Lodge finished on the podium twice, including a win in the final race of the weekend.

In 2021, Lodge raced in the No Limits Racing ACU National Endurance 1000 Championship with his brother Jonathon Lodge on a BMW S1000RR. They were the only single bike entry in the championship and went on to take two third places, two second places and two wins before winning the championship at the final round at Brands Hatch GP circuit, beating the four bike entry of Delkevic Racing by two points.

2021 also saw Lodge return briefly to British Supersport for RS Racing on a Kalex in the British GP2 Championship. After limited track time in Friday Practice, Lodge qualified 18th for the sprint race, which he finished 19th overall and ninth in the GP2 class. Sunday's feature race would see him start 19th on the grid but an incident involving spilled coolant at Clearways on lap eight brought the red flag out as five riders including Lodge had fallen.

== Career ==
=== Starting out ===
Lodge started out racing in 2006, when he competed in the ACU Star Championship, finishing fourth in the championship. In 2007, Lodge moved to the ACU Motostar Championship in which he finished third. He then moved into the British 125cc championship with Lodge finishing a respectable sixth place. He stayed in the 125 class for 2009 with the KRP / BRICON Honda team, winning the 125 championship at the second attempt. Lodge decided to stay in the championship to defend his title for 2010, which he did successfully. Lodge also rode in the 125cc class at the British Grand Prix, retiring from the race as a wildcard.

=== National Superstock 600 Championship ===
For 2011, Lodge moved into the Superstock 600 category riding Kawasaki. He didn't finish inside the points with a best of 16th place at Knockhill and Brands Hatch.

For the 2012 season, Lodge changed teams to a Yamaha, in the first round of the 2012 season he achieved his first podium finish in the class (2nd) with team mates in first and third. He eventually finished seventh overall and fifth in 2013.

== Career statistics ==
2006– 6th, British ACU Motostar Championship #29 Honda RS125R
2007– 4th, British ACU Motostar Championship #29 Honda RS125R
2008– 6th, British 125 Championship #29 Honda RS125R
2009– 1st, British 125 Championship #29 Honda RS125R
2010– 1st, British 125 Championship #1 Honda RS125R
2011– NC, National Superstock 600 Championship #29 Kawasaki ZX-6R
2012– 7th, National Superstock 600 Championship #29 Yamaha YZF-R6
2013– 5th, National Superstock 600 Championship #7 Kawasaki ZX-6R
2014– 5th, National Superstock 600 Championship #7 Kawasaki ZX-6R

Stats updated 28 July 2012

=== All time ===
Series	Years active	Races	Poles	Podiums	**Wins**	**2nd place**	**3rd place**	Fast Laps	Titles
British 125cc	^{2008–2010}	36	8	14	6	5	3	6	2
125cc	^{2009–10}	2	0	0	0	0	0	0	0
National Superstock 600	^{2011–}	15	1	3	0	3	0	1	0
Total		52	9	17	6	8	3	7	2

=== Grand Prix motorcycle racing ===
==== Races by year ====
Year	Bike	1	2	3	4	5	6	7	8	9	10	11	12	13	14	15	16	17	Pos	Pts	Ref
2009	Honda	QAT	JPN	SPA	FRA	ITA	CAT	NED	GER	GBR; Ret	CZE	INP	SMR	POR	AUS	MAL	VAL		NC	0	
2010	Honda	QAT	ESP	FRA	ITA	GBR; Ret	NED	CAT	GER	CZE	INP	RSM	ARA	JPN	MAL	AUS	POR	VAL	NC	0	

==== British 125cc ====
(key) (Races in bold indicate pole position, races in italics indicate fastest lap)

Year	Bike	1	2	3	4	5	6	7	8	9	10	11	12	13	Pos	Pts	Ref
2008	Honda	THR; 15	OUL; Ret	BHGP; 9	DON; 7	SNE; 9	MAL; 4	OUL; 7	KNO; 6	CAD; 11	CRO; 7	SIL; 4	BHI; 1		6th	109	
2009	Honda	BHI; 4	OUL; 3	DON; 2	THR; 4	SNE; 2	KNO; 1	MAL; 2	**BHGP**; 2	CAD; Ret	CRO; 6	SIL; 3	OUL; 7		**1st**	**182**	
2010	Seel Honda	BHI; 1	**THR**; 1	**OUL**; 1	**CAD**; Ret	MAL; 3	KNO; C	**SNE**; 24	**BHGP**; 1	CAD; Ret					**1st**	**149**	
2010	Honda										**CRO**; Ret	**CRO**; Ret	SIL; 2	OUL; 4	**1st**	**149**	

==== National Superstock 600 ====
Year	Bike	1	2	3	4	5	6	7	8	9	10	11	12	13	Pos	Pts	Ref
2011	Kawasaki	BHI; Ret	OUL; Ret	CRO	THR; 30	KNO; 16	SNE	OUL	BHGP	CAD	DON	SIL; 24	BHGP; 16		NC	0	
2012	Yamaha	BHI; 2	THR; 11	OUL; Ret	SIL; 9	SIL; 7	SNE; 11	KNO; Ret	OUL; 2	**BHGP**; 2	CAD	DON	SIL	BHGP	5th*	82*	

- * Season still in progress
