= Connor Behan =

British motorcycle racer

Connor Behan is an English former Grand Prix motorcycle racer and Isle of Man TT rider from Newcastle-under-Lyme who competed between 2004 and 2015. In 2014, he became Irish Road Race Supertwin champion.

In March 2017 he was sentenced to three years imprisonment for supplying drugs in Spain, but was released after one year.

On 17 December 2018, Behan was arrested in Northwich for dangerous driving. He was also found in possession of cocaine and a knuckle duster when stopped.

On 18 December 2024, Behan was found guilty on multiple counts of rape and sexual assault of a girl under the age of 13. He has been jailed for 18 years following a seven-day trial and will remain on the Sex Offenders Register for the rest of his life.

== Career statistics ==
=== British 125cc Championship ===
(key) (Races in bold indicate pole position, races in italics indicate fastest lap)

Year	Bike	1	2	3	4	5	6	7	8	9	10	11	12	Pos	Pts
2009	Honda	BHI; 6	OUL; 5	DON; Ret	THR; 6	SNE; Ret	KNO; 3	MAL; Ret	BHGP; Ret	CAD; 3	CRO; 1	SIL; Ret	OUL; 6	**5th**	**104**

=== National Superstock 600 Championship ===
Year	Bike	1	2	3	4	5	6	7	8	9	10	11	12	13	Pos	Pts
2011	Kawasaki	BRH; 5	OUL; 7	CRO; 9	THR; 3	KNO; 8	SNE; 2	OUL; C	**BRH**; 1	CAD; 6	DON; 4	DON; Ret	SIL; Ret	BRH; 7	**3rd**	**128**
