= 2010 British 125 Championship =

The 2010 British 125 Championship season was the 23rd British 125cc Championship season, the class is open to anyone of any age and sex. James Lodge stayed in the class after winning the championship last season, and was looking to be the first person to successfully defend the British 125cc Championship. With a number of riders leaving to move up to other classes such as superstock 600, new challengers emerged to challenge for the title. With the two stroke classes disappearing from the world scene in 2012, the future of the 125 championship in Britain is looking doubtful.

As well as the main championship there was a separate class called the ACU Academy Cup, for 13- to 16-year-old riders, with an end of season prize of paid entries to the final two rounds of the CEV Championship (Spanish 125 Championship) at Valencia and Jerez. A number of the riders from the British 125 Championship also contested the Red Bull MotoGP Rookie Cup, a championship for 125cc motorcycles that takes place alongside specific rounds of Grand Prix motorcycle racing. In 2010, Danny Kent, Harry Stafford and Taylor Mackenzie all raced in the championship finishing second, seventh and 15th respectively.

Lodge eventually retained his title but only after coming out of a final round, three-way title battle with Rob Guiver and Deane Brown. Lodge won the championship by four points, taking four victories over the course of the season, with Guiver finishing second ahead of Brown on countback; two victories to Brown's one. Taylor Mackenzie (3), John McPhee and Ross Walker were the other riders to win races over the season. Brown won the secondary Academy Cup with six victories.

== Calendar ==
The British 125 Championship was a support series for the main British Superbike Championship, and thus it followed the same calendar structure with one race per meeting held on the Sunday.

2010 Calendar
Round	Circuit	Date	Class	Pole position	Fastest lap	Winning rider	Winning team
1	(England) Brands Hatch Indy	5 April		(Scotland) Taylor Mackenzie	(England) James Lodge	(England) James Lodge	RS Racing / Earnshaws M'cycles
1	(England) Brands Hatch Indy	5 April	C	(Scotland) Deane Brown	(Scotland) John McPhee	(England) Fraser Rogers	KRP / Racing Steps Foundations
2	(England) Thruxton	18 April		(England) James Lodge	(England) James Lodge	(England) James Lodge	RS Racing / Earnshaws M'cycles
2	(England) Thruxton	18 April	C	(Scotland) Deane Brown	(England) Fraser Rogers	(England) Fraser Rogers	KRP / Racing Steps Foundations
3	(England) Oulton Park	3 May		(England) James Lodge	(England) James Lodge	(England) James Lodge	RS Racing / Earnshaws M'cycles
3	(England) Oulton Park	3 May	C	(Scotland) Deane Brown	(Scotland) Deane Brown	(Scotland) Deane Brown	Colin Appleyard / Macadam Racing
4	(England) Cadwell Park	23 May		(England) James Lodge	(England) Rob Guiver	(Scotland) Taylor Mackenzie	KRP Node 4 MMCG
4	(England) Cadwell Park	23 May	C	(England) Harry Stafford	(Scotland) Deane Brown	(Scotland) Deane Brown	Colin Appleyard / Macadam Racing
5	(England) Mallory Park	27 June		(England) Rob Guiver	(England) Rob Guiver	(England) Ross Walker	Ross Walker Racing
5	(England) Mallory Park	27 June	C	(Australia) Matthew Davies	(Australia) Matthew Davies	(Scotland) Deane Brown	Colin Appleyard / Macadam Racing
6	(Scotland) Knockhill	4 July		(England) James Lodge^{2}	Race Cancelled^{1}		
6	(Scotland) Knockhill	4 July	C	(Scotland) John McPhee^{2}	Race Cancelled^{1}		
7	(England) Snetterton	17 July		(England) James Lodge	(England) Rob Guiver	(England) Rob Guiver	SP125 / Brookhouse Garage Racing
7	(England) Snetterton	17 July	C	(England) Fraser Rogers	(Spain) Dakota Mamola	(Spain) Dakota Mamola	KRP / Monster Energy
8	(England) Brands Hatch GP	7 August		(England) James Lodge	(England) James Lodge	(England) James Lodge	RS Racing / Earnshaws M'cyc
8	(England) Brands Hatch GP	7 August	C	(Northern Ireland) Andrew Reid	(England) Fraser Rogers	(Scotland) John McPhee	KRP/Bradley Smith Racing
9	(England) Cadwell Park	30 August		(England) Rob Guiver	(England) Rob Guiver	(England) Rob Guiver	SP125 / Brookhouse Garage Racing
9	(England) Cadwell Park	30 August	C	(Scotland) John McPhee	(England) Sam Hornsey	(Scotland) John McPhee	KRP/Bradley Smith Racing
10	(England) Croft	11 September		(England) James Lodge^{2}	(Northern Ireland) Nigel Percy	(Scotland) John McPhee^{3}	KRP/Bradley Smith Racing
10	(England) Croft	11 September	C	(Scotland) John McPhee^{2}	(Scotland) John McPhee	(Scotland) John McPhee^{3}	KRP/Bradley Smith Racing
11	(England) Croft	12 September		(England) James Lodge	(Scotland) Taylor Mackenzie	(Scotland) Taylor Mackenzie	KRP Node 4 MMCG
11	(England) Croft	12 September	C	(Scotland) Deane Brown	(Scotland) Deane Brown	(Scotland) Deane Brown	Colin Appleyard / Macadam Racing
12	(England) Silverstone Arena GP	26 September		(Scotland) Taylor Mackenzie	(England) Rob Guiver	(Scotland) Deane Brown	Colin Appleyard / Macadam Racing
12	(England) Silverstone Arena GP	26 September	C	(Scotland) Deane Brown	(Scotland) Deane Brown	(Scotland) Deane Brown	Colin Appleyard / Macadam Racing
13	(England) Oulton Park	9 October		(Scotland) Taylor Mackenzie	(Scotland) Taylor Mackenzie	(Scotland) Taylor Mackenzie	KRP Node 4 MMCG
13	(England) Oulton Park	9 October	C	(Scotland) John McPhee	(Scotland) Deane Brown	(Scotland) Deane Brown	Colin Appleyard / Macadam Racing

Icon	Class
C	ACU Academy Cup

Notes:

1. – The Knockhill race was cancelled due to bad weather conditions.
2. – As a result, there was a double header of 125 action at Croft with Race one taking place on Saturday 11 September and race 2 taking place on the Sunday. The grid positions from Knockhill were carried forward for the first race. Riders who did not take part at Knockhill were not eligible to enter the first race at Croft.
3. – The first race at Croft was stopped after three laps and restarted, before the restart was stopped after three laps due to a circuit curfew. The race result was declared, with half points awarded as per series regulations.

== Championship standings ==
=== Riders' standings ===
Pos	Rider	Bike	BHI (England)	THR (England)	OUL (England)	CAD (England)	MAL (England)	KNO (Scotland)	SNE (England)	BHGP (England)	CAD (England)	CRO^{3} (England)		SIL (England)	OUL (England)	Pts
1	(England) James Lodge	Seel Honda	1	**1**	**1**	**Ret**	3	C	**24**	**1**	Ret					149
1	(England) James Lodge	Honda										**Ret**	**Ret**	2	4	149
2	(England) Rob Guiver	Honda	2	17	3	3	Ret	C	1	8	**1**	3	5	Ret	3	145
3	(Scotland) Deane Brown	Honda	Ret	Ret	2	2	2	C	Ret	6	Ret	2	2	1	2	145
4	(Scotland) Taylor Mackenzie	Honda	**Ret**	4	4	1	7	C		2	Ret	14	1	**Ret**	**1**	131
5	(Scotland) John McPhee	Honda	4	10	DSQ	6	9	C	Ret	3	2	1	3	17	Ret	100.5
6	(England) Fraser Rogers	Honda	3	6	Ret	4	DSQ	C	Ret	4	Ret	10	11	4	5	84
7	(England) Sam Hornsey	Cougar	11	Ret	12	15										69.5
7	(England) Sam Hornsey	Honda					4	C	3	9	6	7	Ret	Ret	7	69.5
8	(England) Edward Rendell	Honda	Ret	8	8	Ret	13	C	DNS	Ret	5	9	4	3	Ret	62.5
9	(England) Philip Wakefield	Honda	9	9	11	8	6	C	5	11	17			7	Ret	62
10	(England) Lee Jackson	Honda	14	13	14	11	5	C	8	15	7	12	8	21	9	58
11	(England) Jon Vincent	Honda	10	14	13	9	8	C	6	Ret	11	13	6	Ret	Ret	52.5
12	(Northern Ireland) Andrew Reid	Honda	13	7	Ret	16	15	C	9	16	3	20	7	10	Ret	51
13	(England) Wayne Ryan	Honda	7	Ret	6	Ret	14	C	4	12	15	19	16	Ret	6	49
14	(England) Shaun Horsman	Honda	Ret	Ret	Ret	10	Ret	C	12	17	4	16	9	5	12	45
15	(Spain) Dakota Mamola	Honda	Ret		7				2	5			WD			40
16	(Australia) Matthew Davies	Honda		15	5	Ret	Ret	C	Ret	10	DNS	5	10	16	8	37.5
17	(Northern Ireland) William Dunlop	Honda	6	5	10	7	17									36
18	(England) Brian Clark	Honda	Ret	2	Ret	5										31
19	(England) James Ford	Honda	8	3	Ret	DNS	Ret		18	20	20		WD	9	27	31
20	(Scotland) Matthew Paulo	Honda	Ret	12	Ret	14	10	C	11	19	9	6	17	Ret	19	29
21	(England) Ross Walker	Honda	23	16	17	13	1	C	Ret			DNS	28	Ret		28
22	(Northern Ireland) Nigel Percy	Honda						C	14	14	8	4	12	Ret	11	27.5
23	(England) Danny Kent	Honda	5		9	Ret				7			WD			27
24	(England) Tom Weeden	Honda	12	11	19	19	11	C	17	18	10	Ret	18	24	14	22
25	(Scotland) Peter Sutherland	Honda		19	15	21	16	C	7			8	13	Ret	15	18
26	(England) Kyle Ryde	Honda								13	14		14	6	Ret	17
27	(England) Harry Stafford	Honda	Ret	18		DNS		C		DNS		11	DNS	8	10	16.5
28	(England) Ben Barratt	Honda	17	21	18	Ret	12	C	Ret	21	12	15	15	15	13	13.5
29	(England) Simon Low	Honda	15	Ret	Ret	17	Ret		10	Ret	13		WD	13	Ret	13
30	(England) Bradley Hughes	Honda	25	24	DNS	22			13	24	16			12	17	7
31	(England) Dan Moreton	Honda											24	11	20	5
32	(England) Arnie Shelton	Honda				12				25	Ret		19			4
33	(England) Elliott Lodge	Honda	16	Ret	20	20	20	C	16	Ret	19	Ret	Ret	14	Ret	2
34	(England) Catherine Green	Honda	Ret	Ret	16	DNS	22		15	Ret	18		20	Ret	18	1
	(England) Ian Stanford	Honda	Ret	Ret	22	Ret	Ret	C	Ret	Ret	Ret	Ret	26	Ret	16	0
	(Scotland) Tarran Mackenzie	Honda	Ret	Ret	26	26	27	C	23	23	23	17	Ret	23	26	0
	(England) Neil Durham	Aprilia	20	Ret	21	18	23	C		Ret	21	18	DNS			0
	(England) Sam Shorrock	Honda	Ret	20	Ret	Ret	25		Ret	Ret				18	25	0
	(England) Kasey Wyatt	Honda	18	22	23	Ret	21									0
	(England) Curtis Wright	Honda					18				DNQ					0
	(England) Richard Ferguson	Honda	21	Ret			28	C	19	30	22	Ret	21	Ret	22	0
	(England) Gary Winfield	Honda	24	25	25	24	26	C	21	28	24	21	27	19	23	0
	(England) Josh Harland	Honda	19	DNS	24	Ret	24	C			Ret	DNS	23	Ret	DNQ	0
	(South Africa) Luca Agostinelli	Honda		Ret			19	C		27						0
	(England) Paul Dobb	Honda							20	26				Ret		0
	(England) Michael Shuker	Honda												20		0
	(England) Jamie Hodson	Honda													21	0
	(England) Charlie King	Honda	22	Ret	Ret	23	DNS		22	29	25					0
	(Scotland) Stuart Wilson	Honda						C				22	22			0
	(England) Gavin Lupton	Honda								22						0
	(England) Tom Carne	Honda												22		0
	(Scotland) Sammi Tasker	Honda						C				23	25			0
	(England) Michael Hill	Honda	Ret	23			DNS									0
	(Scotland) Ewan Gray	Honda						C							24	0
	(England) Paul Hedison	Honda				25										0
	(England) James Ferguson	Honda								31						0
	(England) Jamie Edwards	Honda	DNS	Ret												0
	(Wales) Dylan Davies	Honda												Ret		0
	(England) Graham English	Honda												Ret		0
	(Scotland) Graham Adkins	Honda						C								0
Pos	Rider	Bike	BHI (England)	THR (England)	OUL (England)	CAD (England)	MAL (England)	KNO (Scotland)	SNE (England)	BHGP (England)	CAD (England)	CRO (England)		SIL (England)	OUL (England)	Pts

Colour	Result
Gold	Winner
Silver	Second place
Bronze	Third place
Green	Points classification
Blue	Non-points classification
Blue	Non-classified finish (NC)
Purple	Retired, not classified (Ret)
Red	Did not qualify (DNQ)
Red	Did not pre-qualify (DNPQ)
Black	Disqualified (DSQ)
White	Did not start (DNS)
White	Withdrew (WD)
White	Race cancelled (C)
Blank	Did not practice (DNP)
Blank	Did not arrive (DNA)
Blank	Excluded (EX)

**Bold** – Pole
Italics – Fastest Lap

=== ACU Academy Cup standings ===
Pos	Rider	Bike	BHI (England)	THR (England)	OUL (England)	CAD (England)	MAL (England)	KNO (Scotland)	SNE (England)	BHGP (England)	CAD (England)	CRO (England)		SIL (England)	OUL (England)	Pts
1	(Scotland) Deane Brown	Honda	**Ret**	**Ret**	2	**2**	2	C	Ret	6	Ret	2	**2**	**1**	2	173
2	(Scotland) John McPhee	Honda	4	10	**DSQ**	6	9	C	Ret	**3**	2	**1**	3	17	**Ret**	154.5
3	(England) Fraser Rogers	Honda	3	6	Ret	4	DSQ	C	**Ret**	4	Ret	10	11	4	5	145.5
4	(England) Lee Jackson	Honda	14	13	14	11	5	C	8	15	7	12	8	21	9	121.5
5	(England) Sam Hornsey	Cougar	11	Ret	12	15										117.5
5	(England) Sam Hornsey	Honda					4	C	3	9	**6**	7	Ret	Ret	7	117.5
6	(Northern Ireland) Andrew Reid	Honda	13	7	Ret	16	15	C	9	16	3	20	7	10	Ret	114
7	(England) Wayne Ryan	Honda	7	Ret	6	Ret	14	C	4	13	15	19	16	Ret	6	99.5
8	(England) Tom Weeden	Honda	12	11	19	19	11	C	17	18	10	Ret	18	24	14	91
9	(Australia) Matthew Davies	Honda		15	5	Ret	**Ret**	C	Ret	10		5	10	16	8	77
10	(England) Elliott Lodge	Honda	16	Ret	20	20	20	C	16	Ret	19	Ret	Ret	14	Ret	53
11	(Spain) Dakota Mamola	Honda	Ret		7				2	5			WD			52
12	(England) Bradley Hughes	Honda	25	24	DNS	22			13	24	16			12	17	52
13	(England) Gary Winfield	Honda	24	25	25	24	26	C	21	24		21	27	19	23	45.5
14	(England) Kyle Ryde	Honda								13	14		14	6	Ret	42
15	(England) Danny Kent	Honda	5		9	Ret				7			WD			38
16	(England) Harry Stafford	Honda	Ret	18		DNS		C		DNS		11	DNS	8	10	36
17	(England) Richard Ferguson	Honda	21	Ret			28	C	19		22	Ret	21	Ret	22	30
18	(Scotland) Tarran Mackenzie	Honda	Ret	Ret	26	26	27	C	23	23	23	17	Ret	23	26	28
19	(England) Kasey Wyatt	Honda	18	22	23	Ret	21									25
20	(England) Josh Harland	Honda	19	DNS	24	Ret	24	C			Ret		23	Ret	DNQ	18
21	(England) Charlie King	Honda	22	Ret	Ret	23	DNS		22	25						17
22	(England) Curtis Wright	Honda					18				DNQ					8
23	(South Africa) Luca Agostinelli	Honda		Ret			19	C		27						8
24	(Scotland) Stuart Wilson	Honda						C				22	22			7
25	(Scotland) Sammi Tasker	Honda						C				23	25			4.5
26	(England) Tom Carne	Honda												22		4
27	(Scotland) Ewan Gray	Honda						C							24	4
Pos	Rider	Bike	BHI (England)	THR (England)	OUL (England)	CAD (England)	MAL (England)	KNO (Scotland)	SNE (England)	BHGP (England)	CAD (England)	CRO (England)		SIL (England)	OUL (England)	Pts

Colour	Result
Gold	Winner
Silver	Second place
Bronze	Third place
Green	Points classification
Blue	Non-points classification
Blue	Non-classified finish (NC)
Purple	Retired, not classified (Ret)
Red	Did not qualify (DNQ)
Red	Did not pre-qualify (DNPQ)
Black	Disqualified (DSQ)
White	Did not start (DNS)
White	Withdrew (WD)
White	Race cancelled (C)
Blank	Did not practice (DNP)
Blank	Did not arrive (DNA)
Blank	Excluded (EX)

**Bold** – Pole
Italics – Fastest Lap
