= 2011 National Superstock 600 Championship =

The 2011 National Superstock 600 Championship season was the fourth season of the British National Superstock 600 Championship. The motorcycles are stock 600cc bikes, this means that not many racing modifications can be made to the bikes, to promote a close and affordable racing environment. The class is strictly for riders aged 16–25, with riders that finish the previous year in the top three of the championship are not eligible for the following season.

The previous year championship winner Josh Day moved up to the British Superbike Evo class. One of the main names to come into this class in 2011 was James Lodge, a two-time 125cc championship winner.

The championship began on April 25th at Brands Hatch and ended on October 9th at the same venue after 12 rounds.

== Calendar ==
2011 Calendar
Round		Circuit	Date	Pole position	Fastest lap	Winning rider	Winning team
1		(England) Brands Hatch Indy	25 April	(Scotland) Deane Brown	(Australia) Ben Burke	(Australia) Ben Burke	Bike Interceptor Yamaha by Seton
2		(England) Oulton Park	2 May	(England) James East	(England) James East	(Northern Ireland) Keith Farmer	Farmer Racing
3		(England) Croft	15 May	(England) James East	(Scotland) Deane Brown	(Northern Ireland) Keith Farmer	Farmer Racing
4		(England) Thruxton	30 May	(England) James East	(England) Josh Wainwright	(Northern Ireland) Keith Farmer	Farmer Racing
5		(Scotland) Knockhill	19 June	(Northern Ireland) Glenn Irwin	(Northern Ireland) Keith Farmer	(Northern Ireland) Keith Farmer	Farmer Racing
6		(England) Snetterton 300	3 July	(Northern Ireland) Keith Farmer	(Northern Ireland) Keith Farmer	(Northern Ireland) Glenn Irwin	MWR
7		(England) Oulton Park	17 July	Race Cancelled^{1}			
8		(England) Brands Hatch GP	7 August	(England) Connor Behan	(England) Connor Behan	(England) Connor Behan	Bristol Kawasaki Team Green
9		(England) Cadwell Park	29 August	(England) James East	(England) Freddie Russo	(England) Freddie Russo	AP Kawasaki
10	R1	(England) Donington Park	10 September	(Northern Ireland) Keith Farmer	(Northern Ireland) Glenn Irwin	(Northern Ireland) Keith Farmer	Farmer Racing
10	R2	(England) Donington Park	11 September	(England) Freddie Russo	(England) Connor Behan	(Northern Ireland) Glenn Irwin	MWR
11		(England) Silverstone Arena GP	25 September	(Northern Ireland) Glenn Irwin	(Northern Ireland) Keith Farmer	(Northern Ireland) Keith Farmer	Farmer Racing
12		(England) Brands Hatch GP	9 October	(Northern Ireland) Glenn Irwin	(Northern Ireland) Glenn Irwin	(Northern Ireland) Glenn Irwin	MWR

Notes:

1. – The race at Oulton Park was cancelled due to bad weather conditions. As a result, the race was run at Donington Park, with the grid positions standing for the race.

== Championship standings ==
Pos	Rider	Bike	BRH (England)	OUL (England)	CRO (England)	THR (England)	KNO (Scotland)	SNE (England)	OUL (England)	BRH (England)	CAD (England)	DON (England)		SIL (England)	BRH (England)	Pts
1	(Northern Ireland) Keith Farmer	Yamaha	16	1	1	1	1	7	C	4	2	1	6	1		202
2	(Northern Ireland) Glenn Irwin	Kawasaki	6	Ret	7	Ret	2	1	C	Ret	Ret	2	1	2	1	154
3	(England) Connor Behan	Kawasaki	5	7	9	3	8	2	C	1	6	4	Ret	Ret	7	128
4	(Scotland) Deane Brown	Yamaha	3	Ret	3	7	5	6	C	Ret	8	3	3	7	3	127
5	(Australia) Ben Burke	Yamaha	1	3	34	24	9	DNS	C	6	12	9	7	6	2	108
6	(England) James East	Yamaha	2	Ret	5	4	DNS	4	C	Ret	3	Ret	5	8	4	105
7	(England) Johnny Blackshaw	Triumph	10	5	13	9	7	11	C	5	Ret	5	2	4	DNS	96
8	(England) Freddie Russo	Kawasaki	Ret	2	15	Ret	10	5	C	2	1	Ret	9	11	Ret	95
9	(England) Josh Wainwright	Suzuki	20	Ret	23	2	19	Ret	C	8	4	6	4	3	DNS	80
10	(Republic of Ireland) Cody Nally	Kawasaki	4	Ret	11	8	3	10	C		13	DNQ	Ret	9	8	66
11	(England) Jonathan Lodge	Triumph	9	8	17	14	11	24	C	9	9	7	12	Ret		49
12	(England) Grant Whitaker	Yamaha		12	4	10		9	C	7	10	15	18	15	DNS	47
13	(England) Jake Newstead	Yamaha	Ret	Ret	8	5	17	3	C	11	Ret	11	23	20	19	45
14	(England) Alex Olsen	Triumph	23	Ret	22	13	Ret	28	C	3	11	13	10	5	DNS	44
15	(Scotland) Daniel Kinloch	Kawasaki	Ret	13	2	Ret	6	25	C	25	21	12	11	16	27	42
16	(Scotland) Tim Hastings	Kawasaki	13	Ret	10	6	13	23	C	13	Ret	10	13	Ret	DNS	34
17	(England) Tom Fisher	Kawasaki	21	Ret	28	26	20	8	C	19	14	8	8	Ret	10	32
18	(England) Dominic Usher	Yamaha	Ret	4	21	16	14	18	C	29	7	17	Ret	10	20	30
19	(England) Tom Young	Kawasaki	11	11	14	12	4	Ret	C	Ret	15	Ret	Ret	Ret	DNS	30
20	(England) Ben Grindrod	Kawasaki	7	9	12	21	15	19	C	22	16	16	21	19	DNS	21
21	(South Africa) Bjorn Estment	Yamaha											Ret	12	5	15
22	(England) James Rose	Yamaha	25	WD	6	11										15
23	(Scotland) Adam Lyon	Suzuki	12	6	18	15										15
24	(England) Daniel Hegarty	Kawasaki	15								5		15			13
25	(England) Alex Barkshire	Yamaha	Ret	14	16	17	12	17	C	10	Ret	Ret	22	17	15	13
26	(Northern Ireland) Andy Reid	Suzuki								Ret	DNS		17	Ret		10
27	(England) Brad Anderson	Kawasaki	14	10	DNQ			15	C	Ret						9
28	(England) Tony Coombs	Kawasaki	8	Ret	19	29		DNS								8
29	(Scotland) Niall Campbell	Yamaha	18	16	20	18	18	Ret	C	15	22	Ret	19	23	9	8
30	(Scotland) Matthew Paulo	Yamaha	DNQ			32			C	21	19	Ret	Ret	13	13	6
31	(Australia) Andy Lawson	Yamaha							C	18	18	Ret	14	14	14	6
32	(England) Tom Weeden	Triumph					Ret		C			Ret	DNS		11	5
33	(Isle of Man) David Pearce	Kawasaki	DNS	Ret				12	C		17	DNS	DNS			4
34	(England) Jimmy Dye	Triumph	19	Ret	31	19		32	C	12	20	Ret	20	22	Ret	4
35	(England) James Phare	Yamaha	Ret					20		Ret					12	4
36	(Scotland) Scott Kelly	Yamaha					22	13	C	20						3
37	(England) Leon Jeacock	Yamaha	Ret	17	DNQ	27	27		C	16	23	14	16	Ret		2
38	(England) Daniel Murphy	Yamaha	Ret	Ret	24	25	21	14	C	Ret	Ret	19	Ret			2
39	(England) Scott Hudson	Yamaha								14					DNS	2
40	(England) Jamie Devine	Yamaha	DNQ	15	32	23	Ret		C							1
41	(England) James Lodge	Kawasaki	Ret	Ret		30	16							24	16	0
42	(England) Benjamin Gautrey	Kawasaki	24	Ret	26	22	Ret	16	C	17	Ret †					0
43	(England) Ross Ashman	Kawasaki	Ret	22	25	DNS		26		26				18	17	0
44	(Malaysia) Farid Badrul	Kawasaki	17	DNQ	Ret	28	29	22	C	24	DNQ					0
45	(England) Simon Napier	Kawasaki	DNQ	20	DNS	34	28	21	C	DNQ	DNS	18	Ret	Ret	29	0
46	(Scotland) John Dean	Yamaha	DNQ	DNS	Ret	33	26	33	C	23	DNQ	Ret	DNS	21	18	0
47	(England) Sam Middlemas	Triumph	Ret	18		DNS				Ret					26	0
48	(Wales) Greg James	Kawasaki	22	19	27	20		DNS	C	DNQ	Ret			27	24	0
49	(England) Josh Harland	Yamaha	DNQ	DNQ	29		DNQ	DNQ	C	DNQ	DNQ	20	25	Ret	DNQ	0
50	(England) Scott Pitchers	Kawasaki	DNQ	DNQ					C	DNQ	DNQ	21	28	Ret	21	0
51	(Northern Ireland) Stuart Elwood	Triumph	Ret	21	Ret	DNS	DNS	DNS		Ret						0
52	(Wales) Matthew Jones	Triumph							C			22	DNS			0
53	(England) Tom Ward	Triumph													22	0
54	(Wales) Jamie Harris	Yamaha	DNQ	23	33		23	30	C	DNQ	24	Ret	29	29	DNQ	0
55	(England) Jordan Simpkin	Yamaha													23	0
56	(England) Craig Neve	Triumph		DNQ	Ret	Ret	25	27	C	27	DNS	DNQ	24	26	25	0
57	(England) Daniel Fuller	Kawasaki	DNQ				24	Ret	C	Ret	DNQ	DNS	Ret	30	DNQ	0
58	(England) Piers Hutchins	Triumph	DNQ	DNQ	DNS			29		28	DNQ		26	25	Ret	0
59	(Scotland) Matthew Shellcock	Yamaha											27			0
60	(England) Adam Boyle	Triumph	DNQ	Ret	30		DNQ	DNQ	C			DNQ	30	28		0
61	(England) Joe Collier	Triumph													28	0
62	(Northern Ireland) Scott Wilson	Kawasaki					30	34	C	DNQ	DNQ					0
63	(England) Sean Neary	Kawasaki	DNQ	DNQ	Ret	31										0
64	(England) James Wainwright	Suzuki					DNQ	31								0
	(Northern Ireland) Nicole McAleer	Triumph	DNQ	DNQ	DNQ	Ret	DNQ									0
	(Scotland) Jodie Chalk	Triumph					Ret									0
	(England) Shaun Brown	Kawasaki									Ret					0
	(England) Edward Rendell	Kawasaki											Ret			0
	(England) Jack Groves	Suzuki							C							0
	(England) Tommy Dale	Triumph													DNS	0
	(England) Stephanie Waddelow	Triumph								DNQ					DNQ	0
	(England) James Johnston	Kawasaki	DNQ													0
	(England) Arron Hoar	Yamaha	DNQ													0
	(Scotland) Peter Sutherland	Kawasaki					DNQ									0
	(Netherlands) Nadieh Schoots	Triumph											DNQ			0
Pos	Rider	Bike	BRH (England)	OUL (England)	CRO (England)	THR (England)	KNO (Scotland)	SNE (England)	OUL (England)	BRH (England)	CAD (England)	DON (England)		SIL (England)	BRH (England)	Pts

Colour	Result
Gold	Winner
Silver	Second place
Bronze	Third place
Green	Points classification
Blue	Non-points classification
Blue	Non-classified finish (NC)
Purple	Retired, not classified (Ret)
Red	Did not qualify (DNQ)
Red	Did not pre-qualify (DNPQ)
Black	Disqualified (DSQ)
White	Did not start (DNS)
White	Withdrew (WD)
White	Race cancelled (C)
Blank	Did not practice (DNP)
Blank	Did not arrive (DNA)
Blank	Excluded (EX)

Notes

† Benjamin Gautrey was fatally injured in an accident during the Cadwell Park round.
