= Andrew Reid (motorcyclist) =

British motorcycle racer (born 1994)

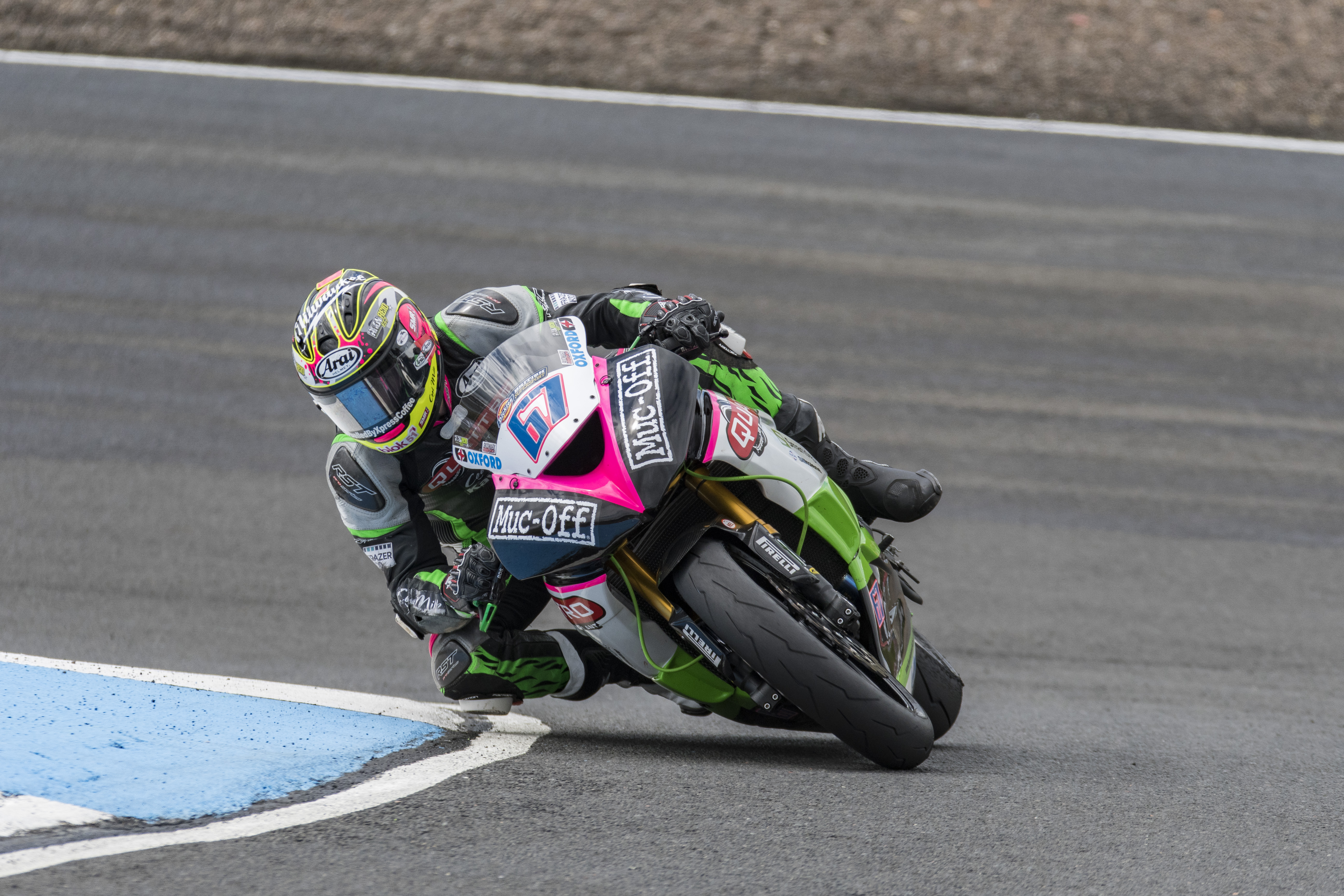
- Reid in 2016
- Nationality: British
- Born: 15 March 1994 (age 32); Jordanstown, Northern Ireland
- Current team: Tyco BMW
- Bike number: 67
- Website: andyreidracing.co.uk
Motorcycle racing career statistics
125cc World Championship
Active years	2010
Manufacturers	Honda
Starts / Wins / Podiums / Poles / F. laps / Points; 0 / 0 / 0 / 0 / 0 / 0
Supersport World Championship
Active years	2015
Manufacturers	Honda
Starts / Wins / Podiums / Poles / F. laps / Points; 1 / 0 / 0 / 0 / 0 / 6

Andrew Reid (born 15 March 1994) is a British motorcycle racer. In 2010, he participated for the first time in a 125cc World Championship event, as a wild-card rider in the British round at Silverstone but failed to qualify for the race. He made his Grand Prix debut under the Irish flag. He currently competes in the British National Superstock 1000 Championship, aboard a BMW S1000rr.

== Career statistics ==
=== British 125 Championship ===
Year	Bike	1	2	3	4	5	6	7	8	9	10	11	12	13	Pos	Pts
2009	Honda	BHI	OUL; 22	DON; 16	THR	SNE	KNO	MAL	BHGP; Ret	CAD	CRO	SIL; Ret	OUL; 14		**17th**	**28**
2010	Honda	BRH; 13	THR; 7	OUL; Ret	CAD; 16	MAL; 15	KNO; C	SNE; 9	BRH; 16	CAD; 3	CRO; 20	CRO; 7	SIL; 10	OUL; Ret	**12th**	**51**
2011	Aztec GP	BRH; 10	OUL; Ret	CRO; Ret	THR; 2	KNO; Ret	SNE; 12	OUL	BRH	CAD	DON	SIL	BRH		**18th**	**30**

=== Grand Prix motorcycle racing ===
==== By season ====
Season	Class	Motorcycle	Team	Race	Win	Podium	Pole	FLap	Pts	Plcd
2010	125cc	Honda	Aztec Grand Prix	0	0	0	0	0	0	NC
Total				**0**	**0**	**0**	**0**	**0**	**0**	

==== Races by year ====
(key) (Races in bold indicate pole position)

Year	Class	Bike	1	2	3	4	5	6	7	8	9	10	11	12	13	14	15	16	17	Pos.	Pts
2010	125cc	Honda	QAT	SPA	FRA	ITA	GBR; DNQ	NED	CAT	GER	CZE	INP	RSM	ARA	JPN	MAL	AUS	POR	VAL	NC	0

=== Supersport World Championship ===
==== Races by year ====
(key)

Year	Bike	1	2	3	4	5	6	7	8	9	10	11	12	Pos.	Pts
2015	Honda	AUS	THA	SPA	NED	ITA	GBR; 10	POR	ITA	MAL	SPA	FRA	QAT	27th	6

=== British Superbike Championship ===
Year	Make	1		2		3			4		5		6			7		8			9			10		11		12			Pos	Pts
Year	Make	R1	R2	R1	R2	R1	R2	R3	R1	R2	R1	R2	R1	R2	R3	R1	R2	R1	R2	R3	R1	R2	R3	R1	R2	R1	R2	R1	R2	R3	Pos	Pts
2017	BMW	DON	DON	BHI	BHI	OUL	OUL		KNO	KNO	SNE; 17	SNE; 18	BHGP; 19	BHGP; 18		THR; 17	THR; 16	CAD; 13	CAD; 13		SIL; Ret	SIL; Ret	SIL; DNS	OUL	OUL	ASS	ASS	BHGP	BHGP	BHGP	25th	6

=== British Supersport Championship ===
(key) (Races in bold indicate pole position; races in italics indicate fastest lap)

Year	Bike	1	2	3	4	5	6	7	8	9	10	11	12	13	14	15	16	17	18	19	20	21	22	23	24	Pos	Pts
2015	Yamaha	DON; 5	DON; 5	BRH; Ret	BRH; DNS	OUL; 4	OUL; 3	SNE; 3	SNE; Ret	KNO; DNS	KNO; DNS	BRH; 3	BRH; 3	THR; 5	THR; 2	CAD; 6	CAD; Ret	**OUL**; 1	**OUL**; Ret	ASS	ASS	SIL	SIL	BRH	BRH	9th	165
