= 2016 San Marino and Rimini Riviera motorcycle Grand Prix =

2016 San Marino and Rimini Riviera Grand Prix
Race details
- Race 13 of 18 races in the 2016 Grand Prix motorcycle racing season
- Date: 11 September 2016
- Official name: Gran Premio TIM di San Marino e della Riviera di Rimini
- Location: Misano World Circuit Marco Simoncelli
- Course: Permanent racing facility; 4.226 km (2.626 mi)

MotoGP
Pole position
Rider	(Spain) Jorge Lorenzo	Yamaha
Time	1:31.868	
Fastest lap
Rider	(Spain) Dani Pedrosa	Honda
Time	1:32.979 on lap 15	
Podium
First	(Spain) Dani Pedrosa	Honda
Second	(Italy) Valentino Rossi	Yamaha
Third	(Spain) Jorge Lorenzo	Yamaha

Moto2
Pole position
Rider	(France) Johann Zarco	Kalex
Time	1:37.436	
Fastest lap
Rider	(Spain) Álex Rins	Kalex
Time	1:37.892 on lap 9	
Podium
First	(Italy) Lorenzo Baldassarri	Kalex
Second	(Spain) Álex Rins	Kalex
Third	(Japan) Takaaki Nakagami	Kalex

Moto3
Pole position
Rider	(South Africa) Brad Binder	KTM
Time	1:42.398	
Fastest lap
Rider	(Italy) Andrea Locatelli	KTM
Time	1:42.627 on lap 4	
Podium
First	(South Africa) Brad Binder	KTM
Second	(Italy) Enea Bastianini	Honda
Third	(Spain) Joan Mir	KTM

The 2016 San Marino and Rimini Riviera motorcycle Grand Prix was the thirteenth round of the 2016 MotoGP season. It was held at the Misano World Circuit Marco Simoncelli in Misano Adriatico on 11 September 2016.

== Classification ==
=== MotoGP ===
After the first three practice sessions Michele Pirro, who was already competing in the event as a wild card entry, was designated as the replacement rider for the injured Andrea Iannone.

Pos.	No.	Rider	Team	Manufacturer	Laps	Time/Retired	Grid	Points
1	26	(Spain) Dani Pedrosa	Repsol Honda Team	Honda	28	43:43.524	8	25
2	46	(Italy) Valentino Rossi	Movistar Yamaha MotoGP	Yamaha	28	+2.837	2	20
3	99	(Spain) Jorge Lorenzo	Movistar Yamaha MotoGP	Yamaha	28	+4.359	1	16
4	93	(Spain) Marc Márquez	Repsol Honda Team	Honda	28	+9.569	4	13
5	25	(Spain) Maverick Viñales	Team Suzuki Ecstar	Suzuki	28	+15.467	3	11
6	4	(Italy) Andrea Dovizioso	Ducati Team	Ducati	28	+19.676	6	10
7	51	(Italy) Michele Pirro	Ducati Team	Ducati	28	+22.936	5	9
8	35	(United Kingdom) Cal Crutchlow	LCR Honda	Honda	28	+25.702	7	8
9	44	(Spain) Pol Espargaró	Monster Yamaha Tech 3	Yamaha	28	+27.155	10	7
10	19	(Spain) Álvaro Bautista	Aprilia Racing Team Gresini	Aprilia	28	+33.968	12	6
11	9	(Italy) Danilo Petrucci	Octo Pramac Yakhnich	Ducati	28	+39.206	15	5
12	6	(Germany) Stefan Bradl	Aprilia Racing Team Gresini	Aprilia	28	+39.967	13	4
13	8	(Spain) Héctor Barberá	Avintia Racing	Ducati	28	+42.997	11	3
14	50	(Republic of Ireland) Eugene Laverty	Pull & Bear Aspar Team	Ducati	28	+49.450	16	2
15	45	(United Kingdom) Scott Redding	Octo Pramac Yakhnich	Ducati	28	+54.879 (Note: 0.5-second penalty.)	17	1
16	68	(Colombia) Yonny Hernández	Pull & Bear Aspar Team	Ducati	28	+1:05.072	19	
17	53	(Spain) Tito Rabat	Estrella Galicia 0,0 Marc VDS	Honda	23	+5 laps	18	
Ret	41	(Spain) Aleix Espargaró	Team Suzuki Ecstar	Suzuki	17	Accident Damage	9	
Ret	12	(Spain) Javier Forés	Avintia Racing	Ducati	15	Arm Pump	20	
Ret	22	(United Kingdom) Alex Lowes	Monster Yamaha Tech 3	Yamaha	7	Accident	14	
DNS	43	(Australia) Jack Miller	Estrella Galicia 0,0 Marc VDS	Honda		Did not start		
Sources:

- Jack Miller withdrew from the race due to pain in his right hand.

=== Moto2 ===
Pos.	No.	Rider	Manufacturer	Laps	Time/Retired	Grid	Points
1	7	(Italy) Lorenzo Baldassarri	Kalex	26	42:45.885	3	25
2	40	(Spain) Álex Rins	Kalex	26	+2.523	8	20
3	30	(Japan) Takaaki Nakagami	Kalex	26	+6.199	2	16
4	5	(France) Johann Zarco	Kalex	26	+8.942	1	13
5	21	(Italy) Franco Morbidelli	Kalex	26	+10.016	5	11
6	12	(Switzerland) Thomas Lüthi	Kalex	26	+11.095	6	10
7	55	(Malaysia) Hafizh Syahrin	Kalex	26	+13.048	10	9
8	94	(Germany) Jonas Folger	Kalex	26	+14.604	11	8
9	11	(Germany) Sandro Cortese	Kalex	26	+15.647	7	7
10	73	(Spain) Álex Márquez	Kalex	26	+20.720	12	6
11	23	(Germany) Marcel Schrötter	Kalex	26	+22.195	13	5
12	97	(Spain) Xavi Vierge	Tech 3	26	+33.627	25	4
13	10	(Italy) Luca Marini	Kalex	26	+40.136	21	3
14	14	(Thailand) Ratthapark Wilairot	Kalex	26	+41.752	18	2
15	2	(Switzerland) Jesko Raffin	Kalex	26	+42.502	23	1
16	54	(Italy) Mattia Pasini	Kalex	26	+49.745	9	
17	44	(Portugal) Miguel Oliveira	Kalex	26	+1:02.022	22	
18	42	(Italy) Federico Fuligni	Kalex	26	+1:03.931	27	
19	87	(Australia) Remy Gardner	Kalex	26	+1:04.010	28	
20	70	(Switzerland) Robin Mulhauser	Kalex	26	+1:07.383	29	
21	27	(Spain) Iker Lecuona	Kalex	26	+1:20.046	24	
Ret	57	(Spain) Edgar Pons	Kalex	23	Accident	20	
Ret	60	(Spain) Julián Simón	Speed Up	21	Accident Damage	14	
Ret	22	(United Kingdom) Sam Lowes	Kalex	12	Accident	4	
Ret	52	(United Kingdom) Danny Kent	Kalex	7	Accident	15	
Ret	32	(Spain) Isaac Viñales	Tech 3	3	Shoulder Pain	26	
Ret	24	(Italy) Simone Corsi	Speed Up	1	Accident	17	
Ret	49	(Spain) Axel Pons	Kalex	0	Accident	16	
Ret	19	(Belgium) Xavier Siméon	Speed Up	0	Accident	19	
OFFICIAL MOTO2 REPORT

=== Moto3 ===
Pos.	No.	Rider	Manufacturer	Laps	Time/Retired	Grid	Points
1	41	(South Africa) Brad Binder	KTM	23	39:37.556	1	25
2	33	(Italy) Enea Bastianini	Honda	23	+0.262	2	20
3	36	(Spain) Joan Mir	KTM	23	+1.416	15	16
4	8	(Italy) Nicolò Bulega	KTM	23	+1.534	3	13
5	84	(Czech Republic) Jakub Kornfeil	Honda	23	+4.278	4	11
6	55	(Italy) Andrea Locatelli	KTM	23	+4.387	12	10
7	44	(Spain) Arón Canet	Honda	23	+4.811	6	9
8	65	(Germany) Philipp Öttl	KTM	23	+5.582	7	8
9	76	(Japan) Hiroki Ono	Honda	23	+6.259	8	7
10	4	(Italy) Fabio Di Giannantonio	Honda	23	+10.896	10	6
11	23	(Italy) Niccolò Antonelli	Honda	23	+13.939	13	5
12	58	(Spain) Juan Francisco Guevara	KTM	23	+14.091	9	4
13	11	(Belgium) Livio Loi	Honda	23	+14.103	17	3
14	95	(France) Jules Danilo	Honda	23	+14.810	14	2
15	16	(Italy) Andrea Migno	KTM	23	+14.868	21	1
16	62	(Italy) Stefano Manzi	Mahindra	23	+23.292	19	
17	48	(Italy) Lorenzo Dalla Porta	KTM	23	+23.349	16	
18	20	(France) Fabio Quartararo	KTM	23	+23.523	18	
19	12	(Spain) Albert Arenas	Peugeot	23	+31.140	25	
20	17	(United Kingdom) John McPhee	Peugeot	23	+35.145	28	
21	21	(Italy) Francesco Bagnaia	Mahindra	23	+35.170	24	
22	89	(Malaysia) Khairul Idham Pawi	Honda	23	+35.409	26	
23	7	(Malaysia) Adam Norrodin	Honda	23	+35.467	23	
24	77	(Italy) Lorenzo Petrarca	Mahindra	23	+48.285	32	
25	3	(Italy) Fabio Spiranelli	Mahindra	23	+56.451	34	
26	43	(Italy) Stefano Valtulini	Mahindra	23	+56.486	33	
Ret	40	(South Africa) Darryn Binder	Mahindra	19	Retirement	29	
Ret	24	(Japan) Tatsuki Suzuki	Mahindra	15	Accident	31	
Ret	42	(Spain) Marcos Ramírez	Mahindra	13	Gear Shifter	27	
Ret	9	(Spain) Jorge Navarro	Honda	7	Accident	5	
Ret	19	(Argentina) Gabriel Rodrigo	KTM	6	Accident	11	
Ret	6	(Spain) María Herrera	KTM	1	Accident	22	
Ret	64	(Netherlands) Bo Bendsneyder	KTM	0	Accident	20	
Ret	71	(San Marino) Alex Fabbri	Mahindra	0	Accident	30	
DNS	88	(Spain) Jorge Martín	Mahindra		Did not start		
OFFICIAL MOTO3 REPORT

- Jorge Martin suffered a broken foot in a crash during qualifying.

== Championship standings after the race (MotoGP) ==
Below are the standings for the top five riders and constructors after round thirteen has concluded.

Riders' Championship standings

Pos.	Rider	Points
1	(Spain) Marc Marquez	223
2	(Italy) Valentino Rossi	180
3	(Spain) Jorge Lorenzo	162
4	(Spain) Dani Pedrosa	145
5	(Spain) Maverick Vinales	136

Constructors' Championship standings

Pos.	Constructor	Points
1	(Japan) Honda	266
2	(Japan) Yamaha	258
3	(Italy) Ducati	182
4	(Japan) Suzuki	142
5	(Italy) Aprilia	65

- Note: Only the top five positions are included for both sets of standings.

== Notes ==
Previous race: 2016 British Grand Prix	FIM Grand Prix World Championship; 2016 season	Next race: 2016 Aragon Grand Prix
Previous race: 2015 San Marino Grand Prix	San Marino and Rimini Riviera motorcycle Grand Prix	Next race: 2017 San Marino Grand Prix
