= 2015 Supersport World Championship =

Sports competition

2015 Supersport World Championship
Previous:	2014	Next:	2016
Support series: Superbike World Championship; FIM Superstock 1000 Cup; European Superstock 600 Championship; European Junior Cup

The 2015 Supersport World Championship was the seventeenth season of the Supersport World Championship—the nineteenth taking into account the two held under the name of Supersport World Series. Kenan Sofuoğlu claimed the title for the fourth time in the championship's history with one race to spare.

== Race calendar and results ==
2015 calendar
Round	Country	Circuit	Date	Pole position	Fastest lap	Winning rider	Winning team
1	Australia	Phillip Island Grand Prix Circuit	22 February	(France) Jules Cluzel	(Turkey) Kenan Sofuoğlu	(France) Jules Cluzel	MV Agusta Reparto Corse
2	Thailand	Chang International Circuit	22 March	(Turkey) Kenan Sofuoğlu	(France) Jules Cluzel	(Thailand) Ratthapark Wilairot	Core" Motorsport Thailand
3	Spain	Motorland Aragón	12 April	(France) Jules Cluzel	(United States) P. J. Jacobsen	(Turkey) Kenan Sofuoğlu	Kawasaki Puccetti Racing
4	Netherlands	TT Circuit Assen	19 April	(France) Jules Cluzel	(France) Jules Cluzel	(Turkey) Kenan Sofuoğlu	Kawasaki Puccetti Racing
5	Italy	Autodromo Enzo e Dino Ferrari	10 May	(France) Jules Cluzel	(France) Jules Cluzel	(Turkey) Kenan Sofuoğlu	Kawasaki Puccetti Racing
6	United Kingdom	Donington Park	24 May	(Turkey) Kenan Sofuoğlu	(France) Jules Cluzel	(Turkey) Kenan Sofuoğlu	Kawasaki Puccetti Racing
7	Portugal	Autódromo Internacional do Algarve	7 June	(France) Jules Cluzel	(Turkey) Kenan Sofuoğlu	(France) Jules Cluzel	MV Agusta Reparto Corse
8	Italy	Misano World Circuit Marco Simoncelli	21 June	(France) Jules Cluzel	(France) Jules Cluzel	(France) Jules Cluzel	MV Agusta Reparto Corse
9	Malaysia	Sepang International Circuit	2 August	(United States) P. J. Jacobsen	(Turkey) Kenan Sofuoğlu	(United States) P. J. Jacobsen	Core" Motorsport Thailand
10	Spain	Circuito de Jerez	20 September	(Turkey) Kenan Sofuoğlu	(United States) P. J. Jacobsen	(Turkey) Kenan Sofuoğlu	Kawasaki Puccetti Racing
11	France	Circuit de Nevers Magny-Cours	4 October	(United States) P. J. Jacobsen	(United States) P. J. Jacobsen	(United States) P. J. Jacobsen	Core" Motorsport Thailand
12	Qatar	Losail International Circuit	18 October	(Turkey) Kenan Sofuoğlu	(United Kingdom) Kyle Smith	(United Kingdom) Kyle Smith	Pata Honda World Supersport Team

== Entry list ==
2015 entry list
Team	Constructor	Motorcycle	No.	Rider	Rounds
AARK Racing	Honda	Honda CBR600RR	68	(Australia) Glenn Scott	All
A.P. Honda Racing Thailand	Honda	Honda CBR600RR	27	(Thailand) Thitipong Warokorn	2
A.P. Honda Racing Thailand	Honda	Honda CBR600RR	59	(Thailand) Ratthapong Wilairot	2
CIA Landlords Insurance Honda	Honda	Honda CBR600RR	4	(United Kingdom) Gino Rea	All
CIA Landlords Insurance Honda	Honda	Honda CBR600RR	35	(United Kingdom) Stefan Hill	12
CIA Landlords Insurance Honda	Honda	Honda CBR600RR	36	(Colombia) Martín Cárdenas	1–11
CIA Landlords Insurance Honda	Honda	Honda CBR600RR	41	(Australia) Aiden Wagner	9–12
CIA Landlords Insurance Honda	Honda	Honda CBR600RR	43	(Italy) Kevin Manfredi	8, 10–12
CIA Landlords Insurance Honda	Honda	Honda CBR600RR	59	(Thailand) Ratthapong Wilairot	9
CIA Landlords Insurance Honda	Honda	Honda CBR600RR	74	(United Kingdom) Kieran Clarke	1–6
CIA Landlords Insurance Honda	Honda	Honda CBR600RR	84	(Italy) Riccardo Russo	1–8
CIA Landlords Insurance Honda	Honda	Honda CBR600RR	117	(Portugal) Miguel Praia	7
Core" Motorsport Thailand	Honda	Honda CBR600RR	9	(Thailand) Ratthapark Wilairot	1–5
Core" Motorsport Thailand	Honda	Honda CBR600RR	67	(United Kingdom) Andy Reid	6
Core" Motorsport Thailand	Honda	Honda CBR600RR	99	(United States) P. J. Jacobsen	7–12
Orelac Racing Team	Honda	Honda CBR600RR	10	(Spain) Nacho Calero	3–12
Pata Honda World Supersport Team	Honda	Honda CBR600RR	111	(United Kingdom) Kyle Smith	All
Schmidt Racing	Honda	Honda CBR600RR	92	(Hungary) Dávid Juhász	8, 10–11
Schmidt Racing	Honda	Honda CBR600RR	119	(Hungary) János Chrobák	8, 10–11
SMS Racing	Honda	Honda CBR600RR	19	(Germany) Kevin Wahr	All
Team Lorini	Honda	Honda CBR600RR	20	(Australia) Alex Phillis	1
Team Lorini	Honda	Honda CBR600RR	24	(Spain) Marcos Ramírez	6–10
Team Lorini	Honda	Honda CBR600RR	31	(Spain) Sergio Gadea	12
Team Lorini	Honda	Honda CBR600RR	44	(Italy) Roberto Rolfo	All
Team Lorini	Honda	Honda CBR600RR	69	(Italy) Luigi Morciano	3–4
Team Lorini	Honda	Honda CBR600RR	81	(Italy) Alessandro Nocco	2, 5
Team Lorini	Honda	Honda CBR600RR	96	(Spain) Xavier Pinsach	11
Catbike/exit	Kawasaki	Kawasaki ZX-6R	10	(Spain) Nacho Calero	1
Catbike/exit	Kawasaki	Kawasaki ZX-6R	24	(Spain) Marcos Ramírez	1
Catbike/exit	Kawasaki	Kawasaki ZX-6R	34	(Argentina) Ezequiel Iturrioz	3–7
Kawasaki Intermoto Ponyexpres	Kawasaki	Kawasaki ZX-6R	14	(France) Lucas Mahias	1–6
Kawasaki Intermoto Ponyexpres	Kawasaki	Kawasaki ZX-6R	41	(Australia) Aiden Wagner	5–6
Kawasaki Intermoto Ponyexpres	Kawasaki	Kawasaki ZX-6R	99	(United States) P. J. Jacobsen	1–6
Renzi Corse Srl SSD	Kawasaki	Kawasaki ZX-6R	33	(Italy) Flavio Ferroni	8
San Carlo Puccetti Racing; Kawasaki Puccetti Racing	Kawasaki	Kawasaki ZX-6R	5	(Italy) Marco Faccani	All
San Carlo Puccetti Racing; Kawasaki Puccetti Racing	Kawasaki	Kawasaki ZX-6R	54	(Turkey) Kenan Sofuoğlu	All
San Carlo Puccetti Racing; Kawasaki Puccetti Racing	Kawasaki	Kawasaki ZX-6R	181	(Saudi Arabia) Abdulaziz Binladin	12
Team Go Eleven	Kawasaki	Kawasaki ZX-6R	6	(Switzerland) Dominic Schmitter	All
Team Go Eleven	Kawasaki	Kawasaki ZX-6R	11	(Italy) Christian Gamarino	All
GRT Racing Team	MV Agusta	MV Agusta F3 675	95	(Czech Republic) Miroslav Popov	10
MV Agusta Reparto Corse	MV Agusta	MV Agusta F3 675	16	(France) Jules Cluzel	1–9 (Note: Jules Cluzel was also entered into the Jerez round but was replaced by Nicolás Terol after two practice sessions due to injury.)
MV Agusta Reparto Corse	MV Agusta	MV Agusta F3 675	87	(Italy) Lorenzo Zanetti	All
MV Agusta Reparto Corse	MV Agusta	MV Agusta F3 675	88	(Spain) Nicolás Terol	10–12
Race Department ATK#25	MV Agusta	MV Agusta F3 675	25	(Italy) Alex Baldolini	All
Team Factory Vamag	MV Agusta	MV Agusta F3 675	53	(Italy) Nicola Jr. Morrentino	10
Yohann Moto Sport	Suzuki	Suzuki GSX-R600	23	(France) Cédric Tangre	11
Profile Racing	Triumph	Triumph 675 R	80	(United Kingdom) Luke Stapleford	6
Profile Racing	Triumph	Triumph 675 R	94	(United Kingdom) Sam Hornsey	6
Sam Lambert Racing	Triumph	Triumph Daytona 675	17	(Australia) Sam Lambert	1
Autos Arroyo Pastrana Racing Team	Yamaha	Yamaha YZF-R6	24	(Spain) Marcos Ramírez	3
Autos Arroyo Pastrana Racing Team	Yamaha	Yamaha YZF-R6	42	(Spain) Jorge Arroyo	3
Autos Arroyo Pastrana Racing Team	Yamaha	Yamaha YZF-R6	89	(Spain) Christian Palomares	10
DMC Racing	Yamaha	Yamaha YZF-R6	52	(Russia) Vladimir Leonov	10
DMC Racing	Yamaha	Yamaha YZF-R6	161	(Russia) Alexey Ivanov	3, 6, 8
Kallio Racing	Yamaha	Yamaha YZF-R6	38	(Estonia) Hannes Soomer	11
Kallio Racing	Yamaha	Yamaha YZF-R6	66	(Finland) Niki Tuuli	6
MG Competition	Yamaha	Yamaha YZF-R6	14	(France) Lucas Mahias	10–12
Oz Wildcard Racing	Yamaha	Yamaha YZF-R6	41	(Australia) Aiden Wagner	1
Pacedayz European TrackDays	Yamaha	Yamaha YZF-R6	77	(United Kingdom) Kyle Ryde	6
Pladas Racing	Yamaha	Yamaha YZF-R6	13	(Lithuania) Šarūnas Pladas	10
VFT Racing	Yamaha	Yamaha YZF-R6	61	(Italy) Fabio Menghi	All
Yamaha Thailand Racing Team	Yamaha	Yamaha YZF-R6	30	(Thailand) Decha Kraisart	2
Yamaha Thailand Racing Team	Yamaha	Yamaha YZF-R6	65	(Thailand) Chalermpol Polamai	2

Key
Regular rider
Wildcard rider
Replacement rider

- All entries used Pirelli tyres.

== Championship standings ==
=== Riders' championship ===
Pos.	Rider	Bike	PHI (Australia)	CHA (Thailand)	ARA (Spain)	ASS (Netherlands)	IMO (Italy)	DON (United Kingdom)	POR (Portugal)	MIS (Italy)	SEP (Malaysia)	JER (Spain)	MAG (France)	LOS (Qatar)	Pts
1	(Turkey) Kenan Sofuoğlu	Kawasaki	6	**2**	1	1	1	**1**	2	11	4	**1**	2	**2**	233
2	(United States) P. J. Jacobsen	Kawasaki	10	3	2	4	4	5							196
2	(United States) P. J. Jacobsen	Honda							3	2	**1**	2	**1**	5	196
3	(Italy) Lorenzo Zanetti	MV Agusta	2	Ret	5	6	3	4	5	3	3	3	4	3	158
4	(France) Jules Cluzel	MV Agusta	**1**	Ret	**Ret**	**2**	**2**	2	**1**	**1**	2	WD			155
5	(United Kingdom) Kyle Smith	Honda	4	Ret	3	3	15	Ret	6	Ret	5	4	5	1	116
6	(United Kingdom) Gino Rea	Honda	3	10	4	14	7	8	4	4	8	Ret	7	Ret	97
7	(Italy) Roberto Rolfo	Honda	8	6	10	5	10	11	8	12	6	10	11	7	88
8	(Italy) Alex Baldolini	MV Agusta	7	9	6	9	Ret	Ret	Ret	5	10	7	Ret	8	67
9	(Italy) Marco Faccani	Kawasaki	12	7	Ret	8	5	Ret	12	9	16	6	10	9	66
10	(Italy) Christian Gamarino	Kawasaki	11	13	9	Ret	11	14	7	7	9	8	9	Ret	62
11	(Colombia) Martín Cárdenas	Honda	Ret	8	Ret	11	9	13	9	10	7	14	8		55
12	(France) Lucas Mahias	Kawasaki	Ret	4	Ret	7	Ret	Ret							51
12	(France) Lucas Mahias	Yamaha										Ret	3	4	51
13	(Thailand) Ratthapark Wilairot	Honda	5	1	Ret	19	6								46
14	(Switzerland) Dominic Schmitter	Kawasaki	9	15	8	13	13	Ret	14	13	11	11	12	11	46
15	(Italy) Fabio Menghi	Yamaha	15	Ret	7	12	12	Ret	10	6	12	Ret	20	10	44
16	(Italy) Riccardo Russo	Honda	Ret	Ret	11	10	8	12	Ret	8					31
17	(Germany) Kevin Wahr	Honda	16	12	12	Ret	Ret	Ret	Ret	14	13	9	6	Ret	30
18	(Spain) Nicolás Terol	MV Agusta										5	14	6	23
19	(United Kingdom) Kyle Ryde	Yamaha						3							16
20	(Australia) Aiden Wagner	Yamaha	13												13
20	(Australia) Aiden Wagner	Kawasaki					14	Ret							13
20	(Australia) Aiden Wagner	Honda									14	13	13	Ret	13
21	(Spain) Marcos Ramírez	Kawasaki	19												12
21	(Spain) Marcos Ramírez	Yamaha			14										12
21	(Spain) Marcos Ramírez	Honda						17	11	Ret	15	12			12
22	(Thailand) Ratthapong Wilairot	Honda		5							17				11
23	(United Kingdom) Luke Stapleford	Triumph						6							10
24	(United Kingdom) Sam Hornsey	Triumph						7							9
25	(Australia) Glenn Scott	Honda	14	14	18	Ret	Ret	16	13	15	Ret	16	19	DNS	8
26	(Finland) Niki Tuuli	Yamaha						9							7
27	(United Kingdom) Andy Reid	Honda						10							6
28	(Thailand) Decha Kraisart	Yamaha		11											5
29	(Spain) Sergio Gadea	Honda												12	4
30	(Spain) Nacho Calero	Kawasaki	Ret												3
30	(Spain) Nacho Calero	Honda			17	17	Ret	18	16	17	18	20	22	13	3
31	(Russia) Alexey Ivanov	Yamaha			13			Ret		Ret					3
32	(Saudi Arabia) Abdulaziz Binladin	Kawasaki												14	2
33	(Italy) Luigi Morciano	Honda			15	15									2
34	(Italy) Kevin Manfredi	Honda								18		Ret	DNS	15	1
35	(Spain) Xavier Pinsach	Honda											15		1
36	(Hungary) János Chrobák	Honda								Ret		15	17		1
37	(Portugal) Miguel Praia	Honda							15						1
38	(United Kingdom) Kieran Clarke	Honda	18	Ret	16	16	16	15							1
	(United Kingdom) Stefan Hill	Honda												16	0
	(France) Cédric Tangre	Suzuki											16		0
	(Hungary) Dávid Juhász	Honda								16		19	18		0
	(Thailand) Thitipong Warokorn	Honda		16											0
	(Spain) Christian Palomares	Yamaha										17			0
	(Argentina) Ezequiel Iturrioz	Kawasaki			20	18	17	Ret	DNS						0
	(Australia) Alex Phillis	Honda	17												0
	(Czech Republic) Miroslav Popov	MV Agusta										18			0
	(Italy) Flavio Ferroni	Kawasaki								19					0
	(Spain) Jorge Arroyo	Yamaha			19										0
	(Estonia) Hannes Soomer	Yamaha											21		0
	(Lithuania) Šarūnas Pladas	Yamaha										21			0
	(Russia) Vladimir Leonov	Yamaha										Ret			0
	(Italy) Nicola Jr. Morrentino	MV Agusta										Ret			0
	(Thailand) Chalermpol Polamai	Yamaha		Ret											0
	(Italy) Alessandro Nocco	Honda		DNS			DNS								0
	(Australia) Sam Lambert	Triumph	DNS												0
Pos.	Rider	Bike	PHI (Australia)	CHA (Thailand)	ARA (Spain)	ASS (Netherlands)	IMO (Italy)	DON (United Kingdom)	POR (Portugal)	MIS (Italy)	SEP (Malaysia)	JER (Spain)	MAG (France)	LOS (Qatar)	Pts

Colour	Result
Gold	Winner
Silver	Second place
Bronze	Third place
Green	Points classification
Blue	Non-points classification
Blue	Non-classified finish (NC)
Purple	Retired, not classified (Ret)
Red	Did not qualify (DNQ)
Red	Did not pre-qualify (DNPQ)
Black	Disqualified (DSQ)
White	Did not start (DNS)
White	Withdrew (WD)
White	Race cancelled (C)
Blank	Did not practice (DNP)
Blank	Did not arrive (DNA)
Blank	Excluded (EX)

**Bold** – Pole position
Italics – Fastest lap

=== Teams' championship ===
Pos.	Teams	Bike No.	PHI (Australia)	CHA (Thailand)	ARA (Spain)	ASS (Netherlands)	IMO (Italy)	DON (United Kingdom)	POR (Portugal)	MIS (Italy)	SEP (Malaysia)	JER (Spain)	MAG (France)	LOS (Qatar)	Pts.
1	(Italy) MV Agusta Reparto Corse	87	2	Ret	5	6	3	4	5	3	3	3	4	3	336
1	(Italy) MV Agusta Reparto Corse	16	**1**	Ret	**Ret**	**2**	**2**	2	**1**	**1**	2	WD			336
1	(Italy) MV Agusta Reparto Corse	88										5	14	6	336
2	(Italy) San Carlo Kawasaki Puccetti Racing	54	6	**2**	1	1	1	**1**	2	11	4	**1**	2	**2**	301
2	(Italy) San Carlo Kawasaki Puccetti Racing	5	12	7	Ret	8	5	Ret	12	9	16	6	10	9	301
2	(Italy) San Carlo Kawasaki Puccetti Racing	181												14	301
3	(United Kingdom) CIA Landlord Insurance Honda	4	3	10	4	14	7	8	4	4	8	Ret	7	Ret	169
3	(United Kingdom) CIA Landlord Insurance Honda	36	Ret	8	Ret	11	9	13	9	10	7	14	8		169
3	(United Kingdom) CIA Landlord Insurance Honda	84	Ret	Ret	11	10	8	12	Ret	8					169
3	(United Kingdom) CIA Landlord Insurance Honda	41									14	13	13	Ret	169
3	(United Kingdom) CIA Landlord Insurance Honda	43								18		Ret	DNS	15	169
3	(United Kingdom) CIA Landlord Insurance Honda	74	18	Ret	16	16	16	15							169
3	(United Kingdom) CIA Landlord Insurance Honda	117							15						169
3	(United Kingdom) CIA Landlord Insurance Honda	35												16	169
3	(United Kingdom) CIA Landlord Insurance Honda	59									17				169
4	CORE" Motorsport Thailand	99							3	2	**1**	2	**1**	5	169
4	CORE" Motorsport Thailand	9	5	1	Ret	19	6								169
4	CORE" Motorsport Thailand	67						10							169
5	(Netherlands) Pata Honda World Supersport Team	111	4	Ret	3	3	15	Ret	6	Ret	5	4	5	1	116
6	(Italy) Team Go Eleven	11	11	13	9	Ret	11	14	7	7	9	8	9	Ret	108
6	(Italy) Team Go Eleven	6	9	15	8	13	13	Ret	14	13	11	11	12	11	108
7	(Italy) Team Lorini	44	8	6	10	5	10	11	8	12	6	10	11	7	105
7	(Italy) Team Lorini	24						17	11	Ret	15	12			105
7	(Italy) Team Lorini	31												12	105
7	(Italy) Team Lorini	69			15	15									105
7	(Italy) Team Lorini	96											15		105
7	(Italy) Team Lorini	20	17												105
7	(Italy) Team Lorini	81		DNS			DNS								105
8	(Italy) Kawasaki Intermoto Ponyexpres	99	10	3	2	4	4	5							103
8	(Italy) Kawasaki Intermoto Ponyexpres	14	Ret	4	Ret	7	Ret	Ret							103
8	(Italy) Kawasaki Intermoto Ponyexpres	41					14	Ret							103
9	(Spain) Race Department ATK#25	25	7	9	6	9	Ret	Ret	Ret	5	10	7	Ret	8	67
10	(Italy) VFT Racing	61	15	Ret	7	12	12	Ret	10	6	12	Ret	20	10	44
11	(Germany) SMS Racing	19	16	12	12	Ret	Ret	Ret	Ret	14	13	9	6	Ret	30
12	(France) MG Competition	14										Ret	3	4	29
13	(United Kingdom) Profile Racing	80						6							19
13	(United Kingdom) Profile Racing	94						7							19
14	(United Kingdom) Pacedayz European TrackDays	77						3							16
15	A.P. Honda Racing Thailand	59		5											11
15	A.P. Honda Racing Thailand	27		16											11
16	(Australia) AARK Racing	68	14	14	18	Ret	Ret	16	13	15	Ret	16	19	DNS	8
17	(Finland) Kallio Racing	66						9							7
17	(Finland) Kallio Racing	38											21		7
18	Yaamaha Thailand Racing Team	30		11											5
18	Yaamaha Thailand Racing Team	65		Ret											5
19	(Australia) Oz Wildcard Racing	41	13												3
20	(Russia) DMC Racing	161			13			Ret		Ret					3
20	(Russia) DMC Racing	52										Ret			3
21	(Spain) Orelac Racing Team	10			17	17	Ret	18	16	17	18	20	22	13	3
22	(Spain) Autos Arroyo Pastrana Racing Team	24			14										2
22	(Spain) Autos Arroyo Pastrana Racing Team	89										17			2
22	(Spain) Autos Arroyo Pastrana Racing Team	42			19										2
23	(Hungary) Schmidt Racing	119								Ret		15	17		1
23	(Hungary) Schmidt Racing	92								16		19	18		1
	(France) Yohann Moto Sport	23											16		0
	(Spain) Catbike/exit	34			20	18	17	Ret	DNS						0
	(Spain) Catbike/exit	24	19												0
	(Spain) Catbike/exit	10	Ret												0
	(Italy) GRT Racing Team	95										18			0
	(Italy) Renzi Corse Srl SSD	33								19					0
	(Lithuania) Pladas Racing	13										21			0
	(Italy) Team Factory Vamag	53										Ret			0
	(Australia) Sam Lambert Racing	17	DNS												0
Pos.	Teams	Bike No.	PHI (Australia)	CHA (Thailand)	ARA (Spain)	ASS (Netherlands)	IMO (Italy)	DON (United Kingdom)	POR (Portugal)	MIS (Italy)	SEP (Malaysia)	JER (Spain)	MAG (France)	LOS (Qatar)	Pts.

=== Manufacturers' championship ===
Pos.	Manufacturer	PHI (Australia)	CHA (Thailand)	ARA (Spain)	ASS (Netherlands)	IMO (Italy)	DON (United Kingdom)	POR (Portugal)	MIS (Italy)	SEP (Malaysia)	JER (Spain)	MAG (France)	LOS (Qatar)	Pts
1	(Japan) Kawasaki	6	2	1	1	1	1	2	7	4	1	2	2	237
2	(Japan) Honda	3	1	3	3	6	8	3	2	1	2	1	1	222
3	(Italy) MV Agusta	1	9	5	2	2	2	1	1	2	3	4	3	218
4	(Japan) Yamaha	13	11	7	12	12	3	10	6	12	17	3	4	90
5	(United Kingdom) Triumph	DNS					6							10
	(Japan) Suzuki											16		0
Pos.	Manufacturer	PHI (Australia)	CHA (Thailand)	ARA (Spain)	ASS (Netherlands)	IMO (Italy)	DON (United Kingdom)	POR (Portugal)	MIS (Italy)	SEP (Malaysia)	JER (Spain)	MAG (France)	LOS (Qatar)	Pts
