= 2010 British motorcycle Grand Prix =

5th round of the 2010 FIM Road Racing World Championship season

(United Kingdom) 2010 British Grand Prix
Race details
- Race 5 of 18 races in the 2010 Grand Prix motorcycle racing season
- Date: 20 June 2010
- Official name: AirAsia British Grand Prix
- Location: Silverstone Circuit
- Course: Permanent racing facility; 5.902 km (3.667 mi)

MotoGP
Pole position
- Rider: (Spain) Jorge Lorenzo
- Time: 2:03.308
Fastest lap
- Rider: (Spain) Jorge Lorenzo
- Time: 2:03.526 on lap 4
Podium
- First: (Spain) Jorge Lorenzo
- Second: (Italy) Andrea Dovizioso
- Third: (United States) Ben Spies

Moto2
Pole position
- Rider: (Italy) Claudio Corti
- Time: 2:09.624
Fastest lap
- Rider: (Switzerland) Thomas Lüthi
- Time: 2:09.886 on lap 12
Podium
- First: (France) Jules Cluzel
- Second: (Switzerland) Thomas Lüthi
- Third: (Spain) Julián Simón

125cc
Pole position
- Rider: (Spain) Marc Márquez
- Time: 2:14.667
Fastest lap
- Rider: (Spain) Pol Espargaró
- Time: 2:13.781 on lap 14
Podium
- First: (Spain) Marc Márquez
- Second: (Spain) Pol Espargaró
- Third: (United Kingdom) Bradley Smith

The 2010 British motorcycle Grand Prix was the fifth round of the 2010 Grand Prix motorcycle racing season. It took place on the weekend of 18–20 June 2010 at Silverstone. It was the first event Valentino Rossi missed since his debut in 1996, due to a shin bone fracture at Mugello in practice for the previous Grand Prix.

Jorge Lorenzo dominated the MotoGP race, finishing nearly seven seconds clear of a battle for second place. Andrea Dovizioso won the battle for second, with Ben Spies passing countryman Nicky Hayden for third on the last lap to get his first ever MotoGP podium, and Casey Stoner recovered from a terrible start which left him last at the first corner to finish fifth ahead of front row starter Randy de Puniet.

== MotoGP classification ==
Pos.	No.	Rider	Team	Manufacturer	Laps	Time/Retired	Grid	Points
1	99	(Spain) Jorge Lorenzo	Fiat Yamaha Team	Yamaha	20	41:34.083	1	25
2	4	(Italy) Andrea Dovizioso	Repsol Honda Team	Honda	20	+6.743	4	20
3	11	(United States) Ben Spies	Monster Yamaha Tech 3	Yamaha	20	+7.097	7	16
4	69	(United States) Nicky Hayden	Ducati Team	Ducati	20	+7.314	5	13
5	27	(Australia) Casey Stoner	Ducati Team	Ducati	20	+7.494	6	11
6	14	(France) Randy de Puniet	LCR Honda MotoGP	Honda	20	+9.055	2	10
7	58	(Italy) Marco Simoncelli	San Carlo Honda Gresini	Honda	20	+14.425	9	9
8	26	(Spain) Dani Pedrosa	Repsol Honda Team	Honda	20	+15.313	3	8
9	5	(United States) Colin Edwards	Monster Yamaha Tech 3	Yamaha	20	+27.954	10	7
10	41	(Spain) Aleix Espargaró	Pramac Racing Team	Ducati	20	+42.394	12	6
11	40	(Spain) Héctor Barberá	Páginas Amarillas Aspar	Ducati	20	+43.365	11	5
12	19	(Spain) Álvaro Bautista	Rizla Suzuki MotoGP	Suzuki	20	+43.408	14	4
13	36	(Finland) Mika Kallio	Pramac Racing Team	Ducati	20	+43.580	15	3
Ret	65	(Italy) Loris Capirossi	Rizla Suzuki MotoGP	Suzuki	13	Accident	13	
Ret	33	(Italy) Marco Melandri	San Carlo Honda Gresini	Honda	0	Accident	8	
DNS	7	(Japan) Hiroshi Aoyama	Interwetten Honda MotoGP	Honda		Did not start		

== Moto2 classification ==
Pos.	No.	Rider	Manufacturer	Laps	Time/Retired	Grid	Points
1	16	(France) Jules Cluzel	Suter	18	39:19.472	2	25
2	12	(Switzerland) Thomas Lüthi	Moriwaki	18	+0.057	9	20
3	60	(Spain) Julián Simón	Suter	18	+0.322	4	16
4	45	(United Kingdom) Scott Redding	Suter	18	+0.520	12	13
5	6	(Spain) Alex Debón	FTR	18	+5.271	17	11
6	48	(Japan) Shoya Tomizawa	Suter	18	+5.377	11	10
7	63	(France) Mike Di Meglio	Suter	18	+5.484	31	9
8	19	(Belgium) Xavier Siméon	Moriwaki	18	+5.709	6	8
9	77	(Switzerland) Dominique Aegerter	Suter	18	+10.240	13	7
10	24	(Spain) Toni Elías	Moriwaki	18	+10.411	18	6
11	10	(Spain) Fonsi Nieto	Moriwaki	18	+10.701	10	5
12	29	(Italy) Andrea Iannone	Speed Up	18	+10.741	16	4
13	14	(Thailand) Ratthapark Wilairot	Bimota	18	+10.959	24	3
14	41	(Germany) Arne Tode	Suter	18	+16.062	8	2
15	40	(Spain) Sergio Gadea	Pons Kalex	18	+16.161	22	1
16	59	(Italy) Niccolò Canepa	Force GP210	18	+24.118	26	
17	8	(Australia) Anthony West	MZ-RE Honda	18	+29.563	33	
18	72	(Japan) Yuki Takahashi	Tech 3	18	+29.952	38	
19	61	(Ukraine) Vladimir Ivanov	Moriwaki	18	+30.218	34	
20	52	(Czech Republic) Lukáš Pešek	Moriwaki	18	+31.289	25	
21	9	(United States) Kenny Noyes	Promoharris	18	+31.423	23	
22	54	(United Kingdom) Kev Coghlan	FTR	18	+31.715	30	
23	80	(Spain) Axel Pons	Pons Kalex	18	+31.819	20	
24	44	(Italy) Roberto Rolfo	Suter	18	+35.447	27	
25	76	(Spain) Bernat Martínez	Bimota	18	+35.851	28	
26	53	(France) Valentin Debise	ADV	18	+42.924	39	
27	39	(Venezuela) Robertino Pietri	Suter	18	+51.566	29	
28	35	(Italy) Raffaele De Rosa	Tech 3	18	+56.529	36	
29	21	(Russia) Vladimir Leonov	Suter	18	+58.361	40	
30	71	(Italy) Claudio Corti	Suter	18	+1:18.671	1	
NC	5	(Spain) Joan Olivé	Promoharris	18	+2:44.369 (Note: Not classified due to finishing the race through pits.)	35	
Ret	68	(Colombia) Yonny Hernández	BQR-Moto2	17	Accident	5	
Ret	25	(Italy) Alex Baldolini	I.C.P.	17	Collision	7	
Ret	17	(Czech Republic) Karel Abraham	FTR	17	Collision	14	
Ret	55	(Spain) Héctor Faubel	Suter	17	Accident	32	
Ret	75	(Italy) Mattia Pasini	Motobi	16	Retirement	21	
Ret	2	(Hungary) Gábor Talmácsi	Speed Up	15	Accident	19	
Ret	96	(France) Anthony Delhalle	BQR-Moto2	13	Accident	37	
Ret	3	(Italy) Simone Corsi	Motobi	1	Collision	15	
Ret	65	(Germany) Stefan Bradl	Suter	1	Collision	3	
DNS	15	(San Marino) Alex de Angelis	Force GP210		Did not start		
OFFICIAL MOTO2 REPORT

== 125 cc classification ==
Pos.	No.	Rider	Manufacturer	Laps	Time/Retired	Grid	Points
1	93	(Spain) Marc Márquez	Derbi	17	38:12.837	1	25
2	44	(Spain) Pol Espargaró	Derbi	17	+2.576	3	20
3	38	(United Kingdom) Bradley Smith	Aprilia	17	+13.446	2	16
4	40	(Spain) Nicolás Terol	Aprilia	17	+17.117	4	13
5	71	(Japan) Tomoyoshi Koyama	Aprilia	17	+35.641	7	11
6	11	(Germany) Sandro Cortese	Derbi	17	+39.184	11	10
7	35	(Switzerland) Randy Krummenacher	Aprilia	17	+39.258	10	9
8	14	(France) Johann Zarco	Aprilia	17	+39.949	5	8
9	12	(Spain) Esteve Rabat	Aprilia	17	+40.510	6	7
10	99	(United Kingdom) Danny Webb	Aprilia	17	+50.287	8	6
11	7	(Spain) Efrén Vázquez	Derbi	17	+1:03.503	9	5
12	23	(Spain) Alberto Moncayo	Aprilia	17	+1:04.065	12	4
13	53	(Netherlands) Jasper Iwema	Aprilia	17	+1:07.148	14	3
14	15	(Italy) Simone Grotzkyj	Aprilia	17	+1:07.591	15	2
15	94	(Germany) Jonas Folger	Aprilia	17	+1:07.601	24	1
16	26	(Spain) Adrián Martín	Aprilia	17	+1:08.045	17	
17	78	(Germany) Marcel Schrötter	Honda	17	+1:12.472	20	
18	50	(Norway) Sturla Fagerhaug	Aprilia	17	+1:16.933	16	
19	69	(France) Louis Rossi	Aprilia	17	+1:38.139	19	
20	84	(Czech Republic) Jakub Kornfeil	Aprilia	17	+1:41.224	21	
21	32	(Italy) Lorenzo Savadori	Aprilia	17	+1:41.416	23	
22	60	(Netherlands) Michael van der Mark	Lambretta	17	+1:42.313	25	
23	87	(Italy) Luca Marconi	Aprilia	17	+1:42.642	28	
24	75	(United Kingdom) Deane Brown	Honda	16	+1 lap	26	
Ret	73	(United Kingdom) Taylor Mackenzie	Honda	16	Retirement	27	
Ret	63	(Malaysia) Zulfahmi Khairuddin	Aprilia	11	Retirement	22	
Ret	52	(United Kingdom) Danny Kent	Honda	11	Retirement	29	
Ret	74	(United Kingdom) James Lodge	Honda	8	Retirement	31	
Ret	5	(France) Alexis Masbou	Aprilia	5	Retirement	18	
Ret	39	(Spain) Luis Salom	Aprilia	4	Accident	13	
Ret	72	(Italy) Marco Ravaioli	Lambretta	4	Retirement	30	
DNQ	77	(Republic of Ireland) Andrew Reid	Honda		Did not qualify		
OFFICIAL 125CC REPORT

== Championship standings after the race (MotoGP) ==
Below are the standings for the top five riders and constructors after round five has concluded.

Riders' Championship standings

Pos.	Rider	Points
1	(Spain) Jorge Lorenzo	115
2	(Italy) Andrea Dovizioso	78
3	(Spain) Dani Pedrosa	73
4	(Italy) Valentino Rossi	61
5	(United States) Nicky Hayden	52

Constructors' Championship standings

Pos.	Constructor	Points
1	(Japan) Yamaha	120
2	(Japan) Honda	97
3	(Italy) Ducati	65
4	(Japan) Suzuki	23

- Note: Only the top five positions are included for both sets of standings.

Previous race: 2010 Italian Grand Prix	FIM Grand Prix World Championship; 2010 season	Next race: 2010 Dutch TT
Previous race: 2009 British Grand Prix	British motorcycle Grand Prix	Next race: 2011 British Grand Prix
