= Deane Brown =

British motorcycle racer

- Nationality: British
- Born: 4 May 1993 (age 33); Motherwell, Scotland

Deane Brown is a former Grand Prix motorcycle racer from Great Britain. He has previously competed in the Red Bull MotoGP Rookies Cup, the British 125cc Championship, the British National Superstock 600 Championship and the British National Superstock 1000 Championship.

== Career statistics ==
2011 - NC, European Superstock 600 Championship, Yamaha YZF-R6

=== Red Bull MotoGP Rookies Cup ===
==== Races by year ====
(key) (Races in bold indicate pole position, races in italics indicate fastest lap)

Year	1	2	3	4	5	6	7	8	9	10	Pos	Pts
2007	SPA; 8	ITA	GBR; 5	NED; 6	GER; Ret	CZE; 9	POR; 5	VAL; 2			7th	67
2008	SPA1; 3	SPA2; 3	POR; 6	FRA	ITA	GBR	NED	GER	CZE1; 4	CZE2; Ret	14th	55
2009	SPA1	SPA2	ITA	NED; 13	GER; Ret	GBR; Ret	CZE1; 18	CZE2; 10			21st	9

=== European Superstock 600 ===
==== Races by year ====
(key) (Races in bold indicate pole position, races in italics indicate fastest lap)

Year	Bike	1	2	3	4	5	6	7	8	9	10	Pos	Pts
2011	Yamaha	ASS	MNZ	MIS	ARA	BRN	SIL	NÜR	IMO	MAG	POR; 16	NC	0

=== Grand Prix motorcycle racing ===
==== By season ====
Season	Class	Motorcycle	Team	Number	Race	Win	Podium	Pole	FLap	Pts	Plcd
2010	125cc	Honda	Colin Appleyard/Macadam Racing	75	1	0	0	0	0	0	NC
Total					**1**	**0**	**0**	**0**	**0**	**0**	

==== Races by year ====
Yr	Class	Bike	1	2	3	4	5	6	7	8	9	10	11	12	13	14	15	16	17	Final Pos	Pts	Ref
2010	125cc	Honda	QAT	SPA	FRA	ITA	GBR; 24	NED	CAT	GER	CZE	INP	RSM	ARA	JPN	MAL	AUS	POR	VAL	NC	0	

=== Other series ===
==== British 125cc Championship ====
Year	Bike	1	2	3	4	5	6	7	8	9	10	11	12	13	Pos	Pts	Ref
2008	Honda	THR; Ret	OUL; Ret	BHGP	DON; C	SNE	MAL1	MAL2	OUL; Ret	KNO; Ret	CAD; 7	CRO; 6	SIL; Ret	BHI; Ret	**21st**	**19**	
2009	Honda	BHI; Ret	OUL	DON	THR; 16	SNE; 12	KNO; 7	MAL	BHGP; 9	CAD; 2	CRO; 5	SIL; 7	OUL; 3		**9th**	**76**	
2010	Honda	BHI; Ret	THR; Ret	OUL; 2	CAD; 2	MAL; 2	KNO; C	SNE; Ret	BHGP; 6	CAD; Ret	CRO; 2	CRO; 2	SIL; 1	OUL; 2	**3rd**	**145**	

==== National Superstock 600 ====
Year	Bike	1	2	3	4	5	6	7	8	9	10	11	12	13	Pos	Pts	Ref
2011	Yamaha	BHI; 3	OUL; Ret	CRO; 3	THR; 7	KNO; 5	SNE; 6	OUL; C	BHGP; Ret	CAD; 8	DON1; 3	DON2; 3	SIL; 7	BHGP; 3	**4th**	**127**	

==== British Supersport Championship ====
Year	Bike	1		2		3		4		5		6		7		8		9		10		11		12		Pos	Pts	Ref
Year	Bike	R1	R2	R1	R2	R1	R2	R1	R2	R1	R2	R1	R2	R1	R2	R1	R2	R1	R2	R1	R2	R1	R2	R1	R2	Pos	Pts	Ref
2012	Yamaha	BHI; 19	BHI; 5	THR	THR	OUL; 17	OUL; Ret	SNE; 13	SNE; Ret	KNO; 13	KNO; 9	OUL; 8	OUL; 12	BHGP; 8	BHGP; DNS	CAD; 10	CAD; Ret	DON; 6	DON; Ret	ASS; 14	ASS; Ret	SIL	SIL	BHGP; Ret	BHGP; 8	13th	64.5	

* Denotes season still in progress
