= Farid Badrul =

Malaysian motorcycle racer

- Nationality: Malaysian
- Born: 10 August 1993 (age 33); Kuala Lumpur, Malaysia

Muhammad Farid Badrul Hisham is a Grand Prix motorcycle racer from Malaysia.

== Career statistics ==
2015- 18th, Asia Road Race SS600 Championship #83 Kawasaki ZX-6R
2014- 20th, Asia Road Race SS600 Championship #83 Kawasaki ZX-6R
2013- 30th, Asia Road Race SS600 Championship #93 Yamaha YZF-R6
2012- 13th, Asia Road Race SS600 Championship #93 Yamaha YZF-R6
2011- 44th, British National Superstock 600 Championship #93 Kawasaki ZX-6R

=== National Superstock 600 Championship ===
Year	Bike	1	2	3	4	5	6	7	8	9	10	11	12	13	Pos	Pts
2011	Kawasaki	BRH; 17	OUL; DNQ	CRO; Ret	THR; 28	KNO; 29	SNE; 22	OUL; C	BRH; 24	CAD; DNQ	DON	DON	SIL	BRH	45th	0

=== Grand Prix motorcycle racing ===
==== By season ====
Season	Class	Motorcycle	Team	Number	Race	Win	Podium	Pole	FLap	Pts	Plcd
2011	125cc	Derbi	AirAsia-Sic-Ajo	64	1	0	0	0	0	0	NC
Total					1	0	0	0	0	0	

==== Races by year ====
(key)

Yr	Class	Bike	1	2	3	4	5	6	7	8	9	10	11	12	13	14	15	16	17	Pos	Pts
2011	125cc	Derbi	QAT	SPA	POR	FRA	CAT	GBR	NED	ITA	GER	CZE	INP	RSM	ARA	JPN	AUS	MAL; 24	VAL	NC	0
