= 2017 San Marino and Rimini Riviera motorcycle Grand Prix =

2017 San Marino and Rimini Riviera Grand Prix
Race details
- Race 13 of 18 races in the 2017 Grand Prix motorcycle racing season
- Date: September 10, 2017
- Official name: Gran Premio Tribul MasterCard di San Marino e della Riviera di Rimini
- Location: Misano World Circuit Marco Simoncelli
- Course: Permanent racing facility; 4.226 km (2.626 mi)

MotoGP
Pole position
| Rider | (Spain) Maverick Viñales | Yamaha |
| Time | 1:32.439 | |
Fastest lap
| Rider | (Spain) Marc Márquez | Honda |
| Time | 1:47.069 on lap 28 | |
Podium
| First | (Spain) Marc Márquez | Honda |
| Second | (Italy) Danilo Petrucci | Ducati |
| Third | (Italy) Andrea Dovizioso | Ducati |

Moto2
Pole position
| Rider | (Italy) Mattia Pasini | Kalex |
| Time | 1:37.390 | |
Fastest lap
| Rider | (South Africa) Brad Binder | KTM |
| Time | 1:57.732 on lap 25 | |
Podium
| First | (Switzerland) Thomas Lüthi | Kalex |
| Second | (Malaysia) Hafizh Syahrin | Kalex |
| Third | (Italy) Francesco Bagnaia | Kalex |

Moto3
Pole position
| Rider | (Italy) Enea Bastianini (Note: Enea Bastianini, who set the fastest time in qualifying, received a grid penalty which promoted Jorge Martín to the pole position grid slot.) | Honda |
| Time | 1:42.147 | |
Fastest lap
| Rider | (Italy) Romano Fenati | Honda |
| Time | 1:59.425 on lap 4 | |
Podium
| First | (Italy) Romano Fenati | Honda |
| Second | (Spain) Joan Mir | Honda |
| Third | (Italy) Fabio Di Giannantonio | Honda |

The 2017 San Marino and Rimini Riviera motorcycle Grand Prix was the thirteenth round of the 2017 MotoGP season. It was held at the Misano World Circuit Marco Simoncelli in Misano Adriatico on September 10, 2017.

This race also set a new crash record, with 140 crashes across all three classes throughout the weekend, beating the number of crashes in the Estoril 2010 race, which had 130.

== Classification ==
=== MotoGP ===
| Pos. | No. | Rider | Team | Manufacturer | Laps | Time/Retired | Grid | Points |
|---|---|---|---|---|---|---|---|---|
| 1 | 93 | (Spain) Marc Márquez | Repsol Honda Team | Honda | 28 | 50:41.565 | 3 | 25 |
| 2 | 9 | (Italy) Danilo Petrucci | Octo Pramac Racing | Ducati | 28 | +1.192 | 8 | 20 |
| 3 | 4 | (Italy) Andrea Dovizioso | Ducati Team | Ducati | 28 | +11.706 | 2 | 16 |
| 4 | 25 | (Spain) Maverick Viñales | Movistar Yamaha MotoGP | Yamaha | 28 | +16.559 | 1 | 13 |
| 5 | 51 | (Italy) Michele Pirro | Ducati Team | Ducati | 28 | +19.499 | 11 | 11 |
| 6 | 43 | (Australia) Jack Miller | EG 0,0 Marc VDS | Honda | 28 | +24.882 | 14 | 10 |
| 7 | 45 | (United Kingdom) Scott Redding | Octo Pramac Racing | Ducati | 28 | +33.872 | 19 | 9 |
| 8 | 42 | (Spain) Álex Rins | Team Suzuki Ecstar | Suzuki | 28 | +34.662 | 20 | 8 |
| 9 | 94 | (Germany) Jonas Folger | Monster Yamaha Tech 3 | Yamaha | 28 | +54.082 | 16 | 7 |
| 10 | 38 | (United Kingdom) Bradley Smith | Red Bull KTM Factory Racing | KTM | 28 | +57.964 | 22 | 6 |
| 11 | 44 | (Spain) Pol Espargaró | Red Bull KTM Factory Racing | KTM | 28 | +1:00.440 | 17 | 5 |
| 12 | 19 | (Spain) Álvaro Bautista | Pull&Bear Aspar Team | Ducati | 28 | +1:17.356 | 10 | 4 |
| 13 | 35 | (United Kingdom) Cal Crutchlow | LCR Honda | Honda | 28 | +1:35.588 | 4 | 3 |
| 14 | 26 | (Spain) Dani Pedrosa | Repsol Honda Team | Honda | 28 | +1:38.857 | 7 | 2 |
| 15 | 5 | (France) Johann Zarco | Monster Yamaha Tech 3 | Yamaha | 28 | +2:02.212 | 6 | 1 |
| 16 | 76 | (France) Loris Baz | Reale Avintia Racing | Ducati | 27 | +1 lap | 15 | |
| 17 | 17 | (Czech Republic) Karel Abraham | Pull&Bear Aspar Team | Ducati | 27 | +1 lap | 12 | |
| Ret | 53 | (Spain) Tito Rabat | EG 0,0 Marc VDS | Honda | 19 | Accident | 18 | |
| Ret | 29 | (Italy) Andrea Iannone | Team Suzuki Ecstar | Suzuki | 16 | Retired | 21 | |
| Ret | 22 | (United Kingdom) Sam Lowes | Aprilia Racing Team Gresini | Aprilia | 15 | Accident | 23 | |
| Ret | 41 | (Spain) Aleix Espargaró | Aprilia Racing Team Gresini | Aprilia | 13 | Accident | 9 | |
| Ret | 8 | (Spain) Héctor Barberá | Reale Avintia Racing | Ducati | 11 | Accident | 13 | |
| Ret | 99 | (Spain) Jorge Lorenzo | Ducati Team | Ducati | 6 | Accident | 5 | |

== Moto2 race report ==
In the Moto2 class, Dominique Aegerter clinched his second win of his career and become the first Suter rider to win a race since Thomas Lüthi in the 2014 Valencia Grand Prix. However Aegerter was later disqualified due to oil infringement giving Thomas Lüthi his 2nd win of the season and closing the gap to Franco Morbidelli with five points.

=== Moto2 ===
| Pos. | No. | Rider | Manufacturer | Laps | Time/Retired | Grid | Points |
|---|---|---|---|---|---|---|---|
| 1 | 12 | (Switzerland) Thomas Lüthi | Kalex | 26 | 51:41.109 | 7 | 25 |
| 2 | 55 | (Malaysia) Hafizh Syahrin | Kalex | 26 | +6.475 | 14 | 20 |
| 3 | 42 | (Italy) Francesco Bagnaia | Kalex | 26 | +19.823 | 6 | 16 |
| 4 | 41 | (South Africa) Brad Binder | KTM | 26 | +22.449 | 17 | 13 |
| 5 | 11 | (Germany) Sandro Cortese | Suter | 26 | +40.021 | 13 | 11 |
| 6 | 40 | (France) Fabio Quartararo | Kalex | 26 | +41.707 (Note: 2.5 second penalty.) | 10 | 10 |
| 7 | 24 | (Italy) Simone Corsi | Speed Up | 26 | +55.526 | 8 | 9 |
| 8 | 89 | (Malaysia) Khairul Idham Pawi | Kalex | 26 | +1:00.095 | 28 | 8 |
| 9 | 2 | (Switzerland) Jesko Raffin | Kalex | 26 | +1:18.792 (Note: 4.1-second penalty.) | 26 | 7 |
| 10 | 30 | (Japan) Takaaki Nakagami | Kalex | 26 | +1:31.048 | 5 | 6 |
| 11 | 15 | (San Marino) Alex de Angelis | Suter | 25 | +1 lap | 25 | 5 |
| 12 | 87 | (Australia) Remy Gardner | Tech 3 | 25 | +1 lap | 21 | 4 |
| 13 | 45 | (Japan) Tetsuta Nagashima | Kalex | 25 | +1 lap | 27 | 3 |
| 14 | 97 | (Spain) Xavi Vierge | Tech 3 | 25 | +1 lap | 15 | 2 |
| 15 | 22 | (Italy) Federico Fuligni | Kalex | 25 | +1 lap | 31 | 1 |
| Ret | 62 | (Italy) Stefano Manzi | Kalex | 22 | Accident | 16 | |
| Ret | 20 | (United States) Joe Roberts | Kalex | 12 | Accident | 29 | |
| Ret | 5 | (Italy) Andrea Locatelli | Kalex | 11 | Accident | 20 | |
| Ret | 27 | (Spain) Iker Lecuona | Kalex | 11 | Accident | 19 | |
| Ret | 44 | (Portugal) Miguel Oliveira | KTM | 10 | Retired | 9 | |
| Ret | 19 | (Belgium) Xavier Siméon | Kalex | 9 | Accident | 23 | |
| Ret | 37 | (Spain) Augusto Fernández | Speed Up | 9 | Accident | 24 | |
| Ret | 32 | (Spain) Isaac Viñales | Kalex | 7 | Accident | 22 | |
| Ret | 9 | (Spain) Jorge Navarro | Kalex | 5 | Accident | 12 | |
| Ret | 57 | (Spain) Edgar Pons | Kalex | 5 | Retired | 18 | |
| Ret | 21 | (Italy) Franco Morbidelli | Kalex | 3 | Accident | 2 | |
| Ret | 54 | (Italy) Mattia Pasini | Kalex | 2 | Accident | 1 | |
| Ret | 7 | (Italy) Lorenzo Baldassarri | Kalex | 2 | Accident | 4 | |
| Ret | 6 | (United Kingdom) Tarran Mackenzie | Suter | 1 | Retired | 30 | |
| Ret | 10 | (Italy) Luca Marini | Kalex | 0 | Accident | 11 | |
| DSQ | 77 | (Switzerland) Dominique Aegerter | Suter | 26 | (51:39.709) (Note: Disqualified due to a technical infringement.) | 3 | |
| DNS | 49 | (Spain) Axel Pons | Kalex | | Did not start | | |
| DNS | 73 | (Spain) Álex Márquez | Kalex | | Did not start | | |
OFFICIAL MOTO2 REPORT

=== Moto3 ===
| Pos. | No. | Rider | Manufacturer | Laps | Time/Retired | Grid | Points |
|---|---|---|---|---|---|---|---|
| 1 | 5 | (Italy) Romano Fenati | Honda | 23 | 46:24.290 | 5 | 25 |
| 2 | 36 | (Spain) Joan Mir | Honda | 23 | +28.594 | 2 | 20 |
| 3 | 21 | (Italy) Fabio Di Giannantonio | Honda | 23 | +39.035 | 3 | 16 |
| 4 | 65 | (Germany) Philipp Öttl | KTM | 23 | +55.591 | 11 | 13 |
| 5 | 8 | (Italy) Nicolò Bulega | KTM | 23 | +1:02.433 | 8 | 11 |
| 6 | 64 | (Netherlands) Bo Bendsneyder | KTM | 23 | +1:09.312 | 7 | 10 |
| 7 | 84 | (Czech Republic) Jakub Kornfeil | Peugeot | 23 | +1:09.984 | 15 | 9 |
| 8 | 75 | (Spain) Albert Arenas | Mahindra | 23 | +1:13.420 | 26 (Note: 3-place grid penalty.) | 8 |
| 9 | 16 | (Italy) Andrea Migno | KTM | 23 | +1:22.747 | 24 (Note: 12-place grid penalty.) | 7 |
| 10 | 15 | (Spain) Jaume Masiá | KTM | 23 | +1:32.446 | 16 | 6 |
| 11 | 96 | (Italy) Manuel Pagliani | Mahindra | 23 | +1:39.088 | 21 | 5 |
| 12 | 42 | (Spain) Marcos Ramírez | KTM | 23 | +1:39.925 | 13 | 4 |
| 13 | 57 | (San Marino) Alex Fabbri | Mahindra | 22 | +1 lap | 30 | 3 |
| 14 | 33 | (Italy) Enea Bastianini | Honda | 22 | +1 lap | 4 | 2 |
| 15 | 48 | (Italy) Lorenzo Dalla Porta | Mahindra | 22 | +1 lap | 12 | 1 |
| Ret | 4 | (Finland) Patrik Pulkkinen | Peugeot | 22 | Accident | 27 | |
| Ret | 44 | (Spain) Arón Canet | Honda | 20 | Accident | 9 | |
| Ret | 51 | (Italy) Kevin Zannoni | KTM | 19 | Accident | 28 | |
| Ret | 27 | (Japan) Kaito Toba | Honda | 18 | Accident | 25 | |
| Ret | 23 | (Italy) Niccolò Antonelli | KTM | 17 | Accident | 20 | |
| Ret | 14 | (Italy) Tony Arbolino | Honda | 15 | Accident | 17 | |
| Ret | 71 | (Japan) Ayumu Sasaki | Honda | 13 | Accident | 19 | |
| Ret | 12 | (Italy) Marco Bezzecchi | Mahindra | 13 | Accident | 10 | |
| Ret | 88 | (Spain) Jorge Martín | Honda | 9 | Accident | 1 | |
| Ret | 58 | (Spain) Juan Francisco Guevara | KTM | 8 | Retired | 18 | |
| Ret | 17 | (United Kingdom) John McPhee | Honda | 7 | Accident | 14 | |
| Ret | 95 | (France) Jules Danilo | Honda | 7 | Accident | 29 | |
| Ret | 7 | (Malaysia) Adam Norrodin | Honda | 5 | Accident | 22 | |
| Ret | 24 | (Japan) Tatsuki Suzuki | Honda | 3 | Accident | 31 | |
| Ret | 41 | (Thailand) Nakarin Atiratphuvapat | Honda | 3 | Accident | 23 | |
| Ret | 19 | (Argentina) Gabriel Rodrigo | KTM | 2 | Accident | 6 | |
| DNS | 6 | (Spain) María Herrera | KTM | | Did not start | | |
| DNS | 11 | (Belgium) Livio Loi | Honda | | Did not start | | |
OFFICIAL MOTO3 REPORT

- María Herrera suffered a broken collarbone in a crash during Sunday warm-up session and was declared unfit to start the race.
- Livio Loi suffered a broken collarbone in a collision with Gabriel Rodrigo during qualifying and withdrew from the event.

== Championship standings after the race ==
=== MotoGP ===
Below are the standings for the top five riders and constructors after round thirteen has concluded.

Riders' Championship standings

| Pos. | Rider | Points |
|---|---|---|
| 1 | (Spain) Marc Márquez | 199 |
| 2 | (Italy) Andrea Dovizioso | 199 |
| 3 | (Spain) Maverick Viñales | 183 |
| 4 | (Italy) Valentino Rossi | 157 |
| 5 | (Spain) Dani Pedrosa | 150 |

Constructors' Championship standings

| Pos. | Constructor | Points |
|---|---|---|
| 1 | (Japan) Honda | 249 |
| 2 | (Japan) Yamaha | 244 |
| 3 | (Italy) Ducati | 232 |
| 4 | (Japan) Suzuki | 60 |
| 5 | (Italy) Aprilia | 45 |

- Note: Only the top five positions are included for both sets of standings.

=== Moto2 ===
| Pos. | Rider | Points |
|---|---|---|
| 1 | (Italy) Franco Morbidelli | 223 |
| 2 | (Switzerland) Thomas Lüthi | 219 |
| 3 | (Spain) Álex Márquez | 155 |
| 4 | (Portugal) Miguel Oliveira | 141 |
| 5 | (Italy) Francesco Bagnaia | 127 |
| 6 | (Japan) Takaaki Nakagami | 110 |
| 7 | (Italy) Mattia Pasini | 104 |
| 8 | (Italy) Simone Corsi | 87 |
| 9 | (Malaysia) Hafizh Syahrin | 70 |
| 10 | (Switzerland) Dominique Aegerter | 63 |

=== Moto3 ===
| Pos. | Rider | Points |
|---|---|---|
| 1 | (Spain) Joan Mir | 246 |
| 2 | (Italy) Romano Fenati | 185 |
| 3 | (Spain) Arón Canet | 162 |
| 4 | (Spain) Jorge Martín | 121 |
| 5 | (Italy) Fabio Di Giannantonio | 117 |
| 6 | (Italy) Andrea Migno | 98 |
| 7 | (United Kingdom) John McPhee | 96 |
| 8 | (Spain) Marcos Ramírez | 96 |
| 9 | (Italy) Enea Bastianini | 87 |
| 10 | (Germany) Philipp Öttl | 84 |

== Notes ==
| Previous race: 2017 British Grand Prix | FIM Grand Prix World Championship; 2017 season | Next race: 2017 Aragon Grand Prix |
| Previous race: 2016 San Marino Grand Prix | San Marino and Rimini Riviera motorcycle Grand Prix | Next race: 2018 San Marino Grand Prix |
