= Dakota Mamola =

Belgian motorcycle racer

- Nationality: Belgian
- Born: 21 October 1994 (age 32); Barcelona, Spain
- Current team: Meen Motorsports / HB Racing
- Bike number: 80
Motorcycle racing career statistics
Moto2 World Championship
| Active years | 2014 |
| Manufacturers | Suter |
| 2014 championship position | NC (0 pts) |
Starts / Wins / Podiums / Poles / F. laps / Points; 1 / 0 / 0 / 0 / 0 / 0

Dakota Mamola (born 21 October 1994 in Barcelona) is a Belgian motorcycle racer. He races in the MotoAmerica Superstock 600 Championship aboard a Yamaha YZF-R6. Son of an American father—the former motorcycle racer Randy Mamola—and a Belgian mother, he has competed either with a Spanish and a Belgian racing license. In 2014, he made his debut in the Moto2 World Championship under the Belgian flag, as he replaced Nicolás Terol for the British Grand Prix.

== Career statistics ==
2013 - 19th, European Superstock 600 Championship #80 Yamaha YZF-R6

=== British 125 Championship ===
| Year | Bike | 1 | 2 | 3 | 4 | 5 | 6 | 7 | 8 | 9 | 10 | 11 | 12 | 13 | Pos | Pts |
|---|---|---|---|---|---|---|---|---|---|---|---|---|---|---|---|---|
| 2010 | Honda | BRH; Ret | THR | OUL; 7 | CAD | MAL | KNO; C | SNE; 2 | BRH; 5 | CAD | CRO | CRO; WD | SIL | OUL | **15th** | **40** |

=== European Superstock 600 ===
==== Races by year ====
(key) (Races in bold indicate pole position, races in italics indicate fastest lap)

| Year | Bike | 1 | 2 | 3 | 4 | 5 | 6 | 7 | 8 | 9 | 10 | Pos | Pts |
|---|---|---|---|---|---|---|---|---|---|---|---|---|---|
| 2013 | Yamaha | ARA; 17 | ASS; 21 | MNZ; 17 | POR; 20 | IMO; 11 | SIL1; 16 | SIL2; 9 | NÜR; 14 | MAG; 10 | JER; 8 | 19th | 28 |

=== Grand Prix motorcycle racing ===
==== By season ====
| Season | Class | Motorcycle | Team | Number | Race | Win | Podium | Pole | FLap | Pts | Plcd |
|---|---|---|---|---|---|---|---|---|---|---|---|
| 2014 | Moto2 | Suter | Mapfre Aspar Team Moto2 | 80 | 1 | 0 | 0 | 0 | 0 | 0 | NC |
| Total | | | | | **1** | **0** | **0** | **0** | **0** | **0** | |

==== Races by year ====
| Year | Class | Bike | 1 | 2 | 3 | 4 | 5 | 6 | 7 | 8 | 9 | 10 | 11 | 12 | 13 | 14 | 15 | 16 | 17 | 18 | Pos. | Pts |
|---|---|---|---|---|---|---|---|---|---|---|---|---|---|---|---|---|---|---|---|---|---|---|
| 2014 | Moto2 | Suter | QAT | AME | ARG | SPA | FRA | ITA | CAT | NED | GER | INP | CZE | GBR; 30 | RSM | ARA | JPN | AUS | MAL | VAL | NC | 0 |
