= 2013 Moto3 World Championship =

2nd running of the Moto3 World Championship

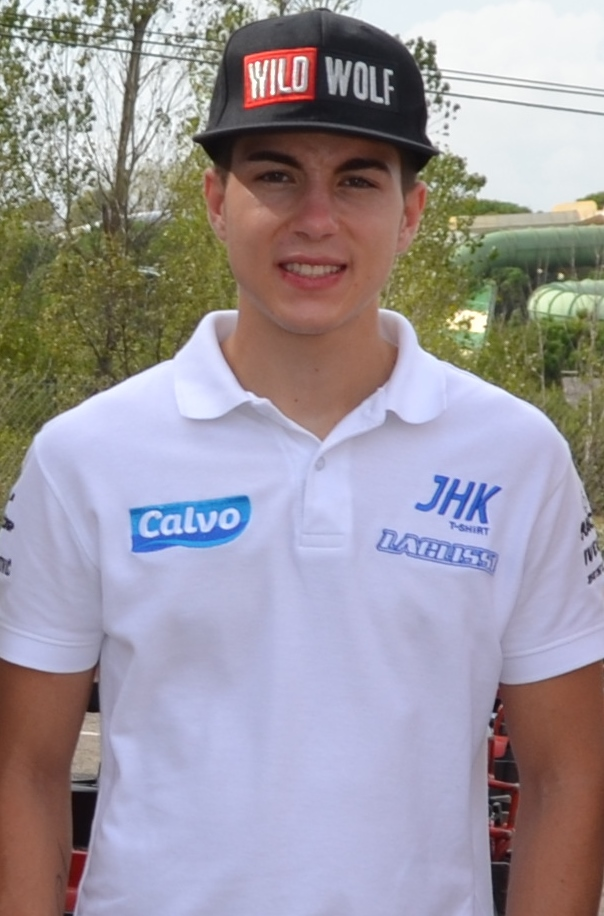
Maverick Viñales was the 2013 Moto3 World Riders' Champion.

The 2013 FIM Moto3 World Championship was the lightweight class of the 65th Fédération Internationale de Motocyclisme (FIM) Road Racing World Championship season. The riders' championship title was won by Team Calvo rider Maverick Viñales and runner up by Álex Rins from Estrella Galicia 0,0.

== Season summary ==
In Moto3, the championship was dominated by three Spanish riders, all riding KTM machinery. Like the premier class, there was a final race title decider between Ajo Motorsport's Luis Salom, Estrella Galicia 0,0's Álex Rins and Maverick Viñales of Team Calvo; if any rider of the three won the race, they finished as the champion, regardless of the other results. After Salom crashed out early in the race, Rins and Viñales battled at the front, with Viñales ultimately coming out as the victor and champion, with Rins being passed for second place on the line by Jonas Folger. With Salom only making it back up to fourteenth, Rins finished as runner-up ahead of Salom. With every race won by a KTM rider – seven wins for Salom, six for Rins, three for Viñales and one for Álex Márquez, the teammate of Rins, at Motegi – the marque was comfortably the winners of the constructors' championship, scoring more than double the points of the next placed constructor, Kalex KTM.

== Calendar ==
The following Grands Prix were scheduled to take place in 2013:

The Fédération Internationale de Motocyclisme released a 18-race provisional calendar on 19 September 2012. On 23 November 2012, the calendar was updated following confirmation that the return of the Argentine Grand Prix would be postponed to 2014. The Grand Prix of the Americas held at the Circuit of the Americas in Austin, United States, replaced the Portuguese Grand Prix, which had been run at Estoril since 2000. The United States hosted two races, the other being the Indianapolis Grand Prix at the Indianapolis Motor Speedway.

Round	Date	Grand Prix	Circuit
1	7 April ‡	Commercialbank Grand Prix of Qatar	Lusail International Circuit, Lusail
2	21 April	(United States) Red Bull Grand Prix of the Americas	Circuit of the Americas, Austin
3	5 May	(Spain) Gran Premio bwin de España	Circuito de Jerez, Jerez de la Frontera
4	19 May	Monster Energy Grand Prix de France	Bugatti Circuit, Le Mans
5	2 June	(Italy) Gran Premio d'Italia TIM	Mugello Circuit, Scarperia e San Piero
6	16 June	(Catalonia) Gran Premi Aperol de Catalunya	Circuit de Barcelona-Catalunya, Montmeló
7	29 June ††	(Netherlands) Iveco TT Assen	TT Circuit Assen, Assen
8	14 July	(Germany) eni Motorrad Grand Prix Deutschland	Sachsenring, Hohenstein-Ernstthal
9	18 August	Red Bull Indianapolis Grand Prix	Indianapolis Motor Speedway, Speedway
10	25 August	(Czech Republic) bwin Grand Prix České republiky	Brno Circuit, Brno
11	1 September	(United Kingdom) Hertz British Grand Prix	Silverstone Circuit, Silverstone
12	15 September	Gran Premio Aperol di San Marino e Della Riviera di Rimini	Misano World Circuit, Misano Adriatico
13	29 September	(Aragon) Gran Premio Iveco de Aragón	MotorLand Aragón, Alcañiz
14	13 October	(Malaysia) Shell Advance Malaysian Motorcycle Grand Prix	Sepang International Circuit, Sepang
15	20 October	(Australia) Tissot Australian Grand Prix	Phillip Island Grand Prix Circuit, Phillip Island
16	27 October	AirAsia Grand Prix of Japan	Motegi Circuit, Motegi
17	10 November	(Valencian Community) Gran Premio Generali de la Comunitat Valenciana	Circuit Ricardo Tormo, Valencia

‡ = Night race
†† = Saturday race

=== Calendar changes ===
- The Grand Prix of the Americas was added to the calendar.
- The Portuguese Grand Prix was taken off the calendar. The race was scheduled on the calendar since 2000.
- The British Grand Prix was moved back, from 17 June to 1 September.
- The Japanese Grand Prix was moved back, from 14 to 27 October.

== Teams and riders ==
- A provisional entry list was released by the Fédération Internationale de Motocyclisme on 28 November 2012. An updated entry list was released on 12 February 2013. All teams used Dunlop tyres.

Team	Constructor	Motorcycle	No.	Rider	Rounds
(Italy) Ongetta–Centro Seta (Italy) Ongetta–Rivacold (Italy) Bimbo–Ongetta–Centro Seta	FTR Honda	FTR M313	3	(Italy) Matteo Ferrari	All
(Italy) Ongetta–Centro Seta (Italy) Ongetta–Rivacold (Italy) Bimbo–Ongetta–Centro Seta	FTR Honda	FTR M313	10	(France) Alexis Masbou	All
(Italy) Ongetta–Centro Seta (Italy) Ongetta–Rivacold (Italy) Bimbo–Ongetta–Centro Seta	FTR Honda	FTR M313	32	(Spain) Isaac Viñales	All
(Italy) San Carlo Team Italia	FTR Honda	FTR M313	4	(Italy) Francesco Bagnaia	All
(Italy) San Carlo Team Italia	FTR Honda	FTR M313	5	(Italy) Romano Fenati	All
(Spain) Estrella Galicia 0,0 (Spain) Junior Team Estrella Galicia 0,0	KTM	KTM RC250GP	6	(Spain) María Herrera	13
(Spain) Estrella Galicia 0,0 (Spain) Junior Team Estrella Galicia 0,0	KTM	KTM RC250GP	12	(Spain) Álex Márquez	All
(Spain) Estrella Galicia 0,0 (Spain) Junior Team Estrella Galicia 0,0	KTM	KTM RC250GP	42	(Spain) Álex Rins	All
(India) Mahindra Racing	Mahindra	Mahindra MGP3O	7	(Spain) Efrén Vázquez	All
(India) Mahindra Racing	Mahindra	Mahindra MGP3O	44	(Portugal) Miguel Oliveira	All
(India) Mahindra Racing	Mahindra	Mahindra MGP3O	55	(Italy) Andrea Locatelli	5, 12
(Germany) Caretta Technology – RTG	FTR Honda	FTR M313	8	(Australia) Jack Miller	All
(Germany) Caretta Technology – RTG	FTR Honda	FTR M313	17	(United Kingdom) John McPhee	All
(Germany) Kiefer Racing	Kalex KTM	Kalex KTM	9	(Germany) Toni Finsterbusch	All
(Germany) Kiefer Racing	Kalex KTM	Kalex KTM	43	(Germany) Luca Grünwald	15–16
(Germany) Kiefer Racing	Kalex KTM	Kalex KTM	66	(Germany) Florian Alt	1–4, 6–14, 17
(Belgium) Marc VDS Racing Team	Kalex KTM	Kalex KTM	11	(Belgium) Livio Loi ^{1}	3–17
(Belgium) Marc VDS Racing Team	Kalex KTM	Kalex KTM	95	(France) Jules Danilo	4, 10
(Italy) GMT Racing	FTR	FTR M313	16	(Italy) Andrea Migno	6, 10
(France) ARC	Suter	Suter MMX3	18	(France) Christophe Arciero	4
(Italy) La Fonte TascaRacing	Honda	Honda NSF250R	19	(Italy) Alessandro Tonucci	1–3
(Italy) La Fonte TascaRacing	Honda	Honda NSF250R	29	(Japan) Hyuga Watanabe	1–3
(Italy) La Fonte TascaRacing	FTR Honda	FTR M313	19	(Italy) Alessandro Tonucci	4–14
(Italy) La Fonte TascaRacing	FTR Honda	FTR M313	29	(Japan) Hyuga Watanabe	4–17
(Italy) La Fonte TascaRacing	FTR Honda	FTR M313	80	(Malaysia) Hafiq Azmi	15–17
(India) Mahindra Spiel-Kiste	Mahindra	Mahindra MGP3O	21	(Germany) Luca Amato	8
(Italy) Ambrogio Racing	Suter Honda	Suter MMX3	21	(Germany) Luca Amato	10–11
(Italy) Ambrogio Racing	Suter Honda	Suter MMX3	41	(South Africa) Brad Binder	1–11
(Italy) Ambrogio Racing	Suter Honda	Suter MMX3	95	(France) Jules Danilo	8–9
(Italy) Ambrogio Racing	Suter Honda	Suter MMX3	99	(United Kingdom) Danny Webb	1–7
(Italy) Ambrogio Racing	Mahindra	Mahindra MGP3O	21	(Germany) Luca Amato	12–17
(Italy) Ambrogio Racing	Mahindra	Mahindra MGP3O	41	(South Africa) Brad Binder	12–17
(Spain) Team Calvo	KTM	KTM RC250GP	22	(Spain) Ana Carrasco	All
(Spain) Team Calvo	KTM	KTM RC250GP	25	(Spain) Maverick Viñales	All
(Italy) GO&FUN Gresini Moto3	FTR Honda	FTR M313	23	(Italy) Niccolò Antonelli	All
(Italy) GO&FUN Gresini Moto3	FTR Honda	FTR M313	77	(Italy) Lorenzo Baldassarri	All
(Finland) Avant Tecno	KTM	KTM RC250GP	31	(Finland) Niklas Ajo	All
(Japan) Team Plus One & Endurance	Honda	Honda NSF250R	33	(Japan) Sena Yamada	16
(United Kingdom) Racing Steps Foundation KRP	KRP Honda	KRP M3-02	37	(United Kingdom) Kyle Ryde	11
(United Kingdom) Racing Steps Foundation KRP	KRP Honda	KRP M3-02	98	(United Kingdom) Wayne Ryan	11
(Finland) Red Bull KTM Ajo	KTM	KTM RC250GP	39	(Spain) Luis Salom	All
(Finland) Red Bull KTM Ajo	KTM	KTM RC250GP	61	(Australia) Arthur Sissis	All
(Finland) Red Bull KTM Ajo	KTM	KTM RC250GP	63	(Malaysia) Zulfahmi Khairuddin	All
(Finland) Touchline–SIC–AJO	KTM	KTM RC250GP	79	(Malaysia) Aizat Malik	14
(Finland) Touchline–SIC–AJO	KTM	KTM RC250GP	80	(Malaysia) Hafiq Azmi	14
(Australia) Barker-McVey Racing	Honda	Honda NSF250R	47	(Australia) Callum Barker	15
(Spain) MIR Racing (Spain) Cuna de Campeones	MIR Racing	MIR Racing	49	(Spain) Jorge Navarro	3
(Spain) MIR Racing (Spain) Cuna de Campeones	MIR Honda	MIR Racing	49	(Spain) Jorge Navarro	17
(Netherlands) Dutch Racing Team	FTR Honda	FTR M313	51	(Netherlands) Bryan Schouten	7, 13
(Netherlands) RW Racing GP (Netherlands) Redox RW Racing GP	Kalex KTM	Kalex KTM	53	(Netherlands) Jasper Iwema	All
(Netherlands) RW Racing GP (Netherlands) Redox RW Racing GP	Kalex KTM	Kalex KTM	84	(Czech Republic) Jakub Kornfeil	All
(Spain) Mapfre Aspar Team Moto3	Kalex KTM	Kalex KTM	57	(Brazil) Eric Granado	All
(Spain) Mapfre Aspar Team Moto3	Kalex KTM	Kalex KTM	94	(Germany) Jonas Folger	All
(France) CIP Moto3	TSR Honda	TSR3C	58	(Spain) Juan Francisco Guevara	All
(France) CIP Moto3	TSR Honda	TSR3C	89	(France) Alan Techer	All
(Germany) Paddock TT Motion Events (Switzerland) Tec Interwetten Moto3 Racing (Switzerland) Interwetten Paddock Moto3	Kalex KTM	Kalex KTM	65	(Germany) Philipp Öttl	All
(Netherlands) Racing Team Van Leeuwen	Bakker Honda	EvL250	71	(Netherlands) Thomas van Leeuwen	7
(Australia) Bullet Racing	Bullet	Honda NSF250R	75	(Australia) Lachlan Kavney	15
(Germany) Thomas Sabo GP Team	Honda	Honda NSF250R	86	(Germany) Kevin Hanus	3, 6, 8
(Japan) Team Honda Asia	Honda	Honda NSF250R	91	(Japan) Hiroki Ono	16
(Italy) Minimoto Portomaggiore	Honda	Honda NSF250R	93	(Italy) Michael Coletti	5
(Italy) Twelve Racing	FTR Honda	FTR M313	97	(Italy) Luca Marini	12

Key
Regular Rider
Wildcard Rider
Replacement Rider

Notes:

- ^1 — Livio Loi competed from the Spanish Grand Prix onwards, after reaching the age of 16 on 27 April which is the minimum age to compete in the championship.

=== Rider changes ===
- Having originally signed a deal for 2013, Maverick Viñales decided to quit the Avintia Blusens team before the end of the 2012 season.
- Danny Webb moved from Mahindra Racing to World Wide Communication, which was known as Ambrogio Next Racing in 2012.
- Miguel Oliveira moved from Estrella Galicia 0,0 to Mahindra Racing.

== Results and standings ==
=== Grands Prix ===
Round	Grand Prix	Pole position	Fastest lap	Winning rider	Winning team	Winning constructor	Report
1	Qatar motorcycle Grand Prix	(Spain) Luis Salom	(Germany) Jonas Folger	(Spain) Luis Salom	(Finland) Red Bull KTM Ajo	(Austria) KTM	Report
2	(United States) Motorcycle Grand Prix of the Americas	(Spain) Álex Rins	(Spain) Luis Salom	(Spain) Álex Rins	(Spain) Estrella Galicia 0,0	(Austria) KTM	Report
3	(Spain) Spanish motorcycle Grand Prix	(Spain) Álex Rins	(Spain) Luis Salom	(Spain) Maverick Viñales	(Spain) Team Calvo	(Austria) KTM	Report
4	(France) French motorcycle Grand Prix	(Spain) Maverick Viñales	(Spain) Maverick Viñales	(Spain) Maverick Viñales	(Spain) Team Calvo	(Austria) KTM	Report
5	(Italy) Italian motorcycle Grand Prix	(Germany) Jonas Folger	(Portugal) Miguel Oliveira	(Spain) Luis Salom	(Finland) Red Bull KTM Ajo	(Austria) KTM	Report
6	(Catalonia) Catalan motorcycle Grand Prix	(Spain) Luis Salom	(Spain) Maverick Viñales	(Spain) Luis Salom	(Finland) Red Bull KTM Ajo	(Austria) KTM	Report
7	(Netherlands) Dutch TT	(Portugal) Miguel Oliveira	(Portugal) Miguel Oliveira	(Spain) Luis Salom	(Finland) Red Bull KTM Ajo	(Austria) KTM	Report
8	(Germany) German motorcycle Grand Prix	(Spain) Álex Rins	(Spain) Luis Salom	(Spain) Álex Rins	(Spain) Estrella Galicia 0,0	(Austria) KTM	Report
9	Indianapolis motorcycle Grand Prix	(Spain) Álex Rins	(Spain) Maverick Viñales	(Spain) Álex Rins	(Spain) Estrella Galicia 0,0	(Austria) KTM	Report
10	Czech Republic motorcycle Grand Prix	(Spain) Álex Rins	(Spain) Luis Salom	(Spain) Luis Salom	(Finland) Red Bull KTM Ajo	(Austria) KTM	Report
11	(United Kingdom) British motorcycle Grand Prix	(Spain) Maverick Viñales	(Spain) Álex Rins	(Spain) Luis Salom	(Finland) Red Bull KTM Ajo	(Austria) KTM	Report
12	San Marino and Rimini Riviera motorcycle Grand Prix	(Germany) Jonas Folger	(Spain) Álex Márquez	(Spain) Álex Rins	(Spain) Estrella Galicia 0,0	(Austria) KTM	Report
13	Aragon motorcycle Grand Prix	(Spain) Álex Rins	(Germany) Philipp Öttl	(Spain) Álex Rins	(Spain) Estrella Galicia 0,0	(Austria) KTM	Report
14	(Malaysia) Malaysian motorcycle Grand Prix	(Spain) Luis Salom	(Portugal) Miguel Oliveira	(Spain) Luis Salom	(Finland) Red Bull KTM Ajo	(Austria) KTM	Report
15	(Australia) Australian motorcycle Grand Prix	(Spain) Luis Salom	(Spain) Álex Márquez	(Spain) Álex Rins	(Spain) Estrella Galicia 0,0	(Austria) KTM	Report
16	(Japan) Japanese motorcycle Grand Prix	(Spain) Álex Rins	(Spain) Álex Márquez	(Spain) Álex Márquez	(Spain) Estrella Galicia 0,0	(Austria) KTM	Report
17	Valencian Community motorcycle Grand Prix	(Spain) Álex Rins	(Spain) Luis Salom	(Spain) Maverick Viñales	(Spain) Team Calvo	(Austria) KTM	Report

=== Riders' standings ===
Scoring system

Points were awarded to the top fifteen finishers. A rider had to finish the race to earn points.

Position	**1st**	**2nd**	**3rd**	**4th**	**5th**	**6th**	**7th**	**8th**	**9th**	**10th**	**11th**	**12th**	**13th**	**14th**	**15th**
Points	25	20	16	13	11	10	9	8	7	6	5	4	3	2	1

Pos	Rider	Bike	QAT (Qatar)	AME (United States)	SPA (Spain)	FRA (France)	ITA (Italy)	CAT (Catalonia)	NED (Netherlands)	GER (Germany)	INP (Indianapolis)	CZE (Czech Republic)	GBR (United Kingdom)	RSM (San Marino)	ARA (Aragon)	MAL (Malaysia)	AUS (Australia)	JPN (Japan)	VAL (Valencian Community)	Pts
1	(Spain) Maverick Viñales	KTM	2	2	1	**1**	3	3	2	3	3	2	**4**	2	2	5	2	2	1	323
2	(Spain) Álex Rins	KTM	3	**1**	**Ret**	2	2	2	3	**1**	**1**	**4**	2	1	**1**	2	1	**24**	**3**	311
3	(Spain) Luis Salom	KTM	**1**	3	2	3	1	**1**	1	2	5	1	1	4	4	**1**	**3**	Ret	14	302
4	(Spain) Álex Márquez	KTM	4	Ret	23	5	5	4	5	5	2	5	3	3	3	4	4	1	4	213
5	(Germany) Jonas Folger	Kalex KTM	5	4	3	4	**6**	DNS	6	8	4	3	6	**Ret**	7	8	6	3	2	183
6	(Portugal) Miguel Oliveira	Mahindra	7	5	16	Ret	4	6	**4**	4	8	9	5	7	5	3	26	4	10	150
7	(Australia) Jack Miller	FTR Honda	16	6	Ret	12	10	7	7	7	Ret	7	7	5	13	6	5	6	Ret	110
8	(France) Alexis Masbou	FTR Honda	14	8	10	9	12	8	9	Ret	12	6	8	Ret	11	7	10	Ret	6	94
9	(Spain) Efrén Vázquez	Mahindra	10	14	8	DNS	DNS	5	12	6	Ret	11	10	12	10	Ret	7	Ret	5	82
10	(Italy) Romano Fenati	FTR Honda	15	Ret	9	7	Ret	15	14	13	9	18	12	10	8	9	14	5	11	73
11	(Czech Republic) Jakub Kornfeil	Kalex KTM	22	10	5	6	Ret	Ret	16	11	10	8	9	13	Ret	13	12	11	16	68
12	(Malaysia) Zulfahmi Khairuddin	KTM	6	7	7	Ret	11	9	17	16	7	15	20	6	Ret	DNS	11	Ret	13	68
13	(South Africa) Brad Binder	Suter Honda	12	9	4	8	14	12	15	9	Ret	Ret	Ret							66
13	(South Africa) Brad Binder	Mahindra												18	12	11	15	10	12	66
14	(Finland) Niklas Ajo	KTM	9	15	6	Ret	8	Ret	10	18	11	Ret	15	11	21	12	9	8	Ret	62
15	(Australia) Arthur Sissis	KTM	8	12	12	13	18	10	8	10	6	14	24	15	9	19	16	16	18	59
16	(Italy) Niccolò Antonelli	FTR Honda	Ret	Ret	Ret	Ret	7	Ret	13	15	16	10	13	8	14	Ret	8	9	27	47
17	(Spain) Isaac Viñales	FTR Honda	Ret	13	17	10	13	11	11	12	Ret	Ret	11	14	18	14	13	Ret	7	47
18	(Germany) Philipp Öttl	Kalex KTM	17	17	20	15	19	18	22	17	19	17	16	9	6	10	Ret	13	9	34
19	(United Kingdom) John McPhee	FTR Honda	Ret	21	11	11	16	19	21	23	20	13	14	20	23	17	17	7	Ret	24
20	(United Kingdom) Danny Webb	Suter Honda	11	11	13	DNS	17	14	Ret											15
21	(Spain) Ana Carrasco	KTM	20	20	Ret	19	26	22	29	24	17	23	22	19	20	15	19	18	8	9
22	(Belgium) Livio Loi	Kalex KTM			15	16	25	Ret	23	22	14	21	19	22	15	18	18	12	Ret	8
23	(France) Alan Techer	TSR Honda	Ret	Ret	Ret	23	20	13	18	19	13	19	Ret	17	Ret	Ret	25	14	DNS	8
24	(Netherlands) Jasper Iwema	Kalex KTM	13	Ret	14	21	15	Ret	Ret	14	Ret	16	28	21	22	Ret	20	25	21	8
25	(Brazil) Eric Granado	Kalex KTM	26	23	19	24	9	26	28	Ret	Ret	22	29	Ret	16	24	21	19	17	7
26	(Italy) Alessandro Tonucci	Honda	18	18	18															6
26	(Italy) Alessandro Tonucci	FTR Honda				14	Ret	16	25	26	Ret	12	Ret	16	27	DNS				6
27	(Italy) Matteo Ferrari	FTR Honda	24	19	21	17	Ret	24	27	20	15	20	17	Ret	Ret	Ret	DNS	Ret	15	2
28	(Japan) Hyuga Watanabe	Honda	27	DNS	24															1
28	(Japan) Hyuga Watanabe	FTR Honda				25	27	23	31	27	Ret	29	23	28	24	22	Ret	15	19	1
	(Italy) Francesco Bagnaia	FTR Honda	23	22	26	20	24	17	26	30	Ret	28	Ret	Ret	17	16	Ret	20	Ret	0
	(Spain) Juan Francisco Guevara	TSR Honda	21	16	Ret	22	Ret	20	Ret	25	Ret	Ret	Ret	27	28	21	27	22	23	0
	(Italy) Lorenzo Baldassarri	FTR Honda	28	Ret	22	Ret	23	21	20	Ret	Ret	Ret	18	23	26	23	24	17	20	0
	(Germany) Florian Alt	Kalex KTM	25	Ret	Ret	Ret		DNS	30	29	18	27	25	Ret	Ret	DNS			26	0
	(Germany) Toni Finsterbusch	Kalex KTM	19	Ret	Ret	18	21	Ret	24	21	Ret	25	21	26	Ret	Ret	23	21	24	0
	(Netherlands) Bryan Schouten	FTR Honda							19						19					0
	(Germany) Luca Amato	Mahindra								Ret				24	25	20	28	Ret	Ret	0
	(Germany) Luca Amato	Suter Honda										30	26							0
	(France) Jules Danilo	Kalex KTM				Ret						24								0
	(France) Jules Danilo	Suter Honda								28	21									0
	(Spain) Jorge Navarro	MIR Racing			Ret															0
	(Spain) Jorge Navarro	MIR Honda																	22	0
	(Germany) Luca Grünwald	Kalex KTM															22	Ret		0
	(Italy) Andrea Locatelli	Mahindra					22							25						0
	(Japan) Sena Yamada	Honda																23		0
	(Malaysia) Hafiq Azmi	KTM														Ret				0
	(Malaysia) Hafiq Azmi	FTR Honda															29	26	25	0
	(Italy) Andrea Migno	FTR						25				26								0
	(Germany) Kevin Hanus	Honda			25			27		Ret										0
	(France) Christophe Arciero	Suter				26														0
	(United Kingdom) Kyle Ryde	KRP Honda											27							0
	(Italy) Michael Coletti	Honda					28													0
	(Spain) María Herrera	KTM													29					0
	(Australia) Lachlan Kavney	Bullet															30			0
	(United Kingdom) Wayne Ryan	KRP Honda											30							0
	(Japan) Hiroki Ono	Honda																Ret		0
	(Malaysia) Aizat Malik	KTM														Ret				0
	(Italy) Luca Marini	FTR Honda												Ret						0
	(Netherlands) Thomas van Leeuwen	Bakker Honda							Ret											0
	(Australia) Callum Barker	Honda															DNQ			0
Pos	Rider	Bike	QAT (Qatar)	AME (United States)	SPA (Spain)	FRA (France)	ITA (Italy)	CAT (Catalonia)	NED (Netherlands)	GER (Germany)	INP (Indianapolis)	CZE (Czech Republic)	GBR (United Kingdom)	RSM (San Marino)	ARA (Aragon)	MAL (Malaysia)	AUS (Australia)	JPN (Japan)	VAL (Valencian Community)	Pts

Colour	Result
Gold	Winner
Silver	Second place
Bronze	Third place
Green	Points classification
Blue	Non-points classification
Blue	Non-classified finish (NC)
Purple	Retired, not classified (Ret)
Red	Did not qualify (DNQ)
Red	Did not pre-qualify (DNPQ)
Black	Disqualified (DSQ)
White	Did not start (DNS)
White	Withdrew (WD)
White	Race cancelled (C)
Blank	Did not practice (DNP)
Blank	Did not arrive (DNA)
Blank	Excluded (EX)

**Bold** – Pole
Italics – Fastest Lap
Light blue – Rookie

=== Constructors' standings ===
Each constructor received the same number of points as their best placed rider in each race.

Pos	Constructor	QAT (Qatar)	AME (United States)	SPA (Spain)	FRA (France)	ITA (Italy)	CAT (Catalonia)	NED (Netherlands)	GER (Germany)	INP (Indianapolis)	CZE (Czech Republic)	GBR (United Kingdom)	RSM (San Marino)	ARA (Aragon)	MAL (Malaysia)	AUS (Australia)	JPN (Japan)	VAL (Valencian Community)	Pts
1	(Austria) KTM	1	1	1	1	1	1	1	1	1	1	1	1	1	1	1	1	1	425
2	(Germany) Kalex KTM	5	4	3	4	6	18	6	8	4	3	6	9	6	8	6	3	2	191
3	(India) Mahindra	7	5	8	Ret	4	5	4	4	8	9	5	7	5	3	7	4	5	173
4	(United Kingdom) FTR Honda	14	6	9	7	7	7	7	7	9	6	7	5	8	6	5	5	6	151
5	(Switzerland) Suter Honda	11	9	4	8	14	12	15	9	21	30	26							47
6	(Japan) TSR Honda	21	16	Ret	22	20	13	18	19	13	19	Ret	17	28	21	25	14	23	8
	(Japan) Honda	18	18	18		28	27		Ret							DNQ	23		0
	(Spain) MIR Honda																	22	0
	(United Kingdom) FTR						25				26								0
	(Switzerland) Suter				26														0
	(United Kingdom) KRP Honda											27							0
	(Australia) Bullet															30			0
	(Netherlands) Bakker Honda							Ret											0
	(Spain) MIR Racing			Ret															0
Pos	Constructor	QAT (Qatar)	AME (United States)	SPA (Spain)	FRA (France)	ITA (Italy)	CAT (Catalonia)	NED (Netherlands)	GER (Germany)	INP (Indianapolis)	CZE (Czech Republic)	GBR (United Kingdom)	RSM (San Marino)	ARA (Aragon)	MAL (Malaysia)	AUS (Australia)	JPN (Japan)	VAL (Valencian Community)	Pts
