= Aizat Malik =

Malaysian motorcycle racer (1994–2014)

- Nationality: (Malaysia) Malaysian
- Born: 5 June 1994
- Died: 25 May 2014 (aged 19); Kota Tinggi, Malaysia
Motorcycle racing career statistics
Moto3 World Championship
Active years	2013
Manufacturers	KTM
2013 championship position	NC (0 pts)
Starts / Wins / Podiums / Poles / F. laps / Points; 1 / 0 / 0 / 0 / 0 / 0

Husni Aizat Abdul Malik (5 June 1994 – 25 May 2014) was a Malaysian motorcycle racer. He competed in the Moto3 World Championship as a wildcard entrant in the 2013 Malaysian Grand Prix. He died in Kota Tinggi on Sunday 25 May 2014 following a road traffic accident.

== Career statistics ==
=== FIM CEV Moto3 Championship ===
==== Races by year ====
(key) (Races in bold indicate pole position; races in italics indicate fastest lap)

Year	Bike	1	2	3	4	5	6	7	8	9	Pos	Pts
2013	KTM	CAT1; 15	CAT2; Ret	ARA; DNS	ALB1; 24	ALB2; 26	NAV; 17	VAL1; 28	VAL1; 22	JER; Ret	39th	1

=== Grand Prix motorcycle racing ===
==== By season ====
Season	Class	Motorcycle	Team	Race	Win	Podium	Pole	FLap	Pts	Plcd
2013	Moto3	KTM	Touchline-SIC-AJO	1	0	0	0	0	0	NC
Total				**1**	**0**	**0**	**0**	**0**	**0**	

==== Races by year ====
Year	Class	Bike	1	2	3	4	5	6	7	8	9	10	11	12	13	14	15	16	17	Pos.	Points
2013	Moto3	KTM	QAT	AME	SPA	FRA	ITA	CAT	NED	GER	INP	CZE	GBR	RSM	ARA	MAL; Ret	AUS	JPN	VAL	NC	0
