= Christophe Arciero =

French motorcycle racer

- Nationality: French
- Born: France
Motorcycle racing career statistics
Moto3 World Championship
Active years	2013
Manufacturers	Suter
2013 championship position	NC (0 pts)
Starts / Wins / Podiums / Poles / F. laps / Points; 1 / 0 / 0 / 0 / 0 / 0

Christophe Arciero (born in France) is a French motorcycle racer.

== Career statistics ==
=== Grand Prix motorcycle racing ===
==== By season ====
Season	Class	Motorcycle	Team	Number	Race	Win	Podium	Pole	FLap	Pts	Plcd
2013	Moto3	Suter	ARC	18	1	0	0	0	0	0	NC
Total					1	0	0	0	0	0	

==== Races by year ====
Year	Class	Bike	1	2	3	4	5	6	7	8	9	10	11	12	13	14	15	16	17	18	Pos.	Points
2013	Moto3	Suter	QAT	AME	SPA	FRA; 26	ITA	CAT	NED	GER	INP	CZE	GBR	RSM	ARA	MAL	AUS	JPN	VAL		NC	0
