= Jules Danilo =

French motorcycle racer

- Nationality: French
- Born: 18 May 1995 (age 31); Milan, Italy
Motorcycle racing career statistics
Moto2 World Championship
Active years	2018
Manufacturers	Kalex
Championships	0
2018 championship position	34th (0 pts)
Starts / Wins / Podiums / Poles / F. laps / Points; 17 / 0 / 0 / 0 / 0 / 0
Moto3 World Championship
Active years	2013–2017
Manufacturers	Kalex KTM, Suter Honda, Mahindra, Honda
Championships	0
2017 championship position	21st (29 pts)
Starts / Wins / Podiums / Poles / F. laps / Points; 76 / 0 / 0 / 0 / 0 / 101
Supersport World Championship
Active years	2019
Manufacturers	Honda
Championships	0
2019 championship position	13th (39 pts)
Starts / Wins / Podiums / Poles / F. laps / Points; 12 / 0 / 0 / 0 / 0 / 39

Jules Danilo (born 18 May 1995) is an Italian-born French motorcycle racer. He has competed in the French 125cc/Moto3 Championship, twice finishing as runner-up in the series in 2012 and 2013, the CEV Moto3 Championship, the Moto3 World Championship, the Moto2 World Championship and the Supersport World Championship.

== Career statistics ==
=== FIM CEV Moto3 Championship ===
==== Races by year ====
(key) (Races in bold indicate pole position; races in italics indicate fastest lap)

Year	Bike	1	2	3	4	5	6	7	8	9	Pos	Pts
2012	Honda	JER	NAV; 14	ARA	CAT; 16	ALB1; 14	ALB2; 12	VAL; 10			21st	14
2013	Kalex KTM	CAT1; Ret	CAT2; DNS	ARA; 5	ALB1; 20	ALB2; 10	NAV	VAL1	VAL1	JER; Ret	19th	17

=== Grand Prix motorcycle racing ===
==== By season ====
Season	Class	Motorcycle	Team	Race	Win	Podium	Pole	FLap	Pts	Plcd
2013	Moto3	Kalex KTM	Marc VDS Racing Team	4	0	0	0	0	0	NC
2013	Moto3	Suter Honda	Ambrogio Racing	4	0	0	0	0	0	NC
2014	Moto3	Mahindra	Ambrogio Racing	18	0	0	0	0	2	30th
2015	Moto3	Honda	Ongetta-Rivacold	18	0	0	0	0	12	26th
2016	Moto3	Honda	Ongetta-Rivacold	18	0	0	0	0	58	20th
2017	Moto3	Honda	Marinelli Rivacold Snipers	18	0	0	0	0	29	21st
2018	Moto2	Kalex	Nashi Argan SAG Team	17	0	0	0	0	0	34th
Total				**93**	**0**	**0**	**0**	**0**	**101**	

==== Races by year ====
(key) (Races in bold indicate pole position, races in italics indicate fastest lap)

Year	Class	Bike	1	2	3	4	5	6	7	8	9	10	11	12	13	14	15	16	17	18	19	Pos	Pts
2013	Moto3	Kalex KTM	QAT	AME	SPA	FRA; Ret	ITA	CAT	NED			CZE; 24	GBR	RSM	ARA	MAL	AUS	JPN	VAL			NC	0
2013	Moto3	Suter Honda								GER; 28	INP; 21											NC	0
2014	Moto3	Mahindra	QAT; Ret	AME; 22	ARG; 24	SPA; 27	FRA; Ret	ITA; 22	CAT; 27	NED; 22	GER; 17	INP; 16	CZE; 18	GBR; 25	RSM; 26	ARA; 14	JPN; 19	AUS; 22	MAL; 17	VAL; Ret		30th	2
2015	Moto3	Honda	QAT; 20	AME; Ret	ARG; Ret	SPA; 12	FRA; Ret	ITA; Ret	CAT; 16	NED; 16	GER; 15	INP; 14	CZE; 27	GBR; Ret	RSM; Ret	ARA; 22	JPN; 19	AUS; Ret	MAL; 11	VAL; 16		26th	12
2016	Moto3	Honda	QAT; 11	ARG; 26	AME; 9	SPA; 9	FRA; Ret	ITA; 11	CAT; Ret	NED; 6	GER; 9	AUT; 16	CZE; 11	GBR; 13	RSM; 14	ARA; 19	JPN; 16	AUS; 9	MAL; Ret	VAL; 26		20th	58
2017	Moto3	Honda	QAT; 17	ARG; 22	AME; 13	SPA; 12	FRA; 7	ITA; Ret	CAT; Ret	NED; 5	GER; 14	CZE; Ret	AUT; 16	GBR; 22	RSM; Ret	ARA; 20	JPN; 18	AUS; Ret	MAL; Ret	VAL; 19		21st	29
2018	Moto2	Kalex	QAT; 27	ARG; Ret	AME; 26	SPA; 24	FRA; 20	ITA; Ret	CAT; 23	NED; 23	GER; DNS	CZE; 22	AUT; 20	GBR; C	RSM; 23	ARA; 26	THA; 20	JPN; 25	AUS; Ret	MAL; 22	VAL; 18	34th	0

=== Supersport World Championship ===
==== Races by year ====
(key) (Races in bold indicate pole position, races in italics indicate fastest lap)

Year	Bike	1	2	3	4	5	6	7	8	9	10	11	12	Pos	Pts
2019	Honda	AUS; 9	THA; Ret	SPA; 12	NED; 10	ITA; 11	SPA; Ret	ITA; 14	GBR; 21	POR; 8	FRA; 12	ARG; 16	QAT; 13	13th	39
