= Arciero =

Arciero is a surname. Notable people with the name include:

- Christophe Arciero, French motorcycle racer
- James Arciero, American state legislator serving in the Massachusetts House of Representatives as a Democrat
- Mariano Arciero (1707–1788), Italian Roman Catholic priest
- Pam Arciero (born 1954), American puppeteer and voice-over artist
