= Hyuga Watanabe =

Japanese motorcycle racer

- Nationality: Japanese
- Born: 23 August 1994 (age 32); Shizuoka, Japan
Motorcycle racing career statistics
Moto3 World Championship
Active years	2012–
Manufacturers	Honda, FTR Honda
Championships	0
2013 championship position	28th (1 pt)
Starts / Wins / Podiums / Poles / F. laps / Points; 17 / 0 / 0 / 0 / 0 / 1
125cc World Championship
Active years	2011
Manufacturers	Honda
Championships	0
2011 championship position	NC (0 pts)
Starts / Wins / Podiums / Poles / F. laps / Points; 1 / 0 / 0 / 0 / 0 / 0

Hyuga Watanabe (渡辺 陽向, Watanabe Hyūga; born 23 August 1994) is a Grand Prix motorcycle racer from Japan. He has previously competed in the MFJ All Japan Road Race GPMono Championship, the MFJ All Japan Road Race J-GP3 Championship, and the Spanish Moto3 series.

In 2013, Watanabe was in a high-speed crash at Moto3 Grand Prix. He avoided injury.

== Career statistics ==
=== CEV Moto3 Championship ===
==== Races by year ====
(key) (Races in bold indicate pole position, races in italics indicate fastest lap)

Year	Bike	1	2	3	4	5	6	7	Pos	Pts
2012	Honda	JER; Ret	NAV; 9	ARA; 10	CAT; 7	ALB1; 3	ALB2; Ret	VAL; Ret	10th	38

=== Grand Prix motorcycle racing ===
==== By season ====
Season	Class	Motorcycle	Team	Number	Race	Win	Podium	Pole	FLap	Pts	Plcd
2011	125cc	Honda	Project u 7C Harc	81	1	0	0	0	0	0	NC
2012	Moto3	Honda	Project U 7C Harc	81	1	0	0	0	0	0	NC
2013	Moto3	Honda	La Fonte Tascaracing	29	16	0	0	0	0	1	28th
2013	Moto3	FTR Honda	La Fonte Tascaracing	29	16	0	0	0	0	1	28th
Total					**18**	**0**	**0**	**0**	**0**	**1**	

==== Races by year ====
Year	Class	Bike	1	2	3	4	5	6	7	8	9	10	11	12	13	14	15	16	17	Pos	Points
2011	125cc	Honda	QAT	SPA	POR	FRA	CAT	GBR	NED	ITA	GER	CZE	INP	RSM	ARA	JPN; Ret	AUS	MAL	VAL	NC	0
2012	Moto3	Honda	QAT	SPA	POR	FRA	CAT	GBR	NED	GER	ITA	INP	CZE	RSM	ARA	JPN; 16	MAL	AUS	VAL	NC	0
2013	Moto3	Honda	QAT; 27	AME; DNS	SPA; 24															28th	1
2013	Moto3	FTR Honda				FRA; 25	ITA; 27	CAT; 23	NED; 31	GER; 27	INP; Ret	CZE; 29	GBR; 23	RSM; 28	ARA; 24	MAL; 22	AUS; Ret	JPN; 15	VAL; 19	28th	1
