= 2013 French motorcycle Grand Prix =

(France) 2013 French Grand Prix
Race details
- Race 4 of 18 races in the 2013 Grand Prix motorcycle racing season
- Date: 19 May 2013
- Official name: Monster Energy Grand Prix de France
- Location: Bugatti Circuit
- Course: Permanent racing facility; 4.185 km (2.600 mi)

MotoGP
Pole position
Rider	(Spain) Marc Márquez	Honda
Time	1:33.187	
Fastest lap
Rider	(Spain) Dani Pedrosa	Honda
Time	1:43.597 on lap 15	
Podium
First	(Spain) Dani Pedrosa	Honda
Second	(United Kingdom) Cal Crutchlow	Yamaha
Third	(Spain) Marc Márquez	Honda

Moto2
Pole position
Rider	(Japan) Takaaki Nakagami	Kalex
Time	1:38.508	
Fastest lap
Rider	(United Kingdom) Scott Redding	Kalex
Time	1:39.117 on lap 19	
Podium
First	(United Kingdom) Scott Redding	Kalex
Second	(Finland) Mika Kallio	Kalex
Third	(Belgium) Xavier Siméon	Kalex

Moto3
Pole position
Rider	(Spain) Maverick Viñales	KTM
Time	1:43.696	
Fastest lap
Rider	(Spain) Maverick Viñales	KTM
Time	1:43.916 on lap 24	
Podium
First	(Spain) Maverick Viñales	KTM
Second	(Spain) Álex Rins	KTM
Third	(Spain) Luis Salom	KTM

The 2013 French motorcycle Grand Prix was the fourth round of the 2013 Grand Prix motorcycle racing season. It took place on the weekend of 17–19 May 2013 at the Bugatti Circuit in Le Mans, France.

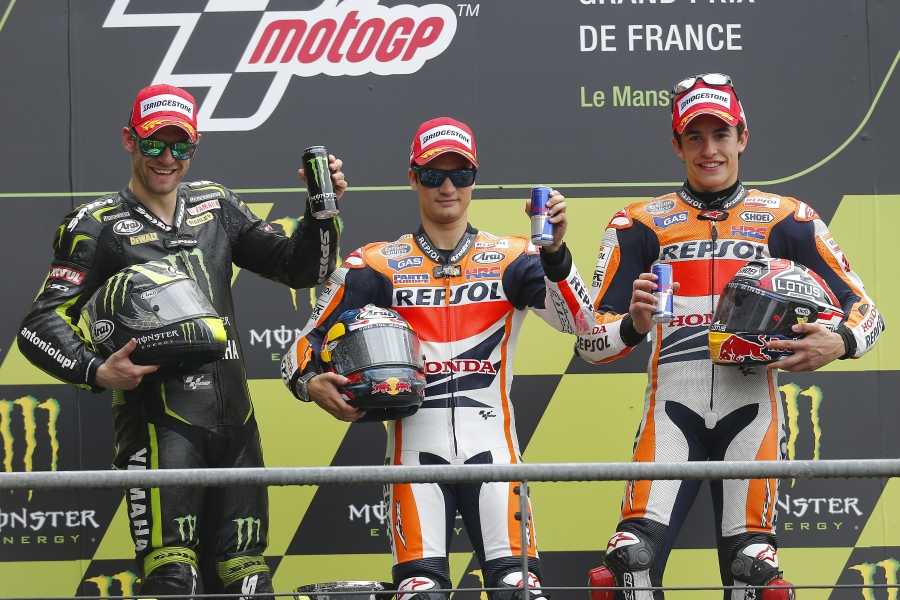
Cal Crutchlow, Dani Pedrosa and Marc Márquez, celebrating on the podium after finishing second, first and third in the MotoGP race.

== Classification ==
=== MotoGP ===
Pos.	No.	Rider	Team	Manufacturer	Laps	Time/Retired	Grid	Points
1	26	(Spain) Dani Pedrosa	Repsol Honda Team	Honda	28	49:17.707	6	25
2	35	(United Kingdom) Cal Crutchlow	Monster Yamaha Tech 3	Yamaha	28	+4.863	4	20
3	93	(Spain) Marc Márquez	Repsol Honda Team	Honda	28	+6.949	1	16
4	4	(Italy) Andrea Dovizioso	Ducati Team	Ducati	28	+10.087	3	13
5	69	(United States) Nicky Hayden	Ducati Team	Ducati	28	+18.471	10	11
6	19	(Spain) Álvaro Bautista	Go&Fun Honda Gresini	Honda	28	+23.561	7	10
7	99	(Spain) Jorge Lorenzo	Yamaha Factory Racing	Yamaha	28	+27.961	2	9
8	51	(Italy) Michele Pirro	Ignite Pramac Racing	Ducati	28	+40.775	14	8
9	38	(United Kingdom) Bradley Smith	Monster Yamaha Tech 3	Yamaha	28	+41.407	9	7
10	6	(Germany) Stefan Bradl	LCR Honda MotoGP	Honda	28	+1:00.995	5	6
11	29	(Italy) Andrea Iannone	Energy T.I. Pramac Racing	Ducati	28	+1:05.110	13	5
12	46	(Italy) Valentino Rossi	Yamaha Factory Racing	Yamaha	28	+1:16.368	8	4
13	41	(Spain) Aleix Espargaró	Power Electronics Aspar	ART	27	+1:24.200	11	3
14	9	(Italy) Danilo Petrucci	Came IodaRacing Project	Ioda-Suter	28	+1:25.726	16	2
15	17	(Czech Republic) Karel Abraham	Cardion AB Motoracing	ART	28	+1:32.111	18	1
16	5	(United States) Colin Edwards	NGM Mobile Forward Racing	FTR Kawasaki	28	+1:40.602	17	
17	70	(United Kingdom) Michael Laverty	Paul Bird Motorsport	PBM	27	+1 lap	20	
18	8	(Spain) Héctor Barberá	Avintia Blusens	FTR	27	+1 lap	15	
19	7	(Japan) Hiroshi Aoyama	Avintia Blusens	FTR	27	+1 lap	24	
Ret	68	(Colombia) Yonny Hernández	Paul Bird Motorsport	ART	20	Retirement	23	
Ret	14	(France) Randy de Puniet	Power Electronics Aspar	ART	15	Accident	12	
Ret	52	(Czech Republic) Lukáš Pešek	Came IodaRacing Project	Ioda-Suter	15	Retirement	22	
Ret	71	(Italy) Claudio Corti	NGM Mobile Forward Racing	FTR Kawasaki	7	Retirement	19	
Ret	67	(Australia) Bryan Staring	Go&Fun Honda Gresini	FTR Honda	1	Accident	21	

=== Moto2 ===
The race was red-flagged on lap 24 of 26 due to rain; the final results were taken from the end of lap 22.

Pos	No	Rider	Manufacturer	Laps	Time	Grid	Points
1	45	(United Kingdom) Scott Redding	Kalex	22	36:43.583	2	25
2	36	(Finland) Mika Kallio	Kalex	22	+1.090	10	20
3	19	(Belgium) Xavier Siméon	Kalex	22	+1.234	5	16
4	77	(Switzerland) Dominique Aegerter	Suter	22	+1.701	13	13
5	5	(France) Johann Zarco	Suter	22	+1.859	3	11
6	54	(Italy) Mattia Pasini	Speed Up	22	+12.272	9	10
7	63	(France) Mike Di Meglio	Motobi	22	+12.378	12	9
8	60	(Spain) Julián Simón	Kalex	22	+29.712	18	8
9	15	(San Marino) Alex de Angelis	Speed Up	22	+31.235	19	7
10	4	(Switzerland) Randy Krummenacher	Suter	22	+31.535	32	6
11	3	(Italy) Simone Corsi	Speed Up	22	+31.675	30	5
12	11	(Germany) Sandro Cortese	Kalex	22	+31.917	17	4
13	23	(Germany) Marcel Schrötter	Kalex	22	+35.778	16	3
14	96	(France) Louis Rossi	Tech 3	22	+45.045	21	2
15	52	(United Kingdom) Danny Kent	Tech 3	22	+45.151	26	1
16	17	(Spain) Alberto Moncayo	Speed Up	22	+55.456	29	
17	72	(Japan) Yuki Takahashi	Moriwaki	22	+59.886	23	
18	7	(Indonesia) Doni Tata Pradita	Suter	22	+1:02.095	33	
19	40	(Spain) Pol Espargaró	Kalex	22	+1:06.414	7	
20	44	(South Africa) Steven Odendaal	Speed Up	22	+1:48.007	27	
21	55	(Malaysia) Hafizh Syahrin	Kalex	21	+1 lap	25	
22	80	(Spain) Esteve Rabat	Kalex	20	+2 laps	4	
23	97	(Indonesia) Rafid Topan Sucipto	Speed Up	19	+3 laps	34	
DSQ	95	(Australia) Anthony West	Speed Up	22	(+30.479)	11	
NC	88	(Spain) Ricard Cardús	Speed Up	22	+1:29.658	20	
NC	8	(United Kingdom) Gino Rea	FTR	12	+10 laps	31	
Ret	24	(Spain) Toni Elías	Kalex	19	Retirement	14	
Ret	18	(Spain) Nicolás Terol	Suter	17	Accident	6	
Ret	30	(Japan) Takaaki Nakagami	Kalex	6	Accident	1	
Ret	12	(Switzerland) Thomas Lüthi	Suter	4	Retirement	8	
Ret	81	(Spain) Jordi Torres	Suter	2	Accident	15	
Ret	9	(United Kingdom) Kyle Smith	Kalex	0	Accident	22	
Ret	49	(Spain) Axel Pons	Kalex	0	Accident	24	
Ret	14	(Thailand) Ratthapark Wilairot	Suter	0	Accident	28	
OFFICIAL MOTO2 REPORT

=== Moto3 ===
Pos	No	Rider	Manufacturer	Laps	Time/Retired	Grid	Points
1	25	(Spain) Maverick Viñales	KTM	24	42:05.448	1	25
2	42	(Spain) Álex Rins	KTM	24	+1.264	4	20
3	39	(Spain) Luis Salom	KTM	24	+1.387	5	16
4	94	(Germany) Jonas Folger	Kalex KTM	24	+14.593	3	13
5	12	(Spain) Álex Márquez	KTM	24	+37.949	7	11
6	84	(Czech Republic) Jakub Kornfeil	Kalex KTM	24	+40.295	14	10
7	5	(Italy) Romano Fenati	FTR Honda	24	+43.325	11	9
8	41	(South Africa) Brad Binder	Suter Honda	24	+43.537	12	8
9	10	(France) Alexis Masbou	FTR Honda	24	+45.511	10	7
10	32	(Spain) Isaac Viñales	FTR Honda	24	+45.674	8	6
11	17	(United Kingdom) John McPhee	FTR Honda	24	+51.452	18	5
12	8	(Australia) Jack Miller	FTR Honda	24	+51.592	6	4
13	61	(Australia) Arthur Sissis	KTM	24	+58.713	19	3
14	19	(Italy) Alessandro Tonucci	FTR Honda	24	+58.970	16	2
15	65	(Germany) Philipp Öttl	Kalex KTM	24	+1:18.027	28	1
16	11	(Belgium) Livio Loi	Kalex KTM	24	+1:18.384	20	
17	3	(Italy) Matteo Ferrari	FTR Honda	24	+1:23.388	30	
18	9	(Germany) Toni Finsterbusch	Kalex KTM	24	+1:27.726	22	
19	22	(Spain) Ana Carrasco	KTM	24	+1:27.754	23	
20	4	(Italy) Francesco Bagnaia	FTR Honda	24	+1:27.860	27	
21	53	(Netherlands) Jasper Iwema	Kalex KTM	24	+1:28.165	29	
22	58	(Spain) Juan Francisco Guevara	TSR Honda	24	+1:30.631	24	
23	89	(France) Alan Techer	TSR Honda	24	+1:30.841	21	
24	57	(Brazil) Eric Granado	Kalex KTM	23	+1 lap	26	
25	29	(Japan) Hyuga Watanabe	FTR Honda	23	+1 lap	32	
26	18	(France) Christophe Arciero	Suter	23	+1 lap	33	
Ret	77	(Italy) Lorenzo Baldassarri	FTR Honda	20	Accident	13	
Ret	63	(Malaysia) Zulfahmi Khairuddin	KTM	19	Accident	15	
Ret	31	(Finland) Niklas Ajo	KTM	19	Accident	9	
Ret	95	(France) Jules Danilo	Kalex KTM	13	Accident	25	
Ret	23	(Italy) Niccolò Antonelli	FTR Honda	12	Accident	17	
Ret	66	(Germany) Florian Alt	Kalex KTM	6	Retirement	31	
Ret	44	(Portugal) Miguel Oliveira	Mahindra	4	Accident	2	
DNS	99	(United Kingdom) Danny Webb	Suter Honda		Did not start		
DNS	7	(Spain) Efrén Vázquez	Mahindra		Did not start		
OFFICIAL MOTO3 REPORT

== Championship standings after the race (MotoGP) ==
Below are the standings for the top five riders and constructors after round four has concluded.

Riders' Championship standings

Pos.	Rider	Points
1	(Spain) Dani Pedrosa	83
2	(Spain) Marc Márquez	77
3	(Spain) Jorge Lorenzo	66
4	(United Kingdom) Cal Crutchlow	55
5	(Italy) Valentino Rossi	47

Constructors' Championship standings

Pos.	Constructor	Points
1	(Japan) Honda	91
2	(Japan) Yamaha	77
3	(Italy) Ducati	40
4	(Italy) ART	20
5	(United Kingdom) FTR	7

- Note: Only the top five positions are included for both sets of standings.

Previous race: 2013 Spanish Grand Prix	FIM Grand Prix World Championship; 2013 season	Next race: 2013 Italian Grand Prix
Previous race: 2012 French Grand Prix	French motorcycle Grand Prix	Next race: 2014 French Grand Prix
