= 2013 Czech Republic motorcycle Grand Prix =

2013 Czech Republic Grand Prix
Race details
- Race 11 of 18 races in the 2013 Grand Prix motorcycle racing season
- Date: 25 August 2013
- Official name: bwin Grand Prix České Republiky
- Location: Brno Circuit
- Course: Permanent racing facility; 5.403 km (3.357 mi)

MotoGP
Pole position
Rider	(United Kingdom) Cal Crutchlow	Yamaha
Time	1:55.527	
Fastest lap
Rider	(Spain) Marc Márquez	Honda
Time	1:56.135 on lap 3	
Podium
First	(Spain) Marc Márquez	Honda
Second	(Spain) Dani Pedrosa	Honda
Third	(Spain) Jorge Lorenzo	Yamaha

Moto2
Pole position
Rider	(Japan) Takaaki Nakagami	Kalex
Time	2:02.202	
Fastest lap
Rider	(France) Johann Zarco	Suter
Time	2:02.605 on lap 20	
Podium
First	(Finland) Mika Kallio	Kalex
Second	(Japan) Takaaki Nakagami	Kalex
Third	(Switzerland) Thomas Lüthi	Suter

Moto3
Pole position
Rider	(Spain) Álex Rins	KTM
Time	2:07.622	
Fastest lap
Rider	(Spain) Luis Salom	KTM
Time	2:08.307 on lap 19	
Podium
First	(Spain) Luis Salom	KTM
Second	(Spain) Maverick Viñales	KTM
Third	(Germany) Jonas Folger	Kalex KTM

The 2013 Czech Republic motorcycle Grand Prix was the eleventh round of the 2013 MotoGP season. It was held at the Brno Circuit in Brno on 25 August 2013.

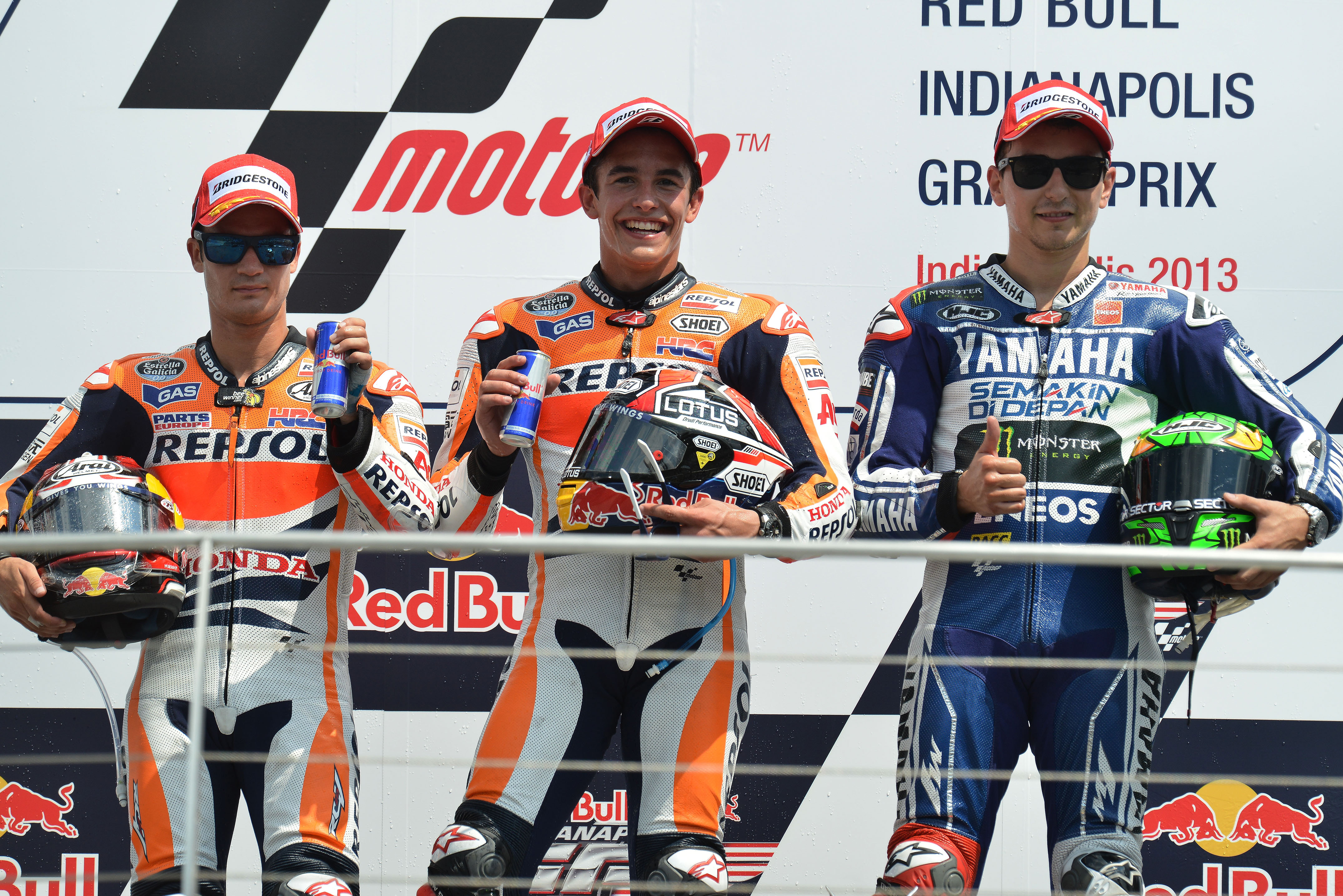
Dani Pedrosa, Marc Márquez and Jorge Lorenzo, celebrating on the podium after finishing second, first and third at the MotoGP race.

== Classification ==
=== MotoGP ===
Pos.	No.	Rider	Team	Manufacturer	Laps	Time/Retired	Grid	Points
1	93	(Spain) Marc Márquez	Repsol Honda Team	Honda	22	42:50.729	3	25
2	26	(Spain) Dani Pedrosa	Repsol Honda Team	Honda	22	+0.313	4	20
3	99	(Spain) Jorge Lorenzo	Yamaha Factory Racing	Yamaha	22	+2.277	5	16
4	46	(Italy) Valentino Rossi	Yamaha Factory Racing	Yamaha	22	+10.101	7	13
5	19	(Spain) Álvaro Bautista	Go&Fun Honda Gresini	Honda	22	+10.178	2	11
6	6	(Germany) Stefan Bradl	LCR Honda MotoGP	Honda	22	+19.807	8	10
7	4	(Italy) Andrea Dovizioso	Ducati Team	Ducati	22	+35.015	9	9
8	69	(United States) Nicky Hayden	Ducati Team	Ducati	22	+35:354	10	8
9	29	(Italy) Andrea Iannone	Energy T.I. Pramac Racing	Ducati	22	+51.149	11	7
10	41	(Spain) Aleix Espargaró	Power Electronics Aspar	ART	22	+56.392	13	6
11	5	(United States) Colin Edwards	NGM Mobile Forward Racing	FTR Kawasaki	22	+57.420	12	5
12	51	(Italy) Michele Pirro	Ignite Pramac Racing	Ducati	22	+1:05.430	14	4
13	9	(Italy) Danilo Petrucci	Came IodaRacing Project	Ioda-Suter	22	+1:12.364	17	3
14	7	(Japan) Hiroshi Aoyama	Avintia Blusens	FTR	22	+1:13.500	22	2
15	14	(France) Randy de Puniet	Power Electronics Aspar	ART	22	+1:14.128	15	1
16	68	(Colombia) Yonny Hernández	Paul Bird Motorsport	ART	22	+1:14.991	16	
17	35	(United Kingdom) Cal Crutchlow	Monster Yamaha Tech 3	Yamaha	22	+1:20.640	1	
18	70	(United Kingdom) Michael Laverty	Paul Bird Motorsport	PBM	22	+1:34.462	21	
19	17	(Czech Republic) Karel Abraham	Cardion AB Motoracing	ART	22	+1:49.713	23	
20	67	(Australia) Bryan Staring	Go&Fun Honda Gresini	FTR Honda	22	+1:50.024	24	
21	45	(Austria) Martin Bauer	Remus Racing Team	S&B Suter	21	+1 lap	25	
Ret	38	(United Kingdom) Bradley Smith	Monster Yamaha Tech 3	Yamaha	2	Accident	6	
Ret	52	(Czech Republic) Lukáš Pešek	Came IodaRacing Project	Ioda-Suter	2	Accident	20	
Ret	71	(Italy) Claudio Corti	NGM Mobile Forward Racing	FTR Kawasaki	1	Accident	18	
Ret	8	(Spain) Héctor Barberá	Avintia Blusens	FTR	1	Accident	19	

=== Moto2 ===
Pos.	No.	Rider	Manufacturer	Laps	Time/Retired	Grid	Points
1	36	(Finland) Mika Kallio	Kalex	20	41:11.785	4	25
2	30	(Japan) Takaaki Nakagami	Kalex	20	+0.590	1	20
3	12	(Switzerland) Thomas Lüthi	Suter	20	+0.799	8	16
4	40	(Spain) Pol Espargaró	Kalex	20	+0.965	2	13
5	5	(France) Johann Zarco	Suter	20	+1.100	7	11
6	18	(Spain) Nicolás Terol	Suter	20	+1.539	9	10
7	80	(Spain) Esteve Rabat	Kalex	20	+2.496	3	9
8	45	(United Kingdom) Scott Redding	Kalex	20	+4.490	13	8
9	3	(Italy) Simone Corsi	Speed Up	20	+5.777	15	7
10	81	(Spain) Jordi Torres	Suter	20	+5.796	6	6
11	19	(Belgium) Xavier Siméon	Kalex	20	+8.641	19	5
12	52	(United Kingdom) Danny Kent	Tech 3	20	+12.425	12	4
13	77	(Switzerland) Dominique Aegerter	Suter	20	+12.490	10	3
14	54	(Italy) Mattia Pasini	Speed Up	20	+18.597	16	2
15	24	(Spain) Toni Elías	Kalex	20	+24.427	18	1
16	4	(Switzerland) Randy Krummenacher	Suter	20	+24.497	22	
17	72	(Japan) Yuki Takahashi	Moriwaki	20	+29.530	20	
18	88	(Spain) Ricard Cardús	Speed Up	20	+29.619	25	
19	96	(France) Louis Rossi	Tech 3	20	+35.853	28	
20	49	(Spain) Axel Pons	Kalex	20	+39.607	27	
21	27	(Spain) Dani Rivas	Kalex	20	+49.056	30	
22	99	(France) Lucas Mahias	TransFIORmers	20	+52.616	31	
23	7	(Indonesia) Doni Tata Pradita	Suter	20	+59.011	32	
24	10	(Thailand) Thitipong Warokorn	Suter	20	+1:35.752	34	
25	97	(Indonesia) Rafid Topan Sucipto	Speed Up	20	+1:36.434	33	
DSQ	95	(Australia) Anthony West	Speed Up	20	(+24.867)	24	
Ret	11	(Germany) Sandro Cortese	Kalex	18	Accident	5	
Ret	63	(France) Mike Di Meglio	Motobi	15	Accident	17	
Ret	23	(Germany) Marcel Schrötter	Kalex	15	Accident	11	
Ret	17	(Spain) Alberto Moncayo	Speed Up	15	Accident	23	
Ret	15	(San Marino) Alex de Angelis	Speed Up	14	Accident	21	
Ret	44	(South Africa) Steven Odendaal	Speed Up	12	Accident	26	
Ret	8	(United Kingdom) Gino Rea	FTR	6	Retirement	29	
Ret	60	(Spain) Julián Simón	Kalex	4	Retirement	14	
OFFICIAL MOTO2 REPORT

=== Moto3 ===
Pos.	No.	Rider	Manufacturer	Laps	Time/Retired	Grid	Points
1	39	(Spain) Luis Salom	KTM	19	40:58.770	5	25
2	25	(Spain) Maverick Viñales	KTM	19	+0.507	2	20
3	94	(Germany) Jonas Folger	Kalex KTM	19	+1.015	7	16
4	42	(Spain) Álex Rins	KTM	19	+1.081	1	13
5	12	(Spain) Álex Márquez	KTM	19	+1.240	6	11
6	10	(France) Alexis Masbou	FTR Honda	19	+4.787	3	10
7	8	(Australia) Jack Miller	FTR Honda	19	+17.638	4	9
8	84	(Czech Republic) Jakub Kornfeil	Kalex KTM	19	+21.380	12	8
9	44	(Portugal) Miguel Oliveira	Mahindra	19	+21.404	10	7
10	23	(Italy) Niccolò Antonelli	FTR Honda	19	+21.516	16	6
11	7	(Spain) Efrén Vázquez	Mahindra	19	+21.779	9	5
12	19	(Italy) Alessandro Tonucci	FTR Honda	19	+22.654	14	4
13	17	(United Kingdom) John McPhee	FTR Honda	19	+24.037	11	3
14	61	(Australia) Arthur Sissis	KTM	19	+31.044	8	2
15	63	(Malaysia) Zulfahmi Khairuddin	KTM	19	+39.198	24	1
16	53	(Netherlands) Jasper Iwema	Kalex KTM	19	+39.267	26	
17	65	(Germany) Philipp Öttl	Kalex KTM	19	+39.541	29	
18	5	(Italy) Romano Fenati	FTR Honda	19	+39.620	21	
19	89	(France) Alan Techer	TSR Honda	19	+39.795	22	
20	3	(Italy) Matteo Ferrari	FTR Honda	19	+39.890	17	
21	11	(Belgium) Livio Loi	Kalex KTM	19	+39.947	23	
22	57	(Brazil) Eric Granado	Kalex KTM	19	+40.111	15	
23	22	(Spain) Ana Carrasco	KTM	19	+45.275	30	
24	95	(France) Jules Danilo	Kalex KTM	19	+45.436	34	
25	9	(Germany) Toni Finsterbusch	Kalex KTM	19	+45.631	25	
26	16	(Italy) Andrea Migno	FTR	19	+48.727	32	
27	66	(Germany) Florian Alt	Kalex KTM	19	+49.315	33	
28	4	(Italy) Francesco Bagnaia	FTR Honda	19	+49.348	31	
29	29	(Japan) Hyuga Watanabe	FTR Honda	19	+1:06.151	27	
30	21	(Germany) Luca Amato	Suter Honda	19	+1:27.089	35	
Ret	77	(Italy) Lorenzo Baldassarri	FTR Honda	12	Accident	18	
Ret	41	(South Africa) Brad Binder	Suter Honda	12	Accident	19	
Ret	58	(Spain) Juan Francisco Guevara	TSR Honda	12	Retirement	28	
Ret	32	(Spain) Isaac Viñales	FTR Honda	0	Retirement	13	
Ret	31	(Finland) Niklas Ajo	KTM	0	Accident	20	
OFFICIAL MOTO3 REPORT

== Championship standings after the race (MotoGP) ==
Below are the standings for the top five riders and constructors after round eleven has concluded.

Riders' Championship standings

Pos.	Rider	Points
1	(Spain) Marc Márquez	213
2	(Spain) Dani Pedrosa	187
3	(Spain) Jorge Lorenzo	169
4	(Italy) Valentino Rossi	143
5	(United Kingdom) Cal Crutchlow	127

Constructors' Championship standings

Pos.	Constructor	Points
1	(Japan) Honda	251
2	(Japan) Yamaha	220
3	(Italy) Ducati	99
4	(Italy) ART	64
5	(United Kingdom) FTR	28

- Note: Only the top five positions are included for both sets of standings.

Previous race: 2013 Indianapolis Grand Prix	FIM Grand Prix World Championship; 2013 season	Next race: 2013 British Grand Prix
Previous race: 2012 Czech Republic Grand Prix	Czech Republic motorcycle Grand Prix	Next race: 2014 Czech Republic Grand Prix
