= 2013 Indianapolis motorcycle Grand Prix =

Motorcycle race

2013 Indianapolis Grand Prix
Race details
- Race 10 of 18 races in the 2013 Grand Prix motorcycle racing season
- Date: August 18, 2013
- Official name: Red Bull Indianapolis Grand Prix
- Location: Indianapolis Motor Speedway
- Course: Permanent racing facility; 4.216 km (2.620 mi)

MotoGP
Pole position
Rider	(Spain) Marc Márquez	Honda
Time	1:37.958	
Fastest lap
Rider	(Spain) Marc Márquez	Honda
Time	1:39.044 on lap 18	
Podium
First	(Spain) Marc Márquez	Honda
Second	(Spain) Dani Pedrosa	Honda
Third	(Spain) Jorge Lorenzo	Yamaha

Moto2
Pole position
Rider	(United Kingdom) Scott Redding	Kalex
Time	1:43.026	
Fastest lap
Rider	(Spain) Julián Simón	Kalex
Time	1:43.511 on lap 5	
Podium
First	(Spain) Esteve Rabat	Kalex
Second	(Japan) Takaaki Nakagami	Kalex
Third	(United Kingdom) Scott Redding	Kalex

Moto3
Pole position
Rider	(Spain) Álex Rins	KTM
Time	1:47.392	
Fastest lap
Rider	(Spain) Maverick Viñales	KTM
Time	1:47.433 on lap 7	
Podium
First	(Spain) Álex Rins	KTM
Second	(Spain) Álex Márquez	KTM
Third	(Spain) Maverick Viñales	KTM

The 2013 Indianapolis motorcycle Grand Prix was the tenth round of the 2013 MotoGP season. It was held at the Indianapolis Motor Speedway in Indianapolis on August 18, 2013.

Ben Spies crashed heavily in practice, and the resulting injuries caused the end of his racing career.

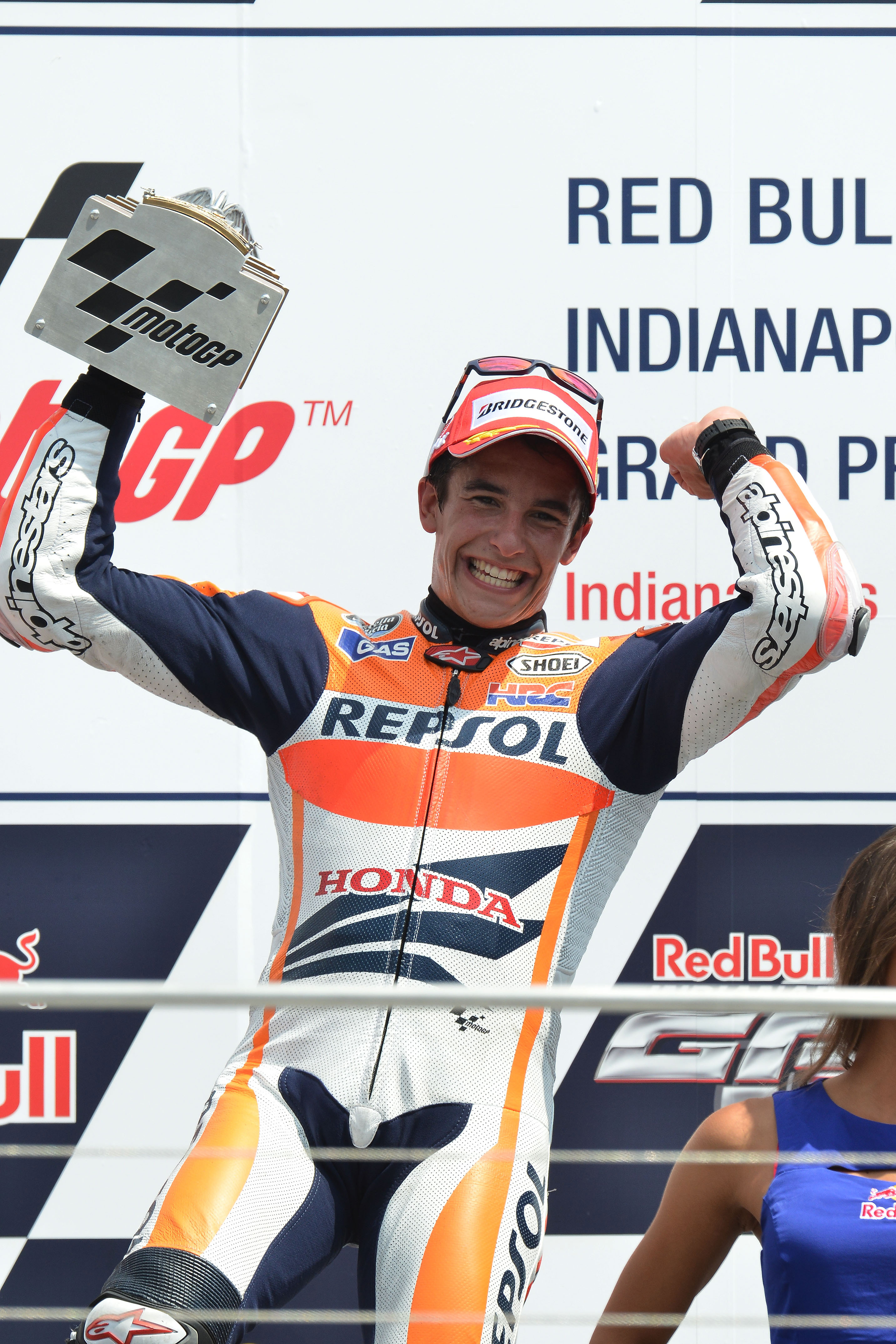
Marc Márquez, celebrating on the podium after winning the MotoGP race.

== Classification ==
=== MotoGP ===
Pos.	No.	Rider	Team	Manufacturer	Laps	Time/Retired	Grid	Points
1	93	(Spain) Marc Márquez	Repsol Honda Team	Honda	27	44:52.463	1	25
2	26	(Spain) Dani Pedrosa	Repsol Honda Team	Honda	27	+3.495	3	20
3	99	(Spain) Jorge Lorenzo	Yamaha Factory Racing	Yamaha	27	+5.704	2	16
4	46	(Italy) Valentino Rossi	Yamaha Factory Racing	Yamaha	27	+19.895	9	13
5	35	(United Kingdom) Cal Crutchlow	Monster Yamaha Tech 3	Yamaha	27	+19.955	4	11
6	19	(Spain) Álvaro Bautista	Go&Fun Honda Gresini	Honda	27	+20.061	5	10
7	6	(Germany) Stefan Bradl	LCR Honda MotoGP	Honda	27	+24.842	8	9
8	38	(United Kingdom) Bradley Smith	Monster Yamaha Tech 3	Yamaha	27	+40.690	7	8
9	69	(United States) Nicky Hayden	Ducati Team	Ducati	27	+40.701	6	7
10	4	(Italy) Andrea Dovizioso	Ducati Team	Ducati	27	+40.823	10	6
11	29	(Italy) Andrea Iannone	Energy T.I. Pramac Racing	Ducati	27	+59.668	11	5
12	41	(Spain) Aleix Espargaró	Power Electronics Aspar	ART	27	+1:06.650	13	4
13	5	(United States) Colin Edwards	NGM Mobile Forward Racing	FTR Kawasaki	27	+1:09.462	12	3
14	71	(Italy) Claudio Corti	NGM Mobile Forward Racing	FTR Kawasaki	27	+1:15.207	16	2
15	7	(Japan) Hiroshi Aoyama	Avintia Blusens	FTR	27	+1:20.159	19	1
16	8	(Spain) Héctor Barberá	Avintia Blusens	FTR	27	+1:25.879	17	
17	9	(Italy) Danilo Petrucci	Came IodaRacing Project	Ioda-Suter	27	+1:29.616	14	
18	70	(United Kingdom) Michael Laverty	Paul Bird Motorsport	PBM	27	+1:36.388	18	
19	67	(Australia) Bryan Staring	Go&Fun Honda Gresini	FTR Honda	26	+1 lap	20	
Ret	68	(Colombia) Yonny Hernández	Paul Bird Motorsport	ART	17	Retirement	21	
Ret	52	(Czech Republic) Lukáš Pešek	Came IodaRacing Project	Ioda-Suter	14	Retirement	22	
Ret	14	(France) Randy de Puniet	Power Electronics Aspar	ART	5	Retirement	15	
Ret	79	(United States) Blake Young	Attack Performance Racing	APR	0	Accident	23	
DNS	17	(Czech Republic) Karel Abraham	Cardion AB Motoracing	ART		Injured		
DNS	11	(United States) Ben Spies	Ignite Pramac Racing	Ducati		Injured		

=== Moto2 ===
Pos	No	Rider	Manufacturer	Laps	Time	Grid	Points
1	80	(Spain) Esteve Rabat	Kalex	25	43:47.432	4	25
2	30	(Japan) Takaaki Nakagami	Kalex	25	+0.766	3	20
3	45	(United Kingdom) Scott Redding	Kalex	25	+1.741	1	16
4	40	(Spain) Pol Espargaró	Kalex	25	+2.628	2	13
5	77	(Switzerland) Dominique Aegerter	Suter	25	+2.708	12	11
6	3	(Italy) Simone Corsi	Speed Up	25	+8.528	5	10
7	36	(Finland) Mika Kallio	Kalex	25	+8.892	15	9
8	5	(France) Johann Zarco	Suter	25	+9.029	11	8
9	19	(Belgium) Xavier Siméon	Kalex	25	+9.278	13	7
10	81	(Spain) Jordi Torres	Suter	25	+10.754	7	6
11	60	(Spain) Julián Simón	Kalex	25	+11.298	9	5
12	18	(Spain) Nicolás Terol	Suter	25	+13.003	6	4
13	12	(Switzerland) Thomas Lüthi	Suter	25	+14.513	14	3
14	15	(San Marino) Alex de Angelis	Speed Up	25	+14.640	18	2
15	23	(Germany) Marcel Schrötter	Kalex	25	+15.745	8	1
16	11	(Germany) Sandro Cortese	Kalex	25	+23.272	10	
17	24	(Spain) Toni Elías	Kalex	25	+27.420	22	
18	88	(Spain) Ricard Cardús	Speed Up	25	+31.798	21	
19	4	(Switzerland) Randy Krummenacher	Suter	25	+33.679	17	
20	63	(France) Mike Di Meglio	Motobi	25	+34.229	19	
21	72	(Japan) Yuki Takahashi	Moriwaki	25	+35.680	24	
22	52	(United Kingdom) Danny Kent	Tech 3	25	+43.281	20	
23	96	(France) Louis Rossi	Tech 3	25	+50.783	25	
24	43	(United States) James Rispoli	Tech 3 Mistral 610	25	+52.757	29	
25	54	(Italy) Mattia Pasini	Speed Up	25	+1:00.878	16	
26	17	(Spain) Alberto Moncayo	Speed Up	25	+1:01.507	27	
27	44	(South Africa) Steven Odendaal	Speed Up	25	+1:13.906	32	
28	7	(Indonesia) Doni Tata Pradita	Suter	25	+1:17.953	31	
29	10	(Thailand) Thitipong Warokorn	Suter	25	+1:23.599	30	
30	97	(Indonesia) Rafid Topan Sucipto	Speed Up	24	+1 lap	33	
DSQ	95	(Australia) Anthony West	Speed Up	25	(+27.312)	23	
Ret	9	(United Kingdom) Kyle Smith	Kalex	11	Accident	28	
DNS	49	(Spain) Axel Pons	Kalex		Did not start	26	
OFFICIAL MOTO2 REPORT

=== Moto3 ===
Pos	No	Rider	Manufacturer	Laps	Time/Retired	Grid	Points
1	42	(Spain) Álex Rins	KTM	23	41:37.200	1	25
2	12	(Spain) Álex Márquez	KTM	23	+0.177	2	20
3	25	(Spain) Maverick Viñales	KTM	23	+1.076	3	16
4	94	(Germany) Jonas Folger	Kalex KTM	23	+8.638	7	13
5	39	(Spain) Luis Salom	KTM	23	+9.261	10	11
6	61	(Australia) Arthur Sissis	KTM	23	+14.439	6	10
7	63	(Malaysia) Zulfahmi Khairuddin	KTM	23	+18.602	9	9
8	44	(Portugal) Miguel Oliveira	Mahindra	23	+21.067	8	8
9	5	(Italy) Romano Fenati	FTR Honda	23	+21.132	15	7
10	84	(Czech Republic) Jakub Kornfeil	Kalex KTM	23	+21.867	16	6
11	31	(Finland) Niklas Ajo	KTM	23	+27.018	24	5
12	10	(France) Alexis Masbou	FTR Honda	23	+27.181	20	4
13	89	(France) Alan Techer	TSR Honda	23	+27.863	17	3
14	11	(Belgium) Livio Loi	Kalex KTM	23	+32.656	11	2
15	3	(Italy) Matteo Ferrari	FTR Honda	23	+41.588	22	1
16	23	(Italy) Niccolò Antonelli	FTR Honda	23	+41.851	13	
17	22	(Spain) Ana Carrasco	KTM	23	+55.272	31	
18	66	(Germany) Florian Alt	Kalex KTM	23	+55.346	25	
19	65	(Germany) Philipp Öttl	Kalex KTM	23	+55.351	26	
20	17	(United Kingdom) John McPhee	FTR Honda	23	+55.742	30	
21	95	(France) Jules Danilo	Suter Honda	23	+1:11.156	33	
Ret	7	(Spain) Efrén Vázquez	Mahindra	20	Retirement	4	
Ret	19	(Italy) Alessandro Tonucci	FTR Honda	20	Retirement	12	
Ret	29	(Japan) Hyuga Watanabe	FTR Honda	16	Accident	29	
Ret	32	(Spain) Isaac Viñales	FTR Honda	14	Retirement	14	
Ret	4	(Italy) Francesco Bagnaia	FTR Honda	14	Retirement	32	
Ret	41	(South Africa) Brad Binder	Suter Honda	8	Retirement	19	
Ret	58	(Spain) Juan Francisco Guevara	TSR Honda	6	Accident	21	
Ret	57	(Brazil) Eric Granado	Kalex KTM	5	Retirement	18	
Ret	9	(Germany) Toni Finsterbusch	Kalex KTM	4	Retirement	28	
Ret	8	(Australia) Jack Miller	FTR Honda	3	Accident	5	
Ret	77	(Italy) Lorenzo Baldassarri	FTR Honda	3	Accident	23	
Ret	53	(Netherlands) Jasper Iwema	Kalex KTM	0	Accident	27	
OFFICIAL MOTO3 REPORT

== Championship standings after the race (MotoGP) ==
Below are the standings for the top five riders and constructors after round ten has concluded.

Riders' Championship standings

Pos.	Rider	Points
1	(Spain) Marc Márquez	188
2	(Spain) Dani Pedrosa	167
3	(Spain) Jorge Lorenzo	153
4	(Italy) Valentino Rossi	130
5	(United Kingdom) Cal Crutchlow	127

Constructors' Championship standings

Pos.	Constructor	Points
1	(Japan) Honda	226
2	(Japan) Yamaha	204
3	(Italy) Ducati	90
4	(Italy) ART	58
5	(United Kingdom) FTR	26

- Note: Only the top five positions are included for both sets of standings.

Previous race: 2013 United States Grand Prix	FIM Grand Prix World Championship; 2013 season	Next race: 2013 Czech Republic Grand Prix
Previous race: 2012 Indianapolis Grand Prix	Indianapolis motorcycle Grand Prix	Next race: 2014 Indianapolis Grand Prix
