= 2013 Aragon motorcycle Grand Prix =

2013 MotoGP race

2013 Aragon Grand Prix
Race details
- Race 14 of 18 races in the 2013 Grand Prix motorcycle racing season
- Date: 29 September 2013
- Official name: Gran Premio Iveco de Aragón
- Location: MotorLand Aragón
- Course: Permanent racing facility; 5.078 km (3.155 mi)

MotoGP
Pole position
Rider	(Spain) Marc Márquez	Honda
Time	1:47.804	
Fastest lap
Rider	(Spain) Dani Pedrosa	Honda
Time	1:48.565 on lap 2	
Podium
First	(Spain) Marc Márquez	Honda
Second	(Spain) Jorge Lorenzo	Yamaha
Third	(Italy) Valentino Rossi	Yamaha

Moto2
Pole position
Rider	(Spain) Nicolás Terol	Suter
Time	1:53.812	
Fastest lap
Rider	(Spain) Esteve Rabat	Kalex
Time	1:54.288 on lap 13	
Podium
First	(Spain) Nicolás Terol	Suter
Second	(Spain) Esteve Rabat	Kalex
Third	(Spain) Pol Espargaró	Kalex

Moto3
Pole position
Rider	(Spain) Álex Rins	KTM
Time	1:58.571	
Fastest lap
Rider	(Germany) Philipp Öttl	Kalex KTM
Time	1:59.681 on lap 3	
Podium
First	(Spain) Álex Rins	KTM
Second	(Spain) Maverick Viñales	KTM
Third	(Spain) Álex Márquez	KTM

The 2013 Aragon motorcycle Grand Prix was the fourteenth round of the 2013 MotoGP season. It was held at the MotorLand Aragón in Alcañiz on 29 September 2013.

== Classification ==
=== MotoGP ===
Pos.	No.	Rider	Team	Manufacturer	Laps	Time/Retired	Grid	Points
1	93	(Spain) Marc Márquez	Repsol Honda Team	Honda	23	42:03.459	1	25
2	99	(Spain) Jorge Lorenzo	Yamaha Factory Racing	Yamaha	23	+1.356	2	20
3	46	(Italy) Valentino Rossi	Yamaha Factory Racing	Yamaha	23	+12.927	4	16
4	19	(Spain) Álvaro Bautista	Go&Fun Honda Gresini	Honda	23	+13.787	6	13
5	6	(Germany) Stefan Bradl	LCR Honda MotoGP	Honda	23	+13.973	5	11
6	35	(United Kingdom) Cal Crutchlow	Monster Yamaha Tech 3	Yamaha	23	+14.662	7	10
7	38	(United Kingdom) Bradley Smith	Monster Yamaha Tech 3	Yamaha	23	+31.220	8	9
8	4	(Italy) Andrea Dovizioso	Ducati Team	Ducati	23	+40.671	9	8
9	69	(United States) Nicky Hayden	Ducati Team	Ducati	23	+53.413	11	7
10	29	(Italy) Andrea Iannone	Energy T.I. Pramac Racing	Ducati	23	+55.067	12	6
11	41	(Spain) Aleix Espargaró	Power Electronics Aspar	ART	23	+58.001	10	5
12	68	(Colombia) Yonny Hernández	Ignite Pramac Racing	Ducati	23	+1:05.513	13	4
13	14	(France) Randy de Puniet	Power Electronics Aspar	ART	23	+1:06.589	16	3
14	7	(Japan) Hiroshi Aoyama	Avintia Blusens	FTR	23	+1:08.674	14	2
15	71	(Italy) Claudio Corti	NGM Mobile Forward Racing	FTR Kawasaki	23	+1:09.130	18	1
16	5	(United States) Colin Edwards	NGM Mobile Forward Racing	FTR Kawasaki	23	+1:12.041	17	
17	23	(Italy) Luca Scassa	Cardion AB Motoracing	ART	23	+1:45.152	22	
18	67	(Australia) Bryan Staring	Go&Fun Honda Gresini	FTR Honda	23	+1:45.228	21	
19	52	(Czech Republic) Lukáš Pešek	Came IodaRacing Project	Ioda-Suter	23	+1:45.583	23	
Ret	8	(Spain) Héctor Barberá	Avintia Blusens	FTR	8	Retirement	19	
Ret	26	(Spain) Dani Pedrosa	Repsol Honda Team	Honda	5	Collision	3	
Ret	50	(Australia) Damian Cudlin	Paul Bird Motorsport	PBM	3	Gearbox	24	
Ret	9	(Italy) Danilo Petrucci	Came IodaRacing Project	Ioda-Suter	0	Collision	15	
Ret	70	(United Kingdom) Michael Laverty	Paul Bird Motorsport	ART	0	Collision	20	

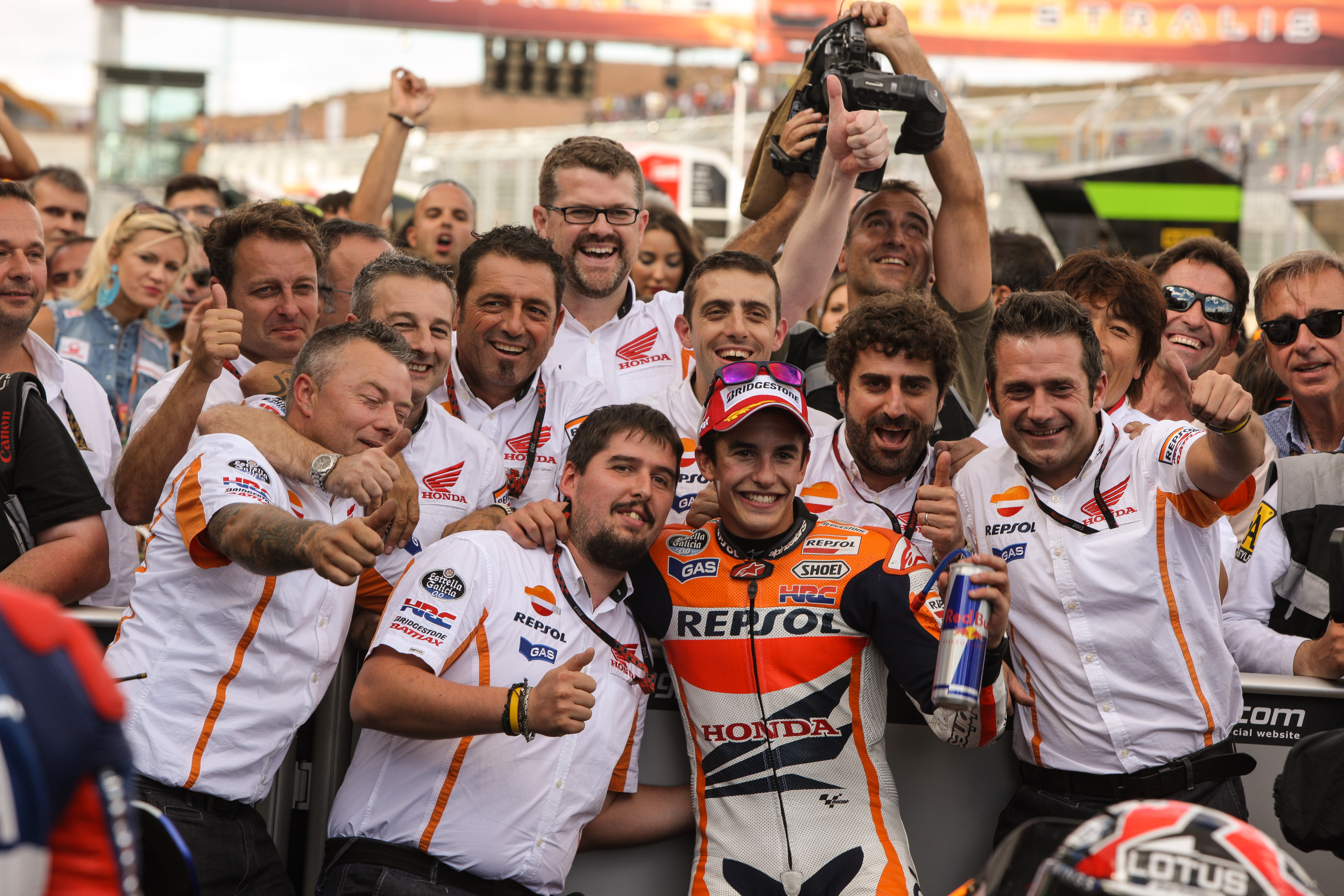
Marc Márquez, celebrating with the team at parc fermé after finishing first at the MotoGP race.

=== Moto2 ===
Pos	No	Rider	Manufacturer	Laps	Time	Grid	Points
1	18	(Spain) Nicolás Terol	Suter	21	40:15.232	1	25
2	80	(Spain) Esteve Rabat	Kalex	21	+1.736	2	20
3	40	(Spain) Pol Espargaró	Kalex	21	+3.530	3	16
4	45	(United Kingdom) Scott Redding	Kalex	21	+3.783	13	13
5	36	(Finland) Mika Kallio	Kalex	21	+4.049	15	11
6	81	(Spain) Jordi Torres	Suter	21	+11.602	5	10
7	5	(France) Johann Zarco	Suter	21	+16.298	10	9
8	60	(Spain) Julián Simón	Kalex	21	+18.765	7	8
9	54	(Italy) Mattia Pasini	Speed Up	21	+22.266	12	7
10	11	(Germany) Sandro Cortese	Kalex	21	+23.757	9	6
11	30	(Japan) Takaaki Nakagami	Kalex	21	+23.924	4	5
12	23	(Germany) Marcel Schrötter	Kalex	21	+24.487	20	4
13	77	(Switzerland) Dominique Aegerter	Suter	21	+28.011	19	3
14	92	(Spain) Álex Mariñelarena	Kalex	21	+33.120	17	2
15	52	(United Kingdom) Danny Kent	Tech 3	21	+43.909	16	1
16	49	(Spain) Axel Pons	Kalex	21	+44.230	24	
17	8	(United Kingdom) Gino Rea	FTR	21	+44.293	21	
18	96	(France) Louis Rossi	Tech 3	21	+47.587	23	
19	88	(Spain) Ricard Cardús	Speed Up	21	+47.678	22	
20	28	(Spain) Román Ramos	Motobi	21	+52.153	25	
21	17	(Spain) Alberto Moncayo	Speed Up	21	+53.848	29	
22	7	(Indonesia) Doni Tata Pradita	Suter	21	+1:24.099	31	
23	70	(Switzerland) Robin Mulhauser	Suter	21	+1:26.887	28	
24	10	(Thailand) Thitipong Warokorn	Suter	21	+1:37.241	30	
25	97	(Indonesia) Rafid Topan Sucipto	Speed Up	20	+1 lap	32	
Ret	15	(San Marino) Alex de Angelis	Speed Up	20	Accident	8	
DSQ	95	(Australia) Anthony West	Speed Up	14	(Accident)	18	
Ret	3	(Italy) Simone Corsi	Speed Up	7	Accident	6	
Ret	25	(Malaysia) Azlan Shah	Moriwaki	5	Accident	26	
Ret	34	(Argentina) Ezequiel Iturrioz	Kalex	1	Retirement	33	
Ret	12	(Switzerland) Thomas Lüthi	Suter	0	Accident	11	
Ret	19	(Belgium) Xavier Siméon	Kalex	0	Collision	14	
Ret	44	(South Africa) Steven Odendaal	Speed Up	0	Collision	27	
OFFICIAL MOTO2 REPORT

=== Moto3 ===
Pos	No	Rider	Manufacturer	Laps	Time/Retired	Grid	Points
1	42	(Spain) Álex Rins	KTM	20	40:04.214	1	25
2	25	(Spain) Maverick Viñales	KTM	20	+0.426	2	20
3	12	(Spain) Álex Márquez	KTM	20	+12.377	3	16
4	39	(Spain) Luis Salom	KTM	20	+16.416	8	13
5	44	(Portugal) Miguel Oliveira	Mahindra	20	+16.496	7	11
6	65	(Germany) Philipp Öttl	Kalex KTM	20	+21.539	4	10
7	94	(Germany) Jonas Folger	Kalex KTM	20	+25.255	6	9
8	5	(Italy) Romano Fenati	FTR Honda	20	+27.711	13	8
9	61	(Australia) Arthur Sissis	KTM	20	+27.888	9	7
10	7	(Spain) Efrén Vázquez	Mahindra	20	+28.977	5	6
11	10	(France) Alexis Masbou	FTR Honda	20	+29.601	12	5
12	41	(South Africa) Brad Binder	Mahindra	20	+29.748	14	4
13	8	(Australia) Jack Miller	FTR Honda	20	+33.833	20	3
14	23	(Italy) Niccolò Antonelli	FTR Honda	20	+33.850	15	2
15	11	(Belgium) Livio Loi	Kalex KTM	20	+47.978	18	1
16	57	(Brazil) Eric Granado	Kalex KTM	20	+48.137	25	
17	4	(Italy) Francesco Bagnaia	FTR Honda	20	+48.190	17	
18	32	(Spain) Isaac Viñales	FTR Honda	20	+48.725	23	
19	51	(Netherlands) Bryan Schouten	FTR Honda	20	+48.731	32	
20	22	(Spain) Ana Carrasco	KTM	20	+48.792	16	
21	31	(Finland) Niklas Ajo	KTM	20	+48.796	26	
22	53	(Netherlands) Jasper Iwema	Kalex KTM	20	+49.336	22	
23	17	(United Kingdom) John McPhee	FTR Honda	20	+52.739	27	
24	29	(Japan) Hyuga Watanabe	FTR Honda	20	+52.850	33	
25	21	(Germany) Luca Amato	Mahindra	20	+52.911	30	
26	77	(Italy) Lorenzo Baldassarri	FTR Honda	20	+57.726	29	
27	19	(Italy) Alessandro Tonucci	FTR Honda	20	+57.813	24	
28	58	(Spain) Juan Francisco Guevara	TSR Honda	20	+1:38.348	35	
29	6	(Spain) María Herrera	KTM	20	+1:54.722	31	
Ret	63	(Malaysia) Zulfahmi Khairuddin	KTM	15	Collision	11	
Ret	3	(Italy) Matteo Ferrari	FTR Honda	11	Accident	34	
Ret	66	(Germany) Florian Alt	Kalex KTM	11	Retirement	28	
Ret	9	(Germany) Toni Finsterbusch	Kalex KTM	7	Accident	19	
Ret	84	(Czech Republic) Jakub Kornfeil	Kalex KTM	3	Accident	10	
Ret	89	(France) Alan Techer	TSR Honda	1	Accident	21	
OFFICIAL MOTO3 REPORT

== Championship standings after the race (MotoGP) ==
Below are the standings for the top five riders and constructors after round fourteen has concluded.

Riders' Championship standings

Pos.	Rider	Points
1	(Spain) Marc Márquez	278
2	(Spain) Jorge Lorenzo	239
3	(Spain) Dani Pedrosa	219
4	(Italy) Valentino Rossi	185
5	(United Kingdom) Cal Crutchlow	156

Constructors' Championship standings

Pos.	Constructor	Points
1	(Japan) Honda	304^{1}
2	(Japan) Yamaha	290
3	(Italy) Ducati	123
4	(Italy) ART	78
5	(United Kingdom) FTR	35

Notes:

- Only the top five positions are included for both sets of standings.
- ^{1} All points from the race victory for Marc Márquez were deducted as a result of a decision from Race Direction, after Márquez collided with teammate Dani Pedrosa during the race. Honda's next-best finisher was Álvaro Bautista, who scored a fourth-place finish.

Previous race: 2013 San Marino Grand Prix	FIM Grand Prix World Championship; 2013 season	Next race: 2013 Malaysian Grand Prix
Previous race: 2012 Aragon Grand Prix	Aragon motorcycle Grand Prix	Next race: 2014 Aragon Grand Prix
