= 2013 Italian motorcycle Grand Prix =

(Italy) 2013 Italian Grand Prix
Race details
- Race 5 of 18 races in the 2013 Grand Prix motorcycle racing season
- Date: 2 June 2013
- Official name: Gran Premio d'Italia TIM
- Location: Mugello Circuit
- Course: Permanent racing facility; 5.245 km (3.259 mi)

MotoGP
Pole position
Rider	(Spain) Dani Pedrosa	Honda
Time	1:47.157	
Fastest lap
Rider	(Spain) Marc Márquez	Honda
Time	1:47.639 on lap 2	
Podium
First	(Spain) Jorge Lorenzo	Yamaha
Second	(Spain) Dani Pedrosa	Honda
Third	(United Kingdom) Cal Crutchlow	Yamaha

Moto2
Pole position
Rider	(United Kingdom) Scott Redding	Kalex
Time	1:52.958	
Fastest lap
Rider	(France) Johann Zarco	Suter
Time	1:53.095 on lap 6	
Podium
First	(United Kingdom) Scott Redding	Kalex
Second	(Spain) Nicolás Terol	Suter
Third	(France) Johann Zarco	Suter

Moto3
Pole position
Rider	(Germany) Jonas Folger	Kalex KTM
Time	1:57.603	
Fastest lap
Rider	(Portugal) Miguel Oliveira	Mahindra
Time	1:58.000 on lap 4	
Podium
First	(Spain) Luis Salom	KTM
Second	(Spain) Álex Rins	KTM
Third	(Spain) Maverick Viñales	KTM

The 2013 Italian motorcycle Grand Prix was the fifth round of the 2013 MotoGP season. It was held at the Mugello Circuit in Scarperia on 2 June 2013.

Jorge Lorenzo took the victory, ahead of pole sitter Dani Pedrosa, and Cal Crutchlow. Valentino Rossi and Álvaro Bautista collided on lap 1, the barriers being torn apart on impact, and Marc Márquez slid wide into the gravel trap with 3 laps to go, suffering his first MotoGP retirement, whilst riding in a comfortable second place.

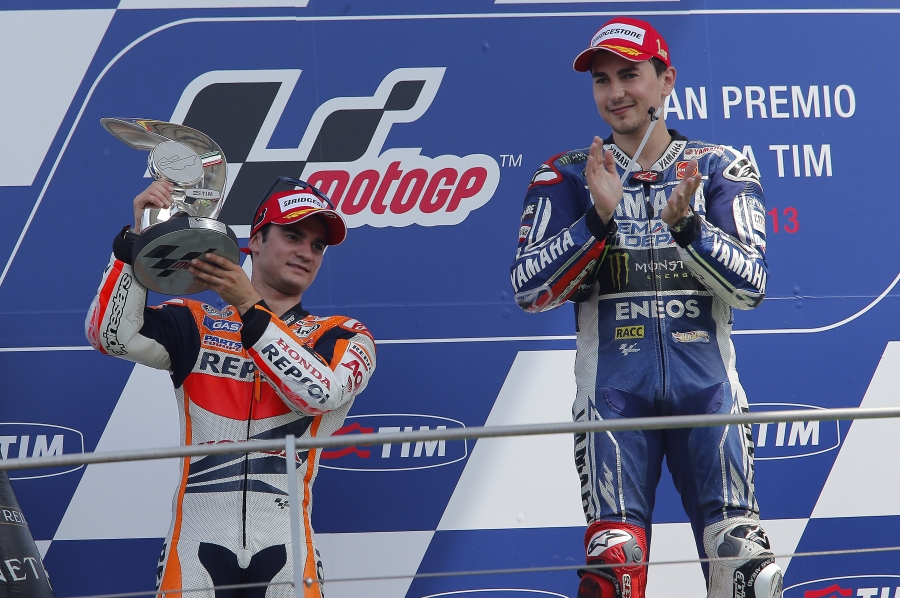
Dani Pedrosa and Jorge Lorenzo, celebrating on the podium after finishing second and first at the MotoGP race.

== Classification ==
=== MotoGP ===
Pos.	No.	Rider	Team	Manufacturer	Laps	Time/Retired	Grid	Points
1	99	(Spain) Jorge Lorenzo	Yamaha Factory Racing	Yamaha	23	41:39.733	2	25
2	26	(Spain) Dani Pedrosa	Repsol Honda Team	Honda	23	+5.400	1	20
3	35	(United Kingdom) Cal Crutchlow	Monster Yamaha Tech 3	Yamaha	23	+6.412	4	16
4	6	(Germany) Stefan Bradl	LCR Honda MotoGP	Honda	23	+19.321	5	13
5	4	(Italy) Andrea Dovizioso	Ducati Team	Ducati	23	+19.540	3	11
6	69	(United States) Nicky Hayden	Ducati Team	Ducati	23	+26.321	8	10
7	51	(Italy) Michele Pirro	Ducati Test Team	Ducati	23	+38.144	10	9
8	41	(Spain) Aleix Espargaró	Power Electronics Aspar	ART	23	+39.802	12	8
9	38	(United Kingdom) Bradley Smith	Monster Yamaha Tech 3	Yamaha	23	+40.243	11	7
10	8	(Spain) Héctor Barberá	Avintia Blusens	FTR	23	+48.392	15	6
11	14	(France) Randy de Puniet	Power Electronics Aspar	ART	23	+48.480	14	5
12	9	(Italy) Danilo Petrucci	Came IodaRacing Project	Ioda-Suter	23	+1:13.708	16	4
13	29	(Italy) Andrea Iannone	Energy T.I. Pramac Racing	Ducati	23	+1:14.601	13	3
14	5	(United States) Colin Edwards	NGM Mobile Forward Racing	FTR Kawasaki	23	+1:21.249	17	2
15	17	(Czech Republic) Karel Abraham	Cardion AB Motoracing	ART	23	+1:25.738	20	1
16	68	(Colombia) Yonny Hernández	Paul Bird Motorsport	ART	23	+1:27.339	21	
17	70	(United Kingdom) Michael Laverty	Paul Bird Motorsport	PBM	23	+1:27.758	19	
18	67	(Australia) Bryan Staring	Go&Fun Honda Gresini	FTR Honda	23	+1:44.424	22	
19	52	(Czech Republic) Lukáš Pešek	Came IodaRacing Project	Ioda-Suter	23	+1:45.227	24	
Ret	93	(Spain) Marc Márquez	Repsol Honda Team	Honda	20	Accident	6	
Ret	71	(Italy) Claudio Corti	NGM Mobile Forward Racing	FTR Kawasaki	17	Electrical	18	
Ret	7	(Japan) Hiroshi Aoyama	Avintia Blusens	FTR	16	Retirement	23	
Ret	46	(Italy) Valentino Rossi	Yamaha Factory Racing	Yamaha	0	Collision	7	
Ret	19	(Spain) Álvaro Bautista	Go&Fun Honda Gresini	Honda	0	Collision	9	
DNS	11	(United States) Ben Spies	Ignite Pramac Racing	Ducati		Did not start		

=== Moto2 ===
Pos	No	Rider	Manufacturer	Laps	Time	Grid	Points
1	45	(United Kingdom) Scott Redding	Kalex	21	39:53.942	1	25
2	18	(Spain) Nicolás Terol	Suter	21	+2.175	5	20
3	5	(France) Johann Zarco	Suter	21	+4.387	4	16
4	40	(Spain) Pol Espargaró	Kalex	21	+9.787	10	13
5	36	(Finland) Mika Kallio	Kalex	21	+9.851	13	11
6	81	(Spain) Jordi Torres	Suter	21	+10.644	9	10
7	3	(Italy) Simone Corsi	Speed Up	21	+10.718	11	9
8	15	(San Marino) Alex de Angelis	Speed Up	21	+10.844	8	8
9	12	(Switzerland) Thomas Lüthi	Suter	21	+10.900	12	7
10	77	(Switzerland) Dominique Aegerter	Suter	21	+12.166	14	6
11	24	(Spain) Toni Elías	Kalex	21	+12.173	21	5
12	23	(Germany) Marcel Schrötter	Kalex	21	+15.871	3	4
13	80	(Spain) Esteve Rabat	Kalex	21	+27.919	6	3
14	11	(Germany) Sandro Cortese	Kalex	21	+28.688	15	2
15	4	(Switzerland) Randy Krummenacher	Suter	21	+28.973	16	1
16	14	(Thailand) Ratthapark Wilairot	Suter	21	+29.323	22	
17	60	(Spain) Julián Simón	Kalex	21	+32.176	17	
18	63	(France) Mike Di Meglio	Motobi	21	+33.762	20	
19	88	(Spain) Ricard Cardús	Speed Up	21	+42.145	25	
20	9	(United Kingdom) Kyle Smith	Kalex	21	+45.584	31	
21	52	(United Kingdom) Danny Kent	Tech 3	21	+45.962	26	
22	17	(Spain) Alberto Moncayo	Speed Up	21	+51.091	30	
23	72	(Japan) Yuki Takahashi	Moriwaki	21	+1:02.477	28	
24	54	(Italy) Mattia Pasini	Speed Up	21	+1:11.895	19	
25	96	(France) Louis Rossi	Tech 3	21	+1:25.369	24	
DSQ	95	(Australia) Anthony West	Speed Up	21	(+44.322)	23	
Ret	19	(Belgium) Xavier Siméon	Kalex	17	Accident	7	
Ret	49	(Spain) Axel Pons	Kalex	16	Accident	18	
Ret	44	(South Africa) Steven Odendaal	Speed Up	9	Accident	29	
Ret	30	(Japan) Takaaki Nakagami	Kalex	8	Accident	2	
Ret	7	(Indonesia) Doni Tata Pradita	Suter	0	Accident	27	
Ret	97	(Indonesia) Rafid Topan Sucipto	Speed Up	0	Accident	32	
OFFICIAL MOTO2 REPORT

=== Moto3 ===
Pos	No	Rider	Manufacturer	Laps	Time/Retired	Grid	Points
1	39	(Spain) Luis Salom	KTM	20	39:53.827	5	25
2	42	(Spain) Álex Rins	KTM	20	+0.099	3	20
3	25	(Spain) Maverick Viñales	KTM	20	+0.303	2	16
4	44	(Portugal) Miguel Oliveira	Mahindra	20	+0.757	6	13
5	12	(Spain) Álex Márquez	KTM	20	+0.819	10	11
6	94	(Germany) Jonas Folger	Kalex KTM	20	+1.433	1	10
7	23	(Italy) Niccolò Antonelli	FTR Honda	20	+16.464	7	9
8	31	(Finland) Niklas Ajo	KTM	20	+18.627	23	8
9	57	(Brazil) Eric Granado	Kalex KTM	20	+18.957	15	7
10	8	(Australia) Jack Miller	FTR Honda	20	+19.026	4	6
11	63	(Malaysia) Zulfahmi Khairuddin	KTM	20	+19.147	18	5
12	10	(France) Alexis Masbou	FTR Honda	20	+19.154	16	4
13	32	(Spain) Isaac Viñales	FTR Honda	20	+20.813	13	3
14	41	(South Africa) Brad Binder	Suter Honda	20	+21.241	11	2
15	53	(Netherlands) Jasper Iwema	Kalex KTM	20	+28.582	19	1
16	17	(United Kingdom) John McPhee	FTR Honda	20	+28.583	14	
17	99	(United Kingdom) Danny Webb	Suter Honda	20	+28.671	9	
18	61	(Australia) Arthur Sissis	KTM	20	+29.214	25	
19	65	(Germany) Philipp Öttl	Kalex KTM	20	+30.401	24	
20	89	(France) Alan Techer	TSR Honda	20	+30.614	12	
21	9	(Germany) Toni Finsterbusch	Kalex KTM	20	+30.657	33	
22	55	(Italy) Andrea Locatelli	Mahindra	20	+30.658	21	
23	77	(Italy) Lorenzo Baldassarri	FTR Honda	20	+30.679	27	
24	4	(Italy) Francesco Bagnaia	FTR Honda	20	+30.798	31	
25	11	(Belgium) Livio Loi	Kalex KTM	20	+42.025	30	
26	22	(Spain) Ana Carrasco	KTM	20	+53.508	32	
27	29	(Japan) Hyuga Watanabe	FTR Honda	20	+53.586	29	
28	93	(Italy) Michael Coletti	Honda	20	+1:00.848	28	
Ret	3	(Italy) Matteo Ferrari	FTR Honda	19	Accident	22	
Ret	84	(Czech Republic) Jakub Kornfeil	Kalex KTM	19	Accident	8	
Ret	5	(Italy) Romano Fenati	FTR Honda	17	Accident	20	
Ret	58	(Spain) Juan Francisco Guevara	TSR Honda	3	Retirement	26	
Ret	19	(Italy) Alessandro Tonucci	FTR Honda	2	Accident	17	
DNS	7	(Spain) Efrén Vázquez	Mahindra		Did not start		
OFFICIAL MOTO3 REPORT

== Championship standings after the race (MotoGP) ==
Below are the standings for the top five riders and constructors after round five has concluded.

Riders' Championship standings

Pos.	Rider	Points
1	(Spain) Dani Pedrosa	103
2	(Spain) Jorge Lorenzo	91
3	(Spain) Marc Márquez	77
4	(United Kingdom) Cal Crutchlow	71
5	(Italy) Andrea Dovizioso	50

Constructors' Championship standings

Pos.	Constructor	Points
1	(Japan) Honda	111
2	(Japan) Yamaha	102
3	(Italy) Ducati	51
4	(Italy) ART	28
5	(United Kingdom) FTR	13

- Note: Only the top five positions are included for both sets of standings.

Previous race: 2013 French Grand Prix	FIM Grand Prix World Championship; 2013 season	Next race: 2013 Catalan Grand Prix
Previous race: 2012 Italian Grand Prix	Italian motorcycle Grand Prix	Next race: 2014 Italian Grand Prix
