= 2013 Australian motorcycle Grand Prix =

(Australia) 2013 Australian Grand Prix
Race details
- Race 16 of 18 races in the 2013 Grand Prix motorcycle racing season
- Date: 20 October 2013
- Official name: Tissot Australian Motorcycle Grand Prix
- Location: Phillip Island Grand Prix Circuit
- Course: Permanent racing facility; 4.448 km (2.764 mi)

MotoGP
Pole position
Rider	(Spain) Jorge Lorenzo	Yamaha
Time	1:27.899	
Fastest lap
Rider	(Spain) Marc Márquez	Honda
Time	1:28.108 on lap 13	
Podium
First	(Spain) Jorge Lorenzo	Yamaha
Second	(Spain) Dani Pedrosa	Honda
Third	(Italy) Valentino Rossi	Yamaha

Moto2
Pole position
Rider	(Spain) Pol Espargaró	Kalex
Time	1:32.530	
Fastest lap
Rider	(San Marino) Alex de Angelis	Speed Up
Time	1:32.814 on lap 13	
Podium
First	(Spain) Pol Espargaró	Kalex
Second	(Switzerland) Thomas Lüthi	Suter
Third	(Spain) Jordi Torres	Suter

Moto3
Pole position
Rider	(Spain) Luis Salom	KTM
Time	1:36.890	
Fastest lap
Rider	(Spain) Álex Márquez	KTM
Time	1:37.073 on lap 8	
Podium
First	(Spain) Álex Rins	KTM
Second	(Spain) Maverick Viñales	KTM
Third	(Spain) Luis Salom	KTM

The 2013 Australian motorcycle Grand Prix was the sixteenth round of the 2013 MotoGP season. It was held at the Phillip Island Grand Prix Circuit in Phillip Island on 20 October 2013.

The MotoGP race was originally scheduled to run over 27 laps but was shortened to 19 laps after Bridgestone announced that the safety of its tyres on the newly resurfaced track could not be guaranteed after 10 laps. Riders were required to make a pitstop to swap bikes or change tyres at least once during the race, and no rider was permitted to use the same set of tyres for more than 10 laps. Marc Márquez and Bryan Staring were both disqualified for riding an 11-lap stint without pitting. Jorge Lorenzo won the race and closed up the gap to Márquez in the championship to 18 points. The Moto2 race distance was also shortened, from 25 to 13 laps.

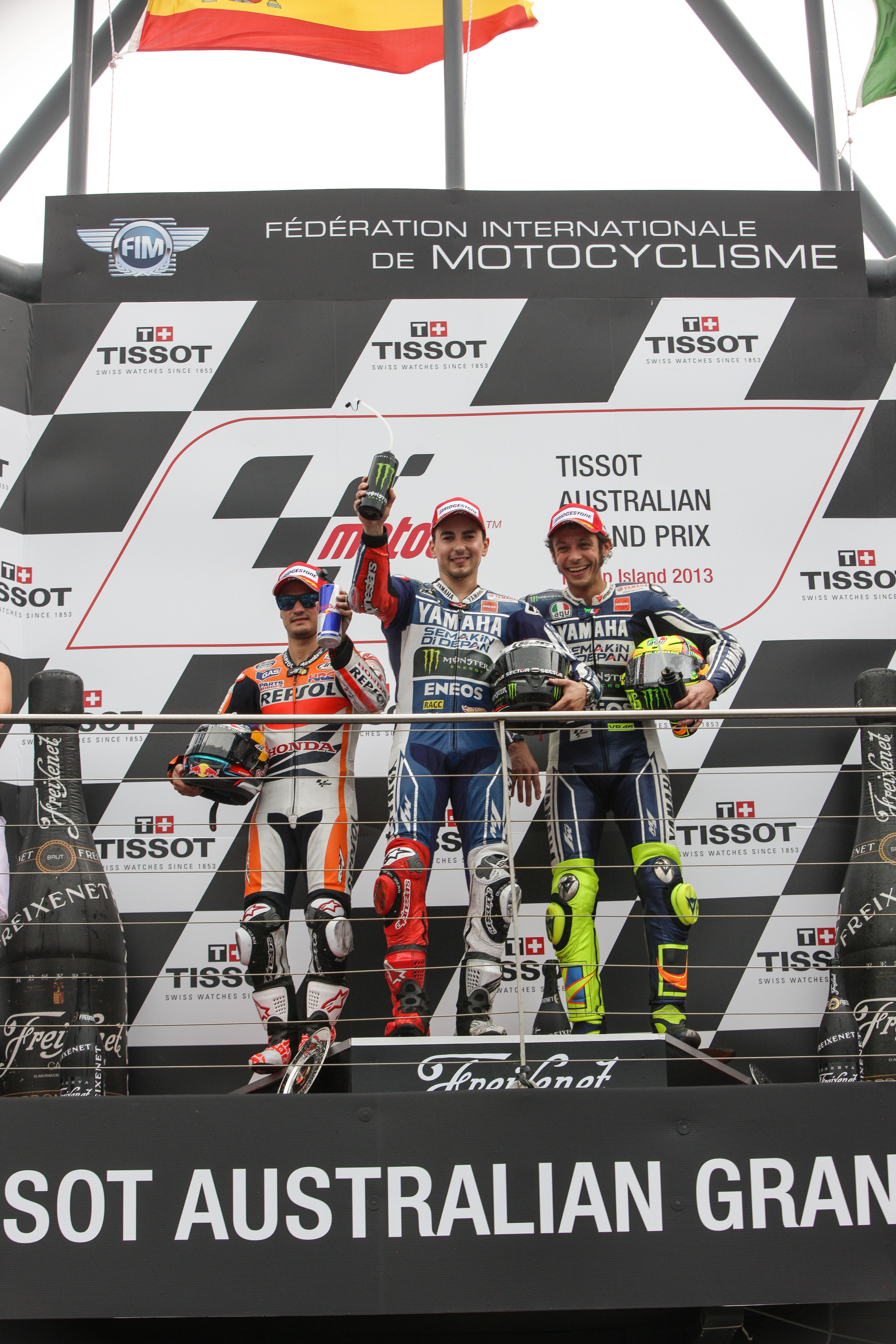
Dani Pedrosa, Jorge Lorenzo and Valentino Rossi on the podium after finishing second, first and third in the MotoGP race.

== Classification ==
=== MotoGP ===
Pos.	No.	Rider	Team	Manufacturer	Laps	Time/Retired	Grid	Points
1	99	(Spain) Jorge Lorenzo	Yamaha Factory Racing	Yamaha	19	29:07.155	1	25
2	26	(Spain) Dani Pedrosa	Repsol Honda Team	Honda	19	+6.936	5	20
3	46	(Italy) Valentino Rossi	Yamaha Factory Racing	Yamaha	19	+12.344	3	16
4	35	(United Kingdom) Cal Crutchlow	Monster Yamaha Tech 3	Yamaha	19	+12.460	6	13
5	19	(Spain) Álvaro Bautista	Go&Fun Honda Gresini	Honda	19	+12.513	4	11
6	38	(United Kingdom) Bradley Smith	Monster Yamaha Tech 3	Yamaha	19	+28.263	7	10
7	69	(United States) Nicky Hayden	Ducati Team	Ducati	19	+32.953	8	9
8	29	(Italy) Andrea Iannone	Energy T.I. Pramac Racing	Ducati	19	+35.062	10	8
9	4	(Italy) Andrea Dovizioso	Ducati Team	Ducati	19	+35.104	9	7
10	14	(France) Randy de Puniet	Power Electronics Aspar	ART	19	+37.426	12	6
11	41	(Spain) Aleix Espargaró	Power Electronics Aspar	ART	19	+46.099	13	5
12	5	(United States) Colin Edwards	NGM Mobile Forward Racing	FTR Kawasaki	19	+48.149	11	4
13	68	(Colombia) Yonny Hernández	Ignite Pramac Racing	Ducati	19	+49.911	15	3
14	8	(Spain) Héctor Barberá	Avintia Blusens	FTR	19	+49.998	19	2
15	9	(Italy) Danilo Petrucci	Came IodaRacing Project	Ioda-Suter	19	+58.718	17	1
16	23	(Italy) Luca Scassa	Cardion AB Motoracing	ART	19	+58.791	20	
17	71	(Italy) Claudio Corti	NGM Mobile Forward Racing	FTR Kawasaki	19	+1:08.105	14	
18	70	(United Kingdom) Michael Laverty	Paul Bird Motorsport	ART	19	+1:27.230	18	
19	52	(Czech Republic) Lukáš Pešek	Came IodaRacing Project	Ioda-Suter	19	+1:31.093	22	
20	7	(Japan) Hiroshi Aoyama	Avintia Blusens	FTR	18	+1 lap	16	
21	50	(Australia) Damian Cudlin	Paul Bird Motorsport	PBM	17	+2 laps	23	
DSQ	93	(Spain) Marc Márquez	Repsol Honda Team	Honda	14	Disqualified	2	
DSQ	67	(Australia) Bryan Staring	Go&Fun Honda Gresini	FTR Honda	14	Disqualified	21	
DNS	6	(Germany) Stefan Bradl	LCR Honda MotoGP	Honda		Injured		

- Marc Márquez and Bryan Staring were both black-flagged for pitting to change to their second bikes outside of the designated window.

=== Moto2 ===
Pos	No	Rider	Manufacturer	Laps	Time/Retired	Grid	Points
1	40	(Spain) Pol Espargaró	Kalex	13	20:19.219	1	25
2	12	(Switzerland) Thomas Lüthi	Suter	13	+0.591	5	20
3	81	(Spain) Jordi Torres	Suter	13	+0.679	3	16
4	3	(Italy) Simone Corsi	Speed Up	13	+0.893	13	13
5	15	(San Marino) Alex de Angelis	Speed Up	13	+1.111	4	11
6	77	(Switzerland) Dominique Aegerter	Suter	13	+3.073	12	10
7	36	(Finland) Mika Kallio	Kalex	13	+3.234	6	9
8	80	(Spain) Esteve Rabat	Kalex	13	+3.655	2	8
9	18	(Spain) Nicolás Terol	Suter	13	+10.182	8	7
10	95	(Australia) Anthony West	Speed Up	13	+18.083	19	6
11	11	(Germany) Sandro Cortese	Kalex	13	+18.317	7	5
12	88	(Spain) Ricard Cardús	Speed Up	13	+19.415	20	4
13	52	(United Kingdom) Danny Kent	Tech 3	13	+32.194	21	3
14	8	(United Kingdom) Gino Rea	Speed Up	13	+32.835	22	2
15	7	(Indonesia) Doni Tata Pradita	Suter	13	+35.588	24	1
16	54	(Italy) Mattia Pasini	Speed Up	13	+36.183	9	
17	31	(Japan) Kohta Nozane	Motobi	13	+36.542	27	
18	44	(South Africa) Steven Odendaal	Speed Up	13	+36.913	26	
19	25	(Malaysia) Azlan Shah	Moriwaki	13	+37.099	28	
20	97	(Indonesia) Rafid Topan Sucipto	Speed Up	13	+37.426	23	
21	23	(Germany) Marcel Schrötter	Kalex	13	+41.817	17	
22	30	(Japan) Takaaki Nakagami	Kalex	13	+41.933	14	
23	34	(Argentina) Ezequiel Iturrioz	Kalex	13	+47.089	29	
24	49	(Spain) Axel Pons	Kalex	13	+1:30.731	16	
Ret	92	(Spain) Álex Mariñelarena	Kalex	7	Accident	25	
Ret	96	(France) Louis Rossi	Tech 3	5	Accident	18	
Ret	19	(Belgium) Xavier Siméon	Kalex	4	Accident	10	
Ret	5	(France) Johann Zarco	Suter	3	Accident	11	
Ret	60	(Spain) Julián Simón	Kalex	2	Retired	15	
DNS	45	(United Kingdom) Scott Redding	Kalex		Injured		
DNS	10	(Thailand) Thitipong Warokorn	Suter		Injured		
OFFICIAL MOTO2 REPORT

=== Moto3 ===
Pos	No	Rider	Manufacturer	Laps	Time/Retired	Grid	Points
1	42	(Spain) Álex Rins	KTM	23	37:40.375	5	25
2	25	(Spain) Maverick Viñales	KTM	23	+0.003	4	20
3	39	(Spain) Luis Salom	KTM	23	+0.178	1	16
4	12	(Spain) Álex Márquez	KTM	23	+0.502	13	13
5	8	(Australia) Jack Miller	FTR Honda	23	+0.601	10	11
6	94	(Germany) Jonas Folger	Kalex KTM	23	+1.077	2	10
7	7	(Spain) Efrén Vázquez	Mahindra	23	+1.104	3	9
8	23	(Italy) Niccolò Antonelli	FTR Honda	23	+2.267	12	8
9	31	(Finland) Niklas Ajo	KTM	23	+15.074	21	7
10	10	(France) Alexis Masbou	FTR Honda	23	+15.960	11	6
11	63	(Malaysia) Zulfahmi Khairuddin	KTM	23	+15.974	9	5
12	84	(Czech Republic) Jakub Kornfeil	Kalex KTM	23	+16.105	14	4
13	32	(Spain) Isaac Viñales	FTR Honda	23	+16.311	6	3
14	5	(Italy) Romano Fenati	FTR Honda	23	+16.532	17	2
15	41	(South Africa) Brad Binder	Mahindra	23	+16.629	15	1
16	61	(Australia) Arthur Sissis	KTM	23	+16.665	16	
17	17	(United Kingdom) John McPhee	FTR Honda	23	+16.898	19	
18	11	(Belgium) Livio Loi	Kalex KTM	23	+17.353	23	
19	22	(Spain) Ana Carrasco	KTM	23	+19.042	7	
20	53	(Netherlands) Jasper Iwema	Kalex KTM	23	+36.382	24	
21	57	(Brazil) Eric Granado	Kalex KTM	23	+43.184	25	
22	43	(Germany) Luca Grünwald	Kalex KTM	23	+43.193	26	
23	9	(Germany) Toni Finsterbusch	Kalex KTM	23	+43.210	28	
24	77	(Italy) Lorenzo Baldassarri	FTR Honda	23	+43.350	27	
25	89	(France) Alan Techer	TSR Honda	23	+43.357	18	
26	44	(Portugal) Miguel Oliveira	Mahindra	23	+44.482	8	
27	58	(Spain) Juan Francisco Guevara	TSR Honda	23	+59.576	30	
28	21	(Germany) Luca Amato	Mahindra	23	+1:08.240	29	
29	80	(Malaysia) Hafiq Azmi	FTR Honda	23	+1:33.737	32	
30	75	(Australia) Lachlan Kavney	Bullet	22	+1 lap	33	
Ret	29	(Japan) Hyuga Watanabe	FTR Honda	10	Accident	31	
Ret	4	(Italy) Francesco Bagnaia	FTR Honda	7	Retired	22	
DNS	65	(Germany) Philipp Öttl	Kalex KTM		Did not start	20	
DNS	3	(Italy) Matteo Ferrari	FTR Honda		Injured		
DNQ	47	(Australia) Callum Barker	Honda		Did not qualify		
OFFICIAL MOTO3 REPORT

== Championship standings after the race (MotoGP) ==
Below are the standings for the top five riders and constructors after round sixteen has concluded.

Riders' Championship standings

Pos.	Rider	Points
1	(Spain) Marc Márquez	298
2	(Spain) Jorge Lorenzo	280
3	(Spain) Dani Pedrosa	264
4	(Italy) Valentino Rossi	214
5	(United Kingdom) Cal Crutchlow	179

Constructors' Championship standings

Pos.	Constructor	Points
1	(Japan) Honda	349
2	(Japan) Yamaha	331
3	(Italy) Ducati	140
4	(Italy) ART	91
5	(United Kingdom) FTR	42

Notes:

- Only the top five positions are included for both sets of standings.
- ^{1} All points from the race victory for Marc Márquez were deducted as a result of a decision from Race Direction, after Márquez collided with teammate Dani Pedrosa during the race. Honda's next-best finisher was Álvaro Bautista, who scored a fourth-place finish.

Previous race: 2013 Malaysian Grand Prix	FIM Grand Prix World Championship; 2013 season	Next race: 2013 Japanese Grand Prix
Previous race: 2012 Australian Grand Prix	Australian motorcycle Grand Prix	Next race: 2014 Australian Grand Prix
