= 2013 Spanish motorcycle Grand Prix =

(Spain) 2013 Spanish Grand Prix
Race details
- Race 3 of 18 races in the 2013 Grand Prix motorcycle racing season
- Date: 5 May 2013
- Official name: Gran Premio bwin de España
- Location: Circuito de Jerez
- Course: Permanent racing facility; 4.423 km (2.748 mi)

MotoGP
Pole position
Rider	(Spain) Jorge Lorenzo	Yamaha
Time	1:38.673	
Fastest lap
Rider	(Spain) Jorge Lorenzo	Yamaha
Time	1:39.565 on lap 2	
Podium
First	(Spain) Dani Pedrosa	Honda
Second	(Spain) Marc Márquez	Honda
Third	(Spain) Jorge Lorenzo	Yamaha

Moto2
Pole position
Rider	(Spain) Esteve Rabat	Kalex
Time	1:43.251	
Fastest lap
Rider	(Spain) Esteve Rabat	Kalex
Time	1:43.119 on lap 7	
Podium
First	(Spain) Esteve Rabat	Kalex
Second	(United Kingdom) Scott Redding	Kalex
Third	(Spain) Pol Espargaró	Kalex

Moto3
Pole position
Rider	(Spain) Álex Rins	KTM
Time	1:46.660	
Fastest lap
Rider	(Spain) Luis Salom	KTM
Time	1:46.948 on lap 2	
Podium
First	(Spain) Maverick Viñales	KTM
Second	(Spain) Luis Salom	KTM
Third	(Germany) Jonas Folger	KTM

The 2013 Spanish motorcycle Grand Prix was the third round of the 2013 MotoGP season. It was held at the Circuito de Jerez in Jerez de la Frontera on 5 May 2013.

== Classification ==
=== MotoGP ===
Pos.	No.	Rider	Team	Manufacturer	Laps	Time	Grid	Points
1	26	(Spain) Dani Pedrosa	Repsol Honda Team	Honda	27	45:17.632	2	25
2	93	(Spain) Marc Márquez	Repsol Honda Team	Honda	27	+2.487	3	20
3	99	(Spain) Jorge Lorenzo	Yamaha Factory Racing	Yamaha	27	+5.089	1	16
4	46	(Italy) Valentino Rossi	Yamaha Factory Racing	Yamaha	27	+8.914	5	13
5	35	(United Kingdom) Cal Crutchlow	Monster Yamaha Tech 3	Yamaha	27	+12.663	4	11
6	19	(Spain) Álvaro Bautista	Go&Fun Honda Gresini	Honda	27	+15.094	6	10
7	69	(United States) Nicky Hayden	Ducati Team	Ducati	27	+25.632	7	9
8	4	(Italy) Andrea Dovizioso	Ducati Team	Ducati	27	+41.881	9	8
9	41	(Spain) Aleix Espargaró	Power Electronics Aspar	ART	27	+43.812	13	7
10	38	(United Kingdom) Bradley Smith	Monster Yamaha Tech 3	Yamaha	27	+44.461	12	6
11	51	(Italy) Michele Pirro	Ducati Test Team	Ducati	27	+45.974	14	5
12	8	(Spain) Héctor Barberá	Avintia Blusens	FTR	27	+59.859	10	4
13	70	(United Kingdom) Michael Laverty	Paul Bird Motorsport	PBM	27	+1:09.743	22	3
14	9	(Italy) Danilo Petrucci	Came IodaRacing Project	Ioda-Suter	27	+1:17.813	17	2
15	5	(United States) Colin Edwards	NGM Mobile Forward Racing	FTR Kawasaki	27	+1:18.177	20	1
16	67	(Australia) Bryan Staring	Go&Fun Honda Gresini	FTR Honda	27	+1:18.928	18	
17	71	(Italy) Claudio Corti	NGM Mobile Forward Racing	FTR Kawasaki	27	+1:19.307	19	
18	7	(Japan) Hiroshi Aoyama	Avintia Blusens	FTR	27	+1:19.457	16	
Ret	6	(Germany) Stefan Bradl	LCR Honda MotoGP	Honda	3	Accident	8	
Ret	29	(Italy) Andrea Iannone	Energy T.I. Pramac Racing	Ducati	3	Accident	11	
Ret	52	(Czech Republic) Lukáš Pešek	Came IodaRacing Project	Ioda-Suter	3	Accident	23	
Ret	14	(France) Randy de Puniet	Power Electronics Aspar	ART	2	Accident	15	
Ret	68	(Colombia) Yonny Hernández	Paul Bird Motorsport	ART	2	Accident	21	
DNS	17	(Czech Republic) Karel Abraham	Cardion AB Motoracing	ART		Did not start		

=== Moto2 ===
Pos	No	Rider	Manufacturer	Laps	Time	Grid	Points
1	80	(Spain) Esteve Rabat	Kalex	26	45:04.450	1	25
2	45	(United Kingdom) Scott Redding	Kalex	26	+4.261	2	20
3	40	(Spain) Pol Espargaró	Kalex	26	+7.517	4	16
4	30	(Japan) Takaaki Nakagami	Kalex	26	+7.721	3	13
5	18	(Spain) Nicolás Terol	Suter	26	+11.535	7	11
6	19	(Belgium) Xavier Siméon	Kalex	26	+13.264	6	10
7	81	(Spain) Jordi Torres	Suter	26	+13.762	5	9
8	77	(Switzerland) Dominique Aegerter	Suter	26	+21.105	13	8
9	24	(Spain) Toni Elías	Kalex	26	+24.221	12	7
10	23	(Germany) Marcel Schrötter	Kalex	26	+24.419	8	6
11	12	(Switzerland) Thomas Lüthi	Suter	26	+26.526	9	5
12	5	(France) Johann Zarco	Suter	26	+35.559	30	4
13	3	(Italy) Simone Corsi	Speed Up	26	+35.656	11	3
14	15	(San Marino) Alex de Angelis	Speed Up	26	+35.833	22	2
15	54	(Italy) Mattia Pasini	Speed Up	26	+44.877	20	1
16	60	(Spain) Julián Simón	Kalex	26	+44.944	14	
17	4	(Switzerland) Randy Krummenacher	Suter	26	+50.024	18	
18	11	(Germany) Sandro Cortese	Kalex	26	+50.327	19	
19	63	(France) Mike Di Meglio	Motobi	26	+51.861	17	
20	88	(Spain) Ricard Cardús	Speed Up	26	+52.312	28	
21	44	(South Africa) Steven Odendaal	Speed Up	26	+52.405	29	
22	72	(Japan) Yuki Takahashi	Moriwaki	26	+1:03.376	21	
23	17	(Spain) Alberto Moncayo	Speed Up	26	+1:08.546	33	
24	96	(France) Louis Rossi	Tech 3	26	+1:10.022	32	
25	7	(Indonesia) Doni Tata Pradita	Suter	26	+1:19.177	31	
26	52	(United Kingdom) Danny Kent	Tech 3	26	+1:36.027	24	
27	97	(Indonesia) Rafid Topan Sucipto	Speed Up	25	+1 lap	34	
DSQ	95	(Australia) Anthony West	Speed Up	26	(+27.005)	10	
Ret	36	(Finland) Mika Kallio	Kalex	15	Retirement	15	
Ret	9	(United Kingdom) Kyle Smith	Kalex	11	Accident	25	
Ret	27	(Spain) Dani Rivas	Kalex	9	Retirement	26	
Ret	14	(Thailand) Ratthapark Wilairot	Suter	1	Accident	16	
Ret	49	(Spain) Axel Pons	Kalex	1	Retirement	23	
Ret	92	(Spain) Álex Mariñelarena	Suter	0	Accident	27	
OFFICIAL MOTO2 REPORT

=== Moto3 ===
The race was red-flagged due to an accident involving Alan Techer. The final results were taken at the end of the 15th of the scheduled 23 laps and full points were awarded.

Pos	No	Rider	Manufacturer	Laps	Time/Retired	Grid	Points
1	25	(Spain) Maverick Viñales	KTM	15	26:57.338	2	25
2	39	(Spain) Luis Salom	KTM	15	+0.263	3	20
3	94	(Germany) Jonas Folger	Kalex KTM	15	+4.475	7	16
4	41	(South Africa) Brad Binder	Suter Honda	15	+15.104	4	13
5	84	(Czech Republic) Jakub Kornfeil	Kalex KTM	15	+18.412	9	11
6	31	(Finland) Niklas Ajo	KTM	15	+19.064	8	10
7	63	(Malaysia) Zulfahmi Khairuddin	KTM	15	+19.204	11	9
8	7	(Spain) Efrén Vázquez	Mahindra	15	+19.680	10	8
9	5	(Italy) Romano Fenati	FTR Honda	15	+22.763	18	7
10	10	(France) Alexis Masbou	FTR Honda	15	+23.138	13	6
11	17	(United Kingdom) John McPhee	FTR Honda	15	+23.189	17	5
12	61	(Australia) Arthur Sissis	KTM	15	+23.796	14	4
13	99	(United Kingdom) Danny Webb	Suter Honda	15	+27.897	12	3
14	53	(Netherlands) Jasper Iwema	Kalex KTM	15	+29.586	19	2
15	11	(Belgium) Livio Loi	Kalex KTM	15	+29.776	21	1
16	44	(Portugal) Miguel Oliveira	Mahindra	15	+33.158	15	
17	32	(Spain) Isaac Viñales	FTR Honda	15	+33.425	16	
18	19	(Italy) Alessandro Tonucci	Honda	15	+33.660	27	
19	57	(Brazil) Eric Granado	Kalex KTM	15	+35.004	20	
20	65	(Germany) Philipp Öttl	Kalex KTM	15	+40.403	30	
21	3	(Italy) Matteo Ferrari	FTR Honda	15	+44.533	32	
22	77	(Italy) Lorenzo Baldassarri	FTR Honda	15	+44.657	34	
23	12	(Spain) Álex Márquez	KTM	15	+50.055	22	
24	29	(Japan) Hyuga Watanabe	Honda	15	+1:02.153	33	
25	86	(Germany) Kevin Hanus	Honda	15	+1:22.197	35	
26	4	(Italy) Francesco Bagnaia	FTR Honda	14	+1 lap	23	
NC	89	(France) Alan Techer	TSR Honda	15	+39.645	31	
Ret	66	(Germany) Florian Alt	Kalex KTM	13	Collision	26	
Ret	22	(Spain) Ana Carrasco	KTM	13	Collision	24	
Ret	8	(Australia) Jack Miller	FTR Honda	11	Accident	5	
Ret	23	(Italy) Niccolò Antonelli	FTR Honda	11	Accident	6	
Ret	42	(Spain) Álex Rins	KTM	10	Accident	1	
Ret	9	(Germany) Toni Finsterbusch	Kalex KTM	9	Retirement	28	
Ret	58	(Spain) Juan Francisco Guevara	TSR Honda	7	Retirement	29	
Ret	49	(Spain) Jorge Navarro	MIR Racing	5	Accident	25	
OFFICIAL MOTO3 REPORT

== Championship standings after the race (MotoGP) ==
Below are the standings for the top five riders and constructors after round three has concluded.

Riders' Championship standings

Pos.	Rider	Points
1	(Spain) Marc Márquez	61
2	(Spain) Dani Pedrosa	58
3	(Spain) Jorge Lorenzo	57
4	(Italy) Valentino Rossi	43
5	(United Kingdom) Cal Crutchlow	35

Constructors' Championship standings

Pos.	Constructor	Points
1	(Japan) Honda	66
2	(Japan) Yamaha	57
3	(Italy) Ducati	27
4	(Italy) ART	17
5	(United Kingdom) FTR	7

- Note: Only the top five positions are included for both sets of standings.

Previous race: 2013 Grand Prix of the Americas	FIM Grand Prix World Championship; 2013 season	Next race: 2013 French Grand Prix
Previous race: 2012 Spanish Grand Prix	Spanish motorcycle Grand Prix	Next race: 2014 Spanish Grand Prix
