= 2013 San Marino and Rimini Riviera motorcycle Grand Prix =

2013 San Marino and Rimini Riviera Grand Prix
Race details
- Race 13 of 18 races in the 2013 Grand Prix motorcycle racing season
- Date: 15 September 2013
- Official name: Gran Premio Aperol di San Marino e della Riviera di Rimini
- Location: Misano World Circuit Marco Simoncelli
- Course: Permanent racing facility; 4.226 km (2.626 mi)

MotoGP
Pole position
Rider	(Spain) Marc Márquez	Honda
Time	1:32.915	
Fastest lap
Rider	(Spain) Marc Márquez	Honda
Time	1:33.935 on lap 11	
Podium
First	(Spain) Jorge Lorenzo	Yamaha
Second	(Spain) Marc Márquez	Honda
Third	(Spain) Dani Pedrosa	Honda

Moto2
Pole position
Rider	(Spain) Pol Espargaró	Kalex
Time	1:37.666	
Fastest lap
Rider	(Spain) Pol Espargaró	Kalex
Time	1:38.070 on lap 22	
Podium
First	(Spain) Pol Espargaró	Kalex
Second	(Japan) Takaaki Nakagami	Kalex
Third	(Spain) Esteve Rabat	Kalex

Moto3
Pole position
Rider	(Germany) Jonas Folger	Kalex KTM
Time	1:42.707	
Fastest lap
Rider	(Spain) Álex Márquez	KTM
Time	1:43.293 on lap 4	
Podium
First	(Spain) Álex Rins	KTM
Second	(Spain) Maverick Viñales	KTM
Third	(Spain) Álex Márquez	KTM

The 2013 San Marino and Rimini Riviera motorcycle Grand Prix was the thirteenth round of the 2013 MotoGP season. It was held at the Misano World Circuit Marco Simoncelli in Misano Adriatico on 15 September 2013.

== Classification ==
=== MotoGP ===
Pos.	No.	Rider	Team	Manufacturer	Laps	Time/Retired	Grid	Points
1	99	(Spain) Jorge Lorenzo	Yamaha Factory Racing	Yamaha	28	44:05.522	2	25
2	93	(Spain) Marc Márquez	Repsol Honda Team	Honda	28	+3.379	1	20
3	26	(Spain) Dani Pedrosa	Repsol Honda Team	Honda	28	+7.368	4	16
4	46	(Italy) Valentino Rossi	Yamaha Factory Racing	Yamaha	28	+15.062	3	13
5	6	(Germany) Stefan Bradl	LCR Honda MotoGP	Honda	28	+22.355	7	11
6	35	(United Kingdom) Cal Crutchlow	Monster Yamaha Tech 3	Yamaha	28	+22.599	5	10
7	19	(Spain) Álvaro Bautista	Go&Fun Honda Gresini	Honda	28	+31.059	8	9
8	4	(Italy) Andrea Dovizioso	Ducati Team	Ducati	28	+42.702	9	8
9	69	(United States) Nicky Hayden	Ducati Team	Ducati	28	+44.858	10	7
10	51	(Italy) Michele Pirro	Ignite Pramac Racing	Ducati	28	+47.818	11	6
11	38	(United Kingdom) Bradley Smith	Monster Yamaha Tech 3	Yamaha	28	+48.011	13	5
12	5	(United States) Colin Edwards	NGM Mobile Forward Racing	FTR Kawasaki	28	+1:03.154	14	4
13	41	(Spain) Aleix Espargaró	Power Electronics Aspar	ART	28	+1:07.600	6	3
14	7	(Japan) Hiroshi Aoyama	Avintia Blusens	FTR	28	+1:15.528	15	2
15	9	(Italy) Danilo Petrucci	Came IodaRacing Project	Ioda-Suter	28	+1:17.907	19	1
16	71	(Italy) Claudio Corti	NGM Mobile Forward Racing	FTR Kawasaki	28	+1:29.655	18	
17	14	(France) Randy de Puniet	Power Electronics Aspar	ART	28	+1:33.990	16	
18	70	(United Kingdom) Michael Laverty	Paul Bird Motorsport	PBM	28	+1:36.860	20	
Ret	67	(Australia) Bryan Staring	Go&Fun Honda Gresini	FTR Honda	24	Retirement	23	
Ret	8	(Spain) Héctor Barberá	Avintia Blusens	FTR	21	Retirement	17	
Ret	68	(Colombia) Yonny Hernández	Paul Bird Motorsport	ART	9	Retirement	21	
Ret	17	(Czech Republic) Karel Abraham	Cardion AB Motoracing	ART	7	Retirement	22	
Ret	29	(Italy) Andrea Iannone	Energy T.I. Pramac Racing	Ducati	3	Accident	12	
Ret	52	(Czech Republic) Lukáš Pešek	Came IodaRacing Project	Ioda-Suter	3	Retirement	24	

=== Moto2 ===
Pos.	No.	Rider	Manufacturer	Laps	Time/Retired	Grid	Points
1	40	(Spain) Pol Espargaró	Kalex	26	42:47.098	1	25
2	30	(Japan) Takaaki Nakagami	Kalex	26	+0.621	3	20
3	80	(Spain) Esteve Rabat	Kalex	26	+1.815	2	16
4	12	(Switzerland) Thomas Lüthi	Suter	26	+12.919	4	13
5	77	(Switzerland) Dominique Aegerter	Suter	26	+14.925	10	11
6	45	(United Kingdom) Scott Redding	Kalex	26	+15.123	5	10
7	5	(France) Johann Zarco	Suter	26	+15.259	7	9
8	19	(Belgium) Xavier Siméon	Kalex	26	+20.369	6	8
9	36	(Finland) Mika Kallio	Kalex	26	+20.615	15	7
10	18	(Spain) Nicolás Terol	Suter	26	+24.635	12	6
11	54	(Italy) Mattia Pasini	Speed Up	26	+29.173	11	5
12	60	(Spain) Julián Simón	Kalex	26	+29.418	8	4
13	23	(Germany) Marcel Schrötter	Kalex	26	+29.458	9	3
14	15	(San Marino) Alex de Angelis	Speed Up	26	+37.718	21	2
15	81	(Spain) Jordi Torres	Suter	26	+39.314	24	1
16	4	(Switzerland) Randy Krummenacher	Suter	26	+42.796	18	
17	49	(Spain) Axel Pons	Kalex	26	+42.938	23	
18	52	(United Kingdom) Danny Kent	Tech 3	26	+48.222	13	
19	96	(France) Louis Rossi	Tech 3	26	+51.304	22	
20	94	(Italy) Franco Morbidelli	Suter	26	+51.561	25	
21	8	(United Kingdom) Gino Rea	FTR	26	+1:00.821	20	
22	44	(South Africa) Steven Odendaal	Speed Up	26	+1:13.014	30	
23	25	(Malaysia) Azlan Shah	Moriwaki	26	+1:13.968	32	
24	34	(Argentina) Ezequiel Iturrioz	Kalex	26	+1:36.626	31	
25	97	(Indonesia) Rafid Topan Sucipto	Speed Up	25	+1 lap	33	
26	10	(Thailand) Thitipong Warokorn	Suter	25	+1 lap	29	
DSQ	95	(Australia) Anthony West	Speed Up	26	(+28.649)	19	
Ret	88	(Spain) Ricard Cardús	Speed Up	24	Accident	27	
Ret	22	(Australia) Jason O'Halloran	Motobi	16	Accident	26	
Ret	3	(Italy) Simone Corsi	Speed Up	10	Retirement	14	
Ret	11	(Germany) Sandro Cortese	Kalex	9	Accident	17	
Ret	92	(Spain) Álex Mariñelarena	Kalex	2	Accident	16	
Ret	17	(Spain) Alberto Moncayo	Speed Up	1	Accident	28	
OFFICIAL MOTO2 REPORT

=== Moto3 ===
Pos.	No.	Rider	Manufacturer	Laps	Time/Retired	Grid	Points
1	42	(Spain) Álex Rins	KTM	23	39:50.516	2	25
2	25	(Spain) Maverick Viñales	KTM	23	+0.050	3	20
3	12	(Spain) Álex Márquez	KTM	23	+6.434	9	16
4	39	(Spain) Luis Salom	KTM	23	+17.297	10	13
5	8	(Australia) Jack Miller	FTR Honda	23	+18.011	11	11
6	63	(Malaysia) Zulfahmi Khairuddin	KTM	23	+18.133	4	10
7	44	(Portugal) Miguel Oliveira	Mahindra	23	+18.456	6	9
8	23	(Italy) Niccolò Antonelli	FTR Honda	23	+18.604	5	8
9	65	(Germany) Philipp Öttl	Kalex KTM	23	+24.892	13	7
10	5	(Italy) Romano Fenati	FTR Honda	23	+25.113	15	6
11	31	(Finland) Niklas Ajo	KTM	23	+27.619	21	5
12	7	(Spain) Efrén Vázquez	Mahindra	23	+27.634	14	4
13	84	(Czech Republic) Jakub Kornfeil	Kalex KTM	23	+27.683	16	3
14	32	(Spain) Isaac Viñales	FTR Honda	23	+27.834	8	2
15	61	(Australia) Arthur Sissis	KTM	23	+27.899	18	1
16	19	(Italy) Alessandro Tonucci	FTR Honda	23	+36.083	20	
17	89	(France) Alan Techer	TSR Honda	23	+36.114	19	
18	41	(South Africa) Brad Binder	Mahindra	23	+36.506	24	
19	22	(Spain) Ana Carrasco	KTM	23	+46.502	28	
20	17	(United Kingdom) John McPhee	FTR Honda	23	+50.025	17	
21	53	(Netherlands) Jasper Iwema	Kalex KTM	23	+50.606	33	
22	11	(Belgium) Livio Loi	Kalex KTM	23	+50.881	23	
23	77	(Italy) Lorenzo Baldassarri	FTR Honda	23	+51.047	27	
24	21	(Germany) Luca Amato	Mahindra	23	+51.505	35	
25	55	(Italy) Andrea Locatelli	Mahindra	23	+1:18.168	26	
26	9	(Germany) Toni Finsterbusch	Kalex KTM	23	+1:18.185	22	
27	58	(Spain) Juan Francisco Guevara	TSR Honda	23	+1:28.093	30	
28	29	(Japan) Hyuga Watanabe	FTR Honda	22	+1 lap	32	
Ret	57	(Brazil) Eric Granado	Kalex KTM	22	Accident	7	
Ret	66	(Germany) Florian Alt	Kalex KTM	16	Retirement	34	
Ret	10	(France) Alexis Masbou	FTR Honda	14	Retirement	12	
Ret	3	(Italy) Matteo Ferrari	FTR Honda	12	Accident	25	
Ret	4	(Italy) Francesco Bagnaia	FTR Honda	8	Accident	31	
Ret	94	(Germany) Jonas Folger	Kalex KTM	3	Accident	1	
Ret	97	(Italy) Luca Marini	FTR Honda	0	Accident	29	
OFFICIAL MOTO3 REPORT

== Championship standings after the race (MotoGP) ==
Below are the standings for the top five riders and constructors after round thirteen has concluded.

Riders' Championship standings

Pos.	Rider	Points
1	(Spain) Marc Márquez	253
2	(Spain) Jorge Lorenzo	219
3	(Spain) Dani Pedrosa	219
4	(Italy) Valentino Rossi	169
5	(United Kingdom) Cal Crutchlow	146

Constructors' Championship standings

Pos.	Constructor	Points
1	(Japan) Honda	291
2	(Japan) Yamaha	270
3	(Italy) Ducati	115
4	(Italy) ART	73
5	(United Kingdom) FTR	33

- Note: Only the top five positions are included for both sets of standings.

Previous race: 2013 British Grand Prix	FIM Grand Prix World Championship; 2013 season	Next race: 2013 Aragon Grand Prix
Previous race: 2012 San Marino Grand Prix	San Marino and Rimini Riviera motorcycle Grand Prix	Next race: 2014 San Marino Grand Prix
