= Iván Silva (motorcyclist) =

Spanish motorcycle racer (born 1982)

Iván Silva Alberola
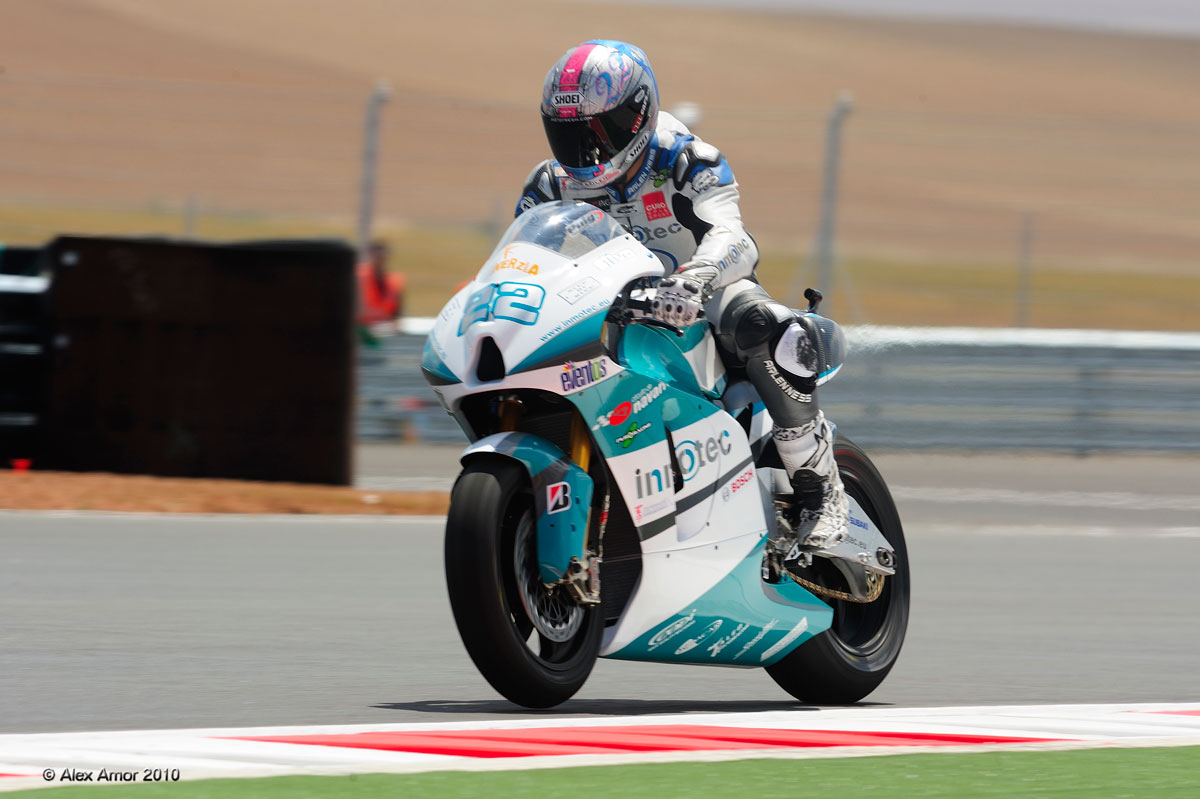
- Silva at Circuito de Navarra
- Nationality: Spanish
- Born: 12 June 1982 (age 44); Barcelona, Spain
- Current team: SUZUKI JEG Racing
- Bike number: 22
- Website: silva22.es
Motorcycle racing career statistics
MotoGP World Championship
Active years	2006–2007, 2012–2013
Manufacturers	Ducati (2006–2007); BQR-FTR (2012); BQR (2012); FTR (2013)
2013 championship position	NC (0 pts)
Starts / Wins / Podiums / Poles / F. laps / Points; 21 / 0 / 0 / 0 / 0 / 12
250cc World Championship
Active years	1998–1999, 2001, 2004
Manufacturers	Honda (1998–1999, 2001), Aprilia (2004)
2007 championship position	NC (0 pts)
Starts / Wins / Podiums / Poles / F. laps / Points; 4 / 0 / 0 / 0 / 0 / 0
Superbike World Championship
Active years	2005, 2008
Manufacturers	Yamaha (2005), Honda (2008)
2008 championship position	NC (0 pts)
Starts / Wins / Podiums / Poles / F. laps / Points; 7 / 0 / 0 / 0 / 0 / 10

Iván Silva Alberola (born 12 June 1982 in Barcelona) is a Spanish Grand Prix motorcycle road racer. He races in the RFME Superstock 1000 Championship aboard a Suzuki GSX-R1000.

== Career ==
Silva has made occasional substitute racing appearances in MotoGP. After appearing in 2005 he filled in for D'Antin at Donington Park and Brno in 2006, as their regular rider Alex Hofmann was filling in for Sete Gibernau on a works Ducati. Despite targeting a full-time ride for 2007, he remained in a testing role, but again raced for the team at Brno, this time replacing an injured Hofmann. He noted that "I am happy to have the possibility to run in MotoGP again, especially this year where we have at our disposal the best tyres and bike of the moment", although his performance disguised this fact – he finished last in every practice session and in qualifying, despite Casey Stoner taking pole on identical equipment. He also entered the 2005 Superbike World Championship round in Qatar for the LaGlisse team, taking seventh place in the one race his bike finished.

== Career statistics ==
=== Career highlights ===
- 1995: 1st, Spanish Criterium Solo Moto 75cc / 1st, Catalan Criterium Solo Moto 75cc
- 2011: 1st, CEV Stock Extreme Championship / 1st, European Superstock 1000 Championship

=== Grand Prix motorcycle racing ===
==== By season ====
Season	Class	Motorcycle	Team	Number	Race	Win	Podium	Pole	FLap	Pts	Plcd
1998	250cc	Honda	Team Chupa Chups	93	1	0	0	0	0	0	NC
1999	250cc	Honda	Motorola	70	1	0	0	0	0	0	NC
2001	250cc	Honda	By Queroseno Racing Team	26	1	0	0	0	0	0	NC
2004	250cc	Aprilia	Grefusa Aspar Team 250cc	22	1	0	0	0	0	0	NC
2006	MotoGP	Ducati	Pramac d'Antin MotoGP	22	3	0	0	0	0	0	NC
2007	MotoGP	Ducati	Pramac d'Antin	22	1	0	0	0	0	0	NC
2012	MotoGP	BQR-FTR	Avintia Blusens	22	16	0	0	0	0	12	23rd
2012	MotoGP	BQR	Avintia Blusens	22	16	0	0	0	0	12	23rd
2013	MotoGP	FTR	Avintia Blusens	22	1	0	0	0	0	0	NC
Total					**25**	**0**	**0**	**0**	**0**	**12**	

=== By class ===
Class	Seasons	1st GP	1st Pod	1st Win	Race	Win	Podiums	Pole	FLap	Pts	WChmp
250cc	1998–1999, 2001, 2004	1998 Catalunya			4	0	0	0	0	0	0
MotoGP	2006–2007, 2012–	2006 Netherlands			21	0	0	0	0	12	0

==== Races by year ====
(key)

Year	Class	Bike	1	2	3	4	5	6	7	8	9	10	11	12	13	14	15	16	17	18	Pos.	Pts
1998	250cc	Honda	JPN	MAL	ESP	ITA	FRA	MAD	NED	GBR	GER	CZE	IMO	CAT; Ret	AUS	ARG					NC	0
1999	250cc	Honda	MAL	JPN	ESP	FRA	ITA	CAT; Ret	NED	GBR	GER	CZE	IMO	VAL	AUS	RSA	BRA	ARG			NC	0
2001	250cc	Honda	JPN	RSA; DSQ	SPA	FRA	ITA	CAT	NED	GBR	GER	CZE	POR	VAL	PAC	AUS	MAL	BRA			NC	0
2004	250cc	Aprilia	RSA	SPA	FRA	ITA	CAT	NED; 22	BRA	GER	GBR	CZE	POR	JPN	QAT	MAL	AUS	VAL			NC	0
2006	MotoGP	Ducati	SPA	QAT	TUR	CHN	FRA	ITA	CAT	NED; 16	GBR; Ret	GER	USA	CZE; 18	MAL	AUS	JPN	POR	VAL		NC	0
2007	MotoGP	Ducati	QAT	SPA	TUR	CHN	FRA	ITA	CAT	GBR	NED	GER	USA	CZE; 16	RSM	POR	JPN	AUS	MAL	VAL	NC	0
2012	MotoGP	BQR-FTR	QAT; 16																		23rd	12
2012	MotoGP	BQR		SPA; 15	POR; Ret	FRA; 18	CAT; 20	GBR; 18	NED; 12	GER; 18	ITA; 16	USA; 14	INP; 12	CZE; Ret	RSM	ARA	JPN; Ret	MAL; Ret	AUS; 15	VAL; Ret	23rd	12
2013	MotoGP	FTR	QAT	AME	SPA	FRA	ITA	CAT	NED; 23	GER	USA	INP	CZE	GBR	RSM	ARA	MAL	AUS	JPN	VAL	NC	0

=== Superstock European Championship ===
==== Races by year ====
(key) (Races in bold indicate pole position) (Races in italics indicate fastest lap)

Year	Bike	1	2	3	4	5	6	7	8	9	Pos	Pts
2004	Yamaha	VAL; 4	SMR	MNZ	OSC	SIL	BRA	NED	IMO	MAG	20th	13

=== FIM Superstock 1000 Cup ===
==== Races by year ====
(key) (Races in bold indicate pole position) (Races in italics indicate fastest lap)

Year	Bike	1	2	3	4	5	6	7	8	9	10	Pos	Pts
2006	Kawasaki	VAL; 2	MNZ	SIL	SMR	BRN; 9	BRA	NED	LAU	IMO	MAG	16th	27

=== Supersport World Championship ===
==== Races by year ====
Year	Bike	1	2	3	4	5	6	7	8	9	10	11	12	13	Pos.	Pts
2004	Honda	SPA	AUS	SMR	ITA	GER	GBR	GBR	NED; Ret	ITA	FRA; Ret				NC	0
2008	Yamaha	QAT	AUS	SPA	NED	ITA	GER	SMR	CZE	GBR	EUR	ITA	FRA	POR; 18	NC	0

=== Superbike World Championship ===
==== Races by year ====
(key) (Races in bold indicate pole position) (Races in italics indicate fastest lap)

Year	Make	1		2		3		4		5		6		7		8		9		10		11		12		13		14		Pos.	Pts
Year	Make	R1	R2	R1	R2	R1	R2	R1	R2	R1	R2	R1	R2	R1	R2	R1	R2	R1	R2	R1	R2	R1	R2	R1	R2	R1	R2	R1	R2	Pos.	Pts
2005	Yamaha	QAT; 7	QAT; Ret	AUS	AUS	SPA; 15	SPA; Ret	ITA	ITA	EUR	EUR	SMR	SMR	CZE	CZE	GBR	GBR	NED	NED	GER	GER	ITA; Ret	ITA; C	FRA	FRA					26th	10
2008	Honda	QAT	QAT	AUS	AUS	SPA	SPA	NED	NED	ITA	ITA	USA	USA	GER	GER	SMR	SMR	CZE	CZE	GBR	GBR	EUR	EUR	ITA	ITA	FRA; 20	FRA; 21	POR	POR	NC	0

=== FIM World Endurance Championship ===
==== By team ====
Year	Team	Bike	Rider	TC
2015	Yamaha Austria Racing Team	Yamaha YZF-R1	(Australia) Broc Parkes (Germany) Max Neukirchner (Spain) Iván Silva (South Africa) Sheridan Morais	10th
2016	Yamaha Austria Racing Team	Yamaha YZF-R1	(Australia) Broc Parkes (Germany) Max Neukirchner (Spain) Iván Silva (Germany) Marvin Fritz (Japan) Kohta Nozane (Japan) Takuya Fujita (South Africa) Sheridan Morais	6th
2016–17	Yamaha Austria Racing Team	Yamaha YZF-R1	(Australia) Broc Parkes (Spain) Iván Silva (Germany) Marvin Fritz (Japan) Kohta Nozane	3rd
2017	Yamaha Austria Racing Team	Yamaha YZF-R1	(United States) Josh Hayes (Australia) Broc Parkes (Spain) Iván Silva (Japan) Kohta Nozane (South Africa) Sheridan Morais	3rd
