= 2013 Dutch TT =

(Netherlands) 2013 Dutch Grand Prix
Race details
- Race 7 of 18 races in the 2013 Grand Prix motorcycle racing season
- Date: 29 June 2013
- Official name: Iveco TT Assen
- Location: TT Circuit Assen
- Course: Permanent racing facility; 4.542 km (2.822 mi)

MotoGP
Pole position
Rider	(United Kingdom) Cal Crutchlow	Yamaha
Time	1:34.398	
Fastest lap
Rider	(Italy) Valentino Rossi	Yamaha
Time	1:34.894 on lap 5	
Podium
First	(Italy) Valentino Rossi	Yamaha
Second	(Spain) Marc Márquez	Honda
Third	(United Kingdom) Cal Crutchlow	Yamaha

Moto2
Pole position
Rider	(Spain) Pol Espargaró	Kalex
Time	1:38.734	
Fastest lap
Rider	(Spain) Pol Espargaró	Kalex
Time	1:38.898 on lap 13	
Podium
First	(Spain) Pol Espargaró	Kalex
Second	(United Kingdom) Scott Redding	Kalex
Third	(Switzerland) Dominique Aegerter	Suter

Moto3
Pole position
Rider	(Portugal) Miguel Oliveira	Mahindra
Time	1:43.588	
Fastest lap
Rider	(Portugal) Miguel Oliveira	Mahindra
Time	1:43.414 on lap 12	
Podium
First	(Spain) Luis Salom	KTM
Second	(Spain) Maverick Viñales	KTM
Third	(Spain) Álex Rins	KTM

The 2013 Dutch TT was the seventh round of the 2013 MotoGP season. It was held at the TT Circuit Assen in Assen on 29 June 2013.

== MotoGP race report ==
This race was most notable for Valentino Rossi's comeback ride to win the race and Jorge Lorenzo's excellent ride to fifth place after a heavy crash in one of the free practice sessions where he badly injured his left collarbone.

On Thursday, reigning world champion Jorge Lorenzo crashed heavily during free practice in wet conditions and fractured his left collarbone as a result. After surgery he was able to take part in the race on Saturday.

After six rounds, Dani Pedrosa narrowly leads the title hunt with 123 points. Close second is Jorge Lorenzo with 116 and further back is rookie Marc Márquez with 93 points.

On Friday, Cal Crutchlow scored his first ever pole position with a time of 1:34.398. +0.357 seconds behind is Marc Márquez in second and +0.480 seconds behind is Stefan Bradl. The second row of the grid consists out of Valentino Rossi in fourth, Dani Pedrosa in fifth and Bradley Smith in sixth place. Iván Silva replaces Hiroshi Aoyama who is still recovering from a crash in free practice on the Saturday of the Catalan round, losing a part of his finger as a result. Michele Pirro also replaces Ben Spies who is still recovering from chest pains which caused him to miss multiple races since the Americas race.

All riders take off and do their usual warm-up lap before lining up in their respective grid slots. As the lights go out, Pedrosa has the best start and manages to get up into first place entering the Haarbocht (Turn 1). Close behind him is Bradl who managed to jump Márquez and go up into second. Third is the Spaniard as he has to fight off Rossi in fourth. Crutchlow gets a bogged down start and has to settle for fifth position. Behind him is teammate Smith in sixth. At Strubben (Turn 5), Márquez goes up the inside of Bradl and takes second. Further back, Nicky Hayden gets passed by Aleix Espargaró who takes a tighter line at Ossebroeken (Turn 4) for seventh spot. Lorenzo then uses the opportunity to quickly move past the American on the outside of Strubben as well for eighth place on the opening lap. Rossi has a look up the inside of Bradl at De Bult (Turn 9) but isn't able to get past. Before De Bult, Lorenzo has already overtaken Espargaró and is now up into seventh position. At the entrance of the Geert Timmer Bocht (Turn 16), Rossi dives down the inside of Bradl and manages to take third.

On lap two, Lorenzo makes a lunge up the inside of Smith at the end of start/finish straight to pass the Briton for sixth position entering the Haarbocht. Entering Strubben, Crutchlow takes a tight line and goes side-by-side upon exit but managing to take fourth from Bradl. Espargaró also takes a shorter line at the hairpin and overtakes Smith for seventh spot. At the Veenslang (Turn 6), Smith retakes seventh from the Spaniard however. The fighting between Bradl and Crutchlow has allowed Lorenzo to close up to them significantly. At the straight before Stekkenwal (Turn Turn 8), Espargaró has retaken seventh place from Smith again. Lorenzo goes up the inside of Bradl at De Bult, promoting him up to fifth place. Pedrosa's gap back to Márquez is +0.649 in sector three.

Lap three and Rossi sets the fastest lap of the race. Pedrosa's gap back to Márquez is +0.565 seconds at the start/finish straight, increasing to +0.733 seconds in sector one. In sector two, the gap decreases to +0.630 before decreasing again to +0.708 seconds in sector three.

On lap four, the gap Pedrosa has to Márquez has decreased to +0.491 seconds at the start/finish straight. Rossi closes up to second place Márquez as Crutchlow sets the fastest lap. In sector one, the gap increases to +0.698 seconds as Lorenzo also closes up on Crutchlow in fourth. The gap decreases slightly to +0.659 seconds in sector two. At the run up to Duikersloot (Turn 11), Crutchlow goes a bit wide and Lorenzo makes good use of this by taking a shorter line a passing the Briton for fourth position. In sector three, the gap increases again to +0.876 seconds.

Lap five and Rossi dives down the inside of Márquez entering Haarbocht, taking second from him as the fans in the main grandstands cheer him on. Rossi is now opening a gap in pursuit of Pedrosa, Lorenzo doing likewise on Crutchlow to chase down Márquez.

On lap six, Rossi sets the fastest lap of the race. Pedrosa's gap at the start/finish straight was +0.405 seconds, decreasing to +0.339 seconds in sector one, dropping again to +0.288 seconds in sector two. In sector three, the gap diminishes again slightly to +0.227 seconds. At the Geert Timmer Bocht, Rossi goes up the inside of Pedrosa and takes over the lead of the race at the exit.

Lap seven and Rossi now leads the race for the first time. The top six is as follows: Rossi, Pedrosa, Márquez, Lorenzo, Crutchlow and Bradl. Márquez's gap back to Lorenzo is +0.824 seconds at the start/finish straight, decreasing to +0.717 seconds in sector one. It decreases again to +0.688 seconds in sector two and in sector three it drops once more to +0.546 seconds.

On lap eight, Márquez's gap back to Lorenzo increases to +0.754 seconds at the start/finish straight. At the entrance to De Bult, Márquez has a moment trying to stop his bike but doesn't lose any significant time over it.

Lap nine and Pedrosa is still relatively close to Rossi in second as third Márquez now starts to come under pressure from Lorenzo in fourth. Exiting Strubben, Lorenzo has now fully closed up to Márquez and at the short straight before De Bult, he closes up so much that he almost makes a move on his inside at the corner but thinks better of it at the last moment.

On lap ten, Crutchlow's gap back to Bradl is +3.601 seconds and Bradl's gap back to Álvaro Bautista is +3.867 seconds. No overtakes happen at the front.

Lap eleven and Rossi starts to open up a gap to Pedrosa. The front is stable for now.

On lap twelve, Lorenzo is now losing ground to Márquez as Crutchlow is right behind him also.

Lap thirteen - the halfway point of the race - and Márquez is closing the gap to teammate Pedrosa. Rossi is still out in front as Crutchlow is still right behind Lorenzo. At the Geert Timmer Bocht, he tries a move up the inside but isn't able to pass.

On lap fourteen, Rossi's gap back to Pedrosa is +0.372 seconds at the start/finish straight. Crutchlow is still right behind Lorenzo and attempts a move at Strubben but misses the speed to get past as the Spaniard also closes the door on him.

Lap fifteen and Rossi's gap back to Pedrosa is +0.522 seconds at the start/finish straight. In sector one, the gap increased to +0.655 seconds, then decreased to +0.478 seconds in sector two. In sector three, the gap widened again to +0.563 seconds in sector three. At the Geert Timmer Bocht, Crutchlow finally manages to get past by diving down the inside of Lorenzo at the entrance of the chicane, taking fourth as a result.

On lap sixteen, Rossi's gap back to Pedrosa has decreased slightly to +0.534 seconds at the start/finish line. Márquez's gap back to Crutchlow was +1.796 seconds at the start/finish line, decreasing to +1.491 seconds in sector one and increasing to +1.578 in sector two. In sector three, the gap drops again slightly in sector three to +1.451 seconds.

Lap seventeen and Márquez's gap back to Crutchlow has increased to +1.655 seconds at the start/finish straight. No overtakes happened at the front.

On lap eighteen, Márquez closes up to Pedrosa. At the end of the Veenslang, Márquez carries a lot more speed at the new, quick right-hand kink but runs wide entering the Ruskenhoek, allowing Pedrosa to get back at him exiting the turn. At the Geert Timmer Bocht, Márquez makes his move by going up the inside of his teammate and taking second place.

Lap nineteen and Rossi's gap back to Márquez is +1.044 seconds, showing that he has increased it since the pair were fighting. Crutchlow has also been able to close up as a result. In sector one, the gap has widened to +1.246 but has decreased in sector two, now only being +1.073 seconds. The gap increases again to +1.107 seconds in sector three.

On lap twenty, Rossi increases his gap back to Márquez again to +1.149 seconds. Meanwhile, Crutchlow in fourth is also slowly gaining on Pedrosa In sector one, the gap widens to +1.231 seconds. Entering Strubben, Crutchlow dives too deep and goes wide, giving some breathing room to Pedrosa. The gap increases again to +1.326 seconds in sector two, then decreases to +1.252 seconds in sector three.

Lap twenty-one and Rossi's gap back to Márquez has increased to +1.550 seconds. The gap widens again to +1.707 seconds in sector one, decreasing to +1.660 seconds in sector two. In sector three, the gap increases once more to +1.864 seconds as Crutchlow is right behind Pedrosa. At the Hoge Heide (Turn 13), the Briton is right behind Pedrosa and shadows him throughout the Ramshoek (Turn 15), going side-by-side with him and passing for third spot at the entrance of the Geert Timmer Bocht.

On lap twenty-two, Rossi's gap back to Márquez has decreased slightly to +1.825 seconds at the start/finish straight. Crutchlow is slowly opening up a gap to Pedrosa and is hunting down Márquez in second place.

Lap twenty-three and Márquez's gap back to Crutchlow was +0.633 seconds at the start/finish straight, decreasing slightly to +0.585 seconds in sector one. In sector two, the gap increased to +0.664 seconds, only to decrease to +0.381 seconds in sector three.

On lap twenty-four, Márquez's gap back to Crutchlow increased to +0.462 seconds at the start/finish straight. Crutchlow closes up even further but is not yet able to pass Márquez.

Lap twenty-five, the penultimate lap, and Crutchlow is still all over the rear of Márquez. At Strubben, the Spaniard blocks the inside line, preventing Crutchlow from attempting a move.

Rossi crosses the line to start the final lap - lap twenty-six - and Crutchlow has still not been able to pass Márquez. Entering the Haarbocht, Crutchlow makes a mistake and almost runs into Márquez but just manages to avoid him, ending his hopes for a second place. Rossi has no problems throughout the lap, exits the last corner, looks back to see how far back Márquez is and as the near entire grandstand stand on their feet to cheer and congratulate him, he raises his arm and crosses the line to win the race - his first and only of the season and the first since the 2010 Malaysian Grand Prix. Behind him is Márquez is second and Crutchlow in third place. Fourth is Pedrosa and Lorenzo comes home a superb fifth after struggling with a broken left collarbone only 36 hours earlier. Further back is Bradl who finishes in sixth spot.

On the parade lap back to parc-fermé, Rossi waves gleefully at the fans after winning a race in nearly three years. Lorenzo is seen suffering visibly with his left hand as a delighted Rossi shakes hands with Márquez while still on the bike. Rossi then raises his arm in the air multiple times as Lorenzo does so once as well. He then rides off the track to some of his fans that invaded the track as many of the fans in the grandstands wave the fluorescent yellow flags with the number 46 on it in pride. Some of the fans congratulate him as the photographers also surround him to make photo's. He steps off his bike and one of the fans offers him to sit on his shoulders, which he duly accepts. He lifts him up and walks him over to the grandstand here his fanclub sits. Márquez meanwhile calmly waves at the fans, as does Crutchlow. He claps his hands, then instructs the fans to stand up for him, the fans doing so in return. On his to the pit lane, Rossi then gets briefly stopped again by two of his fans before going again.

Crutchlow is the first to arrive at parc-fermé, the Briton removing his gloves as he has already stepped off the bike. Rossi is still riding back, throwing his arm in the air as Márquez also arrives at parc-fermé. As Lorenzo arrives at the pits, he is seen visibly in pain and even cries as he needs help from his team to push the bike back inside. Rossi - still riding back - briefly waves at the crowd, then puts his arm up in the air multiple times. By now, Márquez takes off his helmet as Rossi finally enters the pits, still with his arm up in the air as a salute to his fans. A happy Márquez talks and shakes hands with an equally delighted Crutchlow as Rossi finally arrives at parc-fermé, steps off his bike and immediately goes to celebrate with his team. When he's done, he looks at the camera happily, then kisses his number 46 and hugs one of the Factory Yamaha crewmembers. Lorenzo in his garage is still seen struggling as Rossi celebrates with Uccio and other members of his team. Both Rossi and Márquez then get interviewed by the media, after that Márquez goes and talks with his brother Álex Márquez and the Repsol Honda crewmembers.

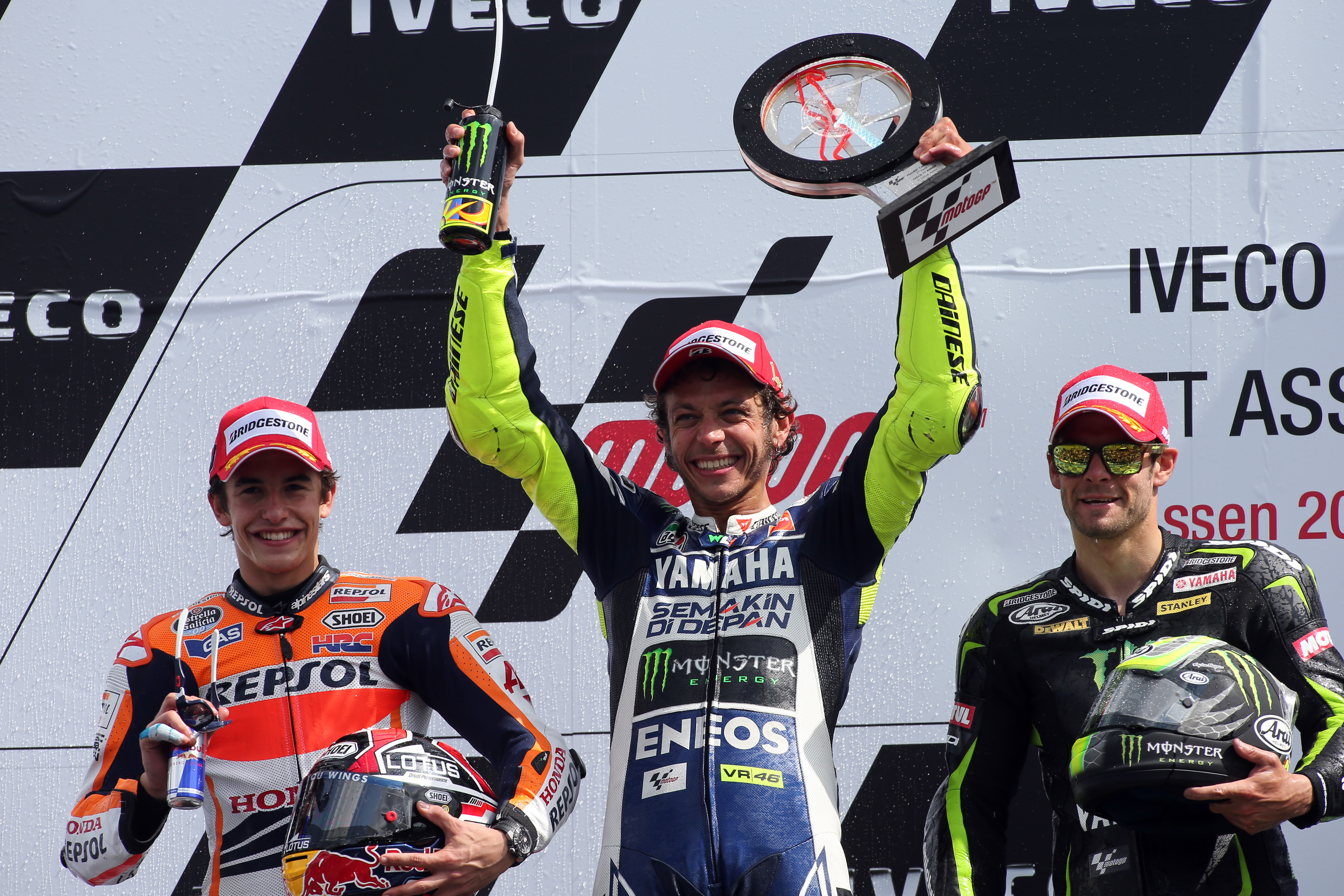
Marc Márquez, Valentino Rossi and Cal Crutchlow, celebrating on the podium. Rossi won the race, Márquez finished second and Crutchlow third.

All the riders make their way onto the podium, first one being Crutchlow followed by Márquez and a very happy Rossi, the crowd erupting in delight as he steps onto the podium. He symbolically kisses the top step of the podium before stepping onto it. The trophies get handed out: First Arjan Bos, President of the Board of the TT Circuit Assen, hands the constructors trophy out to Jeremy Burgess and Crutchlow. Next up is the second place trophy handed out by Lorenzo Sistino, Iveco brand President, which is handed out to Márquez. He raises the trophy happily up in the air as the crowd applauds him. Then it is Jacques Tichelaar, the King's commissioner of Drenthe, to present to Rossi the winner's trophy. He accepts the trophy, kisses it and then displays it for everyone to see. The crowd cheers and applauds as he does so, then the Italian national anthem plays for him. After it stops, the champagne gets handed out by the podium girls as Crutchlow immediately sprays Rossi, with Rossi cheekily spraying one of the podium girls instead. Márquez sprays Rossi, with 'The Doctor' returning the favour before also spraying it on Crutchlow, then into the crowd before drinking some of it. He toasts with the bottle afterwards with the other two before taking a group photo together.

Rossi's victory, Márquez's second and Crutchlow's third place has shaken up the championship. Pedrosa still leads the title with 136 points but the gap has now been reduced to 9 points as Lorenzo has been able to close up thanks to his ride to fifth and Pedrosa's fourth position. Lorenzo now sits second with 127 points while Márquez closes up to Lorenzo with 113 points.

== Classification ==
=== MotoGP ===
Pos.	No.	Rider	Team	Manufacturer	Laps	Time/Retired	Grid	Points
1	46	(Italy) Valentino Rossi	Yamaha Factory Racing	Yamaha	26	41:25.202	4	25
2	93	(Spain) Marc Márquez	Repsol Honda Team	Honda	26	+2.170	2	20
3	35	(United Kingdom) Cal Crutchlow	Monster Yamaha Tech 3	Yamaha	26	+4.073	1	16
4	26	(Spain) Dani Pedrosa	Repsol Honda Team	Honda	26	+7.832	5	13
5	99	(Spain) Jorge Lorenzo	Yamaha Factory Racing	Yamaha	26	+15.510	12	11
6	6	(Germany) Stefan Bradl	LCR Honda MotoGP	Honda	26	+27.519	3	10
7	19	(Spain) Álvaro Bautista	Go&Fun Honda Gresini	Honda	26	+31.598	8	9
8	41	(Spain) Aleix Espargaró	Power Electronics Aspar	ART	26	+32.405	7	8
9	38	(United Kingdom) Bradley Smith	Monster Yamaha Tech 3	Yamaha	26	+33.751	6	7
10	4	(Italy) Andrea Dovizioso	Ducati Team	Ducati	26	+33.801	15	6
11	69	(United States) Nicky Hayden	Ducati Team	Ducati	26	+34.371	10	5
12	14	(France) Randy de Puniet	Power Electronics Aspar	ART	26	+57.674	9	4
13	29	(Italy) Andrea Iannone	Energy T.I. Pramac Racing	Ducati	26	+1:01.424	13	3
14	51	(Italy) Michele Pirro	Ignite Pramac Racing	Ducati	26	+1:01.561	11	2
15	17	(Czech Republic) Karel Abraham	Cardion AB Motoracing	ART	26	+1:04.426	17	1
16	9	(Italy) Danilo Petrucci	Came IodaRacing Project	Ioda-Suter	26	+1:11.114	16	
17	5	(United States) Colin Edwards	NGM Mobile Forward Racing	FTR Kawasaki	26	+1:15.249	18	
18	71	(Italy) Claudio Corti	NGM Mobile Forward Racing	FTR Kawasaki	26	+1:24.884	20	
19	68	(Colombia) Yonny Hernández	Paul Bird Motorsport	ART	26	+1:25.854	21	
20	8	(Spain) Héctor Barberá	Avintia Blusens	FTR	26	+1:25.978	14	
21	67	(Australia) Bryan Staring	Go&Fun Honda Gresini	FTR Honda	26	+1:26.256	19	
22	70	(United Kingdom) Michael Laverty	Paul Bird Motorsport	PBM	26	+1:26.610	22	
23	22	(Spain) Iván Silva	Avintia Blusens	FTR	26	+1:38.173	24	
Ret	52	(Czech Republic) Lukáš Pešek	Came IodaRacing Project	Ioda-Suter	10	Retirement	23	

=== Moto2 ===
Pos	No	Rider	Manufacturer	Laps	Time	Grid	Points
1	40	(Spain) Pol Espargaró	Kalex	24	39:51.883	1	25
2	45	(United Kingdom) Scott Redding	Kalex	24	+0.117	3	20
3	77	(Switzerland) Dominique Aegerter	Suter	24	+3.509	10	16
4	36	(Finland) Mika Kallio	Kalex	24	+3.656	8	13
5	80	(Spain) Esteve Rabat	Kalex	24	+3.993	4	11
6	5	(France) Johann Zarco	Suter	24	+4.073	2	10
7	19	(Belgium) Xavier Siméon	Kalex	24	+9.095	5	9
8	12	(Switzerland) Thomas Lüthi	Suter	24	+12.271	17	8
9	81	(Spain) Jordi Torres	Suter	24	+13.745	15	7
10	60	(Spain) Julián Simón	Kalex	24	+16.312	14	6
11	4	(Switzerland) Randy Krummenacher	Suter	24	+16.773	19	5
12	96	(France) Louis Rossi	Tech 3	24	+17.247	18	4
13	23	(Germany) Marcel Schrötter	Kalex	24	+17.980	13	3
14	11	(Germany) Sandro Cortese	Kalex	24	+22.296	11	2
15	15	(San Marino) Alex de Angelis	Speed Up	24	+25.825	16	1
16	88	(Spain) Ricard Cardús	Speed Up	24	+26.126	22	
17	18	(Spain) Nicolás Terol	Suter	24	+29.943	25	
18	54	(Italy) Mattia Pasini	Speed Up	24	+32.967	7	
19	52	(United Kingdom) Danny Kent	Tech 3	24	+33.066	24	
20	14	(Thailand) Ratthapark Wilairot	Suter	24	+33.108	21	
21	49	(Spain) Axel Pons	Kalex	24	+40.301	26	
22	44	(South Africa) Steven Odendaal	Speed Up	24	+45.433	27	
23	17	(Spain) Alberto Moncayo	Speed Up	24	+48.616	28	
24	8	(United Kingdom) Gino Rea	FTR	24	+48.913	23	
25	72	(Japan) Yuki Takahashi	Moriwaki	24	+1:00.853	30	
26	7	(Indonesia) Doni Tata Pradita	Suter	24	+1:25.946	31	
27	97	(Indonesia) Rafid Topan Sucipto	Speed Up	23	+1 lap	32	
DSQ	95	(Australia) Anthony West	Speed Up	24	(+16.288)	6	
Ret	63	(France) Mike Di Meglio	Motobi	19	Accident	9	
Ret	9	(United Kingdom) Kyle Smith	Kalex	17	Accident	29	
Ret	3	(Italy) Simone Corsi	Speed Up	6	Accident	12	
DNS	24	(Spain) Toni Elías	Kalex		Crashed on warm-up lap	20	
DNS	30	(Japan) Takaaki Nakagami	Kalex		Injured		
OFFICIAL MOTO2 REPORT

=== Moto3 ===
Pos	No	Rider	Manufacturer	Laps	Time/Retired	Grid	Points
1	39	(Spain) Luis Salom	KTM	22	38:20.086	4	25
2	25	(Spain) Maverick Viñales	KTM	22	+0.122	3	20
3	42	(Spain) Álex Rins	KTM	22	+0.282	5	16
4	44	(Portugal) Miguel Oliveira	Mahindra	22	+0.378	1	13
5	12	(Spain) Álex Márquez	KTM	22	+0.416	2	11
6	94	(Germany) Jonas Folger	Kalex KTM	22	+19.646	6	10
7	8	(Australia) Jack Miller	FTR Honda	22	+27.688	14	9
8	61	(Australia) Arthur Sissis	KTM	22	+27.811	9	8
9	10	(France) Alexis Masbou	FTR Honda	22	+34.797	12	7
10	31	(Finland) Niklas Ajo	KTM	22	+34.823	7	6
11	32	(Spain) Isaac Viñales	FTR Honda	22	+35.130	8	5
12	7	(Spain) Efrén Vázquez	Mahindra	22	+35.361	17	4
13	23	(Italy) Niccolò Antonelli	FTR Honda	22	+35.523	10	3
14	5	(Italy) Romano Fenati	FTR Honda	22	+35.628	22	2
15	41	(South Africa) Brad Binder	Suter Honda	22	+35.886	21	1
16	84	(Czech Republic) Jakub Kornfeil	Kalex KTM	22	+35.948	18	
17	63	(Malaysia) Zulfahmi Khairuddin	KTM	22	+36.169	35	
18	89	(France) Alan Techer	TSR Honda	22	+36.486	13	
19	51	(Netherlands) Bryan Schouten	FTR Honda	22	+36.632	20	
20	77	(Italy) Lorenzo Baldassarri	FTR Honda	22	+36.747	15	
21	17	(United Kingdom) John McPhee	FTR Honda	22	+38.583	24	
22	65	(Germany) Philipp Öttl	Kalex KTM	22	+50.764	25	
23	11	(Belgium) Livio Loi	Kalex KTM	22	+50.843	16	
24	9	(Germany) Toni Finsterbusch	Kalex KTM	22	+50.963	26	
25	19	(Italy) Alessandro Tonucci	FTR Honda	22	+51.168	23	
26	4	(Italy) Francesco Bagnaia	FTR Honda	22	+51.285	19	
27	3	(Italy) Matteo Ferrari	FTR Honda	22	+51.748	31	
28	57	(Brazil) Eric Granado	Kalex KTM	22	+58.945	27	
29	22	(Spain) Ana Carrasco	KTM	22	+1:10.891	30	
30	66	(Germany) Florian Alt	Kalex KTM	22	+1:37.593	34	
31	29	(Japan) Hyuga Watanabe	FTR Honda	22	+1:37.767	28	
Ret	53	(Netherlands) Jasper Iwema	Kalex KTM	18	Accident	11	
Ret	71	(Netherlands) Thomas van Leeuwen	Bakker Honda	17	Retirement	33	
Ret	99	(United Kingdom) Danny Webb	Suter Honda	9	Accident	29	
Ret	58	(Spain) Juan Francisco Guevara	TSR Honda	0	Accident	32	
OFFICIAL MOTO3 REPORT

== Championship standings after the race (MotoGP) ==
Below are the standings for the top five riders and constructors after round seven has concluded.

Riders' Championship standings

Pos.	Rider	Points
1	(Spain) Dani Pedrosa	136
2	(Spain) Jorge Lorenzo	127
3	(Spain) Marc Márquez	113
4	(United Kingdom) Cal Crutchlow	87
5	(Italy) Valentino Rossi	85

Constructors' Championship standings

Pos.	Constructor	Points
1	(Japan) Yamaha	152
2	(Japan) Honda	151
3	(Italy) Ducati	66
4	(Italy) ART	44
5	(United Kingdom) FTR	14

- Note: Only the top five positions are included for both sets of standings.

Previous race: 2013 Catalan Grand Prix	FIM Grand Prix World Championship; 2013 season	Next race: 2013 German Grand Prix
Previous race: 2012 Dutch TT	Dutch TT	Next race: 2014 Dutch TT
