= Ricard Cardús =

Spanish motorcycle racer

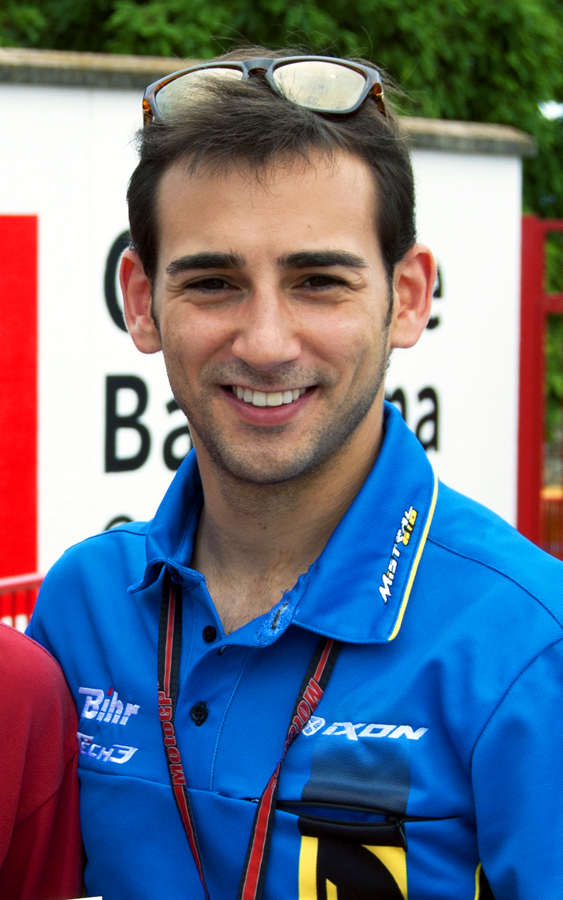
- Cardús in 2014.
- Nationality: Spanish
- Born: 18 March 1988 (age 38); Barcelona, Spain
- Current team: Team StyloBike
- Bike number: 88
Motorcycle racing career statistics
Moto2 World Championship
Active years	2010–2017
Manufacturers	Suter, Bimota, Moriwaki, AJR, Speed Up, Tech 3, KTM, Kalex
Championships	0
2017 championship position	29th (7 pts)
Starts / Wins / Podiums / Poles / F. laps / Points; 93 / 0 / 0 / 0 / 0 / 93
125cc World Championship
Active years	2007–2008
Manufacturers	Aprilia, Derbi
Championships	0
2008 championship position	NC (0 pts)
Starts / Wins / Podiums / Poles / F. laps / Points; 3 / 0 / 0 / 0 / 0 / 0

Ricard Cardús González (born 18 March 1988) is a Grand Prix motorcycle racer from Spain. He is the nephew of Carlos Cardús. He is a former competitor of the Spanish 125GP Championship and the Spanish Supersport Championship. He most recently competed in the Moto2 World Championship and the FIM CEV Moto2 European Championship in 2017. He is the nephew of Carlos Cardús.

== Career statistics ==
=== FIM CEV Moto2 European Championship ===
==== Races by year ====
(key)

Year	Bike	1	2	3	4	5	6	7	8	9	10	11	Pos	Pts
2014		JER; 6	ARA1	ARA2	CAT	ALB	NAV1	NAV2	ALG1	ALG2	VAL		25th	10
2016	Transfiormers	VAL1	VAL2	ARA1	ARA2	CAT1; 1	CAT2; 2	ALB	ALG1	ALG2	JER	VAL; 3	9th	61
2017	Kalex	ALB	CAT1; 1	CAT2; 1	VAL1; 2	VAL2; 2	EST1; 2	EST2; 11	JER; 1	ARA1; 1	ARA2; 2	VAL; Ret	2nd	185

=== Grand Prix motorcycle racing ===
==== By season ====
Season	Class	Motorcycle	Team	Race	Win	Podium	Pole	FLap	Pts	Plcd
2007	125cc	Aprilia	RACC Aprilia	1	0	0	0	0	0	NC
2008	125cc	Derbi	Andalucía Derbi	2	0	0	0	0	0	NC
2010	Moto2	Suter	Viessmann Kiefer Racing	8	0	0	0	0	0	NC
2010	Moto2	Bimota	Maquinza-SAG Team	8	0	0	0	0	0	NC
2011	Moto2	Moriwaki	QMMF Racing Team	13	0	0	0	0	2	31st
2012	Moto2	AJR	Arguiñano Racing Team	14	0	0	0	0	10	25th
2013	Moto2	Speed Up	NGM Mobile Forward Racing	17	0	0	0	0	9	23rd
2014	Moto2	Tech 3	Tech 3	18	0	0	0	0	45	18th
2015	Moto2	Tech 3	Tech 3	17	0	0	0	0	20	24th
2015	Moto2	Suter	JPMoto Malaysia	17	0	0	0	0	20	24th
2016	Moto2	Suter	JPMoto Malaysia	1	0	0	0	0	0	NC
2017	Moto2	Speed Up	Speed Up Racing	5	0	0	0	0	7	29th
2017	Moto2	KTM	Red Bull KTM Ajo	5	0	0	0	0	7	29th
2017	Moto2	Kalex	CarXpert Interwetten	5	0	0	0	0	7	29th
Total				96	0	0	0	0	93	

==== Races by year ====
(key)

Year	Class	Team	1	2	3	4	5	6	7	8	9	10	11	12	13	14	15	16	17	18	Pos	Pts
2007	125cc	Aprilia	QAT	SPA	TUR	CHN	FRA	ITA	CAT	GBR	NED	GER	CZE; 23	RSM	POR; DNS	JPN	AUS	MAL	VAL		NC	0
2008	125cc	Derbi	QAT	SPA	POR	CHN	FRA	ITA	CAT; 26	GBR	NED	GER	CZE	RSM	INP	JPN	AUS	MAL	VAL; Ret		NC	0
2010	Moto2	Suter	QAT	SPA	FRA	ITA	GBR	NED	CAT; 23												NC	0
2010	Moto2	Bimota								GER; Ret	CZE; 24	INP; Ret	RSM; 20	ARA; Ret	JPN; 27	MAL	AUS	POR; Ret	VAL; DNS		NC	0
2011	Moto2	Moriwaki	QAT; 17	SPA; 22	POR; 14	FRA; Ret	CAT; DNS	GBR	NED; 19	ITA; 22	GER; 28	CZE; 22	INP; 19	RSM; 21	ARA; 25	JPN; Ret	AUS; 17	MAL; DNS	VAL		31st	2
2012	Moto2	AJR	QAT; 24	SPA; 19	POR; 15	FRA; Ret	CAT; 19	GBR; 23	NED; 18	GER; 13	ITA; 15	INP; 14	CZE; DNS	RSM	ARA	JPN; 21	MAL; 14	AUS; 16	VAL; 15		25th	10
2013	Moto2	Speed Up	QAT; Ret	AME; 14	SPA; 20	FRA; NC	ITA; 19	CAT; 23	NED; 16	GER; 16	INP; 18	CZE; 18	GBR; 17	RSM; Ret	ARA; 19	MAL; 13	AUS; 12	JPN; 17	VAL; 22		23rd	9
2014	Moto2	Tech 3	QAT; 12	AME; 10	ARG; Ret	SPA; 13	FRA; 26	ITA; 19	CAT; 7	NED; 16	GER; 11	INP; 15	CZE; 20	GBR; 16	RSM; Ret	ARA; 14	JPN; 9	AUS; 16	MAL; 12	VAL; 12	18th	45
2015	Moto2	Tech 3	QAT; Ret	AME; 17	ARG; 18	SPA; Ret	FRA; 16	ITA; 17	CAT; Ret	NED; Ret	GER; 19	INP									24th	20
2015	Moto2	Suter											CZE; 24	GBR; 10	RSM; Ret	ARA; 18	JPN; 6	AUS; 14	MAL; 14	VAL; 19	24th	20
2016	Moto2	Suter	QAT	ARG	AME	SPA	FRA	ITA; 19	CAT	NED	GER	AUT	CZE	GBR	RSM	ARA	JPN	AUS	MAL	VAL	NC	0
2017	Moto2	Speed Up	QAT; 25	ARG																	29th	7
2017	Moto2	KTM			AME; 14	SPA; 14	FRA; 13	ITA	CAT	NED	GER	CZE	AUT	GBR	RSM	ARA	JPN	AUS	MAL		29th	7
2017	Moto2	Kalex																		VAL; Ret	29th	7
