= 2013 German motorcycle Grand Prix =

(Germany) 2013 German Grand Prix
Race details
- Race 8 of 18 races in the 2013 Grand Prix motorcycle racing season
- Date: 14 July 2013
- Official name: eni Motorrad Grand Prix Deutschland
- Location: Sachsenring
- Course: Permanent racing facility; 3.671 km (2.281 mi)

MotoGP
Pole position
Rider	(Spain) Marc Márquez	Honda
Time	1:21.311	
Fastest lap
Rider	(Spain) Marc Márquez	Honda
Time	1:22.066 on lap 16	
Podium
First	(Spain) Marc Márquez	Honda
Second	(United Kingdom) Cal Crutchlow	Yamaha
Third	(Italy) Valentino Rossi	Yamaha

Moto2
Pole position
Rider	(Belgium) Xavier Siméon	Kalex
Time	1:24.665	
Fastest lap
Rider	(Spain) Julián Simón	Kalex
Time	1:24.809 on lap 5	
Podium
First	(Spain) Jordi Torres	Suter
Second	(Italy) Simone Corsi	Speed Up
Third	(Spain) Pol Espargaró	Kalex

Moto3
Pole position
Rider	(Spain) Álex Rins	KTM
Time	1:27.300	
Fastest lap
Rider	(Spain) Luis Salom	KTM
Time	1:27.183 on lap 4	
Podium
First	(Spain) Álex Rins	KTM
Second	(Spain) Luis Salom	KTM
Third	(Spain) Maverick Viñales	KTM

The 2013 German motorcycle Grand Prix was the eighth round of the 2013 MotoGP season. It was scheduled to be held at the Sachsenring in Hohenstein-Ernstthal on 14 July 2013.

In Moto2, Kalex rider Xavier Siméon secured his first pole position, the first for a Belgian rider since Didier de Radiguès took pole position in the 250cc class at the 1989 Belgian motorcycle Grand Prix.

In MotoGP, Jorge Lorenzo and Dani Pedrosa were forced out of the event due to injuries.

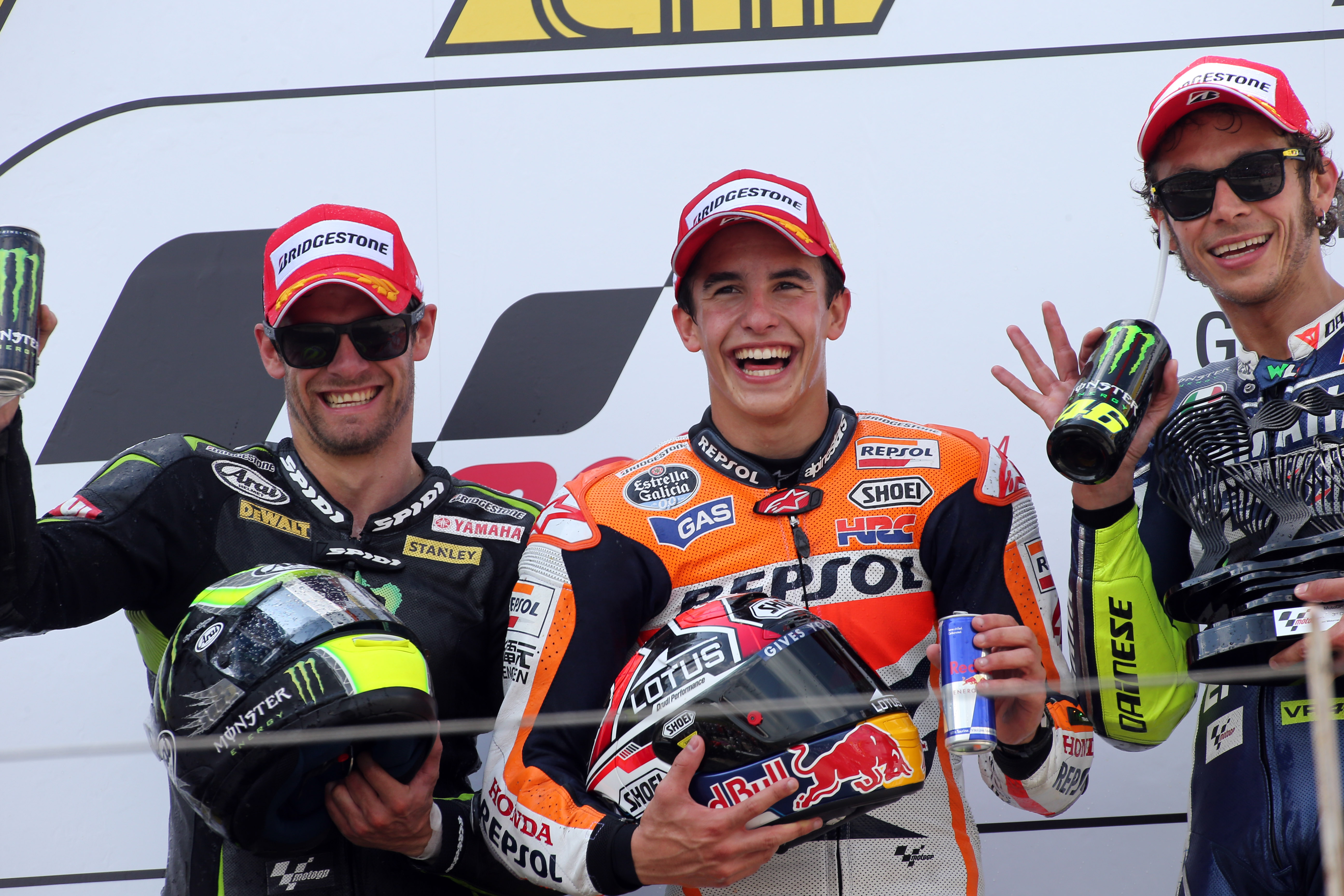
Cal Crutchlow, Marc Márquez and Valentino Rossi, celebrating on the podium after finishing second, first and third in the MotoGP race.

== Classification ==
=== MotoGP ===
Pos.	No.	Rider	Team	Manufacturer	Laps	Time/Retired	Grid	Points
1	93	(Spain) Marc Márquez	Repsol Honda Team	Honda	30	41:14.653	1	25
2	35	(United Kingdom) Cal Crutchlow	Monster Yamaha Tech 3	Yamaha	30	+1.559	2	20
3	46	(Italy) Valentino Rossi	Yamaha Factory Racing	Yamaha	30	+9.620	3	16
4	6	(Germany) Stefan Bradl	LCR Honda MotoGP	Honda	30	+13.992	4	13
5	19	(Spain) Álvaro Bautista	Go&Fun Honda Gresini	Honda	30	+21.775	8	11
6	38	(United Kingdom) Bradley Smith	Monster Yamaha Tech 3	Yamaha	30	+25.080	7	10
7	4	(Italy) Andrea Dovizioso	Ducati Team	Ducati	30	+30.027	9	9
8	41	(Spain) Aleix Espargaró	Power Electronics Aspar	ART	30	+30.324	5	8
9	69	(United States) Nicky Hayden	Ducati Team	Ducati	30	+45.355	6	7
10	51	(Italy) Michele Pirro	Ignite Pramac Racing	Ducati	30	+47.142	14	6
11	8	(Spain) Héctor Barberá	Avintia Blusens	FTR	30	+47.824	13	5
12	14	(France) Randy de Puniet	Power Electronics Aspar	ART	30	+48.523	12	4
13	5	(United States) Colin Edwards	NGM Mobile Forward Racing	FTR Kawasaki	30	+54.428	17	3
14	9	(Italy) Danilo Petrucci	Came IodaRacing Project	Ioda-Suter	30	+1:00.323	11	2
15	71	(Italy) Claudio Corti	NGM Mobile Forward Racing	FTR Kawasaki	30	+1:05.530	10	1
16	70	(United Kingdom) Michael Laverty	Paul Bird Motorsport	PBM	30	+1:09.153	15	
17	7	(Japan) Hiroshi Aoyama	Avintia Blusens	FTR	30	+1:15.601	19	
18	17	(Czech Republic) Karel Abraham	Cardion AB Motoracing	ART	30	+1:19.683	18	
19	52	(Czech Republic) Lukáš Pešek	Came IodaRacing Project	Ioda-Suter	29	+1 lap	20	
Ret	67	(Australia) Bryan Staring	Go&Fun Honda Gresini	FTR Honda	27	Accident	21	
Ret	68	(Colombia) Yonny Hernández	Paul Bird Motorsport	ART	1	Accident	16	
DNS	26	(Spain) Dani Pedrosa	Repsol Honda Team	Honda		Injured		
DNS	29	(Italy) Andrea Iannone	Energy T.I. Pramac Racing	Ducati		Injured		
DNS	99	(Spain) Jorge Lorenzo	Yamaha Factory Racing	Yamaha		Injured		

=== Moto2 ===
Pos	No	Rider	Manufacturer	Laps	Time	Grid	Points
1	81	(Spain) Jordi Torres	Suter	29	41:19.636	2	25
2	3	(Italy) Simone Corsi	Speed Up	29	+2.164	5	20
3	40	(Spain) Pol Espargaró	Kalex	29	+2.494	3	16
4	60	(Spain) Julián Simón	Kalex	29	+5.409	6	13
5	15	(San Marino) Alex de Angelis	Speed Up	29	+7.546	10	11
6	12	(Switzerland) Thomas Lüthi	Suter	29	+7.827	4	10
7	45	(United Kingdom) Scott Redding	Kalex	29	+11.241	8	9
8	19	(Belgium) Xavier Siméon	Kalex	29	+12.810	1	8
9	77	(Switzerland) Dominique Aegerter	Suter	29	+13.119	18	7
10	30	(Japan) Takaaki Nakagami	Kalex	29	+13.285	7	6
11	5	(France) Johann Zarco	Suter	29	+13.533	11	5
12	36	(Finland) Mika Kallio	Kalex	29	+16.475	9	4
13	80	(Spain) Esteve Rabat	Kalex	29	+25.551	23	3
14	11	(Germany) Sandro Cortese	Kalex	29	+30.891	19	2
15	49	(Spain) Axel Pons	Kalex	29	+36.247	24	1
16	88	(Spain) Ricard Cardús	Speed Up	29	+36.392	15	
17	4	(Switzerland) Randy Krummenacher	Suter	29	+36.889	14	
18	72	(Japan) Yuki Takahashi	Moriwaki	29	+39.862	20	
19	54	(Italy) Mattia Pasini	Speed Up	29	+40.232	21	
20	24	(Spain) Toni Elías	Kalex	29	+47.005	28	
21	96	(France) Louis Rossi	Tech 3	29	+50.820	27	
22	14	(Thailand) Ratthapark Wilairot	Suter	29	+50.962	25	
23	8	(United Kingdom) Gino Rea	FTR	29	+51.410	17	
24	63	(France) Mike Di Meglio	Motobi	29	+52.160	26	
25	44	(South Africa) Steven Odendaal	Speed Up	29	+1:03.816	30	
26	7	(Indonesia) Doni Tata Pradita	Suter	29	+1:23.211	33	
27	97	(Indonesia) Rafid Topan Sucipto	Speed Up	28	+1 lap	34	
DSQ	95	(Australia) Anthony West	Speed Up	29	(+12.768)	16	
Ret	18	(Spain) Nicolás Terol	Suter	25	Retirement	12	
Ret	28	(Spain) Román Ramos	Speed Up	21	Retirement	31	
Ret	23	(Germany) Marcel Schrötter	Kalex	15	Accident	13	
Ret	9	(United Kingdom) Kyle Smith	Kalex	5	Accident	29	
Ret	52	(United Kingdom) Danny Kent	Tech 3	2	Accident	22	
Ret	92	(Spain) Álex Mariñelarena	Suter	2	Accident	32	
OFFICIAL MOTO2 REPORT

=== Moto3 ===
Pos	No	Rider	Manufacturer	Laps	Time/Retired	Grid	Points
1	42	(Spain) Álex Rins	KTM	27	39:34.735	1	25
2	39	(Spain) Luis Salom	KTM	27	+0.232	2	20
3	25	(Spain) Maverick Viñales	KTM	27	+0.248	6	16
4	44	(Portugal) Miguel Oliveira	Mahindra	27	+4.982	3	13
5	12	(Spain) Álex Márquez	KTM	27	+5.201	10	11
6	7	(Spain) Efrén Vázquez	Mahindra	27	+5.456	7	10
7	8	(Australia) Jack Miller	FTR Honda	27	+10.659	5	9
8	94	(Germany) Jonas Folger	Kalex KTM	27	+15.593	4	8
9	41	(South Africa) Brad Binder	Suter Honda	27	+18.406	14	7
10	61	(Australia) Arthur Sissis	KTM	27	+18.447	15	6
11	84	(Czech Republic) Jakub Kornfeil	Kalex KTM	27	+18.562	18	5
12	32	(Spain) Isaac Viñales	FTR Honda	27	+20.093	11	4
13	5	(Italy) Romano Fenati	FTR Honda	27	+20.151	8	3
14	53	(Netherlands) Jasper Iwema	Kalex KTM	27	+20.646	9	2
15	23	(Italy) Niccolò Antonelli	FTR Honda	27	+22.797	13	1
16	63	(Malaysia) Zulfahmi Khairuddin	KTM	27	+23.845	12	
17	65	(Germany) Philipp Öttl	Kalex KTM	27	+24.485	17	
18	31	(Finland) Niklas Ajo	KTM	27	+36.968	25	
19	89	(France) Alan Techer	TSR Honda	27	+37.073	20	
20	3	(Italy) Matteo Ferrari	FTR Honda	27	+37.204	28	
21	9	(Germany) Toni Finsterbusch	Kalex KTM	27	+51.410	27	
22	11	(Belgium) Livio Loi	Kalex KTM	27	+52.549	26	
23	17	(United Kingdom) John McPhee	FTR Honda	27	+53.937	19	
24	22	(Spain) Ana Carrasco	KTM	27	+54.241	29	
25	58	(Spain) Juan Francisco Guevara	TSR Honda	27	+54.598	24	
26	19	(Italy) Alessandro Tonucci	FTR Honda	27	+54.751	22	
27	29	(Japan) Hyuga Watanabe	FTR Honda	27	+55.202	32	
28	95	(France) Jules Danilo	Suter Honda	27	+1:21.376	35	
29	66	(Germany) Florian Alt	Kalex KTM	27	+1:24.498	34	
30	4	(Italy) Francesco Bagnaia	FTR Honda	26	+1 lap	23	
Ret	77	(Italy) Lorenzo Baldassarri	FTR Honda	8	Accident	16	
Ret	21	(Germany) Luca Amato	Mahindra	7	Accident	33	
Ret	57	(Brazil) Eric Granado	Kalex KTM	3	Accident	31	
Ret	86	(Germany) Kevin Hanus	Honda	3	Accident	30	
DNS	10	(France) Alexis Masbou	FTR Honda		Technical problem	21	
OFFICIAL MOTO3 REPORT

== Championship standings after the race (MotoGP) ==
Below are the standings for the top five riders and constructors after round eight has concluded.

Riders' Championship standings

Pos.	Rider	Points
1	(Spain) Marc Márquez	138
2	(Spain) Dani Pedrosa	136
3	(Spain) Jorge Lorenzo	127
4	(United Kingdom) Cal Crutchlow	107
5	(Italy) Valentino Rossi	101

Constructors' Championship standings

Pos.	Constructor	Points
1	(Japan) Honda	176
2	(Japan) Yamaha	172
3	(Italy) Ducati	75
4	(Italy) ART	52
5	(United Kingdom) FTR	19

- Note: Only the top five positions are included for both sets of standings.

Previous race: 2013 Dutch TT	FIM Grand Prix World Championship; 2013 season	Next race: 2013 United States Grand Prix
Previous race: 2012 German Grand Prix	German motorcycle Grand Prix	Next race: 2014 German Grand Prix
