= 2013 MotoGP World Championship =

65th running of the MotoGP World Championship

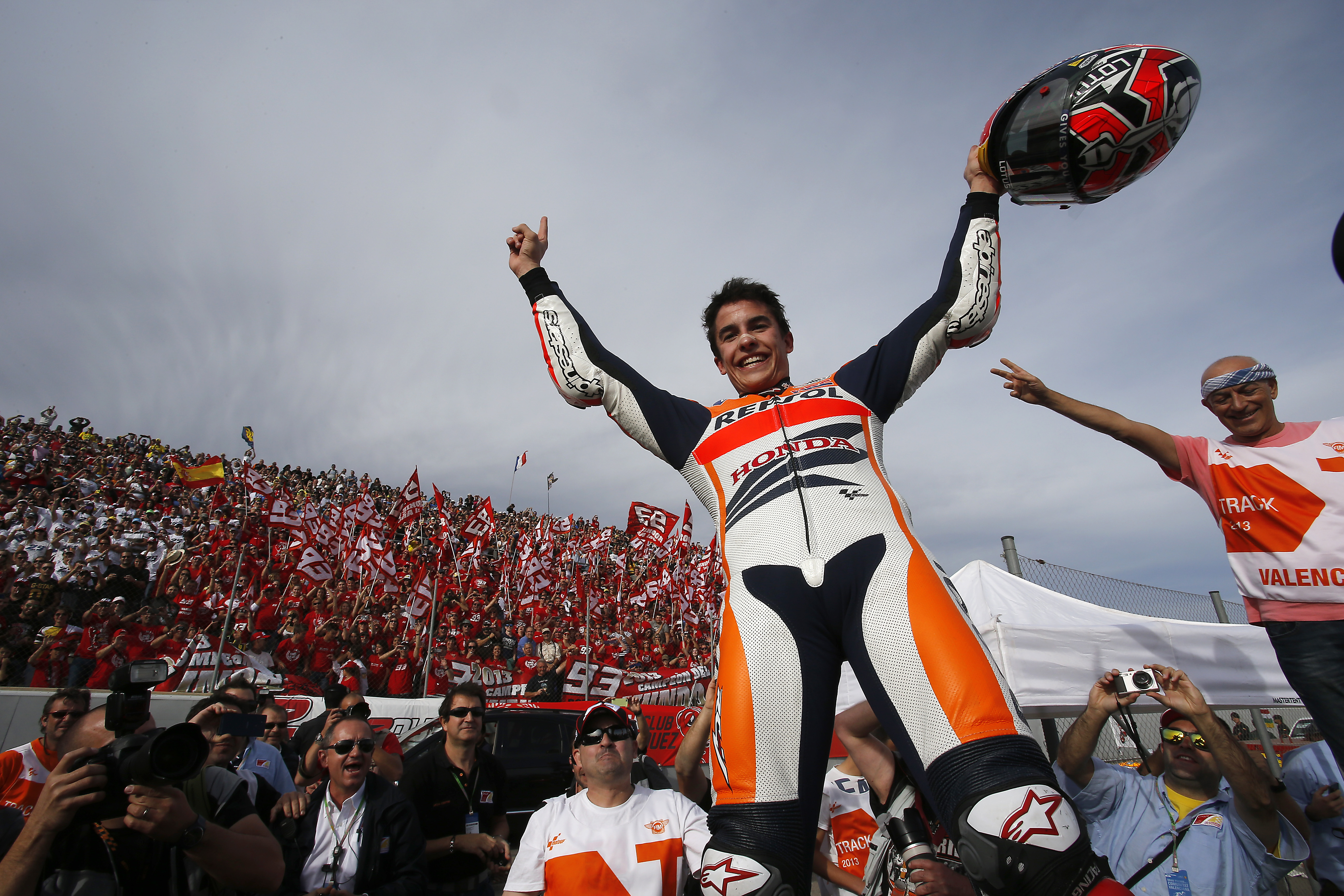
Marc Márquez was the 2013 MotoGP World Riders' Champion.

The 2013 FIM MotoGP World Championship was the premier class of the 65th Fédération Internationale de Motocyclisme (FIM) Road Racing World Championship season, the highest level of competition in motorcycle road racing.

== Season summary ==
Jorge Lorenzo started the season as the defending World Champion, while Honda was the defending Manufacturers' Champion. Moto2 champion Marc Márquez joined the MotoGP grid with Repsol Honda.

In the premier MotoGP class, Lorenzo, along with Repsol Honda teammates Marc Márquez and Dani Pedrosa battled it out for most of the season in regards to the championship battle. Lorenzo won the opening race of the season in Qatar, before rookie Márquez became the youngest premier class winner, as he claimed victory in the inaugural Grand Prix of the Americas in Texas. Pedrosa took back-to-back victories at Jerez – where Márquez and Lorenzo battled for second place, clashing at the final corner – and Le Mans, before Lorenzo did likewise at Mugello, and Catalunya; at the former, Márquez retired from the race after crashing out of second place. At Assen, Lorenzo crashed during free practice and fractured his collarbone, and after emergency surgery and initial reports that he would not take part for the rest of the weekend, he competed in the race and finished fifth. Márquez and Pedrosa finished second and fourth respectively, as Valentino Rossi took his first race victory since 2010. Márquez then won the next four races, starting at the Sachsenring, where both Lorenzo and Pedrosa were sidelined with injuries; Lorenzo with a recurrence of his Assen injury after crashing in free practice once again, while Pedrosa was ruled out with low blood pressure, stemming from a separate incident.

After two more victories for Lorenzo at Silverstone, and Misano, Márquez and Pedrosa collided at the Aragon Grand Prix, where a slight touch caused a sensor on Pedrosa's bike to tear and cut the traction control system. Márquez went on to beat Lorenzo to victory, and after Pedrosa won in Malaysia, Márquez held a 43-point lead in the championship with three races to go. However, a disqualification in Australia, as well as Lorenzo winning both in Australia and Japan reduced that margin to thirteen, ahead of the final race in Valencia; the first final race title decider since 2006. After battling Pedrosa and Lorenzo in the early stages of the race, Márquez finished third in the race to become the youngest premier class champion, beating Freddie Spencer's record from 1983. As well as this, Márquez became the first rookie since Kenny Roberts in 1978 to win the championship in their début season, and only the fourth rider to win world championships in three different categories after Mike Hailwood, Phil Read and Rossi. Pedrosa's second place, behind Lorenzo, was enough for Honda to clinch the constructors' championship.

=== Regulation changes ===
The MotoGP class saw the introduction of a new qualifying system, in which the riders placed eleventh or lower based on times in Free Practice 3 were sent to Qualifying 1. The two fastest riders from that session would then join the ten fastest riders in Qualifying 2 to set the first 12 positions of the starting grid.

== Calendar ==
The Fédération Internationale de Motocyclisme released a 19-race provisional calendar on 19 September 2012. On 23 November 2012, the calendar was updated following confirmation that the return of the Argentine Grand Prix would be postponed to 2014. The Grand Prix of the Americas held at the Circuit of the Americas in Austin, United States, replaced the Portuguese Grand Prix, which had been run at Estoril since 2000. The United States hosted three races, the other two being the United States Grand Prix at Mazda Raceway Laguna Seca and the Indianapolis Grand Prix at the Indianapolis Motor Speedway.

The following Grands Prix took place in 2013:

Round	Date	Grand Prix	Circuit
1	7 April ‡	Commercialbank Grand Prix of Qatar	Lusail International Circuit, Lusail
2	21 April	(United States) Red Bull Grand Prix of the Americas	Circuit of the Americas, Austin
3	5 May	(Spain) Gran Premio bwin de España	Circuito de Jerez, Jerez de la Frontera
4	19 May	Monster Energy Grand Prix de France	Bugatti Circuit, Le Mans
5	2 June	(Italy) Gran Premio d'Italia TIM	Mugello Circuit, Scarperia e San Piero
6	16 June	(Catalonia) Gran Premi Aperol de Catalunya	Circuit de Barcelona-Catalunya, Montmeló
7	29 June ††	(Netherlands) Iveco TT Assen	TT Circuit Assen, Assen
8	14 July	(Germany) eni Motorrad Grand Prix Deutschland	Sachsenring, Hohenstein-Ernstthal
9	21 July	(United States) Red Bull U.S. Grand Prix	Laguna Seca, Monterey
10	18 August	Red Bull Indianapolis Grand Prix	Indianapolis Motor Speedway, Speedway
11	25 August	(Czech Republic) bwin Grand Prix České republiky	Brno Circuit, Brno
12	1 September	(United Kingdom) Hertz British Grand Prix	Silverstone Circuit, Silverstone
13	15 September	Gran Premio Aperol di San Marino e Della Riviera di Rimini	Misano World Circuit, Misano Adriatico
14	29 September	(Aragon) Gran Premio Iveco de Aragón	MotorLand Aragón, Alcañiz
15	13 October	(Malaysia) Shell Advance Malaysian Motorcycle Grand Prix	Sepang International Circuit, Sepang
16	20 October	(Australia) Tissot Australian Grand Prix	Phillip Island Grand Prix Circuit, Phillip Island
17	27 October	AirAsia Grand Prix of Japan	Motegi Circuit, Motegi
18	10 November	(Valencian Community) Gran Premio Generali de la Comunitat Valenciana	Circuit Ricardo Tormo, Valencia

‡ = Night race
†† = Saturday race

=== Calendar changes ===
- The Grand Prix of the Americas was added to the calendar.
- The Portuguese Grand Prix was taken off the calendar. The race was scheduled on the calendar since 2000.
- The British Grand Prix was moved back, from 17 June to 1 September.
- The Japanese Grand Prix was moved back, from 14 to 27 October.

== Teams and riders ==
- A provisional entry list was released by the Fédération Internationale de Motocyclisme on 28 November 2012. An updated entry list was released on 12 February 2013.

Prototype entries
Team	Constructor		Motorcycle	No.	Rider	Rounds
(Italy) Ducati Team	Ducati		Desmosedici GP13	04	(Italy) Andrea Dovizioso	All
(Italy) Ducati Team	Ducati		Desmosedici GP13	69	(United States) Nicky Hayden	All
(Italy) Ducati Test Team	Ducati		Desmosedici GP13	51	(Italy) Michele Pirro	3, 5, 18
(Italy) Ignite Pramac Racing (Italy) Energy T.I. Pramac Racing	Ducati		Desmosedici GP13	11	(United States) Ben Spies	1–2, 5, 10
(Italy) Ignite Pramac Racing (Italy) Energy T.I. Pramac Racing	Ducati		Desmosedici GP13	51	(Italy) Michele Pirro	4, 6–8, 11–13
(Italy) Ignite Pramac Racing (Italy) Energy T.I. Pramac Racing	Ducati		Desmosedici GP13	15	(San Marino) Alex de Angelis	9
(Italy) Ignite Pramac Racing (Italy) Energy T.I. Pramac Racing	Ducati		Desmosedici GP13	68	(Colombia) Yonny Hernández	14–18
(Italy) Ignite Pramac Racing (Italy) Energy T.I. Pramac Racing	Ducati		Desmosedici GP13	29	(Italy) Andrea Iannone	1–8, 10–18
(Japan) Repsol Honda Team	Honda		RC213V	26	(Spain) Dani Pedrosa	All
(Japan) Repsol Honda Team	Honda		RC213V	93	(Spain) Marc Márquez	All
(Monaco) LCR Honda MotoGP	Honda		RC213V	6	(Germany) Stefan Bradl	All
(Italy) Go&Fun Honda Gresini	Honda		RC213V	19	(Spain) Álvaro Bautista	All
(Japan) Yamaha Factory Racing	Yamaha		YZR-M1	46	(Italy) Valentino Rossi	All
(Japan) Yamaha Factory Racing	Yamaha		YZR-M1	99	(Spain) Jorge Lorenzo	All
(Japan) Yamaha YSP Racing Team	Yamaha		YZR-M1	21	(Japan) Katsuyuki Nakasuga	17
(France) Monster Yamaha Tech 3	Yamaha		YZR-M1	35	(United Kingdom) Cal Crutchlow	All
(France) Monster Yamaha Tech 3	Yamaha		YZR-M1	38	(United Kingdom) Bradley Smith	All
Claiming Rule Teams (CRT) entries
Team	Constructor	Engine	Motorcycle	No.	Rider	Rounds
(United States) Attack Performance Racing	APR	Kawasaki	APR	79	(United States) Blake Young	2, 9–10
(Spain) Power Electronics Aspar	ART	Aprilia	GP13	14	(France) Randy de Puniet	All
(Spain) Power Electronics Aspar	ART	Aprilia	GP13	41	(Spain) Aleix Espargaró	All
(Czech Republic) Cardion AB Motoracing	ART	Aprilia	GP13	17	(Czech Republic) Karel Abraham	1–11, 13
(Czech Republic) Cardion AB Motoracing	ART	Aprilia	GP13	23	(Italy) Luca Scassa	14–18
(United Kingdom) Paul Bird Motorsport	ART	Aprilia	GP13	68	(Colombia) Yonny Hernández	1–13
(United Kingdom) Paul Bird Motorsport	ART	Aprilia	GP13	70	(United Kingdom) Michael Laverty	14–18
(United Kingdom) Paul Bird Motorsport	PBM	Aprilia	01	70	(United Kingdom) Michael Laverty	1–13
(United Kingdom) Paul Bird Motorsport	PBM	Aprilia	01	50	(Australia) Damian Cudlin	14–18
(United States) GP Tech	BCL	Suzuki	GP212	44	(United States) Michael Barnes	2
(Switzerland) NGM Mobile Forward Racing	FTR Kawasaki	Kawasaki	MGP13	5	(United States) Colin Edwards	All
(Switzerland) NGM Mobile Forward Racing	FTR Kawasaki	Kawasaki	MGP13	71	(Italy) Claudio Corti	All
(Spain) Avintia Blusens	FTR	Kawasaki	MGP13	7	(Japan) Hiroshi Aoyama	1–6, 8–18 (Note: Hiroshi Aoyama competed in the two Friday practice sessions during round 6, before being replaced by Javier del Amor.)
(Spain) Avintia Blusens	FTR	Kawasaki	MGP13	77	(Spain) Javier del Amor	6
(Spain) Avintia Blusens	FTR	Kawasaki	MGP13	22	(Spain) Iván Silva	7
(Spain) Avintia Blusens	FTR	Kawasaki	MGP13	8	(Spain) Héctor Barberá	All
(Italy) Go&Fun Honda Gresini	FTR Honda	Honda	MGP13	67	(Australia) Bryan Staring	All
(Italy) Came IodaRacing Project	Ioda-Suter	BMW	MMX1	9	(Italy) Danilo Petrucci	All
(Italy) Came IodaRacing Project	Ioda-Suter	BMW	MMX1	52	(Czech Republic) Lukáš Pešek	All
(Austria) Remus Racing Team	S&B Suter	BMW	MMX1	45	(Austria) Martin Bauer	11, 18

Key
Regular Rider
Wildcard Rider
Replacement Rider

All the bikes used Bridgestone tyres.

=== Team changes ===
- Cardion AB Motoracing ended its association with Ducati and switched to a CRT-spec ART-Aprilia.
- CRT teams Forward Racing, IodaRacing Project and Paul Bird Motorsport expanded their operations to include a second bike.

=== Rider changes ===
- Hiroshi Aoyama returned to MotoGP full-time after competing in just one event in 2012. He rode an FTR Moto prepared by Avintia Racing.
- Héctor Barberá left Pramac Racing at the end of the 2012 season. When his departure was confirmed in September 2012, he had not secured a ride with any other team, but confirmed his intentions to race for team competing under Claiming Rule Teams regulations.
- Claudio Corti stepped up to the MotoGP category, racing alongside Colin Edwards at Forward Racing.
- Andrea Dovizioso replaced Valentino Rossi at Ducati after spending one season as a Monster Yamaha Tech 3 semi-works rider.
- James Ellison lost his place with Paul Bird Motorsport.
- Yonny Hernández moved from Avintia Racing to Paul Bird Motorsport.
- Andrea Iannone moved up from Moto2 to MotoGP in 2013, joining Pramac Racing.
- Michael Laverty, who competed in the British Superbike Championship from 2010 until 2012 entered MotoGP with Paul Bird Motorsport.
- Marc Márquez joined the MotoGP category, racing for the Repsol Honda Team after rules preventing rookie riders from racing for factory teams were relaxed.
- Mattia Pasini returned to Moto2 in 2013, riding with Forward Racing.
- Michele Pirro lost his place at Gresini Racing.
- After two seasons racing for Ducati, Valentino Rossi returned to Yamaha.
- Iván Silva lost his place at Avintia Racing.
- Bradley Smith, who rode for Tech 3 in the Moto2 category in the 2010 and 2011 seasons was promoted to the team's MotoGP squad, Monster Yamaha Tech 3.
- In July 2012, Ben Spies announced that he would leave the Yamaha Factory Racing team at the end of the 2012 season. He was later confirmed as switching to Ducati, joining Pramac Racing.
- Bryan Staring, who made occasional appearances in MotoGP, the Superbike World Championship and Supersport World Championships, entered the category full-time riding a CRT bike prepared by Gresini Racing.
- 2007 and 2011 MotoGP World Champion Casey Stoner officially announced his retirement at the French Grand Prix effective from the end of the 2012 season, returning to his native Australia to compete in the Dunlop V8 Supercar Series.
- Lukáš Pešek moved to MotoGP, with IodaRacing Project.

== Results and standings ==
=== Grands Prix ===
Round	Grand Prix	Pole position	Fastest lap	Winning rider	Winning team	Winning constructor	Report
1	Qatar motorcycle Grand Prix	(Spain) Jorge Lorenzo	(Spain) Marc Márquez	(Spain) Jorge Lorenzo	(Japan) Yamaha Factory Racing	(Japan) Yamaha	Report
2	(United States) Motorcycle Grand Prix of the Americas	(Spain) Marc Márquez	(Spain) Marc Márquez	(Spain) Marc Márquez	(Japan) Repsol Honda Team	(Japan) Honda	Report
3	(Spain) Spanish motorcycle Grand Prix	(Spain) Jorge Lorenzo	(Spain) Jorge Lorenzo	(Spain) Dani Pedrosa	(Japan) Repsol Honda Team	(Japan) Honda	Report
4	(France) French motorcycle Grand Prix	(Spain) Marc Márquez	(Spain) Dani Pedrosa	(Spain) Dani Pedrosa	(Japan) Repsol Honda Team	(Japan) Honda	Report
5	(Italy) Italian motorcycle Grand Prix	(Spain) Dani Pedrosa	(Spain) Marc Márquez	(Spain) Jorge Lorenzo	(Japan) Yamaha Factory Racing	(Japan) Yamaha	Report
6	(Catalonia) Catalan motorcycle Grand Prix	(Spain) Dani Pedrosa	(Spain) Marc Márquez	(Spain) Jorge Lorenzo	(Japan) Yamaha Factory Racing	(Japan) Yamaha	Report
7	(Netherlands) Dutch TT	(United Kingdom) Cal Crutchlow	(Italy) Valentino Rossi	(Italy) Valentino Rossi	(Japan) Yamaha Factory Racing	(Japan) Yamaha	Report
8	(Germany) German motorcycle Grand Prix	(Spain) Marc Márquez	(Spain) Marc Márquez	(Spain) Marc Márquez	(Japan) Repsol Honda Team	(Japan) Honda	Report
9	United States motorcycle Grand Prix	(Germany) Stefan Bradl	(Spain) Marc Márquez	(Spain) Marc Márquez	(Japan) Repsol Honda Team	(Japan) Honda	Report
10	(United States) Indianapolis motorcycle Grand Prix	(Spain) Marc Márquez	(Spain) Marc Márquez	(Spain) Marc Márquez	(Japan) Repsol Honda Team	(Japan) Honda	Report
11	Czech Republic motorcycle Grand Prix	(United Kingdom) Cal Crutchlow	(Spain) Marc Márquez	(Spain) Marc Márquez	(Japan) Repsol Honda Team	(Japan) Honda	Report
12	(United Kingdom) British motorcycle Grand Prix	(Spain) Marc Márquez	(Spain) Dani Pedrosa	(Spain) Jorge Lorenzo	(Japan) Yamaha Factory Racing	(Japan) Yamaha	Report
13	San Marino and Rimini Riviera motorcycle Grand Prix	(Spain) Marc Márquez	(Spain) Marc Márquez	(Spain) Jorge Lorenzo	(Japan) Yamaha Factory Racing	(Japan) Yamaha	Report
14	Aragon motorcycle Grand Prix	(Spain) Marc Márquez	(Spain) Dani Pedrosa	(Spain) Marc Márquez	(Japan) Repsol Honda Team	(Japan) Honda	Report
15	(Malaysia) Malaysian motorcycle Grand Prix	(Spain) Marc Márquez	(Spain) Marc Márquez	(Spain) Dani Pedrosa	(Japan) Repsol Honda Team	(Japan) Honda	Report
16	(Australia) Australian motorcycle Grand Prix	(Spain) Jorge Lorenzo	(Spain) Marc Márquez	(Spain) Jorge Lorenzo	(Japan) Yamaha Factory Racing	(Japan) Yamaha	Report
17	(Japan) Japanese motorcycle Grand Prix	(Spain) Jorge Lorenzo	(Spain) Jorge Lorenzo	(Spain) Jorge Lorenzo	(Japan) Yamaha Factory Racing	(Japan) Yamaha	Report
18	Valencian Community motorcycle Grand Prix	(Spain) Marc Márquez	(Spain) Dani Pedrosa	(Spain) Jorge Lorenzo	(Japan) Yamaha Factory Racing	(Japan) Yamaha	Report

=== Riders' standings ===
Scoring system

Points were awarded to the top fifteen finishers. A rider had to finish the race to earn points.

Position	**1st**	**2nd**	**3rd**	**4th**	**5th**	**6th**	**7th**	**8th**	**9th**	**10th**	**11th**	**12th**	**13th**	**14th**	**15th**
Points	25	20	16	13	11	10	9	8	7	6	5	4	3	2	1

Pos	Rider	Bike		Team	QAT (Qatar)	AME (United States)	SPA (Spain)	FRA (France)	ITA (Italy)	CAT (Catalonia)	NED (Netherlands)	GER (Germany)	USA (United States)	INP (Indianapolis)	CZE (Czech Republic)	GBR (United Kingdom)	RSM (San Marino)	ARA (Aragon)	MAL (Malaysia)	AUS (Australia)	JPN (Japan)	VAL (Valencian Community)	Pts
1	(Spain) Marc Márquez	Honda		Repsol Honda Team	3	**1**	2	**3**	Ret	3	2	**1**	1	**1**	1	**2**	**2**	**1**	**2**	DSQ	2	**3**	334
2	(Spain) Jorge Lorenzo	Yamaha		Yamaha Factory Racing	**1**	3	**3**	7	1	1	5	DNS	6	3	3	1	1	2	3	**1**	**1**	1	330
3	(Spain) Dani Pedrosa	Honda		Repsol Honda Team	4	2	1	1	**2**	**2**	4	DNS	5	2	2	3	3	Ret	1	2	3	2	300
4	(Italy) Valentino Rossi	Yamaha		Yamaha Factory Racing	2	6	4	12	Ret	4	1	3	3	4	4	4	4	3	4	3	6	4	237
5	(United Kingdom) Cal Crutchlow	Yamaha		Monster Yamaha Tech 3	5	4	5	2	3	Ret	**3**	2	7	5	**17**	7	6	6	6	4	7	Ret	188
6	(Spain) Álvaro Bautista	Honda		Go&Fun Honda Gresini	6	8	6	6	Ret	Ret	7	5	4	6	5	5	7	4	5	5	4	5	171
7	(Germany) Stefan Bradl	Honda		LCR Honda MotoGP	Ret	5	Ret	10	4	5	6	4	**2**	7	6	6	5	5	DNS	DNS	5	6	156
8	(Italy) Andrea Dovizioso	Ducati		Ducati Team	7	7	8	4	5	7	10	7	9	10	7	Ret	8	8	8	9	10	9	140
9	(United States) Nicky Hayden	Ducati		Ducati Team	8	9	7	5	6	Ret	11	9	8	9	8	8	9	9	Ret	7	9	8	126
10	(United Kingdom) Bradley Smith	Yamaha		Monster Yamaha Tech 3	Ret	12	10	9	9	6	9	6	Ret	8	Ret	9	11	7	7	6	8	7	116
11	(Spain) Aleix Espargaró	ART	CRT	Power Electronics Aspar	11	11	9	13	8	8	8	8	Ret	12	10	10	13	11	9	11	Ret	11	93
12	(Italy) Andrea Iannone	Ducati		Energy T.I. Pramac Racing	9	10	Ret	11	13	Ret	13	DNS		11	9	11	Ret	10	Ret	8	14	Ret	57
13	(Italy) Michele Pirro	Ducati		Ducati Test Team			11		7													10	56
13	(Italy) Michele Pirro	Ducati		Ignite Pramac Racing				8		10	14	10			12	12	10						56
14	(United States) Colin Edwards	FTR Kawasaki	CRT	NGM Mobile Forward Racing	Ret	Ret	15	16	14	9	17	13	12	13	11	14	12	16	15	12	12	15	41
15	(France) Randy de Puniet	ART	CRT	Power Electronics Aspar	12	14	Ret	Ret	11	Ret	12	12	Ret	Ret	15	16	17	13	12	10	13	Ret	36
16	(Spain) Héctor Barberá	FTR	CRT	Avintia Blusens	13	18	12	18	10	Ret	20	11	10	16	Ret	13	Ret	Ret	14	14	16	12	35
17	(Italy) Danilo Petrucci	Ioda-Suter	CRT	Came IodaRacing Project	Ret	Ret	14	14	12	11	16	14	13	17	13	15	15	Ret	16	15	18	14	26
18	(Colombia) Yonny Hernández	ART	CRT	Paul Bird Motorsport	14	15	Ret	Ret	16	13	19	Ret	15	Ret	16	20	Ret						21
18	(Colombia) Yonny Hernández	Ducati		Ignite Pramac Racing														12	10	13	15	Ret	21
19	(Italy) Claudio Corti	FTR Kawasaki	CRT	NGM Mobile Forward Racing	16	19	17	Ret	Ret	12	18	15	Ret	14	Ret	17	16	15	13	17	20	13	14
20	(Japan) Hiroshi Aoyama	FTR	CRT	Avintia Blusens	15	17	18	19	Ret	WD		17	16	15	14	18	14	14	11	20	17	16	13
21	(United States) Ben Spies	Ducati		Ignite Pramac Racing	10	13			DNS					DNS									9
22	(Japan) Katsuyuki Nakasuga	Yamaha		Yamaha YSP Racing Team																	11		5
23	(San Marino) Alex de Angelis	Ducati		Ignite Pramac Racing									11										5
24	(Czech Republic) Karel Abraham	ART	CRT	Cardion AB Motoracing	Ret	DNS	DNS	15	15	Ret	15	18	14	DNS	19		Ret						5
25	(United Kingdom) Michael Laverty	PBM	CRT	Paul Bird Motorsport	17	16	13	17	17	Ret	22	16	Ret	18	18	19	18						3
25	(United Kingdom) Michael Laverty	ART	CRT	Paul Bird Motorsport														Ret	Ret	18	19	17	3
26	(Australia) Bryan Staring	FTR Honda	CRT	Go&Fun Honda Gresini	Ret	20	16	Ret	18	14	21	Ret	17	19	20	21	Ret	18	18	DSQ	22	19	2
27	(Spain) Javier del Amor	FTR	CRT	Avintia Blusens						15													1
	(Italy) Luca Scassa	ART	CRT	Cardion AB Motoracing														17	17	16	Ret	18	0
	(Czech Republic) Lukáš Pešek	Ioda-Suter	CRT	Came IodaRacing Project	18	Ret	Ret	Ret	19	16	Ret	19	18	Ret	Ret	Ret	Ret	19	Ret	19	Ret	Ret	0
	(Austria) Martin Bauer	S&B Suter	CRT	Remus Racing Team											21							20	0
	(Australia) Damian Cudlin	PBM	CRT	Paul Bird Motorsport														Ret	Ret	21	21	Ret	0
	(United States) Blake Young	APR	CRT	Attack Performance Racing		21							WD	Ret									0
	(Spain) Iván Silva	FTR	CRT	Avintia Blusens							23												0
	(United States) Michael Barnes	BCL	CRT	GP Tech		DNQ																	0
Pos	Rider	Bike		Team	QAT (Qatar)	AME (United States)	SPA (Spain)	FRA (France)	ITA (Italy)	CAT (Catalonia)	NED (Netherlands)	GER (Germany)	USA (United States)	INP (Indianapolis)	CZE (Czech Republic)	GBR (United Kingdom)	RSM (San Marino)	ARA (Aragon)	MAL (Malaysia)	AUS (Australia)	JPN (Japan)	VAL (Valencian Community)	Pts

Colour	Result
Gold	Winner
Silver	Second place
Bronze	Third place
Green	Points classification
Blue	Non-points classification
Blue	Non-classified finish (NC)
Purple	Retired, not classified (Ret)
Red	Did not qualify (DNQ)
Red	Did not pre-qualify (DNPQ)
Black	Disqualified (DSQ)
White	Did not start (DNS)
White	Withdrew (WD)
White	Race cancelled (C)
Blank	Did not practice (DNP)
Blank	Did not arrive (DNA)
Blank	Excluded (EX)

**Bold** – Pole
Italics – Fastest Lap
Light blue – Rookie

Icon	Class
**CRT**	Claiming Rule Teams

=== Constructors' standings ===
Each constructor received the same number of points as their best placed rider in each race.

Pos	Constructor	QAT (Qatar)	AME (United States)	SPA (Spain)	FRA (France)	ITA (Italy)	CAT (Catalonia)	NED (Netherlands)	GER (Germany)	USA (United States)	INP (Indianapolis)	CZE (Czech Republic)	GBR (United Kingdom)	RSM (San Marino)	ARA (Aragon)	MAL (Malaysia)	AUS (Australia)	JPN (Japan)	VAL (Valencian Community)	Pts
1	(Japan) Honda	3	1	1	1	2	2	2	1	1	1	1	2	2	1	1	2	2	2	389
2	(Japan) Yamaha	1	3	3	2	1	1	1	2	3	3	3	1	1	2	3	1	1	1	381
3	(Italy) Ducati	7	7	7	4	5	7	10	7	8	9	7	8	8	8	8	7	9	8	155
4	(Italy) ART	11	11	9	13	8	8	8	8	14	12	10	10	13	11	9	10	13	11	99
5	(United Kingdom) FTR Kawasaki	16	19	15	16	14	9	17	13	12	13	11	14	12	15	13	12	12	13	46
6	(United Kingdom) FTR	13	17	12	18	10	15	20	11	10	15	14	13	14	14	11	14	16	12	46
7	(Italy) Ioda-Suter	18	Ret	14	14	12	11	16	14	13	17	13	15	15	19	16	15	18	14	26
8	(United Kingdom) PBM	17	16	13	17	17	Ret	22	16	Ret	18	18	19	18	Ret	Ret	21	21	Ret	3
9	(United Kingdom) FTR Honda	Ret	20	16	Ret	18	14	21	Ret	17	19	20	21	Ret	18	18	DSQ	22	19	2
	(Austria) S&B Suter											21							20	0
	(United States) APR		21							WD	Ret									0
	(Canada) BCL		DNQ																	0
Pos	Constructor	QAT (Qatar)	AME (United States)	SPA (Spain)	FRA (France)	ITA (Italy)	CAT (Catalonia)	NED (Netherlands)	GER (Germany)	USA (United States)	INP (Indianapolis)	CZE (Czech Republic)	GBR (United Kingdom)	RSM (San Marino)	ARA (Aragon)	MAL (Malaysia)	AUS (Australia)	JPN (Japan)	VAL (Valencian Community)	Pts

Notes

- ^{1} All points from the race victory for Marc Márquez were deducted as a result of a decision from Race Direction, after Márquez collided with teammate Dani Pedrosa during the race. Honda's next-best finisher was Álvaro Bautista, who scored a fourth-place finish.

=== Teams' standings ===
The teams' standings were based on results obtained by regular and substitute riders; wild-card entries were ineligible.

Pos	Team	Bike No.	QAT (Qatar)	AME (United States)	SPA (Spain)	FRA (France)	ITA (Italy)	CAT (Catalonia)	NED (Netherlands)	GER (Germany)	USA (United States)	INP (Indianapolis)	CZE (Czech Republic)	GBR (United Kingdom)	RSM (San Marino)	ARA (Aragon)	MAL (Malaysia)	AUS (Australia)	JPN (Japan)	VAL (Valencian Community)	Pts
1	(Japan) Repsol Honda Team	26	4	2	1	1	**2**	**2**	4	DNS	5	2	2	3	3	Ret	1	2	3	2	634
1	(Japan) Repsol Honda Team	93	3	**1**	2	**3**	Ret	3	2	**1**	1	**1**	1	**2**	**2**	**1**	**2**	DSQ	2	**3**	634
2	(Japan) Yamaha Factory Racing	46	2	6	4	12	Ret	4	1	3	3	4	4	4	4	3	4	3	6	4	567
2	(Japan) Yamaha Factory Racing	99	**1**	3	**3**	7	1	1	5	DNS	6	3	3	1	1	2	3	**1**	**1**	1	567
3	(France) Monster Yamaha Tech 3	35	5	4	5	2	3	Ret	**3**	2	7	5	**17**	7	6	6	6	4	7	Ret	304
3	(France) Monster Yamaha Tech 3	38	Ret	12	10	9	9	6	9	6	Ret	8	Ret	9	11	7	7	6	8	7	304
4	(Italy) Ducati Team	04	7	7	8	4	5	7	10	7	9	10	7	Ret	8	8	8	9	10	9	266
4	(Italy) Ducati Team	69	8	9	7	5	6	Ret	11	9	8	9	8	8	9	9	Ret	7	9	8	266
5	(Italy) Go&Fun Honda Gresini	19	6	8	6	6	Ret	Ret	7	5	4	6	5	5	7	4	5	5	4	5	173
5	(Italy) Go&Fun Honda Gresini	67	Ret	20	16	Ret	18	14	21	Ret	17	19	20	21	Ret	18	18	DSQ	22	19	173
6	(Monaco) LCR Honda MotoGP	6	Ret	5	Ret	10	4	5	6	4	**2**	7	6	6	5	5	DNS	DNS	5	6	156
7	(Spain) Power Electronics Aspar	14	12	14	Ret	Ret	11	Ret	12	12	Ret	Ret	15	16	17	13	12	10	13	Ret	129
7	(Spain) Power Electronics Aspar	41	11	11	9	13	8	8	8	8	Ret	12	10	10	13	11	9	11	Ret	11	129
8	(Italy) Pramac Racing	11	10	13			DNS					DNS									121
8	(Italy) Pramac Racing	15									11										121
8	(Italy) Pramac Racing	29	9	10	Ret	11	13	Ret	13	DNS		11	9	11	Ret	10	Ret	8	14	Ret	121
8	(Italy) Pramac Racing	51				8		10	14	10			12	12	10						121
8	(Italy) Pramac Racing	68														12	10	13	15	Ret	121
9	(Switzerland) NGM Mobile Forward Racing	5	Ret	Ret	15	16	14	9	17	13	12	13	11	14	12	16	15	12	12	15	55
9	(Switzerland) NGM Mobile Forward Racing	71	16	19	17	Ret	Ret	12	18	15	Ret	14	Ret	17	16	15	13	17	20	13	55
10	(Spain) Avintia Blusens	7	15	17	18	19	Ret	WD		17	16	15	14	18	14	14	11	20	17	16	49
10	(Spain) Avintia Blusens	8	13	18	12	18	10	Ret	20	11	10	16	Ret	13	Ret	Ret	14	14	16	12	49
10	(Spain) Avintia Blusens	22							23												49
10	(Spain) Avintia Blusens	77						15													49
11	(Italy) Came IodaRacing Project	9	Ret	Ret	14	14	12	11	16	14	13	17	13	15	15	Ret	16	15	18	14	26
11	(Italy) Came IodaRacing Project	52	18	Ret	Ret	Ret	19	16	Ret	19	18	Ret	Ret	Ret	Ret	19	Ret	19	Ret	Ret	26
12	(United Kingdom) Paul Bird Motorsport	50														Ret	Ret	21	21	Ret	10
12	(United Kingdom) Paul Bird Motorsport	68	14	15	Ret	Ret	16	13	19	Ret	15	Ret	16	20	Ret						10
12	(United Kingdom) Paul Bird Motorsport	70	17	16	13	17	17	Ret	22	16	Ret	18	18	19	18	Ret	Ret	18	19	17	10
13	(Czech Republic) Cardion AB Motoracing	17	Ret	DNS	DNS	15	15	Ret	15	18	14	DNS	19		Ret						5
13	(Czech Republic) Cardion AB Motoracing	23														17	17	16	Ret	18	5
Pos	Team	Bike No.	QAT (Qatar)	AME (United States)	SPA (Spain)	FRA (France)	ITA (Italy)	CAT (Catalonia)	NED (Netherlands)	GER (Germany)	USA (United States)	INP (Indianapolis)	CZE (Czech Republic)	GBR (United Kingdom)	RSM (San Marino)	ARA (Aragon)	MAL (Malaysia)	AUS (Australia)	JPN (Japan)	VAL (Valencian Community)	Pts
