= 2013 United States motorcycle Grand Prix =

2013 United States Grand Prix
Race details
- Race 9 of 18 races in the 2013 Grand Prix motorcycle racing season
- Date: July 21, 2013
- Official name: Red Bull U.S. Grand Prix
- Location: Mazda Raceway Laguna Seca
- Course: Permanent racing facility; 3.610 km (2.243 mi)

MotoGP
Pole position
Rider	(Germany) Stefan Bradl	Honda
Time	1:21.176	
Fastest lap
Rider	(Spain) Marc Márquez	Honda
Time	1:21.539 on lap 5	
Podium
First	(Spain) Marc Márquez	Honda
Second	(Germany) Stefan Bradl	Honda
Third	(Italy) Valentino Rossi	Yamaha

The 2013 United States motorcycle Grand Prix was the ninth round of the 2013 Grand Prix motorcycle racing season, and the second of three races in the 2013 season to take place in the United States of America. It was held on July 21, 2013 at the Mazda Raceway Laguna Seca in Monterey, California. Like always, only a MotoGP class race was held at Laguna Seca.

Stefan Bradl took pole position, recording his first pole position in MotoGP. At the famous corkscrew turn on lap 4 Marc Márquez, having had a faster run out of the previous corner, ran around the outside of Valentino Rossi coming into the corkscrew and was run wide by Rossi mid-corner. Márquez replicated the overtake that Rossi made on Casey Stoner at the same corner in 2008 to pass the Italian and gave chase to Bradl. The gap closed quickly at first but Márquez followed Bradl until lap 19 when he made a pass into the last corner, with the gap gradually extending in Márquez' favour over the next few laps, the Spaniard eventually winning his 3rd GP of the year to extend his championship lead to 16 points over Dani Pedrosa. The win also marked the beating of another of Freddie Spencer's records as Márquez became the youngest rider to win back to back races in the Premier Class of GP racing and the first/only rookie to win at Mazda Raceway Laguna Seca. This was the last MotoGP race to take place at Laguna Seca, which was then replaced by the Autódromo Termas de Río Hondo in 2014 in Termas de Río Hondo, Argentina. Bradl finished in second place, recorded his first podium in MotoGP and Rossi finished in third place.

== Classification ==
=== MotoGP ===
Pos.	No.	Rider	Team	Manufacturer	Laps	Time/Retired	Grid	Points
1	93	(Spain) Marc Márquez	Repsol Honda Team	Honda	32	44:00.695	2	25
2	6	(Germany) Stefan Bradl	LCR Honda MotoGP	Honda	32	+2.298	1	20
3	46	(Italy) Valentino Rossi	Yamaha Factory Racing	Yamaha	32	+4.498	4	16
4	19	(Spain) Álvaro Bautista	Go&Fun Honda Gresini	Honda	32	+4.557	3	13
5	26	(Spain) Dani Pedrosa	Repsol Honda Team	Honda	32	+9.257	7	11
6	99	(Spain) Jorge Lorenzo	Yamaha Factory Racing	Yamaha	32	+12.970	6	10
7	35	(United Kingdom) Cal Crutchlow	Monster Yamaha Tech 3	Yamaha	32	+15.304	5	9
8	69	(United States) Nicky Hayden	Ducati Team	Ducati	32	+33.963	10	8
9	4	(Italy) Andrea Dovizioso	Ducati Team	Ducati	32	+34.129	8	7
10	8	(Spain) Héctor Barberá	Avintia Blusens	FTR	32	+1:02.369	13	6
11	15	(San Marino) Alex de Angelis	Ignite Pramac Racing	Ducati	32	+1:02.604	14	5
12	5	(United States) Colin Edwards	NGM Mobile Forward Racing	FTR Kawasaki	32	+1:03.593	15	4
13	9	(Italy) Danilo Petrucci	Came IodaRacing Project	Ioda-Suter	32	+1:20.420	16	3
14	17	(Czech Republic) Karel Abraham	Cardion AB Motoracing	ART	31	+1 lap	19	2
15	68	(Colombia) Yonny Hernández	Paul Bird Motorsport	ART	31	+1 lap	18	1
16	7	(Japan) Hiroshi Aoyama	Avintia Blusens	FTR	31	+1 lap	21	
17	67	(Australia) Bryan Staring	Go&Fun Honda Gresini	FTR Honda	31	+1 lap	22	
18	52	(Czech Republic) Lukáš Pešek	Came IodaRacing Project	Ioda-Suter	31	+1 lap	23	
Ret	38	(United Kingdom) Bradley Smith	Monster Yamaha Tech 3	Yamaha	7	Mechanical	9	
Ret	41	(Spain) Aleix Espargaró	Power Electronics Aspar	ART	5	Accident	11	
Ret	14	(France) Randy de Puniet	Power Electronics Aspar	ART	4	Engine	12	
Ret	71	(Italy) Claudio Corti	NGM Mobile Forward Racing	FTR Kawasaki	3	Mechanical	17	
Ret	70	(United Kingdom) Michael Laverty	Paul Bird Motorsport	PBM	1	Accident	20	
WD	79	(United States) Blake Young	Attack Performance Racing	APR		Bike damaged		

== Championship standings after the race (MotoGP) ==
Below are the standings for the top five riders and constructors after round nine has concluded.

Riders' Championship standings

Pos.	Rider	Points
1	(Spain) Marc Márquez	163
2	(Spain) Dani Pedrosa	147
3	(Spain) Jorge Lorenzo	137
4	(Italy) Valentino Rossi	117
5	(United Kingdom) Cal Crutchlow	116

Constructors' Championship standings

Pos.	Constructor	Points
1	(Japan) Honda	201
2	(Japan) Yamaha	188
3	(Italy) Ducati	83
4	(Italy) ART	54
5	(United Kingdom) FTR	25

- Note: Only the top five positions are included for both sets of standings.

Previous race: 2013 German Grand Prix	FIM Grand Prix World Championship; 2013 season	Next race: 2013 Indianapolis Grand Prix
Previous race: 2012 United States Grand Prix	United States motorcycle Grand Prix	Next race: 2026 United States Grand Prix
