= 2013 Catalan motorcycle Grand Prix =

(Catalonia) 2013 Catalan Grand Prix
Race details
- Race 6 of 18 races in the 2013 Grand Prix motorcycle racing season
- Date: 16 June 2013
- Official name: Gran Premi Aperol de Catalunya
- Location: Circuit de Catalunya
- Course: Permanent racing facility; 4.727 km (2.937 mi)

MotoGP
Pole position
Rider	(Spain) Dani Pedrosa	Honda
Time	1:40.893	
Fastest lap
Rider	(Spain) Marc Márquez	Honda
Time	1:42.552 on lap 3	
Podium
First	(Spain) Jorge Lorenzo	Yamaha
Second	(Spain) Dani Pedrosa	Honda
Third	(Spain) Marc Márquez	Honda

Moto2
Pole position
Rider	(Spain) Pol Espargaró	Kalex
Time	1:46.410	
Fastest lap
Rider	(Switzerland) Thomas Lüthi	Suter
Time	1:46.960 on lap 5	
Podium
First	(Spain) Pol Espargaró	Kalex
Second	(Spain) Esteve Rabat	Kalex
Third	(Switzerland) Thomas Lüthi	Suter

Moto3
Pole position
Rider	(Spain) Luis Salom	KTM
Time	1:50.782	
Fastest lap
Rider	(Spain) Maverick Viñales	KTM
Time	1:51.475 on lap 20	
Podium
First	(Spain) Luis Salom	KTM
Second	(Spain) Álex Rins	KTM
Third	(Spain) Maverick Viñales	KTM

The 2013 Catalan motorcycle Grand Prix was the sixth round of the 2013 MotoGP season. It was held at the Circuit de Catalunya in Montmeló on 16 June 2013.

== Report ==
Dani Pedrosa took his second consecutive MotoGP pole position ahead of Cal Crutchlow and Jorge Lorenzo. Pedrosa set a new circuit record for MotoGP with a 1:40.893, which beat his former teammate Casey Stoner's record of 1:41.186 set in 2008. Lorenzo went on to win the race, ahead of pole sitter Pedrosa, and Marc Márquez. Valentino Rossi finished in fourth place, after the collision with Álvaro Bautista in Italy. Javier del Amor scored a point in his only MotoGP start, being called up as a last minute replacement for Hiroshi Aoyama.

Turn 10, a right hander after the back straight, had caught out many riders due to the hot temperatures on race day and caused many retirements during the first few laps of the race.

In Moto2, Pol Espargaró took pole position, and went on to win the race, ahead of Esteve Rabat and Switzerland's Thomas Lüthi, who took his first podium of the season.

In Moto3, Luis Salom took his second successive victory from pole position, ahead of Álex Rins and Maverick Viñales.

== Classification ==
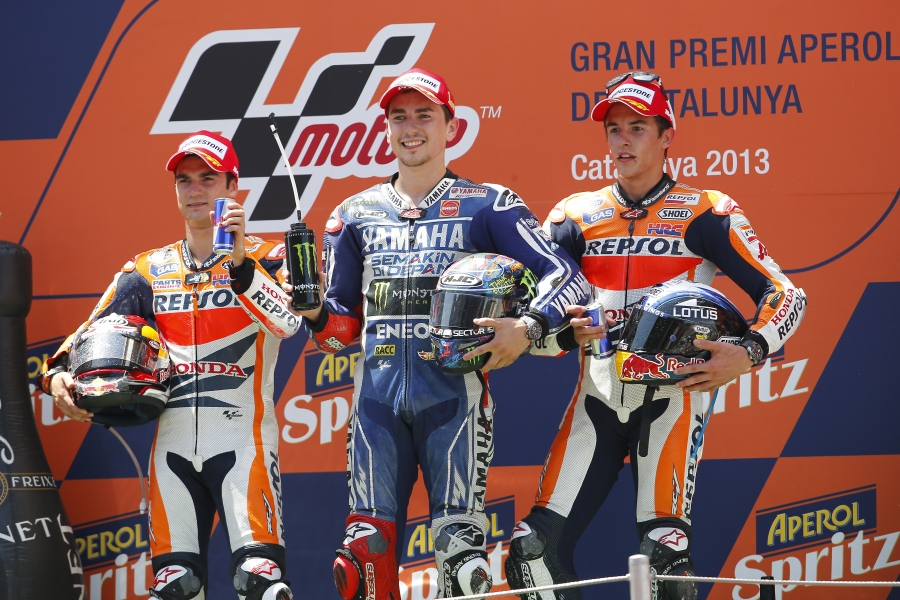
Dani Pedrosa, Jorge Lorenzo and Marc Márquez, celebrating on the podium after finishing in second, first and third in the MotoGP race.

=== MotoGP ===
Hiroshi Aoyama was replaced by Javier del Amor after the third practice session.

Pos.	No.	Rider	Team	Manufacturer	Laps	Time/Retired	Grid	Points
1	99	(Spain) Jorge Lorenzo	Yamaha Factory Racing	Yamaha	25	43:06.479	3	25
2	26	(Spain) Dani Pedrosa	Repsol Honda Team	Honda	25	+1.763	1	20
3	93	(Spain) Marc Márquez	Repsol Honda Team	Honda	25	+1.826	6	16
4	46	(Italy) Valentino Rossi	Yamaha Factory Racing	Yamaha	25	+5.874	7	13
5	6	(Germany) Stefan Bradl	LCR Honda MotoGP	Honda	25	+26.756	10	11
6	38	(United Kingdom) Bradley Smith	Monster Yamaha Tech 3	Yamaha	25	+32.228	11	10
7	4	(Italy) Andrea Dovizioso	Ducati Team	Ducati	25	+32.692	9	9
8	41	(Spain) Aleix Espargaró	Power Electronics Aspar	ART	25	+58.615	12	8
9	5	(United States) Colin Edwards	NGM Mobile Forward Racing	FTR Kawasaki	25	+1:03.142	16	7
10	51	(Italy) Michele Pirro	Ignite Pramac Racing	Ducati	25	+1:09.774	14	6
11	9	(Italy) Danilo Petrucci	Came IodaRacing Project	Ioda-Suter	25	+1:24.377	18	5
12	71	(Italy) Claudio Corti	NGM Mobile Forward Racing	FTR Kawasaki	25	+1:33.679	19	4
13	68	(Colombia) Yonny Hernández	Paul Bird Motorsport	ART	25	+1:45.355	21	3
14	67	(Australia) Bryan Staring	Go&Fun Honda Gresini	FTR Honda	25	+1:50.745	22	2
15	77	(Spain) Javier del Amor	Avintia Blusens	FTR	24	+1 lap	24	1
16	52	(Czech Republic) Lukáš Pešek	Came IodaRacing Project	Ioda-Suter	24	+1 lap	23	
Ret	8	(Spain) Héctor Barberá	Avintia Blusens	FTR	15	Accident	15	
Ret	17	(Czech Republic) Karel Abraham	Cardion AB Motoracing	ART	10	Engine	17	
Ret	35	(United Kingdom) Cal Crutchlow	Monster Yamaha Tech 3	Yamaha	5	Accident	2	
Ret	69	(United States) Nicky Hayden	Ducati Team	Ducati	5	Accident	5	
Ret	29	(Italy) Andrea Iannone	Energy T.I. Pramac Racing	Ducati	4	Accident	8	
Ret	14	(France) Randy de Puniet	Power Electronics Aspar	ART	1	Engine	13	
Ret	19	(Spain) Álvaro Bautista	Go&Fun Honda Gresini	Honda	0	Accident	4	
Ret	70	(United Kingdom) Michael Laverty	Paul Bird Motorsport	PBM	0	Accident	20	

=== Moto2 ===
Pos	No	Rider	Manufacturer	Laps	Time	Grid	Points
1	40	(Spain) Pol Espargaró	Kalex	23	41:17.307	1	25
2	80	(Spain) Esteve Rabat	Kalex	23	+0.081	3	20
3	12	(Switzerland) Thomas Lüthi	Suter	23	+6.264	10	16
4	45	(United Kingdom) Scott Redding	Kalex	23	+9.061	2	13
5	30	(Japan) Takaaki Nakagami	Kalex	23	+10.597	4	11
6	4	(Switzerland) Randy Krummenacher	Suter	23	+11.577	8	10
7	5	(France) Johann Zarco	Suter	23	+15.569	6	9
8	77	(Switzerland) Dominique Aegerter	Suter	23	+28.280	14	8
9	36	(Finland) Mika Kallio	Kalex	23	+28.352	12	7
10	3	(Italy) Simone Corsi	Speed Up	23	+28.461	15	6
11	54	(Italy) Mattia Pasini	Speed Up	23	+28.892	11	5
12	63	(France) Mike Di Meglio	Motobi	23	+31.215	24	4
13	52	(United Kingdom) Danny Kent	Tech 3	23	+31.318	17	3
14	49	(Spain) Axel Pons	Kalex	23	+31.757	29	2
15	60	(Spain) Julián Simón	Kalex	23	+33.190	16	1
16	18	(Spain) Nicolás Terol	Suter	23	+34.092	20	
17	9	(United Kingdom) Kyle Smith	Kalex	23	+44.392	18	
18	55	(Malaysia) Hafizh Syahrin	Kalex	23	+48.517	27	
19	27	(Spain) Dani Rivas	Kalex	23	+48.563	32	
20	72	(Japan) Yuki Takahashi	Moriwaki	23	+48.719	22	
21	17	(Spain) Alberto Moncayo	Speed Up	23	+53.765	31	
22	7	(Indonesia) Doni Tata Pradita	Suter	23	+1:13.330	33	
23	88	(Spain) Ricard Cardús	Speed Up	23	+1:21.740	26	
Ret	14	(Thailand) Ratthapark Wilairot	Suter	22	Accident	28	
DSQ	95	(Australia) Anthony West	Speed Up	18	(Retirement)	25	
Ret	81	(Spain) Jordi Torres	Suter	17	Accident	7	
Ret	23	(Germany) Marcel Schrötter	Kalex	17	Retirement	13	
Ret	97	(Indonesia) Rafid Topan Sucipto	Speed Up	9	Accident	34	
Ret	11	(Germany) Sandro Cortese	Kalex	7	Retirement	9	
Ret	15	(San Marino) Alex de Angelis	Speed Up	7	Retirement	5	
Ret	19	(Belgium) Xavier Siméon	Kalex	2	Accident	19	
Ret	24	(Spain) Toni Elías	Kalex	1	Retirement	21	
Ret	96	(France) Louis Rossi	Tech 3	0	Accident	23	
Ret	44	(South Africa) Steven Odendaal	Speed Up	0	Accident	30	
OFFICIAL MOTO2 REPORT

=== Moto3 ===
Pos	No	Rider	Manufacturer	Laps	Time/Retired	Grid	Points
1	39	(Spain) Luis Salom	KTM	22	41:15.331	1	25
2	42	(Spain) Álex Rins	KTM	22	+0.211	2	20
3	25	(Spain) Maverick Viñales	KTM	22	+0.634	5	16
4	12	(Spain) Álex Márquez	KTM	22	+3.993	4	13
5	7	(Spain) Efrén Vázquez	Mahindra	22	+6.243	6	11
6	44	(Portugal) Miguel Oliveira	Mahindra	22	+9.295	3	10
7	8	(Australia) Jack Miller	FTR Honda	22	+13.164	8	9
8	10	(France) Alexis Masbou	FTR Honda	22	+21.174	10	8
9	63	(Malaysia) Zulfahmi Khairuddin	KTM	22	+21.240	16	7
10	61	(Australia) Arthur Sissis	KTM	22	+21.598	11	6
11	32	(Spain) Isaac Viñales	FTR Honda	22	+21.726	7	5
12	41	(South Africa) Brad Binder	Suter Honda	22	+21.756	12	4
13	89	(France) Alan Techer	TSR Honda	22	+21.828	15	3
14	99	(United Kingdom) Danny Webb	Suter Honda	22	+21.879	21	2
15	5	(Italy) Romano Fenati	FTR Honda	22	+22.071	22	1
16	19	(Italy) Alessandro Tonucci	FTR Honda	22	+22.218	14	
17	4	(Italy) Francesco Bagnaia	FTR Honda	22	+28.119	32	
18	65	(Germany) Philipp Öttl	Kalex KTM	22	+34.915	27	
19	17	(United Kingdom) John McPhee	FTR Honda	22	+34.948	20	
20	58	(Spain) Juan Francisco Guevara	TSR Honda	22	+35.026	24	
21	77	(Italy) Lorenzo Baldassarri	FTR Honda	22	+35.110	18	
22	22	(Spain) Ana Carrasco	KTM	22	+35.352	28	
23	29	(Japan) Hyuga Watanabe	FTR Honda	22	+46.632	29	
24	3	(Italy) Matteo Ferrari	FTR Honda	22	+46.733	30	
25	16	(Italy) Andrea Migno	FTR	22	+46.776	31	
26	57	(Brazil) Eric Granado	Kalex KTM	22	+1:12.896	25	
27	86	(Germany) Kevin Hanus	Honda	22	+1:29.331	33	
Ret	84	(Czech Republic) Jakub Kornfeil	Kalex KTM	12	Retirement	17	
Ret	11	(Belgium) Livio Loi	Kalex KTM	4	Accident	13	
Ret	23	(Italy) Niccolò Antonelli	FTR Honda	3	Accident	9	
Ret	9	(Germany) Toni Finsterbusch	Kalex KTM	0	Accident	19	
Ret	31	(Finland) Niklas Ajo	KTM	0	Accident	23	
Ret	53	(Netherlands) Jasper Iwema	Kalex KTM	0	Accident	26	
DNS	66	(Germany) Florian Alt	Kalex KTM		Did not start		
DNS	94	(Germany) Jonas Folger	Kalex KTM		Did not start		
OFFICIAL MOTO3 REPORT

== Championship standings after the race (MotoGP) ==
Below are the standings for the top five riders and constructors after round six has concluded.

Riders' Championship standings

Pos.	Rider	Points
1	(Spain) Dani Pedrosa	123
2	(Spain) Jorge Lorenzo	116
3	(Spain) Marc Márquez	93
4	(United Kingdom) Cal Crutchlow	71
5	(Italy) Valentino Rossi	60

Constructors' Championship standings

Pos.	Constructor	Points
1	(Japan) Honda	131
2	(Japan) Yamaha	127
3	(Italy) Ducati	60
4	(Italy) ART	36
5	(United Kingdom) FTR	14

- Note: Only the top five positions are included for both sets of standings.

Previous race: 2013 Italian Grand Prix	FIM Grand Prix World Championship; 2013 season	Next race: 2013 Dutch TT
Previous race: 2012 Catalan Grand Prix	Catalan motorcycle Grand Prix	Next race: 2014 Catalan Grand Prix
