= 2013 Qatar motorcycle Grand Prix =

2013 Qatar Grand Prix
Race details
- Race 1 of 18 races in the 2013 Grand Prix motorcycle racing season
- Date: 7 April 2013
- Official name: Commercial Bank Grand Prix of Qatar
- Location: Losail International Circuit
- Course: Permanent racing facility; 5.380 km (3.343 mi)

MotoGP
Pole position
Rider	(Spain) Jorge Lorenzo	Yamaha
Time	1:54.714	
Fastest lap
Rider	(Spain) Marc Márquez	Honda
Time	1:55.445 on lap 3	
Podium
First	(Spain) Jorge Lorenzo	Yamaha
Second	(Italy) Valentino Rossi	Yamaha
Third	(Spain) Marc Márquez	Honda

Moto2
Pole position
Rider	(Spain) Pol Espargaró	Kalex
Time	2:00.882	
Fastest lap
Rider	(Spain) Pol Espargaró	Kalex
Time	2:00.931 on lap 13	
Podium
First	(Spain) Pol Espargaró	Kalex
Second	(United Kingdom) Scott Redding	Kalex
Third	(Japan) Takaaki Nakagami	Kalex

Moto3
Pole position
Rider	(Spain) Luis Salom	KTM
Time	2:07.229	
Fastest lap
Rider	(Germany) Jonas Folger	Kalex KTM
Time	2:06.839 on lap 6	
Podium
First	(Spain) Luis Salom	KTM
Second	(Spain) Maverick Viñales	KTM
Third	(Spain) Álex Rins	KTM

The 2013 Qatar motorcycle Grand Prix was the first round of the 2013 MotoGP season. It was held at the Losail International Circuit near Doha in Qatar on 7 April 2013.

This race was both the first MotoGP start and podium for 8-time world champion Marc Márquez.

== Classification ==
=== MotoGP ===
Pos.	No.	Rider	Team	Manufacturer	Laps	Time	Grid	Points
1	99	(Spain) Jorge Lorenzo	Yamaha Factory Racing	Yamaha	22	42:39.802	1	25
2	46	(Italy) Valentino Rossi	Yamaha Factory Racing	Yamaha	22	+5.990	7	20
3	93	(Spain) Marc Márquez	Repsol Honda Team	Honda	22	+6.201	6	16
4	26	(Spain) Dani Pedrosa	Repsol Honda Team	Honda	22	+9.473	3	13
5	35	(United Kingdom) Cal Crutchlow	Monster Yamaha Tech 3	Yamaha	22	+18.764	2	11
6	19	(Spain) Álvaro Bautista	Go&Fun Honda Gresini	Honda	22	+22.148	8	10
7	4	(Italy) Andrea Dovizioso	Ducati Team	Ducati	22	+24.355	4	9
8	69	(United States) Nicky Hayden	Ducati Team	Ducati	22	+24.920	11	8
9	29	(Italy) Andrea Iannone	Energy T.I. Pramac Racing	Ducati	22	+37.124	10	7
10	11	(United States) Ben Spies	Ignite Pramac Racing	Ducati	22	+44.908	13	6
11	41	(Spain) Aleix Espargaró	Power Electronics Aspar	ART	22	+49.809	12	5
12	14	(France) Randy de Puniet	Power Electronics Aspar	ART	22	+56.495	14	4
13	8	(Spain) Héctor Barberá	Avintia Blusens	FTR	22	+1:09.599	22	3
14	68	(Colombia) Yonny Hernández	Paul Bird Motorsport	ART	22	+1:10.742	16	2
15	7	(Japan) Hiroshi Aoyama	Avintia Blusens	FTR	22	+1:13.600	17	1
16	71	(Italy) Claudio Corti	NGM Mobile Forward Racing	FTR Kawasaki	22	+1:29.444	21	
17	70	(United Kingdom) Michael Laverty	Paul Bird Motorsport	PBM	22	+1:34.341	24	
18	52	(Czech Republic) Lukáš Pešek	Came IodaRacing Project	Ioda-Suter	22	+1:34.683	15	
Ret	5	(United States) Colin Edwards	NGM Mobile Forward Racing	FTR Kawasaki	15	Retirement	19	
Ret	9	(Italy) Danilo Petrucci	Came IodaRacing Project	Ioda-Suter	12	Retirement	20	
Ret	6	(Germany) Stefan Bradl	LCR Honda MotoGP	Honda	8	Accident	5	
Ret	38	(United Kingdom) Bradley Smith	Monster Yamaha Tech 3	Yamaha	4	Accident	9	
Ret	67	(Australia) Bryan Staring	Go&Fun Honda Gresini	FTR Honda	1	Accident	23	
Ret	17	(Czech Republic) Karel Abraham	Cardion AB Motoracing	ART	0	Accident	18	

=== Moto2 ===
Pos	No	Rider	Manufacturer	Laps	Time	Grid	Points
1	40	(Spain) Pol Espargaró	Kalex	20	40:31.782	1	25
2	45	(United Kingdom) Scott Redding	Kalex	20	+0.844	4	20
3	30	(Japan) Takaaki Nakagami	Kalex	20	+12.098	2	16
4	77	(Switzerland) Dominique Aegerter	Suter	20	+18.910	5	13
5	36	(Finland) Mika Kallio	Kalex	20	+18.933	3	11
6	60	(Spain) Julián Simón	Kalex	20	+19.018	6	10
7	3	(Italy) Simone Corsi	Speed Up	20	+19.230	11	9
8	15	(San Marino) Alex de Angelis	Speed Up	20	+19.452	12	8
9	80	(Spain) Esteve Rabat	Kalex	20	+20.219	8	7
10	19	(Belgium) Xavier Siméon	Kalex	20	+20.972	17	6
11	81	(Spain) Jordi Torres	Suter	20	+21.674	16	5
12	5	(France) Johann Zarco	Suter	20	+22.084	14	4
13	23	(Germany) Marcel Schrötter	Kalex	20	+22.093	9	3
14	18	(Spain) Nicolás Terol	Suter	20	+22.496	7	2
15	24	(Spain) Toni Elías	Kalex	20	+36.677	20	1
16	63	(France) Mike Di Meglio	Motobi	20	+36.697	10	
17	11	(Germany) Sandro Cortese	Kalex	20	+41.857	13	
18	52	(United Kingdom) Danny Kent	Tech 3	20	+45.295	26	
19	4	(Switzerland) Randy Krummenacher	Suter	20	+47.673	24	
20	33	(Spain) Sergio Gadea	Suter	20	+54.197	32	
21	9	(United Kingdom) Kyle Smith	Kalex	20	+59.245	28	
22	44	(South Africa) Steven Odendaal	Speed Up	20	+1:02.713	29	
23	72	(Japan) Yuki Takahashi	Moriwaki	20	+1:04.294	23	
24	7	(Indonesia) Doni Tata Pradita	Suter	20	+1:14.017	27	
25	17	(Spain) Alberto Moncayo	Speed Up	20	+1:37.009	31	
26	97	(Indonesia) Rafid Topan Sucipto	Speed Up	19	+1 lap	30	
Ret	14	(Thailand) Ratthapark Wilairot	Suter	15	Accident	19	
Ret	88	(Spain) Ricard Cardús	Speed Up	8	Accident	18	
Ret	54	(Italy) Mattia Pasini	Speed Up	8	Retirement	25	
DSQ	95	(Australia) Anthony West	Speed Up	7	(Retirement)	15	
Ret	49	(Spain) Axel Pons	Kalex	3	Accident	21	
Ret	96	(France) Louis Rossi	Tech 3	3	Accident	22	
OFFICIAL MOTO2 REPORT

=== Moto3 ===
Pos	No	Rider	Manufacturer	Laps	Time/Retired	Grid	Points
1	39	(Spain) Luis Salom	KTM	18	38:26.859	1	25
2	25	(Spain) Maverick Viñales	KTM	18	+0.417	2	20
3	42	(Spain) Álex Rins	KTM	18	+0.423	3	16
4	12	(Spain) Álex Márquez	KTM	18	+0.701	9	13
5	94	(Germany) Jonas Folger	Kalex KTM	18	+0.916	4	11
6	63	(Malaysia) Zulfahmi Khairuddin	KTM	18	+17.489	11	10
7	44	(Portugal) Miguel Oliveira	Mahindra	18	+17.566	5	9
8	61	(Australia) Arthur Sissis	KTM	18	+19.355	10	8
9	31	(Finland) Niklas Ajo	KTM	18	+28.966	16	7
10	7	(Spain) Efrén Vázquez	Mahindra	18	+28.995	8	6
11	99	(United Kingdom) Danny Webb	Suter Honda	18	+29.440	15	5
12	41	(South Africa) Brad Binder	Suter Honda	18	+29.499	17	4
13	53	(Netherlands) Jasper Iwema	Kalex KTM	18	+39.216	18	3
14	10	(France) Alexis Masbou	FTR Honda	18	+39.415	19	2
15	5	(Italy) Romano Fenati	FTR Honda	18	+39.451	12	1
16	8	(Australia) Jack Miller	FTR Honda	18	+39.797	21	
17	65	(Germany) Philipp Öttl	Kalex KTM	18	+50.846	27	
18	19	(Italy) Alessandro Tonucci	Honda	18	+51.093	26	
19	9	(Germany) Toni Finsterbusch	Kalex KTM	18	+51.218	24	
20	22	(Spain) Ana Carrasco	KTM	18	+51.266	23	
21	58	(Spain) Juan Francisco Guevara	TSR Honda	18	+51.329	22	
22	84	(Czech Republic) Jakub Kornfeil	Kalex KTM	18	+53.745	7	
23	4	(Italy) Francesco Bagnaia	FTR Honda	18	+54.691	29	
24	3	(Italy) Matteo Ferrari	FTR Honda	18	+54.948	31	
25	66	(Germany) Florian Alt	Kalex KTM	18	+55.236	28	
26	57	(Brazil) Eric Granado	Kalex KTM	18	+1:03.601	25	
27	29	(Japan) Hyuga Watanabe	Honda	18	+1:23.040	32	
28	77	(Italy) Lorenzo Baldassarri	FTR Honda	18	+1:23.178	30	
Ret	17	(United Kingdom) John McPhee	FTR Honda	16	Accident	20	
Ret	32	(Spain) Isaac Viñales	FTR Honda	7	Retirement	13	
Ret	89	(France) Alan Techer	TSR Honda	2	Accident	6	
Ret	23	(Italy) Niccolò Antonelli	FTR Honda	0	Accident	14	
OFFICIAL MOTO3 REPORT

== Championship standings after the race (MotoGP) ==
Below are the standings for the top five riders and constructors after round one has concluded.

Riders' Championship standings

Pos.	Rider	Points
1	(Spain) Jorge Lorenzo	25
2	(Italy) Valentino Rossi	20
3	(Spain) Marc Márquez	16
4	(Spain) Dani Pedrosa	13
5	(United Kingdom) Cal Crutchlow	11

Constructors' Championship standings

Pos.	Constructor	Points
1	(Japan) Yamaha	25
2	(Japan) Honda	16
3	(Italy) Ducati	9
4	(Italy) ART	5
5	(United Kingdom) FTR	3

- Note: Only the top five positions are included for both sets of standings.

Previous race: 2012 Valencian Grand Prix	FIM Grand Prix World Championship; 2013 season	Next race: 2013 Grand Prix of the Americas
Previous race: 2012 Qatar Grand Prix	Qatar motorcycle Grand Prix	Next race: 2014 Qatar Grand Prix
