= 2013 Motorcycle Grand Prix of the Americas =

(United States) 2013 Grand Prix of the Americas
Race details
- Race 2 of 18 races in the 2013 Grand Prix motorcycle racing season
- Date: April 21, 2013
- Official name: Red Bull Grand Prix of the Americas
- Location: Circuit of the Americas
- Course: Permanent racing facility; 5.513 km (3.426 mi)

MotoGP
Pole position
Rider	(Spain) Marc Márquez	Honda
Time	2:03.021	
Fastest lap
Rider	(Spain) Marc Márquez	Honda
Time	2:04.242 on lap 3	
Podium
First	(Spain) Marc Márquez	Honda
Second	(Spain) Dani Pedrosa	Honda
Third	(Spain) Jorge Lorenzo	Yamaha

Moto2
Pole position
Rider	(United Kingdom) Scott Redding	Kalex
Time	2:10.577	
Fastest lap
Rider	(Spain) Nicolás Terol	Suter
Time	2:11.742 on lap 6	
Podium
First	(Spain) Nicolás Terol	Suter
Second	(Spain) Esteve Rabat	Kalex
Third	(Finland) Mika Kallio	Kalex

Moto3
Pole position
Rider	(Spain) Álex Rins	KTM
Time	2:16.396	
Fastest lap
Rider	(Spain) Luis Salom	KTM
Time	2:16.345 on lap 7	
Podium
First	(Spain) Álex Rins	KTM
Second	(Spain) Maverick Viñales	KTM
Third	(Spain) Luis Salom	KTM

The 2013 Grand Prix of the Americas was the second round of the 2013 MotoGP season. It was held at the Circuit of the Americas in Austin, Texas on April 21, 2013. This was the first GP race at the circuit.

Marc Márquez won his first MotoGP race, in which was only his second race in the top level, and became the youngest ever rider to win a MotoGP race.

It was the first Grand Prix since the 1982 Swedish Grand Prix where in all three categories, there were three new winners: at the Anderstorp it was Iván Palazzese (125cc), Roland Freymond (250cc) and Takazumi Katayama (500cc) who won.

== Classification ==
=== MotoGP ===
Pos.	No.	Rider	Team	Manufacturer	Laps	Time	Grid	Points
1	93	(Spain) Marc Márquez	Repsol Honda Team	Honda	21	43:42.123	1	25
2	26	(Spain) Dani Pedrosa	Repsol Honda Team	Honda	21	+1.534	2	20
3	99	(Spain) Jorge Lorenzo	Yamaha Factory Racing	Yamaha	21	+3.381	3	16
4	35	(United Kingdom) Cal Crutchlow	Monster Yamaha Tech 3	Yamaha	21	+6.616	4	13
5	6	(Germany) Stefan Bradl	LCR Honda MotoGP	Honda	21	+12.674	5	11
6	46	(Italy) Valentino Rossi	Yamaha Factory Racing	Yamaha	21	+16.615	8	10
7	4	(Italy) Andrea Dovizioso	Ducati Team	Ducati	21	+22.374	6	9
8	19	(Spain) Álvaro Bautista	Go&Fun Honda Gresini	Honda	21	+22.854	7	8
9	69	(United States) Nicky Hayden	Ducati Team	Ducati	21	+33.773	10	7
10	29	(Italy) Andrea Iannone	Energy T.I. Pramac Racing	Ducati	21	+42.112	13	6
11	41	(Spain) Aleix Espargaró	Power Electronics Aspar	ART	21	+48.837	9	5
12	38	(United Kingdom) Bradley Smith	Monster Yamaha Tech 3	Yamaha	21	+50.705	11	4
13	11	(United States) Ben Spies	Ignite Pramac Racing	Ducati	21	+1:14.132	12	3
14	14	(France) Randy de Puniet	Power Electronics Aspar	ART	21	+1:15.651	14	2
15	68	(Colombia) Yonny Hernández	Paul Bird Motorsport	ART	21	+1:19.591	16	1
16	70	(United Kingdom) Michael Laverty	Paul Bird Motorsport	PBM	21	+1:34.391	17	
17	7	(Japan) Hiroshi Aoyama	Avintia Blusens	FTR	21	+1:39.823	21	
18	8	(Spain) Héctor Barberá	Avintia Blusens	FTR	21	+1:39.952	15	
19	71	(Italy) Claudio Corti	NGM Mobile Forward Racing	FTR Kawasaki	21	+1:46.773	19	
20	67	(Australia) Bryan Staring	Go&Fun Honda Gresini	FTR Honda	21	+1:48.084	22	
21	79	(United States) Blake Young	Attack Performance Racing	APR	20	+1 lap	24	
Ret	9	(Italy) Danilo Petrucci	Came IodaRacing Project	Ioda-Suter	13	Retirement	20	
Ret	52	(Czech Republic) Lukáš Pešek	Came IodaRacing Project	Ioda-Suter	13	Accident	23	
Ret	5	(United States) Colin Edwards	NGM Mobile Forward Racing	FTR Kawasaki	11	Retirement	18	
DNS	17	(Czech Republic) Karel Abraham	Cardion AB Motoracing	ART	0	Did not start		
DNQ	44	(United States) Mike Barnes	GPTech	BCL	0	Did not qualify		

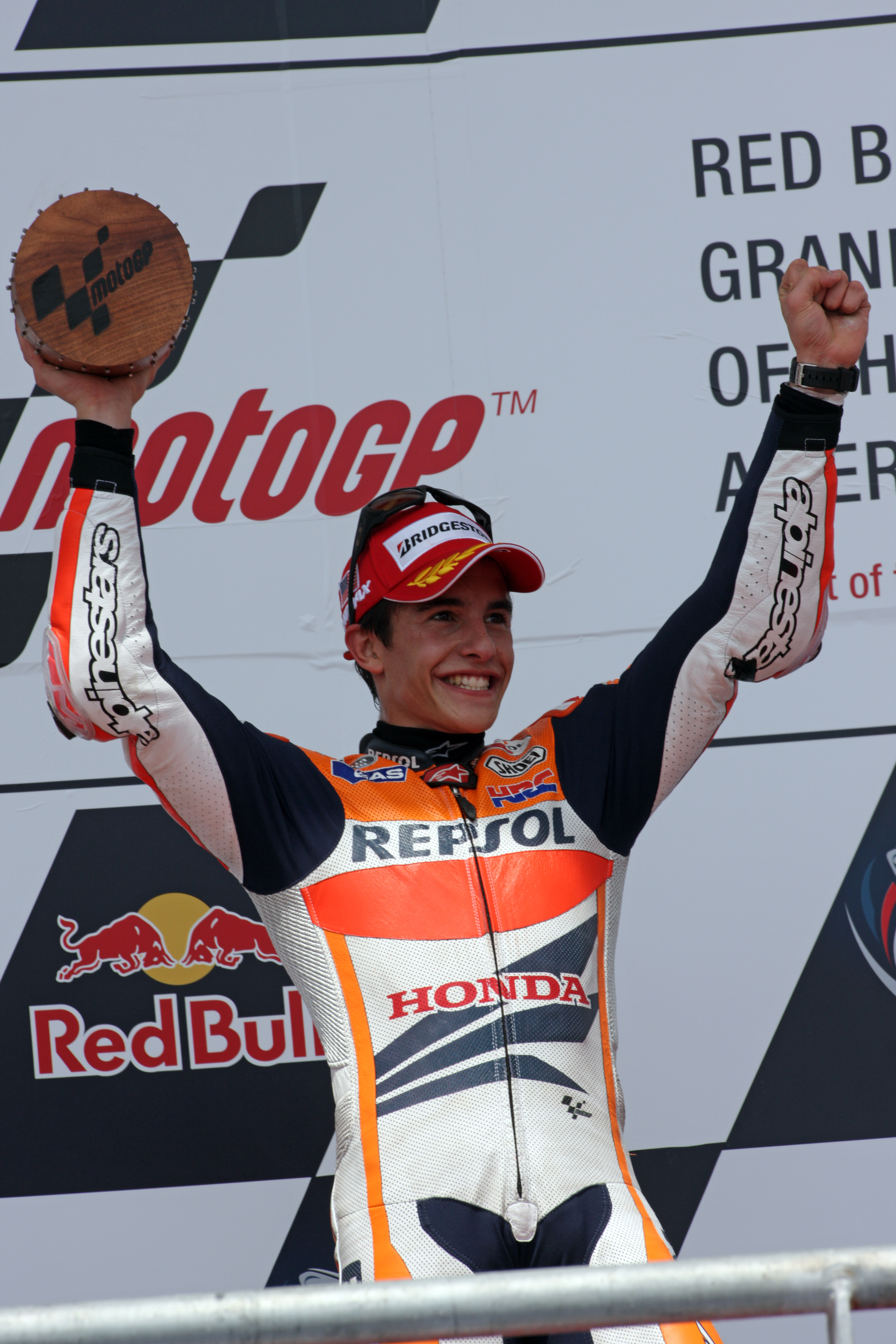
Marc Márquez, raising his first-place trophy on the podium after winning the MotoGP race.

=== Moto2 ===
Pos	No	Rider	Manufacturer	Laps	Time	Grid	Points
1	18	(Spain) Nicolás Terol	Suter	19	42:02.689	3	25
2	80	(Spain) Esteve Rabat	Kalex	19	+3.125	4	20
3	36	(Finland) Mika Kallio	Kalex	19	+3.175	9	16
4	77	(Switzerland) Dominique Aegerter	Suter	19	+4.873	5	13
5	45	(United Kingdom) Scott Redding	Kalex	19	+5.597	1	11
6	5	(France) Johann Zarco	Suter	19	+9.295	17	10
7	54	(Italy) Mattia Pasini	Speed Up	19	+14.472	24	9
8	15	(San Marino) Alex de Angelis	Speed Up	19	+16.051	25	8
9	24	(Spain) Toni Elías	Kalex	19	+19.696	16	7
10	63	(France) Mike Di Meglio	Motobi	19	+20.107	18	6
11	23	(Germany) Marcel Schrötter	Kalex	19	+23.287	14	5
12	19	(Belgium) Xavier Siméon	Kalex	19	+23.547	8	4
13	81	(Spain) Jordi Torres	Suter	19	+23.815	12	3
14	88	(Spain) Ricard Cardús	Speed Up	19	+33.488	22	2
15	3	(Italy) Simone Corsi	Speed Up	19	+35.424	6	1
16	49	(Spain) Axel Pons	Kalex	19	+35.532	21	
17	52	(United Kingdom) Danny Kent	Tech 3	19	+42.451	13	
18	72	(Japan) Yuki Takahashi	Moriwaki	19	+44.314	26	
19	60	(Spain) Julián Simón	Kalex	19	+44.688	10	
20	9	(United Kingdom) Kyle Smith	Kalex	19	+58.964	19	
21	14	(Thailand) Ratthapark Wilairot	Suter	19	+59.940	23	
22	44	(South Africa) Steven Odendaal	Speed Up	19	+1:00.107	30	
23	96	(France) Louis Rossi	Tech 3	19	+1:00.702	27	
24	7	(Indonesia) Doni Tata Pradita	Suter	19	+1:08.996	29	
25	11	(Germany) Sandro Cortese	Kalex	19	+1:24.281	20	
DSQ	95	(Australia) Anthony West	Speed Up	19	(+9.440)	11	
Ret	4	(Switzerland) Randy Krummenacher	Suter	9	Accident	15	
Ret	97	(Indonesia) Rafid Topan Sucipto	Speed Up	7	Retirement	31	
Ret	30	(Japan) Takaaki Nakagami	Kalex	6	Retirement	2	
Ret	17	(Spain) Alberto Moncayo	Speed Up	6	Retirement	28	
Ret	40	(Spain) Pol Espargaró	Kalex	3	Accident	7	
DNS	12	(Switzerland) Thomas Lüthi	Suter	0	Did not start		
OFFICIAL MOTO2 REPORT

=== Moto3 ===
Pos	No	Rider	Manufacturer	Laps	Time/Retired	Grid	Points
1	42	(Spain) Álex Rins	KTM	5	11:26.535	1	25
2	25	(Spain) Maverick Viñales	KTM	5	+0.244	3	20
3	39	(Spain) Luis Salom	KTM	5	+0.547	2	16
4	94	(Germany) Jonas Folger	Kalex KTM	5	+1.230	5	13
5	44	(Portugal) Miguel Oliveira	Mahindra	5	+8.276	18	11
6	8	(Australia) Jack Miller	FTR Honda	5	+8.603	4	10
7	63	(Malaysia) Zulfahmi Khairuddin	KTM	5	+10.147	12	9
8	10	(France) Alexis Masbou	FTR Honda	5	+12.037	9	8
9	41	(South Africa) Brad Binder	Suter Honda	5	+12.263	14	7
10	84	(Czech Republic) Jakub Kornfeil	Kalex KTM	5	+12.737	13	6
11	99	(United Kingdom) Danny Webb	Suter Honda	5	+13.221	8	5
12	61	(Australia) Arthur Sissis	KTM	5	+14.030	10	4
13	32	(Spain) Isaac Viñales	FTR Honda	5	+15.822	11	3
14	7	(Spain) Efrén Vázquez	Mahindra	5	+16.593	15	2
15	31	(Finland) Niklas Ajo	KTM	5	+21.094	7	1
16	58	(Spain) Juan Francisco Guevara	TSR Honda	5	+21.205	27	
17	65	(Germany) Philipp Öttl	Kalex KTM	5	+21.351	25	
18	19	(Italy) Alessandro Tonucci	Honda	5	+21.599	16	
19	3	(Italy) Matteo Ferrari	FTR Honda	5	+21.772	30	
20	22	(Spain) Ana Carrasco	KTM	5	+22.003	26	
21	17	(United Kingdom) John McPhee	FTR Honda	5	+23.267	28	
22	4	(Italy) Francesco Bagnaia	FTR Honda	5	+30.965	31	
23	57	(Brazil) Eric Granado	Kalex KTM	5	+31.591	20	
Ret	77	(Italy) Lorenzo Baldassarri	FTR Honda	2	Accident	29	
Ret	12	(Spain) Álex Márquez	KTM	2	Retirement	6	
Ret	9	(Germany) Toni Finsterbusch	Kalex KTM	0	Accident	22	
Ret	5	(Italy) Romano Fenati	FTR Honda	0	Did not restart	17	
Ret	53	(Netherlands) Jasper Iwema	Kalex KTM	Retired during the initial part of the race.^{1}		19	
Ret	66	(Germany) Florian Alt	Kalex KTM	Retired during the initial part of the race.^{1}		21	
Ret	23	(Italy) Niccolò Antonelli	FTR Honda	Retired during the initial part of the race.^{1}		23	
Ret	89	(France) Alan Techer	TSR Honda	Retired during the initial part of the race.^{1}		24	
DNS	29	(Japan) Hyuga Watanabe	Honda	0	Did not start		
OFFICIAL MOTO3 REPORT

Notes:

- ^1 – The Moto3 race was stopped after ten laps and restarted over a distance of five laps.

== Championship standings after the race (MotoGP) ==
Below are the standings for the top five riders and constructors after round two has concluded.

Riders' Championship standings

Pos.	Rider	Points
1	(Spain) Marc Márquez	41
2	(Spain) Jorge Lorenzo	41
3	(Spain) Dani Pedrosa	33
4	(Italy) Valentino Rossi	30
5	(United Kingdom) Cal Crutchlow	24

Constructors' Championship standings

Pos.	Constructor	Points
1	(Japan) Honda	41
2	(Japan) Yamaha	41
3	(Italy) Ducati	18
4	(Italy) ART	10
5	(United Kingdom) FTR	3

- Note: Only the top five positions are included for both sets of standings.

Previous race: 2013 Qatar Grand Prix	FIM Grand Prix World Championship; 2013 season	Next race: 2013 Spanish Grand Prix
Previous race: None	Motorcycle Grand Prix of the Americas	Next race: 2014 Grand Prix of the Americas
