= 2013 Moto2 World Championship =

4th running of the Moto2 World Championship

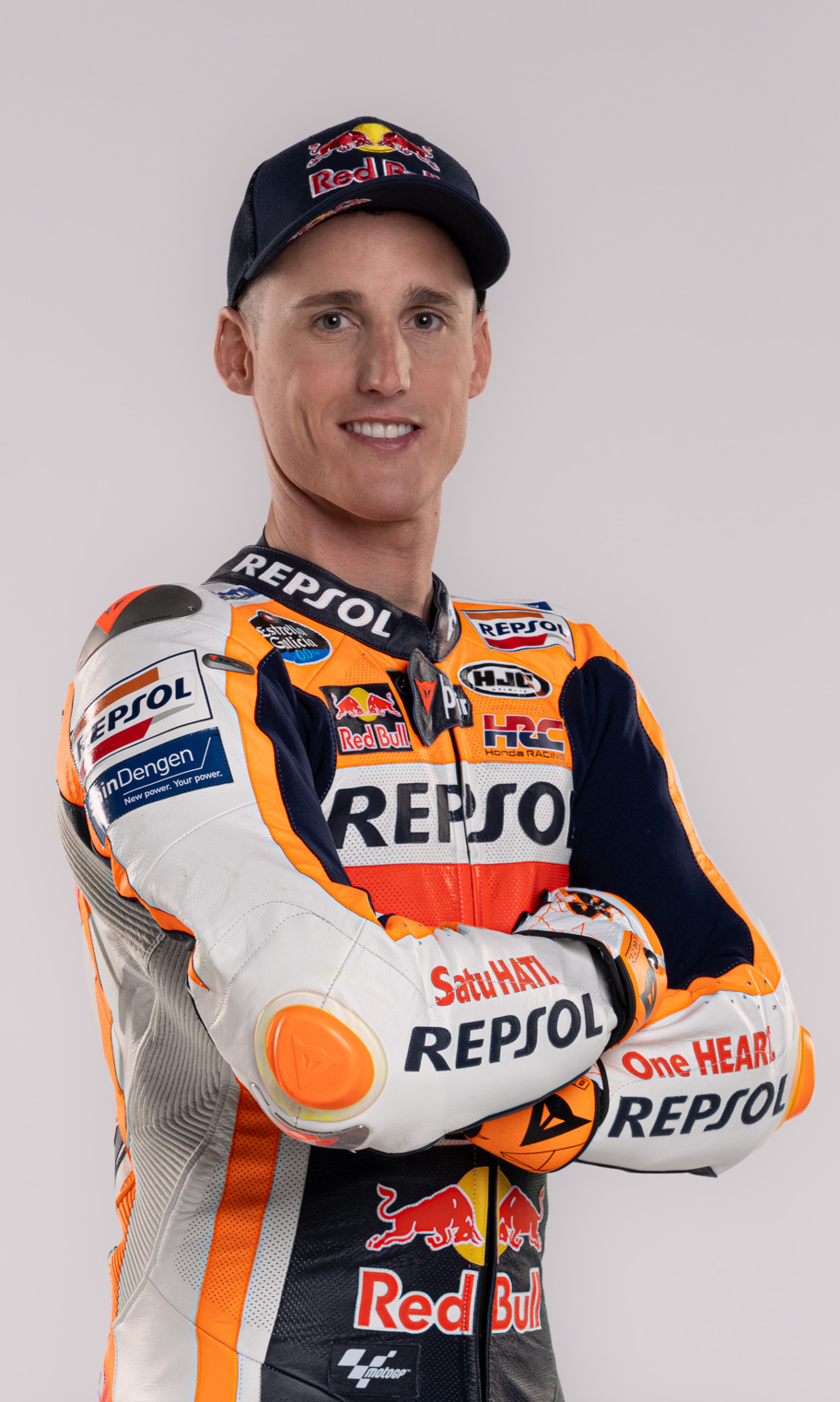
Pol Espargaró (pictured in 2022) was the 2013 Moto2 World Riders' Champion.

The 2013 FIM Moto2 World Championship was the intermediate class of the 65th Fédération Internationale de Motocyclisme (FIM) Road Racing World Championship season. Marc Márquez was the reigning champion, but did not contest in season as he joined MotoGP with Repsol Honda.

== Season summary ==
Pol Espargaró became champion in the class, after overhauling Scott Redding towards the end of the season. With six race victories, Espargaró won the championship by 40 points ahead of Redding, who won three races, with third place going to Esteve Rabat, a three-time race winner. Nicolás Terol, who finished seventh, was another three-time race winner, with other victories taken by Mika Kallio (fourth) and Jordi Torres, who was tenth in the championship. In the constructors' championship, Kalex won thirteen of the seventeen races to win the title by almost 100 points from Suter, who won the other four races.

== Calendar ==
The following Grands Prix were scheduled to take place in 2013:

The Fédération Internationale de Motocyclisme released a 18-race provisional calendar on 19 September 2012. On 23 November 2012, the calendar was updated following confirmation that the return of the Argentine Grand Prix would be postponed to 2014. The Grand Prix of the Americas held at the Circuit of the Americas in Austin, United States, replaced the Portuguese Grand Prix, which had been run at Estoril since 2000. The United States hosted two races, the other being the Indianapolis Grand Prix at the Indianapolis Motor Speedway.

Round	Date	Grand Prix	Circuit
1	7 April ‡	Commercialbank Grand Prix of Qatar	Lusail International Circuit, Lusail
2	21 April	(United States) Red Bull Grand Prix of the Americas	Circuit of the Americas, Austin
3	5 May	(Spain) Gran Premio bwin de España	Circuito de Jerez, Jerez de la Frontera
4	19 May	Monster Energy Grand Prix de France	Bugatti Circuit, Le Mans
5	2 June	(Italy) Gran Premio d'Italia TIM	Mugello Circuit, Scarperia e San Piero
6	16 June	(Catalonia) Gran Premi Aperol de Catalunya	Circuit de Barcelona-Catalunya, Montmeló
7	29 June ††	(Netherlands) Iveco TT Assen	TT Circuit Assen, Assen
8	14 July	(Germany) eni Motorrad Grand Prix Deutschland	Sachsenring, Hohenstein-Ernstthal
9	18 August	Red Bull Indianapolis Grand Prix	Indianapolis Motor Speedway, Speedway
10	25 August	(Czech Republic) bwin Grand Prix České republiky	Brno Circuit, Brno
11	1 September	(United Kingdom) Hertz British Grand Prix	Silverstone Circuit, Silverstone
12	15 September	Gran Premio Aperol di San Marino e Della Riviera di Rimini	Misano World Circuit, Misano Adriatico
13	29 September	(Aragon) Gran Premio Iveco de Aragón	MotorLand Aragón, Alcañiz
14	13 October	(Malaysia) Shell Advance Malaysian Motorcycle Grand Prix	Sepang International Circuit, Sepang
15	20 October	(Australia) Tissot Australian Grand Prix	Phillip Island Grand Prix Circuit, Phillip Island
16	27 October	AirAsia Grand Prix of Japan	Motegi Circuit, Motegi
17	10 November	(Valencian Community) Gran Premio Generali de la Comunitat Valenciana	Circuit Ricardo Tormo, Valencia

‡ = Night race
†† = Saturday race

=== Calendar changes ===
- The Grand Prix of the Americas was added to the calendar.
- The Portuguese Grand Prix was taken off the calendar. The race was scheduled on the calendar since 2000.
- The British Grand Prix was moved back, from 17 June to 1 September.
- The Japanese Grand Prix was moved back, from 14 to 27 October.

== Teams and riders ==
- A provisional entry list was released by the Fédération Internationale de Motocyclisme on 28 November 2012. An updated entry list was released on 12 February 2013. All Moto2 competitors raced with an identical CBR600RR inline-four engine developed by Honda. Teams competed with tyres supplied by Dunlop.

Team	Constructor	Motorcycle	No.	Rider	Rounds
(Switzerland) NGM Mobile Racing (Switzerland) NGM Mobile Forward Racing	Speed Up	Speed UP SF13	3	(Italy) Simone Corsi	All
(Switzerland) NGM Mobile Racing (Switzerland) NGM Mobile Forward Racing	Speed Up	Speed UP SF13	15	(San Marino) Alex de Angelis	All
(Switzerland) NGM Mobile Racing (Switzerland) NGM Mobile Forward Racing	Speed Up	Speed UP SF13	54	(Italy) Mattia Pasini	All
(Switzerland) NGM Mobile Racing (Switzerland) NGM Mobile Forward Racing	Speed Up	Speed UP SF13	88	(Spain) Ricard Cardús	All
(France) Technomag carXpert	Suter	Suter MMX2	4	(Switzerland) Randy Krummenacher	1–12, 17
(France) Technomag carXpert	Suter	Suter MMX2	21	(Malaysia) Zaqhwan Zaidi	14
(France) Technomag carXpert	Suter	Suter MMX2	70	(Switzerland) Robin Mulhauser	13
(France) Technomag carXpert	Suter	Suter MMX2	77	(Switzerland) Dominique Aegerter	All
(Italy) Came IodaRacing Project	Suter	Suter MMX2	5	(France) Johann Zarco	All
(Italy) Federal Oil Gresini Moto2 (Italy) Thai Honda PTT Gresini Moto2	Suter	Suter MMX2	7	(Indonesia) Doni Tata Pradita	1–11, 13–17
(Italy) Federal Oil Gresini Moto2 (Italy) Thai Honda PTT Gresini Moto2	Suter	Suter MMX2	10	(Thailand) Thitipong Warokorn	9–15
(Italy) Federal Oil Gresini Moto2 (Italy) Thai Honda PTT Gresini Moto2	Suter	Suter MMX2	14	(Thailand) Ratthapark Wilairot	1–8
(Italy) Federal Oil Gresini Moto2 (Italy) Thai Honda PTT Gresini Moto2	Suter	Suter MMX2	94	(Italy) Franco Morbidelli	12, 16–17
(United Kingdom) Gino Rea Race Team (United Kingdom) Gino Rea Montáže Brož Racing	FTR	FTR Moto M213	8	(United Kingdom) Gino Rea	4, 7–8, 10–13, 17
(Spain) Argiñano & Ginés Racing	Speed Up	Speed Up SF13	8	(United Kingdom) Gino Rea	14–16
(Spain) Argiñano & Ginés Racing	Speed Up	Speed Up SF13	17	(Spain) Alberto Moncayo	1–7, 9–13, 17
(Spain) Argiñano & Ginés Racing	Speed Up	Speed Up SF13	28	(Spain) Román Ramos	8
(Spain) Argiñano & Ginés Racing	Speed Up	Speed Up SF13	44	(South Africa) Steven Odendaal	All
(Spain) Blusens Avintia	Kalex	Kalex Moto2	9	(United Kingdom) Kyle Smith	1–9
(Spain) Blusens Avintia	Kalex	Kalex Moto2	24	(Spain) Toni Elías	1–11
(Spain) Blusens Avintia	Kalex	Kalex Moto2	27	(Spain) Dani Rivas	10–11
(Spain) Blusens Avintia	Kalex	Kalex Moto2	34	(Argentina) Ezequiel Iturrioz	12–17
(Spain) Blusens Avintia	Kalex	Kalex Moto2	92	(Spain) Álex Mariñelarena	12–17
(Germany) Dynavolt Intact GP	Kalex	Kalex Moto2	11	(Germany) Sandro Cortese	All
(Switzerland) Interwetten Paddock (Switzerland) Interwetten Paddock Moto2 Racing (Switzerland) Interwetten Paddock Moto2	Suter	Suter MMX2	12	(Switzerland) Thomas Lüthi	2–17
(Switzerland) Interwetten Paddock (Switzerland) Interwetten Paddock Moto2 Racing (Switzerland) Interwetten Paddock Moto2	Suter	Suter MMX2	33	(Spain) Sergio Gadea	1
(Spain) Mapfre Aspar Team Moto2 (Spain) Aspar Team Moto2	Suter	Suter MMX2	18	(Spain) Nicolás Terol	All
(Spain) Mapfre Aspar Team Moto2 (Spain) Aspar Team Moto2	Suter	Suter MMX2	81	(Spain) Jordi Torres	All
(Spain) Desguaces La Torre Maptaq (Spain) Desguaces La Torre SAG (Spain) Maptaq SAG Zelos Team	Kalex	Kalex Moto2	19	(Belgium) Xavier Siméon	All
(Spain) Desguaces La Torre Maptaq (Spain) Desguaces La Torre SAG (Spain) Maptaq SAG Zelos Team	Kalex	Kalex Moto2	23	(Germany) Marcel Schrötter	All
(Monaco) JiR Moto2	Motobi	TSR TSR6	22	(Australia) Jason O'Halloran	11–12
(Monaco) JiR Moto2	Motobi	TSR TSR6	28	(Spain) Román Ramos	13
(Monaco) JiR Moto2	Motobi	TSR TSR6	31	(Japan) Kohta Nozane	15, 17
(Monaco) JiR Moto2	Motobi	TSR TSR6	35	(Japan) Tetsuta Nagashima	16
(Monaco) JiR Moto2	Motobi	TSR TSR6	62	(Indonesia) Fadli Immammuddin	14
(Monaco) JiR Moto2	Motobi	TSR TSR6	63	(France) Mike Di Meglio	1–10
(Japan) Idemitsu Honda Team Asia	Moriwaki	Moriwaki MD600	25	(Malaysia) Azlan Shah	12–17
(Japan) Idemitsu Honda Team Asia	Moriwaki	Moriwaki MD600	72	(Japan) Yuki Takahashi	1–11
(Spain) TSR Motorsport	Kalex	Kalex Moto2	27	(Spain) Dani Rivas	3, 6
(Italy) Italtrans Racing Team	Kalex	Kalex Moto2	30	(Japan) Takaaki Nakagami	All
(Italy) Italtrans Racing Team	Kalex	Kalex Moto2	60	(Spain) Julián Simón	All
(Japan) Webike Team Norick NTS	TSR	TSR TSR6	31	(Japan) Kohta Nozane	16
(Belgium) Marc VDS Racing Team	Kalex	Kalex Moto2	36	(Finland) Mika Kallio	All
(Belgium) Marc VDS Racing Team	Kalex	Kalex Moto2	45	(United Kingdom) Scott Redding	All
(Spain) Tuenti HP 40	Kalex	Kalex Moto2	40	(Spain) Pol Espargaró	All
(Spain) Tuenti HP 40	Kalex	Kalex Moto2	49	(Spain) Axel Pons	All
(Spain) Tuenti HP 40	Kalex	Kalex Moto2	80	(Spain) Esteve Rabat	All
(United States) GP Tech	Mistral 610	Tech 3 Mistral 610	43	(United States) James Rispoli	9
(France) Singha Eneos Yamaha Tech 3	Tech 3	Tech 3 Mistral 610	46	(Thailand) Decha Kraisart	14, 16
(France) Tech 3	Tech 3	Tech 3 Mistral 610	52	(United Kingdom) Danny Kent	1–16
(France) Tech 3	Tech 3	Tech 3 Mistral 610	96	(France) Louis Rossi	All
(France) Tech 3	Tech 3	Tech 3 Mistral 610	99	(France) Lucas Mahias	17
(Spain) Petronas Raceline Malaysia	Kalex	Kalex Moto2	55	(Malaysia) Hafizh Syahrin	4, 6, 14, 17
(Spain) TargoBank Motorsport	Suter	Suter MMX2	92	(Spain) Álex Mariñelarena	3, 8
(Qatar) QMMF Racing Team (Qatar) QMMF Evalube Racing Team	Speed Up	Speed Up SF13	95	(Australia) Anthony West	All
(Qatar) QMMF Racing Team (Qatar) QMMF Evalube Racing Team	Speed Up	Speed Up SF13	97	(Indonesia) Rafid Topan Sucipto	All
(France) Promoto Sport	TransFIORmers	???	99	(France) Lucas Mahias	10

Key
Regular Rider
Wildcard Rider
Replacement Rider

=== Rider changes ===
- Sandro Cortese moved up from Moto3 to the newly established Intact GP team, on a two-year deal.
- Randy Krummenacher switched from GP Team Switzerland to Technomag-CIP within Moto2 for 2013.
- Louis Rossi and Danny Kent raced for Tech 3 Racing's Moto2 bikes in 2013, having both moved up from Moto3.

== Results and standings ==
=== Grands Prix ===
Round	Grand Prix	Pole position	Fastest lap	Winning rider	Winning team	Winning constructor	Report
1	Qatar motorcycle Grand Prix	(Spain) Pol Espargaró	(Spain) Pol Espargaró	(Spain) Pol Espargaró	(Spain) Tuenti HP 40	(Germany) Kalex	Report
2	(United States) Motorcycle Grand Prix of the Americas	(United Kingdom) Scott Redding	(Spain) Nicolás Terol	(Spain) Nicolás Terol	(Spain) Maphre Aspar Team Moto2	(Switzerland) Suter	Report
3	(Spain) Spanish motorcycle Grand Prix	(Spain) Esteve Rabat	(Spain) Esteve Rabat	(Spain) Esteve Rabat	(Spain) Tuenti HP 40	(Germany) Kalex	Report
4	(France) French motorcycle Grand Prix	(Japan) Takaaki Nakagami	(United Kingdom) Scott Redding	(United Kingdom) Scott Redding	(Belgium) Marc VDS Racing Team	(Germany) Kalex	Report
5	(Italy) Italian motorcycle Grand Prix	(United Kingdom) Scott Redding	(France) Johann Zarco	(United Kingdom) Scott Redding	(Belgium) Marc VDS Racing Team	(Germany) Kalex	Report
6	(Catalonia) Catalan motorcycle Grand Prix	(Spain) Pol Espargaró	(Switzerland) Thomas Lüthi	(Spain) Pol Espargaró	(Spain) Tuenti HP 40	(Germany) Kalex	Report
7	(Netherlands) Dutch TT	(Spain) Pol Espargaró	(Spain) Pol Espargaró	(Spain) Pol Espargaró	(Spain) Tuenti HP 40	(Germany) Kalex	Report
8	(Germany) German motorcycle Grand Prix	(Belgium) Xavier Siméon	(Spain) Julián Simón	(Spain) Jordi Torres	(Spain) Aspar Team Moto2	(Switzerland) Suter	Report
9	Indianapolis motorcycle Grand Prix	(United Kingdom) Scott Redding	(Spain) Julián Simón	(Spain) Esteve Rabat	(Spain) Tuenti HP 40	(Germany) Kalex	Report
10	Czech Republic motorcycle Grand Prix	(Japan) Takaaki Nakagami	(France) Johann Zarco	(Finland) Mika Kallio	(Belgium) Marc VDS Racing Team	(Germany) Kalex	Report
11	(United Kingdom) British motorcycle Grand Prix	(Japan) Takaaki Nakagami	(Spain) Esteve Rabat	(United Kingdom) Scott Redding	(Belgium) Marc VDS Racing Team	(Germany) Kalex	Report
12	San Marino and Rimini Riviera motorcycle Grand Prix	(Spain) Pol Espargaró	(Spain) Pol Espargaró	(Spain) Pol Espargaró	(Spain) Tuenti HP 40	(Germany) Kalex	Report
13	Aragon motorcycle Grand Prix	(Spain) Nicolás Terol	(Spain) Esteve Rabat	(Spain) Nicolás Terol	(Spain) Aspar Team Moto2	(Switzerland) Suter	Report
14	(Malaysia) Malaysian motorcycle Grand Prix	(Spain) Esteve Rabat	(Finland) Mika Kallio	(Spain) Esteve Rabat	(Spain) Tuenti HP 40	(Germany) Kalex	Report
15	(Australia) Australian motorcycle Grand Prix	(Spain) Pol Espargaró	(San Marino) Alex de Angelis	(Spain) Pol Espargaró	(Spain) Tuenti HP 40	(Germany) Kalex	Report
16	(Japan) Japanese motorcycle Grand Prix	(Finland) Mika Kallio	(Spain) Pol Espargaró	(Spain) Pol Espargaró	(Spain) Tuenti HP 40	(Germany) Kalex	Report
17	Valencian Community motorcycle Grand Prix	(Spain) Pol Espargaró	(Spain) Jordi Torres	(Spain) Nicolás Terol	(Spain) Aspar Team Moto2	(Switzerland) Suter	Report

=== Riders' standings ===
Scoring system

Points were awarded to the top fifteen finishers. A rider had to finish the race to earn points.

Position	**1st**	**2nd**	**3rd**	**4th**	**5th**	**6th**	**7th**	**8th**	**9th**	**10th**	**11th**	**12th**	**13th**	**14th**	**15th**
Points	25	20	16	13	11	10	9	8	7	6	5	4	3	2	1

Pos	Rider	Bike	QAT (Qatar)	AME (United States)	SPA (Spain)	FRA (France)	ITA (Italy)	CAT (Catalonia)	NED (Netherlands)	GER (Germany)	INP (Indianapolis)	CZE (Czech Republic)	GBR (United Kingdom)	RSM (San Marino)	ARA (Aragon)	MAL (Malaysia)	AUS (Australia)	JPN (Japan)	VAL (Valencian Community)	Pts
1	(Spain) Pol Espargaró	Kalex	**1**	Ret	3	19	4	**1**	**1**	3	4	4	8	**1**	3	2	**1**	1	**29**	265
2	(United Kingdom) Scott Redding	Kalex	2	**5**	2	1	**1**	4	2	7	**3**	8	1	6	4	7	DNS	DNS	15	225
3	(Spain) Esteve Rabat	Kalex	9	2	**1**	22	13	2	5	13	1	7	4	3	2	**1**	8	Ret	5	216
4	(Finland) Mika Kallio	Kalex	5	3	Ret	2	5	9	4	12	7	1	6	9	5	4	7	**2**	14	188
5	(Switzerland) Dominique Aegerter	Suter	4	4	8	4	10	8	3	9	5	13	5	5	13	5	6	8	10	158
6	(Switzerland) Thomas Lüthi	Suter		DNS	11	Ret	9	3	8	6	13	3	3	4	Ret	3	2	3	7	155
7	(Spain) Nicolás Terol	Suter	14	1	5	Ret	2	16	17	Ret	12	6	11	10	**1**	18	9	6	1	150
8	(Japan) Takaaki Nakagami	Kalex	3	Ret	4	**Ret**	Ret	5	DNS	10	2	**2**	**2**	2	11	8	22	9	13	149
9	(France) Johann Zarco	Suter	12	6	12	5	3	7	6	11	8	5	7	7	7	6	Ret	Ret	3	141
10	(Spain) Jordi Torres	Suter	11	13	7	Ret	6	Ret	9	1	10	10	13	15	6	9	3	Ret	2	128
11	(Italy) Simone Corsi	Speed Up	7	15	13	11	7	10	Ret	2	6	9	9	Ret	Ret	11	4	Ret	4	108
12	(Belgium) Xavier Siméon	Kalex	10	12	6	3	Ret	Ret	7	**8**	9	11	Ret	8	Ret	Ret	Ret	4	12	90
13	(Spain) Julián Simón	Kalex	6	19	16	8	17	15	10	4	11	Ret	12	12	8	10	Ret	5	11	81
14	(San Marino) Alex de Angelis	Speed Up	8	8	14	9	8	Ret	15	5	14	Ret	14	14	Ret	Ret	5	7	6	81
15	(Italy) Mattia Pasini	Speed Up	Ret	7	15	6	24	11	18	19	25	14	10	11	9	Ret	16	10	9	58
16	(Germany) Marcel Schrötter	Kalex	13	11	10	13	12	Ret	13	Ret	15	Ret	16	13	12	14	21	12	18	38
17	(Switzerland) Randy Krummenacher	Suter	19	Ret	17	10	15	6	11	17	19	16	19	16					21	22
18	(Spain) Toni Elías	Kalex	15	9	9	Ret	11	Ret	Ret	20	17	15	15							22
19	(Germany) Sandro Cortese	Kalex	17	25	18	12	14	Ret	14	14	16	Ret	20	Ret	10	Ret	11	15	16	22
20	(France) Mike Di Meglio	Motobi	16	10	19	7	18	12	Ret	24	20	Ret								19
21	(Australia) Anthony West	Speed Up	DSQ	DSQ	DSQ	DSQ	DSQ	DSQ	DSQ	DSQ	DSQ	DSQ	DSQ	DSQ	DSQ	DSQ	10	11	8	19
22	(United Kingdom) Danny Kent	Tech 3	18	17	26	15	21	13	19	Ret	22	12	18	18	15	12	13	DNS		16
23	(Spain) Ricard Cardús	Speed Up	Ret	14	20	NC	19	23	16	16	18	18	17	Ret	19	13	12	17	22	9
24	(France) Louis Rossi	Tech 3	Ret	23	24	14	25	Ret	12	21	23	19	23	19	18	16	Ret	Ret	23	6
25	(Spain) Axel Pons	Kalex	Ret	16	Ret	Ret	Ret	14	21	15	Ret	20	21	17	16	Ret	24	13	20	6
26	(United Kingdom) Gino Rea	FTR				NC			24	23		Ret	Ret	21	17				19	4
26	(United Kingdom) Gino Rea	Speed Up														17	14	14		4
27	(Spain) Álex Mariñelarena	Suter			Ret					Ret										2
27	(Spain) Álex Mariñelarena	Kalex												Ret	14	19	Ret	Ret	DNS	2
28	(Indonesia) Doni Tata Pradita	Suter	24	24	25	18	Ret	22	26	26	28	23	25		22	22	15	Ret	27	1
29	(Malaysia) Hafizh Syahrin	Kalex				21		18								15			Ret	1
	(Japan) Kohta Nozane	Motobi															17		Ret	0
	(Japan) Kohta Nozane	TSR																16		0
	(Thailand) Ratthapark Wilairot	Suter	Ret	21	Ret	Ret	16	Ret	20	22										0
	(Spain) Alberto Moncayo	Speed Up	25	Ret	23	16	22	21	23		26	Ret	Ret	Ret	21				28	0
	(Japan) Yuki Takahashi	Moriwaki	23	18	22	17	23	20	25	18	21	17	22							0
	(Italy) Franco Morbidelli	Suter												20				18	17	0
	(United Kingdom) Kyle Smith	Kalex	21	20	Ret	Ret	20	17	Ret	Ret	Ret									0
	(South Africa) Steven Odendaal	Speed Up	22	22	21	20	Ret	Ret	22	25	27	Ret	DNS	22	Ret	20	18	19	26	0
	(Malaysia) Azlan Shah	Moriwaki												23	Ret	21	19	23	25	0
	(Spain) Dani Rivas	Kalex			Ret			19				21	DNS							0
	(Japan) Tetsuta Nagashima	Motobi																20		0
	(Indonesia) Rafid Topan Sucipto	Speed Up	26	Ret	27	23	Ret	Ret	27	27	30	25	27	25	25	24	20	Ret	Ret	0
	(Spain) Román Ramos	Speed Up								Ret										0
	(Spain) Román Ramos	Motobi													20					0
	(Spain) Sergio Gadea	Suter	20																	0
	(Thailand) Decha Kraisart	Tech 3														Ret		21		0
	(Argentina) Ezequiel Iturrioz	Kalex												24	Ret	Ret	23	22	30	0
	(France) Lucas Mahias	TransFIORmers										22								0
	(France) Lucas Mahias	Tech 3																	24	0
	(Thailand) Thitipong Warokorn	Suter									29	24	26	26	24	23	DNS			0
	(Switzerland) Robin Mulhauser	Suter													23					0
	(Australia) Jason O'Halloran	Motobi											24	Ret						0
	(United States) James Rispoli	Mistral 610									24									0
	(Indonesia) Fadli Immammuddin	Motobi														Ret				0
	(Malaysia) Zaqhwan Zaidi	Suter														Ret				0
Pos	Rider	Bike	QAT (Qatar)	AME (United States)	SPA (Spain)	FRA (France)	ITA (Italy)	CAT (Catalonia)	NED (Netherlands)	GER (Germany)	INP (Indianapolis)	CZE (Czech Republic)	GBR (United Kingdom)	RSM (San Marino)	ARA (Aragon)	MAL (Malaysia)	AUS (Australia)	JPN (Japan)	VAL (Valencian Community)	Pts

Colour	Result
Gold	Winner
Silver	Second place
Bronze	Third place
Green	Points classification
Blue	Non-points classification
Blue	Non-classified finish (NC)
Purple	Retired, not classified (Ret)
Red	Did not qualify (DNQ)
Red	Did not pre-qualify (DNPQ)
Black	Disqualified (DSQ)
White	Did not start (DNS)
White	Withdrew (WD)
White	Race cancelled (C)
Blank	Did not practice (DNP)
Blank	Did not arrive (DNA)
Blank	Excluded (EX)

**Bold** – Pole
Italics – Fastest Lap
Light blue – Rookie

=== Constructors' standings ===
Each constructor received the same number of points as their best placed rider in each race.

Pos	Constructor	QAT (Qatar)	AME (United States)	SPA (Spain)	FRA (France)	ITA (Italy)	CAT (Catalonia)	NED (Netherlands)	GER (Germany)	INP (Indianapolis)	CZE (Czech Republic)	GBR (United Kingdom)	RSM (San Marino)	ARA (Aragon)	MAL (Malaysia)	AUS (Australia)	JPN (Japan)	VAL (Valencian Community)	Pts
1	(Germany) Kalex	1	2	1	1	1	1	1	3	1	1	1	1	2	1	1	1	5	392
2	(Switzerland) Suter	4	1	5	4	2	3	3	1	5	3	3	4	1	3	2	3	1	297
3	(Italy) Speed Up	7	7	13	6	7	10	15	2	6	9	9	11	9	11	4	7	4	143
4	(France) Tech 3	18	18	25	14	22	13	12	22	23	12	18	19	15	12	13	Ret	23	21
5	(Italy) Motobi	16	10	20	7	18	12	Ret	25	21	Ret	25	Ret	20	Ret	17	20	Ret	19
	(Japan) TSR																16		0
	(United Kingdom) FTR				NC			25	24		Ret	Ret	22	17				19	0
	(Japan) Moriwaki	23	19	23	18	24	20	26	19	22	18	23	24	Ret	22	19	23	25	0
	(France) Tech 3														Ret		21		0
	(France) TransFIORmers										23								0
	(France) Mistral 610									25									0
Pos	Constructor	QAT (Qatar)	AME (United States)	SPA (Spain)	FRA (France)	ITA (Italy)	CAT (Catalonia)	NED (Netherlands)	GER (Germany)	INP (Indianapolis)	CZE (Czech Republic)	GBR (United Kingdom)	RSM (San Marino)	ARA (Aragon)	MAL (Malaysia)	AUS (Australia)	JPN (Japan)	VAL (Valencian Community)	Pts
