= Lucas Mahias =

French motorcycle racer

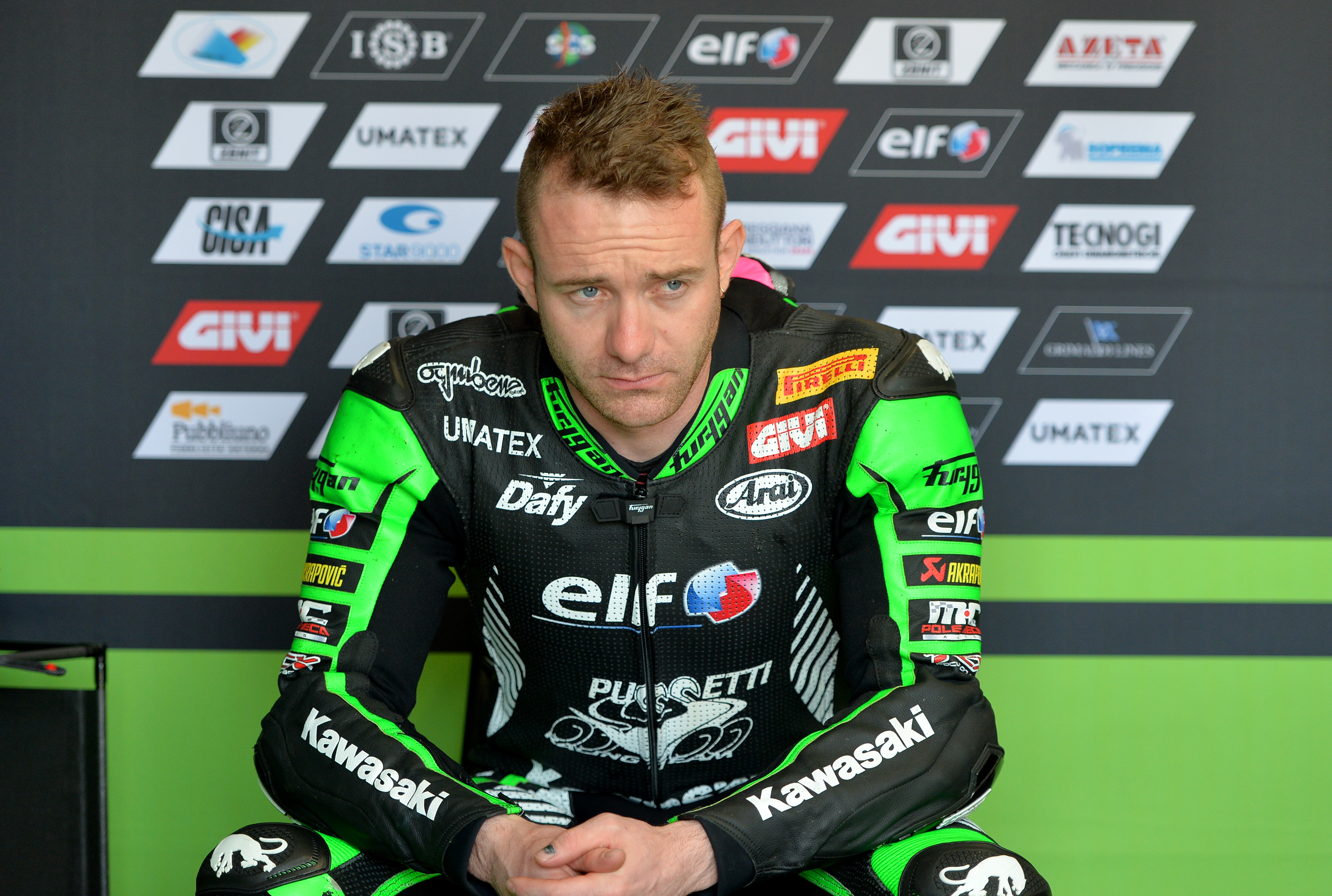
- Mahias at Phillip Island in 2020
- Nationality: French
- Born: 14 April 1989 (age 37); Mont-de-Marsan, France
- Current team: GMT94 Yamaha
- Bike number: 94
Motorcycle racing career statistics
Moto2 World Championship
| Active years | 2013–2015 |
| Manufacturers | Transfiormers, Tech 3 |
| Championships | 0 |
| 2015 championship position | NC (0 pts) |
Starts / Wins / Podiums / Poles / F. laps / Points; 6 / 0 / 0 / 0 / 0 / 0
MotoE World Championship
| Active years | 2019 |
| Manufacturers | Energica |
| Championships | 0 |
| 2019 championship position | NC (0 pts) |
Starts / Wins / Podiums / Poles / F. laps / Points; 0 / 0 / 0 / 0 / 0 / 0
Superbike World Championship
| Active years | 2016, 2021–2023 |
| Manufacturers | Kawasaki |
| Championships | 0 |
| 2023 championship position | NC (0 pts) |
Starts / Wins / Podiums / Poles / F. laps / Points; 54 / 0 / 0 / 0 / 0 / 114
Supersport World Championship
| Active years | 2014–2015, 2017–2020, 2023– |
| Manufacturers | Yamaha, Kawasaki |
| Championships | 1 (2017) |
| 2025 championship position | 7th (185 pts) |
Starts / Wins / Podiums / Poles / F. laps / Points; 121 / 9 / 33 / 9 / 9 / 1213

Lucas Alain Mahias (born 14 April 1989) is a French motorcycle racer who currently competes for GMT94 Yamaha in the Supersport World Championship. In 2017, he won the Supersport World Championship aboard a Yamaha YZF-R6, and in 2016, he won the FIM Endurance World Championship riders' title aboard a Yamaha YZF-R1. He has also won the 2014 French Supersport Championship, winning all the 12 races of the season.

== Career statistics ==
=== Career highlights ===
- 2016 - 4th, FIM Superstock 1000 Cup, Yamaha YZF-R1

=== FIM Moto2 European Championship ===
==== Races by year ====
(key) (Races in bold indicate pole position) (Races in italics indicate fastest lap)

| Year | Bike | 1 | 2 | 3 | 4 | 5 | 6 | 7 | 8 | 9 | 10 | 11 | Pos | Pts |
|---|---|---|---|---|---|---|---|---|---|---|---|---|---|---|
| 2015 | TransFIORmers | ALG1 | ALG2 | CAT | ARA1 | ARA2 | ALB | NAV1 | NAV2 | JER; Ret | VAL1; 3 | VAL2; Ret | 20th | 16 |

=== Grand Prix motorcycle racing ===
==== By season ====
| Season | Class | Motorcycle | Team | Race | Win | Podium | Pole | FLap | Pts | Plcd |
|---|---|---|---|---|---|---|---|---|---|---|
| 2013 | Moto2 | TransFIORmers | Promoto Sport | 1 | 0 | 0 | 0 | 0 | 0 | NC |
| 2013 | Moto2 | Tech 3 | Tech 3 | 1 | 0 | 0 | 0 | 0 | 0 | NC |
| 2014 | Moto2 | TransFIORmers | Promoto Sport | 3 | 0 | 0 | 0 | 0 | 0 | NC |
| 2015 | Moto2 | TransFIORmers | Promoto Sport | 1 | 0 | 0 | 0 | 0 | 0 | NC |
| 2019 | MotoE | Energica | Ajo MotoE | 0 | 0 | 0 | 0 | 0 | 0 | NC |
| Total | | | | **6** | **0** | **0** | **0** | **0** | **0** | |

==== Races by year ====
(key) (Races in bold indicate pole position; races in italics indicate fastest lap)

| Year | Class | Bike | 1 | 2 | 3 | 4 | 5 | 6 | 7 | 8 | 9 | 10 | 11 | 12 | 13 | 14 | 15 | 16 | 17 | 18 | Pos | Pts |
|---|---|---|---|---|---|---|---|---|---|---|---|---|---|---|---|---|---|---|---|---|---|---|
| 2013 | Moto2 | Transfiormers | QAT | AME | SPA | FRA | ITA | CAT | NED | GER | IND | CZE; 22 | GBR | RSM | ARA | MAL | AUS | JPN | | | NC | 0 |
| 2013 | Moto2 | Tech 3 | | | | | | | | | | | | | | | | | VAL; 24 | | NC | 0 |
| 2014 | Moto2 | Transfiormers | QAT | AME | ARG | SPA | FRA; 18 | ITA | CAT | NED | GER | IND | CZE; 31 | GBR | RSM | ARA | JPN | AUS | MAL | VAL; Ret | NC | 0 |
| 2015 | Moto2 | Transfiormers | QAT | AME | ARG | SPA | FRA | ITA | CAT | NED | GER | IND | CZE | GBR | RSM | ARA | JPN | AUS | MAL | VAL; Ret | NC | 0 |
| 2019 | MotoE | Energica | GER | AUT | RSM1 | RSM2 | VAL1; DNS | VAL2; DNS | | | | | | | | | | | | | NC | 0 |

=== Supersport World Championship ===
==== Races by year ====
(key) (Races in bold indicate pole position; races in italics indicate fastest lap)

| Year | Bike | 1 | 2 | 3 | 4 | 5 | 6 | 7 | 8 | 9 | 10 | 11 | 12 | Pos | Pts |
|---|---|---|---|---|---|---|---|---|---|---|---|---|---|---|---|
| 2014 | Yamaha | AUS | SPA | NED | ITA | GBR | MAL | ITA | POR | SPA | FRA; Ret | QAT; 4 | | 22nd | 13 |
| 2015 | Kawasaki | AUS; Ret | THA; 4 | SPA; Ret | NED; 7 | ITA; Ret | GBR; Ret | POR | ITA | MAL | | | | 12th | 51 |
| 2015 | Yamaha | | | | | | | | | | SPA; Ret | FRA; 3 | QAT; 4 | 12th | 51 |
| 2017 | Yamaha | AUS; 2 | THA; Ret | SPA; 1 | NED; 2 | ITA; 2 | GBR; 2 | ITA; Ret | GER; 3 | POR; 2 | FRA; 4 | SPA; 5 | **QAT**; 1 | 1st | 190 |
| 2018 | Yamaha | **AUS**; 1 | **THA**; 2 | SPA; 4 | NED; 4 | **ITA**; 8 | GBR; 5 | CZE; 4 | ITA; Ret | **POR**; 1 | FRA; 3 | **ARG**; 3 | **QAT**; 1 | 2nd | 185 |
| 2019 | Kawasaki | AUS; 12 | THA; 8 | SPA; 7 | NED; 5 | ITA; 8 | SPA; 6 | **ITA**; 3 | GBR; 3 | POR; 3 | FRA; 1 | ARG; 2 | QAT; 1 | 4th | 168 |

| Year | Bike | 1 | | 2 | | 3 | | 4 | | 5 | | 6 | | 7 | | 8 | | 9 | | 10 | | 11 | | 12 | | Pos | Pts |
| Year | Bike | R1 | R2 | R1 | R2 | R1 | R2 | R1 | R2 | R1 | R2 | R1 | R2 | R1 | R2 | R1 | R2 | R1 | R2 | R1 | R2 | R1 | R2 | R1 | R2 | Pos | Pts |
|---|---|---|---|---|---|---|---|---|---|---|---|---|---|---|---|---|---|---|---|---|---|---|---|---|---|---|---|
| 2020 | Kawasaki | AUS; 4 | | SPA; 4 | SPA; 3 | POR; 2 | POR; Ret | SPA; 5 | SPA; 4 | SPA; 4 | SPA; 2 | SPA; 2 | SPA; 2 | FRA; 2 | FRA; 1 | POR; Ret | POR; 1 | | | | | | | | | 2nd | 229 |
| 2023 | Kawasaki | AUS | AUS | INA | INA | NED | NED | SPA; 16 | SPA; 13 | EMI; 10 | EMI; 9 | GBR; 11 | GBR; Ret | ITA; 9 | ITA; 9 | CZE; 14 | CZE; Ret | FRA | FRA | SPA | SPA | POR | POR | SPA | SPA | 19th | 37 |
| 2024 | Yamaha | AUS; 9 | AUS; 7 | SPA; Ret | SPA; 3 | NED; 9 | NED; 24 | ITA; 15 | ITA; Ret | GBR; 10 | GBR; 10 | CZE; 6 | CZE; Ret | POR; 8 | POR; 5 | FRA; 31 | FRA; Ret | ITA; 6 | ITA; Ret | SPA; 6 | SPA; 8 | POR; 4 | POR; 4 | SPA; 5 | SPA; 7 | 9th | 155 |
| 2025 | Yamaha | AUS; 9 | AUS; 6 | POR; 4 | POR; 4 | NED; 9 | NED; Ret | ITA; 5 | ITA; 4 | **CZE**; 3 | CZE; 2 | EMI; 8 | EMI; Ret | GBR; 3 | GBR; 3 | HUN; 26 | HUN; 17 | FRA; 4 | FRA; 13 | ARA; 8 | ARA; 20 | EST; 5 | EST; Ret | SPA; Ret | SPA; DNS | 7th | 185 |
| 2026 | Yamaha | AUS; 24 | AUS; 8 | POR | POR | NED | NED | HUN | HUN | CZE | CZE | ARA | ARA | EMI | EMI | GBR | GBR | FRA | FRA | ITA | ITA | EST | EST | SPA | SPA | 13th* | 8* |

* Season still in progress.

=== Superstock 1000 Cup ===
==== Races by year ====
(key) (Races in bold indicate pole position) (Races in italics indicate fastest lap)

| Year | Bike | 1 | 2 | 3 | 4 | 5 | 6 | 7 | 8 | Pos | Pts |
|---|---|---|---|---|---|---|---|---|---|---|---|
| 2016 | Yamaha | ARA | NED | IMO | DON | MIS; 1 | LAU | **MAG**; 1 | JER; 2 | 4th | 70 |

=== Superbike World Championship ===
==== Races by year ====
(key) (Races in bold indicate pole position; races in italics indicate fastest lap)

| Year | Bike | 1 | | 2 | | 3 | | 4 | | 5 | | 6 | | 7 | | 8 | | 9 | | 10 | | 11 | | 12 | | 13 | | Pos | Pts |
| Year | Bike | R1 | R2 | R1 | R2 | R1 | R2 | R1 | R2 | R1 | R2 | R1 | R2 | R1 | R2 | R1 | R2 | R1 | R2 | R1 | R2 | R1 | R2 | R1 | R2 | R1 | R2 | Pos | Pts |
|---|---|---|---|---|---|---|---|---|---|---|---|---|---|---|---|---|---|---|---|---|---|---|---|---|---|---|---|---|---|
| 2016 | Kawasaki | AUS | AUS | THA | THA | SPA | SPA | NED; 10 | NED; 13 | ITA; DNS | ITA; DNS | MAL | MAL | GBR | GBR | ITA | ITA | USA | USA | GER | GER | FRA | FRA | SPA | SPA | QAT | QAT | 25th | 9 |

| Year | Bike | 1 | | | 2 | | | 3 | | | 4 | | | 5 | | | 6 | | | 7 | | | 8 | | | 9 | | | 10 | | | 11 | | | 12 | | | 13 | | | Pos | Pts |
| Year | Bike | R1 | SR | R2 | R1 | SR | R2 | R1 | SR | R2 | R1 | SR | R2 | R1 | SR | R2 | R1 | SR | R2 | R1 | SR | R2 | R1 | SR | R2 | R1 | SR | R2 | R1 | SR | R2 | R1 | SR | R2 | R1 | SR | R2 | R1 | SR | R2 | Pos | Pts |
|---|---|---|---|---|---|---|---|---|---|---|---|---|---|---|---|---|---|---|---|---|---|---|---|---|---|---|---|---|---|---|---|---|---|---|---|---|---|---|---|---|---|---|
| 2021 | Kawasaki | SPA; 15 | SPA; Ret | SPA; 10 | POR; 13 | POR; Ret | POR; 14 | ITA; 11 | ITA; Ret | ITA; 11 | GBR; 9 | GBR; 7 | GBR; 12 | NED; Ret | NED; DNS | NED; DNS | CZE | CZE | CZE | SPA; Ret | SPA; 15 | SPA; 14 | FRA; DNS | FRA; 14 | FRA; 13 | SPA; 13 | SPA; Ret | SPA; Ret | SPA; DNS | SPA; C | SPA; DNS | POR | POR | POR | ARG | ARG | ARG | INA | INA | INA | 18th | 44 |
| 2022 | Kawasaki | SPA; 14 | SPA; 14 | SPA; 11 | NED; 15 | NED; 13 | NED; 10 | POR; 17 | POR; Ret | POR; DNS | ITA | ITA | ITA | GBR; 12 | GBR; 14 | GBR; 14 | CZE; 12 | CZE; 12 | CZE; 9 | FRA; 10 | FRA; 14 | FRA; 12 | SPA; 14 | SPA; 11 | SPA; 12 | POR; 13 | POR; 14 | POR; Ret | ARG; 11 | ARG; 18 | ARG; 15 | INA; DNS | INA; DNS | INA; DNS | AUS; 14 | AUS; 11 | AUS; 13 | | | | 14th | 61 |
| 2023 | Kawasaki | AUS | AUS | AUS | INA | INA | INA | NED | NED | NED | SPA | SPA | SPA | ITA | ITA | ITA | GBR | GBR | GBR | IMO | IMO | IMO | CZE | CZE | CZE | FRA; 19 | FRA; 16 | FRA; DNS | SPA | SPA | SPA | POR | POR | POR | JER | JER | JER | | | | NC | 0 |

=== FIM World Endurance Championship ===
==== By team ====
| Year | Team | Bike | Rider | TC |
|---|---|---|---|---|
| 2016 | (France) GMT94 Yamaha | Yamaha YZF-R1 | (Italy) Niccolò Canepa (Spain) David Checa (France) Lucas Mahias | 2nd |
| 2016–17 | (France) GMT94 Yamaha | Yamaha YZF-R1 | (Italy) Niccolò Canepa (Spain) David Checa (France) Mike Di Meglio (France) Lucas Mahias | 1st |

=== Suzuka 8 Hours ===
| Year | Class | Team | Co-riders | Bike | Pos |
|---|---|---|---|---|---|
| 2026 | **SST** | (Japan) 3ART Best Of Bike Hamaguchi | (France) Loïc Arbel (Switzerland) Robin Mulhauser | Yamaha YZF-R1 | TBD |
