= Álex Mariñelarena =

Spanish motorcycle racer

- Nationality: Spanish
- Born: 5 October 1992 (age 34); Pamplona, Spain
Motorcycle racing career statistics
Moto2 World Championship
Active years	2012–
Manufacturers	Suter, Kalex
Championships	0
2013 championship position	27th (2 pts)
Starts / Wins / Podiums / Poles / F. laps / Points; 8 / 0 / 0 / 0 / 0 / 2

Alejandro Mariñelarena Mutiloa is a former Grand Prix motorcycle racer from Spain. He was forced to retire from racing after a serious crash on Circuit Paul Ricard.

== Career statistics ==
=== By season ===
Season	Class	Motorcycle	Team	Number	Race	Win	Podium	Pole	FLap	Pts	Plcd
2012	Moto2	Suter	Targo Bank CNS Motorsport	92	1	0	0	0	0	0	NC
2013	Moto2	Suter	TargoBank Motorsport	92	7	0	0	0	0	2	27th
2013	Moto2	Kalex	Blusens Avintia	92	7	0	0	0	0	2	27th
Total					8	0	0	0	0	2	

=== Races by year ===
(key)

Year	Class	Bike	1	2	3	4	5	6	7	8	9	10	11	12	13	14	15	16	17	Pos	Pts
2012	Moto2	Suter	QAT	SPA	POR	FRA	CAT	GBR	NED	GER	ITA	INP	CZE	RSM	ARA; 18	JPN	MAL	AUS	VAL	NC	0
2013	Moto2	Suter	QAT	AME	SPA; Ret	FRA	ITA	CAT	NED	GER; Ret	INP	CZE	GBR							27th	2
2013	Moto2	Kalex												RSM; Ret	ARA; 14	MAL; 19	AUS; Ret	JPN; Ret	VAL; DNS	27th	2
