= Ezequiel Iturrioz =

Argentine motorcycle racer

- Nationality: Argentine
- Born: 9 September 1990 (age 36); Vicuña Mackenna, Argentina
Motorcycle racing career statistics
Moto2 World Championship
Active years	2013
Manufacturers	Kalex
2013 championship position	NC (0 pts)
Starts / Wins / Podiums / Poles / F. laps / Points; 6 / 0 / 0 / 0 / 0 / 0
Supersport World Championship
Active years	2015, 2018
Manufacturers	Kawasaki
2018 championship position	NC (0 pts)
Starts / Wins / Podiums / Poles / F. laps / Points; 12 / 0 / 0 / 0 / 0 / 0

Javier Ezequiel Iturrioz (born 9 September 1990 in Vicuña Mackenna) is an Argentine motorcycle racer. He has competed in the Moto2 World Championship and the Supersport World Championship.

== Career statistics ==
=== Grand Prix motorcycle racing ===
==== By season ====
Season	Class	Motorcycle	Team	Race	Win	Podium	Pole	FLap	Pts	Plcd
2013	Moto2	Kalex	Blusens Avintia	6	0	0	0	0	0	NC
Total				6	0	0	0	0	0	

==== Races by year ====
(key)

Year	Class	Bike	1	2	3	4	5	6	7	8	9	10	11	12	13	14	15	16	17	Pos.	Pts
2013	Moto2	Kalex	QAT	AME	SPA	FRA	ITA	CAT	NED	GER	INP	CZE	GBR	RSM; 24	ARA; Ret	MAL; Ret	AUS; 23	JPN; 22	VAL; 30	NC	0

=== Supersport World Championship ===
==== Races by year ====
(key)

Year	Bike	1	2	3	4	5	6	7	8	9	10	11	12	Pos.	Pts
2015	Kawasaki	AUS	THA	SPA; 20	NED; 18	ITA; 17	GBR; Ret	POR; DNS	ITA	MAL	SPA	FRA	QAT	NC	0
2018	Kawasaki	AUS	THA	SPA	NED	ITA; Ret	GBR; 22	CZE; 23	ITA; 21	POR; 17	FRA; 20	ARG; 16	QAT; Ret	NC	0
