= Vasco van der Valk =

Dutch motorcycle racer (born 1999)

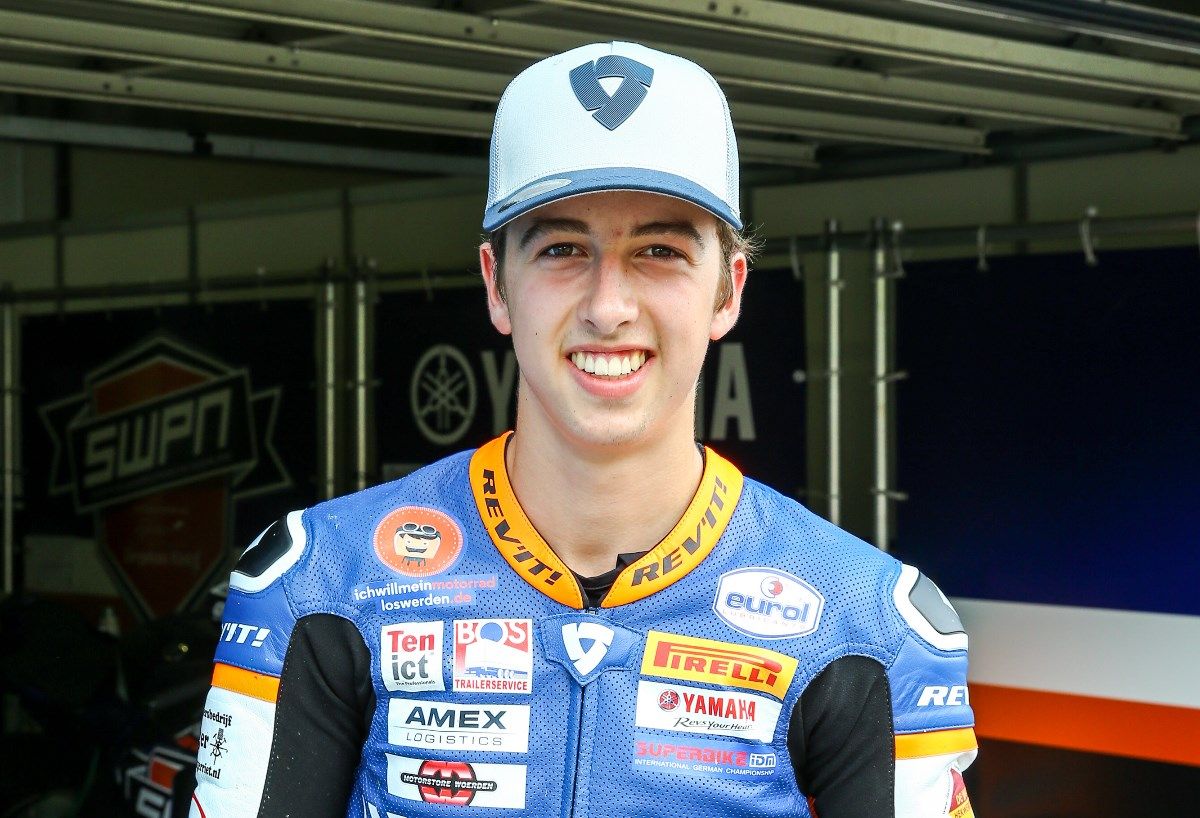
- Nationality: Dutch
- Born: 17 November 1999 (age 27); Amersfoort
- Current team: SWPN
- Bike number: 62
- Website: vascovandervalk.nl
Motorcycle racing career statistics
Supersport World Championship
Active years	2017–2018
Manufacturers	Yamaha
Championships	0
2018 championship position	NC (0 pts)
Starts / Wins / Podiums / Poles / F. laps / Points; 2 / 0 / 0 / 0 / 0 / 0

Vasco van der Valk (born 17 November 1999 in Amersfoort, the Netherlands) is a Dutch motorcycle road racer. He was second in the Dutch NSF100 Championship for Kids 2011, organised by former Grand Prix 125 rider Arie Molenaar. He then finished third in the Moriwaki 250 JuniorCup 2013 of Ten Kate Racing, after which he raced in British Motostar, support series to the British Superbike Championship, and with Supersport 600 machinery in the German IDM Championship.

== Career ==
=== Motocross (2003–2009) ===
At the age of four, Van der Valk started riding motocross bikes on a Yamaha PW50, but advanced to a KTM SX50 later. Just when he switched to a KTM 65SX at the age of eight, he was introduced to minibike racing.

=== Minibikes ===
Van der Valk first got to ride a minibike of Scott Deroue and bought a Blata two-stroke minibike of his father Bert. After a few months, he switched to a four-stroke Pasini, a brand built by Luca Pasini, father of Moto2 rider Mattia Pasini. He then started riding with a group of other kids on the same brand like Bo Bendsneyder, Livio Loi and Robert Schotman.

=== NSF100 Championship (2009–2011) ===
Despite being only nine years old, Van der Valk was selected as reserve rider for the first edition of the Dutch Honda NSF100 Championship for Kids 2011, organised by former Grand Prix 125 rider Arie Molenaar. The series was run on stock Honda NSF100 motorcycles riding karting tracks. From that series, a lot of Dutch and Belgian Grand Prix riders would emerge, like Scott Deroue, Bo Bendsneyder and Livio Loi. Van der Valk raced in this series for three years, to become runner-up behind Bendsneyder in 2011 and runner-up in the NSF100 World Race in South Africa.

=== Moriwaki 250 Junior Cup (2012–2014) ===
In 2012, a switch was made to the 'big tracks' with the Moriwaki 250 Junior Cup, run by the Ten Kate Racing team. Riders came from all over the world to ride the Moriwaki MD250H racing motorcycles, consisting of a Moriwaki chassis fitted with a Honda CRF250X motocross engine. After two years of steady improvement to a third place in the championship in 2013, the 2014 season was a bit of a disappointment because of some major crashes, the first of which happened in the pre-season on the Circuit de Barcelona-Catalunya and saw him being airlifted to hospital.

=== British Motostar (2015–2016) ===
Because of the non-existence of a Dutch Moto3 championship and the small number of riders in the German Moto3, for 2015, Van der Valk went to ride with the new Moto3-team of Isle of Man TT rider Ian Lougher in British Motostar, a support series of the British Superbike Championship. Despite being new to Moto3 and not knowing the tracks, he gradually moved forward during the season and took some impressive fourth and fifth places in the end of the season. Overall, he ended up eighth in the Moto3 Motostar championship, with him being the only rider to score points in every race. For 2016, Van der Valk switched to GA Competition so he could ride on a Geo-Honda, with Daniel Sáez as teammate, but after four races, Van der Valk split from the team, unhappy with proceedings.

=== ONK Dutch Supersport ===
Partly because of him being 1.80 m tall, Van der Valk started riding a 600 Supersport with Team Hoegee Liqui Moly Suzuki on a Suzuki GSX-R600. He competed in three nl:Open Nederlands Kampioenschap Wegrace races in which he came second twice and won one.

=== IDM ===
In 2017, Van der Valk raced for the Dutch SWPN team in the German IDM Supersport 600 Championship on a Yamaha YZF-R6. He was also granted a wildcard in the Dutch round of the Supersport World Championship on the TT Circuit Assen. For 2018, he switched to another Dutch team: Benro Racing. He did the full season in the IDM Supersport 600 Championship, and made wildcard appearances in the Supersport World Championship on the TT Circuit Assen, plus the Campionato Italiano Velocità (CIV) Supersport 600 and British Superbike Championship Supersport 600. Because of both technical issues and bad luck the results were not as solid, with only two podiums in IDM. In 2019, Van der Valk switched to the SRTD Pearle Gebben Racing Team for another year in the GermanIDM Supersport 600 Championship, with mixed results.

== End of motorsports career ==
After the 2021 season, Van der Valk decided to stop racing motorcycles and focus on his study Finance and Investments at the Erasmus University of Rotterdam.

== Career statistics ==
- 2009 – 23rd, Molenaar NSF 100 Championship for Kids
- 2010 – 6th, Molenaar NSF 100 Championship for Kids
- 2011 – 2nd, Molenaar NSF 100 Championship for Kids
- 2012 – 6th, European 250 JuniorCup by Ten Kate Racing
- 2013 – 3rd, European 250 JuniorCup by Ten Kate Racing
- 2014 – 8th, European 250 JuniorCup by Ten Kate Racing, Wildcard with Banks racing in British Motostar finishing 8th. Wildcard in Pata Honda Junior Cup finishing 5th.
- 2014 - 20th, European Junior Cup, Honda CBR500R
- 2015 – 8th, British Motostar on a Honda NSF250R by Ian Lougher Racing (ILR)
- 2016 – 4 weekends in British Motostar on a Honda NSF250R for GA Competition, 3 races in KNMV Dutch Supersport ONK (one win, 2 second places) on a Suzuki GSX-R600
- 2017 – 5th, IDM Supersport 600, 2nd Yamaha R3 Cup Race, Wildcard World Supersport
- 2018 - 8th, IDM Supersport 600, Wildcards Supersport World Championship, Campionato Italiano Velocità (CIV) and British Superbike Championship Supersport 600
- 2019 - 13th, IDM Supersport 600, Wildcards Alpe Adria Cup - Motorcycles (DNF & win), and winner of the Dutch Nations Cup (Supersport)

=== Supersport World Championship ===
==== Races by year ====
(key) (Races in bold indicate pole position, races in italics indicate fastest lap)

Year	Bike	1	2	3	4	5	6	7	8	9	10	11	12	Pos	Pts
2017	Yamaha	AUS	THA	SPA	NED; 22	ITA	GBR	ITA	GER	POR	FRA	SPA	QAT	NC	0
2018	Yamaha	AUS	THA	SPA	NED; 18	ITA	GBR	CZE	ITA	POR	FRA	ARG	QAT	NC	0

== Racing number ==
Van der Valk has been using 62 as racing number since he was five, since that was his house number and the only number he could remember at that age. Between 2009 and 2011, he had to use 26 in the Molenaar NSF 100 Championship for Kids, since he was the first reserve rider in 2009 due to his age. This automatically implied he had to use 26 after 25 regular riders.
