= 2013 Valencian Community motorcycle Grand Prix =

2013 Valencian Community Grand Prix
Race details
- Race 18 of 18 races in the 2013 Grand Prix motorcycle racing season
- Date: 10 November 2013
- Official name: Gran Premio Generali de la Comunitat Valenciana
- Location: Circuit Ricardo Tormo
- Course: Permanent racing facility; 4.005 km (2.489 mi)

MotoGP
Pole position
Rider	(Spain) Marc Márquez	Honda
Time	1:30.237	
Fastest lap
Rider	(Spain) Dani Pedrosa	Honda
Time	1:31.628 on lap 22	
Podium
First	(Spain) Jorge Lorenzo	Yamaha
Second	(Spain) Dani Pedrosa	Honda
Third	(Spain) Marc Márquez	Honda

Moto2
Pole position
Rider	(Spain) Pol Espargaró	Kalex
Time	1:34.957	
Fastest lap
Rider	(Spain) Jordi Torres	Suter
Time	1:35.694 on lap 12	
Podium
First	(Spain) Nicolás Terol	Suter
Second	(Spain) Jordi Torres	Suter
Third	(France) Johann Zarco	Suter

Moto3
Pole position
Rider	(Spain) Álex Rins	KTM
Time	1:39.459	
Fastest lap
Rider	(Spain) Luis Salom	KTM
Time	1:39.744 on lap 4	
Podium
First	(Spain) Maverick Viñales	KTM
Second	(Germany) Jonas Folger	Kalex KTM
Third	(Spain) Álex Rins	KTM

The 2013 Valencian Community motorcycle Grand Prix was the eighteenth and final round of the 2013 MotoGP season. It was held at the Circuit Ricardo Tormo in Valencia on 10 November 2013.

Marc Márquez became MotoGP world champion in his rookie season, becoming the first rider to do so since Kenny Roberts in 1978.

Maverick Viñales became Moto3 world champion in the last corner of the season, after a battle with Moto3 runner-up Álex Rins.

== Classification ==
=== MotoGP ===
Pos.	No.	Rider	Team	Manufacturer	Laps	Time/Retired	Grid	Points
1	99	(Spain) Jorge Lorenzo	Yamaha Factory Racing	Yamaha	30	46:10.302	2	25
2	26	(Spain) Dani Pedrosa	Repsol Honda Team	Honda	30	+3.934	3	20
3	93	(Spain) Marc Márquez	Repsol Honda Team	Honda	30	+7.357	1	16
4	46	(Italy) Valentino Rossi	Yamaha Factory Racing	Yamaha	30	+10.579	4	13
5	19	(Spain) Álvaro Bautista	Go&Fun Honda Gresini	Honda	30	+14.965	7	11
6	6	(Germany) Stefan Bradl	LCR Honda MotoGP	Honda	30	+24.399	8	10
7	38	(United Kingdom) Bradley Smith	Monster Yamaha Tech 3	Yamaha	30	+29.043	6	9
8	69	(United States) Nicky Hayden	Ducati Team	Ducati	30	+39.893	8	8
9	4	(Italy) Andrea Dovizioso	Ducati Team	Ducati	30	+53.196	9	7
10	51	(Italy) Michele Pirro	Ducati Test Team	Ducati	30	+1:02.983	17	6
11	41	(Spain) Aleix Espargaró	Power Electronics Aspar	ART	30	+1:04.197	14	5
12	8	(Spain) Héctor Barberá	Avintia Blusens	FTR	30	+1:06.826	13	4
13	71	(Italy) Claudio Corti	NGM Mobile Forward Racing	FTR Kawasaki	30	+1:11.481	15	3
14	9	(Italy) Danilo Petrucci	Came IodaRacing Project	Ioda-Suter	30	+1:13.643	12	2
15	5	(United States) Colin Edwards	NGM Mobile Forward Racing	FTR Kawasaki	30	+1:24.249	18	1
16	7	(Japan) Hiroshi Aoyama	Avintia Blusens	FTR	30	+1:33.010	19	
17	70	(United Kingdom) Michael Laverty	Paul Bird Motorsport	ART	29	+1 lap	21	
18	23	(Italy) Luca Scassa	Cardion AB Motoracing	ART	29	+1 lap	22	
19	67	(Australia) Bryan Staring	Go&Fun Honda Gresini	FTR Honda	29	+1 lap	23	
20	45	(Austria) Martin Bauer	Remus Racing Team	S&B Suter	29	+1 lap	26	
Ret	29	(Italy) Andrea Iannone	Energy T.I. Pramac Racing	Ducati	26	Accident	11	
Ret	14	(France) Randy de Puniet	Power Electronics Aspar	ART	23	Retirement	20	
Ret	35	(United Kingdom) Cal Crutchlow	Monster Yamaha Tech 3	Yamaha	9	Accident	5	
Ret	68	(Colombia) Yonny Hernández	Ignite Pramac Racing	Ducati	8	Retirement	16	
Ret	52	(Czech Republic) Lukáš Pešek	Came IodaRacing Project	Ioda-Suter	3	Accident	25	
Ret	50	(Australia) Damian Cudlin	Paul Bird Motorsport	PBM	3	Accident	24	

=== Moto2 ===
Pos	No	Rider	Manufacturer	Laps	Time/Retired	Grid	Points
1	18	(Spain) Nicolás Terol	Suter	27	43:24.972	6	25
2	81	(Spain) Jordi Torres	Suter	27	+4.047	3	20
3	5	(France) Johann Zarco	Suter	27	+5.993	8	16
4	3	(Italy) Simone Corsi	Speed Up	27	+5.994	2	13
5	80	(Spain) Esteve Rabat	Kalex	27	+8.316	4	11
6	15	(San Marino) Alex de Angelis	Speed Up	27	+10.596	7	10
7	12	(Switzerland) Thomas Lüthi	Suter	27	+11.219	5	9
8	95	(Australia) Anthony West	Speed Up	27	+12.334	21	8
9	54	(Italy) Mattia Pasini	Speed Up	27	+13.383	16	7
10	77	(Switzerland) Dominique Aegerter	Suter	27	+14.609	11	6
11	60	(Spain) Julián Simón	Kalex	27	+14.805	15	5
12	19	(Belgium) Xavier Siméon	Kalex	27	+18.168	9	4
13	30	(Japan) Takaaki Nakagami	Kalex	27	+18.792	10	3
14	36	(Finland) Mika Kallio	Kalex	27	+23.555	12	2
15	45	(United Kingdom) Scott Redding	Kalex	27	+27.479	17	1
16	11	(Germany) Sandro Cortese	Kalex	27	+35.021	14	
17	94	(Italy) Franco Morbidelli	Suter	27	+35.314	23	
18	23	(Germany) Marcel Schrötter	Kalex	27	+35.323	19	
19	8	(United Kingdom) Gino Rea	FTR	27	+35.405	13	
20	49	(Spain) Axel Pons	Kalex	27	+35.420	25	
21	4	(Switzerland) Randy Krummenacher	Suter	27	+36.372	20	
22	88	(Spain) Ricard Cardús	Speed Up	27	+41.540	18	
23	96	(France) Louis Rossi	Tech 3	27	+43.455	22	
24	99	(France) Lucas Mahias	Tech 3	27	+50.510	26	
25	25	(Malaysia) Azlan Shah	Moriwaki	27	+1:04.591	28	
26	44	(South Africa) Steven Odendaal	Speed Up	27	+1:04.667	30	
27	7	(Indonesia) Doni Tata Pradita	Suter	27	+1:05.070	32	
28	17	(Spain) Alberto Moncayo	Speed Up	27	+1:24.368	31	
29	40	(Spain) Pol Espargaró	Kalex	27	+1:33.265	1	
30	34	(Argentina) Ezequiel Iturrioz	Kalex	26	+1 lap	33	
Ret	31	(Japan) Kohta Nozane	Motobi	14	Accident	27	
Ret	97	(Indonesia) Rafid Topan Sucipto	Speed Up	6	Accident	29	
Ret	55	(Malaysia) Hafizh Syahrin	Kalex	5	Retirement	24	
DNS	92	(Spain) Álex Mariñelarena	Kalex		Did not start		
OFFICIAL MOTO2 REPORT

=== Moto3 ===
Pos	No	Rider	Manufacturer	Laps	Time/Retired	Grid	Points
1	25	(Spain) Maverick Viñales	KTM	24	40:12.463	3	25
2	94	(Germany) Jonas Folger	Kalex KTM	24	+0.186	4	20
3	42	(Spain) Álex Rins	KTM	24	+0.187	1	16
4	12	(Spain) Álex Márquez	KTM	24	+13.666	7	13
5	7	(Spain) Efrén Vázquez	Mahindra	24	+13.708	10	11
6	10	(France) Alexis Masbou	FTR Honda	24	+28.587	8	10
7	32	(Spain) Isaac Viñales	FTR Honda	24	+28.776	19	9
8	22	(Spain) Ana Carrasco	KTM	24	+28.794	13	8
9	65	(Germany) Philipp Öttl	Kalex KTM	24	+28.953	14	7
10	44	(Portugal) Miguel Oliveira	Mahindra	24	+29.185	17	6
11	5	(Italy) Romano Fenati	FTR Honda	24	+29.347	11	5
12	41	(South Africa) Brad Binder	Mahindra	24	+29.507	12	4
13	63	(Malaysia) Zulfahmi Khairuddin	KTM	24	+30.666	9	3
14	39	(Spain) Luis Salom	KTM	24	+34.153	2	2
15	3	(Italy) Matteo Ferrari	FTR Honda	24	+37.518	22	1
16	84	(Czech Republic) Jakub Kornfeil	Kalex KTM	24	+38.056	20	
17	57	(Brazil) Eric Granado	Kalex KTM	24	+38.487	24	
18	61	(Australia) Arthur Sissis	KTM	24	+42.363	23	
19	29	(Japan) Hyuga Watanabe	FTR Honda	24	+42.619	28	
20	77	(Italy) Lorenzo Baldassarri	FTR Honda	24	+43.890	21	
21	53	(Netherlands) Jasper Iwema	Kalex KTM	24	+44.620	18	
22	49	(Spain) Jorge Navarro	MIR Honda	24	+58.149	30	
23	58	(Spain) Juan Francisco Guevara	TSR Honda	24	+1:12.585	26	
24	9	(Germany) Toni Finsterbusch	Kalex KTM	24	+1:13.367	31	
25	80	(Malaysia) Hafiq Azmi	FTR Honda	24	+1:13.461	32	
26	66	(Germany) Florian Alt	Kalex KTM	24	+1:15.260	33	
27	23	(Italy) Niccolò Antonelli	FTR Honda	23	+1 lap	6	
Ret	8	(Australia) Jack Miller	FTR Honda	18	Accident	5	
Ret	4	(Italy) Francesco Bagnaia	FTR Honda	13	Retirement	27	
Ret	11	(Belgium) Livio Loi	Kalex KTM	12	Accident	25	
Ret	31	(Finland) Niklas Ajo	KTM	11	Accident	15	
Ret	21	(Germany) Luca Amato	Mahindra	11	Accident	29	
Ret	17	(United Kingdom) John McPhee	FTR Honda	8	Accident	16	
DNS	89	(France) Alan Techer	TSR Honda		Did not start		
OFFICIAL MOTO3 REPORT

== Championship standings after the race (MotoGP) ==
Below are the standings for the top five riders and constructors after round eighteen has concluded.

Riders' Championship standings

Pos.	Rider	Points
1	(Spain) Marc Márquez	334
2	(Spain) Jorge Lorenzo	330
3	(Spain) Dani Pedrosa	300
4	(Italy) Valentino Rossi	237
5	(United Kingdom) Cal Crutchlow	188

Constructors' Championship standings

Pos.	Constructor	Points
1	(Japan) Honda	389
2	(Japan) Yamaha	381
3	(Italy) Ducati	155
4	(Italy) ART	99
5	(United Kingdom) FTR Kawasaki	46

Notes:

- Only the top five positions are included for both sets of standings.
- ^{1} All points from the race victory for Marc Márquez were deducted as a result of a decision from Race Direction, after Márquez collided with teammate Dani Pedrosa during the race. Honda's next-best finisher was Álvaro Bautista, who scored a fourth-place finish.

Previous race: 2013 Japanese Grand Prix	FIM Grand Prix World Championship; 2013 season	Next race: 2014 Qatar Grand Prix
Previous race: 2012 Valencian Grand Prix	Valencian Community motorcycle Grand Prix	Next race: 2014 Valencian Grand Prix
