= 2018 Supersport World Championship =

2018 Supersport World Championship
Previous:	2017	Next:	2019
Support series: Superbike World Championship; Supersport 300 World Championship; European Superstock 1000 Championship

The 2018 Supersport World Championship season was the twenty-second season of the Supersport World Championship, the twentieth held under this name.

== Race calendar and results ==
2018 calendar
Round	Country	Circuit	Date	Superpole	Fastest lap	Winning rider	Winning team
1	Australia	Phillip Island Grand Prix Circuit	25 February	(France) Lucas Mahias	(Germany) Sandro Cortese	(France) Lucas Mahias	GRT Yamaha Official WorldSSP Team
2	Thailand	Chang International Circuit	25 March	(France) Lucas Mahias	(Switzerland) Randy Krummenacher	(Switzerland) Randy Krummenacher	Bardahl Evan Bros. WorldSSP Team
3	Spain	MotorLand Aragón	15 April	(Germany) Sandro Cortese	(Germany) Sandro Cortese	(Germany) Sandro Cortese	Kallio Racing
4	Netherlands	TT Circuit Assen	22 April	(Germany) Sandro Cortese	(Switzerland) Randy Krummenacher	(France) Jules Cluzel	NRT
5	Italy	Autodromo Enzo e Dino Ferrari	13 May	(France) Lucas Mahias	(France) Lucas Mahias	(France) Jules Cluzel	NRT
6	United Kingdom	Donington Park	27 May	(France) Jules Cluzel	(Germany) Sandro Cortese	(Germany) Sandro Cortese	Kallio Racing
7	Czech Republic	Brno Circuit	10 June	(Germany) Sandro Cortese	(France) Lucas Mahias	(France) Jules Cluzel	NRT
8	Italy	Misano World Circuit Marco Simoncelli	8 July	(Italy) Federico Caricasulo	(Germany) Sandro Cortese	(Italy) Federico Caricasulo	GRT Yamaha Official WorldSSP Team
9	Portugal	Autódromo Internacional do Algarve	16 September	(France) Lucas Mahias	(France) Lucas Mahias	(France) Lucas Mahias	GRT Yamaha Official WorldSSP Team
10	France	Circuit de Nevers Magny-Cours	30 September	(Italy) Federico Caricasulo	(Germany) Sandro Cortese	(France) Jules Cluzel	NRT
11	Argentina	Circuito San Juan Villicum	14 October	(France) Lucas Mahias	(Germany) Sandro Cortese	(France) Jules Cluzel	NRT
12	Qatar	Losail International Circuit	27 October	(France) Lucas Mahias	(Germany) Sandro Cortese	(France) Lucas Mahias	GRT Yamaha Official WorldSSP Team

== Entry list ==
2018 entry list
Team	Constructor	Motorcycle	No.	Rider	Rounds
MV Agusta Reparto Corse by Vamag	MV Agusta	MV Agusta F3 675	3	(Italy) Raffaele De Rosa	All
MV Agusta Reparto Corse by Vamag	MV Agusta	MV Agusta F3 675	86	(Italy) Ayrton Badovini	All
Profile Racing	Triumph	Triumph Daytona 675	4	(Republic of Ireland) Jack Kennedy	2
Profile Racing	Triumph	Triumph Daytona 675	35	(United Kingdom) Stefan Hill	1, 3–8
Profile Racing	Triumph	Triumph Daytona 675	49	(United Kingdom) Samuel Hornsey	9–12
Profile Racing	Triumph	Triumph Daytona 675	81	(United Kingdom) Luke Stapleford	1–5
Profile Racing	Yamaha	Yamaha YZF-R6	81	(United Kingdom) Luke Stapleford	6–12
Yamaha Thailand Racing Team	Yamaha	Yamaha YZF-R6	5	(Thailand) Ratthapong Wilairot	2
Yamaha Thailand Racing Team	Yamaha	Yamaha YZF-R6	24	(Thailand) Decha Kraisart	2
GMT94 Yamaha	Yamaha	Yamaha YZF-R6	6	(France) Corentin Perolari	3, 6, 8–12
GMT94 Yamaha	Yamaha	Yamaha YZF-R6	94	(France) Mike Di Meglio	1–2
Cube Racing	Kawasaki	Kawasaki ZX-6R	7	(Australia) Tom Toparis	1
Orelac Racing VerdNatura	Kawasaki	Kawasaki ZX-6R	10	(Spain) Nacho Calero	All
Kallio Racing	Yamaha	Yamaha YZF-R6	11	(Germany) Sandro Cortese	All
Kallio Racing	Yamaha	Yamaha YZF-R6	84	(Belgium) Loris Cresson	All
Gemar Team Lorini	Honda	Honda CBR600RR	12	(United Kingdom) Alex Murley	9–12
Gemar Team Lorini	Honda	Honda CBR600RR	19	(Italy) Alex Baldolini	7–8
Gemar Team Lorini	Honda	Honda CBR600RR	74	(Netherlands) Jaimie van Sikkelerus	All
Gemar Team Lorini	Honda	Honda CBR600RR	111	(United Kingdom) Kyle Smith	1–6
EAB antwest Racing	Kawasaki	Kawasaki ZX-6R	13	(Australia) Anthony West	1–8
EAB antwest Racing	Kawasaki	Kawasaki ZX-6R	33	(Netherlands) Kevin van Leuven	10
EAB antwest Racing	Kawasaki	Kawasaki ZX-6R	51	(Netherlands) Glenn van Straalen	11–12
Czech Road Racing Team Chalupari	Yamaha	Yamaha YZF-R6	14	(Czech Republic) Michal Chalupa	7
NRT	Yamaha	Yamaha YZF-R6	16	(France) Jules Cluzel	All
NRT	Yamaha	Yamaha YZF-R6	36	(Austria) Thomas Gradinger	All
Bardahl Evan Bros. WorldSSP Team	Yamaha	Yamaha YZF-R6	21	(Switzerland) Randy Krummenacher	All
Freudenberg World SSP Team	Yamaha	Yamaha YZF-R6	23	(Germany) Max Enderlein	7
Kawasaki Puccetti Racing	Kawasaki	Kawasaki ZX-6R	25	(Malaysia) Azlan Shah Kamaruzaman	2
Kawasaki Puccetti Racing	Kawasaki	Kawasaki ZX-6R	32	(Portugal) Sheridan Morais	3–4, 6–8
Kawasaki Puccetti Racing	Kawasaki	Kawasaki ZX-6R	50	(Japan) Kengo Nagao	9
Kawasaki Puccetti Racing	Kawasaki	Kawasaki ZX-6R	54	(Turkey) Kenan Sofuoğlu	1, 5
Kawasaki Puccetti Racing	Kawasaki	Kawasaki ZX-6R	78	(Japan) Hikari Okubo	All
Kawasaki Puccetti Racing	Kawasaki	Kawasaki ZX-6R	98	(Spain) Héctor Barberá	9–12
Team GoEleven Kawasaki	Kawasaki	Kawasaki ZX-6R	29	(Australia) Ted Collins	2
Team GoEleven Kawasaki	Kawasaki	Kawasaki ZX-6R	34	(Argentina) Ezequiel Iturrioz	5–12
Team GoEleven Kawasaki	Kawasaki	Kawasaki ZX-6R	44	(Italy) Luigi Morciano	7
Team GoEleven Kawasaki	Kawasaki	Kawasaki ZX-6R	65	(Italy) Michael Canducci	1, 3–6
Team GoEleven Kawasaki	Kawasaki	Kawasaki ZX-6R	83	(Australia) Lachlan Epis	1–4
Team GoEleven Kawasaki	Kawasaki	Kawasaki ZX-6R	88	(Germany) Christian Stange	8–12
Racedays	Honda	Honda CBR600RR	38	(Estonia) Hannes Soomer	All
Emperador Racing Team	Yamaha	Yamaha YZF-R6	39	(Spain) Borja Quero	9
Team Rosso Corsa	Yamaha	Yamaha YZF-R6	42	(Italy) Marco Bussolotti	8
Pleo Racing Team	Kawasaki	Kawasaki ZX-6R	43	(Italy) Stefano Valtulini	8
VEPP Racing	Honda	Honda CBR600RR	48	(Hungary) Gergő Molnár	7
Team Greenspeed	Kawasaki	Kawasaki ZX-6R	52	(Italy) Marco Malone	5
Renzi Corse	Kawasaki	Kawasaki ZX-6R	53	(Italy) Nicola Jr. Morrentino	5
G.A.S. Racing Team	Yamaha	Yamaha YZF-R6	55	(Italy) Massimo Roccoli	5
G.A.S. Racing Team	Yamaha	Yamaha YZF-R6	60	(Italy) Lorenzo Gabellini	5, 8
CIA Landlord Insurance Honda	Honda	Honda CBR600RR	56	(Hungary) Péter Sebestyén	8–12
CIA Landlord Insurance Honda	Honda	Honda CBR600RR	61	(United Kingdom) Ryan Vickers	6
CIA Landlord Insurance Honda	Honda	Honda CBR600RR	66	(Finland) Niki Tuuli	1–5
CIA Landlord Insurance Honda	Honda	Honda CBR600RR	96	(United Kingdom) Andrew Irwin	2–7
CIA Landlord Insurance Honda	Honda	Honda CBR600RR	111	(United Kingdom) Kyle Smith	7–12
Benro Racing	Yamaha	Yamaha YZF-R6	62	(Netherlands) Vasco van der Valk	4
Extreme Racing Bardahl	MV Agusta	MV Agusta F3 675	63	(Italy) Davide Stirpe	5, 8
GRT Yamaha Official WorldSSP Team	Yamaha	Yamaha YZF-R6	64	(Italy) Federico Caricasulo	All
GRT Yamaha Official WorldSSP Team	Yamaha	Yamaha YZF-R6	144	(France) Lucas Mahias	All
Floramo Monaco Racing Team	Honda	Honda CBR600RR	65	(Italy) Michael Canducci	7
Team Rosso e Nero	Yamaha	Yamaha YZF-R6	65	(Italy) Michael Canducci	8
Flembbo Leader Team	Kawasaki	Kawasaki ZX-6R	67	(France) Gaëtan Matern	10
Motor Village 69 Racing	Honda	Honda CBR600RR	69	(Czech Republic) Pierre Coppa	7
H43 Team Nobby Denson	Kawasaki	Kawasaki ZX-6R	70	(Spain) Miquel Pons	9
The BlackSheep Team	Yamaha	Yamaha YZF-R6	71	(Italy) Marco Muzio	10
ENI_Motor7_Pequeno Motos	Yamaha	Yamaha YZF-R6	75	(Portugal) Ivo Lopes	9
MAXIGP108	Yamaha	Yamaha YZF-R6	80	(France) Maximilien Bau	10
Paukku Racing	Triumph	Triumph Daytona 675	82	(Finland) Pauli Pekkanen	10
Scuderia Improve – Firenze Motor	Honda	Honda CBR600RR	93	(Italy) Roberto Mercandelli	8
Core Kawasaki Thailand Racing Team	Kawasaki	Kawasaki ZX-6R	99	(Thailand) Thitipong Warokorn	2
FIM Europe Supersport Cup entries
GRT Yamaha Official WorldSSP Junior Team	Yamaha	Yamaha YZF-R6	15	(Italy) Alfonso Coppola	3–10
Sterkman Motorsport by HRP	Suzuki	Suzuki GSX-R600	22	(Finland) Eemeli Lahti	3–8
Team Hartog – Against Cancer	Kawasaki	Kawasaki ZX-6R	47	(Netherlands) Rob Hartog	3–10
SSP Hungary Racing; Nordfilm Packaging SSP Hungary Racing	Kawasaki	Kawasaki ZX-6R	56	(Hungary) Péter Sebestyén	3–5
SSP Hungary Racing; Nordfilm Packaging SSP Hungary Racing	Kawasaki	Kawasaki ZX-6R	97	(Hungary) Richárd Bódis	8
Chromeburner Wayne's Racingteam MtM	Kawasaki	Kawasaki ZX-6R	77	(Netherlands) Wayne Tessels	3–10

Key
Regular rider
Wildcard rider
Replacement rider

- All entries used Pirelli tyres.

== Championship standings ==
=== Riders' championship ===
Pos.	Rider	Bike	PHI (Australia)	CHA (Thailand)	ARA (Spain)	ASS (Netherlands)	IMO (Italy)	DON (United Kingdom)	BRN (Czech Republic)	MIS (Italy)	POR (Portugal)	MAG (France)	VIL (Argentina)	LOS (Qatar)	Pts
1	(Germany) Sandro Cortese	Yamaha	3	4	**1**	**6**	4	1	**2**	3	6	2	2	2	208
2	(France) Lucas Mahias	Yamaha	**1**	**2**	4	4	**8**	5	4	Ret	**1**	3	**3**	**1**	185
3	(France) Jules Cluzel	Yamaha	7	Ret	3	1	1	**2**	1	4	Ret	1	1	Ret	183
4	(Switzerland) Randy Krummenacher	Yamaha	2	1	11	2	5	4	5	5	5	5	6	5	159
5	(Italy) Federico Caricasulo	Yamaha	4	3	2	Ret	2	6	Ret	**1**	2	**13**	Ret	3	143
6	(Italy) Raffaele De Rosa	MV Agusta	6	7	Ret	3	3	3	3	2	4	7	Ret	8	133
7	(Austria) Thomas Gradinger	Yamaha	10	11	23	9	12	8	6	Ret	9	4	4	4	86
8	(United Kingdom) Kyle Smith	Honda	8	Ret	5	Ret	24	13	8	7	3	8	7	Ret	72
9	(United Kingdom) Luke Stapleford	Triumph	5	10	6	5	9								56
9	(United Kingdom) Luke Stapleford	Yamaha						16	18	14	12	15	12	Ret	56
10	(Australia) Anthony West	Kawasaki	Ret	6	9	DNS	6	11	7	6					51
11	(Italy) Ayrton Badovini	MV Agusta	9	15	Ret	12	Ret	7	Ret	10	8	12	11	11	49
12	(Belgium) Loris Cresson	Yamaha	12	13	12	10	13	12	10	Ret	DNS	18	10	12	40
13	(Japan) Hikari Okubo	Kawasaki	14	19	Ret	Ret	10	Ret	13	9	10	9	8	Ret	39
14	(Finland) Niki Tuuli	Honda	11	9	8	7	7								38
15	(France) Corentin Perolari	Yamaha			16			15		12	Ret	6	5	6	36
16	(Estonia) Hannes Soomer	Honda	Ret	17	18	11	16	14	12	15	7	11	13	9	36
17	(Spain) Héctor Barberá	Kawasaki									11	10	9	7	27
18	(Netherlands) Rob Hartog	Kawasaki			10	8	11	Ret	11	13	DSQ	17			27
19	(Portugal) Sheridan Morais	Kawasaki			7	Ret		9	Ret	Ret					16
20	(Thailand) Thitipong Warokorn	Kawasaki		5											11
21	(Finland) Eemeli Lahti	Suzuki			13	15	Ret	18	9	Ret					11
22	(United Kingdom) Andrew Irwin	Honda		20	20	13	14	10	17						11
23	(Hungary) Péter Sebestyén	Kawasaki			21	19	17								9
23	(Hungary) Péter Sebestyén	Honda								17	Ret	14	15	10	9
24	(Italy) Lorenzo Gabellini	Yamaha					20			8					8
25	(Thailand) Ratthapong Wilairot	Yamaha		8											8
26	(Italy) Marco Bussolotti	Yamaha								11					5
27	(Netherlands) Jaimie van Sikkelerus	Honda	16	21	19	Ret	Ret	Ret	DNS	22	14	Ret	18	13	5
28	(Germany) Christian Stange	Kawasaki								Ret	15	16	14	14	5
29	(Republic of Ireland) Jack Kennedy	Triumph		12											4
30	(Spain) Miquel Pons	Kawasaki									13				3
31	(Turkey) Kenan Sofuoğlu	Kawasaki	13				Ret								3
32	(Italy) Alfonso Coppola	Yamaha			Ret	20	19	19	14	23	19	25			2
33	(Netherlands) Wayne Tessels	Kawasaki			22	14	21	20	20	20	Ret	19			2
34	(Italy) Michael Canducci	Kawasaki	Ret		14	Ret	18	21							2
34	(Italy) Michael Canducci	Honda							16						2
34	(Italy) Michael Canducci	Yamaha								19					2
35	(Thailand) Decha Kraisart	Yamaha		14											2
36	(Spain) Nacho Calero	Kawasaki	18	Ret	17	17	22	Ret	21	Ret	Ret	24	20	15	1
37	(Italy) Alex Baldolini	Honda							15	Ret					1
38	(Italy) Nicola Jr. Morrentino	Kawasaki					15								1
39	(United Kingdom) Stefan Hill	Triumph	DNS		15	16	23	17	Ret	Ret					1
40	(Australia) Tom Toparis	Kawasaki	15												1
	(United Kingdom) Alex Murley	Honda									Ret	26	19	16	0
	(Argentina) Ezequiel Iturrioz	Kawasaki					Ret	22	23	21	17	20	16	Ret	0
	(United Kingdom) Samuel Hornsey	Triumph									16	21	17	Ret	0
	(Italy) Davide Stirpe	MV Agusta					DNS			16					0
	(Malaysia) Azlan Shah Kamaruzaman	Kawasaki		16											0
	(France) Mike Di Meglio	Yamaha	17	18											0
	(Japan) Kengo Nagao	Kawasaki									18				0
	(Italy) Roberto Mercandelli	Honda								18					0
	(Netherlands) Vasco van der Valk	Yamaha				18									0
	(Germany) Max Enderlein	Yamaha							19						0
	(Netherlands) Kevin van Leuven	Kawasaki										22			0
	(Italy) Luigi Morciano	Kawasaki							22						0
	(Australia) Ted Collins	Kawasaki		22											0
	(Finland) Pauli Pekkanen	Triumph										23			0
	(Czech Republic) Michal Chalupa	Yamaha							24						0
	(Australia) Lachlan Epis	Kawasaki	Ret	Ret	24	Ret									0
	(Czech Republic) Pierre Coppa	Yamaha							25						0
	(Spain) Borja Quero	Yamaha									NC				0
	(Netherlands) Glenn van Straalen	Kawasaki											Ret	Ret	0
	(France) Gaëtan Matern	Kawasaki										Ret			0
	(France) Maximilien Bau	Yamaha										Ret			0
	(Italy) Marco Muzio	Yamaha										Ret			0
	(Portugal) Ivo Lopes	Yamaha									Ret				0
	(Italy) Stefano Valtulini	Kawasaki								Ret					0
	(Hungary) Richárd Bódis	Kawasaki								Ret					0
	(Hungary) Gergő Molnár	Honda							Ret						0
	(United Kingdom) Ryan Vickers	Honda						Ret							0
	(Italy) Marco Malone	Kawasaki					Ret								0
	(Italy) Massimo Roccoli	Yamaha					Ret								0
Pos.	Rider	Bike	PHI (Australia)	CHA (Thailand)	ARA (Spain)	ASS (Netherlands)	IMO (Italy)	DON (United Kingdom)	BRN (Czech Republic)	MIS (Italy)	POR (Portugal)	MAG (France)	VIL (Argentina)	LOS (Qatar)	Pts

Colour	Result
Gold	Winner
Silver	Second place
Bronze	Third place
Green	Points classification
Blue	Non-points classification
Blue	Non-classified finish (NC)
Purple	Retired, not classified (Ret)
Red	Did not qualify (DNQ)
Red	Did not pre-qualify (DNPQ)
Black	Disqualified (DSQ)
White	Did not start (DNS)
White	Withdrew (WD)
White	Race cancelled (C)
Blank	Did not practice (DNP)
Blank	Did not arrive (DNA)
Blank	Excluded (EX)

**Bold** – Pole position
Italics – Fastest lap

=== Teams' championship ===
Pos.	Teams	Bike No.	PHI (Australia)	CHA (Thailand)	ARA (Spain)	ASS (Netherlands)	IMO (Italy)	DON (United Kingdom)	BRN (Czech Republic)	MIS (Italy)	POR (Portugal)	MAG (France)	VIL (Argentina)	LOS (Qatar)	Pts.
2	(Italy) GRT Yamaha Official WorldSSP Team	144	**1**	**2**	4	4	**8**	5	4	Ret	**1**	3	**3**	**1**	330
2	(Italy) GRT Yamaha Official WorldSSP Team	64	4	3	2	Ret	2	6	Ret	**1**	2	**13**	Ret	3	330
2	(Italy) GRT Yamaha Official WorldSSP Team	15			Ret	20	19	19	14	23	19	25			330
2	(India) NRT	16	7	Ret	3	1	1	**2**	1	4	Ret	1	1	Ret	269
2	(India) NRT	36	10	11	23	9	12	8	6	Ret	9	4	4	4	269
3	(Finland) Kallio Racing	11	3	4	**1**	**6**	4	1	**2**	3	6	2	2	2	248
3	(Finland) Kallio Racing	84	12	13	12	10	13	12	10	Ret	DNS	18	10	12	248
4	(Italy) MV Agusta Reparto Corse by Vamag	3	6	7	Ret	3	3	3	3	2	4	7	Ret	8	182
4	(Italy) MV Agusta Reparto Corse by Vamag	86	9	15	Ret	12	Ret	7	Ret	10	8	12	11	11	182
5	(Italy) Bardahl Evan Bros. WorldSSP Team	21	2	1	11	2	5	4	5	5	5	5	6	5	159
6	(United Kingdom) CIA Landlord Insurance Honda	111							8	7	3	8	7	Ret	108
6	(United Kingdom) CIA Landlord Insurance Honda	66	11	9	8	7	7								108
6	(United Kingdom) CIA Landlord Insurance Honda	96		20	20	13	14	10	17						108
6	(United Kingdom) CIA Landlord Insurance Honda	56								17	Ret	14	15	10	108
6	(United Kingdom) CIA Landlord Insurance Honda	61						Ret							108
7	(Italy) Kawasaki Puccetti Racing	78	14	19	Ret	Ret	10	Ret	13	9	10	9	8	Ret	85
7	(Italy) Kawasaki Puccetti Racing	98									11	10	9	7	85
7	(Italy) Kawasaki Puccetti Racing	32			7	Ret		9	Ret	Ret					85
7	(Italy) Kawasaki Puccetti Racing	54	13				Ret								85
7	(Italy) Kawasaki Puccetti Racing	25		16											85
7	(Italy) Kawasaki Puccetti Racing	50									18				85
8	(United Kingdom) Profile Racing	81	5	10	6	5	9	16	18	14	12	15	12	Ret	61
8	(United Kingdom) Profile Racing	4		12											61
8	(United Kingdom) Profile Racing	35	DNS		15	16	23	17	Ret	Ret					61
8	(United Kingdom) Profile Racing	49									16	21	17	Ret	61
9	(Netherlands) EAB antwest Racing	13	Ret	6	9	DNS	6	11	7	6					51
9	(Netherlands) EAB antwest Racing	33										22			51
9	(Netherlands) EAB antwest Racing	51											Ret	Ret	51
10	(Italy) Gemar Team Lorini	111	8	Ret	5	Ret	24	13							28
10	(Italy) Gemar Team Lorini	74	16	21	19	Ret	Ret	Ret	DNS	22	14	Ret	18	13	28
10	(Italy) Gemar Team Lorini	19							15	Ret					28
10	(Italy) Gemar Team Lorini	12									Ret	26	19	16	28
11	(France) GMT94 Yamaha	6			16			15		12	Ret	6	5	6	36
11	(France) GMT94 Yamaha	94	17	18											36
12	(Estonia) Racedays	38	Ret	17	18	11	16	14	12	15	7	11	13	9	36
13	(Netherlands) Team Hartog – Against Cancer	47			10	8	11	Ret	11	13	DSQ	17			27
14	Core Kawasaki Thailand Racing Team	99		5											11
15	(Finland) Sterkman Motorsport by HRP	22			13	15	Ret	18	9	Ret					11
16	Yamaha Thailand Racing Team	5		8											10
16	Yamaha Thailand Racing Team	24		14											10
17	(Italy) G.A.S. Racing Team	60					20			8					8
17	(Italy) G.A.S. Racing Team	55					Ret								8
18	(Italy) Team GoEleven Kawasaki	88								Ret	15	16	14	14	7
18	(Italy) Team GoEleven Kawasaki	65	Ret		14	Ret	18	21							7
18	(Italy) Team GoEleven Kawasaki	34					Ret	22	23	21	17	20	16	Ret	7
18	(Italy) Team GoEleven Kawasaki	29		22											7
18	(Italy) Team GoEleven Kawasaki	44							22						7
18	(Italy) Team GoEleven Kawasaki	83	Ret	Ret	24	Ret									7
19	(Italy) Team Rosso Corsa	42								11					5
20	(Spain) H43 Team Nobby Denson	70									13				3
21	(Belgium) Chromeburner Wayne's Racingteam MtM	77			22	14	21	20	20	20	Ret	19			2
22	(Spain) Orelac Racing VerdNatura	10	18	Ret	17	17	22	Ret	21	Ret	Ret	24	20	15	1
23	(Australia) Cube Racing	7	15												1
24	(Italy) Renzi Corse	53					15								1
	(Italy) Floramo Monaco Racing Team	65							16						0
	(Italy) Extreme Racing Bardahl	63					DNS			16					0
	Nordfilm Packaging SSP Hungary Racing	56			21	19	17								0
	Nordfilm Packaging SSP Hungary Racing	97								Ret					0
	(Netherlands) Benro Racing	62				18									0
	(Italy) Scuderia Improve – Firenze Motor	93								18					0
	(Germany) Freudenberg World SSP Team	23							19						0
	(Italy) Team Rosso e Nero	65								19					0
	(Finland) Paukku Racing	82										23			0
	(Czech Republic) Czech Road Racing Team Chalupari	14							24						0
	(Czech Republic) Motor Village 69 Racing	69							25						0
	(Spain) Emperador Racing Team	39									NC				0
	(Italy) Team Greenspeed	52					Ret								0
	(Hungary) VEPP Racing	48							Ret						0
	(Italy) Pleo Racing Team	43								Ret					0
	(Portugal) ENI_Motor7_Pequeno Motos	75									Ret				0
	(Italy) The BlackSheep Team	71										Ret			0
	(France) MAXIGP108	80										Ret			0
	(France) Flembbo Leader Team	67										Ret			0
Pos.	Teams	Bike No.	PHI (Australia)	CHA (Thailand)	ARA (Spain)	ASS (Netherlands)	IMO (Italy)	DON (United Kingdom)	BRN (Czech Republic)	MIS (Italy)	POR (Portugal)	MAG (France)	VIL (Argentina)	LOS (Qatar)	Pts.

=== Manufacturers' championship ===
Pos.	Manufacturer	PHI (Australia)	CHA (Thailand)	ARA (Spain)	ASS (Netherlands)	IMO (Italy)	DON (United Kingdom)	BRN (Czech Republic)	MIS (Italy)	POR (Portugal)	MAG (France)	VIL (Argentina)	LOS (Qatar)	Pts
1	(Japan) Yamaha	1	1	1	1	1	1	1	1	1	1	1	1	300
2	(Italy) MV Agusta	6	7	Ret	3	3	3	3	2	4	7	11	8	138
3	(Japan) Honda	8	9	5	7	7	10	8	7	3	8	7	9	107
4	(Japan) Kawasaki	13	5	7	8	6	9	7	6	10	9	8	7	97
5	(United Kingdom) Triumph	5	10	6	5	9	17	Ret	Ret	16	21	17	Ret	45
6	(Japan) Suzuki			13	15	Ret	18	9	Ret					11
Pos.	Manufacturer	PHI (Australia)	CHA (Thailand)	ARA (Spain)	ASS (Netherlands)	IMO (Italy)	DON (United Kingdom)	BRN (Czech Republic)	MIS (Italy)	POR (Portugal)	MAG (France)	VIL (Argentina)	LOS (Qatar)	Pts
