= 2013 Malaysian motorcycle Grand Prix =

(Malaysia) 2013 Malaysian Grand Prix
Race details
- Race 15 of 18 races in the 2013 Grand Prix motorcycle racing season
- Date: 13 October 2013
- Official name: Shell Advance Malaysian Motorcycle Grand Prix
- Location: Sepang International Circuit
- Course: Permanent racing facility; 5.543 km (3.444 mi)

MotoGP
Pole position
Rider	(Spain) Marc Márquez	Honda
Time	2:00.011	
Fastest lap
Rider	(Spain) Marc Márquez	Honda
Time	2:01.145 on lap 2	
Podium
First	(Spain) Dani Pedrosa	Honda
Second	(Spain) Marc Márquez	Honda
Third	(Spain) Jorge Lorenzo	Yamaha

Moto2
Pole position
Rider	(Spain) Esteve Rabat	Kalex
Time	2:07.063	
Fastest lap
Rider	(Finland) Mika Kallio	Kalex
Time	2:07.959 on lap 3	
Podium
First	(Spain) Esteve Rabat	Kalex
Second	(Spain) Pol Espargaró	Kalex
Third	(Switzerland) Thomas Lüthi	Suter

Moto3
Pole position
Rider	(Spain) Luis Salom	KTM
Time	2:13.867	
Fastest lap
Rider	(Portugal) Miguel Oliveira	Mahindra
Time	2:14.339 on lap 3	
Podium
First	(Spain) Luis Salom	KTM
Second	(Spain) Álex Rins	KTM
Third	(Portugal) Miguel Oliveira	Mahindra

The 2013 Malaysian motorcycle Grand Prix was the fifteenth round of the 2013 MotoGP season. It was held at the Sepang International Circuit in Sepang on 13 October 2013.

Spain's Ana Carrasco became the first female rider to score a point since Katja Poensgen at the 2001 Italian Grand Prix, and the first in the Moto3 class. The predecessor 125cc class had its last point scored by a female rider, Tomoko Igata at the 1995 Czech Republic Grand Prix. This also marked the final Grand Prix win in the career of Luis Salom before his death 3 years later at the 2016 Catalan Grand Prix after suffering a fatal crash in the second free practice session.

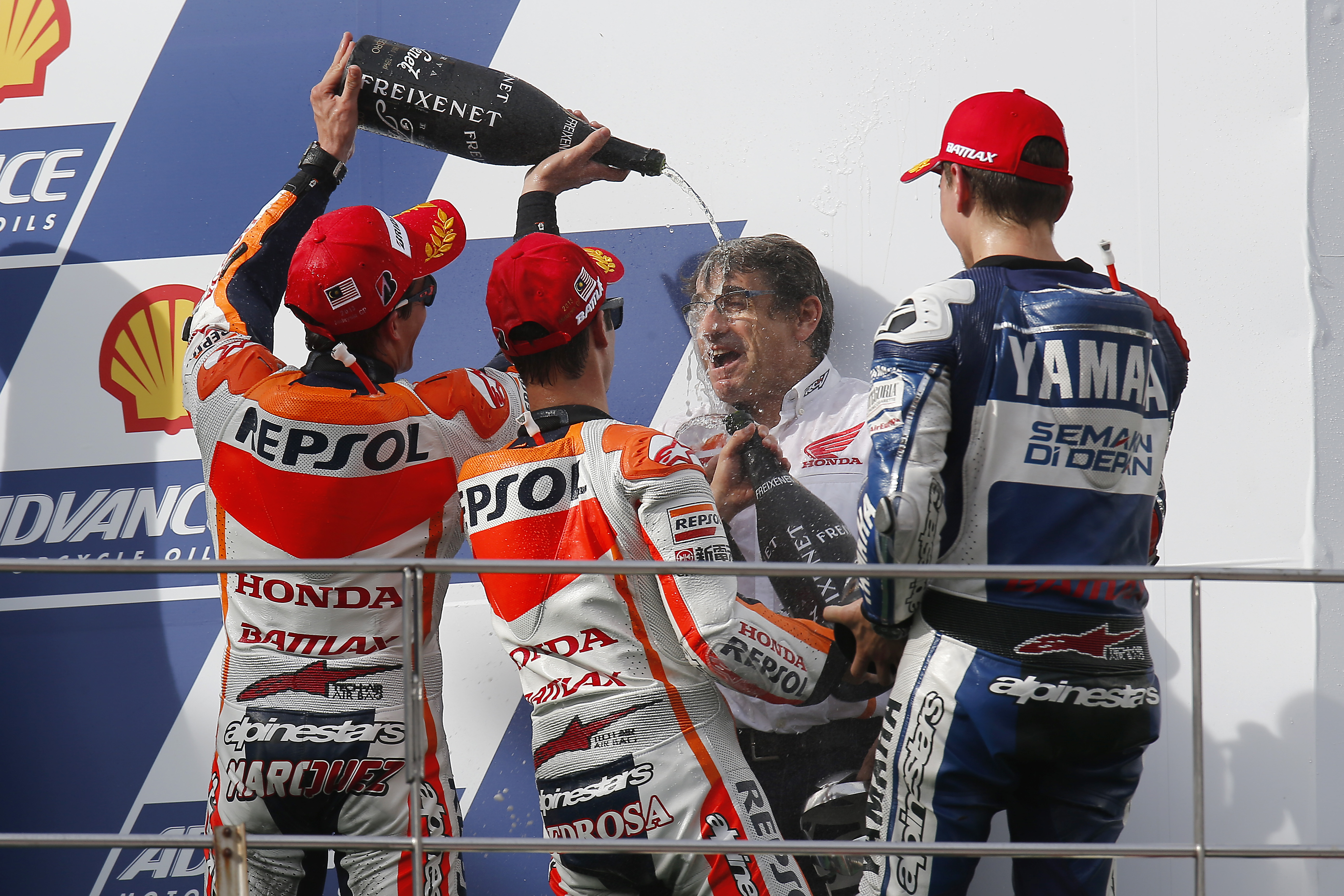
Marc Márquez, Dani Pedrosa and Jorge Lorenzo, celebrating on the podium after finishing second, first and third at the MotoGP race.

== Classification ==
=== MotoGP ===
Pos.	No.	Rider	Team	Manufacturer	Laps	Time/Retired	Grid	Points
1	26	(Spain) Dani Pedrosa	Repsol Honda Team	Honda	20	40:45.191	5	25
2	93	(Spain) Marc Márquez	Repsol Honda Team	Honda	20	+2.757	1	20
3	99	(Spain) Jorge Lorenzo	Yamaha Factory Racing	Yamaha	20	+6.669	4	16
4	46	(Italy) Valentino Rossi	Yamaha Factory Racing	Yamaha	20	+10.351	2	13
5	19	(Spain) Álvaro Bautista	Go&Fun Honda Gresini	Honda	20	+22.149	6	11
6	35	(United Kingdom) Cal Crutchlow	Monster Yamaha Tech 3	Yamaha	20	+22.301	3	10
7	38	(United Kingdom) Bradley Smith	Monster Yamaha Tech 3	Yamaha	20	+30.864	7	9
8	4	(Italy) Andrea Dovizioso	Ducati Team	Ducati	20	+45.111	8	8
9	41	(Spain) Aleix Espargaró	Power Electronics Aspar	ART	20	+59.264	9	7
10	68	(Colombia) Yonny Hernández	Ignite Pramac Racing	Ducati	20	+1:01.417	16	6
11	7	(Japan) Hiroshi Aoyama	Avintia Blusens	FTR	20	+1:03.665	15	5
12	14	(France) Randy de Puniet	Power Electronics Aspar	ART	20	+1:14.256	17	4
13	71	(Italy) Claudio Corti	NGM Mobile Forward Racing	FTR Kawasaki	20	+1:21.603	13	3
14	8	(Spain) Héctor Barberá	Avintia Blusens	FTR	20	+1:27.976	14	2
15	5	(United States) Colin Edwards	NGM Mobile Forward Racing	FTR Kawasaki	20	+1:29.442	12	1
16	9	(Italy) Danilo Petrucci	Came IodaRacing Project	Ioda-Suter	20	+1:29.551	19	
17	23	(Italy) Luca Scassa	Cardion AB Motoracing	ART	20	+1:47.930	20	
18	67	(Australia) Bryan Staring	Go&Fun Honda Gresini	FTR Honda	20	+1:52.927	21	
Ret	70	(United Kingdom) Michael Laverty	Paul Bird Motorsport	ART	12	Accident	18	
Ret	52	(Czech Republic) Lukáš Pešek	Came IodaRacing Project	Ioda-Suter	11	Retirement	22	
Ret	69	(United States) Nicky Hayden	Ducati Team	Ducati	8	Engine	11	
Ret	50	(Australia) Damian Cudlin	Paul Bird Motorsport	PBM	7	Exhaust	23	
Ret	29	(Italy) Andrea Iannone	Energy T.I. Pramac Racing	Ducati	6	Retirement	10	
DNS	6	(Germany) Stefan Bradl	LCR Honda MotoGP	Honda		Injured		

=== Moto2 ===
The first attempt to run the race was interrupted on the opening lap, following an incident involving Axel Pons, Fadli Immammuddin, who collected Pons's crashed bike, and then Ezequiel Iturrioz, Zaqhwan Zaidi and Decha Kraisart. For the restart, the race distance was reduced from 19 to 12 laps.

Pos	No	Rider	Manufacturer	Laps	Time/Retired	Grid	Points
1	80	(Spain) Esteve Rabat	Kalex	12	25:45.411	1	25
2	40	(Spain) Pol Espargaró	Kalex	12	+1.563	3	20
3	12	(Switzerland) Thomas Lüthi	Suter	12	+2.910	2	16
4	36	(Finland) Mika Kallio	Kalex	12	+4.814	5	13
5	77	(Switzerland) Dominique Aegerter	Suter	12	+7.352	11	11
6	5	(France) Johann Zarco	Suter	12	+9.790	4	10
7	45	(United Kingdom) Scott Redding	Kalex	12	+9.840	10	9
8	30	(Japan) Takaaki Nakagami	Kalex	12	+11.894	6	8
9	81	(Spain) Jordi Torres	Suter	12	+12.302	9	7
10	60	(Spain) Julián Simón	Kalex	12	+15.524	17	6
11	3	(Italy) Simone Corsi	Speed Up	12	+16.190	15	5
12	52	(United Kingdom) Danny Kent	Tech 3	12	+25.191	16	4
13	88	(Spain) Ricard Cardús	Speed Up	12	+26.040	21	3
14	23	(Germany) Marcel Schrötter	Kalex	12	+26.380	12	2
15	55	(Malaysia) Hafizh Syahrin	Kalex	12	+29.369	18	1
16	96	(France) Louis Rossi	Tech 3	12	+30.154	22	
17	8	(United Kingdom) Gino Rea	Speed Up	12	+35.653	25	
18	18	(Spain) Nicolás Terol	Suter	12	+35.723	14	
19	92	(Spain) Álex Mariñelarena	Kalex	12	+36.012	24	
20	44	(South Africa) Steven Odendaal	Speed Up	12	+40.132	29	
21	25	(Malaysia) Azlan Shah	Moriwaki	12	+40.457	27	
22	7	(Indonesia) Doni Tata Pradita	Suter	12	+50.037	28	
23	10	(Thailand) Thitipong Warokorn	Suter	12	+54.131	30	
24	97	(Indonesia) Rafid Topan Sucipto	Speed Up	12	+54.451	33	
DSQ	95	(Australia) Anthony West	Speed Up	12	(+25.982)	23	
Ret	11	(Germany) Sandro Cortese	Kalex	11	Accident	13	
Ret	54	(Italy) Mattia Pasini	Speed Up	9	Retirement	19	
Ret	15	(San Marino) Alex de Angelis	Speed Up	0	Accident	7	
Ret	19	(Belgium) Xavier Siméon	Kalex	0	Accident	8	
DNS	49	(Spain) Axel Pons	Kalex		Did not restart	20	
DNS	46	(Thailand) Decha Kraisart	Tech 3		Did not restart	26	
DNS	62	(Indonesia) Fadli Immammuddin	Motobi		Did not restart	31	
DNS	21	(Malaysia) Zaqhwan Zaidi	Suter		Did not restart	32	
DNS	34	(Argentina) Ezequiel Iturrioz	Kalex		Did not restart	34	
OFFICIAL MOTO2 REPORT

=== Moto3 ===
Pos	No	Rider	Manufacturer	Laps	Time/Retired	Grid	Points
1	39	(Spain) Luis Salom	KTM	18	40:42.441	1	25
2	42	(Spain) Álex Rins	KTM	18	+0.069	6	20
3	44	(Portugal) Miguel Oliveira	Mahindra	18	+0.408	4	16
4	12	(Spain) Álex Márquez	KTM	18	+0.782	5	13
5	25	(Spain) Maverick Viñales	KTM	18	+1.055	9	11
6	8	(Australia) Jack Miller	FTR Honda	18	+1.077	7	10
7	10	(France) Alexis Masbou	FTR Honda	18	+5.016	2	9
8	94	(Germany) Jonas Folger	Kalex KTM	18	+6.277	10	8
9	5	(Italy) Romano Fenati	FTR Honda	18	+6.952	13	7
10	65	(Germany) Philipp Öttl	Kalex KTM	18	+10.962	12	6
11	41	(South Africa) Brad Binder	Mahindra	18	+11.096	21	5
12	31	(Finland) Niklas Ajo	KTM	18	+21.012	14	4
13	84	(Czech Republic) Jakub Kornfeil	Kalex KTM	18	+29.443	11	3
14	32	(Spain) Isaac Viñales	FTR Honda	18	+31.541	17	2
15	22	(Spain) Ana Carrasco	KTM	18	+31.579	19	1
16	4	(Italy) Francesco Bagnaia	FTR Honda	18	+31.695	32	
17	17	(United Kingdom) John McPhee	FTR Honda	18	+32.058	20	
18	11	(Belgium) Livio Loi	Kalex KTM	18	+32.469	15	
19	61	(Australia) Arthur Sissis	KTM	18	+34.809	18	
20	21	(Germany) Luca Amato	Mahindra	18	+35.240	28	
21	58	(Spain) Juan Francisco Guevara	TSR Honda	18	+35.572	29	
22	29	(Japan) Hyuga Watanabe	FTR Honda	18	+37.079	27	
23	77	(Italy) Lorenzo Baldassarri	FTR Honda	18	+41.482	26	
24	57	(Brazil) Eric Granado	Kalex KTM	18	+1:01.040	16	
Ret	23	(Italy) Niccolò Antonelli	FTR Honda	7	Accident	3	
Ret	3	(Italy) Matteo Ferrari	FTR Honda	7	Retirement	23	
Ret	7	(Spain) Efrén Vázquez	Mahindra	7	Retirement	8	
Ret	9	(Germany) Toni Finsterbusch	Kalex KTM	5	Accident	24	
Ret	79	(Malaysia) Aizat Malik	KTM	3	Accident	31	
Ret	80	(Malaysia) Hafiq Azmi	KTM	1	Accident	30	
Ret	89	(France) Alan Techer	TSR Honda	0	Accident	22	
Ret	53	(Netherlands) Jasper Iwema	Kalex KTM	0	Accident	25	
DNS	63	(Malaysia) Zulfahmi Khairuddin	KTM		Injured		
DNS	19	(Italy) Alessandro Tonucci	FTR Honda		Injured		
DNS	66	(Germany) Florian Alt	Kalex KTM		Injured		
OFFICIAL MOTO3 REPORT

== Championship standings after the race (MotoGP) ==
Below are the standings for the top five riders and constructors after round fifteen has concluded.

Riders' Championship standings

Pos.	Rider	Points
1	(Spain) Marc Márquez	298
2	(Spain) Jorge Lorenzo	255
3	(Spain) Dani Pedrosa	244
4	(Italy) Valentino Rossi	198
5	(United Kingdom) Cal Crutchlow	166

Constructors' Championship standings

Pos.	Constructor	Points
1	(Japan) Honda	329
2	(Japan) Yamaha	306
3	(Italy) Ducati	131
4	(Italy) ART	85
5	(United Kingdom) FTR	40

Notes:

- Only the top five positions are included for both sets of standings.
- ^{1} All points from the race victory for Marc Márquez were deducted as a result of a decision from Race Direction, after Márquez collided with teammate Dani Pedrosa during the race. Honda's next-best finisher was Álvaro Bautista, who scored a fourth-place finish.

Previous race: 2013 Aragon Grand Prix	FIM Grand Prix World Championship; 2013 season	Next race: 2013 Australian Grand Prix
Previous race: 2012 Malaysian Grand Prix	Malaysian motorcycle Grand Prix	Next race: 2014 Malaysian Grand Prix
