= 2013 Japanese motorcycle Grand Prix =

(Japan) 2013 Japanese Grand Prix
Race details
- Race 17 of 18 races in the 2013 Grand Prix motorcycle racing season
- Date: 27 October 2013
- Official name: AirAsia Grand Prix of Japan
- Location: Twin Ring Motegi
- Course: Permanent racing facility; 4.801 km (2.983 mi)

MotoGP
Pole position
Rider	(Spain) Jorge Lorenzo	Yamaha
Time	1:53.471	
Fastest lap
Rider	(Spain) Jorge Lorenzo	Yamaha
Time	1:45.736 on lap 16	
Podium
First	(Spain) Jorge Lorenzo	Yamaha
Second	(Spain) Marc Márquez	Honda
Third	(Spain) Dani Pedrosa	Honda

Moto2
Pole position
Rider	(Finland) Mika Kallio	Kalex
Time	2:01.248	
Fastest lap
Rider	(Spain) Pol Espargaró	Kalex
Time	1:52.028 on lap 9	
Podium
First	(Spain) Pol Espargaró	Kalex
Second	(Finland) Mika Kallio	Kalex
Third	(Switzerland) Thomas Lüthi	Suter

Moto3
Pole position
Rider	(Spain) Álex Rins	KTM
Time	2:09.387	
Fastest lap
Rider	(Spain) Álex Márquez	KTM
Time	1:58.380 on lap 11	
Podium
First	(Spain) Álex Márquez	KTM
Second	(Spain) Maverick Viñales	KTM
Third	(Germany) Jonas Folger	Kalex KTM

The 2013 Japanese motorcycle Grand Prix was the seventeenth round of the 2013 MotoGP season. It was held at the Twin Ring Motegi in Motegi on 27 October 2013. Jorge Lorenzo won the MotoGP race to gain Yamaha its 200th victory in the 500cc/MotoGP class. Pol Espargaró clinched the Moto2 world title after title contenders Scott Redding and Esteve Rabat crashed out in the race.

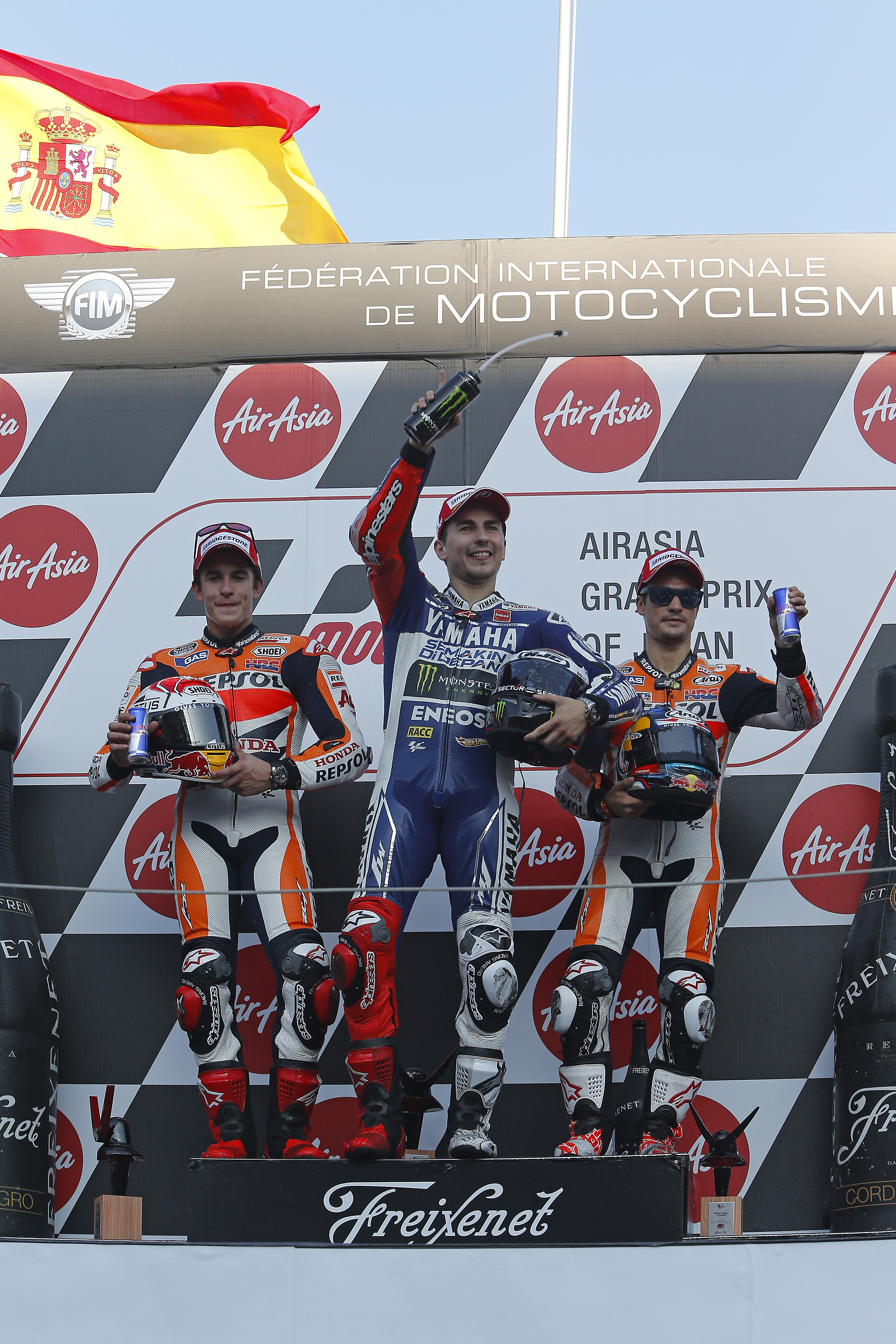
Marc Márquez, Jorge Lorenzo and Dani Pedrosa, celebrating on the podium after finishing second, first and third at the MotoGP race.

== Classification ==
=== MotoGP ===
Pos.	No.	Rider	Team	Manufacturer	Laps	Time/Retired	Grid	Points
1	99	(Spain) Jorge Lorenzo	Yamaha Factory Racing	Yamaha	24	42:34.291	1	25
2	93	(Spain) Marc Márquez	Repsol Honda Team	Honda	24	+3.188	2	20
3	26	(Spain) Dani Pedrosa	Repsol Honda Team	Honda	24	+4.592	4	16
4	19	(Spain) Álvaro Bautista	Go&Fun Honda Gresini	Honda	24	+19.755	7	13
5	6	(Germany) Stefan Bradl	LCR Honda MotoGP	Honda	24	+22.810	8	11
6	46	(Italy) Valentino Rossi	Yamaha Factory Racing	Yamaha	24	+24.637	5	10
7	35	(United Kingdom) Cal Crutchlow	Monster Yamaha Tech 3	Yamaha	24	+27.496	11	9
8	38	(United Kingdom) Bradley Smith	Monster Yamaha Tech 3	Yamaha	24	+30.969	13	8
9	69	(United States) Nicky Hayden	Ducati Team	Ducati	24	+37.010	3	7
10	4	(Italy) Andrea Dovizioso	Ducati Team	Ducati	24	+42.944	6	6
11	21	(Japan) Katsuyuki Nakasuga	Yamaha YSP Racing Team	Yamaha	24	+53.345	12	5
12	5	(United States) Colin Edwards	NGM Mobile Forward Racing	FTR Kawasaki	24	+1:03.213	14	4
13	14	(France) Randy de Puniet	Power Electronics Aspar	ART	24	+1:06.840	17	3
14	29	(Italy) Andrea Iannone	Energy T.I. Pramac Racing	Ducati	24	+1:08.218	15	2
15	68	(Colombia) Yonny Hernández	Ignite Pramac Racing	Ducati	24	+1:18.240	10	1
16	8	(Spain) Héctor Barberá	Avintia Blusens	FTR	24	+1:19.108	22	
17	7	(Japan) Hiroshi Aoyama	Avintia Blusens	FTR	24	+1:21.174	18	
18	9	(Italy) Danilo Petrucci	Came IodaRacing Project	Ioda-Suter	24	+1:30.546	16	
19	70	(United Kingdom) Michael Laverty	Paul Bird Motorsport	ART	24	+2:23.358	19	
20	71	(Italy) Claudio Corti	NGM Mobile Forward Racing	FTR Kawasaki	23	+1 lap	21	
21	50	(Australia) Damian Cudlin	Paul Bird Motorsport	PBM	23	+1 lap	23	
22	67	(Australia) Bryan Staring	Go&Fun Honda Gresini	FTR Honda	23	+1 lap	24	
Ret	41	(Spain) Aleix Espargaró	Power Electronics Aspar	ART	12	Accident	9	
Ret	23	(Italy) Luca Scassa	Cardion AB Motoracing	ART	1	Retirement	20	
Ret	52	(Czech Republic) Lukáš Pešek	Came IodaRacing Project	Ioda-Suter	1	Retirement	25	

=== Moto2 ===
The first attempt to run the race was interrupted on the opening lap, following an incident involving Scott Redding, Álex Mariñelarena and Esteve Rabat. For the restart, the race distance was reduced from 23 to 15 laps.

Pos	No	Rider	Manufacturer	Laps	Time/Retired	Grid	Points
1	40	(Spain) Pol Espargaró	Kalex	15	28:15.162	7	25
2	36	(Finland) Mika Kallio	Kalex	15	+1.344	1	20
3	12	(Switzerland) Thomas Lüthi	Suter	15	+3.379	12	16
4	19	(Belgium) Xavier Siméon	Kalex	15	+8.420	2	13
5	60	(Spain) Julián Simón	Kalex	15	+10.315	19	11
6	18	(Spain) Nicolás Terol	Suter	15	+11.364	24	10
7	15	(San Marino) Alex de Angelis	Speed Up	15	+12.718	21	9
8	77	(Switzerland) Dominique Aegerter	Suter	15	+15.609	8	8
9	30	(Japan) Takaaki Nakagami	Kalex	15	+18.414	22	7
10	54	(Italy) Mattia Pasini	Speed Up	15	+20.679	9	6
11	95	(Australia) Anthony West	Speed Up	15	+30.759	17	5
12	23	(Germany) Marcel Schrötter	Kalex	15	+31.134	20	4
13	49	(Spain) Axel Pons	Kalex	15	+31.335	23	3
14	8	(United Kingdom) Gino Rea	Speed Up	15	+31.505	13	2
15	11	(Germany) Sandro Cortese	Kalex	15	+31.801	11	1
16	31	(Japan) Kohta Nozane	TSR	15	+41.840	28	
17	88	(Spain) Ricard Cardús	Speed Up	15	+46.192	18	
18	94	(Italy) Franco Morbidelli	Suter	15	+51.771	25	
19	44	(South Africa) Steven Odendaal	Speed Up	15	+54.433	32	
20	35	(Japan) Tetsuta Nagashima	Motobi	15	+55.138	15	
21	46	(Thailand) Decha Kraisart	Tech 3	15	+55.181	29	
22	34	(Argentina) Ezequiel Iturrioz	Kalex	15	+1:03.592	30	
23	25	(Malaysia) Azlan Shah	Moriwaki	15	+1:32.681	26	
Ret	97	(Indonesia) Rafid Topan Sucipto	Speed Up	11	Accident	5	
Ret	5	(France) Johann Zarco	Suter	9	Retirement	3	
Ret	81	(Spain) Jordi Torres	Suter	8	Accident	16	
Ret	96	(France) Louis Rossi	Tech 3	8	Retirement	27	
Ret	7	(Indonesia) Doni Tata Pradita	Suter	2	Accident	31	
Ret	3	(Italy) Simone Corsi	Speed Up	1	Accident	4	
DNS	80	(Spain) Esteve Rabat	Kalex	0	Did not restart	6	
DNS	92	(Spain) Álex Mariñelarena	Kalex	0	Did not restart	10	
DNS	45	(United Kingdom) Scott Redding	Kalex	0	Did not restart	14	
DNS	52	(United Kingdom) Danny Kent	Tech 3		Injured		
OFFICIAL MOTO2 REPORT

=== Moto3 ===
Pos	No	Rider	Manufacturer	Laps	Time/Retired	Grid	Points
1	12	(Spain) Álex Márquez	KTM	20	39:45.953	3	25
2	25	(Spain) Maverick Viñales	KTM	20	+0.027	2	20
3	94	(Germany) Jonas Folger	Kalex KTM	20	+7.750	9	16
4	44	(Portugal) Miguel Oliveira	Mahindra	20	+15.889	18	13
5	5	(Italy) Romano Fenati	FTR Honda	20	+18.323	26	11
6	8	(Australia) Jack Miller	FTR Honda	20	+18.432	5	10
7	17	(United Kingdom) John McPhee	FTR Honda	20	+18.439	22	9
8	31	(Finland) Niklas Ajo	KTM	20	+25.608	17	8
9	23	(Italy) Niccolò Antonelli	FTR Honda	20	+25.950	7	7
10	41	(South Africa) Brad Binder	Mahindra	20	+32.933	15	6
11	84	(Czech Republic) Jakub Kornfeil	Kalex KTM	20	+33.067	16	5
12	11	(Belgium) Livio Loi	Kalex KTM	20	+33.231	25	4
13	65	(Germany) Philipp Öttl	Kalex KTM	20	+33.668	32	3
14	89	(France) Alan Techer	TSR Honda	20	+39.006	27	2
15	29	(Japan) Hyuga Watanabe	FTR Honda	20	+39.259	12	1
16	61	(Australia) Arthur Sissis	KTM	20	+42.159	19	
17	77	(Italy) Lorenzo Baldassarri	FTR Honda	20	+42.670	24	
18	22	(Spain) Ana Carrasco	KTM	20	+46.487	35	
19	57	(Brazil) Eric Granado	Kalex KTM	20	+47.005	31	
20	4	(Italy) Francesco Bagnaia	FTR Honda	20	+47.394	34	
21	9	(Germany) Toni Finsterbusch	Kalex KTM	20	+48.496	14	
22	58	(Spain) Juan Francisco Guevara	TSR Honda	20	+51.341	33	
23	33	(Japan) Sena Yamada	Honda	20	+1:00.508	10	
24	42	(Spain) Álex Rins	KTM	20	+1:06.878	1	
25	53	(Netherlands) Jasper Iwema	Kalex KTM	20	+1:10.254	11	
26	80	(Malaysia) Hafiq Azmi	FTR Honda	20	+1:13.522	28	
Ret	10	(France) Alexis Masbou	FTR Honda	19	Accident	20	
Ret	3	(Italy) Matteo Ferrari	FTR Honda	16	Retirement	30	
Ret	21	(Germany) Luca Amato	Mahindra	14	Accident	29	
Ret	39	(Spain) Luis Salom	KTM	8	Accident	4	
Ret	91	(Japan) Hiroki Ono	Honda	1	Accident	8	
Ret	32	(Spain) Isaac Viñales	FTR Honda	0	Accident	6	
Ret	63	(Malaysia) Zulfahmi Khairuddin	KTM	0	Accident	13	
Ret	7	(Spain) Efrén Vázquez	Mahindra	0	Accident	21	
Ret	43	(Germany) Luca Grünwald	Kalex KTM	0	Accident	23	
OFFICIAL MOTO3 REPORT

== Championship standings after the race (MotoGP) ==
Below are the standings for the top five riders and constructors after round seventeen has concluded.

Riders' Championship standings

Pos.	Rider	Points
1	(Spain) Marc Márquez	318
2	(Spain) Jorge Lorenzo	305
3	(Spain) Dani Pedrosa	280
4	(Italy) Valentino Rossi	224
5	(United Kingdom) Cal Crutchlow	188

Constructors' Championship standings

Pos.	Constructor	Points
1	(Japan) Honda	369
2	(Japan) Yamaha	356
3	(Italy) Ducati	147
4	(Italy) ART	94
5	(United Kingdom) FTR Kawasaki	43

Notes:

- Only the top five positions are included for both sets of standings.
- ^{1} All points from the race victory for Marc Márquez were deducted as a result of a decision from Race Direction, after Márquez collided with teammate Dani Pedrosa during the race. Honda's next-best finisher was Álvaro Bautista, who scored a fourth-place finish.

Previous race: 2013 Australian Grand Prix	FIM Grand Prix World Championship; 2013 season	Next race: 2013 Valencian Grand Prix
Previous race: 2012 Japanese Grand Prix	Japanese motorcycle Grand Prix	Next race: 2014 Japanese Grand Prix
