= Kalex =

German specialty engineering company

Kalex Engineering GmbH
- Type: Private
- Industry: Transportation
- Founded: 2008
- Headquarters: Bobingen, Bavaria, Germany
- Key people: Klaus Hirsekorn, Alex Baumgärtel
- Products: Motorbikes
- Website: Kalex Engineering

Kalex Engineering is a German specialty engineering company that designs, manufactures and sells high-performance parts for motorcycles. Kalex Engineering was founded in 2008 in the Bavarian city of Bobingen, Germany by Klaus Hirsekorn and Alex Baumgärtel.

== Company history ==
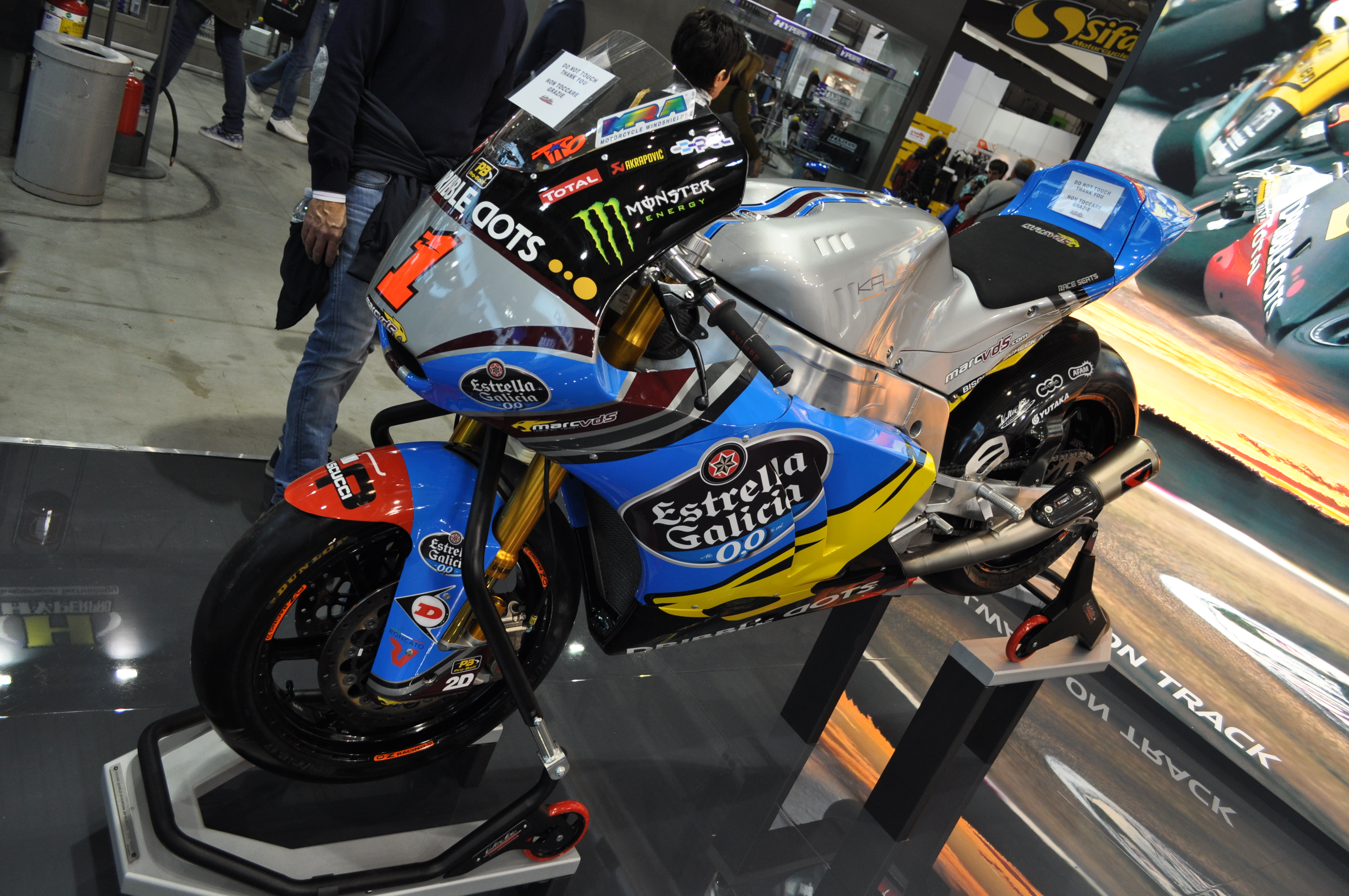
Kalex Moto2

The name of Kalex was created by merging the two first names of the company founders, Klaus Hirsekorn and Alex Baumgärtel.

In 2010, with the introduction of the new 600 cc Moto2 class using controlled Honda engines, Kalex Engineering began providing its chassis to the Pons Racing team. Stefan Bradl became the first rider to achieve a world title using a Kalex chassis when he won the 2011 Moto2 World Championship for the Viessmann Kiefer Racing team.

Kalex won the Manufacturers' Championship in 2013 when teams using their chassis finished in the top four places in the Championship. In 2015, Kalex riders won all but one race, and took the top three places and nine of the top ten places in the overall standings. Riders using the Kalex chassis dominated the 2016 season, winning all 18 rounds and taking the top nine positions in the season final standings.

Following the change to Moto2 engine supply by Triumph from 2019, older Kalex chassis designs will continue to be used in the British GP2 classification, run within the British Supersport Championship from 2018.

Kalex motorcycles are also currently in use in the FIM Moto2 European Championship, having won both the Riders' and Manufacturers' Championship multiple times.

== Grand Prix Racing Results ==
=== Moto2 Constructors' Championship Results ===
Season	Points	Position
2010	81	7th
2011	281	2nd
2012	320	2nd
2013	392	1st
2014	430	1st
2015	445	1st
2016	450	1st
2017	427	1st
2018	407	1st
2019	442	1st
2020	375	1st
2021	450	1st
2022	477.5	1st
2023	463	1st
2024	437	1st
2025	518	1st
2026		

In 2016, 2020 and 2021, Kalex machines have won all races in the season, achieving the maximum possible points total.

=== Moto2 Rider's Champions ===
Season	Rider	Points
2011	(Germany) Stefan Bradl	274
2013	(Spain) Pol Espargaró	265
2014	(Spain) Tito Rabat	346
2015	(France) Johann Zarco	352
2016	(France) Johann Zarco	276
2017	(Italy) Franco Morbidelli	308
2018	(Italy) Francesco Bagnaia	306
2019	(Spain) Álex Márquez	262
2020	(Italy) Enea Bastianini	205
2021	(Australia) Remy Gardner	311
2022	(Spain) Augusto Fernández	271.5
2023	(Spain) Pedro Acosta	332.5
2025	(Brazil) Diogo Moreira	286
