= CMRA (disambiguation) =

CMRA can mean:

- Commercial mail receiving agency, more commonly known as a "mail drop"
- Central Motorcycle Roadracing Association
- The Canadian Marine Rescue Auxiliary, a former name for the Canadian Coast Guard Auxiliary
