= Nicky Hayden =

American motorcycle racer

Nicholas Hayden
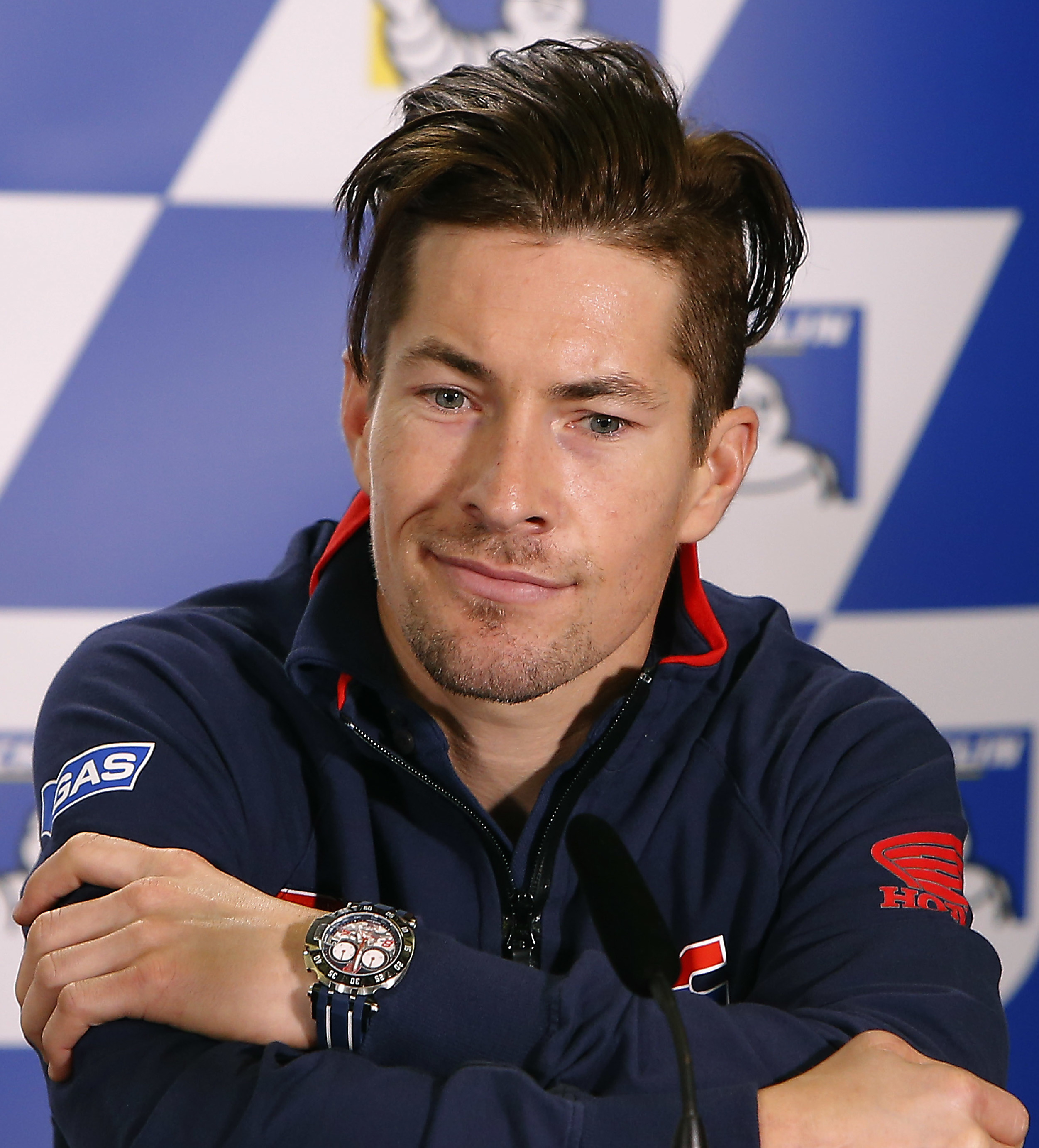
- Hayden in 2016
- Nationality: American
- Born: July 30, 1981; Owensboro, Kentucky, U.S.
- Died: May 22, 2017 (aged 35); Cesena, Italy
- Bike number: 69 (retired in honor in the MotoGP class)
- Website: nickyhayden.com
Motorcycle racing career statistics
MotoGP World Championship
| Active years | 2003–2016 |
| Manufacturers | Honda (2003–2008, 2014–2016); Ducati (2009–2013) |
| Championships | 1 (2006) |
| 2016 championship position | 26th (1 pts) |
Starts / Wins / Podiums / Poles / F. laps / Points; 218 / 3 / 28 / 5 / 7 / 1698
Superbike World Championship
| Active years | 2002, 2016–2017 |
| Manufacturers | Honda |
| Championships | 0 |
| 2017 championship position | 17th (40 pts) |
Starts / Wins / Podiums / Poles / F. laps / Points; 38 / 1 / 4 / 0 / 0 / 304
Supersport World Championship
| Active years | 1998 |
| Manufacturers | Suzuki |
| Championships | 0 |
| 1998 championship position | NC (0 pts) |
Starts / Wins / Podiums / Poles / F. laps / Points; 1 / 0 / 0 / 0 / 0 / 0

Nicholas Patrick Hayden (July 30, 1981 – May 22, 2017), nicknamed "the Kentucky Kid", was an American professional motorcycle racer who won the MotoGP World Championship in 2006. Hayden began racing motorcycles at a young age. He began his road racing career in the CMRA before progressing to the AMA Supersport Championship and then to the AMA Superbike Championship. He won the AMA title in 2002 and was approached by the Repsol Honda team to race for them in MotoGP in 2003.

Hayden largely had mixed results in his first two seasons at Repsol Honda only getting four podiums. He then rallied in the 2005 season by scoring his first Grand Prix win at Laguna Seca, and finishing third in the standings at the end of the season. The next year, 2006, would be Hayden's best in motorcycle racing as he won the 2006 MotoGP world title, breaking Valentino Rossi's five-year consecutive streak. He remained with Honda for two more seasons without a win, before moving to Ducati for 2009. Hayden had five largely unsuccessful seasons at Ducati, with his highest championship position being a seventh place in 2010. He subsequently moved to the Honda Aspar team in 2014 where he raced for two seasons.

Hayden moved to the Superbike World Championship with the Ten Kate Racing Honda team in 2016. He finished fifth in his first season in the Superbike World Championship with the highlight of his season being a win in Malaysia. For 2017, Hayden continued with the Red Bull Honda team (formerly Ten Kate Racing team).

On May 17, 2017, Hayden was hit by a driver while riding his bicycle in Italy. He suffered a traumatic brain injury and died five days later in a local hospital. Hayden was posthumously inducted into the AMA Motorcycle Hall of Fame in 2018.

== Career ==
=== Early career ===
Hayden was born in Owensboro, Kentucky. He started road racing with the CMRA, often against racers many times older. Hayden would often start races from the back of the grid because a family or crew member would have to hold his bike upright as his feet would not yet touch the ground. Later, at age 17, he was racing factory Honda RC45 superbikes while still in high school.

In 1999, in just his second full season in the AMA Supersport Championship, Hayden won the title aboard a privateer Honda. In 2000 Hayden moved up to the AMA Superbike Championship, riding a Honda RC51 for the factory American Honda racing team. Despite it being his first full season on a 1000cc superbike, he finished second, losing out on the championship by only five points to multiple-time series champion Mat Mladin. In 2001, Hayden finished third, behind champion Mladin and runner-up Eric Bostrom. In the 2002 season, still riding the Honda RC51 superbike, he won the Daytona 200 en route to becoming the youngest ever AMA Superbike champion, defeating reigning triple champion Mladin, among others. He also entered the FIM World Superbike Championship round at Laguna Seca, earning a solid fourth-place finish in the first race before colliding with Noriyuki Haga in the second race, resulting in a 13th-place finish.

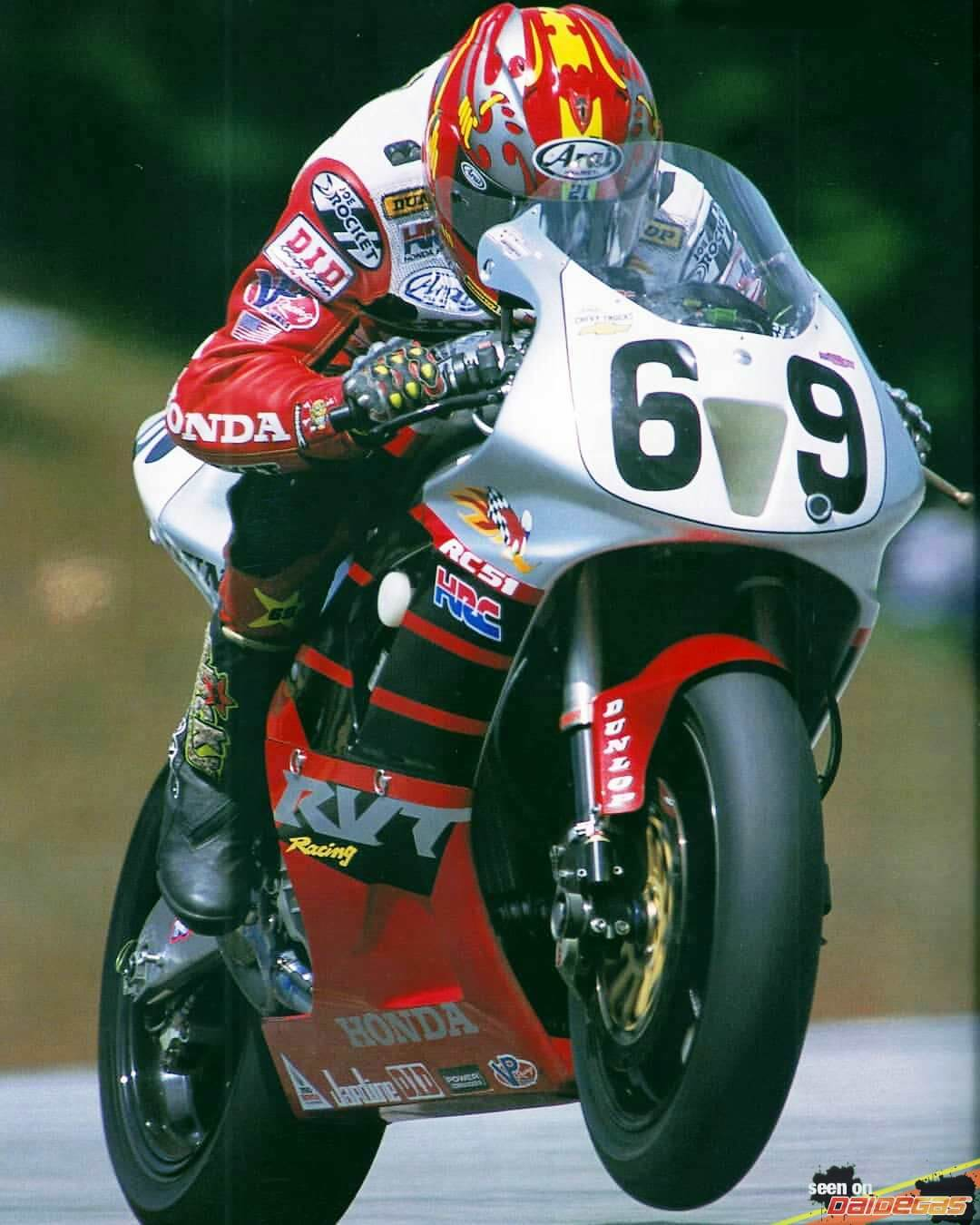
Nicky Hayden Honda RC51 Superbike

Hayden was one of a long line of American road racers to come from the American dirt-track scene. In 1999, Hayden won his first Grand National Championship race (Hagerstown Half Mile) and took Rookie of the Year honors. He was also declared the AMA's athlete of the Year. In 2000, Hayden won the Springfield Short Track. In 2002, despite racing in just a handful of dirt-track events, Hayden won four races: Springfield Short Track (twice), Springfield TT, and Peoria TT. At the Springfield TT race, the three Hayden brothers took the first three places (Nicky first, Tommy second, and Roger Lee third).

Hayden's win at the 2002 Peoria TT came after beating 13-time Peoria winner, Chris Carr, despite starting from the penalty line. Hayden only lacked a win at a mile track to join Dick Mann, Kenny Roberts, Bubba Shobert, and Doug Chandler in the prestigious "Grand Slam Club."

=== MotoGP World Championship ===
==== Honda (2003–2008) ====
===== 2003 =====
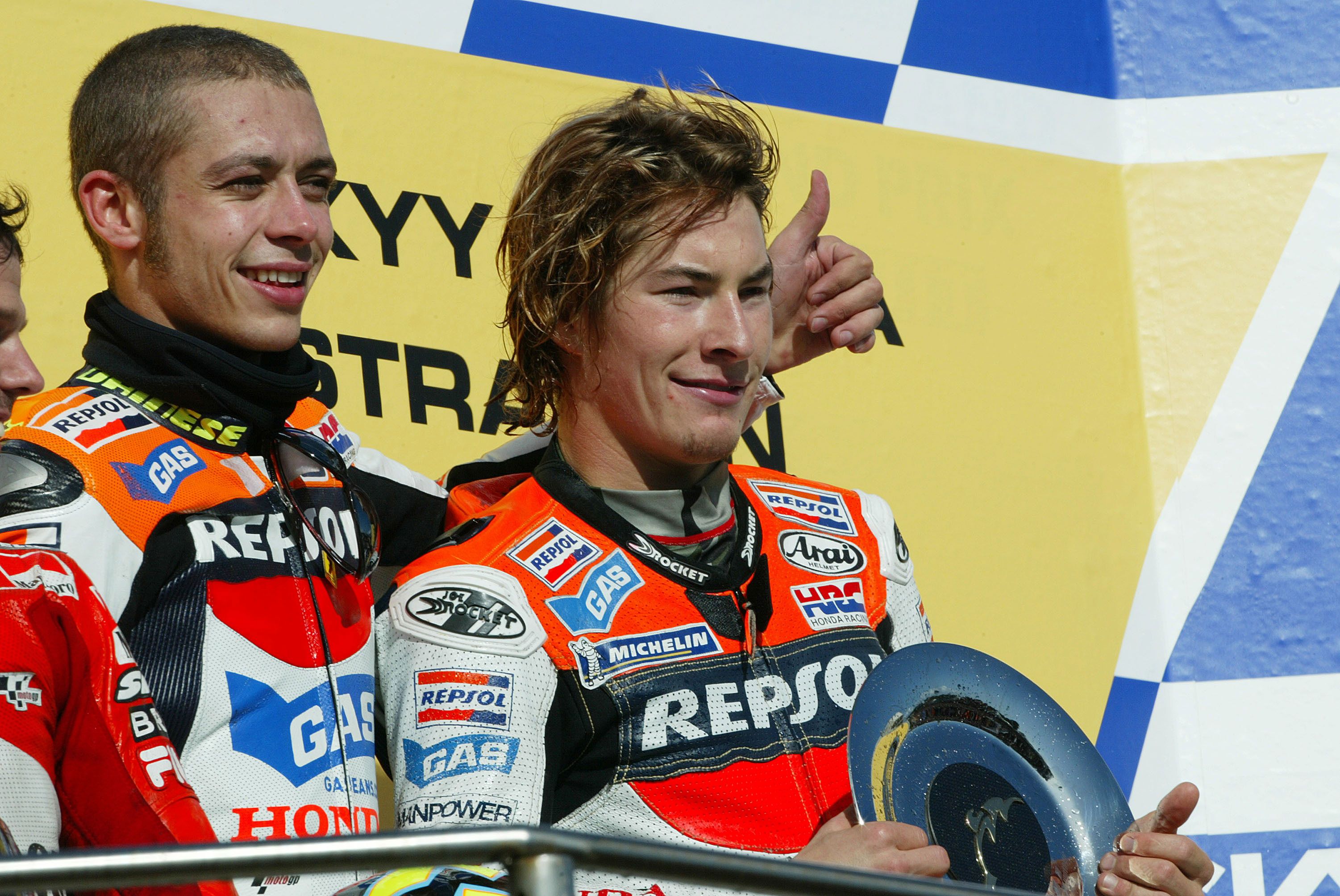
Valentino Rossi (pictured left) and Nicky Hayden on the podium at the 2003 Australian Grand Prix

Immediately after winning his AMA Superbike championship, Hayden was tapped to join not only Honda's MotoGP racing efforts, but what was arguably the premier team in MotoGP racing: The Factory Repsol Honda team.

In his rookie year of MotoGP, Hayden would be overshadowed by his teammate Valentino Rossi, who was the defending series champion of the year, but would still score consistent points. At the opening round in Japan, Hayden finished seventh while Rossi won the race. But the race was marred by the death of Japanese rider Daijiro Kato who crashed at the 130R and hit the barrier at high speed in the ensuing Casio Triangle. At the next race in South Africa, Hayden would once more finish in seventh position while his teammate scored second place.

Hayden's only retirement of the season came in Spain. He would score two 12th places at the next rounds in France and Italy and would finish ninth in Catalunya. Further points would arrive at the Dutch round with an 11th place, the British round with an eighth place, the German round with a then career-best fifth place, nearly losing out on fourth after a battle with Loris Capirossi, the Czech round with a fifth place, the Portuguese round with a ninth place and the Rio de Janeiro round with another fifth position.

At the Pacific GP, Hayden would score his first ever podium in the motoGP class after an overtaking manoeuvre from Makoto Tamada on the last lap, which pushed Sete Gibernau into the gravel, was deemed to be against the rules by Race Direction and disqualified Tamada from the race, gifting third place to Hayden. Hayden finished fourth in Malaysia, before scoring his second third place podium at the penultimate round in Australia. During the race, Hayden had made his way up to third but ran slightly wide at the Honda curve, dropping him behind Marco Melandri, Tohru Ukawa, Sete Gibernau and Carlos Checa. He fought his way back and finished +0.031 seconds ahead of Gibernau. Hayden also battled with teammate Rossi on the opening laps for fifth, passing and re-passing each other on multiple occasions. At the Valencian Community race, Hayden would finish just outside the points in 16th place.

Hayden finished fifth in his first year in the championship with 130 points, 227 points behind the champion and teammate Valentino Rossi, an achievement that won him the Rookie-of-the-Year award.

===== 2004 =====
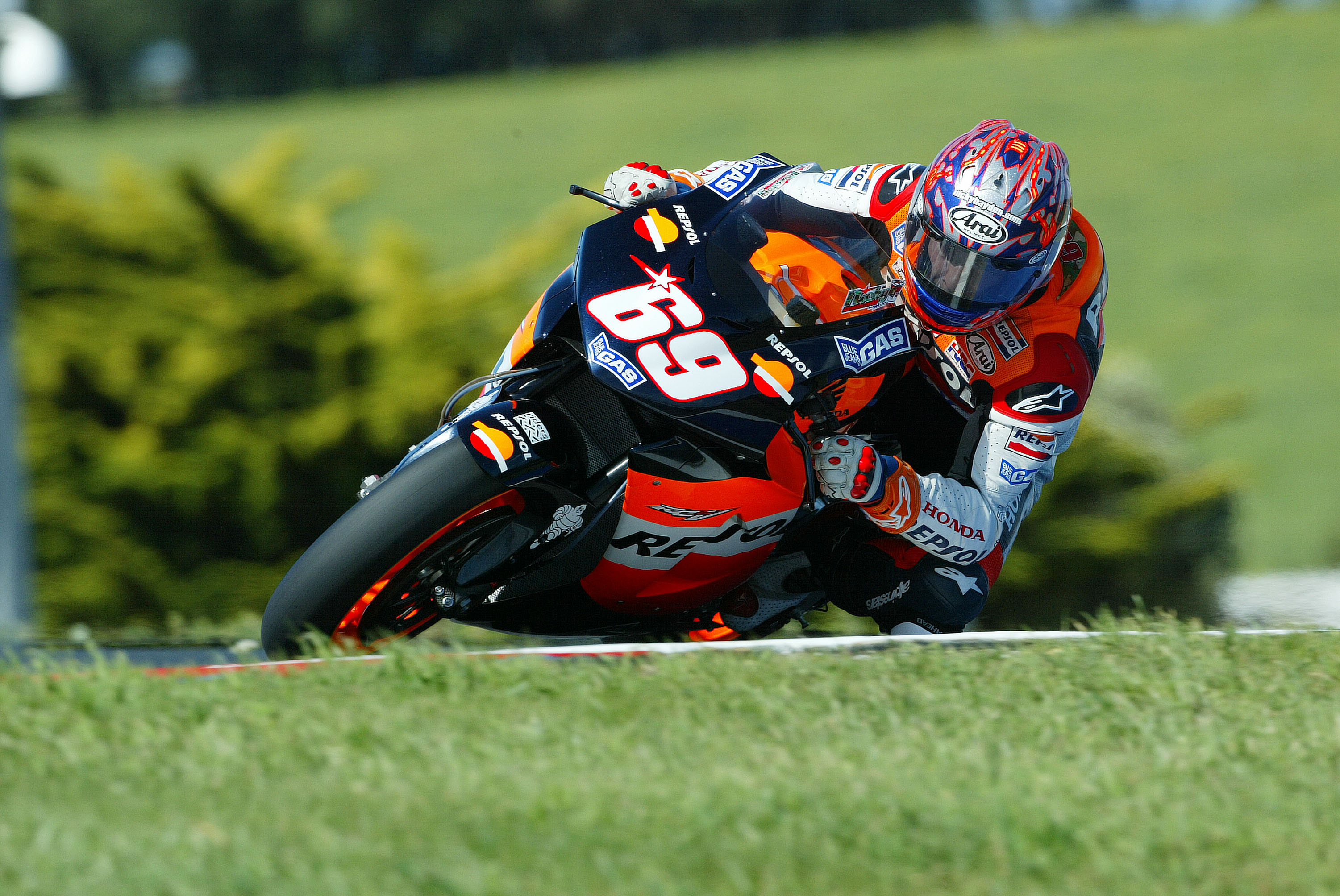
Hayden at the 2004 Australian Grand Prix

After his decent rookie year in the top class, many expected Hayden to do even better and some even speculated about a title fight with his new teammate Alex Barros or Valentino Rossi.

At the season opener in South Africa, Hayden started off well by scoring fifth, a result he would equal at the next round in Spain. In France however, he finished 11th before retiring at the first part of the rain-affected race in Italy. Hayden had qualified second on Saturday, 0.369 behind polesitter Sete Gibernau and 0.373 seconds quicker than third position Valentino Rossi to secure his second ever front row start on the grid. Hayden would retire once more in Catalunya, this time due to mechanical problems to his Factory Honda bike. At the Dutch round, Hayden would once more finish in fifth place.

At the seventh round of the season—the Rio de Janeiro GP—Hayden would score his first podium of the season in the form of a third place. At the start, both Max Biaggi and Hayden put pressure on Kenny Roberts Jr. who started from pole before passing him. At the halfway point, Hayden was in second place before being overtaken by the Honda Pons of Makoto Tamada and was relegated to third, a place he would maintain until the finish line. At the next race in Germany, Hayden would finish third once more, behind his teammate Barros and race winner Biaggi. On Saturday, Hayden qualified ninth, but managed to charge up the field and close in on Biaggi and Rossi halfway into the race, along with Barros. He would overtake Hayden for third place before he also passed Rossi for second. With six laps to go, Hayden overtook Rossi for the final podium position and would hold on to cross the line 0.207 seconds ahead of "The Doctor".

After his consistent podium finishes in the last two Grand Prix, Hayden would finish off the podium once more in fourth at the British GP. At the Czech Republic, Hayden would retire for the third time this season. On Saturday, he had qualified on the third row in seventh place, but showed some serious pace during the pre-race warm-up session by finishing first. When the lights went out, Hayden initially started off well—he moved up the field to battle with a three-man group consisting of Rossi, Biaggi and Barros, who tried to reduce the gap to race leader Gibernau. After Barros fell and retired, Hayden moved up to fourth, but with five laps to go, Hayden lost the front wheel on turn-in and bounced into the gravel, retiring from the race in the process.

Hayden would break his right collarbone when he rode a CRF450 Honda dirt bike in Italy, causing him to miss the next race in Portugal. He would return the next round in Japan but would retire from the race after he was involved in a six-bike crash on the opening lap, marking his fourth retirement of the season.

At the next three rounds in Qatar, Malaysia and Australia, Hayden would finish fifth, fourth and sixth, respectively, before retiring for the fifth and final time of the year at the last round at the Valencian Community. Hayden battled with Rossi and Biaggi during the race until his bike got sideways under braking into turn one, forcing him to ride wide (after narrowly avoiding hitting the back of Biaggi's machine)—handing Troy Bayliss third and Tamada fourth in the process. One lap later, he lost the front of his RCV heading onto the back straight and span out into retirement, much to the dismay of the watching Michael Jordan.

Hayden finished eighth in the championship with 117 points, 187 points behind the champion Valentino Rossi. He scored two podiums and retired five times—the most times he retired in one season in his career.

===== 2005 =====
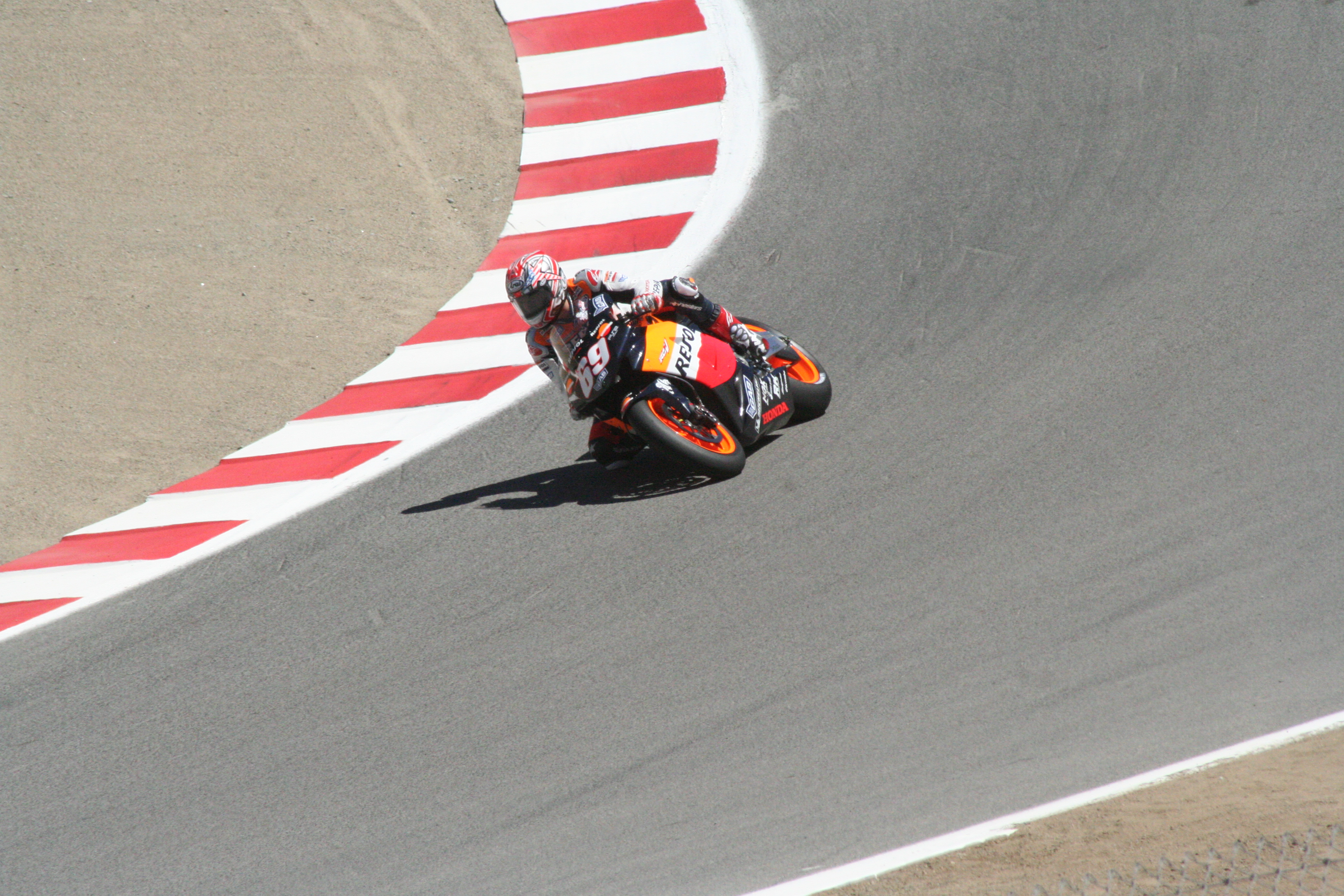
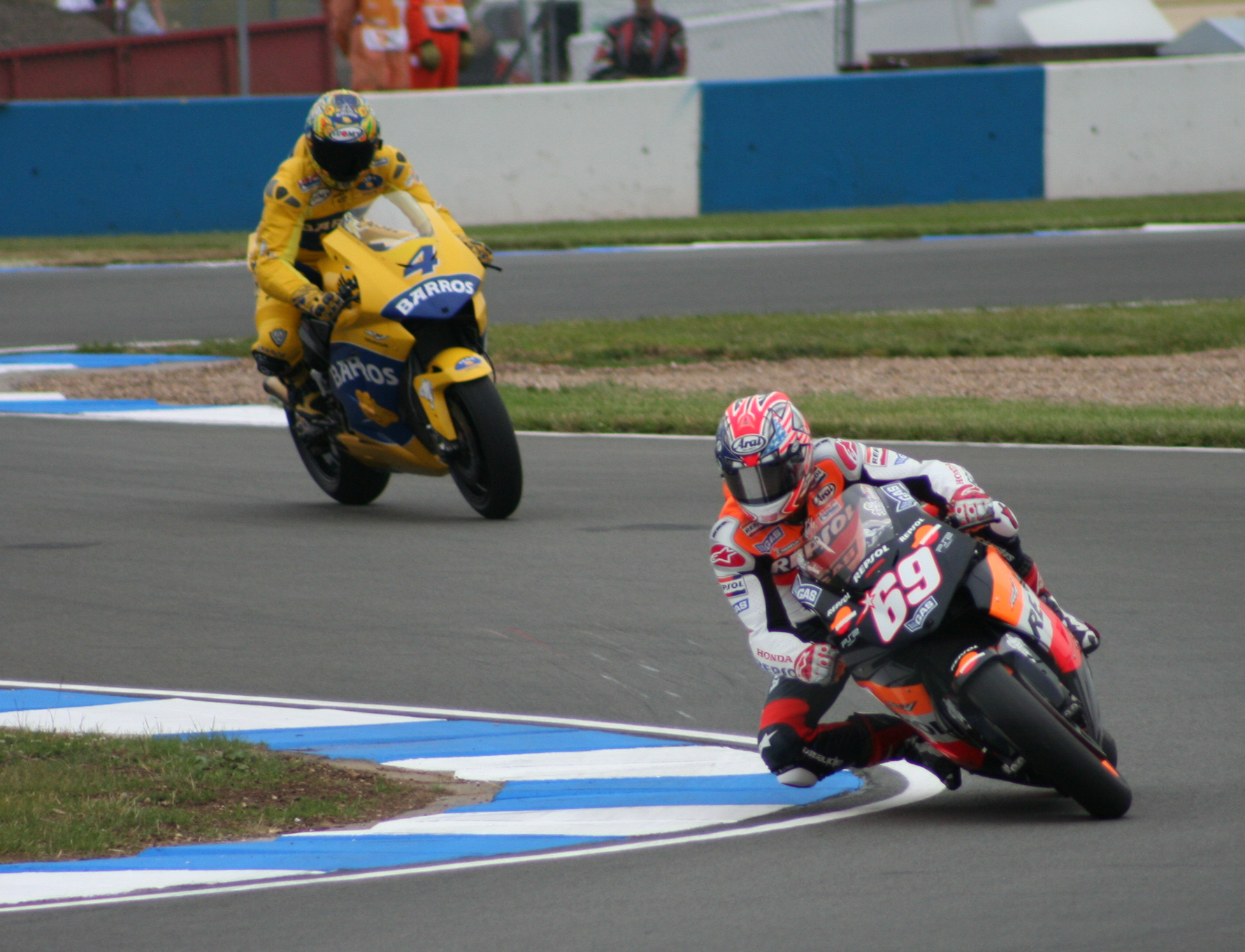
Hayden at the 2005 United States Grand Prix—his home race—and Hayden and Alex Barros at the 2005 British Grand Prix

After a relatively poor season in 2004, many people critiqued Hayden's performances and stated that he should be kicked out of the Factory Honda team. However, things would improve for him in 2005.

At the first round of the season in Spain, Hayden retired for the first time this season. Hayden was in a strong position to finish third—overtaking Valentino Rossi's Yamaha in the early part of the race before being demoted to third by the same Rossi—maintaining a two-second gap to fourth place Marco Melandri. With eight laps to go and 1.5 seconds behind the front runners Sete Gibernau and Rossi, Hayden lost the front of his factory RCV as he tipped in to final corner, sending him into the gravel trap and retirement. In contrast, Hayden scored consistent points in the next six races—the Portuguese, Chinese, French, Italian and Catalan and Dutch rounds—finishing seventh, ninth, sixth twice, fifth and fourth, respectively.

Hayden's breakthrough came at the United States GP, held at the Laguna Seca Raceway. The Californian venue had not been on the calendar since 1994, meaning that only a handful of riders had experience with this track. Australian Troy Bayliss and American Colin Edwards knew this track well from their Superbike days, as well as Hayden, who won an AMA race at the circuit in 2000 and taken fourth in a World Superbike wildcard outing in 2002. Rossi on the other hand, had never raced here, giving these riders an advantage. On Saturday, Hayden took his first ever pole position in the MotoGP class, beating former teammate Rossi by 0.354 seconds. On race day, Bayliss would be battling him for the first spot when the lights went out, but held on and built a gap of a second by the end of the opening lap. Rossi passed Bayliss for second place but 2.6 seconds separating Hayden and Rossi by lap 10. On lap 16, Edwards overtook Rossi for second place and cut the lead gap to 1.8 seconds three laps later. Hayden responded by upping his pace and crossed the line 1.941 seconds clear of second-place Colin Edwards and 2.312 seconds clear of third place Valentino Rossi. This was the first personal victory for the "Kentucky Kid" and the first win for the Factory Honda team since Rossi's last win at the 2003 Valencian Community round.

After a great result at his home grand prix in the US, Hayden recorded his second DNF of the season in Great Britain. On lap two, Hayden high-sided his bike at the final turn while being in seventh place. At round 10 in Germany, Hayden scored his second pole position of the season, as well as overall, beating Sete Gibernau by 0.101 seconds on his 24th birthday. When the lights went out, Hayden converted his pole into a lead at the first turn, followed by Rossi, Barros and Gibernau. The race was stopped on lap six after a highside of John Hopskin's Suzuki caused him to lay on the track injured. After the race was restarted with the results from lap five taken, Hayden would once more start in first position, followed by Rossi and Barros. At the restart, Hayden once more kept the position, with Rossi, Gibernau, Barros and now Max Biaggi following him. On lap two, Rossi took the lead from Hayden before he was relegated to third by Gibernau, overtaking him at the end of the same lap. Gibernau ran wide on the last lap, but Hayden failed to capitalise on this mistake, crossing the line 0.885 seconds behind race winner Rossi to pick up his second podium place of the season.

In the next three races, Hayden would finish off the podium. At the Czech, Japanese and Malaysian rounds, Hayden finished fifth, seventh and fourth—picking up the fastest lap at the Sepang circuit.

Hayden finished the season on the podium in the next four consecutive races. In Qatar, Hayden would score another third place podium position. In Australia, Hayden went on to score his third pole of the season on Saturday and set a new record on the Phillip Island circuit with a time of 1:29.337, 0.731 seconds faster than Rossi's previous record on the venue. The next day, Hayden converted his pole into a turn-one lead when the red lights went out. On lap three, Rossi overtook Hayden going into turn one before then being passed by Marco Melandri. Hayden fought back, passing Melandri again on the runup to Lukey Heights and closing the gap to Rossi and battling hard with him from laps eight to 17. On lap 17, Hayden would retake the lead from Rossi, but he had slowed down the pace enough for the trio of Melandri, Gibernau and Checa to catch the two at the top. On lap 19, Rossi overtook Hayden before Melandri did the same by taking the position under braking at the Honda hairpin. The pair would swap positions multiple times before Hayden finally found a firm advantage over Melandri, but the combined effect of the squabble and Rossi's victory charge up front, meant that Hayden was now one second behind Rossi with five laps to go. Hayden did everything to close the gap, but Rossi managed to win the race with a 1.007 second lead over him. At the new Turkish GP, Hayden took another third place and at the Valencian Community round, he would narrowly lose out on the race win by 0.097 seconds to race winner Marco Melandri, battling hard on the last lap.

Hayden finished third in the championship with 206 points, 161 points behind the champion Valentino Rossi and 14 points behind runner-up Marco Melandri. He scored six podiums—one of which was a win.

===== 2006 =====
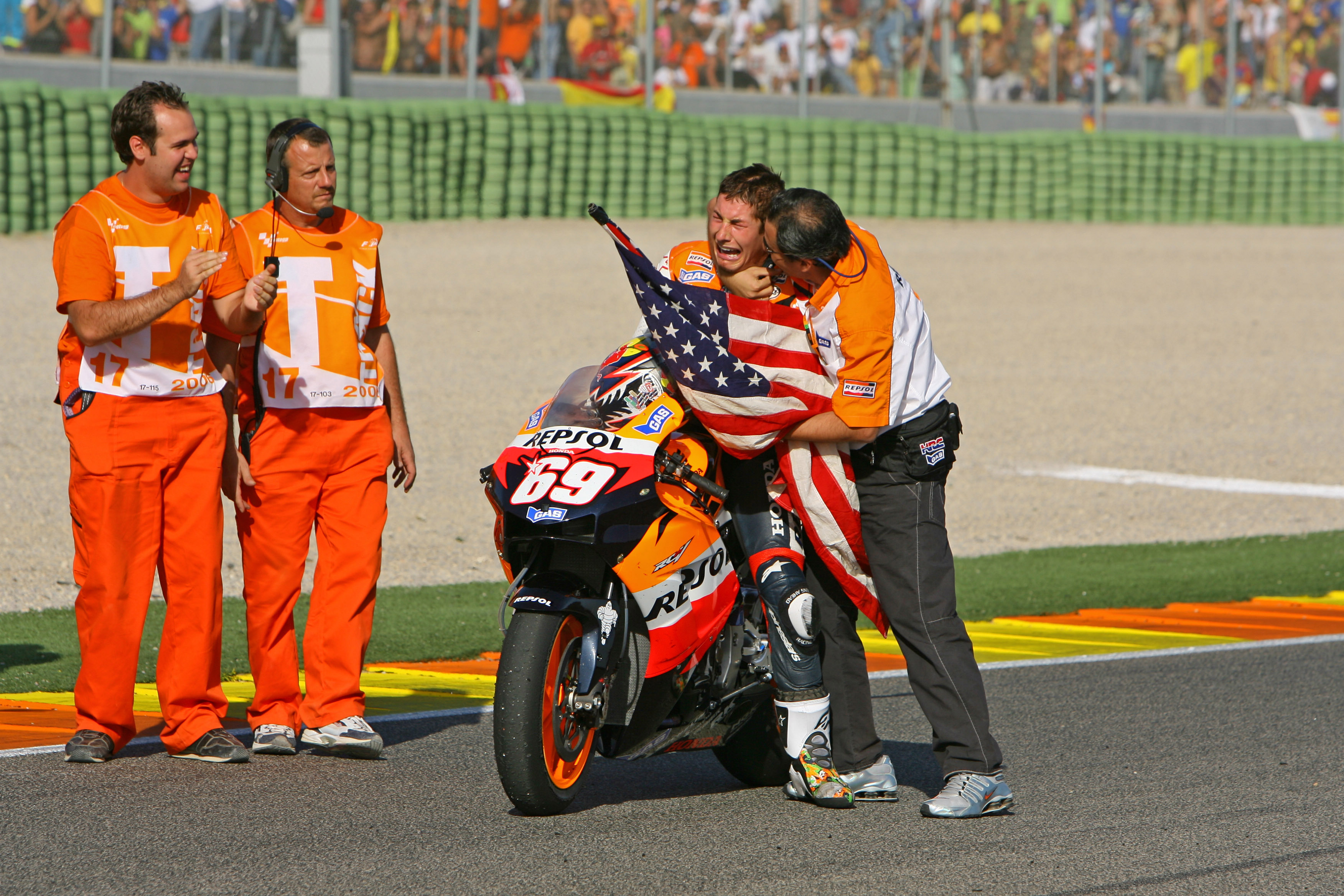
Nicky Hayden celebrating his world championship title at the 2006 Valencian Community Grand Prix

After silencing his critics in 2005 by winning his home race and scoring a multitude of podiums, 2006 would be an even better year for the "Kentucky Kid".

At the opening round in Spain, Hayden finished third, holding off Toni Elías by less than 0.1 seconds while title defender Valentino Rossi finished 14th after he was crashed out by the same Elías. At the second race in Qatar, Hayden finished in second place with Rossi winning the race. Hayden was running a strong race, even passing Rossi for the lead on lap 19, but ultimately lost out to him on the last lap and crossed the line 0.900 seconds behind Rossi. In Turkey, Hayden would finish third once more after his Factory Honda teammate Dani Pedrosa crashed out of contention at the final stages of the race. This allowed Hayden to take the championship lead from Capirossi by just one point. At the Chinese round, Hayden would record his fourth consecutive podium by finishing second behind his rookie teammate Pedrosa, who won the race. Hayden started fifth but dropped to seventh on the opening lap before moving up the field and finding himself second, behind Pedrosa. In the last 10 laps, Hayden closed the gap to Pedrosa to just 0.6 seconds with four laps to go, but he responded by upping his pace, setting a fastest lap and increasing the gap to win his first ever race with a margin of 1.505 seconds over Hayden.

At the French GP, Hayden finished off the podium for the first time this season by finishing fifth, but would still leave Le Mans with a 43-point advantage over Rossi in the championship because he finished even lower in eighth. His closest contenders at that time were Marco Melandri and Loris Capirossi, who were both three points behind at that point. After France, Hayden bounced back by finishing third in Italy, battling throughout the race and almost taking second from Capirossi (which also caused Capirossi to take the lead in the championship), second in Catalunya (while both Capirossi and Melandri missed the race), scoring the fastest lap, and scoring his first victory of the season at the Dutch round. Hayden started from fifth on the grid but overtook Marco Melandri, Shinya Nakano and pole-sitter John Hopkins to move up to second and chase down Colin Edwards, who had been leading the race for much of the race. On the penultimate lap, Hayden overtook him under braking for the back chicane. Edwards tried to keep his Factory Yamaha alongside him but was forced to lift and go down an escape road—rejoining just over a second from the Factory Honda rider. That mistake looked likely to settle the race, but Edwards pushed hard and passed Hayden again with just half a lap to go. Both were riding on the limit, but Edwards got a better drive heading into the fast kinks that precede the final chicane and retook the lead with just a few corners to go. Edwards then ran his M1 wide through the fast left hander, giving him a defensive inside line for the final chicane. Hayden lunged his machine and both went through the corner side-by-side, but Hayden couldn't make the corner (possibly after selecting neutral) and ran wide across the gravel. This would have given the victory to Edwards, but he also ran wide onto a slick patch of synthetic grass and was thrown off his bike, allowing Hayden to win the race. This win gave Hayden a full set of 25 points and with Rossi finishing in eighth place, he increased his gap over him by 46 points in the championship.

Hayden would once more finish off the podium in seventh place in Great Britain with Rossi picking up second place, but Hayden would respond in Germany by finishing third behind Marco Melandri and Rossi whom he battled with all throughout the race, finishing 0.266 behind eventual race winner Rossi, and by winning his home race at the United States round in Laguna Seca for the second consecutive year in a row. Hayden started sixth on the grid, but gained three places at turn one and was chasing down Kenny Roberts Jr. and pole-sitter Chris Vermeulen. Hayden overtook Kenny Roberts Jr. on lap nine, but by that time Vermeulen had built up a two-second gap. However, Hayden cut the gap to Vermeulen down as Vermeulen's Bridgestone tires started to suffer in the warm conditions and—as the halfway stage arrived—was within striking distance. Vermeulen ran slightly wide on the next lap, reluctantly conceding the win to Hayden. After taking over first place from Vermeulen, he built up a two-second gap and crossed the line first, 3.186 seconds ahead of Hayden's teammate Dani Pedrosa. Rossi retired from the race due to mechanical problems, increasing Hayden's championship lead over now second-place Pedrosa by 34 points and Rossi by 51 points, who now stood fourth in the championship.

Hayden finished ninth at the Czech Republic, fourth at the Malaysian, fifth at the Australian, despite scoring his first and only pole position of the season here, and finishing fifth once more in Japan. With Rossi scoring consistent podiums—including one win at Sepang—he managed to move up to second in the championship once more and cut the points deficit from 51 at Laguna Seca to 12 in Motegi.

At the penultimate round in Portugal, Rossi took pole position on Saturday with Hayden starting in third position. On race day, Hayden was taken out by his teammate Dani Pedrosa on the fifth lap after Pedrosa tried to overtake him but failed, lost the front and hit Hayden, causing both riders to retire. This first and only retirement of the year would hand Rossi the championship by eight points going into the last round of the season. However, because Rossi finished second—just 0.002 behind race winner Toni Elías—he took away five points from Rossi, which would play a crucial role at the last race in Valencia. After the race, Hayden said that he "didn't expect Dani to pull over and let me by, but I definitely didn't expect him to do that."

Being relegated to second in the championship standings, Hayden knew it would be tough to win at the Valencian Community round. Rossi needed to finish in second place or higher to win the title. He took his second consecutive pole position on Saturday with Hayden starting on the second row in fifth place. On race day however, Rossi got a poor start, dropping him back in seventh place on the opening lap. Hayden meanwhile moved up from sixth to second on lap three of 30. He then tried to go after race leader and wildcard rider Troy Bayliss, who replaced the injured Sete Gibernau. On lap five however, Rossi made a crucial mistake when he lost the front wheel of his M1 and slid out of contention. He managed to get going again, but it would be to no avail: Rossi finished 13th while Hayden crossed the line in third place behind the Ducatis of Bayliss and Capirossi, collecting 247 points to Hayden's 252 and in turn, Nicky Hayden won the 2006 title by five points.

===== 2007 =====
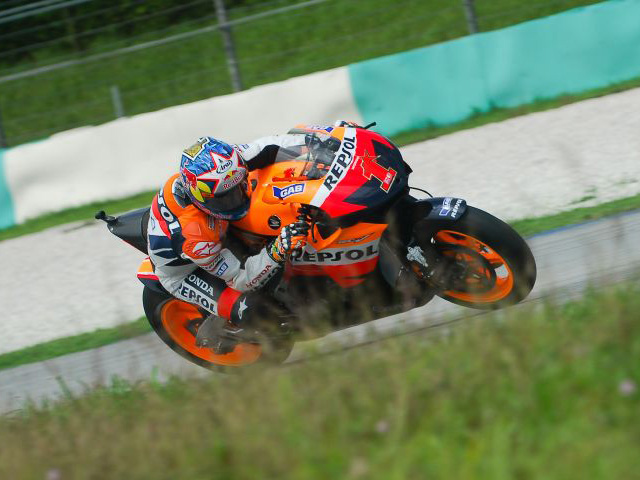
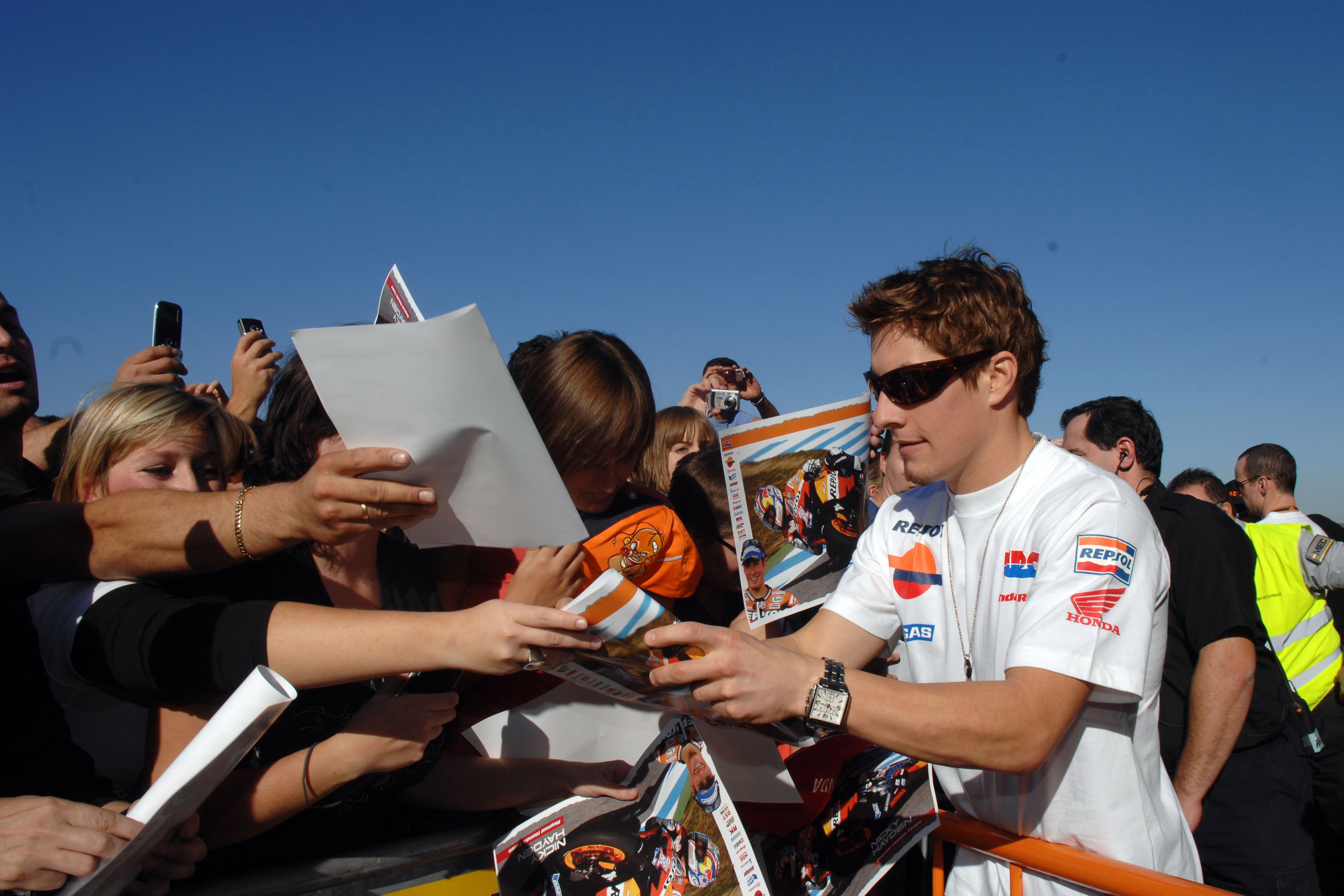
Hayden at the pre-season test sessions in Sepang, Malaysia and signing autographs before the start of the 2007 Valencian Community Grand Prix

On September 22, 2006, Hayden signed a two-year agreement that allowed for him to race for and develop with the factory Honda Racing Corporation (HRC) team for the 2007 and 2008 MotoGP seasons. He utilized the 800cc Honda RC212V, and as title holders, his MotoGP racing number changed from 69 to 1 for the 2007 season.

The 2007 season started badly for Hayden, struggling with the performance of the new bike. In Qatar he finished seventh while his teammate Dani Pedrosa finished on the podium, behind Valentino Rossi and Casey Stoner, who won for his debut race for Ducati. At the next two races in Spain and Turkey, Hayden finished in seventh place twice before finishing 12th in China.

At the French round, Hayden recorded his first retirement of the season. While running fourth in the race, he suffered a heavy fall with just four laps to go. Chris Vermeulen on the Suzuki won the rain-affected race. At the Italian and Catalan rounds, Hayden finished 10th and 11th before finishing outside of the points in 17th in Great Britain after crashing out of sixth place early on.

Things would get better at the Dutch round. On Thursday, he had a good pace on both free practice sessions, finishing third in both sessions. At the third free practice session on Saturday, he finished third once more. However, a wet qualifying meant that Hayden lost a lot of the momentum he had in the dry and qualified in 13th place. During warm-up on Sunday, the track was dry and Hayden finished the session first, ahead of the Suzuki of John Hopkins and the Yamaha of Valentino Rossi. When the race started, Hayden moved from 13th to sixth going into the first corner, and moved up to finish in third: his first podium of the season and his highest position since the start of the season. His good form continued at the next race in Germany. Starting just 14th on the grid after another poor qualifying performance, the Michelin-shod Honda of Hayden, as well as the Yamaha of Colin Edwards fared much better on the Sachsenring track compared to the Bridgestone-shod Ducati of Casey Stoner, whom they would overtake in the closing stages of the race. Hayden finished third, making this his second consecutive podium of the year.

After winning his home grand prix for two consecutive years, Hayden would retire for the second time at the United States round. After qualifying fourth on Saturday, he ran wide when he ran wide alongside John Hopkins at turn two and then made contact with Hopkins' Suzuki as both attempted to get back on line. Hayden would rejoin in 16th position, his Honda damaged, fighting with wildcards Chaz Davies and Miguel Duhamel. On lap eight, he was lapping around three seconds slower than the rest of the field and ahead of only Hopkins on the timing screens, prompting him to retire eventually. Before the race, an authorized biography on Hayden and his brothers--The Haydens: Nicky, Tommy, & Roger, from OWB to MotoGP—timed to coincide with his return to the US Grand Prix. He bounced back at the next race in the Czech Republic, scoring another third place podium. On Saturday, Hayden qualified 0.280 seconds behind Casey Stoner in second place, but slipped to fourth after a poor getaway at the line. He would eventually pass his teammate Pedrosa to hold on to third place on lap two, a position he held for the rest of the race.

At the new race in San Marino, Hayden finished 13th after a poor start and a crash—involving Randy de Puniet and Pedrosa—forced him into the gravel. At the Portuguese round, Hayden scored his first and only pole position of the season on Saturday, outqualifying Casey Stoner by just 0.040 seconds. However, he would struggle on race day, managing to finish just off the podium in fourth after moving up the order after an early race slump. In Japan, Hayden finished in ninth place.

In Australia, Hayden retired for the third time of the season. Hayden started off well, moving up from fourth to second on the opening lap and battling with Stoner at the first half of the race. On lap 11 however, his engine started to lose power, which allowed Rossi to move up to second place. On lap 13, he lost power completely, forcing him to retire. At the last two races of the season—the Malaysian and Valencian Community rounds—Hayden finished ninth and eighth.

Hayden finished eighth in the championship with 127 points, 240 points behind the champion Casey Stoner and 115 points behind runner-up and Factory Honda teammate Dani Pedrosa.

In 2008, Hayden ran his old number 69 since Casey Stoner earned the right to run the number 1 plate after winning the MotoGP title in 2007.

===== 2008 =====
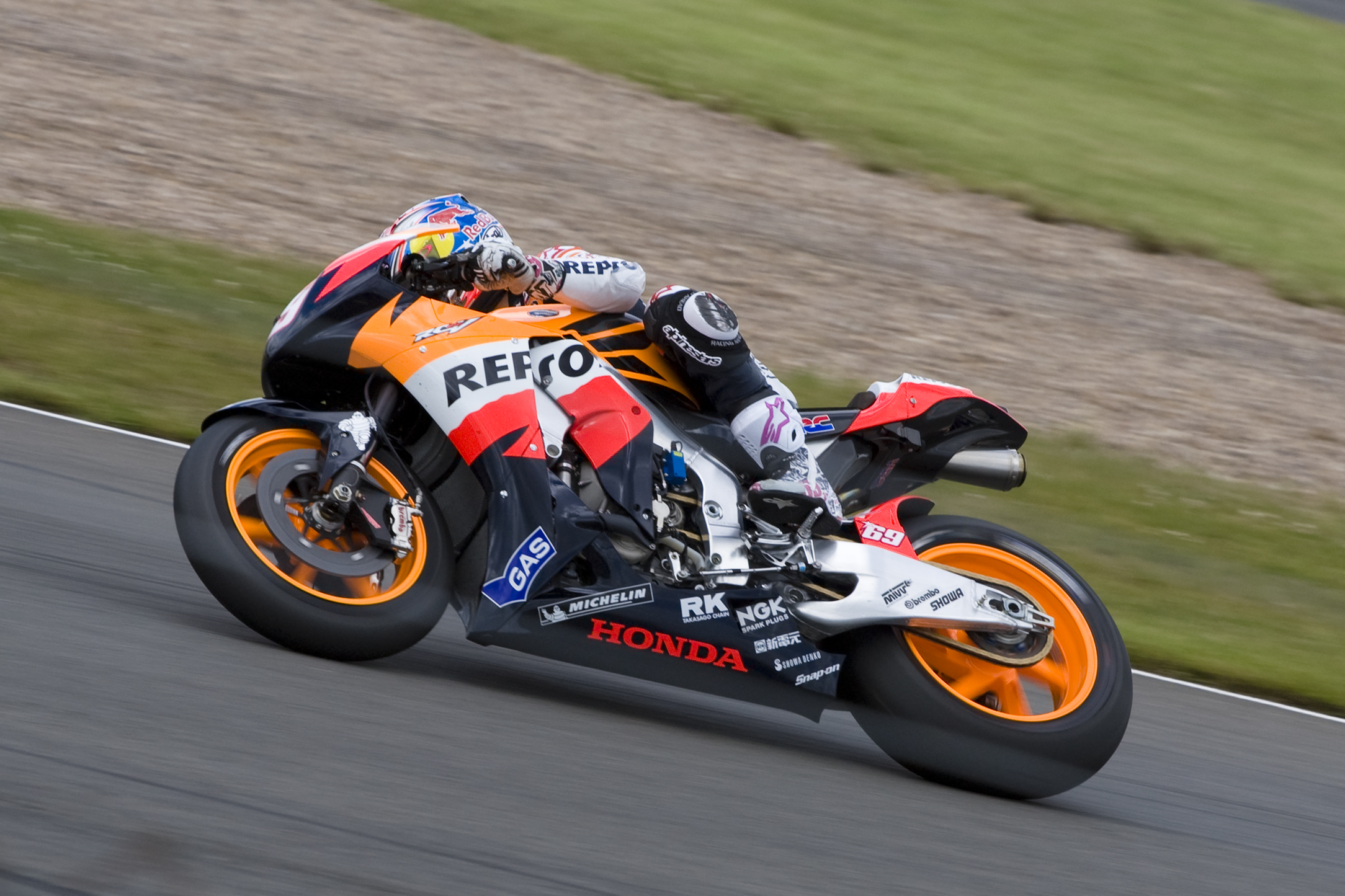
Hayden at the 2008 British Grand Prix

Hayden finished tenth at the opening race in Qatar and was duly outpaced by his teammate Dani Pedrosa, who finished on the podium in third place. At the next race in Spain, Hayden finished just off the podium in fourth position while his teammate went on to win the race. During the race, he was close to overtaking Jorge Lorenzo, but a mistake with just six laps to go allowed the Spaniard to finish third.

Hayden would register his first and only retirement of the season in Portugal. He had dropped back to seventh on the opening lap, before he fought his way back up to fifth place. A crash by Andrea Dovizioso allowed him to move up into fourth position and he was trying to close down a two-second gap to third place Valentino Rossi, but he lost the front of his bike at turn seven and slid out of contention. In the following five rounds, Hayden would not finish higher than sixth. He finished sixth in China, eighth in France, 13th in Italy, eighth again in Catalunya and seventh in Great Britain. The race in Donington Park also marked the race debut of Honda's pneumatic-valve engine, which only Hayden was using initially.

At round nine—the Dutch round in Assen—Hayden ran third from the start and was set to finish there until he ran out of fuel at the final corner, due to an electrical system problem which prevented accurate fuel monitoring. Colin Edwards captured Hayden's third-place podium moments before Hayden coasted over the line with no power, to finish in fourth place. At the next two rounds in Germany and his home round at the United States, Hayden finished in 13th and fifth positions. A heel injury sustained in a motocross crash meant that Hayden would not participate in the Czech and San Marino rounds.

As the season went on, the relations within the team had already deteriorated, and there was further friction when Pedrosa switched tire suppliers midseason (from the struggling Michelin to the dominant Bridgestone) without Hayden being consulted. Hayden stated "I've never been put in the conditions to choose. Once they told me that I would have just wasted my time had I even only thought about asking for Bridgestone tires...I'm not surprised they've given them to him. Besides, at Misano I didn't even have the same fork Dani had... No way would I think they'd let me try the new tires". This incident lent weight to the rumours that Hayden and Honda would part ways for the next season. The rumour was confirmed on September 12, 2008, when Hayden stated during a Dorna press conference, "It's no secret. Everybody knows where my next stop is going to be...But officially we're waiting to do it the right way, until the releases come out, because there's teams and stuff".

Despite all the friction and negativity in the media between Hayden and the Repsol Honda team, he would go on to finish the season on a more positive note than last year. In his return race at the inaugural Indianapolis race, he would go on to finish second—his first podium of the season. Hayden started fourth but moved his way up the order, overtaking Valentino Rossi—who had fallen back from pole to fourth position at the start —, his future Ducati teammate Casey Stoner and rookie Andrea Dovizioso on the second lap to take over the lead. After Rossi fought his way back up to second, he would overtake Hayden under wet and tricky conditions down at the main straight on lap 14. With the rain increasing, Hayden started struggling and almost lost second place to the charging Jorge Lorenzo, until the marshalls red-flagged the race with seven laps to go. At the Japanese race, Hayden would finish in fifth position.

Hayden's second and last podium of the season, and of his Honda career, would come at the race in Australia. Hayden qualified third while home hero Stoner took pole position. When the lights went out, Stoner was challenged by the 'Kentucky Kid' for 10 laps, before the Australian started to pull a two-second advantage halfway through the race and a 6.5 second lead at the chequered flag. Hayden—still in second place at the time—was facing a late charging Valentino Rossi, who had worked his way up from 12th after a high-speed qualifying fall on Saturday. Hayden fought hard to keep second place, but ultimately couldn't prevent Rossi from taking it on the final lap. At the last two rounds of his Honda career in Malaysia and Valencia, Hayden finished fourth and fifth, respectively.

By the middle of 2008, it was strongly suspected by fans, media, and the MotoGP paddock already, and later supported by Hayden's own admission during a press conference that he would be leaving Honda, that Hayden would be joining the Ducati Marlboro Team to ride alongside Casey Stoner for the 2009 MotoGP season. This was confirmed on September 15, 2008 thus ending his 10-year relationship with Honda.

==== Ducati (2009–2013) ====
===== 2009 =====
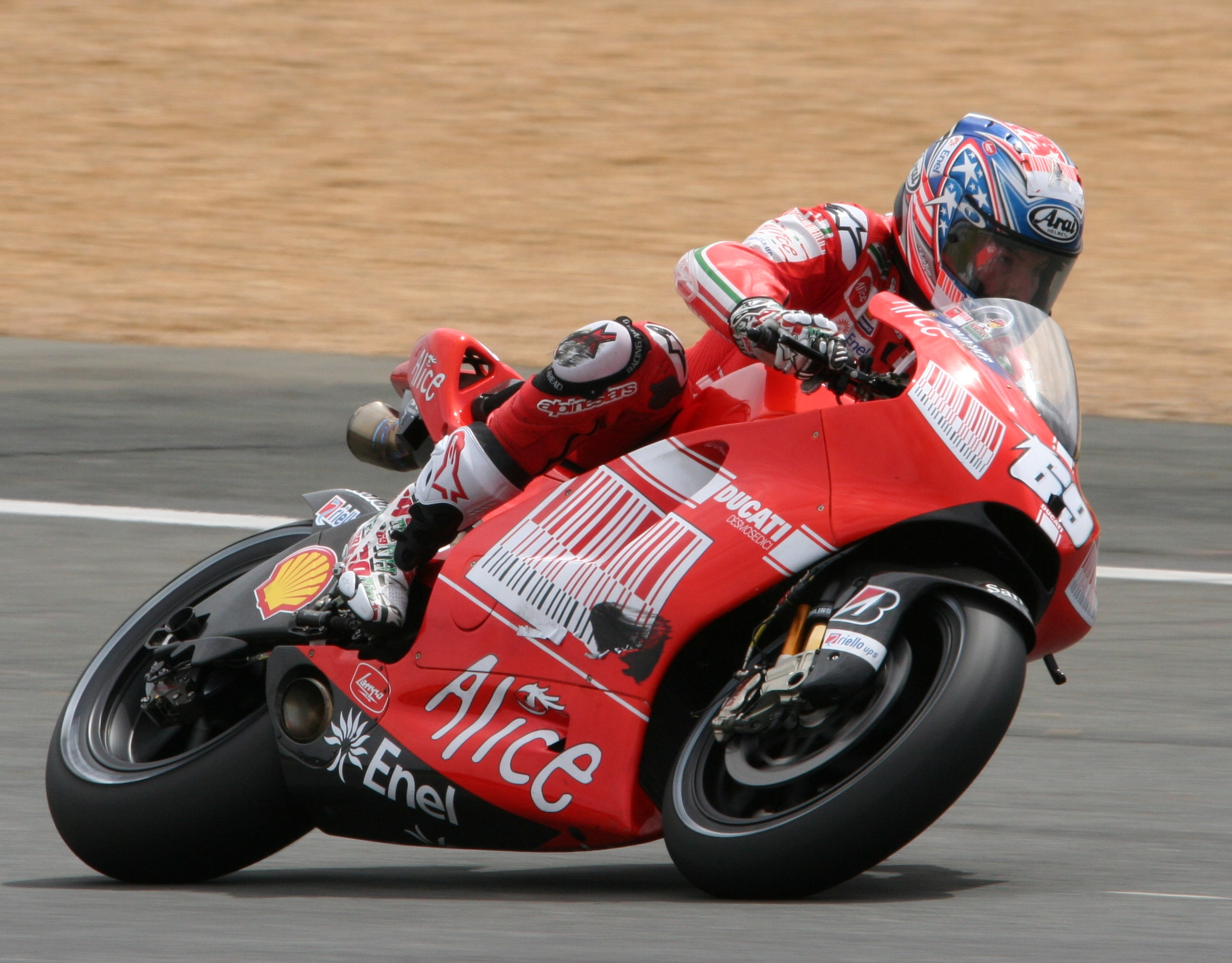
Hayden at the 2009 French Grand Prix

During preseason testing, Hayden was plagued with problems and routinely finished in the mid-pack or lower. His major complaint was that the GP09 was "pumping" during corner exits leading to problems with grip. These problems continued throughout preseason testing.

Hayden's first season at Ducati started off badly when, during qualifying at the season opener Qatar round, he suffered from a severe pain in his back and needed three stitches for a cut to his chest after he fell in a major crash. He was launched into the air by a highside at the end of the 45-minute qualifying session when he was trying to improve on his 16th position, and was taken to hospital afterward. After it was declared that Hayden had not broken any bones, he returned in the warm-up session on Sunday and went on to finish 12th in the rain-delayed race, just behind his former teammate Dani Pedrosa. This was also Hayden's 100th grand prix. Despite the setbacks, Hayden seemed optimistic about the results saying "I'm leaving here in a really positive mood and looking forward to Motegi.

At the second race in Japan, Hayden had never ridden the Ducati in the rain and qualified 12th. Then, on the opening lap of the race, Hayden was taken out by rookie Yuki Takahashi who plowed through Hayden from the rear under braking for the hairpin. As a result, Hayden retired from the race and slipped further down the standings.

After Motegi, Hayden would continuously underperform compared to teammate Casey Stoner. He would finish 15th in Spain, 12th in France and Italy but would slowly work his way up as the season progressed when he finished tenth in Catalunya, eighth in Netherlands and fifth at his home race in the United States, his best result of the season yet. He finished in eighth place at the German, 15th and a lap down after a poor tire choice at the British and sixth at the Czech rounds. By round 11 however, Stoner already had won two GPs and finished on the podium a further three times.

His breakthrough on the Ducati would come at the Indianapolis round. After qualifying sixth on Saturday, he would move up to fifth and then fourth when Dani Pedrosa and Valentino Rossi crashed out of the race. He then overtook fellow countryman Colin Edwards for third but had to hold off Repsol Honda rider Andrea Dovizioso in the closing stages of the race. He did so and would go on to finish half-a-second clear of Dovizioso, becoming the first Ducati rider other than Stoner to finish on the podium since Loris Capirossi did so at the 2007 Japanese Grand Prix.

After his first podium of the season, Hayden would register his second retirement when he got tangled up in an incident caused by Alex de Angelis and Colin Edwards. When de Angelis tried to gain positions during the short right-left turns one and two, he hit Edwards who then clipped the back of Hayden, making them all retire from the race on the opening lap of the San Marino GP. After Misano, Hayden finished eighth in Portugal, 15th in Australia after he crashed once more with Jorge Lorenzo on the opening lap and lost a significant amount of time in the process and fifth twice in Malaysia and Valencia.

Hayden finished 13th in the championship with 104 points, 202 points behind the champion Valentino Rossi and 157 points behind runner-up Jorge Lorenzo, his worst result since he first started racing in the MotoGP class in 2003.

===== 2010 =====
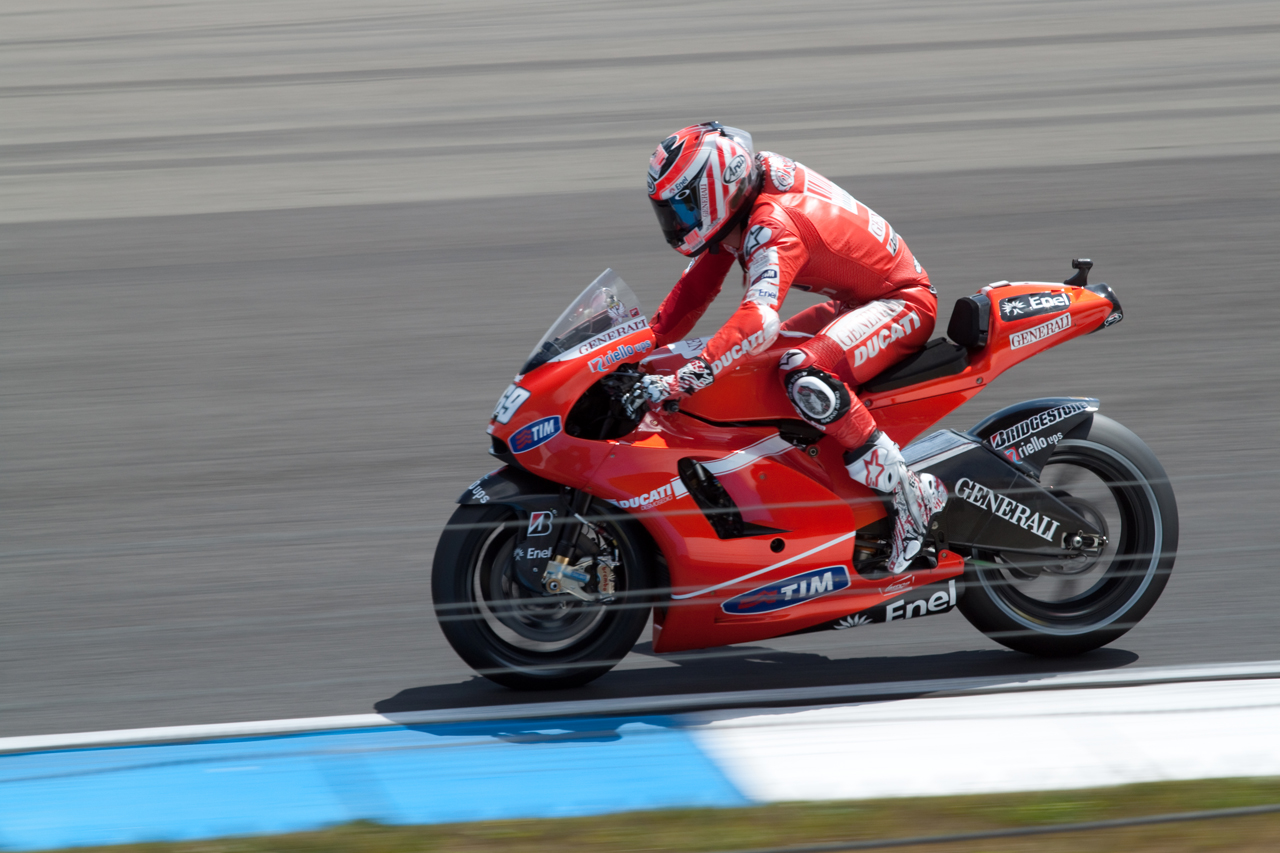
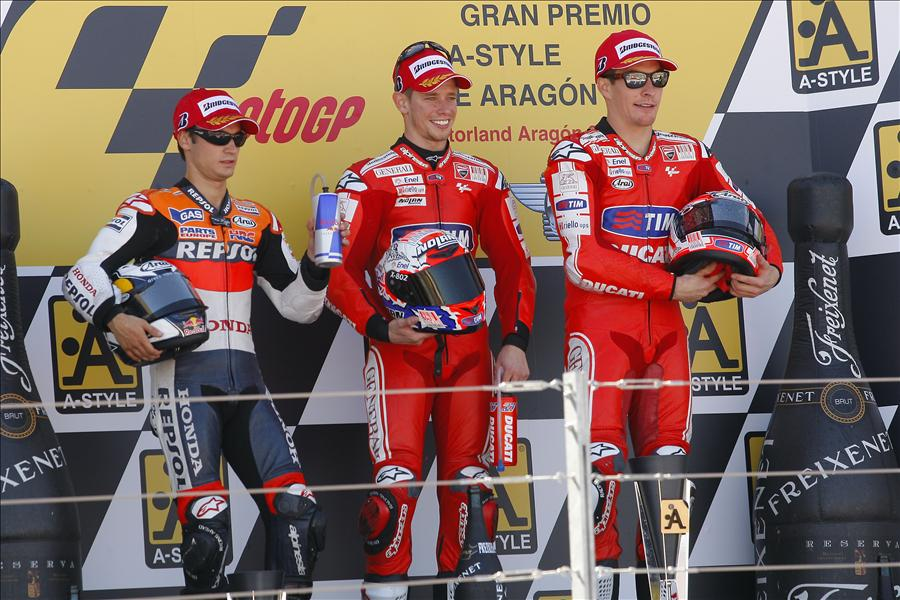
Hayden at the 2010 Dutch TT and standing on the podium after finishing in third place at the 2010 Aragón Grand Prix

On September 3, 2009, Ducati said that Hayden had signed a one-year extension of his contract for the 2010 MotoGP season, ending speculation of a move away from the team. He would partner with Casey Stoner once more at the team.

During the off-season, Hayden had surgery on his right arm, having been suffering from compartmental syndrome or more commonly known as arm-pump.

Hayden would, compared to previous years, start off the season well by finishing fourth three consecutive times at the Qatar, Spanish and French rounds. However, his string of good luck would end at the fourth round of the season in Italy when he slid out of sixth place on lap six. After his retirement in Mugello, Hayden would go on to finish fourth in Great Britain, seventh in the Netherlands, eighth in Catalunya, seventh in Germany, fifth in the United States and sixth twice in the Czech Republic and at Indianapolis.

At the San Marino race, Hayden retired once more when he fell on the opening lap and took out Loris Capirossi, damaging his right little finger and requiring surgery in the process. After his second crash of the year, Hayden registered his first podium in the form of third place at the Aragón GP. On the last lap, he overtook the Yamaha of Jorge Lorenzo on the penultimate corner by diving on the inside through the second part of the slow right-left turns 14 and 15 that leads onto the back straight. With Hayden putting his Ducati on the racing line, Lorenzo was forced to back off and that prevented him from retaking the place going into the long, sweeping turn 16, granting Hayden third place. With Casey Stoner winning the race, this marked the first time that two Ducatis finished on the podium since Stoner and Loris Capirossi finished first and second at the 2007 Australian Grand Prix.

Hayden spun off on lap two of the Japanese round, along with Ben Spies. Hayden got going again and finished in 12th position. At the Malaysian, Australian and Portuguese rounds, Hayden finished in sixth, fourth and fifth positions, respectively. At the final race in Valencia, Hayden would retire for the third time this season after he lost the front end of his machine and slid into the gravel trap from third place.

Hayden finished seventh in the championship with 163 points, 220 points behind the champion Jorge Lorenzo and 82 points behind runner-up Dani Pedrosa.

===== 2011 =====
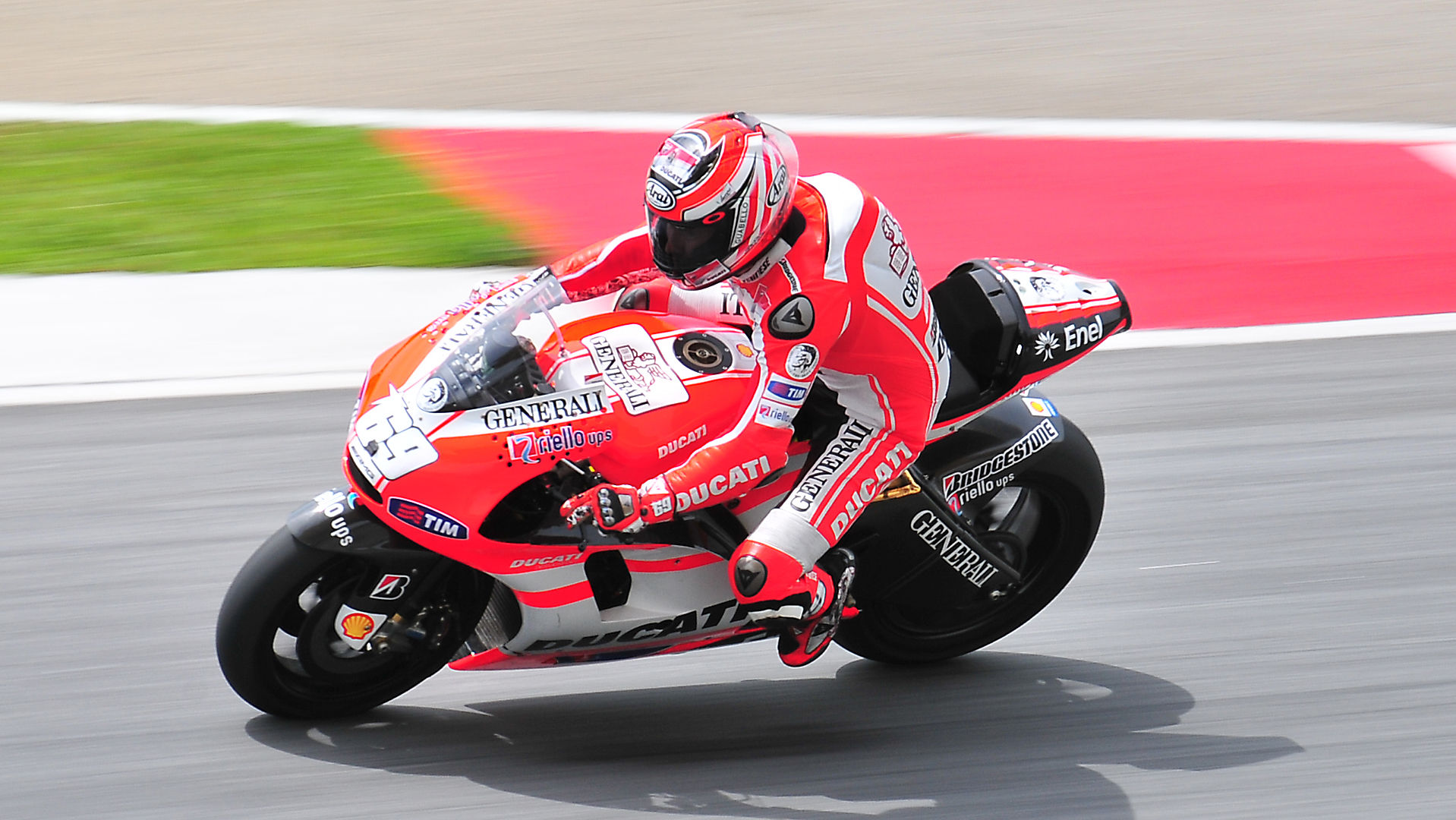
Hayden during pre-season testing at Sepang for the 2011 season

On August 28, 2010, Hayden extended his partnership with Ducati, signing a two-year contract extension with the factory team. He is joined in the team by his former Honda teammate Valentino Rossi, who also signed a two-year deal, to partner Hayden.

Hayden's 2011 season started with a ninth-place finish in Qatar, before he achieved a third place at the Spanish round. Having avoided other incidents that eliminated several front-runners from the race, Hayden was aided by a last-lap mechanical failure for Colin Edwards, which caused him to crash out of the race, to take his first podium since the 2010 Aragón race where he also finished in third position.

After his first and only podium of the season at round two, Hayden continued to stay in the points-scoring positions for the next ten races, including a fastest lap during the British GP. Hayden finished ninth in Portugal, seventh in France, eighth in Catalunya, fourth in Great Britain, fifth in the Netherlands, tenth in Italy, eighth in Germany, seventh twice in the United States and Czech Republic and 14th in Indianapolis. He took top-ten finishes in all but one race, when he finished 14th in his home race at Indianapolis. He finished the race two laps down after making an unscheduled pit stop—having run as high as fifth during the race—after losing grip on his softer-compound Bridgestone front tire, causing a higher amount of wear to the left-hand side of the tire itself.

At the San Marino round, Hayden registered his first retirement of the season. During the rain-affected race, Hayden lost the front on the exit of turn 15 and slid out of contention on lap three. After Misano, Hayden recorded three consecutive seventh-place finishes in Aragón, Japan and Australia to maintain his eighth place in the riders' championship. The Malaysian Grand Prix—in which Hayden had qualified sixth for—was cancelled after the death of Marco Simoncelli.

At the final race of the season—the Valencian Community round—Hayden retired once more when he was eliminated, along with teammate Rossi, in a four-bike first-corner collision on the opening lap which was caused by the Suzuki of Álvaro Bautista. The incident left Hayden with a broken wrist, and he was forced to miss post-season testing the following week.

Hayden finished eighth in the championship with 132 points, 218 points behind the champion Casey Stoner and 128 points behind runner-up Jorge Lorenzo.

===== 2012 =====
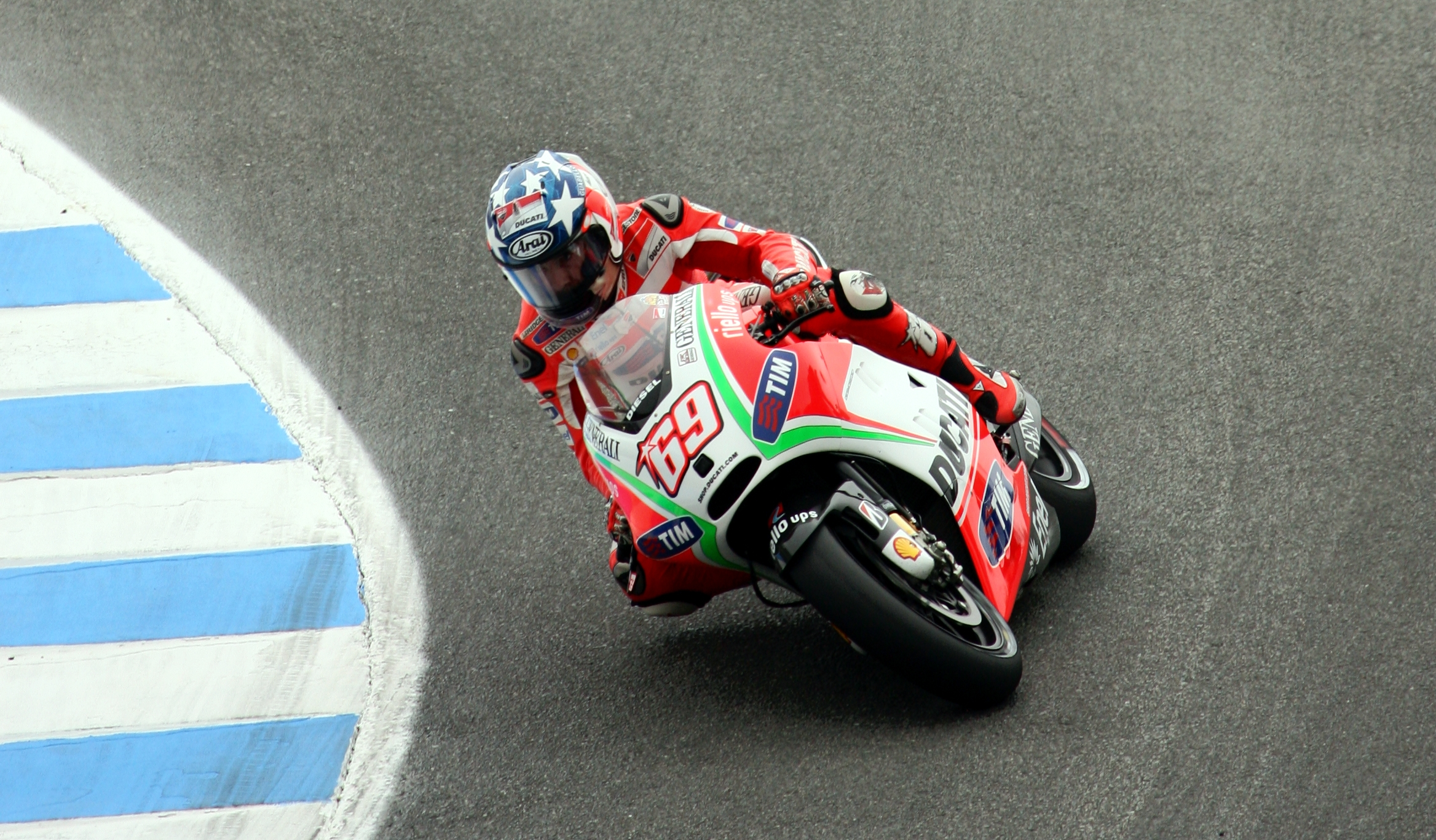
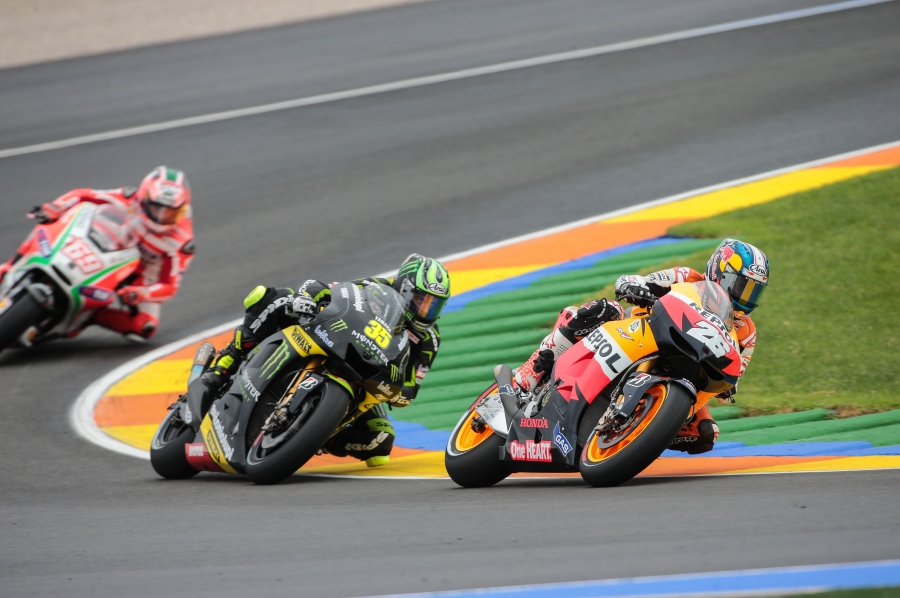
Hayden at the 2012 United States Grand Prix and along with Dani Pedrosa and Cal Crutchlow at the 2012 Valencian Community Grand Prix

Hayden remained with Ducati for the 2012 season. For the first ten races, he finished consistently in the points: sixth in Qatar, eighth in Spain, 11th in Portugal, sixth again in France, ninth in Catalunya, seventh in Great Britain, sixth once more in the Netherlands, tenth in Germany, seventh in Italy and sixth for the fourth time at his home race in the United States.

At the Indianapolis round, Hayden had been expecting the best performance to date for the Ducati team, believing it to be well-suited to the track conditions at the circuit. However, Hayden did not take part in the race after suffering an accident at turn 14 during the qualifying session, trying to improve on his qualifying time. As a result, Hayden suffered a concussion in the process, ruling him out of the race. A fractured right hand also ruled him out of the following race in the Czech Republic.

Although not fully recovered from his injuries, thanks to the support of the official physiotherapist Freddie Dente, Hayden returned for the San Marino GP, where he finished in seventh position.

Hayden failed to finish the Aragon Grand Prix, running wide at the final turn before crashing into a track-side wall at enough speed to launch him over the wall. He finished eighth in Japan and Australia, sandwiching a season's best fourth-place finish at the Malaysian Grand Prix. He crashed out of the final race in Valencia.

Hayden finished ninth in the championship with 122 points, 228 points behind the champion Jorge Lorenzo and 210 points behind runner-up Dani Pedrosa. This was the first time in his career that he did not get a podium finish during the season.

===== 2013 =====
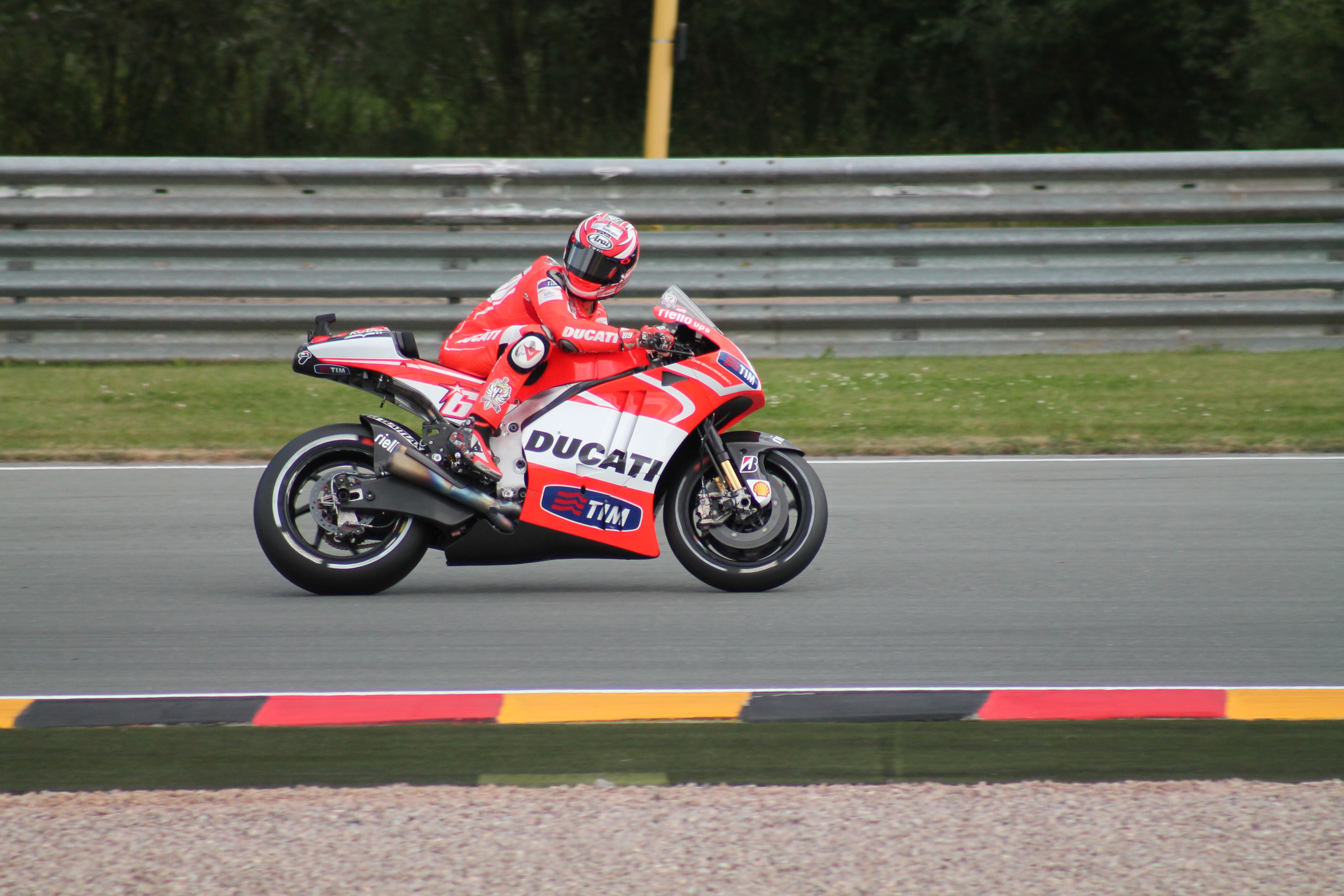
Hayden at the 2013 German Grand Prix

For the 2013 season, Hayden was joined in the factory Ducati team by Andrea Dovizioso, who moved from the Tech3 Yamaha squad to replace Valentino Rossi, who returned to the factory Yamaha setup. Hayden had stated that Dovizioso was the "best possible choice" to replace Rossi, prior to him signing a contract.

Hayden scored points in the first five races: eighth in Qatar, ninth at the Americas, seventh in Spain, a season-best fifth in France and sixth in Italy.

At round six in Catalunya, Hayden retired for the first time this season. Hayden initially had made up ground, where he went from fifth to eighth, to pass the Pramac Ducati of Andrea Iannone, but would crash out of the race on lap six when the front of his machine let go when he turned into the left-hander at turn 10 after passing Stefan Bradl for fifth place.

Hayden finished 11th in the Netherlands, ninth in Germany, eighth at his home race in the United States, ninth again in Indianapolis, eighth twice in the Czech Republic and Great Britain and ninth twice in San Marino and Aragón.

At the Malaysian GP, Hayden retired once more with mechanical problems. Having started in 11th place, he was forced to stop when his engine failed and blew up in a cloud of smoke at the end of lap eight. After his engine woes in Sepang, Hayden went on to finish the last three races of the season—the Australian, Japanese and Valencian Community rounds—in seventh, ninth and eighth places, respectively.

Hayden finished ninth in the championship with 126 points, 208 points behind the champion Marc Márquez and 204 points behind runner-up Jorge Lorenzo. For the second consecutive season, Hayden did not get a podium finish during the season.

==== Aspar Team (2014–2015) ====
===== 2014 =====
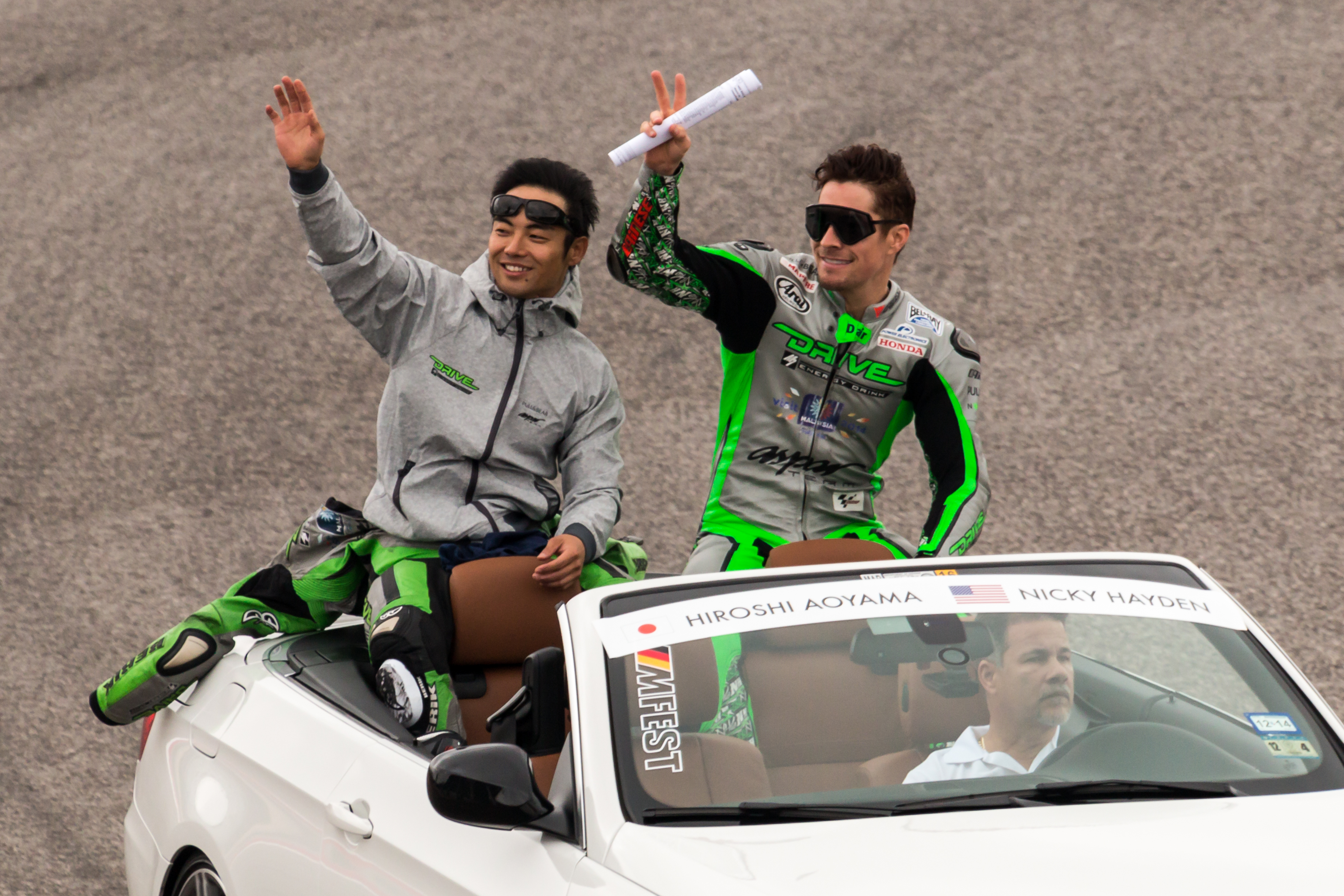
Hayden and Hiroshi Aoyama at the 2014 Grand Prix of the Americas

It was announced on October 17, 2013, that, after five years with Ducati, Hayden had signed with the Aspar Team for the 2014 season. Hayden partnered Hiroshi Aoyama, who moved from the Avintia Blusens squad, with the pair riding open-specification Honda RCV1000R motorcycles.

At the season opening round in Qatar, Hayden finished in the exact same position as where he finished last year, which is in eighth position. In the following three rounds—the Americas, Argentina and Spanish grands prix—he finished eleventh three consecutive times.

At round five of the season in France, Hayden retired for the first time of the season when he came into contact with the Pramac Ducati of Andrea Iannone at the exit of the first turn on the opening lap.

Hayden did not participate at the Italian race due to a wrist injury, which had lingered since the Spanish GP two races earlier. He expected to return for the next round in Catalunya if the surgery was successful.

After the surgery had been done without any major problems, Hayden returned in Catalunya where he finished 12th. At the Dutch round, Hayden finished outside of the points for the first time since the 2007 British GP but finished in the points again at the next round in Germany with a 14th place.

Hayden missed the Indianapolis, Czech, British and San Marino rounds due to a second round of surgery on his right wrist in July to remove a set of small bones. He returned in Aragón, where he finished ninth in wet-dry conditions which forced him to make a late-race bike swap. This was also his best race result since his opening race result in Losail earlier in the year. In the following two races in Japan and Australia, he finished in 14th and 10th positions, respectively.

At the penultimate round in Malaysia, Hayden registered his second retirement of the year. He crashed out of a top-ten finish at the hairpin. At the last race of the season—the Valencian Community GP—Hayden finished in 13th place.

Hayden finished 16th in the championship with 47 points, 315 points behind the champion Marc Márquez and 248 points behind runner-up Valentino Rossi. For the third consecutive season, Hayden did not get a podium finish during the season.

===== 2015 =====
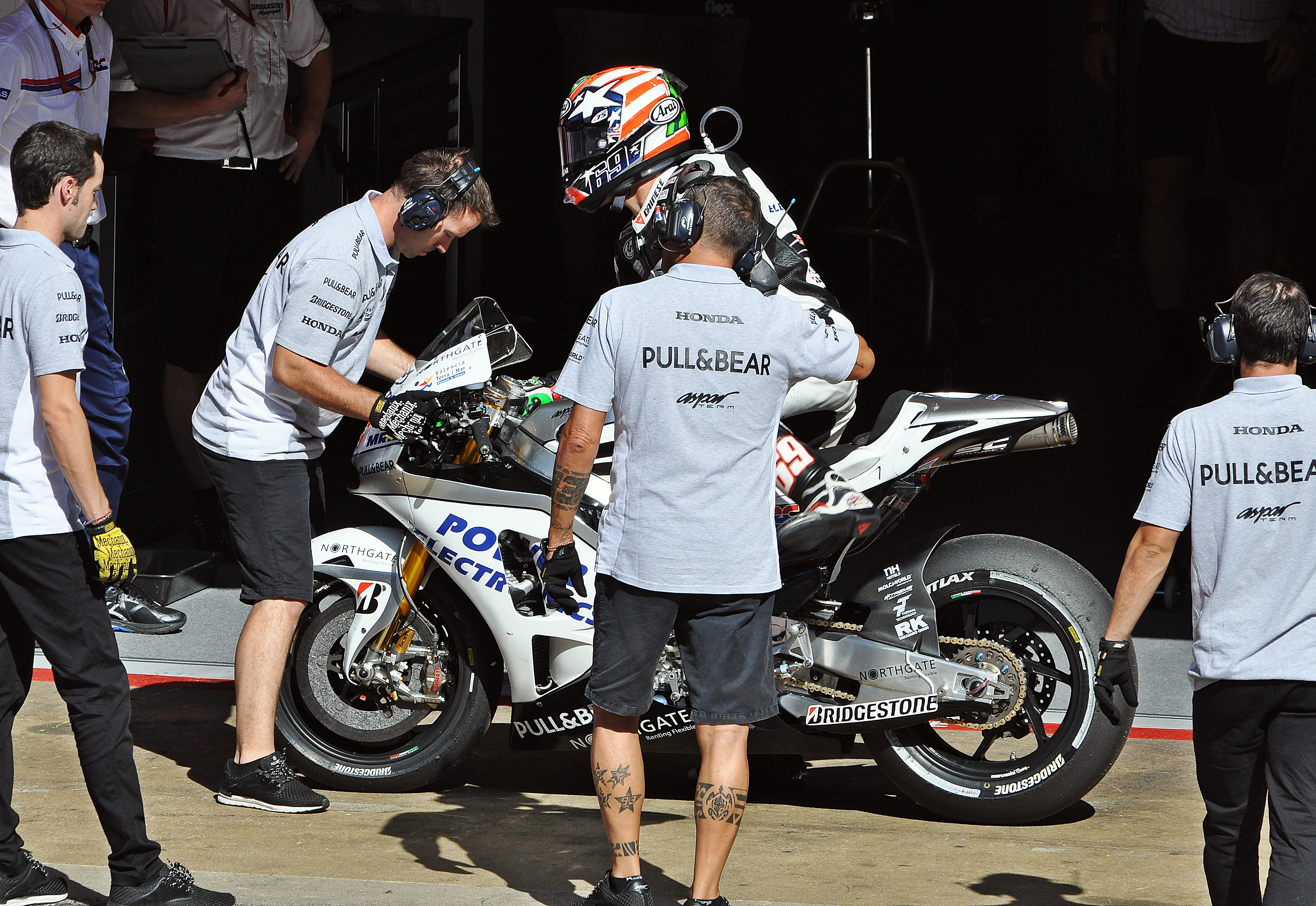
Hayden at the 2015 Catalan Grand Prix

For the 2015 season, Hayden remained with the Aspar Racing Team, to ride a new open-specification Honda RC213V-RS. He was joined in the team by Eugene Laverty, who moved across from the Superbike World Championship.

Hayden had the worst start of the season since he started racing in the MotoGP class in 2004. He finished outside of the points at the opening round in Qatar with a 17th place, but fared better at the Americas where he crossed the line in 13th. However, in the following two rounds—the Argentine and Spanish GPs—Hayden finished outside of the points once more when he finished 16th and 17th. At round five in France, he achieved a season-best finish of 11th place and became the top Open-class rider of the race.

At the Italian and Catalan grands prix, Hayden retired two consecutive times. In Mugello, Nicky Hayden crashed out of the race at turn four on the fourth lap and in Catalunya, he was forced wide into the gravel on the opening lap to avoid a collision and then crashed himself on the 14th lap at turn five. Later he stated that he was "annoyed and frustrated" for making so many mistakes that cost him from obtaining a better result at this race.

Hayden failed to score any points for the next four consecutive races—three consecutive 16th positions in the Netherlands, Germany and Indianapolis and one 17th position in the Czech Republic. At round 12 in Great Britain, Hayden finished in 12th place, before failing to score any points once more at the next round in San Marino after finishing in 17th place. In Aragón and Japan, Hayden would score the last points of his MotoGP career by finishing in 15th and 13th places.

At the Australian round, he would retire for the third time this season. He was forced to retire due to technical problems with the bike. At the last two rounds of the season in Malaysia and at the Valencian Community, he finished in 16th and 17th positions.

==== Marc VDS Racing Team and Repsol Honda ====
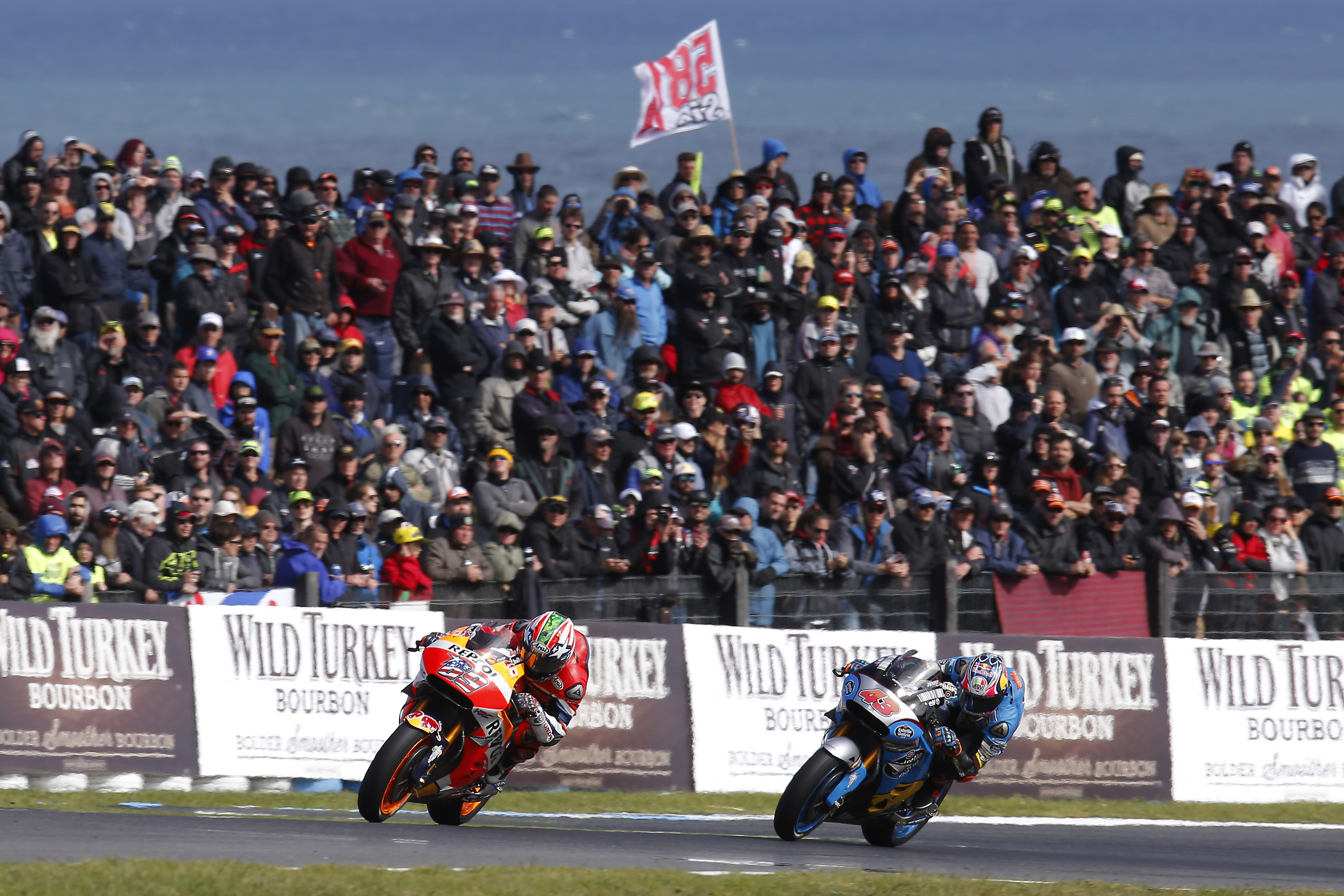
Hayden and Jack Miller at the 2016 Australian Grand Prix

Hayden moved to the Superbike World Championship in 2016, but made two one-off spot starts when Honda riders were injured during the season.

After Estrella Galicia 0,0 Marc VDS star Jack Miller was ruled out for the Aragón round, Hayden was called by Honda in a substitute role. He finished the race in 15th position, ensuring that he had scored at least one point in 14 consecutive seasons—every MotoGP season he had so far participated in. He said that he underestimated the task of adapting to the new Michelin tires but that his progress through the weekend was such that he was left longing to qualify and race again.

After Dani Pedrosa was ruled out of racing at the Australian GP due to a broken collarbone he sustained after high-siding during practice for the Japanese round, Hayden was called to replace him for this round. marking his return to the squad since 2008. He finished outside of the points in 17th position after a collision with Jack Miller at turn four fighting for 9th place late in the race —who he had replaced just two rounds earlier—made him slide into the gravel and outside the points.

=== Superbike World Championship ===
On October 8, 2015, it was announced – at the pre-race press conference for the Japanese Grand Prix – that Hayden would move to the Superbike World Championship for the 2016 season. Hayden replaced Sylvain Guintoli at the Ten Kate Racing-run Honda squad, alongside Michael van der Mark.

==== 2016 ====
After strong pre-season testing results, Hayden finished his first race weekend with ninth and fourth at Phillip Island. At Assen, round four, Hayden scored his first podium finish with a third place in the opening race, running with the leaders before backing off in the closing stages. At Sepang, round six, Hayden qualified fourth on the grid behind the Kawasakis of Jonathan Rea and Tom Sykes, and the Yamaha of Alex Lowes. After an eighth place in the first race, Hayden made a good start in the damp conditions of the second race, and overtook Lowes into turn two, before challenging the Kawasakis for the lead. Hayden went around the outside of Sykes into turn five and followed Rea for the majority of the lap, making a strong move into the penultimate corner. Hayden established a four-second gap over Rea and the now chasing Ducatis of Chaz Davies and Davide Giugliano. As the race entered the last 10 laps, Giugliano moved into second ahead of Rea and Davies, halving Hayden's lead with four laps to go. Giugliano was one second behind coming onto the final lap but Hayden held the gap to win his first World Superbike race, taking Honda's first win of the season in the process.

==== 2017 ====
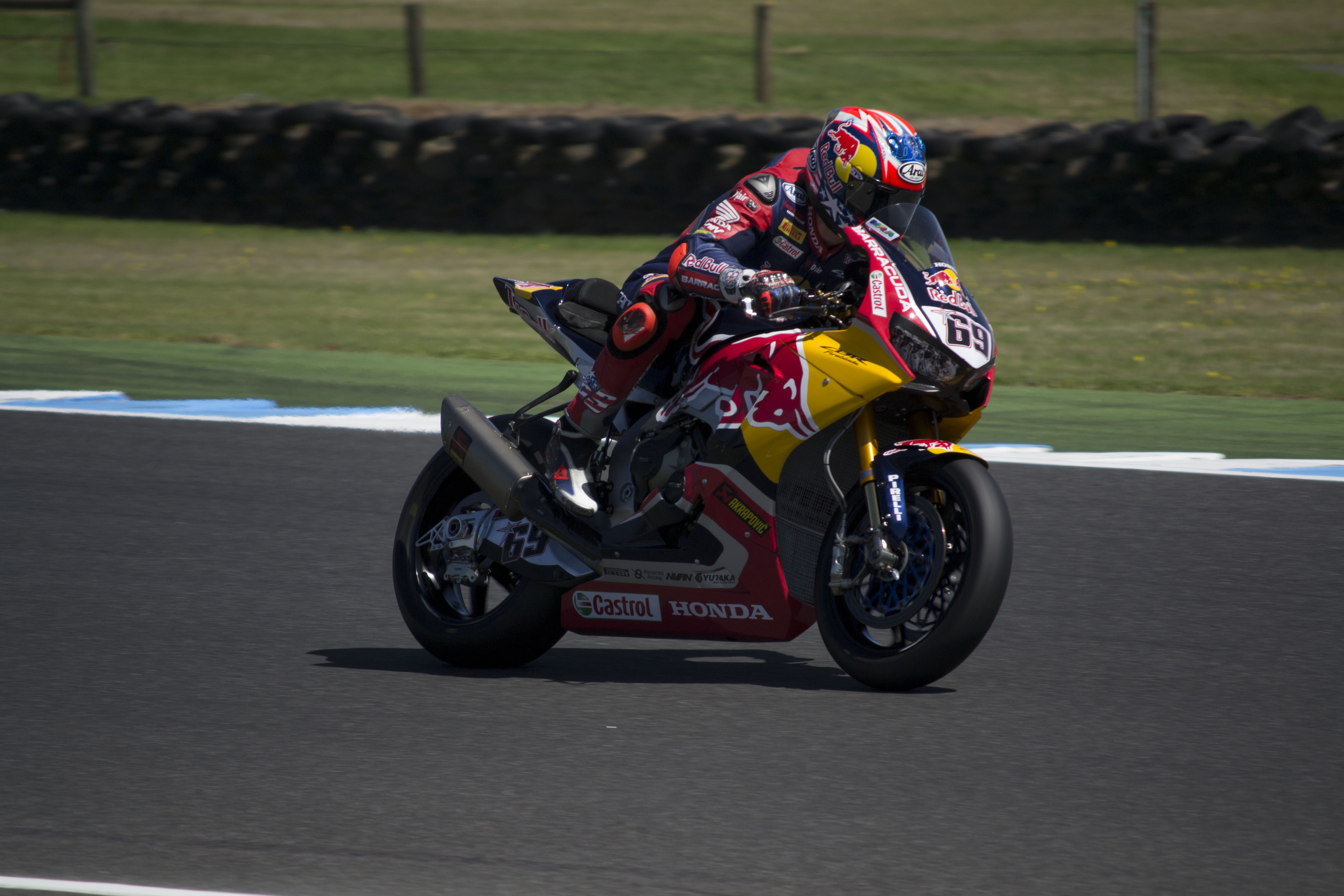
Hayden during Superpole 2 at Phillip Island in 2017

Hayden remained at Ten Kate Honda (now known as the Red Bull Honda World Superbike Team) for the 2017 season, partnered by Stefan Bradl. A slow start to the season saw mixed results and three retirements. His best result of the season was a seventh-place finish in Thailand. Hayden's final race was the second race of the Motul Italian Round held on May 14, 2017, where he finished in 12th place. He was in 13th place overall in the championship at the time of his death.

== Honors ==
The FIM named him a Legend in November 2015 prior to the Valencian Grand Prix.

In 2017, the AMA Horizon Award was renamed in honor of Nicky Hayden. The Nicky Hayden AMA Horizon Award is presented annually to outstanding amateur rides in dirt track, motocross and road racing.

During the 2018 Red Bull Grand Prix of the Americas at Circuit of The Americas, Nicky Hayden's number, 69, was spray painted on turn 18 and officially renamed, "Hayden Hill" in honor of the former American racer.

On June 8, 2018, the City of Owensboro unveiled the Nicky Hayden Memorial Sculpture honoring the late Owensboro native champion. The bronze sculpture was commissioned by the city and the Hayden family, and created by George Lundeen.

In 2018, Mayor of Owensboro, Tom Watson declared June 9 as Nicky Hayden Day, representing his racing number 69.

In 2018, the AMA Motorcycle Hall of Fame bypassed the traditional five-year rule for a competitor to be retired, and Nicky Hayden was voted as a 2018 inductee into their Hall of Fame.

In 2021, Hayden was inducted into the Motorsports Hall of Fame of America.

== Personal life ==
Hayden was born into a Roman Catholic family with which he retained a strong connection throughout his entire life, even living in an apartment above his family while the rest of the MotoGP riders lived in Europe. He had two brothers, Tommy and Roger Lee, both professional motorcycle racers, and two sisters, Jenny and Kathleen. In 2010, Tommy raced in the AMA, and Roger Lee competed in the Superbike World Championship.

His traditional racing number, 69, was the same number his father Earl used. His father jokes that the number was selected because it could still be read when he frequently ended up upside down in the dirt.

Hayden became engaged to Jackie Marin in May 2016.

== Death ==
On May 17, 2017, Hayden was hit by a driver while riding his bicycle near Rimini, Italy. Hayden was riding alone at the time of the accident which took place at around 14:00 CEST (UTC+2). Earlier in the morning Hayden was out running with Kevin Schwantz. He invited Schwantz to ride with him in the afternoon but Schwantz declined as he did not have a bicycle on hand. Hayden then rode briefly with his friend Denis Pazzaglini at some point in the early afternoon. Hayden's final Instagram photo shows the two together.

The crash occurred at the intersection of Via Ca' Raffaelli and Via Tavoleto in Misano Adriatico. Hayden was traveling west on Via Ca' Raffaelli when he was struck by a Peugeot 206 CC as he entered the street to cross Via Tavoleto. According to Italian newspaper La Gazzetta dello Sport, a home surveillance camera installed several metres away from the intersection recorded the entire accident. Hayden apparently did not halt at a stop sign and was possibly distracted by his iPod which was found by investigators at the scene of the crash.

The driver of the car stated that he was on his way to work when Hayden passed through a stop sign and suddenly appeared in front of him. He was unable to avoid a collision. The speed of the car was not known but the impact of Hayden slamming into the windshield was strong enough to completely shatter it and dent down the roof of the car. Hayden's bicycle was found in the nearby ditch with its frame snapped in half. Riccione Municipal Police are in possession of the crash video and the result of their investigation was expected to be reported some time in July.

Hayden was taken to Rimini hospital with severe injuries, and was subsequently moved to the major trauma unit at the Maurizio Bufalini Hospital in Cesena for possible surgery. Hayden's injuries were so severe that he was not placed into a medically induced coma and did not receive any surgery. Whether Hayden was at all conscious or in a natural coma during his last days is not known.

The extent of Hayden's injuries was described as polytrauma including a traumatic brain injury that resulted in severe cerebral damage. He also suffered a broken femur, broken pelvis, and multiple fractured vertebrae. As a result of the injuries, Hayden was placed on life support in an intensive care unit. After no signs of recovery, Hayden died in the hospital on May 22, 2017, five days after the accident. He was 35 years old.

In September 2017, results of the accident investigation were released. The report placed 70 percent blame on the driver, and 30 percent blame on Hayden. The report said that the car was traveling at approximately 73 kilometres per hour (45 mph) in a 50 kilometres per hour (31 mph) zone, and there was no indication that the driver braked prior to colliding with Hayden. Hayden had been traveling at 20 kilometres per hour (12 mph), and entered the intersection without heeding the stop sign.

== Racing history ==
=== MotoGP ===
- Team(s): Repsol Honda, Ducati Corse, Drive M7 Aspar Team, Estrella Galicia 0,0 Marc VDS
- Motorcycle(s): Honda RC211V, Honda RC212V, Ducati Desmosedici, Honda RCV1000R, Honda RC213V-RS, Honda RC213V
- First MotoGP Race: April 6, 2003 – Suzuka – Seventh Place
- First MotoGP Podium: October 5, 2003 – Motegi – Third Place
- First MotoGP Win: July 10, 2005 – Mazda Raceway Laguna Seca
- Number of MotoGP Wins: 3
- Number of MotoGP Podiums: 28
- Highest Championship Position: First Place (2006)

=== Superbike World Championship ===
- Team(s): American Honda, Honda World Superbike Team
- Motorcycle(s): Honda RC51, Honda CBR1000RR
- First Superbike Race: July 14, 2002 – Mazda Raceway Laguna Seca – Fourth Place
- First Superbike Podium: April 16, 2016 – Assen – Third Place
- First Superbike Win: May 15, 2016 – Sepang
- Number of Superbike Wins: 1
- Number of Superbike Podiums: 4
- Highest Championship Position: Fifth Place (2016)

=== AMA Superbike ===
- Team(s): American Honda, HRC
- Motorcycle(s): Honda RC51, Honda RC45
- First Superbike Race: April 18, 1999 – Willow Springs International Raceway – 12th Place
- First Superbike Win: June 11, 2000 – Road America
- First Superbike Podium: September 19, 1999 – Pikes Peak International Raceway – Third Place
- Number of Superbike Wins: 17
- Number of Superbike Podiums: 30
- Highest Championship Position: First Place (2002)

=== AMA 600 Supersport ===
- Team(s): American Honda, Erion Honda, HyperCycle Suzuki
- Motorcycle(s): Honda CBR600F3, Honda CBR600F4, Suzuki GSX-R600
- First 600 Supersport Win: April 26, 1998 – Willow Springs International Raceway
- Number of 600 Supersport Wins: 6
- Highest Championship Position: First Place (1999)

=== AMA 750 Supersport ===
- Team(s): HyperCycle Suzuki
- Motorcycle(s): Suzuki GSX-R750
- First 750 Supersport Win: April 19, 1998 – Mazda Raceway Laguna Seca
- Number of 750 Supersport Wins: 5
- Highest Championship Position: Fourth Place (1998)

=== AMA Formula Extreme ===
- Team(s): Erion Honda
- Motorcycle(s): Honda CBR900RR
- First Formula Extreme Win: April 26, 1999 – Willow Springs International Raceway
- Number of Formula Extreme Wins: 7
- Highest Championship Position: Second Place (1999)

== Career statistics ==
=== Supersport World Championship ===
==== Races by year ====
(key) (Races in bold indicate pole position; races in italics indicate fastest lap)

| Year | Bike | 1 | 2 | 3 | 4 | 5 | 6 | 7 | 8 | 9 | 10 | Pos | Pts |
|---|---|---|---|---|---|---|---|---|---|---|---|---|---|
| 1998 | Suzuki | GBR | ITA | SPA | GER | SMR | RSA | USA; Ret | EUR | AUT | NED | NC | 0 |

=== Superbike World Championship ===
==== By season ====
| Season | Motorcycle | Team | Race | Win | Podium | Pole | FLap | Pts | Plcd |
|---|---|---|---|---|---|---|---|---|---|
| 2002 | Honda RC51 | American Honda | 2 | 0 | 0 | 0 | 0 | 16 | 26th |
| 2016 | Honda CBR1000RR | Honda World Superbike Team | 26 | 1 | 4 | 0 | 0 | 248 | 5th |
| 2017 | Honda CBR1000RR | Red Bull Honda World Superbike Team | 10 | 0 | 0 | 0 | 0 | 40 | 17th |
| Total | | | **38** | **1** | **4** | **0** | **0** | **304** | |

==== Races by year ====
(key) (Races in bold indicate pole position; races in italics indicate fastest lap)

| Year | Bike | 1 | | 2 | | 3 | | 4 | | 5 | | 6 | | 7 | | 8 | | 9 | | 10 | | 11 | | 12 | | 13 | | Pos | Pts |
| Year | Bike | R1 | R2 | R1 | R2 | R1 | R2 | R1 | R2 | R1 | R2 | R1 | R2 | R1 | R2 | R1 | R2 | R1 | R2 | R1 | R2 | R1 | R2 | R1 | R2 | R1 | R2 | Pos | Pts |
|---|---|---|---|---|---|---|---|---|---|---|---|---|---|---|---|---|---|---|---|---|---|---|---|---|---|---|---|---|---|
| 2002 | Honda | SPA | SPA | AUS | AUS | RSA | RSA | JPN | JPN | ITA | ITA | GBR | GBR | GER | GER | SMR | SMR | USA; 4 | USA; 13 | GBR | GBR | GER | GER | NED | NED | ITA | ITA | 26th | 16 |
| 2016 | Honda | AUS; 9 | AUS; 4 | THA; Ret | THA; 5 | ARA; 6 | ARA; Ret | NED; 3 | NED; 6 | ITA; 9 | ITA; 8 | MAL; 8 | MAL; 1 | GBR; 5 | GBR; 6 | ITA; Ret | ITA; 6 | USA; 3 | USA; 5 | GER; 3 | GER; 10 | FRA; Ret | FRA; 9 | SPA; 4 | SPA; 4 | QAT; 5 | QAT; 7 | 5th | 248 |
| 2017 | Honda | AUS; 11 | AUS; Ret | THA; 9 | THA; 7 | ARA; 10 | ARA; Ret | NED; 14 | NED; 9 | ITA; Ret | ITA; 12 | GBR | GBR | ITA | ITA | USA | USA | GER | GER | POR | POR | FRA | FRA | SPA | SPA | QAT | QAT | 17th | 40 |

=== Grand Prix motorcycle racing ===
==== By season ====
| Season | Class | Motorcycle | Team | Race | Win | Podium | Pole | FLap | Pts | Plcd | WCh |
|---|---|---|---|---|---|---|---|---|---|---|---|
| 2003 | MotoGP | Honda RC211V | Repsol Honda Team | 16 | 0 | 2 | 0 | 0 | 130 | 5th | – |
| 2004 | MotoGP | Honda RC211V | Repsol Honda Team | 15 | 0 | 2 | 0 | 0 | 117 | 8th | – |
| 2005 | MotoGP | Honda RC211V | Repsol Honda Team | 17 | 1 | 6 | 3 | 2 | 206 | **3rd** | – |
| 2006 | MotoGP | Honda RC211V | Repsol Honda Team | 17 | 2 | 10 | 1 | 2 | 252 | **1st** | 1 |
| 2007 | MotoGP | Honda RC212V | Repsol Honda Team | 18 | 0 | 3 | 1 | 1 | 127 | 8th | – |
| 2008 | MotoGP | Honda RC212V | Repsol Honda Team | 16 | 0 | 2 | 0 | 1 | 155 | 6th | – |
| 2009 | MotoGP | Ducati GP9 | Ducati Marlboro Team | 17 | 0 | 1 | 0 | 0 | 104 | 13th | – |
| 2010 | MotoGP | Ducati GP10 | Ducati Team | 18 | 0 | 1 | 0 | 0 | 163 | 7th | – |
| 2011 | MotoGP | Ducati GP11 | Ducati Team | 17 | 0 | 1 | 0 | 1 | 132 | 8th | – |
| 2012 | MotoGP | Ducati GP12 | Ducati Team | 16 | 0 | 0 | 0 | 0 | 122 | 9th | – |
| 2013 | MotoGP | Ducati GP13 | Ducati Team | 18 | 0 | 0 | 0 | 0 | 126 | 9th | – |
| 2014 | MotoGP | Honda RCV1000R | Drive M7 Aspar | 13 | 0 | 0 | 0 | 0 | 47 | 16th | – |
| 2015 | MotoGP | Honda RC213V-RS | Aspar MotoGP Team | 18 | 0 | 0 | 0 | 0 | 16 | 20th | – |
| 2016 | MotoGP | Honda RC213V | EG 0,0 Marc VDS | 2 | 0 | 0 | 0 | 0 | 1 | 26th | – |
| 2016 | MotoGP | Honda RC213V | Repsol Honda Team | 2 | 0 | 0 | 0 | 0 | 1 | 26th | – |
| Total | | | | **218** | **3** | **28** | **5** | **7** | **1698** | | **1** |

==== By class ====
| Class | Seasons | 1st GP | 1st Pod | 1st Win | Race | Win | Podiums | Pole | FLap | Pts | WChmp |
|---|---|---|---|---|---|---|---|---|---|---|---|
| MotoGP | 2003–2016 | 2003 Japan | 2003 Pacific | 2005 United States | 218 | 3 | 28 | 5 | 7 | 1,698 | 1 |
| Total | 2003–2016 | | | | **218** | **3** | **28** | **5** | **7** | **1,698** | **1** |

==== Races by year ====
(key) (Races in bold indicate pole position; races in italics indicate fastest lap)

| Year | Class | Bike | 1 | 2 | 3 | 4 | 5 | 6 | 7 | 8 | 9 | 10 | 11 | 12 | 13 | 14 | 15 | 16 | 17 | 18 | Pos | Pts |
|---|---|---|---|---|---|---|---|---|---|---|---|---|---|---|---|---|---|---|---|---|---|---|
| 2003 | MotoGP | Honda | JPN; 7 | RSA; 7 | SPA; Ret | FRA; 12 | ITA; 12 | CAT; 9 | NED; 11 | GBR; 8 | GER; 5 | CZE; 6 | POR; 9 | RIO; 5 | PAC; 3 | MAL; 4 | AUS; 3 | VAL; 16 | | | 5th | 130 |
| 2004 | MotoGP | Honda | RSA; 5 | SPA; 5 | FRA; 11 | ITA; Ret | CAT; Ret | NED; 5 | RIO; 3 | GER; 3 | GBR; 4 | CZE; Ret | POR | JPN; Ret | QAT; 5 | MAL; 4 | AUS; 6 | VAL; Ret | | | 8th | 117 |
| 2005 | MotoGP | Honda | SPA; Ret | POR; 7 | CHN; 9 | FRA; 6 | ITA; 6 | CAT; 5 | NED; 4 | **USA**; 1 | GBR; Ret | **GER**; 3 | CZE; 5 | JPN; 7 | MAL; 4 | QAT; 3 | **AUS**; 2 | TUR; 3 | VAL; 2 | | 3rd | 206 |
| 2006 | MotoGP | Honda | SPA; 3 | QAT; 2 | TUR; 3 | CHN; 2 | FRA; 5 | ITA; 3 | CAT; 2 | NED; 1 | GBR; 7 | GER; 3 | USA; 1 | CZE; 9 | MAL; 4 | **AUS**; 5 | JPN; 5 | POR; Ret | VAL; 3 | | 1st | 252 |
| 2007 | MotoGP | Honda | QAT; 8 | SPA; 7 | TUR; 7 | CHN; 12 | FRA; Ret | ITA; 10 | CAT; 11 | GBR; 17 | NED; 3 | GER; 3 | USA; Ret | CZE; 3 | RSM; 13 | **POR**; 4 | JPN; 9 | AUS; Ret | MAL; 9 | VAL; 8 | 8th | 127 |
| 2008 | MotoGP | Honda | QAT; 10 | SPA; 4 | POR; Ret | CHN; 6 | FRA; 8 | ITA; 13 | CAT; 8 | GBR; 7 | NED; 4 | GER; 13 | USA; 5 | CZE | RSM; DNS | INP; 2 | JPN; 5 | AUS; 3 | MAL; 4 | VAL; 5 | 6th | 155 |
| 2009 | MotoGP | Ducati | QAT; 12 | JPN; Ret | SPA; 15 | FRA; 12 | ITA; 12 | CAT; 10 | NED; 8 | USA; 5 | GER; 8 | GBR; 15 | CZE; 6 | INP; 3 | RSM; Ret | POR; 8 | AUS; 15 | MAL; 5 | VAL; 5 | | 13th | 104 |
| 2010 | MotoGP | Ducati | QAT; 4 | SPA; 4 | FRA; 4 | ITA; Ret | GBR; 4 | NED; 7 | CAT; 8 | GER; 7 | USA; 5 | CZE; 6 | INP; 6 | RSM; Ret | ARA; 3 | JPN; 12 | MAL; 6 | AUS; 4 | POR; 5 | VAL; Ret | 7th | 163 |
| 2011 | MotoGP | Ducati | QAT; 9 | SPA; 3 | POR; 9 | FRA; 7 | CAT; 8 | GBR; 4 | NED; 5 | ITA; 10 | GER; 8 | USA; 7 | CZE; 7 | INP; 14 | RSM; Ret | ARA; 7 | JPN; 7 | AUS; 7 | MAL; C | VAL; Ret | 8th | 132 |
| 2012 | MotoGP | Ducati | QAT; 6 | SPA; 8 | POR; 11 | FRA; 6 | CAT; 9 | GBR; 7 | NED; 6 | GER; 10 | ITA; 7 | USA; 6 | INP; DNS | CZE | RSM; 7 | ARA; Ret | JPN; 8 | MAL; 4 | AUS; 8 | VAL; Ret | 9th | 122 |
| 2013 | MotoGP | Ducati | QAT; 8 | AME; 9 | SPA; 7 | FRA; 5 | ITA; 6 | CAT; Ret | NED; 11 | GER; 9 | USA; 8 | INP; 9 | CZE; 8 | GBR; 8 | RSM; 9 | ARA; 9 | MAL; Ret | AUS; 7 | JPN; 9 | VAL; 8 | 9th | 126 |
| 2014 | MotoGP | Honda | QAT; 8 | AME; 11 | ARG; 11 | SPA; 11 | FRA; Ret | ITA; DNS | CAT; 12 | NED; 17 | GER; 14 | INP | CZE | GBR | RSM | ARA; 9 | JPN; 14 | AUS; 10 | MAL; Ret | VAL; 13 | 16th | 47 |
| 2015 | MotoGP | Honda | QAT; 17 | AME; 13 | ARG; 16 | SPA; 17 | FRA; 11 | ITA; Ret | CAT; Ret | NED; 16 | GER; 16 | INP; 16 | CZE; 17 | GBR; 12 | RSM; 17 | ARA; 15 | JPN; 13 | AUS; Ret | MAL; 16 | VAL; 17 | 20th | 16 |
| 2016 | MotoGP | Honda | QAT | ARG | AME | SPA | FRA | ITA | CAT | NED | GER | AUT | CZE | GBR | RSM | ARA; 15 | JPN | AUS; 17 | MAL | VAL | 26th | 1 |

== See also ==
- Daijiro Kato
- Grand Prix motorcycle racing

== Bibliography ==
- Jonnum, Chris (July 15, 2007). The Haydens: Nicky, Tommy, and Roger, from OWB to MotoGP. David Bull Publishing. ISBN 978-1893618817.
- Hayden, Earl; May, Danny (August 7, 2014). The First Family of Racing. Butler Books. ISBN 978-1935497943.

| Preceded by Steve Crevier | AMA Supersport 600 Champion; 1999 | Succeeded by Kurtis Roberts |
