= Central Motorcycle Roadracing Association =

The Central Motorcycle Roadracing Association, CMRA for short, is an amateur level motorcycle racing league based in Texas that holds races and rider schools in the south central region of the United States. It is one of the most active motorcycle roadracing clubs in America.

The CMRA is a non-profit 501 c(7) organization with approximately 800 License Holders. It is managed by a seven-member Board of Directors.

To race in the series, a rider must have passed an accredited license school and hold a current racing license. CMRA offers a license school that is taught on Friday of every race weekend. The main purpose of the license school is to prepare newcomers for their first race. The license school on Friday is run in conjunction with either a CMRA racer practice or Ridesmart Motorcycle School.

The CMRA also welcomes volunteers to help with corner working on race weekends.

CMRA, once known as CRRC (Central Road Racing Club), has had more motorcycle roadracing champions (National and International) than any other road racing club in the world.

== License Holders ==
Non-Competition License: Allows volunteer participation as a race official along with benefits, including subscription to Roadracing World & Motorcycle Technology magazines, posting privileges on the CMRA Message Board, discounts and voting rights. A Non-Competition License does not include racing privileges of any kind. Cost is $110US.

Competition License: Required to race CMRA events. This is a CMRA competition license and includes all of the benefits the Non-Competition license, plus racing privileges (race number, trophies, etc.) Cost is $190US.

== CMRA Lap Records ==
Motorsport Ranch (1.3 mile)

Motorsport Ranch (1.7 mile) (clockwise)

Motorsport Ranch (1.7 mile) (counter clockwise)

Eagles Canyon Raceway (2.55 mile) (original configuration)

Eagles Canyon Raceway (1.65 mile)

Eagles Canyon Raceway (2.75 mile) (new Configuration) 1:54:440 Dustin Dominguez 8/5/23

Hallett Motor Racing Circuit (1.8 mile) (clockwise)

Hallett Motor Racing Circuit (1.8 mile) (counter clockwise)

MSR Houston (1.3 mile)

MSR Houston (2.38 mile) 1:31:844 Eddie Thornton 2/15/15

NOLA Motorsport Park (2.75 mile)

NOLA Motorsport Park (2.75 mile)

Oak Hill Raceway (1.8 mile) ??

Texas World Speedway (1.8 mile)

Texas World speedway (1.9 mile)

Texas World Speedway (2.9 mile) 1:41:415 Ty Howard 4/13/10
