= 2019 German motorcycle Grand Prix =

(Germany) 2019 German Grand Prix
Race details
- Race 9 of 19 races in the 2019 Grand Prix motorcycle racing season
- Date: 7 July 2019
- Official name: HJC Helmets Motorrad Grand Prix Deutschland
- Location: Sachsenring, Hohenstein-Ernstthal, Germany
- Course: Permanent racing facility; 3.671 km (2.281 mi)

MotoGP
Pole position
Rider	(Spain) Marc Márquez	Honda
Time	1:20.195	
Fastest lap
Rider	(Spain) Marc Márquez	Honda
Time	1:21.228 on lap 5	
Podium
First	(Spain) Marc Márquez	Honda
Second	(Spain) Maverick Viñales	Yamaha
Third	(United Kingdom) Cal Crutchlow	Honda

Moto2
Pole position
Rider	(Spain) Álex Márquez	Kalex
Time	1:23.585	
Fastest lap
Rider	(Spain) Álex Márquez	Kalex
Time	1:24.317 on lap 17	
Podium
First	(Spain) Álex Márquez	Kalex
Second	(South Africa) Brad Binder	KTM
Third	(Germany) Marcel Schrötter	Kalex

Moto3
Pole position
Rider	(Japan) Ayumu Sasaki	Honda
Time	1:26.135	
Fastest lap
Rider	(Turkey) Can Öncü	KTM
Time	1:26.714 on lap 3	
Podium
First	(Italy) Lorenzo Dalla Porta	Honda
Second	(Spain) Marcos Ramírez	Honda
Third	(Spain) Arón Canet	KTM

MotoE
Pole position
Rider	(Finland) Niki Tuuli	Energica
Time	1:27.456	
Fastest lap
Rider	(Finland) Niki Tuuli	Energica
Time	1:28.322 on lap 5	
Podium
First	(Finland) Niki Tuuli	Energica
Second	(United Kingdom) Bradley Smith	Energica
Third	(France) Mike Di Meglio	Energica

The 2019 German motorcycle Grand Prix was the ninth round of the 2019 MotoGP season. It was held at the Sachsenring in Hohenstein-Ernstthal on 7 July 2019.

This round featured the first MotoE race. The class was originally meant to make its début at Jerez, but a fire in the paddock during pre-season testing destroyed all 18 bikes that were prepared and the Jerez round was cancelled along with the Le Mans round. All teams in the MotoE class use the Energica Ego Corsa.

== Classification ==
=== MotoGP ===
Pos.	No.	Rider	Team	Manufacturer	Laps	Time/Retired	Grid	Points
1	93	(Spain) Marc Márquez	Repsol Honda Team	Honda	30	41:08.276	1	25
2	12	(Spain) Maverick Viñales	Monster Energy Yamaha MotoGP	Yamaha	30	+4.587	3	20
3	35	(United Kingdom) Cal Crutchlow	LCR Honda Castrol	Honda	30	+7.741	6	16
4	9	(Italy) Danilo Petrucci	Ducati Team	Ducati	30	+16.577	12	13
5	4	(Italy) Andrea Dovizioso	Ducati Team	Ducati	30	+16.669	13	11
6	43	(Australia) Jack Miller	Pramac Racing	Ducati	30	+16.836	5	10
7	36	(Spain) Joan Mir	Team Suzuki Ecstar	Suzuki	30	+17.156	9	9
8	46	(Italy) Valentino Rossi	Monster Energy Yamaha MotoGP	Yamaha	30	+19.110	11	8
9	21	(Italy) Franco Morbidelli	Petronas Yamaha SRT	Yamaha	30	+20.634	7	7
10	6	(Germany) Stefan Bradl	Repsol Honda Team	Honda	30	+22.708	14	6
11	53	(Spain) Tito Rabat	Reale Avintia Racing	Ducati	30	+26.345	22	5
12	44	(Spain) Pol Espargaró	Red Bull KTM Factory Racing	KTM	30	+26.574	8	4
13	29	(Italy) Andrea Iannone	Aprilia Racing Team Gresini	Aprilia	30	+32.753	16	3
14	30	(Japan) Takaaki Nakagami	LCR Honda Idemitsu	Honda	30	+32.925	10	2
15	17	(Czech Republic) Karel Abraham	Reale Avintia Racing	Ducati	30	+37.934	21	1
16	55	(Malaysia) Hafizh Syahrin	Red Bull KTM Tech3	KTM	30	+41.615	18	
17	63	(Italy) Francesco Bagnaia	Pramac Racing	Ducati	30	+56.189	17	
18	88	(Portugal) Miguel Oliveira	Red Bull KTM Tech3	KTM	30	+57.377	20	
Ret	41	(Spain) Aleix Espargaró	Aprilia Racing Team Gresini	Aprilia	28	Accident	15	
Ret	42	(Spain) Álex Rins	Team Suzuki Ecstar	Suzuki	18	Accident	4	
Ret	5	(France) Johann Zarco	Red Bull KTM Factory Racing	KTM	2	Accident	19	
Ret	20	(France) Fabio Quartararo	Petronas Yamaha SRT	Yamaha	1	Accident	2	

=== Moto2 ===
Pos.	No.	Rider	Manufacturer	Laps	Time/Retired	Grid	Points
1	73	(Spain) Álex Márquez	Kalex	28	39:35.101	1	25
2	41	(South Africa) Brad Binder	KTM	28	+1.208	17	20
3	23	(Germany) Marcel Schrötter	Kalex	28	+1.630	3	16
4	21	(Italy) Fabio Di Giannantonio	Speed Up	28	+4.116	4	13
5	12	(Switzerland) Thomas Lüthi	Kalex	28	+5.191	12	11
6	40	(Spain) Augusto Fernández	Kalex	28	+6.332	5	10
7	7	(Italy) Lorenzo Baldassarri	Kalex	28	+6.526	10	9
8	9	(Spain) Jorge Navarro	Speed Up	28	+8.177	11	8
9	88	(Spain) Jorge Martín	KTM	28	+10.538	7	7
10	10	(Italy) Luca Marini	Kalex	28	+13.591	2	6
11	22	(United Kingdom) Sam Lowes	Kalex	28	+13.656	13	5
12	45	(Japan) Tetsuta Nagashima	Kalex	28	+13.836	18	4
13	87	(Australia) Remy Gardner	Kalex	28	+13.996	9	3
14	33	(Italy) Enea Bastianini	Kalex	28	+15.064	24	2
15	5	(Italy) Andrea Locatelli	Kalex	28	+17.234	14	1
16	64	(Netherlands) Bo Bendsneyder	NTS	28	+18.077	15	
17	94	(Germany) Jonas Folger	Kalex	28	+18.232	20	
18	11	(Italy) Nicolò Bulega	Kalex	28	+19.852	16	
19	72	(Italy) Marco Bezzecchi	KTM	28	+26.424	19	
20	77	(Switzerland) Dominique Aegerter	MV Agusta	28	+30.791	21	
21	24	(Italy) Simone Corsi	Kalex	28	+36.693	22	
22	62	(Italy) Stefano Manzi	MV Agusta	28	+37.502	23	
23	4	(South Africa) Steven Odendaal	NTS	28	+37.655	27	
24	3	(Germany) Lukas Tulovic	KTM	28	+38.526	28	
25	16	(United States) Joe Roberts	KTM	28	+48.740	25	
26	18	(Andorra) Xavi Cardelús	KTM	28	+1:15.427	29	
Ret	27	(Spain) Iker Lecuona	KTM	27	Accident	6	
Ret	97	(Spain) Xavi Vierge	Kalex	12	Accident	8	
Ret	96	(United Kingdom) Jake Dixon	KTM	0	Accident	26	
WD	20	(Indonesia) Dimas Ekky Pratama	Kalex		Withdrew		
OFFICIAL MOTO2 REPORT

=== Moto3 ===
Pos.	No.	Rider	Manufacturer	Laps	Time/Retired	Grid	Points
1	48	(Italy) Lorenzo Dalla Porta	Honda	27	39:29.348	4	25
2	42	(Spain) Marcos Ramírez	Honda	27	+0.072	3	20
3	44	(Spain) Arón Canet	KTM	27	+0.120	22	16
4	55	(Italy) Romano Fenati	Honda	27	+0.185	5	13
5	25	(Spain) Raúl Fernández	KTM	27	+0.323	15	11
6	17	(United Kingdom) John McPhee	Honda	27	+0.445	10	10
7	79	(Japan) Ai Ogura	Honda	27	+0.678	16	9
8	24	(Japan) Tatsuki Suzuki	Honda	27	+0.749	14	8
9	71	(Japan) Ayumu Sasaki	Honda	27	+0.829	1	7
10	84	(Czech Republic) Jakub Kornfeil	KTM	27	+0.955	6	6
11	11	(Spain) Sergio García	Honda	27	+1.064	18	5
12	23	(Italy) Niccolò Antonelli	Honda	27	+2.239	17	4
13	12	(Czech Republic) Filip Salač	KTM	27	+6.379	13	3
14	61	(Turkey) Can Öncü	KTM	27	+6.648	12	2
15	14	(Italy) Tony Arbolino	Honda	27	+6.652	19	1
16	5	(Spain) Jaume Masiá	KTM	27	+6.685	21	
17	22	(Japan) Kazuki Masaki	KTM	27	+18.243	23	
18	82	(Italy) Stefano Nepa	KTM	27	+33.859	20	
19	16	(Italy) Andrea Migno	KTM	27	+33.882	28	
20	76	(Kazakhstan) Makar Yurchenko	KTM	27	+36.088	26	
21	75	(Spain) Albert Arenas	KTM	27	+36.123	7	
22	54	(Italy) Riccardo Rossi	Honda	27	+36.859	27	
23	28	(Germany) Dirk Geiger	KTM	27	+1:17.087	30	
24	69	(United Kingdom) Tom Booth-Amos	KTM	26	+1 lap	29	
Ret	7	(Italy) Dennis Foggia	KTM	26	Accident	8	
Ret	13	(Italy) Celestino Vietti	KTM	26	Accident	24	
Ret	40	(South Africa) Darryn Binder	KTM	26	Accident	25	
Ret	27	(Japan) Kaito Toba	Honda	18	Accident Damage	2	
Ret	19	(Argentina) Gabriel Rodrigo	Honda	5	Accident Damage	9	
Ret	21	(Spain) Alonso López	Honda	0	Accident	11	
OFFICIAL MOTO3 REPORT

=== MotoE ===
Pos.	No.	Rider	Laps	Time/Retired	Grid	Points
1	66	(Finland) Niki Tuuli	5	7:27.862	1	25
2	38	(United Kingdom) Bradley Smith	5	+0.442	7	20
3	63	(France) Mike Di Meglio	5	+0.567	4	16
4	4	(Spain) Héctor Garzó	5	+0.991	2	13
5	11	(Italy) Matteo Ferrari	5	+2.095	6	11
6	5	(San Marino) Alex de Angelis	5	+4.048	9	10
7	10	(Belgium) Xavier Siméon	5	+4.304	5	9
8	51	(Brazil) Eric Granado	5	+8.118	3	8
9	15	(Spain) Sete Gibernau	5	+9.254	13	7
10	18	(Spain) Nicolás Terol	5	+9.414	8	6
11	27	(Italy) Mattia Casadei	5	+9.557	10	5
12	7	(Italy) Niccolò Canepa	5	+9.674	12	4
13	2	(Switzerland) Jesko Raffin	5	+9.828	17	3
14	78	(France) Kenny Foray	5	+10.137	14	2
15	16	(Australia) Joshua Hook	5	+11.157	16	1
16	6	(Spain) María Herrera	5	+18.192	18	
17	14	(France) Randy de Puniet	5	+24.808	15	
Ret	32	(Italy) Lorenzo Savadori	4	Accident	11	
OFFICIAL MOTOE REPORT

- All bikes manufactured by Energica.

== Championship standings after the race ==
=== MotoGP ===
Pos.	Rider	Points
1	(Spain) Marc Márquez	185
2	(Italy) Andrea Dovizioso	127
3	(Italy) Danilo Petrucci	121
4	(Spain) Álex Rins	101
5	(Spain) Maverick Viñales	85
6	(Italy) Valentino Rossi	80
7	(Australia) Jack Miller	70
8	(France) Fabio Quartararo	67
9	(United Kingdom) Cal Crutchlow	67
10	(Spain) Pol Espargaró	56

=== Moto2 ===
Pos.	Rider	Points
1	(Spain) Álex Márquez	136
2	(Switzerland) Thomas Lüthi	128
3	(Spain) Augusto Fernández	102
4	(Italy) Lorenzo Baldassarri	97
5	(Spain) Jorge Navarro	97
6	(Germany) Marcel Schrötter	97
7	(Italy) Luca Marini	90
8	(South Africa) Brad Binder	84
9	(Italy) Enea Bastianini	58
10	(Japan) Tetsuta Nagashima	45

=== Moto3 ===
Pos.	Rider	Points
1	(Italy) Lorenzo Dalla Porta	125
2	(Spain) Arón Canet	123
3	(Italy) Niccolò Antonelli	87
4	(Spain) Marcos Ramírez	78
5	(Italy) Tony Arbolino	77
6	(United Kingdom) John McPhee	68
7	(Italy) Celestino Vietti	68
8	(Spain) Jaume Masiá	65
9	(Czech Republic) Jakub Kornfeil	52
10	(Japan) Kaito Toba	51

=== MotoE ===
Pos.	Rider	Points
1	(Finland) Niki Tuuli	25
2	(United Kingdom) Bradley Smith	20
3	(France) Mike Di Meglio	16
4	(Spain) Héctor Garzó	13
5	(Italy) Matteo Ferrari	11
6	(San Marino) Alex de Angelis	10
7	(Belgium) Xavier Siméon	9
8	(Brazil) Eric Granado	8
9	(Spain) Sete Gibernau	7
10	(Spain) Nicolás Terol	6

Previous race: 2019 Dutch TT	FIM Grand Prix World Championship; 2019 season	Next race: 2019 Czech Republic Grand Prix
Previous race: 2018 German Grand Prix	German motorcycle Grand Prix	Next race: 2021 German Grand Prix
