= Eric Granado =

Brazilian motorcycle racer

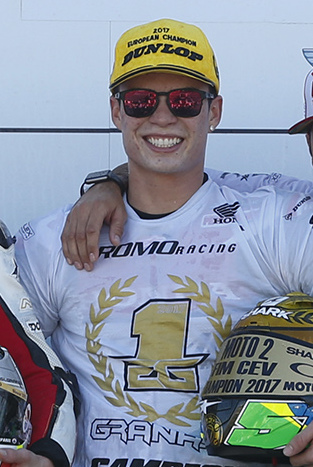
- Granado in 2017
- Born: June 10, 1996 (age 30); São Paulo, Brazil
- Current team: Joe Rascal Racing
- Bike number: 51
- Website: http://www.ericgranado.com.br/
Motorcycle racing career statistics
Moto2 World Championship
Active years	2012, 2017–2018
Manufacturers	Motobi, Kalex, Suter
Championships	0
2018 championship position	37th (0 pts)
Starts / Wins / Podiums / Poles / F. laps / Points; 22 / 0 / 0 / 0 / 0 / 0
Moto3 World Championship
Active years	2013–2014
Manufacturers	Kalex KTM, KTM
Championships	0
2014 championship position	31st (2 pts)
Starts / Wins / Podiums / Poles / F. laps / Points; 31 / 0 / 0 / 0 / 0 / 9
MotoE World Championship
Active years	2019–2025
Manufacturers	Energica, Ducati
Championships	0
2024 championship position	10th (112 pts)
Starts / Wins / Podiums / Poles / F. laps / Points; 72 / 13 / 27 / 13 / 15 / 793.5
Superbike World Championship
Active years	2020, 2023
Manufacturers	Ducati, Honda
Championships	0
2023 championship position	NC (0 pts)
Starts / Wins / Podiums / Poles / F. laps / Points; 31 / 0 / 0 / 0 / 0 / 5

Eric Granado Santos (born 10 June 1996) is a Brazilian Grand Prix motorcycle racer. He currently races in the Harley-Davidson Bagger World Cup for the team Joe Rascal Racing.

Granado was the 2017 FIM CEV Moto2 European Championship winner.

Granado competed in the Brazilian Superbike Championship, FIM CEV Moto2 European Championship in 2015, 2016 and 2017 aboard a Kalex Moto2.

== Career statistics ==
=== Moto 1000 GP ===
2015: 1st, GP 600 class

=== Brazilian Superbike Championship ===
Season	Bike	Team	Pos	Info
2017	Honda CBR1000RR	Honda Racing Corporation Brazil	1st	
2018	Honda CBR1000RR	Honda Racing Corporation Brazil	1st	
2019	Honda CBR1000RR	Honda Racing Corporation Brazil	1st	
2020	Honda CBR1000RR	Honda Racing Corporation Brazil	1st	
2024	Honda CBR1000RR	Honda Racing Corporation Brazil	1st	
2025	Honda CBR1000RR	Honda Racing Corporation Brazil	1st	

=== FIM CEV Moto2 European Championship ===
==== Races by year ====
(key) (Races in bold indicate pole position, races in italics indicate fastest lap)

Year	Bike	1	2	3	4	5	6	7	8	9	10	11	Pos	Pts
2015	Kalex	ALG1; 4	ALG2; 3	CAT; 8	ARA1; 5	ARA2; 5	ALB; 7	NAV1; Ret	NAV2; 3	JER; 7	VAL1; 6	VAL2; 5	6th	114
2016	Kalex	**VAL1**; 1	**VAL2**; Ret	ARA1; Ret	ARA2; 6	CAT1; 2	CAT2; 5	ALB; 4	ALG1; 6	ALG2; 6	JER; 6	VAL; 2	4th	129
2017	Kalex	ALB; 5	CAT1; 2	CAT2; 7	**VAL1**; 1	**VAL2**; 1	EST1; 1	EST2; 1	JER; 2	ARA1; 3	ARA2; 1	**VAL**; 1	1st	226

=== Grand Prix motorcycle racing ===
==== By season ====
Season	Class	Motorcycle	Team	Race	Win	Podium	Pole	FLap	Pts	Plcd
2012	Moto2	Motobi TSR6	JiR Moto2	11	0	0	0	0	0	NC
2013	Moto3	Kalex KTM	Mapfre Aspar Team Moto3	17	0	0	0	0	7	25th
2014	Moto3	KTM RC250GP	Calvo Team	14	0	0	0	0	2	31st
2017	Moto2	Kalex Moto2	Promoracing	1	0	0	0	0	0	39th
2018	Moto2	Suter MMX2	Forward Racing Team	10	0	0	0	0	0	37th
2019	MotoE	Energica Ego Corsa	Avintia Esponsorama Racing	6	2	2	1	2	71	**3rd**
2020	MotoE	Energica Ego Corsa	Avintia Esponsorama Racing	7	1	1	1	2	53	7th
2021	MotoE	Energica Ego Corsa	WithU Motorsport	7	2	3	4	4	84	4th
2022	MotoE	Energica Ego Corsa	LCR E-Team	12	5	8	1	4	192.5	**2nd**
2023	MotoE	Ducati V21L	LCR E-Team	14	1	4	2	1	139	7th
2024	MotoE	Ducati V21L	LCR E-Team	15	0	4	2	0	112	10th
2025	MotoE	Ducati V21L	LCR E-Team	11	2	5	2	2	162	4th
Total				**125**	**13**	**27**	**13**	**15**	**822.5**	

==== By class ====
Class	Seasons	1st GP	1st Pod	1st Win	Race	Win	Podiums	Pole	FLap	Pts	WChmp
Moto2	2012, 2017–2018	2012 Great Britain			22	0	0	0	0	0	0
Moto3	2013–2014	2013 Qatar			31	0	0	0	0	9	0
MotoE	2019–	2019 Germany	2019 Valencia Race 1	2019 Valencia Race 1	72	13	27	13	15	813.5	0
Total	2012–2014, 2017–				**125**	**13**	**27**	**13**	**15**	**822.5**	**0**

==== Races by year ====
(key) (Races in bold indicate pole position, races in italics indicate fastest lap)

Year	Class	Bike	1	2	3	4	5	6	7	8	9	10	11	12	13	14	15	16	17	18	19	Pos	Pts
2012	Moto2	Motobi	QAT	SPA	POR	FRA	CAT	GBR; 31	NED; 23	GER; 26	ITA; 21	INP; 25	CZE; 25	RSM	ARA; 25	JPN; 27	MAL; Ret	AUS; 25	VAL; 29			NC	0
2013	Moto3	Kalex KTM	QAT; 26	AME; 23	SPA; 19	FRA; 24	ITA; 9	CAT; 26	NED; 28	GER; Ret	INP; Ret	CZE; 22	GBR; 29	RSM; Ret	ARA; 16	MAL; 24	AUS; 21	JPN; 19	VAL; 17			25th	7
2014	Moto3	KTM	QAT; Ret	AME; 18	ARG; 19	SPA; Ret	FRA; DNS	ITA; 23	CAT; 23	NED; 19	GER; 14	INP; 22	CZE; 27	GBR; 26	RSM; 21	ARA; 17	JPN; 16	AUS; DNS	MAL	VAL		31st	2
2017	Moto2	Kalex	QAT	ARG	AME	SPA	FRA	ITA	CAT	NED	GER	CZE	AUT	GBR	RSM	ARA	JPN	AUS	MAL	VAL; 17		39th	0
2018	Moto2	Suter	QAT; 30	ARG; 29	AME; 22	SPA; Ret	FRA; Ret	ITA; 19	CAT; 25	NED; 24	GER; 21	CZE; 23	AUT	GBR	RSM	ARA	THA	JPN	AUS	MAL	VAL	37th	0
2019	MotoE	Energica	GER; 8	AUT; 17	RSM1; 13	RSM2; 6	**VAL1**; 1	**VAL2**; 1														3rd	71
2020	MotoE	Energica	**SPA**; 1	ANC; 13	RSM; 10	EMI1; Ret	EMI2; 7	FRA1; 6	FRA2; Ret													7th	53
2021	MotoE	Energica	**SPA**; 13	**FRA**; 1	**CAT**; Ret	**NED**; 1	AUT; 2	RSM1; Ret	RSM2; 5													4th	84
2022	MotoE	Energica	SPA1; 1	SPA2; 1	FRA1; 7	FRA2; 5	ITA1; 3	ITA2; 8	NED1; 2	NED2; 1^{‡}	**AUT1**; 1	**AUT2**; 1	RSM1; 17	RSM2; 3								2nd	192.5
2023	MotoE	Ducati	FRA1	FRA2	ITA1; 6	ITA2; 1	GER1; Ret	GER2; 4	NED1; 6	NED2; 4	**GBR1**; 3	**GBR2**; 2	AUT1; 2	AUT2; 18	CAT1; 12	CAT2; 10	RSM1; 14	RSM2; 17				7th	139
2024	MotoE	Ducati	**POR1**; Ret	**POR2**; 4	FRA1; 6	FRA2; Ret	**CAT1**; 2	**CAT2**; Ret	ITA1; 5	ITA2; 3	NED1; Ret	NED2; 12	GER1; Ret	GER2; DNS	AUT1; Ret	AUT2; 10	RSM1; 3	RSM2; 3				10th	112
2025	MotoE	Ducati	FRA1; Ret	FRA2; DNS	NED1; 7	NED2; 7	AUT1; 3	AUT2; Ret	HUN1; 3	HUN2; 7	**CAT1**; 1	**CAT2**; 1	**RSM1**; 4	**RSM2**; 2	POR1; 2	POR2; Ret						4th	162

^{‡} Half points awarded as less than two thirds of the race distance (but at least three full laps) was completed.

=== Harley-Davidson Bagger World Cup ===
==== Races by year ====
(key) (Races in bold indicate pole position, races in italics indicate fastest lap)

Year	1		2		3		4		5		6		Pos	Pts
Year	R1	R2	R1	R2	R1	R2	R1	R2	R1	R2	R1	R2	Pos	Pts
2026	**USA**; 6	**USA**; 2	**ITA**; 2	**ITA**; 2	**NED**; 1	**NED**; 3	GBR; 3	GBR; 2	SPA; Ret	SPA; 2	**AUT**; Ret	**AUT**; 1	3rd	192

=== Superbike World Championship ===
==== By season ====
Season	Class	Motorcycle	Team	Number	Race	Win	Podium	Pole	FLap	Pts	Plcd
2020	SBK	Ducati Panigale V4 R	Barni Racing Team	51	0	0	0	0	0	5	23rd
2023	SBK	Honda CBR1000RR-R	Petronas MIE Racing Honda Team	51	21	0	0	0	0	0	20th
Total					**25**	**0**	**0**	**0**	**5**	**0**	

==== Races by year ====
(key) (Races in bold indicate pole position) (Races in italics indicate fastest lap)

Year	Bike	1			2			3			4			5			6			7			8			9			10			11			12			Pos	Pts
Year	Bike	R1	SR	R2	R1	SR	R2	R1	SR	R2	R1	SR	R2	R1	SR	R2	R1	SR	R2	R1	SR	R2	R1	SR	R2	R1	SR	R2	R1	SR	R2	R1	SR	R2	R1	SR	R2	Pos	Pts
2020	Ducati	AUS	AUS	AUS	SPA	SPA	SPA	POR	POR	POR	SPA	SPA	SPA	SPA	SPA	SPA	SPA; 14	SPA; 18	SPA; 14	FRA	FRA	FRA	POR; Ret	POR; 15	POR; 15													23rd	5
2023	Honda	AUS; 16	AUS; 18	AUS; 19	INA; DNS	INA; 19	INA; DNS	NED; 21	NED; 21	NED; 17	SPA; Ret	SPA; DNS	SPA; DNS	EMI	EMI	EMI	GBR; 19	GBR; 24	GBR; 18	ITA; Ret	ITA; 24	ITA; 19	CZE; Ret	CZE; 17	CZE; Ret	FRA	FRA	FRA	SPA; Ret	SPA; Ret	SPA; 19	POR; 21	POR; DNS	POR; DNS	JER	JER	JER	NC	0
