= 2020 San Marino and Rimini Riviera motorcycle Grand Prix =

2020 San Marino and Rimini Riviera Grand Prix
Race details
- Race 7 of 15 races in the 2020 Grand Prix motorcycle racing season
- Date: 13 September 2020
- Official name: Gran Premio Lenovo di San Marino e della Riviera di Rimini
- Location: Misano World Circuit Marco Simoncelli; Misano Adriatico, Province of Rimini, Italy
- Course: Permanent racing facility; 4.226 km (2.626 mi)

MotoGP
Pole position
| Rider | (Spain) Maverick Viñales | Yamaha |
| Time | 1:31.411 | |
Fastest lap
| Rider | (Italy) Francesco Bagnaia | Ducati |
| Time | 1:32.706 on lap 8 | |
Podium
| First | (Italy) Franco Morbidelli | Yamaha |
| Second | (Italy) Francesco Bagnaia | Ducati |
| Third | (Spain) Joan Mir | Suzuki |

Moto2
Pole position
| Rider | (United Kingdom) Sam Lowes (Note: Sam Lowes, who set the fastest time in qualifying, was required to start from the pit lane as a penalty for irresponsible riding during the previous race. As a result, Remy Gardner was due to start the race from pole position but was declared unfit to race after a crash in warm-up. Luca Marini ultimately inherited the pole position grid slot, although Lowes was still credited with pole position.) | Kalex |
| Time | 1:36.170 | |
Fastest lap
| Rider | (Italy) Luca Marini | Kalex |
| Time | 1:37.013 on lap 4 | |
Podium
| First | (Italy) Luca Marini | Kalex |
| Second | (Italy) Marco Bezzecchi | Kalex |
| Third | (Italy) Enea Bastianini | Kalex |

Moto3
Pole position
| Rider | (Japan) Ai Ogura | Honda |
| Time | 1:42.403 | |
Fastest lap
| Rider | (Japan) Ryusei Yamanaka | Honda |
| Time | 1:42.752 on lap 6 | |
Podium
| First | (United Kingdom) John McPhee | Honda |
| Second | (Japan) Ai Ogura | Honda |
| Third | (Japan) Tatsuki Suzuki | Honda |

MotoE
Pole position
| Rider | (Italy) Matteo Ferrari (Note: Matteo Ferrari, who set the fastest time in qualifying, was given a 3-place grid penalty for irresponsible riding during the previous race. Mattia Casadei started the race from pole position, although Ferrari was still credited with pole position.) | Energica |
| Time | 1:43.580 | |
Fastest lap
| Rider | (Switzerland) Dominique Aegerter | Energica |
| Time | 1:43.261 on lap 3 | |
Podium
| First | (Italy) Matteo Ferrari | Energica |
| Second | (Belgium) Xavier Siméon | Energica |
| Third | (Switzerland) Dominique Aegerter | Energica |

The 2020 San Marino and Rimini Riviera motorcycle Grand Prix (officially known as the Gran Premio Lenovo di San Marino e della Riviera di Rimini) was the seventh round of the 2020 Grand Prix motorcycle racing season and the sixth round of the 2020 MotoGP World Championship. It was held at the Misano World Circuit Marco Simoncelli in Misano Adriatico on 13 September 2020.

== Background ==
=== Impact of the COVID-19 pandemic ===
The opening rounds of the 2020 championship were heavily affected by the COVID-19 pandemic. Several Grands Prix were cancelled or postponed after the aborted opening round in Qatar, prompting the Fédération Internationale de Motocyclisme to draft a new calendar. However, the San Marino and Rimini Riviera Grand Prix was not impacted by this change and kept its original date.

=== MotoGP Championship standings before the race ===
After the sixth round at the 2020 Styrian Grand Prix, Fabio Quartararo on 70 points, lead the championship by 3 points over Andrea Dovizioso with Jack Miller a further 14 points behind.

In the Teams' Championship, Petronas Yamaha SRT with 102 points, lead the championship from Monster Energy Yamaha with 93. Ducati Team sat one point behind the factory Yamaha in third, and 8 points ahead of fourth-placed KTM Factory Racing with 84 points, while Team Suzuki Ecstar sat 5th on 73 points.

=== MotoGP Entrants ===
- Stefan Bradl replaced Marc Márquez from the Czech Republic round onwards while he recovered from injuries sustained in his opening round crash.

== Free practice ==
The first practice session ended with Maverick Viñales fastest for Monster Energy Yamaha MotoGP ahead of Petronas Yamaha SRT's Fabio Quartararo and Aprilia Racing Team Gresini's Aleix Espargaró. The second practice session ended with Quartararo fastest, followed by Franco Morbidelli and Pol Espargaró.

=== Combined Free Practice 1-2-3 ===
The top ten riders (written in bold) qualified in Q2.

| Pos. | No. | Bikers | Constructor | Free practice times | | |
| Pos. | No. | Bikers | Constructor | FP1 | FP2 | FP3 |
|---|---|---|---|---|---|---|
| 1 | 46 | (Italy) **Valentino Rossi** | **Yamaha** | 1:33.693 | 1:32.732 | **1:31.861** |
| 2 | 12 | (Spain) **Maverick Viñales** | **Yamaha** | 1:32.198 | 1:32.742 | **1:31.936** |
| 3 | 20 | (France) **Fabio Quartararo** | **Yamaha** | 1:32.748 | 1:32.182 | **1:31.961** |
| 4 | 43 | (Australia) **Jack Miller** | **Ducati** | 1:33.502 | 1:33.368 | **1:32.129** |
| 5 | 42 | (Spain) **Álex Rins** | **Suzuki** | 1:34.040 | 1:33.015 | **1:32.206** |
| 6 | 36 | (Spain) **Joan Mir** | **Suzuki** | 1:33.497 | 1:33.124 | **1:32.238** |
| 7 | 63 | (Italy) **Francesco Bagnaia** | **Ducati** | 1:34.154 | 1:33.400 | **1:32.248** |
| 8 | 5 | (France) **Johann Zarco** | **Ducati** | 1:33.181 | 1:33.049 | **1:32.268** |
| 9 | 21 | (Italy) **Franco Morbidelli** | **Yamaha** | 1:33.694 | 1:32.367 | **1:32.281** |
| 10 | 4 | (Italy) **Andrea Dovizioso** | **Ducati** | 1:33.868 | 1:32.945 | **1:32.418** |
| 11 | 44 | (Spain) Pol Espargaró | KTM | 1:33.569 | **1:32.476** | 1:32.613 |
| 12 | 41 | (Spain) Aleix Espargaró | Aprilia | 1:32.949 | 1:32.936 | **1:32.567** |
| 13 | 30 | (Japan) Takaaki Nakagami | Honda | 1:33.654 | 1:32.975 | **1:32.630** |
| 14 | 27 | (Spain) Iker Lecuona | KTM | 1:34.533 | **1:32.675** | 1:32.702 |
| 15 | 9 | (Italy) Danilo Petrucci | Ducati | 1:34.101 | 1:32.825 | **1:32.695** |
| 16 | 88 | (Portugal) Miguel Oliveira | KTM | 1:34.645 | 1:32.935 | **1:32.791** |
| 17 | 33 | (South Africa) Brad Binder | KTM | 1:33.828 | **1:32.930** | 1:33.000 |
| 18 | 38 | (United Kingdom) Bradley Smith | Aprilia | **1:33.244** | 1:33.568 | 1:33.336 |
| 19 | 73 | (Spain) Álex Márquez | Honda | 1:33.921 | 1:33.806 | **1:33.251** |
| 20 | 53 | (Spain) Tito Rabat | Ducati | 1:34.619 | 1:33.923 | **1:33.270** |
| 21 | 6 | (Germany) Stefan Bradl | Honda | 1:34.323 | 1:33.631 | **1:33.523** |
| 22 | 35 | (United Kingdom) Cal Crutchlow | Honda | **1:33.538** | 1:33.696 | |
OFFICIAL MOTOGP COMBINED FREE PRACTICE TIMES REPORT

Fastest session lap

Personal Best lap

=== Free Practice 4 ===
The first three positions of the session were as follows.

| Pos. | No. | Rider | Constructor | FP4 Time |
|---|---|---|---|---|
| 1 | 20 | (France) Fabio Quartararo | Yamaha | 1:32.404 |
| 2 | 12 | (Spain) Maverick Viñales | Yamaha | 1:32.531 |
| 3 | 63 | (Italy) Francesco Bagnaia | Ducati | 1:32.762 |
OFFICIAL MOTOGP FREE PRACTICE 4 REPORT

== Qualifying ==
=== MotoGP ===
| Pos. | No. | Rider | Constructor | Qualifying times | | Final grid |
| Pos. | No. | Rider | Constructor | Q1 | Q2 | Final grid |
|---|---|---|---|---|---|---|
| 1 | 12 | (Spain) Maverick Viñales | Yamaha | Qualified in Q2 | 1:31.411 | 1 |
| 2 | 21 | (Italy) Franco Morbidelli | Yamaha | Qualified in Q2 | 1:31.723 | 2 |
| 3 | 20 | (France) Fabio Quartararo | Yamaha | Qualified in Q2 | 1:31.791 | 3 |
| 4 | 46 | (Italy) Valentino Rossi | Yamaha | Qualified in Q2 | 1:31.877 | 4 |
| 5 | 43 | (Australia) Jack Miller | Ducati | Qualified in Q2 | 1:32.052 | 5 |
| 6 | 63 | (Italy) Francesco Bagnaia | Ducati | Qualified in Q2 | 1:32.054 | 6 |
| 7 | 42 | (Spain) Álex Rins | Suzuki | Qualified in Q2 | 1:32.090 | 7 |
| 8 | 36 | (Spain) Joan Mir | Suzuki | Qualified in Q2 | 1:32.102 | 8 |
| 9 | 4 | (Italy) Andrea Dovizioso | Ducati | Qualified in Q2 | 1:32.184 | 9 |
| 10 | 5 | (France) Johann Zarco | Ducati | Qualified in Q2 | 1:32.218 | 10 |
| 11 | 44 | (Spain) Pol Espargaró | KTM | 1:32.064 | 1:32.266 | 11 |
| 12 | 88 | (Portugal) Miguel Oliveira | KTM | 1:32.212 | 1:32.323 | 12 |
| 13 | 41 | (Spain) Aleix Espargaró | Aprilia | 1:32.295 | N/A | 13 |
| 14 | 30 | (Japan) Takaaki Nakagami | Honda | 1:32.382 | N/A | 14 |
| 15 | 9 | (Italy) Danilo Petrucci | Ducati | 1:32.418 | N/A | 15 |
| 16 | 33 | (South Africa) Brad Binder | KTM | 1:32.534 | N/A | 16 |
| 17 | 53 | (Spain) Tito Rabat | Ducati | 1:32.791 | N/A | 17 |
| 18 | 27 | (Spain) Iker Lecuona | KTM | 1:32.838 | N/A | 18 |
| 19 | 6 | (Germany) Stefan Bradl | Honda | 1:32.915 | N/A | 19 |
| 20 | 38 | (United Kingdom) Bradley Smith | Aprilia | 1:33.166 | N/A | 20 |
| 21 | 73 | (Spain) Álex Márquez | Honda | 1:33.333 | N/A | 21 |
| | 35 | (United Kingdom) Cal Crutchlow | Honda | Did not participate | N/A | |
OFFICIAL MOTOGP QUALIFYING Nr. 1 REPORT
OFFICIAL MOTOGP QUALIFYING Nr. 2 REPORT

== Race ==
=== MotoGP ===
| Pos. | No. | Rider | Team | Manufacturer | Laps | Time/Retired | Grid | Points |
|---|---|---|---|---|---|---|---|---|
| 1 | 21 | (Italy) Franco Morbidelli | Petronas Yamaha SRT | Yamaha | 27 | 42:02.272 | 2 | 25 |
| 2 | 63 | (Italy) Francesco Bagnaia | Pramac Racing | Ducati | 27 | +2.217 | 6 | 20 |
| 3 | 36 | (Spain) Joan Mir | Team Suzuki Ecstar | Suzuki | 27 | +2.290 | 8 | 16 |
| 4 | 46 | (Italy) Valentino Rossi | Monster Energy Yamaha MotoGP | Yamaha | 27 | +2.643 | 4 | 13 |
| 5 | 42 | (Spain) Álex Rins | Team Suzuki Ecstar | Suzuki | 27 | +4.044 | 7 | 11 |
| 6 | 12 | (Spain) Maverick Viñales | Monster Energy Yamaha MotoGP | Yamaha | 27 | +5.383 | 1 | 10 |
| 7 | 4 | (Italy) Andrea Dovizioso | Ducati Team | Ducati | 27 | +10.358 | 9 | 9 |
| 8 | 43 | (Australia) Jack Miller | Pramac Racing | Ducati | 27 | +11.155 | 5 | 8 |
| 9 (Note: Takaaki Nakagami finished eighth on the track, but received a 1-position penalty for exceeding track limits on the last lap.) | 30 | (Japan) Takaaki Nakagami | LCR Honda Idemitsu | Honda | 27 | +10.839 | 14 | 7 |
| 10 | 44 | (Spain) Pol Espargaró | Red Bull KTM Factory Racing | KTM | 27 | +12.030 | 11 | 6 |
| 11 | 88 | (Portugal) Miguel Oliveira | Red Bull KTM Tech3 | KTM | 27 | +12.376 | 12 | 5 |
| 12 | 33 | (South Africa) Brad Binder | Red Bull KTM Factory Racing | KTM | 27 | +12.405 | 16 | 4 |
| 13 | 41 | (Spain) Aleix Espargaró | Aprilia Racing Team Gresini | Aprilia | 27 | +15.142 | 13 | 3 |
| 14 | 27 | (Spain) Iker Lecuona | Red Bull KTM Tech3 | KTM | 27 | +19.914 | 18 | 2 |
| 15 | 5 | (France) Johann Zarco | Esponsorama Racing | Ducati | 27 | +20.152 | 10 | 1 |
| 16 | 9 | (Italy) Danilo Petrucci | Ducati Team | Ducati | 27 | +22.094 | 15 | |
| 17 | 73 | (Spain) Álex Márquez | Repsol Honda Team | Honda | 27 | +22.473 | 21 | |
| 18 | 6 | (Germany) Stefan Bradl | Repsol Honda Team | Honda | 27 | +37.856 | 19 | |
| 19 | 38 | (United Kingdom) Bradley Smith | Aprilia Racing Team Gresini | Aprilia | 27 | +1:18.831 | 20 | |
| Ret | 53 | (Spain) Tito Rabat | Esponsorama Racing | Ducati | 22 | Accident | 17 | |
| Ret | 20 | (France) Fabio Quartararo | Petronas Yamaha SRT | Yamaha | 18 | Accident | 3 | |
| DNS | 35 | (United Kingdom) Cal Crutchlow | LCR Honda Castrol | Honda | | Did not start | | |
Fastest lap: (Italy) Francesco Bagnaia (Ducati) – 1:32.706 (lap 8)

=== Moto2 ===
| Pos. | No. | Rider | Manufacturer | Laps | Time/Retired | Grid | Points |
|---|---|---|---|---|---|---|---|
| 1 | 10 | (Italy) Luca Marini | Kalex | 25 | 40:41.774 | 1 | 25 |
| 2 | 72 | (Italy) Marco Bezzecchi | Kalex | 25 | +0.799 | 2 | 20 |
| 3 | 33 | (Italy) Enea Bastianini | Kalex | 25 | +0.897 | 3 | 16 |
| 4 | 97 | (Spain) Xavi Vierge | Kalex | 25 | +2.177 | 4 | 13 |
| 5 | 37 | (Spain) Augusto Fernández | Kalex | 25 | +8.307 | 6 | 11 |
| 6 | 12 | (Switzerland) Thomas Lüthi | Kalex | 25 | +9.046 | 10 | 10 |
| 7 | 21 | (Italy) Fabio Di Giannantonio | Speed Up | 25 | +9.971 | 8 | 9 |
| 8 | 22 | (United Kingdom) Sam Lowes | Kalex | 25 | +16.485 | 28 (Note: Pit lane start penalty.) | 8 |
| 9 | 44 | (Spain) Arón Canet | Speed Up | 25 | +17.036 | 20 | 7 |
| 10 | 16 | (United States) Joe Roberts | Kalex | 25 | +17.209 | 16 | 6 |
| 11 | 7 | (Italy) Lorenzo Baldassarri | Kalex | 25 | +17.741 | 18 | 5 |
| 12 | 42 | (Spain) Marcos Ramírez | Kalex | 25 | +19.152 | 9 | 4 |
| 13 | 19 | (Italy) Lorenzo Dalla Porta | Kalex | 25 | +21.946 | 14 | 3 |
| 14 | 24 | (Italy) Simone Corsi | MV Agusta | 25 | +22.005 | 21 | 2 |
| 15 | 11 | (Italy) Nicolò Bulega | Kalex | 25 | +24.404 | 17 | 1 |
| 16 | 96 | (United Kingdom) Jake Dixon | Kalex | 25 | +24.663 | 15 | |
| 17 | 62 | (Italy) Stefano Manzi | MV Agusta | 25 | +27.442 | 19 | |
| 18 | 35 | (Thailand) Somkiat Chantra | Kalex | 25 | +32.671 | 22 | |
| 19 | 64 | (Netherlands) Bo Bendsneyder | NTS | 25 | +35.844 | 24 | |
| 20 | 99 | (Malaysia) Kasma Daniel | Kalex | 25 | +46.463 | 23 | |
| Ret | 45 | (Japan) Tetsuta Nagashima | Kalex | 24 | Accident | 7 | |
| Ret | 55 | (Malaysia) Hafizh Syahrin | Speed Up | 21 | Accident | 12 | |
| Ret | 23 | (Germany) Marcel Schrötter | Kalex | 18 | Accident | 5 | |
| Ret | 27 | (Indonesia) Andi Farid Izdihar | Kalex | 16 | Accident | 25 | |
| Ret | 2 | (Switzerland) Jesko Raffin | NTS | 15 | Fatigue | 27 | |
| Ret | 57 | (Spain) Edgar Pons | Kalex | 12 | Mechanical | 26 | |
| Ret | 9 | (Spain) Jorge Navarro | Speed Up | 10 | Accident | 11 | |
| Ret | 40 | (Spain) Héctor Garzó | Kalex | 6 | Accident | 13 | |
| DNS | 87 | (Australia) Remy Gardner | Kalex | | Did not start | | |
OFFICIAL MOTO2 RACE REPORT

- Remy Gardner was declared unfit to start the race with hand & foot fractures suffered in a crash during Sunday warm-up.

=== Moto3 ===
| Pos. | No. | Rider | Manufacturer | Laps | Time/Retired | Grid | Points |
|---|---|---|---|---|---|---|---|
| 1 | 17 | (United Kingdom) John McPhee | Honda | 23 | 39:48.952 | 17 | 25 |
| 2 | 79 | (Japan) Ai Ogura | Honda | 23 | +0.037 | 1 | 20 |
| 3 | 24 | (Japan) Tatsuki Suzuki | Honda | 23 | +0.232 | 3 | 16 |
| 4 | 52 | (Spain) Jeremy Alcoba | Honda | 23 | +0.393 | 8 | 13 |
| 5 | 2 | (Argentina) Gabriel Rodrigo | Honda | 23 | +0.490 | 2 | 11 |
| 6 | 14 | (Italy) Tony Arbolino | Honda | 23 | +0.543 | 9 | 10 |
| 7 | 5 | (Spain) Jaume Masiá | Honda | 23 | +0.833 | 14 | 9 |
| 8 | 55 | (Italy) Romano Fenati | Husqvarna | 23 | +0.928 | 5 | 8 |
| 9 | 7 | (Italy) Dennis Foggia | Honda | 23 | +0.976 | 15 | 7 |
| 10 | 16 | (Italy) Andrea Migno | KTM | 23 | +1.121 | 4 | 6 |
| 11 | 23 | (Italy) Niccolò Antonelli | Honda | 23 | +1.554 | 20 | 5 |
| 12 | 6 | (Japan) Ryusei Yamanaka | Honda | 23 | +1.691 | 27 | 4 |
| 13 | 54 | (Italy) Riccardo Rossi | KTM | 23 | +1.921 | 12 | 3 |
| 14 | 82 | (Italy) Stefano Nepa | KTM | 23 | +1.961 | 16 | 2 |
| 15 | 99 | (Spain) Carlos Tatay | KTM | 23 | +2.239 | 22 | 1 |
| 16 | 53 | (Turkey) Deniz Öncü | KTM | 23 | +3.927 | 28 | |
| 17 | 27 | (Japan) Kaito Toba | KTM | 23 | +8.517 | 25 | |
| 18 | 9 | (Italy) Davide Pizzoli | KTM | 23 | +11.399 | 23 | |
| 19 | 50 | (Switzerland) Jason Dupasquier | KTM | 23 | +11.679 | 26 | |
| 20 | 12 | (Czech Republic) Filip Salač | Honda | 23 | +11.835 | 10 | |
| 21 | 89 | (Malaysia) Khairul Idham Pawi | Honda | 23 | +18.331 | 24 | |
| 22 | 73 | (Austria) Maximilian Kofler | KTM | 23 | +18.598 | 31 | |
| 23 | 92 | (Japan) Yuki Kunii | Honda | 23 | +18.891 | 30 | |
| 24 | 70 | (Belgium) Barry Baltus | KTM | 23 | +41.938 (Note: 38-second penalty.) | 29 | |
| 25 | 11 | (Spain) Sergio García | Honda | 23 | +1:01.077 | 11 | |
| Ret | 75 | (Spain) Albert Arenas | KTM | 21 | Accident | 13 | |
| Ret | 40 | (South Africa) Darryn Binder | KTM | 14 | Accident Damage | 19 | |
| Ret | 71 | (Japan) Ayumu Sasaki | KTM | 6 | Accident | 21 | |
| Ret | 21 | (Spain) Alonso López | Husqvarna | 6 | Accident Damage | 18 | |
| Ret | 25 | (Spain) Raúl Fernández | KTM | 0 | Collision Damage | 6 | |
| Ret | 13 | (Italy) Celestino Vietti | KTM | 0 | Collision | 7 | |
OFFICIAL MOTO3 RACE REPORT

=== MotoE ===
| Pos. | No. | Rider | Laps | Time/Retired | Grid | Points |
|---|---|---|---|---|---|---|
| 1 | 11 | (Italy) Matteo Ferrari | 7 | 12:14.331 | 4 (Note: 3-place grid penalty.) | 25 |
| 2 | 10 | (Belgium) Xavier Siméon | 7 | +0.213 | 2 | 20 |
| 3 | 77 | (Switzerland) Dominique Aegerter | 7 | +0.372 | 5 | 16 |
| 4 | 40 | (Spain) Jordi Torres | 7 | +0.474 | 7 | 13 |
| 5 | 27 | (Italy) Mattia Casadei | 7 | +0.606 | 1 | 11 |
| 6 | 63 | (France) Mike Di Meglio | 7 | +0.780 | 9 | 10 |
| 7 | 61 | (Italy) Alessandro Zaccone | 7 | +4.393 | 10 | 9 |
| 8 | 15 | (San Marino) Alex de Angelis | 7 | +4.476 | 16 | 8 |
| 9 | 70 | (Italy) Tommaso Marcon | 7 | +4.915 | 8 | 7 |
| 10 | 51 | (Brazil) Eric Granado | 7 | +5.056 | 18 | 6 |
| 11 | 7 | (Italy) Niccolò Canepa | 7 | +5.439 | 6 | 5 |
| 12 | 35 | (Germany) Lukas Tulovic | 7 | +5.705 | 3 | 4 |
| 13 | 55 | (Spain) Alejandro Medina | 7 | +8.448 | 12 | 3 |
| 14 | 18 | (Andorra) Xavi Cardelús | 7 | +8.582 | 13 | 2 |
| 15 | 6 | (Spain) María Herrera | 7 | +8.813 | 14 | 1 |
| 16 | 84 | (Czech Republic) Jakub Kornfeil | 7 | +11.795 | 17 | |
| 17 | 66 | (Finland) Niki Tuuli | 7 | +12.892 | 11 | |
| 18 | 16 | (Australia) Joshua Hook | 7 | +36.401 | 15 | |
OFFICIAL MOTOE RACE REPORT

- All bikes manufactured by Energica.

== Championship standings after the race ==
Below are the standings for the top five riders, constructors, and teams after the round.

=== MotoGP ===
Riders' Championship standings

| | Pos. | Rider | Points |
|---|---|---|---|
| 1 | 1 | (Italy) Andrea Dovizioso | 76 |
| 1 | 2 | (France) Fabio Quartararo | 70 |
| | 3 | (Australia) Jack Miller | 64 |
| 4 | 4 | (Spain) Joan Mir | 60 |
| | 5 | (Spain) Maverick Viñales | 58 |

Constructors' Championship standings

| | Pos. | Constructor | Points |
|---|---|---|---|
| | 1 | (Italy) Ducati | 107 |
| | 2 | (Austria) KTM | 88 |
| | 3 | (Japan) Suzuki | 73 |
| 1 | 4 | (Japan) Yamaha | 63 (Note: Yamaha scored 113 points as a manufacturer, but were deducted 50 points after failing to respect MSMA technical changes protocols.) |
| 1 | 5 | (Japan) Honda | 53 |

Teams' Championship standings

| | Pos. | Team | Points |
|---|---|---|---|
| | 1 | (Italy) Ducati Team | 101 |
| 2 | 2 | (Japan) Team Suzuki Ecstar | 100 |
| 2 | 3 | (Italy) Pramac Racing | 97 |
| 1 | 4 | (Japan) Monster Energy Yamaha MotoGP | 96 (Note: Monster Energy Yamaha MotoGP riders scored 116 points, but the team was deducted 20 points after failing to respect MSMA technical changes protocols.) |
| 3 | 5 | (Austria) Red Bull KTM Factory Racing | 94 |

=== Moto2 ===
Riders' Championship standings

| | Pos. | Rider | Points |
|---|---|---|---|
| | 1 | (Italy) Luca Marini | 112 |
| | 2 | (Italy) Enea Bastianini | 95 |
| 2 | 3 | (Italy) Marco Bezzecchi | 85 |
| 1 | 4 | (Spain) Jorge Martín | 79 |
| 1 | 5 | (Japan) Tetsuta Nagashima | 68 |

Constructors' Championship standings

| Pos. | Constructor | Points |
|---|---|---|
| 1 | (Germany) Kalex | 175 |
| 2 | (Italy) Speed Up | 57 |
| 3 | (Italy) MV Agusta | 17 |
| 4 | (Japan) NTS | 9 |

Teams' Championship standings

| Pos. | Team | Points |
|---|---|---|
| 1 | (Italy) Sky Racing Team VR46 | 197 |
| 2 | (Finland) Red Bull KTM Ajo | 147 |
| 3 | (Belgium) EG 0,0 Marc VDS | 103 |
| 4 | (Italy) Italtrans Racing Team | 98 |
| 5 | (Germany) Liqui Moly Intact GP | 82 |

=== Moto3 ===
Riders' Championship standings

| | Pos. | Rider | Points |
|---|---|---|---|
| | 1 | (Spain) Albert Arenas | 106 |
| | 2 | (Japan) Ai Ogura | 101 |
| | 3 | (United Kingdom) John McPhee | 92 |
| 2 | 4 | (Japan) Tatsuki Suzuki | 75 |
| | 5 | (Italy) Tony Arbolino | 70 |

Constructors' Championship standings

| | Pos. | Constructor | Points |
|---|---|---|---|
| 1 | 1 | (Japan) Honda | 155 |
| 1 | 2 | (Austria) KTM | 142 |
| | 3 | (Sweden) Husqvarna | 25 |

Teams' Championship standings

| | Pos. | Team | Points |
|---|---|---|---|
| | 1 | (Spain) Pull&Bear Aspar Team Moto3 | 128 |
| 4 | 2 | (Italy) Kömmerling Gresini Moto3 | 102 |
| 1 | 3 | (Italy) Sic58 Squadra Corse | 101 |
| 1 | 4 | (Japan) Honda Team Asia | 101 |
| | 5 | (Luxembourg) Leopard Racing | 94 |

=== MotoE ===
| | Pos. | Rider | Points |
|---|---|---|---|
| | 1 | (Switzerland) Dominique Aegerter | 57 |
| 4 | 2 | (Italy) Matteo Ferrari | 45 |
| 1 | 3 | (Spain) Jordi Torres | 43 |
| | 4 | (Italy) Mattia Casadei | 38 |
| 4 | 5 | (Belgium) Xavier Siméon | 35 |

== Notes ==
| Previous race: 2020 Styrian Grand Prix | FIM Grand Prix World Championship; 2020 season | Next race: 2020 Emilia Romagna Grand Prix |
| Previous race: 2019 San Marino Grand Prix | San Marino and Rimini Riviera motorcycle Grand Prix | Next race: 2021 San Marino Grand Prix |
