= 2020 Emilia Romagna and Rimini Riviera motorcycle Grand Prix =

(Emilia-Romagna) 2020 Emilia Romagna and Rimini Riviera Grand Prix
Race details
- Race 8 of 15 races in the 2020 Grand Prix motorcycle racing season
- Date: 20 September 2020
- Official name: Gran Premio Tissot dell'Emilia Romagna e della Riviera di Rimini
- Location: Misano World Circuit Marco Simoncelli; Misano Adriatico, Province of Rimini, Italy
- Course: Permanent racing facility; 4.226 km (2.626 mi)

MotoGP
Pole position
| Rider | (Spain) Maverick Viñales | Yamaha |
| Time | 1:31.077 | |
Fastest lap
| Rider | (Italy) Francesco Bagnaia | Ducati |
| Time | 1:32.319 on lap 5 | |
Podium
| First | (Spain) Maverick Viñales | Yamaha |
| Second | (Spain) Joan Mir | Suzuki |
| Third | (Spain) Pol Espargaró | KTM |

Moto2
Pole position
| Rider | (Italy) Luca Marini | Kalex |
| Time | 1:35.271 | |
Fastest lap
| Rider | (United Kingdom) Sam Lowes | Kalex |
| Time | 1:36.195 pn lap 7 | |
Podium
| First | (Italy) Enea Bastianini | Kalex |
| Second | (Italy) Marco Bezzecchi | Kalex |
| Third | (United Kingdom) Sam Lowes | Kalex |

Moto3
Pole position
| Rider | (Spain) Raúl Fernández | KTM |
| Time | 1:41.705 | |
Fastest lap
| Rider | (Argentina) Gabriel Rodrigo | Honda |
| Time | 1:41.988 on lap 3 | |
Podium
| First | (Italy) Romano Fenati | Husqvarna |
| Second | (Italy) Celestino Vietti | KTM |
| Third | (Japan) Ai Ogura | Honda |

MotoE Race 1
Pole position
| Rider | (Spain) Jordi Torres | Energica |
| Time | 1:43.154 | |
Fastest lap
| Rider | (San Marino) Alex de Angelis | Energica |
| Time | 1:43.052 on lap 2 | |
Podium
| First | (Switzerland) Dominique Aegerter | Energica |
| Second | (Spain) Jordi Torres | Energica |
| Third | (Italy) Matteo Ferrari | Energica |

MotoE Race 2
Pole position
| Rider | (Switzerland) Dominique Aegerter | Energica |
| Time | Winner of race 1 (Note: Statistic not officially recorded for the rider) | |
Fastest lap
| Rider | (Spain) Jordi Torres | Energica |
| Time | 1:43.174 on lap 2 | |
Podium
| First | (Italy) Matteo Ferrari | Energica |
| Second | (Italy) Mattia Casadei | Energica |
| Third | (Spain) Jordi Torres | Energica |

The 2020 Emilia Romagna and Rimini Riviera motorcycle Grand Prix (officially known as the Gran Premio Tissot dell'Emilia Romagna e della Riviera di Rimini) was the eighth round of the 2020 Grand Prix motorcycle racing season, the seventh round of the 2020 MotoGP World Championship and the fourth round of the 2020 MotoE World Cup. It was held at the Misano World Circuit Marco Simoncelli in Misano Adriatico on 20 September 2020.

== Background ==
=== Impact of the COVID-19 pandemic ===
The opening rounds of the 2020 championship were heavily affected by the COVID-19 pandemic. Several Grands Prix were cancelled or postponed after the aborted opening round in Qatar, prompting the Fédération Internationale de Motocyclisme to draft a new calendar. However, the San Marino and Rimini Riviera Grand Prix was not impacted by this change and kept its original date.

Organisers of the race signed a contract with Dorna Sports, the sport's commercial rights holder, to host a second round at the circuit on 20 September (a week after the first race) to be known as the "Emilia Romagna and Rimini Riviera Grand Prix". The race was named for Emilia-Romagna, the region of Italy that the Misano World Circuit Marco Simoncelli is located in. The race was also the third time in the sport's history that the same venue and circuit layout hosted back-to-back World Championship races.

=== MotoGP Championship standings before the race ===
After the seventh round at the 2020 San Marino and Rimini Riviera Grand Prix, Andrea Dovizioso on 76 points, lead the championship by 6 points over Fabio Quartararo with Jack Miller a further 12 points behind.

In the Teams' Championship, Petronas Yamaha SRT with 127 points, lead the championship from Monster Energy Yamaha with 116. Ducati Team sat 15 points behind the factory Yamaha in third, and one point ahead of fourth-placed Team Suzuki Ecstar with 100 points, while Pramac Racing sat 5th on 97 points.

=== MotoGP Entrants ===
- Stefan Bradl replaced Marc Márquez from the Czech Republic round onwards while he recovered from injuries sustained in his opening round crash.

== Free practice ==
=== Combined Free Practice 1-2-3 ===
The top ten riders (written in bold) qualified in Q2.

| Pos. | No. | Bikers | Constructor | Free practice times | | |
| Pos. | No. | Bikers | Constructor | FP1 | FP2 | FP3 |
|---|---|---|---|---|---|---|
| 1 | 63 | (Italy) **Francesco Bagnaia** | **Ducati** | 1:32.410 | 1:32.138 | **1:31.127** |
| 2 | 12 | (Spain) **Maverick Viñales** | **Yamaha** | 1:32.589 | 1:31.669 | **1:31.185** |
| 3 | 20 | (France) **Fabio Quartararo** | **Yamaha** | 1:31.721 | 1:31.644 | **1:31.359** |
| 4 | 21 | (Italy) **Franco Morbidelli** | **Yamaha** | 1:31.811 | 1:32.307 | **1:31.429** |
| 5 | 36 | (Spain) **Joan Mir** | **Suzuki** | 1:31.926 | 1:32.126 | **1:31.626** |
| 6 | 33 | (South Africa) **Brad Binder** | **KTM** | 1:32.611 | **1:31.628** | 1:31.860 |
| 7 | 30 | (Japan) **Takaaki Nakagami** | **Honda** | 1:32.102 | **1:31.630** | 1:31.753 |
| 8 | 46 | (Italy) **Valentino Rossi** | **Yamaha** | 1:32.832 | 1:32.263 | **1:31.680** |
| 9 | 44 | (Spain) **Pol Espargaró** | **KTM** | 1:31.841 | **1:31.699** | 1:31.962 |
| 10 | 9 | (Italy) **Danilo Petrucci** | **Ducati** | 1:32.435 | 1:31.973 | **1:31.701** |
| 11 | 43 | (Australia) Jack Miller | Ducati | 1:32.627 | 1:32.279 | **1:31.760** |
| 12 | 5 | (France) Johann Zarco | Ducati | 1:32.170 | 1:32.072 | **1:31.826** |
| 13 | 41 | (Spain) Aleix Espargaró | Aprilia | 1:32.185 | 1:32.339 | **1:31.890** |
| 14 | 4 | (Italy) Andrea Dovizioso | Ducati | 1:32.152 | 1:32.692 | **1:31.894** |
| 15 | 88 | (Portugal) Miguel Oliveira | KTM | **1:31.965** | 1:32.032 | 1:32.260 |
| 16 | 27 | (Spain) Iker Lecuona | KTM | 1:33.183 | 1:32.238 | **1:32.229** |
| 17 | 42 | (Spain) Álex Rins | Suzuki | 1:32.634 | 1:32.407 | **1:32.292** |
| 18 | 73 | (Spain) Álex Márquez | Honda | 1:32.437 | **1:32.369** | 1:32.378 |
| 19 | 53 | (Spain) Tito Rabat | Ducati | 1:33.496 | **1:32.788** | 1:33.048 |
| 20 | 38 | (United Kingdom) Bradley Smith | Aprilia | 1:33.101 | **1:32.916** | 1:33.021 |
| 21 | 6 | (Germany) Stefan Bradl | Honda | **1:33.384** | No time | No time |
OFFICIAL MOTOGP COMBINED FREE PRACTICE TIMES REPORT

Fastest session lap

Personal Best lap

=== Free Practice 4 ===
The first three positions of the session are as follows.

| Pos. | No. | Rider | Constructor | FP4 Time |
|---|---|---|---|---|
| 1 | 63 | (Italy) Francesco Bagnaia | Ducati | 1:32.005 |
| 2 | 36 | (Spain) Joan Mir | Suzuki | 1:32.103 |
| 3 | 12 | (Spain) Maverick Viñales | Yamaha | 1:32.124 |
OFFICIAL MOTOGP FREE PRACTICE 4 REPORT

== Qualifying ==
=== MotoGP ===
| Pos. | No. | Rider | Constructor | Qualifying times | | Final grid |
| Pos. | No. | Rider | Constructor | Q1 | Q2 | Final grid |
|---|---|---|---|---|---|---|
| 1 | 12 | (Spain) Maverick Viñales | Yamaha | Qualified in Q2 | 1:31.077 | 1 |
| 2 | 43 | (Australia) Jack Miller | Ducati | 1:31.559 | 1:31.153 | 2 |
| 3 | 20 | (France) Fabio Quartararo | Yamaha | Qualified in Q2 | 1:31.222 | 3 |
| 4 | 44 | (Spain) Pol Espargaró | KTM | Qualified in Q2 | 1:31.308 | 4 |
| 5 | 63 | (Italy) Francesco Bagnaia | Ducati | Qualified in Q2 | 1:31.313 | 5 |
| 6 | 33 | (South Africa) Brad Binder | KTM | Qualified in Q2 | 1:31.389 | 6 |
| 7 | 46 | (Italy) Valentino Rossi | Yamaha | Qualified in Q2 | 1:31.436 | 7 |
| 8 | 21 | (Italy) Franco Morbidelli | Yamaha | Qualified in Q2 | 1:31.566 | 8 |
| 9 | 9 | (Italy) Danilo Petrucci | Ducati | Qualified in Q2 | 1:31.574 | 9 |
| 10 | 4 | (Italy) Andrea Dovizioso | Ducati | 1:31.612 | 1:31.581 | 10 |
| 11 | 36 | (Spain) Joan Mir | Suzuki | Qualified in Q2 | 1:31.617 | 11 |
| 12 | 30 | (Japan) Takaaki Nakagami | Honda | Qualified in Q2 | 1:32.284 | 12 |
| 13 | 27 | (Spain) Iker Lecuona | KTM | 1:31.715 | N/A | 13 |
| 14 | 5 | (France) Johann Zarco | Ducati | 1:31.764 | N/A | 14 |
| 15 | 88 | (Portugal) Miguel Oliveira | KTM | 1:31.841 | N/A | 15 |
| 16 | 41 | (Spain) Aleix Espargaró | Aprilia | 1:31.912 | N/A | 16 |
| 17 | 73 | (Spain) Álex Márquez | Honda | 1:32.198 | N/A | 17 |
| 18 | 42 | (Spain) Álex Rins | Suzuki | 1:32.275 | N/A | 18 |
| 19 | 38 | (United Kingdom) Bradley Smith | Aprilia | 1:32.486 | N/A | 19 |
| 20 | 53 | (Spain) Tito Rabat | Ducati | 1:32.850 | N/A | 20 |
| | 6 | (Germany) Stefan Bradl | Honda | Did not participate | N/A | |
OFFICIAL MOTOGP QUALIFYING Nr. 1 REPORT
OFFICIAL MOTOGP QUALIFYING Nr. 2 REPORT

== Race ==
=== MotoGP ===
| Pos. | No. | Rider | Team | Manufacturer | Laps | Time/Retired | Grid | Points |
|---|---|---|---|---|---|---|---|---|
| 1 | 12 | (Spain) Maverick Viñales | Monster Energy Yamaha MotoGP | Yamaha | 27 | 41:55.846 | 1 | 25 |
| 2 | 36 | (Spain) Joan Mir | Team Suzuki Ecstar | Suzuki | 27 | +2.425 | 11 | 20 |
| 3 | 44 | (Spain) Pol Espargaró | Red Bull KTM Factory Racing | KTM | 27 | +4.528 | 4 | 16 |
| 4 | 20 | (France) Fabio Quartararo | Petronas Yamaha SRT | Yamaha | 27 | +6.419 (Note: 3-second penalty.) | 3 | 13 |
| 5 | 88 | (Portugal) Miguel Oliveira | Red Bull KTM Tech3 | KTM | 27 | +7.368 | 15 | 11 |
| 6 | 30 | (Japan) Takaaki Nakagami | LCR Honda Idemitsu | Honda | 27 | +11.139 | 12 | 10 |
| 7 | 73 | (Spain) Álex Márquez | Repsol Honda Team | Honda | 27 | +11.929 | 17 | 9 |
| 8 | 4 | (Italy) Andrea Dovizioso | Ducati Team | Ducati | 27 | +13.113 | 10 | 8 |
| 9 | 21 | (Italy) Franco Morbidelli | Petronas Yamaha SRT | Yamaha | 27 | +15.880 | 8 | 7 |
| 10 | 9 | (Italy) Danilo Petrucci | Ducati Team | Ducati | 27 | +17.682 | 9 | 6 |
| 11 | 5 | (France) Johann Zarco | Esponsorama Racing | Ducati | 27 | +23.144 | 14 | 5 |
| 12 | 42 | (Spain) Álex Rins | Team Suzuki Ecstar | Suzuki | 27 | +24.962 | 18 | 4 |
| 13 | 38 | (United Kingdom) Bradley Smith | Aprilia Racing Team Gresini | Aprilia | 27 | +30.008 | 19 | 3 |
| Ret | 27 | (Spain) Iker Lecuona | Red Bull KTM Tech3 | KTM | 24 | Accident | 13 | |
| Ret | 63 | (Italy) Francesco Bagnaia | Pramac Racing | Ducati | 20 | Accident | 5 | |
| Ret | 46 | (Italy) Valentino Rossi | Monster Energy Yamaha MotoGP | Yamaha | 15 | Accident Damage | 7 | |
| Ret | 53 | (Spain) Tito Rabat | Esponsorama Racing | Ducati | 12 | Accident | 20 | |
| Ret | 43 | (Australia) Jack Miller | Pramac Racing | Ducati | 7 | Power Loss | 2 | |
| Ret | 33 | (South Africa) Brad Binder | Red Bull KTM Factory Racing | KTM | 3 | Accident | 6 | |
| Ret | 41 | (Spain) Aleix Espargaró | Aprilia Racing Team Gresini | Aprilia | 0 | Accident Damage | 16 | |
| DNS | 6 | (Germany) Stefan Bradl | Repsol Honda Team | Honda | | Did not start | | |
Fastest lap: (Italy) Francesco Bagnaia (Ducati) – 1:32.319 (lap 5)
Sources:

- Stefan Bradl withdrew from the event due to arm pump.

=== Moto2 ===
The race, scheduled to be run for 25 laps, was red-flagged after 6 full laps due to wet track conditions. The race was later restarted over 10 laps with the starting grid determined by the classification of the first part.

| Pos. | No. | Rider | Manufacturer | Laps | Time/Retired | Grid | Points |
|---|---|---|---|---|---|---|---|
| 1 | 33 | (Italy) Enea Bastianini | Kalex | 10 | 16:11.977 | 5 | 25 |
| 2 | 72 | (Italy) Marco Bezzecchi | Kalex | 10 | +0.720 | 2 | 20 |
| 3 | 22 | (United Kingdom) Sam Lowes | Kalex | 10 | +1.124 | 4 | 16 |
| 4 | 10 | (Italy) Luca Marini | Kalex | 10 | +2.310 | 1 | 13 |
| 5 | 23 | (Germany) Marcel Schrötter | Kalex | 10 | +4.132 | 11 | 11 |
| 6 | 96 | (United Kingdom) Jake Dixon | Kalex | 10 | +7.201 | 7 | 10 |
| 7 | 9 | (Spain) Jorge Navarro | Speed Up | 10 | +7.558 | 9 | 9 |
| 8 | 21 | (Italy) Fabio Di Giannantonio | Speed Up | 10 | +7.704 | 8 | 8 |
| 9 | 12 | (Switzerland) Thomas Lüthi | Kalex | 10 | +7.762 | 16 | 7 |
| 10 | 40 | (Spain) Héctor Garzó | Kalex | 10 | +8.249 | 15 | 6 |
| 11 (Note: 1-position penalty for exceeding track limits on the last lap.) | 11 | (Italy) Nicolò Bulega | Kalex | 10 | +8.141 | 10 | 5 |
| 12 | 24 | (Italy) Simone Corsi | MV Agusta | 10 | +8.663 | 24 | 4 |
| 13 | 44 | (Spain) Arón Canet | Speed Up | 10 | +9.189 | 6 | 3 |
| 14 | 19 | (Italy) Lorenzo Dalla Porta | Kalex | 10 | +12.538 | 17 | 2 |
| 15 | 62 | (Italy) Stefano Manzi | MV Agusta | 10 | +12.744 | 21 | 1 |
| 16 | 54 | (Italy) Mattia Pasini | Kalex | 10 | +12.935 | 14 | |
| 17 | 42 | (Spain) Marcos Ramírez | Kalex | 10 | +13.227 | 20 | |
| 18 | 37 | (Spain) Augusto Fernández | Kalex | 10 | +13.779 | 12 | |
| 19 | 55 | (Malaysia) Hafizh Syahrin | Speed Up | 10 | +14.525 | 25 | |
| 20 | 57 | (Spain) Edgar Pons | Kalex | 10 | +15.028 | 22 | |
| 21 | 35 | (Thailand) Somkiat Chantra | Kalex | 10 | +15.511 | 26 | |
| 22 | 64 | (Netherlands) Bo Bendsneyder | NTS | 10 | +18.160 | 23 | |
| 23 | 45 | (Japan) Tetsuta Nagashima | Kalex | 10 | +18.079 | 13 | |
| 24 | 27 | (Indonesia) Andi Farid Izdihar | Kalex | 10 | +21.265 | 28 | |
| 25 | 7 | (Italy) Lorenzo Baldassarri | Kalex | 10 | +25.587 | 19 | |
| Ret | 74 | (Poland) Piotr Biesiekirski | NTS | 8 | Accident | 29 | |
| Ret | 97 | (Spain) Xavi Vierge | Kalex | 5 | Collision | 3 | |
| Ret | 16 | (United States) Joe Roberts | Kalex | 0 | Did not restart | 18 | |
| Ret | 99 | (Malaysia) Kasma Daniel | Kalex | 0 | Did not restart | 27 | |
OFFICIAL MOTO2 RACE REPORT

=== Moto3 ===
| Pos. | No. | Rider | Manufacturer | Laps | Time/Retired | Grid | Points |
|---|---|---|---|---|---|---|---|
| 1 | 55 | (Italy) Romano Fenati | Husqvarna | 23 | 39:30.124 | 6 | 25 |
| 2 | 13 | (Italy) Celestino Vietti | KTM | 23 | +0.036 | 5 | 20 |
| 3 | 79 | (Japan) Ai Ogura | Honda | 23 | +0.121 | 11 | 16 |
| 4 | 75 | (Spain) Albert Arenas | KTM | 23 | +0.199 | 4 | 13 |
| 5 | 5 | (Spain) Jaume Masiá | Honda | 23 | +0.280 | 8 | 11 |
| 6 | 25 | (Spain) Raúl Fernández | KTM | 23 | +0.439 | 1 | 10 |
| 7 | 53 | (Turkey) Deniz Öncü | KTM | 23 | +0.678 | 12 | 9 |
| 8 | 16 | (Italy) Andrea Migno | KTM | 23 | +0.791 | 3 | 8 |
| 9 | 27 | (Japan) Kaito Toba | KTM | 23 | +0.939 | 7 | 7 |
| 10 | 17 | (United Kingdom) John McPhee | Honda | 23 | +1.125 | 19 | 6 |
| 11 | 14 | (Italy) Tony Arbolino | Honda | 23 | +1.452 | 2 | 5 |
| 12 | 2 | (Argentina) Gabriel Rodrigo | Honda | 23 | +1.687 | 18 | 4 |
| 13 | 52 | (Spain) Jeremy Alcoba | Honda | 23 | +4.331 | 9 | 3 |
| 14 | 71 | (Japan) Ayumu Sasaki | KTM | 23 | +5.925 | 15 | 2 |
| 15 | 82 | (Italy) Stefano Nepa | KTM | 23 | +6.165 | 14 | 1 |
| 16 | 12 | (Czech Republic) Filip Salač | Honda | 23 | +6.249 | 13 | |
| 17 | 11 | (Spain) Sergio García | Honda | 23 | +7.167 | 17 | |
| 18 | 23 | (Italy) Niccolò Antonelli | Honda | 23 | +12.714 | 21 | |
| 19 | 99 | (Spain) Carlos Tatay | KTM | 23 | +18.045 | 28 | |
| 20 | 6 | (Japan) Ryusei Yamanaka | Honda | 23 | +20.184 | 24 | |
| 21 | 54 | (Italy) Riccardo Rossi | KTM | 23 | +20.498 | 23 | |
| 22 | 70 | (Belgium) Barry Baltus | KTM | 23 | +20.291 | 16 | |
| 23 | 50 | (Switzerland) Jason Dupasquier | KTM | 23 | +20.555 | 29 | |
| 24 | 89 | (Malaysia) Khairul Idham Pawi | Honda | 23 | +24.967 | 25 | |
| 25 | 92 | (Japan) Yuki Kunii | Honda | 23 | +25.264 | 26 | |
| 26 | 9 | (Italy) Davide Pizzoli | KTM | 23 | +27.159 | 30 | |
| 27 | 73 | (Austria) Maximilian Kofler | KTM | 23 | +27.848 | 27 | |
| Ret | 40 | (South Africa) Darryn Binder | KTM | 18 | Accident | 20 | |
| Ret | 7 | (Italy) Dennis Foggia | Honda | 10 | Accident | 10 | |
| Ret | 21 | (Spain) Alonso López | Husqvarna | 8 | Accident | 22 | |
| DNS | 24 | (Japan) Tatsuki Suzuki | Honda | | Did not start | | |
OFFICIAL MOTO3 RACE REPORT

- Tatsuki Suzuki suffered a broken left wrist in a crash during qualifying and withdrew from the event.

=== MotoE ===
==== Race 1 ====
| Pos. | No. | Rider | Laps | Time/Retired | Grid | Points |
|---|---|---|---|---|---|---|
| 1 | 77 | (Switzerland) Dominique Aegerter | 7 | 12:11.346 | 3 | 25 |
| 2 | 40 | (Spain) Jordi Torres | 7 | +0.103 | 1 | 20 |
| 3 | 11 | (Italy) Matteo Ferrari | 7 | +0.075 | 2 | 16 |
| 4 | 27 | (Italy) Mattia Casadei | 7 | +2.531 | 7 | 13 |
| 5 | 70 | (Italy) Tommaso Marcon | 7 | +6.578 | 12 | 11 |
| 6 | 7 | (Italy) Niccolò Canepa | 7 | +7.695 | 13 | 10 |
| 7 | 55 | (Spain) Alejandro Medina | 7 | +8.277 | 10 | 9 |
| 8 | 16 | (Australia) Joshua Hook | 7 | +8.336 | 15 | 8 |
| 9 | 18 | (Andorra) Xavi Cardelús | 7 | +8.553 | 14 | 7 |
| 10 | 61 | (Italy) Alessandro Zaccone | 7 | +8.640 | 16 | 6 |
| 11 | 6 | (Spain) María Herrera | 7 | +11.566 | 17 | 5 |
| 12 | 84 | (Czech Republic) Jakub Kornfeil | 7 | +16.973 | 18 | 4 |
| 13 | 66 | (Finland) Niki Tuuli | 7 | +17.538 | 9 | 3 |
| Ret | 15 | (San Marino) Alex de Angelis | 3 | Accident | 11 | |
| Ret | 10 | (Belgium) Xavier Siméon | 2 | Collision | 5 | |
| Ret | 51 | (Brazil) Eric Granado | 2 | Collision | 4 | |
| Ret | 35 | (Germany) Lukas Tulovic | 0 | Accident | 6 | |
| Ret | 63 | (France) Mike Di Meglio | 0 | Accident | 8 | |
OFFICIAL MOTOE RACE 1 REPORT

- All bikes manufactured by Energica.

==== Race 2 ====
| Pos. | No. | Rider | Laps | Time/Retired | Grid | Points |
|---|---|---|---|---|---|---|
| 1 | 11 | (Italy) Matteo Ferrari | 7 | 12:11.053 | 3 | 25 |
| 2 | 27 | (Italy) Mattia Casadei | 7 | +0.996 | 4 | 20 |
| 3 | 40 | (Spain) Jordi Torres | 7 | +1.098 | 2 | 16 |
| 4 | 7 | (Italy) Niccolò Canepa | 7 | +3.907 | 6 | 13 |
| 5 | 61 | (Italy) Alessandro Zaccone | 7 | +4.619 | 10 | 11 |
| 6 | 63 | (France) Mike Di Meglio | 7 | +6.046 | 17 | 10 |
| 7 | 51 | (Brazil) Eric Granado | 7 | +6.097 | 14 | 9 |
| 8 | 15 | (San Marino) Alex de Angelis | 7 | +6.775 | 18 | 8 |
| 9 | 55 | (Spain) Alejandro Medina | 7 | +6.672 | 7 | 7 |
| 10 | 18 | (Andorra) Xavi Cardelús | 7 | +7.042 | 9 | 6 |
| 11 | 6 | (Spain) María Herrera | 7 | +7.868 | 11 | 5 |
| 12 | 66 | (Finland) Niki Tuuli | 7 | +11.514 | 13 | 4 |
| 13 | 84 | (Czech Republic) Jakub Kornfeil | 7 | +12.652 | 12 | 3 |
| 14 | 10 | (Belgium) Xavier Siméon | 7 | +15.533 | 15 | 2 |
| 15 | 35 | (Germany) Lukas Tulovic | 7 | +27.210 | 16 | 1 |
| 16 | 77 | (Switzerland) Dominique Aegerter | 7 | +38.363 | 1 | |
| Ret | 16 | (Australia) Joshua Hook | 5 | Accident | 8 | |
| Ret | 70 | (Italy) Tommaso Marcon | 1 | Collision | 5 | |
OFFICIAL MOTOE RACE 2 REPORT

- All bikes manufactured by Energica.

== Championship standings after the race ==
Below are the standings for the top five riders, constructors, and teams after the round.

=== MotoGP ===
Riders' Championship standings

| | Pos. | Rider | Points |
|---|---|---|---|
| | 1 | (Italy) Andrea Dovizioso | 84 |
| | 2 | (France) Fabio Quartararo | 83 |
| 2 | 3 | (Spain) Maverick Viñales | 83 |
| | 4 | (Spain) Joan Mir | 80 |
| 2 | 5 | (Italy) Franco Morbidelli | 64 |

Constructors' Championship standings

| Pos. | Constructor | Points |
|---|---|---|
| 1 | (Italy) Ducati | 115 |
| 2 | (Austria) KTM | 104 |
| 3 | (Japan) Suzuki | 93 |
| 4 | (Japan) Yamaha | 88 (Note: Yamaha scored 138 points as a manufacturer, but were deducted 50 points after failing to respect MSMA technical changes protocols.) |
| 5 | (Japan) Honda | 63 |

Teams' Championship standings

| | Pos. | Team | Points |
|---|---|---|---|
| 1 | 1 | (Japan) Team Suzuki Ecstar | 124 |
| 2 | 2 | (Japan) Monster Energy Yamaha MotoGP | 121 (Note: Monster Energy Yamaha MotoGP riders scored 141 points, but the team was deducted 20 points after failing to respect MSMA technical changes protocols.) |
| 2 | 3 | (Italy) Ducati Team | 115 |
| 1 | 4 | (Austria) Red Bull KTM Factory Racing | 110 |
| 1 | 5 | (Malaysia) Petronas Yamaha SRT | 110 (Note: Petronas Yamaha SRT riders scored 147 points, but the team was deducted 37 points after failing to respect MSMA technical changes protocols.) |

=== Moto2 ===
Riders' Championship standings

| | Pos. | Rider | Points |
|---|---|---|---|
| | 1 | (Italy) Luca Marini | 125 |
| | 2 | (Italy) Enea Bastianini | 120 |
| | 3 | (Italy) Marco Bezzecchi | 105 |
| 2 | 4 | (United Kingdom) Sam Lowes | 83 |
| 1 | 5 | (Spain) Jorge Martín | 79 |

Constructors' Championship standings

| Pos. | Constructor | Points |
|---|---|---|
| 1 | (Germany) Kalex | 200 |
| 2 | (Italy) Speed Up | 66 |
| 3 | (Italy) MV Agusta | 21 |
| 4 | (Japan) NTS | 9 |

Teams' Championship standings

| | Pos. | Team | Points |
|---|---|---|---|
| | 1 | (Italy) Sky Racing Team VR46 | 230 |
| | 2 | (Finland) Red Bull KTM Ajo | 147 |
| 1 | 3 | (Italy) Italtrans Racing Team | 125 |
| 1 | 4 | (Belgium) EG 0,0 Marc VDS | 119 |
| | 5 | (Germany) Liqui Moly Intact GP | 100 |

=== Moto3 ===
Riders' Championship standings

| | Pos. | Rider | Points |
|---|---|---|---|
| | 1 | (Spain) Albert Arenas | 119 |
| | 2 | (Japan) Ai Ogura | 117 |
| | 3 | (United Kingdom) John McPhee | 98 |
| 2 | 4 | (Italy) Celestino Vietti | 86 |
| 1 | 5 | (Japan) Tatsuki Suzuki | 75 |

Constructors' Championship standings

| | Pos. | Constructor | Points |
|---|---|---|---|
| 1 | 1 | (Japan) Honda | 171 |
| 1 | 2 | (Austria) KTM | 162 |
| | 3 | (Sweden) Husqvarna | 50 |

Teams' Championship standings

| | Pos. | Team | Points |
|---|---|---|---|
| | 1 | (Spain) Gaviota Aspar Team Moto3 | 142 |
| 4 | 2 | (Italy) Sky Racing Team VR46 | 122 |
| 1 | 3 | (Japan) Honda Team Asia | 117 |
| 2 | 4 | (Italy) Kömmerling Gresini Moto3 | 109 |
| | 5 | (Luxembourg) Leopard Racing | 105 |

=== MotoE ===
| | Pos. | Rider | Points |
|---|---|---|---|
| 1 | 1 | (Italy) Matteo Ferrari | 86 |
| 1 | 2 | (Switzerland) Dominique Aegerter | 82 |
| | 3 | (Spain) Jordi Torres | 79 |
| | 4 | (Italy) Mattia Casadei | 71 |
| 1 | 5 | (Brazil) Eric Granado | 43 |

== Notes ==
| Previous race: 2020 San Marino Grand Prix | FIM Grand Prix World Championship; 2020 season | Next race: 2020 Catalan Grand Prix |
| Previous race: None | Emilia Romagna and Rimini Riviera motorcycle Grand Prix | Next race: 2021 Emilia Romagna Grand Prix |
