= 2019 San Marino and Rimini Riviera motorcycle Grand Prix =

2019 San Marino and Rimini Riviera Grand Prix
Race details
- Race 13 of 19 races in the 2019 Grand Prix motorcycle racing season
- Date: 15 September 2019
- Official name: Gran Premio Octo di San Marino e della Riviera di Rimini
- Location: Misano World Circuit Marco Simoncelli, Misano Adriatico, Italy
- Course: Permanent racing facility; 4.226 km (2.626 mi)

MotoGP
Pole position
| Rider | (Spain) Maverick Viñales | Yamaha |
| Time | 1:32.265 | |
Fastest lap
| Rider | (Spain) Marc Márquez | Honda |
| Time | 1:33.355 on lap 5 | |
Podium
| First | (Spain) Marc Márquez | Honda |
| Second | (France) Fabio Quartararo | Yamaha |
| Third | (Spain) Maverick Viñales | Yamaha |

Moto2
Pole position
| Rider | (Italy) Fabio Di Giannantonio | Speed Up |
| Time | 1:37.481 | |
Fastest lap
| Rider | (Spain) Augusto Fernández | Kalex |
| Time | 1:38.175 on lap 4 | |
Podium
| First | (Spain) Augusto Fernández | Kalex |
| Second | (Italy) Fabio Di Giannantonio | Speed Up |
| Third | (Spain) Álex Márquez | Kalex |

Moto3
Pole position
| Rider | (Japan) Tatsuki Suzuki | Honda |
| Time | 1:42.844 | |
Fastest lap
| Rider | (Italy) Andrea Migno | KTM |
| Time | 1:43.078 on lap 9 | |
Podium
| First | (Japan) Tatsuki Suzuki | Honda |
| Second | (United Kingdom) John McPhee | Honda |
| Third | (Italy) Tony Arbolino | Honda |

MotoE Race 1
Pole position
| Rider | (San Marino) Alex de Angelis | Energica |
| Time | 1:44.660 | |
Fastest lap
| Rider | (Italy) Matteo Ferrari | Energica |
| Time | 1:44.461 on lap 4 | |
Podium
| First | (Italy) Matteo Ferrari | Energica |
| Second | (Spain) Héctor Garzó | Energica |
| Third | (Belgium) Xavier Siméon | Energica |

MotoE Race 2
Pole position
| Rider | (San Marino) Alex de Angelis | Energica |
| Time | 1:44.660 | |
Fastest lap
| Rider | (Spain) Héctor Garzó | Energica |
| Time | 1:43.746 on lap 2 | |
Podium
| First | (Italy) Matteo Ferrari | Energica |
| Second | (Spain) Héctor Garzó | Energica |
| Third | (Italy) Mattia Casadei | Energica |

The 2019 San Marino and Rimini Riviera motorcycle Grand Prix was the thirteenth round of the 2019 MotoGP season. It was held at the Misano World Circuit Marco Simoncelli in Misano Adriatico on 15 September 2019.

== Classification ==
=== MotoGP ===
| Pos. | No. | Rider | Team | Manufacturer | Laps | Time/Retired | Grid | Points |
|---|---|---|---|---|---|---|---|---|
| 1 | 93 | (Spain) Marc Márquez | Repsol Honda Team | Honda | 27 | 42:25.163 | 5 | 25 |
| 2 | 20 | (France) Fabio Quartararo | Petronas Yamaha SRT | Yamaha | 27 | +0.903 | 3 | 20 |
| 3 | 12 | (Spain) Maverick Viñales | Monster Energy Yamaha MotoGP | Yamaha | 27 | +1.636 | 1 | 16 |
| 4 | 46 | (Italy) Valentino Rossi | Monster Energy Yamaha MotoGP | Yamaha | 27 | +12.660 | 7 | 13 |
| 5 | 21 | (Italy) Franco Morbidelli | Petronas Yamaha SRT | Yamaha | 27 | +12.774 | 4 | 11 |
| 6 | 4 | (Italy) Andrea Dovizioso | Ducati Team | Ducati | 27 | +13.744 | 6 | 10 |
| 7 | 44 | (Spain) Pol Espargaró | Red Bull KTM Factory Racing | KTM | 27 | +20.050 | 2 | 9 |
| 8 | 36 | (Spain) Joan Mir | Team Suzuki Ecstar | Suzuki | 27 | +22.512 | 9 | 8 |
| 9 | 43 | (Australia) Jack Miller | Pramac Racing | Ducati | 27 | +26.554 | 16 | 7 |
| 10 | 9 | (Italy) Danilo Petrucci | Ducati Team | Ducati | 27 | +31.456 | 17 | 6 |
| 11 | 5 | (France) Johann Zarco | Red Bull KTM Factory Racing | KTM | 27 | +32.388 | 11 (Note: 3-place grid penalty.) | 5 |
| 12 | 41 | (Spain) Aleix Espargaró | Aprilia Racing Team Gresini | Aprilia | 27 | +34.477 | 15 | 4 |
| 13 | 53 | (Spain) Tito Rabat | Reale Avintia Racing | Ducati | 27 | +35.325 | 22 | 3 |
| 14 | 99 | (Spain) Jorge Lorenzo | Repsol Honda Team | Honda | 27 | +47.247 | 18 | 2 |
| 15 | 55 | (Malaysia) Hafizh Syahrin | Red Bull KTM Tech3 | KTM | 27 | +1:02.280 | 20 | 1 |
| 16 | 88 | (Portugal) Miguel Oliveira | Red Bull KTM Tech3 | KTM | 27 | +1:07.831 | 19 | |
| 17 | 17 | (Czech Republic) Karel Abraham | Reale Avintia Racing | Ducati | 27 | +1:24.666 | 21 | |
| 18 | 30 | (Japan) Takaaki Nakagami | LCR Honda Idemitsu | Honda | 26 | +1 lap | 10 | |
| Ret | 35 | (United Kingdom) Cal Crutchlow | LCR Honda Castrol | Honda | 22 | Accident | 14 | |
| Ret | 51 | (Italy) Michele Pirro | Ducati Team | Ducati | 21 | Accident Damage | 12 | |
| Ret | 42 | (Spain) Álex Rins | Team Suzuki Ecstar | Suzuki | 15 | Accident | 8 | |
| Ret | 63 | (Italy) Francesco Bagnaia | Pramac Racing | Ducati | 11 | Accident | 13 | |
| DNS | 29 | (Italy) Andrea Iannone | Aprilia Racing Team Gresini | Aprilia | | Did not start | | |
Sources:

- Andrea Iannone withdrew from the event due to a shoulder injury.

=== Moto2 ===
| Pos. | No. | Rider | Manufacturer | Laps | Time/Retired | Grid | Points |
|---|---|---|---|---|---|---|---|
| 1 | 40 | (Spain) Augusto Fernández | Kalex | 25 | 41:12.535 | 3 | 25 |
| 2 | 21 | (Italy) Fabio Di Giannantonio | Speed Up | 25 | +0.186 | 1 | 20 |
| 3 | 73 | (Spain) Álex Márquez | Kalex | 25 | +1.283 | 2 | 16 |
| 4 | 12 | (Switzerland) Thomas Lüthi | Kalex | 25 | +2.733 | 7 | 13 |
| 5 | 22 | (United Kingdom) Sam Lowes | Kalex | 25 | +8.764 | 8 | 11 |
| 6 | 41 | (South Africa) Brad Binder | KTM | 25 | +8.952 | 16 | 10 |
| 7 | 9 | (Spain) Jorge Navarro | Speed Up | 25 | +9.928 | 15 | 9 |
| 8 | 97 | (Spain) Xavi Vierge | Kalex | 25 | +12.844 | 6 | 8 |
| 9 | 33 | (Italy) Enea Bastianini | Kalex | 25 | +13.916 | 10 | 7 |
| 10 | 7 | (Italy) Lorenzo Baldassarri | Kalex | 25 | +15.338 | 14 | 6 |
| 11 | 10 | (Italy) Luca Marini | Kalex | 25 | +17.881 | 12 | 5 |
| 12 | 88 | (Spain) Jorge Martín | KTM | 25 | +20.511 | 17 | 4 |
| 13 | 5 | (Italy) Andrea Locatelli | Kalex | 25 | +21.714 | 11 | 3 |
| 14 | 35 | (Thailand) Somkiat Chantra | Kalex | 25 | +28.673 | 19 | 2 |
| 15 | 62 | (Italy) Stefano Manzi | MV Agusta | 25 | +30.791 | 20 | 1 |
| 16 | 16 | (United States) Joe Roberts | KTM | 25 | +31.679 | 24 | |
| 17 | 64 | (Netherlands) Bo Bendsneyder | NTS | 25 | +32.104 | 23 | |
| 18 | 77 | (Switzerland) Dominique Aegerter | MV Agusta | 25 | +32.324 | 21 | |
| 19 | 24 | (Italy) Simone Corsi | NTS | 25 | +34.048 | 22 | |
| 20 | 96 | (United Kingdom) Jake Dixon | KTM | 25 | +45.708 | 25 | |
| 21 | 27 | (Spain) Iker Lecuona | KTM | 25 | +47.521 | 18 | |
| 22 | 3 | (Germany) Lukas Tulovic | KTM | 25 | +54.782 | 27 | |
| 23 | 65 | (Germany) Philipp Öttl | KTM | 25 | +57.945 | 26 | |
| 24 | 36 | (Indonesia) Andi Farid Izdihar | Kalex | 25 | +1:03.822 | 30 | |
| 25 | 18 | (Andorra) Xavi Cardelús | KTM | 25 | +1:07.021 (Note: 3-second penalty for exceeding track limits.) | 28 | |
| Ret | 45 | (Japan) Tetsuta Nagashima | Kalex | 13 | Accident | 5 | |
| Ret | 87 | (Australia) Remy Gardner | Kalex | 10 | Accident | 4 | |
| Ret | 11 | (Italy) Nicolò Bulega | Kalex | 10 | Accident | 13 | |
| Ret | 72 | (Italy) Marco Bezzecchi | KTM | 6 | Accident | 9 | |
| Ret | 47 | (Malaysia) Adam Norrodin | Kalex | 5 | Accident | 29 | |
| DNS | 23 | (Germany) Marcel Schrötter | Kalex | | Did not start | | |
| DNS | 54 | (Italy) Mattia Pasini | Kalex | | Did not start | | |
OFFICIAL MOTO2 REPORT

- Marcel Schrötter (broken clavicle) and Mattia Pasini (thoracic vertebrae) withdrew from the event due to injuries sustained in crashes during practice.

=== Moto3 ===
Can Öncü was replaced by Deniz Öncü after the first practice session due to injury.

| Pos. | No. | Rider | Manufacturer | Laps | Time/Retired | Grid | Points |
|---|---|---|---|---|---|---|---|
| 1 | 24 | (Japan) Tatsuki Suzuki | Honda | 23 | 40:00.034 | 1 | 25 |
| 2 | 17 | (United Kingdom) John McPhee | Honda | 23 | +0.112 | 14 | 20 |
| 3 | 14 | (Italy) Tony Arbolino | Honda | 23 | +0.201 | 3 | 16 |
| 4 | 5 | (Spain) Jaume Masiá | KTM | 23 | +0.708 | 4 | 13 |
| 5 | 7 | (Italy) Dennis Foggia | KTM | 23 | +3.232 | 13 | 11 |
| 6 | 19 | (Argentina) Gabriel Rodrigo | Honda | 23 | +3.431 | 16 | 10 |
| 7 | 42 | (Spain) Marcos Ramírez | Honda | 23 | +3.518 | 9 | 9 |
| 8 | 48 | (Italy) Lorenzo Dalla Porta | Honda | 23 | +3.740 | 7 | 8 |
| 9 | 12 | (Czech Republic) Filip Salač | KTM | 23 | +4.358 | 12 | 7 |
| 10 | 25 | (Spain) Raúl Fernández | KTM | 23 | +14.210 | 24 | 6 |
| 11 | 82 | (Italy) Stefano Nepa | KTM | 23 | +17.190 | 19 | 5 |
| 12 | 84 | (Czech Republic) Jakub Kornfeil | KTM | 23 | +17.217 | 15 | 4 |
| 13 | 16 | (Italy) Andrea Migno | KTM | 23 | +29.972 | 10 | 3 |
| 14 | 54 | (Italy) Riccardo Rossi | Honda | 23 | +32.133 | 20 | 2 |
| 15 | 20 | (San Marino) Elia Bartolini | KTM | 23 | +32.217 | 30 | 1 |
| 16 | 53 | (Turkey) Deniz Öncü | KTM | 23 | +51.058 | 23 | |
| Ret | 79 | (Japan) Ai Ogura | Honda | 22 | Accident | 11 | |
| Ret | 22 | (Japan) Kazuki Masaki | KTM | 18 | Accident | 17 | |
| Ret | 83 | (Brazil) Meikon Kawakami | KTM | 17 | Accident | 29 | |
| Ret | 40 | (South Africa) Darryn Binder | KTM | 8 | Accident Damage | 27 | |
| Ret | 44 | (Spain) Arón Canet | KTM | 5 | Fuel Pump | 2 | |
| Ret | 75 | (Spain) Albert Arenas | KTM | 3 | Accident | 8 | |
| Ret | 23 | (Italy) Niccolò Antonelli | Honda | 3 | Accident | 6 | |
| Ret | 13 | (Italy) Celestino Vietti | KTM | 3 | Accident | 5 | |
| Ret | 69 | (United Kingdom) Tom Booth-Amos | KTM | 3 | Accident | 28 | |
| Ret | 21 | (Spain) Alonso López | Honda | 2 | Accident | 21 | |
| Ret | 71 | (Japan) Ayumu Sasaki | Honda | 0 | Accident | 18 | |
| Ret | 27 | (Japan) Kaito Toba | Honda | 0 | Accident | 22 | |
| Ret | 11 | (Spain) Sergio García | Honda | 0 | Accident | 25 | |
| Ret | 76 | (Kazakhstan) Makar Yurchenko | KTM | 0 | Accident | 26 | |
| DNS | 55 | (Italy) Romano Fenati | Honda | | Did not start | | |
OFFICIAL MOTO3 REPORT

- Romano Fenati suffered a broken wrist in a crash during practice and withdrew from the event.

=== MotoE ===
==== Race 1 ====
| Pos. | No. | Rider | Laps | Time/Retired | Grid | Points |
|---|---|---|---|---|---|---|
| 1 | 11 | (Italy) Matteo Ferrari | 7 | 12:19.694 | 2 | 25 |
| 2 | 4 | (Spain) Héctor Garzó | 7 | +0.187 | 8 | 20 |
| 3 | 10 | (Belgium) Xavier Siméon | 7 | +0.590 | 3 | 16 |
| 4 | 2 | (Switzerland) Jesko Raffin | 7 | +3.111 | 4 | 13 |
| 5 | 7 | (Italy) Niccolò Canepa | 7 | +3.284 | 5 | 11 |
| 6 | 6 | (Spain) María Herrera | 7 | +6.516 | 6 | 10 |
| 7 | 32 | (Italy) Lorenzo Savadori | 7 | +6.883 | 11 | 9 |
| 8 | 18 | (Spain) Nicolás Terol | 7 | +7.276 | 9 | 8 |
| 9 | 15 | (Spain) Sete Gibernau | 7 | +14.576 | 18 | 7 |
| 10 | 16 | (Australia) Joshua Hook | 7 | +15.568 | 12 | 6 |
| 11 | 14 | (France) Randy de Puniet | 7 | +22.278 | 14 | 5 |
| 12 | 38 | (United Kingdom) Bradley Smith | 7 | +31.146 | 7 | 4 |
| 13 | 51 | (Brazil) Eric Granado | 7 | +1:10.405 | 16 | 3 |
| Ret | 5 | (San Marino) Alex de Angelis | 3 | Accident | 1 | |
| Ret | 27 | (Italy) Mattia Casadei | 1 | Accident | 10 | |
| Ret | 66 | (Finland) Niki Tuuli | 1 | Accident | 15 | |
| Ret | 78 | (France) Kenny Foray | 1 | Accident | 13 | |
| Ret | 63 | (France) Mike Di Meglio | 1 | Retired | 17 | |
OFFICIAL MOTOE RACE 1 REPORT

- All bikes manufactured by Energica.

==== Race 2 ====
| Pos. | No. | Rider | Laps | Time/Retired | Grid | Points |
|---|---|---|---|---|---|---|
| 1 | 11 | (Italy) Matteo Ferrari | 7 | 12:15.142 | 2 | 25 |
| 2 | 4 | (Spain) Héctor Garzó | 7 | +2.687 | 8 | 20 |
| 3 | 27 | (Italy) Mattia Casadei | 7 | +2.844 | 10 | 16 |
| 4 | 7 | (Italy) Niccolò Canepa | 7 | +2.899 | 5 | 13 |
| 5 | 6 | (Spain) María Herrera | 7 | +3.022 | 6 | 11 |
| 6 | 51 | (Brazil) Eric Granado | 7 | +5.448 | 15 | 10 |
| 7 | 2 | (Switzerland) Jesko Raffin | 7 | +5.740 | 4 | 9 |
| 8 | 38 | (United Kingdom) Bradley Smith | 7 | +7.013 | 7 | 8 |
| 9 | 18 | (Spain) Nicolás Terol | 7 | +8.072 | 9 | 7 |
| 10 | 63 | (France) Mike Di Meglio | 7 | +10.405 | 16 | 6 |
| 11 | 32 | (Italy) Lorenzo Savadori | 7 | +10.559 | 11 | 5 |
| 12 | 16 | (Australia) Joshua Hook | 7 | +11.312 | 12 | 4 |
| 13 | 14 | (France) Randy de Puniet | 7 | +24.129 | 14 | 3 |
| 14 | 78 | (France) Kenny Foray | 7 | +35.867 | 4 | 2 |
| Ret | 5 | (San Marino) Alex de Angelis | 4 | Accident | 1 | |
| Ret | 15 | (Spain) Sete Gibernau | 4 | Accident | 17 | |
| Ret | 10 | (Belgium) Xavier Siméon | 0 | Accident | 3 | |
| DNS | 66 | (Finland) Niki Tuuli | | Did not start | | |
OFFICIAL MOTOE RACE 2 REPORT

- Niki Tuuli suffered wrist and femur fractures in a crash during Race 1.
- All bikes manufactured by Energica.

== Championship standings after the race ==
=== MotoGP ===
| Pos. | Rider | Points |
|---|---|---|
| 1 | (Spain) Marc Márquez | 275 |
| 2 | (Italy) Andrea Dovizioso | 182 |
| 3 | (Italy) Danilo Petrucci | 151 |
| 4 | (Spain) Álex Rins | 149 |
| 5 | (Spain) Maverick Viñales | 134 |
| 6 | (Italy) Valentino Rossi | 129 |
| 7 | (France) Fabio Quartararo | 112 |
| 8 | (Australia) Jack Miller | 101 |
| 9 | (United Kingdom) Cal Crutchlow | 88 |
| 10 | (Italy) Franco Morbidelli | 80 |

=== Moto2 ===
| Pos. | Rider | Points |
|---|---|---|
| 1 | (Spain) Álex Márquez | 197 |
| 2 | (Spain) Augusto Fernández | 171 |
| 3 | (Switzerland) Thomas Lüthi | 159 |
| 4 | (Spain) Jorge Navarro | 155 |
| 5 | (South Africa) Brad Binder | 135 |
| 6 | (Italy) Lorenzo Baldassarri | 130 |
| 7 | (Germany) Marcel Schrötter | 116 |
| 8 | (Italy) Luca Marini | 113 |
| 9 | (Italy) Fabio Di Giannantonio | 89 |
| 10 | (Italy) Enea Bastianini | 81 |

=== Moto3 ===
| Pos. | Rider | Points |
|---|---|---|
| 1 | (Italy) Lorenzo Dalla Porta | 179 |
| 2 | (Spain) Arón Canet | 157 |
| 3 | (Italy) Tony Arbolino | 149 |
| 4 | (Spain) Marcos Ramírez | 123 |
| 5 | (Italy) Niccolò Antonelli | 118 |
| 6 | (United Kingdom) John McPhee | 113 |
| 7 | (Spain) Jaume Masiá | 96 |
| 8 | (Italy) Celestino Vietti | 88 |
| 9 | (Japan) Tatsuki Suzuki | 75 |
| 10 | (Czech Republic) Jakub Kornfeil | 71 |

=== MotoE ===
| Pos. | Rider | Points |
|---|---|---|
| 1 | (Italy) Matteo Ferrari | 72 |
| 2 | (Spain) Héctor Garzó | 53 |
| 3 | (United Kingdom) Bradley Smith | 48 |
| 4 | (France) Mike Di Meglio | 47 |
| 5 | (Belgium) Xavier Siméon | 45 |
| 6 | (Italy) Niccolò Canepa | 36 |
| 7 | (Switzerland) Jesko Raffin | 32 |
| 8 | (Finland) Niki Tuuli | 26 |
| 9 | (Italy) Mattia Casadei | 24 |
| 10 | (Spain) Sete Gibernau | 24 |

== Notes ==
| Previous race: 2019 British Grand Prix | FIM Grand Prix World Championship; 2019 season | Next race: 2019 Aragon Grand Prix |
| Previous race: 2018 San Marino Grand Prix | San Marino and Rimini Riviera motorcycle Grand Prix | Next race: 2020 San Marino Grand Prix |
