= Tatsuki Suzuki =

Japanese motorcycle racer (born 1997)

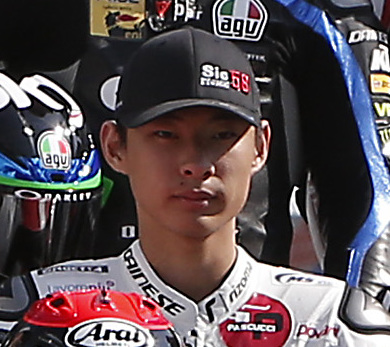
- Suzuki in 2019
- Nationality: Japanese
- Born: 24 September 1997 (age 29); Wakaba-ku, Chiba, Japan
Motorcycle racing career statistics
Moto3 World Championship
Active years	2015–2024
Manufacturers	Mahindra (2015–2016); Honda (2017–2023); Husqvarna (2024)
2024 championship position	14th (91 pts)
Starts / Wins / Podiums / Poles / F. laps / Points; 173 / 3 / 8 / 7 / 4 / 721

Tatsuki Suzuki (鈴木 竜生, Suzuki Tatsuki; born 24 September 1997) is a Japanese former professional motorcycle racer. He competed in Moto3 from 2015 to 2024, and is a 3-time race winner in the category. Suzuki is the 2006 champion of the Japanese Pit Bike Championship.

== Career ==
=== Moto3 World Championship ===
==== Mahindra CIP (2015) ====
Suzuki made his Grand Prix debut in the 2015 Moto3 World Championship with CIP, riding a Mahindra alongside Remy Gardner. He achieved his best result at Silverstone with a tenth place and he got another point scoring finish in his home race with a 13th place, scoring a total of nine points that season. Gardner only scored six points.

==== CIP-Unicom Starker (2016) ====
Suzuki remained with the same team for the 2016 Moto3 World Championship, but this time partnered by Fabio Spiranelli. Suzuki obtained seven point scoring finishes, with a best result of 11th at Sachsenring, finishing the season with 16 points: his teammate Spiranelli ended with no points.

==== Sic58 Squadra Corse (2017–2021) ====
For the 2017 season, Suzuki left CIP Mahindra, and joined Sic58 Squadra Corse, riding alongside Tony Arbolino. This would be Suzuki's best season yet, finishing in the points scoring positions constantly, amassing 71 points, with a season's best result of fourth in his home Grand Prix of Motegi. Arbolino finished the season with two points.

Sticking with Sic58 Squadra Corse for the 2018 season, Suzuki was partnered by Niccolò Antonelli. The two riders both finished with 71 points, and a season high finish of fourth, Suzuki in Australia, Antonelli in Qatar.

The pair was kept for the 2019 season, and as it turned out, it proved to be a very good choice, as both drivers excelled. Suzuki had the best season of his career, winning the race in San Marino from pole position, and finishing second in Jerez, behind teammate Antonelli who won the race, earning Sic58 Squadra Corse their history's first 1–2. Suzuki finished the year with 124 points, and eighth in the championship.

For the third consecutive year, Sic58 Squadra Corse went with Suzuki and Antonelli as its lineup, and Suzuki achieved similar success in the 2020 season as he did in 2019. He won the second race in Jerez, and finished third in San Marino, ending the year with 83 points and 12th in the championship. Antonelli however struggled, scoring no podiums, and only 40 points throughout the season.

In Suzuki's seventh season in Moto3, he failed to replicate his prior two seasons, finishing the 2021 season with no podiums, and 76 points, enough for 14th overall. Following Antonelli's poor season prior, he had a new teammate in Lorenzo Fellon, who was the only full time rider to not score a single point during the season.

==== Leopard Racing (2022–2023) ====
Suzuki remained in Moto3 for his eighth consecutive season in the class and joined Leopard Racing in 2022, partnering 2021 championship runner-up Dennis Foggia. After a steady start, the Japanese rider scored three podium finishes that season, finishing third at Mugello and Barcelona and narrowly missing victory at Spielberg, where he placed second, less than a tenth of a second behind compatriot Ayumu Sasaki. He finished seventh in the championship with 130 points, marking his best season in the Moto3 category. In 2023, Suzuki remained with Leopard Racing Team and partnered with Jaume Masià. He began the season with a victory in the second race of the season at the Argentine Republic Grand Prix, dominating in wet conditions. However, he failed to replicate this success throughout the remainder of the season, recording five retirements and missing two rounds following an injury sustained at Mugello. He was replaced by Adrian Fernandez after the Japanese Grand Prix.

==== Liqui Moly Husqvarna Intact GP (2024) ====
In October 2023, it was announced that Suzuki would stay in Moto3 and join Liqui Moly Husqvarna Intact GP, teaming up with Collin Veijer. The team change did not lead to improved results, as he struggled to compete for leading positions and match his teammate’s performances. His best result of the season was a sixth-place finish at the Grand Prix of the Americas. Suzuki ended the season in 14th place with 91 points on the board, leaving the Moto3 category by the end of the year.

==== Retirement from motorcycle racing ====
After failing to find a seat for the new season, Suzuki announced his retirement from racing via social media on 8 February 2025.

== Career statistics ==
=== FIM CEV Moto3 Junior World Championship ===
==== Races by year ====
(key) (Races in bold indicate pole position, races in italics indicate fastest lap)

Year	Bike	1	2	3	4	5	6	7	8	9	10	11	Pos	Pts
2014	Honda	JER1; 17	JER2; 15	LMS; 19	ARA; Ret	CAT1; 18	CAT2; 26	ALB; 15	NAV; 16	ALG; 20	VAL1; 29	VAL2; 16	32nd	2

=== Grand Prix motorcycle racing ===
==== By season ====
Season	Class	Motorcycle	Team	Race	Win	Podium	Pole	FLap	Pts	Plcd
2015	Moto3	Mahindra	CIP	18	0	0	0	0	9	28th
2016	Moto3	Mahindra	CIP–Unicom Starker	18	0	0	0	0	16	27th
2017	Moto3	Honda	Sic58 Squadra Corse	18	0	0	0	0	71	14th
2018	Moto3	Honda	Sic58 Squadra Corse	17	0	0	0	0	71	14th
2019	Moto3	Honda	Sic58 Squadra Corse	19	1	2	1	2	124	8th
2020	Moto3	Honda	Sic58 Squadra Corse	13	1	2	3	0	83	12th
2021	Moto3	Honda	Sic58 Squadra Corse	18	0	0	2	1	76	14th
2022	Moto3	Honda	Leopard Racing	20	0	3	1	0	130	7th
2023	Moto3	Honda	Leopard Racing	12	1	1	0	0	50	19th
2024	Moto3	Husqvarna	Liqui Moly Husqvarna Intact GP	20	0	0	0	1	91	14th
Total				**173**	**3**	**8**	**7**	**4**	**721**	

==== By class ====
Class	Seasons	1st GP	1st Pod	1st Win	Race	Win	Podiums	Pole	FLap	Pts	WChmp
Moto3	2015–present	2015 Qatar	2019 Spain	2019 San Marino	173	3	8	7	4	721	0
Total	2015–present				**173**	**3**	**8**	**7**	**4**	**721**	**0**

==== Races by year ====
(key) (Races in bold indicate pole position, races in italics indicate fastest lap)

Year	Class	Bike	1	2	3	4	5	6	7	8	9	10	11	12	13	14	15	16	17	18	19	20	Pos	Pts
2015	Moto3	Mahindra	QAT; 23	AME; Ret	ARG; 27	SPA; 23	FRA; Ret	ITA; Ret	CAT; 22	NED; Ret	GER; Ret	INP; 23	CZE; 20	GBR; 10	RSM; Ret	ARA; 16	JPN; 13	AUS; Ret	MAL; 21	VAL; Ret			28th	9
2016	Moto3	Mahindra	QAT; 28	ARG; 27	AME; 19	SPA; 15	FRA; 15	ITA; 19	CAT; 14	NED; Ret	GER; 11	AUT; Ret	CZE; 13	GBR; 25	RSM; Ret	ARA; 21	JPN; 15	AUS; 13	MAL; Ret	VAL; 18			27th	16
2017	Moto3	Honda	QAT; 15	ARG; 8	AME; Ret	SPA; Ret	FRA; Ret	ITA; Ret	CAT; 10	NED; 8	GER; 9	CZE; 8	AUT; Ret	GBR; 11	RSM; Ret	ARA; 13	JPN; 4	AUS; 9	MAL; Ret	VAL; 11			14th	71
2018	Moto3	Honda	QAT; DNS	ARG; 21	AME; 9	SPA; 6	FRA; 9	ITA; 17	CAT; 5	NED; 13	GER; Ret	CZE; 14	AUT; 18	GBR; C	RSM; Ret	ARA; 6	THA; Ret	JPN; 15	AUS; 4	MAL; 9	VAL; Ret		14th	71
2019	Moto3	Honda	QAT; Ret	ARG; 13	AME; Ret	SPA; 2	FRA; Ret	ITA; 8	CAT; 19	NED; Ret	GER; 8	CZE; Ret	AUT; Ret	GBR; 5	**RSM**; 1	ARA; 6	THA; Ret	JPN; 4	AUS; 4	MAL; Ret	VAL; 4		8th	124
2020	Moto3	Honda	**QAT**; 5	**SPA**; 8	**ANC**; 1	CZE; Ret	AUT; 10	STY; 7	RSM; 3	EMI; DNS	CAT	FRA; Ret	ARA; 8	TER; Ret	EUR; Ret	VAL; Ret	POR; Ret						12th	83
2021	Moto3	Honda	QAT; 8	DOH; 12	POR; Ret	**SPA**; Ret	FRA; Ret	**ITA**; 10	CAT; Ret	GER; 8	NED; 5	STY; 15	AUT; 11	GBR; 5	ARA; 9	RSM; 15	AME; 9	EMI; Ret	ALR; 9	VAL; Ret			14th	76
2022	Moto3	Honda	QAT; Ret	INA; 10	ARG; 5	AME; 10	POR; 12	SPA; Ret	FRA; 5	ITA; 3	CAT; 3	GER; 5	NED; 4	GBR; Ret	AUT; 2	RSM; 6	ARA; 12	**JPN**; Ret	THA; Ret	AUS; Ret	MAL; Ret	VAL; 14	7th	130
2023	Moto3	Honda	POR; 14	ARG; 1	AME; Ret	SPA; 8	FRA; 13	ITA; Ret	GER	NED	GBR; Ret	AUT; 13	CAT; 8	RSM; 15	IND; Ret	JPN; Ret	INA	AUS	THA	MAL	QAT	VAL	19th	50
2024	Moto3	Husqvarna	QAT; 7	POR; 12	AME; 6	SPA; 25	FRA; 9	CAT; 15	ITA; Ret	NED; Ret	GER; 9	GBR; 10	AUT; 12	ARA; 14	RSM; 8	EMI; 14	INA; 7	JPN; 7	AUS; 15	THA; 10	MAL; Ret	SLD; 13	14th	91
