= CRP Group =

Italian industrial group

The CRP Group is an Italian industrial group specialising in additive manufacturing, Rapid Prototyping and high precision machining services in the motorsport, automotive, space, boating, design, medical and UAV sectors. In the automotive sector, CRP Group has been building electric motorcycles since 2014 through the start-up Energica Motor Company, a member of its group.

In 2015, CRP Group consists of CRP Technologies, CRP Racing, CRP USA, Energica Motor Company, CRP Engineering, CRP Meccanica and CRP Service.

In January 2021, CRP Meccanica became Italy's exclusive distributor of the Sapphire SLM metal 3D printing system, a "full-stack solution", in agreement with the American company Velo3D.

== History ==
The CRP Group was founded in 1970 as Roberto Cevolini & C. snc. Established by Roberto Cevolini, the company was a supplier of contract machining services, mainly in the motorsport sector and in the manufacture of components for F1 racing cars. In 2000, in association with Team Minardi, on the Minardi M02 the company introduced the first F1 gearbox manufactured by titanium rapid casting, a solution later also adopted by other teams.

By 2002 Roberto Cevolini & C. had grown to employ more than 50 people and a new in-house technology department was created: CRP Technology. This company division was led by Roberto's son Franco Cevolini, a materials engineering specialist who branched out into the research and development of rapid prototyping materials and technologies, creating the Windform family of materials.

In 2003 CRP Technology was incorporated as a company, also including Roberto Cevolini & C. within its organisation. Its core business continued to be high-precision machining, additive manufacturing, and the worldwide distribution of Windform materials.

In 2006 the company initiated CRP Racing, which raced its 125 motorbikes in the Honda Trophy and the Italian Motorcycle Road Racing Championship (Campionato Italiano Velocità), with young riders recruited by the technical staff who took also part in MotoGP.

In 2009 CRP Racing began building an electric racing motorcycle, the eCRP, which competed in the TTXGP and e-Power championship, winning the European Champion, and Vice-World Champion title of TTXGP.

CRP USA was founded in USA in 2008. CRP USA provides an additive manufacturing and 3D printing service and distributes the Windform materials on the American market. CRP USA is based in North Carolina. CRP USA constructs parts using the Windform materials for the space, motorsports, entertainment, automotive and defence industries.

In July 2010, CRP Technology created three new companies: CRP Engineering, CRP Meccanica and CRP Service.
