= Motorsport Industry Association =

- Abbreviation: MIA
- Formation: April 1994
- Type: Trade association
- Legal status: Limited company
- Purpose: Motorsport in the United Kingdom
- Headquarters: Federation House, Stoneleigh Park, Warwickshire, CV8 2LG
- Region served: UK
- Chief Executive: Chris Aylett
- Main organ: MIA Committee (President - The Rt Hon the Lord Astor of Hever, PC, DL, Chairman - Jim Morris, Managing Director, Lifeline Fire & Safety Systems)
- Website: MIA

The Motorsport Industry Association is the global trade association for the motorsport industry and is based in the United Kingdom. Most top-level motorsport constructors are based in the UK. Around 75% of motorsport research and development takes place in the UK.

== History ==
The Motorsport Industry Association (MIA) is a global trade association for the motorsport, performance engineering, services and tuning sectors. The MIA represents the specialised needs of this highly successful global industry as it undergoes continuing rapid development throughout the world.

Although most of the British motorsport industry is based in the so-called Motorsport Valley (the name comes from Silicon Valley) in Northamptonshire and Oxfordshire, around the Silverstone Circuit, the organisation is in Warwickshire. Motorsport Valley is a registered trade mark of the Motorsport Industry Association, owned by them on behalf of its members.

== Function ==
It represents the UK motorsport industry at a national level. Around 4,000 companies in the UK are involved in the motorsport industry, with an annual turnover of around £9 billion, with around 70% being exports. It spends 30% of turnover on research and development. There are around 25,000 qualified engineers involved in the UK industry. The MIA was started by Brian Sims, ex-Marketing Director of F1 Benetton and Lola and the current CEO, Chris Aylett took over in 1997.

National Motorsport Week – running from the end of June each year – is a special celebration of UK motor sport jointly promoted by the Motorsport Industry Association (MIA) and the Motor Sports Association (MSA) and starts with the Goodwood Festival of Speed and finishes with the British Formula One Grand Prix at Silverstone.

== Structure ==
In April 1994, leading personalities in British motorsport joined forces to form their own trade association - the MIA - with the aim of promoting one of the UK's most successful industries - motorsport. The original concept was proposed by Founder and original CEO, Brian Sims, with the first Executive Committee comprising Rob Baldock (Accenture); Dick Scammel (Cosworth);Tony Schulp (Haymarket); John Kirkpatrick (Jim Russell Racing Drivers School); Tony Panaro (Euro Northern Travel) and Tony Fletcher (Premier Fuels).

The Rt Hon the Lord Astor of Hever, PC, DL accepted the role of Honorary MIA President for a second time when his term as a Defence Minister ended in 2015.

The MIA has embraced an ever-expanding international network of business contacts, the result being that today it boasts nearly 400 Global members, whose companies transact more than £9 billion of motorsport business worldwide.

== See also ==
- Formula One Group
- Formula One Constructors Association
- Motor Sports Association - governing body
- Automotive industry in the United Kingdom
- Glossary of motorsport terms
