= Energica Ego =

Type of all-electric sport motorcycle

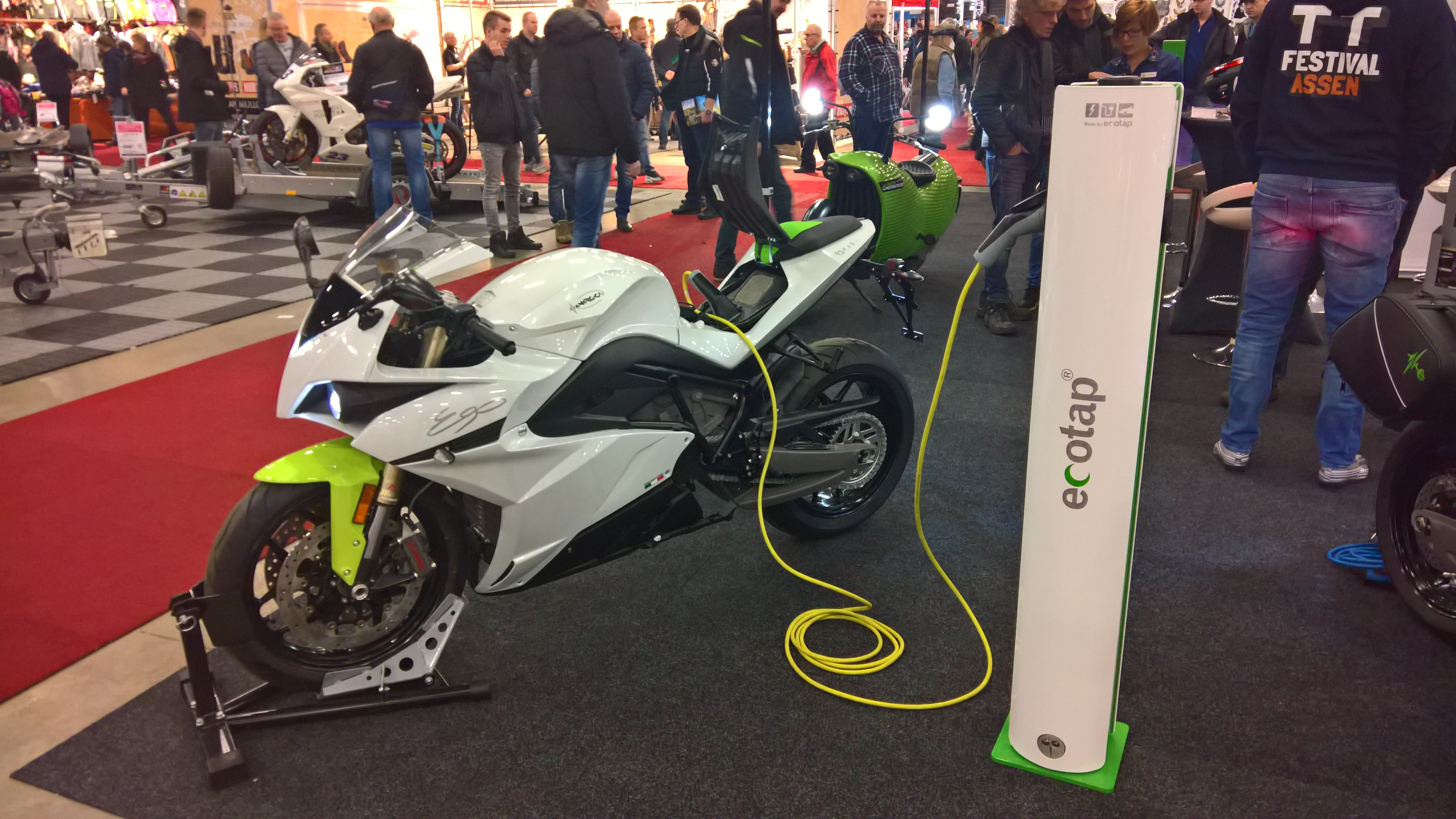
- Energica Ego displayed at Assen in 2018
- Manufacturer: Energica Motor Company
- Class: Sportbike
- Top speed: 245 km/h
- Power: 107 kW (143 hp; 145 PS)
- Torque: 200 N⋅m (150 lbf⋅ft)
- Transmission: Electric with park assist (slow reverse and forward)
- Frame type: Steel trellis
- Suspension: Front: 43 mm, adjustable rebound and compression damping, Spring preload Rear: Swingarm on mono shock, Adjustable Rebound, Spring Preload
- Brakes: Brembo; Front: Double 330 mm radial discs, 4 pistons callipre Rear: Single 240 mm disc, 2 pistons callipre
- Tires: Pirelli Diablo Rosso III; Front: 120/70 Rim 17; Rear: 180/55 Rim 17
- Wheelbase: 1,465 mm
- Dimensions: L: 2,140 mm W: 870 mm H: 1,220 mm
- Seat height: 795 mm
- Weight: 258–280 kg (dry)
- Fuel capacity: 13.4 kWh (EGO), 21.5 kWh (EGO+ and EGO+ RS)
- Range: 130-190 km
- Related: Energica Eva

The Energica Ego is an electrically propelled sport road motorcycle designed and marketed by Energica Motor Company. It is claimed by Energica to be the world's first street-legal electric Italian sport motorcycle. The prototype was finished in 2013 and the vehicle came into the market in 2015. The prototype made use of new technologies such as CNC and 3D-printing, including the dashboard and headlights which were 3D-printed.

== Design ==
The Ego is an all-electric motorcycle. It has a 107 kW motor with 200 Nm of torque (at low RPM), giving it a top speed of 240 km/h. The motor is powered by an 11.7 kW⋅h battery. The Ego weighs approximately 258–280 kg, contributed to by the heavy battery.

It has four-level adjustable engine braking, which is also regenerative. The motor is situated near the cast aluminium swing-arm and side-mounted mono shock. Projector headlamps are used for headlights. The dashboard is a 109.22 mm TFT display.

Before 2017, it had a 136 hp electric motor with 180 Nm torque. However, the naked sibling 'Eva' produces 108 hp which was 95 hp before 2017. They are also EURO IV compliant after 2017. The price was also reduced to approximately £20,000.

The bike has a tubular steel trellis frame partly visible despite the fairings.

Upgraded again in 2019, they are equipped with an electric throttle that can read adjustments down to tenths of mrad. Other electronic features such as "silent charging" and heated hand grips were also added.

== Performance ==
The Ego reaches 100 km/h in 3 seconds, has a 43 mm Marzocchi front fork and Brembo brakes with ABS and anti-rollover functions. According to some reviewers, the suspension is relatively softly calibrated. It has a controller named a ”VCU” by Energica, similar to an ESC. It is claimed to be controlling all aspects – from battery to engine (including engine braking) by Energica.

The Ego has a range of approximately 160 km under normal use (190 km in ”eco” mode).

The battery can be recharged to 85% in 30 minutes with fast charging capabilities (mode 4, DC fast charge) or 100% in 3.5 hours (mode 2 or 3, 240 V). However, it takes 8 hours to full charge with standard US power supply of 120 V. The battery life is 1200 cycles at 80% capacity.

== Production ==
The first prototype was finished by Energica in 2013 and the vehicle went into production with sales starting from 2015. According to Top Speed, it is currently facing ”Inventory shortage” as the production is less than demand.

== MotoE ==
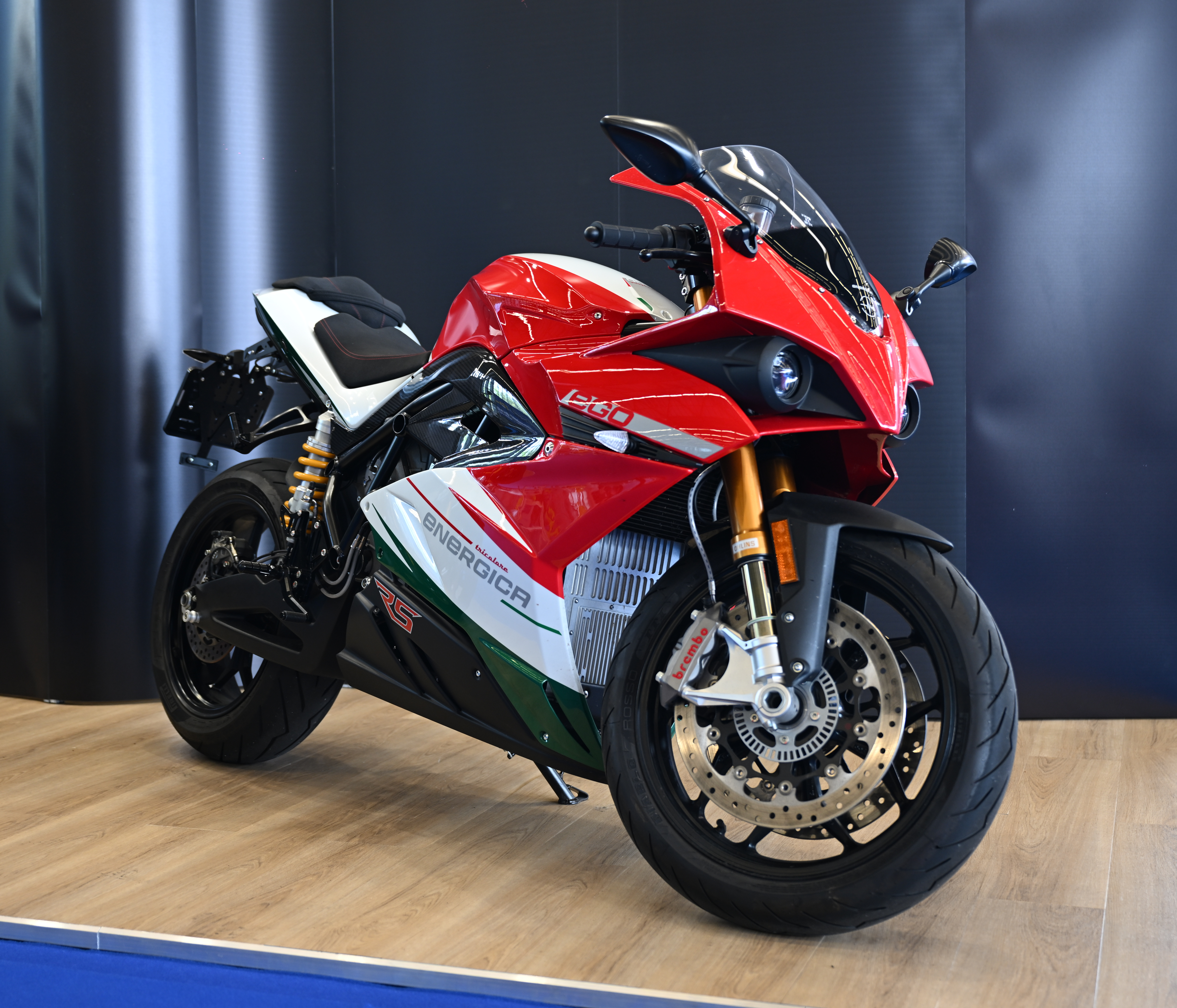
Energica Ego at Fully Charged in 2022

An electric motorcycle class (MotoE) was added as a support to Grand Prix motorcycle racing from 2019. It is a single make class, unlike the other class races which are between different manufacturers. A performance oriented model Ego Corsa is used for MotoE.

=== Ego Corsa ===
Corsa is the race track variant of the Ego with Michelin tires and performance tweaks. According to Energica, its motor produces 120 kW (previously 110 kW) continuous power and 200 Nm torque, reaching a top speed of 168 mph (previously 155 mph). Acceleration from 0 to 60 mph is less than 2.8 seconds. According to Power and Top speed, the race track Ego produces at least 149PS and has a top speed of 175 mph (281 km/h).

The battery is a 20 kWh lithium ion, lighter and more compact than that on the standard Ego.

The power output is comparable to the Moto2 class (three-cylinder 765 cc); however, due to the higher weight of the bikes because of the batteries, the power-to-weight ratio is comparatively closer to the Moto3 class (single-cylinder 250 cc). Of the four circuits used so far, only the hilly Red Bull Ring has resulted in quicker laptimes than the Moto3 class, with the electric bikes typically being 1–1.5 seconds per lap slower.

The longest race so far has been 29.582 kilometres (18.381 mi).

== Ego 45 ==
On 45th anniversary of Energica's parent company, CRP Group, a special version of Energica Ego, the Ego 45, was introduced at Top Marques Monaco 2014 show.

== See also ==
- Electric vehicle
- Energica Motor Company
- Zero S
