= Energica Motor Company =

Electric motorcycle manufacturer based in Italy

Energica Motor Company S.p.A.
- Traded as: BIT: EMC
- Industry: Vehicle Manufacturing
- Founded: Modena, Italy (2014)
- Founders: Livia Cevolini; Franco Cevolini
- Headquarters: Modena, Italy
- Key people: Franco Cevolini Founder; Livia Cevolini Founder and CEO; Giampiero Testoni CTO; Andrea Vezzani CFO
- Products: Electric motorcycle
- Website: energicamotor.com

Energica Motor Company is an Italian manufacturer of electric motorcycles. The Energica project was started in 2010 in Modena, Italy, by CRP Group, an international company involved in computer numerical control machining and additive manufacturing with advanced selective laser sintering materials. Energica Motor Company was officially founded in 2014 with the aim of creating high-performance sustainable motorcycles.

On 28 March 2022, Energica Motor Company was delisted from the Milan Stock Exchange. The company was privatized and delisted by Ideanomics, Inc. Ideanomics gained a 72.42% stake in the company. The Cevolini family retained 17.62% ownership in Energica. This transaction was pioneered by EuroScope Capital (FirstEurope), an investment bank based in New York, NY. Energica Motor Company filed for a bankruptcy judicial liquidation on 14 October 2024.. The company was rescued by a group of Singaporean investors in August 2025 and are working on restarting production of their motorcycles

== Name ==
Energica is, in Italian, the feminine form of the adjective "energetic".

== Racing ==
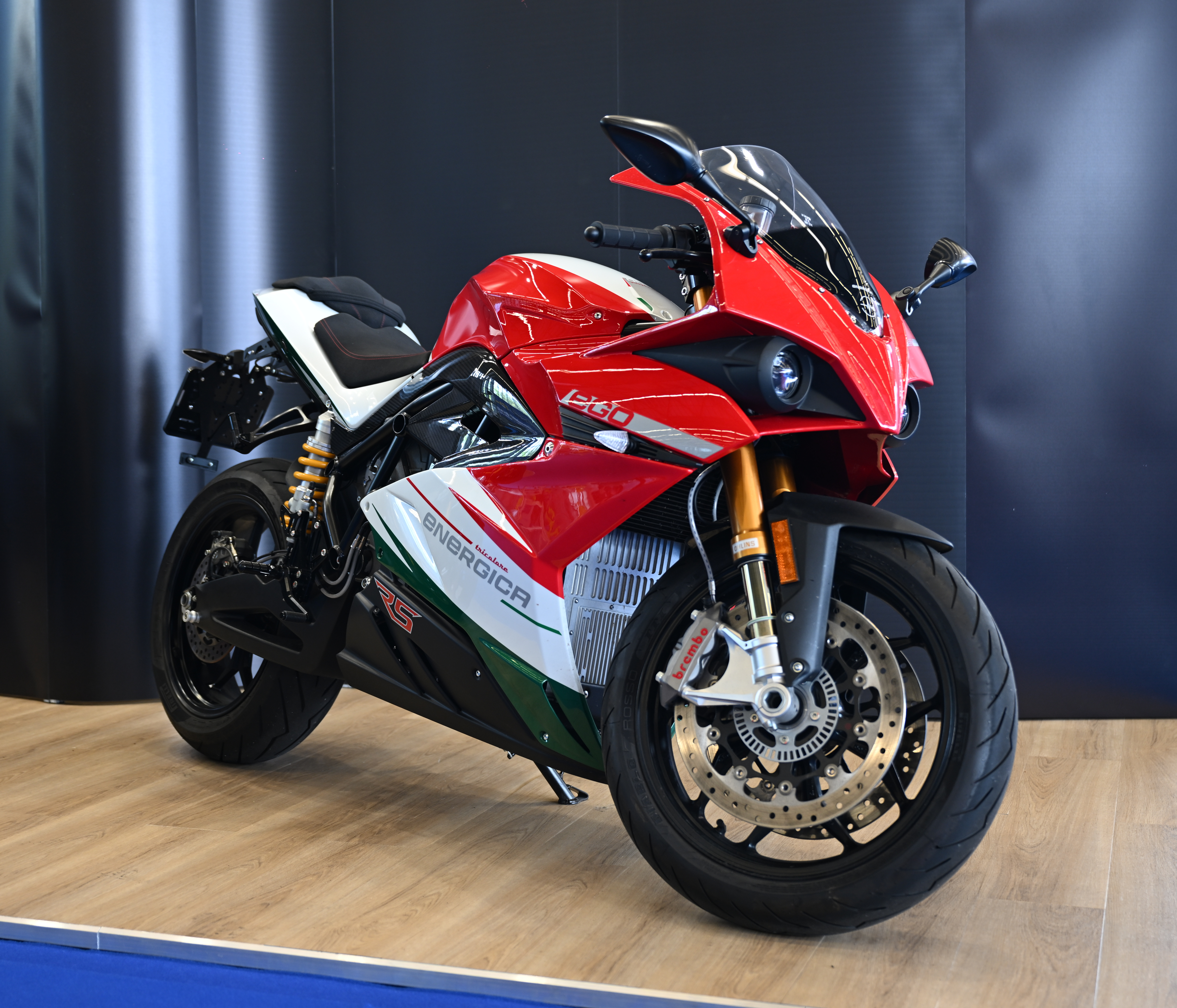
Energica Ego in 2022

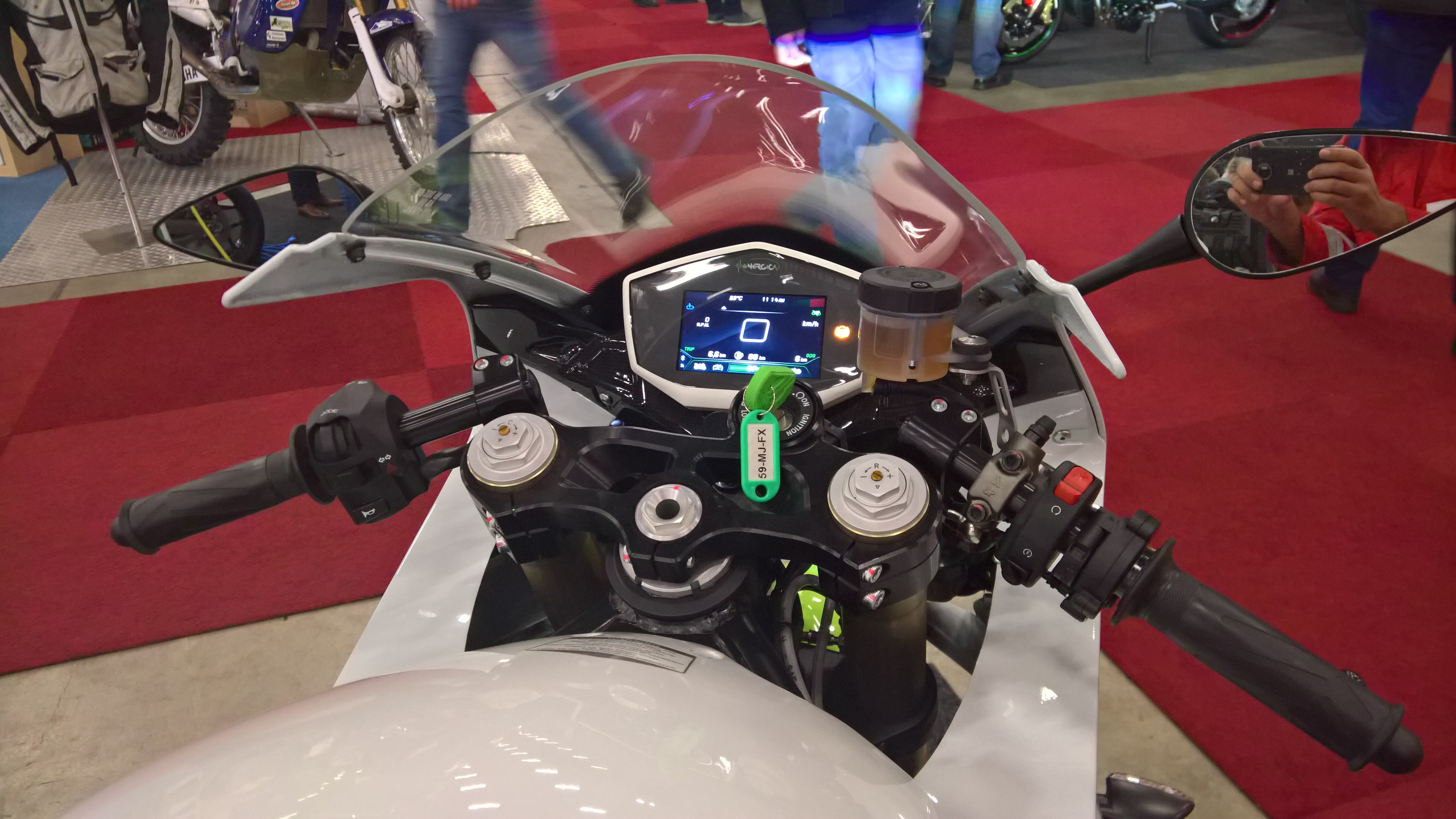
View of the 2018 Ego cockpit

In 2010 CRP designed and built the eCRP, the electric racing motorcycle. The eCRP 1.0 was presented during the "Cleaner Racing Conference" in Birmingham on January 13, 2010. It was introduced by Lord Paul Drayson, UK's former Minister for Science and Innovation, with the support of the Motorsport Industry Association.

The eCRP, unlike most other electric racing motorcycles which were usually only a conversion of traditional combustion engines into electric vehicles, was created from the ground up as a real electric racing motorcycle, specifically designed for 100% electrical power. In later 2010 the eCRP 1.2 made its debut on the track at Assen, in the TTXGP EU with the professional rider Alessandro Brannetti.

The eCRP 1.2 was the first competition version of the electric motorcycle made in CRP. On October 2 and 3 2010, the eCRP 1.2 competed at Brands Hatch and won the title of European Champion TTXGP 2010. The team went on the podium at the World Final Albacete, taking second place. In 2011 CRP developed a new version of the Italian electric racing motorcycle, the eCRP 1.4. The use of Additive Manufacturing and the innovative materials of the Windform product line represented a crucial stage in the construction of the electric racing motorcycle, carried out in collaboration with CRP Technology. The chassis of the electric racing motorcycle eCRP 1.4 featured a cast aluminum frame, welded aluminum swingarm, and racing suspension.

The eCRP 1.4 was also equipped with a data logger and sensors with built-in GPS, a new racing dashboard, dual DC motor, and integrated air cooling. The eCRP 1.4 was ideally suited for the two new classes of TTXGP, Formula 75 and Open Formula GP, as widely demonstrated by eCRP 1.2. After two years of racing, the eCRP team started working on the road version: Energica.

Energica Ego Corsa in 2018

An electric motorcycle class (MotoE) was added as a support to Grand Prix motorcycle racing from 2019. It is a single make class, unlike the other class races which are between different manufacturers. A performance oriented model Ego Corsa is used for MotoE.

In a 2020 TechCrunch interview, CEO Livia Cevolini highlighted the company's involvement in racing as something that gives Energica a leg up in product development over other EV manufacturers, such as Zero Motorcycles. Because of racing, "We're in a different category," she said. "They have less power, less range, and less fast charge capability."

In 2023, Energica competed in the MotoAmerica season, where they became the first electric motorcycle brand to compete full time in a motorcycle road racing series against internal-combustion-engine motorcycles.

== Model history ==
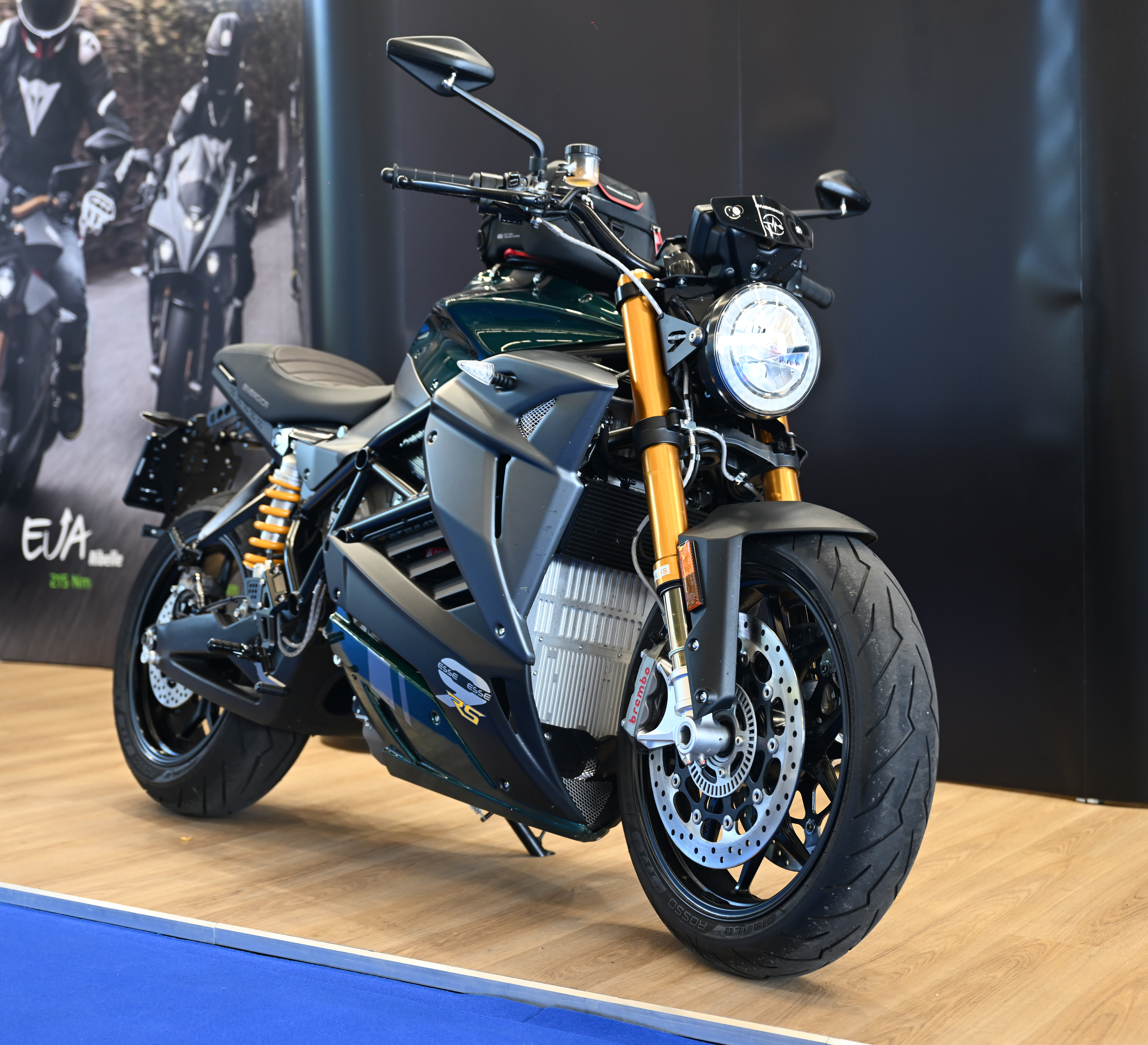
Energica EsseEsse9+ RS on display at Fully Charged Europe 2022

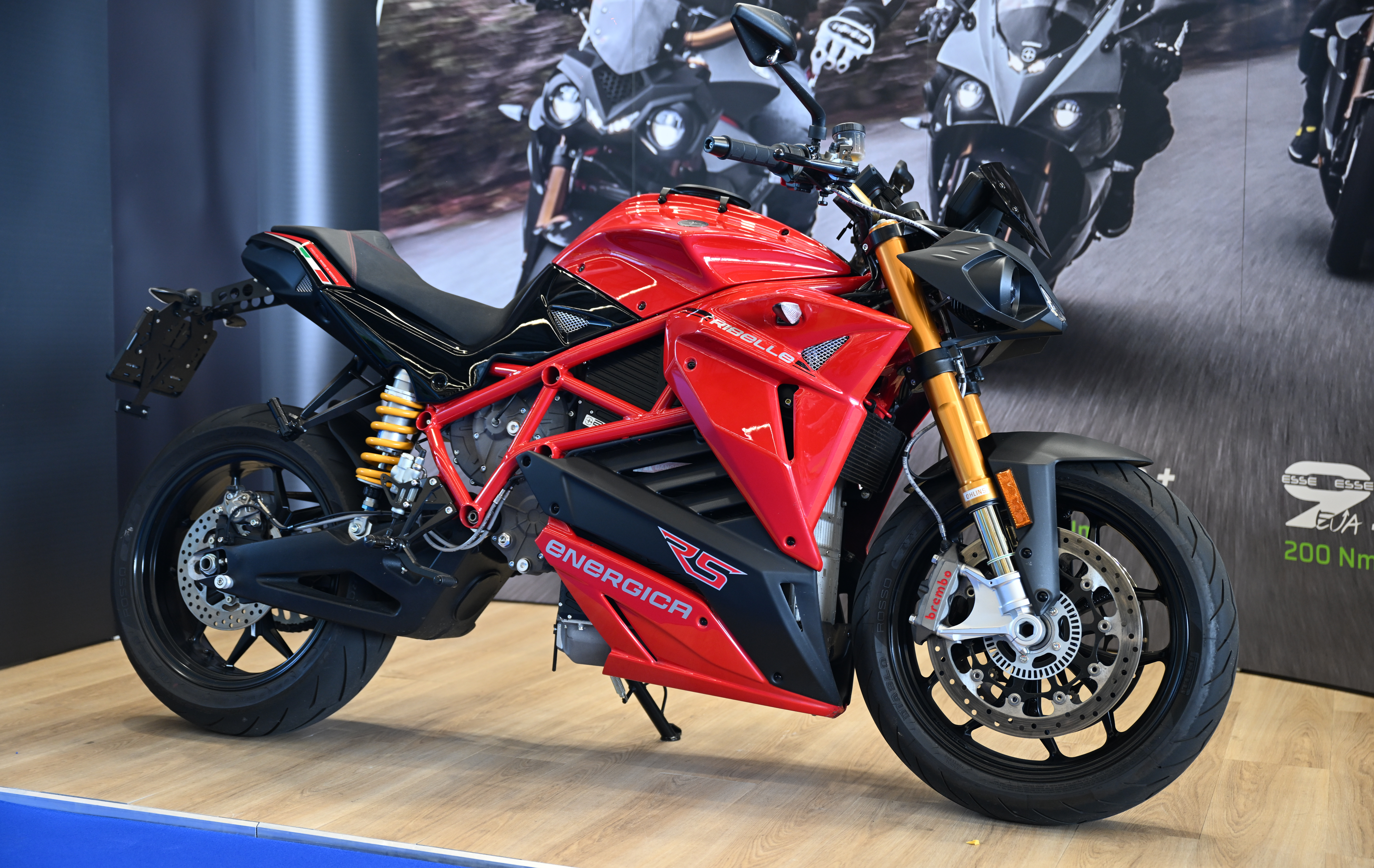
Eva Ribelle RS on display

In 2012 CRP presented at EICMA the running prototype of Energica and in 2013 launched the first model Ego. The production Ego would eventually feature: multiple ride modes and levels of regenerative braking; a low-speed reverse mode; Bosch anti-lock braking system; a 100 kW oil-cooled, permanent-magnet AC motor; a 11.7 kW⋅h battery (nominal; max 13.4 kW⋅h), with a claimed range of 150 km at 80 km/h; and Mode-4 DC supercharging capability.

In April 2014, Ego45, the numbered luxury edition of Energica Ego, was displayed at Top Marques, Monte-Carlo. In November 2014 CRP presented at EICMA the birth of Energica Motor Company S.p.A. and Energica Motor Company Inc., the US division.

That same year at EICMA, the new born company displayed the second model, Energica Eva. The Eva shared the same electric powertrain and chassis as the Ego with the motor limited to 80 kW of power and top speed limited to 200 km/h. The electric streetfighter was displayed alongside three Energica Ego configurations: Matte Pearl White, Matte Black and Energica Ego45 Carbon.

In 2017, Energica introduced its third model, the Eva EsseEsse9, with an "old school" design and more relaxed riding position, again sharing the powertrain and chassis as the Ego with the same power limits as the Eva. The Eva was also given a 107 kW version, known as the Eva 107, featuring the full 107 kW output of the Ego powertrain, electronically limited to a top speed of 200 km/h.
