= 2020 Moto2 World Championship =

11th running of the Moto2 World Championship

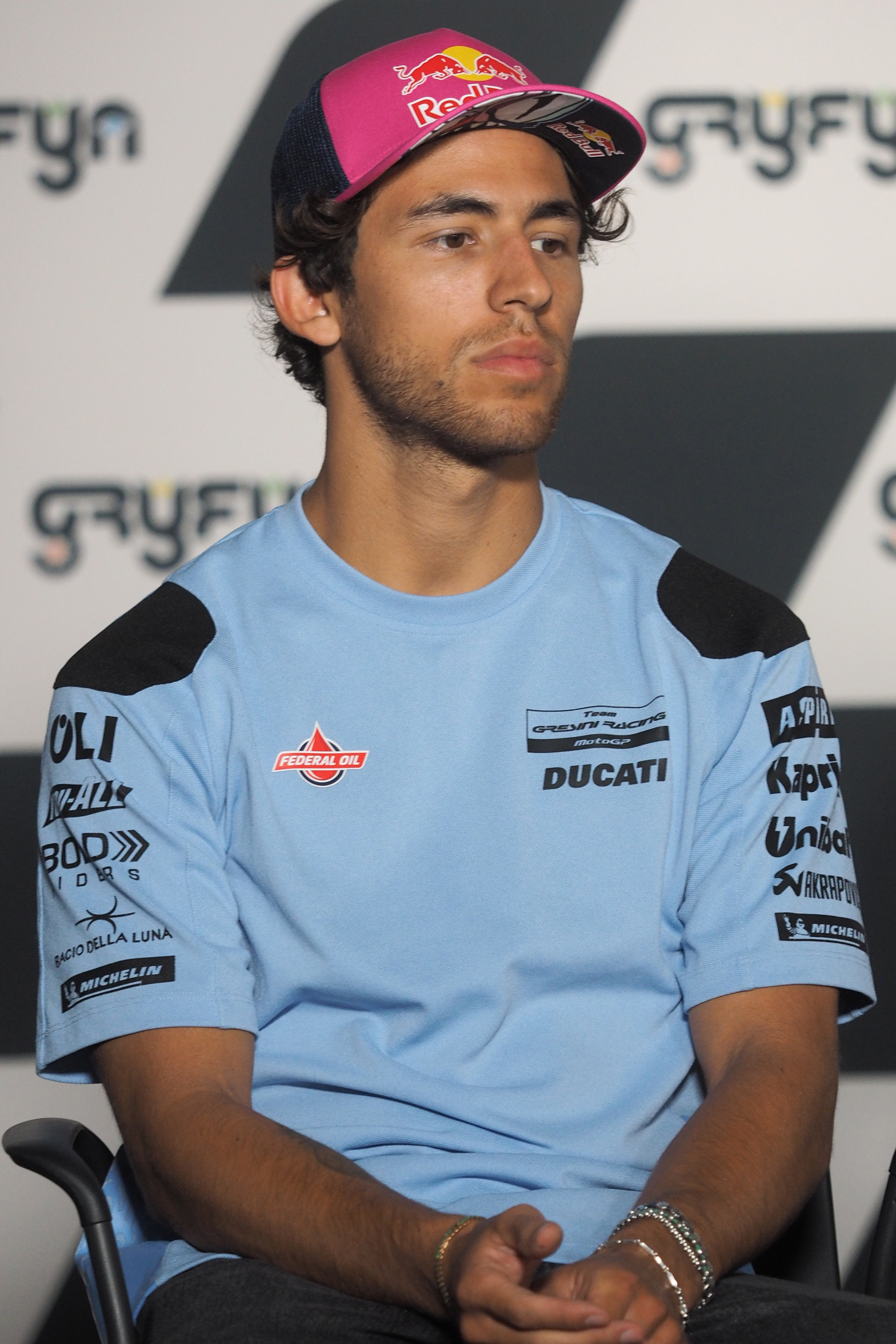
Enea Bastianini (pictured in 2022) was the 2020 Moto2 World Riders' Champion.

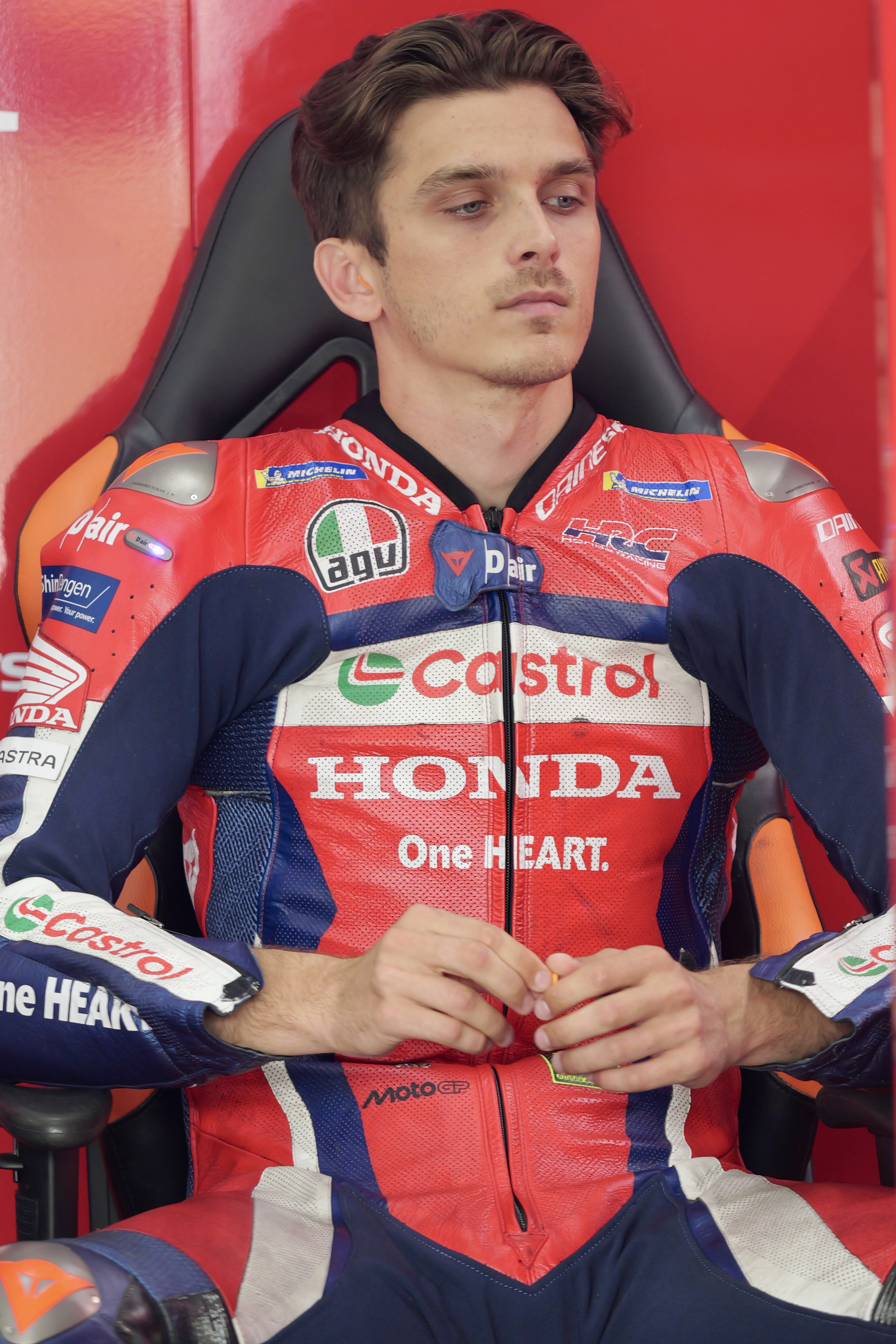
Luca Marini (pictured in 2025) finished runner-up.

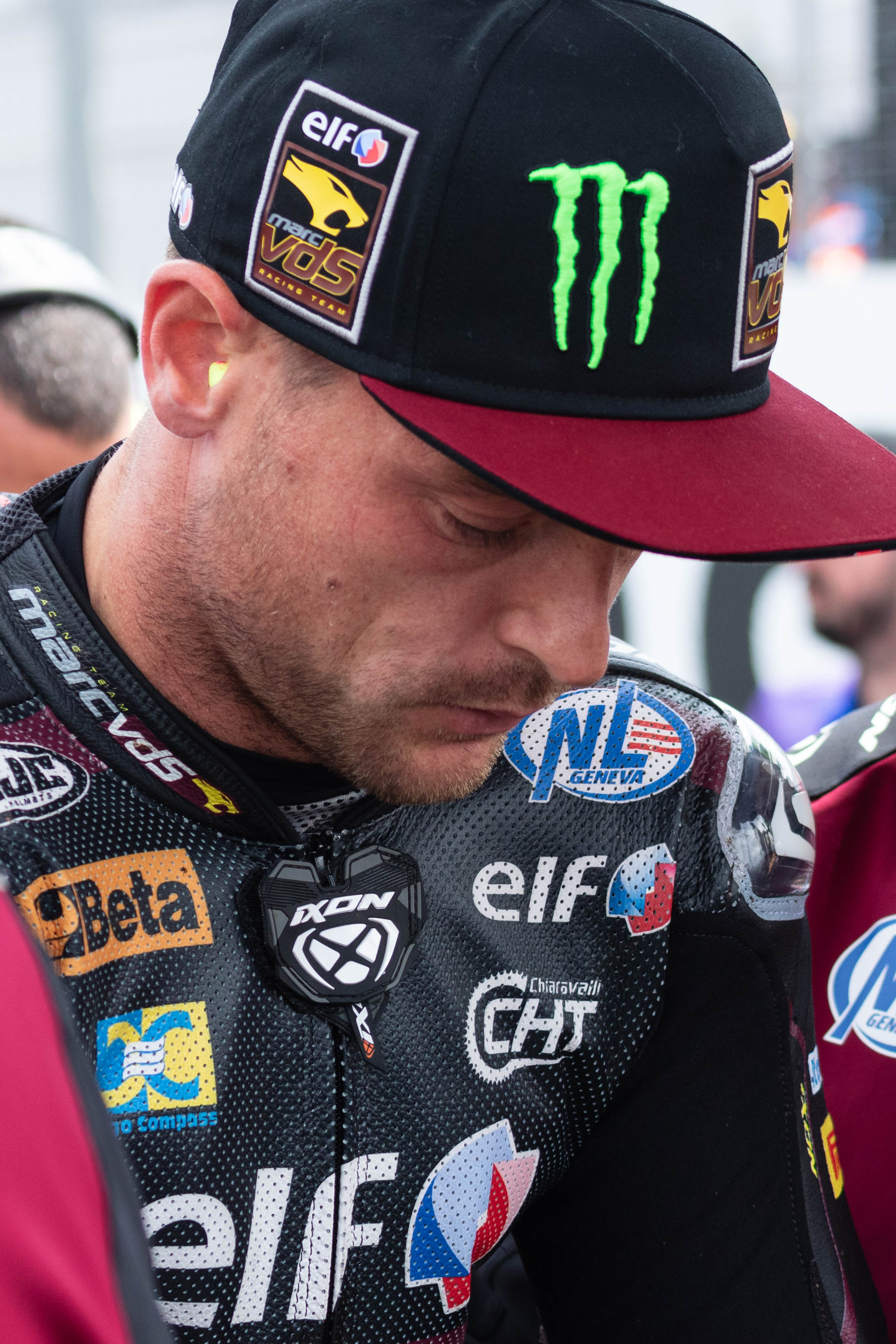
Sam Lowes (pictured in 2024) finished third.

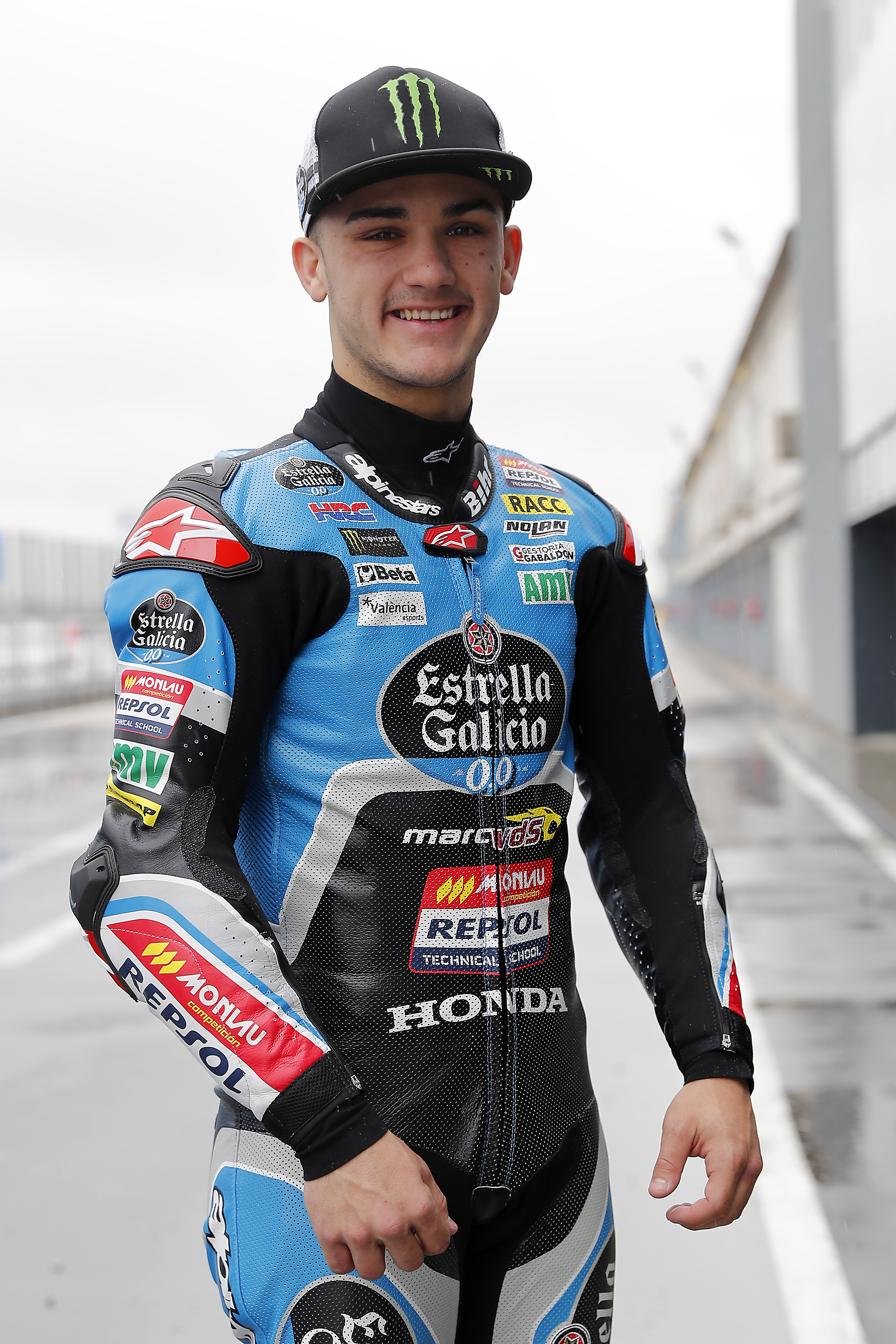
Arón Canet (pictured in 2018), the 2020 Moto2 Rookie of the Year.

The 2020 FIM Moto2 World Championship was the intermediate class of the 72nd Fédération Internationale de Motocyclisme (FIM) Road Racing World Championship season. The season calendar was significantly affected by the COVID-19 pandemic, with numerous races postponed or cancelled.

Enea Bastianini won the Moto2 championship with seven podiums and three wins, finishing nine points ahead of championship runner up Luca Marini.

== Teams and riders ==
Team	Constructor	Motorcycle	No.	Rider	Rounds
(United States) American Racing (United States) Tennor American Racing	Kalex	Moto2	16	(United States) Joe Roberts	All
(United States) American Racing (United States) Tennor American Racing	Kalex	Moto2	42	(Spain) Marcos Ramírez	All
(Belgium) EG 0,0 Marc VDS	Kalex	Moto2	22	(United Kingdom) Sam Lowes	All
(Belgium) EG 0,0 Marc VDS	Kalex	Moto2	37	(Spain) Augusto Fernández	All
(Italy) Federal Oil Gresini Moto2	Kalex	Moto2	11	(Italy) Nicolò Bulega	All
(Italy) Federal Oil Gresini Moto2	Kalex	Moto2	57	(Spain) Edgar Pons	All
(Spain) Flexbox HP40	Kalex	Moto2	7	(Italy) Lorenzo Baldassarri	All
(Spain) Flexbox HP40	Kalex	Moto2	40	(Spain) Héctor Garzó	All
(Japan) Idemitsu Honda Team Asia	Kalex	Moto2	27	(Indonesia) Andi Farid Izdihar	All
(Japan) Idemitsu Honda Team Asia	Kalex	Moto2	35	(Thailand) Somkiat Chantra	All
(Italy) Italtrans Racing Team	Kalex	Moto2	19	(Italy) Lorenzo Dalla Porta	All
(Italy) Italtrans Racing Team	Kalex	Moto2	33	(Italy) Enea Bastianini	All
(Germany) Liqui Moly Intact GP	Kalex	Moto2	12	(Switzerland) Thomas Lüthi	All
(Germany) Liqui Moly Intact GP	Kalex	Moto2	23	(Germany) Marcel Schrötter	All
(Malaysia) Onexox TKKR SAG Team	Kalex	Moto2			
(Malaysia) Onexox TKKR SAG Team	Kalex	Moto2	87	(Australia) Remy Gardner	1–7, 9–15
(Malaysia) Onexox TKKR SAG Team	Kalex	Moto2	99	(Malaysia) Kasma Daniel	All
(Malaysia) Petronas Sprinta Racing	Kalex	Moto2	96	(United Kingdom) Jake Dixon	1–13
(Malaysia) Petronas Sprinta Racing	Kalex	Moto2	97	(Spain) Xavi Vierge	All
(Finland) Red Bull KTM Ajo	Kalex	Moto2	45	(Japan) Tetsuta Nagashima	All
(Finland) Red Bull KTM Ajo	Kalex	Moto2	88	(Spain) Jorge Martín	1–6, 9–15
(Finland) Red Bull KTM Ajo	Kalex	Moto2	54	(Italy) Mattia Pasini	8
(Italy) Sky Racing Team VR46	Kalex	Moto2	10	(Italy) Luca Marini	All
(Italy) Sky Racing Team VR46	Kalex	Moto2	72	(Italy) Marco Bezzecchi	All
(Switzerland) MV Agusta Forward Racing	MV Agusta	F2	24	(Italy) Simone Corsi	All
(Switzerland) MV Agusta Forward Racing	MV Agusta	F2	62	(Italy) Stefano Manzi	All
(Netherlands) NTS RW Racing GP	NTS	NH7	2	(Switzerland) Jesko Raffin	1–3, 7
(Netherlands) NTS RW Racing GP	NTS	NH7	77	(Switzerland) Dominique Aegerter	4–6, 15
(Netherlands) NTS RW Racing GP	NTS	NH7	74	(Poland) Piotr Biesiekirski	8–14
(Netherlands) NTS RW Racing GP	NTS	NH7	64	(Netherlands) Bo Bendsneyder	All
(Spain) Aspar Team (Spain) Inde Aspar Team Moto2 (Spain) Openbank Aspar Team Moto2 (Spain) Oceanica Aspar Team Moto2 (Spain) Kipin Energy Aspar Team Moto2 (Spain) Pull&Bear Aspar Team Moto2	Speed Up	SF20T	44	(Spain) Arón Canet	1–10, 13–15
(Spain) Aspar Team (Spain) Inde Aspar Team Moto2 (Spain) Openbank Aspar Team Moto2 (Spain) Oceanica Aspar Team Moto2 (Spain) Kipin Energy Aspar Team Moto2 (Spain) Pull&Bear Aspar Team Moto2	Speed Up	SF20T	18	(Andorra) Xavier Cardelús	11–12
(Spain) Aspar Team (Spain) Inde Aspar Team Moto2 (Spain) Openbank Aspar Team Moto2 (Spain) Oceanica Aspar Team Moto2 (Spain) Kipin Energy Aspar Team Moto2 (Spain) Pull&Bear Aspar Team Moto2	Speed Up	SF20T	55	(Malaysia) Hafizh Syahrin	1–5, 7–15
(Spain) Aspar Team (Spain) Inde Aspar Team Moto2 (Spain) Openbank Aspar Team Moto2 (Spain) Oceanica Aspar Team Moto2 (Spain) Kipin Energy Aspar Team Moto2 (Spain) Pull&Bear Aspar Team Moto2	Speed Up	SF20T	5	(Spain) Alejandro Medina	6
(Italy) Beta Tools Speed Up (Italy) HDR Heidrun Speed Up (Italy) MB Conveyors Speed Up (Italy) +Ego Speed Up (Italy) Termozeta Speed Up	Speed Up	SF20T	9	(Spain) Jorge Navarro	All
(Italy) Beta Tools Speed Up (Italy) HDR Heidrun Speed Up (Italy) MB Conveyors Speed Up (Italy) +Ego Speed Up (Italy) Termozeta Speed Up	Speed Up	SF20T	21	(Italy) Fabio Di Giannantonio	All

Key
Regular rider
Replacement rider

All teams used series-specified Dunlop tyres and Triumph 765cc 3-cylinder engines.

=== Team changes ===
- KTM withdrew from Moto2 to focus on their MotoGP and Moto3 programmes, resulting in the following:
  - American Racing and Ajo Motorsport switched to using Kalex bikes.
  - Ángel Nieto Team switched to Speed Up machines.
  - Tech3 switched to a Moto3 programme.
- Sport organizer Dorna Sports have moved to prohibit single-entry teams, resulting in the following:
  - Both Federal Oil Gresini Moto2 and Petronas Sprinta Racing expanded to two bikes for the first time since the 2014 season.
  - Kiefer Racing and Tasca Racing Scuderia Moto2 withdrew from Moto2.
- Ángel Nieto Team reverted to their former name of Aspar.

=== Rider changes ===
- Sam Lowes moved from Gresini Racing to EG 0,0 Marc VDS, replacing Xavi Vierge, who moved to Petronas Sprinta Racing.
- Arón Canet moved up to Moto2, joining Aspar Team.
- Lorenzo Dalla Porta moved up to Moto2 with Italtrans Racing Team, replacing Andrea Locatelli, who moved to the Supersport World Championship.
- Jesko Raffin returned to Moto2 with NTS RW Racing GP, where he'd already ridden at the first three events and the last four races before Valencia in 2019 as a replacement rider for Steven Odendaal, whom he will also now replace permanently.
- Marco Bezzecchi moved to Sky Racing Team VR46, replacing Nicolò Bulega, who moved to Federal Oil Gresini Racing.
- Jake Dixon moved to Petronas Sprinta Racing, replacing Khairul Idham Pawi, who returned to Moto3.
- Marcos Ramírez moved up to Moto2, joining American Racing Team to replace Iker Lecuona, who moved up to MotoGP.
- Hafizh Syahrin returned to Moto2 after two seasons with Tech3 in MotoGP, joining Aspar Team.
- Andi Farid Izdihar replaced Dimas Ekky Pratama at Idemitsu Honda Team Asia.
- Edgar Pons returned to Moto2 full-time, joining Federal Oil Gresini Racing.
- Simone Corsi returned to MV Agusta Forward Racing, replacing Dominique Aegerter who moved to MotoE. Previously Corsi had raced for Forward Racing between 2013 and 2015.
- Kasma Daniel made his debut in Moto2, joining Onexox TKKR SAG Team from FIM CEV Moto2.
- Augusto Fernández moved from Pons Racing to fill the empty seat at Marc VDS after Álex Márquez's promotion to MotoGP with Repsol Honda. His seat at Pons Racing was filled by Héctor Garzó.

==== Mid-season changes ====
- Dominique Aegerter replaced Jesko Raffin at NTS RW Racing GP for three races while Raffin recovered from fatigue.
- Alejandro Medina replaced Hafizh Syahrin at Aspar Team Moto2 for the Styrian Grand Prix after Syahrin sustained injuries in a crash at the previous round.
- Jorge Martín missed both Misano rounds due to him testing positive for COVID-19. He was replaced by Mattia Pasini for the second round.
- Xavier Cardelús replaced Arón Canet at Aspar Team Moto2 for the Aragón and Teruel Grands Prix after Canet sustained injuries in a crash at the French round.

== Calendar ==
The following Grands Prix are scheduled to take place in 2020:

Round	Date	Grand Prix	Circuit
1	8 March (Note: Night race)	QNB Grand Prix of Qatar	Lusail International Circuit, Lusail
2	19 July	(Spain) Gran Premio Red Bull de España	Circuito de Jerez, Jerez de la Frontera
3	26 July	(Andalusia) Gran Premio Red Bull de Andalucía	Circuito de Jerez, Jerez de la Frontera
4	9 August	(Czech Republic) Monster Energy Grand Prix České republiky	Brno Circuit, Brno
5	16 August	(Austria) myWorld Motorrad Grand Prix von Österreich	Red Bull Ring, Spielberg
6	23 August	BMW M Grand Prix of Styria	Red Bull Ring, Spielberg
7	13 September	Gran Premio Lenovo di San Marino e della Riviera di Rimini	Misano World Circuit, Misano Adriatico
8	20 September	(Emilia-Romagna) Gran Premio Tissot dell'Emilia Romagna e della Riviera di Rimini	Misano World Circuit, Misano Adriatico
9	27 September	(Catalonia) Gran Premi Monster Energy de Catalunya	Circuit de Barcelona-Catalunya, Montmeló
10	11 October	Shark Helmets Grand Prix de France	Bugatti Circuit, Le Mans
11	18 October	(Aragon) Gran Premio Michelin de Aragón	MotorLand Aragón, Alcañiz
12	25 October	(Province of Teruel) Gran Premio Liqui Moly de Teruel	MotorLand Aragón, Alcañiz
13	8 November	(Europe) Gran Premio de Europa	Circuit Ricardo Tormo, Valencia
14	15 November	(Valencian Community) Gran Premio Motul de la Comunitat Valenciana	Circuit Ricardo Tormo, Valencia
15	22 November	Grande Prémio MEO de Portugal	Algarve International Circuit, Portimão

=== Cancelled Grands Prix ===
The following rounds were included on the original calendar, but were cancelled in response to the COVID-19 pandemic:

Original Date	Grand Prix	Circuit
31 May	(Italy) Italian motorcycle Grand Prix	Mugello Circuit, Scarperia e San Piero
21 June	(Germany) German motorcycle Grand Prix	Sachsenring, Hohenstein-Ernstthal
28 June	(Netherlands) Dutch TT	TT Circuit Assen, Assen
12 July	(Finland) Finnish motorcycle Grand Prix	Kymi Ring, Iitti
30 August	(United Kingdom) British motorcycle Grand Prix	Silverstone Circuit, Silverstone
~~22 March~~; 4 October (Note: The Thailand Grand Prix was originally due to take place on 22 March but was initially rescheduled to 4 October due to the COVID-19 pandemic.)	Thailand motorcycle Grand Prix	Buriram International Circuit, Buriram
18 October	(Japan) Japanese motorcycle Grand Prix	Motegi Circuit, Motegi
25 October	(Australia) Australian motorcycle Grand Prix	Phillip Island Grand Prix Circuit, Phillip Island
1 November	(Malaysia) Malaysian motorcycle Grand Prix	Sepang International Circuit, Sepang
~~5 April~~; 15 November (Note: The Grand Prix of the Americas was originally due to take place on 5 April but was initially rescheduled to 15 November due to the COVID-19 pandemic.)	(United States) Motorcycle Grand Prix of the Americas	Circuit of the Americas, Austin
~~19 April~~; 22 November (Note: The Argentine Grand Prix was originally due to take place on 19 April but was initially rescheduled to 22 November due to the COVID-19 pandemic.)	(Argentina) Argentine Republic motorcycle Grand Prix	Autódromo Termas de Río Hondo, Termas de Río Hondo

=== Calendar changes ===
- The Thailand Grand Prix was moved from being the 15th round of 2019 to the 2nd round of 2020.
- The Argentine Republic Grand Prix and Grand Prix of the Americas swapped places in the calendar order.
- The German Grand Prix and Dutch TT also swapped places, with Germany moving to 21 June, while the Assen round remained in its traditional position on the final weekend of June.
- The Finnish Grand Prix was reintroduced to the calendar after a 38-year absence. The venue hosting the round will be the new Kymi Ring, instead of the Pyynikki Circuit used in 1962 and 1963 or the Imatra Circuit which hosted the round until 1982.
- The Aragon Grand Prix was moved from the last week of September to the first week of October. It was later returned to its original schedule to allow for the rescheduled Thailand Grand Prix.

=== Calendar changes as a reaction to COVID-19 pandemic ===
The season calendar has been significantly affected by the COVID-19 pandemic, leading to the cancellation or postponement of many races.

- The Qatar Grand Prix proceeded for Moto2 and Moto3 as planned despite cancellation of the premier class race, as the teams were already in Qatar for their final pre-season test before the quarantine measures were implemented.
- The Thailand Grand Prix was postponed on 2 March due to COVID-19 concerns. It was later planned to take place on 4 October, shifting the Aragon Grand Prix forward by a week.
- The Grand Prix of the Americas was postponed from 5 April to 15 November after the City of Austin implemented a state of emergency. The Valencian Grand Prix was subsequently shifted back by one week to 22 November to accommodate the Austin rescheduling.
- The Argentine Grand Prix was postponed to 22 November, further shifting the finale in Valencia to 29 November.
- The Spanish Grand Prix was postponed on 26 March.
- The French Grand Prix was postponed on 2 April.
- The Italian and Catalan Grands Prix were postponed on 7 April.
- The German Grand Prix was postponed on 17 April after the German government announced a ban of all large gatherings until at least 31 August.
- The Dutch TT was postponed on 23 April after the Dutch government announced a ban on all mass events until at least 1 September.
- The Finnish Grand Prix was postponed on 24 April.
- The German, Dutch, and Finnish rounds were officially cancelled on 29 April. For the first time in the championship's history, the Dutch TT was absent from the calendar.
- The British and Australian rounds were cancelled on 29 May.
- The Japanese round was cancelled on 1 June.
- The Italian round was officially cancelled on 10 June.
- On 11 June, a new schedule based in Europe was announced. The season is to contain 5 "double-headers" on consecutive weekends at Jerez, Austria, Misano, Aragon, and Valencia to achieve a minimum of 13 races.
- The European Grand Prix returned to the calendar for the first time since 1995, held at Circuit Ricardo Tormo as the first round of the Valencian double-header.
- The Grand Prix of the Americas was officially cancelled on 8 July.
- The Argentine, Thai, and Malaysian rounds were officially cancelled on 31 July.
- On 10 August, the Portuguese Grand Prix was announced to be staging the final race of the 2020 season at the Algarve International Circuit in Portimão. It will mark the first Portuguese Grand Prix since 2012 when it was held at the Circuito do Estoril. Portimão has been MotoGP's reserve track since 2017.

== Results and standings ==
=== Grands Prix ===
Round	Grand Prix	Pole position	Fastest lap	Winning rider	Winning team	Winning constructor	Report
1	Qatar motorcycle Grand Prix	(United States) Joe Roberts	(Japan) Tetsuta Nagashima	(Japan) Tetsuta Nagashima	(Finland) Red Bull KTM Ajo	(Germany) Kalex	Report
2	(Spain) Spanish motorcycle Grand Prix	(Spain) Jorge Martín	(Japan) Tetsuta Nagashima	(Italy) Luca Marini	(Italy) Sky Racing Team VR46	(Germany) Kalex	Report
3	(Andalusia) Andalusian motorcycle Grand Prix	(Italy) Marco Bezzecchi	(Italy) Enea Bastianini	(Italy) Enea Bastianini	(Italy) Italtrans Racing Team	(Germany) Kalex	Report
4	Czech Republic motorcycle Grand Prix	(United States) Joe Roberts	(Italy) Enea Bastianini	(Italy) Enea Bastianini	(Italy) Italtrans Racing Team	(Germany) Kalex	Report
5	(Austria) Austrian motorcycle Grand Prix	(Australia) Remy Gardner	(Spain) Jorge Martín	(Spain) Jorge Martín	(Finland) Red Bull KTM Ajo	(Germany) Kalex	Report
6	(Styria) Styrian motorcycle Grand Prix	(Spain) Arón Canet	(Italy) Marco Bezzecchi	(Italy) Marco Bezzecchi	(Italy) Sky Racing Team VR46	(Germany) Kalex	Report
7	San Marino and Rimini Riviera motorcycle Grand Prix	(United Kingdom) Sam Lowes (Note: Sam Lowes, who set the fastest time in qualifying, was required to start from the pit lane as a penalty for irresponsible riding during the previous race. As a result, Remy Gardner was due to start the race from pole position but was declared unfit to race after a crash in warm-up. Luca Marini ultimately inherited the pole position grid slot, although Lowes was still credited with pole position.)	(Italy) Luca Marini	(Italy) Luca Marini	(Italy) Sky Racing Team VR46	(Germany) Kalex	Report
8	(Emilia-Romagna) Emilia Romagna and Rimini Riviera motorcycle Grand Prix	(Italy) Luca Marini	(United Kingdom) Sam Lowes	(Italy) Enea Bastianini	(Italy) Italtrans Racing Team	(Germany) Kalex	Report
9	(Catalonia) Catalan motorcycle Grand Prix	(Italy) Luca Marini	(United Kingdom) Sam Lowes	(Italy) Luca Marini	(Italy) Sky Racing Team VR46	(Germany) Kalex	Report
10	(France) French motorcycle Grand Prix	(United States) Joe Roberts	(Spain) Augusto Fernández	(United Kingdom) Sam Lowes	(Belgium) EG 0,0 Marc VDS	(Germany) Kalex	Report
11	Aragon motorcycle Grand Prix	(United Kingdom) Sam Lowes	(Spain) Jorge Martín	(United Kingdom) Sam Lowes	(Belgium) EG 0,0 Marc VDS	(Germany) Kalex	Report
12	(Province of Teruel) Teruel motorcycle Grand Prix	(United Kingdom) Sam Lowes	(United Kingdom) Sam Lowes	(United Kingdom) Sam Lowes	(Belgium) EG 0,0 Marc VDS	(Germany) Kalex	Report
13	(Europe) European motorcycle Grand Prix	(Spain) Xavi Vierge	(Spain) Héctor Garzó	(Italy) Marco Bezzecchi	(Italy) Sky Racing Team VR46	(Germany) Kalex	Report
14	Valencian Community motorcycle Grand Prix	(Italy) Stefano Manzi	(Spain) Héctor Garzó	(Spain) Jorge Martín	(Finland) Red Bull KTM Ajo	(Germany) Kalex	Report
15	(Portugal) Portuguese motorcycle Grand Prix	(Australia) Remy Gardner	(Australia) Remy Gardner	(Australia) Remy Gardner	(Malaysia) Onexox TKKR SAG Team	(Germany) Kalex	Report

=== Riders' standings ===
Scoring system

Points were awarded to the top fifteen finishers. A rider had to finish the race to earn points.

Position	1st	2nd	3rd	4th	5th	6th	7th	8th	9th	10th	11th	12th	13th	14th	15th
Points	25	20	16	13	11	10	9	8	7	6	5	4	3	2	1

Pos.	Rider	Bike	Team	QAT (Qatar)	SPA (Spain)	ANC (Andalusia)	CZE (Czech Republic)	AUT (Austria)	STY (Styria)	RSM (San Marino)	EMI (Emilia-Romagna)	CAT (Catalonia)	FRA (France)	ARA (Aragon)	TER (Province of Teruel)	EUR (Europe)	VAL (Valencian Community)	POR (Portugal)	Pts
1	(Italy) Enea Bastianini	Kalex	Italtrans Racing Team	3	9	1^{F}	1^{F}	Ret	10	3	1	6	11	2	3	4	6	5	205
2	(Italy) Luca Marini	Kalex	Sky Racing Team VR46	Ret	1	2	4	2	7	1^{F}	4^{P}	1^{P}	17	Ret	11	6	5	2	196
3	(United Kingdom) Sam Lowes	Kalex	EG 0,0 Marc VDS	DNS	4	4	2	4	DSQ	8^{P}	3^{F}	2^{F}	1	1^{P}	1^{P F}	Ret	14	3	196
4	(Italy) Marco Bezzecchi	Kalex	Sky Racing Team VR46	12	Ret	3^{P}	6	6	1^{F}	2	2	7	3	Ret	Ret	1	3	4	184
5	(Spain) Jorge Martín	Kalex	Red Bull KTM Ajo	20	3^{P}	6	8	1^{F}	2			Ret	Ret	3^{F}	6	2	1	6	160
6	(Australia) Remy Gardner	Kalex	Onexox TKKR SAG Team	5	7	14	13	Ret^{P}	3	DNS		16	2	5	4	3	7	1^{P F}	135
7	(United States) Joe Roberts	Kalex	Tennor American Racing	4^{P}	17	17	3^{P}	10	12	10	Ret	5	6^{P}	8	10	Ret	11	7	94
8	(Japan) Tetsuta Nagashima	Kalex	Red Bull KTM Ajo	1^{F}	2^{F}	11	11	Ret	4	Ret	23	12	21	9	14	12	12	14	91
9	(Germany) Marcel Schrötter	Kalex	Liqui Moly Intact GP	7	Ret	10	15	3	11	Ret	5	10	10	15	20	13	4	12	81
10	(Spain) Xavi Vierge	Kalex	Petronas Sprinta Racing	9	10	8	12	5	6	4	Ret	Ret	Ret	16	12	9^{P}	13	10	79
11	(Switzerland) Thomas Lüthi	Kalex	Liqui Moly Intact GP	10	Ret	7	17	7	5	6	9	11	5	12	Ret	19	16	16	72
12	(Italy) Lorenzo Baldassarri	Kalex	Flexbox HP40	2	8	Ret	22	11	15	11	25	Ret	8	20	Ret	5	10	9	71
13	(Spain) Augusto Fernández	Kalex	EG 0,0 Marc VDS	Ret	13	13	5	8	Ret	5	18	Ret	4^{F}	11	8	DNS	15	8	71
14	(Spain) Arón Canet	Speed Up	Pull&Bear Aspar Team Moto2	8	5	5	10	9	Ret^{P}	9	13	8	DNS			11	Ret	15	67
15	(Italy) Fabio Di Giannantonio	Speed Up	Beta Tools Speed Up	13	Ret	18	16	21	18	7	8	3	7	Ret	2	Ret	Ret	Ret	65
16	(Spain) Héctor Garzó	Kalex	Flexbox HP40	17	12	Ret	Ret	15	9	Ret	10	13	12	7	Ret	7^{F}	2^{F}	Ret	63
17	(Spain) Jorge Navarro	Speed Up	Beta Tools Speed Up	6	Ret	Ret	7	Ret	Ret	Ret	7	4	Ret	27	5	10	Ret	Ret	58
18	(United Kingdom) Jake Dixon	Kalex	Petronas Sprinta Racing	14	18	Ret	Ret	14	8	16	6	Ret	Ret	4	7	DNS			44
19	(Spain) Marcos Ramírez	Kalex	Tennor American Racing	Ret	23	15	19	18	16	12	17	9	13	6	9	16	Ret	11	37
20	(Italy) Nicolò Bulega	Kalex	Federal Oil Gresini Moto2	18	14	12	14	16	13	15	11	Ret	Ret	18	17	8	9	Ret	32
21	(Malaysia) Hafizh Syahrin	Speed Up	Pull&Bear Aspar Team Moto2	19	6	Ret	9	Ret		Ret	19	18	15	19	13	Ret	19	21	21
22	(Italy) Stefano Manzi	MV Agusta	MV Agusta Forward Racing	15	11	9	Ret	17	14	17	15	Ret	14	14	Ret	15	Ret^{P}	19	21
23	(Netherlands) Bo Bendsneyder	NTS	NTS RW Racing GP	11	Ret	19	18	22	24	19	22	17	20	21	16	14	8	13	18
24	(Italy) Simone Corsi	MV Agusta	MV Agusta Forward Racing	21	15	Ret	DNS	20	20	14	12	15	16	10	15	Ret	17	Ret	15
25	(Thailand) Somkiat Chantra	Kalex	Idemitsu Honda Team Asia	25	Ret	Ret	23	13	Ret	18	21	Ret	9	23	19	Ret	18	18	10
26	(Spain) Edgar Pons	Kalex	Federal Oil Gresini Moto2	16	16	16	20	Ret	19	Ret	20	14	19	13	Ret	17	Ret	Ret	5
27	(Italy) Lorenzo Dalla Porta	Kalex	Italtrans Racing Team	24	19	Ret	24	19	17	13	14	Ret	18	17	18	20	Ret	17	5
28	(Switzerland) Dominique Aegerter	NTS	NTS RW Racing GP				21	12	Ret									20	4
29	(Italy) Mattia Pasini	Kalex	Red Bull KTM Ajo								16								0
30	(Indonesia) Andi Farid Izdihar	Kalex	Idemitsu Honda Team Asia	22	20	20	25	Ret	23	Ret	24	19	Ret	22	21	18	Ret	Ret	0
31	(Malaysia) Kasma Daniel	Kalex	Onexox TKKR SAG Team	Ret	22	Ret	Ret	23	21	20	Ret	20	DSQ	25	Ret	21	20	Ret	0
32	(Poland) Piotr Biesiekirski	NTS	NTS RW Racing GP								Ret	21	22	26	23	22	21		0
33	(Switzerland) Jesko Raffin	NTS	NTS RW Racing GP	23	21	DNS				Ret									0
34	(Andorra) Xavier Cardelús	Speed Up	Kipin Energy Aspar Team Moto2											24	22				0
35	(Spain) Alejandro Medina	Speed Up	Openbank Aspar Team						22										0
Pos.	Rider	Bike	Team	QAT (Qatar)	SPA (Spain)	ANC (Andalusia)	CZE (Czech Republic)	AUT (Austria)	STY (Styria)	RSM (San Marino)	EMI (Emilia-Romagna)	CAT (Catalonia)	FRA (France)	ARA (Aragon)	TER (Province of Teruel)	EUR (Europe)	VAL (Valencian Community)	POR (Portugal)	Pts

Race key
Colour	Result
Gold	Winner
Silver	2nd place
Bronze	3rd place
Green	Points finish
Blue	Non-points finish
Blue	Non-classified finish (NC)
Purple	Retired (Ret)
Red	Did not qualify (DNQ)
Black	Disqualified (DSQ)
White	Did not start (DNS)
White	Withdrew (WD)
White	Race cancelled (C)
Blank	Did not practice (DNP)
Blank	Excluded (EX)
Blank	Did not arrive (DNA)
Blank	Did not enter (empty cell)
Annotation	Meaning
P	Pole position
F	Fastest lap
Rider key
Colour	Meaning
Light blue	Rookie rider

=== Constructors' standings ===
Each constructor received the same number of points as their best placed rider in each race.

Pos.	Constructor	QAT (Qatar)	SPA (Spain)	ANC (Andalusia)	CZE (Czech Republic)	AUT (Austria)	STY (Styria)	RSM (San Marino)	EMI (Emilia-Romagna)	CAT (Catalonia)	FRA (France)	ARA (Aragon)	TER (Province of Teruel)	EUR (Europe)	VAL (Valencian Community)	POR (Portugal)	Pts
1	(Germany) Kalex	1	1	1	1	1	1	1	1	1	1	1	1	1	1	1	375
2	(Italy) Speed Up	6	5	5	7	9	18	7	7	3	7	19	2	10	19	15	118
3	(Italy) MV Agusta	15	11	9	Ret	17	14	14	12	15	14	10	15	15	17	19	32
4	(Japan) NTS	11	21	19	18	12	24	19	22	17	20	21	16	14	8	13	22
Pos.	Constructor	QAT (Qatar)	SPA (Spain)	ANC (Andalusia)	CZE (Czech Republic)	AUT (Austria)	STY (Styria)	RSM (San Marino)	EMI (Emilia-Romagna)	CAT (Catalonia)	FRA (France)	ARA (Aragon)	TER (Province of Teruel)	EUR (Europe)	VAL (Valencian Community)	POR (Portugal)	Pts

=== Teams' standings ===
The teams' standings were based on results obtained by regular and substitute riders.

Pos.	Team	Bike No.	QAT (Qatar)	SPA (Spain)	ANC (Andalusia)	CZE (Czech Republic)	AUT (Austria)	STY (Styria)	RSM (San Marino)	EMI (Emilia-Romagna)	CAT (Catalonia)	FRA (France)	ARA (Aragon)	TER (Province of Teruel)	EUR (Europe)	VAL (Valencian Community)	POR (Portugal)	Pts
1	(Italy) Sky Racing Team VR46	10	Ret	1	2	4	2	7	1^{F}	4^{P}	1^{P}	17	Ret	11	6	5	2	380
1	(Italy) Sky Racing Team VR46	72	12	Ret	3^{P}	6	6	1^{F}	2	2	7	3	Ret	Ret	1	3	4	380
2	(Belgium) EG 0,0 Marc VDS	22	DNS	4	4	2	4	DSQ	8^{P}	3^{F}	2^{F}	1	1^{P}	1^{P F}	Ret	14	3	267
2	(Belgium) EG 0,0 Marc VDS	37	Ret	13	13	5	8	Ret	5	18	Ret	4^{F}	11	8	DNS	15	8	267
3	(Finland) Red Bull KTM Ajo	45	1^{F}	2^{F}	11	11	Ret	4	Ret	23	12	21	9	14	12	12	14	251
3	(Finland) Red Bull KTM Ajo	54								16								251
3	(Finland) Red Bull KTM Ajo	88	20	3^{P}	6	8	1^{F}	2			Ret	Ret	3^{F}	6	2	1	6	251
4	(Italy) Italtrans Racing Team	19	24	19	Ret	24	19	17	13	14	Ret	18	17	18	20	Ret	17	210
4	(Italy) Italtrans Racing Team	33	3	9	1^{F}	1^{F}	Ret	10	3	1	6	11	2	3	4	6	5	210
5	(Germany) Liqui Moly Intact GP	12	10	Ret	7	17	7	5	6	9	11	5	12	Ret	19	16	16	153
5	(Germany) Liqui Moly Intact GP	23	7	Ret	10	15	3	11	Ret	5	10	10	15	20	13	4	12	153
6	(Malaysia) Onexox TKKR SAG Team	87	5	7	14	13	Ret^{P}	3	DNS		16	2	5	4	3	7	1^{P F}	135
6	(Malaysia) Onexox TKKR SAG Team	99	Ret	22	Ret	Ret	23	21	20	Ret	20	DSQ	25	Ret	21	20	Ret	135
7	(Spain) Flexbox HP 40	7	2	8	Ret	22	11	15	11	25	Ret	8	20	Ret	5	10	9	134
7	(Spain) Flexbox HP 40	40	17	12	Ret	Ret	15	9	Ret	10	13	12	7	Ret	7^{F}	2^{F}	Ret	134
8	(United States) Tennor American Racing	16	4^{P}	17	17	3^{P}	10	12	10	Ret	5	6^{P}	8	10	Ret	11	7	131
8	(United States) Tennor American Racing	42	Ret	23	15	19	18	16	12	17	9	13	6	9	16	Ret	11	131
9	(Italy) Beta Tools Speed Up	9	6	Ret	Ret	7	Ret	Ret	Ret	7	4	Ret	27	5	10	Ret	Ret	123
9	(Italy) Beta Tools Speed Up	21	13	Ret	18	16	21	18	7	8	3	7	Ret	2	Ret	Ret	Ret	123
10	(Malaysia) Petronas Sprinta Racing	96	14	18	Ret	Ret	14	8	16	6	Ret	Ret	4	7	DNS			123
10	(Malaysia) Petronas Sprinta Racing	97	9	10	8	12	5	6	4	Ret	Ret	Ret	16	12	9^{P}	13	10	123
11	(Spain) Pull&Bear Aspar Team Moto2	5						22										88
11	(Spain) Pull&Bear Aspar Team Moto2	18											24	22				88
11	(Spain) Pull&Bear Aspar Team Moto2	44	8	5	5	10	9	Ret^{P}	9	13	8	DNS			11	Ret	15	88
11	(Spain) Pull&Bear Aspar Team Moto2	55	19	6	Ret	9	Ret		Ret	19	18	15	19	13	Ret	19	21	88
12	(Italy) Federal Oil Gresini Moto2	11	18	14	12	14	16	13	15	11	Ret	Ret	18	17	8	9	Ret	37
12	(Italy) Federal Oil Gresini Moto2	57	16	16	16	20	Ret	19	Ret	20	14	19	13	Ret	17	Ret	Ret	37
13	(Switzerland) MV Agusta Forward Racing	24	21	15	Ret	DNS	20	20	14	12	15	16	10	15	Ret	17	Ret	36
13	(Switzerland) MV Agusta Forward Racing	62	15	11	9	Ret	17	14	17	15	Ret	14	14	Ret	15	Ret^{P}	19	36
14	(Netherlands) NTS RW Racing GP	2	23	21	DNS				Ret									22
14	(Netherlands) NTS RW Racing GP	64	11	Ret	19	18	22	24	19	22	17	20	21	16	14	8	13	22
14	(Netherlands) NTS RW Racing GP	74								Ret	21	22	26	23	22	21		22
14	(Netherlands) NTS RW Racing GP	77				21	12	Ret									20	22
15	(Japan) Idemitsu Honda Team Asia	27	22	20	20	25	Ret	23	Ret	24	19	Ret	22	21	18	Ret	Ret	10
15	(Japan) Idemitsu Honda Team Asia	35	25	Ret	Ret	23	13	Ret	18	21	Ret	9	23	19	Ret	18	18	10
Pos.	Team	Bike No.	QAT (Qatar)	SPA (Spain)	ANC (Andalusia)	CZE (Czech Republic)	AUT (Austria)	STY (Styria)	RSM (San Marino)	EMI (Emilia-Romagna)	CAT (Catalonia)	FRA (France)	ARA (Aragon)	TER (Province of Teruel)	EUR (Europe)	VAL (Valencian Community)	POR (Portugal)	Pts
