= 2020 MotoE World Cup =

2nd running of the MotoE World Cup

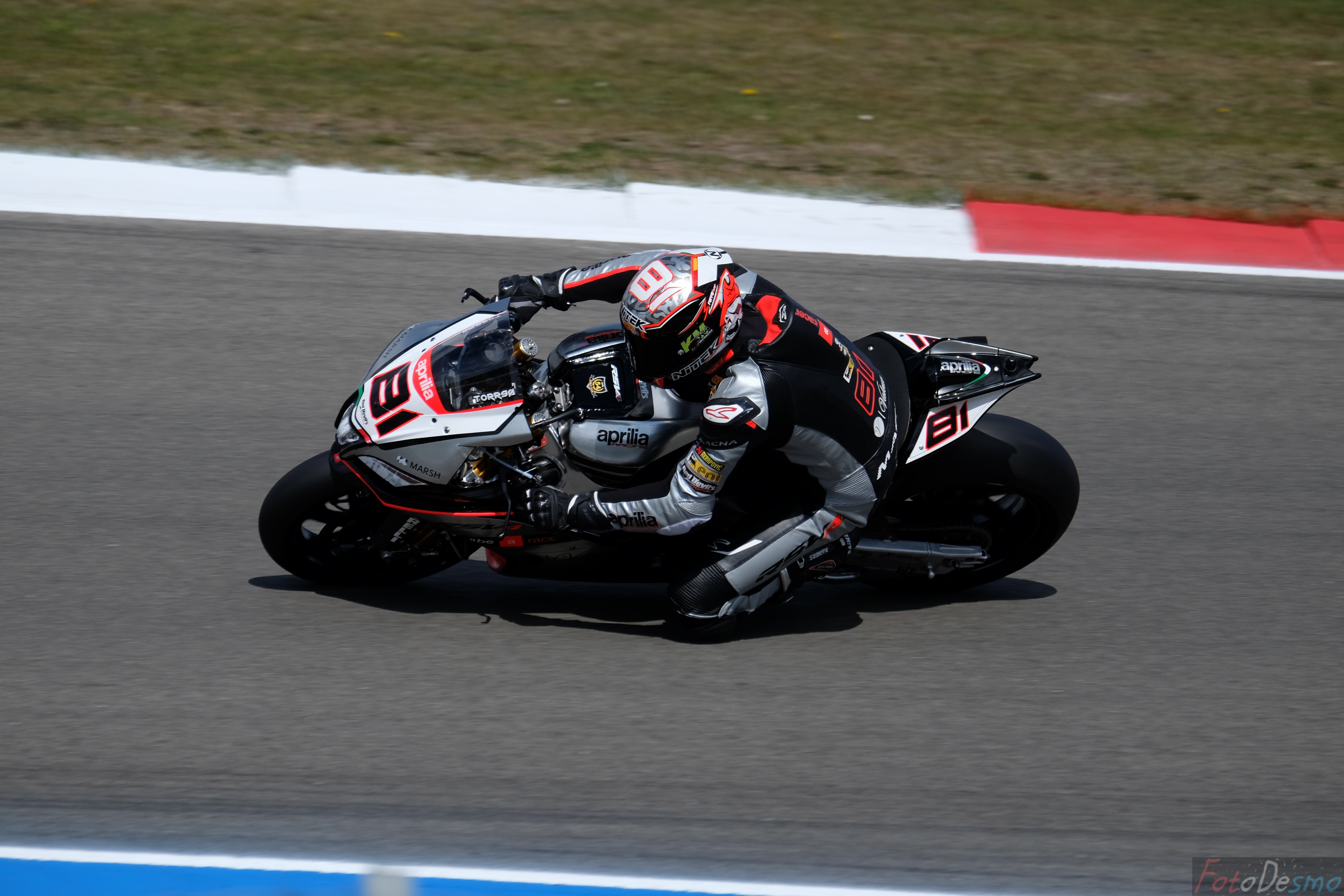
Jordi Torres (pictured in 2015) was the 2020 MotoE World Cup winner.

The 2020 MotoE World Cup (known officially as the 2020 FIM Enel MotoE World Cup for sponsorship reasons) was the second season of the MotoE World Cup for electric motorcycle racing, and was a support series of the 72nd Fédération Internationale de Motocyclisme (FIM) Road Racing World Championship season.

The season calendar was significantly affected by the COVID-19 pandemic, leading to the cancellation or postponement of many races and an overall delay to the start of the season.

The season champion was Jordi Torres in his first season in the electric class, after achieving four podium finishes (including one win) and never finishing outside of the top six. Runners-up Matteo Ferrari and Dominique Aegerter also tallied four podiums including two wins each, but retirements and poor finishes at the remaining races meant that they could not match Torres at the season's final race.

== Teams and riders ==
All teams used the series-specified Energica Ego Corsa.

Team	No.	Rider	Rounds
(Finland) Avant Ajo MotoE	66	(Finland) Niki Tuuli	All
(Spain) Avintia Esponsorama Racing	18	(Andorra) Xavier Cardelús	All
(Spain) Avintia Esponsorama Racing	51	(Brazil) Eric Granado	All
(Germany) Dynavolt Intact GP	77	(Switzerland) Dominique Aegerter	All
(Belgium) EG 0,0 Marc VDS	63	(France) Mike Di Meglio	All
(Monaco) LCR E-Team	7	(Italy) Niccolò Canepa	All
(Monaco) LCR E-Team	10	(Belgium) Xavier Siméon	All
(Spain) Pons Racing 40	40	(Spain) Jordi Torres	All
(Italy) OCTO Pramac MotoE	15	(San Marino) Alex de Angelis	All
(Italy) OCTO Pramac MotoE	16	(Australia) Joshua Hook	All
(Italy) Ongetta SIC58 Squadra Corse	27	(Italy) Mattia Casadei	All
(Spain) Openbank Aspar Team	6	(Spain) María Herrera	All
(Spain) Openbank Aspar Team	55	(Spain) Alejandro Medina	All
(France) Tech3 E-Racing	35	(Germany) Lukas Tulovic	All
(France) Tech3 E-Racing	70	(Italy) Tommaso Marcon	All
(Italy) TRENTINO Gresini MotoE	11	(Italy) Matteo Ferrari	All
(Italy) TRENTINO Gresini MotoE	61	(Italy) Alessandro Zaccone	All
(Malaysia) WithU Motorsport	84	(Czech Republic) Jakub Kornfeil	All

Key
Regular rider
Replacement rider

=== Rider changes ===
- Xavier Cardelús joined Avintia Esponsorama Racing to replace Xavier Siméon, who moved to LCR E-Team replacing Randy de Puniet.
- Dominique Aegerter made his MotoE debut with Dynavolt Intact GP replacing Jesko Raffin, who returned to a full-time entry in Moto2.
- Jordi Torres replaced Sete Gibernau at Pons Racing 40.
- Alejandro Medina joined Openbank Aspar Team to replace Nicolás Terol.
- Lukas Tulovic and Tommaso Marcon replaced Kenny Foray and Héctor Garzó at Tech3 E-Racing.
- Alessandro Zaccone replaced compatriot Lorenzo Savadori at Trentino Gresini MotoE.
- Jakub Kornfeil replaced Bradley Smith at WithU Motorsport shortly before the season start, as Smith returned to MotoGP to replace the suspended Andrea Iannone at Aprilia Gresini.

== Regulation changes ==
In case two races are held in the same weekend, the E-Pole qualifying session determines the starting grid for Race 1, while the grid for Race 2 features the riders in the order they have finished Race 1, followed by the non-classified riders sorted by qualifying time. Previously, both races were run with the same starting grid, based on E-Pole results. Only the pole rider of the first race of a weekend is credited with a pole position; the polesitter for the second race is not officially recorded for the rider.

== Calendar ==
The MotoE provisional calendar, released in September 2019, featured six races in five venues, supporting the Spanish, French, Dutch, Austrian, and San Marino Grands Prix—the latter being a double-header; an additional race was added in December 2019, when a double-header in Valencia replaced the single French race.

As a revised schedule was released in June 2020 in response to the COVID-19 pandemic, the following Grands Prix took place in 2020.

Round	Date	Grand Prix	Circuit
1	19 July	(Spain) Gran Premio Red Bull de España	Circuito de Jerez, Jerez de la Frontera
2	26 July	(Andalusia) Gran Premio Red Bull de Andalucía	Circuito de Jerez, Jerez de la Frontera
3	13 September	Gran Premio Lenovo di San Marino e della Riviera di Rimini	Misano World Circuit, Misano Adriatico
4	19 September	(Emilia-Romagna) Gran Premio Tissot dell'Emilia Romagna e della Riviera di Rimini	Misano World Circuit, Misano Adriatico
4	20 September	(Emilia-Romagna) Gran Premio Tissot dell'Emilia Romagna e della Riviera di Rimini	Misano World Circuit, Misano Adriatico
5	10 October	Shark Helmets Grand Prix de France	Bugatti Circuit, Le Mans
5	11 October	Shark Helmets Grand Prix de France	Bugatti Circuit, Le Mans

=== Cancelled Grands Prix ===
The following rounds were cancelled or were removed from the updated MotoE schedule in response to the COVID-19 pandemic:

Original date	Grand Prix	Circuit
Cancelled event
28 June	(Netherlands) Dutch TT	TT Circuit Assen, Assen
Confirmed events, removed from MotoE schedule
16 August	(Austria) Austrian motorcycle Grand Prix	Red Bull Ring, Spielberg
14 November	Valencian Community motorcycle Grand Prix	Circuit Ricardo Tormo, Valencia
15 November	Valencian Community motorcycle Grand Prix	Circuit Ricardo Tormo, Valencia

=== Calendar changes as a reaction to coronavirus pandemic ===
The season calendar was significantly affected by the COVID-19 pandemic, leading to the cancellation or postponement of many races and an overall delay to the start of the season.

- The Spanish Grand Prix, due to be held on 3 May, was postponed on 26 March. Its date was later set to 19 July.
- The Dutch TT was postponed on 23 April after the Dutch government announced a ban on all mass events until at least 1 September. It was subsequently cancelled on 29 April.
- The Austrian and Valencian Community Grand Prix, which were confirmed on the overall MotoGP calendar, were not part of the revised MotoE schedule.
- The San Marino Grand Prix, which was due to host a double-header round, became a single-header event. A double-header to be held at the same track was added for the following week, as part of the Emilia Romagna Grand Prix.
- A second event at Jerez, named after Andalusia, and a double-header at the French Grand Prix, were also added to the revised schedule.

== Results and standings ==
=== Grands Prix ===
Round	Grand Prix	Pole position	Fastest lap	Winning rider	Winning team	Report
1	(Spain) Spanish motorcycle Grand Prix	(Brazil) Eric Granado	(Brazil) Eric Granado	(Brazil) Eric Granado	(Spain) Avintia Esponsorama Racing	Report
2	(Andalusia) Andalusian motorcycle Grand Prix	(Switzerland) Dominique Aegerter	(Brazil) Eric Granado	(Switzerland) Dominique Aegerter	(Germany) Dynavolt Intact GP	Report
3	San Marino and Rimini Riviera motorcycle Grand Prix	(Italy) Matteo Ferrari (Note: Matteo Ferrari, who set the fastest time in qualifying, was given a 3-place grid penalty for irresponsible riding during the previous race. Mattia Casadei started the race from pole position, although Ferrari was still credited with pole position.)	(Switzerland) Dominique Aegerter	(Italy) Matteo Ferrari	(Italy) Trentino Gresini MotoE	Report
4	(Emilia-Romagna) Emilia Romagna and Rimini Riviera motorcycle Grand Prix	(Spain) Jordi Torres	(San Marino) Alex de Angelis	(Switzerland) Dominique Aegerter	(Germany) Dynavolt Intact GP	Report
4	(Emilia-Romagna) Emilia Romagna and Rimini Riviera motorcycle Grand Prix		(Spain) Jordi Torres	(Italy) Matteo Ferrari	(Italy) Trentino Gresini MotoE	Report
5	(France) French motorcycle Grand Prix	(Spain) Jordi Torres	(Finland) Niki Tuuli	(Spain) Jordi Torres	(Spain) Pons Racing 40	Report
5	(France) French motorcycle Grand Prix		(Finland) Niki Tuuli	(Finland) Niki Tuuli	(Finland) Avant Ajo MotoE	Report

=== Cup standings ===
Scoring system

Points were awarded to the top fifteen finishers. A rider had to finish the race to earn points.

Position	1st	2nd	3rd	4th	5th	6th	7th	8th	9th	10th	11th	12th	13th	14th	15th
Points	25	20	16	13	11	10	9	8	7	6	5	4	3	2	1

Pos.	Rider	SPA (Spain)	ANC (Andalusia)	RSM (San Marino)	EMI (Emilia-Romagna)		FRA (France)		Pts
1	(Spain) Jordi Torres	6	2	4	2^{P}	3^{F}	1^{P}	6	114
2	(Italy) Matteo Ferrari	2	Ret	1^{P}	3	1	Ret	5	97
3	(Switzerland) Dominique Aegerter	3	1^{P}	3^{F}	1	16	14	4	97
4	(France) Mike Di Meglio	10	7	6	Ret	6	2	2	75
5	(Italy) Mattia Casadei	5	3	5	4	2	Ret	13	74
6	(Finland) Niki Tuuli	11	DNS	17	13	12	3^{F}	1^{F}	53
7	(Brazil) Eric Granado	1^{P F}	13^{F}	10	Ret	7	6	Ret	53
8	(Australia) Joshua Hook	9	8	18	8	Ret	4	3	52
9	(Italy) Niccolò Canepa	13	5	11	6	4	Ret	7	51
10	(Belgium) Xavier Siméon	8	9	2	Ret	14	Ret	8	45
11	(Germany) Lukas Tulovic	4	6	12	Ret	15	10	11	39
12	(Italy) Alessandro Zaccone	WD	Ret	7	10	5	9	12	37
13	(Spain) Alejandro Medina	7	Ret	13	7	9	8	Ret	36
14	(San Marino) Alex de Angelis	17	4	8	Ret^{F}	8	12	14	35
15	(Andorra) Xavier Cardelús	14	10	14	9	10	11	10	34
16	(Italy) Tommaso Marcon	12	Ret	9	5	Ret	5	Ret	33
17	(Spain) María Herrera	15	11	15	11	11	7	9	33
18	(Czech Republic) Jakub Kornfeil	16	12	16	12	13	13	15	15
Pos.	Rider	SPA (Spain)	ANC (Andalusia)	RSM (San Marino)	EMI (Emilia-Romagna)		FRA (France)		Pts

Race key
Colour	Result
Gold	Winner
Silver	2nd place
Bronze	3rd place
Green	Points finish
Blue	Non-points finish
Blue	Non-classified finish (NC)
Purple	Retired (Ret)
Red	Did not qualify (DNQ)
Black	Disqualified (DSQ)
White	Did not start (DNS)
White	Withdrew (WD)
White	Race cancelled (C)
Blank	Did not practice (DNP)
Blank	Excluded (EX)
Blank	Did not arrive (DNA)
Blank	Did not enter (empty cell)
Annotation	Meaning
P	Pole position
F	Fastest lap
Rider key
Colour	Meaning
Light blue	Rookie rider
