= Alejandro Medina =

Spanish Grand Prix motorcycle road racer

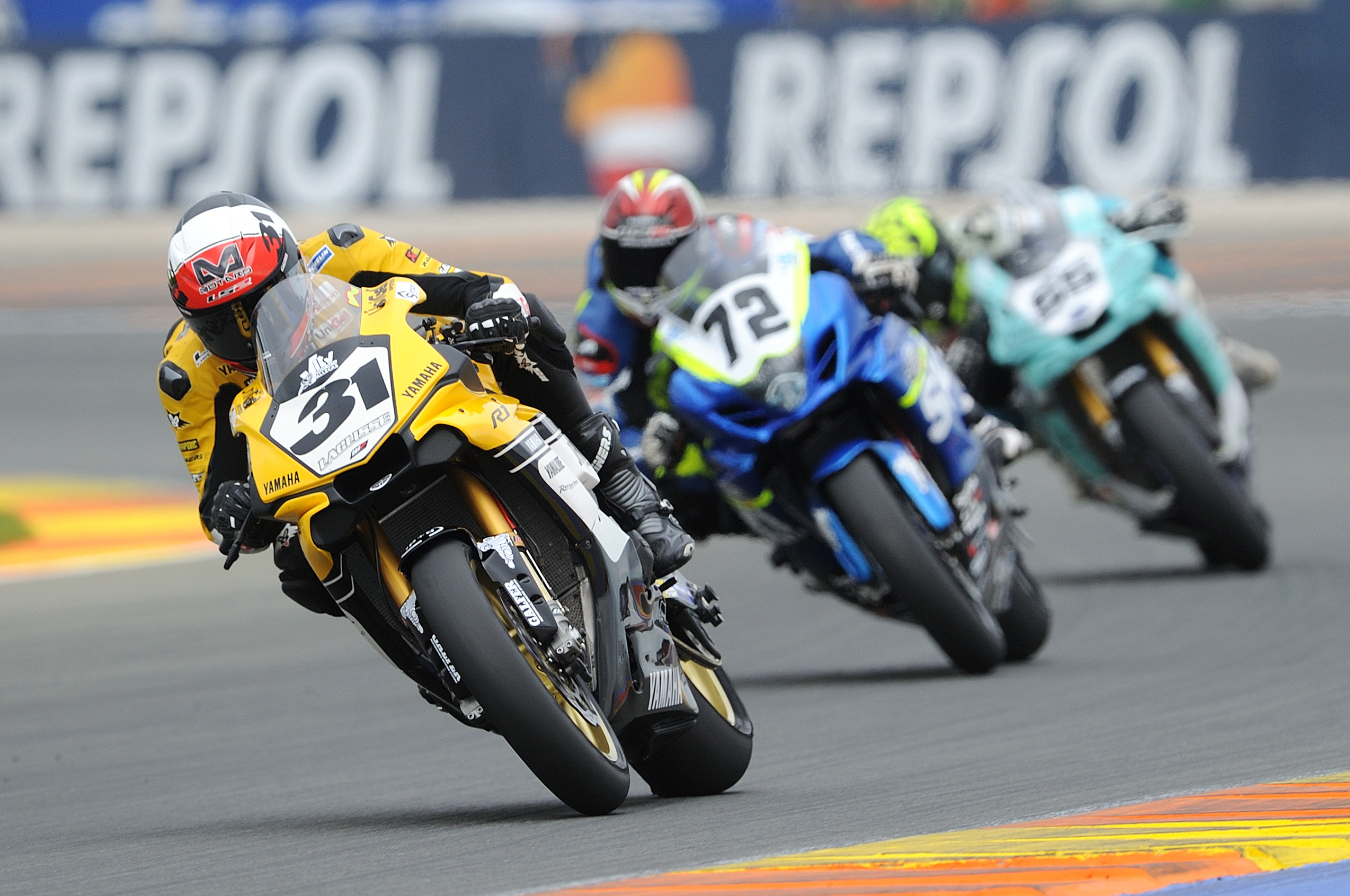
- Nationality: Spanish
- Born: 2 January 1997 (age 29); Málaga, Spain
- Current team: Aspar Team
- Bike number: 5
Motorcycle racing career statistics
Moto2 World Championship
Active years	2018, 2020
Manufacturers	Kalex, Speed Up
Championships	0
2020 championship position	35th (0 pts)
Starts / Wins / Podiums / Poles / F. laps / Points; 3 / 0 / 0 / 0 / 0 / 0
MotoE World Championship
Active years	2020
Manufacturers	Energica
2020 championship position	13th (36 pts)
Starts / Wins / Podiums / Poles / F. laps / Points; 7 / 0 / 0 / 0 / 0 / 36

Alejandro Medina Mayo (born 2 January 1997) is a Spanish motorcycle racer. He has competed in the MotoE World Cup and the Moto2 World Championship.

== Career statistics ==
=== Career highlights ===
- 2016 - 1st, Spanish Under-23 Superstock 1000 Championship
- 2017 - NC, European Superstock 1000 Championship, Yamaha YZF-R1
- 2019 - 3rd, Spanish Superbike Championship

=== CEV Moto3 Championship ===
==== Races by year ====
(key) (Races in bold indicate pole position, races in italics indicate fastest lap)

Year	Bike	1	2	3	4	5	6	7	Pos	Pts
2012	Honda	JER; 2	NAV; Ret	ARA; 27	CAT; 13	ALB1; 8	ALB2; Ret	VAL; 14	13th	33

=== FIM CEV Moto2 European Championship ===
==== Races by year ====
(key) (Races in bold indicate pole position; races in italics indicate fastest lap)

Year	Bike	1	2	3	4	5	6	7	8	9	10	11	Pos	Pts
2014	Ariane	JER	ARA1; 22	ARA2; Ret	CAT; 12	ALB; Ret	NAV1; 11	NAV2; 7	ALG1; 13	ALG2; 5	VAL; Ret		17th	32
2015	Ariane	ALG1; 8	ALG2; 7	CAT; 6	ARA1; 11	ARA2; 9	ALB; 6	NAV1; 6	NAV2; 9	JER	VAL1; 15	VAL2; Ret	8th	67
2020	Kalex	EST1; 6	EST2; 4	POR1; 4	POR2; 4	JER1; 5	JER2; 3	ARA1; 5	ARA2; Ret	ARA3; 5	VAL1	VAL2	5th	98

=== European Superstock 1000 Championship ===
==== Races by year ====
(key) (Races in bold indicate pole position) (Races in italics indicate fastest lap)

Year	Bike	1	2	3	4	5	6	7	8	9	Pos	Pts
2017	Yamaha	ARA	NED	IMO	DON	MIS	LAU	ALG	MAG	JER; 24	NC	0

=== Grand Prix motorcycle racing ===
==== By season ====
Season	Class	Team	Motorcycle	Race	Win	Podium	Pole	FLap	Pts	Plcd
2018	Moto2	SAG Team	Kalex	2	0	0	0	0	0	42nd
2020	MotoE	Openbank Aspar Team	Energica	7	0	0	0	0	36	13th
2020	Moto2	Openbank Aspar Team	Speed Up	1	0	0	0	0	0	35th
Total				**10**	**0**	**0**	**0**	**0**	**36**	

==== By class ====
Class	Seasons	1st GP	1st Pod	1st Win	Race	Win	Podiums	Pole	FLap	Pts	WChmp
Moto2	2018–2020	2018 Czech Republic			3	0	0	0	0	0	0
MotoE	2020	2020 Spain			7	0	0	0	0	36	0
Total	2018–Present				**10**	**0**	**0**	**0**	**0**	**36**	**0**

==== Races by year ====
(key) (Races in bold indicate pole position; races in italics indicate fastest lap)

Year	Class	Bike	1	2	3	4	5	6	7	8	9	10	11	12	13	14	15	16	17	18	19	Pos	Pts
2018	Moto2	Kalex	QAT	ARG	AME	SPA	FRA	ITA	CAT	NED	GER	CZE; Ret	AUT; 24	GBR; C	RSM	ARA	THA	JPN	AUS	MAL	VAL	42nd	0
2020	MotoE	Energica	SPA; 7	ANC; Ret	RSM; 13	EMI1; 7	EMI2; 9	FRA1; 8	FRA2; Ret													13th	36
2020	Moto2	Speed Up	QAT	SPA	ANC	CZE	AUT	STY; 22	RSM	EMI	CAT	FRA	ARA	TER	EUR	VAL	POR					35th	0
