= Xavier Siméon =

Belgian motorcycle racer

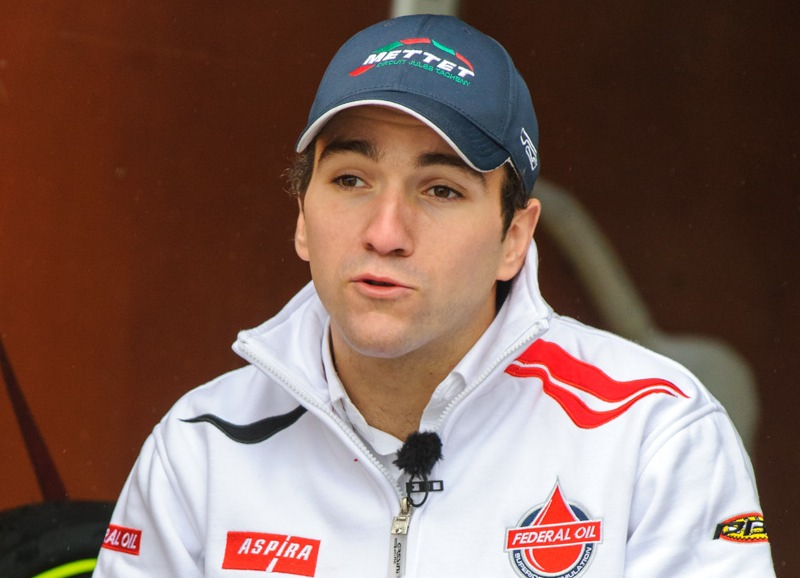
- Simeon in 2013
- Nationality: Belgian
- Born: 31 August 1989 (age 37); Brussels, Belgium
- Current team: Team LCR
- Bike number: 10
Motorcycle racing career statistics
MotoGP World Championship
Active years	2018
Manufacturers	Ducati
Championships	0
2018 championship position	27th (1 pt)
Starts / Wins / Podiums / Poles / F. laps / Points; 17 / 0 / 0 / 0 / 0 / 1
Moto2 World Championship
Active years	2010–2017
Manufacturers	Moriwaki, Tech 3, Kalex, Suter, Speed Up
Championships	0
2017 championship position	23rd (16 pts)
Starts / Wins / Podiums / Poles / F. laps / Points; 127 / 1 / 4 / 2 / 1 / 384
MotoE World Championship
Active years	2019–2020
Manufacturers	Energica
Championships	0
2020 championship position	10th (45 pts)
Starts / Wins / Podiums / Poles / F. laps / Points; 13 / 0 / 3 / 0 / 0 / 103

Xavier Siméon (born 31 August 1989) is a motorcycle racer from Belgium. He is a two-time champion in the FIM Endurance World Championship, winning it in 2019–20 with team-mates Gregg Black and Etienne Masson, and in 2021 with team-mates Gregg Black and Sylvain Guintoli, both times riding for Suzuki Endurance Racing Team on a Suzuki GSX-R1000. Siméon is also champion of the 2009 FIM Superstock 1000 Cup, and the 2006 European Superstock 600 Championship, as well as the winner of the 2021 24 Hours Moto of Le Mans endurance race.

In Grand Prix racing, Siméon competed between 2010 and 2018. At the 2013 French Grand Prix, he became the first Belgian rider since Didier de Radiguès in 1990 to take a podium finish, when he finished third behind Marc VDS Racing Team riders Scott Redding and Mika Kallio. Later in the season, Siméon took pole position for the German Grand Prix, the first such result for a Belgian since de Radiguès in 1989. Two years later, Siméon achieved his first victory at the 2015 German Grand Prix at the Sachsenring. In doing so, he became only the third Belgian rider to win a motorcycle Grand Prix, after de Radiguès and Julien Vanzeebroeck. Siméon had one season in the premier class, riding for Esponsorama Racing in 2018, but scored only one point throughout the year. He joined MotoE for the 2019 and 2020 championships.

== Career statistics ==
- 2005 - 5th, European Superstock 600 Championship, Suzuki GSX-R600RR
- 2006 - 1st, European Superstock 600 Championship, Suzuki GSX-R600
- 2008 - 4th, FIM Superstock 1000 Cup, Suzuki
- 2009 - 1st, FIM Superstock 1000 Cup, Ducati 1098

=== European Superstock 600 ===
==== Races by year ====
(key) (Races in bold indicate pole position, races in italics indicate fastest lap)

Year	Bike	1	2	3	4	5	6	7	8	9	10	Pos	Pts
2005	Suzuki	VAL; 3	MNZ; 5	SIL; Ret	MIS; Ret	BRN; Ret	BRA; 4	ASS; 4	LAU; 3	IMO; 4	MAG; 4	4th	105
2006	Suzuki	VAL; 1	MNZ; 1	SIL; 2	MIS; 2	BRN; 1	BRA; 1	ASS; 2	LAU; 3	IMO; 2	MAG; 1	1st	221

=== FIM Superstock 1000 Cup ===
==== Races by year ====
(key) (Races in bold indicate pole position) (Races in italics indicate fastest lap)

Year	Bike	1	2	3	4	5	6	7	8	9	10	11	Pos	Pts
2007	Suzuki	DON; 7	VAL; 6	NED; 8	MNZ; 5	SIL; 4	SMR; 2	BRN; 1	BRA; 2	LAU; 5	ITA; 5	MAG; Ret	4th	138
2008	Suzuki	VAL; 3	NED; 3	MNZ; 1	NŰR; 3	SMR; 5	BRN; 5	BRA; DNS	DON; 1	MAG; 5	ALG; 11		4th	136
2009	Ducati	VAL; 2	NED; 2	MNZ; 2	SMR; 2	DON; 1	BRN; 1	NŰR; 1	IMO; 1	MAG; 2	ALG; 1		1st	225

=== Grand Prix motorcycle racing ===
==== By season ====
Season	Class	Motorcycle	Team	Number	Race	Win	Podium	Pole	FLap	Pts	Plcd
2010	Moto2	Moriwaki MD600	Holiday Gym G22	19	10	0	0	0	0	10	30th
2011	Moto2	Tech 3 Mistral 610	Tech 3 B	19	17	0	0	0	0	23	26th
2012	Moto2	Tech 3 Mistral 610	Tech 3 Racing	19	15	0	0	0	0	23	21st
2013	Moto2	Kalex Moto2 2012	Maptaq SAG Team Zelos	19	17	0	1	1	0	90	12th
2014	Moto2	Suter MMX2	Federal Oil Gresini Moto2	19	18	0	1	0	0	63	14th
2015	Moto2	Kalex Moto2	Federal Oil Gresini Moto2	19	18	1	2	1	0	113	7th
2016	Moto2	Speed Up SF16	QMMF Racing Team	19	17	0	0	0	1	46	17th
2017	Moto2	Kalex Moto2	Tasca Racing Scuderia Moto2	19	15	0	0	0	0	16	23rd
2018	MotoGP	Ducati Desmosedici GP16	Reale Avintia Racing	10	17	0	0	0	0	1	27th
2018	MotoGP	Ducati Desmosedici GP17	Reale Avintia Racing	10	17	0	0	0	0	1	27th
2019	MotoE	Energica Ego Corsa	Avintia Esponsorama Racing	10	6	0	2	0	0	58	6th
2020	MotoE	Energica Ego Corsa	LCR E-Team	10	7	0	1	0	0	45	10th
Total					**157**	**1**	**7**	**2**	**1**	**488**	

==== By class ====
Class	Seasons	1st GP	1st Pod	1st Win	Race	Win	Podiums	Pole	FLap	Pts	WChmp
Moto2	2010–2017	2010 France	2013 France	2015 Germany	127	1	4	2	1	384	0
MotoGP	2018	2018 Qatar			17	0	0	0	0	1	0
MotoE	2019–2020	2019 Germany	2019 Austria		13	0	3	0	0	103	0
Total	2010–2020				**157**	**1**	**7**	**2**	**1**	**488**	**0**

==== Races by year ====
(key) (Races in bold indicate pole position, races in italics indicate fastest lap)

Year	Class	Bike	1	2	3	4	5	6	7	8	9	10	11	12	13	14	15	16	17	18	19	Pos	Pts
2010	Moto2	Moriwaki	QAT	SPA	FRA; Ret	ITA; 19	GBR; 8	NED; Ret	CAT; 24	GER; 15	CZE; 19	INP	RSM; 19	ARA	JPN	MAL	AUS	POR; 23	VAL; 15			30th	10
2011	Moto2	Tech 3	QAT; 25	SPA; 19	POR; 26	FRA; 18	CAT; 14	GBR; Ret	NED; Ret	ITA; 12	GER; 18	CZE; 23	INP; 13	RSM; Ret	ARA; 18	JPN; 11	AUS; Ret	MAL; 15	VAL; 8			26th	23
2012	Moto2	Tech 3	QAT; 17	SPA; 13	POR; 13	FRA; DNS	CAT	GBR; 21	NED; 13	GER; 8	ITA; Ret	INP; Ret	CZE; Ret	RSM; Ret	ARA; Ret	JPN; 13	MAL; Ret	AUS; 13	VAL; 27			21st	23
2013	Moto2	Kalex	QAT; 10	AME; 12	SPA; 6	FRA; 3	ITA; Ret	CAT; Ret	NED; 7	**GER**; 8	INP; 9	CZE; 11	GBR; Ret	RSM; 8	ARA; Ret	MAL; Ret	AUS; Ret	JPN; 4	VAL; 12			12th	90
2014	Moto2	Suter	QAT; 24	AME; Ret	ARG; 2	SPA; 7	FRA; Ret	ITA; 14	CAT; Ret	NED; 25	GER; 10	INP; Ret	CZE; 14	GBR; Ret	RSM; 16	ARA; Ret	JPN; 10	AUS; 9	MAL; 19	VAL; 5		14th	63
2015	Moto2	Kalex	QAT; 2	**AME**; Ret	ARG; 22	SPA; 5	FRA; 8	ITA; 6	CAT; Ret	NED; 6	GER; 1	INP; 8	CZE; 16	GBR; 25	RSM; 12	ARA; Ret	JPN; Ret	AUS; 5	MAL; 10	VAL; 16		7th	113
2016	Moto2	Speed Up	QAT; Ret	ARG; 12	AME; 8	SPA; 10	FRA; 11	ITA; DNS	CAT; Ret	NED; 11	GER; Ret	AUT; 23	CZE; 15	GBR; 16	RSM; Ret	ARA; 11	JPN; 10	AUS; 11	MAL; 15	VAL; 16		17th	46
2017	Moto2	Kalex	QAT; 15	ARG; Ret	AME; 13	SPA; 19	FRA; 16	ITA; 15	CAT; 20	NED; 7	GER; 14	CZE; 23	AUT; Ret	GBR	RSM; Ret	ARA; 25	JPN; Ret	AUS; DNS	MAL	VAL; Ret		23rd	16
2018	MotoGP	Ducati	QAT; 21	ARG; 21	AME; 20	SPA; 17	FRA; 18	ITA; 17	CAT; Ret	NED; Ret	GER; 19	CZE; 20	AUT; Ret	GBR; C	RSM; Ret	ARA; 19	THA; 18	JPN; 16	AUS; 15	MAL; 17	VAL; DNS	27th	1
2019	MotoE	Energica	GER; 7	AUT; 2	RSM1; 3	RSM2; Ret	VAL1; 4	VAL2; Ret														6th	58
2020	MotoE	Energica	SPA; 8	ANC; 9	RSM; 2	EMI1; Ret	EMI2; 14	FRA1; Ret	FRA2; 8													10th	45

=== FIM EWC ===
==== By year ====
(key) (Races in bold indicate pole position; races in italics indicate fastest lap)

Year	Bike	(France) LE MANS				(Portugal) ESTORIL			(France) BOL D'OR				(Czech Republic) MOST		Pos	Pts
Year	Bike	Grid	8 Hrs	16 Hrs	24 Hrs	Grid	8 Hrs	12 Hrs	Grid	8 Hrs	16 Hrs	24 Hrs	Grid	6 Hrs	Pos	Pts
2021	Suzuki GSX-R 1000R	4	10	10	40	3	0	9	5	10	10	40	3	31,5	1st	175,5

==== By team ====
Year	Team	Bike	Rider	TC
2019–20	(France) Suzuki Endurance Racing Team	Suzuki GSX-R1000	(France) Étienne Masson (France) Gregg Black (Belgium) Xavier Siméon (France) Vincent Philippe	1st
2021	(France) Yoshimura Suzuki Endurance Racing Team	Suzuki GSX-R1000	(France) Gregg Blaxk (France) Sylvain Guintoli (Belgium) Xavier Siméon	1st
2022	(Japan) Yoshimura Suzuki Endurance Racing Team	Suzuki GSX-R1000	(France) Gregg Blaxk (France) Sylvain Guintoli (Belgium) Xavier Siméon (Japan) Kazuki Watanabe	2nd
