= Xavier Cardelús =

Andorran motorcycle racer (born 1998)

- Cardelús in 2018
- Born: 15 May 1998 (age 28); Andorra la Vella, Andorra
- Current team: Cerba Yamaha Racing Team
- Bike number: 20
Motorcycle racing career statistics
Moto2 World Championship
Active years	2018–2021, 2024
Manufacturers	Kalex, KTM, Speed Up
Championships	0
2024 championship position	31st (0 pts)
Starts / Wins / Podiums / Poles / F. laps / Points; 52 / 0 / 0 / 0 / 0 / 0
MotoE World Championship
Active years	2020–2021
Manufacturers	Energica
Championships	0
2022 championship position	15th (31 pts)
Starts / Wins / Podiums / Poles / F. laps / Points; 20 / 0 / 0 / 0 / 0 / 86
Supersport World Championship
Active years	2017, 2025-
Manufacturers	MV Agusta, Yamaha, Ducati
Championships	0
2025 championship position	12th (91 pts)
Starts / Wins / Podiums / Poles / F. laps / Points; 30 / 0 / 0 / 0 / 0 / 98

Xavier "Xavi" Cardelús García (born 15 May 1998) is an Andorran former motorcycle racer. Before announcing his retirement in 2026, he last competed in the 2026 Supersport World Championship for the Cerba Yamaha Racing Team. He is son of the former motorcycle racer Xavier Cardelús Maestre.

== Career ==
=== Early career ===
Since 2015, Cardelús competes in the FIM CEV Moto2 European Championship.

In 2017, Cardelús also competed in the Supersport World Championship for Race Department ATK#25.

=== Moto2 World Championship ===
==== Reale Avintia Stylobike (2018) ====
===== 2018 =====
In 2018, Cardelús made his Grand Prix debut as a wild card for Team Stylobike.

==== Marinelli Snipers Team (2018) ====
At the Aragon round, Cardelús joined Marinelli Snipers Team, replacing Romano Fenati.

==== Sama Qatar Ángel Nieto Team (2019) ====
===== 2019 =====
Cardelús signed to ride for the Ángel Nieto Team in the 2019 Moto2 World Championship with British team-mate Jake Dixon, aboard machinery using 765 cc Triumph controlled engines new to the series, and KTM chassis.

==== Fantic Racing (2024) ====
Cardelús joined Fantic Racing with Arón Canet as a teammate.

== Career statistics ==
=== FIM CEV Moto3 Junior World Championship ===
==== Races by year ====
(key) (Races in bold indicate pole position; races in italics indicate fastest lap)

Year	Bike	1	2	3	4	5	6	7	8	9	10	11	Pos	Pts
2014	KTM	JER1; 11	JER2; 16	LMS; 11	ARA; 22	CAT1; 19	CAT2; 18	ALB; 20	NAV; 14	ALG; Ret	VAL1; Ret	VAL2; Ret	22nd	12

=== FIM Moto2 European Championship ===
==== Races by year ====
(key) (Races in bold indicate pole position) (Races in italics indicate fastest lap)

Year	Bike	1	2	3	4	5	6	7	8	9	10	11	Pos	Pts
2015	Kalex	ALG1; 10	ALG2; Ret	CAT; Ret	ARA1; 13	ARA2; 11	ALB; 16	NAV1; 13	NAV2; 12	JER; DNS	VAL1; 18	VAL2; Ret	16th	21
2016	Kalex	VAL1; 9	VAL2; 4	ARA1; 10	ARA2; DNS	CAT1; Ret	CAT2; 9	ALB; 10	ALG1; 11	ALG2; 10	JER; 12	VAL; 7	8th	63
2017	Kalex	ALB; 14	CAT1; 8	CAT2; 10	VAL1; DNS	VAL2; 9	EST1; Ret	EST2; 8	JER	ARA1; 13	ARA2; 11	VAL; 13	12th	42
2018	Kalex	EST1; Ret	EST2; 5	VAL; 11	CAT1; 7	CAT2; 6	ARA1; 12	ARA2; 7	JER; 8	ALB1; 2	ALB2; 2	VAL	8th	86
2020	Kalex	EST1; 7	EST2; 5	POR1; Ret	POR2; 5	JER1; 10	JER2; Ret	ARA1; 6	ARA2; 3	ARA3; Ret	VAL1; 4	VAL2; 5	6th	87
2022	Kalex	EST1; Ret	EST1; 5	VAL; 3	CAT1	CAT2	JER; 4	POR1; 3	POR2; 4	ARA1; 3	ARA2; 3	VAL; 4	5th	114
2023	Kalex	EST1; 13	EST2; 2	VAL; 6	JER; 5	POR1; 3	POR2; 2	**CAT1**; 1	**CAT2**; 3	ARA1; 6	ARA2; 8	VAL; 6	2nd	149

=== Supersport World Championship ===
==== Races by year ====
(key) (Races in bold indicate pole position; races in italics indicate fastest lap)

Year	Bike	1	2	3	4	5	6	7	8	9	10	11	12	Pos	Pts
2017	MV Agusta	AUS	THA	SPA; 13	NED	ITA	GBR; Ret	ITA	GER; DNS	POR	FRA			36th	5
2017	Yamaha											SPA; 23	QAT; 14	36th	5

Year	Bike	1		2		3		4		5		6		7		8		9		10		11		12		Pos	Pts
Year	Bike	R1	R2	R1	R2	R1	R2	R1	R2	R1	R2	R1	R2	R1	R2	R1	R2	R1	R2	R1	R2	R1	R2	R1	R2	Pos	Pts
2025	Ducati	AUS; Ret	AUS; 8	POR; 14	POR; 13	ASS; Ret	ASS; 14	CRE; 6	CRE; 7	MOS; 14	MOS; 17	MIS; 17	MIS; 12	DON; 13	DON; 15	HUN; 10	HUN; 8	FRA; 11	FRA; 15	ARA; 7	ARA; 6	EST; 10	EST; 14	SPA; 16	SPA; Ret	12th	91
2026	Yamaha	AUS; 16	AUS; 14	POR	POR	NED	NED	HUN	HUN	CZE	CZE	ARA	ARA	EMI	EMI	GBR	GBR	FRA	FRA	ITA	ITA	EST	EST	SPA	SPA	17th*	2*

* Season still in progress.

=== Grand Prix motorcycle racing ===
==== By season ====
Season	Class	Motorcycle	Team	Race	Win	Podium	Pole	FLap	Pts	Plcd
2018	Moto2	Kalex	Reale Avintia Stylobike	7	0	0	0	0	0	33rd
2018	Moto2	Kalex	Marinelli Snipers Team Moto2	6	0	0	0	0	0	33rd
2019	Moto2	KTM	Sama Qatar Ángel Nieto Team	19	0	0	0	0	0	35th
2020	MotoE	Energica	Esponsorama Racing	7	0	0	0	0	34	15th
2020	Moto2	Speed Up	Aspar Team	2	0	0	0	0	0	34th
2021	MotoE	Energica	Esponsorama Racing	7	0	0	0	0	21	16th
2021	Moto2	Kalex	Cerba Promoracing Team	1	0	0	0	0	0	40th
2022	MotoE	Energica	Avintia Esponsorama Racing	6	0	0	0	0	31	15th
2024	Moto2	Kalex	Fantic Racing	18	0	0	0	0	0	31st
Total				**72**	**0**	**0**	**0**	**0**	**86**	

==== By class ====
Class	Seasons	1st GP	1st pod	1st win	Race	Win	Podiums	Pole	FLap	Pts	WChmp
Moto2	2018–2019, 2021, 2024	2018 Spain			52	0	0	0	0	0	0
MotoE	2020–2022	2020 Spain			20	0	0	0	0	86	0
Total	2018–2024				**72**	**0**	**0**	**0**	**0**	**86**	**0**

==== Races by year ====
(key) (Races in bold indicate pole position; races in italics indicate fastest lap)

Year	Class	Bike	1	2	3	4	5	6	7	8	9	10	11	12	13	14	15	16	17	18	19	20	Pos	Pts
2018	Moto2	Kalex	QAT	ARG	AME	SPA; 22	FRA; 26	ITA; 22	CAT	NED; DNS	GER; 24	CZE; Ret	AUT; 25	GBR; C	RSM; 25	ARA; 28	THA; 22	JPN; 27	AUS; Ret	MAL; Ret	VAL; 17		33rd	0
2019	Moto2	KTM	QAT; 25	ARG; 21	AME; Ret	SPA; 25	FRA; Ret	ITA; 25	CAT; 25	NED; 18	GER; 26	CZE; 25	AUT; 26	GBR; 27	RSM; 25	ARA; 27	THA; Ret	JPN; 23	AUS; 25	MAL; 23	VAL; 28		35th	0
2020	MotoE	Energica	SPA; 14	ANC; 10	RSM; 14	EMI1; 9	EMI2; 10	FRA1; 11	FRA2; 10														15th	34
2020	Moto2	Speed Up	QAT	SPA	ANC	CZE	AUT	STY	RSM	EMI	CAT	FRA	ARA; 24	TER; 22	EUR	VAL	POR						34th	0
2021	MotoE	Energica	SPA; Ret	FRA; 13	CAT; Ret	NED; 12	AUT; 18	RSM1; 10	RSM2; 8														16th	21
2021	Moto2	Kalex	QAT	DOH	POR	SPA	FRA	ITA	CAT	GER	NED	STY	AUT	GBR	ARA; 21	RSM	AME	EMI	ALR	VAL			40th	0
2022	MotoE	Energica	SPA1	SPA2	FRA1; 11	FRA2; 14	ITA1; DNS	ITA2; DNS	NED1	NED2	AUT1; 13	AUT2; 6	RSM1; 9	RSM2; 12									15th	31
2024	Moto2	Kalex	QAT; 23	POR; Ret	AME; 26	SPA; 17	FRA; 21	CAT; 16	ITA; 23	NED; DNS	GER	GBR; Ret	AUT; 26	CAT; 22	RSM; 27	EMI; 23	INA; Ret	JPN; 25	AUS; 20	THA; 20	MAL; 21	SLD; 22	31st	0
