= 2020 French motorcycle Grand Prix =

(France) 2020 French Grand Prix
Race details
- Race 10 of 15 races in the 2020 Grand Prix motorcycle racing season
- Date: 11 October 2020
- Official name: Shark Helmets Grand Prix de France
- Location: Bugatti Circuit; Le Mans, France
- Course: Permanent racing facility; 4.185 km (2.600 mi)

MotoGP
Pole position
| Rider | (France) Fabio Quartararo | Yamaha |
| Time | 1:31.315 | |
Fastest lap
| Rider | (France) Johann Zarco | Ducati |
| Time | 1:43.301 on lap 24 | |
Podium
| First | (Italy) Danilo Petrucci | Ducati |
| Second | (Spain) Álex Márquez | Honda |
| Third | (Spain) Pol Espargaró | KTM |

Moto2
Pole position
| Rider | (United States) Joe Roberts | Kalex |
| Time | 1:36.256 | |
Fastest lap
| Rider | (Spain) Augusto Fernández | Kalex |
| Time | 1:37.011 on lap 22 | |
Podium
| First | (United Kingdom) Sam Lowes | Kalex |
| Second | (Australia) Remy Gardner | Kalex |
| Third | (Italy) Marco Bezzecchi | Kalex |

Moto3
Pole position
| Rider | (Spain) Jaume Masiá | Honda |
| Time | 1:41.399 | |
Fastest lap
| Rider | (Italy) Celestino Vietti | KTM |
| Time | 1:41.690 on lap 10 | |
Podium
| First | (Italy) Celestino Vietti | KTM |
| Second | (Italy) Tony Arbolino | Honda |
| Third | (Spain) Albert Arenas | KTM |

MotoE Race 1
Pole position
| Rider | (Spain) Jordi Torres | Energica |
| Time | 1:43.843 | |
Fastest lap
| Rider | (Finland) Niki Tuuli | Energica |
| Time | 1:43.696 on lap 4 | |
Podium
| First | (Spain) Jordi Torres | Energica |
| Second | (France) Mike Di Meglio | Energica |
| Third | (Finland) Niki Tuuli | Energica |

MotoE Race 2
Pole position
| Rider | (Spain) Jordi Torres | Energica |
| Time | Winner of race 1 (Note: Statistic not officially recorded for the rider) | |
Fastest lap
| Rider | (Finland) Niki Tuuli | Energica |
| Time | 1:43.465 on lap 6 | |
Podium
| First | (Finland) Niki Tuuli | Energica |
| Second | (France) Mike Di Meglio | Energica |
| Third | (Australia) Joshua Hook | Energica |

The 2020 French motorcycle Grand Prix (officially known as the Shark Helmets Grand Prix de France) was the tenth round of the 2020 Grand Prix motorcycle racing season, the ninth round of the 2020 MotoGP World Championship and the last race of the 2020 MotoE World Cup, which represent the end of the season for the MotoE class. It was held at the Bugatti Circuit in Le Mans on 11 October 2020.

Spaniard Jordi Torres won the MotoE World Cup in the second race.

Italian Danilo Petrucci won the MotoGP with a time of 45:54.736 on his Ducati. Notably, Spaniard Joan Mir, during a practice session, lost his balance on entering a left turn and slid on his side for about 50 metres before managing to use the momentum as he entered the gravel pit to seamlessly regain his footing and fluidly transfer his momentum into a running action.

== Background ==
=== Impact of the COVID-19 pandemic ===
The opening rounds of the 2020 championship were heavily affected by the COVID-19 pandemic. Several Grands Prix were cancelled or postponed after the aborted opening round in Qatar, prompting the Fédération Internationale de Motocyclisme to draft a new calendar. On 11 June, a new schedule based solely within Europe was announced. The French Grand Prix, originally scheduled for 17 May as the sixth Grand Prix of the season, was placed on 11 October.

=== MotoGP Championship standings before the race ===
After his victory in the Catalan Grand Prix, Fabio Quartararo climbed to the top of the drivers' standings with 108 points, 8 points ahead of Joan Mir and 18 over Maverick Viñales. Andrea Dovizioso, previous leader of the classification, due to the accident with Johann Zarco in the Catalan race, fell to fourth place with 84 points, followed by Franco Morbidelli with 77 points.

In the team championship, Petronas Yamaha SRT with 185 points leads the Suzuki Ecstar Team Championship with 160. Monster Energy Yamaha is third with 148 points, followed by the Ducati Team and Pramac Racing with 123 and 118 points respectively.

=== MotoGP Entrants ===
- Stefan Bradl replaced Marc Márquez from the Czech Republic round onwards while he recovered from injuries sustained in his opening round crash.

== Free practice ==
=== MotoGP ===
The first session took place in wet conditions and saw Bradley Smith as the fastest ahead of Johann Zarco and Danilo Petrucci. The second session was held in changing and mixed conditions between wet and dry, with Jack Miller the fastest ahead of Maverick Viñales and Takaaki Nakagami. The third session had dry track conditions with Fabio Quartararo the fastest ahead of Miguel Oliveira and Franco Morbidelli.

=== Combined Free Practice 1-2-3 ===
The top ten riders (written in bold) qualified in Q2.

| Pos. | No. | Bikers | Constructor | Free practice times | | |
| Pos. | No. | Bikers | Constructor | FP1 | FP2 | FP3 |
|---|---|---|---|---|---|---|
| 1 | 20 | (France) **Fabio Quartararo** | **Yamaha** | 1:46.494 | 1:35.489 | 1:32.319 |
| 2 | 88 | (Portugal) **Miguel Oliveira** | **KTM** | 1:46.518 | 1:35.837 | 1:32.449 |
| 3 | 21 | (Italy) **Franco Morbidelli** | **Yamaha** | 1:44.441 | 1:35.369 | 1:32.476 |
| 4 | 43 | (Australia) **Jack Miller** | **Ducati** | 1:44.132 | 1:34.356 | 1:32.503 |
| 5 | 35 | (United Kingdom) **Cal Crutchlow** | **Honda** | 1:44.654 | 1:35.141 | 1:32.558 |
| 6 | 5 | (France) **Johann Zarco** | **Ducati** | 1:43.958 | 1:35.408 | 1:32.631 |
| 7 | 46 | (Italy) **Valentino Rossi** | **Yamaha** | 1:44.511 | 1:35.767 | 1:32.640 |
| 8 | 12 | (Spain) **Maverick Viñales** | **Yamaha** | 1:44.180 | 1:34.500 | 1:32.648 |
| 9 | 44 | (Spain) **Pol Espargaró** | **KTM** | 1:44.760 | 1:35.374 | 1:32.660 |
| 10 | 4 | (Italy) **Andrea Dovizioso** | **Ducati** | 1:44.148 | 1:38.726 | 1:32.686 |
| 11 | 33 | (South Africa) Brad Binder | KTM | 1:46.245 | 1:40.425 | 1:32.739 |
| 12 | 36 | (Spain) Joan Mir | Suzuki | 1:44.980 | 1:35.385 | 1:32.792 |
| 13 | 42 | (Spain) Álex Rins | Suzuki | 1:44.846 | 1:35.838 | 1:33.204 |
| 14 | 63 | (Italy) Francesco Bagnaia | Ducati | 1:44.783 | 1:36.012 | 1:33.290 |
| 15 | 53 | (Spain) Tito Rabat | Ducati | 1:46.856 | 1:40.165 | 1:33.293 |
| 16 | 9 | (Italy) Danilo Petrucci | Ducati | 1:44.024 | 1:35.054 | 1:33.297 |
| 17 | 73 | (Spain) Álex Márquez | Honda | 1:44.981 | 1:35.337 | 1:33.376 |
| 18 | 41 | (Spain) Aleix Espargaró | Aprilia | 1:45.092 | 1:39.361 | 1:33.470 |
| 19 | 30 | (Japan) Takaaki Nakagami | Honda | 1:46.474 | 1:34.857 | 1:33.482 |
| 20 | 27 | (Spain) Iker Lecuona | KTM | 1:46.618 | 1:36.190 | 1:33.499 |
| 21 | 6 | (Germany) Stefan Bradl | Honda | | 1:36.478 | 1:33.686 |
| 22 | 38 | (United Kingdom) Bradley Smith | Aprilia | 1:43.804 | 1:36.982 | 1:33.757 |
OFFICIAL MOTOGP COMBINED FREE PRACTICE TIMES REPORT

Fastest session lap

Personal Best lap

In the fourth session, Quartararo was the fastest ahead of Morbidelli and Viñales.

== Qualifying ==
=== MotoGP ===
| Pos. | No. | Rider | Constructor | Qualifying times | | Final grid | Row |
| Pos. | No. | Rider | Constructor | Q1 | Q2 | Final grid | Row |
|---|---|---|---|---|---|---|---|
| 1 | 20 | (France) Fabio Quartararo | Yamaha | Qualified in Q2 | 1:31.315 | 1 | 1 |
| 2 | 43 | (Australia) Jack Miller | Ducati | Qualified in Q2 | 1:31.537 | 2 | 1 |
| 3 | 9 | (Italy) Danilo Petrucci | Ducati | 1:31.952 | 1:31.674 | 3 | 1 |
| 4 | 35 | (United Kingdom) Cal Crutchlow | Honda | Qualified in Q2 | 1:31.686 | 4 | 2 |
| 5 | 12 | (Spain) Maverick Viñales | Yamaha | Qualified in Q2 | 1:31.719 | 5 | 2 |
| 6 | 4 | (Italy) Andrea Dovizioso | Ducati | Qualified in Q2 | 1:31.722 | 6 | 2 |
| 7 | 63 | (Italy) Francesco Bagnaia | Ducati | 1:32.054 | 1:31.752 | 7 | 3 |
| 8 | 44 | (Spain) Pol Espargaró | KTM | Qualified in Q2 | 1:31.795 | 8 | 3 |
| 9 | 5 | (France) Johann Zarco | Ducati | Qualified in Q2 | 1:31.832 | 9 | 3 |
| 10 | 46 | (Italy) Valentino Rossi | Yamaha | Qualified in Q2 | 1:31.889 | 10 | 4 |
| 11 | 21 | (Italy) Franco Morbidelli | Yamaha | Qualified in Q2 | 1:31.891 | 11 | 4 |
| 12 | 88 | (Portugal) Miguel Oliveira | KTM | Qualified in Q2 | 1:32.009 | 12 | 4 |
| 13 | 30 | (Japan) Takaaki Nakagami | Honda | 1:32.179 | N/A | 13 | 5 |
| 14 | 36 | (Spain) Joan Mir | Suzuki | 1:32.187 | N/A | 14 | 5 |
| 15 | 41 | (Spain) Aleix Espargaró | Aprilia | 1:32.539 | N/A | 15 | 5 |
| 16 | 42 | (Spain) Álex Rins | Suzuki | 1:32.757 | N/A | 16 | 6 |
| 17 | 33 | (South Africa) Brad Binder | KTM | 1:32.766 | N/A | 17 | 6 |
| 18 | 73 | (Spain) Álex Márquez | Honda | 1:32.774 | N/A | 18 | 6 |
| 19 | 38 | (United Kingdom) Bradley Smith | Aprilia | 1:32.833 | N/A | 19 | 7 |
| 20 | 27 | (Spain) Iker Lecuona | KTM | 1:32.859 | N/A | 20 | 7 |
| 21 | 6 | (Germany) Stefan Bradl | Honda | 1:32.861 | N/A | 21 | 7 |
| 22 | 53 | (Spain) Tito Rabat | Ducati | 1:33.610 | N/A | 22 | 8 |
| OFFICIAL MOTOGP QUALIFYING RESULTS | | | | | | | 8 |

== Warm-up ==
=== MotoGP ===
In the warm-up, Franco Morbidelli was the fastest ahead of Maverick Viñales and Cal Crutchlow.

== Race ==
=== MotoGP ===
| Pos. | No. | Rider | Team | Manufacturer | Laps | Time/Retired | Grid | Points |
|---|---|---|---|---|---|---|---|---|
| 1 | 9 | (Italy) Danilo Petrucci | Ducati Team | Ducati | 26 | 45:54.736 | 3 | 25 |
| 2 | 73 | (Spain) Álex Márquez | Repsol Honda Team | Honda | 26 | +1.273 | 18 | 20 |
| 3 | 44 | (Spain) Pol Espargaró | Red Bull KTM Factory Racing | KTM | 26 | +1.711 | 8 | 16 |
| 4 | 4 | (Italy) Andrea Dovizioso | Ducati Team | Ducati | 26 | +3.911 | 6 | 13 |
| 5 | 5 | (France) Johann Zarco | Esponsorama Racing | Ducati | 26 | +4.310 | 9 | 11 |
| 6 | 88 | (Portugal) Miguel Oliveira | Red Bull KTM Tech3 | KTM | 26 | +4.466 | 12 | 10 |
| 7 | 30 | (Japan) Takaaki Nakagami | LCR Honda Idemitsu | Honda | 26 | +5.921 | 13 | 9 |
| 8 | 6 | (Germany) Stefan Bradl | Repsol Honda Team | Honda | 26 | +15.597 | 21 | 8 |
| 9 | 20 | (France) Fabio Quartararo | Petronas Yamaha SRT | Yamaha | 26 | +16.687 | 1 | 7 |
| 10 | 12 | (Spain) Maverick Viñales | Monster Energy Yamaha MotoGP | Yamaha | 26 | +16.895 | 5 | 6 |
| 11 | 36 | (Spain) Joan Mir | Team Suzuki Ecstar | Suzuki | 26 | +16.980 | 14 | 5 |
| 12 | 33 | (South Africa) Brad Binder | Red Bull KTM Factory Racing | KTM | 26 | +27.321 | 17 | 4 |
| 13 | 63 | (Italy) Francesco Bagnaia | Pramac Racing | Ducati | 26 | +33.351 | 7 | 3 |
| 14 | 41 | (Spain) Aleix Espargaró | Aprilia Racing Team Gresini | Aprilia | 26 | +39.176 | 15 | 2 |
| 15 | 27 | (Spain) Iker Lecuona | Red Bull KTM Tech3 | KTM | 26 | +51.087 | 20 | 1 |
| NC^{1} | 42 | (Spain) Álex Rins | Team Suzuki Ecstar | Suzuki | 26 | +1:14.190 | 16 | |
| Ret | 43 | (Australia) Jack Miller | Pramac Racing | Ducati | 19 | Engine | 2 | |
| Ret | 21 | (Italy) Franco Morbidelli | Petronas Yamaha SRT | Yamaha | 18 | Accident Damage | 11 | |
| Ret | 35 | (United Kingdom) Cal Crutchlow | LCR Honda Castrol | Honda | 17 | Accident | 4 | |
| Ret | 53 | (Spain) Tito Rabat | Esponsorama Racing | Ducati | 14 | Accident Damage | 22 | |
| Ret | 38 | (United Kingdom) Bradley Smith | Aprilia Racing Team Gresini | Aprilia | 8 | Accident | 19 | |
| Ret | 46 | (Italy) Valentino Rossi | Monster Energy Yamaha MotoGP | Yamaha | 0 | Accident | 10 | |
Fastest lap: (France) Johann Zarco (Ducati) – 1:43.301 (lap 24)

Notes

- ^1 – Álex Rins is not classified due to finishing the race through pits.

=== Moto2 ===
| Pos. | No. | Rider | Manufacturer | Laps | Time/Retired | Grid | Points |
|---|---|---|---|---|---|---|---|
| 1 | 22 | (United Kingdom) Sam Lowes | Kalex | 25 | 41:27.648 | 2 | 25 |
| 2 | 87 | (Australia) Remy Gardner | Kalex | 25 | +3.822 | 3 | 20 |
| 3 | 72 | (Italy) Marco Bezzecchi | Kalex | 25 | +4.184 | 5 | 16 |
| 4 | 37 | (Spain) Augusto Fernández | Kalex | 25 | +5.884 | 14 | 13 |
| 5 | 12 | (Switzerland) Thomas Lüthi | Kalex | 25 | +21.668 | 13 | 11 |
| 6 | 16 | (United States) Joe Roberts | Kalex | 25 | +29.197 | 1 | 10 |
| 7 | 21 | (Italy) Fabio Di Giannantonio | Speed Up | 25 | +32.249 | 11 | 9 |
| 8 | 7 | (Italy) Lorenzo Baldassarri | Kalex | 25 | +34.376 | 25 | 8 |
| 9 | 35 | (Thailand) Somkiat Chantra | Kalex | 25 | +35.392 | 23 | 7 |
| 10 | 23 | (Germany) Marcel Schrötter | Kalex | 25 | +35.521 | 18 | 6 |
| 11 | 33 | (Italy) Enea Bastianini | Kalex | 25 | +37.720 (Note: 3-second penalty for shortcutting the track and gaining an advantage.) | 9 | 5 |
| 12 | 40 | (Spain) Héctor Garzó | Kalex | 25 | +37.910 | 15 | 4 |
| 13 | 42 | (Spain) Marcos Ramírez | Kalex | 25 | +38.423 | 16 | 3 |
| 14 | 62 | (Italy) Stefano Manzi | MV Agusta | 25 | +43.464 | 10 | 2 |
| 15 | 55 | (Malaysia) Hafizh Syahrin | Speed Up | 25 | +44.036 | 22 | 1 |
| 16 | 24 | (Italy) Simone Corsi | MV Agusta | 25 | +44.217 | 12 | |
| 17 | 10 | (Italy) Luca Marini | Kalex | 25 | +59.550 | 6 | |
| 18 | 19 | (Italy) Lorenzo Dalla Porta | Kalex | 25 | +1:09.735 | 20 | |
| 19 | 57 | (Spain) Edgar Pons | Kalex | 25 | +1:09.751 | 24 | |
| 20 | 64 | (Netherlands) Bo Bendsneyder | NTS | 25 | +1:12.930 | 26 | |
| 21 | 45 | (Japan) Tetsuta Nagashima | Kalex | 25 | +1:14.158 | 21 | |
| 22 | 74 | (Poland) Piotr Biesiekirski | NTS | 24 | +1 lap | 29 | |
| Ret | 96 | (United Kingdom) Jake Dixon | Kalex | 20 | Accident | 8 | |
| Ret | 9 | (Spain) Jorge Navarro | Speed Up | 18 | Accident | 17 | |
| Ret | 11 | (Italy) Nicolò Bulega | Kalex | 15 | Handling | 19 | |
| Ret | 27 | (Indonesia) Andi Farid Izdihar | Kalex | 5 | Accident | 27 | |
| Ret | 97 | (Spain) Xavi Vierge | Kalex | 4 | Accident | 7 | |
| Ret | 88 | (Spain) Jorge Martín | Kalex | 2 | Accident | 4 | |
| DSQ | 99 | (Malaysia) Kasma Daniel | Kalex | 22 | Disqualified (Note: Disqualified for exceeding the pit lane speed limit during a ride through.) | 28 | |
| DNS | 44 | (Spain) Arón Canet | Speed Up | | Did not start | | |
OFFICIAL MOTO2 RACE REPORT

- Arón Canet suffered a broken finger in a crash during warm-up and withdrew from the event.

=== Moto3 ===
| Pos. | No. | Rider | Manufacturer | Laps | Time/Retired | Grid | Points |
|---|---|---|---|---|---|---|---|
| 1 | 13 | (Italy) Celestino Vietti | KTM | 22 | 37:37.384 | 10 | 25 |
| 2 | 14 | (Italy) Tony Arbolino | Honda | 22 | +0.142 | 7 | 20 |
| 3 | 75 | (Spain) Albert Arenas | KTM | 22 | +0.198 | 2 | 16 |
| 4 | 5 | (Spain) Jaume Masiá | Honda | 22 | +0.336 | 1 | 13 |
| 5 | 16 | (Italy) Andrea Migno | KTM | 22 | +0.569 | 13 | 11 |
| 6 | 71 | (Japan) Ayumu Sasaki | KTM | 22 | +0.834 | 8 | 10 |
| 7 | 25 | (Spain) Raúl Fernández | KTM | 22 | +1.361 | 4 | 9 |
| 8 | 2 | (Argentina) Gabriel Rodrigo | Honda | 22 | +1.625 | 6 | 8 |
| 9 | 79 | (Japan) Ai Ogura | Honda | 22 | +15.003 | 17 | 7 |
| 10 | 99 | (Spain) Carlos Tatay | KTM | 22 | +15.139 | 15 | 6 |
| 11 | 11 | (Spain) Sergio García | Honda | 22 | +15.269 | 5 | 5 |
| 12 | 12 | (Czech Republic) Filip Salač | Honda | 22 | +15.381 | 21 | 4 |
| 13 | 7 | (Italy) Dennis Foggia | Honda | 22 | +15.574 | 11 | 3 |
| 14 | 54 | (Italy) Riccardo Rossi | KTM | 22 | +15.729 | 26 | 2 |
| 15 | 82 | (Italy) Stefano Nepa | KTM | 22 | +17.743 | 14 | 1 |
| 16 | 70 | (Belgium) Barry Baltus | KTM | 22 | +18.991 | 31 | |
| 17 | 50 | (Switzerland) Jason Dupasquier | KTM | 22 | +19.173 | 29 | |
| 18 | 6 | (Japan) Ryusei Yamanaka | Honda | 22 | +25.148 | 18 | |
| 19 | 89 | (Malaysia) Khairul Idham Pawi | Honda | 22 | +26.189 | 28 | |
| 20 | 92 | (Japan) Yuki Kunii | Honda | 22 | +26.360 | 24 | |
| 21 | 73 | (Austria) Maximilian Kofler | KTM | 22 | +26.959 | 30 | |
| 22 | 53 | (Turkey) Deniz Öncü | KTM | 22 | +30.306 | 27 | |
| Ret | 23 | (Italy) Niccolò Antonelli | Honda | 18 | Accident | 19 | |
| Ret | 17 | (United Kingdom) John McPhee | Honda | 17 | Accident | 3 | |
| Ret | 52 | (Spain) Jeremy Alcoba | Honda | 17 | Accident | 25 | |
| Ret | 27 | (Japan) Kaito Toba | KTM | 17 | Accident | 16 | |
| Ret | 40 | (South Africa) Darryn Binder | KTM | 15 | Electronics | 12 | |
| Ret | 9 | (Italy) Davide Pizzoli | KTM | 12 | Accident | 22 | |
| Ret | 24 | (Japan) Tatsuki Suzuki | Honda | 7 | Accident | 20 | |
| Ret | 55 | (Italy) Romano Fenati | Husqvarna | 6 | Accident | 9 | |
| Ret | 21 | (Spain) Alonso López | Husqvarna | 6 | Accident | 23 | |
OFFICIAL MOTO3 RACE REPORT

=== MotoE ===
==== Race 1 ====
The race, scheduled to be run for 7 laps, was red-flagged after a first-lap accident involving Mattia Casadei. The race was later restarted over 5 laps with the original starting grid.

| Pos. | No. | Rider | Laps | Time/Retired | Grid | Points |
|---|---|---|---|---|---|---|
| 1 | 40 | (Spain) Jordi Torres | 5 | 8:43.391 | 1 | 25 |
| 2 | 63 | (France) Mike Di Meglio | 5 | +0.116 | 3 | 20 |
| 3 | 66 | (Finland) Niki Tuuli | 5 | +0.557 | 10 | 16 |
| 4 | 16 | (Australia) Joshua Hook | 5 | +1.925 | 4 | 13 |
| 5 | 70 | (Italy) Tommaso Marcon | 5 | +4.296 | 14 (Note: 3-place grid penalty.) | 11 |
| 6 | 51 | (Brazil) Eric Granado | 5 | +4.590 | 9 | 10 |
| 7 | 6 | (Spain) María Herrera | 5 | +6.514 | 11 | 9 |
| 8 (Note: 1-position penalty for exceeding track limits on the last lap.) | 55 | (Spain) Alejandro Medina | 5 | +6.201 | 7 | 8 |
| 9 | 61 | (Italy) Alessandro Zaccone | 5 | +11.875 | 13 | 7 |
| 10 | 35 | (Germany) Lukas Tulovic | 5 | +12.419 | 15 | 6 |
| 11 | 18 | (Andorra) Xavi Cardelús | 5 | +13.262 | 12 | 5 |
| 12 | 15 | (San Marino) Alex de Angelis | 5 | +14.087 | 17 | 4 |
| 13 | 84 | (Czech Republic) Jakub Kornfeil | 5 | +23.207 | 16 | 3 |
| 14 | 77 | (Switzerland) Dominique Aegerter | 5 | +59.643 | 5 | 2 |
| Ret | 11 | (Italy) Matteo Ferrari | 0 | Accident | 2 | |
| Ret | 7 | (Italy) Niccolò Canepa | 0 | Collision | 6 | |
| Ret | 10 | (Belgium) Xavier Siméon | 0 | Collision | 8 | |
| Ret | 27 | (Italy) Mattia Casadei | 0 | Did not restart | 18 | |
OFFICIAL MOTOE RACE 1 REPORT

- All bikes manufactured by Energica.

==== Race 2 ====
| Pos. | No. | Rider | Laps | Time/Retired | Grid | Points |
|---|---|---|---|---|---|---|
| 1 | 66 | (Finland) Niki Tuuli | 7 | 12:09.631 | 3 | 25 |
| 2 | 63 | (France) Mike Di Meglio | 7 | +0.166 | 2 | 20 |
| 3 | 16 | (Australia) Joshua Hook | 7 | +1.294 | 4 | 16 |
| 4 | 77 | (Switzerland) Dominique Aegerter | 7 | +2.353 | 14 | 13 |
| 5 | 11 | (Italy) Matteo Ferrari | 7 | +6.017 | 15 | 11 |
| 6 | 40 | (Spain) Jordi Torres | 7 | +6.490 | 1 | 10 |
| 7 | 7 | (Italy) Niccolò Canepa | 7 | +10.066 | 16 | 9 |
| 8 | 10 | (Belgium) Xavier Siméon | 7 | +10.472 | 17 | 8 |
| 9 | 6 | (Spain) María Herrera | 7 | +10.663 | 7 | 7 |
| 10 | 18 | (Andorra) Xavi Cardelús | 7 | +11.101 | 11 | 6 |
| 11 | 35 | (Germany) Lukas Tulovic | 7 | +11.298 | 10 | 5 |
| 12 | 61 | (Italy) Alessandro Zaccone | 7 | +12.327 | 9 | 4 |
| 13 | 27 | (Italy) Mattia Casadei | 7 | +20.842 | 18 | 3 |
| 14 | 15 | (San Marino) Alex de Angelis | 7 | +20.954 | 12 | 2 |
| 15 | 84 | (Czech Republic) Jakub Kornfeil | 7 | +24.376 | 13 | 1 |
| Ret | 70 | (Italy) Tommaso Marcon | 0 | Accident | 5 | |
| Ret | 51 | (Brazil) Eric Granado | 0 | Accident | 6 | |
| Ret | 55 | (Spain) Alejandro Medina | 0 | Accident | 8 | |
OFFICIAL MOTOE RACE 2 REPORT

- All bikes manufactured by Energica.

== Championship standings after the race ==
Below are the standings for the top five riders, constructors, and teams after the round.

=== MotoGP ===
Riders' Championship standings

| | Pos. | Rider | Points |
|---|---|---|---|
| | 1 | (France) Fabio Quartararo | 115 |
| | 2 | (Spain) Joan Mir | 105 |
| 1 | 3 | (Italy) Andrea Dovizioso | 97 |
| 1 | 4 | (Spain) Maverick Viñales | 96 |
| 2 | 5 | (Japan) Takaaki Nakagami | 81 |

Constructors' Championship standings

| | Pos. | Constructor | Points |
|---|---|---|---|
| | 1 | (Italy) Ducati | 151 |
| 2 | 2 | (Austria) KTM | 125 |
| | 3 | (Japan) Yamaha | 120 (Note: Yamaha scored 170 points as a manufacturer, but were deducted 50 points after failing to respect MSMA technical changes protocols.) |
| 2 | 4 | (Japan) Suzuki | 118 |
| | 5 | (Japan) Honda | 92 |

Teams' Championship standings

| | Pos. | Team | Points |
|---|---|---|---|
| | 1 | (Japan) Team Suzuki Ecstar | 165 |
| 2 | 3 | (Italy) Ducati Team | 161 |
| 1 | 3 | (Malaysia) Petronas Yamaha SRT | 155 (Note: Petronas Yamaha SRT riders scored 192 points, but the team was deducted 37 points after failing to respect MSMA technical changes protocols.) |
| 2 | 4 | (Austria) Red Bull KTM Factory Racing | 135 |
| 2 | 5 | (Japan) Monster Energy Yamaha MotoGP | 134 (Note: Monster Energy Yamaha MotoGP riders scored 154 points, but the team was deducted 20 points after failing to respect MSMA technical changes protocols.) |

=== Moto2 ===
Riders' Championship standings

| Pos. | Rider | Points |
|---|---|---|
| 1 | (Italy) Luca Marini | 150 |
| 2 | (Italy) Enea Bastianini | 135 |
| 3 | (Italy) Marco Bezzecchi | 130 |
| 4 | (United Kingdom) Sam Lowes | 128 |
| 5 | (Spain) Jorge Martín | 79 |

Constructors' Championship standings

| Pos. | Constructor | Points |
|---|---|---|
| 1 | (Germany) Kalex | 250 |
| 2 | (Italy) Speed Up | 91 |
| 3 | (Italy) MV Agusta | 24 |
| 4 | (Japan) NTS | 9 |

Teams' Championship standings

| | Pos. | Team | Points |
|---|---|---|---|
| | 1 | (Italy) Sky Racing Team VR46 | 280 |
| 1 | 2 | (Belgium) EG 0,0 Marc VDS | 177 |
| 1 | 3 | (Finland) Red Bull KTM Ajo | 151 |
| | 4 | (Italy) Italtrans Racing Team | 140 |
| | 5 | (Germany) Liqui Moly Intact GP | 128 |

=== Moto3 ===
Riders' Championship standings

| | Pos. | Rider | Points |
|---|---|---|---|
| 1 | 1 | (Spain) Albert Arenas | 135 |
| 1 | 2 | (Japan) Ai Ogura | 129 |
| 2 | 3 | (Italy) Celestino Vietti | 119 |
| | 4 | (Italy) Tony Arbolino | 115 |
| 2 | 5 | (United Kingdom) John McPhee | 98 |

Constructors' Championship standings

| | Pos. | Constructor | Points |
|---|---|---|---|
| 1 | 1 | (Austria) KTM | 212 |
| 1 | 2 | (Japan) Honda | 211 |
| | 3 | (Sweden) Husqvarna | 61 |

Teams' Championship standings

| | Pos. | Team | Points |
|---|---|---|---|
| 2 | 1 | (Italy) Sky Racing Team VR46 | 166 |
| 1 | 2 | (Spain) Gaviota Aspar Team Moto3 | 161 |
| 1 | 3 | (Luxembourg) Leopard Racing | 146 |
| 2 | 4 | (Italy) Rivacold Snipers Team | 135 |
| 1 | 5 | (Japan) Honda Team Asia | 129 |

=== MotoE ===
| | Pos. | Rider | Points |
|---|---|---|---|
| 2 | 1 | (Spain) Jordi Torres | 114 |
| 1 | 2 | (Italy) Matteo Ferrari | 97 |
| 1 | 3 | (Switzerland) Dominique Aegerter | 97 |
| 4 | 4 | (France) Mike Di Meglio | 75 |
| 1 | 5 | (Italy) Mattia Casadei | 74 |

== Notes ==
| Previous race: 2020 Catalan Grand Prix | FIM Grand Prix World Championship; 2020 season | Next race: 2020 Aragon Grand Prix |
| Previous race: 2019 French Grand Prix | French motorcycle Grand Prix | Next race: 2021 French Grand Prix |
