= Valencian motorcycle Grand Prix =

Motorcycle race held in Spain

Coordinates: 39°29′09″N 0°37′41″W

Valencian Grand Prix

Grand Prix motorcycle racing
- Venue: Circuit Ricardo Tormo (1999–2023, 2025–present)
- First race: 1999
- Most wins (rider): Dani Pedrosa (7)
- Most wins (manufacturer): Honda (20)

The Valencian motorcycle Grand Prix is a motorcycling event that is part of the FIM Grand Prix motorcycle racing season. The event takes place at the Circuit Ricardo Tormo (also known as Circuit de Valencia). From 1999 to 2025, the race was known as the Valencian Community motorcycle Grand Prix. Between 2022 and 2026, Circuit Ricardo Tormo is due to host at least three Grands Prix. Then, the circuit will host races until 2031 every year.

== Official names and sponsors ==
- 1999: Gran Premio MoviStar de la Comunitat Valenciana
- 2000–2004: Gran Premio Marlboro de la Comunitat Valenciana
- 2005: Gran Premio betandwin.com de la Comunitat Valenciana
- 2006–2007: Gran Premio bwin.com de la Comunitat Valenciana
- 2008: Gran Premio Parts Europe de la Comunitat Valenciana
- 2009–2014: Gran Premio Generali de la Comunitat Valenciana
- 2015–2023: Gran Premio Motul de la Comunitat Valenciana
- 2025: Motul Grand Prix of the Valencian Community
- 2026: Motul Grand Prix of Valencia

== Winners ==
=== Multiple winners (riders) ===
# Wins	Rider	Wins	
# Wins	Rider	Category	Years won
7	(Spain) Dani Pedrosa	MotoGP	2007, 2009, 2012, 2017
7	(Spain) Dani Pedrosa	250cc	2004, 2005
7	(Spain) Dani Pedrosa	125cc	2002
4	(Spain) Jorge Lorenzo	MotoGP	2010, 2013, 2015, 2016
3	(Australia) Casey Stoner	MotoGP	2008, 2011
3	(Australia) Casey Stoner	125cc	2003
3	(Spain) Marc Márquez	MotoGP	2014, 2019
3	(Spain) Marc Márquez	Moto2	2012
3	(Portugal) Miguel Oliveira	Moto2	2017, 2018
3	(Portugal) Miguel Oliveira	Moto3	2015
2	(Italy) Marco Melandri	MotoGP	2005
2	(Italy) Marco Melandri	250cc	2002
2	(Italy) Valentino Rossi	MotoGP	2003, 2004
2	(Spain) Héctor Barberá	250cc	2009
2	(Spain) Héctor Barberá	125cc	2004
2	(Spain) Héctor Faubel	125cc	2006, 2007
2	(Spain) Maverick Viñales	Moto3	2013
2	(Spain) Maverick Viñales	125cc	2011
2	(Finland) Mika Kallio	250cc	2007
2	(Finland) Mika Kallio	125cc	2005
2	(South Africa) Brad Binder	Moto2	2019
2	(South Africa) Brad Binder	Moto3	2016
2	(Spain) Jorge Martín	Moto2	2020
2	(Spain) Jorge Martín	Moto3	2017
2	(Italy) Francesco Bagnaia	MotoGP	2021, 2023
2	(Spain) Izan Guevara	Moto2	2025
2	(Spain) Izan Guevara	Moto3	2022

=== Multiple winners (manufacturers) ===
# Wins	Manufacturer	Wins	
# Wins	Manufacturer	Category	Years won
20	(Japan) Honda	MotoGP	2002, 2003, 2005, 2007, 2009, 2011, 2012, 2014, 2017, 2019
20	(Japan) Honda	250cc	1999, 2001, 2004, 2005
20	(Japan) Honda	Moto3	2017, 2019, 2020, 2021, 2025
20	(Japan) Honda	125cc	2002
15	(Italy) Aprilia	MotoGP	2025
15	(Italy) Aprilia	250cc	2002, 2003, 2006, 2009
15	(Italy) Aprilia	125cc	1999, 2000, 2003, 2004, 2006, 2007, 2008, 2008, 2010, 2011
11	(Austria) KTM	Moto2	2017, 2018, 2019
11	(Austria) KTM	250cc	2007
11	(Austria) KTM	Moto3	2012, 2013, 2014, 2015, 2016, 2018
11	(Austria) KTM	125cc	2005
9	(Japan) Yamaha	MotoGP	2004, 2010, 2013, 2015, 2016, 2020
9	(Japan) Yamaha	500cc	1999, 2000
9	(Japan) Yamaha	250cc	2000
5	(Germany) Kalex	Moto2	2015, 2016, 2020, 2021, 2022
5	(Italy) Ducati	MotoGP	2006, 2008, 2018, 2021, 2023
3	(Switzerland) Suter	Moto2	2012, 2013, 2014
2	(Italy) Gilera	250cc	2008
2	(Italy) Gilera	125cc	2001
2	(Japan) Suzuki	MotoGP	2022
2	(Japan) Suzuki	500cc	2001
2	(Italy) Boscoscuro	Moto2	2023, 2025

=== By year ===
A pink background indicates an event that was not part of the Grand Prix motorcycle racing championship.

Year	Track	Moto3		Moto2		MotoGP		Report
Year	Track	Rider	Manufacturer	Rider	Manufacturer	Rider	Manufacturer	Report
2026	Valencia							Report
2025	Valencia	(Spain) Adrián Fernández	Honda	(Spain) Izan Guevara	Boscoscuro	(Italy) Marco Bezzecchi	Aprilia	Report
2024	Valencia	Not held due to the floods in eastern Spain. Replaced by the Solidarity Grand Prix of Barcelona						
2023	Valencia	(Japan) Ayumu Sasaki	Husqvarna	(Spain) Fermín Aldeguer	Boscoscuro	(Italy) Francesco Bagnaia	Ducati	Report
2022	Valencia	(Spain) Izan Guevara	GasGas	(Spain) Pedro Acosta	Kalex	(Spain) Álex Rins	Suzuki	Report
2021	Valencia	(Spain) Xavier Artigas	Honda	(Spain) Raúl Fernández	Kalex	(Italy) Francesco Bagnaia	Ducati	Report

Year	Track	MotoE				Moto3		Moto2		MotoGP		Report
Year	Track	Race 1		Race 2		Moto3		Moto2		MotoGP		Report
Year	Track	Rider	Manufacturer	Rider	Manufacturer	Rider	Manufacturer	Rider	Manufacturer	Rider	Manufacturer	Report
2020	Valencia	Cancelled due to COVID-19 concerns				(Italy) Tony Arbolino	Honda	(Spain) Jorge Martín	Kalex	(Italy) Franco Morbidelli	Yamaha	Report
2019	Valencia	(Brazil) Eric Granado	Energica	(Brazil) Eric Granado	Energica	(Spain) Sergio García	Honda	(South Africa) Brad Binder	KTM	(Spain) Marc Márquez	Honda	Report

Year	Track	Moto3		Moto2		MotoGP		Report
Year	Track	Rider	Manufacturer	Rider	Manufacturer	Rider	Manufacturer	Report
2018	Valencia	(Turkey) Can Öncü	KTM	(Portugal) Miguel Oliveira	KTM	(Italy) Andrea Dovizioso	Ducati	Report
2017	Valencia	(Spain) Jorge Martín	Honda	(Portugal) Miguel Oliveira	KTM	(Spain) Dani Pedrosa	Honda	Report
2016	Valencia	(South Africa) Brad Binder	KTM	(France) Johann Zarco	Kalex	(Spain) Jorge Lorenzo	Yamaha	Report
2015	Valencia	(Portugal) Miguel Oliveira	KTM	(Spain) Tito Rabat	Kalex	(Spain) Jorge Lorenzo	Yamaha	Report
2014	Valencia	(Australia) Jack Miller	KTM	(Switzerland) Thomas Lüthi	Suter	(Spain) Marc Márquez	Honda	Report
2013	Valencia	(Spain) Maverick Viñales	KTM	(Spain) Nicolás Terol	Suter	(Spain) Jorge Lorenzo	Yamaha	Report
2012	Valencia	(United Kingdom) Danny Kent	KTM	(Spain) Marc Márquez	Suter	(Spain) Dani Pedrosa	Honda	Report
Year	Track	125cc		Moto2		MotoGP		Report
Year	Track	Rider	Manufacturer	Rider	Manufacturer	Rider	Manufacturer	Report
2011	Valencia	(Spain) Maverick Viñales	Aprilia	(Italy) Michele Pirro	Moriwaki	(Australia) Casey Stoner	Honda	Report
2010	Valencia	(United Kingdom) Bradley Smith	Aprilia	(Czech Republic) Karel Abraham	FTR	(Spain) Jorge Lorenzo	Yamaha	Report
Year	Track	125cc		250cc		MotoGP		Report
Year	Track	Rider	Manufacturer	Rider	Manufacturer	Rider	Manufacturer	Report
2009	Valencia	(Spain) Julián Simón	Aprilia	(Spain) Héctor Barberá	Aprilia	(Spain) Dani Pedrosa	Honda	Report
2008	Valencia	(Italy) Simone Corsi	Aprilia	(Italy) Marco Simoncelli	Gilera	(Australia) Casey Stoner	Ducati	Report
2007	Valencia	(Spain) Héctor Faubel	Aprilia	(Finland) Mika Kallio	KTM	(Spain) Dani Pedrosa	Honda	Report
2006	Valencia	(Spain) Héctor Faubel	Aprilia	(San Marino) Alex de Angelis	Aprilia	(Australia) Troy Bayliss	Ducati	Report
2005	Valencia	(Finland) Mika Kallio	KTM	(Spain) Daniel Pedrosa	Honda	(Italy) Marco Melandri	Honda	Report
2004	Valencia	(Spain) Héctor Barberá	Aprilia	(Spain) Daniel Pedrosa	Honda	(Italy) Valentino Rossi	Yamaha	Report
2003	Valencia	(Australia) Casey Stoner	Aprilia	(France) Randy de Puniet	Aprilia	(Italy) Valentino Rossi	Honda	Report
2002	Valencia	(Spain) Daniel Pedrosa	Honda	(Italy) Marco Melandri	Aprilia	(Brazil) Alex Barros	Honda	Report
Year	Track	125cc		250cc		500cc		Report
Year	Track	Rider	Manufacturer	Rider	Manufacturer	Rider	Manufacturer	Report
2001	Valencia	(San Marino) Manuel Poggiali	Gilera	(Japan) Daijiro Kato	Honda	(Spain) Sete Gibernau	Suzuki	Report
2000	Valencia	(Italy) Roberto Locatelli	Aprilia	(Japan) Shinya Nakano	Yamaha	(Australia) Garry McCoy	Yamaha	Report
1999	Valencia	(Italy) Gianluigi Scalvini	Aprilia	(Japan) Tohru Ukawa	Honda	(France) Régis Laconi	Yamaha	Report
