= 2020 Andalusian motorcycle Grand Prix =

(Andalusia) 2020 Andalusian Grand Prix
Race details
- Race 3 of 15 races in the 2020 Grand Prix motorcycle racing season
- Date: 26 July 2020
- Official name: Gran Premio Red Bull de Andalucía
- Location: Circuito de Jerez – Ángel Nieto; Jerez de la Frontera, Cádiz, Spain
- Course: Permanent racing facility; 4.423 km (2.748 mi)

MotoGP
Pole position
Rider	(France) Fabio Quartararo	Yamaha
Time	1:37.007	
Fastest lap
Rider	(France) Fabio Quartararo	Yamaha
Time	1:38.119 on lap 3	
Podium
First	(France) Fabio Quartararo	Yamaha
Second	(Spain) Maverick Viñales	Yamaha
Third	(Italy) Valentino Rossi	Yamaha

Moto2
Pole position
Rider	(Italy) Marco Bezzecchi	Kalex
Time	1:41.728	
Fastest lap
Rider	(Italy) Enea Bastianini	Kalex
Time	1:42.077 on lap 2	
Podium
First	(Italy) Enea Bastianini	Kalex
Second	(Italy) Luca Marini	Kalex
Third	(Italy) Marco Bezzecchi	Kalex

Moto3
Pole position
Rider	(Japan) Tatsuki Suzuki	Honda
Time	1:45.410	
Fastest lap
Rider	(Spain) Jaume Masiá	Honda
Time	1:46.060 on lap 4	
Podium
First	(Japan) Tatsuki Suzuki	Honda
Second	(United Kingdom) John McPhee	Honda
Third	(Italy) Celestino Vietti	KTM

MotoE
Pole position
Rider	(Switzerland) Dominique Aegerter	Energica
Time	1:48.158	
Fastest lap
Rider	(Brazil) Eric Granado	Energica
Time	1:47.584 on lap 4	
Podium
First	(Switzerland) Dominique Aegerter	Energica
Second	(Spain) Jordi Torres	Energica
Third	(Italy) Mattia Casadei	Energica

The 2020 Andalusian motorcycle Grand Prix was the third round of the 2020 Grand Prix motorcycle racing season and the second round of the 2020 MotoGP World Championship. It was held at the Circuito de Jerez – Ángel Nieto in Jerez de la Frontera on 26 July 2020. The Grand Prix was introduced as a response to the COVID-19 pandemic. This was Valentino Rossi's final MotoGP podium before he retired.

== Background ==
=== Impact of the COVID-19 pandemic ===
The originally scheduled calendar for the 2020 championship was heavily affected by the COVID-19 pandemic. Several Grands Prix were cancelled or postponed after the aborted opening round in Qatar, prompting the Fédération Internationale de Motocyclisme to draft a new calendar. The start of the championship was delayed until 19 July, with the Circuito de Jerez – Ángel Nieto hosting the Spanish Grand Prix as the opening round of the championship.

Organisers of the race signed a contract with Dorna Sports, the sport's commercial rights holder, to host a second round at the circuit on 26 July (a week after the first race) to be known as the Andalusian Grand Prix. The race was named for Andalusia, the autonomous community of Spain that the Circuito de Jerez – Ángel Nieto is located in. The back-to-back Spanish races would mark the first time that a country hosts back-to-back races in the same season.

== Race ==
=== MotoGP ===
Pos.	No.	Rider	Team	Manufacturer	Laps	Time/Retired	Grid	Points
1	20	(France) Fabio Quartararo	Petronas Yamaha SRT	Yamaha	25	41:22.666	1	25
2	12	(Spain) Maverick Viñales	Monster Energy Yamaha MotoGP	Yamaha	25	+4.495	2	20
3	46	(Italy) Valentino Rossi	Monster Energy Yamaha MotoGP	Yamaha	25	+5.546	4	16
4	30	(Japan) Takaaki Nakagami	LCR Honda Idemitsu	Honda	25	+6.113	8	13
5	36	(Spain) Joan Mir	Team Suzuki Ecstar	Suzuki	25	+7.693	10	11
6	4	(Italy) Andrea Dovizioso	Ducati Team	Ducati	25	+12.554	14	10
7	44	(Spain) Pol Espargaró	Red Bull KTM Factory Racing	KTM	25	+17.488	12	9
8	73	(Spain) Álex Márquez	Repsol Honda Team	Honda	25	+19.357	21	8
9	5	(France) Johann Zarco	Hublot Reale Avintia	Ducati	25	+23.523	15	7
10	42	(Spain) Álex Rins	Team Suzuki Ecstar	Suzuki	25	+27.091	20	6
11	53	(Spain) Tito Rabat	Hublot Reale Avintia	Ducati	25	+33.628	18	5
12	38	(United Kingdom) Bradley Smith	Aprilia Racing Team Gresini	Aprilia	25	+36.306	19	4
13	35	(United Kingdom) Cal Crutchlow	LCR Honda Castrol	Honda	24	+1 lap	13	3
Ret	63	(Italy) Francesco Bagnaia	Pramac Racing	Ducati	19	Engine	3	
Ret	21	(Italy) Franco Morbidelli	Petronas Yamaha SRT	Yamaha	16	Valve System	6	
Ret	33	(South Africa) Brad Binder	Red Bull KTM Factory Racing	KTM	12	Accident	9	
Ret	9	(Italy) Danilo Petrucci	Ducati Team	Ducati	11	Accident	11	
Ret	43	(Australia) Jack Miller	Pramac Racing	Ducati	10	Accident	7	
Ret	41	(Spain) Aleix Espargaró	Aprilia Racing Team Gresini	Aprilia	8	Accident	16	
Ret	27	(Spain) Iker Lecuona	Red Bull KTM Tech3	KTM	5	Accident Damage	17	
Ret	88	(Portugal) Miguel Oliveira	Red Bull KTM Tech3	KTM	0	Collision	5	
DNS	93	(Spain) Marc Márquez	Repsol Honda Team	Honda		Did not start		
Fastest lap: (France) Fabio Quartararo (Yamaha) – 1:38.119 (lap 3)
Sources:

- Marc Márquez withdrew from the event due to effects of a broken arm suffered at the Spanish Grand Prix.

=== Moto2 ===
Pos.	No.	Rider	Manufacturer	Laps	Time/Retired	Grid	Points
1	33	(Italy) Enea Bastianini	Kalex	23	39:23.922	3	25
2	10	(Italy) Luca Marini	Kalex	23	+2.153	5	20
3	72	(Italy) Marco Bezzecchi	Kalex	23	+3.243	1	16
4	22	(United Kingdom) Sam Lowes	Kalex	23	+3.817	2	13
5	44	(Spain) Arón Canet	Speed Up	23	+9.155	7	11
6	88	(Spain) Jorge Martín	Kalex	23	+11.988	6	10
7	12	(Switzerland) Thomas Lüthi	Kalex	23	+13.857	9	9
8	97	(Spain) Xavi Vierge	Kalex	23	+19.590	12	8
9	62	(Italy) Stefano Manzi	MV Agusta	23	+20.199	19	7
10	23	(Germany) Marcel Schrötter	Kalex	23	+20.262	10	6
11	45	(Japan) Tetsuta Nagashima	Kalex	23	+20.447	15	5
12	11	(Italy) Nicolò Bulega	Kalex	23	+21.464	8	4
13	37	(Spain) Augusto Fernández	Kalex	23	+24.804	23	3
14	87	(Australia) Remy Gardner	Kalex	23	+26.370	14	2
15	42	(Spain) Marcos Ramírez	Kalex	23	+27.018	18	1
16	57	(Spain) Edgar Pons	Kalex	23	+27.126	13	
17	16	(United States) Joe Roberts	Kalex	23	+30.228	26	
18	21	(Italy) Fabio Di Giannantonio	Speed Up	23	+30.895	11	
19	64	(Netherlands) Bo Bendsneyder	NTS	23	+41.678	24	
20	27	(Indonesia) Andi Farid Izdihar	Kalex	23	+41.793	28	
Ret	7	(Italy) Lorenzo Baldassarri	Kalex	20	Accident	16	
Ret	24	(Italy) Simone Corsi	MV Agusta	19	Engine	17	
Ret	55	(Malaysia) Hafizh Syahrin	Speed Up	12	Accident	22	
Ret	9	(Spain) Jorge Navarro	Speed Up	9	Accident	4	
Ret	35	(Thailand) Somkiat Chantra	Kalex	5	Accident	20	
Ret	40	(Spain) Héctor Garzó	Kalex	4	Accident	27	
Ret	19	(Italy) Lorenzo Dalla Porta	Kalex	4	Accident	25	
Ret	99	(Malaysia) Kasma Daniel	Kalex	3	Accident	29	
Ret	96	(United Kingdom) Jake Dixon	Kalex	2	Accident	21	
DNS	2	(Switzerland) Jesko Raffin	NTS		Did not start		

- Jesko Raffin withdrew from the event due to a fatigue syndrome.

=== Moto3 ===
Pos.	No.	Rider	Manufacturer	Laps	Time/Retired	Grid	Points
1	24	(Japan) Tatsuki Suzuki	Honda	22	39:18.861	1	25
2	17	(United Kingdom) John McPhee	Honda	22	+0.064	8	20
3	13	(Italy) Celestino Vietti	KTM	22	+0.134	9	16
4	40	(South Africa) Darryn Binder	KTM	22	+0.628	25	13
5	2	(Argentina) Gabriel Rodrigo	Honda	22	+0.817	3	11
6	25	(Spain) Raúl Fernández	KTM	22	+2.742	4	10
7	52	(Spain) Jeremy Alcoba	Honda	22	+3.315 (Note: 3-second penalty.)	7	9
8	11	(Spain) Sergio García	Honda	22	+4.853	13	8
9	6	(Japan) Ryusei Yamanaka	Honda	22	+4.887	17	7
10	14	(Italy) Tony Arbolino	Honda	22	+4.988	5	6
11	27	(Japan) Kaito Toba	KTM	22	+5.301	12	5
12	55	(Italy) Romano Fenati	Husqvarna	22	+5.603	21	4
13	99	(Spain) Carlos Tatay	KTM	22	+6.783	11	3
14	82	(Italy) Stefano Nepa	KTM	22	+7.729	22	2
15	23	(Italy) Niccolò Antonelli	Honda	22	+7.776	20	1
16	92	(Japan) Yuki Kunii	Honda	22	+17.641	19	
17	70	(Belgium) Barry Baltus	KTM	22	+17.416	29	
18	73	(Austria) Maximilian Kofler	KTM	22	+20.821	24	
19	50	(Switzerland) Jason Dupasquier	KTM	22	+20.833	28	
20	89	(Malaysia) Khairul Idham Pawi	Honda	22	+22.445	26	
21	54	(Italy) Riccardo Rossi	KTM	22	+22.500	27	
22	16	(Italy) Andrea Migno	KTM	22	+34.688	18	
Ret	9	(Italy) Davide Pizzoli	KTM	20	Retired	30	
Ret	7	(Italy) Dennis Foggia	Honda	19	Clutch	23	
Ret	53	(Turkey) Deniz Öncü	KTM	18	Accident	14	
Ret	71	(Japan) Ayumu Sasaki	KTM	16	Accident Damage	16	
Ret	5	(Spain) Jaume Masiá	Honda	15	Collision Damage	10	
Ret	75	(Spain) Albert Arenas	KTM	14	Accident	6	
Ret	79	(Japan) Ai Ogura	Honda	14	Collision Damage	2	
Ret	12	(Czech Republic) Filip Salač	Honda	8	Knee Pain	15	
DNS	21	(Spain) Alonso López	Husqvarna		Did not start		
OFFICIAL MOTO3 RACE REPORT

- Alonso López suffered a heat exhaustion after Friday practice and withdrew from the event.

=== MotoE ===
Pos.	No.	Rider	Laps	Time/Retired	Grid	Points
1	77	(Switzerland) Dominique Aegerter	6	10:54.366	1	25
2	40	(Spain) Jordi Torres	6	+2.688	5	20
3	27	(Italy) Mattia Casadei	6	+3.759	8	16
4	15	(San Marino) Alex de Angelis	6	+4.484	7	13
5	7	(Italy) Niccolò Canepa	6	+4.537	9	11
6	35	(Germany) Lukas Tulovic	6	+5.980	3	10
7	63	(France) Mike Di Meglio	6	+6.133	13	9
8	16	(Australia) Joshua Hook	6	+6.513	10	8
9	10	(Belgium) Xavier Siméon	6	+8.695	12	7
10	18	(Andorra) Xavi Cardelús	6	+10.583	11	6
11	6	(Spain) María Herrera	6	+13.594	17	5
12	84	(Czech Republic) Jakub Kornfeil	6	+13.641	15	4
13	51	(Brazil) Eric Granado	6	+1:37.947	4	3
Ret	11	(Italy) Matteo Ferrari	4	Collision	2	
Ret	55	(Spain) Alejandro Medina	3	Accident	6	
Ret	61	(Italy) Alessandro Zaccone	0	Collision	14	
Ret	70	(Italy) Tommaso Marcon	0	Collision	16	
DNS	66	(Finland) Niki Tuuli		Did not start		
OFFICIAL MOTOE RACE REPORT

- All bikes manufactured by Energica.

== Championship standings after the race ==
Below are the standings for the top five riders, constructors, and teams after the round.

=== MotoGP ===
Riders' Championship standings

	Pos.	Rider	Points
	1	(France) Fabio Quartararo	50
	2	(Spain) Maverick Viñales	40
	3	(Italy) Andrea Dovizioso	26
6	4	(Japan) Takaaki Nakagami	19
1	5	(Spain) Pol Espargaró	19

Constructors' Championship standings

	Pos.	Constructor	Points
	1	(Japan) Yamaha	50
	2	(Italy) Ducati	26
1	3	(Japan) Honda	19
1	4	(Austria) KTM	19
1	5	(Japan) Suzuki	11

Teams' Championship standings

	Pos.	Team	Points
	1	(Malaysia) Petronas Yamaha SRT	61
2	2	(Japan) Monster Energy Yamaha MotoGP	56
1	3	(Italy) Ducati Team	33
4	4	(Monaco) LCR Honda	22
2	5	(Italy) Pramac Racing	22

=== Moto2 ===
Riders' Championship standings

	Pos.	Rider	Points
	1	(Japan) Tetsuta Nagashima	50
2	2	(Italy) Enea Bastianini	48
	3	(Italy) Luca Marini	45
2	4	(Spain) Arón Canet	30
3	5	(Italy) Lorenzo Baldassarri	28

Constructors' Championship standings

Pos.	Constructor	Points
1	(Germany) Kalex	75
2	(Italy) Speed Up	32
3	(Italy) MV Agusta	13
4	(Japan) NTS	5

Teams' Championship standings

	Pos.	Team	Points
	1	(Finland) Red Bull KTM Ajo	76
1	2	(Italy) Sky Racing Team VR46	65
2	3	(Italy) Italtrans Racing Team	48
	4	(Spain) Openbank Aspar Team Moto2	40
3	5	(Spain) Flexbox HP40	32

=== Moto3 ===
Riders' Championship standings

	Pos.	Rider	Points
	1	(Spain) Albert Arenas	50
3	2	(Japan) Tatsuki Suzuki	44
	3	(United Kingdom) John McPhee	40
2	4	(Japan) Ai Ogura	36
1	5	(Argentina) Gabriel Rodrigo	30

Constructors' Championship standings

Pos.	Constructor	Points
1	(Austria) KTM	66
2	(Japan) Honda	65
3	(Sweden) Husqvarna	10

Teams' Championship standings

	Pos.	Team	Points
	1	(Spain) Solunion Aspar Team Moto3	56
3	2	(Italy) Sic58 Squadra Corse	52
	3	(Italy) Kömmerling Gresini Moto3	49
4	4	(Malaysia) Petronas Sprinta Racing	40
2	5	(Italy) Sky Racing Team VR46	40

=== MotoE ===
	Pos.	Rider	Points
2	1	(Switzerland) Dominique Aegerter	41
4	2	(Spain) Jordi Torres	30
2	3	(Brazil) Eric Granado	28
1	4	(Italy) Mattia Casadei	27
1	5	(Germany) Lukas Tulovic	23

== Notes ==
Previous race: 2020 Spanish Grand Prix	FIM Grand Prix World Championship; 2020 season	Next race: 2020 Czech Republic Grand Prix
Previous race: None	Andalusian motorcycle Grand Prix	Next race: None
