= Olly Simpson =

Australian motorcycle racer

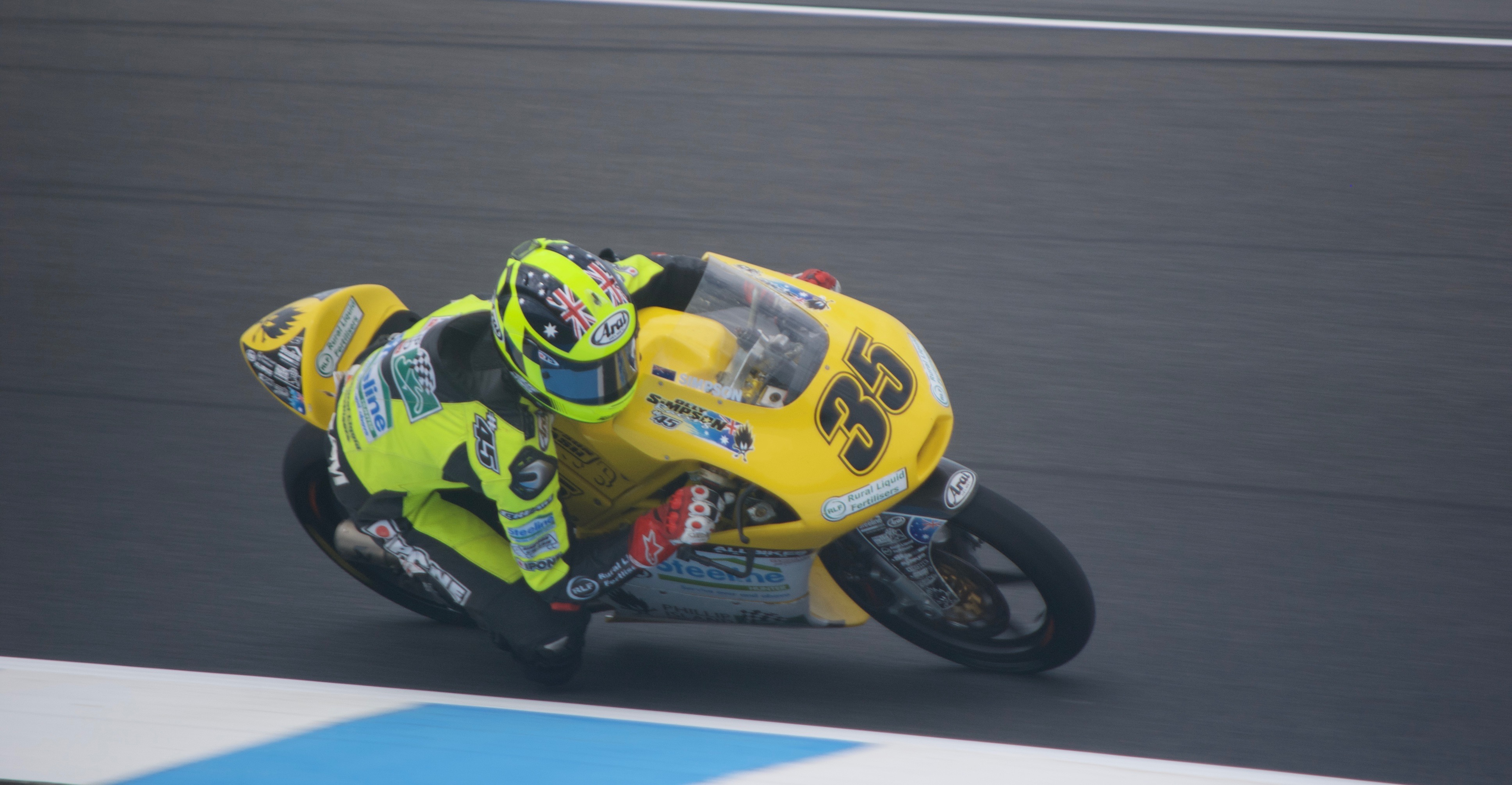
- Simpson at the 2015 Australian Grand Prix
- Nationality: Australian
- Born: 10 January 1998 (age 28); Adelaide, Australia
Motorcycle racing career statistics
Moto3 World Championship
Active years	2014–2015
Manufacturers	KTM
Championships	0
2015 championship position	NC (0 pts)
Starts / Wins / Podiums / Poles / F. laps / Points; 2 / 0 / 0 / 0 / 0 / 0

Olly Simpson (born 10 January 1998 in Adelaide) is an Australian motorcycle racer. From 2013 to 2015, he was a competitor of the Red Bull MotoGP Rookies Cup.

== Career statistics ==
=== Red Bull MotoGP Rookies Cup ===
==== Races by year ====
(key) (Races in bold indicate pole position, races in italics indicate fastest lap)

Year	1	2	3	4	5	6	7	8	9	10	11	12	13	14	Pos	Pts
2013	AME1; 16	AME2; 19	JER1; Ret	JER2; DNS	ASS1; 7	ASS2; 10	SAC1; Ret	SAC2; 5	BRN	SIL1	SIL2	MIS	ARA1; Ret	ARA2; 11	16th	31
2014	JER1; 10	JER1; 10	MUG; 4	ASS1; Ret	ASS2; 4	**SAC1**; Ret	**SAC2**; Ret	BRN1; 9	BRN2; 11	SIL1; Ret	SIL2; 7	MIS; 15	ARA1; 9	ARA2; Ret	11th	67
2015	JER1; 3	JER2; 3	ASS1; Ret	ASS2; DNS	SAC1; 8	SAC2; 5	BRN1; 17	BRN2; Ret	SIL1; 7	SIL2; Ret	MIS; 6	ARA1; 15	ARA2; 4		8th	84

=== FIM CEV Moto3 Junior World Championship ===
==== Races by year ====
(key) (Races in bold indicate pole position, races in italics indicate fastest lap)

Year	Bike	1	2	3	4	5	6	7	8	9	10	11	Pos	Pts
2013	Honda	CAT1; 13	CAT2; Ret	ARA	ALB1; 26	ALB2	NAV	VAL1	VAL1	JER			35th	3
2014	KTM	JER1; 18	JER2; 18	LMS; 29	ARA; 25	CAT1	CAT2	ALB	NAV	ALG	VAL1	VAL2	NC	0

=== Grand Prix motorcycle racing ===
==== By season ====
Season	Class	Motorcycle	Team	Race	Win	Podium	Pole	FLap	Pts	Plcd
2014	Moto3	KTM	Olly Simpson Racing	1	0	0	0	0	0	NC
2015	Moto3	KTM	Olly Simpson Racing	1	0	0	0	0	0	NC
Total				**2**	**0**	**0**	**0**	**0**	**0**	

==== Races by year ====
Year	Class	Bike	1	2	3	4	5	6	7	8	9	10	11	12	13	14	15	16	17	18	Pos.	Pts
2014	Moto3	KTM	QAT	AME	ARG	SPA	FRA	ITA	CAT	NED	GER	INP	CZE	GBR	RSM	ARA	JPN	AUS; 28	MAL	VAL	NC	0
2015	Moto3	KTM	QAT	AME	ARG	SPA	FRA	ITA	CAT	NED	GER	INP	CZE	GBR	RSM	ARA	JPN	AUS; 19	MAL	VAL	NC	0

=== Asia Road Racing Championship ===
==== Races by year ====
(key) (Races in bold indicate pole position; races in italics indicate fastest lap)

Year	Bike	1		2		3		4		5		6		Pos	Pts
Year	Bike	R1	R2	R1	R2	R1	R2	R1	R2	R1	R2	R1	R2	Pos	Pts
2026	Yamaha	SEP	SEP	CHA; 10	CHA; 10	MOT; 11	MOT; Ret	MAN	MAN	SEP	SEP	CHA	CHA	14th*	17*
