= Joan Mir =

Spanish motorcycle racer (born 1997)

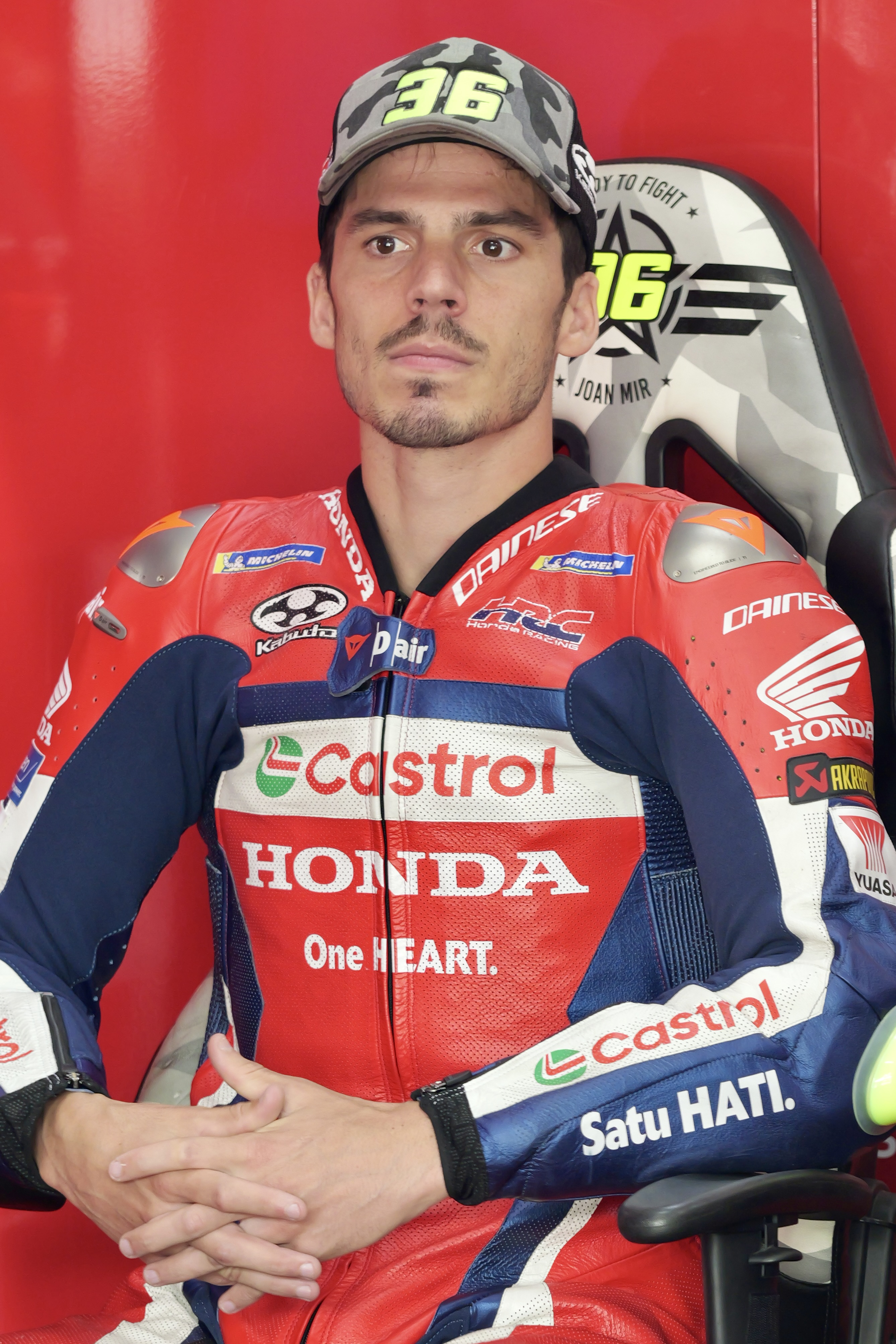
- Mir at the 2025 Malaysian Grand Prix
- Nationality: Spanish
- Born: 1 September 1997 (age 29); Palma, Spain
- Current team: Honda HRC Castrol
- Bike number: 36
Motorcycle racing career statistics
MotoGP World Championship
Active years	2019–
Manufacturers	Suzuki (2019–2022); Honda (2023–)
Championships	1 (2020)
2025 championship position	15th (96 pts)
Starts / Wins / Podiums / Poles / F. laps / Points; 130 / 1 / 15 / 0 / 1 / 727
Moto2 World Championship
Active years	2018
Manufacturers	Kalex
Championships	0
2018 championship position	6th (155 pts)
Starts / Wins / Podiums / Poles / F. laps / Points; 18 / 0 / 4 / 0 / 1 / 155
Moto3 World Championship
Active years	2015–2017
Manufacturers	Honda (2015, 2017); KTM (2016)
Championships	1 (2017)
2017 championship position	1st (341 pts)
Starts / Wins / Podiums / Poles / F. laps / Points; 37 / 11 / 16 / 2 / 5 / 485

Joan Mir Mayrata (Catalan: [ʒu'an mir məj'ratə], born 1 September 1997) is a Spanish Grand Prix motorcycle racer riding for the Honda HRC Castrol team in the MotoGP World Championship. Mir is best known for winning the 2020 MotoGP World Championship with Suzuki. He is the fourth Spanish rider to win the premier class title after Àlex Crivillé, Jorge Lorenzo and Marc Márquez, and the second Mallorcan after Lorenzo. Mir also won the 2017 Moto3 World Championship title with Leopard Racing.

Mir became the first Suzuki rider to win the title since Kenny Roberts Jr. in 2000, the first non-Honda or non-Yamaha rider to win the title since Ducati rider Casey Stoner in 2007, as well as the first Moto3 world champion to win the premier class title. Mir will leave Honda at the end of the 2026 to join Gresini Racing.

== Career ==
=== Early career ===
Palma-born Mir competed for two seasons in the Red Bull MotoGP Rookies Cup in 2013 and 2014, finishing with three wins and six podiums as runner-up to Jorge Martín in 2014. Mir contested the CEV Moto3 Junior World Championship in 2015. Mir won four of the first six races, but faded towards the end of the season, and ultimately finished fourth in the championship.

=== Moto3 World Championship ===
Mir made his Grand Prix début in 2015 with Leopard Racing at Phillip Island replacing the injured Hiroki Ono. Mir started 18th on the grid but failed to finish the race after an incident with John McPhee.

In 2016, Mir competed full-time in the Moto3 World Championship with Leopard Racing, partnering Fabio Quartararo and Andrea Locatelli. He achieved his first Grand Prix pole position and victory in just his 11th start at the Austrian round. He achieved a further two podiums in San Marino and Valencia. Mir finished the championship in fifth position as rookie of the year, scoring 144 points.

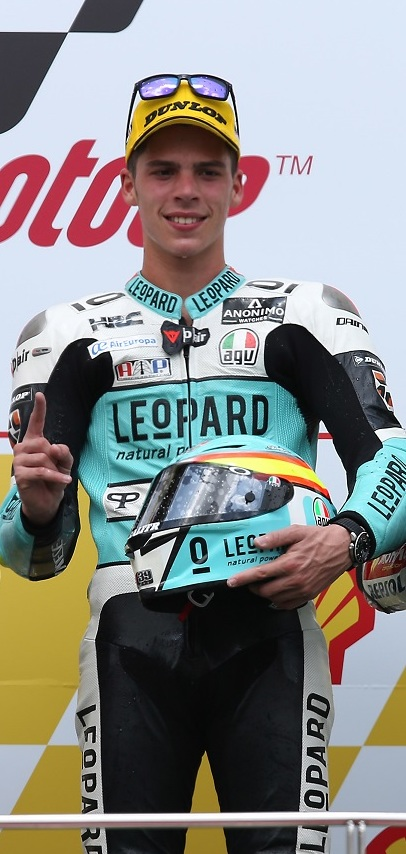
Mir in 2017

Mir remained for a second season in 2017 with Leopard Racing and dominated the class, taking ten wins and 13 podiums from 18 races, only failing to score points at the Japanese round. His only pole position start of the season came at the Malaysian round. He finished 93 points ahead of his nearest rival, Romano Fenati, to win the Moto3 championship.

=== Moto2 World Championship ===
In 2018, Mir moved up to Moto2 with Marc VDS Racing Team, after signing a three-year deal with the team. He finished third in France and Italy, and finished second in Germany and Australia, ending the season with four podiums and 155 points, sixth place in the rider's championship, and winning rookie of the year.

=== MotoGP World Championship ===
==== Team Suzuki Ecstar (2019–2022) ====
===== 2019 =====
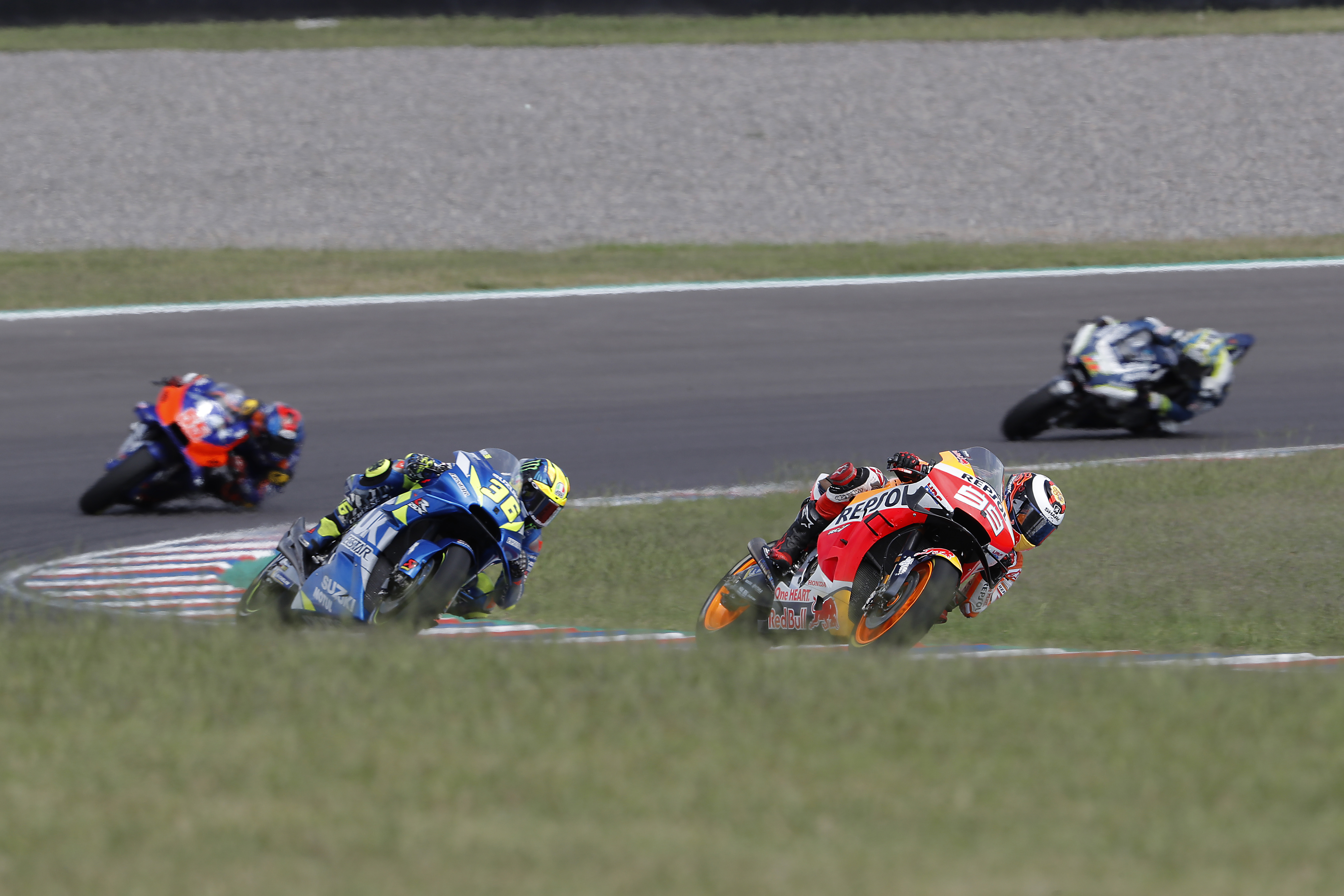
Mir chasing Jorge Lorenzo at the 2019 Argentine Grand Prix

In mid 2018, it was announced that Mir would end his contract with Marc VDS two years prematurely, in order to move up to the premier class with the Suzuki factory team on a two-year deal to replace the outgoing Andrea Iannone. He became just the second rider to be promoted to MotoGP after a lone season in Moto2, after Maverick Viñales. In his rookie season in 2019, he achieved consistent top-ten finishes but missed two rounds due to a pulmonary contusion suffered in a crash in testing at Brno. He was replaced by Suzuki test rider Sylvain Guintoli. Mir achieved a season-best finish of fifth place in Australia. He finished the season with 92 points, 12th in the overall standings, and as the second best rookie, behind former Moto3 Leopard Racing teammate Fabio Quartararo.

===== 2020 =====
Before the delayed start to the 2020 season, Suzuki announced that Mir had been signed for a further two years, ensuring his future with the team through at least 2022. Mir had a rough start to the season, crashing out of two of the first three rounds. However, he quickly found his rhythm and became a consistent podium finisher, achieving a podium spot in five of the next seven rounds (three second places in Austria, Emilia-Romagna and Catalunya, and two third-place finishes in San Marino and Aragon). Inconsistent finishes from his title rivals such as three-time race winner Quartararo and Maverick Viñales meant that after ten of 14 rounds, Mir led the championship standings despite not having won a race until that point.

During the tenth round of the 2020 Grand Prix motorcycle racing season, at the 2020 French motorcycle Grand Prix, Mir lost his balance on entering a left turn during a practice session and slid on his side for about 50 metres before managing to use the momentum as he entered the gravel pit to seamlessly regain his footing and fluidly transfer his momentum into a running action. In the race that followed, Mir finished 11th, scoring five points.

A further podium finish in Teruel and poor results from Quartararo, Viñales and Andrea Dovizioso saw Mir extend his championship advantage to 14 points over second-place Quartararo with three races remaining. At the European Grand Prix, staged at the Circuit Ricardo Tormo near Valencia, Mir took his maiden win, beating his teammate Álex Rins, who finished in second place. With Quartararo falling early in the race and only able to salvage two points, Mir took a commanding 37-point lead over both his rivals with only two rounds remaining. The following week at the Valencian Community Grand Prix at the same circuit, Mir finished in seventh place, while Rins managed only fourth and Quartararo crashed out, crowning Mir the 2020 MotoGP riders' champion, as Team Suzuki Ecstar were also crowned teams' champions for the first and only time in their history. Mir was also Suzuki's first premier class riders' world champion since Kenny Roberts Jr. in 2000, and the first during the MotoGP era.

===== 2021 =====
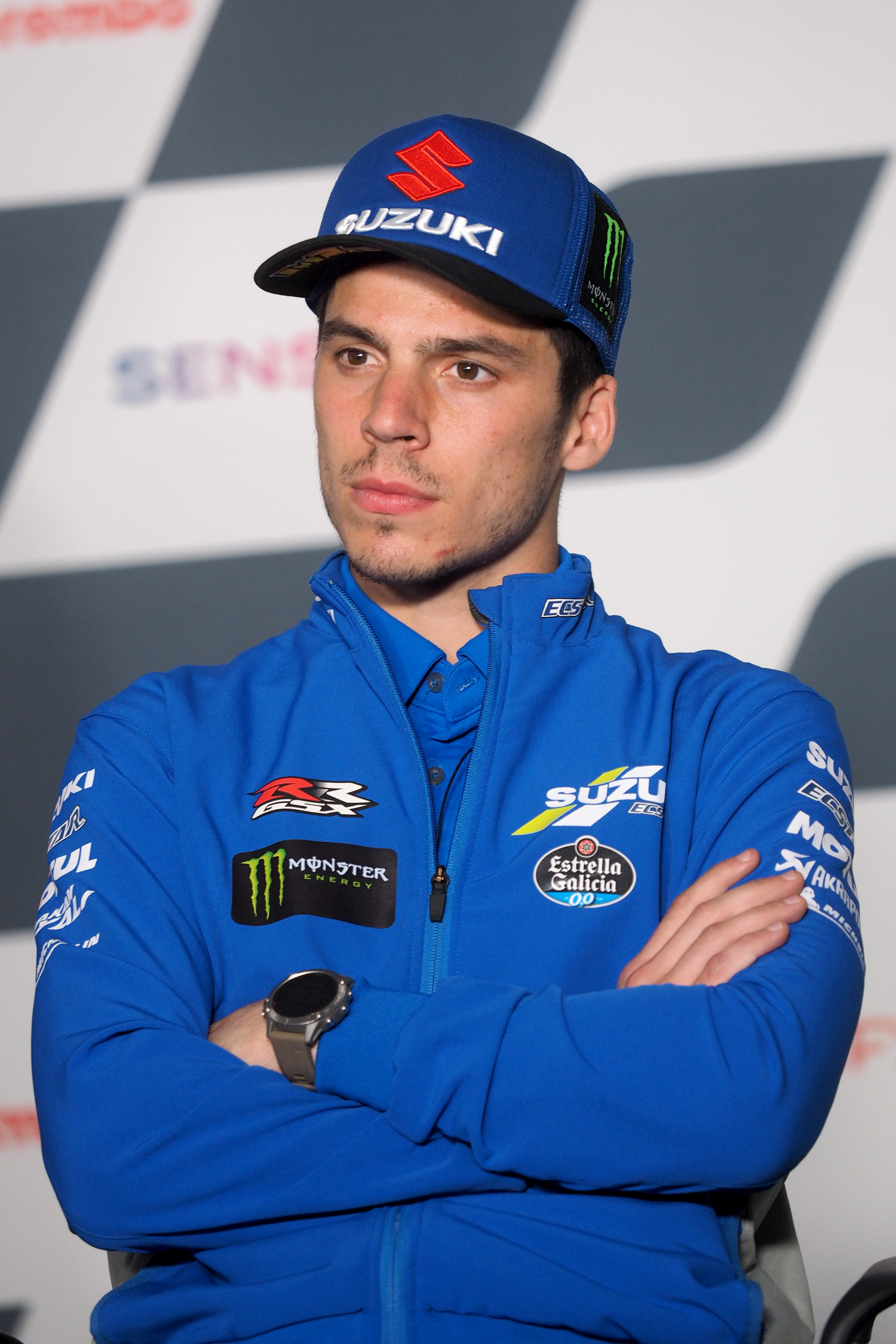
Mir at the 2021 Algarve Grand Prix

Mir started the 2021 season with back to back top ten performances in Qatar. Despite qualifying tenth during the first race and forgetting to engage his Suzuki's launch control at the start, he managed to work his way up into second place on the last lap of the race before getting passed on the back straight by Ducati riders Johann Zarco and Francesco Bagnaia, leading to a fourth-place finish. In the second race the following week, Mir qualified in the middle of the field and finished seventh behind teammate Rins, but the race was most notable for Mir's confrontation with factory Ducati rider, Jack Miller. The confrontation started when Mir attempted an overtake in which he had to pick up his bike mid corner, nearly forcing Miller off the track. Miller later collided with Mir heading down the back straight, and after the race Mir was highly critical of Miller and argued that the Australian's actions were intentional. Two weeks later in Portimao Mir started ninth and worked his way up to finish third behind Fabio Quartararo and Bagnaia, earning Suzuki's first podium for the season. Mir achieved a fifth place at Jerez before a crash at Le Mans in wet conditions, and his second podium in third place in Mugello. Catalunya saw Mir finish in fifth once again, but was promoted to fourth following Fabio Quartararo’s five-second penalty for removing his chest protector and riding with his leathers open. Following a ninth place at Sachsenring, Mir finished third in Assen, earning his third podium of the year, as the season went into the summer break. At the grid returned to race for the double round in Spielberg, Austria, Mir collected his fourth podium of the season with a second-place finish behind rookie Ducati rider Jorge Martín, who took his maiden MotoGP victory. Mir would finish third in Aragón, and replicated his best result of the season with a second-place finish in Portimao, before closing off the year with a fourth-place finish in Valencia, the season ender race. He finished third in the rider's championship with 208 points, 44 points behind Francesco Bagnaia in second, and 70 points behind World Champion Fabio Quartararo.

===== 2022 =====
Mir missed a few rounds due to injuries sustained in Austria. He secured four consecutive top six finishes in the first four rounds but countless DNF’s and injuries in Austria hampered his season, finishing 15th with only 87 points.

==== Repsol Honda Team (2023-2026) ====
Following Suzuki's departure from MotoGP, Mir signed with Repsol Honda for the 2023 season. He partnered six-time premier class champion Marc Márquez. In a lacklustre season for the Honda RC213V, Mir ended 2023 in 22nd place, with his best result being fifth place at the Indian Grand Prix.

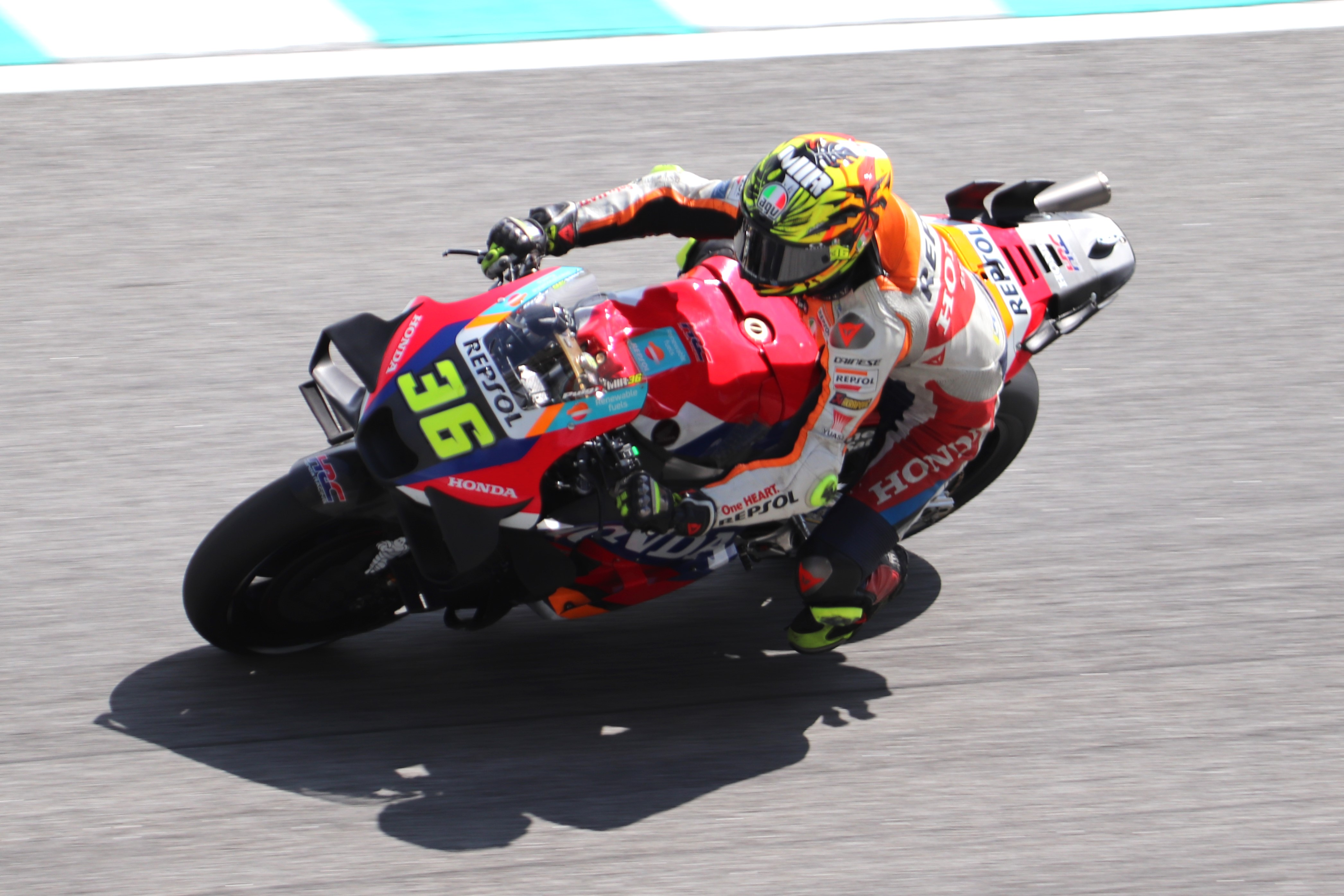
Mir at the 2024 Malaysian Grand Prix

After Márquez's departure after 2023, Mir was partnered alongside Luca Marini for 2024 and 2025. Mir's 2024 was complicated with a struggling machine and constant crashes, as he could only finish 21st in the rider standings. Although the early races of 2025 showed notable improvements in qualifying and race pace, Mir could only manage one feature race finish (ninth in Argentina) in the opening six rounds.

In May 2026, Mir announced his departure from Honda at the end of the 2026 season. He missed the Austrian Grand Prix after falling ill the previous weekend in Misano. He also later missed the Japanese, Indonesian and Australian Grands Prix. He returned at the Malaysian Grand Prix after more than forty days away, but subsequently retired from the race on lap nine due to dizziness stemming from illness; and was replaced by Jake Dixon for the Qatar and Portuguese Grand Prix.

==== Gresini Racing (2027–) ====
In July 2026, Mir signed a two-year deal with Gresini Racing to join the team for the 2027 season, alongside Daniel Holgado. This will mark his first season in the premier class where he does not ride for a factory team.

== Career statistics ==
=== Red Bull MotoGP Rookies Cup ===
==== Races by year ====
(key) (Races in bold indicate pole position, races in italics indicate fastest lap)

Year	1	2	3	4	5	6	7	8	9	10	11	12	13	14	Pos	Pts
2013	AME1; 9	AME2; 18	JER1; 17	JER2; 12	ASS1; 10	ASS2; 11	SAC1; 11	SAC2; 4	BRN; 13	SIL1; 5	SIL2; 2	MIS; 6	ARA1; 4	ARA2; 6	9th	107
2014	JER1; 4	JER1; 1	MUG; Ret	ASS1; 5	ASS2; 9	SAC1; 2	SAC2; 4	BRN1; 5	BRN2; 1	SIL1; 2	SIL2; 5	MIS; 3	ARA1; 1	ARA2; Ret	2nd	197

=== FIM CEV Moto3 Junior World Championship ===
==== Races by year ====
(key) (Races in bold indicate pole position; races in italics indicate fastest lap)

Year	Bike	1	2	3	4	5	6	7	8	9	10	11	12	Pos	Pts
2013	MIR Racing	CAT1	CAT2	ARA	ALB1	ALB2	NAV	VAL1; 26	VAL2; 15	JER				40th	1
2015	Honda	**ALG**; 1	LMS; Ret	**CAT1**; Ret	**CAT2**; 1	**ARA1**; 1	**ARA2**; 1							4th	153
2015	Ioda Honda							ALB; Ret	NAV; 3	JER1; 3	JER2; 23			4th	153
2015	KTM											VAL1; 2	VAL2; 15	4th	153

=== Grand Prix motorcycle racing ===
==== By season ====
Season	Class	Motorcycle	Team	Race	Win	Podium	Pole	FLap	Pts	Plcd	WCh
2015	Moto3	Honda	Leopard Racing	1	0	0	0	0	0	NC	–
2016	Moto3	KTM	Leopard Racing	18	1	3	1	2	144	5th	–
2017	Moto3	Honda	Leopard Racing	18	10	13	1	3	341	**1st**	1
2018	Moto2	Kalex	EG 0,0 Marc VDS	18	0	4	0	1	155	6th	–
2019	MotoGP	Suzuki	Team Suzuki Ecstar	17	0	0	0	0	92	12th	–
2020	MotoGP	Suzuki	Team Suzuki Ecstar	14	1	7	0	0	171	**1st**	1
2021	MotoGP	Suzuki	Team Suzuki Ecstar	18	0	6	0	1	208	**3rd**	–
2022	MotoGP	Suzuki	Team Suzuki Ecstar	16	0	0	0	0	87	15th	–
2023	MotoGP	Honda	Repsol Honda Team	15	0	0	0	0	26	22nd	–
2024	MotoGP	Honda	Repsol Honda Team	19	0	0	0	0	21	21st	–
2025	MotoGP	Honda	Honda HRC Castrol	22	0	2	0	0	96	15th	–
2026	MotoGP	Honda	Honda HRC Castrol	9	0	0	0	0	26*	18th*	–
Total				**185**	**12**	**35**	**2**	**7**	**1367**		**2**

==== By class ====
Class	Seasons	1st GP	1st pod	1st win	Race	Win	Podiums	Pole	FLap	Pts	WChmp
Moto3	2015–2017	2015 Australia	2016 Austria	2016 Austria	37	11	16	2	5	485	1
Moto2	2018	2018 Qatar	2018 France		18	0	4	0	1	155	0
MotoGP	2019–present	2019 Qatar	2020 Austria	2020 Europe	130	1	14	0	1	727	1
Total	2015–present				**185**	**12**	**34**	**2**	**7**	**1367**	**2**

==== Races by year ====
(key) (Races in bold indicate pole position; races in italics indicate fastest lap)

Year	Class	Bike	1	2	3	4	5	6	7	8	9	10	11	12	13	14	15	16	17	18	19	20	21	22	Pos	Pts
2015	Moto3	Honda	QAT	AME	ARG	SPA	FRA	ITA	CAT	NED	GER	IND	CZE	GBR	RSM	ARA	JPN	AUS; Ret	MAL	VAL					NC	0
2016	Moto3	KTM	QAT; 12	ARG; 5	AME; Ret	SPA; 6	FRA; 25	ITA; 7	CAT; 8	NED; 8	GER; Ret	**AUT**; 1	CZE; 8	GBR; 9	RSM; 3	ARA; 5	JPN; 9	AUS; Ret	MAL; Ret	VAL; 2					5th	144
2017	Moto3	Honda	QAT; 1	ARG; 1	AME; 8	SPA; 3	FRA; 1	ITA; 7	CAT; 1	NED; 9	GER; 1	CZE; 1	AUT; 1	GBR; 5	RSM; 2	ARA; 1	JPN; 17	AUS; 1	**MAL**; 1	VAL; 2					1st	341
2018	Moto2	Kalex	QAT; 11	ARG; 7	AME; 4	SPA; 11	FRA; 3	ITA; 3	CAT; Ret	NED; 5	GER; 2	CZE; Ret	AUT; 8	GBR; C	RSM; 5	ARA; 6	THA; Ret	JPN; 11	AUS; 2	MAL; 10	VAL; Ret				6th	155
2019	MotoGP	Suzuki	QAT; 8	ARG; Ret	AME; 17	SPA; Ret	FRA; 16	ITA; 12	CAT; 6	NED; 8	GER; 7	CZE; Ret	AUT	GBR	RSM; 8	ARA; 14	THA; 7	JPN; 8	AUS; 5	MAL; 10	VAL; 7				12th	92
2020	MotoGP	Suzuki	SPA; Ret	ANC; 5	CZE; Ret	AUT; 2	STY; 4	RSM; 3	EMI; 2	CAT; 2	FRA; 11	ARA; 3	TER; 3	EUR; 1	VAL; 7	POR; Ret									1st	171
2021	MotoGP	Suzuki	QAT; 4	DOH; 7	POR; 3	SPA; 5	FRA; Ret	ITA; 3	CAT; 4	GER; 9	NED; 3	STY; 2	AUT; 4	GBR; 9	ARA; 3	RSM; 6	AME; 8	EMI; Ret	ALR; 2	VAL; 4					3rd	208
2022	MotoGP	Suzuki	QAT; 6	INA; 6	ARG; 4	AME; 4	POR; Ret	SPA; 6	FRA; Ret	ITA; Ret	CAT; 4	GER; Ret	NED; 8	GBR; Ret	AUT; Ret	RSM	ARA; DNS	JPN	THA	AUS; 18	MAL; 19	VAL; 6			15th	87
2023	MotoGP	Honda	POR; 11	ARG; DNS	AME; Ret	SPA; Ret	FRA; Ret	ITA; DNS	GER	NED	GBR; Ret	AUT; Ret	CAT; 17	RSM; Ret	IND; 5	JPN; 12	INA; Ret	AUS; Ret	THA; 12	MAL; Ret	QAT; 14	VAL; DNS			22nd	26
2024	MotoGP	Honda	QAT; 13	POR; 12	AME; Ret	SPA; 12^{9}	FRA; Ret	CAT; 15	ITA; Ret	NED; Ret	GER; 18	GBR; Ret	AUT; 17	ARA; 14	RSM; WD	EMI; 11	INA; Ret	JPN; Ret	AUS; Ret	THA; 15	MAL; Ret	SLD; Ret			21st	21
2025	MotoGP	Honda	THA; Ret^{9}	ARG; 9^{8}	AME; Ret	QAT; Ret	SPA; Ret^{9}	FRA; Ret^{9}	GBR; 10	ARA; 7	ITA; 11	NED; Ret	GER; Ret	CZE; Ret	AUT; 6	HUN; Ret^{6}	CAT; 12	RSM; Ret	JPN; 3^{4}	INA; Ret^{5}	AUS; Ret	MAL; 3	POR; Ret	VAL; 13	15th	96
2026	MotoGP	Honda	THA; Ret^{7}	BRA; Ret	USA; Ret	SPA; 15	FRA; Ret^{6}	CAT; 13	ITA; 12	HUN; Ret	CZE; 5	NED; Ret	GER; Ret	GBR; Ret^{6}	ARA; 12	RSM; Ret	AUT	JPN	INA	AUS	MAL; Ret	QAT	POR	VAL	18th*	33*

* Season still in progress.
