= Manuel Pagliani =

Italian motorcycle racer

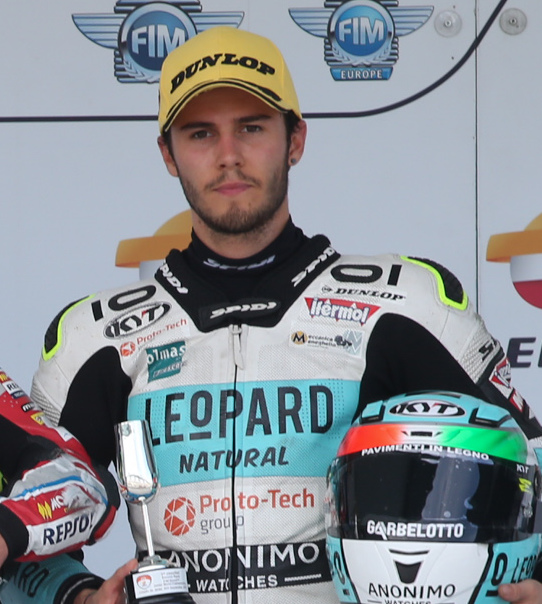
- Pagliani in 2018
- Nationality: Italian
- Born: 16 July 1996 (age 30); Camposampiero, Italy
Motorcycle racing career statistics
Moto3 World Championship
Active years	2015, 2017–2018
Manufacturers	Mahindra, Honda
Championships	0
2018 championship position	34th (6 pts)
Starts / Wins / Podiums / Poles / F. laps / Points; 24 / 0 / 0 / 0 / 0 / 17

Manuel Pagliani (born 16 July 1996 in Camposampiero) is an Italian former motorcycle racer. In 2013 and 2014, he was a competitor of the Red Bull MotoGP Rookies Cup; in the latter year he was also the CIV Moto3 champion. In 2016, he won the CIV Moto3 Championship for the second time.

== Career statistics ==
2015 - NC, European Superstock 600 Championship #96 MV Agusta F3 675

=== CEV Buckler Moto3 Championship ===
==== Races by year ====
(key) (Races in bold indicate pole position, races in italics indicate fastest lap)

Year	Bike	1	2	3	4	5	6	7	8	9	Pos	Pts
2013	Honda	CAT1	CAT2	ARA	ALB1; 8	ALB2	NAV	VAL1	VAL1	JER; 15	26th	9

=== Red Bull MotoGP Rookies Cup ===
==== Races by year ====
(key) (Races in bold indicate pole position, races in italics indicate fastest lap)

Year	1	2	3	4	5	6	7	8	9	10	11	12	13	14	Pos	Pts
2013	AME1; 4	AME2; 2	JER1; Ret	JER2; Ret	ASS1; 17	ASS2; 12	SAC1; 4	SAC2; 2	BRN; 2	SIL1; 7	SIL2; 4	MIS; 1	ARA1; Ret	ARA2; Ret	6th	137
2014	**JER1**; 3	**JER1**; 2	MUG; 2	ASS1; Ret	ASS2; 7	SAC1; Ret	SAC2; Ret	**BRN1**; 2	**BRN2**; Ret	SIL1; 4	SIL2; 8	MIS; 2	ARA1; 8	ARA2; Ret	5th	134

=== FIM European Superstock 600 ===
==== Races by year ====
(key) (Races in bold indicate pole position, races in italics indicate fastest lap)

Year	Bike	1	2	3	4	5	6	7	8	Pos	Pts
2015	MV Agusta	SPA; 25	SPA; 25	NED; Ret	ITA; 26	POR	ITA	SPA	FRA	NC	0

=== FIM CEV Moto3 Junior World Championship ===
==== Races by year ====
(key) (Races in bold indicate pole position, races in italics indicate fastest lap)

Year	Bike	1	2	3	4	5	6	7	8	9	10	11	12	Pos	Pts
2016	GEO	VAL1	VAL2	LMS	ARA; 24	CAT1	CAT2	ALB	ALG	JER1	JER2	VAL1	VAL2	NC	0
2018	Honda	**EST**; 1	VAL1; 13	VAL2; 2	FRA; 6	**CAT1**; 4	**CAT2**; 1	ARA; Ret	JER1; 5	JER2; 3	ALB; 8	VAL1	VAL2	3rd	131

=== Grand Prix motorcycle racing ===
==== By season ====
Season	Class	Motorcycle	Team	Race	Win	Podium	Pole	FLap	Pts	Plcd
2015	Moto3	Mahindra	San Carlo Team Italia	5	0	0	0	0	3	32nd
2017	Moto3	Mahindra	CIP	18	0	0	0	0	8	29th
2018	Moto3	Honda	Leopard Junior Team	1	0	0	0	0	6	34th
Total				**24**	**0**	**0**	**0**	**0**	**17**	

==== Races by year ====
(key) (Races in bold indicate pole position, races in italics indicate fastest lap)

Year	Class	Bike	1	2	3	4	5	6	7	8	9	10	11	12	13	14	15	16	17	18	19	Pos	Pts
2015	Moto3	Mahindra	QAT	AME	ARG	SPA	FRA	ITA	CAT	NED	GER	INP	CZE	GBR	RSM	ARA; Ret	JPN; 22	AUS; 13	MAL; Ret	VAL; 25		32nd	3
2017	Moto3	Mahindra	QAT; 22	ARG; 21	AME; 25	SPA; 27	FRA; 18	ITA; 22	CAT; 20	NED; Ret	GER; 20	CZE; 25	AUT; 19	GBR; 15	RSM; 11	ARA; 23	JPN; Ret	AUS; 15	MAL; 15	VAL; 22		29th	8
2018	Moto3	Honda	QAT	ARG	AME	SPA	FRA	ITA; 10	CAT	NED	GER	CZE	AUT	GBR	RSM	ARA	THA	JPN	AUS	MAL	VAL	34th	6
