= Red Bull MotoGP Rookies Cup =

Motorcycle race series

- Category: Motorcycle sport
- Region: Europe
- Inaugural season: 2007
- Riders' champion: (Spain) Brian Uriarte
- Official website: www.redbullrookiescup.com

The Red Bull MotoGP Rookies Cup is a motorcycle racing series contested by young, up-and-coming motorcycle riders, who have not had experience in a motorcycle grand prix previously. The class was founded in 2007, and since then a number of the rookies have progressed through to the 125cc/Moto3 championship in MotoGP.

Prior to the 2013 season, a 2-stroke KTM RC 125cc engine was used. The year 2013 saw a change of machinery to the 4-stroke KTM RC250RBR, following the introduction of the four-stroke Moto3 class.

The Rookies Cup staff include Rider Coaches August "Gustl" Auinger and Dani Ribalta with Peter Clifford being the Director of Rider Development and Media.

== Alumni ==
=== World Champions ===
33 ex Rookies have gone on to win at least one World Championship as of 2026:

Rider	World championship
(France) Johann Zarco	2015 Moto2, 2016 Moto2
(United Kingdom) Danny Kent	2015 Moto3
(Italy) Lorenzo Savadori	2015 Superstock 1000
(South Africa) Brad Binder	2016 Moto3
(Spain) Marc García	2017 Supersport 300
(Spain) Joan Mir	2017 Moto3, 2020 MotoGP
(Spain) Jorge Martín	2018 Moto3, 2024 MotoGP
(France) Alan Techer	2017–18 FIM Endurance World Championship
(Australia) Josh Hook	2017–18 FIM Endurance World Championship, 2022 FIM Endurance World Championship
(Spain) Raúl Fernández	2018 FIM CEV Moto3 Junior
(Spain) Manuel González	2019 Supersport 300
(Spain) Izan Guevara	2020 FIM CEV Moto3 Junior, 2022 Moto3
(Italy) Enea Bastianini	2020 Moto2
(Spain) Adrián Huertas	2021 Supersport 300, 2024 Supersport
(Spain) Pedro Acosta	2021 Moto3, 2023 Moto2
(Turkey) Toprak Razgatlıoğlu	2021 Superbike, 2024 Superbike, 2025 Superbike
(Spain) Daniel Holgado	2021 FIM CEV Moto3 Junior
(Spain) José Antonio Rueda	2022 FIM JuniorGP, 2025 Moto3
(Spain) Ángel Piqueras	2023 FIM JuniorGP
(Czech Republic) Karel Hanika	2023 FIM Endurance World Championship, 2025 FIM Endurance World Championship
(Spain) Jaume Masià	2023 Moto3
(Italy) Mattia Casadei	2023 MotoE
(Colombia) David Alonso	2024 Moto3
(Japan) Ai Ogura	2024 Moto2
(Spain) Álvaro Carpe	2024 FIM JuniorGP
(Italy) Stefano Manzi	2025 Supersport
(Spain) Beñat Fernández	2025 Supersport 300
(Spain) Brian Uriarte	2025 FIM JuniorGP
(Brazil) Diogo Moreira	2025 Moto2
(Germany) Markus Reiterberger	2026 FIM Endurance World Championship
(Spain) Máximo Quiles	2026 Moto3
(Spain) Xavier Artigas	2026 Sportbike
(Spain) Carlos Cano	2026 FIM JuniorGP

The Spaniards José Antonio Rueda, Ángel Piqueras, Álvaro Carpe and Brian Uriarte have all won the Rookies Cup and the FIM Moto3 Junior World Championship in the same year.

=== Moto GP riders ===
So far, 11 ex Rookie riders have started a race in the MotoGP class as of 2024 (active riders in bold):

Rider	First race weekend in MotoGP	First pole position in MotoGP	First podium in MotoGP	First win in MotoGP	Race Starts	Teams
(France) **Johann Zarco**	Qatar 2017	Netherlands 2017	France 2017 (GP - 2nd)	Australia 2023 (GP)	143 (GP)	(France) Tech3 Racing (2017-18) (Austria) KTM Factory Racing (2019) (Monaco) LCR Team (2019) (Spain) Esponsorama Racing (2020) (Italy) Pramac Racing (2021-2023) (Monaco) **LCR Team** (2024-)
(France) **Johann Zarco**	Qatar 2017	Netherlands 2017	No podiums (S)	No wins (S)	38 (S)	(France) Tech3 Racing (2017-18) (Austria) KTM Factory Racing (2019) (Monaco) LCR Team (2019) (Spain) Esponsorama Racing (2020) (Italy) Pramac Racing (2021-2023) (Monaco) **LCR Team** (2024-)
(Spain) **Joan Mir**	Qatar 2019	No poles	Austria 2020 (GP - 2nd)	Europe 2020 (GP)	98 (GP)	(Japan) Team Suzuki Ecstar (2019-22) (Japan) **Repsol Honda** (2023-)
(Spain) **Joan Mir**	Qatar 2019	No poles	No podiums (S)	No wins (S)	34 (S)	(Japan) Team Suzuki Ecstar (2019-22) (Japan) **Repsol Honda** (2023-)
(Portugal) **Miguel Oliveira**	Qatar 2019	Portugal 2020	Styria 2020 (GP - 1st)	Styria 2020 (GP)	98 (GP)	(France) Tech3 Racing (2019-20) (Austria) KTM Factory Racing (2021-22) (Malaysia) RNF MotoGP Racing (2023) (United States) **Trackhouse Racing** (2024-)
(Portugal) **Miguel Oliveira**	Qatar 2019	Portugal 2020	No podiums (S)	No wins (S)	30 (S)	(France) Tech3 Racing (2019-20) (Austria) KTM Factory Racing (2021-22) (Malaysia) RNF MotoGP Racing (2023) (United States) **Trackhouse Racing** (2024-)
(South Africa) **Brad Binder**	Spain 2020	No poles	(Czech Republic) Czechia 2020 (GP - 1st)	(Czech Republic) Czechia 2020 (GP)	90 (GP)	(Austria) **KTM Factory Racing** (2020-)
(South Africa) **Brad Binder**	Spain 2020	No poles	Argentina 2023 (S - 1st)	Argentina 2023 (S)	37 (S)	(Austria) **KTM Factory Racing** (2020-)
(Italy) **Lorenzo Savadori**	Europe 2020	No poles	No podiums	No wins	21 (GP)	(Italy) Gresini Racing (2019-20) (Test Rider) (Italy) Gresini Racing (2020-21) (Italy) **Aprilia Factory Racing** (2022-) (Test Rider)
(Italy) **Lorenzo Savadori**	Europe 2020	No poles	No podiums	No wins	4 (S)	(Italy) Gresini Racing (2019-20) (Test Rider) (Italy) Gresini Racing (2020-21) (Italy) **Aprilia Factory Racing** (2022-) (Test Rider)
(Italy) **Enea Bastianini**	Qatar 2021	Austria 2022	San Marino 2021 (GP - 3rd)	Qatar 2022 (GP)	69 (GP)	(Spain) Esponsorama Racing (2021) (Italy) Gresini Racing (2022) (Italy) **Ducati Corse** (2023-)
(Italy) **Enea Bastianini**	Qatar 2021	Austria 2022	No podiums (S)	No wins (S)	31 (S)	(Spain) Esponsorama Racing (2021) (Italy) Gresini Racing (2022) (Italy) **Ducati Corse** (2023-)
(Spain) **Jorge Martín**	Qatar 2021	(Qatar) Doha 2021	(Qatar) Doha 2021 (GP - 3rd)	Styria 2021 (GP)	73 (GP)	(Italy) **Pramac Racing** (2021-2024) (Italy) **Aprilia Factory Racing** (2025-2026)
(Spain) **Jorge Martín**	Qatar 2021	(Qatar) Doha 2021	Portugal 2023 (S - 2nd)	France 2023 (S)	38 (S)	(Italy) **Pramac Racing** (2021-2024) (Italy) **Aprilia Factory Racing** (2025-2026)
(South Africa) Darryn Binder	Qatar 2022	No poles	No podiums	No wins	20 (GP)	(Malaysia) RNF MotoGP Racing (2022)
(South Africa) Darryn Binder	Qatar 2022	No poles	No podiums	No wins	0 (S)	(Malaysia) RNF MotoGP Racing (2022)
(Italy) **Fabio Di Giannantonio**	Qatar 2022	Italy 2022	Australia 2023 (GP - 3rd)	Qatar 2023 (GP)	57 (GP)	(Italy) Gresini Racing (2022-2023) (Italy) **VR46 Racing Team** (2024-)
(Italy) **Fabio Di Giannantonio**	Qatar 2022	Italy 2022	Qatar 2023 (S - 2nd)	No wins (S)	36 (S)	(Italy) Gresini Racing (2022-2023) (Italy) **VR46 Racing Team** (2024-)
(Spain) **Raúl Fernández**	Qatar 2022	No poles	No podiums	No wins	58 (GP)	(France) Tech3 Racing (2022) (Malaysia) RNF MotoGP Racing (2023) (United States) **Trackhouse Racing** (2024-)
(Spain) **Raúl Fernández**	Qatar 2022	No poles	No podiums	No wins	37 (S)	(France) Tech3 Racing (2022) (Malaysia) RNF MotoGP Racing (2023) (United States) **Trackhouse Racing** (2024-)
(Spain) **Pedro Acosta**	Qatar 2024	Japan 2024	Portugal 2024 (GP - 3rd)	No wins	18 (GP)	**(France) Tech3 Racing** (2024)
(Spain) **Pedro Acosta**	Qatar 2024	Japan 2024	Spain 2024 (S - 2nd)	No wins	19 (S)	**(France) Tech3 Racing** (2024)

- Data correct as of November 8 2024

== Scoring system ==
Points are awarded to the top fifteen finishers. A rider has to finish the race to earn points.

Position	1st	2nd	3rd	4th	5th	6th	7th	8th	9th	10th	11th	12th	13th	14th	15th
Points	25	20	16	13	11	10	9	8	7	6	5	4	3	2	1

- Each rider's lowest score discounted. (2007-08 Only)

== Bike Spec ==
Rookies Cup KTM RC250RBR Technical Details
Manufacturer	KTM	
Configuration	Single-cylinder	
Displacement	249.5 ccm	
Combustion	4-stroke	
Valve Train	DOHC	
Power Output	min. 37 kilowatts (50 hp) at 13.000 rpm	
Rev Limit	13,500 rpm	
Tank Capacity	~11 liters	
Frame	Tubular steel with adjustable headstock and swing arm pivot	
Dry Weight	approx. 80.5 kg	
Suspension	Front	Rear
Suspension	WP / DM 35 mm, RCMA3548	WP / BAVP 4618, adjustable length, hydraulic preload
Rims	Front	Rear
Rims	OZ Forged Aluminium 2.5 x 17	OZ Forged Aluminium 3.5 x 17
Tires	Front	Rear
Tires	Dunlop 95/70-17	Dunlop 115/70-17
Brakes	Front	Rear
Brakes	Brembo Radial caliper, 290 mm GALFER single floating Disc Wave® rotor	Formula brake system, 190mm GALFER fixed Disc Wave® rotor

== Results ==
Season	Races	Champion	Points	Runner up	Points	Third place	Points
2007	8	(France) Johann Zarco	159	(Italy) Lorenzo Savadori	102	(United Kingdom) Matthew Hoyle	96
2008	10	(United States) J. D. Beach	149	(Spain) Luis Salom	145	(Norway) Sturla Fagerhaug	142
2009	8	(Czech Republic) Jakub Kornfeil	132	(Norway) Sturla Fagerhaug	130	(Japan) Daijiro Hiura	104
2010	10	(United States) Jacob Gagne	170	(United Kingdom) Danny Kent	164	(Japan) Daijiro Hiura	125
2011	14	(Italy) Lorenzo Baldassarri	208	(Australia) Arthur Sissis	199	(France) Alan Techer	162
2012	15	(Germany) Florian Alt	233	(Netherlands) Scott Deroue	177	(Czech Republic) Karel Hanika	162
2013	14	(Czech Republic) Karel Hanika	235	(Spain) Jorge Martín	163	(Italy) Stefano Manzi	154
2014	14	(Spain) Jorge Martín	254	(Spain) Joan Mir	197	(Italy) Stefano Manzi	193
2015	13	(Netherlands) Bo Bendsneyder	243	(Italy) Fabio Di Giannantonio	194	(Japan) Ayumu Sasaki	161
2016	13	(Japan) Ayumu Sasaki	250	(Spain) Aleix Viu	201	(Spain) Raúl Fernández	195
2017	13	(Japan) Kazuki Masaki	194	(Spain) Aleix Viu	183	(Turkey) Can Öncü	165
2018	12	(Turkey) Can Öncü	235	(Turkey) Deniz Öncü	192	(Spain) Xavier Artigas	166
2019	12	(Spain) Carlos Tatay	194	(Spain) Pedro Acosta	162	(Japan) Haruki Noguchi	151
2020	12	(Spain) Pedro Acosta	214	(Spain) David Muñoz	150	(Spain) Iván Ortolá	150
2021	14	(Colombia) David Alonso	248	(Spain) David Muñoz	211	(Spain) Daniel Holgado	190
2022	14	(Spain) José Antonio Rueda	224	(Netherlands) Collin Veijer	210	(Spain) Máximo Quiles	189
2023	14	(Spain) Ángel Piqueras	318	(Spain) Álvaro Carpe	203	(Spain) Máximo Quiles	167
2024	14	(Spain) Álvaro Carpe	232	(Spain) Brian Uriarte	230	(Argentina) Valentín Perrone	206
2025	14	(Spain) Brian Uriarte	236	(Indonesia) Veda Pratama	181	(Malaysia) Hakim Danish	171
2026	14	(Spain) Beñat Fernández	175	(Spain) Fernando Bujosa	170	(Japan) Ryota Ogiwara	159

== Records ==
Description	Record	Details
Most race wins (total)	11 wins	(Spain) Ángel Piqueras (2022 - 2023)
Most race wins in a season	9 wins	(Spain) Ángel Piqueras (2023)
Most consecutive race wins	6 wins	(Spain) Pedro Acosta (2020)
Most podium finishes (total)	17 podiums	(Czech Republic) Karel Hanika (2012 - 2013) (Turkey) Can Öncü (2017 - 2018)
Most podium finishes in a season	11 podiums	(Japan) Ayumu Sasaki (2016)
Most consecutive podium finishes	10 podiums	(Turkey) Can Öncü (2018)
Most points (total)	417 points	(Spain) Jorge Martín (2013 - 2014)
Most points in a season	254 points	(Spain) Jorge Martín (2014)
Most pole positions (total)	10 pole positions	(Czech Republic) Karel Hanika (2012 - 2013)
Most pole positions in a season	6 pole positions	(Czech Republic) Karel Hanika (2013)
