= 2014 Red Bull MotoGP Rookies Cup =

Motorcycle racing competition

2014 Red Bull MotoGP Rookies Cup season

Seasons
- ← 2013 2015 →

The 2014 Red Bull MotoGP Rookies Cup season was the eighth season of the Red Bull MotoGP Rookies Cup. After pre-season testing at Ciudad del Motor de Aragón, the season began at Jerez on 3 May and ended on 28 September at the Ciudad del Motor de Aragón after 14 races. The races, for the second year contested by the riders on equal KTM 250cc 4-stroke Moto3 bikes, were held at eight meetings on the Grand Prix motorcycle racing calendar.

Spanish riders Jorge Martín and Joan Mir won 9 of the season's 14 races between them – 6 for Martín and 3 for Mir – with Martín prevailing as champion. Martín finished each of the first five races on the podium, including a win at Mugello, and also had a spell of four wins in five races mid-season before clinching the championship in the final meeting. Mir finished as the season's runner-up by just four points ahead of Italy's Stefano Manzi, who took nine podium finishes during the season – including six third-place finishes – but only a single victory, at Misano. Other race victories were taken by Soushi Mihara, who won two races, as well as single victories for Toprak Razgatlıoğlu and Bo Bendsneyder; of the trio, Razgatlıoğlu was best placed in the championship, in sixth position.

== Calendar ==
2014 calendar
Round	Date	Circuit	Pole position	Fastest lap	Race winner	Sources
1	3 May	(Spain) Jerez	(Italy) Manuel Pagliani	(South Africa) Darryn Binder	(Japan) Soushi Mihara	
1	4 May	(Spain) Jerez	(Italy) Manuel Pagliani	(Spain) Joan Mir	(Spain) Joan Mir	
2	31 May	(Italy) Mugello	(Spain) Jorge Martín	(Italy) Stefano Manzi	(Spain) Jorge Martín	
3	27 June	(Netherlands) Assen	(Netherlands) Bo Bendsneyder	(Netherlands) Bo Bendsneyder	(Japan) Soushi Mihara	
3	28 June	(Netherlands) Assen	(Netherlands) Bo Bendsneyder	(Italy) Manuel Pagliani	(Netherlands) Bo Bendsneyder	
4	12 July	(Germany) Sachsenring	(Australia) Olly Simpson	(Italy) Manuel Pagliani	(Turkey) Toprak Razgatlıoğlu	
4	13 July	(Germany) Sachsenring	(Australia) Olly Simpson	(Spain) Jorge Martín	(Spain) Jorge Martín	
5	16 August	(Czech Republic) Brno	(Italy) Manuel Pagliani	(Spain) Jorge Martín	(Spain) Jorge Martín	
5	17 August	(Czech Republic) Brno	(Italy) Manuel Pagliani	(Spain) Marc García	(Spain) Joan Mir	
6	30 August	(United Kingdom) Silverstone	(Spain) Jorge Martín	(Italy) Manuel Pagliani	(Spain) Jorge Martín	
6	31 August	(United Kingdom) Silverstone	(Spain) Jorge Martín	(Spain) Jorge Martín	(Spain) Jorge Martín	
7	13 September	(San Marino) Misano	(Spain) Jorge Martín	(Italy) Manuel Pagliani	(Italy) Stefano Manzi	
8	27 September	Aragon	(Spain) Jorge Martín	(United Kingdom) Bradley Ray	(Spain) Joan Mir	
8	28 September	Aragon	(Spain) Jorge Martín	(Spain) Jorge Martín	(Spain) Jorge Martín	

== Entry list ==
2014 entry list
No.	Rider	Rounds
2	(Italy) Fabio Di Giannantonio	All
5	(Spain) Jaume Masiá	1–7
6	(France) Corentin Perolari	1–3, 5–8
7	(Germany) Aris Michail	All
9	(Netherlands) Robert Schotman	All
12	(Martinique) Lyvann Luchel	All
13	(Czech Republic) Martin Gbelec	All
14	(Italy) Brunopalazzese Ieraci	All
17	(Spain) Óscar Gutiérrez	All
21	(South Africa) Hanro van Rooyen	1–5, 8
28	(United Kingdom) Bradley Ray	All
29	(Italy) Stefano Manzi	All
36	(Spain) Joan Mir	All
40	(South Africa) Darryn Binder	All
41	(Spain) Marc García	All
45	(Australia) Olly Simpson	All
54	(Turkey) Toprak Razgatlıoğlu	All
64	(Netherlands) Bo Bendsneyder	1–3, 5–8
74	(Japan) Soushi Mihara	All
76	(Russia) Makar Yurchenko	1, 5, 7–8
88	(Spain) Jorge Martín	All
94	(France) Simon Danilo	All
96	(Italy) Manuel Pagliani	All
99	(France) Enzo Boulom	All

== Championship standings ==
Points were awarded to the top fifteen riders, provided the rider finished the race.

Position	1st	2nd	3rd	4th	5th	6th	7th	8th	9th	10th	11th	12th	13th	14th	15th
Points	25	20	16	13	11	10	9	8	7	6	5	4	3	2	1

Pos.	Rider	JER (Spain)		MUG (Italy)	ASS (Netherlands)		SAC (Germany)		BRN (Czech Republic)		SIL (United Kingdom)		MIS (San Marino)	ARA (Aragon)		Pts
1	(Spain) Jorge Martín	2	3	**1**	2	2	12	1	1	Ret	**1**	**1**	**5**	**4**	**1**	254
2	(Spain) Joan Mir	4	1	Ret	5	9	2	4	5	1	2	5	3	1	Ret	197
3	(Italy) Stefano Manzi	5	4	3	Ret	3	3	Ret	3	3	3	2	1	2	8	193
4	(United Kingdom) Bradley Ray	9	11	Ret	3	6	6	2	4	4	5	4	7	7	3	152
5	(Italy) Manuel Pagliani	**3**	**2**	2	Ret	7	Ret	Ret	**2**	**Ret**	4	8	2	8	Ret	134
6	(Turkey) Toprak Razgatlıoğlu	11	8	5	12	10	1	3	16	9	9	Ret	4	6	5	123
7	(Japan) Soushi Mihara	1	9	6	1	5	4	Ret	7	13	16	9	13	15	10	120
8	(Italy) Fabio Di Giannantonio	14	14	7	9	8	8	5	8	2	8	6	6	3	16	119
9	(Netherlands) Bo Bendsneyder	8	6	12	**4**	**1**			13	Ret	6	3	8	5	7	117
10	(Spain) Marc García	13	16	11	8	16	9	7	6	5	11	15	12	11	2	88
11	(Australia) Olly Simpson	10	10	4	Ret	4	**Ret**	**Ret**	9	11	Ret	7	15	9	Ret	67
12	(Spain) Óscar Gutiérrez	Ret	7	15	7	14	5	Ret	14	10	7	Ret	9	10	Ret	62
13	(South Africa) Darryn Binder	6	5	Ret	10	11	Ret	13	18	Ret	10	12	DNS	13	9	55
14	(Germany) Aris Michail	Ret	17	9	Ret	Ret	7	6	19	7	17	10	18	17	6	51
15	(France) Enzo Boulom	16	15	14	Ret	19	13	14	10	6	15	Ret	10	14	11	38
16	(France) Corentin Perolari	DNS	DNS	10	6	Ret			12	16	12	Ret	16	18	4	37
17	(Spain) Jaume Masiá	7	13	Ret	Ret	12	Ret	8	11	8	DNS	DNS	DNS			37
18	(Italy) Bruno Ieraci	12	12	8	Ret	15	11	11	23	14	Ret	Ret	11	21	13	37
19	(Netherlands) Robert Schotman	15	18	17	Ret	13	14	10	15	15	13	11	14	12	Ret	28
20	(France) Simon Danilo	17	21	Ret	11	18	10	9	20	17	14	14	19	19	12	26
21	(Czech Republic) Martin Gbelec	Ret	19	13	13	17	Ret	12	17	12	19	13	17	16	15	18
22	(Martinique) Lyvann Luchel	20	22	18	15	20	15	15	24	20	18	16	21	20	14	5
23	(South Africa) Hanro van Rooyen	19	Ret	16	14	Ret	Ret	16	21	19				23	Ret	2
	(Russia) Makar Yurchenko	18	20						22	18			20	22	Ret	0
Pos.	Rider	JER (Spain)		MUG (Italy)	ASS (Netherlands)		SAC (Germany)		BRN (Czech Republic)		SIL (United Kingdom)		MIS (San Marino)	ARA (Aragon)		Pts

Colour	Result
Gold	Winner
Silver	Second place
Bronze	Third place
Green	Points classification
Blue	Non-points classification
Blue	Non-classified finish (NC)
Purple	Retired, not classified (Ret)
Red	Did not qualify (DNQ)
Red	Did not pre-qualify (DNPQ)
Black	Disqualified (DSQ)
White	Did not start (DNS)
White	Withdrew (WD)
White	Race cancelled (C)
Blank	Did not practice (DNP)
Blank	Did not arrive (DNA)
Blank	Excluded (EX)

**Bold** – Pole position
Italics – Fastest lap
