= 2015 Australian motorcycle Grand Prix =

(Australia) 2015 Australian Grand Prix
Race details
- Race 16 of 18 races in the 2015 Grand Prix motorcycle racing season
- Date: 18 October 2015
- Official name: Pramac Australian Motorcycle Grand Prix
- Location: Phillip Island Grand Prix Circuit
- Course: Permanent racing facility; 4.448 km (2.764 mi)

MotoGP
Pole position
Rider	(Spain) Marc Márquez	Honda
Time	1:28.364	
Fastest lap
Rider	(Spain) Marc Márquez	Honda
Time	1:29.280 on lap 27	
Podium
First	(Spain) Marc Márquez	Honda
Second	(Spain) Jorge Lorenzo	Yamaha
Third	(Italy) Andrea Iannone	Ducati

Moto2
Pole position
Rider	(Spain) Álex Rins	Kalex
Time	1:32.523	
Fastest lap
Rider	(Spain) Álex Rins	Kalex
Time	1:32.880 on lap 10	
Podium
First	(Spain) Álex Rins	Kalex
Second	(United Kingdom) Sam Lowes	Speed Up
Third	(Italy) Lorenzo Baldassarri	Kalex

Moto3
Pole position
Rider	(United Kingdom) Danny Kent (Note: Danny Kent, who set the fastest time in qualifying, received a grid penalty which promoted John McPhee to the pole position grid slot.)	Honda
Time	1:36.180	
Fastest lap
Rider	(Italy) Francesco Bagnaia	Mahindra
Time	1:36.532 on lap 3	
Podium
First	(Portugal) Miguel Oliveira	KTM
Second	(Spain) Efrén Vázquez	Honda
Third	(South Africa) Brad Binder	KTM

The 2015 Australian motorcycle Grand Prix was the sixteenth round of the 2015 MotoGP season. It was held at the Phillip Island Grand Prix Circuit in Phillip Island on Sunday 18 October 2015.

In his 130th start, Marc Márquez achieved his 50th Grand Prix win – becoming the ninth rider to reach that mark, and the youngest to do so, at 22 years, 243 days – with a final-lap pass on Jorge Lorenzo. The final podium position was taken by Andrea Iannone, despite striking a seagull during the early laps. With Valentino Rossi finishing in fourth place, Lorenzo cut the championship lead to eleven points with two races remaining. With Lorenzo's result, Yamaha clinched their first title for constructors championship; their first title since 2010. The race is considered to be one of the best in MotoGP history, many praising the battle between the top four riders as thrilling and unpredictable.

In the lower classes, Álex Rins took his second Moto2 victory of the season, finishing clear of Sam Lowes and Lorenzo Baldassarri; Baldassarri's result was his first podium finish in Grand Prix racing. In Moto3, Miguel Oliveira's fourth victory of 2015 maintained his mathematical chance of claiming the world championship title. Efrén Vázquez finished in second place ahead of Oliveira's teammate Brad Binder. Championship leader Danny Kent crashed out of the race, which meant that Oliveira reduced the championship lead to 40.

== Report ==
=== Background ===
The Pramac Australian Motorcycle Grand Prix was announced as the 16th race of the 2015 MotoGP championship by the global motorsporting body FIM in September 2014, with the race being conducted a week after the Japanese Grand Prix and a week before the race in Sepang, Malaysia. It was the 26th season that Grand Prix motorcycle racing has conducted a race in Australia and the 20th race conducted at the Phillip Island Grand Prix Circuit in Victoria. After the race in Japan from the previous week, Valentino Rossi was leading the championship 18 points ahead of his teammate Jorge Lorenzo, Marc Marquez was 86 points behind Rossi and was mathematically out of championship contention going into Australia, with 75 points on offer in the final three races of the season. Dani Pedrosa was the previous race winner in Japan, with Rossi finishing in second and Lorenzo in third. In the teams championship, Movistar Yamaha conserved its lead in Japan to 192 points over Repsol Honda, making it also mathematically impossible for the team to be beaten, while the Ducati Factory Team sat in third place only 34 points away from Repsol Honda and still had an opportunity to take second place by the end of the season. The constructors championship showed Yamaha had a 57-point lead over Honda, although there was still a possibility for Honda to win the title, it was highly unlikely.

Due to injuries sustained at the Catalan Grand Prix earlier in the season, Karel Abraham announced that he would step aside from the rest of the season beginning with the Japanese Grand Prix, with Anthony West taking his place in Australia, Malaysia and Valencia. Alex de Angelis also announced that he would not compete the rest of the season after sustaining an injury during a free practice session in Japan, with Damian Cudlin replacing him for the Australian and Malaysian races.

=== Practice and Qualifying ===
Despite warm and sunny conditions on Thursday, the weather on Friday turned to cold and rainy by Friday with an average temperature of 14 °C throughout the day.

In the first practice session, after being cut short due to rain hitting the circuit, Jorge Lorenzo, Marc Marquez, Valentino Rossi and Dani Pedrosa covered the top four spots, with Jack Miller completing the top five. Most of the session took place in overcast conditions, with belief that the weather would improve throughout the weekend.

The third practice session began early Saturday morning, a cross wind had developed across pit straight, which compromised riding times. Iannone took the lead within the first 10 minutes of the session, while Rossi became the first to improve on his Friday practice times. With 10 minutes to go, Marquez was the only rider able to pass the time set by Iannone with the track temperature increasing to 22 °C and the sun beginning to make an impact, producing more tyre grip than yesterdays practices as riders changed to slick tyres. Despite nearly riding into the back of Pol Espargaró in turn four, Marquez set the quickest time of the weekend a lap later, with Cal Crutchlow finishing in second place and Lorenzo in third, Scott Redding set his fastest lap of the weekend finishing in fourth while Maverick Viñales completed the top five.

Marquez continued his pace, again finishing first during fourth practice, finishing 0.619 seconds ahead of Lorenzo, with Andrea Iannone in third.

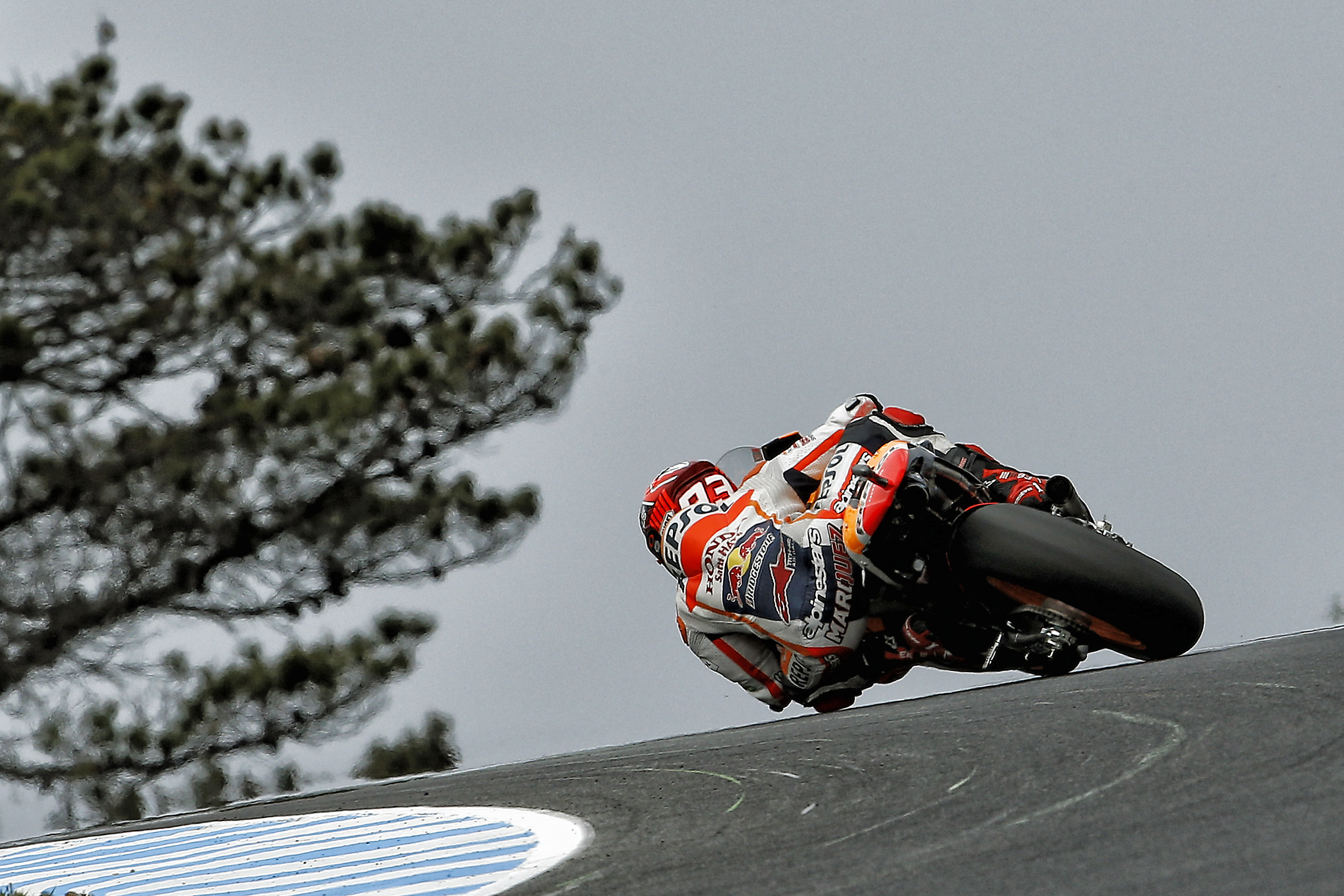
Marc Márquez in Friday practice

Pol Espargaro began Q1 by recording one of the fastest times of the weekend amongst the non-factory bikes, he set an even quicker lap time on his second attempt which secured his spot in Q2, while the battle for the second spot intensified as three riders including Aleix Espargaro, Danilo Petrucci and Miller exchanged second place in quick succession, with Aleix taking the second spot on his Suzuki despite being held up by the Aprilia riders Stefan Bradl and Álvaro Bautista.

In what was described as “perfect track conditions”, Marquez won his eighth pole position for the season, leading throughout the entirety of the qualifying session, setting the fastest time of the weekend on his first attempt. Aleix Espargaro came close to equalling Marquez's first qualifying record target, losing time in the final sector staying in second place at the halfway point of the session, while Lorenzo remained in third place after one attempt with Iannone in fourth. Marquez made a strategic decision to complete three runs within the session and had the entire track to himself in his second run, allowing him to improve his time drastically. During the last three minutes, everyone began improving their sector times, with no one being able to catch Marquez at the top. In an unprecedented and rare moment for the sport, Iannone and Lorenzo tied for second place, with both men setting the exact same top qualifying time, Iannone declared the winner of the tiebreaker from his second fastest qualifying time, while Lorenzo only set one lap. Despite qualifying in second, Iannone's tactics came underfire as he consistently tagged Lorenzo and followed him around the track lap after lap, a tactic that angered Lorenzo, Yamaha and journalists covering the event. Iannone acknowledged that tagging Lorenzo helped his time, but stopped short of calling it cheating, stating he felt he could still achieve the same time without him, while Lorenzo and journalists disagreed with Iannone's statement. Pedrosa qualified in fourth, despite being in the front row position throughout the session. Crutchlow was crowned the top independent rider for the session, placing fifth and Vinales finishing sixth. Championship leader, Rossi performed his worst qualifying session since Indianapolis, finishing in seventh place and on the third row. Aleix and Pol Espargaro qualified eighth and ninth respectively. After sweeping the weekend in practice and qualifying, fans and journalists began predicting how big a margin Marquez would win by and whether any other rider had a chance of victory, not anticipating the incredible race that would unexpectedly unfold the next day.

=== Race ===
The race began at 4pm local time, with Iannone lead the field going into turn one, although the lead didn't last long as Lorenzo took over the lead by turn eight. The beginning of the second lap, Iannone had retaken the lead but was bizarrely hit by a seagull flying on the track causing body damage to his bike, he briefly lapsed in concentration allowing Lorenzo to retake the lead and Marquez to join them the leading battle pack. The battle began to heat up between the top three riders with obvious advantages and disadvantages between the Honda, Yamaha and Ducati. Iannone's Ducati had incredible straight line speed which allowed him to pass his competitors on the main straight with ease, while despite having the weakest straight line speed Lorenzo's Yamaha had the best corner speed of the three riders and Marquez's Honda being the most consistent in both the corners and the straight line speed. The constant passing between the top three riders allowed Rossi and Crutchlow to catch up to the leading battle pack, although Crutchlow - whose LCR Honda was suffering from wheel spin - was not able to keep the same pace as the top four and began to drop away from the leaders. When Rossi joined the leading battle pack, Lorenzo began to establish a dominant lead leaving Marquez, Iannone and Rossi in a three-way battle for second place.

Lap 25, Lorenzo still had an established lead with Marquez, Rossi and Iannone still chasing when Rossi attempted to pass Marquez, the manoeuvre left open space for Iannone to pass both riders moving him from fourth to second, which was praised as one of the best overtakes of the season. As the final lap began, Lorenzo was running first, Iannone in second, Marquez third and Rossi fourth. Incredibly, Marquez completed his fastest lap of the race, managing to overtake Iannone, as well as Lorenzo halfway through the lap to win. While Lorenzo was devastated, Iannone managed to pass Rossi on the final corner to take third place, shrinking Lorenzo's championship deficit to eleven points to his visible delight.

Tammy Gorali, the MotoGP commentator for Sport 5 Israel, counted 52 passes between the top four riders including 13 lead changes throughout the race with Iannone completing the most, with 18 overtakes.

=== Post Race ===
The race has been applauded by fans, journalists and riders for its unpredictable nature and thrilling racing between race winner Marquez, eventual world champion Lorenzo, Iannone and Rossi, journalists calling it "the race we had been waiting for" and one of the best since the beginning of the 4-stroke era. Marquez expressed surprise when he passed Lorenzo on the final lap and didn't believe he could catch him as the front tyre of his bike began overheating towards the end of the race, also calling his race win one of the best in his career. Lorenzo also admitted he was surprised when Marquez passed him, but praised him for his "unbelievable last lap". He also praised the race calling it "the best this year and probably in the last five or 10 years." Commentator Matt Birt, compared the finish between Marquez and Lorenzo to the finish of Lorenzo and Rossi at the 2009 Catalunya Grand Prix, describing the race as "breathless and fearless". Iannone's incident with the seagull went viral on social media websites hours after the race, with memes and Facebook pages dedicated to the event. Iannone saw the humorous side of the situation commenting at the press conference, "The seagull waited for the kiss". Despite the seagull mishap, Iannone's performance is described as the best race of his MotoGP career. The event trended worldwide on social media website Twitter, with celebrities such as Mark Webber, Pau Gasol and Ewan McGregor praising the race as one of the best.

Rossi did not share the same positive views of the race as his fellow riders accusing Marquez and Lorenzo of conspiring against him to ensure that Lorenzo won this year's world title at his expense, a claim Marquez and Lorenzo both strongly denied. He also accused Marquez of sandbagging the race to ensure that Lorenzo gained an unassailable lead to ensure he has a stronger chance of being able to catch up to Rossi's then eighteen point lead. Marquez took offence to these comments which lead to their famous incident in Malaysia which resulted in Rossi receiving a last place grid penalty for Valencia, losing the world title to Lorenzo as a result. Rossi has since admitted regret in making the comments but has never apologised.

== Classification ==
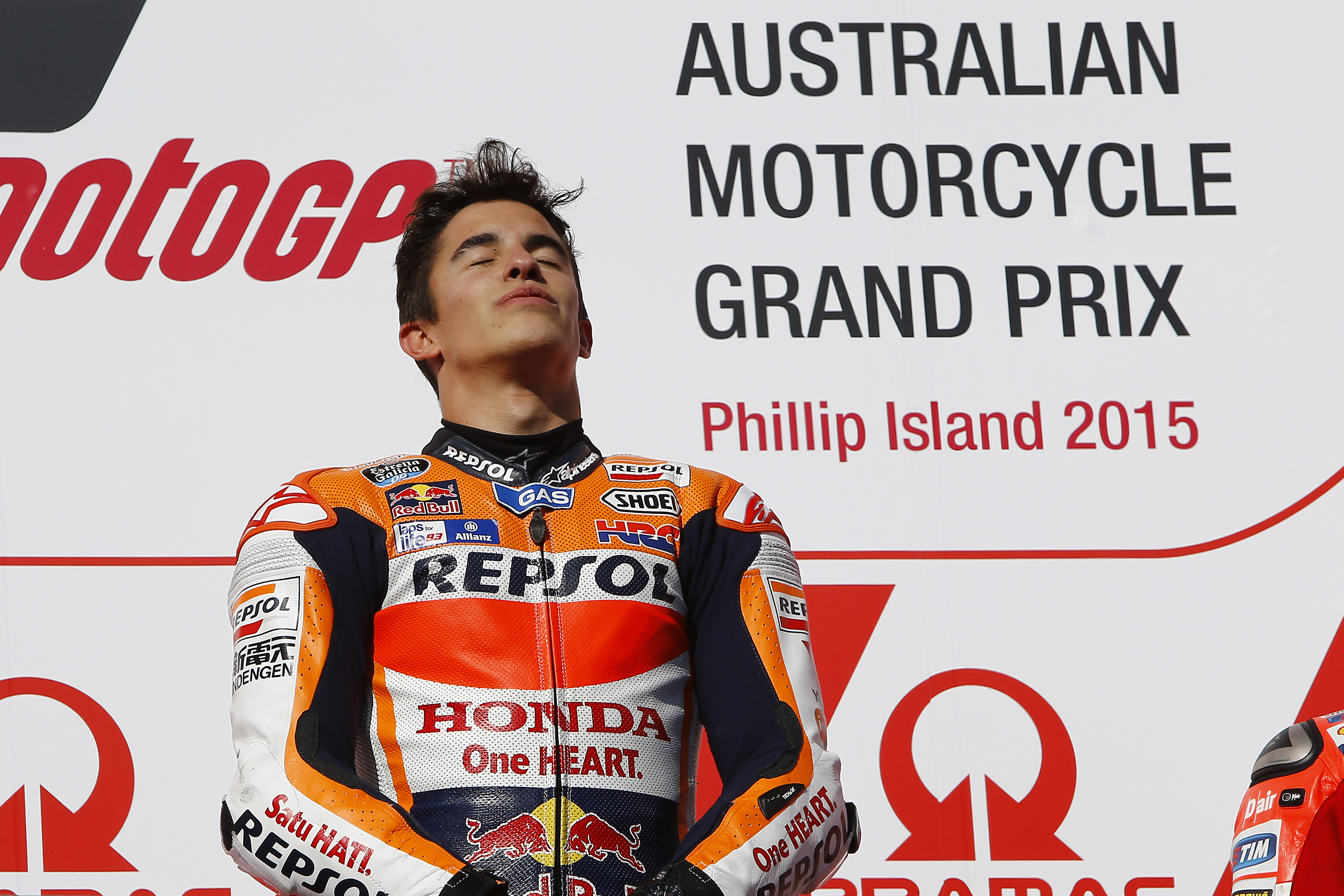
Marc Márquez, celebrating on the podium after winning the MotoGP race.

=== MotoGP ===
Pos.	No.	Rider	Team	Manufacturer	Laps	Time/Retired	Grid	Points
1	93	(Spain) Marc Márquez	Repsol Honda Team	Honda	27	40:33.849	1	25
2	99	(Spain) Jorge Lorenzo	Movistar Yamaha MotoGP	Yamaha	27	+0.249	3	20
3	29	(Italy) Andrea Iannone	Ducati Team	Ducati	27	+0.930	2	16
4	46	(Italy) Valentino Rossi	Movistar Yamaha MotoGP	Yamaha	27	+1.058	7	13
5	26	(Spain) Dani Pedrosa	Repsol Honda Team	Honda	27	+5.062	4	11
6	25	(Spain) Maverick Viñales	Team Suzuki Ecstar	Suzuki	27	+6.800	6	10
7	35	(United Kingdom) Cal Crutchlow	LCR Honda	Honda	27	+9.375	5	9
8	44	(Spain) Pol Espargaró	Monster Yamaha Tech 3	Yamaha	27	+18.401	9	8
9	41	(Spain) Aleix Espargaró	Team Suzuki Ecstar	Suzuki	27	+20.039	8	7
10	38	(United Kingdom) Bradley Smith	Monster Yamaha Tech 3	Yamaha	27	+20.657	12	6
11	45	(United Kingdom) Scott Redding	EG 0,0 Marc VDS	Honda	27	+21.846	11	5
12	9	(Italy) Danilo Petrucci	Octo Pramac Racing	Ducati	27	+22.840	13	4
13	4	(Italy) Andrea Dovizioso	Ducati Team	Ducati	27	+29.168	10	3
14	19	(Spain) Álvaro Bautista	Aprilia Racing Team Gresini	Aprilia	27	+37.244	18	2
15	43	(Australia) Jack Miller	LCR Honda	Honda	27	+40.192	15	1
16	8	(Spain) Héctor Barberá	Avintia Racing	Ducati	27	+48.263	14	
17	68	(Colombia) Yonny Hernández	Octo Pramac Racing	Ducati	27	+48.572	17	
18	76	(France) Loris Baz	Forward Racing	Yamaha Forward	27	+48.677	19	
19	50	(Republic of Ireland) Eugene Laverty	Aspar MotoGP Team	Honda	27	+50.201	16	
20	63	(France) Mike Di Meglio	Avintia Racing	Ducati	27	+50.262	22	
21	6	(Germany) Stefan Bradl	Aprilia Racing Team Gresini	Aprilia	27	+50.277	21	
22	24	(Spain) Toni Elías	Forward Racing	Yamaha Forward	27	+1:20.942	24	
23	13	(Australia) Anthony West	AB Motoracing	Honda	27	+1:23.454	23	
Ret	69	(United States) Nicky Hayden	Aspar MotoGP Team	Honda	9	Mechanical	20	
Ret	55	(Australia) Damian Cudlin	E-Motion IodaRacing Team	ART	9	Retirement	25	

=== Moto2 ===
Pos.	No.	Rider	Manufacturer	Laps	Time/Retired	Grid	Points
1	40	(Spain) Álex Rins	Kalex	25	39:00.084	1	25
2	22	(United Kingdom) Sam Lowes	Speed Up	25	+6.633	3	20
3	7	(Italy) Lorenzo Baldassarri	Kalex	25	+10.408	9	16
4	30	(Japan) Takaaki Nakagami	Kalex	25	+15.536	6	13
5	19	(Belgium) Xavier Siméon	Kalex	25	+16.205	17	11
6	39	(Spain) Luis Salom	Kalex	25	+17.241	16	10
7	5	(France) Johann Zarco	Kalex	25	+20.456	7	9
8	36	(Finland) Mika Kallio	Speed Up	25	+21.883	5	8
9	73	(Spain) Álex Márquez	Kalex	25	+24.473	18	7
10	4	(Switzerland) Randy Krummenacher	Kalex	25	+24.559	21	6
11	21	(Italy) Franco Morbidelli	Kalex	25	+35.103	19	5
12	23	(Germany) Marcel Schrötter	Tech 3	25	+36.583	20	4
13	3	(Italy) Simone Corsi	Kalex	25	+36.588	12	3
14	88	(Spain) Ricard Cardús	Suter	25	+36.642	11	2
15	12	(Switzerland) Thomas Lüthi	Kalex	25	+38.115	4	1
16	55	(Malaysia) Hafizh Syahrin	Kalex	25	+47.215	13	
17	2	(Switzerland) Jesko Raffin	Kalex	25	+47.254	23	
18	60	(Spain) Julián Simón	Speed Up	25	+47.305	10	
19	97	(Spain) Xavi Vierge	Tech 3	25	+47.382	25	
20	16	(Australia) Joshua Hook	Kalex	25	+47.963	24	
21	25	(Malaysia) Azlan Shah	Kalex	25	+55.273	15	
22	57	(Spain) Edgar Pons	Kalex	25	+58.441	26	
23	96	(France) Louis Rossi	Tech 3	25	+59.229	22	
24	49	(Spain) Axel Pons	Kalex	25	+1:00.321	2	
25	10	(Thailand) Thitipong Warokorn	Kalex	25	+1:26.478	27	
Ret	94	(Germany) Jonas Folger	Kalex	21	Flat Tire	14	
Ret	11	(Germany) Sandro Cortese	Kalex	14	Accident	8	
Ret	66	(Germany) Florian Alt	Suter	10	Knee Pain	28	
Ret	70	(Switzerland) Robin Mulhauser	Kalex	9	Accident	29	
DNS	1	(Spain) Tito Rabat	Kalex		Did not start		
OFFICIAL MOTO2 REPORT

=== Moto3 ===
Pos.	No.	Rider	Manufacturer	Laps	Time/Retired	Grid	Points
1	44	(Portugal) Miguel Oliveira	KTM	23	37:34.742	2	25
2	7	(Spain) Efrén Vázquez	Honda	23	+0.132	3	20
3	41	(South Africa) Brad Binder	KTM	23	+0.161	9	16
4	9	(Spain) Jorge Navarro	Honda	23	+0.170	4	13
5	84	(Czech Republic) Jakub Kornfeil	KTM	23	+0.288	8	11
6	5	(Italy) Romano Fenati	KTM	23	+1.006	5	10
7	65	(Germany) Philipp Öttl	KTM	23	+6.200	23	9
8	32	(Spain) Isaac Viñales	KTM	23	+6.253	10	8
9	10	(France) Alexis Masbou	Honda	23	+6.322	17	7
10	2	(Australia) Remy Gardner	Mahindra	23	+7.567	28	6
11	6	(Spain) María Herrera	Husqvarna	23	+7.573	11	5
12	63	(Malaysia) Zulfahmi Khairuddin	KTM	23	+10.088	13	4
13	96	(Italy) Manuel Pagliani	Mahindra	23	+16.294	32	3
14	98	(Czech Republic) Karel Hanika	KTM	23	+17.792	12	2
15	88	(Spain) Jorge Martín	Mahindra	23	+17.814	19	1
16	19	(Italy) Alessandro Tonucci	Mahindra	23	+18.205	22	
17	23	(Italy) Niccolò Antonelli	Honda	23	+37.921	15	
18	22	(Spain) Ana Carrasco	KTM	23	+42.463	31	
19	35	(Australia) Olly Simpson	KTM	23	+1:24.024	33	
Ret	48	(Italy) Lorenzo Dalla Porta	Husqvarna	15	Accident Damage	21	
Ret	52	(United Kingdom) Danny Kent	Honda	13	Accident	7	
Ret	33	(Italy) Enea Bastianini	Honda	13	Accident	25	
Ret	55	(Italy) Andrea Locatelli	Honda	13	Neck Pain	34	
Ret	14	(Australia) Matt Barton	FTR	13	Retirement	35	
Ret	21	(Italy) Francesco Bagnaia	Mahindra	9	Accident	26	
Ret	95	(France) Jules Danilo	Honda	8	Retirement	20	
Ret	17	(United Kingdom) John McPhee	Honda	6	Accident	1	
Ret	36	(Spain) Joan Mir	Honda	6	Accident	18	
Ret	58	(Spain) Juan Francisco Guevara	Mahindra	6	Accident	16	
Ret	16	(Italy) Andrea Migno	KTM	6	Accident	29	
Ret	11	(Belgium) Livio Loi	Honda	4	Accident	6	
Ret	29	(Italy) Stefano Manzi	Mahindra	0	Accident	14	
Ret	91	(Argentina) Gabriel Rodrigo	KTM	0	Accident	24	
Ret	40	(South Africa) Darryn Binder	Mahindra	0	Accident	27	
Ret	24	(Japan) Tatsuki Suzuki	Mahindra	0	Accident	30	
DNS	20	(France) Fabio Quartararo	Honda		Did not start		
OFFICIAL MOTO3 REPORT

== Championship standings after the race (MotoGP) ==
Below are the standings for the top five riders and constructors after round sixteen has concluded.

Riders' Championship standings

Pos.	Rider	Points
1	(Italy) Valentino Rossi	296
2	(Spain) Jorge Lorenzo	285
3	(Spain) Marc Márquez	222
4	(Italy) Andrea Iannone	188
5	(Spain) Dani Pedrosa	165

Constructors' Championship standings

Pos.	Constructor	Points
1	(Japan) Yamaha	362
2	(Japan) Honda	310
3	(Italy) Ducati	237
4	(Japan) Suzuki	120
5	(Switzerland) Yamaha Forward	33

Teams' Championship standings

Pos.	Team	Points
1	(Japan) Movistar Yamaha MotoGP	581
2	(Japan) Repsol Honda Team	392
3	(Italy) Ducati Team	341
4	(France) Monster Yamaha Tech 3	254
5	(Japan) Team Suzuki Ecstar	172

- Note: Only the top five positions are included for all sets of standings.

== Notes ==
Previous race: 2015 Japanese Grand Prix	FIM Grand Prix World Championship; 2015 season	Next race: 2015 Malaysian Grand Prix
Previous race: 2014 Australian Grand Prix	Australian motorcycle Grand Prix	Next race: 2016 Australian Grand Prix
