= 2013 Red Bull MotoGP Rookies Cup =

Motorcycle racing competition

2013 Red Bull MotoGP Rookies Cup season

Seasons
- ← 2012 2014 →

The 2013 Red Bull MotoGP Rookies Cup season was the seventh season of the Red Bull MotoGP Rookies Cup. The season began at Circuit of the Americas on 20 April and ended on 29 September at the Ciudad del Motor de Aragón after 14 races. The races, for the first year contested by the riders on equal KTM 250cc 4-stroke Moto3 bikes, were held at eight meetings on the Grand Prix motorcycle racing calendar.

Czech rider Karel Hanika won the championship, securing the title after the Misano race.

== Calendar ==
2013 calendar
Round	Date	Circuit	Pole position	Fastest lap	Race winner	Sources
1	20 April	(United States) Austin	(Czech Republic) Karel Hanika	(United Kingdom) Bradley Ray	(United Kingdom) Bradley Ray	
1	21 April	(United States) Austin	(Czech Republic) Karel Hanika	(Italy) Manuel Pagliani	(Czech Republic) Karel Hanika	
2	4 May	(Spain) Jerez	(Czech Republic) Karel Hanika	(Czech Republic) Karel Hanika	(Spain) Jorge Martín	
2	5 May	(Spain) Jerez	(Czech Republic) Karel Hanika	(Italy) Stefano Manzi	(Italy) Enea Bastianini	
3	28 June	(Netherlands) Assen	(Czech Republic) Karel Hanika	(Italy) Stefano Manzi	(Czech Republic) Karel Hanika	
3	29 June	(Netherlands) Assen	(Czech Republic) Karel Hanika	(Spain) Jorge Martín	(Czech Republic) Karel Hanika	
4	13 July	(Germany) Sachsenring	(Spain) Jorge Martín	(Turkey) Toprak Razgatlıoğlu	(Spain) Jorge Martín	
4	14 July	(Germany) Sachsenring	(Spain) Jorge Martín	(Czech Republic) Karel Hanika	(Czech Republic) Karel Hanika	
5	24 August	(Czech Republic) Brno	(Czech Republic) Karel Hanika	(United States) Joe Roberts	(Czech Republic) Karel Hanika	
6	31 August	(United Kingdom) Silverstone	(Czech Republic) Karel Hanika	(United States) Joe Roberts	(Czech Republic) Karel Hanika	
6	1 September	(United Kingdom) Silverstone	(Czech Republic) Karel Hanika	(Spain) Joan Mir	(Netherlands) Scott Deroue	
7	14 September	(San Marino) Misano	(Italy) Enea Bastianini	(Spain) Marcos Ramírez	(Italy) Manuel Pagliani	
8	28 September	Aragon	(Czech Republic) Karel Hanika	(Spain) Joan Mir	(Czech Republic) Karel Hanika	
8	29 September	Aragon	(Czech Republic) Karel Hanika	(Spain) Jorge Martín	(Italy) Enea Bastianini	

== Entry list ==
2013 entry list
No.	Rider	Rounds
3	(Spain) Diego Pérez	All
6	(France) Corentin Perolari	All
7	(Germany) Aris Michail	All
10	(Finland) Felix Nässi	All
18	(Italy) Mario Tocca	All
19	(United Kingdom) Tarran Mackenzie	All
24	(Spain) Marcos Ramírez	All
27	(United States) Joe Roberts	All
28	(United Kingdom) Bradley Ray	All
29	(Italy) Stefano Manzi	All
33	(Italy) Enea Bastianini	All
34	(South Africa) Jordan Weaving	All
36	(Spain) Joan Mir	All
40	(South Africa) Darryn Binder	All
45	(Australia) Olly Simpson	1–4, 8
46	(Japan) Yui Watanabe	1, 3–8
50	(Austria) Lukas Trautmann	1–2, 4–8
54	(Turkey) Toprak Razgatlıoğlu	All
64	(United States) Anthony Alonso	All
74	(Japan) Soushi Mihara	All
88	(Spain) Jorge Martín	All
95	(Netherlands) Scott Deroue	All
96	(Italy) Manuel Pagliani	All
98	(Czech Republic) Karel Hanika	All

== Championship standings ==
Points were awarded to the top fifteen finishers. Rider had to finish the race to earn points.

Position	1st	2nd	3rd	4th	5th	6th	7th	8th	9th	10th	11th	12th	13th	14th	15th
Points	25	20	16	13	11	10	9	8	7	6	5	4	3	2	1

Pos.	Rider	AME (United States)		JER (Spain)		ASS (Netherlands)		SAC (Germany)		BRN (Czech Republic)	SIL (United Kingdom)		MIS (San Marino)	ARA (Aragon)		Pts
1	(Czech Republic) Karel Hanika	**2**	**1**	**2**	**2**	**1**	**1**	Ret	1	**1**	**1**	**Ret**	Ret	**1**	**Ret**	235
2	(Spain) Jorge Martín	7	6	1	4	2	3	**1**	**Ret**	3	Ret	12	9	7	7	163
3	(Italy) Stefano Manzi	Ret	12	5	3	Ret	2	2	3	Ret	16	5	2	3	2	154
4	(Italy) Enea Bastianini	15	9	3	1	8	8	7	7	Ret	4	9	**4**	9	1	148
5	(Spain) Marcos Ramírez	8	13	12	8	3	6	9	8	7	3	3	3	8	3	145
6	(Italy) Manuel Pagliani	4	2	Ret	Ret	17	12	4	2	2	7	4	1	Ret	Ret	137
7	(Netherlands) Scott Deroue	6	7	9	7	Ret	4	3	Ret	6	Ret	1	8	2	Ret	127
8	(Spain) Diego Pérez	5	14	4	13	6	5	5	Ret	8	2	7	11	11	5	119
9	(Spain) Joan Mir	9	18	17	12	10	11	11	4	13	5	2	6	4	6	107
10	(Turkey) Toprak Razgatlıoğlu	3	3	6	5	Ret	15	6	12	19	Ret	8	12	10	4	99
11	(United Kingdom) Bradley Ray	1	4	8	6	Ret	Ret	10	13	9	Ret	11	Ret	6	8	95
12	(Japan) Soushi Mihara	12	16	13	9	11	16	8	6	5	6	6	10	12	10	84
13	(South Africa) Jordan Weaving	20	21	11	15	4	7	12	9	10	8	10	Ret	13	14	64
14	(United States) Joe Roberts	NC	Ret	7	10	5	9	Ret	11	4	Ret	Ret	7	Ret	Ret	60
15	(South Africa) Darryn Binder	17	5	10	Ret	16	Ret	14	Ret	12	Ret	16	5	5	Ret	45
16	(Australia) Olly Simpson	16	19	Ret	DNS	7	10	Ret	5					Ret	11	31
17	(France) Corentin Perolari	10	8	Ret	DNS	12	Ret	Ret	14	14	Ret	Ret	Ret	14	12	28
18	(Germany) Aris Michail	11	17	16	14	9	13	13	Ret	Ret	11	14	16	17	Ret	27
19	(Austria) Lukas Trautmann	18	10	Ret	DNS			18	10	Ret	10	13	14	15	13	27
20	(United Kingdom) Tarran Mackenzie	Ret	11	Ret	Ret	14	19	15	15	15	9	17	19	16	9	24
21	(Japan) Yui Watanabe	13	DNS			13	17	Ret	Ret	11	12	15	15	18	17	17
22	(Italy) Mario Tocca	21	22	14	11	15	20	19	Ret	17	14	19	18	20	15	11
23	(United States) Anthony Alonso	14	15	15	Ret	18	14	16	16	16	15	18	13	19	Ret	10
24	(Finland) Felix Nässi	19	20	Ret	16	19	18	17	17	18	13	Ret	17	21	16	3
Pos.	Rider	AME (United States)		JER (Spain)		ASS (Netherlands)		SAC (Germany)		BRN (Czech Republic)	SIL (United Kingdom)		MIS (San Marino)	ARA (Aragon)		Pts

Colour	Result
Gold	Winner
Silver	Second place
Bronze	Third place
Green	Points classification
Blue	Non-points classification
Blue	Non-classified finish (NC)
Purple	Retired, not classified (Ret)
Red	Did not qualify (DNQ)
Red	Did not pre-qualify (DNPQ)
Black	Disqualified (DSQ)
White	Did not start (DNS)
White	Withdrew (WD)
White	Race cancelled (C)
Blank	Did not practice (DNP)
Blank	Did not arrive (DNA)
Blank	Excluded (EX)

**Bold** – Pole position
Italics – Fastest lap
