= Stefano Manzi =

Italian motorcycle racer (born 1999)

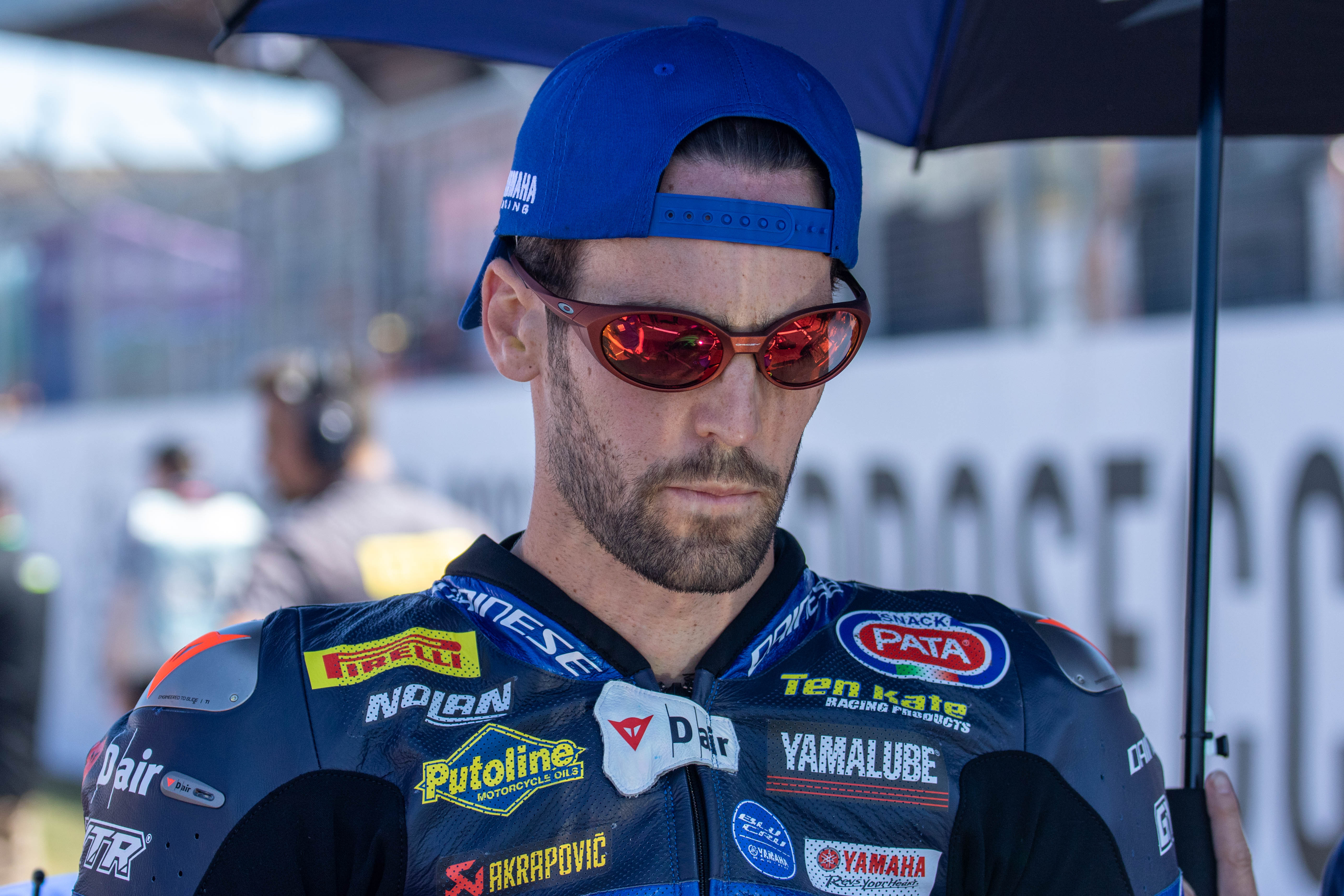
- Manzi at Donington World Supersport, 2025
- Nationality: Italian
- Born: 29 March 1999 (age 27); Rimini, Italy
- Current team: GYTR GRT Yamaha WorldSBK Team
- Bike number: 62
Motorcycle racing career statistics
Moto2 World Championship
Active years	2017–2022, 2024
Manufacturers	Kalex, Suter, MV Agusta
Championships	0
2024 championship position	37th (0 pts)
Starts / Wins / Podiums / Poles / F. laps / Points; 88 / 0 / 0 / 1 / 0 / 127
Moto3 World Championship
Active years	2015–2016
Manufacturers	Mahindra
Championships	0
2016 championship position	29th (13 pts)
Starts / Wins / Podiums / Poles / F. laps / Points; 20 / 0 / 0 / 0 / 0 / 23
Superbike World Championship
Active years	2026–
Manufacturers	Yamaha
Starts / Wins / Podiums / Poles / F. laps / Points; 3 / 0 / 0 / 0 / 0 / 2
Supersport World Championship
Active years	2021-2025
Manufacturers	Triumph, Yamaha
Championships	1 (2025)
2025 championship position	1st (466 pts)
Starts / Wins / Podiums / Poles / F. laps / Points; 97 / 21 / 61 / 3 / 9 / 1505

Stefano Manzi (born 29 March 1999 in Rimini) is an Italian motorcycle racer. He won the Supersport World Championship in 2025 with the Ten Kate Racing. In 2026, he is set to compete in World Superbike with GYTR GRT Yamaha WorldSBK Team.

== Career ==
=== Junior career ===
Manzi joined the 2012 Red Bull MotoGP Rookies Cup, and had two podiums in his first season already, a second place at the Sachsenring and a third place at Brno. He ended his rookie campaign with 75 points and 13th in the standings. He returned for both 2013 and 2014, finishing 2013 third in the competition with four second places, and three third places, and again finished third in 2014, with one victory, two second places, and six third places.

=== Moto3 World Championship ===
==== San Carlo Team Italia (2015) ====
Manzi made his debut in the 2015 Moto3 World Championship, racing from the second round of the season onwards, after being replaced for the opening event by Marco Bezzecchi due to age limits. Riding on a Mahindra MGP3O entered by San Carlo Team Italia, alongside his compatriot Matteo Ferrari, he finished in the points four times, his best result being a twelfth place in Aragon. He ended his rookie year 27th in the standings with ten points.

==== Mahindra Racing (2016) ====
In the 2016 season, Manzi appeared in three races as a wild card, scoring a 20th place in Austria, a fourth place at Silverstone, and a 16th place in Rimini. He ended the season 29th in the standings, with 13 points, all 13 coming in Silverstone.

=== Moto2 World Championship ===
==== Sky Racing Team VR46 (2017) ====
In 2017, Manzi moved up to the Moto2 class with Sky Racing Team VR46 alongside fellow Italian Francesco Bagnaia, riding a Kalex. Manzi finished in the points four times, his best result a seventh place at Silverstone, overall finishing the year with 14 points, 25th in the standings.

==== Forward Racing Team (2018) ====
For 2018, Manzi switched to Forward Racing, swapping places with Luca Marini who went to Sky Racing Team VR46. Manzi had a bad year, finishing in the points only twice out of 15 races (a tenth place in France, and a 14th place in Austria), before being involved in a nasty crash during the race in Misano, where Romano Fenati reached over, and pulled Manzi's brakes at 200 km/h. Manzi managed to stay on the bike, but later crashed out on his own, while Fenati was black-flagged and disqualified from the race. Although after the race Fenati was given a two race ban, his contract was terminated with immediate effect by the Rivacold Snipers team, and Manzi raced the following two weekends since he wasn't injured in the accident; when Fenati came back following his two race ban, Manzi sat out the remainder of the season, stating that "I don't feel safe with riders on the track trying to kill me." Manzi finished the year with eight points, 24th in the championship.

==== MV Agusta Forward Racing (2019–2020) ====
Manzi stayed with Forward Racing for the 2019 season, but was now riding MV Agusta bikes. He had a better season than 2018, finishing in the points seven times, four times in the top-ten, including a seventh place in Assen, and a fourth place in the season closer round at Valencia. Manzi ended the season 19th in the rider's championship, with 39 points.

In his final year with Forward Racing, the 2020 season saw Manzi grab his first pole position in the category, at the penultimate round in Valencia, marking the first pole position of Forward Racing since 2010, and the first pole position of MV Agusta in 44 years. He retired from the race, ending his season with eight point scoring finishes, a best result of ninth in Jerez, and 22nd overall in the championship with 21 points.

==== Flexbox HP40 (2021) ====
Riding for Pons Racing in 2021, alongside Héctor Garzó, Manzi had another average year, with seven point scoring finishes, three top-ten finishes in Doha (eighth), Mugello (tenth), and Misano (sixth), ending his last season of Moto2 with 36 points, 19th in the standings.

==== Yamaha VR46 Master Camp Team (2022) ====
Manzi replaced Keminth Kubo for this team.

=== Supersport World Championship ===
==== Dynavolt Triumph (2022) ====
Manzi competed in the 2022 Supersport World Championship, with the Dynavolt Triumph.

== Career statistics ==
=== Red Bull MotoGP Rookies Cup ===
==== Races by year ====
(key) (Races in bold indicate pole position, races in italics indicate fastest lap)

Year	1	2	3	4	5	6	7	8	9	10	11	12	13	14	15	Pos	Pts
2012	SPA1; 15	SPA2; 17	POR1; 19	POR2; 12	GBR1; Ret	GBR2; Ret	NED1; 9	NED2; 14	GER1; 9	GER2; 2	CZE1; 22	CZE2; 3	RSM; Ret	ARA1; 6	ARA2; 8	13th	75
2013	AME1; Ret	AME2; 12	JER1; 5	JER2; 3	ASS1; Ret	ASS2; 2	SAC1; 2	SAC2; 3	BRN; Ret	SIL1; 16	SIL2; 5	MIS; 2	ARA1; 3	ARA2; 2		3rd	154
2014	JER1; 5	JER1; 4	MUG; 3	ASS1; Ret	ASS2; 3	SAC1; 3	SAC2; Ret	BRN1; 3	BRN2; 3	SIL1; 3	SIL2; 2	MIS; 1	ARA1; 2	ARA2; 8		3rd	193

=== FIM CEV Moto3 Junior World Championship ===
==== Races by year ====
(key) (Races in bold indicate pole position, races in italics indicate fastest lap)

Year	Bike	1	2	3	4	5	6	7	8	9	10	11	12	Pos	Pts
2014	Mahindra	JER1; 20	JER2; 10	LMS; 12	ARA; 10	CAT1; 8	CAT2; 12	ALB; 4	NAV; Ret	ALG; Ret	VAL1	VAL2		12th	41
2016	Mahindra	VAL1; 7	VAL2; Ret	LMS; 3	ARA; Ret	CAT1; 8	CAT2; 10	ALB; 6	ALG; Ret	JER1; 7	JER2; 11	VAL1	VAL2	12th	63

=== Grand Prix motorcycle racing ===
==== By season ====
Season	Class	Motorcycle	Team	Race	Win	Podium	Pole	FLap	Pts	Plcd
2015	Moto3	Mahindra	San Carlo Team Italia	17	0	0	0	0	10	27th
2016	Moto3	Mahindra	Mahindra Racing	3	0	0	0	0	13	29th
2017	Moto2	Kalex	Sky Racing Team VR46	18	0	0	0	0	14	25th
2018	Moto2	Suter	Forward Racing Team	15	0	0	0	0	8	24th
2019	Moto2	MV Agusta	MV Agusta Forward Racing	18	0	0	0	0	39	19th
2020	Moto2	MV Agusta	MV Agusta Forward Racing	15	0	0	1	0	21	22nd
2021	Moto2	Kalex	Flexbox HP40	18	0	0	0	0	36	19th
2022	Moto2	Kalex	Yamaha VR46 Master Camp Team	3	0	0	0	0	9	23rd
2024	Moto2	Kalex	Yamaha VR46 Master Camp Team	1	0	0	0	0	0	37th
Total				**108**	**0**	**0**	**1**	**0**	**150**	

==== By class ====
Class	Seasons	1st GP	1st pod	1st win	Race	Win	Podiums	Pole	FLap	Pts	WChmp
Moto3	2015–2016	2015 Americas			20	0	0	0	0	23	0
Moto2	2017–2022, 2024	2017 Qatar			88	0	0	1	0	127	0
Total	2015–2022, 2024				**108**	**0**	**0**	**1**	**0**	**150**	**0**

==== Races by year ====
(key) (Races in bold indicate pole position, races in italics indicate fastest lap)

Year	Class	Bike	1	2	3	4	5	6	7	8	9	10	11	12	13	14	15	16	17	18	19	20	Pos	Pts
2015	Moto3	Mahindra	QAT	AME; 24	ARG; 18	SPA; 19	FRA; 15	ITA; Ret	CAT; 27	NED; 22	GER; 22	INP; 19	CZE; 24	GBR; Ret	RSM; 14	ARA; 12	JPN; 18	AUS; Ret	MAL; 13	VAL; 19			27th	10
2016	Moto3	Mahindra	QAT	ARG	AME	SPA	FRA	ITA	CAT	NED	GER	AUT; 20	CZE	GBR; 4	RSM; 16	ARA	JPN	AUS	MAL	VAL			29th	13
2017	Moto2	Kalex	QAT; 29	ARG; 23	AME; Ret	SPA; 25	FRA; Ret	ITA; Ret	CAT; Ret	NED; 20	GER; 15	CZE; 21	AUT; Ret	GBR; 7	RSM; Ret	ARA; 15	JPN; 26	AUS; 13	MAL; Ret	VAL; Ret			25th	14
2018	Moto2	Suter	QAT; 26	ARG; 21	AME; Ret	SPA; Ret	FRA; 10	ITA; Ret	CAT; Ret	NED; Ret	GER; 25	CZE; Ret	AUT; 14	GBR; C	RSM; Ret	ARA; Ret	THA; Ret	JPN; 24	AUS; DNS	MAL	VAL		24th	8
2019	Moto2	MV Agusta	QAT; 20	ARG; Ret	AME	SPA; 21	FRA; 15	ITA; Ret	CAT; Ret	NED; 7	GER; 22	CZE; 20	AUT; 16	GBR; 17	RSM; 15	ARA; 14	THA; Ret	JPN; 10	AUS; 9	MAL; Ret	VAL; 4		19th	39
2020	Moto2	MV Agusta	QAT; 15	SPA; 11	ANC; 9	CZE; Ret	AUT; 17	STY; 14	RSM; 17	EMI; 15	CAT; Ret	FRA; 14	ARA; 14	TER; Ret	EUR; 15	**VAL**; Ret	POR; 19						22nd	21
2021	Moto2	Kalex	QAT; 19	DOH; 8	POR; Ret	SPA; 13	FRA; Ret	ITA; 10	CAT; 24	GER; 20	NED; 13	STY; 18	AUT; 24	GBR; Ret	ARA; 18	RSM; 16	AME; 19	EMI; 6	ALR; 13	VAL; 13			19th	36
2022	Moto2	Kalex	QAT	INA	ARG	AME	POR	SPA; 13	FRA; 10	ITA	CAT; 16	GER	NED	GBR	AUT	RSM	ARA	JPN	THA	AUS	MAL	VAL	23rd	9
2024	Moto2	Kalex	QAT	POR	AME	SPA	FRA	CAT	ITA	NED	GER	GBR	AUT	ARA	RSM	EMI	INA	JPN	AUS	THA	MAL	SLD; 21	37th	0

=== Supersport World Championship ===
==== Races by year ====
(key) (Races in bold indicate pole position; races in italics indicate fastest lap)

Year	Bike	1		2		3		4		5		6		7		8		9		10		11		12		Pos	Pts
Year	Bike	R1	R2	R1	R2	R1	R2	R1	R2	R1	R2	R1	R2	R1	R2	R1	R2	R1	R2	R1	R2	R1	R2	R1	R2	Pos	Pts
2021	Yamaha	SPA	SPA	POR	POR	ITA	ITA	NED	NED	CZE	CZE	SPA	SPA	FRA	FRA	SPA	SPA	SPA; C	SPA; 9	POR	POR	ARG	ARG	INA	INA	32nd	7
2022	Triumph	SPA; 7	SPA; 8	NED; Ret	NED; 6	POR; Ret	POR; Ret	ITA; 5	ITA; 4	GBR; 6	GBR; 5	CZE; 2	CZE; 3	FRA; 16	FRA; 7	SPA; Ret	SPA; 3	POR; 1	POR; Ret	ARG; 7	ARG; 5	INA; 7	INA; 2	AUS; 14	AUS; Ret	6th	209
2023	Yamaha	**AUS**; 6	**AUS**; 2	INA; 7	INA; 2	NED; 5	NED; 2	SPA; 6	SPA; 3	EMI; 2	EMI; 1	GBR; 2	GBR; 5	ITA; 1	ITA; 1	CZE; 2	CZE; Ret	FRA; 2	FRA; 3	SPA; 11	SPA; 2	POR; 2	POR; 1	JER; 2	JER; 2	2nd	408
2024	Yamaha	AUS; 2	AUS; Ret	SPA; 2	SPA; 1	**NED**; 2	NED; 21	EMI; 3	EMI; 4	GBR; 2	GBR; 4	CZE; 3	CZE; 2	POR; 3	POR; 2	FRA; Ret	FRA; 2	ITA; 2	ITA; 1	SPA; 2	SPA; 2	EST; 3	EST; 1	SPA; 1	SPA; 1	2nd	415
2025	Yamaha	AUS; 1	AUS; 2	POR; 2	POR; 2	NED; 2	NED; 2	ITA; 1	ITA; 1	CZE; 26	CZE; 6	EMI; 1	EMI; Ret	**GBR**; 1	GBR; 7	HUN; 1	HUN; 1	FRA; 1	FRA; 1	ARA; 3	ARA; 2	POR; 2	POR; 1	SPA; 1	SPA; 3	1st	466

=== Superbike World Championship ===
==== Races by season ====
Season	Motorcycle	Team	Race	Win	Podium	Pole	FLap	Pts	Plcd
2026	Yamaha YZF-R1	GYTR GRT Yamaha WorldSBK Team	3	0	0	0	0	2*	17th*
Total			**3**	**0**	**0**	**0**	**0**	**2**	

==== Races by year ====
(key) (Races in bold indicate pole position; races in italics indicate fastest lap)

Year	Bike	1			2			3			4			5			6			7			8			9			10			11			12			Pos	Pts
Year	Bike	R1	SR	R2	R1	SR	R2	R1	SR	R2	R1	SR	R2	R1	SR	R2	R1	SR	R2	R1	SR	R2	R1	SR	R2	R1	SR	R2	R1	SR	R2	R1	SR	R2	R1	SR	R2	Pos	Pts
2026	Yamaha	AUS; Ret	AUS; 13	AUS; 14	POR	POR	POR	NED	NED	NED	HUN	HUN	HUN	CZE	CZE	CZE	ARA	ARA	ARA	EMI	EMI	EMI	GBR	GBR	GBR	FRA	FRA	FRA	ITA	ITA	ITA	POR	POR	POR	SPA	SPA	SPA	17th*	2*

* Season still in progress.
