= Darryn Binder =

South African motorcycle racer

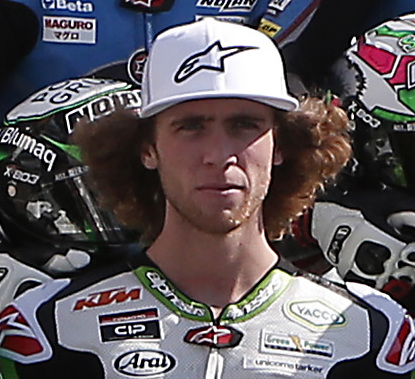
- Binder in 2019
- Nationality: South African
- Born: 21 January 1998 (age 28); Potchefstroom, South Africa
- Current team: Celtic/Economy Lube + Tire by Warhorse HSBK Ducati
- Bike number: 53
Motorcycle racing career statistics
MotoGP World Championship
Active years	2022
Manufacturers	Yamaha
Championships	0
2022 championship position	24th (12 pts)
Starts / Wins / Podiums / Poles / F. laps / Points; 20 / 0 / 0 / 0 / 0 / 12
Moto2 World Championship
Active years	2023–2025
Manufacturers	Kalex
2025 championship position	24th (19 points)
Starts / Wins / Podiums / Poles / F. laps / Points; 51 / 0 / 0 / 0 / 0 / 108
Moto3 World Championship
Active years	2015–2021
Manufacturers	Mahindra (2015–2016); KTM (2017–2020); Honda (2021)
Championships	0
2021 championship position	7th (136 pts)
Starts / Wins / Podiums / Poles / F. laps / Points; 117 / 1 / 6 / 3 / 6 / 431

Darryn Binder (born 21 January 1998) is a South African professional motorcycle racer currently competing in the MotoAmerica Supersport Championship for Celtic/Economy Lube + Tire by Warhorse HSBK Ducati. He is the 2026 AMA Supersport champion. Binder has previously raced in Moto3, Moto2, and even in MotoGP for a year, in the 2022 season.

== Career ==
Binder was born in Potchefstroom, South Africa. His older brother, Brad Binder, is also a professional motorcycle racer, and competed alongside Darryn in Moto3 in both 2015 and 2016.

In 2022, Binder moved up into MotoGP with WithU Yamaha RNF MotoGP Team, alongside Andrea Dovizioso.

Following the 2022 Australian motorcycle Grand Prix, Binder announced that he would race in the 2023 Moto2 World Championship for Liqui Moly Husqvarna Intact GP alongside Lukas Tulovic as Binder was unable to secure a seat in MotoGP for 2023.

Binder continued to race with Liqui Moly Husqvarna IntactGP in the 2024 Moto2 season, and with Gresini Racing in 2025. He had two weaker years and was not given a seat for the next season. Binder joined MotoAmerica's AMA Supersport Championship, where he won the title in his first season (2026).

== Career statistics ==
=== Red Bull MotoGP Rookies Cup ===
==== Races by year ====
(key) (Races in bold indicate pole position, races in italics indicate fastest lap)

Year	1	2	3	4	5	6	7	8	9	10	11	12	13	14	Pos	Pts
2013	AME1; 17	AME2; 5	JER1; 10	JER2; Ret	ASS1; 16	ASS2; Ret	SAC1; 14	SAC2; Ret	BRN; 12	SIL1; Ret	SIL2; 16	MIS; 5	ARA1; 5	ARA2; Ret	15th	45
2014	JER1; 6	JER1; 5	MUG; Ret	ASS1; 10	ASS2; 11	SAC1; Ret	SAC2; 13	BRN1; 18	BRN2; Ret	SIL1; 10	SIL2; 12	MIS; DNS	ARA1; 13	ARA2; 9	13th	55

=== Grand Prix motorcycle racing ===
==== By season ====
Season	Class	Motorcycle	Team	Race	Win	Podium	Pole	FLap	Pts	Plcd
2015	Moto3	Mahindra MGP3O	Outox Reset Drink Team	18	0	0	0	0	0	NC
2016	Moto3	Mahindra MGP30	Platinum Bay Real Estate	18	0	0	0	0	27	25th
2017	Moto3	KTM RC250GP	Platinum Bay Real Estate	13	0	0	0	0	35	19th
2018	Moto3	KTM RC250GP	Red Bull KTM Ajo	16	0	1	0	1	57	17th
2019	Moto3	KTM RC250GP	CIP Green Power	19	0	1	0	1	54	22nd
2020	Moto3	KTM RC250GP	CIP Green Power	15	1	2	1	2	122	8th
2021	Moto3	Honda NSF250RW	Petronas Sprinta Racing	18	0	2	2	2	136	7th
2022	MotoGP	Yamaha YZR-M1	WithU Yamaha RNF MotoGP Team	20	0	0	0	0	12	24th
2023	Moto2	Kalex	Liqui Moly Husqvarna Intact GP	14	0	0	0	0	34	20th
2024	Moto2	Kalex	Liqui Moly Husqvarna Intact GP	20	0	0	0	0	55	19th
2025	Moto2	Kalex	Gresini Moto2	17	0	0	0	0	19	24th
Total				**188**	**1**	**6**	**3**	**6**	**551**	

==== By class ====
Class	Seasons	1st GP	1st pod	1st win	Race	Win	Podiums	Pole	FLap	Pts	WChmp
Moto3	2015–2021	2015 Qatar	2018 Japan	2020 Catalunya	117	1	6	3	6	431	0
Moto2	2023–	2023 Portugal			51	0	0	0	0	108	0
MotoGP	2022	2022 Qatar			20	0	0	0	0	12	0
Total	2015–present				**188**	**1**	**6**	**3**	**6**	**551**	**0**

==== Races by year ====
(key) (Races in bold indicate pole position, races in italics indicate fastest lap)

Year	Class	Bike	1	2	3	4	5	6	7	8	9	10	11	12	13	14	15	16	17	18	19	20	21	22	Pos	Pts
2015	Moto3	Mahindra	QAT; 19	AME; Ret	ARG; 24	SPA; 24	FRA; Ret	ITA; 18	CAT; Ret	NED; 19	GER; 20	INP; 27	CZE; 16	GBR; Ret	RSM; 18	ARA; Ret	JPN; 27	AUS; Ret	MAL; Ret	VAL; 18					NC	0
2016	Moto3	Mahindra	QAT; 23	ARG; 30	AME; Ret	SPA; Ret	FRA; Ret	ITA; Ret	CAT; 12	NED; 17	GER; Ret	AUT; 17	CZE; Ret	GBR; 21	RSM; Ret	ARA; 26	JPN; 22	AUS; 4	MAL; 10	VAL; 12					25th	27
2017	Moto3	KTM	QAT; 13	ARG; 12	AME; 10	SPA; 20	FRA; Ret	ITA; 4	CAT; Ret	NED; 13	GER; 10	CZE	AUT	GBR	RSM	ARA; 22	JPN; 20	AUS; 24	MAL; Ret	VAL; DNS					19th	35
2018	Moto3	KTM	QAT; Ret	ARG; 22	AME; 13	SPA; DNS	FRA; 10	ITA; 13	CAT; Ret	NED; 7	GER	CZE; 23	AUT; 19	GBR; C	SMR; 8	ARA; 18	THA; Ret	JPN; 3	AUS; 12	MAL; 7	VAL; 19				17th	57
2019	Moto3	KTM	QAT; Ret	ARG; 2	AME; 15	SPA; 11	FRA; Ret	ITA; 10	CAT; 15	NED; Ret	GER; Ret	CZE; 10	AUT; 15	GBR; 12	RSM; Ret	ARA; 17	THA; 20	JPN; Ret	AUS; 6	MAL; Ret	VAL; Ret				22nd	54
2020	Moto3	KTM	QAT; Ret	SPA; 18	ANC; 4	CZE; 12	AUT; 6	STY; 6	RSM; Ret	EMI; Ret	CAT; 1	FRA; Ret	ARA; 2	TER; 8	EUR; 5	**VAL**; 5	POR; 6								8th	122
2021	Moto3	Honda	**QAT**; 3	DOH; 2	POR; 20	SPA; 22	FRA; 20	ITA; 5	CAT; 5	GER; 14	NED; 7	STY; 6	AUT; 9	GBR; 7	**ARA**; 7	RSM; 6	AME; 7	EMI; 4	ALR; DSQ	VAL; Ret					7th	136
2022	MotoGP	Yamaha	QAT; 16	INA; 10	ARG; 18	AME; 22	POR; 17	SPA; Ret	FRA; 17	ITA; 16	CAT; 12	GER; Ret	NED; Ret	GBR; 20	AUT; Ret	RSM; 16	ARA; 18	JPN; Ret	THA; 21	AUS; 14	MAL; Ret	VAL; Ret			24th	12
2023	Moto2	Kalex	POR; 16	ARG; 6	AME; DNS	SPA	FRA	ITA; Ret	GER; Ret	NED; 14	GBR; 15	AUT; Ret	CAT	RSM	IND; 7	JPN; 10	INA; 13	AUS; Ret	THA; 15	MAL; DNS	QAT; 14	VAL; 20			20th	34
2024	Moto2	Kalex	QAT; 18	POR; 15	AME; 27	SPA; 19	FRA; 14	CAT; 14	ITA; Ret	NED; 15	GER; 25	GBR; 6	AUT; 7	ARA; 9	RSM; 10	EMI; 16	INA; 5	JPN; 15	AUS; 12	THA; Ret	MAL; Ret	SLD; 15			19th	55
2025	Moto2	Kalex	THA; 17	ARG; 6	AME; DNS	QAT; Ret	SPA; 19	FRA; DNS	GBR	ARA; Ret	ITA; 21	NED; Ret	GER; 15	CZE; 17	AUT; 15	HUN; Ret	CAT; 21	RSM; 23	JPN; Ret	INA; 11	AUS; 14	MAL; Ret	POR	VAL	24th	19

* Season still in progress.
