= 2015 Japanese motorcycle Grand Prix =

Grand Prix motorcycle race

(Japan) 2015 Japanese Grand Prix
Race details
- Race 15 of 18 races in the 2015 Grand Prix motorcycle racing season
- Date: 11 October 2015
- Official name: Motul Grand Prix of Japan
- Location: Twin Ring Motegi
- Course: Permanent racing facility; 4.801 km (2.983 mi)

MotoGP
Pole position
Rider	(Spain) Jorge Lorenzo	Yamaha
Time	1:43.790	
Fastest lap
Rider	(Spain) Jorge Lorenzo	Yamaha
Time	1:54.867 on lap 3	
Podium
First	(Spain) Dani Pedrosa	Honda
Second	(Italy) Valentino Rossi	Yamaha
Third	(Spain) Jorge Lorenzo	Yamaha

Moto2
Pole position
Rider	(France) Johann Zarco	Kalex
Time	1:50.339	
Fastest lap
Rider	(Germany) Jonas Folger	Kalex
Time	2:04.166 on lap 2	
Podium
First	(France) Johann Zarco	Kalex
Second	(Germany) Jonas Folger	Kalex
Third	(Germany) Sandro Cortese	Kalex

Moto3
Pole position
Rider	(Italy) Romano Fenati	KTM
Time	1:56.484	
Fastest lap
Rider	(Spain) Isaac Viñales	KTM
Time	2:07.602 on lap 9	
Podium
First	(Italy) Niccolò Antonelli	Honda
Second	(Portugal) Miguel Oliveira	KTM
Third	(Spain) Jorge Navarro	Honda

The 2015 Japanese motorcycle Grand Prix was the fifteenth round of the 2015 Grand Prix motorcycle racing season, consisting of the MotoGP, Moto2 and Moto3 classes. It was held at the Twin Ring Motegi in Motegi on 11 October 2015.

In the premier class, the race began in damp conditions but dried out over the course of the race. Jorge Lorenzo had started on pole but faded to third with tyre issues, and it was Dani Pedrosa that achieved his first victory since the 2014 Czech Republic Grand Prix, and as a result, became the eighth rider to record 50 victories at World Championship level. Valentino Rossi extended his championship lead to eighteen with a second-place finish, ahead of Lorenzo.

During free practice, Alex de Angelis crashed heavily and was taken to hospital in a critical but stable condition. De Angelis missed the remainder of the season as a result of the crash.

In the intermediate Moto2 class, Tito Rabat pulled out of the weekend due to injury and as a result, Johann Zarco won his first World Championship title, and the first by a French rider in the intermediate class since Olivier Jacque in 2000. Zarco went on to win the shortened race ahead of German duo Jonas Folger and Sandro Cortese. In the Moto3 race also shortened by weather delays, Niccolò Antonelli took his second win of the season ahead of Miguel Oliveira and Jorge Navarro, while championship leader Danny Kent maintained his points lead with sixth place.

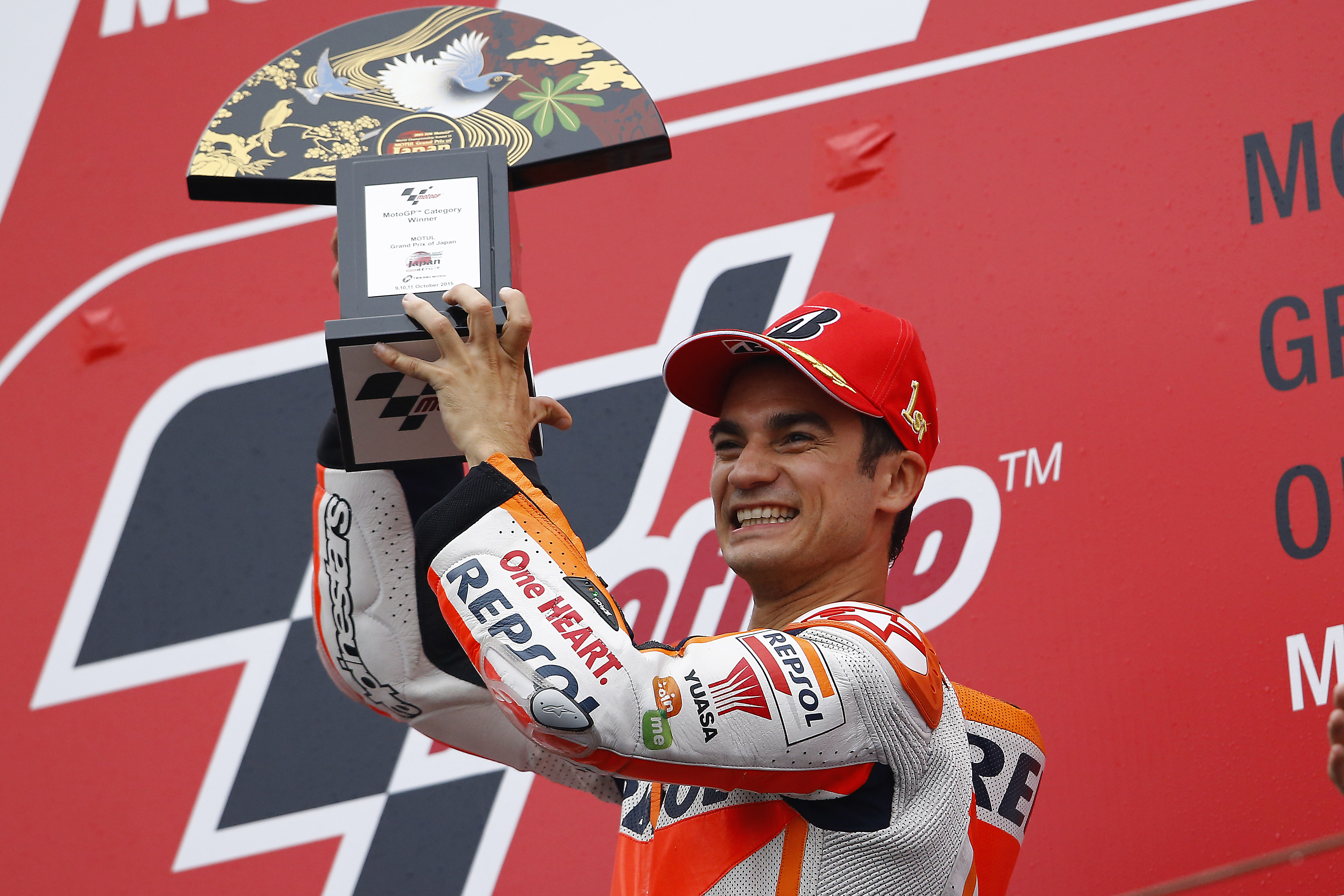
Dani Pedrosa, celebrating on the podium after winning the MotoGP race.

== Classification ==
=== MotoGP ===
Pos.	No.	Rider	Team	Manufacturer	Laps	Time/Retired	Grid	Points
1	26	(Spain) Dani Pedrosa	Repsol Honda Team	Honda	24	46:50.767	6	25
2	46	(Italy) Valentino Rossi	Movistar Yamaha MotoGP	Yamaha	24	+8.573	2	20
3	99	(Spain) Jorge Lorenzo	Movistar Yamaha MotoGP	Yamaha	24	+12.127	1	16
4	93	(Spain) Marc Márquez	Repsol Honda Team	Honda	24	+27.841	3	13
5	4	(Italy) Andrea Dovizioso	Ducati Team	Ducati	24	+35.085	4	11
6	35	(United Kingdom) Cal Crutchlow	LCR Honda	Honda	24	+37.263	8	10
7	38	(United Kingdom) Bradley Smith	Monster Yamaha Tech 3	Yamaha	24	+37.667	9	9
8	21	(Japan) Katsuyuki Nakasuga	Yamaha Factory Racing Team	Yamaha	24	+44.654	15	8
9	8	(Spain) Héctor Barberá	Avintia Racing	Ducati	24	+48.572	18	7
10	45	(United Kingdom) Scott Redding	EG 0,0 Marc VDS	Honda	24	+50.121	12	6
11	41	(Spain) Aleix Espargaró	Team Suzuki Ecstar	Suzuki	24	+1:00.535	7	5
12	72	(Japan) Takumi Takahashi	Team HRC with Nissin	Honda	24	+1:01.211	19	4
13	69	(United States) Nicky Hayden	Aspar MotoGP Team	Honda	24	+1:11.261	21	3
14	68	(Colombia) Yonny Hernández	Octo Pramac Racing	Ducati	24	+1:13.896	14	2
15	63	(France) Mike Di Meglio	Avintia Racing	Ducati	24	+1:15.421	24	1
16	19	(Spain) Álvaro Bautista	Aprilia Racing Team Gresini	Aprilia	24	+1:20.507	16	
17	50	(Republic of Ireland) Eugene Laverty	Aspar MotoGP Team	Honda	24	+1:31.224	20	
18	6	(Germany) Stefan Bradl	Aprilia Racing Team Gresini	Aprilia	24	+1:46.833	13	
19	64	(Japan) Kousuke Akiyoshi	AB Motoracing	Honda	24	+2:00.072	26	
20	24	(Spain) Toni Elías	Forward Racing	Yamaha Forward	23	+1 lap	25	
Ret	44	(Spain) Pol Espargaró	Monster Yamaha Tech 3	Yamaha	22	Accident	11	
Ret	43	(Australia) Jack Miller	LCR Honda	Honda	16	Accident	22	
Ret	25	(Spain) Maverick Viñales	Team Suzuki Ecstar	Suzuki	13	Accident	10	
Ret	76	(France) Loris Baz	Forward Racing	Yamaha Forward	13	Handling	23	
Ret	29	(Italy) Andrea Iannone	Ducati Team	Ducati	10	Engine	5	
Ret	9	(Italy) Danilo Petrucci	Octo Pramac Racing	Ducati	8	Accident	17	
DNS	15	(San Marino) Alex de Angelis	E-Motion IodaRacing Team	ART		Did not start		

=== Moto2 ===
Due to weather conditions which caused delays in the schedule, the race distance was reduced from 23 to 15 laps.

Pos.	No.	Rider	Manufacturer	Laps	Time/Retired	Grid	Points
1	5	(France) Johann Zarco	Kalex	15	31:17.900	1	25
2	94	(Germany) Jonas Folger	Kalex	15	+4.505	3	20
3	11	(Germany) Sandro Cortese	Kalex	15	+15.433	9	16
4	25	(Malaysia) Azlan Shah	Kalex	15	+17.348	12	13
5	55	(Malaysia) Hafizh Syahrin	Kalex	15	+22.858	6	11
6	88	(Spain) Ricard Cardús	Suter	15	+24.970	17	10
7	3	(Italy) Simone Corsi	Kalex	15	+25.759	16	9
8	22	(United Kingdom) Sam Lowes	Speed Up	15	+27.024	4	8
9	23	(Germany) Marcel Schrötter	Tech 3	15	+27.485	21	7
10	4	(Switzerland) Randy Krummenacher	Kalex	15	+28.062	18	6
11	40	(Spain) Álex Rins	Kalex	15	+30.768	5	5
12	7	(Italy) Lorenzo Baldassarri	Kalex	15	+32.685	10	4
13	71	(Japan) Tomoyoshi Koyama	NTS	15	+33.995	29	3
14	72	(Japan) Yuki Takahashi	Moriwaki	15	+36.582	25	2
15	36	(Finland) Mika Kallio	Speed Up	15	+43.672	20	1
16	60	(Spain) Julián Simón	Speed Up	15	+48.256	14	
17	2	(Switzerland) Jesko Raffin	Kalex	15	+49.421	28	
18	73	(Spain) Álex Márquez	Kalex	15	+51.712	15	
19	57	(Spain) Edgar Pons	Kalex	15	+1:20.982	24	
20	96	(France) Louis Rossi	Tech 3	15	+1:31.219	26	
21	66	(Germany) Florian Alt	Suter	15	+1:36.116	30	
22	30	(Japan) Takaaki Nakagami	Kalex	15	+1:41.127	7	
23	70	(Switzerland) Robin Mulhauser	Kalex	13	+2 laps	22	
Ret	39	(Spain) Luis Salom	Kalex	9	Accident	13	
Ret	10	(Thailand) Thitipong Warokorn	Kalex	8	Accident	19	
Ret	12	(Switzerland) Thomas Lüthi	Kalex	7	Accident Damage	2	
Ret	19	(Belgium) Xavier Siméon	Kalex	5	Front Tyre Wear	11	
Ret	97	(Spain) Xavi Vierge	Tech 3	4	Accident	27	
Ret	49	(Spain) Axel Pons	Kalex	4	Retirement	8	
Ret	16	(Australia) Joshua Hook	Kalex	3	Accident	23	
DNS	1	(Spain) Tito Rabat	Kalex		Did not start		
OFFICIAL MOTO2 REPORT

=== Moto3 ===
Due to weather conditions which caused delays in the schedule, the race distance was reduced from 20 to 13 laps.

Pos.	No.	Rider	Manufacturer	Laps	Time/Retired	Grid	Points
1	23	(Italy) Niccolò Antonelli	Honda	13	28:03.391	2	25
2	44	(Portugal) Miguel Oliveira	KTM	13	+1.053	5	20
3	9	(Spain) Jorge Navarro	Honda	13	+8.529	6	16
4	32	(Spain) Isaac Viñales	KTM	13	+11.074	7	13
5	63	(Malaysia) Zulfahmi Khairuddin	KTM	13	+13.043	15	11
6	52	(United Kingdom) Danny Kent	Honda	13	+15.224	4	10
7	33	(Italy) Enea Bastianini	Honda	13	+15.873	3	9
8	98	(Czech Republic) Karel Hanika	KTM	13	+17.563	19	8
9	17	(United Kingdom) John McPhee	Honda	13	+18.153	24	7
10	7	(Spain) Efrén Vázquez	Honda	13	+18.556	27	6
11	88	(Spain) Jorge Martín	Mahindra	13	+19.896	23	5
12	84	(Czech Republic) Jakub Kornfeil	KTM	13	+20.892	11	4
13	24	(Japan) Tatsuki Suzuki	Mahindra	13	+25.145	20	3
14	55	(Italy) Andrea Locatelli	Honda	13	+28.455	34	2
15	21	(Italy) Francesco Bagnaia	Mahindra	13	+28.849	10	1
16	91	(Argentina) Gabriel Rodrigo	KTM	13	+29.988	25	
17	41	(South Africa) Brad Binder	KTM	13	+30.719	9	
18	29	(Italy) Stefano Manzi	Mahindra	13	+31.949	21	
19	95	(France) Jules Danilo	Honda	13	+32.146	28	
20	16	(Italy) Andrea Migno	KTM	13	+35.048	17	
21	58	(Spain) Juan Francisco Guevara	Mahindra	13	+47.242	14	
22	96	(Italy) Manuel Pagliani	Mahindra	13	+48.796	18	
23	65	(Germany) Philipp Öttl	KTM	13	+49.372	13	
24	48	(Italy) Lorenzo Dalla Porta	Husqvarna	13	+56.860	16	
25	27	(Japan) Keisuke Kurihara	Honda	13	+59.731	35	
26	6	(Spain) María Herrera	Husqvarna	13	+1:07.035	26	
27	40	(South Africa) Darryn Binder	Mahindra	13	+1:19.621	30	
28	5	(Italy) Romano Fenati	KTM	13	+1:29.664	1	
29	22	(Spain) Ana Carrasco	KTM	13	+1:52.305	33	
Ret	2	(Australia) Remy Gardner	Mahindra	10	Accident	29	
Ret	11	(Belgium) Livio Loi	Honda	4	Accident Damage	8	
Ret	76	(Japan) Hiroki Ono	Honda	2	Accident	12	
Ret	34	(Japan) Ryo Mizuno	Honda	1	Accident	32	
Ret	10	(France) Alexis Masbou	Honda	1	Accident	22	
Ret	19	(Italy) Alessandro Tonucci	Mahindra	1	Retirement	31	
DNS	20	(France) Fabio Quartararo	Honda		Did not start		
OFFICIAL MOTO3 REPORT

== Championship standings after the race (MotoGP) ==
Below are the standings for the top five riders and constructors after round fifteen has concluded.

Riders' Championship standings

Pos.	Rider	Points
1	(Italy) Valentino Rossi	283
2	(Spain) Jorge Lorenzo	265
3	(Spain) Marc Márquez	197
4	(Italy) Andrea Iannone	172
5	(Spain) Dani Pedrosa	154

Constructors' Championship standings

Pos.	Constructor	Points
1	(Japan) Yamaha	342
2	(Japan) Honda	285
3	(Italy) Ducati	221
4	(Japan) Suzuki	110
5	(Switzerland) Yamaha Forward	33

Teams' Championship standings

Pos.	Team	Points
1	(Japan) Movistar Yamaha MotoGP	548
2	(Japan) Repsol Honda Team	356
3	(Italy) Ducati Team	322
4	(France) Monster Yamaha Tech 3	240
5	(Japan) Team Suzuki Ecstar	155

- Note: Only the top five positions are included for both sets of standings.

Previous race: 2015 Aragon Grand Prix	FIM Grand Prix World Championship; 2015 season	Next race: 2015 Australian Grand Prix
Previous race: 2014 Japanese Grand Prix	Japanese motorcycle Grand Prix	Next race: 2016 Japanese Grand Prix
