= Pramac Racing =

Italian-based motorcycle racing team

- 2026 name: MotoGP: Prima Pramac Yamaha MotoGP; Moto2: Blu Cru Pramac Yamaha Moto2
- Base: Casole d'Elsa, Tuscany, Italy
- Principal: Paolo Campinoti; Gino Borsoi (Manager)
- Rider(s): MotoGP: 7. Toprak Razgatlıoğlu; 43. Jack Miller; Moto2: 28. Izan Guevara; 54. Alberto Ferrández
- Motorcycle: MotoGP: Yamaha YZR-M1; Moto2: Boscoscuro B-26
- Tyres: MotoGP: Michelin; Moto2: Pirelli
- Riders' Championships: 1; 2024 : Jorge Martín
- Teams' Championships: 1; 2023

Pramac Racing is a motorcycle racing team competing in the MotoGP World Championship under the name Prima Pramac Yamaha MotoGP as a Yamaha satellite team and the Moto2 World Championship as Blu Cru Pramac Yamaha Moto2. The team is based in Casole d'Elsa, Tuscany, Italy.

== History ==
=== Pre-history: d'Antin MotoGP and original Pramac Racing team ===
==== d'Antin MotoGP ====
The d'Antin MotoGP team was created in 1999 by Spanish former motorcycle racer Luis d'Antin and was based in Madrid. Beginning in 1999 the team raced in the 250 cc Spanish and World Championships with Yamaha bikes and Spanish riders Fonsi Nieto and David García.

In the same season the team ran in the 500 cc class with Japanese rider Norifumi Abe aboard a Yamaha YZR500. Abe took a win in 2000 at the Japanese Grand Prix at Suzuka. José Luis Cardoso joined the team in 2001 as second rider alongside Abe; a podium finish was the team's best result that year.

In 2002 the 500 cc class became MotoGP and the D'Antin team continued with the same Yamaha YZR500 and Pere Riba as Abe's teammate (Alex Criville was the original plan, but he retired before the start of the season, and Cardoso also acted as Riba's injury substitute during the season). The 500 cc 2-stroke motorcycle was not able to compete against the more powerful 990 cc 4-strokes (although Abe was given the new 4-stroke Yamaha YZR-M1 for the last two races of the season) and top 10 finishes were the team's best results. The YZR-M1 was used full-time in 2003, with Shinya Nakano as the team's only rider.

The team switched to Ducati motorcycles in 2004 using the previous season's Desmosedici GP3 and signing 2003 Superbike World Champion Neil Hodgson and runner-up Rubén Xaus, Ducati's factory riders for the 2003 World Superbike Championship season. During the season, the team ran into financial difficulties (a planned sponsorship deal with Visa fell through) and was not able to run a test program; their best result was a third place for Xaus in Qatar.

==== Original iteration of Pramac Racing and tie-up with Pons Racing (2002-2004) ====
Owned and operated by the Italian power generator manufacturer of the same name, Pramac Racing first entered MotoGP in 2002, taking over the activities of Hardwick Racing (who competed as Shell Advance Honda Team), relocating to Italy and using the Honda NSR500 with Tetsuya Harada as a rider. A 500 cc holdout in the inaugural 990 cc-era season, Harada only scored one top five finish and retired at the end of the year.

In September 2002, Pramac signed a three-year deal with Max Biaggi and Honda Racing Corporation to enter a Honda RC211V for 2003. Two months later, Pramac and Pons Racing reached an agreement whereby Biaggi would have competed for Pons while still under contract with Pramac. The combined entry was called Camel Pramac Pons in official entry lists. That same season, Pramac also entered an entry under the Pramac Honda banner for Makoto Tamada, being the only Honda team to use Bridgestone tyres. A podium in Brazil was the team's best result, while Biaggi scored two wins and finished the championship in third place.

The Pramac-Pons relationship followed to 2004, where Tamada and his team, led by Luca Montiron, joined Sito Pons' structure, replacing Tohru Ukawa on the Pons team. Tamada still raced on Bridgestone tyres while Biaggi used Michelin tyres. Tamada finished the season with two wins and sixth place in the final championship standings; Biaggi clinched a win and the third place overall.

At the conclusion of the 2004 season, Pramac ended its relationship with Pons Racing to start a new project with Ducati and d'Antin. Biaggi terminated his contract with Pramac and joined the Repsol Honda works team, while Luca Montiron also left the team and founded JiR with Tamada as a rider.

=== Pramac d'Antin and Alice Team (2005-2008) ===
In 2005 d'Antin MotoGP and Pramac Racing merged to form Pramac d'Antin. The team used the previous season's Desmosedici GP4 with Italian Roberto Rolfo as a rider. The team used Dunlop tyres and usually finished races near the back of the grid.

For 2006 the team was given use of the Desmosedici GP6. the same motorcycles the factory team was using. Alex Hofmann and José Luis Cardoso were the team's riders. The Dunlop tyres the team used were not competitive and once again the team finished races near the back of the grid.

Prior to the start of the 2007 season, Pramac and d'Antin reached an agreement that saw the d'Antin team becoming an integral part of the Pramac Group. The team used the new 800 cc Ducati Desmosedici GP7 and Bridgestone tyres, and Brazilian Alex Barros joined the team alongside Alex Hofmann. Barros had a strong season finishing regularly in the top ten and taking a podium finish at the Italian Grand Prix, beating works rider Casey Stoner into fourth place. Hofmann, meanwhile, had a more average season and he injured his hand in practice at Mazda Raceway Laguna Seca. He was replaced by Chaz Davies for the remainder of the weekend, and by Iván Silva at Brno. Hofmann returned to racing at Misano but he was fired by the team following the Portuguese Grand Prix, after pulling out of the race while in with a chance of scoring points, due to a lack of motivation. Davies returned to complete the season.

In 2008, the team continued using the Ducati Desmosedici GP8 and Bridgestone tyres. Sylvain Guintoli and Toni Elías were the team's riders, while the team was sponsored by Alice, Telecom Italia's DSL service, and was renamed the Alice Team. Luis d'Antin resigned from the team midway through the 2008 season, at the German Grand Prix at the Sachsenring.

=== Pramac Racing (2008-present) ===
==== The Ducati era ====
For the 2009 season, the team reverted to the 2002-2003 name of Pramac Racing, using the Ducati Desmosedici GP9 and Bridgestone tyres with Mika Kallio and Niccolò Canepa as the team's riders.

On 19 August 2009 it was announced Aleix Espargaró would race for Pramac in Indianapolis and Misano, the seat having been filled by Michel Fabrizio at Brno. He temporarily replaced Kallio who in turn filled in for Casey Stoner at the Ducati works team.

Kallio and Espargaró raced for Pramac for the 2010 season.

The Pramac team competed in the 2011 championship with riders Loris Capirossi and Randy de Puniet and achieving a sixth place as a best race result. Damian Cudlin and Sylvain Guintoli entered some races replacing an injured Capirossi.

In 2012 Pramac Racing fielded only one bike for Héctor Barberá. For 2013, Pramac Racing received the factory supported team Ducati status and fielded two factory-specification Desmosedici for works riders Andrea Iannone and Ben Spies.

Spies was injured for all but the first two races of that season and was replaced by Michele Pirro and later Yonny Hernández, who ended up securing a ride for the team in the 2014 season alongside the confirmed Iannone. Iannone used the factory-supported GP14 bike, while Hernandez rode a year-old GP13.

For 2015, Iannone was promoted to the factory Ducati team, to replace Cal Crutchlow. Iannone was replaced by Danilo Petrucci at Pramac. Hernández retained with the team, both of them were riding with the Ducati Desmosedici GP14.

In 2016, Scott Redding joined the team. Petrucci retained with the team, both of them were riding with the Ducati Desmosedici GP15.

In 2017, the Pramac team received a factory-specification Ducati Desmosedici for Petrucci - as his championship standing was ahead from Redding in 2016 - while Redding riding with a one-year old Ducati Desmosedici.

In 2018, Jack Miller joined the team to replacing Redding, who was moved to the Aprilia Racing Team Gresini. As usual, Petrucci riding with GP18 bike while Miller riding with GP17 bike.

In 2019, Petrucci was promoted to the factory Ducati team, to replace Jorge Lorenzo. Petrucci was replaced by Francesco Bagnaia - the 2018 Moto2 World Champion - at Pramac. Miller was promoted to riding a Ducati Desmosedici GP19, whilst Bagnaia used the year-old Ducati Desmosedici GP18.

For 2020, for the first time since 2013, the Pramac Racing fielded two factory-specification Ducati Desmosedici GP20 bike for works riders Miller and Bagnaia - both riders are riding with the same bike for the first time since 2016.

For 2021, Johann Zarco and Jorge Martín joined the team after their last season with Esponsorama Racing and Moto2, respectively, riding on the Ducati Desmosedici GP21. The team scored its first ever premier class victory at the Styrian GP by Jorge Martín.

In 2023, Pramac Racing won the MotoGP teams' championship, becoming the first independent team to take that title.

In 2024, Martín finished 3rd in the 2024 Solidarity Grand Prix with a Desmosedici GP24 which crowned him the 2024 World Championship.

Martín made history as the first champion from an independent team in the MotoGP era, since Valentino Rossi with Nastro Azzurro Honda in 2001, while Pramac Racing also won the Best Independent Team award four times in a row.

Martín left Pramac for Aprilia while Franco Morbidelli joined VR46 Racing Team after the season.

==== The Yamaha era and the Moto2 debut ====
For 2025, Jack Miller and Miguel Oliveira will ride factory-spec Yamaha bikes as Pramac Racing moved on from Ducati.

On 10 June 2025, Yamaha announced that Toprak Razgatlıoğlu will be racing in 2026, moving from the BMW Motorrad WorldSBK Team in the Superbike World Championship. with Miller retaining his seat into 2026.

Moto2 rider Izan Guevara, who currently competes with Pramac, will step up to the MotoGP in 2027 to replace Miller.

== Results ==
=== Grand Prix motorcycle racing ===
==== By rider ====
Year	Class	Team name	Bike	No.	Riders	Races	Wins	Podiums	Poles	F. laps	Points	Pos.
2002	MotoGP	Antena 3 Yamaha d'Antin	Yamaha YZR-M1	6	(Japan) Norifumi Abe	1	0	0	0	0	129	6th
2002	MotoGP	Antena 3 Yamaha d'Antin	Yamaha YZR500	6	(Japan) Norifumi Abe	14	0	0	0	0	129	6th
2002	MotoGP	Antena 3 Yamaha d'Antin	Yamaha YZR500	30	(Spain) José Luis Cardoso	6	0	0	0	0	9	23rd
2002	MotoGP	Antena 3 Yamaha d'Antin	Yamaha YZR500	20	(Spain) Pere Riba	6	0	0	0	0	4	27th
2002	MotoGP	Pramac Honda Racing Team	Honda NSR500	31	(Japan) Tetsuya Harada	16	0	0	0	0	47	17th
2003	MotoGP	Pramac Honda	Honda RC211V	6	(Japan) Makoto Tamada	15	0	1	0	0	87	11th
2003	MotoGP	d'Antín Yamaha Team	Yamaha YZR-M1	56	(Japan) Shinya Nakano	16	0	0	0	0	101	10th
2004	MotoGP	D'Antin MotoGP	Ducati Desmosedici GP3	11	(Spain) Rubén Xaus	16	0	1	0	0	77	11th
2004	MotoGP	D'Antin MotoGP	Ducati Desmosedici GP3	50	(United Kingdom) Neil Hodgson	16	0	0	0	0	38	17th
2005	MotoGP	D'Antin MotoGP – Pramac; Team d'Antin Pramac	Ducati Desmosedici GP4	44	(Italy) Roberto Rolfo	17	0	0	0	0	25	18th
2006	MotoGP	Pramac d'Antin MotoGP	Ducati Desmosedici GP5	66	(Germany) Alex Hofmann	14 (17) (Note: Non-bracketed number refers to the number accumulated with team, with number in brackets referring to the total accumulated for the season.)	0	0	0	0	23 (30)	17th
2006	MotoGP	Pramac d'Antin MotoGP	Ducati Desmosedici GP5	30	(Spain) José Luis Cardoso	17	0	0	0	0	10	20th
2006	MotoGP	Pramac d'Antin MotoGP	Ducati Desmosedici GP5	22	(Spain) Iván Silva	3	0	0	0	0	0	NC
2007	MotoGP	Pramac d'Antin	Ducati Desmosedici GP7	4	(Brazil) Alex Barros	18	0	1	0	0	115	10th
2007	MotoGP	Pramac d'Antin	Ducati Desmosedici GP7	66	(Germany) Alex Hofmann	11	0	0	0	0	65	13th
2007	MotoGP	Pramac d'Antin	Ducati Desmosedici GP7	72	(Japan) Shinichi Ito	1	0	0	0	0	1	26th
2007	MotoGP	Pramac d'Antin	Ducati Desmosedici GP7	57	(United Kingdom) Chaz Davies	3	0	0	0	0	0	NC
2007	MotoGP	Pramac d'Antin	Ducati Desmosedici GP7	22	(Spain) Iván Silva	1	0	0	0	0	0	NC
2008	MotoGP	Alice Team	Ducati Desmosedici GP8	24	(Spain) Toni Elías	17	0	2	0	0	92	12th
2008	MotoGP	Alice Team	Ducati Desmosedici GP8	50	(France) Sylvain Guintoli	18	0	0	0	0	67	13th
2009	MotoGP	Pramac Racing	Ducati Desmosedici GP9	36	(Finland) Mika Kallio	13 (16)	0	0	0	0	54 (71)	15th
2009	MotoGP	Pramac Racing	Ducati Desmosedici GP9	88	(Italy) Niccolò Canepa	14	0	0	0	0	38	16th
2009	MotoGP	Pramac Racing	Ducati Desmosedici GP9	44	(Spain) Aleix Espargaró	4	0	0	0	0	16	18th
2009	MotoGP	Pramac Racing	Ducati Desmosedici GP9	84	(Italy) Michel Fabrizio	1	0	0	0	0	0	NC
2010	MotoGP	Pramac Racing Team	Ducati Desmosedici GP10	41	(Spain) Aleix Espargaró	18	0	0	0	0	65	14th
2010	MotoGP	Pramac Racing Team	Ducati Desmosedici GP10	36	(Finland) Mika Kallio	16	0	0	0	0	43	17th
2010	MotoGP	Pramac Racing Team	Ducati Desmosedici GP10	71	(Spain) Carlos Checa	2	0	0	0	0	1	21st
2011	MotoGP	Pramac Racing Team	Ducati Desmosedici GP11	14	(France) Randy de Puniet	16	0	0	0	0	49	16th
2011	MotoGP	Pramac Racing Team	Ducati Desmosedici GP11	65	(Italy) Loris Capirossi	13	0	0	0	0	43	17th
2011	MotoGP	Pramac Racing Team	Ducati Desmosedici GP11	50	(France) Sylvain Guintoli	1	0	0	0	0	0	NC
2011	MotoGP	Pramac Racing Team	Ducati Desmosedici GP11	6	(Australia) Damian Cudlin	1	0	0	0	0	0	NC
2012	MotoGP	Pramac Racing Team	Ducati Desmosedici GP12	8	(Spain) Héctor Barberá	15	0	0	0	0	83	11th
2012	MotoGP	Pramac Racing Team	Ducati Desmosedici GP12	24	(Spain) Toni Elías	3	0	0	0	0	10	24th
2013	MotoGP	Energy T.I. Pramac Racing	Ducati Desmosedici GP13	29	(Italy) Andrea Iannone	16	0	0	0	0	57	12th
2013	MotoGP	Ignite Pramac Racing	Ducati Desmosedici GP13	51	(Italy) Michele Pirro	7 (10)	0	0	0	0	36 (56)	13th
2013	MotoGP	Ignite Pramac Racing	Ducati Desmosedici GP13	68	(Colombia) Yonny Hernández	5 (13)	0	0	0	0	14 (21)	18th
2013	MotoGP	Ignite Pramac Racing	Ducati Desmosedici GP13	11	(United States) Ben Spies	2	0	0	0	0	9	21st
2013	MotoGP	Ignite Pramac Racing	Ducati Desmosedici GP13	15	(San Marino) Alex de Angelis	1	0	0	0	0	5	23rd
2014	MotoGP	Pramac Racing	Ducati Desmosedici GP14	29	(Italy) Andrea Iannone	17	0	0	0	0	102	10th
2014	MotoGP	Energy T.I. Pramac Racing	Ducati Desmosedici GP13	68	(Colombia) Yonny Hernández	18	0	0	0	0	53	15th
2015	MotoGP	Pramac Racing; Octo Pramac Racing	Ducati Desmosedici GP14	9	(Italy) Danilo Petrucci	18	0	1	0	0	113	10th
2015	MotoGP	Pramac Racing; Octo Pramac Racing	Ducati Desmosedici GP14	68	(Colombia) Yonny Hernández	18	0	0	0	0	56	14th
2016	MotoGP	Octo Pramac Yakhnich	Ducati Desmosedici GP15	9	(Italy) Danilo Petrucci	14	0	0	0	1	75	14th
2016	MotoGP	Octo Pramac Yakhnich	Ducati Desmosedici GP15	45	(United Kingdom) Scott Redding	18	0	1	0	0	74	15th
2016	MotoGP	Octo Pramac Yakhnich	Ducati Desmosedici GP15	51	(Italy) Michele Pirro	3 (9)	0	0	0	0	12 (36)	19th
2017	MotoGP	Octo Pramac Racing	Ducati Desmosedici GP17	9	(Italy) Danilo Petrucci	18	0	4	0	0	124	8th
2017	MotoGP	Octo Pramac Racing	Ducati Desmosedici GP16	45	(United Kingdom) Scott Redding	18	0	0	0	1	64	14th
2018	MotoGP	Alma Pramac Racing	Ducati Desmosedici GP18	9	(Italy) Danilo Petrucci	18	0	1	0	1	176	8th
2018	MotoGP	Alma Pramac Racing	Ducati Desmosedici GP17	43	(Australia) Jack Miller	18	0	0	1	0	91	13th
2019	MotoGP	Alma Pramac Racing; Pramac Racing	Ducati Desmosedici GP19	43	(Australia) Jack Miller	19	0	5	0	1	165	8th
2019	MotoGP	Alma Pramac Racing; Pramac Racing	Ducati Desmosedici GP18	63	(Italy) Francesco Bagnaia	18	0	0	0	0	54	15th
2019	MotoE	Octo Pramac MotoE	Energica Ego Corsa	5	(San Marino) Alex de Angelis	6	0	0	1	0	47	7th
2019	MotoE	Octo Pramac MotoE	Energica Ego Corsa	16	(Australia) Joshua Hook	6	0	0	0	0	28	13th
2020	MotoGP	Pramac Racing	Ducati Desmosedici GP20	43	(Australia) Jack Miller	14	0	4	0	1	132	7th
2020	MotoGP	Pramac Racing	Ducati Desmosedici GP20	63	(Italy) Francesco Bagnaia	11	0	1	0	2	47	16th
2020	MotoGP	Pramac Racing	Ducati Desmosedici GP20	51	(Italy) Michele Pirro	2	0	0	0	0	4	23rd
2020	MotoE	Octo Pramac MotoE	Energica Ego Corsa	16	(Australia) Joshua Hook	7	0	1	0	0	52	8th
2020	MotoE	Octo Pramac MotoE	Energica Ego Corsa	15	(San Marino) Alex de Angelis	7	0	0	0	1	35	14th
2021	MotoGP	Pramac Racing	Ducati Desmosedici GP21	5	(France) Johann Zarco	18	0	4	1	2	173	5th
2021	MotoGP	Pramac Racing	Ducati Desmosedici GP21	89	(Spain) Jorge Martín	14	1	4	4	0	111	9th
2021	MotoGP	Pramac Racing	Ducati Desmosedici GP21	51	(Italy) Michele Pirro	1 (3)	0	0	0	0	3 (12)	23rd
2021	MotoGP	Pramac Racing	Ducati Desmosedici GP21	53	(Spain) Tito Rabat	2	0	0	0	0	1	27th
2021	MotoE	Octo Pramac MotoE	Energica Ego Corsa	61	(Italy) Alessandro Zaccone	6	1	3	0	0	80	5th
2021	MotoE	Octo Pramac MotoE	Energica Ego Corsa	68	(Colombia) Yonny Hernández	7	0	0	0	0	47	10th
2022	MotoGP	Pramac Racing; Prima Pramac Racing	Ducati Desmosedici GP22	5	(France) Johann Zarco	20	0	4	2	2	166	8th
2022	MotoGP	Pramac Racing; Prima Pramac Racing	Ducati Desmosedici GP22	89	(Spain) Jorge Martín	20	0	4	5	2	152	9th
2022	MotoE	Octo Pramac MotoE	Energica Ego Corsa	34	(Italy) Kevin Manfredi	12	0	0	0	0	58.5	12th
2022	MotoE	Octo Pramac MotoE	Energica Ego Corsa	12	(Spain) Xavi Forés	11	0	0	0	0	35.5	14th
2023	MotoGP	Prima Pramac Racing	Ducati Desmosedici GP23	89	(Spain) Jorge Martín	20	4	8	4	2	428	2nd
2023	MotoGP	Prima Pramac Racing	Ducati Desmosedici GP23	5	(France) Johann Zarco	20	1	6	0	2	225	5th
2023	MotoE	Prettl Pramac MotoE	Ducati V21L	53	(Spain) Tito Rabat	15	0	0	0	0	57	14th
2023	MotoE	Prettl Pramac MotoE	Ducati V21L	23	(Italy) Luca Salvadori	10	0	0	0	0	22	17th
2023	MotoE	Prettl Pramac MotoE	Ducati V21L	99	(Spain) Oscar Gutiérrez	4	0	0	0	0	15	19th
2023	MotoE	Prettl Pramac MotoE	Ducati V21L	16	(Italy) Andrea Migno	2	0	0	0	0	2	20th
2024	MotoGP	Prima Pramac Racing	Ducati Desmosedici GP24	89	(Spain) Jorge Martín	20	3	16	7	2	508	1st
2024	MotoGP	Prima Pramac Racing	Ducati Desmosedici GP24	21	(Italy) Franco Morbidelli	20	0	0	0	0	173	9th
2025	MotoGP	Prima Pramac Yamaha MotoGP	Yamaha YZR-M1	43	(Australia) Jack Miller	22	0	0	0	0	79	17th
2025	MotoGP	Prima Pramac Yamaha MotoGP	Yamaha YZR-M1	88	(Portugal) Miguel Oliveira	18	0	0	0	0	43	20th
2025	MotoGP	Prima Pramac Yamaha MotoGP	Yamaha YZR-M1	7	(Spain) Augusto Fernández	3 (8)	0	0	0	0	3 (8)	25th
2025	Moto2	BLU CRU Pramac Yamaha Moto2 Team	Boscoscuro B-25	28	(Spain) Izan Guevara	22	1	2	0	0	134	11th
2025	Moto2	BLU CRU Pramac Yamaha Moto2 Team	Boscoscuro B-25	14	(Italy) Tony Arbolino	22	0	1	0	0	76	19th
2026	MotoGP	Prima Pramac Yamaha MotoGP	Yamaha YZR-M1 (V4 Spec)	43	(Australia) Jack Miller	18	0	0	0	0	31*	19th*
2026	MotoGP	Prima Pramac Yamaha MotoGP	Yamaha YZR-M1 (V4 Spec)	7	(Turkey) Toprak Razgatlıoğlu	17	0	0	0	0	18*	22nd*
2026	MotoGP	Prima Pramac Yamaha MotoGP	Yamaha YZR-M1 (V4 Spec)	47	(Spain) Augusto Fernández	1 (5)	0	0	0	0	0 (6)*	24th*
2026	Moto2	BLU CRU Pramac Yamaha Moto2 Team	Boscoscuro B-26	28	(Spain) Izan Guevara	19	4	9	5	1	273*	2nd*
2026	Moto2	BLU CRU Pramac Yamaha Moto2 Team	Boscoscuro B-26	54	(Spain) Alberto Ferrández	16	0	0	0	0	17.5*	22nd*

=== MotoGP results ===
(key) (Races in bold indicate pole position; races in italics indicate fastest lap)

Year	Team	Motorcycle	Tyres	No.	Rider	Race																		Points	RC	Points	TC	Points	MC
Year	Team	Motorcycle	Tyres	No.	Rider	1	2	3	4	5	6	7	8	9	10	11	12	13	14	15	16	17	18	Points	RC	Points	TC	Points	MC
2002	Antena 3 Yamaha d'Antin	Yamaha YZR-M1	M			JPN	SAF	ESP	FRA	ITA	CAT	NED	GBR	GER	CZE	POR	RIO	PAC	MAL	AUS	VAL								
2002	Antena 3 Yamaha d'Antin	Yamaha YZR-M1	M	6	(Japan) Norifumi Abe															DNS	10			129	6th	142	6th	272	2nd
2002	Antena 3 Yamaha d'Antin	Yamaha YZR500	M	6	(Japan) Norifumi Abe	5	7	6	4	7	16	9	4	6	8	7	6	8	10					129	6th	142	6th	272	2nd
2002	Antena 3 Yamaha d'Antin	Yamaha YZR500	M	30	(Spain) José Luis Cardoso				16					13			11		16	15	Ret			9	23rd	142	6th	272	2nd
2002	Antena 3 Yamaha d'Antin	Yamaha YZR500	M	20	(Spain) Pere Riba	DNS	13	Ret		Ret	15	Ret	DNS		DNS	Ret		DNS						4	27th	142	6th	272	2nd
2002	Pramac Honda Racing Team	Honda NSR500	D	31	(Japan) Tetsuya Harada	11	12	10	Ret	10	13	13	11	Ret	15	10	13	15	Ret	14	14			47	17th	47	11th	390	1st
2003	Pramac Honda	Honda RC211V	B			JPN	SAF	ESP	FRA	ITA	CAT	NED	GBR	GER	CZE	POR	RIO	PAC	MAL	AUS	VAL								
2003	Pramac Honda	Honda RC211V	B	6	(Japan) Makoto Tamada	Ret	14	6	Ret	4	7	16	13	13	9	10	3	DSQ	10	10	10			87	11th	87	9th	395	1st
2003	d'Antín Yamaha Team	Yamaha YZR-M1	M	56	(Japan) Shinya Nakano	9	11	8	14	5	5	13	9	7	14	12	8	9	8	7	Ret			101	10th	101	8th	175	3rd
2004	D'Antin MotoGP	Ducati Desmosedici GP3	M			RSA	ESP	FRA	ITA	CAT	NED	RIO	GER	GBR	CZE	POR	JPN	QAT	MAL	AUS	VAL								
2004	D'Antin MotoGP	Ducati Desmosedici GP3	M	11	(Spain) Rubén Xaus	Ret	Ret	14	5	6	7	12	11	11	Ret	Ret	9	3	13	11	Ret			77	11th	115	8th	169	3rd
2004	D'Antin MotoGP	Ducati Desmosedici GP3	M	50	(United Kingdom) Neil Hodgson	Ret	Ret	Ret	11	12	10	16	13	10	11	Ret	8	Ret	Ret	18	15			38	17th	115	8th	169	3rd
2005	D'Antin MotoGP – Pramac; Team d'Antin Pramac	Ducati Desmosedici GP4	D			ESP	POR	CHN	FRA	ITA	CAT	NED	USA	GBR	GER	CZE	JPN	MAL	QAT	AUS	TUR	VAL							
2005	D'Antin MotoGP – Pramac; Team d'Antin Pramac	Ducati Desmosedici GP4	D	44	(Italy) Roberto Rolfo	15	13	16	15	17	14	18	Ret	10	14	17	Ret	13	12	13	16	Ret		25	18th	25	10th	202	3rd
2006	Pramac d'Antin MotoGP	Ducati Desmosedici GP5	D			ESP	QAT	TUR	CHN	FRA	ITA	CAT	NED	GBR	GER	USA	CZE	MAL	AUS	JPN	POR	VAL							
2006	Pramac d'Antin MotoGP	Ducati Desmosedici GP5	D	66	(Germany) Alex Hofmann	15	15	16	15	13	Ret	10			Ret	14		15	13	16	11	Ret		23 (30)	17th	33	11th	248	3rd
2006	Pramac d'Antin MotoGP	Ducati Desmosedici GP5	D	30	(Spain) José Luis Cardoso	Ret	16	Ret	17	Ret	17	11	17	15	14	13	Ret	17	17	Ret	14	Ret		10	20th	33	11th	248	3rd
2006	Pramac d'Antin MotoGP	Ducati Desmosedici GP5	D	22	(Spain) Iván Silva								16	Ret			18							0	NC	33	11th	248	3rd
2007	Pramac d'Antin	Ducati Desmosedici GP7	B			QAT	ESP	TUR	CHN	FRA	ITA	CAT	GBR	NED	GER	USA	CZE	SMR	POR	JPN	AUS	MAL	VAL						
2007	Pramac d'Antin	Ducati Desmosedici GP7	B	4	(Brazil) Alex Barros	9	11	4	14	Ret	3	8	7	7	Ret	9	9	Ret	Ret	8	5	12	7	115	10th	181	6th	394	1st
2007	Pramac d'Antin	Ducati Desmosedici GP7	B	66	(Germany) Alex Hofmann	11	DSQ	9	9	5	11	13	9	8	9			11	Ret					65	13th	181	6th	394	1st
2007	Pramac d'Antin	Ducati Desmosedici GP7	B	72	(Japan) Shinichi Ito															15				1	26th	181	6th	394	1st
2007	Pramac d'Antin	Ducati Desmosedici GP7	B	57	(United Kingdom) Chaz Davies											16					Ret	17	DNS	0	NC	181	6th	394	1st
2007	Pramac d'Antin	Ducati Desmosedici GP7	B	22	(Spain) Iván Silva												16							0	NC	181	6th	394	1st
2008	Alice Team	Ducati Desmosedici GP8	B			QAT	ESP	POR	CHN	FRA	ITA	CAT	GBR	NED	GER	USA	CZE	SMR	IND	JPN	AUS	MAL	VAL						
2008	Alice Team	Ducati Desmosedici GP8	B	24	(Spain) Toni Elías	14	15	12	8	11	12	DSQ	11	12	12	7	2	3	12	16	11	15	18	92	12th	159	8th	321	2nd
2008	Alice Team	Ducati Desmosedici GP8	B	50	(France) Sylvain Guintoli	15	16	15	15	13	11	13	13	10	6	12	12	11	7	14	14	13	12	67	13th	159	8th	321	2nd
2009	Pramac Racing	Ducati Desmosedici GP9	B			QAT	JPN	ESP	FRA	ITA	CAT	NED	USA	GER	GBR	CZE	IND	SMR	POR	AUS	MAL	VAL							
2009	Pramac Racing	Ducati Desmosedici GP9	B	36	(Finland) Mika Kallio	8	8	Ret	Ret	13	9	Ret		14	10				Ret	9	10	9		54 (71)	15th	108	8th	272	3rd
2009	Pramac Racing	Ducati Desmosedici GP9	B	88	(Italy) Niccolò Canepa	17	14	16	15	9	16	14	12	12	8	12	Ret	13	13	DNS				38	16th	108	8th	272	3rd
2009	Pramac Racing	Ducati Desmosedici GP9	B	44	(Spain) Aleix Espargaró												13	11			11	13		16	18th	108	8th	272	3rd
2009	Pramac Racing	Ducati Desmosedici GP9	B	84	(Italy) Michel Fabrizio											Ret								0	NC	108	8th	272	3rd

Year	Team	Motorcycle	Tyres	No.	Rider	1	2	3	4	5	6	7	8	9	10	11	12	13	14	15	16	17	18	19	Points	RC	Points	TC	Points	MC
2010	Pramac Racing Team	Ducati Desmosedici GP10	B			QAT	ESP	FRA	ITA	GBR	NED	CAT	GER	USA	CZE	IND	SMR	ARA	JPN	MAL	AUS	POR	VAL							
2010	Pramac Racing Team	Ducati Desmosedici GP10	B	41	(Spain) Aleix Espargaró	Ret	15	9	8	10	10	Ret	Ret	Ret	12	9	11	10	14	Ret	8	Ret	11		65	14th	109	8th	286	3rd
2010	Pramac Racing Team	Ducati Desmosedici GP10	B	36	(Finland) Mika Kallio	Ret	7	13	Ret	13	11	12	Ret	9	Ret	Ret	Ret	14	15	12	11				43	17th	109	8th	286	3rd
2010	Pramac Racing Team	Ducati Desmosedici GP10	B	71	(Spain) Carlos Checa																	Ret	15		1	21st	109	8th	286	3rd
2011	Pramac Racing Team	Ducati Desmosedici GP11	B			QAT	ESP	POR	FRA	CAT	GBR	NED	ITA	GER	USA	CZE	IND	SMR	ARA	JPN	AUS	MAL	VAL							
2011	Pramac Racing Team	Ducati Desmosedici GP11	B	14	(France) Randy de Puniet	Ret	Ret	10	Ret	Ret	12	Ret	14	13	DNS	12	8	14	12	10	6	C	Ret		49	16th	92	6th	180	3rd
2011	Pramac Racing Team	Ducati Desmosedici GP11	B	65	(Italy) Loris Capirossi	Ret	11	12	Ret	9	10	DNS			12	13	Ret	Ret	Ret		9	C	9		43	17th	92	6th	180	3rd
2011	Pramac Racing Team	Ducati Desmosedici GP11	B	50	(France) Sylvain Guintoli									17											0	NC	92	6th	180	3rd
2011	Pramac Racing Team	Ducati Desmosedici GP11	B	6	(Australia) Damian Cudlin															Ret					0	NC	92	6th	180	3rd
2012	Pramac Racing Team	Ducati Desmosedici GP12	B			QAT	ESP	POR	FRA	CAT	GBR	NED	GER	ITA	USA	IND	CZE	SMR	ARA	JPN	MAL	AUS	VAL							
2012	Pramac Racing Team	Ducati Desmosedici GP12	B	8	(Spain) Héctor Barberá	9	10	10	9	11	10	7	9	9				Ret	12	10	7	12	Ret		83	11th	93	8th	192	3rd
2012	Pramac Racing Team	Ducati Desmosedici GP12	B	24	(Spain) Toni Elías										Ret	11	11								10	24th	93	8th	192	3rd
2013	Energy T.I. Pramac Team	Ducati Desmosedici GP13	B			QAT	AME	ESP	FRA	ITA	CAT	NED	GER	USA	IND	CZE	GBR	SMR	ARA	MAL	AUS	JPN	VAL							
2013	Energy T.I. Pramac Team	Ducati Desmosedici GP13	B	29	(Italy) Andrea Iannone	9	10	Ret	11	13	Ret	13	DNS		11	9	11	Ret	10	Ret	8	14	Ret		57	12th	121	8th	155	3rd
2013	Ignite Pramac Racing	Ducati Desmosedici GP13	B	51	(Italy) Michele Pirro				8		10	14	10			12	12	10							36 (56)	13th	121	8th	155	3rd
2013	Ignite Pramac Racing	Ducati Desmosedici GP13	B	68	(Colombia) Yonny Hernández														12	10	13	15	Ret		14 (21)	18th	121	8th	155	3rd
2013	Ignite Pramac Racing	Ducati Desmosedici GP13	B	11	(United States) Ben Spies	10	13			DNS					DNS										9	21st	121	8th	155	3rd
2013	Ignite Pramac Racing	Ducati Desmosedici GP13	B	15	(San Marino) Alex de Angelis									11											5	23rd	121	8th	155	3rd
2014	Pramac Racing		B			QAT	AME	ARG	ESP	FRA	ITA	CAT	NED	GER	IND	CZE	GBR	SMR	ARA	JPN	AUS	MAL	VAL							
2014	Pramac Racing	Ducati Desmosedici GP14	B	29	(Italy) Andrea Iannone	10	7	6	Ret	Ret	7	9	6	5	Ret	5	8	5	Ret	6	Ret	DNS	22		102	10th	155	6th	211	3rd
2014	Energy T.I. Pramac Racing	Ducati Desmosedici GP13	B	68	(Colombia) Yonny Hernández	12	13	12	14	13	10	11	19	17	Ret	Ret	11	10	15	Ret	11	7	Ret		53	15th	155	6th	211	3rd
2015	Pramac Racing; Octo Pramac Racing	Ducati Desmosedici GP14	B			QAT	AME	ARG	ESP	FRA	ITA	CAT	NED	GER	IND	CZE	GBR	SMR	ARA	JPN	AUS	MAL	VAL							
2015	Pramac Racing; Octo Pramac Racing	Ducati Desmosedici GP14	B	9	(Italy) Danilo Petrucci	12	10	11	12	10	9	9	11	9	10	10	2	6	Ret	Ret	12	6	10		113	10th	169	6th	256	3rd
2015	Pramac Racing; Octo Pramac Racing	Ducati Desmosedici GP14	B	68	(Colombia) Yonny Hernández	10	Ret	Ret	10	8	10	Ret	14	12	12	11	Ret	Ret	10	14	17	12	13		56	14th	169	6th	256	3rd
2016	Octo Pramac Yakhnich	Ducati Desmosedici GP15	M			QAT	ARG	AME	ESP	FRA	ITA	CAT	NED	GER	AUT	CZE	GBR	SMR	ARA	JPN	AUS	MAL	VAL							
2016	Octo Pramac Yakhnich	Ducati Desmosedici GP15	M	9	(Italy) Danilo Petrucci	DNS				7	8	9	Ret	Ret	11	7	9	11	17	8	9	10	12		75	14th	161	6th	261	3rd
2016	Octo Pramac Yakhnich	Ducati Desmosedici GP15	M	45	(United Kingdom) Scott Redding	10	Ret	6	19	Ret	Ret	16	3	4	8	15	17	15	19	9	7	15	14		74	15th	161	6th	261	3rd
2016	Octo Pramac Yakhnich	Ducati Desmosedici GP15	M	51	(Italy) Michele Pirro		12	8	16																12 (36)	19th	161	6th	261	3rd
2017	Octo Pramac Racing		M			QAT	ARG	AME	ESP	FRA	ITA	CAT	NED	GER	CZE	AUT	GBR	SMR	ARA	JPN	AUS	MAL	VAL							
2017	Octo Pramac Racing	Ducati Desmosedici GP17	M	9	(Italy) Danilo Petrucci	Ret	7	8	7	Ret	3	Ret	2	12	7	Ret	Ret	2	20	3	21	6	13		124	8th	188	5th	310	3rd
2017	Octo Pramac Racing	Ducati Desmosedici GP16	M	45	(United Kingdom) Scott Redding	7	8	12	11	Ret	12	13	Ret	20	16	12	8	7	14	16	11	13	Ret		64	14th	188	5th	310	3rd
2018	Alma Pramac Racing		M			QAT	ARG	AME	ESP	FRA	ITA	CAT	NED	GER	CZE	AUT	GBR	SMR	ARA	THA	JPN	AUS	MAL	VAL						
2018	Alma Pramac Racing	Ducati Desmosedici GP18	M	9	(Italy) Danilo Petrucci	5	10	12	4	2	7	8	Ret	4	6	5	C	11	7	9	9	12	9	Ret	144	8th	235	5th	335	2nd
2018	Alma Pramac Racing	Ducati Desmosedici GP17	M	43	(Australia) Jack Miller	10	**4**	9	6	4	Ret	Ret	10	14	12	18	C	18	9	10	Ret	7	8	Ret	91	13th	235	5th	335	2nd
2019	Alma Pramac Racing; Pramac Racing		M			QAT	ARG	AME	SPA	FRA	ITA	CAT	NED	GER	CZE	AUT	GBR	RSM	ARA	THA	JPN	AUS	MAL	VAL						
2019	Alma Pramac Racing; Pramac Racing	Ducati Desmosedici GP19	M	43	(Australia) Jack Miller	Ret	4	3	Ret	4	Ret	5	9	6	3	Ret	8	9	3	14	10	3	8	3	165	8th	219	6th	318	3rd
2019	Alma Pramac Racing; Pramac Racing	Ducati Desmosedici GP18	M	63	(Italy) Francesco Bagnaia	Ret	14	9	Ret	Ret	Ret	Ret	14	17	12	7	11	Ret	16	11	13	4	12	DNS	54	15th	219	6th	318	3rd

Year	Team	Motorcycle	Tyres	No.	Rider	1	2	3	4	5	6	7	8	9	10	11	12	13	14	15	16	17	18	19	20	21	22	Points	RC	Points	TC	Points	MC
2020	Pramac Racing	Ducati Desmosedici GP20	M			SPA	ANC	CZE	AUT	STY	RSM	EMI	CAT	FRA	ARA	TER	EUR	VAL	POR														
2020	Pramac Racing	Ducati Desmosedici GP20	M	43	(Australia) Jack Miller	4	Ret	9	3	2	8	Ret	5	Ret	9	Ret	6	2	2									132	7th	183	5th	221	1st
2020	Pramac Racing	Ducati Desmosedici GP20	M	63	(Italy) Francesco Bagnaia	7	Ret	DNS			2	Ret	6	13	Ret	Ret	Ret	11	Ret									47	16th	183	5th	221	1st
2020	Pramac Racing	Ducati Desmosedici GP20	M	51	(Italy) Michele Pirro				12	20																		4	23rd	183	5th	221	1st
2021	Pramac Racing	Ducati Desmosedici GP21	M			QAT	DOH	POR	SPA	FRA	ITA	CAT	GER	NED	STY	AUT	GBR	ARA	RSM	AME	EMI	ALR	VAL										
2021	Pramac Racing	Ducati Desmosedici GP21	M	5	(France) Johann Zarco	2	2	Ret	8	2	4	2	**8**	4	6	Ret	11	17	12	Ret	5	5	6					173	5th	288	4th	357	1st
2021	Pramac Racing	Ducati Desmosedici GP21	M	89	(Spain) Jorge Martín	15	**3**	DNS				14	12	Ret	**1**	**3**	Ret	9	Ret	5	Ret	7	**2**					111	9th	288	4th	357	1st
2021	Pramac Racing	Ducati Desmosedici GP21	M	51	(Italy) Michele Pirro						13																	3 (12)	23rd	288	4th	357	1st
2021	Pramac Racing	Ducati Desmosedici GP21	M	53	(Spain) Tito Rabat				18	15																		1	27th	288	4th	357	1st
2022	Pramac Racing; Prima Pramac Racing	Ducati Desmosedici GP22	M			QAT	INA	ARG	AME	POR	SPA	FRA	ITA	CAT	GER	NED	GBR	AUT	RSM	ARA	JPN	THA	AUS	MAL	VAL								
2022	Pramac Racing; Prima Pramac Racing	Ducati Desmosedici GP22	M	5	(France) Johann Zarco	8	3	Ret	9	**2**	Ret	5	4	3	2	13	**Ret**	5	Ret	8	11	4	8	9	Ret			166	8th	318	4th	448	1st
2022	Pramac Racing; Prima Pramac Racing	Ducati Desmosedici GP22	M	89	(Spain) Jorge Martín	**Ret**	Ret	2	**8**	Ret	22	Ret	13	2	6	7	5	10	9	6	3	9	**7**	**Ret**	**3**			152	9th	318	4th	448	1st
2023	Prima Pramac Racing	Ducati Desmosedici GP23	M			POR	ARG	AME	SPA	FRA	ITA	GER	NED	GBR	AUT	CAT	RSM	IND	JPN	INA	AUS	THA	MAL	QAT	VAL								
2023	Prima Pramac Racing	Ducati Desmosedici GP23	M	89	(Spain) Jorge Martín	Ret^{2}	5^{8}	Ret^{3}	4^{4}	2^{1}	2^{3}	1^{1}	5^{6}	6^{6}	7^{3}	3^{5}	**1**^{1}	2^{1}	**1**^{1}	Ret^{1}	**5**	**1**^{1}	4^{2}	10^{1}	Ret^{1}			428	2nd	653	1st	700	1st
2023	Prima Pramac Racing	Ducati Desmosedici GP23	M	5	(France) Johann Zarco	4^{8}	2	7	Ret^{8}	3^{6}	3^{4}	3^{5}	Ret	9^{4}	13	4^{7}	10	6	NC^{5}	Ret	1	10^{9}	12^{8}	12	2^{9}			225	5th	653	1st	700	1st
2024	Prima Pramac Racing	Ducati Desmosedici GP24	M			QAT	POR	AME	SPA	FRA	CAT	ITA	NED	GER	GBR	AUT	ARA	RSM	EMI	INA	JPN	AUS	THA	MAL	SLD								
2024	Prima Pramac Racing	Ducati Desmosedici GP24	M	89	(Spain) Jorge Martín	**3**^{1}	1^{3}	4^{3}	Ret^{1}	**1**^{1}	2^{4}	**3**	2^{2}	**Ret**^{1}	2^{2}	**2**^{2}	2^{2}	15^{1}	2^{2}	**1**	2^{4}	**2**^{1}	2^{2}	2^{1}	3^{3}			508	1st	681	2nd	722	1st
2024	Prima Pramac Racing	Ducati Desmosedici GP24	M	21	(Italy) Franco Morbidelli	18	18	Ret	Ret^{4}	7	Ret	6^{4}	9^{9}	5^{5}	10	8^{6}	6	Ret^{3}	5^{9}	4^{5}	5^{5}	6^{5}	Ret^{6}	14^{6}	8^{6}			173	9th	681	2nd	722	1st
2025	Prima Pramac Yamaha MotoGP	Yamaha YZR-M1	M			THA	ARG	AME	QAT	SPA	FRA	GBR	ARA	ITA	NED	GER	CZE	AUT	HUN	CAT	RSM	JPN	INA	AUS	MAL	POR	VAL						
2025	Prima Pramac Yamaha MotoGP	Yamaha YZR-M1	M	43	(Australia) Jack Miller	11	13	5	Ret	Ret	Ret	7^{9}	14	Ret	14	8^{5}	10	18	Ret	14	12	Ret	14	Ret^{4}	14	12	9	79	17th	125	11th	247	5th
2025	Prima Pramac Yamaha MotoGP	Yamaha YZR-M1	M	88	(Portugal) Miguel Oliveira	14	DNS				Ret	16	15	13	Ret	Ret	17	17	12	9	9	14	11^{9}	12	19	14	11	43	20th	125	11th	247	5th
2025	Prima Pramac Yamaha MotoGP	Yamaha YZR-M1	M	7	(Spain) Augusto Fernández			13	Ret	16																		3 (8)	25th	125	11th	247	5th
2026	Prima Pramac Yamaha MotoGP	Yamaha YZR-M1	M			THA	BRA	USA	SPA	FRA	CAT	ITA	HUN	CZE	NED	GER	GBR	ARA	RSM	AUT	JPN	INA	AUS	MAL	QAT	POR	VAL						
2026	Prima Pramac Yamaha MotoGP	Yamaha YZR-M1	M	43	(Australia) Jack Miller	18	Ret	16	18	15	15	15	8	16	12	12	12	11	Ret	21	19	Ret	C^{7}	16	DNA (Note: Yamaha did not attend the Qatar Grand Prix due to 'existing company-wide travel restrictions' citing potential dangers of the ongoing Iran war.)			31*	19th*	49*	11th*	105*	5th*
2026	Prima Pramac Yamaha MotoGP	Yamaha YZR-M1	M	7	(Turkey) Toprak Razgatlıoğlu	17	17	15	19	13	16	16	11	14	Ret	15	14	Ret	12	20	17	Ret			DNA			18*	22nd*	49*	11th*	105*	5th*
2026	Prima Pramac Yamaha MotoGP	Yamaha YZR-M1	M	47	(Spain) Augusto Fernández																		C	Ret				0 (6)*	24th*	49*	11th*	105*	5th*

* Season still in progress.
