= Remy Gardner =

Australian motorcycle racer

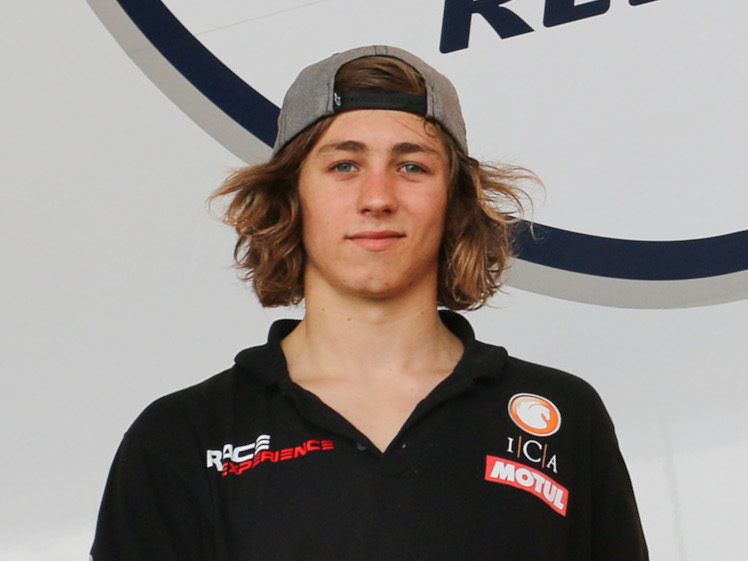
- Gardner in 2016
- Nationality: Australian
- Born: 24 February 1998 (age 28); Sydney, Australia
- Current team: GYTR GRT Yamaha WorldSBK Team
- Bike number: 87
Motorcycle racing career statistics
MotoGP World Championship
Active years	2022, 2024
Manufacturers	KTM (2022); Yamaha (2024)
Championships	0
2024 championship position	26th (0 pts)
Starts / Wins / Podiums / Poles / F. laps / Points; 22 / 0 / 0 / 0 / 0 / 13
Moto2 World Championship
Active years	2016–2021
Manufacturers	Kalex (2016, 2019–2021); Tech3 (2017–2018)
Championships	1 (2021)
2021 championship position	1st (311 pts)
Starts / Wins / Podiums / Poles / F. laps / Points; 93 / 6 / 17 / 6 / 5 / 594
Moto3 World Championship
Active years	2014–2015
Manufacturers	Kalex KTM (2014); KTM (2014); Mahindra (2015)
Championships	0
2015 championship position	30th (6 pts)
Starts / Wins / Podiums / Poles / F. laps / Points; 21 / 0 / 0 / 0 / 0 / 7
Superbike World Championship
Active years	2023–
Manufacturers	Yamaha
Championships	0
2025 championship position	11th (126 pts)
Starts / Wins / Podiums / Poles / F. laps / Points; 102 / 0 / 2 / 0 / 1 / 425

Remy Christopher Gardner (born 24 February 1998) is an Australian motorcycle racer, best known for winning the 2021 Moto2 World Championship with Red Bull KTM Ajo. He is the son of 1987 premier class world champion, Wayne Gardner.

== Career ==
=== Moto3 World Championship ===
Gardner made his first three appearances in the Moto3 World Championship in 2014, twice as replacement for injured riders and once as a wild card entry, scoring one point in Malaysia.

In 2015, Gardner was signed as a full-time rider for the Mahindra-equipped CIP team, riding next to Tatsuki Suzuki. Gardner achieved his best result, his only point scoring finish of the year, in his home GP at Phillip Island with a 10th place finish.

=== Moto2 World Championship ===
==== Tasca Racing Scuderia Moto2 (2016) ====
For 2016, Gardner was due to compete in the Moto2 class with AGP Racing aboard a Suter alongside Federico Fuligni, but the team withdrew from the championship. He started the season in the Moto2 European Championship, winning a race in Barcelona, and mid-season made his debut in the Moto2 World Championship in Catalunya aboard Tasca Racing's Kalex as the substitute for Alessandro Tonucci. Gardner scored his first point in the class in his first race, and was kept for the remainder of the season, as Tonucci had no points in six races. Gardner scored points in three races, collecting eight points in the season, and earning himself a full time ride for 2017.

==== Tech3 Racing (2017–2018) ====
For 2017, Gardner switched to Tech 3 Racing, partnering Spaniard Xavi Vierge. Gardner crashed out on the first lap in both of the opening two rounds in Qatar and Argentina, and was ruled out of the following round in Austin, being replaced by Julián Simón. Gardner would come back and improve steadily throughout the season however, picking up his first points of the season in Mugello with a 14th-place finish, and he also picked up points at the Sachsenring, Brno, the Red Bull Ring, Misano, Motegi, and Phillip Island. He finished in 21st place in the riders' championship, scoring 23 points.

In 2018, Gardner remained with Tech 3, this time joined by Bo Bendsneyder, who moved up from Moto3. In the first half the season, Gardner suffered two broken legs and an ankle in a training accident and was replaced by Héctor Garzó for the rounds in Jerez, Le Mans, and Mugello. At Silverstone, Gardner achieved his first front row start in the Moto2 class, however due to heavy rain on race day, all races that weekend were cancelled due to unsafe track conditions after resurfacing. At Valencia, the last race of the season, Gardner scored his best ever result in the Moto2 class with a fifth place finish, and he finished 19th in the riders' championship, scoring 40 points.

==== Onexox TKKR SAG Team (2019–2020) ====
For 2019, Tech 3 decided to replace Gardner and Bendsneyder with Marco Bezzecchi and Philipp Öttl. In October 2018, it was announced that Gardner would join SAG Team, joining Tetsuta Nagashima. Gardner started the season really well, finishing fourth in the opening round at Qatar, and scoring his first podium in Moto2 with a second place finish in Argentina the next race weekend. Gardner finished the season 15th in the standings with 77 points, once again improving his tally from previous years, and just one point back from teammate Nagashima.

In the 2020 Moto2 World Championship, Gardner would be paired by Kasma Daniel, after Nagashima left to join Red Bull KTM Ajo. Gardner once again steadily improved, collecting 135 points total, finishing third in Austria, second in France, and third in Valencia, before winning the last race of the season in Portugal, his first victory in the Moto2 category. His teammate Daniel scored no points during the season, and Gardner finished 44 points ahead of ex-teammate Nagashima, who he would eventually replace at the Red Bull KTM Ajo team for 2021.

==== Red Bull KTM Ajo (2021) ====
Following Jorge Martín's graduation to MotoGP, and Tetsuta Nagashima's disappointing season, for the 2021 Moto2 World Championship, Red Bull KTM Ajo Motorsport signed Gardner, and Raúl Fernández. The pair dominated the season, winning 13 out of the 18 races held that year. Gardner scored five race wins, six second places, and a third place, never finishing outside the top-ten during the season, besides a crash in the USA. The championship came down to the last race in Valencia, but a tenth place finish saw Gardner crowned world champion, winning the title with 311 points, four points over teammate Fernández.

=== MotoGP World Championship ===
==== Tech3 KTM Factory Racing (2022) ====
In September 2021, it was announced that both Gardner and Raúl Fernández would step up to the premier class for the 2022 MotoGP World Championship, riding for the KTM Tech3 team.

In September 2022, Gardner announced that he would be sacked from KTM at the end of the season, as he was told that he was "not professional enough", despite being ahead of teammate Fernández in the standings during that time.

==== Monster Energy Yamaha MotoGP Team (2024) ====
Gardner made a comeback with Yamaha as replacement to injured Álex Rins. Gardner raced the German and British Grands Prix and later in the season as a wildcard at the Japanese Grand Prix but failed to finish in the points in any of the three races.

=== Superbike World Championship ===
==== GRT Yamaha WorldSBK Team (from 2023) ====
After Gardner was unable to find a seat for the 2023 MotoGP World Championship, he joined Yamaha for the 2023 Superbike World Championship.

== Career statistics ==
=== FIM CEV Moto3 Junior World Championship ===
==== Races by year ====
(key) (Races in bold indicate pole position, races in italics indicate fastest lap)

Year	Bike	1	2	3	4	5	6	7	8	9	10	11	Pos	Pts
2012	Moriwaki Honda	JER; Ret	NAV; 15	ARA	CAT; Ret	ALB1; 13	ALB2; 14	VAL; 19					26th	6
2013	KTM	CAT1; Ret	CAT2; 20	ARA; Ret	ALB1	ALB2; 5	NAV; 7	VAL1; 11	VAL2; Ret	JER; 24			16th	25
2014	KTM	JER1; 12	JER2; 11	LMS; 14	ARA; 17	CAT1; 10	CAT2; 14	ALB; 3	NAV; DNS	ALG; 4	VAL1; 7	VAL2; 11	9th	62

=== FIM CEV Moto2 European Championship ===
==== Races by year ====
(key) (Races in bold indicate pole position, races in italics indicate fastest lap)

Year	Bike	1	2	3	4	5	6	7	8	9	10	11	Pos	Pts
2016	Kalex	VAL1; Ret	VAL2; 13	ARA1; Ret	ARA2; 5	CAT1; Ret	CAT2; 1	ALB	ALG1	ALG2	JER	VAL	16th	39

=== Grand Prix motorcycle racing ===
==== By season ====
Season	Class	Motorcycle	Team	Race	Win	Podium	Pole	FLap	Pts	Plcd
2014	Moto3	Kalex KTM	Kiefer Racing	1	0	0	0	0	0	32nd
2014	Moto3	KTM	Team Laglisse Calvo	2	0	0	0	0	1	32nd
2015	Moto3	Mahindra	CIP	18	0	0	0	0	6	30th
2016	Moto2	Kalex	Tasca Racing Scuderia Moto2	12	0	0	0	0	8	26th
2017	Moto2	Tech3	Tech3 Racing	17	0	0	0	0	23	21st
2018	Moto2	Tech3	Tech3 Racing	15	0	0	0	0	40	19th
2019	Moto2	Kalex	ONEXOX TKKR SAG Team	18	0	1	1	1	77	15th
2020	Moto2	Kalex	ONEXOX TKKR SAG Team	13	1	4	2	1	135	6th
2021	Moto2	Kalex	Red Bull KTM Ajo	18	5	12	3	3	311	**1st**
2022	MotoGP	KTM	Tech3 KTM Factory Racing	20	0	0	0	0	13	23rd
2024	MotoGP	Yamaha	Monster Energy Yamaha MotoGP Team	3	0	0	0	0	0	26th
Total				**137**	**6**	**17**	**6**	**5**	**614**	

==== By class ====
Class	Seasons	1st GP	1st pod	1st win	Race	Win	Podiums	Pole	FLap	Pts	WChmp
Moto3	2014–2015	2014 San Marino			21	0	0	0	0	7	0
Moto2	2016–2021	2016 Catalunya	2019 Argentina	2020 Portugal	93	6	17	6	5	594	1
MotoGP	2022, 2024	2022 Qatar			23	0	0	0	0	13	0
Total	2014–2022, 2024				**137**	**6**	**17**	**6**	**5**	**614**	**0**

==== Races by year ====
(key) (Races in bold indicate pole position, races in italics indicate fastest lap)

Year	Class	Bike	1	2	3	4	5	6	7	8	9	10	11	12	13	14	15	16	17	18	19	20	Pos	Pts
2014	Moto3	Kalex KTM	QAT	AME	ARG	SPA	FRA	ITA	CAT	NED	GER	INP	CZE	GBR	RSM; 27	ARA	JPN						32nd	1
2014	Moto3	KTM																AUS; 26	MAL; 15	VAL			32nd	1
2015	Moto3	Mahindra	QAT; Ret	AME; 18	ARG; 19	SPA; 25	FRA; Ret	ITA; 23	CAT; 25	NED; 26	GER; 23	INP; 17	CZE; 17	GBR; 17	RSM; Ret	ARA; 19	JPN; Ret	AUS; 10	MAL; 22	VAL; Ret			30th	6
2016	Moto2	Kalex	QAT	ARG	AME	SPA	FRA	ITA	CAT; 15	NED; 20	GER; 12	AUT; 19	CZE; 21	GBR; 20	RSM; 19	ARA; 19	JPN; 19	AUS; Ret	MAL; 13	VAL; 18			26th	8
2017	Moto2	Tech3	QAT; Ret	ARG; Ret	AME	SPA; 22	FRA; 20	ITA; 14	CAT; 19	NED; 16	GER; 12	CZE; 9	AUT; 15	GBR; 20	RSM; 12	ARA; 20	JPN; 12	AUS; 15	MAL; Ret	VAL; 22			21st	23
2018	Moto2	Tech3	QAT; 12	ARG; 6	AME; 17	SPA	FRA	ITA	CAT; 15	NED; 18	GER; 11	CZE; Ret	AUT; Ret	GBR; C	RSM; 12	ARA; 19	THA; 12	JPN; 15	AUS; Ret	MAL; Ret	VAL; 5		19th	40
2019	Moto2	Kalex	QAT; 4	ARG; 2	AME; 11	SPA; DNS	FRA; Ret	ITA; 13	CAT; Ret	**NED**; Ret	GER; 13	CZE; 16	AUT; Ret	GBR; 4	RSM; Ret	ARA; 13	THA; 12	JPN; Ret	AUS; 6	MAL; 14	VAL; 15		15th	77
2020	Moto2	Kalex	QAT; 5	SPA; 7	ANC; 14	CZE; 13	**AUT**; Ret	STY; 3	RSM; DNS	EMI	CAT; 16	FRA; 2	ARA; 5	TER; 4	EUR; 3	VAL; 7	**POR**; 1						6th	135
2021	Moto2	Kalex	QAT; 2	DOH; 2	POR; 3	**SPA**; 4	FRA; 2	ITA; 1	**CAT**; 1	GER; 1	NED; 2	**STY**; 4	AUT; 7	GBR; 1	ARA; 2	RSM; 2	AME; Ret	EMI; 7	ALR; 1	VAL; 10			1st	311
2022	MotoGP	KTM	QAT; 15	INA; 21	ARG; 17	AME; 20	POR; 14	SPA; 20	FRA; Ret	ITA; 19	CAT; 11	GER; 15	NED; 19	GBR; 18	AUT; 20	RSM; 19	ARA; 16	JPN; 19	THA; Ret	AUS; 15	MAL; 18	VAL; 13	23rd	13
2024	MotoGP	Yamaha	QAT	POR	AME	SPA	FRA	CAT	ITA	NED	GER; 19	GBR; 18	AUT	ARA	RSM	EMI	INA	JPN; 17	AUS	THA	MAL	SLD	26th	0

=== Superbike World Championship ===
==== By season ====
Season	Motorcycle	Team	Race	Win	Podium	Pole	FLap	Pts	Plcd
2023	Yamaha YZF-R1	GYTR GRT Yamaha WorldSBK Team	35	0	0	0	0	156	9th
2024	Yamaha YZF-R1	GYTR GRT Yamaha WorldSBK Team	31	0	1	0	1	140	10th
2025	Yamaha YZF-R1	GYTR GRT Yamaha WorldSBK Team	33	0	1	0	0	126	11th
2026	Yamaha YZF-R1	GYTR GRT Yamaha WorldSBK Team	3	0	0	0	0	3*	16th*
Total			**102**	**0**	**2**	**0**	**1**	**425**	

==== Races by year ====
(key) (Races in bold indicate pole position) (Races in italics indicate fastest lap)

Year	Bike	1			2			3			4			5			6			7			8			9			10			11			12			Pos	Pts
Year	Bike	R1	SR	R2	R1	SR	R2	R1	SR	R2	R1	SR	R2	R1	SR	R2	R1	SR	R2	R1	SR	R2	R1	SR	R2	R1	SR	R2	R1	SR	R2	R1	SR	R2	R1	SR	R2	Pos	Pts
2023	Yamaha	AUS; 12	AUS; Ret	AUS; 10	INA; DNS	INA; 14	INA; 7	NED; 8	NED; 12	NED; 6	SPA; 10	SPA; Ret	SPA; 13	ITA; 9	ITA; Ret	ITA; 10	GBR; 10	GBR; 15	GBR; 12	ITA; 11	ITA; 11	ITA; 11	CZE; 11	CZE; 6	CZE; 6	FRA; 15	FRA; 11	FRA; 8	SPA; 7	SPA; 10	SPA; 9	POR; 6	POR; 4	POR; Ret	SPA; Ret	SPA; 6	SPA; 4	9th	156
2024	Yamaha	AUS; Ret	AUS; 6	AUS; 12	SPA; 15	SPA; 9	SPA; 7	NED; 4	NED; 4	NED; 3	ITA; 6	ITA; Ret	ITA; 8	GBR; 10	GBR; 13	GBR; 11	CZE; 5	CZE; 5	CZE; 4	POR; 10	POR; 15	POR; 12	FRA; Ret	FRA; 9	FRA; 6	ITA; 10	ITA; Ret	ITA; Ret	SPA; 16	SPA; 13	SPA; 15	POR; Ret	POR; DNS	POR; DNS	SPA	SPA	SPA	10th	140
2025	Yamaha	AUS; Ret	AUS; 13	AUS; Ret	POR; 10	POR; 10	POR; Ret	NED; 8	NED; 7	NED; 3	ITA; 6	ITA; 10	ITA; 10	CZE; Ret	CZE; 15	CZE; 5	EMI; Ret	EMI; 8	EMI; Ret	GBR; 9	GBR; 12	GBR; 9	HUN; DNS	HUN; DNS	HUN; DNS	FRA; 6	FRA; 11	FRA; 13	ARA; Ret	ARA; 16	ARA; 12	POR; 9	POR; 6	POR; 7	SPA; 8	SPA; Ret	SPA; 11	11th	126
2026	Yamaha	AUS; Ret	AUS; 16	AUS; 13	POR; 13	POR; 16	POR; 10	NED	NED	NED	HUN	HUN	HUN	CZE	CZE	CZE	ARA	ARA	ARA	EMI	EMI	EMI	GBR	GBR	GBR	FRA	FRA	FRA	ITA	ITA	ITA	POR	POR	POR	SPA	SPA	SPA	16th*	3*

* Season still in progress.
