= 2015 British motorcycle Grand Prix =

(United Kingdom) 2015 British Grand Prix
Race details
- Race 12 of 18 races in the 2015 Grand Prix motorcycle racing season
- Date: 30 August 2015
- Official name: Octo British Grand Prix
- Location: Silverstone Circuit
- Course: Permanent racing facility; 5.900 km (3.666 mi)

MotoGP
Pole position
Rider	(Spain) Marc Márquez	Honda
Time	2:00.234	
Fastest lap
Rider	(Italy) Valentino Rossi	Yamaha
Time	2:16.486 on lap 9	
Podium
First	(Italy) Valentino Rossi	Yamaha
Second	(Italy) Danilo Petrucci	Ducati
Third	(Italy) Andrea Dovizioso	Ducati

Moto2
Pole position
Rider	(United Kingdom) Sam Lowes	Speed Up
Time	2:06.345	
Fastest lap
Rider	(Germany) Florian Alt	Suter
Time	2:13.742 on lap 18	
Podium
First	(France) Johann Zarco	Kalex
Second	(Spain) Álex Rins	Kalex
Third	(Spain) Tito Rabat	Kalex

Moto3
Pole position
Rider	(Spain) Jorge Navarro	Honda
Time	2:12.440	
Fastest lap
Rider	(United Kingdom) Danny Kent	Honda
Time	2:33.508 on lap 3	
Podium
First	(United Kingdom) Danny Kent	Honda
Second	(Czech Republic) Jakub Kornfeil	KTM
Third	(Italy) Niccolò Antonelli	Honda

The 2015 British motorcycle Grand Prix was the twelfth round of the 2015 Grand Prix motorcycle racing season. It was held at the Silverstone Circuit in Silverstone on 30 August 2015. The MotoGP and Moto3 races were held in wet conditions, while the Moto2 race was in dry conditions with cloudy weather.

In the premier class, Marc Márquez took his sixth pole position of the season and recorded the fastest lap by a motorcycle since Silverstone was renovated, with a 2:00.234 lap time. In the race, he battled with Valentino Rossi for first place, but he crashed out of the race with 8 laps remaining. Rossi led home an all-Italian podium for his fourth victory of the season, and his first at Silverstone. Danilo Petrucci finished in second place and recorded his first MotoGP podium, while Andrea Dovizioso finished in third place. Jorge Lorenzo and Dani Pedrosa had good starting positions, but they dropped back into 4th and 5th places respectively. Both LCR Honda riders failed to complete the race; after Jack Miller collided with his teammate Cal Crutchlow, who later retired from the race after a second crash. Yonny Hernández crashed out of the race at Turn 1 of the first lap, while Stefan Bradl and Pol Espargaró also crashed out of the race before the halfway mark. Rossi extended his lead in the championship standings to 12 points from his teammate, Lorenzo.

In the smaller classes, championship leaders Johann Zarco (Moto2) and Danny Kent (Moto3) won their respective races, to extend their championship leads.

== Classification ==
=== MotoGP ===
The race start was delayed due to weather conditions, and ultimately started at 13:25 local time.

Pos.	No.	Rider	Team	Manufacturer	Laps	Time/Retired	Grid	Points
1	46	(Italy) Valentino Rossi	Movistar Yamaha MotoGP	Yamaha	20	46:15.617	4	25
2	9	(Italy) Danilo Petrucci	Octo Pramac Racing	Ducati	20	+3.010	18	20
3	4	(Italy) Andrea Dovizioso	Ducati Team	Ducati	20	+4.117	12	16
4	99	(Spain) Jorge Lorenzo	Movistar Yamaha MotoGP	Yamaha	20	+5.726	2	13
5	26	(Spain) Dani Pedrosa	Repsol Honda Team	Honda	20	+11.132	3	11
6	45	(United Kingdom) Scott Redding	EG 0,0 Marc VDS	Honda	20	+25.467	7	10
7	38	(United Kingdom) Bradley Smith	Monster Yamaha Tech 3	Yamaha	20	+26.717	6	9
8	29	(Italy) Andrea Iannone	Ducati Team	Ducati	20	+29.393	9	8
9	41	(Spain) Aleix Espargaró	Team Suzuki Ecstar	Suzuki	20	+38.815	10	7
10	19	(Spain) Álvaro Bautista	Aprilia Racing Team Gresini	Aprilia	20	+41.712	20	6
11	25	(Spain) Maverick Viñales	Team Suzuki Ecstar	Suzuki	20	+44.776	13	5
12	69	(United States) Nicky Hayden	Aspar MotoGP Team	Honda	20	+52.489	21	4
13	8	(Spain) Héctor Barberá	Avintia Racing	Ducati	20	+1:11.211	17	3
14	63	(France) Mike Di Meglio	Avintia Racing	Ducati	20	+1:15.292	22	2
15	15	(San Marino) Alex de Angelis	E-Motion IodaRacing Team	ART	20	+1:17.863	25	1
16	76	(France) Loris Baz	Forward Racing	Yamaha Forward	20	+1:19.310	15	
17	50	(Republic of Ireland) Eugene Laverty	Aspar MotoGP Team	Honda	20	+1:19.735	19	
18	71	(Italy) Claudio Corti	Forward Racing	Yamaha Forward	20	+1:58.086	23	
19	17	(Czech Republic) Karel Abraham	AB Motoracing	Honda	19	+1 lap	24	
Ret	44	(Spain) Pol Espargaró	Monster Yamaha Tech 3	Yamaha	14	Accident	5	
Ret	93	(Spain) Marc Márquez	Repsol Honda Team	Honda	12	Accident	1	
Ret	6	(Germany) Stefan Bradl	Aprilia Racing Team Gresini	Aprilia	12	Accident	14	
Ret	35	(United Kingdom) Cal Crutchlow	LCR Honda	Honda	4	Accident Damage	8	
Ret	43	(Australia) Jack Miller	LCR Honda	Honda	2	Collision	16	
Ret	68	(Colombia) Yonny Hernández	Octo Pramac Racing	Ducati	0	Accident	11	

=== Moto2 ===
Pos.	No.	Rider	Manufacturer	Laps	Time/Retired	Grid	Points
1	5	(France) Johann Zarco	Kalex	18	42:53.674	3	25
2	40	(Spain) Álex Rins	Kalex	18	+3.360	2	20
3	1	(Spain) Tito Rabat	Kalex	18	+5.527	4	16
4	73	(Spain) Álex Márquez	Kalex	18	+6.489	9	13
5	94	(Germany) Jonas Folger	Kalex	18	+8.228	7	11
6	22	(United Kingdom) Sam Lowes	Speed Up	18	+28.261	1	10
7	95	(Australia) Anthony West	Speed Up	18	+33.902	22	9
8	11	(Germany) Sandro Cortese	Kalex	18	+33.939	10	8
9	12	(Switzerland) Thomas Lüthi	Kalex	18	+34.889	5	7
10	88	(Spain) Ricard Cardús	Suter	18	+35.084	23	6
11	23	(Germany) Marcel Schrötter	Tech 3	18	+38.814	18	5
12	4	(Switzerland) Randy Krummenacher	Kalex	18	+39.190	14	4
13	77	(Switzerland) Dominique Aegerter	Kalex	18	+47.780	11	3
14	30	(Japan) Takaaki Nakagami	Kalex	18	+57.103	6	2
15	49	(Spain) Axel Pons	Kalex	18	+1:00.071	13	1
16	55	(Malaysia) Hafizh Syahrin	Kalex	18	+1:02.268	12	
17	39	(Spain) Luis Salom	Kalex	18	+1:04.389	17	
18	60	(Spain) Julián Simón	Speed Up	18	+1:04.806	16	
19	25	(Malaysia) Azlan Shah	Kalex	18	+1:07.910	20	
20	36	(Finland) Mika Kallio	Kalex	18	+1:08.594	19	
21	2	(Switzerland) Jesko Raffin	Kalex	18	+1:10.950	25	
22	97	(Spain) Xavi Vierge	Tech 3	18	+1:11.354	24	
23	70	(Switzerland) Robin Mulhauser	Kalex	18	+1:39.471	28	
24	66	(Germany) Florian Alt	Suter	18	+1:51.325	29	
25	19	(Belgium) Xavier Siméon	Kalex	17	+1 lap	21	
26	64	(Italy) Federico Caricasulo	Kalex	17	+1 lap	30	
27	96	(France) Louis Rossi	Tech 3	16	+2 laps	26	
Ret	10	(Thailand) Thitipong Warokorn	Kalex	16	Accident	27	
Ret	7	(Italy) Lorenzo Baldassarri	Kalex	13	Accident Damage	8	
Ret	3	(Italy) Simone Corsi	Kalex	13	Accident Damage	15	
Ret	28	(United Kingdom) Bradley Ray	FTR	2	Accident	31	
OFFICIAL MOTO2 REPORT

=== Moto3 ===
Pos.	No.	Rider	Manufacturer	Laps	Time/Retired	Grid	Points
1	52	(United Kingdom) Danny Kent	Honda	17	44:13.623	3	25
2	84	(Czech Republic) Jakub Kornfeil	KTM	17	+8.492	13	20
3	23	(Italy) Niccolò Antonelli	Honda	17	+13.189	18	16
4	20	(France) Fabio Quartararo	Honda	17	+50.018	11	13
5	11	(Belgium) Livio Loi	Honda	17	+51.755	28	11
6	17	(United Kingdom) John McPhee	Honda	17	+53.726	12	10
7	58	(Spain) Juan Francisco Guevara	Mahindra	17	+1:01.086	19	9
8	48	(Italy) Lorenzo Dalla Porta	Husqvarna	17	+1:06.158	27	8
9	7	(Spain) Efrén Vázquez	Honda	17	+1:08.634	4	7
10	24	(Japan) Tatsuki Suzuki	Mahindra	17	+1:13.589	33	6
11	10	(France) Alexis Masbou	Honda	17	+1:18.961	6	5
12	5	(Italy) Romano Fenati	KTM	17	+1:27.462	8	4
13	44	(Portugal) Miguel Oliveira	KTM	17	+1:31.210	9	3
14	63	(Malaysia) Zulfahmi Khairuddin	KTM	17	+1:37.523	29	2
15	16	(Italy) Andrea Migno	KTM	17	+1:38.004	17	1
16	65	(Germany) Philipp Öttl	KTM	17	+1:40.376	24	
17	2	(Australia) Remy Gardner	Mahindra	17	+1:50.488	22	
18	26	(United Kingdom) Luke Hedger	Kalex KTM	17	+2:30.582	36	
19	66	(United Kingdom) Taz Taylor	KTM	16	+1 lap	35	
20	76	(Japan) Hiroki Ono	Honda	16	+1 lap	31	
Ret	21	(Italy) Francesco Bagnaia	Mahindra	15	Accident	15	
Ret	33	(Italy) Enea Bastianini	Honda	15	Accident	7	
Ret	29	(Italy) Stefano Manzi	Mahindra	15	Accident	26	
Ret	55	(Italy) Andrea Locatelli	Honda	14	Accident	20	
Ret	40	(South Africa) Darryn Binder	Mahindra	14	Accident Damage	25	
Ret	19	(Italy) Alessandro Tonucci	Mahindra	12	Accident	30	
Ret	88	(Spain) Jorge Martín	Mahindra	10	Accident	16	
Ret	95	(France) Jules Danilo	Honda	8	Accident	23	
Ret	41	(South Africa) Brad Binder	KTM	8	Accident	10	
Ret	98	(Czech Republic) Karel Hanika	KTM	6	Accident	2	
Ret	32	(Spain) Isaac Viñales	KTM	6	Accident Damage	5	
Ret	6	(Spain) María Herrera	Husqvarna	6	Brakes	14	
Ret	22	(Spain) Ana Carrasco	KTM	6	Accident	34	
Ret	12	(Italy) Matteo Ferrari	Mahindra	1	Brakes	32	
Ret	9	(Spain) Jorge Navarro	Honda	0	Accident	1	
Ret	91	(Argentina) Gabriel Rodrigo	KTM	0	Accident	21	
OFFICIAL MOTO3 REPORT

== Championship standings after the race (MotoGP) ==
Below are the standings for the top five riders and constructors after round twelve has concluded.

Riders' Championship standings

Pos.	Rider	Points
1	(Italy) Valentino Rossi	236
2	(Spain) Jorge Lorenzo	224
3	(Spain) Marc Márquez	159
4	(Italy) Andrea Iannone	150
5	(Italy) Andrea Dovizioso	120

Constructors' Championship standings

Pos.	Constructor	Points
1	(Japan) Yamaha	277
2	(Japan) Honda	215
3	(Italy) Ducati	187
4	(Japan) Suzuki	89
5	(Italy) Aprilia	22

Teams' Championship standings

Pos.	Team	Points
1	(Japan) Movistar Yamaha MotoGP	460
2	(Italy) Ducati Team	270
3	(Japan) Repsol Honda Team	266
4	(France) Monster Yamaha Tech 3	196
5	(Japan) Team Suzuki Ecstar	127

- Note: Only the top five positions are included for all standings.

Previous race: 2015 Czech Republic Grand Prix	FIM Grand Prix World Championship; 2015 season	Next race: 2015 San Marino Grand Prix
Previous race: 2014 British Grand Prix	British motorcycle Grand Prix	Next race: 2016 British Grand Prix
