= 2018 San Marino and Rimini Riviera motorcycle Grand Prix =

Thirteenth round of the 2018 MotoGP season

2018 San Marino and Rimini Riviera Grand Prix
Race details
- Race 13 of 19 races in the 2018 Grand Prix motorcycle racing season
- Date: 9 September 2018
- Official name: Gran Premio Octo di San Marino e della Riviera di Rimini
- Location: Misano World Circuit Marco Simoncelli, Misano Adriatico, Italy
- Course: Permanent racing facility; 4.226 km (2.626 mi)

MotoGP
Pole position
Rider	(Spain) Jorge Lorenzo	Ducati
Time	1:31.629	
Fastest lap
Rider	(Italy) Andrea Dovizioso	Ducati
Time	1:32.678 on lap 9	
Podium
First	(Italy) Andrea Dovizioso	Ducati
Second	(Spain) Marc Márquez	Honda
Third	(United Kingdom) Cal Crutchlow	Honda

Moto2
Pole position
Rider	(Italy) Francesco Bagnaia	Kalex
Time	1:37.121	
Fastest lap
Rider	(Italy) Mattia Pasini	Kalex
Time	1:37.860 on lap 3	
Podium
First	(Italy) Francesco Bagnaia	Kalex
Second	(Portugal) Miguel Oliveira	KTM
Third	(Germany) Marcel Schrötter	Kalex

Moto3
Pole position
Rider	(Spain) Jorge Martín	Honda
Time	1:41.823	
Fastest lap
Rider	(Argentina) Gabriel Rodrigo	KTM
Time	1:42.381 on lap 5	
Podium
First	(Italy) Lorenzo Dalla Porta	Honda
Second	(Spain) Jorge Martín	Honda
Third	(Italy) Fabio Di Giannantonio	Honda

The 2018 San Marino and Rimini Riviera motorcycle Grand Prix was the thirteenth round of the 2018 MotoGP season. It was held at the Misano World Circuit Marco Simoncelli in Misano Adriatico on 9 September 2018.

== Classification ==
=== MotoGP ===
Pos.	No.	Rider	Team	Manufacturer	Laps	Time/Retired	Grid	Points
1	4	(Italy) Andrea Dovizioso	Ducati Team	Ducati	27	42:05.426	4	25
2	93	(Spain) Marc Márquez	Repsol Honda Team	Honda	27	+2.822	5	20
3	35	(United Kingdom) Cal Crutchlow	LCR Honda Castrol	Honda	27	+7.269	6	16
4	42	(Spain) Álex Rins	Team Suzuki Ecstar	Suzuki	27	+14.687	10	13
5	25	(Spain) Maverick Viñales	Movistar Yamaha MotoGP	Yamaha	27	+16.016	3	11
6	26	(Spain) Dani Pedrosa	Repsol Honda Team	Honda	27	+17.408	11	10
7	46	(Italy) Valentino Rossi	Movistar Yamaha MotoGP	Yamaha	27	+19.086	7	9
8	29	(Italy) Andrea Iannone	Team Suzuki Ecstar	Suzuki	27	+21.804	13	8
9	19	(Spain) Álvaro Bautista	Ángel Nieto Team	Ducati	27	+23.919	15	7
10	5	(France) Johann Zarco	Monster Yamaha Tech 3	Yamaha	27	+27.559	9	6
11	9	(Italy) Danilo Petrucci	Alma Pramac Racing	Ducati	27	+30.698 (Note: 1.1-second penalty.)	8	5
12	21	(Italy) Franco Morbidelli	EG 0,0 Marc VDS	Honda	27	+32.941	12	4
13	30	(Japan) Takaaki Nakagami	LCR Honda Idemitsu	Honda	27	+33.461	19	3
14	41	(Spain) Aleix Espargaró	Aprilia Racing Team Gresini	Aprilia	27	+35.686	16	2
15	51	(Italy) Michele Pirro	Ducati Team	Ducati	27	+35.812	14	1
16	38	(United Kingdom) Bradley Smith	Red Bull KTM Factory Racing	KTM	27	+46.500	17	
17	99	(Spain) Jorge Lorenzo	Ducati Team	Ducati	27	+46.614	1	
18	43	(Australia) Jack Miller	Alma Pramac Racing	Ducati	27	+50.593	2	
19	55	(Malaysia) Hafizh Syahrin	Monster Yamaha Tech 3	Yamaha	27	+55.168	25	
20	17	(Czech Republic) Karel Abraham	Ángel Nieto Team	Ducati	27	+1:02.255	24	
21	45	(United Kingdom) Scott Redding	Aprilia Racing Team Gresini	Aprilia	27	+1:09.475	21	
22	12	(Switzerland) Thomas Lüthi	EG 0,0 Marc VDS	Honda	27	+1:12.608	23	
23	23	(France) Christophe Ponsson	Reale Avintia Racing	Ducati	26	+1 lap	26	
Ret	6	(Germany) Stefan Bradl	HRC Honda Team	Honda	17	Accident	18	
Ret	44	(Spain) Pol Espargaró	Red Bull KTM Factory Racing	KTM	17	Withdrew	20	
Ret	10	(Belgium) Xavier Siméon	Reale Avintia Racing	Ducati	2	Accident Damage	22	

=== Moto2 ===
Pos.	No.	Rider	Manufacturer	Laps	Time/Retired	Grid	Points
1	42	(Italy) Francesco Bagnaia	Kalex	25	41:02.106	1	25
2	44	(Portugal) Miguel Oliveira	KTM	25	+3.108	9	20
3	23	(Germany) Marcel Schrötter	Kalex	25	+4.094	2	16
4	54	(Italy) Mattia Pasini	Kalex	25	+6.320	3	13
5	36	(Spain) Joan Mir	Kalex	25	+6.728	10	11
6	7	(Italy) Lorenzo Baldassarri	Kalex	25	+9.470	13	10
7	20	(France) Fabio Quartararo	Speed Up	25	+12.068	4	9
8	41	(South Africa) Brad Binder	KTM	25	+12.134	5	8
9	9	(Spain) Jorge Navarro	Kalex	25	+17.425	6	7
10	97	(Spain) Xavi Vierge	Kalex	25	+21.986	11	6
11	24	(Italy) Simone Corsi	Kalex	25	+24.701	21	5
12	87	(Australia) Remy Gardner	Tech 3	25	+25.582	19	4
13	77	(Switzerland) Dominique Aegerter	KTM	25	+25.760	14	3
14	5	(Italy) Andrea Locatelli	Kalex	25	+26.718	20	2
15	2	(Switzerland) Jesko Raffin	Kalex	25	+31.168	17	1
16	16	(United States) Joe Roberts	NTS	25	+38.707	26	
17	4	(South Africa) Steven Odendaal	NTS	25	+39.432	25	
18	73	(Spain) Álex Márquez	Kalex	25	+39.551	8	
19	27	(Spain) Iker Lecuona	KTM	25	+40.436 (Note: 1.8-second penalty.)	18	
20	64	(Netherlands) Bo Bendsneyder	Tech 3	25	+41.814	23	
21	66	(Finland) Niki Tuuli	Kalex	25	+48.043	28	
22	89	(Malaysia) Khairul Idham Pawi	Kalex	25	+53.390	27	
23	95	(France) Jules Danilo	Kalex	25	+1:05.605	29	
24	21	(Italy) Federico Fuligni	Kalex	25	+1:16.602	30	
25	18	(Andorra) Xavi Cardelús	Kalex	25	+1:31.250	33	
Ret	40	(Spain) Augusto Fernández	Kalex	21	Handling	12	
Ret	62	(Italy) Stefano Manzi	Suter	18	Accident	24	
Ret	45	(Japan) Tetsuta Nagashima	Kalex	15	Accident	16	
Ret	12	(Portugal) Sheridan Morais	Kalex	13	Retired	32	
Ret	22	(United Kingdom) Sam Lowes	KTM	11	Accident	15	
Ret	10	(Italy) Luca Marini	Kalex	9	Engine	7	
Ret	52	(United Kingdom) Danny Kent	Speed Up	1	Accident	31	
DSQ	13	(Italy) Romano Fenati	Kalex	18	Black flag	22	
DNS	32	(Spain) Isaac Viñales	Suter		Did not start		
OFFICIAL MOTO2 REPORT

- Romano Fenati was excluded from the race for grabbing Stefano Manzi's brake lever.

=== Moto3 ===
Pos.	No.	Rider	Manufacturer	Laps	Time/Retired	Grid	Points
1	48	(Italy) Lorenzo Dalla Porta	Honda	23	39:38.684	8	25
2	88	(Spain) Jorge Martín	Honda	23	+0.058	1	20
3	21	(Italy) Fabio Di Giannantonio	Honda	23	+0.122	4	16
4	19	(Argentina) Gabriel Rodrigo	KTM	23	+0.822	2	13
5	84	(Czech Republic) Jakub Kornfeil	KTM	23	+6.553	9	11
6	75	(Spain) Albert Arenas	KTM	23	+6.859	13	10
7	10	(Italy) Dennis Foggia	KTM	23	+7.315	20	9
8	40	(South Africa) Darryn Binder	KTM	23	+7.380	23	8
9	16	(Italy) Andrea Migno	KTM	23	+8.608	19	7
10	23	(Italy) Niccolò Antonelli	Honda	23	+8.853	15	6
11	14	(Italy) Tony Arbolino	Honda	23	+10.408	12	5
12	7	(Malaysia) Adam Norrodin	Honda	23	+10.783	14	4
13	27	(Japan) Kaito Toba	Honda	23	+27.817	17	3
14	77	(Spain) Vicente Pérez	KTM	23	+27.897	26	2
15	22	(Japan) Kazuki Masaki	KTM	23	+28.062	22	1
16	42	(Spain) Marcos Ramírez	KTM	23	+47.155	21	
17 (Note: 1-place penalty.)	81	(Italy) Stefano Nepa	KTM	23	+34.385	28	
18	41	(Thailand) Nakarin Atiratphuvapat	Honda	23	+47.510	25	
19	55	(Italy) Yari Montella	Honda	23	+47.577	27	
20	3	(Italy) Kevin Zannoni	TM Racing	22	+1 lap	18	
Ret	12	(Italy) Marco Bezzecchi	KTM	21	Accident	6	
Ret	24	(Japan) Tatsuki Suzuki	Honda	19	Accident	16	
Ret	17	(United Kingdom) John McPhee	KTM	11	Accident Damage	24	
Ret	5	(Spain) Jaume Masiá	KTM	1	Collision	11	
Ret	44	(Spain) Arón Canet	Honda	1	Collision	3	
Ret	71	(Japan) Ayumu Sasaki	Honda	1	Collision	10	
Ret	33	(Italy) Enea Bastianini	Honda	1	Collision	5	
Ret	8	(Italy) Nicolò Bulega	KTM	1	Collision	7	
Ret	72	(Spain) Alonso López	Honda	1	Accident	29	
DNS	65	(Germany) Philipp Öttl	KTM		Did not start		
OFFICIAL MOTO3 REPORT

- Philipp Öttl suffered a concussion following a crash in qualifying and withdrew from the event.

== Championship standings after the race ==
=== MotoGP ===
Pos.	Rider	Points
1	(Spain) Marc Márquez	221
2	(Italy) Andrea Dovizioso	154
3	(Italy) Valentino Rossi	151
4	(Spain) Jorge Lorenzo	130
5	(Spain) Maverick Viñales	124
6	(United Kingdom) Cal Crutchlow	119
7	(France) Johann Zarco	110
8	(Italy) Danilo Petrucci	110
9	(Italy) Andrea Iannone	92
10	(Spain) Álex Rins	79

=== Moto2 ===
Pos.	Rider	Points
1	(Italy) Francesco Bagnaia	214
2	(Portugal) Miguel Oliveira	206
3	(South Africa) Brad Binder	119
4	(Italy) Lorenzo Baldassarri	116
5	(Spain) Joan Mir	114
6	(Spain) Álex Márquez	113
7	(Germany) Marcel Schrötter	107
8	(Spain) Xavi Vierge	96
9	(Italy) Mattia Pasini	95
10	(France) Fabio Quartararo	93

=== Moto3 ===
Pos.	Rider	Points
1	(Spain) Jorge Martín	166
2	(Italy) Marco Bezzecchi	158
3	(Italy) Fabio Di Giannantonio	137
4	(Spain) Arón Canet	118
5	(Italy) Enea Bastianini	117
6	(Argentina) Gabriel Rodrigo	97
7	(Czech Republic) Jakub Kornfeil	91
8	(Italy) Lorenzo Dalla Porta	88
9	(Italy) Andrea Migno	67
10	(Spain) Marcos Ramírez	67

== Notes ==
Previous race: 2018 British Grand Prix	FIM Grand Prix World Championship; 2018 season	Next race: 2018 Aragon Grand Prix
Previous race: 2017 San Marino Grand Prix	San Marino and Rimini Riviera motorcycle Grand Prix	Next race: 2019 San Marino Grand Prix
