= 2016 British motorcycle Grand Prix =

Silverstone racing

(United Kingdom) 2016 British Grand Prix
Race details
- Race 12 of 18 races in the 2016 Grand Prix motorcycle racing season
- Date: 4 September 2016
- Official name: Octo British Grand Prix
- Location: Silverstone Circuit
- Course: Permanent racing facility; 5.900 km (3.666 mi)

MotoGP
Pole position
Rider	(United Kingdom) Cal Crutchlow	Honda
Time	2:19.265	
Fastest lap
Rider	(Spain) Maverick Viñales	Suzuki
Time	2:02.339 on lap 2	
Podium
First	(Spain) Maverick Viñales	Suzuki
Second	(United Kingdom) Cal Crutchlow	Honda
Third	(Italy) Valentino Rossi	Yamaha

Moto2
Pole position
Rider	(United Kingdom) Sam Lowes	Kalex
Time	2:26.740	
Fastest lap
Rider	(Switzerland) Thomas Lüthi	Kalex
Time	2:08.365 on lap 6	
Podium
First	(Switzerland) Thomas Lüthi	Kalex
Second	(Italy) Franco Morbidelli	Kalex
Third	(Japan) Takaaki Nakagami	Kalex

Moto3
Pole position
Rider	(Italy) Francesco Bagnaia	Mahindra
Time	2:33.642	
Fastest lap
Rider	(Italy) Nicolò Bulega	KTM
Time	2:15.336 on lap 17	
Podium
First	(South Africa) Brad Binder	KTM
Second	(Italy) Francesco Bagnaia	Mahindra
Third	(Netherlands) Bo Bendsneyder	KTM

The 2016 British motorcycle Grand Prix was the twelfth round of the 2016 Grand Prix motorcycle racing season. It was held at the Silverstone Circuit in Silverstone on 4 September 2016.

== MotoGP race report ==
Maverick Viñales took his first victory in MotoGP and the first since the 2014 Malaysian Moto2 round. This race marked Suzuki's first victory since the 2007 French Grand Prix.

== Classification ==
=== MotoGP ===
The race was red-flagged on the first lap due to an accident involving Loris Baz and Pol Espargaró; for the subsequent restart, the race distance was shortened from 20 to 19 laps.

Pos.	No.	Rider	Team	Manufacturer	Laps	Time/Retired	Grid	Points
1	25	(Spain) Maverick Viñales	Team Suzuki Ecstar	Suzuki	19	39:03.559	3	25
2	35	(United Kingdom) Cal Crutchlow	LCR Honda	Honda	19	+3.480	1	20
3	46	(Italy) Valentino Rossi	Movistar Yamaha MotoGP	Yamaha	19	+4.063	2	16
4	93	(Spain) Marc Márquez	Repsol Honda Team	Honda	19	+5.992	5	13
5	26	(Spain) Dani Pedrosa	Repsol Honda Team	Honda	19	+6.381	4	11
6	4	(Italy) Andrea Dovizioso	Ducati Team	Ducati	19	+12.303	10	10
7	41	(Spain) Aleix Espargaró	Team Suzuki Ecstar	Suzuki	19	+16.672 (Note: 1-second penalty.)	11	9
8	99	(Spain) Jorge Lorenzo	Movistar Yamaha MotoGP	Yamaha	19	+19.432	9	8
9	9	(Italy) Danilo Petrucci	Octo Pramac Yakhnich	Ducati	19	+25.618	14	7
10	19	(Spain) Álvaro Bautista	Aprilia Racing Team Gresini	Aprilia	19	+32.084	19	6
11	68	(Colombia) Yonny Hernández	Pull & Bear Aspar Team	Ducati	19	+36.131	20	5
12	50	(Republic of Ireland) Eugene Laverty	Pull & Bear Aspar Team	Ducati	19	+39.130	6	4
13	22	(United Kingdom) Alex Lowes	Monster Yamaha Tech 3	Yamaha	19	+40.143	16	3
14	8	(Spain) Héctor Barberá	Avintia Racing	Ducati	19	+41.356	18	2
15	53	(Spain) Tito Rabat	Estrella Galicia 0,0 Marc VDS	Honda	19	+41.943 (Note: 0.5-second penalty.)	21	1
16	43	(Australia) Jack Miller	Estrella Galicia 0,0 Marc VDS	Honda	19	+47.610	12	
17	45	(United Kingdom) Scott Redding	Octo Pramac Yakhnich	Ducati	19	+1:56.177	7	
Ret	29	(Italy) Andrea Iannone	Ducati Team	Ducati	13	Accident	8	
Ret	6	(Germany) Stefan Bradl	Aprilia Racing Team Gresini	Aprilia	2	Accident	17	
DNS	76	(France) Loris Baz	Avintia Racing	Ducati	0	Did not restart	13	
DNS	44	(Spain) Pol Espargaró	Monster Yamaha Tech 3	Yamaha	0	Did not restart	15	

=== Moto2 ===
Pos.	No.	Rider	Manufacturer	Laps	Time/Retired	Grid	Points
1	12	(Switzerland) Thomas Lüthi	Kalex	18	38:49.473	10	25
2	21	(Italy) Franco Morbidelli	Kalex	18	+0.856	6	20
3	30	(Japan) Takaaki Nakagami	Kalex	18	+1.179	11	16
4	55	(Malaysia) Hafizh Syahrin	Kalex	18	+1.359	5	13
5	94	(Germany) Jonas Folger	Kalex	18	+1.970	3	11
6	7	(Italy) Lorenzo Baldassarri	Kalex	18	+5.292	8	10
7	40	(Spain) Álex Rins	Kalex	18	+7.962	19	9
8	24	(Italy) Simone Corsi	Speed Up	18	+8.421	9	8
9	54	(Italy) Mattia Pasini	Kalex	18	+8.556	27	7
10	49	(Spain) Axel Pons	Kalex	18	+13.740	25	6
11	23	(Germany) Marcel Schrötter	Kalex	18	+15.381	23	5
12	11	(Germany) Sandro Cortese	Kalex	18	+16.089	14	4
13	97	(Spain) Xavi Vierge	Tech 3	18	+16.564	17	3
14	60	(Spain) Julián Simón	Speed Up	18	+22.155	13	2
15	52	(United Kingdom) Danny Kent	Kalex	18	+22.190	12	1
16	19	(Belgium) Xavier Siméon	Speed Up	18	+27.892	22	
17	2	(Switzerland) Jesko Raffin	Kalex	18	+29.045	18	
18	14	(Thailand) Ratthapark Wilairot	Kalex	18	+29.195	28	
19	27	(Spain) Iker Lecuona	Kalex	18	+31.565	26	
20	87	(Australia) Remy Gardner	Kalex	18	+31.722	21	
21	22	(United Kingdom) Sam Lowes	Kalex	18	+32.701	1	
22	5	(France) Johann Zarco	Kalex	18	+35.232 (Note: 30-second penalty.)	2	
23	57	(Spain) Edgar Pons	Kalex	18	+38.296	20	
24	70	(Switzerland) Robin Mulhauser	Kalex	18	+38.716	24	
25	73	(Spain) Álex Márquez	Kalex	18	+44.146	4	
Ret	10	(Italy) Luca Marini	Kalex	17	Engine	16	
Ret	44	(Portugal) Miguel Oliveira	Kalex	11	Lost Drive	15	
Ret	32	(Spain) Isaac Viñales	Tech 3	0	Accident	7	
OFFICIAL MOTO2 REPORT

=== Moto3 ===
Pos.	No.	Rider	Manufacturer	Laps	Time/Retired	Grid	Points
1	41	(South Africa) Brad Binder	KTM	17	38:39.142	4	25
2	21	(Italy) Francesco Bagnaia	Mahindra	17	+0.183	1	20
3	64	(Netherlands) Bo Bendsneyder	KTM	17	+0.336	8	16
4	62	(Italy) Stefano Manzi	Mahindra	17	+0.787	34	13
5	8	(Italy) Nicolò Bulega	KTM	17	+0.802	9	11
6	4	(Italy) Fabio Di Giannantonio	Honda	17	+0.883	25	10
7	33	(Italy) Enea Bastianini	Honda	17	+1.016	2	9
8	44	(Spain) Arón Canet	Honda	17	+1.409	12	8
9	36	(Spain) Joan Mir	KTM	17	+1.193 (Note: 1-position penalty.)	5	7
10	88	(Spain) Jorge Martín	Mahindra	17	+1.624	7	6
11	19	(Argentina) Gabriel Rodrigo	KTM	17	+2.400	14	5
12	65	(Germany) Philipp Öttl	KTM	17	+8.585	23	4
13	95	(France) Jules Danilo	Honda	17	+12.807	6	3
14	55	(Italy) Andrea Locatelli	KTM	17	+12.839	11	2
15	84	(Czech Republic) Jakub Kornfeil	Honda	17	+12.885	15	1
16	58	(Spain) Juan Francisco Guevara	KTM	17	+13.174	28	
17	17	(United Kingdom) John McPhee	Peugeot	17	+13.216	17	
18	48	(Italy) Lorenzo Dalla Porta	KTM	17	+13.326	10	
19	76	(Japan) Hiroki Ono	Honda	17	+16.963	19	
20	11	(Belgium) Livio Loi	Honda	17	+32.397	22	
21	40	(South Africa) Darryn Binder	Mahindra	17	+39.125	27	
22	89	(Malaysia) Khairul Idham Pawi	Honda	17	+39.140	16	
23	7	(Malaysia) Adam Norrodin	Honda	17	+39.257	24	
24	53	(Italy) Marco Bezzecchi	Mahindra	17	+39.414	35	
25	24	(Japan) Tatsuki Suzuki	Mahindra	17	+39.516	29	
26	6	(Spain) María Herrera	KTM	17	+39.714	13	
27	3	(Italy) Fabio Spiranelli	Mahindra	17	+51.679	33	
28	77	(Italy) Lorenzo Petrarca	Mahindra	17	+1:09.870	30	
29	16	(Italy) Andrea Migno	KTM	17	+1:32.740	20	
Ret	9	(Spain) Jorge Navarro	Honda	15	Accident	18	
Ret	43	(Italy) Stefano Valtulini	Mahindra	15	Accident Damage	31	
Ret	42	(Spain) Marcos Ramírez	Mahindra	14	Mechanical	26	
Ret	20	(France) Fabio Quartararo	KTM	5	Lost Power	21	
Ret	12	(Spain) Albert Arenas	Peugeot	0	Electronics	32	
DSQ	23	(Italy) Niccolò Antonelli	Honda	17	(+0.920) (Note: Disqualified due to a technical infringement.)	3	
OFFICIAL MOTO3 REPORT

== Championship standings after the race (MotoGP) ==
Below are the standings for the top five riders and constructors after round twelve has concluded.

Riders' Championship standings

Pos.	Rider	Points
1	(Spain) Marc Marquez	210
2	(Italy) Valentino Rossi	160
3	(Spain) Jorge Lorenzo	146
4	(Spain) Maverick Vinales	125
5	(Spain) Dani Pedrosa	120

Constructors' Championship standings

Pos.	Constructor	Points
1	(Japan) Honda	241
2	(Japan) Yamaha	238
3	(Italy) Ducati	172
4	(Japan) Suzuki	131
5	(Italy) Aprilia	59

- Note: Only the top five positions are included for both sets of standings.

== Notes ==
Previous race: 2016 Czech Republic Grand Prix	FIM Grand Prix World Championship; 2016 season	Next race: 2016 San Marino Grand Prix
Previous race: 2015 British Grand Prix	British motorcycle Grand Prix	Next race: 2017 British Grand Prix
