= Andrea Migno =

Italian motorcycle racer

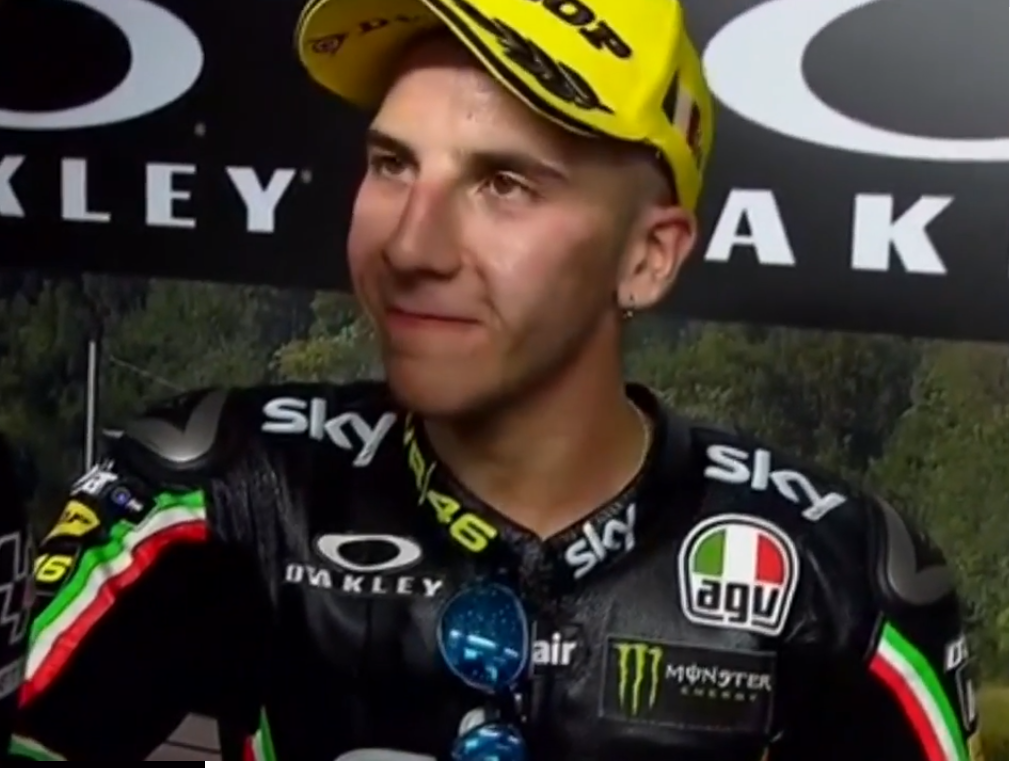
- Migno in 2017
- Nationality: Italian
- Born: 10 January 1996 (age 30); Cattolica, Italy
- Current team: Yamaha VR46 Master Camp Team
- Bike number: 6
Motorcycle racing career statistics
Moto2 World Championship
Active years	2024
Manufacturers	Kalex
2024 championship position	39th (0 pts)
Starts / Wins / Podiums / Poles / F. laps / Points; 1 / 0 / 0 / 0 / 0 / 0
Moto3 World Championship
Active years	2013–2023
Manufacturers	FTR, Mahindra, KTM, Honda
2023 championship position	25th (17 pts)
Starts / Wins / Podiums / Poles / F. laps / Points; 160 / 2 / 12 / 4 / 4 / 676
MotoE World Championship
Active years	2023
Manufacturers	Ducati
2023 championship position	20th (2 pts)
Starts / Wins / Podiums / Poles / F. laps / Points; 2 / 0 / 0 / 0 / 0 / 2
Supersport World Championship
Active years	2023
Manufacturers	Honda
2023 championship position	NC (0 pts)
Starts / Wins / Podiums / Poles / F. laps / Points; 2 / 0 / 0 / 0 / 0 / 0

Andrea Migno (born 10 January 1996) is an Italian former Grand Prix motorcycle racer. Migno has also been a competitor in the Italian Honda 125GP Trofeo, the Red Bull MotoGP Rookies Cup, and the CEV 125GP Championship. In 2017 He won the Dunlop ForeverForward Award

Migno is now a rider coach and video analyst for VR46 Racing Team.

== Career ==
=== Early career ===
Migno started practicing racing when he was eight years old. He often asked his father to take a mini-bike circuit near their home. From then on, he never left the world of two-wheeled racing. From 2004 to 2008, Migno participated in various minibike and MiniGP championships. He won the European Championship Minibike Junior A in 2005 and was runner-up in the European Championship Minibike Junior B in 2007.

=== Junior career ===
In 2008, Migno raced in the Catalan Championship PreGP 125 cc and placed sixth. A year later, he competed in the Campeonato Mediterraneo Velocidad and the Cuna de Campeones Bancaja. He also raced in the Italian Honda Trophy 125 GP in 2010 and finished sixth. And in 2011, he debuted in the Red Bull MotoGP Rookies Cup.

In addition to the Red Bull MotoGP Rookies Cup, Migno also debuted in the CEV 125 in 2011 and achieved a podium finish at Jerez. The following season, the race had changed format to CEV Moto3 and Migno also moved to the Speed Master Team team He ended the season in 22nd place and got 12 points.

In 2013, Migno moved to GMT Racing and finished the season in eighth place.

=== Moto3 ===
Migno debuted in the Moto3 world championship in 2013 on the FTR M313 as a wild card in Catalan and Brno. A year later, he replaced Arthur Sissis at Mahindra from the British series until the end of the season. He only started racing full-time in 2015 with SKY Racing Team VR46. He achieved his best finish at Aragon, which was ninth, and ended the season in 19th place. Migno earned his first Moto3 podium in the 2016 Assen series. The final series in Valencia also added to his podium once again. He finished the season in 17th place.

In the 2017 season, Migno decided to move to Ángel Nieto Team Moto3, got one podium at Le Mans and achieved 11th place. The following season, he moved again to Bester Capital Dubai. He got two podiums and achieved 13th place at the end of the season.

==== 2023 ====
Until the end of 2022, Migno still did not get a slot to join the Moto3 team. Then at the start of the 2023 season, he officially replaced Lorenzo Fellon at the CIP Green Power team due to an injury he suffered at the Portuguese Grand Prix.

== Career statistics ==
=== Red Bull Rookies Cup ===
==== Races by year ====
(key) (Races in bold indicate pole position, races in italics indicate fastest lap)

Year	1	2	3	4	5	6	7	8	9	10	11	12	13	14	Pos	Pts
2011	SPA1; 11	SPA2; Ret	POR1; 9	POR2; Ret	GBR1; 21	GBR2; 16	NED1; 19	NED2; 10	ITA; 15	GER1; 8	GER2; 10	CZE1; 15	CZE2; 13	RSM; 14	20th	39

=== CEV Moto3 Championship ===
==== Races by year ====
(key) (Races in bold indicate pole position, races in italics indicate fastest lap)

Year	Bike	1	2	3	4	5	6	7	8	9	Pos	Pts
2012	Honda	JER; 10	NAV; 13	ARA; 19	CAT; Ret	ALB1	ALB2	VAL; 13			22nd	12
2013	FTR Honda	CAT1; Ret	CAT2; 8	ARA; 6	ALB1; Ret	**ALB2**; 6	NAV; Ret	VAL1; 6	VAL1; 6	JER; Ret	8th	48

=== FIM CEV Moto3 International Championship ===
==== Races by year ====
(key) (Races in bold indicate pole position, races in italics indicate fastest lap)

Year	Bike	1	2	3	4	5	6	7	8	9	10	11	Pos	Pts
2014	Honda	JER1; 6	JER2; 3	LMS; 5	ARA; 4	CAT1; 6	CAT2; 6	ALB; 5	NAV; 5	ALG	VAL1	VAL1	7th	92

=== Grand Prix motorcycle racing ===
==== By season ====
Season	Class	Motorcycle	Team	Race	Win	Podium	Pole	FLap	Pts	Plcd
2013	Moto3	FTR	GMT Racing	2	0	0	0	0	0	NC
2014	Moto3	Mahindra	Mahindra Racing	7	0	0	0	0	8	25th
2015	Moto3	KTM	Sky Racing Team VR46	18	0	0	0	0	35	19th
2016	Moto3	KTM	Sky Racing Team VR46	18	0	2	0	0	63	17th
2017	Moto3	KTM	Sky Racing Team VR46	18	1	1	0	1	118	9th
2018	Moto3	KTM	Ángel Nieto Team Moto3	18	0	1	0	0	84	11th
2019	Moto3	KTM	Bester Capital Dubai	19	0	2	1	1	78	13th
2020	Moto3	KTM	Sky Racing Team VR46	15	0	0	0	0	60	15th
2021	Moto3	Honda	Rivacold Snipers Team	18	0	3	2	1	110	10th
2022	Moto3	Honda	Rivacold Snipers Team	20	1	2	1	1	103	9th
2023	Moto3	KTM	CIP Green Power	7	0	1	0	0	17	25th
2023	MotoE	Ducati	Prettl Pramac MotoE	2	0	0	0	0	2	20th
2024	Moto2	Kalex	Yamaha VR46 Master Camp Team	1	0	0	0	0	0	39th
Total				**163**	**2**	**12**	**4**	**4**	**678**	

==== By class ====
Class	Seasons	1st GP	1st Pod	1st Win	Race	Win	Podiums	Pole	FLap	Pts	WChmp
Moto2	2024	2024 Solidarity			1	0	0	0	0	0	0
Moto3	2013–2023	2013 Catalunya	2016 Netherlands	2017 Italy	160	2	12	4	4	676	0
MotoE	2023	2023 San Marino			2	0	0	0	0	2	0
Total	2013–present				**163**	**2**	**12**	**4**	**4**	**678**	**0**

==== Races by year ====
(key) (Races in bold indicate pole position, races in italics indicate fastest lap)

Year	Class	Bike	1	2	3	4	5	6	7	8	9	10	11	12	13	14	15	16	17	18	19	20	Pos	Pts
2013	Moto3	FTR	QAT	AME	SPA	FRA	ITA	CAT; 25	NED	GER	INP	CZE; 26	GBR	RSM	ARA	MAL	AUS	JPN	VAL				NC	0
2014	Moto3	Mahindra	QAT	AME	ARG	SPA	FRA	ITA	CAT	NED	GER	INP	CZE	GBR; Ret	RSM; 8	ARA; Ret	JPN; Ret	AUS; 17	MAL; Ret	VAL; 18			25th	8
2015	Moto3	KTM	QAT; 24	AME; 12	ARG; 17	SPA; 21	FRA; 9	ITA; 15	CAT; 28	NED; 12	GER; 21	INP; 20	CZE; 13	GBR; 15	RSM; 13	ARA; 9	JPN; 20	AUS; Ret	MAL; 24	VAL; 11			19th	35
2016	Moto3	KTM	QAT; 17	AME; 29	ARG; 15	SPA; 11	FRA; 7	ITA; 10	CAT; 18	NED; 3	GER; Ret	AUT; 25	CZE; 12	GBR; Ret	RSM; 15	ARA; 11	JPN; 24	AUS; Ret	MAL; Ret	VAL; 3			17th	63
2017	Moto3	KTM	QAT; 6	ARG; 5	AME; 12	SPA; 6	FRA; 8	ITA; 1	CAT; 8	NED; 14	GER; 16	CZE; 11	AUT; 21	GBR; 8	RSM; 9	ARA; 11	JPN; 13	AUS; 14	MAL; 6	VAL; 16			9th	118
2018	Moto3	KTM	QAT; 10	ARG; 13	AME; 4	SPA; 13	FRA; 2	ITA; 5	CAT; Ret	NED; 26	GER; 12	CZE; 20	AUT; Ret	GBR; C	RSM; 9	ARA; 12	THA; 11	JPN; 13	AUS; 13	MAL; 16	VAL; 14		11th	84
2019	Moto3	KTM	QAT; 14	ARG; 11	AME; 3	SPA; 10	FRA; 5	ITA; Ret	CAT; Ret	NED; 19	GER; 19	CZE; 7	AUT; 26	GBR; 17	RSM; 13	ARA; 16	THA; NC	JPN; 10	AUS; Ret	MAL; Ret	**VAL**; 2		13th	78
2020	Moto3	KTM	QAT; 16	SPA; 4	ANC; 22	CZE; 14	AUT; 12	STY; 13	RSM; 10	EMI; 8	CAT; Ret	FRA; 5	ARA; Ret	TER; 18	EUR; 12	VAL; 7	POR; 21						15th	60
2021	Moto3	Honda	QAT; Ret	DOH; 4	**POR**; 3	SPA; 4	**FRA**; 11	ITA; Ret	CAT; Ret	GER; 5	NED; Ret	STY; 17	AUT; Ret	GBR; Ret	ARA; 6	RSM; 3	AME; 10	EMI; Ret	ALR; 2	VAL; 18			10th	110
2022	Moto3	Honda	QAT; 1	INA; Ret	ARG; Ret	**AME**; 3	POR; 7	SPA; 14	FRA; 10	ITA; 4	CAT; Ret	GER; 11	NED; 15	GBR; 9	AUT; 23	RSM; Ret	ARA; 18	JPN; 9	THA; 7	AUS; 16	MAL; 14	VAL; 15	9th	103
2023	MotoE	Ducati	FRA1	FRA2	ITA1	ITA2	GER1	GER2	NED1	NED2	GBR1	GBR2	AUT1	AUT2	CAT1	CAT2	RSM1; NC	RSM2; 14					20th	2
2023	Moto3	KTM	POR	ARG; 3	AME; 19	SPA; 17	FRA; Ret	ITA; 16	GER; 15	NED; 19	GBR	AUT	CAT	RSM	IND	JPN	INA	AUS	THA	MAL	QAT	VAL	25th	17
2024	Moto2	Kalex	QAT	POR	AME	SPA	FRA	CAT	ITA	NED	GER	GBR	AUT	ARA	RSM	EMI	INA	JPN	AUS	THA	MAL	SLD; 25	39th	0

=== Supersport World Championship ===
==== By season ====
Season	Class	Motorcycle	Team	Number	Race	Win	Podium	Pole	FLap	Pts	Plcd
2023	WSSP	Honda CBR600RR	Petronas MIE – MS Racing Honda Team	88	2	0	0	0	0	0	NC
Total					**2**	**0**	**0**	**0**	**0**	**0**	

==== Races by year ====
(key) (Races in bold indicate pole position, races in italics indicate fastest lap)

Year	Bike	1	2	3	4	5	6	7	8	9	10	11	12	13	14	15	16	17	18	19	20	21	22	23	24	Pos	Pts
2023	Honda	AUS	AUS	INA	INA	NED	NED	SPA	SPA	EMI	EMI	GBR	GBR	ITA	ITA	CZE	CZE	FRA	FRA	SPA	SPA	POR; 27	POR; 23	JER	JER	NC	0
