= 2017 British motorcycle Grand Prix =

(United Kingdom) 2017 British Grand Prix
Race details
- Race 12 of 18 races in the 2017 Grand Prix motorcycle racing season
- Date: 27 August 2017
- Official name: Octo British Grand Prix
- Location: Silverstone Circuit
- Course: Permanent racing facility; 5.900 km (3.666 mi)

MotoGP
Pole position
Rider	(Spain) Marc Márquez	Honda
Time	1:59.941	
Fastest lap
Rider	(Spain) Marc Márquez	Honda
Time	2:01.560 on lap 10	
Podium
First	(Italy) Andrea Dovizioso	Ducati
Second	(Spain) Maverick Viñales	Yamaha
Third	(Italy) Valentino Rossi	Yamaha

Moto2
Pole position
Rider	(Italy) Mattia Pasini	Kalex
Time	2:06.572	
Fastest lap
Rider	(Italy) Franco Morbidelli	Kalex
Time	2:06.690 on lap 3	
Podium
First	(Japan) Takaaki Nakagami	Kalex
Second	(Italy) Mattia Pasini	Kalex
Third	(Italy) Franco Morbidelli	Kalex

Moto3
Pole position
Rider	(Italy) Romano Fenati	Honda
Time	2:12.846	
Fastest lap
Rider	(Spain) Jorge Martín	Honda
Time	2:13.025 on lap 2	
Podium
First	(Spain) Arón Canet	Honda
Second	(Italy) Enea Bastianini	Honda
Third	(Spain) Jorge Martín	Honda

The 2017 British motorcycle Grand Prix was the twelfth round of the 2017 MotoGP season. It was held at the Silverstone Circuit in Silverstone on 27 August 2017.

== Classification ==
=== MotoGP ===
Pos.	No.	Rider	Team	Manufacturer	Laps	Time/Retired	Grid	Points
1	4	(Italy) Andrea Dovizioso	Ducati Team	Ducati	20	40:45.496	6	25
2	25	(Spain) Maverick Viñales	Movistar Yamaha MotoGP	Yamaha	20	+0.114	4	20
3	46	(Italy) Valentino Rossi	Movistar Yamaha MotoGP	Yamaha	20	+0.749	2	16
4	35	(United Kingdom) Cal Crutchlow	LCR Honda	Honda	20	+1.679	3	13
5	99	(Spain) Jorge Lorenzo	Ducati Team	Ducati	20	+3.508	5	11
6	5	(France) Johann Zarco	Monster Yamaha Tech 3	Yamaha	20	+7.001	8	10
7	26	(Spain) Dani Pedrosa	Repsol Honda Team	Honda	20	+10.944	7	9
8	45	(United Kingdom) Scott Redding	Octo Pramac Racing	Ducati	20	+13.627	11	8
9	42	(Spain) Álex Rins	Team Suzuki Ecstar	Suzuki	20	+15.661	12	7
10	19	(Spain) Álvaro Bautista	Pull&Bear Aspar Team	Ducati	20	+25.279	13	6
11	44	(Spain) Pol Espargaró	Red Bull KTM Factory Racing	KTM	20	+30.336	10	5
12	53	(Spain) Tito Rabat	EG 0,0 Marc VDS	Honda	20	+31.609	21	4
13	17	(Czech Republic) Karel Abraham	Pull&Bear Aspar Team	Ducati	20	+31.945	19	3
14	8	(Spain) Héctor Barberá	Reale Avintia Racing	Ducati	20	+33.567	15	2
15	76	(France) Loris Baz	Reale Avintia Racing	Ducati	20	+33.901	20	1
16	43	(Australia) Jack Miller	EG 0,0 Marc VDS	Honda	20	+43.012	16	
17	38	(United Kingdom) Bradley Smith	Red Bull KTM Factory Racing	KTM	20	+48.683	18	
Ret	41	(Spain) Aleix Espargaró	Aprilia Racing Team Gresini	Aprilia	18	Electronics	9	
Ret	9	(Italy) Danilo Petrucci	Octo Pramac Racing	Ducati	17	Accident	17	
Ret	29	(Italy) Andrea Iannone	Team Suzuki Ecstar	Suzuki	17	Accident	14	
Ret	93	(Spain) Marc Márquez	Repsol Honda Team	Honda	13	Engine	1	
Ret	22	(United Kingdom) Sam Lowes	Aprilia Racing Team Gresini	Aprilia	5	Accident	22	
DNS	94	(Germany) Jonas Folger	Monster Yamaha Tech 3	Yamaha		Did not start		
Sources:

- Jonas Folger crashed during a Sunday warm-up session and was declared unfit to start the race.

=== Moto2 ===
Pos.	No.	Rider	Manufacturer	Laps	Time/Retired	Grid	Points
1	30	(Japan) Takaaki Nakagami	Kalex	18	38:20.883	4	25
2	54	(Italy) Mattia Pasini	Kalex	18	+0.724	1	20
3	21	(Italy) Franco Morbidelli	Kalex	18	+2.678	3	16
4	12	(Switzerland) Thomas Lüthi	Kalex	18	+4.645	9	13
5	42	(Italy) Francesco Bagnaia	Kalex	18	+9.515	11	11
6	24	(Italy) Simone Corsi	Speed Up	18	+9.955	10	10
7	62	(Italy) Stefano Manzi	Kalex	18	+10.402	14	9
8	44	(Portugal) Miguel Oliveira	KTM	18	+10.463	8	8
9	41	(South Africa) Brad Binder	KTM	18	+10.762	20	7
10	77	(Switzerland) Dominique Aegerter	Suter	18	+11.454	6	6
11	10	(Italy) Luca Marini	Kalex	18	+12.787	5	5
12	97	(Spain) Xavi Vierge	Tech 3	18	+13.022	13	4
13	9	(Spain) Jorge Navarro	Kalex	18	+19.990 (Note: 2.3-second penalty.)	12	3
14	73	(Spain) Álex Márquez	Kalex	18	+21.751	2	2
15	49	(Spain) Axel Pons	Kalex	18	+22.174	18	1
16	40	(France) Fabio Quartararo	Kalex	18	+24.145	23	
17	55	(Malaysia) Hafizh Syahrin	Kalex	18	+25.010	21	
18	32	(Spain) Isaac Viñales	Kalex	18	+26.711	15	
19	45	(Japan) Tetsuta Nagashima	Kalex	18	+30.680	25	
20	87	(Australia) Remy Gardner	Tech 3	18	+30.825	19	
21	20	(United States) Joe Roberts	Kalex	18	+34.698	28	
22	57	(Spain) Edgar Pons	Kalex	18	+35.502	22	
23	5	(Italy) Andrea Locatelli	Kalex	18	+35.988 (Note: 1.4-second penalty.)	27	
24	15	(San Marino) Alex de Angelis	Kalex	18	+38.943	24	
25	94	(United Kingdom) Jake Dixon	Suter	18	+44.079	31	
26	37	(Spain) Augusto Fernández	Speed Up	18	+44.197	29	
27	2	(Switzerland) Jesko Raffin	Kalex	18	+46.849	30	
28	89	(Malaysia) Khairul Idham Pawi	Kalex	18	+47.110	32	
29	7	(Italy) Lorenzo Baldassarri	Kalex	18	+1:04.182	7	
30	6	(United Kingdom) Tarran Mackenzie	Suter	18	+1:32.304	26	
Ret	11	(Germany) Sandro Cortese	Suter	13	Accident	16	
Ret	27	(Spain) Iker Lecuona	Kalex	7	Accident Damage	17	
OFFICIAL MOTO2 REPORT

=== Moto3 ===
The race was red-flagged during the final lap (lap 17) after a collision between Juan Francisco Guevara and Bo Bendsneyder. The remaining riders actually finished the remainder of the lap, thus completing the original 17-lap race distance. However, the final result was based on the classification of the riders at the end of lap 16.

Pos.	No.	Rider	Manufacturer	Laps	Time/Retired	Grid	Points
1	44	(Spain) Arón Canet	Honda	16	35:53.028	16	25
2	33	(Italy) Enea Bastianini	Honda	16	+0.063	15	20
3	88	(Spain) Jorge Martín	Honda	16	+0.111	8	16
4	19	(Argentina) Gabriel Rodrigo	KTM	16	+0.232	3	13
5	36	(Spain) Joan Mir	Honda	16	+0.455	2	11
6	11	(Belgium) Livio Loi	Honda	16	+0.520	13	10
7	5	(Italy) Romano Fenati	Honda	16	+0.678	1	9
8	16	(Italy) Andrea Migno	KTM	16	+0.702	6	8
9	65	(Germany) Philipp Öttl	KTM	16	+1.200	14	7
10	21	(Italy) Fabio Di Giannantonio	Honda	16	+1.461	12	6
11	24	(Japan) Tatsuki Suzuki	Honda	16	+1.755	18	5
12	7	(Malaysia) Adam Norrodin	Honda	16	+2.055	25	4
13	17	(United Kingdom) John McPhee	Honda	16	+2.196	4	3
14	41	(Thailand) Nakarin Atiratphuvapat	Honda	16	+3.812	23	2
15	96	(Italy) Manuel Pagliani	Mahindra	16	+3.860	29	1
16	23	(Italy) Niccolò Antonelli	KTM	16	+4.292	5	
17	48	(Italy) Lorenzo Dalla Porta	Mahindra	16	+4.560	21	
18	71	(Japan) Ayumu Sasaki	Honda	16	+4.582 (Note: 2.2-second penalty.)	19	
19	12	(Italy) Marco Bezzecchi	Mahindra	16	+4.678	24	
20 (Note: 1-place penalty.)	8	(Italy) Nicolò Bulega	KTM	16	+4.597	7	
21	69	(United Kingdom) Tom Booth-Amos	KTM	16	+15.242	32	
22	95	(France) Jules Danilo	Honda	16	+15.552	17	
23	84	(Czech Republic) Jakub Kornfeil	Peugeot	16	+17.687 (Note: 2.4-second penalty.)	31	
24	4	(Finland) Patrik Pulkkinen	Peugeot	16	+18.671	33	
25	14	(Italy) Tony Arbolino	Honda	16	+19.339 (Note: 3.2-second penalty.)	26	
26	6	(Spain) María Herrera	KTM	16	+21.434 (Note: 2.9-second penalty.)	22	
27	75	(Spain) Albert Arenas	Mahindra	16	+22.584 (Note: 7.2-second penalty.)	27	
Ret	58	(Spain) Juan Francisco Guevara	KTM	15	Collision	9	
Ret	64	(Netherlands) Bo Bendsneyder	KTM	15	Collision	10	
Ret	47	(United Kingdom) Jake Archer	KTM	13	Retired	30	
Ret	42	(Spain) Marcos Ramírez	KTM	12	Accident	20	
Ret	27	(Japan) Kaito Toba	Honda	9	Dizziness	11	
Ret	15	(Spain) Jaume Masiá	KTM	5	Accident	28	
OFFICIAL MOTO3 REPORT

== Championship standings after the race ==
=== MotoGP ===
Below are the standings for the top five riders and constructors after round twelve has concluded.

Riders' Championship standings

Pos.	Rider	Points
1	(Italy) Andrea Dovizioso	183
2	(Spain) Marc Márquez	174
3	(Spain) Maverick Viñales	170
4	(Italy) Valentino Rossi	157
5	(Spain) Dani Pedrosa	148

Constructors' Championship standings

Pos.	Constructor	Points
1	(Japan) Yamaha	231
2	(Japan) Honda	224
3	(Italy) Ducati	212
4	(Japan) Suzuki	52
5	(Italy) Aprilia	45

- Note: Only the top five positions are included for both sets of standings.

=== Moto2 ===
Pos.	Rider	Points
1	(Italy) Franco Morbidelli	223
2	(Switzerland) Thomas Lüthi	194
3	(Spain) Álex Márquez	155
4	(Portugal) Miguel Oliveira	141
5	(Italy) Francesco Bagnaia	111
6	(Italy) Mattia Pasini	104
7	(Japan) Takaaki Nakagami	104
8	(Italy) Simone Corsi	78
9	(Switzerland) Dominique Aegerter	63
10	(Italy) Luca Marini	59

=== Moto3 ===
Pos.	Rider	Points
1	(Spain) Joan Mir	226
2	(Spain) Arón Canet	162
3	(Italy) Romano Fenati	160
4	(Spain) Jorge Martín	121
5	(Italy) Fabio Di Giannantonio	101
6	(United Kingdom) John McPhee	96
7	(Spain) Marcos Ramírez	92
8	(Italy) Andrea Migno	91
9	(Italy) Enea Bastianini	85
10	(Germany) Philipp Öttl	71

== Notes ==
Previous race: 2017 Austrian Grand Prix	FIM Grand Prix World Championship; 2017 season	Next race: 2017 San Marino Grand Prix
Previous race: 2016 British Grand Prix	British motorcycle Grand Prix	Next race: 2018 British Grand Prix
