= 2019 Catalan motorcycle Grand Prix =

(Catalonia) 2019 Catalan Grand Prix
Race details
- Race 7 of 19 races in the 2019 Grand Prix motorcycle racing season
- Date: 16 June 2019
- Official name: Gran Premi Monster Energy de Catalunya
- Location: Circuit de Barcelona-Catalunya, Montmeló, Spain
- Course: Permanent racing facility; 4.627 km (2.875 mi)

MotoGP
Pole position
Rider	(France) Fabio Quartararo	Yamaha
Time	1:39.484	
Fastest lap
Rider	(Spain) Marc Márquez	Honda
Time	1:40.507 on lap 5	
Podium
First	(Spain) Marc Márquez	Honda
Second	(France) Fabio Quartararo	Yamaha
Third	(Italy) Danilo Petrucci	Ducati

Moto2
Pole position
Rider	(Spain) Augusto Fernández	Kalex
Time	1:44.170	
Fastest lap
Rider	(Spain) Álex Márquez	Kalex
Time	1:43.871 on lap 3	
Podium
First	(Spain) Álex Márquez	Kalex
Second	(Switzerland) Thomas Lüthi	Kalex
Third	(Spain) Jorge Navarro	Speed Up

Moto3
Pole position
Rider	(Argentina) Gabriel Rodrigo	Honda
Time	1:48.450	
Fastest lap
Rider	(Japan) Kaito Toba	Honda
Time	1:48.803 on lap 4	
Podium
First	(Spain) Marcos Ramírez	Honda
Second	(Spain) Arón Canet	KTM
Third	(Italy) Celestino Vietti	KTM

The 2019 Catalan motorcycle Grand Prix was the seventh round of the 2019 MotoGP season. It was held at the Circuit de Barcelona-Catalunya in Montmeló on 16 June 2019.

== Classification ==
=== MotoGP ===
Pos.	No.	Rider	Team	Manufacturer	Laps	Time/Retired	Grid	Points
1	93	(Spain) Marc Márquez	Repsol Honda Team	Honda	24	40:31.175	2	25
2	20	(France) Fabio Quartararo	Petronas Yamaha SRT	Yamaha	24	+2.660	1	20
3	9	(Italy) Danilo Petrucci	Mission Winnow Ducati	Ducati	24	+4.537	7	16
4	42	(Spain) Álex Rins	Team Suzuki Ecstar	Suzuki	24	+6.602	8	13
5	43	(Australia) Jack Miller	Pramac Racing	Ducati	24	+6.870	14	11
6	36	(Spain) Joan Mir	Team Suzuki Ecstar	Suzuki	24	+7.040	11	10
7	44	(Spain) Pol Espargaró	Red Bull KTM Factory Racing	KTM	24	+16.144	12	9
8	30	(Japan) Takaaki Nakagami	LCR Honda Idemitsu	Honda	24	+17.969	16	8
9	53	(Spain) Tito Rabat	Reale Avintia Racing	Ducati	24	+22.661	19	7
10	5	(France) Johann Zarco	Red Bull KTM Factory Racing	KTM	24	+26.228	18	6
11	29	(Italy) Andrea Iannone	Aprilia Racing Team Gresini	Aprilia	24	+32.036	24	5
12	88	(Portugal) Miguel Oliveira	Red Bull KTM Tech3	KTM	24	+44.666	20	4
13	50	(France) Sylvain Guintoli	Team Suzuki Ecstar	Suzuki	24	+51.363	23	3
Ret	35	(United Kingdom) Cal Crutchlow	LCR Honda Castrol	Honda	18	Accident	9	
Ret	21	(Italy) Franco Morbidelli	Petronas Yamaha SRT	Yamaha	16	Accident Damage	3	
Ret	63	(Italy) Francesco Bagnaia	Pramac Racing	Ducati	5	Accident	13	
Ret	55	(Malaysia) Hafizh Syahrin	Red Bull KTM Tech3	KTM	3	Engine	21	
Ret	46	(Italy) Valentino Rossi	Monster Energy Yamaha MotoGP	Yamaha	2	Collision Damage	4	
Ret	4	(Italy) Andrea Dovizioso	Mission Winnow Ducati	Ducati	2	Collision Damage	5	
Ret	12	(Spain) Maverick Viñales	Monster Energy Yamaha MotoGP	Yamaha	1	Collision	6 (Note: 3-place grid penalty.)	
Ret	99	(Spain) Jorge Lorenzo	Repsol Honda Team	Honda	1	Accident	10	
Ret	41	(Spain) Aleix Espargaró	Aprilia Racing Team Gresini	Aprilia	1	Rider In Pain	17	
Ret	17	(Czech Republic) Karel Abraham	Reale Avintia Racing	Ducati	0	Accident	15	
Ret	38	(United Kingdom) Bradley Smith	Aprilia Racing Team	Aprilia	0	Collision	22	

=== Moto2 ===
Pos.	No.	Rider	Manufacturer	Laps	Time/Retired	Grid	Points
1	73	(Spain) Álex Márquez	Kalex	22	38:25.678	6	25
2	12	(Switzerland) Thomas Lüthi	Kalex	22	+1.989	2	20
3	9	(Spain) Jorge Navarro	Speed Up	22	+2.532	4	16
4	40	(Spain) Augusto Fernández	Kalex	22	+3.802	1	13
5	33	(Italy) Enea Bastianini	Kalex	22	+7.472	10	11
6	10	(Italy) Luca Marini	Kalex	22	+13.996	13	10
7	23	(Germany) Marcel Schrötter	Kalex	22	+14.565	12	9
8	97	(Spain) Xavi Vierge	Kalex	22	+14.953	20	8
9	22	(United Kingdom) Sam Lowes	Kalex	22	+15.898	3	7
10	45	(Japan) Tetsuta Nagashima	Kalex	22	+17.947	16	6
11	41	(South Africa) Brad Binder	KTM	22	+20.891	19	5
12	5	(Italy) Andrea Locatelli	Kalex	22	+20.930	9	4
13	11	(Italy) Nicolò Bulega	Kalex	22	+22.352	8	3
14	24	(Italy) Simone Corsi	Kalex	22	+25.192	18	2
15	88	(Spain) Jorge Martín	KTM	22	+27.132	17	1
16	77	(Switzerland) Dominique Aegerter	MV Agusta	22	+30.395	21	
17	35	(Thailand) Somkiat Chantra	Kalex	22	+32.230	25	
18	64	(Netherlands) Bo Bendsneyder	NTS	22	+33.315	14	
19	94	(Germany) Jonas Folger	Kalex	22	+39.441	23	
20	16	(United States) Joe Roberts	KTM	22	+42.600	29	
21	20	(Indonesia) Dimas Ekky Pratama	Kalex	22	+44.461	24	
22	4	(South Africa) Steven Odendaal	NTS	22	+47.623	27	
23	72	(Italy) Marco Bezzecchi	KTM	22	+54.911	31	
24	3	(Germany) Lukas Tulovic	KTM	22	+59.776	28	
25	18	(Andorra) Xavi Cardelús	KTM	22	+1:22.064	30	
Ret	96	(United Kingdom) Jake Dixon	KTM	21	Accident	26	
Ret	62	(Italy) Stefano Manzi	MV Agusta	16	Accident Damage	22	
Ret	21	(Italy) Fabio Di Giannantonio	Speed Up	13	Accident Damage	5	
Ret	7	(Italy) Lorenzo Baldassarri	Kalex	6	Accident	7	
Ret	27	(Spain) Iker Lecuona	KTM	2	Clutch	15	
Ret	87	(Australia) Remy Gardner	Kalex	0	Accident	11	
DNS	65	(Germany) Philipp Öttl	KTM		Did not start		
OFFICIAL MOTO2 REPORT

=== Moto3 ===
Pos.	No.	Rider	Manufacturer	Laps	Time/Retired	Grid	Points
1	42	(Spain) Marcos Ramírez	Honda	21	38:36.156	10	25
2	44	(Spain) Arón Canet	KTM	21	+0.119	5	20
3	13	(Italy) Celestino Vietti	KTM	21	+0.146	21	16
4	21	(Spain) Alonso López	Honda	21	+0.235	7	13
5	7	(Italy) Dennis Foggia	KTM	21	+0.947	30 (Note: 12-place grid penalty.)	11
6	79	(Japan) Ai Ogura	Honda	21	+1.008	2	10
7	55	(Italy) Romano Fenati	Honda	21	+1.068	18	9
8	71	(Japan) Ayumu Sasaki	Honda	21	+1.358	19	8
9	6	(Japan) Ryusei Yamanaka	Honda	21	+1.984	17	7
10	84	(Czech Republic) Jakub Kornfeil	KTM	21	+2.472	22	6
11	23	(Italy) Niccolò Antonelli	Honda	21	+2.729	27	5
12	99	(Spain) Carlos Tatay	KTM	21	+2.980	15	4
13	17	(United Kingdom) John McPhee	Honda	21	+3.264	9	3
14	69	(United Kingdom) Tom Booth-Amos	KTM	21	+11.120 (Note: 3-second penalty.)	26	2
15	40	(South Africa) Darryn Binder	KTM	21	+18.467	14	1
16	22	(Japan) Kazuki Masaki	KTM	21	+21.845	28	
17	54	(Italy) Riccardo Rossi	Honda	21	+39.997	25	
18	77	(Spain) Vicente Pérez	KTM	21	+54.306	29 (Note: 6-place grid penalty.)	
19	24	(Japan) Tatsuki Suzuki	Honda	21	+1:00.726	4	
Ret	27	(Japan) Kaito Toba	Honda	20	Accident	24	
Ret	19	(Argentina) Gabriel Rodrigo	Honda	19	Accident	1	
Ret	76	(Kazakhstan) Makar Yurchenko	KTM	18	Accident	12	
Ret	5	(Spain) Jaume Masiá	KTM	13	Collision	20	
Ret	14	(Italy) Tony Arbolino	Honda	12	Engine	3	
Ret	12	(Czech Republic) Filip Salač	KTM	9	Lost Helmet Visor	31	
Ret	16	(Italy) Andrea Migno	KTM	5	Accident	23	
Ret	61	(Turkey) Can Öncü	KTM	5	Collision Damage	16	
Ret	25	(Spain) Raúl Fernández	KTM	4	Collision	13	
Ret	11	(Spain) Sergio García	Honda	4	Collision	11	
Ret	75	(Spain) Albert Arenas	KTM	4	Collision	6	
Ret	48	(Italy) Lorenzo Dalla Porta	Honda	3	Engine	8	
OFFICIAL MOTO3 REPORT

== Championship standings after the race ==
=== MotoGP ===
Pos.	Rider	Points
1	(Spain) Marc Márquez	140
2	(Italy) Andrea Dovizioso	103
3	(Spain) Álex Rins	101
4	(Italy) Danilo Petrucci	98
5	(Italy) Valentino Rossi	72
6	(Australia) Jack Miller	53
7	(France) Fabio Quartararo	51
8	(Japan) Takaaki Nakagami	48
9	(Spain) Pol Espargaró	47
10	(United Kingdom) Cal Crutchlow	42

=== Moto2 ===
Pos.	Rider	Points
1	(Spain) Álex Márquez	111
2	(Switzerland) Thomas Lüthi	104
3	(Spain) Jorge Navarro	89
4	(Italy) Lorenzo Baldassarri	88
5	(Germany) Marcel Schrötter	73
6	(Italy) Luca Marini	68
7	(Spain) Augusto Fernández	67
8	(Italy) Enea Bastianini	56
9	(South Africa) Brad Binder	44
10	(Australia) Remy Gardner	41

=== Moto3 ===
Pos.	Rider	Points
1	(Spain) Arón Canet	103
2	(Italy) Lorenzo Dalla Porta	80
3	(Italy) Niccolò Antonelli	75
4	(Italy) Celestino Vietti	68
5	(Spain) Jaume Masiá	65
6	(Italy) Tony Arbolino	51
7	(Japan) Kaito Toba	51
8	(Spain) Marcos Ramírez	49
9	(United Kingdom) John McPhee	47
10	(Italy) Andrea Migno	40

== Notes ==
Previous race: 2019 Italian Grand Prix	FIM Grand Prix World Championship; 2019 season	Next race: 2019 Dutch TT
Previous race: 2018 Catalan Grand Prix	Catalan motorcycle Grand Prix	Next race: 2020 Catalan Grand Prix
