= 2018 British motorcycle Grand Prix =

(United Kingdom) 2018 British Grand Prix
Race details
- Race 12 of 19 races in the 2018 Grand Prix motorcycle racing season
- Date: 26 August 2018
- Official name: GoPro British Grand Prix
- Location: Silverstone Circuit, Silverstone, United Kingdom
- Course: Permanent racing facility; 5.900 km (3.666 mi)

MotoGP
Pole position
Rider	(Spain) Jorge Lorenzo	Ducati
Time	2:10.155	

Moto2
Pole position
Rider	(Italy) Francesco Bagnaia	Kalex
Time	2:08.153	

Moto3
Pole position
Rider	(Spain) Jorge Martín	Honda
Time	2:13.292	

The 2018 British motorcycle Grand Prix was the scheduled twelfth round of the 2018 MotoGP season. Planned to be held at the Silverstone Circuit in Silverstone on 26 August 2018, the race was cancelled due to heavy rain. This is the first cancelled MotoGP race since the cancellation of the MotoGP class race during the 2011 Malaysian Grand Prix due to Marco Simoncelli's fatal accident, and also marks for the first time since the 1980 Austrian Grand Prix that racing for all classes was cancelled.

== Qualifying ==
Qualifying was conducted on 25 August 2018, with Jorge Lorenzo on a Ducati taking the MotoGP pole with a time of 2:10.155. Francesco Bagnaia scored the Moto2 pole at 2:08.153, and Jorge Martín in a Honda claimed the Moto3 pole at 2:13.292, all with inclement weather involved.

== Track surface issues ==
On 9 February 2018, Silverstone Circuit announced the track would be repaved in its entirety for the first time since 1996. Shortly after the track was repaved and opened for testing, Cal Crutchlow said the new surface was perfect to Dorna officials.

Five months later, during the Formula One round at Silverstone in early July, Lewis Hamilton blasted the repaving as "wasted money," calling it the "worst job ever," saying the rough surface was worse than the Nürburgring Nordschleife. Carlos Sainz, Jr. said the roughness of the surface, especially bumps, were worse after the repaving.

Shortly after the cancellation, MotoGP officials blamed the track's newly repaved surface as the problem. Media reports from various motorsport sites noted the problems since the F1 race and the new tarmac was to blame.

On 8 May 2019, Silverstone announced as part of extending its MotoGP contract to 2021 that the circuit will be repaved again in June, two months before the MotoGP race. The repaving was completed by Tarmac Ltd with the direction of Italian circuit designer Jarno Zaffelli, from Dromo.

== Championship standings after the race ==
=== MotoGP ===
Pos.	Rider	Points
1	(Spain) Marc Márquez	201
2	(Italy) Valentino Rossi	142
3	(Spain) Jorge Lorenzo	130
4	(Italy) Andrea Dovizioso	129
5	(Spain) Maverick Viñales	113
6	(Italy) Danilo Petrucci	105
7	(France) Johann Zarco	104
8	(United Kingdom) Cal Crutchlow	103
9	(Italy) Andrea Iannone	84
10	(Spain) Álex Rins	66

=== Moto2 ===
Pos.	Rider	Points
1	(Italy) Francesco Bagnaia	189
2	(Portugal) Miguel Oliveira	186
3	(Spain) Álex Márquez	113
4	(South Africa) Brad Binder	111
5	(Italy) Lorenzo Baldassarri	106
6	(Spain) Joan Mir	103
7	(Germany) Marcel Schrötter	91
8	(Spain) Xavi Vierge	90
9	(France) Fabio Quartararo	84
10	(Italy) Mattia Pasini	82

=== Moto3 ===
Pos.	Rider	Points
1	(Italy) Marco Bezzecchi	158
2	(Spain) Jorge Martín	146
3	(Italy) Fabio Di Giannantonio	121
4	(Spain) Arón Canet	118
5	(Italy) Enea Bastianini	117
6	(Argentina) Gabriel Rodrigo	84
7	(Czech Republic) Jakub Kornfeil	80
8	(Spain) Marcos Ramírez	67
9	(Italy) Lorenzo Dalla Porta	63
10	(Italy) Andrea Migno	60

Previous race: 2018 Austrian Grand Prix	FIM Grand Prix World Championship; 2018 season	Next race: 2018 San Marino Grand Prix
Previous race: 2017 British Grand Prix	British motorcycle Grand Prix	Next race: 2019 British Grand Prix
