= Octo Telematics =

International vehicle telematics provider

Octo Group S.p.A.
- Trade name: Octo Telematics
- Type: Private S.p.A.
- Industry: Connected Insurance, Fleet Telematics, Smart Mobility, Smart Cities
- Founded: 2002; 24 years ago
- Founders: Fabio Sbianchi; Giuseppe Zuco
- Headquarters: Rome, Italy
- Number of locations: Rome, London, Boston, Madrid, São Paulo
- Area served: Worldwide
- Key people: Corrado Sciolla (CEO)
- Products: Telematics, IoT, Data Analytics, Cloud Computing
- Website: www.octotelematics.com

Octo Telematics (OCTO) is an Italian multinational technology company that provides telematics and Internet of things (IoT) analytics to the auto insurance industry. This is commonly known as Usage-based insurance (UBI) or pay-as-you-drive insurance. As of 2020, the company was a telematics and data analytics service provider for the car insurance industry. With its analytical services, OCTO also serves the fleet management industry and provides IoT solutions to a number of other markets.

Founded in Italy in 2002, the company is headquartered in Rome, with offices in Boston, London, Madrid, Stuttgart, São Paulo and Shanghai. OCTO's big data set consists of data collected by connected users around the world. Drivers automatically provide data relating to the car, their driving behavior, localization, context, possible accidents, along with other data. This is stored and analyzed based on a combination of thousands of parameters.

Products and services are developed for insurance companies, fleet managers, car manufacturers and shared mobility operators. Governments and cities are also among its customers.

Globally, OCTO has more than 6 million connected users generating 267 billion miles of driving data and 473,000 crashes and insurance related events. Within the shared mobility market, OCTO serves more than 10 car sharing services with more than 400,000 rentals per month.

== History ==
OCTO was established in Italy 2002 and entered the UK and US markets in 2011, followed by Canada in 2014.

The Renova Group, acquired Octo in April 2014, before selling equity to private equity group Pamplona Capital Management in September of that year.

In December 2016, OCTO acquired the Mobility Solutions business of Tecnologienelle Retienei Sistemi T.R.S. S.p.A.

OCTO forms a strategic alliance with Willis Towers Watson in October 2017, and acquired their UBI assets, including DriveAbility and DriveAbility Marketplace.

In August 2018, OCTO invested in UK based company, Nebula Systems. More recently at the end of 2019, OCTO acquired the entire share capital of Nebula Systems Ltd.

OCTO entered a technical partnership with electric bike manufacturer Energica in September 2019.

== Products and services ==
OCTO develops products and services that operate with a wide range of devices (including smartphones, Black-Boxes and OBD), vehicles (including, cars, trucks, motorbikes and bicycles), pets and consumer segments. These are then integrated with their partners' IT systems and business processes.

A partnership between OCTO and Telecom Italia (TIM) to develop data-driven services for vehicles not yet connected to the mobile network was formed in December 2019. The first product launched from the partnership was the TIM BabyPad, a device to detect whether a child is in their car seat and make sure they are not left unattended.

In May 2020, OCTO launched two new IoT products in response to the COVID-19 pandemic. Both designed to support the recovery back to normal life, OCTO AroundMe is a Bluetooth solution for distancing and OCTO PurePlace is a sanitation solution based on nanotechnology developed by NASA.

== Trademarks ==
- DriveAbility is based on actuarial science, it offers scoring through a combination of different behavioral and environmental elements with the goal of reducing risk.
- Mobility Atlas analyzes vehicle flow, for both incoming and outgoing traffic, within a specific geographic area. It considers cars as mobility sensors and is designed to supporting planning and operational activities conducted by cities, government authorities, utilities and mobility operators.

== Sponsorship ==
- At the Mugello GP in 2015, OCTO became the title sponsor of Pramac Racing, renaming the number two Ducati team to OCTO Pramac Racing.
- OCTO telematics became title sponsor on the British round of the MotoGP in 2015.
- In 2018 and 2019 OCTO was title sponsor of the San Marino MotoGP.
- In 2019, the launch year of the full electric bike racing championship MotoE, OCTO was the title sponsor of the MotoE Pramac Racing Team.
- OCTO was the 2019 title sponsor of the OCTO Bridgestone Cup “Di.Di.”, the disabled motorbike championship.
