= 2018 Moto2 World Championship =

9th running of the Moto2 World Championship

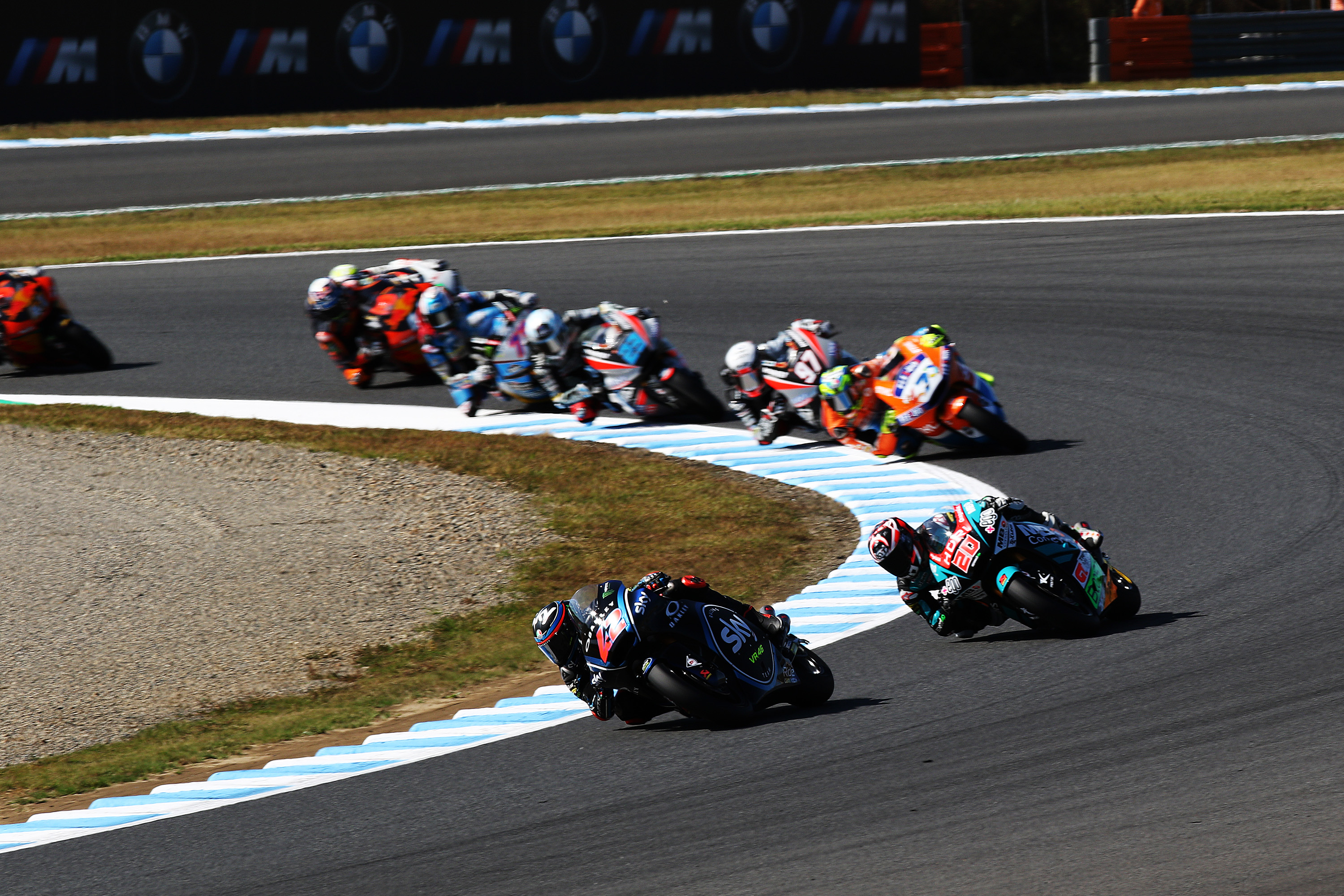
Francesco Bagnaia was the 2018 Moto2 World Riders' Champion.

The 2018 FIM Moto2 World Championship was the intermediate class of the 70th Fédération Internationale de Motocyclisme (FIM) Road Racing World Championship season. Franco Morbidelli was the reigning series champion, but he did not defend his title as he moved to the MotoGP class.

2018 was the final season that the Honda CBR600RR inline-4 engine package — which debuted in the 2010 Moto2 season — was used in competition; as a brand new engine package (765cc inline-3) supplied by Triumph Motorcycles was introduced for the 2019 season.

After finishing 3rd at Sepang, Italian rider Francesco Bagnaia became the 2018 Moto2 World Champion. Miguel Oliveira finished second in the championship and his teammate Brad Binder finished third.

== Teams and riders ==
Team	Constructor	Motorcycle	No.	Rider	Rounds
(Indonesia) Astra Honda Racing Team	Honda (Note: Technically a Kalex chassis, but entered as a Honda bike according to the official entry list and results.)	Moto2	30	(Indonesia) Dimas Ekky Pratama	7
(Spain) AGR Team	Kalex	Moto2	57	(Spain) Edgar Pons	7, 14
(Germany) Dynavolt Intact GP	Kalex	Moto2	23	(Germany) Marcel Schrötter	All
(Germany) Dynavolt Intact GP	Kalex	Moto2	97	(Spain) Xavi Vierge	All
(Belgium) EG 0,0 Marc VDS	Kalex	Moto2	36	(Spain) Joan Mir	All
(Belgium) EG 0,0 Marc VDS	Kalex	Moto2	73	(Spain) Álex Márquez	All
(Italy) Federal Oil Gresini Moto2	Kalex	Moto2	9	(Spain) Jorge Navarro	All
(Japan) Idemitsu Honda Team Asia	Kalex	Moto2	45	(Japan) Tetsuta Nagashima	All
(Japan) Idemitsu Honda Team Asia	Kalex	Moto2	89	(Malaysia) Khairul Idham Pawi	All
(Italy) Italtrans Racing Team	Kalex	Moto2	5	(Italy) Andrea Locatelli	All
(Italy) Italtrans Racing Team	Kalex	Moto2	54	(Italy) Mattia Pasini	All
(Italy) Marinelli Snipers Team	Kalex	Moto2	13	(Italy) Romano Fenati	1–13
(Italy) Marinelli Snipers Team	Kalex	Moto2	18	(Andorra) Xavier Cardelús	14–19
(Spain) Pons HP40	Kalex	Moto2	7	(Italy) Lorenzo Baldassarri	All
(Spain) Pons HP40	Kalex	Moto2	40	(Spain) Héctor Barberá	1–6
(Spain) Pons HP40	Kalex	Moto2	40	(Spain) Augusto Fernández	7–19
(Spain) Team Stylobike	Kalex	Moto2	18	(Andorra) Xavier Cardelús	4–6, 8–13
(Spain) SAG Team (Spain) Nashi Argan SAG Team (Spain) Temporary Lavorint SAG Team	Kalex	Moto2	32	(Spain) Isaac Viñales	1–9
(Spain) SAG Team (Spain) Nashi Argan SAG Team (Spain) Temporary Lavorint SAG Team	Kalex	Moto2	55	(Spain) Alejandro Medina	10–12
(Spain) SAG Team (Spain) Nashi Argan SAG Team (Spain) Temporary Lavorint SAG Team	Kalex	Moto2	2	(Switzerland) Jesko Raffin	13–14, 16–19
(Spain) SAG Team (Spain) Nashi Argan SAG Team (Spain) Temporary Lavorint SAG Team	Kalex	Moto2	99	(Thailand) Thitipong Warokorn	15
(Spain) SAG Team (Spain) Nashi Argan SAG Team (Spain) Temporary Lavorint SAG Team	Kalex	Moto2	95	(France) Jules Danilo	All
(Malaysia) SIC Racing Team (Malaysia) Petronas Sprinta Racing	Kalex	Moto2	63	(Malaysia) Zulfahmi Khairuddin	1–4
(Malaysia) SIC Racing Team (Malaysia) Petronas Sprinta Racing	Kalex	Moto2	66	(Finland) Niki Tuuli	5–19
(Italy) Sky Racing Team VR46	Kalex	Moto2	10	(Italy) Luca Marini	All
(Italy) Sky Racing Team VR46	Kalex	Moto2	42	(Italy) Francesco Bagnaia	All
(Italy) Tasca Racing Scuderia Moto2	Kalex	Moto2	21	(Italy) Federico Fuligni	1–9, 11–19
(Italy) Tasca Racing Scuderia Moto2	Kalex	Moto2	24	(Italy) Simone Corsi	All
(United Kingdom) Tickhill Labour and Plant	Kalex	Moto2	65	(United Kingdom) Josh Owens	12
(Czech Republic) Willi Race Racing Team	Kalex	Moto2	12	(South Africa) Sheridan Morais	10, 13–14
(Germany) Kiefer Racing	KTM	Moto2	77	(Switzerland) Dominique Aegerter	1–3, 6–19
(Germany) Kiefer Racing	KTM	Moto2	3	(Germany) Lukas Tulovic	4–5
(Finland) Red Bull KTM Ajo	KTM	Moto2	41	(South Africa) Brad Binder	All
(Finland) Red Bull KTM Ajo	KTM	Moto2	44	(Portugal) Miguel Oliveira	All
(Switzerland) Swiss Innovative Investors	KTM	Moto2	22	(United Kingdom) Sam Lowes	All
(Switzerland) Swiss Innovative Investors	KTM	Moto2	27	(Spain) Iker Lecuona	All
(Netherlands) NTS RW Racing GP	NTS	NH6	4	(South Africa) Steven Odendaal	All
(Netherlands) NTS RW Racing GP	NTS	NH6	16	(United States) Joe Roberts	All
(Italy) Beta Tools - Speed Up (Italy) MB Conveyors - Speed Up (Italy) HDR Heidrun - Speed Up (Italy) Lightech - Speed Up (Italy) Boost - Speed Up (Italy) (+)Ego - Speed Up	Speed Up	SF8	20	(France) Fabio Quartararo	All
(Italy) Beta Tools - Speed Up (Italy) MB Conveyors - Speed Up (Italy) HDR Heidrun - Speed Up (Italy) Lightech - Speed Up (Italy) Boost - Speed Up (Italy) (+)Ego - Speed Up	Speed Up	SF8	52	(United Kingdom) Danny Kent	1–14
(Italy) Beta Tools - Speed Up (Italy) MB Conveyors - Speed Up (Italy) HDR Heidrun - Speed Up (Italy) Lightech - Speed Up (Italy) Boost - Speed Up (Italy) (+)Ego - Speed Up	Speed Up	SF8	57	(Spain) Edgar Pons	15–18
(Italy) Beta Tools - Speed Up (Italy) MB Conveyors - Speed Up (Italy) HDR Heidrun - Speed Up (Italy) Lightech - Speed Up (Italy) Boost - Speed Up (Italy) (+)Ego - Speed Up	Speed Up	SF8	70	(Italy) Tommaso Marcon	19
(Switzerland) Forward Racing Team	Suter	MMX2	51	(Brazil) Eric Granado	1–10
(Switzerland) Forward Racing Team	Suter	MMX2	32	(Spain) Isaac Viñales	11–19
(Switzerland) Forward Racing Team	Suter	MMX2	62	(Italy) Stefano Manzi	1–17
(Switzerland) Forward Racing Team	Suter	MMX2	50	(Indonesia) Rafid Topan Sucipto	18
(Switzerland) Forward Racing Team	Suter	MMX2	3	(Germany) Lukas Tulovic	19
(France) Tech 3 Racing	Tech 3	Mistral 610	64	(Netherlands) Bo Bendsneyder	1–16
(France) Tech 3 Racing	Tech 3	Mistral 610	67	(Australia) Bryan Staring	17
(France) Tech 3 Racing	Tech 3	Mistral 610	30	(Indonesia) Dimas Ekky Pratama	18
(France) Tech 3 Racing	Tech 3	Mistral 610	14	(Spain) Héctor Garzó	19
(France) Tech 3 Racing	Tech 3	Mistral 610	87	(Australia) Remy Gardner	1–3, 7–19
(France) Tech 3 Racing	Tech 3	Mistral 610	14	(Spain) Héctor Garzó	4–6
(France) Yohan Moto Sport	Tech 3	Mistral 610	80	(France) Cédric Tangre	5
(France) Promoto Sport With GMT94	TransFIORmers	???	19	(France) Corentin Perolari	5

Key
Regular rider
Replacement rider
Wildcard rider

All the bikes used series-specified Dunlop tyres and Honda 600cc 4-cylinder engine.

=== Team changes ===
- NTS made their full season debut in Moto2, having previously competed as a wildcard constructor between the 2014 and 2017 seasons. They fielded bikes for RW Racing GP, who switched manufacturer from Kalex to NTS. RW Racing GP also expanded its operation to field two bikes for the 2018 season.
- Forward Racing Team and Dynavolt Intact GP switched manufacturers. Forward returned to Suter, with which they last competed in 2012, while Intact GP returned to Kalex after one season with Suter.
- Tasca Racing Scuderia Moto2 expanded to two bikes in 2018.
- Both CGBM Evolution and Kiefer Racing switched manufacturers from Kalex and Suter to KTM.
- Marinelli Rivacold Snipers expanded to Moto2, fielding a Kalex bike.
- AGR Team folded its operations in both Moto2 and Moto3 following the 2017 Aragon GP due to financial issues coupled with poor performance throughout the 2017 season.
- Petronas and the Sepang International Circuit formed a partnership which enabled the SIC Racing Team to return to Moto2, having previously competed in the championship in 2014 as "Caterham Moto Racing Team".
- Kiefer Racing downsized to one bike in 2018 due to financial issues. Sandro Cortese, who was originally contracted to ride the team's second bike, was later released as a result.

=== Rider changes ===
- Sam Lowes returned to Moto2 after a season with Aprilia Racing Team Gresini in MotoGP. Lowes previously raced in Moto2 from 2014 to 2016. He joined Swiss Innovative Investors, replacing the spot vacated by Thomas Lüthi who moved up to MotoGP with EG 0,0 Marc VDS.
- 2017 Moto3 champion Joan Mir moved up to Moto2 with EG 0,0 Marc VDS, filling the spot vacated by reigning Moto2 champion Franco Morbidelli who moved up to MotoGP.
- Romano Fenati moved up to Moto2 along with his Moto3 team Marinelli Rivacold Snipers for the 2018 season.
- Xavi Vierge switched team from Tech 3 to Dynavolt Intact GP, replacing Sandro Cortese who left Moto2 for Supersport World Championship. Bo Bendsneyder moved up to Moto2 to fill his spot in Tech 3.
- Luca Marini and Stefano Manzi swapped teams for the 2018 season, with Marini joining his half-brother Valentino Rossi's team Sky Racing Team VR46 while Manzi joins Forward Racing for the 2018 season.
- Héctor Barberá returned to the intermediate class to join Pons HP40 along with Lorenzo Baldassarri, who switched team from Forward to Pons. Barbera previously competed with Pons Racing in the 2009 250cc season.
- Joe Roberts joined NTS RW Racing GP after AGR Team folded near the end of the 2017 season. He joined by Steven Odendaal, who returned to the series after he last competed full-time in Moto2 in 2013.
- Federico Fuligni made his Moto2 full-time debut with Tasca Racing Scuderia Moto2, replacing Xavier Siméon who moved up to MotoGP with Avintia Racing.
- Danny Kent made his full-time Moto2 return in 2018 after leaving Kiefer Racing early in the 2017 season, joining Speed Up Racing as a replacement for Simone Corsi who switched team to Tasca Racing Scuderia Moto2.
- Tetsuta Nagashima switched team to Idemitsu Honda Team Asia, replacing Takaaki Nakagami who moved up to MotoGP to join LCR Honda in 2018.
- Axel Pons moved up to MotoGP as a factory test rider.
- Fabio Quartararo joined Speed Up Racing, replacing Augusto Fernández.
- Jules Danilo moved up to Moto2 with SAG Team as a teammate to Isaac Viñales.
- 2017 CEV Moto2 winner Eric Granado returned to Moto2, joining Forward Racing as a replacement for Lorenzo Baldassarri. Granado previously made some Moto2 appearances in the 2012 season.
- Zulfahmi Khairuddin moved from World Supersport to Moto2, rejoining the SIC Racing Team, who he previously rode for in Moto3 in 2015. He replaced the previously announced new signing Hafizh Syahrin, who moved up to MotoGP with Tech 3 to replace Jonas Folger.

==== Mid-season changes ====
- Dominique Aegerter missed both the Spanish Grand Prix and the French Grand Prix due to an Enduro crash in which he broke his pelvis. He was replaced by the German Lukas Tulovic who made his World Championship début.
- Remy Gardner missed the races at Jerez, Le Mans, and Mugello due to injury, breaking both his legs and his ankle, he was replaced by the Spaniard Héctor Garzó.
- Zulfahmi Khairuddin left SIC Racing Team after the Jerez Grand Prix due to bad results. He was replaced by Niki Tuuli from the French Grand Prix onwards, who left the Supersport World Championship to join SIC Racing Team for the remainder of the season.
- Héctor Barberá left Pons HP40 after his contract was terminated by mutual agreement due to drunk driving. He was replaced by Augusto Fernández for the remainder of the season.
- Eric Granado left Forward Racing after the Czech Republic motorcycle Grand Prix. He was replaced by Isaac Viñales from the Austrian Grand Prix onwards, who left the SAG Team to join Forward Racing for the remainder of the season.
- At the San Marino Grand Prix, Romano Fenati received a 2-race ban following a very controversial incident where Fenati grabbed Stefano Manzi's brake lever at speed in retaliation for Manzi pushing him wide earlier during the race. The following day, Marinelli Rivacold Snipers announced that they terminated Fenati's contract as a result of the incident. Xavier Cardelús would replace Fenati in the team for the remainder of the season.
- Danny Kent was fired from Speed Up Racing after the Aragon Grand Prix due to ongoing bad results. Edgar Pons would become his replacement for the remainder of the season.
- Bo Bendsneyder suffered a broken tibia at the Japanese Grand Prix, and he was replaced by Bryan Staring in Phillip Island, Dimas Ekky Pratama in Sepang, and Héctor Garzó in Valencia.

== Calendar ==
The following Grands Prix were scheduled to take place in 2018:

Round	Date	Grand Prix	Circuit
1	18 March (Note: Night race)	Grand Prix of Qatar	Lusail International Circuit, Lusail
2	8 April	Gran Premio Motul de la República Argentina	Autódromo Termas de Río Hondo, Termas de Río Hondo
3	22 April	(United States) Red Bull Grand Prix of the Americas	Circuit of the Americas, Austin
4	6 May	(Spain) Gran Premio Red Bull de España	Circuito de Jerez, Jerez de la Frontera
5	20 May	HJC Helmets Grand Prix de France	Bugatti Circuit, Le Mans
6	3 June	(Italy) Gran Premio d'Italia Oakley	Mugello Circuit, Scarperia e San Piero
7	17 June	(Catalonia) Gran Premi Monster Energy de Catalunya	Circuit de Barcelona-Catalunya, Montmeló
8	1 July	(Netherlands) Motul TT Assen	TT Circuit Assen, Assen
9	15 July	(Germany) Pramac Motorrad Grand Prix Deutschland	Sachsenring, Hohenstein-Ernstthal
10	5 August	(Czech Republic) Monster Energy Grand Prix České republiky	Brno Circuit, Brno
11	12 August	(Austria) Eyetime Motorrad Grand Prix von Österreich	Red Bull Ring, Spielberg
12	26 August	(United Kingdom) GoPro British Grand Prix	Silverstone Circuit, Silverstone
13	9 September	Gran Premio Octo di San Marino e della Riviera di Rimini	Misano World Circuit, Misano Adriatico
14	23 September	(Aragon) Gran Premio Movistar de Aragón	MotorLand Aragón, Alcañiz
15	7 October	PTT Thailand Grand Prix	Buriram International Circuit, Buriram
16	21 October	Motul Grand Prix of Japan	Motegi Circuit, Motegi
17	28 October	(Australia) Michelin Australian Motorcycle Grand Prix	Phillip Island Grand Prix Circuit, Phillip Island
18	4 November	Shell Malaysia Motorcycle Grand Prix	Sepang International Circuit, Sepang
19	18 November	(Valencian Community) Gran Premio Motul de la Comunitat Valenciana	Circuit Ricardo Tormo, Valencia

=== Calendar changes ===
Comparison between the configuration of the Circuit de Barcelona-Catalunya used in 2016 and 2017 (top), and the layout used starting 2018 (bottom).
- The British Grand Prix was scheduled to move from Silverstone to the new Circuit of Wales, but construction on the new track has not commenced. The two circuits reached a deal that will see Silverstone with an option to host the 2018 race.
- The Thailand Grand Prix is a new addition to the calendar, with the race scheduled for 7 October.
- The Catalan Grand Prix used a new configuration of the Circuit de Barcelona-Catalunya, wherein the previous set of corners of turns 13, 14 and 15 was combined into a sweeping right corner. The new layout was previously used in Formula 1 from 2004 to 2006.

== Results and standings ==
=== Grands Prix ===
Round	Grand Prix	Pole position	Fastest lap	Winning rider	Winning team	Winning constructor	Report
1	Qatar motorcycle Grand Prix	(Spain) Álex Márquez	(Italy) Lorenzo Baldassarri	(Italy) Francesco Bagnaia	(Italy) Sky Racing Team VR46	(Germany) Kalex	Report
2	(Argentina) Argentine Republic motorcycle Grand Prix	(Spain) Xavi Vierge	(Spain) Xavi Vierge	(Italy) Mattia Pasini	(Italy) Italtrans Racing Team	(Germany) Kalex	Report
3	(United States) Motorcycle Grand Prix of the Americas	(Spain) Álex Márquez	(Italy) Francesco Bagnaia	(Italy) Francesco Bagnaia	(Italy) Sky Racing Team VR46	(Germany) Kalex	Report
4	(Spain) Spanish motorcycle Grand Prix	(Italy) Lorenzo Baldassarri	(Italy) Lorenzo Baldassarri	(Italy) Lorenzo Baldassarri	(Spain) Pons HP40	(Germany) Kalex	Report
5	(France) French motorcycle Grand Prix	(Italy) Francesco Bagnaia	(Italy) Lorenzo Baldassarri	(Italy) Francesco Bagnaia	(Italy) Sky Racing Team VR46	(Germany) Kalex	Report
6	(Italy) Italian motorcycle Grand Prix	(Italy) Mattia Pasini	(Portugal) Miguel Oliveira	(Portugal) Miguel Oliveira	(Finland) Red Bull KTM Ajo	(Austria) KTM	Report
7	(Catalonia) Catalan motorcycle Grand Prix	(France) Fabio Quartararo	(France) Fabio Quartararo	(France) Fabio Quartararo	(Italy) HDR - Speed Up Racing	(Italy) Speed Up	Report
8	(Netherlands) Dutch TT	(Italy) Francesco Bagnaia	(Italy) Lorenzo Baldassarri	(Italy) Francesco Bagnaia	(Italy) Sky Racing Team VR46	(Germany) Kalex	Report
9	(Germany) German motorcycle Grand Prix	(Italy) Mattia Pasini	(Spain) Joan Mir	(South Africa) Brad Binder	(Finland) Red Bull KTM Ajo	(Austria) KTM	Report
10	Czech Republic motorcycle Grand Prix	(Italy) Luca Marini	(Spain) Xavi Vierge	(Portugal) Miguel Oliveira	(Finland) Red Bull KTM Ajo	(Austria) KTM	Report
11	(Austria) Austrian motorcycle Grand Prix	(Italy) Francesco Bagnaia	(South Africa) Brad Binder	(Italy) Francesco Bagnaia	(Italy) Sky Racing Team VR46	(Germany) Kalex	Report
12	(United Kingdom) British motorcycle Grand Prix	(Italy) Francesco Bagnaia	Race cancelled (Note: All racing at Silverstone was cancelled due to sustained heavy rain and unsafe track conditions.)				Report
13	San Marino and Rimini Riviera motorcycle Grand Prix	(Italy) Francesco Bagnaia	(Italy) Mattia Pasini	(Italy) Francesco Bagnaia	(Italy) Sky Racing Team VR46	(Germany) Kalex	Report
14	Aragon motorcycle Grand Prix	(South Africa) Brad Binder	(Spain) Álex Márquez	(South Africa) Brad Binder	(Finland) Red Bull KTM Ajo	(Austria) KTM	Report
15	Thailand motorcycle Grand Prix	(Italy) Lorenzo Baldassarri	(Italy) Francesco Bagnaia	(Italy) Francesco Bagnaia	(Italy) Sky Racing Team VR46	(Germany) Kalex	Report
16	(Japan) Japanese motorcycle Grand Prix	(Italy) Francesco Bagnaia	(Italy) Francesco Bagnaia	(Italy) Francesco Bagnaia (Note: Fabio Quartararo originally finished 1st, but was disqualified due to a technical infringement.)	(Italy) Sky Racing Team VR46	(Germany) Kalex	Report
17	(Australia) Australian motorcycle Grand Prix	(Italy) Mattia Pasini	(Spain) Augusto Fernández	(South Africa) Brad Binder	(Finland) Red Bull KTM Ajo	(Austria) KTM	Report
18	(Malaysia) Malaysian motorcycle Grand Prix	(Spain) Álex Márquez	(Italy) Luca Marini	(Italy) Luca Marini	(Italy) Sky Racing Team VR46	(Germany) Kalex	Report
19	Valencian Community motorcycle Grand Prix	(Italy) Luca Marini	(Spain) Álex Márquez	(Portugal) Miguel Oliveira	(Finland) Red Bull KTM Ajo	(Austria) KTM	Report

=== Riders' standings ===
Scoring system

Points were awarded to the top fifteen finishers. A rider had to finish the race to earn points.

Position	1st	2nd	3rd	4th	5th	6th	7th	8th	9th	10th	11th	12th	13th	14th	15th
Points	25	20	16	13	11	10	9	8	7	6	5	4	3	2	1

Pos.	Rider	Bike	Team	QAT (Qatar)	ARG (Argentina)	AME (United States)	SPA (Spain)	FRA (France)	ITA (Italy)	CAT (Catalonia)	NED (Netherlands)	GER (Germany)	CZE (Czech Republic)	AUT (Austria)	GBR (United Kingdom)	RSM (San Marino)	ARA (Aragon)	THA (Thailand)	JPN (Japan)	AUS (Australia)	MAL (Malaysia)	VAL (Valencian Community)	Pts
1	(Italy) Francesco Bagnaia	Kalex	Sky Racing Team VR46	1	9	1^{F}	3	1^{P}	4	8	1^{P}	12	3	1^{P}	C^{P}	1^{P}	2	1^{F}	1^{P F}	12	3	14	306
2	(Portugal) Miguel Oliveira	KTM	Red Bull KTM Ajo	5	3	3	2	6	1^{F}	2	6	4	1	2	C	2	7	3	3	11	2	1	297
3	(South Africa) Brad Binder	KTM	Red Bull KTM Ajo	6	Ret	6	6	9	6	6	7	1	6	6^{F}	C	8	1^{P}	4	5	1	8	Ret	201
4	(Spain) Álex Márquez	Kalex	EG 0,0 Marc VDS	3^{P}	5	2^{P}	Ret	2	5	3	3	13	Ret	Ret	C	18	4^{F}	Ret	4	7	7^{P}	3^{F}	173
5	(Italy) Lorenzo Baldassarri	Kalex	Pons HP40	2^{F}	4	10	1^{P F}	Ret^{F}	2	7	26^{F}	Ret	4	26	C	6	3	Ret^{P}	2	22	6	Ret	162
6	(Spain) Joan Mir	Kalex	EG 0,0 Marc VDS	11	7	4	11	3	3	Ret	5	2^{F}	Ret	8	C	5	6	Ret	11	2	10	Ret	155
7	(Italy) Luca Marini	Kalex	Sky Racing Team VR46	9	16	13	Ret	Ret	7	17	8	3	2^{P}	3	C	Ret	11	2	9	5	1^{F}	Ret^{P}	147
8	(Germany) Marcel Schrötter	Kalex	Dynavolt Intact GP	7	10	Ret	7	4	Ret	4	4	6	7	7	C	3	5	Ret	10	9	9	7	147
9	(Italy) Mattia Pasini	Kalex	Italtrans Racing Team	4	1	7	5	18	Ret^{P}	Ret	11	Ret^{P}	10	4	C	4^{F}	8	6	14	Ret^{P}	4	4	141
10	(France) Fabio Quartararo	Speed Up	HDR Heidrun - Speed Up	20	22	15	10	8	11	1^{P F}	2	9	11	9	C	7	9	5	DSQ	10	5	6	138
11	(Spain) Xavi Vierge	Kalex	Dynavolt Intact GP	8	2^{P F}	Ret	4	5	9	5	Ret	7	5^{F}	DNS	C	10	Ret	11	7	3	11	Ret	131
12	(Spain) Iker Lecuona	KTM	Swiss Innovative Investors	Ret	11	5	9	Ret	13	10	16	19	13	10	C	19	14	7	8	Ret	Ret	2	80
13	(Spain) Jorge Navarro	Kalex	Federal Oil Gresini Moto2	10	Ret	8	17	Ret	Ret	Ret	13	10	8	5	C	9	10	17	Ret	Ret	13	Ret	58
14	(Italy) Simone Corsi	Kalex	Tasca Racing Scuderia Moto2	14	23	12	12	14	10	12	15	8	15	Ret	C	11	12	10	Ret	19	16	10	53
15	(Italy) Andrea Locatelli	Kalex	Italtrans Racing Team	19	15	14	15	12	8	11	10	Ret	14	13	C	14	16	9	16	20	12	9	52
16	(United Kingdom) Sam Lowes	KTM	Swiss Innovative Investors	Ret	13	24	8	13	Ret	9	9	5	9	Ret	C	Ret	20	Ret	17	14	15	Ret	49
17	(Switzerland) Dominique Aegerter	KTM	Kiefer Racing	15	8	9			12	20	14	14	17	17	C	13	21	16	13	6	14	11	47
18	(Spain) Augusto Fernández	Kalex	Pons HP40							14	12	15	12	Ret	C	Ret	13	Ret	6	4^{F}	Ret	8	45
19	(Australia) Remy Gardner	Tech 3	Tech 3 Racing	12	6	17				15	18	11	Ret	Ret	C	12	19	12	15	Ret	Ret	5	40
20	(Japan) Tetsuta Nagashima	Kalex	Idemitsu Honda Team Asia	21	17	19	13	25	Ret	13	DNS	Ret	16	15	C	Ret	15	8	12	13	Ret	12	27
21	(Italy) Romano Fenati	Kalex	Marinelli Snipers Team	24	19	16	Ret	7	Ret	Ret	Ret	16	Ret	11	C	DSQ							14
22	(Switzerland) Jesko Raffin	Kalex	SAG Team													15	23		20	8	19	15	10
23	(Spain) Héctor Barberá	Kalex	Pons HP40	13	20	18	14	11	Ret														10
24	(Italy) Stefano Manzi	Suter	Forward Racing Team	26	21	Ret	Ret	10	Ret	Ret	Ret	25	Ret	14	C	Ret	Ret	Ret	24	DNS			8
25	(United Kingdom) Danny Kent	Speed Up	MB Conveyors - Speed Up	17	12	Ret	Ret	21	Ret	21	Ret	Ret	Ret	12	C	Ret	Ret						8
26	(Spain) Isaac Viñales	Kalex	SAG Team	16	14	11	19	Ret	16	Ret	22	Ret											7
26	(Spain) Isaac Viñales	Suter	Forward Racing Team											23	C	DNS	DNS	24	26	Ret	24	16	7
27	(United States) Joe Roberts	NTS	NTS RW Racing GP	25	25	23	Ret	19	14	22	21	22	18	19	C	16	24	13	18	18	18	Ret	5
28	(South Africa) Steven Odendaal	NTS	NTS RW Racing GP	22	18	21	Ret	17	15	18	20	18	19	18	C	17	18	23	19	17	21	13	4
29	(Netherlands) Bo Bendsneyder	Tech 3	Tech 3 Racing	18	28	20	16	16	Ret	Ret	17	20	Ret	22	C	20	25	14	Ret				2
30	(Malaysia) Khairul Idham Pawi	Kalex	Idemitsu Honda Team Asia	23	24	25	18	15	18	19	19	17	20	16	C	22	27	21	22	16	17	Ret	1
31	(Spain) Edgar Pons	Kalex	AGR Team							16							17						1
31	(Spain) Edgar Pons	Speed Up	MB Conveyors - Speed Up															19	23	15	20		1
32	(Finland) Niki Tuuli	Kalex	Petronas Sprinta Racing					22	17	Ret	DNS	DNS	21	21	C	21	22	15	21	DNS	Ret	Ret	1
33	(Andorra) Xavier Cardelús	Kalex	Team Stylobike				22	26	22		DNS	24	Ret	25	C	25							0
33	(Andorra) Xavier Cardelús	Kalex	Marinelli Snipers Team														28	22	27	Ret	Ret	17	0
34	(France) Jules Danilo	Kalex	Nashi Argan SAG Team	27	Ret	26	24	20	Ret	23	23	DNS	22	20	C	23	26	20	25	Ret	22	18	0
35	(Thailand) Thitipong Warokorn	Kalex	SAG Team															18					0
36	(Italy) Federico Fuligni	Kalex	Tasca Racing Scuderia Moto2	29	27	28	21	Ret	21	Ret	25	23		Ret	C	24	Ret	25	Ret	Ret	25	19	0
37	(Brazil) Eric Granado	Suter	Forward Racing Team	30	29	22	Ret	Ret	19	25	24	21	23										0
38	(Germany) Lukas Tulovic	KTM	Kiefer Racing				20	23															0
38	(Germany) Lukas Tulovic	Suter	Forward Racing Team																			20	0
39	(Spain) Héctor Garzó	Tech 3	Tech 3 Racing				23	Ret	20													DNS	0
40	(Australia) Bryan Staring	Tech 3	Tech 3 Racing																	21			0
41	(Indonesia) Dimas Ekky Pratama	Honda	Astra Honda Racing Team							24													0
41	(Indonesia) Dimas Ekky Pratama	Tech 3	Tech 3 Racing																		23		0
42	(Spain) Alejandro Medina	Kalex	SAG Team										Ret	24	C								0
43	(South Africa) Sheridan Morais	Kalex	Willi Race Racing Team										24			Ret	Ret						0
44	(France) Corentin Perolari	TransFIORmers	Promoto Sport With GMT94					24															0
45	(Malaysia) Zulfahmi Khairuddin	Kalex	SIC Racing Team	28	26	27	Ret																0
46	(Indonesia) Rafid Topan Sucipto	Suter	Forward Racing Team																		26		0
47	(France) Cédric Tangre	Tech 3	Tech 3 Racing					27															0
	(Italy) Tommaso Marcon	Speed Up	HDR Heidrun - Speed Up																			Ret	0
	(United Kingdom) Josh Owens	Kalex	Tickhill Labour and Plant												C								0
Pos.	Rider	Bike	Team	QAT (Qatar)	ARG (Argentina)	AME (United States)	SPA (Spain)	FRA (France)	ITA (Italy)	CAT (Catalonia)	NED (Netherlands)	GER (Germany)	CZE (Czech Republic)	AUT (Austria)	GBR (United Kingdom)	RSM (San Marino)	ARA (Aragon)	THA (Thailand)	JPN (Japan)	AUS (Australia)	MAL (Malaysia)	VAL (Valencian Community)	Pts

Race key
Colour	Result
Gold	Winner
Silver	2nd place
Bronze	3rd place
Green	Points finish
Blue	Non-points finish
Blue	Non-classified finish (NC)
Purple	Retired (Ret)
Red	Did not qualify (DNQ)
Black	Disqualified (DSQ)
White	Did not start (DNS)
White	Withdrew (WD)
White	Race cancelled (C)
Blank	Did not practice (DNP)
Blank	Excluded (EX)
Blank	Did not arrive (DNA)
Blank	Did not enter (empty cell)
Annotation	Meaning
P	Pole position
F	Fastest lap
Rider key
Colour	Meaning
Light blue	Rookie rider

=== Constructors' standings ===
Each constructor received the same number of points as their best placed rider in each race.

Pos.	Constructor	QAT (Qatar)	ARG (Argentina)	AME (United States)	SPA (Spain)	FRA (France)	ITA (Italy)	CAT (Catalonia)	NED (Netherlands)	GER (Germany)	CZE (Czech Republic)	AUT (Austria)	GBR (United Kingdom)	RSM (San Marino)	ARA (Aragon)	THA (Thailand)	JPN (Japan)	AUS (Australia)	MAL (Malaysia)	VAL (Valencian Community)	Pts
1	(Germany) Kalex	1	1	1	1	1	2	3	1	2	2	1	C	1	2	1	1	2	1	3	407
2	(Austria) KTM	5	3	3	2	6	1	2	6	1	1	2	C	2	1	3	3	1	2	1	345
3	(Italy) Speed Up	17	12	15	10	8	11	1	2	9	11	9	C	7	9	5	23	10	5	6	142
4	(France) Tech 3	12	6	17	16	16	20	15	17	11	Ret	22	C	12	19	12	15	21	23	5	40
5	(Switzerland) Suter	26	21	22	Ret	10	19	25	24	21	23	14	C	Ret	Ret	24	24	Ret	24	16	8
6	(Japan) NTS	22	18	21	Ret	17	14	18	20	18	18	18	C	16	18	13	18	17	18	13	8
	(France) TransFIORmers					24															0
	(Japan) Honda							24													0
Pos.	Constructor	QAT (Qatar)	ARG (Argentina)	AME (United States)	SPA (Spain)	FRA (France)	ITA (Italy)	CAT (Catalonia)	NED (Netherlands)	GER (Germany)	CZE (Czech Republic)	AUT (Austria)	GBR (United Kingdom)	RSM (San Marino)	ARA (Aragon)	THA (Thailand)	JPN (Japan)	AUS (Australia)	MAL (Malaysia)	VAL (Valencian Community)	Pts

=== Teams' standings ===
The teams' standings were based on results obtained by regular and substitute riders; wild-card entries were ineligible.

Pos.	Team	Bike No.	QAT (Qatar)	ARG (Argentina)	AME (United States)	SPA (Spain)	FRA (France)	ITA (Italy)	CAT (Catalonia)	NED (Netherlands)	GER (Germany)	CZE (Czech Republic)	AUT (Austria)	GBR (United Kingdom)	RSM (San Marino)	ARA (Aragon)	THA (Thailand)	JPN (Japan)	AUS (Australia)	MAL (Malaysia)	VAL (Valencian Community)	Pts
1	(Finland) Red Bull KTM Ajo	41	6	Ret	6	6	9	6	6	7	1	6	6^{F}	C	8	1^{P}	4	5	1	8	Ret	498
1	(Finland) Red Bull KTM Ajo	44	5	3	3	2	6	1^{F}	2	6	4	1	2	C	2	7	3	3	11	2	1	498
2	(Italy) Sky Racing Team VR46	10	9	16	13	Ret	Ret	7	17	8	3	2^{P}	3	C	Ret	11	2	9	5	1^{F}	Ret^{P}	453
2	(Italy) Sky Racing Team VR46	42	1	9	1^{F}	3	1^{P}	4	8	1^{P}	12	3	1^{P}	C^{P}	1^{P}	2	1^{F}	1^{P F}	12	3	14	453
3	(Belgium) EG 0,0 Marc VDS	36	11	7	4	11	3	3	Ret	5	2^{F}	Ret	8	C	5	6	Ret	11	2	10	Ret	328
3	(Belgium) EG 0,0 Marc VDS	73	3^{P}	5	2^{P}	Ret	2	5	3	3	13	Ret	Ret	C	18	4^{F}	Ret	4	7	7^{P}	3^{F}	328
4	(Germany) Dynavolt Intact GP	23	7	10	Ret	7	4	Ret	4	4	6	7	7	C	3	5	Ret	10	9	9	7	278
4	(Germany) Dynavolt Intact GP	97	8	2^{P F}	Ret	4	5	9	5	Ret	7	5^{F}	DNS	C	10	Ret	11	7	3	11	Ret	278
5	(Spain) Pons HP40	7	2^{F}	4	10	1^{P F}	Ret^{F}	2	7	26^{F}	Ret	4	26	C	6	3	Ret^{P}	2	22	6	Ret	217
5	(Spain) Pons HP40	40	13	20	18	14	11	Ret	14	12	15	12	Ret	C	Ret	13	Ret	6	4^{F}	Ret	8	217
6	(Italy) Italtrans Racing Team	5	19	15	14	15	12	8	11	10	Ret	14	13	C	14	16	9	16	20	12	9	193
6	(Italy) Italtrans Racing Team	54	4	1	7	5	18	Ret^{P}	Ret	11	Ret^{P}	10	4	C	4^{F}	8	6	14	Ret^{P}	4	4	193
7	(Italy) HDR Heidrun - Speed Up	20	20	22	15	10	8	11	1^{P F}	2	9	11	9	C	7	9	5	DSQ	10	5	6	147
7	(Italy) HDR Heidrun - Speed Up	52	17	12	Ret	Ret	21	Ret	21	Ret	Ret	Ret	12	C	Ret	Ret						147
7	(Italy) HDR Heidrun - Speed Up	57															19	23	15	20		147
7	(Italy) HDR Heidrun - Speed Up	70																			Ret	147
8	(Switzerland) Swiss Innovative Investors	22	Ret	13	24	8	13	Ret	9	9	5	9	Ret	C	Ret	20	Ret	17	14	15	Ret	129
8	(Switzerland) Swiss Innovative Investors	27	Ret	11	5	9	Ret	13	10	16	19	13	10	C	19	14	7	8	Ret	Ret	2	129
9	(Italy) Federal Oil Gresini Moto2	9	10	Ret	8	17	Ret	Ret	Ret	13	10	8	5	C	9	10	17	Ret	Ret	13	Ret	58
10	(Italy) Tasca Racing Scuderia Moto2	21	29	27	28	21	Ret	21	Ret	25	23		Ret	C	24	Ret	25	Ret	Ret	25	19	53
10	(Italy) Tasca Racing Scuderia Moto2	24	14	23	12	12	14	10	12	15	8	15	Ret	C	11	12	10	Ret	19	16	10	53
11	(Germany) Kiefer Racing	3				20	23															47
11	(Germany) Kiefer Racing	77	15	8	9			12	20	14	14	17	17	C	13	21	16	13	6	14	11	47
12	(France) Tech 3 Racing	14				23	Ret	20													DNS	42
12	(France) Tech 3 Racing	30																		23		42
12	(France) Tech 3 Racing	64	18	28	20	16	16	Ret	Ret	17	20	Ret	22	C	20	25	14	Ret				42
12	(France) Tech 3 Racing	67																	21			42
12	(France) Tech 3 Racing	87	12	6	17				15	18	11	Ret	Ret	C	12	19	12	15	Ret	Ret	5	42
13	(Japan) Idemitsu Honda Team Asia	45	21	17	19	13	25	Ret	13	DNS	Ret	16	15	C	Ret	15	8	12	13	Ret	12	28
13	(Japan) Idemitsu Honda Team Asia	89	23	24	25	18	15	18	19	19	17	20	16	C	22	27	21	22	16	17	Ret	28
14	(Spain) SAG Team	2													15	23		20	8	19	15	17
14	(Spain) SAG Team	32	16	14	11	19	Ret	16	Ret	22	Ret											17
14	(Spain) SAG Team	55										Ret	24	C								17
14	(Spain) SAG Team	95	27	Ret	26	24	20	Ret	23	23	Ret	22	20	C	23	26	20	25	Ret	22	18	17
14	(Spain) SAG Team	99															18					17
15	(Italy) Marinelli Snipers Team	13	24	19	16	Ret	7	Ret	Ret	Ret	16	Ret	11	C	DSQ							14
15	(Italy) Marinelli Snipers Team	18														28	22	27	Ret	Ret	17	14
16	(Netherlands) NTS RW Racing GP	4	22	18	21	Ret	17	15	18	20	18	19	18	C	17	18	23	19	17	21	13	9
16	(Netherlands) NTS RW Racing GP	16	25	25	23	Ret	19	14	22	21	22	18	19	C	16	24	13	18	18	18	Ret	9
17	(Switzerland) Forward Racing Team	3																			20	8
17	(Switzerland) Forward Racing Team	32											23	C	DNS	DNS	24	26	Ret		16	8
17	(Switzerland) Forward Racing Team	50																		26		8
17	(Switzerland) Forward Racing Team	51	30	29	22	Ret	Ret	19	25	24	21	23										8
17	(Switzerland) Forward Racing Team	62	26	21	Ret	Ret	10	Ret	Ret	Ret	25	Ret	14	C	Ret	Ret	Ret	24	DNS			8
18	(Malaysia) Petronas Sprinta Racing	63	28	26	27	Ret																1
18	(Malaysia) Petronas Sprinta Racing	66					22	17	Ret	DNS	DNS	21	21	C	21	22	15	21	DNS	Ret	Ret	1
Pos.	Team	Bike No.	QAT (Qatar)	ARG (Argentina)	AME (United States)	SPA (Spain)	FRA (France)	ITA (Italy)	CAT (Catalonia)	NED (Netherlands)	GER (Germany)	CZE (Czech Republic)	AUT (Austria)	GBR (United Kingdom)	RSM (San Marino)	ARA (Aragon)	THA (Thailand)	JPN (Japan)	AUS (Australia)	MAL (Malaysia)	VAL (Valencian Community)	Pts
