= Aragon motorcycle Grand Prix =

Coordinates: 41.0783°N 0.2075°W

Aragon Grand Prix

Grand Prix motorcycle racing
- Venue: MotorLand Aragón (2010–2022, 2024–present)
- First race: 2010
- Most wins (rider): Marc Márquez (9)
- Most wins (manufacturer): Honda (12)

The Aragon motorcycle Grand Prix is a motorcycling event part of the FIM Grand Prix motorcycle racing season. Its first edition was held in 2010, originally to replace the cancelled race at Balatonring. The event returned to the calendar, as MotorLand Aragón has a contract to host at least three Grands Prix between 2022 and 2026.

== Official names and sponsors ==
- 2010: Gran Premio A-Style de Aragón
- 2011: Gran Premio de Aragón (no official sponsor)
- 2012–2013: Gran Premio Iveco de Aragón
- 2014–2018: Gran Premio Movistar de Aragón
- 2019–2020: Gran Premio Michelin de Aragón
- 2021: Gran Premio Tissot de Aragón
- 2022: Gran Premio Animoca Brands de Aragón
- 2024: Gran Premio GoPro de Aragón
- 2025: GoPro Grand Prix of Aragon
- 2026: Michelin Grand Prix of Aragon

== Winners ==
=== Multiple winners (riders) ===
# Wins	Rider	Wins	
# Wins	Rider	Category	Years won
9	(Spain) Marc Márquez	MotoGP	2013, 2016, 2017, 2018, 2019, 2024, 2025, 2026
9	(Spain) Marc Márquez	Moto2	2011
2	(Australia) Casey Stoner	MotoGP	2010, 2011
2	(Spain) Pol Espargaró	Moto2	2012
2	(Spain) Pol Espargaró	125cc	2010
2	(Spain) Nicolás Terol	Moto2	2013
2	(Spain) Nicolás Terol	125cc	2011
2	(Spain) Jorge Lorenzo	MotoGP	2014, 2015
2	(South Africa) Brad Binder	Moto2	2018, 2019
2	(Spain) Álex Rins	MotoGP	2020
2	(Spain) Álex Rins	Moto3	2013
2	(United Kingdom) Sam Lowes	Moto2	2016, 2020

=== Multiple winners (manufacturers) ===
# Wins	Manufacturer	Wins	
# Wins	Manufacturer	Category	Years won
12	(Japan) Honda	MotoGP	2011, 2012, 2013, 2016, 2017, 2018, 2019
12	(Japan) Honda	Moto3	2016, 2017, 2018, 2020, 2021
11	(Germany) Kalex	Moto2	2012, 2014, 2015, 2016, 2017, 2020, 2021, 2022, 2024, 2025, 2026
9	(Austria) KTM	Moto2	2018, 2019
9	(Austria) KTM	Moto3	2013, 2014, 2015, 2019, 2024, 2025, 2026
6	(Italy) Ducati	MotoGP	2010, 2021, 2022, 2024, 2025, 2026
2	(Switzerland) Suter	Moto2	2011, 2013
2	(Japan) Yamaha	MotoGP	2014, 2015

=== By year ===
Year	Track	Moto3		Moto2		MotoGP		Report
Year	Track	Rider	Manufacturer	Rider	Manufacturer	Rider	Manufacturer	Report
2026	Aragon	(Spain) Máximo Quiles	KTM	(Spain) Alonso López	Kalex	(Spain) Marc Márquez	Ducati	Report
2025	Aragon	(Spain) David Muñoz	KTM	(Turkey) Deniz Öncü	Kalex	(Spain) Marc Márquez	Ducati	Report
2024	Aragon	(Spain) José Antonio Rueda	KTM	(United Kingdom) Jake Dixon	Kalex	(Spain) Marc Márquez	Ducati	Report
2022	Aragon	(Spain) Izan Guevara	GasGas	(Spain) Pedro Acosta	Kalex	(Italy) Enea Bastianini	Ducati	Report
2021	Aragon	(Italy) Dennis Foggia	Honda	(Spain) Raúl Fernández	Kalex	(Italy) Francesco Bagnaia	Ducati	Report
2020	Aragon	(Spain) Jaume Masià	Honda	(United Kingdom) Sam Lowes	Kalex	(Spain) Álex Rins	Suzuki	Report
2019	Aragon	(Spain) Arón Canet	KTM	(South Africa) Brad Binder	KTM	(Spain) Marc Márquez	Honda	Report
2018	Aragon	(Spain) Jorge Martín	Honda	(South Africa) Brad Binder	KTM	(Spain) Marc Márquez	Honda	Report
2017	Aragon	(Spain) Joan Mir	Honda	(Italy) Franco Morbidelli	Kalex	(Spain) Marc Márquez	Honda	Report
2016	Aragon	(Spain) Jorge Navarro	Honda	(United Kingdom) Sam Lowes	Kalex	(Spain) Marc Márquez	Honda	Report
2015	Aragon	(Portugal) Miguel Oliveira	KTM	(Spain) Tito Rabat	Kalex	(Spain) Jorge Lorenzo	Yamaha	Report
2014	Aragon	(Italy) Romano Fenati	KTM	(Spain) Maverick Viñales	Kalex	(Spain) Jorge Lorenzo	Yamaha	Report
2013	Aragon	(Spain) Álex Rins	KTM	(Spain) Nicolás Terol	Suter	(Spain) Marc Márquez	Honda	Report
2012	Aragon	(Spain) Luis Salom	Kalex KTM	(Spain) Pol Espargaró	Kalex	(Spain) Dani Pedrosa	Honda	Report
Year	Track	125cc		Moto2		MotoGP		Report
Year	Track	Rider	Manufacturer	Rider	Manufacturer	Rider	Manufacturer	Report
2011	Aragon	(Spain) Nicolás Terol	Aprilia	(Spain) Marc Márquez	Suter	(Australia) Casey Stoner	Honda	Report
2010	Aragon	(Spain) Pol Espargaró	Derbi	(Italy) Andrea Iannone	Speed Up	(Australia) Casey Stoner	Ducati	Report
