= Mattia Pasini =

Italian motorcycle racer

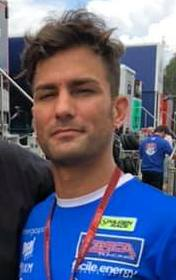
- Pasini in 2019
- Nationality: Italian
- Born: 13 August 1985 (age 41); Riccione, Emilia-Romagna, Italy
- Bike number: 54
Motorcycle racing career statistics
MotoGP World Championship
Active years	2012
Manufacturers	ART
Championships	0
2012 championship position	22nd (13 pts)
Starts / Wins / Podiums / Poles / F. laps / Points; 14 / 0 / 0 / 0 / 0 / 13
Moto2 World Championship
Active years	2010–2020, 2022–2025
Manufacturers	Motobi, Suter, FTR, Speed Up, Forward KLX, Kalex, Boscoscuro
Championships	0
2024 championship position	34th (0 pts)
Starts / Wins / Podiums / Poles / F. laps / Points; 136 / 2 / 4 / 8 / 2 / 541
250cc World Championship
Active years	2008–2009
Manufacturers	Aprilia
Championships	0
2009 championship position	5th (128 pts)
Starts / Wins / Podiums / Poles / F. laps / Points; 32 / 2 / 9 / 0 / 0 / 260
125cc World Championship
Active years	2004–2007
Manufacturers	Aprilia
Championships	0
2007 championship position	5th (174 pts)
Starts / Wins / Podiums / Poles / F. laps / Points; 64 / 8 / 17 / 11 / 4 / 603

Mattia Pasini (born 13 August 1985) is an Italian Grand Prix motorcycle road racer.

== Career ==
=== Early career ===
Pasini participated in his first race at the age of nine. In 1998, aged 13, he suffered a serious motocross accident that left him with several broken bones and permanent nerve damage in his right arm.

=== 125cc World Championship ===
After several successful years in the Italian and European championships, Pasini made his 125cc world championship debut in 2004 as the teammate of Roberto Locatelli. He finished his first season in the 15th place overall, and earned the rookie of the year award. His best results were a third place in Qualifying and a seventh place in the Malaysian Grand Prix.

The following year, Pasini was running in the lead in most of the races and won the Chinese and Catalan Grands Prix. He finished the season in fourth place overall. In 2006, Pasini finished fourth overall once again, having won the Italian Grand Prix and the German Grand Prix.

The 2007 season started very badly as Pasini suffered from motorcycles malfunctions early in the year. That lowered his chances of winning the championship. Despite having four wins, one more than the championship leader Gábor Talmácsi and as many as the runner-up Héctor Faubel, Pasini ended the year in fifth place.

=== 250cc World Championship ===
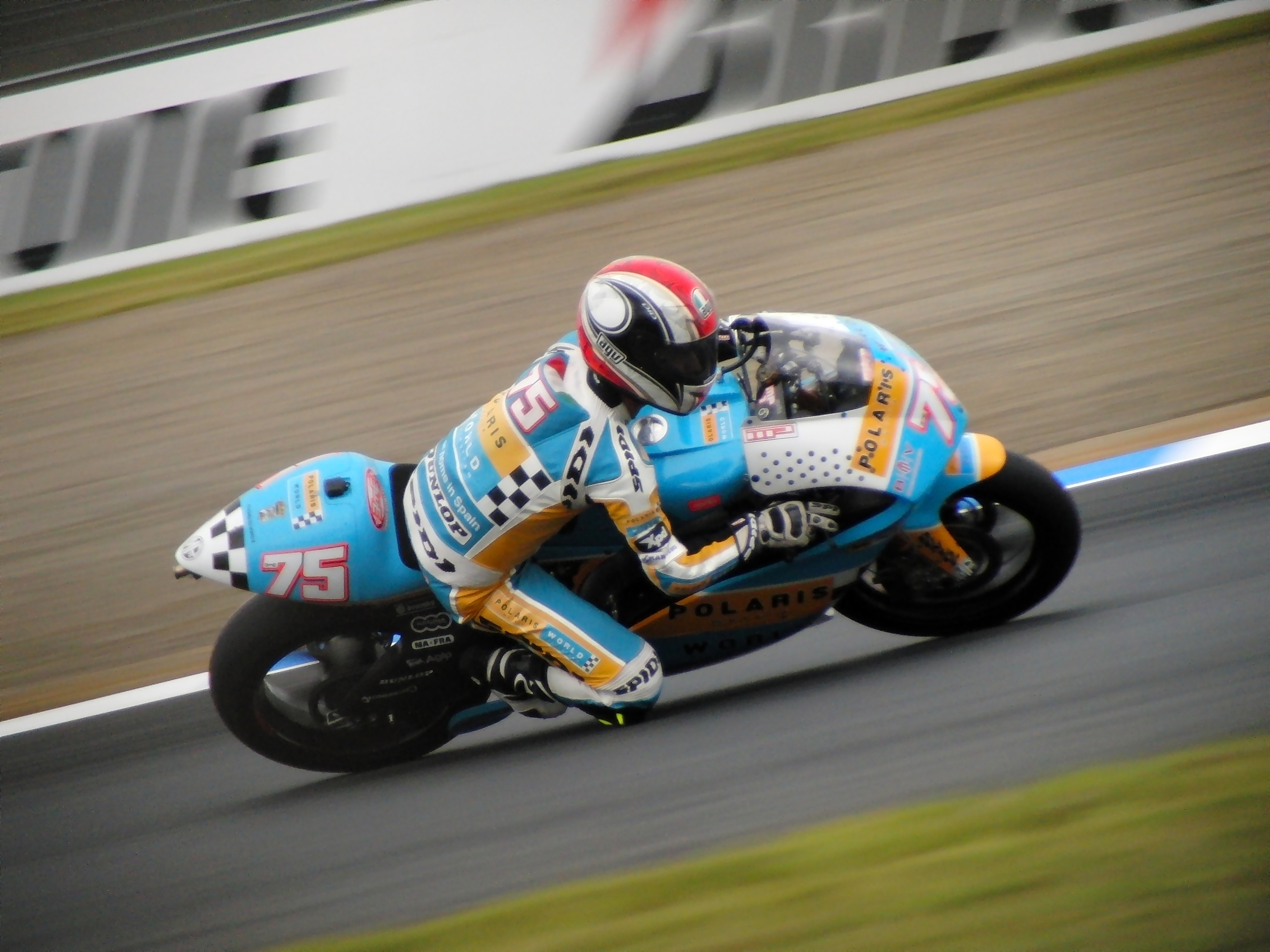
Pasini at the 2008 Japanese Grand Prix

In 2008, Pasini rode in the 250cc class for Polaris World Aprilia team. He gained his first 250cc victory in the opening round of the season during the Qatar Grand Prix and secured three more podium finishes in the first five rounds. However, he failed to maintain such form and finished no higher than fifth in the remaining races. He finished the season eighth overall and was the rookie of the year.

In 2009, Pasini was victorious at Mugello, but generally struggled to match the frontrunners.

In 2009, Pasini got a chance to test a Ducati MotoGP bike for Pramac Racing in order to evaluate him as a replacement for Mika Kallio who in turn replaced Casey Stoner at Ducati works team. After the test however, it was decided he would not be racing for Pramac in 2009.

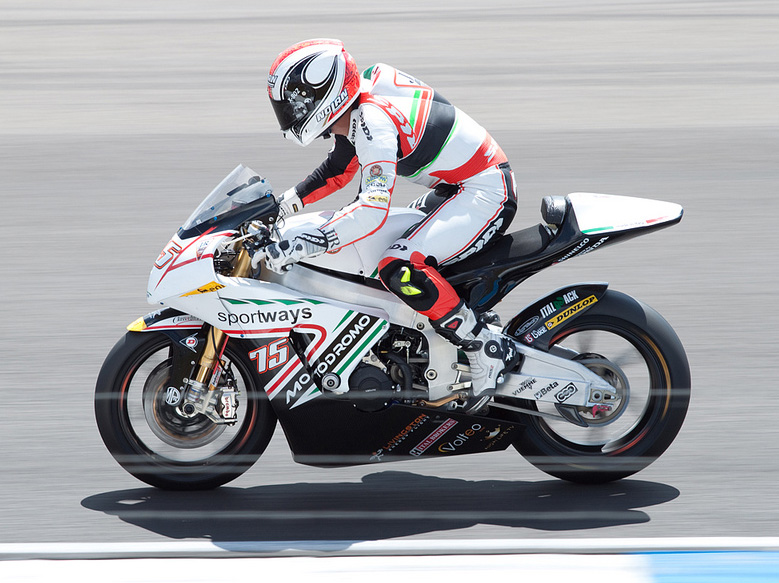
Pasini at the 2010 Dutch TT

Prior to the Portuguese Grand Prix, Pasini was forced to find a new team due to issues with Team Toth ability to pay for the leasing of bikes from Aprilia. This led to Daniel Epp assisting Pasini in financing the lease of bikes for the remainder of the season under the banner of Team Globalgest. The team acquired all of Pasini's mechanics from Toth and raced from the Emmi – Caffe Latte teams garage for the remainder of the season.

=== MotoGP World Championship ===
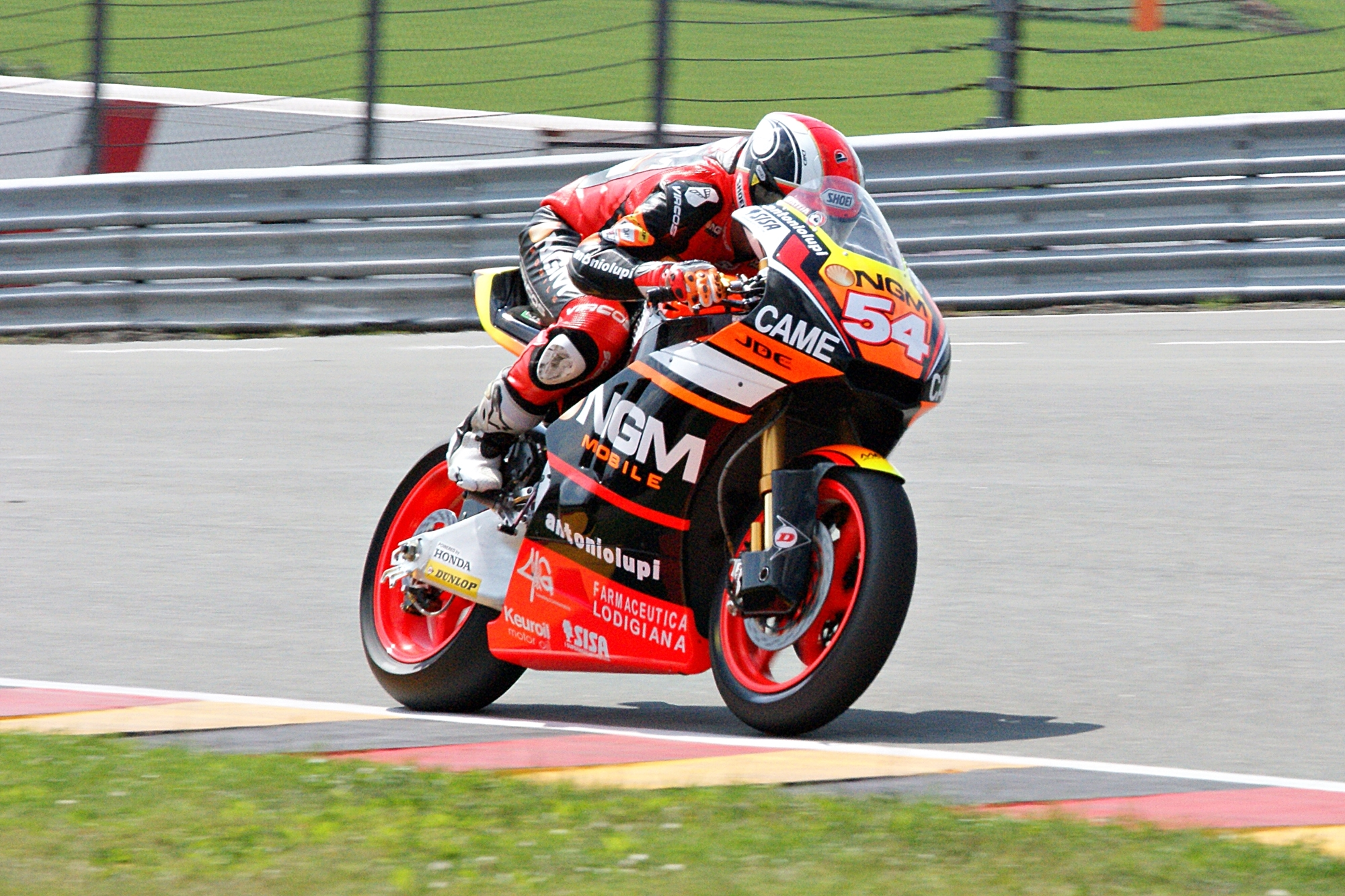
Pasini at the 2014 German Grand Prix

In January 2012, it was announced that Pasini was going to make the step up to MotoGP with the Speed Master team, replacing Anthony West, as he could not acquire the funds to retain the ride. He rode an Aprilia ART CRT bike. At Assen, he achieved his best result with tenth place.

=== Return to Moto2 ===
In 2015, Pasini was left with no full time ride. That year, he adapted to tarmac racing bikes, and implemented a system which he previously invented for motocross, that transferred front braking duties to the left arm, due to permanent nerve damage in his right arm. He has used this system in Moto2 ever since.

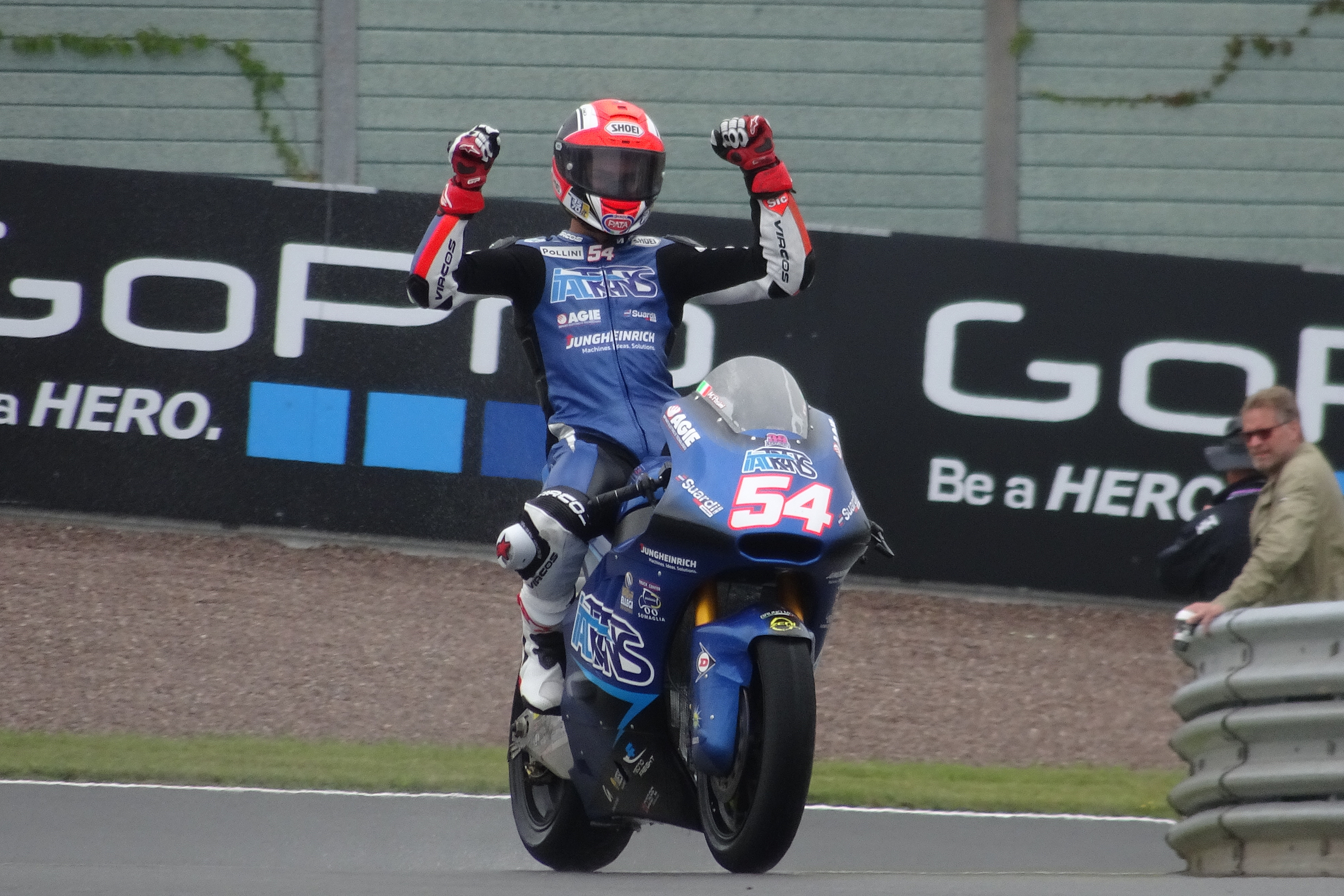
Pasini at the 2016 German Grand Prix

In 2016, Pasini made a full-time return to Moto2, racing a Kalex for Italtrans Racing. He closed the season in 11th place in championship, having scored 72 points. In 2017, Pasini won his first race in eight years at the Italian GP, and finished in sixth position in the championship. He finished ninth in the championship in 2018, having won a race at the Argentine GP. He was left without a full time ride again in 2019.

==== 2020 ====
For 2020, Pasini was an Italian commentator for the Moto2 and Moto3 classes, before stepping in as a replacement driver for Red Bull KTM Ajo in the 2020 Emilia Romagna and Rimini's Coast motorcycle Grand Prix. He took Jorge Martin's bike and finished in 16th place, just one tenth of a second behind last point scorer Stefano Manzi.

==== 2022 ====
In 2022, Pasini was a wildcard for two rounds, at Mugello and Misano driving for GasGas Aspar Team. At Mugello, he shone, topping a free practice and showing more pace than his full-time teammates before choosing the wrong tyre for the race and falling to 15th, still scoring his first points since Valencia 2019. At Misano, he was fighting rookie sensation Pedro Acosta for fifth place before falling. He also came back at Valencia for RW Racing, in place of the injured Barry Baltus. He had good pace during all the weekend and was several seconds faster than his teammate Zonta van den Goorbergh before qualifying 17th. He bounced back during the race running eighth before being taken out by Jeremy Alcoba. He finished the championship in 31st place with just one point, still in front of other full-time riders.

==== 2023 ====
Pasini also race as a wild card for the BMP Tappi RW Racing GP team in Misano.

=== Sportscar racing ===
Pasini made his four-wheel debut with Inter Europol Competition racing a LMP3 class Ligier JS P320 in the 2021 European Le Mans Series at the 4 Hours of Barcelona. He finished seventh with 1 podium and 37 points.

== Personal life ==
Pasini was born in Riccione, Province of Rimini, Emilia-Romagna. He has two younger sisters. In May 2005, Pasini was reported to be living in San Lorenzo in Strada, a hamlet in Riccione.

== Career statistics ==
=== FIM Moto2 European Championship ===
==== Races by year ====
(key) (Races in bold indicate pole position, races in italics indicate fastest lap)

Year	Bike	1	2	3	4	5	6	7	8	9	10	11	Pos	Pts
2024	Boscoscuro	MIS; WD	EST1	EST2	CAT1; WD	CAT2; WD	POR1	POR2	JER	ARA1	ARA2	EST	NC	0
2026	Kalex	CAT1	CAT2	EST1	EST2	JER	MAG1	MAG2	VAL	ARA1	ARA2	MIS; WD	NC	0

=== Grand Prix motorcycle racing ===
==== By season ====
Season	Class	Motorcycle	Team	Race	Win	Podium	Pole	FLap	Pts	Plcd
2004	125cc	Aprilia	Safilo Carrera - LCR	16	0	0	0	0	54	15th
2005	125cc	Aprilia	Totti Top Sport - NGS	15	2	6	0	0	183	4th
2006	125cc	Aprilia	Master - MVA Aspar Team	16	2	6	2	2	192	4th
2007	125cc	Aprilia	Polaris World	17	4	5	9	2	174	5th
2008	250cc	Aprilia	Polaris World	16	1	4	0	0	132	8th
2009	250cc	Aprilia	Team Tóth	16	1	5	0	0	128	5th
2010	Moto2	Motobi	JiR Moto2	8	0	0	0	0	12	28th
2010	Moto2	Suter	Italtrans Racing Team	8	0	0	0	0	12	28th
2011	Moto2	FTR	IodaRacing Project	17	0	0	0	0	28	24th
2012	MotoGP	ART	Speed Master	14	0	0	0	0	13	22nd
2012	Moto2	FTR	NGM Mobile Forward Racing	1	0	0	0	0	0	NC
2013	Moto2	Speed Up	NGM Mobile Racing	17	0	0	0	0	58	15th
2014	Moto2	Forward KLX	NGM Forward Racing	17	0	0	0	0	35	21st
2014	Moto2	Kalex	NGM Forward Racing	17	0	0	0	0	35	21st
2015	Moto2	Kalex	Gresini Racing Moto2	2	0	0	0	0	0	NC
2016	Moto2	Kalex	Italtrans Racing Team	18	0	0	0	0	72	11th
2017	Moto2	Kalex	Italtrans Racing Team	18	1	3	5	1	148	6th
2018	Moto2	Kalex	Italtrans Racing Team	18	1	1	3	1	141	9th
2019	Moto2	Kalex	Pons HP40; Petronas Sprinta Racing; Tasca Racing Scuderia Moto2	11	0	0	0	0	35	20th
2019	Moto2	KTM	Sama Qatar Ángel Nieto Team	1	0	0	0	0	35	20th
2020	Moto2	Kalex	Red Bull KTM Ajo	1	0	0	0	0	0	29th
2022	Moto2	Kalex	GasGas Aspar Team	2	0	0	0	0	1	33rd
2022	Moto2	Kalex	RW Racing GP	1	0	0	0	0	1	33rd
2023	Moto2	Kalex	BMP Tappi Fieten Olie Racing GP	2	0	0	0	0	11	25th
2024	Moto2	Boscoscuro	Team Ciatti Speed Up	4	0	0	0	0	0	34th
2025	Moto2	Kalex	Fantic Racing Redemption	2	0	0	0	0	0*	36th*
Total				**250**	**12**	**30**	**19**	**6**	**1417**	

==== By class ====
Class	Seasons	1st GP	1st Pod	1st Win	Race	Win	Podiums	Pole	FLap	Pts	WChmp
125cc	2004–2007	2004 South Africa	2005 China	2005 China	64	8	17	11	4	603	0
250cc	2008–2009	2008 Qatar	2008 Qatar	2008 Qatar	32	2	9	0	0	260	0
Moto2	2010–2020, 2022–2025	2010 Qatar	2017 Italy	2017 Italy	140	2	4	8	2	541	0
MotoGP	2012	2012 Qatar			14	0	0	0	0	13	0
2004–2020, 2022–2025					**250**	**12**	**30**	**19**	**6**	**1417**	**0**

==== Races by year ====
(key) (Races in bold indicate pole position; races in italics indicate fastest lap)

Year	Class	Bike	1	2	3	4	5	6	7	8	9	10	11	12	13	14	15	16	17	18	19	20	21	22	Pos	Pts
2004	125cc	Aprilia	RSA; 13	SPA; Ret	FRA; 12	ITA; 8	CAT; 11	NED; 11	BRA; 10	GER; 20	GBR; Ret	CZE; 14	POR; 17	JPN; Ret	QAT; 9	MAL; 7	AUS; 18	VAL; 11							15th	54
2005	125cc	Aprilia	SPA; 4	POR; 8	CHN; 1	FRA; DNS	ITA; 4	CAT; 1	NED; 3	GBR; Ret	GER; Ret	CZE; Ret	JPN; 5	MAL; 3	QAT; 9	AUS; 4	TUR; 2	VAL; 3							4th	183
2006	125cc	Aprilia	**SPA**; 3	QAT; 4	TUR; 17	CHN; 2	**FRA**; Ret	ITA; 1	CAT; 4	NED; 7	GBR; 3	GER; 1	CZE; 6	MAL; 7	AUS; 3	JPN; 4	POR; Ret	VAL; 9							4th	192
2007	125cc	Aprilia	QAT; Ret	**SPA**; Ret	**TUR**; Ret	**CHN**; 10	**FRA**; Ret	ITA; 6	CAT; Ret	**GBR**; 1	**NED**; 1	GER; Ret	CZE; 2	RSM; 1	**POR**; 8	**JPN**; 1	**AUS**; 7	MAL; 8	VAL; 4						5th	174
2008	250cc	Aprilia	QAT; 1	SPA; 2	POR; Ret	CHN; 3	FRA; 3	ITA; 5	CAT; 6	GBR; Ret	NED; Ret	GER; 6	CZE; 7	RSM; Ret	INP; C	JPN; 8	AUS; Ret	MAL; Ret	VAL; 9						8th	132
2009	250cc	Aprilia	QAT; Ret	JPN; 3	SPA; 6	FRA; Ret	ITA; 1	CAT; 4	NED; Ret	GER; Ret	GBR; 3	CZE; 2	INP; Ret	RSM; 2	POR; 8	AUS; Ret	MAL; Ret	VAL; Ret							5th	128
2010	Moto2	Motobi	QAT; 6	SPA; Ret	FRA; Ret	ITA; Ret	GBR; Ret	NED; 14	CAT	GER	CZE	INP													28th	12
2010	Moto2	Suter											RSM; Ret	ARA; Ret	JPN	MAL	AUS	POR	VAL						28th	12
2011	Moto2	FTR	QAT; Ret	SPA; 13	POR; 20	FRA; 23	CAT; Ret	GBR; Ret	NED; 6	ITA; 20	GER; 19	CZE; 11	INP; 8	RSM; 17	ARA; Ret	JPN; 14	AUS; Ret	MAL; Ret	VAL; Ret						24th	28
2012	MotoGP	ART	QAT; 17	SPA; 14	POR; Ret	FRA; 12	CAT; 17	GBR; Ret	NED; 10	GER; Ret	ITA; 15	USA; Ret	INP; Ret	CZE; 16	RSM; Ret	ARA; 16	JPN	MAL	AUS						22nd	13
2012	Moto2	FTR																		VAL; 25					NC	0
2013	Moto2	Speed Up	QAT; Ret	AME; 7	SPA; 15	FRA; 6	ITA; 24	CAT; 11	NED; 18	GER; 19	INP; 25	CZE; 14	GBR; 10	RSM; 11	ARA; 9	MAL; Ret	AUS; 16	JPN; 10	VAL; 9						15th	58
2014	Moto2	Forward KLX	QAT; 17	AME; 12	ARG; Ret	SPA; 18																			21st	35
2014	Moto2	Kalex					FRA; Ret	ITA; Ret	CAT; 6	NED; 17	GER; 8	INP; DNS	CZE; 17	GBR; 9	RSM; 13	ARA; 21	JPN; Ret	AUS; Ret	MAL; 13	VAL; Ret					21st	35
2015	Moto2	Kalex	QAT	AME	ARG	SPA	FRA	ITA; 18	CAT	NED	GER	INP	CZE	GBR	RSM; 16	ARA	JPN	AUS	MAL	VAL					NC	0
2016	Moto2	Kalex	QAT; 16	ARG; 10	AME; 17	SPA; 12	FRA; 16	ITA; Ret	CAT; 12	NED; 19	GER; 4	AUT; 13	CZE; 4	GBR; 9	RSM; 16	ARA; 12	JPN; 7	AUS; Ret	MAL; 23	VAL; 7					11th	72
2017	Moto2	Kalex	QAT; 24	ARG; 20	AME; 22	SPA; 4	FRA; 5	ITA; 1	CAT; DSQ	NED; 4	GER; 5	**CZE**; Ret	**AUT**; 5	**GBR**; 2	**RSM**; Ret	ARA; 2	JPN; 5	**AUS**; Ret	MAL; 4	VAL; 19					6th	148
2018	Moto2	Kalex	QAT; 4	ARG; 1	AME; 7	SPA; 5	FRA; 18	**ITA**; Ret	CAT; Ret	NED; 11	**GER**; Ret	CZE; 10	AUT; 4	GBR; C	RSM; 4	ARA; 8	THA; 6	JPN; 14	**AUS**; Ret	MAL; 4	VAL; 4				9th	141
2019	Moto2	Kalex	QAT	ARG	AME; 4		FRA; Ret	ITA; 11	CAT	NED	GER	CZE; Ret	AUT; 10	GBR; 13	RSM; DNS	ARA	THA; Ret	JPN; Ret	AUS; Ret	MAL; 13	VAL; 11				20th	35
2019	Moto2	KTM				SPA; Ret																			20th	35
2020	Moto2	Kalex	QAT	SPA	ANC	CZE	AUT	STY	RSM	EMI; 16	CAT	FRA	ARA	TER	EUR	VAL	POR								29th	0
2022	Moto2	Kalex	QAT	INA	ARG	AME	POR	SPA	FRA	ITA; 15	CAT	GER	NED	GBR	AUT	RSM; Ret	ARA	JPN	THA	AUS	MAL	VAL; Ret			33rd	1
2023	Moto2	Kalex	POR	ARG	AME	SPA	FRA	ITA; 11	GER	NED	GBR	AUT	CAT	RSM; 10	IND	JPN	INA	AUS	THA	MAL	QAT	VAL			25th	11
2024	Moto2	Boscoscuro	QAT	POR	AME	SPA	FRA	CAT; 17	ITA; 26	NED	GER	GBR	AUT; 23	CAT	RSM; Ret	EMI	INA	JPN	AUS	THA	MAL	SLD			34th	0
2025	Moto2	Kalex	THA	ARG	AME	QAT	SPA	FRA	GBR	ARA	ITA	NED	GER	CZE; Ret	AUT; 22	HUN	CAT	RSM	JPN	INA	AUS	MAL	POR	VAL	37th	0

=== CIV Championship (Campionato Italiano Velocita) ===
==== Races by year ====
(key) (Races in bold indicate pole position; races in italics indicate fastest lap)

Year	Class	Bike	1	2	3	4	5	6	7	8	9	10	11	12	Pos	Pts
2003	125cc	Aprilia	MIS1; Ret	MUG1; 9	MIS1; 3	MUG2; 3	VAL; 12								4th	43
2022	Superbike	Yamaha	MIS1; Ret	MIS2; 7	VAL1	VAL2	MUG1	MUG2	MIS1	MIS2	MUG2	MUG2	IMO1	IMO2	20th	9

=== Complete European Le Mans Series results ===
(key) (Races in bold indicate pole position; results in italics indicate fastest lap)

Year	Entrant	Class	Chassis	Engine	1	2	3	4	5	6	Rank	Points
2021	Inter Europol Competition	LMP3	Ligier JS P320	Nissan VK56DE 5.6L V8	CAT; 8	RBR; 5	LEC; 6	MNZ; 3	SPA; NC	ALG	7th	37
