= Brad Binder =

South African motorcycle racer (born 1995)

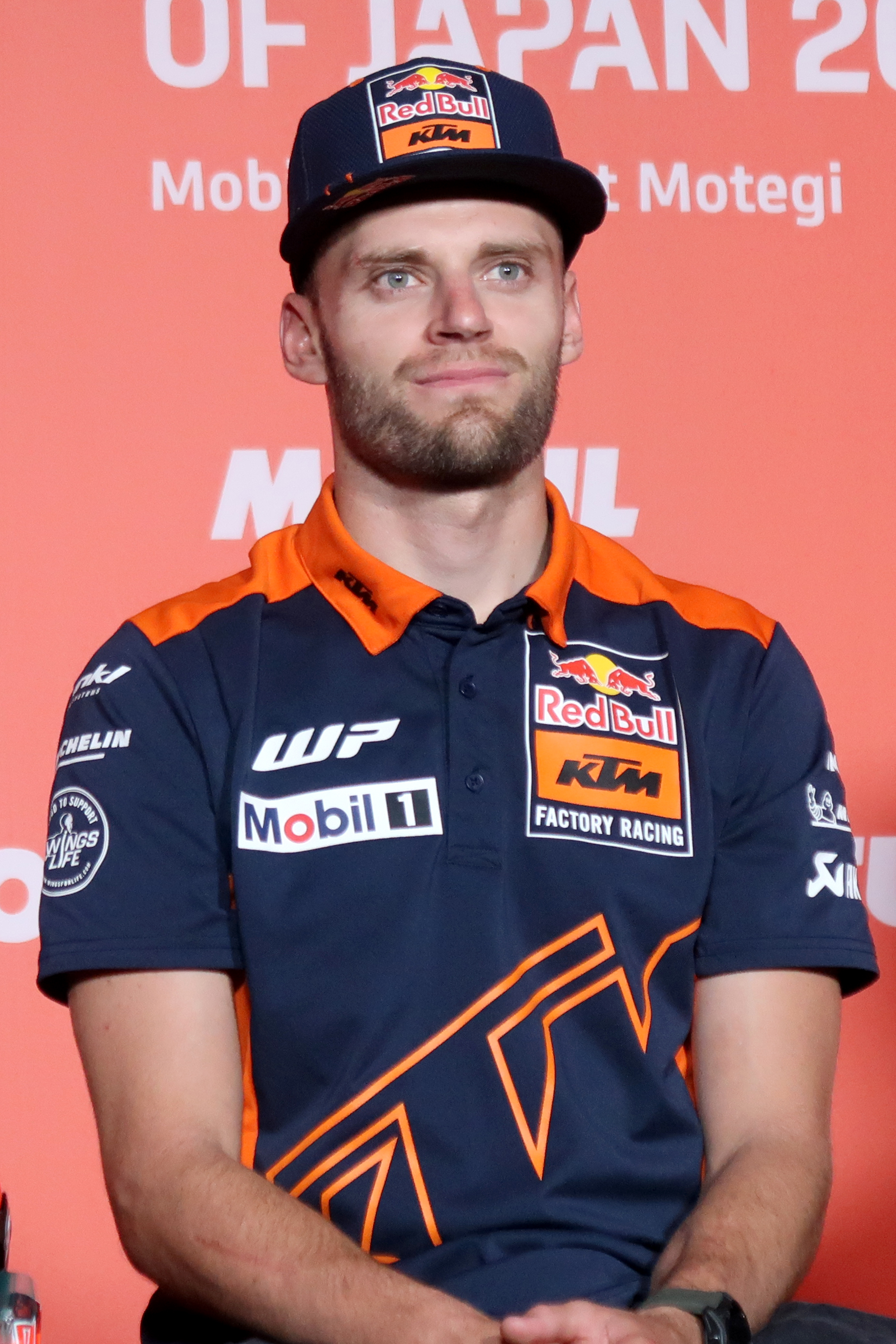
- Binder at the 2023 Japanese Grand Prix
- Nationality: South African
- Born: 11 August 1995 (age 31); Potchefstroom, South Africa
- Current team: Red Bull KTM Factory Racing
- Bike number: 33
- Website: Brad Binder 33
Motorcycle racing career statistics
MotoGP World Championship
Active years	2020–
Manufacturers	KTM
Championships	0
2025 championship position	11th (155 pts)
Starts / Wins / Podiums / Poles / F. laps / Points; 133 / 2 / 11 / 0 / 4 / 1133
Moto2 World Championship
Active years	2017–2019
Manufacturers	KTM
Championships	0
2019 championship position	2nd (259 pts)
Starts / Wins / Podiums / Poles / F. laps / Points; 52 / 8 / 15 / 1 / 3 / 585
Moto3 World Championship
Active years	2012–2016
Manufacturers	Kalex KTM (2012); Suter Honda (2013); Mahindra (2013–2014); KTM (2015–2016)
Championships	1 (2016)
2016 championship position	1st (319 pts)
Starts / Wins / Podiums / Poles / F. laps / Points; 88 / 7 / 20 / 6 / 7 / 677
125cc World Championship
Active years	2011
Manufacturers	Aprilia
Championships	0
2011 championship position	NC (0 pts)
Starts / Wins / Podiums / Poles / F. laps / Points; 5 / 0 / 0 / 0 / 0 / 0

Brad Binder (born 11 August 1995) is a South African Grand Prix motorcycle racer competing for Red Bull KTM Factory Racing. He is the 2016 Moto3 World Champion.

Previously, Binder had competed in the Moto2 class during 2019, with the Ajo KTM team, finishing the championship in second place. Prior to moving up into Grand Prix level, Binder contested three seasons of the Red Bull MotoGP Rookies Cup, with a best finish of fifth overall in the championship standings.

At the 2016 Spanish motorcycle Grand Prix in Jerez, Binder became the first South African to win a motorcycle Grand Prix since Jon Ekerold won the 350 cc class at the 1981 Italian motorcycle Grand Prix. From 2017, Binder raced in the Moto2 class having agreed to a deal with Ajo Motorsport.

Binder's younger brother Darryn is also a motorcycle racer, and competed alongside Binder in Moto3 in both 2015 and 2016, as well as MotoGP in 2022.

Binder became the first, and so far, the only South African to win a MotoGP championship race at the 2020 Czech Republic motorcycle Grand Prix, also becoming the first rider to win with KTM in the premier class, as well as being the first rookie to win in MotoGP since Marc Márquez at the 2013 Motorcycle Grand Prix of the Americas.

== Career ==
=== Early career ===
Binder began his motorsports career in go-karting in 2003. In 2005, he switched to two wheels, immediately winning several titles in the 50cc, 125cc and 150cc categories. In 2008, he made his international debut, competing in the Aprilia Superteens Series, a British competition. In his first race he finished in second place, but in the second race he crashed. In 2009, he raced in the Red Bull MotoGP Rookies Cup finishing 14th, in 2010 he finished fifth, and in 2011, he finished seventh.

=== 125cc/Moto3 World Championship (2011–2016) ===
==== RW Racing GP (2011–2012) ====
Binder started his Grand Prix career in the 125cc class riding an Aprilia for RW Racing GP in the 2011 season with his bike number as 14. Binder finished the season pointless, with his best position being a 17th place in Indianapolis.

In 2012, Binder switched to the Kalex KTM with his bike number changed to 41. His first Moto3 point came at the 2012 Portuguese motorcycle Grand Prix. 2012 was a crash-filled season for Binder, with seven crashes. Binder scored four times in the season, with his best result of fourth place coming in Valencia. He finished the season at 21st place with 24 points.

==== Abrogio Racing (2013–2014) ====
In 2013, Binder switched from Kalex KTM to Suter Honda and later to Mahindra with the team Ambrogio Racing. 2013 was a consistent year for Binder; he scored in 14 out of the 18 races, his best result being a fourth place at Spain; he finished the final standings at 13th place with 66 points. In 2014, he improved with two podiums to 11th place.

==== Red Bull KTM Ajo (2015–2016) ====
In 2015, Binder again switched teams to the KTM factory-supported Ajo Motorsport. His first season on the new machine was largely positive with regular points finishes and four podiums leading to an overall sixth place finish.

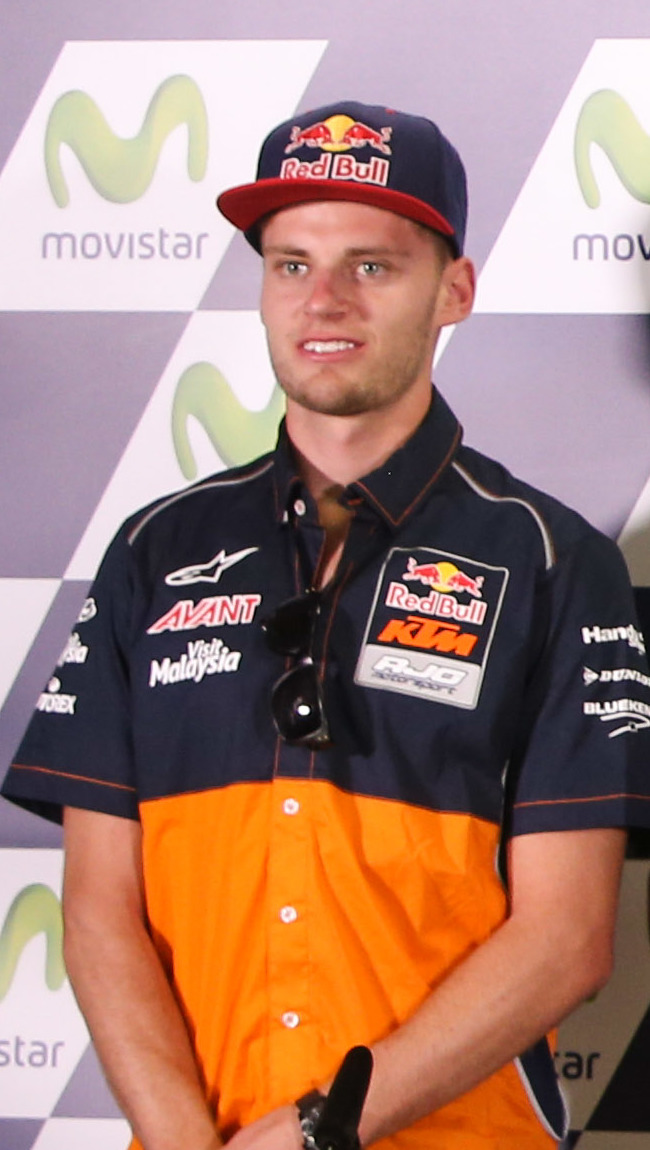
Binder in 2016

In the 2016 season, Binder built on this success with seven wins and 14 podiums en route to his first world championship, with a 142 point margin over second place.

=== Moto2 World Championship (2017–2019) ===
==== Red Bull KTM Ajo (2017–2019) ====
===== 2017 =====
In 2017, Binder moved up to the Moto2 class, continuing with Red Bull KTM Ajo. In his first season, he achieved three podiums on the way to eighth place in the riders' standings; despite having an injury and being forced to miss a few rounds.

===== 2018 =====
In 2018, Binder improved with three wins and consistent points finishes to achieve third place in the championship.

===== 2019 =====
In 2019, after a difficult start to the season for KTM with the new Triumph engine, Binder took five wins and nine podiums to finish in second place as the best KTM rider, just three points off champion Álex Márquez.

=== MotoGP World Championship (2020–2026) ===
==== Red Bull KTM Factory Racing (2020–2026) ====
===== 2020 =====
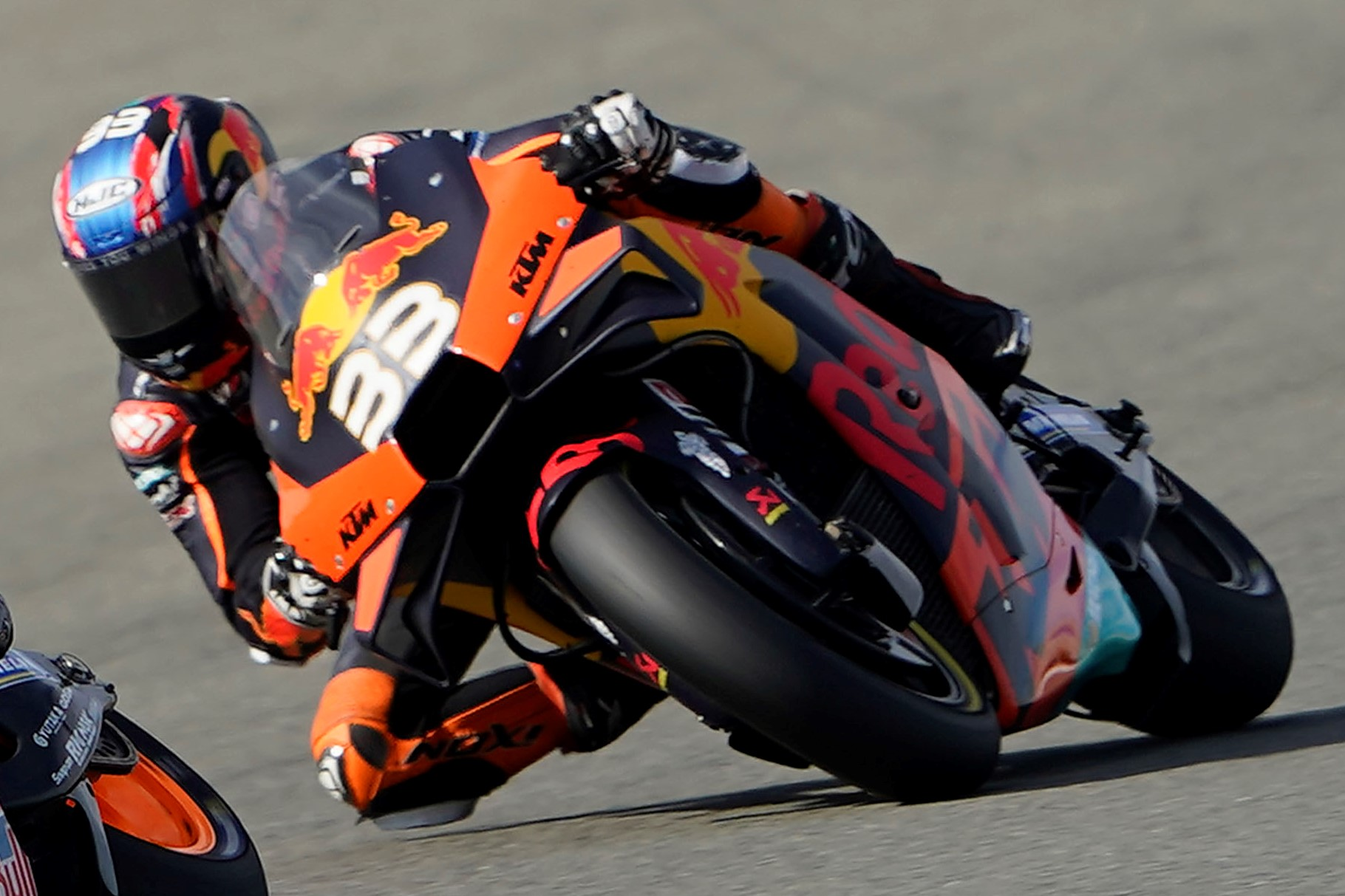
Binder racing in 2020

Binder made his MotoGP debut with Red Bull KTM Factory Racing team in the 2020 season. Binder won his first MotoGP race at the third round of the season in Brno. This was also the first race win for the Red Bull KTM Factory Racing team in the premier class.

===== 2021 =====
Binder, along with KTM, had a rough start to the 2021 season. Despite this, he maintained top-ten positions and got into the top-five four times, with two fifth places at Portimao and Mugello and two fourth place finishes at Sachsenring and Assen.

Binder scored a surprise home track victory for KTM at the Austrian MotoGP Grand Prix when, with five laps remaining and rain beginning to fall, he decided to take the chance of finishing the race on slicks while most other leading riders chose to pit and swap to motorcycles fitted with wet tires. The gamble paid off and despite extremely slick conditions and mostly ineffective brakes due to the wet and cold track surface, he was able to withstand a late charge by Ducati rider Francesco Bagnaia and win the race.

===== 2022 =====
Binder stayed with Red Bull KTM Factory Racing team for a third consecutive season for the 2022 World Championship. He started off the year with an overachieving second place finish at the Qatar Grand Prix. From then on, Brad has been a consistent top-ten finisher, with a tendency to perform better in race trim than in qualifying trim, as has been the case with his teammate Miguel Oliveira. He attained his first ever top-three qualifying result in MotoGP at the 2022 Japanese Grand Prix, which he followed up with his second podium finish of the season, in second position. The final round of the season also saw Binder finish on the podium, with second position and the fastest lap of the race.

===== 2023 =====
Binder signed a contract with Red Bull KTM Factory Racing in June 2021, to remain with the team for the 2023 World Championship and 2024. He showed his class by winning the sprint race in Argentina at the 2nd race of the season coming from 15th on the grid, and ended the season with five podium finishes in Spain, Great Britain, Austria, Thailand, and Valencia, ending the season in fourth, the highest placing for a non-Ducati rider.

On the weekend of the 2023 Austrian round, Binder extended his contract, which keeps him there until the end of 2026.

Binder at the 2026 Czech Grand Prix

Binder's contract with KTM was not extended for 2027 and beyond, and subsequently departed the category at the end of the season.

=== Superbike World Championship (2027–) ===
==== ROKiT BMW Motorrad WorldSBK Team (2027) ====
After leaving MotoGP at the end of 2026, Binder will switch to Superbike World Championship for 2027 with the ROKiT BMW Motorrad WorldSBK Team, partnering his former Red Bull KTM Factory Racing teammate Miguel Oliveira.

== Career statistics ==
=== Red Bull MotoGP Rookies Cup ===
==== Races by year ====
(key) (Races in bold indicate pole position, races in italics indicate fastest lap)

Year	1	2	3	4	5	6	7	8	9	10	11	12	13	14	Pos	Pts
2009	SPA1; 13	SPA2; 10	ITA; Ret	NED; 16	GER; Ret	GBR; 15	CZE1; 11	CZE2; 14							14th	17
2010	SPA1; 4	SPA2; Ret	ITA; 3	NED1; 7	NED2; 7	GER1; 2	GER2; 2	CZE1; 7	CZE2; 4	RSM; Ret					5th	109
2011	**SPA1**; 2	**SPA2**; Ret	**POR1**; 1	**POR2**; 17	GBR1; 15	GBR2; Ret	NED1; 10	NED2; 20	ITA; 10	GER1; 2	GER2; 9	CZE1; 12	CZE2; 10	RSM; Ret	7th	95

=== CEV Buckler Moto3 Championship ===
==== Races by year ====
(key) (Races in bold indicate pole position, races in italics indicate fastest lap)

Year	Bike	1	2	3	4	5	6	7	Pos	Pts
2012	Suter Honda	JER	NAV	ARA	CAT	ALB1	ALB2	**VAL**; 1	17th	25

=== Grand Prix motorcycle racing ===
==== By season ====
Season	Class	Motorcycle	Team	Race	Win	Podium	Pole	FLap	Pts	Plcd	WCh
2011	125cc	Aprilia	RW Racing GP	5	0	0	0	0	0	NC	–
2011	125cc	Aprilia	Andalucía Banca Cívica	5	0	0	0	0	0	NC	–
2012	Moto3	Kalex KTM	RW Racing GP	17	0	0	0	0	24	21st	–
2013	Moto3	Suter Honda	Ambrogio Racing	11	0	0	0	0	46	13th	–
2013	Moto3	Mahindra	Ambrogio Racing	6	0	0	0	0	20	13th	–
2014	Moto3	Mahindra	Ambrogio Racing	18	0	2	0	1	109	11th	–
2015	Moto3	KTM	Red Bull KTM Ajo	18	0	4	0	3	159	6th	–
2016	Moto3	KTM	Red Bull KTM Ajo	18	7	14	6	3	319	**1st**	1
2017	Moto2	KTM	Red Bull KTM Ajo	15	0	3	0	2	125	8th	–
2018	Moto2	KTM	Red Bull KTM Ajo	18	3	3	1	1	201	**3rd**	–
2019	Moto2	KTM	Red Bull KTM Ajo	19	5	9	0	0	259	**2nd**	–
2020	MotoGP	KTM	Red Bull KTM Factory Racing	14	1	1	0	2	87	11th	–
2021	MotoGP	KTM	Red Bull KTM Factory Racing	18	1	1	0	0	151	6th	–
2022	MotoGP	KTM	Red Bull KTM Factory Racing	20	0	3	0	1	188	6th	–
2023	MotoGP	KTM	Red Bull KTM Factory Racing	20	0	5	0	1	293	4th	–
2024	MotoGP	KTM	Red Bull KTM Factory Racing	19	0	1	0	0	217	5th	–
2025	MotoGP	KTM	Red Bull KTM Factory Racing	22	0	0	0	0	155	11th	–
2026	MotoGP	KTM	Red Bull KTM Factory Racing	9	0	0	0	0	42*	12th*	–
Total				**268**	**17**	**46**	**7**	**14**	**2395**		**1**

==== By class ====
Class	Seasons	1st GP	1st pod	1st win	Race	Win	Podiums	Pole	FLap	Pts	WChmp
125cc	2011	2011 Indianapolis			5	0	0	0	0	0	0
Moto3	2012–2016	2012 Qatar	2014 Japan	2016 Spain	88	7	20	6	7	677	1
Moto2	2017–2019	2017 Qatar	2017 Australia	2018 Germany	52	8	15	1	3	585	0
MotoGP	2020–present	2020 Spain	2020 Czech Republic	2020 Czech Republic	123	2	11	0	4	1133	0
Total	2011–present				**268**	**17**	**46**	**7**	**14**	**2395**	**1**

==== Races by year ====
(key) (Races in bold indicate pole position; races in italics indicate fastest lap; ^{superscript} indicates point-scoring sprint position)

Year	Class	Bike	1	2	3	4	5	6	7	8	9	10	11	12	13	14	15	16	17	18	19	20	21	22	Pos	Pts
2011	125cc	Aprilia	QAT	SPA	POR	FRA	CAT	GBR	NED	ITA	GER	CZE	INP; 17	RSM	ARA	JPN; 20	AUS; 21	MAL; Ret	VAL; Ret						NC	0
2012	Moto3	Kalex KTM	QAT; Ret	SPA; Ret	POR; 11	FRA; Ret	CAT; Ret	GBR; 17	NED; 20	GER; Ret	ITA; 24	INP; Ret	CZE; 20	RSM; 16	ARA; 16	JPN; Ret	MAL; 12	AUS; 14	VAL; 4						21st	24
2013	Moto3	Suter Honda	QAT; 12	AME; 9	SPA; 4	FRA; 8	ITA; 14	CAT; 12	NED; 15	GER; 9	INP; Ret	CZE; Ret	GBR; Ret												13th	66
2013	Moto3	Mahindra												RSM; 18	ARA; 12	MAL; 11	AUS; 15	JPN; 10	VAL; 12						13th	66
2014	Moto3	Mahindra	QAT; 15	AME; Ret	ARG; 14	SPA; Ret	FRA; 14	ITA; 9	CAT; 6	NED; 9	GER; 2	INP; 9	CZE; 6	GBR; 15	RSM; 6	ARA; 8	JPN; 3	AUS; 15	MAL; Ret	VAL; 9					11th	109
2015	Moto3	KTM	QAT; 10	AME; 5	ARG; 5	SPA; 3	FRA; Ret	ITA; 10	CAT; 9	NED; 7	GER; 7	INP; 8	CZE; 3	GBR; Ret	RSM; 5	ARA; Ret	JPN; 17	AUS; 3	MAL; 2	VAL; 4					6th	159
2016	Moto3	KTM	QAT; 2	**ARG**; 3	AME; 3	SPA; 1	FRA; 1	ITA; 1	**CAT**; 2	NED; 12	GER; 8	AUT; 2	**CZE**; Ret	GBR; 1	**RSM**; 1	ARA; 2	JPN; 2	**AUS**; 1	**MAL**; 17	VAL; 1					1st	319
2017	Moto2	KTM	QAT; 20	ARG; 9	AME	SPA	FRA	ITA; 10	CAT; 17	NED; 13	GER; 7	CZE; 12	AUT; 7	GBR; 9	RSM; 4	ARA; 5	JPN; Ret	AUS; 2	MAL; 2	VAL; 3					8th	125
2018	Moto2	KTM	QAT; 6	ARG; Ret	AME; 6	SPA; 6	FRA; 9	ITA; 6	CAT; 6	NED; 7	GER; 1	CZE; 6	AUT; 6	GBR; C	RSM; 8	**ARA**; 1	THA; 4	JPN; 5	AUS; 1	MAL; 8	VAL; Ret				3rd	201
2019	Moto2	KTM	QAT; 12	ARG; 6	AME; Ret	SPA; 5	FRA; 4	ITA; 15	CAT; 11	NED; 2	GER; 2	CZE; Ret	AUT; 1	GBR; 3	RSM; 6	ARA; 1	THA; 2	JPN; 12	AUS; 1	MAL; 1	VAL; 1				2nd	259
2020	MotoGP	KTM	SPA; 13	ANC; Ret	CZE; 1	AUT; 4	STY; 8	RSM; 12	EMI; Ret	CAT; 11	FRA; 12	ARA; 11	TER; Ret	EUR; 7	VAL; 5	POR; Ret									11th	87
2021	MotoGP	KTM	QAT; 14	DOH; 8	POR; 5	SPA; Ret	FRA; 13	ITA; 5	CAT; 8	GER; 4	NED; 12	STY; 4	AUT; 1	GBR; 6	ARA; 7	RSM; 9	AME; 9	EMI; 11	ALR; 10	VAL; 7					6th	151
2022	MotoGP	KTM	QAT; 2	INA; 8	ARG; 6	AME; 12	POR; Ret	SPA; 10	FRA; 8	ITA; 7	CAT; 8	GER; 7	NED; 5	GBR; 11	AUT; 7	RSM; 8	ARA; 4	JPN; 2	THA; 10	AUS; 10	MAL; 8	VAL; 2			6th	188
2023	MotoGP	KTM	POR; 6	ARG; 17^{1}	AME; 13^{5}	SPA; 2^{1}	FRA; 6^{2}	ITA; 5	GER; Ret^{6}	NED; 4^{5}	GBR; 3^{9}	AUT; 2^{2}	CAT; Ret^{4}	RSM; 14^{5}	IND; 4^{4}	JPN; Ret^{2}	INA; 6	AUS; 4	THA; 3^{2}	MAL; Ret^{5}	QAT; 5^{7}	VAL; 3^{2}			4th	293
2024	MotoGP	KTM	QAT; 2^{2}	POR; 4	AME; 9	SPA; 6	FRA; 8	CAT; 8	ITA; 10^{6}	NED; 6^{6}	GER; 9^{8}	GBR; Ret^{4}	AUT; 5^{7}	ARA; 4^{6}	RSM; 4^{7}	EMI; 19^{6}	INA; 8	JPN; 6	AUS; 7	THA; 6^{9}	MAL; DNS^{7}	SLD; 6^{9}			5th	217
2025	MotoGP	KTM	THA; 8^{8}	ARG; 7	AME; Ret	QAT; 13	SPA; 6	FRA; Ret	GBR; 14	ARA; Ret^{9}	ITA; 9	NED; 11	GER; 7^{6}	CZE; 8	AUT; 7^{5}	HUN; 7	CAT; Ret^{6}	RSM; 10	JPN; 12	INA; 4	AUS; 8	MAL; 9	POR; 5^{9}	VAL; 8^{8}	11th	155
2026	MotoGP	KTM	THA; 7^{6}	BRA; Ret	USA; 12	SPA; 11^{4}	FRA; Ret	CAT; 7	ITA; 11	HUN; 10	CZE; 12^{9}	NED; 11	GER; 10	GBR; 8	ARA; 10	RSM; 11	AUT; 6^{9}	JPN; 11	INA; 11	AUS; C^{6}	MAL	QAT	POR	VAL	13th*	72*

* Season still in progress.
