= 2018 Thailand motorcycle Grand Prix =

2018 Thailand Grand Prix
Race details
- Race 15 of 19 races in the 2018 Grand Prix motorcycle racing season
- Date: 7 October 2018
- Official name: PTT Thailand Grand Prix
- Location: Chang International Circuit, Buriram, Thailand
- Course: Permanent racing facility; 4.554 km (2.830 mi)

MotoGP
Pole position
Rider	(Spain) Marc Márquez	Honda
Time	1:30.088	
Fastest lap
Rider	(Spain) Marc Márquez	Honda
Time	1:31.471 on lap 16	
Podium
First	(Spain) Marc Márquez	Honda
Second	(Italy) Andrea Dovizioso	Ducati
Third	(Spain) Maverick Viñales	Yamaha

Moto2
Pole position
Rider	(Italy) Lorenzo Baldassarri	Kalex
Time	1:36.374	
Fastest lap
Rider	(Italy) Francesco Bagnaia	Kalex
Time	1:36.924 on lap 12	
Podium
First	(Italy) Francesco Bagnaia	Kalex
Second	(Italy) Luca Marini	Kalex
Third	(Portugal) Miguel Oliveira	KTM

Moto3
Pole position
Rider	(Italy) Marco Bezzecchi	KTM
Time	1:42.235	
Fastest lap
Rider	(Italy) Dennis Foggia	KTM
Time	1:42.963 on lap 3	
Podium
First	(Italy) Fabio Di Giannantonio	Honda
Second	(Italy) Lorenzo Dalla Porta	Honda
Third	(Italy) Dennis Foggia	KTM

The 2018 Thailand motorcycle Grand Prix was the fifteenth round of the 2018 MotoGP season. It was held at the Chang International Circuit in Buriram on 7 October 2018.

== Classification ==
=== MotoGP ===
Pos.	No.	Rider	Team	Manufacturer	Laps	Time/Retired	Grid	Points
1	93	(Spain) Marc Márquez	Repsol Honda Team	Honda	26	39:55.722	1	25
2	4	(Italy) Andrea Dovizioso	Ducati Team	Ducati	26	+0.115	3	20
3	25	(Spain) Maverick Viñales	Movistar Yamaha MotoGP	Yamaha	26	+0.270	4	16
4	46	(Italy) Valentino Rossi	Movistar Yamaha MotoGP	Yamaha	26	+1.564	2	13
5	5	(France) Johann Zarco	Monster Yamaha Tech 3	Yamaha	26	+2.747	8	11
6	42	(Spain) Álex Rins	Team Suzuki Ecstar	Suzuki	26	+3.023	11	10
7	35	(United Kingdom) Cal Crutchlow	LCR Honda Castrol	Honda	26	+6.520	5	9
8	19	(Spain) Álvaro Bautista	Ángel Nieto Team	Ducati	26	+6.691	12	8
9	9	(Italy) Danilo Petrucci	Alma Pramac Racing	Ducati	26	+9.944	9	7
10	43	(Australia) Jack Miller	Alma Pramac Racing	Ducati	26	+11.077	10	6
11	29	(Italy) Andrea Iannone	Team Suzuki Ecstar	Suzuki	26	+15.488	6	5
12	55	(Malaysia) Hafizh Syahrin	Monster Yamaha Tech 3	Yamaha	26	+17.691	18	4
13	41	(Spain) Aleix Espargaró	Aprilia Racing Team Gresini	Aprilia	26	+21.413	16	3
14	21	(Italy) Franco Morbidelli	EG 0,0 Marc VDS	Honda	26	+22.802	13	2
15	38	(United Kingdom) Bradley Smith	Red Bull KTM Factory Racing	KTM	26	+23.628	15	1
16	45	(United Kingdom) Scott Redding	Aprilia Racing Team Gresini	Aprilia	26	+23.804	23	
17	17	(Czech Republic) Karel Abraham	Ángel Nieto Team	Ducati	26	+32.507	17	
18	10	(Belgium) Xavier Siméon	Reale Avintia Racing	Ducati	26	+37.216	20	
19	81	(Spain) Jordi Torres	Reale Avintia Racing	Ducati	26	+39.204	21	
20	12	(Switzerland) Thomas Lüthi	EG 0,0 Marc VDS	Honda	26	+39.421	22	
21	44	(Spain) Pol Espargaró	Red Bull KTM Factory Racing	KTM	26	+53.388	19	
22	30	(Japan) Takaaki Nakagami	LCR Honda Idemitsu	Honda	24	+2 laps	14	
Ret	26	(Spain) Dani Pedrosa	Repsol Honda Team	Honda	18	Accident	7	
DNS	99	(Spain) Jorge Lorenzo	Ducati Team	Ducati		Did not start		
Sources:

- Jorge Lorenzo withdrew from the event following a crash in practice.

=== Moto2 ===
Pos.	No.	Rider	Manufacturer	Laps	Time/Retired	Grid	Points
1	42	(Italy) Francesco Bagnaia	Kalex	24	39:00.009	6	25
2	10	(Italy) Luca Marini	Kalex	24	+1.512	3	20
3	44	(Portugal) Miguel Oliveira	KTM	24	+1.651	5	16
4	41	(South Africa) Brad Binder	KTM	24	+1.808	7	13
5	20	(France) Fabio Quartararo	Speed Up	24	+6.260	8	11
6	54	(Italy) Mattia Pasini	Kalex	24	+11.784	4	10
7	27	(Spain) Iker Lecuona	KTM	24	+15.290	12	9
8	45	(Japan) Tetsuta Nagashima	Kalex	24	+16.903	18	8
9	5	(Italy) Andrea Locatelli	Kalex	24	+18.608	16	7
10	24	(Italy) Simone Corsi	Kalex	24	+21.181	13	6
11	97	(Spain) Xavi Vierge	Kalex	24	+22.021	20	5
12	87	(Australia) Remy Gardner	Tech 3	24	+23.957	19	4
13	16	(United States) Joe Roberts	NTS	24	+24.668	22	3
14	64	(Netherlands) Bo Bendsneyder	Tech 3	24	+26.302	23	2
15	66	(Finland) Niki Tuuli	Kalex	24	+26.817	28	1
16	77	(Switzerland) Dominique Aegerter	KTM	24	+30.758	14	
17	9	(Spain) Jorge Navarro	Kalex	24	+34.782	17	
18	99	(Thailand) Thitipong Warokorn	Kalex	24	+38.315	26	
19	57	(Spain) Edgar Pons	Speed Up	24	+40.294	25	
20	95	(France) Jules Danilo	Kalex	24	+40.845	30	
21	89	(Malaysia) Khairul Idham Pawi	Kalex	24	+41.349	24	
22	18	(Andorra) Xavi Cardelús	Kalex	24	+43.908	29	
23	4	(South Africa) Steven Odendaal	NTS	24	+57.257	21	
24	32	(Spain) Isaac Viñales	Suter	24	+59.207	31	
25	21	(Italy) Federico Fuligni	Kalex	24	+59.383	32	
Ret	22	(United Kingdom) Sam Lowes	KTM	23	Accident	15	
Ret	7	(Italy) Lorenzo Baldassarri	Kalex	10	Accident Damage	1	
Ret	73	(Spain) Álex Márquez	Kalex	6	Accident Damage	2	
Ret	62	(Italy) Stefano Manzi	Suter	1	Accident	27	
Ret	40	(Spain) Augusto Fernández	Kalex	0	Accident	9	
Ret	23	(Germany) Marcel Schrötter	Kalex	0	Accident	10	
Ret	36	(Spain) Joan Mir	Kalex	0	Accident	11	
OFFICIAL MOTO2 REPORT

=== Moto3 ===
Pos.	No.	Rider	Manufacturer	Laps	Time/Retired	Grid	Points
1	21	(Italy) Fabio Di Giannantonio	Honda	22	38:10.789	9	25
2	48	(Italy) Lorenzo Dalla Porta	Honda	22	+0.135	10	20
3	10	(Italy) Dennis Foggia	KTM	22	+0.466	25	16
4	88	(Spain) Jorge Martín	Honda	22	+0.980	13	13
5	19	(Argentina) Gabriel Rodrigo	KTM	22	+1.084	20	11
6	77	(Spain) Vicente Pérez	KTM	22	+1.232	12	10
7	8	(Italy) Nicolò Bulega	KTM	22	+1.312	7	9
8	42	(Spain) Marcos Ramírez	KTM	22	+1.440	16	8
9	35	(Thailand) Somkiat Chantra	Honda	22	+1.643	24	7
10	84	(Czech Republic) Jakub Kornfeil	KTM	22	+1.718	23	6
11	16	(Italy) Andrea Migno	KTM	22	+3.386	28	5
12	27	(Japan) Kaito Toba	Honda	22	+3.613	26	4
13	65	(Germany) Philipp Öttl	KTM	22	+4.130	18	3
14	14	(Italy) Tony Arbolino	Honda	22	+4.319	4	2
15	7	(Malaysia) Adam Norrodin	Honda	22	+4.657	22	1
16	9	(Thailand) Apiwat Wongthananon	KTM	22	+4.802	15	
17	5	(Spain) Jaume Masiá	KTM	22	+4.884	2	
18	52	(Spain) Jeremy Alcoba	Honda	22	+23.915	29	
19	81	(Italy) Stefano Nepa	KTM	22	+23.964	27	
20	22	(Japan) Kazuki Masaki	KTM	22	+59.390	3	
NC	12	(Italy) Marco Bezzecchi	KTM	22	+1:13.285 (Note: Not classified due to finishing the race through pits.)	1	
Ret	33	(Italy) Enea Bastianini	Honda	21	Collision	8	
Ret	17	(United Kingdom) John McPhee	KTM	20	Accident	19	
Ret	41	(Thailand) Nakarin Atiratphuvapat	Honda	19	Accident	21	
Ret	71	(Japan) Ayumu Sasaki	Honda	13	Accident	11	
Ret	75	(Spain) Albert Arenas	KTM	6	Collision Damage	17	
Ret	23	(Italy) Niccolò Antonelli	Honda	4	Collision	5	
Ret	24	(Japan) Tatsuki Suzuki	Honda	4	Collision	14	
Ret	40	(South Africa) Darryn Binder	KTM	3	Collision	6	
Ret	72	(Spain) Alonso López	Honda	3	Accident	30	
OFFICIAL MOTO3 REPORT

== Championship standings after the race ==
=== MotoGP ===
Pos.	Rider	Points
1	(Spain) Marc Márquez	271
2	(Italy) Andrea Dovizioso	194
3	(Italy) Valentino Rossi	172
4	(Spain) Maverick Viñales	146
5	(Spain) Jorge Lorenzo	130
6	(United Kingdom) Cal Crutchlow	128
7	(Italy) Danilo Petrucci	126
8	(France) Johann Zarco	123
9	(Italy) Andrea Iannone	113
10	(Spain) Álex Rins	102

=== Moto2 ===
Pos.	Rider	Points
1	(Italy) Francesco Bagnaia	259
2	(Portugal) Miguel Oliveira	231
3	(South Africa) Brad Binder	157
4	(Italy) Lorenzo Baldassarri	132
5	(Spain) Álex Márquez	126
6	(Spain) Joan Mir	124
7	(Germany) Marcel Schrötter	118
8	(Italy) Mattia Pasini	113
9	(France) Fabio Quartararo	111
10	(Italy) Luca Marini	104

=== Moto3 ===
Pos.	Rider	Points
1	(Spain) Jorge Martín	204
2	(Italy) Marco Bezzecchi	178
3	(Italy) Fabio Di Giannantonio	175
4	(Italy) Enea Bastianini	133
5	(Spain) Arón Canet	118
6	(Italy) Lorenzo Dalla Porta	111
7	(Argentina) Gabriel Rodrigo	108
8	(Czech Republic) Jakub Kornfeil	102
9	(Spain) Marcos Ramírez	86
10	(Italy) Andrea Migno	76

== Notes ==
Previous race: 2018 Aragon Grand Prix	FIM Grand Prix World Championship; 2018 season	Next race: 2018 Japanese Grand Prix
Previous race: None	Thailand motorcycle Grand Prix	Next race: 2019 Thailand Grand Prix
