= 2018 Aragon motorcycle Grand Prix =

2018 Aragon Grand Prix
Race details
- Race 14 of 19 races in the 2018 Grand Prix motorcycle racing season
- Date: 23 September 2018
- Official name: Gran Premio Movistar de Aragón
- Location: MotorLand Aragón, Alcañiz, Spain
- Course: Permanent racing facility; 5.077 km (3.155 mi)

MotoGP
Pole position
Rider	(Spain) Jorge Lorenzo	Ducati
Time	1:46.881	
Fastest lap
Rider	(Italy) Andrea Dovizioso	Ducati
Time	1:48.385 on lap 12	
Podium
First	(Spain) Marc Márquez	Honda
Second	(Italy) Andrea Dovizioso	Ducati
Third	(Italy) Andrea Iannone	Suzuki

Moto2
Pole position
Rider	(South Africa) Brad Binder	KTM
Time	1:53.149	
Fastest lap
Rider	(Spain) Alex Márquez	Kalex
Time	1:53.479 on lap 2	
Podium
First	(South Africa) Brad Binder	KTM
Second	(Italy) Francesco Bagnaia	Kalex
Third	(Italy) Lorenzo Baldassarri	Kalex

Moto3
Pole position
Rider	(Spain) Jorge Martín	Honda
Time	1:57.066	
Fastest lap
Rider	(Spain) Jaume Masiá	KTM
Time	1:58.540 on lap 6	
Podium
First	(Spain) Jorge Martín	Honda
Second	(Italy) Marco Bezzecchi	KTM
Third	(Italy) Enea Bastianini	Honda

The 2018 Aragon motorcycle Grand Prix was the fourteenth round of the 2018 MotoGP season. It was held at the MotorLand Aragón in Alcañiz on 23 September 2018.

== Classification ==
=== MotoGP ===
Pos.	No.	Rider	Team	Manufacturer	Laps	Time/Retired	Grid	Points
1	93	(Spain) Marc Márquez	Repsol Honda Team	Honda	23	41:55.949	3	25
2	4	(Italy) Andrea Dovizioso	Ducati Team	Ducati	23	+0.648	2	20
3	29	(Italy) Andrea Iannone	Team Suzuki Ecstar	Suzuki	23	+1.259	5	16
4	42	(Spain) Álex Rins	Team Suzuki Ecstar	Suzuki	23	+2.638	9	13
5	26	(Spain) Dani Pedrosa	Repsol Honda Team	Honda	23	+5.274	6	11
6	41	(Spain) Aleix Espargaró	Aprilia Racing Team Gresini	Aprilia	23	+9.396	13	10
7	9	(Italy) Danilo Petrucci	Alma Pramac Racing	Ducati	23	+14.285	7	9
8	46	(Italy) Valentino Rossi	Movistar Yamaha MotoGP	Yamaha	23	+15.199	17	8
9	43	(Australia) Jack Miller	Alma Pramac Racing	Ducati	23	+16.375	10	7
10	25	(Spain) Maverick Viñales	Movistar Yamaha MotoGP	Yamaha	23	+22.457	14 (Note: 3-place grid penalty.)	6
11	21	(Italy) Franco Morbidelli	EG 0,0 Marc VDS	Honda	23	+27.025	19 (Note: 6-place grid penalty.)	5
12	30	(Japan) Takaaki Nakagami	LCR Honda Idemitsu	Honda	23	+27.957	11	4
13	38	(United Kingdom) Bradley Smith	Red Bull KTM Factory Racing	KTM	23	+28.821	15	3
14	5	(France) Johann Zarco	Monster Yamaha Tech 3	Yamaha	23	+32.345	12	2
15	17	(Czech Republic) Karel Abraham	Ángel Nieto Team	Ducati	23	+37.639	16	1
16	45	(United Kingdom) Scott Redding	Aprilia Racing Team Gresini	Aprilia	23	+39.585	21	
17	12	(Switzerland) Thomas Lüthi	EG 0,0 Marc VDS	Honda	23	+40.763	20	
18	55	(Malaysia) Hafizh Syahrin	Monster Yamaha Tech 3	Yamaha	23	+56.296	18	
19	10	(Belgium) Xavier Siméon	Reale Avintia Racing	Ducati	23	+58.981	22	
20	81	(Spain) Jordi Torres	Reale Avintia Racing	Ducati	23	+59.513	23	
Ret	35	(United Kingdom) Cal Crutchlow	LCR Honda Castrol	Honda	4	Accident	4	
Ret	19	(Spain) Álvaro Bautista	Ángel Nieto Team	Ducati	1	Accident	8	
Ret	99	(Spain) Jorge Lorenzo	Ducati Team	Ducati	0	Accident	1	
DNS	44	(Spain) Pol Espargaró	Red Bull KTM Factory Racing	KTM		Did not start		
Sources:

- Pol Espargaró suffered a broken left collarbone in a crash during practice and withdrew from the event.

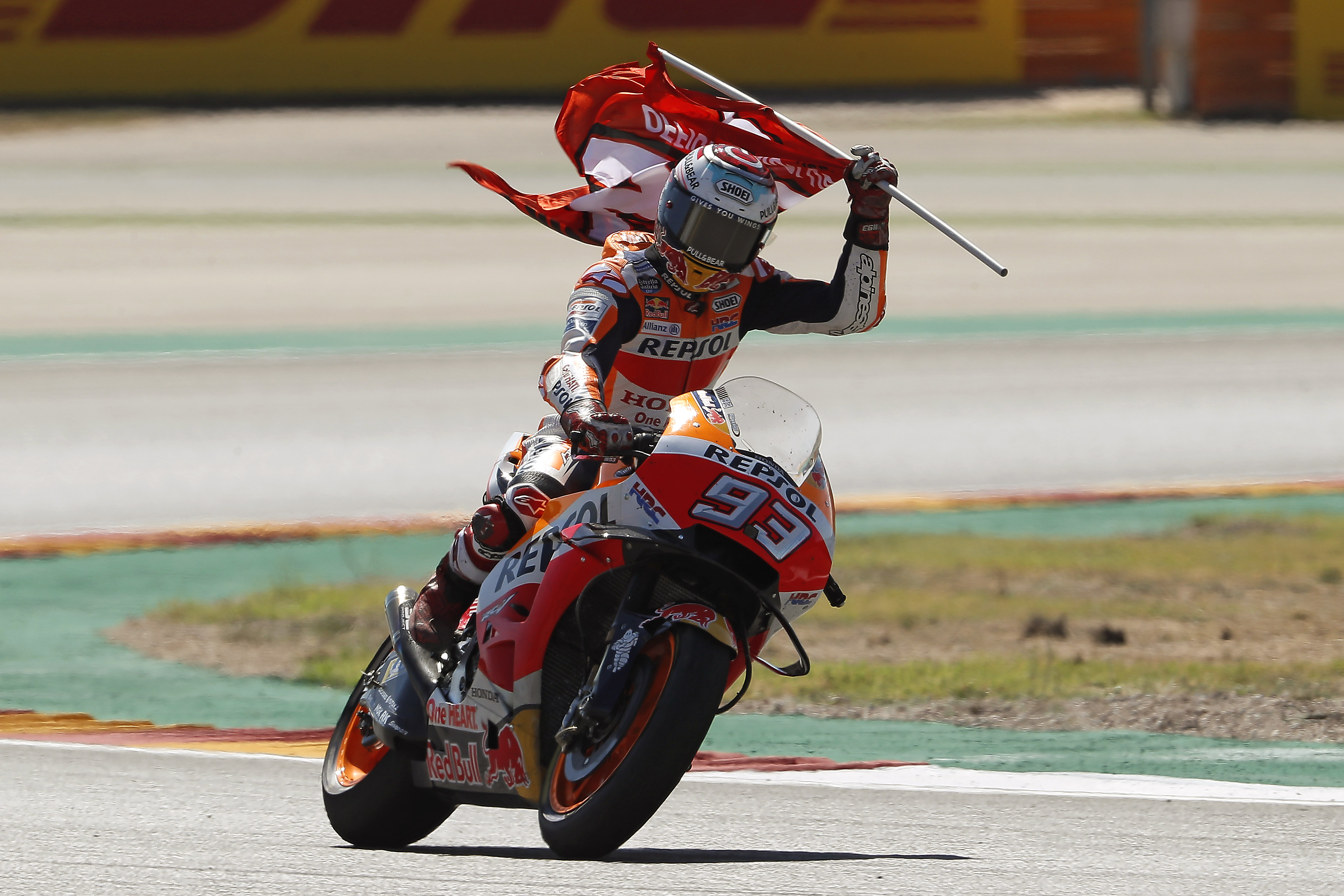
Marc Márquez, waving his flag after winning the MotoGP race.

=== Moto2 ===
Pos.	No.	Rider	Manufacturer	Laps	Time/Retired	Grid	Points
1	41	(South Africa) Brad Binder	KTM	21	39:59.247	1	25
2	42	(Italy) Francesco Bagnaia	Kalex	21	+1.526	5	20
3	7	(Italy) Lorenzo Baldassarri	Kalex	21	+2.055	8	16
4	73	(Spain) Álex Márquez	Kalex	21	+2.396	4	13
5	23	(Germany) Marcel Schrötter	Kalex	21	+5.850	2	11
6	36	(Spain) Joan Mir	Kalex	21	+6.205	15	10
7	44	(Portugal) Miguel Oliveira	KTM	21	+6.741	18	9
8	54	(Italy) Mattia Pasini	Kalex	21	+9.650	6	8
9	20	(France) Fabio Quartararo	Speed Up	21	+9.746	7	7
10	9	(Spain) Jorge Navarro	Kalex	21	+9.848	3	6
11	10	(Italy) Luca Marini	Kalex	21	+11.568	10	5
12	24	(Italy) Simone Corsi	Kalex	21	+13.786	9	4
13	40	(Spain) Augusto Fernández	Kalex	21	+17.856	11	3
14	27	(Spain) Iker Lecuona	KTM	21	+19.232	13	2
15	45	(Japan) Tetsuta Nagashima	Kalex	21	+21.258	14	1
16	5	(Italy) Andrea Locatelli	Kalex	21	+21.393	16	
17	57	(Spain) Edgar Pons	Kalex	21	+26.553	17	
18	4	(South Africa) Steven Odendaal	NTS	21	+27.747	21	
19	87	(Australia) Remy Gardner	Tech 3	21	+28.339	20	
20	22	(United Kingdom) Sam Lowes	KTM	21	+31.826	19	
21	77	(Switzerland) Dominique Aegerter	KTM	21	+32.214	29	
22	66	(Finland) Niki Tuuli	Kalex	21	+34.961	27	
23	2	(Switzerland) Jesko Raffin	Kalex	21	+36.569	24	
24	16	(United States) Joe Roberts	NTS	21	+37.143	26	
25	64	(Netherlands) Bo Bendsneyder	Tech 3	21	+42.222	25	
26	95	(France) Jules Danilo	Kalex	21	+53.557	30	
27	89	(Malaysia) Khairul Idham Pawi	Kalex	21	+53.675	22	
28	18	(Andorra) Xavi Cardelús	Kalex	21	+1:14.999	33	
Ret	97	(Spain) Xavi Vierge	Kalex	14	Accident	12	
Ret	21	(Italy) Federico Fuligni	Kalex	14	Handling	31	
Ret	52	(United Kingdom) Danny Kent	Speed Up	3	Accident	23	
Ret	12	(Portugal) Sheridan Morais	Kalex	3	Retired	32	
Ret	62	(Italy) Stefano Manzi	Suter	1	Accident Damage	28	
DNS	32	(Spain) Isaac Viñales	Suter		Did not start		
OFFICIAL MOTO2 REPORT

- Isaac Viñales withdrew from the event due to a hand injury suffered during the previous round at Misano.

=== Moto3 ===
Pos.	No.	Rider	Manufacturer	Laps	Time/Retired	Grid	Points
1	88	(Spain) Jorge Martín	Honda	19	37:49.030	1	25
2	12	(Italy) Marco Bezzecchi	KTM	19	+5.984	18 (Note: 12-place grid penalty.)	20
3	33	(Italy) Enea Bastianini	Honda	19	+6.045	15	16
4	21	(Italy) Fabio Di Giannantonio	Honda	19	+6.095	4	13
5	42	(Spain) Marcos Ramírez	KTM	19	+6.161	6	11
6	24	(Japan) Tatsuki Suzuki	Honda	19	+6.269	8	10
7	75	(Spain) Albert Arenas	KTM	19	+6.540	7	9
8	7	(Malaysia) Adam Norrodin	Honda	19	+10.292	5	8
9	5	(Spain) Jaume Masiá	KTM	19	+10.329	2	7
10	17	(United Kingdom) John McPhee	KTM	19	+10.537	10	6
11	84	(Czech Republic) Jakub Kornfeil	KTM	19	+10.679	26 (Note: Back of the grid start penalty.)	5
12	16	(Italy) Andrea Migno	KTM	19	+11.923	27	4
13	48	(Italy) Lorenzo Dalla Porta	Honda	19	+11.972	22	3
14	8	(Italy) Nicolò Bulega	KTM	19	+12.013	21	2
15 (Note: 1-place penalty.)	77	(Spain) Vicente Pérez	KTM	19	+12.007	11	1
16	14	(Italy) Tony Arbolino	Honda	19	+12.484	16	
17	25	(Spain) Raúl Fernández	KTM	19	+12.656	23	
18	40	(South Africa) Darryn Binder	KTM	19	+14.642	13	
19	65	(Germany) Philipp Öttl	KTM	19	+17.090	9	
20	72	(Spain) Alonso López	Honda	19	+34.967	12	
21	22	(Japan) Kazuki Masaki	KTM	19	+35.000	24	
22	81	(Italy) Stefano Nepa	KTM	19	+35.022	14	
23	52	(Spain) Jeremy Alcoba	Honda	19	+35.200	28	
24	41	(Thailand) Nakarin Atiratphuvapat	Honda	19	+54.907	19	
25	10	(Italy) Dennis Foggia	KTM	19	+43.866	29 (Note: Pit lane start penalty.)	
26	27	(Japan) Kaito Toba	Honda	19	+54.982	17	
Ret	19	(Argentina) Gabriel Rodrigo	KTM	17	Accident	20	
Ret	23	(Italy) Niccolò Antonelli	Honda	16	Accident	25	
Ret	44	(Spain) Arón Canet	Honda	11	Rider In Pain	3	
OFFICIAL MOTO3 REPORT

== Championship standings after the race ==
=== MotoGP ===
Pos.	Rider	Points
1	(Spain) Marc Márquez	246
2	(Italy) Andrea Dovizioso	174
3	(Italy) Valentino Rossi	159
4	(Spain) Jorge Lorenzo	130
5	(Spain) Maverick Viñales	130
6	(United Kingdom) Cal Crutchlow	119
7	(Italy) Danilo Petrucci	119
8	(France) Johann Zarco	112
9	(Italy) Andrea Iannone	108
10	(Spain) Álex Rins	92

=== Moto2 ===
Pos.	Rider	Points
1	(Italy) Francesco Bagnaia	234
2	(Portugal) Miguel Oliveira	215
3	(South Africa) Brad Binder	144
4	(Italy) Lorenzo Baldassarri	132
5	(Spain) Álex Márquez	126
6	(Spain) Joan Mir	124
7	(Germany) Marcel Schrötter	118
8	(Italy) Mattia Pasini	103
9	(France) Fabio Quartararo	100
10	(Spain) Xavi Vierge	96

=== Moto3 ===
Pos.	Rider	Points
1	(Spain) Jorge Martín	191
2	(Italy) Marco Bezzecchi	178
3	(Italy) Fabio Di Giannantonio	150
4	(Italy) Enea Bastianini	133
5	(Spain) Arón Canet	118
6	(Argentina) Gabriel Rodrigo	97
7	(Czech Republic) Jakub Kornfeil	96
8	(Italy) Lorenzo Dalla Porta	91
9	(Spain) Marcos Ramírez	78
10	(Italy) Andrea Migno	71

== Notes ==
Previous race: 2018 San Marino Grand Prix	FIM Grand Prix World Championship; 2018 season	Next race: 2018 Thailand Grand Prix
Previous race: 2017 Aragon Grand Prix	Aragon motorcycle Grand Prix	Next race: 2019 Aragon Grand Prix
