= 2017 Aragon motorcycle Grand Prix =

2017 Aragon Grand Prix
Race details
- Race 14 of 18 races in the 2017 Grand Prix motorcycle racing season
- Date: September 24, 2017
- Official name: Gran Premio Movistar de Aragón
- Location: MotorLand Aragón
- Course: Permanent racing facility; 5.077 km (3.155 mi)

MotoGP
Pole position
Rider	(Spain) Maverick Viñales	Yamaha
Time	1:47.635	
Fastest lap
Rider	(Spain) Dani Pedrosa	Honda
Time	1:49.140 on lap 19	
Podium
First	(Spain) Marc Márquez	Honda
Second	(Spain) Dani Pedrosa	Honda
Third	(Spain) Jorge Lorenzo	Ducati

Moto2
Pole position
Rider	(Portugal) Miguel Oliveira	KTM
Time	1:53.736	
Fastest lap
Rider	(Italy) Mattia Pasini	Kalex
Time	1:54.082 on lap 11	
Podium
First	(Italy) Franco Morbidelli	Kalex
Second	(Italy) Mattia Pasini	Kalex
Third	(Portugal) Miguel Oliveira	KTM

Moto3
Pole position
Rider	(Spain) Jorge Martín	Honda
Time	1:58.067	
Fastest lap
Rider	(Italy) Fabio Di Giannantonio	Honda
Time	1:58.347 on lap 6	
Podium
First	(Spain) Joan Mir	Honda
Second	(Italy) Fabio Di Giannantonio	Honda
Third	(Italy) Enea Bastianini	Honda

The 2017 Aragon motorcycle Grand Prix was the fourteenth round of the 2017 MotoGP season. It was held at the MotorLand Aragón in Alcañiz on September 24, 2017. This was the 900th race to contribute to the Grand Prix motorcycle racing championship.

== Classification ==
=== MotoGP ===
Pos.	No.	Rider	Team	Manufacturer	Laps	Time/Retired	Grid	Points
1	93	(Spain) Marc Márquez	Repsol Honda Team	Honda	23	42:06.816	5	25
2	26	(Spain) Dani Pedrosa	Repsol Honda Team	Honda	23	+0.879	6	20
3	99	(Spain) Jorge Lorenzo	Ducati Team	Ducati	23	+2.028	2	16
4	25	(Spain) Maverick Viñales	Movistar Yamaha MotoGP	Yamaha	23	+5.256	1	13
5	46	(Italy) Valentino Rossi	Movistar Yamaha MotoGP	Yamaha	23	+5.882	3	11
6	41	(Spain) Aleix Espargaró	Aprilia Racing Team Gresini	Aprilia	23	+6.962	8	10
7	4	(Italy) Andrea Dovizioso	Ducati Team	Ducati	23	+7.455	7	9
8	19	(Spain) Álvaro Bautista	Pull&Bear Aspar Team	Ducati	23	+7.910	9	8
9	5	(France) Johann Zarco	Monster Yamaha Tech 3	Yamaha	23	+13.002	11	7
10	44	(Spain) Pol Espargaró	Red Bull KTM Factory Racing	KTM	23	+14.075	14	6
11	36	(Finland) Mika Kallio	Red Bull KTM Factory Racing	KTM	23	+17.192	12	5
12	29	(Italy) Andrea Iannone	Team Suzuki Ecstar	Suzuki	23	+20.632	10	4
13	43	(Australia) Jack Miller	EG 0,0 Marc VDS	Honda	23	+23.886	13	3
14	45	(United Kingdom) Scott Redding	Octo Pramac Racing	Ducati	23	+25.523	22	2
15	53	(Spain) Tito Rabat	EG 0,0 Marc VDS	Honda	23	+26.082	21	1
16	94	(Germany) Jonas Folger	Monster Yamaha Tech 3	Yamaha	23	+30.302	18	
17	42	(Spain) Álex Rins	Team Suzuki Ecstar	Suzuki	23	+31.874	20	
18	8	(Spain) Héctor Barberá	Reale Avintia Racing	Ducati	23	+31.948	19	
19	38	(United Kingdom) Bradley Smith	Red Bull KTM Factory Racing	KTM	23	+36.296	23	
20	9	(Italy) Danilo Petrucci	Octo Pramac Racing	Ducati	23	+37.842	16	
21	76	(France) Loris Baz	Reale Avintia Racing	Ducati	23	+47.599	17	
22	22	(United Kingdom) Sam Lowes	Aprilia Racing Team Gresini	Aprilia	23	+47.647	24	
Ret	35	(United Kingdom) Cal Crutchlow	LCR Honda	Honda	16	Accident	4	
Ret	17	(Czech Republic) Karel Abraham	Pull&Bear Aspar Team	Ducati	10	Accident Damage	15	

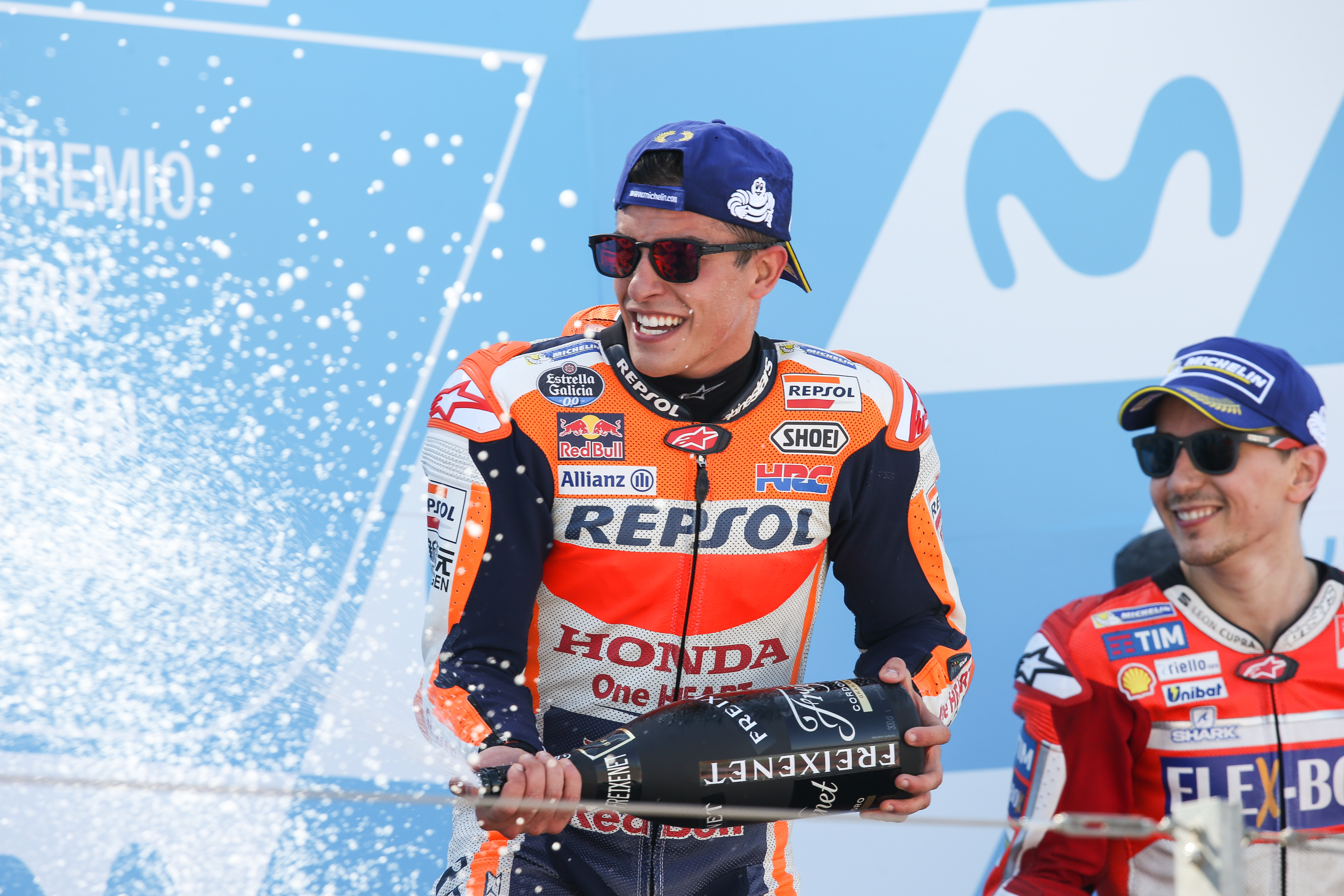
Marc Márquez, spraying the champagne on the podium after winning the MotoGP race. Next to him is Jorge Lorenzo, who finished third.

=== Moto2 ===
Pos.	No.	Rider	Manufacturer	Laps	Time/Retired	Grid	Points
1	21	(Italy) Franco Morbidelli	Kalex	21	40:09.904	4	25
2	54	(Italy) Mattia Pasini	Kalex	21	+0.145	2	20
3	44	(Portugal) Miguel Oliveira	KTM	21	+0.577	1	16
4	12	(Switzerland) Thomas Lüthi	Kalex	21	+4.181	7	13
5	41	(South Africa) Brad Binder	KTM	21	+4.331	20	11
6	9	(Spain) Jorge Navarro	Kalex	21	+7.328	6	10
7	24	(Italy) Simone Corsi	Speed Up	21	+7.597	5	9
8	30	(Japan) Takaaki Nakagami	Kalex	21	+7.630	10	8
9	11	(Germany) Sandro Cortese	Suter	21	+10.973	9	7
10	42	(Italy) Francesco Bagnaia	Kalex	21	+12.657	12	6
11	40	(France) Fabio Quartararo	Kalex	21	+12.904	14	5
12	77	(Switzerland) Dominique Aegerter	Suter	21	+16.107	11	4
13	7	(Italy) Lorenzo Baldassarri	Kalex	21	+21.243	16	3
14	97	(Spain) Xavi Vierge	Tech 3	21	+21.314	25	2
15	62	(Italy) Stefano Manzi	Kalex	21	+22.583	27	1
16	55	(Malaysia) Hafizh Syahrin	Kalex	21	+22.601	18	
17	57	(Spain) Edgar Pons	Kalex	21	+25.622	19	
18	45	(Japan) Tetsuta Nagashima	Kalex	21	+27.244	24	
19	5	(Italy) Andrea Locatelli	Kalex	21	+27.374	26	
20	87	(Australia) Remy Gardner	Tech 3	21	+28.026	17	
21	27	(Spain) Iker Lecuona	Kalex	21	+29.042	28	
22	37	(Spain) Augusto Fernández	Speed Up	21	+30.890	22	
23	2	(Switzerland) Jesko Raffin	Kalex	21	+31.765	30	
24	4	(South Africa) Steven Odendaal	NTS	21	+36.918	23	
25	19	(Belgium) Xavier Siméon	Kalex	21	+37.042	21	
26	20	(United States) Joe Roberts	Kalex	21	+38.275	31	
27	6	(United Kingdom) Tarran Mackenzie	Suter	21	+49.354	33	
Ret	23	(Germany) Marcel Schrötter	Suter	17	Rider In Pain	8	
Ret	22	(Italy) Federico Fuligni	Kalex	17	Retired	34	
Ret	89	(Malaysia) Khairul Idham Pawi	Kalex	15	Retired	32	
Ret	32	(Spain) Isaac Viñales	Kalex	15	Accident	29	
Ret	73	(Spain) Álex Márquez	Kalex	11	Rider In Pain	3	
Ret	10	(Italy) Luca Marini	Kalex	9	Accident	13	
Ret	49	(Spain) Axel Pons	Kalex	7	Accident	15	
OFFICIAL MOTO2 REPORT

=== Moto3 ===
The race was shortened from 20 to 13 laps due to the Sunday warm-up sessions being delayed because of fog covering the track.

Pos.	No.	Rider	Manufacturer	Laps	Time/Retired	Grid	Points
1	36	(Spain) Joan Mir	Honda	13	25:57.607	6	25
2	21	(Italy) Fabio Di Giannantonio	Honda	13	+0.043	14	20
3	33	(Italy) Enea Bastianini	Honda	13	+0.051	2	16
4	88	(Spain) Jorge Martín	Honda	13	+0.170	1	13
5	44	(Spain) Arón Canet	Honda	13	+0.392	3	11
6	17	(United Kingdom) John McPhee	Honda	13	+0.590	7	10
7	42	(Spain) Marcos Ramírez	KTM	13	+0.707	10	9
8	10	(Italy) Dennis Foggia	KTM	13	+0.743	5	8
9	65	(Germany) Philipp Öttl	KTM	13	+1.168	8	7
10	5	(Italy) Romano Fenati	Honda	13	+1.298	11	6
11	16	(Italy) Andrea Migno	KTM	13	+1.330	28 (Note: 12-place grid penalty.)	5
12	58	(Spain) Juan Francisco Guevara	KTM	13	+1.505	19	4
13	24	(Japan) Tatsuki Suzuki	Honda	13	+1.961	9	3
14	8	(Italy) Nicolò Bulega	KTM	13	+2.050	4	2
15	7	(Malaysia) Adam Norrodin	Honda	13	+2.504	13	1
16	71	(Japan) Ayumu Sasaki	Honda	13	+2.539	17	
17	64	(Netherlands) Bo Bendsneyder	KTM	13	+2.659	18	
18	23	(Italy) Niccolò Antonelli	KTM	13	+2.665	20	
19	12	(Italy) Marco Bezzecchi	Mahindra	13	+4.399	16	
20	95	(France) Jules Danilo	Honda	13	+11.404	15	
21	15	(Spain) Jaume Masiá	KTM	13	+14.540	30	
22	40	(South Africa) Darryn Binder	KTM	13	+14.599	32	
23	96	(Italy) Manuel Pagliani	Mahindra	13	+14.703	23	
24	37	(Spain) Aaron Polanco	Honda	13	+14.859	24	
25	84	(Czech Republic) Jakub Kornfeil	Peugeot	13	+17.595	22	
26	14	(Italy) Tony Arbolino	Honda	13	+17.722	25	
27	75	(Spain) Albert Arenas	Mahindra	13	+21.467	21	
28	27	(Japan) Kaito Toba	Honda	13	+34.646	27	
29	4	(Finland) Patrik Pulkkinen	Peugeot	13	+34.678	29	
Ret	19	(Argentina) Gabriel Rodrigo	KTM	8	Accident	12	
Ret	48	(Italy) Lorenzo Dalla Porta	Mahindra	7	Accident	31	
Ret	41	(Thailand) Nakarin Atiratphuvapat	Honda	2	Accident	26	
DNS	6	(Spain) María Herrera	KTM		Did not start		
OFFICIAL MOTO3 REPORT

- María Herrera withdrew from the event before the qualifying session due to effects of the broken collarbone suffered at Misano.

== Championship standings after the race ==
=== MotoGP ===
Below are the standings for the top five riders and constructors after round fourteen has concluded.

Riders' Championship standings

Pos.	Rider	Points
1	(Spain) Marc Márquez	224
2	(Italy) Andrea Dovizioso	208
3	(Spain) Maverick Viñales	196
4	(Spain) Dani Pedrosa	170
5	(Italy) Valentino Rossi	168

Constructors' Championship standings

Pos.	Constructor	Points
1	(Japan) Honda	274
2	(Japan) Yamaha	257
3	(Italy) Ducati	248
4	(Japan) Suzuki	64
5	(Italy) Aprilia	55

- Note: Only the top five positions are included for both sets of standings.

=== Moto2 ===
Pos.	Rider	Points
1	(Italy) Franco Morbidelli	248
2	(Switzerland) Thomas Lüthi	232
3	(Portugal) Miguel Oliveira	157
4	(Spain) Álex Márquez	155
5	(Italy) Francesco Bagnaia	133
6	(Italy) Mattia Pasini	124
7	(Japan) Takaaki Nakagami	118
8	(Italy) Simone Corsi	96
9	(Malaysia) Hafizh Syahrin	70
10	(South Africa) Brad Binder	69

=== Moto3 ===
Pos.	Rider	Points
1	(Spain) Joan Mir	271
2	(Italy) Romano Fenati	191
3	(Spain) Arón Canet	173
4	(Italy) Fabio Di Giannantonio	137
5	(Spain) Jorge Martín	134
6	(United Kingdom) John McPhee	106
7	(Spain) Marcos Ramírez	105
8	(Italy) Andrea Migno	103
9	(Italy) Enea Bastianini	103
10	(Germany) Philipp Öttl	91

== Notes ==
Previous race: 2017 San Marino Grand Prix	FIM Grand Prix World Championship; 2017 season	Next race: 2017 Japanese Grand Prix
Previous race: 2016 Aragon Grand Prix	Aragon motorcycle Grand Prix	Next race: 2018 Aragon Grand Prix
