= 2025 Malaysian motorcycle Grand Prix =

Motorcycle races in Sepang

(Malaysia) 2025 Malaysian Grand Prix
Race details
- Race 20 of 22 races in the 2025 Grand Prix motorcycle racing season
- Date: 26 October 2025
- Official name: Petronas Grand Prix of Malaysia
- Location: Petronas Sepang International Circuit; Sepang, Selangor, Malaysia
- Course: Permanent racing facility; 5.543 km (3.444 mi)

MotoGP
Pole position
Rider	(Italy) Francesco Bagnaia	Ducati
Time	1:57.001	
Fastest lap
Rider	(Spain) Álex Márquez	Ducati
Time	1:58.873 on lap 2	
Podium
First	(Spain) Álex Márquez	Ducati
Second	(Spain) Pedro Acosta	KTM
Third	(Spain) Joan Mir	Honda

Moto2
Pole position
Rider	(Spain) Daniel Holgado	Kalex
Time	2:02.858	
Fastest lap
Rider	(United Kingdom) Jake Dixon	Boscoscuro
Time	2:04.512 on lap 2	
Podium
First	(United Kingdom) Jake Dixon	Boscoscuro
Second	(Colombia) David Alonso	Kalex
Third	(Belgium) Barry Baltus	Kalex

Moto3
Pole position
Rider	(Spain) David Almansa	Honda
Time	2:09.846	
Fastest lap
Rider	(Malaysia) Hakim Danish	KTM
Time	2:11.066 on lap 2	
Podium
First	(Japan) Taiyo Furusato	Honda
Second	(Spain) Ángel Piqueras	KTM
Third	(Spain) David Almansa	Honda

The 2025 Malaysian motorcycle Grand Prix (officially known as the Petronas Grand Prix of Malaysia) was the twentieth round of the 2025 Grand Prix motorcycle racing season. All races were held at the Petronas Sepang International Circuit in Sepang on 26 October 2025.

== Background ==
In this race, Yamaha Factory Racing again fielded Augusto Fernández as a wildcard to accelerate the development of the Yamaha YZR-M1 V4.

== Report ==
=== MotoGP ===
In the sprint race, Francesco Bagnaia finished first. Álex Márquez finished second, securing the runner-up spot in the standings. Fermín Aldeguer originally finished third but received a penalty due to illegal tyre pressures that dropped him to seventh, allowing Pedro Acosta to inherit third-place. Nevertheless, Aldeguer was able to secure enough points to become the 2025 MotoGP Rookie of the Year.

In the main race, Álex Márquez finished first, and Gresini Racing securing 2025 Best Independent Team.

=== Moto2 ===
On lap 2, the race was stopped (red flag) due to an accident experienced by Joe Roberts.

=== Moto3 ===
In the Moto3 race, an accident involving José Antonio Rueda and Noah Dettwiler on the sighting lap occurred. As a result, both riders were rushed to the hospital and the session was temporarily suspended. The schedule was also changed, resulting in the MotoGP race taking place before the Moto2 race. Taiyo Furusato managed to obtain his maiden Grand Prix win in the race, with Honda getting their first win of the season.

== Practice session ==
=== MotoGP ===
==== Combined Free Practice 1-2 ====
Practice times (written in bold) are the fastest times in the session.

Fastest session lap

Pos.	No.	Biker	Team	Constructor	Practice times	
Pos.	No.	Biker	Team	Constructor	FP1	FP2
1	10	(Italy) Luca Marini	Honda HRC Castrol	Honda	2:00.602	1:58.415
2	21	(Italy) Franco Morbidelli	Pertamina Enduro VR46 Racing Team	Ducati	2:01.163	1:58.422
3	63	(Italy) Francesco Bagnaia	Ducati Lenovo Team	Ducati	2:00.455	1:58.585
4	36	(Spain) Joan Mir	Honda HRC Castrol	Honda	2:00.548	1:58.692
5	54	(Spain) Fermín Aldeguer	BK8 Gresini Racing MotoGP	Ducati	2:00.199	1:58.724
6	20	(France) Fabio Quartararo	Monster Energy Yamaha MotoGP Team	Yamaha	2:00.733	1:58.728
7	73	(Spain) Álex Márquez	BK8 Gresini Racing MotoGP	Ducati	2:00.720	1:58.752
8	72	(Italy) Marco Bezzecchi	Aprilia Racing	Aprilia	2:00.591	1:58.788
9	5	(France) Johann Zarco	Castrol Honda LCR	Honda	2:01.313	1:58.852
10	37	(Spain) Pedro Acosta	Red Bull KTM Factory Racing	KTM	2:00.863	1:58.964
11	25	(Spain) Raúl Fernández	Trackhouse MotoGP Team	Aprilia	2:01.757	1:58.997
12	88	(Portugal) Miguel Oliveira	Prima Pramac Yamaha MotoGP	Yamaha	2:01.399	1:59.196
13	44	(Spain) Pol Espargaró	Red Bull KTM Tech3	Ducati	2:00.581	1:59.302
14	49	(Italy) Fabio Di Giannantonio	Pertamina Enduro VR46 Racing Team	Ducati	2:01.465	1:59.330
15	43	(Australia) Jack Miller	Prima Pramac Yamaha MotoGP	Yamaha	2:00.806	1:59.410
16	79	(Japan) Ai Ogura	Trackhouse MotoGP Team	Aprilia	2:01.275	1:59.489
17	33	(South Africa) Brad Binder	Red Bull KTM Factory Racing	KTM	2:01.261	1:59.506
18	23	(Italy) Enea Bastianini	Red Bull KTM Tech3	KTM	2:01.338	1:59.606
19	32	(Italy) Lorenzo Savadori	Aprilia Racing	Aprilia	2:02.838	1:59.909
20	42	(Spain) Álex Rins	Monster Energy Yamaha MotoGP Team	Yamaha	2:01.579	1:59.984
21	35	(Thailand) Somkiat Chantra	IDEMITSU Honda LCR	Honda	2:02.985	2:00.616
22	7	(Spain) Augusto Fernández	Yamaha Factory Team	Yamaha	2:02.952	2:00.768
23	51	(Italy) Michele Pirro	Ducati Lenovo Team	Ducati	2:02.396	2:01.164
OFFICIAL MOTOGP COMBINED PRACTICE TIMES REPORT

==== Practice ====
The top 10 riders (written in bold) qualified for Q2.

Fastest session lap

Pos.	No.	Biker	Team	Constructor	
Pos.	No.	Biker	Team	Constructor	Time results
1	37	(Spain) **Pedro Acosta**	**Red Bull KTM Factory Racing**	**KTM**	**1:57.559**
2	5	(France) **Johann Zarco**	**CASTROL Honda LCR**	**Honda**	**1:57.578**
3	43	(Australia) **Jack Miller**	**Prima Pramac Yamaha MotoGP**	**Yamaha**	**1:57.840**
4	36	(Spain) **Joan Mir**	**Honda HRC Castrol**	**Honda**	**1:57.854**
5	20	(France) **Fabio Quartararo**	**Monster Energy Yamaha MotoGP Team**	**Yamaha**	**1:57.868**
6	49	(Italy) **Fabio Di Giannantonio**	**Pertamina Enduro VR46 Racing Team**	**Ducati**	**1:58.039**
7	21	(Italy) **Franco Morbidelli**	**Pertamina Enduro VR46 Racing Team**	**Ducati**	**1:58.041**
8	44	(Spain) **Pol Espargaró**	**Red Bull KTM Tech3**	**KTM**	**1:58.055**
9	73	(Spain) **Álex Márquez**	**BK8 Gresini Racing MotoGP**	**Ducati**	**1:58.057**
10	42	(Spain) **Álex Rins**	**Monster Energy Yamaha MotoGP Team**	**Yamaha**	**1:58.117**
11	10	(Italy) Luca Marini	Honda HRC Castrol	Honda	1:58.179
12	63	(Italy) Francesco Bagnaia	Ducati Lenovo Team	Ducati	1:58.206
13	54	(Spain) Fermín Aldeguer	BK8 Gresini Racing MotoGP	Ducati	1:58.279
14	79	(Japan) Ai Ogura	Trackhouse MotoGP Team	Aprilia	1:58.300
15	72	(Italy) Marco Bezzecchi	Aprilia Racing	Aprilia	1:58.360
16	25	(Spain) Raúl Fernández	Trackhouse MotoGP Team	Aprilia	1:58.581
17	33	(South Africa) Brad Binder	Red Bull KTM Factory Racing	KTM	1:58.739
18	88	(Portugal) Miguel Oliveira	Prima Pramac Yamaha MotoGP	Yamaha	1:58.776
19	23	(Italy) Enea Bastianini	Red Bull KTM Tech3	KTM	1:58.953
20	35	(Thailand) Somkiat Chantra	IDEMITSU Honda LCR	Honda	1:58.964
21	32	(Italy) Lorenzo Savadori	Aprilia Racing	Aprilia	1:59.252
22	51	(Italy) Michele Pirro	Ducati Lenovo Team	Ducati	1:59.741
23	7	(Spain) Augusto Fernández	Yamaha Factory Racing Team	Yamaha	1:59.974
OFFICIAL MOTOGP PRACTICE TIMES REPORT

=== Moto2 ===
==== Combined Free Practice 1-2 ====
Practice times (written in bold) are the fastest times in the session.

Fastest session lap

Pos.	No.	Biker	Team	Constructor	Practice times	
Pos.	No.	Biker	Team	Constructor	FP1	FP2
1	96	(United Kingdom) Jake Dixon	Elf Marc VDS Racing Team	Boscoscuro	2:04.131	**2:03.633**
2	44	(Spain) Arón Canet	Fantic Racing Lino Sonego	Kalex	2:04.699	**2:03.642**
3	17	(Spain) Daniel Muñoz	Red Bull KTM Ajo	Kalex	2:05.525	**2:03.680**
4	75	(Spain) Albert Arenas	Italjet Gresini Moto2	Kalex	2:04.292	**2:03.729**
5	80	(Colombia) David Alonso	CFMoto RCB Aspar Team	Kalex	2:04.429	**2:03.786**
6	13	(Italy) Celestino Vietti	Sync SpeedRS Team	Boscoscuro	2:04.644	**2:04.033**
7	24	(Spain) Marcos Ramírez	OnlyFans American Racing Team	Kalex	2:05.351	**2:04.048**
8	28	(Spain) Izan Guevara	Blu Cru Pramac Yamaha Moto2	Boscoscuro	2:04.818	**2:04.102**
9	14	(Italy) Tony Arbolino	Blu Cru Pramac Yamaha Moto2	Boscoscuro	2:04.696	**2:04.198**
10	7	(Belgium) Barry Baltus	Fantic Racing Lino Sonego	Kalex	2:04.952	**2:04.219**
11	27	(Spain) Daniel Holgado	CFMoto RCB Aspar Team	Kalex	2:04.471	**2:04.254**
12	21	(Spain) Alonso López	Sync SpeedRS Team	Boscoscuro	2:05.831	**2:04.306**
13	10	(Brazil) Diogo Moreira	Italtrans Racing Team	Kalex	2:04.563	**2:04.345**
14	18	(Spain) Manuel González	Liqui Moly Dynavolt Intact GP	Kalex	2:04.881	**2:04.359**
15	16	(United States) Joe Roberts	OnlyFans American Racing Team	Kalex	2:05.507	**2:04.440**
16	15	(South Africa) Darryn Binder	Italjet Gresini Moto2	Kalex	2:05.616	**2:04.603**
17	12	(Czech Republic) Filip Salač	Elf Marc VDS Racing Team	Boscoscuro	2:05.050	**2:04.745**
18	64	(Indonesia) Mario Aji	Idemitsu Honda Team Asia	Kalex	2:05.089	**2:04.802**
19	99	(Spain) Adrián Huertas	Italtrans Racing Team	Kalex	2:06.470	**2:04.818**
20	9	(Spain) Jorge Navarro	Klint Forward Factory Team	Forward	2:05.513	**2:04.823**
21	84	(Netherlands) Zonta van den Goorbergh	RW-Idrofoglia Racing GP	Kalex	2:05.638	**2:04.865**
22	95	(Netherlands) Collin Veijer	Red Bull KTM Ajo	Kalex	2:05.375	**2:04.916**
23	11	(Spain) Álex Escrig	Klint Forward Factory Team	Forward	2:05.118	**2:04.974**
24	71	(Japan) Ayumu Sasaki	RW-Idrofoglia Racing GP	Kalex	2:05.982	**2:05.122**
25	81	(Australia) Senna Agius	Liqui Moly Dynavolt Intact GP	Kalex	**2:05.171**	2:05.252
26	4	(Spain) Iván Ortolá	QJMotor – Frinsa – MSi	Boscoscuro	2:05.220	**2:05.208**
27	92	(Japan) Yuki Kunii	Idemitsu Honda Team Asia	Kalex	2:07.201	**2:05.445**
28	20	(Malaysia) Azroy Anuar	Petronas MIE Racing RW	Kalex	2:08.023	**2:06.806**
29	29	(Australia) Harrison Voight	QJMotor – Frinsa – MSi	Boscoscuro	2:07.554	**2:06.813**
30	55	(Malaysia) Helmi Azman	Petronas MIE Racing RW	Kalex	2:08.933	**2:06.866**
OFFICIAL MOTO2 FREE PRACTICE TIMES REPORT

==== Practice ====
The top 14 riders (written in bold) qualified for Q2.

Fastest session lap

Pos.	No.	Biker	Team	Constructor	
Pos.	No.	Biker	Team	Constructor	Time results
1	18	(Spain) **Manuel González**	**Liqui Moly Dynavolt Intact GP**	**Kalex**	**2:04.166**
2	96	(United Kingdom) **Jake Dixon**	**Elf Marc VDS Racing Team**	**Boscoscuro**	2:04.218
3	75	(Spain) **Albert Arenas**	**Italjet Gresini Moto2**	**Kalex**	2:04.282
4	7	(Belgium) **Barry Baltus**	**Fantic Racing Lino Sonego**	**Kalex**	2:04.293
5	27	(Spain) **Daniel Holgado**	**CFMoto RCB Aspar Team**	**Kalex**	2:04.320
6	80	(Colombia) **David Alonso**	**CFMoto RCB Aspar Team**	**Kalex**	2:04.323
7	44	(Spain) **Arón Canet**	**Fantic Racing Lino Sonego**	**Kalex**	2:04.353
8	11	(Spain) **Álex Escrig**	**Klint Forward Factory Team**	**Forward**	2:04.462
9	14	(Italy) **Tony Arbolino**	**Blu Cru Pramac Yamaha Moto2**	**Boscoscuro**	2:04.557
10	10	(Brazil) **Diogo Moreira**	**Italtrans Racing Team**	**Kalex**	2:04.611
11	12	(Czech Republic) **Filip Salač**	**Elf Marc VDS Racing Team**	**Boscoscuro**	2:04.655
12	17	(Spain) **Daniel Muñoz**	**Red Bull KTM Ajo**	**Kalex**	2:04.719
13	28	(Spain) **Izan Guevara**	**Blu Cru Pramac Yamaha Moto2**	**Boscoscuro**	2:04.720
14	95	(Netherlands) **Collin Veijer**	**Red Bull KTM Ajo**	**Kalex**	2:04.766
15	81	(Australia) Senna Agius	Liqui Moly Dynavolt Intact GP	Kalex	2:04.771
16	4	(Spain) Iván Ortolá	QJMotor – Frinsa – MSi	Boscoscuro	2:04.881
17	84	(Netherlands) Zonta van den Goorbergh	RW-Idrofoglia Racing GP	Kalex	2:04.913
18	15	(South Africa) Darryn Binder	Italjet Gresini Moto2	Kalex	2:04.941
19	99	(Spain) Adrián Huertas	Italtrans Racing Team	Kalex	2:05.084
20	24	(Spain) Marcos Ramírez	OnlyFans American Racing Team	Kalex	2:05.110
21	9	(Spain) Jorge Navarro	Klint Forward Factory Team	Forward	2:05.154
22	21	(Spain) Alonso López	Sync SpeedRS Team	Boscoscuro	2:05.175
23	13	(Italy) Celestino Vietti	Sync SpeedRS Team	Boscoscuro	2:05.201
24	64	(Indonesia) Mario Aji	Idemitsu Honda Team Asia	Kalex	2:05.202
25	16	(United States) Joe Roberts	OnlyFans American Racing Team	Kalex	2:05.240
26	71	(Japan) Ayumu Sasaki	RW-Idrofoglia Racing GP	Kalex	2:05.274
27	92	(Japan) Yuki Kunii	Idemitsu Honda Team Asia	Kalex	2:05.611
28	29	(Australia) Harrison Voight	QJMotor – Frinsa – MSi	Boscoscuro	2:06.604
29	20	(Malaysia) Azroy Anuar	Petronas MIE Racing RW	Kalex	2:07.953
30	55	(Malaysia) Helmi Azman	Petronas MIE Racing RW	Kalex	2:08.279
OFFICIAL MOTO2 PRACTICE TIMES REPORT

=== Moto3 ===
==== Combined Free Practice 1-2 ====
Practice times (written in bold) are the fastest times in the session.

Fastest session lap

Pos.	No.	Biker	Team	Constructor	Practice times	
Pos.	No.	Biker	Team	Constructor	FP1	FP2
1	6	(Japan) Ryusei Yamanaka	Frinsa – MT Helmets – MSI	KTM	2:11.686	**2:10.160**
2	22	(Spain) David Almansa	Leopard Racing	Honda	2:11.289	**2:10.253**
3	31	(Spain) Adrián Fernández	Leopard Racing	Honda	2:11.352	**2:10.358**
4	36	(Spain) Ángel Piqueras	Frinsa – MT Helmets – MSI	KTM	2:10.979	**2:10.383**
5	99	(Spain) José Antonio Rueda	Red Bull KTM Ajo	KTM	2:11.154	**2:10.462**
6	13	(Malaysia) Hakim Danish	AEON Credit SIC Racing MSi	KTM	2:11.317	**2:10.576**
7	28	(Spain) Máximo Quiles	CFMoto Power Electronics Aspar Team	KTM	2:12.276	**2:10.621**
8	72	(Japan) Taiyo Furusato	Honda Team Asia	Honda	2:12.776	**2:10.622**
9	83	(Spain) Álvaro Carpe	Red Bull KTM Ajo	KTM	2:12.174	**2:10.744**
10	58	(Italy) Luca Lunetta	Sic58 Squadra Corse	Honda	2:11.625	**2:10.768**
11	73	(Argentina) Valentín Perrone	Red Bull KTM Tech3	KTM	2:11.994	**2:10.774**
12	94	(Italy) Guido Pini	Liqui Moly Dynavolt Intact GP	KTM	2:12.174	**2:10.791**
13	10	(Italy) Nicola Carraro	Rivacold Snipers Team	Honda	2:12.021	**2:10.947**
14	51	(Spain) Brian Uriarte	Liqui Moly Dynavolt Intact GP	KTM	2:11.310	**2:10.975**
15	54	(Italy) Riccardo Rossi	Rivacold Snipers Team	Honda	2:11.117	**2:10.981**
16	12	(Australia) Jacob Roulstone	Red Bull KTM Tech3	KTM	**2:11.031**	No time set^{1}
17	19	(United Kingdom) Scott Ogden	CIP Green Power	KTM	2:11.820	**2:11.043**
18	66	(Australia) Joel Kelso	LEVELUP-MTA	KTM	**2:11.085**	2:11.238
19	8	(United Kingdom) Eddie O'Shea	GRYD - Mlav Racing	Honda	2:12.079	**2:11.180**
20	18	(Italy) Matteo Bertelle	LEVELUP-MTA	KTM	2:13.323	**2:11.552**
21	95	(Argentina) Marco Morelli	GRYD - Mlav Racing	Honda	2:11.683	**2:11.602**
22	78	(Spain) Joel Esteban	CFMoto Power Electronics Aspar Team	KTM	2:12.309	**2:11.838**
23	21	(South Africa) Ruché Moodley	Denssi Racing – BOE	KTM	2:12.703	**2:11.864**
24	14	(New Zealand) Cormac Buchanan	Denssi Racing – BOE	KTM	2:12.797	**2:12.051**
25	82	(Italy) Stefano Nepa	Sic58 Squadra Corse	Honda	2:13.800	**2:12.144**
26	5	(Thailand) Tatchakorn Buasri	Honda Team Asia	Honda	2:12.932	**2:12.304**
27	55	(Switzerland) Noah Dettwiler	CIP Green Power	KTM	2:12.692	**2:12.639**
OFFICIAL MOTO3 FREE PRACTICE TIMES REPORT

Notes

- **^1** - Jacob Roulstone withdrew from the weekend after fracturing his hand in a crash on Friday.

==== Practice ====
The top 14 riders (written in bold) qualified for Q2.

Fastest session lap

Pos.	No.	Biker	Team	Constructor	
Pos.	No.	Biker	Team	Constructor	Time results
1	99	(Spain) **José Antonio Rueda**	**Red Bull KTM Ajo**	**KTM**	**2:11.152**
2	83	(Spain) **Álvaro Carpe**	**Red Bull KTM Ajo**	**KTM**	2:11.187
3	51	(Spain) **Brian Uriarte**	**Liqui Moly Dynavolt Intact GP**	**KTM**	2:11.202
4	36	(Spain) **Ángel Piqueras**	**Frinsa – MT Helmets – MSI**	**KTM**	2:11.264
5	22	(Spain) **David Almansa**	**Leopard Racing**	**Honda**	2:11.273
6	72	**(Japan) Taiyo Furusato**	**Honda Team Asia**	**Honda**	2:11.283
7	66	(Australia) **Joel Kelso**	**LEVELUP-MTA**	**KTM**	2:11.449
8	12	(Australia) **Jacob Roulstone**	**Red Bull KTM Tech3**	**KTM**	2:11.512
9	58	(Italy) **Luca Lunetta**	**Sic58 Squadra Corse**	**Honda**	2:11.623
10	19	(United Kingdom) **Scott Ogden**	**CIP Green Power**	**KTM**	2:11.664
11	13	(Malaysia) **Hakim Danish**	**AEON Credit SIC Racing MSI**	**KTM**	2:11.820
12	18	(Italy) **Matteo Bertelle**	**LEVELUP–MTA**	**KTM**	2:11.830
13	71	(United Kingdom) **Eddie O'Shea**	**GRYD - Mlav Racing**	**Honda**	2:11.879
14	31	(Spain) **Adrián Fernández**	**Leopard Racing**	**Honda**	2:11.885
15	28	(Spain) Máximo Quiles	CFMoto Power Electronics Aspar Team	KTM	2:11.916
16	94	(Italy) Guido Pini	Liqui Moly Dynavolt Intact GP	KTM	2:11.932
17	10	(Italy) Nicola Carraro	Rivacold Snipers Team	Honda	2:11.935
18	78	(Spain) Joel Esteban	CFMoto Power Electronics Aspar Team	KTM	2:12.034
19	6	(Japan) Ryusei Yamanaka	Frinsa – MT Helmets – MSI	KTM	2:12.118
20	54	(Italy) Riccardo Rossi	Rivacold Snipers Team	Honda	2:12.135
21	5	(Thailand) Tatchakorn Buasri	Honda Team Asia	Honda	2:12.313
22	73	(Argentina) Valentín Perrone	Red Bull KTM Tech3	KTM	2:12.335
23	95	(Argentina) Marco Morelli	GRYD - Mlav Racing	Honda	2:12.475
24	14	(New Zealand) Cormac Buchanan	Denssi Racing – BOE	KTM	2:12.541
25	21	(South Africa) Ruché Moodley	Denssi Racing – BOE	KTM	2:12.966
26	55	(Switzerland) Noah Dettwiler	CIP Green Power	KTM	2:13.164
27	82	(Italy) Stefano Nepa	Sic58 Squadra Corse	Honda	2:13.731
OFFICIAL MOTO3 PRACTICE TIMES REPORT

== Qualifying ==
=== MotoGP ===
Fastest session lap

Pos.	No.	Biker	Team	Constructor	Qualifying times		Final grid	Row
Pos.	No.	Biker	Team	Constructor	Q1	Q2	Final grid	Row
1	63	(Italy) Francesco Bagnaia	Ducati Lenovo Team	Ducati	1:57.190	1:57.001	1	1
2	73	(Spain) Álex Márquez	BK8 Gresini Racing MotoGP	Ducati	Qualified in Q2	1:57.017	2	1
3	21	(Italy) Franco Morbidelli	Pertamina Enduro VR46 Racing Team	Ducati	Qualified in Q2	1:57.159	3	1
4	20	(France) Fabio Quartararo	Monster Energy Yamaha MotoGP Team	Yamaha	Qualified in Q2	1:57.195	4	2
5	37	(Spain) Pedro Acosta	Red Bull KTM Factory Racing	KTM	Qualified in Q2	1:57.363	5	2
6	54	(Spain) Fermín Aldeguer	BK8 Gresini Racing MotoGP	Ducati	1:57.148	1:57.439	6	2
7	36	(Spain) Joan Mir	Honda HRC Castrol	Honda	Qualified in Q2	1:57.440	7	3
8	49	(Italy) Fabio Di Giannantonio	Pertamina Enduro VR46 Racing Team	Ducati	Qualified in Q2	1:57.522	8	3
9	5	(France) Johann Zarco	Castrol Honda LCR	Honda	Qualified in Q2	1:57.531	9	3
10	42	(Spain) Álex Rins	Monster Energy Yamaha MotoGP Team	Yamaha	Qualified in Q2	1:57.945	10	4
11	43	(Australia) Jack Miller	Prima Pramac Yamaha MotoGP	Yamaha	Qualified in Q2	1:57.949	11	4
12	44	(Spain) Pol Espargaró	Red Bull KTM Tech3	KTM	Qualified in Q2	1:58.174	12	4
13	10	(Italy) Luca Marini	Honda HRC Castrol	Honda	1:57.525	N/A	13	5
14	72	(Italy) Marco Bezzecchi	Aprilia Racing	Aprilia	1:57.549	N/A	14	5
15	25	(Spain) Raúl Fernández	Trackhouse MotoGP Team	Aprilia	1.57.776	N/A	15	5
16	88	(Portugal) Miguel Oliveira	Prima Pramac Yamaha MotoGP	Yamaha	1:57.894	N/A	16	6
17	79	(Japan) Ai Ogura	Trackhouse MotoGP Team	Aprilia	1:58.034	N/A	17	6
18	33	(South Africa) Brad Binder	Red Bull KTM Factory Racing	KTM	1:58.183	N/A	18	6
19	23	(Italy) Enea Bastianini	Red Bull KTM Tech3	KTM	1:58.189	N/A	19	7
20	35	(Thailand) Somkiat Chantra	IDEMITSU Honda LCR	Honda	1:58.623	N/A	20	7
21	32	(Italy) Lorenzo Savadori	Aprilia Racing	Aprilia	1:58.791	N/A	21	7
22	51	(Italy) Michele Pirro	Ducati Lenovo Team	Ducati	1:59.255	N/A	22	8
23	7	(Spain) Augusto Fernández	Yamaha Factory Racing Team	Yamaha	1:59.382	N/A	23	8
OFFICIAL MOTOGP QUALIFYING TIMES REPORT

=== Moto2 ===
Fastest session lap

Pos.	No.	Biker	Team	Constructor	Qualifying times		Final grid	Row
Pos.	No.	Biker	Team	Constructor	Q1	Q2	Final grid	Row
1	27	(Spain) Daniel Holgado	CFMoto RCB Aspar Team	Kalex	Qualified in Q2	2:02.858	1	1
2	7	(Belgium) Barry Baltus	Fantic Racing Lino Sonego	Kalex	Qualified in Q2	2:03.420	2	1
3	96	(United Kingdom) Jake Dixon	Elf Marc VDS Racing Team	Boscoscuro	Qualified in Q2	2:03.449	3	1
4	75	(Spain) Albert Arenas	Italjet Gresini Moto2	Kalex	Qualified in Q2	2:03.483	4	2
5	17	(Spain) Daniel Muñoz	Red Bull KTM Ajo	Kalex	Qualified in Q2	2:03.581	5	2
6	80	(Colombia) David Alonso	CFMoto RCB Aspar Team	Kalex	Qualified in Q2	2:03.586	6	2
7	18	(Spain) Manuel González	Liqui Moly Dynavolt Intact GP	Kalex	Qualified in Q2	2:03.605	7	3
8	44	(Spain) Arón Canet	Fantic Racing Lino Sonego	Kalex	Qualified in Q2	2:03.625	8	3
9	14	(Italy) Tony Arbolino	Blu Cru Pramac Yamaha Moto2	Boscoscuro	Qualified in Q2	2:03.709	9	3
10	11	(Spain) Álex Escrig	Klint Forward Factory Team	Forward	Qualified in Q2	2:03.851	10	4
11	16	(United States) Joe Roberts	OnlyFans American Racing Team	Kalex	2:03.982	2:03.904	11	4
12	28	(Spain) Izan Guevara	Blu Cru Pramac Yamaha Moto2	Boscoscuro	Qualified in Q2	2:03.930	12	4
13	95	(Netherlands) Collin Veijer	Red Bull KTM Ajo	Kalex	Qualified in Q2	2:03.980	13	5
14	9	(Spain) Jorge Navarro	Klint Forward Factory Team	Forward	2:03.899	2:04.035	14	5
15	12	(Czech Republic) Filip Salač	Elf Marc VDS Racing Team	Boscoscuro	Qualified in Q2	2:04.079	15	5
16	10	(Brazil) Diogo Moreira	Italtrans Racing Team	Kalex	Qualified in Q2	2:04.174	16	6
17	99	(Spain) Adrián Huertas	Italtrans Racing Team	Kalex	2:03.969	2:04.300	17	6
18	4	(Spain) Iván Ortolá	QJMotor – Frinsa – MSi	Boscoscuro	2:03.929	2:04.601	18	6
19	71	(Japan) Ayumu Sasaki	RW-Idrofoglia Racing GP	Kalex	2:04.000	N/A	19	7
20	21	(Spain) Alonso López	Sync SpeedRS Team	Boscoscuro	2:04.027	N/A	20	7
21	13	(Italy) Celestino Vietti	Sync SpeedRS Team	Boscoscuro	2:04.050	N/A	21	7
22	84	(Netherlands) Zonta van den Goorbergh	RW-Idrofoglia Racing GP	Kalex	2:04.211	N/A	22	8
23	81	(Australia) Senna Agius	Liqui Moly Dynavolt Intact GP	Kalex	2:04.245	N/A	23	8
24	24	(Spain) Marcos Ramírez	OnlyFans American Racing Team	Kalex	2:04.409	N/A	24	8
25	64	(Indonesia) Mario Aji	Idemitsu Honda Team Asia	Kalex	2:04.568	N/A	25	9
26	15	(South Africa) Darryn Binder	Italjet Gresini Moto2	Kalex	2:04.950	N/A	26	9
27	92	(Japan) Yuki Kunii	Idemitsu Honda Team Asia	Kalex	2:05.626	N/A	27	9
28	29	(Australia) Harrison Voight	QJMotor – Frinsa – MSi	Boscoscuro	2:06.548	N/A	28	10
29	20	(Malaysia) Azroy Anuar	Petronas MIE Racing RW	Kalex	2:07.187	N/A	29	10
30	55	(Malaysia) Helmi Azman	Petronas MIE Racing RW	Kalex	2:08.330	N/A	30	10
OFFICIAL MOTO2 QUALIFYING TIMES REPORT

=== Moto3 ===
Fastest session lap

Pos.	No.	Biker	Team	Constructor	Qualifying times		Final grid	Row
Pos.	No.	Biker	Team	Constructor	Q1	Q2	Final grid	Row
1	22	(Spain) David Almansa	Leopard Racing	Honda	Qualified in Q2	2:09.846	1	1
2	72	(Japan) Taiyo Furusato	Honda Team Asia	Honda	Qualified in Q2	2:09.940	2	1
3	99	(Spain) José Antonio Rueda	Red Bull KTM Ajo	KTM	Qualified in Q2	2:10.076	3	1
4	94	(Italy) Guido Pini	Liqui Moly Dynavolt Intact GP	KTM	2:11.513	2:10.154	4	2
5	51	(Spain) Brian Uriarte	Liqui Moly Dynavolt Intact GP	KTM	Qualified in Q2	2:10.239	5	2
6	83	(Spain) Álvaro Carpe	Red Bull KTM Ajo	KTM	Qualified in Q2	2:10.296	6	2
7	73	(Argentina) Valentín Perrone	Red Bull KTM Tech3	KTM	2:11.703	2:10.297	7	3
8	28	(Spain) Máximo Quiles	CFMoto Power Electronics Aspar Team	KTM	Qualified in Q2	2:10.351	8	3
9	36	(Spain) Ángel Piqueras	Frinsa – MT Helmets – MSI	KTM	Qualified in Q2	2:10.427	9	3
10	58	(Italy) Luca Lunetta	Sic58 Squadra Corse	Honda	Qualified in Q2	2:10.681	10	4
11	66	(Australia) Joel Kelso	LEVELUP-MTA	KTM	Qualified in Q2	2:10.691	11	4
12	31	(Spain) Adrián Fernández	Leopard Racing	Honda	Qualified in Q2	2:10.717	12	4
13	6	(Japan) Ryusei Yamanaka	Frinsa – MT Helmets – MSI	KTM	2:11.261	2:11.097	13	5
14	13	(Malaysia) Hakim Danish	AEON Credit SIC Racing MSi	KTM	Qualified in Q2	2:11.487	14	5
15	19	(United Kingdom) Scott Ogden	CIP Green Power	KTM	Qualified in Q2	2:11.539	15	5
16	8	(United Kingdom) Eddie O'Shea	GRYD - Mlav Racing	Honda	Qualified in Q2	2:11.590	16	6
17	21	(South Africa) Ruché Moodley	Denssi Racing – BOE	KTM	2:11.713	2:11.800	17	6
18	18	(Italy) Matteo Bertelle	LEVELUP-MTA	KTM	Qualified in Q2	2:13.656	18	6
19	10	(Italy) Nicola Carraro	Rivacold Snipers Team	Honda	2:11.901	N/A	19	7
20	95	(Argentina) Marco Morelli	GRYD - Mlav Racing	Honda	2:11.920	N/A	20	7
21	78	(Spain) Joel Esteban	CFMoto Power Electronics Aspar Team	KTM	2:12.027	N/A	21	7
22	54	(Italy) Riccardo Rossi	Rivacold Snipers Team	Honda	2:12.099	N/A	22	8
23	82	(Italy) Stefano Nepa	Sic58 Squadra Corse	Honda	2:12.365	N/A	23	8
24	5	(Thailand) Tatchakorn Buasri	Honda Team Asia	Honda	2:12.586	N/A	24	8
25	55	(Switzerland) Noah Dettwiler	CIP Green Power	KTM	2:18.742	N/A	25	9
26	14	(New Zealand) Cormac Buchanan	Denssi Racing – BOE	KTM	No time set	N/A	26	9
OFFICIAL MOTO3 QUALIFYING TIMES REPORT

== MotoGP Sprint ==
The MotoGP Sprint was held on 25 October 2025.

Pos.	No.	Rider	Team	Manufacturer	Laps	Time/Retired	Grid	Points
1	63	(Italy) Francesco Bagnaia	Ducati Lenovo Team	Ducati	10	19:53.725	1	12
2	73	(Spain) Álex Márquez	BK8 Gresini Racing MotoGP	Ducati	10	+2.259	2	9
3	37	(Spain) Pedro Acosta	Red Bull KTM Factory Racing	KTM	10	+5.155	5	7
4	21	(Italy) Franco Morbidelli	Pertamina Enduro VR46 Racing Team	Ducati	10	+6.541	3	6
5	20	(France) Fabio Quartararo	Monster Energy Yamaha MotoGP Team	Yamaha	10	+8.468	4	5
6	72	(Italy) Marco Bezzecchi	Aprilia Racing	Aprilia	10	+10.232	14	4
7	54	(Spain) Fermín Aldeguer	BK8 Gresini Racing MotoGP	Ducati	10	+11.138 (Note: 8-second penalty due to illegal tyre pressures)	6	3
8	5	(France) Johann Zarco	Castrol Honda LCR	Honda	10	+12.627	9	2
9	23	(Italy) Enea Bastianini	Red Bull KTM Tech3	KTM	10	+12.974	19	1
10	49	(Italy) Fabio Di Giannantonio	Pertamina Enduro VR46 Racing Team	Ducati	10	+14.515	8	
11	44	(Spain) Pol Espargaró	Red Bull KTM Tech3	KTM	10	+14.924	12	
12	79	(Japan) Ai Ogura	Trackhouse MotoGP Team	Aprilia	10	+15.394	17	
13	25	(Spain) Raúl Fernández	Trackhouse MotoGP Team	Aprilia	10	+15.461	15	
14	43	(Australia) Jack Miller	Prima Pramac Yamaha MotoGP	Yamaha	10	+17.601	11	
15	42	(Spain) Álex Rins	Monster Energy Yamaha MotoGP Team	Yamaha	10	+17.721	10	
16	33	(South Africa) Brad Binder	Red Bull KTM Factory Racing	KTM	10	+18.248	18	
17	35	(Thailand) Somkiat Chantra	IDEMITSU Honda LCR	Honda	10	+22.398	20	
18	32	(Italy) Lorenzo Savadori	Aprilia Racing	Aprilia	10	+22.478	21	
19	7	(Spain) Augusto Fernández	Yamaha Factory Racing	Yamaha	10	+25.412	23	
20	51	(Italy) Michele Pirro	Ducati Lenovo Team	Ducati	10	+26.074	22	
Ret	10	(Italy) Luca Marini	Honda HRC Castrol	Honda	7	Crashed out	13	
Ret	88	(Portugal) Miguel Oliveira	Prima Pramac Yamaha MotoGP	Yamaha	5	Crashed out	16	
Ret	36	(Spain) Joan Mir	Honda HRC Castrol	Honda	5	Crashed out	7	
Fastest sprint lap: (Italy) Francesco Bagnaia (Ducati) – 1:58.079 (lap 2)
OFFICIAL MOTOGP SPRINT REPORT

== Warm Up ==
Pos.	No.	Biker	Team	Constructor	
Pos.	No.	Biker	Team	Constructor	Time results
1	73	(Spain) Álex Márquez	BK8 Gresini Racing MotoGP	Ducati	1:58.979
2	54	(Spain) Fermín Aldeguer	BK8 Gresini Racing MotoGP	Ducati	1:59.076
3	63	(Italy) Francesco Bagnaia	Ducati Lenovo Team	Ducati	1:59.093
4	21	(Italy) Franco Morbidelli	Pertamina Enduro VR46 Racing Team	Ducati	1:59.311
5	23	(Italy) Enea Bastianini	Red Bull KTM Tech3	KTM	1:59.360
6	44	(Spain) Pol Espargaró	Red Bull KTM Tech3	KTM	1:59.460
7	25	(Spain) Raúl Fernández	Trackhouse MotoGP Team	Aprilia	1:59.501
8	10	(Italy) Luca Marini	Honda HRC Castrol	Honda	1:59.586
9	33	(South Africa) Brad Binder	Red Bull KTM Factory Racing	KTM	1:59.641
10	5	(France) Johann Zarco	CASTROL Honda LCR	Honda	1:59.646
11	79	(Japan) Ai Ogura	Trackhouse MotoGP Team	Aprilia	1:59.709
12	72	(Italy) Marco Bezzecchi	Aprilia Racing	Aprilia	1:59.741
13	20	(France) Fabio Quartararo	Monster Energy Yamaha MotoGP Team	Yamaha	1:59.784
14	37	(Spain) Pedro Acosta	Red Bull KTM Factory Racing	KTM	1:59.803
15	88	(Portugal) Miguel Oliveira	Prima Pramac Yamaha MotoGP	Yamaha	1:59.984
16	36	(Spain) Joan Mir	Honda HRC Castrol	Honda	1:59.997
17	49	(Italy) Fabio Di Giannantonio	Pertamina Enduro VR46 Racing Team	Ducati	2:00.440
18	43	(Australia) Jack Miller	Prima Pramac Yamaha MotoGP	Yamaha	2:00.495
19	42	(Spain) Álex Rins	Monster Energy Yamaha MotoGP Team	Yamaha	2:00.748
20	51	(Italy) Michele Pirro	Ducati Lenovo Team	Ducati	2:00.850
21	35	(Thailand) Somkiat Chantra	Idemitsu Honda LCR	Honda	2:00.995
22	7	(Spain) Augusto Fernández	Yamaha Factory Racing	Yamaha	2:02.041
23	32	(Italy) Lorenzo Savadori	Aprilia Racing	Aprilia	2:02.364
OFFICIAL MOTOGP WARM UP TIMES REPORT

== Race ==
=== MotoGP ===
Pos.	No.	Rider	Team	Manufacturer	Laps	Time/Retired	Grid	Points
1	73	(Spain) Álex Márquez	BK8 Gresini Racing MotoGP	Ducati	20	40:09.249	2	25
2	37	(Spain) Pedro Acosta	Red Bull KTM Factory Racing	KTM	20	+2.676	5	20
3	36	(Spain) Joan Mir	Honda HRC Castrol	Honda	20	+8.048	7	16
4	21	(Italy) Franco Morbidelli	Pertamina Enduro VR46 Racing Team	Ducati	20	+8.580	3	13
5	20	(France) Fabio Quartararo	Monster Energy Yamaha MotoGP Team	Yamaha	20	+11.556	4	11
6	49	(Italy) Fabio Di Giannantonio	Pertamina Enduro VR46 Racing Team	Ducati	20	+13.060	8	10
7	23	(Italy) Enea Bastianini	Red Bull KTM Tech3	KTM	20	+15.299	19	9
8	10	(Italy) Luca Marini	Honda HRC Castrol	Honda	20	+18.738	13	8
9	33	(South Africa) Brad Binder	Red Bull KTM Factory Racing	KTM	20	+18.932	18	7
10	79	(Japan) Ai Ogura	Trackhouse MotoGP Team	Aprilia	20	+19.256	17	6
11	72	(Italy) Marco Bezzecchi	Aprilia Racing	Aprilia	20	+19.824	14	5
12	5	(France) Johann Zarco	Castrol Honda LCR	Honda	20	+22.234	9	4
13	42	(Spain) Álex Rins	Monster Energy Yamaha MotoGP Team	Yamaha	20	+23.509	10	3
14	43	(Australia) Jack Miller	Prima Pramac Yamaha MotoGP	Yamaha	20	+25.201	11	2
15	35	(Thailand) Somkiat Chantra	IDEMITSU Honda LCR	Honda	20	+34.110	20	1
16	32	(Italy) Lorenzo Savadori	Aprilia Racing	Aprilia	20	+36.115	21	
17	51	(Italy) Michele Pirro	Ducati Lenovo Team	Ducati	20	+43.914	22	
18	7	(Spain) Augusto Fernández	Yamaha Factory Racing	Yamaha	20	+47.060	23	
19	88	(Portugal) Miguel Oliveira	Prima Pramac Yamaha MotoGP	Yamaha	20	+1:17.942	16	
Ret	63	(Italy) Francesco Bagnaia	Ducati Lenovo Team	Ducati	18	Puncture	1	
Ret	54	(Spain) Fermín Aldeguer	BK8 Gresini Racing MotoGP	Ducati	16	Accident	6	
Ret	25	(Spain) Raúl Fernández	Trackhouse MotoGP Team	Aprilia	11	Accident	15	
Ret	44	(Spain) Pol Espargaró	Red Bull KTM Tech3	KTM	4	Accident	12	
Fastest lap: (Spain) Álex Márquez (Ducati) – 1:58.873 (lap 2)
OFFICIAL MOTOGP RACE REPORT

== Championship standings after the race ==
Below are the standings for the top five riders, constructors, and teams after the round.

=== MotoGP ===
Riders' Championship standings

Pos.	Rider	Points
1	(Spain) Marc Márquez	545
2	(Spain) Álex Márquez	413
3	(Italy) Marco Bezzecchi	291
4	(Italy) Francesco Bagnaia	286
5	(Spain) Pedro Acosta	260

Constructors' Championship standings

Pos.	Constructor	Points
1	(Italy) Ducati	708
2	(Italy) Aprilia	355
3	(Austria) KTM	325
4	(Japan) Honda	266
5	(Japan) Yamaha	221

Teams' Championship standings

Pos.	Team	Points
1	(Italy) Ducati Lenovo Team	831
2	(Italy) BK8 Gresini Racing MotoGP	599
3	(Italy) Pertamina Enduro VR46 Racing Team	453
4	(Austria) Red Bull KTM Factory Racing	393
5	(Italy) Aprilia Racing	333

=== Moto2 ===
Riders' Championship standings

	Pos.	Rider	Points
1	1	(Brazil) Diogo Moreira	256
1	2	(Spain) Manuel González	247
1	3	(Belgium) Barry Baltus	221
1	4	(United Kingdom) Jake Dixon	215
2	5	(Spain) Arón Canet	213

Constructors' Championship standings

Pos.	Constructor	Points
1	(Germany) Kalex	473
2	(Italy) Boscoscuro	311
3	(Switzerland) Forward	21

Teams' Championship standings

	Pos.	Team	Points
	1	(Italy) Fantic Racing	434
	2	(Germany) Liqui Moly Dynavolt Intact GP	380
	3	(Spain) CFMoto RCB Aspar Team	316
1	4	(Belgium) Elf Marc VDS Racing Team	297
1	5	(Italy) Italtrans Racing Team	283

=== Moto3 ===
Riders' Championship standings

Pos.	Rider	Points
1	(Spain) José Antonio Rueda	365
2	(Spain) Ángel Piqueras	251
3	(Spain) Máximo Quiles	238
4	(Spain) David Muñoz	197
5	(Australia) Joel Kelso	184

Constructors' Championship standings

Pos.	Constructor	Points
1	(Austria) KTM	495
2	(Japan) Honda	267

Teams' Championship standings

	Pos.	Team	Points
	1	(Finland) Red Bull KTM Ajo	549
	2	(Spain) Frinsa – MT Helmets – MSi	387
	3	(Spain) CFMoto Power Electronics Aspar Team	345
	4	(Germany) Liqui Moly Dynavolt Intact GP	303
1	5	(Luxembourg) Leopard Racing	273

== Notes ==
Previous race: 2025 Australian Grand Prix	FIM Grand Prix World Championship; 2025 season	Next race: 2025 Portuguese Grand Prix
Previous race: 2024 Malaysian Grand Prix	Malaysian motorcycle Grand Prix	Next race: 2026 Malaysian Grand Prix
