= Honda HRC Castrol =

Factory motorcycle racing team

- 2026 name: Honda HRC Castrol
- Base: Asaka, Saitama
- Principal: Alberto Puig
- Rider(s): 10. Luca Marini; 36. Joan Mir; 41. Aleix Espargaro; (Test Rider); 30. Takaaki Nakagami (Test Rider); 6. Stefan Bradl (Test Rider); 56. Jonathan Rea (Test Rider)
- Motorcycle: Honda NSR500; Honda NSR500V; Honda RC211V; Honda RC212V; Honda RC213V
- Tyres: Michelin
- Riders' Championships: 19; 1983, 1985 - Freddie Spencer; 1987 - Wayne Gardner; 1994, 1995, 1996, 1997, 1998 - Mick Doohan; 1999 - Àlex Crivillé; 2002, 2003 - Valentino Rossi; 2006 - Nicky Hayden; 2011 - Casey Stoner; 2013, 2014, 2016, 2017, 2018, 2019 - Marc Márquez
- Teams' Championships: 10; 2002, 2003, 2006, 2011, 2012, 2013, 2014, 2017, 2018, 2019

Honda HRC Castrol is the official factory team of the Honda Racing Corporation in the MotoGP class of Grand Prix motorcycle racing (World Championship road racing), formerly backed by principal sponsor Repsol for 30 years until the end of 2024.

== History ==
=== 1990s: Doohan dominance, Crivillé championship ===
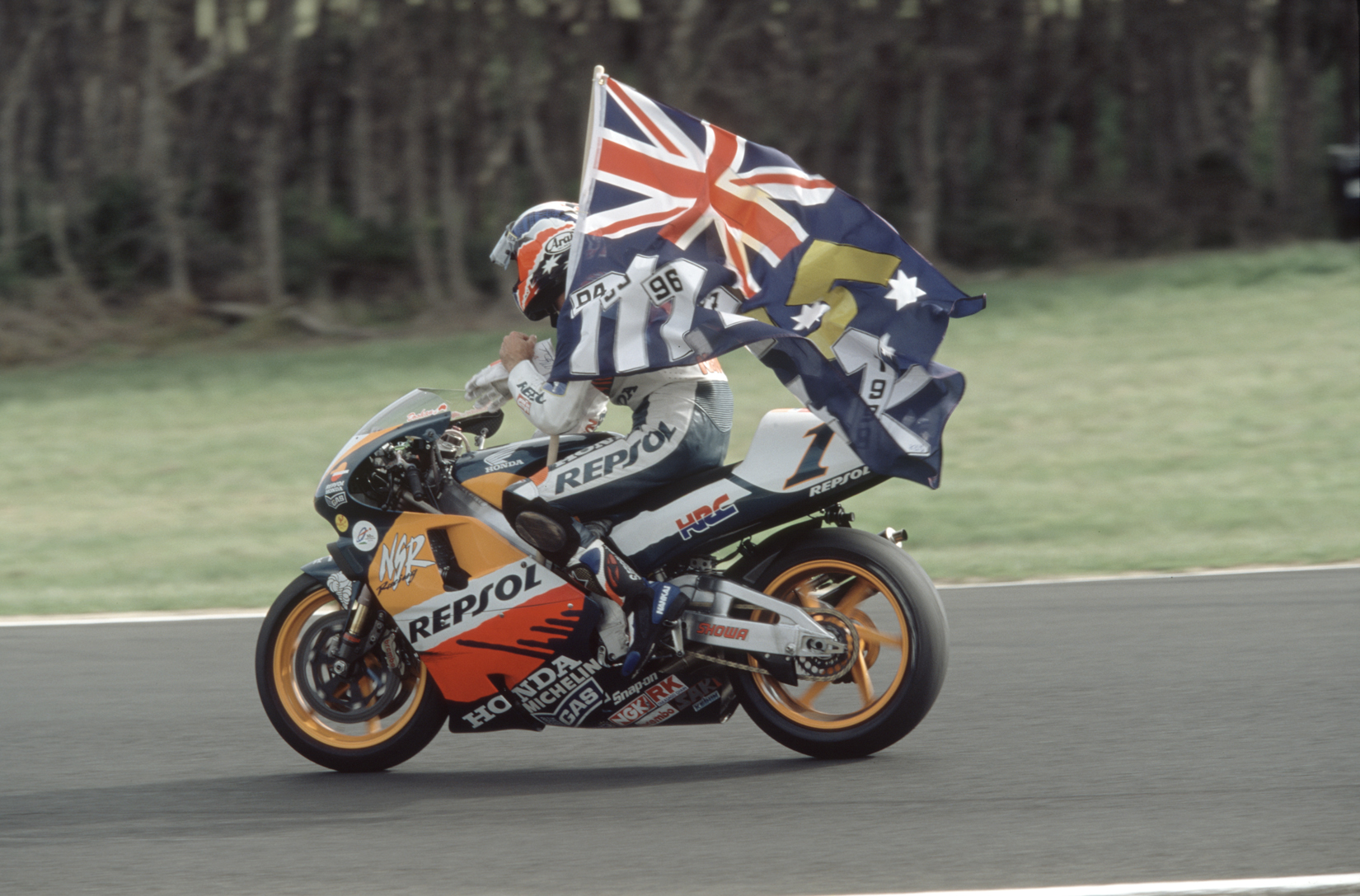
Mick Doohan won five-in-a-row world titles with the team, from 1994 to 1998.

Honda first entered the premier 500cc (now MotoGP) class in 1966. Prior to the modern era, works efforts ran under various sponsorships, including the Rothmans Honda team in the late 1980s and early 1990s. In 1995, Honda restructured its factory premier class programme into a single entity in partnership with Spanish oil company Repsol.

In 1995 the newly branded Repsol Honda team entered a three-rider lineup with Mick Doohan, Àlex Crivillé and Shinichi Ito all riding the Honda NSR500. Doohan won seven races and secured a second consecutive World Championship in Argentina. Crivillé finished the season ranked fourth in the standings, with one race win, while Ito finished fifth. The team expanded its lineup to four riders in 1996. Doohan and Crivillé rode the NSR500 while Ito and Tadayuki Okada rode the Honda NSR500V. Doohan won his third World Championship with eight race wins, and Crivillé finished runner-up with two wins. Okada finished seventh, and Ito twelfth.

The four rider line-up continued in 1997, with Doohan, Crivillé and Okada on the NSR500 and Takuma Aoki on the NSR500V. Repsol Honda won all fifteen of the season's races. Doohan alone won twelve of them, breaking Giacomo Agostini's record for victories in one season, on his way to his fourth World Championship. Okada finished runner-up, with one race win. Crivillé, who had to miss five races after a serious crash at Assen, finished fourth with two race wins. Aoki finished fifth. Repsol Honda riders took all of the podium positions at four events, in Japan, Spain, Germany and Indonesia.

In 1998, Doohan, Crivillé and Okada continued to ride the NSR500 and Sete Gibernau joined them on the NSR500V. Doohan continued to dominate the championship: he won eight races and was crowned World Champion for the fifth time in front of his home fans in Australia. Crivillé finished third, with two wins. Okada had to miss three races after breaking his wrist during practice of the Italian Grand Prix and finished eighth. Gibernau finished eleventh.

Doohan, Crivillé, Okada and Gibernau all returned in 1999. During qualifying for the Spanish Grand Prix, Doohan had a serious crash which would ultimately cause his retirement from the sport. Crivillé won six races, and clinched his first World Championship in Rio de Janeiro. Okada finished third, with three race wins. Gibernau – who started the season on the NSR500V before replacing Doohan on the NSR500 – finished fifth. The team managed an all-Repsol Honda riders' podium at Catalunya with Crivillé first, Okada second and Gibernau third.

=== 2000s: Rossi, Hayden championships ===
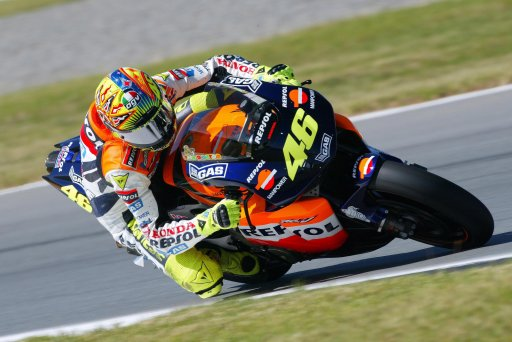
Valentino Rossi won two world titles with the team, in 2002 and 2003.

Crivillé, Okada and Gibernau remained with the team for the 2000 season, all riding NSR500 motorcycles. This was a difficult year for Repsol Honda: Crivillé won one race and finished ninth overall, Okada finished eleventh and Gibernau fifteenth. In 2001, Crivillé was joined by Tohru Ukawa in a two-rider lineup. This season was not much better than the previous one, as Crivillé could only manage two podiums and finished the season eighth, while Ukawa finished tenth with a single podium finish.

In 2002, the debut year of the new MotoGP class, Valentino Rossi joined the team alongside Ukawa riding the new Honda RC211V. They were the only two riders to use the new motorcycle until near the end of the season, when Alex Barros and Daijiro Kato were also given the RC211V. Rossi dominated the season with eleven race wins, and became World Champion with four rounds remaining. Ukawa took one victory and eight podiums to finish third overall. 2002 AMA Superbike Champion Nicky Hayden joined Rossi in 2003. Hayden finished the season in fifth, with two podium finishes. Rossi took nine wins and finished on the podium in every race to secure another championship. He then left Honda for Yamaha.

Alex Barros joined Hayden at Repsol Honda in 2004. Barros finished the season fourth with four podiums, and Hayden eighth with two podiums. Neither rider secured a race victory. In 2005, Max Biaggi replaced Barros opposite Hayden. Hayden claimed his first MotoGP victory at his home race, the United States Grand Prix. He finished the season third overall. Biaggi finished in fifth place, with four podiums.

In 2006, Hayden was joined by 250cc World Champion Dani Pedrosa. Hayden led the championship race for most of the season, but at the Portuguese Grand Prix, Pedrosa recklessly crashed into him. Both riders recorded a DNF, and Rossi took the championship lead for Yamaha with one race remaining. At the final round in Valencia, Rossi fell off his bike on lap 5 trying to make up for a poor start. Hayden rode a conservative race to finish in third, and thus became World Champion. He had scored two race wins and eight other podium finishes across the season. Pedrosa finished fifth, with two race wins and six other podium finishes.

Hayden and Pedrosa were retained for 2007, riding the new 800cc Honda RC212V. The bike did not perform well at first, but improved throughout the season. Pedrosa got two race wins and became championship runner-up, while Hayden could only manage three podium finishes and finished the season in eighth. Both riders remained at Repsol Honda in 2008, with Mike Leitner and Pete Benson as Pedrosa and Hayden's chief mechanics, respectively, and Kazuhiko Yamano as team manager. During the season Pedrosa switched to Bridgestone tyres and a wall was placed between the two riders' garages to prevent observation of tyre data. This idea was borrowed from Rossi, who had instituted a wall at the beginning of the same season between himself and his teammate Jorge Lorenzo.

In 2009, Pedrosa was partnered by Andrea Dovizioso. They finished in third and sixth respectively.

=== 2010s: Stoner championship, Márquez dominance ===
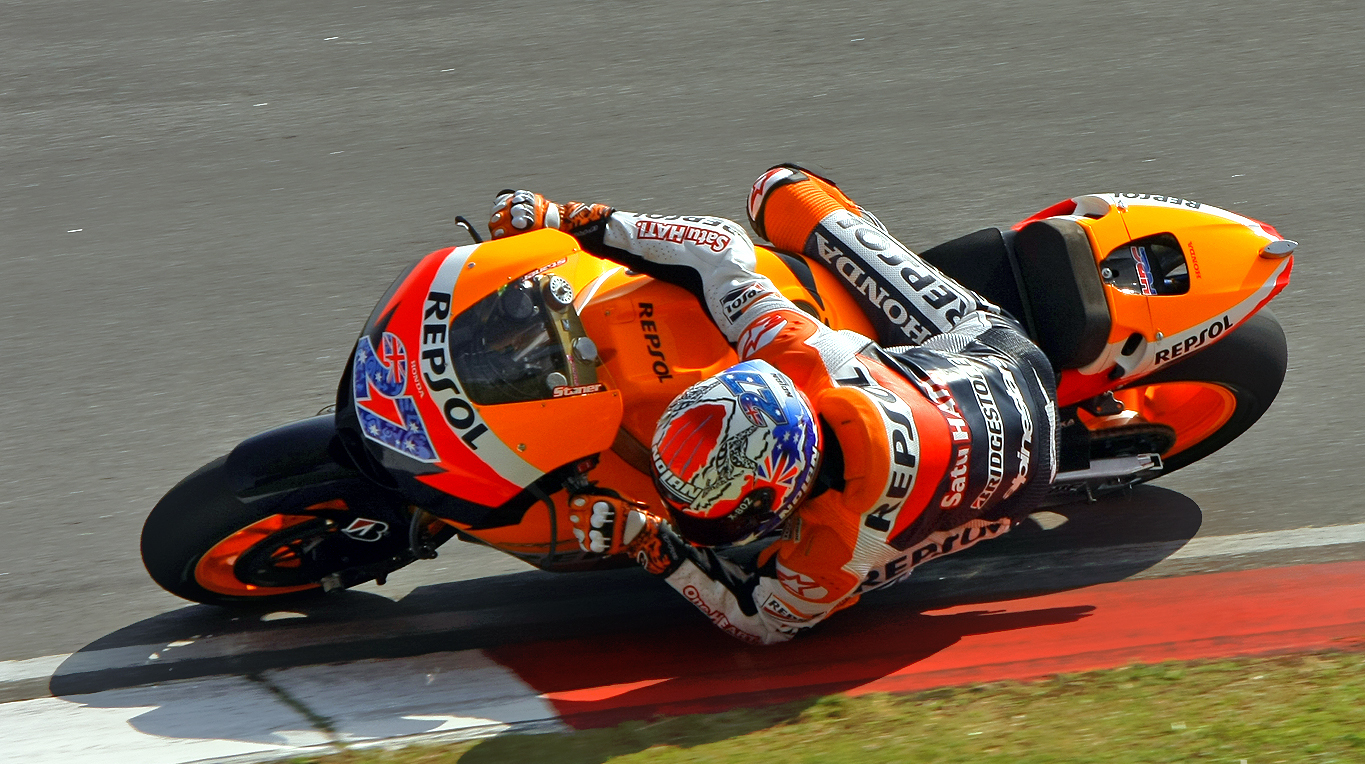
Casey Stoner racing for Repsol Honda at the 2011 Malaysian Grand Prix.

Pedrosa and Dovizioso were retained for the 2010 season. Pedrosa clinched another runner-up finish in the championship, after winning four races. Dovizioso finished in fifth. Honda were eyeing Casey Stoner to join the factory team, but Dovizioso's contract contained a performance clause that meant a fifth-place championship finish in 2010 would secure his seat for the next year. Repsol Honda therefore ran a rare three-rider lineup in 2011. Stoner won nine races to secure the championship. Dovizioso finished third, and Pedrosa finished fourth, having missed three rounds due to injury.

Pedrosa and Stoner were retained for 2012, riding the Honda RC213V. Pedrosa finished runner-up, despite winning more races than eventual champion Jorge Lorenzo. Stoner missed three races after an injury sustained during qualifying in Indianapolis, and finished third. On May 17, 2012, Stoner shockingly announced his retirement from the sport aged just twenty-seven.

On 12 July 2012, it was announced that Moto2 rider Marc Márquez had signed a two-year contract to replace Stoner as Pedrosa's teammate from 2013 onwards. Márquez finished ahead of Pedrosa to claim a podium on his MotoGP debut in Qatar. Márquez won the next race in Texas to become the youngest premier class race winner of all time. He won five more races throughout the season and clinched the championship at the last round in Valencia, becoming the youngest premier class champion of all time. He was aided by midseason injuries for Lorenzo and Pedrosa, who finished in third overall. Honda secured the Teams' and Constructors' championships.

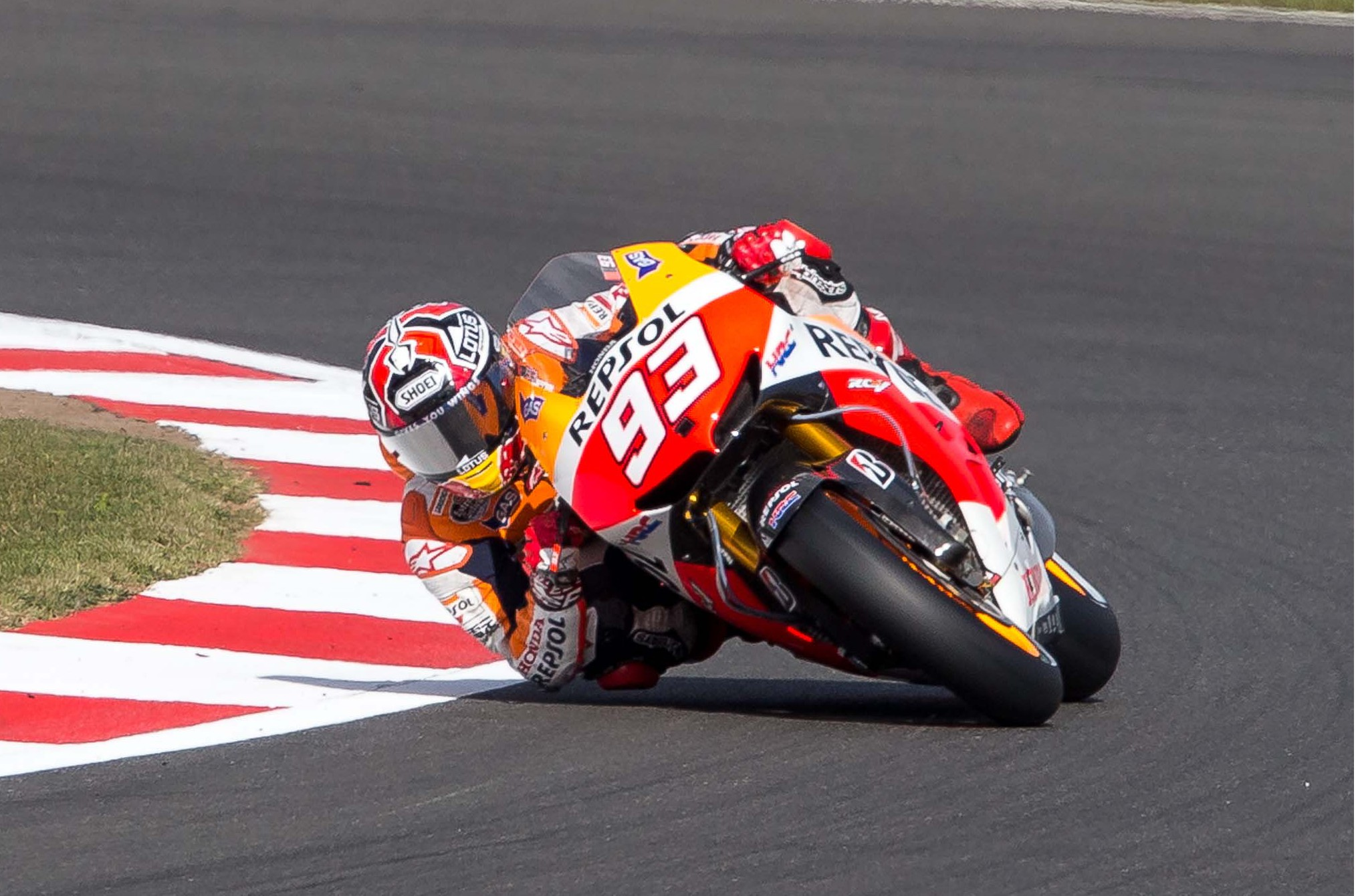
Marc Márquez in 2013, the year he claimed his first of six MotoGP titles for Repsol Honda.

Márquez and Pedrosa were retained for 2014. Márquez won the first ten races of the season and thirteen overall, breaking Doohan's record for wins across a single season. He won the championship, while Pedrosa finished fourth. Honda once again secured the Teams' and Constructors' championships. Honda's bike was more fractious in 2015: Márquez recorded five race wins but six DNFs, and Pedrosa missed three races due to injury. They finished third and fourth in the standings. During this season, Red Bull became a main sponsor for the team.

Márquez and Pedrosa were retained for 2016. The season initially looked daunting for Repsol Honda, who were concerned about the RC213V's compatibility with MotoGP's new tyre sponsor Michelin. After a frantic preseason, these issues were resolved. Márquez won five races and rode comfortably to his third MotoGP championship. Pedrosa finished sixth, with one race win. The pair were retained for 2017, where Márquez retained the championship and Pedrosa finished fourth, and 2018, where Márquez retained the championship and Pedrosa finished eleventh.

Pedrosa retired at the end of 2018, and was replaced by five-time world champion Jorge Lorenzo for the 2019 season. Lorenzo's 2019 was disastrous: his best race finish was eleventh, and he finished the season ranked nineteenth in the standings. Márquez meanwhile won his sixth MotoGP title for Honda to solidify his place as their most successful rider in history. He did so in dominant style, winning twelve races, and failing to finish within the top two on only one occasion, when he recorded a DNF in Texas. Off the back of his performance, Honda retained the Teams' and Constructors' championships. Lorenzo retired, and Márquez signed a new four-year contract with Honda, breaking the usual two-year contract cycle.

=== 2020s: RC213V problems, Márquez departure ===
Marc Márquez's younger brother Álex joined him at Repsol Honda for the 2020 season. The season calendar was delayed and shortened due to the onset of the COVID-19 pandemic. At the first race in Jerez, Marc suffered a vicious highside, ending his race and breaking his right humerus. Due to a string of surgeries and medical complications, he did not participate in another race in the 2020 season. He was replaced by test rider Stefan Bradl for the remainder of the season. Álex scored two podiums and finished the season in fourteenth place in the standings, and Bradl in nineteenth. This was Honda's least successful year in MotoGP for decades.

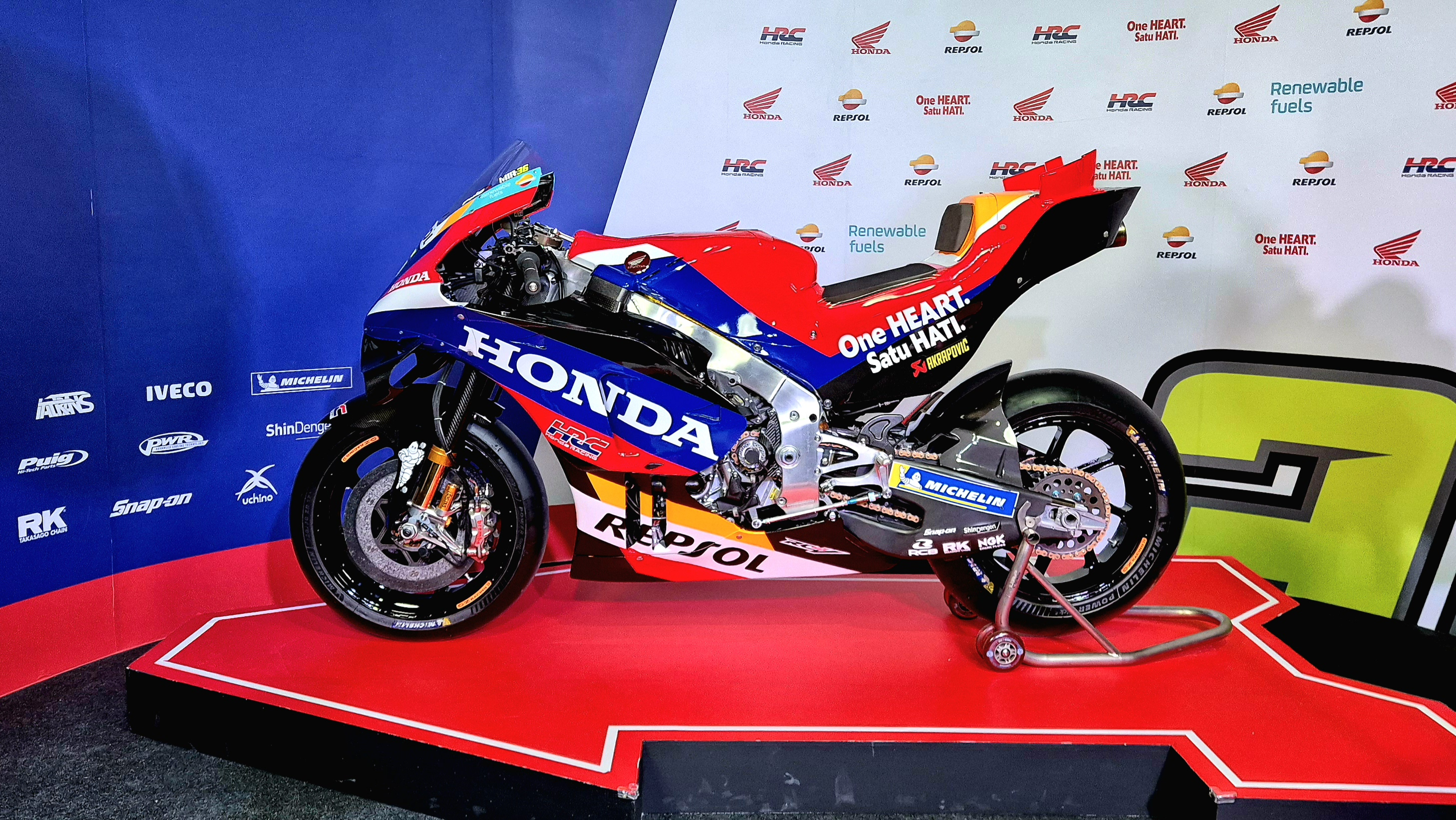
Repsol Honda's 2024 livery with noticeable reduced Repsol advertising.

Marc Márquez returned to Repsol Honda in 2021, with his brother replaced by Pol Espargaró. Márquez won three races, at Germany, Texas, and the Emilia Romagna GP, but recorded four DNFs and missed four more races due to injury to finish the season ranked seventh. Espargaró finished twelfth, scoring a single podium finish. In 2022, Márquez left the grid midseason for yet another arm surgery. In spite of not starting 8 of 20 races, he finished the season in thirteenth place with 113 points, more than double that of any of his Honda stablemates. The RC213V was now alarmingly uncompetitive.

Honda's fortunes worsened in 2023, when Espargaró was replaced by 2020 champion Joan Mir. Márquez failed to finish a single race across the first nine rounds of the season due to a series of crashes on the hugely uncooperative bike. At Mugello, Márquez, Mir and satellite rider Álex Rins were all sidelined by crashes. At the Sachsenring, historically a strong track for Honda, Márquez crashed five times across the practice, qualifying and warm-up rounds and withdrew from the main race. Márquez, Mir and Rins all missed multiple races throughout the season due to injury. Márquez scored the factory team's lone podium of the season at Motegi and ultimately finished in fourteenth, Honda's best result in the standings. On October 4, 2023, Márquez announced he had terminated his contract with Honda early by mutual agreement.

Márquez was replaced by Luca Marini for the 2024 season. Mir and Marini finished the season in twenty-first and twenty-second position in the standings respectively, with their best race result an eleventh-place finish for Mir at the Emilia Romagna GP. The team finished the season in eleventh and last place overall, and Honda finished bottom of the constructors' table. On September 8, 2024, Honda and title sponsor Repsol announced that they would part ways at the end of the year. Their relationship had been strained by Honda's run of results – their worst since the 1980s – as well as the departure of Márquez. The legendary Repsol orange had already been noticeably reduced from the fairings of Honda's bikes for the 2024 season.

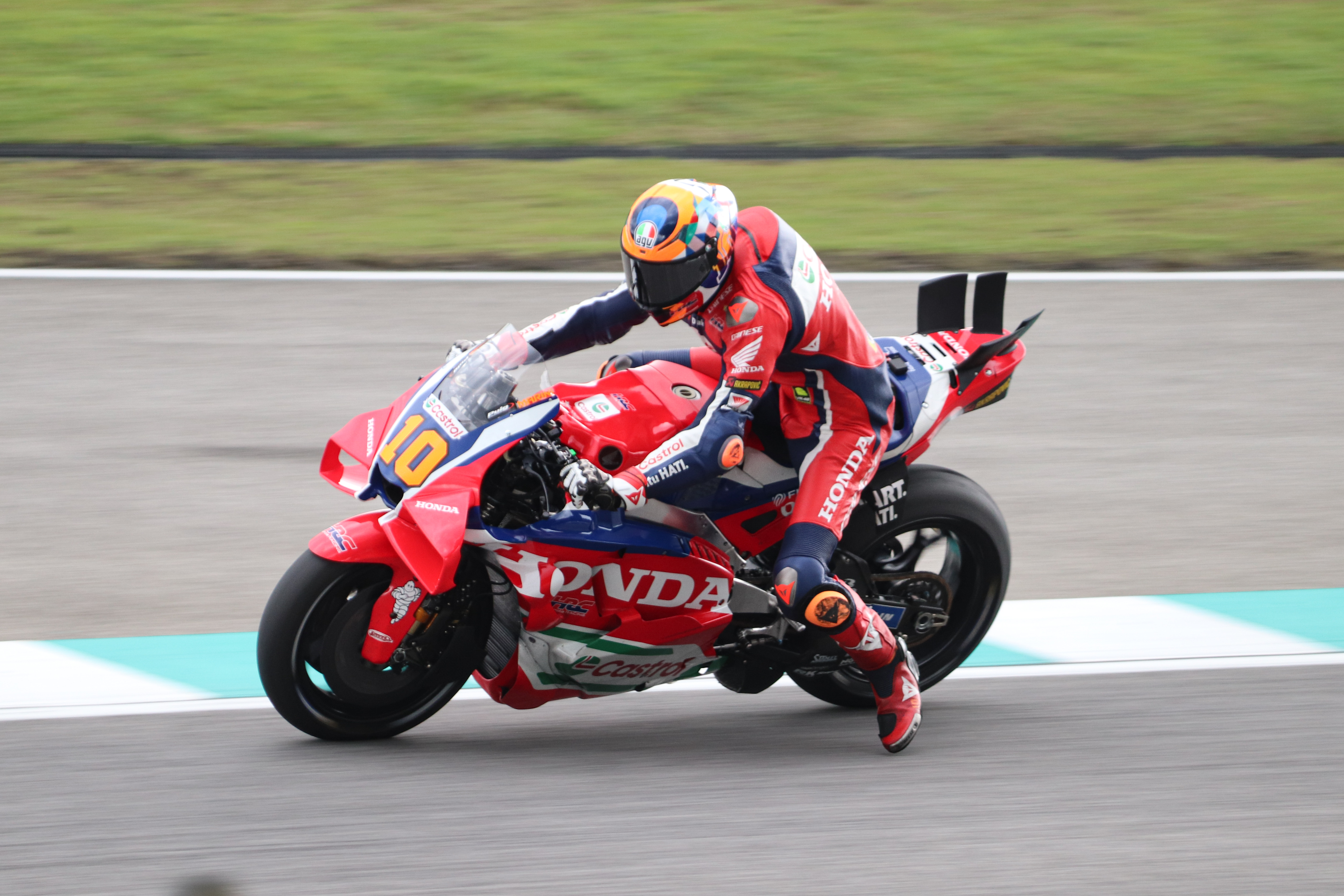
Luca Marini racing for Honda HRC Castrol at the 2025 Malaysian Grand Prix.

Mir and Marini were retained for the 2025 season. Castrol – already a title sponsor for Honda's satellite Grand Prix team LCR Honda – was announced as the team's replacement title sponsor. This season was more encouraging for Honda. Marini rode with consistency to finish thirteenth in the standings, equalling the team's best riders' result since 2021. Mir took more risks and finished in fifteenth, recording thirteen main race DNFs. However, he also took two podiums: at Honda's home race in Japan and in Malaysia. Mir and Marini will continue to ride for Honda HRC Castrol in 2026.

== Grand Prix motorcycle results ==
(key) (Races in bold indicate pole position; races in italics indicate fastest lap)

Year	Bike	No.	Riders	Race																Rider's standings		Manufacturers standings	
Year	Bike	No.	Riders	1	2	3	4	5	6	7	8	9	10	11	12	13	14	15	16	Pts	Pos	Pts	Pos
1995	Honda NSR500			MAL	AUS	JPN	ESP	GER	ITA	NED	FRA	GBR	CZE	RIO	ARG	EUR							
1995	Honda NSR500	1	(Australia) Mick Doohan	**1**	**1**	**2**	**Ret**	**Ret**	**1**	1	**1**	**1**	2	**2**	1	4				248	1st	301	1st
1995	Honda NSR500	6	(Spain) Àlex Crivillé	3	3	Ret	3	4	5	**2**	Ret	3	6	6	4	1				166	4th	301	1st
1995	Honda NSR500	7	(Japan) Shinichi Ito	10	7	Ret	8	3	4	8	4	6	5	10	9	2				127	5th	301	1st
1996	Honda NSR500			MAL	INA	JPN	ESP	ITA	FRA	NED	GER	GBR	AUT	CZE	IMO	CAT	RIO	AUS					
1996	Honda NSR500	1	(Australia) Mick Doohan	5	**1**	6	**1**	**1**	1	1	2	**1**	**2**	2	**1**	**2**	**1**	8		309	1st	365	1st
1996	Honda NSR500	4	(Spain) Àlex Crivillé	Ret	4	**2**	Ret	2	**2**	**2**	**3**	2	1	1	2	3	2	**6**		245	2nd	365	1st
1996	Honda NSR500V	6	(Japan) Tadayuki Okada	**Ret**	Ret	4	3	7	Ret	13	7	4	11	7	3	5	8	2		132	7th	365	1st
1996	Honda NSR500V	41	(Japan) Shinichi Ito	Ret	13	11	9	8	Ret	10	9	10	Ret	10	9	6	11	9		77	12th	365	1st
1997	Honda NSR500			MAL	JPN	ESP	ITA	AUT	FRA	NED	IMO	GER	RIO	GBR	CZE	CAT	INA	AUS					
1997	Honda NSR500	1	(Australia) Mick Doohan	1	1	2	**1**	**1**	**1**	**1**	**1**	**1**	**1**	**1**	**1**	**1**	**2**	**Ret**		340	1st	375	1st
1997	Honda NSR500	2	(Spain) Àlex Crivillé	2	2	1	4	5	4	DNS					4	3	3	1		172	4th	375	1st
1997	Honda NSR500	7	(Japan) Tadayuki Okada	**10**	**3**	**3**	Ret	2	3	12	5	2	2	2	Ret	6	1	4		197	2nd	375	1st
1997	Honda NSR500V	24	(Japan) Takuma Aoki	5	4	4	Ret	Ret	5	Ret	3	3	DNS	10	6	7	7	2		134	5th	375	1st
1998	Honda NSR500			JPN	MAL	ESP	ITA	FRA	MAD	NED	GBR	GER	CZE	IMO	CAT	AUS	ARG						
1998	Honda NSR500	1	(Australia) Mick Doohan	Ret	**1**	2	**1**	**2**	**Ret**	**1**	2	1	**Ret**	1	1	**1**	**1**			260	1st	345	1st
1998	Honda NSR500	2	(Japan) Tadayuki Okada	2	Ret	7	DNQ			8			4	7	2	9	2			106	8th	345	1st
1998	Honda NSR500	4	(Spain) Àlex Crivillé	4	4	1	3	1	5	6	4	3	2	2	**Ret**	3	Ret			198	3rd	345	1st
1998	Honda NSR500V	15	(Spain) Sete Gibernau	10	Ret	12	14	10	3	Ret	Ret	Ret	6	8	4	Ret	9			72	11th	345	1st
1999	Honda NSR500			MAL	JPN	ESP	FRA	ITA	CAT	NED	GBR	GER	CZE	IMO	VAL	AUS	RSA	RIO	AUS				
1999	Honda NSR500	1	(Australia) Mick Doohan	4	2	DNS														33	17th	338	1st
1999	Honda NSR500	3	(Spain) Àlex Crivillé	3	4	**1**	1	1	1	Ret	1	2	2	**1**	Ret	5	3	6	5	267	1st	338	1st
1999	Honda NSR500	8	(Japan) Tadayuki Okada	5	15	4	9	3	2	**1**	**2**	Ret	1	4	4	1	**4**	7	Ret	211	3rd	338	1st
1999	Honda NSR500	15	(Spain) Sete Gibernau						3	3	DNS	9	10	10	9	6	2	5	6	165	5th	338	1st
1999	Honda NSR500V	15	(Spain) Sete Gibernau	10	5	3	4	6												165	5th	338	1st
2000	Honda NSR500			RSA	MAL	JPN	ESP	FRA	ITA	CAT	NED	GBR	GER	CZE	POR	VAL	RIO	PAC	AUS				
2000	Honda NSR500	1	(Spain) Àlex Crivillé	5	Ret	6	4	1	Ret	Ret	2	7	Ret	7	6	Ret	11	6	Ret	122	9th	311	2nd
2000	Honda NSR500	5	(Spain) Sete Gibernau	**Ret**	7	Ret	Ret	15	10	Ret	7	11	10	6	Ret	8	7	12	Ret	72	15th	311	2nd
2000	Honda NSR500	8	(Japan) Tadayuki Okada	Ret	6	3	10	14	8	15	11	10	5	10	7	9	9	10	9	107	11th	311	2nd
2001	Honda NSR500			JPN	RSA	ESP	FRA	ITA	CAT	NED	GBR	GER	CZE	POR	VAL	PAC	AUS	MAL	RIO				
2001	Honda NSR500	11	(Japan) Tohru Ukawa	Ret	3	5	Ret	7	7	8	16	Ret	5	Ret	6	5	5	5	**Ret**	107	10th	367	1st
2001	Honda NSR500	28	(Spain) Àlex Crivillé	9	6	3	5	4	11	Ret	7	DNS	2	Ret	Ret	11	11	6	7	120	8th	367	1st

== MotoGP results ==
=== By rider ===
Year	Team name	Bike	Riders	Races	Wins	Podiums	Poles	F. laps	Points	Pos.
2002	Repsol Honda Team	Honda RC211V	(Japan) Tohru Ukawa	15	1	9	0	2	209	3rd
2002	Repsol Honda Team	Honda RC211V	(Italy) Valentino Rossi	16	11	15	7	9	355	1st
2003	Repsol Honda	Honda RC211V	(Italy) Valentino Rossi	16	9	16	9	12	357	1st
2003	Repsol Honda	Honda RC211V	(United States) Nicky Hayden	16	0	2	0	0	130	5th
2004	Repsol Honda Team	Honda RC211V	(Brazil) Alex Barros	16	0	4	0	2	165	4th
2004	Repsol Honda Team	Honda RC211V	(United States) Nicky Hayden	15	0	2	0	0	117	8th
2005	Repsol Honda Team	Honda RC211V	(Italy) Max Biaggi	17	0	4	0	1	173	5th
2005	Repsol Honda Team	Honda RC211V	(United States) Nicky Hayden	17	1	6	3	2	206	3rd
2006	Repsol Honda Team	Honda RC211V	(Spain) Dani Pedrosa	17	2	8	4	4	215	5th
2006	Repsol Honda Team	Honda RC211V	(United States) Nicky Hayden	17	2	10	1	2	252	1st
2007	Repsol Honda Team	Honda RC212V	(United States) Nicky Hayden	18	0	3	1	1	127	8th
2007	Repsol Honda Team	Honda RC212V	(Spain) Dani Pedrosa	18	2	8	5	3	242	2nd
2008	Repsol Honda Team	Honda RC212V	(Spain) Dani Pedrosa	17	2	11	2	2	249	3rd
2008	Repsol Honda Team	Honda RC212V	(United States) Nicky Hayden	16	0	2	0	1	155	6th
2009	Repsol Honda Team	Honda RC212V	(Spain) Dani Pedrosa	17	2	11	2	5	234	3rd
2009	Repsol Honda Team	Honda RC212V	(Italy) Andrea Dovizioso	17	1	1	0	0	160	6th
2010	Repsol Honda Team	Honda RC212V	(Italy) Andrea Dovizioso	18	0	7	1	1	206	5th
2010	Repsol Honda Team	Honda RC212V	(Spain) Dani Pedrosa	15	4	9	4	8	245	2nd
2011	Repsol Honda Team	Honda RC212V	(Italy) Andrea Dovizioso	17	0	7	0	1	228	3rd
2011	Repsol Honda Team	Honda RC212V	(Japan) Hiroshi Aoyama	1	0	0	0	0	8 (98)	10th
2011	Repsol Honda Team	Honda RC212V	(Spain) Dani Pedrosa	14	3	9	2	4	219	4th
2011	Repsol Honda Team	Honda RC212V	(Australia) Casey Stoner	17	10	16	12	7	350	1st
2012	Repsol Honda Team	Honda RC213V	(Australia) Casey Stoner	15	5	10	5	2	254	3rd
2012	Repsol Honda Team	Honda RC213V	(Spain) Dani Pedrosa	18	7	15	5	9	332	2nd
2012	Repsol Honda Team	Honda RC213V	(United Kingdom) Jonathan Rea	2	0	0	0	0	17	21st
2013	Repsol Honda Team	Honda RC213V	(Spain) Dani Pedrosa	17	3	13	2	4	300	3rd
2013	Repsol Honda Team	Honda RC213V	(Spain) Marc Márquez	18	6	16	9	11	334	1st
2014	Repsol Honda Team	Honda RC213V	(Spain) Dani Pedrosa	18	1	10	1	2	246	4th
2014	Repsol Honda Team	Honda RC213V	(Spain) Marc Márquez	18	13	14	13	12	362	1st
2015	Repsol Honda Team	Honda RC213V	(Japan) Hiroshi Aoyama	3	0	0	0	0	5	25th
2015	Repsol Honda Team	Honda RC213V	(Spain) Dani Pedrosa	15	2	6	1	0	206	4th
2015	Repsol Honda Team	Honda RC213V	(Spain) Marc Márquez	18	5	9	8	7	242	3rd
2016	Repsol Honda Team	Honda RC213V	(Japan) Hiroshi Aoyama	2	0	0	0	0	1	25th
2016	Repsol Honda Team	Honda RC213V	(Spain) Dani Pedrosa	15	1	3	0	1	155	6th
2016	Repsol Honda Team	Honda RC213V	(United States) Nicky Hayden	1	0	0	0	0	0 (1)	26th
2016	Repsol Honda Team	Honda RC213V	(Spain) Marc Márquez	18	5	12	7	4	298	1st
2017	Repsol Honda Team	Honda RC213V	(Spain) Dani Pedrosa	18	2	9	3	2	210	4th
2017	Repsol Honda Team	Honda RC213V	(Spain) Marc Márquez	18	6	12	8	3	298	1st
2018	Repsol Honda Team	Honda RC213V	(Spain) Dani Pedrosa	18	0	0	0	0	117	11th
2018	Repsol Honda Team	Honda RC213V	(Spain) Marc Márquez	18	9	14	7	7	321	1st
2019	Repsol Honda Team	Honda RC213V	(Germany) Stefan Bradl	3	0	0	0	0	10 (16)	21st
2019	Repsol Honda Team	Honda RC213V	(Spain) Marc Márquez	19	12	18	10	12	420	1st
2019	Repsol Honda Team	Honda RC213V	(Spain) Jorge Lorenzo	15	0	0	0	0	28	19th
2020	Repsol Honda Team	Honda RC213V	(Germany) Stefan Bradl	11	0	0	0	0	27	19th
2020	Repsol Honda Team	Honda RC213V	(Spain) Álex Márquez	14	0	2	0	0	74	14th
2020	Repsol Honda Team	Honda RC213V	(Spain) Marc Márquez	1	0	0	0	1	0	NC
2021	Repsol Honda Team	Honda RC213V	(Germany) Stefan Bradl	3	0	0	0	0	8 (14)	22nd
2021	Repsol Honda Team	Honda RC213V	(Spain) Pol Espargaró	17	0	1	1	0	100	12th
2021	Repsol Honda Team	Honda RC213V	(Spain) Marc Márquez	14	3	4	0	2	142	7th
2022	Repsol Honda Team	Honda RC213V	(Germany) Stefan Bradl	7	0	0	0	0	2	26th
2022	Repsol Honda Team	Honda RC213V	(Spain) Pol Espargaró	19	0	1	0	0	56	16th
2022	Repsol Honda Team	Honda RC213V	(Spain) Marc Márquez	12	0	1	1	0	113	13th
2023	Repsol Honda Team	Honda RC213V	(Germany) Stefan Bradl	1	0	0	0	0	0 (8)	26th
2023	Repsol Honda Team	Honda RC213V	(Spain) Joan Mir	15	0	0	0	0	26	22nd
2023	Repsol Honda Team	Honda RC213V	(Spain) Iker Lecuona	2	0	0	0	0	0	30th
2023	Repsol Honda Team	Honda RC213V	(Spain) Marc Márquez	15	0	1	1	0	96	14th
2024	Repsol Honda Team	Honda RC213V	(Italy) Luca Marini	19	0	0	0	0	14	22nd
2024	Repsol Honda Team	Honda RC213V	(Spain) Joan Mir	15	0	0	0	0	21	21st
2025	Honda HRC Castrol	Honda RC213V	(Italy) Luca Marini	19	0	0	0	0	142	13th
2025	Honda HRC Castrol	Honda RC213V	(Spain) Aleix Espargaró	1	0	0	0	0	0	28th
2025	Honda HRC Castrol	Honda RC213V	(Spain) Joan Mir	22	0	2	0	0	96	15th
2025	Honda HRC Castrol	Honda RC213V	(Japan) Takaaki Nakagami	1 (3)	0	0	0	0	0 (10)	23rd
2026	Honda HRC Castrol	Honda RC213V	(Italy) Luca Marini	18	0	0	0	0	117*	13th*
2026	Honda HRC Castrol	Honda RC213V	(Spain) Joan Mir	15	0	0	0	0	33*	18th*
2026	Honda HRC Castrol	Honda RC213V	(Japan) Takaaki Nakagami	1	0	0	0	0	3*	27th*
2026	Honda HRC Castrol	Honda RC213V	(Thailand) Somkiat Chantra	1	0	0	0	0	3*	26th*
2026	Honda HRC Castrol	Honda RC213V	(Spain) Aleix Espargaró	0	0	0	0	0	0*	33rd*
2026	Honda HRC Castrol	Honda RC213V	(United Kingdom) Jake Dixon	1	0	0	0	0	2*	28th*

=== By year ===
Year	Entrants	Bike	Tyres	No.	Riders	Race																				Championships					
Year	Entrants	Bike	Tyres	No.	Riders	Race																				Riders		Teams		Manufacturers	
Year	Entrants	Bike	Tyres	No.	Riders	1	2	3	4	5	6	7	8	9	10	11	12	13	14	15	16	17	18	19	20	Pts	Pos	Pts	Pos	Pts	Pos
2002	Repsol Honda Team	Honda RC211V	M			JPN	SAF	ESP	FRA	ITA	CAT	NED	GBR	GER	CZE	POR	RIO	PAC	MAL	AUS	VAL										
2002	Repsol Honda Team	Honda RC211V	M	11	(Japan) Tohru Ukawa	Ret	1	3	2	3	2	5	WD	3	3	3	Ret	4	4	3	5					209	3rd	564	1st	390	1st
2002	Repsol Honda Team	Honda RC211V	M	46	(Italy) Valentino Rossi	1	2	1	1	1	1	1	1	1	Ret	1	1	2	2	1	2					355	1st	564	1st	390	1st
2003	Repsol Honda	Honda RC211V	M			JPN	SAF	ESP	FRA	ITA	CAT	NED	GBR	GER	CZE	POR	RIO	PAC	MAL	AUS	VAL										
2003	Repsol Honda	Honda RC211V	M	46	(Italy) Valentino Rossi	1	2	1	2	1	2	3	3	2	1	1	1	2	1	1	1					357	1st	487	1st	395	1st
2003	Repsol Honda	Honda RC211V	M	69	(United States) Nicky Hayden	7	7	Ret	12	12	9	11	8	5	6	9	5	3	4	3	16					130	5th	487	1st	395	1st
2004	Repsol Honda Team	Honda RC211V	M			SAF	ESP	FRA	ITA	CAT	NED	RIO	GER	GBR	CZE	POR	JPN	QAT	MAL	AUS	VAL										
2004	Repsol Honda Team	Honda RC211V	M	4	(Brazil) Alex Barros	4	3	7	6	Ret	Ret	5	2	9	Ret	3	4	4	3	5	6					165	4th	282	4th	355	1st
2004	Repsol Honda Team	Honda RC211V	M	69	(United States) Nicky Hayden	5	5	11	Ret	Ret	5	3	3	4	Ret		Ret	5	4	6	Ret					117	8th	282	4th	355	1st
2005	Repsol Honda Team	Honda RC211V	M			ESP	POR	CHN	FRA	ITA	CAT	NED	USA	GBR	GER	CZE	JPN	MAL	QAT	AUS	TUR	VAL									
2005	Repsol Honda Team	Honda RC211V	M	3	(Italy) Max Biaggi	7	3	5	5	2	6	6	4	Ret	4	3	2	6	Ret	Ret	12	6				173	5th	379	2nd	341	2nd
2005	Repsol Honda Team	Honda RC211V	M	69	(United States) Nicky Hayden	Ret	7	9	6	6	5	4	1	Ret	3	5	7	4	3	2	3	2				206	3rd	379	2nd	341	2nd
2006	Repsol Honda Team	Honda RC211V	M			ESP	QAT	TUR	CHN	FRA	ITA	CAT	NED	GBR	GER	USA	CZE	MAL	AUS	JPN	POR	VAL									
2006	Repsol Honda Team	Honda RC211V	M	26	(Spain) Dani Pedrosa	2	6	14	1	3	4	Ret	3	1	4	2	3	3	15	7	Ret	4				215	5th	467	1st	360	1st
2006	Repsol Honda Team	Honda RC211V	M	69	(United States) Nicky Hayden	3	2	3	2	5	3	2	1	7	3	1	9	4	5	5	Ret	3				252	1st	467	1st	360	1st
2007	Repsol Honda Team	Honda RC212V	M			QAT	ESP	TUR	CHN	FRA	ITA	CAT	GBR	NED	GER	USA	CZE	SMR	POR	JPN	AUS	MAL	VAL								
2007	Repsol Honda Team	Honda RC212V	M	1	(United States) Nicky Hayden	8	7	7	12	Ret	10	11	17	3	3	Ret	3	13	4	9	Ret	9	8			127	8th	369	2nd	313	2nd
2007	Repsol Honda Team	Honda RC212V	M	26	(Spain) Dani Pedrosa	3	2	Ret	4	4	2	3	8	4	1	5	4	Ret	2	Ret	4	3	1			242	2nd	369	2nd	313	2nd
2008	Repsol Honda Team	Honda RC212V	B			QAT	ESP	POR	CHN	FRA	ITA	CAT	GBR	NED	GER	USA	CZE	SMR	IND	JPN	AUS	MAL	VAL								
2008	Repsol Honda Team	Honda RC212V	B	2	(Spain) Dani Pedrosa														8	3	Ret	2	2			249	3rd	404	2nd	315	3rd
2008	Repsol Honda Team	Honda RC212V	M	2	(Spain) Dani Pedrosa	3	1	2	2	4	3	1	3	2	Ret	WD	15	4								249	3rd	404	2nd	315	3rd
2008	Repsol Honda Team	Honda RC212V	M	69	(United States) Nicky Hayden	10	4	Ret	6	8	13	8	7	4	13	5		DNS	2	5	3	4	5			155	6th	404	2nd	315	3rd
2009	Repsol Honda Team	Honda RC212V	B			QAT	JPN	ESP	FRA	ITA	CAT	NED	USA	GER	GBR	CZE	IND	SMR	POR	AUS	MAL	VAL									
2009	Repsol Honda Team	Honda RC212V	B	3	(Spain) Dani Pedrosa	11	3	2	3	Ret	6	Ret	1	3	9	2	10	3	3	3	2	1				234	3rd	394	2nd	297	2nd
2009	Repsol Honda Team	Honda RC212V	B	4	(Italy) Andrea Dovizioso	5	5	8	4	4	4	Ret	Ret	Ret	1	4	4	4	7	6	Ret	8				160	6th	394	2nd	297	2nd
2010	Repsol Honda Team	Honda RC212V	B			QAT	ESP	FRA	ITA	GBR	NED	CAT	GER	USA	CZE	IND	SMR	ARA	JPN	MAL	AUS	POR	VAL								
2010	Repsol Honda Team	Honda RC212V	B	4	(Italy) Andrea Dovizioso	3	6	3	3	2	5	14	5	4	Ret	5	4	Ret	2	2	Ret	3	5			206	5th	451	2nd	342	2nd
2010	Repsol Honda Team	Honda RC212V	B	26	(Spain) Dani Pedrosa	7	2	5	1	8	2	2	1	Ret	2	1	1	2	DNS		DNS	8	7			245	2nd	451	2nd	342	2nd
2011	Repsol Honda Team	Honda RC212V	B			QAT	ESP	POR	FRA	CAT	GBR	NED	ITA	GER	USA	CZE	IND	SMR	ARA	JPN	AUS	MAL	VAL								
2011	Repsol Honda Team	Honda RC212V	B	4	(Italy) Andrea Dovizioso	4	12	4	2	4	2	3	2	4	5	2	5	5	Ret	5	3	C	3			228	3rd	528	1st	405	1st
2011	Repsol Honda Team	Honda RC212V	B	7	(Japan) Hiroshi Aoyama							8														8 (98) (Note: Non-bracketed number refers to the number accumulated with the motorcycle, with number in brackets referring to the total accumulated for the season.)	10th	528	1st	405	1st
2011	Repsol Honda Team	Honda RC212V	B	26	(Spain) Dani Pedrosa	3	2	1	Ret				8	1	3	Ret	2	2	2	1	4	C	5			219	4th	528	1st	405	1st
2011	Repsol Honda Team	Honda RC212V	B	27	(Australia) Casey Stoner	1	Ret	3	1	1	1	2	3	3	1	1	1	3	1	3	1	C	1			350	1st	528	1st	405	1st
2012	Repsol Honda Team	Honda RC213V	B			QAT	ESP	POR	FRA	CAT	GBR	NED	GER	ITA	USA	IND	CZE	RSM	ARA	JPN	MAL	AUS	VAL								
2012	Repsol Honda Team	Honda RC213V	B	1	(Australia) Casey Stoner	3	1	1	3	4	2	1	Ret	8	1	4				5	3	1	3			254	3rd	603	1st	412	1st
2012	Repsol Honda Team	Honda RC213V	B	26	(Spain) Dani Pedrosa	2	3	3	4	2	3	2	1	2	3	1	1	Ret	1	1	1	Ret	1			332	2nd	603	1st	412	1st
2012	Repsol Honda Team	Honda RC213V	B	56	(United Kingdom) Jonathan Rea													8	7							17	21st	603	1st	412	1st
2013	Repsol Honda Team	Honda RC213V	B			QAT	AME	ESP	FRA	ITA	CAT	NED	GER	USA	IND	CZE	GBR	RSM	ARA	MAL	AUS	JPN	VAL								
2013	Repsol Honda Team	Honda RC213V	B	26	(Spain) Dani Pedrosa	4	2	1	1	2	2	4	DNS	5	2	2	3	3	Ret	1	2	3	2			300	3rd	634	1st	389	1st
2013	Repsol Honda Team	Honda RC213V	B	93	(Spain) Marc Márquez	3	1	2	3	Ret	3	2	1	1	1	1	2	2	1	2	DSQ	2	3			334	1st	634	1st	389	1st
2014	Repsol Honda Team	Honda RC213V	B			QAT	AME	ARG	ESP	FRA	ITA	CAT	NED	GER	IND	CZE	GBR	RSM	ARA	JPN	AUS	MAL	VAL								
2014	Repsol Honda Team	Honda RC213V	B	26	(Spain) Dani Pedrosa	3	2	2	3	5	4	3	3	2	4	1	4	3	14	4	Ret	Ret	3			246	4th	608	1st	409	1st
2014	Repsol Honda Team	Honda RC213V	B	93	(Spain) Marc Márquez	1	1	1	1	1	1	1	1	1	1	4	1	15	13	2	Ret	1	1			362	1st	608	1st	409	1st
2015	Repsol Honda Team	Honda RC213V	B			QAT	AME	ARG	ESP	FRA	ITA	CAT	NED	GER	IND	CZE	GBR	RSM	ARA	JPN	AUS	MAL	VAL								
2015	Repsol Honda Team	Honda RC213V	B	7	(Japan) Hiroshi Aoyama		11	Ret	Ret																	5	25th	453	2nd	355	2nd
2015	Repsol Honda Team	Honda RC213V	B	26	(Spain) Dani Pedrosa	6				16	4	3	8	2	4	5	5	9	2	1	5	1	3			206	4th	453	2nd	355	2nd
2015	Repsol Honda Team	Honda RC213V	B	93	(Spain) Marc Márquez	5	1	Ret	2	4	Ret	Ret	2	1	1	2	Ret	1	Ret	4	1	Ret	2			242	3rd	453	2nd	355	2nd
2016	Repsol Honda Team	Honda RC213V	M			QAT	ARG	AME	ESP	FRA	ITA	CAT	NED	GER	AUT	CZE	GBR	RSM	ARA	JPN	AUS	MAL	VAL								
2016	Repsol Honda Team	Honda RC213V	M	7	(Japan) Hiroshi Aoyama																	16				1	25th	454	2nd	369	1st
2016	Repsol Honda Team	Honda RC213V	M	73	(Japan) Hiroshi Aoyama															15						1	25th	454	2nd	369	1st
2016	Repsol Honda Team	Honda RC213V	M	26	(Spain) Dani Pedrosa	5	3	Ret	4	4	4	3	12	6	7	12	5	1	6	DNS			Ret			155	6th	454	2nd	369	1st
2016	Repsol Honda Team	Honda RC213V	M	69	(United States) Nicky Hayden																17					0 (1)	26th	454	2nd	369	1st
2016	Repsol Honda Team	Honda RC213V	M	93	(Spain) Marc Márquez	3	1	1	3	13	2	2	2	1	5	3	4	4	1	1	Ret	11	2			298	1st	454	2nd	369	1st
2017	Repsol Honda Team	Honda RC213V	M			QAT	ARG	AME	ESP	FRA	ITA	CAT	NED	GER	CZE	AUT	GBR	RSM	ARA	JPN	AUS	MAL	VAL								
2017	Repsol Honda Team	Honda RC213V	M	26	(Spain) Dani Pedrosa	5	Ret	3	1	3	Ret	3	13	3	2	3	7	14	2	Ret	12	5	1			210	4th	508	1st	357	1st
2017	Repsol Honda Team	Honda RC213V	M	93	(Spain) Marc Márquez	4	Ret	1	2	Ret	6	2	3	1	1	2	Ret	1	1	2	1	4	3			298	1st	508	1st	357	1st
2018	Repsol Honda Team	Honda RC213V	M			QAT	ARG	AME	ESP	FRA	ITA	CAT	NED	GER	CZE	AUT	GBR	RSM	ARA	THA	JPN	AUS	MAL	VAL							
2018	Repsol Honda Team	Honda RC213V	M	26	(Spain) Dani Pedrosa	7	Ret	7	Ret	5	Ret	5	15	8	8	7	C	6	5	Ret	8	Ret	5	5		117	11th	438	1st	375	1st
2018	Repsol Honda Team	Honda RC213V	M	93	(Spain) Marc Márquez	2	18	1	1	1	16	2	1	1	3	2	C	2	1	1	1	Ret	1	Ret		321	1st	438	1st	375	1st
2019	Repsol Honda Team	Honda RC213V	M			QAT	ARG	AME	ESP	FRA	ITA	CAT	NED	GER	CZE	AUT	GBR	RSM	ARA	THA	JPN	AUS	MAL	VAL							
2019	Repsol Honda Team	Honda RC213V	M	6	(Germany) Stefan Bradl									10	15	13										10 (16)	21st	458	1st	426	1st
2019	Repsol Honda Team	Honda RC213V	M	93	(Spain) Marc Márquez	2	1	Ret	1	1	2	1	2	1	1	2	2	1	1	1	1	1	2	1		420	1st	458	1st	426	1st
2019	Repsol Honda Team	Honda RC213V	M	99	(Spain) Jorge Lorenzo	13	12	Ret	12	11	13	Ret	DNS				14	14	20	18	17	16	14	13		28	19th	458	1st	426	1st
2020	Repsol Honda Team	Honda RC213V	M			SPA	ANC	CZE	AUT	STY	RSM	EMI	CAT	FRA	ARA	TER	EUR	VAL	POR												
2020	Repsol Honda Team	Honda RC213V	M	6	(Germany) Stefan Bradl			18	17	18	18	DNS	17	8	17	12	12	14	7							27	19th	101	9th	144	5th
2020	Repsol Honda Team	Honda RC213V	M	73	(Spain) Álex Márquez	12	8	15	14	16	17	7	13	2	2	Ret	Ret	16	9							74	14th	101	9th	144	5th
2020	Repsol Honda Team	Honda RC213V	M	93	(Spain) Marc Márquez	Ret	DNS																			0	NC	101	9th	144	5th
2021	Repsol Honda Team	Honda RC213V	M			QAT	DOH	POR	SPA	FRA	ITA	CAT	GER	NED	STY	AUT	GBR	ARA	RSM	AME	EMI	ALR	VAL								
2021	Repsol Honda Team	Honda RC213V	M	6	(Germany) Stefan Bradl	11	14															15				8 (14)	22nd	250	5th	214	4th
2021	Repsol Honda Team	Honda RC213V	M	44	(Spain) Pol Espargaró	8	13	Ret	10	8	12	Ret	10	10	16	16	5	13	7	10	2	6	DNS			100	12th	250	5th	214	4th
2021	Repsol Honda Team	Honda RC213V	M	93	(Spain) Marc Márquez			7	9	Ret	Ret	Ret	1	7	8	15	Ret	2	4	1	1					142	7th	250	5th	214	4th
2022	Repsol Honda Team	Honda RC213V	M			QAT	INA	ARG	AME	POR	SPA	FRA	ITA	CAT	GER	NED	GBR	AUT	RSM	ARA	JPN	THA	AUS	MAL	VAL						
2022	Repsol Honda Team	Honda RC213V	M	6	(Germany) Stefan Bradl			19						Ret	16	18	19	17	14							2	26th	171	9th	155	6th
2022	Repsol Honda Team	Honda RC213V	M	44	(Spain) Pol Espargaró	3	12	Ret	13	9	11	11	Ret	17	Ret	DNS	14	16	Ret	15	12	14	11	14	Ret	56	16th	171	9th	155	6th
2022	Repsol Honda Team	Honda RC213V	M	93	(Spain) Marc Márquez	5	DNS		6	6	4	6	10							Ret	4	5	2	7	Ret	113	13th	171	9th	155	6th
2023	Repsol Honda Team	Honda RC213V	M			POR	ARG	AME	SPA	FRA	ITA	GER	NED	GBR	AUT	CAT	RSM	IND	JPN	INA	AUS	THA	MAL	QAT	VAL						
2023	Repsol Honda Team	Honda RC213V	M	6	(Germany) Stefan Bradl			Ret																		0 (8)	26th	122	9th	185	5th
2023	Repsol Honda Team	Honda RC213V	M	27	(Spain) Iker Lecuona				16				Ret													0	30th	122	9th	185	5th
2023	Repsol Honda Team	Honda RC213V	M	36	(Spain) Joan Mir	11	DNS	Ret	Ret	Ret	DNS			Ret	Ret	17	Ret	5	12	Ret	Ret	12	Ret	14	DNS	26	22nd	122	9th	185	5th
2023	Repsol Honda Team	Honda RC213V	M	93	(Spain) Marc Márquez	Ret^{3}				Ret^{5}	Ret^{7}	DNS	DNS	Ret	12	13	7	9^{3}	3^{7}	Ret	15	6^{4}	13	13	Ret^{3}	96	14th	122	9th	185	5th
2024	Repsol Honda Team	Honda RC213V	M			QAT	POR	AME	SPA	FRA	CAT	ITA	NED	GER	GBR	AUT	ARA	RSM	EMI	INA	JPN	AUS	THA	MAL	SLD						
2024	Repsol Honda Team	Honda RC213V	M	10	(Italy) Luca Marini	20	17	16	17	16	17	20	17	15	17	Ret	17	DNS	12	Ret	14	14	12	15	16	14	22nd	35	11th	75	5th
2024	Repsol Honda Team	Honda RC213V	M	36	(Spain) Joan Mir	13	12	Ret	12^{9}	Ret	15	Ret	Ret	18	Ret	17	14	WD	11	Ret	Ret	Ret	15	Ret	Ret	21	21st	35	11th	75	5th

Year	Entrants	Bike	Tyres	No.	Riders	Race																						Championships					
Year	Entrants	Bike	Tyres	No.	Riders	Race																						Riders		Teams		Manufacturers	
Year	Entrants	Bike	Tyres	No.	Riders	1	2	3	4	5	6	7	8	9	10	11	12	13	14	15	16	17	18	19	20	21	22	Pts	Pos	Pts	Pos	Pts	Pos
2025	Honda HRC Castrol	Honda RC213V	M			THA	ARG	AME	QAT	SPA	FRA	GBR	ARA	ITA	NED	GER	CZE	AUT	HUN	CAT	RSM	JPN	INA	AUS	MAL	POR	VAL						
2025	Honda HRC Castrol	Honda RC213V	M	10	(Italy) Luca Marini	12	10	8^{8}	10	10	11	15				6	12	13	5^{4}	8^{8}	7^{7}	Ret^{7}	5	6^{8}	8	11	7	142	13th	238	8th	285	4th
2025	Honda HRC Castrol	Honda RC213V	M	36	(Spain) Joan Mir	Ret^{9}	9^{8}	Ret	Ret	Ret^{9}	Ret^{9}	10	7	11	Ret	Ret	Ret	6	Ret^{6}	12	Ret	3^{4}	Ret^{5}	Ret	3	Ret	13	96	15th	238	8th	285	4th
2025	Honda HRC Castrol	Honda RC213V	M	30	(Japan) Takaaki Nakagami									16														0 (10)	23rd	238	8th	285	4th
2025	Honda HRC Castrol	Honda RC213V	M	41	(Spain) Aleix Espargaró										16													0	28th	238	8th	285	4th
2026	Honda HRC Castrol	Honda RC213V	M			THA	BRA	USA	SPA	FRA	CAT	ITA	HUN	CZE	NED	GER	GBR	ARA	RSM	AUT	JPN	INA	AUS	MAL	QAT	POR	VAL						
2026	Honda HRC Castrol	Honda RC213V	M	10	(Italy) Luca Marini	10	11	9^{5}	13^{9}	10	6	13	5	8	10	8	9	14	9^{9}	14	10	12	C	7	DNS			117*	13th*	158*	8th*	190*	4th*
2026	Honda HRC Castrol	Honda RC213V	M	36	(Spain) Joan Mir	Ret^{7}	Ret	Ret	15	Ret^{6}	13	12	Ret	5	Ret	Ret^{7}	Ret	12	Ret					Ret				33*	18th*	158*	8th*	190*	4th*
2026	Honda HRC Castrol	Honda RC213V	M	30	(Japan) Takaaki Nakagami															13								3*	27th*	158*	8th*	190*	4th*
2026	Honda HRC Castrol	Honda RC213V	M	15	(Thailand) Somkiat Chantra																13							3*	26th*	158*	8th*	190*	4th*
2026	Honda HRC Castrol	Honda RC213V	M	41	(Spain) Aleix Espargaró																	DNS						0*	33rd*	158*	8th*	190*	4th*
2026	Honda HRC Castrol	Honda RC213V	M	96	(United Kingdom) Jake Dixon																				14			2*	28th*	158*	8th*	190*	4th*

== See also ==
- Honda
- Honda in motorsport
- Honda Racing Corporation
- Honda racing motorcycles
