= 2025 Portuguese motorcycle Grand Prix =

Motorcycle races in Portimão

(Portugal) 2025 Portuguese Grand Prix
Race details
- Race 21 of 22 races in the 2025 Grand Prix motorcycle racing season
- Date: 9 November 2025
- Official name: Qatar Airways Grand Prix of Portugal
- Location: Autódromo Internacional do Algarve; Portimão, Algarve, Portugal
- Course: Permanent racing facility; 4.592 km (2.853 mi)

MotoGP
Pole position
Rider	(Italy) Marco Bezzecchi	Aprilia
Time	1:37.556	
Fastest lap
Rider	(Spain) Pedro Acosta	KTM
Time	1:38.237 on lap 3	
Podium
First	(Italy) Marco Bezzecchi	Aprilia
Second	(Spain) Álex Márquez	Ducati
Third	(Spain) Pedro Acosta	KTM

Moto2
Pole position
Rider	(Brazil) Diogo Moreira	Kalex
Time	1:41.168	
Fastest lap
Rider	(Netherlands) Collin Veijer	Kalex
Time	1:41.225 on lap 7	
Podium
First	(Brazil) Diogo Moreira	Kalex
Second	(Netherlands) Collin Veijer	Kalex
Third	(Colombia) David Alonso	Kalex

Moto3
Pole position
Rider	(Australia) Joel Kelso	KTM
Time	1:46.764	
Fastest lap
Rider	(Spain) David Almansa	Honda
Time	1:46.881 on lap 17	
Podium
First	(Spain) Máximo Quiles	KTM
Second	(Spain) Ángel Piqueras	KTM
Third	(Japan) Taiyo Furusato	Honda

MotoE Race 1
Pole position
Rider	(Italy) Alessandro Zaccone	Ducati
Time	1:58.650	
Fastest lap
Rider	(Romania) Jacopo Hosciuc	Ducati
Time	1:46.530 on lap 3	
Podium
First	(Italy) Alessandro Zaccone	Ducati
Second	(Brazil) Eric Granado	Ducati
Third	(Romania) Jacopo Hosciuc	Ducati

MotoE Race 2
Pole position
Rider	(Italy) Alessandro Zaccone	Ducati
Time	1:58.650	
Fastest lap
Rider	(Italy) Lorenzo Baldassarri	Ducati
Time	1:46.840 on lap 3	
Podium
First	(Spain) Óscar Gutiérrez	Ducati
Second	(Italy) Mattia Casadei	Ducati
Third	(Italy) Nicholas Spinelli	Ducati

The 2025 Portuguese motorcycle Grand Prix (officially known as the Qatar Airways Grand Prix of Portugal) was the twenty-first round of the 2025 Grand Prix motorcycle racing season and the seventh and final round of the 2025 MotoE World Championship. All races (except for both MotoE races which were held on 8 November) were held at the Autódromo Internacional do Algarve in Portimão on 9 November 2025.

== Practice session ==
=== MotoGP ===
==== Combined Free Practice 1-2 ====
Practice times (written in bold) are the fastest times in the session.

Fastest session lap

Pos.	No.	Biker	Team	Constructor	Practice times	
Pos.	No.	Biker	Team	Constructor	FP1	FP2
1	73	(Spain) Álex Márquez	BK8 Gresini Racing MotoGP	Ducati	1:39.145	1:41.657
2	72	(Italy) Marco Bezzecchi	Aprilia Racing	Aprilia	1:39.341	1:41.963
3	43	(Australia) Jack Miller	Prima Pramac Yamaha MotoGP	Yamaha	1:39.378	1:42.606
4	5	(France) Johann Zarco	Castrol Honda LCR	Honda	1:39.494	1:42.125
5	44	(Spain) Pol Espargaró	Red Bull KTM Tech3	Ducati	1:39.506	1:42.516
6	21	(Italy) Franco Morbidelli	Pertamina Enduro VR46 Racing Team	Ducati	1:39.534	1:46.455
7	10	(Italy) Luca Marini	Honda HRC Castrol	Honda	1:39.549	1:44.178
8	36	(Spain) Joan Mir	Honda HRC Castrol	Honda	1:39.550	1:41.677
9	37	(Spain) Pedro Acosta	Red Bull KTM Factory Racing	KTM	1:39.666	1:42.073
10	54	(Spain) Fermín Aldeguer	BK8 Gresini Racing MotoGP	Ducati	1:39.685	1:41.654
11	20	(France) Fabio Quartararo	Monster Energy Yamaha MotoGP Team	Yamaha	1:39.732	1:43.431
12	49	(Italy) Fabio Di Giannantonio	Pertamina Enduro VR46 Racing Team	Ducati	1:39.737	1:42.833
13	79	(Japan) Ai Ogura	Trackhouse MotoGP Team	Aprilia	1:39.986	1:44.590
14	11	(Italy) Nicolò Bulega	Ducati Lenovo Team	Ducati	1:40.073	1:42.833
15	33	(South Africa) Brad Binder	Red Bull KTM Factory Racing	KTM	1:40.185	1:42.682
16	42	(Spain) Álex Rins	Monster Energy Yamaha MotoGP Team	Yamaha	1:40.221	1:45.631
17	63	(Italy) Francesco Bagnaia	Ducati Lenovo Team	Ducati	1:40.306	1:42.012
18	25	(Spain) Raúl Fernández	Trackhouse MotoGP Team	Aprilia	1:40.349	1:42.507
19	23	(Italy) Enea Bastianini	Red Bull KTM Tech3	KTM	1:40.400	1:44.259
20	88	(Portugal) Miguel Oliveira	Prima Pramac Yamaha MotoGP	Yamaha	1:40.857	1:43.410
21	35	(Thailand) Somkiat Chantra	IDEMITSU Honda LCR	Honda	1:41.263	1:43.339
22	32	(Italy) Lorenzo Savadori	Aprilia Racing	Aprilia	1:41.520	1:44.099
OFFICIAL MOTOGP COMBINED PRACTICE TIMES REPORT

==== Practice ====
The top 10 riders (written in bold) qualified for Q2.

Fastest session lap

Pos.	No.	Biker	Team	Constructor	
Pos.	No.	Biker	Team	Constructor	Time results
1	73	(Spain) **Álex Márquez**	**BK8 Gresini Racing MotoGP**	**Ducati**	**1:37.974**
2	63	(Italy) **Francesco Bagnaia**	**Ducati Lenovo Team**	**Ducati**	**1:38.004**
3	37	(Spain) **Pedro Acosta**	**Red Bull KTM Factory Racing**	**KTM**	**1:38.062**
4	72	(Italy) **Marco Bezzecchi**	**Aprilia Racing**	**Aprilia**	**1:38.133**
5	36	(Spain) **Joan Mir**	**Honda HRC Castrol**	**Honda**	**1:38.183**
6	5	(France) **Johann Zarco**	**CASTROL Honda LCR**	**Honda**	**1:38.232**
7	49	(Italy) **Fabio Di Giannantonio**	**Pertamina Enduro VR46 Racing Team**	**Ducati**	**1:38.302**
8	54	(Spain) **Fermín Aldeguer**	**BK8 Gresini Racing MotoGP**	**Ducati**	**1:38.382**
9	44	(Spain) **Pol Espargaró**	**Red Bull KTM Tech3**	**KTM**	**1:38.424**
10	79	(Japan) **Ai Ogura**	**Trackhouse MotoGP Team**	**Aprilia**	**1:38.433**
11	10	(Italy) Luca Marini	Honda HRC Castrol	Honda	1:38.551
12	21	(Italy) Franco Morbidelli	Pertamina Enduro VR46 Racing Team	Ducati	1:38.597
13	20	(France) Fabio Quartararo	Monster Energy Yamaha MotoGP Team	Yamaha	1:38.598
14	33	(South Africa) Brad Binder	Red Bull KTM Factory Racing	KTM	1:38.653
15	25	(Spain) Raúl Fernández	Trackhouse MotoGP Team	Aprilia	1:38.762
16	43	(Australia) Jack Miller	Prima Pramac Yamaha MotoGP	Yamaha	1:38.874
17	11	(Italy) Nicolò Bulega	Ducati Lenovo Team	Ducati	1:38.886
18	42	(Spain) Álex Rins	Monster Energy Yamaha MotoGP Team	Yamaha	1:39.070
19	23	(Italy) Enea Bastianini	Red Bull KTM Tech3	KTM	1:39.130
20	35	(Thailand) Somkiat Chantra	IDEMITSU Honda LCR	Honda	1:39.798
21	32	(Italy) Lorenzo Savadori	Aprilia Racing	Aprilia	1:39.858
22	88	(Portugal) Miguel Oliveira	Prima Pramac Yamaha MotoGP	Yamaha	1:39.881
OFFICIAL MOTOGP PRACTICE TIMES REPORT

== Qualifying ==
=== MotoGP ===
Fastest session lap

Pos.	No.	Biker	Team	Constructor	Qualifying times		Final grid	Row
Pos.	No.	Biker	Team	Constructor	Q1	Q2	Final grid	Row
1	72	(Italy) Marco Bezzecchi	Aprilia Racing	Aprilia	Qualified in Q2	1:37.556	1	1
2	37	(Spain) Pedro Acosta	Red Bull KTM Factory Racing	KTM	Qualified in Q2	1:37.706	2	1
3	20	(France) Fabio Quartararo	Monster Energy Yamaha MotoGP Team	Yamaha	1:38.661	1:37.860	3	1
4	63	(Italy) Francesco Bagnaia	Ducati Lenovo Team	Ducati	Qualified in Q2	1:37.935	4	2
5	73	(Spain) Álex Márquez	BK8 Gresini Racing MotoGP	Ducati	Qualified in Q2	1:37.987	5	2
6	5	(France) Johann Zarco	Castrol Honda LCR	Honda	Qualified in Q2	1:38.059	6	2
7	36	(Spain) Joan Mir	Honda HRC Castrol	Honda	Qualified in Q2	1:38.177	7	3
8	43	(Australia) Jack Miller	Prima Pramac Yamaha MotoGP	Yamaha	1:38.914	1:38.217	8	3
9	49	(Italy) Fabio Di Giannantonio	Pertamina Enduro VR46 Racing Team	Ducati	Qualified in Q2	1:38.425	9	3
10	44	(Spain) Pol Espargaró	Red Bull KTM Tech3	KTM	Qualified in Q2	1:38.449	10	4
11	54	(Spain) Fermín Aldeguer	BK8 Gresini Racing MotoGP	Ducati	Qualified in Q2	1:38.492	11	4
12	79	(Japan) Ai Ogura	Trackhouse MotoGP Team	Aprilia	Qualified in Q2	1:38.525	12	4
13	10	(Italy) Luca Marini	Honda HRC Castrol	Honda	1:39.003	N/A	13	5
14	33	(South Africa) Brad Binder	Red Bull KTM Factory Racing	KTM	1:39.360	N/A	14	5
15	21	(Italy) Franco Morbidelli	Pertamina Enduro VR46 Racing Team	Ducati	1:39.380	N/A	15	5
16	23	(Italy) Enea Bastianini	Red Bull KTM Tech3	KTM	1:39.635	N/A	16	6
17	42	(Spain) Álex Rins	Monster Energy Yamaha MotoGP Team	Yamaha	1:39.654	N/A	17	6
18	11	(Italy) Nicolò Bulega	Ducati Lenovo Team	Ducati	1:39.674	N/A	18	6
19	88	(Portugal) Miguel Oliveira	Prima Pramac Yamaha MotoGP	Yamaha	1:39.869	N/A	19	7
20	32	(Italy) Lorenzo Savadori	Aprilia Racing	Aprilia	1:39.903	N/A	20	7
21	35	(Thailand) Somkiat Chantra	IDEMITSU Honda LCR	Honda	1:40.201	N/A	21	7
22	25	(Spain) Raúl Fernández	Trackhouse MotoGP Team	Aprilia	1.38.762	N/A	22	8
OFFICIAL MOTOGP QUALIFYING TIMES REPORT

=== Moto2 ===
Fastest session lap

Pos.	No.	Biker	Team	Constructor	Qualifying times		Final grid	Row
Pos.	No.	Biker	Team	Constructor	Q1	Q2	Final grid	Row
1	10	(Brazil) Diogo Moreira	Italtrans Racing Team	Kalex	Qualified in Q2	1:41.168	1	1
2	96	(United Kingdom) Jake Dixon	Elf Marc VDS Racing Team	Boscoscuro	Qualified in Q2	1:41.185	2	1
3	95	(Netherlands) Collin Veijer	Red Bull KTM Ajo	Kalex	Qualified in Q2	1:41.317	3	1
4	7	(Belgium) Barry Baltus	Fantic Racing Lino Sonego	Kalex	Qualified in Q2	1:41.337	4	2
5	44	(Spain) Arón Canet	Fantic Racing Lino Sonego	Kalex	Qualified in Q2	1:41.355	5	2
6	27	(Spain) Daniel Holgado	CFMoto Inde Aspar Team	Kalex	Qualified in Q2	1:41.404	6	2
7	17	(Spain) Daniel Muñoz	Red Bull KTM Ajo	Kalex	1:41.555	1:41.441	10 (Note: 3-place grid penalty for riding slowly on the racing line.)	4
8	18	(Spain) Manuel González	Liqui Moly Dynavolt Intact GP	Kalex	Qualified in Q2	1:41.499	7	3
9	13	(Italy) Celestino Vietti	Beta Tools SpeedRS Team	Boscoscuro	Qualified in Q2	1:41.555	8	3
10	80	(Colombia) David Alonso	CFMoto Inde Aspar Team	Kalex	Qualified in Q2	1:41.603	9	3
11	11	(Spain) Álex Escrig	Klint Forward Factory Team	Forward	1:42.015	1:41.614	11	4
12	21	(Spain) Alonso López	Beta Tools SpeedRS Team	Boscoscuro	Qualified in Q2	1:41.681	15	5
13	84	(Netherlands) Zonta van den Goorbergh	RW-Idrofoglia Racing GP	Kalex	1:41.955	1:41.718	12	4
14	81	(Australia) Senna Agius	Liqui Moly Dynavolt Intact GP	Kalex	Qualified in Q2	1:41.749	13	5
15	14	(Italy) Tony Arbolino	Blu Cru Pramac Yamaha Moto2	Boscoscuro	Qualified in Q2	1:41.752	14	5
16	75	(Spain) Albert Arenas	Italjet Gresini Moto2	Kalex	Qualified in Q2	1:41.947	16	6
17	12	(Czech Republic) Filip Salač	Elf Marc VDS Racing Team	Boscoscuro	1:41.767	1:42.129	17	6
18	28	(Spain) Izan Guevara	Blu Cru Pramac Yamaha Moto2	Boscoscuro	Qualified in Q2	1:42.163	18	6
19	99	(Spain) Adrián Huertas	Italtrans Racing Team	Kalex	1:42.022	N/A	19	7
20	9	(Spain) Jorge Navarro	Klint Forward Factory Team	Forward	1:42.115	N/A	20	7
21	4	(Spain) Iván Ortolá	QJMotor – Frinsa – MSi	Boscoscuro	1:42.161	N/A	21	7
22	64	(Indonesia) Mario Aji	Idemitsu Honda Team Asia	Kalex	1:42.198	N/A	22	8
23	71	(Japan) Ayumu Sasaki	RW-Idrofoglia Racing GP	Kalex	1:42.397	N/A	23	8
24	3	(Spain) Sergio García	Italjet Gresini Moto2	Kalex	1:42.425	N/A	24	8
25	24	(Spain) Marcos Ramírez	OnlyFans American Racing Team	Kalex	1:42.482	N/A	25	9
26	61	(Spain) Eric Fernández	QJMotor – Frinsa – MSi	Boscoscuro	1:43.030	N/A	26	9
27	85	(Spain) Xabi Zurutuza	OnlyFans American Racing Team	Kalex	1:43.536	N/A	27	9
28	92	(Japan) Yuki Kunii	Idemitsu Honda Team Asia	Kalex	1:44.094	N/A	28	10
29	91	(Italy) Alessandro Morosi	Fantic Racing Lino Sonego	Kalex	1:44.383	N/A	29	10
OFFICIAL MOTO2 QUALIFYING TIMES REPORT

=== Moto3 ===
Fastest session lap

Pos.	No.	Biker	Team	Constructor	Qualifying times		Final grid	Row
Pos.	No.	Biker	Team	Constructor	Q1	Q2	Final grid	Row
1	66	(Australia) Joel Kelso	LevelUp – MTA	KTM	Qualified in Q2	1:46.764	1	1
2	19	(United Kingdom) Scott Ogden	CIP Green Power	KTM	Qualified in Q2	1:46.833	2	1
3	36	(Spain) Ángel Piqueras	Frinsa – MT Helmets – MSi	KTM	Qualified in Q2	1:46.927	3	1
4	28	(Spain) Máximo Quiles	CFMoto Gaviota Aspar Team	KTM	Qualified in Q2	1:47.044	4	2
5	94	(Italy) Guido Pini	Liqui Moly Dynavolt Intact GP	KTM	1:47.905	1:47.061	5	2
6	78	(Spain) Joel Esteban	Red Bull KTM Tech3	KTM	1:47.679	1:47.067	6	2
7	67	(Republic of Ireland) Casey O'Gorman	Liqui Moly Dynavolt Intact GP	KTM	Qualified in Q2	1:47.159	7	3
8	31	(Spain) Adrián Fernández	Leopard Racing	Honda	Qualified in Q2	1:47.189	8	3
9	22	(Spain) David Almansa	Leopard Racing	Honda	Qualified in Q2	1:47.202	9	3
10	73	(Argentina) Valentín Perrone	Red Bull KTM Tech3	KTM	Qualified in Q2	1:47.231	10	4
11	72	(Japan) Taiyo Furusato	Honda Team Asia	Honda	Qualified in Q2	1:47.294	11	4
12	83	(Spain) Álvaro Carpe	Red Bull KTM Ajo	KTM	Qualified in Q2	1:47.429	12	4
13	95	(Argentina) Marco Morelli	Gryd – MLav Racing	Honda	1:47.829	1:47.438	13	5
14	51	(Spain) Brian Uriarte	Red Bull KTM Ajo	KTM	Qualified in Q2	1:47.508	14	5
15	58	(Italy) Luca Lunetta	Sic58 Squadra Corse	Honda	Qualified in Q2	1:47.570	15	5
16	71	(Italy) Dennis Foggia	CFMoto Gaviota Aspar Team	KTM	Qualified in Q2	1:47.665	16	6
17	13	(Malaysia) Hakim Danish	Frinsa – MT Helmets – MSi	KTM	Qualified in Q2	1:47.817	17	6
18	82	(Italy) Stefano Nepa	Sic58 Squadra Corse	Honda	1:47.855	1:48.247	18	6
19	2	(Japan) Zen Mitani	Honda Team Asia	Honda	1:48.570	N/A	19	7
20	18	(Italy) Matteo Bertelle	LevelUp – MTA	KTM	1:48.598	N/A	20	7
21	10	(Italy) Nicola Carraro	Rivacold Snipers Team	Honda	1:48.910	N/A	21	7
22	21	(South Africa) Ruché Moodley	Denssi Racing – Boé	KTM	1:48.930	N/A	22	8
23	8	(United Kingdom) Eddie O'Shea	Gryd – MLav Racing	Honda	1:48.933	N/A	23	8
24	14	(New Zealand) Cormac Buchanan	Denssi Racing – Boé	KTM	1:48.947	N/A	24	8
25	45	(Spain) Jesús Ríos	Rivacold Snipers Team	Honda	1:49.027	N/A	25	9
OFFICIAL MOTO3 QUALIFYING TIMES REPORT

== MotoGP Sprint ==
The MotoGP Sprint was held on 8 November 2025.

Pos.	No.	Rider	Team	Manufacturer	Laps	Time/Retired	Grid	Points
1	73	(Spain) Álex Márquez	BK8 Gresini Racing MotoGP	Ducati	12	19:50.075	5	12
2	37	(Spain) Pedro Acosta	Red Bull KTM Factory Racing	KTM	12	+0.120	2	9
3	72	(Italy) Marco Bezzecchi	Aprilia Racing	Aprilia	12	+0.637	1	7
4	20	(France) Fabio Quartararo	Monster Energy Yamaha MotoGP Team	Yamaha	12	+5.276	3	6
5	49	(Italy) Fabio Di Giannantonio	Pertamina Enduro VR46 Racing Team	Ducati	12	+6.088	9	5
6	54	(Spain) Fermín Aldeguer	BK8 Gresini Racing MotoGP	Ducati	12	+8.864	11	4
7	5	(France) Johann Zarco	Castrol Honda LCR	Honda	12	+8.886	6	3
8	63	(Italy) Francesco Bagnaia	Ducati Lenovo Team	Ducati	12	+8.898	4	2
9	33	(South Africa) Brad Binder	Red Bull KTM Factory Racing	KTM	12	+9.052	14	1
10	44	(Spain) Pol Espargaró	Red Bull KTM Tech3	KTM	12	+10.121	10	
11	79	(Japan) Ai Ogura	Trackhouse MotoGP Team	Aprilia	12	+10.290	12	
12	10	(Italy) Luca Marini	Honda HRC Castrol	Honda	12	+12.016	13	
13	23	(Italy) Enea Bastianini	Red Bull KTM Tech3	KTM	12	+13.469	16	
14	43	(Australia) Jack Miller	Prima Pramac Yamaha MotoGP	Yamaha	12	+13.900	8	
15	21	(Italy) Franco Morbidelli	Pertamina Enduro VR46 Racing Team	Ducati	12	+14.520	15	
16	88	(Portugal) Miguel Oliveira	Prima Pramac Yamaha MotoGP	Yamaha	12	+15.289	19	
17	42	(Spain) Álex Rins	Monster Energy Yamaha MotoGP Team	Yamaha	12	+22.861	17	
18	32	(Italy) Lorenzo Savadori	Aprilia Racing	Aprilia	12	+25.456	20	
Ret	11	(Italy) Nicolò Bulega	Ducati Lenovo Team	Ducati	3	Accident	18	
Ret	36	(Spain) Joan Mir	Honda HRC Castrol	Honda	3	Retired	21	
Ret	35	(Thailand) Somkiat Chantra	IDEMITSU Honda LCR	Honda	2	Retired	7	
DNS	25	(Spain) Raúl Fernández	Trackhouse MotoGP Team	Aprilia		Did not start		
Fastest sprint lap: (Spain) Pedro Acosta (KTM) – 1:37.937 (lap 2)
OFFICIAL MOTOGP SPRINT REPORT

== Race ==
=== MotoGP ===
Pos.	No.	Rider	Team	Manufacturer	Laps	Time/Retired	Grid	Points
1	72	(Italy) Marco Bezzecchi	Aprilia Racing	Aprilia	25	41:13.616	1	25
2	73	(Spain) Álex Márquez	BK8 Gresini Racing MotoGP	Ducati	25	+2.583	5	20
3	37	(Spain) Pedro Acosta	Red Bull KTM Factory Racing	KTM	25	+3.188	2	16
4	54	(Spain) Fermín Aldeguer	BK8 Gresini Racing MotoGP	Ducati	25	+12.860	11	13
5	33	(South Africa) Brad Binder	Red Bull KTM Factory Racing	KTM	25	+16.327	14	11
6	20	(France) Fabio Quartararo	Monster Energy Yamaha MotoGP Team	Yamaha	25	+18.442	3	10
7	79	(Japan) Ai Ogura	Trackhouse MotoGP Team	Aprilia	25	+19.255	12	9
8	49	(Italy) Fabio Di Giannantonio	Pertamina Enduro VR46 Racing Team	Ducati	25	+20.612	9	8
9	5	(France) Johann Zarco	Castrol Honda LCR	Honda	25	+21.040	6	7
10	44	(Spain) Pol Espargaró	Red Bull KTM Tech3	KTM	25	+26.517	10	6
11	10	(Italy) Luca Marini	Honda HRC Castrol	Honda	25	+28.226	13	5
12	43	(Australia) Jack Miller	Prima Pramac Yamaha MotoGP	Yamaha	25	+29.717	8	4
13	42	(Spain) Álex Rins	Monster Energy Yamaha MotoGP Team	Yamaha	25	+30.372	17	3
14	88	(Portugal) Miguel Oliveira	Prima Pramac Yamaha MotoGP	Yamaha	25	+31.621	19	2
15	11	(Italy) Nicolò Bulega	Ducati Lenovo Team	Ducati	25	+32.072	18	1
16	32	(Italy) Lorenzo Savadori	Aprilia Racing	Aprilia	25	+39.869	20	
17	35	(Thailand) Somkiat Chantra	IDEMITSU Honda LCR	Honda	25	+1:01.999	21	
18	23	(Italy) Enea Bastianini	Red Bull KTM Tech3	KTM	23	+2 lap	23	
Ret	63	(Italy) Francesco Bagnaia	Ducati Lenovo Team	Ducati	10	Accident	4	
Ret	36	(Spain) Joan Mir	Honda HRC Castrol	Honda	2	Retired	7	
Ret	21	(Italy) Franco Morbidelli	Pertamina Enduro VR46 Racing Team	Ducati	1	Accident	15	
DNS	25	(Spain) Raúl Fernández	Trackhouse MotoGP Team	Aprilia		Did not start		
Fastest lap: (Spain) Pedro Acosta (KTM) – 1:38.237 (lap 3)
OFFICIAL MOTOGP RACE REPORT

=== Moto2 ===
Pos.	No.	Rider	Team	Manufacturer	Laps	Time/Retired	Grid	Points
1	10	(Brazil) Diogo Moreira	Italtrans Racing Team	Kalex	21	35:40.573	1	25
2	95	(Netherlands) Collin Veijer	Red Bull KTM Ajo	Kalex	21	+0.090	3	20
3	80	(Colombia) David Alonso	CFMoto Inde Aspar Team	Kalex	21	+0.492	9	16
4	44	(Spain) Arón Canet	Fantic Racing Lino Sonego	Kalex	21	+0.992	5	13
5	7	(Belgium) Barry Baltus	Fantic Racing Lino Sonego	Kalex	21	+5.214	4	11
6	18	(Spain) Manuel González	Liqui Moly Dynavolt Intact GP	Kalex	21	+7.929	7	10
7	27	(Spain) Daniel Holgado	CFMoto Inde Aspar Team	Kalex	21	+8.376	6	9
8	75	(Spain) Albert Arenas	Italjet Gresini Moto2	Kalex	21	+9.153	16	8
9	81	(Australia) Senna Agius	Liqui Moly Dynavolt Intact GP	Kalex	21	+9.707	13	7
10	28	(Spain) Izan Guevara	Blu Cru Pramac Yamaha Moto2	Boscoscuro	21	+10.018	18	6
11	17	(Spain) Daniel Muñoz	Red Bull KTM Ajo	Kalex	21	+15.042	10	5
12	11	(Spain) Álex Escrig	Klint Forward Factory Team	Forward	21	+15.252	11	4
13	13	(Italy) Celestino Vietti	Beta Tools SpeedRS Team	Boscoscuro	21	+16.556	8	3
14	4	(Spain) Iván Ortolá	QJMotor – Frinsa – MSi	Boscoscuro	21	+17.916	21	2
15	12	(Czech Republic) Filip Salač	Elf Marc VDS Racing Team	Boscoscuro	21	+18.789	17	1
16	84	(Netherlands) Zonta van den Goorbergh	RW-Idrofoglia Racing GP	Kalex	21	+18.833	12	
17	14	(Italy) Tony Arbolino	Blu Cru Pramac Yamaha Moto2	Boscoscuro	21	+20.034	14	
18	99	(Spain) Adrián Huertas	Italtrans Racing Team	Kalex	21	+23.237	19	
19	21	(Spain) Alonso López	Beta Tools SpeedRS Team	Boscoscuro	21	+30.461	15	
20	3	(Spain) Sergio García	Italjet Gresini Moto2	Kalex	21	+32.180	24	
21	64	(Indonesia) Mario Aji	Idemitsu Honda Team Asia	Kalex	21	+33.756	22	
22	9	(Spain) Jorge Navarro	Klint Forward Factory Team	Forward	21	+38.772	20	
23	92	(Japan) Yuki Kunii	Idemitsu Honda Team Asia	Kalex	21	+49.425	28	
24	91	(Italy) Alessandro Morosi	Fantic Racing Lino Sonego	Kalex	21	+1:06.023	29	
Ret	96	(United Kingdom) Jake Dixon	Elf Marc VDS Racing Team	Boscoscuro	20	Accident	2	
Ret	24	(Spain) Marcos Ramírez	OnlyFans American Racing Team	Kalex	14	Retired in pits	25	
Ret	61	(Spain) Eric Fernández	QJMotor – Frinsa – MSi	Boscoscuro	7	Accident	26	
Ret	71	(Japan) Ayumu Sasaki	RW-Idrofoglia Racing GP	Kalex	4	Accident	23	
Ret	85	(Spain) Xabi Zurutuza	OnlyFans American Racing Team	Kalex	2	Accident	27	
Fastest lap: (Netherlands) Collin Veijer (Kalex) – 1:41.225 (lap 7)
OFFICIAL MOTO2 RACE REPORT

=== Moto3 ===
Pos.	No.	Rider	Team	Manufacturer	Laps	Time/Retired	Grid	Points
1	28	(Spain) Máximo Quiles	CFMoto Gaviota Aspar Team	KTM	19	34:05.182	4	25
2	36	(Spain) Ángel Piqueras	Frinsa – MT Helmets – MSi	KTM	19	+1.663	3	20
3	72	(Japan) Taiyo Furusato	Honda Team Asia	Honda	19	+2.886	11	16
4	78	(Spain) Joel Esteban	Red Bull KTM Tech3	KTM	19	+3.243	6	13
5	83	(Spain) Álvaro Carpe	Red Bull KTM Ajo	KTM	19	+3.537	12	11
6	67	(Republic of Ireland) Casey O'Gorman	Liqui Moly Dynavolt Intact GP	KTM	19	+4.123	7	10
7	66	(Australia) Joel Kelso	LevelUp – MTA	KTM	19	+5.345	1	9
8	19	(United Kingdom) Scott Ogden	CIP Green Power	KTM	19	+5.390	2	8
9	31	(Spain) Adrián Fernández	Leopard Racing	Honda	19	+5.483	8	7
10	58	(Italy) Luca Lunetta	Sic58 Squadra Corse	Honda	19	+9.469	15	6
11	95	(Argentina) Marco Morelli	Gryd – MLav Racing	Honda	19	+9.556	13	5
12	13	(Malaysia) Hakim Danish	Frinsa – MT Helmets – MSi	KTM	19	+24.276	17	4
13	51	(Spain) Brian Uriarte	Red Bull KTM Ajo	KTM	19	+24.315	14	3
14	71	(Italy) Dennis Foggia	CFMoto Gaviota Aspar Team	KTM	19	+29.897	16	2
15	10	(Italy) Nicola Carraro	Rivacold Snipers Team	Honda	19	+29.972	21	1
16	8	(United Kingdom) Eddie O'Shea	Gryd – MLav Racing	Honda	19	+30.158	23	
17	21	(South Africa) Ruché Moodley	Denssi Racing – Boé	KTM	19	+30.188	22	
18	82	(Italy) Stefano Nepa	Sic58 Squadra Corse	Honda	19	+30.575	18	
19	2	(Japan) Zen Mitani	Honda Team Asia	Honda	19	+31.669	19	
20	14	(New Zealand) Cormac Buchanan	Denssi Racing – Boé	KTM	19	+39.512	24	
21	22	(Spain) David Almansa	Leopard Racing	Honda	19	+39.522	9	
Ret	94	(Italy) Guido Pini	Liqui Moly Dynavolt Intact GP	KTM	14	Accident	5	
Ret	45	(Spain) Jesús Ríos	Rivacold Snipers Team	Honda	13	Accident	25	
Ret	18	(Italy) Matteo Bertelle	LevelUp – MTA	KTM	13	Accident	20	
Ret	73	(Argentina) Valentín Perrone	Red Bull KTM Tech3	KTM	6	Technical issue	10	
Fastest lap: (Spain) Ángel Piqueras (KTM) – 1:46.881 (lap 17)
OFFICIAL MOTO3 RACE REPORT

=== MotoE ===
==== Race 1 ====
Pos.	No.	Rider	Team	Manufacturer	Laps	Time/Retired	Grid	Points
1	61	(Italy) Alessandro Zaccone	Aruba Cloud MotoE Team	Ducati	6	10:45.714	1	25
2	51	(Brazil) Eric Granado	LCR E-Team	Ducati	6	+0.105	3	20
3	12	(Romania) Jacopo Hosciuc	MSi Racing Team	Ducati	6	+0.185	10	16
4	40	(Italy) Mattia Casadei	LCR E-Team	Ducati	6	+0.740	4	13
5	7	(Italy) Lorenzo Baldassarri	Dynavolt Intact GP	Ducati	6	+1.718	14	11
6	11	(Italy) Matteo Ferrari	Felo Gresini MotoE	Ducati	6	+1.748	8	10
7	29	(Italy) Nicholas Spinelli	Rivacold Snipers Team MotoE	Ducati	6	+4.683	5	9
8	21	(Italy) Kevin Zannoni	Power Electronics Aspar Team	Ducati	6	+5.794	17	8
9	81	(Spain) Jordi Torres	Power Electronics Aspar Team	Ducati	6	+7.010	11	7
10	19	(San Marino) Luca Bernardi	Aruba Cloud MotoE Team	Ducati	6	+7.287	7	6
11	77	(Italy) Raffaele Fusco	Ongetta Sic58 Squadra Corse	Ducati	6	+9.130	6	5
12	1	(Spain) Héctor Garzó	Dynavolt Intact GP	Ducati	6	+10.844	12	4
13	72	(Italy) Alessio Finello	Felo Gresini MotoE	Ducati	6	+10.845	9	3
14	9	(Italy) Andrea Mantovani	Klint Forward Factory Team	Ducati	6	+12.321	13	2
15	6	(Spain) María Herrera	Klint Forward Factory Team	Ducati	6	+16.742	16	1
16	28	(Italy) Tommaso Occhi	Ongetta Sic58 Squadra Corse	Ducati	6	+33.822	18	
Ret	99	(Spain) Óscar Gutiérrez	MSi Racing Team	Ducati	1	Accident	2	
Ret	47	(Hungary) Tibor Erik Varga	Rivacold Snipers Team MotoE	Ducati	1	Accident	15	
Fastest lap: (Romania) Jacopo Hosciuc (Ducati) – 1:46.530 (lap 3)
OFFICIAL MOTOE RACE 1 REPORT

==== Race 2 ====
Pos.	No.	Rider	Team	Manufacturer	Laps	Time/Retired	Grid	Points
1	99	(Spain) Óscar Gutiérrez	MSi Racing Team	Ducati	6	10:45.516	2	25
2	40	(Italy) Mattia Casadei	LCR E-Team	Ducati	6	+0.098	4	20
3	29	(Italy) Nicholas Spinelli	Rivacold Snipers Team MotoE	Ducati	6	+1.281	5	16
4	61	(Italy) Alessandro Zaccone	Aruba Cloud MotoE Team	Ducati	6	+2.105	1	13
5	1	(Spain) Héctor Garzó	Dynavolt Intact GP	Ducati	6	+4.521	12	11
6	11	(Italy) Matteo Ferrari	Felo Gresini MotoE	Ducati	6	+4.669	8	10
7	81	(Spain) Jordi Torres	Power Electronics Aspar Team	Ducati	6	+4.735	11	9
8	19	(San Marino) Luca Bernardi	Aruba Cloud MotoE Team	Ducati	6	+4.983	7	8
9	21	(Italy) Kevin Zannoni	Power Electronics Aspar Team	Ducati	6	+5.001	17	7
10	9	(Italy) Andrea Mantovani	Klint Forward Factory Team	Ducati	6	+6.111	13	6
11	77	(Italy) Raffaele Fusco	Ongetta Sic58 Squadra Corse	Ducati	6	+9.062	6	5
12	72	(Italy) Alessio Finello	Felo Gresini MotoE	Ducati	6	+11.119	9	4
13	6	(Spain) María Herrera	Klint Forward Factory Team	Ducati	6	+11.186	16	3
14	47	(Hungary) Tibor Erik Varga	Rivacold Snipers Team MotoE	Ducati	6	+11.937	15	2
15	28	(Italy) Tommaso Occhi	Ongetta Sic58 Squadra Corse	Ducati	6	+31.953	18	1
Ret	51	(Brazil) Eric Granado	LCR E-Team	Ducati	4	Accident	3	
Ret	12	(Romania) Jacopo Hosciuc	MSi Racing Team	Ducati	4	Accident	10	
Ret	7	(Italy) Lorenzo Baldassarri	Dynavolt Intact GP	Ducati	3	Accident	14	
Fastest lap: (Italy) Lorenzo Baldassarri (Ducati) – 1:46.840 (lap 3)
OFFICIAL MOTOE RACE 2 REPORT

== Championship standings after the race ==
Below are the standings for the top five riders, constructors, and teams after the round.

=== MotoGP ===
Riders' Championship standings

Pos.	Rider	Points
1	(Spain) Marc Márquez	545
2	(Spain) Álex Márquez	445
3	(Italy) Marco Bezzecchi	323
4	(Italy) Francesco Bagnaia	288
5	(Spain) Pedro Acosta	285

Constructors' Championship standings

Pos.	Constructor	Points
1	(Italy) Ducati	740
2	(Italy) Aprilia	387
3	(Austria) KTM	350
4	(Japan) Honda	276
5	(Japan) Yamaha	237

Teams' Championship standings

Pos.	Team	Points
1	(Italy) Ducati Lenovo Team	834
2	(Italy) BK8 Gresini Racing MotoGP	648
3	(Italy) Pertamina Enduro VR46 Racing Team	466
4	(Austria) Red Bull KTM Factory Racing	430
5	(Italy) Aprilia Racing	365

=== Moto2 ===
Riders' Championship standings

	Pos.	Rider	Points
	1	(Brazil) Diogo Moreira	281
	2	(Spain) Manuel González	257
	3	(Belgium) Barry Baltus	232
1	4	(Spain) Arón Canet	226
1	5	(United Kingdom) Jake Dixon	215

Constructors' Championship standings

Pos.	Constructor	Points
1	(Germany) Kalex	498
2	(Italy) Boscoscuro	317
3	(Switzerland) Forward	25

Teams' Championship standings

	Pos.	Team	Points
	1	(Italy) Fantic Racing	458
	2	(Germany) Liqui Moly Dynavolt Intact GP	397
	3	(Spain) CFMoto Inde Aspar Team	341
1	4	(Italy) Italtrans Racing Team	308
1	5	(Belgium) Elf Marc VDS Racing Team	298

=== Moto3 ===
Riders' Championship standings

	Pos.	Rider	Points
	1	(Spain) José Antonio Rueda	365
	2	(Spain) Ángel Piqueras	271
	3	(Spain) Máximo Quiles	263
	4	(Spain) David Muñoz	197
1	5	(Spain) Álvaro Carpe	195

Constructors' Championship standings

Pos.	Constructor	Points
1	(Austria) KTM	520
2	(Japan) Honda	283

Teams' Championship standings

Pos.	Team	Points
1	(Finland) Red Bull KTM Ajo	563
2	(Spain) Frinsa – MT Helmets – MSi	411
3	(Spain) CFMoto Gaviota Aspar Team	372
4	(Germany) Liqui Moly Dynavolt Intact GP	313
5	(Luxembourg) Leopard Racing	280

=== MotoE ===
Riders' Championship standings

	Pos.	Rider	Points
	1	(Italy) Alessandro Zaccone	198
	2	(Italy) Mattia Casadei	188
	3	(Italy) Matteo Ferrari	168
1	4	(Brazil) Eric Granado	162
1	5	(Italy) Nicholas Spinelli	159

Teams' Championship standings

	Pos.	Team	Points
	1	(Monaco) LCR E-Team	350
	2	(Germany) Dynavolt Intact GP	274
	3	(Italy) Aruba Cloud MotoE Team	254
1	4	(Spain) Power Electronics Aspar Team	226
1	5	(Italy) Felo Gresini MotoE	222

== Notes ==
Previous race: 2025 Malaysian Grand Prix	FIM Grand Prix World Championship; 2025 season	Next race: 2025 Valencian Grand Prix
Previous race: 2024 Portuguese Grand Prix	Portuguese motorcycle Grand Prix	Next race: 2026 Portuguese Grand Prix
