= Honda RC213V =

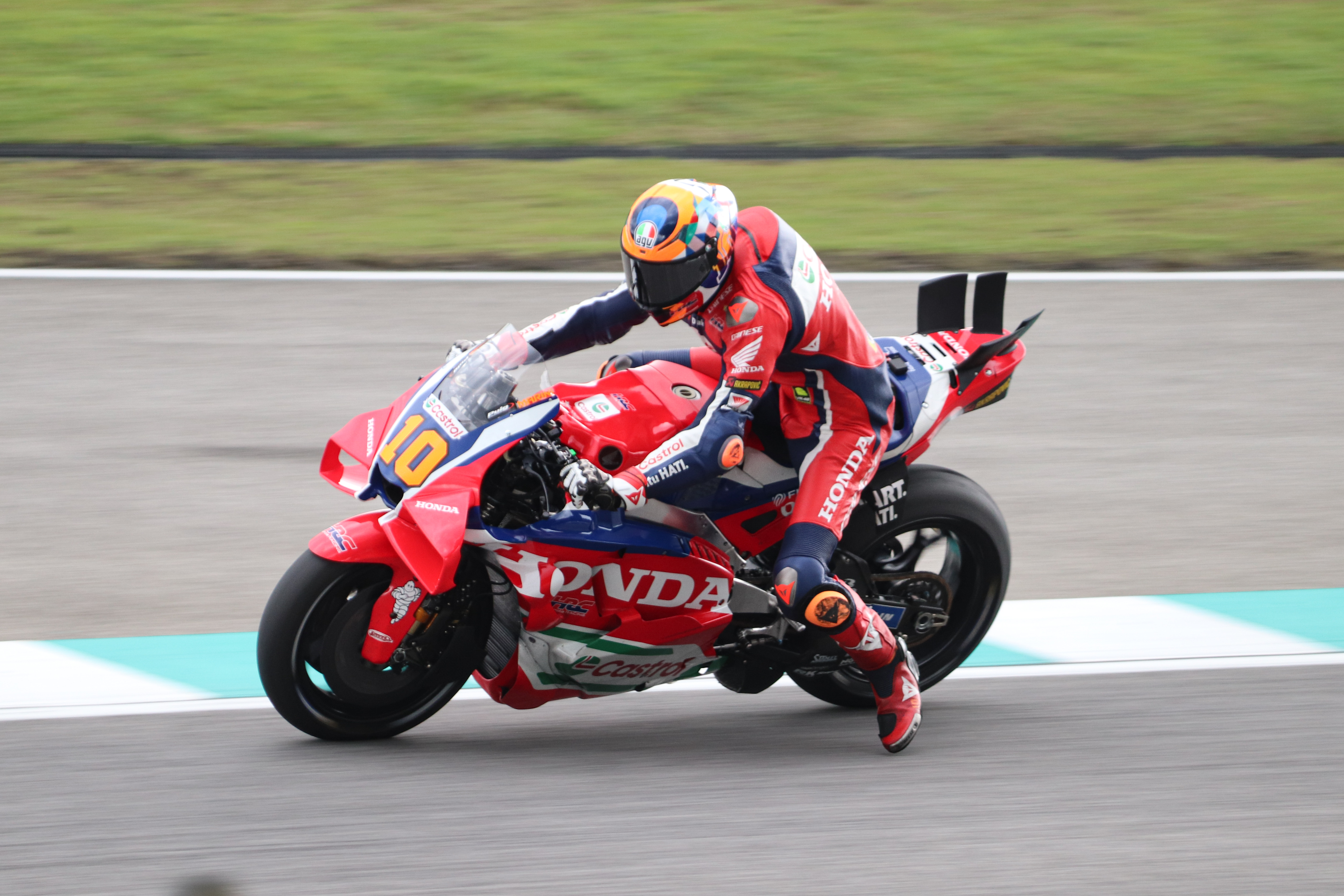
- Luca Marini riding the Honda RC213V at Sepang 2025
- Manufacturer: Honda Racing Corporation
- Production: 2012–present
- Predecessor: Honda RC212V
- Class: MotoGP prototype
- Engine: 1,000 cc (61 cu in) Liquid-cooled, Four-stroke, 90° V4, DOHC, 16-valves, four-valves per cylinder
- Wheelbase: 1,435 mm
- Dimensions: L: 2,052 mm W: 645 mm
- Seat height: 1,110 mm
- Weight: 160 kg (dry)
- Fuel capacity: 21L

The Honda RC213V is a Japanese motorcycle developed for road racing by Honda Racing Corporation to compete in the MotoGP series from the 2012 season and onwards. Rules for 2012 allowed motorcycles up to 1,000 cc (61 cu in) in capacity, with a limit of 4 cylinders and a maximum 81mm cylinder bore.

The model name designates the following:

- RC= Honda's traditional racing prefix for 4-stroke bikes
- 213= third works bike of the 21st century
- V= V engine

A limited-production run of a hand-built, road-going version designated RC213V-S was introduced in 2015 as a MotoGP replica. Honda merchandised a Sports Kit upgrade package to allow owners to improve the specification for non-road use.

== History ==
Compared to the RC212V, the most significant new design features of the RC213V were its 1000cc displacement and 90° cylinder angle.

The widening of the angle from 75.5° to 90° made it possible to increase the displacement to 1000cc without raising the center of gravity and gave the engine better primary balance. Because a balance shaft was no longer necessary, weight was saved.

Advances in electronics now made it possible to control handling without a reverse-rotating crank, and because the new forward-rotating crank didn't need an idle gear, more weight was saved.

The 90° angle gave Honda more options to experiment with firing order, and in 2012 Honda wanted a firing order that would maximize horsepower. The RC213V's original firing order was described as “screamer mode." Compared to the firing order of the RC213's immediate predecessors, it may have been, but the actual specifications were not revealed. The intervals may have been the 180°-270°-180°-90° near-screamer intervals of Honda's V4, 180°-crank, VFR, or perhaps the 90°-270°-90°-270° "droner" intervals of Honda's 360°-crank superbike racers, the RC30 and RC45.

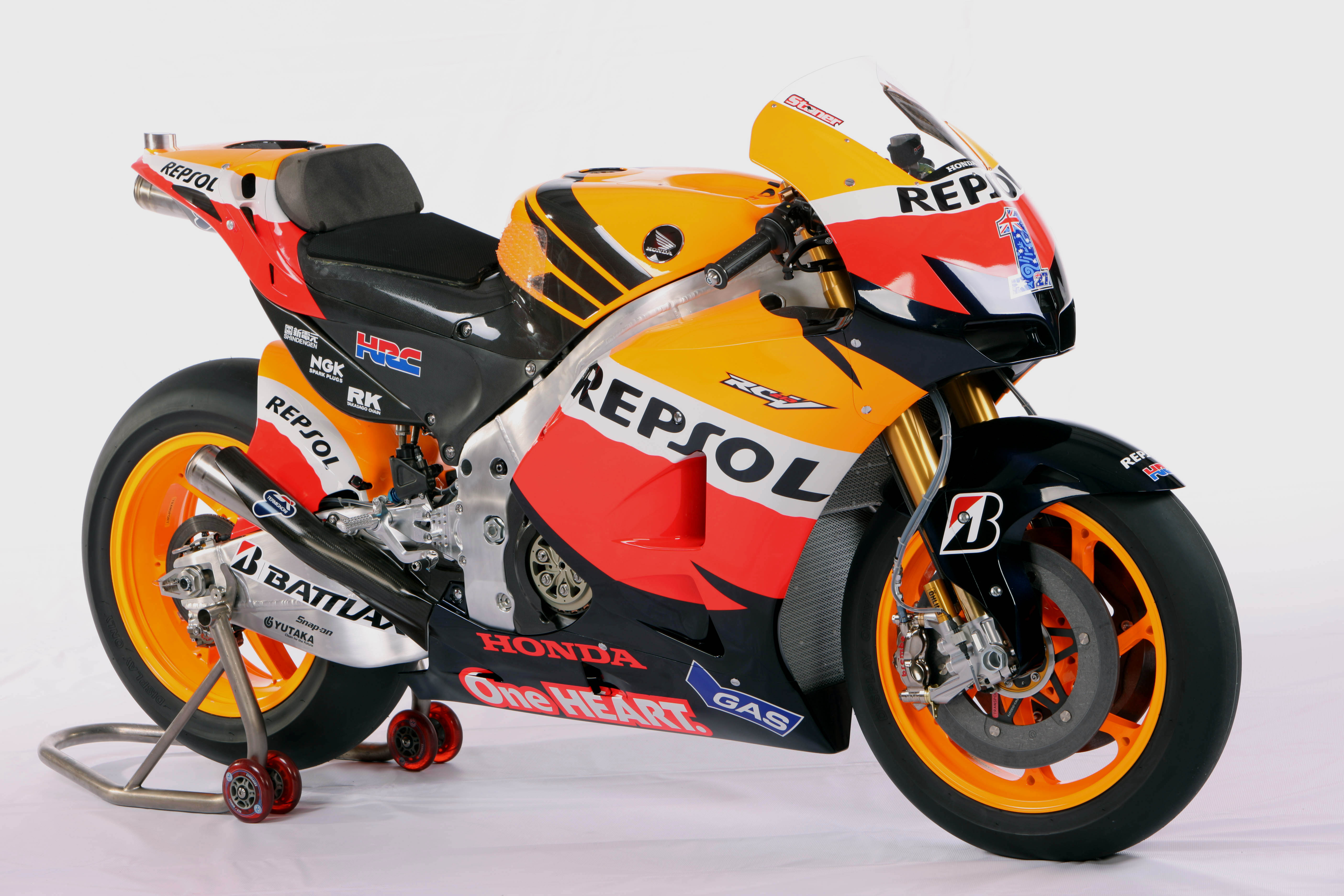
Casey Stoner's Honda RC213V in 2012

For the 2012 season, Honda fielded two factory RC213Vs, ridden by Repsol Honda teammates Casey Stoner and Dani Pedrosa; a third and fourth were used by Álvaro Bautista on the Gresini Racing team, and Stefan Bradl on the LCR Team. Jonathan Rea also competed in two Grands Prix as a replacement rider for Casey Stoner, following his crash at Indianapolis. At the first pre-season test in late 2011, Pedrosa and Stoner were at the top of the timesheets. From their combined efforts, with the Repsol riders winning 12 races of 18, and finishing 2nd and 3rd in the riders championship, the RC213V won its maiden constructors championship under the first year of 1000 cc regulations.

In 2013, the reigning Moto2 champion Marc Márquez replaced retired Casey Stoner on the Repsol Honda team, and won the riders championship on the RC213V. Dani Pedrosa came third in the riders' championship, and the RC213V won its second constructors' championship in its second year on track.

In 2014, at the first pre-season test at Sepang, the RC213V continued to top the time sheets, with its riders coming in 1st, 3rd, 5th, and 6th on the first day of the Sepang Test, and 1st, 2nd, 3rd and 9th on the second day.

After Yamaha won the constructors' championship in 2015, and the rules began to prohibit sophisticated electronics in 2016, Honda went back to a heavier, reverse-rotating crankshaft as the best way to improve handling, By 2019 all the constructors would reach the same conclusion. Honda also went back to a "big bang" firing order, something they knew a lot about. It was Honda who discovered in 1992 that a firing order with even intervals was not conducive to good traction. In 2017, specifications for the RC213V indicated a 180° crankshaft and “four simultaneous power strokes,” implying that the new firing intervals might have been 90°-90°-90°-450°, but the exact specifications were not revealed.

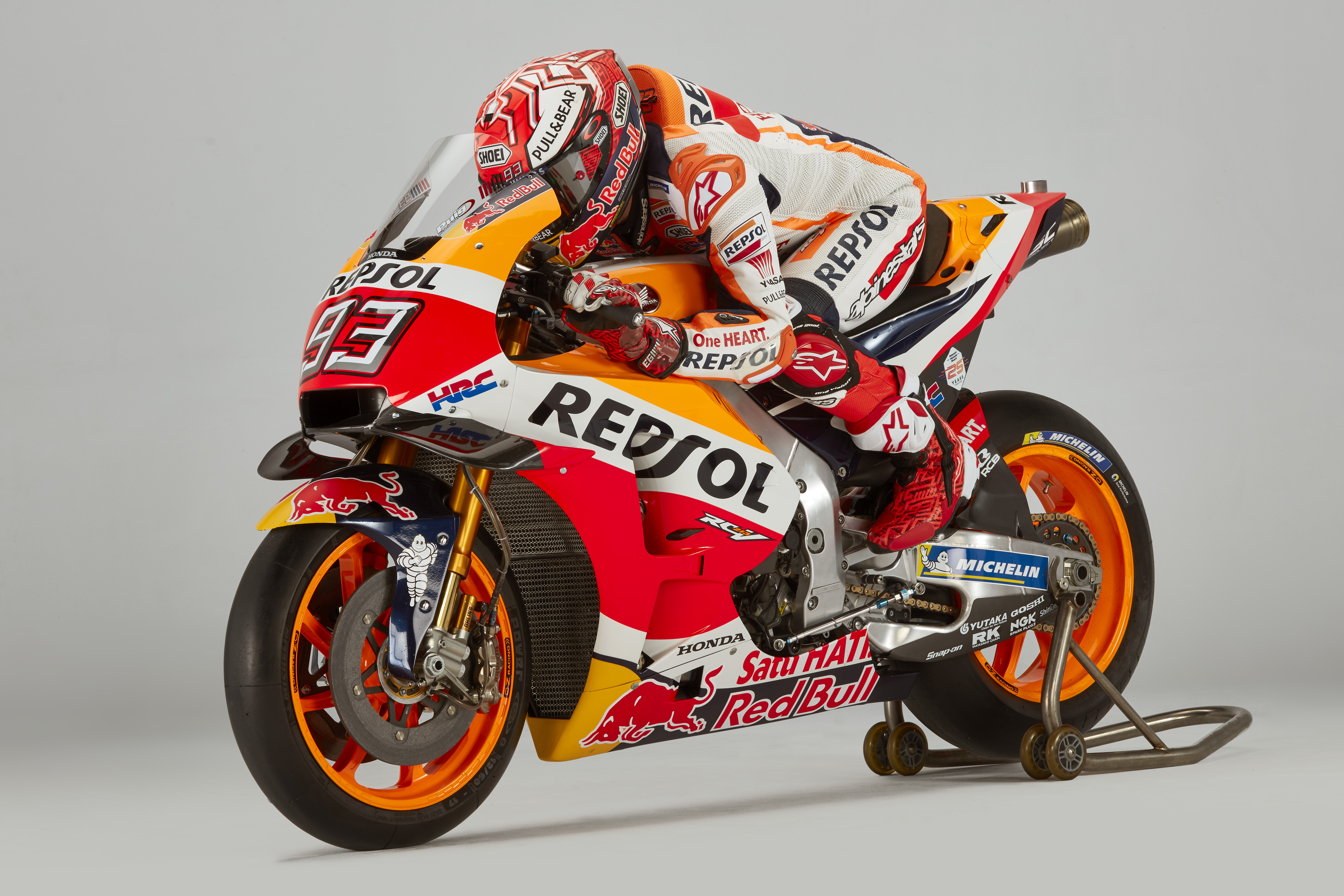
Marc Marquez's 2019 Honda RC213V

For the 2019 Grand Prix Season, three specifications of the RC213V were tested by Marquez and the newly signed rider, Jorge Lorenzo. The tests were conducted over two days at the Circuit Ricardo Tormo near Valencia, Spain. On the first day, the times were recorded as 1:31.718 for Marquez and 1:32.959 for Lorenzo. On the second day. they were 1:30.911 and 1:31.584, respectively. The chosen specifications were not revealed, but they must have been good ones, as Marquez and Honda won the 2019 riders' and constructors' championships.

Whatever Honda's changes were in the following three years, they were not for the better. After Honda won the constructors' championship in 2012, 2013, 2014, 2016, 2017, 2018, and 2019 with the RC213V, Ducati won in 2020, 2021, and 2022 with the Desmosedici. In those three years Honda could manage only 5th, 4th, and 6th in the constructors' standings.

When asked about the changes for 2022, project manager Takeo Yokoyama explained, “In the past two years, we had problems with the grip on the rear wheel...We decided to start from scratch with the engine. We built the new bike around the new engine." Yokoyama didn't reveal any details, but it appears the engine was tilted backwards. According to one report, everything but the V4 configuration and the firing order was changed. Nevertheless, Ducati continued to dominate, and Honda fell even farther behind. Marquez had several crashes and was sidelined for much of the season, though the crashes were not necessarily the fault of the RC213V. However, Honda's Pol Espargaro claimed that the 2022 variant had "no strong points," and test-rider Stefan Bradl claimed it had "unacceptable" heat problems.

== Production racers ==
Honda RC213V-RS
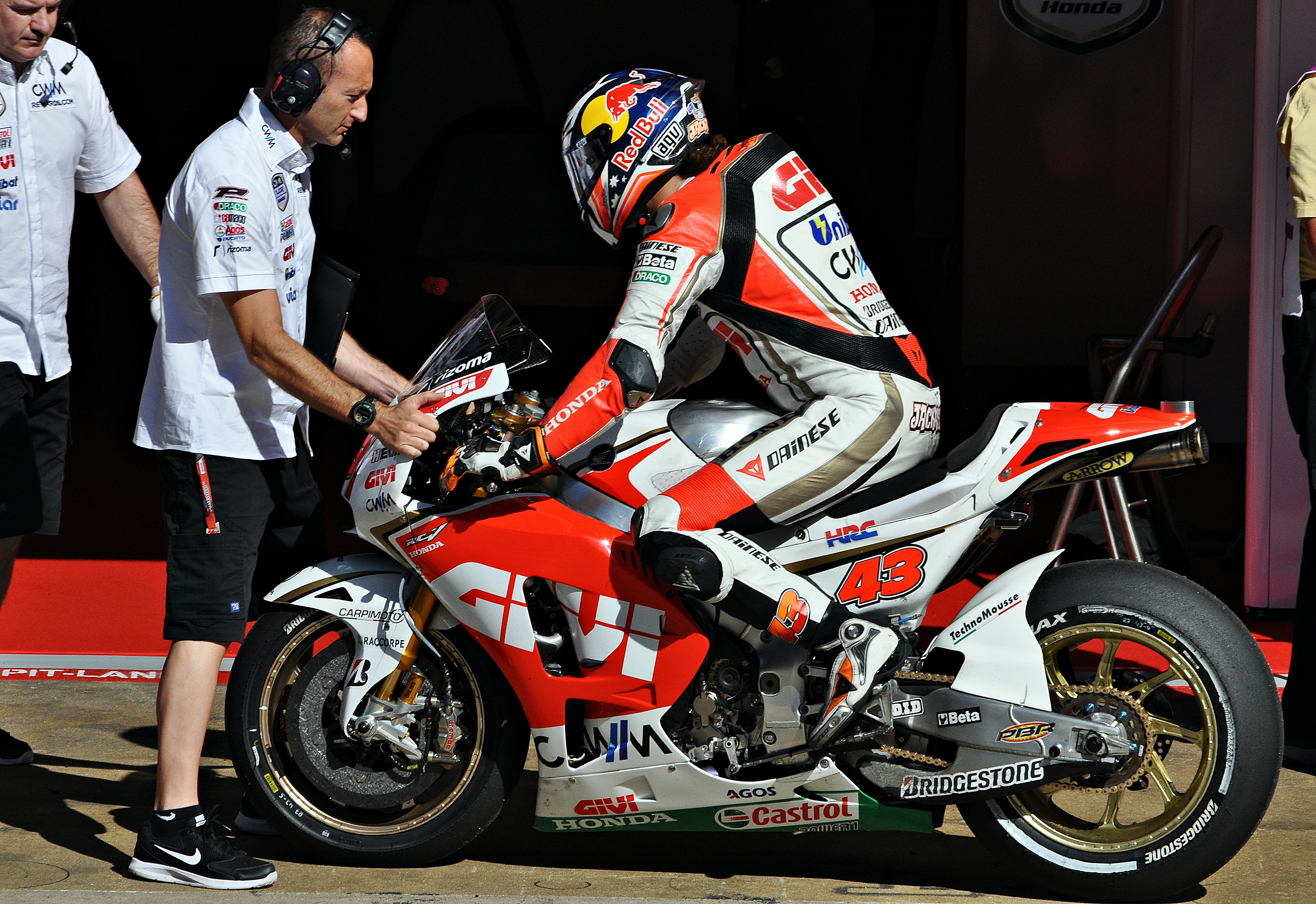
- Jack Miller on a Honda RC213V-RS
- Manufacturer: Honda Racing Corporation
- Production: 2014
- Predecessor: Honda RCV1000R
- Engine: 1,000 cc (61 cu in) four-stroke V4
- Related: Honda RC213V

=== RCV1000R ===
On 7 November 2013 HRC revealed the RCV1000R, a simplified "production racer" that non-MSMA teams Gresini Racing, AB Motoracing and the Aspar Team raced in 2014. The RCV1000R lacks the seamless shift gearbox and the pneumatic operated valves of the RC213V and uses the official Dorna-issued ECU software.

=== RC213V-RS ===
For 2015 the new RC213V-RS replaced the RCV1000R, adopting the pneumatic operated valves but still lacking the seamless shift gearbox.

== Specifications ==
	2012	2013	2014 – Present
Overall length	2,052 mm (80.8 in)		
Overall width	645 mm (25.4 in)		
Overall height	1,110 mm (43.7 in)		
Wheelbase	1,435 mm (56.5 in)		
Road Clearance	115 mm (4.5 in)		
Weight	157 kg (346 lb) as per FIM Regulations	160 kg (353 lb) as per FIM Regulations	
Engine Type	Liquid-cooled, Four-stroke, DOHC 4 Valve, V-4 90°		
Displacement	999 cc (61 cu in)		
Bore x stroke	81mm x 48.5mm		
Output	185 kW (280 PS)		
Top Speed	367.3 km/h – 228.23 mph		
Fuel Capacity	22 L (4.8 imp gal; 5.8 US gal)		20 L (4.4 imp gal; 5.3 US gal)
Frame Type	Aluminum Twin Spar		
Suspension	Front : Telescopic fork (Öhlins) Rear : Pro-Link (Öhlins)		
Brakes	Front : Carbon ceramic (Brembo) Rear : Steel disk (Yutaka)		

== RC213V-S ==
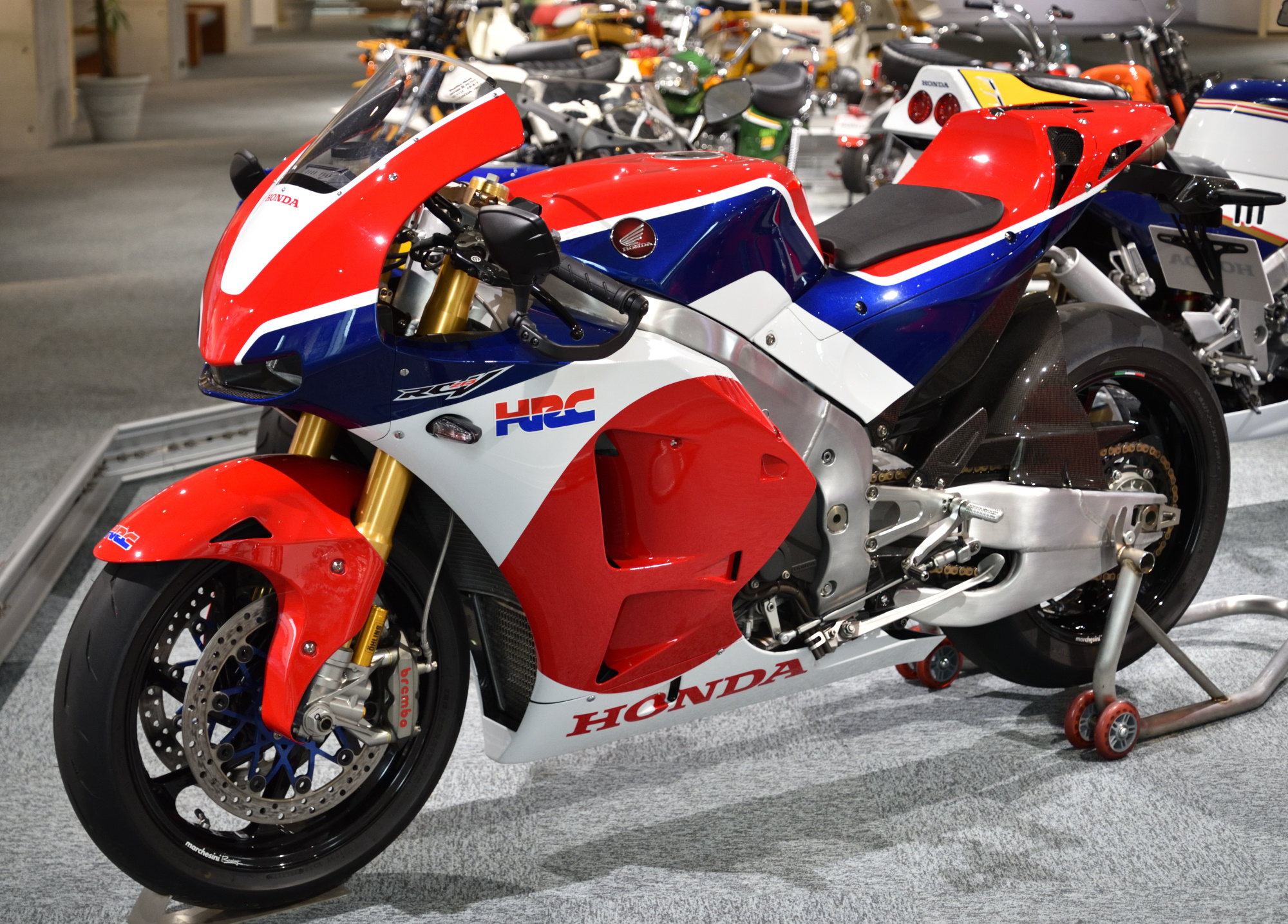
2015 RC213V-S

On 11 June 2015, Honda released the limited-run RC213V-S. The motorcycle is a street-legal MotoGP replica. Honda claims the motorcycle shares 80% of its parts with the MotoGP version. Differences include steel valve springs instead of pneumatic valves, stainless steel brakes instead of carbon brakes, 6-speed sequential manual instead of seamless shift, 17" Marchesini wheels instead of 16.5", and a larger steering angle. European models rev to 12,000rpm with an optional power kit increasing it to 14,000. US models are limited to 9,400rpm due to sound noise laws. The power kit is not available for US models.

Model	RC213V-S (2015–2018)	RC213V-S with Power Kit (2015–2018)
Length	2,100 mm (83 in)	
Width	790 mm (31 in)	770 mm (30 in)
Height	1,120 mm (44 in)	
Wheelbase	1,465 mm (57.7 in)	
Ground Clearance	120 mm (4.7 in)	
Seat Height	830 mm (33 in)	
Dry Weight	170 kg (370 lb)	160 kg (350 lb)
Turning Radius	3.7 m (12 ft)	6.4 m (21 ft)
Engine	Water-cooled 4-stroke DOHC 4-valve V4	
Displacement	999cc	
Bore and Stroke	81.0 × 48.5mm	
Compression Ratio	13.0	
Power	159ps/11,000rpm (Europe and Australia); 100ps/8,000rpm (USA and France); 70ps/6,000rpm (Japan)	215ps/13,000rpm
Torque	102 N⋅m (75 lb⋅ft)/10,500rpm (Europe); 90 N⋅m (66 lb⋅ft)/8,000rpm (USA and France); 87 N⋅m (64 lb⋅ft)/5,000rpm (Japan)	118 N⋅m (87 lb⋅ft)/10,500rpm
Fuel Supply	Electronic fuel injection	
Fuel capacity	16 L (4.2 US gal)	
Clutch	Dry multi-plate coil-spring	
Transmission	Constant mesh 6-speed sequential manual	

== Complete MotoGP results ==
=== Motorcycle summary ===
These results are accurate up to the 2025 French motorcycle Grand Prix.

- World Championship titles:

Constructors: 7 (2012, 2013, 2014, 2016, 2017, 2018, 2019)
Riders: 6 (Marc Márquez 2013, 2014, 2016, 2017, 2018, 2019)
Teams: 6 (Repsol Honda 2012, 2013, 2014, 2017, 2018, 2019)

- **Races won: 85**

2012: Pedrosa 7, Stoner 5 (12 in total)
2013: Márquez 6, Pedrosa 3 (9 in total)
2014: Márquez 13, Pedrosa 1 (14 in total)
2015: Márquez 5, Pedrosa 2 (7 in total)
2016: Márquez 5, Pedrosa 1, Crutchlow 2, Miller 1 (8 in total)
2017: Márquez 6, Pedrosa 2 (8 in total)
2018: Márquez 9, Crutchlow 1 (10 in total)
2019: Márquez 12 (12 in total)
2021: Márquez 3 (3 in total)
2023: Rins 1 (1 in total)
2025: Zarco 1 (1 in total)

- **Poles: 86**

2012: Pedrosa 5, Stoner 5, Bautista 1 (11 in total)
2013: Márquez 9, Pedrosa 2, Bradl 1 (12 in total)
2014: Márquez 13, Pedrosa 1 (14 in total)
2015: Márquez 8, Pedrosa 1 (9 in total)
2016: Márquez 6, Crutchlow 1 (7 in total)
2017: Márquez 8, Pedrosa 3 (11 in total)
2018: Márquez 7, Crutchlow 1 (8 in total)
2019: Márquez 10 (10 in total)
2020: Nakagami 1 (1 in total)
2021: Espargaró 1 (1 in total)
2022: Márquez 1 (1 in total)
2023: Márquez 1 (1 in total)

=== RC213V results ===
(key) (results in bold indicate pole position; results in italics indicate fastest lap)

Year	Team	Tyres	No.	Rider	Race																						Riders' standings		Teams' standings		Manufacturers' standings	
Year	Team	Tyres	No.	Rider	1	2	3	4	5	6	7	8	9	10	11	12	13	14	15	16	17	18	19	20	21	22	Pts	Pos	Pts	Pos	Pts	Pos
2012					QAT	ESP	POR	FRA	CAT	GBR	NED	GER	ITA	USA	IND	CZE	RSM	ARA	JPN	MAL	AUS	VAL										
2012	(Japan) Repsol Honda Team	B	1	(Australia) Casey Stoner	3	1	**1**	3	**4**	2	**1**	**Ret**	8	1	4				5	3	**1**	3					254	3rd	603	1st	412	1st
2012	(Japan) Repsol Honda Team	B	26	(Spain) Dani Pedrosa	2	3	3	**4**	2	3	2	1	**2**	3	**1**	1	Ret	1	1	1	Ret	**1**					332	2nd	603	1st	412	1st
2012	(Japan) Repsol Honda Team	B	56	(United Kingdom) Jonathan Rea													8	7									17	21st	603	1st	412	1st
2012	(Monaco) LCR Honda MotoGP	B	6	(Germany) Stefan Bradl	8	7	9	5	8	8	Ret	5	4	7	6	5	6	Ret	6	Ret	6	Ret					135	8th	135	7th	412	1st
2012	(Italy) San Carlo Honda Gresini	B	19	(Spain) Álvaro Bautista	7	6	6	10	6	**4**	Ret	7	10	8	5	6	3	6	3	6	5	4					178	5th	221	5th	412	1st
2013					QAT	AME	ESP	FRA	ITA	CAT	NED	GER	USA	IND	CZE	GBR	RSM	ARA	MAL	AUS	JPN	VAL										
2013	(Monaco) LCR Honda MotoGP	B	6	(Germany) Stefan Bradl	Ret	5	Ret	10	4	5	6	4	**2**	7	6	6	5	5	DNS	DNS	5	6					156	7th	156	6th	389	1st
2013	(Italy) Go&Fun Honda Gresini	B	19	(Spain) Álvaro Bautista	6	8	6	6	Ret	Ret	7	5	4	6	5	5	7	4	5	5	4	5					171	6th	173	5th	389	1st
2013	(Japan) Repsol Honda Team	B	26	(Spain) Dani Pedrosa	4	2	1	1	**2**	**2**	4	DNS	5	2	2	3	3	Ret	1	2	3	2					300	3rd	634	1st	389	1st
2013	(Japan) Repsol Honda Team	B	93	(Spain) Marc Márquez	3	**1**	2	**3**	Ret	3	2	**1**	**1**	**1**	**1**	2	2	**1**	**2**	DSQ	**2**	**3**					334	1st	634	1st	389	1st
2014					QAT	AME	ARG	ESP	FRA	ITA	CAT	NED	GER	IND	CZE	GBR	RSM	ARA	JPN	AUS	MAL	VAL										
2014	(Monaco) LCR Honda MotoGP	B	6	(Germany) Stefan Bradl	Ret	4	5	10	7	Ret	5	10	16	Ret	7	7	Ret	4	7	Ret	4	8					117	9th	117	8th	409	1st
2014	(Italy) Go&Fun Honda Gresini	B	19	(Spain) Álvaro Bautista	Ret	Ret	Ret	6	3	8	Ret	7	9	Ret	10	Ret	8	7	10	6	Ret	16					89	11th	89 (170)	5th	409	1st
2014	(Japan) Repsol Honda Team	B	26	(Spain) Dani Pedrosa	3	2	2	3	5	4	**3**	3	2	4	1	4	3	14	4	Ret	Ret	3					246	4th	608	1st	409	1st
2014	(Japan) Repsol Honda Team	B	93	(Spain) Marc Márquez	**1**	**1**	**1**	**1**	**1**	**1**	1	1	**1**	**1**	**4**	**1**	15	**13**	2	**Ret**	**1**	1					362	1st	608	1st	409	1st
2015					QAT	AME	ARG	ESP	FRA	ITA	CAT	NED	GER	IND	CZE	GBR	RSM	ARA	JPN	AUS	MAL	VAL										
2015	(Japan) Repsol Honda Team	B	7	(Japan) Hiroshi Aoyama		11	Ret	Ret																			5	25th	453	2nd	355	2nd
2015	(Japan) Repsol Honda Team	B	26	(Spain) Dani Pedrosa	6				16	4	3	8	2	4	5	5	9	2	1	5	**1**	3					206	4th	453	2nd	355	2nd
2015	(Japan) Repsol Honda Team	B	93	(Spain) Marc Márquez	5	**1**	**Ret**	2	**4**	Ret	Ret	2	**1**	**1**	2	**Ret**	1	**Ret**	4	**1**	Ret	2					242	3rd	453	2nd	355	2nd
2015	(Monaco) CWM LCR Honda (Monaco) LCR Honda	B	35	(United Kingdom) Cal Crutchlow	7	7	3	4	Ret	Ret	Ret	6	7	8	Ret	Ret	11	7	6	7	5	9					125	8th	125 (142)	7th	355	2nd
2015	(Belgium) EG 0,0 Marc VDS	B	45	(United Kingdom) Scott Redding	13	Ret	9	13	Ret	11	7	13	Ret	13	12	6	3	12	10	11	11	15					84	13th	84	8th	355	2nd
2015	(Japan) Team HRC with Nissin	B	72	(Japan) Takumi Takahashi															12								4	26th	4	–	355	2nd
2016					QAT	ARG	AME	ESP	FRA	ITA	CAT	NED	GER	AUT	CZE	GBR	RSM	ARA	JPN	AUS	MAL	VAL										
2016	(Japan) Repsol Honda Team	M	7	(Japan) Hiroshi Aoyama																	16						1	25th	454	2nd	369	1st
2016	(Japan) Repsol Honda Team	M	73	(Japan) Hiroshi Aoyama															15								1	25th	454	2nd	369	1st
2016	(Japan) Repsol Honda Team	M	26	(Spain) Dani Pedrosa	5	3	Ret	4	4	4	3	12	6	7	12	5	1	6	DNS			Ret					155	6th	454	2nd	369	1st
2016	(Japan) Repsol Honda Team	M	69	(United States) Nicky Hayden																17							0 (1) (Note: Non-bracketed number refers to the number accumulated with the team, with number in brackets referring to the total accumulated for the season.)	26th	454	2nd	369	1st
2016	(Japan) Repsol Honda Team	M	93	(Spain) Marc Márquez	3	**1**	**1**	3	13	2	**2**	2	**1**	5	**3**	4	4	**1**	1	**Ret**	11	2					298	1st	454	2nd	369	1st
2016	(Monaco) LCR Honda	M	35	(United Kingdom) Cal Crutchlow	Ret	Ret	16	11	Ret	11	6	Ret	2	15	1	**2**	8	5	5	1	Ret	Ret					141	7th	141	8th	369	1st
2016	(Belgium) Estrella Galicia 0,0 Marc VDS	M	43	(Australia) Jack Miller	14	Ret	DNS	17	Ret	Ret	10	1	7	DNS		16	DNS		Ret	10	8	15					57	18th	87	11th	369	1st
2016	(Belgium) Estrella Galicia 0,0 Marc VDS	M	53	(Spain) Tito Rabat	15	9	13	18	Ret	DNS	14	11	16	14	10	15	17	Ret	14	16	18	17					29	21st	87	11th	369	1st
2016	(Belgium) Estrella Galicia 0,0 Marc VDS	M	69	(United States) Nicky Hayden														15									1 (1)	26th	87	11th	369	1st
2017					QAT	ARG	AME	ESP	FRA	ITA	CAT	NED	GER	CZE	AUT	GBR	RSM	ARA	JPN	AUS	MAL	VAL										
2017	(Belgium) EG 0,0 Marc VDS	M	7	(Japan) Hiroshi Aoyama															18								0	–	117	7th	357	1st
2017	(Belgium) EG 0,0 Marc VDS	M	43	(Australia) Jack Miller	8	9	10	Ret	8	15	Ret	6	15	14	Ret	16	6	13		7	8	7					82	11th	117	7th	357	1st
2017	(Belgium) EG 0,0 Marc VDS	M	53	(Spain) Tito Rabat	15	12	13	Ret	11	11	15	12	18	17	19	12	Ret	15	15	16	18	10					35	19th	117	7th	357	1st
2017	(Japan) Repsol Honda Team	M	26	(Spain) Dani Pedrosa	5	Ret	3	**1**	3	Ret	**3**	13	3	2	3	7	14	2	Ret	12	**5**	1					210	4th	508	1st	357	1st
2017	(Japan) Repsol Honda Team	M	93	(Spain) Marc Márquez	4	**Ret**	**1**	2	Ret	6	2	3	**1**	**1**	**2**	**Ret**	1	1	2	**1**	4	**3**					298	1st	508	1st	357	1st
2017	(Monaco) LCR Honda	M	35	(United Kingdom) Cal Crutchlow	Ret	3	4	Ret	5	Ret	11	4	10	5	15	4	13	Ret	Ret	5	15	8					112	9th	112	8th	357	1st
2018					QAT	ARG	AME	SPA	FRA	ITA	CAT	NED	GER	CZE	AUT	GBR	RSM	ARA	THA	JPN	AUS	MAL	VAL									
2018	(Japan) HRC Honda Team	M	6	(Germany) Stefan Bradl										Ret			Ret										0 (10)	24th	0	–	375	1st
2018	(Japan) Repsol Honda Team	M	26	(Spain) Dani Pedrosa	7	Ret	7	Ret	5	Ret	5	15	8	8	7	C	6	5	Ret	8	Ret	5	5				117	11th	438	1st	375	1st
2018	(Japan) Repsol Honda Team	M	93	(Spain) Marc Márquez	2	18	**1**	1	1	16	2	**1**	**1**	3	**2**	C	2	1	**1**	1	**Ret**	**1**	Ret				321	1st	438	1st	375	1st
2018	(Monaco) LCR Honda Idemitsu	M	30	(Japan) Takaaki Nakagami	17	13	14	12	15	18	Ret	19	Ret	17	15	C	13	12	22	15	14	14	6				33	20th	191	7th	375	1st
2018	(Monaco) LCR Honda Castrol	M	6	(Germany) Stefan Bradl																		13	9				10 (10)	24th	191	7th	375	1st
2018	(Monaco) LCR Honda Castrol	M	35	(United Kingdom) Cal Crutchlow	4	1	19	**Ret**	8	6	4	6	Ret	5	4	C	3	Ret	7	2	DNS						148	7th	191	7th	375	1st
2018	(Belgium) EG 0,0 Marc VDS	M	6	(Germany) Stefan Bradl									16														0 (10)	24th	50	11th	375	1st
2018	(Belgium) EG 0,0 Marc VDS	M	12	(Switzerland) Thomas Lüthi	16	17	18	Ret	16	Ret	Ret	20	17	16	22	C	22	17	20	20	16	16	Ret				0	29th	50	11th	375	1st
2018	(Belgium) EG 0,0 Marc VDS	M	21	(Italy) Franco Morbidelli	12	14	21	9	13	15	14	DNS		13	19	C	12	11	14	11	8	12	Ret				50	15th	50	11th	375	1st
2019					QAT	ARG	AME	SPA	FRA	ITA	CAT	NED	GER	CZE	AUT	GBR	RSM	ARA	THA	JPN	AUS	MAL	VAL									
2019	(Japan) Team HRC	M	6	(Germany) Stefan Bradl				10																			16	21st	6	–	426	1st
2019	(Japan) Repsol Honda Team	M	6	(Germany) Stefan Bradl									10	15	13												16	21st	458	1st	426	1st
2019	(Japan) Repsol Honda Team	M	93	(Spain) Marc Márquez	2	**1**	**Ret**	1	**1**	**2**	1	2	**1**	**1**	**2**	**2**	1	**1**	1	**1**	1	2	1				420	1st	458	1st	426	1st
2019	(Japan) Repsol Honda Team	M	99	(Spain) Jorge Lorenzo	13	12	Ret	12	11	13	Ret	DNS				14	14	20	18	17	16	14	13				28	19th	458	1st	426	1st
2019	(Monaco) LCR Honda Idemitsu	M	5	(France) Johann Zarco																	13	Ret	Ret				3 (30)	18th	210	7th	426	1st
2019	(Monaco) LCR Honda Idemitsu	M	30	(Japan) Takaaki Nakagami	9	7	10	9	Ret	5	8	Ret	14	9	11	17	18	10	10	16							74	13th	210	7th	426	1st
2019	(Monaco) LCR Honda Castrol	M	35	(United Kingdom) Cal Crutchlow	3	13	Ret	8	9	8	Ret	7	3	5	Ret	6	Ret	6	12	5	2	Ret	Ret				133	9th	210	7th	426	1st
2020					SPA	ANC	CZE	AUT	STY	RSM	EMI	CAT	FRA	ARA	TER	EUR	VAL	POR														
2020	(Japan) Repsol Honda Team	M	6	(Germany) Stefan Bradl			18	17	18	18	DNS	17	8	17	12	12	14	7									27	19th	101	9th	144	5th
2020	(Japan) Repsol Honda Team	M	73	(Spain) Álex Márquez	12	8	15	14	16	17	7	13	2	2	Ret	Ret	16	9									74	14th	101	9th	144	5th
2020	(Japan) Repsol Honda Team	M	93	(Spain) Marc Márquez	Ret	DNS																					0	NC	101	9th	144	5th
2020	(Monaco) LCR Honda Idemitsu	M	30	(Japan) Takaaki Nakagami	10	4	8	6	7	9	6	7	7	5	**Ret**	4	Ret	5									116	10th	148	8th	144	5th
2020	(Monaco) LCR Honda Castrol	M	35	(United Kingdom) Cal Crutchlow	DNS	13	13	15	17	DNS		10	Ret	8	11	Ret	13	13									32	18th	148	8th	144	5th
2021					QAT	DOH	POR	SPA	FRA	ITA	CAT	GER	NED	STY	AUT	GBR	ARA	RSM	AME	EMI	ALR	VAL										
2021	(Japan) Repsol Honda Team	M	44	(Spain) Pol Espargaró	9	13	Ret	10	8	12	Ret	10	10	16	16	**5**	13	7	10	2	6	DNS					100	10th	250	5th	214	4th
2021	(Japan) Repsol Honda Team	M	93	(Spain) Marc Márquez			7	9	Ret	Ret	Ret	1	7	8	15	Ret	2	4	1	1							142	7th	250	5th	214	4th
2021	(Japan) Repsol Honda Team	M	6	(Germany) Stefan Bradl	11	14															15						8 (14)	22nd	250	5th	214	4th
2021	(Japan) Honda HRC (Japan) Team Honda HRC	M	6	(Germany) Stefan Bradl				12										14									6 (14)	22nd	—N/a		214	4th
2021	(Monaco) LCR Honda Idemitsu	M	30	(Japan) Takaaki Nakagami	Ret	17	10	4	7	Ret	13	13	9	5	13	13	10	10	17	15	11	Ret					76	15th	146	7th	214	4th
2021	(Monaco) LCR Honda Castrol	M	73	(Spain) Álex Márquez	Ret	Ret	8	Ret	6	14	11	Ret	14	9	9	8	Ret	15	12	Ret	4	13					70	16th	146	7th	214	4th
2022					QAT	INA	ARG	AME	POR	SPA	FRA	ITA	CAT	GER	NED	GBR	AUT	RSM	ARA	JPN	THA	AUS	MAL	VAL								
2022	(Japan) Repsol Honda Team	M	44	(Spain) Pol Espargaró	3	12	Ret	13	9	11	11	Ret	17	Ret	DNS	14	16	Ret	15	12	14	11	14	Ret			56	16th	171	9th	155	6th
2022	(Japan) Repsol Honda Team	M	93	(Spain) Marc Márquez	5	DNS		6	6	4	6	10							Ret	**4**	5	2	7	Ret			113	13th	171	9th	155	6th
2022	(Japan) Repsol Honda Team	M	6	(Germany) Stefan Bradl										Ret	16	18	19	17	14								2 (2)	26th	171	9th	155	6th
2022	(Japan) Team HRC (Japan) HRC Team	M	6	(Germany) Stefan Bradl						19																	0 (2)	26th	—N/a		155	6th
2022	(Japan) Team HRC (Japan) HRC Team	M	45	(Japan) Tetsuta Nagashima																Ret							0 (0)	29th	—N/a		155	6th
2022	(Monaco) LCR Honda Idemitsu	M	45	(Japan) Tetsuta Nagashima																	22	19	Ret				0 (0)	29th	98	10th	155	6th
2022	(Monaco) LCR Honda Idemitsu	M	30	(Japan) Takaaki Nakagami	10	19	12	14	16	7	7	8	Ret	Ret	12	13	Ret	15	Ret	20				14			48	18th	98	10th	155	6th
2022	(Monaco) LCR Honda Castrol	M	73	(Spain) Álex Márquez	Ret	13	15	Ret	7	13	14	14	10	Ret	15	17	14	10	12	13	8	Ret	17	17			50	17th	98	10th	155	6th
2023					POR	ARG	AME	SPA	FRA	ITA	GER	NED	GBR	AUT	CAT	RSM	IND	JPN	INA	AUS	THA	MAL	QAT	VAL								
2023	(Japan) Repsol Honda Team	M	27	(Spain) Iker Lecuona				16				Ret															0	30th	122	9th	185	5th
2023	(Japan) Repsol Honda Team	M	36	(Spain) Joan Mir	11	DNS	Ret	Ret	Ret	DNS			Ret	Ret	17	Ret	5	12	Ret	Ret	12	Ret	14	DNS			26	22nd	122	9th	185	5th
2023	(Japan) Repsol Honda Team	M	93	(Spain) Marc Márquez	**Ret**^{3}				Ret^{5}	Ret^{7}	DNS	DNS	Ret	12	13	7	9^{3}	3^{7}	Ret	15	6^{4}	13	11	Ret^{3}			96	14th	122	9th	185	5th
2023	(Japan) Repsol Honda Team	M	6	(Germany) Stefan Bradl			Ret																				0 (8)	26th	122	9th	185	5th
2023	(Japan) HRC Team	M	6	(Germany) Stefan Bradl				14								18											2 (8)	26th	—N/a		185	5th
2023	(Monaco) LCR Honda Castrol	M	6	(Germany) Stefan Bradl								13					15	14									6 (8)	26th	116	10th	185	5th
2023	(Monaco) LCR Honda Castrol	M	7	(Japan) Takumi Takahashi												DNQ											0	NC	116	10th	185	5th
2023	(Monaco) LCR Honda Castrol	M	27	(Spain) Iker Lecuona									17	20	16												0	29th	116	10th	185	5th
2023	(Monaco) LCR Honda Castrol	M	42	(Spain) Álex Rins	12	12	1^{2}	Ret	Ret	DNS								WD	9	DNS				Ret			54	17th	116	10th	185	5th
2023	(Monaco) LCR Honda Idemitsu	M	30	(Japan) Takaaki Nakagami	12	13	Ret	9	9	13	14	8	16	18	15	19	11	11	11	19	14	18	19	12			56	18th	116	10th	185	5th
2024					QAT	POR	AME	SPA	FRA	CAT	ITA	NED	GER	GBR	AUT	ARA	RSM	EMI	INA	JPN	AUS	THA	MAL	SLD								
2024	(Japan) Repsol Honda Team	M	10	(Italy) Luca Marini	20	17	16	17	16	17	20	17	15	17	Ret	17	DNS	12	Ret	14	14	12	15	16			14	22nd	35	11th	75	5th
2024	(Japan) Repsol Honda Team	M	36	(Spain) Joan Mir	13	12	Ret	12^{9}	Ret	15	Ret	Ret	18	Ret	17	14	WD	11	Ret	Ret	Ret	15	Ret	Ret			21	21st	35	11th	75	5th
2024	(Japan) HRC Test Team	M	6	(Germany) Stefan Bradl				16		19			20		22		14							22			2	25th	—N/a		75	5th
2024	(Monaco) Castrol Honda LCR	M	5	(France) Johann Zarco	12	15	Ret	Ret	12	16	19	13	17	14	21	14	12	15	9^{8}	11	12	8	11	14			55	17th	86	10th	75	5th
2024	(Monaco) Idemitsu Honda LCR	M	30	(Japan) Takaaki Nakagami	19	14	Ret	14	14	14	Ret	16	14	15	14	12	13	17	12	13	18	13	Ret	17			31	19th	86	10th	75	5th
2025					THA	ARG	AME	QAT	SPA	FRA	GBR	ARA	ITA	NED	GER	CZE	AUT	HUN	CAT	RSM	JPN	INA	AUS	MAL	POR	VAL						
2025	(Japan) Honda HRC Castrol	M	10	(Italy) Luca Marini	12	10	8^{8}	10	10	11	15				6	12	13	5^{4}	8^{8}	7^{7}	Ret^{7}	5	6^{8}	8	11	7	142	13th	238	8th	285	4th
2025	(Japan) Honda HRC Castrol	M	36	(Spain) Joan Mir	Ret^{9}	9^{8}	Ret	Ret	Ret^{9}	Ret^{9}	10	7	11	Ret	Ret	Ret	6	Ret^{6}	12	Ret	3^{4}	Ret^{5}	Ret	3	Ret	13	96	15th	238	8th	285	4th
2025	(Japan) Honda HRC Castrol	M	30	(Japan) Takaaki Nakagami									16														10 (10)	23rd	238	8th	285	4th
2025	(Japan) Honda HRC Castrol	M	41	(Spain) Aleix Espargaró										16													0	28th	238	8th	285	4th
2025	(Japan) Honda HRC Test Team	M	41	(Spain) Aleix Espargaró					17		Ret								17							Ret	0	28th	—N/a		285	4th
2025	(Japan) Honda HRC Test Team	M	30	(Japan) Takaaki Nakagami						6											Ret						10 (10)	23rd	—N/a		285	4th
2025	(Monaco) Idemitsu Honda LCR	M	30	(Japan) Takaaki Nakagami												DNS											10 (10)	23rd	155	10th	285	4th
2025	(Monaco) Idemitsu Honda LCR	M	35	(Thailand) Somkiat Chantra	18	18	16	18	Ret		19	16	18	15					16	15	15	13	17	15	17	17	7	26th	155	10th	285	4th
2025	(Monaco) Castrol Honda LCR	M	5	(France) Johann Zarco	7	6^{4}	17	4	11	1^{6}	2^{5}	Ret	Ret	12	Ret^{7}	13^{8}	12^{9}	Ret	Ret^{7}	16	9	12	Ret	12^{8}	9^{7}	12	148	12th	155	10th	285	4th
2026					THA	BRA	USA	SPA	FRA	CAT	ITA	HUN	CZE	NED	GER	GBR	ARA	RSM	AUT	JPN	INA	AUS	MAL	QAT	POR	VAL						
2026	(Japan) Honda HRC Castrol	M	10	(Italy) Luca Marini	10	11	9^{5}	13^{9}	10	6	13	5	8	10	8	9	14	9^{9}	14	10	12	C	7	DNS			117*	13th*	158*	8th*	190*	4th*
2026	(Japan) Honda HRC Castrol	M	36	(Spain) Joan Mir	Ret^{7}	Ret	Ret	15	Ret^{6}	13	12	Ret	5	Ret	Ret	Ret^{7}	12	Ret					Ret				33*	18th*	158*	8th*	190*	4th*
2026	(Japan) Honda HRC Castrol	M	30	(Japan) Takaaki Nakagami															13								3*	27th*	158*	8th*	190*	4th*
2026	(Japan) Honda HRC Castrol	M	15	(Thailand) Somkiat Chantra																13							3*	26th*	158*	8th*	190*	4th*
2026	(Japan) Honda HRC Castrol	M	41	(Spain) Aleix Espargaró																	DNS						0*	33rd*	158*	8th*	190*	4th*
2026	(Japan) Honda HRC Castrol	M	96	(United Kingdom) Jake Dixon																				14			2*	28th*	158*	8th*	190*	4th*
2026	(Monaco) Pro Honda LCR	M	11	(Brazil) Diogo Moreira	13	13	13	17	Ret^{9}	9	10	6^{7}	11	14	11	10	9^{7}	Ret	15	Ret^{2}	16	C^{8}	Ret^{8}	Ret			78*	15th*	141*	9th*	190*	4th*
2026	(Monaco) Castrol Honda LCR	M	5	(France) Johann Zarco	11	9	Ret^{9}	7^{8}	11	Ret^{5}							15^{9}	Ret	10^{7}	20^{7}	13	C	Ret	9**^{5}**			63*	17th*	141*	9th*	190*	4th*
2026	(Monaco) Castrol Honda LCR	M	35	(United Kingdom) Cal Crutchlow							Ret	16	17	16	Ret	Ret											0*	29th*	141*	9th*	190*	4th*

=== RCV1000R results ===
(key)

Year	Team	Tyres	No.	Rider	Race																		Rider's standings	
Year	Team	Tyres	No.	Rider	1	2	3	4	5	6	7	8	9	10	11	12	13	14	15	16	17	18	Pts	Pos
2014					QAT	AME	ARG	ESP	FRA	ITA	CAT	NED	GER	IND	CZE	GBR	RSM	ARA	JPN	AUS	MAL	VAL		
2014	(Spain) Drive M7 Aspar	**B**	2	(United Kingdom) Leon Camier										Ret	15	16	16						1	27th
2014	(Spain) Drive M7 Aspar	**B**	7	(Japan) Hiroshi Aoyama	11	12	10	12	14	14	15	16	12	10	13	14	12	8	13	8	11		67 (68) (Note: Non-bracketed number refers to the number accumulated with the motorcycle, with number in brackets referring to the total accumulated for the season.)	14th
2014	(Spain) Drive M7 Aspar	**B**	69	(United States) Nicky Hayden	8	11	11	11	Ret	DNS	12	17	14					9	14	10	Ret	13	47	16th
2014	(Czech Republic) Cardion AB Motoracing	**B**	17	(Czech Republic) Karel Abraham	13	14	13	Ret	15	12	Ret	14	13	11	14	13	11	Ret	Ret	Ret	Ret	17	33	17th
2014	(Italy) GO&FUN Honda Gresini	**B**	45	(United Kingdom) Scott Redding	7	Ret	14	13	12	13	13	12	11	9	11	10	13	10	16	7	10	10	81	12

=== RC213V-RS results ===
(key)

Year	Team	Tyres	No.	Rider	Race																		Rider's standings	
Year	Team	Tyres	No.	Rider	1	2	3	4	5	6	7	8	9	10	11	12	13	14	15	16	17	18	Pts	Pos
2014					QAT	AME	ARG	ESP	FRA	ITA	CAT	NED	GER	IND	CZE	GBR	RSM	ARA	JPN	AUS	MAL	VAL		
2014	(Spain) Drive M7 Aspar	B	7	(Japan) Hiroshi Aoyama																		15	1 (68)	14th
2015					QAT	AME	ARG	ESP	FRA	ITA	CAT	NED	GER	IND	CZE	GBR	RSM	ARA	JPN	AUS	MAL	VAL		
2015	(Czech Republic) Cardion AB Motoracing	B	7	(Japan) Hiroshi Aoyama									Ret										0 (5)	25th
2015	(Czech Republic) Cardion AB Motoracing	B	13	(Australia) Anthony West																23	20	22	0	NC
2015	(Czech Republic) Cardion AB Motoracing	B	17	(Czech Republic) Karel Abraham	Ret	Ret	21	Ret	Ret	17	DNS				21	19	21	Ret					0	NC
2015	(Czech Republic) Cardion AB Motoracing	B	24	(Spain) Toni Elías										22									0 (2)	27th
2015	(Czech Republic) Cardion AB Motoracing	B	64	(Japan) Kousuke Akiyoshi															19				0	NC
2015	(Monaco) CWM LCR Honda (Monaco) LCR Honda	B	43	(Australia) Jack Miller	Ret	14	12	20	Ret	Ret	11	Ret	15	Ret	19	Ret	12	19	Ret	15	17	21	17	19th
2015	(Spain) Aspar MotoGP Team	B	50	(Republic of Ireland) Eugene Laverty	18	16	17	18	14	15	12	Ret	17	19	Ret	17	19	14	17	19	19	Ret	9	22nd
2015	(Spain) Aspar MotoGP Team	B	69	(United States) Nicky Hayden	17	13	16	17	11	Ret	Ret	16	16	16	17	12	17	15	13	Ret	16	17	16	20th

== See also ==
- KTM RC16
- Aprilia RS-GP
- Suzuki GSX-RR
- Yamaha YZR-M1
- Ducati Desmosedici
