= 2016 MotoGP World Championship =

68th running of the MotoGP World Championship

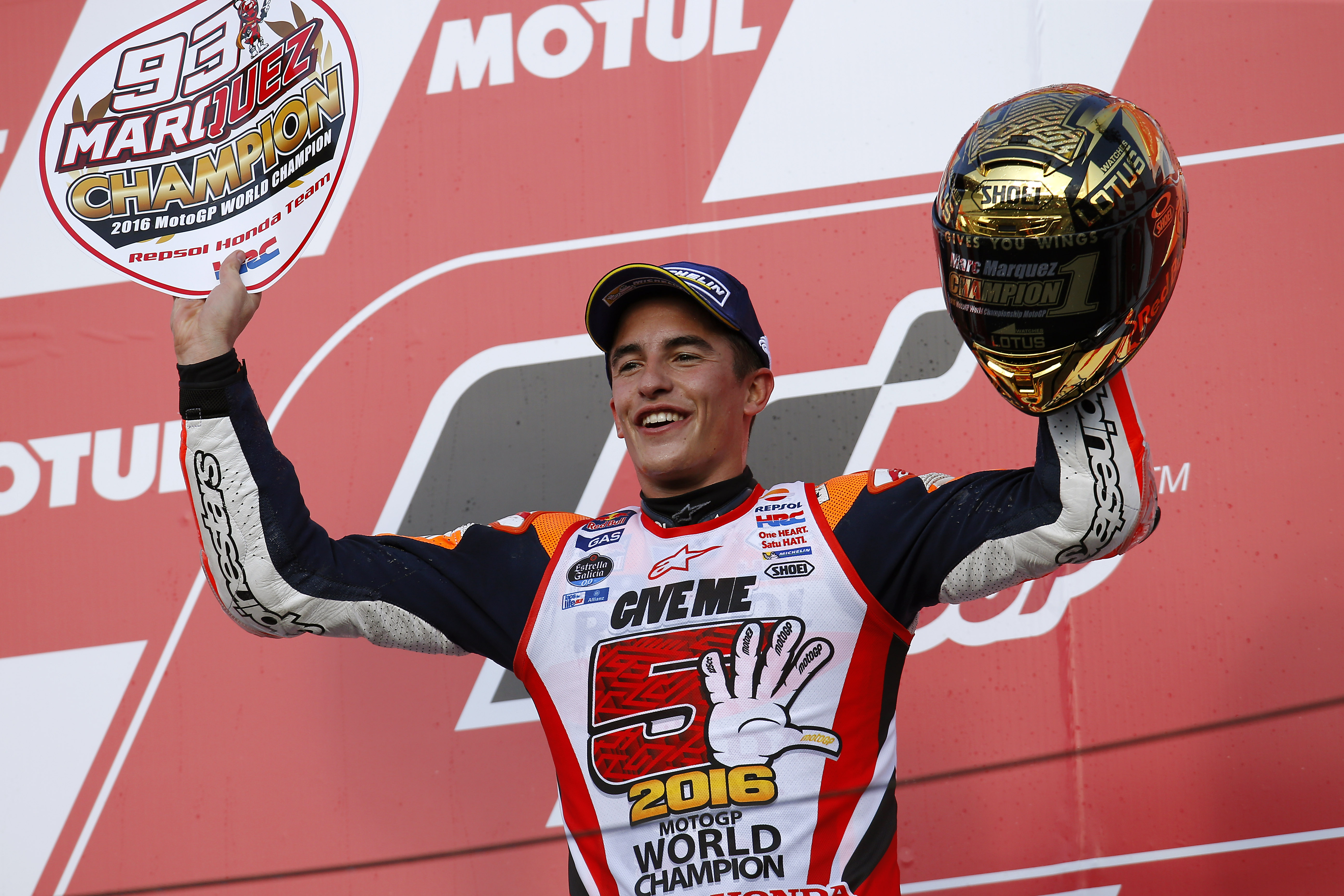
Marc Márquez was the 2016 MotoGP World Riders' Champion.

The 2016 FIM MotoGP World Championship was the premier class of the 68th Fédération Internationale de Motocyclisme (FIM) Road Racing World Championship season, the highest level of competition in motorcycle road racing.

== Season summary ==
Jorge Lorenzo was the defending world champion, having secured his third MotoGP title and fifth overall Championship title at the 2015 Valencian Community Grand Prix.

The riders' championship title was won for the third time by Marc Márquez, after his fifth victory of the season at the Japanese Grand Prix has given him an unassailable lead over his title rivals Lorenzo and Valentino Rossi – who both crashed out at Motegi – with three races remaining. Márquez's title marked a return to the top step for Honda after a difficult 2015 campaign for its factory team. Márquez ultimately won the championship by 49 points.

Reigning champion Lorenzo won three of the first six races to lead the title race, but very poor wet weather form during wet races in mid-season curtailed his title bid along with no wins in the dry until the season-ending race in Valencia. Rossi has been the most consistent title challenger, yet he has crashed out of three races up until Márquez's decisive victory in Japan. The Yamaha team has suffered a severe win drought from June onwards, going eight races without a win before Márquez has clinched the title. The drought reached ten races before Lorenzo's Valencian triumph, in his final race for the manufacturer before his move to Ducati in 2017. Rossi has clinched the runner-up position by 16 points from Lorenzo, while their performances earned Yamaha the teams' championship, although Honda won the manufacturers' championship. The only rookie in this season was Tito Rabat – who clinched the rookie of the year award. LCR Honda rider, Cal Crutchlow, achieved the top independent rider award; winning races at Brno and Phillip Island and finished in 7th place in the championship with 141 points. Ducati and Suzuki both have won at least one race during the season, with Ducati's first win marking the first non Yamaha or Honda win for six years.

The 2016 season saw numerous records in regards to race winners. Cal Crutchlow, Jack Miller, Andrea Iannone and Maverick Viñales each won their first races in the premier class, the first time that four new winners had emerged in a MotoGP season. Between the Italian Grand Prix in May and the San Marino Grand Prix in September, eight riders – Lorenzo, Rossi, Miller, Márquez, Iannone, Crutchlow, Viñales and Dani Pedrosa – won in eight successive races, surpassing the previous record of seven, between the 1999 Imola Grand Prix and the 2000 South African Grand Prix. With a win for Andrea Dovizioso in Malaysia further adding to the tally, the total of nine winners was also a record for a single premier class season, surpassing the previous record of eight in the 2000 season. This season also marked the first non-factory teams to win a race since the 2006 season, with wins for Marc VDS from Miller (at the Dutch TT) and for LCR from Crutchlow (at the Czech and Australian Grands Prix).

== Calendar ==
The following Grands Prix took place in 2016:

Round	Date	Grand Prix	Circuit
1	20 March ‡	Commercial Bank Grand Prix of Qatar	Lusail International Circuit, Lusail
2	3 April	Gran Premio Motul de la República Argentina	Autódromo Termas de Río Hondo, Termas de Río Hondo
3	10 April	(United States) Red Bull Grand Prix of the Americas	Circuit of the Americas, Austin
4	24 April	(Spain) Gran Premio Red Bull de España	Circuito de Jerez, Jerez de la Frontera
5	8 May	Monster Energy Grand Prix de France	Bugatti Circuit, Le Mans
6	22 May	(Italy) Gran Premio d'Italia TIM	Mugello Circuit, Scarperia e San Piero
7	5 June	(Catalonia) Gran Premi Monster Energy de Catalunya	Circuit de Barcelona-Catalunya, Montmeló
8	26 June	(Netherlands) Motul TT Assen	TT Circuit Assen, Assen
9	17 July	(Germany) GoPro Motorrad Grand Prix Deutschland	Sachsenring, Hohenstein-Ernstthal
10	14 August	(Austria) NeroGiardini Motorrad Grand Prix von Österreich	Red Bull Ring, Spielberg
11	21 August	(Czech Republic) HJC Helmets Grand Prix České republiky	Brno Circuit, Brno
12	4 September	(United Kingdom) Octo British Grand Prix	Silverstone Circuit, Silverstone
13	11 September	Gran Premio TIM di San Marino e della Riviera di Rimini	Misano World Circuit, Misano Adriatico
14	25 September	(Aragon) Gran Premio Movistar de Aragón	MotorLand Aragón, Alcañiz
15	16 October	Motul Grand Prix of Japan	Motegi Circuit, Motegi
16	23 October	(Australia) Michelin Australian Motorcycle Grand Prix	Phillip Island Grand Prix Circuit, Phillip Island
17	30 October	Shell Malaysia Motorcycle Grand Prix	Sepang International Circuit, Sepang
18	13 November	(Valencian Community) Gran Premio Motul de la Comunitat Valenciana	Circuit Ricardo Tormo, Valencia

‡ = Night race

=== Calendar changes ===
- The Grand Prix of the Americas and the Argentine Grand Prix have swapped places, with Argentina hosting the second round, while the Grand Prix of the Americas hosts the third round.
- For the first time in the history of the Dutch TT, the races were held on a Sunday.
- The 2016 season had seen the return of the Austrian Grand Prix to the series' schedule after 19 years of absence. The last race, which had been the 1997 Austrian Grand Prix, was held at the A1 Ring, now called the Red Bull Ring.
- Having been on the calendar since 2008, the Indianapolis Grand Prix was taken off the calendar.

== Teams and riders ==
A provisional entry list was announced on 7 November 2015.

Team	Constructor	Motorcycle	No.	Rider	Rounds
(Italy) Aprilia Racing Team Gresini	Aprilia	RS-GP	6	(Germany) Stefan Bradl	All
(Italy) Aprilia Racing Team Gresini	Aprilia	RS-GP	19	(Spain) Álvaro Bautista	All
(Italy) Ducati Team	Ducati	Desmosedici GP16	04	(Italy) Andrea Dovizioso	All
(Italy) Ducati Team	Ducati	Desmosedici GP16	29	(Italy) Andrea Iannone	1–14, 17–18 (Note: Andrea Iannone competed in Friday practice sessions at Misano and Aragón, before being replaced by Michele Pirro. At Misano, Pirro initially competed as a wildcard, but was officially designated as a rider replacement.)
(Italy) Ducati Team	Ducati	Desmosedici GP16	51	(Italy) Michele Pirro	13–14
(Italy) Ducati Team	Ducati	Desmosedici GP16	8	(Spain) Héctor Barberá	15–16
(Italy) Ducati Team	Ducati	Desmosedici GP16	51	(Italy) Michele Pirro	6, 10
(Italy) Octo Pramac Yakhnich	Ducati	Desmosedici GP15	9	(Italy) Danilo Petrucci	1, 5–18
(Italy) Octo Pramac Yakhnich	Ducati	Desmosedici GP15	51	(Italy) Michele Pirro	2–4
(Italy) Octo Pramac Yakhnich	Ducati	Desmosedici GP15	45	(United Kingdom) Scott Redding	All
(Spain) Avintia Racing	Ducati	Desmosedici GP14	8	(Spain) Héctor Barberá	1–14, 17–18
(Spain) Avintia Racing	Ducati	Desmosedici GP14	7	(Australia) Mike Jones	15–16
(Spain) Avintia Racing	Ducati	Desmosedici GP14	76	(France) Loris Baz	1–6, 9–12, 14–18
(Spain) Avintia Racing	Ducati	Desmosedici GP14	51	(Italy) Michele Pirro	7–8
(Spain) Avintia Racing	Ducati	Desmosedici GP14	12	(Spain) Javier Forés	13
(Spain) Aspar Team MotoGP (Spain) Pull & Bear Aspar Team	Ducati	Desmosedici GP14	50	(Republic of Ireland) Eugene Laverty	All
(Spain) Aspar Team MotoGP (Spain) Pull & Bear Aspar Team	Ducati	Desmosedici GP14	68	(Colombia) Yonny Hernández	All
(Japan) Repsol Honda Team	Honda	RC213V	26	(Spain) Dani Pedrosa	1–15, 18 (Note: Dani Pedrosa competed in Friday practice sessions at Motegi, before crashing heavily and fracturing a collarbone. He was replaced by Hiroshi Aoyama for the remainder of the weekend.)
(Japan) Repsol Honda Team	Honda	RC213V	73	(Japan) Hiroshi Aoyama	15
(Japan) Repsol Honda Team	Honda	RC213V	7	(Japan) Hiroshi Aoyama	17
(Japan) Repsol Honda Team	Honda	RC213V	69	(United States) Nicky Hayden	16
(Japan) Repsol Honda Team	Honda	RC213V	93	(Spain) Marc Márquez	All
(Monaco) LCR Honda	Honda	RC213V	35	(United Kingdom) Cal Crutchlow	All
(Belgium) Estrella Galicia 0,0 Marc VDS	Honda	RC213V	43	(Australia) Jack Miller	1–10, 12–13, 15–18
(Belgium) Estrella Galicia 0,0 Marc VDS	Honda	RC213V	69	(United States) Nicky Hayden	14
(Belgium) Estrella Galicia 0,0 Marc VDS	Honda	RC213V	53	(Spain) Tito Rabat	All
(Austria) Red Bull KTM Factory Racing	KTM	RC16	36	(Finland) Mika Kallio	18
(Japan) Team Suzuki Ecstar	Suzuki	GSX-RR	25	(Spain) Maverick Viñales	All
(Japan) Team Suzuki Ecstar	Suzuki	GSX-RR	41	(Spain) Aleix Espargaró	All
(Japan) Movistar Yamaha MotoGP	Yamaha	YZR-M1	46	(Italy) Valentino Rossi	All
(Japan) Movistar Yamaha MotoGP	Yamaha	YZR-M1	99	(Spain) Jorge Lorenzo	All
(Japan) Yamalube Yamaha Factory Racing	Yamaha	YZR-M1	21	(Japan) Katsuyuki Nakasuga	15
(France) Monster Yamaha Tech 3	Yamaha	YZR-M1	38	(United Kingdom) Bradley Smith	1–11, 15–18
(France) Monster Yamaha Tech 3	Yamaha	YZR-M1	22	(United Kingdom) Alex Lowes	12–14
(France) Monster Yamaha Tech 3	Yamaha	YZR-M1	44	(Spain) Pol Espargaró	All

Key
Regular rider
Wildcard rider
Replacement rider

Notes

All the bikes used Michelin tyres.

=== Team changes ===
- Marc VDS Racing expanded to enter a second bike.
- After entering two bikes in 2015, LCR Team reverted to a single entry in 2016.
- The Aspar Team ended their association with Honda and returned to Ducati; the team had used Ducatis in 2010 and 2011.
- Forward Racing left MotoGP, as they announced a new partnership with MV Agusta in the Superbike World Championship and Supersport World Championship in 2016.
- AB Motoracing left MotoGP as Karel Abraham moved to the Superbike World Championship.
- IodaRacing announced that they would have left MotoGP and competed in the Superbike World Championship. Their constructor, ART, also left MotoGP.

=== Rider changes ===
- Tito Rabat, the 2014 Moto2 World Champion, made his MotoGP debut with Marc VDS Racing, the team he had won the Moto2 title with.
- Yonny Hernández did not have his contract with Pramac Racing renewed, and moved to Aspar Team to replace Nicky Hayden, who left MotoGP for the Superbike World Championship.
- Having competed in MotoGP since 2011, Karel Abraham switched to the Superbike World Championship.
- Loris Baz moved to Avintia Racing to replace Mike Di Meglio who moved to the Endurance World Championship.
- Scott Redding left Marc VDS Racing at the end of the 2015 season to join Pramac Racing. His place was taken by Jack Miller.
- Alex de Angelis left MotoGP for the Superbike World Championship.
- Stefan Bradl remained with Aprilia after riding for them as a replacement rider in the 2015 season after Marco Melandri left MotoGP during the middle of the season.

== Rule changes ==
- Starting in 2016, Michelin has become the series' official tyre supplier following Bridgestone's withdrawal from the category. The Grand Prix Commission have also agreed a rule change to the 2016 regulations to increase the wheel size from 16.5 inches to 17 inches (similar to Moto2 and Moto3).
- The previous Factory and Open classes will be merged: every bike must adopt the unified electronic package (ECU and software). Each rider will be able to use up to seven engines in a season, albeit with frozen specifications, and the maximum fuel tank capacity will be 22 litres. Factories without a dry win between 2013 and 2015 will still be allowed to use 12 engines with free development, but in case of a determined number of podiums or wins scored during 2016 the factory will lose these benefits for the next season. Similarly, any manufacturer not scoring a single podium in 2016 will gain those concessions in 2017.

== Results and standings ==
=== Grands Prix ===
Round	Grand Prix	Pole position	Fastest lap	Winning rider	Winning team	Winning constructor	Report
1	Qatar motorcycle Grand Prix	(Spain) Jorge Lorenzo	(Spain) Jorge Lorenzo	(Spain) Jorge Lorenzo	(Japan) Movistar Yamaha MotoGP	(Japan) Yamaha	Report
2	(Argentina) Argentine Republic motorcycle Grand Prix	(Spain) Marc Márquez	(Spain) Marc Márquez	(Spain) Marc Márquez	(Japan) Repsol Honda Team	(Japan) Honda	Report
3	(United States) Motorcycle Grand Prix of the Americas	(Spain) Marc Márquez	(Spain) Marc Márquez	(Spain) Marc Márquez	(Japan) Repsol Honda Team	(Japan) Honda	Report
4	(Spain) Spanish motorcycle Grand Prix	(Italy) Valentino Rossi	(Italy) Valentino Rossi	(Italy) Valentino Rossi	(Japan) Movistar Yamaha MotoGP	(Japan) Yamaha	Report
5	(France) French motorcycle Grand Prix	(Spain) Jorge Lorenzo	(Italy) Valentino Rossi	(Spain) Jorge Lorenzo	(Japan) Movistar Yamaha MotoGP	(Japan) Yamaha	Report
6	(Italy) Italian motorcycle Grand Prix	(Italy) Valentino Rossi	(Italy) Andrea Iannone	(Spain) Jorge Lorenzo	(Japan) Movistar Yamaha MotoGP	(Japan) Yamaha	Report
7	(Catalonia) Catalan motorcycle Grand Prix	(Spain) Marc Márquez	(Spain) Maverick Viñales	(Italy) Valentino Rossi	(Japan) Movistar Yamaha MotoGP	(Japan) Yamaha	Report
8	(Netherlands) Dutch TT	(Italy) Andrea Dovizioso	(Italy) Danilo Petrucci	(Australia) Jack Miller	(Belgium) Estrella Galicia 0,0 Marc VDS	(Japan) Honda	Report
9	(Germany) German motorcycle Grand Prix	(Spain) Marc Márquez	(United Kingdom) Cal Crutchlow	(Spain) Marc Márquez	(Japan) Repsol Honda Team	(Japan) Honda	Report
10	(Austria) Austrian motorcycle Grand Prix	(Italy) Andrea Iannone	(Italy) Andrea Iannone	(Italy) Andrea Iannone	(Italy) Ducati Team	(Italy) Ducati	Report
11	Czech Republic motorcycle Grand Prix	(Spain) Marc Márquez	(United Kingdom) Cal Crutchlow	(United Kingdom) Cal Crutchlow	(Monaco) LCR Honda	(Japan) Honda	Report
12	(United Kingdom) British motorcycle Grand Prix	(United Kingdom) Cal Crutchlow	(Spain) Maverick Viñales	(Spain) Maverick Viñales	(Japan) Team Suzuki Ecstar	(Japan) Suzuki	Report
13	San Marino and Rimini Riviera motorcycle Grand Prix	(Spain) Jorge Lorenzo	(Spain) Dani Pedrosa	(Spain) Dani Pedrosa	(Japan) Repsol Honda Team	(Japan) Honda	Report
14	Aragon motorcycle Grand Prix	(Spain) Marc Márquez	(Spain) Marc Márquez	(Spain) Marc Márquez	(Japan) Repsol Honda Team	(Japan) Honda	Report
15	(Japan) Japanese motorcycle Grand Prix	(Italy) Valentino Rossi	(Spain) Marc Márquez	(Spain) Marc Márquez	(Japan) Repsol Honda Team	(Japan) Honda	Report
16	(Australia) Australian motorcycle Grand Prix	(Spain) Marc Márquez	(United Kingdom) Cal Crutchlow	(United Kingdom) Cal Crutchlow	(Monaco) LCR Honda	(Japan) Honda	Report
17	(Malaysia) Malaysian motorcycle Grand Prix	(Italy) Andrea Dovizioso	(Italy) Andrea Dovizioso	(Italy) Andrea Dovizioso	(Italy) Ducati Team	(Italy) Ducati	Report
18	Valencian Community motorcycle Grand Prix	(Spain) Jorge Lorenzo	(Spain) Jorge Lorenzo	(Spain) Jorge Lorenzo	(Japan) Movistar Yamaha MotoGP	(Japan) Yamaha	Report

=== Riders' standings ===
Scoring system

Points were awarded to the top fifteen finishers. A rider had to finish the race to earn points.

Position	**1st**	**2nd**	**3rd**	**4th**	**5th**	**6th**	**7th**	**8th**	**9th**	**10th**	**11th**	**12th**	**13th**	**14th**	**15th**
Points	25	20	16	13	11	10	9	8	7	6	5	4	3	2	1

Pos	Rider	Bike	Team	QAT (Qatar)	ARG (Argentina)	AME (United States)	SPA (Spain)	FRA (France)	ITA (Italy)	CAT (Catalonia)	NED (Netherlands)	GER (Germany)	AUT (Austria)	CZE (Czech Republic)	GBR (United Kingdom)	RSM (San Marino)	ARA (Aragon)	JPN (Japan)	AUS (Australia)	MAL (Malaysia)	VAL (Valencian Community)	Pts
1	(Spain) Marc Márquez	Honda	Repsol Honda Team	3	**1**	**1**	3	13	2	**2**	2	**1**	5	**3**	4	4	**1**	1	**Ret**	11	2	298
2	(Italy) Valentino Rossi	Yamaha	Movistar Yamaha MotoGP	4	2	Ret	**1**	2	**Ret**	1	Ret	8	4	2	3	2	3	**Ret**	2	2	4	249
3	(Spain) Jorge Lorenzo	Yamaha	Movistar Yamaha MotoGP	**1**	Ret	2	2	**1**	1	Ret	10	15	3	17	8	**3**	2	Ret	6	3	**1**	233
4	(Spain) Maverick Viñales	Suzuki	Team Suzuki Ecstar	6	Ret	4	6	3	6	4	9	12	6	9	1	5	4	3	3	6	5	202
5	(Italy) Andrea Dovizioso	Ducati	Ducati Team	2	13	Ret	Ret	Ret	5	7	**Ret**	3	2	Ret	6	6	11	2	4	**1**	7	171
6	(Spain) Dani Pedrosa	Honda	Repsol Honda Team	5	3	Ret	4	4	4	3	12	6	7	12	5	1	6	WD			Ret	155
7	(United Kingdom) Cal Crutchlow	Honda	LCR Honda	Ret	Ret	16	11	Ret	11	6	Ret	2	15	1	**2**	8	5	5	1	Ret	Ret	141
8	(Spain) Pol Espargaró	Yamaha	Monster Yamaha Tech 3	7	6	7	8	5	15	5	4	Ret	10	13	DNS	9	8	6	5	9	6	134
9	(Italy) Andrea Iannone	Ducati	Ducati Team	Ret	Ret	3	7	Ret	3	Ret	5	5	**1**	8	Ret	WD	WD			Ret	3	112
10	(Spain) Héctor Barberá	Ducati	Avintia Racing	9	5	9	10	8	12	11	6	9	DSQ	5	14	13	13			4	11	102
10	(Spain) Héctor Barberá	Ducati	Ducati Team															17	Ret			102
11	(Spain) Aleix Espargaró	Suzuki	Team Suzuki Ecstar	11	11	5	5	6	9	Ret	Ret	14	Ret	Ret	7	Ret	7	4	Ret	13	8	93
12	(Spain) Álvaro Bautista	Aprilia	Aprilia Racing Team Gresini	13	10	11	Ret	9	Ret	8	Ret	10	16	16	10	10	9	7	12	7	10	82
13	(Republic of Ireland) Eugene Laverty	Ducati	Pull & Bear Aspar Team	12	4	12	9	11	13	13	7	11	18	6	12	14	14	Ret	14	12	16	77
14	(Italy) Danilo Petrucci	Ducati	Octo Pramac Yakhnich	DNS				7	8	9	Ret	Ret	11	7	9	11	17	8	9	10	12	75
15	(United Kingdom) Scott Redding	Ducati	Octo Pramac Yakhnich	10	Ret	6	19	Ret	Ret	16	3	4	8	15	17	15	19	9	7	15	14	74
16	(Germany) Stefan Bradl	Aprilia	Aprilia Racing Team Gresini	Ret	7	10	14	10	14	12	8	DNS	19	14	Ret	12	10	10	11	17	13	63
17	(United Kingdom) Bradley Smith	Yamaha	Monster Yamaha Tech 3	8	8	17	12	Ret	7	Ret	13	13	9	Ret				13	8	14	9	62
18	(Australia) Jack Miller	Honda	Estrella Galicia 0,0 Marc VDS	14	Ret	DNS	17	Ret	Ret	10	1	7	DNS		16	DNS		Ret	10	8	15	57
19	(Italy) Michele Pirro	Ducati	Octo Pramac Yakhnich		12	8	16															36
19	(Italy) Michele Pirro	Ducati	Ducati Team						10				12			7	12					36
19	(Italy) Michele Pirro	Ducati	Avintia Racing							15	Ret											36
20	(France) Loris Baz	Ducati	Avintia Racing	Ret	Ret	15	13	12	Ret			17	13	4	DNS		18	16	Ret	5	18	35
21	(Spain) Tito Rabat	Honda	Estrella Galicia 0,0 Marc VDS	15	9	13	18	Ret	DNS	14	11	16	14	10	15	17	Ret	14	16	18	17	29
22	(Colombia) Yonny Hernández	Ducati	Pull & Bear Aspar Team	Ret	Ret	14	15	Ret	16	17	Ret	18	17	11	11	16	16	12	13	Ret	Ret	20
23	(Japan) Katsuyuki Nakasuga	Yamaha	Yamalube Yamaha Factory Racing															11				5
24	(United Kingdom) Alex Lowes	Yamaha	Monster Yamaha Tech 3												13	Ret	DNS					3
25	(Japan) Hiroshi Aoyama	Honda	Repsol Honda Team															15		16		1
26	(United States) Nicky Hayden	Honda	Estrella Galicia 0,0 Marc VDS														15					1
26	(United States) Nicky Hayden	Honda	Repsol Honda Team																17			1
27	(Australia) Mike Jones	Ducati	Avintia Racing															18	15			1
	(Finland) Mika Kallio	KTM	Red Bull KTM Factory Racing																		Ret	0
	(Spain) Javier Forés	Ducati	Avintia Racing													Ret						0
Pos	Rider	Bike	Team	QAT (Qatar)	ARG (Argentina)	AME (United States)	SPA (Spain)	FRA (France)	ITA (Italy)	CAT (Catalonia)	NED (Netherlands)	GER (Germany)	AUT (Austria)	CZE (Czech Republic)	GBR (United Kingdom)	RSM (San Marino)	ARA (Aragon)	JPN (Japan)	AUS (Australia)	MAL (Malaysia)	VAL (Valencian Community)	Pts

Colour	Result
Gold	Winner
Silver	Second place
Bronze	Third place
Green	Points classification
Blue	Non-points classification
Blue	Non-classified finish (NC)
Purple	Retired, not classified (Ret)
Red	Did not qualify (DNQ)
Red	Did not pre-qualify (DNPQ)
Black	Disqualified (DSQ)
White	Did not start (DNS)
White	Withdrew (WD)
White	Race cancelled (C)
Blank	Did not practice (DNP)
Blank	Did not arrive (DNA)
Blank	Excluded (EX)

**Bold** – Pole
Italics – Fastest lap
Light blue – Rookie

=== Constructors' standings ===
Each constructor received the same number of points as their best placed rider in each race.

Pos	Constructor	QAT (Qatar)	ARG (Argentina)	AME (United States)	SPA (Spain)	FRA (France)	ITA (Italy)	CAT (Catalonia)	NED (Netherlands)	GER (Germany)	AUT (Austria)	CZE (Czech Republic)	GBR (United Kingdom)	RSM (San Marino)	ARA (Aragon)	JPN (Japan)	AUS (Australia)	MAL (Malaysia)	VAL (Valencian Community)	Pts
1	(Japan) Honda	3	1	1	3	4	2	2	1	1	5	1	2	1	1	1	1	8	2	369
2	(Japan) Yamaha	1	2	2	1	1	1	1	4	8	3	2	3	2	2	6	2	2	1	353
3	(Italy) Ducati	2	4	3	7	7	3	7	3	3	1	4	6	6	11	2	4	1	3	261
4	(Japan) Suzuki	6	11	4	5	3	6	4	9	12	6	9	1	5	4	3	3	6	5	208
5	(Italy) Aprilia	13	7	10	14	9	14	8	8	10	16	14	10	10	9	7	11	7	10	101
	(Austria) KTM																		Ret	0
Pos	Constructor	QAT (Qatar)	ARG (Argentina)	AME (United States)	SPA (Spain)	FRA (France)	ITA (Italy)	CAT (Catalonia)	NED (Netherlands)	GER (Germany)	AUT (Austria)	CZE (Czech Republic)	GBR (United Kingdom)	RSM (San Marino)	ARA (Aragon)	JPN (Japan)	AUS (Australia)	MAL (Malaysia)	VAL (Valencian Community)	Pts

=== Teams' standings ===
The teams' standings were based on results obtained by regular and substitute riders; wild-card entries were ineligible.

Pos	Team	Bike No.	QAT (Qatar)	ARG (Argentina)	AME (United States)	SPA (Spain)	FRA (France)	ITA (Italy)	CAT (Catalonia)	NED (Netherlands)	GER (Germany)	AUT (Austria)	CZE (Czech Republic)	GBR (United Kingdom)	RSM (San Marino)	ARA (Aragon)	JPN (Japan)	AUS (Australia)	MAL (Malaysia)	VAL (Valencian Community)	Pts
1	(Japan) Movistar Yamaha MotoGP	46	4	2	Ret	**1**	2	**Ret**	1	Ret	8	4	2	3	2	3	**Ret**	2	2	4	482
1	(Japan) Movistar Yamaha MotoGP	99	**1**	Ret	2	2	**1**	1	Ret	10	15	3	17	8	**3**	2	Ret	6	3	**1**	482
2	(Japan) Repsol Honda Team	7																	16		454
2	(Japan) Repsol Honda Team	26	5	3	Ret	4	4	4	3	12	6	7	12	5	1	6	WD			Ret	454
2	(Japan) Repsol Honda Team	69																17			454
2	(Japan) Repsol Honda Team	73															15				454
2	(Japan) Repsol Honda Team	93	3	**1**	**1**	3	13	2	**2**	2	**1**	5	**3**	4	4	**1**	1	**Ret**	11	2	454
3	(Italy) Ducati Team	04	2	13	Ret	Ret	Ret	5	7	**Ret**	3	2	Ret	6	6	11	2	4	**1**	7	296
3	(Italy) Ducati Team	8															17	Ret			296
3	(Italy) Ducati Team	29	Ret	Ret	3	7	Ret	3	Ret	5	5	**1**	8	Ret	WD	WD			Ret	3	296
3	(Italy) Ducati Team	51													7	12					296
4	(Japan) Team Suzuki Ecstar	25	6	Ret	4	6	3	6	4	9	12	6	9	1	5	4	3	3	6	5	295
4	(Japan) Team Suzuki Ecstar	41	11	11	5	5	6	9	Ret	Ret	14	Ret	Ret	7	Ret	7	4	Ret	13	8	295
5	(France) Monster Yamaha Tech 3	22												13	Ret	DNS					199
5	(France) Monster Yamaha Tech 3	38	8	8	17	12	Ret	7	Ret	13	13	9	Ret				13	8	14	9	199
5	(France) Monster Yamaha Tech 3	44	7	6	7	8	5	15	5	4	Ret	10	13	DNS	9	8	6	5	9	6	199
6	(Italy) Octo Pramac Yakhnich	9	DNS				7	8	9	Ret	Ret	11	7	9	11	17	8	9	10	12	161
6	(Italy) Octo Pramac Yakhnich	45	10	Ret	6	19	Ret	Ret	16	3	4	8	15	17	15	19	9	7	15	14	161
6	(Italy) Octo Pramac Yakhnich	51		12	8	16															161
7	(Italy) Aprilia Racing Team Gresini	6	Ret	7	10	14	10	14	12	8	DNS	19	14	Ret	12	10	10	11	17	13	145
7	(Italy) Aprilia Racing Team Gresini	19	13	10	11	Ret	9	Ret	8	Ret	10	16	16	10	10	9	7	12	7	10	145
8	(Monaco) LCR Honda	35	Ret	Ret	16	11	Ret	11	6	Ret	2	15	1	**2**	8	5	5	1	Ret	Ret	141
9	(Spain) Avintia Racing	7															18	15			139
9	(Spain) Avintia Racing	8	9	5	9	10	8	12	11	6	9	DSQ	5	14	13	13			4	11	139
9	(Spain) Avintia Racing	12													Ret						139
9	(Spain) Avintia Racing	51							15	Ret											139
9	(Spain) Avintia Racing	76	Ret	Ret	15	13	12	Ret			17	13	4	DNS		18	16	Ret	5	18	139
10	(Spain) Pull & Bear Aspar Team	50	12	4	12	9	11	13	13	7	11	18	6	12	14	14	Ret	14	12	16	97
10	(Spain) Pull & Bear Aspar Team	68	Ret	Ret	14	15	Ret	16	17	Ret	18	17	11	11	16	16	12	13	Ret	Ret	97
11	(Belgium) Estrella Galicia 0,0 Marc VDS	43	14	Ret	DNS	17	Ret	Ret	10	1	7	DNS		16	DNS		Ret	10	8	15	87
11	(Belgium) Estrella Galicia 0,0 Marc VDS	53	15	9	13	18	Ret	DNS	14	11	16	14	10	15	17	Ret	14	16	18	17	87
11	(Belgium) Estrella Galicia 0,0 Marc VDS	69														15					87
Pos	Team	Bike No.	QAT (Qatar)	ARG (Argentina)	AME (United States)	SPA (Spain)	FRA (France)	ITA (Italy)	CAT (Catalonia)	NED (Netherlands)	GER (Germany)	AUT (Austria)	CZE (Czech Republic)	GBR (United Kingdom)	RSM (San Marino)	ARA (Aragon)	JPN (Japan)	AUS (Australia)	MAL (Malaysia)	VAL (Valencian Community)	Pts
