= 2014 MotoGP World Championship =

66th running of the MotoGP World Championship

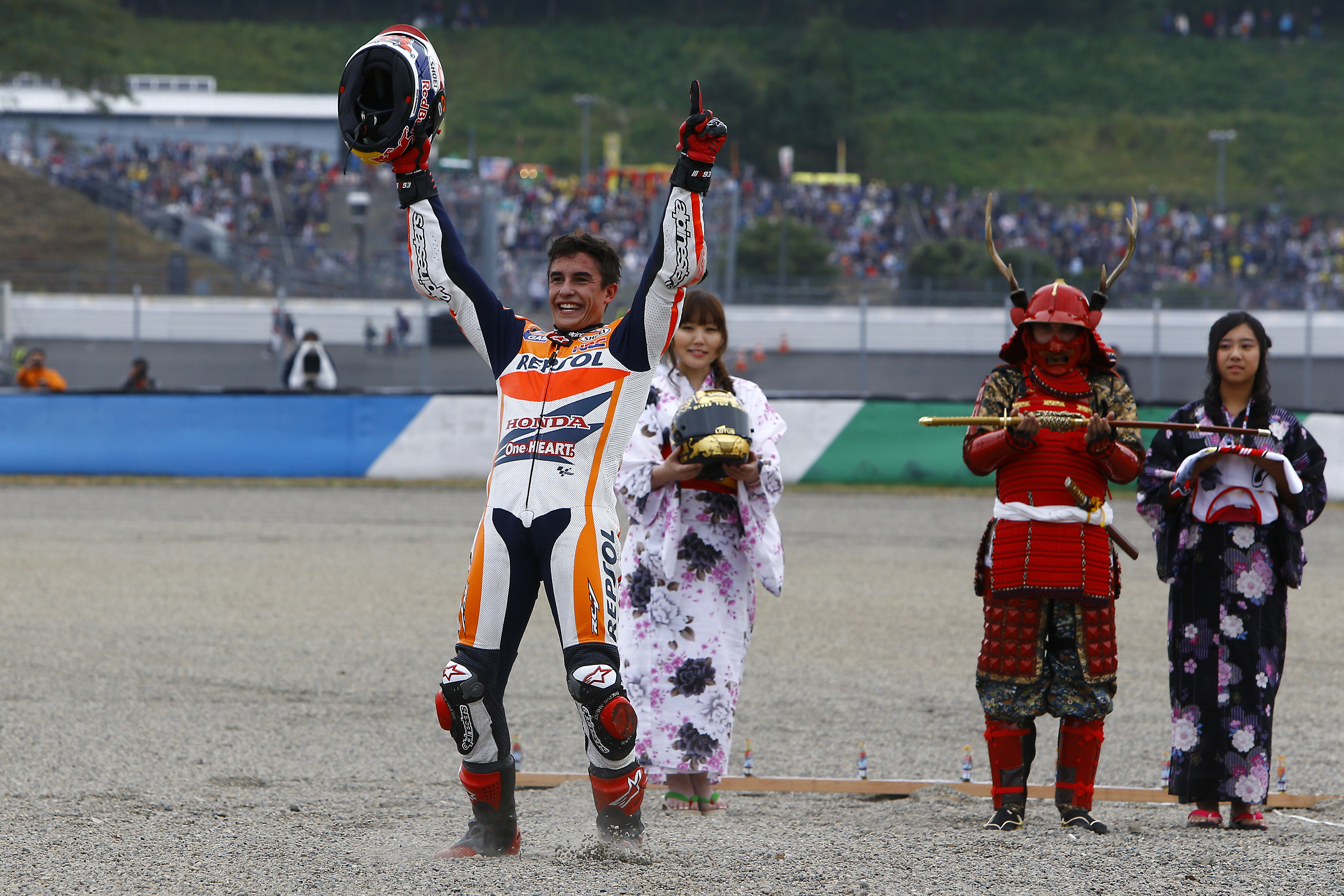
Marc Márquez was the 2014 MotoGP World Riders' Champion.

The 2014 FIM MotoGP World Championship was the premier class of the 66th Fédération Internationale de Motocyclisme (FIM) Road Racing World Championship season, the highest level of competition in motorcycle road racing. Marc Márquez started the season as the defending riders' champion in the MotoGP category, with Honda the defending manufacturers' champions.

== Season summary ==
Winning a premier class record 13 races during the season, Márquez won a second successive title, finishing 67 points clear of his nearest rival Valentino Rossi. Márquez won each of the first 10 races to be held in 2014, before Repsol Honda teammate Dani Pedrosa was able to inflict his first defeat, at Brno. Rossi had taken eight podiums in the season, before he was able to win a race, when he won at Misano. He also won at Phillip Island, as he finished as the championship runner-up in a Grand Prix class for the first time since 2006, when he finished second to Nicky Hayden. Despite bookending his season with retirements, Rossi's Movistar Yamaha MotoGP teammate Jorge Lorenzo finished third in the championship. Finishing 32 points behind Rossi, Lorenzo took back-to-back victories in Aragon, and Japan, as part of a nine-race podium streak that was ended by his retirement in Valencia. The only other race winner was Pedrosa, with his Brno triumph being his sole victory in the 2014 campaign.

The Espargaró brothers were each able to take one of the sub-classifications available to them. Pol Espargaró finished as the best place rookie in the final championship standings, finishing sixth overall; the next best rookie was Scott Redding in twelfth place. Aleix Espargaró was the best placed rider that was competing with an Open-specification motorcycle. He finished seventh overall in the championship, taking a pole position at Assen and a second-place finish in Aragon. Just like the rookie of the year standings, Redding was the next best rider. Márquez was a comfortable winner of the BMW M Award for the best qualifying rider, with 13 pole positions during the season. Repsol Honda were the winners of the teams' championship, as the results for Márquez and Pedrosa allowed them to finish 50 points clear of Movistar Yamaha MotoGP, while Honda won the constructors' championship for the 21st time – and their 63rd title in total – 55 points clear of Yamaha.

== Calendar ==
The Fédération Internationale de Motocyclisme released a 19-race provisional calendar on 2 October 2013. The calendar was updated on 13 December 2013 and again on 24 February 2014, resulting in a calendar of 18 races.

The following Grands Prix took place in 2014:

Round	Date	Grand Prix	Circuit
1	23 March ‡	Commercial Bank Grand Prix of Qatar	Lusail International Circuit, Lusail
2	13 April	(United States) Red Bull Grand Prix of the Americas	Circuit of the Americas, Austin
3	27 April	Gran Premio Red Bull de la República Argentina	Autódromo Termas de Río Hondo, Termas de Río Hondo
4	4 May	(Spain) Gran Premio bwin de España	Circuito de Jerez, Jerez de la Frontera
5	18 May	Monster Energy Grand Prix de France	Bugatti Circuit, Le Mans
6	1 June	(Italy) Gran Premio d'Italia TIM	Mugello Circuit, Scarperia e San Piero
7	15 June	(Catalonia) Gran Premi Monster Energy de Catalunya	Circuit de Barcelona-Catalunya, Montmeló
8	28 June ††	(Netherlands) Iveco Daily TT Assen	TT Circuit Assen, Assen
9	13 July	(Germany) eni Motorrad Grand Prix Deutschland	Sachsenring, Hohenstein-Ernstthal
10	10 August	Red Bull Indianapolis Grand Prix	Indianapolis Motor Speedway, Speedway
11	17 August	(Czech Republic) bwin Grand Prix České republiky	Brno Circuit, Brno
12	31 August	(United Kingdom) Hertz British Grand Prix	Silverstone Circuit, Silverstone
13	14 September	Gran Premio TIM di San Marino e Della Riviera di Rimini	Misano World Circuit, Misano Adriatico
14	28 September	(Aragon) Gran Premio Movistar de Aragón	MotorLand Aragón, Alcañiz
15	12 October	Motul Grand Prix of Japan	Motegi Circuit, Motegi
16	19 October	(Australia) Tissot Australian Grand Prix	Phillip Island Grand Prix Circuit, Phillip Island
17	26 October	(Malaysia) Shell Advance Malaysian Motorcycle Grand Prix	Sepang International Circuit, Sepang
18	9 November	(Valencian Community) Gran Premio Generali de la Comunitat Valenciana	Circuit Ricardo Tormo, Valencia

‡ = Night race
†† = Saturday race

=== Calendar changes ===
- The Argentine Grand Prix was added to the calendar, the series' first visit to South America since 2004. The venue hosting the round was the new Autódromo Termas de Río Hondo, instead of the Autódromo Juan y Oscar Gálvez which hosted the round until 1999.
- The United States Grand Prix, present since 2005, was taken off the calendar because the race could not initially be run with all 3 classes in the United States due to Californian environmental laws, and that in turn caused the race at the Laguna Seca Raceway to become unsustainable.
- A race in Brazil at the Autódromo Internacional Nelson Piquet in Brasilia was scheduled for 28 September, but was subsequently removed from the calendar. The round at MotorLand Aragón was moved back by a week, following the cancellation of the Brazilian round.

== Teams and riders ==
Starting in 2014, the rules governing the eligibility of entries changed. MSMA prototypes were reclassified as the new "Factory" class, whilst the Claiming Rule Teams sub-category was restructured as the "Open" class. All bikes used the approved MotoGP Electronic Control Unit, with bikes in the "Open" class using both the MotoGP ECU and identical software, and those competing as "Factory" entries permitted to use their own custom software. The Factory option bike had their allocation of engines reduced from twelve to five, and those five had their design frozen. The amount of fuel allowed was reduced from twenty-four litres to twenty litres.

A subsequent modification, only officialized in March, stated that a manufacturer who had not achieved a win in dry conditions in the previous year, or a new manufacturer entering the championship, could enter under the Factory option with all the concessions available to the Open class; these benefits were reduced in case of a determined number of podiums or wins.

Ducati Team and Pramac Racing were due to enter their bikes in the Open class but revised regulations meant that they were finally entered under the Factory option with Open concessions.

2014 MotoGP specifications
	Factory	Open
Fuel tank (litres)	20	24
Engines allocated (per rider)	5	12
Engine development	frozen	free
ECU hardware	various	spec Magneti Marelli
ECU software	free	standardized
Tires' compound	medium, hard	soft, medium

A provisional entry list was released by the Fédération Internationale de Motocyclisme on 20 November 2013. An updated entry list was released on 14 January 2014. Teams had time until 28 February to decide if a rider would be assigned to the "Factory" or "Open" class. The final entry list was released on the same day.

Factory entries
Team	Constructor	Motorcycle	No.	Rider	Rounds
(Italy) Ducati Team	Ducati	Desmosedici GP14	04	(Italy) Andrea Dovizioso	All
(Italy) Ducati Team	Ducati	Desmosedici GP14	35	(United Kingdom) Cal Crutchlow	1–2, 4–18
(Italy) Ducati Team	Ducati	Desmosedici GP14	51	(Italy) Michele Pirro	3
(Italy) Ducati Team	Ducati	Desmosedici GP14	51	(Italy) Michele Pirro	4, 6–7, 11, 18
(Italy) Pramac Racing (Italy) Energy T.I. Pramac Racing	Ducati	Desmosedici GP14	29	(Italy) Andrea Iannone	All
(Italy) Pramac Racing (Italy) Energy T.I. Pramac Racing	Ducati	Desmosedici GP13	68	(Colombia) Yonny Hernández	All
(Japan) Repsol Honda Team	Honda	RC213V	26	(Spain) Dani Pedrosa	All
(Japan) Repsol Honda Team	Honda	RC213V	93	(Spain) Marc Márquez	All
(Monaco) LCR Honda MotoGP	Honda	RC213V	6	(Germany) Stefan Bradl	All
(Italy) Go&Fun Honda Gresini	Honda	RC213V	19	(Spain) Álvaro Bautista	All
(Japan) Team Suzuki MotoGP	Suzuki	GSX-RR	14	(France) Randy de Puniet	18
(Japan) Movistar Yamaha MotoGP	Yamaha	YZR-M1	46	(Italy) Valentino Rossi	All
(Japan) Movistar Yamaha MotoGP	Yamaha	YZR-M1	99	(Spain) Jorge Lorenzo	All
(Japan) Yamalube Racing Team with YSP	Yamaha	YZR-M1	21	(Japan) Katsuyuki Nakasuga	15
(France) Monster Yamaha Tech 3	Yamaha	YZR-M1	38	(United Kingdom) Bradley Smith	All
(France) Monster Yamaha Tech 3	Yamaha	YZR-M1	44	(Spain) Pol Espargaró	All
Open entries
Team	Constructor	Motorcycle	No.	Rider	Rounds
(Italy) IodaRacing Project (Italy) Octo IodaRacing Team	ART	ART GP13	9	(Italy) Danilo Petrucci	1–4, 8–18
(Italy) IodaRacing Project (Italy) Octo IodaRacing Team	ART	ART GP13	84	(Italy) Michel Fabrizio	6–7
(Spain) Avintia Racing	Avintia	GP14	63	(France) Mike Di Meglio	All
(Spain) Avintia Racing	Avintia	GP14	8	(Spain) Héctor Barberá	1–13
(Spain) Avintia Racing	Ducati	Desmosedici GP14	8	(Spain) Héctor Barberá	14–18
(Switzerland) NGM Forward Racing	Forward Yamaha	Forward-Yamaha	5	(United States) Colin Edwards	1–10
(Switzerland) NGM Forward Racing	Forward Yamaha	Forward-Yamaha	15	(San Marino) Alex de Angelis	11–18
(Switzerland) NGM Forward Racing	Forward Yamaha	Forward-Yamaha	41	(Spain) Aleix Espargaró	All
(Spain) Drive M7 Aspar	Honda	RC213V-RS	7	(Japan) Hiroshi Aoyama	18
(Spain) Drive M7 Aspar	Honda	RCV1000R	7	(Japan) Hiroshi Aoyama	1–17
(Spain) Drive M7 Aspar	Honda	RCV1000R	69	(United States) Nicky Hayden	1–9, 14–18
(Spain) Drive M7 Aspar	Honda	RCV1000R	2	(United Kingdom) Leon Camier	10–13
(Czech Republic) Cardion AB Motoracing	Honda	RCV1000R	17	(Czech Republic) Karel Abraham	All
(Italy) Go&Fun Honda Gresini	Honda	RCV1000R	45	(United Kingdom) Scott Redding	All
(United Kingdom) Paul Bird Motorsport	PBM	PBM 01	23	(Australia) Broc Parkes	All
(United Kingdom) Paul Bird Motorsport	PBM	PBM 01	70	(United Kingdom) Michael Laverty	All

Key
Regular rider
Wildcard rider
Replacement rider

All the bikes used Bridgestone tyres.

=== Team changes ===
- Aspar Team and Cardion AB Motoracing switched to Honda in 2014, entering the RCV1000R, Honda's Open class machine.
- Forward Racing intended to use Yamaha-leased YZR-M1 engines with FTR frames, however the team started the season with a complete Yamaha YZR-M1 engine-frame-swingarm package with other parts supplied by FTR, while developing new Forward-designed frames to be introduced mid-season. At the Mugello round Colin Edwards debuted the new frame built by Harris Performance. Following Edwards' retirement from racing, the new frame was passed to de Angelis, while Espargaró remained with the Yamaha-derived chassis.
- Gresini Racing competed with a full Honda package in the Open class, having contested the 2013 season with an FTR chassis and Honda engine.
- IodaRacing Project intended to enter a second bike ridden by Leon Camier, but he was not included on the final entry list due to an apparent lack of funding.

=== Rider changes ===
- Nicky Hayden moved from Ducati Corse to Aspar Team. Cal Crutchlow left Yamaha Tech 3 to take Hayden's place.
- 2013 Moto2 Riders' Champion Pol Espargaró joined the premier category, racing for Yamaha Tech 3.
- Aleix Espargaró moved from Aspar Racing to Forward Racing.
- Hiroshi Aoyama moved to Aspar Racing after competing for Avintia Blusens in 2013.
- Bryan Staring left Gresini Racing, with his place taken by 2013 Moto2 runner-up Scott Redding.
- Yonny Hernández remained with Pramac Racing after Ben Spies retired from racing at the end of the 2013 season.
- Mike Di Meglio joined the premier category, racing for Avintia Racing.
- Broc Parkes made his MotoGP debut with Paul Bird Motorsport.
- Leon Camier contested the Indianapolis, Czech Republic, British, and San Marino races for Aspar Team as an injury replacement for Nicky Hayden.
- Alex de Angelis replaced Colin Edwards from Brno onwards.

== Results and standings ==
=== Grands Prix ===
Round	Grand Prix	Pole position	Fastest lap	Winning rider	Winning team	Winning constructor	Report
1	Qatar motorcycle Grand Prix	(Spain) Marc Márquez	(Spain) Álvaro Bautista	(Spain) Marc Márquez	(Japan) Repsol Honda Team	(Japan) Honda	Report
2	(United States) Motorcycle Grand Prix of the Americas	(Spain) Marc Márquez	(Spain) Marc Márquez	(Spain) Marc Márquez	(Japan) Repsol Honda Team	(Japan) Honda	Report
3	(Argentina) Argentine Republic motorcycle Grand Prix	(Spain) Marc Márquez	(Spain) Dani Pedrosa	(Spain) Marc Márquez	(Japan) Repsol Honda Team	(Japan) Honda	Report
4	(Spain) Spanish motorcycle Grand Prix	(Spain) Marc Márquez	(Spain) Marc Márquez	(Spain) Marc Márquez	(Japan) Repsol Honda Team	(Japan) Honda	Report
5	(France) French motorcycle Grand Prix	(Spain) Marc Márquez	(Spain) Marc Márquez	(Spain) Marc Márquez	(Japan) Repsol Honda Team	(Japan) Honda	Report
6	(Italy) Italian motorcycle Grand Prix	(Spain) Marc Márquez	(Spain) Marc Márquez	(Spain) Marc Márquez	(Japan) Repsol Honda Team	(Japan) Honda	Report
7	(Catalonia) Catalan motorcycle Grand Prix	(Spain) Dani Pedrosa	(Spain) Marc Márquez	(Spain) Marc Márquez	(Japan) Repsol Honda Team	(Japan) Honda	Report
8	(Netherlands) Dutch TT	(Spain) Aleix Espargaró	(Spain) Marc Márquez	(Spain) Marc Márquez	(Japan) Repsol Honda Team	(Japan) Honda	Report
9	(Germany) German motorcycle Grand Prix	(Spain) Marc Márquez	(Spain) Marc Márquez	(Spain) Marc Márquez	(Japan) Repsol Honda Team	(Japan) Honda	Report
10	Indianapolis motorcycle Grand Prix	(Spain) Marc Márquez	(Spain) Marc Márquez	(Spain) Marc Márquez	(Japan) Repsol Honda Team	(Japan) Honda	Report
11	Czech Republic motorcycle Grand Prix	(Spain) Marc Márquez	(Spain) Dani Pedrosa	(Spain) Dani Pedrosa	(Japan) Repsol Honda Team	(Japan) Honda	Report
12	(United Kingdom) British motorcycle Grand Prix	(Spain) Marc Márquez	(Spain) Marc Márquez	(Spain) Marc Márquez	(Japan) Repsol Honda Team	(Japan) Honda	Report
13	San Marino and Rimini Riviera motorcycle Grand Prix	(Spain) Jorge Lorenzo	(Spain) Marc Márquez	(Italy) Valentino Rossi	(Japan) Movistar Yamaha MotoGP	(Japan) Yamaha	Report
14	Aragon motorcycle Grand Prix	(Spain) Marc Márquez	(Spain) Jorge Lorenzo	(Spain) Jorge Lorenzo	(Japan) Movistar Yamaha MotoGP	(Japan) Yamaha	Report
15	(Japan) Japanese motorcycle Grand Prix	(Italy) Andrea Dovizioso	(Spain) Jorge Lorenzo	(Spain) Jorge Lorenzo	(Japan) Movistar Yamaha MotoGP	(Japan) Yamaha	Report
16	(Australia) Australian motorcycle Grand Prix	(Spain) Marc Márquez	(Italy) Valentino Rossi	(Italy) Valentino Rossi	(Japan) Movistar Yamaha MotoGP	(Japan) Yamaha	Report
17	(Malaysia) Malaysian motorcycle Grand Prix	(Spain) Marc Márquez	(Spain) Marc Márquez	(Spain) Marc Márquez	(Japan) Repsol Honda Team	(Japan) Honda	Report
18	Valencian Community motorcycle Grand Prix	(Italy) Valentino Rossi	(Spain) Marc Márquez	(Spain) Marc Márquez	(Japan) Repsol Honda Team	(Japan) Honda	Report

=== Riders' standings ===
Scoring system

Points were awarded to the top fifteen finishers. A rider had to finish the race to earn points.

Position	**1st**	**2nd**	**3rd**	**4th**	**5th**	**6th**	**7th**	**8th**	**9th**	**10th**	**11th**	**12th**	**13th**	**14th**	**15th**
Points	25	20	16	13	11	10	9	8	7	6	5	4	3	2	1

Pos	Rider	Bike		Team	QAT (Qatar)	AME (United States)	ARG (Argentina)	SPA (Spain)	FRA (France)	ITA (Italy)	CAT (Catalonia)	NED (Netherlands)	GER (Germany)	INP (Indianapolis)	CZE (Czech Republic)	GBR (United Kingdom)	RSM (San Marino)	ARA (Aragon)	JPN (Japan)	AUS (Australia)	MAL (Malaysia)	VAL (Valencian Community)	Pts
1	(Spain) Marc Márquez	Honda		Repsol Honda Team	**1**	**1**	**1**	**1**	**1**	**1**	1	1	**1**	**1**	**4**	**1**	15	**13**	2	**Ret**	**1**	1	362
2	(Italy) Valentino Rossi	Yamaha		Movistar Yamaha MotoGP	2	8	4	2	2	3	2	5	4	3	3	3	1	Ret	3	1	2	**2**	295
3	(Spain) Jorge Lorenzo	Yamaha		Movistar Yamaha MotoGP	Ret	10	3	4	6	2	4	13	3	2	2	2	**2**	1	1	2	3	Ret	263
4	(Spain) Dani Pedrosa	Honda		Repsol Honda Team	3	2	2	3	5	4	**3**	3	2	4	1	4	3	14	4	Ret	Ret	3	246
5	(Italy) Andrea Dovizioso	Ducati		Ducati Team	5	3	9	5	8	6	8	2	8	7	6	5	4	Ret	**5**	4	8	4	187
6	(Spain) Pol Espargaró	Yamaha		Monster Yamaha Tech 3	Ret	6	8	9	4	5	7	Ret	7	5	Ret	6	6	6	8	Ret	6	6	136
7	(Spain) Aleix Espargaró	Forward Yamaha	Open	NGM Forward Racing	4	9	15	7	9	9	6	**4**	6	Ret	8	9	Ret	2	11	Ret	Ret	7	126
8	(United Kingdom) Bradley Smith	Yamaha		Monster Yamaha Tech 3	Ret	5	7	8	10	Ret	10	8	19	6	9	22	7	5	9	3	5	14	121
9	(Germany) Stefan Bradl	Honda		LCR Honda MotoGP	Ret	4	5	10	7	Ret	5	10	16	Ret	7	7	Ret	4	7	Ret	4	8	117
10	(Italy) Andrea Iannone	Ducati		Pramac Racing	10	7	6	Ret	Ret	7	9	6	5	Ret	5	8	5	Ret	6	Ret	DNS	22	102
11	(Spain) Álvaro Bautista	Honda		Go&Fun Honda Gresini	Ret	Ret	Ret	6	3	8	Ret	7	9	Ret	10	Ret	8	7	10	6	Ret	16	89
12	(United Kingdom) Scott Redding	Honda	Open	Go&Fun Honda Gresini	7	Ret	14	13	12	13	13	12	11	9	11	10	13	10	16	7	10	10	81
13	(United Kingdom) Cal Crutchlow	Ducati		Ducati Team	6	Ret		Ret	11	Ret	Ret	9	10	8	Ret	12	9	3	Ret	Ret	Ret	5	74
14	(Japan) Hiroshi Aoyama	Honda	Open	Drive M7 Aspar	11	12	10	12	14	14	15	16	12	10	13	14	12	8	13	8	11	15	68
15	(Colombia) Yonny Hernández	Ducati		Energy T.I. Pramac Racing	12	13	12	14	13	10	11	19	17	Ret	Ret	11	10	15	Ret	11	7	Ret	53
16	(United States) Nicky Hayden	Honda	Open	Drive M7 Aspar	8	11	11	11	Ret	DNS	12	17	14					9	14	10	Ret	13	47
17	(Czech Republic) Karel Abraham	Honda	Open	Cardion AB Motoracing	13	14	13	Ret	15	12	Ret	14	13	11	14	13	11	Ret	Ret	Ret	Ret	17	33
18	(Spain) Héctor Barberá	Avintia	Open	Avintia Racing	Ret	15	16	15	Ret	Ret	19	18	18	Ret	17	19	19						26
18	(Spain) Héctor Barberá	Ducati	Open	Avintia Racing														19	15	5	9	11	26
19	(Italy) Michele Pirro	Ducati		Ducati Team			17	Ret		11	14				12							9	18
20	(Italy) Danilo Petrucci	ART	Open	Octo IodaRacing Team	14	17	Ret	DNS				15	15	Ret	Ret	18	Ret	11	Ret	12	Ret	12	17
21	(San Marino) Alex de Angelis	Forward Yamaha	Open	NGM Forward Racing											16	15	14	12	17	9	Ret	18	14
22	(United States) Colin Edwards	Forward Yamaha	Open	NGM Forward Racing	9	Ret	20	Ret	17	15	18	22	20	13									11
23	(Australia) Broc Parkes	PBM	Open	Paul Bird Motorsport	15	Ret	21	17	18	17	16	11	21	15	19	21	18	18	20	Ret	14	20	9
24	(United Kingdom) Michael Laverty	PBM	Open	Paul Bird Motorsport	16	16	18	16	16	16	17	21	Ret	14	Ret	17	17	16	18	13	12	19	9
25	(France) Mike Di Meglio	Avintia	Open	Avintia Racing	17	18	19	Ret	19	18	Ret	20	22	12	18	20	Ret	17	19	14	13	21	9
26	(Japan) Katsuyuki Nakasuga	Yamaha		Yamalube Racing Team with YSP															12				4
27	(United Kingdom) Leon Camier	Honda	Open	Drive M7 Aspar										Ret	15	16	16						1
	(Italy) Michel Fabrizio	ART	Open	Octo IodaRacing Team						Ret	20												0
	(France) Randy de Puniet	Suzuki		Team Suzuki MotoGP																		Ret	0
Pos	Rider	Bike		Team	QAT (Qatar)	AME (United States)	ARG (Argentina)	SPA (Spain)	FRA (France)	ITA (Italy)	CAT (Catalonia)	NED (Netherlands)	GER (Germany)	INP (Indianapolis)	CZE (Czech Republic)	GBR (United Kingdom)	RSM (San Marino)	ARA (Aragon)	JPN (Japan)	AUS (Australia)	MAL (Malaysia)	VAL (Valencian Community)	Pts

Colour	Result
Gold	Winner
Silver	Second place
Bronze	Third place
Green	Points classification
Blue	Non-points classification
Blue	Non-classified finish (NC)
Purple	Retired, not classified (Ret)
Red	Did not qualify (DNQ)
Red	Did not pre-qualify (DNPQ)
Black	Disqualified (DSQ)
White	Did not start (DNS)
White	Withdrew (WD)
White	Race cancelled (C)
Blank	Did not practice (DNP)
Blank	Did not arrive (DNA)
Blank	Excluded (EX)

**Bold** – Pole
Italics – Fastest Lap
Light blue – Rookie

Icon	Class
**Open**	Open Entry

=== Constructors' standings ===
Each constructor received the same number of points as their best placed rider in each race.

Pos	Constructor	QAT (Qatar)	AME (United States)	ARG (Argentina)	SPA (Spain)	FRA (France)	ITA (Italy)	CAT (Catalonia)	NED (Netherlands)	GER (Germany)	INP (Indianapolis)	CZE (Czech Republic)	GBR (United Kingdom)	RSM (San Marino)	ARA (Aragon)	JPN (Japan)	AUS (Australia)	MAL (Malaysia)	VAL (Valencian Community)	Pts
1	(Japan) Honda	1	1	1	1	1	1	1	1	1	1	1	1	3	4	2	6	1	1	409
2	(Japan) Yamaha	2	5	3	2	2	2	2	5	3	2	2	2	1	1	1	1	2	2	354
3	(Italy) Ducati	5	3	6	5	8	6	8	2	5	7	5	5	4	3	5	4	7	4	211
4	(Switzerland) Forward Yamaha	4	9	15	7	9	9	6	4	6	13	8	9	14	2	11	9	Ret	7	138
5	(Italy) ART	14	17	Ret	DNS		Ret	20	15	15	Ret	Ret	18	Ret	11	Ret	12	Ret	12	17
6	(United Kingdom) PBM	15	16	18	16	16	16	16	11	21	14	19	17	17	16	18	13	12	19	15
7	(Spain) Avintia	17	15	16	15	19	18	19	18	18	12	17	19	19	17	19	14	13	21	11
	(Japan) Suzuki																		Ret	0
Pos	Constructor	QAT (Qatar)	AME (United States)	ARG (Argentina)	SPA (Spain)	FRA (France)	ITA (Italy)	CAT (Catalonia)	NED (Netherlands)	GER (Germany)	INP (Indianapolis)	CZE (Czech Republic)	GBR (United Kingdom)	RSM (San Marino)	ARA (Aragon)	JPN (Japan)	AUS (Australia)	MAL (Malaysia)	VAL (Valencian Community)	Pts

=== Teams' standings ===
The teams' standings were based on results obtained by regular and substitute riders; wild-card entries were ineligible.

Pos	Team	Bike No.	QAT (Qatar)	AME (United States)	ARG (Argentina)	SPA (Spain)	FRA (France)	ITA (Italy)	CAT (Catalonia)	NED (Netherlands)	GER (Germany)	INP (Indianapolis)	CZE (Czech Republic)	GBR (United Kingdom)	RSM (San Marino)	ARA (Aragon)	JPN (Japan)	AUS (Australia)	MAL (Malaysia)	VAL (Valencian Community)	Pts
1	(Japan) Repsol Honda Team	26	3	2	2	3	5	4	**3**	3	2	4	1	4	3	14	4	Ret	Ret	3	608
1	(Japan) Repsol Honda Team	93	**1**	**1**	**1**	**1**	**1**	**1**	1	1	**1**	**1**	**4**	**1**	15	**13**	2	**Ret**	**1**	1	608
2	(Japan) Movistar Yamaha MotoGP	46	2	8	4	2	2	3	2	5	4	3	3	3	1	Ret	3	1	2	**2**	558
2	(Japan) Movistar Yamaha MotoGP	99	Ret	10	3	4	6	2	4	13	3	2	2	2	**2**	1	1	2	3	Ret	558
3	(Italy) Ducati Team	04	5	3	9	5	8	6	8	2	8	7	6	5	4	Ret	**5**	4	8	4	261
3	(Italy) Ducati Team	35	6	Ret		Ret	11	Ret	Ret	9	10	8	Ret	12	9	3	Ret	Ret	Ret	5	261
3	(Italy) Ducati Team	51			17																261
4	(France) Monster Yamaha Tech 3	38	Ret	5	7	8	10	Ret	10	8	19	6	9	22	7	5	9	3	5	14	257
4	(France) Monster Yamaha Tech 3	44	Ret	6	8	9	4	5	7	Ret	7	5	Ret	6	6	6	8	Ret	6	6	257
5	(Italy) Go&Fun Honda Gresini	19	Ret	Ret	Ret	6	3	8	Ret	7	9	Ret	10	Ret	8	7	10	6	Ret	16	170
5	(Italy) Go&Fun Honda Gresini	45	7	Ret	14	13	12	13	13	12	11	9	11	10	13	10	16	7	10	10	170
6	(Italy) Pramac Racing	29	10	7	6	Ret	Ret	7	9	6	5	Ret	5	8	5	Ret	6	Ret	DNS	22	155
6	(Italy) Pramac Racing	68	12	13	12	14	13	10	11	19	17	Ret	Ret	11	10	15	Ret	11	7	Ret	155
7	(Switzerland) NGM Forward Racing	5	9	Ret	20	Ret	17	15	18	22	20	13									151
7	(Switzerland) NGM Forward Racing	15											16	15	14	12	17	9	Ret	18	151
7	(Switzerland) NGM Forward Racing	41	4	9	15	7	9	9	6	**4**	6	Ret	8	9	Ret	2	11	Ret	Ret	7	151
8	(Monaco) LCR Honda MotoGP	6	Ret	4	5	10	7	Ret	5	10	16	Ret	7	7	Ret	4	7	Ret	4	8	117
9	(Spain) Drive M7 Aspar	2										Ret	15	16	16						116
9	(Spain) Drive M7 Aspar	7	11	12	10	12	14	14	15	16	12	10	13	14	12	8	13	8	11	15	116
9	(Spain) Drive M7 Aspar	69	8	11	11	11	Ret	DNS	12	17	14					9	14	10	Ret	13	116
10	(Spain) Avintia Racing	8	Ret	15	16	15	Ret	Ret	19	18	18	Ret	17	19	19	19	15	5	9	11	35
10	(Spain) Avintia Racing	63	17	18	19	Ret	19	18	Ret	20	22	12	18	20	Ret	17	19	14	13	21	35
11	(Czech Republic) Cardion AB Motoracing	17	13	14	13	Ret	15	12	Ret	14	13	11	14	13	11	Ret	Ret	Ret	Ret	17	33
12	(United Kingdom) Paul Bird Motorsport	23	15	Ret	21	17	18	17	16	11	21	15	19	21	18	18	20	Ret	14	20	18
12	(United Kingdom) Paul Bird Motorsport	70	16	16	18	16	16	16	17	21	Ret	14	Ret	17	17	16	18	13	12	19	18
13	(Italy) Octo IodaRacing Team	9	14	17	Ret	DNS				15	15	Ret	Ret	18	Ret	11	Ret	12	Ret	12	17
13	(Italy) Octo IodaRacing Team	84						Ret	20												17
Pos	Team	Bike No.	QAT (Qatar)	AME (United States)	ARG (Argentina)	SPA (Spain)	FRA (France)	ITA (Italy)	CAT (Catalonia)	NED (Netherlands)	GER (Germany)	INP (Indianapolis)	CZE (Czech Republic)	GBR (United Kingdom)	RSM (San Marino)	ARA (Aragon)	JPN (Japan)	AUS (Australia)	MAL (Malaysia)	VAL (Valencian Community)	Pts
