= Honda RCV1000R =

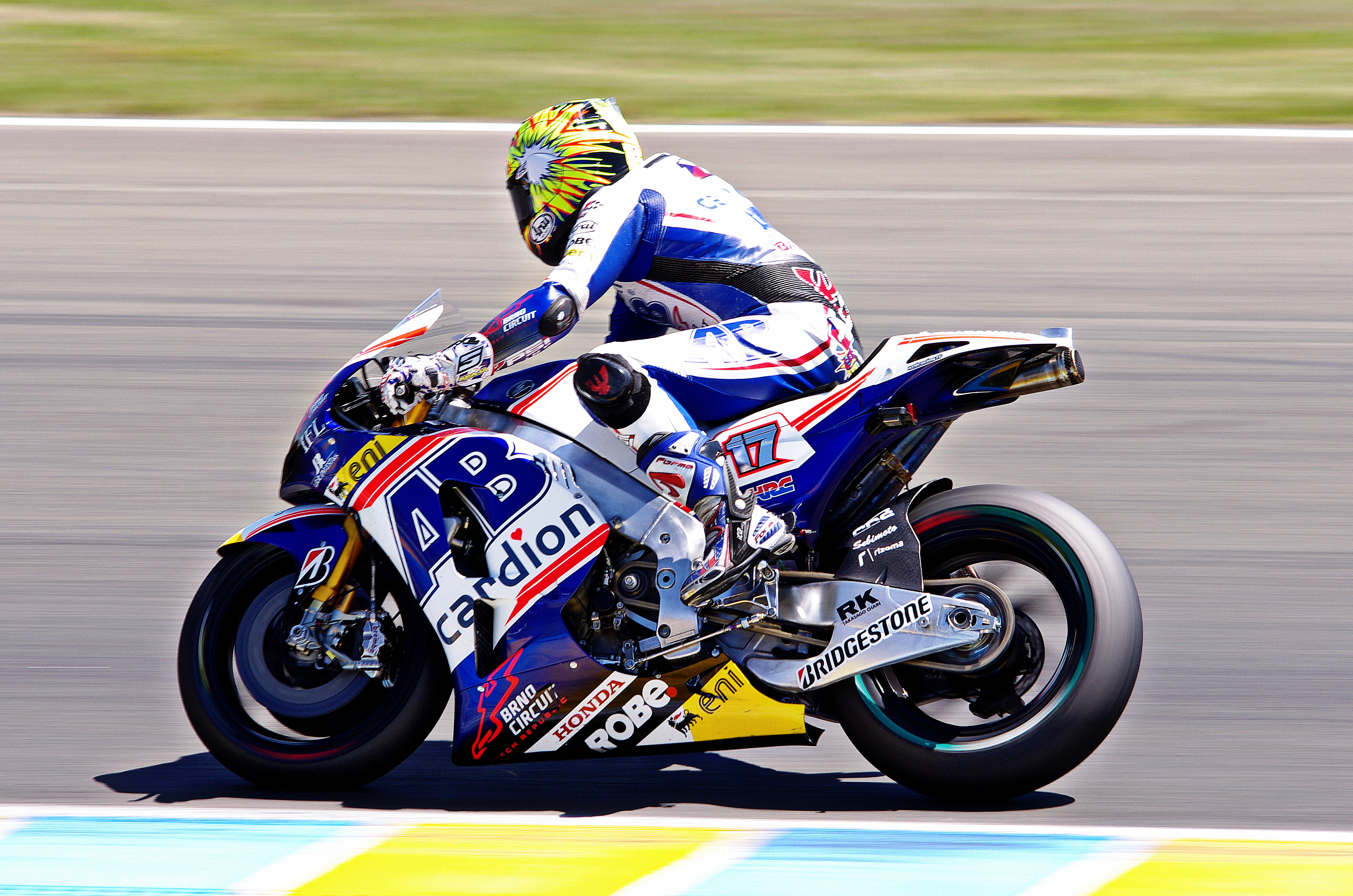
- Karel Abraham riding a Honda RCV1000R at Le Mans.
- Manufacturer: Honda Racing Corporation
- Production: 2013
- Engine: 1,000 cc (61 cu in) four-stroke V4
- Related: Honda RC213V

The Honda RCV1000R was a road racing motorcycle developed to race in the Open class of the MotoGP world championship for the 2014 season. It was basically a simplified "production racer" version of the RC213V that non-Motorcycle Sport Manufacturers Association (MSMA) teams could enter in the Open class.

The RCV1000R lasted only one season, being replaced by the newer Honda RC213V-RS in 2015.

== Features ==
The RCV1000R lacks the seamless shift gearbox and the pneumatic operated valves of the RC213V. It is less fuel-efficient, and will have a 23-litre fuel tank, less than the 24 litre maximum for the 2014 Open class but still significantly more than the 20 litre limit for the RC213V and the other 2014 bikes with “Factory” status.

Although the machine's geometry is nearly identical to that of the factory RC213V, its ECU uses the official DORNA-issued ECU software, as opposed to the RC213V's HRC-developed custom software. The RCV1000R's 90-degree V4 valve-spring engine produces more than 175 kW at 16000 rpm, with torque of 110 N· m, and is equipped with a conventional transmission. The package supplied to each rider includes 2 machines and 2 spare engines. Teams can conform to the Open class 12-engine regulation by maintaining the supplied engines through 12 cycles.

== Reviews ==
Following his first test of the 2014-spec RC213V and the RCV1000R, Casey Stoner described the latter as having "a similar feeling to the RCV but with a little less power and a different feeling in engine braking."

== Complete MotoGP results ==
(key) (results in bold indicate pole position; results in italics indicate fastest lap)

Year	Tyres	Team	#	Rider	1	2	3	4	5	6	7	8	9	10	11	12	13	14	15	16	17	18	Points	RC
2014	B				QAT	AME	ARG	ESP	FRA	ITA	CAT	NED	GER	IND	CZE	GBR	RSM	ARA	JPN	AUS	MAL	VAL		
2014	B	Drive M7 Aspar	7	Hiroshi Aoyama	11	12	10	12	14	14	15	16	12	10	13	14	12	8	13	8	11		**67 (68)**	**14th**
2014	B	Drive M7 Aspar	69	Nicky Hayden	8	11	11	11	Ret	DNS	12	17	14					9	14	10	Ret	13	**47**	**16th**
2014	B	Drive M7 Aspar	2	Leon Camier										Ret	15	16	16						**1**	**27th**
2014	B	Cardion AB Motoracing	17	Karel Abraham	13	14	13	Ret	15	12	Ret	14	13	11	14	13	11	Ret	Ret	Ret	Ret	17	**33**	**17th**
2014	B	Go&Fun Honda Gresini	45	Scott Redding	7	Ret	14	13	12	13	13	12	11	9	11	10	13	10	16	7	10	10	**81**	**12th**
