= AB Motoracing =

(Czech Republic) AB Motoracing
- 2015 name: AB Motoracing
- Base: Brno, Czech Republic
- Principal: Karel Abraham Sr.
- Rider(s): 17. (Czech Republic) Karel Abraham
- Motorcycle: Honda RC213V-RS
- Tyres: Bridgestone
- Riders' Championships: -

AB Motoracing, the trading name of Abraham Motor Racing s.r.o., was a motorcycle racing team from Czech Republic that competed in the MotoGP, Moto2, 250cc and 125cc World Championships.

== History ==
The team started racing in 2006 running Aprilia motorcycles in the 125cc class with Karel Abraham and in the 250cc class with Jakub Smrž. From 2007 to 2009, the team ran only one Aprilia with Abraham in 250cc. In 2010, Cardion AB Motoracing competed in the new Moto2 class, using RSV and FTR chassis. Abraham took his and his team's first victory in Valencia.

The team stepped up to MotoGP in 2011, having signed a contract with Ducati, which was later extended through 2012. For 2013 the team switched to an ART-Aprilia CRT bike.

The team was headed by Karel Abraham Sr., the owner of the Masaryk Circuit – which hosts the Czech Republic Grand Prix – and his son Karel Abraham was the only rider for the team, the first Czech team with a Czech rider in MotoGP.

== Results ==
=== Riders results ===
Year	Class	Bike	Riders	Races	Wins	Podiums	Poles	F. laps	Points	Pos.
2006	125cc	Aprilia	(Czech Republic) Karel Abraham	16	0	0	0	0	8	24th
2006	250cc	Aprilia	(Czech Republic) Jakub Smrž	16	0	0	0	0	58	12th
2007	250cc	Aprilia	(Czech Republic) Karel Abraham	17	0	0	0	0	31	16th
2008	250cc	Aprilia	(Czech Republic) Karel Abraham	15	0	0	0	0	40	16th
2009	250cc	Aprilia	(Czech Republic) Karel Abraham	16	0	0	0	0	74	14th
2010	Moto2	RSV	(Czech Republic) Karel Abraham	2	0	0	0	0	96	10th
2010	Moto2	FTR	(Czech Republic) Karel Abraham	12	1	2	0	1	96	10th
2011	MotoGP	Ducati	(Czech Republic) Karel Abraham	16	0	0	0	0	64	14th
2012	MotoGP	Ducati	(Czech Republic) Karel Abraham	16	0	0	0	0	59	14th
2012	MotoGP	Ducati	(Italy) Franco Battaini	1	0	0	0	0	0	NC
2013	MotoGP	ART	(Czech Republic) Karel Abraham	9	0	0	0	0	5	23rd
2013	MotoGP	ART	(Italy) Luca Scassa	5	0	0	0	0	0	NC
2014	MotoGP	Honda	(Czech Republic) Karel Abraham	18	0	0	0	0	33	17th
2015	MotoGP	Honda	(Czech Republic) Karel Abraham	10	0	0	0	0	0	NC
2015	MotoGP	Honda	(Japan) Hiroshi Aoyama	1 (4) (Note: Non-bracketed number refers to the number accumulated with team, with number in brackets referring to the total accumulated for the season.)	0	0	0	0	0 (5)	25th
2015	MotoGP	Honda	(Spain) Toni Elías	1 (6)	0	0	0	0	0 (2)	27th
2015	MotoGP	Honda	(Japan) Kousuke Akiyoshi	1	0	0	0	0	0	NC
2015	MotoGP	Honda	(Australia) Anthony West	3	0	0	0	0	0	NC

=== Team results ===
(key) (Races in bold indicate pole position; races in italics indicate fastest lap)

Year	Bike	Tyres	Riders	1	2	3	4	5	6	7	8	9	10	11	12	13	14	15	16	17	18	Points	Pos.
2011	Ducati Desmosedici	B		QAT	ESP	POR	FRA	CAT	GBR	NED	ITA	GER	USA	CZE	IND	RSM	ARA	JPN	AUS	MAL	VAL	64	9th
2011	Ducati Desmosedici	B	(Czech Republic) Karel Abraham	13	7	Ret	10	10	7	Ret	12	12	11	Ret	Ret	12	Ret	DNS	10	C	8	64	9th
2012	Ducati Desmosedici	B		QAT	ESP	POR	FRA	CAT	GBR	NED	GER	ITA	USA	IND	CZE	RSM	ARA	JPN	MAL	AUS	VAL	59	9th
2012	Ducati Desmosedici	B	(Czech Republic) Karel Abraham	Ret	17	Ret	Ret	12	WD	DNS			10	8	9	Ret	9	11	10	9	7	59	9th
2012	Ducati Desmosedici	B	(Italy) Franco Battaini								16											59	9th
2013	ART GP13	B		QAT	AME	ESP	FRA	ITA	CAT	NED	GER	USA	IND	CZE	GBR	RSM	ARA	MAL	AUS	JPN	VAL	5	13th
2013	ART GP13	B	(Czech Republic) Karel Abraham	Ret	DNS	DNS	15	15	Ret	15	18	14	DNS	19		Ret						5	13th
2013	ART GP13	B	(Italy) Luca Scassa														17	17	16	Ret	18	5	13th
2014	Honda RCV1000R	B		QAT	AME	ARG	ESP	FRA	ITA	CAT	NED	GER	IND	CZE	GBR	RSM	ARA	JPN	AUS	MAL	VAL	33	11th
2014	Honda RCV1000R	B	(Czech Republic) Karel Abraham	13	14	13	Ret	15	12	Ret	14	13	11	14	13	11	Ret	Ret	Ret	Ret	17	33	11th
2015	Honda RC213V-RS	B		QAT	AME	ARG	ESP	FRA	ITA	CAT	NED	GER	IND	CZE	GBR	RSM	ARA	JPN	AUS	MAL	VAL	0	NC
2015	Honda RC213V-RS	B	(Czech Republic) Karel Abraham	Ret	Ret	21	Ret	Ret	17	DNS				21	19	21	Ret					0	NC
2015	Honda RC213V-RS	B	(Japan) Hiroshi Aoyama									Ret										0	NC
2015	Honda RC213V-RS	B	(Spain) Toni Elías										22									0	NC
2015	Honda RC213V-RS	B	(Japan) Kousuke Akiyoshi															19				0	NC
2015	Honda RC213V-RS	B	(Australia) Anthony West																23	20	22	0	NC
