= 2016 Motorcycle Grand Prix of the Americas =

(United States) 2016 Grand Prix of the Americas
Race details
- Race 3 of 18 races in the 2016 Grand Prix motorcycle racing season
- Date: April 10, 2016
- Official name: Red Bull Grand Prix of the Americas
- Location: Circuit of the Americas
- Course: Permanent racing facility; 5.513 km (3.426 mi)

MotoGP
Pole position
Rider	(Spain) Marc Márquez	Honda
Time	2:03.188	
Fastest lap
Rider	(Spain) Marc Márquez	Honda
Time	2:04.682 on lap 11	
Podium
First	(Spain) Marc Márquez	Honda
Second	(Spain) Jorge Lorenzo	Yamaha
Third	(Italy) Andrea Iannone	Ducati

Moto2
Pole position
Rider	(Spain) Álex Rins	Kalex
Time	2:08.850	
Fastest lap
Rider	(United Kingdom) Sam Lowes	Kalex
Time	2:09.994 on lap 2	
Podium
First	(Spain) Álex Rins	Kalex
Second	(United Kingdom) Sam Lowes	Kalex
Third	(France) Johann Zarco	Kalex

Moto3
Pole position
Rider	(Germany) Philipp Öttl	KTM
Time	2:18.398	
Fastest lap
Rider	(Italy) Romano Fenati	KTM
Time	2:16.842 on lap 6	
Podium
First	(Italy) Romano Fenati	KTM
Second	(Spain) Jorge Navarro	Honda
Third	(South Africa) Brad Binder	KTM

The 2016 Motorcycle Grand Prix of the Americas was the third round of the 2016 MotoGP season. It was held at the Circuit of the Americas in Austin on April 10, 2016.

== Classification ==
=== MotoGP ===
Pos.	No.	Rider	Team	Manufacturer	Laps	Time/Retired	Grid	Points
1	93	(Spain) Marc Márquez	Repsol Honda Team	Honda	21	43:57.945	1	25
2	99	(Spain) Jorge Lorenzo	Movistar Yamaha MotoGP	Yamaha	21	+6.107	2	20
3	29	(Italy) Andrea Iannone	Ducati Team	Ducati	21	+10.947	7	16
4	25	(Spain) Maverick Viñales	Team Suzuki Ecstar	Suzuki	21	+18.422	4	13
5	41	(Spain) Aleix Espargaró	Team Suzuki Ecstar	Suzuki	21	+20.711	9	11
6	45	(United Kingdom) Scott Redding	Octo Pramac Yakhnich	Ducati	21	+28.961	10	10
7	44	(Spain) Pol Espargaró	Monster Yamaha Tech 3	Yamaha	21	+32.112	13	9
8	51	(Italy) Michele Pirro	Octo Pramac Yakhnich	Ducati	21	+32.757	17	8
9	8	(Spain) Héctor Barberá	Avintia Racing	Ducati	21	+34.592	14	7
10	6	(Germany) Stefan Bradl	Aprilia Racing Team Gresini	Aprilia	21	+40.211	16	6
11	19	(Spain) Álvaro Bautista	Aprilia Racing Team Gresini	Aprilia	21	+45.423	19	5
12	50	(Republic of Ireland) Eugene Laverty	Aspar Team MotoGP	Ducati	21	+47.127	15	4
13	53	(Spain) Tito Rabat	Estrella Galicia 0,0 Marc VDS	Honda	21	+47.426	20	3
14	68	(Colombia) Yonny Hernández	Aspar Team MotoGP	Ducati	21	+51.190	18	2
15	76	(France) Loris Baz	Avintia Racing	Ducati	21	+1:12.929	12	1
16	35	(United Kingdom) Cal Crutchlow	LCR Honda	Honda	21	+1:19.252	5	
17	38	(United Kingdom) Bradley Smith	Monster Yamaha Tech 3	Yamaha	21	+1:28.036	11	
Ret	26	(Spain) Dani Pedrosa	Repsol Honda Team	Honda	11	Accident Damage	8	
Ret	4	(Italy) Andrea Dovizioso	Ducati Team	Ducati	6	Accident	6	
Ret	46	(Italy) Valentino Rossi	Movistar Yamaha MotoGP	Yamaha	2	Accident	3	
DNS	43	(Australia) Jack Miller	Estrella Galicia 0,0 Marc VDS	Honda		Did not start		

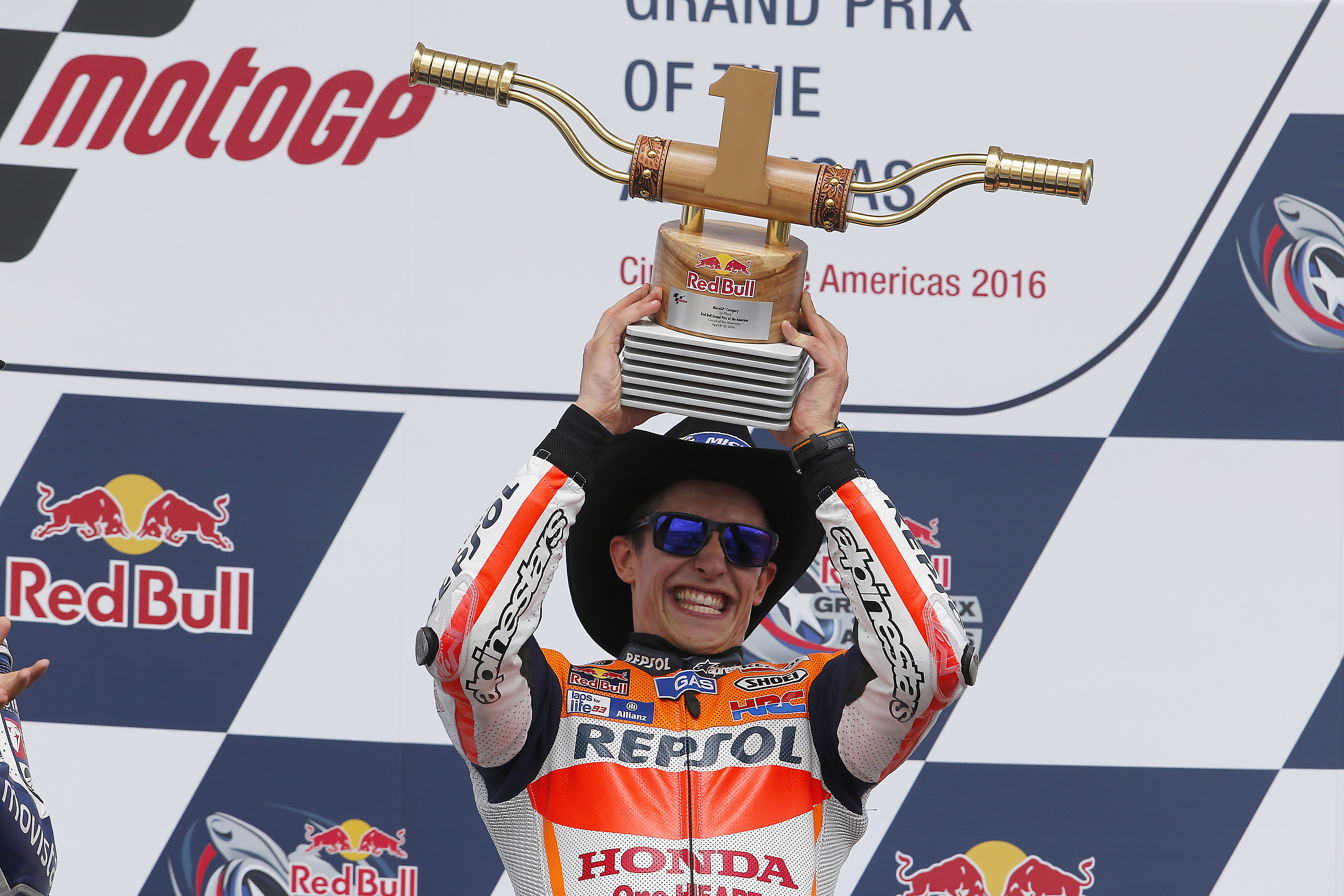
Marc Márquez, holding his first-place trophy on the podium after winning the MotoGP race.

=== Moto2 ===
Pos.	No.	Rider	Manufacturer	Laps	Time/Retired	Grid	Points
1	40	(Spain) Álex Rins	Kalex	19	41:22.174	1	25
2	22	(United Kingdom) Sam Lowes	Kalex	19	+2.091	3	20
3	5	(France) Johann Zarco	Kalex	19	+7.737	2	16
4	77	(Switzerland) Dominique Aegerter	Kalex	19	+8.646	4	13
5	94	(Germany) Jonas Folger	Kalex	19	+8.791	7	11
6	24	(Italy) Simone Corsi	Speed Up	19	+11.083	8	10
7	12	(Switzerland) Thomas Lüthi	Kalex	19	+11.278	5	9
8	19	(Belgium) Xavier Siméon	Speed Up	19	+17.933	18	8
9	60	(Spain) Julián Simón	Speed Up	19	+18.718	11	7
10	23	(Germany) Marcel Schrötter	Kalex	19	+19.408	13	6
11	73	(Spain) Álex Márquez	Kalex	19	+22.173	21	5
12	11	(Germany) Sandro Cortese	Kalex	19	+23.898	10	4
13	39	(Spain) Luis Salom	Kalex	19	+25.395	14	3
14	21	(Italy) Franco Morbidelli	Kalex	19	+26.883	9	2
15	30	(Japan) Takaaki Nakagami	Kalex	19	+27.598	6	1
16	55	(Malaysia) Hafizh Syahrin	Kalex	19	+29.341	17	
17	54	(Italy) Mattia Pasini	Kalex	19	+30.197	19	
18	32	(Spain) Isaac Viñales	Tech 3	19	+36.863	25	
19	14	(Thailand) Ratthapark Wilairot	Kalex	19	+38.383	24	
20	97	(Spain) Xavi Vierge	Tech 3	19	+38.437	23	
21	2	(Switzerland) Jesko Raffin	Kalex	19	+45.206	26	
22	49	(Spain) Axel Pons	Kalex	19	+47.688	15	
23	7	(Italy) Lorenzo Baldassarri	Kalex	19	+53.873	12	
24	33	(Italy) Alessandro Tonucci	Kalex	19	+1:11.159	28	
Ret	44	(Portugal) Miguel Oliveira	Kalex	11	Accident Damage	20	
Ret	52	(United Kingdom) Danny Kent	Kalex	5	Clutch	16	
Ret	70	(Switzerland) Robin Mulhauser	Kalex	3	Accident	27	
Ret	10	(Italy) Luca Marini	Kalex	3	Accident	22	
DNS	8	(Spain) Efrén Vázquez	Suter		Did not start		
OFFICIAL MOTO2 REPORT

=== Moto3 ===
Pos.	No.	Rider	Manufacturer	Laps	Time/Retired	Grid	Points
1	5	(Italy) Romano Fenati	KTM	18	41:14.868	5	25
2	9	(Spain) Jorge Navarro	Honda	18	+6.612	2	20
3	41	(South Africa) Brad Binder	KTM	18	+10.535	12	16
4	65	(Germany) Philipp Öttl	KTM	18	+10.975	1	13
5	55	(Italy) Andrea Locatelli	KTM	18	+13.845	7	11
6	33	(Italy) Enea Bastianini	Honda	18	+14.123	3	10
7	44	(Spain) Arón Canet	Honda	18	+16.309	22	9
8	11	(Belgium) Livio Loi	Honda	18	+21.841	10	8
9	95	(France) Jules Danilo	Honda	18	+22.004	8	7
10	8	(Italy) Nicolò Bulega	KTM	18	+22.351	11	6
11	84	(Czech Republic) Jakub Kornfeil	Honda	18	+22.714	4	5
12	58	(Spain) Juan Francisco Guevara	KTM	18	+22.764	14	4
13	20	(France) Fabio Quartararo	KTM	18	+26.024	9	3
14	21	(Italy) Francesco Bagnaia	Mahindra	18	+28.161	18	2
15	16	(Italy) Andrea Migno	KTM	18	+28.259	21	1
16	10	(France) Alexis Masbou	Peugeot	18	+39.223	15	
17	4	(Italy) Fabio Di Giannantonio	Honda	18	+39.348	31	
18	19	(Argentina) Gabriel Rodrigo	KTM	18	+39.739	24	
19	24	(Japan) Tatsuki Suzuki	Mahindra	18	+40.160	13	
20	89	(Malaysia) Khairul Idham Pawi	Honda	18	+48.107	32	
21	17	(United Kingdom) John McPhee	Peugeot	18	+48.334	17	
22	64	(Netherlands) Bo Bendsneyder	KTM	18	+48.442	23	
23	6	(Spain) María Herrera	KTM	18	+1:15.871	25	
24	77	(Italy) Lorenzo Petrarca	Mahindra	18	+1:16.043	28	
25	76	(Japan) Hiroki Ono	Honda	18	+1:19.441	16	
26	3	(Italy) Fabio Spiranelli	Mahindra	18	+1:45.929	33	
Ret	23	(Italy) Niccolò Antonelli	Honda	16	Accident	30	
Ret	98	(Czech Republic) Karel Hanika	Mahindra	11	Accident Damage	19	
Ret	43	(Italy) Stefano Valtulini	Mahindra	9	Retirement	26	
Ret	88	(Spain) Jorge Martín	Mahindra	7	Accident Damage	20	
Ret	40	(South Africa) Darryn Binder	Mahindra	5	Collision Damage	29	
Ret	36	(Spain) Joan Mir	KTM	4	Collision Damage	27	
Ret	7	(Malaysia) Adam Norrodin	Honda	1	Accident	6	
OFFICIAL MOTO3 REPORT

== Championship standings after the race (MotoGP) ==
Below are the standings for the top five riders and constructors after round three has concluded.

Riders' Championship standings

Pos.	Rider	Points
1	(Spain) Marc Marquez	66
2	(Spain) Jorge Lorenzo	45
3	(Italy) Valentino Rossi	33
4	(Spain) Pol Espargaro	28
5	(Spain) Dani Pedrosa	27

Constructors' Championship standings

Pos.	Constructor	Points
1	(Japan) Honda	66
2	(Japan) Yamaha	65
3	(Italy) Ducati	49
4	(Japan) Suzuki	28
5	(Italy) Aprilia	18

- Note: Only the top five positions are included for both sets of standings.

Previous race: 2016 Argentine Grand Prix	FIM Grand Prix World Championship; 2016 season	Next race: 2016 Spanish Grand Prix
Previous race: 2015 Grand Prix of the Americas	Motorcycle Grand Prix of the Americas	Next race: 2017 Grand Prix of the Americas
