= Miguel Oliveira =

Portuguese motorcycle racer (born 1995)

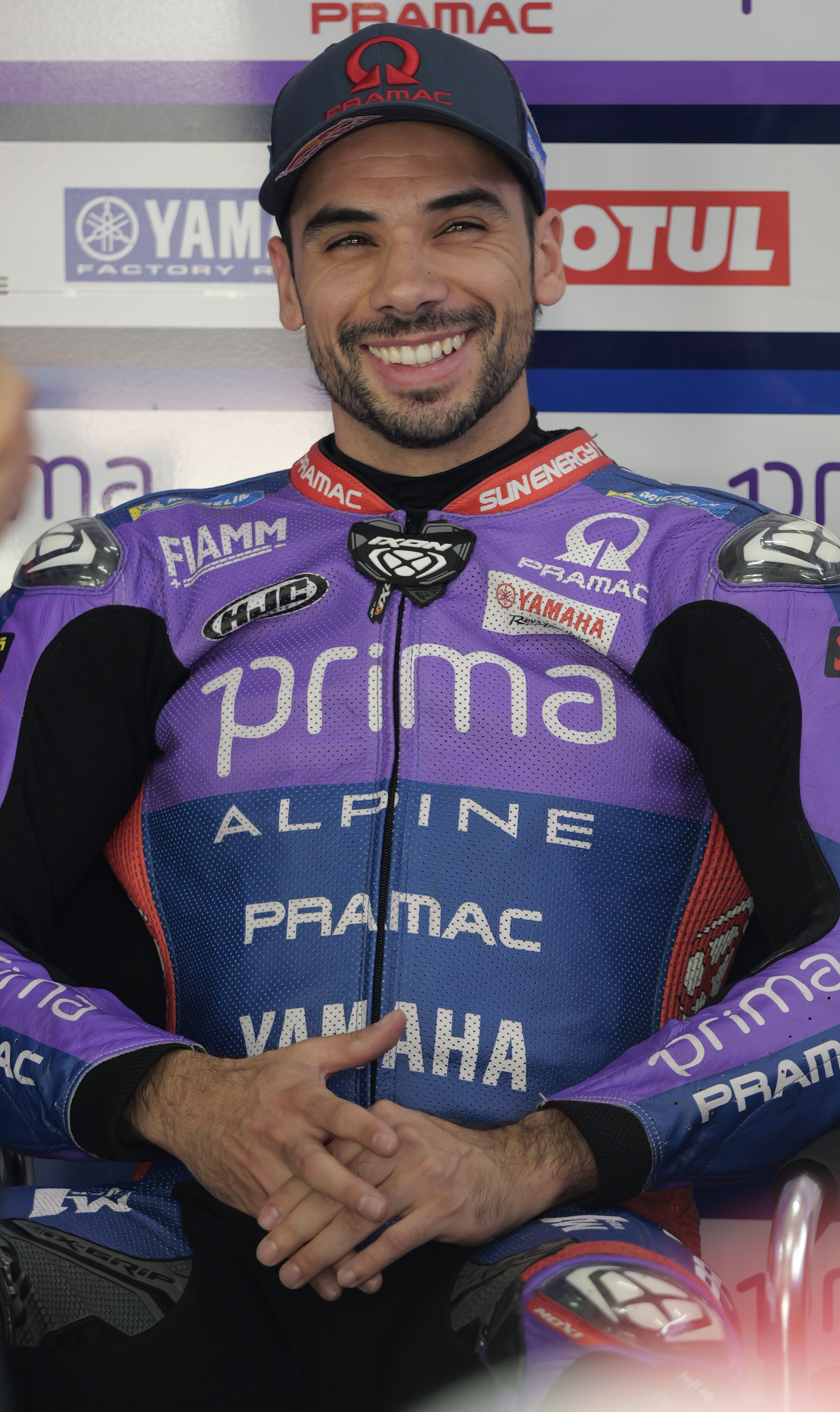
- Oliveira at the 2025 Malaysian Grand Prix
- Nationality: Portuguese
- Born: 4 January 1995 (age 31); Almada, Portugal
- Current team: ROKiT BMW Motorrad WorldSBK Team
- Bike number: 88
- Website: oliveira88.com
Motorcycle racing career statistics
MotoGP World Championship
Active years	2019–2025
Manufacturers	KTM (2019–2022); Aprilia (2023–2024); Yamaha (2025)
Championships	0
2025 championship position	20th (43 pts)
Starts / Wins / Podiums / Poles / F. laps / Points; 117 / 5 / 7 / 1 / 2 / 595
Moto2 World Championship
Active years	2016–2018
Manufacturers	Kalex (2016); KTM (2017–2018)
Championships	0
2018 championship position	2nd (297 pts)
Starts / Wins / Podiums / Poles / F. laps / Points; 50 / 6 / 21 / 2 / 4 / 574
Moto3 World Championship
Active years	2012–2015
Manufacturers	Suter Honda (2012); Mahindra (2013–2014); KTM (2015)
Championships	0
2015 championship position	2nd (254 pts)
Starts / Wins / Podiums / Poles / F. laps / Points; 68 / 6 / 13 / 2 / 6 / 628
125cc World Championship
Active years	2011
Manufacturers	Aprilia
Championships	0
2011 championship position	14th (44 pts)
Starts / Wins / Podiums / Poles / F. laps / Points; 11 / 0 / 0 / 0 / 0 / 44
Superbike World Championship
Active years	2026–
Manufacturers	BMW
Championships	0
2026 championship position	11th (142 pts)
Starts / Wins / Podiums / Poles / F. laps / Points; 29 / 0 / 4 / 0 / 0 / 142

Miguel Ângelo Falcão de Oliveira (pronounced [miˈɣɛl ɔliˈvɐjɾɐ]; born 4 January 1995) is a Portuguese professional motorcycle racer who competes in the Superbike World Championship for BMW Motorrad. He previously competed in the MotoGP World Championship for Prima Pramac Yamaha MotoGP, getting the step up from KTM Tech3, a satellite team, for whom he secured both the team's, and his, first and second win.

Oliveira finished as runner-up in the 2018 Moto2 World Championship. He gained extensive experience in Moto3, having competed for the Estrella Galicia 0,0 team in 2012, the Mahindra Racing team in 2013 and 2014 and finishing runner-up with the Red Bull KTM Ajo team in 2015. At the 2015 Italian motorcycle Grand Prix, Oliveira achieved the first World Championship victory for a Portuguese rider.

Oliveira's father, a former motorcycle racer, gave him a quad-bike when he was four years old. He started racing in the national championship at nine years old, in the Portuguese MiniGP Championship in 2004, winning the Young Promise of the Year award in Portugal. His first successes came in 2005 when he won the Portuguese MiniGP Championship and Metrakit World Festival in Spain. In 2006 he repeated his earlier success and in 2007 he won the Mediterranean PreGP 125 Trophy. In 2009 he was third in the Spanish championship, and in 2010 battled Maverick Viñales for the title, eventually finishing runner-up by two points and progressed to become the first full-time Portuguese rider to reach the world championship. Since then, he has become a race winner in all three classes.

== Career ==
=== 125cc/Moto3 World Championship ===
==== Andalucia Banca Civica (2011) ====
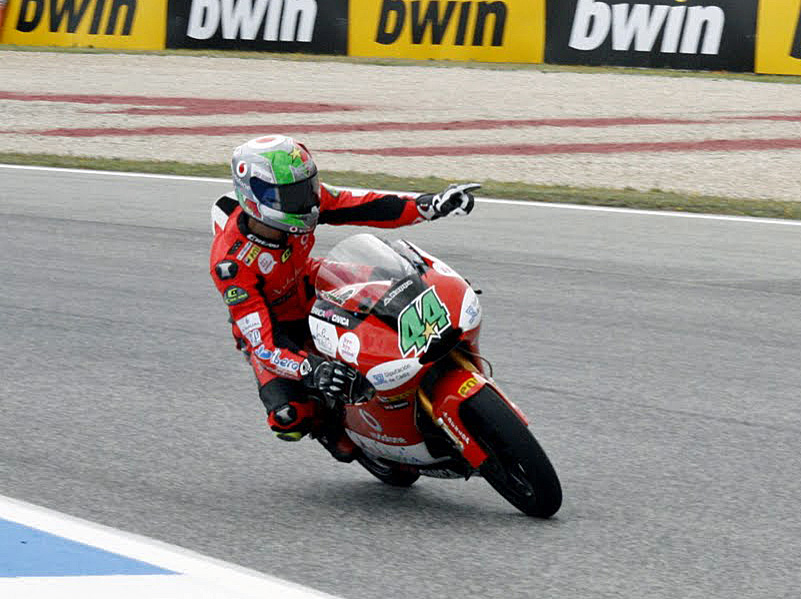
Oliveira at the 2011 Portuguese Grand Prix

2011 was Oliveira's first season in Motorcycling Grand Prix, in the 125cc Championship with Andalucía-Cajasol team. The bike was an Aprilia. His best result was a seventh place at his home race at Estoril, having finished tenth on his début in Qatar. He achieved six top-ten finishes in his first season, but did not compete in the final races after the team failed to secure financial support to end the season.

==== Estrella Galicia 0,0 (2012) ====
Oliveira moved to Moto3 machinery with Emilio Alzamora's Estrella Galicia 0,0 team for 2012, having helped to develop the new four-stroke Suter-Honda bike in the last rounds of the CEV 2011 season; winning two races in the process. In 2012, he led some races before crashing out and got his first podium, a third place, in Catalunya. He improved on that result with a second place in Australia, and ended the season in eighth place in the championship standings. As the team already had a contract with Álex Márquez to partner Álex Rins in 2013, Oliveira left the team. Despite offers from the Ajo Motorsport and Avintia Racing teams, Oliveira joined Mahindra Racing for 2013.

==== Mahindra Racing (2013–2014) ====
Oliveira was once again developing a new bike with Suter, with a Mahindra-badged engine – based on 2012's Honda unit – and he got the first podium for the Indian team in Sepang, with a third-place finish. He also achieved a pole position, eight top-five finishes and three fastest laps with the new bike that was underpowered compared to the KTM machinery.

For 2014, Oliveira was joined by Arthur Sissis – who was later replaced by Andrea Migno due to poor results – and he obtained a podium in Assen, a third place. He finished the season as the best Mahindra rider in the championship, in tenth place.

==== Red Bull KTM Ajo (2015) ====
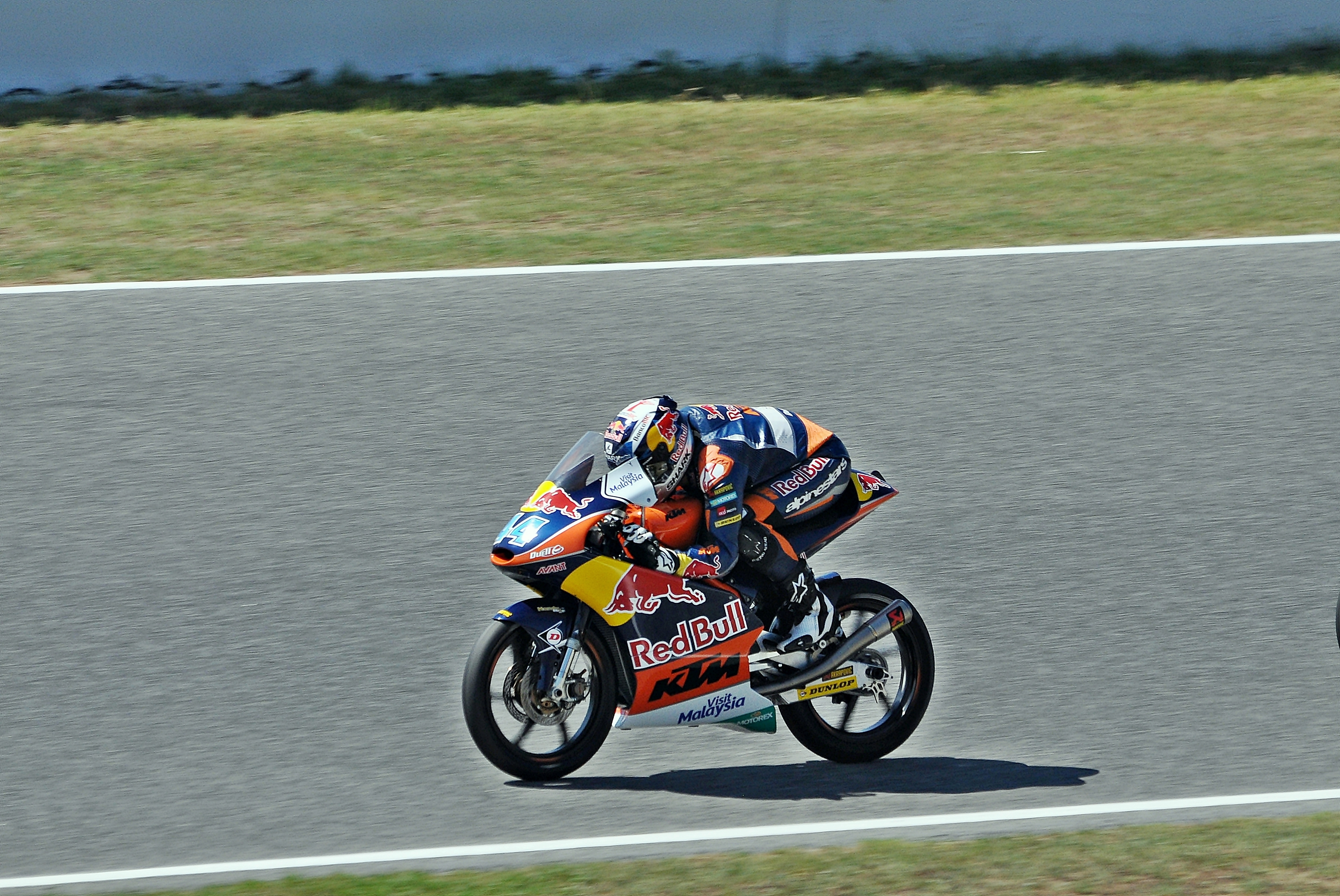
Oliveira at the 2015 Catalan Grand Prix

After joining the Red Bull KTM Ajo team, Oliveira became the first Portuguese rider to win a motorcycle Grand Prix with a victory at Mugello. After taking a second victory in three races, at Assen, Oliveira suffered a heavy crash during the first practice session of the following Grand Prix in Germany which forced him to withdraw from the race due to a broken and displaced metacarpal in the left hand. Returning from injury in Indianapolis, his best result in the following three races was an eighth-place finish at Brno. With only six races remaining in the season, Oliveira trailed championship leader Danny Kent by 110 points. Oliveira finished second at Misano, before winning at Aragon; he also pulled 35 points back on Kent over the two races. Another 35 points were pulled back on Kent, as Oliveira continued his top-two streak with second in Japan, and a victory at Phillip Island. The victory also stopped Kent from clinching the title – Oliveira trailed Kent by 40 points with 50 points available, and was the only rider that could catch Kent in the standings. Oliveira won again in Malaysia, and with Kent finishing seventh, Oliveira kept the title race alive heading to the final round in Valencia – 24 points behind, with 25 points available. Oliveira won the race, but with Kent finishing ninth after a three-rider collision in the last corner, Oliveira fell six points short.

=== Moto2 World Championship ===
==== Leopard Racing (2016) ====
On 13 September 2015, it was announced that Oliveira would be moving up to the Moto2 class for the 2016 season, with Leopard Racing. He was joined in the team by his Moto3 championship rival Danny Kent. Oliveira achieved three top-ten results with a ninth place in Le Mans, eighth place in Catalunya and another ninth place in Brno, before breaking his collarbone after a collision with Franco Morbidelli during practice for the Aragon Grand Prix. Morbidelli was later penalized for the crash with Oliveira missing out on the race. He returned for the Japanese Grand Prix and was initially declared fit by the medical team, but eventually did not start the race after assessing his condition during free practice. In consultation with the team, it was later decided that Oliveira would also not start in the following races at Phillip Island and Sepang, where he was replaced by Alessandro Nocco. Before the Aragon crash, Oliveira had been comfortably leading the standings for Rookie of the Year throughout the season and he was behind by only one point after missing four races and returning for the final race of the year in Valencia. He finished the race in a commendable 13th place, but fell short of clinching the trophy by a single point with eventual Rookie of the Year Xavi Vierge finishing just ahead of him in 12th place.

==== Red Bull KTM Ajo (2017–2018) ====
===== 2017 =====
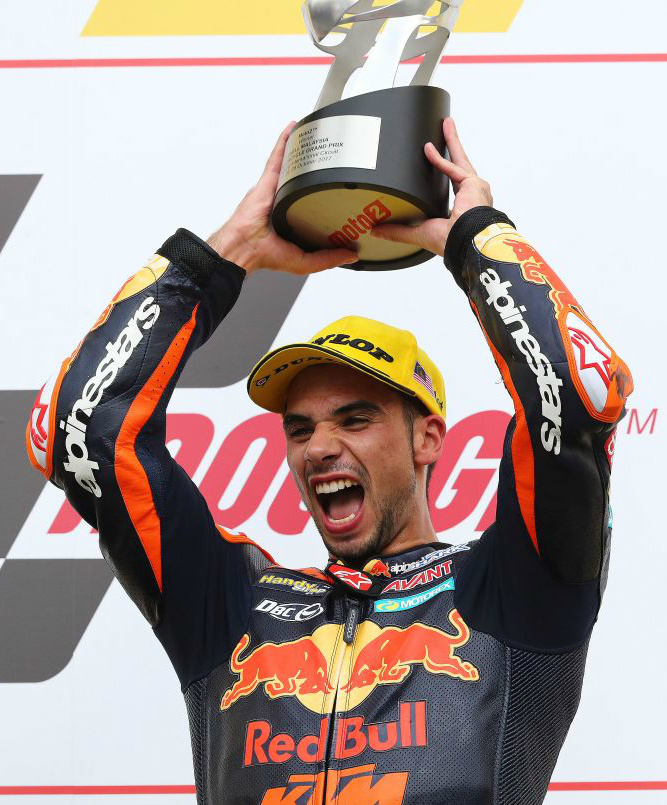
Oliveira at the 2017 Malaysian Grand Prix

For the 2017 season, Oliveira returned to the Red Bull KTM Ajo team with KTM making their debut in the Moto2 class. On his return to the team, he partnered his former Moto3 teammate Brad Binder. On 22 October, he achieved his first win in Moto2 and by doing so the first victory ever for KTM on the class. Oliveira also won the following race at Malaysia and closed the season with three consecutive wins. He finished in third place of the riders' championship

===== 2018 =====
Oliveira remained with Red Bull KTM Ajo for 2018. He had a strong season from the off, achieving three wins, podium finishes in all but six of 18 races and only one finish outside the top-ten. During the Spanish GP weekend, it was announced he was selected to move to MotoGP the following season, riding for KTM's new satellite team Tech3. Oliviera finished in second place of the riders' championship, merely nine points behind champion Francesco Bagnaia.

=== MotoGP World Championship ===
==== Red Bull KTM Tech3 (2019–2020) ====
===== 2019 =====
Oliveira joined French team Tech3 as they switched to KTM satellite machinery for 2019. He managed nine points finishes from the 16 races which he started. He sustained an injury in a crash with fellow KTM rider Johann Zarco at the British Grand Prix and further aggravated the injury with a free practice crash in Australia. Oliveira ultimately withdrew from the final three races of the season to undergo surgery on his shoulder. He finished the season with 33 points in 17th place, well ahead of Tech3 teammate Hafizh Syahrin.

===== 2020 =====
After Zarco's premature disembarkment from the KTM factory team, his seat for 2020 was offered to Oliveira who turned it down, electing to remain with Tech3 for a further season as planned. The factory seat ultimately went to Brad Binder, Oliveira's former Ajo teammate and originally-planned teammate at Tech3 for 2020. During the delayed start to the 2020 season, Oliveira's 2020 season got off to a rough start, after two separate retirements caused by collisions with factory KTM riders in the first four rounds. At the Andalusian round after qualifying in fifth as the best KTM rider, Oliveira was struck by Binder in a racing incident in the first corner of the opening lap, knocking Oliveira out of the race. At the Austrian round, Oliveira collided with KTM factory rider Pol Espargaró when both went wide in turn 4, sending both into the gravel trap and retirement from the race. At the Styrian race, Oliveira started the final lap in third place, but ultimately took his maiden win with a final corner overtake of Espargaró and Jack Miller, who both went wide battling for first. The victory marked the first win for Tech3 in MotoGP and the first win ever for a Portuguese rider in the top class. After another five top-six finishes in the second half of the season, Oliveira took his maiden MotoGP pole at the final round in Portimão and led from start to finish to claim his second win of the year. He ultimately finished ninth in the Championship, with 125 points.

==== Red Bull KTM Factory Racing (2021–2022) ====
===== 2021 =====
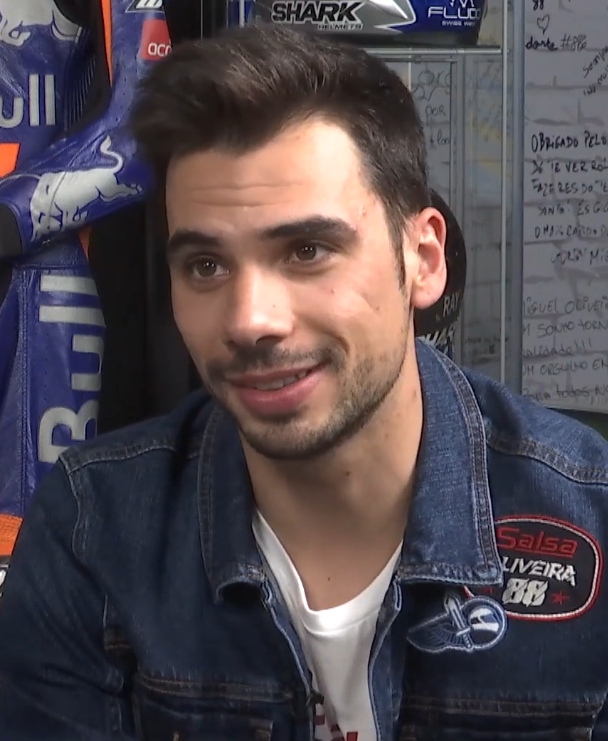
Oliveira in 2021

In 2021, Red Bull KTM Factory Racing revealed their 2021 line-up with Oliveira partnering Brad Binder once again in his career. Oliveira had a difficult start in the first five races of the season, with no top-ten finishes and a DNF that put him in an early points deficit. KTM introduced a new chassis after the French Grand Prix and Oliveira's results improved dramatically, with two podium finishes and a win at Catalunya over a three race stretch. At the end, he finished 14th in the Championship, with 94 points.

===== 2022 =====
In 2022, Oliveira finished tenth in the standings with 149 points, scoring wins in the rain-affected races in Indonesia and Thailand.

==== RNF MotoGP Team (2023) ====
In August 2022, Oliveira signed with RNF Racing for 2023, partnering Raúl Fernández. A highlight performance came at the British Grand Prix, finishing fourth. Oliveira ended the season as 16th overall.

==== Trackhouse Racing (2024) ====
Miguel Oliveira finished in 15th place on the final standings, with a first-ever sprint race podium at the German Grand Prix. However, an injury suffered at the Indonesian Grand Prix kept him out for most of the latter races in 2024.

==== Prima Pramac Yamaha (2025) ====
Oliveira joined the Pramac Racing Team with Jack Miller as teammate. He sustained another injury that kept him out for the Americas, Qatar, and Spanish Grands Prix.

At seasons end, Oliveira was replaced by three-time Superbike champion Toprak Razgatlıoğlu for the 2026 season and would therefore leave Pramac and the championship.

=== World Superbike Championship ===
==== ROKiT BMW Motorrad WorldSBK Team (2026–) ====
Oliveira officially joined the BMW Motorrad factory team to compete in the World Superbike (WorldSBK) starting in the 2026 season, he replaced, and effectively swapped bikes, with Toprak Razgatlıoğlu. This move marked the end of his MotoGP career and he would be Danilo Petrucci's teammate at the team.

== Personal life ==
Oliveira is studying to become a dentist concurrently with his Grand Prix racing career.

In 2017, Oliveira initiated a pioneering pedagogic project in Portugal – the Oliveira Cup. This Motorcycle School Trophy, with his mentoring, is directed at young people from 10 to 14 years old, and aims to find his "successor". It enrolled 12 young riders for the first year.

In September 2020, Oliveira announced his engagement to Andreia Pimenta, his stepsister. Oliveira and Andreia Pimenta announced in 2021 she was expecting their first child.

== Career highlights ==
- 2004 – 4th place in Troféu Mini GP (Portuguese championship)
- 2005 – 1st place in Metrakit World Festival (World champion), 1st place in Troféu Mini GP (Portuguese championship), 2nd place in Madrid Mini GP (Spanish championship)
- 2006 – 1st place in RACE Madrid (Spanish Trophy), 1st place in Troféu Mini GP XL 70cc (Portuguese championship)
- 2007 – 1st place in Troféu Open Racc Pre-125 (Spanish championship), 3rd place in Metrakit World Festival (World championship)
- 2008 – 3rd place in Troféu Open Racc Pre-125 (Spanish championship), 8th place in Red Bull MotoGP Rookies Cup at Estoril, 1st place in Red Bull MotoGP Rookies Cup at Donington and Assen, 1st place in 250cc 4T at Jerez
- 2009 – 3rd place in CEV final standings (Spanish championship), 5th place European 125GP
- 2010 – 2nd place (runner-up) in the European 125GP championship, 2nd place (runner-up) in CEV (Spanish championship)
- 2015 – 2nd in Moto3 World Championship (9 podiums, 6 wins)
- 2017 – 3rd in Moto2 World Championship (9 podiums, 3 wins)
- 2018 – 2nd in Moto2 World Championship (12 podiums, 3 wins)
- 2020 – 1st win in MotoGP World Championship (Styrian Grand Prix), 1st place in Portuguese Grand Prix (2nd MotoGP career win)
- 2021 – 1st place at Catalunya. 3rd MotoGP class career win.
- 2022 – 1st place at Indonesia. 4th MotoGP class career win.
- 2022 – 1st place at Thailand. 5th MotoGP class career win.

== Career statistics ==
=== Red Bull MotoGP Rookies Cup ===
==== Races by year ====
(key) (Races in bold indicate pole position, races in italics indicate fastest lap)

Year	1	2	3	4	5	6	7	8	9	10	Pos	Pts
2008	SPA1	SPA2	POR; 8	FRA	ITA	GBR; 1	NED; 1	GER	CZE1	CZE2	12th	58

=== Grand Prix motorcycle racing ===
==== By season ====
Season	Class	Motorcycle	Team	Race	Win	Podium	Pole	FLap	Pts	Plcd
2011	125cc	Aprilia	Andalucia Banca Civica	11	0	0	0	0	44	14th
2012	Moto3	Suter Honda	Estrella Galicia 0,0	17	0	2	0	0	114	8th
2013	Moto3	Mahindra	Mahindra Racing	17	0	1	1	3	150	6th
2014	Moto3	Mahindra	Mahindra Racing	17	0	1	0	0	110	10th
2015	Moto3	KTM	Red Bull KTM Ajo	17	6	9	1	3	254	**2nd**
2016	Moto2	Kalex	Leopard Racing	14	0	0	0	0	36	21st
2017	Moto2	KTM	Red Bull KTM Ajo	18	3	9	2	3	241	**3rd**
2018	Moto2	KTM	Red Bull KTM Ajo	18	3	12	0	1	297	**2nd**
2019	MotoGP	KTM	Red Bull KTM Tech3	16	0	0	0	0	33	17th
2020	MotoGP	KTM	Red Bull KTM Tech3	14	2	2	1	1	125	9th
2021	MotoGP	KTM	Red Bull KTM Factory Racing	18	1	3	0	1	94	14th
2022	MotoGP	KTM	Red Bull KTM Factory Racing	20	2	2	0	0	149	10th
2023	MotoGP	Aprilia	CryptoData RNF MotoGP Team	16	0	0	0	0	76	16th
2024	MotoGP	Aprilia	Trackhouse Racing	15	0	0	0	0	75	15th
2025	MotoGP	Yamaha	Prima Pramac Yamaha MotoGP	17	0	0	0	0	43	20th
Total				**246**	**17**	**41**	**5**	**12**	**1841**	

==== By class ====
Class	Seasons	1st GP	1st pod	1st win	Race	Win	Podiums	Pole	FLap	Pts	WChmp
125cc	2011	2011 Qatar			11	0	0	0	0	44	0
Moto3	2012–2015	2012 Qatar	2012 Catalunya	2015 Italy	68	6	13	2	6	628	0
Moto2	2016–2018	2016 Qatar	2017 Argentina	2017 Australia	50	6	21	2	4	574	0
MotoGP	2019–2025	2019 Qatar	2020 Styria	2020 Styria	117	5	7	1	2	595	0
Total	2011–2025				**246**	**17**	**41**	**5**	**12**	**1841**	**0**

==== Races by year ====
(key) (Races in bold indicate pole position, races in italics indicate fastest lap)

Year	Class	Bike	1	2	3	4	5	6	7	8	9	10	11	12	13	14	15	16	17	18	19	20	21	22	Pos	Pts
2011	125cc	Aprilia	QAT; 10	SPA; Ret	POR; 7	FRA; 9	CAT; Ret	GBR	NED	ITA; 8	GER; Ret	CZE; 23	INP; 8	RSM; 10	ARA; Ret	JPN	AUS	MAL	VAL						14th	44
2012	Moto3	Suter Honda	QAT; 5	SPA; Ret	POR; Ret	FRA; Ret	CAT; 3	GBR; 10	NED; 10	GER; 19	ITA; Ret	INP; 4	CZE; 9	RSM; 9	ARA; 8	JPN; 7	MAL; 5	AUS; 2	VAL; Ret						8th	114
2013	Moto3	Mahindra	QAT; 7	AME; 5	SPA; 16	FRA; Ret	ITA; 4	CAT; 6	**NED**; 4	GER; 4	INP; 8	CZE; 9	GBR; 5	RSM; 7	ARA; 5	MAL; 3	AUS; 26	JPN; 4	VAL; 10						6th	150
2014	Moto3	Mahindra	QAT; 4	AME; 15	ARG; DNS	SPA; 14	FRA; 12	ITA; 4	CAT; 12	NED; 3	GER; Ret	INP; 7	CZE; 7	GBR; 4	RSM; 22	ARA; 7	JPN; Ret	AUS; 7	MAL; Ret	VAL; 8					10th	110
2015	Moto3	KTM	QAT; 16	AME; Ret	**ARG**; 4	SPA; 2	FRA; 8	ITA; 1	CAT; 5	NED; 1	GER; DNS	INP; 15	CZE; 8	GBR; 13	RSM; 2	ARA; 1	JPN; 2	AUS; 1	MAL; 1	VAL; 1					2nd	254
2016	Moto2	Kalex	QAT; 11	ARG; 21	AME; Ret	SPA; Ret	FRA; 9	ITA; 13	CAT; 8	NED; 15	GER; Ret	AUT; 14	CZE; 9	GBR; Ret	RSM; 17	ARA; DNS	JPN; DNS	AUS	MAL	VAL; 13					21st	36
2017	Moto2	KTM	QAT; 4	**ARG**; 2	AME; 6	SPA; 3	FRA; 17	ITA; 5	CAT; 3	NED; 5	GER; 2	CZE; 3	AUT; Ret	GBR; 8	RSM; Ret	**ARA**; 3	JPN; 7	AUS; 1	MAL; 1	VAL; 1					3rd	241
2018	Moto2	KTM	QAT; 5	ARG; 3	AME; 3	SPA; 2	FRA; 6	ITA; 1	CAT; 2	NED; 6	GER; 4	CZE; 1	AUT; 2	GBR; C	RSM; 2	ARA; 7	THA; 3	JPN; 3	AUS; 11	MAL; 2	VAL; 1				2nd	297
2019	MotoGP	KTM	QAT; 17	ARG; 11	AME; 14	SPA; 18	FRA; 15	ITA; 16	CAT; 12	NED; 13	GER; 18	CZE; 13	AUT; 8	GBR; Ret	RSM; 16	ARA; 13	THA; 16	JPN; 12	AUS; DNS	MAL; DNS	VAL				17th	33
2020	MotoGP	KTM	SPA; 8	ANC; Ret	CZE; 6	AUT; Ret	STY; 1	RSM; 11	EMI; 5	CAT; Ret	FRA; 6	ARA; 16	TER; 6	EUR; 5	VAL; 6	**POR**; 1									9th	125
2021	MotoGP	KTM	QAT; 13	DOH; 15	POR; 16	SPA; 11	FRA; Ret	ITA; 2	CAT; 1	GER; 2	NED; 5	STY; Ret	AUT; Ret	GBR; 16	ARA; 14	RSM; 20	AME; 11	EMI; Ret	ALR; Ret	VAL; 14					14th	94
2022	MotoGP	KTM	QAT; Ret	INA; 1	ARG; 13	AME; 18	POR; 5	SPA; 12	FRA; Ret	ITA; 9	CAT; 9	GER; 9	NED; 9	GBR; 6	AUT; 12	RSM; 11	ARA; 11	JPN; 5	THA; 1	AUS; 12	MAL; 13	VAL; 5			10th	149
2023	MotoGP	Aprilia	POR; Ret**^{7}**	ARG	AME; 5^{8}	SPA; Ret^{5}	FRA	ITA; Ret	GER; 10	NED; Ret	GBR; 4	AUT; Ret	CAT; 5	RSM; 6	IND; 12	JPN; 18	INA; 12	AUS; 13	THA; Ret	MAL; Ret	QAT; DNS	VAL			16th	76
2024	MotoGP	Aprilia	QAT; 15	POR; 8	AME; 11	SPA; 8^{8}	FRA; Ret	CAT; 10	ITA; 14	NED; 15	GER; 6^{2}	GBR; Ret	AUT; 12	ARA; Ret^{5}	RSM; 11	EMI; 10	INA; DNS	JPN	AUS	THA	MAL	SLD; 12			15th	75
2025	MotoGP	Yamaha	THA; 14	ARG; DNS	AME	QAT	SPA	FRA; Ret	GBR; 16	ARA; 15	ITA; 13	NED; Ret	GER; Ret	CZE; 17	AUT; 17	HUN; 12	CAT; 9	RSM; 9	JPN; 14	INA; 11^{9}	AUS; 12	MAL; 19	POR; 14	VAL; 11	20th	43

=== Superbike World Championship ===
==== Races by season ====
Season	Motorcycle	Team	Race	Win	Podium	Pole	FLap	Pts	Plcd
2026	BMW M1000RR	ROKiT BMW Motorrad WorldSBK Team	29	0	4	0	0	142	11th
Total			**29**	**0**	**4**	**0**	**0**	**142**	

==== Races by year ====
(key) (Races in bold indicate pole position; races in italics indicate fastest lap)

Year	Bike	1			2			3			4			5			6			7			8			9			10			11			12			Pos	Pts
Year	Bike	R1	SR	R2	R1	SR	R2	R1	SR	R2	R1	SR	R2	R1	SR	R2	R1	SR	R2	R1	SR	R2	R1	SR	R2	R1	SR	R2	R1	SR	R2	R1	SR	R2	R1	SR	R2	Pos	Pts
2026	BMW	AUS; 8	AUS; 18	AUS; 7	POR; 3	POR; 3	POR; 3	NED; 7	NED; 11	NED; 12	HUN; 3	HUN; Ret	HUN; DNS	CZE	CZE	CZE	ARA	ARA	ARA	EMI; 8	EMI; 6	EMI; Ret	GBR; 11	GBR; 20	GBR; 12	FRA; Ret	FRA; 12	FRA; 15	ITA; Ret	ITA; 8	ITA; Ret	POR; 4	POR; 4	POR; 8	SPA; Ret	SPA; 11	SPA; 10	11th	142

Awards
Preceded by Rui Costa	Portuguese Sportsman of the Year; 2015	Succeeded by Fernando Pimenta
