= Takaaki Nakagami =

Japanese motorcycle racer (born 1992)

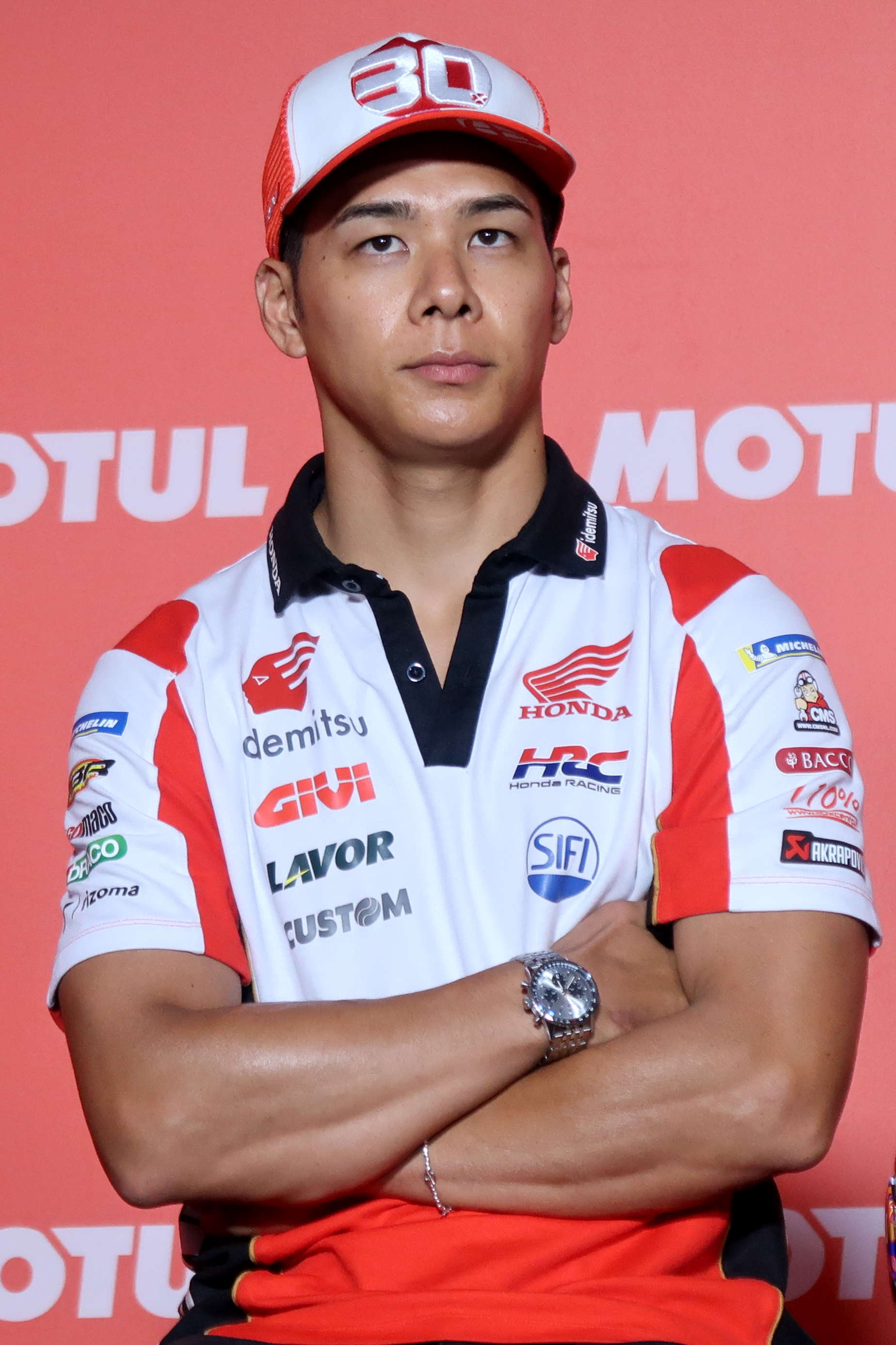
- Nakagami at the 2023 Japanese Grand Prix
- Nationality: Japanese
- Born: 9 February 1992 (age 34); Chiba, Japan
- Current team: Honda HRC Test Team
- Bike number: 30
Motorcycle racing career statistics
MotoGP World Championship
Active years	2018–2026
Manufacturers	Honda
Championships	0
2025 championship position	23rd (10 pts)
Starts / Wins / Podiums / Poles / F. laps / Points; 127 / 0 / 0 / 1 / 0 / 447
Moto2 World Championship
Active years	2011–2017
Manufacturers	Suter (2011); Kalex (2012–2017)
Championships	0
2017 championship position	7th (137 pts)
Starts / Wins / Podiums / Poles / F. laps / Points; 105 / 2 / 14 / 5 / 1 / 646
125cc World Championship
Active years	2007–2009
Manufacturers	Honda (2007); Aprilia (2008–2009)
Championships	0
2009 championship position	16th (43 pts)
Starts / Wins / Podiums / Poles / F. laps / Points; 34 / 0 / 0 / 0 / 0 / 55

Takaaki Nakagami (Japanese: 中上 貴晶, Hepburn: Nakagami Takaaki; born 9 February 1992) is a Japanese Grand Prix motorcycle racer, who competed for Idemitsu Honda LCR in the MotoGP class until retiring from full time competition after the 2024 season. He currently acts as a test rider for HRC based in Japan, and team liaison for Honda's Japanese and Italian teams in MotoGP from the 2025 season.

Nakagami won the Japanese Road Race Championship 125cc class in 2006 and J-GP2 class in 2011.

== Career ==
=== Early career ===
Born in Chiba, Nakagami joined the Japanese Road Race Championship in the GP125 category in 2005 joining the Harc-Pro Honda Team finishing 13th as a rookie in the series. He stayed in the Japanese 125cc championship for 2006 with Harc-Pro again, winning every race of the season; becoming the youngest-ever Japanese 125cc champion. Also in 2006, Nakagami joined the MotoGP Academy which gave him the chance to compete overseas for the first time in the Spanish CEV 125cc series. Nakagami finished in 12th position of the championship. His best result came in the second round at Jerez, finishing in fifth place.

Nakagami decided to focus on the CEV 125cc championship in 2007 with the MotoGP Academy. Nakagami's results improved in 2007, and he finished in soixth place overall with a third-place finish at Valencia as his best result. Nakagami also received his first 125cc World Championship wildcard entry at the final round of the season in Valencia, qualifying in 20th position but failing to finish the race.

Nakagami impressed enough to secure a full-time ride in the 125cc World Championship for 2008, joining the Italian I.C. Team riding an Aprilia, he finished the season in 24th overall with a best finish of eighth place at Donington Park. For 2009, Nakagami joined another Italian team, Ongetta I.S.P.A., again on an Aprilia RS125. He improved his overall performance, finishing 16th overall with his best results being two fifth places at a wet Le Mans and at Donington Park.

Despite having offers to remain in the 125cc championship in 2010, Nakagami decided to return to Japan and rejoin the Harc-Pro team, He won the Suzuka 8 Hours in 2010 and competing the Japanese ST600 championship aboard a Honda. Nakagami won the first race of the season at Tsukuba. He went on to finish eighth overall. He remained with Harc-Pro in 2012, but changed classes and entered the J-GP2 class aboard a Honda HP6. Nakagami won five of the six races during the season and the championship, despite not competing in the Okayama round due to injuries sustained when he was substituting at the Motegi Moto2 World Championship round for the Italtrans Racing Team.

=== Moto2 World Championship ===
==== Italtrans Racing Team (2012–2013) ====
===== 2012 =====
Nakagami did enough during his substitute display to earn a full-time ride for the Italtrans Racing Team in the 2012 Moto2 World Championship riding a Kalex with a Honda CBR600 engine. He finished his rookie season 15th in the standings with a best result of fifth at Jerez.

===== 2013 =====
For 2013, Nakagami remained in Moto2 with Italtrans aboard a Kalex. At the opening round at Losail, Nakagami achieved his first podium in Grand Prix racing with a third-place finish. At Le Mans, Nakagami earned his first pole position in Grand Prix racing. Nakagami achieved his second career Grand Prix podium with a second-place finish behind Esteve Rabat at Indianapolis; he led most of the race but was passed in the closing laps and finished less than a second from victory. He took his second pole of the season at the Czech Grand Prix, at Brno; he went on to take his second successive second-place finish, behind Mika Kallio. He once again took pole at the British Grand Prix at Silverstone and again finished second, this time behind Championship leader and home rider Scott Redding. At Misano, Nakagami finished second for the fourth race in a row; he led the majority of the race before he was passed by Pol Espargaró in the closing laps. He finished the season 8th overall with 149 points.

==== Idemitsu Honda Team Asia (2014–2017) ====
===== 2014 =====
For 2014, Nakagami signed to ride for Tadayuki Okada's team, Idemitsu Honda Team Asia. A positive start to the season with a second-place finish at Qatar was denied as he was disqualified for technical reasons. Nakagami struggled for the rest of the year with bike set-up, and finished the season in 22nd position.

===== 2015 =====
Despite the struggles of 2014, Nakagami remained with Honda Team Asia for 2015. He managed to improve and finished on the podium in Misano, ultimately matching his 2013 result of eighth overall with 100 points.

===== 2016 =====
In 2016, Nakagami scored his first victory in Assen. He collected three third-place finishes and eight top-five finishes to end the season sixth in points, his overall best finish in the Moto2 class.

===== 2017 =====
Continuing with Honda Team Asia in 2017, Nakagami won at Silverstone and claimed three third-place finishes, and ranked seventh in points.

=== MotoGP World Championship ===
==== LCR Honda Idemitsu (2018–2024) ====
===== 2018 =====
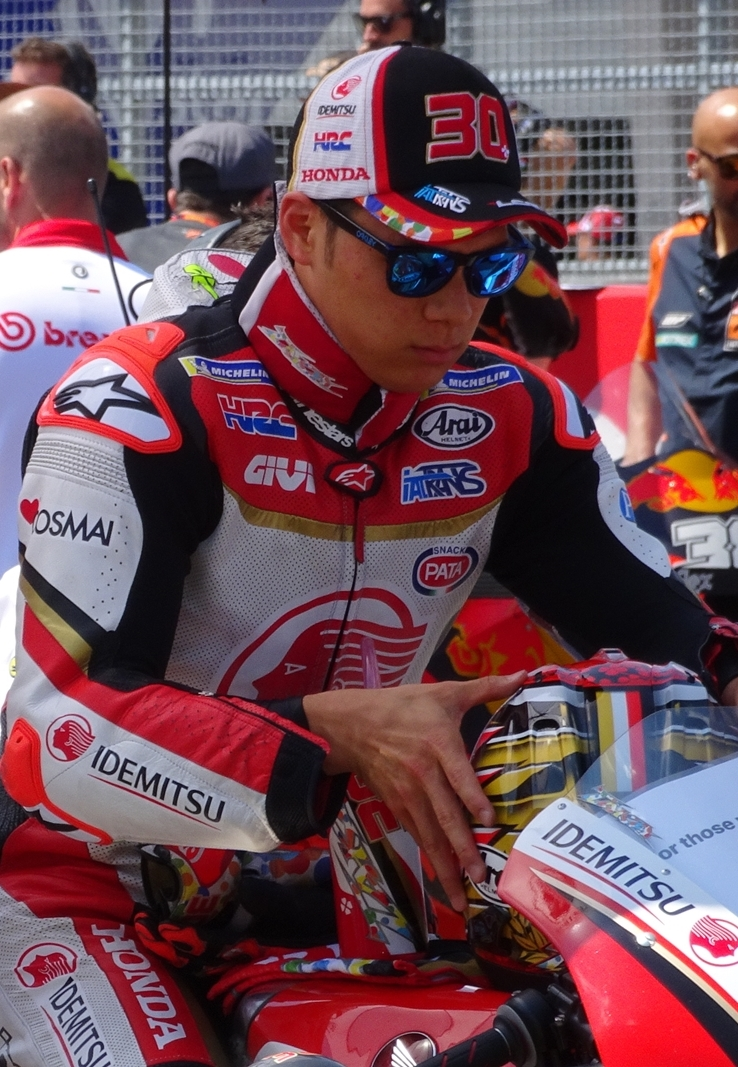
Nakagami at the 2018 German Grand Prix

Nakagami moved up to MotoGP in 2018, signing with LCR Team to ride a year-old Honda remaining with Idemitsu sponsorship. With regular finishes in the low point-scoring positions, he completed his rookie season with 33 points, and 20th in the championship.

===== 2019 =====
In October 2018, it was confirmed that Nakagami would remain at LCR Honda on a 2018-spec machine for the 2019 MotoGP season beside teammate Cal Crutchlow. In the first half of the season he regularly achieved top-ten finishes, but a heavy crash at the Dutch TT and a subsequent shoulder injury led to a drop in form. He elected to prematurely end his season after his home Grand Prix to undergo surgery repairing his damaged shoulder, and recover before the 2020 season. He was replaced for the final three rounds by KTM-exile Johann Zarco. Nakagami ultimately finished the season in 13th position with 74 points, more than doubling his point tally from his rookie season.

===== 2020 =====
In mid-October 2019, LCR Honda confirmed Nakagami would remain with the team for another season on a year-old machinery in 2020. After opening round crashes and subsequent injuries for teammate Crutchlow and Honda factory rider Marc Márquez, Nakagami quickly emerged as Honda's top rider in the first half of the season, finishing as the top Honda rider (always within the top-ten) and scoring all manufacturer's championship points for the marque in the first eight rounds. At the Teruel Grand Prix, Nakagami qualified on pole position, the first pole for a Japanese rider in nearly 16 years. He finished the year tenth in the championship, with 116 points.

===== 2021 =====
In October 2020, based on his strong early season performances, Honda and LCR announced that Nakagami would remain with the team at least until the end of 2022 (his first multi-year contract in the MotoGP class) and would receive factory-spec machinery from 2021. Unfortunately for Nakagami, the 2021 Honda bike was one of the weakest in recent years, with Honda drivers regularly finishing on the cusp, or sometimes even outside the top-ten. Nakagami's season high result was a fourth place in Jerez, overall ending the season just 15th in the standings, with 76 points, six in front of teammate Álex Márquez.

===== 2022 =====
Nakagami stayed with the LCR team for 2022. It was the same story in 2022 as Honda's new machine failed to deliver an upturn in results. With a best finish of seventh, he ended the season 18th in the standings with 48 points, two points behind teammate Alex Marquez.

===== 2023 =====
Nakagami stayed with the same team for the 2023 season, partnering his 2023 teammate Álex Rins. He finished 18th in the standings with 56 points, two ahead of teammate Rins.

===== 2024 =====
Nakagami continued with LCR Honda, this time partnering with Johann Zarco. This was his last season in MotoGP as he opted to retire after seven full time seasons, to become a Honda factory test rider in 2025 moving into a new role in Japan.

==== Honda HRC Test Team (2025–) ====
===== 2025 =====
Nakagami entered the 2025 French motorcycle Grand Prix as a wildcard for the Honda team, and finished an impressive sixth in a weather-affected race.

===== 2026 =====
Nakagami deputised for an unwell Joan Mir at the factory Honda team during the Austrian Grand Prix. He made a wildcard appearance for his home Japanese Grand Prix but broke his collarbone during opening practice, thereby missing the remainder of the weekend.

== Career statistics ==
=== Grand Prix motorcycle racing ===
==== By season ====
Season	Class	Motorcycle	Team	Race	Win	Podium	Pole	FLap	Pts	Plcd
2007	125cc	Honda RS125R	Red Bull MotoGP Academy	1	0	0	0	0	0	NC
2008	125cc	Aprilia RS125	I.C. Team	17	0	0	0	0	12	24th
2009	125cc	Aprilia RS125	Ongetta Team I.S.P.A.	16	0	0	0	0	43	16th
2011	Moto2	Suter MMXI	Italtrans Racing Team	0	0	0	0	0	0	NC
2012	Moto2	Kalex Moto2	Italtrans Racing Team	17	0	0	0	0	57	15th
2013	Moto2	Kalex Moto2	Italtrans Racing Team	16	0	5	3	0	149	8th
2014	Moto2	Kalex Moto2	Idemitsu Honda Team Asia	18	0	0	0	0	34	22nd
2015	Moto2	Kalex Moto2	Idemitsu Honda Team Asia	18	0	1	0	0	100	8th
2016	Moto2	Kalex Moto2	Idemitsu Honda Team Asia	18	1	4	1	1	169	6th
2017	Moto2	Kalex Moto2	Idemitsu Honda Team Asia	18	1	4	1	0	137	7th
2018	MotoGP	Honda RC213V	LCR Honda Idemitsu	18	0	0	0	0	33	20th
2019	MotoGP	Honda RC213V	LCR Honda Idemitsu	16	0	0	0	0	74	13th
2020	MotoGP	Honda RC213V	LCR Honda Idemitsu	14	0	0	1	0	116	10th
2021	MotoGP	Honda RC213V	LCR Honda Idemitsu	18	0	0	0	0	76	15th
2022	MotoGP	Honda RC213V	LCR Honda Idemitsu	17	0	0	0	0	48	18th
2023	MotoGP	Honda RC213V	LCR Honda Idemitsu	20	0	0	0	0	56	18th
2024	MotoGP	Honda RC213V	Idemitsu Honda LCR	20	0	0	0	0	31	19th
2025	MotoGP	Honda RC213V	Honda HRC Test Team	2	0	0	0	0	10	23rd
2025	MotoGP	Honda RC213V	Honda HRC Castrol	1	0	0	0	0	10	23rd
2025	MotoGP	Honda RC213V	LCR Honda Idemitsu	0	0	0	0	0	10	23rd
2026	MotoGP	Honda RC213V	Honda HRC Castrol	1	0	0	0	0	3*	26th*
Total				**266**	**2**	**14**	**6**	**1**	**1148**	

==== By class ====
Class	Seasons	1st GP	1st Pod	1st Win	Race	Win	Podium	Pole	FLap	Pts	WChmp
125cc	2007–2009	2007 Valencia			34	0	0	0	0	55	0
Moto2	2011–2017	2011 Japan	2013 Qatar	2016 Netherlands	105	2	14	5	1	646	0
MotoGP	2018–present	2018 Qatar			127	0	0	1	0	447	0
Total	2007–present				**266**	**2**	**14**	**6**	**1**	**1148**	**0**

==== Races by year ====
(key) (Races in bold indicate pole position, races in italics indicate fastest lap)

Year	Class	Bike	1	2	3	4	5	6	7	8	9	10	11	12	13	14	15	16	17	18	19	20	21	22	Pos	Pts
2007	125cc	Honda	QAT	SPA	TUR	CHN	FRA	ITA	CAT	GBR	NED	GER	CZE	RSM	POR	JPN	AUS	MAL	VAL; Ret						NC	0
2008	125cc	Aprilia	QAT; 19	SPA; 15	POR; 19	CHN; Ret	FRA; 16	ITA; 16	CAT; 22	GBR; 8	NED; Ret	GER; 18	CZE; Ret	RSM; 19	INP; Ret	JPN; 13	AUS; Ret	MAL; Ret	VAL; 16						24th	12
2009	125cc	Aprilia	QAT; 20	JPN; 20	SPA; 16	FRA; 5	ITA; 15	CAT; 15	NED; 17	GER; Ret	GBR; 5	CZE; 19	INP; 9	RSM; 20	POR; 11	AUS; 18	MAL; 11	VAL; 14							16th	43
2011	Moto2	Suter	QAT	SPA	POR	FRA	CAT	GBR	NED	ITA	GER	CZE	INP	RSM	ARA	JPN; DNS	AUS	MAL	VAL						NC	0
2012	Moto2	Kalex	QAT; 14	SPA; 5	POR; 18	FRA; Ret	CAT; 6	GBR; 19	NED; 12	GER; 19	ITA; 7	INP; 16	CZE; 17	RSM; 11	ARA; 29	JPN; 7	MAL; Ret	AUS; 9	VAL; Ret						15th	57
2013	Moto2	Kalex	QAT; 3	AME; Ret	SPA; 4	**FRA**; Ret	ITA; Ret	CAT; 5	NED; DNS	GER; 10	INP; 2	**CZE**; 2	**GBR**; 2	RSM; 2	ARA; 11	MAL; 8	AUS; 22	JPN; 9	VAL; 13						8th	149
2014	Moto2	Kalex	QAT; DSQ	AME; 11	ARG; 15	SPA; Ret	FRA; 16	ITA; 16	CAT; 13	NED; 14	GER; 21	INP; 11	CZE; 19	GBR; 15	RSM; 10	ARA; 15	JPN; 13	AUS; 11	MAL; Ret	VAL; 14					22nd	34
2015	Moto2	Kalex	QAT; 14	AME; 10	ARG; 20	SPA; 17	FRA; 7	ITA; 13	CAT; 20	NED; 13	GER; 7	INP; 9	CZE; 12	GBR; 14	RSM; 3	ARA; 8	JPN; 22	AUS; 4	MAL; 4	VAL; 11					8th	100
2016	Moto2	Kalex	QAT; 14	ARG; 9	AME; 15	SPA; 7	FRA; 5	ITA; 9	CAT; 3	NED; 1	**GER**; 11	AUT; 7	CZE; Ret	GBR; 3	RSM; 3	ARA; 5	JPN; 4	AUS; 5	MAL; 21	VAL; 6					6th	169
2017	Moto2	Kalex	QAT; 3	ARG; Ret	AME; 3	SPA; 21	FRA; 7	ITA; Ret	CAT; 10	NED; 3	GER; 10	CZE; 24	AUT; 6	GBR; 1	RSM; 10	ARA; 8	**JPN**; 6	AUS; Ret	MAL; Ret	VAL; 7					7th	137
2018	MotoGP	Honda	QAT; 17	ARG; 13	AME; 14	SPA; 12	FRA; 15	ITA; 18	CAT; Ret	NED; 19	GER; Ret	CZE; 17	AUT; 15	GBR; C	RSM; 13	ARA; 12	THA; 22	JPN; 15	AUS; 14	MAL; 14	VAL; 6				20th	33
2019	MotoGP	Honda	QAT; 9	ARG; 7	AME; 10	SPA; 9	FRA; Ret	ITA; 5	CAT; 8	NED; Ret	GER; 14	CZE; 9	AUT; 11	GBR; 17	RSM; 18	ARA; 10	THA; 10	JPN; 16	AUS	MAL	VAL				13th	74
2020	MotoGP	Honda	SPA; 10	ANC; 4	CZE; 8	AUT; 6	STY; 7	RSM; 9	EMI; 6	CAT; 7	FRA; 7	ARA; 5	**TER**; Ret	EUR; 4	VAL; Ret	POR; 5									10th	116
2021	MotoGP	Honda	QAT; Ret	DOH; 17	POR; 10	SPA; 4	FRA; 7	ITA; Ret	CAT; 13	GER; 13	NED; 9	STY; 5	AUT; 13	GBR; 13	ARA; 10	RSM; 10	AME; 17	EMI; 15	ALR; 11	VAL; Ret					15th	76
2022	MotoGP	Honda	QAT; 10	INA; 19	ARG; 12	AME; 14	POR; 16	SPA; 7	FRA; 7	ITA; 8	CAT; Ret	GER; Ret	NED; 12	GBR; 13	AUT; Ret	RSM; 15	ARA; Ret	JPN; 20	THA	AUS	MAL	VAL; 14			18th	48
2023	MotoGP	Honda	POR; 12	ARG; 13	AME; Ret	SPA; 9	FRA; 9	ITA; 13	GER; 14	NED; 8	GBR; 16	AUT; 18	CAT; 15	RSM; 19	IND; 11	JPN; 11	INA; 11	AUS; 19	THA; 14	MAL; 18	QAT; 19	VAL; 12			18th	56
2024	MotoGP	Honda	QAT; 19	POR; 14	AME; Ret	SPA; 14	FRA; 14	CAT; 14	ITA; Ret	NED; 16	GER; 14	GBR; 15	AUT; 14	ARA; 12	RSM; 13	EMI; 17	INA; 12	JPN; 13	AUS; 18	THA; 13	MAL; Ret	SLD; 17			19th	31
2025	MotoGP	Honda	THA	ARG	AME	QAT	SPA	FRA; 6	GBR	ARA	ITA; 16	NED	GER	CZE; DNS	AUT	HUN	CAT	RSM	JPN; Ret	INA	AUS	MAL	POR	VAL	23rd	10
2026	MotoGP	Honda	THA	BRA	USA	SPA	FRA	CAT	ITA	HUN	CZE	NED	GER	GBR	ARA	RSM	AUT; 13	JPN; WD	INA	AUS	MAL	QAT	POR	VAL	26th*	3*

=== Suzuka 8 Hours results ===
Year	Team	Co-riders	Bike	Pos
2010	(Japan) MuSASHi RT HARC-PRO	(Japan) Ryuichi Kiyonari (Japan) Takumi Takahashi	CBR1000RRW	1st
2018	Red Bull Honda with Japan Post	(United States) PJ Jacobsen (Japan) Takumi Takahashi	CBR1000RRW	2nd
