= 2015 Italian motorcycle Grand Prix =

Motorcycle race

(Italy) 2015 Italian Grand Prix
Race details
- Race 6 of 18 races in the 2015 Grand Prix motorcycle racing season
- Date: 31 May 2015
- Official name: Gran Premio d'Italia TIM
- Location: Autodromo Internazionale del Mugello
- Course: Permanent racing facility; 5.245 km (3.259 mi)

MotoGP
Pole position
Rider	(Italy) Andrea Iannone	Ducati
Time	1:46.489	
Fastest lap
Rider	(Spain) Marc Márquez	Honda
Time	1:47.654 on lap 3	
Podium
First	(Spain) Jorge Lorenzo	Yamaha
Second	(Italy) Andrea Iannone	Ducati
Third	(Italy) Valentino Rossi	Yamaha

Moto2
Pole position
Rider	(United Kingdom) Sam Lowes	Speed Up
Time	1:51.514	
Fastest lap
Rider	(Spain) Tito Rabat	Kalex
Time	1:52.530 on lap 7	
Podium
First	(Spain) Tito Rabat	Kalex
Second	(France) Johann Zarco	Kalex
Third	(Switzerland) Dominique Aegerter	Kalex

Moto3
Pole position
Rider	(United Kingdom) Danny Kent	Honda
Time	1:56.615	
Fastest lap
Rider	(South Africa) Brad Binder	KTM
Time	1:57.318 on lap 3	
Podium
First	(Portugal) Miguel Oliveira	KTM
Second	(United Kingdom) Danny Kent	Honda
Third	(Italy) Romano Fenati	KTM

The 2015 Italian motorcycle Grand Prix was the sixth round of the 2015 Grand Prix motorcycle racing season. It was held at the Autodromo Internazionale del Mugello in Scarperia on 31 May 2015.

In the MotoGP class, Ducati's Andrea Iannone took his first pole position. However, Jorge Lorenzo won his third consecutive race ahead of Iannone and Valentino Rossi, who started from eighth on the grid. Honda's Marc Márquez was also running towards the front of the race, but he crashed out of the race at the three-quarter distance mark, while Andrea Dovizioso – third in the championship – was also forced to retire from the race, just after the halfway mark.

== Classification ==
=== MotoGP ===
Pos.	No.	Rider	Team	Manufacturer	Laps	Time/Retired	Grid	Points
1	99	(Spain) Jorge Lorenzo	Movistar Yamaha MotoGP	Yamaha	23	41:39.173	2	25
2	29	(Italy) Andrea Iannone	Ducati Team	Ducati	23	+5.563	1	20
3	46	(Italy) Valentino Rossi	Movistar Yamaha MotoGP	Yamaha	23	+6.661	8	16
4	26	(Spain) Dani Pedrosa	Repsol Honda Team	Honda	23	+9.978	7	13
5	38	(United Kingdom) Bradley Smith	Monster Yamaha Tech 3	Yamaha	23	+15.284	11	11
6	44	(Spain) Pol Espargaró	Monster Yamaha Tech 3	Yamaha	23	+15.665	10	10
7	25	(Spain) Maverick Viñales	Team Suzuki Ecstar	Suzuki	23	+23.805	9	9
8	51	(Italy) Michele Pirro	Ducati Team	Ducati	23	+29.152	6	8
9	9	(Italy) Danilo Petrucci	Octo Pramac Racing	Ducati	23	+32.008	14	7
10	68	(Colombia) Yonny Hernández	Octo Pramac Racing	Ducati	23	+34.571	12	6
11	45	(United Kingdom) Scott Redding	EG 0,0 Marc VDS	Honda	23	+38.553	17	5
12	76	(France) Loris Baz	Athinà Forward Racing	Yamaha Forward	23	+42.158	18	4
13	8	(Spain) Héctor Barberá	Avintia Racing	Ducati	23	+44.801	15	3
14	19	(Spain) Álvaro Bautista	Aprilia Racing Team Gresini	Aprilia	23	+50.435	21	2
15	50	(Republic of Ireland) Eugene Laverty	Aspar MotoGP Team	Honda	23	+53.060	24	1
16	63	(France) Mike Di Meglio	Avintia Racing	Ducati	23	+1:15.265	22	
17	17	(Czech Republic) Karel Abraham	AB Motoracing	Honda	23	+1:15.381	20	
18	33	(Italy) Marco Melandri	Aprilia Racing Team Gresini	Aprilia	23	+1:41.840	26	
Ret	35	(United Kingdom) Cal Crutchlow	CWM LCR Honda	Honda	20	Accident	4	
Ret	93	(Spain) Marc Márquez	Repsol Honda Team	Honda	17	Accident	13	
Ret	4	(Italy) Andrea Dovizioso	Ducati Team	Ducati	13	Retirement	3	
Ret	6	(Germany) Stefan Bradl	Athinà Forward Racing	Yamaha Forward	3	Accident	16	
Ret	69	(United States) Nicky Hayden	Aspar MotoGP Team	Honda	3	Accident	19	
Ret	41	(Spain) Aleix Espargaró	Team Suzuki Ecstar	Suzuki	2	Accident	5	
Ret	43	(Australia) Jack Miller	CWM LCR Honda	Honda	2	Accident	23	
Ret	15	(San Marino) Alex de Angelis	E-Motion IodaRacing Team	ART	2	Retirement	25	

=== Moto2 ===
Pos.	No.	Rider	Manufacturer	Laps	Time/Retired	Grid	Points
1	1	(Spain) Tito Rabat	Kalex	21	39:40.545	3	25
2	5	(France) Johann Zarco	Kalex	21	+0.308	6	20
3	77	(Switzerland) Dominique Aegerter	Kalex	21	+5.280	2	16
4	22	(United Kingdom) Sam Lowes	Speed Up	21	+5.554	1	13
5	39	(Spain) Luis Salom	Kalex	21	+7.493	5	11
6	19	(Belgium) Xavier Siméon	Kalex	21	+7.896	8	10
7	60	(Spain) Julián Simón	Speed Up	21	+10.495	12	9
8	11	(Germany) Sandro Cortese	Kalex	21	+17.380	11	8
9	49	(Spain) Axel Pons	Kalex	21	+17.775	10	7
10	7	(Italy) Lorenzo Baldassarri	Kalex	21	+18.836	16	6
11	40	(Spain) Álex Rins	Kalex	21	+20.698	9	5
12	73	(Spain) Álex Márquez	Kalex	21	+20.923	15	4
13	30	(Japan) Takaaki Nakagami	Kalex	21	+22.433	17	3
14	4	(Switzerland) Randy Krummenacher	Kalex	21	+22.762	20	2
15	25	(Malaysia) Azlan Shah	Kalex	21	+27.715	24	1
16	23	(Germany) Marcel Schrötter	Tech 3	21	+31.461	19	
17	88	(Spain) Ricard Cardús	Tech 3	21	+31.580	22	
18	54	(Italy) Mattia Pasini	Kalex	21	+32.778	18	
19	95	(Australia) Anthony West	Speed Up	21	+46.027	30	
20	96	(France) Louis Rossi	Tech 3	21	+46.557	26	
21	10	(Thailand) Thitipong Warokorn	Kalex	21	+46.929	31	
22	70	(Switzerland) Robin Mulhauser	Kalex	21	+46.962	25	
23	2	(Switzerland) Jesko Raffin	Kalex	21	+1:15.001	29	
24	66	(Germany) Florian Alt	Suter	20	+1 lap	27	
Ret	55	(Malaysia) Hafizh Syahrin	Kalex	19	Accident	14	
Ret	94	(Germany) Jonas Folger	Kalex	6	Accident	13	
Ret	3	(Italy) Simone Corsi	Kalex	6	Retirement	7	
Ret	21	(Italy) Franco Morbidelli	Kalex	4	Retirement	21	
Ret	36	(Finland) Mika Kallio	Kalex	4	Accident	23	
Ret	12	(Switzerland) Thomas Lüthi	Kalex	2	Accident	4	
Ret	51	(Malaysia) Zaqhwan Zaidi	Suter	0	Accident	28	
OFFICIAL MOTO2 REPORT

=== Moto3 ===
Pos.	No.	Rider	Manufacturer	Laps	Time/Retired	Grid	Points
1	44	(Portugal) Miguel Oliveira	KTM	20	39:39.510	11	25
2	52	(United Kingdom) Danny Kent	Honda	20	+0.071	1	20
3	5	(Italy) Romano Fenati	KTM	20	+0.127	3	16
4	21	(Italy) Francesco Bagnaia	Mahindra	20	+0.130	8	13
5	33	(Italy) Enea Bastianini	Honda	20	+0.200	7	11
6	23	(Italy) Niccolò Antonelli	Honda	20	+0.381	5	10
7	9	(Spain) Jorge Navarro	Honda	20	+1.498	18	9
8	32	(Spain) Isaac Viñales	Husqvarna	20	+1.576	10	8
9	10	(France) Alexis Masbou	Honda	20	+1.985	23	7
10	41	(South Africa) Brad Binder	KTM	20	+2.139	12	6
11	76	(Japan) Hiroki Ono	Honda	20	+4.966	2	5
12	31	(Finland) Niklas Ajo	KTM	20	+5.142	22	4
13	55	(Italy) Andrea Locatelli	Honda	20	+5.160	9	3
14	11	(Belgium) Livio Loi	Honda	20	+5.161	16	2
15	16	(Italy) Andrea Migno	KTM	20	+5.650	24	1
16	84	(Czech Republic) Jakub Kornfeil	KTM	20	+7.250	6	
17	88	(Spain) Jorge Martín	Mahindra	20	+8.568	20	
18	40	(South Africa) Darryn Binder	Mahindra	20	+17.230	28	
19	19	(Italy) Alessandro Tonucci	Mahindra	20	+17.291	32	
20	17	(United Kingdom) John McPhee	Honda	20	+17.305	19	
21	6	(Spain) María Herrera	Husqvarna	20	+17.337	27	
22	65	(Germany) Philipp Öttl	KTM	20	+26.448	21	
23	2	(Australia) Remy Gardner	Mahindra	20	+28.103	26	
24	12	(Italy) Matteo Ferrari	Mahindra	20	+28.136	30	
25	22	(Spain) Ana Carrasco	KTM	20	+28.176	31	
26	63	(Malaysia) Zulfahmi Khairuddin	KTM	20	+28.222	25	
27	73	(Italy) Anthony Groppi	FTR Honda	20	+28.819	34	
28	98	(Czech Republic) Karel Hanika	KTM	20	+34.625	4	
Ret	7	(Spain) Efrén Vázquez	Honda	19	Accident	15	
Ret	95	(France) Jules Danilo	Honda	19	Accident	17	
Ret	58	(Spain) Juan Francisco Guevara	Mahindra	16	Accident	14	
Ret	24	(Japan) Tatsuki Suzuki	Mahindra	14	Accident	36	
Ret	91	(Argentina) Gabriel Rodrigo	KTM	10	Accident	33	
Ret	20	(France) Fabio Quartararo	Honda	9	Retirement	13	
Ret	29	(Italy) Stefano Manzi	Mahindra	7	Accident	29	
Ret	72	(Italy) Marco Bezzecchi	Mahindra	3	Retirement	35	
OFFICIAL MOTO3 REPORT

== Championship standings after the race (MotoGP) ==
Below are the standings for the top five riders and constructors after round six has concluded.

Riders' Championship standings

Pos.	Rider	Points
1	(Italy) Valentino Rossi	118
2	(Spain) Jorge Lorenzo	112
3	(Italy) Andrea Dovizioso	83
4	(Italy) Andrea Iannone	81
5	(Spain) Marc Márquez	69

Constructors' Championship standings

Pos.	Constructor	Points
1	(Japan) Yamaha	141
2	(Italy) Ducati	106
3	(Japan) Honda	98
4	(Japan) Suzuki	47
5	(Switzerland) Yamaha Forward	10

- Note: Only the top five positions are included for both sets of standings.

Previous race: 2015 French Grand Prix	FIM Grand Prix World Championship; 2015 season	Next race: 2015 Catalan Grand Prix
Previous race: 2014 Italian Grand Prix	Italian motorcycle Grand Prix	Next race: 2016 Italian Grand Prix
