= 2017 Argentine Republic motorcycle Grand Prix =

(Argentina) 2017 Argentine Republic Grand Prix
Race details
- Race 2 of 18 races in the 2017 Grand Prix motorcycle racing season
- Date: 9 April 2017
- Official name: Gran Premio Motul de la República Argentina
- Location: Autódromo Termas de Río Hondo
- Course: Permanent racing facility; 4.806 km (2.986 mi)

MotoGP
Pole position
Rider	(Spain) Marc Márquez	Honda
Time	1:47.512	
Fastest lap
Rider	(Spain) Maverick Viñales	Yamaha
Time	1:39.694 on lap 12	
Podium
First	(Spain) Maverick Viñales	Yamaha
Second	(Italy) Valentino Rossi	Yamaha
Third	(United Kingdom) Cal Crutchlow	Honda

Moto2
Pole position
Rider	(Portugal) Miguel Oliveira	KTM
Time	1:45.616	
Fastest lap
Rider	(Portugal) Miguel Oliveira	KTM
Time	1:43.414 on lap 11	
Podium
First	(Italy) Franco Morbidelli	Kalex
Second	(Portugal) Miguel Oliveira	KTM
Third	(Switzerland) Thomas Lüthi	Kalex

Moto3
Pole position
Rider	(United Kingdom) John McPhee	Honda
Time	1:49.094	
Fastest lap
Rider	(Italy) Romano Fenati	Honda
Time	1:49.415 on lap 5	
Podium
First	(Spain) Joan Mir	Honda
Second	(United Kingdom) John McPhee	Honda
Third	(Spain) Jorge Martín	Honda

The 2017 Argentine Republic motorcycle Grand Prix was the second round of the 2017 MotoGP season. It was held at the Autódromo Termas de Río Hondo in Santiago del Estero on 9 April 2017. Both Repsol Honda riders crashed out of the race, thus marking their first double retirement since the 2015 Argentine Grand Prix.

== Classification ==
=== MotoGP ===
Pos.	No.	Rider	Team	Manufacturer	Laps	Time/Retired	Grid	Points
1	25	(Spain) Maverick Viñales	Movistar Yamaha MotoGP	Yamaha	25	41:45.060	6	25
2	46	(Italy) Valentino Rossi	Movistar Yamaha MotoGP	Yamaha	25	+2.915	7	20
3	35	(United Kingdom) Cal Crutchlow	LCR Honda	Honda	25	+3.754	3	16
4	19	(Spain) Álvaro Bautista	Pull&Bear Aspar Team	Ducati	25	+6.523	10	13
5	5	(France) Johann Zarco	Monster Yamaha Tech 3	Yamaha	25	+15.504	14	11
6	94	(Germany) Jonas Folger	Monster Yamaha Tech 3	Yamaha	25	+18.241	11	10
7	9	(Italy) Danilo Petrucci	Octo Pramac Racing	Ducati	25	+20.046	4	9
8	45	(United Kingdom) Scott Redding	Octo Pramac Racing	Ducati	25	+25.480	15	8
9	43	(Australia) Jack Miller	EG 0,0 Marc VDS	Honda	25	+25.665	17	7
10	17	(Czech Republic) Karel Abraham	Pull&Bear Aspar Team	Ducati	25	+26.403	2	6
11	76	(France) Loris Baz	Reale Avintia Racing	Ducati	25	+26.952	9	5
12	53	(Spain) Tito Rabat	EG 0,0 Marc VDS	Honda	25	+41.875	20	4
13	8	(Spain) Héctor Barberá	Reale Avintia Racing	Ducati	25	+42.770	21	3
14	44	(Spain) Pol Espargaró	Red Bull KTM Factory Racing	KTM	25	+43.085	18	2
15	38	(United Kingdom) Bradley Smith	Red Bull KTM Factory Racing	KTM	25	+43.452	19	1
16	29	(Italy) Andrea Iannone	Team Suzuki Ecstar	Suzuki	25	+46.219	12	
Ret	4	(Italy) Andrea Dovizioso	Ducati Team	Ducati	14	Collision	13	
Ret	41	(Spain) Aleix Espargaró	Aprilia Racing Team Gresini	Aprilia	14	Collision	8	
Ret	26	(Spain) Dani Pedrosa	Repsol Honda Team	Honda	13	Accident	5	
Ret	22	(United Kingdom) Sam Lowes	Aprilia Racing Team Gresini	Aprilia	11	Gearbox	22	
Ret	42	(Spain) Álex Rins	Team Suzuki Ecstar	Suzuki	11	Ankle Pain	23	
Ret	93	(Spain) Marc Márquez	Repsol Honda Team	Honda	3	Accident	1	
Ret	99	(Spain) Jorge Lorenzo	Ducati Team	Ducati	0	Collision	16	

=== Moto2 ===
Pos.	No.	Rider	Manufacturer	Laps	Time/Retired	Grid	Points
1	21	(Italy) Franco Morbidelli	Kalex	23	39:50.036	2	25
2	44	(Portugal) Miguel Oliveira	KTM	23	+1.683	1	20
3	12	(Switzerland) Thomas Lüthi	Kalex	23	+10.551	4	16
4	7	(Italy) Lorenzo Baldassarri	Kalex	23	+15.577	10	13
5	97	(Spain) Xavi Vierge	Tech 3	23	+24.527	8	11
6	24	(Italy) Simone Corsi	Speed Up	23	+24.783	19	10
7	42	(Italy) Francesco Bagnaia	Kalex	23	+24.965	13	9
8	11	(Germany) Sandro Cortese	Suter	23	+25.156	7	8
9	41	(South Africa) Brad Binder	KTM	23	+25.622	24	7
10	55	(Malaysia) Hafizh Syahrin	Kalex	23	+25.933	14	6
11	23	(Germany) Marcel Schrötter	Suter	23	+26.139	16	5
12	10	(Italy) Luca Marini	Kalex	23	+26.456	11	4
13	2	(Switzerland) Jesko Raffin	Kalex	23	+26.697	5	3
14	77	(Switzerland) Dominique Aegerter	Suter	23	+27.461	18	2
15	9	(Spain) Jorge Navarro	Kalex	23	+27.628	20	1
16	57	(Spain) Edgar Pons	Kalex	23	+36.690	23	
17	32	(Spain) Isaac Viñales	Kalex	23	+39.132	21	
18	60	(Spain) Julián Simón	Kalex	23	+39.297	26	
19	45	(Japan) Tetsuta Nagashima	Kalex	23	+39.444	27	
20	54	(Italy) Mattia Pasini	Kalex	23	+43.908	6	
21	73	(Spain) Álex Márquez	Kalex	23	+44.165	3	
22	68	(Colombia) Yonny Hernández	Kalex	23	+45.719	30	
23	62	(Italy) Stefano Manzi	Kalex	23	+52.618	32	
24	89	(Malaysia) Khairul Idham Pawi	Kalex	23	+59.071	28	
25	47	(Italy) Axel Bassani	Speed Up	23	+1:02.113	29	
Ret	52	(United Kingdom) Danny Kent	Suter	14	Accident	12	
Ret	5	(Italy) Andrea Locatelli	Kalex	7	Rider Ill	31	
Ret	19	(Belgium) Xavier Siméon	Kalex	2	Accident	9	
Ret	49	(Spain) Axel Pons	Kalex	1	Accident	15	
Ret	40	(France) Fabio Quartararo	Kalex	1	Accident	17	
Ret	30	(Japan) Takaaki Nakagami	Kalex	1	Accident Damage	22	
Ret	87	(Australia) Remy Gardner	Tech 3	0	Accident	25	
OFFICIAL MOTO2 REPORT

=== Moto3 ===
Pos.	No.	Rider	Manufacturer	Laps	Time/Retired	Grid	Points
1	36	(Spain) Joan Mir	Honda	21	38:33.377	16	25
2	17	(United Kingdom) John McPhee	Honda	21	+0.261	1	20
3	88	(Spain) Jorge Martín	Honda	21	+0.339	3	16
4	65	(Germany) Philipp Öttl	KTM	21	+0.641	10	13
5	16	(Italy) Andrea Migno	KTM	21	+0.890	8	11
6	11	(Belgium) Livio Loi	Honda	21	+7.598	12	10
7	5	(Italy) Romano Fenati	Honda	21	+7.761	6	9
8	24	(Japan) Tatsuki Suzuki	Honda	21	+7.831	9	8
9	58	(Spain) Juan Francisco Guevara	KTM	21	+12.000	7	7
10	27	(Japan) Kaito Toba	Honda	21	+12.079	18	6
11	44	(Spain) Arón Canet	Honda	21	+12.278	4	5
12	40	(South Africa) Darryn Binder	KTM	21	+12.294	11	4
13	42	(Spain) Marcos Ramírez	KTM	21	+12.480	27	3
14	14	(Italy) Tony Arbolino	Honda	21	+12.620	24	2
15	6	(Spain) María Herrera	KTM	21	+13.083	20	1
16	8	(Italy) Nicolò Bulega	KTM	21	+14.393 (Note: 2-second penalty.)	2	
17	7	(Malaysia) Adam Norrodin	Honda	21	+18.861	21	
18	84	(Czech Republic) Jakub Kornfeil	Peugeot	21	+20.573	22	
19	12	(Italy) Marco Bezzecchi	Mahindra	21	+26.774	23	
20	71	(Japan) Ayumu Sasaki	Honda	21	+26.905	25	
21	96	(Italy) Manuel Pagliani	Mahindra	21	+27.400	31	
22	95	(France) Jules Danilo	Honda	21	+27.534	28	
23	64	(Netherlands) Bo Bendsneyder	KTM	21	+27.612	17	
24	41	(Thailand) Nakarin Atiratphuvapat	Honda	21	+35.218	29	
25	75	(Spain) Albert Arenas	Mahindra	21	+50.124	19	
26	4	(Finland) Patrik Pulkkinen	Peugeot	21	+1:18.379	30	
27	33	(Italy) Enea Bastianini	Honda	21	+1:20.064	15	
Ret	21	(Italy) Fabio Di Giannantonio	Honda	12	Accident	5	
Ret	48	(Italy) Lorenzo Dalla Porta	Mahindra	12	Gearbox	26	
Ret	19	(Argentina) Gabriel Rodrigo	KTM	11	Accident	13	
Ret	23	(Italy) Niccolò Antonelli	KTM	1	Accident	14	
OFFICIAL MOTO3 REPORT

== Championship standings after the race ==
=== MotoGP ===
Below are the standings for the top five riders and constructors after round two has concluded.

Riders' Championship standings

Pos.	Rider	Points
1	(Spain) Maverick Viñales	50
2	(Italy) Valentino Rossi	36
3	(Italy) Andrea Dovizioso	20
4	(United Kingdom) Scott Redding	17
5	(United Kingdom) Cal Crutchlow	16

Constructors' Championship standings

Pos.	Constructor	Points
1	(Japan) Yamaha	50
2	(Italy) Ducati	33
3	(Japan) Honda	29
4	(Italy) Aprilia	10
5	(Japan) Suzuki	7

- Note: Only the top five positions are included for both sets of standings.

=== Moto2 ===
Pos.	Rider	Points
1	(Italy) Franco Morbidelli	50
2	(Switzerland) Thomas Lüthi	36
3	(Portugal) Miguel Oliveira	33
4	(Italy) Lorenzo Baldassarri	21
5	(Spain) Xavi Vierge	18
6	(Japan) Takaaki Nakagami	16
7	(Italy) Luca Marini	14
8	(Italy) Francesco Bagnaia	13
9	(Spain) Álex Márquez	11
10	(Italy) Simone Corsi	10

=== Moto3 ===
Pos.	Rider	Points
1	(Spain) Joan Mir	50
2	(United Kingdom) John McPhee	40
3	(Spain) Jorge Martín	32
4	(Italy) Andrea Migno	21
5	(Italy) Romano Fenati	20
6	(Spain) Arón Canet	18
7	(Belgium) Livio Loi	14
8	(Germany) Philipp Öttl	13
9	(Spain) Marcos Ramírez	10
10	(Italy) Niccolò Antonelli	9

== Notes ==
Previous race: 2017 Qatar Grand Prix	FIM Grand Prix World Championship; 2017 season	Next race: 2017 Grand Prix of the Americas
Previous race: 2016 Argentine Grand Prix	Argentine Republic motorcycle Grand Prix	Next race: 2018 Argentine Grand Prix
