= 2018 Argentine Republic motorcycle Grand Prix =

Motorcycle Race in Argentina

(Argentina) 2018 Argentine Republic Grand Prix
Race details
- Race 2 of 19 races in the 2018 Grand Prix motorcycle racing season
- Date: 8 April 2018
- Official name: Gran Premio Motul de la República Argentina
- Location: Autódromo Termas de Río Hondo, Santiago del Estero, Argentina
- Course: Permanent racing facility; 4.806 km (2.986 mi)

MotoGP
Pole position
Rider	(Australia) Jack Miller	Ducati
Time	1:47.153	
Fastest lap
Rider	(Spain) Marc Márquez	Honda
Time	1:39.902 on lap 22	
Podium
First	(United Kingdom) Cal Crutchlow	Honda
Second	(France) Johann Zarco	Yamaha
Third	(Spain) Álex Rins	Suzuki

Moto2
Pole position
Rider	(Spain) Xavi Vierge	Kalex
Time	1:56.137	
Fastest lap
Rider	(Spain) Xavi Vierge	Kalex
Time	1:44.329 on lap 21	
Podium
First	(Italy) Mattia Pasini	Kalex
Second	(Spain) Xavi Vierge	Kalex
Third	(Portugal) Miguel Oliveira	KTM

Moto3
Pole position
Rider	(Italy) Tony Arbolino	Honda
Time	1:53.782	
Fastest lap
Rider	(Spain) Jorge Martín	Honda
Time	1:55.968 on lap 18	
Podium
First	(Italy) Marco Bezzecchi	KTM
Second	(Spain) Arón Canet	Honda
Third	(Italy) Fabio Di Giannantonio	Honda

The 2018 Argentine Republic motorcycle Grand Prix was the second round of the 2018 MotoGP season. It was held at the Autódromo Termas de Río Hondo in Santiago del Estero on 8 April 2018. In the MotoGP class, Jack Miller scored his first MotoGP pole position.

Having been declared a wet race at the time of the sighting lap, all but one rider selected rain tires. Pole-sitter Jack Miller being the only rider to initially go out on slick tires. Prior to the warm-up lap, every rider on rain tires elected to return to the pits to change to slick tires. Returning to the pits after the sighting lap usually results in the rider starting the race from pit-lane, however, the race officials deemed it a safety concern to have all but one rider start from pit-lane. The start of the race was delayed due to the unusual situation. Eventually, the grid was reset positioning the entire field in their original qualifying positions, but filling the grid from the rear. The result was Jack Miller (who didn't return to the pits for a tire change) in the first position on the grid and the other riders in formation several rows back.

After the warm-up lap, Marc Márquez stalled his motorcycle while lining up on the grid. Attempting to restart his bike, Márquez pushed the motorcycle away from his grid position. He was successful in restarting the stalled motorcycle, but race officials ran out and instructed him to return to pit-lane. Márquez ignored the race officials' instructions, proceeded to ride his motorcycle back in the opposite direction toward his original starting position and rejoined the rest of the riders who were all waiting for the race start. After jumping to an early lead, Marc Márquez was issued a ride-through penalty for riding his motorcycle in the opposite direction on the track. Rejoining near the back of the field, Márquez began advancing position passing slower riders. In his attempt to regain positions, Márquez was issued a second penalty when he collided into Aleix Espargaró being required to drop a position for irresponsible riding. Márquez earned his third penalty of the race for crashing into yet another rider. This time he collided into Valentino Rossi in the closing stages of the race, resulting in Rossi being pushed onto the wet grass where he fell. Rossi was able to remount and finish the race, but was unable to secure any points after being taken out by Márquez. Márquez continued to finish the race in 5th position, which would have earned 11 championship points, but receiving a 30-second time penalty after the race for crashing into Rossi put him outside of a points earning position. In this race, Marc Márquez earned 3 separate penalties.

In the closing laps there were multiple passes for the podium positions between Zarco, Rins and Crutchlow as the riders struggled with tire wear and damp patches on the track.

Cal Crutchlow took Honda's 750th victory and became the first non-factory rider to lead the championship since Sete Gibernau in the 2004 Catalan Grand Prix, as well as the first British rider to lead the championship since Barry Sheene in 1979. Repsol Honda failed to score for the first time since the previous year's event.

== Classification ==
=== MotoGP ===
Pos.	No.	Rider	Team	Manufacturer	Laps	Time/Retired	Grid	Points
1	35	(United Kingdom) Cal Crutchlow	LCR Honda Castrol	Honda	24	40:36.342	10	25
2	5	(France) Johann Zarco	Monster Yamaha Tech 3	Yamaha	24	+0.251	3	20
3	42	(Spain) Álex Rins	Team Suzuki Ecstar	Suzuki	24	+2.501	5	16
4	43	(Australia) Jack Miller	Alma Pramac Racing	Ducati	24	+4.390	1	13
5	25	(Spain) Maverick Viñales	Movistar Yamaha MotoGP	Yamaha	24	+14.941	9	11
6	4	(Italy) Andrea Dovizioso	Ducati Team	Ducati	24	+22.533	8	10
7	53	(Spain) Tito Rabat	Reale Avintia Racing	Ducati	24	+23.026	4	9
8	29	(Italy) Andrea Iannone	Team Suzuki Ecstar	Suzuki	24	+23.921	12	8
9	55	(Malaysia) Hafizh Syahrin	Monster Yamaha Tech 3	Yamaha	24	+24.311	23	7
10	9	(Italy) Danilo Petrucci	Alma Pramac Racing	Ducati	24	+26.003	18	6
11	44	(Spain) Pol Espargaró	Red Bull KTM Factory Racing	KTM	24	+31.022	16	5
12	45	(United Kingdom) Scott Redding	Aprilia Racing Team Gresini	Aprilia	24	+31.891	15	4
13	30	(Japan) Takaaki Nakagami	LCR Honda Idemitsu	Honda	24	+32.452	24	3
14	21	(Italy) Franco Morbidelli	EG 0,0 Marc VDS	Honda	24	+42.061	22	2
15	99	(Spain) Jorge Lorenzo	Ducati Team	Ducati	24	+42.274	14	1
16	19	(Spain) Álvaro Bautista	Ángel Nieto Team	Ducati	24	+42.625	19	
17	12	(Switzerland) Thomas Lüthi	EG 0,0 Marc VDS	Honda	24	+43.350	20	
18	93	(Spain) Marc Márquez	Repsol Honda Team	Honda	24	+43.860 (Note: 30-second penalty.)	6	
19	46	(Italy) Valentino Rossi	Movistar Yamaha MotoGP	Yamaha	24	+52.082	11	
20	17	(Czech Republic) Karel Abraham	Ángel Nieto Team	Ducati	24	+1:03.944	13	
21	10	(Belgium) Xavier Siméon	Reale Avintia Racing	Ducati	24	+1:10.144	17	
Ret	38	(United Kingdom) Bradley Smith	Red Bull KTM Factory Racing	KTM	17	Accident	21	
Ret	41	(Spain) Aleix Espargaró	Aprilia Racing Team Gresini	Aprilia	13	Electronics	7	
Ret	26	(Spain) Dani Pedrosa	Repsol Honda Team	Honda	0	Accident	2	

=== Moto2 ===
Pos.	No.	Rider	Manufacturer	Laps	Time/Retired	Grid	Points
1	54	(Italy) Mattia Pasini	Kalex	23	40:37.538	4	25
2	97	(Spain) Xavi Vierge	Kalex	23	+0.850	1	20
3	44	(Portugal) Miguel Oliveira	KTM	23	+1.414	7	16
4	7	(Italy) Lorenzo Baldassarri	Kalex	23	+5.178	2	13
5	73	(Spain) Álex Márquez	Kalex	23	+5.431	8	11
6	87	(Australia) Remy Gardner	Tech 3	23	+10.425	9	10
7	36	(Spain) Joan Mir	Kalex	23	+13.379	17	9
8	77	(Switzerland) Dominique Aegerter	KTM	23	+13.460	11	8
9	42	(Italy) Francesco Bagnaia	Kalex	23	+22.038	15	7
10	23	(Germany) Marcel Schrötter	Kalex	23	+22.867	20	6
11	27	(Spain) Iker Lecuona	KTM	23	+24.102	21	5
12	52	(United Kingdom) Danny Kent	Speed Up	23	+25.972	3	4
13	22	(United Kingdom) Sam Lowes	KTM	23	+26.010	6	3
14	32	(Spain) Isaac Viñales	Kalex	23	+31.769	13	2
15	5	(Italy) Andrea Locatelli	Kalex	23	+33.264	26	1
16	10	(Italy) Luca Marini	Kalex	23	+33.828	12	
17	45	(Japan) Tetsuta Nagashima	Kalex	23	+48.603	23	
18	4	(South Africa) Steven Odendaal	NTS	23	+50.651	14	
19	13	(Italy) Romano Fenati	Kalex	23	+51.594	19	
20	40	(Spain) Héctor Barberá	Kalex	23	+53.070	18	
21	62	(Italy) Stefano Manzi	Suter	23	+53.260	32	
22	20	(France) Fabio Quartararo	Speed Up	23	+56.979	28	
23	24	(Italy) Simone Corsi	Kalex	23	+59.266	22	
24	89	(Malaysia) Khairul Idham Pawi	Kalex	23	+1:10.121	27	
25	16	(United States) Joe Roberts	NTS	23	+1:12.051	10	
26	63	(Malaysia) Zulfahmi Khairuddin	Kalex	23	+1:32.993	31	
27	21	(Italy) Federico Fuligni	Kalex	23	+1:33.218	30	
28	64	(Netherlands) Bo Bendsneyder	Tech 3	23	+1:36.078	25	
29	51	(Brazil) Eric Granado	Suter	23	+1:38.951	24	
Ret	9	(Spain) Jorge Navarro	Kalex	3	Exhaust	5	
Ret	41	(South Africa) Brad Binder	KTM	1	Collision	16	
Ret	95	(France) Jules Danilo	Kalex	1	Retired	29	

=== Moto3 ===
Pos.	No.	Rider	Manufacturer	Laps	Time/Retired	Grid	Points
1	12	(Italy) Marco Bezzecchi	KTM	21	41:43.822	2	25
2	44	(Spain) Arón Canet	Honda	21	+4.689	8	20
3	21	(Italy) Fabio Di Giannantonio	Honda	21	+4.963	6	16
4	33	(Italy) Enea Bastianini	Honda	21	+5.818	5	13
5	7	(Malaysia) Adam Norrodin	Honda	21	+9.112	4	11
6	72	(Spain) Alonso López	Honda	21	+13.349	21	10
7	48	(Italy) Lorenzo Dalla Porta	Honda	21	+13.925	15	9
8	23	(Italy) Niccolò Antonelli	Honda	21	+14.363	7	8
9	19	(Argentina) Gabriel Rodrigo	KTM	21	+16.573	3	7
10	14	(Italy) Tony Arbolino	Honda	21	+24.299	1	6
11	88	(Spain) Jorge Martín	Honda	21	+25.373	9	5
12	42	(Spain) Marcos Ramírez	KTM	21	+26.060	26	4
13	16	(Italy) Andrea Migno	KTM	21	+26.376	10	3
14	84	(Czech Republic) Jakub Kornfeil	KTM	21	+26.488	18	2
15	11	(Belgium) Livio Loi	KTM	21	+26.537	16	1
16	71	(Japan) Ayumu Sasaki	Honda	21	+29.252	13	
17	17	(United Kingdom) John McPhee	KTM	21	+32.937	22	
18	41	(Thailand) Nakarin Atiratphuvapat	Honda	21	+33.892	23	
19	27	(Japan) Kaito Toba	Honda	21	+37.665	24	
20	22	(Japan) Kazuki Masaki	KTM	21	+38.202	17	
21	24	(Japan) Tatsuki Suzuki	Honda	21	+1:02.305	19	
22	40	(South Africa) Darryn Binder	KTM	21	+1:17.384	25	
23	65	(Germany) Philipp Öttl	KTM	21	+1:36.986	20	
24	76	(Kazakhstan) Makar Yurchenko	KTM	20	+1 lap	28	
Ret	5	(Spain) Jaume Masiá	KTM	19	Accident	11	
Ret	10	(Italy) Dennis Foggia	KTM	18	Accident	14	
Ret	75	(Spain) Albert Arenas	KTM	17	Accident	12	
Ret	8	(Italy) Nicolò Bulega	KTM	16	Handling	27	

== Championship standings after the race ==
=== MotoGP ===
Pos.	Rider	Points
1	(United Kingdom) Cal Crutchlow	38
2	(Italy) Andrea Dovizioso	35
3	(France) Johann Zarco	28
4	(Spain) Maverick Viñales	21
5	(Spain) Marc Márquez	20
6	(Australia) Jack Miller	19
7	(Italy) Danilo Petrucci	17
8	(Italy) Valentino Rossi	16
9	(Spain) Álex Rins	16
10	(Italy) Andrea Iannone	15

=== Moto2 ===
Pos.	Rider	Points
1	(Italy) Mattia Pasini	38
2	(Italy) Lorenzo Baldassarri	33
3	(Italy) Francesco Bagnaia	32
4	(Spain) Xavi Vierge	28
5	(Portugal) Miguel Oliveira	27
6	(Spain) Álex Márquez	27
7	(Germany) Marcel Schrötter	15
8	(Australia) Remy Gardner	14
9	(Spain) Joan Mir	14
10	(South Africa) Brad Binder	10

=== Moto3 ===
Pos.	Rider	Points
1	(Spain) Arón Canet	40
2	(Spain) Jorge Martín	30
3	(Italy) Marco Bezzecchi	27
4	(Italy) Fabio Di Giannantonio	26
5	(Italy) Lorenzo Dalla Porta	25
6	(Italy) Niccolò Antonelli	21
7	(Argentina) Gabriel Rodrigo	18
8	(Malaysia) Adam Norrodin	16
9	(Italy) Enea Bastianini	13
10	(Spain) Alonso López	10

== Notes ==
Previous race: 2018 Qatar Grand Prix	FIM Grand Prix World Championship; 2018 season	Next race: 2018 Grand Prix of the Americas
Previous race: 2017 Argentine Grand Prix	Argentine Republic motorcycle Grand Prix	Next race: 2019 Argentine Grand Prix
