= Álex Márquez =

Spanish motorcycle racer (born 1996)

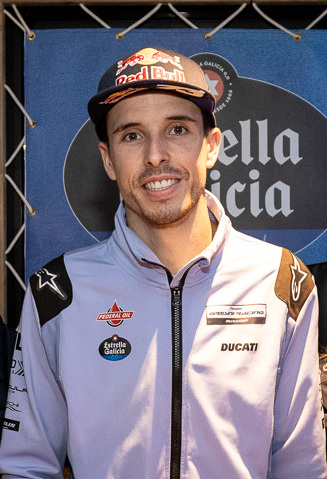
- Márquez in 2023
- Nationality: Spanish
- Born: 23 April 1996 (age 30); Cervera, Spain
- Current team: BK8 Gresini Racing MotoGP
- Bike number: 73
- Website: alexmarquez73.com/en/
Motorcycle racing career statistics
MotoGP World Championship
Active years	2020–
Manufacturers	Honda (2020–2022); Ducati (2023–2026)
Championships	0
2025 championship position	2nd (467 pts)
Starts / Wins / Podiums / Poles / F. laps / Points; 126 / 4 / 20 / 3 / 8 / 1208
Moto2 World Championship
Active years	2015–2019
Manufacturers	Kalex
Championships	1 (2019)
2019 championship position	1st (262 pts)
Starts / Wins / Podiums / Poles / F. laps / Points; 89 / 8 / 23 / 12 / 10 / 778
Moto3 World Championship
Active years	2012–2014
Manufacturers	Suter Honda (2012); KTM (2013); Honda (2014)
Championships	1 (2014)
2014 championship position	1st (278 pts)
Starts / Wins / Podiums / Poles / F. laps / Points; 46 / 4 / 15 / 3 / 7 / 518

Álex Márquez Alentà (born 23 April 1996) is a Spanish Grand Prix motorcycle road racer who races for the Ducati satellite team Gresini Racing in MotoGP. He finished as championship runner-up in the 2025 season. He has won two world titles: the 2014 Moto3 World Championship and the 2019 Moto2 World Championship.

Márquez made his debut in the MotoGP class for the truncated 2020 season. He had been contracted to continue in Moto2, but Jorge Lorenzo's unexpected retirement made a seat available in MotoGP at the Repsol Honda team, opposite Márquez's older brother Marc. Márquez was demoted to satellite Honda team LCR for the next two seasons. In 2023 he switched manufacturers to join Gresini, where his performance improved. He finished ninth in the championship standings in 2023, and eighth in 2024. In 2025, Márquez had a career-best season: he won his maiden MotoGP race at Jerez, followed by victories in Catalonia and Malaysia, and finished as championship runner-up. In a historic first for Grand Prix motorcycle racing, he and Marc became the first siblings to place first and second in any class of the Grand Prix motorcycle racing World Championship. Márquez is set to leave Gresini at the end of 2026 to join the KTM factory team.

== Career ==
=== Early career ===
Márquez began the 2010 season in the CEV Buckler 125cc championship, competing with the Monlau Competición team, along with Álex Rins and Niklas Ajo. Márquez did not participate in the opening round at Circuit de Barcelona-Catalunya, as he was not old enough to do so – he did not turn fourteen until five days after the event. He finished eleventh in his first start at Albacete, having qualified tenth. He retired at Jerez due to clutch problems. He added finishes of seventh and sixth at Motorland Aragón and Albacete, before retiring from the final two races at Valencia and Jerez. He finished eleventh in the final riders' championship standings.

In 2011, Márquez battled with Rins for the title, with the championship honours ultimately going to Rins. Márquez won two races during the season – at Motorland Aragón and Albacete – and finished the season as runner-up, 12 points in arrears to Rins. With the championship changing to Moto3 regulations for the 2012 season, Márquez again won two races, at Albacete and Navarra; he won the championship with a fourth-place finish at Albacete.

=== Moto3 World Championship ===
==== Ambrogio Next Racing (2012) ====
Márquez made his world championship debut as a wildcard at the 2012 Spanish Grand Prix. In difficult weather conditions, Márquez scored points with a twelfth-place finish. He also made wildcard appearances at Estoril and Catalunya, scoring points on both occasions, with fifteenth and sixth respectively. After the mid-season break, Márquez moved into the series full-time from the Indianapolis Grand Prix onwards with Ambrogio Racing, replacing Simone Grotzkyj. He scored points in four of the remaining eight races, and ultimately finished the season in twentieth place in the riders' championship.

==== Estrella Galicia 0,0 (2013–2014) ====
In 2013, the Estrella Galicia 0,0 team moved to KTM machinery, with Márquez joining Rins in the team full-time. After predominantly finishing fourth or fifth in the races during the first half of the season, Márquez achieved his first podium finish at the Indianapolis Grand Prix with a second-place finish behind Rins. Márquez recorded three consecutive third-place finishes at Silverstone, Misano, and Motorland Aragón, before taking his first career victory at the Japanese Grand Prix. He finished the season in fourth position in the final championship standings.

In 2014, Márquez and Rins remained in the series and were initially viewed as the championship favourites. However, they were quickly usurped by Ajo Motorsport rider Jack Miller, who won three of the opening five races. Márquez took successive wins in Catalunya and the Netherlands to reduce the deficit from 44 points to 7. Márquez started a run of five top-two finishes at the British Grand Prix, including another victory at Motegi, which saw him move into the championship lead ahead over Miller and open up a 25-point gap. Despite Miller winning two of the final three races, a third-place finish at the final round in Valencia saw Márquez clinch the title by two points. As a result, he and brother Marc became the first siblings to win motorcycling Grand Prix world titles.

=== Moto2 World Championship ===
==== EG 0,0 Marc VDS (2015–2019) ====
===== 2015 =====
For the 2015 season, Márquez moved up to the Moto2 World Championship with the Estrella Galicia 0,0 Marc VDS team. His best race finishes were consecutive fourth places at Brno and Silverstone, and he finished 14th in the standings.

===== 2016 =====
Márquez had an uneven season in 2016. Despite seven race DNFs, he scored his first Moto2 podium in Aragon, and ended the year in a slightly improved 13th position.

===== 2017 =====
2017 was a breakthrough year for Márquez. At the fourth round of the season in Jerez, he won his first Moto2 race. He took further victories in Catalonia and Misano, as well as three additional podium finishes. He finished the season ranked fourth in the standings.

===== 2018 =====
2018 saw no race victories for Márquez, but reasonable consistency. He finished in the top five in ten out of eighteen races, enough to ensure he finished the championship in fourth place again.

===== 2019 =====
Márquez had an excellent season in 2019. In the middle of the season he hit a run of good form and took three consecutive victories in Le Mans, Mugello, and Catalonia. He retired in Assen before securing another two consecutive race wins in Germany and Brno. Combined with five additional podiums, this was enough to ensure he won the championship. He became the first rider to win championships in both the rebranded Moto3 and Moto2 classes. His brother Marc won the MotoGP championship, securing a second double championship haul for the siblings.

=== MotoGP World Championship ===
==== Repsol Honda Team (2020) ====
===== 2020 =====
Márquez was contracted to continue with Marc VDS in Moto2 for the 2020 season. However, Jorge Lorenzo belatedly announced his retirement in November 2019, opening up a seat in MotoGP at Repsol Honda alongside Márquez's brother Marc. As Moto2 contracts can be broken if the rider is offered a place in MotoGP, Márquez replaced Lorenzo, and his Moto2 seat was given to Augusto Fernández.

Márquez had a difficult start in MotoGP: the season was truncated due to the COVID-19 pandemic, his brother sat out almost the entire season due to injury, and the Honda RC213V was difficult to ride. Márquez took second place finishes in Le Mans and Aragon, but his season was otherwise underwhelming and he finished 14th in the standings.

Márquez was dropped by Repsol Honda at the end of the season and replaced by Pol Espargaró.

==== LCR Honda Castrol (2021–2022) ====
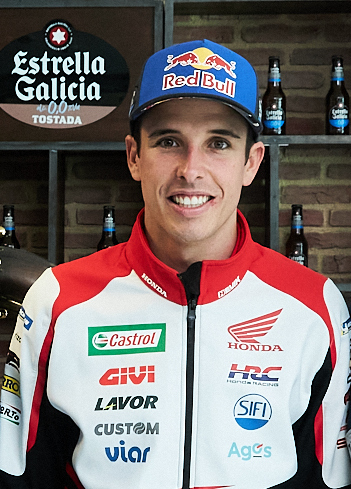
Márquez in 2022

===== 2021 =====
For the 2021 season, Márquez joined the satellite LCR Honda team, partnering Takaaki Nakagami. He suffered six DNFs across the season, with his best race finish a fourth place in the penultimate round of the season. He finished in 16th place in the standings, one position behind his teammate.

===== 2022 =====
Márquez remained with LCR for the 2022 season. His best race position all season was seventh in Portugal. He finished 17th in the standings, one position ahead of his teammate and one position behind factory Honda rider Espargaró. The RC213V had become extremely uncompetitive.

==== Gresini Racing MotoGP (2023–2026) ====
===== 2023 =====
Márquez switched manufacturers for the 2023 season, joining Ducati satellite team Gresini to partner Fabio Di Giannantonio. The Ducati was much more competitive, and Márquez scored a podium in just his second race with Gresini in Argentina. He scored a second podium in Malaysia, and scored sprint race wins in Silverstone and Malaysia. He finished the championship in ninth place.

===== 2024 =====
For the 2024 season, Márquez was joined at Gresini by his brother Marc. Márquez finished third in Germany, while his brother finished second, making them the first siblings to stand on a MotoGP podium together since 1997. This was Márquez's sole podium, but he had a fairly consistent season and finished in eighth place, ahead of three other Ducatis.

===== 2025 =====
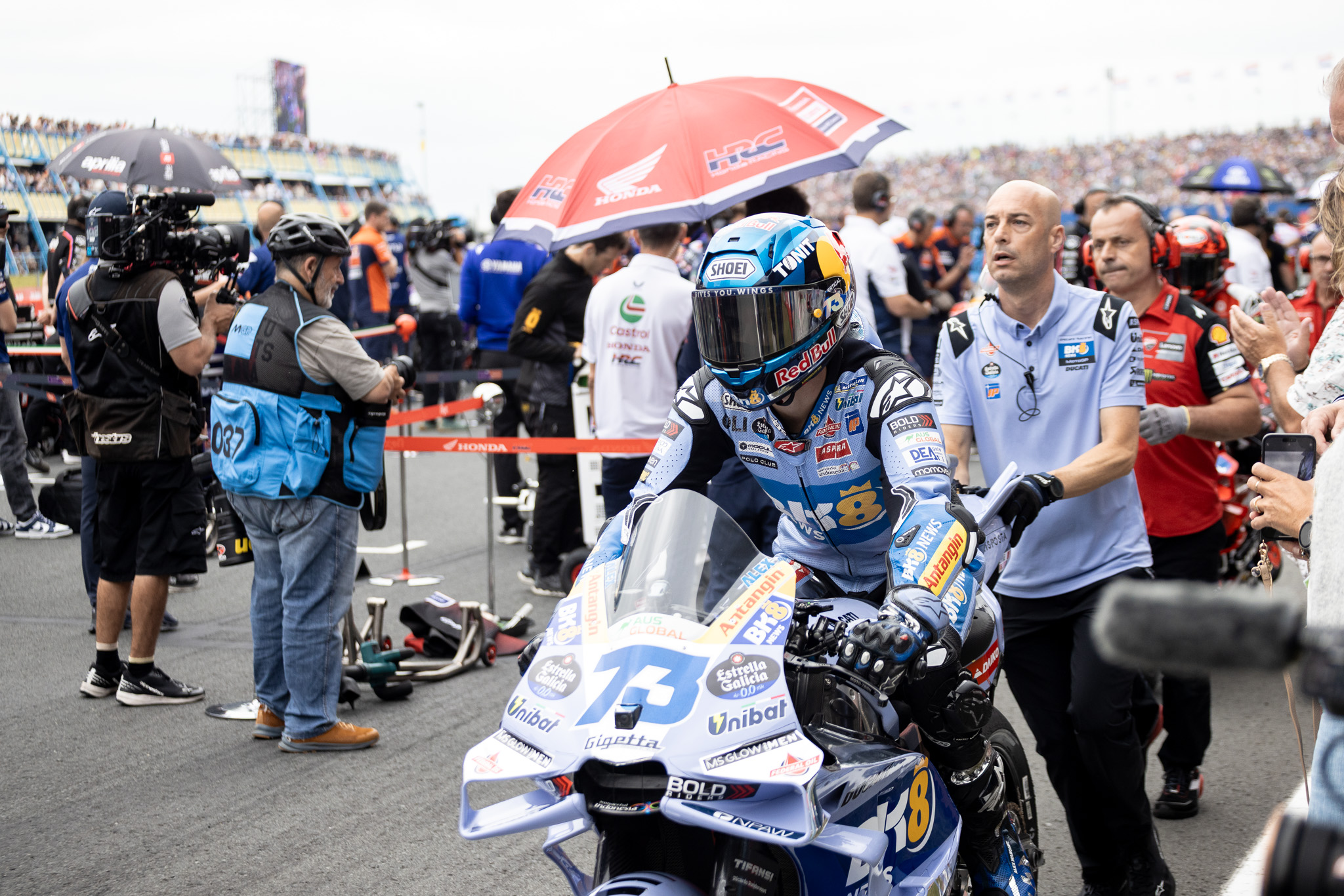
Márquez arriving at the grid before the start of 2025 Dutch TT

For the 2025 season, Márquez partnered rookie Fermín Aldeguer, as Marc had moved to the factory Ducati team. Márquez was riding a year-old GP24 Ducati, but it had dominated the previous year's championship and was highly competitive with the new GP25 spec. He made a stunning start to the season, achieving three double second places in the main races and sprints of the first three rounds. At the fifth round in Jerez, Márquez won his first race in MotoGP. His good form continued with a sprint race victory at Silverstone and three more second places in the main races in Aragon, Mugello, and Germany.

It soon became clear that Márquez was, unexpectedly, his brother's closest rival for the championship. He won a second race in Catalonia, but a sixth-place finish in Motegi ended his chances for the title. His performance tailed off slightly in the last part of the year: despite his brother's absence from the last four rounds, Márquez only took one more main race victory in Malaysia. Nevertheless, he easily finished the championship as runner-up, over a hundred points clear of third-placed Marco Bezzecchi. Marc and Álex became the first siblings to finish 1–2 in any class of the Grand Prix motorcycle racing World Championship.

===== 2026 =====
Márquez remained at Gresini for the 2026 season, now on factory machinery. He struggled across the first few rounds before taking a surprise victory in Jerez. In Catalonia, one of his most successful circuits, he claimed victory in the sprint by 0.041 seconds over Pedro Acosta, the closest sprint finish in history. In the main race, Márquez was running in second when Acosta's KTM malfunctioned and suddenly lost power on the straight. Márquez slammed into his bike and was thrown towards the barriers in a violent crash. He fractured his neck and collarbone, and underwent surgery on the latter. He accordingly did not start the next three races to recover.

Márquez completed his first race weekend back in Assen, where he finished an impressive fifth. At the next round in Germany, he finished second in the sprint, and was running in second in the main race when he slid out of the final corner on lap nine. Márquez was the fastest Ducati in Silverstone, and was hounding Marco Bezzecchi for a podium finish in the main race when he made a braking error and slipped back into fifth; he recovered to finish fourth. He took a second place finish in the sprint in Aragon.

In Misano, Márquez qualified in P9 after a pair of crashes but made an impressive comeback in the main race to finish second. This was his first main race podium since his win in Jerez. He was less successful across the next few weekends. He crashed out of the main race in Austria. In Japan, he received a double long lap penalty after triggering an incident with Pedro Acosta and Fabio Di Giannantonio which caused all three riders to crash out of the sprint. He then crashed out of the main race. In Mandalika, he finished the sprint in fifth and the main race in seventh.

==== Red Bull KTM Factory Racing (2027–) ====
===== 2027 =====
For the 2027 season, Márquez switched to Red Bull KTM Factory Racing on a multi-year deal, reuniting with former Gresini teammate Fabio Di Giannantonio.

== Career statistics ==
=== CEV Buckler Moto3 Championship ===
==== Races by year ====
(key) (Races in bold indicate pole position, races in italics indicate fastest lap)

Year	Bike	1	2	3	4	5	6	7	Pos	Pts
2012	Suter Honda	JER; Ret	**NAV**; 1	ARA; 2	CAT; 2	**ALB1**; 1	ALB2; 4	VAL	1st	103

=== Grand Prix motorcycle racing ===
==== By season ====
Season	Class	Motorcycle	Team	Race	Win	Podium	Pole	FLap	Pts	Plcd	WCh
2012	Moto3	Suter Honda	Estrella Galicia 0,0	3	0	0	0	1	27	20th	–
2012	Moto3	Suter Honda	Ambrogio Next Racing	8	0	0	0	0	27	20th	–
2013	Moto3	KTM	Estrella Galicia 0,0	17	1	5	0	3	213	4th	–
2014	Moto3	Honda	Estrella Galicia 0,0	18	3	10	3	3	278	**1st**	1
2015	Moto2	Kalex	EG 0,0 Marc VDS	18	0	0	0	0	73	14th	–
2016	Moto2	Kalex	EG 0,0 Marc VDS	17	0	1	0	0	69	13th	–
2017	Moto2	Kalex	EG 0,0 Marc VDS	17	3	6	3	3	201	4th	–
2018	Moto2	Kalex	EG 0,0 Marc VDS	18	0	6	3	2	173	4th	–
2019	Moto2	Kalex	EG 0,0 Marc VDS	19	5	10	6	5	262	**1st**	1
2020	MotoGP	Honda	Repsol Honda Team	14	0	2	0	0	74	14th	–
2021	MotoGP	Honda	LCR Honda Castrol	18	0	0	0	0	70	16th	–
2022	MotoGP	Honda	LCR Honda Castrol	20	0	0	0	0	50	17th	–
2023	MotoGP	Ducati	Gresini Racing MotoGP	17	0	2	1	2	177	9th	–
2024	MotoGP	Ducati	Gresini Racing MotoGP	20	0	1	0	0	173	8th	–
2025	MotoGP	Ducati	BK8 Gresini Racing MotoGP	22	3	12	1	5	467	**2nd**	–
2026	MotoGP	Ducati	BK8 Gresini Racing MotoGP	15	1	3	1	1	197*	8th*	–
Total				**261**	**16**	**58**	**18**	**25**	**2504**		**2**

==== By class ====
Class	Seasons	1st GP	1st pod	1st win	Race	Win	Podiums	Pole	FLap	Pts	WChmp
Moto3	2012–2014	2012 Spain	2013 Indianapolis	2013 Japan	46	4	15	3	7	518	1
Moto2	2015–2019	2015 Qatar	2016 Aragon	2017 Spain	89	8	23	12	10	778	1
MotoGP	2020–present	2020 Spain	2020 France	2025 Spain	126	4	20	3	8	1208	0
Total	2012–present				**261**	**16**	**58**	**18**	**25**	**2504**	**2**

==== Races by year ====
(key) (Races in bold indicate pole position; races in italics indicate fastest lap; ^{superscript} indicates point-scoring sprint position)

Year	Class	Bike	1	2	3	4	5	6	7	8	9	10	11	12	13	14	15	16	17	18	19	20	21	22	Pos	Pts
2012	Moto3	Suter Honda	QAT	SPA; 12	POR; 15	FRA	CAT; 6	GBR	NED	GER	ITA	INP; Ret	CZE; 21	RSM; Ret	ARA; 15	JPN; 14	MAL; 14	AUS; 9	VAL; Ret						20th	27
2013	Moto3	KTM	QAT; 4	AME; Ret	SPA; 23	FRA; 5	ITA; 5	CAT; 4	NED; 5	GER; 5	INP; 2	CZE; 5	GBR; 3	RSM; 3	ARA; 3	MAL; 4	AUS; 4	JPN; 1	VAL; 4						4th	213
2014	Moto3	Honda	QAT; 2	AME; Ret	ARG; 2	SPA; 7	FRA; 5	ITA; Ret	**CAT**; 1	NED; 1	GER; 4	INP; 6	**CZE**; 4	GBR; 2	RSM; 2	ARA; 2	JPN; 1	**AUS**; 2	MAL; 5	VAL; 3					1st	278
2015	Moto2	Kalex	QAT; 11	AME; 15	ARG; 15	SPA; 9	FRA; Ret	ITA; 12	CAT; 11	NED; 9	GER; 18	INP; 10	CZE; 4	GBR; 4	RSM; Ret	ARA; Ret	JPN; 18	AUS; 9	MAL; Ret	VAL; 12					14th	73
2016	Moto2	Kalex	QAT; Ret	ARG; Ret	AME; 11	SPA; Ret	FRA; Ret	ITA; 16	CAT; 18	NED; 8	GER; Ret	AUT; 6	CZE; 5	GBR; 25	RSM; 10	ARA; 2	JPN; Ret	AUS; DNS	MAL; 7	VAL; Ret					13th	69
2017	Moto2	Kalex	QAT; 5	ARG; 21	AME; 4	**SPA**; 1	FRA; 4	ITA; 3	**CAT**; 1	NED; 6	GER; Ret	CZE; 2	AUT; 2	GBR; 14	RSM; DNS	ARA; Ret	JPN; 1	AUS; 6	MAL; Ret	**VAL**; 5					4th	201
2018	Moto2	Kalex	**QAT**; 3	ARG; 5	**AME**; 2	SPA; Ret	FRA; 2	ITA; 5	CAT; 3	NED; 3	GER; 13	CZE; Ret	AUT; Ret	GBR; C	RSM; 18	ARA; 4	THA; Ret	JPN; 4	AUS; 7	**MAL**; 7	VAL; 3				4th	173
2019	Moto2	Kalex	QAT; 7	ARG; 3	AME; 5	SPA; 24	FRA; 1	ITA; 1	CAT; 1	NED; Ret	**GER**; 1	**CZE**; 1	AUT; 2	**GBR**; Ret	RSM; 3	**ARA**; 3	**THA**; 5	JPN; 6	AUS; 8	**MAL**; 2	VAL; 30				1st	262
2020	MotoGP	Honda	SPA; 12	ANC; 8	CZE; 15	AUT; 14	STY; 16	RSM; 17	EMI; 7	CAT; 13	FRA; 2	ARA; 2	TER; Ret	EUR; Ret	VAL; 16	POR; 9									14th	74
2021	MotoGP	Honda	QAT; Ret	DOH; Ret	POR; 8	SPA; Ret	FRA; 6	ITA; 14	CAT; 11	GER; Ret	NED; 14	STY; 9	AUT; 9	GBR; 8	ARA; Ret	RSM; 15	AME; 12	EMI; Ret	ALR; 4	VAL; 13					16th	70
2022	MotoGP	Honda	QAT; Ret	INA; 13	ARG; 15	AME; Ret	POR; 7	SPA; 13	FRA; 14	ITA; 14	CAT; 10	GER; Ret	NED; 15	GBR; 17	AUT; 14	RSM; 10	ARA; 12	JPN; 13	THA; 8	AUS; Ret	MAL; 17	VAL; 17			17th	50
2023	MotoGP	Ducati	POR; 5^{9}	**ARG**; 3^{5}	AME; Ret	SPA; 8	FRA; Ret	ITA; Ret	GER; 7^{8}	NED; 6^{9}	GBR; Ret^{1}	AUT; 5^{4}	CAT; 6	RSM; 11^{9}	IND; DNS	JPN	INA; DNS	AUS; 9	THA; Ret^{8}	MAL; 2^{1}	QAT; 6^{4}	VAL; 6^{8}			9th	177
2024	MotoGP	Ducati	QAT; 6^{7}	POR; Ret	AME; 15	SPA; 4	FRA; 10	CAT; 7	ITA; 9^{8}	NED; 7^{8}	GER; 3^{9}	GBR; 7^{6}	AUT; 10	ARA; Ret^{4}	RSM; 6	EMI; 9	INA; Ret	JPN; Ret^{7}	AUS; 15	THA; 10^{5}	MAL; 4^{4}	SLD; 4^{5}			8th	173
2025	MotoGP	Ducati	THA; 2^{2}	ARG; 2^{2}	AME; 2^{2}	QAT; 6^{2}	SPA; 1^{2}	FRA; Ret^{2}	GBR; 5^{1}	ARA; 2^{2}	ITA; 2^{2}	NED; Ret^{2}	GER; 2^{8}	CZE; Ret	AUT; 10^{2}	HUN; 14^{8}	**CAT**; 1	RSM; 3^{2}	JPN; 6	INA; 3^{4}	AUS; 4^{6}	MAL; 1^{2}	POR; 2^{1}	VAL; 6^{1}	2nd	467
2026	MotoGP	Ducati	THA; Ret	BRA; 6^{7}	USA; 7^{4}	SPA; 1	FRA; Ret^{8}	CAT; Ret^{1}	ITA	HUN	CZE; DNS	NED; 5	GER; Ret^{2}	GBR; 4^{4}	ARA; 4^{2}	RSM; 2^{5}	AUT; Ret^{5}	JPN; Ret	INA; 7^{5}	AUS; C^{2}	**MAL**; 3	QAT	POR	VAL	8th*	197*

* Season still in progress.

== Personal life ==
Marquez is currently in a relationship with Gabriela Guzmàn.

Sporting positions
Preceded by Álex Rins	CEV Buckler Moto3 Champion; 2012	Succeeded by Fabio Quartararo
