= Álex Rins =

Spanish motorcycle racer (born 1995)

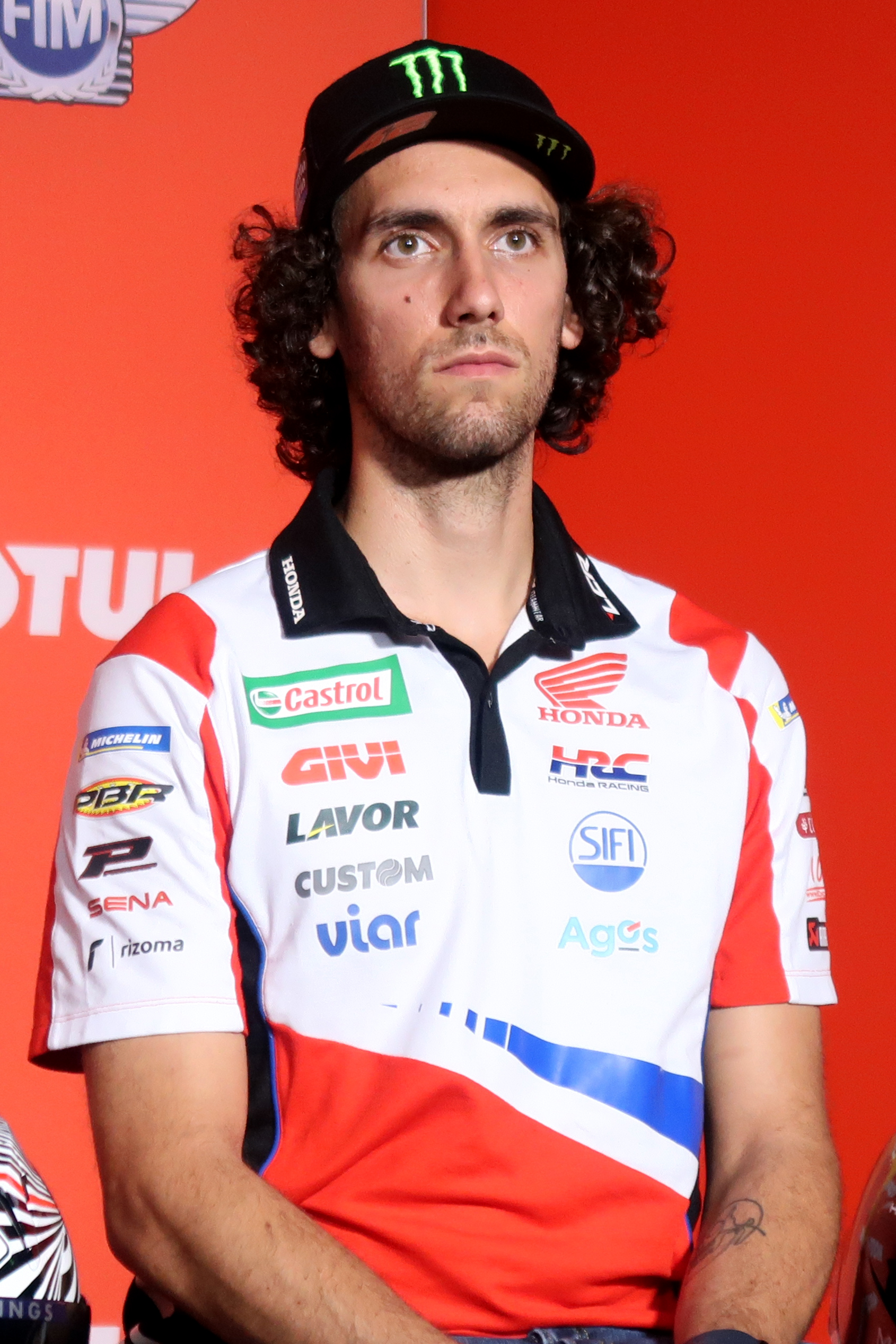
- Rins at the 2023 Japanese Grand Prix
- Nationality: Spanish
- Born: 8 December 1995 (age 30); Barcelona, Spain
- Current team: Monster Energy Yamaha MotoGP Team
- Bike number: 42
- Website: AlexRins.com
Motorcycle racing career statistics
MotoGP World Championship
Active years	2017–
Manufacturers	Suzuki (2017–2022); Honda (2023); Yamaha (2024–)
Championships	0
2025 championship position	19th (68 pts)
Starts / Wins / Podiums / Poles / F. laps / Points; 163 / 6 / 18 / 0 / 7 / 1026
Moto2 World Championship
Active years	2015–2016
Manufacturers	Kalex
Championships	0
2016 championship position	3rd (214 pts)
Starts / Wins / Podiums / Poles / F. laps / Points; 35 / 4 / 17 / 4 / 7 / 448
Moto3 World Championship
Active years	2012–2014
Manufacturers	Suter Honda (2012); KTM (2013); Honda (2014)
Championships	0
2014 championship position	3rd (237 pts)
Starts / Wins / Podiums / Poles / F. laps / Points; 52 / 8 / 23 / 13 / 5 / 689

Álex Rins Navarro (born 8 December 1995) is a Spanish Grand Prix motorcycle racer competing for the Monster Energy Yamaha MotoGP Team in the MotoGP class. He was the 2011 CEV Buckler 125 Junior GP Champion, and made his Grand Prix motorcycle racing debut in the Moto3 World Championship during the 2012 season. Rins is set to leave Yamaha at the 2026 season.

== Career ==
=== Moto3 World Championship (2012–2014) ===
Born in Barcelona, Rins began his career in Moto3 with the Estrella Galicia 0,0 team. In his second meeting, Rins took pole position for the Spanish Grand Prix. He took his first podium in France, with third place. He scored no further podiums, but was very consistent throughout the remainder of the season, regularly finishing in the top ten. He finished fifth in the final standings and became the rookie of the year.

Rins continued racing for Estrella Galicia 0,0 alongside Álex Márquez in 2013, which would prove to be his breakthrough year. Maverick Viñales, Luis Salom and Rins dominated the season, with Rins scoring six wins, 14 podiums and eight poles, and was in the running for the title throughout the season, finishing second to Viñales by a margin of 12 points.

Rins continued to race for Estrella Galicia 0,0 in 2014. The 2014 season saw a dip in Rins' performance with two wins, eight podiums and four poles which was lesser than his previous years' performance. Ultimately, Rins finished the season in third place in the riders' championship.

=== Moto2 World Championship (2015–2016) ===
==== Paginas Amarillas HP 40 (2015–2016) ====
Rins moved to Moto2 for 2015 with the Paginas Amarillas HP 40 team riding a Kalex. He sported the racing number 40, for the team's sponsorship purposes. In a season dominated by Johann Zarco, Rins achieved two wins and ten podiums, ultimately finishing second in the final standings and winning the rookie of the year.

Rins stayed with the Paginas Amarillas HP 40 team for 2016. The season began well for Rins, achieving wins in Austin and Le Mans and seven podiums. However, a late season slump coupled with a surge in performance from Thomas Lüthi resulted in Rins finishing the season in third place.

=== MotoGP World Championship (2017–2026) ===
==== Team Suzuki Ecstar (2017–2022) ====
Rins moved up to the MotoGP class for the 2017 season with Team Suzuki Ecstar alongside his new teammate, Andrea Iannone, and changed his number back from 40 to 42. The first half of his season was hampered when he broke his wrist during practice at Texas in April, and didn't return to the bike until two months later at Assen. However, his fortunes took an upturn with a season-best fifth place in the wet in Japan, bettered with a fourth-place finish at the final round in Valencia.

An improved Suzuki machine coupled with a lack of injuries allowed Rins to be a consistent podium contender in 2018. Despite a disappointing start to the season with five retirements in nine races, Rins amassed five podiums (including second place in both of the final two rounds) and a total of 169 points, finishing the season in fifth place of the rider's championship and 36 points ahead of his teammate Iannone.

On 17 May 2018, ahead of the French GP, Rins was confirmed to have signed a two-year extension with Suzuki, guaranteeing his factory rider position with the Hamamatsu manufacturer through 2020.

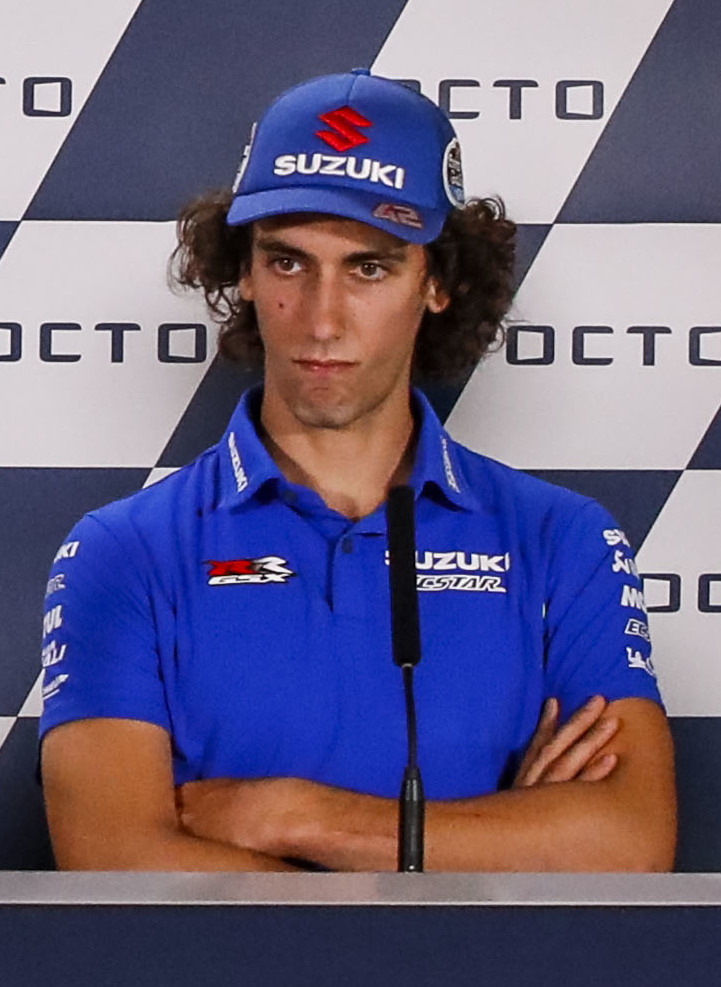
Rins in 2019

For the 2019 season, Rins was paired with MotoGP rookie and 2017 Moto3 champion Joan Mir. After finishing just outside of the podium in both the Qatar and Argentine round, Rins won the 2019 Grand Prix of the Americas whilst dueling with Valentino Rossi after the retirement of Marc Márquez. It was his first win in the MotoGP class, and a second victory followed at Silverstone, as Rins won by only 0.013 seconds following an intense battle with Marc Márquez. These strong performances meant Rins finished the season with 205 points and fourth in the riders' championship.

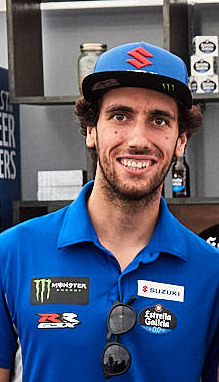
Rins in 2022

==== LCR Honda Castrol (2023) ====
On 19 July 2022, Rins signed a two-year deal with LCR Honda starting in 2023.

Rins won the Grand Prix of the Americas, becoming the first rider other than Marc Márquez to win for Honda since Cal Crutchlow in the 2018 Argentine Grand Prix. However, Rins suffered a heavy crash at the Italian Grand Prix that kept him out for most of the 2023 season.

==== Monster Energy Yamaha MotoGP (2024–2026) ====
On August 3, 2023, Rins announced he would be leaving Honda and the LCR Team to join the Monster Energy Yamaha MotoGP for the 2024 MotoGP season, replacing the seat made vacant by Franco Morbidelli.

Rins would be retained by Yamaha for the 2025 and 2026 season.

Rins is set to depart Yamaha at the end of the 2026 season.

=== Retirement from motorcycle racing ===
Ahead of the San Marino Grand Prix, Rins announced his retirement from MotoGP and two-wheeled racing despite offers to join the Superbike World Championship, instead focusing on a "really interesting project" that is set to be revealed at a later date.

== Career statistics ==
=== CEV Buckler 125GP Championship ===
==== Races by year ====
(key)

Year	1	2	3	4	5	6	7	Pos	Pts
2010	CAT; 1	ALB1; 6	JER1; 2	ARA; 3	ALB2; 2	VAL; 3	JER2; 4	3rd	120
2011	JER1; 1	ARA; 2	CAT; 1	ALB1; 3	ALB2; 16	VAL; 3	JER2; 16	1st	102

=== Grand Prix motorcycle racing ===
==== By season ====
Season	Class	Motorcycle	Team	Race	Win	Podium	Pole	FLap	Pts	Plcd
2012	Moto3	Suter Honda	Estrella Galicia 0,0	17	0	1	1	1	141	5th
2013	Moto3	KTM	Estrella Galicia 0,0	17	6	14	8	1	311	**2nd**
2014	Moto3	Honda	Estrella Galicia 0,0	18	2	8	4	3	237	**3rd**
2015	Moto2	Kalex	Paginas Amarillas HP 40	17	2	10	3	4	234	**2nd**
2016	Moto2	Kalex	Paginas Amarillas HP 40	18	2	7	1	3	214	**3rd**
2017	MotoGP	Suzuki	Team Suzuki Ecstar	12	0	0	0	0	59	16th
2018	MotoGP	Suzuki	Team Suzuki Ecstar	18	0	5	0	1	169	5th
2019	MotoGP	Suzuki	Team Suzuki Ecstar	19	2	3	0	1	205	4th
2020	MotoGP	Suzuki	Team Suzuki Ecstar	13	1	4	0	2	139	**3rd**
2021	MotoGP	Suzuki	Team Suzuki Ecstar	17	0	1	0	1	99	13th
2022	MotoGP	Suzuki	Team Suzuki Ecstar	19	2	4	0	1	173	7th
2023	MotoGP	Honda	LCR Honda Castrol	7	1	1	0	1	54	19th
2024	MotoGP	Yamaha	Monster Energy Yamaha MotoGP Team	17	0	0	0	0	31	18th
2025	MotoGP	Yamaha	Monster Energy Yamaha MotoGP	22	0	0	0	0	68	19th
2026	MotoGP	Yamaha	Monster Energy Yamaha MotoGP	18	0	0	0	0	29*	20th*
Total				**251**	**18**	**58**	**17**	**19**	**2163**	

==== By class ====
Class	Seasons	1st GP	1st pod	1st win	Race	Win	Podiums	Pole	FLap	Pts	WChmp
Moto3	2012–2014	2012 Qatar	2012 France	2013 Americas	52	8	23	13	5	689	0
Moto2	2015–2016	2015 Qatar	2015 Americas	2015 Indianapolis	35	4	17	4	7	448	0
MotoGP	2017–present	2017 Qatar	2018 Argentina	2019 Americas	163	6	18	0	7	1026	0
Total	2012–present				**251**	**18**	**58**	**17**	**19**	**2163**	**0**

==== Races by year ====
(key) (Races in bold indicate pole position, races in italics indicate fastest lap)

Year	Class	Bike	1	2	3	4	5	6	7	8	9	10	11	12	13	14	15	16	17	18	19	20	21	22	Pos	Pts
2012	Moto3	Suter Honda	QAT; 10	**SPA**; 4	POR; 7	FRA; 3	CAT; Ret	GBR; Ret	NED; 6	GER; 20	ITA; 7	INP; 7	CZE; 5	RSM; 4	ARA; 6	JPN; 4	MAL; 7	AUS; 4	VAL; 16						5th	141
2013	Moto3	KTM	QAT; 3	**AME**; 1	**SPA**; Ret	FRA; 2	ITA; 2	CAT; 2	NED; 3	**GER**; 1	**INP**; 1	**CZE**; 4	GBR; 2	RSM; 1	**ARA**; 1	MAL; 2	AUS; 1	**JPN**; 24	**VAL**; 3						2nd	311
2014	Moto3	Honda	**QAT**; 5	AME; 4	ARG; 5	SPA; 3	FRA; 2	**ITA**; 3	CAT; Ret	NED; 2	GER; Ret	INP; 5	CZE; 9	**GBR**; 1	RSM; 1	**ARA**; 4	JPN; 10	AUS; 3	MAL; 3	VAL; 5					3rd	237
2015	Moto2	Kalex	QAT; 4	AME; 3	ARG; 2	SPA; 18	**FRA**; 17	ITA; 11	CAT; 2	NED; 4	GER; 3	**INP**; 1	CZE; 3	GBR; 2	RSM; DSQ	ARA; 2	JPN; 11	**AUS**; 1	MAL; Ret	VAL; 2					2nd	234
2016	Moto2	Kalex	QAT; 8	ARG; 4	**AME**; 1	SPA; 3	FRA; 1	ITA; 7	CAT; 2	NED; 6	GER; Ret	AUT; 3	CZE; 2	GBR; 7	RSM; 2	ARA; 6	JPN; 20	AUS; Ret	MAL; 14	VAL; 5					3rd	214
2017	MotoGP	Suzuki	QAT; 9	ARG; Ret	AME; DNS	SPA	FRA	ITA	CAT	NED; 17	GER; 21	CZE; 11	AUT; 16	GBR; 9	RSM; 8	ARA; 17	JPN; 5	AUS; 8	MAL; DSQ	VAL; 4					16th	59
2018	MotoGP	Suzuki	QAT; Ret	ARG; 3	AME; Ret	SPA; Ret	FRA; 10	ITA; 5	CAT; Ret	NED; 2	GER; Ret	CZE; 11	AUT; 8	GBR; C	RSM; 4	ARA; 4	THA; 6	JPN; 3	AUS; 5	MAL; 2	VAL; 2				5th	169
2019	MotoGP	Suzuki	QAT; 4	ARG; 5	AME; 1	SPA; 2	FRA; 10	ITA; 4	CAT; 4	NED; Ret	GER; Ret	CZE; 4	AUT; 6	GBR; 1	RSM; Ret	ARA; 9	THA; 5	JPN; 7	AUS; 9	MAL; 5	VAL; 5				4th	205
2020	MotoGP	Suzuki	SPA; DNS	ANC; 10	CZE; 4	AUT; Ret	STY; 6	RSM; 5	EMI; 12	CAT; 3	FRA; NC	ARA; 1	TER; 2	EUR; 2	VAL; 4	POR; 15									3rd	139
2021	MotoGP	Suzuki	QAT; 6	DOH; 4	POR; Ret	SPA; 20	FRA; Ret	ITA; Ret	CAT	GER; 11	NED; 11	STY; 7	AUT; 14	GBR; 2	ARA; 12	RSM; Ret	AME; 4	EMI; 6	ALR; 8	VAL; Ret					13th	99
2022	MotoGP	Suzuki	QAT; 7	INA; 5	ARG; 3	AME; 2	POR; 4	SPA; 19	FRA; Ret	ITA; Ret	CAT; Ret	GER; DNS	NED; 10	GBR; 7	AUT; 8	RSM; 7	ARA; 9	JPN; Ret	THA; 12	AUS; 1	MAL; 5	VAL; 1			7th	173
2023	MotoGP	Honda	POR; 10	ARG; 9	AME; 1^{2}	SPA; Ret	FRA; Ret	ITA; DNS	GER	NED	GBR	AUT	CAT	RSM	IND	JPN; WD	INA; 9	AUS; DNS	THA	MAL	QAT	VAL; Ret			19th	54
2024	MotoGP	Yamaha	QAT; 16	POR; 13	AME; Ret	SPA; 13	FRA; 15	CAT; 20	ITA; 15	NED; Ret	GER	GBR; DNS	AUT; 16	ARA; 9	RSM; 19	EMI; DNS	INA; 11	JPN; 16	AUS; 13	THA; Ret	MAL; 8	SLD; 21			18th	31
2025	MotoGP	Yamaha	THA; 17	ARG; 11	AME; 11	QAT; 12	SPA; 13	FRA; 12^{8}	GBR; 13	ARA; 11	ITA; 15	NED; 13	GER; 10	CZE; 15	AUT; 16	HUN; 13	CAT; Ret	RSM; Ret	JPN; 18	INA; 10	AUS; 7	MAL; 13	POR; 13	VAL; 14	19th	68
2026	MotoGP	Yamaha	THA; 15	BRA; 14	USA; 18	SPA; 16	FRA; 12	CAT; 14	ITA; Ret	HUN; 13	CZE; Ret	NED; 9	GER; 14	GBR; Ret	ARA; 14	RSM; Ret	AUT; 19	JPN; 16	INA; 15	AUS; C	MAL; 12	QAT; DNA	POR	VAL	20th*	29*

* Season still in progress.

Sporting positions
Preceded by Maverick Viñales	CEV Buckler 125GP; Champion; 2011	Succeeded by Álex Márquez
