= 2021 Emilia Romagna motorcycle Grand Prix =

(Emilia-Romagna) 2021 Emilia Romagna Grand Prix
Race details
- Race 16 of 18 races in the 2021 Grand Prix motorcycle racing season
- Date: 24 October 2021
- Official name: Gran Premio Nolan del Made in Italy e dell'Emilia-Romagna
- Location: Misano World Circuit Marco Simoncelli; Misano Adriatico, Province of Rimini, Italy
- Course: Permanent racing facility; 4.226 km (2.626 mi)

MotoGP
Pole position
Rider	(Italy) Francesco Bagnaia	Ducati
Time	1:33.045	
Fastest lap
Rider	(Italy) Francesco Bagnaia	Ducati
Time	1:32.171 on lap 16	
Podium
First	(Spain) Marc Márquez	Honda
Second	(Spain) Pol Espargaró	Honda
Third	(Italy) Enea Bastianini	Ducati

Moto2
Pole position
Rider	(United Kingdom) Sam Lowes	Kalex
Time	1:36.510	
Fastest lap
Rider	(Spain) Augusto Fernández	Kalex
Time	1:36.182 on lap 20	
Podium
First	(United Kingdom) Sam Lowes	Kalex
Second	(Spain) Augusto Fernández	Kalex
Third	(Spain) Arón Canet	Boscoscuro

Moto3
Pole position
Rider	(Italy) Niccolò Antonelli	KTM
Time	1:48.563	
Fastest lap
Rider	(Italy) Andrea Migno	Honda
Time	1:42.284 on lap 8	
Podium
First	(Italy) Dennis Foggia	Honda
Second	(Spain) Jaume Masià	KTM
Third	(Spain) Pedro Acosta	KTM

The 2021 Emilia Romagna motorcycle Grand Prix (officially known as the Gran Premio Nolan del Made in Italy e dell'Emilia-Romagna) was the sixteenth round of the 2021 Grand Prix motorcycle racing season. It was held at the Misano World Circuit Marco Simoncelli in Misano Adriatico on 24 October 2021.

The VR46 team unveiled a special livery that was used by Marco Bezzecchi and Celestino Vietti in the Moto2 class, as well as Luca Marini in the MotoGP premier class. Sky Racing Team VR46, which usually wears black and blue livery, has now completely changed to yellow with Grazie Vale writing on the side of the bike. This was done as a form of respect for Valentino Rossi who decided to retire at the end of the 2021 season.

In the MotoGP class, Fabio Quartararo became the first French rider to win the MotoGP World Championship after main rival Francesco Bagnaia crashed out of the lead with five laps to go, clinching the championship with two rounds to spare after having an unassailable 62-points-lead over Bagnaia. Marc Márquez won the race, his last win for Repsol Honda and his latest win until Aragon GP in 2024.

In the Moto3 class, Red Bull KTM Ajo won their first Teams' Championship and third across all classes. It was their second championship for 2021 after having won the Moto2 Teams' Championship during the Aragon race.

== Qualifying ==
=== MotoGP ===
Fastest session lap

Pos.	No.	Biker	Constructor	Qualifying times		Final grid	Row
Pos.	No.	Biker	Constructor	Q1	Q2	Final grid	Row
1	63	(Italy) Francesco Bagnaia	Ducati	1:33.393	1:33.045	1	1
2	43	(Australia) Jack Miller	Ducati	Qualified in Q2	1:33.070	2	1
3	10	(Italy) Luca Marini	Ducati	Qualified in Q2	1:33.130	3	1
4	44	(Spain) Pol Espargaró	Honda	Qualified in Q2	1:33.313	4	2
5	88	(Portugal) Miguel Oliveira	KTM	Qualified in Q2	1:33.439	5	2
6	21	(Italy) Franco Morbidelli	Yamaha	Qualified in Q2	1:33.526	6	2
7	93	(Spain) Marc Márquez	Honda	Qualified in Q2	1:33.850	7	3
8	27	(Spain) Iker Lecuona	KTM	1:34.099	1:33.893	8	3
9	9	(Italy) Danilo Petrucci	KTM	Qualified in Q2	1:34.140	9	3
10	5	(France) Johann Zarco	Ducati	Qualified in Q2	1:34.687	10	4
11	41	(Spain) Aleix Espargaró	Aprilia	Qualified in Q2	1:34.963	11	4
12	89	(Spain) Jorge Martín	Ducati	Qualified in Q2	2:24.631	12	4
13	42	(Spain) Álex Rins	Suzuki	1:34.418	N/A	13	5
14	73	(Spain) Álex Márquez	Honda	1:34.454	N/A	14	5
15	20	(France) Fabio Quartararo	Yamaha	1:34.476	N/A	15	5
16	23	(Italy) Enea Bastianini	Ducati	1:35.236	N/A	16	6
17	30	(Japan) Takaaki Nakagami	Honda	1:35.641	N/A	17	6
18	36	(Spain) Joan Mir	Suzuki	1:35.683	N/A	18	6
19	12	(Spain) Maverick Viñales	Aprilia	1:35.835	N/A	19	7
20	33	(South Africa) Brad Binder	KTM	1:36.478	N/A	20	7
21	4	(Italy) Andrea Dovizioso	Yamaha	1:36.639	N/A	21	7
22	51	(Italy) Michele Pirro	Ducati	1:37.880	N/A	22	8
23	46	(Italy) Valentino Rossi	Yamaha	1:38.261	N/A	23	8
DNP	32	(Italy) Lorenzo Savadori	Aprilia	N/A	N/A	N/A	N/A
OFFICIAL MOTOGP QUALIFYING RESULTS

- Lorenzo Savadori suffered a broken collarbone in a crash during practice and was declared unfit to compete.

== Race ==
=== MotoGP ===
Pos.	No.	Rider	Team	Manufacturer	Laps	Time/Retired	Grid	Points
1	93	(Spain) Marc Márquez	Repsol Honda Team	Honda	27	41:52.830	7	25
2	44	(Spain) Pol Espargaró	Repsol Honda Team	Honda	27	+4.859	4	20
3	23	(Italy) Enea Bastianini	Avintia Esponsorama	Ducati	27	+12.013	16	16
4	20	(France) Fabio Quartararo	Monster Energy Yamaha MotoGP	Yamaha	27	+12.775	15	13
5	5	(France) Johann Zarco	Pramac Racing	Ducati	27	+16.458	10	11
6	42	(Spain) Álex Rins	Team Suzuki Ecstar	Suzuki	27	+17.669	13	10
7	41	(Spain) Aleix Espargaró	Aprilia Racing Team Gresini	Aprilia	27	+18.468	11	9
8	12	(Spain) Maverick Viñales	Aprilia Racing Team Gresini	Aprilia	27	+18.607	19	8
9	10	(Italy) Luca Marini	Sky VR46 Avintia	Ducati	27	+25.417	3	7
10	46	(Italy) Valentino Rossi	Petronas Yamaha SRT	Yamaha	27	+27.735	23	6
11	33	(South Africa) Brad Binder	Red Bull KTM Factory Racing	KTM	27	+27.879	20	5
12	51	(Italy) Michele Pirro	Ducati Lenovo Team	Ducati	27	+28.137	22	4
13	4	(Italy) Andrea Dovizioso	Petronas Yamaha SRT	Yamaha	27	+41.413	21	3
14	21	(Italy) Franco Morbidelli	Monster Energy Yamaha MotoGP	Yamaha	27	+42.830	6	2
15	30	(Japan) Takaaki Nakagami	LCR Honda Idemitsu	Honda	27	+1:22.462	17	1
Ret	63	(Italy) Francesco Bagnaia	Ducati Lenovo Team	Ducati	22	Accident	1	
Ret	88	(Portugal) Miguel Oliveira	Red Bull KTM Factory Racing	KTM	22	Accident	5	
Ret	89	(Spain) Jorge Martín	Pramac Racing	Ducati	12	Accident	12	
Ret	27	(Spain) Iker Lecuona	Tech3 KTM Factory Racing	KTM	10	Accident	8	
Ret	73	(Spain) Álex Márquez	LCR Honda Castrol	Honda	9	Electronics	14	
Ret	43	(Australia) Jack Miller	Ducati Lenovo Team	Ducati	3	Accident	2	
Ret	9	(Italy) Danilo Petrucci	Tech3 KTM Factory Racing	KTM	1	Accident	9	
Ret	36	(Spain) Joan Mir	Team Suzuki Ecstar	Suzuki	1	Accident	18	
DNS	32	(Italy) Lorenzo Savadori	Aprilia Racing Team Gresini	Aprilia		Did not start		
Fastest lap: (Italy) Francesco Bagnaia (Ducati) – 1:32.171 (lap 16)
Sources:

- Lorenzo Savadori suffered a broken collarbone in a crash during practice and was declared unfit to compete.

=== Moto2 ===
Pos.	No.	Rider	Manufacturer	Laps	Time/Retired	Grid	Points
1	22	(United Kingdom) Sam Lowes	Kalex	25	40:25.180	1	25
2	37	(Spain) Augusto Fernández	Kalex	25	+1.233	3	20
3	44	(Spain) Arón Canet	Boscoscuro	25	+1.400	4	16
4	13	(Italy) Celestino Vietti	Kalex	25	+2.554	5	13
5	9	(Spain) Jorge Navarro	Boscoscuro	25	+4.243	2	11
6	62	(Italy) Stefano Manzi	Kalex	25	+5.198	7	10
7	87	(Australia) Remy Gardner	Kalex	25	+14.261	14	9
8	21	(Italy) Fabio Di Giannantonio	Kalex	25	+15.868	20	8
9	79	(Japan) Ai Ogura	Kalex	25	+18.905	18	7
10	42	(Spain) Marcos Ramírez	Kalex	25	+19.069	6	6
11	75	(Spain) Albert Arenas	Boscoscuro	25	+19.675	8	5
12	64	(Netherlands) Bo Bendsneyder	Kalex	25	+24.309	12	4
13	96	(United Kingdom) Jake Dixon	Kalex	25	+26.777	17	3
14	12	(Switzerland) Thomas Lüthi	Kalex	25	+34.699	11	2
15	23	(Germany) Marcel Schrötter	Kalex	25	+36.240	21	1
16	54	(Spain) Fermín Aldeguer	Boscoscuro	25	+37.590	13	
17	70	(Belgium) Barry Baltus	NTS	25	+37.899	23	
18	11	(Italy) Nicolò Bulega	Kalex	25	+37.966	29	
19	24	(Italy) Simone Corsi	MV Agusta	25	+50.787	26	
20	7	(Italy) Lorenzo Baldassarri	MV Agusta	25	+1:02.974	22	
Ret	72	(Italy) Marco Bezzecchi	Kalex	22	Accident	24	
Ret	97	(Spain) Xavi Vierge	Kalex	16	Accident	16	
Ret	14	(Italy) Tony Arbolino	Kalex	15	Accident	27	
Ret	27	(Italy) Mattia Casadei	Kalex	15	Handling	28	
Ret	25	(Spain) Raúl Fernández	Kalex	14	Accident	9	
Ret	40	(Spain) Héctor Garzó	Kalex	12	Accident	15	
Ret	10	(Italy) Tommaso Marcon	NTS	9	Rider In Pain	25	
Ret	6	(United States) Cameron Beaubier	Kalex	8	Accident	19	
Ret	35	(Thailand) Somkiat Chantra	Kalex	6	Accident	10	
DNS	16	(United States) Joe Roberts	Kalex		Did not start		
OFFICIAL MOTO2 RACE REPORT

- Joe Roberts suffered a broken collarbone in a crash during practice and withdrew from the event.

=== Moto3 ===
Pos.	No.	Rider	Manufacturer	Laps	Time/Retired	Grid	Points
1	7	(Italy) Dennis Foggia	Honda	23	39:33.170	14	25
2	5	(Spain) Jaume Masià	KTM	23	+0.292	6	20
3	37	(Spain) Pedro Acosta	KTM	23	+4.686	5	16
4	40	(South Africa) Darryn Binder	Honda	23	+4.797	16	13
5	82	(Italy) Stefano Nepa	KTM	23	+4.853	8	11
6	23	(Italy) Niccolò Antonelli	KTM	23	+5.052	1	10
7	55	(Italy) Romano Fenati	Husqvarna	23	+5.335	19	9
8	71	(Japan) Ayumu Sasaki	KTM	23	+6.642	10	8
9	43	(Spain) Xavier Artigas	Honda	23	+6.736	9	7
10	12	(Czech Republic) Filip Salač	KTM	23	+6.800	2	6
11	6	(Japan) Ryusei Yamanaka	KTM	23	+10.535	20	5
12	28	(Spain) Izan Guevara	Gas Gas	23	+17.811	4	4
13	31	(Spain) Adrián Fernández	Husqvarna	23	+18.050	11	3
14	52	(Spain) Jeremy Alcoba	Honda	23	+18.260	26	2
15	19	(Indonesia) Andi Farid Izdihar	Honda	23	+19.264	15	1
16	67	(Italy) Alberto Surra	Honda	23	+20.217	7	
17	27	(Japan) Kaito Toba	KTM	23	+24.704	27	
18	73	(Austria) Maximilian Kofler	KTM	23	+24.902	28	
19	20	(France) Lorenzo Fellon	Honda	23	+24.976	17	
20	96	(Spain) Daniel Holgado	KTM	23	+25.323	18	
21	64	(Indonesia) Mario Aji	Honda	23	+46.495	23	
22	80	(Colombia) David Alonso	Gas Gas	23	+1:25.207	25	
Ret	92	(Japan) Yuki Kunii	Honda	20	Accident	13	
Ret	16	(Italy) Andrea Migno	Honda	12	Accident	22	
Ret	99	(Spain) Carlos Tatay	KTM	11	Ankle Pain	21	
Ret	24	(Japan) Tatsuki Suzuki	Honda	10	Accident	24	
Ret	17	(United Kingdom) John McPhee	Honda	8	Accident	12	
Ret	54	(Italy) Riccardo Rossi	KTM	5	Accident	3	
OFFICIAL MOTO3 RACE REPORT

== Championship standings after the race ==
Below are the standings for the top five riders, constructors, and teams after the round.

=== MotoGP ===
Riders' Championship standings

	Pos.	Rider	Points
	1	(France) Fabio Quartararo	267
	2	(Italy) Francesco Bagnaia	202
	3	(Spain) Joan Mir	175
1	4	(France) Johann Zarco	152
1	5	(Australia) Jack Miller	149

Constructors' Championship standings

	Pos.	Constructor	Points
	1	(Italy) Ducati	307
	2	(Japan) Yamaha	295
	3	(Japan) Suzuki	207
1	4	(Japan) Honda	198
1	5	(Austria) KTM	190

Teams' Championship standings

	Pos.	Team	Points
1	1	(Japan) Monster Energy Yamaha MotoGP	364
1	2	(Italy) Ducati Lenovo Team	351
	3	(Japan) Team Suzuki Ecstar	266
2	4	(Japan) Repsol Honda Team	239
1	5	(Italy) Pramac Racing	238

=== Moto2 ===
Riders' Championship standings

Pos.	Rider	Points
1	(Australia) Remy Gardner	280
2	(Spain) Raúl Fernández	262
3	(Italy) Marco Bezzecchi	206
4	(United Kingdom) Sam Lowes	165
5	(Spain) Augusto Fernández	151

Constructors' Championship standings

Pos.	Constructor	Points
1	(Germany) Kalex	400
2	(Italy) Boscoscuro	175
3	(Italy) MV Agusta	19
4	(Japan) NTS	10

Teams' Championship standings

	Pos.	Team	Points
	1	(Finland) Red Bull KTM Ajo	542
	2	(Belgium) Elf Marc VDS Racing Team	316
	3	(Italy) Sky Racing Team VR46	272
1	4	(Spain) Aspar Team Moto2	168
1	5	(Japan) Idemitsu Honda Team Asia	157

=== Moto3 ===
Riders' Championship standings

	Pos.	Rider	Points
	1	(Spain) Pedro Acosta	234
	2	(Italy) Dennis Foggia	213
	3	(Spain) Sergio García	168
1	4	(Spain) Jaume Masiá	155
1	5	(Italy) Romano Fenati	147

Constructors' Championship standings

Pos.	Constructor	Points
1	(Austria) KTM	328
2	(Japan) Honda	315
3	(Spain) Gas Gas	235
4	(Sweden) Husqvarna	153

Teams' Championship standings

Pos.	Team	Points
1	(Finland) Red Bull KTM Ajo	389
2	(Spain) Gaviota GasGas Aspar Team	273
3	(Luxembourg) Leopard Racing	252
4	(Malaysia) Petronas Sprinta Racing	211
5	(France) Red Bull KTM Tech3	188

Previous race: 2021 Grand Prix of the Americas	FIM Grand Prix World Championship; 2021 season	Next race: 2021 Algarve Grand Prix
Previous race: 2020 Emilia Romagna Grand Prix	Emilia Romagna motorcycle Grand Prix	Next race: 2024 Emilia Romagna Grand Prix
