= Francesco Bagnaia =

Italian motorcycle racer (born 1997)

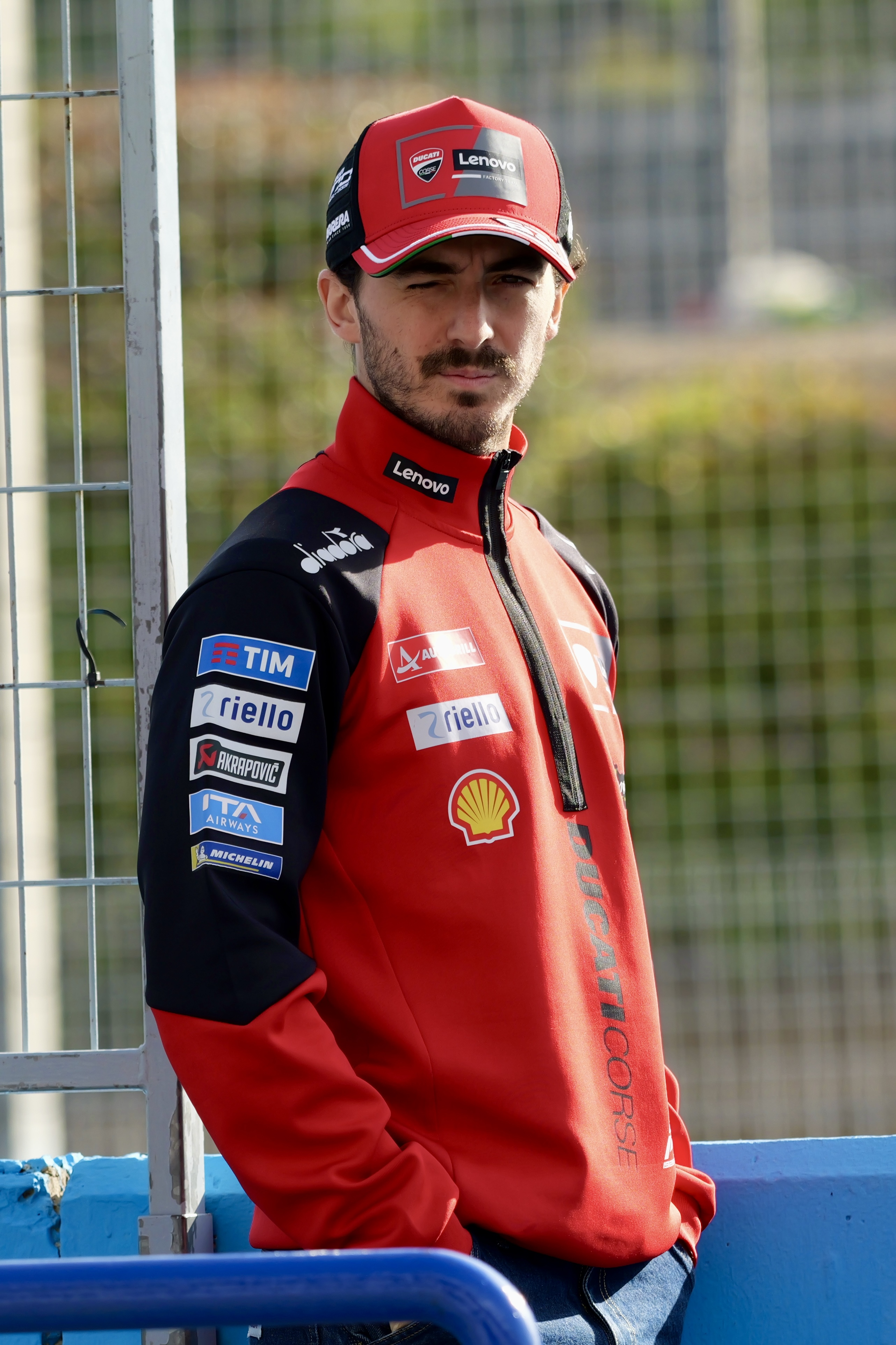
- Bagnaia at the 2026 Spanish Grand Prix
- Nationality: Italian
- Born: 14 January 1997 (age 29); Turin, Italy
- Current team: Ducati Lenovo Team
- Bike number: 63
Motorcycle racing career statistics
MotoGP World Championship
| Active years | 2019– |
| Manufacturers | Ducati (2019–2026) |
| Championships | 2 (2022, 2023) |
| 2025 championship position | 5th (288 pts) |
Starts / Wins / Podiums / Poles / F. laps / Points; 146 / 31 / 63 / 28 / 22 / 2044
Moto2 World Championship
| Active years | 2017–2018 |
| Manufacturers | Kalex |
| Championships | 1 (2018) |
| 2018 championship position | 1st (306 pts) |
Starts / Wins / Podiums / Poles / F. laps / Points; 36 / 8 / 16 / 6 / 3 / 480
Moto3 World Championship
| Active years | 2013–2016 |
| Manufacturers | FTR Honda (2013); KTM (2014); Mahindra (2015–2016) |
| Championships | 0 |
| 2016 championship position | 4th (145 pts) |
Starts / Wins / Podiums / Poles / F. laps / Points; 69 / 2 / 7 / 1 / 2 / 271

Francesco "Pecco" Bagnaia (/bəˈnjaɪə/ bə-NY-EYE-ə; born 14 January 1997) is an Italian Grand Prix motorcycle road racer who races for the Ducati Lenovo Team in MotoGP. He is the 2022 and 2023 MotoGP World Riders' Champion.

Bagnaia was the 2018 Moto2 World Riders' Champion. He is the first and only rider from Valentino Rossi's VR46 Riders Academy to win a world title in the premier class. His 2022 title was also the first Ducati rider World Championship in 15 years and the first for an Italian rider since Rossi in 2009.

== Career ==
=== Early career ===
Bagnaia was born in Turin, Italy, and rode Minimoto bikes from a young age, winning the European MiniGP championship in 2009. He made his pre-GP 125 Mediterranean championship debut with Monlau Competición team in 2010 and finished the season as runner-up. In 2011, he took part in the Spanish Championships in the 125cc category, winning a race, and finishing third in the final standings. In the 2012 CEV Moto3 season, he rode a Honda NSF250R and once again finished third in the championship behind Álex Márquez and Luca Amato, with a race win and two second places in seven races. Bagnaia joined the VR46 Riders Academy, and remains a member.

=== Moto3 World Championship ===
Bagnaia made his Grand Prix debut in the 2013 Moto3 World Championship, with Team Italia FMI riding a Honda alongside his teammate Romano Fenati. The season was a disappointing year for Bagnaia as he did not manage to get a single point in the 17 races he participated in. His best race was a 16th-place finish at Sepang.

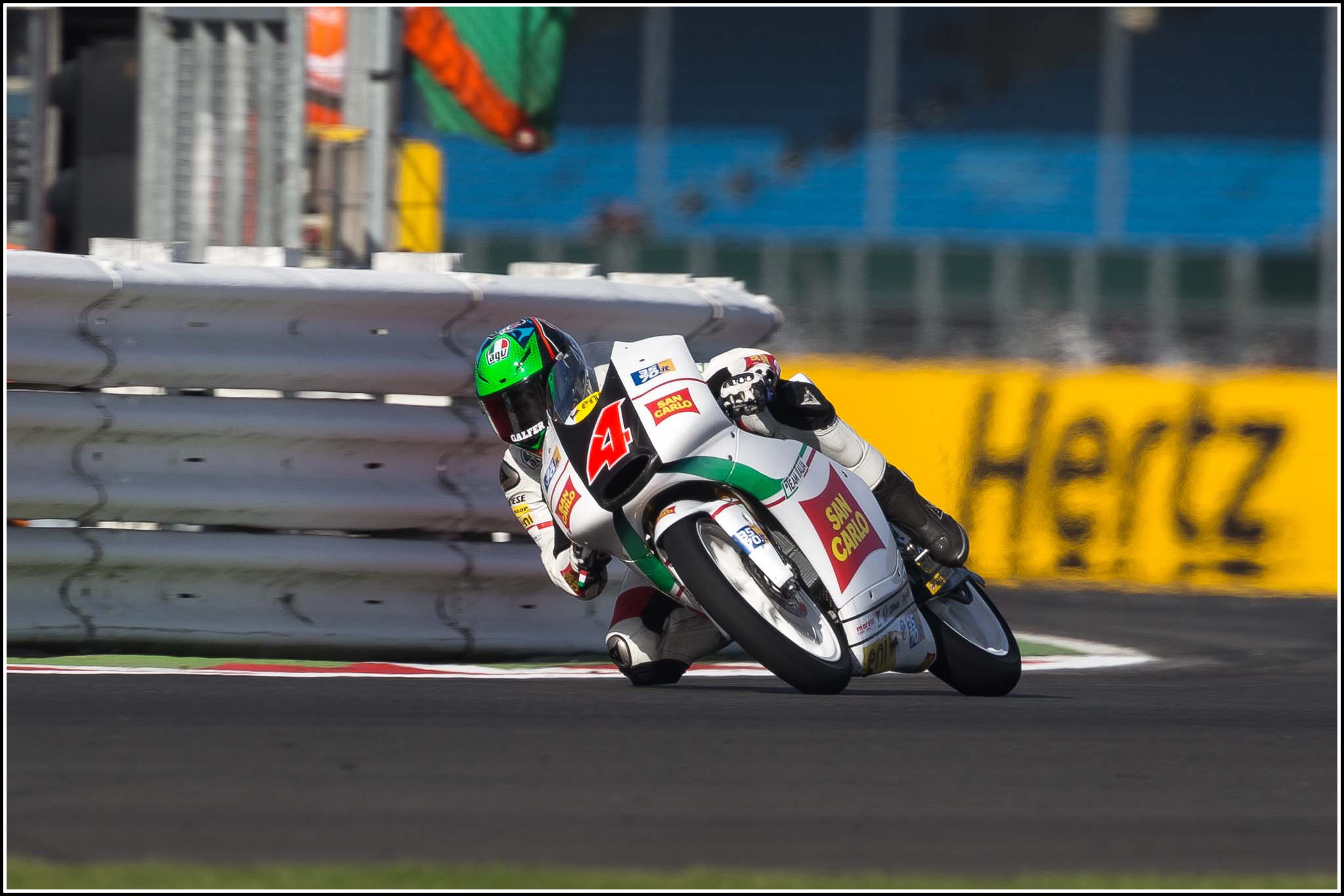
Bagnaia at the 2013 British Grand Prix

In 2014, Bagnaia switched teams to join the newly formed Sky Racing Team by VR46, riding a KTM with Romano Fenati again. After failing to score points in his rookie season, Bagnaia made clear improvements, finishing in the top-ten five times during the first seven races, with a fourth-place finish at Le Mans as his best result, where he also set the fastest lap of the race. Bagnaia missed the races at Assen and Sachsenring due to injury. After scoring 42 points in the first seven races of the campaign, Bagnaia slumped badly during the second part of the season, only finishing in the points twice of the last nine races, clearly affected by his injury. He finished the season in 16th position with 50 points.

In 2015, Bagnaia made another team and bike change, this time joining Aspar Team on a Mahindra, with new teammates being Juanfran Guevara and Jorge Martín. In the fifth race of the season in France, Bagnaia got his first podium at Le Mans, finishing the race in 3rd place behind Romano Fenati and Enea Bastianini. In the next race at Mugello, Bagnaia finished fourth, missing the podium by 0.003 seconds. He was on his way to another podium finish at Silverstone but crashed with two laps remaining, fighting with Niccolò Antonelli for the third place. Despite improving his championship position by two places, and gaining 26 more points than the previous year on a new bike for the third straight season, this time a Mahindra, it was still an up and down year for him. Bagnaia only finished in the top ten during five races. He also missed points in seven races, unclassified in five of those. He finished the year 14th place in the championship standings, with 76 points.

In 2016, Bagnaia started the season with a podium finish at Losail and another podium finish at Jerez, finishing third on both occasions. At his home race in Italy, Bagnaia again secured third position, beating Niccolò Antonelli by 0.006 seconds. Followed by a crash at Barcelona, Bagnaia secured his first Grand Prix win at the historic Assen circuit, in what was his 59th Moto3 race, and the first win for Mahindra, too. He had four podiums in the first eight races of the season, and found himself fighting for the title. After two average races and a crash at Brno, Bagnaia got his first pole position in the rain-affected Silverstone and finished second behind Brad Binder in the race. Bagnaia won his second race of the season at Sepang, winning the race comfortably with a big gap after Brad Binder, Joan Mir and Lorenzo Dalla Porta all crashed out in the same corner during the beginning of the race, which was filled with multiple crashes. He finished the season with 145 points to place fourth in the Moto3 Championship with a total of two wins and six podiums. Bagnaia would have had an opportunity to finish second in the World Championship behind Brad Binder, but was taken out in both Phillip Island and Valencia by Gabriel Rodrigo. Rodrigo pushed out Fabio Di Giannantonio in Australia who went down and collected Bagnaia with him in that crash. In Valencia, Rodrigo made a highside crash on the first lap approaching the last corner which Bagnaia was unable to avoid.

=== Moto2 World Championship ===
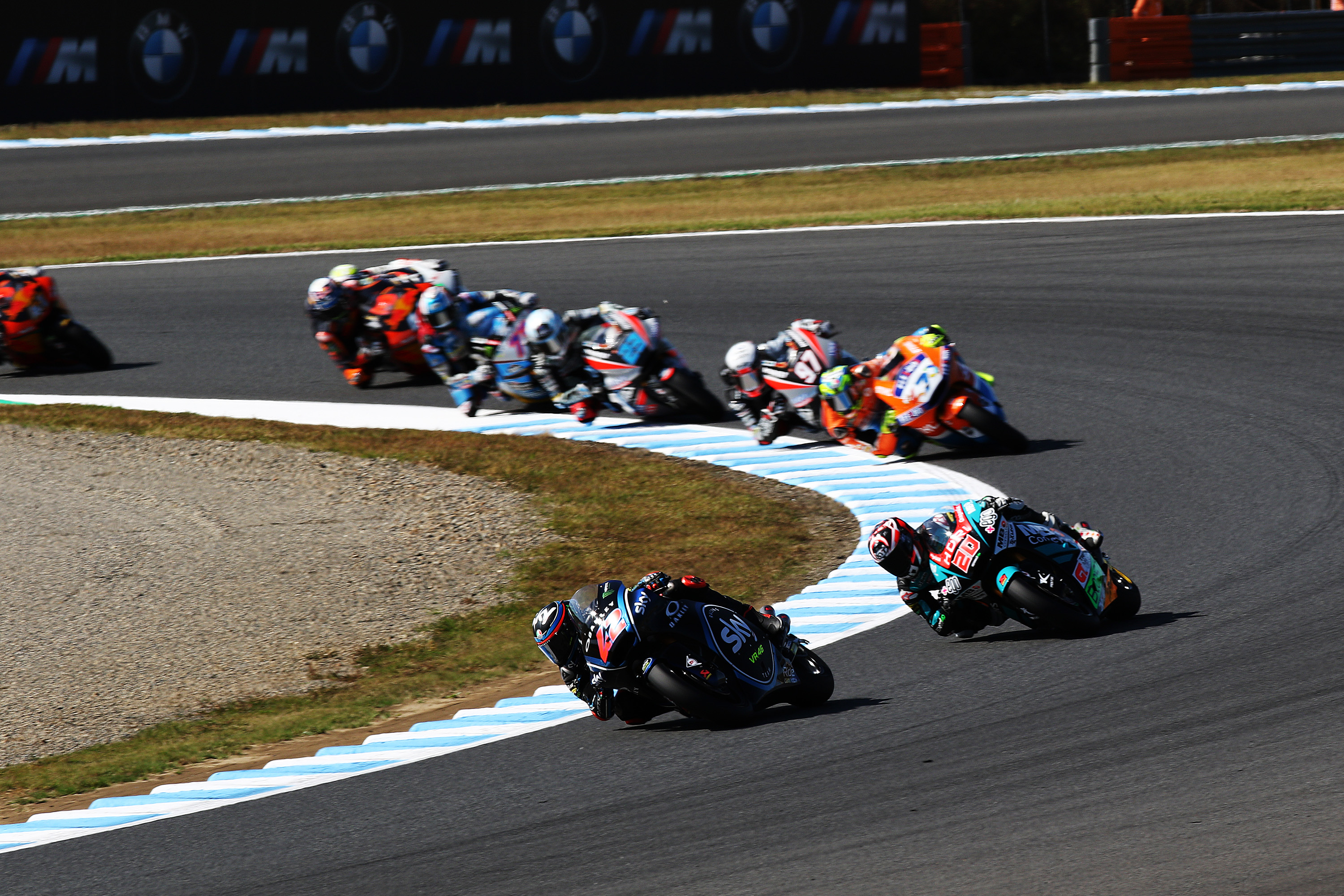
Bagnaia leading the race at the 2018 Japanese Grand Prix

After four seasons in the Moto3 category, Bagnaia moved up to Moto2 racing for Sky Racing Team VR46, where he last rode in 2014. For the 2017 Moto2 World Championship, he would have Stefano Manzi as his teammate. In just his fourth ever Moto2 race at Jerez, Bagnaia finished second. He finished second in the next race as well at Le Mans after having qualified in second place, missing pole position to Thomas Lüthi by just 0.026 seconds. Bagnaia took a third podium at Sachsenring, finishing third behind Franco Morbidelli and Miguel Oliveira. At Misano Bagnaia originally finished the race fourth behind Dominique Aegerter, Thomas Lüthi and Hafizh Syahrin; however, Aegerter was later disqualified, promoting him to third of his fourth podium of the season. He was crowned Moto2 Rookie of the year after the Japanese Grand Prix at Motegi, and finished his rookie season with 174 points to place fifth in the championship standings, scoring points in 16 of the 18 races.

Bagnaia opened the season with a win in Qatar, having led the race from start to finish. Bagnaia took a second win in Austin after a hard fight with Álex Márquez winning the race with a gap of 2.4 seconds and also setting the fastest lap of the race. At Jerez, Bagnaia finished third behind Lorenzo Baldassarri and Miguel Oliveira holding his starting grid position. Bagnaia took his first pole position in Moto2 at Le Mans, and like the race in Qatar he led from start to finish. The win was also his third podium at Le Mans since 2015. Bagnaia took a fourth win at Assen, starting the race from pole position and leading the entire race. After qualifying third on the grid in Sachsenring, Bagnaia finished the race down in 12th place, having been forced outside of the track after Mattia Pasini, who fell down in front of him in the last corner on the second lap, and despite being down in 26th, he made up fourteen places in two laps, including overtaking Álex Márquez the final corner of the last lap. At Brno Bagnaia finished third and lost the championship lead to Oliveira, but quickly retook the championship lead at Austria, winning his fifth race of the season. Bagnaia won his sixth race of the season at Misano from pole position. He took a fifth straight podium at Buriram, winning the race with his teammate Luca Marini in second place. He took his eighth win of the season at Motegi after Fabio Quartararo, who initially won the race, was disqualified due to low tyre pressure. After finishing third at Sepang he was crowned Moto2 World Champion with his 12th podium of the season, his teammate Luca Marini taking his first ever Moto2 win as well, his fifth podium of the campaign.

Bagnaia finished every single Moto2 race he participated in, 36 in total. He scored points in 34 of them and was on a 30-race point scoring streak, starting from Barcelona in 2017. The streak ended when he retired from his first MotoGP race at Losail.

=== MotoGP World Championship ===
==== Aspar Team Ducati testing (2016) ====
On November 15, 2016, he rode the Ducati Desmosedici GP with Aspar Team for the first time during a test at the Circuit Ricardo Tormo, Valencia that year. He followed Álvaro Bautista and Karel Abraham, the factory Ducati duo, on the bike in 2017.

==== Pramac Racing (2019–2020) ====
===== 2019 =====
After two seasons in the Moto2 category, Bagnaia was promoted up to take part in the 2019 MotoGP World Championship with Pramac Ducati. He was previously offered a ride in MotoGP in 2018 by Pramac after his stellar rookie season in 2017, where he took four podiums and finished fifth in the championship behind Franco Morbidelli, Thomas Lüthi, Miguel Oliveira, and Álex Márquez, but Bagnaia decided to stay, with an opportunity to take the championship title. He replaced fellow Italian rider Danilo Petrucci, who went to the Factory Ducati Team, replacing three-time MotoGP World Champion Jorge Lorenzo, who took the seat vacated at Repsol Honda Team by Dani Pedrosa after he decided to retire after 13 seasons in MotoGP, becoming an official test rider for KTM.

After failing to score points in Qatar, where he retired from the race due to a damaged front wing, Bagnaia took his first two points in the MotoGP World Championship with a 14th place in Argentina, having started the race from 17th on the grid. Bagnaia finished ninth in Austin getting positions after Marc Márquez and Cal Crutchlow crashed out from the race in separate accidents, and both Maverick Vinales and Joan Mir were penalised with ride through penalties for jumping the start. Prior to the fourth race at Jerez, Bagnaia had three straight podium finishes, starting from the 2016 Moto3 season. He qualified tenth on the grid but crashed out on the sixth lap, fighting with Pol Espargaro. At Le Mans, where Bagnaia won the Moto2 race in 2018, he crashed out on the sixth lap after an incident with Maverick Vinales. In the next race at Mugello, his home Grand Prix, Bagnaia had a solid start to the weekend. He topped the second Free Practice time sheets on his way to qualify eighth on the grid. However, he crashed in the last corner on the 11th lap while in seventh place. It was the first time in Bagnaia's career that he had failed to finish three races in a row, all of them with crashes. In Austria, Bagnaia had his best race weekend since his time in Moto2, both in terms of his qualifying, advancing to Q2 and starting from fifth on the grid, and race pace, managing to cross the line in seventh place. At Phillip Island, Bagnaia finished the race in fourth place, his best result of the season, missing the podium by just 0.055 seconds to his Ducati teammate Jack Miller. Bagnaia finished his rookie season in the premier class with 54 points, placing him 15th in the championship standings. He missed the final race at Valencia due to injury.

===== 2020 =====
For 2020, Bagnaia received a GP20 bike, the same as his teammate, Jack Miller. However, in a season that was majorly affected with races constantly being postponed or cancelled due to the ongoing COVID-19 pandemic, the first race in MotoGP wasn't held until 19 July at Jerez, with the first scheduled race at Losail being cancelled for the premier class. Despite this, Bagnaia had a strong first weekend, qualifying 4th on the grid and ultimately finishing the race in seventh position. In the next race, held at Jerez, Bagnaia was even stronger than the previous race, qualifying on the front row of the grid in third place. Unfortunately on lap 19, with six laps remaining, him well settled in to his second place and on his way to a maiden podium, he had to retire with engine failure. Next race weekend at Brno, Bagnaia crashed during FP1, breaking his leg, and he therefore missed the remainder of the weekend, and the two next races, being replaced by Michele Pirro. He returned for his home race at Misano, where he took his first podium of his MotoGP career, with a second-place finish behind Franco Morbidelli, fellow VR46 Academy member. He fell into a bit of a slump after his first podium however, only scoring eight points in the last six races, eventually finishing the season down in 16th place, with 47 points to his name.

==== Ducati Lenovo Team (2021–2026) ====
===== 2021 =====
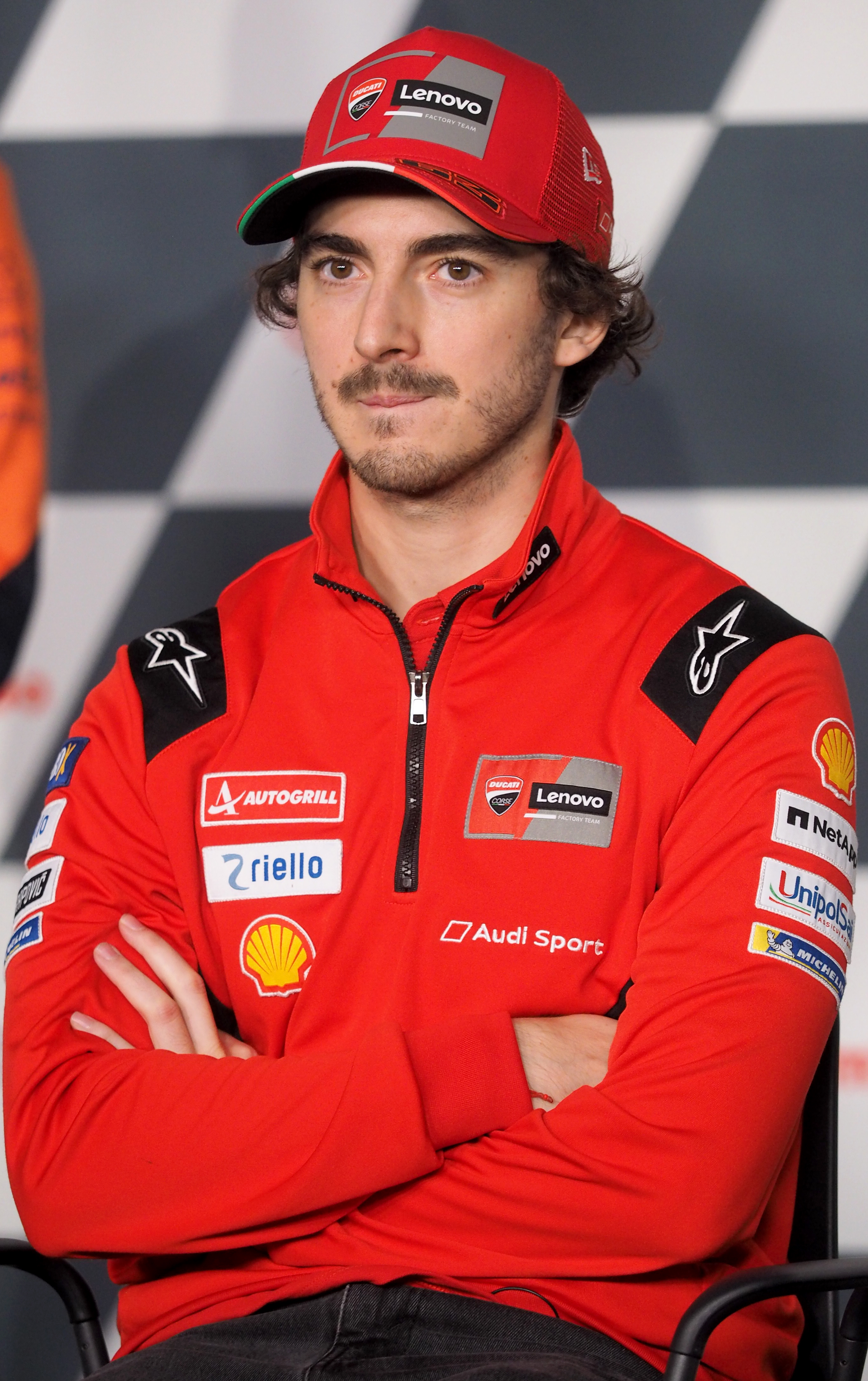
Bagnaia at the 2021 Algarve Grand Prix

For 2021, Bagnaia moved up to the factory Ducati team, along with former teammate Jack Miller. He started the season well, qualifying for pole position ahead of teammate Miller and the factory Yamaha riders Fabio Quartararo and Maverick Vinales, at the season opener in Losail. This marked his first career MotoGP pole position, and he would later finish the race in third. In the second race in Qatar, Bagnaia finished in sixth place. At Portimao, Bagnaia initially took pole position during Qualifying; however, his lap time was disallowed due to Miguel Oliveira's crash and yellow flag, which meant Bagnaia started the race from 11th. During the race, Bagnaia worked his way up to finish in second place behind Fabio Quartararo after Jack Miller, Alex Rins, and Johann Zarco all crashed out. He finished second the following race weekend in Jerez too, making it three podiums from four races. The middle of the season saw him score regular points, before he had another second place in Austria. Bagnaia took his maiden premier class win at Aragon, where he set the all time track record in qualifying, and led the entire race starting from pole, successfully defending seven overtakes by Marc Márquez during the final stages of the race. Bagnaia managed to repeat this achievement the following weekend in Rimini; he broke the lap record to take pole and led the entire race to take his second career victory in MotoGP. Bagnaia secured his third consecutive pole position in Austin, and finished the race in third, cutting the championship lead of Fabio Quartararo to 52 points, with three races remaining. In Misano, Bagnaia would continue his hot streak, getting pole position, setting the fastest lap of the race, before he crashed out of the lead with five laps to go, securing the title for Fabio Quartararo. This would not deter Bagnaia however, securing a fifth consecutive pole position in Portimao, something which has only been done in the premier class after the 1000cc rule change by Marc Márquez in 2014 and Fabio Quartararo earlier this season. He won the race in Portimao, as well as the season closer in Valencia, finishing second in the championship, with 252 points, 26 points behind World Champion Fabio Quartararo.

===== 2022 =====
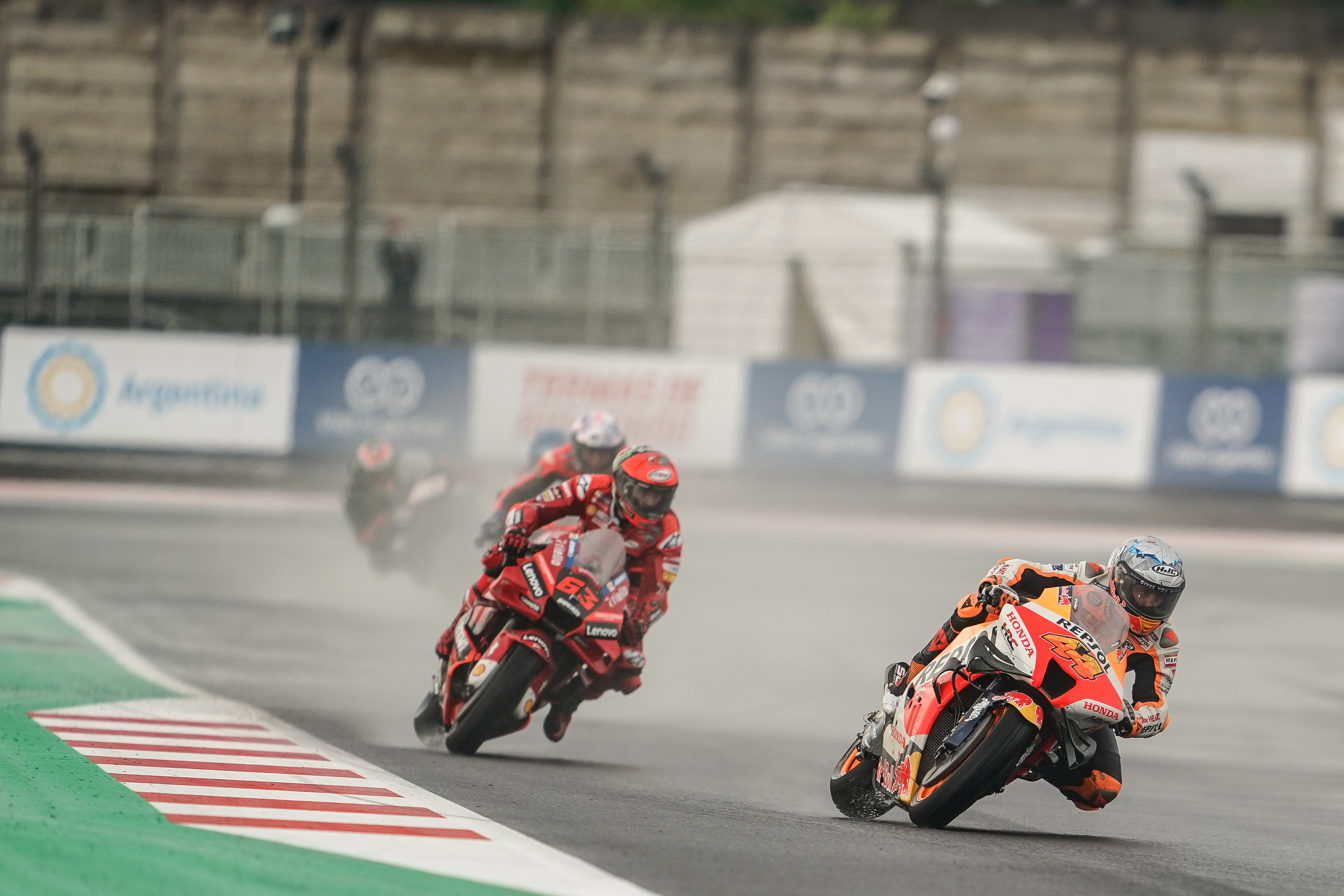
Bagnaia (#63) at the 2022 Indonesian Grand Prix

Going into the 2022 season, Bagnaia with a strong finish from the previous year, was picked as a Championship favourite for his second year with Ducati.

Bagnaia crashed out of eighth place taking the polesitter and fellow Ducati rider, Jorge Martín out at the opening race at Losail in Qatar. At the second round of the season, at a wet Mandalika circuit, Bagnaia took home a disappointing 15th place, collecting only one point in the opening two races of the season.

Two fifth places at COTA and the Argentinian Grand Prix and an eighth place in Portimao were followed up until Jerez, a track where Bagnaia has had success earlier in his career. He dominated the weekend, taking a record-breaking pole position and then leading from start to finish, picking up the second grand slam of his career. At Le Mans, Bagnaia once again dominated initially, leading the majority of the race; however, he was eventually caught up by Enea Bastianini who won the race, and Bagnaia crashed out of with seven laps to go. The next race at Mugello, Bagnaia had more of a mediocre start, qualifying in fifth spot he eventually caught up to and passed Marco Bezzecchi to the lead the remainder of the race for his second win of the season.

In Catalunya, Bagnaia was running third and was one of the favourites to take the victory but was taken out alongside Alex Rins by Takaaki Nakagami heading into the first corner, the race was won by Fabio Quartararo. Looking to bounce back at Sachsenring, Bagnaia however slid out from second place on lap 3. He was now at a 91-point deficit to Quartararo, the championship leader, and stood in sixth place in championship at the exact halfway point of the season.

After that race, Bagnaia turned his season around strongly. He went on to win the next four races in Assen, Silverstone, Red Bull Ring and Misano. He made history as the first Ducati rider and only the fourth rider in the MotoGP era to do so. The others being multi world champions Valentino Rossi, Marc Marquez and Jorge Lorenzo. He had gained 61 points on Fabio Quartararo in four races collecting a maximum of 100 points.

At Aragón, Bagnaia aimed for a fifth win in a row but had to settle for second to Enea Bastianini with a margin of just 0.042 seconds, being overtaken on the final lap. In a race where Fabio Quartararo crashed-out after riding into the back of Marc Márquez on the opening lap, Bagnaia once more managed to decrease the gap by 20 points, heading to Motegi with a ten-point deficit.

At the Japanese Grand Prix, while running in ninth position just behind Quartararo, Bagnaia crashed out of the race on the final lap, allowing Quartararo, who finished the race in eighth place, to increase his lead in the championship over Bagnaia to 18 points with four races to go in the season.

In the Thailand Grand Prix at Buriram and the Australian Grand Prix at Phillip Island, Bagnaia finished in third place while Quartararo failed to score on both occasions, leaving Bagnaia 14 points ahead of him with two races to go. At the Malaysian Grand Prix, Bagnaia could win the championship if he outscored Quartararo by 11 points. He picked up the seventh victory of his season after a poor qualifying session but Quartararo finishing third meant that the title would go down to the final round. At the Valencian Grand Prix, Bagnaia would then go on to win his maiden premier class championship and made history as he completed the largest points overhaul (−91) for a Championship winner in premier class history.

===== 2023 =====
Bagnaia continued with Ducati for 2023 and 2024 alongside a new teammate, Enea Bastianini who replaces Jack Miller.

For most of the season, Bagnaia was locked in a championship battle with Jorge Martín. Both riders exchanged sprint and race wins, though Bagnaia always held the lead of the championship except after the sprint race in Indonesia. Bagnaia won the championship after Martín's crash at the final race of the season in Valencia, finishing 39 points ahead. Thus, Bagnaia became a two-time premier class MotoGP World Champion, the first Ducati rider to successfully defend a riders' championship, and the only rider in the MotoGP era to win back to back titles after Valentino Rossi and Marc Marquez.

===== 2024 =====
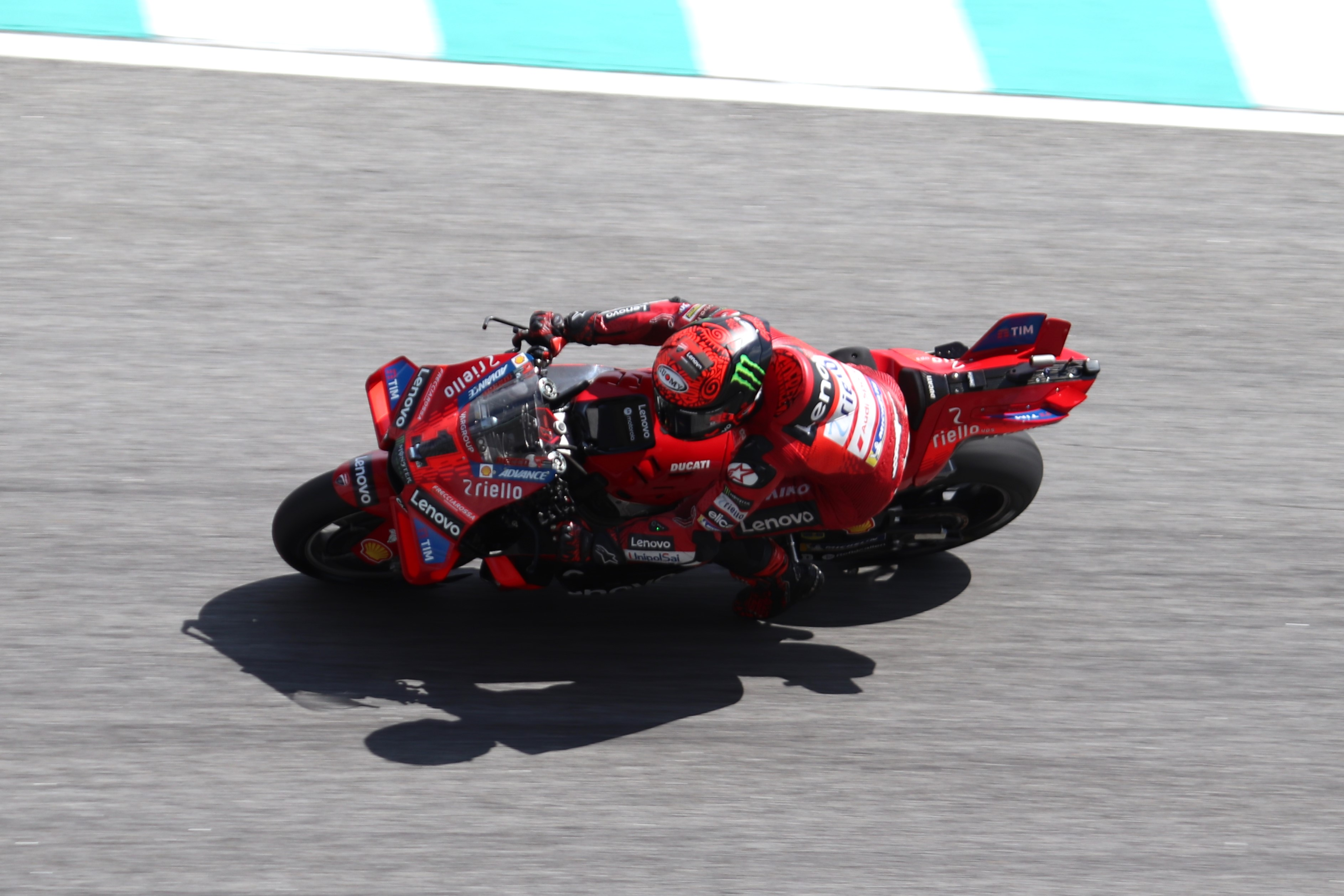
Bagnaia at the 2024 Malaysian Grand Prix

Ahead of the 2024 season, Bagnaia extended his contract to remain with Ducati until the end of 2026. By the end of 2024 Austrian Grand Prix, he won his 25th Premier class victory. He also matched last year's win total of 7 feature races. In the 2024 Aragon Grand Prix, after a collision with Álex Márquez, he found himself trailing 23 points behind Jorge Martín. He won his eighth feature race in 2024 Japanese Grand Prix to break his personal record to trim the deficit to Jorge Martín to ten points. After Australia and Thailand , Bagnaia was 17 points behind Martín. His crash in the sprint race at the penultimate round in Malaysia cost him further points as he was 29 points adrift of Martin. Pecco won the feature race in Malaysia, while Martin finished second. With a gap of 24 points, the winner was to be determined at the final round at Barcelona. Despite taking a hat-trick; pole position, sprint win, main race victory, Bagnaia finished as the championship runner-up in 2024, ten points behind Martín. His feature race win tally of 11 in the 2024 MotoGP season remains the most by any rider in the premier class in a single season not to win the title.

===== 2025 =====
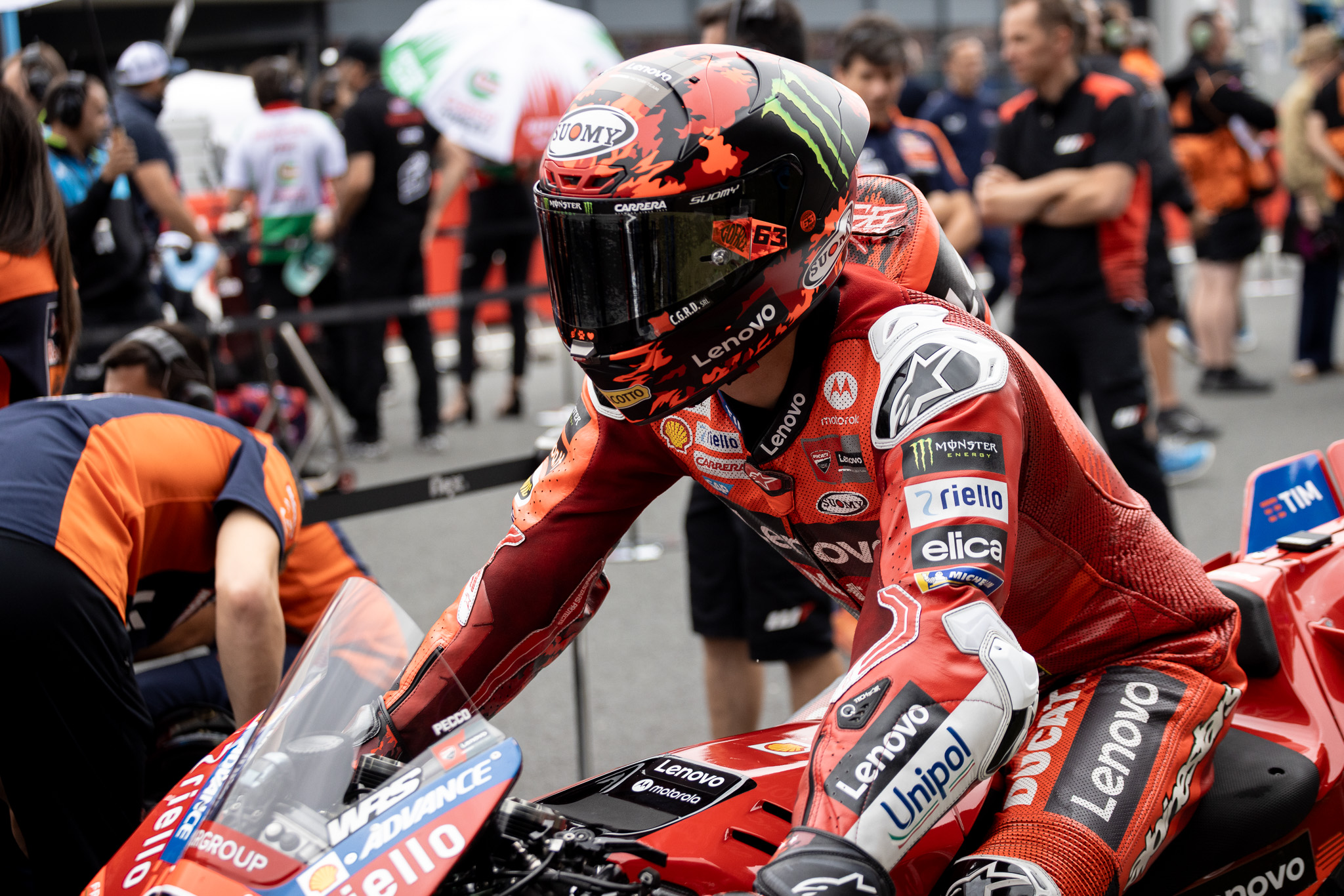
Bagnaia at the grid before the start of 2025 Dutch TT

On 5 June 2024, Bagnaia's teammate for 2025 and 2026 was confirmed to be eight-time World Champion Marc Márquez, replacing Enea Bastianini. Bagnaia struggled to match the pace of teammate Márquez, but nevertheless seized advantage at the Grand Prix of the Americas to win his first race of 2025 after Márquez had crashed. His start to the season also saw strong consistency until the French Grand Prix, where he crashed in both the sprint and feature race. However, a mid-season slump saw Bagnaia struggle to match the form of teammate Márquez, trailing him by 168 points by the summer break. He saw a brief return to form at the Japanese round, securing pole position and both sprint and feature race wins. However, Bagnaia faced five consecutive DNFs in the next rounds in Indonesia, Australia, Malaysia, Portugal, and Valencia.

===== 2026 =====
After six seasons at the team, Bagnaia is set to part ways with Ducati at the end of the season.

==== Aprilia Racing (2027–) ====
===== 2027 =====
Bagnaia is set to partner Marco Bezzecchi at the Aprilia factory team in 2027, on a four-year deal.

== Career statistics ==
=== CEV 125cc Championship ===
==== Races by year ====
(key) (Races in bold indicate pole position, races in italics indicate fastest lap)

| Year | Bike | 1 | 2 | 3 | 4 | 5 | 6 | 7 | Pos | Pts |
|---|---|---|---|---|---|---|---|---|---|---|
| 2011 | Honda | JER; 7 | ARA; 7 | CAT; Ret | ALB1; 2 | ALB2; 1 | VAL; 5 | JER; Ret | 3rd | 74 |

=== CEV Buckler Moto3 Championship ===
==== Races by year ====
(key) (Races in bold indicate pole position, races in italics indicate fastest lap)

| Year | Bike | 1 | 2 | 3 | 4 | 5 | 6 | 7 | Pos | Pts |
|---|---|---|---|---|---|---|---|---|---|---|
| 2012 | Honda | JER; 8 | NAV; 2 | ARA; Ret | **CAT**; 1 | ALB1; Ret | ALB2; 2 | VAL; Ret | 3rd | 73 |

=== Grand Prix motorcycle racing ===
==== By season ====
| Season | Class | Motorcycle | Team | Race | Win | Podium | Pole | FLap | Pts | Plcd | WCh |
|---|---|---|---|---|---|---|---|---|---|---|---|
| 2013 | Moto3 | FTR Honda | San Carlo Team Italia | 17 | 0 | 0 | 0 | 0 | 0 | NC | – |
| 2014 | Moto3 | KTM | Sky Racing Team VR46 | 16 | 0 | 0 | 0 | 1 | 50 | 16th | – |
| 2015 | Moto3 | Mahindra | Mapfre Team Mahindra | 18 | 0 | 1 | 0 | 1 | 76 | 14th | – |
| 2016 | Moto3 | Mahindra | Pull & Bear Aspar Mahindra Team | 18 | 2 | 6 | 1 | 0 | 145 | 4th | – |
| 2017 | Moto2 | Kalex | Sky Racing Team VR46 | 18 | 0 | 4 | 0 | 0 | 174 | 5th | – |
| 2018 | Moto2 | Kalex | Sky Racing Team VR46 | 18 | 8 | 12 | 6 | 3 | 306 | **1st** | 1 |
| 2019 | MotoGP | Ducati | Pramac Racing | 18 | 0 | 0 | 0 | 0 | 54 | 15th | – |
| 2020 | MotoGP | Ducati | Pramac Racing | 11 | 0 | 1 | 0 | 2 | 47 | 16th | – |
| 2021 | MotoGP | Ducati | Ducati Lenovo Team | 18 | 4 | 9 | 6 | 4 | 252 | **2nd** | – |
| 2022 | MotoGP | Ducati | Ducati Lenovo Team | 20 | 7 | 10 | 5 | 3 | 265 | **1st** | 1 |
| 2023 | MotoGP | Ducati | Ducati Lenovo Team | 19 | 7 | 15 | 7 | 3 | 467 | **1st** | 1 |
| 2024 | MotoGP | Ducati | Ducati Lenovo Team | 20 | 11 | 16 | 6 | 6 | 498 | **2nd** | – |
| 2025 | MotoGP | Ducati | Ducati Lenovo Team | 22 | 2 | 8 | 3 | 2 | 288 | 5th | – |
| 2026 | MotoGP | Ducati | Ducati Lenovo Team | 18 | 0 | 4 | 1 | 2 | 173* | 9th* | – |
| Total | | | | **251** | **41** | **86** | **35** | **27** | **2795** | | **3** |

==== By class ====
| Class | Seasons | 1st GP | 1st pod | 1st win | Race | Win | Podiums | Pole | FLap | Pts | WChmp |
|---|---|---|---|---|---|---|---|---|---|---|---|
| Moto3 | 2013–2016 | 2013 Qatar | 2015 France | 2016 Netherlands | 69 | 2 | 7 | 1 | 2 | 271 | 0 |
| Moto2 | 2017–2018 | 2017 Qatar | 2017 Spain | 2018 Qatar | 36 | 8 | 16 | 6 | 3 | 480 | 1 |
| MotoGP | 2019–present | 2019 Qatar | 2020 San Marino | 2021 Aragon | 146 | 31 | 63 | 28 | 22 | 2044 | 2 |
| Total | 2013–present | | | | **251** | **41** | **86** | **35** | **27** | **2795** | **3** |

==== Races by year ====
(key) (Races in bold indicate pole position; races in italics indicate fastest lap; ^{superscript} indicates point-scoring sprint position)

| Year | Class | Bike | 1 | 2 | 3 | 4 | 5 | 6 | 7 | 8 | 9 | 10 | 11 | 12 | 13 | 14 | 15 | 16 | 17 | 18 | 19 | 20 | 21 | 22 | Pos | Pts |
|---|---|---|---|---|---|---|---|---|---|---|---|---|---|---|---|---|---|---|---|---|---|---|---|---|---|---|
| 2013 | Moto3 | FTR Honda | QAT; 23 | AME; 22 | SPA; 26 | FRA; 20 | ITA; 24 | CAT; 17 | NED; 26 | GER; 30 | INP; Ret | CZE; 28 | GBR; Ret | RSM; Ret | ARA; 17 | MAL; 16 | AUS; Ret | JPN; 20 | VAL; Ret | | | | | | NC | 0 |
| 2014 | Moto3 | KTM | QAT; 10 | AME; 7 | ARG; Ret | SPA; 8 | FRA; 4 | ITA; Ret | CAT; 10 | NED; DNS | GER; DNS | INP; Ret | CZE; 17 | GBR; 21 | RSM; Ret | ARA; 24 | JPN; 13 | AUS; 11 | MAL; Ret | VAL; 16 | | | | | 16th | 50 |
| 2015 | Moto3 | Mahindra | QAT; 9 | AME; Ret | ARG; 11 | SPA; 7 | FRA; 3 | ITA; 4 | CAT; 20 | NED; 11 | GER; Ret | INP; Ret | CZE; 12 | GBR; Ret | RSM; 8 | ARA; 11 | JPN; 15 | AUS; Ret | MAL; 17 | VAL; 13 | | | | | 14th | 76 |
| 2016 | Moto3 | Mahindra | QAT; 3 | ARG; 23 | AME; 14 | SPA; 3 | FRA; 12 | ITA; 3 | CAT; Ret | NED; 1 | GER; 10 | AUT; 11 | CZE; Ret | **GBR**; 2 | RSM; 21 | ARA; 16 | JPN; 6 | AUS; Ret | MAL; 1 | VAL; Ret | | | | | 4th | 145 |
| 2017 | Moto2 | Kalex | QAT; 12 | ARG; 7 | AME; 16 | SPA; 2 | FRA; 2 | ITA; 22 | CAT; 13 | NED; 10 | GER; 3 | CZE; 7 | AUT; 4 | GBR; 5 | RSM; 3 | ARA; 10 | JPN; 4 | AUS; 12 | MAL; 5 | VAL; 4 | | | | | 5th | 174 |
| 2018 | Moto2 | Kalex | QAT; 1 | ARG; 9 | AME; 1 | SPA; 3 | **FRA**; 1 | ITA; 4 | CAT; 8 | **NED**; 1 | GER; 12 | CZE; 3 | **AUT**; 1 | **GBR**; C | **RSM**; 1 | ARA; 2 | THA; 1 | **JPN**; 1 | AUS; 12 | MAL; 3 | VAL; 14 | | | | 1st | 306 |
| 2019 | MotoGP | Ducati | QAT; Ret | ARG; 14 | AME; 9 | SPA; Ret | FRA; Ret | ITA; Ret | CAT; Ret | NED; 14 | GER; 17 | CZE; 12 | AUT; 7 | GBR; 11 | RSM; Ret | ARA; 16 | THA; 11 | JPN; 13 | AUS; 4 | MAL; 12 | VAL; DNS | | | | 15th | 54 |
| 2020 | MotoGP | Ducati | SPA; 7 | ANC; Ret | CZE; DNS | AUT | STY | RSM; 2 | EMI; Ret | CAT; 6 | FRA; 13 | ARA; Ret | TER; Ret | EUR; Ret | VAL; 11 | POR; Ret | | | | | | | | | 16th | 47 |
| 2021 | MotoGP | Ducati | **QAT**; 3 | DOH; 6 | POR; 2 | SPA; 2 | FRA; 4 | ITA; Ret | CAT; 7 | GER; 5 | NED; 6 | STY; 11 | AUT; 2 | GBR; 14 | **ARA**; 1 | **RSM**; 1 | **AME**; 3 | **EMI**; Ret | **ALR**; 1 | VAL; 1 | | | | | 2nd | 252 |
| 2022 | MotoGP | Ducati | QAT; Ret | INA; 15 | ARG; 5 | AME; 5 | POR; 8 | **SPA**; 1 | **FRA**; Ret | ITA; 1 | CAT; Ret | **GER**; Ret | **NED**; 1 | GBR; 1 | AUT; 1 | RSM; 1 | **ARA**; 2 | JPN; Ret | THA; 3 | AUS; 3 | MAL; 1 | VAL; 9 | | | 1st | 265 |
| 2023 | MotoGP | Ducati | POR; 1^{1} | ARG; 16^{6} | **AME**; Ret^{1} | SPA; 1^{2} | **FRA**; Ret^{3} | **ITA**; 1^{1} | **GER**; 2^{2} | NED; 1^{2} | GBR; 2 | **AUT**; 1^{1} | **CAT**; DNS^{2} | RSM; 3^{3} | IND; Ret^{2} | JPN; 2^{3} | INA; 1^{8} | AUS; 2 | THA; 2^{7} | **MAL**; 3^{3} | QAT; 2^{5} | VAL; 1^{5} | | | 1st | 467 |
| 2024 | MotoGP | Ducati | QAT; 1^{4} | POR; Ret^{4} | AME; 5^{8} | SPA; 1 | FRA; 3 | CAT; 1 | ITA; 1^{1} | **NED**; 1^{1} | GER; 1^{3} | GBR; 3 | AUT; 1^{1} | ARA; Ret^{9} | **RSM**; 2^{2} | **EMI**; Ret^{1} | INA; 3^{1} | JPN; 1^{1} | AUS; 3^{4} | **THA**; 1^{3} | **MAL**; 1 | **SLD**; 1^{1} | | | 2nd | 498 |
| 2025 | MotoGP | Ducati | THA; 3^{3} | ARG; 4^{3} | AME; 1^{3} | QAT; 2^{8} | SPA; 3^{3} | FRA; 16 | GBR; Ret^{6} | ARA; 3 | ITA; 4^{3} | NED; 3^{5} | GER; 3 | **CZE**; 4^{7} | AUT; 8 | HUN; 9 | CAT; 7 | RSM; Ret | **JPN**; 1^{1} | INA; Ret | AUS; Ret | **MAL**; Ret^{1} | POR; Ret^{8} | VAL; Ret | 5th | 288 |
| 2026 | MotoGP | Ducati | THA; 9^{9} | BRA; Ret^{8} | USA; 10^{2} | SPA; Ret^{2} | **FRA**; Ret^{2} | CAT; 3^{6} | ITA; 3^{7} | HUN; 3^{9} | CZE; 3^{1} | NED; Ret^{7} | GER; 6^{7} | GBR; Ret | ARA; Ret | RSM; Ret | AUT; 7^{6} | JPN; 8 | INA; Ret^{8} | AUS; C | MAL; 13^{6} | QAT; DNS | POR | VAL | 9th* | 173* |

* Season still in progress.

== Personal life ==
Bagnaia is known as Pecco because his older sister Carola, when learning to talk, could not pronounce Francesco, and the nickname has stayed with him all of his life. Francesco Bagnaia married his longtime girlfriend Domizia Castagnini. They were married in the Duomo di Pesaro on 20 July 2024.

On 5 July 2022, Bagnaia was involved in a DUI crash in the early morning on the Spanish island of Ibiza. It was reported that he failed a breathalyser test, with his blood alcohol content more than three times the legal limit for driving in Spain. Bagnaia stated he left a nightclub at around 3 am, and failed to negotiate a roundabout, with the front end of the car ending off the road. He stated he was celebrating a race win at Assen, and was normally a very light drinker.
