= 2018 Motorcycle Grand Prix of the Americas =

(United States) 2018 Grand Prix of the Americas
Race details
- Race 3 of 19 races in the 2018 Grand Prix motorcycle racing season
- Date: April 22, 2018
- Official name: Red Bull Grand Prix of the Americas
- Location: Circuit of the Americas, Austin, United States
- Course: Permanent racing facility; 5.513 km (3.426 mi)

MotoGP
Pole position
Rider	(Spain) Marc Márquez (Note: Marc Márquez, who set the fastest time in qualifying, received a grid penalty which promoted Maverick Viñales to the pole position grid slot.)	Honda
Time	2:03.658	
Fastest lap
Rider	(Spain) Marc Márquez	Honda
Time	2:04.605 on lap 5	
Podium
First	(Spain) Marc Márquez	Honda
Second	(Spain) Maverick Viñales	Yamaha
Third	(Italy) Andrea Iannone	Suzuki

Moto2
Pole position
Rider	(Spain) Álex Márquez	Kalex
Time	2:10.588	
Fastest lap
Rider	(Italy) Francesco Bagnaia	Kalex
Time	2:11.020 on lap 6	
Podium
First	(Italy) Francesco Bagnaia	Kalex
Second	(Spain) Álex Márquez	Kalex
Third	(Portugal) Miguel Oliveira	KTM

Moto3
Pole position
Rider	(Spain) Jorge Martín	Honda
Time	2:18.629	
Fastest lap
Rider	(Italy) Enea Bastianini	Honda
Time	2:17.496 on lap 14	
Podium
First	(Spain) Jorge Martín	Honda
Second	(Italy) Enea Bastianini	Honda
Third	(Italy) Marco Bezzecchi	KTM

The 2018 Motorcycle Grand Prix of the Americas was the third round of the 2018 MotoGP season. It was held at the Circuit of the Americas in Austin on April 22, 2018.

== Classification ==
=== MotoGP ===
Pos.	No.	Rider	Team	Manufacturer	Laps	Time/Retired	Grid	Points
1	93	(Spain) Marc Márquez	Repsol Honda Team	Honda	20	41:52.002	4 (Note: 3-place grid penalty.)	25
2	25	(Spain) Maverick Viñales	Movistar Yamaha MotoGP	Yamaha	20	+3.560	1	20
3	29	(Italy) Andrea Iannone	Team Suzuki Ecstar	Suzuki	20	+6.704	2	16
4	46	(Italy) Valentino Rossi	Movistar Yamaha MotoGP	Yamaha	20	+9.587	5	13
5	4	(Italy) Andrea Dovizioso	Ducati Team	Ducati	20	+13.570	8	11
6	5	(France) Johann Zarco	Monster Yamaha Tech 3	Yamaha	20	+14.231	3	10
7	26	(Spain) Dani Pedrosa	Repsol Honda Team	Honda	20	+18.201	9	9
8	53	(Spain) Tito Rabat	Reale Avintia Racing	Ducati	20	+28.537	13	8
9	43	(Australia) Jack Miller	Alma Pramac Racing	Ducati	20	+28.671	18	7
10	41	(Spain) Aleix Espargaró	Aprilia Racing Team Gresini	Aprilia	20	+28.875	19	6
11	99	(Spain) Jorge Lorenzo	Ducati Team	Ducati	20	+31.355	6	5
12	9	(Italy) Danilo Petrucci	Alma Pramac Racing	Ducati	20	+34.993	10	4
13	44	(Spain) Pol Espargaró	Red Bull KTM Factory Racing	KTM	20	+37.264	15	3
14	30	(Japan) Takaaki Nakagami	LCR Honda Idemitsu	Honda	20	+39.335	12	2
15	19	(Spain) Álvaro Bautista	Ángel Nieto Team	Ducati	20	+40.887	21	1
16	38	(United Kingdom) Bradley Smith	Red Bull KTM Factory Racing	KTM	20	+48.475	14	
17	45	(United Kingdom) Scott Redding	Aprilia Racing Team Gresini	Aprilia	20	+49.995	22	
18	12	(Switzerland) Thomas Lüthi	EG 0,0 Marc VDS	Honda	20	+51.115	20	
19	35	(United Kingdom) Cal Crutchlow	LCR Honda Castrol	Honda	20	+59.055 (Note: 2.7-second penalty.)	7	
20	10	(Belgium) Xavier Siméon	Reale Avintia Racing	Ducati	20	+59.747	24	
21	21	(Italy) Franco Morbidelli	EG 0,0 Marc VDS	Honda	20	+1:00.513	17	
Ret	42	(Spain) Álex Rins	Team Suzuki Ecstar	Suzuki	10	Accident	11	
Ret	55	(Malaysia) Hafizh Syahrin	Monster Yamaha Tech 3	Yamaha	8	Accident	16	
Ret	17	(Czech Republic) Karel Abraham	Ángel Nieto Team	Ducati	8	Rider In Pain	23	

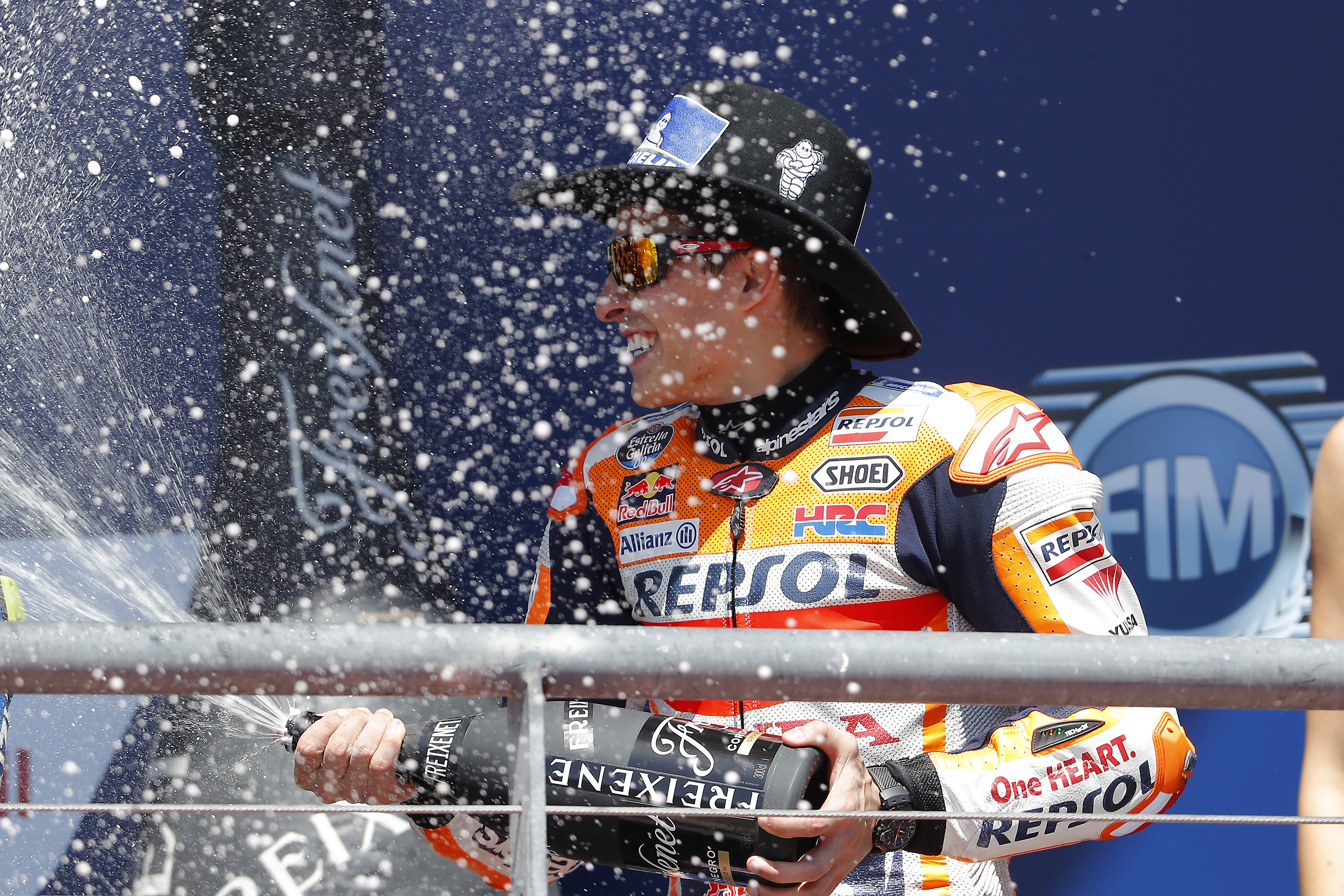
Marc Márquez, spraying the champagne on the podium after winning the MotoGP race.

=== Moto2 ===
Pos.	No.	Rider	Manufacturer	Laps	Time/Retired	Grid	Points
1	42	(Italy) Francesco Bagnaia	Kalex	18	39:30.016	4	25
2	73	(Spain) Álex Márquez	Kalex	18	+2.464	1	20
3	44	(Portugal) Miguel Oliveira	KTM	18	+3.704	12	16
4	36	(Spain) Joan Mir	Kalex	18	+5.376	5	13
5	27	(Spain) Iker Lecuona	KTM	18	+6.867	13	11
6	41	(South Africa) Brad Binder	KTM	18	+6.876	16	10
7	54	(Italy) Mattia Pasini	Kalex	18	+9.308	3	9
8	9	(Spain) Jorge Navarro	Kalex	18	+10.510	19	8
9	77	(Switzerland) Dominique Aegerter	KTM	18	+10.595	11	7
10	7	(Italy) Lorenzo Baldassarri	Kalex	18	+11.497	17	6
11	32	(Spain) Isaac Viñales	Kalex	18	+12.339	10	5
12	24	(Italy) Simone Corsi	Kalex	18	+13.458	14	4
13	10	(Italy) Luca Marini	Kalex	18	+14.282	6	3
14	5	(Italy) Andrea Locatelli	Kalex	18	+14.548	21	2
15	20	(France) Fabio Quartararo	Speed Up	18	+17.169	9	1
16	13	(Italy) Romano Fenati	Kalex	18	+20.609	15	
17	87	(Australia) Remy Gardner	Tech 3	18	+20.821	18	
18	40	(Spain) Héctor Barberá	Kalex	18	+27.068	20	
19	45	(Japan) Tetsuta Nagashima	Kalex	18	+27.245	26	
20	64	(Netherlands) Bo Bendsneyder	Tech 3	18	+32.144	23	
21	4	(South Africa) Steven Odendaal	NTS	18	+38.350	29	
22	51	(Brazil) Eric Granado	Suter	18	+38.579	24	
23	16	(United States) Joe Roberts	NTS	18	+44.257	27	
24	22	(United Kingdom) Sam Lowes	KTM	18	+45.289	2	
25	89	(Malaysia) Khairul Idham Pawi	Kalex	18	+46.966	25	
26	95	(France) Jules Danilo	Kalex	18	+1:10.364	30	
27	63	(Malaysia) Zulfahmi Khairuddin	Kalex	18	+1:27.099	31	
28	21	(Italy) Federico Fuligni	Kalex	18	+1:27.257	32	
Ret	97	(Spain) Xavi Vierge	Kalex	13	Accident	7	
Ret	62	(Italy) Stefano Manzi	Suter	11	Accident Damage	28	
Ret	23	(Germany) Marcel Schrötter	Kalex	6	Accident	8	
Ret	52	(United Kingdom) Danny Kent	Speed Up	3	Accident	22	
OFFICIAL MOTO2 REPORT

=== Moto3 ===
Pos.	No.	Rider	Manufacturer	Laps	Time/Retired	Grid	Points
1	88	(Spain) Jorge Martín	Honda	17	39:12.869	1	25
2	33	(Italy) Enea Bastianini	Honda	17	+1.451	6	20
3	12	(Italy) Marco Bezzecchi	KTM	17	+4.112	9	16
4	16	(Italy) Andrea Migno	KTM	17	+4.172	16	13
5	21	(Italy) Fabio Di Giannantonio	Honda	17	+4.186	5	11
6	65	(Germany) Philipp Öttl	KTM	17	+4.374	11	10
7	84	(Czech Republic) Jakub Kornfeil	KTM	17	+5.452	21	9
8	44	(Spain) Arón Canet	Honda	17	+7.971	2	8
9	24	(Japan) Tatsuki Suzuki	Honda	17	+8.287	4	7
10	11	(Belgium) Livio Loi	KTM	17	+8.711	26	6
11	71	(Japan) Ayumu Sasaki	Honda	17	+10.909	8	5
12	19	(Argentina) Gabriel Rodrigo	KTM	17	+13.745	12	4
13	40	(South Africa) Darryn Binder	KTM	17	+14.532	15	3
14	17	(United Kingdom) John McPhee	KTM	17	+16.071	3	2
15	75	(Spain) Albert Arenas	KTM	17	+16.181	24	1
16	10	(Italy) Dennis Foggia	KTM	17	+19.895	7	
17	72	(Spain) Alonso López	Honda	17	+23.516	22	
18	48	(Italy) Lorenzo Dalla Porta	Honda	17	+23.757	17	
19	76	(Kazakhstan) Makar Yurchenko	KTM	17	+25.424	18	
20	14	(Italy) Tony Arbolino	Honda	17	+25.439	20	
21	5	(Spain) Jaume Masiá	KTM	17	+33.897	10	
22	22	(Japan) Kazuki Masaki	KTM	17	+38.352	27	
23	41	(Thailand) Nakarin Atiratphuvapat	Honda	17	+38.362	13	
24	23	(Italy) Niccolò Antonelli	Honda	17	+59.078	19	
Ret	42	(Spain) Marcos Ramírez	KTM	12	Handling	14	
Ret	8	(Italy) Nicolò Bulega	KTM	5	Accident	23	
Ret	7	(Malaysia) Adam Norrodin	Honda	2	Accident Damage	25	
Ret	27	(Japan) Kaito Toba	Honda	1	Accident Damage	28	
OFFICIAL MOTO3 REPORT

== Championship standings after the race ==
=== MotoGP ===
Pos.	Rider	Points
1	(Italy) Andrea Dovizioso	46
2	(Spain) Marc Márquez	45
3	(Spain) Maverick Viñales	41
4	(United Kingdom) Cal Crutchlow	38
5	(France) Johann Zarco	38
6	(Italy) Andrea Iannone	31
7	(Italy) Valentino Rossi	29
8	(Australia) Jack Miller	26
9	(Spain) Tito Rabat	22
10	(Italy) Danilo Petrucci	21

=== Moto2 ===
Pos.	Rider	Points
1	(Italy) Francesco Bagnaia	57
2	(Italy) Mattia Pasini	47
3	(Spain) Álex Márquez	47
4	(Portugal) Miguel Oliveira	43
5	(Italy) Lorenzo Baldassarri	39
6	(Spain) Xavi Vierge	28
7	(Spain) Joan Mir	27
8	(South Africa) Brad Binder	20
9	(Spain) Iker Lecuona	16
10	(Switzerland) Dominique Aegerter	16

=== Moto3 ===
Pos.	Rider	Points
1	(Spain) Jorge Martín	55
2	(Spain) Arón Canet	48
3	(Italy) Marco Bezzecchi	43
4	(Italy) Fabio Di Giannantonio	37
5	(Italy) Enea Bastianini	33
6	(Italy) Lorenzo Dalla Porta	25
7	(Italy) Andrea Migno	22
8	(Argentina) Gabriel Rodrigo	22
9	(Italy) Niccolò Antonelli	21
10	(Czech Republic) Jakub Kornfeil	18

== Notes ==
Previous race: 2018 Argentine Grand Prix	FIM Grand Prix World Championship; 2018 season	Next race: 2018 Spanish Grand Prix
Previous race: 2017 Grand Prix of the Americas	Motorcycle Grand Prix of the Americas	Next race: 2019 Grand Prix of the Americas
