= 2018 Spanish motorcycle Grand Prix =

(Spain) 2018 Spanish Grand Prix
Race details
- Race 4 of 19 races in the 2018 Grand Prix motorcycle racing season
- Date: 6 May 2018
- Official name: Gran Premio Red Bull de España
- Location: Circuito de Jerez – Ángel Nieto, Jerez de la Frontera, Spain
- Course: Permanent racing facility; 4.423 km (2.748 mi)

MotoGP
Pole position
Rider	(United Kingdom) Cal Crutchlow	Honda
Time	1:37.653	
Fastest lap
Rider	(Spain) Marc Márquez	Honda
Time	1:39.159 on lap 16	
Podium
First	(Spain) Marc Márquez	Honda
Second	(France) Johann Zarco	Yamaha
Third	(Italy) Andrea Iannone	Suzuki

Moto2
Pole position
Rider	(Italy) Lorenzo Baldassarri	Kalex
Time	1:41.925	
Fastest lap
Rider	(Italy) Lorenzo Baldassarri	Kalex
Time	1:42.480 on lap 5	
Podium
First	(Italy) Lorenzo Baldassarri	Kalex
Second	(Portugal) Miguel Oliveira	KTM
Third	(Italy) Francesco Bagnaia	Kalex

Moto3
Pole position
Rider	(Spain) Jorge Martín	Honda
Time	1:46.193	
Fastest lap
Rider	(Spain) Alonso López	Honda
Time	1:46.730 on lap 2	
Podium
First	(Germany) Philipp Öttl	KTM
Second	(Italy) Marco Bezzecchi	KTM
Third	(Spain) Marcos Ramírez	KTM

The 2018 Spanish motorcycle Grand Prix was the fourth round of the 2018 MotoGP season. It was held at the Circuito de Jerez – Ángel Nieto in Jerez de la Frontera on 6 May 2018.

== Classification ==
=== MotoGP ===
Pos.	No.	Rider	Team	Manufacturer	Laps	Time/Retired	Grid	Points
1	93	(Spain) Marc Márquez	Repsol Honda Team	Honda	25	41:39.678	5	25
2	5	(France) Johann Zarco	Monster Yamaha Tech 3	Yamaha	25	+5.241	3	20
3	29	(Italy) Andrea Iannone	Team Suzuki Ecstar	Suzuki	25	+8.214	7	16
4	9	(Italy) Danilo Petrucci	Alma Pramac Racing	Ducati	25	+8.617	9	13
5	46	(Italy) Valentino Rossi	Movistar Yamaha MotoGP	Yamaha	25	+8.743	10	11
6	43	(Australia) Jack Miller	Alma Pramac Racing	Ducati	25	+9.768	12	10
7	25	(Spain) Maverick Viñales	Movistar Yamaha MotoGP	Yamaha	25	+13.543	11	9
8	19	(Spain) Álvaro Bautista	Ángel Nieto Team	Ducati	25	+14.076	20	8
9	21	(Italy) Franco Morbidelli	EG 0,0 Marc VDS	Honda	25	+16.822	15	7
10	36	(Finland) Mika Kallio	Red Bull KTM Factory Racing	KTM	25	+19.405	19	6
11	44	(Spain) Pol Espargaró	Red Bull KTM Factory Racing	KTM	25	+21.149	16	5
12	30	(Japan) Takaaki Nakagami	LCR Honda Idemitsu	Honda	25	+21.174	14	4
13	38	(United Kingdom) Bradley Smith	Red Bull KTM Factory Racing	KTM	25	+21.765	21	3
14	53	(Spain) Tito Rabat	Reale Avintia Racing	Ducati	25	+22.103	17	2
15	45	(United Kingdom) Scott Redding	Aprilia Racing Team Gresini	Aprilia	25	+36.755	25	1
16	55	(Malaysia) Hafizh Syahrin	Monster Yamaha Tech 3	Yamaha	25	+41.861	22	
17	10	(Belgium) Xavier Siméon	Reale Avintia Racing	Ducati	25	+49.241	24	
18	17	(Czech Republic) Karel Abraham	Ángel Nieto Team	Ducati	24	+1 lap	23	
Ret	99	(Spain) Jorge Lorenzo	Ducati Team	Ducati	17	Collision	4	
Ret	4	(Italy) Andrea Dovizioso	Ducati Team	Ducati	17	Collision	8	
Ret	26	(Spain) Dani Pedrosa	Repsol Honda Team	Honda	17	Collision	2	
Ret	35	(United Kingdom) Cal Crutchlow	LCR Honda Castrol	Honda	16	Accident Damage	1	
Ret	12	(Switzerland) Thomas Lüthi	EG 0,0 Marc VDS	Honda	11	Accident	18	
Ret	42	(Spain) Álex Rins	Team Suzuki Ecstar	Suzuki	5	Accident	6	
Ret	41	(Spain) Aleix Espargaró	Aprilia Racing Team Gresini	Aprilia	0	Pneumatics	13	

=== Moto2 ===
Pos.	No.	Rider	Manufacturer	Laps	Time/Retired	Grid	Points
1	7	(Italy) Lorenzo Baldassarri	Kalex	23	39:33.889	1	25
2	44	(Portugal) Miguel Oliveira	KTM	23	+2.851	14	20
3	42	(Italy) Francesco Bagnaia	Kalex	23	+6.250	3	16
4	97	(Spain) Xavi Vierge	Kalex	23	+6.953	7	13
5	54	(Italy) Mattia Pasini	Kalex	23	+10.138	10	11
6	41	(South Africa) Brad Binder	KTM	23	+11.731	5	10
7	23	(Germany) Marcel Schrötter	Kalex	23	+18.138	20 (Note: 3-place grid penalty.)	9
8	22	(United Kingdom) Sam Lowes	KTM	23	+18.677	8	8
9	27	(Spain) Iker Lecuona	KTM	23	+20.743	18	7
10	20	(France) Fabio Quartararo	Speed Up	23	+20.787	17	6
11	36	(Spain) Joan Mir	Kalex	23	+23.202	6	5
12	24	(Italy) Simone Corsi	Kalex	23	+23.419	13	4
13	45	(Japan) Tetsuta Nagashima	Kalex	23	+26.132	16	3
14	40	(Spain) Héctor Barberá	Kalex	23	+26.951	15	2
15	5	(Italy) Andrea Locatelli	Kalex	23	+27.121	19	1
16	64	(Netherlands) Bo Bendsneyder	Tech 3	23	+27.377	23	
17	9	(Spain) Jorge Navarro	Kalex	23	+33.193	4	
18	89	(Malaysia) Khairul Idham Pawi	Kalex	23	+33.834	25	
19	32	(Spain) Isaac Viñales	Kalex	23	+44.651	21	
20	3	(Germany) Lukas Tulovic	KTM	23	+49.048	24	
21	21	(Italy) Federico Fuligni	Kalex	23	+50.333	32	
22	18	(Andorra) Xavi Cardelús	Kalex	23	+53.016	31	
23	14	(Spain) Héctor Garzó	Tech 3	23	+59.489	30	
24	95	(France) Jules Danilo	Kalex	22	+1 lap	29	
Ret	4	(South Africa) Steven Odendaal	NTS	21	Accident Damage	26	
Ret	16	(United States) Joe Roberts	NTS	18	Accident	27	
Ret	73	(Spain) Álex Márquez	Kalex	10	Accident	2	
Ret	52	(United Kingdom) Danny Kent	Speed Up	10	Accident	11	
Ret	63	(Malaysia) Zulfahmi Khairuddin	Kalex	9	Accident	33	
Ret	62	(Italy) Stefano Manzi	Suter	8	Handling	22	
Ret	13	(Italy) Romano Fenati	Kalex	6	Accident	9	
Ret	51	(Brazil) Eric Granado	Suter	2	Accident Damage	28	
Ret	10	(Italy) Luca Marini	Kalex	0	Accident	12	
OFFICIAL MOTO2 REPORT

=== Moto3 ===
Pos.	No.	Rider	Manufacturer	Laps	Time/Retired	Grid	Points
1	65	(Germany) Philipp Öttl	KTM	22	39:39.799	2	25
2	12	(Italy) Marco Bezzecchi	KTM	22	+0.059	5	20
3	42	(Spain) Marcos Ramírez	KTM	22	+3.733	17	16
4 (Note: 1-place penalty for exceeding track limits.)	72	(Spain) Alonso López	Honda	22	+3.515	6	13
5	5	(Spain) Jaume Masiá	KTM	22	+3.958	25	11
6	24	(Japan) Tatsuki Suzuki	Honda	22	+4.000	9	10
7	21	(Italy) Fabio Di Giannantonio	Honda	22	+4.033	3	9
8	84	(Czech Republic) Jakub Kornfeil	KTM	22	+4.161	15	8
9	27	(Japan) Kaito Toba	Honda	22	+4.171	10	7
10	19	(Argentina) Gabriel Rodrigo	KTM	22	+4.216	20	6
11	23	(Italy) Niccolò Antonelli	Honda	22	+4.176	4	5
12	71	(Japan) Ayumu Sasaki	Honda	22	+4.264	23	4
13	16	(Italy) Andrea Migno	KTM	22	+8.166	18 (Note: 12-place grid penalty.)	3
14	76	(Kazakhstan) Makar Yurchenko	KTM	22	+8.382	12	2
15	32	(Japan) Ai Ogura	Honda	22	+27.297	19	1
16	7	(Malaysia) Adam Norrodin	Honda	22	+27.346	29	
17	8	(Italy) Nicolò Bulega	KTM	22	+27.574	22	
18	11	(Belgium) Livio Loi	KTM	22	+27.599	26	
19	41	(Thailand) Nakarin Atiratphuvapat	Honda	22	+27.795	27	
20	22	(Japan) Kazuki Masaki	KTM	22	+37.042	13	
Ret	33	(Italy) Enea Bastianini	Honda	18	Collision	7	
Ret	14	(Italy) Tony Arbolino	Honda	18	Collision	21	
Ret	88	(Spain) Jorge Martín	Honda	18	Collision	1	
Ret	44	(Spain) Arón Canet	Honda	18	Collision	14	
Ret	75	(Spain) Albert Arenas	KTM	13	Rear Tyre	24	
Ret	48	(Italy) Lorenzo Dalla Porta	Honda	0	Collision Damage	8	
Ret	10	(Italy) Dennis Foggia	KTM	0	Collision	11	
Ret	17	(United Kingdom) John McPhee	KTM	0	Collision Damage	16	
Ret	52	(Spain) Jeremy Alcoba	Honda	0	Retired	28	
DNS	40	(South Africa) Darryn Binder	KTM		Did not start		
OFFICIAL MOTO3 REPORT

- Darryn Binder suffered a dislocated shoulder in a crash during qualifying and was declared unfit to start the race.

== Championship standings after the race ==
=== MotoGP ===
Pos.	Rider	Points
1	(Spain) Marc Márquez	70
2	(France) Johann Zarco	58
3	(Spain) Maverick Viñales	50
4	(Italy) Andrea Iannone	47
5	(Italy) Andrea Dovizioso	46
6	(Italy) Valentino Rossi	40
7	(United Kingdom) Cal Crutchlow	38
8	(Australia) Jack Miller	36
9	(Italy) Danilo Petrucci	34
10	(Spain) Tito Rabat	24

=== Moto2 ===
Pos.	Rider	Points
1	(Italy) Francesco Bagnaia	73
2	(Italy) Lorenzo Baldassarri	64
3	(Portugal) Miguel Oliveira	63
4	(Italy) Mattia Pasini	58
5	(Spain) Álex Márquez	47
6	(Spain) Xavi Vierge	41
7	(Spain) Joan Mir	32
8	(South Africa) Brad Binder	30
9	(Germany) Marcel Schrötter	24
10	(Spain) Iker Lecuona	23

=== Moto3 ===
Pos.	Rider	Points
1	(Italy) Marco Bezzecchi	63
2	(Spain) Jorge Martín	55
3	(Spain) Arón Canet	48
4	(Italy) Fabio Di Giannantonio	46
5	(Germany) Philipp Öttl	35
6	(Italy) Enea Bastianini	33
7	(Argentina) Gabriel Rodrigo	28
8	(Italy) Niccolò Antonelli	26
9	(Czech Republic) Jakub Kornfeil	26
10	(Italy) Lorenzo Dalla Porta	25

== Notes ==
Previous race: 2018 Grand Prix of the Americas	FIM Grand Prix World Championship; 2018 season	Next race: 2018 French Grand Prix
Previous race: 2017 Spanish Grand Prix	Spanish motorcycle Grand Prix	Next race: 2019 Spanish Grand Prix
