= 2022 Aragon motorcycle Grand Prix =

Fifteenth round of the 2022 Grand Prix motorcycle racing season

2022 Aragon Grand Prix
Race details
- Race 15 of 20 races in the 2022 Grand Prix motorcycle racing season
- Date: 18 September 2022
- Official name: Gran Premio Animoca Brands de Aragón
- Location: MotorLand Aragón; Alcañiz, Spain
- Course: Permanent racing facility; 5.077 km (3.155 mi)

MotoGP
Pole position
Rider	(Italy) Francesco Bagnaia	Ducati
Time	1:46.069	
Fastest lap
Rider	(Italy) Luca Marini	Ducati
Time	1:47.795 on lap 4	
Podium
First	(Italy) Enea Bastianini	Ducati
Second	(Italy) Francesco Bagnaia	Ducati
Third	(Spain) Aleix Espargaró	Aprilia

Moto2
Pole position
Rider	(Spain) Augusto Fernández	Kalex
Time	1:51.888	
Fastest lap
Rider	(Spain) Pedro Acosta	Kalex
Time	1:52.484 on lap 6	
Podium
First	(Spain) Pedro Acosta	Kalex
Second	(Spain) Arón Canet	Kalex
Third	(Spain) Augusto Fernández	Kalex

Moto3
Pole position
Rider	(Spain) Izan Guevara	Gas Gas
Time	1:57.868	
Fastest lap
Rider	(Turkey) Deniz Öncü	KTM
Time	1:57.896 on lap 4	
Podium
First	(Spain) Izan Guevara	Gas Gas
Second	(Japan) Ayumu Sasaki	Husqvarna
Third	(Spain) Daniel Holgado	KTM

The 2022 Aragon motorcycle Grand Prix (officially known as the Gran Premio Animoca Brands de Aragón) was the fifteenth round of the 2022 Grand Prix motorcycle racing season. It was held at the MotorLand Aragón in Alcañiz on 18 September 2022.

In the MotoGP class, Enea Bastianini's win helped Ducati secure its third consecutive and fourth overall Constructors' Championship.

== Background ==
=== Riders' entries ===
In the MotoGP class, Marc Márquez returns to the track with the Honda of the Repsol Honda Team, who had stopped after the Italian Grand Prix and had undergone a fourth surgery on his right humerus and was replaced by Stefan Bradl. Cal Crutchlow, Yamaha test rider, replaces Andrea Dovizioso in the WithU Yamaha RNF MotoGP Team starting from this race, which has decided to retire from his racing career. Joan Mir returned to Suzuki after missing the Misano race due to an ankle injury sustained in the Austrian Grand Prix and replaced by Kazuki Watanabe. In the Moto2 class, the Japanese Taiga Hada continues to replace Gabriel Rodrigo in the Pertamina Mandalika SAG Team, and the Australian Senna Agius continues to replace Sam Lowes in the Elf Marc VDS Racing Team. In the Moto3 class, in addition to the confirmation of Nicola Carraro as a replacement for Matteo Bertelle on the KTM of the QJmotor Avintia Racing Team, there are two wildcards to report: María Herrera (who raced in the 2022 MotoE World Cup) with the KTM of the Angeluss MTA Team: the Spaniard returns to racing in the category five years after the last race, the 2017 Valencian Community Grand Prix; the Italian Alessandro Morosi rides with the KTM of the MT Helmets - MSI team.

=== MotoGP Championship standings before the race ===
The fourth consecutive success obtained at Misano (the sixth of the season) allows Francesco Bagnaia to overtake Aleix Espargaró in second place in the riders' classification (181 vs. 178 points) and to further reduce the delay from the leader Fabio Quartararo (211 points). Fourth is Enea Bastianini with 138 points, who overtakes Johann Zarco (125 points) and Jack Miller (123 points). In the constructors' classification, Ducati leads widely with 321 points, 110 points ahead of Yamaha; followed by Aprilia (201 points), KTM (148 points), Suzuki (127 points) and Honda (96 points). In the team standings, Ducati Lenovo Team is first with 304 points, plus 25 on Aprilia Racing, plus 67 on Monster Energy Yamaha MotoGP, plus 85 on Prima Pramac Racing and plus 99 on Red Bull KTM Factory Racing.

=== Moto2 Championship standings before the race ===
Augusto Fernández returns to the top of the riders' standings with 198 points, overtaking Ai Ogura by four points. Arón Canet overtakes Celestino Vietti by one point in third place (157 vs 156 points); fifth is Tony Arbolino with 117 points. In the constructors' standings, Kalex, arithmetically champion (345 points), is no longer at full points thanks to the victory of Alonso López in the previous race with Boscoscuro (111 points), who returned to win four years after his last victory with Fabio Quartararo in the 2018 Italian Grand Prix, when it was called Speed Up. MV Agusta closes the standings, stopping at 5 points. In the team standings, Red Bull KTM Ajo overtakes Idemitsu Honda Team Asia in first place (296 vs 294 points). Third is Flexbox HP40 with 232 points, followed by GasGas Aspar Team and Elf Marc VDS Racing Team who have 173 and 168 points respectively.

=== Moto3 Championship standings before the race ===
Izan Guevara overtakes his teammate Sergio García at the top of the riders' standings: the first has 204 points, with an advantage of 11 points over the latter. Dennis Foggia, winner in Misano, confirms himself third at 35 points behind Guevara; Jaume Masià and Deniz Öncü are fourth and fifth with 147 and 140 points respectively. The constructors' classification reads: Gas Gas 262 points, Honda 251 points, KTM 230 points, Husqvarna 174 points, CFMoto 103 points. In the team classification, Gaviota GasGas Aspar Team leads widely with 397 points, plus 104 on Leopard Racing; third is Red Bull KTM Ajo with 214 points, followed by Sterilgarda Husqvarna Max with 185 points and Red Bull KTM Tech3 with 169 points.

== Free practice ==
=== MotoGP ===
==== Combinated Free Practice 1-2-3 ====
The top ten riders (written in bold) qualified in Q2.

Fastest session lap

Pos.	No.	Biker	Constructor	Free practice times		
Pos.	No.	Biker	Constructor	FP1	FP2	FP3
1	43	**(Australia) Jack Miller**	**Ducati**	1:49:322	1:47.800	**1:46.992**
2	63	**(Italy) Francesco Bagnaia**	**Ducati**	1:48.698	1:47.639	**1:47.022**
3	72	**(Italy) Marco Bezzecchi**	**Ducati**	1:49.349	1:48.475	**1:47.048**
4	23	**(Italy) Enea Bastianini**	**Ducati**	1:48.891	1:47.583	**1:47.057**
5	89	**(Spain) Jorge Martín**	**Ducati**	1:49.320	1:47.402	**1:47.082**
6	33	**(South Africa) Brad Binder**	**KTM**	1:49.642	1:47.912	**1:47.167**
7	88	**(Portugal) Miguel Oliveira**	**KTM**	1:49.005	1:48.042	**1:47.224**
8	20	**(France) Fabio Quartararo**	**Yamaha**	1:49.085	1:47.476	**1:47.258**
9	30	**(Japan) Takaaki Nakagami**	**Honda**	1:48.862	1:47.911	**1:47.266**
10	42	**(Spain) Álex Rins**	**Suzuki**	1:48.775	1:47.665	**1:47.272**
11	41	(Spain) Aleix Espargaró	Aprilia	1:48.686	1:47.951	**1:47.321**
12	93	(Spain) Marc Márquez	Honda	1:49.207	1:47.761	**1:47.429**
13	10	(Italy) Luca Marini	Ducati	1:49.170	1:47.893	**1:47.437**
14	49	(Italy) Fabio Di Giannantonio	Ducati	1:49.850	1:48.229	**1:47.455**
15	5	(France) Johann Zarco	Ducati	1:48.882	1:47.509	**1:47.478**
16	73	(Spain) Álex Márquez	Honda	1:49.490	1:48.521	**1:47.622**
17	12	(Spain) Maverick Viñales	Aprilia	1:49.357	**1:47.678**	1:47.786
18	87	(Australia) Remy Gardner	KTM	1:50.249	1:48.752	**1:47.718**
19	36	(Spain) Joan Mir	Suzuki	1:49.447	1:48.621	**1:47.763**
20	21	(Italy) Franco Morbidelli	Yamaha	1:49.088	1:48.002	**1:47.812**
21	35	(United Kingdom) Cal Crutchlow	Yamaha	1:49.392	1:48.531	**1:47.953**
22	44	(Spain) Pol Espargaró	Honda	1:49.515	1:48.743	**1:47.981**
23	40	(South Africa) Darryn Binder	Yamaha	1:50.370	1:48.618	**1:48.203**
24	25	(Spain) Raúl Fernández	KTM	1:50.312	1:48.688	**1:48.642**
OFFICIAL MOTOGP COMBINED FREE PRACTICE TIMES REPORT

== Qualifying ==
=== MotoGP ===
Fastest session lap

Pos.	No.	Biker	Constructor	Qualifying times		Final grid	Row
Pos.	No.	Biker	Constructor	Q1	Q2	Final grid	Row
1	63	(Italy) Francesco Bagnaia	Ducati	Qualified in Q2	1:46.069	1	1
2	43	(Australia) Jack Miller	Ducati	Qualified in Q2	1:46.159	2	1
3	23	(Italy) Enea Bastianini	Ducati	Qualified in Q2	1:46.313	3	1
4	41	(Spain) Aleix Espargaró	Aprilia	1:46.569	1:46.590	4	2
5	5	(France) Johann Zarco	Ducati	1:46.843	1:46.646	5	2
6	20	(France) Fabio Quartararo	Yamaha	Qualified in Q2	1:46.802	6	2
7	72	(Italy) Marco Bezzecchi	Ducati	Qualified in Q2	1:46.852	7	3
8	89	(Spain) Jorge Martín	Ducati	Qualified in Q2	1:46.911	8	3
9	42	(Spain) Álex Rins	Suzuki	Qualified in Q2	1:46.912	9	3
10	33	(South Africa) Brad Binder	KTM	Qualified in Q2	1:46.924	10	4
11	88	(Portugal) Miguel Oliveira	KTM	Qualified in Q2	1:47.183	11	4
12	30	(Japan) Takaaki Nakagami	Honda	Qualified in Q2	1:47.274	12	4
13	93	(Spain) Marc Márquez	Honda	1:46.909	N/A	13	5
14	10	(Italy) Luca Marini	Ducati	1:47.056	N/A	14	5
15	49	(Italy) Fabio Di Giannantonio	Ducati	1:47.119	N/A	15	5
16	12	(Spain) Maverick Viñales	Aprilia	1:47.337	N/A	16	6
17	73	(Spain) Álex Márquez	Honda	1:47.489	N/A	17	6
18	44	(Spain) Pol Espargaró	Honda	1:47.511	N/A	18	6
19	35	(United Kingdom) Cal Crutchlow	Yamaha	1:47.541	N/A	19	7
20	21	(Italy) Franco Morbidelli	Yamaha	1:47.651	N/A	20	7
21	25	(Spain) Raúl Fernández	KTM	1:47.671	N/A	21	7
22	87	(Australia) Remy Gardner	KTM	1:47.847	N/A	22	8
23	40	(South Africa) Darryn Binder	Yamaha	1:49.309	N/A	23	8
OFFICIAL MOTOGP QUALIFYING RESULTS							8

=== Moto2 ===
Fastest session lap

Pos.	No.	Biker	Constructor	Qualifying times		Final grid	Row
Pos.	No.	Biker	Constructor	Q1	Q2	Final grid	Row
1	37	(Spain) Augusto Fernández	Kalex	Qualified in Q2	1:51.888	1	1
2	75	(Spain) Albert Arenas	Kalex	Qualified in Q2	1:52.012	2	1
3	96	(United Kingdom) Jake Dixon	Kalex	Qualified in Q2	1:52.179	3	1
4	21	(Spain) Alonso López	Boscoscuro	Qualified in Q2	1:52.270	4	2
5	40	(Spain) Arón Canet	Kalex	Qualified in Q2	1:52.274	5	2
6	51	(Spain) Pedro Acosta	Kalex	Qualified in Q2	1:52.280	6	2
7	14	(Italy) Tony Arbolino	Kalex	Qualified in Q2	1:52.289	7	3
8	79	(Japan) Ai Ogura	Kalex	1:52.686	1:52.397	8	3
9	35	(Thailand) Somkiat Chantra	Kalex	Qualified in Q2	1:52.475	9	3
10	16	(United States) Joe Roberts	Kalex	Qualified in Q2	1:52.576	10	4
11	54	(Spain) Fermín Aldeguer	Boscoscuro	Qualified in Q2	1:52.807	11	4
12	12	(Czech Republic) Filip Salač	Kalex	Qualified in Q2	1:52.872	12	4
13	9	(Spain) Jorge Navarro	Kalex	Qualified in Q2	1:52.883	13	5
14	18	(Spain) Manuel González	Kalex	Qualified in Q2	1:52.967	14	5
15	6	(United States) Cameron Beaubier	Kalex	1:52.480	1:53.002	15	5
16	64	(Netherlands) Bo Bendsneyder	Kalex	Qualified in Q2	1:53.404	16	6
17	13	(Italy) Celestino Vietti	Kalex	1:52.804	1:53.481	17	6
18	61	(Italy) Alessandro Zaccone	Kalex	1:52.748	1:54.042	18	6
19	7	(Belgium) Barry Baltus	Kalex	1:52.834	N/A	19	7
20	19	(Italy) Lorenzo Dalla Porta	Kalex	1:52.887	N/A	20	7
21	8	(Australia) Senna Agius	Kalex	1:52.941	N/A	21	7
22	23	(Germany) Marcel Schrötter	Kalex	1:53.045	N/A	22	8
23	84	(Netherlands) Zonta van den Goorbergh	Kalex	1:53.243	N/A	23	8
24	24	(Italy) Simone Corsi	MV Agusta	1:53.364	N/A	24	8
25	28	(Italy) Niccolò Antonelli	Kalex	1:53.450	N/A	25	9
26	42	(Spain) Marcos Ramírez	MV Agusta	1:53.487	N/A	26	9
27	52	(Spain) Jeremy Alcoba	Kalex	1:53.500	N/A	27	9
28	29	(Japan) Taiga Hada	Kalex	1:53.954	N/A	28	10
29	81	(Thailand) Keminth Kubo	Kalex	1:53.959	N/A	29	10
30	4	(United States) Sean Dylan Kelly	Kalex	1:54.115	N/A	30	10
OFFICIAL MOTO2 QUALIFYING RESULTS

=== Moto3 ===
Fastest session lap

Pos.	No.	Biker	Constructor	Qualifying times		Final grid	Row
Pos.	No.	Biker	Constructor	Q1	Q2	Final grid	Row
1	28	(Spain) Izan Guevara	Gas Gas	Qualified in Q2	1:57.868	1	1
2	71	(Japan) Ayumu Sasaki	Husqvarna	Qualified in Q2	1:57.963	2	1
3	96	(Spain) Daniel Holgado	KTM	Qualified in Q2	1:58.037	3	1
4	24	(Japan) Tatsuki Suzuki	Honda	Qualified in Q2	1:58.271	4	2
5	17	(United Kingdom) John McPhee	Husqvarna	Qualified in Q2	1:58.296	5	2
6	7	(Italy) Dennis Foggia	Honda	Qualified in Q2	1:58.363	6	2
7	48	(Spain) Iván Ortolá	KTM	Qualified in Q2	1:58.404	7	3
8	5	(Spain) Jaume Masià	KTM	Qualified in Q2	1:58.407	8	3
9	82	(Italy) Stefano Nepa	KTM	Qualified in Q2	1:58.548	9	3
10	43	(Spain) Xavier Artigas	CFMoto	Qualified in Q2	1:58.675	10	4
11	99	(Spain) Carlos Tatay	CFMoto	1:58.297	1:58.756	11	4
12	11	(Spain) Sergio García	Gas Gas	Qualified in Q2	1:58.875	12	4
13	53	(Turkey) Deniz Öncü	KTM	Qualified in Q2	1:59.034	13	5
14	72	(Japan) Taiyo Furusato	Honda	1:59.017	1:59.195	14	5
15	31	(Spain) Adrián Fernández	KTM	Qualified in Q2	1:59.229	15	5
16	44	(Spain) David Muñoz	KTM	1:58.749	1:59.281	16	6
17	10	(Brazil) Diogo Moreira	KTM	Qualified in Q2	No time set	17	6
18	54	(Italy) Riccardo Rossi	Honda	1:58.872	No time set	18	6
19	16	(Italy) Andrea Migno	Honda	1:59.146	N/A	19	7
20	27	(Japan) Kaito Toba	KTM	1:59.221	N/A	20	7
21	6	(Japan) Ryusei Yamanaka	KTM	1:59.221	N/A	21	7
22	66	(Australia) Joel Kelso	KTM	1:59.369	N/A	22	8
23	19	(United Kingdom) Scott Ogden	Honda	1:59.415	N/A	23	8
24	20	(France) Lorenzo Fellon	Honda	1:59.468	N/A	24	8
25	64	(Indonesia) Mario Aji	Honda	2:00.091	N/A	25	9
26	70	(United Kingdom) Joshua Whatley	Honda	2:00.298	N/A	26	9
27	22	(Spain) Ana Carrasco	KTM	2:00.361	N/A	27	9
28	23	(Italy) Elia Bartolini	KTM	2:00.892	N/A	28	10
29	69	(Spain) María Herrera	KTM	2:01.456	N/A	29	10
30	9	(Italy) Nicola Carraro	KTM	2:01.938	N/A	30	10
31	91	(Italy) Alessandro Morosi	KTM	No time set	N/A	31	11
OFFICIAL MOTO3 QUALIFYING RESULTS

== Race ==
=== MotoGP ===
Pos.	No.	Biker	Team	Constructor	Laps	Time/Retired	Grid	Points
1	23	(Italy) Enea Bastianini	Gresini Racing MotoGP	Ducati	23	41:35.462	3	25
2	63	(Italy) Francesco Bagnaia	Ducati Lenovo Team	Ducati	23	+0.042	1	20
3	41	(Spain) Aleix Espargaró	Aprilia Racing	Aprilia	23	+6.139	4	16
4	33	(South Africa) Brad Binder	Red Bull KTM Factory Racing	KTM	23	+6.379	10	13
5	43	(Australia) Jack Miller	Ducati Lenovo Team	Ducati	23	+6.964	2	11
6	89	(Spain) Jorge Martín	Prima Pramac Racing	Ducati	23	+12.030	8	10
7	10	(Italy) Luca Marini	Mooney VR46 Racing Team	Ducati	23	+12.474	14	9
8	5	(France) Johann Zarco	Prima Pramac Racing	Ducati	23	+12.655	5	8
9	42	(Spain) Álex Rins	Team Suzuki Ecstar	Suzuki	23	+12.702	9	7
10	72	(Italy) Marco Bezzecchi	Mooney VR46 Racing Team	Ducati	23	+16.150	7	6
11	88	(Portugal) Miguel Oliveira	Red Bull KTM Factory Racing	KTM	23	+17.071	11	5
12	73	(Spain) Álex Márquez	LCR Honda Castrol	Honda	23	+18.463	17	4
13	12	(Spain) Maverick Viñales	Aprilia Racing	Aprilia	23	+18.730	16	3
14	35	(United Kingdom) Cal Crutchlow	WithU Yamaha RNF MotoGP Team	Yamaha	23	+20.090	19	2
15	44	(Spain) Pol Espargaró	Repsol Honda Team	Honda	23	+27.588	18	1
16	87	(Australia) Remy Gardner	Tech3 KTM Factory Racing	KTM	23	+28.805	22	
17	21	(Italy) Franco Morbidelli	Monster Energy Yamaha MotoGP	Yamaha	23	+30.422	20	
18	40	(South Africa) Darryn Binder	WithU Yamaha RNF MotoGP Team	Yamaha	23	+31.330	23	
19	49	(Italy) Fabio Di Giannantonio	Gresini Racing MotoGP	Ducati	23	+31.595	15	
20	25	(Spain) Raúl Fernández	Tech3 KTM Factory Racing	KTM	23	+36.160	21	
Ret	93	(Spain) Marc Márquez	Repsol Honda Team	Honda	1	Collision damage	13	
Ret	20	(France) Fabio Quartararo	Monster Energy Yamaha MotoGP	Yamaha	0	Collision	6	
Ret	30	(Japan) Takaaki Nakagami	LCR Honda Idemitsu	Honda	0	Collision	12	
DNS	36	(Spain) Joan Mir	Team Suzuki Ecstar	Suzuki		Did not start		
Fastest lap: (Italy) Luca Marini (Ducati) – 1:47.795 (lap 4)
OFFICIAL MOTOGP RACE REPORT

- Joan Mir withdrew from the event after FP3 due to effects of a broken ankle suffered at the Austrian Grand Prix.

=== Moto2 ===
Pos.	No.	Biker	Constructor	Laps	Time/Retired	Grid	Points
1	51	(Spain) Pedro Acosta	Kalex	21	39:35.337	6	25
2	40	(Spain) Arón Canet	Kalex	21	+2.612	5	20
3	37	(Spain) Augusto Fernández	Kalex	21	+3.799	1	16
4	79	(Japan) Ai Ogura	Kalex	21	+7.736	8	13
5	14	(Italy) Tony Arbolino	Kalex	21	+7.803	7	11
6	54	(Spain) Fermín Aldeguer	Boscoscuro	21	+8.620	11	10
7	35	(Thailand) Somkiat Chantra	Kalex	21	+14.893	9	9
8	9	(Spain) Jorge Navarro	Kalex	21	+20.014	13	8
9	16	(United States) Joe Roberts	Kalex	21	+26.758	15	7
10	13	(Italy) Celestino Vietti	Kalex	21	+31.360	17	6
11	6	(United States) Cameron Beaubier	Kalex	21	+31.501	15	5
12	19	(Italy) Lorenzo Dalla Porta	Kalex	21	+31.876	20	4
13	7	(Belgium) Barry Baltus	Kalex	21	+31.952	19	3
14	61	(Italy) Alessandro Zaccone	Kalex	21	+32.178	18	2
15	64	(Netherlands) Bo Bendsneyder	Kalex	21	+32.895	16	1
16	8	(Australia) Senna Agius	Kalex	21	+33.396	21	
17	12	(Czech Republic) Filip Salač	Kalex	21	+42.998	12	
18	42	(Spain) Marcos Ramírez	MV Agusta	21	+45.314	26	
19	24	(Italy) Simone Corsi	MV Agusta	21	+50.088	24	
20	28	(Italy) Niccolò Antonelli	Kalex	21	+53.382	25	
21	4	(United States) Sean Dylan Kelly	Kalex	21	+1:02.499	30	
Ret	96	(United Kingdom) Jake Dixon	Kalex	20	Accident	3	
Ret	81	(Thailand) Keminth Kubo	Kalex	16	Accident	29	
Ret	29	(Japan) Taiga Hada	Kalex	16	Accident	28	
Ret	84	(Netherlands) Zonta van den Goorbergh	Kalex	6	Accident	23	
Ret	75	(Spain) Albert Arenas	Kalex	1	Accident	2	
Ret	18	(Spain) Manuel González	Kalex	1	Accident	14	
Ret	52	(Spain) Jeremy Alcoba	Kalex	1	Accident	27	
Ret	21	(Spain) Alonso López	Boscoscuro	0	Accident	4	
Ret	23	(Germany) Marcel Schrötter	Kalex	0	Accident	22	
Fastest lap: (Spain) Pedro Acosta (Kalex) – 1:52.484 (lap 6)
OFFICIAL MOTO2 RACE REPORT

=== Moto3 ===
Pos.	No.	Biker	Constructor	Laps	Time/Retired	Grid	Points
1	28	(Spain) Izan Guevara	Gas Gas	19	37:29.944	1	25
2	71	(Japan) Ayumu Sasaki	Husqvarna	19	+0.957	2	20
3	96	(Spain) Daniel Holgado	KTM	19	+6.536	3	16
4	53	(Turkey) Deniz Öncü	KTM	19	+12.906	13	13
5	31	(Spain) Adrián Fernández	KTM	19	+16.695	15	11
6	48	(Spain) Iván Ortolá	KTM	19	+16.721	7	10
7	44	(Spain) David Muñoz	KTM	19	+16.855	16	9
8	5	(Spain) Jaume Masià	KTM	19	+16.961	8	8
9	99	(Spain) Carlos Tatay	CFMoto	19	+17.048	11	7
10	17	(United Kingdom) John McPhee	Husqvarna	19	+17.071	5	6
11	43	(Spain) Xavier Artigas	CFMoto	19	+17.136	10	5
12	24	(Japan) Tatsuki Suzuki	Honda	19	+17.167	4	4
13	11	(Spain) Sergio García	Gas Gas	19	+17.217	12	3
14	7	(Italy) Dennis Foggia	Honda	19	+18.083	6	2
15	10	(Brazil) Diogo Moreira	KTM	19	+23.442	17	1
16	54	(Italy) Riccardo Rossi	Honda	19	+25.637	18	
17	72	(Japan) Taiyo Furusato	Honda	19	+28.688	14	
18	16	(Italy) Andrea Migno	Honda	19	+31.435	19	
19	82	(Italy) Stefano Nepa	KTM	19	+31.525	9	
20	23	(Italy) Elia Bartolini	KTM	19	+31.592	28	
21	66	(Australia) Joel Kelso	KTM	19	+31.599	22	
22	19	(United Kingdom) Scott Ogden	Honda	19	+31.990	23	
23	27	(Japan) Kaito Toba	KTM	19	+34.415	20	
24	64	(Indonesia) Mario Aji	Honda	19	+34.747	25	
25	22	(Spain) Ana Carrasco	Honda	19	+1:00.627	27	
26	91	(Italy) Alessandro Morosi	KTM	19	+1:23.545	31	
27	69	(Spain) María Herrera	KTM	19	+1:23.608	29	
Ret	6	(Japan) Ryusei Yamanaka	KTM	12	Accident Damage	21	
Ret	9	(Italy) Nicola Carraro	KTM	1	Accident Damage	30	
Ret	20	(France) Lorenzo Fellon	Honda	1	Accident Damage	24	
Ret	70	(United Kingdom) Joshua Whatley	Honda	0	Accident	26	
DNS	67	(Italy) Alberto Surra	Honda		Did not start		
Fastest lap: (Turkey) Deniz Öncü (KTM) – 1:57.896 (lap 4)
OFFICIAL MOTO3 RACE REPORT

- Alberto Surra suffered a fractured right hand in a crash during Free Practice 3 and withdrew from the event.

== Championship standings after the race ==
Below are the standings for the top five riders, constructors, and teams after the round.

=== MotoGP ===
Riders' Championship standings

	Pos.	Rider	Points
	1	(France) Fabio Quartararo	211
	2	(Italy) Francesco Bagnaia	201
	3	(Spain) Aleix Espargaró	194
	4	(Italy) Enea Bastianini	163
1	5	(Australia) Jack Miller	134

Constructors' Championship standings

	Pos.	Constructor	Points
	1	(Italy) Ducati	346
1	2	(Italy) Aprilia	217
1	3	(Japan) Yamaha	213
	4	(Austria) KTM	161
	5	(Japan) Suzuki	134

Teams' Championship standings

Pos.	Team	Points
1	(Italy) Ducati Lenovo Team	335
2	(Italy) Aprilia Racing	298
3	(Japan) Monster Energy Yamaha MotoGP	237
4	(Italy) Prima Pramac Racing	237
5	(Austria) Red Bull KTM Factory Racing	223

=== Moto2 ===
Riders' Championship standings

Pos.	Rider	Points
1	(Spain) Augusto Fernández	214
2	(Japan) Ai Ogura	207
3	(Spain) Arón Canet	177
4	(Italy) Celestino Vietti	162
5	(Italy) Tony Arbolino	128

Constructors' Championship standings

Pos.	Constructor	Points
1	(Germany) Kalex	370
2	(Italy) Boscoscuro	121
3	(Italy) MV Agusta	5

Teams' Championship standings

	Pos.	Team	Points
	1	(Finland) Red Bull KTM Ajo	337
	2	(Japan) Idemitsu Honda Team Asia	316
	3	(Spain) Flexbox HP40	260
1	4	(Belgium) Elf Marc VDS Racing Team	179
1	5	(Spain) Shimoko GasGas Aspar Team	173

=== Moto3 ===
Riders' Championship standings

	Pos.	Rider	Points
	1	(Spain) Izan Guevara	229
	2	(Spain) Sergio García	196
	3	(Italy) Dennis Foggia	171
2	4	(Japan) Ayumu Sasaki	158
1	5	(Spain) Jaume Masià	155

Constructors' Championship standings

Pos.	Constructor	Points
1	(Spain) Gas Gas	287
2	(Japan) Honda	255
3	(Austria) KTM	246
4	(Sweden) Husqvarna	194
5	(China) CFMoto	110

Teams' Championship standings

Pos.	Team	Points
1	(Spain) AutoSolar GasGas Aspar Team	425
2	(Luxembourg) Leopard Racing	299
3	(Finland) Red Bull KTM Ajo	238
4	(Italy) Sterilgarda Husqvarna Max	211
5	(France) Red Bull KTM Tech3	193

Previous race: 2022 San Marino Grand Prix	FIM Grand Prix World Championship; 2022 season	Next race: 2022 Japanese Grand Prix
Previous race: 2021 Aragon Grand Prix	Aragon motorcycle Grand Prix	Next race: None
