= Quartararo =

Quartararo is a surname. Notable people with the surname include:

- Fabio Quartararo (born 1999), French motorcycle rider
- Phil Quartararo (1956-2023), American music industry executive
- Riccardo Quartararo (1443–1506), Italian painter of the Renaissance period

== See also ==
- Alex Quartararo, a fictional character in Battlestar Galactica
