= 2021 Aragon motorcycle Grand Prix =

Thirteenth round of the 2021 Grand Prix motorcycle racing season

2021 Aragon Grand Prix
Race details
- Race 13 of 18 races in the 2021 Grand Prix motorcycle racing season
- Date: 12 September 2021
- Official name: Gran Premio Tissot de Aragón
- Location: MotorLand Aragón; Alcañiz, Spain
- Course: Permanent racing facility; 5.077 km (3.155 mi)

MotoGP
Pole position
Rider	(Italy) Francesco Bagnaia	Ducati
Time	1:46.322	
Fastest lap
Rider	(Spain) Marc Márquez	Honda
Time	1:48.139 on lap 6	
Podium
First	(Italy) Francesco Bagnaia	Ducati
Second	(Spain) Marc Márquez	Honda
Third	(Spain) Joan Mir	Suzuki

Moto2
Pole position
Rider	(United Kingdom) Sam Lowes	Kalex
Time	1:51.778	
Fastest lap
Rider	(Spain) Raúl Fernández	Kalex
Time	1:52.206 on lap 2	
Podium
First	(Spain) Raúl Fernández	Kalex
Second	(Australia) Remy Gardner	Kalex
Third	(Spain) Augusto Fernández	Kalex

Moto3
Pole position
Rider	(South Africa) Darryn Binder	Honda
Time	1:57.724	
Fastest lap
Rider	(Spain) Izan Guevara	Gas Gas
Time	1:58.589 on lap 7	
Podium
First	(Italy) Dennis Foggia	Honda
Second	(Turkey) Deniz Öncü	KTM
Third	(Japan) Ayumu Sasaki	KTM

The 2021 Aragon motorcycle Grand Prix (officially known as the Gran Premio Tissot de Aragón) was the thirteenth round of the 2021 Grand Prix motorcycle racing season. It was held at the MotorLand Aragón in Alcañiz on 12 September 2021.

In the Moto2 class, Red Bull KTM Ajo won their second Teams' Championship.

== Qualifying ==
=== MotoGP ===
Fastest session lap

Pos.	No.	Biker	Constructor	Qualifying times		Final grid	Row
Pos.	No.	Biker	Constructor	Q1	Q2	Final grid	Row
1	63	(Italy) Francesco Bagnaia	Ducati	Qualified in Q2	1:46.322	1	1
2	43	(Australia) Jack Miller	Ducati	Qualified in Q2	1:46.688	2	1
3	20	(France) Fabio Quartararo	Yamaha	Qualified in Q2	1:46.719	3	1
4	93	(Spain) Marc Márquez	Honda	Qualified in Q2	1:46.736	4	2
5	89	(Spain) Jorge Martín	Ducati	Qualified in Q2	1:46.878	5	2
6	41	(Spain) Aleix Espargaró	Aprilia	Qualified in Q2	1:46.883	6	2
7	36	(Spain) Joan Mir	Suzuki	Qualified in Q2	1:47.162	7	3
8	44	(Spain) Pol Espargaró	Honda	Qualified in Q2	1:47.194	8	3
9	23	(Italy) Enea Bastianini	Ducati	Qualified in Q2	1:47.278	9	3
10	5	(France) Johann Zarco	Ducati	1:47.293	1:47.288	10	4
11	30	(Japan) Takaaki Nakagami	Honda	Qualified in Q2	1:47.366	11	4
12	33	(South Africa) Brad Binder	KTM	1:47.344	1:47.932	12	4
13	27	(Spain) Iker Lecuona	KTM	1:47.508	N/A	13	5
14	73	(Spain) Álex Márquez	Honda	1:47.542	N/A	14	5
15	35	(United Kingdom) Cal Crutchlow	Yamaha	1:47.613	N/A	15	5
16	9	(Italy) Danilo Petrucci	KTM	1:47.708	N/A	16	6
17	10	(Italy) Luca Marini	Ducati	1:47.741	N/A	17	6
18	88	(Portugal) Miguel Oliveira	KTM	1:47.750	N/A	18	6
19	12	(Spain) Maverick Viñales	Aprilia	1:47.764	N/A	19	7
20	42	(Spain) Álex Rins	Suzuki	1:47.790	N/A	20	7
21	46	(Italy) Valentino Rossi	Yamaha	1:47.863	N/A	21	7
22	96	(United Kingdom) Jake Dixon	Yamaha	1:48.146	N/A	22	8
OFFICIAL MOTOGP QUALIFYING RESULTS							8

== Race ==
=== MotoGP ===
Pos.	No.	Rider	Team	Manufacturer	Laps	Time/Retired	Grid	Points
1	63	(Italy) Francesco Bagnaia	Ducati Lenovo Team	Ducati	23	41:44.422	1	25
2	93	(Spain) Marc Márquez	Repsol Honda Team	Honda	23	+0.673	4	20
3	36	(Spain) Joan Mir	Team Suzuki Ecstar	Suzuki	23	+3.911	7	16
4	41	(Spain) Aleix Espargaró	Aprilia Racing Team Gresini	Aprilia	23	+9.269	6	13
5	43	(Australia) Jack Miller	Ducati Lenovo Team	Ducati	23	+11.928	2	11
6	23	(Italy) Enea Bastianini	Avintia Esponsorama	Ducati	23	+13.757	9	10
7	33	(South Africa) Brad Binder	Red Bull KTM Factory Racing	KTM	23	+14.064	12	9
8	20	(France) Fabio Quartararo	Monster Energy Yamaha MotoGP	Yamaha	23	+16.575	3	8
9	89	(Spain) Jorge Martín	Pramac Racing	Ducati	23	+16.615	5	7
10	30	(Japan) Takaaki Nakagami	LCR Honda Idemitsu	Honda	23	+16.904	11	6
11	27	(Spain) Iker Lecuona	Tech3 KTM Factory Racing	KTM	23	+17.124	13	5
12	42	(Spain) Álex Rins	Team Suzuki Ecstar	Suzuki	23	+17.710	20	4
13	44	(Spain) Pol Espargaró	Repsol Honda Team	Honda	23	+19.680	8	3
14	88	(Portugal) Miguel Oliveira	Red Bull KTM Factory Racing	KTM	23	+22.703	18	2
15	9	(Italy) Danilo Petrucci	Tech3 KTM Factory Racing	KTM	23	+25.723	16	1
16	35	(United Kingdom) Cal Crutchlow	Monster Energy Yamaha MotoGP	Yamaha	23	+26.413	15	
17	5	(France) Johann Zarco	Pramac Racing	Ducati	23	+26.620	10	
18	12	(Spain) Maverick Viñales	Aprilia Racing Team Gresini	Aprilia	23	+27.128	19	
19	46	(Italy) Valentino Rossi	Petronas Yamaha SRT	Yamaha	23	+32.517	21	
20	10	(Italy) Luca Marini	Sky VR46 Avintia	Ducati	23	+39.073	17	
Ret	96	(United Kingdom) Jake Dixon	Petronas Yamaha SRT	Yamaha	1	Accident	22	
Ret	73	(Spain) Álex Márquez	LCR Honda Castrol	Honda	0	Accident	14	
Fastest lap: (Spain) Marc Márquez (Honda) – 1:48.139 (lap 6)

=== Moto2 ===
Pos.	No.	Rider	Manufacturer	Laps	Time/Retired	Grid	Points
1	25	(Spain) Raúl Fernández	Kalex	21	39:49.990	3	25
2	87	(Australia) Remy Gardner	Kalex	21	+5.408	2	20
3	37	(Spain) Augusto Fernández	Kalex	21	+6.824	12	16
4	9	(Spain) Jorge Navarro	Boscoscuro	21	+7.051	7	13
5	44	(Spain) Arón Canet	Boscoscuro	21	+10.695	11	11
6	21	(Italy) Fabio Di Giannantonio	Kalex	21	+15.160	8	10
7	54	(Spain) Fermín Aldeguer	Boscoscuro	21	+16.730	17	9
8	79	(Japan) Ai Ogura	Kalex	21	+17.085	5	8
9	14	(Italy) Tony Arbolino	Kalex	21	+17.704	23	7
10	24	(Italy) Simone Corsi	MV Agusta	21	+20.121	20	6
11	23	(Germany) Marcel Schrötter	Kalex	21	+20.852 (Note: 3-second penalty for exceeding track limits.)	15	5
12	42	(Spain) Marcos Ramírez	Kalex	21	+24.602	10	4
13	16	(United States) Joe Roberts	Kalex	21	+26.086	18	3
14	6	(United States) Cameron Beaubier	Kalex	21	+29.101	19	2
15	13	(Italy) Celestino Vietti	Kalex	21	+30.301	26	1
16	70	(Belgium) Barry Baltus	NTS	21	+30.420	22	
17	81	(Spain) Manuel González	MV Agusta	21	+34.977	30	
18	62	(Italy) Stefano Manzi	Kalex	21	+35.789	24	
19	55	(Malaysia) Hafizh Syahrin	NTS	21	+36.036	25	
20	17	(United Kingdom) John McPhee	Kalex	21	+47.756	29	
21	18	(Andorra) Xavi Cardelús	Kalex	21	+47.834	31	
Ret	35	(Thailand) Somkiat Chantra	Kalex	17	Accident	27	
Ret	11	(Italy) Nicolò Bulega	Kalex	16	Electronics	14	
Ret	22	(United Kingdom) Sam Lowes	Kalex	13	Accident Damage	1	
Ret	64	(Netherlands) Bo Bendsneyder	Kalex	12	Dizziness	28	
Ret	72	(Italy) Marco Bezzecchi	Kalex	12	Accident Damage	9	
Ret	19	(Italy) Lorenzo Dalla Porta	Kalex	7	Accident	21	
Ret	75	(Spain) Albert Arenas	Boscoscuro	5	Accident	6	
Ret	40	(Spain) Héctor Garzó	Kalex	4	Accident	4	
Ret	97	(Spain) Xavi Vierge	Kalex	3	Accident	13	
Ret	12	(Switzerland) Thomas Lüthi	Kalex	3	Accident	16	
Ret	74	(Poland) Piotr Biesiekirski	Kalex	2	Accident	32	
OFFICIAL MOTO2 RACE REPORT

=== Moto3 ===
Pos.	No.	Rider	Manufacturer	Laps	Time/Retired	Grid	Points
1	7	(Italy) Dennis Foggia	Honda	19	37:53.710	14	25
2	53	(Turkey) Deniz Öncü	KTM	19	+0.041	6	20
3	71	(Japan) Ayumu Sasaki	KTM	19	+0.644	16	16
4	28	(Spain) Izan Guevara	Gas Gas	19	+0.708	13	13
5	23	(Italy) Niccolò Antonelli	KTM	19	+0.878	8	11
6	16	(Italy) Andrea Migno	Honda	19	+1.180	5	10
7	40	(South Africa) Darryn Binder	Honda	19	+2.133	1	9
8	82	(Italy) Stefano Nepa	KTM	19	+2.685	19	8
9	24	(Japan) Tatsuki Suzuki	Honda	19	+2.786	3	7
10	5	(Spain) Jaume Masiá	KTM	19	+4.714	15	6
11	6	(Japan) Ryusei Yamanaka	KTM	19	+8.275	27	5
12	31	(Spain) Adrián Fernández	Husqvarna	19	+9.499	22	4
13	63	(Malaysia) Syarifuddin Azman	Honda	19	+9.645	21	3
14	55	(Italy) Romano Fenati	Husqvarna	19	+14.797	17	2
15	54	(Italy) Riccardo Rossi	KTM	19	+18.880	23	1
16	27	(Japan) Kaito Toba	KTM	19	+18.894	18	
17	92	(Japan) Yuki Kunii	Honda	19	+19.272	25	
18	11	(Spain) Sergio García	Gas Gas	19	+19.888	4	
19	73	(Austria) Maximilian Kofler	KTM	19	+19.933	24	
20	19	(Indonesia) Andi Farid Izdihar	Honda	19	+38.640	26	
21	67	(Italy) Alberto Surra	Honda	19	+38.744	28	
Ret	52	(Spain) Jeremy Alcoba	Honda	18	Accident	7	
Ret	20	(France) Lorenzo Fellon	Honda	18	Accident	10	
Ret	43	(Spain) Xavier Artigas	Honda	15	Accident	12	
Ret	37	(Spain) Pedro Acosta	KTM	15	Accident	9	
Ret	99	(Spain) Carlos Tatay	KTM	12	Accident Damage	20	
Ret	2	(Argentina) Gabriel Rodrigo	Honda	5	Accident	2	
Ret	12	(Czech Republic) Filip Salač	KTM	2	Accident	11	
OFFICIAL MOTO3 RACE REPORT

== Championship standings after the race ==
Below are the standings for the top five riders, constructors, and teams after the round.

=== MotoGP ===
Riders' Championship standings

	Pos.	Rider	Points
	1	(France) Fabio Quartararo	214
2	2	(Italy) Francesco Bagnaia	161
1	3	(Spain) Joan Mir	157
1	4	(France) Johann Zarco	137
	5	(Australia) Jack Miller	129

Constructors' Championship standings

	Pos.	Constructor	Points
1	1	(Italy) Ducati	250
1	2	(Japan) Yamaha	242
1	3	(Japan) Suzuki	174
1	4	(Austria) KTM	171
	5	(Japan) Honda	135

Teams' Championship standings

	Pos.	Team	Points
	1	(Japan) Monster Energy Yamaha MotoGP	309
	2	(Italy) Ducati Lenovo Team	290
1	3	(Japan) Team Suzuki Ecstar	225
1	4	(Italy) Pramac Racing	212
	5	(Austria) Red Bull KTM Factory Racing	204

=== Moto2 ===
Riders' Championship standings

	Pos.	Rider	Points
	1	(Australia) Remy Gardner	251
	2	(Spain) Raúl Fernández	212
	3	(Italy) Marco Bezzecchi	179
	4	(United Kingdom) Sam Lowes	127
1	5	(Spain) Augusto Fernández	108

Constructors' Championship standings

Pos.	Constructor	Points
1	(Germany) Kalex	325
2	(Italy) Boscoscuro	138
3	(Italy) MV Agusta	16
4	(Japan) NTS	10

Teams' Championship standings

	Pos.	Team	Points
	1	(Finland) Red Bull KTM Ajo	463
1	2	(Belgium) Elf Marc VDS Racing Team	235
1	3	(Italy) Sky Racing Team VR46	226
	4	(Japan) Idemitsu Honda Team Asia	130
	5	(Spain) Kipin Energy Aspar Team	126

=== Moto3 ===
Riders' Championship standings

	Pos.	Rider	Points
	1	(Spain) Pedro Acosta	201
	2	(Spain) Sergio García	155
1	3	(Italy) Dennis Foggia	143
1	4	(Italy) Romano Fenati	134
	5	(Spain) Jaume Masiá	111

Constructors' Championship standings

Pos.	Constructor	Points
1	(Austria) KTM	275
2	(Japan) Honda	245
3	(Spain) Gas Gas	193
4	(Sweden) Husqvarna	140

Teams' Championship standings

	Pos.	Team	Points
	1	(Finland) Red Bull KTM Ajo	312
	2	(Spain) Gaviota GasGas Aspar Team	227
	3	(Luxembourg) Leopard Racing	173
2	4	(France) Red Bull KTM Tech3	160
	5	(Malaysia) Petronas Sprinta Racing	160

== Notes ==
Previous race: 2021 British Grand Prix	FIM Grand Prix World Championship; 2021 season	Next race: 2021 San Marino Grand Prix
Previous race: 2020 Aragon Grand Prix	Aragon motorcycle Grand Prix	Next race: 2022 Aragon Grand Prix
