= 2020 Moto3 World Championship =

9th running of the Moto3 World Championship

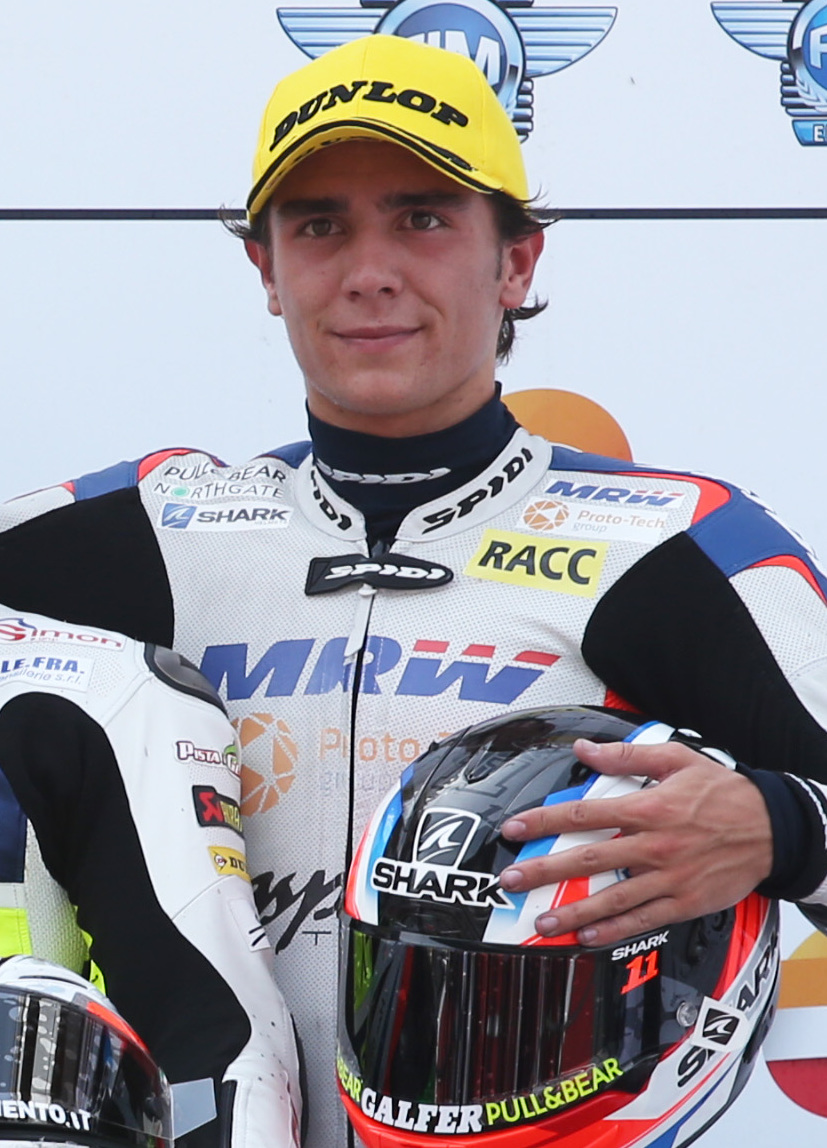
Albert Arenas (pictured in 2016) was the 2020 Moto3 World Riders' Champion.

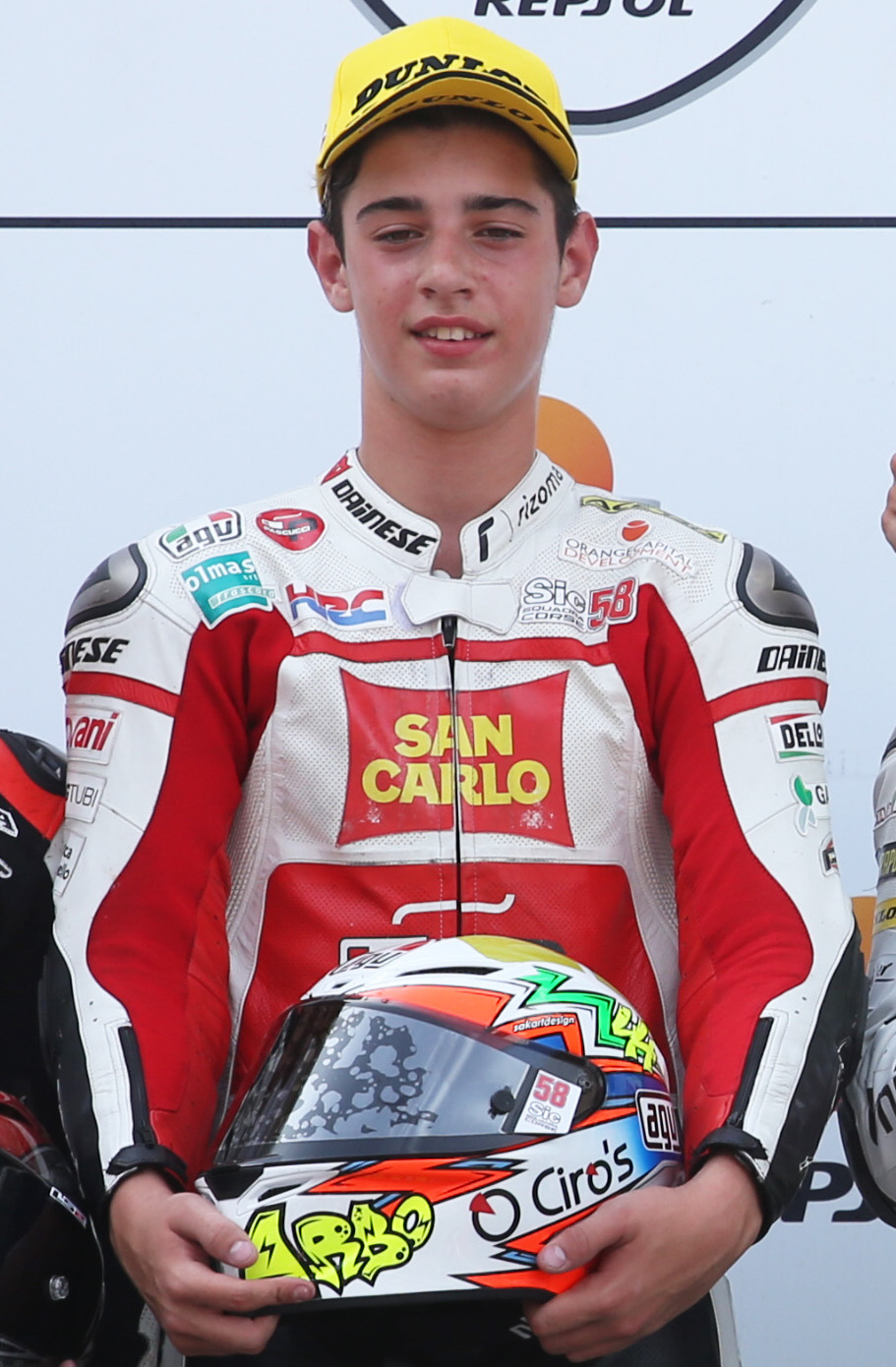
Tony Arbolino (pictured in 2016) finished runner-up.

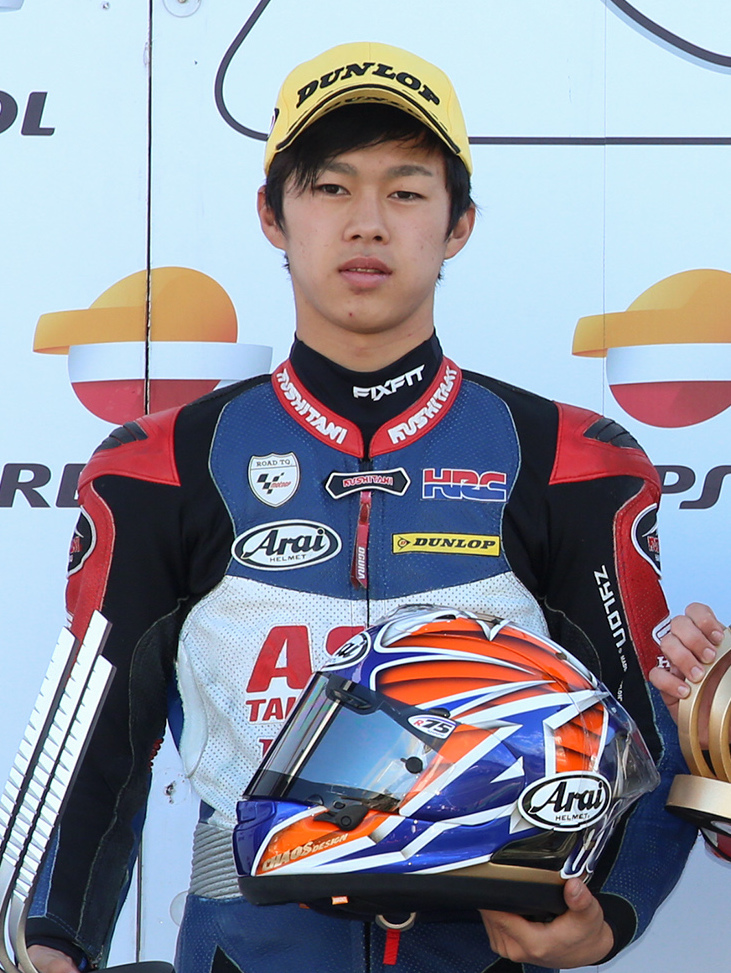
Ai Ogura (pictured in 2018) finished third.

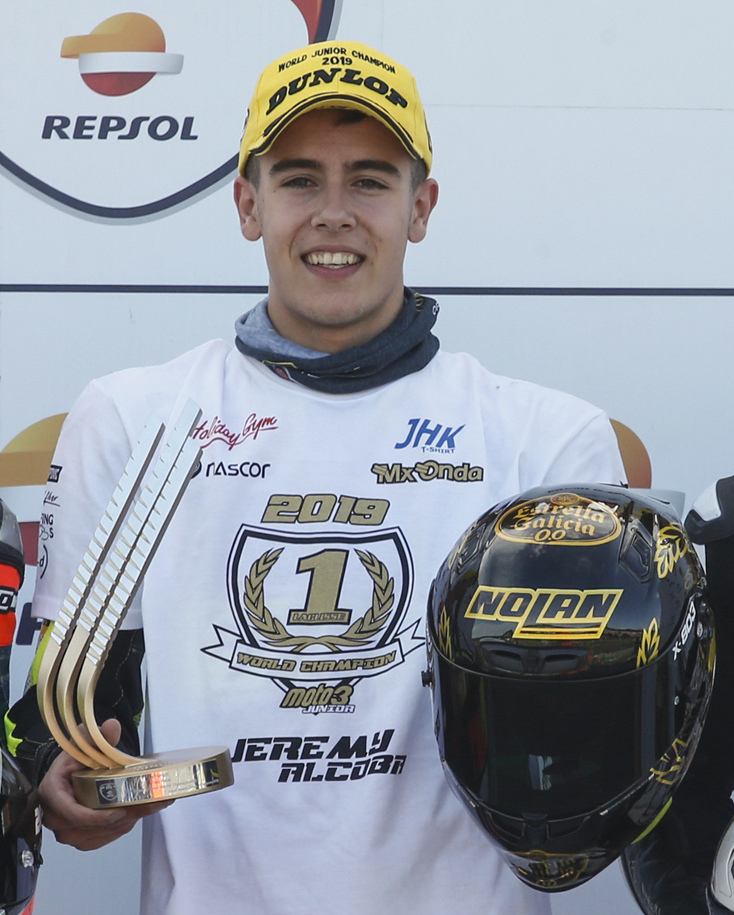
Jeremy Alcoba (pictured in 2019), the 2020 Moto3 Rookie of the Year.

The 2020 FIM Moto3 World Championship was the lightweight class of the 72nd Fédération Internationale de Motocyclisme (FIM) Road Racing World Championship season. The season calendar has been significantly affected by the COVID-19 pandemic, leading to the cancellation or postponement of many races.

Albert Arenas won the Riders' championship while riding a KTM RC250GP. Honda won its fourth straight Constructors' championship and its 20th overall in the Moto3 class. Leopard Racing won its second straight Teams' championship.

== Teams and riders ==
Team	Constructor	Motorcycle	No.	Rider	Rounds
(Spain) Estrella Galicia 0,0	Honda	NSF250RW	6	(Japan) Ryusei Yamanaka	All
(Spain) Estrella Galicia 0,0	Honda	NSF250RW	11	(Spain) Sergio García	All
(Japan) Honda Team Asia	Honda	NSF250RW	79	(Japan) Ai Ogura	All
(Japan) Honda Team Asia	Honda	NSF250RW	92	(Japan) Yuki Kunii	All
(Italy) Kömmerling Gresini Moto3	Honda	NSF250RW	2	(Argentina) Gabriel Rodrigo	All
(Italy) Kömmerling Gresini Moto3	Honda	NSF250RW	52	(Spain) Jeremy Alcoba	All
(Luxembourg) Leopard Racing	Honda	NSF250RW	5	(Spain) Jaume Masiá	All
(Luxembourg) Leopard Racing	Honda	NSF250RW	7	(Italy) Dennis Foggia	All
(Malaysia) Petronas Sprinta Racing	Honda	NSF250RW	17	(United Kingdom) John McPhee	All
(Malaysia) Petronas Sprinta Racing	Honda	NSF250RW	89	(Malaysia) Khairul Idham Pawi	1–5, 7–15
(Italy) Rivacold Snipers Team	Honda	NSF250RW	12	(Czech Republic) Filip Salač	1–14
(Italy) Rivacold Snipers Team	Honda	NSF250RW	31	(Spain) Adrián Fernández	15
(Italy) Rivacold Snipers Team	Honda	NSF250RW	14	(Italy) Tony Arbolino	1–10, 12–15
(Italy) Sic58 Squadra Corse	Honda	NSF250RW	23	(Italy) Niccolò Antonelli	2–15
(Italy) Sic58 Squadra Corse	Honda	NSF250RW	20	(Spain) José Julián García	1
(Italy) Sic58 Squadra Corse	Honda	NSF250RW	24	(Japan) Tatsuki Suzuki	1–8, 10–15
(Italy) Sic58 Squadra Corse	Honda	NSF250RW	20	(Spain) José Julián García	9
(Italy) Sterilgarda Max Racing Team	Husqvarna	FR250GP	21	(Spain) Alonso López	All
(Italy) Sterilgarda Max Racing Team	Husqvarna	FR250GP	55	(Italy) Romano Fenati	All
(Spain) Aspar Team Gaviota (Spain) Gaviota Aspar Team Moto3 (Spain) Solunion Aspar Team Moto3 (Spain) Valresa Aspar Team (Spain) Pull&Bear Aspar Team Moto3	KTM	RC250GP	75	(Spain) Albert Arenas	All
(Spain) Aspar Team Gaviota (Spain) Gaviota Aspar Team Moto3 (Spain) Solunion Aspar Team Moto3 (Spain) Valresa Aspar Team (Spain) Pull&Bear Aspar Team Moto3	KTM	RC250GP	82	(Italy) Stefano Nepa	All
(Spain) Boe Skull Rider Facile Energy	KTM	RC250GP	9	(Italy) Davide Pizzoli	All
(Spain) Boe Skull Rider Facile Energy	KTM	RC250GP	54	(Italy) Riccardo Rossi	1–11, 13–15
(Germany) CarXpert Prüstel GP	KTM	RC250GP	50	(Switzerland) Jason Dupasquier	All
(Germany) CarXpert Prüstel GP	KTM	RC250GP	70	(Belgium) Barry Baltus	2–15
(Germany) CarXpert Prüstel GP	KTM	RC250GP	60	(Germany) Dirk Geiger	1
(France) CIP Green Power	KTM	RC250GP	40	(South Africa) Darryn Binder	All
(France) CIP Green Power	KTM	RC250GP	73	(Austria) Maximilian Kofler	All
(Spain) Reale Avintia Racing (Spain) Reale Avintia Moto3	KTM	RC250GP	99	(Spain) Carlos Tatay	All
(Finland) Red Bull KTM Ajo	KTM	RC250GP	25	(Spain) Raúl Fernández	All
(Finland) Red Bull KTM Ajo	KTM	RC250GP	27	(Japan) Kaito Toba	All
(France) Red Bull KTM Tech3	KTM	RC250GP	53	(Turkey) Deniz Öncü	All
(France) Red Bull KTM Tech3	KTM	RC250GP	71	(Japan) Ayumu Sasaki	All
(Italy) Sky Racing Team VR46	KTM	RC250GP	13	(Italy) Celestino Vietti	All
(Italy) Sky Racing Team VR46	KTM	RC250GP	16	(Italy) Andrea Migno	All

Key
Regular rider
Replacement rider

All teams used series-specified Dunlop tyres.

=== Team changes ===
- Tech3 joined the Moto3 class after KTM's withdrawal from Moto2.
- Husqvarna returned to Moto3 after a 4-year absence with Sterilgarda Max Racing Team.
- Mugen Race shut down after 22 seasons.
- Sterilgarda Max Racing Team and Red Bull KTM Ajo both have expanded to two riders.
- Ángel Nieto Team reverted to their former name of Aspar.

=== Rider changes ===
- Leopard Racing have run 2 different riders from the previous season – Jaume Masiá, who joins from the WorldwideRace team, and Dennis Foggia, who joins from Sky Racing Team VR46. They replaced Lorenzo Dalla Porta and Marcos Ramírez, who've moved up to Moto2 with Italtrans Racing Team and American Racing respectively.
- Arón Canet moved up to Moto2 with Aspar Team. He was replaced at Sterilgarda Max Racing Team by Alonso López, who joined from Estrella Galicia 0,0.
- Filip Salač left Prüstel GP to join VNE Snipers, replacing Romano Fenati, who joined Sterilgarda Max Racing Team.
- Jakub Kornfeil was originally intended to leave Prüstel GP to join Boe Skull Rider Mugen Race. However, in January 2020, Kornfeil announced his retirement from professional racing. His seat was taken by Davide Pizzoli, who made his full season debut in Moto3.
- Jason Dupasquier and Barry Baltus made their debut with CarXpert Prüstel GP.
- Andrea Migno returned to Sky Racing Team VR46 after two seasons.
- Maximilian Kofler made his full season debut in Moto3, joining CIP Green Power. He became the first Austrian rider to compete as a regular rider since Michael Ranseder in the 2009 season.
- 2019 Red Bull MotoGP Rookies Cup winner Carlos Tatay made his full season debut with Reale Avintia Racing.
- Khairul Idham Pawi returned to Moto3 by joining Petronas Sprinta Racing. He replaced Ayumu Sasaki, who joined Red Bull KTM Tech3.
- Yuki Kunii signed for Honda Team Asia to replace Kaito Toba who joined Red Bull KTM Ajo.
- Raúl Fernández joined Red Bull KTM Ajo to replace Can Öncü who moved to the Supersport World Championship.
- Deniz Öncü made his full season debut with Red Bull KTM Tech3.
- Riccardo Rossi left Gresini Racing to join Boe Skull Rider Mugen Race, replacing Makar Yurchenko whose contract was terminated.

==== Mid-season changes ====
- Dirk Geiger replaced Barry Baltus for the first race due to age restriction.
- Tony Arbolino, despite testing negative for COVID-19, was forced to miss the Aragon Grand Prix as he had come into close contact with an infected passenger on his flight after the French Grand Prix and was required to self-isolate as a result. He was not replaced for that event and was back to racing at the Teruel Grand Prix.
- Adrián Fernández replaced Filip Salač for the Portuguese Grand Prix because of an injury.

== Calendar ==
The following Grands Prix are scheduled to take place in 2020:

Round	Date	Grand Prix	Circuit
1	8 March (Note: Night race)	QNB Grand Prix of Qatar	Lusail International Circuit, Lusail
2	19 July	(Spain) Gran Premio Red Bull de España	Circuito de Jerez, Jerez de la Frontera
3	26 July	(Andalusia) Gran Premio Red Bull de Andalucía	Circuito de Jerez, Jerez de la Frontera
4	9 August	(Czech Republic) Monster Energy Grand Prix České republiky	Brno Circuit, Brno
5	16 August	(Austria) myWorld Motorrad Grand Prix von Österreich	Red Bull Ring, Spielberg
6	23 August	BMW M Grand Prix of Styria	Red Bull Ring, Spielberg
7	13 September	Gran Premio Lenovo di San Marino e della Riviera di Rimini	Misano World Circuit, Misano Adriatico
8	20 September	(Emilia-Romagna) Gran Premio Tissot dell'Emilia Romagna e della Riviera di Rimini	Misano World Circuit, Misano Adriatico
9	27 September	(Catalonia) Gran Premi Monster Energy de Catalunya	Circuit de Barcelona-Catalunya, Montmeló
10	11 October	Shark Helmets Grand Prix de France	Bugatti Circuit, Le Mans
11	18 October	(Aragon) Gran Premio Michelin de Aragón	MotorLand Aragón, Alcañiz
12	25 October	(Province of Teruel) Gran Premio Liqui Moly de Teruel	MotorLand Aragón, Alcañiz
13	8 November	(Europe) Gran Premio de Europa	Circuit Ricardo Tormo, Valencia
14	15 November	(Valencian Community) Gran Premio Motul de la Comunitat Valenciana	Circuit Ricardo Tormo, Valencia
15	22 November	Grande Prémio MEO de Portugal	Algarve International Circuit, Portimão

=== Cancelled Grands Prix ===
The following rounds were included on the original calendar, but were cancelled in response to the COVID-19 pandemic:

Original Date	Grand Prix	Circuit
31 May	(Italy) Italian motorcycle Grand Prix	Mugello Circuit, Scarperia e San Piero
21 June	(Germany) German motorcycle Grand Prix	Sachsenring, Hohenstein-Ernstthal
28 June	(Netherlands) Dutch TT	TT Circuit Assen, Assen
12 July	(Finland) Finnish motorcycle Grand Prix	Kymi Ring, Iitti
30 August	(United Kingdom) British motorcycle Grand Prix	Silverstone Circuit, Silverstone
~~22 March~~; 4 October (Note: The Thailand Grand Prix was originally due to take place on 22 March but was initially rescheduled to 4 October due to the COVID-19 pandemic.)	Thailand motorcycle Grand Prix	Buriram International Circuit, Buriram
18 October	(Japan) Japanese motorcycle Grand Prix	Motegi Circuit, Motegi
25 October	(Australia) Australian motorcycle Grand Prix	Phillip Island Grand Prix Circuit, Phillip Island
1 November	(Malaysia) Malaysian motorcycle Grand Prix	Sepang International Circuit, Sepang
~~5 April~~; 15 November (Note: The Grand Prix of the Americas was originally due to take place on 5 April but was initially rescheduled to 15 November due to the COVID-19 pandemic.)	(United States) Motorcycle Grand Prix of the Americas	Circuit of the Americas, Austin
~~19 April~~; 22 November (Note: The Argentine Grand Prix was originally due to take place on 19 April but was initially rescheduled to 22 November due to the COVID-19 pandemic.)	(Argentina) Argentine Republic motorcycle Grand Prix	Autódromo Termas de Río Hondo, Termas de Río Hondo

=== Calendar changes ===
- The Thailand Grand Prix was moved from being the 15th round of 2019 to the 2nd round of 2020.
- The Argentine Republic Grand Prix and Grand Prix of the Americas swapped places in the calendar order.
- The German Grand Prix and Dutch TT also swapped places, with Germany moving to 21 June, while the Assen round remained in its traditional position on the final weekend of June.
- The Finnish Grand Prix was reintroduced to the calendar after a 38-year absence. The venue hosting the round will be the new Kymi Ring, instead of the Pyynikki Circuit used in 1962 and 1963 or the Imatra Circuit which hosted the round until 1982.
- The Aragon Grand Prix was moved from the last week of September to the first week of October. It was later returned to its original schedule to allow for the rescheduled Thailand Grand Prix.

=== Calendar changes as a reaction to COVID-19 pandemic ===
The season calendar has been significantly affected by the COVID-19 pandemic, leading to the cancellation or postponement of many races.

- The Qatar Grand Prix proceeded for Moto2 and Moto3 as planned despite cancellation of the premier class race, as the teams were already in Qatar for their final pre-season test before the quarantine measures were implemented.
- The Thailand Grand Prix was postponed on 2 March due to COVID-19 concerns. It was later planned to take place on 4 October, shifting the Aragon Grand Prix forward by a week.
- The Grand Prix of the Americas was postponed from 5 April to 15 November after the City of Austin implemented a state of emergency. The Valencian Grand Prix was subsequently shifted back by one week to 22 November to accommodate the Austin rescheduling.
- The Argentine Grand Prix was postponed to 22 November, further shifting the finale in Valencia to 29 November.
- The Spanish Grand Prix was postponed on 26 March.
- The French Grand Prix was postponed on 2 April.
- The Italian and Catalan Grands Prix were postponed on 7 April.
- The German Grand Prix was postponed on 17 April after the German government announced a ban of all large gatherings until at least 31 August.
- The Dutch TT was postponed on 23 April after the Dutch government announced a ban on all mass events until at least 1 September.
- The Finnish Grand Prix was postponed on 24 April.
- The German, Dutch, and Finnish rounds were officially cancelled on 29 April. For the first time in the championship's history, the Dutch TT was absent from the calendar.
- The British and Australian rounds were cancelled on 29 May.
- The Japanese round was cancelled on 1 June.
- The Italian round was officially cancelled on 10 June.
- On 11 June, a new schedule based in Europe was announced. The season is to contain 5 "double-headers" on consecutive weekends at Jerez, Austria, Misano, Aragon, and Valencia to achieve a minimum of 13 races.
- The European Grand Prix returned to the calendar for the first time since 1995, held at Circuit Ricardo Tormo as the first round of the Valencian double-header.
- The Grand Prix of the Americas was officially cancelled on 8 July.
- The Argentine, Thai, and Malaysian rounds were officially cancelled on 31 July.
- On 10 August, the Portuguese Grand Prix was announced to be staging the final race of the 2020 season at the Algarve International Circuit in Portimão. It will mark the first Portuguese Grand Prix since 2012 when it was held at the Circuito do Estoril. Portimão has been MotoGP's reserve track since 2017.

== Results and standings ==
=== Grands Prix ===
Round	Grand Prix	Pole position	Fastest lap	Winning rider	Winning team	Winning constructor	Report
1	Qatar motorcycle Grand Prix	(Japan) Tatsuki Suzuki	(Japan) Ai Ogura	(Spain) Albert Arenas	(Spain) Aspar Team Gaviota	(Austria) KTM	Report
2	(Spain) Spanish motorcycle Grand Prix	(Japan) Tatsuki Suzuki	(Spain) Sergio García	(Spain) Albert Arenas	(Spain) Gaviota Aspar Team Moto3	(Austria) KTM	Report
3	(Andalusia) Andalusian motorcycle Grand Prix	(Japan) Tatsuki Suzuki	(Spain) Jaume Masiá	(Japan) Tatsuki Suzuki	(Italy) Sic58 Squadra Corse	(Japan) Honda	Report
4	Czech Republic motorcycle Grand Prix	(Spain) Raúl Fernández	(Spain) Jaume Masiá	(Italy) Dennis Foggia	(Luxembourg) Leopard Racing	(Japan) Honda	Report
5	(Austria) Austrian motorcycle Grand Prix	(Spain) Raúl Fernández	(South Africa) Darryn Binder	(Spain) Albert Arenas	(Spain) Valresa Aspar Team	(Austria) KTM	Report
6	(Styria) Styrian motorcycle Grand Prix	(Argentina) Gabriel Rodrigo	(Japan) Ayumu Sasaki	(Italy) Celestino Vietti	(Italy) Sky Racing Team VR46	(Austria) KTM	Report
7	San Marino and Rimini Riviera motorcycle Grand Prix	(Japan) Ai Ogura	(Japan) Ryusei Yamanaka	(United Kingdom) John McPhee	(Malaysia) Petronas Sprinta Racing	(Japan) Honda	Report
8	(Emilia-Romagna) Emilia Romagna and Rimini Riviera motorcycle Grand Prix	(Spain) Raúl Fernández	(Argentina) Gabriel Rodrigo	(Italy) Romano Fenati	(Italy) Sterilgarda Max Racing Team	(Sweden) Husqvarna	Report
9	(Catalonia) Catalan motorcycle Grand Prix	(Italy) Tony Arbolino	(Italy) Romano Fenati	(South Africa) Darryn Binder	(France) CIP Green Power	(Austria) KTM	Report
10	(France) French motorcycle Grand Prix	(Spain) Jaume Masiá	(Italy) Celestino Vietti	(Italy) Celestino Vietti	(Italy) Sky Racing Team VR46	(Austria) KTM	Report
11	Aragon motorcycle Grand Prix	(Spain) Raúl Fernández	(South Africa) Darryn Binder	(Spain) Jaume Masiá	(Luxembourg) Leopard Racing	(Japan) Honda	Report
12	(Province of Teruel) Teruel motorcycle Grand Prix	(Spain) Raúl Fernández	(Spain) Sergio García	(Spain) Jaume Masiá	(Luxembourg) Leopard Racing	(Japan) Honda	Report
13	(Europe) European motorcycle Grand Prix	(United Kingdom) John McPhee	(Spain) Albert Arenas	(Spain) Raúl Fernández	(Finland) Red Bull KTM Ajo	(Austria) KTM	Report
14	Valencian Community motorcycle Grand Prix	(South Africa) Darryn Binder	(Spain) Sergio García	(Italy) Tony Arbolino	(Italy) Rivacold Snipers Team	(Japan) Honda	Report
15	(Portugal) Portuguese motorcycle Grand Prix	(Spain) Raúl Fernández	(Spain) Raúl Fernández	(Spain) Raúl Fernández	(Finland) Red Bull KTM Ajo	(Austria) KTM	Report

=== Riders' standings ===
Scoring system

Points were awarded to the top fifteen finishers. A rider had to finish the race to earn points.

Position	1st	2nd	3rd	4th	5th	6th	7th	8th	9th	10th	11th	12th	13th	14th	15th
Points	25	20	16	13	11	10	9	8	7	6	5	4	3	2	1

Pos.	Rider	Bike	Team	QAT (Qatar)	SPA (Spain)	ANC (Andalusia)	CZE (Czech Republic)	AUT (Austria)	STY (Styria)	RSM (San Marino)	EMI (Emilia-Romagna)	CAT (Catalonia)	FRA (France)	ARA (Aragon)	TER (Province of Teruel)	EUR (Europe)	VAL (Valencian Community)	POR (Portugal)	Pts
1	(Spain) Albert Arenas	KTM	Gaviota Aspar Team Moto3	1	1	Ret	2	1	5	Ret	4	Ret	3	7	4	DSQ^{F}	4	12	174
2	(Italy) Tony Arbolino	Honda	Rivacold Snipers Team	15	3	10	8	7	2	6	11	2^{P}	2		10	4	1	5	170
3	(Japan) Ai Ogura	Honda	Honda Team Asia	3^{F}	2	Ret	3	4	3	2^{P}	3	11	9	14	9	3	8	8	170
4	(Spain) Raúl Fernández	KTM	Red Bull KTM Ajo	10	6	6	6^{P}	9^{P}	8	Ret	6^{P}	13	7	3^{P}	12^{P}	1	3	1^{P F}	159
5	(Italy) Celestino Vietti	KTM	Sky Racing Team VR46	28	5	3	13	5	1	Ret	2	8	1^{F}	9	5	23	24	7	146
6	(Spain) Jaume Masiá	Honda	Leopard Racing	4	10	Ret^{F}	Ret^{F}	2	14	7	5	7	4^{P}	1	1	Ret	9	Ret	140
7	(United Kingdom) John McPhee	Honda	Petronas Sprinta Racing	2	Ret	2	5	3	Ret	1	10	Ret	Ret	5	6	Ret^{P}	11	9	131
8	(South Africa) Darryn Binder	KTM	CIP Green Power	Ret	18	4	12	6^{F}	6	Ret	Ret	1	Ret	2^{F}	8	5	5^{P}	6	122
9	(Spain) Sergio García	Honda	Estrella Galicia 0,0	11	17^{F}	8	16	16	10	25	17	4	11	19	Ret^{F}	2	2^{F}	4	90
10	(Italy) Dennis Foggia	Honda	Leopard Racing	9	Ret	Ret	1	21	11	9	Ret	3	13	10	16	Ret	16	2	89
11	(Spain) Jeremy Alcoba	Honda	Kömmerling Gresini Moto3	7	15	7	7	14	Ret	4	13	19	Ret	6	15	8	10	3	87
12	(Japan) Tatsuki Suzuki	Honda	Sic58 Squadra Corse	5^{P}	8^{P}	1^{P}	Ret	10	7	3	DNS		Ret	8	Ret	Ret	Ret	Ret	83
13	(Argentina) Gabriel Rodrigo	Honda	Kömmerling Gresini Moto3	6	7	5	19	11	4^{P}	5	12^{F}	10	8	Ret	14	15	Ret	27	80
14	(Italy) Romano Fenati	Husqvarna	Sterilgarda Max Racing Team	17	13	12	9	17	17	8	1	6^{F}	Ret	4	19	13	12	20	77
15	(Italy) Andrea Migno	KTM	Sky Racing Team VR46	16	4	22	14	12	13	10	8	Ret	5	Ret	18	12	7	21	60
16	(Japan) Ayumu Sasaki	KTM	Red Bull KTM Tech3	19	11	Ret	20	13	Ret^{F}	Ret	14	17	6	13	2	10	19	13	52
17	(Turkey) Deniz Öncü	KTM	Red Bull KTM Tech3	12	25	Ret	15	8	Ret	16	7	Ret	22	15	7	14	6	10	50
18	(Japan) Kaito Toba	KTM	Red Bull KTM Ajo	14	19	11	11	20	NC	17	9	18	Ret	11	3	Ret	Ret	15	41
19	(Italy) Niccolò Antonelli	Honda	Sic58 Squadra Corse		9	15	4	19	16	11	18	9	Ret	18	22	Ret	14	11	40
20	(Italy) Stefano Nepa	KTM	Gaviota Aspar Team Moto3	22	12	14	10	15	9	14	15	14	15	23	20	7	13	19	38
21	(Czech Republic) Filip Salač	Honda	Rivacold Snipers Team	8	Ret	Ret	25	Ret	12	20	16	12	12	16	13	9	DNS		30
22	(Spain) Carlos Tatay	KTM	Reale Avintia Moto3	21	Ret	13	18	22	21	15	19	Ret	10	12	17	6	21	14	26
23	(Spain) Alonso López	Husqvarna	Sterilgarda Max Racing Team	13	14	DNS	Ret	23	20	Ret	Ret	5	Ret	17	11	Ret	Ret	Ret	21
24	(Japan) Ryusei Yamanaka	Honda	Estrella Galicia 0,0	20	16	9	17	24	15	12^{F}	20	15	18	24	23	16	15	17	14
25	(Italy) Riccardo Rossi	KTM	Boe Skull Rider Facile Energy	24	Ret	21	Ret	18	Ret	13	21	20	14	21		11	23	24	10
26	(Belgium) Barry Baltus	KTM	CarXpert Prüstel GP		24	17	21	Ret	18	24	22	16	16	25	21	20	17	16	0
27	(Japan) Yuki Kunii	Honda	Honda Team Asia	18	Ret	16	Ret	26	22	23	25	21	20	20	25	17	18	22	0
28	(Switzerland) Jason Dupasquier	KTM	CarXpert Prüstel GP	25	21	19	23	28	19	19	23	22	17	22	24	18	22	23	0
29	(Italy) Davide Pizzoli	KTM	Boe Skull Rider Facile Energy	23	23	Ret	24	27	23	18	26	Ret	Ret	26	26	19	20	26	0
30	(Austria) Maximilian Kofler	KTM	CIP Green Power	27	20	18	Ret	25	24	22	27	23	21	Ret	28	21	Ret	25	0
31	(Spain) Adrián Fernández	Honda	Rivacold Snipers Team															18	0
32	(Malaysia) Khairul Idham Pawi	Honda	Petronas Sprinta Racing	26	22	20	22	DNS		21	24	24	19	27	27	22	Ret	28	0
33	(Germany) Dirk Geiger	KTM	CarXpert Prüstel GP	29															0
	(Spain) José Julián García	Honda	Sic58 Squadra Corse	Ret								Ret							0
Pos.	Rider	Bike	Team	QAT (Qatar)	SPA (Spain)	ANC (Andalusia)	CZE (Czech Republic)	AUT (Austria)	STY (Styria)	RSM (San Marino)	EMI (Emilia-Romagna)	CAT (Catalonia)	FRA (France)	ARA (Aragon)	TER (Province of Teruel)	EUR (Europe)	VAL (Valencian Community)	POR (Portugal)	Pts

Race key
Colour	Result
Gold	Winner
Silver	2nd place
Bronze	3rd place
Green	Points finish
Blue	Non-points finish
Blue	Non-classified finish (NC)
Purple	Retired (Ret)
Red	Did not qualify (DNQ)
Black	Disqualified (DSQ)
White	Did not start (DNS)
White	Withdrew (WD)
White	Race cancelled (C)
Blank	Did not practice (DNP)
Blank	Excluded (EX)
Blank	Did not arrive (DNA)
Blank	Did not enter (empty cell)
Annotation	Meaning
P	Pole position
F	Fastest lap
Rider key
Colour	Meaning
Light blue	Rookie rider

=== Constructors' standings ===
Each constructor received the same number of points as their best placed rider in each race.

Pos.	Constructor	QAT (Qatar)	SPA (Spain)	ANC (Andalusia)	CZE (Czech Republic)	AUT (Austria)	STY (Styria)	RSM (San Marino)	EMI (Emilia-Romagna)	CAT (Catalonia)	FRA (France)	ARA (Aragon)	TER (Province of Teruel)	EUR (Europe)	VAL (Valencian Community)	POR (Portugal)	Pts
1	(Japan) Honda	2	2	1	1	2	2	1	3	2	2	1	1	2	1	2	326
2	(Austria) KTM	1	1	3	2	1	1	10	2	1	1	2	2	1	3	1	318
3	(Sweden) Husqvarna	13	13	12	9	17	17	8	1	5	Ret	4	11	13	12	20	86
Pos.	Constructor	QAT (Qatar)	SPA (Spain)	ANC (Andalusia)	CZE (Czech Republic)	AUT (Austria)	STY (Styria)	RSM (San Marino)	EMI (Emilia-Romagna)	CAT (Catalonia)	FRA (France)	ARA (Aragon)	TER (Province of Teruel)	EUR (Europe)	VAL (Valencian Community)	POR (Portugal)	Pts

=== Teams' standings ===
The teams' standings were based on results obtained by regular and substitute riders.

Pos.	Team	Bike No.	QAT (Qatar)	SPA (Spain)	ANC (Andalusia)	CZE (Czech Republic)	AUT (Austria)	STY (Styria)	RSM (San Marino)	EMI (Emilia-Romagna)	CAT (Catalonia)	FRA (France)	ARA (Aragon)	TER (Province of Teruel)	EUR (Europe)	VAL (Valencian Community)	POR (Portugal)	Pts
1	(Luxembourg) Leopard Racing	5	4	10	Ret^{F}	Ret^{F}	2	14	7	5	7	4^{P}	1	1	Ret	9	Ret	229
1	(Luxembourg) Leopard Racing	7	9	Ret	Ret	1	21	11	9	Ret	3	13	10	16	Ret	16	2	229
2	(Spain) Gaviota Aspar Team Moto3	75	1	1	Ret	2	1	5	Ret	4	Ret	3	7	4	DSQ^{F}	4	12	212
2	(Spain) Gaviota Aspar Team Moto3	82	22	12	14	10	15	9	14	15	14	15	23	20	7	13	19	212
3	(Italy) Sky Racing Team VR46	13	28	5	3	13	5	1	Ret	2	8	1^{F}	9	5	23	24	7	206
3	(Italy) Sky Racing Team VR46	16	16	4	22	14	12	13	10	8	Ret	5	Ret	18	12	7	21	206
4	(Finland) Red Bull KTM Ajo	25	10	6	6	6^{P}	9^{P}	8	Ret	6^{P}	13	7	3^{P}	12^{P}	1	3	1^{P F}	200
4	(Finland) Red Bull KTM Ajo	27	14	19	11	11	20	NC	17	9	18	Ret	11	3	Ret	Ret	15	200
5	(Italy) Rivacold Snipers Team	12	8	Ret	Ret	25	Ret	12	20	16	12	12	16	13	9	DNS		200
5	(Italy) Rivacold Snipers Team	14	15	3	10	8	7	2	6	11	2^{P}	2		10	4	1	5	200
5	(Italy) Rivacold Snipers Team	31															18	200
6	(Japan) Honda Team Asia	79	3^{F}	2	Ret	3	4	3	2^{P}	3	11	9	14	9	3	8	8	170
6	(Japan) Honda Team Asia	92	18	Ret	16	Ret	26	22	23	25	21	20	20	25	17	18	22	170
7	(Italy) Kömmerling Gresini Moto3	2	6	7	5	19	11	4^{P}	5	12^{F}	10	8	Ret	14	15	Ret	27	167
7	(Italy) Kömmerling Gresini Moto3	52	7	15	7	7	14	Ret	4	13	19	Ret	6	15	8	10	3	167
8	(Malaysia) Petronas Sprinta Racing	17	2	Ret	2	5	3	Ret	1	10	Ret	Ret	5	6	Ret^{P}	11	9	131
8	(Malaysia) Petronas Sprinta Racing	89	26	22	20	22	DNS		21	24	24	19	27	27	22	Ret	28	131
9	(Italy) Sic58 Squadra Corse	20	Ret								Ret							123
9	(Italy) Sic58 Squadra Corse	23		9	15	4	19	16	11	18	9	Ret	18	22	Ret	14	11	123
9	(Italy) Sic58 Squadra Corse	24	5^{P}	8^{P}	1^{P}	Ret	10	7	3	DNS		Ret	8	Ret	Ret	Ret	Ret	123
10	(France) CIP Green Power	40	Ret	18	4	12	6^{F}	6	Ret	Ret	1	Ret	2^{F}	8	5	5^{P}	6	122
10	(France) CIP Green Power	73	27	20	18	Ret	25	24	22	27	23	21	Ret	28	21	Ret	25	122
11	(Spain) Estrella Galicia 0,0	6	20	16	9	17	24	15	12^{F}	20	15	18	24	23	16	15	17	104
11	(Spain) Estrella Galicia 0,0	11	11	17^{F}	8	16	16	10	25	17	4	11	19	Ret^{F}	2	2^{F}	4	104
12	(France) Red Bull KTM Tech3	53	12	25	Ret	15	8	Ret	16	7	Ret	22	15	7	14	6	10	102
12	(France) Red Bull KTM Tech3	71	19	11	Ret	20	13	Ret^{F}	Ret	14	17	6	13	2	10	19	13	102
13	(Italy) Sterilgarda Max Racing Team	21	13	14	DNS	Ret	23	20	Ret	Ret	5	Ret	17	11	Ret	Ret	Ret	98
13	(Italy) Sterilgarda Max Racing Team	55	17	13	12	9	17	17	8	1	6^{F}	Ret	4	19	13	12	20	98
14	(Spain) Reale Avintia Moto3	99	21	Ret	13	18	22	21	15	19	Ret	10	12	17	6	21	14	26
15	(Spain) Boe Skull Rider Facile Energy	9	23	23	Ret	24	27	23	18	26	Ret	Ret	26	26	19	20	26	10
15	(Spain) Boe Skull Rider Facile Energy	54	24	Ret	21	Ret	18	Ret	13	21	20	14	21		11	23	24	10
	(Germany) CarXpert Prüstel GP	50	25	21	19	23	28	19	19	23	22	17	22	24	18	22	23	0
	(Germany) CarXpert Prüstel GP	60	29															0
	(Germany) CarXpert Prüstel GP	70		24	17	21	Ret	18	24	22	16	16	25	21	20	17	16	0
Pos.	Team	Bike No.	QAT (Qatar)	SPA (Spain)	ANC (Andalusia)	CZE (Czech Republic)	AUT (Austria)	STY (Styria)	RSM (San Marino)	EMI (Emilia-Romagna)	CAT (Catalonia)	FRA (France)	ARA (Aragon)	TER (Province of Teruel)	EUR (Europe)	VAL (Valencian Community)	POR (Portugal)	Pts
