= 2021 MotoGP World Championship =

73rd running of the MotoGP World Championship

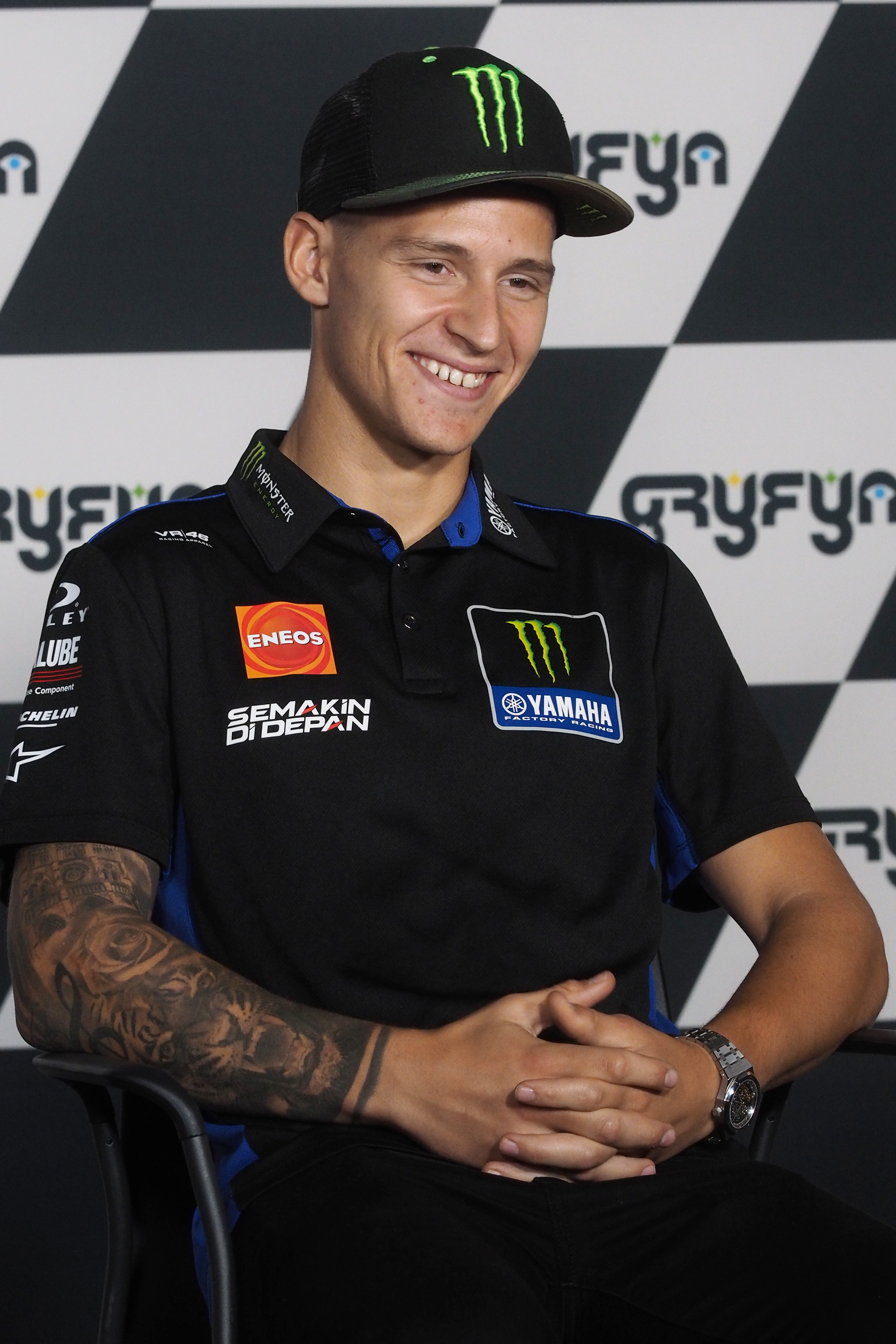
Fabio Quartararo (pictured in 2022) was the 2021 MotoGP World Riders' Champion.

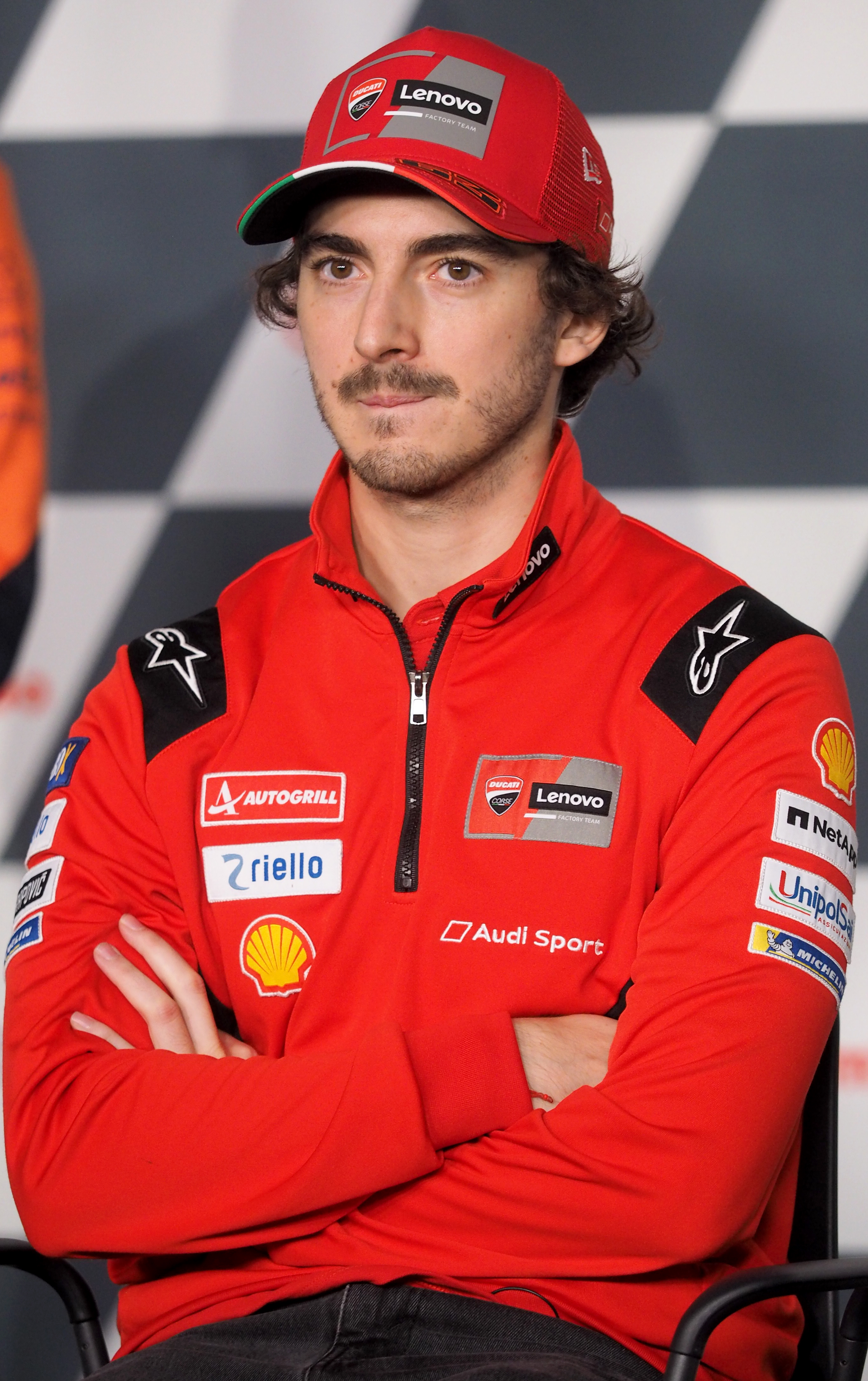
Francesco Bagnaia finished runner-up.

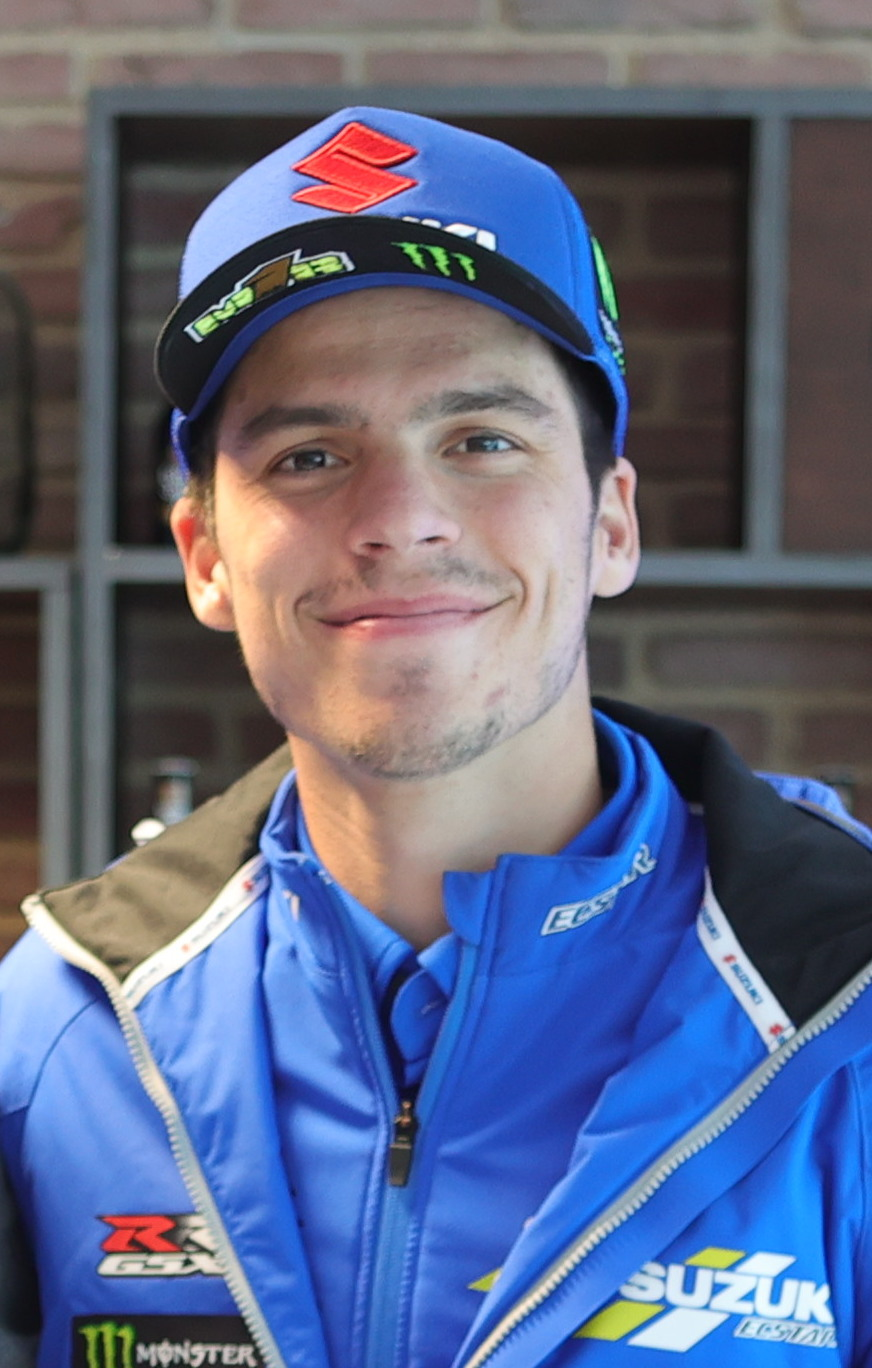
Defending champion Joan Mir finished third.

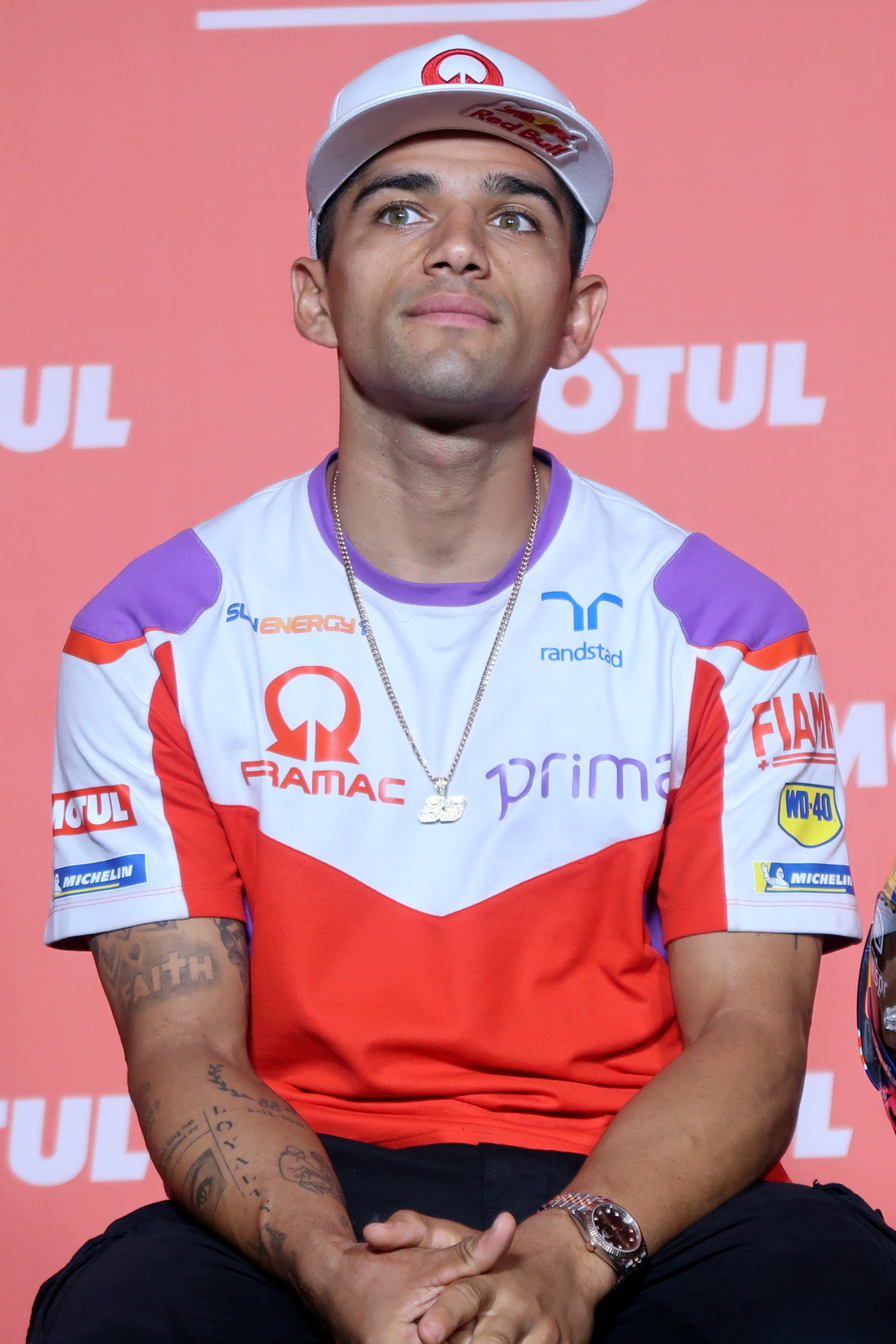
Jorge Martín (pictured in 2023), the 2021 MotoGP Rookie of the Year.

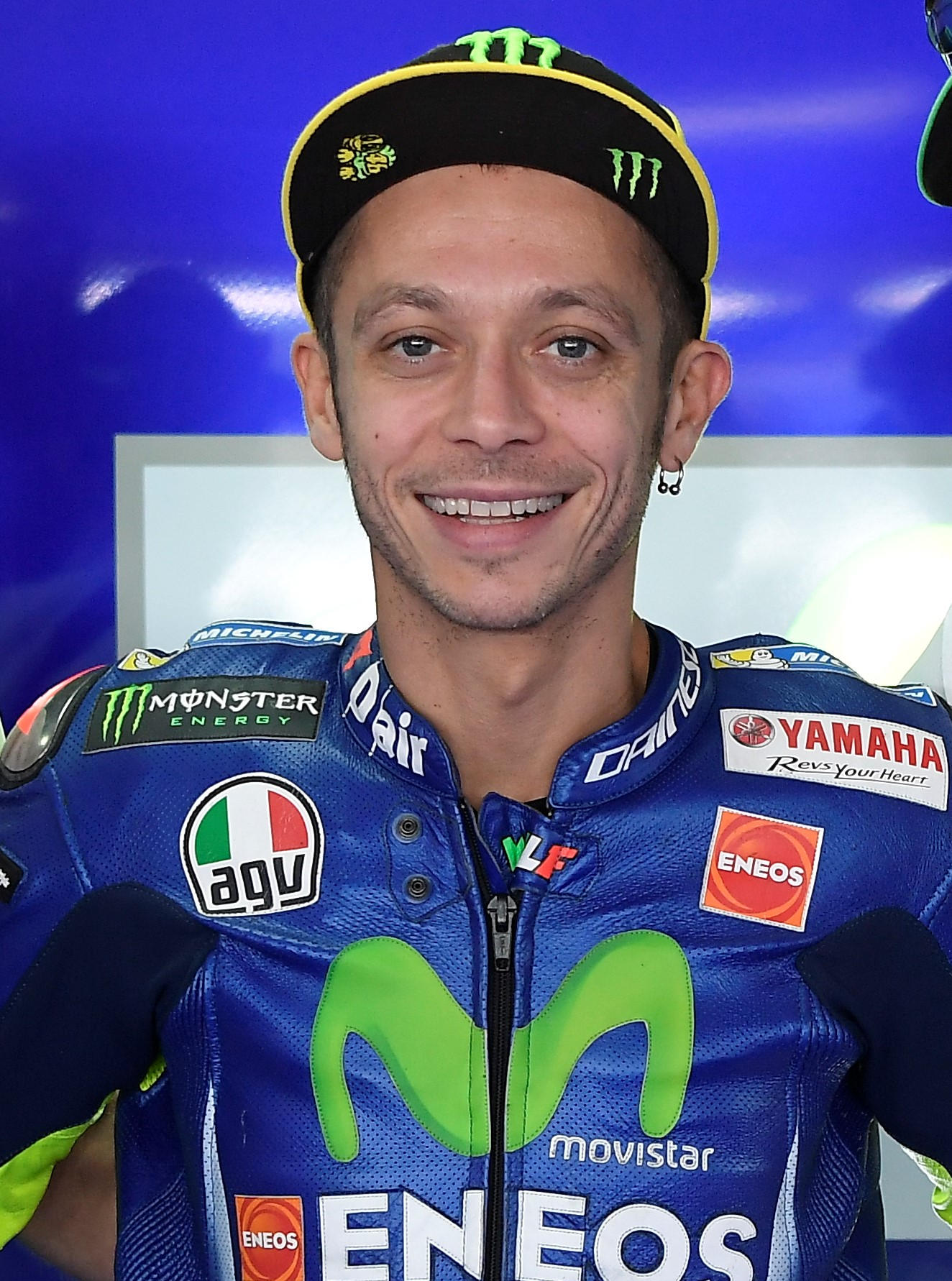
Valentino Rossi (pictured in 2017) retired at the end of the season after a 26-year career.

The 2021 FIM MotoGP World Championship was the premier class of the 73rd Fédération Internationale de Motocyclisme (FIM) Road Racing World Championship season, the highest level of competition in motorcycle road racing. Fabio Quartararo won his first world title, with five race wins ahead of securing the title in the third last race of the season. Quartararo became the first ever Frenchman to win the premier class title, which was also the first title for a non-Spanish rider since Australian Casey Stoner in 2011. The season also saw Francesco Bagnaia and Jorge Martín win their first premier class races. In the overall standings, Bagnaia secured second place and reigning champion Joan Mir secured third place, while Martín was named rookie of the year. Ducati secured the constructors' championship for the second consecutive season and the teams' championship for the first time since 2007. In total, eight different riders won Grands Prix during the season.

Six-time MotoGP champion Marc Márquez returned at the third race of the year after his arm and shoulder injury which had sidelined him from the 2020 season. Having initially struggled with the injury, the former champion won three races from summer onwards. It was also the final season of seven-time MotoGP title winner Valentino Rossi after 22 seasons in the premier class, as well as the final season in which a 500cc-era debutant participated in the premier class.

== Season summary ==
Joan Mir and Team Suzuki Ecstar began the season as defending riders' and teams' champions, respectively, while Ducati started as defending constructors' champion. Ducati and Yamaha became early season favourites after winning all of the first five races of the season (rounds 1-3 for Yamaha riders Maverick Viñales and Fabio Quartararo, rounds 4-5 for Ducati rider Jack Miller) and locking out all but one of the 15 podium positions between them. Perennial title favourite Marc Márquez made his return to the series at the third round in Portugal, after missing nearly the entirety of the 2020 season as well as the first two rounds in Qatar due to recovering from an injury.

By the sixth round in Italy, Quartararo became the first clear title favourite of the season after four consecutive pole positions and achieving his third win of the season, extending his championship lead to 24 points. Miguel Oliveira won the Catalan round during a three-race podium streak. At the German Grand Prix, Marc Márquez made his first return to the podium since the 2019 Valencian Grand Prix with a win, extending his unbroken streak of victories at the Sachsenring to 11 in a row, dating back to 2010 in the 125cc class. With his victory, Márquez ended Honda's longest win drought since their full-time return to the pinnacle of Grand Prix racing in 1982 at 581 days. At the Dutch TT, Quartararo claimed his fourth win of the season, extending his lead in the riders' championship heading into the summer break, with a 34-point-advantage over his nearest rival and compatriot Johann Zarco.

Returning from the summer pause in Styria, rookie Jorge Martín translated his second career pole position into his maiden race win in just his sixth MotoGP race start, and claimed the first victory for Pramac Racing since their entry to the class in 2002. During the pre-event press conference, Valentino Rossi announced his retirement after 26 years on the Grand Prix circuit, effective at the end of the season. At the Austrian Grand Prix, KTM rider Brad Binder took his second career victory in a flag-to-flag race in the rain, after electing to stay out on slicks with three laps remaining, while the other five riders of the lead group entered the pits to switch to wet tyres. At an unseasonably cold British round, Quartararo took a dominant win while his nearest rivals faltered, extending his championship lead to 65 points with six rounds remaining. Silverstone also marked the first career MotoGP podium finish for Aleix Espargaró and the first podium for Aprilia as a manufacturer in the modern MotoGP era.

In Aragon, Ducati factory rider Francesco Bagnaia led from pole position to take his first MotoGP victory and shortened Quartararo's championship advantage as the Frenchman struggled with tyres, dropping from third on the grid to finish eighth. At Misano, Bagnaia repeated his feat to win from pole for the second consecutive race, cutting the Frenchman's lead to just 48 points with four rounds remaining. In Austin, Marc Marquéz topped the podium for the second time of the year, ahead of chief title contenders Quartararo and pole-sitter Bagnaia. With the win, Marquéz extended his dominance over the Circuit of the Americas, having won 7 of 8 total MotoGP visits to the track.

At the Emilia-Romagna Grand Prix, Bagnaia started from pole for the fourth consecutive race, while Quartararo started from 15th position after a difficult qualifying session. While Quartararo fought his way back into the top five, Bagnaia crashed from the lead with four laps remaining, gifting Marquéz his third win of the season. Ultimately finishing the race in fourth after a last-lap pass by Enea Bastianini, Quartararo was crowned the 2021 MotoGP World Champion. Quartararo became the first ever Frenchman to win the premier class title, as well the first non-Spanish champion for a decade, since Australian Casey Stoner in 2011.

With Márquez missing the Algarve Grand Prix from a concussion sustained in a training incident, his winning streak ended. Bagnaia led from pole position to claim his third win of the season. After Quartararo crashed out of sixth position, Ducati secured the constructors' title. The race ended with a red flag after a collision between Iker Lecuona and Miguel Oliveira. Bagnaia achieved his fourth victory of the season at the Valencian finale ahead of Martín and Miller in Ducati's first-ever podium lock-out, securing the team's championship for the Ducati factory team for the first time since 2007.

In total, eight different riders won Grands Prix during the season, and 15 different riders made it onto the podium.

=== COVID-19 pandemic ===
As with the previous season, the 2021 championship was affected by the COVID-19 pandemic, leading to the cancellation or postponement of many races. As it became clear local pandemic conditions would not allow for a running of the Argentine or American Grands Prix as planned, both races were postponed and replaced with a second round in Qatar and a round in Portugal. The return of the Finnish Grand Prix was delayed by a further year, as Finnish race officials did not wish to hold their inaugural event without fans in the grandstands, and the race was replaced with a second round in Austria. The Japanese Grand Prix was cancelled due to the ongoing pandemic situation in the country and the resulting travel complications and logistical restrictions, and was replaced by the new date for the American Grand Prix. The Australian Grand Prix was cancelled in early July, due to the paddock's inability to meet the Australian government's requirement for a two-week quarantine for all foreign entries to the country, which would introduce too large of a disturbance to the MotoGP schedule. With a mid-summer resurgence of COVID-19 cases in Thailand, its Grand Prix, planned for mid-October, was also cancelled for the second year in a row. By mid-August, the rising number of infections in Malaysia caused the cancellation of the Grand Prix in that country (replaced by a second round at the Misano circuit), meaning no championship rounds would be held east of Qatar for the second consecutive year.

== Teams and riders ==
Team	Constructor	Motorcycle	No.	Rider	Rounds
(Italy) Aprilia Racing Team Gresini	Aprilia	RS-GP	32	(Italy) Lorenzo Savadori	1–10, 12
(Italy) Aprilia Racing Team Gresini	Aprilia	RS-GP	12	(Spain) Maverick Viñales	13–14, 16–18
(Italy) Aprilia Racing Team Gresini	Aprilia	RS-GP	41	(Spain) Aleix Espargaró	All
(Italy) Aprilia Racing Team Gresini	Aprilia	RS-GP	32	(Italy) Lorenzo Savadori	16
(Italy) Ducati Lenovo Team	Ducati	Desmosedici GP21	43	(Australia) Jack Miller	All
(Italy) Ducati Lenovo Team	Ducati	Desmosedici GP21	63	(Italy) Francesco Bagnaia	All
(Italy) Ducati Lenovo Team	Ducati	Desmosedici GP21	51	(Italy) Michele Pirro	14, 16
(Italy) Pramac Racing	Ducati	Desmosedici GP21	5	(France) Johann Zarco	All
(Italy) Pramac Racing	Ducati	Desmosedici GP21	89	(Spain) Jorge Martín	1–3, 7–18
(Italy) Pramac Racing	Ducati	Desmosedici GP21	53	(Spain) Tito Rabat	4–5
(Italy) Pramac Racing	Ducati	Desmosedici GP21	51	(Italy) Michele Pirro	6
(Italy) Sky VR46 Esponsorama (Italy) Sky VR46 Avintia (Spain) Esponsorama Racing (Spain) Avintia Esponsorama	Ducati	Desmosedici GP19	10	(Italy) Luca Marini	All
(Italy) Sky VR46 Esponsorama (Italy) Sky VR46 Avintia (Spain) Esponsorama Racing (Spain) Avintia Esponsorama	Ducati	Desmosedici GP19	23	(Italy) Enea Bastianini	All
(Monaco) LCR Honda Idemitsu (Monaco) LCR Honda Castrol	Honda	RC213V	30	(Japan) Takaaki Nakagami	All
(Monaco) LCR Honda Idemitsu (Monaco) LCR Honda Castrol	Honda	RC213V	73	(Spain) Álex Márquez	All
(Japan) Repsol Honda Team	Honda	RC213V	44	(Spain) Pol Espargaró	All
(Japan) Repsol Honda Team	Honda	RC213V	93	(Spain) Marc Márquez	3–16
(Japan) Repsol Honda Team	Honda	RC213V	6	(Germany) Stefan Bradl	1–2, 17
(Japan) Honda HRC (Japan) Team Honda HRC	Honda	RC213V	6	(Germany) Stefan Bradl	4, 14
(Austria) Red Bull KTM Factory Racing	KTM	RC16	33	(South Africa) Brad Binder	All
(Austria) Red Bull KTM Factory Racing	KTM	RC16	88	(Portugal) Miguel Oliveira	All
(Austria) Red Bull KTM Factory Racing	KTM	RC16	26	(Spain) Dani Pedrosa	10
(France) Tech3 KTM Factory Racing	KTM	RC16	9	(Italy) Danilo Petrucci	All
(France) Tech3 KTM Factory Racing	KTM	RC16	27	(Spain) Iker Lecuona	All
(Japan) Team Suzuki Ecstar	Suzuki	GSX-RR	36	(Spain) Joan Mir	All
(Japan) Team Suzuki Ecstar	Suzuki	GSX-RR	42	(Spain) Álex Rins	1–6, 8–18
(Japan) Monster Energy Yamaha MotoGP	Yamaha	YZR-M1	12	(Spain) Maverick Viñales	1–10
(Japan) Monster Energy Yamaha MotoGP	Yamaha	YZR-M1	35	(United Kingdom) Cal Crutchlow	12–13
(Japan) Monster Energy Yamaha MotoGP	Yamaha	YZR-M1	21	(Italy) Franco Morbidelli	14–18
(Japan) Monster Energy Yamaha MotoGP	Yamaha	YZR-M1	20	(France) Fabio Quartararo	All
(Malaysia) Petronas Yamaha SRT	Yamaha	YZR-M1	21	(Italy) Franco Morbidelli	1–8
(Malaysia) Petronas Yamaha SRT	Yamaha	YZR-M1	31	(United States) Garrett Gerloff	9
(Malaysia) Petronas Yamaha SRT	Yamaha	YZR-M1	35	(United Kingdom) Cal Crutchlow	10–11
(Malaysia) Petronas Yamaha SRT	Yamaha	YZR-M1	96	(United Kingdom) Jake Dixon	12–13
(Malaysia) Petronas Yamaha SRT	Yamaha	YZR-M1	04	(Italy) Andrea Dovizioso	14–18
(Malaysia) Petronas Yamaha SRT	Yamaha	YZR-M1	46	(Italy) Valentino Rossi	All

Key
Regular rider
Replacement rider
Wildcard rider

All teams used series-specified Michelin tyres.

=== Rider changes ===
- Fabio Quartararo moved to the Yamaha factory team from Petronas Yamaha. Valentino Rossi swapped seats with Quartararo, leaving the Yamaha factory team after 15 seasons over two stints with the team.
- Pol Espargaró moved to Repsol Honda Team after 4 years with the KTM factory team, replacing Álex Márquez, who moved to LCR Honda under a Honda factory contract, in turn replacing Cal Crutchlow. Crutchlow joined Yamaha as a test rider, replacing incumbent test rider Jorge Lorenzo.
- Miguel Oliveira moved from KTM satellite team Tech3 to the factory team. Danilo Petrucci replaced Oliveira at Tech3 after two seasons with the Ducati factory team.
- Andrea Dovizioso left the Ducati factory team after 8 seasons with the team at the end of the 2020 season. On 10 November 2020, he announced his intentions to take a sabbatical for the 2021 season and focus on a return in 2022.
- Both Pramac Racing riders Jack Miller and Francesco Bagnaia moved to the factory Ducati team. Johann Zarco (coming from Esponsorama) and Jorge Martín (promoted from Moto2 with KTM Ajo) replaced them.
- Enea Bastianini and Luca Marini were promoted from Moto2 to Esponsorama Racing, replacing Zarco and Tito Rabat, the latter having his contract terminated prematurely for 2021 and moving to the Superbike World Championship.
- Lorenzo Savadori was promoted from a test rider position to a race seat for Aprilia Racing Team Gresini, after Andrea Iannone received a four-year competition ban for a doping violation.

==== Mid-season changes ====
- Stefan Bradl replaced Marc Márquez for the start of the season, as Márquez prolonged his recovery from his 2020 season-ending injury.
- Tito Rabat replaced Jorge Martín for the Spanish and French Grands Prix, while the rookie recovered from injuries sustained in a Saturday morning crash at the Portuguese round.
- Ducati test rider Michele Pirro replaced Martín for the Italian Grand Prix.
- Álex Rins missed the Catalan Grand Prix after suffering a broken arm prior to the race. He was not replaced for the round.
- Franco Morbidelli missed several races after injuring his left knee in a training accident. He was replaced by Garrett Gerloff for the Dutch round, Cal Crutchlow for the Styrian and Austrian rounds, and Jake Dixon for the British and Aragon rounds.
- Lorenzo Savadori underwent surgery after his crash in the Styrian round. He missed the succeeding Austrian round and was not replaced.
- Yamaha withdrew Maverick Viñales from the Austrian Grand Prix, citing "unexplained irregular operation of the motorcycle" during the Styrian Grand Prix. Yamaha subsequently terminated his contract on August 20, thereby removing Viñales' entry in the championship. He was replaced by Cal Crutchlow for the British and Aragon rounds. Franco Morbidelli was subsequently promoted to the factory team as their championship rider for the rest of the season and the future, reuniting Morbidelli with former Petronas SRT teammate Fabio Quartararo. Andrea Dovizioso eventually returned from his sabbatical and returned to MotoGP, replacing Morbidelli as SRT's championship rider for the rest of the season.
- Maverick Viñales returned to MotoGP from the Aragon Grand Prix onwards with Aprilia Racing Team Gresini, replacing Lorenzo Savadori as the championship rider for the remainder of the season, with Savadori returning to his previous role as the test/reserve rider. Viñales is contracted to ride for Aprilia in 2022.
- Maverick Viñales sat out of the Grand Prix of the Americas following the death of his cousin, Dean Berta Viñales, during the first round at Jerez in the 2021 Supersport 300 World Championship the previous week. He was not replaced for the round.
- Marc Márquez missed the Algarve and Valencian Grands Prix after suffering a slight concussion during training days prior the race. He was replaced by Stefan Bradl at Algarve, but HRC elected not to replace Márquez for the finale in Valencia.

== Calendar ==
The following Grands Prix took place in 2021:

Round	Date	Grand Prix	Circuit
1	28 March (Note: Night race)	Barwa Grand Prix of Qatar	Lusail International Circuit, Lusail
2	4 April	(Qatar) Tissot Grand Prix of Doha	Lusail International Circuit, Lusail
3	18 April	Grande Prémio 888 de Portugal	Algarve International Circuit, Portimão
4	2 May	(Spain) Gran Premio Red Bull de España	Circuito de Jerez, Jerez de la Frontera
5	16 May	Shark Grand Prix de France	Bugatti Circuit, Le Mans
6	30 May	(Italy) Gran Premio d'Italia Oakley	Mugello Circuit, Scarperia e San Piero
7	6 June	(Catalonia) Gran Premi Monster Energy de Catalunya	Circuit de Barcelona-Catalunya, Montmeló
8	20 June	(Germany) Liqui Moly Motorrad Grand Prix Deutschland	Sachsenring, Hohenstein-Ernstthal
9	27 June	(Netherlands) Motul TT Assen	TT Circuit Assen, Assen
10	8 August	Michelin Grand Prix of Styria	Red Bull Ring, Spielberg
11	15 August	(Austria) Bitci Motorrad Grand Prix von Österreich	Red Bull Ring, Spielberg
12	29 August	(United Kingdom) Monster Energy British Grand Prix	Silverstone Circuit, Silverstone
13	12 September	(Aragon) Gran Premio Tissot de Aragón	MotorLand Aragón, Alcañiz
14	19 September	Gran Premio Octo di San Marino e della Riviera di Rimini	Misano World Circuit, Misano Adriatico
15	3 October	(United States) Red Bull Grand Prix of the Americas	Circuit of the Americas, Austin
16	24 October	Gran Premio Nolan del Made in Italy e dell'Emilia-Romagna	Misano World Circuit, Misano Adriatico
17	7 November	(Portugal) Grande Prémio Brembo do Algarve	Algarve International Circuit, Portimão
18	14 November	(Valencian Community) Gran Premio Motul de la Comunitat Valenciana	Circuit Ricardo Tormo, Valencia
Cancelled Grands Prix
-	~~11 April~~	(Argentina) Argentine Republic motorcycle Grand Prix	Autódromo Termas de Río Hondo, Termas de Río Hondo
-	~~11 July~~	(Finland) Finnish motorcycle Grand Prix	Kymi Ring, Iitti
-	~~3 October~~	(Japan) Japanese motorcycle Grand Prix	Motegi Circuit, Motegi
-	~~17 October~~	Thailand motorcycle Grand Prix	Buriram International Circuit, Buriram
-	~~24 October~~	(Australia) Australian motorcycle Grand Prix	Phillip Island Grand Prix Circuit, Phillip Island
-	~~24 October~~	(Malaysia) Malaysian motorcycle Grand Prix	Sepang International Circuit, Sepang

=== Grand Prix locations ===
Location of non-European Grands Prix in 2021.
(scheduled Grand Prix: cancelled Grand Prix)
Location of European Grands Prix in 2021.
(scheduled Grand Prix: cancelled Grand Prix)

=== Calendar changes ===
- The Finnish Grand Prix was due to be reintroduced to the calendar after a 38-year absence. The venue hosting the round was to be the new Kymi Ring, instead of the Pyynikki Circuit used in 1962 and 1963, or the Imatra Circuit which hosted the round until 1982. The Finnish Grand Prix had been included on the 2020 calendar, but the inaugural race was cancelled in response to the COVID-19 pandemic.
- The Czech Republic Grand Prix was initially left off the provisional calendar, as the circuit requires mandatory resurfacing for safety compliance, and it was unclear if the necessary work could be completed in time for its typical schedule date in early August. The 11th round of the championship was therefore left open as provisionally pending. On 8 December 2020, Brno city councillors opted out of the 2021 calendar, citing financial difficulties due to the COVID-19 pandemic. It marked the first absence of a Grand Prix in Brno since 1992. The mayor of Brno hopes for the return of the championship in 2022.

==== Calendar changes as a reaction to COVID-19 pandemic ====
- With the uncertainty of the development of the COVID-19 pandemic, championship organizer Dorna elected in November 2020 to nominate three "Reserve Grand Prix Venues" which could be used in the event that local virus containment measures or regulations force the cancellation of a planned Grand Prix.
  - The Portuguese Grand Prix at Algarve had previously returned to the schedule as a replacement race for the final round of the COVID-19 shortened 2020 season.
  - The Indonesian Grand Prix was originally planned to be reintroduced to the main calendar after a 23-year absence before being designated a Reserve Grand Prix for 2021. The venue hosting the round would be the new Mandalika International Street Circuit, instead of the Sentul International Circuit used in 1996 and 1997.
  - A Russian Grand Prix would see the inaugural motorcycle Grand Prix in that country. The Igora Drive circuit would be used.
- On 22 January 2021, Dorna significantly updated the provisional calendar including the following changes:
  - The Argentine and American Grands Prix would be postponed due to the COVID-19 situation in both countries, with potential rescheduling for the final quarter of 2021.
  - A double-header would open the season in Qatar on 28 March and 4 April, followed by Portugal as the third round.
  - The provisionally pending race created by the absence of the Czech Grand Prix was removed.
  - The potential Russian Grand Prix was removed from the reserve list, leaving Indonesia as the sole Reserve Grand Prix Venue.
- On 14 May the Finnish Grand Prix was cancelled due to the COVID-19 situation, and the Styrian Grand Prix would replace it on the date of 8 August. It was also confirmed that the Indonesian Grand Prix would remain a reserve Grand Prix in the 2021 calendar, subject to circuit homologation.
- On 23 June the Japanese Grand Prix was cancelled due to the COVID-19 situation, with the previously postponed Grand Prix of the Americas taking its place in the calendar. This also led to the postponement of the Thailand Grand Prix by one week.
- On 6 July the Australian Grand Prix was cancelled due to the COVID-19 situation, with the Malaysian Grand Prix brought forward by a week to replace it on the date of 24 October. In addition, a new Grand Prix, the Algarve Grand Prix, was introduced, which is scheduled to be held on 7 November.
- On 21 July the Thailand Grand Prix was cancelled due to the COVID-19 restrictions in the country.
- On 19 August the Malaysian Grand Prix was cancelled due to the COVID-19 restrictions in the country. For its replacement, a second Grand Prix at Misano was introduced, having the same schedule as the cancelled Malaysian round.
- On 11 September the final championship calendar comprising 18 Grands Prix was confirmed. The Emilia Romagna and Rimini Riviera Grand Prix returned as the second Grand Prix at Misano, now having the shortened name of Emilia Romagna Grand Prix. The previously postponed Argentine Grand Prix was also cancelled.

== Results and standings ==
=== Grands Prix ===
Round	Grand Prix	Pole position	Fastest lap	Winning rider	Winning team	Winning constructor	Report
1	Qatar motorcycle Grand Prix	(Italy) Francesco Bagnaia	(Spain) Maverick Viñales	(Spain) Maverick Viñales	(Japan) Monster Energy Yamaha MotoGP	(Japan) Yamaha	Report
2	(Qatar) Doha motorcycle Grand Prix	(Spain) Jorge Martín	(Italy) Francesco Bagnaia	(France) Fabio Quartararo	(Japan) Monster Energy Yamaha MotoGP	(Japan) Yamaha	Report
3	(Portugal) Portuguese motorcycle Grand Prix	(France) Fabio Quartararo	(Spain) Álex Rins	(France) Fabio Quartararo	(Japan) Monster Energy Yamaha MotoGP	(Japan) Yamaha	Report
4	(Spain) Spanish motorcycle Grand Prix	(France) Fabio Quartararo	(France) Fabio Quartararo	(Australia) Jack Miller	(Italy) Ducati Lenovo Team	(Italy) Ducati	Report
5	(France) French motorcycle Grand Prix	(France) Fabio Quartararo	(France) Fabio Quartararo	(Australia) Jack Miller	(Italy) Ducati Lenovo Team	(Italy) Ducati	Report
6	(Italy) Italian motorcycle Grand Prix	(France) Fabio Quartararo	(France) Johann Zarco	(France) Fabio Quartararo	(Japan) Monster Energy Yamaha MotoGP	(Japan) Yamaha	Report
7	(Catalonia) Catalan motorcycle Grand Prix	(France) Fabio Quartararo	(France) Johann Zarco	(Portugal) Miguel Oliveira	(Austria) Red Bull KTM Factory Racing	(Austria) KTM	Report
8	(Germany) German motorcycle Grand Prix	(France) Johann Zarco	(Portugal) Miguel Oliveira	(Spain) Marc Márquez	(Japan) Repsol Honda Team	(Japan) Honda	Report
9	(Netherlands) Dutch TT	(Spain) Maverick Viñales	(France) Fabio Quartararo	(France) Fabio Quartararo	(Japan) Monster Energy Yamaha MotoGP	(Japan) Yamaha	Report
10	(Styria) Styrian motorcycle Grand Prix	(Spain) Jorge Martín	(Spain) Joan Mir	(Spain) Jorge Martín	(Italy) Pramac Racing	(Italy) Ducati	Report
11	(Austria) Austrian motorcycle Grand Prix	(Spain) Jorge Martín	(France) Fabio Quartararo	(South Africa) Brad Binder	(Austria) Red Bull KTM Factory Racing	(Austria) KTM	Report
12	(United Kingdom) British motorcycle Grand Prix	(Spain) Pol Espargaró	(France) Fabio Quartararo	(France) Fabio Quartararo	(Japan) Monster Energy Yamaha MotoGP	(Japan) Yamaha	Report
13	Aragon motorcycle Grand Prix	(Italy) Francesco Bagnaia	(Spain) Marc Márquez	(Italy) Francesco Bagnaia	(Italy) Ducati Lenovo Team	(Italy) Ducati	Report
14	San Marino and Rimini Riviera motorcycle Grand Prix	(Italy) Francesco Bagnaia	(Italy) Enea Bastianini	(Italy) Francesco Bagnaia	(Italy) Ducati Lenovo Team	(Italy) Ducati	Report
15	(United States) Motorcycle Grand Prix of the Americas	(Italy) Francesco Bagnaia	(Spain) Marc Márquez	(Spain) Marc Márquez	(Japan) Repsol Honda Team	(Japan) Honda	Report
16	(Emilia-Romagna) Emilia Romagna motorcycle Grand Prix	(Italy) Francesco Bagnaia	(Italy) Francesco Bagnaia	(Spain) Marc Márquez	(Japan) Repsol Honda Team	(Japan) Honda	Report
17	(Portugal) Algarve motorcycle Grand Prix	(Italy) Francesco Bagnaia	(Italy) Francesco Bagnaia	(Italy) Francesco Bagnaia	(Italy) Ducati Lenovo Team	(Italy) Ducati	Report
18	Valencian Community motorcycle Grand Prix	(Spain) Jorge Martín	(Italy) Francesco Bagnaia	(Italy) Francesco Bagnaia	(Italy) Ducati Lenovo Team	(Italy) Ducati	Report

=== Riders' standings ===
Scoring system

Points were awarded to the top fifteen finishers. A rider had to finish the race to earn points.

Position	1st	2nd	3rd	4th	5th	6th	7th	8th	9th	10th	11th	12th	13th	14th	15th
Points	25	20	16	13	11	10	9	8	7	6	5	4	3	2	1

Pos.	Rider	Bike	Team	QAT (Qatar)	DOH (Qatar)	POR (Portugal)	SPA (Spain)	FRA (France)	ITA (Italy)	CAT (Catalonia)	GER (Germany)	NED (Netherlands)	STY (Styria)	AUT (Austria)	GBR (United Kingdom)	ARA (Aragon)	RSM (San Marino)	AME (United States)	EMI (Emilia-Romagna)	ALR (Portugal)	VAL (Valencian Community)	Pts
1	(France) Fabio Quartararo	Yamaha	Monster Energy Yamaha MotoGP	5	1	1^{P}	13^{P F}	3^{P F}	1^{P}	6^{P}	3	1^{F}	3	7^{F}	1^{F}	8	2	2	4	Ret	5	278
2	(Italy) Francesco Bagnaia	Ducati	Ducati Lenovo Team	3^{P}	6^{F}	2	2	4	Ret	7	5	6	11	2	14	1^{P}	1^{P}	3^{P}	Ret^{P F}	1^{P F}	1^{F}	252
3	(Spain) Joan Mir	Suzuki	Team Suzuki Ecstar	4	7	3	5	Ret	3	4	9	3	2^{F}	4	9	3	6	8	Ret	2	4	208
4	(Australia) Jack Miller	Ducati	Ducati Lenovo Team	9	9	Ret	1	1	6	3	6	Ret	Ret	11	4	5	5	7	Ret	3	3	181
5	(France) Johann Zarco	Ducati	Pramac Racing	2	2	Ret	8	2	4^{F}	2^{F}	8^{P}	4	6	Ret	11	17	12	Ret	5	5	6	173
6	(South Africa) Brad Binder	KTM	Red Bull KTM Factory Racing	14	8	5	Ret	13	5	8	4	12	4	1	6	7	9	9	11	10	7	151
7	(Spain) Marc Márquez	Honda	Repsol Honda Team			7	9	Ret	Ret	Ret	1	7	8	15	Ret	2^{F}	4	1^{F}	1			142
8	(Spain) Aleix Espargaró	Aprilia	Aprilia Racing Team Gresini	7	10	6	6	Ret	7	Ret	7	8	Ret	10	3	4	8	Ret	7	Ret	9	120
9	(Spain) Jorge Martín	Ducati	Pramac Racing	15	3^{P}	DNS				14	12	Ret	1^{P}	3^{P}	Ret	9	Ret	5	Ret	7	2^{P}	111
10	(Spain) Maverick Viñales	Yamaha	Monster Energy Yamaha MotoGP	1^{F}	5	11	7	10	8	5	19	2^{P}	NC									106
10	(Spain) Maverick Viñales	Aprilia	Aprilia Racing Team Gresini													18	13		8	16	16	106
11	(Italy) Enea Bastianini	Ducati	Avintia Esponsorama	10	11	9	Ret	14	Ret	10	16	15	12	Ret	12	6	3^{F}	6	3	9	8	102
12	(Spain) Pol Espargaró	Honda	Repsol Honda Team	8	13	Ret	10	8	12	Ret	10	10	16	16	5^{P}	13	7	10	2	6	DNS	100
13	(Spain) Álex Rins	Suzuki	Team Suzuki Ecstar	6	4	Ret^{F}	20	Ret	Ret		11	11	7	14	2	12	Ret	4	6	8	Ret	99
14	(Portugal) Miguel Oliveira	KTM	Red Bull KTM Factory Racing	13	15	16	11	Ret	2	1	2^{F}	5	Ret	Ret	16	14	20	11	Ret	Ret	14	94
15	(Japan) Takaaki Nakagami	Honda	LCR Honda Idemitsu	Ret	17	10	4	7	Ret	13	13	9	5	13	13	10	10	17	15	11	Ret	76
16	(Spain) Álex Márquez	Honda	LCR Honda Castrol	Ret	Ret	8	Ret	6	14	11	Ret	14	9	9	8	Ret	15	12	Ret	4	13	70
17	(Italy) Franco Morbidelli	Yamaha	Petronas Yamaha SRT	18	12	4	3	16	16	9	18											47
17	(Italy) Franco Morbidelli	Yamaha	Monster Energy Yamaha MotoGP														18	19	14	17	11	47
18	(Italy) Valentino Rossi	Yamaha	Petronas Yamaha SRT	12	16	Ret	16	11	10	Ret	14	Ret	13	8	18	19	17	15	10	13	10	44
19	(Italy) Luca Marini	Ducati	Sky VR46 Avintia	16	18	12	15	12	17	12	15	18	14	5	15	20	19	14	9	12	17	41
20	(Spain) Iker Lecuona	KTM	Tech3 KTM Factory Racing	17	Ret	15	17	9	11	Ret	17	Ret	15	6	7	11	Ret	16	Ret	Ret	15	39
21	(Italy) Danilo Petrucci	KTM	Tech3 KTM Factory Racing	Ret	19	13	14	5	9	Ret	Ret	13	18	12	10	15	16	18	Ret	Ret	18	37
22	(Germany) Stefan Bradl	Honda	Repsol Honda Team	11	14															15		14
22	(Germany) Stefan Bradl	Honda	Team Honda HRC				12										14					14
23	(Italy) Michele Pirro	Ducati	Pramac Racing						13													12
23	(Italy) Michele Pirro	Ducati	Ducati Lenovo Team														11		12			12
24	(Italy) Andrea Dovizioso	Yamaha	Petronas Yamaha SRT														21	13	13	14	12	12
25	(Spain) Dani Pedrosa	KTM	Red Bull KTM Factory Racing										10									6
26	(Italy) Lorenzo Savadori	Aprilia	Aprilia Racing Team Gresini	19	20	14	19	Ret	15	15	Ret	16	DNS		DNS				DNS			4
27	(Spain) Tito Rabat	Ducati	Pramac Racing				18	15														1
28	(United Kingdom) Cal Crutchlow	Yamaha	Petronas Yamaha SRT										17	17								0
28	(United Kingdom) Cal Crutchlow	Yamaha	Monster Energy Yamaha MotoGP												17	16						0
29	(United States) Garrett Gerloff	Yamaha	Petronas Yamaha SRT									17										0
30	(United Kingdom) Jake Dixon	Yamaha	Petronas Yamaha SRT												19	Ret						0
Pos.	Rider	Bike	Team	QAT (Qatar)	DOH (Qatar)	POR (Portugal)	SPA (Spain)	FRA (France)	ITA (Italy)	CAT (Catalonia)	GER (Germany)	NED (Netherlands)	STY (Styria)	AUT (Austria)	GBR (United Kingdom)	ARA (Aragon)	RSM (San Marino)	AME (United States)	EMI (Emilia-Romagna)	ALR (Portugal)	VAL (Valencian Community)	Pts

Race key
Colour	Result
Gold	Winner
Silver	2nd place
Bronze	3rd place
Green	Points finish
Blue	Non-points finish
Blue	Non-classified finish (NC)
Purple	Retired (Ret)
Red	Did not qualify (DNQ)
Black	Disqualified (DSQ)
White	Did not start (DNS)
White	Withdrew (WD)
White	Race cancelled (C)
Blank	Did not practice (DNP)
Blank	Excluded (EX)
Blank	Did not arrive (DNA)
Blank	Did not enter (empty cell)
Annotation	Meaning
P	Pole position
F	Fastest lap
Rider key
Colour	Meaning
Light blue	Rookie rider

=== Constructors' standings ===
Each constructor received the same number of points as their best placed rider in each race.

Pos.	Constructor	QAT (Qatar)	DOH (Qatar)	POR (Portugal)	SPA (Spain)	FRA (France)	ITA (Italy)	CAT (Catalonia)	GER (Germany)	NED (Netherlands)	STY (Styria)	AUT (Austria)	GBR (United Kingdom)	ARA (Aragon)	RSM (San Marino)	AME (United States)	EMI (Emilia-Romagna)	ALR (Portugal)	VAL (Valencian Community)	Pts
1	(Italy) Ducati	2	2	2	1	1	4	2	5	4	1	2	4	1	1	3	3	1	1	357
2	(Japan) Yamaha	1	1	1	3	3	1	5	3	1	3	7	1	8	2	2	4	13	5	309
3	(Japan) Suzuki	4	4	3	5	Ret	3	4	9	3	2	4	2	3	6	4	6	2	4	240
4	(Japan) Honda	8	13	7	4	6	12	11	1	7	5	9	5	2	4	1	1	4	13	214
5	(Austria) KTM	13	8	5	11	5	2	1	2	5	4	1	6	7	9	9	11	10	7	205
6	(Italy) Aprilia	7	10	6	6	Ret	7	15	7	8	Ret	10	3	4	8	Ret	7	16	9	121
Pos.	Constructor	QAT (Qatar)	DOH (Qatar)	POR (Portugal)	SPA (Spain)	FRA (France)	ITA (Italy)	CAT (Catalonia)	GER (Germany)	NED (Netherlands)	STY (Styria)	AUT (Austria)	GBR (United Kingdom)	ARA (Aragon)	RSM (San Marino)	AME (United States)	EMI (Emilia-Romagna)	ALR (Portugal)	VAL (Valencian Community)	Pts

=== Teams' standings ===
The teams' standings were based on results obtained by regular and substitute riders; wild-card entries were ineligible.

Pos.	Team	Bike No.	QAT (Qatar)	DOH (Qatar)	POR (Portugal)	SPA (Spain)	FRA (France)	ITA (Italy)	CAT (Catalonia)	GER (Germany)	NED (Netherlands)	STY (Styria)	AUT (Austria)	GBR (United Kingdom)	ARA (Aragon)	RSM (San Marino)	AME (United States)	EMI (Emilia-Romagna)	ALR (Portugal)	VAL (Valencian Community)	Pts
1	(Italy) Ducati Lenovo Team	43	9	9	Ret	1	1	6	3	6	Ret	Ret	11	4	5	5	7	Ret	3	3	433
1	(Italy) Ducati Lenovo Team	63	3^{P}	6^{F}	2	2	4	Ret	7	5	6	11	2	14	1^{P}	1^{P}	3^{P}	Ret^{P F}	1^{P F}	1^{F}	433
2	(Japan) Monster Energy Yamaha MotoGP	12	1^{F}	5	11	7	10	8	5	19	2^{P}	NC									380
2	(Japan) Monster Energy Yamaha MotoGP	20	5	1	1^{P}	13^{P F}	3^{P F}	1^{P}	6^{P}	3	1^{F}	3	7^{F}	1^{F}	8	2	2	4	Ret	5	380
2	(Japan) Monster Energy Yamaha MotoGP	21														18	19	14	17	11	380
2	(Japan) Monster Energy Yamaha MotoGP	35												17	16						380
3	(Japan) Team Suzuki Ecstar	36	4	7	3	5	Ret	3	4	9	3	2^{F}	4	9	3	6	8	Ret	2	4	307
3	(Japan) Team Suzuki Ecstar	42	6	4	Ret^{F}	20	Ret	Ret		11	11	7	14	2	12	Ret	4	6	8	Ret	307
4	(Italy) Pramac Racing	5	2	2	Ret	8	2	4^{F}	2^{F}	8^{P}	4	6	Ret	11	17	12	Ret	5	5	6	288
4	(Italy) Pramac Racing	51						13													288
4	(Italy) Pramac Racing	53				18	15														288
4	(Italy) Pramac Racing	89	15	3^{P}	DNS				14	12	Ret	1^{P}	3^{P}	Ret	9	Ret	5	Ret	7	2^{P}	288
5	(Japan) Repsol Honda Team	6	11	14															15		250
5	(Japan) Repsol Honda Team	44	8	13	Ret	10	8	12	Ret	10	10	16	16	5^{P}	13	7	10	2	6	DNS	250
5	(Japan) Repsol Honda Team	93			7	9	Ret	Ret	Ret	1	7	8	15	Ret	2^{F}	4	1^{F}	1			250
6	(Austria) Red Bull KTM Factory Racing	33	14	8	5	Ret	13	5	8	4	12	4	1	6	7	9	9	11	10	7	245
6	(Austria) Red Bull KTM Factory Racing	88	13	15	16	11	Ret	2	1	2^{F}	5	Ret	Ret	16	14	20	11	Ret	Ret	14	245
7	(Monaco) LCR Honda	30	Ret	17	10	4	7	Ret	13	13	9	5	13	13	10	10	17	15	11	Ret	146
7	(Monaco) LCR Honda	73	Ret	Ret	8	Ret	6	14	11	Ret	14	9	9	8	Ret	15	12	Ret	4	13	146
8	(Spain) Esponsorama Racing	10	16	18	12	15	12	17	12	15	18	14	5	15	20	19	14	9	12	17	143
8	(Spain) Esponsorama Racing	23	10	11	9	Ret	14	Ret	10	16	15	12	Ret	12	6	3^{F}	6	3	9	8	143
9	(Italy) Aprilia Racing Team Gresini	12													18	13		8	16	16	135
9	(Italy) Aprilia Racing Team Gresini	32	19	20	14	19	Ret	15	15	Ret	16	DNS		DNS							135
9	(Italy) Aprilia Racing Team Gresini	41	7	10	6	6	Ret	7	Ret	7	8	Ret	10	3	4	8	Ret	7	Ret	9	135
10	(Malaysia) Petronas Yamaha SRT	04														21	13	13	14	12	96
10	(Malaysia) Petronas Yamaha SRT	21	18	12	4	3	16	16	9	18											96
10	(Malaysia) Petronas Yamaha SRT	31									17										96
10	(Malaysia) Petronas Yamaha SRT	35										17	17								96
10	(Malaysia) Petronas Yamaha SRT	46	12	16	Ret	16	11	10	Ret	14	Ret	13	8	18	19	17	15	10	13	10	96
10	(Malaysia) Petronas Yamaha SRT	96												19	Ret						96
11	(France) Tech3 KTM Factory Racing	9	Ret	19	13	14	5	9	Ret	Ret	13	18	12	10	15	16	18	Ret	Ret	18	76
11	(France) Tech3 KTM Factory Racing	27	17	Ret	15	17	9	11	Ret	17	Ret	15	6	7	11	Ret	16	Ret	Ret	15	76
Pos.	Team	Bike No.	QAT (Qatar)	DOH (Qatar)	POR (Portugal)	SPA (Spain)	FRA (France)	ITA (Italy)	CAT (Catalonia)	GER (Germany)	NED (Netherlands)	STY (Styria)	AUT (Austria)	GBR (United Kingdom)	ARA (Aragon)	RSM (San Marino)	AME (United States)	EMI (Emilia-Romagna)	ALR (Portugal)	VAL (Valencian Community)	Pts
