= Thailand motorcycle Grand Prix =

World racing grand prize

Thailand Grand Prix

Grand Prix motorcycle racing
- Venue: Chang International Circuit (2018–2019, 2022–present)
- First race: 2018
- Most wins (rider): Marc Márquez (3)
- Most wins (manufacturer): Kalex (6)

The Thailand motorcycle Grand Prix is a motorcycle Grand Prix event that started in 2018. The race is hosted at Chang International Circuit near Buriram in Buriram province. In 2020 and 2021, the race was cancelled due to the COVID-19 pandemic. The event is due to take place at the Buriram International Circuit until at least 2031.

On 21 August 2024, it was announced that the Thailand Grand Prix will be the first round of the 2025 and 2026 seasons.

== Official names and sponsors ==
- 2018–2019: PTT Thailand Grand Prix
- 2022–2023: OR Thailand Grand Prix
- 2024–present: PT Grand Prix of Thailand

== Winners ==
=== Multiple winners (riders) ===
# Wins	Rider	Wins	
# Wins	Rider	Category	Years won
3	(Spain) Marc Márquez	MotoGP	2018, 2019, 2025
2	(Colombia) David Alonso	Moto3	2023, 2024
2	(Italy) Francesco Bagnaia	MotoGP	2024
2	(Italy) Francesco Bagnaia	Moto2	2018
2	(Spain) Manuel González	Moto2	2025, 2026

=== Multiple winners (manufacturers) ===
# Wins	Manufacturer	Wins	
# Wins	Manufacturer	Category	Years won
6	(Germany) Kalex	Moto2	2018, 2019, 2022, 2024, 2025, 2026
4	(Japan) Honda	MotoGP	2018, 2019
4	(Japan) Honda	Moto3	2018, 2022
4	(Austria) KTM	MotoGP	2022
4	(Austria) KTM	Moto3	2019, 2025, 2026
3	(Italy) Ducati	MotoGP	2023, 2024, 2025

=== By year ===
Year	Track	Moto3		Moto2		MotoGP		Report
Year	Track	Rider	Manufacturer	Rider	Manufacturer	Rider	Manufacturer	Report
2026	Buriram	(Spain) David Almansa	KTM	(Spain) Manuel González	Kalex	(Italy) Marco Bezzecchi	Aprilia	Report
2025	Buriram	(Spain) José Antonio Rueda	KTM	(Spain) Manuel González	Kalex	(Spain) Marc Márquez	Ducati	Report
2024	Buriram	(Colombia) David Alonso	CFMoto	(Spain) Arón Canet	Kalex	(Italy) Francesco Bagnaia	Ducati	Report
2023	Buriram	(Colombia) David Alonso	GasGas	(Spain) Fermín Aldeguer	Boscoscuro	(Spain) Jorge Martín	Ducati	Report
2022	Buriram	(Italy) Dennis Foggia	Honda	(Italy) Tony Arbolino	Kalex	(Portugal) Miguel Oliveira	KTM	Report
2021	Buriram	Cancelled due to COVID-19 concerns						
2020	Buriram	Cancelled due to COVID-19 concerns						
2019	Buriram	(Spain) Albert Arenas	KTM	(Italy) Luca Marini	Kalex	(Spain) Marc Márquez	Honda	Report
2018	Buriram	(Italy) Fabio Di Giannantonio	Honda	(Italy) Francesco Bagnaia	Kalex	(Spain) Marc Márquez	Honda	Report
