= Styrian motorcycle Grand Prix =

Styrian Grand Prix

Grand Prix motorcycle racing
- Venue: Red Bull Ring (2020–2021)
- First race: 2020
- Last race: 2021
- Most wins (rider): Marco Bezzecchi (2)
- Most wins (manufacturer): KTM (3)

The Styrian motorcycle Grand Prix was a motorcycling event that was introduced during the 2020 Grand Prix motorcycle racing season and retained for the 2021 season as a response to the COVID-19 pandemic. For 2021, it replaced the initially scheduled Finnish Grand Prix as the 10th round of the season.

== Official names and sponsors ==
- 2020: BMW M Grand Prix of Styria
- 2021: Michelin Grand Prix of Styria

== Winners ==
=== Multiple winners (riders) ===
# Wins	Rider	Wins	
# Wins	Rider	Category	Years won
2	(Italy) Marco Bezzecchi	Moto2	2020, 2021

=== Multiple winners (manufacturers) ===
# Wins	Manufacturer	Wins	
# Wins	Manufacturer	Category	Years won
3	(Austria) KTM	MotoGP	2020
3	(Austria) KTM	Moto3	2020, 2021
2	(Germany) Kalex	Moto2	2020, 2021

=== By year ===
Year	Track	Moto3		Moto2		MotoGP		Report
Year	Track	Rider	Manufacturer	Rider	Manufacturer	Rider	Manufacturer	Report
2021	Spielberg	(Spain) Pedro Acosta	KTM	(Italy) Marco Bezzecchi	Kalex	(Spain) Jorge Martín	Ducati	Report
2020	Spielberg	(Italy) Celestino Vietti	KTM	(Italy) Marco Bezzecchi	Kalex	(Portugal) Miguel Oliveira	KTM	Report
