= Qatar motorcycle Grand Prix =

Motorcycle race held in Qatar

Coordinates: 25°29′24″N 51°27′15″E

Qatar Grand Prix

Grand Prix motorcycle racing
- Venue: Lusail International Circuit (2004–present)
- First race: 2004
- Most wins (rider): Jorge Lorenzo (6)
- Most wins (manufacturer): Aprilia, Kalex (13)

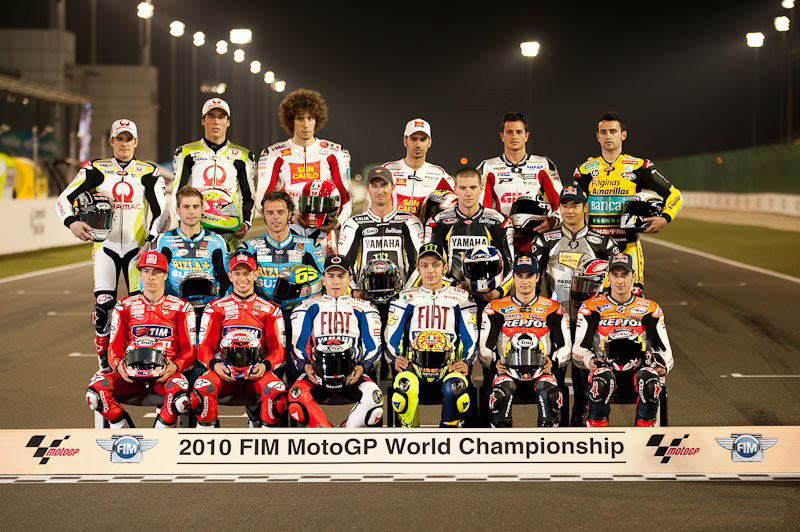
Riders of the 2010 Grand Prix at Losail

The Qatar motorcycle Grand Prix (Arabic: جائزة قطر الكبرى للدراجات النارية) is a motorcycling event that is part of the FIM Grand Prix motorcycle racing season.

The Lusail race track in Qatar represents the debut race of each MotoGP season. In 2008, the track held the first night event in MotoGP history. The 2008 night event, aside from drawing boosted viewing which also coincided with the race being moved to the opening spot on the calendar, was initiated with the intent of increasing equipment performance: the day-time heat in Qatar has been hazardous to the conditions of tires and expensive, customized parts on the multimillion-dollar motorcycles. Rider safety notwithstanding, the extreme heat could be a critical variable contributing to defeat. Qatar's Grand Prix is the only event in the entire MotoGP calendar to be held at night.

The 2020 MotoGP race was scheduled to open the season before being cancelled due to the COVID-19 pandemic. The Moto2 and Moto3 classes proceeded as planned.

The event is due to take place at the Lusail International Circuit until at least 2031.

== Official names and sponsors ==
- 2004–2005: Marlboro Grand Prix of Qatar
- 2006–2016: Commercial Bank Grand Prix of Qatar
- 2017–2018, 2022: Grand Prix of Qatar (no official sponsor)
- 2019: VisitQatar Grand Prix
- 2020: QNB Grand Prix of Qatar
- 2021: Barwa Grand Prix of Qatar
- 2023–present: Qatar Airways Grand Prix of Qatar

== Criticism ==
The race has been argued to be an example of sportswashing.

== Winners ==
=== Multiple winners (riders) ===
# Wins	Rider	Wins	
# Wins	Rider	Category	Years won
6	(Spain) Jorge Lorenzo	MotoGP	2012, 2013, 2016
6	(Spain) Jorge Lorenzo	250cc	2006, 2007
6	(Spain) Jorge Lorenzo	125cc	2004
5	(Australia) Casey Stoner	MotoGP	2007, 2008, 2009, 2011
5	(Australia) Casey Stoner	250cc	2005
4	(Italy) Valentino Rossi	MotoGP	2005, 2006, 2010, 2015
3	(Spain) Maverick Viñales	MotoGP	2017, 2021
3	(Spain) Maverick Viñales	Moto3	2012
3	(Spain) Marc Márquez	MotoGP	2014, 2025
3	(Spain) Marc Márquez	Moto2	2012
2	(Spain) Nicolás Terol	125cc	2010, 2011
2	(Italy) Andrea Dovizioso	MotoGP	2018, 2019
2	(Spain) Jaume Masià	Moto3	2021, 2023
2	(Italy) Francesco Bagnaia	MotoGP	2024
2	(Italy) Francesco Bagnaia	Moto2	2018

=== Multiple winners (manufacturers) ===
# Wins	Manufacturer	Wins	
# Wins	Manufacturer	Category	Years won
13	(Germany) Kalex	Moto2	2011, 2013, 2014, 2015, 2016, 2017, 2018, 2019, 2020, 2021, 2022, 2025, 2026
13	(Italy) Aprilia	MotoGP	2026
13	(Italy) Aprilia	250cc	2004, 2005, 2006, 2007, 2008, 2009
13	(Italy) Aprilia	125cc	2006, 2007, 2008, 2009, 2010, 2011
10	(Japan) Honda	MotoGP	2004, 2011, 2014
10	(Japan) Honda	Moto3	2015, 2016, 2017, 2018, 2019, 2022, 2023
9	(Japan) Yamaha	MotoGP	2005, 2006, 2010, 2012, 2013, 2015, 2016, 2017, 2021
9	(Italy) Ducati	MotoGP	2007, 2008, 2009, 2018, 2019, 2022, 2023, 2024, 2025
7	(Austria) KTM	Moto3	2013, 2014, 2020, 2021, 2025, 2026
7	(Austria) KTM	125cc	2005
2	(Switzerland) Suter	Moto2	2010, 2012
2	(Italy) Boscoscuro	Moto2	2023, 2024

=== By year ===
Year	Track	Moto3		Moto2		MotoGP		Report
Year	Track	Rider	Manufacturer	Rider	Manufacturer	Rider	Manufacturer	Report
2026	Lusail	(Spain) David Almansa	KTM	(Spain) Daniel Holgado	Kalex	(Italy) Marco Bezzecchi	Aprilia	Report
2025	Lusail	(Spain) Ángel Piqueras	KTM	(Spain) Arón Canet	Kalex	(Spain) Marc Márquez	Ducati	Report
2024	Lusail	(Colombia) David Alonso	CFMoto	(Spain) Alonso López	Boscoscuro	(Italy) Francesco Bagnaia	Ducati	Report
2023	Lusail	(Spain) Jaume Masià	Honda	(Spain) Fermín Aldeguer	Boscoscuro	(Italy) Fabio Di Giannantonio	Ducati	Report
2022	Lusail	(Italy) Andrea Migno	Honda	(Italy) Celestino Vietti	Kalex	(Italy) Enea Bastianini	Ducati	Report
2021	Lusail	(Spain) Jaume Masià	KTM	(United Kingdom) Sam Lowes	Kalex	(Spain) Maverick Viñales	Yamaha	Report
2020	Lusail	(Spain) Albert Arenas	KTM	(Japan) Tetsuta Nagashima	Kalex	Cancelled due to COVID-19 pandemic concerns		Report
2019	Lusail	(Japan) Kaito Toba	Honda	(Italy) Lorenzo Baldassarri	Kalex	(Italy) Andrea Dovizioso	Ducati	Report
2018	Lusail	(Spain) Jorge Martín	Honda	(Italy) Francesco Bagnaia	Kalex	(Italy) Andrea Dovizioso	Ducati	Report
2017	Lusail	(Spain) Joan Mir	Honda	(Italy) Franco Morbidelli	Kalex	(Spain) Maverick Viñales	Yamaha	Report
2016	Lusail	(Italy) Niccolò Antonelli	Honda	(Switzerland) Thomas Lüthi	Kalex	(Spain) Jorge Lorenzo	Yamaha	Report
2015	Lusail	(France) Alexis Masbou	Honda	(Germany) Jonas Folger	Kalex	(Italy) Valentino Rossi	Yamaha	Report
2014	Lusail	(Australia) Jack Miller	KTM	(Spain) Esteve Rabat	Kalex	(Spain) Marc Márquez	Honda	Report
2013	Lusail	(Spain) Luis Salom	KTM	(Spain) Pol Espargaró	Kalex	(Spain) Jorge Lorenzo	Yamaha	Report
2012	Lusail	(Spain) Maverick Viñales	FTR Honda	(Spain) Marc Márquez	Suter	(Spain) Jorge Lorenzo	Yamaha	Report
Year	Track	125cc		Moto2		MotoGP		Report
Year	Track	Rider	Manufacturer	Rider	Manufacturer	Rider	Manufacturer	Report
2011	Lusail	(Spain) Nicolás Terol	Aprilia	(Germany) Stefan Bradl	Kalex	(Australia) Casey Stoner	Honda	Report
2010	Lusail	(Spain) Nicolás Terol	Aprilia	(Japan) Shoya Tomizawa	Suter	(Italy) Valentino Rossi	Yamaha	Report
Year	Track	125cc		250cc		MotoGP		Report
Year	Track	Rider	Manufacturer	Rider	Manufacturer	Rider	Manufacturer	Report
2009	Lusail	(Italy) Andrea Iannone	Aprilia	(Spain) Héctor Barberá	Aprilia	(Australia) Casey Stoner	Ducati	Report
2008	Lusail	(Spain) Sergio Gadea	Aprilia	(Italy) Mattia Pasini	Aprilia	(Australia) Casey Stoner	Ducati	Report
2007	Lusail	(Spain) Héctor Faubel	Aprilia	(Spain) Jorge Lorenzo	Aprilia	(Australia) Casey Stoner	Ducati	Report
2006	Lusail	(Spain) Álvaro Bautista	Aprilia	(Spain) Jorge Lorenzo	Aprilia	(Italy) Valentino Rossi	Yamaha	Report
2005	Lusail	(Hungary) Gábor Talmácsi	KTM	(Australia) Casey Stoner	Aprilia	(Italy) Valentino Rossi	Yamaha	Report
2004	Lusail	(Spain) Jorge Lorenzo	Derbi	(Argentina) Sebastián Porto	Aprilia	(Spain) Sete Gibernau	Honda	Report
