= 2020 Styrian motorcycle Grand Prix =

(Styria) 2020 Styrian Grand Prix
Race details
- Race 6 of 15 races in the 2020 Grand Prix motorcycle racing season
- Date: 23 August 2020
- Official name: BMW M Grand Prix of Styria
- Location: Red Bull Ring; Spielberg, Styria, Austria
- Course: Permanent racing facility; 4.318 km (2.683 mi)

MotoGP
Pole position
Rider	(Spain) Pol Espargaró	KTM
Time	1:23.580	
Fastest lap
Rider	(Spain) Pol Espargaró	KTM
Time	1:23.877 on lap 4	
Podium
First	(Portugal) Miguel Oliveira	KTM
Second	(Australia) Jack Miller	Ducati
Third	(Spain) Pol Espargaró	KTM

Moto2
Pole position
Rider	(Spain) Arón Canet	Speed Up
Time	1:28.787	
Fastest lap
Rider	(Italy) Marco Bezzecchi	Kalex
Time	1:28.687 on lap 4	
Podium
First	(Italy) Marco Bezzecchi	Kalex
Second	(Spain) Jorge Martín	Kalex
Third	(Australia) Remy Gardner	Kalex

Moto3
Pole position
Rider	(Argentina) Gabriel Rodrigo	Honda
Time	1:36.470	
Fastest lap
Rider	(Japan) Ayumu Sasaki	KTM
Time	1:36.103 on lap 7	
Podium
First	(Italy) Celestino Vietti	KTM
Second	(Italy) Tony Arbolino	Honda
Third	(Japan) Ai Ogura	Honda

The 2020 Styrian motorcycle Grand Prix (officially known as the BMW M Grand Prix of Styria) was a Grand Prix motorcycle racing race held at the Red Bull Ring in Spielberg on 23 August 2020. It was the sixth round of the 2020 Grand Prix motorcycle racing season and the fifth round of the 2020 MotoGP World Championship. It was the first running of the Styrian motorcycle Grand Prix, and was held exactly one week after the 2020 Austrian Grand Prix on the same track, due to the rescheduling of the season because of the COVID-19 pandemic. The race was also the 900th premier class race.

In a dramatic race, Miguel Oliveira of Red Bull KTM Tech3 won from Jack Miller (Pramac Racing) and Pol Espargaro (Red Bull KTM Factory Racing) at the final corner, on the final lap to win his and his team's first MotoGP race. Oliveira is also the first Portuguese rider to win a Grand Prix race in the premier class. Oliveira's victory meant that ending the winning streaks for Ducati on Red Bull Ring - which is Ducati has won there 5 times.

For the first time since the 2016 Dutch TT, all classes were won by a first time winner in that class.

== Background ==
=== Impact of the COVID-19 pandemic ===
The opening rounds of the 2020 championship were heavily affected by the COVID-19 pandemic. Several Grands Prix were cancelled or postponed after the aborted opening round in Qatar, prompting the Fédération Internationale de Motocyclisme to draft a new calendar. However, the Austrian Grand Prix was not impacted by this change and kept its original date.

Organisers of the race signed a contract with Dorna Sports, the sport's commercial rights holder, to host a second round at the circuit on 23 August (a week after the first race) to be known as the "Styrian Grand Prix". The race was named for Styria, the state of Austria that the Red Bull Ring is located in. The race was also the second time in the sport's history that the same venue and circuit layout hosted back-to-back World Championship races.

=== MotoGP Championship standings before the race ===
After the fourth round at the 2020 Austrian Grand Prix, Fabio Quartararo on 67 points, leads the championship by 11 points over Andrea Dovizioso with Maverick Viñales a further 19 points behind.

In Teams' Championship, Petronas Yamaha SRT with 98 points, lead the championship from Monster Energy Yamaha, who have 86. Ducati Team sit 10 points behind the factory Yamaha in third, and are 16 points ahead of fourth-placed KTM Factory Racing, who have 42 points, while Team Suzuki Ecstar sit 5th on 50 points.

=== MotoGP Entrants ===
- Stefan Bradl replaced Marc Márquez from the Czech Republic round onwards while he recovered from injuries sustained in his opening round crash.
- Ducati test rider Michele Pirro replaced Francesco Bagnaia in Austria while he recovered from injuries sustained in a crash during practice at the Czech round.

== Free practice ==
The first practice session ended with Jack Miller fastest for Pramac Racing ahead of Ducati's Andrea Dovizioso and Tech3's Miguel Oliveira. The second practice session ended with Pol Espargaró fastest, followed by Nakagami and Joan Mir.

=== Combined Free Practice 1-2-3 ===
The top ten drivers (written in bold) qualified in Q2.

Pos.	No.	Bikers	Constructor	Free practice times		
Pos.	No.	Bikers	Constructor	FP1	FP2	FP3
1	36	(Spain) **Joan Mir**	**Suzuki**	1:23.961	1:23.907	**1:23.456**
2	20	(France) **Fabio Quartararo**	**Yamaha**	1:24.381	1:24.643	**1:23.607**
3	30	(Japan) **Takaaki Nakagami**	**Honda**	1:23.950	1:23.904	**1:23.610**
4	4	(Italy) **Andrea Dovizioso**	**Ducati**	1:23.863	1:24.774	**1:23.610**
5	12	(Spain) **Maverick Viñales**	**Yamaha**	1:24.324	1:24.060	**1:23.617**
6	44	(Spain) **Pol Espargaró**	**KTM**	1:24.397	**1:23.638**	1:23.660
7	88	(Portugal) **Miguel Oliveira**	**KTM**	1:23.898	1:24.118	**1:23.725**
8	21	(Italy) **Franco Morbidelli**	**Yamaha**	1:24.198	1:24.187	**1:23.727**
9	42	(Spain) **Álex Rins**	**Suzuki**	1:24.628	1:24.009	**1:23.754**
10	43	(Australia) **Jack Miller**	**Ducati**	1:23.859	1:24.925	**1:23.795**
11	33	(South Africa) Brad Binder	KTM	1:24.251	1:24.427	**1:23.798**
12	5	(France) Johann Zarco	Ducati	No time	No time	**1:23.879**
13	9	(Italy) Danilo Petrucci	Ducati	1:24.517	1:24.985	**1:23.881**
14	27	(Spain) Iker Lecuona	KTM	1:24.301	1:24.429	**1:23.889**
15	46	(Italy) Valentino Rossi	Yamaha	1:24.699	1:24.378	**1:23.950**
16	35	(United Kingdom) Cal Crutchlow	Honda	1:24.764	1:24.560	**1:24.126**
17	38	(United Kingdom) Bradley Smith	Aprilia	1:24.623	1:25.025	**1:24.136**
18	51	(Italy) Michele Pirro	Ducati	1:24.508	1:24.807	**1:24.296**
19	41	(Spain) Aleix Espargaró	Aprilia	1:24.808	**1:24.336**	1:24.423
20	73	(Spain) Álex Márquez	Honda	1:24.690	**1:24.463**	1:24.742
21	6	(Germany) Stefan Bradl	Honda	1:24.914	1:25.057	**1:24.617**
22	53	(Spain) Tito Rabat	Ducati	**1:24.806**	1:25.221	1:25.047
OFFICIAL MOTOGP FREE PRACTICE 1 REPORT
OFFICIAL MOTOGP FREE PRACTICE 2 REPORT
OFFICIAL MOTOGP FREE PRACTICE 3 REPORT

Fastest session lap

Personal Best lap

=== Free Practice 4 ===
The first three positions of the session were as follows.

Pos.	No.	Rider	Constructor	FP4 Time
1	30	(Japan) Takaaki Nakagami	Honda	1:24.450
2	36	(Spain) Joan Mir	Suzuki	1:24.460
3	44	(Spain) Pol Espargaró	KTM	1:24.523
OFFICIAL MOTOGP FREE PRACTICE 4 REPORT

== Qualifying ==
=== MotoGP ===
Pos.	No.	Rider	Constructor	Qualifying times		Final grid
Pos.	No.	Rider	Constructor	Q1	Q2	Final grid
1	44	(Spain) Pol Espargaró	KTM	Qualified in Q2	1:23.580	1
2	30	(Japan) Takaaki Nakagami	Honda	Qualified in Q2	1:23.602	2
3	5	(France) Johann Zarco	Ducati	1:23.609	1:23.632	PL^{1}
4	36	(Spain) Joan Mir	Suzuki	Qualified in Q2	1:23.678	3
5	43	(Australia) Jack Miller	Ducati	Qualified in Q2	1:23.700	4
6	12	(Spain) Maverick Viñales	Yamaha	Qualified in Q2	1:23.778	5
7	42	(Spain) Álex Rins	Suzuki	Qualified in Q2	1:23.782	6
8	88	(Portugal) Miguel Oliveira	KTM	Qualified in Q2	1:23.797	7
9	4	(Italy) Andrea Dovizioso	Ducati	Qualified in Q2	1:23.849	8
10	20	(France) Fabio Quartararo	Yamaha	Qualified in Q2	1:23.866	9
11	21	(Italy) Franco Morbidelli	Yamaha	Qualified in Q2	1:24.021	10
12	9	(Italy) Danilo Petrucci	Ducati	1:23.772	1:24.174	11
13	27	(Spain) Iker Lecuona	KTM	1:23.928	N/A	12
14	33	(South Africa) Brad Binder	KTM	1:23.932	N/A	13
15	46	(Italy) Valentino Rossi	Yamaha	1:24.127	N/A	14
16	51	(Italy) Michele Pirro	Ducati	1:24.273	N/A	15
17	73	(Spain) Álex Márquez	Honda	1:24.370	N/A	16
18	35	(United Kingdom) Cal Crutchlow	Honda	1:24.401	N/A	17
19	38	(United Kingdom) Bradley Smith	Aprilia	1:24.416	N/A	18
20	41	(Spain) Aleix Espargaró	Aprilia	1:24.429	N/A	19
21	6	(Germany) Stefan Bradl	Honda	1:24.667	N/A	20
22	53	(Spain) Tito Rabat	Ducati	1:24.916	N/A	21
OFFICIAL MOTOGP QUALIFYING Nr. 1 REPORT
OFFICIAL MOTOGP QUALIFYING Nr. 2 REPORT

Notes

- ^1 – Johann Zarco received a pit lane start penalty for his involvement in an accident with Franco Morbidelli in the Austrian motorcycle Grand Prix.

== Warm Up ==
=== MotoGP ===
The first three positions of the session are as follows.

Pos.	No.	Rider	Constructor	Warm up times
1	4	(Italy) Andrea Dovizioso	Ducati	1:24.126
2	36	(Spain) Joan Mir	Suzuki	1:24.312
3	30	(Japan) Takaaki Nakagami	Honda	1:24.353
OFFICIAL MOTOGP WARM UP REPORT

== Race ==
=== Race Report (MotoGP) ===
==== Initial Race ====
The race was run in dry conditions despite the clouds looming. On the opening lap, Joan Mir got a fantastic launch from P3 to the lead the race from polesitter Pol Espargaro, with Miller also getting a great start from fourth on the grid. The Australian got past Espargaro by going up the inside at Turn 2. After running wide and gaining an advantage at Turn 1 on the opening lap Mir was forced to drop a position, thus Miller inherited the race lead. Championship leader Fabio Quartararo made a poor start, and dropped to P14 after running wide at Turn 1. Andrea Dovizioso made a solid start and was up to sixth on Lap 2. Takaaki Nakagami got past Pol Espargaro and the top three slowly pulling clear of the chasing pack.

Lap 5 saw Mir lead the race with Miller and Nakagami half a second clear of Pol Espargaro and Alex Rins and that gap kept climbing as the race went ahead. On Lap 8 the leading trio were 1.4 clear, with the Yamahas dropping down the field. With 14 laps to go, Viñales slowed down and held his hand up to suggest something was wrong with his YZR-M1. Viñales continued but the Spaniard jumped off his Yamaha at Turn 1 in what looked like a brake failure. His machine smashed into the air-fence at Turn 1 and going up in flames. Viñales was able to walk away and brought the red flags out as the race came to a halt, with a 12-laps to go.

==== Restart ====
The race began for a second time and Mir lead from pole, with Miller falling down from third. Pol Espargaro powered away from the line well but ran slightly wide into Turn 1, allowing Miller to regain position into Turn 2. Miller was leading Mir fought back on the exit but the Ducati rider held the inside line for Turn 6, with Nakagami dropping to seventh. With eight laps to go, Pol Espargaro set the fastest lap of the race. The KTM rider then made his move on Mir at Turn 3. Pol then attempted a pass up into Turn 1 but was wide, allowing Miller to pass and Oliveira and Mir to close in. Mir was then wide at Turn 4, allowing Dovizioso to grab fourth as Miller and Oliveira . The top five were close, however Mir and Dovizioso were about to drop off the pace slightly with Doviziosio running wide again at Turn 9.

Heading onto the last lap, this was between two KTMs and a Ducati. Pol led onto the last lap and got a good run out of the first corner but braked too much defensively. This compromised his exit and Miller made the move stick into the downhill right-hander. Miller held firm through the left-handers but Pol got the run up the hill and swerved to the inside and got underneath Miller. Miller braked late and dived underneath Pol. The duo went wide though and Oliveira, on his normal line, Oliveira got past Miller and Pol to seal a historic victory. Miller held onto second to pick up his second podium of the season, with Pol claiming P3.

== Classification ==
=== MotoGP ===
The race, scheduled to be run for 28 laps, was red-flagged after 16 full laps due to an accident involving Maverick Viñales. The race was later restarted over 12 laps with the starting grid determined by the classification of the first part.

Pos.	No.	Rider	Team	Manufacturer	Laps	Time/Retired	Grid	Points
1	88	(Portugal) Miguel Oliveira	Red Bull KTM Tech3	KTM	12	16:56.025	7	25
2	43	(Australia) Jack Miller	Pramac Racing	Ducati	12	+0.316	4	20
3	44	(Spain) Pol Espargaró	Red Bull KTM Factory Racing	KTM	12	+0.540	1	16
4	36	(Spain) Joan Mir	Team Suzuki Ecstar	Suzuki	12	+0.641	3	13
5	4	(Italy) Andrea Dovizioso	Ducati Team	Ducati	12	+1.414	8	11
6	42	(Spain) Álex Rins	Team Suzuki Ecstar	Suzuki	12	+1.450	6	10
7	30	(Japan) Takaaki Nakagami	LCR Honda Idemitsu	Honda	12	+1.864	2	9
8	33	(South Africa) Brad Binder	Red Bull KTM Factory Racing	KTM	12	+4.150	13	8
9	46	(Italy) Valentino Rossi	Monster Energy Yamaha MotoGP	Yamaha	12	+4.517	14	7
10	27	(Spain) Iker Lecuona	Red Bull KTM Tech3	KTM	12	+5.068	12	6
11	9	(Italy) Danilo Petrucci	Ducati Team	Ducati	12	+5.918	11	5
12	41	(Spain) Aleix Espargaró	Aprilia Racing Team Gresini	Aprilia	12	+6.411	19	4
13	20	(France) Fabio Quartararo	Petronas Yamaha SRT	Yamaha	12	+7.406	9	3
14	5	(France) Johann Zarco	Esponsorama Racing	Ducati	12	+7.454	PL	2
15	21	(Italy) Franco Morbidelli	Petronas Yamaha SRT	Yamaha	12	+10.191	10	1
16	73	(Spain) Álex Márquez	Repsol Honda Team	Honda	12	+10.524	16	
17	35	(United Kingdom) Cal Crutchlow	LCR Honda Castrol	Honda	12	+11.447	17	
18	6	(Germany) Stefan Bradl	Repsol Honda Team	Honda	12	+11.943	20	
19	38	(United Kingdom) Bradley Smith	Aprilia Racing Team Gresini	Aprilia	12	+12.732	18	
20	51	(Italy) Michele Pirro	Pramac Racing	Ducati	12	+14.349	15	
21	53	(Spain) Tito Rabat	Esponsorama Racing	Ducati	12	+14.548	21	
Ret	12	(Spain) Maverick Viñales	Monster Energy Yamaha MotoGP	Yamaha	0	Did not restart	5	
Fastest lap: (Spain) Pol Espargaró (KTM) – 1:23.877 (lap 4)

=== Moto2 ===
Pos.	No.	Rider	Manufacturer	Laps	Time/Retired	Grid	Points
1	72	(Italy) Marco Bezzecchi	Kalex	25	37:12.461	5	25
2 (Note: 1-position penalty for exceeding track limits on the last lap.)	88	(Spain) Jorge Martín	Kalex	25	-0.060	2	20
3	87	(Australia) Remy Gardner	Kalex	25	+1.027	6	16
4	45	(Japan) Tetsuta Nagashima	Kalex	25	+1.974	3	13
5	12	(Switzerland) Thomas Lüthi	Kalex	25	+3.230	7	11
6	97	(Spain) Xavi Vierge	Kalex	25	+6.196	19	10
7	10	(Italy) Luca Marini	Kalex	25	+8.634	12	9
8	96	(United Kingdom) Jake Dixon	Kalex	25	+9.005	13	8
9	40	(Spain) Héctor Garzó	Kalex	25	+9.620	8	7
10	33	(Italy) Enea Bastianini	Kalex	25	+10.051	15	6
11	23	(Germany) Marcel Schrötter	Kalex	25	+10.238	21	5
12	16	(United States) Joe Roberts	Kalex	25	+14.857	14	4
13	11	(Italy) Nicolò Bulega	Kalex	25	+17.968	10	3
14	62	(Italy) Stefano Manzi	MV Agusta	25	+20.956	18	2
15	7	(Italy) Lorenzo Baldassarri	Kalex	25	+21.189	23	1
16	42	(Spain) Marcos Ramírez	Kalex	25	+21.497	17	
17	19	(Italy) Lorenzo Dalla Porta	Kalex	25	+26.471	24	
18	21	(Italy) Fabio Di Giannantonio	Speed Up	25	+26.952	25	
19	57	(Spain) Edgar Pons	Kalex	25	+29.400 (Note: 3-second penalty.)	20	
20	24	(Italy) Simone Corsi	MV Agusta	25	+30.859	27	
21	99	(Malaysia) Kasma Daniel	Kalex	25	+43.828	30	
22	5	(Spain) Alejandro Medina	Speed Up	25	+55.353	29	
23	27	(Indonesia) Andi Farid Izdihar	Kalex	25	+1:00.005	22	
24	64	(Netherlands) Bo Bendsneyder	NTS	25	+1:10.576 (Note: 29-second penalty.)	26	
Ret	77	(Switzerland) Dominique Aegerter	NTS	19	Mechanical	28	
Ret	37	(Spain) Augusto Fernández	Kalex	14	Accident Damage	4	
Ret	9	(Spain) Jorge Navarro	Speed Up	2	Collision	9	
Ret	35	(Thailand) Somkiat Chantra	Kalex	2	Collision	16	
Ret	44	(Spain) Arón Canet	Speed Up	1	Accident	1	
DSQ	22	(United Kingdom) Sam Lowes	Kalex	4	Black flag	11	
OFFICIAL MOTO2 RACE REPORT

- Sam Lowes was black flagged for riding in an irresponsible manner, after causing a collision with Jorge Navarro and Somkiat Chantra.

=== Moto3 ===
Pos.	No.	Rider	Manufacturer	Laps	Time/Retired	Grid	Points
1	13	(Italy) Celestino Vietti	KTM	23	37:10.319	5	25
2	14	(Italy) Tony Arbolino	Honda	23	+0.410	4	20
3	79	(Japan) Ai Ogura	Honda	23	+0.938	8	16
4	2	(Argentina) Gabriel Rodrigo	Honda	23	+1.182	1	13
5	75	(Spain) Albert Arenas	KTM	23	+1.380	9	11
6	40	(South Africa) Darryn Binder	KTM	23	+1.440	10	10
7	24	(Japan) Tatsuki Suzuki	Honda	23	+1.478	3	9
8	25	(Spain) Raúl Fernández	KTM	23	+4.265	2	8
9	82	(Italy) Stefano Nepa	KTM	23	+6.937	16	7
10	11	(Spain) Sergio García	Honda	23	+8.050	13	6
11	7	(Italy) Dennis Foggia	Honda	23	+10.660	7	5
12 (Note: 1-position penalty for irresponsible riding.)	12	(Czech Republic) Filip Salač	Honda	23	+10.341	12	4
13	16	(Italy) Andrea Migno	KTM	23	+14.381	22	3
14	5	(Spain) Jaume Masiá	Honda	23	+14.421	18	2
15	6	(Japan) Ryusei Yamanaka	Honda	23	+14.824	27	1
16	23	(Italy) Niccolò Antonelli	Honda	23	+14.961	15	
17	55	(Italy) Romano Fenati	Husqvarna	23	+16.084	21	
18	70	(Belgium) Barry Baltus	KTM	23	+17.553	30	
19	50	(Switzerland) Jason Dupasquier	KTM	23	+17.842	25	
20	21	(Spain) Alonso López	Husqvarna	23	+21.672	24	
21	99	(Spain) Carlos Tatay	KTM	23	+22.446	23	
22	92	(Japan) Yuki Kunii	Honda	23	+23.041	28	
23	9	(Italy) Davide Pizzoli	KTM	23	+27.533	26	
24	73	(Austria) Maximilian Kofler	KTM	23	+1:05.434	29	
NC	27	(Japan) Kaito Toba	KTM	23	+46.673 (Note: Not classified due to finishing the race through pits.)	17	
Ret	17	(United Kingdom) John McPhee	Honda	21	Accident	6	
Ret	71	(Japan) Ayumu Sasaki	KTM	18	Collision	19	
Ret	53	(Turkey) Deniz Öncü	KTM	18	Collision	11	
Ret	52	(Spain) Jeremy Alcoba	Honda	13	Accident	14	
Ret	54	(Italy) Riccardo Rossi	KTM	2	Accident	20	
OFFICIAL MOTO3 RACE REPORT

== Championship standings after the race ==
Below are the standings for the top five riders, constructors, and teams after the round.

=== MotoGP ===
Riders' Championship standings

	Pos.	Rider	Points
	1	(France) Fabio Quartararo	70
	2	(Italy) Andrea Dovizioso	67
4	3	(Australia) Jack Miller	56
	4	(South Africa) Brad Binder	49
2	5	(Spain) Maverick Viñales	48

Constructors' Championship standings

	Pos.	Constructor	Points
1	1	(Italy) Ducati	87
1	2	(Austria) KTM	82
1	3	(Japan) Suzuki	57
1	4	(Japan) Honda	46
4	5	(Japan) Yamaha	38 (Note: Yamaha scored 88 points as a manufacturer, but were deducted 50 points after failing to respect MSMA technical changes protocols.)

Teams' Championship standings

	Pos.	Team	Points
2	1	(Italy) Ducati Team	92
2	2	(Austria) Red Bull KTM Factory Racing	84
1	3	(Japan) Monster Energy Yamaha MotoGP	73 (Note: Monster Energy Yamaha MotoGP riders scored 93 points, but the team was deducted 20 points after failing to respect MSMA technical changes protocols.)
1	4	(Japan) Team Suzuki Ecstar	73
1	5	(Italy) Pramac Racing	69

=== Moto2 ===
Riders' Championship standings

	Pos.	Rider	Points
	1	(Italy) Luca Marini	87
	2	(Italy) Enea Bastianini	79
	3	(Spain) Jorge Martín	79
1	4	(Japan) Tetsuta Nagashima	68
2	5	(Italy) Marco Bezzecchi	65

Constructors' Championship standings

Pos.	Constructor	Points
1	(Germany) Kalex	150
2	(Italy) Speed Up	48
3	(Italy) MV Agusta	15
4	(Japan) NTS	9

Teams' Championship standings

	Pos.	Team	Points
	1	(Italy) Sky Racing Team VR46	152
	2	(Finland) Red Bull KTM Ajo	147
	3	(Belgium) EG 0,0 Marc VDS	84
	4	(Italy) Italtrans Racing Team	79
1	5	(Germany) Liqui Moly Intact GP	72

=== Moto3 ===
Riders' Championship standings

	Pos.	Rider	Points
	1	(Spain) Albert Arenas	106
1	2	(Japan) Ai Ogura	81
1	3	(United Kingdom) John McPhee	67
2	4	(Italy) Celestino Vietti	66
2	5	(Italy) Tony Arbolino	60

Constructors' Championship standings

Pos.	Constructor	Points
1	(Austria) KTM	136
2	(Japan) Honda	130
3	(Sweden) Husqvarna	17

Teams' Championship standings

	Pos.	Team	Points
	1	(Spain) Valresa Aspar Team	126
5	2	(Italy) Sky Racing Team VR46	88
2	3	(Japan) Honda Team Asia	81
1	4	(Italy) Sic58 Squadra Corse	80
3	5	(Luxembourg) Leopard Racing	78

== Notes ==
Previous race: 2020 Austrian Grand Prix	FIM Grand Prix World Championship; 2020 season	Next race: 2020 San Marino Grand Prix
Previous race: None	Styrian motorcycle Grand Prix	Next race: 2021 Styrian Grand Prix
