= Emilia-Romagna motorcycle Grand Prix =

Emilia-Romagna Grand Prix

Grand Prix motorcycle racing
- Venue: Misano World Circuit Marco Simoncelli (2020–2021, 2024)
- First race: 2020
- Last race: 2024
- Most wins (rider): Enea Bastianini (2)
- Most wins (manufacturer): Kalex (3)

The Emilia-Romagna motorcycle Grand Prix (Italian: Gran Premio motociclistico dell'Emilia-Romagna) was a motorcycling event that was introduced during the 2020 Grand Prix motorcycle racing season. In 2020 it was known as the Emilia-Romagna and Rimini Riviera motorcycle Grand Prix.

== History ==
It was retained for the 2021 season as a response to the COVID-19 pandemic.

The race made another one-off return in 2024 as a replacement for the cancelled Kazakhstan motorcycle Grand Prix.

== Official names and sponsors ==
- 2020: Gran Premio Tissot dell'Emilia Romagna e della Riviera di Rimini
- 2021: Gran Premio Nolan del Made in Italy e dell'Emilia-Romagna
- 2024: Gran Premio Pramac dell’Emilia-Romagna

== Winners ==
=== Multiple winners (riders) ===
# Wins	Rider	Wins	
# Wins	Rider	Category	Years won
2	(Italy) Enea Bastianini	MotoGP	2024
2	(Italy) Enea Bastianini	Moto2	2020

=== Multiple winners (manufacturers) ===
# Wins	Manufacturer	Wins	
# Wins	Manufacturer	Category	Years won
3	(Germany) Kalex	Moto2	2020, 2021, 2024
2	(Japan) Honda	MotoGP	2021
2	(Japan) Honda	Moto3	2021

=== By year ===
A pink background indicates an event that was not part of the Grand Prix motorcycle racing championship.

Year	Track	Moto3		Moto2		MotoGP		Report
Year	Track	Rider	Manufacturer	Rider	Manufacturer	Rider	Manufacturer	Report
2024	Misano	(Colombia) David Alonso	CFMoto	(Italy) Celestino Vietti	Kalex	(Italy) Enea Bastianini	Ducati	Report
2021	Misano	(Italy) Dennis Foggia	Honda	(United Kingdom) Sam Lowes	Kalex	(Spain) Marc Márquez	Honda	Report

Year	Track	MotoE				Moto3		Moto2		MotoGP		Report
Year	Track	Race 1		Race 2		Moto3		Moto2		MotoGP		Report
Year	Track	Rider	Manufacturer	Rider	Manufacturer	Rider	Manufacturer	Rider	Manufacturer	Rider	Manufacturer	Report
2020	Misano	(Switzerland) Dominique Aegerter	Energica	(Italy) Matteo Ferrari	Energica	(Italy) Romano Fenati	Husqvarna	(Italy) Enea Bastianini	Kalex	(Spain) Maverick Viñales	Yamaha	Report
