= 2021 FIM CEV Moto2 European Championship =

2021 FIM CEV Moto2 European Championship
Previous:	2020	Next:	2022
Support series: FIM CEV Moto3 Junior World Championship; European Talent Cup

The 2021 FIM CEV Moto2 European Championship was the twelfth CEV Moto2 season and the six under the FIM banner.

== Calendar ==
The calendar was published in November 2020. The round at Barcelona made a return for 2021.

Round	Date	Circuit	Pole position	Fastest lap	Race winner	Winning constructor	STK 600 winner
1	25 April	(Portugal) Estoril	(Germany) Lukas Tulovic	(Germany) Lukas Tulovic	(Spain) Fermín Aldeguer	(Italy) Boscoscuro	(Spain) Álex Escrig
1	25 April	(Portugal) Estoril	(Germany) Lukas Tulovic	(Spain) Alonso López	(Spain) Fermín Aldeguer	(Italy) Boscoscuro	(Spain) Álex Escrig
2	9 May	(Spain) Valencia	(Spain) Alonso López	(Spain) Fermín Aldeguer	(Spain) Fermín Aldeguer	(Italy) Boscoscuro	(Spain) Álex Escrig
3	13 June	(Spain) Barcelona	(Spain) Fermín Aldeguer	(Spain) Fermín Aldeguer	(Spain) Fermín Aldeguer	(Italy) Boscoscuro	(Spain) Álex Escrig
3	13 June	(Spain) Barcelona	(Spain) Fermín Aldeguer	(Spain) Fermín Aldeguer	(Spain) Fermín Aldeguer	(Italy) Boscoscuro	(Spain) Álex Escrig
4	4 July	(Portugal) Portimão	(Spain) Fermín Aldeguer	(Spain) Fermín Aldeguer	(Spain) Fermín Aldeguer	(Italy) Boscoscuro	(Spain) Álex Escrig
4	4 July	(Portugal) Portimão	(Spain) Fermín Aldeguer	(Spain) Fermín Aldeguer	(Spain) Fermín Aldeguer	(Italy) Boscoscuro	(Spain) Álex Escrig
5	25 July	(Spain) Aragón	(Spain) Alonso López	(Spain) Alonso López	(Spain) Fermín Aldeguer	(Italy) Boscoscuro	(Spain) Álex Escrig
5	25 July	(Spain) Aragón	(Spain) Alonso López	Race cancelled because of fatality in Talent Cup event.			
6	22 August	(Spain) Jerez	(Spain) Alonso López	(Spain) Alonso López	(Spain) Fermín Aldeguer	(Italy) Boscoscuro	(Spain) Álex Escrig
6	22 August	(Spain) Jerez	(Spain) Alonso López	(Spain) Fermín Aldeguer	(Spain) Alonso López	(Italy) Boscoscuro	(Spain) Álex Escrig
7	21 November	(Spain) Valencia	(Spain) Alonso López	(Spain) Fermín Aldeguer	(Spain) Alonso López	(Italy) Boscoscuro	(Spain) Roberto García

== Entry list ==
Team	Constructor	No.	Rider	Rounds
Moto2
(Malaysia) Liqui Moly Intact SIC Junior Team	Kalex	3	(Germany) Lukas Tulovic	All
(Malaysia) Liqui Moly Intact SIC Junior Team	Kalex	7	(Malaysia) Adam Norrodin	All
(Spain) SF Racing	Kalex	8	(Italy) Alessandro Zetti	1–4
(Spain) SF Racing	Kalex	47	(Spain) Luis Verdugo	6
(Spain) SF Racing	Kalex	71	(Italy) Christian Faraci	7
(Italy) VR46 Master Camp Team	Kalex	9	(Thailand) Keminth Kubo	All
(Italy) VR46 Master Camp Team	Kalex	25	(France) Andy Verdoïa	1–2
(Italy) VR46 Master Camp Team	Kalex	32	(Philippines) McKinley Kyle Paz	3–7
(Spain) Bultaco Racing	Bultaco	12	(Spain) Marc Luna	1
(Spain) Bultaco Racing	Bultaco	91	(Spain) Diego Pérez	6–7
(Spain) Bultaco Racing	Bultaco	99	(Spain) Óscar Gutiérrez	3
(Spain) Promoracing	Kalex	13	(Italy) Mattia Rato	All
(Spain) Promoracing	Kalex	18	(Andorra) Xavier Cardelús	All
(Spain) EasyRace Team	Kalex	16	(Spain) Aleix Viu	3
(Spain) EasyRace Team	Kalex	33	(Spain) Jeremy Bernet	1–2
(Spain) EasyRace Team	Kalex	55	(Spain) Álex Toledo	All
(Spain) EasyRace Team	Kalex	70	(Japan) Takeshi Ishizuka	1–2, 4–5
(Indonesia) Pertamina Mandalika SAG Stylobike Euvic Team	Kalex	19	(Spain) Aleix Viu	5
(Indonesia) Pertamina Mandalika SAG Stylobike Euvic Team	Kalex	20	(Indonesia) Dimas Ekky Pratama	1–4, 6–7
(Indonesia) Pertamina Mandalika SAG Stylobike Euvic Team	Kalex	74	(Poland) Piotr Biesiekirski	1–6
(Italy) Boscoscuro Talent Team-Ciatti	Boscoscuro	21	(Spain) Alonso López	All
(Italy) Boscoscuro Talent Team-Ciatti	Boscoscuro	54	(Spain) Fermín Aldeguer	All
(Spain) AGR Team	Kalex	23	(Japan) Taiga Hada	1–3, 5–7
(Spain) AGR Team	Kalex	35	(United Kingdom) Sam Wilford	All
(Netherlands) Boerboom Racing	Kalex	52	(Netherlands) Jorel Boerboom	2–7
(Belgium) Dholda Racing	Kalex	87	(Belgium) Gian Mertens	3
(United Kingdom) DAT Racing Chassis Factory	C.F.-Honda	98	(Netherlands) Tomás de Vries	2
Superstock 600
(Portugal) Leopard Galp Junior	Yamaha	4	(Portugal) Kiko Maria	1–2
(Italy) Altogoo! Racing Team	Yamaha	5	(Italy) Luca Ottaviani	7
(Spain) H43TeamNobby (Spain) H43 Escuderías	Yamaha	6	(Romania) Jacopo Hosciuc	7
(Spain) H43TeamNobby (Spain) H43 Escuderías	Yamaha	43	(Denmark) Simon Jespersen	2
(Spain) H43TeamNobby (Spain) H43 Escuderías	Yamaha	49	(Spain) Álex Pérez	3
(Spain) H43TeamNobby (Spain) H43 Escuderías	Yamaha	88	(Germany) Nicolas Czyba	1, 5–7
(Mexico) Sima Mayan Pakosta 37	Yamaha	10	(Mexico) Guillermo Moreno	1–5
(Spain) Fau55 Tey Racing	Yamaha	11	(Spain) Álex Escrig	All
(Spain) Fau55 Tey Racing	Yamaha	40	(Italy) Federico Menozzi	1–3, 5–6
(Spain) Fau55 Tey Racing	Yamaha	50	(Czech Republic) Ondřej Vostatek	All
(Spain) Fau55 Tey Racing	Yamaha	69	(Spain) Eduardo Montero	7
(Spain) AntoniBarcelona XCTech	Yamaha	14	(Japan) Daijiro Sako	3
(Spain) Avatel-Cardoso Racing	Yamaha	30	(Czech Republic) Filip Řeháček	4, 6–7
(Spain) Avatel-Cardoso Racing	Yamaha	31	(Spain) Roberto García	7
(Spain) EasyRace Team	Yamaha	34	(Spain) Carlos Torrecillas	7
(Spain) EasyRace Team	Yamaha	36	(Netherlands) Sander Kroeze	All
(Spain) EasyRace Team	Yamaha	94	(Argentina) Andrés González	6
(Spain) MDR Spaincircuits	Yamaha	42	(Croatia) Martin Vugrinec	7
(Spain) MDR Spaincircuits	Yamaha	49	(Spain) Álex Pérez	7
(Spain) Esponsorama Avintia Junior Team	Yamaha	44	(Germany) Kevin Orgis	All
(Spain) Esponsorama Avintia Junior Team	Yamaha	45	(Germany) Leon Orgis	All
(Spain) Esponsorama Avintia Junior Team	Yamaha	49	(Spain) Álex Pérez	1–2
(Spain) Fifty Motorsport	Yamaha	62	(South Africa) Jared Schultz	3
(Spain) Fifty Motorsport	Yamaha	90	(United Kingdom) Jamie Davis	7
(Spain) Dayam77 Racing Team	Yamaha	81	(Spain) Mika Pérez	1–3
(Spain) Dayam77 Racing Team	Yamaha	83	(Spain) Antonio Carpe	1–2
(South Africa) XIII Motorsports	Kawasaki	31	(South Africa) Dino Iozzo	6
Entry lists:

== Championship standings ==
Scoring system

Points were awarded to the top fifteen finishers. A rider had to finish the race to earn points.

Position	1st	2nd	3rd	4th	5th	6th	7th	8th	9th	10th	11th	12th	13th	14th	15th
Points	25	20	16	13	11	10	9	8	7	6	5	4	3	2	1

=== Riders' championship ===
Pos.	Rider	Bike	EST (Portugal)		VAL (Spain)	CAT (Spain)		POR (Portugal)		ARA (Spain)		JER (Spain)		VAL (Spain)	Points
Moto2
1	(Spain) Fermín Aldeguer	Boscoscuro	1	1	1^{F}	1^{PF}	1^{PF}	1^{PF}	1^{PF}	1	C	1	2^{F}	2^{F}	265
2	(Spain) Alonso López	Boscoscuro	2	2^{F}	2^{P}	2	2	2	3	2^{PF}	C	2^{PF}	1^{P}	1^{P}	226
3	(Germany) Lukas Tulovic	Kalex	Ret^{PF}	3^{P}	4	3	3	17	4	4	C	3	3	3	135
4	(Andorra) Xavier Cardelús	Kalex	9	13	7	4	5	4	2	Ret	C	4	4	Ret	102
5	(Malaysia) Adam Norrodin	Kalex	3	4	3	Ret	4	3	Ret	Ret	C	Ret	6	4	97
6	(United Kingdom) Sam Wilford	Kalex	8	11	10	8	9	6	6	6	C	7	8	7	90
7	(Italy) Mattia Rato	Kalex	11	7	9	10	11	5	5	13	C	10	12	13	70
8	(Japan) Taiga Hada	Kalex	6	5	Ret	WD	WD			3	C	6	5	6	68
9	(Indonesia) Dimas Ekky Pratama	Kalex	7	8	5	6	18	Ret	7			8	9	11	67
10	(Spain) Álex Toledo	Kalex	12	9	6	Ret	6	8	9	9	C	12	10	12	67
11	(Thailand) Keminth Kubo	Kalex	4	6	Ret	Ret	DNS	Ret	18	7	C	5	7	8	60
12	(Spain) Álex Escrig	Yamaha	13	10	12	11	10	9	10	12	C	11	14	10	54
13	(Poland) Piotr Biesiekirski	Kalex	5	Ret	Ret	5	Ret	WD	WD	8	C	9	11		42
14	(Italy) Alessandro Zetti	Kalex	Ret	DNS	11	9	8	10	8						34
15	(Spain) Aleix Viu	Kalex				Ret	7			5	C				20
16	(Philippines) McKinley Kyle Paz	Kalex				Ret	21	7	Ret	10	C	Ret	13	17	18
17	(France) Andy Verdoïa	Kalex	10	12	8										18
18	(Japan) Takeshi Ishizuka	Kalex	15	15	16			11	11	11	C				17
19	(Czech Republic) Ondřej Vostatek	Yamaha	18	21	17	13	12	12	12	19	C	15	16	19	16
20	(Netherlands) Sander Kroeze	Yamaha	14	22	13	DNS	DNS	15	14	14	C	14	Ret	20	12
21	(Spain) Roberto García	Yamaha												5	11
22	(Germany) Kevin Orgis	Yamaha	16	20	22	14	13	13	13	16	C	18	17	21	11
23	(Spain) Diego Pérez	Bultaco										13	Ret	9	10
24	(Germany) Leon Orgis	Yamaha	17	16	DNS	12	14	14	Ret	15	C	21	Ret	15	10
25	(Spain) Óscar Gutiérrez	Bultaco				7	Ret								9
26	(Spain) Mika Pérez	Yamaha	19	14	14	WD	WD								4
27	(Mexico) Guillermo Moreno	Yamaha	Ret	19	18	15	15	18	15	17	C				3
28	(Spain) Carlos Torrecillas	Yamaha												14	2
29	(Argentina) Andrés González	Yamaha										16	15		2
30	(Denmark) Simon Jespersen	Yamaha			15										1
Superstock 600
1	(Spain) Álex Escrig	Yamaha	1	1	1	1	1	1	1	1	C	1	1	2	270
2	(Czech Republic) Ondřej Vostatek	Yamaha	5	7	5	3	2	2	2	7	C	3	3	7	157
3	(Germany) Kevin Orgis	Yamaha	3	6	8	4	3	3	3	4	C	5	4	9	139
4	(Netherlands) Sander Kroeze	Yamaha	2	8	2	DNS	DNS	5	4	2	C	2	Ret	8	120
5	(Germany) Leon Orgis	Yamaha	4	3	DNS	2	4	4	Ret	3	C	7	Ret	4	113
6	(Mexico) Guillermo Moreno	Yamaha	Ret	5	6	5	5	7	5	5	C				74
7	(Italy) Federico Menozzi	Yamaha	9	9	10	8	8			DNQ	DNQ	8	7		53
8	(Spain) Mika Pérez	Yamaha	6	2	3	WD	WD								46
9	(Spain) Álex Pérez	Yamaha	8	Ret	7	6	6							10	43
10	(Czech Republic) Filip Řeháček	Yamaha						6	6			Ret	6	5	41
11	(Germany) Nicolas Czyba	Yamaha	DNS	DNS						6	C	6	5	6	41
12	(Argentina) Andrés González	Yamaha										4	2		33
13	(Spain) Roberto García	Yamaha												1	25
14	(Spain) Antonio Carpe	Yamaha	7	4	DNS										22
15	(South Africa) Jared Schultz	Yamaha				7	7								18
16	(Spain) Carlos Torrecillas	Yamaha												3	16
17	(Denmark) Simon Jespersen	Yamaha			4										13
18	(Portugal) Kiko Maria	Yamaha	Ret	DNS	9										7
19	(United Kingdom) Jamie Davis	Yamaha												11	5
20	(Spain) Eduardo Montero	Yamaha												12	4
21	(Italy) Luca Ottaviani	Yamaha												13	3
Pos.	Rider	Bike	EST (Portugal)		VAL (Spain)	CAT (Spain)		POR (Portugal)		ARA (Spain)		JER (Spain)		VAL (Spain)	Points

Colour	Result
Gold	Winner
Silver	Second place
Bronze	Third place
Green	Points classification
Blue	Non-points classification
Blue	Non-classified finish (NC)
Purple	Retired, not classified (Ret)
Red	Did not qualify (DNQ)
Red	Did not pre-qualify (DNPQ)
Black	Disqualified (DSQ)
White	Did not start (DNS)
White	Withdrew (WD)
White	Race cancelled (C)
Blank	Did not practice (DNP)
Blank	Did not arrive (DNA)
Blank	Excluded (EX)

P – Pole position
F – Fastest lap

=== Constructors' championship ===
Pos.	Constructor	EST (Portugal)		VAL (Spain)	CAT (Spain)		POR (Portugal)		ARA (Spain)		JER (Spain)		VAL (Spain)	Points
Moto2
1	(Italy) Boscoscuro	1	1	1	1	1	1	1	1	C	1	1	1	275
2	(Germany) Kalex	3	3	3	3	3	3	2	3	C	3	3	3	180
3	(Spain) Bultaco	DSQ	17		7	Ret					13	Ret	9	19
Superstock 600
1	(Japan) Yamaha	1	1	1	1	1	1	1	1	C	1	1	1	275
Pos.	Constructor	EST (Portugal)		VAL (Spain)	CAT (Spain)		POR (Portugal)		ARA (Spain)		JER (Spain)		VAL (Spain)	Points
