= 2020 Spanish motorcycle Grand Prix =

(Spain) 2020 Spanish Grand Prix
Race details
- Race 2 of 15 races in the 2020 Grand Prix motorcycle racing season
- Date: 19 July 2020
- Official name: Gran Premio Red Bull de España
- Location: Circuito de Jerez – Ángel Nieto; Jerez de la Frontera, Cádiz, Spain
- Course: Permanent racing facility; 4.423 km (2.748 mi)

MotoGP
Pole position
Rider	(France) Fabio Quartararo	Yamaha
Time	1:36.705	
Fastest lap
Rider	(Spain) Marc Márquez	Honda
Time	1:38.372 on lap 11	
Podium
First	(France) Fabio Quartararo	Yamaha
Second	(Spain) Maverick Viñales	Yamaha
Third	(Italy) Andrea Dovizioso	Ducati

Moto2
Pole position
Rider	(Spain) Jorge Martín	Kalex
Time	1:41.384	
Fastest lap
Rider	(Japan) Tetsuta Nagashima	Kalex
Time	1:41.995 on lap 11	
Podium
First	(Italy) Luca Marini	Kalex
Second	(Japan) Tetsuta Nagashima	Kalex
Third	(Spain) Jorge Martín	Kalex

Moto3
Pole position
Rider	(Japan) Tatsuki Suzuki	Honda
Time	1:45.465	
Fastest lap
Rider	(Spain) Sergio García	Honda
Time	1:46.165 on lap 2	
Podium
First	(Spain) Albert Arenas	KTM
Second	(Japan) Ai Ogura	Honda
Third	(Italy) Tony Arbolino	Honda

MotoE
Pole position
Rider	(Brazil) Eric Granado	Energica
Time	1:48.620	
Fastest lap
Rider	(Brazil) Eric Granado	Energica
Time	1:47.656 on lap 2	
Podium
First	(Brazil) Eric Granado	Energica
Second	(Italy) Matteo Ferrari	Energica
Third	(Switzerland) Dominique Aegerter	Energica

The 2020 Spanish motorcycle Grand Prix was the second round of the 2020 Grand Prix motorcycle racing season and the first round of the 2020 MotoGP World Championship. It was held at the Circuito de Jerez – Ángel Nieto in Jerez de la Frontera on 19 July 2020. It was initially scheduled to be held on 3 May but was moved due to the COVID-19 pandemic.

Fabio Quartararo took his first victory in the premier class, the first for a French rider since Regis Laconi at the 1999 Valencian Grand Prix, the first for a Yamaha satellite team, as well as the first non-Honda satellite rider to win a Grand Prix.

== Background ==
=== Impact of the COVID-19 pandemic ===
The originally scheduled calendar for the 2020 championship was heavily affected by the COVID-19 pandemic. Several Grands Prix were cancelled or postponed after the aborted opening round in Qatar, prompting the Fédération Internationale de Motocyclisme to draft a new calendar. The start of the championship was delayed until 19 July, with the Circuito de Jerez – Ángel Nieto hosting the Spanish Grand Prix as the opening round of the championship. Organisers of the race signed a contract with Dorna Sports, the sport's commercial rights holder, to host a second round at the circuit on 26 July (a week after the first race) to be known as the Andalusian Grand Prix. The back-to-back Spanish races would mark the first time that a country hosts back-to-back races in the same season. This would also mark the first time in the sport's history that the same venue and circuit layout would have hosted back-to-back World Championship races and the first time that a MotoGP race weekend was held behind closed doors.

=== Entrants ===
Twenty two riders representing eleven teams entered the race. Álex Márquez and Brad Binder made their competitive debuts with Repsol Honda Team and Red Bull KTM Factory Racing respectively, and Iker Lecuona started his first full season with Red Bull KTM Tech3 having previously raced for them at the 2019 Valencian Grand Prix.

== Race ==
=== MotoGP ===
Pos.	No.	Rider	Team	Manufacturer	Laps	Time/Retired	Grid	Points
1	20	(France) Fabio Quartararo	Petronas Yamaha SRT	Yamaha	25	41:23.796	1	25
2	12	(Spain) Maverick Viñales	Monster Energy Yamaha MotoGP	Yamaha	25	+4.603	2	20
3	4	(Italy) Andrea Dovizioso	Ducati Team	Ducati	25	+5.946	7	16
4	43	(Australia) Jack Miller	Pramac Racing	Ducati	25	+6.668	5	13
5	21	(Italy) Franco Morbidelli	Petronas Yamaha SRT	Yamaha	25	+6.844	8	11
6	44	(Spain) Pol Espargaró	Red Bull KTM Factory Racing	KTM	25	+6.938	6	10
7	63	(Italy) Francesco Bagnaia	Pramac Racing	Ducati	25	+13.027	4	9
8	88	(Portugal) Miguel Oliveira	Red Bull KTM Tech3	KTM	25	+13.441	15	8
9	9	(Italy) Danilo Petrucci	Ducati Team	Ducati	25	+19.651	12	7
10	30	(Japan) Takaaki Nakagami	LCR Honda Idemitsu	Honda	25	+21.553	13	6
11	5	(France) Johann Zarco	Hublot Reale Avintia Racing	Ducati	25	+25.100	18	5
12	73	(Spain) Álex Márquez	Repsol Honda Team	Honda	25	+27.350	19	4
13	33	(South Africa) Brad Binder	Red Bull KTM Factory Racing	KTM	25	+29.640	11	3
14	53	(Spain) Tito Rabat	Hublot Reale Avintia Racing	Ducati	25	+32.898	17	2
15	38	(United Kingdom) Bradley Smith	Aprilia Racing Team Gresini	Aprilia	25	+39.682	16	1
Ret	93	(Spain) Marc Márquez	Repsol Honda Team	Honda	21	Accident	3	
Ret	27	(Spain) Iker Lecuona	Red Bull KTM Tech3	KTM	19	Heat Syncope	20	
Ret	46	(Italy) Valentino Rossi	Monster Energy Yamaha MotoGP	Yamaha	18	Electronics	9	
Ret	41	(Spain) Aleix Espargaró	Aprilia Racing Team Gresini	Aprilia	2	Accident	14	
Ret	36	(Spain) Joan Mir	Team Suzuki Ecstar	Suzuki	1	Accident	10	
DNS	35	(United Kingdom) Cal Crutchlow	LCR Honda Castrol	Honda		Did not start		
DNS	42	(Spain) Álex Rins	Team Suzuki Ecstar	Suzuki		Did not start		
Fastest lap: (Spain) Marc Márquez (Honda) – 1:38.372 (lap 11)
Sources:

- Cal Crutchlow suffered a back injury in a crash during warm-up and was declared unfit to start the race.
- Álex Rins suffered a shoulder injury in a crash during qualifying and was declared unfit to start the race.

=== Moto2 ===
Pos.	No.	Rider	Manufacturer	Laps	Time/Retired	Grid	Points
1	10	(Italy) Luca Marini	Kalex	23	39:23.297	4	25
2	45	(Japan) Tetsuta Nagashima	Kalex	23	+1.271	8	20
3	88	(Spain) Jorge Martín	Kalex	23	+4.838	1	16
4	22	(United Kingdom) Sam Lowes	Kalex	23	+6.200	3	13
5	44	(Spain) Arón Canet	Speed Up	23	+10.794	6	11
6	55	(Malaysia) Hafizh Syahrin	Speed Up	23	+15.578	15	10
7	87	(Australia) Remy Gardner	Kalex	23	+17.426	12	9
8	7	(Italy) Lorenzo Baldassarri	Kalex	23	+19.416	10	8
9	33	(Italy) Enea Bastianini	Kalex	23	+19.505	11	7
10	97	(Spain) Xavi Vierge	Kalex	23	+19.590	9	6
11	62	(Italy) Stefano Manzi	MV Agusta	23	+21.269	23	5
12	40	(Spain) Héctor Garzó	Kalex	23	+21.405	14	4
13	37	(Spain) Augusto Fernández	Kalex	23	+24.550	24	3
14	11	(Italy) Nicolò Bulega	Kalex	23	+26.232	20	2
15	24	(Italy) Simone Corsi	MV Agusta	23	+27.303	21	1
16	57	(Spain) Edgar Pons	Kalex	23	+32.566	13	
17	16	(United States) Joe Roberts	Kalex	23	+33.951	16	
18	96	(United Kingdom) Jake Dixon	Kalex	23	+36.432	17	
19	19	(Italy) Lorenzo Dalla Porta	Kalex	23	+43.699	27	
20	27	(Indonesia) Andi Farid Izdihar	Kalex	23	+43.889	28	
21	2	(Switzerland) Jesko Raffin	NTS	23	+1:02.884	29	
22	99	(Malaysia) Kasma Daniel	Kalex	23	+1:09.455	30	
23	42	(Spain) Marcos Ramírez	Kalex	22	+1 lap	25	
Ret	12	(Switzerland) Thomas Lüthi	Kalex	20	Accident	19	
Ret	21	(Italy) Fabio Di Giannantonio	Speed Up	16	Handling	18	
Ret	23	(Germany) Marcel Schrötter	Kalex	7	Accident	7	
Ret	72	(Italy) Marco Bezzecchi	Kalex	6	Accident	5	
Ret	64	(Netherlands) Bo Bendsneyder	NTS	6	Accident	22	
Ret	35	(Thailand) Somkiat Chantra	Kalex	5	Accident	26	
Ret	9	(Spain) Jorge Navarro	Speed Up	0	Collision	2	
OFFICIAL MOTO2 RACE REPORT

=== Moto3 ===
Pos.	No.	Rider	Manufacturer	Laps	Time/Retired	Grid	Points
1	75	(Spain) Albert Arenas	KTM	22	39:26.256	7	25
2	79	(Japan) Ai Ogura	Honda	22	+0.340	15	20
3	14	(Italy) Tony Arbolino	Honda	22	+0.369	10	16
4	16	(Italy) Andrea Migno	KTM	22	+0.546	2	13
5	13	(Italy) Celestino Vietti	KTM	22	+0.634	5	11
6	25	(Spain) Raúl Fernández	KTM	22	+0.682	4	10
7	2	(Argentina) Gabriel Rodrigo	Honda	22	+0.753	9	9
8	24	(Japan) Tatsuki Suzuki	Honda	22	+0.881	1	8
9	23	(Italy) Niccolò Antonelli	Honda	22	+0.986	12	7
10	5	(Spain) Jaume Masiá	Honda	22	+3.646	11	6
11	71	(Japan) Ayumu Sasaki	KTM	22	+3.751	17	5
12	82	(Italy) Stefano Nepa	KTM	22	+3.936	16	4
13	55	(Italy) Romano Fenati	Husqvarna	22	+4.157	8	3
14	21	(Spain) Alonso López	Husqvarna	22	+6.086	27	2
15 (Note: 1-position penalty for exceeding track limits on the last lap.)	52	(Spain) Jeremy Alcoba	Honda	22	+5.608	6	1
16	6	(Japan) Ryusei Yamanaka	Honda	22	+6.098	25	
17	11	(Spain) Sergio García	Honda	22	+6.256	31	
18	40	(South Africa) Darryn Binder	KTM	22	+17.642	21	
19	27	(Japan) Kaito Toba	KTM	22	+28.324	13	
20	73	(Austria) Maximilian Kofler	KTM	22	+28.406	26	
21	50	(Switzerland) Jason Dupasquier	KTM	22	+28.640	28	
22	89	(Malaysia) Khairul Idham Pawi	Honda	22	+28.844	30	
23	9	(Italy) Davide Pizzoli	KTM	22	+29.026	22	
24	70	(Belgium) Barry Baltus	KTM	22	+33.352	29	
25	53	(Turkey) Deniz Öncü	KTM	22	+1:03.589	18	
Ret	17	(United Kingdom) John McPhee	Honda	21	Collision	3	
Ret	92	(Japan) Yuki Kunii	Honda	16	Handling	20	
Ret	12	(Czech Republic) Filip Salač	Honda	10	Accident Damage	14	
Ret	54	(Italy) Riccardo Rossi	KTM	7	Accident Damage	24	
Ret	7	(Italy) Dennis Foggia	Honda	0	Collision	19	
Ret	99	(Spain) Carlos Tatay	KTM	0	Collision	23	
OFFICIAL MOTO3 RACE REPORT

=== MotoE ===
Pos.	No.	Rider	Laps	Time/Retired	Grid	Points
1	51	(Brazil) Eric Granado	6	10:55.542	1	25
2	11	(Italy) Matteo Ferrari	6	+3.044	4	20
3	77	(Switzerland) Dominique Aegerter	6	+3.299	3	16
4	35	(Germany) Lukas Tulovic	6	+3.517	2	13
5	27	(Italy) Mattia Casadei	6	+4.082	10	11
6	40	(Spain) Jordi Torres	6	+4.245	8	10
7	55	(Spain) Alejandro Medina	6	+4.906	5	9
8	10	(Belgium) Xavier Siméon	6	+5.475	6	8
9	16	(Australia) Joshua Hook	6	+5.795	13	7
10	63	(France) Mike Di Meglio	6	+8.484	11	6
11	66	(Finland) Niki Tuuli	6	+8.791	9	5
12	70	(Italy) Tommaso Marcon	6	+10.301	15	4
13	7	(Italy) Niccolò Canepa	6	+10.579	17	3
14	18	(Andorra) Xavi Cardelús	6	+10.868	12	2
15	6	(Spain) María Herrera	6	+14.311	14	1
16	84	(Czech Republic) Jakub Kornfeil	6	+21.385	16	
17	15	(San Marino) Alex de Angelis	6	+26.977 (Note: 21-second penalty.)	7	
WD	61	(Italy) Alessandro Zaccone		Withdrew		
OFFICIAL MOTOE RACE REPORT

- All bikes manufactured by Energica.

== Championship standings after the race ==
Below are the standings for the top five riders, constructors, and teams after the round.

=== MotoGP ===
Riders' Championship standings

Pos.	Rider	Points
1	(France) Fabio Quartararo	25
2	(Spain) Maverick Viñales	20
3	(Italy) Andrea Dovizioso	16
4	(Australia) Jack Miller	13
5	(Italy) Franco Morbidelli	11

Constructors' Championship standings

Pos.	Constructor	Points
1	(Japan) Yamaha	25
2	(Italy) Ducati	16
3	(Austria) KTM	10
4	(Japan) Honda	6
5	(Italy) Aprilia	1

Teams' Championship standings

Pos.	Team	Points
1	(Malaysia) Petronas Yamaha SRT	36
2	(Italy) Ducati Team	23
3	(Italy) Pramac Racing	22
4	(Japan) Monster Energy Yamaha MotoGP	20
5	(Austria) Red Bull KTM Factory Racing	13

=== Moto2 ===
Riders' Championship standings

	Pos.	Rider	Points
	1	(Japan) Tetsuta Nagashima	45
	2	(Italy) Lorenzo Baldassarri	28
23	3	(Italy) Luca Marini	25
1	4	(Italy) Enea Bastianini	23
	5	(Australia) Remy Gardner	20

Constructors' Championship standings

	Pos.	Constructor	Points
	1	(Germany) Kalex	50
	2	(Italy) Speed Up	21
1	3	(Italy) MV Agusta	6
1	4	(Japan) NTS	5

Teams' Championship standings

	Pos.	Team	Points
	1	(Finland) Red Bull KTM Ajo	61
	2	(Spain) Flexbox HP40	32
8	3	(Italy) Sky Racing Team VR46	29
5	4	(Spain) Inde Aspar Team Moto2	29
2	5	(Italy) Italtrans Racing Team	23

=== Moto3 ===
Riders' Championship standings

	Pos.	Rider	Points
	1	(Spain) Albert Arenas	50
1	2	(Japan) Ai Ogura	36
1	3	(United Kingdom) John McPhee	20
	4	(Spain) Jaume Masiá	19
	5	(Japan) Tatsuki Suzuki	19

Constructors' Championship standings

Pos.	Constructor	Points
1	(Austria) KTM	50
2	(Japan) Honda	40
3	(Sweden) Husqvarna	6

Teams' Championship standings

	Pos.	Team	Points
	1	(Spain) Gaviota Aspar Team Moto3	54
3	2	(Japan) Honda Team Asia	36
1	3	(Italy) Kömmerling Gresini Moto3	29
1	4	(Luxembourg) Leopard Racing	26
1	5	(Italy) Sic58 Squadra Corse	26

=== MotoE ===
Pos.	Rider	Points
1	(Brazil) Eric Granado	25
2	(Italy) Matteo Ferrari	20
3	(Switzerland) Dominique Aegerter	16
4	(Germany) Lukas Tulovic	13
5	(Italy) Mattia Casadei	11

== Notes ==
Previous race: 2020 Qatar Grand Prix	FIM Grand Prix World Championship; 2020 season	Next race: 2020 Andalusian Grand Prix
Previous race: 2019 Spanish Grand Prix	Spanish motorcycle Grand Prix	Next race: 2021 Spanish Grand Prix
