= 2021 Algarve motorcycle Grand Prix =

(Portugal) 2021 Algarve Grand Prix
Race details
- Race 17 of 18 races in the 2021 Grand Prix motorcycle racing season
- Date: 7 November 2021
- Official name: Grande Prémio Brembo do Algarve
- Location: Autódromo Internacional do Algarve; Portimão, Algarve, Portugal
- Course: Permanent racing facility; 4.592 km (2.853 mi)

MotoGP
Pole position
Rider	(Italy) Francesco Bagnaia	Ducati
Time	1:38.725	
Fastest lap
Rider	(Italy) Francesco Bagnaia	Ducati
Time	1:39.467 on lap 5	
Podium
First	(Italy) Francesco Bagnaia	Ducati
Second	(Spain) Joan Mir	Suzuki
Third	(Australia) Jack Miller	Ducati

Moto2
Pole position
Rider	(Spain) Raúl Fernández	Kalex
Time	1:42.101	
Fastest lap
Rider	(United States) Cameron Beaubier	Kalex
Time	1:42.671 on lap 12	
Podium
First	(Australia) Remy Gardner	Kalex
Second	(Spain) Raúl Fernández	Kalex
Third	(United Kingdom) Sam Lowes	Kalex

Moto3
Pole position
Rider	(Spain) Sergio García	Gas Gas
Time	1:47.274	
Fastest lap
Rider	(Spain) Jaume Masià	KTM
Time	1:47.666 on lap 8	
Podium
First	(Spain) Pedro Acosta	KTM
Second	(Italy) Andrea Migno	Honda
Third	(Italy) Niccolò Antonelli	Honda

The 2021 Algarve motorcycle Grand Prix (officially known as the Grande Prémio Brembo do Algarve) was the seventeenth round of the 2021 Grand Prix motorcycle racing season. It was introduced as a response to the COVID-19 pandemic and was held at the Autódromo Internacional do Algarve in Portimão on 7 November 2021.

In the MotoGP class, Ducati secured its second consecutive Constructors' Championship.

In the Moto3 class, Pedro Acosta won the Riders' Championship after main title rival Dennis Foggia crashed on the last lap after being hit by Darryn Binder. Acosta became the first rookie rider to win a World Championship since Loris Capirossi who won the 125cc championship in 1990. Acosta is also the second youngest rider ever to win a world championship, just one day older than Capirossi.

== Qualifying ==
=== MotoGP ===
Fastest session lap

Pos.	No.	Biker	Constructor	Qualifying times		Final grid	Row
Pos.	No.	Biker	Constructor	Q1	Q2	Final grid	Row
1	63	(Italy) Francesco Bagnaia	Ducati	Qualified in Q2	1:38.725	1	1
2	43	(Australia) Jack Miller	Ducati	Qualified in Q2	1:38.829	2	1
3	36	(Spain) Joan Mir	Suzuki	Qualified in Q2	1:38.893	3	1
4	89	(Spain) Jorge Martín	Ducati	Qualified in Q2	1:38.916	4	2
5	5	(France) Johann Zarco	Ducati	1:39.130	1:38.918	5	2
6	44	(Spain) Pol Espargaró	Honda	Qualified in Q2	1:39.058	6	2
7	20	(France) Fabio Quartararo	Yamaha	Qualified in Q2	1:39.131	7	3
8	73	(Spain) Álex Márquez	Honda	Qualified in Q2	1:39.191	8	3
9	21	(Italy) Franco Morbidelli	Yamaha	Qualified in Q2	1:39.321	9	3
10	27	(Spain) Iker Lecuona	KTM	1:39.171	1:39.387	10	4
11	42	(Spain) Álex Rins	Suzuki	Qualified in Q2	1:39.649	11	4
12	10	(Italy) Luca Marini	Ducati	Qualified in Q2	1:39.828	12	4
13	21	(Italy) Enea Bastianini	Ducati	1:39.283	N/A	13	5
14	41	(Spain) Aleix Espargaró	Aprilia	1:39.389	N/A	14	5
15	9	(Italy) Danilo Petrucci	KTM	1:39.595	N/A	15	5
16	46	(Italy) Valentino Rossi	Yamaha	1:39.604	N/A	16	6
17	88	(Portugal) Miguel Oliveira	KTM	1:39.624	N/A	17	6
18	12	(Spain) Maverick Viñales	Aprilia	1:39.738	N/A	18	6
19	33	(South Africa) Brad Binder	KTM	1:39.859	N/A	19	7
20	6	(Germany) Stefan Bradl	Honda	1:39.907	N/A	20	7
21	4	(Italy) Andrea Dovizioso	Yamaha	1:39.918	N/A	21	7
22	30	(Japan) Takaaki Nakagami	Honda	1:40.009	N/A	22	8
OFFICIAL MOTOGP QUALIFYING RESULTS							8

== Race ==
=== MotoGP ===
The race, scheduled to be run for 25 laps, was red-flagged after 23 full laps due to an accident involving Iker Lecuona and Miguel Oliveira.

Pos.	No.	Rider	Team	Manufacturer	Laps	Time/Retired	Grid	Points
1	63	(Italy) Francesco Bagnaia	Ducati Lenovo Team	Ducati	23	38:17.720	1	25
2	36	(Spain) Joan Mir	Team Suzuki Ecstar	Suzuki	23	+2.478	3	20
3	43	(Australia) Jack Miller	Ducati Lenovo Team	Ducati	23	+6.402	2	16
4	73	(Spain) Álex Márquez	LCR Honda Castrol	Honda	23	+6.453	8	13
5	5	(France) Johann Zarco	Pramac Racing	Ducati	23	+7.882	5	11
6	44	(Spain) Pol Espargaró	Repsol Honda Team	Honda	23	+9.573	6	10
7	89	(Spain) Jorge Martín	Pramac Racing	Ducati	23	+10.144	4	9
8	42	(Spain) Álex Rins	Team Suzuki Ecstar	Suzuki	23	+10.742	11	8
9	23	(Italy) Enea Bastianini	Avintia Esponsorama	Ducati	23	+13.840	13	7
10	33	(South Africa) Brad Binder	Red Bull KTM Factory Racing	KTM	23	+14.487	19	6
11	30	(Japan) Takaaki Nakagami	LCR Honda Idemitsu	Honda	23	+20.912	22	5
12	10	(Italy) Luca Marini	Sky VR46 Avintia	Ducati	23	+22.450	12	4
13	46	(Italy) Valentino Rossi	Petronas Yamaha SRT	Yamaha	23	+22.752	16	3
14	4	(Italy) Andrea Dovizioso	Petronas Yamaha SRT	Yamaha	23	+26.207	21	2
15	6	(Germany) Stefan Bradl	Repsol Honda Team	Honda	23	+26.284	20	1
16	12	(Spain) Maverick Viñales	Aprilia Racing Team Gresini	Aprilia	23	+26.828	18	
17	21	(Italy) Franco Morbidelli	Monster Energy Yamaha MotoGP	Yamaha	23	+27.863	9	
Ret	88	(Portugal) Miguel Oliveira	Red Bull KTM Factory Racing	KTM	22	Accident	17	
Ret	27	(Spain) Iker Lecuona	Tech3 KTM Factory Racing	KTM	22	Accident	10	
Ret	20	(France) Fabio Quartararo	Monster Energy Yamaha MotoGP	Yamaha	20	Accident	7	
Ret	41	(Spain) Aleix Espargaró	Aprilia Racing Team Gresini	Aprilia	7	Accident	14	
Ret	9	(Italy) Danilo Petrucci	Tech3 KTM Factory Racing	KTM	0	Accident	15	
Fastest lap: (Italy) Francesco Bagnaia (Ducati) – 1:39.467 (lap 5)

=== Moto2 ===
Pos.	No.	Rider	Manufacturer	Laps	Time/Retired	Grid	Points
1	87	(Australia) Remy Gardner	Kalex	23	39:36.275	2	25
2	25	(Spain) Raúl Fernández	Kalex	23	+3.014	1	20
3	22	(United Kingdom) Sam Lowes	Kalex	23	+3.899	8	16
4	44	(Spain) Arón Canet	Boscoscuro	23	+7.616	4	13
5	6	(United States) Cameron Beaubier	Kalex	23	+7.621	6	11
6	13	(Italy) Celestino Vietti	Kalex	23	+10.021	14	10
7	9	(Spain) Jorge Navarro	Boscoscuro	23	+10.908	10	9
8	72	(Italy) Marco Bezzecchi	Kalex	23	+11.586	7	8
9	37	(Spain) Augusto Fernández	Kalex	23	+13.121	5	7
10	23	(Germany) Marcel Schrötter	Kalex	23	+13.286	15	6
11	21	(Italy) Fabio Di Giannantonio	Kalex	23	+14.614	3	5
12	40	(Spain) Héctor Garzó	Kalex	23	+25.538	12	4
13	62	(Italy) Stefano Manzi	Kalex	23	+26.511	17	3
14	42	(Spain) Marcos Ramírez	Kalex	23	+27.225	13	2
15	64	(Netherlands) Bo Bendsneyder	Kalex	23	+28.345	29	1
16	54	(Spain) Fermín Aldeguer	Boscoscuro	23	+28.412	28	
17	24	(Italy) Simone Corsi	MV Agusta	23	+32.282	21	
18	55	(Malaysia) Hafizh Syahrin	NTS	23	+35.387	16	
19	12	(Switzerland) Thomas Lüthi	Kalex	23	+39.184	24	
20	14	(Italy) Tony Arbolino	Kalex	23	+43.803	23	
21 (Note: 1-position penalty for exceeding track limits on the last lap.)	45	(Japan) Tetsuta Nagashima	Kalex	23	+43.432	25	
22	11	(Italy) Nicolò Bulega	Kalex	23	+43.491	27	
23	70	(Belgium) Barry Baltus	NTS	23	+45.847 (Note: 3-second penalty for exceeding track limits.)	26	
24	16	(United States) Joe Roberts	Kalex	23	+54.350	22	
25	74	(Poland) Piotr Biesiekirski	Kalex	23	+1:08.619	31	
Ret	7	(Italy) Lorenzo Baldassarri	MV Agusta	14	Tyre Vibration	30	
Ret	97	(Spain) Xavi Vierge	Kalex	10	Accident	11	
Ret	96	(United Kingdom) Jake Dixon	Kalex	9	Accident	20	
Ret	79	(Japan) Ai Ogura	Kalex	2	Accident	9	
Ret	75	(Spain) Albert Arenas	Boscoscuro	1	Accident	18	
DSQ	35	(Thailand) Somkiat Chantra	Kalex	0	Black flag	19	
OFFICIAL MOTO2 RACE REPORT

=== Moto3 ===
Pos.	No.	Rider	Manufacturer	Laps	Time/Retired	Grid	Points
1	37	(Spain) Pedro Acosta	KTM	21	38:04.339	14	25
2	16	(Italy) Andrea Migno	Honda	21	+0.354	16	20
3	23	(Italy) Niccolò Antonelli	KTM	21	+0.880	8	16
4	52	(Spain) Jeremy Alcoba	Honda	21	+1.768	11	13
5	28	(Spain) Izan Guevara	Gas Gas	21	+1.839	12	11
6	71	(Japan) Ayumu Sasaki	KTM	21	+1.874	10	10
7	55	(Italy) Romano Fenati	Husqvarna	21	+1.972	13	9
8	43	(Spain) Xavier Artigas	Honda	21	+2.333	6	8
9	24	(Japan) Tatsuki Suzuki	Honda	21	+3.423	18	7
10	12	(Czech Republic) Filip Salač	KTM	21	+6.591	9	6
11	31	(Spain) Adrián Fernández	Husqvarna	21	+6.940	3	5
12	99	(Spain) Carlos Tatay	KTM	21	+9.392	26	4
13	96	(Spain) Daniel Holgado	KTM	21	+9.930	21	3
14	66	(Australia) Joel Kelso	KTM	21	+9.996	19	2
15	67	(Italy) Alberto Surra	Honda	21	+10.416	15	1
16	82	(Italy) Stefano Nepa	KTM	21	+11.650	22	
17	20	(France) Lorenzo Fellon	Honda	21	+11.695	23	
18	54	(Italy) Riccardo Rossi	KTM	21	+11.736	20	
19	5	(Spain) Jaume Masià	KTM	21	+13.616	5	
20	92	(Japan) Yuki Kunii	Honda	21	+30.001	17	
21	6	(Japan) Ryusei Yamanaka	KTM	21	+30.183	24	
22	19	(Indonesia) Andi Farid Izdihar	Honda	21	+30.249	25	
NC	27	(Japan) Kaito Toba	KTM	13	+8 laps (Note: Not classified due to not completing enough laps.)	27	
Ret	7	(Italy) Dennis Foggia	Honda	20	Accident	4	
Ret	11	(Spain) Sergio García	Gas Gas	20	Accident	1	
Ret	17	(United Kingdom) John McPhee	Honda	4	Accident	2	
DSQ	40	(South Africa) Darryn Binder	Honda	21	+1.086 (Note: Disqualified due to irresponsible riding.)	7	
DNS	2	(Argentina) Gabriel Rodrigo	Honda		Did not start		
OFFICIAL MOTO3 RACE REPORT

- Gabriel Rodrigo withdrew from the event after Friday practice due to persistent shoulder pain.

== Championship standings after the race ==
Below are the standings for the top five riders, constructors, and teams after the round.

=== MotoGP ===
Riders' Championship standings

	Pos.	Rider	Points
	1	(France) Fabio Quartararo	267
	2	(Italy) Francesco Bagnaia	227
	3	(Spain) Joan Mir	195
1	4	(Australia) Jack Miller	165
1	5	(France) Johann Zarco	163

Constructors' Championship standings

Pos.	Constructor	Points
1	(Italy) Ducati	332
2	(Japan) Yamaha	298
3	(Japan) Suzuki	227
4	(Japan) Honda	211
5	(Austria) KTM	196

Teams' Championship standings

	Pos.	Team	Points
1	1	(Italy) Ducati Lenovo Team	392
1	2	(Japan) Monster Energy Yamaha MotoGP	364
	3	(Japan) Team Suzuki Ecstar	294
1	4	(Italy) Pramac Racing	258
1	5	(Japan) Repsol Honda Team	250

=== Moto2 ===
Riders' Championship standings

Pos.	Rider	Points
1	(Australia) Remy Gardner	305
2	(Spain) Raúl Fernández	282
3	(Italy) Marco Bezzecchi	214
4	(United Kingdom) Sam Lowes	181
5	(Spain) Augusto Fernández	158

Constructors' Championship standings

Pos.	Constructor	Points
1	(Germany) Kalex	425
2	(Italy) Boscoscuro	188
3	(Italy) MV Agusta	19
4	(Japan) NTS	10

Teams' Championship standings

Pos.	Team	Points
1	(Finland) Red Bull KTM Ajo	587
2	(Belgium) Elf Marc VDS Racing Team	339
3	(Italy) Sky Racing Team VR46	290
4	(Spain) QuieroCorredor Aspar Team	181
5	(Japan) Idemitsu Honda Team Asia	157

=== Moto3 ===
Riders' Championship standings

	Pos.	Rider	Points
	1	(Spain) Pedro Acosta	259
	2	(Italy) Dennis Foggia	213
	3	(Spain) Sergio García	168
1	4	(Italy) Romano Fenati	156
1	5	(Spain) Jaume Masiá	155

Constructors' Championship standings

Pos.	Constructor	Points
1	(Austria) KTM	353
2	(Japan) Honda	335
3	(Spain) Gas Gas	246
4	(Sweden) Husqvarna	162

Teams' Championship standings

Pos.	Team	Points
1	(Finland) Red Bull KTM Ajo	414
2	(Spain) MuchoNeumatico GasGas Aspar Team	284
3	(Luxembourg) Leopard Racing	260
4	(Malaysia) Petronas Sprinta Racing	211
5	(France) Red Bull KTM Tech3	201

== Notes ==
Previous race: 2021 Emilia Romagna Grand Prix	FIM Grand Prix World Championship; 2021 season	Next race: 2021 Valencian Grand Prix
Previous race: None	Algarve motorcycle Grand Prix	Next race: None
