= Luca Marini =

Italian motorcycle racer

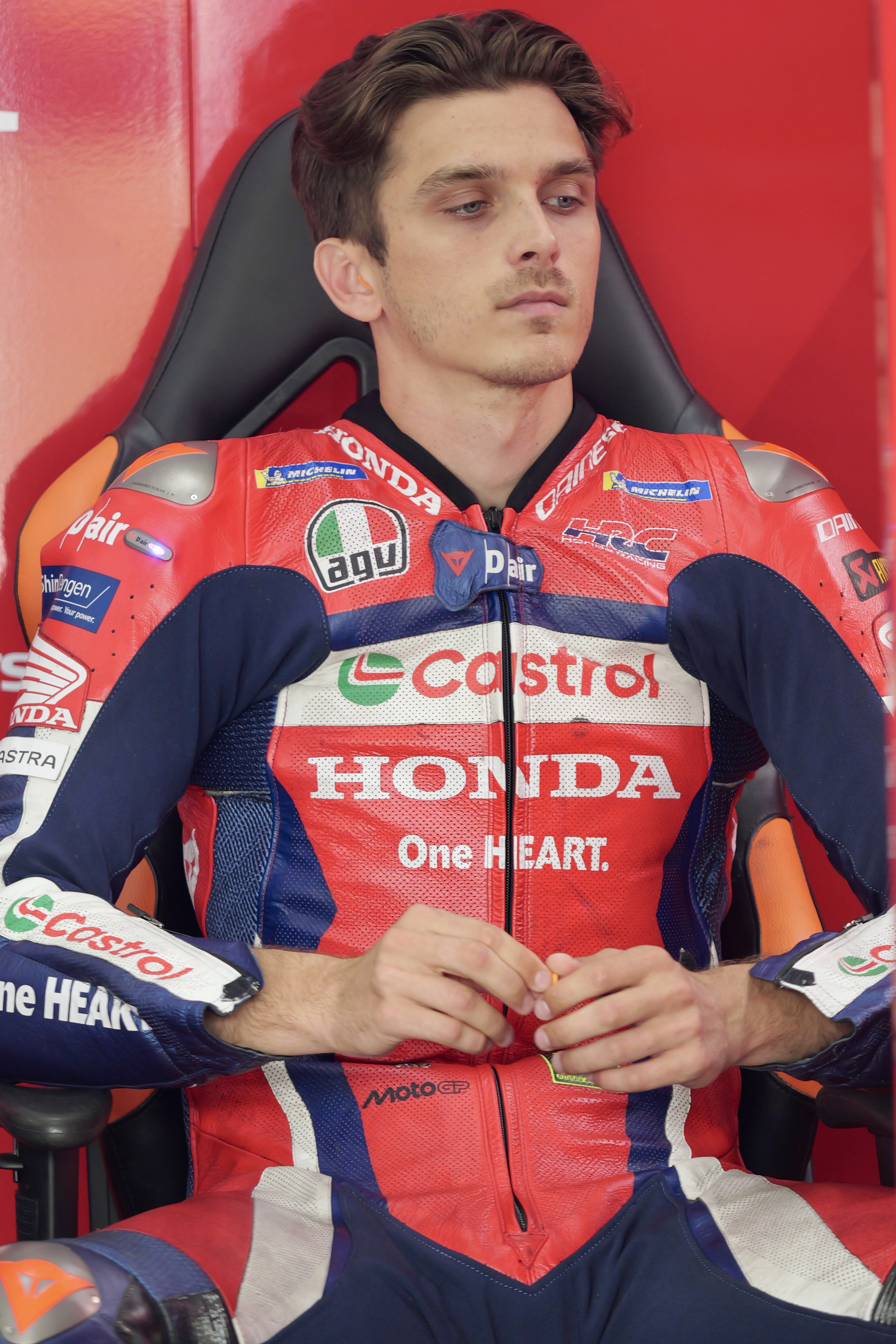
- Marini at the 2025 Malaysian Grand Prix
- Nationality: Italian
- Born: 10 August 1997 (age 29); Urbino, Italy
- Current team: Honda HRC Castrol
- Bike number: 10
Motorcycle racing career statistics
MotoGP World Championship
Active years	2021–
Manufacturers	Ducati (2021–2023); Honda (2024–)
Championships	0
2025 championship position	13th (142 pts)
Starts / Wins / Podiums / Poles / F. laps / Points; 94 / 0 / 2 / 2 / 1 / 518
Moto2 World Championship
Active years	2015–2020
Manufacturers	Kalex
Championships	0
2020 championship position	2nd (196 pts)
Starts / Wins / Podiums / Poles / F. laps / Points; 87 / 6 / 15 / 5 / 5 / 626
Moto3 World Championship
Active years	2013
Manufacturers	FTR Honda
Championships	0
2013 championship position	NC (0 pts)
Starts / Wins / Podiums / Poles / F. laps / Points; 1 / 0 / 0 / 0 / 0 / 0

Luca Marini (born 10 August 1997) is an Italian Grand Prix motorcycle racer contracted to race with Honda HRC Castrol. Marini will leave Honda at the end of the season to join Red Bull KTM Tech3 in 2027.

Marini competed for Mooney VR46 Racing Team in the 2023 MotoGP World Championship, finishing the season in eighth position. He finished as runner-up in the 2020 Moto2 World Championship. He is the maternal half-brother of Valentino Rossi. Marini was the 2011 Italian MiniGP 80 Champion.

== Career ==
=== Moto3 World Championship ===
Marini made his début in the Moto3 World Championship at the 2013 San Marino and Rimini Riviera motorcycle Grand Prix as a wildcard, failing to finish the race.

=== Moto2 World Championship ===
In 2015, Marini got another wildcard entry at the same place, this time in the Moto2 class with Pons Racing Junior Team aboard a Kalex, finishing the race in 21st place.

==== Forward Team (2016–2017) ====
===== 2016 =====
In 2016, Marini was signed by the Forward Team to compete full-time in the same class; he got his first Grand Prix points in Qatar, where he finished in tenth place, and his best result in Germany, where he had a sixth-place finish. Marini still remained with the team for the following year.

===== 2017 =====
In 2017, Marini was signed Forward Team. He finished in fourth place at the Czech Republic.

==== Sky Racing Team VR46 (2018–2020) ====
===== 2018 =====
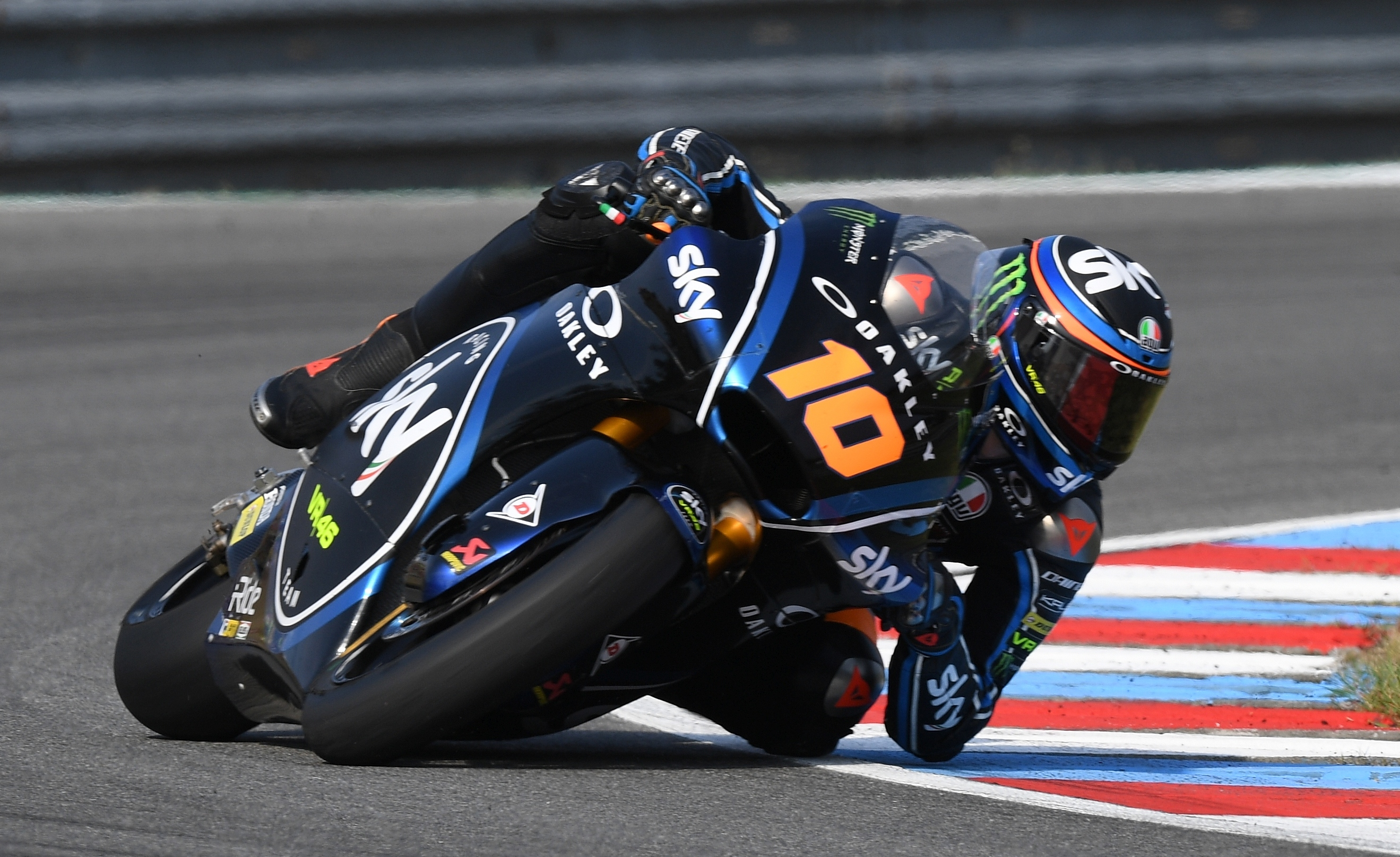
Marini at Brno in 2018

In 2018, Marini achieved his first podium in Germany and his first victory in Malaysia.

===== 2019 =====
In 2019, Marini secured two podiums in Mugello and Assen, leading to back-to-back wins at Thailand and Japan.

===== 2020 =====
In 2020, Marini became a contender for the championship title along with Enea Bastianini and Sam Lowes, the first round of the season saw Marini retire at Qatar but would clinch his first win at the second round at the Spanish Grand Prix and claim a second-place finish in the second Jerez round (the Andalusian GP), with more point scoring finishes at Brno (fourth place) and another second-place finish at the Austrian Grand Prix and a point finish in Styria before claiming his second win and a fourth place respectively at the two Misano rounds before adding a third win at Catalunya.

Marini finished the French Grand Prix outside the points in 18th and at the first Aragon round he highsided off his bike and retired from the race with Lowes taking first place in the next three rounds with Marini finishing the same three rounds (Teruel, Europe, and Valencia) in 11th, sixth and fifth place respectively and finishing second in Portugal behind Remy Gardner who would claimed his first win.

Marini finished the 2020 Moto2 season as the championship runner up with 196 points with over three wins and three second place finishes which put Marini ahead of Lowes who had scored exactly the same points as Marini but Lowes claimed third and Marini second at the final race which meant that Marini was ahead of Lowes on countback, with Bastianini being nine points ahead of both of them.

=== MotoGP World Championship ===
==== Sky VR46 Avintia (2021) ====
For 2021, Marini moved to the MotoGP class joining the Esponsorama Avintia team along with 2020 Moto2 Champion Enea Bastianini, Marini however would use the Sky VR46 livery on his bike while Bastianini would use the Avintia livery.

For the first two rounds of his rookie season at Qatar, Marini ended up finishing 16th and 18th respectively while his teammate Bastianini finished tenth and 11th in the first two rounds. Portimao saw improvement for Marini as he managed to make it into Q2 of Qualifying through free practice and started eighth on the grid, he finished the race in 12th place.

==== Mooney VR46 Racing Team (2022–2023) ====
For 2022, Marini was confirmed to be staying in the premier class, partnering his 2020 teammate at Mooney VR46 Racing Team, Marco Bezzecchi.

For 2023, Marini finished the season for Mooney VR46 Racing Team in eighth place. He took his first premier class podium at Austin, and his first pole position at the Indonesian Grand Prix. A standout performance at the Qatar Grand Prix with pole position and third place finishes in both the sprint and feature race was his last podium as a Ducati rider.

==== Honda Factory Team (2024–2026) ====
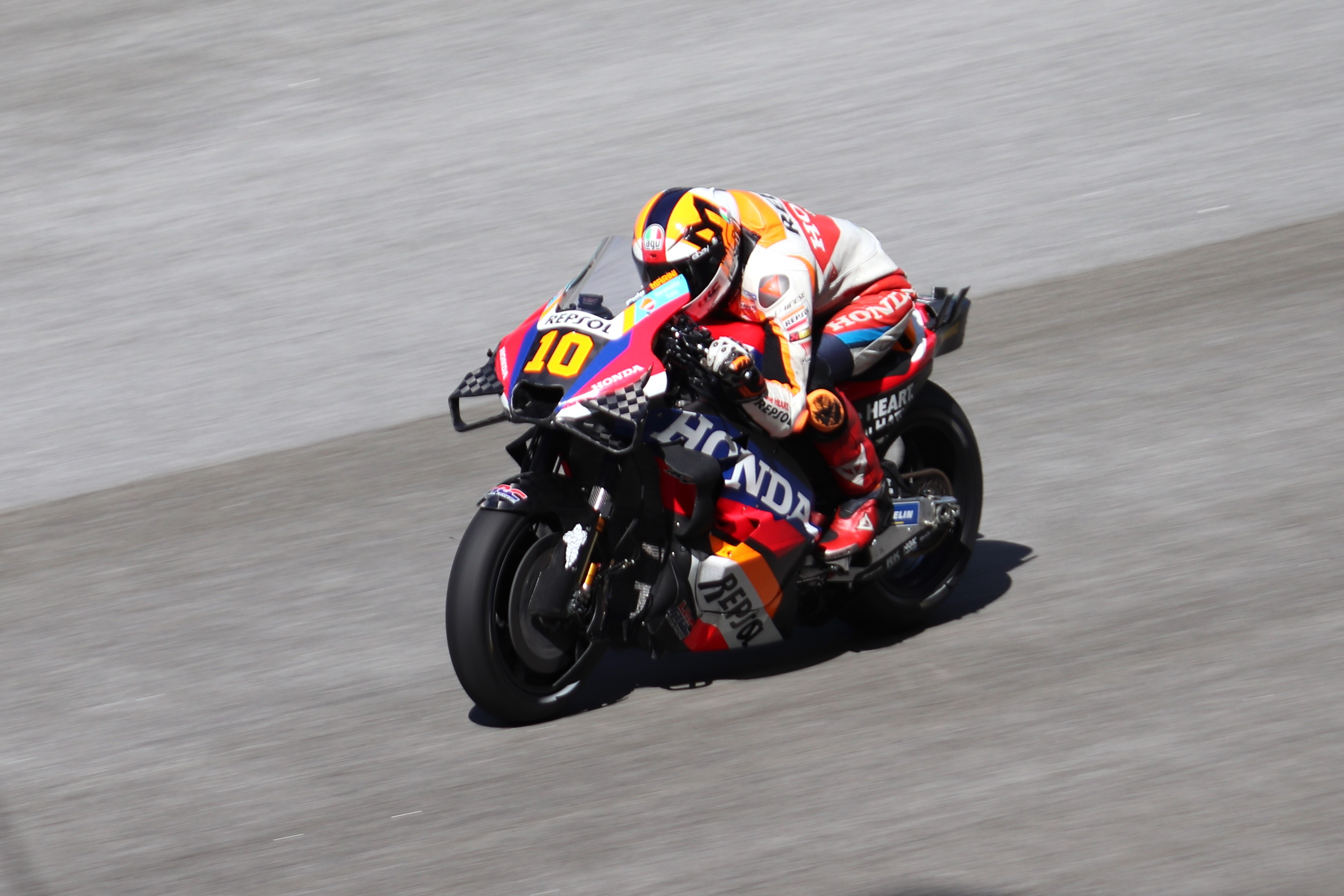
Marini at the 2024 Malaysian Grand Prix

Marini initially signed one year extension with the VR46 team, however rumors began circulating the paddock about Marini being linked to a vacant seat at the Repsol Honda team left by the 8-time world champion, Marc Márquez. The VR46 team subsequently confirmed Marini's departure, with Honda confirming the signing of Marini two days later.

Marini had a successful start to his 2025 campaign, scoring points in the first seven races with a best finish of eighth at the Circuit of the Americas. However, after successfully undergoing the first day of testing the Suzuka 8 Hours at the Suzuka circuit, Marini had a serious crash on the second day of testing or on 28 May 2025. The Honda factory team rider suffered a dislocated left hip, ligament injury in the left knee, fractures of the sternum and left collarbone, and a right-sided pneumothorax. The Italian rider was immediately taken to a local hospital and but was in stable condition. Spending the next three races absent due to recovering from his injuries, Marini made his return at the German Grand Prix with a remarkable sixth place finish in the main race. His best weekend with the team came a few races later at the Hungarian Grand Prix, where he earned a best finish of fourth in the sprint before coming home fifth in the main race. After two more top-ten finishes in Catalunya and Misano, a clutch problem on the opening lap saw Marini suffer his first race retirement of the year in Japan.

Marini continued with Honda for the 2026 season alongside Mir. After suffering from a lack of strength during opening practice of the Australian Grand Prix, he withdrew from the remainder of the weekend owing to a viral infection. He made his return just a week later during the Malaysian Grand Prix.

==== Red Bull KTM Tech3 (2027–) ====
Marini is set to switch to Red Bull KTM Tech3 in 2027 on a two-year contract.

== Career statistics ==
=== FIM CEV Moto3 Junior World Championship ===
==== Races by year ====
(key) (Races in bold indicate pole position, races in italics indicate fastest lap)

Year	Bike	1	2	3	4	5	6	7	8	9	10	11	Pos	Pts
2013	FTR Honda	CAT1	CAT2	ARA	ALB1	ALB2; 7	NAV	VAL1	VAL1	JER; 14			25th	11
2014	Kalex KTM	JER1; Ret	JER2; 14	LMS; 10	ARA; 15	CAT1; 15	CAT2; 16	ALB; 10	NAV; Ret	ALG; 18	VAL1; 8	VAL1; 8	16th	32

=== FIM CEV Moto2 European Championship ===
==== Races by year ====
(key) (Races in bold indicate pole position, races in italics indicate fastest lap)

Year	Bike	1	2	3	4	5	6	7	8	9	10	11	Pos	Pts
2015	Kalex	ALG1; 5	ALG2; 4	CAT; 2	ARA1; Ret	ARA2; 7	ALB; 4	NAV1; 4	NAV2; 4	JER; 4	VAL1; Ret	VAL2; 6	5th	115

=== Grand Prix motorcycle racing ===
==== By season ====
Season	Class	Motorcycle	Team	Race	Win	Podium	Pole	FLap	Pts	Plcd
2013	Moto3	FTR Honda	Twelve Racing	1	0	0	0	0	0	NC
2015	Moto2	Kalex	Pons Racing Junior Team	1	0	0	0	0	0	NC
2016	Moto2	Kalex	Forward Racing Team	18	0	0	0	1	34	23rd
2017	Moto2	Kalex	Forward Racing Team	16	0	0	0	0	59	15th
2018	Moto2	Kalex	Sky Racing Team VR46	18	1	5	2	1	147	7th
2019	Moto2	Kalex	Sky Racing Team VR46	19	2	4	1	2	190	6th
2020	Moto2	Kalex	Sky Racing Team VR46	15	3	6	2	1	196	**2nd**
2021	MotoGP	Ducati	Sky VR46 Avintia	18	0	0	0	0	41	19th
2022	MotoGP	Ducati	Mooney VR46 Racing Team	20	0	0	0	1	120	12th
2023	MotoGP	Ducati	Mooney VR46 Racing Team	18	0	2	2	0	201	8th
2024	MotoGP	Honda	Repsol Honda Team	19	0	0	0	0	14	22nd
2025	MotoGP	Honda	Honda HRC Castrol	19	0	0	0	0	142	13th
2026	MotoGP	Honda	Honda HRC Castrol	6	0	0	0	0	43	11th*
Total				**188**	**6**	**17**	**7**	**6**	**1187**	

==== By class ====
Class	Seasons	1st GP	1st pod	1st win	Race	Win	Podiums	Pole	FLap	Pts	WChmp
Moto3	2013	2013 San Marino			1	0	0	0	0	0	0
Moto2	2015–2020	2015 San Marino	2018 Germany	2018 Malaysia	87	6	15	5	5	626	0
MotoGP	2021–present	2021 Qatar	2023 Americas		100	0	2	2	1	561	0
Total	2013, 2015–present				**188**	**6**	**17**	**7**	**6**	**1187**	**0**

==== Races by year ====
(key) (Races in bold indicate pole position; races in italics indicate fastest lap; ^{superscript} indicates point-scoring sprint position)

Year	Class	Bike	1	2	3	4	5	6	7	8	9	10	11	12	13	14	15	16	17	18	19	20	21	22	Pos	Pts
2013	Moto3	FTR Honda	QAT	AME	SPA	FRA	ITA	CAT	NED	GER	IND	CZE	GBR	RSM; Ret	ARA	MAL	AUS	JPN	VAL						NC	0
2015	Moto2	Kalex	QAT	AME	ARG	SPA	FRA	ITA	CAT	NED	GER	IND	CZE	GBR	RSM; 21	ARA	JPN	AUS	MAL	VAL					NC	0
2016	Moto2	Kalex	QAT; 10	ARG; 18	AME; Ret	SPA; 16	FRA; 12	ITA; Ret	CAT; Ret	NED; Ret	GER; 6	AUT; 17	CZE; Ret	GBR; Ret	RSM; 13	ARA; 25	JPN; 12	AUS; 16	MAL; 9	VAL; 22					23rd	34
2017	Moto2	Kalex	QAT; 6	ARG; 12	AME; 10	SPA; 5	FRA; Ret	ITA; 6	CAT; DNS	NED; Ret	GER; DNS	CZE; 4	AUT; Ret	GBR; 11	RSM; Ret	ARA; Ret	JPN; Ret	AUS; 23	MAL; Ret	VAL; 23					15th	59
2018	Moto2	Kalex	QAT; 9	ARG; 16	AME; 13	SPA; Ret	FRA; Ret	ITA; 7	CAT; 17	NED; 8	GER; 3	**CZE**; 2	AUT; 3	GBR; C	RSM; Ret	ARA; 11	THA; 2	JPN; 9	AUS; 5	MAL; 1	**VAL**; Ret				7th	147
2019	Moto2	Kalex	QAT; 8	ARG; 7	AME; 6	SPA; 8	FRA; 13	ITA; 2	CAT; 6	NED; 3	GER; 10	CZE; 5	AUT; Ret	GBR; 9	RSM; 11	ARA; 4	THA; 1	**JPN**; 1	AUS; Ret	MAL; 10	VAL; 8				6th	190
2020	Moto2	Kalex	QAT; Ret	SPA; 1	ANC; 2	CZE; 4	AUT; 2	STY; 7	RSM; 1	**EMI**; 4	**CAT**; 1	FRA; 17	ARA; Ret	TER; 11	EUR; 6	VAL; 5	POR; 2								2nd	196
2021	MotoGP	Ducati	QAT; 16	DOH; 18	POR; 12	SPA; 15	FRA; 12	ITA; 17	CAT; 12	GER; 15	NED; 18	STY; 14	AUT; 5	GBR; 15	ARA; 20	RSM; 19	AME; 14	EMI; 9	ALR; 12	VAL; 17					19th	41
2022	MotoGP	Ducati	QAT; 13	INA; 14	ARG; 11	AME; 17	POR; 12	SPA; 16	FRA; 9	ITA; 6	CAT; 6	GER; 5	NED; 17	GBR; 12	AUT; 4	RSM; 4	ARA; 7	JPN; 6	THA; 23	AUS; 6	MAL; Ret	VAL; 7			12th	120
2023	MotoGP	Ducati	POR; Ret	ARG; 8^{3}	AME; 2^{7}	SPA; 6	FRA; Ret^{4}	ITA; 4^{5}	GER; 5^{4}	NED; 7	GBR; 7	AUT; 4	CAT; 11	RSM; 9^{7}	IND; DNS	JPN	**INA**; Ret^{2}	AUS; 12	THA; 7^{3}	MAL; 10^{9}	**QAT**; 3^{3}	VAL; 9			8th	201
2024	MotoGP	Honda	QAT; 20	POR; 17	AME; 16	SPA; 17	FRA; 16	CAT; 17	ITA; 20	NED; 17	GER; 15	GBR; 17	AUT; Ret	ARA; 17	RSM; DNS	EMI; 12	INA; Ret	JPN; 14	AUS; 14	THA; 12	MAL; 15	SLD; 16			22nd	14
2025	MotoGP	Honda	THA; 12	ARG; 10	AME; 8^{8}	QAT; 10	SPA; 10	FRA; 11	GBR; 15	ARA	ITA	NED	GER; 6	CZE; 12	AUT; 13	HUN; 5^{4}	CAT; 8^{8}	RSM; 7^{7}	JPN; Ret^{7}	INA; 5	AUS; 6^{8}	MAL; 8	POR; 11	VAL; 7	13th	142
2026	MotoGP	Honda	THA; 10	BRA; 11	USA; 9^{5}	SPA; 13^{9}	FRA; 10	CAT; 6	ITA; 13	HUN; 5	CZE; 8	NED; 10	GER; 8	GBR; 9	ARA; 14	RSM; 9^{9}	AUT; 14	JPN; 10	INA; 12	AUS	MAL	QAT	POR	VAL	12th*	108*

* Season still in progress.
