= Franco Morbidelli =

Italian motorcycle racer (born 1994)

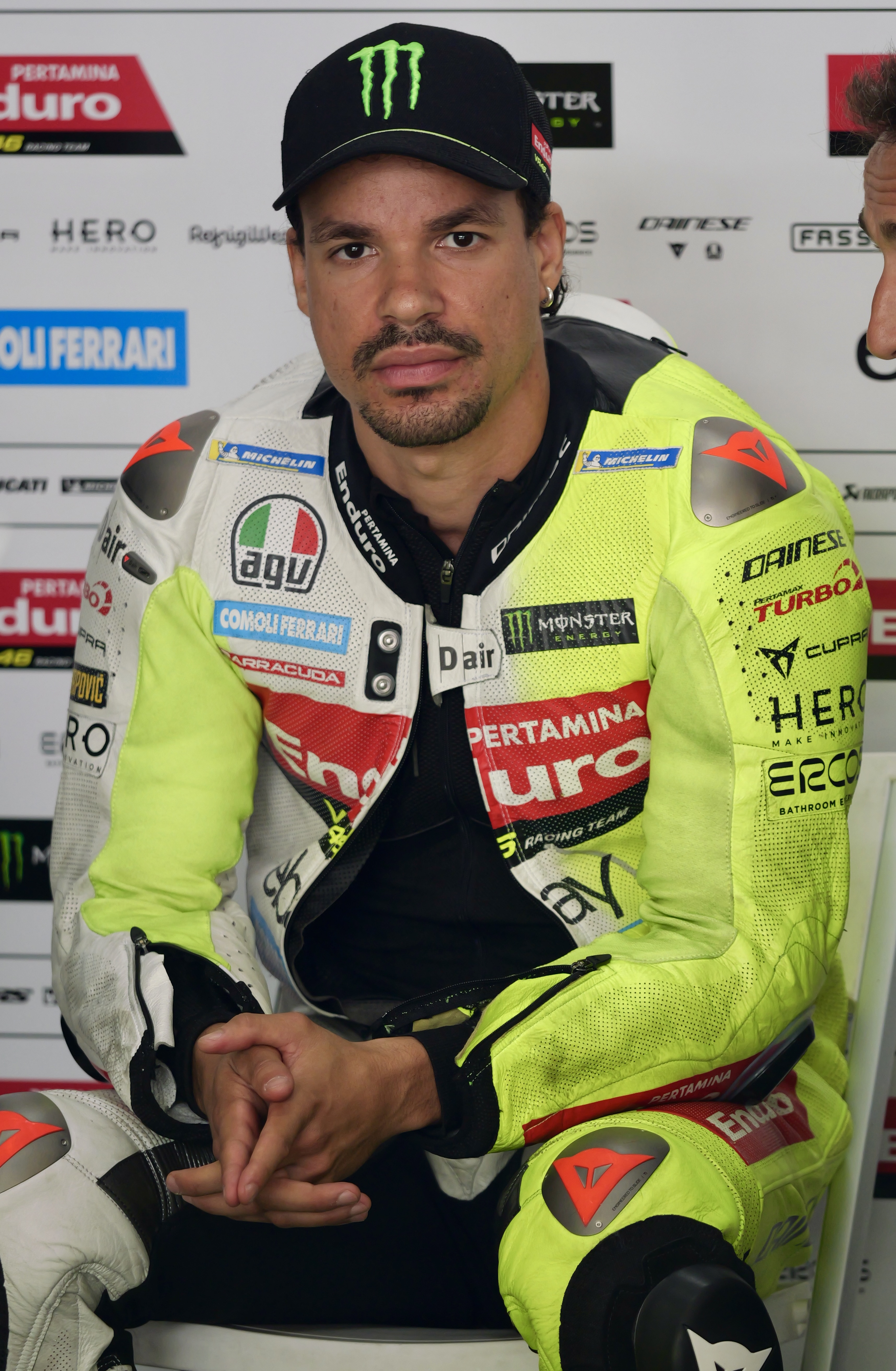
- Morbidelli at the 2025 Malaysian Grand Prix
- Nationality: Italian
- Born: 4 December 1994 (age 31); Rome, Italy
- Current team: Pertamina Enduro VR46 Racing Team
- Bike number: 21
Motorcycle racing career statistics
MotoGP World Championship
| Active years | 2018– |
| Manufacturers | Honda (2018); Yamaha (2019–2023); Ducati (2024–) |
| Championships | 0 |
| 2025 championship position | 7th (231 pts) |
Starts / Wins / Podiums / Poles / F. laps / Points; 142 / 3 / 8 / 2 / 2 / 918
Moto2 World Championship
| Active years | 2013–2017 |
| Manufacturers | Suter (2013); Kalex (2014–2017) |
| Championships | 1 (2017) |
| 2017 championship position | 1st (308 pts) |
Starts / Wins / Podiums / Poles / F. laps / Points; 71 / 8 / 21 / 6 / 13 / 686

Franco Morbidelli (born 4 December 1994) is an Italian Grand Prix motorcycle racer in MotoGP class, riding for Pertamina Enduro VR46 Racing Team team. He became champion in the 2013 European Superstock 600 Championship, and the 2017 Moto2 World Championship.

Morbidelli is set to leave the VR46 Racing Team at the end of the 2026 season.

== Early life ==
Franco Morbidelli was born in Rome to a Brazilian mother, Cristina, and an Italian father, Livio Morbidelli, the latter of whom is a former motorcycle racer, finishing runner-up in the 80 cc and 125 cc classes of the Italian national championships. Livio recognized his son's potential from a young age but did not have the resources to support a racing career. Through an old racing companion Graziano Rossi, father of nine-time world champion Valentino Rossi, Livio Morbidelli learned of the motorcycle training hotbed in Tavullia. The family sold their home in Rome and moved to Tavullia to support Franco's race career ambitions. This training with Rossi became the precursor to what is now known as the VR46 Academy for racers, of which Morbidelli later became the first official member. Despite the common misconception, he is not related to Giancarlo Morbidelli, manufacturer of the Morbidelli Grand Prix racing bikes, or his son, former Italian F1 driver Gianni Morbidelli. In January 2013, Morbidelli's father committed suicide.

== Career ==
=== Early career ===
As a teen, Morbidelli was poised to enter the Spanish CEV 125cc championship, one of the main feeder series for a Grand Prix motorcycle career. However, a lack of funding prevented him from entering, and he instead found a ride in the European Superstock 600 championship for 2011. Staying in the series for 2012, and 2013, Morbidelli got seat at Team Italia aboard a Kawasaki, for a third season in the class in 2013, ultimately winning the championship with two wins and three second places.

=== Moto2 World Championship ===
==== Federal Oil Gresini Moto2 (2013) ====
As a result of his success in the Superstock championship, Morbidelli earned a place as a wild-card entry rider for Gresini in three rounds of the Moto2 championship. He did not score any points in the three races, finishing 20th in Misano, 18th in Japan, and 17th in Valencia.

==== Italtrans Racing Team (2014–2015) ====
Morbidelli joined the Moto2 class full-time in 2014 with the Italtrans Racing Team, and outscored his more experienced teammate and former 125cc Champion Julián Simón, finishing with 75 points compared to Simón's 56. He stayed with the team in 2015, and got his first podium, a third place finish, at the Indianapolis Grand Prix. He ended the season tenth in the standings, with 90 points.

==== EG 0,0 Marc VDS (2016–2017) ====
In 2016, Morbidelli joined the Marc VDS Racing Team, partnering Álex Márquez. After a slow start, he finished the season strongly with five consecutive podium finishes, eight podiums in total (four second places, and four third places), and finished fourth in the standings, with 213 points. For 2017, he was a favourite for the title and took his first win at the opening race at Qatar accordingly. He won a total of eight races during the season, with an additional four podium finishes, as he won the 2017 Moto2 World Championship with Marc VDS in the Malaysian GP, after his closest championship contender Thomas Lüthi was declared unfit for the Malaysian race, following a crash at qualifying.

=== MotoGP World Championship (2018–2026) ===
==== EG 0,0 Marc VDS (2018) ====
Morbidelli moved up the MotoGP class in 2018, still with the Marc VDS team on a Honda bike, the 2017-spec Honda RC213V. He was partnered by his 2017 Moto2 title rival Thomas Lüthi, who failed to score a single point that season, on the same machinery. Morbidelli finished the season in 15th place with 50 points, four points ahead of Hafizh Syahrin on the Tech3 Yamaha, thus winning rookie of the year.

==== Petronas Yamaha SRT (2019–2021) ====
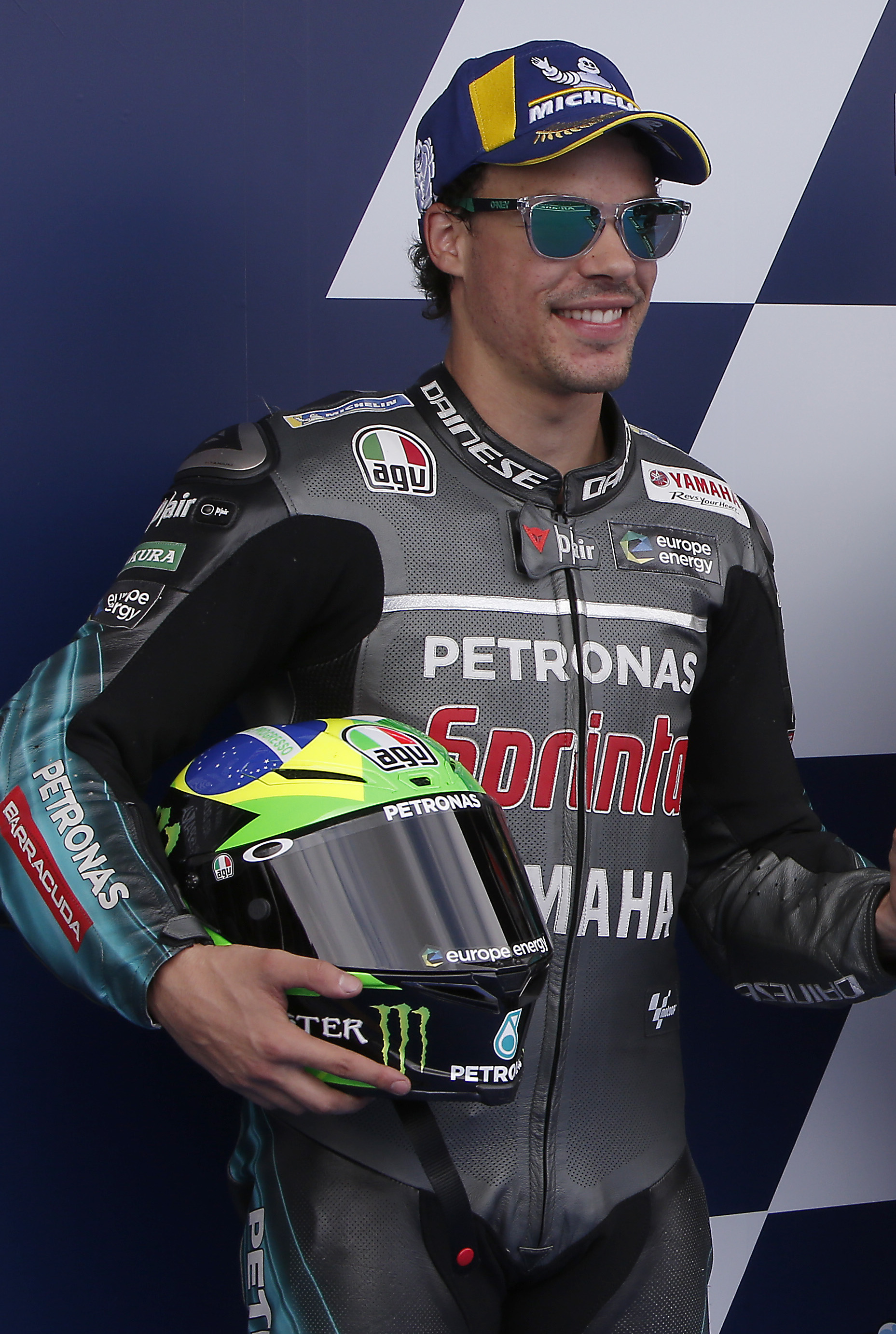
Morbidelli in 2019

For 2019, as Marc VDS left the premier class, Morbidelli signed with the newly formed Petronas SRT team on a two-year deal to ride an "A-spec" satellite Yamaha alongside rookie Fabio Quartararo. With 115 points, he finished tenth in the riders' championship, finishing in the top ten point scoring places regularly.

Just before the delayed start to the 2020 season, Petronas SRT announced that Morbidelli had been signed on a further two-year deal, meaning he would stay with the team. In this season, Morbidelli was riding a 2019-spec Yamaha, while his team-mate Fabio Quartararo, rode a factory-spec Yamaha. In August 2020, at the Austrian Grand Prix, Morbidelli's motorcycle collided with that of Johann Zarco while the two fought through turn 2. Despite the dramatic crash which resulted in a red flag, Morbidelli was unharmed. He achieved his first MotoGP podium at the Czech round and his first victory just three races later, at his home race in Rimini. He took his second career win at the Teruel Grand Prix, setting a new track race lap record on the way, and solidifying himself as a contender for the riders' championship. At the following European Grand Prix, Morbidelli struggled in qualifying and then in the race, battling rising tire pressures, ultimately limping home in 11th, while title rival Joan Mir took his first career win, all but extinguishing Morbidelli's title hopes. At the second Valencia round the following week, Morbidelli bounced back to take his second career pole position and converted it to his third career win, staving off a last lap attack from Jack Miller. Mir finished in seventh place, sufficient to clinch the championship ahead of Morbidelli. At the final round in Portugal, Morbidelli finished the season with his fifth podium of the season, to end the championship as runner-up to Mir by 13 points.

For 2021, Morbidelli's teammate was the VR46 Academy owner Valentino Rossi. During the first half season, Morbidelli rode the 2020 "A-spec" Yamaha and took his first podium at Jerez, finishing third. After the German Grand Prix, Morbidelli injured his knee in a training accident and was unable to race at Assen when he was substituted by Yamaha World Superbike rider Garrett Gerloff, and the Styrian event in Austria by Yamaha factory tester Cal Crutchlow. Morbidelli's recovery was slow and he was replaced by Jake Dixon who rode Morbidelli's machine for the British Grand Prix race in August, and again at Aragón in September.

==== Monster Energy Yamaha MotoGP (2021–2023) ====
During Morbidelli's rehabilitation, it was announced that he would move up to the factory Yamaha Motor Racing team for the rest of 2021 (starting from Misano), and also through 2022, officially replacing the vacated seat left by Maverick Viñales who was abruptly sacked by the team in August 2021. Morbidelli’s seat at the satellite Yamaha team was taken over by Andrea Dovizioso, who returned to the sport after a racing break and some test riding with Aprilia. After Morbidelli was deemed healthy enough to race by doctors, he returned to the championship on an unfamiliar bike, after missing five race weekends. This showed in his results, finishing in the points just twice in the season's last five races, ending the year 17th in the standings, with 47 points. For the 2022 MotoGP World Championship, Morbidelli was partnered by old teammate, the reigning World Champion Fabio Quartararo at the Yamaha Motor Racing team.

==== Prima Pramac Racing (2024) ====
Morbidelli officially joined Pramac Ducati starting the 2024 season. He will accompany Jorge Martín at this team who uses the latest Ducati motorbike. Meanwhile, his position at Monster Energy Yamaha is known to have been replaced by Álex Rins. The certainty of Morbidelli's move to Pramac Ducati was also confirmed after Marco Bezzecchi's refusal to move to Pramac. In a season largely marked by his adaption to the Ducati, Morbidelli finished the 2024 campaign in ninth place, whilst taking his first sprint race podium at the San Marino Grand Prix.

==== VR46 Racing Team (2025–2026) ====
For the 2025 season, Morbidelli moved to the Pertamina Enduro VR46 Racing Team, still riding with the Ducati Desmosedici GP24, where he partners Fabio Di Giannantonio.

Morbidelli remained with the VR46 Racing Team alongside Di Giannantonio for the 2026 season.

Morbidelli is set to leave VR46 Racing Team at the end of 2026 season.

== Career statistics ==
=== FIM European Superstock 600 Championship ===
==== By season ====
| Season | Class | Motorcycle | Team | Race | Win | Podium | Pole | FLap | Pts | Plcd |
|---|---|---|---|---|---|---|---|---|---|---|
| 2011 | European; Superstock; 600 | Yamaha; YZF-R6 | Forwards S.A. Forwards Racing Jr. Team | 4 | 0 | 0 | 0 | 0 | 32 | 17th |
| 2012 | European; Superstock; 600 | Yamaha; YZF-R6 | Bike Service Racing Team | 8 | 0 | 1 | 1 | 0 | 74 | 6th |
| 2012 | European; Superstock; 600 | Yamaha; YZF-R6 | RCGM Team | 8 | 0 | 1 | 1 | 0 | 74 | 6th |
| 2013 | European; Superstock; 600 | Kawasaki; Ninja ZX-6R | San Carlo Team Italia | 10 | 2 | 5 | 2 | 1 | 154 | **1st** |
| Total | | | | **22** | **2** | **6** | **3** | **1** | **260** | |

==== By class ====
| Class | Seasons | 1st GP | 1st pod | 1st win | Race | Win | Podiums | Pole | FLap | Pts | Chmp |
|---|---|---|---|---|---|---|---|---|---|---|---|
| European Superstock 600 | 2011–2013 | 2011 Monza | 2012 Nürburgring | 2013 Portimão | 22 | 2 | 6 | 3 | 1 | 260 | 1 |
| Total | 2011–2013 | | | | **22** | **2** | **6** | **3** | **1** | **260** | **1** |

==== Races by year ====
(key) (Races in bold indicate pole position, races in italics indicate fastest lap)

| Year | Bike | 1 | 2 | 3 | 4 | 5 | 6 | 7 | 8 | 9 | 10 | Pos | Pts |
|---|---|---|---|---|---|---|---|---|---|---|---|---|---|
| 2011 | Yamaha | ASS | MNZ; 4 | MIS; Ret | ARA | BRN | SIL | NÜR | IMO; 6 | MAG | POR; 7 | 17th | 32 |
| 2012 | Yamaha | IMO; 7 | ASS | MNZ; 9 | **MIS**; 15 | ARA | BRN; 6 | SIL; 7 | NÜR; 3 | POR; 5 | MAG; 5 | 6th | 74 |
| 2013 | Kawasaki | ARA; 6 | ASS; 7 | MNZ; 6 | POR; 1 | **IMO**; 2 | SIL1; 4 | SIL2; 14 | NÜR; 1 | MAG; 2 | **JER**; 2 | 1st | 154 |

=== Grand Prix motorcycle racing ===
==== By season ====
| Season | Class | Motorcycle | Team | Race | Win | Podium | Pole | FLap | Pts | Plcd | WCh |
|---|---|---|---|---|---|---|---|---|---|---|---|
| 2013 | Moto2 | Suter | Federal Oil Gresini Moto2 | 3 | 0 | 0 | 0 | 0 | 0 | NC | – |
| 2014 | Moto2 | Kalex | Italtrans Racing Team | 18 | 0 | 0 | 0 | 0 | 75 | 11th | – |
| 2015 | Moto2 | Kalex | Italtrans Racing Team | 14 | 0 | 1 | 0 | 2 | 90 | 10th | – |
| 2016 | Moto2 | Kalex | EG 0,0 Marc VDS | 18 | 0 | 8 | 0 | 3 | 213 | 4th | – |
| 2017 | Moto2 | Kalex | EG 0,0 Marc VDS | 18 | 8 | 12 | 6 | 8 | 308 | **1st** | 1 |
| 2018 | MotoGP | Honda | EG 0,0 Marc VDS | 16 | 0 | 0 | 0 | 0 | 50 | 15th | – |
| 2019 | MotoGP | Yamaha | Petronas Yamaha SRT | 19 | 0 | 0 | 0 | 0 | 115 | 10th | – |
| 2020 | MotoGP | Yamaha | Petronas Yamaha SRT | 14 | 3 | 5 | 2 | 1 | 158 | **2nd** | – |
| 2021 | MotoGP | Yamaha | Petronas Yamaha SRT | 8 | 0 | 1 | 0 | 0 | 40 | 17th | – |
| 2021 | MotoGP | Yamaha | Monster Energy Yamaha MotoGP | 5 | 0 | 0 | 0 | 0 | 7 | 17th | – |
| 2022 | MotoGP | Yamaha | Monster Energy Yamaha MotoGP | 20 | 0 | 0 | 0 | 0 | 42 | 19th | – |
| 2023 | MotoGP | Yamaha | Monster Energy Yamaha MotoGP | 20 | 0 | 0 | 0 | 0 | 102 | 13th | – |
| 2024 | MotoGP | Ducati | Prima Pramac Racing | 20 | 0 | 0 | 0 | 0 | 173 | 9th | – |
| 2025 | MotoGP | Ducati | Pertamina Enduro VR46 Racing Team | 20 | 0 | 2 | 0 | 1 | 231 | 7th | – |
| 2026 | MotoGP | Ducati | Pertamina Enduro VR46 Racing Team | 0 | 0 | 0 | 0 | 0 | | | – |
| Total | | | | **213** | **11** | **29** | **8** | **15** | **1604** | | **1** |

==== By class ====
| Class | Seasons | 1st GP | 1st pod | 1st win | Race | Win | Podiums | Pole | FLap | Pts | WChmp |
|---|---|---|---|---|---|---|---|---|---|---|---|
| Moto2 | 2013–2017 | 2013 San Marino | 2015 Indianapolis | 2017 Qatar | 71 | 8 | 21 | 6 | 13 | 686 | 1 |
| MotoGP | 2018–present | 2018 Qatar | 2020 Czech Republic | 2020 San Marino | 142 | 3 | 8 | 2 | 2 | 918 | 0 |
| Total | 2013–present | | | | **213** | **11** | **29** | **8** | **15** | **1604** | **1** |

==== Races by year ====
(key) (Races in bold indicate pole position; races in italics indicate fastest lap)

| Year | Class | Bike | 1 | 2 | 3 | 4 | 5 | 6 | 7 | 8 | 9 | 10 | 11 | 12 | 13 | 14 | 15 | 16 | 17 | 18 | 19 | 20 | 21 | 22 | Pos | Pts |
|---|---|---|---|---|---|---|---|---|---|---|---|---|---|---|---|---|---|---|---|---|---|---|---|---|---|---|
| 2013 | Moto2 | Suter | QAT | AME | SPA | FRA | ITA | CAT | NED | GER | INP | CZE | GBR | RSM; 20 | ARA | MAL | AUS | JPN; 18 | VAL; 17 | | | | | | NC | 0 |
| 2014 | Moto2 | Kalex | QAT; 25 | AME; 17 | ARG; 13 | SPA; 20 | FRA; 10 | ITA; 10 | CAT; 21 | NED; 24 | GER; 6 | INP; Ret | CZE; 8 | GBR; 6 | RSM; 7 | ARA; 5 | JPN; 7 | AUS; 13 | MAL; Ret | VAL; 21 | | | | | 11th | 75 |
| 2015 | Moto2 | Kalex | QAT; 5 | AME; 5 | ARG; 5 | SPA; 6 | FRA; 5 | ITA; Ret | CAT; 8 | NED; 19 | GER; Ret | INP; 3 | CZE; 10 | GBR | RSM | ARA | JPN | AUS; 11 | MAL; 15 | VAL; Ret | | | | | 10th | 90 |
| 2016 | Moto2 | Kalex | QAT; 7 | ARG; 25 | AME; 14 | SPA; 4 | FRA; 4 | ITA; 8 | CAT; 11 | NED; 3 | GER; Ret | AUT; 2 | CZE; 8 | GBR; 2 | RSM; 5 | ARA; 3 | JPN; 3 | AUS; 2 | MAL; 2 | VAL; 3 | | | | | 4th | 213 |
| 2017 | Moto2 | Kalex | **QAT**; 1 | ARG; 1 | **AME**; 1 | SPA; Ret | FRA; 1 | **ITA**; 4 | CAT; 5 | **NED**; 1 | **GER**; 1 | CZE; 8 | AUT; 1 | GBR; 3 | RSM; Ret | ARA; 1 | JPN; 8 | AUS; 3 | **MAL**; 3 | VAL; 2 | | | | | 1st | 308 |
| 2018 | MotoGP | Honda | QAT; 12 | ARG; 14 | AME; 21 | SPA; 9 | FRA; 13 | ITA; 15 | CAT; 14 | NED; DNS | GER; WD | CZE; 13 | AUT; 19 | GBR; C | RSM; 12 | ARA; 11 | THA; 14 | JPN; 11 | AUS; 8 | MAL; 12 | VAL; Ret | | | | 15th | 50 |
| 2019 | MotoGP | Yamaha | QAT; 11 | ARG; Ret | AME; 5 | SPA; 7 | FRA; 7 | ITA; Ret | CAT; Ret | NED; 5 | GER; 9 | CZE; Ret | AUT; 10 | GBR; 5 | RSM; 5 | ARA; Ret | THA; 6 | JPN; 6 | AUS; 11 | MAL; 6 | VAL; Ret | | | | 10th | 115 |
| 2020 | MotoGP | Yamaha | SPA; 5 | ANC; Ret | CZE; 2 | AUT; Ret | STY; 15 | RSM; 1 | EMI; 9 | **CAT**; 4 | FRA; Ret | ARA; 6 | TER; 1 | EUR; 11 | **VAL**; 1 | POR; 3 | | | | | | | | | 2nd | 158 |
| 2021 | MotoGP | Yamaha | QAT; 18 | DOH; 12 | POR; 4 | SPA; 3 | FRA; 16 | ITA; 16 | CAT; 9 | GER; 18 | NED | STY | AUT | GBR | ARA | RSM; 18 | AME; 19 | EMI; 14 | ALR; 17 | VAL; 11 | | | | | 17th | 47 |
| 2022 | MotoGP | Yamaha | QAT; 11 | INA; 7 | ARG; Ret | AME; 16 | POR; 13 | SPA; 15 | FRA; 15 | ITA; 17 | CAT; 13 | GER; 13 | NED; Ret | GBR; 15 | AUT; Ret | RSM; Ret | ARA; 17 | JPN; 14 | THA; 13 | AUS; Ret | MAL; 11 | VAL; 10 | | | 19th | 42 |
| 2023 | MotoGP | Yamaha | POR; 14 | ARG; 4^{4} | AME; 8 | SPA; 11 | FRA; 10 | ITA; 10 | GER; 12 | NED; 9 | GBR; 14 | AUT; 11^{9} | CAT; 14 | RSM; 15 | IND; 7 | JPN; 17 | INA; 14 | AUS; 17 | THA; 11 | MAL; 7 | QAT; 16 | VAL; 7 | | | 13th | 102 |
| 2024 | MotoGP | Ducati | QAT; 18 | POR; 18 | AME; Ret | SPA; Ret^{4} | FRA; 7 | CAT; Ret | ITA; 6^{4} | NED; 9**^{9}** | GER; 5^{5} | GBR; 10 | AUT; 8^{6} | ARA; 6 | RSM; Ret^{3} | EMI; 5^{9} | INA; 4^{5} | JPN; 5^{5} | AUS; 6^{5} | THA; Ret^{6} | MAL; 14^{6} | SLD; 8^{6} | | | 9th | 173 |
| 2025 | MotoGP | Ducati | THA; 4^{5} | ARG; 3^{7} | AME; 4^{5} | QAT; 3^{3} | SPA; Ret^{4} | FRA; 15 | GBR; 4 | ARA; 5^{4} | ITA; 6^{7} | NED; 7^{8} | GER; DNS | CZE | AUT; 11 | HUN; 6^{3} | CAT; Ret | RSM; 4^{4} | JPN; 5^{5} | INA; 8^{7} | AUS; 15 | MAL; 4^{4} | POR; Ret | VAL; Ret^{6} | 7th | 231 |
| 2026 | MotoGP | Ducati | THA; 8 | BRA; 12 | USA; 14 | SPA; 12^{3} | FRA; 14 | CAT; 10^{7} | ITA; 14 | HUN; 14 | CZE; 13 | NED; Ret | GER; 13 | GBR; 11^{8} | ARA; Ret | RSM; 13 | AUT; 18 | JPN; 15 | INA; 14 | AUS; C | MAL | QAT | POR | VAL | 16th* | 59* |

* Season still in progress.

=== World Rally Championship results ===
| Year | Car | 1 | 2 | 3 | 4 | 5 | 6 | 7 | Pos | Pts |
|---|---|---|---|---|---|---|---|---|---|---|
| 2020 | Hyundai i20 R5 | MON | SWE | MEX | EST | TUR | ITA | MNZ; 61 | NC | 0 |
