= VR46 Racing Team =

Italian-based motorcycle track racing team

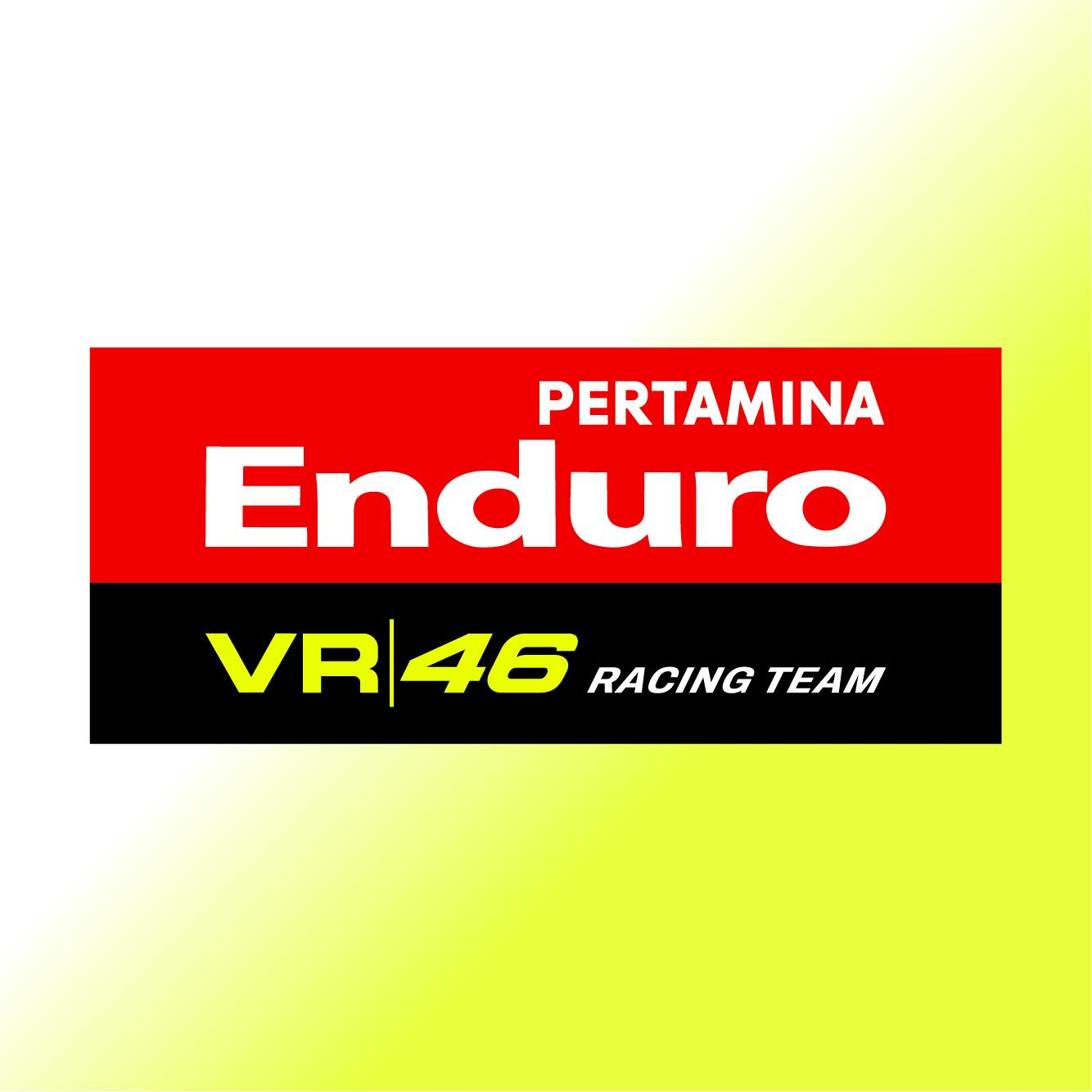
- 2026 name: Pertamina Enduro VR46 Racing Team
- Base: Tavullia, Italy
- Principal: Owner: Valentino Rossi; Team Manager: Pablo Nieto
- Rider(s): MotoGP: 21. Franco Morbidelli; 49. Fabio Di Giannantonio
- Motorcycle: MotoGP: Ducati Desmosedici
- Tyres: MotoGP: Michelin
- Riders' Championships: CEV Moto3 Junior: 2015: Nicolò Bulega; 2017: Dennis Foggia; Moto2: 2018: Francesco Bagnaia; CIV Moto3: 2021: Elia Bartolini
- Teams' Championships: Moto2: 2020

The VR46 Racing Team is a motorcycle racing team owned by Valentino Rossi and based in Tavullia (Marche, Italy). The team enters Grand Prix motorcycle racing in the MotoGP category with Ducati motorcycles chassis, under the name Pertamina Enduro VR46 Racing Team. The team manager is the former road racer Pablo Nieto.

The team has to date collected 32 race wins (9 in Moto3, 19 in Moto2, and 4 in MotoGP), one riders' championship (with Francesco Bagnaia in Moto2 in 2018), and one teams' championship (Moto2 in 2020).

== History ==
The team was founded in 2014 by Rossi to promote young Italian talent in Grand Prix racing.

=== Moto3 ===
The team was founded in 2014 by the nine time world champion Valentino Rossi and entered the Moto3 World Championship as Sky Racing Team VR46, with the goal of promoting young Italian talent in response to the massive influx of Spanish riders in Grand Prix racing since the turn of the century. In the team's first year they choose Romano Fenati and Francesco Bagnaia as riders with Rossi's former Cagiva teammate Vittoriano Guareschi as team manager. It was an up and down season for Fenati, as he scored four podiums in the first six races and ultimately recorded four wins during the season. However, inconsistent results ultimately left him in 5th position in the championship with 176 points. Bagnaia finished top 10 five times during the first seven races with a 4th-place finish at Le Mans as his best result, where he also set the fastest lap of the race. Bagnaia missed the races at Assen and Sachsenring due to injury. After scoring 42 points in the first 7 races of the campaign, Bagnaia slumped badly during the second part of the season, only finishing in the points twice of the last nine races, clearly affected by his injury. He finished the season in 16th position with 50 points.

In 2015, Andrea Migno replaced Bagnaia and Guareschi was replaced by Pablo Nieto, Alessio ‘Uccio’ Salucci, and Carlo Alberto Tebaldi. The 2015 season was also an under-performance for Fenati. Though he maintained some consistency finishing in the top five in eight races – including a victory at Le Mans. Poor qualifying positions for Fenati resulted in the loss of vital points, and he finished the season with 176 points – as he did in 2014 – but placed one position higher in the standings. Migno finished the season in 19th with 35 points.

In 2016, both Fenati and Migno were confirmed and a third bike was given to Nicolò Bulega, but Fenati was fired after ten races and replaced by Lorenzo Dalla Porta. Fenati started the 2016 season with a pole position at Qatar, however he only managed 4th in the race. He finished in 20th in Argentina, before his first win of the season in the United States. He was seventh at Jerez, before a second-place finish at Le Mans, losing out to Brad Binder by 0.099 seconds. Fenati qualified on pole at Mugello, but failed to finish the race. He was fourth in both Catalunya and Netherlands, before a pointless 18 position in Germany. Fenati was dropped by Sky Racing VR46 in Austria as a disciplinary action for a disagreement with Uccio Salucci, team manager and close friend of Rossi. On 16 August, the VR46 team terminated their contract with Romano for the 2016 and 2017 seasons, stating behavioural issues in conflict with team policy as the reason behind the split.

Bulega started the season with sixth place at Qatar. At his fifth race in Moto3, Bulega achieved his first Grand Prix podium at Jerez with 2nd-place finish having started from pole position, which was his first pole position in Grand Prix. Bulega's first fastest lap came at the British Grand Prix in the last lap. Followed by a crash in Aragon, On his birthday Bulega finished the Japanese grand Prix at fourth place and set the fastest lap. But after the third place holder Hiroki Ono was disqualified Bulega was awarded third place. Both in Australia and Malaysia Bulega crashed in the opening lap. His last three crashes in Aragon, Australia and Malaysia was because of the fellow riders. Despite qualifying 4th, Bulega started the final race at Valencia in 16th place due to a twelve-place grid penalty and finished the race in 17th, losing the Rookie of the Year title to Joan Mir. Bulega finished the championship in 7th place with 129 points. Migno achieved two 3rd place finishes (Assen and Valencia) and finished the season in 17th placeoverall with 63 points.

Both Migno and Bulega were retained for the 2017 season. In a year in which previous Rookie of the Year title rival Joan Mir won the Moto3 championship, Bulega struggled to follow up his debut season. Bulega's difficulties included bad qualifying strategies and poor race starts (his height being a primary factor). His best result on the year was a 4th place finish in Germany, one of the few times he was able to qualify on the top six, and a handful of 5th places, including one in his "home" race in the San Marino race. He finished the disappointing year in just 12th place, with 81 points. Migno won his home Grand Prix in Mugello, and finished the season in 9th place with 118 points.

In 2018, Bulega was initially confirmed (then replaced by Celestino Vietti due to injury) and Dennis Foggia was named as second rider. Bulega's first five 2018 races were even worse than the previous year's. He retired in the first four races and finished only on the fifth race, with a 17th place in Spain, being one of the two regular drivers to never score points in the first five races of the year. Both Vietti and Foggia achieved a third place as best result of the season.

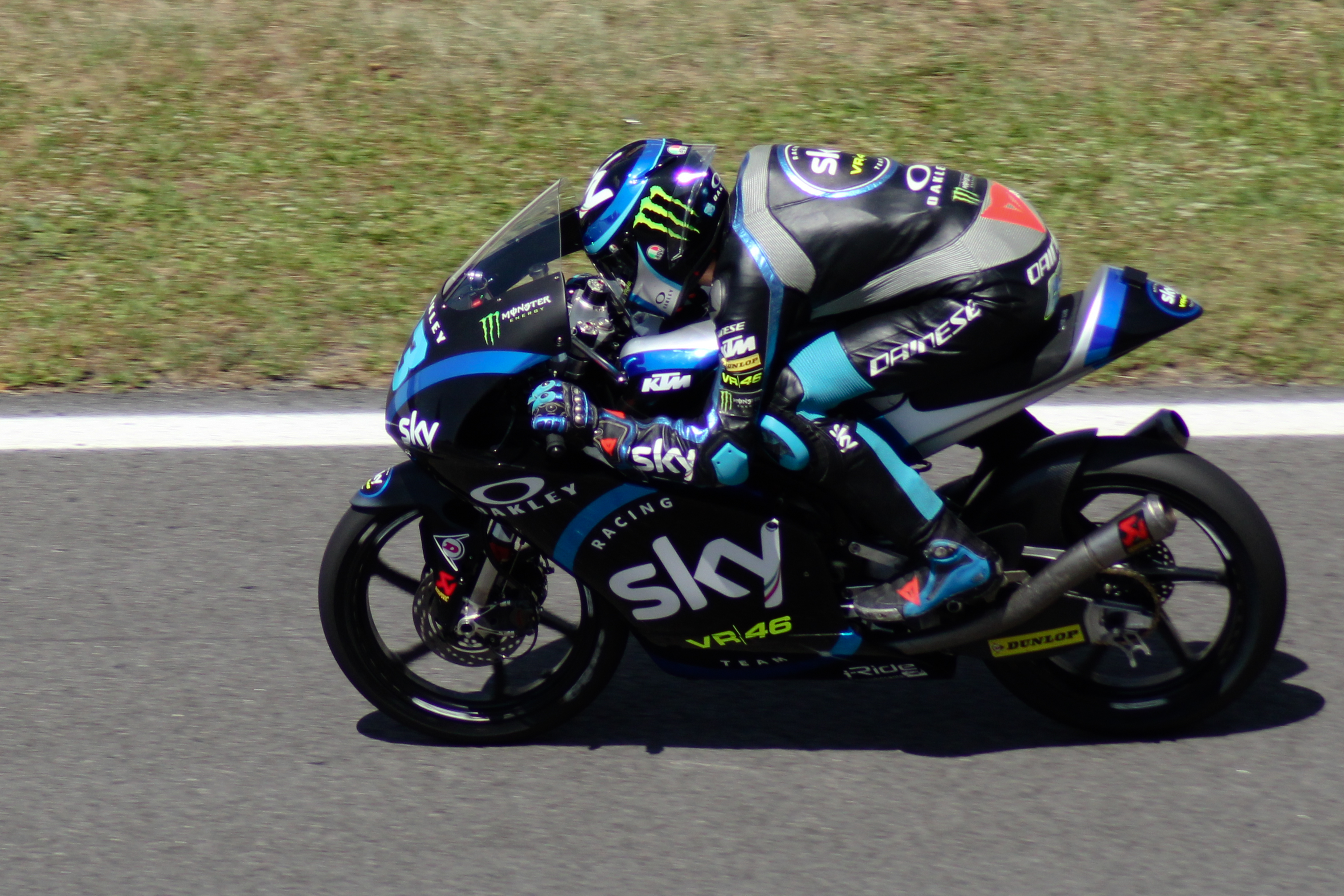
Celestino Vietti at the 2019 Catalan Grand Prix

In 2019, Vietti and Foggia were confirmed as regular riders. Vietti achieved three podiums (Spain, Catalonia and Japan), one pole and one fastest lap, finishing the season 6th with 135 points. Foggia reached a third place in Aragon as best result and a fastest lap in Netherland, finishing the season 12th with 97 points.

Andrea Migno returned to the squad to partner Vietti for 2020. With two race wins and four podiums for Vietti and regular points-scoring finishes for Migno, the team finished 3rd in the teams' championship.

=== Moto2 ===
In 2017, the team decided to take part in the Moto2 class also and selected Bagnaia and Stefano Manzi as riders. In just his fourth-ever Moto2 race at Jerez, Bagnaia finished 2nd. He finished 2nd in the next race as well at Le Mans, after having qualified in 2nd place and missing pole position to Thomas Lüthi by just 0.026 seconds. Bagnaia took a third podium at Sachsenring, finishing 3rd behind Franco Morbidelli who won the race and Miguel Oliveira who came in second. At Misano, Bagnaia originally finished the race 4th behind Dominique Aegerter, Thomas Lüthi, and Hafizh Syahrin - however Aegerter was later disqualified, promoting Bagnaia to his fourth podium of the season. He was crowned Moto2 Rookie of the year after the Japanese Grand Prix at Motegi, and finished his rookie season with 174 points to place 5th in the Moto2 Championship, scoring points in 16 of the 18 races. Manzi finished the season in 25th place with 14 points.

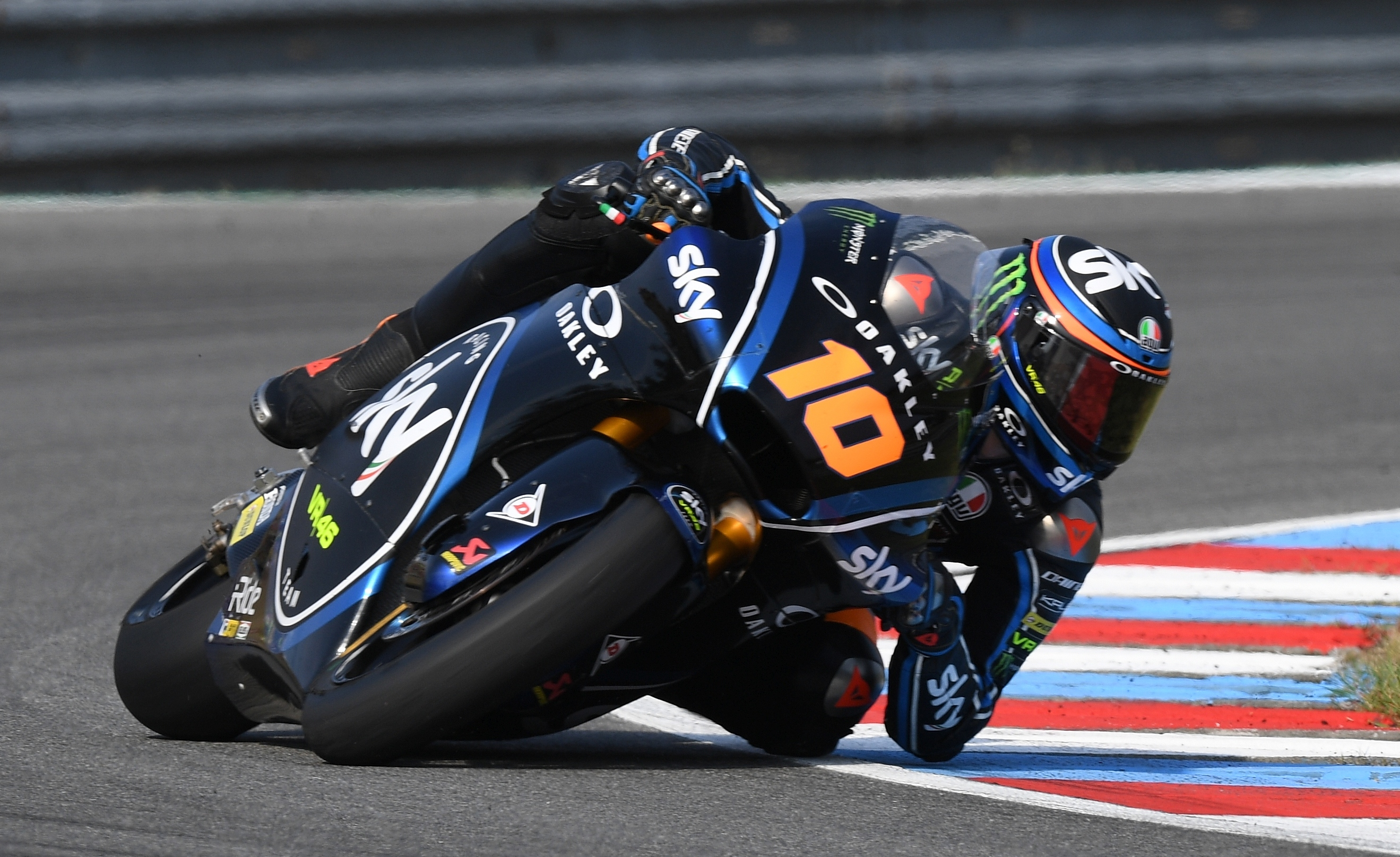
Luca Marini at the 2018 Czech Republic Grand Prix

In 2018, Bagnaia was confirmed to continue with the team and Luca Marini, Rossi's half-brother, was selected as second rider.

Bagnaia opened the season with a win in Qatar, having led the race from start to finish. Bagnaia took a second win in Austin after a hard fight with Álex Márquez, winning the race with a gap of 2.4 seconds and also setting the fastest lap of the race. At Jerez, Bagnaia finished 3rd behind Lorenzo Baldassarri and Miguel Oliveira, holding his starting grid position. Bagnaia took his first pole position in Moto2 at Le Mans, like the race in Qatar he led from start to finish. The win was also his third podium at Le Mans since 2015. Bagnaia took a fourth win at Assen, again the race from pole position and leading the entire race. After qualifying 3rd on the grid in Sachsenring, Bagnaia finished the race in 12th place, having been forced outside of the track after Mattia Pasini fell in front of him in the last corner on the second lap. Despite being down to 26th position, Bagnaia still made up fourteen places, including overtaking Álex Márquez on the final lap in the last corner. At Brno, Bagnaia finished third and lost the championship lead to Oliveira. He retook the championship lead at Austria, winning his fifth race of the season. Bagnaia won his sixth race of the season at Misano from pole position. He took a fifth-straight podium at Buriram, winning the race with his teammate Luca Marini in second place. He took his eighth and final win of the season at Motegi, after Fabio Quartararo (who initially won the race) was disqualified due to low tyre pressure. After finishing 3rd at Sepang, Bagnaia was crowned Moto2 World Champion with his twelfth podium of the season. Marini achieved his first podium in Germany and his first victory in Malaysia, concluding the season in 7th place with 147 points. The VR46 team finished the teams' championship in 2nd place.

In 2019, Marini was confirmed for another season and Nicolò Bulega was selected as second rider. Marini won two races (Thailand and Japan), achieved a second place (Italy), a third place (Netherlands), a pole position (Japan) and a fastest lap (Austria), finishing the season 6th with 190 points. Bulega finished 17th with 48 points, with a 7th place finish as his best result of the season.

For 2020, Marini was partnered with Marco Bezzecchi. With strong performances from both riders (three race wins and six podiums for Marini, two race wins and seven podiums for Bezzecchi), VR46 clinched their first teams' championship with Marini and Bezzecchi finishing 2nd and 4th respectively in the riders' championship.

In 2021, Bezzecchi was joined by Celestino Vietti coming from the Moto3 team. With one race win and seven podiums from Bezzecchi and regular points finishes from Vietti, VR46 achieved 3rd place in the teams' championship.

Vietti was paired with Niccolò Antonelli for 2022. Vietti took his first Moto2 class win at the season opener in Qatar.

From 2023, Fantic will be its own team at the expense of the VR46 entry, The partnership will be already operational from the race at Silverstone 2022, where the Fantic brand appeared on the motorcycles of Celestino Vietti Ramus and Niccolò Antonelli.

=== MotoGP ===
In 2021, Luca Marini made his MotoGP debut, as VR46 and Esponsorama Racing came to an agreement where Esponsorama would organize the racing operations for an entry under the Italian flag and the Sky VR46 name and livery.

Beginning in 2022, the VR46 team entered the MotoGP championship in their own right, taking over the grid slots from Esponsorama Racing who left the premier class after 10 seasons.

The team made their debut in the class with riders Luca Marini and Marco Bezzecchi.

For the 2023 season, the team continued with both Luca Marini and Marco Bezzecchi. They used the Ducati Desmosedici GP22 citing the greater availability of bike data. Bezzecchi managed to fight for the championship, with victories in Argentina, France, and India, until late in the season where injuries and an older bike derailed his title challenge. On the 14th of October, the team announced Indonesian lubricant brand Pertamina as their new title sponsor from 2024.

For 2024, Luca Marini departed the team to join Repsol Honda Team and was replaced by Fabio Di Giannantonio.

Fabio Di Giannantonio at the 2025 Malaysian Grand Prix

For 2025, Marco Bezzecchi departed the team to join Aprilia. He was replaced by Franco Morbidelli, who left Pramac Racing.

For 2026, the team is still using the same rider lineup, Franco Morbidelli and Fabio Di Giannantonio.

For 2027, Franco Morbidelli and Fabio Di Giannantonio will no longer be with the team as they part ways. They will be replaced by Fermín Aldeguer and Nicolò Bulega, who will join the team for the 2027 season.

== Operations ==
=== Technical partnerships ===
==== Esponsorama Racing ====
In 2021, VR46 and Esponsorama Racing came to an agreement where Esponsorama would organize the racing operations for an entry under the Italian flag and the Sky VR46 name and livery.

==== Ducati ====
In June 2021, VR46 Racing signed with Ducati for the use of their chassis and machinery until at least the end of 2024, making them the satellite team of Ducati Corse.

Since 2025, VR46 Racing has been factory-backed by Ducati. VR46 Racing will also field an official Ducati Desmosedici on the track, currently assigned to rider Fabio Di Giannantonio until 2026.

=== Sponsorships ===
Time	Title sponsor	Country	Industry	Reference
2022 - 2023	Mooney Group	Italy	Fintech	
2024 - present	Pertamina	Indonesia	Petroleum	

== Former divisions ==
=== Moto2 ===
In 2017, the team decided to take part in Moto2.

From 2023, Fantic will be its own team at the expense of the VR46 entry. The partnership was already operational from the race at Silverstone 2022, where the Fantic brand appeared on VR46 motorcycles.

=== Moto3 ===
In 2014, VR46 Racing Team entered the Moto3 World Championship as Sky Racing Team VR46.

In the team's first year they choose Romano Fenati and Francesco Bagnaia as riders with Rossi's former Cagiva teammate Vittoriano Guareschi as team manager.

VR46 Racing left Moto3 after 2020, citing "a lack of Italian talent" available between many Italian Moto3 teams (such as Gresini, Sic58, Snipers, and Max Racing).

== Grand Prix motorcycle results ==
Key
Regular rider
Wildcard rider
Replacement rider

=== Moto3 ===
(key) (Races in bold indicate pole position; races in italics indicate fastest lap)

Season	Machine	No	Rider	1	2	3	4	5	6	7	8	9	10	11	12	13	14	15	16	17	18	19	R.C.	Points	T.C.	Points
2014	KTM RC250GP	5	(Italy) Romano Fenati	QAT; 12	AME; 2	ARG; 1	SPA; 1	FRA; Ret	ITA; 1	CAT; 5	NED; 18	GER; Ret	IND; 2	CZE; 11	GBR; 16	RSM; 11	ARA; 1	JPN; 7	AUS; Ret	MAL; Ret	VAL; 14		5th	176	—N/a	—N/a
2014	KTM RC250GP	21	(Italy) Francesco Bagnaia	QAT; 10	AME; 7	ARG; Ret	SPA; 8	FRA; 4	ITA; Ret	CAT; 10	NED; DNS	GER; DNS	IND; Ret	CZE; 17	GBR; 21	RSM; Ret	ARA; 24	JPN; 13	AUS; 11	MAL; Ret	VAL; 16		16th	50	—N/a	—N/a
2015	KTM RC250GP	5	(Italy) Romano Fenati	QAT; Ret	AME; 8	ARG; 8	SPA; 6	FRA; 1	ITA; 3	CAT; 8	NED; 5	GER; 4	IND; 4	CZE; 6	GBR; 12	RSM; 4	ARA; 3	**JPN**; 28	AUS; 6	MAL; 5	VAL; Ret		4th	176	—N/a	—N/a
2015	KTM RC250GP	16	(Italy) Andrea Migno	QAT; 24	AME; 12	ARG; 17	SPA; 21	FRA; 9	ITA; 15	CAT; 28	NED; 12	GER; 21	IND; 20	CZE; 13	GBR; 15	RSM; 13	ARA; 9	JPN; 20	AUS; Ret	MAL; 24	VAL; 11		19th	35	—N/a	—N/a
2015	KTM RC250GP	8	(Italy) Nicolò Bulega																		VAL; 12		31st	4	—N/a	—N/a
2016	KTM RC250GP	8	(Italy) Nicolò Bulega	QAT; 6	ARG; 18	AME; 10	**SPA**; 2	FRA; 5	ITA; 8	CAT; 5	NED; 7	GER; Ret	AUT; 9	CZE; 9	GBR; 5	RSM; 4	ARA; Ret	JPN; 3	AUS; Ret	MAL; Ret	VAL; 17		7th	129	—N/a	—N/a
2016	KTM RC250GP	5	(Italy) Romano Fenati	**QAT**; 4	ARG; 20	AME; 1	SPA; 7	FRA; 2	**ITA**; Ret	CAT; 4	NED; 4	GER; 18	AUT; DNS										10th	93	—N/a	—N/a
2016	KTM RC250GP	16	(Italy) Andrea Migno	QAT; 17	AME; 29	ARG; 15	SPA; 11	FRA; 7	ITA; 10	CAT; 18	NED; 3	GER; Ret	AUT; 25	CZE; 12	GBR; Ret	RSM; 15	ARA; 11	JPN; 24	AUS; Ret	MAL; Ret	VAL; 3		17th	63	—N/a	—N/a
2016	KTM RC250GP	48	(Italy) Lorenzo Dalla Porta												GBR; 18	RSM; 17	ARA; 25	JPN; 11	AUS; 19	MAL; 16	VAL; Ret		30th	12	—N/a	—N/a
2017	KTM RC250GP	16	(Italy) Andrea Migno	QAT; 6	ARG; 5	AME; 12	SPA; 6	FRA; 8	ITA; 1	CAT; 8	NED; 14	GER; 16	CZE; 11	AUT; 21	GBR; 8	RSM; 9	ARA; 11	JPN; 13	AUS; 14	MAL; 6	VAL; 16		9th	118	—N/a	—N/a
2017	KTM RC250GP	8	(Italy) Nicolò Bulega	QAT; 14	ARG; 16	AME; 5	SPA; 7	FRA; 17	ITA; 10	CAT; 9	NED; 10	GER; 4	CZE; 23	AUT; 11	GBR; 20	RSM; 5	ARA; 14	**JPN**; 12	AUS; 11	MAL; Ret	VAL; DNS		12th	81	—N/a	—N/a
2017	KTM RC250GP	10	(Italy) Dennis Foggia														ARA; 8				VAL; 7		24th	19	—N/a	—N/a
2018	KTM RC250GP	10	(Italy) Dennis Foggia	QAT; 16	ARG; Ret	AME; 16	SPA; Ret	FRA; 14	ITA; Ret	CAT; 9	NED; 12	GER; 19	CZE; 12	AUT; 26	GBR; C	RSM; 7	ARA; 25	THA; 3	JPN; 4	AUS; Ret	MAL; Ret	VAL; Ret	19th	55	9th	97
2018	KTM RC250GP	13	(Italy) Celestino Vietti																JPN; 14	AUS; 3	MAL; Ret	VAL; 10	25th	24	9th	97
2018	KTM RC250GP	8	(Italy) Nicolò Bulega	QAT; Ret	ARG; Ret	AME; Ret	SPA; 17	FRA; Ret	ITA; 21	CAT; Ret	NED; 11	GER; 14	CZE; 19	AUT; 23	GBR; C	RSM; Ret	ARA; 14	THA; 7					26th	18	9th	97
2019	KTM RC250GP	13	(Italy) Celestino Vietti	QAT; 5	ARG; 14	AME; 9	SPA; 3	FRA; 7	ITA; 9	CAT; 3	NED; Ret	GER; Ret	CZE; 19	AUT; 4	GBR; 9	RSM; Ret	ARA; 14	**THA**; 6	JPN; 3	AUS; Ret	MAL; 5	VAL; 8	6th	135	4th	232
2019	KTM RC250GP	7	(Italy) Dennis Foggia	QAT; Ret	ARG; 8	AME; 10	SPA; 16	FRA; Ret	ITA; 5	CAT; 5	NED; 9	GER; Ret	CZE; 15	AUT; 14	GBR; 8	RSM; 5	ARA; 3	THA; 5	JPN; 23	AUS; 11	MAL; 19	VAL; DNS	12th	97	4th	232
2019	KTM RC250GP	20	(San Marino) Elia Bartolini													RSM; 15							34th	1	4th	232
2020	KTM RC250GP	13	(Italy) Celestino Vietti	QAT; 28	SPA; 5	AND; 3	CZE; 13	AUT; 5	STY; 1	RSM; Ret	EMI; 2	CAT; 8	FRA; 1	ARA; 9	TER; 5	EUR; 23	VAL; 24	POR; 7					5th	146	3rd	206
2020	KTM RC250GP	16	(Italy) Andrea Migno	QAT; 16	SPA; 4	AND; 22	CZE; 14	AUT; 12	STY; 13	RSM; 10	EMI; 8	CAT; Ret	FRA; 5	ARA; Ret	TER; 18	EUR; 12	VAL; 7	POR; 21					15th	60	3rd	206

=== Moto2 ===
(key) (Races in bold indicate pole position; races in italics indicate fastest lap)

Season	Machine	No	Rider	1	2	3	4	5	6	7	8	9	10	11	12	13	14	15	16	17	18	19	20	R.C.	Points	T.C.	Points
2017	Kalex Moto2	42	(Italy) Francesco Bagnaia	QAT; 12	ARG; 7	AME; 16	SPA; 2	FRA; 2	ITA; 22	CAT; 13	NED; 10	GER; 3	CZE; 7	AUT; 4	GBR; 5	RSM; 3	ARA; 10	JPN; 4	AUS; 12	MAL; 5	VAL; 4			5th	174	—N/a	—N/a
2017	Kalex Moto2	62	(Italy) Stefano Manzi	QAT; 29	ARG; 23	AME; Ret	SPA; 25	FRA; Ret	ITA; Ret	CAT; Ret	NED; 20	GER; 15	CZE; 21	AUT; Ret	GBR; 7	RSM; Ret	ARA; 15	JPN; 26	AUS; 13	MAL; Ret	VAL; Ret			25th	14	—N/a	—N/a
2018	Kalex Moto2	42	(Italy) Francesco Bagnaia	QAT; 1	ARG; 9	AME; 1	SPA; 3	**FRA**; 1	ITA; 4	CAT; 8	**NED**; 1	GER; 12	CZE; 3	**AUT**; 1	**GBR**; C	**RSM**; 1	ARA; 2	THA; 1	**JPN**; 1	AUS; 12	MAL; 3	VAL; 14		1st	306	2nd	453
2018	Kalex Moto2	10	(Italy) Luca Marini	QAT; 9	ARG; 16	AME; 13	SPA; Ret	FRA; Ret	ITA; 7	CAT; 17	NED; 8	GER; 3	**CZE**; 2	AUT; 3	GBR; C	RSM; Ret	ARA; 11	THA; 2	JPN; 9	AUS; 5	MAL; 1	**VAL**; Ret		7th	147	2nd	453
2019	Kalex Moto2	10	(Italy) Luca Marini	QAT; 8	ARG; 7	AME; 6	SPA; 8	FRA; 13	ITA; 2	CAT; 6	NED; 3	GER; 10	CZE; 5	AUT; Ret	GBR; 9	RSM; 11	ARA; 4	THA; 1	**JPN**; 1	AUS; Ret	MAL; 10	VAL; 8		6th	190	6th	238
2019	Kalex Moto2	11	(Italy) Nicolò Bulega	QAT; Ret	ARG; Ret	AME	SPA; 9	FRA; 10	ITA; Ret	CAT; 13	NED; Ret	GER; 18	CZE; 7	AUT; 13	GBR; 20	RSM; Ret	ARA; 12	THA; 8	JPN; Ret	AUS; 12	MAL; 12	VAL; 22		17th	48	6th	238
2020	Kalex Moto2	10	(Italy) Luca Marini	QAT; Ret	SPA; 1	AND; 2	CZE; 4	AUT; 2	STY; 7	RSM; 1	**EMI**; 4	**CAT**; 1	FRA; 17	ARA; Ret	TER; 11	EUR; 6	VAL; 5	POR; 2						2nd	196	1st	380
2020	Kalex Moto2	72	(Italy) Marco Bezzecchi	QAT; 12	SPA; Ret	**AND**; 3	CZE; 6	AUT; 6	STY; 1	RSM; 2	EMI; 2	CAT; 7	FRA; 3	ARA; Ret	TER; Ret	EUR; 1	VAL; 3	POR; 4						4th	184	1st	380
2021	Kalex Moto2	72	(Italy) Marco Bezzecchi	QAT; 4	DOH; 4	POR; 6	SPA; 2	FRA; 3	ITA; 3	CAT; 4	GER; 3	NED; 5	STY; 1	AUT; 10	GBR; 2	ARA; Ret	RSM; 5	AME; 3	EMI; Ret	ALR; 8	VAL; 20			3rd	214	3rd	303
2021	Kalex Moto2	13	(Italy) Celestino Vietti	QAT; 12	DOH; 7	POR; Ret	SPA; 18	FRA; 19	ITA; 16	CAT; 14	GER; 15	NED; 10	STY; 6	AUT; 6	GBR; 12	ARA; 15	RSM; 10	AME; Ret	EMI; 4	ALR; 6	VAL; 4			12th	89	3rd	303
2022	Kalex Moto2	13	(Italy) Celestino Vietti	**QAT**; 1	INA; 2	ARG; 1	AME; Ret	POR; 2	SPA; 6	FRA; 8	ITA; Ret	**CAT**; 1	GER; Ret	NED; 4	GBR; 6	AUT; Ret	**RSM**; Ret	ARA; 10	JPN; Ret	THA; 10	AUS; Ret	MAL; Ret	VAL; Ret	7th	165	8th	165
2022	Kalex Moto2	28	(Italy) Niccolò Antonelli	QAT; 26	INA; 25	ARG; Ret	AME; Ret	POR; Ret	SPA; 23	FRA; Ret	ITA; 18	CAT; 19	GER; Ret	NED; Ret	GBR; 19	AUT; 16	RSM; Ret	ARA; 20	JPN; Ret	THA; 22	AUS; Ret	MAL; 21	VAL; Ret	36th	0	8th	165

=== MotoGP ===
(key)

Season	Name	Machine	Tyres	No.	Rider	Race																						R.C.	Points	T.C.	Points	M.C.	Points
Season	Name	Machine	Tyres	No.	Rider	1	2	3	4	5	6	7	8	9	10	11	12	13	14	15	16	17	18	19	20	21	22	R.C.	Points	T.C.	Points	M.C.	Points
2022	Mooney VR46 Racing Team		M			QAT	INA	ARG	AME	POR	SPA	FRA	ITA	CAT	GER	NED	GBR	AUT	RSM	ARA	JPN	THA	AUS	MAL	VAL					8th	231	1st	448
2022	Mooney VR46 Racing Team	Ducati Desmosedici GP22	M	10	(Italy) Luca Marini	13	14	11	17	12	16	9	6	6	5	17	12	4	4	7^{F}	6	23	6	Ret	7			12th	120	8th	231	1st	448
2022	Mooney VR46 Racing Team	Ducati Desmosedici GP21	M	72	(Italy) Marco Bezzecchi	Ret	20	9	Ret	15	9	12	5	Ret	11	2	10	9	17	10	10	16^{P}	4	4	11			14th	111	8th	231	1st	448
2023	Mooney VR46 Racing Team	Ducati Desmosedici GP22	M			POR	ARG	AME	SPA	FRA	ITA	GER	NED	GBR	AUT	CAT	RSM	IND	JPN	INA	AUS	THA	MAL	QAT	VAL					3rd	530	1st	700
2023	Mooney VR46 Racing Team	Ducati Desmosedici GP22	M	72	(Italy) Marco Bezzecchi	3	1^{2 F}	6^{6}	Ret^{9}	1^{7 F}	8^{2}	4^{7}	2^{P 1}	Ret^{P 2}	3	12^{8}	2^{2}	1^{P 5 F}	4^{6}	5^{3}	6	4^{6 F}	6^{7}	13	Ret^{7}			3rd	329	3rd	530	1st	700
2023	Mooney VR46 Racing Team	Ducati Desmosedici GP22	M	10	(Italy) Luca Marini	Ret	8^{3}	2^{7}	6	Ret^{4}	4^{5}	5^{4}	7	7	4	11	9^{7}	DNS		Ret^{P 2}	12	7^{3}	10^{9}	3^{3}	9			8th	201	3rd	530	1st	700
2024	Pertamina Enduro VR46 Racing Team	Ducati Desmosedici GP23	M			QAT	POR	AME	SPA	FRA	CAT	ITA	NED	GER	GBR	AUT	ARA	RSM	EMI	INA	JPN	AUS	THA	MAL	SLD					5th	318	1st	722
2024	Pertamina Enduro VR46 Racing Team	Ducati Desmosedici GP23	M	49	(Italy) Fabio Di Giannantonio	7	10	6	7	6^{7}	5^{6}	7^{7}	4^{5}	Ret	5^{9}	DNS	8	9	14	Ret^{9}	8^{6}	4^{7}	4^{8 F}					10th	165	5th	318	1st	722
2024	Pertamina Enduro VR46 Racing Team	Ducati Desmosedici GP23	M	72	(Italy) Marco Bezzecchi	14	6	8	3	Ret	11^{9}	13	Ret	8	8	6^{8}	7	5	4^{8}	5^{4}	7	19	Ret^{7}	9	9^{8}			12th	153	5th	318	1st	722
2024	Pertamina Enduro VR46 Racing Team	Ducati Desmosedici GP23	M	29	(Italy) Andrea Iannone																			17				27th	0	5th	318	1st	722
2024	Pertamina Enduro VR46 Racing Team	Ducati Desmosedici GP23	M	51	(Italy) Michele Pirro																				20			29th	0	5th	318	1st	722
2025	Pertamina Enduro VR46 Racing Team		M			THA	ARG	AME	QAT	SPA	FRA	GBR	ARA	ITA	NED	GER	CZE	AUT	HUN	CAT	RSM	JPN	INA	AUS	MAL	POR	VAL			3rd	493	1st	768
2025	Pertamina Enduro VR46 Racing Team	Ducati Desmosedici GP25	M	49	(Italy) Fabio Di Giannantonio	10	5^{5}	3^{4}	16^{6}	5^{6}	8^{7}	9^{3}	9^{6}	3^{5}	6^{4}	Ret^{4}	16	Ret^{8}	15^{2}	Ret^{3}	5^{3}	13	9^{8}	2^{5}	6	8^{5}	3^{3}	6th	262	3rd	493	1st	768
2025	Pertamina Enduro VR46 Racing Team	Ducati Desmosedici GP24	M	21	(Italy) Franco Morbidelli	4^{5}	3^{7}	4^{5}	3^{3}	Ret^{4}	15	4	5^{4}	6^{7}	7^{8}	DNS		11	6^{3}	Ret	4^{4}	5^{5}	8^{7}	15	4^{4}	Ret	Ret^{6}	7th	231	3rd	493	1st	768
2026	Pertamina Enduro VR46 Racing Team		M			THA	BRA	USA	SPA	FRA	CAT	ITA	HUN	CZE	NED	GER	GBR	ARA	RSM	AUT	JPN	INA	AUS	MAL	QAT	POR	VAL			5th*	352*	1st*	569*
2026	Pertamina Enduro VR46 Racing Team	Ducati Desmosedici GP26	M	49	(Italy) Fabio Di Giannantonio	6^{8}	3^{P 2}	4^{P}	3^{5}	4	1^{3 F}	5^{3}	12	4^{4 F}	4^{3}	Ret^{3}	6^{5}	7	7^{4}	9	18	8^{3}	C^{3}	8^{5}	8^{2}			6th*	282*	5th*	352*	1st*	569*
2026	Pertamina Enduro VR46 Racing Team	Ducati Desmosedici GP25	M	21	(Italy) Franco Morbidelli	8	12	14	12^{3}	14	10^{7}	14	14	13	Ret	13	11^{8}	Ret	13	18	15	14	C	10	11			16th*	70*	5th*	352*	1st*	569*

* Season still in progress.
