= Sepang Racing Team =

Malaysian Grand Prix motorcycle racing team

- 2021 name: MotoGP: Petronas Yamaha SRT; Moto2: Petronas Sprinta Racing; Moto3: Petronas Sprinta Racing; MotoE: ONE Energy Racing (2019); WithU Motorsport (2020–2021)
- Base: Sepang, Malaysia
- Principal: Team Principal: Razlan Razali; Team Director: Johan Stigefelt; Team Manager: Wilco Zeelenberg
- Rider(s): MotoGP: 04. Andrea Dovizioso; 20. Fabio Quartararo; 21. Franco Morbidelli; 31. Garrett Gerloff; 35. Cal Crutchlow; 46. Valentino Rossi; 96. Jake Dixon; Moto2: 17. John McPhee; 38. Bradley Smith; 66. Niki Tuuli; 77. Adam Norrodin; 89. Khairul Idham Pawi; 96. Jake Dixon; 97. Xavi Vierge; Moto3: 7. Adam Norrodin; 17. John McPhee; 26. Izam Ikmal; 40. Darryn Binder; 63. Syarifuddin Azman; 71. Ayumu Sasaki; MotoE: 38. Bradley Smith; 51. Eric Granado; 84. Jakub Kornfeil
- Motorcycle: MotoGP: Yamaha YZR-M1; Moto2: Kalex Moto2; Moto3: Honda NSF250RW; MotoE: Energica Ego Corsa
- Tyres: MotoGP: Michelin; Moto2: Dunlop; Moto3: Dunlop; MotoE: Michelin
- Riders' Championships: –

The Sepang Racing Team (formerly known as SIC Racing Team) was a Malaysian Grand Prix motorcycle racing team which operated until the end of 2021, and was owned by the Sepang International Circuit. First established in 2015 in the Moto3 class and expanded in 2019, it fielded teams in MotoGP, Moto2 and Moto3 championships. The MotoGP team was formally called Petronas Yamaha Sepang Racing Team (Petronas Yamaha SRT), while the Moto2 and Moto3 teams were named Petronas Sprinta Racing Team (Petronas SRT).

Following the 2021 season, the MotoGP team became known as RNF MotoGP Racing, with Moto2 and Moto3 being disbanded. Several aspects and team members from the Moto3 crew were recruited by Michael Laverty for his new VisionTrack Honda Moto3 team.

== History ==
The team first raced in Moto2 in 2014, with former Grand Prix racer Johan Stigefelt launching his own outfit in the middleweight class using a Caterham bike and with backing from Malaysian airline Air Asia. Finishing sixth in the championship with Johann Zarco and Josh Herrin, the team then morphed into the Sepang International Circuit Team for the following season.

The team signed Malaysian rider Zulfahmi Khairuddin for their debut season in the lightweight class, joined by Czech racer Jakub Kornfeil. Kornfeil took two podium finishes for the team and finished 12th in the championship, while Khairuddin took a best finish of fifth at the Japanese Grand Prix. Kornfeil remained with the team for 2016, finishing the season in eighth and taking a podium finish at the team's home race in Malaysia. Adam Norrodin, signed to replace Khairuddin, ended the year 28th with a pair of 11th-place finishes his best results.

Retaining Norrodin and replacing Kornfeil with Japanese racer Ayumu Sasaki for 2017, the team ended the season 17th and 20th respectively. In October, they also announced a return to the Moto2 class for 2018, with Malaysian rider Hafizh Syahrin joining the squad. Releasing Syahrin early from his contract to take over Jonas Folger's Tech 3 Yamaha seat in MotoGP, Khairuddin returned to the team for the start of the season.

Retaining Sasaki and Norrodin for 2018, the pair finished the season in 20th and 21st, with Norrodin taking a best finish of fifth. Khairuddin was replaced on the team's Moto2 squad after five rounds by Finnish racer Niki Tuuli, who finished the year in 32nd with a best finish of 15th.

== Expansion into MotoGP ==
In July 2018 it was announced that Sepang Racing Team would make the step up to the premier class for the 2019 MotoGP season, with Yamaha providing leased Yamaha YZR-M1 motorcycles for the 2019, 2020 and 2021 MotoGP seasons. Signing French rookie Fabio Quartararo and Italian rider Franco Morbidelli and being joined by Petronas as title sponsor, the team became Petronas Yamaha SRT. The team expanded their partnership with Petronas further at the 2019 Dutch TT, when the Malaysian oil company also joined the team as technical partner, with the team switching to Petronas' Sprinta engine oil.

Retaining a presence in the Moto2 and Moto3 class, Malaysian rider Khairul Idham Pawi joined the team on their new Triumph-powered Kalex machine. In the Moto3 class, Sasaki remained alongside new signing John McPhee. McPhee gave the team their first ever Grand Prix victory at the French Grand Prix. The team also expanded into the new MotoE series, signing British racer Bradley Smith.

Following Petronas withdrawing its sponsorship at the end of 2021, the MotoGP team became known as RNF MotoGP Racing, with Moto2 and Moto3 being disbanded. A large part of the Moto3 operation was acquired by ex-racer Michael Laverty for a new team named Vision Track Honda to compete in the Moto3 World Championship with two British riders.

== Grand Prix motorcycle results ==
(key) (Races in bold indicate pole position; races in italics indicate fastest lap)

Season	Class	Team	Machine	No	Rider	1	2	3	4	5	6	7	8	9	10	11	12	13	14	15	16	17	18	Points	RC	Points	MC
2014	Moto2	AirAsia Caterham Moto Racing AirAsia Caterham Caterham Moto Racing	Suter MMX2	5	(France) Johann Zarco	QAT; 23	AME; Ret	ARG; 18	ESP; 8	FRA; Ret	ITA; 7	CAT; 3	NED; 4	GER; Ret	IND; 10	CZE; 9	GBR; 4**^{P}**	RSM; 3	ARA; 3	JPN; 4	AUS; Ret	MAL; 4	VAL; 3	146	6th	146	3rd
2014	Moto2	AirAsia Caterham Moto Racing AirAsia Caterham Caterham Moto Racing	Suter MMX2	2	(United States) Josh Herrin	QAT; Ret	AME; Ret			FRA; 22	ITA; Ret	CAT; 16	NED; 18	GER; Ret	IND; 28	CZE; 21	GBR; 24							0	NC	146	3rd
2014	Moto2	AirAsia Caterham Moto Racing AirAsia Caterham Caterham Moto Racing	Suter MMX2	14	(Thailand) Ratthapark Wilairot				ESP; 19									RSM; 23	ARA; 22	JPN; 19	AUS; Ret	MAL; Ret	VAL; 19	0	NC	146	3rd
2015	Moto3	DRIVE M7 SIC	KTM RC250GP	84	(Czech Republic) Jakub Kornfeil	QAT; 17	AME; 11	ARG; 14	ESP; Ret	FRA; 6	ITA; 16	CAT; Ret	NED; 20	GER; 14	IND; 22	CZE; 9	GBR; 2	RSM; 17	ARA; 14	JPN; 12	AUS; 5	MAL; 6	VAL; 3	89	12th	341	2nd
2015	Moto3	DRIVE M7 SIC	KTM RC250GP	63	(Malaysia) Zulfahmi Khairuddin	QAT; 28	AME; 20	ARG; 20	ESP; 26	FRA; 14	ITA; 26	CAT; 24	NED; Ret	GER; 19	IND; 25	CZE; 22	GBR; 14	RSM; Ret	ARA; Ret	JPN; 5	AUS; 12	MAL; Ret	VAL; 17	19	23rd	341	2nd
2016	Moto3	Drive M7 SIC Racing Team	Honda NSF250RW	84	(Czech Republic) Jakub Kornfeil	QAT; 10	ARG; 9	AME; 11	ESP; 5	FRA; 9	ITA; 17	CAT; 10	NED; 13	GER; 4	AUT; 19	CZE; 6	GBR; 15	RSM; 5	ARA; Ret	JPN; 13	AUS; Ret	MAL; 2	VAL; 7	112	8th	350	2nd
2016	Moto3	Drive M7 SIC Racing Team	Honda NSF250RW	7	(Malaysia) Adam Norrodin	QAT; 20	ARG; 11	AME; Ret	ESP; 16	FRA; Ret	ITA; 22	CAT; Ret	NED; 19	GER; Ret	AUT; 23	CZE; Ret	GBR; 23	RSM; 23	ARA; 23	JPN; 12	AUS; 11	MAL; Ret	VAL; 27	14	28th	350	2nd
2017	Moto3	SIC Racing Team Petronas Sprinta Racing	Honda NSF250RW	7	(Malaysia) Adam Norrodin	QAT; 10	ARG; 17	AME; 19	ESP; Ret	FRA; DNS	ITA; 18	CAT; 18	NED; Ret	GER; 13	CZE; 9	AUT; 8	GBR; 12	RSM; Ret	ARA; 15	JPN; Ret	AUS; 8	MAL; 11**^{F}**	VAL; 17	42	17th	445	1st
2017	Moto3	SIC Racing Team Petronas Sprinta Racing	Honda NSF250RW	71	(Japan) Ayumu Sasaki	QAT; 11	ARG; 20	AME; 18	ESP; 15	FRA; 19	ITA; 8	CAT; 16	NED; 15	GER; 17	CZE; 15	AUT; 18	GBR; 18	RSM; Ret	ARA; 16	JPN; Ret	AUS; 7	MAL; 12	VAL; 13	32	20th	445	1st
2017	Moto3	SIC Racing Team Petronas Sprinta Racing	Honda NSF250RW	9	(Malaysia) Kasma Daniel Kasmayudin																	MAL; Ret		0	NC	445	1st

Season	Class	Team	Machine	No	Rider	1	2	3	4	5	6	7	8	9	10	11	12	13	14	15	16	17	18	19	20	Points	RC	Points	TC	Points	MC
2018	Moto3	Petronas Sprinta Racing	Honda NSF250RW	7	(Malaysia) Adam Norrodin	QAT; 11	ARG; 5	AME; Ret	ESP; 16	FRA; Ret	ITA; Ret	CAT; 13	NED; 21	GER; 11	CZE; Ret	AUT; 17	GBR; C	RSM; 12	ARA; 8	THA; 15	JPN; 19	AUS; 7	MAL; 23			46	21st	96	10th	401	1st
2018	Moto3	Petronas Sprinta Racing	Honda NSF250RW	71	(Japan) Ayumu Sasaki	QAT; 8	ARG; 16	AME; 11	ESP; 12	FRA; 16	ITA; 16	CAT; Ret	NED; 19	GER; 10	CZE; 22	AUT; 7	GBR; C	RSM; Ret	ARA	THA; Ret	JPN; 9	AUS; 10	MAL; 18	VAL; 11		50	20th	96	10th	401	1st
2018	Moto3	Petronas Sprinta Racing	Honda NSF250RW	26	(Malaysia) Izam Ikmal																			VAL; Ret		0	NC	96	10th	401	1st
2018	Moto2	SIC Racing Team Petronas Sprinta Racing	Kalex Moto2	63	(Malaysia) Zulfahmi Khairuddin	QAT; 28	ARG; 26	AME; 27	ESP; Ret																	0	NC	1	18th	407	1st
2018	Moto2	SIC Racing Team Petronas Sprinta Racing	Kalex Moto2	66	(Finland) Niki Tuuli					FRA; 22	ITA; 17	CAT; Ret	NED; DNS	GER; DNS	CZE; 21	AUT; 21	GBR; C	RSM; 21	ARA; 22	THA; 15	JPN; 21	AUS	MAL; Ret	VAL; Ret		1	32nd	1	18th	407	1st
2019	MotoE	One Energy Racing	Energica Ego Corsa	38	(United Kingdom) Bradley Smith	GER; 2	AUT; 3	RSM1; 12	RSM2; 8	VAL1; 2	VAL2; 2															88	2nd	-			
2019	Moto3	Petronas Sprinta Racing	Honda NSF250RW	17	(United Kingdom) John McPhee	QAT; 13	ARG; 21	AME; 14	ESP; 12	FRA; 1	ITA; 6	CAT; 13	NED; 5	GER; 6	CZE; Ret	AUT; 3	GBR; 7	RSM; 2	ARA; 4	THA; Ret	JPN; 6	AUS; 5	MAL; 7	VAL; Ret		156	5th	218	5th	439	1st
2019	Moto3	Petronas Sprinta Racing	Honda NSF250RW	71	(Japan) Ayumu Sasaki	QAT; Ret	ARG; 5	AME; Ret	ESP; 15	FRA; 14	ITA; Ret	CAT; 8	NED; 17	**GER**; 9	CZE; 11	AUT; 13	GBR; 6	RSM; Ret	ARA; 13	THA; Ret	JPN; 13	AUS; 7	MAL; Ret	VAL; 19		62	20th	218	5th	439	1st
2019	Moto2	Petronas Sprinta Racing	Kalex Moto2	89	(Malaysia) Khairul Idham Pawi	QAT; 17	ARG; 13	AME; 17	ESP; DNS						CZE; WD											3	30th	8	16th	442	1st
2019	Moto2	Petronas Sprinta Racing	Kalex Moto2	54	(Italy) Mattia Pasini					FRA; Ret	ITA; 11															5 (35) (Note: Non-bracketed number refers to the number accumulated with the motorcycle, with number in brackets referring to the total accumulated for the season.)	20th	8	16th	442	1st
2019	Moto2	Petronas Sprinta Racing	Kalex Moto2	94	(Germany) Jonas Folger							CAT; 19	NED; 17	GER; 17	CZE; 19	AUT; 18										0	NC	8	16th	442	1st
2019	Moto2	Petronas Sprinta Racing	Kalex Moto2	38	(United Kingdom) Bradley Smith												GBR; Ret									0	NC	8	16th	442	1st
2019	Moto2	Petronas Sprinta Racing	Kalex Moto2	47	(Malaysia) Adam Norrodin													RSM; Ret	ARA; DNS	THA; 23	JPN; 22	AUS; 23	MAL; Ret			0	NC	8	16th	442	1st
2019	MotoGP	Petronas Yamaha SRT	Yamaha YZR-M1	20	(France) Fabio Quartararo	QAT; 16**^{F}**	ARG; 8	AME; 7	ESP; Ret**^{P}**	FRA; 8**^{F}**	ITA; 10	CAT; 2**^{P}**	NED; 3**^{P}**	GER; Ret	CZE; 7	AUT; 3	GBR; Ret	RSM; 2	ARA; 5	THA; 2**^{P}**	JPN; 2	AUS; Ret	MAL; 7**^{P}**	VAL; 2**^{P}**		192	5th	307	4th	321	2nd
2019	MotoGP	Petronas Yamaha SRT	Yamaha YZR-M1	21	(Italy) Franco Morbidelli	QAT; 11	ARG; Ret	AME; 5	ESP; 7	FRA; 7	ITA; Ret	CAT; Ret	NED; 5	GER; 9	CZE; Ret	AUT; 10	GBR; 5	RSM; 5	ARA; Ret	THA; 6	JPN; 6	AUS; 11	MAL; 6	VAL; Ret		115	10th	307	4th	321	2nd
2020						SPA	ANC	RSM	EMI		FRA																				
2020	MotoE	WithU Motorsport	Energica Ego Corsa	84	(Czech Republic) Jakub Kornfeil	16	12	16	12	13	13	15														15	18th	-			
2020						QAT	SPA	ANC	CZE	AUT	STY	RSM	EMI	CAT	FRA	ARA	TER	EUR	VAL	POR											
2020	Moto3	Petronas Sprinta Racing	Honda NSF250RW	17	(United Kingdom) John McPhee	2	Ret	2	5	3	Ret	1	10	Ret	Ret	5	6	Ret**^{P}**	11	9						131	7th	131	8th	326	1st
2020	Moto3	Petronas Sprinta Racing	Honda NSF250RW	89	(Malaysia) Khairul Idham Pawi	26	22	20	22	DNS		21	24	24	19	27	27	22	Ret	28						0	NC	131	8th	326	1st
2020	Moto2	Petronas Sprinta Racing	Kalex Moto2	96	(United Kingdom) Jake Dixon	14	18	Ret	Ret	14	8	16	6	Ret	Ret	4	7	DNS								44	18th	123	10th	375	1st
2020	Moto2	Petronas Sprinta Racing	Kalex Moto2	97	(Spain) Xavi Vierge	9	10	8	12	5	6	4	Ret	Ret	Ret	16	12	9**^{P}**	13	10						79	10th	123	10th	375	1st
2020	MotoGP	Petronas Yamaha SRT	Yamaha YZR-M1	20	(France) Fabio Quartararo	-	1**^{P}**	1**^{PF}**	7	8	13	Ret	4	1**^{F}**	9**^{P}**	18**^{P}**	8	14	Ret	14						127	8th	248 (Note: Petronas Yamaha SRT riders scored 285 points, but the team was deducted 37 points after failing to respect MSMA technical changes protocols.)	2nd	204 (Note: Yamaha scored 254 points as a manufacturer, but were deducted 50 points after failing to respect MSMA technical changes protocols.)	2nd
2020	MotoGP	Petronas Yamaha SRT	Yamaha YZR-M1	21	(Italy) Franco Morbidelli	-	5	Ret	2	Ret	15	1	9	4**^{P}**	Ret	6	1**^{F}**	11	1**^{P}**	3						158	2nd	248	2nd	204	2nd
2021						SPA	FRA	CAT	NED	AUT	RSM																				
2021	MotoE	WithU Motorsport	Energica Ego Corsa	51	(Brazil) Eric Granado	13**^{PF}**	1**^{P}**	Ret**^{PF}**	1**^{PF}**	2**^{F}**	Ret	5														84	4th	-			
2021						QAT	DOH	AME	ESP	FRA	ITA	CAT	GER	NED	STY	AUT	GBR	ARA	RSM	AME	EMI	ALG	VAL								
2021	Moto3	Petronas Sprinta Racing	Honda NSF250RW	17	(United Kingdom) John McPhee	Ret	Ret	23	Ret	4	7	Ret	11	6	13	7	12		13	3	Ret	Ret	11			77	13th	216	5th	360	2nd
2021	Moto3	Petronas Sprinta Racing	Honda NSF250RW	40	(South Africa) Darryn Binder	3**^{P}**	2	20	22	20	5	5**^{F}**	14	7	6**^{F}**	9	7	7**^{P}**	6	7	4	DSQ	Ret			136	7th	216	5th	360	2nd
2021	Moto3	Petronas Sprinta Racing	Honda NSF250RW	63	(Malaysia) Syarifuddin Azman													13								3	30th	216	5th	360	2nd
2021	Moto2	Petronas Sprinta Racing	Kalex Moto2	17	(United Kingdom) John McPhee													20								0	37th	123	8th	450	1st
2021	Moto2	Petronas Sprinta Racing	Kalex Moto2	77	(Malaysia) Adam Norrodin												Ret									0	NC	123	8th	450	1st
2021	Moto2	Petronas Sprinta Racing	Kalex Moto2	96	(United Kingdom) Jake Dixon	7	Ret	Ret	DNS	18	14	18	21	18	11	11			19	10	13	Ret	16			30	20th	123	8th	450	1st
2021	Moto2	Petronas Sprinta Racing	Kalex Moto2	97	(Spain) Xavi Vierge	Ret	9	7	6	Ret	Ret	3	Ret	8	9	14	8	Ret	8	8	Ret	Ret	6			93	11th	123	8th	450	1st
2021	MotoGP	Petronas Yamaha SRT	Yamaha YZR-M1	04	(Italy) Andrea Dovizioso														21	13	13	14	12			12	24th	96	10th	309	2nd
2021	MotoGP	Petronas Yamaha SRT	Yamaha YZR-M1	21	(Italy) Franco Morbidelli	18	12	4	3	16	16	9	18													40 (47) (Note: Non-bracketed number refers to the number accumulated with the motorcycle, with number in brackets referring to the total accumulated for the season.)	17th	96	10th	309	2nd
2021	MotoGP	Petronas Yamaha SRT	Yamaha YZR-M1	31	(United States) Garrett Gerloff									17												0	29th	96	10th	309	2nd
2021	MotoGP	Petronas Yamaha SRT	Yamaha YZR-M1	35	(United Kingdom) Cal Crutchlow										17	17										0 (0)	28th	96	10th	309	2nd
2021	MotoGP	Petronas Yamaha SRT	Yamaha YZR-M1	46	(Italy) Valentino Rossi	12	16	Ret	16	11	10	Ret	14	Ret	13	8	18	19	17	15	10	13	10			44	18th	96	10th	309	2nd
2021	MotoGP	Petronas Yamaha SRT	Yamaha YZR-M1	96	(United Kingdom) Jake Dixon												19	Ret								0	30th	96	10th	309	2nd
