= M7 Japan =

Brand of auto parts and energy drinks

M7 Japan is a brand of auto parts and energy drinks. It was founded in 2006 as a lubricant and oil brand before expanding to energy drink production in 2011.

Since its inception, M7 Japan and Drive M7 have been involved in motor racing competition such as GP 2 series, drift racing, SuperGT, and MotoGP, including the Aspar Team and the Moto3 racing team SIC Racing Team.
