= Niccolò Antonelli =

Italian motorcycle racer (born 1996)

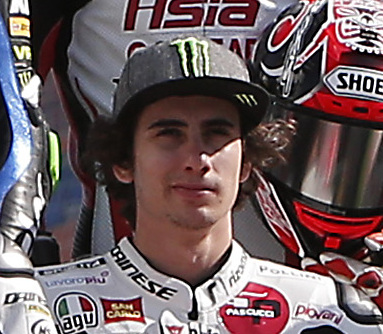
- Antonelli in 2019
- Nationality: Italian
- Born: 23 February 1996 (age 30); Cattolica, Italy
- Current team: VFT Racing
- Bike number: 5
Motorcycle racing career statistics
Moto2 World Championship
Active years	2022
Manufacturers	Kalex
Championships	0
2022 championship position	36th (0 pts)
Starts / Wins / Podiums / Poles / F. laps / Points; 20 / 0 / 0 / 0 / 0 / 0
Moto3 World Championship
Active years	2012–2021
Manufacturers	Honda, FTR Honda, KTM
Championships	0
2021 championship position	6th (152 pts)
Starts / Wins / Podiums / Poles / F. laps / Points; 163 / 4 / 11 / 9 / 4 / 886
Supersport World Championship
Active years	2024–
Manufacturers	Ducati (2024); Yamaha (2025–)
2025 championship position	26th (13 pts)
Starts / Wins / Podiums / Poles / F. laps / Points; 46 / 0 / 0 / 0 / 0 / 59

Niccolò Antonelli (born 23 February 1996) is an Italian Grand Prix motorcycle racer who last competed in the 2025 Supersport World Championship for VFT Racing. He was the 2011 Italian 125GP champion.

Antonelli is not related to both fellow motorcycle racer Andrea Antonelli and the similarly-named Formula One driver Kimi Antonelli.

== Career ==
=== Junior career ===
In 2010, Antonelli competed in the 2010 Red Bull MotoGP Rookies Cup, finishing eighth overall with 56 points. He scored points in all rounds except the first race in Germany. In 2011, then-15-year-old Antonelli became the Italian 125GP champion.

=== Moto3 World Championship ===
==== San Carlo Gresini Moto3 (2012) ====
The debut season for Antonelli in Grand Prix racing came in 2012, riding for the San Carlo Gresini Racing team. He showed pace and some consistency straight away, with two fourth place finishes in France and Germany as his best results of the year. Antonelli finished his rookie season 14th in the championship with 77 points.

==== Junior Team GO&FUN Moto3 (2013–2014) ====
Antonelli started the 2013 Moto3 World Championship with higher expectations, but pushed too hard and crashed too often. He began the season with four straight crashes and DNFs, finishing the season with six total, and only scored 47 points, enough for 16th in the final standings.

Staying with Gresini Racing, the 2014 Moto3 World Championship was much of the same, another crash-filled season for Antonelli, with a total of six crashes and DNFs. His season's best finish was fifth in Assen, with a pole position coming in the last race at Valencia, but only finished 14th in the final standings, with 68 points.

==== Ongetta-Rivacold (2015–2016) ====
After disappointing seasons, Gresini and Antonelli parted ways. Racing for the new Rivacold Honda team, 2015 was the bounce-back year for Antonelli. After taking his first pole position the year prior, he took his first Moto3 podium and victory at the 2015 Czech Republic Grand Prix. Antonelli, who started the race from pole position, dropped to sixth on the opening lap but worked his way up the order to retake the lead on the penultimate lap, and held on to win ahead of Enea Bastianini and Brad Binder. He scored two third place finishes in the following races in Britain and San Marino, and added a second win later in the season at Motegi. Antonelli had a total of four podiums in the season, finishing fifth in the final standings with 174 points, in front of riders like Brad Binder, Fabio Quartararo, Francesco Bagnaia, and Jorge Martín.

For the 2016 Moto3 World Championship, Antonelli was considered one of the title favourites, and started the season accordingly, winning the season opening race in Qatar. He would struggle throughout the rest of the season however, finishing the season with no other podiums, and two big crashes, one of which fractured his leg in Germany, causing him to miss a race. He ended the year 11th in the standings, with only 91 points.

==== Red Bull KTM Ajo (2017) ====
Leaving the Rivacold Honda team for Red Bull KTM Ajo Motorsport, Antonelli was partnered by Bo Bendsneyder for the 2017 Moto3 World Championship. Both riders struggled, Antonelli finishing the season with only one podium, a second place in Japan, which amounted for more than half of his 38 points for the year.

==== Sic58 Squadra Corse (2018–2020) ====
Being let go by the Ajo team, Antonelli signed with Sic58 Squadra Corse for the 2018 Moto3 World Championship, partnering Tatsuki Suzuki. Although not scoring any podiums, Antonelli had a better year, scoring 71 points, and finishing 15th in the standings.

Staying with Squadra Corse for the 2019 season, Antonelli scored his fourth and final victory in the Moto3 class in Jerez, and it was his only podium finish of the season. Following a crash in the San Marino Grand Prix, Antonelli missed the next two races in Aragón and Thailand, before making his return in Japan where he took pole position, but only finished the race in 12th. After being mathematically eliminated from championship contention, Antonelli sat out the last two races of the season in Australia and Valencia, to focus on rehab. Despite missing four races, he still managed to finish seventh in the standings, with 128 points, four points ahead of teammate Tatsuki Suzuki.

Staying with Squadra Corse for his final contract year, Antonelli was once again partnered by Tatsuki Suzuki in the 2020 season. Fortunes would be flipped however, with Antonelli having a woeful year, no podiums and only 40 points in the entire season, while Suzuki scored three pole positions in the first three races, winning a race in Jerez, and coming in third place in San Marino.

==== Avintia Esponsorama Moto3 (2021) ====
Leaving Sic58 Squadra Corse and Tatsuki Suzuki, Antonelli would switch to Avintia Esponsorama Racing for the 2021 season. Antonelli started the season well, finishing third in the second race of the season at Doha. The middle of the season saw him constantly finish in the points, before his yearly recurring big crash in Austria caused him to miss two races, in which he was replaced by Elia Bartolini. He returned in Silverstone finishing second, before finishing fifth in Aragón, and another second place finish in Rimini, which was his tenth podium in the Moto3 category. He ended the year well, with a pole position turned 6th place in Misano, a third place podium finish in Portimao, and a ninth place in Valencia. Antonelli finished his final year of Moto3 sixth in the championship standings, with 152 points, his best tally since 2015.

=== Moto2 World Championship ===
==== Mooney VR46 Racing Team (2022) ====
In November 2021, following Marco Bezzecchi's promotion to MotoGP, it was announced by Pablo Nieto that Antonelli will be promoted to race in the 2022 Moto2 World Championship, for Mooney VR46 Racing Team, partnering Celestino Vietti.

The year was met with difficulties and he ended the season as the only full-time rider without scoring a point, finishing the year in 36th place out of 43 riders. His best race was at Spielberg. Qualifying 25th, a lot of falls raised him to 16th place, just six seconds shy of his first points. He was supposed to stay with the team (now renamed Fantic Motor) for 2023, but was unexpectedly replaced during the winter for Borja Gomez. Antonelli will race on the European Moto2 Championship in 2023.

=== Moto2 European Championship ===
==== Team MMR (2023) ====
In the 2023 season, Antonelli raced with Team MMR in the FIM JuniorGP Moto2 World Championship.

== Career statistics ==
=== Red Bull MotoGP Rookies Cup ===
==== Races by year ====
(key) (Races in bold indicate pole position, races in italics indicate fastest lap)

Year	1	2	3	4	5	6	7	8	9	10	Pos	Pts
2010	SPA1; 7	SPA2; 7	ITA; 7	NED1; 15	NED2; 13	GER1; 18	GER2; 13	CZE1; 11	CZE2; 7	RSM; 8	9th	79

=== FIM Moto2 European Championship ===
==== Races by year ====
(key) (Races in bold indicate pole position, races in italics indicate fastest lap)

Year	Bike	1	2	3	4	5	6	7	8	9	10	11	Pos	Pts
2023	Kalex	EST1; 8	EST2; 3	VAL1; 8	JER; Ret	POR1; 7	POR2; Ret	CAT1; Ret	CAT2; Ret	ARA1; 7	ARA2; Ret	VAL2	11th	50

* Season still in progress.

=== Grand Prix motorcycle racing ===
==== By season ====
Season	Class	Motorcycle	Team	Number	Race	Win	Podium	Pole	FLap	Pts	Plcd
2012	Moto3	Honda	San Carlo Gresini Moto3	23	1	0	0	0	0	77	14th
2012	Moto3	FTR Honda	San Carlo Gresini Moto3	23	15	0	0	0	0	77	14th
2013	Moto3	FTR Honda	GO&FUN Gresini Moto3	23	17	0	0	0	0	47	16th
2014	Moto3	KTM	Junior Team GO&FUN Moto3	23	18	0	0	1	0	68	14th
2015	Moto3	Honda	Ongetta-Rivacold	23	18	2	4	2	2	174	5th
2016	Moto3	Honda	Ongetta-Rivacold	23	17	1	1	1	0	91	11th
2017	Moto3	KTM	Red Bull KTM Ajo	23	16	0	1	0	0	38	18th
2018	Moto3	Honda	Sic58 Squadra Corse	23	16	0	0	1	0	71	15th
2019	Moto3	Honda	Sic58 Squadra Corse	23	15	1	1	3	2	128	7th
2020	Moto3	Honda	Sic58 Squadra Corse	23	14	0	0	0	0	40	19th
2021	Moto3	KTM	Avintia Esponsorama Moto3	23	16	0	4	1	0	152	6th
2022	Moto2	Kalex	Mooney VR46 Racing Team	28	20	0	0	0	0	0	36th
Total				**183**	**4**	**11**	**9**	**4**	**886**		

==== By class ====
Class	Seasons	1st GP	1st pod	1st win	Race	Win	Podiums	Pole	FLap	Pts	WChmp
Moto3	2012–2021	2012 Qatar	2015 Czech Republic	2015 Czech Republic	163	4	11	9	4	886	0
Moto2	2022	2022 Qatar			20	0	0	0	0	0	0
Total	2012–2022				**183**	**4**	**11**	**9**	**4**	**886**	**0**

==== Races by year ====
(key) (Races in bold indicate pole position, races in italics indicate fastest lap)

Year	Class	Bike	1	2	3	4	5	6	7	8	9	10	11	12	13	14	15	16	17	18	19	20	Pos	Pts
2012	Moto3	Honda	QAT; 17																				14th	77
2012	Moto3	FTR Honda		SPA; 8	POR; 6	FRA; 4	CAT; 12	GBR; 13	NED; Ret	GER; 12	ITA; 4	INP; Ret	CZE; 23	RSM; 8	ARA; 10	JPN; 12	MAL; 15	AUS; DNS	VAL; 13				14th	77
2013	Moto3	FTR Honda	QAT; Ret	AME; Ret	SPA; Ret	FRA; Ret	ITA; 7	CAT; Ret	NED; 13	GER; 15	INP; 16	CZE; 10	GBR; 13	RSM; 8	ARA; 14	MAL; Ret	AUS; 8	JPN; 9	VAL; 27				16th	47
2014	Moto3	KTM	QAT; 9	AME; Ret	ARG; 25	SPA; Ret	FRA; Ret	ITA; Ret	CAT; Ret	NED; 5	GER; Ret	INP; 18	CZE; 13	GBR; 7	RSM; 16	ARA; 9	JPN; 9	AUS; 10	MAL; 7	**VAL**; 7			14th	68
2015	Moto3	Honda	QAT; 8	AME; 23	ARG; Ret	SPA; Ret	FRA; 5	ITA; 6	CAT; 4	NED; 9	GER; 5	INP; 7	**CZE**; 1	GBR; 3	RSM; 3	ARA; 6	JPN; 1	AUS; 17	**MAL**; 4	VAL; Ret			5th	174
2016	Moto3	Honda	QAT; 1	ARG; 10	AME; Ret	SPA; Ret	**FRA**; 8	ITA; 4	CAT; 20	NED; 5	GER; DNS	AUT; 18	CZE; 5	GBR; DSQ	RSM; 11	ARA; 14	JPN; 10	AUS; Ret	MAL; 12	VAL; 16			11th	91
2017	Moto3	KTM	QAT; 7	ARG; Ret	AME; 14	SPA; 22	FRA; Ret	ITA; 16	CAT; 11	NED; DNS	GER	AUT; 24	CZE; Ret	GBR; 16	RSM; Ret	ARA; 18	JPN; 2	AUS; Ret	MAL; Ret	VAL; 14			18th	38
2018	Moto3	Honda	**QAT**; 4	ARG; 8	AME; 24	SPA; 11	FRA; 5	ITA; 9	CAT; DNS	NED; 15	GER; 16	CZE; 11	AUT; 22	GBR; C	RSM; 10	ARA; Ret	THA; Ret	JPN; Ret	AUS	MAL; 10	VAL; 7		15th	71
2019	Moto3	Honda	QAT; 8	ARG; 4	**AME**; 5	SPA; 1	FRA; Ret	ITA; 4	CAT; 11	**NED**; 8	GER; 12	CZE; 5	AUT; 9	GBR; 4	RSM; Ret	ARA	THA	**JPN**; 12	AUS; DNS	MAL; 10	VAL; DNS		7th	128
2020	Moto3	Honda	QAT	SPA; 9	ANC; 15	CZE; 4	AUT; 19	STY; 16	RSM; 11	EMI; 18	CAT; 9	FRA; Ret	ARA; 18	TER; 22	EUR; Ret	VAL; 14	POR; 11						19th	40
2021	Moto3	KTM	QAT; 6	DOH; 3	POR; 6	SPA; 8	FRA; Ret	ITA; 13	CAT; 8	GER; 6	NED; 14	STY; DNS	AUT	GBR; 2	ARA; 5	RSM; 2	AME; 15	**EMI**; 6	ALR; 3	VAL; 9			6th	152
2022	Moto2	Kalex	QAT; 26	INA; 25	ARG; Ret	AME; Ret	POR; Ret	SPA; 23	FRA; Ret	ITA; 18	CAT; 19	GER; Ret	NED; Ret	GBR; 19	AUT; 16	RSM; Ret	ARA; 20	JPN; Ret	THA; 22	AUS; Ret	MAL; 21	VAL; Ret	36th	0

=== Supersport World Championship ===
==== Races by year ====
(key) (Races in bold indicate pole position, races in italics indicate fastest lap)

Year	Bike	1		2		3		4		5		6		7		8		9		10		11		12		Pos	Pts
Year	Bike	R1	R2	R1	R2	R1	R2	R1	R2	R1	R2	R1	R2	R1	R2	R1	R2	R1	R2	R1	R2	R1	R2	R1	R2	Pos	Pts
2024	Ducati	AUS; Ret	AUS; 17	SPA; 9	SPA; 18	NED; 15	NED; 4	ITA; 23	ITA; 9	GBR; 19	GBR; 16	CZE; 27	CZE; 18	POR; Ret	POR; 13	FRA; 30	FRA; 21	ITA; Ret	ITA; DNS	SPA; 13	SPA; Ret	POR; 16	POR; 14	SPA; 9	SPA; 13	17th	46
2025	Yamaha	AUS; 11	AUS; DNS	POR; 16	POR; 16	NED; 22	NED; 19	ITA; 11	ITA; Ret	CZE; 16	CZE; 30	EMI; 18	EMI; 15	GBR; 15	GBR; 19	HUN; 25	HUN; Ret	FRA; 15	FRA; Ret	ARA; 21	ARA; 18	EST; 18	EST; 20	SPA; 28	SPA; Ret	26th	13

Sporting positions
Preceded by Francesco Mauriello	Italian 125GP Champion; 2011	Succeeded by Lorenzo Dalla Porta
