= Kaito Toba =

Japanese motorcycle racer

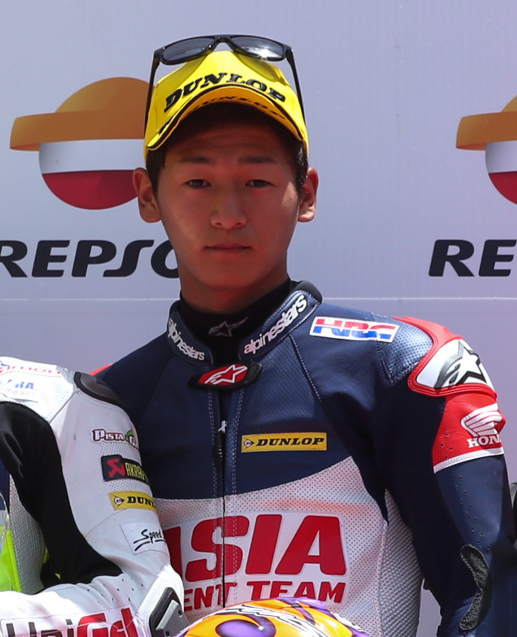
- Toba in 2016
- Nationality: Japanese
- Born: 7 April 2000 (age 26); Fukuoka, Japan
- Current team: Team Étoile
- Bike number: 25
Motorcycle racing career statistics
Moto3 World Championship
| Active years | 2017–2023 |
| Manufacturers | Honda (2017–2019, 2023); KTM (2020–2022) |
| 2023 championship position | 11th (105 pts) |
Starts / Wins / Podiums / Poles / F. laps / Points; 127 / 1 / 5 / 0 / 1 / 380
Supersport World Championship
| Active years | 2024– |
| Manufacturers | Honda |
| 2025 championship position | 25th (15 pts) |
Starts / Wins / Podiums / Poles / F. laps / Points; 48 / 0 / 0 / 0 / 0 / 36

Kaito Toba (鳥羽 海渡, Toba Kaito; born 7 April 2000) is a Japanese motorcycle racer who competes in the Superstock class of the Endurance World Championship for Team Étoile, aboard a BMW M1000RR.

== Career ==
Toba was the Asia Talent Cup champion in 2014 and a Red Bull MotoGP Rookies Cup contestant in 2015 and 2016.

=== Moto3 ===
Toba was signed up to race in the Moto3 World Championship for Honda Team Asia for 2017.

In 2018, Toba remained in the same team. His best performance landed him in sixth place for Catalonia. He ended the season in 22nd place with 37 points. In 2019, he remained in the same team and his teammate was Ai Ogura. He got his first World Championship victory in Qatar and ended the season in 19th place with 63 points.

==== Supersport World Championship ====
The Petronas MIE Racing Honda Team will field Toba, partnering with Khairul Idham Pawi in the 2024 Supersport World Championship.

== Career statistics ==
=== Asia Talent Cup ===
==== Races by year ====
(key) (Races in bold indicate pole position; races in italics indicate fastest lap)

| Year | Bike | 1 | 2 | 3 | | 4 | | 5 | 6 | | Pos | Pts |
| Year | Bike | R1 | R1 | R1 | R2 | R1 | R2 | R1 | R1 | R2 | Pos | Pts |
|---|---|---|---|---|---|---|---|---|---|---|---|---|
| 2014 | Honda | QAT; Ret | IDN; 1 | CHN1; 1 | CHN2; 4 | MAL1; 1 | MAL2; 2 | JAP; 5 | MYS1; 2 | MYS2; 3 | 1st | 155 |

=== Red Bull MotoGP Rookies Cup ===
==== Races by year ====
(key) (Races in bold indicate pole position, races in italics indicate fastest lap)

| Year | 1 | 2 | 3 | 4 | 5 | 6 | 7 | 8 | 9 | 10 | 11 | 12 | 13 | Pos | Pts |
|---|---|---|---|---|---|---|---|---|---|---|---|---|---|---|---|
| 2015 | JER1; 4 | JER2; 9 | ASS1; 10 | ASS2; Ret | SAC1; 7 | SAC2; 3 | BRN1; 7 | BRN2; 6 | SIL1; Ret | SIL2; Ret | MIS; Ret | ARA1; 7 | ARA2; Ret | 9th | 79 |
| 2016 | **JER1**; Ret | **JER2**; Ret | ASS1; Ret | ASS2; 7 | SAC1; 4 | SAC2; 1 | RBR1; 4 | RBR2; 6 | BRN1; Ret | BRN2; 6 | MIS; 3 | **ARA1**; 1 | **ARA2**; Ret | 5th | 121 |

=== FIM CEV Moto3 Junior World Championship ===
==== Races by year ====
(key) (Races in bold indicate pole position, races in italics indicate fastest lap)

| Year | Bike | 1 | 2 | 3 | 4 | 5 | 6 | 7 | 8 | 9 | 10 | 11 | 12 | Pos | Pts |
|---|---|---|---|---|---|---|---|---|---|---|---|---|---|---|---|
| 2015 | Honda | ALG; 15 | LMS; 11 | CAT1; Ret | CAT2; Ret | ARA1; 10 | ARA2; Ret | ALB; 9 | NAV; 19 | JER1; Ret | JER2; Ret | VAL1; 11 | VAL2; 16 | 20th | 24 |
| 2016 | Honda | VAL1; 10 | VAL2; 1 | LMS; 2 | ARA; 4 | CAT1; Ret | CAT2; Ret | ALB; 3 | ALG; 6 | JER1; Ret | JER2; 4 | VAL1; Ret | VAL2; Ret | 4th | 103 |

=== FIM Moto2 European Championship ===
==== Races by year ====
(key) (Races in bold indicate pole position, races in italics indicate fastest lap)

| Year | Bike | 1 | 2 | 3 | 4 | 5 | 6 | 7 | 8 | 9 | 10 | 11 | Pos | Pts |
|---|---|---|---|---|---|---|---|---|---|---|---|---|---|---|
| 2024 | Kalex | MIS | EST1; 13 | EST2; Ret | CAT1; Ret | CAT2; Ret | POR1; 8 | POR2; 6 | JER; WD | ARA1 | ARA2 | EST | 17th | 21 |

=== Grand Prix motorcycle racing ===
==== By season ====
| Season | Class | Motorcycle | Team | Race | Win | Podium | Pole | FLap | Pts | Plcd |
|---|---|---|---|---|---|---|---|---|---|---|
| 2017 | Moto3 | Honda | Honda Team Asia | 18 | 0 | 0 | 0 | 0 | 7 | 30th |
| 2018 | Moto3 | Honda | Honda Team Asia | 18 | 0 | 0 | 0 | 0 | 37 | 22nd |
| 2019 | Moto3 | Honda | Honda Team Asia | 18 | 1 | 1 | 0 | 1 | 63 | 19th |
| 2020 | Moto3 | KTM | Red Bull KTM Ajo | 15 | 0 | 1 | 0 | 0 | 41 | 18th |
| 2021 | Moto3 | KTM | CIP Green Power | 18 | 0 | 1 | 0 | 0 | 64 | 17th |
| 2022 | Moto3 | KTM | CIP Green Power | 20 | 0 | 1 | 0 | 0 | 63 | 19th |
| 2023 | Moto3 | Honda | Sic58 Squadra Corse | 20 | 0 | 1 | 0 | 0 | 105 | 11th |
| Total | | | | **127** | **1** | **5** | **0** | **1** | **380** | |

==== By class ====
| Class | Seasons | 1st GP | 1st pod | 1st win | Race | Win | Podiums | Pole | FLap | Pts | WChmp |
|---|---|---|---|---|---|---|---|---|---|---|---|
| Moto3 | 2017–2023 | 2017 Qatar | 2019 Qatar | 2019 Qatar | 127 | 1 | 5 | 0 | 1 | 380 | 0 |
| Total | 2017–2023 | | | | **127** | **1** | **5** | **0** | **1** | **380** | **0** |

==== Races by year ====
(key) (Races in bold indicate pole position, races in italics indicate fastest lap)

| Year | Class | Bike | 1 | 2 | 3 | 4 | 5 | 6 | 7 | 8 | 9 | 10 | 11 | 12 | 13 | 14 | 15 | 16 | 17 | 18 | 19 | 20 | Pos | Pts |
|---|---|---|---|---|---|---|---|---|---|---|---|---|---|---|---|---|---|---|---|---|---|---|---|---|
| 2017 | Moto3 | Honda | QAT; 19 | ARG; 10 | AME; Ret | SPA; 17 | FRA; Ret | ITA; 25 | CAT; 23 | NED; 19 | GER; 21 | CZE; 29 | AUT; 15 | GBR; Ret | RSM; Ret | ARA; 28 | JPN; 21 | AUS; 20 | MAL; 20 | VAL; 24 | | | 30th | 7 |
| 2018 | Moto3 | Honda | QAT; 7 | ARG; 19 | AME; Ret | SPA; 9 | FRA; 17 | ITA; 20 | CAT; 6 | NED; 16 | GER; 18 | CZE; Ret | AUT; 16 | GBR; C | RSM; 13 | ARA; 26 | THA; 12 | JPN; 17 | AUS; 19 | MAL; 12 | VAL; Ret | | 22nd | 37 |
| 2019 | Moto3 | Honda | QAT; 1 | ARG; 10 | AME; Ret | SPA; 6 | FRA; 6 | ITA; Ret | CAT; Ret | NED; Ret | GER; Ret | CZE; Ret | AUT; 18 | GBR; 20 | RSM; Ret | ARA; DNS | THA; 7 | JPN; 17 | AUS; Ret | MAL; Ret | VAL; 13 | | 19th | 63 |
| 2020 | Moto3 | KTM | QAT; 14 | SPA; 19 | ANC; 11 | CZE; 11 | AUT; 20 | STY; NC | RSM; 17 | EMI; 9 | CAT; 18 | FRA; Ret | ARA; 11 | TER; 3 | EUR; Ret | VAL; Ret | POR; 15 | | | | | | 18th | 41 |
| 2021 | Moto3 | KTM | QAT; 9 | DOH; 5 | POR; NC | SPA; 16 | FRA; 21 | ITA; 12 | CAT; 9 | GER; 2 | NED; 13 | STY; 12 | AUT; 10 | GBR; Ret | ARA; 16 | RSM; 14 | AME; 23 | EMI; 17 | ALR; NC | VAL; 17 | | | 17th | 64 |
| 2022 | Moto3 | KTM | QAT; 3 | INA; 12 | ARG; 9 | AME; Ret | POR; 17 | SPA; 7 | FRA; 15 | ITA; 16 | CAT; 15 | GER; 20 | NED; 10 | GBR; 4 | AUT; 10 | RSM; 19 | ARA; 23 | JPN; 21 | THA; Ret | AUS; 17 | MAL; 17 | VAL; 24 | 19th | 63 |
| 2023 | Moto3 | Honda | POR; 11 | ARG; 7 | AME; 11 | SPA; Ret | FRA; 12 | ITA; 10 | GER; 14 | NED; 11 | GBR; 14 | AUT; 14 | CAT; 7 | RSM; 6 | IND; 2 | JPN; 8 | INA; 12 | AUS; 17 | THA; 10 | MAL; Ret | QAT; 8 | VAL; 20 | 11th | 105 |

=== Supersport World Championship ===
==== Races by year ====
(key) (Races in bold indicate pole position, races in italics indicate fastest lap)

| Year | Bike | 1 | | 2 | | 3 | | 4 | | 5 | | 6 | | 7 | | 8 | | 9 | | 10 | | 11 | | 12 | | Pos | Pts |
| Year | Bike | R1 | R2 | R1 | R2 | R1 | R2 | R1 | R2 | R1 | R2 | R1 | R2 | R1 | R2 | R1 | R2 | R1 | R2 | R1 | R2 | R1 | R2 | R1 | R2 | Pos | Pts |
|---|---|---|---|---|---|---|---|---|---|---|---|---|---|---|---|---|---|---|---|---|---|---|---|---|---|---|---|
| 2024 | Honda | AUS; Ret | AUS; 21 | SPA; 25 | SPA; 25 | NED; 24 | NED; 6 | ITA; 26 | ITA; 22 | GBR; 20 | GBR; Ret | CZE; 19 | CZE; Ret | POR; 14 | POR; Ret | FRA; 27 | FRA; 13 | ITA; Ret | ITA; 27 | SPA; 18 | SPA; 19 | POR; 14 | POR; NC | SPA; 14 | SPA; 14 | 23rd | 21 |
| 2025 | Honda | AUS; 14 | AUS; 9 | POR; 27 | POR; Ret | NED; Ret | NED; Ret | ITA; Ret | ITA; 15 | CZE; 19 | CZE; 24 | EMI; 30 | EMI; NC | GBR; 16 | GBR; 20 | HUN; Ret | HUN; 14 | FRA; Ret | FRA; 22 | ARA; 22 | ARA; Ret | EST; 19 | EST; 21 | SPA; 15 | SPA; 14 | 25th | 15 |

=== FIM Endurance World Cup ===
| Year | Team | Bike | Tyre | Rider | Pts | TC |
|---|---|---|---|---|---|---|
| 2025 | (Italy) Honda No Limits | Honda CBR1000RR | **D** | (Japan) Kaito Toba (Italy) Gabriele Giannini (Italy) Roberto Tamburini (Italy) Edoardo Sintoni | 49 | 9th |

=== Suzuka 8 Hours ===
| Year | Class | Team | Co-riders | Bike | Pos |
|---|---|---|---|---|---|
| 2025 | **SST** | (Italy) Honda No Limits | (Italy) Gabriele Giannini (Japan) Akito Haga | Honda CBR1000RR-R | 31st |
| 2026 | **SST** | (Japan) Team Étoile | (Japan) Hikari Okubo (Japan) Motoharu Ito | BMW M1000RR | TBD |

=== All Japan Road Race Championship ===
==== Races by year ====
(key) (Races in bold indicate pole position; races in italics indicate fastest lap)

| Year | Class | Bike | 1 | 2 | 3 | 4 | 5 | 6 | Pos | Pts |
|---|---|---|---|---|---|---|---|---|---|---|
| 2026 | ST1000 | BMW | SUG | AUT | MOT1 | MOT2 | OKA | **SUZ**; 22† | 32nd | 0 |

- † – Rider did not finish the race, but was classified as he completed more than ~75% of the race distance.
