= Romano Fenati =

Italian motorcycle racer (born 1996)

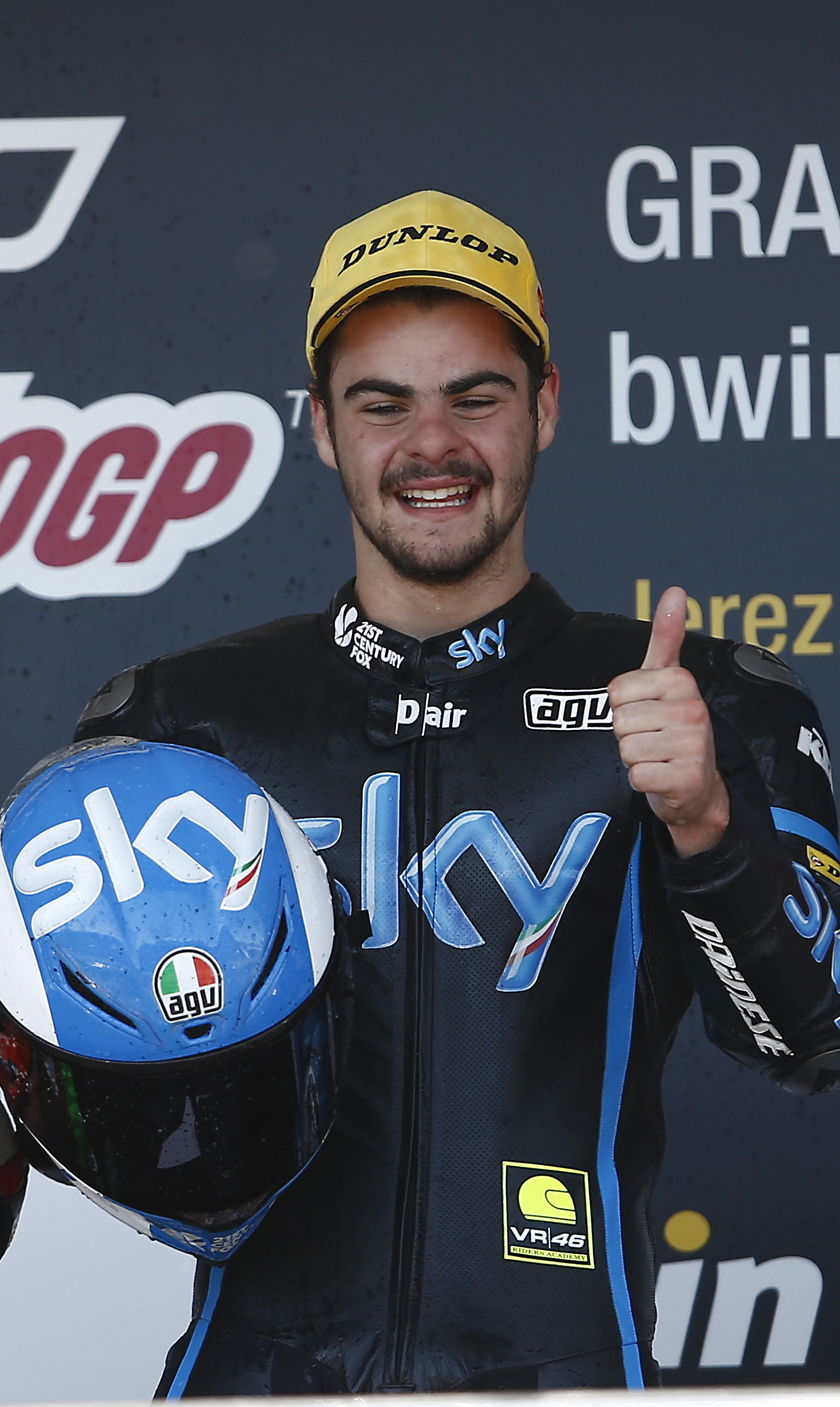
- Fenati in 2014
- Nationality: Italian
- Born: 15 January 1996 (age 30); Ascoli Piceno, Italy
Motorcycle racing career statistics
Moto2 World Championship
Active years	2018, 2022
Manufacturers	Kalex (2018); Boscoscuro (2022)
Championships	0
2022 championship position	27th (7 pts)
Starts / Wins / Podiums / Poles / F. laps / Points; 18 / 0 / 0 / 0 / 0 / 21
Moto3 World Championship
Active years	2012–2017, 2019–2021, 2023
Manufacturers	FTR Honda (2012–2013); KTM (2014–2016); Honda (2017, 2019), (2023); Husqvarna (2020–2021)
Championships	0
2023 championship position	20th (35 pts)
Starts / Wins / Podiums / Poles / F. laps / Points; 161 / 13 / 29 / 7 / 14 / 1250

Romano Fenati (born 15 January 1996) is an Italian former motorcycle racer who competed in the FIM Road Racing World Championship between 2012 and 2023 in the Moto3 and Moto2 categories.

He was European 125 cc Champion in 2011, championship runner-up of the Italian 125GP series, and also competed in the Spanish 125GP series.

Fenati competed in Moto3 between 2012 and 2023, winning thirteen races. He raced in Moto2 in 2018 and 2022, each time being released by his teams before the season ended. He finally left Moto3 after the 2023 season as he had reached the maximum permitted age of 28 years old.

Fenati's conduct has led to disciplinary action from teams and authorities. Amongst these is an incident during a Moto2 race in September 2018, when he pulled alongside rival Stefano Manzi at speed, reached across and grabbed Manzi's front brake lever. This dangerous action was punished by Fenati's racing licence being revoked for the rest of the season and by termination of his contract with the Marinelli Snipers team.

Fenati is amongst the riders appearing in the 2016 documentary film Il Mago Mancini ("Mancini, the Motorcycle Wizard") that describes the accomplishments of rider and constructor Guido Mancini.

== Career ==
=== Moto3 World Championship ===
==== Team Italia FMI (2012) ====
For the 2012 Moto3 season, Fenati signed with Team Italia FMI riding an FTR Honda. At Round 1 in Qatar, he finished second in his debut race. He then went on to claim his first victory at the second race of the season in Jerez, Spain. In doing so, Fenati became the first rider since Noboru Ueda in 1991 to take two podiums in his first two Grand Prix starts and the youngest ever rider in Grand Prix motorcycle racing history to lead the World Championship. He finished 6th in the championship.

==== San Carlo Team Italia (2013) ====
The 2013 season was disappointing for Fenati as he did not record any podium finishes, with his best position being fifth. He finished tenth in the final championship standings, with 73 points.

==== Sky Racing Team VR46 (2014–2016) ====
For the 2014 Moto3 season, Fenati signed with Valentino Rossi's Sky Racing Team by VR46. It was an up-and-down season for Fenati, as he scored four podiums in the first six races and ultimately recorded four wins during the season. However, inconsistent results ultimately left him in fifth position in the championship with 176 points.

The 2015 season was also an underperformance for Fenati. Though he maintained some consistency, finishing in the top-five in eight races, including a victory at Le Mans. Poor qualifying positions for Fenati resulted in the loss of vital points, and he finished the season with 176 points, as he did in 2014, but placed one position higher in the standings.

Fenati started the 2016 season with a pole position at Qatar. However, he only managed fourth in the race. He finished in 20th in Argentina, before his first win of the season in the United States. He was seventh at Jerez, before a second-place finish at Le Mans, losing out to Brad Binder by 0.099 seconds. Fenati qualified on pole at Mugello, but failed to finish the race. He was fourth in both Catalunya and Netherlands, before a pointless 18th-place finish in Germany. Fenati was dropped by Sky Racing VR46 in Austria as a disciplinary action for disagreeing with Uccio Salucci. On 16 August, the VR46 team terminated their contract with Romano for the 2016 and 2017 seasons, stating behavioural issues in conflict with team policy as the reason behind the split.

==== Marinelli Rivacold Snipers (2017) ====
In 2017, Fenati joined Marinelli Rivacold Snipers team and had his best season to date: three wins and five second places to finish as runner-up in the Moto3 championship.

=== Moto2 World Championship ===
==== Marinelli Snipers Moto2 (2018) ====
On 9 September 2018, at the 2018 San Marino Grand Prix, Fenati was immediately disqualified after grabbing the front brake lever of rival rider Stefano Manzi, which resulted in a two-race ban. His Marinelli Snipers team then terminated their contract with Fenati following the incident. In November 2018, it was announced that he would return for the 2019 season in the Moto3 class.

=== Return to Moto3 ===
==== VNE Snipers (2019) ====
Fenati competed for VNE Snipers team for the whole of the 2019 Moto3 season.

==== Sterilgarda Max Racing Team (2020–2021) ====
A high point of Fenati's time with the team was qualifying in pole position for the 2021 Austrian GP, a feat that he had last achieved at the British Grand Prix in 2017.

==== Rivacold Snipers Team (2023) ====
For the 2023 season, Fenati competed in Moto3 with Rivacold Snipers Team.

=== Return to Moto2 ===
==== Speed Up Racing (2022) ====
Fenati joined Speed Up Racing to compete in Moto2 for the 2022 season. After the first few races, in May 2022, Fenati was sacked from the team because of poor results.

=== Retirement and step down from motorcycle racing ===
After finishing the 2023 Moto3 season and reaching the maximum permitted age according to Moto3 rules, Fenati tried to find a new contract or offer from a new factory or team around the world. However, none of the teams wanted him due to the controversies he was involved in in 2015 and 2018. Finally, he decided to retire and step away from his motorcycle career.

== Controversies ==
Fenati has interfered with other riders a number of times. In the 2015 Argentine Grand Prix, he kicked Niklas Ajo during the warm-up and also turned Ajo's engine off during the practice start. As a consequence, he was forced to start the race at the back of the field. The following year, he was sacked from the VR46 Team for undisclosed disciplinary reasons.

In September 2018, Fenati pulled Stefano Manzi's front brake lever during a race when both were travelling at more than 200 km/h (120 mph). He apologised but was dropped from the Marinelli Snipers Team for the offence. His future contract to ride for Forward Racing using MV Agusta machines in 2019 was cancelled on 11 September. On 12 September, he announced his immediate retirement from racing, while suggesting that Manzi's own actions were partially responsible for the incident. An Italian consumer-rights group, Codacons, subsequently stated that it had raised the matter with local prosecutors and asked them to investigate "any relevant criminal offences, including that of attempted murder". The authorities later determined that a charge of "private violence", similar to a road rage incident, was more appropriate.

On 21 September, in addition to a preliminary two-race ban imposed earlier, after meeting with the FIM at their headquarters in Mies, Switzerland, on 18 September, it was announced that Fenati's racing licence was revoked for the remainder of the 2018 season. He made a comeback to Moto3 for the 2019 season.

== Career statistics ==
=== Grand Prix motorcycle racing ===
==== By season ====
Season	Class	Motorcycle	Team	Race	Win	Podium	Pole	FLap	Pts	Plcd
2012	Moto3	FTR Honda	Team Italia FMI	17	1	4	0	2	136	6th
2013	Moto3	FTR Honda	San Carlo Team Italia	17	0	0	0	0	73	10th
2014	Moto3	KTM	Sky Racing Team by VR46	18	4	6	0	3	176	5th
2015	Moto3	KTM	Sky Racing Team VR46	18	1	3	1	1	176	4th
2016	Moto3	KTM	Sky Racing Team VR46	9	1	2	2	2	93	10th
2017	Moto3	Honda	Marinelli Rivacold Snipers	18	3	8	1	3	248	**2nd**
2018	Moto2	Kalex	Marinelli Snipers Moto2	12	0	0	0	0	14	21st
2019	Moto3	Honda	VNE Snipers	16	1	1	0	2	76	16th
2020	Moto3	Husqvarna	Sterilgarda Max Racing Team	15	1	1	0	1	77	14th
2021	Moto3	Husqvarna	Sterilgarda Max Racing Team	18	1	4	3	1	160	5th
2022	Moto2	Boscoscuro	Speed Up Racing	6	0	0	0	0	7	27th
2023	Moto3	Honda	Rivacold Snipers Team	15	0	0	0	0	35	20th
Total				**179**	**13**	**29**	**7**	**15**	**1271**	

==== By class ====
Class	Seasons	1st GP	1st Pod	1st Win	Race	Win	Podiums	Pole	FLap	Pts	WChmp
Moto3	2012–2017, 2019–2021, 2023	2012 Qatar	2012 Qatar	2012 Spain	161	13	29	7	14	1250	0
Moto2	2018, 2022	2018 Qatar			18	0	0	0	0	21	0
Total	2012–2023				**179**	**13**	**29**	**7**	**14**	**1271**	**0**

==== Races by year ====
(key) (Races in bold indicate pole position, races in italics indicate fastest lap)

Year	Class	Bike	1	2	3	4	5	6	7	8	9	10	11	12	13	14	15	16	17	18	19	20	Pos	Pts
2012	Moto3	FTR Honda	QAT; 2	SPA; 1	POR; Ret	FRA; Ret	CAT; 9	GBR; 7	NED; 12	GER; 24	ITA; 2	INP; 5	CZE; 8	RSM; 3	ARA; Ret	JPN; 10	MAL; 20	AUS; 6	VAL; 18				6th	136
2013	Moto3	FTR Honda	QAT; 15	AME; Ret	SPA; 9	FRA; 7	ITA; Ret	CAT; 15	NED; 14	GER; 13	INP; 9	CZE; 18	GBR; 12	RSM; 10	ARA; 8	MAL; 9	AUS; 14	JPN; 5	VAL; 11				10th	73
2014	Moto3	KTM	QAT; 12	AME; 2	ARG; 1	SPA; 1	FRA; Ret	ITA; 1	CAT; 5	NED; 18	GER; Ret	INP; 2	CZE; 11	GBR; 16	RSM; 11	ARA; 1	JPN; 7	AUS; Ret	MAL; Ret	VAL; 14			5th	176
2015	Moto3	KTM	QAT; Ret	AME; 8	ARG; 8	SPA; 6	FRA; 1	ITA; 3	CAT; 8	NED; 5	GER; 4	INP; 4	CZE; 6	GBR; 12	RSM; 4	ARA; 3	**JPN**; 28	AUS; 6	MAL; 5	VAL; Ret			4th	176
2016	Moto3	KTM	**QAT**; 4	ARG; 20	AME; 1	SPA; 7	FRA; 2	**ITA**; Ret	CAT; 4	NED; 4	GER; 18	AUT; DNS	CZE	GBR	RSM	ARA	JPN	AUS	MAL	VAL			10th	93
2017	Moto3	Honda	QAT; 5	ARG; 7	AME; 1	SPA; 2	FRA; Ret	ITA; 13	CAT; 2	NED; 2	GER; 2	CZE; 2	AUT; 13	**GBR**; 7	RSM; 1	ARA; 10	JPN; 1	AUS; 6	MAL; 7	VAL; 4			2nd	248
2018	Moto2	Kalex	QAT; 24	ARG; 19	AME; 16	SPA; Ret	FRA; 7	ITA; Ret	CAT; Ret	NED; Ret	GER; 16	CZE; Ret	AUT; 11	GBR; C	RSM; DSQ	ARA	THA	JPN	AUS	MAL	VAL		21st	14
2019	Moto3	Honda	QAT; 9	ARG; 16	AME; Ret	SPA; Ret	FRA; Ret	ITA; Ret	CAT; 7	NED; 11	GER; 4	CZE; 8	AUT; 1	GBR; Ret	RSM; DNS	ARA	THA	JPN; Ret	AUS; 12	MAL; 11	VAL; 17		16th	76
2020	Moto3	Husqvarna	QAT; 17	SPA; 13	ANC; 12	CZE; 9	AUT; 17	STY; 17	RSM; 8	EMI; 1	CAT; 6	FRA; Ret	ARA; 4	TER; 19	EUR; 13	VAL; 12	POR; 20						14th	77
2021	Moto3	Husqvarna	QAT; 11	DOH; 10	POR; 7	SPA; 2	FRA; 10	ITA; 6	CAT; 11	GER; 13	NED; 3	STY; 3	**AUT**; 5	**GBR**; 1	ARA; 14	**RSM**; Ret	AME; 12	EMI; 7	ALR; 7	VAL; 12			5th	160
2022	Moto2	Boscoscuro	QAT; 15	INA; 19	ARG; 18	AME; 15	POR; 11	SPA; Ret	FRA	ITA	CAT	GER	NED	GBR	AUT	RSM	ARA	JPN	THA	AUS	MAL	VAL	27th	7
2023	Moto3	Honda	POR; 19	ARG; 13	AME; 16	SPA; 11	FRA; 19	ITA; 17	GER; 18	NED; 8	GBR; 10	AUT; 17	CAT; 14	RSM; 10	IND; DNS	JPN	INA	AUS	THA	MAL; Ret	QAT; 11	VAL; 16	20th	35

Sporting positions
Preceded by Maverick Viñales	European 125cc Champion; 2011	Succeeded by Matteo Ferrari
