= Jakub Kornfeil =

Czech motorcycle racer

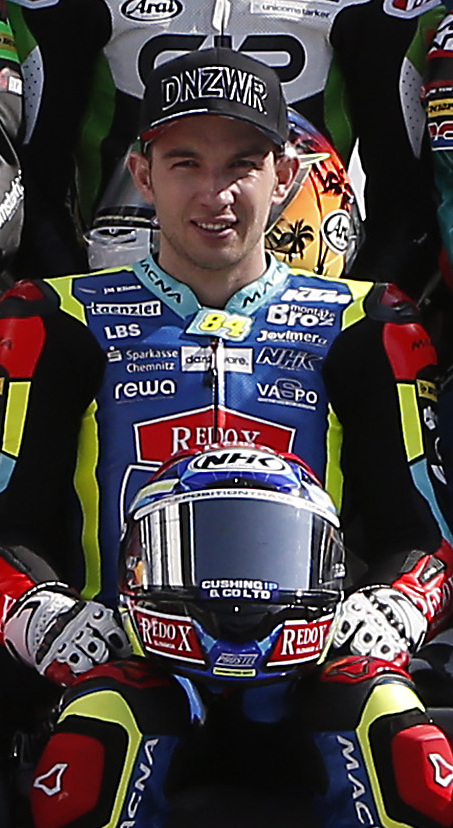
- Kornfeil in 2019
- Nationality: Czech
- Born: 8 April 1993 (age 33); Kyjov, Czech Republic
Motorcycle racing career statistics
Moto3 World Championship
Active years	2012–2019
Manufacturers	FTR Honda, Kalex KTM, KTM, Honda, Peugeot
Championships	0
2019 championship position	14th (78 pts)
Starts / Wins / Podiums / Poles / F. laps / Points; 143 / 0 / 5 / 1 / 2 / 657
125cc World Championship
Active years	2009–2011
Manufacturers	Loncin, Aprilia
Championships	0
2011 championship position	12th (72 pts)
Starts / Wins / Podiums / Poles / F. laps / Points; 39 / 0 / 0 / 0 / 0 / 100
MotoE World Championship
Active years	2020
Manufacturers	Energica
Championships	0
2020 championship position	18th (15 pts)
Starts / Wins / Podiums / Poles / F. laps / Points; 7 / 0 / 0 / 0 / 0 / 15

Jakub Kornfeil (born 8 April 1993) is a Grand Prix motorcycle racer from the Czech Republic. Until 2019, he competed in the Moto3 World Championship. During 2020 he raced for WithU Motorsport in the MotoE World Cup. He was the winner of Red Bull MotoGP Rookies Cup in 2009.

Kornfeil is a competitive jet surfer, who, in 2015, became the first ever MotoSurf GP World Champion.

== Career ==
=== Early career ===
Born in Kyjov, Kornfeil started racing competitively in supermoto from the age of eight years, winning the 65 cc championship in 2002. Championships at national and European level in minibikes followed, as well as the Czech Republic 125GP Championship in 2007, before Kornfeil moved into the Red Bull Rookies Cup in 2008. Kornfeil finished eight of the season's ten races in the top-ten places, as he finished ninth overall, tying on points with Daniel Ruiz. His second season in the championship was more successful, with top-eight finishes in every race, with three wins in the final four races enabling him to overhaul Sturla Fagerhaug by just two points. He also finished fourth in the Italian 125GP championship.

=== 125cc World Championship ===
After securing the Red Bull Rookies Cup, Kornfeil stepped up to Grand Prix level, making five appearances in the class towards the end of the season with the Loncin team, replacing Alexis Masbou. Kornfeil finished four of the races with a best result of 19th at the Malaysian Grand Prix.

Kornfeil and Tomoyoshi Koyama both moved from the Loncin team to make up Racing Team Germany's lineup for the 2010 season. Although Koyama outscored his much less experienced team-mate, Kornfeil amassed 28 points from nine points-scoring finishes to end up 17th in the final championship standings. His best result in the season was a fifth-place finish at his home Grand Prix which was held in damp conditions.

=== Moto3 World Championship ===
In 2015, Kornfeil achieved his best result with a second-place finish in wet conditions at Silverstone. He added another podium finish at Valencia, as he finished twelfth in the final championship standings. In 2016, Kornfeil achieved his best result in championship with an eighth place, he added another podium finish in Malaysia. In Czech Republic, 2018 he added a pole position and podium finish, and in France of the same year he was known for his stunt jump after Enea Bastianini crashed.

== Career statistics ==
=== Red Bull MotoGP Rookies Cup ===
==== Races by year ====
(key) (Races in bold indicate pole position, races in italics indicate fastest lap)

Year	1	2	3	4	5	6	7	8	9	10	Pos	Pts
2008	SPA1; 8	SPA2; 9	POR; 19	FRA; 9	ITA; 6	GBR; 7	NED; 10	GER; Ret	CZE1; 10	CZE2; 6	9th	63
2009	SPA1; 8	SPA2; 6	ITA; 2	NED; 5	GER; 1	GBR; 1	CZE1; 8	CZE2; 1			1st	132

=== Grand Prix motorcycle racing ===
==== By season ====
Season	Class	Motorcycle	Team	Race	Win	Podium	Pole	FLap	Pts	Plcd
2009	125cc	Loncin	Loncin Racing	5	0	0	0	0	0	NC
2010	125cc	Aprilia	Racing Team Germany	17	0	0	0	0	28	17th
2011	125cc	Aprilia	Ongetta-Centro Seta	17	0	0	0	0	72	12th
2012	Moto3	FTR Honda	Redox-Ongetta-Centro Seta	17	0	0	0	1	71	15th
2013	Moto3	Kalex KTM	Redox-RW Racing GP	17	0	0	0	0	68	11th
2014	Moto3	KTM	Calvo Team	18	0	0	0	1	97	12th
2015	Moto3	KTM	Drive M7 SIC	18	0	2	0	0	89	12th
2016	Moto3	Honda	Drive M7 SIC Racing Team	18	0	1	0	0	112	8th
2017	Moto3	Peugeot	Peugeot MC Saxoprint	18	0	0	0	0	26	22nd
2018	Moto3	KTM	Redox PrüstelGP	18	0	1	1	0	116	8th
2019	Moto3	KTM	Redox PrüstelGP	19	0	1	0	0	78	14th
2020	MotoE	Energica	WithU Motorsport	7	0	0	0	0	15	18th
Total				**189**	**0**	**5**	**1**	**2**	**772**	

==== By class ====
Class	Seasons	1st GP	1st Pod	1st Win	Race	Win	Podiums	Pole	FLap	Pts	WChmp
125cc	2009–2011	2009 San Marino			39	0	0	0	0	100	0
Moto3	2012–2019	2012 Qatar	2015 Great Britain		143	0	5	1	2	657	0
MotoE	2020	2020 Spain			7	0	0	0	0	15	0
Total	2009–2020				**189**	**0**	**5**	**1**	**2**	**772**	**0**

==== Races by year ====
(key) (Races in bold indicate pole position, races in italics indicate fastest lap)

Year	Class	Bike	1	2	3	4	5	6	7	8	9	10	11	12	13	14	15	16	17	18	19	Pos	Pts
2009	125cc	Loncin	QAT	JPN	SPA	FRA	ITA	CAT	NED	GER	GBR	CZE	INP	RSM; 28	POR; 25	AUS; 23	MAL; 19	VAL; Ret				NC	0
2010	125cc	Aprilia	QAT; 19	SPA; 14	FRA; 19	ITA; 17	GBR; 20	NED; 15	CAT; 16	GER; 17	CZE; 5	INP; 14	RSM; 16	ARA; 14	JPN; Ret	MAL; 14	AUS; 14	POR; 11	VAL; 15			17th	28
2011	125cc	Aprilia	QAT; 23	SPA; 7	POR; 13	FRA; 21	CAT; 10	GBR; 9	NED; 16	ITA; 10	GER; 13	CZE; 7	INP; 10	RSM; 12	ARA; 13	JPN; 11	AUS; 13	MAL; 8	VAL; 24			12th	72
2012	Moto3	FTR Honda	QAT; 15	SPA; Ret	POR; 10	FRA; Ret	CAT; 11	GBR; 11	NED; 13	GER; 10	ITA; 8	INP; 8	CZE; 6	RSM; 15	ARA; 11	JPN; 15	MAL; 16	AUS; 13	VAL; 7			15th	71
2013	Moto3	Kalex KTM	QAT; 22	AME; 10	SPA; 5	FRA; 6	ITA; Ret	CAT; Ret	NED; 16	GER; 11	INP; 10	CZE; 8	GBR; 9	RSM; 13	ARA; Ret	MAL; 13	AUS; 12	JPN; 11	VAL; 16			11th	68
2014	Moto3	KTM	QAT; 6	AME; 5	ARG; 20	SPA; 6	FRA; 10	ITA; Ret	CAT; 15	NED; 11	GER; 11	INP; 10	CZE; 14	GBR; 5	RSM; 17	ARA; 5	JPN; Ret	AUS; 8	MAL; 8	VAL; 13		12th	97
2015	Moto3	KTM	QAT; 17	AME; 11	ARG; 14	SPA; Ret	FRA; 6	ITA; 16	CAT; Ret	NED; 20	GER; 14	INP; 22	CZE; 9	GBR; 2	RSM; 17	ARA; 14	JPN; 12	AUS; 5	MAL; 6	VAL; 3		12th	89
2016	Moto3	Honda	QAT; 10	ARG; 9	AME; 11	SPA; 5	FRA; 9	ITA; 17	CAT; 10	NED; 13	GER; 4	AUT; 19	CZE; 6	GBR; 15	RSM; 5	ARA; Ret	JPN; 13	AUS; Ret	MAL; 2	VAL; 7		8th	112
2017	Moto3	Peugeot	QAT; 20	ARG; 18	AME; 23	SPA; 18	FRA; 11	ITA; 20	CAT; 22	NED; 17	GER; 18	CZE; 20	AUT; 20	GBR; 23	RSM; 7	ARA; 25	JPN; 8	AUS; 12	MAL; 21	VAL; 18		22nd	26
2018	Moto3	KTM	QAT; 9	ARG; 14	AME; 7	SPA; 8	FRA; 6	ITA; 23	CAT; 11	NED; 5	GER; 7	**CZE**; 3	AUT; 13	GBR; C	RSM; 5	ARA; 11	THA; 10	JPN; 10	AUS; 9	MAL; 20	VAL; 15	8th	116
2019	Moto3	KTM	QAT; 10	ARG; 24	AME; Ret	SPA; 7	FRA; 9	ITA; 14	CAT; 10	NED; 3	GER; 10	CZE; 9	AUT; 8	GBR; 16	RSM; 12	ARA; 15	THA; 12	JPN; Ret	AUS; 15	MAL; 17	VAL; 15	14th	78
2020	MotoE	Energica	SPA; 16	ANC; 12	RSM; 16	EMI1; 12	EMI2; 13	FRA1; 13	FRA2; 15													18th	15

Sporting positions
Preceded by J. D. Beach	Red Bull MotoGP Rookies Cup champion 2009	Succeeded by Jacob Gagne
