= 2018 Qatar motorcycle Grand Prix =

2018 Qatar Grand Prix
Race details
- Race 1 of 19 races in the 2018 Grand Prix motorcycle racing season
- Date: 18 March 2018
- Official name: Grand Prix of Qatar
- Location: Losail International Circuit
- Course: Permanent racing facility; 5.380 km (3.343 mi)

MotoGP
Pole position
Rider	(France) Johann Zarco	Yamaha
Time	1:53.680	
Fastest lap
Rider	(Italy) Andrea Dovizioso	Ducati
Time	1:55.242 on lap 19	
Podium
First	(Italy) Andrea Dovizioso	Ducati
Second	(Spain) Marc Márquez	Honda
Third	(Italy) Valentino Rossi	Yamaha

Moto2
Pole position
Rider	(Spain) Álex Márquez	Kalex
Time	2:00.299	
Fastest lap
Rider	(Italy) Lorenzo Baldassarri	Kalex
Time	2:00.303 on lap 4	
Podium
First	(Italy) Francesco Bagnaia	Kalex
Second	(Italy) Lorenzo Baldassarri	Kalex
Third	(Spain) Álex Márquez	Kalex

Moto3
Pole position
Rider	(Italy) Niccolò Antonelli	Honda
Time	2:06.364	
Fastest lap
Rider	(Spain) Arón Canet	Honda
Time	2:06.373 on lap 4	
Podium
First	(Spain) Jorge Martín	Honda
Second	(Spain) Arón Canet	Honda
Third	(Italy) Lorenzo Dalla Porta	Honda

The 2018 Qatar motorcycle Grand Prix was the first round of the 2018 MotoGP season. It was held at the Losail International Circuit in Doha on 18 March 2018.

== Classification ==
=== MotoGP ===
Pos.	No.	Rider	Team	Manufacturer	Laps	Time/Retired	Grid	Points
1	4	(Italy) Andrea Dovizioso	Ducati Team	Ducati	22	42:34.654	5	25
2	93	(Spain) Marc Márquez	Repsol Honda Team	Honda	22	+0.027	2	20
3	46	(Italy) Valentino Rossi	Movistar Yamaha MotoGP	Yamaha	22	+0.797	8	16
4	35	(United Kingdom) Cal Crutchlow	LCR Honda Castrol	Honda	22	+2.881	4	13
5	9	(Italy) Danilo Petrucci	Alma Pramac Racing	Ducati	22	+3.821	3	11
6	25	(Spain) Maverick Viñales	Movistar Yamaha MotoGP	Yamaha	22	+3.888	12	10
7	26	(Spain) Dani Pedrosa	Repsol Honda Team	Honda	22	+4.621	7	9
8	5	(France) Johann Zarco	Monster Yamaha Tech 3	Yamaha	22	+7.112	1	8
9	29	(Italy) Andrea Iannone	Team Suzuki Ecstar	Suzuki	22	+12.957	11	7
10	43	(Australia) Jack Miller	Alma Pramac Racing	Ducati	22	+14.594	10	6
11	53	(Spain) Tito Rabat	Reale Avintia Racing	Ducati	22	+15.181	16	5
12	21	(Italy) Franco Morbidelli	EG 0,0 Marc VDS	Honda	22	+16.274	14	4
13	19	(Spain) Álvaro Bautista	Ángel Nieto Team	Ducati	22	+19.788	21	3
14	55	(Malaysia) Hafizh Syahrin	Monster Yamaha Tech 3	Yamaha	22	+20.299	15	2
15	17	(Czech Republic) Karel Abraham	Ángel Nieto Team	Ducati	22	+23.287	19	1
16	12	(Switzerland) Thomas Lüthi	EG 0,0 Marc VDS	Honda	22	+24.189	18	
17	30	(Japan) Takaaki Nakagami	LCR Honda Idemitsu	Honda	22	+24.554	23	
18	38	(United Kingdom) Bradley Smith	Red Bull KTM Factory Racing	KTM	22	+31.704	20	
19	41	(Spain) Aleix Espargaró	Aprilia Racing Team Gresini	Aprilia	22	+34.712	13	
20	45	(United Kingdom) Scott Redding	Aprilia Racing Team Gresini	Aprilia	22	+37.641	17	
21	10	(Belgium) Xavier Siméon	Reale Avintia Racing	Ducati	22	+46.706	24	
Ret	44	(Spain) Pol Espargaró	Red Bull KTM Factory Racing	KTM	15	Electronics	22	
Ret	42	(Spain) Álex Rins	Team Suzuki Ecstar	Suzuki	12	Accident	6	
Ret	99	(Spain) Jorge Lorenzo	Ducati Team	Ducati	12	Accident	9	

=== Moto2 ===
Pos.	No.	Rider	Manufacturer	Laps	Time/Retired	Grid	Points
1	42	(Italy) Francesco Bagnaia	Kalex	20	40:19.802	3	25
2	7	(Italy) Lorenzo Baldassarri	Kalex	20	+0.112	2	20
3	73	(Spain) Álex Márquez	Kalex	20	+5.625	1	16
4	54	(Italy) Mattia Pasini	Kalex	20	+6.657	8	13
5	44	(Portugal) Miguel Oliveira	KTM	20	+10.296	4	11
6	41	(South Africa) Brad Binder	KTM	20	+10.344	13	10
7	23	(Germany) Marcel Schrötter	Kalex	20	+11.419	9	9
8	97	(Spain) Xavi Vierge	Kalex	20	+11.516	11	8
9	10	(Italy) Luca Marini	Kalex	20	+20.690	17	7
10	9	(Spain) Jorge Navarro	Kalex	20	+20.961	7	6
11	36	(Spain) Joan Mir	Kalex	20	+23.025	24	5
12	87	(Australia) Remy Gardner	Tech 3	20	+30.292	12	4
13	40	(Spain) Héctor Barberá	Kalex	20	+30.299	19	3
14	24	(Italy) Simone Corsi	Kalex	20	+30.732	14	2
15	77	(Switzerland) Dominique Aegerter	KTM	20	+30.870	21	1
16	32	(Spain) Isaac Viñales	Kalex	20	+31.052	18	
17	52	(United Kingdom) Danny Kent	Speed Up	20	+31.958	6	
18	64	(Netherlands) Bo Bendsneyder	Tech 3	20	+32.382	20	
19	5	(Italy) Andrea Locatelli	Kalex	20	+35.228	23	
20	20	(France) Fabio Quartararo	Speed Up	20	+35.357	16	
21	45	(Japan) Tetsuta Nagashima	Kalex	20	+35.969	26	
22	4	(South Africa) Steven Odendaal	NTS	20	+42.545	22	
23	89	(Malaysia) Khairul Idham Pawi	Kalex	20	+42.776	25	
24	13	(Italy) Romano Fenati	Kalex	20	+44.562	5	
25	16	(United States) Joe Roberts	NTS	20	+56.077	27	
26	62	(Italy) Stefano Manzi	Suter	20	+1:01.581	28	
27	95	(France) Jules Danilo	Kalex	20	+1:01.853	29	
28	63	(Malaysia) Zulfahmi Khairuddin	Kalex	20	+1:11.618	32	
29	21	(Italy) Federico Fuligni	Kalex	20	+1:20.148	31	
30	51	(Brazil) Eric Granado	Suter	20	+1:26.192	30	
Ret	22	(United Kingdom) Sam Lowes	KTM	10	Accident	10	
Ret	27	(Spain) Iker Lecuona	KTM	7	Engine	15	
OFFICIAL MOTO2 REPORT

=== Moto3 ===
Pos.	No.	Rider	Manufacturer	Laps	Time/Retired	Grid	Points
1	88	(Spain) Jorge Martín	Honda	18	38:18.207	2	25
2	44	(Spain) Arón Canet	Honda	18	+0.023	7	20
3	48	(Italy) Lorenzo Dalla Porta	Honda	18	+6.746	9	16
4	23	(Italy) Niccolò Antonelli	Honda	18	+6.791	1	13
5	19	(Argentina) Gabriel Rodrigo	KTM	18	+6.850	3	11
6	21	(Italy) Fabio Di Giannantonio	Honda	18	+6.916	16	10
7	27	(Japan) Kaito Toba	Honda	18	+6.946	5	9
8	71	(Japan) Ayumu Sasaki	Honda	18	+6.998	4	8
9	84	(Czech Republic) Jakub Kornfeil	KTM	18	+7.156	11	7
10	16	(Italy) Andrea Migno	KTM	18	+7.699	14	6
11	7	(Malaysia) Adam Norrodin	Honda	18	+7.753	17	5
12	5	(Spain) Jaume Masiá	KTM	18	+8.026	13	4
13	22	(Japan) Kazuki Masaki	KTM	18	+8.829	19	3
14	12	(Italy) Marco Bezzecchi	KTM	18	+21.838	6	2
15	42	(Spain) Marcos Ramírez	KTM	18	+26.912	15	1
16	10	(Italy) Dennis Foggia	KTM	18	+26.981	24	
17	14	(Italy) Tony Arbolino	Honda	18	+33.401	25	
18	41	(Thailand) Nakarin Atiratphuvapat	Honda	18	+33.446	26	
19	76	(Kazakhstan) Makar Yurchenko	KTM	18	+33.622	23	
Ret	17	(United Kingdom) John McPhee	KTM	17	Accident	12	
Ret	72	(Spain) Alonso López	Honda	11	Accident	21	
Ret	11	(Belgium) Livio Loi	KTM	11	Gear Shifter	18	
Ret	8	(Italy) Nicolò Bulega	KTM	10	Accident	22	
Ret	33	(Italy) Enea Bastianini	Honda	5	Accident	10	
Ret	65	(Germany) Philipp Öttl	KTM	3	Collision	8	
Ret	40	(South Africa) Darryn Binder	KTM	3	Collision	20	
DNS	75	(Spain) Albert Arenas	KTM		Did not start		
DNS	24	(Japan) Tatsuki Suzuki	Honda		Did not start		
OFFICIAL MOTO3 REPORT

- Albert Arenas suffered a broken right collarbone in a crash during Sunday warm-up and withdrew from the event.
- Tatsuki Suzuki suffered a broken right forearm in a crash during Friday practice and withdrew from the event.

== Championship standings after the race ==
=== MotoGP ===
Pos.	Rider	Points
1	(Italy) Andrea Dovizioso	25
2	(Spain) Marc Márquez	20
3	(Italy) Valentino Rossi	16
4	(United Kingdom) Cal Crutchlow	13
5	(Italy) Danilo Petrucci	11
6	(Spain) Maverick Viñales	10
7	(Spain) Dani Pedrosa	9
8	(France) Johann Zarco	8
9	(Italy) Andrea Iannone	7
10	(Australia) Jack Miller	6

=== Moto2 ===
Pos.	Rider	Points
1	(Italy) Francesco Bagnaia	25
2	(Italy) Lorenzo Baldassarri	20
3	(Spain) Álex Márquez	16
4	(Italy) Mattia Pasini	13
5	(Portugal) Miguel Oliveira	11
6	(South Africa) Brad Binder	10
7	(Germany) Marcel Schrötter	9
8	(Spain) Xavi Vierge	8
9	(Italy) Luca Marini	7
10	(Spain) Jorge Navarro	6

=== Moto3 ===
Pos.	Rider	Points
1	(Spain) Jorge Martín	25
2	(Spain) Arón Canet	20
3	(Italy) Lorenzo Dalla Porta	16
4	(Italy) Niccolò Antonelli	13
5	(Argentina) Gabriel Rodrigo	11
6	(Italy) Fabio Di Giannantonio	10
7	(Japan) Kaito Toba	9
8	(Japan) Ayumu Sasaki	8
9	(Czech Republic) Jakub Kornfeil	7
10	(Italy) Andrea Migno	6

Previous race: 2017 Valencian Grand Prix	FIM Grand Prix World Championship; 2018 season	Next race: 2018 Argentine Grand Prix
Previous race: 2017 Qatar Grand Prix	Qatar motorcycle Grand Prix	Next race: 2019 Qatar Grand Prix
