= 2017 Valencian Community motorcycle Grand Prix =

2017 Valencian Community Grand Prix
Race details
- Race 18 of 18 races in the 2017 Grand Prix motorcycle racing season
- Date: 12 November 2017
- Official name: Gran Premio Motul de la Comunitat Valenciana
- Location: Circuit Ricardo Tormo
- Course: Permanent racing facility; 4.005 km (2.489 mi)

MotoGP
Pole position
Rider	(Spain) Marc Márquez	Honda
Time	1:29.897	
Fastest lap
Rider	(France) Johann Zarco	Yamaha
Time	1:31.576 on lap 4	
Podium
First	(Spain) Dani Pedrosa	Honda
Second	(France) Johann Zarco	Yamaha
Third	(Spain) Marc Márquez	Honda

Moto2
Pole position
Rider	(Spain) Álex Márquez	Kalex
Time	1:35.050	
Fastest lap
Rider	(Italy) Franco Morbidelli	Kalex
Time	1:35.628 on lap 7	
Podium
First	(Portugal) Miguel Oliveira	KTM
Second	(Italy) Franco Morbidelli	Kalex
Third	(South Africa) Brad Binder	KTM

Moto3
Pole position
Rider	(Spain) Jorge Martín	Honda
Time	1:38.428	
Fastest lap
Rider	(Spain) Marcos Ramírez	KTM
Time	1:39.109 on lap 2	
Podium
First	(Spain) Jorge Martín	Honda
Second	(Spain) Joan Mir	Honda
Third	(Spain) Marcos Ramírez	KTM

The 2017 Valencian Community motorcycle Grand Prix was the eighteenth and final round of the 2017 MotoGP season. It was held at the Circuit Ricardo Tormo in Valencia on 12 November 2017.

In the MotoGP class, Dani Pedrosa took the victory after overtaking Johann Zarco on the final lap, while Marc Márquez clinched his fourth premier class title and sixth overall with a third place finish after rival Andrea Dovizioso crashed out. The victory would prove to be Pedrosa's last in MotoGP, as well as his final podium finish.

In the Moto3 class, this was the final race for both the Peugeot and Mahindra MGP3O chassis packages, as the teams that used those bikes, CIP, Ángel Nieto Team, and Redox PrüstelGP all switched to KTM for 2018.

== Classification ==
=== MotoGP ===
Pos.	No.	Rider	Team	Manufacturer	Laps	Time/Retired	Grid	Points
1	26	(Spain) Dani Pedrosa	Repsol Honda Team	Honda	30	46:08.125	5	25
2	5	(France) Johann Zarco	Monster Yamaha Tech 3	Yamaha	30	+0.337	2	20
3	93	(Spain) Marc Márquez	Repsol Honda Team	Honda	30	+10.861	1	16
4	42	(Spain) Álex Rins	Team Suzuki Ecstar	Suzuki	30	+13.567	10	13
5	46	(Italy) Valentino Rossi	Movistar Yamaha MotoGP	Yamaha	30	+13.817	7	11
6	29	(Italy) Andrea Iannone	Team Suzuki Ecstar	Suzuki	30	+14.516	3	10
7	43	(Australia) Jack Miller	EG 0,0 Marc VDS	Honda	30	+17.087	12	9
8	35	(United Kingdom) Cal Crutchlow	LCR Honda	Honda	30	+17.230	16	8
9	51	(Italy) Michele Pirro	Ducati Team	Ducati	30	+25.942	6	7
10	53	(Spain) Tito Rabat	EG 0,0 Marc VDS	Honda	30	+27.020	14	6
11	38	(United Kingdom) Bradley Smith	Red Bull KTM Factory Racing	KTM	30	+30.835	17	5
12	25	(Spain) Maverick Viñales	Movistar Yamaha MotoGP	Yamaha	30	+35.012	13	4
13	9	(Italy) Danilo Petrucci	Octo Pramac Racing	Ducati	30	+38.076	15	3
14	17	(Czech Republic) Karel Abraham	Pull&Bear Aspar Team	Ducati	30	+41.988	18	2
15	8	(Spain) Héctor Barberá	Reale Avintia Racing	Ducati	30	+47.703	20	1
16	76	(France) Loris Baz	Reale Avintia Racing	Ducati	30	+47.709	23	
17	60	(Netherlands) Michael van der Mark	Monster Yamaha Tech 3	Yamaha	30	+52.134	25	
Ret	44	(Spain) Pol Espargaró	Red Bull KTM Factory Racing	KTM	25	Accident	11 (Note: Pit lane start penalty.)	
Ret	4	(Italy) Andrea Dovizioso	Ducati Team	Ducati	25	Retired	9	
Ret	99	(Spain) Jorge Lorenzo	Ducati Team	Ducati	24	Accident	4	
Ret	22	(United Kingdom) Sam Lowes	Aprilia Racing Team Gresini	Aprilia	22	Accident	24	
Ret	19	(Spain) Álvaro Bautista	Pull&Bear Aspar Team	Ducati	14	Accident	21	
Ret	45	(United Kingdom) Scott Redding	Octo Pramac Racing	Ducati	4	Accident	22	
Ret	41	(Spain) Aleix Espargaró	Aprilia Racing Team Gresini	Aprilia	3	Accident	8	
Ret	36	(Finland) Mika Kallio	Red Bull KTM Factory Racing	KTM	2	Accident	19	

=== Moto2 ===
Pos.	No.	Rider	Manufacturer	Laps	Time/Retired	Grid	Points
1	44	(Portugal) Miguel Oliveira	KTM	27	43:15.843	4	25
2	21	(Italy) Franco Morbidelli	Kalex	27	+2.154	2	20
3	41	(South Africa) Brad Binder	KTM	27	+4.181	5	16
4	42	(Italy) Francesco Bagnaia	Kalex	27	+11.181	8	13
5	73	(Spain) Álex Márquez	Kalex	27	+12.146	1	11
6	55	(Malaysia) Hafizh Syahrin	Kalex	27	+14.595	11	10
7	30	(Japan) Takaaki Nakagami	Kalex	27	+18.446	7	9
8	40	(France) Fabio Quartararo	Kalex	27	+22.188	16	8
9	24	(Italy) Simone Corsi	Speed Up	27	+23.592	19	7
10	77	(Switzerland) Dominique Aegerter	Suter	27	+23.751	6	6
11	49	(Spain) Axel Pons	Kalex	27	+27.388	12	5
12	32	(Spain) Isaac Viñales	Kalex	27	+29.688	15	4
13	23	(Germany) Marcel Schrötter	Suter	27	+31.442	10	3
14	37	(Spain) Augusto Fernández	Speed Up	27	+32.933	21	2
15	7	(Italy) Lorenzo Baldassarri	Kalex	27	+33.150	31	1
16	5	(Italy) Andrea Locatelli	Kalex	27	+34.335	25 (Note: 3-place grid penalty.)	
17	51	(Brazil) Eric Granado	Kalex	27	+34.731	18	
18	27	(Spain) Iker Lecuona	Kalex	27	+39.828	22	
19	54	(Italy) Mattia Pasini	Kalex	27	+39.940	3	
20	57	(Spain) Edgar Pons	Kalex	27	+42.678	28	
21	2	(Switzerland) Jesko Raffin	Kalex	27	+43.275	20	
22	87	(Australia) Remy Gardner	Tech 3	27	+51.990	24	
23	10	(Italy) Luca Marini	Kalex	27	+54.931	26	
24	6	(United Kingdom) Tarran Mackenzie	Suter	27	+1:09.494	32	
25	89	(Malaysia) Khairul Idham Pawi	Kalex	27	+1:10.070	29	
26	45	(Japan) Tetsuta Nagashima	Kalex	27	+1:33.876	17	
Ret	97	(Spain) Xavi Vierge	Tech 3	16	Accident	9	
Ret	9	(Spain) Jorge Navarro	Kalex	11	Accident	23	
Ret	11	(Germany) Sandro Cortese	Suter	8	Accident	13	
Ret	19	(Belgium) Xavier Siméon	Kalex	7	Retired	30	
Ret	88	(Spain) Ricard Cardús	Kalex	6	Accident	14	
Ret	62	(Italy) Stefano Manzi	Kalex	2	Accident	27	
DNS	94	(United Kingdom) Jake Dixon	Suter		Did not start		
OFFICIAL MOTO2 REPORT

=== Moto3 ===
Pos.	No.	Rider	Manufacturer	Laps	Time/Retired	Grid	Points
1	88	(Spain) Jorge Martín	Honda	24	40:02.193	1	25
2	36	(Spain) Joan Mir	Honda	24	+3.760	2	20
3	42	(Spain) Marcos Ramírez	KTM	24	+3.877	8	16
4	5	(Italy) Romano Fenati	Honda	24	+3.953	13	13
5	33	(Italy) Enea Bastianini	Honda	24	+3.999	5	11
6	58	(Spain) Juan Francisco Guevara	KTM	24	+4.940	11	10
7 (Note: 1-place penalty for exceeding track limits.)	10	(Italy) Dennis Foggia	KTM	24	+4.735	15	9
8	17	(United Kingdom) John McPhee	Honda	24	+5.071	22	8
9	44	(Spain) Arón Canet	Honda	24	+5.218	6	7
10	39	(Japan) Kazuki Masaki	Honda	24	+6.462	18	6
11	24	(Japan) Tatsuki Suzuki	Honda	24	+6.544	4	5
12	64	(Netherlands) Bo Bendsneyder	KTM	24	+6.633	10	4
13	71	(Japan) Ayumu Sasaki	Honda	24	+8.687	7	3
14	23	(Italy) Niccolò Antonelli	KTM	24	+16.100	14	2
15	65	(Germany) Philipp Öttl	KTM	24	+16.156	16	1
16	16	(Italy) Andrea Migno	KTM	24	+16.263	24	
17	7	(Malaysia) Adam Norrodin	Honda	24	+16.398	12	
18	84	(Czech Republic) Jakub Kornfeil	Peugeot	24	+33.128	25	
19	95	(France) Jules Danilo	Honda	24	+33.807	21	
20	48	(Italy) Lorenzo Dalla Porta	Mahindra	24	+34.360	19	
21	41	(Thailand) Nakarin Atiratphuvapat	Honda	24	+34.629	31	
22	96	(Italy) Manuel Pagliani	Mahindra	24	+34.403	23	
23	75	(Spain) Albert Arenas	Mahindra	24	+34.958	17	
24	27	(Japan) Kaito Toba	Honda	24	+35.730	20	
25	14	(Italy) Tony Arbolino	Honda	24	+39.331	29	
26	6	(Spain) María Herrera	KTM	24	+46.209	30	
27	11	(Belgium) Livio Loi	Honda	24	+51.534	27	
28	12	(Italy) Marco Bezzecchi	Mahindra	24	+1:17.109	28	
29	4	(Finland) Patrik Pulkkinen	Peugeot	23	+1 lap	26	
Ret	21	(Italy) Fabio Di Giannantonio	Honda	7	Retired	9	
Ret	19	(Argentina) Gabriel Rodrigo	KTM	2	Accident	3	
DNS	40	(South Africa) Darryn Binder	KTM		Did not start		
DNS	8	(Italy) Nicolò Bulega	KTM		Did not start		
OFFICIAL MOTO3 REPORT

== Championship standings after the race ==
=== MotoGP ===
Below are the standings for the top five riders and constructors after round eighteen has concluded.

Riders' Championship standings

Pos.	Rider	Points
1	(Spain) Marc Márquez	298
2	(Italy) Andrea Dovizioso	261
3	(Spain) Maverick Viñales	230
4	(Spain) Dani Pedrosa	210
5	(Italy) Valentino Rossi	208

Constructors' Championship standings

Pos.	Constructor	Points
1	(Japan) Honda	357
2	(Japan) Yamaha	321
3	(Italy) Ducati	310
4	(Japan) Suzuki	100
5	(Austria) KTM	69

- Note: Only the top five positions are included for both sets of standings.

=== Moto2 ===
Pos.	Rider	Points
1	(Italy) Franco Morbidelli	308
2	(Switzerland) Thomas Lüthi	243
3	(Portugal) Miguel Oliveira	241
4	(Spain) Álex Márquez	201
5	(Italy) Francesco Bagnaia	174
6	(Italy) Mattia Pasini	148
7	(Japan) Takaaki Nakagami	137
8	(South Africa) Brad Binder	125
9	(Italy) Simone Corsi	117
10	(Malaysia) Hafizh Syahrin	106

=== Moto3 ===
Pos.	Rider	Points
1	(Spain) Joan Mir	341
2	(Italy) Romano Fenati	248
3	(Spain) Arón Canet	199
4	(Spain) Jorge Martín	196
5	(Italy) Fabio Di Giannantonio	153
6	(Italy) Enea Bastianini	141
7	(United Kingdom) John McPhee	131
8	(Spain) Marcos Ramírez	123
9	(Italy) Andrea Migno	118
10	(Germany) Philipp Öttl	105

== Notes ==
Previous race: 2017 Malaysian Grand Prix	FIM Grand Prix World Championship; 2017 season	Next race: 2018 Qatar Grand Prix
Previous race: 2016 Valencian Grand Prix	Valencian Community motorcycle Grand Prix	Next race: 2018 Valencian Grand Prix
