= 2020 Qatar motorcycle Grand Prix =

2020 Qatar Grand Prix
Race details
- Race 1 of 15 races in the 2020 Grand Prix motorcycle racing season
- Date: 8 March 2020
- Official name: QNB Grand Prix of Qatar
- Location: Losail International Circuit; Lusail, Qatar
- Course: Permanent racing facility; 5.380 km (3.343 mi)

Moto2
Pole position
Rider	(United States) Joe Roberts	Kalex
Time	1:58.136	
Fastest lap
Rider	(Japan) Tetsuta Nagashima	Kalex
Time	1:59.218 on lap 8	
Podium
First	(Japan) Tetsuta Nagashima	Kalex
Second	(Italy) Lorenzo Baldassarri	Kalex
Third	(Italy) Enea Bastianini	Kalex

Moto3
Pole position
Rider	(Japan) Tatsuki Suzuki	Honda
Time	2:04.815	
Fastest lap
Rider	(Japan) Ai Ogura	Honda
Time	2:05.788 on lap 14	
Podium
First	(Spain) Albert Arenas	KTM
Second	(United Kingdom) John McPhee	Honda
Third	(Japan) Ai Ogura	Honda

The 2020 Qatar motorcycle Grand Prix was the first round of the 2020 Grand Prix motorcycle racing season. It was held at the Losail International Circuit in Doha on 8 March 2020. The MotoGP race was cancelled after Qatari quarantine measures were put in place as a response to the outbreak of coronavirus disease (COVID-19). Because Moto2 and Moto3 teams were testing at Losail the previous week, teams were staying over in Qatar for that race and officials allowed them to participate in all scheduled events.

== Classification ==
=== Moto2 ===
Pos.	No.	Rider	Manufacturer	Laps	Time/Retired	Grid	Points
1	45	(Japan) Tetsuta Nagashima	Kalex	20	40:00.192	14	25
2	7	(Italy) Lorenzo Baldassarri	Kalex	20	+1.347	9	20
3	33	(Italy) Enea Bastianini	Kalex	20	+1.428	3	16
4	16	(United States) Joe Roberts	Kalex	20	+1.559	1	13
5	87	(Australia) Remy Gardner	Kalex	20	+1.901	6	11
6	9	(Spain) Jorge Navarro	Speed Up	20	+2.381	4	10
7	23	(Germany) Marcel Schrötter	Kalex	20	+4.490	13	9
8	44	(Spain) Arón Canet	Speed Up	20	+4.703	16	8
9	97	(Spain) Xavi Vierge	Kalex	20	+7.118	10	7
10	12	(Switzerland) Thomas Lüthi	Kalex	20	+8.904	18	6
11	64	(Netherlands) Bo Bendsneyder	NTS	20	+9.730	5	5
12	72	(Italy) Marco Bezzecchi	Kalex	20	+11.410	7	4
13	21	(Italy) Fabio Di Giannantonio	Speed Up	20	+12.701	11	3
14	96	(United Kingdom) Jake Dixon	Kalex	20	+12.717	20	2
15	62	(Italy) Stefano Manzi	MV Agusta	20	+16.208	21	1
16	57	(Spain) Edgar Pons	Kalex	20	+16.256	17	
17	40	(Spain) Héctor Garzó	Kalex	20	+16.869	23	
18	11	(Italy) Nicolò Bulega	Kalex	20	+16.932	15	
19	55	(Malaysia) Hafizh Syahrin	Speed Up	20	+19.639	25	
20	88	(Spain) Jorge Martín	Kalex	20	+20.662	8	
21	24	(Italy) Simone Corsi	MV Agusta	20	+27.291	28	
22	27	(Indonesia) Andi Farid Izdihar	Kalex	20	+34.514	26	
23	2	(Switzerland) Jesko Raffin	NTS	20	+34.664	22	
24	19	(Italy) Lorenzo Dalla Porta	Kalex	20	+45.850	27	
25	35	(Thailand) Somkiat Chantra	Kalex	19	+1 lap	19	
Ret	10	(Italy) Luca Marini	Kalex	19	Accident	2	
Ret	99	(Malaysia) Kasma Daniel	Kalex	8	Accident	29	
Ret	37	(Spain) Augusto Fernández	Kalex	2	Accident	12	
Ret	42	(Spain) Marcos Ramírez	Kalex	1	Accident Damage	24	
DNS	22	(United Kingdom) Sam Lowes	Kalex		Did not start		
OFFICIAL MOTO2 RACE REPORT

- Sam Lowes withdrew from the event after Friday practice due to a shoulder injury.

=== Moto3 ===
Pos.	No.	Rider	Manufacturer	Laps	Time/Retired	Grid	Points
1	75	(Spain) Albert Arenas	KTM	18	38:08.941	3	25
2	17	(United Kingdom) John McPhee	Honda	18	+0.053	9	20
3	79	(Japan) Ai Ogura	Honda	18	+0.344	5	16
4 (Note: 1-position penalty for exceeding track limits.)	5	(Spain) Jaume Masiá	Honda	18	+0.247	6	13
5	24	(Japan) Tatsuki Suzuki	Honda	18	+0.789	1	11
6	2	(Argentina) Gabriel Rodrigo	Honda	18	+0.426	13	10
7	52	(Spain) Jeremy Alcoba	Honda	18	+0.559	11	9
8	12	(Czech Republic) Filip Salač	Honda	18	+0.823	20	8
9	7	(Italy) Dennis Foggia	Honda	18	+0.964	19	7
10	25	(Spain) Raúl Fernández	KTM	18	+0.834	2	6
11	11	(Spain) Sergio García	Honda	18	+1.261	14	5
12	53	(Turkey) Deniz Öncü	KTM	18	+1.485	8	4
13	21	(Spain) Alonso López	Husqvarna	18	+1.602	25	3
14	27	(Japan) Kaito Toba	KTM	18	+2.790	12	2
15	14	(Italy) Tony Arbolino	Honda	18	+2.575	10	1
16	16	(Italy) Andrea Migno	KTM	18	+3.180	7	
17	55	(Italy) Romano Fenati	Husqvarna	18	+5.802	18	
18	92	(Japan) Yuki Kunii	Honda	18	+5.829	15	
19	71	(Japan) Ayumu Sasaki	KTM	18	+6.109	21	
20	6	(Japan) Ryusei Yamanaka	Honda	18	+8.457	27	
21	99	(Spain) Carlos Tatay	KTM	18	+8.480	17	
22	82	(Italy) Stefano Nepa	KTM	18	+16.240	22	
23	9	(Italy) Davide Pizzoli	KTM	18	+21.450	24	
24	54	(Italy) Riccardo Rossi	KTM	18	+26.209	23	
25	50	(Switzerland) Jason Dupasquier	KTM	18	+26.412	29	
26	89	(Malaysia) Khairul Idham Pawi	Honda	18	+28.189	31	
27	73	(Austria) Maximilian Kofler	KTM	18	+28.517	26	
28	13	(Italy) Celestino Vietti	KTM	18	+32.106	16	
29	60	(Germany) Dirk Geiger	KTM	18	+41.931	28	
Ret	40	(South Africa) Darryn Binder	KTM	17	Accident	4	
Ret	20	(Spain) José Julián García	Honda	13	Accident	30	
OFFICIAL MOTO3 RACE REPORT

== Championship standings after the race ==
Below are the standings for the top five riders, constructors, and teams after the round.

=== Moto2 ===
Riders' Championship standings

Pos.	Rider	Points
1	(Japan) Tetsuta Nagashima	25
2	(Italy) Lorenzo Baldassarri	20
3	(Italy) Enea Bastianini	16
4	(United States) Joe Roberts	13
5	(Australia) Remy Gardner	11

Constructors' Championship standings

Pos.	Constructor	Points
1	(Germany) Kalex	25
2	(Italy) Speed Up	10
3	(Japan) NTS	5
4	(Italy) MV Agusta	1

Teams' Championship standings

Pos.	Team	Points
1	(Finland) Red Bull KTM Ajo	25
2	(Spain) Flexbox HP40	20
3	(Italy) Italtrans Racing Team	16
4	(Germany) Liqui Moly Intact GP	15
5	(United States) American Racing	13

=== Moto3 ===
Riders' Championship standings

Pos.	Rider	Points
1	(Spain) Albert Arenas	25
2	(United Kingdom) John McPhee	20
3	(Japan) Ai Ogura	16
4	(Spain) Jaume Masiá	13
5	(Japan) Tatsuki Suzuki	11

Constructors' Championship standings

Pos.	Constructor	Points
1	(Austria) KTM	25
2	(Japan) Honda	20
3	(Sweden) Husqvarna	3

Teams' Championship standings

Pos.	Team	Points
1	(Spain) Gaviota Aspar Team Moto3	25
2	(Malaysia) Petronas Sprinta Racing	20
3	(Luxembourg) Leopard Racing	20
4	(Italy) Kömmerling Gresini Moto3	19
5	(Japan) Honda Team Asia	16

== Notes ==
Previous race: 2019 Valencian Grand Prix	FIM Grand Prix World Championship; 2020 season	Next race: 2020 Spanish Grand Prix; Multiple Grands Prix called off
Previous race: 2019 Qatar Grand Prix	Qatar motorcycle Grand Prix	Next race: 2021 Qatar Grand Prix
