= 2017 Qatar motorcycle Grand Prix =

2017 Qatar Grand Prix
Race details
- Race 1 of 18 races in the 2017 Grand Prix motorcycle racing season
- Date: 26 March 2017
- Official name: Grand Prix of Qatar
- Location: Losail International Circuit
- Course: Permanent racing facility; 5.380 km (3.343 mi)

MotoGP
Pole position
| Rider | (Spain) Maverick Viñales | Yamaha |
| Time | 1:54.316 | |
Fastest lap
| Rider | (France) Johann Zarco | Yamaha |
| Time | 1:55.990 on lap 4 | |
Podium
| First | (Spain) Maverick Viñales | Yamaha |
| Second | (Italy) Andrea Dovizioso | Ducati |
| Third | (Italy) Valentino Rossi | Yamaha |

Moto2
Pole position
| Rider | (Italy) Franco Morbidelli | Kalex |
| Time | 2:00.349 | |
Fastest lap
| Rider | (Italy) Franco Morbidelli | Kalex |
| Time | 2:00.087 on lap 6 | |
Podium
| First | (Italy) Franco Morbidelli | Kalex |
| Second | (Switzerland) Thomas Lüthi | Kalex |
| Third | (Japan) Takaaki Nakagami | Kalex |

Moto3
Pole position
| Rider | (Spain) Jorge Martín | Honda |
| Time | 2:06.817 | |
Fastest lap
| Rider | (Italy) Fabio Di Giannantonio | Honda |
| Time | 2:06.860 on lap 5 | |
Podium
| First | (Spain) Joan Mir | Honda |
| Second | (United Kingdom) John McPhee | Honda |
| Third | (Spain) Jorge Martín | Honda |

The 2017 Qatar motorcycle Grand Prix was the first round of the 2017 MotoGP season. It was held at the Losail International Circuit in Doha on 26 March 2017. For all the three classes, the starting grid was formed by each rider's best time from any of the three free practice sessions held, after rain cancelled the planned qualifying sessions.

In the MotoGP race, Maverick Viñales won on his first outing for Yamaha, becoming the first rider to do so on début for Yamaha since his teammate Valentino Rossi did the same back in 2004.

The Moto2 class saw the début of the KTM Moto2 chassis package, following KTM's expansion into Moto2 along with MotoGP with the RC16.

== Classification ==
=== MotoGP ===
| Pos. | No. | Rider | Team | Manufacturer | Laps | Time/Retired | Grid | Points |
|---|---|---|---|---|---|---|---|---|
| 1 | 25 | (Spain) Maverick Viñales | Movistar Yamaha MotoGP | Yamaha | 20 | 38:59.999 | 1 | 25 |
| 2 | 4 | (Italy) Andrea Dovizioso | Ducati Team | Ducati | 20 | +0.461 | 5 | 20 |
| 3 | 46 | (Italy) Valentino Rossi | Movistar Yamaha MotoGP | Yamaha | 20 | +1.928 | 10 | 16 |
| 4 | 93 | (Spain) Marc Márquez | Repsol Honda Team | Honda | 20 | +6.745 | 3 | 13 |
| 5 | 26 | (Spain) Dani Pedrosa | Repsol Honda Team | Honda | 20 | +7.128 | 7 | 11 |
| 6 | 41 | (Spain) Aleix Espargaró | Aprilia Racing Team Gresini | Aprilia | 20 | +7.661 | 15 | 10 |
| 7 | 45 | (United Kingdom) Scott Redding | Octo Pramac Racing | Ducati | 20 | +9.782 | 6 | 9 |
| 8 | 43 | (Australia) Jack Miller | EG 0,0 Marc VDS | Honda | 20 | +14.486 | 16 | 8 |
| 9 | 42 | (Spain) Álex Rins | Team Suzuki Ecstar | Suzuki | 20 | +14.788 | 18 | 7 |
| 10 | 94 | (Germany) Jonas Folger | Monster Yamaha Tech 3 | Yamaha | 20 | +15.069 | 8 | 6 |
| 11 | 99 | (Spain) Jorge Lorenzo | Ducati Team | Ducati | 20 | +20.516 | 12 | 5 |
| 12 | 76 | (France) Loris Baz | Reale Avintia Racing | Ducati | 20 | +21.255 | 14 | 4 |
| 13 | 8 | (Spain) Héctor Barberá | Reale Avintia Racing | Ducati | 20 | +28.828 | 20 | 3 |
| 14 | 17 | (Czech Republic) Karel Abraham | Pull&Bear Aspar Team | Ducati | 20 | +29.123 | 17 | 2 |
| 15 | 53 | (Spain) Tito Rabat | EG 0,0 Marc VDS | Honda | 20 | +29.470 | 19 | 1 |
| 16 | 44 | (Spain) Pol Espargaró | Red Bull KTM Factory Racing | KTM | 20 | +33.601 | 22 | |
| 17 | 38 | (United Kingdom) Bradley Smith | Red Bull KTM Factory Racing | KTM | 20 | +39.704 | 23 | |
| 18 | 22 | (United Kingdom) Sam Lowes | Aprilia Racing Team Gresini | Aprilia | 20 | +47.131 | 21 | |
| Ret | 9 | (Italy) Danilo Petrucci | Octo Pramac Racing | Ducati | 14 | Lost Power | 11 | |
| Ret | 29 | (Italy) Andrea Iannone | Team Suzuki Ecstar | Suzuki | 10 | Accident | 2 | |
| Ret | 19 | (Spain) Álvaro Bautista | Pull&Bear Aspar Team | Ducati | 7 | Accident | 13 | |
| Ret | 5 | (France) Johann Zarco | Monster Yamaha Tech 3 | Yamaha | 6 | Accident | 4 | |
| Ret | 35 | (United Kingdom) Cal Crutchlow | LCR Honda | Honda | 4 | Accident | 9 | |

=== Moto2 ===
| Pos. | No. | Rider | Manufacturer | Laps | Time/Retired | Grid | Points |
|---|---|---|---|---|---|---|---|
| 1 | 21 | (Italy) Franco Morbidelli | Kalex | 20 | 40:18.480 | 1 | 25 |
| 2 | 12 | (Switzerland) Thomas Lüthi | Kalex | 20 | +2.681 | 3 | 20 |
| 3 | 30 | (Japan) Takaaki Nakagami | Kalex | 20 | +3.304 | 4 | 16 |
| 4 | 44 | (Portugal) Miguel Oliveira | KTM | 20 | +3.584 | 5 | 13 |
| 5 | 73 | (Spain) Álex Márquez | Kalex | 20 | +11.226 | 2 | 11 |
| 6 | 10 | (Italy) Luca Marini | Kalex | 20 | +13.747 | 13 | 10 |
| 7 | 40 | (France) Fabio Quartararo | Kalex | 20 | +13.988 | 10 | 9 |
| 8 | 7 | (Italy) Lorenzo Baldassarri | Kalex | 20 | +17.465 | 15 | 8 |
| 9 | 97 | (Spain) Xavi Vierge | Tech 3 | 20 | +17.477 | 8 | 7 |
| 10 | 49 | (Spain) Axel Pons | Kalex | 20 | +17.767 | 12 | 6 |
| 11 | 77 | (Switzerland) Dominique Aegerter | Suter | 20 | +17.802 | 7 | 5 |
| 12 | 42 | (Italy) Francesco Bagnaia | Kalex | 20 | +18.090 | 9 | 4 |
| 13 | 52 | (United Kingdom) Danny Kent | Suter | 20 | +19.323 | 6 | 3 |
| 14 | 2 | (Switzerland) Jesko Raffin | Kalex | 20 | +22.798 | 16 | 2 |
| 15 | 19 | (Belgium) Xavier Siméon | Kalex | 20 | +24.009 | 18 | 1 |
| 16 | 23 | (Germany) Marcel Schrötter | Suter | 20 | +24.077 | 14 | |
| 17 | 24 | (Italy) Simone Corsi | Speed Up | 20 | +28.193 | 24 | |
| 18 | 68 | (Colombia) Yonny Hernández | Kalex | 20 | +31.828 | 28 | |
| 19 | 45 | (Japan) Tetsuta Nagashima | Kalex | 20 | +31.839 | 21 | |
| 20 | 41 | (South Africa) Brad Binder | KTM | 20 | +34.046 | 22 | |
| 21 | 32 | (Spain) Isaac Viñales | Kalex | 20 | +40.227 | 25 | |
| 22 | 11 | (Germany) Sandro Cortese | Suter | 20 | +40.279 | 20 | |
| 23 | 60 | (Spain) Julián Simón | Kalex | 20 | +40.446 | 26 | |
| 24 | 54 | (Italy) Mattia Pasini | Kalex | 20 | +42.501 | 11 | |
| 25 | 88 | (Spain) Ricard Cardús | Speed Up | 20 | +43.000 | 30 | |
| 26 | 57 | (Spain) Edgar Pons | Kalex | 20 | +47.072 | 29 | |
| 27 | 5 | (Italy) Andrea Locatelli | Kalex | 20 | +47.486 | 31 | |
| 28 | 89 | (Malaysia) Khairul Idham Pawi | Kalex | 20 | +51.206 | 27 | |
| 29 | 62 | (Italy) Stefano Manzi | Kalex | 20 | +1:02.080 | 32 | |
| Ret | 9 | (Spain) Jorge Navarro | Kalex | 8 | Accident | 17 | |
| Ret | 55 | (Malaysia) Hafizh Syahrin | Kalex | 8 | Accident Damage | 19 | |
| Ret | 8 | (Qatar) Saeed Al Sulaiti | Speed Up | 5 | Accident | 33 | |
| Ret | 87 | (Australia) Remy Gardner | Tech 3 | 0 | Accident | 23 | |
| DNS | 96 | (Qatar) Nasser Al Malki | Speed Up | | Did not start | | |
OFFICIAL MOTO2 REPORT

=== Moto3 ===
| Pos. | No. | Rider | Manufacturer | Laps | Time/Retired | Grid | Points |
|---|---|---|---|---|---|---|---|
| 1 | 36 | (Spain) Joan Mir | Honda | 18 | 38:27.364 | 6 | 25 |
| 2 | 17 | (United Kingdom) John McPhee | Honda | 18 | +0.135 | 12 | 20 |
| 3 | 88 | (Spain) Jorge Martín | Honda | 18 | +0.218 | 1 | 16 |
| 4 | 44 | (Spain) Arón Canet | Honda | 18 | +0.252 | 8 | 13 |
| 5 | 5 | (Italy) Romano Fenati | Honda | 18 | +0.453 | 3 | 11 |
| 6 | 16 | (Italy) Andrea Migno | KTM | 18 | +0.579 | 7 | 10 |
| 7 | 23 | (Italy) Niccolò Antonelli | KTM | 18 | +0.661 | 5 | 9 |
| 8 | 21 | (Italy) Fabio Di Giannantonio | Honda | 18 | +0.878 | 15 | 8 |
| 9 | 42 | (Spain) Marcos Ramírez | KTM | 18 | +1.693 | 10 | 7 |
| 10 | 7 | (Malaysia) Adam Norrodin | Honda | 18 | +7.904 | 11 | 6 |
| 11 | 71 | (Japan) Ayumu Sasaki | Honda | 18 | +12.221 | 14 | 5 |
| 12 | 11 | (Belgium) Livio Loi | Honda | 18 | +16.748 | 17 | 4 |
| 13 | 40 | (South Africa) Darryn Binder | KTM | 18 | +16.786 | 26 | 3 |
| 14 | 8 | (Italy) Nicolò Bulega | KTM | 18 | +16.821 | 13 | 2 |
| 15 | 24 | (Japan) Tatsuki Suzuki | Honda | 18 | +16.832 | 19 | 1 |
| 16 | 33 | (Italy) Enea Bastianini | Honda | 18 | +16.943 | 18 | |
| 17 | 95 | (France) Jules Danilo | Honda | 18 | +27.583 | 23 | |
| 18 | 41 | (Thailand) Nakarin Atiratphuvapat | Honda | 18 | +27.638 | 29 | |
| 19 | 27 | (Japan) Kaito Toba | Honda | 18 | +27.641 | 27 | |
| 20 | 84 | (Czech Republic) Jakub Kornfeil | Peugeot | 18 | +28.034 | 21 | |
| 21 | 6 | (Spain) María Herrera | KTM | 18 | +28.150 | 25 | |
| 22 | 96 | (Italy) Manuel Pagliani | Mahindra | 18 | +28.379 | 28 | |
| 23 | 48 | (Italy) Lorenzo Dalla Porta | Mahindra | 18 | +28.388 | 24 | |
| 24 | 14 | (Italy) Tony Arbolino | Honda | 18 | +29.520 | 16 | |
| 25 | 12 | (Italy) Marco Bezzecchi | Mahindra | 18 | +54.344 | 20 | |
| 26 | 64 | (Netherlands) Bo Bendsneyder | KTM | 18 | +1:09.769 | 4 | |
| Ret | 4 | (Finland) Patrik Pulkkinen | Peugeot | 14 | Accident | 30 | |
| Ret | 58 | (Spain) Juan Francisco Guevara | KTM | 12 | Accident | 9 | |
| Ret | 65 | (Germany) Philipp Öttl | KTM | 12 | Accident Damage | 2 | |
| Ret | 75 | (Spain) Albert Arenas | Mahindra | 4 | Accident | 22 | |
| DNS | 19 | (Argentina) Gabriel Rodrigo | KTM | | Did not start | | |
OFFICIAL MOTO3 REPORT

- Gabriel Rodrigo suffered a broken collarbone in a crash during the opening free practice and withdrew from the event.

== Championship standings after the race ==
=== MotoGP ===
Below are the standings for the top five riders and constructors after round one has concluded.

Riders' Championship standings

| Pos. | Rider | Points |
|---|---|---|
| 1 | (Spain) Maverick Viñales | 25 |
| 2 | (Italy) Andrea Dovizioso | 20 |
| 3 | (Italy) Valentino Rossi | 16 |
| 4 | (Spain) Marc Márquez | 13 |
| 5 | (Spain) Dani Pedrosa | 11 |

Constructors' Championship standings

| Pos. | Constructor | Points |
|---|---|---|
| 1 | (Japan) Yamaha | 25 |
| 2 | (Italy) Ducati | 20 |
| 3 | (Japan) Honda | 13 |
| 4 | (Italy) Aprilia | 10 |
| 5 | (Japan) Suzuki | 7 |

- Note: Only the top five positions are included for both sets of standings.

=== Moto2 ===
| Pos. | Rider | Points |
|---|---|---|
| 1 | (Italy) Franco Morbidelli | 25 |
| 2 | (Switzerland) Thomas Lüthi | 20 |
| 3 | (Japan) Takaaki Nakagami | 16 |
| 4 | (Portugal) Miguel Oliveira | 13 |
| 5 | (Spain) Álex Márquez | 11 |
| 6 | (Italy) Luca Marini | 10 |
| 7 | (France) Fabio Quartararo | 9 |
| 8 | (Italy) Lorenzo Baldassarri | 8 |
| 9 | (Spain) Xavi Vierge | 7 |
| 10 | (Spain) Axel Pons | 6 |

=== Moto3 ===
| Pos. | Rider | Points |
|---|---|---|
| 1 | (Spain) Joan Mir | 25 |
| 2 | (United Kingdom) John McPhee | 20 |
| 3 | (Spain) Jorge Martín | 16 |
| 4 | (Spain) Arón Canet | 13 |
| 5 | (Italy) Romano Fenati | 11 |
| 6 | (Italy) Andrea Migno | 10 |
| 7 | (Italy) Niccolò Antonelli | 9 |
| 8 | (Italy) Fabio Di Giannantonio | 8 |
| 9 | (Spain) Marcos Ramírez | 7 |
| 10 | (Malaysia) Adam Norrodin | 6 |

== Notes ==
| Previous race: 2016 Valencian Grand Prix | FIM Grand Prix World Championship; 2017 season | Next race: 2017 Argentine Grand Prix |
| Previous race: 2016 Qatar Grand Prix | Qatar motorcycle Grand Prix | Next race: 2018 Qatar Grand Prix |
