= 2019 Qatar motorcycle Grand Prix =

2019 Qatar Grand Prix
Race details
- Race 1 of 19 races in the 2019 Grand Prix motorcycle racing season
- Date: 10 March 2019
- Official name: VisitQatar Grand Prix
- Location: Losail International Circuit, Doha, Qatar
- Course: Permanent racing facility; 5.380 km (3.343 mi)

MotoGP
Pole position
Rider	(Spain) Maverick Viñales	Yamaha
Time	1:53.546	
Fastest lap
Rider	(France) Fabio Quartararo	Yamaha
Time	1:55.039 on lap 3	
Podium
First	(Italy) Andrea Dovizioso	Ducati
Second	(Spain) Marc Márquez	Honda
Third	(United Kingdom) Cal Crutchlow	Honda

Moto2
Pole position
Rider	(Germany) Marcel Schrötter	Kalex
Time	1:58.585	
Fastest lap
Rider	(Switzerland) Thomas Lüthi	Kalex
Time	1:58.711 on lap 10	
Podium
First	(Italy) Lorenzo Baldassarri	Kalex
Second	(Switzerland) Thomas Lüthi	Kalex
Third	(Germany) Marcel Schrötter	Kalex

Moto3
Pole position
Rider	(Spain) Arón Canet	KTM
Time	2:05.883	
Fastest lap
Rider	(Italy) Romano Fenati	Honda
Time	2:05.403 on lap 2	
Podium
First	(Japan) Kaito Toba	Honda
Second	(Italy) Lorenzo Dalla Porta	Honda
Third	(Spain) Arón Canet	KTM

The 2019 Qatar motorcycle Grand Prix was the first round of the 2019 MotoGP season. It was held at the Losail International Circuit in Doha on 10 March 2019.

== Summary ==
The race saw the introduction of a new engine package in the Moto2 class to replace the Honda CBR600RR inline-4 engine which was used since Moto2 replaced 250cc 2-strokes in 2010. The new engines in the intermediate class are 765cc (46.7 cu in) triple engines made by Triumph Motorcycles, and are based on the engine of the Triumph Street Triple RS 765.

The weekend also marked the début of a new penalty named the "Long Lap" penalty for riders exceeding track limits. This is a route which is marked at a safe place on every circuit (usually an asphalt or run-off area outside a corner). Any rider that receives the penalty is given 3 laps to ride through it.

MV Agusta also made a return to Grand Prix racing after an absence of 42 years, joining forces with the Forward Racing team.

The Moto2 and Moto3 classes also adopted the qualifying format used by MotoGP since 2013, in which the riders that finish in 15th place or below in the third free practice session go to qualifying 1, then the four fastest riders go through to join the remaining 14 in qualifying 2.

In the Moto3 race, Arón Canet took pole position, with the race win going to Honda Team Asia's Kaito Toba, who became the first Japanese rider to win in the Moto3 class. Romano Fenati also made his return to Grand Prix racing after he had his contract with Forward Racing in Moto2 terminated after the controversial incident with Stefano Manzi.

In the first Triumph-powered Moto2 race, Marcel Schrötter took the first pole position of his career, joined on the front row by Xavi Vierge and Lorenzo Baldassarri. Vierge led the race throughout the early stages, but then began to drop back to 10th place. Baldassarri took the win, ahead of Thomas Lüthi on his Moto2 return and Schrötter. Lüthi also set the fastest lap.

In the MotoGP race, Maverick Viñales took pole for the newly-rebranded Monster Energy Yamaha team in his first race with the number 12. Rookie Fabio Quartararo also impressed in qualifying, taking 5th place, riding for the new Petronas Yamaha satellite team, replacing Tech3 who switched bikes to KTM after 18 years with Yamaha. However, on the warm-up lap, Quartararo had an issue with his bike and had to start from the pitlane. At the start, Viñales made a bad start and dropped to 7th, behind Suzuki rookie Joan Mir. Despite his problems at the start, Quartararo set the fastest lap on the third lap. In the closing stages, Andrea Dovizioso and reigning champion Marc Márquez fought for the victory, with the Ducati rider taking the victory for the second consecutive season. Cal Crutchlow completed the podium on his return after missing the final two races of 2018 due to injury. Jorge Lorenzo finished 13th on his first outing for Repsol Honda after only qualifying in 15th.

== Classification ==
=== MotoGP ===
Pos.	No.	Rider	Team	Manufacturer	Laps	Time/Retired	Grid	Points
1	4	(Italy) Andrea Dovizioso	Mission Winnow Ducati	Ducati	22	42:36.902	2	25
2	93	(Spain) Marc Márquez	Repsol Honda Team	Honda	22	+0.023	3	20
3	35	(United Kingdom) Cal Crutchlow	LCR Honda Castrol	Honda	22	+0.320	6	16
4	42	(Spain) Álex Rins	Team Suzuki Ecstar	Suzuki	22	+0.457	10	13
5	46	(Italy) Valentino Rossi	Monster Energy Yamaha MotoGP	Yamaha	22	+0.600	14	11
6	9	(Italy) Danilo Petrucci	Mission Winnow Ducati	Ducati	22	+2.320	7	10
7	12	(Spain) Maverick Viñales	Monster Energy Yamaha MotoGP	Yamaha	22	+2.481	1	9
8	36	(Spain) Joan Mir	Team Suzuki Ecstar	Suzuki	22	+5.088	11	8
9	30	(Japan) Takaaki Nakagami	LCR Honda Idemitsu	Honda	22	+7.406	9	7
10	41	(Spain) Aleix Espargaró	Aprilia Racing Team Gresini	Aprilia	22	+9.636	12	6
11	21	(Italy) Franco Morbidelli	Petronas Yamaha SRT	Yamaha	22	+9.647	8	5
12	44	(Spain) Pol Espargaró	Red Bull KTM Factory Racing	KTM	22	+12.774	16	4
13	99	(Spain) Jorge Lorenzo	Repsol Honda Team	Honda	22	+14.307	15	3
14	29	(Italy) Andrea Iannone	Aprilia Racing Team Gresini	Aprilia	22	+14.349	19	2
15	5	(France) Johann Zarco	Red Bull KTM Factory Racing	KTM	22	+15.093	21	1
16	20	(France) Fabio Quartararo	Petronas Yamaha SRT	Yamaha	22	+15.905	5	
17	88	(Portugal) Miguel Oliveira	Red Bull KTM Tech3	KTM	22	+16.377	17	
18	17	(Czech Republic) Karel Abraham	Reale Avintia Racing	Ducati	22	+22.972	20	
19	53	(Spain) Tito Rabat	Reale Avintia Racing	Ducati	22	+23.039	18	
20	55	(Malaysia) Hafizh Syahrin	Red Bull KTM Tech3	KTM	22	+43.242	22	
Ret	38	(United Kingdom) Bradley Smith	Aprilia Factory Racing	Aprilia	20	Accident	23	
Ret	43	(Australia) Jack Miller	Alma Pramac Racing	Ducati	12	Loose Saddle	4	
Ret	63	(Italy) Francesco Bagnaia	Alma Pramac Racing	Ducati	9	Handling	13	

=== Moto2 ===
Pos.	No.	Rider	Manufacturer	Laps	Time/Retired	Grid	Points
1	7	(Italy) Lorenzo Baldassarri	Kalex	20	39:56.109	3	25
2	12	(Switzerland) Thomas Lüthi	Kalex	20	+0.026	7	20
3	23	(Germany) Marcel Schrötter	Kalex	20	+2.123	1	16
4	87	(Australia) Remy Gardner	Kalex	20	+2.125	5	13
5	40	(Spain) Augusto Fernández	Kalex	20	+2.305	10	11
6	22	(United Kingdom) Sam Lowes	Kalex	20	+3.334	6	10
7	73	(Spain) Álex Márquez	Kalex	20	+5.018	9	9
8	10	(Italy) Luca Marini	Kalex	20	+7.336	4	8
9	33	(Italy) Enea Bastianini	Kalex	20	+12.949	13	7
10	97	(Spain) Xavi Vierge	Kalex	20	+13.865	2	6
11	21	(Italy) Fabio Di Giannantonio	Speed Up	20	+15.525	19	5
12	41	(South Africa) Brad Binder	KTM	20	+16.591	8	4
13	5	(Italy) Andrea Locatelli	Kalex	20	+18.667	17	3
14	2	(Switzerland) Jesko Raffin	NTS	20	+18.916	20	2
15	88	(Spain) Jorge Martín	KTM	20	+22.771	11	1
16	64	(Netherlands) Bo Bendsneyder	NTS	20	+22.822	18	
17	89	(Malaysia) Khairul Idham Pawi	Kalex	20	+23.978	21	
18	77	(Switzerland) Dominique Aegerter	MV Agusta	20	+26.904	24	
19	24	(Italy) Simone Corsi	Kalex	20	+27.030	22	
20	62	(Italy) Stefano Manzi	MV Agusta	20	+40.274	26	
21	3	(Germany) Lukas Tulovic	KTM	20	+43.003	25	
22	16	(United States) Joe Roberts	KTM	20	+44.212	23	
23	65	(Germany) Philipp Öttl	KTM	20	+47.657	29	
24	20	(Indonesia) Dimas Ekky Pratama	Kalex	20	+57.596	31	
25	18	(Andorra) Xavi Cardelús	KTM	20	+1:18.749	32	
26	72	(Italy) Marco Bezzecchi	KTM	20	+1:35.817	28	
Ret	45	(Japan) Tetsuta Nagashima	Kalex	2	Accident	14	
Ret	96	(United Kingdom) Jake Dixon	KTM	2	Accident	30	
Ret	35	(Thailand) Somkiat Chantra	Kalex	1	Clutch	27	
Ret	9	(Spain) Jorge Navarro	Speed Up	0	Accident	12	
Ret	11	(Italy) Nicolò Bulega	Kalex	0	Accident	15	
Ret	27	(Spain) Iker Lecuona	KTM	0	Accident	16	
OFFICIAL MOTO2 REPORT

=== Moto3 ===
Pos.	No.	Rider	Manufacturer	Laps	Time/Retired	Grid	Points
1	27	(Japan) Kaito Toba	Honda	18	38:08.887	3	25
2	48	(Italy) Lorenzo Dalla Porta	Honda	18	+0.053	2	20
3	44	(Spain) Arón Canet	KTM	18	+0.174	1	16
4	42	(Spain) Marcos Ramírez	Honda	18	+0.505	20	13
5	13	(Italy) Celestino Vietti	KTM	18	+0.584	8	11
6	75	(Spain) Albert Arenas	KTM	18	+0.818	6	10
7	25	(Spain) Raúl Fernández	KTM	18	+0.846	10	9
8	23	(Italy) Niccolò Antonelli	Honda	18	+0.850	5	8
9	55	(Italy) Romano Fenati	Honda	18	+0.890	11	7
10	84	(Czech Republic) Jakub Kornfeil	KTM	18	+0.903	14	6
11	79	(Japan) Ai Ogura	Honda	18	+0.956	15	5
12	21	(Spain) Alonso López	Honda	18	+1.755	21	4
13	17	(United Kingdom) John McPhee	Honda	18	+1.849	4	3
14	16	(Italy) Andrea Migno	KTM	18	+3.450	17	2
15	19	(Argentina) Gabriel Rodrigo	Honda	18	+3.514	12	1
16	14	(Italy) Tony Arbolino	Honda	18	+4.201	7	
17	77	(Spain) Vicente Pérez	KTM	18	+4.267	9	
18	61	(Turkey) Can Öncü	KTM	18	+26.272	18	
19	22	(Japan) Kazuki Masaki	KTM	18	+31.779	13	
20	6	(Japan) Ryusei Yamanaka	Honda	18	+31.820	25	
21	12	(Czech Republic) Filip Salač	KTM	18	+31.943	28	
22	54	(Italy) Riccardo Rossi	Honda	18	+31.979	29	
23	76	(Kazakhstan) Makar Yurchenko	KTM	18	+1:23.259	23	
24	69	(United Kingdom) Tom Booth-Amos	KTM	15	+3 laps	26	
Ret	24	(Japan) Tatsuki Suzuki	Honda	4	Accident	19	
Ret	7	(Italy) Dennis Foggia	KTM	4	Accident	16	
Ret	40	(South Africa) Darryn Binder	KTM	1	Accident	24	
Ret	71	(Japan) Ayumu Sasaki	Honda	0	Accident	22	
Ret	5	(Spain) Jaume Masiá	KTM	0	Accident	27	
OFFICIAL MOTO3 REPORT

== Championship standings after the race ==
=== MotoGP ===
Pos.	Rider	Points
1	(Italy) Andrea Dovizioso	25
2	(Spain) Marc Márquez	20
3	(United Kingdom) Cal Crutchlow	16
4	(Spain) Álex Rins	13
5	(Italy) Valentino Rossi	11
6	(Italy) Danilo Petrucci	10
7	(Spain) Maverick Viñales	9
8	(Spain) Joan Mir	8
9	(Japan) Takaaki Nakagami	7
10	(Spain) Aleix Espargaró	6

=== Moto2 ===
Pos.	Rider	Points
1	(Italy) Lorenzo Baldassarri	25
2	(Switzerland) Thomas Lüthi	20
3	(Germany) Marcel Schrötter	16
4	(Australia) Remy Gardner	13
5	(Spain) Augusto Fernández	11
6	(United Kingdom) Sam Lowes	10
7	(Spain) Álex Márquez	9
8	(Italy) Luca Marini	8
9	(Italy) Enea Bastianini	7
10	(Spain) Xavi Vierge	6

=== Moto3 ===
Pos.	Rider	Points
1	(Japan) Kaito Toba	25
2	(Italy) Lorenzo Dalla Porta	20
3	(Spain) Arón Canet	16
4	(Spain) Marcos Ramírez	13
5	(Italy) Celestino Vietti	11
6	(Spain) Albert Arenas	10
7	(Spain) Raúl Fernández	9
8	(Italy) Niccolò Antonelli	8
9	(Italy) Romano Fenati	7
10	(Czech Republic) Jakub Kornfeil	6

Previous race: 2018 Valencian Grand Prix	FIM Grand Prix World Championship; 2019 season	Next race: 2019 Argentine Grand Prix
Previous race: 2018 Qatar Grand Prix	Qatar motorcycle Grand Prix	Next race: 2020 Qatar Grand Prix
