= KTM RC16 =

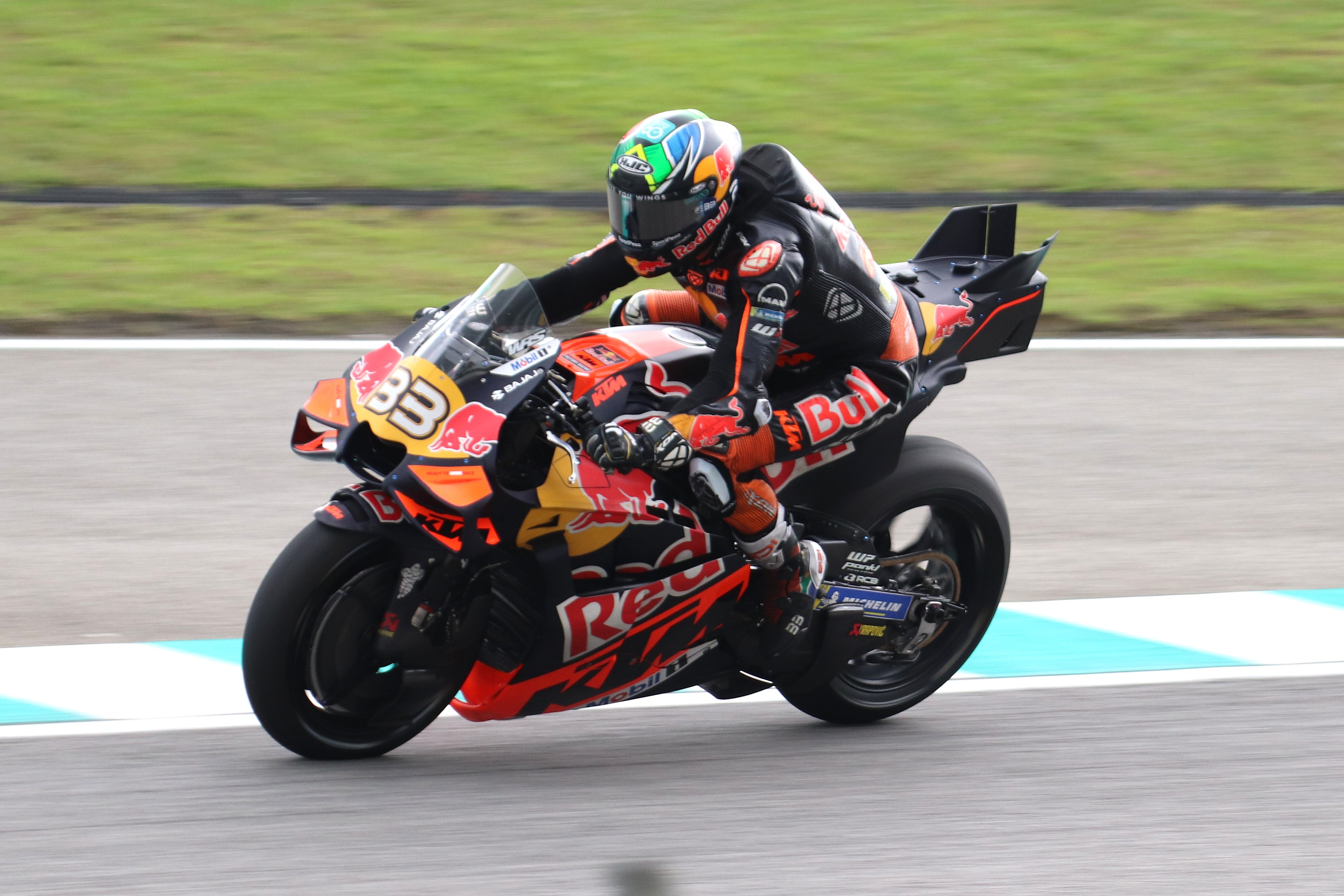
- Brad Binder riding KTM RC16 at Sepang 2025
- Manufacturer: KTM
- Production: since 2016
- Class: MotoGP Prototype
- Engine: 1,000 cc (61 cu in) four-stroke, 86° V4
- Transmission: 6-speed sequential manual
- Wheelbase: 1400 mm
- Weight: 160 kg (FIM regulation) (dry)
- Fuel capacity: 22 litres (FIM regulation)

The KTM RC16 is a prototype grand prix racing motorcycle which was developed to race in the MotoGP series by KTM, starting from the 2017 season.

== History ==
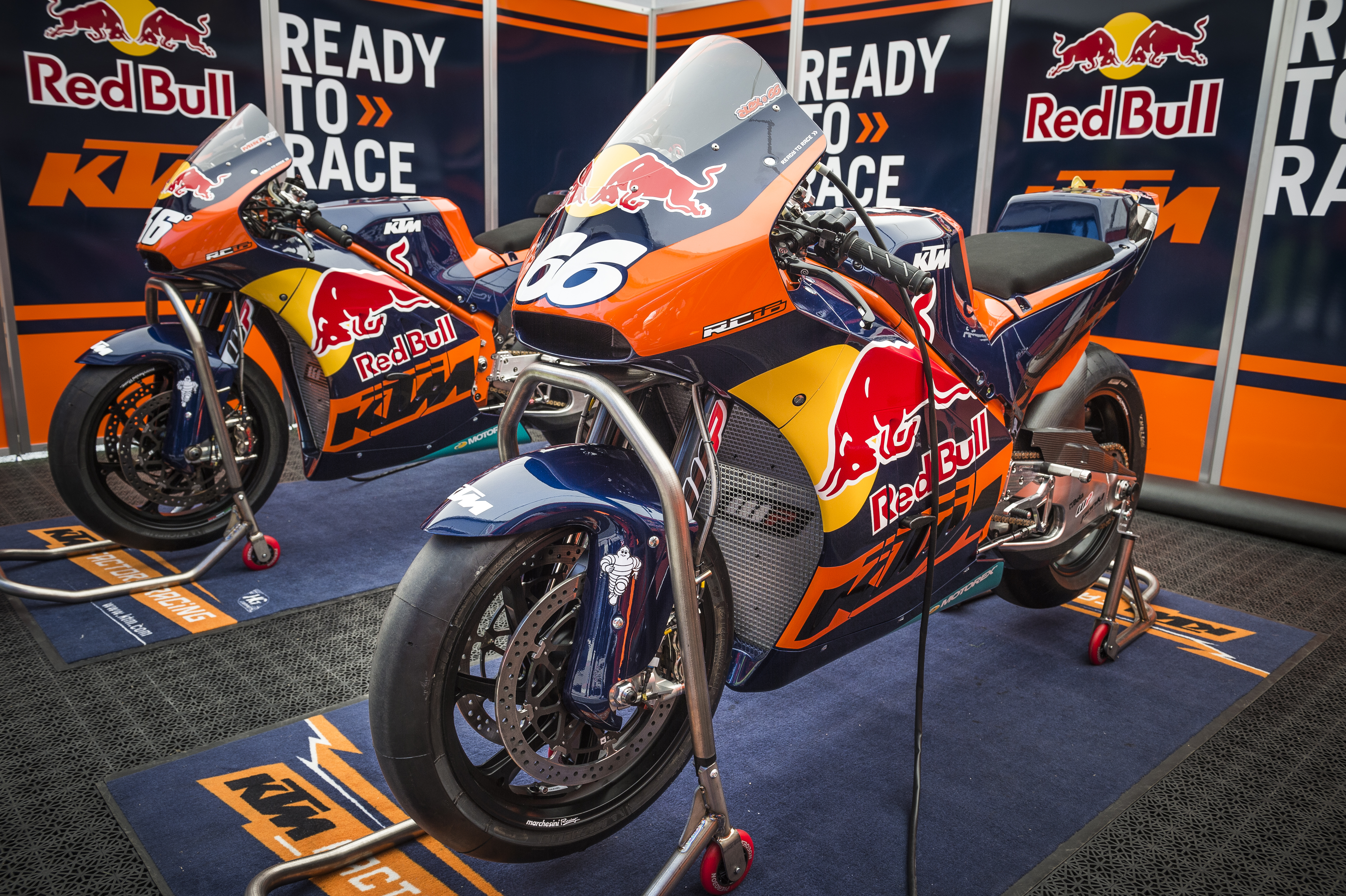
2016 KTM RC16

The RC16 made its debut as a wildcard entry at the 2016 Valencian Community motorcycle Grand Prix with test rider Mika Kallio. For KTM's return to MotoGP in 2017, their new factory team signed 2009 125cc runner-up, Bradley Smith and the 2013 Moto2 Champion, Pol Espargaró from Monster Yamaha Tech 3. Their team principals are Pit Beirer and Aki Ajo who is also Red Bull KTM Ajo's team principal.

On November 18, 2018, the RC16 achieved its first ever podium finish, having finished in 3rd place in the 2018 Valencian Community motorcycle Grand Prix with Pol Espargaró, after starting the race from 6th on the grid. Starting from 2019, the French private team Tech3 became KTM's first satellite team.

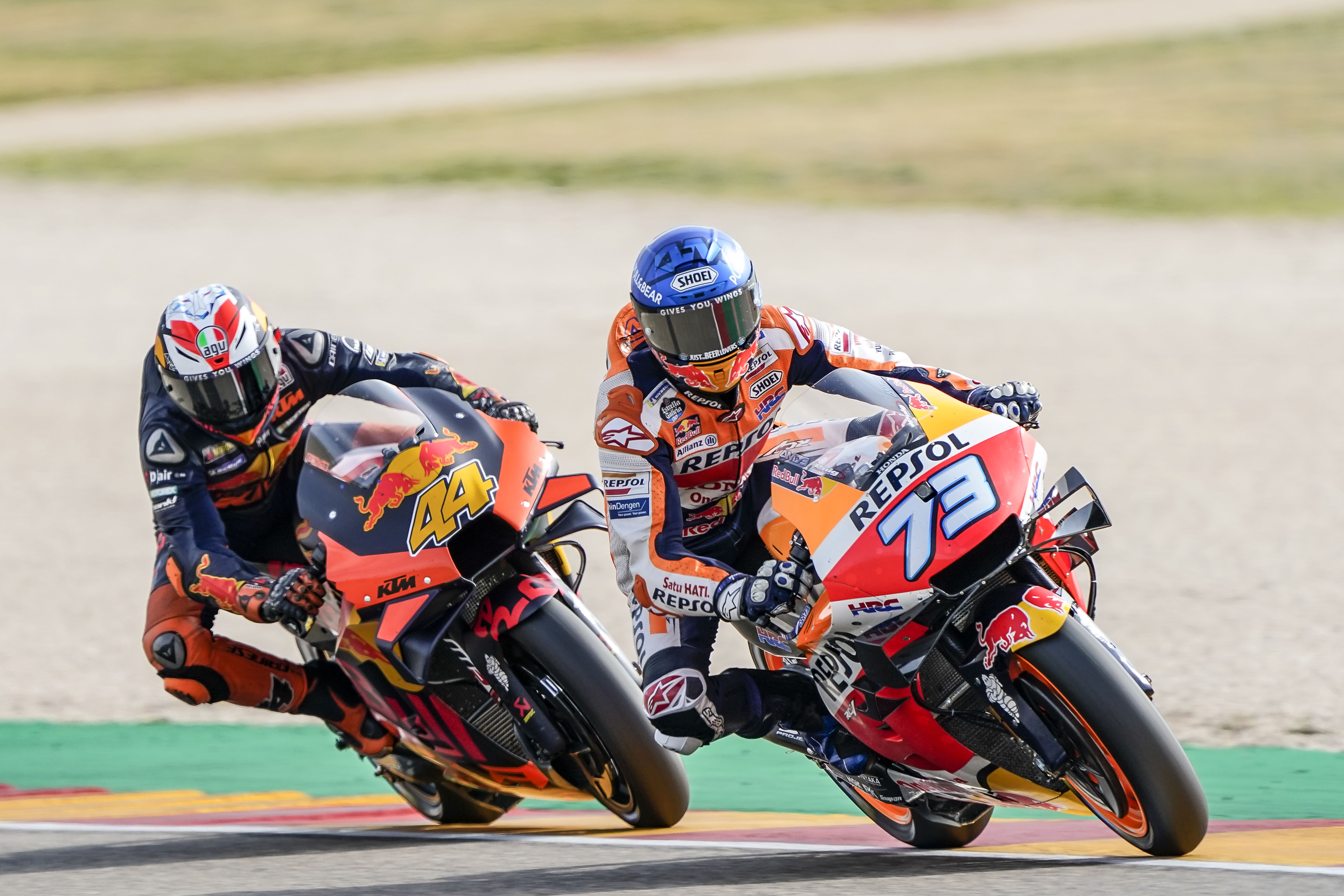
2020 KTM RC16 (left)

For the 2020 season, KTM completely redesigned the RC16 chassis based on feedback from development rider Dani Pedrosa. The upgraded RC16 features a hybrid chassis design (combining elements of twin spar and trellis frame designs) manufactured from steel, and a carbon fibre swingarm. In 2020 Brad Binder achieved KTM's first win as a constructor in the premier MotoGP class at the Czech Grand Prix. Miguel Oliveira took KTM's second race win, and first for satellite team Tech3, just two rounds later at the Styrian Grand Prix. Oliviera repeated the feat for KTM's third victory with a win at the season-closing Portuguese Grand Prix. With a further five third-place podiums from Pol Espargaró, the KTM factory team finished third in the teams' championship and KTM finished fourth in the constructor's championship, ahead of Honda and Aprilia.

== Designation ==
The motorcycle's name derives from KTM's long-standing usage of the "RC" designation (short for "Road/Competition") for its sportbikes, beginning with the RC8, RC 390, and RC 125 production models and also applied since 2012 to the RC250GP Moto3 machine. The "16" designation is related to the number of valves in the engine (4 valves per cylinder x 4 cylinders), keeping with KTM tradition as used in similars designations such as the former V-twin 1190 RC8 model and the various LC4 single-cylinder models.

== Specifications ==
Dimensions and weights
Wheelbase	1400 mm
Height	1000 mm
Dry weight	160 kg
Tank capacity	22 L
Mechanics
Engine type	four-stroke V4
Displacement (bore, stroke)	1000 cm^{3} (Ø81mm, 48.5mm - suspected based on MotoGP bore limits)
Cooling system	liquid
Valvetrain	DOHC, 4 valves per cylinder, pneumatic springs, gear drive
Fuel induction	digital electronic indirect multi-point port injection
Ignition	variable advance CDI
ECU	Magneti Marelli (series spec ECU)
Power	>265 bhp (198 kW) @ 18,500 rpm
Maximum engine speed	18,500 rpm
Transmission	6-speed seamless-shift sequential manual, final chain-drive
Starter	push start
Exhaust system	Akrapovič titanium twin 2-into-1 system (one per cylinder bank)
Electronic strategies	drive by wire, engine braking, traction control, wheelie control, quick shift+
Lubrication	Dry sump. Factory supplied by Motorex (2016–2022, 2026–present) later Mobil 1 (2023–2025) and Tech3 supplied by Elf (2019–2023) later Motul (2024–present)
Chassis
Frame	Steel hybrid construction, adjustable rake angle and swingarm pivot (2016-2019: tubular steel trellis)
Swingarm	Pivoted, carbon fibre construction (2016-2019: aluminium construction)
Bodywork	Carbon fibre (Wethje Carbon Composites)
Fork	WP Suspension USD
Rear suspension	WP Suspension monoshock
Brakes, front	2x 320/340mm carbon or steel discs, Brembo four-piston radial calipers
Brakes, rear	steel disc, Brembo twin-piston radial caliper
Wheel, front	Marchesini 17"/4.00" forged magnesium rim, Michelin tire
Wheel, rear	Marchesini 17"/6.25" forged magnesium rim, Michelin tire

== Complete MotoGP results ==
=== Motorcycle summary ===
These results are accurate up to the 2026 Italian motorcycle Grand Prix.

- Races won: 7

2020: Miguel Oliveira 2, Brad Binder 1 (3 in total)
2021: Brad Binder 1, Miguel Oliveira 1 (2 in total)
2022: Miguel Oliveira 2 (2 in total)

- Podiums: 38

2018: Pol Espargaró 1 (1 in total)
2020: Pol Espargaró 5, Miguel Oliveira 2, Brad Binder 1 (8 in total)
2021: Miguel Oliveira 3, Brad Binder 1 (4 in total)
2022: Miguel Oliveira 2, Brad Binder 3 (5 in total)
2023: Brad Binder 5, Jack Miller 1 (6 in total)
2024: Brad Binder 1, Pedro Acosta 5 (6 in total)
2025: Enea Bastianini 1, Pedro Acosta 5 (6 in total)
2026: Pedro Acosta 2 (2 in total)

- Poles: 5

2020: Pol Espargaró 2, Miguel Oliveira 1 (3 in total)
2024: Pedro Acosta 1 (1 in total)
2026: Pedro Acosta 1 (1 in total)

(Key)

Year	Team	Tyres	Riders		Races																						Riders' standings		Teams' standings		Manufacturers' standings	
Year	Team	Tyres	No.	Name	1	2	3	4	5	6	7	8	9	10	11	12	13	14	15	16	17	18	19	20	21	22	Pts	Pos	Pts	Pos	Pts	Pos
2016					QAT	ARG	AME	ESP	FRA	ITA	CAT	NED	GER	AUT	CZE	GBR	RSM	ARA	JPN	AUS	MAL	VAL										
2016	(Austria) Red Bull KTM Factory Racing	M	36	(Finland) Mika Kallio																		Ret					0	NC	0	NC	0	NC
2017					QAT	ARG	AME	SPA	FRA	ITA	CAT	NED	GER	CZE	AUT	GBR	RSM	ARA	JPN	AUS	MAL	VAL										
2017	(Austria) Red Bull KTM Factory Racing	M	36	(Finland) Mika Kallio									16		10			11				Ret					11	24th	—N/a		69	5th
2017	(Austria) Red Bull KTM Factory Racing	M	38	(United Kingdom) Bradley Smith	17	15	16	14	13	20	DNS	Ret	14	Ret	18	17	10	19	17	10	12	11					29	21st	84	10th	69	5th
2017	(Austria) Red Bull KTM Factory Racing	M	44	(Spain) Pol Espargaró	16	14	Ret	Ret	12	Ret	18	11	13	9	Ret	11	11	10	11	9	10	Ret					55	17th	84	10th	69	5th
2018					QAT	ARG	AME	SPA	FRA	ITA	CAT	NED	GER	CZE	AUT	GBR	RSM	ARA	THA	JPN	AUS	MAL	VAL									
2018	(Austria) Red Bull KTM Factory Racing	M	36	(Finland) Mika Kallio				10			Ret		DNS														6	25th	—N/a		72	5th
2018	(Austria) Red Bull KTM Factory Racing	M	38	(United Kingdom) Bradley Smith	18	Ret	16	13	14	14	Ret	17	10	Ret	14	C	16	13	15	12	10	15	8				38	18th	89	9th	72	5th
2018	(Austria) Red Bull KTM Factory Racing	M	44	(Spain) Pol Espargaró	Ret	11	13	11	11	11	11	12	Ret	DNS			Ret	DNS	21	12	Ret	Ret	3				51	14th	89	9th	72	5th
2018	(Austria) Red Bull KTM Factory Racing	M	76	(France) Loris Baz												C											0	NC	89	9th	72	5th
2019					QAT	ARG	AME	SPA	FRA	ITA	CAT	NED	GER	CZE	AUT	GBR	RSM	ARA	THA	JPN	AUS	MAL	VAL									
2019	(Austria) Red Bull KTM Factory Racing	M	5	(France) Johann Zarco	15	15	13	14	13	17	10	Ret	Ret	14	12	Ret	11										27 (30)	18th	134	8th	111	5th
2019	(Austria) Red Bull KTM Factory Racing	M	44	(Spain) Pol Espargaró	12	10	8	13	6	9	7	11	12	11	Ret	9	7	DNS	13	11	12	11	10				100	11th	134	8th	111	5th
2019	(Austria) Red Bull KTM Factory Racing	M	82	(Finland) Mika Kallio														17	Ret	14	Ret	15	12				7	26th	134	8th	111	5th
2019	(France) Red Bull KTM Tech3	M	27	(Spain) Iker Lecuona																			Ret				0	NC	42	10th	111	5th
2019	(France) Red Bull KTM Tech3	M	55	(Malaysia) Hafizh Syahrin	20	16	18	19	14	Ret	Ret	15	16	Ret	Ret	13	15	21	20	19	15	16	15				9	23rd	42	10th	111	5th
2019	(France) Red Bull KTM Tech3	M	88	(Portugal) Miguel Oliveira	17	11	14	18	15	16	12	13	18	13	8	Ret	16	13	16	12	DNS	DNS					33	17th	42	10th	111	5th
2020					SPA	ANC	CZE	AUT	STY	RSM	EMI	CAT	FRA	ARA	TER	EUR	VAL	POR														
2020	(Austria) Red Bull KTM Factory Racing	M	33	(South Africa) Brad Binder	13	Ret	1	4	8	12	Ret	11	12	11	Ret	7	5	Ret									87	11th	222	3rd	200	4th
2020	(Austria) Red Bull KTM Factory Racing	M	44	(Spain) Pol Espargaró	6	7	Ret	Ret	3	10	3	Ret	3	12	4	3	3	4									135	5th	222	3rd	200	4th
2020	(France) Red Bull KTM Tech3	M	27	(Spain) Iker Lecuona	Ret	Ret	Ret	9	10	14	Ret	14	15	14	9		WD										27	20th	152	7th	200	4th
2020	(France) Red Bull KTM Tech3	M	88	(Portugal) Miguel Oliveira	8	Ret	6	Ret	1	11	5	Ret	6	16	6	5	6	1									125	9th	152	7th	200	4th
2021					QAT	DOH	POR	SPA	FRA	ITA	CAT	GER	NED	STY	AUT	GBR	ARA	RSM	AME	EMI	ALR	VAL										
2021	(Austria) Red Bull KTM Factory Racing	M	26	(Spain) Dani Pedrosa										10													6	25th	—N/a		205	5th
2021	(Austria) Red Bull KTM Factory Racing	M	33	(South Africa) Brad Binder	14	8	5	Ret	13	5	8	4	12	4	1	6	7	9	9	11	10	7					151	6th	245	6th	205	5th
2021	(Austria) Red Bull KTM Factory Racing	M	88	(Portugal) Miguel Oliveira	13	15	16	11	Ret	2	1	2	5	Ret	Ret	16	14	20	11	Ret	Ret	14					94	14th	245	6th	205	5th
2021	(France) Tech3 KTM Factory Racing	M	9	(Italy) Danilo Petrucci	Ret	19	13	14	5	9	Ret	Ret	13	18	12	10	15	16	18	Ret	Ret	18					37	21st	76	11th	205	5th
2021	(France) Tech3 KTM Factory Racing	M	27	(Spain) Iker Lecuona	17	Ret	15	17	9	11	Ret	17	Ret	15	6	7	11	Ret	16	Ret	Ret	15					39	20th	76	11th	205	5th
2022					QAT	INA	ARG	AME	POR	SPA	FRA	ITA	CAT	GER	NED	GBR	AUT	RSM	ARA	JPN	THA	AUS	MAL	VAL								
2022	(Austria) Red Bull KTM Factory Racing	M	33	(South Africa) Brad Binder	2	8	6	13	Ret	10	8	7	8	7	5	11	7	8	4	2	10	10	8	2			188	6th	337	2nd	240	4th
2022	(Austria) Red Bull KTM Factory Racing	M	88	(Portugal) Miguel Oliveira	Ret	1	13	18	5	12	Ret	9	9	9	9	6	12	11	11	5	1	12	13	5			149	10th	337	2nd	240	4th
2022	(France) Tech3 KTM Factory Racing	M	25	(Spain) Raúl Fernández	18	17	16	19	DNS	WD	Ret	21	15	12	Ret	21	18	13	20	18	15	16	15	12			22nd	14	27	12th	240	4th
2022	(France) Tech3 KTM Factory Racing	M	87	(Australia) Remy Gardner	15	21	17	20	14	20	Ret	19	11	15	19	18	20	19	16	19	Ret	15	18	13			23rd	13	27	12th	240	4th
2023					POR	ARG	AME	SPA	FRA	ITA	GER	NED	GBR	AUT	CAT	RSM	IND	JPN	INA	AUS	THA	MAL	QAT	VAL								
2023	(Austria) Red Bull KTM Factory Racing	M	26	(Spain) Dani Pedrosa				7^{6}								4^{6}											32	19th	—N/a		373	2nd
2023	(Austria) Red Bull KTM Factory Racing	M	33	(South Africa) Brad Binder	6	17^{1}	13^{5}	2^{1}	6^{2}	5	Ret^{6}	4^{5}	3^{9}	2^{2}	Ret^{4}	14^{5}	4^{4}	Ret^{2}	6	4	3^{2}	Ret^{5}	5^{7}	3^{2}			293	4th	456	4th	373	2nd
2023	(Austria) Red Bull KTM Factory Racing	M	43	(Australia) Jack Miller	7^{4}	6	Ret^{9}	3^{3}	Ret	7^{6}	6^{3}	Ret	8^{7}	15^{5}	8	Ret	14^{7}	6^{4}	7^{9}	7	16	8^{6}	9	Ret			163	11th	456	4th	373	2nd
2023	(France) GasGas Factory Racing Tech3	M	37	(Spain) Augusto Fernández	13	11	10	13	4	15	11	10	11^{8}	14	9	16	Ret	7	Ret	Ret	17	14	15^{9}	Ret			71	17th	95	11th	373	2nd
2023	(France) GasGas Factory Racing Tech3	M	44	(Spain) Pol Espargaró	DNS								12	16^{6}	Ret	Ret	13	15	Ret	18	18	15	18	14			15	23rd	95	11th	373	2nd
2023	(France) GasGas Factory Racing Tech3	M	94	(Germany) Jonas Folger			12	17	13	19	17	14															9	25th	95	11th	373	2nd
2024					QAT	POR	AME	SPA	FRA	CAT	ITA	NED	GER	GBR	AUT	ARA	RSM	EMI	INA	JPN	AUS	THA	MAL	SLD								
2024	(Austria) Red Bull KTM Factory Racing	M	26	(Spain) Dani Pedrosa				Ret^{3}																			7	24th	304	6th	327	2nd
2024	(Austria) Red Bull KTM Factory Racing	M	33	(South Africa) Brad Binder	2 ^{2}	4	9	6	8	8	10^{6}	6^{6}	9^{8}	Ret^{4}	5^{7}	4^{6}	4^{7}	19 ^{6}	8	6	7	6^{9}	DNS^{7}	6^{9}			217	5th	304	6th	327	2nd
2024	(Austria) Red Bull KTM Factory Racing	M	43	(Australia) Jack Miller	21	5^{5}	13^{7}	Ret	Ret^{8}	Ret^{7}	16	11	13	12^{7}	19^{5}	15	8^{8}	16	Ret	10^{8}	11	5	DNS^{8}	13			87	14th	304	6th	327	2nd
2024	(Austria) Red Bull KTM Factory Racing	M	44	(Spain) Pol Espargaró							17				11^{9}		10										12	23rd	304	6th	327	2nd
2024	(France) GasGas Factory Racing Tech3	M	31	(Spain) Pedro Acosta	9^{8 F}	3 ^{7}	2^{7}	10^{2}	Ret^{6}	13^{3 F}	5^{3}	Ret	7	9^{5}	13	3^{3}	17^{6}	Ret^{5}	2^{6}	Ret^{P}	DNS	3	5^{9}	10			215	6th	242	7th	327	2nd
2024	(France) GasGas Factory Racing Tech3	M	37	(Spain) Augusto Fernández	17	11	14	Ret^{7}	13	Ret	Ret	14	16	16	15	12	Ret	18	Ret	Ret	17^{9}	Ret	10	19			27	20th	242	7th	327	2nd
2025					THA	ARG	AME	QAT	SPA	FRA	GBR	ARA	ITA	NED	GER	CZE	AUT	HUN	CAT	RSM	JPN	INA	AUS	MAL	POR	VAL						
2025	(Austria) Red Bull KTM Factory Racing	M	33	(South Africa) Brad Binder	8^{8}	7	Ret	13	6	Ret	14	Ret^{9}	9	11	7^{6}	8	7^{5}	7	Ret^{6}	10	12	4	8	9	5^{9}	8^{8}	155	11th	462	4th	372	3rd
2025	(Austria) Red Bull KTM Factory Racing	M	37	(Spain) Pedro Acosta	19^{6}	8^{9}	Ret^{7}	8	7	4	6^{8}	4^{5}	8	4^{9}	Ret^{9}	3^{2}	4^{3}	2	4^{4}	Ret^{9}	17^{3}	2	5^{3}	2^{3}	3^{2 F}	4^{2}	307	4th	462	4th	372	3rd
2025	(France) Red Bull KTM Tech3	M	12	(Spain) Maverick Viñales	16	12	14	14	4^{7}	5^{5}	11	18^{7}	Ret^{4}	5^{6}	DNS		DNS		13	Ret	16	DNS				Ret	72	18th	213	9th	372	3rd
2025	(France) Red Bull KTM Tech3	M	44	(Spain) Pol Espargaró												9^{9}		8					10^{9}	Ret	10		29	22nd	213	9th	372	3rd
2025	(France) Red Bull KTM Tech3	M	23	(Italy) Enea Bastianini	9	17	7	11	9	13	17	12	Ret	9	WD	Ret^{3}	5^{7}	Ret	3^{5}	Ret	11	Ret	9	7^{9}	18	10	112	14th			372	3rd
2026					THA	BRA	USA	SPA	FRA	CAT	ITA	HUN	CZE	NED	GER	GBR	ARA	RSM	AUT	JPN	INA	AUS	MAL	QAT	POR	VAL						
2026	(Austria) Red Bull KTM Factory Racing	M	33	(South Africa) Brad Binder	7^{6}	Ret	12	11^{4}	Ret	7	11	10	12^{9}	11	10	8	10	11	6^{9}	11	11	C^{6}	9^{7}	Ret			118*	12th*	427*	4th*	363*	3rd*
2026	(Austria) Red Bull KTM Factory Racing	M	37	(Spain) Pedro Acosta	2^{1}	7^{9}	3^{8}	10	5^{4}	Ret^{P 2}	6^{9}	2^{2}	Ret	Ret^{9}	4^{8}	5^{6}	2^{4}	3^{6}	1^{F}	7	5^{6}	C^{5}	2 ^{1}	6^{6}			309*	4th*	427*	4th*	363*	3rd*
2026	(France) Red Bull KTM Tech3	M	12	(Spain) Maverick Viñales	16	18	DNS			11	17	15	15	13	Ret					14	17	C	14	13			17*	23rd*	169*	7th*	363*	3rd*
2026	(France) Red Bull KTM Tech3	M	94	(Germany) Jonas Folger					16																		0*	30th*	169*	7th*	363*	3rd*
2026	(France) Red Bull KTM Tech3	M	44	(Spain) Pol Espargaró												13	16	14	16								5*	25th*	169*	7th*	363*	3rd*
2026	(France) Red Bull KTM Tech3	M	23	(Italy) Enea Bastianini	12	15	6^{3}	8	7	Ret	Ret	9^{8}	10^{7}	6^{8}	9	Ret	8	8	11	4^{4 F}	10	C	5^{9}	5^{8}			147*	10th*	169*	7th*	363*	3rd*

* Season still in progress.

== See also ==
- Aprilia RS-GP
- Honda RC213V
- Suzuki GSX-RR
- Yamaha YZR-M1
- Ducati Desmosedici
