= Takuya Tsuda =

Japanese motorcycle racer (born 1985)

- Tsuda in 2017
- Nationality: Japanese
- Born: 27 April 1985 (age 41); Japan
- Current team: Team Suzuki
- Bike number: 85
Motorcycle racing career statistics
MotoGP World Championship
Active years	2017, 2022
Manufacturers	Suzuki
Championships	0
2022 championship position	NC (0 pts)
Starts / Wins / Podiums / Poles / F. laps / Points; 2 / 0 / 0 / 0 / 0 / 0

Takuya Tsuda (Japanese: 津田 拓也, Hepburn: Tsuda Takuya; born 27 April 1985) is a Japanese motorcycle racer who competes in the JSB1000 class of the All Japan Road Race Championship for Team Suzuki, aboard a GSX-R1000R.

Tsuda has been Suzuki's primary test rider since it returned to MotoGP in 2015. He made his MotoGP debut in the 2017 Spanish Grand Prix at Jerez in place of the injured Álex Rins.

== Career statistics ==
=== Grand Prix motorcycle racing ===
==== By season ====
Season	Class	Motorcycle	Team	Race	Win	Podium	Pole	FLap	Pts	Plcd
2017	MotoGP	Suzuki	Team SUZUKI ECSTAR	1	0	0	0	0	0	29th
2022	MotoGP	Suzuki	Team Suzuki Ecstar	1	0	0	0	0	0	NC
Total				**2**	**0**	**0**	**0**	**0**	**0**	

==== By class ====
Class	Seasons	1st GP	1st Pod	1st Win	Race	Win	Podiums	Pole	FLap	Pts	WChmp
MotoGP	2017–2022	2017 Spanish			2	0	0	0	0	0	0
Total	2017–2022				**2**	**0**	**0**	**0**	**0**	**0**	**0**

==== Races by year ====
(key) (Races in bold indicate pole position, races in italics indicate fastest lap)

Year	Class	Bike	1	2	3	4	5	6	7	8	9	10	11	12	13	14	15	16	17	18	19	20	Pos	Pts
2017	MotoGP	Suzuki	QAT	ARG	AME	SPA; 17	FRA	ITA	CAT	NED	GER	CZE	AUT	GBR	RSM	ARA	JPN	AUS	MAL	VAL			29th	0
2022	MotoGP	Suzuki	QAT	INA	ARG	AME	POR	SPA	FRA	ITA	CAT	GER	NED	GBR	AUT	RSM	ARA	JPN; Ret	THA	AUS	MAL	VAL	NC	0

=== FIM Endurance World Championship ===
==== By team ====
Year	Team	Bike	Rider	TC
2012	(France) Suzuki Endurance Racing Team	Suzuki GSX-R1000	(France) Anthony Delhalle (France) Freddy Foray (France) Vincent Philippe (Japan) Yukio Kagayama (Japan) Takuya Tsuda	1st

=== Suzuka 8 Hours ===
Year	Class	Team	Co-riders	Bike	Pos	Ref
2025	**EXP**	(Japan) Team Suzuki CN Challenge	(Spain) Albert Arenas (France) Etienne Masson	Suzuki GSX-R1000R	33rd	
2026	**EXP**	(Japan) Team Suzuki CN Challenge	(Japan) Ryo Mizuo (France) Etienne Masson	Suzuki GSX-R1000R	7th	

=== All Japan Road Race Championship ===
==== Races by year ====
(key) (Races in bold indicate pole position; races in italics indicate fastest lap)

Year	Class	Bike	1	2	3	4	5	6	7	8	9	10	11	Pos	Pts
2024	JSB1000	Suzuki	SUZ; 6	MOT1; 5	MOT2; 4	SUG1; 9	SUG2; 9	MOT; 5	AUT1; 8	AUT2; 6	OKA; 5	SUZ1; Ret	SUZ2; DNS	7th	88
2025	JSB1000	Suzuki	MOT; 6	SUG1; 9	SUG2; 3	MOT1; 3	MOT2; 14	AUT1; 3	AUT2; 8	OKA; 5	SUZ1; 20	SUZ2; 8		7th	97
2026	JSB1000	Suzuki	MOT; 19†	SUG1; 9	SUG2; 12	AUT1; 8	AUT2; 9	MOT1; 8	MOT2; 6	OKA; 10	SUZ1; 11	SUZ2; 12		9th	65

- † – Rider did not finish the race, but was classified as he completed more than 75% of the race distance.
