= 2017 MotoGP World Championship =

69th running of the MotoGP World Championship

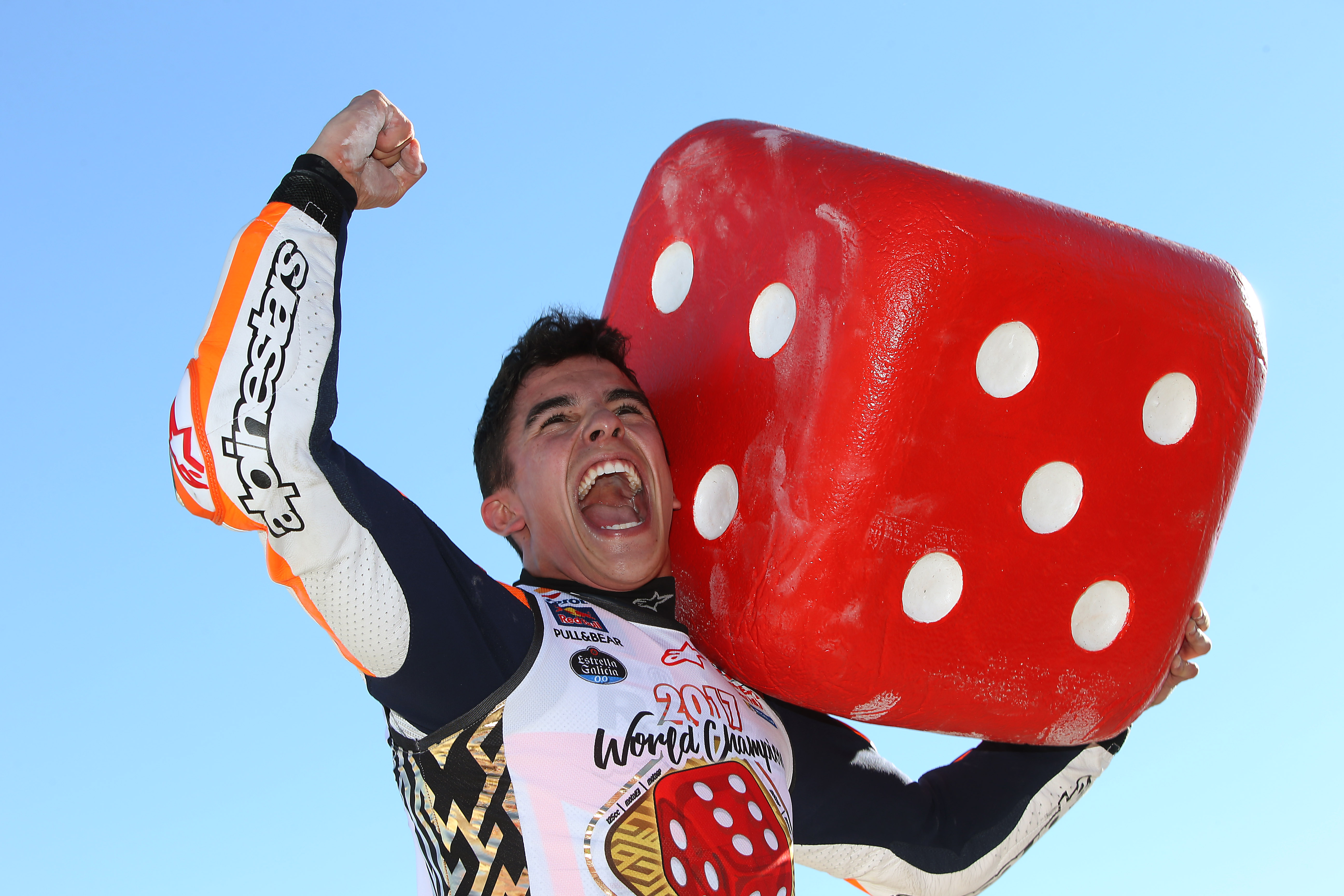
Marc Márquez was the 2017 MotoGP World Riders' Champion.

The 2017 FIM MotoGP World Championship was the premier class of the 69th Fédération Internationale de Motocyclisme (FIM) Road Racing World Championship season, the highest level of competition in motorcycle road racing.

The 2017 season saw the debut of the KTM RC16, which was previously used by Red Bull KTM Factory Racing at the 2016 Valencian Grand Prix ahead of a full season debut.

== Season summary ==
Marc Márquez started the season as defending World Champion, having secured his fifth overall title at the 2016 Japanese motorcycle Grand Prix with three races remaining.

Whilst Yamaha's new rider Maverick Viñales started the season off with two consecutive victories, the following spring season proved to be unpredictable with four different winners in as many races, following the trend from 2016. Ducati rider Andrea Dovizioso then took his first dry-track MotoGP win at Mugello before repeating the feat the following week in Barcelona. With Viñales not finishing the race at Assen, this allowed Dovizioso to lead the championship by four points after eight races, becoming the first Ducati rider to lead the championship since Casey Stoner in 2009. Márquez took the championship lead after winning the German Grand Prix. He held the championship lead until the British Grand Prix, where Dovizioso regained the lead after Márquez's engine blew up late in the race. Márquez bounced back immediately to take consecutive victories in the next two rounds to reestablish himself as championship leader. Over the following three races, Dovizioso claimed two more wins to Márquez's one, but a poor result in Australia for the Ducati rider meant that Márquez's points lead remained intact.

Going into the final round in Valencia Márquez topped the standings, 21 points ahead of Dovizioso, with both riders winning six races apiece. Viñales was third, 56 points behind Márquez. Therefore, Márquez needed to finish 11th or higher to guarantee a championship, whereas Dovizioso was forced under all circumstances to win in Valencia.

Márquez was on pole in Valencia, and Dovizioso started 9th. After Márquez saved a high-speed potential crash into turn 1, he dropped back behind Dovizioso. The title chances of Dovizioso ended when he crashed with five laps of the race remaining, losing the hope in taking the championship. Meanwhile, Márquez finished third behind Dani Pedrosa and the season's top rookie and independent rider Johann Zarco. Márquez won his sixth title and fourth MotoGP title overall.

== Calendar ==
The following Grands Prix took place in 2017:

| Round | Date | Grand Prix | Circuit |
|---|---|---|---|
| 1 | 26 March ‡ | Grand Prix of Qatar | Lusail International Circuit, Lusail |
| 2 | 9 April | Gran Premio Motul de la República Argentina | Autódromo Termas de Río Hondo, Termas de Río Hondo |
| 3 | 23 April | (United States) Red Bull Grand Prix of the Americas | Circuit of the Americas, Austin |
| 4 | 7 May | (Spain) Gran Premio Red Bull de España | Circuito de Jerez, Jerez de la Frontera |
| 5 | 21 May | HJC Helmets Grand Prix de France | Bugatti Circuit, Le Mans |
| 6 | 4 June | (Italy) Gran Premio d'Italia Oakley | Mugello Circuit, Scarperia e San Piero |
| 7 | 11 June | (Catalonia) Gran Premi Monster Energy de Catalunya | Circuit de Barcelona-Catalunya, Montmeló |
| 8 | 25 June | (Netherlands) Motul TT Assen | TT Circuit Assen, Assen |
| 9 | 2 July | (Germany) GoPro Motorrad Grand Prix Deutschland | Sachsenring, Hohenstein-Ernstthal |
| 10 | 6 August | (Czech Republic) Monster Energy Grand Prix České republiky | Brno Circuit, Brno |
| 11 | 13 August | (Austria) NeroGiardini Motorrad Grand Prix von Österreich | Red Bull Ring, Spielberg |
| 12 | 27 August | (United Kingdom) Octo British Grand Prix | Silverstone Circuit, Silverstone |
| 13 | 10 September | Gran Premio Tribul MasterCard di San Marino e della Riviera di Rimini | Misano World Circuit, Misano Adriatico |
| 14 | 24 September | (Aragon) Gran Premio Movistar de Aragón | MotorLand Aragón, Alcañiz |
| 15 | 15 October | Motul Grand Prix of Japan | Motegi Circuit, Motegi |
| 16 | 22 October | (Australia) Michelin Australian Motorcycle Grand Prix | Phillip Island Grand Prix Circuit, Phillip Island |
| 17 | 29 October | Shell Malaysia Motorcycle Grand Prix | Sepang International Circuit, Sepang |
| 18 | 12 November | (Valencian Community) Gran Premio Motul de la Comunitat Valenciana | Circuit Ricardo Tormo, Valencia |

‡ = Night race

=== Calendar changes ===
- The Austrian and Czech Republic Grand Prix swapped places, with the Czech Republic hosting the tenth round, while Austria hosts the eleventh round.
- The British Grand Prix was scheduled to move from Silverstone to the new Circuit of Wales, but construction on the new track had not commenced. The two circuits reached a deal which would see Silverstone continue to host the British Grand Prix in 2017, with an option to host the 2018 race.

== Teams and riders ==
| Team | Constructor | Motorcycle | No. | Rider | Rounds |
|---|---|---|---|---|---|
| (Italy) Aprilia Racing Team Gresini | Aprilia | RS-GP | 22 | (United Kingdom) Sam Lowes | All |
| (Italy) Aprilia Racing Team Gresini | Aprilia | RS-GP | 41 | (Spain) Aleix Espargaró | 1–16, 18 |
| (Italy) Ducati Team | Ducati | Desmosedici GP17 | 04 | (Italy) Andrea Dovizioso | All |
| (Italy) Ducati Team | Ducati | Desmosedici GP17 | 99 | (Spain) Jorge Lorenzo | All |
| (Italy) Ducati Team | Ducati | Desmosedici GP17 | 51 | (Italy) Michele Pirro | 6, 13, 18 |
| (Italy) Octo Pramac Racing | Ducati | Desmosedici GP17 | 9 | (Italy) Danilo Petrucci | All |
| (Italy) Octo Pramac Racing | Ducati | Desmosedici GP16 | 45 | (United Kingdom) Scott Redding | All |
| (Spain) Reale Avintia Racing | Ducati | Desmosedici GP16 | 8 | (Spain) Héctor Barberá | All |
| (Spain) Reale Avintia Racing | Ducati | Desmosedici GP15 | 76 | (France) Loris Baz | All |
| (Spain) Pull&Bear Aspar Team | Ducati | Desmosedici GP16 | 19 | (Spain) Álvaro Bautista | All |
| (Spain) Pull&Bear Aspar Team | Ducati | Desmosedici GP15 | 17 | (Czech Republic) Karel Abraham | All |
| (Japan) Repsol Honda Team | Honda | RC213V | 26 | (Spain) Dani Pedrosa | All |
| (Japan) Repsol Honda Team | Honda | RC213V | 93 | (Spain) Marc Márquez | All |
| (Monaco) LCR Honda | Honda | RC213V | 35 | (United Kingdom) Cal Crutchlow | All |
| (Belgium) EG 0,0 Marc VDS | Honda | RC213V | 43 | (Australia) Jack Miller | 1–14, 16–18 |
| (Belgium) EG 0,0 Marc VDS | Honda | RC213V | 7 | (Japan) Hiroshi Aoyama | 15 |
| (Belgium) EG 0,0 Marc VDS | Honda | RC213V | 53 | (Spain) Tito Rabat | All |
| (Austria) Red Bull KTM Factory Racing | KTM | RC16 | 38 | (United Kingdom) Bradley Smith | All |
| (Austria) Red Bull KTM Factory Racing | KTM | RC16 | 44 | (Spain) Pol Espargaró | All |
| (Austria) Red Bull KTM Factory Racing | KTM | RC16 | 36 | (Finland) Mika Kallio | 9, 11, 14, 18 |
| (Japan) Team Suzuki Ecstar | Suzuki | GSX-RR | 29 | (Italy) Andrea Iannone | All |
| (Japan) Team Suzuki Ecstar | Suzuki | GSX-RR | 42 | (Spain) Álex Rins | 1–3, 8–18 |
| (Japan) Team Suzuki Ecstar | Suzuki | GSX-RR | 12 | (Japan) Takuya Tsuda | 4 |
| (Japan) Team Suzuki Ecstar | Suzuki | GSX-RR | 50 | (France) Sylvain Guintoli | 5–7 |
| (Japan) Movistar Yamaha MotoGP | Yamaha | YZR-M1 | 25 | (Spain) Maverick Viñales | All |
| (Japan) Movistar Yamaha MotoGP | Yamaha | YZR-M1 | 46 | (Italy) Valentino Rossi | 1–12, 14–18 |
| (Japan) Yamalube Yamaha Factory Racing | Yamaha | YZR-M1 | 21 | (Japan) Katsuyuki Nakasuga | 15 |
| (France) Monster Yamaha Tech 3 | Yamaha | YZR-M1 | 5 | (France) Johann Zarco | All |
| (France) Monster Yamaha Tech 3 | Yamaha | YZR-M1 | 94 | (Germany) Jonas Folger | 1–14 |
| (France) Monster Yamaha Tech 3 | Yamaha | YZR-M1 | 31 | (Japan) Kohta Nozane | 15 |
| (France) Monster Yamaha Tech 3 | Yamaha | YZR-M1 | 23 | (Australia) Broc Parkes | 16 |
| (France) Monster Yamaha Tech 3 | Yamaha | YZR-M1 | 60 | (Netherlands) Michael van der Mark | 17–18 |

Key
Regular rider
Wildcard rider
Replacement rider

All the bikes used Michelin tyres.

=== Team changes ===
- Austrian manufacturer KTM joined the series with a factory-supported team for the first time.

=== Rider changes ===
- Jorge Lorenzo joined Ducati, after leaving Movistar Yamaha MotoGP. Lorenzo's move to Ducati ended his nine-year relationship with Yamaha.
- Maverick Viñales joined Yamaha, after leaving Team Suzuki Ecstar.
- Andrea Iannone joined Team Suzuki Ecstar, after leaving Ducati. He was partnered by Álex Rins who moved up to the premier class.
- Bradley Smith and Pol Espargaró left Tech 3 Yamaha to join the newly formed Red Bull KTM factory team for the 2017 season.
- Aleix Espargaró joined Aprilia Racing Team Gresini, after leaving Team Suzuki Ecstar. He was partnered by Sam Lowes who moved up to the premier class.
- Jonas Folger and Johann Zarco, the 2015 and 2016 Moto2 World Champion, moved up to the premier class, débuting with Monster Yamaha Tech 3.
- Stefan Bradl and Eugene Laverty left MotoGP for the Superbike World Championship.
- Álvaro Bautista left Aprilia Racing Team Gresini to return to Pull&Bear Aspar Team. Bautista previously competed with Aspar Team between the 2006 125cc and the 2009 250cc seasons.
- Karel Abraham returned to MotoGP with Aspar Team after previously competing in the Superbike World Championship in the 2016 season.
- Yonny Hernández returned to Moto2, after being left without a ride in MotoGP.

== Regulation changes ==
=== Technical regulations ===
- Winglets, additional aerodynamic aids first introduced in 1999, will be banned from 2017 following repeated concerns about their safety.

=== Sporting regulations ===
- A rider may be assisted by no more than four mechanics while changing bikes during a pit stop, all of whom must wear approved helmets. A mechanic may hold in the bike's clutch lever, but only the rider is allowed to select a gear.

== Results and standings ==
=== Grands Prix ===
| Round | Grand Prix | Pole position | Fastest lap | Winning rider | Winning team | Winning constructor | Report |
|---|---|---|---|---|---|---|---|
| 1 | Qatar motorcycle Grand Prix | (Spain) Maverick Viñales (Note: Grid formed by each rider's best time from any of the three free practice sessions held, after rain cancelled the planned qualifying session.) | (France) Johann Zarco | (Spain) Maverick Viñales | (Japan) Movistar Yamaha MotoGP | (Japan) Yamaha | Report |
| 2 | (Argentina) Argentine Republic motorcycle Grand Prix | (Spain) Marc Márquez | (Spain) Maverick Viñales | (Spain) Maverick Viñales | (Japan) Movistar Yamaha MotoGP | (Japan) Yamaha | Report |
| 3 | (United States) Motorcycle Grand Prix of the Americas | (Spain) Marc Márquez | (Spain) Marc Márquez | (Spain) Marc Márquez | (Japan) Repsol Honda Team | (Japan) Honda | Report |
| 4 | (Spain) Spanish motorcycle Grand Prix | (Spain) Dani Pedrosa | (Spain) Dani Pedrosa | (Spain) Dani Pedrosa | (Japan) Repsol Honda Team | (Japan) Honda | Report |
| 5 | (France) French motorcycle Grand Prix | (Spain) Maverick Viñales | (Spain) Maverick Viñales | (Spain) Maverick Viñales | (Japan) Movistar Yamaha MotoGP | (Japan) Yamaha | Report |
| 6 | (Italy) Italian motorcycle Grand Prix | (Spain) Maverick Viñales | (Spain) Maverick Viñales | (Italy) Andrea Dovizioso | (Italy) Ducati Team | (Italy) Ducati | Report |
| 7 | (Catalonia) Catalan motorcycle Grand Prix | (Spain) Dani Pedrosa | (Germany) Jonas Folger | (Italy) Andrea Dovizioso | (Italy) Ducati Team | (Italy) Ducati | Report |
| 8 | (Netherlands) Dutch TT | (France) Johann Zarco | (United Kingdom) Scott Redding | (Italy) Valentino Rossi | (Japan) Movistar Yamaha MotoGP | (Japan) Yamaha | Report |
| 9 | (Germany) German motorcycle Grand Prix | (Spain) Marc Márquez | (Germany) Jonas Folger | (Spain) Marc Márquez | (Japan) Repsol Honda Team | (Japan) Honda | Report |
| 10 | Czech Republic motorcycle Grand Prix | (Spain) Marc Márquez | (Spain) Maverick Viñales | (Spain) Marc Márquez | (Japan) Repsol Honda Team | (Japan) Honda | Report |
| 11 | (Austria) Austrian motorcycle Grand Prix | (Spain) Marc Márquez | (France) Johann Zarco | (Italy) Andrea Dovizioso | (Italy) Ducati Team | (Italy) Ducati | Report |
| 12 | (United Kingdom) British motorcycle Grand Prix | (Spain) Marc Márquez | (Spain) Marc Márquez | (Italy) Andrea Dovizioso | (Italy) Ducati Team | (Italy) Ducati | Report |
| 13 | San Marino and Rimini Riviera motorcycle Grand Prix | (Spain) Maverick Viñales | (Spain) Marc Márquez | (Spain) Marc Márquez | (Japan) Repsol Honda Team | (Japan) Honda | Report |
| 14 | Aragon motorcycle Grand Prix | (Spain) Maverick Viñales | (Spain) Dani Pedrosa | (Spain) Marc Márquez | (Japan) Repsol Honda Team | (Japan) Honda | Report |
| 15 | (Japan) Japanese motorcycle Grand Prix | (France) Johann Zarco | (Italy) Andrea Dovizioso | (Italy) Andrea Dovizioso | (Italy) Ducati Team | (Italy) Ducati | Report |
| 16 | (Australia) Australian motorcycle Grand Prix | (Spain) Marc Márquez | (France) Johann Zarco | (Spain) Marc Márquez | (Japan) Repsol Honda Team | (Japan) Honda | Report |
| 17 | (Malaysia) Malaysian motorcycle Grand Prix | (Spain) Dani Pedrosa | (Italy) Andrea Dovizioso | (Italy) Andrea Dovizioso | (Italy) Ducati Team | (Italy) Ducati | Report |
| 18 | Valencian Community motorcycle Grand Prix | (Spain) Marc Márquez | (France) Johann Zarco | (Spain) Dani Pedrosa | (Japan) Repsol Honda Team | (Japan) Honda | Report |

=== Riders' standings ===
Scoring system

Points were awarded to the top fifteen finishers. A rider had to finish the race to earn points.

| Position | **1st** | **2nd** | **3rd** | **4th** | **5th** | **6th** | **7th** | **8th** | **9th** | **10th** | **11th** | **12th** | **13th** | **14th** | **15th** |
| Points | 25 | 20 | 16 | 13 | 11 | 10 | 9 | 8 | 7 | 6 | 5 | 4 | 3 | 2 | 1 |

| Pos | Rider | Bike | Team | QAT (Qatar) | ARG (Argentina) | AME (United States) | SPA (Spain) | FRA (France) | ITA (Italy) | CAT (Catalonia) | NED (Netherlands) | GER (Germany) | CZE (Czech Republic) | AUT (Austria) | GBR (United Kingdom) | RSM (San Marino) | ARA (Aragon) | JPN (Japan) | AUS (Australia) | MAL (Malaysia) | VAL (Valencian Community) | Pts |
|---|---|---|---|---|---|---|---|---|---|---|---|---|---|---|---|---|---|---|---|---|---|---|
| 1 | (Spain) Marc Márquez | Honda | Repsol Honda Team | 4 | **Ret** | **1** | 2 | Ret | 6 | 2 | 3 | **1** | **1** | **2** | **Ret** | 1 | 1 | 2 | **1** | 4 | **3** | 298 |
| 2 | (Italy) Andrea Dovizioso | Ducati | Ducati Team | 2 | Ret | 6 | 5 | 4 | 1 | 1 | 5 | 8 | 6 | 1 | 1 | 3 | 7 | 1 | 13 | 1 | Ret | 261 |
| 3 | (Spain) Maverick Viñales | Yamaha | Movistar Yamaha MotoGP | **1** | 1 | Ret | 6 | **1** | **2** | 10 | Ret | 4 | 3 | 6 | 2 | **4** | **4** | 9 | 3 | 9 | 12 | 230 |
| 4 | (Spain) Dani Pedrosa | Honda | Repsol Honda Team | 5 | Ret | 3 | **1** | 3 | Ret | **3** | 13 | 3 | 2 | 3 | 7 | 14 | 2 | Ret | 12 | **5** | 1 | 210 |
| 5 | (Italy) Valentino Rossi | Yamaha | Movistar Yamaha MotoGP | 3 | 2 | 2 | 10 | Ret | 4 | 8 | 1 | 5 | 4 | 7 | 3 | | 5 | Ret | 2 | 7 | 5 | 208 |
| 6 | (France) Johann Zarco | Yamaha | Monster Yamaha Tech 3 | Ret | 5 | 5 | 4 | 2 | 7 | 5 | **14** | 9 | 12 | 5 | 6 | 15 | 9 | **8** | 4 | 3 | 2 | 174 |
| 7 | (Spain) Jorge Lorenzo | Ducati | Ducati Team | 11 | Ret | 9 | 3 | 6 | 8 | 4 | 15 | 11 | 15 | 4 | 5 | Ret | 3 | 6 | 15 | 2 | Ret | 137 |
| 8 | (Italy) Danilo Petrucci | Ducati | Octo Pramac Racing | Ret | 7 | 8 | 7 | Ret | 3 | Ret | 2 | 12 | 7 | Ret | Ret | 2 | 20 | 3 | 21 | 6 | 13 | 124 |
| 9 | (United Kingdom) Cal Crutchlow | Honda | LCR Honda | Ret | 3 | 4 | Ret | 5 | Ret | 11 | 4 | 10 | 5 | 15 | 4 | 13 | Ret | Ret | 5 | 15 | 8 | 112 |
| 10 | (Germany) Jonas Folger | Yamaha | Monster Yamaha Tech 3 | 10 | 6 | 11 | 8 | 7 | 13 | 6 | Ret | 2 | 10 | Ret | DNS | 9 | 16 | | | | | 84 |
| 11 | (Australia) Jack Miller | Honda | EG 0,0 Marc VDS | 8 | 9 | 10 | Ret | 8 | 15 | Ret | 6 | 15 | 14 | Ret | 16 | 6 | 13 | | 7 | 8 | 7 | 82 |
| 12 | (Spain) Álvaro Bautista | Ducati | Pull&Bear Aspar Team | Ret | 4 | 15 | Ret | Ret | 5 | 7 | Ret | 6 | Ret | 8 | 10 | 12 | 8 | Ret | 17 | 11 | Ret | 75 |
| 13 | (Italy) Andrea Iannone | Suzuki | Team Suzuki Ecstar | Ret | 16 | 7 | Ret | 10 | 10 | 16 | 9 | Ret | 19 | 11 | Ret | Ret | 12 | 4 | 6 | 17 | 6 | 70 |
| 14 | (United Kingdom) Scott Redding | Ducati | Octo Pramac Racing | 7 | 8 | 12 | 11 | Ret | 12 | 13 | Ret | 20 | 16 | 12 | 8 | 7 | 14 | 16 | 11 | 13 | Ret | 64 |
| 15 | (Spain) Aleix Espargaró | Aprilia | Aprilia Racing Team Gresini | 6 | Ret | 17 | 9 | Ret | Ret | Ret | 10 | 7 | 8 | 13 | Ret | Ret | 6 | 7 | Ret | | Ret | 62 |
| 16 | (Spain) Álex Rins | Suzuki | Team Suzuki Ecstar | 9 | Ret | DNS | | | | | 17 | 21 | 11 | 16 | 9 | 8 | 17 | 5 | 8 | DSQ | 4 | 59 |
| 17 | (Spain) Pol Espargaró | KTM | Red Bull KTM Factory Racing | 16 | 14 | Ret | Ret | 12 | Ret | 18 | 11 | 13 | 9 | Ret | 11 | 11 | 10 | 11 | 9 | 10 | Ret | 55 |
| 18 | (France) Loris Baz | Ducati | Reale Avintia Racing | 12 | 11 | Ret | 13 | 9 | 18 | 12 | 8 | 19 | Ret | 9 | 15 | 16 | 21 | 10 | 18 | Ret | 16 | 45 |
| 19 | (Spain) Tito Rabat | Honda | EG 0,0 Marc VDS | 15 | 12 | 13 | Ret | 11 | 11 | 15 | 12 | 18 | 17 | 19 | 12 | Ret | 15 | 15 | 16 | 18 | 10 | 35 |
| 20 | (Czech Republic) Karel Abraham | Ducati | Pull&Bear Aspar Team | 14 | 10 | Ret | 15 | Ret | 16 | 14 | 7 | 17 | 13 | 14 | 13 | 17 | Ret | Ret | 14 | Ret | 14 | 32 |
| 21 | (United Kingdom) Bradley Smith | KTM | Red Bull KTM Factory Racing | 17 | 15 | 16 | 14 | 13 | 20 | DNS | Ret | 14 | Ret | 18 | 17 | 10 | 19 | 17 | 10 | 12 | 11 | 29 |
| 22 | (Spain) Héctor Barberá | Ducati | Reale Avintia Racing | 13 | 13 | 14 | 12 | Ret | 14 | 9 | 16 | DSQ | 20 | 17 | 14 | Ret | 18 | 14 | 20 | 14 | 15 | 28 |
| 23 | (Italy) Michele Pirro | Ducati | Ducati Team | | | | | | 9 | | | | | | | 5 | | | | | 9 | 25 |
| 24 | (Finland) Mika Kallio | KTM | Red Bull KTM Factory Racing | | | | | | | | | 16 | | 10 | | | 11 | | | | Ret | 11 |
| 25 | (United Kingdom) Sam Lowes | Aprilia | Aprilia Racing Team Gresini | 18 | Ret | Ret | 16 | 14 | 19 | 19 | Ret | Ret | 18 | 20 | Ret | Ret | 22 | 13 | 19 | Ret | Ret | 5 |
| 26 | (Japan) Katsuyuki Nakasuga | Yamaha | Yamalube Yamaha Factory Racing | | | | | | | | | | | | | | | 12 | | | | 4 |
| 27 | (France) Sylvain Guintoli | Suzuki | Team Suzuki Ecstar | | | | | 15 | 17 | 17 | | | | | | | | | | | | 1 |
| 28 | (Netherlands) Michael van der Mark | Yamaha | Monster Yamaha Tech 3 | | | | | | | | | | | | | | | | | 16 | 17 | 0 |
| 29 | (Japan) Takuya Tsuda | Suzuki | Team Suzuki Ecstar | | | | 17 | | | | | | | | | | | | | | | 0 |
| 30 | (Japan) Hiroshi Aoyama | Honda | EG 0,0 Marc VDS | | | | | | | | | | | | | | | 18 | | | | 0 |
| 31 | (Australia) Broc Parkes | Yamaha | Monster Yamaha Tech 3 | | | | | | | | | | | | | | | | 22 | | | 0 |
| | (Japan) Kohta Nozane | Yamaha | Monster Yamaha Tech 3 | | | | | | | | | | | | | | | Ret | | | | 0 |
| Pos | Rider | Bike | Team | QAT (Qatar) | ARG (Argentina) | AME (United States) | SPA (Spain) | FRA (France) | ITA (Italy) | CAT (Catalonia) | NED (Netherlands) | GER (Germany) | CZE (Czech Republic) | AUT (Austria) | GBR (United Kingdom) | RSM (San Marino) | ARA (Aragon) | JPN (Japan) | AUS (Australia) | MAL (Malaysia) | VAL (Valencian Community) | Pts |

| Colour | Result |
|---|---|
| Gold | Winner |
| Silver | Second place |
| Bronze | Third place |
| Green | Points classification |
| Blue | Non-points classification |
| Blue | Non-classified finish (NC) |
| Purple | Retired, not classified (Ret) |
| Red | Did not qualify (DNQ) |
| Red | Did not pre-qualify (DNPQ) |
| Black | Disqualified (DSQ) |
| White | Did not start (DNS) |
| White | Withdrew (WD) |
| White | Race cancelled (C) |
| Blank | Did not practice (DNP) |
| Blank | Did not arrive (DNA) |
| Blank | Excluded (EX) |

**Bold** – Pole
Italics – Fastest Lap
Light blue – Rookie

=== Constructors' standings ===
Each constructor received the same number of points as their best placed rider in each race.

| Pos | Constructor | QAT (Qatar) | ARG (Argentina) | AME (United States) | SPA (Spain) | FRA (France) | ITA (Italy) | CAT (Catalonia) | NED (Netherlands) | GER (Germany) | CZE (Czech Republic) | AUT (Austria) | GBR (United Kingdom) | RSM (San Marino) | ARA (Aragon) | JPN (Japan) | AUS (Australia) | MAL (Malaysia) | VAL (Valencian Community) | Pts |
|---|---|---|---|---|---|---|---|---|---|---|---|---|---|---|---|---|---|---|---|---|
| 1 | (Japan) Honda | 4 | 3 | 1 | 1 | 3 | 6 | 2 | 3 | 1 | 1 | 2 | 4 | 1 | 1 | 2 | 1 | 4 | 1 | 357 |
| 2 | (Japan) Yamaha | 1 | 1 | 2 | 4 | 1 | 2 | 5 | 1 | 2 | 3 | 5 | 2 | 4 | 4 | 8 | 2 | 3 | 2 | 321 |
| 3 | (Italy) Ducati | 2 | 4 | 6 | 3 | 4 | 1 | 1 | 2 | 6 | 6 | 1 | 1 | 2 | 3 | 1 | 11 | 1 | 9 | 310 |
| 4 | (Japan) Suzuki | 9 | 16 | 7 | 17 | 10 | 10 | 16 | 9 | 21 | 11 | 11 | 9 | 8 | 12 | 4 | 6 | 17 | 4 | 100 |
| 5 | (Austria) KTM | 16 | 14 | 16 | 14 | 12 | 20 | 18 | 11 | 13 | 9 | 10 | 11 | 10 | 10 | 11 | 9 | 10 | 11 | 69 |
| 6 | (Italy) Aprilia | 6 | Ret | 17 | 9 | 14 | 19 | 19 | 10 | 7 | 8 | 13 | Ret | Ret | 6 | 7 | 19 | Ret | Ret | 64 |
| Pos | Constructor | QAT (Qatar) | ARG (Argentina) | AME (United States) | SPA (Spain) | FRA (France) | ITA (Italy) | CAT (Catalonia) | NED (Netherlands) | GER (Germany) | CZE (Czech Republic) | AUT (Austria) | GBR (United Kingdom) | RSM (San Marino) | ARA (Aragon) | JPN (Japan) | AUS (Australia) | MAL (Malaysia) | VAL (Valencian Community) | Pts |

=== Teams' standings ===
The teams' standings were based on results obtained by regular and substitute riders; wild-card entries were ineligible.

| Pos | Team | Bike No. | QAT (Qatar) | ARG (Argentina) | AME (United States) | SPA (Spain) | FRA (France) | ITA (Italy) | CAT (Catalonia) | NED (Netherlands) | GER (Germany) | CZE (Czech Republic) | AUT (Austria) | GBR (United Kingdom) | RSM (San Marino) | ARA (Aragon) | JPN (Japan) | AUS (Australia) | MAL (Malaysia) | VAL (Valencian Community) | Pts |
|---|---|---|---|---|---|---|---|---|---|---|---|---|---|---|---|---|---|---|---|---|---|
| 1 | (Japan) Repsol Honda Team | 26 | 5 | Ret | 3 | **1** | 3 | Ret | **3** | 13 | 3 | 2 | 3 | 7 | 14 | 2 | Ret | 12 | **5** | 1 | 508 |
| 1 | (Japan) Repsol Honda Team | 93 | 4 | **Ret** | **1** | 2 | Ret | 6 | 2 | 3 | **1** | **1** | **2** | **Ret** | 1 | 1 | 2 | **1** | 4 | **3** | 508 |
| 2 | (Japan) Movistar Yamaha MotoGP | 25 | **1** | 1 | Ret | 6 | **1** | **2** | 10 | Ret | 4 | 3 | 6 | 2 | **4** | **4** | 9 | 3 | 9 | 12 | 438 |
| 2 | (Japan) Movistar Yamaha MotoGP | 46 | 3 | 2 | 2 | 10 | Ret | 4 | 8 | 1 | 5 | 4 | 7 | 3 | | 5 | Ret | 2 | 7 | 5 | 438 |
| 3 | (Italy) Ducati Team | 04 | 2 | Ret | 6 | 5 | 4 | 1 | 1 | 5 | 8 | 6 | 1 | 1 | 3 | 7 | 1 | 13 | 1 | Ret | 398 |
| 3 | (Italy) Ducati Team | 99 | 11 | Ret | 9 | 3 | 6 | 8 | 4 | 15 | 11 | 15 | 4 | 5 | Ret | 3 | 6 | 15 | 2 | Ret | 398 |
| 4 | (France) Monster Yamaha Tech 3 | 5 | Ret | 5 | 5 | 4 | 2 | 7 | 5 | **14** | 9 | 12 | 5 | 6 | 15 | 9 | **8** | 4 | 3 | 2 | 258 |
| 4 | (France) Monster Yamaha Tech 3 | 23 | | | | | | | | | | | | | | | | 22 | | | 258 |
| 4 | (France) Monster Yamaha Tech 3 | 31 | | | | | | | | | | | | | | | Ret | | | | 258 |
| 4 | (France) Monster Yamaha Tech 3 | 60 | | | | | | | | | | | | | | | | | 16 | 17 | 258 |
| 4 | (France) Monster Yamaha Tech 3 | 94 | 10 | 6 | 11 | 8 | 7 | 13 | 6 | Ret | 2 | 10 | Ret | DNS | 9 | 16 | | | | | 258 |
| 5 | (Italy) Octo Pramac Racing | 9 | Ret | 7 | 8 | 7 | Ret | 3 | Ret | 2 | 12 | 7 | Ret | Ret | 2 | 20 | 3 | 21 | 6 | 13 | 188 |
| 5 | (Italy) Octo Pramac Racing | 45 | 7 | 8 | 12 | 11 | Ret | 12 | 13 | Ret | 20 | 16 | 12 | 8 | 7 | 14 | 16 | 11 | 13 | Ret | 188 |
| 6 | (Japan) Team Suzuki Ecstar | 12 | | | | 17 | | | | | | | | | | | | | | | 130 |
| 6 | (Japan) Team Suzuki Ecstar | 29 | Ret | 16 | 7 | Ret | 10 | 10 | 16 | 9 | Ret | 19 | 11 | Ret | Ret | 12 | 4 | 6 | 17 | 6 | 130 |
| 6 | (Japan) Team Suzuki Ecstar | 42 | 9 | Ret | DNS | | | | | 17 | 21 | 11 | 16 | 9 | 8 | 17 | 5 | 8 | DSQ | 4 | 130 |
| 6 | (Japan) Team Suzuki Ecstar | 50 | | | | | 15 | 17 | 17 | | | | | | | | | | | | 130 |
| 7 | (Belgium) EG 0,0 Marc VDS | 7 | | | | | | | | | | | | | | | 18 | | | | 117 |
| 7 | (Belgium) EG 0,0 Marc VDS | 43 | 8 | 9 | 10 | Ret | 8 | 15 | Ret | 6 | 15 | 14 | Ret | 16 | 6 | 13 | | 7 | 8 | 7 | 117 |
| 7 | (Belgium) EG 0,0 Marc VDS | 53 | 15 | 12 | 13 | Ret | 11 | 11 | 15 | 12 | 18 | 17 | 19 | 12 | Ret | 15 | 15 | 16 | 18 | 10 | 117 |
| 8 | (Monaco) LCR Honda | 35 | Ret | 3 | 4 | Ret | 5 | Ret | 11 | 4 | 10 | 5 | 15 | 4 | 13 | Ret | Ret | 5 | 15 | 8 | 112 |
| 9 | (Spain) Pull&Bear Aspar Team | 17 | 14 | 10 | Ret | 15 | Ret | 16 | 14 | 7 | 17 | 13 | 14 | 13 | 17 | Ret | Ret | 14 | Ret | 14 | 107 |
| 9 | (Spain) Pull&Bear Aspar Team | 19 | Ret | 4 | 15 | Ret | Ret | 5 | 7 | Ret | 6 | Ret | 8 | 10 | 12 | 8 | Ret | 17 | 11 | Ret | 107 |
| 10 | (Austria) Red Bull KTM Factory Racing | 38 | 17 | 15 | 16 | 14 | 13 | 20 | DNS | Ret | 14 | Ret | 18 | 17 | 10 | 19 | 17 | 10 | 12 | 11 | 84 |
| 10 | (Austria) Red Bull KTM Factory Racing | 44 | 16 | 14 | Ret | Ret | 12 | Ret | 18 | 11 | 13 | 9 | Ret | 11 | 11 | 10 | 11 | 9 | 10 | Ret | 84 |
| 11 | (Spain) Reale Avintia Racing | 8 | 13 | 13 | 14 | 12 | Ret | 14 | 9 | 16 | DSQ | 20 | 17 | 14 | Ret | 18 | 14 | 20 | 14 | 15 | 73 |
| 11 | (Spain) Reale Avintia Racing | 76 | 12 | 11 | Ret | 13 | 9 | 18 | 12 | 8 | 19 | Ret | 9 | 15 | 16 | 21 | 10 | 18 | Ret | 16 | 73 |
| 12 | (Italy) Aprilia Racing Team Gresini | 22 | 18 | Ret | Ret | 16 | 14 | 19 | 19 | Ret | Ret | 18 | 20 | Ret | Ret | 22 | 13 | 19 | Ret | Ret | 67 |
| 12 | (Italy) Aprilia Racing Team Gresini | 41 | 6 | Ret | 17 | 9 | Ret | Ret | Ret | 10 | 7 | 8 | 13 | Ret | Ret | 6 | 7 | Ret | | Ret | 67 |
| Pos | Team | Bike No. | QAT (Qatar) | ARG (Argentina) | AME (United States) | SPA (Spain) | FRA (France) | ITA (Italy) | CAT (Catalonia) | NED (Netherlands) | GER (Germany) | CZE (Czech Republic) | AUT (Austria) | GBR (United Kingdom) | RSM (San Marino) | ARA (Aragon) | JPN (Japan) | AUS (Australia) | MAL (Malaysia) | VAL (Valencian Community) | Pts |
