= 2017 Spanish motorcycle Grand Prix =

(Spain) 2017 Spanish Grand Prix
Race details
- Race 4 of 18 races in the 2017 Grand Prix motorcycle racing season
- Date: May 7, 2017
- Official name: Gran Premio Red Bull de España
- Location: Circuito de Jerez
- Course: Permanent racing facility; 4.423 km (2.748 mi)

MotoGP
Pole position
Rider	(Spain) Dani Pedrosa	Honda
Time	1:38.249	
Fastest lap
Rider	(Spain) Dani Pedrosa	Honda
Time	1:40.243 on lap 3	
Podium
First	(Spain) Dani Pedrosa	Honda
Second	(Spain) Marc Márquez	Honda
Third	(Spain) Jorge Lorenzo	Ducati

Moto2
Pole position
Rider	(Spain) Álex Márquez	Kalex
Time	1:42.080	
Fastest lap
Rider	(Italy) Franco Morbidelli	Kalex
Time	1:42.596 on lap 2	
Podium
First	(Spain) Álex Márquez	Kalex
Second	(Italy) Francesco Bagnaia	Kalex
Third	(Portugal) Miguel Oliveira	KTM

Moto3
Pole position
Rider	(Spain) Jorge Martín	Honda
Time	1:46.004	
Fastest lap
Rider	(Italy) Andrea Migno	KTM
Time	1:46.923 on lap 3	
Podium
First	(Spain) Arón Canet	Honda
Second	(Italy) Romano Fenati	Honda
Third	(Spain) Joan Mir	Honda

The 2017 Spanish motorcycle Grand Prix was the fourth round of the 2017 MotoGP season. It was held at the Circuito de Jerez in Jerez de la Frontera on May 7, 2017. The MotoGP race also marked the 3,000th Grand Prix World Championship race.

== Classification ==
=== MotoGP ===
Pos.	No.	Rider	Team	Manufacturer	Laps	Time/Retired	Grid	Points
1	26	(Spain) Dani Pedrosa	Repsol Honda Team	Honda	27	45:26.827	1	25
2	93	(Spain) Marc Márquez	Repsol Honda Team	Honda	27	+6.136	2	20
3	99	(Spain) Jorge Lorenzo	Ducati Team	Ducati	27	+14.767	8	16
4	5	(France) Johann Zarco	Monster Yamaha Tech 3	Yamaha	27	+17.601	6	13
5	4	(Italy) Andrea Dovizioso	Ducati Team	Ducati	27	+22.913	14	11
6	25	(Spain) Maverick Viñales	Movistar Yamaha MotoGP	Yamaha	27	+24.556	4	10
7	9	(Italy) Danilo Petrucci	Octo Pramac Racing	Ducati	27	+24.959	13	9
8	94	(Germany) Jonas Folger	Monster Yamaha Tech 3	Yamaha	27	+27.721	9	8
9	41	(Spain) Aleix Espargaró	Aprilia Racing Team Gresini	Aprilia	27	+31.233	12	7
10	46	(Italy) Valentino Rossi	Movistar Yamaha MotoGP	Yamaha	27	+38.682	7	6
11	45	(United Kingdom) Scott Redding	Octo Pramac Racing	Ducati	27	+40.979	11	5
12	8	(Spain) Héctor Barberá	Reale Avintia Racing	Ducati	27	+43.199	21	4
13	76	(France) Loris Baz	Reale Avintia Racing	Ducati	27	+43.211	20	3
14	38	(United Kingdom) Bradley Smith	Red Bull KTM Factory Racing	KTM	27	+47.964	16	2
15	17	(Czech Republic) Karel Abraham	Pull&Bear Aspar Team	Ducati	27	+51.279	19	1
16	22	(United Kingdom) Sam Lowes	Aprilia Racing Team Gresini	Aprilia	27	+1:08.885	22	
17	12	(Japan) Takuya Tsuda	Team Suzuki Ecstar	Suzuki	27	+1:27.450	23	
Ret	29	(Italy) Andrea Iannone	Team Suzuki Ecstar	Suzuki	9	Accident	5	
Ret	53	(Spain) Tito Rabat	EG 0,0 Marc VDS	Honda	9	Accident	18	
Ret	35	(United Kingdom) Cal Crutchlow	LCR Honda	Honda	5	Accident	3	
Ret	43	(Australia) Jack Miller	EG 0,0 Marc VDS	Honda	5	Collision	10	
Ret	19	(Spain) Álvaro Bautista	Pull&Bear Aspar Team	Ducati	5	Collision Damage	17	
Ret	44	(Spain) Pol Espargaró	Red Bull KTM Factory Racing	KTM	5	Accident	15	

=== Moto2 ===
Pos.	No.	Rider	Manufacturer	Laps	Time/Retired	Grid	Points
1	73	(Spain) Álex Márquez	Kalex	25	43:24.350	1	25
2	42	(Italy) Francesco Bagnaia	Kalex	25	+3.442	6	20
3	44	(Portugal) Miguel Oliveira	KTM	25	+4.958	4	16
4	54	(Italy) Mattia Pasini	Kalex	25	+6.824	5	13
5	10	(Italy) Luca Marini	Kalex	25	+6.917	11	11
6	23	(Germany) Marcel Schrötter	Suter	25	+9.561	9	10
7	77	(Switzerland) Dominique Aegerter	Suter	25	+10.266	3	9
8	12	(Switzerland) Thomas Lüthi	Kalex	25	+11.594	12	8
9	68	(Colombia) Yonny Hernández	Kalex	25	+19.212	22	7
10	49	(Spain) Axel Pons	Kalex	25	+19.293	10	6
11	7	(Italy) Lorenzo Baldassarri	Kalex	25	+19.672	19	5
12	9	(Spain) Jorge Navarro	Kalex	25	+24.487	21	4
13	55	(Malaysia) Hafizh Syahrin	Kalex	25	+25.522	15	3
14	88	(Spain) Ricard Cardús	KTM	25	+26.049	18	2
15	45	(Japan) Tetsuta Nagashima	Kalex	25	+26.089	24	1
16	40	(France) Fabio Quartararo	Kalex	25	+29.877	14	
17	57	(Spain) Edgar Pons	Kalex	25	+33.799	23	
18	32	(Spain) Isaac Viñales	Kalex	25	+35.196	27	
19	19	(Belgium) Xavier Siméon	Kalex	25	+40.950	17	
20	2	(Switzerland) Jesko Raffin	Kalex	25	+43.165	26	
21	30	(Japan) Takaaki Nakagami	Kalex	25	+43.282	8	
22	87	(Australia) Remy Gardner	Tech 3	25	+47.675	28	
23	47	(Italy) Axel Bassani	Speed Up	25	+48.478	30	
24	22	(Italy) Federico Fuligni	Suter	25	+1:11.416	31	
25	62	(Italy) Stefano Manzi	Kalex	25	+1:15.738	32	
26	5	(Italy) Andrea Locatelli	Kalex	24	+1 lap	25	
Ret	11	(Germany) Sandro Cortese	Suter	16	Accident	20	
Ret	97	(Spain) Xavi Vierge	Tech 3	16	Handling	7	
Ret	89	(Malaysia) Khairul Idham Pawi	Kalex	13	Accident	16	
Ret	27	(Spain) Iker Lecuona	Kalex	11	Rider In Pain	29	
Ret	21	(Italy) Franco Morbidelli	Kalex	8	Accident Damage	2	
Ret	24	(Italy) Simone Corsi	Speed Up	2	Accident	13	
OFFICIAL MOTO2 REPORT

=== Moto3 ===
Pos.	No.	Rider	Manufacturer	Laps	Time/Retired	Grid	Points
1	44	(Spain) Arón Canet	Honda	23	41:25.706	2	25
2	5	(Italy) Romano Fenati	Honda	23	+0.031	3	20
3	36	(Spain) Joan Mir	Honda	23	+0.155	9	16
4	42	(Spain) Marcos Ramírez	KTM	23	+0.358	5	13
5	21	(Italy) Fabio Di Giannantonio	Honda	23	+0.946	11	11
6	16	(Italy) Andrea Migno	KTM	23	+1.162	8	10
7	8	(Italy) Nicolò Bulega	KTM	23	+1.417	4	9
8	33	(Italy) Enea Bastianini	Honda	23	+1.456	14	8
9	88	(Spain) Jorge Martín	Honda	23	+1.961	1	7
10	58	(Spain) Juan Francisco Guevara	KTM	23	+2.000	12	6
11	64	(Netherlands) Bo Bendsneyder	KTM	23	+7.431	23	5
12	95	(France) Jules Danilo	Honda	23	+9.958	24	4
13	19	(Argentina) Gabriel Rodrigo	KTM	23	+10.028	16	3
14	75	(Spain) Albert Arenas	Mahindra	23	+10.665	13	2
15	71	(Japan) Ayumu Sasaki	Honda	23	+14.062	15	1
16	11	(Belgium) Livio Loi	Honda	23	+20.451	18	
17	27	(Japan) Kaito Toba	Honda	23	+20.699	27	
18	84	(Czech Republic) Jakub Kornfeil	Peugeot	23	+20.836	21	
19	48	(Italy) Lorenzo Dalla Porta	Mahindra	23	+21.624	17	
20	40	(South Africa) Darryn Binder	KTM	23	+34.081	10	
21	41	(Thailand) Nakarin Atiratphuvapat	Honda	23	+37.754	30	
22	23	(Italy) Niccolò Antonelli	KTM	23	+37.799	6	
23	14	(Italy) Tony Arbolino	Honda	23	+37.915	28	
24	6	(Spain) María Herrera	KTM	23	+38.014	22	
25	31	(Spain) Raúl Fernández	Mahindra	23	+57.408	31	
26	4	(Finland) Patrik Pulkkinen	Peugeot	23	+57.494	32	
27	96	(Italy) Manuel Pagliani	Mahindra	23	+1:00.920	29	
Ret	17	(United Kingdom) John McPhee	Honda	14	Accident Damage	25	
Ret	12	(Italy) Marco Bezzecchi	Mahindra	13	Accident Damage	26	
Ret	7	(Malaysia) Adam Norrodin	Honda	12	Accident	19	
Ret	24	(Japan) Tatsuki Suzuki	Honda	3	Accident	7	
Ret	63	(Spain) Vicente Pérez	KTM	1	Accident	20	
DNS	65	(Germany) Philipp Öttl	KTM		Did not start		
OFFICIAL MOTO3 REPORT

- Philipp Öttl suffered a broken collarbone in a crash during qualifying and withdrew from the event.

== Championship standings after the race ==
=== MotoGP ===
Below are the standings for the top five riders and constructors after round four has concluded.

Riders' Championship standings

Pos.	Rider	Points
1	(Italy) Valentino Rossi	62
2	(Spain) Maverick Viñales	60
3	(Spain) Marc Márquez	58
4	(Spain) Dani Pedrosa	52
5	(Italy) Andrea Dovizioso	41

Constructors' Championship standings

Pos.	Constructor	Points
1	(Japan) Yamaha	83
2	(Japan) Honda	79
3	(Italy) Ducati	59
4	(Italy) Aprilia	17
5	(Japan) Suzuki	16

- Note: Only the top five positions are included for both sets of standings.

=== Moto2 ===
Pos.	Rider	Points
1	(Italy) Franco Morbidelli	75
2	(Switzerland) Thomas Lüthi	64
3	(Portugal) Miguel Oliveira	59
4	(Spain) Álex Márquez	49
5	(Italy) Francesco Bagnaia	33
6	(Japan) Takaaki Nakagami	32
7	(Italy) Luca Marini	31
8	(Switzerland) Dominique Aegerter	27
9	(Italy) Lorenzo Baldassarri	26
10	(Spain) Xavi Vierge	25

=== Moto3 ===
Pos.	Rider	Points
1	(Spain) Joan Mir	74
2	(Italy) Romano Fenati	65
3	(Spain) Jorge Martín	59
4	(United Kingdom) John McPhee	49
5	(Spain) Arón Canet	43
6	(Italy) Fabio Di Giannantonio	35
7	(Italy) Andrea Migno	35
8	(Spain) Marcos Ramírez	23
9	(Spain) Juan Francisco Guevara	23
10	(Italy) Nicolò Bulega	22

Previous race: 2017 Grand Prix of the Americas	FIM Grand Prix World Championship; 2017 season	Next race: 2017 French Grand Prix
Previous race: 2016 Spanish Grand Prix	Spanish motorcycle Grand Prix	Next race: 2018 Spanish Grand Prix
