= 2017 Catalan motorcycle Grand Prix =

(Catalonia) 2017 Catalan Grand Prix
Race details
- Race 7 of 18 races in the 2017 Grand Prix motorcycle racing season
- Date: June 11, 2017
- Official name: Gran Premi Monster Energy de Catalunya
- Location: Circuit de Barcelona-Catalunya
- Course: Permanent racing facility; 4.655 (Note: 4.652 km (2.891 mi) for Friday practice sessions. MotoGP used the F1 chicane after the newly constructed motorcycle chicane was deemed dangerous by riders. See the 2016 race for reference to the chicane.) km (2.892 mi)

MotoGP
Pole position
Rider	(Spain) Dani Pedrosa	Honda
Time	1:43.870	
Fastest lap
Rider	(Germany) Jonas Folger	Yamaha
Time	1:45.969 on lap 3	
Podium
First	(Italy) Andrea Dovizioso	Ducati
Second	(Spain) Marc Márquez	Honda
Third	(Spain) Dani Pedrosa	Honda

Moto2
Pole position
Rider	(Spain) Álex Márquez	Kalex
Time	1:49.408	
Fastest lap
Rider	(Spain) Álex Márquez	Kalex
Time	1:49.712 on lap 2	
Podium
First	(Spain) Álex Márquez	Kalex
Second	(Switzerland) Thomas Lüthi	Kalex
Third	(Portugal) Miguel Oliveira	KTM

Moto3
Pole position
Rider	(Spain) Jorge Martín	Honda
Time	1:53.368	
Fastest lap
Rider	(Spain) Jorge Martín	Honda
Time	1:53.861 on lap 4	
Podium
First	(Spain) Joan Mir	Honda
Second	(Italy) Romano Fenati	Honda
Third	(Spain) Jorge Martín	Honda

The 2017 Catalan motorcycle Grand Prix was the seventh round of the 2017 MotoGP season. It was held at the Circuit de Barcelona-Catalunya in Montmeló on June 11, 2017.

== Classification ==
=== MotoGP ===
Pos.	No.	Rider	Team	Manufacturer	Laps	Time/Retired	Grid	Points
1	4	(Italy) Andrea Dovizioso	Ducati Team	Ducati	25	44:41.518	7	25
2	93	(Spain) Marc Márquez	Repsol Honda Team	Honda	25	+3.544	4	20
3	26	(Spain) Dani Pedrosa	Repsol Honda Team	Honda	25	+6.774	1	16
4	99	(Spain) Jorge Lorenzo	Ducati Team	Ducati	25	+9.608	2	13
5	5	(France) Johann Zarco	Monster Yamaha Tech 3	Yamaha	25	+13.838	14	11
6	94	(Germany) Jonas Folger	Monster Yamaha Tech 3	Yamaha	25	+13.921	8	10
7	19	(Spain) Álvaro Bautista	Pull&Bear Aspar Team	Ducati	25	+16.763	10	9
8	46	(Italy) Valentino Rossi	Movistar Yamaha MotoGP	Yamaha	25	+20.821	13	8
9	8	(Spain) Héctor Barberá	Reale Avintia Racing	Ducati	25	+23.952	6	7
10	25	(Spain) Maverick Viñales	Movistar Yamaha MotoGP	Yamaha	25	+24.189	9	6
11	35	(United Kingdom) Cal Crutchlow	LCR Honda	Honda	25	+28.329	17	5
12	76	(France) Loris Baz	Reale Avintia Racing	Ducati	25	+33.281 (Note: 0.3 second penalty.)	16	4
13	45	(United Kingdom) Scott Redding	Octo Pramac Racing	Ducati	25	+35.200	11	3
14	17	(Czech Republic) Karel Abraham	Pull & Bear Aspar Team	Ducati	25	+39.436 (Note: 0.4 second penalty.)	18	2
15	53	(Spain) Tito Rabat	EG 0,0 Marc VDS	Honda	25	+40.872	19	1
16	29	(Italy) Andrea Iannone	Team Suzuki Ecstar	Suzuki	25	+43.221	12	
17	50	(France) Sylvain Guintoli	Team Suzuki Ecstar	Suzuki	25	+44.655	22	
18	44	(Spain) Pol Espargaró	Red Bull KTM Factory Racing	KTM	25	+48.993	20	
19	22	(United Kingdom) Sam Lowes	Aprilia Racing Team Gresini	Aprilia	25	+55.492	21	
Ret	9	(Italy) Danilo Petrucci	Octo Pramac Racing	Ducati	23	Accident	3	
Ret	43	(Australia) Jack Miller	EG 0,0 Marc VDS	Honda	13	Accident	15	
Ret	41	(Spain) Aleix Espargaró	Aprilia Racing Team Gresini	Aprilia	7	Electronics	5	
DNS	38	(United Kingdom) Bradley Smith	Red Bull KTM Factory Racing	KTM		Did not start		
Sources:

- Bradley Smith withdrew from the event after suffering a hand injury in a crash during free practice.

=== Moto2 ===
Pos.	No.	Rider	Manufacturer	Laps	Time/Retired	Grid	Points
1	73	(Spain) Álex Márquez	Kalex	23	42:40.502	1	25
2	12	(Switzerland) Thomas Lüthi	Kalex	23	+4.452	5	20
3	44	(Portugal) Miguel Oliveira	KTM	23	+5.322	7	16
4	7	(Italy) Lorenzo Baldassarri	Kalex	23	+9.930	3	13
5	21	(Italy) Franco Morbidelli	Kalex	23	+14.172	6	11
6	9	(Spain) Jorge Navarro	Kalex	23	+16.192	8	10
7	40	(France) Fabio Quartararo	Kalex	23	+18.217	14	9
8	97	(Spain) Xavi Vierge	Tech 3	23	+19.096	11	8
9	55	(Malaysia) Hafizh Syahrin	Kalex	23	+19.179	23	7
10	30	(Japan) Takaaki Nakagami	Kalex	23	+19.361	4	6
11	24	(Italy) Simone Corsi	Speed Up	23	+19.957	13	5
12	32	(Spain) Isaac Viñales	Kalex	23	+20.984	10	4
13	42	(Italy) Francesco Bagnaia	Kalex	23	+22.220	20	3
14	5	(Italy) Andrea Locatelli	Kalex	23	+23.501	18	2
15	68	(Colombia) Yonny Hernández	Kalex	23	+23.565	16	1
16	77	(Switzerland) Dominique Aegerter	Suter	23	+24.423	19	
17	41	(South Africa) Brad Binder	KTM	23	+24.776	21	
18	49	(Spain) Axel Pons	Kalex	23	+25.257	9	
19	87	(Australia) Remy Gardner	Tech 3	23	+29.261	26	
20	19	(Belgium) Xavier Siméon	Kalex	23	+30.062	22	
21	37	(Spain) Augusto Fernández	Speed Up	23	+38.420	28	
22	57	(Spain) Edgar Pons	Kalex	23	+47.235	29	
23	2	(Switzerland) Jesko Raffin	Kalex	23	+47.390	24	
24	27	(Spain) Iker Lecuona	Kalex	23	+54.588	27	
25	89	(Malaysia) Khairul Idham Pawi	Kalex	23	+55.085	32	
26	45	(Japan) Tetsuta Nagashima	Kalex	23	+57.049	17	
27	22	(Italy) Federico Fuligni	Kalex	23	+1:07.344	30	
Ret	23	(Germany) Marcel Schrötter	Suter	21	Accident	15	
Ret	62	(Italy) Stefano Manzi	Kalex	15	Front Tyre	25	
Ret	11	(Germany) Sandro Cortese	Suter	11	Accident	12	
Ret	6	(United Kingdom) Tarran Mackenzie	Suter	3	Accident	31	
DSQ	54	(Italy) Mattia Pasini	Kalex	23	(+3.525) (Note: Disqualified due to a technical infringement.)	2	
DNS	10	(Italy) Luca Marini	Kalex		Did not start		
OFFICIAL MOTO2 REPORT

=== Moto3 ===
Pos.	No.	Rider	Manufacturer	Laps	Time/Retired	Grid	Points
1	36	(Spain) Joan Mir	Honda	22	42:11.846	4	25
2	5	(Italy) Romano Fenati	Honda	22	+0.191	3	20
3	88	(Spain) Jorge Martín	Honda	22	+0.279	1	16
4	33	(Italy) Enea Bastianini	Honda	22	+0.462	7	13
5	44	(Spain) Arón Canet	Honda	22	+0.674	5 (Note: 3-place grid penalty.)	11
6	42	(Spain) Marcos Ramírez	KTM	22	+0.740	6	10
7	21	(Italy) Fabio Di Giannantonio	Honda	22	+1.143	8	9
8	16	(Italy) Andrea Migno	KTM	22	+1.389 (Note: 0.5 second penalty.)	20	8
9	8	(Italy) Nicolò Bulega	KTM	22	+1.662	16	7
10	24	(Japan) Tatsuki Suzuki	Honda	22	+1.863	9	6
11	23	(Italy) Niccolò Antonelli	KTM	22	+2.088	10	5
12	17	(United Kingdom) John McPhee	Honda	22	+5.671	17	4
13	65	(Germany) Philipp Öttl	KTM	22	+8.631	15	3
14	12	(Italy) Marco Bezzecchi	Mahindra	22	+16.603	24	2
15	64	(Netherlands) Bo Bendsneyder	KTM	22	+17.089	13	1
16	71	(Japan) Ayumu Sasaki	Honda	22	+17.128	18	
17	58	(Spain) Juan Francisco Guevara	KTM	22	+21.614	2	
18	7	(Malaysia) Adam Norrodin	Honda	22	+22.362	30	
19	48	(Italy) Lorenzo Dalla Porta	Mahindra	22	+22.718	12	
20	96	(Italy) Manuel Pagliani	Mahindra	22	+22.754	26	
21	41	(Thailand) Nakarin Atiratphuvapat	Honda	22	+22.888	23	
22	84	(Czech Republic) Jakub Kornfeil	Peugeot	22	+23.376	29	
23	27	(Japan) Kaito Toba	Honda	22	+24.243	14	
24	14	(Italy) Tony Arbolino	Honda	22	+33.334	25 (Note: 12-place grid penalty.)	
25	11	(Belgium) Livio Loi	Honda	22	+33.396	22	
26	6	(Spain) María Herrera	KTM	22	+41.707	28	
27	4	(Finland) Patrik Pulkkinen	Peugeot	22	+1:10.768	32	
28	81	(Spain) Aleix Viu	KTM	22	+1:33.544 (Note: 2 second penalty.)	31	
Ret	40	(South Africa) Darryn Binder	KTM	21	Accident	21	
Ret	95	(France) Jules Danilo	Honda	21	Accident	19	
Ret	19	(Argentina) Gabriel Rodrigo	KTM	6	Accident	11	
Ret	63	(Spain) Vicente Pérez	KTM	4	Accident	27	
OFFICIAL MOTO3 REPORT

== Championship standings after the race ==
=== MotoGP ===
Below are the standings for the top five riders and constructors after round seven has concluded.

Riders' Championship standings

Pos.	Rider	Points
1	(Spain) Maverick Viñales	111
2	(Italy) Andrea Dovizioso	104
3	(Spain) Marc Márquez	88
4	(Spain) Dani Pedrosa	84
5	(Italy) Valentino Rossi	83

Constructors' Championship standings

Pos.	Constructor	Points
1	(Japan) Yamaha	139
2	(Japan) Honda	125
3	(Italy) Ducati	122
4	(Japan) Suzuki	28
5	(Italy) Aprilia	19

- Note: Only the top five positions are included for both sets of standings.

=== Moto2 ===
Pos.	Rider	Points
1	(Italy) Franco Morbidelli	124
2	(Switzerland) Thomas Lüthi	120
3	(Spain) Álex Márquez	103
4	(Portugal) Miguel Oliveira	86
5	(Italy) Francesco Bagnaia	56
6	(Italy) Mattia Pasini	49
7	(Japan) Takaaki Nakagami	47
8	(Switzerland) Dominique Aegerter	46
9	(Italy) Luca Marini	41
10	(Spain) Xavi Vierge	40

=== Moto3 ===
Pos.	Rider	Points
1	(Spain) Joan Mir	133
2	(Italy) Romano Fenati	88
3	(Spain) Arón Canet	85
4	(Italy) Fabio Di Giannantonio	80
5	(Italy) Andrea Migno	76
6	(Spain) Jorge Martín	76
7	(United Kingdom) John McPhee	67
8	(Spain) Marcos Ramírez	53
9	(Spain) Juan Francisco Guevara	50
10	(Italy) Enea Bastianini	49

== Notes ==
Previous race: 2017 Italian Grand Prix	FIM Grand Prix World Championship; 2017 season	Next race: 2017 Dutch TT
Previous race: 2016 Catalan Grand Prix	Catalan motorcycle Grand Prix	Next race: 2018 Catalan Grand Prix
