= 2017 Motorcycle Grand Prix of the Americas =

(United States) 2017 Grand Prix of the Americas
Race details
- Race 3 of 18 races in the 2017 Grand Prix motorcycle racing season
- Date: April 23, 2017
- Official name: Red Bull Grand Prix of the Americas
- Location: Circuit of the Americas
- Course: Permanent racing facility; 5.513 km (3.426 mi)

MotoGP
Pole position
| Rider | (Spain) Marc Márquez | Honda |
| Time | 2:02.741 | |
Fastest lap
| Rider | (Spain) Marc Márquez | Honda |
| Time | 2:04.899 on lap 15 | |
Podium
| First | (Spain) Marc Márquez | Honda |
| Second | (Italy) Valentino Rossi | Yamaha |
| Third | (Spain) Dani Pedrosa | Honda |

Moto2
Pole position
| Rider | (Italy) Franco Morbidelli | Kalex |
| Time | 2:09.379 | |
Fastest lap
| Rider | (Italy) Franco Morbidelli | Kalex |
| Time | 2:09.948 on lap 7 | |
Podium
| First | (Italy) Franco Morbidelli | Kalex |
| Second | (Switzerland) Thomas Lüthi | Kalex |
| Third | (Japan) Takaaki Nakagami | Kalex |

Moto3
Pole position
| Rider | (Spain) Arón Canet | Honda |
| Time | 2:14.644 | |
Fastest lap
| Rider | (Spain) Arón Canet | Honda |
| Time | 2:15.583 on lap 2 | |
Podium
| First | (Italy) Romano Fenati | Honda |
| Second | (Spain) Jorge Martín | Honda |
| Third | (Italy) Fabio Di Giannantonio | Honda |

The 2017 Motorcycle Grand Prix of the Americas was the third round of the 2017 MotoGP season. It was held at the Circuit of the Americas in Austin on April 23, 2017.

== Classification ==
=== MotoGP ===
| Pos. | No. | Rider | Team | Manufacturer | Laps | Time/Retired | Grid | Points |
|---|---|---|---|---|---|---|---|---|
| 1 | 93 | (Spain) Marc Márquez | Repsol Honda Team | Honda | 21 | 43:58.770 | 1 | 25 |
| 2 | 46 | (Italy) Valentino Rossi | Movistar Yamaha MotoGP | Yamaha | 21 | +3.069 (Note: 0.3 second penalty.) | 3 | 20 |
| 3 | 26 | (Spain) Dani Pedrosa | Repsol Honda Team | Honda | 21 | +5.112 | 4 | 16 |
| 4 | 35 | (United Kingdom) Cal Crutchlow | LCR Honda | Honda | 21 | +7.638 | 9 | 13 |
| 5 | 5 | (France) Johann Zarco | Monster Yamaha Tech 3 | Yamaha | 21 | +7.957 | 5 | 11 |
| 6 | 4 | (Italy) Andrea Dovizioso | Ducati Team | Ducati | 21 | +14.058 | 7 | 10 |
| 7 | 29 | (Italy) Andrea Iannone | Team Suzuki Ecstar | Suzuki | 21 | +15.491 | 11 | 9 |
| 8 | 9 | (Italy) Danilo Petrucci | Octo Pramac Racing | Ducati | 21 | +16.772 | 13 | 8 |
| 9 | 99 | (Spain) Jorge Lorenzo | Ducati Team | Ducati | 21 | +17.979 | 6 | 7 |
| 10 | 43 | (Australia) Jack Miller | EG 0,0 Marc VDS | Honda | 21 | +18.494 | 12 | 6 |
| 11 | 94 | (Germany) Jonas Folger | Monster Yamaha Tech 3 | Yamaha | 21 | +18.903 | 8 | 5 |
| 12 | 45 | (United Kingdom) Scott Redding | Octo Pramac Racing | Ducati | 21 | +28.735 | 10 | 4 |
| 13 | 53 | (Spain) Tito Rabat | EG 0,0 Marc VDS | Honda | 21 | +30.041 | 16 | 3 |
| 14 | 8 | (Spain) Héctor Barberá | Reale Avintia Racing | Ducati | 21 | +31.364 | 15 | 2 |
| 15 | 19 | (Spain) Álvaro Bautista | Pull&Bear Aspar Team | Ducati | 21 | +1:06.547 | 19 | 1 |
| 16 | 38 | (United Kingdom) Bradley Smith | Red Bull KTM Factory Racing | KTM | 21 | +1:22.090 | 18 | |
| 17 | 41 | (Spain) Aleix Espargaró | Aprilia Racing Team Gresini | Aprilia | 19 | +2 laps | 22 | |
| Ret | 22 | (United Kingdom) Sam Lowes | Aprilia Racing Team Gresini | Aprilia | 11 | Accident | 20 | |
| Ret | 44 | (Spain) Pol Espargaró | Red Bull KTM Factory Racing | KTM | 9 | Clutch | 21 | |
| Ret | 76 | (France) Loris Baz | Reale Avintia Racing | Ducati | 8 | Accident | 14 | |
| Ret | 25 | (Spain) Maverick Viñales | Movistar Yamaha MotoGP | Yamaha | 1 | Accident | 2 | |
| Ret | 17 | (Czech Republic) Karel Abraham | Pull&Bear Aspar Team | Ducati | 1 | Accident | 17 | |
| DNS | 42 | (Spain) Álex Rins | Team Suzuki Ecstar | Suzuki | | Did not start | | |
Sources:

- Álex Rins suffered a broken forearm in a crash during Saturday practice and withdrew from the event.

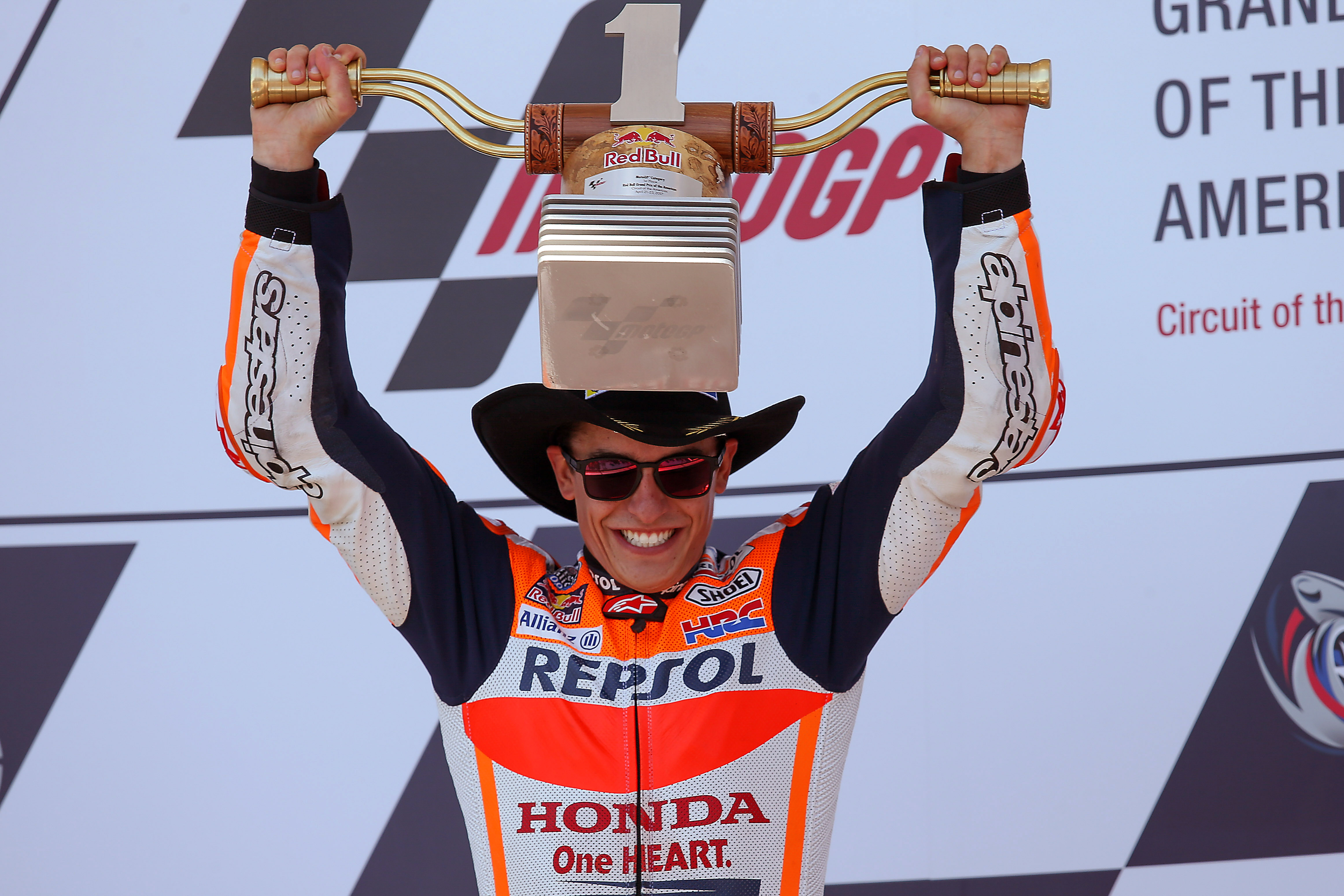
Marc Márquez, holding his first place trophy on the podium after winning the MotoGP race.

=== Moto2 ===
| Pos. | No. | Rider | Manufacturer | Laps | Time/Retired | Grid | Points |
|---|---|---|---|---|---|---|---|
| 1 | 21 | (Italy) Franco Morbidelli | Kalex | 19 | 41:20.078 | 1 | 25 |
| 2 | 12 | (Switzerland) Thomas Lüthi | Kalex | 19 | +2.633 | 5 | 20 |
| 3 | 30 | (Japan) Takaaki Nakagami | Kalex | 19 | +6.809 | 4 | 16 |
| 4 | 73 | (Spain) Álex Márquez | Kalex | 19 | +9.852 | 3 | 13 |
| 5 | 77 | (Switzerland) Dominique Aegerter | Suter | 19 | +10.927 | 6 | 11 |
| 6 | 44 | (Portugal) Miguel Oliveira | KTM | 19 | +13.029 | 7 | 10 |
| 7 | 24 | (Italy) Simone Corsi | Speed Up | 19 | +13.335 | 17 | 9 |
| 8 | 23 | (Germany) Marcel Schrötter | Suter | 19 | +13.754 | 11 | 8 |
| 9 | 97 | (Spain) Xavi Vierge | Tech 3 | 19 | +18.079 | 12 | 7 |
| 10 | 10 | (Italy) Luca Marini | Kalex | 19 | +21.418 | 23 | 6 |
| 11 | 55 | (Malaysia) Hafizh Syahrin | Kalex | 19 | +21.430 | 19 | 5 |
| 12 | 40 | (France) Fabio Quartararo | Kalex | 19 | +21.736 | 16 | 4 |
| 13 | 19 | (Belgium) Xavier Siméon | Kalex | 19 | +21.974 | 8 | 3 |
| 14 | 88 | (Spain) Ricard Cardús | KTM | 19 | +24.245 | 10 | 2 |
| 15 | 9 | (Spain) Jorge Navarro | Kalex | 19 | +24.863 | 13 | 1 |
| 16 | 42 | (Italy) Francesco Bagnaia | Kalex | 19 | +28.226 | 15 | |
| 17 | 32 | (Spain) Isaac Viñales | Kalex | 19 | +28.443 | 22 | |
| 18 | 49 | (Spain) Axel Pons | Kalex | 19 | +34.767 | 20 | |
| 19 | 45 | (Japan) Tetsuta Nagashima | Kalex | 19 | +37.279 | 26 | |
| 20 | 5 | (Italy) Andrea Locatelli | Kalex | 19 | +37.530 | 28 | |
| 21 | 2 | (Switzerland) Jesko Raffin | Kalex | 19 | +38.953 | 24 | |
| 22 | 54 | (Italy) Mattia Pasini | Kalex | 19 | +43.720 | 2 | |
| 23 | 11 | (Germany) Sandro Cortese | Suter | 19 | +51.515 | 9 | |
| 24 | 47 | (Italy) Axel Bassani | Speed Up | 19 | +1:07.841 | 30 | |
| 25 | 89 | (Malaysia) Khairul Idham Pawi | Kalex | 19 | +1:08.137 | 27 | |
| Ret | 57 | (Spain) Edgar Pons | Kalex | 2 | Accident | 25 | |
| Ret | 7 | (Italy) Lorenzo Baldassarri | Kalex | 0 | Accident | 14 | |
| Ret | 68 | (Colombia) Yonny Hernández | Kalex | 0 | Accident | 18 | |
| Ret | 60 | (Spain) Julián Simón | Tech 3 | 0 | Accident | 21 | |
| Ret | 62 | (Italy) Stefano Manzi | Kalex | 0 | Accident | 29 | |
| DNS | 52 | (United Kingdom) Danny Kent | Suter | | Did not start | | |
| DNS | 27 | (Spain) Iker Lecuona | Kalex | | Did not start | | |
OFFICIAL MOTO2 REPORT

- Lecuona pulled out of the race due to pain in the arm he'd broken during pre-season testing. Kent cited a pinched nerve in his back but later quit the team.

=== Moto3 ===
The race, scheduled to be run for 18 laps, was red-flagged due to Kaito Toba's crash in Turn 14 and was later restarted over 12 laps.

| Pos. | No. | Rider | Manufacturer | Laps | Time/Retired | Grid | Points |
|---|---|---|---|---|---|---|---|
| 1 | 5 | (Italy) Romano Fenati | Honda | 12 | 27:15.841 | 3 | 25 |
| 2 | 88 | (Spain) Jorge Martín | Honda | 12 | +4.504 | 5 | 20 |
| 3 | 21 | (Italy) Fabio Di Giannantonio | Honda | 12 | +4.527 | 6 | 16 |
| 4 | 33 | (Italy) Enea Bastianini | Honda | 12 | +4.673 | 7 | 13 |
| 5 | 8 | (Italy) Nicolò Bulega | KTM | 12 | +4.968 | 4 | 11 |
| 6 | 58 | (Spain) Juan Francisco Guevara | KTM | 12 | +5.618 | 13 | 10 |
| 7 | 17 | (United Kingdom) John McPhee | Honda | 12 | +5.687 | 9 | 9 |
| 8 | 36 | (Spain) Joan Mir | Honda | 12 | +5.852 | 2 | 8 |
| 9 | 65 | (Germany) Philipp Öttl | KTM | 12 | +6.594 | 15 | 7 |
| 10 | 40 | (South Africa) Darryn Binder | KTM | 12 | +12.709 | 11 | 6 |
| 11 | 19 | (Argentina) Gabriel Rodrigo | KTM | 12 | +13.240 | 14 | 5 |
| 12 | 16 | (Italy) Andrea Migno | KTM | 12 | +13.285 | 19 | 4 |
| 13 | 95 | (France) Jules Danilo | Honda | 12 | +13.290 | 21 | 3 |
| 14 | 23 | (Italy) Niccolò Antonelli | KTM | 12 | +13.412 | 8 | 2 |
| 15 | 11 | (Belgium) Livio Loi | Honda | 12 | +13.491 | 16 | 1 |
| 16 | 42 | (Spain) Marcos Ramírez | KTM | 12 | +23.922 | 20 | |
| 17 | 12 | (Italy) Marco Bezzecchi | Mahindra | 12 | +24.347 | 26 | |
| 18 | 71 | (Japan) Ayumu Sasaki | Honda | 12 | +24.650 | 17 | |
| 19 | 7 | (Malaysia) Adam Norrodin | Honda | 12 | +24.795 | 25 | |
| 20 | 14 | (Italy) Tony Arbolino | Honda | 12 | +25.166 | 24 | |
| 21 | 75 | (Spain) Albert Arenas | Mahindra | 12 | +26.811 | 22 | |
| 22 | 6 | (Spain) María Herrera | KTM | 12 | +27.431 | 24 | |
| 23 | 84 | (Czech Republic) Jakub Kornfeil | Peugeot | 12 | +37.960 | 23 | |
| 24 | 41 | (Thailand) Nakarin Atiratphuvapat | Honda | 12 | +41.408 | 32 | |
| 25 | 96 | (Italy) Manuel Pagliani | Mahindra | 12 | +43.789 | 29 | |
| 26 | 48 | (Italy) Lorenzo Dalla Porta | Mahindra | 12 | +44.004 | 28 | |
| 27 | 4 | (Finland) Patrik Pulkkinen | Peugeot | 12 | +51.071 | 30 | |
| 28 | 18 | (Mexico) Gabriel Martínez-Ábrego | KTM | 12 | +51.438 | 31 | |
| Ret | 24 | (Japan) Tatsuki Suzuki | Honda | 9 | Out Of Fuel | 18 | |
| Ret | 44 | (Spain) Arón Canet | Honda | 3 | Accident | 1 | |
| Ret | 27 | (Japan) Kaito Toba | Honda | 3 | Accident | 27 | |
| DNS | 64 | (Netherlands) Bo Bendsneyder | KTM | 0 | Did not start | 10 | |
OFFICIAL MOTO3 REPORT

== Championship standings after the race ==
=== MotoGP ===
Below are the standings for the top five riders and constructors after round three has concluded.

Riders' Championship standings

| Pos. | Rider | Points |
|---|---|---|
| 1 | (Italy) Valentino Rossi | 56 |
| 2 | (Spain) Maverick Viñales | 50 |
| 3 | (Spain) Marc Márquez | 38 |
| 4 | (Italy) Andrea Dovizioso | 30 |
| 5 | (United Kingdom) Cal Crutchlow | 29 |

Constructors' Championship standings

| Pos. | Constructor | Points |
|---|---|---|
| 1 | (Japan) Yamaha | 70 |
| 2 | (Japan) Honda | 54 |
| 3 | (Italy) Ducati | 43 |
| 4 | (Japan) Suzuki | 16 |
| 5 | (Italy) Aprilia | 10 |

- Note: Only the top five positions are included for both sets of standings.

=== Moto2 ===
| Pos. | Rider | Points |
|---|---|---|
| 1 | (Italy) Franco Morbidelli | 75 |
| 2 | (Switzerland) Thomas Lüthi | 56 |
| 3 | (Portugal) Miguel Oliveira | 43 |
| 4 | (Japan) Takaaki Nakagami | 32 |
| 5 | (Spain) Xavi Vierge | 25 |
| 6 | (Spain) Álex Márquez | 24 |
| 7 | (Italy) Lorenzo Baldassarri | 21 |
| 8 | (Italy) Luca Marini | 20 |
| 9 | (Italy) Simone Corsi | 19 |
| 10 | (Switzerland) Dominique Aegerter | 18 |

=== Moto3 ===
| Pos. | Rider | Points |
|---|---|---|
| 1 | (Spain) Joan Mir | 58 |
| 2 | (Spain) Jorge Martín | 52 |
| 3 | (United Kingdom) John McPhee | 49 |
| 4 | (Italy) Romano Fenati | 45 |
| 5 | (Italy) Andrea Migno | 25 |
| 6 | (Italy) Fabio Di Giannantonio | 24 |
| 7 | (Germany) Philipp Öttl | 20 |
| 8 | (Spain) Arón Canet | 18 |
| 9 | (Spain) Juan Francisco Guevara | 17 |
| 10 | (Belgium) Livio Loi | 15 |

== Notes ==
| Previous race: 2017 Argentine Grand Prix | FIM Grand Prix World Championship; 2017 season | Next race: 2017 Spanish Grand Prix |
| Previous race: 2016 Grand Prix of the Americas | Motorcycle Grand Prix of the Americas | Next race: 2018 Grand Prix of the Americas |
