= 2017 Austrian motorcycle Grand Prix =

(Austria) 2017 Austrian Grand Prix
Race details
- Race 11 of 18 races in the 2017 Grand Prix motorcycle racing season
- Date: August 13 2017
- Official name: NeroGiardini Motorrad Grand Prix von Österreich
- Location: Red Bull Ring
- Course: Permanent racing facility; 4.318 km (2.683 mi)

MotoGP
Pole position
Rider	(Spain) Marc Márquez	Honda
Time	1:23.235	
Fastest lap
Rider	(France) Johann Zarco	Yamaha
Time	1:24.312 on lap 6	
Podium
First	(Italy) Andrea Dovizioso	Ducati
Second	(Spain) Marc Márquez	Honda
Third	(Spain) Dani Pedrosa	Honda

Moto2
Pole position
Rider	(Italy) Mattia Pasini	Kalex
Time	1:29.394	
Fastest lap
Rider	(Spain) Álex Márquez	Kalex
Time	1:29.715 on lap 22	
Podium
First	(Italy) Franco Morbidelli	Kalex
Second	(Spain) Álex Márquez	Kalex
Third	(Switzerland) Thomas Lüthi	Kalex

Moto3
Pole position
Rider	(Argentina) Gabriel Rodrigo	KTM
Time	1:36.503	
Fastest lap
Rider	(Spain) Jaume Masiá	KTM
Time	1:36.436 on lap 11	
Podium
First	(Spain) Joan Mir	Honda
Second	(Germany) Philipp Öttl	KTM
Third	(Spain) Jorge Martín	Honda

The 2017 Austrian motorcycle Grand Prix was the eleventh round of the 2017 MotoGP season. It was held at the Red Bull Ring in Spielberg on August 13, 2017.

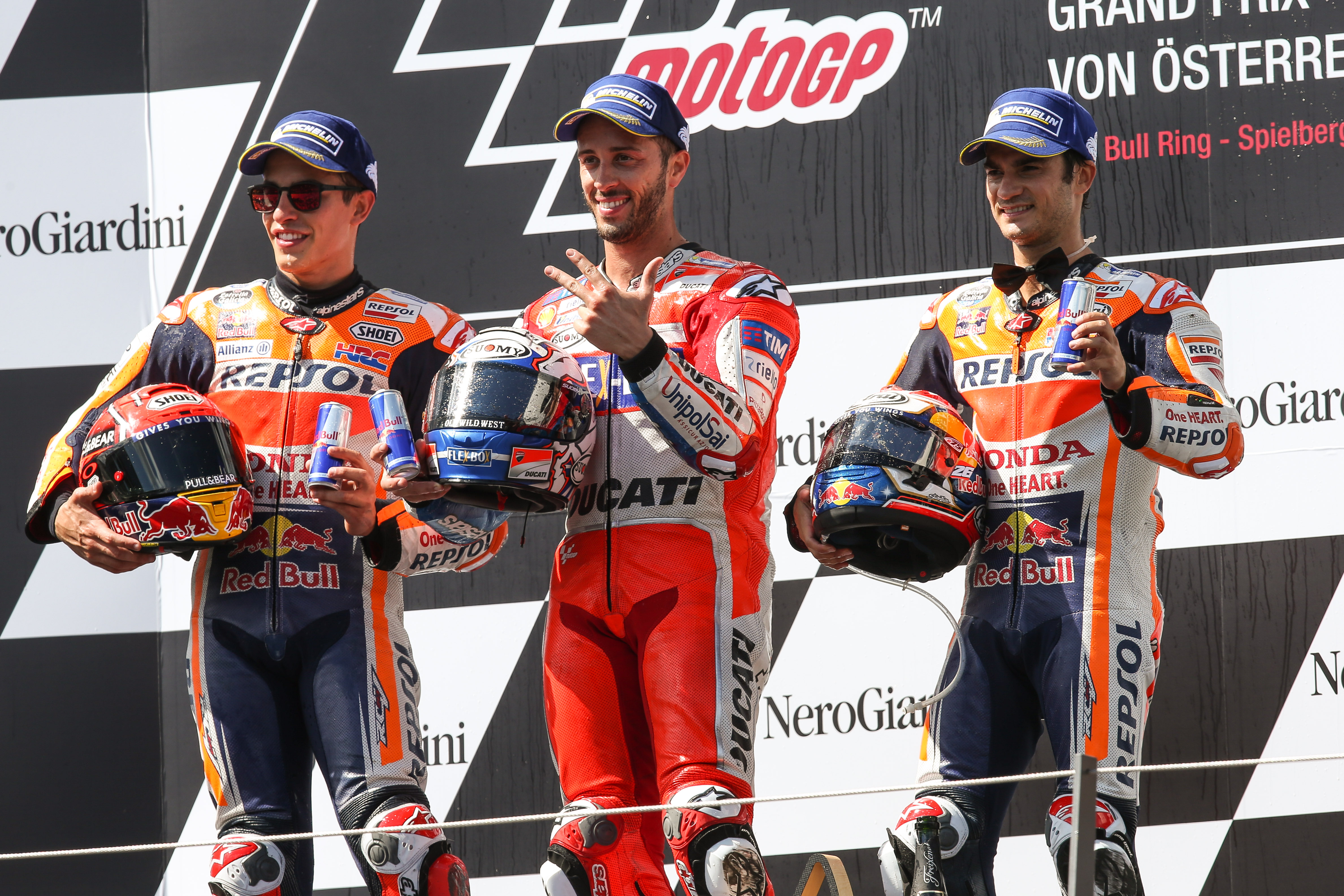
Marc Márquez, Andrea Dovizioso and Dani Pedrosa on the podium after finishing second, first and third in the MotoGP race.

== Classification ==
=== MotoGP ===
Pos.	No.	Rider	Team	Manufacturer	Laps	Time/Retired	Grid	Points
1	4	(Italy) Andrea Dovizioso	Ducati Team	Ducati	28	39:43.323	2	25
2	93	(Spain) Marc Márquez	Repsol Honda Team	Honda	28	+0.176	1	20
3	26	(Spain) Dani Pedrosa	Repsol Honda Team	Honda	28	+2.661	8	16
4	99	(Spain) Jorge Lorenzo	Ducati Team	Ducati	28	+6.663	3	13
5	5	(France) Johann Zarco	Monster Yamaha Tech 3	Yamaha	28	+7.262	6	11
6	25	(Spain) Maverick Viñales	Movistar Yamaha MotoGP	Yamaha	28	+7.447	4	10
7	46	(Italy) Valentino Rossi	Movistar Yamaha MotoGP	Yamaha	28	+8.995	7	9
8	19	(Spain) Álvaro Bautista	Pull&Bear Aspar Team	Ducati	28	+14.515	17	8
9	76	(France) Loris Baz	Reale Avintia Racing	Ducati	28	+19.620	12	7
10	36	(Finland) Mika Kallio	Red Bull KTM Factory Racing	KTM	28	+19.766	18	6
11	29	(Italy) Andrea Iannone	Team Suzuki Ecstar	Suzuki	28	+20.101	10	5
12	45	(United Kingdom) Scott Redding	Octo Pramac Racing	Ducati	28	+25.523	15	4
13	41	(Spain) Aleix Espargaró	Aprilia Racing Team Gresini	Aprilia	28	+26.700	20	3
14	17	(Czech Republic) Karel Abraham	Pull&Bear Aspar Team	Ducati	28	+27.321	11	2
15	35	(United Kingdom) Cal Crutchlow	LCR Honda	Honda	28	+28.096	9	1
16	42	(Spain) Álex Rins	Team Suzuki Ecstar	Suzuki	28	+32.912	21	
17	8	(Spain) Héctor Barberá	Reale Avintia Racing	Ducati	28	+34.112	14	
18	38	(United Kingdom) Bradley Smith	Red Bull KTM Factory Racing	KTM	28	+36.423	22	
19	53	(Spain) Tito Rabat	EG 0,0 Marc VDS	Honda	28	+42.404	24	
20	22	(United Kingdom) Sam Lowes	Aprilia Racing Team Gresini	Aprilia	28	+52.492	23	
Ret	43	(Australia) Jack Miller	EG 0,0 Marc VDS	Honda	19	Accident	19	
Ret	9	(Italy) Danilo Petrucci	Octo Pramac Racing	Ducati	6	Mechanical	5	
Ret	94	(Germany) Jonas Folger	Monster Yamaha Tech 3	Yamaha	3	Brakes	13	
Ret	44	(Spain) Pol Espargaró	Red Bull KTM Factory Racing	KTM	2	Brake Sensor	16	

=== Moto2 ===
Pos.	No.	Rider	Manufacturer	Laps	Time/Retired	Grid	Points
1	21	(Italy) Franco Morbidelli	Kalex	25	37:39.370	2	25
2	73	(Spain) Álex Márquez	Kalex	25	+1.312	3	20
3	12	(Switzerland) Thomas Lüthi	Kalex	25	+2.544	5	16
4	42	(Italy) Francesco Bagnaia	Kalex	25	+3.070	4	13
5	54	(Italy) Mattia Pasini	Kalex	25	+3.745	1	11
6	30	(Japan) Takaaki Nakagami	Kalex	25	+8.827	12	10
7	41	(South Africa) Brad Binder	KTM	25	+9.018	17	9
8	9	(Spain) Jorge Navarro	Kalex	25	+13.692	11	8
9	77	(Switzerland) Dominique Aegerter	Suter	25	+14.955	13	7
10	55	(Malaysia) Hafizh Syahrin	Kalex	25	+18.997	21	6
11	24	(Italy) Simone Corsi	Speed Up	25	+21.887	14	5
12	45	(Japan) Tetsuta Nagashima	Kalex	25	+22.028	20	4
13	49	(Spain) Axel Pons	Kalex	25	+23.008	18	3
14	57	(Spain) Edgar Pons	Kalex	25	+23.290	23	2
15	87	(Australia) Remy Gardner	Tech 3	25	+25.128	25	1
16	37	(Spain) Augusto Fernández	Speed Up	25	+33.460	27	
17	89	(Malaysia) Khairul Idham Pawi	Kalex	25	+33.931	31	
18	2	(Switzerland) Jesko Raffin	Kalex	25	+40.110	30	
19	20	(United States) Joe Roberts	Kalex	25	+43.888	28	
20	6	(United Kingdom) Tarran Mackenzie	Suter	25	+46.097	29	
21	27	(Spain) Iker Lecuona	Kalex	23	+2 laps	19	
Ret	44	(Portugal) Miguel Oliveira	KTM	20	Accident	8	
Ret	62	(Italy) Stefano Manzi	Kalex	13	Accident Damage	26	
Ret	5	(Italy) Andrea Locatelli	Kalex	12	Accident Damage	22	
Ret	32	(Spain) Isaac Viñales	Kalex	11	Accident	7	
Ret	97	(Spain) Xavi Vierge	Tech 3	1	Accident Damage	9	
Ret	19	(Belgium) Xavier Siméon	Kalex	1	Accident Damage	24	
Ret	40	(France) Fabio Quartararo	Kalex	0	Collision	6	
Ret	11	(Germany) Sandro Cortese	Suter	0	Collision	10	
Ret	7	(Italy) Lorenzo Baldassarri	Kalex	0	Collision	15	
Ret	10	(Italy) Luca Marini	Kalex	0	Collision	16	
DNS	52	(United Kingdom) Danny Kent	Suter		Did not start		
OFFICIAL MOTO2 REPORT

=== Moto3 ===
Pos.	No.	Rider	Manufacturer	Laps	Time/Retired	Grid	Points
1	36	(Spain) Joan Mir	Honda	23	37:23.124	10	25
2	65	(Germany) Philipp Öttl	KTM	23	+3.045	8	20
3	88	(Spain) Jorge Martín	Honda	23	+3.377	13	16
4	11	(Belgium) Livio Loi	Honda	23	+3.385	12	13
5	44	(Spain) Arón Canet	Honda	23	+3.502	3	11
6	21	(Italy) Fabio Di Giannantonio	Honda	23	+3.730	9	10
7	19	(Argentina) Gabriel Rodrigo	KTM	23	+3.804	1	9
8	7	(Malaysia) Adam Norrodin	Honda	23	+4.183	15	8
9	15	(Spain) Jaume Masiá	KTM	23	+4.310	14	7
10	33	(Italy) Enea Bastianini	Honda	23	+4.858	4	6
11	8	(Italy) Nicolò Bulega	KTM	23	+4.887	16	5
12	42	(Spain) Marcos Ramírez	KTM	23	+5.054	23	4
13	5	(Italy) Romano Fenati	Honda	23	+5.080	11	3
14	58	(Spain) Juan Francisco Guevara	KTM	23	+7.015	2	2
15	27	(Japan) Kaito Toba	Honda	23	+16.246	27	1
16	95	(France) Jules Danilo	Honda	23	+16.447	21	
17	14	(Italy) Tony Arbolino	Honda	23	+16.449	24	
18	71	(Japan) Ayumu Sasaki	Honda	23	+16.653	18	
19	96	(Italy) Manuel Pagliani	Mahindra	23	+16.673	30	
20	84	(Czech Republic) Jakub Kornfeil	Peugeot	23	+17.077	28	
21	16	(Italy) Andrea Migno	KTM	23	+34.984	7	
22	6	(Spain) María Herrera	KTM	23	+43.607	29	
23	13	(Austria) Maximilian Kofler	KTM	23	+57.874	31	
24	4	(Finland) Patrik Pulkkinen	Peugeot	23	+57.982	32	
Ret	12	(Italy) Marco Bezzecchi	Mahindra	22	Collision	25	
Ret	75	(Spain) Albert Arenas	Mahindra	22	Collision	20	
Ret	41	(Thailand) Nakarin Atiratphuvapat	Honda	22	Collision	22	
Ret	17	(United Kingdom) John McPhee	Honda	16	Collision Damage	5	
Ret	64	(Netherlands) Bo Bendsneyder	KTM	15	Collision	6	
Ret	23	(Italy) Niccolò Antonelli	KTM	14	Accident	17	
Ret	24	(Japan) Tatsuki Suzuki	Honda	14	Accident	26	
Ret	48	(Italy) Lorenzo Dalla Porta	Mahindra	2	Accident	19	
Ret	18	(Mexico) Gabriel Martínez-Ábrego	KTM	2	Accident	33	
OFFICIAL MOTO3 REPORT

== Championship standings after the race ==
=== MotoGP ===
Below are the standings for the top five riders and constructors after round eleven has concluded.

Riders' Championship standings

Pos.	Rider	Points
1	(Spain) Marc Márquez	174
2	(Italy) Andrea Dovizioso	158
3	(Spain) Maverick Viñales	150
4	(Italy) Valentino Rossi	141
5	(Spain) Dani Pedrosa	139

Constructors' Championship standings

Pos.	Constructor	Points
1	(Japan) Yamaha	211
2	(Japan) Honda	211
3	(Italy) Ducati	187
4	(Italy) Aprilia	45
5	(Japan) Suzuki	45

- Note: Only the top five positions are included for both sets of standings.

=== Moto2 ===
Pos.	Rider	Points
1	(Italy) Franco Morbidelli	207
2	(Switzerland) Thomas Lüthi	181
3	(Spain) Álex Márquez	153
4	(Portugal) Miguel Oliveira	133
5	(Italy) Francesco Bagnaia	100
6	(Italy) Mattia Pasini	84
7	(Japan) Takaaki Nakagami	79
8	(Italy) Simone Corsi	68
9	(Switzerland) Dominique Aegerter	57
10	(Italy) Luca Marini	54

=== Moto3 ===
Pos.	Rider	Points
1	(Spain) Joan Mir	215
2	(Italy) Romano Fenati	151
3	(Spain) Arón Canet	137
4	(Spain) Jorge Martín	105
5	(Italy) Fabio Di Giannantonio	95
6	(United Kingdom) John McPhee	93
7	(Spain) Marcos Ramírez	92
8	(Italy) Andrea Migno	83
9	(Spain) Juan Francisco Guevara	71
10	(Italy) Enea Bastianini	65

Previous race: 2017 Czech Republic Grand Prix	FIM Grand Prix World Championship; 2017 season	Next race: 2017 British Grand Prix
Previous race: 2016 Austrian Grand Prix	Austrian motorcycle Grand Prix	Next race: 2018 Austrian Grand Prix
