= 2017 Czech Republic motorcycle Grand Prix =

2017 Czech Republic Grand Prix
Race details
- Race 10 of 18 races in the 2017 Grand Prix motorcycle racing season
- Date: August 6, 2017
- Official name: Monster Energy Grand Prix České republiky
- Location: Brno Circuit
- Course: Permanent racing facility; 5.403 km (3.357 mi)

MotoGP
Pole position
Rider	(Spain) Marc Márquez	Honda
Time	1:54.981	
Fastest lap
Rider	(Spain) Maverick Viñales	Yamaha
Time	1:57.052 on lap 17	
Podium
First	(Spain) Marc Márquez	Honda
Second	(Spain) Dani Pedrosa	Honda
Third	(Spain) Maverick Viñales	Yamaha

Moto2
Pole position
Rider	(Italy) Mattia Pasini	Kalex
Time	2:02.611	
Fastest lap
Rider	(Italy) Franco Morbidelli	Kalex
Time	2:03.194 on lap 6 (first part)	
Podium
First	(Switzerland) Thomas Lüthi	Kalex
Second	(Spain) Álex Márquez	Kalex
Third	(Portugal) Miguel Oliveira	KTM

Moto3
Pole position
Rider	(Argentina) Gabriel Rodrigo	KTM
Time	2:08.571	
Fastest lap
Rider	(Spain) Joan Mir	Honda
Time	2:16.520 on lap 19	
Podium
First	(Spain) Joan Mir	Honda
Second	(Italy) Romano Fenati	Honda
Third	(Spain) Arón Canet	Honda

The 2017 Czech Republic motorcycle Grand Prix was the tenth round of the 2017 MotoGP season. It was held at the Brno Circuit in Brno on August 6, 2017.

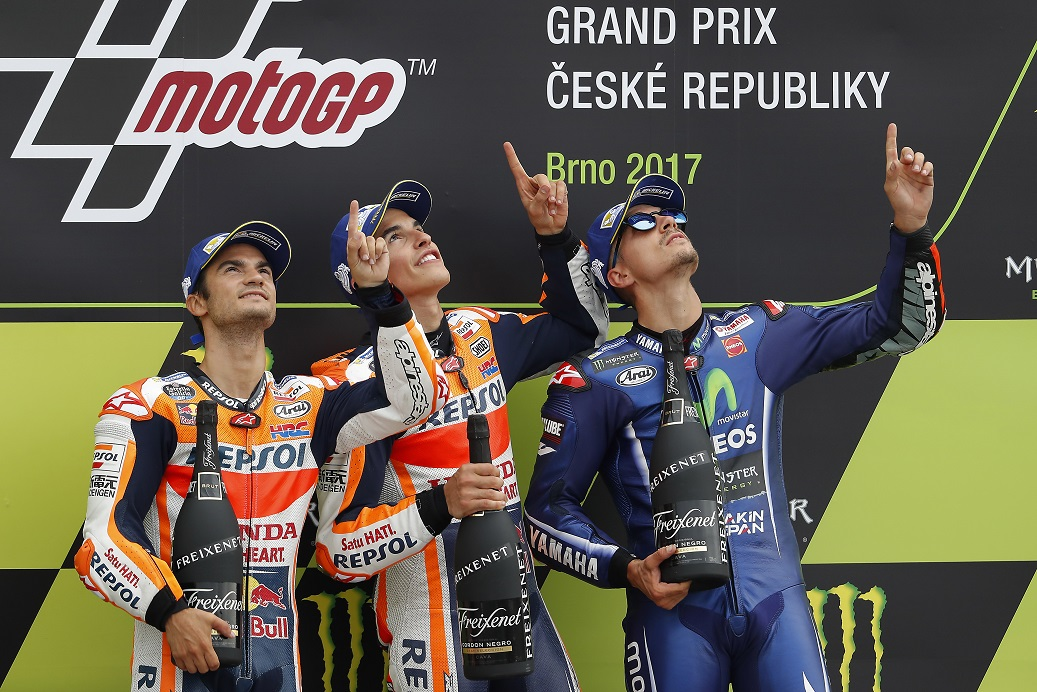
Dani Pedrosa, Marc Márquez and Maverick Viñales, celebrating on the podium after finishing second, first and third at the MotoGP race.

== Classification ==
=== MotoGP ===
Pos.	No.	Rider	Team	Manufacturer	Laps	Time/Retired	Grid	Points
1	93	(Spain) Marc Márquez	Repsol Honda Team	Honda	22	44:15.974	1	25
2	26	(Spain) Dani Pedrosa	Repsol Honda Team	Honda	22	+12.438	3	20
3	25	(Spain) Maverick Viñales	Movistar Yamaha MotoGP	Yamaha	22	+18.135	7	16
4	46	(Italy) Valentino Rossi	Movistar Yamaha MotoGP	Yamaha	22	+20.466	2	13
5	35	(United Kingdom) Cal Crutchlow	LCR Honda	Honda	22	+20.892	5	11
6	4	(Italy) Andrea Dovizioso	Ducati Team	Ducati	22	+23.259	4	10
7	9	(Italy) Danilo Petrucci	Octo Pramac Racing	Ducati	22	+24.079	8	9
8	41	(Spain) Aleix Espargaró	Aprilia Racing Team Gresini	Aprilia	22	+30.559	11	8
9	44	(Spain) Pol Espargaró	Red Bull KTM Factory Racing	KTM	22	+30.754	18	7
10	94	(Germany) Jonas Folger	Monster Yamaha Tech 3	Yamaha	22	+33.236	14	6
11	42	(Spain) Álex Rins	Team Suzuki Ecstar	Suzuki	22	+33.290	13	5
12	5	(France) Johann Zarco	Monster Yamaha Tech 3	Yamaha	22	+34.595	10	4
13	17	(Czech Republic) Karel Abraham	Pull&Bear Aspar Team	Ducati	22	+34.697	17	3
14	43	(Australia) Jack Miller	EG 0,0 Marc VDS	Honda	22	+38.062	15	2
15	99	(Spain) Jorge Lorenzo	Ducati Team	Ducati	22	+40.100	6	1
16	45	(United Kingdom) Scott Redding	Octo Pramac Racing	Ducati	22	+44.376	23	
17	53	(Spain) Tito Rabat	EG 0,0 Marc VDS	Honda	22	+45.454	21	
18	22	(United Kingdom) Sam Lowes	Aprilia Racing Team Gresini	Aprilia	22	+53.976	22	
19	29	(Italy) Andrea Iannone	Team Suzuki Ecstar	Suzuki	22	+1:23.346	20	
20	8	(Spain) Héctor Barberá	Reale Avintia Racing	Ducati	21	+1 lap	16	
Ret	38	(United Kingdom) Bradley Smith	Red Bull KTM Factory Racing	KTM	20	Retired	19	
Ret	76	(France) Loris Baz	Reale Avintia Racing	Ducati	15	Accident	12	
Ret	19	(Spain) Álvaro Bautista	Pull&Bear Aspar Team	Ducati	12	Accident	9	

=== Moto2 ===
The race, scheduled to be run for 20 laps, was red-flagged on lap 8 due to changing track conditions. The race was later restarted over 6 laps.

Pos.	No.	Rider	Manufacturer	Laps	Time/Retired	Grid	Points
1	12	(Switzerland) Thomas Lüthi	Kalex	6	13:39.036	11	25
2	73	(Spain) Álex Márquez	Kalex	6	+4.991	6	20
3	44	(Portugal) Miguel Oliveira	KTM	6	+6.983	2	16
4	10	(Italy) Luca Marini	Kalex	6	+9.190	7	13
5	97	(Spain) Xavi Vierge	Tech 3	6	+11.064	18	11
6	24	(Italy) Simone Corsi	Speed Up	6	+15.779	12 (Note: 3-place grid penalty.)	10
7	42	(Italy) Francesco Bagnaia	Kalex	6	+18.431	4	9
8	21	(Italy) Franco Morbidelli	Kalex	6	+19.743	3	8
9	87	(Australia) Remy Gardner	Tech 3	6	+19.843	26	7
10	20	(United States) Joe Roberts	Kalex	6	+20.168	31	6
11	9	(Spain) Jorge Navarro	Kalex	6	+20.372	5	5
12	41	(South Africa) Brad Binder	KTM	6	+20.547	9	4
13	5	(Italy) Andrea Locatelli	Kalex	6	+21.657	20	3
14	89	(Malaysia) Khairul Idham Pawi	Kalex	6	+22.940	13	2
15	55	(Malaysia) Hafizh Syahrin	Kalex	6	+24.056	16	1
16	49	(Spain) Axel Pons	Kalex	6	+24.192	14	
17	45	(Japan) Tetsuta Nagashima	Kalex	6	+24.441	23	
18	7	(Italy) Lorenzo Baldassarri	Kalex	6	+25.607	19	
19	27	(Spain) Iker Lecuona	Kalex	6	+26.483	22	
20	40	(France) Fabio Quartararo	Kalex	6	+26.769	10	
21	62	(Italy) Stefano Manzi	Kalex	6	+28.069	24	
22	98	(Czech Republic) Karel Hanika	Kalex	6	+28.167	32	
23	19	(Belgium) Xavier Siméon	Kalex	6	+28.304	25	
24	30	(Japan) Takaaki Nakagami	Kalex	6	+29.463	15	
25	32	(Spain) Isaac Viñales	Kalex	6	+29.795	17	
26	6	(United Kingdom) Tarran Mackenzie	Suter	6	+30.353	28	
27	37	(Spain) Augusto Fernández	Speed Up	6	+30.555	27	
28	57	(Spain) Edgar Pons	Kalex	6	+30.815	30	
29	2	(Switzerland) Jesko Raffin	Kalex	6	+38.907	29	
Ret	54	(Italy) Mattia Pasini	Kalex	0	Accident	1	
DNS	11	(Germany) Sandro Cortese	Suter	0	Did not restart	8	
DNS	77	(Switzerland) Dominique Aegerter	Suter	0	Did not restart	21	
DNS	23	(Germany) Marcel Schrötter	Suter		Did not start		
OFFICIAL MOTO2 REPORT

=== Moto3 ===
Pos.	No.	Rider	Manufacturer	Laps	Time/Retired	Grid	Points
1	36	(Spain) Joan Mir	Honda	19	44:41.314	4	25
2	5	(Italy) Romano Fenati	Honda	19	+0.350	2	20
3	44	(Spain) Arón Canet	Honda	19	+3.078	17	16
4	64	(Netherlands) Bo Bendsneyder	KTM	19	+4.598	6	13
5	58	(Spain) Juan Francisco Guevara	KTM	19	+4.882	3	11
6	17	(United Kingdom) John McPhee	Honda	19	+8.343	19	10
7	42	(Spain) Marcos Ramírez	KTM	19	+9.597	7	9
8	24	(Japan) Tatsuki Suzuki	Honda	19	+10.234	13	8
9	7	(Malaysia) Adam Norrodin	Honda	19	+10.395	24	7
10	41	(Thailand) Nakarin Atiratphuvapat	Honda	19	+10.913	15	6
11	16	(Italy) Andrea Migno	KTM	19	+11.148	14	5
12	75	(Spain) Albert Arenas	Mahindra	19	+12.085	32 (Note: 12-place grid penalty.)	4
13	65	(Germany) Philipp Öttl	KTM	19	+14.266	10	3
14	10	(Italy) Dennis Foggia	KTM	19	+14.271	25	2
15	71	(Japan) Ayumu Sasaki	Honda	19	+14.311	11	1
16	14	(Italy) Tony Arbolino	Honda	19	+14.404	16	
17	33	(Italy) Enea Bastianini	Honda	19	+14.449	31	
18	77	(Germany) Tim Georgi	KTM	19	+15.144	28	
19	48	(Italy) Lorenzo Dalla Porta	Mahindra	19	+20.312	21	
20	84	(Czech Republic) Jakub Kornfeil	Peugeot	19	+23.680	23	
21	21	(Italy) Fabio Di Giannantonio	Honda	19	+23.935	8	
22	12	(Italy) Marco Bezzecchi	Mahindra	19	+24.772	27	
23	8	(Italy) Nicolò Bulega	KTM	19	+24.831	5	
24	23	(Italy) Niccolò Antonelli	KTM	19	+25.143	12	
25	96	(Italy) Manuel Pagliani	Mahindra	19	+38.836	26	
26	19	(Argentina) Gabriel Rodrigo	KTM	19	+42.433	1	
27	11	(Belgium) Livio Loi	Honda	19	+42.497	9	
28	18	(Mexico) Gabriel Martínez-Ábrego	KTM	19	+47.923	30	
29	27	(Japan) Kaito Toba	Honda	19	+48.013	22	
30	4	(Finland) Patrik Pulkkinen	Peugeot	19	+48.407	29	
Ret	95	(France) Jules Danilo	Honda	0	Collision	18	
Ret	6	(Spain) María Herrera	KTM	0	Collision	20	
DNS	88	(Spain) Jorge Martín	Honda		Did not start		
OFFICIAL MOTO3 REPORT

== Championship standings after the race ==
=== MotoGP ===
Below are the standings for the top five riders and constructors after round ten has concluded.

Riders' Championship standings

Pos.	Rider	Points
1	(Spain) Marc Márquez	154
2	(Spain) Maverick Viñales	140
3	(Italy) Andrea Dovizioso	133
4	(Italy) Valentino Rossi	132
5	(Spain) Dani Pedrosa	123

Constructors' Championship standings

Pos.	Constructor	Points
1	(Japan) Yamaha	200
2	(Japan) Honda	191
3	(Italy) Ducati	162
4	(Italy) Aprilia	42
5	(Japan) Suzuki	40

- Note: Only the top five positions are included for both sets of standings.

=== Moto2 ===
Pos.	Rider	Points
1	(Italy) Franco Morbidelli	182
2	(Switzerland) Thomas Lüthi	165
3	(Spain) Álex Márquez	133
4	(Portugal) Miguel Oliveira	133
5	(Italy) Francesco Bagnaia	87
6	(Italy) Mattia Pasini	73
7	(Japan) Takaaki Nakagami	69
8	(Italy) Simone Corsi	63
9	(Italy) Luca Marini	54
10	(Spain) Xavi Vierge	51

=== Moto3 ===
Pos.	Rider	Points
1	(Spain) Joan Mir	190
2	(Italy) Romano Fenati	148
3	(Spain) Arón Canet	126
4	(United Kingdom) John McPhee	93
5	(Spain) Jorge Martín	89
6	(Spain) Marcos Ramírez	88
7	(Italy) Fabio Di Giannantonio	85
8	(Italy) Andrea Migno	83
9	(Spain) Juan Francisco Guevara	69
10	(Italy) Enea Bastianini	59

== Notes ==
Previous race: 2017 German Grand Prix	FIM Grand Prix World Championship; 2017 season	Next race: 2017 Austrian Grand Prix
Previous race: 2016 Czech Republic Grand Prix	Czech Republic motorcycle Grand Prix	Next race: 2018 Czech Republic Grand Prix
