= 2019 Moto2 World Championship =

10th running of the Moto2 World Championship

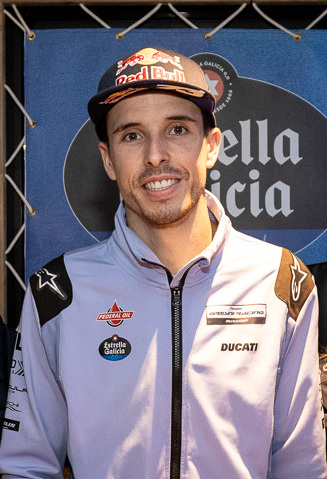
Álex Márquez (pictured in 2023) was the 2019 Moto2 World Riders' Champion.

The 2019 FIM Moto2 World Championship was the intermediate class of the 71st Fédération Internationale de Motocyclisme (FIM) Road Racing World Championship season. Francesco Bagnaia was the reigning series champion but he was unable to defend his title as he joined the series' premier class, MotoGP.

Álex Márquez became the Moto2 World Champion of 2019 seeing for the second time both Márquez brothers claiming championships in the same year in their respective classes with Marc Márquez winning his 6th premier class title. Despite finishing the final race in Valencia outside the points, Márquez secured his title with over ten podium finishes with five of them in 1st place securing his championship ahead of Brad Binder by three points.

== Teams and riders ==
| Team | Constructor | Motorcycle | No. | Rider | Rounds |
|---|---|---|---|---|---|
| (Germany) Dynavolt Intact GP | Kalex | Moto2 | 12 | (Switzerland) Thomas Lüthi | All |
| (Germany) Dynavolt Intact GP | Kalex | Moto2 | 23 | (Germany) Marcel Schrötter | 1–13, 15–19 |
| (Germany) Dynavolt Intact GP | Kalex | Moto2 | 2 | (Switzerland) Jesko Raffin | 14 |
| (Belgium) EG 0,0 Marc VDS | Kalex | Moto2 | 73 | (Spain) Álex Márquez | All |
| (Belgium) EG 0,0 Marc VDS | Kalex | Moto2 | 97 | (Spain) Xavi Vierge | All |
| (Italy) Federal Oil Gresini Moto2 | Kalex | Moto2 | 22 | (United Kingdom) Sam Lowes | All |
| (Spain) Flexbox HP40 | Kalex | Moto2 | 7 | (Italy) Lorenzo Baldassarri | All |
| (Spain) Flexbox HP40 | Kalex | Moto2 | 40 | (Spain) Augusto Fernández | 1–2, 4–19 |
| (Spain) Flexbox HP40 | Kalex | Moto2 | 54 | (Italy) Mattia Pasini | 3 |
| (Japan) Idemitsu Honda Team Asia | Kalex | Moto2 | 20 | (Indonesia) Dimas Ekky Pratama | 1–10, 15–19 |
| (Japan) Idemitsu Honda Team Asia | Kalex | Moto2 | 19 | (Japan) Teppei Nagoe | 11–12 |
| (Japan) Idemitsu Honda Team Asia | Kalex | Moto2 | 36 | (Indonesia) Andi Farid Izdihar | 13 |
| (Japan) Idemitsu Honda Team Asia | Kalex | Moto2 | 31 | (Indonesia) Gerry Salim | 14 |
| (Japan) Idemitsu Honda Team Asia | Kalex | Moto2 | 35 | (Thailand) Somkiat Chantra | 1–5, 7–8, 10–19 |
| (Japan) Idemitsu Honda Team Asia | Kalex | Moto2 | 19 | (Japan) Teppei Nagoe | 6 |
| (Italy) Italtrans Racing Team | Kalex | Moto2 | 5 | (Italy) Andrea Locatelli | All |
| (Italy) Italtrans Racing Team | Kalex | Moto2 | 33 | (Italy) Enea Bastianini | All |
| (Spain) Onexox TKKR SAG Team | Kalex | Moto2 | 45 | (Japan) Tetsuta Nagashima | All |
| (Spain) Onexox TKKR SAG Team | Kalex | Moto2 | 87 | (Australia) Remy Gardner | All |
| (Malaysia) Petronas Sprinta Racing | Kalex | Moto2 | 89 | (Malaysia) Khairul Idham Pawi | 1–4, 10 (Note: Khairul Idham Pawi competed in the first Friday practice session during round 10, before being replaced by Jonas Folger.) |
| (Malaysia) Petronas Sprinta Racing | Kalex | Moto2 | 54 | (Italy) Mattia Pasini | 5–6 |
| (Malaysia) Petronas Sprinta Racing | Kalex | Moto2 | 94 | (Germany) Jonas Folger | 7–11 |
| (Malaysia) Petronas Sprinta Racing | Kalex | Moto2 | 38 | (United Kingdom) Bradley Smith | 12 |
| (Malaysia) Petronas Sprinta Racing | Kalex | Moto2 | 47 | (Malaysia) Adam Norrodin | 13–19 |
| (Italy) Sky Racing Team VR46 | Kalex | Moto2 | 10 | (Italy) Luca Marini | All |
| (Italy) Sky Racing Team VR46 | Kalex | Moto2 | 11 | (Italy) Nicolò Bulega | 1–2, 4–19 |
| (Italy) Tasca Racing Scuderia Moto2 | Kalex | Moto2 | 24 | (Italy) Simone Corsi | 1–9 |
| (Italy) Tasca Racing Scuderia Moto2 | Kalex | Moto2 | 54 | (Italy) Mattia Pasini | 10–13, 15–19 |
| (Italy) Tasca Racing Scuderia Moto2 | Kalex | Moto2 | 6 | (Italy) Gabriele Ruiu | 14 |
| (United States) American Racing KTM (United States) monday.com American Racing | KTM | Moto2 | 16 | (United States) Joe Roberts | All |
| (United States) American Racing KTM (United States) monday.com American Racing | KTM | Moto2 | 27 | (Spain) Iker Lecuona | 1–18 |
| (United States) American Racing KTM (United States) monday.com American Racing | KTM | Moto2 | 69 | (United States) Sean Dylan Kelly | 19 |
| (Germany) Kiefer Racing | KTM | Moto2 | 3 | (Germany) Lukas Tulovic | All |
| (Finland) Red Bull KTM Ajo | KTM | Moto2 | 41 | (South Africa) Brad Binder | All |
| (Finland) Red Bull KTM Ajo | KTM | Moto2 | 88 | (Spain) Jorge Martín | All |
| (France) Red Bull KTM Tech3 | KTM | Moto2 | 65 | (Germany) Philipp Öttl | 1–8, 10–19 |
| (France) Red Bull KTM Tech3 | KTM | Moto2 | 72 | (Italy) Marco Bezzecchi | All |
| (Spain) Sama Qatar Ángel Nieto Team (Spain) Gaviota Ángel Nieto Team (Spain) Inde Ángel Nieto Team | KTM | Moto2 | 18 | (Andorra) Xavier Cardelús | All |
| (Spain) Sama Qatar Ángel Nieto Team (Spain) Gaviota Ángel Nieto Team (Spain) Inde Ángel Nieto Team | KTM | Moto2 | 96 | (United Kingdom) Jake Dixon | 1–3, 5–19 |
| (Spain) Sama Qatar Ángel Nieto Team (Spain) Gaviota Ángel Nieto Team (Spain) Inde Ángel Nieto Team | KTM | Moto2 | 54 | (Italy) Mattia Pasini | 4 |
| (Switzerland) MV Agusta Idealavoro Forward (Switzerland) MV Agusta Temporary Forward | MV Agusta | F2 | 62 | (Italy) Stefano Manzi | 1–2, 4–19 |
| (Switzerland) MV Agusta Idealavoro Forward (Switzerland) MV Agusta Temporary Forward | MV Agusta | F2 | 6 | (Italy) Gabriele Ruiu | 3 |
| (Switzerland) MV Agusta Idealavoro Forward (Switzerland) MV Agusta Temporary Forward | MV Agusta | F2 | 77 | (Switzerland) Dominique Aegerter | All |
| (Netherlands) NTS RW Racing GP | NTS | NH7 | 4 | (South Africa) Steven Odendaal | 4–12 |
| (Netherlands) NTS RW Racing GP | NTS | NH7 | 2 | (Switzerland) Jesko Raffin | 1–3, 15–18 |
| (Netherlands) NTS RW Racing GP | NTS | NH7 | 24 | (Italy) Simone Corsi | 13–14 |
| (Netherlands) NTS RW Racing GP | NTS | NH7 | 70 | (Italy) Tommaso Marcon | 19 |
| (Netherlands) NTS RW Racing GP | NTS | NH7 | 64 | (Netherlands) Bo Bendsneyder | All |
| (Italy) +Ego Speed Up (Italy) Beta Tools Speed Up (Italy) HDR Heidrun Speed Up (Italy) Lightech Speed Up (Italy) MB Conveyors Speed Up (Italy) Campetella Speed Up | Speed Up | SF19T | 9 | (Spain) Jorge Navarro | All |
| (Italy) +Ego Speed Up (Italy) Beta Tools Speed Up (Italy) HDR Heidrun Speed Up (Italy) Lightech Speed Up (Italy) MB Conveyors Speed Up (Italy) Campetella Speed Up | Speed Up | SF19T | 21 | (Italy) Fabio Di Giannantonio | All |

Key
Regular rider
Replacement rider

All the bikes used series-specified Dunlop tyres and Triumph 765cc 3-cylinder engines.

=== Team changes ===
- Tech3 switched manufacturers to KTM in line with their switch to KTM bikes in the MotoGP class, after having previously competed in Moto2 with their own chassis.
- MV Agusta returned to Grand Prix motorcycle racing after being absent for 42 years, joining forces with Forward Racing to compete in Moto2. This results in Suter's withdrawal from Moto2.
- Tasca Racing Scuderia Moto2 downsized to one bike again after having previously competed with two bikes in the 2018 season.
- Marinelli Snipers Team withdrew from Moto2.
- Ángel Nieto Team expanded its operations to field two bikes in Moto2.

=== Rider changes ===
- Jorge Martín moved up to Moto2 with Red Bull KTM Ajo, filling the spot vacated by Miguel Oliveira who moved up to MotoGP with KTM Tech3.
- Joan Mir moved up to MotoGP to join Team Suzuki Ecstar as a teammate to Álex Rins in 2019.
- Marco Bezzecchi and Philipp Öttl moved up to Moto2 with Red Bull KTM Tech3, replacing Bo Bendsneyder and Remy Gardner, who moved to NTS RW Racing GP and Onexox TKKR SAG Team respectively.
- Thomas Lüthi returned to Moto2 with Dynavolt Intact GP after one season in MotoGP, replacing Xavi Vierge, who moved to EG 0,0 Marc VDS.
- Sam Lowes left Swiss Innovative Investors team to return to Gresini Racing. Lowes previously competed with Gresini Racing in the 2016 Moto2 & 2017 MotoGP seasons. His seat was taken by Joe Roberts.
- Jorge Navarro moved to Speed Up Racing, replacing Danny Kent.
- Romano Fenati, who was on the provisional entry list, withdrew from the 2019 season after his contract with MV Agusta Forward was terminated due to the controversial incident at the 2018 San Marino Grand Prix. He returned to Moto3 with the Marinelli Snipers team.
- Nicolò Bulega moved up to Moto2 with Sky Racing Team VR46, filling the spot vacated by Francesco Bagnaia who moved up to MotoGP with Alma Pramac Racing.
- Fabio Di Giannantonio moved up to Moto2 with Speed Up Racing, replacing Fabio Quartararo who moved up to MotoGP.
- Enea Bastianini moved up to Moto2 with Italtrans Racing Team, replacing Mattia Pasini.
- Khairul Idham Pawi moved to Petronas Sprinta Racing, replacing Niki Tuuli, who moved to the MotoE World Cup.
- Jake Dixon made his full season debut with Ángel Nieto Team. He was partnered with Xavier Cardelús, who made his full season debut in Moto2 after he previously made some Moto2 appearances in the 2018 season as a wildcard & replacement rider.
- Idemitsu Honda Team Asia fielded two new riders for the 2019 season: Dimas Ekky Pratama and Somkiat Chantra, who moved up from CEV Moto2 and CEV Moto3 respectively.
- Tetsuta Nagashima returned to SAG Team, replacing Jules Danilo, who moved to the Supersport World Championship.
- Dominique Aegerter switched team from Kiefer Racing to MV Agusta Forward. His place was taken by Lukas Tulovic, who previously filled in for him for a few races in 2018.
- Isaac Viñales left Moto2 for the Supersport World Championship.

==== Mid-season changes ====
- Augusto Fernández was forced to miss the Austin round following a crash in the previous race. His place was filled by Mattia Pasini.
- Somkiat Chantra missed the Italian and German Grands Prix due to injury. He was replaced by Teppei Nagoe in Mugello.
- Philipp Öttl missed the German GP due to injuries sustained in a crash at Assen.
- Simone Corsi was dropped by Tasca Racing due to poor results and replaced by Mattia Pasini from the Czech GP onwards.
- Steven Odendaal was dropped from NTS RW Racing GP after the British GP. Simone Corsi was his replacement for the San Marino and Aragon GP, who was then replaced by Jesko Raffin from the Thailand GP onwards. Raffin also filled in for Odendaal in the first three races of the season, due to injury.
- Khairul Idham Pawi suffered a Grade 3 open fracture of his little finger in a crash during Friday practice at the 2019 Spanish motorcycle Grand Prix. He returned at the 2019 Czech Republic motorcycle Grand Prix, but withdrew after the Friday practice sessions due to injury and missed the rest of the season. During his absence, he was replaced by several riders:
  - Mattia Pasini (French and Italian GP)
  - Jonas Folger (Catalan, Dutch TT, German, Czech, and Austrian GP)
  - Bradley Smith (British GP)
  - Adam Norrodin (San Marino, Aragon, Thai, Japanese, Australian, Malaysian, and Valencian GP)

== Rule changes ==
The season saw the introduction of a new engine package. The Honda CBR600RR inline-4 engine package, which was used since the inaugural season of Moto2 in 2010, was replaced by a 765 cc (46.7 cu in) inline-3 engine manufactured by Triumph Motorcycles. It is based on the engine of the Triumph Street Triple RS 765. Due to availability constraints on the new Moto2 2019 engine, and the fact that there will be no machines of this specification in other championships, teams agreed to halt Moto2 wildcard entries for 2019.

This class and Moto3 also adopted the qualifying format used by MotoGP for the season, in which the riders that placed 15th or lower on combined times in the third free practice session would be admitted to qualifying 1, then the four fastest riders from that session would join the fastest 14 riders in qualifying 2.

The season saw the introduction of a new penalty called the "Long Lap" penalty for infractions such as exceeding track limits or engaging in reckless riding. At each circuit, a route is to be defined and marked at a safe point around the circuit (usually an asphalt run-off area outside of a turn). The penalised rider must ride through the defined area within 3 laps of being notified, thereby suffering a penalty equivalent typically to 2 or more seconds on that lap.

== Calendar ==
The following Grands Prix took place during the season:

| Round | Date | Grand Prix | Circuit |
|---|---|---|---|
| 1 | 10 March (Note: Night race) | VisitQatar Grand Prix | Lusail International Circuit, Lusail |
| 2 | 31 March | Gran Premio Motul de la República Argentina | Autódromo Termas de Río Hondo, Termas de Río Hondo |
| 3 | 14 April | (United States) Red Bull Grand Prix of The Americas | Circuit of the Americas, Austin |
| 4 | 5 May | (Spain) Gran Premio Red Bull de España | Circuito de Jerez, Jerez de la Frontera |
| 5 | 19 May | Shark Helmets Grand Prix de France | Bugatti Circuit, Le Mans |
| 6 | 2 June | (Italy) Gran Premio d'Italia Oakley | Mugello Circuit, Scarperia e San Piero |
| 7 | 16 June | (Catalonia) Gran Premi Monster Energy de Catalunya | Circuit de Barcelona-Catalunya, Montmeló |
| 8 | 30 June | (Netherlands) Motul TT Assen | TT Circuit Assen, Assen |
| 9 | 7 July | (Germany) HJC Helmets Motorrad Grand Prix Deutschland | Sachsenring, Hohenstein-Ernstthal |
| 10 | 4 August | (Czech Republic) Monster Energy Grand Prix České republiky | Brno Circuit, Brno |
| 11 | 11 August | (Austria) myWorld Motorrad Grand Prix von Österreich | Red Bull Ring, Spielberg |
| 12 | 25 August | (United Kingdom) GoPro British Grand Prix | Silverstone Circuit, Silverstone |
| 13 | 15 September | Gran Premio Octo di San Marino e della Riviera di Rimini | Misano World Circuit, Misano Adriatico |
| 14 | 22 September | (Aragon) Gran Premio Michelin de Aragón | MotorLand Aragón, Alcañiz |
| 15 | 6 October | PTT Thailand Grand Prix | Buriram International Circuit, Buriram |
| 16 | 20 October | Motul Grand Prix of Japan | Motegi Circuit, Motegi |
| 17 | 27 October | (Australia) Pramac Generac Australian Motorcycle Grand Prix | Phillip Island Grand Prix Circuit, Phillip Island |
| 18 | 3 November | Shell Malaysia Motorcycle Grand Prix | Sepang International Circuit, Sepang |
| 19 | 17 November | (Valencian Community) Gran Premio Motul de la Comunitat Valenciana | Circuit Ricardo Tormo, Valencia |

== Results and standings ==
=== Grands Prix ===
| Round | Grand Prix | Pole position | Fastest lap | Winning rider | Winning team | Winning constructor | Report |
|---|---|---|---|---|---|---|---|
| 1 | Qatar motorcycle Grand Prix | (Germany) Marcel Schrötter | (Switzerland) Thomas Lüthi | (Italy) Lorenzo Baldassarri | (Spain) Flexbox HP40 | (Germany) Kalex | Report |
| 2 | (Argentina) Argentine Republic motorcycle Grand Prix | (Spain) Xavi Vierge | (Australia) Remy Gardner | (Italy) Lorenzo Baldassarri | (Spain) Flexbox HP40 | (Germany) Kalex | Report |
| 3 | (United States) Motorcycle Grand Prix of the Americas | (Germany) Marcel Schrötter | (Switzerland) Thomas Lüthi | (Switzerland) Thomas Lüthi | (Germany) Dynavolt Intact GP | (Germany) Kalex | Report |
| 4 | (Spain) Spanish motorcycle Grand Prix | (Spain) Jorge Navarro | (Italy) Lorenzo Baldassarri | (Italy) Lorenzo Baldassarri | (Spain) Flexbox HP40 | (Germany) Kalex | Report |
| 5 | (France) French motorcycle Grand Prix | (Spain) Jorge Navarro | (Spain) Jorge Navarro | (Spain) Álex Márquez | (Belgium) EG 0,0 Marc VDS | (Germany) Kalex | Report |
| 6 | (Italy) Italian motorcycle Grand Prix | (Germany) Marcel Schrötter | (Spain) Álex Márquez | (Spain) Álex Márquez | (Belgium) EG 0,0 Marc VDS | (Germany) Kalex | Report |
| 7 | (Catalonia) Catalan motorcycle Grand Prix | (Spain) Augusto Fernández | (Spain) Álex Márquez | (Spain) Álex Márquez | (Belgium) EG 0,0 Marc VDS | (Germany) Kalex | Report |
| 8 | (Netherlands) Dutch TT | (Australia) Remy Gardner | (Spain) Augusto Fernández | (Spain) Augusto Fernández | (Spain) Flexbox HP40 | (Germany) Kalex | Report |
| 9 | (Germany) German motorcycle Grand Prix | (Spain) Álex Márquez | (Spain) Álex Márquez | (Spain) Álex Márquez | (Belgium) EG 0,0 Marc VDS | (Germany) Kalex | Report |
| 10 | Czech Republic motorcycle Grand Prix | (Spain) Álex Márquez | (Spain) Álex Márquez | (Spain) Álex Márquez | (Belgium) EG 0,0 Marc VDS | (Germany) Kalex | Report |
| 11 | (Austria) Austrian motorcycle Grand Prix | (Japan) Tetsuta Nagashima | (Italy) Luca Marini | (South Africa) Brad Binder | (Finland) Red Bull KTM Ajo | (Austria) KTM | Report |
| 12 | (United Kingdom) British motorcycle Grand Prix | (Spain) Álex Márquez | (Spain) Augusto Fernández | (Spain) Augusto Fernández | (Spain) Flexbox HP40 | (Germany) Kalex | Report |
| 13 | San Marino and Rimini Riviera motorcycle Grand Prix | (Italy) Fabio Di Giannantonio | (Spain) Augusto Fernández | (Spain) Augusto Fernández | (Spain) Flexbox HP40 | (Germany) Kalex | Report |
| 14 | Aragon motorcycle Grand Prix | (Spain) Álex Márquez | (Spain) Jorge Navarro | (South Africa) Brad Binder | (Finland) Red Bull KTM Ajo | (Austria) KTM | Report |
| 15 | Thailand motorcycle Grand Prix | (Spain) Álex Márquez | (Italy) Luca Marini | (Italy) Luca Marini | (Italy) Sky Racing Team VR46 | (Germany) Kalex | Report |
| 16 | (Japan) Japanese motorcycle Grand Prix | (Italy) Luca Marini | (Spain) Jorge Martín | (Italy) Luca Marini | (Italy) Sky Racing Team VR46 | (Germany) Kalex | Report |
| 17 | (Australia) Australian motorcycle Grand Prix | (Spain) Jorge Navarro | (Switzerland) Thomas Lüthi | (South Africa) Brad Binder | (Finland) Red Bull KTM Ajo | (Austria) KTM | Report |
| 18 | (Malaysia) Malaysian motorcycle Grand Prix | (Spain) Álex Márquez | (Spain) Álex Márquez | (South Africa) Brad Binder | (Finland) Red Bull KTM Ajo | (Austria) KTM | Report |
| 19 | Valencian Community motorcycle Grand Prix | (Spain) Jorge Navarro | (Switzerland) Thomas Lüthi | (South Africa) Brad Binder | (Finland) Red Bull KTM Ajo | (Austria) KTM | Report |

=== Riders' standings ===
Scoring system

Points were awarded to the top fifteen finishers. A rider had to finish the race to earn points.

| Position | 1st | 2nd | 3rd | 4th | 5th | 6th | 7th | 8th | 9th | 10th | 11th | 12th | 13th | 14th | 15th |
| Points | 25 | 20 | 16 | 13 | 11 | 10 | 9 | 8 | 7 | 6 | 5 | 4 | 3 | 2 | 1 |

| Pos. | Rider | Bike | Team | QAT (Qatar) | ARG (Argentina) | AME (United States) | SPA (Spain) | FRA (France) | ITA (Italy) | CAT (Catalonia) | NED (Netherlands) | GER (Germany) | CZE (Czech Republic) | AUT (Austria) | GBR (United Kingdom) | RSM (San Marino) | ARA (Aragon) | THA (Thailand) | JPN (Japan) | AUS (Australia) | MAL (Malaysia) | VAL (Valencian Community) | Pts |
|---|---|---|---|---|---|---|---|---|---|---|---|---|---|---|---|---|---|---|---|---|---|---|---|
| 1 | (Spain) Álex Márquez | Kalex | EG 0,0 Marc VDS | 7 | 3 | 5 | 24 | 1 | 1^{F} | 1^{F} | Ret | 1^{P F} | 1^{P F} | 2 | Ret^{P} | 3 | 3^{P} | 5^{P} | 6 | 8 | 2^{P F} | 30 | 262 |
| 2 | (South Africa) Brad Binder | KTM | Red Bull KTM Ajo | 12 | 6 | Ret | 5 | 4 | 15 | 11 | 2 | 2 | Ret | 1 | 3 | 6 | 1 | 2 | 12 | 1 | 1 | 1 | 259 |
| 3 | (Switzerland) Thomas Lüthi | Kalex | Dynavolt Intact GP | 2^{F} | Ret | 1^{F} | 4 | 6 | 3 | 2 | 4 | 5 | Ret | 6 | 8 | 4 | 6 | 7 | 2 | 3^{F} | 3 | 2^{F} | 250 |
| 4 | (Spain) Jorge Navarro | Speed Up | MB Conveyors Speed Up | Ret | 8 | 3 | 2^{P} | 2^{P F} | 7 | 3 | Ret | 8 | 4 | 3 | 2 | 7 | 2^{F} | 17 | 5 | 4^{P} | 5 | 3^{P} | 226 |
| 5 | (Spain) Augusto Fernández | Kalex | Flexbox HP40 | 5 | DNS | | 3 | 3 | 5 | 4^{P} | 1^{F} | 6 | 8 | 5 | 1^{F} | 1^{F} | 22 | 4 | 8 | 19 | 11 | 6 | 207 |
| 6 | (Italy) Luca Marini | Kalex | Sky Racing Team VR46 | 8 | 7 | 6 | 8 | 13 | 2 | 6 | 3 | 10 | 5 | Ret^{F} | 9 | 11 | 4 | 1^{F} | 1^{P} | Ret | 10 | 8 | 190 |
| 7 | (Italy) Lorenzo Baldassarri | Kalex | Flexbox HP40 | 1 | 1 | Ret | 1^{F} | Ret | 4 | Ret | Ret | 7 | 11 | 4 | 7 | 10 | 8 | 25 | 4 | 5 | 7 | 17 | 171 |
| 8 | (Germany) Marcel Schrötter | Kalex | Dynavolt Intact GP | 3^{P} | 5 | 2^{P} | 15 | 8 | 8^{P} | 7 | 8 | 3 | 6 | 9 | 14 | DNS | | 14 | 9 | 11 | 9 | 16 | 137 |
| 9 | (Italy) Fabio Di Giannantonio | Speed Up | MB Conveyors Speed Up | 11 | Ret | Ret | 12 | 12 | 10 | Ret | 11 | 4 | 2 | 14 | 6 | 2^{P} | 11 | 18 | 11 | 14 | Ret | 9 | 108 |
| 10 | (Italy) Enea Bastianini | Kalex | Italtrans Racing Team | 9 | 9 | 9 | 11 | 7 | 6 | 5 | Ret | 14 | 3 | Ret | DNS | 9 | 24 | 11 | 7 | 17 | 24 | 14 | 97 |
| 11 | (Spain) Jorge Martín | KTM | Red Bull KTM Ajo | 15 | Ret | 15 | Ret | 20 | 16 | 15 | Ret | 9 | 13 | 7 | 12 | 12 | 9 | 6 | 3^{F} | 2 | Ret | 5 | 94 |
| 12 | (Spain) Iker Lecuona | KTM | American Racing KTM | Ret | 4 | Ret | 10 | 9 | Ret | Ret | 15 | Ret | 10 | 8 | 11 | 21 | 7 | 3 | Ret | 7 | 6 | | 90 |
| 13 | (Spain) Xavi Vierge | Kalex | EG 0,0 Marc VDS | 10 | DNS^{P} | Ret | 6 | 5 | 12 | 8 | Ret | Ret | 24 | Ret | 10 | 8 | 10 | Ret | Ret | Ret | 4 | 7 | 81 |
| 14 | (Japan) Tetsuta Nagashima | Kalex | Onexox TKKR SAG Team | Ret | 12 | 12 | 7 | 11 | 14 | 10 | 5 | 12 | 9 | Ret^{P} | 5 | Ret | Ret | 15 | Ret | 10 | 8 | 21 | 78 |
| 15 | (Australia) Remy Gardner | Kalex | Onexox TKKR SAG Team | 4 | 2^{F} | 11 | DNS | Ret | 13 | Ret | Ret^{P} | 13 | 16 | Ret | 4 | Ret | 13 | 12 | Ret | 6 | 14 | 15 | 77 |
| 16 | (United Kingdom) Sam Lowes | Kalex | Federal Oil Gresini Moto2 | 6 | Ret | 7 | Ret | Ret | 9 | 9 | Ret | 11 | Ret | 24 | Ret | 5 | 5 | Ret | Ret | 20 | Ret | 10 | 66 |
| 17 | (Italy) Nicolò Bulega | Kalex | Sky Racing Team VR46 | Ret | Ret | | 9 | 10 | Ret | 13 | Ret | 18 | 7 | 13 | 20 | Ret | 12 | 8 | Ret | 12 | 12 | 22 | 48 |
| 18 | (Italy) Andrea Locatelli | Kalex | Italtrans Racing Team | 13 | 11 | 10 | 14 | Ret | 18 | 12 | 6 | 15 | 14 | 11 | 15 | 13 | 17 | 13 | 15 | 18 | 16 | 20 | 46 |
| 19 | (Italy) Stefano Manzi | MV Agusta | MV Agusta Temporary Forward | 20 | Ret | | 21 | 15 | Ret | Ret | 7 | 22 | 20 | 16 | 17 | 15 | 14 | Ret | 10 | 9 | Ret | 4 | 39 |
| 20 | (Italy) Mattia Pasini | Kalex | Flexbox HP40 | | | 4 | | | | | | | | | | | | | | | | | 35 |
| 20 | (Italy) Mattia Pasini | Kalex | Petronas Sprinta Racing | | | | | Ret | 11 | | | | | | | | | | | | | | 35 |
| 20 | (Italy) Mattia Pasini | Kalex | Tasca Racing Scuderia Moto2 | | | | | | | | | | Ret | 10 | 13 | DNS | | Ret | Ret | Ret | 13 | 11 | 35 |
| 20 | (Italy) Mattia Pasini | KTM | Sama Qatar Ángel Nieto Team | | | | Ret | | | | | | | | | | | | | | | | 35 |
| 21 | (Thailand) Somkiat Chantra | Kalex | Idemitsu Honda Team Asia | Ret | 10 | 20 | 17 | Ret | | 17 | DNS | | 15 | 12 | 16 | 14 | 16 | 9 | 13 | Ret | Ret | 23 | 23 |
| 22 | (Switzerland) Dominique Aegerter | MV Agusta | MV Agusta Temporary Forward | 18 | 20 | 14 | 13 | Ret | 17 | 16 | 9 | 20 | 21 | 17 | 18 | 18 | 19 | 16 | 14 | 27 | 15 | 12 | 19 |
| 23 | (Italy) Marco Bezzecchi | KTM | Red Bull KTM Tech3 | 26 | 16 | Ret | 22 | 18 | 23 | 23 | 10 | 19 | 12 | 23 | 19 | Ret | 15 | 10 | Ret | Ret | Ret | 19 | 17 |
| 24 | (Italy) Simone Corsi | Kalex | Tasca Racing Scuderia Moto2 | 19 | Ret | 8 | Ret | Ret | Ret | 14 | Ret | 21 | | | | | | | | | | | 10 |
| 24 | (Italy) Simone Corsi | NTS | NTS RW Racing GP | | | | | | | | | | | | | 19 | 21 | | | | | | 10 |
| 25 | (United Kingdom) Jake Dixon | KTM | Inde Ángel Nieto Team | Ret | 17 | DNS | | 17 | Ret | Ret | 12 | Ret | 18 | 19 | 23 | 20 | 23 | 19 | 17 | 21 | 17 | 13 | 7 |
| 26 | (Netherlands) Bo Bendsneyder | NTS | NTS RW Racing GP | 16 | 14 | 13 | 16 | Ret | 19 | 18 | Ret | 16 | 17 | 15 | 21 | 17 | 18 | 20 | 16 | 15 | Ret | 24 | 7 |
| 27 | (Switzerland) Jesko Raffin | NTS | NTS RW Racing GP | 14 | 15 | 16 | | | | | | | | | | | | 21 | 19 | 13 | 20 | | 6 |
| 27 | (Switzerland) Jesko Raffin | Kalex | Dynavolt Intact GP | | | | | | | | | | | | | | 20 | | | | | | 6 |
| 28 | (United States) Joe Roberts | KTM | American Racing KTM | 22 | 22 | Ret | 20 | 14 | Ret | 20 | 14 | 25 | DNS | 21 | 22 | 16 | 30 | Ret | 18 | 16 | 19 | 18 | 4 |
| 29 | (Germany) Lukas Tulovic | KTM | Kiefer Racing | 21 | 18 | 19 | 19 | 16 | 20 | 24 | 13 | 24 | Ret | 27 | 26 | 22 | 25 | Ret | Ret | 24 | 22 | Ret | 3 |
| 30 | (Malaysia) Khairul Idham Pawi | Kalex | Petronas Sprinta Racing | 17 | 13 | 17 | DNS | | | | | | WD | | | | | | | | | | 3 |
| 31 | (South Africa) Steven Odendaal | NTS | NTS RW Racing GP | | | | 18 | Ret | 22 | 22 | 16 | 23 | 22 | 20 | 25 | | | | | | | | 0 |
| 32 | (Germany) Jonas Folger | Kalex | Petronas Sprinta Racing | | | | | | | 19 | 17 | 17 | 19 | 18 | | | | | | | | | 0 |
| 33 | (Germany) Philipp Öttl | KTM | Red Bull KTM Tech3 | 23 | 19 | 18 | 23 | 19 | 21 | DNS | DNS | | 23 | 22 | 24 | 23 | 26 | 22 | 20 | 22 | 21 | 26 | 0 |
| 34 | (Indonesia) Dimas Ekky Pratama | Kalex | Idemitsu Honda Team Asia | 24 | 23 | 22 | DNS | Ret | 24 | 21 | DNS | DNS | DNS | | | | | 24 | 21 | 26 | 18 | 25 | 0 |
| 35 | (Andorra) Xavier Cardelús | KTM | Inde Ángel Nieto Team | 25 | 21 | Ret | 25 | Ret | 25 | 25 | 18 | 26 | 25 | 26 | 27 | 25 | 27 | Ret | 23 | 25 | 23 | 28 | 0 |
| 36 | (Italy) Gabriele Ruiu | MV Agusta | MV Agusta Idealavoro Forward | | | 21 | | | | | | | | | | | | | | | | | 0 |
| 36 | (Italy) Gabriele Ruiu | Kalex | Tasca Racing Scuderia Moto2 | | | | | | | | | | | | | | 28 | | | | | | 0 |
| 37 | (Malaysia) Adam Norrodin | Kalex | Petronas Sprinta Racing | | | | | | | | | | | | | Ret | DNS | 23 | 22 | 23 | Ret | 29 | 0 |
| 38 | (Indonesia) Andi Farid Izdihar | Kalex | Idemitsu Honda Team Asia | | | | | | | | | | | | | 24 | | | | | | | 0 |
| 39 | (Japan) Teppei Nagoe | Kalex | Idemitsu Honda Team Asia | | | | | | Ret | | | | | 25 | 28 | | | | | | | | 0 |
| 40 | (Italy) Tommaso Marcon | NTS | NTS RW Racing GP | | | | | | | | | | | | | | | | | | | 27 | 0 |
| 41 | (Indonesia) Gerry Salim | Kalex | Idemitsu Honda Team Asia | | | | | | | | | | | | | | 29 | | | | | | 0 |
| | (United Kingdom) Bradley Smith | Kalex | Petronas Sprinta Racing | | | | | | | | | | | | Ret | | | | | | | | 0 |
| | (United States) Sean Dylan Kelly | KTM | American Racing KTM | | | | | | | | | | | | | | | | | | | Ret | 0 |
| Pos. | Rider | Bike | Team | QAT (Qatar) | ARG (Argentina) | AME (United States) | SPA (Spain) | FRA (France) | ITA (Italy) | CAT (Catalonia) | NED (Netherlands) | GER (Germany) | CZE (Czech Republic) | AUT (Austria) | GBR (United Kingdom) | RSM (San Marino) | ARA (Aragon) | THA (Thailand) | JPN (Japan) | AUS (Australia) | MAL (Malaysia) | VAL (Valencian Community) | Pts |

Race key
| Colour | Result |
|---|---|
| Gold | Winner |
| Silver | 2nd place |
| Bronze | 3rd place |
| Green | Points finish |
| Blue | Non-points finish |
| Blue | Non-classified finish (NC) |
| Purple | Retired (Ret) |
| Red | Did not qualify (DNQ) |
| Black | Disqualified (DSQ) |
| White | Did not start (DNS) |
| White | Withdrew (WD) |
| White | Race cancelled (C) |
| Blank | Did not practice (DNP) |
| Blank | Excluded (EX) |
| Blank | Did not arrive (DNA) |
| Blank | Did not enter (empty cell) |
| Annotation | Meaning |
| P | Pole position |
| F | Fastest lap |
Rider key
| Colour | Meaning |
| Light blue | Rookie rider |

=== Constructors' standings ===
Each constructor received the same number of points as their best placed rider in each race.

| Pos. | Constructor | QAT (Qatar) | ARG (Argentina) | AME (United States) | SPA (Spain) | FRA (France) | ITA (Italy) | CAT (Catalonia) | NED (Netherlands) | GER (Germany) | CZE (Czech Republic) | AUT (Austria) | GBR (United Kingdom) | RSM (San Marino) | ARA (Aragon) | THA (Thailand) | JPN (Japan) | AUS (Australia) | MAL (Malaysia) | VAL (Valencian Community) | Pts |
|---|---|---|---|---|---|---|---|---|---|---|---|---|---|---|---|---|---|---|---|---|---|
| 1 | (Germany) Kalex | 1 | 1 | 1 | 1 | 1 | 1 | 1 | 1 | 1 | 1 | 2 | 1 | 1 | 3 | 1 | 1 | 3 | 2 | 2 | 442 |
| 2 | (Austria) KTM | 12 | 4 | 15 | 5 | 4 | 15 | 11 | 2 | 2 | 10 | 1 | 3 | 6 | 1 | 2 | 3 | 1 | 1 | 1 | 281 |
| 3 | (Italy) Speed Up | 11 | 8 | 3 | 2 | 2 | 7 | 3 | 11 | 4 | 2 | 3 | 2 | 2 | 2 | 17 | 5 | 4 | 5 | 3 | 259 |
| 4 | (Italy) MV Agusta | 18 | 20 | 14 | 13 | 15 | 17 | 16 | 7 | 20 | 20 | 16 | 17 | 15 | 14 | 16 | 10 | 9 | 15 | 4 | 45 |
| 5 | (Japan) NTS | 14 | 14 | 13 | 16 | Ret | 19 | 18 | 16 | 16 | 17 | 15 | 21 | 17 | 18 | 20 | 16 | 13 | 20 | 24 | 11 |
| Pos. | Constructor | QAT (Qatar) | ARG (Argentina) | AME (United States) | SPA (Spain) | FRA (France) | ITA (Italy) | CAT (Catalonia) | NED (Netherlands) | GER (Germany) | CZE (Czech Republic) | AUT (Austria) | GBR (United Kingdom) | RSM (San Marino) | ARA (Aragon) | THA (Thailand) | JPN (Japan) | AUS (Australia) | MAL (Malaysia) | VAL (Valencian Community) | Pts |

=== Teams' standings ===
The teams' standings were based on results obtained by regular and substitute riders.

| Pos. | Team | Bike No. | QAT (Qatar) | ARG (Argentina) | AME (United States) | SPA (Spain) | FRA (France) | ITA (Italy) | CAT (Catalonia) | NED (Netherlands) | GER (Germany) | CZE (Czech Republic) | AUT (Austria) | GBR (United Kingdom) | RSM (San Marino) | ARA (Aragon) | THA (Thailand) | JPN (Japan) | AUS (Australia) | MAL (Malaysia) | VAL (Valencian Community) | Pts |
|---|---|---|---|---|---|---|---|---|---|---|---|---|---|---|---|---|---|---|---|---|---|---|
| 1 | (Spain) Flexbox HP40 | 7 | 1 | 1 | Ret | 1^{F} | Ret | 4 | Ret | Ret | 7 | 11 | 4 | 7 | 10 | 8 | 25 | 4 | 5 | 7 | 17 | 391 |
| 1 | (Spain) Flexbox HP40 | 40 | 5 | DNS | | 3 | 3 | 5 | 4^{P} | 1^{F} | 6 | 8 | 5 | 1^{F} | 1^{F} | 22 | 4 | 8 | 19 | 11 | 6 | 391 |
| 1 | (Spain) Flexbox HP40 | 54 | | | 4 | | | | | | | | | | | | | | | | | 391 |
| 2 | (Germany) Dynavolt Intact GP | 2 | | | | | | | | | | | | | | 20 | | | | | | 387 |
| 2 | (Germany) Dynavolt Intact GP | 12 | 2^{F} | Ret | 1^{F} | 4 | 6 | 3 | 2 | 4 | 5 | Ret | 6 | 8 | 4 | 6 | 7 | 2 | 3^{F} | 3 | 2^{F} | 387 |
| 2 | (Germany) Dynavolt Intact GP | 23 | 3^{P} | 5 | 2^{P} | 15 | 8 | 8^{P} | 7 | 8 | 3 | 6 | 9 | 14 | DNS | | 14 | 9 | 11 | 9 | 16 | 387 |
| 3 | (Finland) Red Bull KTM Ajo | 41 | 12 | 6 | Ret | 5 | 4 | 15 | 11 | 2 | 2 | Ret | 1 | 3 | 6 | 1 | 2 | 12 | 1 | 1 | 1 | 353 |
| 3 | (Finland) Red Bull KTM Ajo | 88 | 15 | Ret | 15 | Ret | 20 | 16 | 15 | Ret | 9 | 13 | 7 | 12 | 12 | 9 | 6 | 3^{F} | 2 | Ret | 5 | 353 |
| 4 | (Belgium) EG 0,0 Marc VDS | 73 | 7 | 3 | 5 | 24 | 1 | 1^{F} | 1^{F} | Ret | 1^{P F} | 1^{P F} | 2 | Ret^{P} | 3 | 3^{P} | 5^{P} | 6 | 8 | 2^{P F} | 30 | 343 |
| 4 | (Belgium) EG 0,0 Marc VDS | 97 | 10 | DNS^{P} | Ret | 6 | 5 | 12 | 8 | Ret | Ret | 24 | Ret | 10 | 8 | 10 | Ret | Ret | Ret | 4 | 7 | 343 |
| 5 | (Italy) MB Conveyors Speed Up | 9 | Ret | 8 | 3 | 2^{P} | 2^{P F} | 7 | 3 | Ret | 8 | 4 | 3 | 2 | 7 | 2^{F} | 17 | 5 | 4^{P} | 5 | 3^{P} | 334 |
| 5 | (Italy) MB Conveyors Speed Up | 21 | 11 | Ret | Ret | 12 | 12 | 10 | Ret | 11 | 4 | 2 | 14 | 6 | 2^{P} | 11 | 18 | 11 | 14 | Ret | 9 | 334 |
| 6 | (Italy) Sky Racing Team VR46 | 10 | 8 | 7 | 6 | 8 | 13 | 2 | 6 | 3 | 10 | 5 | Ret^{F} | 9 | 11 | 4 | 1^{F} | 1^{P} | Ret | 10 | 8 | 238 |
| 6 | (Italy) Sky Racing Team VR46 | 11 | Ret | Ret | | 9 | 10 | Ret | 13 | Ret | 18 | 7 | 13 | 20 | Ret | 12 | 8 | Ret | 12 | 12 | 22 | 238 |
| 7 | (Spain) Onexox TKKR SAG Team | 45 | Ret | 12 | 12 | 7 | 11 | 14 | 10 | 5 | 12 | 9 | Ret^{P} | 5 | Ret | Ret | 15 | Ret | 10 | 8 | 21 | 155 |
| 7 | (Spain) Onexox TKKR SAG Team | 87 | 4 | 2^{F} | 11 | DNS | Ret | 13 | Ret | Ret^{P} | 13 | 16 | Ret | 4 | Ret | 13 | 12 | Ret | 6 | 14 | 15 | 155 |
| 8 | (Italy) Italtrans Racing Team | 5 | 13 | 11 | 10 | 14 | Ret | 18 | 12 | 6 | 15 | 14 | 11 | 15 | 13 | 17 | 13 | 15 | 18 | 16 | 20 | 143 |
| 8 | (Italy) Italtrans Racing Team | 33 | 9 | 9 | 9 | 11 | 7 | 6 | 5 | Ret | 14 | 3 | Ret | DNS | 9 | 24 | 11 | 7 | 17 | 24 | 14 | 143 |
| 9 | (United States) American Racing KTM | 16 | 22 | 22 | Ret | 20 | 14 | Ret | 20 | 14 | 25 | DNS | 21 | 22 | 16 | 30 | Ret | 18 | 16 | 19 | 18 | 94 |
| 9 | (United States) American Racing KTM | 27 | Ret | 4 | Ret | 10 | 9 | Ret | Ret | 15 | Ret | 10 | 8 | 11 | 21 | 7 | 3 | Ret | 7 | 6 | | 94 |
| 9 | (United States) American Racing KTM | 69 | | | | | | | | | | | | | | | | | | | Ret | 94 |
| 10 | (Italy) Federal Oil Gresini Moto2 | 22 | 6 | Ret | 7 | Ret | Ret | 9 | 9 | Ret | 11 | Ret | 24 | Ret | 5 | 5 | Ret | Ret | 20 | Ret | 10 | 66 |
| 11 | (Switzerland) MV Agusta Temporary Forward | 6 | | | 21 | | | | | | | | | | | | | | | | | 58 |
| 11 | (Switzerland) MV Agusta Temporary Forward | 62 | 20 | Ret | | 21 | 15 | Ret | Ret | 7 | 22 | 20 | 16 | 17 | 15 | 14 | Ret | 10 | 9 | Ret | 4 | 58 |
| 11 | (Switzerland) MV Agusta Temporary Forward | 77 | 18 | 20 | 14 | 13 | Ret | 17 | 16 | 9 | 20 | 21 | 17 | 18 | 18 | 19 | 16 | 14 | 27 | 15 | 12 | 58 |
| 12 | (Italy) Tasca Racing Scuderia Moto2 | 6 | | | | | | | | | | | | | | 28 | | | | | | 27 |
| 12 | (Italy) Tasca Racing Scuderia Moto2 | 24 | 19 | Ret | 8 | Ret | Ret | Ret | 14 | Ret | 21 | | | | | | | | | | | 27 |
| 12 | (Italy) Tasca Racing Scuderia Moto2 | 54 | | | | | | | | | | Ret | 10 | 13 | DNS | | Ret | Ret | Ret | 13 | 11 | 27 |
| 13 | (Japan) Idemitsu Honda Team Asia | 19 | | | | | | Ret | | | | | 25 | 28 | | | | | | | | 23 |
| 13 | (Japan) Idemitsu Honda Team Asia | 20 | 24 | 23 | 22 | DNS | Ret | 24 | 21 | DNS | DNS | DNS | | | | | 24 | 21 | 26 | 18 | 25 | 23 |
| 13 | (Japan) Idemitsu Honda Team Asia | 31 | | | | | | | | | | | | | | 29 | | | | | | 23 |
| 13 | (Japan) Idemitsu Honda Team Asia | 35 | Ret | 10 | 20 | 17 | Ret | | 17 | DNS | DNS | 15 | 12 | 16 | 14 | 16 | 9 | 13 | Ret | Ret | 23 | 23 |
| 13 | (Japan) Idemitsu Honda Team Asia | 36 | | | | | | | | | | | | | 24 | | | | | | | 23 |
| 14 | (France) Red Bull KTM Tech3 | 65 | 23 | 19 | 18 | 23 | 19 | 21 | DNS | DNS | | 23 | 22 | 24 | 23 | 26 | 22 | 20 | 22 | 21 | 26 | 17 |
| 14 | (France) Red Bull KTM Tech3 | 72 | 26 | 16 | Ret | 22 | 18 | 23 | 23 | 10 | 19 | 12 | 23 | 19 | Ret | 15 | 10 | Ret | Ret | Ret | 19 | 17 |
| 15 | (Netherlands) NTS RW Racing GP | 2 | 14 | 15 | 16 | | | | | | | | | | | | 21 | 19 | 13 | 20 | | 13 |
| 15 | (Netherlands) NTS RW Racing GP | 4 | | | | 18 | Ret | 22 | 22 | 16 | 23 | 22 | 20 | 25 | | | | | | | | 13 |
| 15 | (Netherlands) NTS RW Racing GP | 24 | | | | | | | | | | | | | 19 | 21 | | | | | | 13 |
| 15 | (Netherlands) NTS RW Racing GP | 64 | 16 | 14 | 13 | 16 | Ret | 19 | 18 | Ret | 16 | 17 | 15 | 21 | 17 | 18 | 20 | 16 | 15 | Ret | 24 | 13 |
| 15 | (Netherlands) NTS RW Racing GP | 70 | | | | | | | | | | | | | | | | | | | 27 | 13 |
| 16 | (Malaysia) Petronas Sprinta Racing | 38 | | | | | | | | | | | | Ret | | | | | | | | 8 |
| 16 | (Malaysia) Petronas Sprinta Racing | 47 | | | | | | | | | | | | | Ret | DNS | 23 | 22 | 23 | Ret | 29 | 8 |
| 16 | (Malaysia) Petronas Sprinta Racing | 54 | | | | | Ret | 11 | | | | | | | | | | | | | | 8 |
| 16 | (Malaysia) Petronas Sprinta Racing | 89 | 17 | 13 | 17 | DNS | | | | | | WD | | | | | | | | | | 8 |
| 16 | (Malaysia) Petronas Sprinta Racing | 94 | | | | | | | 19 | Ret | 17 | 19 | 18 | | | | | | | | | 8 |
| 17 | (Spain) Inde Ángel Nieto Team | 18 | 25 | 21 | Ret | 25 | Ret | 25 | 25 | 18 | 26 | 25 | 26 | 27 | 25 | 27 | Ret | 23 | 25 | 23 | 28 | 7 |
| 17 | (Spain) Inde Ángel Nieto Team | 54 | | | | Ret | | | | | | | | | | | | | | | | 7 |
| 17 | (Spain) Inde Ángel Nieto Team | 96 | Ret | 17 | DNS | | 17 | Ret | Ret | 12 | Ret | 18 | 19 | 23 | 20 | 23 | 19 | 17 | 21 | 17 | 13 | 7 |
| 18 | (Germany) Kiefer Racing | 3 | 21 | 18 | 19 | 19 | 16 | 20 | 24 | 13 | 24 | Ret | 27 | 26 | 22 | 25 | Ret | Ret | 24 | 22 | Ret | 3 |
| Pos. | Team | Bike No. | QAT (Qatar) | ARG (Argentina) | AME (United States) | SPA (Spain) | FRA (France) | ITA (Italy) | CAT (Catalonia) | NED (Netherlands) | GER (Germany) | CZE (Czech Republic) | AUT (Austria) | GBR (United Kingdom) | RSM (San Marino) | ARA (Aragon) | THA (Thailand) | JPN (Japan) | AUS (Australia) | MAL (Malaysia) | VAL (Valencian Community) | Pts |
