= Jesko Raffin =

Swiss motorcycle racer (born 1996)

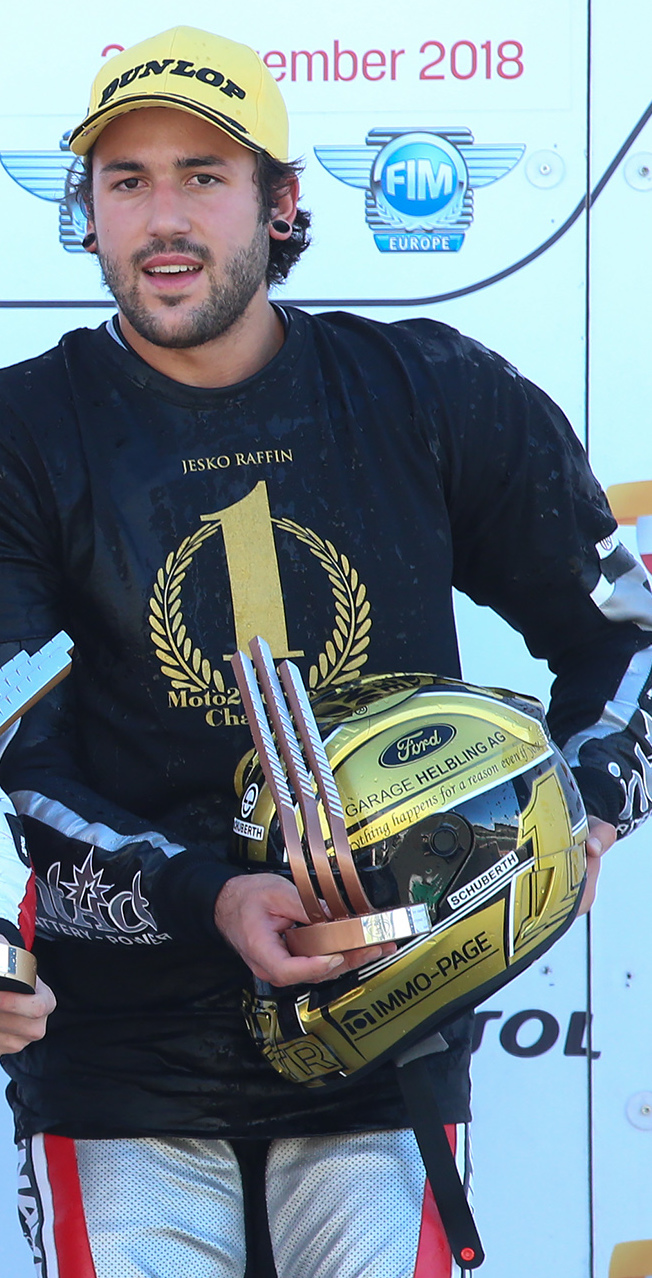
- Raffin in 2018
- Nationality: Swiss
- Born: 12 June 1996 (age 30); Zürich, Switzerland
- Bike number: 2
Motorcycle racing career statistics
Moto2 World Championship
Active years	2012, 2015–2020
Manufacturers	Kalex, NTS
Championships	0
2020 championship position	33rd (0 pts)
Starts / Wins / Podiums / Poles / F. laps / Points; 73 / 0 / 0 / 0 / 0 / 56
MotoE World Championship
Active years	2019
Manufacturers	Energica
Championships	0
2019 championship position	7th (47 pts)
Starts / Wins / Podiums / Poles / F. laps / Points; 6 / 0 / 0 / 0 / 0 / 47

Jesko Raffin (born 12 June 1996) is a Swiss motorcycle racer. He was the FIM CEV Moto2 Champion in 2014 and 2018.

== Career ==
Raffin made his debut in the Moto2 World Championship in 2012 with GP Team Switzerland as a replacement for the injured Randy Krummenacher; in three races he had an 18th place at Sepang as best finish.

After winning the CEV Moto2 Championship in 2014, Raffin was back to the Moto2 World Championship as a full-time rider in 2015, competing with a Kalex for the Sports-Millions–Emwe–SAG team. He failed to score championship points, as his best result was 17th place, obtained in third occasions—Indianapolis, Motegi and Phillip Island. Raffin remained with the same team for 2016. He achieved his first Grand Prix points at Jerez with a 14th place and a best result of eighth at Sachsenring.

In 2017, Raffin switched to the Garage Plus Interwetten team from his home country Switzerland. He collected 26 points and finished 20th in the standings. Raffin did not find a ride for the 2018 season, but was recalled by his former SAG team as a replacement rider for six of the final seven races after Isaac Viñales parted ways with the team prematurely. In six races, Raffin achieved ten points and 22nd in the standings. In the same year, he won the FIM CEV Moto2 European Championship.

In 2019, Raffin joined the inaugural MotoE World Cup with the German Dynavolt Intact GP team. He collected 47 points and finished the season in eighth. Raffin also had eight replacement rider entries in the Moto2 season, one with the Intact GP team and seven with RW Racing GP. Having impressed in his replacement entries with RW, Raffin was signed by the team to make his full-time return to Moto2 for 2020.

== Career statistics ==
=== FIM CEV Moto2 European Championship ===
==== Races by year ====
(key) (Races in bold indicate pole position, races in italics indicate fastest lap)

Year	Bike	1	2	3	4	5	6	7	8	9	10	11	Pos	Pts
2014	Kalex	JER; Ret	**ARA1**; 1	**ARA2**; 1	CAT; 1	**ALB**; 1	NAV1; 4	NAV2; 1	ALG1; 4	ALG2; 6	VAL; 1		1st	186
2018	Kalex	EST1; 3	EST2; 1	**VAL**; 1	**CAT1**; 1	**CAT2**; 2	ARA1; 2	ARA2; 2	JER; 2	ALB1; 5	ALB2; 6		1st	203
2018	Suter											VAL; 3	1st	203

=== Grand Prix motorcycle racing ===
==== By season ====
Season	Class	Motorcycle	Team	Race	Win	Podium	Pole	FLap	Pts	Plcd
2012	Moto2	Kalex	GP Team Switzerland	3	0	0	0	0	0	NC
2015	Moto2	Kalex	Sports-Millions-EMWE-SAG	18	0	0	0	0	0	NC
2016	Moto2	Kalex	Sports-Millions-EMWE-SAG	17	0	0	0	0	14	25th
2017	Moto2	Kalex	Garage Plus Interwetten	18	0	0	0	0	26	20th
2018	Moto2	Kalex	SAG Team	6	0	0	0	0	10	22nd
2019	Moto2	NTS	NTS RW Racing GP	8	0	0	0	0	6	27th
2019	Moto2	Kalex	Dynavolt Intact GP	8	0	0	0	0	6	27th
2019	MotoE	Energica	Dynavolt Intact GP	6	0	0	0	0	47	8th
2020	Moto2	NTS	NTS RW Racing GP	3	0	0	0	0	0	33rd
Total				**79**	**0**	**0**	**0**	**0**	**103**	

==== By class ====
Class	Seasons	1st GP	1st Pod	1st Win	Race	Win	Podiums	Pole	FLap	Pts	WChmp
Moto2	2012, 2015–2020	2012 Aragon			73	0	0	0	0	56	0
MotoE	2019	2019 Germany			6	0	0	0	0	47	0
Total	2012, 2015–2020				**79**	**0**	**0**	**0**	**0**	**103**	**0**

==== Races by year ====
(key) (Races in bold indicate pole position, races in italics indicate fastest lap)

Year	Class	Bike	1	2	3	4	5	6	7	8	9	10	11	12	13	14	15	16	17	18	19	Pos	Pts
2012	Moto2	Kalex	QAT	SPA	POR	FRA	CAT	GBR	NED	GER	ITA	INP	CZE	RSM	ARA; 27	JPN; 28	MAL; 18	AUS	VAL			NC	0
2015	Moto2	Kalex	QAT; 22	AME; 24	ARG; 28	SPA; 25	FRA; 24	ITA; 23	CAT; 24	NED; 21	GER; 21	INP; 17	CZE; 26	GBR; 21	RSM; Ret	ARA; 20	JPN; 17	AUS; 17	MAL; 21	VAL; 24		NC	0
2016	Moto2	Kalex	QAT; 18	ARG; 23	AME; 21	SPA; 14	FRA; 23	ITA; 26	CAT; DNS	NED; 18	GER; 8	AUT; 24	CZE; 24	GBR; 17	RSM; 15	ARA; 20	JPN; 17	AUS; 13	MAL; 16	VAL; 17		25th	14
2017	Moto2	Kalex	QAT; 14	ARG; 13	AME; 21	SPA; 20	FRA; 23	ITA; 23	CAT; 23	NED; 17	GER; 16	CZE; 29	AUT; 18	GBR; 27	RSM; 9	ARA; 23	JPN; 25	AUS; 4	MAL; 15	VAL; 21		20th	26
2018	Moto2	Kalex	QAT	ARG	AME	SPA	FRA	ITA	CAT	NED	GER	CZE	AUT	GBR	RSM; 15	ARA; 23	THA	JPN; 20	AUS; 8	MAL; 19	VAL; 15	22nd	10
2019	Moto2	NTS	QAT; 14	ARG; 15	AME; 16	SPA	FRA	ITA	CAT	NED	GER	CZE	AUT	GBR	RSM		THA; 21	JPN; 19	AUS; 13	MAL; 20	VAL	27th	6
2019	Moto2	Kalex														ARA; 20						27th	6
2019	MotoE	Energica	GER; 13	AUT; 9	RSM1; 4	RSM2; 7	VAL1; 7	VAL2; 10														8th	47
2020	Moto2	NTS	QAT; 23	SPA; 21	ANC; DNS	CZE	AUT	STY	RSM; Ret	EMI	CAT	FRA	ARA	TER	EUR	VAL	POR					33rd	0
