= Daniel Sáez (motorcyclist, born 1996) =

Spanish motorcycle racer

- Nationality: Spanish
- Born: 21 November 1996 (age 29); Talavera de la Reina, Spain
- Current team: Champi Women Racing Team-JJSaez Motos Clasica
- Bike number: 26
Motorcycle racing career statistics
Moto3 World Championship
Active years	2016
Manufacturers	KTM
2016 championship position	NC (0 pts)
Starts / Wins / Podiums / Poles / F. laps / Points; 1 / 0 / 0 / 0 / 0 / 0

Daniel Sáez Gutiérrez (born 21 November 1996) is a Spanish motorcycle racer. He races in the RFME Superstock 600 Championship aboard a Yamaha YZF-R6.

== Career statistics ==
=== FIM CEV Moto3 Junior World Championship ===
==== Races by year ====
(key) (Races in bold indicate pole position, races in italics indicate fastest lap)

Year	Bike	1	2	3	4	5	6	7	8	9	10	11	12	Pos	Pts
2012	Honda	JER; 14	NAV; 18	ARA; 18	CAT; 27	ALB1; Ret	ALB2; 26	VAL; 22						20th	16
2014	Suter Honda	JER1; 13	JER2; Ret	LMS; 22	ARA; 24	CAT1; 35	CAT2; 31	ALB; 27	NAV; Ret	ALG	VAL1	VAL2		24th	10
2014	Mahindra	JER1	JER2	LMS	ARA	CAT1	CAT2	ALB	NAV	ALG; 9	VAL1; 22	VAL2; 25		24th	10
2015	Suter Honda	ALG	LMS	CAT1	CAT2	ARA1	ARA2	ALB	NAV	JER1; 21	JER2; 24	VAL1	VAL2	NC	0
2016	KTM	VAL1	VAL2	LMS	ARA	CAT1	CAT2	ALB	ALG	JER1	JER2	VAL1; 15	VAL2; 17	36th	1

=== FIM CEV Stock 600 Championship ===
==== Races by year ====
(key) (Races in bold indicate pole position) (Races in italics indicate fastest lap)

Year	Bike	1	2	3	4	5	6	7	8	9	10	11	12	Pos	Pts
2017	Yamaha	ALB	CAT1	CAT2	VAL1	VAL2	EST1	EST2	JER	ARA1	ARA2	VAL; 1		6th	25
2018	Yamaha	EST1	EST2	VAL; 2	CAT1	CAT2	ARA1	ARA2	JER; 2	ALB1	ALB2	VAL		10th	40

=== Grand Prix motorcycle racing ===
==== By season ====
Season	Class	Motorcycle	Team	Race	Win	Podium	Pole	FLap	Pts	Plcd
2016	Moto3	KTM	GA Competición	1	0	0	0	0	0	NC
Total				**1**	**0**	**0**	**0**	**0**	**0**	

==== Races by year ====
Year	Class	Bike	1	2	3	4	5	6	7	8	9	10	11	12	13	14	15	16	17	18	Pos.	Pts
2016	Moto3	KTM	QAT	ARG	AME	SPA	FRA	ITA	CAT	NED	GER	AUT	CZE	GBR	RSM	ARA	JPN	AUS	MAL	VAL; 29	NC	0

=== FIM Endurance World Cup ===
Year	Team	Bike	Tyre	Rider	Pts	TC
2025	(France) Team 33 Louit April Moto	Kawasaki ZX-10R	**D**	(Spain) David Sanchís (France) Guillaume Antiga (United Kingdom) Tom Neave (Spain) Daniel Sáez	31*	10th*
