= 2017 FIM CEV Moto2 European Championship =

2017 FIM CEV Moto2 European Championship
Previous:	2016	Next:	2018
Support series: FIM CEV Moto3 Junior World Championship; European Talent Cup

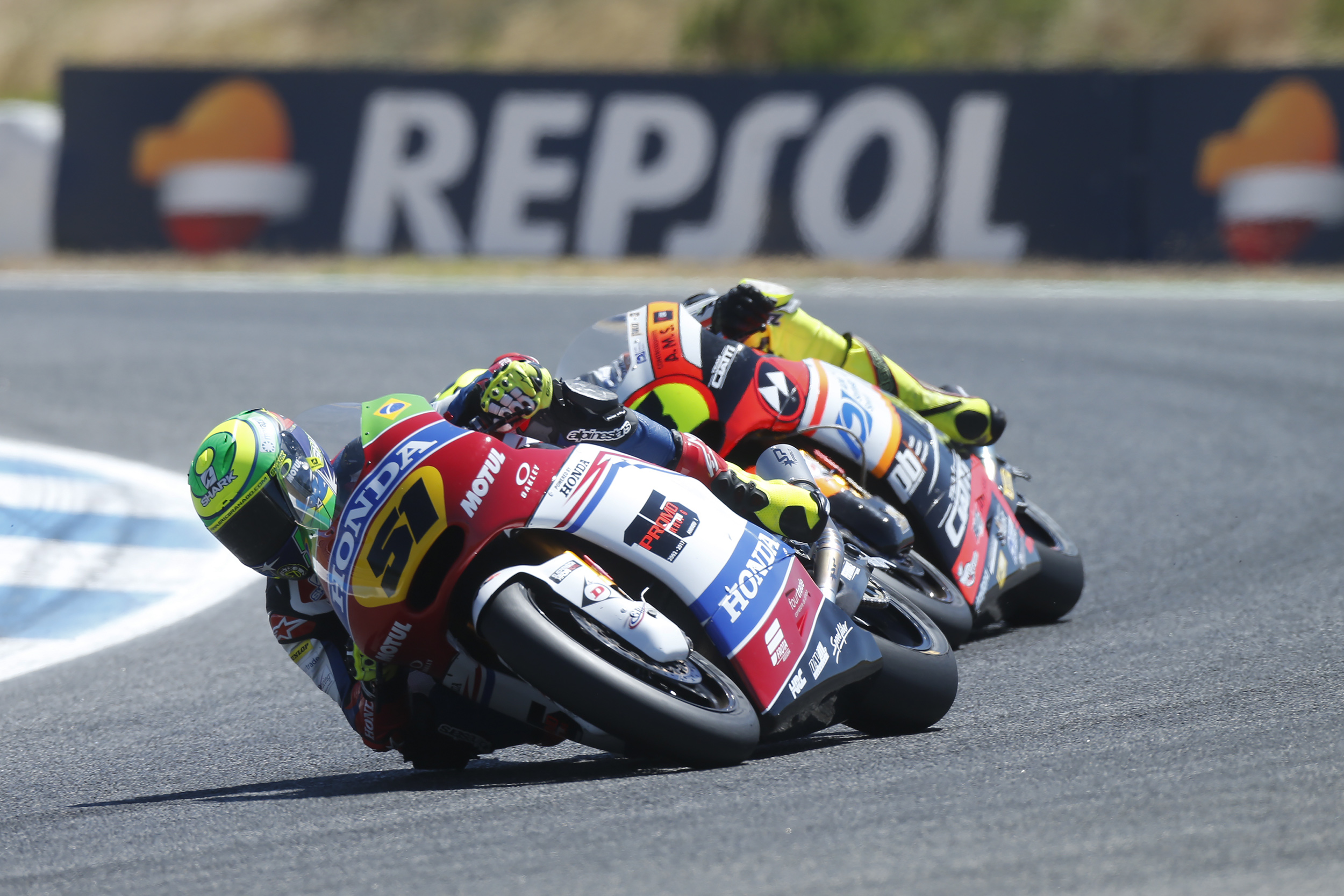
2017 champion Eric Granado

The 2017 FIM CEV Moto2 European Championship was the eighth CEV Moto2 season and the third under the FIM banner.

== Calendar ==
The following races were scheduled to take place in 2017.

Round	Date	Circuit	Pole position	Fastest lap	Race winner	Winning constructor	Sources
1	30 April	(Spain) Albacete	(Malaysia) Hafizh Syahrin	(Malaysia) Hafizh Syahrin	(Malaysia) Hafizh Syahrin	(Germany) Kalex	
2	18 June	(Spain) Catalunya	(Spain) Ricard Cardús	(Spain) Ricard Cardús	(Spain) Ricard Cardús	(Germany) Kalex	
2	18 June	(Spain) Catalunya	(Spain) Ricard Cardús	(Spain) Ricard Cardús	(Spain) Ricard Cardús	(Germany) Kalex	
3	9 July	(Spain) Valencia	(Brazil) Eric Granado	(Brazil) Eric Granado	(Brazil) Eric Granado	(Germany) Kalex	
3	9 July	(Spain) Valencia	(Brazil) Eric Granado	(Brazil) Eric Granado	(Brazil) Eric Granado	(Germany) Kalex	
4	23 July	(Portugal) Estoril	(Germany) Lukas Tulovic	(Brazil) Eric Granado	(Brazil) Eric Granado	(Germany) Kalex	
4	23 July	(Portugal) Estoril	(Germany) Lukas Tulovic	(Spain) Ricard Cardús	(Brazil) Eric Granado	(Germany) Kalex	
5	17 September	(Spain) Jerez	(Spain) Ricard Cardús	(Brazil) Eric Granado	(Spain) Ricard Cardús	(Germany) Kalex	
6	8 October	(Spain) Aragón	(Spain) Ricard Cardús	(Brazil) Eric Granado	(Spain) Ricard Cardús	(Germany) Kalex	
6	8 October	(Spain) Aragón	(Spain) Ricard Cardús	(Spain) Ricard Cardús	(Brazil) Eric Granado	(Germany) Kalex	
7	19 November	(Spain) Valencia	(Brazil) Eric Granado	(Brazil) Eric Granado	(Brazil) Eric Granado	(Germany) Kalex	

== Entry list ==
Team	Bike	No.	Rider	Rounds
Team Hipopótamo/Beauty Mercier/In Bacco	Yamaha	2	(Portugal) Carlos Mercier*	4–5
(Spain) Team Stratos (Spain) Stratos Racing Team	Ariane2	2	(France) Cédric Tangre	6
(Spain) Team Stratos (Spain) Stratos Racing Team	Ariane2	23	(Czech Republic) Jirka Mrkývka	7
(Spain) Team Stratos (Spain) Stratos Racing Team	Ariane2	99	(Spain) Óscar Gutiérrez	1–3
(Spain) Team Stratos (Spain) Stratos Racing Team	Yamaha	12	(Mauritius) Luc Mamet*	1–2
(Switzerland) Forward Junior Team	Kalex	3	(Germany) Lukas Tulovic	All
(Switzerland) Forward Junior Team	Kalex	22	(Italy) Federico Fuligni	All
FAU55Racing	Yamaha	8	(Italy) Alessandro Zetti*	7
(France) Promoto Sport	Transfiormers	9	(France) Corentin Perolari	2–3, 6–7
(France) Promoto Sport	Transfiormers	16	(France) Gregg Black	1
(Spain) Team Stylobike	Kalex	10	(Australia) Mark Chiodo	7
(Spain) Team Stylobike	Kalex	18	(Andorra) Xavier Cardelús	1–4, 6–7
(Spain) Team Stylobike	Kalex	88	(Spain) Ricard Cardús	All
Team Wimu CNS	Tech 3	14	(Spain) Héctor Garzó	All
Team Wimu CNS	Tech 3	17	(Spain) Marc Luna	1–4
Team Wimu CNS	Tech 3	97	(Spain) Javier Orellana	5
(Spain) H43 Team Nobby	Transfiormers	15	(Norway) Thomas Sigvartsen	1–2
(Spain) H43 Team Nobby	Kalex	46	(Switzerland) Marcel Brenner	1–3, 5–7
(France) JEG Racing	Yamaha	19	(France) Paul Dufour*	3
(Indonesia) Astra Honda Racing Team	Kalex	20	(Indonesia) Dimas Ekky Pratama	All
Willi Race Racing Team; Willi Racing Team	Kalex	23	(Czech Republic) Jirka Mrkývka	1–3
Willi Race Racing Team; Willi Racing Team	Kalex	98	(Czech Republic) Karel Hanika	6–7
Champi Women–JJSáez Team	Yamaha	26	(Spain) Daniel Sáez*	7
(Spain) AGR Team	Kalex	27	(United States) Joe Roberts	All
(Spain) AGR Team	Kalex	36	(United States) Jayson Uribe	All
S.G.Motoperformance	Yamaha	28	(Spain) Jorge Olmos*	7
(Spain) Promoracing (Spain) Promo Racing Team	Kalex	32	(Argentina) Fausto Grantón	3
(Spain) Promoracing (Spain) Promo Racing Team	Kalex	37	(Ukraine) Oleksandr Anin	7
(Spain) Promoracing (Spain) Promo Racing Team	Kalex	51	(Brazil) Eric Granado	All
VHC Racing	Kawasaki	33	(United States) Bruce Stafford*	7
(Spain) Easyrace Moto2 Team	Suter	37	(Spain) Augusto Fernández	1
(Spain) Easyrace Moto2 Team	Suter	75	(Portugal) Ivo Lopes	4
(Spain) Easyrace Moto2 Team	Suter	96	(Spain) David Sanchis	2–3, 5–7
(Italy) Bierreti	Kalex	39	(Italy) Federico Menozzi	1–2
(Japan) NTS Sportscode T.PRO	NTS	44	(South Africa) Steven Odendaal	All
(Japan) NTS Sportscode T.PRO	NTS	76	(Japan) Hiroki Ono	All
TST Racing	Honda	47	(Spain) Jonatan Gomis*	7
DCR Racing Team	Yamaha	48	(Spain) Joan Díaz*	7
Petronas Raceline Malaysia	Kalex	55	(Malaysia) Hafizh Syahrin	1
Metal Lube Racing Team	Yamaha	58	(Spain) Laura Martínez*	5
(Spain) Yamaha Laglisse	Yamaha	66	(France) Philippe Le Gallo*	All
(Spain) Bullit Motorcycles	Kalex	71	(Sweden) Pontus Duerlund	1–3, 5–7
Peppo Russo	Yamaha	81	(Italy) Giovanni Altomonte*	7
Response RE Racing	Kawasaki	83	(Australia) Lachlan Epis*	6
(United Kingdom) Nykos Racing	Nykos	87	(United Kingdom) Jamie Edwards	1–2, 5–7
Equipo Puntomoto	Mir Racing	94	(Hungary) Richárd Bódis	7
(Spain) DSM	Mir Racing	96	(Spain) David Sanchis	1

* Superstock 600

== Championship standings ==
Pos.	Rider	Bike	ALB (Spain)	CAT (Spain)		VAL (Spain)		EST (Portugal)		JER (Spain)	ARA (Spain)		VAL (Spain)	Pts
Moto2
1	(Brazil) Eric Granado	Kalex	5	2	7	**1**	**1**	1	1	2	3	1	**1**	226
2	(Spain) Ricard Cardús	Kalex		**1**	**1**	2	2	2	11	**1**	**1**	**2**	Ret	185
3	(South Africa) Steven Odendaal	NTS	4	4	4	6	3	3	2	3	2	Ret	2	157
4	(Spain) Héctor Garzó	Tech 3	2	5	3	3	Ret	5	4	Ret	6	3	4	126
5	(United States) Joe Roberts	Kalex	8	6	2	Ret	4	11	3	6	4	Ret	3	111
6	(Indonesia) Dimas Ekky Pratama	Kalex	6	3	5	14	6	7	Ret	4	5	5	7	102
7	(Italy) Federico Fuligni	Kalex	9	7	6	7	7	6	5	9	8	7	5	100
8	(Japan) Hiroki Ono	NTS	12	Ret	12	8	5	8	7	7	11	6	10	74
9	(Germany) Lukas Tulovic	Kalex	11	Ret	9	5	Ret	**4**	**12**	5	10	Ret	Ret	57
10	(Spain) David Sanchis	MIR Racing	Ret											50
10	(Spain) David Sanchis	Suter		13	14	4	Ret			8	9	9	6	50
11	(United States) Jayson Uribe	Kalex	10	11	Ret	Ret	10	Ret	9	10	12	12	8	46
12	(Andorra) Xavier Cardelús	Kalex	14	8	10	DNS	9	Ret	8		13	11	13	42
13	(France) Corentin Perolari	Transfiormers		9	8	DNS	Ret				7	4	Ret	37
14	(Switzerland) Marcel Brenner	Kalex	7	10	11	DNS	DNS			Ret	Ret	8	Ret	28
15	(Malaysia) Hafizh Syahrin	Kalex	**1**											25
16	(Spain) Óscar Gutiérrez	Ariane2	13	12	13	9	8							25
17	(Spain) Marc Luna	Tech 3	17	15	15	10	11	10	10					25
18	(Sweden) Pontus Duerlund	Kalex	16	14	Ret	11	13			11	16	13	12	22
19	(Portugal) Ivo Lopes	Suter						9	6					17
20	(Spain) Augusto Fernández	Suter	3											16
21	(Czech Republic) Karel Hanika	Kalex									14	10	9	15
22	(France) Philippe Le Gallo	Yamaha	DNQ	17	18	15	15	13	14	13	17	15	20	11
23	(Argentina) Fausto Grantón	Kalex				12	12							8
24	(Portugal) Carlos Mercier	Yamaha						12	13	DNQ				7
25	(Spain) Daniel Sáez	Yamaha											11	5
26	(France) Paul Dufour	Yamaha				13	14							5
27	(Spain) Laura Martínez	Yamaha								12				4
28	(Australia) Lachlan Epis	Kawasaki									15	14		3
29	(Hungary) Richárd Bódis	MIR Racing											14	2
30	(Czech Republic) Jirka Mrkývka	Kalex	15	16	16	Ret	DNS							2
30	(Czech Republic) Jirka Mrkývka	Ariane2											15	2
	(Ukraine) Oleksandr Anin	Kalex											17	0
	(United Kingdom) Jamie Edwards	Nykos	18	Ret	Ret					DNQ	DNQ	DNQ	DNQ	0
	(Norway) Thomas Sigvartsen	Transfiormers	Ret	Ret	Ret									0
	(France) Cédric Tangre	Ariane2									Ret	Ret		0
	(Australia) Mark Chiodo	Kalex											Ret	0
	(Spain) Javier Orellana	Tech 3								Ret				0
	(France) Gregg Black	Transfiormers	Ret											0
	(Italy) Federico Menozzi	Kalex	DNQ	DNQ	DNQ									0
Superstock 600
1	(France) Philippe Le Gallo	Yamaha	DNQ	17	18	15	15	13	14	13	17	15	20	196
2	(Australia) Lachlan Epis	Kawasaki									15	14		50
3	(Portugal) Carlos Mercier	Yamaha						12	13	DNQ				50
4	(France) Paul Dufour	Yamaha				13	14							50
5	(Mauritius) Luc Mamet	Yamaha	DNQ	18	17									45
6	(Spain) Daniel Sáez	Yamaha											11	25
7	(Spain) Laura Martínez	Yamaha								12				25
8	(Spain) Joan Díaz	Yamaha											16	20
9	(Italy) Alessandro Zetti	Yamaha											18	16
10	(Spain) Jonatan Gomis	Honda											19	13
11	(United States) Bruce Stafford	Kawasaki											21	10
	(Spain) Jorge Olmos	Yamaha											Ret	0
	(Italy) Giovanni Altomonte	Yamaha											DNQ	0
Pos.	Rider	Bike	ALB (Spain)	CAT (Spain)		VAL (Spain)		EST (Portugal)		JER (Spain)	ARA (Spain)		VAL (Spain)	Pts

Colour	Result
Gold	Winner
Silver	Second place
Bronze	Third place
Green	Points classification
Blue	Non-points classification
Blue	Non-classified finish (NC)
Purple	Retired, not classified (Ret)
Red	Did not qualify (DNQ)
Red	Did not pre-qualify (DNPQ)
Black	Disqualified (DSQ)
White	Did not start (DNS)
White	Withdrew (WD)
White	Race cancelled (C)
Blank	Did not practice (DNP)
Blank	Did not arrive (DNA)
Blank	Excluded (EX)

**Bold** – Pole position
Italics – Fastest lap
