= Dimas Ekky Pratama =

Indonesian motorcycle rider

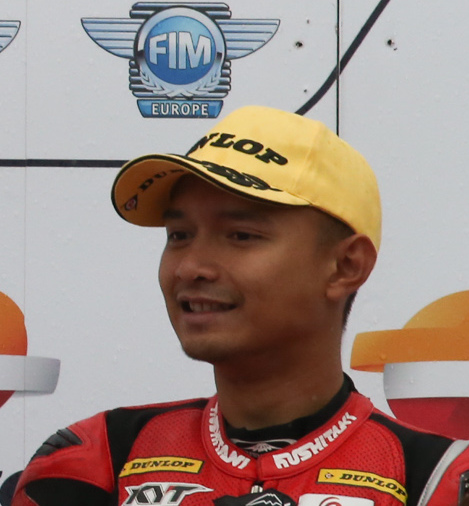
- Pratama in 2018
- Nationality: Indonesian
- Born: 26 October 1992 (age 34); Depok, West Java, Indonesia
- Current team: Niti Racing
- Bike number: 20
- Website: www.dimaspratama20.com
Motorcycle racing career statistics
Moto2 World Championship
Active years	2017–2019, 2021
Manufacturers	Kalex, Honda, Tech 3
Championships	0
2021 championship position	NC (0 pts)
Starts / Wins / Podiums / Poles / F. laps / Points; 14 / 0 / 0 / 0 / 0 / 0

Dimas Ekky Pratama (born 26 October 1992) is an Indonesian motorcycle racer who last raced in the Harley-Davidson Bagger World Cup for Niti Racing.

== Career ==
=== Early career ===
Pratama's racing career started in 2010, where he competed in IRS (Indonesian Racing Series) Supersport 600cc class. In his maiden season, he achieved fourth in the final standings, fifth in 2011, and concluded his national level career as a runner-up in 2012.

=== Suzuka 4 & 8 Hours ===
Pratama won the 2013 Suzuka 4 Hours race together with fellow Indonesian rider Iswandi Muis, both riding a Honda CBR600RR bike from Astra Honda Racing Team. He had also participated in the higher class, Suzuka 8 Hours between 2014 and 2017. He raced for Honda Team Asia, aboard a Honda CBR1000RR together with Australian Joshua Hook and Malaysian Mohamad Zamri Baba in his first participation of the event where the trio finished seventh overall. The 2015 race saw a major change to the team as they replaced Dimas' partners with Azlan Shah Kamaruzaman from Malaysia, and Thai rider Ratthapong Wilairot. They completed the race in the 18th position. For the 2016 event, the team replaced Azlan with Zaqhwan Zaidi and finished eighth, an achievement that was repeated for the following year with the same line-up.

=== Asia Road Racing Championship ===
From the year 2012 to 2016, Pratama raced in Asia Road Racing Championship (ARRC) in the Supersport 600cc class as a full-time rider, also with Astra Honda Racing Team, and a one-off appearance at 2017 Indonesian Round at Sentul which he won the first race. During his time in the class, he earned the Best Rookie of The Year in his first season, having finished the championship in sixth position. His best ranking position ever was fifth in the 2015 season.

=== CEV Moto2 European Championship ===
Between 2015 and 2018, Pratama competed in the FIM CEV Moto2 European Championship with Astra Honda Racing Team. His best overall result was fifth in 2018 season, and a total of two podium finishes in Catalunya race 1 in 2017 season (third) and race 1 Albacete round in 2018 (third).

=== Moto2 World Championship ===
Pratama made his Grand Prix racing debut as a wildcard at the Malaysian GP in 2017 at Sepang International Circuit. Unfortunately, he was unable to finish the race as he was involved in a crash. A year later, at the same circuit, he was called up by Tech 3 to replace their regular rider, Bo Bendsneyder, who was absent due to injury. Pratama completed the race in 23rd position. He also participated in 2018 Catalan motorcycle Grand Prix as a wildcard, where he finished in 24th position.

Pratama secured a full-season contract to race in the 2019 Moto2 season for Hiroshi Aoyama's Idemitsu Honda Team Asia. In Spanish round at Circuito de Jerez, he was accidentally run over by other rider in the beginning of the race after crashing, and did not make restart. Later, during Free Practice 1 for TT Assen, he crashed heavily and suffered concussions where he was confirmed unfit for the race. He participated in the next two rounds, but also withdrew after taking part in the Free Practice sessions.

Pratama was also absent for four rounds due to recovery from his injuries and was replaced by Teppei Nagoe at Red Bull Ring and Silverstone, Andi Farid Izdihar at Misano round, and Gerry Salim at Aragon. He made his comeback after four months absent at Buriram and reached his best result of the season at Sepang as he finished 18th. His contract was not renewed and he was replaced by Farid for 2020 season.

==== Mandalika Racing Team ====
After spending a year without a ride, Pratama was approached by Mandalika Racing Team, a project led by Kemal Nasution and People's Representative Council of Indonesia member Rapsel Ali in aim to contest for 2021 season. The project initially was intended to form a new team in Moto2 class, but eventually switched to become a partner of Stop and Go (SAG) Racing, an existing team. However, Dorna Sports, FIM, and IRTA advised him to compete in CEV Moto2, considering his racing records. The seat in the team was finally filled by Bo Bendsneyder, who had to cancel his newly-signed contract at EAB Racing in World Supersport 600 class in order to join the team. Pratama still served as a reserve rider in the team and had possible wildcard entries. His chance eventually came as he was given a wildcard entry at 2021 Valencian GP. However he crashed on lap 14 and did not finish.

=== Return to CEV Moto2 ===
Being unable to secure his full season Moto2 participation, Pratama raced in 2021 CEV Moto2 with SAG Racing, which marked his comeback to the championship since 2018.

=== Later Career ===
Dimas signed for MS Glow for Men Racing Team, owned by transportation businessman Gilang Widya Pramana to compete in Indonesian national level Mandalika Racing Series. He also participated as a wildcard in 2024 and 2025 Indonesian rounds of Supersport 600 class of ARRC. In 2026, the team fielded him for a full-time ride. Dimas also participated in the first season of Harley-Davidson Bagger World Cup, racing for NitiRacing team, joined by Andrea Iannone and Oscar Gutierrez. He completed the season 10th in the final standings with 60 points.

== Personal life ==
Pratama is married and has two children. His nickname is "Red Forehead". He is endorsed by HJC Helmets since 2021, having previously been associated with KYT his whole career.

== Career statistics ==
=== FIM CEV Moto2 European Championship ===
==== Races by year ====
(key) (Races in bold indicate pole position, races in italics indicate fastest lap)

Year	Bike	1	2	3	4	5	6	7	8	9	10	11	12	Pos	Pts
2014	FTR Moto	JER; 11	ARA1	ARA2	CAT	ALB	NAV1	NAV2	ALG1	ALG2	VAL			27th	5
2015	Kalex	ALG1; 11	ALG2; 29	CAT; 10	ARA1	ARA2	ALB; Ret	NAV1	NAV2	JER; 12	VAL1; 9	VAL2; 9		13th	29
2016	Kalex	VAL1; Ret	VAL2; 15	ARA1; 6	ARA2; 9	CAT1; Ret	CAT2; 8	ALB; 6	ALG1; 5	ALG2; 8	JER; 5	VAL; Ret		7th	66
2017	Kalex	ALB; 6	CAT1; 3	CAT2; 5	VAL1; 14	VAL2; 6	EST1; 7	EST2; Ret	JER; 4	ARA1; 5	ARA2; 5	VAL; 7		6th	102
2018	Kalex	EST1; 4	EST2; 4	VAL; 6	CAT1; 6	CAT2; 13	ARA1; 8	ARA2; DNS	JER; 4	ALB1; 3	ALB2; 5	VAL		5th	91.5
2021	Kalex	EST1; 7	EST2; 8	VAL; 5	CAT1; 6	CAT2; 18	POR1; Ret	POR2; 7	ARA1	ARA2	JER; 8	JER; 9	VAL; 11	9th	67

=== Grand Prix motorcycle racing ===
==== By season ====
Season	Class	Motorcycle	Team	Race	Win	Podium	Pole	FLap	Pts	Plcd
2017	Moto2	Kalex	Federal Oil Gresini Moto2	1	0	0	0	0	0	NC
2018	Moto2	Honda	Astra Honda Racing Team	1	0	0	0	0	0	41st
2018	Moto2	Tech 3	Tech 3 Racing	1	0	0	0	0	0	41st
2019	Moto2	Kalex	Idemitsu Honda Team Asia	11	0	0	0	0	0	34th
2021	Moto2	Kalex	Pertamina Mandalika SAG Team	1	0	0	0	0	0	NC
Total				**15**	**0**	**0**	**0**	**0**	**0**	

==== By class ====
Class	Seasons	1st GP	1st Pod	1st Win	Race	Win	Podiums	Pole	FLap	Pts	WChmp
Moto2	2017–2019, 2021	2017 Malaysia			15	0	0	0	0	0	0
Total	2017–2019, 2021				**15**	**0**	**0**	**0**	**0**	**0**	**0**

==== Races by year ====
(key) (Races in bold indicate pole position; races in italics indicate fastest lap)

Year	Class	Bike	1	2	3	4	5	6	7	8	9	10	11	12	13	14	15	16	17	18	19	Pos	Pts
2017	Moto2	Kalex	QAT	ARG	AME	SPA	FRA	ITA	CAT	NED	GER	CZE	AUT	GBR	RSM	ARA	JPN	AUS	MAL; Ret	VAL		NC	0
2018	Moto2	Honda	QAT	ARG	AME	SPA	FRA	ITA	CAT; 24	NED	GER	CZE	AUT	GBR	RSM	ARA	THA	JPN	AUS			41st	0
2018	Moto2	Tech 3																		MAL; 23	VAL	41st	0
2019	Moto2	Kalex	QAT; 24	ARG; 23	AME; 22	SPA; DNS	FRA; Ret	ITA; 24	CAT; 21	NED; DNS	GER; DNS	CZE; DNS	AUT	GBR	RSM	ARA	THA; 24	JPN; 21	AUS; 26	MAL; 18	VAL; 25	34th	0
2021	Moto2	Kalex	QAT	DOH	POR	SPA	FRA	ITA	CAT	GER	NED	STY	AUT	GBR	ARA	RSM	AME	EMI	ALR	VAL; Ret		NC	0

=== Asia Supersport 600 ===
==== Races by year ====
(key) (Races in bold indicate pole position, races in italics indicate fastest lap)

Year	Bike	1		2		3		4		5		6		Pos	Pts
Year	Bike	R1	R2	R1	R2	R1	R2	R1	R2	R1	R2	R1	R2	Pos	Pts
2024	Honda	CHA	CHA	ZHU	ZHU	MOT	MOT	MAN; Ret	MAN; Ret	SEP	SEP	CHA	CHA	21st	0
2025	Honda	CHA	CHA	SEP	SEP	MOT	MOT	MAN; 9	MAN; Ret	SEP	SEP	CHA	CHA	21st	7
2026	Honda	SEP; 10	SEP; 11	CHA; 9	CHA; 11	MOT; 15	MOT; 14	MAN	MAN	SEP; 10	SEP; 10	CHA	CHA	13th*	38*

=== Mandalika Racing Series ===
==== Races by year ====
(key) (Races in bold indicate pole position; races in italics indicate fastest lap)

Year	Team	Bike	Class	Round 1		Round 2			Round 3			Round 4		Round 5		Pos	Pts
Year	Team	Bike	Class	R1	R2	R1	SP	R2	R1	SP	R2	R1	R2	R1	R2	Pos	Pts
2024	MS Glow For Men Racing Team	Honda	National Sport 600cc	MAN1; 2	MAN2; 5	MAN1; 3		MAN2; 1	MAN1; 7		MAN2; 6	MAN1; 3	MAN2; 5	MAN1; 5	MAN2; 3	N/A	N/A
2025	MS Glow For Men Racing Team	Honda	National Sport 600cc	MAN1; 3	MAN2; 6	MAN; 4	MAN; 3	MAN; 3	MAN; 5	MAN; 3	MAN; 3	MAN; 6	MAN; 6	MAN; Ret	MAN; 5	N/A	N/A

=== Harley-Davidson Bagger World Cup ===
==== Races by year ====
(key) (Races in bold indicate pole position, races in italics indicate fastest lap)

Year	1		2		3		4		5		6		Pos	Pts
Year	R1	R2	R1	R2	R1	R2	R1	R2	R1	R2	R1	R2	Pos	Pts
2026	USA; Ret	USA; 7	ITA; Ret	ITA; 5	NED; 9	NED; 6	GBR; Ret	GBR; Ret	SPA; Ret	SPA; 9	AUT; 7	AUT; 9	10th	60
