= 2018 FIM CEV Moto2 European Championship =

2018 FIM CEV Moto2 European Championship
Previous:	2017	Next:	2019
Support series: FIM CEV Moto3 Junior World Championship; European Talent Cup

The 2018 FIM CEV Moto2 European Championship was the ninth CEV Moto2 season and the fourth under the FIM banner.

== Calendar ==
The following races were scheduled to take place in 2018.

Round	Date	Circuit	Pole position	Fastest lap	Race winner	Winning constructor	Sources
1	25 March	(Portugal) Estoril	(Spain) Augusto Fernández	(Switzerland) Jesko Raffin	(Portugal) Ivo Lopes	(Japan) Yamaha	
1	25 March	(Portugal) Estoril	(Spain) Augusto Fernández	(Germany) Lukas Tulovic	(Switzerland) Jesko Raffin	(Germany) Kalex	
2	29 April	(Spain) Valencia	(Switzerland) Jesko Raffin	(Spain) Edgar Pons	(Switzerland) Jesko Raffin	(Germany) Kalex	
3	10 June	(Spain) Catalunya	(Switzerland) Jesko Raffin	(Spain) Augusto Fernández	(Switzerland) Jesko Raffin	(Germany) Kalex	
3	10 June	(Spain) Catalunya	(Switzerland) Jesko Raffin	(Spain) Edgar Pons	(Spain) Augusto Fernández	(Switzerland) Suter	
4	29 July	(Spain) Aragón	(Spain) Edgar Pons	(Spain) Edgar Pons	(Spain) Edgar Pons	(Germany) Kalex	
4	29 July	(Spain) Aragón	(Spain) Edgar Pons	(Switzerland) Jesko Raffin	(Spain) Edgar Pons	(Germany) Kalex	
5	30 September	(Spain) Jerez	(Spain) Héctor Garzó	(Spain) Edgar Pons	(Spain) Edgar Pons	(Germany) Kalex	
6	14 October	(Spain) Albacete	(Spain) Edgar Pons	(Andorra) Xavier Cardelús	(Spain) Héctor Garzó	(France) Tech 3	
6	14 October	(Spain) Albacete	(Spain) Edgar Pons	(Indonesia) Dimas Ekky Pratama	(Spain) Luis Pomares	(Japan) Kawasaki	
7	25 November	(Spain) Valencia	(Spain) Edgar Pons	(Spain) Edgar Pons	(Spain) Edgar Pons	(Germany) Kalex	

== Entry list ==
Team	Bike	No.	Rider	Rounds
(Switzerland) Swiss Innovative Investors Junior	Kalex	2	(Switzerland) Jesko Raffin	1-6
(Spain) EasyRace Moto2 Team (Spain) EasyRace	Suter	2	(Switzerland) Jesko Raffin	7
(Spain) EasyRace Moto2 Team (Spain) EasyRace	Suter	12	(Australia) Mark Chiodo	4-5
(Spain) EasyRace Moto2 Team (Spain) EasyRace	Suter	73	(Spain) Augusto Fernández	1-3
(Spain) Team Wimu CNS	Tech 3	3	(Germany) Lukas Tulovic	1-6
(Spain) Team Wimu CNS	Tech 3	14	(Spain) Héctor Garzó	All
(Spain) Team Wimu CNS	Tech 3	69	(Spain) Javier Orellana	7
(Italy) Bierreti	GP10	6	(Italy) Giacomo Lorenzon	4, 7
(Italy) Bierreti	Kalex	44	(Italy) Federico Menozzi	1-2
(United Kingdom) Nykos Racing	Nykos	7	(United Kingdom) James Flitcroft	1-2
(United Kingdom) Nykos Racing	Nykos	81	(Netherlands) Nelson Rolfes	7
(France) Promoto Sport	TransFIORmers	9	(France) Corentin Perolari	1-2
(France) Promoto Sport	TransFIORmers	25	(France) Enzo Boulom	3
(Italy) Team Ciatti	Speed Up	10	(Italy) Tommaso Marcon	All
(Spain) Teluru SAG Team	Kalex	17	(Japan) Ikuhiro Enokido	2-3
(Spain) Team Stylobike (Spain) Euvic Stylobike Good Racing	Kalex	18	(Andorra) Xavier Cardelús	1-6
(Spain) Team Stylobike (Spain) Euvic Stylobike Good Racing	Kalex	51	(Italy) Matteo Ciprietti	7
(Spain) Team Stylobike (Spain) Euvic Stylobike Good Racing	Kalex	74	(Poland) Piotr Biesiekirski	4-5, 7
(Japan) Astra Honda Racing Team	Kalex	20	(Indonesia) Dimas Ekky Pratama	1-6
(Germany) Dynavolt Intact GP Junior Team	Kalex	21	(Germany) Matthias Meggle	All
(Germany) Dynavolt Intact GP Junior Team	Kalex	70	(Spain) Marc Alcoba	1, 3-7
(France) Cédric Tangre	Tech3	23	(France) Cédric Tangre	1, 3, 6-7
(Malaysia) Petronas Sprinta SIC Team	Kalex	27	(Malaysia) Adam Norrodin	?
(Spain) AGR Team	Kalex	35	(United States) Benny Solis	All
(Spain) AGR Team	Kalex	57	(Spain) Edgar Pons	All
(Spain) H43 Team Nobby-Talasur	Kalex	46	(Switzerland) Marcel Brenner	All
(Spain) XCTECH Modula	Kalex	61	(Italy) Alessandro Zaccone	All
(Spain) BULL IT	Kalex	77	(Spain) Miquel Pons	All
(United Kingdom) Stuart Stuart	Nykos	91	(United Kingdom) Jack Haverkamp	3
Superstock 600
(Spain) Yamaha Laglisse	Yamaha	4	(Spain) Javier Artime	1-4
(Spain) Yamaha Laglisse	Yamaha	4	(Spain) Daniel Valle	6
(Spain) Yamaha Laglisse	Yamaha	66	(France) Philippe Le Gallo	All
(Spain) Fau55Racing	Yamaha	8	(Italy) Alessandro Zetti	All
(Italy) Marinelli Sniper Team	Yamaha	11	(Spain) Ricardo Soriano	2, 7
(Spain) Reale Avintia Academy77	Yamaha	16	(Spain) Álex Ruiz	5-7
(Spain) BST	Kawasaki	19	(Spain) Alejandro Cánovas	2
(Spain) XCTECH Modula	Yamaha	24	(Australia) Chandler Cooper	All
(Spain) XCTECH Modula	Yamaha	37	(Ukraine) Oleksandr Anin	1-4
(Spain) Champi Women Racing Team-JJSaez Motos Clasicas	Yamaha	26	(Spain) Daniel Sáez	2, 5
(Spain) SGMotoperformance	Yamaha	28	(Spain) Jorge Olmos	1
(Spain) Pinamoto RS	Kawasaki	29	(Spain) Luis Pomares	All
(Spain) Pinamoto RS	Yamaha	67	(Switzerland) Roman Fischer	All
(Spain) Pinamoto RS	Yamaha	99	(Spain) Ángel Lorente	7
(Portugal) ENI-Motor7-Pequeno Motos	Yamaha	75	(Portugal) Ivo Lopes	1
(Qatar) ESSA Racing Team	Kawasaki	80	(Qatar) Nasser Al Malki	5
(Spain) EasyRace Moto2 Team	Yamaha	96	(Spain) David Sanchis	2, 5

== Championship standings ==
Scoring system

Points were awarded to the top fifteen finishers. A rider had to finish the race to earn points.

Position	**1st**	**2nd**	**3rd**	**4th**	**5th**	**6th**	**7th**	**8th**	**9th**	**10th**	**11th**	**12th**	**13th**	**14th**	**15th**
Points	25	20	16	13	11	10	9	8	7	6	5	4	3	2	1

=== Riders' championship ===
Pos.	Rider	Bike	EST (Portugal)		VAL (Spain)	CAT (Spain)		ARA (Spain)		JER (Spain)	ALB (Spain)		VAL (Spain)	Pts
Moto2
1	(Switzerland) Jesko Raffin	Kalex	3	1	**1**	**1**	**2**	2	2	2	5	6		203
1	(Switzerland) Jesko Raffin	Suter											3	203
2	(Spain) Edgar Pons	Kalex	Ret	Ret	2	3	4	**1**	**1**	1	**6**	**4**	**1**	165.5
3	(Spain) Héctor Garzó	Tech 3	8	Ret	4	4	7	3	3	**Ret**	1	8	2	124
4	(Spain) Augusto Fernández	Suter	**2**	**2**	3	2	1							101
5	(Indonesia) Dimas Ekky Pratama	Kalex	4	4	6	6	13	8	DNS	4	3	5		91.5
6	(Italy) Tommaso Marcon	Speed Up	11	9	5	10	5	6	5	3	13	3	DSQ	88
7	(Andorra) Xavier Cardelús	Kalex	Ret	5	11	7	6	12	7	8	2	2		86
8	(Germany) Lukas Tulovic	Tech 3	Ret	3	Ret	5	3	4	Ret	5	4	Ret		80
9	(Spain) Miquel Pons	Kalex	7	8	8	8	Ret	7	6	9	8	12	5	80
10	(Italy) Alessandro Zaccone	Kalex	6	Ret	7	14	9	9	8	6	10	11	4	74.5
11	(Switzerland) Marcel Brenner	Kalex	5	7	10	9	8	10	10	7	DNS	DNS	Ret	62
12	(Spain) Marc Alcoba	Kalex	DNQ	Ret		11	Ret	5	4	Ret	9	7	DSQ	40.5
13	(Portugal) Ivo Lopes	Yamaha	1	6										35
14	(Germany) Matthias Meggle	Kalex	12	Ret	13	13	10	Ret	9	12	DNS	DNS	8	35
15	(United States) Benny Solis	Kalex	16	Ret	14	12	12	DNS	DNS	10	16	9	10	25.5
16	(France) Cédric Tangre	Tech 3	10	10		16	14				14	13	9	24.5
17	(Poland) Piotr Biesiekirski	Kalex						11	11	Ret			7	19
18	(France) Corentin Perolari	Transfiormers	9	11	9									19
19	(Spain) Luis Pomares	Kawasaki	Ret	Ret	18	19	15	17	17	16	15	1	13	17.5
20	(Spain) Daniel Valle	Yamaha									7	10		12
21	(Italy) Alessandro Zetti	Yamaha	13	13	21	20	19	14	13	18	NC	15	16	11.5
22	(Australia) Chandler Cooper	Yamaha	17	Ret	20	18	16	16	14	15	11	14	14	11
23	(Switzerland) Roman Fischer	Yamaha	14	12	19	17	17	15	12	17	17	16	18	11
24	(Spain) Javier Orellana	Tech 3											6	10
25	(Spain) David Sanchis	Yamaha			12					11				9
26	(Spain) Alejandro Ruiz	Yamaha								Ret	12	Ret	12	8
27	(Japan) Ikuhiro Enokido	Kalex			16	15	11							6
28	(Australia) Mark Chiodo	Suter						13	Ret	13				6
29	(Italy) Matteo Ciprietti	Kalex											11	5
30	(Spain) Daniel Sáez	Yamaha			15					14				3
31	(Ukraine) Oleksandr Anin	Yamaha	15	14	22	21	18	Ret	DNS					3
32	(Netherlands) Nelson Rolfes	Nykos											15	1
33	(Italy) Giacomo Lorenzon	GP10						18	15				DNS	1
	(France) Philippe Le Gallo	Yamaha	DNQ	DNQ	24	22	20	19	16	19	Ret	Ret	DNQ	0
	(Spain) Ángel Lorente	Yamaha											17	0
	(Spain) Alejandro Cánovas	Kawasaki			17									0
	(Spain) Ricardo Soriano	Yamaha			23								DNS	0
	(Italy) Federico Menozzi	Kalex	Ret	Ret	DNS									0
	(United Kingdom) James Flitcroft	Nykos	Ret	Ret	DNS									0
	(Spain) Javier Artime	Yamaha	DNQ	DNQ	Ret	DNS	DNS	DNQ	DNQ					0
	(France) Enzo Boulom	Transfiormers				DNS	DNS							0
	(United Kingdom) Jack Haverkamp	Nykos				DNS	DNS							0
	(Qatar) Nasser Al Malki	Kawasaki								DNS				0
	(Spain) Jorge Olmos	Yamaha	DNQ	DNQ										0
Superstock 600
1	(Switzerland) Roman Fischer	Yamaha	3	2	5	1	3	2	1	5	5	5	6	170.5
2	(Australia) Chandler Cooper	Yamaha	5	Ret	6	2	2	3	3	3	2	3	3	153
3	(Italy) Alessandro Zetti	Yamaha	2	3	7	4	5	1	2	6	NC	4	4	143.5
4	(Spain) Luis Pomares	Kawasaki	Ret	Ret	4	3	1	4	5	4	4	1	2	136.5
5	(France) Philippe Le Gallo	Yamaha	DNQ	DNQ	10	6	6	5	4	7	Ret	Ret	DNQ	59
6	(Ukraine) Oleksandr Anin	Yamaha	4	4	8	5	4	Ret	DNS					58
7	(Spain) David Sanchis	Yamaha			1					1				50
8	(Portugal) Ivo Lopes	Yamaha	1	1										50
9	(Spain) Alejandro Ruiz	Yamaha								Ret	3	Ret	1	41
10	(Spain) Daniel Sáez	Yamaha			2					2				40
11	(Spain) Daniel Valle	Yamaha									1	2		35
12	(Spain) Alejandro Cánovas	Kawasaki			3									16
13	(Spain) Ángel Lorente	Yamaha											5	11
14	(Spain) Ricardo Soriano	Yamaha			9								DNS	7
	(Spain) Javier Artime	Yamaha	DNQ	DNQ	Ret	DNS	DNS	DNQ	DNQ					0
	(Qatar) Nasser Al Malki	Kawasaki								DNS				0
	(Spain) Jorge Olmos	Yamaha	DNQ	DNQ										0
Pos.	Rider	Bike	EST (Portugal)		VAL (Spain)	CAT (Spain)		ARA (Spain)		JER (Spain)	ALB (Spain)		VAL (Spain)	Pts

Colour	Result
Gold	Winner
Silver	Second place
Bronze	Third place
Green	Points classification
Blue	Non-points classification
Blue	Non-classified finish (NC)
Purple	Retired, not classified (Ret)
Red	Did not qualify (DNQ)
Red	Did not pre-qualify (DNPQ)
Black	Disqualified (DSQ)
White	Did not start (DNS)
White	Withdrew (WD)
White	Race cancelled (C)
Blank	Did not practice (DNP)
Blank	Did not arrive (DNA)
Blank	Excluded (EX)

**Bold** – Pole position
Italics – Fastest lap

=== Manufacturers' championship ===
Pos.	Manufacturer	EST (Portugal)		VAL (Spain)	CAT (Spain)		ARA (Spain)		JER (Spain)	ALB (Spain)		VAL (Spain)	Points
Moto2
1	(Germany) Kalex	2	1	1	1	2	1	1	1	2	1	1	265
2	(France) Tech 3	Ret	4	2	2	Ret	1	2	2	2	1	2	183
3	(Italy) Speed Up	9	5	3	3	3	4	5	4	4	3	3	148
4	(Austria) KTM	13	14	15	13	6	26	DNS	6	Ret	5	7	48
5	(France) Mistral	10	18	16	19	16	14	Ret		18	Ret	Ret	8
	(United Kingdom) Nykos	16	22	27									0
	(Japan) Honda						Ret	DNS		25	17	DNS	0
Superstock 600
1	(Japan) Yamaha	1	1	1	1	2	1	1	1	1	2	1	255
2	(Japan) Kawasaki	Ret	Ret	3	3	1	4	5	4	4	1	2	139,5
Pos.	Manufacturer	EST (Portugal)		VAL (Spain)	CAT (Spain)		ARA (Spain)		JER (Spain)	ALB (Spain)		VAL (Spain)	Points
