= 2017 Malaysian motorcycle Grand Prix =

(Malaysia) 2017 Malaysian Grand Prix
Race details
- Race 17 of 18 races in the 2017 Grand Prix motorcycle racing season
- Date: 29 October 2017
- Official name: Shell Malaysia Motorcycle Grand Prix
- Location: Sepang International Circuit
- Course: Permanent racing facility; 5.543 km (3.444 mi)

MotoGP
Pole position
Rider	(Spain) Dani Pedrosa	Honda
Time	1:59.212	
Fastest lap
Rider	(Italy) Andrea Dovizioso	Ducati
Time	2:13.084 on lap 13	
Podium
First	(Italy) Andrea Dovizioso	Ducati
Second	(Spain) Jorge Lorenzo	Ducati
Third	(France) Johann Zarco	Yamaha

Moto2
Pole position
Rider	(Italy) Franco Morbidelli	Kalex
Time	2:06.406	
Fastest lap
Rider	(Portugal) Miguel Oliveira	KTM
Time	2:06.952 on lap 8	
Podium
First	(Portugal) Miguel Oliveira	KTM
Second	(South Africa) Brad Binder	KTM
Third	(Italy) Franco Morbidelli	Kalex

Moto3
Pole position
Rider	(Spain) Joan Mir	Honda
Time	2:12.078	
Fastest lap
Rider	(Malaysia) Adam Norrodin	Honda
Time	2:12.775 on lap 3	
Podium
First	(Spain) Joan Mir	Honda
Second	(Spain) Jorge Martín	Honda
Third	(Italy) Enea Bastianini	Honda

The 2017 Malaysian motorcycle Grand Prix was the seventeenth round of the 2017 MotoGP season. It was held at the Sepang International Circuit in Sepang on 29 October 2017.

== Classification ==
=== MotoGP ===
Pos.	No.	Rider	Team	Manufacturer	Laps	Time/Retired	Grid	Points
1	4	(Italy) Andrea Dovizioso	Ducati Team	Ducati	20	44:51.497	3	25
2	99	(Spain) Jorge Lorenzo	Ducati Team	Ducati	20	+0.743	6	20
3	5	(France) Johann Zarco	Monster Yamaha Tech 3	Yamaha	20	+9.738	2	16
4	93	(Spain) Marc Márquez	Repsol Honda Team	Honda	20	+17.763	7	13
5	26	(Spain) Dani Pedrosa	Repsol Honda Team	Honda	20	+29.144	1	11
6	9	(Italy) Danilo Petrucci	Octo Pramac Racing	Ducati	20	+30.380	13	10
7	46	(Italy) Valentino Rossi	Movistar Yamaha MotoGP	Yamaha	20	+30.769	4	9
8	43	(Australia) Jack Miller	EG 0,0 Marc VDS	Honda	20	+35.238	11	8
9	25	(Spain) Maverick Viñales	Movistar Yamaha MotoGP	Yamaha	20	+38.053	5	7
10	44	(Spain) Pol Espargaró	Red Bull KTM Factory Racing	KTM	20	+39.847	12	6
11	19	(Spain) Álvaro Bautista	Pull&Bear Aspar Team	Ducati	20	+42.559	15	5
12	38	(United Kingdom) Bradley Smith	Red Bull KTM Factory Racing	KTM	20	+44.602	16	4
13	45	(United Kingdom) Scott Redding	Octo Pramac Racing	Ducati	20	+48.696	14	3
14	8	(Spain) Héctor Barberá	Reale Avintia Racing	Ducati	20	+50.058	20	2
15	35	(United Kingdom) Cal Crutchlow	LCR Honda	Honda	20	+50.705	10	1
16	60	(Netherlands) Michael van der Mark	Monster Yamaha Tech 3	Yamaha	20	+56.397	22	
17	29	(Italy) Andrea Iannone	Team Suzuki Ecstar	Suzuki	20	+58.391	9	
18	53	(Spain) Tito Rabat	EG 0,0 Marc VDS	Honda	20	+1:25.571	19	
Ret	22	(United Kingdom) Sam Lowes	Aprilia Racing Team Gresini	Aprilia	9	Retired	18	
Ret	17	(Czech Republic) Karel Abraham	Pull&Bear Aspar Team	Ducati	8	Accident	21	
Ret	76	(France) Loris Baz	Reale Avintia Racing	Ducati	5	Accident	17	
DSQ	42	(Spain) Álex Rins	Team Suzuki Ecstar	Suzuki	11	Black flag	8	
Sources:

- Álex Rins was disqualified for taking a shortcut to enter the pit lane following a crash.

=== Moto2 ===
Franco Morbidelli sealed the Moto2 title before the race started on Sunday after Thomas Lüthi was declared unfit and unable to start the race following a qualifying crash that left him with a broken ankle.

Pos.	No.	Rider	Manufacturer	Laps	Time/Retired	Grid	Points
1	44	(Portugal) Miguel Oliveira	KTM	19	40:28.955	2	25
2	41	(South Africa) Brad Binder	KTM	19	+2.387	7	20
3	21	(Italy) Franco Morbidelli	Kalex	19	+6.878	1	16
4	54	(Italy) Mattia Pasini	Kalex	19	+21.774	9	13
5	42	(Italy) Francesco Bagnaia	Kalex	19	+22.086	5	11
6	55	(Malaysia) Hafizh Syahrin	Kalex	19	+23.410	10	10
7	40	(France) Fabio Quartararo	Kalex	19	+23.488	3	9
8	97	(Spain) Xavi Vierge	Tech 3	19	+24.976	13	8
9	32	(Spain) Isaac Viñales	Kalex	19	+25.044	14	7
10	45	(Japan) Tetsuta Nagashima	Kalex	19	+27.199	21	6
11	24	(Italy) Simone Corsi	Speed Up	19	+28.614	16	5
12	37	(Spain) Augusto Fernández	Speed Up	19	+29.125	15	4
13	5	(Italy) Andrea Locatelli	Kalex	19	+31.978	20	3
14	27	(Spain) Iker Lecuona	Kalex	19	+44.346	26	2
15	2	(Switzerland) Jesko Raffin	Kalex	19	+45.088	23	1
16	57	(Spain) Edgar Pons	Kalex	19	+51.358	25	
17	23	(Germany) Marcel Schrötter	Suter	19	+59.328	6	
18	15	(San Marino) Alex de Angelis	Kalex	19	+1:24.767	28	
Ret	7	(Italy) Lorenzo Baldassarri	Kalex	11	Accident	19	
Ret	62	(Italy) Stefano Manzi	Kalex	10	Accident	17	
Ret	49	(Spain) Axel Pons	Kalex	7	Retirement	11	
Ret	26	(Indonesia) Dimas Ekky Pratama	Kalex	1	Accident	27	
Ret	87	(Australia) Remy Gardner	Tech 3	1	Accident	24	
Ret	73	(Spain) Álex Márquez	Kalex	1	Accident	4	
Ret	30	(Japan) Takaaki Nakagami	Kalex	0	Accident	8	
Ret	11	(Germany) Sandro Cortese	Suter	0	Accident	12	
Ret	10	(Italy) Luca Marini	Kalex	0	Accident	18	
Ret	89	(Malaysia) Khairul Idham Pawi	Kalex	0	Accident	22	
DNS	12	(Switzerland) Thomas Lüthi	Kalex		Injury		
WD	6	(United Kingdom) Tarran Mackenzie	Suter		Withdrew		
WD	77	(Switzerland) Dominique Aegerter	Suter		Withdrew		
OFFICIAL MOTO2 REPORT

- Thomas Lüthi did not start the race following a crash at the end of qualifying that left him injured, whilst both Kiefer Racing riders Tarran Mackenzie and Dominique Aegerter withdrew following the death of team boss Stefan Kiefer on October 27.

=== Moto3 ===
Pos.	No.	Rider	Manufacturer	Laps	Time/Retired	Grid	Points
1	36	(Spain) Joan Mir	Honda	18	40:14.545	1	25
2	88	(Spain) Jorge Martín	Honda	18	+0.724	2	20
3	33	(Italy) Enea Bastianini	Honda	18	+0.763	8	16
4	11	(Belgium) Livio Loi	Honda	18	+6.868	6	13
5	17	(United Kingdom) John McPhee	Honda	18	+11.051	3	11
6	16	(Italy) Andrea Migno	KTM	18	+11.090	19	10
7	5	(Italy) Romano Fenati	Honda	18	+11.238	7	9
8	44	(Spain) Arón Canet	Honda	18	+11.671	12	8
9	21	(Italy) Fabio Di Giannantonio	Honda	18	+11.959	11	7
10	64	(Netherlands) Bo Bendsneyder	KTM	18	+12.062	4	6
11	7	(Malaysia) Adam Norrodin	Honda	18	+12.572	15	5
12	71	(Japan) Ayumu Sasaki	Honda	18	+13.581	14	4
13	58	(Spain) Juan Francisco Guevara	KTM	18	+14.885	18	3
14	19	(Argentina) Gabriel Rodrigo	KTM	18	+18.736	5	2
15	96	(Italy) Manuel Pagliani	Mahindra	18	+21.986	20	1
16	65	(Germany) Philipp Öttl	KTM	18	+23.365	24	
17	42	(Spain) Marcos Ramírez	KTM	18	+23.524	17	
18	41	(Thailand) Nakarin Atiratphuvapat	Honda	18	+25.908	27	
19	12	(Italy) Marco Bezzecchi	Mahindra	18	+26.173	26	
20	27	(Japan) Kaito Toba	Honda	18	+40.612	21	
21	84	(Czech Republic) Jakub Kornfeil	Peugeot	18	+40.772	22	
22	14	(Italy) Tony Arbolino	Honda	18	+43.110	28	
23	4	(Finland) Patrik Pulkkinen	Peugeot	18	+1:00.918	30	
24	6	(Spain) María Herrera	Mahindra	18	+1:01.104	31	
Ret	9	(Malaysia) Kasma Daniel	Honda	17	Accident	29	
Ret	48	(Italy) Lorenzo Dalla Porta	Mahindra	16	Accident	23	
Ret	8	(Italy) Nicolò Bulega	KTM	15	Retirement	16	
Ret	23	(Italy) Niccolò Antonelli	KTM	8	Accident	10	
Ret	95	(France) Jules Danilo	Honda	5	Accident	9 (Note: 3-place grid penalty.)	
Ret	40	(South Africa) Darryn Binder	KTM	3	Accident	25	
Ret	24	(Japan) Tatsuki Suzuki	Honda	1	Retirement	13	
OFFICIAL MOTO3 REPORT

== Championship standings after the race ==
=== MotoGP ===
Below are the standings for the top five riders and constructors after round seventeen has concluded.

Riders' Championship standings

Pos.	Rider	Points
1	(Spain) Marc Márquez	282
2	(Italy) Andrea Dovizioso	261
3	(Spain) Maverick Viñales	226
4	(Italy) Valentino Rossi	197
5	(Spain) Dani Pedrosa	185

Constructors' Championship standings

Pos.	Constructor	Points
1	(Japan) Honda	332
2	(Italy) Ducati	303
3	(Japan) Yamaha	301
4	(Japan) Suzuki	87
5	(Italy) Aprilia	64

- Note: Only the top five positions are included for both sets of standings.

=== Moto2 ===
Pos.	Rider	Points
1	(Italy) Franco Morbidelli	288
2	(Switzerland) Thomas Lüthi	243
3	(Portugal) Miguel Oliveira	216
4	(Spain) Álex Márquez	190
5	(Italy) Francesco Bagnaia	161
6	(Italy) Mattia Pasini	148
7	(Japan) Takaaki Nakagami	128
8	(Italy) Simone Corsi	110
9	(South Africa) Brad Binder	109
10	(Spain) Xavi Vierge	98

=== Moto3 ===
Pos.	Rider	Points
1	(Spain) Joan Mir	321
2	(Italy) Romano Fenati	235
3	(Spain) Arón Canet	192
4	(Spain) Jorge Martín	171
5	(Italy) Fabio Di Giannantonio	153
6	(Italy) Enea Bastianini	130
7	(United Kingdom) John McPhee	123
8	(Italy) Andrea Migno	118
9	(Spain) Marcos Ramírez	107
10	(Germany) Philipp Öttl	104

== Notes ==
Previous race: 2017 Australian Grand Prix	FIM Grand Prix World Championship; 2017 season	Next race: 2017 Valencian Grand Prix
Previous race: 2016 Malaysian Grand Prix	Malaysian motorcycle Grand Prix	Next race: 2018 Malaysian Grand Prix
