= 2019 Australian motorcycle Grand Prix =

(Australia) 2019 Australian Grand Prix
Race details
- Race 17 of 19 races in the 2019 Grand Prix motorcycle racing season
- Date: 27 October 2019
- Official name: Pramac-Generac Australian Motorcycle Grand Prix
- Location: Phillip Island Grand Prix Circuit, Phillip Island, Victoria, Australia
- Course: Permanent racing facility; 4.448 km (2.764 mi)

MotoGP
Pole position
Rider	(Spain) Maverick Viñales	Yamaha
Time	1:28.492	
Fastest lap
Rider	(Spain) Maverick Viñales	Yamaha
Time	1:29.322 on lap 13	
Podium
First	(Spain) Marc Márquez	Honda
Second	(United Kingdom) Cal Crutchlow	Honda
Third	(Australia) Jack Miller	Ducati

Moto2
Pole position
Rider	(Spain) Jorge Navarro	Speed Up
Time	1:33.565	
Fastest lap
Rider	(Switzerland) Thomas Lüthi	Kalex
Time	1.32.609 on lap 4	
Podium
First	(South Africa) Brad Binder	KTM
Second	(Spain) Jorge Martín	KTM
Third	(Switzerland) Thomas Lüthi	Kalex

Moto3
Pole position
Rider	(Spain) Marcos Ramírez	Honda
Time	1:38.976	
Fastest lap
Rider	(Italy) Romano Fenati	Honda
Time	1:37.139 on lap 11	
Podium
First	(Italy) Lorenzo Dalla Porta	Honda
Second	(Spain) Marcos Ramírez	Honda
Third	(Spain) Albert Arenas	KTM

The 2019 Australian motorcycle Grand Prix was the seventeenth round of the 2019 MotoGP season. It was held at the Phillip Island Grand Prix Circuit in Phillip Island on 27 October 2019.

Lorenzo Dalla Porta clinched the title in the Moto3 category after securing his third win of the season. The 22-year old Italian also took advantage of an early crash of his main rival Arón Canet on lap 3 to eliminate any remaining hopes of the Spaniard winning the championship. With two races remaining, Dalla Porta headed to the penultimate round in Sepang with a comfortable lead in the standings by a further 72 points ahead of Canet in 2nd place.

As of 2025, Dalla Porta is the first and only Italian rider to win the lightweight class title since its introduction in 2012.

== Classification ==
=== MotoGP ===
Pos.	No.	Rider	Team	Manufacturer	Laps	Time/Retired	Grid	Points
1	93	(Spain) Marc Márquez	Repsol Honda Team	Honda	27	40:43.729	3	25
2	35	(United Kingdom) Cal Crutchlow	LCR Honda Castrol	Honda	27	+11.413	6	20
3	43	(Australia) Jack Miller	Pramac Racing	Ducati	27	+14.499	9	16
4	63	(Italy) Francesco Bagnaia	Pramac Racing	Ducati	27	+14.554	15	13
5	36	(Spain) Joan Mir	Team Suzuki Ecstar	Suzuki	27	+14.817	13	11
6	29	(Italy) Andrea Iannone	Aprilia Racing Team Gresini	Aprilia	27	+15.280	8	10
7	4	(Italy) Andrea Dovizioso	Ducati Team	Ducati	27	+15.294	10	9
8	46	(Italy) Valentino Rossi	Monster Energy Yamaha MotoGP	Yamaha	27	+15.841	4	8
9	42	(Spain) Álex Rins	Team Suzuki Ecstar	Suzuki	27	+16.032	12	7
10	41	(Spain) Aleix Espargaró	Aprilia Racing Team Gresini	Aprilia	27	+16.590	7	6
11	21	(Italy) Franco Morbidelli	Petronas Yamaha SRT	Yamaha	27	+24.145	11	5
12	44	(Spain) Pol Espargaró	Red Bull KTM Factory Racing	KTM	27	+26.654	17	4
13	5	(France) Johann Zarco	LCR Honda Idemitsu	Honda	27	+26.758	14	3
14	17	(Czech Republic) Karel Abraham	Reale Avintia Racing	Ducati	27	+44.912	16	2
15	55	(Malaysia) Hafizh Syahrin	Red Bull KTM Tech3	KTM	27	+44.968	20	1
16	99	(Spain) Jorge Lorenzo	Repsol Honda Team	Honda	27	+1:06.045	19	
Ret	12	(Spain) Maverick Viñales	Monster Energy Yamaha MotoGP	Yamaha	26	Accident	1	
Ret	82	(Finland) Mika Kallio	Red Bull KTM Factory Racing	KTM	24	Rear Tyre Wear	18	
Ret	53	(Spain) Tito Rabat	Reale Avintia Racing	Ducati	3	Rider In Pain	21	
Ret	20	(France) Fabio Quartararo	Petronas Yamaha SRT	Yamaha	0	Accident	2	
Ret	9	(Italy) Danilo Petrucci	Ducati Team	Ducati	0	Accident	5	
DNS	88	(Portugal) Miguel Oliveira	Red Bull KTM Tech3	KTM		Did not start		
Sources:

- Miguel Oliveira crashed in FP4 and was declared unfit to compete.

=== Moto2 ===
Pos.	No.	Rider	Manufacturer	Laps	Time/Retired	Grid	Points
1	41	(South Africa) Brad Binder	KTM	25	38:53.277	2	25
2	88	(Spain) Jorge Martín	KTM	25	+1.968	5	20
3	12	(Switzerland) Thomas Lüthi	Kalex	25	+6.021	10	16
4	9	(Spain) Jorge Navarro	Speed Up	25	+8.151	1	13
5	7	(Italy) Lorenzo Baldassarri	Kalex	25	+8.806	18	11
6	87	(Australia) Remy Gardner	Kalex	25	+8.955	13	10
7	27	(Spain) Iker Lecuona	KTM	25	+9.455	9	9
8	73	(Spain) Álex Márquez	Kalex	25	+10.055	6	8
9	62	(Italy) Stefano Manzi	MV Agusta	25	+10.699	12	7
10	45	(Japan) Tetsuta Nagashima	Kalex	25	+11.132	15 (Note: 3-place grid penalty.)	6
11	23	(Germany) Marcel Schrötter	Kalex	25	+14.353	20	5
12	11	(Italy) Nicolò Bulega	Kalex	25	+14.641	11	4
13	2	(Switzerland) Jesko Raffin	NTS	25	+18.541	7	3
14	21	(Italy) Fabio Di Giannantonio	Speed Up	25	+20.255	4	2
15	64	(Netherlands) Bo Bendsneyder	NTS	25	+29.238	19	1
16	16	(United States) Joe Roberts	KTM	25	+30.870	21	
17	33	(Italy) Enea Bastianini	Kalex	25	+31.031	17	
18	5	(Italy) Andrea Locatelli	Kalex	25	+31.764	22	
19	40	(Spain) Augusto Fernández	Kalex	25	+33.324	16	
20	22	(United Kingdom) Sam Lowes	Kalex	25	+37.341	32 (Note: Back of the grid start penalty.)	
21	96	(United Kingdom) Jake Dixon	KTM	25	+37.392	24	
22	65	(Germany) Philipp Öttl	KTM	25	+1:09.178	25	
23	47	(Malaysia) Adam Norrodin	Kalex	25	+1:10.717	29	
24	3	(Germany) Lukas Tulovic	KTM	25	+1:11.606	30	
25	18	(Andorra) Xavi Cardelús	KTM	25	+1:12.066	28	
26	20	(Indonesia) Dimas Ekky Pratama	Kalex	25	+1:21.622	31	
27	77	(Switzerland) Dominique Aegerter	MV Agusta	24	+1 lap	23	
Ret	35	(Thailand) Somkiat Chantra	Kalex	14	Accident	27	
Ret	97	(Spain) Xavi Vierge	Kalex	3	Accident	14	
Ret	54	(Italy) Mattia Pasini	Kalex	3	Retired	26	
Ret	10	(Italy) Luca Marini	Kalex	0	Accident	3	
Ret	72	(Italy) Marco Bezzecchi	KTM	0	Accident	8	
OFFICIAL MOTO2 REPORT

=== Moto3 ===
Pos.	No.	Rider	Manufacturer	Laps	Time/Retired	Grid	Points
1	48	(Italy) Lorenzo Dalla Porta	Honda	23	37:45.817	6	25
2	42	(Spain) Marcos Ramírez	Honda	23	+0.077	1	20
3	75	(Spain) Albert Arenas	KTM	23	+0.088	3	16
4	24	(Japan) Tatsuki Suzuki	Honda	23	+0.126	12	13
5	17	(United Kingdom) John McPhee	Honda	23	+0.330	4	11
6	40	(South Africa) Darryn Binder	KTM	23	+0.772	26	10
7	71	(Japan) Ayumu Sasaki	Honda	23	+1.029	21	9
8	69	(United Kingdom) Tom Booth-Amos	KTM	23	+1.545	14	8
9	14	(Italy) Tony Arbolino	Honda	23	+1.635	13	7
10	82	(Italy) Stefano Nepa	KTM	23	+2.023	28 (Note: 12-place grid penalty.)	6
11	7	(Italy) Dennis Foggia	KTM	23	+2.340	10	5
12	55	(Italy) Romano Fenati	Honda	23	+3.723	8	4
13	21	(Spain) Alonso López	Honda	23	+7.564	29	3
14	79	(Japan) Ai Ogura	Honda	23	+7.676	22	2
15	84	(Czech Republic) Jakub Kornfeil	KTM	23	+8.109	27 (Note: 9-place grid penalty.)	1
16	61	(Turkey) Can Öncü	KTM	23	+16.735	16	
17	22	(Japan) Kazuki Masaki	KTM	23	+16.744	17	
18	76	(Kazakhstan) Makar Yurchenko	KTM	23	+42.326	23	
19	15	(New Zealand) Rogan Chandler	Kalex KTM	22	+1 lap	25	
Ret	5	(Spain) Jaume Masiá	KTM	22	Accident	15	
Ret	13	(Italy) Celestino Vietti	KTM	22	Accident	9	
Ret	27	(Japan) Kaito Toba	Honda	20	Accident	5	
Ret	16	(Italy) Andrea Migno	KTM	20	Accident	7	
Ret	25	(Spain) Raúl Fernández	KTM	17	Accident Damage	20	
Ret	12	(Czech Republic) Filip Salač	KTM	15	Accident Damage	19	
Ret	19	(Argentina) Gabriel Rodrigo	Honda	15	Accident	11	
Ret	11	(Spain) Sergio García	Honda	13	Accident	18	
Ret	9	(Australia) Yanni Shaw	Kalex KTM	3	Retired	30	
Ret	44	(Spain) Arón Canet	KTM	2	Accident	2	
Ret	54	(Italy) Riccardo Rossi	Honda	0	Accident	24	
DNS	23	(Italy) Niccolò Antonelli	Honda		Did not start		
OFFICIAL MOTO3 REPORT

- Niccolò Antonelli withdrew from the event due to shoulder pain from a crash in qualifying.

== Championship standings after the race ==
=== MotoGP ===
Pos.	Rider	Points
1	(Spain) Marc Márquez	375
2	(Italy) Andrea Dovizioso	240
3	(Spain) Álex Rins	183
4	(Spain) Maverick Viñales	176
5	(Italy) Danilo Petrucci	169
6	(France) Fabio Quartararo	163
7	(Italy) Valentino Rossi	153
8	(Australia) Jack Miller	141
9	(United Kingdom) Cal Crutchlow	133
10	(Italy) Franco Morbidelli	105

=== Moto2 ===
Pos.	Rider	Points
1	(Spain) Álex Márquez	242
2	(Switzerland) Thomas Lüthi	214
3	(South Africa) Brad Binder	209
4	(Spain) Jorge Navarro	199
5	(Spain) Augusto Fernández	192
6	(Italy) Luca Marini	176
7	(Italy) Lorenzo Baldassarri	162
8	(Germany) Marcel Schrötter	130
9	(Italy) Fabio Di Giannantonio	101
10	(Italy) Enea Bastianini	95

=== Moto3 ===
Pos.	Rider	Points
1	(Italy) Lorenzo Dalla Porta	254
2	(Spain) Arón Canet	182
3	(Italy) Tony Arbolino	168
4	(Spain) Marcos Ramírez	164
5	(United Kingdom) John McPhee	147
6	(Italy) Niccolò Antonelli	122
7	(Italy) Celestino Vietti	116
8	(Japan) Tatsuki Suzuki	111
9	(Spain) Jaume Masiá	105
10	(Spain) Albert Arenas	104

== Notes ==
Previous race: 2019 Japanese Grand Prix	FIM Grand Prix World Championship; 2019 season	Next race: 2019 Malaysian Grand Prix
Previous race: 2018 Australian Grand Prix	Australian motorcycle Grand Prix	Next race: 2022 Australian Grand Prix
