= 2018 Catalan motorcycle Grand Prix =

(Catalonia) 2018 Catalan Grand Prix
Race details
- Race 7 of 19 races in the 2018 Grand Prix motorcycle racing season
- Date: 17 June 2018
- Official name: Gran Premi Monster Energy de Catalunya
- Location: Circuit de Barcelona-Catalunya, Montmeló, Spain
- Course: Permanent racing facility; 4.627 km (2.875 mi)

MotoGP
Pole position
Rider	(Spain) Jorge Lorenzo	Ducati
Time	1:38.680	
Fastest lap
Rider	(Spain) Jorge Lorenzo	Ducati
Time	1:40.021 on lap 9	
Podium
First	(Spain) Jorge Lorenzo	Ducati
Second	(Spain) Marc Márquez	Honda
Third	(Italy) Valentino Rossi	Yamaha

Moto2
Pole position
Rider	(France) Fabio Quartararo	Speed Up
Time	1:43.474	
Fastest lap
Rider	(France) Fabio Quartararo	Speed Up
Time	1:43.956 on lap 14	
Podium
First	(France) Fabio Quartararo	Speed Up
Second	(Portugal) Miguel Oliveira	KTM
Third	(Spain) Álex Márquez	Kalex

Moto3
Pole position
Rider	(Italy) Enea Bastianini	Honda
Time	1:48.806	
Fastest lap
Rider	(Spain) Jaume Masiá	KTM
Time	1:49.005 on lap 4	
Podium
First	(Italy) Enea Bastianini	Honda
Second	(Italy) Marco Bezzecchi	KTM
Third	(Argentina) Gabriel Rodrigo	KTM

The 2018 Catalan motorcycle Grand Prix was the seventh round of the 2018 Grand Prix motorcycle racing season. It was held at the Circuit de Barcelona-Catalunya in Montmeló on 17 June 2018.

== Classification ==
=== MotoGP ===
Pos.	No.	Rider	Team	Manufacturer	Laps	Time/Retired	Grid	Points
1	99	(Spain) Jorge Lorenzo	Ducati Team	Ducati	24	40:13.566	1	25
2	93	(Spain) Marc Márquez	Repsol Honda Team	Honda	24	+4.479	2	20
3	46	(Italy) Valentino Rossi	Movistar Yamaha MotoGP	Yamaha	24	+6.098	7	16
4	35	(United Kingdom) Cal Crutchlow	LCR Honda Castrol	Honda	24	+9.805	10	13
5	26	(Spain) Dani Pedrosa	Repsol Honda Team	Honda	24	+10.640	11	11
6	25	(Spain) Maverick Viñales	Movistar Yamaha MotoGP	Yamaha	24	+10.798	4	10
7	5	(France) Johann Zarco	Monster Yamaha Tech 3	Yamaha	24	+13.432	8	9
8	9	(Italy) Danilo Petrucci	Alma Pramac Racing	Ducati	24	+15.055	6	8
9	19	(Spain) Álvaro Bautista	Ángel Nieto Team	Ducati	24	+22.057	22	7
10	29	(Italy) Andrea Iannone	Team Suzuki Ecstar	Suzuki	24	+24.141	5	6
11	44	(Spain) Pol Espargaró	Red Bull KTM Factory Racing	KTM	24	+36.560	18	5
12	45	(United Kingdom) Scott Redding	Aprilia Racing Team Gresini	Aprilia	24	+38.229	20	4
13	17	(Czech Republic) Karel Abraham	Ángel Nieto Team	Ducati	24	+1:21.526	21	3
14	21	(Italy) Franco Morbidelli	EG 0,0 Marc VDS	Honda	21	+3 laps	17	2
Ret	55	(Malaysia) Hafizh Syahrin	Monster Yamaha Tech 3	Yamaha	20	Accident	14	
Ret	53	(Spain) Tito Rabat	Reale Avintia Racing	Ducati	18	Fire	9	
Ret	43	(Australia) Jack Miller	Alma Pramac Racing	Ducati	17	Mechanical	13	
Ret	38	(United Kingdom) Bradley Smith	Red Bull KTM Factory Racing	KTM	13	Collision	16	
Ret	30	(Japan) Takaaki Nakagami	LCR Honda Idemitsu	Honda	13	Collision	12	
Ret	42	(Spain) Álex Rins	Team Suzuki Ecstar	Suzuki	11	Electrics	15	
Ret	4	(Italy) Andrea Dovizioso	Ducati Team	Ducati	8	Accident	3	
Ret	10	(Belgium) Xavier Siméon	Reale Avintia Racing	Ducati	7	Accident	26	
Ret	41	(Spain) Aleix Espargaró	Aprilia Racing Team Gresini	Aprilia	4	Accident	19 (Note: 3-place grid penalty.)	
Ret	12	(Switzerland) Thomas Lüthi	EG 0,0 Marc VDS	Honda	3	Accident	24	
Ret	50	(France) Sylvain Guintoli	Team Suzuki Ecstar	Suzuki	2	Accident	25	
Ret	36	(Finland) Mika Kallio	Red Bull KTM Factory Racing	KTM	0	Accident	23	

=== Moto2 ===
Pos.	No.	Rider	Manufacturer	Laps	Time/Retired	Grid	Points
1	20	(France) Fabio Quartararo	Speed Up	22	38:22.059	1	25
2	44	(Portugal) Miguel Oliveira	KTM	22	+2.492	17	20
3	73	(Spain) Álex Márquez	Kalex	22	+3.485	2	16
4	23	(Germany) Marcel Schrötter	Kalex	22	+4.398	3	13
5	97	(Spain) Xavi Vierge	Kalex	22	+4.687	7	11
6	41	(South Africa) Brad Binder	KTM	22	+7.637	5	10
7	7	(Italy) Lorenzo Baldassarri	Kalex	22	+7.724	10	9
8	42	(Italy) Francesco Bagnaia	Kalex	22	+10.611	4	8
9	22	(United Kingdom) Sam Lowes	KTM	22	+13.909	9	7
10	27	(Spain) Iker Lecuona	KTM	22	+15.124	14	6
11	5	(Italy) Andrea Locatelli	Kalex	22	+15.983	16	5
12	24	(Italy) Simone Corsi	Kalex	22	+16.405	11	4
13	45	(Japan) Tetsuta Nagashima	Kalex	22	+18.995	12	3
14	40	(Spain) Augusto Fernández	Kalex	22	+20.241	20	2
15	87	(Australia) Remy Gardner	Tech 3	22	+20.409	23	1
16	57	(Spain) Edgar Pons	Kalex	22	+24.538	18	
17	10	(Italy) Luca Marini	Kalex	22	+27.609	13	
18	4	(South Africa) Steven Odendaal	NTS	22	+28.226	25	
19	89	(Malaysia) Khairul Idham Pawi	Kalex	22	+28.640	22	
20	77	(Switzerland) Dominique Aegerter	KTM	22	+29.217	24	
21	52	(United Kingdom) Danny Kent	Speed Up	22	+30.295	27	
22	16	(United States) Joe Roberts	NTS	22	+37.600	28	
23	95	(France) Jules Danilo	Kalex	22	+38.649	33	
24	30	(Indonesia) Dimas Ekky Pratama	Honda	22	+44.604	30	
25	51	(Brazil) Eric Granado	Suter	22	+49.491	32	
Ret	32	(Spain) Isaac Viñales	Kalex	18	Accident Damage	21	
Ret	13	(Italy) Romano Fenati	Kalex	16	Handling	15	
Ret	54	(Italy) Mattia Pasini	Kalex	14	Accident	6	
Ret	36	(Spain) Joan Mir	Kalex	12	Accident	8	
Ret	21	(Italy) Federico Fuligni	Kalex	12	Retired	34	
Ret	9	(Spain) Jorge Navarro	Kalex	7	Accident Damage	19	
Ret	64	(Netherlands) Bo Bendsneyder	Tech 3	0	Accident	26	
Ret	66	(Finland) Niki Tuuli	Kalex	0	Accident	29	
Ret	62	(Italy) Stefano Manzi	Suter	0	Accident	31	
OFFICIAL MOTO2 REPORT

=== Moto3 ===
Pos.	No.	Rider	Manufacturer	Laps	Time/Retired	Grid	Points
1	33	(Italy) Enea Bastianini	Honda	21	38:36.883	1	25
2	12	(Italy) Marco Bezzecchi	KTM	21	+0.167	9	20
3	19	(Argentina) Gabriel Rodrigo	KTM	21	+0.170	8	16
4	17	(United Kingdom) John McPhee	KTM	21	+0.257	7	13
5	24	(Japan) Tatsuki Suzuki	Honda	21	+0.639	3	11
6	27	(Japan) Kaito Toba	Honda	21	+6.801	6	10
7	21	(Italy) Fabio Di Giannantonio	Honda	21	+6.872	13	9
8 (Note: 2-place penalty.)	72	(Spain) Alonso López	Honda	21	+6.600	27 (Note: 12-place grid penalty.)	8
9	10	(Italy) Dennis Foggia	KTM	21	+7.315	25	7
10	25	(Spain) Raúl Fernández	KTM	21	+7.507	15	6
11	84	(Czech Republic) Jakub Kornfeil	KTM	21	+7.638 (Note: 1.6-second penalty.)	14	5
12	76	(Kazakhstan) Makar Yurchenko	KTM	21	+8.263 (Note: 1.2-second penalty.)	23	4
13	7	(Malaysia) Adam Norrodin	Honda	21	+15.256	21	3
14	41	(Thailand) Nakarin Atiratphuvapat	Honda	21	+26.621	26	2
15	11	(Belgium) Livio Loi	KTM	21	+28.559 (Note: 1.9-second penalty.)	28	1
16	65	(Germany) Philipp Öttl	KTM	21	+32.980	18	
17	48	(Italy) Lorenzo Dalla Porta	Honda	19	+2 laps (Note: 1.8-second penalty.)	10	
Ret	5	(Spain) Jaume Masiá	KTM	17	Collision	17	
Ret	16	(Italy) Andrea Migno	KTM	17	Collision	16	
Ret	44	(Spain) Arón Canet	Honda	15	Collision	5	
Ret	8	(Italy) Nicolò Bulega	KTM	15	Collision	12	
Ret	75	(Spain) Albert Arenas	KTM	15	Collision	19	
Ret	14	(Italy) Tony Arbolino	Honda	15	Rider In Pain	22	
Ret	71	(Japan) Ayumu Sasaki	Honda	15	Accident Damage	4	
Ret	42	(Spain) Marcos Ramírez	KTM	14	Accident Damage	24	
Ret	88	(Spain) Jorge Martín	Honda	8	Accident	2	
Ret	22	(Japan) Kazuki Masaki	KTM	4	Accident	11	
Ret	40	(South Africa) Darryn Binder	KTM	0	Accident	20	
DNS	77	(Spain) Vicente Pérez	KTM		Did not start		
DNS	23	(Italy) Niccolò Antonelli	Honda		Did not start		
OFFICIAL MOTO3 REPORT

- Niccolò Antonelli suffered a dislocated shoulder in crash during practice and was declared unfit to start the race.

== Championship standings after the race ==
=== MotoGP ===
Pos.	Rider	Points
1	(Spain) Marc Márquez	115
2	(Italy) Valentino Rossi	88
3	(Spain) Maverick Viñales	77
4	(France) Johann Zarco	73
5	(Italy) Danilo Petrucci	71
6	(United Kingdom) Cal Crutchlow	69
7	(Spain) Jorge Lorenzo	66
8	(Italy) Andrea Dovizioso	66
9	(Italy) Andrea Iannone	66
10	(Australia) Jack Miller	49

=== Moto2 ===
Pos.	Rider	Points
1	(Italy) Francesco Bagnaia	119
2	(Portugal) Miguel Oliveira	118
3	(Spain) Álex Márquez	94
4	(Italy) Lorenzo Baldassarri	93
5	(Spain) Xavi Vierge	70
6	(Spain) Joan Mir	64
7	(Italy) Mattia Pasini	58
8	(South Africa) Brad Binder	57
9	(Germany) Marcel Schrötter	50
10	(France) Fabio Quartararo	45

=== Moto3 ===
Pos.	Rider	Points
1	(Italy) Marco Bezzecchi	103
2	(Italy) Fabio Di Giannantonio	84
3	(Spain) Jorge Martín	80
4	(Italy) Enea Bastianini	68
5	(Spain) Arón Canet	61
6	(Argentina) Gabriel Rodrigo	57
7	(Italy) Andrea Migno	56
8	(Italy) Niccolò Antonelli	44
9	(Czech Republic) Jakub Kornfeil	41
10	(Spain) Marcos Ramírez	38

== Notes ==
Previous race: 2018 Italian Grand Prix	FIM Grand Prix World Championship; 2018 season	Next race: 2018 Dutch TT
Previous race: 2017 Catalan Grand Prix	Catalan motorcycle Grand Prix	Next race: 2019 Catalan Grand Prix
