= Khairul Idham Pawi =

Malaysian motorcycle racer (born 1998)

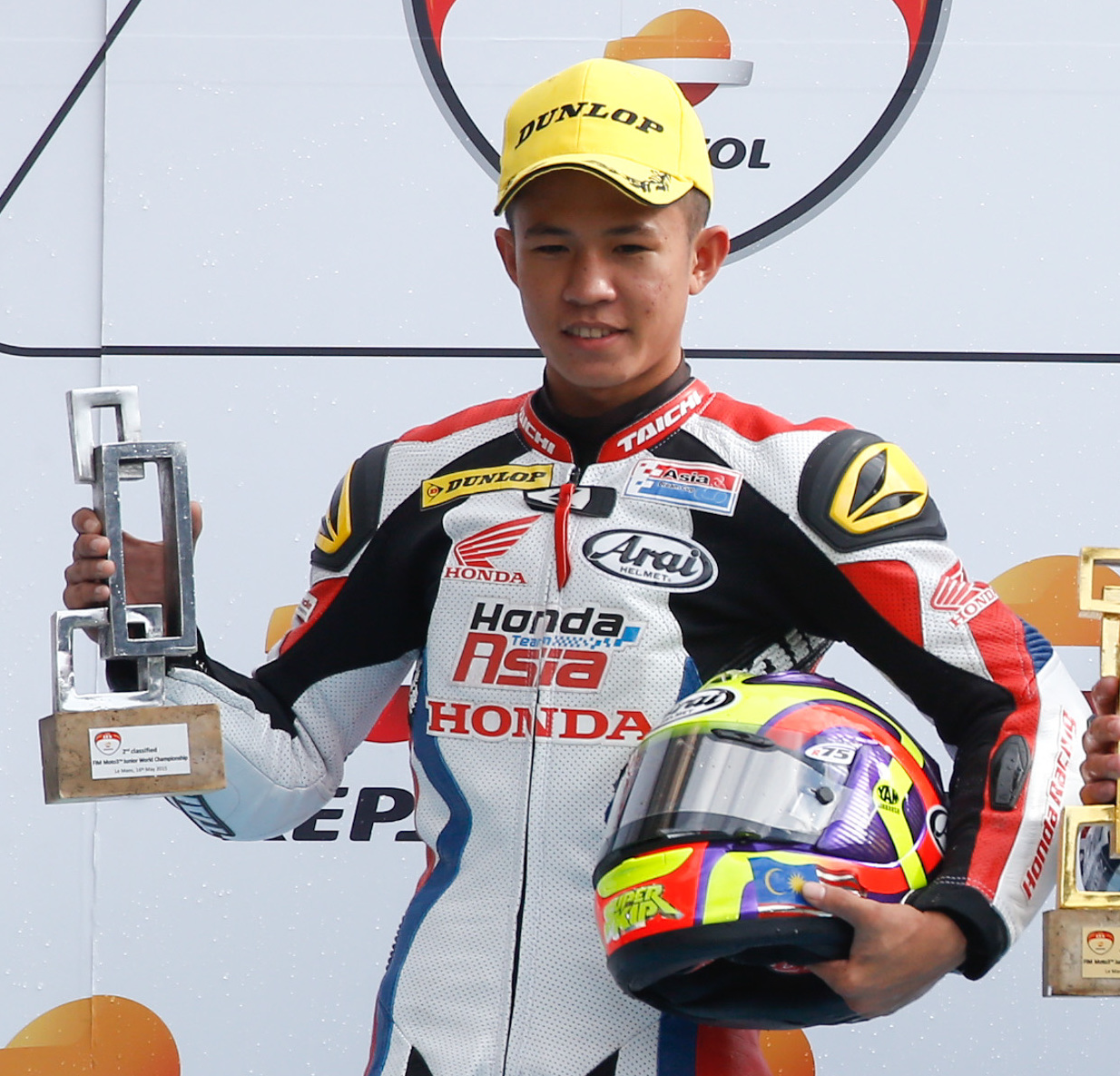
- Pawi in 2015
- Nationality: Malaysian
- Born: 20 September 1998 (age 28); Kampung Gajah, Perak, Malaysia
- Bike number: 89
Motorcycle racing career statistics
Moto2 World Championship
Active years	2017–2019, 2024
Manufacturers	Kalex
Championships	0
2024 championship position	NC (0 pts)
Starts / Wins / Podiums / Poles / F. laps / Points; 39 / 0 / 0 / 0 / 0 / 14
Moto3 World Championship
Active years	2015–2016, 2020
Manufacturers	Honda
Championships	0
2020 championship position	32nd (0 pts)
Starts / Wins / Podiums / Poles / F. laps / Points; 32 / 2 / 2 / 0 / 1 / 62
Supersport World Championship
Active years	2023–
Manufacturers	Honda
Championships	0
2024 championship position	37th (3 pts)
Starts / Wins / Podiums / Poles / F. laps / Points; 26 / 0 / 0 / 0 / 0 / 3

Khairul Idham Pawi (born 20 September 1998) is a Malaysian motorcycle racer. He is the youngest non-European to win a Grand Prix, accomplishing this feat in the Argentine race of the 2016 Moto3 World Championship, aged just 17. He won the Honda Future One-Make Challenge in 2012 and the 2014 Malaysian Cub Prix in the Wira class.

== Career ==
=== Moto3 World Championship ===
Pawi made his Grand Prix debut as wildcard at the 2015 Aragon motorcycle Grand Prix, entered by Honda Team Asia, where he finished the race in 25th place.

In 2016, Pawi made his full-time debut in the 2016 Moto3 World Championship, once again riding the Honda of Honda Team Asia, alongside Japanese rider Hiroki Ono. Pawi won the second Grand Prix of the season in a wet Argentina race, becoming the youngest non-European rider to win a race, aged 17. Later in the season at the German Grand Prix, Pawi started from only 20th on the grid, but established himself as a wet-weather specialist, as he charged through to lead after just six laps. He took the win by over 11 seconds from Andrea Locatelli, moving up to tenth in the rider's standings. He finished the year 19th in the championship, with 62 points.

=== Moto2 World Championship ===
Following his two victories, for the 2017 Moto2 World Championship Pawi was promoted to partner Takaaki Nakagami in Idemitsu Honda Team Asia, replacing Ratthapark Wilairot in the Moto2 category. In just his second year in Grand Prix motorcycle racing, Pawi struggled to adjust to the bigger and faster bikes, scoring points in only two races during the season, finishing 27th in the standings, with ten points.

Pawi stayed with Honda Asia Team for the 2018 Moto2 World Championship, this time partnered by Tetsuta Nagashima. Pawi had his worst season yet, only scoring one point during the season, a 15th place finish in France.

For the 2019 Moto2 World Championship, Pawi started off with a 13th place finish in Argentina, before suffering a Grade 3 open fracture of his little finger, in a crash during Friday practice at the 2019 Spanish motorcycle Grand Prix. He returned at the 2019 Czech Republic motorcycle Grand Prix but withdrew after the Friday practice sessions due to the injury and missed the rest of the season. He finished the season 30th and last in the standings, having only completed three races, and amassing three points in an injury-riddled season.

=== Second Moto3 World Championship stint ===
After being replaced in Moto2 by Somkiat Chantra, Pawi returned to Moto3 for the 2020 season, but struggled on the smaller bikes, and scored no points during the year.

In May 2021, following no offers from motorcycle grand prix racing teams, Pawi announced his surprise retirement, aged only 22.

=== Malaysian Superbike Championship ===
In 2021, Pawi made a comeback from retirement to join the TKKR Racing team for the remainder of the 2021 Malaysian superbike races, picking up two podiums, including a win. He finished the season in fourth place (out of nine riders) with 72 points.

=== Asia Road Racing Championship ===
==== Boon Siew Honda Malaysia ====
After a winning result, back in Malaysia Superbike, Pawi joined Boon Siew Honda Malaysia to race in Supersport Category partnering up with Azroy Hakeem Anuar and Helmi Azman riding the latest Honda CBR-600RR.

== Career statistics ==
=== Pre-Grand Prix career highlights ===
2012–11th, Malaysian Cub Prix WIRA Championship #45 Honda
2013–7th, Malaysian Cub Prix WIRA Championship #26 Honda
2013–4th, Asia Dream Cup #10 Honda CBR250R
2014–1st, Malaysian Cub Prix WIRA Championship #28 Honda
2014–1st, Asia Dream Cup #1 Honda CBR250R
2015–6th, FIM CEV Moto3 Junior World Championship #98 Honda NSF250R
2016-19th, FIM Moto3 World Championship #89 Honda Team Asia
2017-27th, FIM Moto2 World Championship #89 Honda Team Asia

=== FIM CEV Moto3 Junior World Championship ===
==== Races by year ====
(key) (Races in bold indicate pole position, races in italics indicate fastest lap)

Year	Bike	1	2	3	4	5	6	7	8	9	10	11	12	Pos	Pts
2015	TSR Honda	ALG; 9												6th	99
2015	Honda		LMS; 2	CAT1; 2	CAT2; 3	ARA1; 9	ARA2; 6	ALB; 7	NAV; 12	JER1; Ret	JER2; 16	VAL1; 10	VAL2; 18	6th	99

=== Grand Prix motorcycle racing ===
==== By season ====
Season	Class	Motorcycle	Team	Race	Win	Podium	Pole	FLap	Pts	Plcd
2015	Moto3	Honda	Honda Team Asia	1	0	0	0	0	0	NC
2016	Moto3	Honda	Honda Team Asia	18	2	2	0	1	62	19th
2017	Moto2	Kalex	Idemitsu Honda Team Asia	18	0	0	0	0	10	27th
2018	Moto2	Kalex	Idemitsu Honda Team Asia	18	0	0	0	0	1	30th
2019	Moto2	Kalex	Petronas Sprinta Racing	3	0	0	0	0	3	30th
2020	Moto3	Honda	Petronas Sprinta Racing	13	0	0	0	0	0	32nd
2024	Moto2	Kalex	Petronas MIE Racing RW	0	0	0	0	0	0	NC
Total				**71**	**2**	**2**	**0**	**1**	**76**	

==== By class ====
Class	Seasons	1st GP	1st Pod	1st Win	Race	Win	Podiums	Pole	FLap	Pts	WChmp
Moto3	2015–2016, 2020	2015 Aragon	2016 Argentina	2016 Argentina	32	2	2	0	1	62	0
Moto2	2017–2019, 2024	2017 Qatar			39	0	0	0	0	14	0
2015–2020, 2024					**71**	**2**	**2**	**0**	**1**	**76**	**0**

==== Races by year ====
(key) (Races in bold indicate pole position; races in italics indicate fastest lap)

Year	Class	Bike	1	2	3	4	5	6	7	8	9	10	11	12	13	14	15	16	17	18	19	20	Pos	Pts
2015	Moto3	Honda	QAT	AME	ARG	SPA	FRA	ITA	CAT	NED	GER	IND	CZE	GBR	RSM	ARA; 25	JPN	AUS	MAL	VAL			NC	0
2016	Moto3	Honda	QAT; 22	ARG; 1	AME; 20	SPA; 14	FRA; 14	ITA; Ret	CAT; Ret	NED; Ret	GER; 1	AUT; 27	CZE; Ret	GBR; 22	RSM; 22	ARA; 22	JPN; 19	AUS; Ret	MAL; 8	VAL; 25			19th	62
2017	Moto2	Kalex	QAT; 28	ARG; 24	AME; 25	SPA; Ret	FRA; 22	ITA; 26	CAT; 25	NED; 26	GER; 20	CZE; 14	AUT; 17	GBR; 28	RSM; 8	ARA; Ret	JPN; 23	AUS; 21	MAL; Ret	VAL; 25			27th	10
2018	Moto2	Kalex	QAT; 23	ARG; 24	AME; 25	SPA; 18	FRA; 15	ITA; 18	CAT; 19	NED; 19	GER; 17	CZE; 20	AUT; 16	GBR; C	RSM; 22	ARA; 27	THA; 21	JPN; 22	AUS; 16	MAL; 17	VAL; Ret		30th	1
2019	Moto2	Kalex	QAT; 17	ARG; 13	AME; 17	SPA; DNS	FRA	ITA	CAT	NED	GER	CZE; WD	AUT	GBR	RSM	ARA	THA	JPN	AUS	MAL	VAL		30th	3
2020	Moto3	Honda	QAT; 26	SPA; 22	AND; 20	CZE; 22	AUT; DNS	STY	RSM; 21	EMI; 24	CAT; 24	FRA; 19	ARA; 27	TER; 27	EUR; 22	VAL; Ret	POR; 28						32nd	0
2024	Moto2	Kalex	QAT	POR	AME	SPA	FRA	CAT	ITA	NED	GER	GBR	AUT	CAT	RSM	EMI	INA	JPN	AUS	THA	MAL; DNS	SLD	NC	0

=== ARRC Supersports 600 Championship ===
==== Races by year ====
(key) (Races in bold indicate pole position; races in italics indicate fastest lap)

Year	Bike	1		2		3		4		5		6		Pos	Pts
Year	Bike	R1	R2	R1	R2	R1	R2	R1	R2	R1	R2	R1	R2	Pos	Pts
2022	Honda	CHA; 5	CHA; 5	SEP; 2	SEP; 3	SUG; 12	SUG; 9	SEP; 8	SEP; 5	CHA; 8	CHA; 12			6th	97
2023	Honda	**CHA**; 1	**CHA**; 2	**SEP**; 2	**SEP**; 1	SUG; 13	SUG; 1	MAN; 2	MAN; 8	ZHU; 4	ZHU; 12	CHA; 3	CHA; 10	2nd	185
2025	Honda	CHA; 13	CHA; 7	SEP; 5	SEP; 2	MOT; 6	MOT; Ret	MAN; Ret	MAN; 4	SEP; 7	SEP; 10	CHA; 12	CHA; 14	10th	98
2026	Honda	**SEP**; Ret	**SEP**; 8	CHA; 12	CHA; 9	MOT; 8	MOT; 8	MAN	MAN	SEP	SEP	CHA	CHA	11th*	35*

=== Supersport World Championship ===
==== Races by year ====
(key) (Races in bold indicate pole position, races in italics indicate fastest lap)

Year	Bike	1		2		3		4		5		6		7		8		9		10		11		12		Pos	Pts
Year	Bike	R1	R2	R1	R2	R1	R2	R1	R2	R1	R2	R1	R2	R1	R2	R1	R2	R1	R2	R1	R2	R1	R2	R1	R2	Pos	Pts
2023	Honda	AUS	AUS	INA	INA	NED	NED	SPA	SPA	ITA	ITA	GBR	GBR	ITA	ITA	CZE	CZE	FRA	FRA	SPA	SPA	POR	POR	SPA; 21	SPA; 19	NC	0
2024	Honda	AUS; 15	AUS; 23	SPA; 28	SPA; 29	NED; 23	NED; 20	ITA; 21	ITA; 24	GBR; 25	GBR; 23	CZE; 22	CZE; Ret	POR; Ret	POR; 19	FRA; 15	FRA; 29	ITA; Ret	ITA; 26	SPA; 21	SPA; 26	POR; 18	POR; 17	SPA; 15	SPA; 19	37th	3

* Season still in progress.

=== Suzuka 8 Hours results ===
Year	Class	Team	Co-riders	Bike	Pos
2025	**EWC**	(Japan) Honda Suzuka Racing Team	(Japan) Kai Aota (Japan) Yuki Sugiyama	Honda CBR1000RR-R SP	14th
2026	**EWC**	(Japan) Honda Asia-Dream Racing with Astemo	(Thailand) Nakarin Atiratphuvapat (Indonesia) Adenanta Putra	Honda CBR1000RR-R	TBD
