= Tetsuta Nagashima =

Japanese motorcycle racer

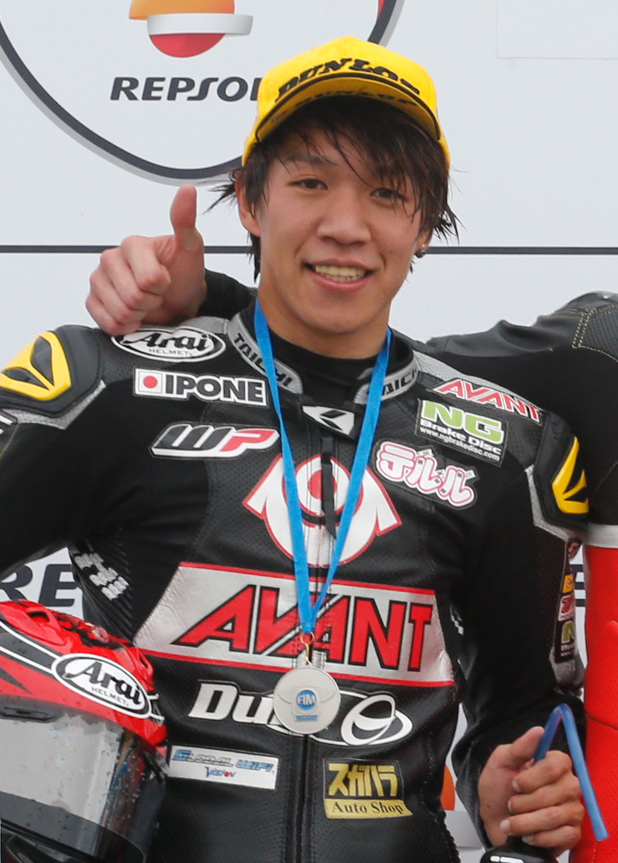
- Nagashima in 2016
- Nationality: Japanese
- Born: 2 July 1992 (age 34); Kanagawa, Japan
- Current team: Dunlop Racing Team
- Bike number: 45
Motorcycle racing career statistics
MotoGP World Championship
Active years	2022
Manufacturers	Honda
Championships	0
2022 championship position	29th (0 pts)
Starts / Wins / Podiums / Poles / F. laps / Points; 4 / 0 / 0 / 0 / 0 / 0
Moto2 World Championship
Active years	2013–2014, 2016–2021
Manufacturers	Motobi, TSR, NTS, Kalex
Championships	0
2021 championship position	29th (5 pts)
Starts / Wins / Podiums / Poles / F. laps / Points; 87 / 1 / 2 / 1 / 2 / 217
Superbike World Championship
Active years	2022, 2024–
Manufacturers	Honda
Championships	0
2026 championship position	22nd (7 pts)
Starts / Wins / Podiums / Poles / F. laps / Points; 15 / 0 / 0 / 0 / 0 / 23

Tetsuta Nagashima (Japanese: 長島 哲太, Hepburn: Nagashima Tetsuta; born 2 July 1992) is a Japanese Grand Prix motorcycle racer who competes in the JSB1000 class of the All Japan Road Race Championship for Dunlop Racing Team, aboard a Honda CBR1000RR-R SP. He was the All Japan GP-Mono champion in 2011.

Nagashima has competed in the Moto2 World Championship in 2014, and between 2017 and 2020. He is a race winner of the same category, having clinched the 2020 Qatar motorcycle Grand Prix. Nagashima has also raced in MotoGP in 2022, as replacement rider. He is currently an HRC test rider and occasionally wildcards in the Superbike World Championship.

== Career statistics ==
=== FIM CEV Moto2 European Championship ===
==== Races by year ====
(key) (Races in bold indicate pole position, races in italics indicate fastest lap)

Year	Bike	1	2	3	4	5	6	7	8	9	10	11	Pos	Pts
2015	Kalex	ALG1; 7	ALG2; 6	CAT; 5	ARA1; 6	ARA2; 8	ALB; 13	NAV1; 5	NAV2; 7	JER; 2	VAL1; Ret	VAL2; 3	7th	107
2016	Kalex	VAL1; Ret	VAL2; DNS	ARA1; 2	ARA2; 3	**CAT1**; 3	**CAT2**; 4	ALB; 2	**ALG1**; 2	**ALG2**; 3	JER; 3	VAL; 1	2nd	162

=== Grand Prix motorcycle racing ===
==== By season ====
Season	Class	Motorcycle	Team	Race	Win	Podium	Pole	FLap	Pts	Plcd
2013	Moto2	Motobi	JiR Moto2	1	0	0	0	0	0	NC
2014	Moto2	TSR	Teluru Team JiR Webike	11	0	0	0	0	0	NC
2014	Moto2	NTS	Teluru Team JiR Webike	1	0	0	0	0	0	NC
2016	Moto2	Kalex	Ajo Motorsport Academy	2	0	0	0	0	2	32nd
2017	Moto2	Kalex	Teluru SAG Team	18	0	0	0	0	14	26th
2018	Moto2	Kalex	Idemitsu Honda Team Asia	17	0	0	0	0	27	20th
2019	Moto2	Kalex	ONEXOX TKKR SAG Team	19	0	0	1	0	78	14th
2020	Moto2	Kalex	Red Bull KTM Ajo	15	1	2	0	2	91	8th
2021	Moto2	Kalex	Italtrans Racing Team	3	0	0	0	0	5	29th
2022	MotoGP	Honda	Team HRC	1	0	0	0	0	0	29th
2022	MotoGP	Honda	LCR Honda Idemitsu	3	0	0	0	0	0	29th
Total				**91**	**1**	**2**	**1**	**2**	**217**	

==== By class ====
Class	Seasons	1st GP	1st pod	1st win	Race	Win	Podiums	Pole	FLap	Pts	WChmp
Moto2	2013–2014, 2016–2021	2013 Japan	2020 Qatar	2020 Qatar	87	1	2	1	2	217	0
MotoGP	2022	2022 Japan			4	0	0	0	0	0	0
Total	2013–2014, 2016–2022				**91**	**1**	**2**	**1**	**2**	**217**	**0**

==== Races by year ====
(key) (Races in bold indicate pole position, races in italics indicate fastest lap)

Year	Class	Bike	1	2	3	4	5	6	7	8	9	10	11	12	13	14	15	16	17	18	19	20	Pos	Pts
2013	Moto2	Motobi	QAT	AME	SPA	FRA	ITA	CAT	NED	GER	INP	CZE	GBR	RSM	ARA	MAL	AUS	JPN; 20	VAL				NC	0
2014	Moto2	TSR	QAT; 21	AME; 20	ARG; 31	SPA; 22	FRA; Ret	ITA; 28	CAT; 23	NED; 20	GER; 22	INP; 23	CZE; Ret	GBR; DNS	RSM	ARA	JPN	AUS	MAL				NC	0
2014	Moto2	NTS																		VAL; 26			NC	0
2016	Moto2	Kalex	QAT	ARG	AME	SPA	FRA	ITA	CAT	NED	GER	AUT	CZE	GBR	RSM	ARA; 23	JPN; 14	AUS	MAL	VAL			32nd	2
2017	Moto2	Kalex	QAT; 19	ARG; 19	AME; 19	SPA; 15	FRA; 21	ITA; 24	CAT; 26	NED; 21	GER; 18	CZE; 17	AUT; 12	GBR; 19	RSM; 13	ARA; 18	JPN; 20	AUS; 18	MAL; 10	VAL; 26			26th	14
2018	Moto2	Kalex	QAT; 21	ARG; 17	AME; 19	SPA; 13	FRA; 25	ITA; Ret	CAT; 13	NED; DNS	GER; Ret	CZE; 16	AUT; 15	GBR; C	RSM; Ret	ARA; 15	THA; 8	JPN; 12	AUS; 13	MAL; Ret	VAL; 12		20th	27
2019	Moto2	Kalex	QAT; Ret	ARG; 12	AME; 12	SPA; 7	FRA; 11	ITA; 14	CAT; 10	NED; 5	GER; 12	CZE; 9	**AUT**; Ret	GBR; 5	RSM; Ret	ARA; Ret	THA; 15	JPN; Ret	AUS; 10	MAL; 8	VAL; 21		14th	78
2020	Moto2	Kalex	QAT; 1	SPA; 2	ANC; 11	CZE; 11	AUT; Ret	STY; 4	RSM; Ret	EMI; 23	CAT; 12	FRA; 21	ARA; 9	TER; 14	EUR; 12	VAL; 12	POR; 14						8th	91
2021	Moto2	Kalex	QAT	DOH	POR	SPA	FRA	ITA	CAT	GER	NED	STY	AUT	GBR	ARA	RSM	AME; 16	EMI	ALR; 21	VAL; 11			29th	5
2022	MotoGP	Honda	QAT	INA	ARG	AME	POR	SPA	FRA	ITA	CAT	GER	NED	GBR	AUT	RSM	ARA	JPN; Ret	THA; 22	AUS; 19	MAL; Ret	VAL	29th	0

=== Superbike World Championship ===
==== Races by year ====
(key) (Races in bold indicate pole position) (Races in italics indicate fastest lap)

Year	Bike	1			2			3			4			5			6			7			8			9			10			11			12			Pos	Pts
Year	Bike	R1	SR	R2	R1	SR	R2	R1	SR	R2	R1	SR	R2	R1	SR	R2	R1	SR	R2	R1	SR	R2	R1	SR	R2	R1	SR	R2	R1	SR	R2	R1	SR	R2	R1	SR	R2	Pos	Pts
2022	Honda	SPA	SPA	SPA	NED	NED	NED	POR	POR	POR	ITA	ITA	ITA	GBR	GBR	GBR	CZE	CZE	CZE	FRA	FRA	FRA	SPA	SPA	SPA	POR	POR	POR	ARG	ARG	ARG	INA	INA	INA	AUS; 10	AUS; 19	AUS; 9	21st	13
2024	Honda	AUS	AUS	AUS	SPA	SPA	SPA	NED	NED	NED	ITA	ITA	ITA	GBR	GBR	GBR	CZE	CZE	CZE	POR	POR	POR	FRA	FRA	FRA	ITA	ITA	ITA	SPA	SPA	SPA	POR	POR	POR	SPA; 15	SPA; 19	SPA; 16	28th	1
2025	Honda	AUS; 14	AUS; Ret	AUS; 18	POR	POR	POR	NED	NED	NED	ITA	ITA	ITA	CZE	CZE	CZE	EMI	EMI	EMI	GBR	GBR	GBR	HUN	HUN	HUN	FRA	FRA	FRA	ARA	ARA	ARA	POR; 16	POR; 16	POR; 17	SPA	SPA	SPA	25th	2
2026	Honda	AUS; 14	AUS; 17	AUS; 11	POR	POR	POR	NED	NED	NED	HUN	HUN	HUN	CZE	CZE	CZE	ARA	ARA	ARA	EMI	EMI	EMI	GBR	GBR	GBR	FRA	FRA	FRA	ITA	ITA	ITA	POR	POR	POR	SPA	SPA	SPA	22nd	7

* Season still in progress.

=== Asia Road Racing Championship ===
==== Races by year ====
(key) (Races in bold indicate pole position, races in italics indicate fastest lap)

Year	Bike	1		2		3		4		5		6		Pos	Pts
Year	Bike	R1	R2	R1	R2	R1	R2	R1	R2	R1	R2	R1	R2	Pos	Pts
2024	Honda	CHA	CHA	ZHU	ZHU	MOT	MOT	MAN	MAN	SEP	SEP	CHA; 6	CHA; 2	13th	30

=== Suzuka 8 Hours ===
Year	Class	Team	Co-riders	Bike	Pos
2022	**EWC**	(Japan) Team HRC	(Spain) Iker Lecuona (Japan) Takumi Takahashi	Honda CBR1000RR-R SP	1st
2023	**EWC**	(Japan) Team HRC	(Spain) Xavi Vierge (Japan) Takumi Takahashi	Honda CBR1000RR-R SP	1st
2026	**SST**	(Japan) NCXX Racing with Riders Club	(Japan) Yudai Kamei (Japan) Yuta Date	Honda CBR1000RR-R	1st

=== All Japan Road Race Championship ===
==== Races by year ====
(key) (Races in bold indicate pole position; races in italics indicate fastest lap)

Year	Class	Bike	1	2	3	4	5	6	7	8	9	10	11	Pos	Pts
2024	JSB1000	Honda	**SUZ**; 4	MOT1; 6	MOT2; 6	SUG1; 10	SUG2; 10	MOT; Ret	AUT1; Ret	AUT2; 7	OKA; 10	SUZ1; 11	SUZ2; Ret	10th	68
2025	JSB1000	Honda	MOT; Ret	SUG1; 7	SUG2; 7	MOT1; 12	MOT2; 4	AUT1; 7	AUT2; 6	OKA; 3	SUZ1; 14	SUZ2; 9		8th	85
2026	JSB1000	Honda	MOT; 2	SUG1; 4	SUG2; 3	AUT1; 3	AUT2; 3	MOT1; 5	MOT2; 2	OKA; 1	**SUZ1**; 3	**SUZ2**; 15		3rd	160
