= 2018 Austrian motorcycle Grand Prix =

(Austria) 2018 Austrian Grand Prix
Race details
- Race 11 of 19 races in the 2018 Grand Prix motorcycle racing season
- Date: 12 August 2018
- Official name: Eyetime Motorrad Grand Prix von Österreich
- Location: Red Bull Ring, Spielberg, Styria, Austria
- Course: Permanent racing facility; 4.318 km (2.683 mi)

MotoGP
Pole position
Rider	(Spain) Marc Márquez	Honda
Time	1:23.241	
Fastest lap
Rider	(Italy) Andrea Dovizioso	Ducati
Time	1:24.277 on lap 8	
Podium
First	(Spain) Jorge Lorenzo	Ducati
Second	(Spain) Marc Márquez	Honda
Third	(Italy) Andrea Dovizioso	Ducati

Moto2
Pole position
Rider	(Italy) Francesco Bagnaia	Kalex
Time	1:29.409	
Fastest lap
Rider	(South Africa) Brad Binder	KTM
Time	1:30.157 on lap 11	
Podium
First	(Italy) Francesco Bagnaia	Kalex
Second	(Portugal) Miguel Oliveira	KTM
Third	(Italy) Luca Marini	Kalex

Moto3
Pole position
Rider	(Italy) Marco Bezzecchi	KTM
Time	1:38.617	
Fastest lap
Rider	(Italy) Lorenzo Dalla Porta	Honda
Time	1:36.307 on lap 20	
Podium
First	(Italy) Marco Bezzecchi	KTM
Second	(Italy) Enea Bastianini	Honda
Third	(Spain) Jorge Martín	Honda

The 2018 Austrian motorcycle Grand Prix was the eleventh round of the 2018 MotoGP season. It was held at the Red Bull Ring in Spielberg on 12 August 2018. The victory would prove to be Jorge Lorenzo's last in MotoGP, as well as his final podium finish.

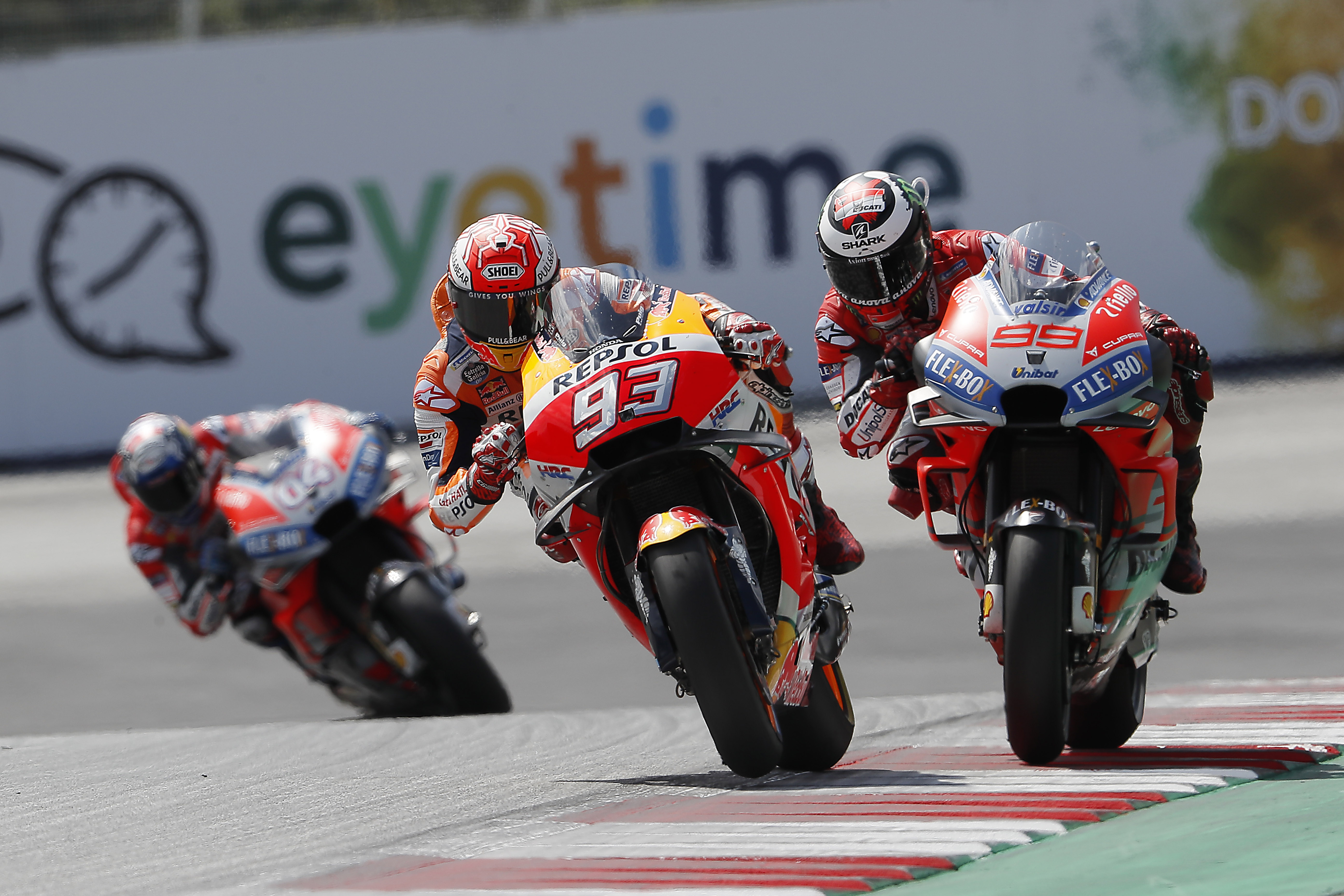
Marc Márquez and Jorge Lorenzo, battling for the lead, with Andrea Dovizioso in the back in the MotoGP race. Lorenzo went on to win, with Márquez and Dovizioso finishing second and third.

== Classification ==
=== MotoGP ===
Pos.	No.	Rider	Team	Manufacturer	Laps	Time/Retired	Grid	Points
1	99	(Spain) Jorge Lorenzo	Ducati Team	Ducati	28	39:40.688	3	25
2	93	(Spain) Marc Márquez	Repsol Honda Team	Honda	28	+0.130	1	20
3	4	(Italy) Andrea Dovizioso	Ducati Team	Ducati	28	+1.656	2	16
4	35	(United Kingdom) Cal Crutchlow	LCR Honda Castrol	Honda	28	+9.434	5	13
5	9	(Italy) Danilo Petrucci	Alma Pramac Racing	Ducati	28	+13.169	4	11
6	46	(Italy) Valentino Rossi	Movistar Yamaha MotoGP	Yamaha	28	+14.026	14	10
7	26	(Spain) Dani Pedrosa	Repsol Honda Team	Honda	28	+14.156	9	9
8	42	(Spain) Álex Rins	Team Suzuki Ecstar	Suzuki	28	+16.644	10	8
9	5	(France) Johann Zarco	Monster Yamaha Tech 3	Yamaha	28	+20.760	6	7
10	19	(Spain) Álvaro Bautista	Ángel Nieto Team	Ducati	28	+20.844	12	6
11	53	(Spain) Tito Rabat	Reale Avintia Racing	Ducati	28	+21.114	7	5
12	25	(Spain) Maverick Viñales	Movistar Yamaha MotoGP	Yamaha	28	+22.939	11	4
13	29	(Italy) Andrea Iannone	Team Suzuki Ecstar	Suzuki	28	+26.523	8	3
14	38	(United Kingdom) Bradley Smith	Red Bull KTM Factory Racing	KTM	28	+29.168	13	2
15	30	(Japan) Takaaki Nakagami	LCR Honda Idemitsu	Honda	28	+30.072	21	1
16	55	(Malaysia) Hafizh Syahrin	Monster Yamaha Tech 3	Yamaha	28	+30.343	17	
17	41	(Spain) Aleix Espargaró	Aprilia Racing Team Gresini	Aprilia	28	+31.775	15	
18	43	(Australia) Jack Miller	Alma Pramac Racing	Ducati	28	+34.375	16	
19	21	(Italy) Franco Morbidelli	EG 0,0 Marc VDS	Honda	28	+40.171	19 (Note: 3-place grid penalty.)	
20	45	(United Kingdom) Scott Redding	Aprilia Racing Team Gresini	Aprilia	28	+53.020	20	
21	17	(Czech Republic) Karel Abraham	Ángel Nieto Team	Ducati	28	+53.261	23	
22	12	(Switzerland) Thomas Lüthi	EG 0,0 Marc VDS	Honda	28	+54.355	22	
Ret	10	(Belgium) Xavier Siméon	Reale Avintia Racing	Ducati	10	Accident	18	

=== Moto2 ===
Pos.	No.	Rider	Manufacturer	Laps	Time/Retired	Grid	Points
1	42	(Italy) Francesco Bagnaia	Kalex	25	37:45.914	1	25
2	44	(Portugal) Miguel Oliveira	KTM	25	+0.264	2	20
3	10	(Italy) Luca Marini	Kalex	25	+5.953	10	16
4	54	(Italy) Mattia Pasini	Kalex	25	+6.114	6	13
5	9	(Spain) Jorge Navarro	Kalex	25	+8.554	4	11
6	41	(South Africa) Brad Binder	KTM	25	+8.944	8	10
7	23	(Germany) Marcel Schrötter	Kalex	25	+9.126	7	9
8	36	(Spain) Joan Mir	Kalex	25	+12.404	20	8
9	20	(France) Fabio Quartararo	Speed Up	25	+16.250	3	7
10	27	(Spain) Iker Lecuona	KTM	25	+16.718	12	6
11	13	(Italy) Romano Fenati	Kalex	25	+16.829	15	5
12	52	(United Kingdom) Danny Kent	Speed Up	25	+17.716	17	4
13	5	(Italy) Andrea Locatelli	Kalex	25	+23.200	14	3
14	62	(Italy) Stefano Manzi	Suter	25	+27.944	23	2
15	45	(Japan) Tetsuta Nagashima	Kalex	25	+27.994	22	1
16	89	(Malaysia) Khairul Idham Pawi	Kalex	25	+28.493	21	
17	77	(Switzerland) Dominique Aegerter	KTM	25	+29.043	19	
18	4	(South Africa) Steven Odendaal	NTS	25	+38.176	25	
19	16	(United States) Joe Roberts	NTS	25	+40.544	24	
20	95	(France) Jules Danilo	Kalex	25	+41.655	26	
21	66	(Finland) Niki Tuuli	Kalex	25	+41.727	28	
22	64	(Netherlands) Bo Bendsneyder	Tech 3	25	+42.766	27	
23	32	(Spain) Isaac Viñales	Suter	25	+43.811	29	
24	55	(Spain) Alejandro Medina	Kalex	25	+45.372	30	
25	18	(Andorra) Xavi Cardelús	Kalex	25	+51.185	31	
26	7	(Italy) Lorenzo Baldassarri	Kalex	25	+1:13.901	9	
Ret	73	(Spain) Álex Márquez	Kalex	24	Accident	5	
Ret	22	(United Kingdom) Sam Lowes	KTM	17	Accident	16	
Ret	21	(Italy) Federico Fuligni	Kalex	17	Shoulder Pain	32	
Ret	24	(Italy) Simone Corsi	Kalex	3	Accident	18	
Ret	87	(Australia) Remy Gardner	Tech 3	3	Accident	11	
Ret	40	(Spain) Augusto Fernández	Kalex	3	Accident	13	
DNS	97	(Spain) Xavi Vierge	Kalex		Did not start		
OFFICIAL MOTO2 REPORT

- Xavi Vierge suffered a broken wrist in a collision with Steven Odendaal during qualifying and was declared unfit to start the race.

=== Moto3 ===
Pos.	No.	Rider	Manufacturer	Laps	Time/Retired	Grid	Points
1	12	(Italy) Marco Bezzecchi	KTM	23	37:13.198	1	25
2	33	(Italy) Enea Bastianini	Honda	23	+0.473	9	20
3	88	(Spain) Jorge Martín	Honda	23	+0.544	2	16
4	75	(Spain) Albert Arenas	KTM	23	+1.373	3	13
5	48	(Italy) Lorenzo Dalla Porta	Honda	23	+1.421	11	11
6	5	(Spain) Jaume Masiá	KTM	23	+1.519	12	10
7	71	(Japan) Ayumu Sasaki	Honda	23	+8.585	18	9
8	19	(Argentina) Gabriel Rodrigo	KTM	23	+8.658	6	8
9	14	(Italy) Tony Arbolino	Honda	23	+8.691	5	7
10	44	(Spain) Arón Canet	Honda	23	+8.809	4	6
11	21	(Italy) Fabio Di Giannantonio	Honda	23	+8.824	16	5
12	17	(United Kingdom) John McPhee	KTM	23	+8.944	30	4
13	84	(Czech Republic) Jakub Kornfeil	KTM	23	+9.671	13	3
14	65	(Germany) Philipp Öttl	KTM	23	+14.685	8	2
15	42	(Spain) Marcos Ramírez	KTM	23	+14.697	7	1
16	27	(Japan) Kaito Toba	Honda	23	+19.377	28	
17	7	(Malaysia) Adam Norrodin	Honda	23	+19.419	10	
18	24	(Japan) Tatsuki Suzuki	Honda	23	+19.504	17	
19	40	(South Africa) Darryn Binder	KTM	23	+19.550	27	
20	32	(Japan) Ai Ogura	Honda	23	+19.602	26	
21	22	(Japan) Kazuki Masaki	KTM	23	+19.706	25	
22	23	(Italy) Niccolò Antonelli	Honda	23	+19.981	14	
23	8	(Italy) Nicolò Bulega	KTM	23	+23.419	22	
24	72	(Spain) Alonso López	Honda	23	+24.056	20	
25	77	(Spain) Vicente Pérez	KTM	23	+27.634	29	
26	10	(Italy) Dennis Foggia	KTM	23	+27.747	15	
27	81	(Italy) Stefano Nepa	KTM	23	+35.938	21	
28	41	(Thailand) Nakarin Atiratphuvapat	Honda	23	+46.868	24	
29	73	(Austria) Maximilian Kofler	KTM	23	+47.289	23	
Ret	16	(Italy) Andrea Migno	KTM	11	Accident	19	
OFFICIAL MOTO3 REPORT

== Championship standings after the race ==
=== MotoGP ===
Pos.	Rider	Points
1	(Spain) Marc Márquez	201
2	(Italy) Valentino Rossi	142
3	(Spain) Jorge Lorenzo	130
4	(Italy) Andrea Dovizioso	129
5	(Spain) Maverick Viñales	113
6	(Italy) Danilo Petrucci	105
7	(France) Johann Zarco	104
8	(United Kingdom) Cal Crutchlow	103
9	(Italy) Andrea Iannone	84
10	(Spain) Álex Rins	66

=== Moto2 ===
Pos.	Rider	Points
1	(Italy) Francesco Bagnaia	189
2	(Portugal) Miguel Oliveira	186
3	(Spain) Álex Márquez	113
4	(South Africa) Brad Binder	111
5	(Italy) Lorenzo Baldassarri	106
6	(Spain) Joan Mir	103
7	(Germany) Marcel Schrötter	91
8	(Spain) Xavi Vierge	90
9	(France) Fabio Quartararo	84
10	(Italy) Mattia Pasini	82

=== Moto3 ===
Pos.	Rider	Points
1	(Italy) Marco Bezzecchi	158
2	(Spain) Jorge Martín	146
3	(Italy) Fabio Di Giannantonio	121
4	(Spain) Arón Canet	118
5	(Italy) Enea Bastianini	117
6	(Argentina) Gabriel Rodrigo	84
7	(Czech Republic) Jakub Kornfeil	80
8	(Spain) Marcos Ramírez	67
9	(Italy) Lorenzo Dalla Porta	63
10	(Italy) Andrea Migno	60

== Notes ==
Previous race: 2018 Czech Republic Grand Prix	FIM Grand Prix World Championship; 2018 season	Next race: 2018 British Grand Prix
Previous race: 2017 Austrian Grand Prix	Austrian motorcycle Grand Prix	Next race: 2019 Austrian Grand Prix
