= 2018 Malaysian motorcycle Grand Prix =

(Malaysia) 2018 Malaysian Grand Prix
Race details
- Race 18 of 19 races in the 2018 Grand Prix motorcycle racing season
- Date: 4 November 2018
- Official name: Shell Malaysia Motorcycle Grand Prix
- Location: Sepang International Circuit, Sepang, Selangor, Malaysia
- Course: Permanent racing facility; 5.543 km (3.444 mi)

MotoGP
Pole position
Rider	(Spain) Marc Márquez (Note: Marc Márquez, who set the fastest time in qualifying, received a grid penalty which promoted Johann Zarco to the pole position grid slot.)	Honda
Time	2:12.161	
Fastest lap
Rider	(Spain) Álex Rins	Suzuki
Time	2:00.762 on lap 5	
Podium
First	(Spain) Marc Márquez	Honda
Second	(Spain) Álex Rins	Suzuki
Third	(France) Johann Zarco	Yamaha

Moto2
Pole position
Rider	(Spain) Álex Márquez	Kalex
Time	2:05.629	
Fastest lap
Rider	(Italy) Luca Marini	Kalex
Time	2:07.423 on lap 2	
Podium
First	(Italy) Luca Marini	Kalex
Second	(Portugal) Miguel Oliveira	KTM
Third	(Italy) Francesco Bagnaia	Kalex

Moto3
Pole position
Rider	(Spain) Jorge Martín	Honda
Time	2:11.731	
Fastest lap
Rider	(Spain) Jorge Martín	Honda
Time	2:13.931 on lap 14	
Podium
First	(Spain) Jorge Martín	Honda
Second	(Italy) Lorenzo Dalla Porta	Honda
Third	(Italy) Enea Bastianini	Honda

The 2018 Malaysian motorcycle Grand Prix was the eighteenth round of the 2018 MotoGP season. It was held at the Sepang International Circuit in Sepang on 4 November 2018.

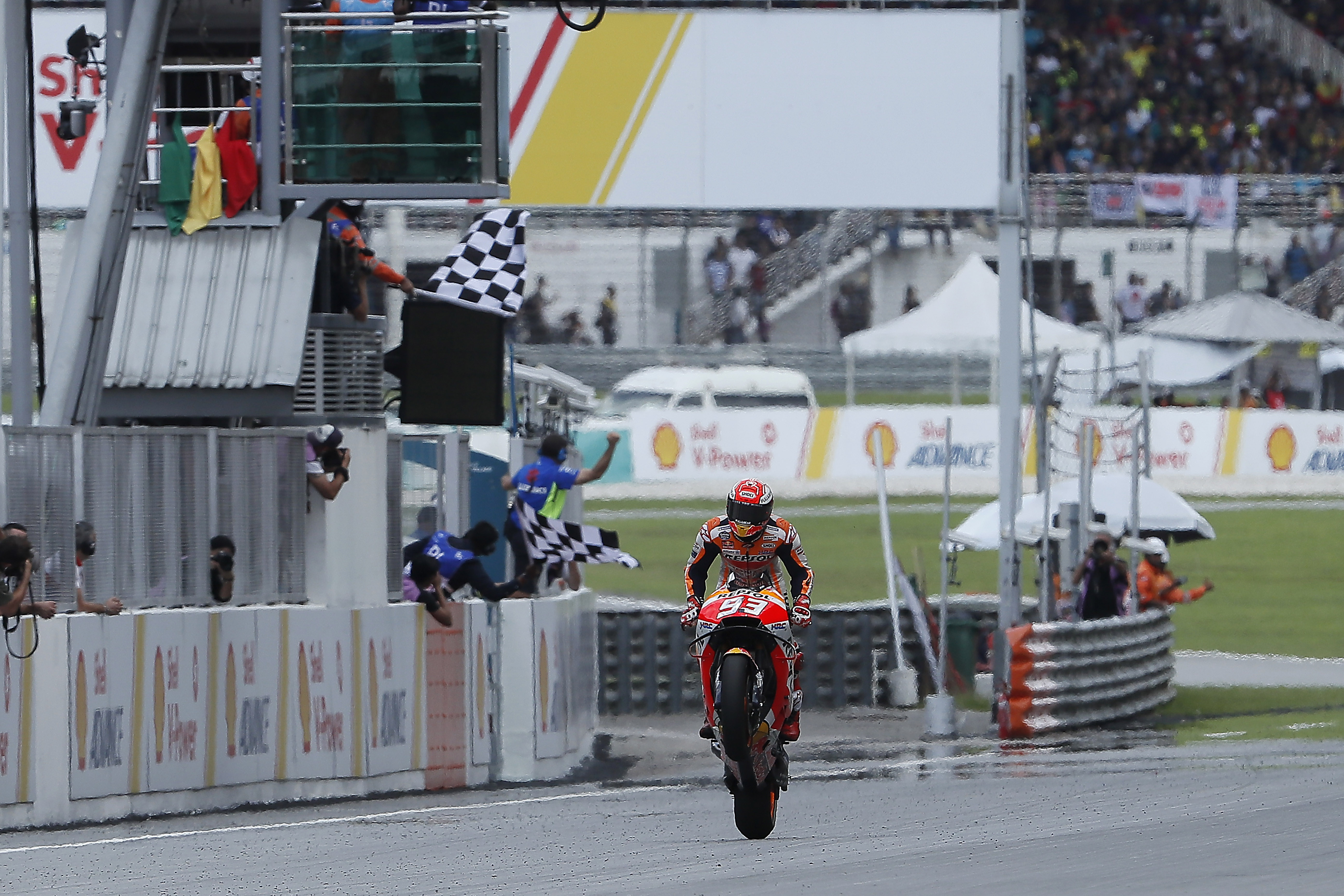
Marc Márquez, doing a wheelie to celebrate winning the MotoGP race.

== Classification ==
=== MotoGP ===
Pos.	No.	Rider	Team	Manufacturer	Laps	Time/Retired	Grid	Points
1	93	(Spain) Marc Márquez	Repsol Honda Team	Honda	20	40:32.372	7 (Note: 6-place grid penalty.)	25
2	42	(Spain) Álex Rins	Team Suzuki Ecstar	Suzuki	20	+1.898	8	20
3	5	(France) Johann Zarco	Monster Yamaha Tech 3	Yamaha	20	+2.474	1	16
4	25	(Spain) Maverick Viñales	Movistar Yamaha MotoGP	Yamaha	20	+4.667	11	13
5	26	(Spain) Dani Pedrosa	Repsol Honda Team	Honda	20	+6.190	10	11
6	4	(Italy) Andrea Dovizioso	Ducati Team	Ducati	20	+11.248	4	10
7	19	(Spain) Álvaro Bautista	Ángel Nieto Team	Ducati	20	+15.611	9	9
8	43	(Australia) Jack Miller	Alma Pramac Racing	Ducati	20	+19.009	5	8
9	9	(Italy) Danilo Petrucci	Alma Pramac Racing	Ducati	20	+22.921	6	7
10	55	(Malaysia) Hafizh Syahrin	Monster Yamaha Tech 3	Yamaha	20	+26.919	23	6
11	41	(Spain) Aleix Espargaró	Aprilia Racing Team Gresini	Aprilia	20	+29.503	12	5
12	21	(Italy) Franco Morbidelli	EG 0,0 Marc VDS	Honda	20	+30.933	19	4
13	6	(Germany) Stefan Bradl	LCR Honda Castrol	Honda	20	+35.322	20	3
14	30	(Japan) Takaaki Nakagami	LCR Honda Idemitsu	Honda	20	+37.912	22	2
15	38	(United Kingdom) Bradley Smith	Red Bull KTM Factory Racing	KTM	20	+39.675	17	1
16	12	(Switzerland) Thomas Lüthi	EG 0,0 Marc VDS	Honda	20	+41.820	18	
17	10	(Belgium) Xavier Siméon	Reale Avintia Racing	Ducati	20	+43.978	15	
18	46	(Italy) Valentino Rossi	Movistar Yamaha MotoGP	Yamaha	20	+58.288	2	
19	45	(United Kingdom) Scott Redding	Aprilia Racing Team Gresini	Aprilia	20	+1:00.191	13	
Ret	44	(Spain) Pol Espargaró	Red Bull KTM Factory Racing	KTM	16	Lost Power	16	
Ret	51	(Italy) Michele Pirro	Ducati Team	Ducati	5	Accident	14	
Ret	17	(Czech Republic) Karel Abraham	Ángel Nieto Team	Ducati	3	Electronics	21	
Ret	29	(Italy) Andrea Iannone	Team Suzuki Ecstar	Suzuki	0	Accident	3	
DNS	81	(Spain) Jordi Torres	Reale Avintia Racing	Ducati		Did not start		
WD	99	(Spain) Jorge Lorenzo	Ducati Team	Ducati		Withdrew		

- Jordi Torres suffered a broken finger in a crash during practice and withdrew from the event.
- Jorge Lorenzo withdrew from the event following Friday practice due to effects of wrist injury suffered at the Thailand GP and was replaced by Michele Pirro.

=== Moto2 ===
Pos.	No.	Rider	Manufacturer	Laps	Time/Retired	Grid	Points
1	10	(Italy) Luca Marini	Kalex	18	38:25.689	2	25
2	44	(Portugal) Miguel Oliveira	KTM	18	+1.194	7	20
3	42	(Italy) Francesco Bagnaia	Kalex	18	+3.020	6	16
4	54	(Italy) Mattia Pasini	Kalex	18	+4.497	5	13
5	20	(France) Fabio Quartararo	Speed Up	18	+5.250	3	11
6	7	(Italy) Lorenzo Baldassarri	Kalex	18	+5.305	13	10
7	73	(Spain) Álex Márquez	Kalex	18	+7.690	1	9
8	41	(South Africa) Brad Binder	KTM	18	+8.943	9	8
9	23	(Germany) Marcel Schrötter	Kalex	18	+9.687	10	7
10	36	(Spain) Joan Mir	Kalex	18	+18.547	18	6
11	97	(Spain) Xavi Vierge	Kalex	18	+18.816	8	5
12	5	(Italy) Andrea Locatelli	Kalex	18	+19.739	15	4
13	9	(Spain) Jorge Navarro	Kalex	18	+21.177	12	3
14	77	(Switzerland) Dominique Aegerter	KTM	18	+21.960	17	2
15	22	(United Kingdom) Sam Lowes	KTM	18	+26.875	21	1
16	24	(Italy) Simone Corsi	Kalex	18	+28.515	22	
17	89	(Malaysia) Khairul Idham Pawi	Kalex	18	+28.802	25	
18	16	(United States) Joe Roberts	NTS	18	+29.791	23	
19	2	(Switzerland) Jesko Raffin	Kalex	18	+30.557	20	
20	57	(Spain) Edgar Pons	Speed Up	18	+31.069	19	
21	4	(South Africa) Steven Odendaal	NTS	18	+38.430	24	
22	95	(France) Jules Danilo	Kalex	18	+42.930	27	
23	30	(Indonesia) Dimas Ekky Pratama	Tech 3	18	+57.507	28	
24	32	(Spain) Isaac Viñales	Suter	18	+57.910	30	
25	21	(Italy) Federico Fuligni	Kalex	18	+1:03.737	31	
26	50	(Indonesia) Rafid Topan Sucipto	Suter	18	+2:04.066	32	
Ret	40	(Spain) Augusto Fernández	Kalex	8	Accident	11	
Ret	66	(Finland) Niki Tuuli	Kalex	7	Accident	26	
Ret	45	(Japan) Tetsuta Nagashima	Kalex	7	Accident Damage	16	
Ret	87	(Australia) Remy Gardner	Tech 3	5	Accident Damage	4	
Ret	18	(Andorra) Xavi Cardelús	Kalex	5	Accident Damage	29	
Ret	27	(Spain) Iker Lecuona	KTM	2	Accident Damage	14	
OFFICIAL MOTO2 REPORT

=== Moto3 ===
Pos.	No.	Rider	Manufacturer	Laps	Time/Retired	Grid	Points
1	88	(Spain) Jorge Martín	Honda	17	38:34.799	1	25
2	48	(Italy) Lorenzo Dalla Porta	Honda	17	+3.556	14	20
3	33	(Italy) Enea Bastianini	Honda	17	+3.757	6	16
4	75	(Spain) Albert Arenas	KTM	17	+3.795	5	13
5	12	(Italy) Marco Bezzecchi	KTM	17	+4.095	2	11
6	21	(Italy) Fabio Di Giannantonio	Honda	17	+4.106	13	10
7	40	(South Africa) Darryn Binder	KTM	17	+4.232	11	9
8	14	(Italy) Tony Arbolino	Honda	17	+4.704	3	8
9	24	(Japan) Tatsuki Suzuki	Honda	17	+4.707	7	7
10	23	(Italy) Niccolò Antonelli	Honda	17	+4.715	10	6
11	42	(Spain) Marcos Ramírez	KTM	17	+4.727	18	5
12	27	(Japan) Kaito Toba	Honda	17	+5.101	19	4
13	77	(Spain) Vicente Pérez	KTM	17	+6.392	20	3
14	41	(Thailand) Nakarin Atiratphuvapat	Honda	17	+7.063	23	2
15	22	(Japan) Kazuki Masaki	KTM	17	+7.353	8	1
16	16	(Italy) Andrea Migno	KTM	17	+7.478	22	
17	76	(Kazakhstan) Makar Yurchenko	Honda	17	+7.626	26	
18	71	(Japan) Ayumu Sasaki	Honda	17	+13.843	9	
19	65	(Germany) Philipp Öttl	KTM	17	+19.992	24	
20	84	(Czech Republic) Jakub Kornfeil	KTM	17	+26.678	21	
21	81	(Italy) Stefano Nepa	KTM	17	+34.184	27 (Note: 12-place grid penalty.)	
22	9	(Thailand) Apiwat Wongthananon	KTM	17	+34.468	25	
23	7	(Malaysia) Adam Norrodin	Honda	17	+1:37.387	28 (Note: Pit lane start penalty.)	
Ret	44	(Spain) Arón Canet	Honda	10	Accident	15	
Ret	72	(Spain) Alonso López	Honda	6	Accident	17	
Ret	17	(United Kingdom) John McPhee	KTM	6	Accident	4	
Ret	10	(Italy) Dennis Foggia	KTM	6	Accident	16	
Ret	31	(Italy) Celestino Vietti	KTM	2	Accident	12	
OFFICIAL MOTO3 REPORT

== Championship standings after the race ==
- **Bold text** indicates the World Champions.

=== MotoGP ===
	Pos.	Rider	Points
	1	(Spain) **Marc Márquez**	321
	2	(Italy) Andrea Dovizioso	220
	3	(Italy) Valentino Rossi	195
	4	(Spain) Maverick Viñales	193
5	5	(Spain) Álex Rins	149
1	6	(France) Johann Zarco	149
2	7	(United Kingdom) Cal Crutchlow	148
2	8	(Italy) Danilo Petrucci	144
1	9	(Italy) Andrea Iannone	133
1	10	(Spain) Jorge Lorenzo	130

=== Moto2 ===
	Pos.	Rider	Points
	1	(Italy) **Francesco Bagnaia**	304
	2	(Portugal) Miguel Oliveira	272
	3	(South Africa) Brad Binder	201
	4	(Italy) Lorenzo Baldassarri	162
1	5	(Spain) Álex Márquez	157
1	6	(Spain) Joan Mir	155
2	7	(Italy) Luca Marini	147
1	8	(Germany) Marcel Schrötter	138
1	9	(Spain) Xavi Vierge	131
	10	(France) Fabio Quartararo	128

=== Moto3 ===
Pos.	Rider	Points
1	(Spain) **Jorge Martín**	240
2	(Italy) Marco Bezzecchi	214
3	(Italy) Fabio Di Giannantonio	205
4	(Italy) Enea Bastianini	166
5	(Italy) Lorenzo Dalla Porta	151
6	(Spain) Arón Canet	128
7	(Argentina) Gabriel Rodrigo	116
8	(Czech Republic) Jakub Kornfeil	115
9	(Spain) Albert Arenas	107
10	(Spain) Marcos Ramírez	95

== Notes ==
Previous race: 2018 Australian Grand Prix	FIM Grand Prix World Championship; 2018 season	Next race: 2018 Valencian Grand Prix
Previous race: 2017 Malaysian Grand Prix	Malaysian motorcycle Grand Prix	Next race: 2019 Malaysian Grand Prix
