= Isaac Viñales =

Spanish motorcycle racer

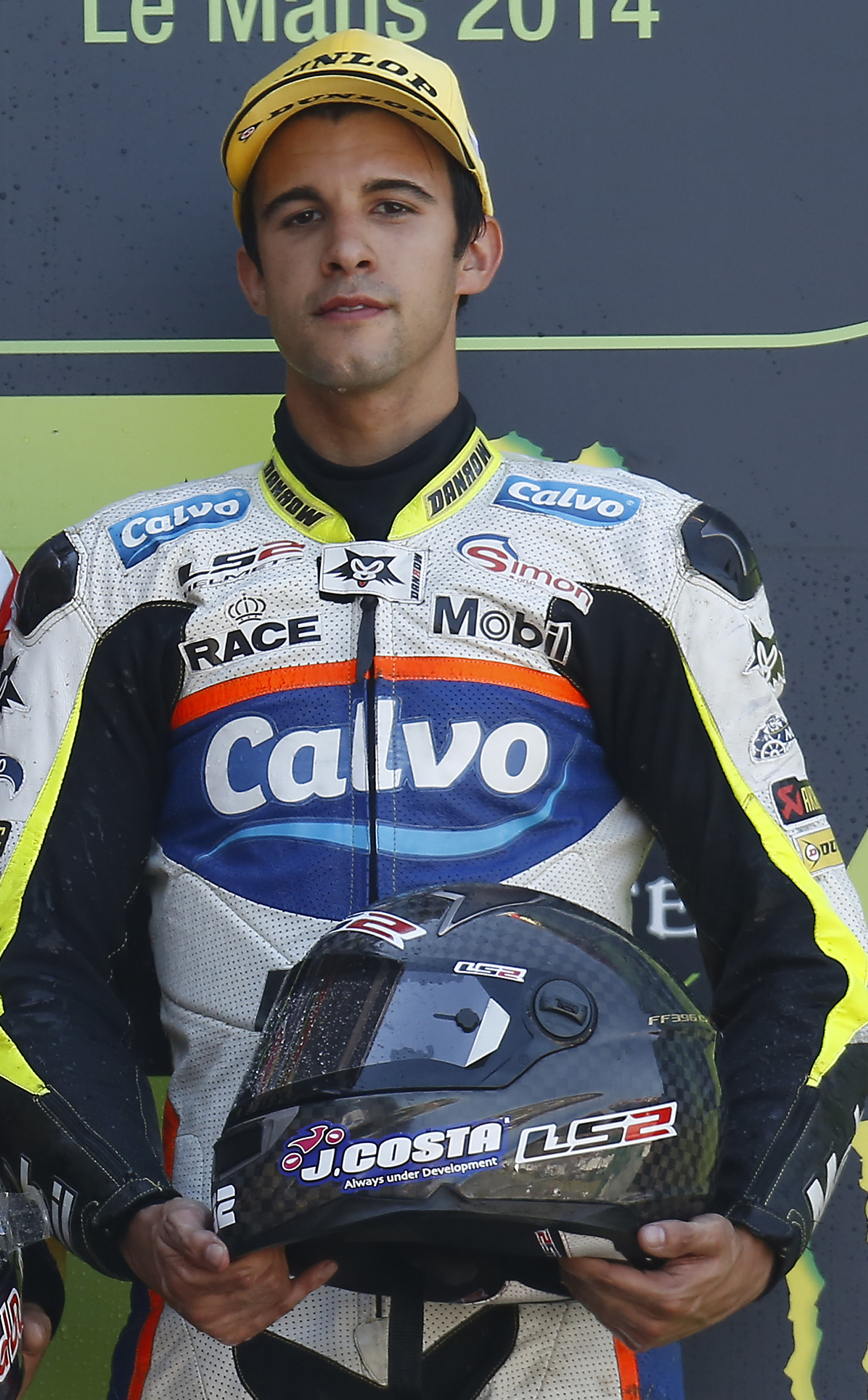
- Viñales at the 2014 French Grand Prix
- Nationality: Spanish
- Born: 6 November 1993 (age 33); Llançà, Spain
- Current team: Tati Team Ava6 Racing
- Bike number: 4
Motorcycle racing career statistics
Moto2 World Championship
Active years	2016–2018
Manufacturers	Tech3, Kalex, Suter
Championships	0
2018 championship position	26th (7 pts)
Starts / Wins / Podiums / Poles / F. laps / Points; 50 / 0 / 0 / 0 / 0 / 44
Moto3 World Championship
Active years	2012–2015
Manufacturers	FTR Honda, KTM, Husqvarna
Championships	0
2015 championship position	9th (115 pts)
Starts / Wins / Podiums / Poles / F. laps / Points; 68 / 0 / 4 / 0 / 1 / 311
125cc World Championship
Active years	2010
Manufacturers	Aprilia, Lambretta
Championships	0
2010 championship position	25th (3 pts)
Starts / Wins / Podiums / Poles / F. laps / Points; 5 / 0 / 0 / 0 / 0 / 3
Superbike World Championship
Active years	2021–2023
Manufacturers	Kawasaki
Championships	0
2023 championship position	26th (1 pts)
Starts / Wins / Podiums / Poles / F. laps / Points; 61 / 0 / 0 / 0 / 0 / 46
Supersport World Championship
Active years	2019–2020, 2022
Manufacturers	Yamaha, Ducati
Championships	0
2022 championship position	25th (22 pts)
Starts / Wins / Podiums / Poles / F. laps / Points; 37 / 0 / 5 / 0 / 4 / 235

Isaac Viñales Mares (born 6 November 1993) is a Spanish motorcycle racer, currently competing in the FIM Endurance World Championship for Tati Team Ava6 Racing. He previously raced in the Superbike World Championship for Team Pedercini. He is the cousin of former Moto3 World Champion and current MotoGP rider Maverick Viñales.

== Career statistics ==
=== Career highlights ===
- 2008: 1st, Pre-GP 125cc Evo Championship

=== Grand Prix motorcycle racing ===
==== By season ====
Season	Class	Motorcycle	Team	Race	Win	Podium	Pole	FLap	Pts	Plcd
2010	125cc	Aprilia	Catalunya Racing Team	3	0	0	0	0	3	25th
2010	125cc	Lambretta	Lambretta Reparto Corse	2	0	0	0	0	3	25th
2012	Moto3	FTR Honda	Ongetta-Centro Seta	15	0	0	0	0	8	28th
2013	Moto3	FTR Honda	Ongetta-Centro Seta	17	0	0	0	0	47	17th
2014	Moto3	KTM	Team Calvo	18	0	3	0	0	141	7th
2015	Moto3	Husqvarna	Husqvarna Factory Laglisse	9	0	1	0	1	115	9th
2015	Moto3	KTM	RBA Racing Team	9	0	1	0	1	115	9th
2016	Moto2	Tech 3	Tech 3 Racing	17	0	0	0	0	19	24th
2017	Moto2	Kalex	BE-A-VIP SAG Team	18	0	0	0	0	18	22nd
2018	Moto2	Kalex	SAG Team	9	0	0	0	0	7	26th
2018	Moto2	Suter	Forward Racing Team	6	0	0	0	0	7	26th
Total				**123**	**0**	**4**	**0**	**1**	**358**	

==== By class ====
Class	Seasons	1st GP	1st pod	1st win	Race	Win	Podiums	Pole	FLap	Pts	WChmp
125cc	2010	2010 Spain			5	0	0	0	0	3	0
Moto3	2012–2015	2012 Qatar	2014 France		68	0	4	0	1	311	0
Moto2	2016–2018	2016 Qatar			50	0	0	0	0	44	0
Total	2010, 2012–2018				**123**	**0**	**4**	**0**	**1**	**358**	**0**

==== Races by year ====
(key) (Races in bold indicate pole position; races in italics indicate fastest lap)

Year	Class	Bike	1	2	3	4	5	6	7	8	9	10	11	12	13	14	15	16	17	18	19	Pos	Pts
2010	125cc	Aprilia	QAT	SPA; 16	FRA	ITA	GBR	NED	CAT; Ret	GER									VAL; 13			25th	3
2010	125cc	Lambretta									CZE; 22	INP; Ret	RSM	ARA; DNS	JPN	MAL	AUS	POR				25th	3
2012	Moto3	FTR Honda	QAT; Ret	SPA; Ret	POR; Ret	FRA; Ret	CAT; 24	GBR; 23	NED; 21	GER; 21	ITA; 19	INP; 14	CZE; DNS	RSM	ARA; 17	JPN; 23	MAL; 19	AUS; 10	VAL; 20			28th	8
2013	Moto3	FTR Honda	QAT; Ret	AME; 13	SPA; 17	FRA; 10	ITA; 13	CAT; 11	NED; 11	GER; 12	INP; Ret	CZE; Ret	GBR; 11	RSM; 14	ARA; 18	MAL; 14	AUS; 13	JPN; Ret	VAL; 7			17th	47
2014	Moto3	KTM	QAT; 8	AME; Ret	ARG; 7	SPA; 5	FRA; 3	ITA; 2	CAT; 7	NED; 7	GER; 8	INP; 17	CZE; 10	GBR; 13	RSM; 4	ARA; 12	JPN; 11	AUS; Ret	MAL; Ret	VAL; 2		7th	141
2015	Moto3	Husqvarna	QAT; 6	AME; 9	ARG; 3	SPA; 11	FRA; 7	ITA; 8	CAT; 7	NED; Ret	GER; 18											9th	115
2015	Moto3	KTM										INP; 5	CZE; Ret	GBR; Ret	RSM; 9	ARA; Ret	JPN; 4	AUS; 8	MAL; 14	VAL; 6		9th	115
2016	Moto2	Tech 3	QAT; 19	ARG; 24	AME; 18	SPA; 13	FRA; 20	ITA; 24	CAT; 16	NED; 21	GER; 9	AUT; 18	CZE; 14	GBR; Ret	RSM; Ret	ARA; 28	JPN; 15	AUS; DNS	MAL; 10	VAL; Ret		24th	19
2017	Moto2	Kalex	QAT; 21	ARG; 17	AME; 17	SPA; 18	FRA; Ret	ITA; 13	CAT; 12	NED; Ret	GER; 22	CZE; 25	AUT; Ret	GBR; 18	RSM; Ret	ARA; Ret	JPN; 24	AUS; 19	MAL; 9	VAL; 12		22nd	18
2018	Moto2	Kalex	QAT; 16	ARG; 14	AME; 11	SPA; 19	FRA; Ret	ITA; 16	CAT; Ret	NED; 22	GER; Ret	CZE										26th	7
2018	Moto2	Suter											AUT; 23	GBR; C	RSM; DNS	ARA; DNS	THA; 24	JPN; 26	AUS; Ret	MAL; 24	VAL; 16	26th	7

=== Supersport World Championship ===
==== Races by year ====
(key) (Races in bold indicate pole position, races in italics indicate fastest lap)

Year	Bike	1	2	3	4	5	6	7	8	9	10	11	12	13	14	15	16	17	18	19	20	21	22	23	24	Pos	Pts
2019	Yamaha	AUS; Ret	THA; 4	SPA; 10	NED; 8	ITA; 6	SPA; 8	ITA; 27	GBR; 22	POR; Ret	FRA; 2	ARG; 3	QAT; 3													7th	97
2020	Yamaha	AUS; 8	SPA; Ret	SPA; 7	POR; 5	POR; 3	SPA; 7	SPA; 6	SPA; Ret	SPA; 3	SPA; 15	SPA; 6	FRA; 13	FRA; Ret	POR; 4	POR; 6										8th	116
2022	Ducati	SPA	SPA	NED	NED	POR	POR	ITA	ITA	GBR; 20	GBR; 14	CZE; 10	CZE; Ret	FRA; 18	FRA; 15	SPA; 21	SPA; 23	POR; 10	POR; 9	ARG	ARG	INA	INA	AUS	AUS	25th	22

=== Superbike World Championship ===
==== Races by year ====
(key) (Races in bold indicate pole position) (Races in italics indicate fastest lap)

Year	Bike	1			2			3			4			5			6			7			8			9			10			11			12			13			Pos	Pts
Year	Bike	R1	SR	R2	R1	SR	R2	R1	SR	R2	R1	SR	R2	R1	SR	R2	R1	SR	R2	R1	SR	R2	R1	SR	R2	R1	SR	R2	R1	SR	R2	R1	SR	R2	R1	SR	R2	R1	SR	R2	Pos	Pts
2021	Kawasaki	SPA; 13	SPA; 15	SPA; 13	POR; 17	POR; 17	POR; 15	ITA; 17	ITA; 15	ITA; 17	GBR; 15	GBR; 13	GBR; 17	NED; 11	NED; 13	NED; 14	CZE; 12	CZE; 17	CZE; 17	SPA	SPA	SPA	FRA; 15	FRA; Ret	FRA; DNS	SPA; 14	SPA; 12	SPA; 15	SPA; DNS	SPA; C	SPA; DNS	POR; 11	POR; 10	POR; 12	ARG; Ret	ARG; 17	ARG; 13	INA; 13	INA; C	INA; 9	17th	45
2022	Kawasaki	SPA	SPA	SPA	NED	NED	NED	POR; 21	POR; 13	POR; Ret	ITA	ITA	ITA	GBR	GBR	GBR	CZE	CZE	CZE	FRA	FRA	FRA	SPA	SPA	SPA}	POR	POR	POR	ARG	ARG	ARG	INA	INA	INA	AUS	AUS	AUS				NC	0
2023	Kawasaki	AUS	AUS	AUS	INA	INA	INA	NED; 23	NED; Ret	NED; 18	SPA; Ret	SPA; 20	SPA; Ret	ITA; 20	ITA; 17	ITA; 16	GBR; 15	GBR; 21	GBR; 16	ITA; Ret	ITA; 22	ITA; Ret	CZE; 18	CZE; 16	CZE; 17	FRA; Ret	FRA; 19	FRA; 16	SPA; 20	SPA; 20	SPA; 20	POR; Ret	POR; 20	POR; 18	ARG	ARG	ARG				26th	1

=== FIM Endurance World Championship ===
Year	Team	Bike	Tyre	Rider	Pts	TC
2025	(France) Maxxess By BMRT 3D	Kawasaki ZX-10R	**P**	(Spain) Isaac Viñales (Spain) Mathieu Gines (Belgium) Loris Cresson	40	10th

==== Suzuka 8 Hours results ====
Year	Class	Team	Co-riders	Bike	Pos
2025	**EWC**	(France) Tati Team AVA6 Racing	(France) Hugo Clere (Japan) Sho Nishimura	Honda CBR1000RR	Ret
2026	**EWC**	(France) Tati Team AVA6 Racing	(France) Hugo Clere (France) Mike Di Meglio	Honda CBR1000RR	Ret
