= 2017 Australian motorcycle Grand Prix =

(Australia) 2017 Australian Grand Prix
Race details
- Race 16 of 18 races in the 2017 Grand Prix motorcycle racing season
- Date: 22 October 2017
- Official name: Michelin Australian Motorcycle Grand Prix
- Location: Phillip Island Grand Prix Circuit
- Course: Permanent racing facility; 4.448 km (2.764 mi)

MotoGP
Pole position
Rider	(Spain) Marc Márquez	Honda
Time	1:28.386	
Fastest lap
Rider	(France) Johann Zarco	Yamaha
Time	1:29.572 on lap 2	
Podium
First	(Spain) Marc Márquez	Honda
Second	(Italy) Valentino Rossi	Yamaha
Third	(Spain) Maverick Viñales	Yamaha

Moto2
Pole position
Rider	(Italy) Mattia Pasini	Kalex
Time	1:33.300	
Fastest lap
Rider	(South Africa) Brad Binder	KTM
Time	1:33.864 on lap 24	
Podium
First	(Portugal) Miguel Oliveira	KTM
Second	(South Africa) Brad Binder	KTM
Third	(Italy) Franco Morbidelli	Kalex

Moto3
Pole position
Rider	(Spain) Jorge Martín	Honda
Time	1:37.030	
Fastest lap
Rider	(Argentina) Gabriel Rodrigo	KTM
Time	1:37.898 on lap 7	
Podium
First	(Spain) Joan Mir	Honda
Second	(Belgium) Livio Loi	Honda
Third	(Spain) Jorge Martín	Honda

The 2017 Australian motorcycle Grand Prix was the sixteenth round of the 2017 MotoGP season. It was held at the Phillip Island Grand Prix Circuit in Phillip Island on 22 October 2017.

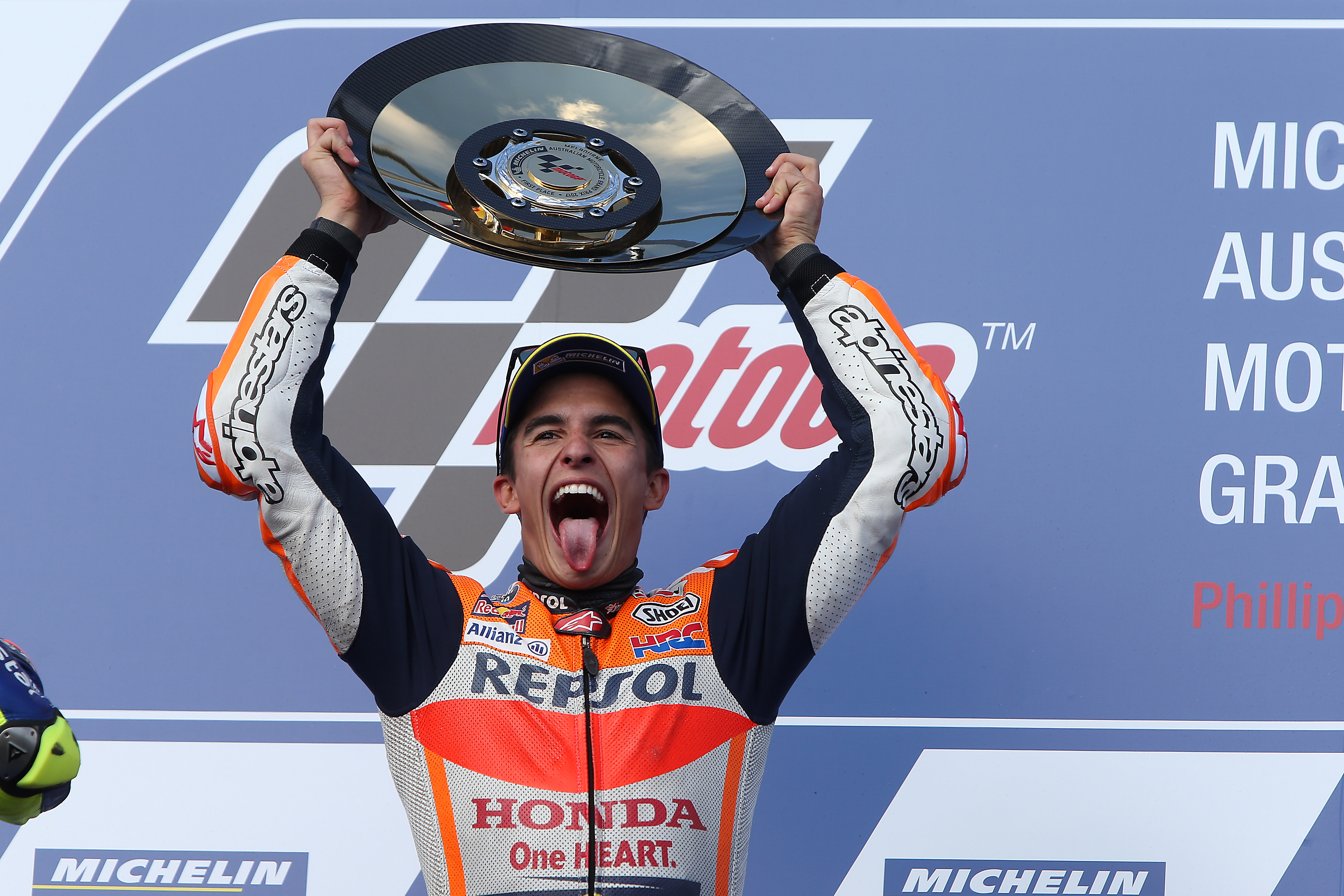
Marc Márquez, celebrating on the podium after winning the MotoGP race.

== Classification ==
=== MotoGP ===
Pos.	No.	Rider	Team	Manufacturer	Laps	Time/Retired	Grid	Points
1	93	(Spain) Marc Márquez	Repsol Honda Team	Honda	27	40:49.772	1	25
2	46	(Italy) Valentino Rossi	Movistar Yamaha MotoGP	Yamaha	27	+1.799	7	20
3	25	(Spain) Maverick Viñales	Movistar Yamaha MotoGP	Yamaha	27	+1.826	2	16
4	5	(France) Johann Zarco	Monster Yamaha Tech 3	Yamaha	27	+1.842	3	13
5	35	(United Kingdom) Cal Crutchlow	LCR Honda	Honda	27	+3.845	10	11
6	29	(Italy) Andrea Iannone	Team Suzuki Ecstar	Suzuki	27	+3.871	4	10
7	43	(Australia) Jack Miller	EG 0,0 Marc VDS	Honda	27	+5.619	5	9
8	42	(Spain) Álex Rins	Team Suzuki Ecstar	Suzuki	27	+12.208	13	8
9	44	(Spain) Pol Espargaró	Red Bull KTM Factory Racing	KTM	27	+16.251	6	7
10	38	(United Kingdom) Bradley Smith	Red Bull KTM Factory Racing	KTM	27	+16.262	9	6
11	45	(United Kingdom) Scott Redding	Octo Pramac Racing	Ducati	27	+21.652	20	5
12	26	(Spain) Dani Pedrosa	Repsol Honda Team	Honda	27	+21.668	12	4
13	4	(Italy) Andrea Dovizioso	Ducati Team	Ducati	27	+21.692	11	3
14	17	(Czech Republic) Karel Abraham	Pull&Bear Aspar Team	Ducati	27	+26.110	15	2
15	99	(Spain) Jorge Lorenzo	Ducati Team	Ducati	27	+26.168	16	1
16	53	(Spain) Tito Rabat	EG 0,0 Marc VDS	Honda	27	+26.252	14	
17	19	(Spain) Álvaro Bautista	Pull&Bear Aspar Team	Ducati	27	+36.377	22	
18	76	(France) Loris Baz	Reale Avintia Racing	Ducati	27	+39.654	17	
19	22	(United Kingdom) Sam Lowes	Aprilia Racing Team Gresini	Aprilia	27	+40.400	23	
20	8	(Spain) Héctor Barberá	Reale Avintia Racing	Ducati	27	+45.901	19	
21	9	(Italy) Danilo Petrucci	Octo Pramac Racing	Ducati	27	+48.768	18	
22	23	(Australia) Broc Parkes	Monster Yamaha Tech 3	Yamaha	27	+57.711	21	
Ret	41	(Spain) Aleix Espargaró	Aprilia Racing Team Gresini	Aprilia	7	Accident	8	

=== Moto2 ===
Miguel Oliveira took his first victory in the Moto2 class and became the first Portuguese rider to win in the intermediate class. KTM took their first victory in Moto2, the first in the intermediate class since the 250cc 2008 British Grand Prix; this ended Kalex winning streak, which had started at the 2015 Argentine Grand Prix.

Pos.	No.	Rider	Manufacturer	Laps	Time/Retired	Grid	Points
1	44	(Portugal) Miguel Oliveira	KTM	25	39:25.920	3	25
2	41	(South Africa) Brad Binder	KTM	25	+2.974	4	20
3	21	(Italy) Franco Morbidelli	Kalex	25	+3.846	5	16
4	2	(Switzerland) Jesko Raffin	Kalex	25	+7.348	9	13
5	97	(Spain) Xavi Vierge	Tech 3	25	+7.403	12	11
6	73	(Spain) Álex Márquez	Kalex	25	+12.125	6	10
7	24	(Italy) Simone Corsi	Speed Up	25	+12.217	15	9
8	77	(Switzerland) Dominique Aegerter	Suter	25	+12.244	8	8
9	11	(Germany) Sandro Cortese	Suter	25	+12.475	13	7
10	12	(Switzerland) Thomas Lüthi	Kalex	25	+12.605	10	6
11	49	(Spain) Axel Pons	Kalex	25	+12.971	14	5
12	42	(Italy) Francesco Bagnaia	Kalex	25	+20.887	17	4
13	62	(Italy) Stefano Manzi	Kalex	25	+28.821	21	3
14	7	(Italy) Lorenzo Baldassarri	Kalex	25	+31.214	19	2
15	87	(Australia) Remy Gardner	Tech 3	25	+34.678	16	1
16	55	(Malaysia) Hafizh Syahrin	Kalex	25	+34.911	23	
17	37	(Spain) Augusto Fernández	Speed Up	25	+35.694	24	
18	45	(Japan) Tetsuta Nagashima	Kalex	25	+56.487	27	
19	32	(Spain) Isaac Viñales	Kalex	25	+56.528	25	
20	27	(Spain) Iker Lecuona	Kalex	25	+56.550	26	
21	89	(Malaysia) Khairul Idham Pawi	Kalex	25	+57.548	28	
22	6	(United Kingdom) Tarran Mackenzie	Suter	25	+1:01.191	29	
23	10	(Italy) Luca Marini	Kalex	25	+1:39.824	30	
Ret	30	(Japan) Takaaki Nakagami	Kalex	23	Accident	7	
Ret	57	(Spain) Edgar Pons	Kalex	23	Retired	22	
Ret	40	(France) Fabio Quartararo	Kalex	5	Accident	20	
Ret	5	(Italy) Andrea Locatelli	Kalex	2	Accident	11	
Ret	9	(Spain) Jorge Navarro	Kalex	2	Accident	18	
Ret	23	(Germany) Marcel Schrötter	Suter	1	Accident	2	
Ret	54	(Italy) Mattia Pasini	Kalex	1	Collision	1	
DNS	19	(Belgium) Xavier Siméon	Kalex		Did not start		
OFFICIAL MOTO2 REPORT

=== Moto3 ===
The race, scheduled to be run for 23 laps, was red-flagged on lap 16 due to a rain shower that fell on certain parts of the track. As the race already went through two-thirds of race distance, the race was stopped and the final results were taken at the end of the 15th lap and full points were awarded.

Pos.	No.	Rider	Manufacturer	Laps	Time/Retired	Grid	Points
1	36	(Spain) Joan Mir	Honda	15	24:51.490	3	25
2	11	(Belgium) Livio Loi	Honda	15	+0.351	21	20
3	88	(Spain) Jorge Martín	Honda	15	+0.359	1	16
4	19	(Argentina) Gabriel Rodrigo	KTM	15	+0.388	2	13
5	33	(Italy) Enea Bastianini	Honda	15	+0.408	9	11
6	5	(Italy) Romano Fenati	Honda	15	+0.808	5	10
7	71	(Japan) Ayumu Sasaki	Honda	15	+0.834	17	9
8	7	(Malaysia) Adam Norrodin	Honda	15	+1.291	22	8
9	24	(Japan) Tatsuki Suzuki	Honda	15	+3.648	10	7
10	48	(Italy) Lorenzo Dalla Porta	Mahindra	15	+4.005	14	6
11	8	(Italy) Nicolò Bulega	KTM	15	+4.036	23	5
12	84	(Czech Republic) Jakub Kornfeil	Peugeot	15	+4.085	20	4
13	65	(Germany) Philipp Öttl	KTM	15	+4.251	13	3
14	16	(Italy) Andrea Migno	KTM	15	+6.004	26	2
15	96	(Italy) Manuel Pagliani	Mahindra	15	+6.540	7	1
16	64	(Netherlands) Bo Bendsneyder	KTM	15	+19.418	19	
17	41	(Thailand) Nakarin Atiratphuvapat	Honda	15	+25.293	28	
18	14	(Italy) Tony Arbolino	Honda	15	+40.800	24	
19	6	(Spain) María Herrera	Mahindra	15	+40.858	27	
20	27	(Japan) Kaito Toba	Honda	15	+43.698	30	
21	42	(Spain) Marcos Ramírez	KTM	15	+1:38.853	16	
22	70	(Australia) Tom Toparis	KTM	14	+1 lap	31	
23	58	(Spain) Juan Francisco Guevara	KTM	14	+1 lap	4	
24	40	(South Africa) Darryn Binder	KTM	12	+3 laps	18	
NC	44	(Spain) Arón Canet	Honda	10	+5 laps	8	
Ret	4	(Finland) Patrik Pulkkinen	Peugeot	9	Accident	29	
Ret	12	(Italy) Marco Bezzecchi	Mahindra	7	Accident	12	
Ret	95	(France) Jules Danilo	Honda	5	Accident	6	
Ret	21	(Italy) Fabio Di Giannantonio	Honda	4	Accident	11	
Ret	23	(Italy) Niccolò Antonelli	KTM	1	Accident	15	
Ret	17	(United Kingdom) John McPhee	Honda	0	Accident	25	
OFFICIAL MOTO3 REPORT

== Championship standings after the race ==
=== MotoGP ===
Below are the standings for the top five riders and constructors after round sixteen has concluded.

Riders' Championship standings

Pos.	Rider	Points
1	(Spain) Marc Márquez	269
2	(Italy) Andrea Dovizioso	236
3	(Spain) Maverick Viñales	219
4	(Italy) Valentino Rossi	188
5	(Spain) Dani Pedrosa	174

Constructors' Championship standings

Pos.	Constructor	Points
1	(Japan) Honda	319
2	(Japan) Yamaha	285
3	(Italy) Ducati	278
4	(Japan) Suzuki	87
5	(Italy) Aprilia	64

- Note: Only the top five positions are included for both sets of standings.

=== Moto2 ===
Pos.	Rider	Points
1	(Italy) Franco Morbidelli	272
2	(Switzerland) Thomas Lüthi	243
3	(Portugal) Miguel Oliveira	191
4	(Spain) Álex Márquez	190
5	(Italy) Francesco Bagnaia	150
6	(Italy) Mattia Pasini	135
7	(Japan) Takaaki Nakagami	128
8	(Italy) Simone Corsi	105
9	(Spain) Xavi Vierge	90
10	(South Africa) Brad Binder	89

=== Moto3 ===
Pos.	Rider	Points
1	(Spain) Joan Mir	296
2	(Italy) Romano Fenati	226
3	(Spain) Arón Canet	184
4	(Spain) Jorge Martín	151
5	(Italy) Fabio Di Giannantonio	146
6	(Italy) Enea Bastianini	114
7	(United Kingdom) John McPhee	112
8	(Italy) Andrea Migno	108
9	(Spain) Marcos Ramírez	107
10	(Germany) Philipp Öttl	104

Previous race: 2017 Japanese Grand Prix	FIM Grand Prix World Championship; 2017 season	Next race: 2017 Malaysian Grand Prix
Previous race: 2016 Australian Grand Prix	Australian motorcycle Grand Prix	Next race: 2018 Australian Grand Prix
