= Xavi Vierge =

Spanish motorcycle racer (born 1997)

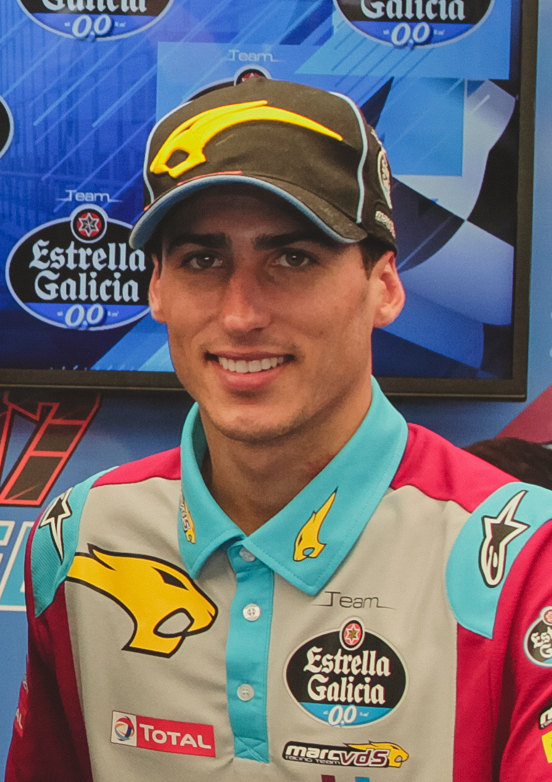
- Vierge in 2019
- Nationality: Spanish
- Born: 30 April 1997 (age 29); Barcelona, Spain
- Current team: Barni Spark Racing Team
- Bike number: 97
Motorcycle racing career statistics
Moto2 World Championship
Active years	2015–2021
Manufacturers	Tech 3 (2015–2017); Kalex (2018–2021)
Championships	0
2021 championship position	11th (93 pts)
Starts / Wins / Podiums / Poles / F. laps / Points; 110 / 0 / 4 / 3 / 2 / 519
Superbike World Championship
Active years	2022–
Manufacturers	Honda (2022–2025); Yamaha (2026–)
Championships	0
2025 championship position	7th (185 pts)
Starts / Wins / Podiums / Poles / F. laps / Points; 149 / 0 / 1 / 0 / 0 / 650

Xavier Vierge Zafra (born 30 April 1997) is a Spanish motorcycle racer, contracted to race for Yamaha in the 2026 Superbike World Championship.

== Career ==
=== Early career ===
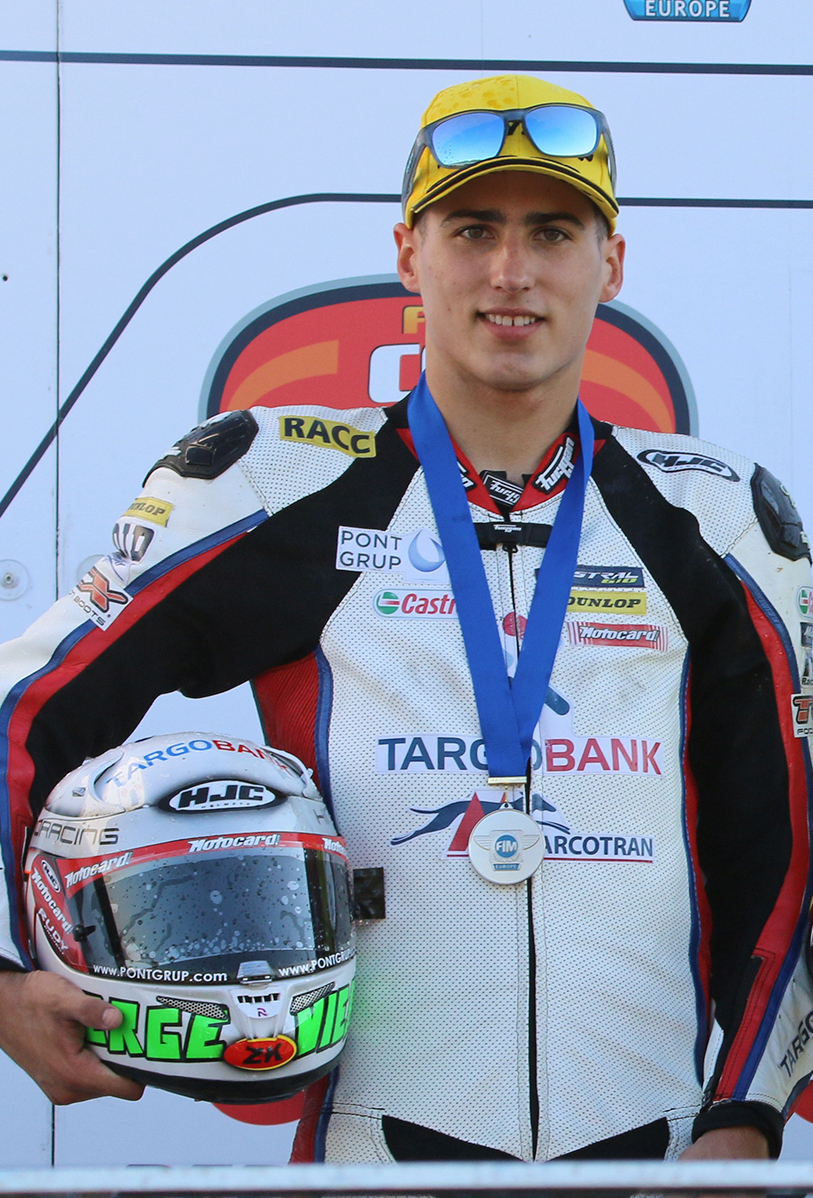
Vierge in 2015

Born in Barcelona, Vierge was the 2015 FIM CEV Moto2 European Championship runner-up, winning six races, finishing in second three times, and in third place once, out of the eleven races that year.

=== Moto2 World Championship ===
==== Tech 3 Racing (2015–2017) ====
In the same year, Vierge made his debut in the 2015 Moto2 World Championship as the permanent replacement for Ricard Cardús in the Tech3 team from the tenth round of the season onwards, but failed to score any championship points.

Vierge was retained by the team for the 2016 Moto2 season, where he scored his first Grand Prix points in Argentina and achieved a best result of eighth in Sepang. At the end of the season, he collected 37 points, and was awarded the Moto2 Rookie of the Year prize, winning it by one point over Miguel Oliveira.

Vierge stayed with the Tech3 team for the 2017 season, this time partnered by Australian Remy Gardner. At the Italian Grand Prix, Vierge was forced to sit out of the race due to a thoracic trauma following a crash in qualifying. In Assen, Vierge suffered a broken arm in free practice and was again forced to sit out the event. He also had to sit out the next round at Sachsenring and was replaced by Héctor Garzó. At Motegi, Vierge claimed his first podium finish in the championship with a second-place finish. He ended the season 11th in the standings, with 98 points.

==== Dynavolt Intact GP (2018) ====
On 5 August 2017, it was announced that Vierge would join Dynavolt Intact GP for the 2018 season, partnering Marcel Schrötter, who was also his teammate at Tech3 in the second half of 2015. He took his first pole at Argentina, and finished the race in second place. At Austria, he had a nasty crash in qualifying after a coming together with Steven Odendaal, causing him to miss the race and the next weekend at Silverstone. He would grab a podium with his third-place finish at Phillip Island, and finish the season in 11th again, with 131 points.

==== EG 0,0 Marc VDS (2019) ====
On 22 August 2018, it was confirmed that Vierge would sign for EG 0,0 Marc VDS for the 2019 season, partnering Álex Márquez, the younger brother of Marc Márquez. Vierge replaced Joan Mir, who moved up to MotoGP with Suzuki. His place at Dynavolt Intact GP was taken by Thomas Lüthi, who returned to Moto2 after one season in the premier class. In the opening race in Qatar, also the first race with the new Triumph 765cc triple engines, Vierge qualified in second, took the lead at the start, but then fell back to tenth place by the end of the race. In the next race in Argentina, Vierge took pole position for the second consecutive season, however a problem on the warm-up lap meant he could not start the race. His bad luck continued at Austin, when he was involved in a first-lap crash at turn one along with Fabio Di Giannantonio and Joe Roberts. His unlucky season continued throughout the whole year, his best result being a fourth-place finish, and Vierge only finished 13th in the standings, collecting 81 points.

==== Petronas Sprinta Racing (2020–2021) ====
After a disappointing 2019, Vierge moved on to the Sepang Racing Team for the 2020 season, partnering with Jake Dixon. Vierge once again had an underwhelming season, with no podium finishes, a fourth place being his best in Rimini, and one pole position, which he achieved at Catalunya. He finished the season tenth in the standings with 79 points, but 35 points ahead of Dixon.

Vierge stayed with Sepang Racing Team for the 2021 season, once again partnering Jake Dixon. He had one podium finish during the season, a third place from Catalunya, and finished 11th in the standings again, with 93 points.

=== Superbike World Championship ===
In September, Vierge and Honda announced that he would be competing in the Superbike World Championship for 2022, replacing Leon Haslam. He would be partnered by fellow MotoGP outcast Iker Lecuona, on the factory Honda ride.

=== Suzuka 8 Hours ===
In 2025, Vierge was unable to compete in the Suzuka 8 Hours due to a work visa issue. Japanese authorities refused to grant a work visa to Vierge, who was scheduled to compete in the Suzuka 8 Hours as a replacement for his injured Honda WSBK teammate, Iker Lecuona.

== Career statistics ==
=== FIM CEV Moto3 Junior World Championship ===
==== Races by year ====
(key) (Races in bold indicate pole position, races in italics indicate fastest lap)

Year	Bike	1	2	3	4	5	6	7	8	9	Pos	Pts
2012	Honda	JER; Ret	NAV; 10	ARA; 13	CAT; 12	ALB1; 5	ALB2; 9	VAL; Ret			15th	31
2013	Honda	CAT1; Ret	CAT2; 12	ARA; Ret	ALB1; Ret	ALB2; 15	NAV; Ret	VAL1; 12	VAL2; Ret	JER; 17	27th	9

=== FIM CEV Moto2 European Championship ===
==== Races by year ====
(key) (Races in bold indicate pole position, races in italics indicate fastest lap)

Year	Bike	1	2	3	4	5	6	7	8	9	10	11	Pos	Pts
2014	Tech 3	JER; Ret	ARA1; Ret	ARA2; 3	CAT; Ret	ALB; 3	NAV1; 1	NAV2; 3	ALG1; 2	ALG2; 9	VAL; 5		4th	111
2015	Tech 3	**ALG1**; 2	**ALG2**; 1	CAT; Ret	ARA1; 3	ARA2; 2	**ALB**; 1	NAV1; 1	NAV2; 2	JER; 1	**VAL1**; 1	**VAL2**; 1	2nd	226

=== Grand Prix motorcycle racing ===
==== By season ====
Season	Class	Motorcycle	Team	Race	Win	Podium	Pole	FLap	Pts	Plcd
2015	Moto2	Tech 3	Tech 3	9	0	0	0	0	0	NC
2016	Moto2	Tech 3	Tech 3 Racing	18	0	0	0	0	37	20th
2017	Moto2	Tech 3	Tech 3 Racing	15	0	1	0	0	98	11th
2018	Moto2	Kalex	Dynavolt Intact GP	17	0	2	1	2	131	11th
2019	Moto2	Kalex	EG 0,0 Marc VDS	18	0	0	1	0	81	13th
2020	Moto2	Kalex	Petronas Sprinta Racing	15	0	0	1	0	79	10th
2021	Moto2	Kalex	Petronas Sprinta Racing	18	0	1	0	0	93	11th
Total				**110**	**0**	**4**	**3**	**2**	**519**	

==== By class ====
Class	Seasons	1st GP	1st pod	1st win	Race	Win	Podiums	Pole	FLap	Pts	WChmp
Moto2	2015–2021	2015 Indianapolis	2017 Japan		110	0	4	3	2	519	0
Total	2015–2021				**110**	**0**	**4**	**3**	**2**	**519**	**0**

==== Races by year ====
(key) (Races in bold indicate pole position, races in italics indicate fastest lap)

Year	Class	Bike	1	2	3	4	5	6	7	8	9	10	11	12	13	14	15	16	17	18	19	Pos	Pts
2015	Moto2	Tech 3	QAT	AME	ARG	SPA	FRA	ITA	CAT	NED	GER	INP; Ret	CZE; Ret	GBR; 22	RSM; 23	ARA; 16	JPN; Ret	AUS; 19	MAL; 22	VAL; 17		NC	0
2016	Moto2	Tech 3	QAT; Ret	ARG; 14	AME; 20	SPA; Ret	FRA; 15	ITA; Ret	CAT; 20	NED; 17	GER; Ret	AUT; 16	CZE; 12	GBR; 13	RSM; 12	ARA; 17	JPN; 11	AUS; 10	MAL; 8	VAL; 12		20th	37
2017	Moto2	Tech 3	QAT; 9	ARG; 5	AME; 9	SPA; Ret	FRA; 9	ITA; DNS	CAT; 8	NED; DNS	GER	CZE; 5	AUT; Ret	GBR; 12	RSM; 14	ARA; 14	JPN; 2	AUS; 5	MAL; 8	VAL; Ret		11th	98
2018	Moto2	Kalex	QAT; 8	**ARG**; 2	AME; Ret	SPA; 4	FRA; 5	ITA; 9	CAT; 5	NED; Ret	GER; 7	CZE; 5	AUT; DNS	GBR; C	RSM; 10	ARA; Ret	THA; 11	JPN; 7	AUS; 3	MAL; 11	VAL; Ret	11th	131
2019	Moto2	Kalex	QAT; 10	**ARG**; DNS	AME; Ret	SPA; 6	FRA; 5	ITA; 12	CAT; 8	NED; Ret	GER; Ret	CZE; 24	AUT; Ret	GBR; 10	RSM; 8	ARA; 10	THA; Ret	JPN; Ret	AUS; Ret	MAL; 4	VAL; 7	13th	81
2020	Moto2	Kalex	QAT; 9	SPA; 10	ANC; 8	CZE; 12	AUT; 5	STY; 6	RSM; 4	EMI; Ret	CAT; Ret	FRA; Ret	ARA; 16	TER; 12	**EUR**; 9	VAL; 13	POR; 10					10th	79
2021	Moto2	Kalex	QAT; Ret	DOH; 9	POR; 7	SPA; 6	FRA; Ret	ITA; Ret	CAT; 3	GER; Ret	NED; 8	STY; 9	AUT; 14	GBR; 8	ARA; Ret	RSM; 8	AME; 8	EMI; Ret	ALR; Ret	VAL; 6		11th	93

=== Superbike World Championship ===
==== By season ====
Season	Motorcycle	Team	Number	Race	Win	Podium	Pole	FLap	Pts	Plcd
2022	Honda CBR1000RR-R	Team HRC	97	36	0	0	0	0	164	10th
2023	Honda CBR1000RR-R	Team HRC	97	36	0	1	0	0	149	10th
2024	Honda CBR1000RR-R	Team HRC	97	36	0	0	0	0	137	11th
2025	Honda CBR1000RR-R	Team HRC	97	36	0	0	0	0	185	7th
2026	Yamaha YZF-R1	PATA Maxus Yamaha	97	5	0	0	0	0	15*	14th*
Total				**149**	**0**	**1**	**0**	**0**	**650**	

==== Races by year ====
(key) (Races in bold indicate pole position) (Races in italics indicate fastest lap)

Year	Bike	1			2			3			4			5			6			7			8			9			10			11			12			Pos	Pts
Year	Bike	R1	SR	R2	R1	SR	R2	R1	SR	R2	R1	SR	R2	R1	SR	R2	R1	SR	R2	R1	SR	R2	R1	SR	R2	R1	SR	R2	R1	SR	R2	R1	SR	R2	R1	SR	R2	Pos	Pts
2022	Honda	SPA; 7	SPA; 9	SPA; 8	NED; 11	NED; 12	NED; 9	POR; 5	POR; Ret	POR; 9	ITA; 7	ITA; 4	ITA; Ret	GBR; 13	GBR; 15	GBR; 13	CZE; 15	CZE; 10	CZE; 7	FRA; 13	FRA; Ret	FRA; Ret	SPA; 12	SPA; 7	SPA; 6	POR; 8	POR; 10	POR; 8	ARG; 9	ARG; 8	ARG; 6	INA; 6	INA; 9	INA; 7	AUS; 8	AUS; 8	AUS; Ret	10th	164
2023	Honda	AUS; 7	AUS; 12	AUS; 11	INA; 7	INA; 6	INA; 3	NED; 11	NED; 9	NED; Ret	SPA; 8	SPA; 9	SPA; 6	ITA; 10	ITA; 8	ITA; 5	GBR; 11	GBR; 14	GBR; Ret	ITA; 12	ITA; 19	ITA; 14	CZE; 17	CZE; Ret	CZE; 9	FRA; 12	FRA; 9	FRA; 9	SPA; 12	SPA; 7	SPA; 8	POR; 10	POR; 9	POR; 15	SPA; 10	SPA; 10	SPA; 13	10th	149
2024	Honda	AUS; 10	AUS; 12	AUS; 13	SPA; 14	SPA; 15	SPA; 14	NED; 10	NED; 12	NED; 10	ITA; 16	ITA; 13	ITA; Ret	GBR; Ret	GBR; 15	GBR; 15	CZE; 14	CZE; Ret	CZE; 11	POR; 13	POR; 7	POR; 9	FRA; 7	FRA; 5	FRA; 7	ITA; 6	ITA; 8	ITA; 8	SPA; 8	SPA; 9	SPA; 10	POR; 8	POR; 7	POR; 6	SPA; 7	SPA; Ret	SPA; 13	11th	137
2025	Honda	AUS; 11	AUS; 12	AUS; 11	POR; 5	POR; 8	POR; Ret	NED; 6	NED; Ret	NED; 12	ITA; 5	ITA; 5	ITA; 7	CZE; 9	CZE; 8	CZE; Ret	EMI; 11	EMI; 10	EMI; 9	GBR; 11	GBR; 13	GBR; 14	HUN; 8	HUN; 5	HUN; 7	FRA; NC	FRA; 9	FRA; 7	ARA; 9	ARA; 10	ARA; 10	POR; 7	POR; 7	POR; 6	SPA; 5	SPA; 4	SPA; 5	7th	185
2026	Yamaha	AUS; Ret	AUS; DNS	AUS; Ret	POR; 6	POR; 7	POR; 14	NED	NED	NED	HUN	HUN	HUN	CZE	CZE	CZE	ARA	ARA	ARA	EMI	EMI	EMI	GBR	GBR	GBR	FRA	FRA	FRA	ITA	ITA	ITA	POR	POR	POR	SPA	SPA	SPA	14th*	15*

* Season still in progress.

== Suzuka 8 Hours results ==
Year	Team	Riders	Bike	Pos
2023	(Japan) Honda Team HRC	(Japan) Tetsuta Nagashima (Japan) Takumi Takahashi	Honda CBR1000RR-R SP	1st
