= 2018 Australian motorcycle Grand Prix =

(Australia) 2018 Australian Grand Prix
Race details
- Race 17 of 19 races in the 2018 Grand Prix motorcycle racing season
- Date: 28 October 2018
- Official name: Michelin Australian Motorcycle Grand Prix
- Location: Phillip Island Grand Prix Circuit, Phillip Island, Victoria, Australia
- Course: Permanent racing facility; 4.448 km (2.764 mi)

MotoGP
Pole position
Rider	(Spain) Marc Márquez	Honda
Time	1:29.199	
Fastest lap
Rider	(Spain) Maverick Viñales	Yamaha
Time	1:29.632 on lap 10	
Podium
First	(Spain) Maverick Viñales	Yamaha
Second	(Italy) Andrea Iannone	Suzuki
Third	(Italy) Andrea Dovizioso	Ducati

Moto2
Pole position
Rider	(Italy) Mattia Pasini	Kalex
Time	1:33.368	
Fastest lap
Rider	(Spain) Augusto Fernández	Kalex
Time	1:33.715 on lap 11	
Podium
First	(South Africa) Brad Binder	KTM
Second	(Spain) Joan Mir	Kalex
Third	(Spain) Xavi Vierge	Kalex

Moto3
Pole position
Rider	(Spain) Jorge Martín	Honda
Time	1:36.591	
Fastest lap
Rider	(Italy) Lorenzo Dalla Porta	Honda
Time	1:36.826 on lap 4	
Podium
First	(Spain) Albert Arenas	KTM
Second	(Italy) Fabio Di Giannantonio	Honda
Third	(Italy) Celestino Vietti	KTM

The 2018 Australian motorcycle Grand Prix was the seventeenth round of the 2018 MotoGP season. It was held at the Phillip Island Grand Prix Circuit in Phillip Island on 28 October 2018.

== Classification ==
=== MotoGP ===
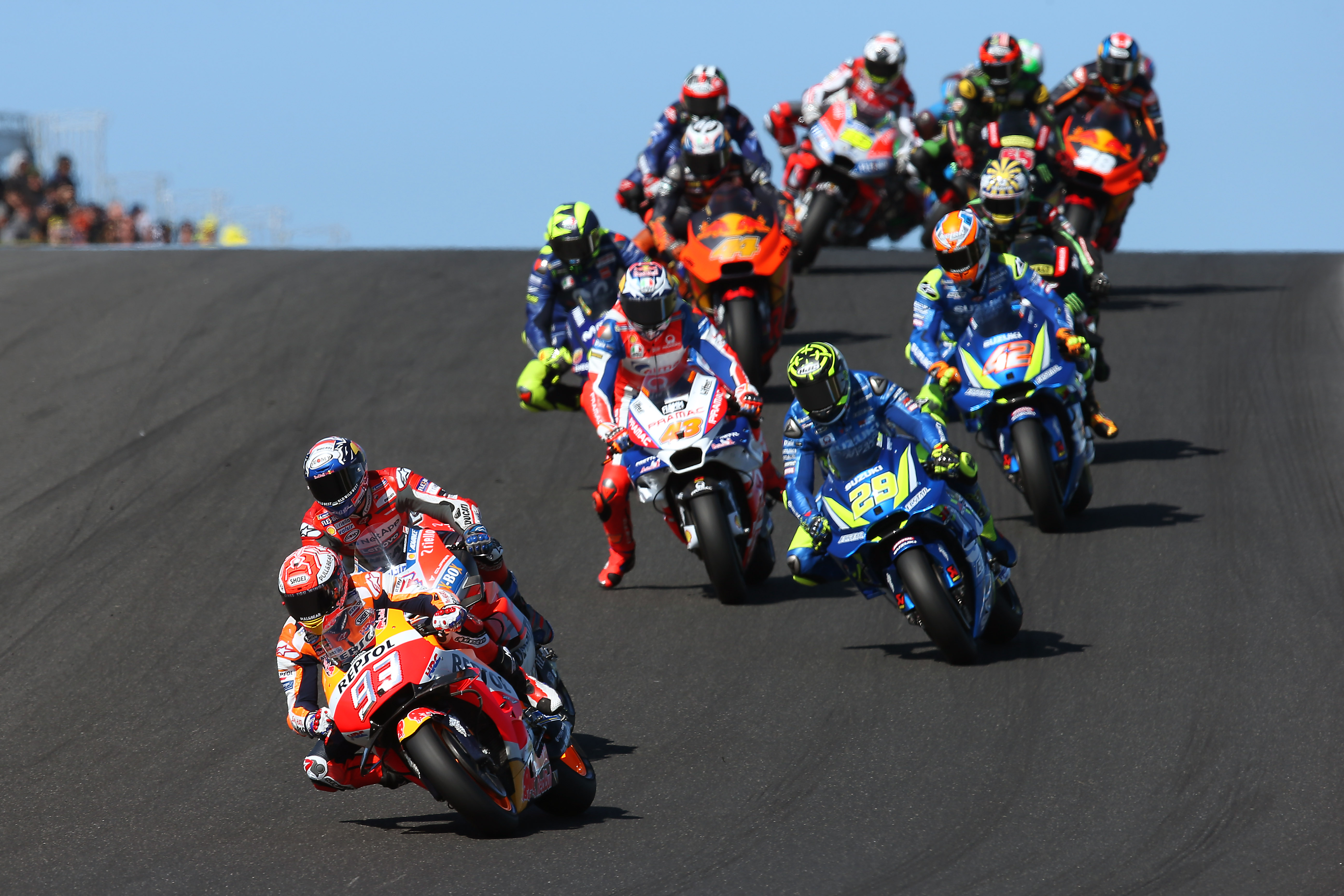
Marc Márquez leads the pack 2018 Phillip Island

Pos.	No.	Rider	Team	Manufacturer	Laps	Time/Retired	Grid	Points
1	25	(Spain) Maverick Viñales	Movistar Yamaha MotoGP	Yamaha	27	40:51.081	2	25
2	29	(Italy) Andrea Iannone	Team Suzuki Ecstar	Suzuki	27	+1.543	4	20
3	4	(Italy) Andrea Dovizioso	Ducati Team	Ducati	27	+1.832	9	16
4	19	(Spain) Álvaro Bautista	Ducati Team	Ducati	27	+4.072	12	13
5	42	(Spain) Álex Rins	Team Suzuki Ecstar	Suzuki	27	+5.017	5	11
6	46	(Italy) Valentino Rossi	Movistar Yamaha MotoGP	Yamaha	27	+5.132	7	10
7	43	(Australia) Jack Miller	Alma Pramac Racing	Ducati	27	+6.756	6	9
8	21	(Italy) Franco Morbidelli	EG 0,0 Marc VDS	Honda	27	+21.805	15	8
9	41	(Spain) Aleix Espargaró	Aprilia Racing Team Gresini	Aprilia	27	+22.904	19	7
10	38	(United Kingdom) Bradley Smith	Red Bull KTM Factory Racing	KTM	27	+22.940	16	6
11	17	(Czech Republic) Karel Abraham	Ángel Nieto Team	Ducati	27	+34.386	13	5
12	9	(Italy) Danilo Petrucci	Alma Pramac Racing	Ducati	27	+35.025	8	4
13	45	(United Kingdom) Scott Redding	Aprilia Racing Team Gresini	Aprilia	27	+36.348	22	3
14	30	(Japan) Takaaki Nakagami	LCR Honda Idemitsu	Honda	27	+36.389	14	2
15	10	(Belgium) Xavier Siméon	Reale Avintia Racing	Ducati	27	+44.214	17	1
16	12	(Switzerland) Thomas Lüthi	EG 0,0 Marc VDS	Honda	27	+48.226	20	
17	81	(Spain) Jordi Torres	Reale Avintia Racing	Ducati	27	+1:04.965	21	
18	7	(Australia) Mike Jones	Ángel Nieto Team	Ducati	27	+1:19.817	23	
Ret	44	(Spain) Pol Espargaró	Red Bull KTM Factory Racing	KTM	22	Rear Tyre Wear	11	
Ret	55	(Malaysia) Hafizh Syahrin	Monster Yamaha Tech 3	Yamaha	18	Accident	10	
Ret	26	(Spain) Dani Pedrosa	Repsol Honda Team	Honda	11	Accident	18	
Ret	93	(Spain) Marc Márquez	Repsol Honda Team	Honda	5	Collision Damage	1	
Ret	5	(France) Johann Zarco	Monster Yamaha Tech 3	Yamaha	5	Collision	3	
DNS	35	(United Kingdom) Cal Crutchlow	LCR Honda Castrol	Honda		Did not start		
Sources:

- Cal Crutchlow suffered a broken ankle in a crash during practice and withdrew from the event.

=== Moto2 ===
Pos.	No.	Rider	Manufacturer	Laps	Time/Retired	Grid	Points
1	41	(South Africa) Brad Binder	KTM	25	39:23.427	5	25
2	36	(Spain) Joan Mir	Kalex	25	+0.036	14	20
3	97	(Spain) Xavi Vierge	Kalex	25	+0.949	3	16
4	40	(Spain) Augusto Fernández	Kalex	25	+0.957	13	13
5	10	(Italy) Luca Marini	Kalex	25	+1.767	7	11
6	77	(Switzerland) Dominique Aegerter	KTM	25	+2.482	4	10
7	73	(Spain) Álex Márquez	Kalex	25	+3.759	9	9
8	2	(Switzerland) Jesko Raffin	Kalex	25	+4.850	10	8
9	23	(Germany) Marcel Schrötter	Kalex	25	+6.250	2	7
10	20	(France) Fabio Quartararo	Speed Up	25	+7.453	6	6
11	44	(Portugal) Miguel Oliveira	KTM	25	+8.675	19	5
12	42	(Italy) Francesco Bagnaia	Kalex	25	+9.725	16	4
13	45	(Japan) Tetsuta Nagashima	Kalex	25	+9.787	20	3
14	22	(United Kingdom) Sam Lowes	KTM	25	+11.209	18	2
15	57	(Spain) Edgar Pons	Speed Up	25	+14.076	21	1
16	89	(Malaysia) Khairul Idham Pawi	Kalex	25	+15.350	22	
17	4	(South Africa) Steven Odendaal	NTS	25	+15.396	25	
18	16	(United States) Joe Roberts	NTS	25	+23.230	23	
19	24	(Italy) Simone Corsi	Kalex	25	+33.736	24	
20	5	(Italy) Andrea Locatelli	Kalex	25	+42.324	17	
21	67	(Australia) Bryan Staring	Tech 3	25	+52.297	26	
22	7	(Italy) Lorenzo Baldassarri	Kalex	25	+1:03.888	11	
Ret	18	(Andorra) Xavi Cardelús	Kalex	14	Ankle Pain	30	
Ret	87	(Australia) Remy Gardner	Tech 3	13	Accident Damage	15	
Ret	9	(Spain) Jorge Navarro	Kalex	8	Accident	12	
Ret	27	(Spain) Iker Lecuona	KTM	6	Accident	8	
Ret	21	(Italy) Federico Fuligni	Kalex	6	Mechanical	28	
Ret	95	(France) Jules Danilo	Kalex	4	Accident	27	
Ret	32	(Spain) Isaac Viñales	Suter	4	Shoulder Pain	29	
Ret	54	(Italy) Mattia Pasini	Kalex	1	Accident	1	
DNS	62	(Italy) Stefano Manzi	Suter		Did not start		
DNS	66	(Finland) Niki Tuuli	Kalex		Did not start		
OFFICIAL MOTO2 REPORT

- Stefano Manzi suffered a wrist injury in a crash during qualifying and withdrew from the event.

=== Moto3 ===
Pos.	No.	Rider	Manufacturer	Laps	Time/Retired	Grid	Points
1	75	(Spain) Albert Arenas	KTM	23	37:48.073	11	25
2	21	(Italy) Fabio Di Giannantonio	Honda	23	+0.052	17	20
3	31	(Italy) Celestino Vietti	KTM	23	+0.059	21	16
4	24	(Japan) Tatsuki Suzuki	Honda	23	+0.081	23	13
5	88	(Spain) Jorge Martín	Honda	23	+0.099	1	11
6	44	(Spain) Arón Canet	Honda	23	+0.154	10	10
7	7	(Malaysia) Adam Norrodin	Honda	23	+0.188	13	9
8	33	(Italy) Enea Bastianini	Honda	23	+0.235	14	8
9	84	(Czech Republic) Jakub Kornfeil	KTM	23	+0.328	4	7
10	71	(Japan) Ayumu Sasaki	Honda	23	+0.406	3	6
11	72	(Spain) Alonso López	Honda	23	+0.575	16	5
12	40	(South Africa) Darryn Binder	KTM	23	+0.889	2	4
13	16	(Italy) Andrea Migno	KTM	23	+0.987	26	3
14	17	(United Kingdom) John McPhee	KTM	23	+0.989	18	2
15	65	(Germany) Philipp Öttl	KTM	23	+2.148	6	1
16	55	(Italy) Yari Montella	Honda	23	+34.700	22	
17	81	(Italy) Stefano Nepa	KTM	23	+34.969	24	
18	41	(Thailand) Nakarin Atiratphuvapat	Honda	23	+39.367	25	
19	27	(Japan) Kaito Toba	Honda	23	+48.054	12	
20	77	(Spain) Vicente Pérez	KTM	23	+48.970	27 (Note: 6-place grid penalty.)	
Ret	14	(Italy) Tony Arbolino	Honda	21	Collision	7	
Ret	10	(Italy) Dennis Foggia	KTM	21	Collision	9	
Ret	42	(Spain) Marcos Ramírez	KTM	13	Collision	8	
Ret	5	(Spain) Jaume Masiá	KTM	13	Collision	19	
Ret	48	(Italy) Lorenzo Dalla Porta	Honda	12	Accident	20	
Ret	12	(Italy) Marco Bezzecchi	KTM	10	Collision	15	
Ret	19	(Argentina) Gabriel Rodrigo	KTM	10	Collision	5	
DNS	22	(Japan) Kazuki Masaki	KTM		Did not start		
OFFICIAL MOTO3 REPORT

- Kazuki Masaki suffered a broken left hand in a crash during practice and withdrew from the event.

== Championship standings after the race ==
- **Bold text** indicates the World Champions.

=== MotoGP ===
Pos.	Rider	Points
1	(Spain) **Marc Márquez**	296
2	(Italy) Andrea Dovizioso	210
3	(Italy) Valentino Rossi	195
4	(Spain) Maverick Viñales	180
5	(United Kingdom) Cal Crutchlow	148
6	(Italy) Danilo Petrucci	137
7	(France) Johann Zarco	133
8	(Italy) Andrea Iannone	133
9	(Spain) Jorge Lorenzo	130
10	(Spain) Álex Rins	129

=== Moto2 ===
Pos.	Rider	Points
1	(Italy) Francesco Bagnaia	288
2	(Portugal) Miguel Oliveira	252
3	(South Africa) Brad Binder	193
4	(Italy) Lorenzo Baldassarri	152
5	(Spain) Joan Mir	149
6	(Spain) Álex Márquez	148
7	(Germany) Marcel Schrötter	131
8	(Spain) Xavi Vierge	126
9	(Italy) Luca Marini	122
10	(France) Fabio Quartararo	117

=== Moto3 ===
Pos.	Rider	Points
1	(Spain) Jorge Martín	215
2	(Italy) Marco Bezzecchi	203
3	(Italy) Fabio Di Giannantonio	195
4	(Italy) Enea Bastianini	150
5	(Italy) Lorenzo Dalla Porta	131
6	(Spain) Arón Canet	128
7	(Argentina) Gabriel Rodrigo	116
8	(Czech Republic) Jakub Kornfeil	115
9	(Spain) Albert Arenas	94
10	(Spain) Marcos Ramírez	90

== Notes ==
Previous race: 2018 Japanese Grand Prix	FIM Grand Prix World Championship; 2018 season	Next race: 2018 Malaysian Grand Prix
Previous race: 2017 Australian Grand Prix	Australian motorcycle Grand Prix	Next race: 2019 Australian Grand Prix
