= 2016 Australian motorcycle Grand Prix =

(Australia) 2016 Australian Grand Prix
Race details
- Race 16 of 18 races in the 2016 Grand Prix motorcycle racing season
- Date: 23 October 2016
- Official name: Michelin Australian Motorcycle Grand Prix
- Location: Phillip Island Grand Prix Circuit
- Course: Permanent racing facility; 4.448 km (2.764 mi)

MotoGP
Pole position
Rider	(Spain) Marc Márquez	Honda
Time	1:30.189	
Fastest lap
Rider	(United Kingdom) Cal Crutchlow	Honda
Time	1:29.494 on lap 8	
Podium
First	(United Kingdom) Cal Crutchlow	Honda
Second	(Italy) Valentino Rossi	Yamaha
Third	(Spain) Maverick Viñales	Suzuki

Moto2
Pole position
Rider	(Switzerland) Thomas Lüthi	Kalex
Time	1:33.992	
Fastest lap
Rider	(Italy) Franco Morbidelli	Kalex
Time	1:33.414 on lap 2	
Podium
First	(Switzerland) Thomas Lüthi	Kalex
Second	(Italy) Franco Morbidelli	Kalex
Third	(Germany) Sandro Cortese	Kalex

Moto3
Pole position
Rider	(South Africa) Brad Binder	KTM
Time	1:37.696	
Fastest lap
Rider	(Italy) Andrea Locatelli	KTM
Time	1:37.335 on lap 5 (first part)	
Podium
First	(South Africa) Brad Binder	KTM
Second	(Italy) Andrea Locatelli	KTM
Third	(Spain) Arón Canet	Honda

The 2016 Australian motorcycle Grand Prix was the sixteenth round of the 2016 Grand Prix motorcycle racing season. It was held at the Phillip Island Grand Prix Circuit in Phillip Island on 23 October 2016.

This race marked 2006 MotoGP world champion Nicky Hayden's final start in Grand Prix motorcycle racing before succumbing to his injuries after a cycling accident on 22 May 2017. Hayden was replacing Dani Pedrosa for this race.

== Classification ==
=== MotoGP ===
Pos.	No.	Rider	Team	Manufacturer	Laps	Time/Retired	Grid	Points
1	35	(United Kingdom) Cal Crutchlow	LCR Honda	Honda	27	40:48.543	2	25
2	46	(Italy) Valentino Rossi	Movistar Yamaha MotoGP	Yamaha	27	+4.218	15	20
3	25	(Spain) Maverick Viñales	Team Suzuki Ecstar	Suzuki	27	+5.309	13	16
4	04	(Italy) Andrea Dovizioso	Ducati Team	Ducati	27	+9.157	9	13
5	44	(Spain) Pol Espargaró	Monster Yamaha Tech 3	Yamaha	27	+14.299	3	11
6	99	(Spain) Jorge Lorenzo	Movistar Yamaha MotoGP	Yamaha	27	+20.125	12	10
7	45	(United Kingdom) Scott Redding	Octo Pramac Yakhnich	Ducati	27	+28.369	11	9
8	38	(United Kingdom) Bradley Smith	Monster Yamaha Tech 3	Yamaha	27	+28.781	14	8
9	9	(Italy) Danilo Petrucci	Octo Pramac Yakhnich	Ducati	27	+28.792	6	7
10	43	(Australia) Jack Miller	Estrella Galicia 0,0 Marc VDS	Honda	27	+28.815	5	6
11	6	(Germany) Stefan Bradl	Aprilia Racing Team Gresini	Aprilia	27	+31.809	8	5
12	19	(Spain) Álvaro Bautista	Aprilia Racing Team Gresini	Aprilia	27	+47.734	18	4
13	68	(Colombia) Yonny Hernández	Pull & Bear Aspar Team	Ducati	27	+47.749	17	3
14	50	(Republic of Ireland) Eugene Laverty	Pull & Bear Aspar Team	Ducati	27	+54.311	16	2
15	7	(Australia) Mike Jones	Avintia Racing	Ducati	27	+55.875	19	1
16	53	(Spain) Tito Rabat	Estrella Galicia 0,0 Marc VDS	Honda	27	+1:06.395	21	
17	69	(United States) Nicky Hayden	Repsol Honda Team	Honda	27	+1:22.604	7	
Ret	8	(Spain) Héctor Barberá	Ducati Team	Ducati	24	Accident	10	
Ret	41	(Spain) Aleix Espargaró	Team Suzuki Ecstar	Suzuki	22	Accident	4	
Ret	93	(Spain) Marc Márquez	Repsol Honda Team	Honda	9	Accident	1	
Ret	76	(France) Loris Baz	Avintia Racing	Ducati	0	Electronics	20	

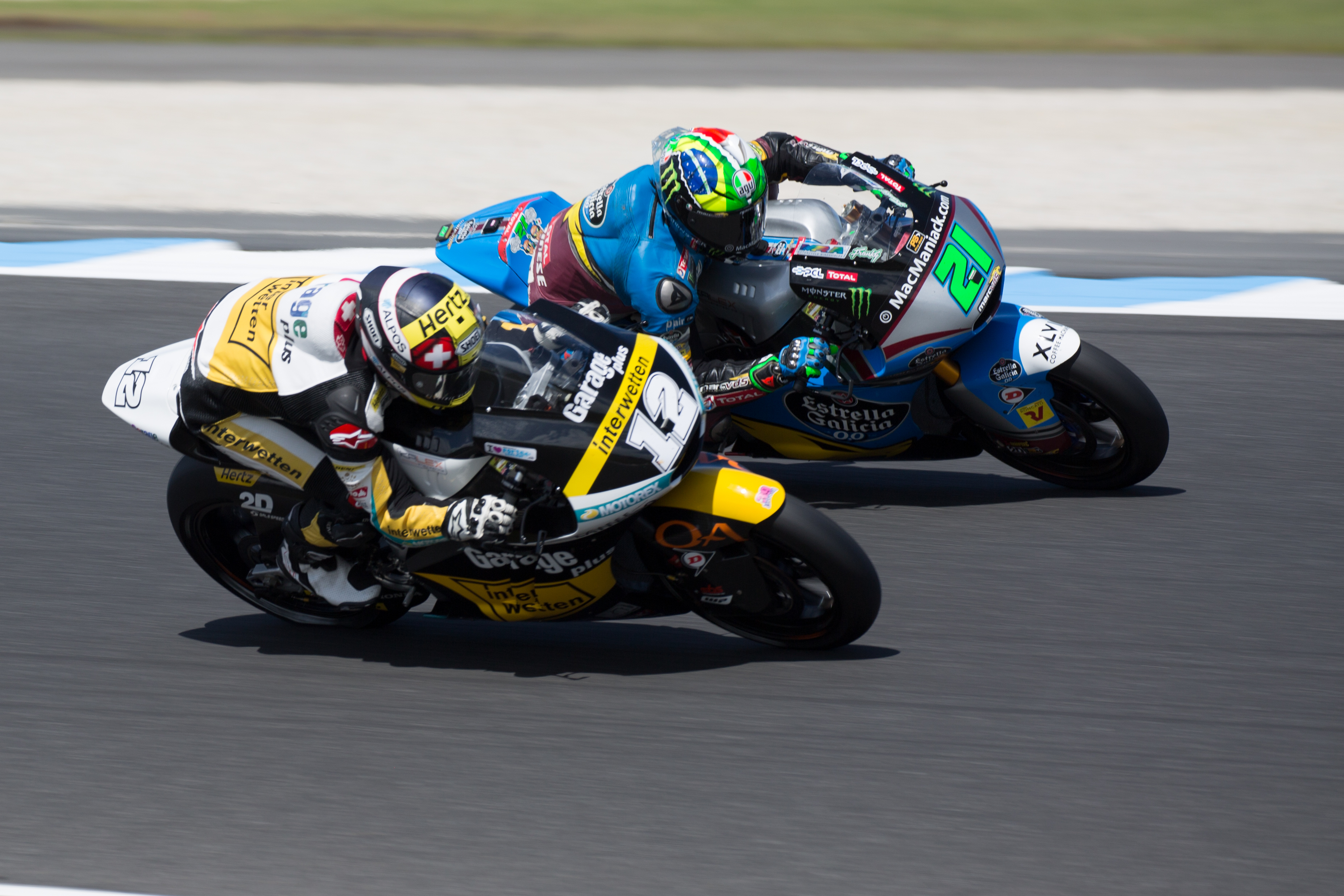
Thomas Lüthi, battling with Franco Morbidelli during the Moto2 race. Lüthi went on to win the race, with Morbidelli finishing second.

=== Moto2 ===
Pos.	No.	Rider	Manufacturer	Laps	Time/Retired	Grid	Points
1	12	(Switzerland) Thomas Lüthi	Kalex	25	39:15.891	1	25
2	21	(Italy) Franco Morbidelli	Kalex	25	+0.010	9	20
3	11	(Germany) Sandro Cortese	Kalex	25	+0.530	4	16
4	7	(Italy) Lorenzo Baldassarri	Kalex	25	+3.081	8	13
5	30	(Japan) Takaaki Nakagami	Kalex	25	+3.815	12	11
6	94	(Germany) Jonas Folger	Kalex	25	+11.087	6	10
7	24	(Italy) Simone Corsi	Speed Up	25	+13.291	13	9
8	49	(Spain) Axel Pons	Kalex	25	+16.411	18	8
9	23	(Germany) Marcel Schrötter	Kalex	25	+17.650	11	7
10	97	(Spain) Xavi Vierge	Tech 3	25	+17.665	7	6
11	19	(Belgium) Xavier Siméon	Speed Up	25	+17.762	20	5
12	5	(France) Johann Zarco	Kalex	25	+17.796	10	4
13	2	(Switzerland) Jesko Raffin	Kalex	25	+31.575	5	3
14	57	(Spain) Edgar Pons	Kalex	25	+34.670	23	2
15	14	(Thailand) Ratthapark Wilairot	Kalex	25	+40.454	16	1
16	10	(Italy) Luca Marini	Kalex	25	+47.707	17	
17	70	(Switzerland) Robin Mulhauser	Kalex	25	+1:34.470	26	
18	93	(Malaysia) Ramdan Rosli	Kalex	24	+1 lap	25	
Ret	20	(Italy) Alessandro Nocco	Kalex	23	Tyre	27	
Ret	54	(Italy) Mattia Pasini	Kalex	22	Accident Damage	2	
Ret	52	(United Kingdom) Danny Kent	Kalex	22	Accident	21	
Ret	87	(Australia) Remy Gardner	Kalex	13	Accident	22	
Ret	60	(Spain) Julián Simón	Speed Up	9	Accident	14	
Ret	27	(Spain) Iker Lecuona	Kalex	9	Accident	24	
Ret	40	(Spain) Álex Rins	Kalex	6	Accident	15	
Ret	22	(United Kingdom) Sam Lowes	Kalex	2	Accident	3	
Ret	55	(Malaysia) Hafizh Syahrin	Kalex	0	Accident	19	
DNS	73	(Spain) Álex Márquez	Kalex		Did not start		
DNS	32	(Spain) Isaac Viñales	Tech 3		Did not start		
OFFICIAL MOTO2 REPORT

- Álex Márquez withdrew from the race after injuries to his wrist and back suffered in a crash during warm-up.
- Isaac Viñales suffered a shoulder injury in a crash during qualifying.

=== Moto3 ===
The race, scheduled to be run for 23 laps, was red-flagged after 5 laps due to accident and was later restarted for 10 laps.

Pos.	No.	Rider	Manufacturer	Laps	Time/Retired	Grid	Points
1	41	(South Africa) Brad Binder	KTM	10	16:22.009	1	25
2	55	(Italy) Andrea Locatelli	KTM	10	+5.937	14	20
3	44	(Spain) Arón Canet	Honda	10	+9.594	20	16
4	40	(South Africa) Darryn Binder	Mahindra	10	+9.642	6	13
5	11	(Belgium) Livio Loi	Honda	10	+9.680	4	11
6	88	(Spain) Jorge Martín	Mahindra	10	+9.750	8	10
7	42	(Spain) Marcos Ramírez	Mahindra	10	+9.996	29	9
8	76	(Japan) Hiroki Ono	Honda	10	+10.115	28	8
9	95	(France) Jules Danilo	Honda	10	+10.142	15	7
10	64	(Netherlands) Bo Bendsneyder	KTM	10	+10.358	10	6
11	7	(Malaysia) Adam Norrodin	Honda	10	+10.447	26	5
12	20	(France) Fabio Quartararo	KTM	10	+10.569	34	4
13	24	(Japan) Tatsuki Suzuki	Mahindra	10	+10.682	23	3
14	65	(Germany) Philipp Öttl	KTM	10	+10.979	25	2
15	6	(Spain) María Herrera	KTM	10	+13.763	13	1
16	12	(Spain) Albert Arenas	Peugeot	10	+13.821	24	
17	77	(Italy) Lorenzo Petrarca	Mahindra	10	+28.297	31	
18	3	(Italy) Fabio Spiranelli	Mahindra	10	+42.036	30	
19	48	(Italy) Lorenzo Dalla Porta	KTM	10	+50.454	27	
20	14	(Australia) Matt Barton	FTR Honda	10	+1:23.446	33	
Ret	19	(Argentina) Gabriel Rodrigo	KTM	9	Accident	3	
Ret	9	(Spain) Jorge Navarro	Honda	9	Accident	11	
Ret	43	(Italy) Stefano Valtulini	Mahindra	8	Accident	32	
Ret	23	(Italy) Niccolò Antonelli	Honda	0	Accident	17	
Ret	8	(Italy) Nicolò Bulega	KTM	0	Did not restart	2	
Ret	16	(Italy) Andrea Migno	KTM	0	Did not restart	5	
Ret	17	(United Kingdom) John McPhee	Peugeot	0	Did not restart	7	
Ret	36	(Spain) Joan Mir	KTM	0	Did not restart	9	
Ret	21	(Italy) Francesco Bagnaia	Mahindra	0	Did not restart	12	
Ret	89	(Malaysia) Khairul Idham Pawi	Honda	0	Did not restart	16	
Ret	33	(Italy) Enea Bastianini	Honda	0	Did not restart	18	
Ret	4	(Italy) Fabio Di Giannantonio	Honda	0	Did not restart	19	
Ret	58	(Spain) Juan Francisco Guevara	KTM	0	Did not restart	21	
Ret	84	(Czech Republic) Jakub Kornfeil	Honda	0	Did not restart	22	
OFFICIAL MOTO3 REPORT

== Championship standings after the race (MotoGP) ==
Below are the standings for the top five riders and constructors after round sixteen has concluded.

Riders' Championship standings

Pos.	Rider	Points
1	(Spain) Marc Marquez	273
2	(Italy) Valentino Rossi	216
3	(Spain) Jorge Lorenzo	192
4	(Spain) Maverick Vinales	181
5	(Spain) Dani Pedrosa	155

Constructors' Championship standings

Pos.	Constructor	Points
1	(Japan) Honda	341
2	(Japan) Yamaha	308
3	(Italy) Ducati	220
4	(Japan) Suzuki	187
5	(Italy) Aprilia	86

- Note: Only the top five positions are included for both sets of standings.

Previous race: 2016 Japanese Grand Prix	FIM Grand Prix World Championship; 2016 season	Next race: 2016 Malaysian Grand Prix
Previous race: 2015 Australian Grand Prix	Australian motorcycle Grand Prix	Next race: 2017 Australian Grand Prix
