= 2014 FIM CEV Moto2 European Championship =

2014 FIM CEV Moto2 European Championship
Previous:	2013	Next:	2015
Support series: FIM CEV Moto3 Junior World Championship; FIM CEV Superbike European Championship

The 2014 FIM CEV Moto2 European Championship was the fifth CEV Moto2 season. The season was held over 10 races at 7 meetings, began on 6 April at Jerez and finished on 16 November at Valencia.

== Calendar ==
Round	Date	Circuit	Pole position	Fastest lap	Race winner	Winning constructor
1	6 April	(Spain) Jerez	(Argentina) Sebastián Porto	(Switzerland) Jesko Raffin	(Spain) Edgar Pons	(Germany) Kalex
2	8 June	(Spain) Aragón	(Switzerland) Jesko Raffin	(Switzerland) Jesko Raffin	(Switzerland) Jesko Raffin	(Germany) Kalex
2	8 June	(Spain) Aragón	(Switzerland) Jesko Raffin	(Switzerland) Jesko Raffin	(Switzerland) Jesko Raffin	(Germany) Kalex
3	22 June	(Spain) Catalunya	(Germany) Florian Alt	(Spain) Xavi Vierge	(Switzerland) Jesko Raffin	(Germany) Kalex
4	6 July	(Spain) Albacete	(Switzerland) Jesko Raffin	(Switzerland) Jesko Raffin	(Switzerland) Jesko Raffin	(Germany) Kalex
5	7 September	(Spain) Navarra	(Spain) Xavi Vierge	(South Africa) Steven Odendaal	(Spain) Xavi Vierge	(France) Tech 3
5	7 September	(Spain) Navarra	(Spain) Xavi Vierge	(France) Alan Techer	(Switzerland) Jesko Raffin	(Germany) Kalex
6	1 November	(Portugal) Algarve	(Spain) Xavi Vierge	(South Africa) Steven Odendaal	(Spain) Florian Alt	(Germany) Kalex
6	1 November	(Portugal) Algarve	(Spain) Xavi Vierge	(South Africa) Steven Odendaal	(Spain) Edgar Pons	(Germany) Kalex
7	15 November	(Spain) Valencia	(Spain) Xavi Vierge	(Spain) Edgar Pons	(Switzerland) Jesko Raffin	(Germany) Kalex

== Entry list ==
Team	Bike	No.	Rider	Rounds
Moto2
(Spain) MR Griful	MVR	3	(Spain) Diego Pérez Zuasti	2-7
(Spain) MR Griful	MVR	54	(United Kingdom) Marcus Woodbine	2-4
(Spain) MR Griful	MVR	59	(Spain) Pedro Rodríguez	2
(Spain) MR Griful	MVR	74	(Argentina) Andrés González	All
(Russia) Motorrika	FTR	7	(Russia) Anton Eremin	6-7
(Russia) Motorrika	FTR	75	(Russia) Anton Eremin	2-5
(Spain) Pons Racing	Kalex	10	(Switzerland) Jesko Raffin	All
(Spain) Pons Racing	Kalex	57	(Spain) Edgar Pons	All
(Spain) PL Racing	Suter	15	(Spain) Santiago Mangas	All
(Spain) PL Racing	Suter	34	(Argentina) Ezequiel Iturrioz	1
(Spain) Team Stratos	Ariane	17	(Spain) Russell Gómez	1-6
(Spain) Team Stratos	Ariane	55	(Spain) Alejandro Medina	2-7
(Spain) Team Stratos	Ariane	70	(Italy) Luca Vitali	All
(Spain) Cardelús-BST	Suter	18	(Switzerland) Bastien Chesaux	All
(Spain) TSR Motorsport	Kalex	19	(Argentina) Sebastián Porto	1-4
(Indonesia) Dimas Abirawa Star Racing Team	FTR	20	(Indonesia) Dimas Ekky Pratama	1
GPD Engineering Spain	GPD	21	(Spain) Daniel Arroyo	2
(Italy) Team Ciatti	Suter	22	(Italy) Federico Fuligni	1-6
(Italy) Team Ciatti	Suter	53	(Italy) Nicola Morrentino	7
(Spain) La Moto2	La Moto 2	23	(Spain) Adrián Bonastre	2-5, 7
(Spain) MS Racing	Suter	24	(Spain) Ángel Poyatos	1-2
(Spain) MS Racing	Suter	59	(Spain) Pedro Rodríguez	1
(Spain) H43 Team	AJR	24	(Spain) Ángel Poyatos	3
(Spain) H43 Team	AJR	39	(Norway) Thomas Sigvartsen	7
(Spain) H43 Team	AJR	43	(Spain) Bartolomé Sánchez	5
(Spain) H43 Team	AJR	45	(Germany) Jan Bühn	1-4
(Spain) H43 Team	AJR	46	(Austria) Lukas Trautmann	6-7
(Spain) H43 Team	AJR	65	(Spain) Óscar Climent	1
(Spain) H43 Team	AJR	91	(Germany) Marc Büchner	6.7
(France) Promoto Sport	Transfiormers	31	(France) Valentin Debise	7
(Italy) GRT Racing Team	Suter	32	(Italy) Mirko Giansanti	1-2
(Spain) Aspar GRT Racing Team	Suter	24	(Spain) Ángel Poyatos	4-7
(Spain) Aspar GRT Racing Team	Suter	80	(Belgium) Dakota Mamola	2-7
(Spain) RC Sport	Suter	33	(Argentina) Juan Manuel Solorza	4
(Spain) RC Sport	Suter	37	(Argentina) Fabricio Perren	7
(Spain) AGR Team	Speed Up	36	(United States) Jason Andrew Uribe	7
(Spain) AGR Team	Speed Up	44	(South Africa) Steven Odendaal	All
(Germany) Saxoprint-RTG	AJR	42	(Germany) Toni Finsterbusch	All
(Italy) Alstare Junior Team	Bimota	51	(Sweden) Christoffer Bergman	2-5
(Australia) Rock Oil Racing	FTR	52	(Australia) Corey Turner	2-7
(Spain) Bruno Performance	TSR Motorsport	61	(Spain) Francisco Javier Hidalgo	All
(Spain) Team Climent		65	(Spain) Óscar Climent	4
(Germany) Stylobike Team Bohle Gruppe	Kalex	66	(Germany) Florian Alt	All
(Spain) DV Racing - Grup Pons	Inmotec	77	(Spain) Miquel Pons	All
Team Argentina-Stylobike	FTR	84	(Argentina) Diego Pierluigi	2
(Spain) RBA Racing Team		88	(Spain) Ricky Cardús	1
(Spain) Targobank Motorsport	Tech 3	89	(France) Alan Techer	All
(Spain) Targobank Motorsport	Tech 3	97	(Spain) Xavi Vierge	All
(Czech Republic) Montáže Brož Racing Team	Suter	95	(Czech Republic) Miroslav Popov	2-7
(Switzerland) SRS Swiss Racing Sports	Suter	96	(Switzerland) Damien Raemy	7
Superstock 600
(France) MMX Racing	Yamaha	4	(France) Thibaut Gourin	1-2, 7
(Portugal) Team SBK Incortcar	Yamaha	7	(Portugal) Alex Santos da Costa	1
(France) Bertin Thibaut	Yamaha	8	(France) Bertin Thibaut	All
(Spain) Macisa	Kawasaki	12	(Spain) Jesús Alconchel	2, 5
(Spain) Team Stratos	Kawasaki	13	(United States) Melissa Paris	1-4, 6-7
(Spain) Plus 15 Protect - PL Racing	Kawasaki	16	(Spain) Julio David Palao	1-2
(United Kingdom) Quelch After Dark	Kawasaki	27	(United Kingdom) Freddie Sheene	1-4
(United Kingdom) Quelch After Dark	Kawasaki	38	(United Kingdom) John Simpson	2-4
(United Kingdom) Quelch After Dark	Kawasaki	56	(United Kingdom) Blayes Heaven	1
(United Kingdom) Quelch After Dark	Kawasaki	63	(United Kingdom) James White	1-4
(United Kingdom) Quelch After Dark	Kawasaki	69	(United Kingdom) Josh Harland	1
(Spain) BTR Competición Barcelona	Yamaha	40	(Spain) Jonathan Rastrero	3
(Spain) Pastrana Racing Team	Yamaha	41	(Spain) Jorge Arroyo	1-2, 5, 7
(Spain) Pastrana Racing Team	Yamaha	85	(Spain) Abián Santana	1-2, 4, 6
(Spain) Team KRS	Kawasaki	48	(Spain) David Guzmán	1
(Italy) Bike E Motor Racing Team	Yamaha	58	(Italy) Daniele Zinni	7
(Italy) Bike E Motor Racing Team	Yamaha	72	(Italy) Roberto Bernardi	7
(Italy) Bike E Motor Racing Team	Yamaha	81	(Italy) Alex Bernardi	7
(Spain) JEG Racing	Yamaha	64	(Belgium) Amaury Jakab	7
(Spain) Team Climent	Yamaha	65	(Spain) Óscar Climent	7
(Spain) Team Torrentó	Yamaha	71	(Spain) Ferrán Casas	2-4
(Spain) Pequeño-Motos/IXS	Yamaha	75	(Portugal) Ivo Lopes	6
(France) TCP Racing	Yamaha	83	(France) Peter Polesso	7
(Norway) Team Flathaug Racing	Honda	86	(Norway) Henning Flathaug	7
(Switzerland) Stef Racing Team	Yamaha	90	(Switzerland) Stéphane Frossard	6-7
(Spain) Kawasaki Palmeto PL Racing	Kawasaki	93	(Argentina) Tomás Cassano	6
(Spain) Kawasaki Palmeto PL Racing	Kawasaki	94	(Uruguay) Maximiliano Gerardo	6
(Spain) Cardelús-BST	Kawasaki	98	(Spain) Álex Sirerol	4, 7
(France) Team CMS	Pirelli	99	(France) Alexandre Rodrigues	6

== Championship standings ==
Pos.	Rider	Bike	JER (Spain)	ARA (Spain)		CAT (Spain)	ALB (Spain)	NAV (Spain)		ALG (Portugal)		VAL (Spain)	Pts
Moto2
1	(Switzerland) **Jesko Raffin**	Kalex	DNF	**1**	**1**	1	**1**	4	1	4	6	1	186
2	(Germany) Florian Alt	Kalex	2	4	2	**2**	4	DNF	2	1	DNF	2	151
3	(Spain) Edgar Pons	Kalex	1	5	DNF	7	6	2	6	3	1	3	142
4	(Spain) Xavi Vierge	Tech 3	DNF	DNF	3	DNF	3	**1**	**3**	**2**	**9**	**5**	111
5	(South Africa) Steven Odendaal	Speed Up	7	3	DNF	3	DNF	9	4	23	2	4	94
6	(France) Alan Techer	Tech 3	3	2	DNF	5	DNF	3	DNF	DNF	3	DNF	79
7	(Argentina) Sebastián Porto	Kalex	**4**	5	4	4	2						69
8	(Spain) Ángel Poyatos	Suter	8	8	DNF		DNF	6	5	9	11	11	54
8	(Spain) Ángel Poyatos	AJR				17							54
9	(Czech Republic) Miroslav Popov	Suter		7	DNF	6	DNF	5	17	5	10	DNF	47
10	(Italy) Luca Vitali	Ariane	DNF	DNF	DNF	8	7	DNF	8	DNF	4	10	44
11	(Spain) Russell Gómez	Ariane	5	DNF	6	DNF	DNF	7	DNF	7	14	DNF	41
12	(Spain) Miquel Pons	Inmotec	15	11	10	DNF	10	8	DNF	10	DNF	9	39
13	(Spain) Francisco Javier Hidalgo	TSR	14	16	7	14	12	10	9	DNF	12	12	38
14	(Belgium) Dakota Mamola	Suter		9	5	DNF	DNF	12	10	DNF	DNF	7	37
15	(Switzerland) Bastien Chesaux	Suter	DNF	10	14	DNF	14	13	12	8	7	14	36
16	(Italy) Federico Fuligni	Suter	10	13	8	9	5	DNF	16	DNF	DNF		35
17	(Spain) Alejandro Medina	Ariane		22	DNF	12	DNF	11	7	13	5	DNF	32
18	(Spain) Diego Pérez Zuasti	MVR		12	16	15	8	DNF	13	11	15	8	30
19	(Austria) Lukas Trautmann	AJR								6	8	13	21
20	(Germany) Jan Bühn	AJR	9	18	12	DNF	9						18
21	(Spain) Ferrán Casas	Yamaha		15	9	11	11						18
22	(Germany) Toni Finsterbusch	AJR	DNF	17	11	10	13	14	14	DNF	16	DNF	18
23	(France) Bertin Thibaut	Yamaha	DNF	27	13	16	17	15	19	12	13	NC	11
24	(France) Valentin Debise	Transfiormers										6	10
25	(Spain) Ricky Cardús		6										10
26	(Spain) Bartolomé Sánchez	AJR						20	11				5
27	(Indonesia) Dimas Ekky Pratama	FTR	11										5
28	(Sweden) Christoffer Bergman	Bimota		DNF	DNF	13	15	DNF	15				5
29	(Argentina) Andrés González	MVR	13	21	15	DNF	16	17	18	15	17	17	5
30	(Italy) Mirko Giansanti	Suter	12	DNF	DNF								4
31	(Australia) Corey Turner	FTR		28	19	19	20	19	22	14	18	DNF	2
32	(Argentina) Diego Pierluigi	FTR		14	DNF								2
33	(Italy) Nicola Morrentino	Suter										15	1
Superstock 600
1	(France) Bertin Thibaut	Yamaha	DNF	5	2	2	2	1	1	1	1	1	196
2	(Spain) Ferrán Casas	Yamaha		1	1	1	1						100
3	(Spain) Jorge Arroyo	Yamaha	1	8	4			2	2			4	99
4	(France) Thibaut Gourin	Yamaha	2	2	3							3	72
5	(United States) Melissa Paris	Kawasaki	DNF	7	8	4	4			DNF	4	DNF	56
6	(Switzerland) Stéphane Frossard	Yamaha								2	2	5	51
7	(United Kingdom) John Simpson	Kawasaki		3	5	3	DNF						43
8	(Spain) Abián Santana	Yamaha	DNF	6	7		DNF			4	5		43
9	(Spain) Álex Sirerol	Kawasaki					3					2	36
10	(France) Alexandre Rodrigues									3	3		32
11	(Spain) Jesús Alconchel	Kawasaki		4	DNF			3	DNF				29
12	(Spain) Julio David Palao	Kawasaki	3	DNF	5								26
13	(United Kingdom) James White	Kawasaki	4	DNF	DNF	DNF	DNF						13
14	(Argentina) Tomás Cassano	Kawasaki								5	DNF		11
15	(Spain) David Guzmán	Kawasaki	5										11
16	(Belgium) Amaury Jakab	Yamaha										6	10
17	(Portugal) Ivo Lopes	Yamaha								6	DNF		10
18	(United Kingdom) Blayes Heaven	Kawasaki	6										10
19	(Spain) Óscar Climent	Yamaha										7	9
20	(Norway) Henning Flathaug	Honda										8	8
21	(Italy) Roberto Bernardi	Yamaha										9	7
Pos.	Rider	Bike	JER (Spain)	ARA (Spain)		CAT (Spain)	ALB (Spain)	NAV (Spain)		ALG (Portugal)		VAL (Spain)	Pts

Colour	Result
Gold	Winner
Silver	Second place
Bronze	Third place
Green	Points classification
Blue	Non-points classification
Blue	Non-classified finish (NC)
Purple	Retired, not classified (Ret)
Red	Did not qualify (DNQ)
Red	Did not pre-qualify (DNPQ)
Black	Disqualified (DSQ)
White	Did not start (DNS)
White	Withdrew (WD)
White	Race cancelled (C)
Blank	Did not practice (DNP)
Blank	Did not arrive (DNA)
Blank	Excluded (EX)

**Bold** – Pole position
Italics – Fastest lap
