= RW Racing GP =

Dutch motorcycle racing team

- 2026 name: Momoven Idrofoglia RW Racing Team
- Base: Dwingeloo, Netherlands
- Principal: Javi Martínez
- Rider(s): Moto2: 71. Ayumu Sasaki; 84. Zonta van den Goorbergh
- Motorcycle: Kalex Moto2
- Tyres: Pirelli
- Riders' Championships: –

RW Racing GP is a motorcycle racing team founded by businessman Roelof Waninge from The Netherlands. The team competes in the Moto2 World Championship and since 2026 in the FIM Moto2 European Championship under the Momoven Racing name.

== History ==
Roelof Waninge, was owner of a Dutch network of commercial vehicle dealerships and workshops headquartered in Assen, originally invested in motorcycle racing in 1993 as a personal sponsor of Dutch rider Jarno Janssen, who would go on to become RW's team principal after his riding career. In 2011, the long-standing Dutch 125 cc and 250 cc team owned by Arie Molenaar experienced financial trouble, prompting Waninge to purchase the remaining assets of the team and rename it RW Racing GP.

=== 125 cc/Moto3 ===
The team began competing in 2011, taking over the existing 125 cc programme from Molenaar, using Aprilia machinery and retaining upcoming Spanish rider Luis Salom. In 2012 with the replacement of the 125 cc class by the new four-stroke Moto3 regulations, the team switched to Kalex-KTM machines, retaining Salom and adding South African rider Brad Binder. Salom finished the season in 2nd place with 2 wins and 8 podiums. In 2013, former Molenaar team rider Jarno Janssen, who had continued with the team and subsequently with RW in various technical roles after retirement as a racer, was named general team manager. 2014 would prove to be the team's worst season to date, with both riders Scott Deroue and Ana Carrasco failing to score a single point. 2015 saw a major change for the team, with a switch to Honda machinery and a reduction to a single rider, Livio Loi. Loi managed a win in 2015 at Indianapolis that season, but managed only one other top 10 finish with a 5th place at Silverstone Circuit. For the 2016 season, RW continued with Loi with similar overall results.

=== Moto2 ===
2017 saw another major step for the RW Racing GP team, as they moved up to Moto2 with Spanish rider Axel Pons on Kalex machinery.

For the 2018 season, RW joined forces with Japanese chassis manufacturer NTS to operate their factory programme as the sole users of the NTS chassis, expanding their programme to two riders. Despite NTS's relatively quick success in the previous two seasons of the CEV Moto2 European Championship, the challenge of the Moto2 World Championship proved difficult with RW finishing 16th and 15th from 18 teams in 2018 and 2019. Fortunes did not improve in 2020, finishing 14th of 15 teams on 22 points. For 2021, the team signed former Tech3 MotoGP rider Hafizh Syahrin and young Belgian rider Barry Baltus. The team scored just 11 points and finished last of all teams.

For 2022, the team ended their difficult partnership with NTS after four seasons, and returned to the series-dominant Kalex machines. They kept Barry Baltus onboard, with the Belgian now being paired up with the 16 year old Dutchman Zonta van den Goorbergh.

Since 2023, Fieten Olie is the main sponsor of this team.

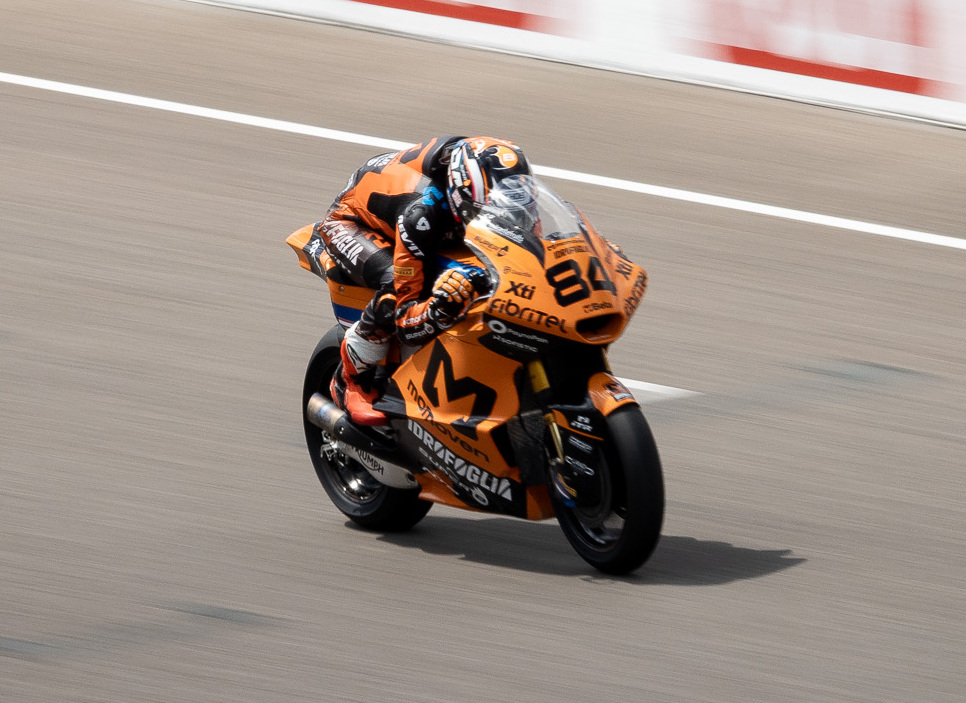
Zonta van den Goorbergh at the 2026 German motorcycle Grand Prix

In 2025 the team started a collaboration with Momoven to found the Momoven Idrofoglia RW Racing Team, a junior team made to compete in the FIM Moto2 European Championship and the FIM Moto3 Junior World Championship.

== Results ==
=== MotoJunior World Championship ===
| Year | Class | Team name | Motorcycle | No. | Riders | Races | Wins | Podiums | Poles | F. laps | Points | Pos. |
|---|---|---|---|---|---|---|---|---|---|---|---|---|
| 2026 | Moto3 | Momoven Racing | KTM RC250GP | 24 | (France) Guillem Planques | 12 | 0 | 0 | 0 | 1 | 60 | 11th |
| 2026 | Moto3 | Momoven Racing | KTM RC250GP | 34 | (France) Fabio Pilato | 12 | 0 | 0 | 0 | 0 | 0 | 39th |
| 2026 | Moto3 | Momoven Racing | KTM RC250GP | 57 | (Italy) Leonardo Zanni | 12 | 1 | 1 | 1 | 1 | 91 | 9th |
| 2026 | Moto2 | Momoven Racing | Kalex Moto2 | 10 | (Spain) Unai Orradre | 11 | 0 | 9 | 1 | 4 | 178 | 2nd |

=== Grand Prix motorcycle racing ===
| Year | Class | Team name | Motorcycle | No. | Riders | Races | Wins | Podiums | Poles | F. laps | Points | Pos. |
|---|---|---|---|---|---|---|---|---|---|---|---|---|
| 2011 | 125cc | RW Racing GP | Aprilia RSA 125 | 39 | (Spain) Luis Salom | 15 | 0 | 2 | 0 | 0 | 116 | 8th |
| 2011 | 125cc | RW Racing GP | Aprilia RSA 125 | 14 | (South Africa) Brad Binder | 1 (5) (Note: Non-bracketed number refers to the number accumulated with team, with number in brackets referring to the total accumulated for the season.) | 0 | 0 | 0 | 0 | 0 | NC |
| 2012 | Moto3 | RW Racing GP | Kalex-KTM | 39 | (Spain) Luis Salom | 17 | 2 | 8 | 0 | 1 | 214 | 2nd |
| 2012 | Moto3 | RW Racing GP | Kalex-KTM | 41 | (South Africa) Brad Binder | 17 | 0 | 0 | 0 | 0 | 24 | 21st |
| 2013 | Moto3 | RW Racing GP; Redox RW Racing GP | Kalex-KTM | 53 | (Netherlands) Jasper Iwema | 17 | 0 | 0 | 0 | 0 | 8 | 24th |
| 2013 | Moto3 | RW Racing GP; Redox RW Racing GP | Kalex-KTM | 84 | (Czech Republic) Jakub Kornfeil | 17 | 0 | 0 | 0 | 0 | 68 | 11th |
| 2014 | Moto3 | RW Racing GP | Kalex-KTM | 9 | (Netherlands) Scott Deroue | 18 | 0 | 0 | 0 | 0 | 0 | NC |
| 2014 | Moto3 | RW Racing GP | Kalex-KTM | 22 | (Spain) Ana Carrasco | 14 | 0 | 0 | 0 | 0 | 0 | NC |
| 2015 | Moto3 | RW Racing GP | Honda NSF250RW | 11 | (Belgium) Livio Loi | 18 | 1 | 1 | 0 | 0 | 56 | 16th |
| 2016 | Moto3 | RW Racing GP | Honda NSF250RW | 11 | (Belgium) Livio Loi | 18 | 0 | 0 | 0 | 1 | 63 | 18th |
| 2017 | Moto2 | RW Racing GP | Kalex Moto2 | 49 | (Spain) Axel Pons | 18 | 0 | 0 | 0 | 0 | 27 | 19th |
| 2018 | Moto2 | NTS RW Racing GP | NTS NH6 | 4 | (South Africa) Steven Odendaal | 18 | 0 | 0 | 0 | 0 | 4 | 28th |
| 2018 | Moto2 | NTS RW Racing GP | NTS NH6 | 16 | (United States) Joe Roberts | 18 | 0 | 0 | 0 | 0 | 5 | 27th |
| 2019 | Moto2 | NTS RW Racing GP | NTS NH7 | 4 | (South Africa) Steven Odendaal | 9 | 0 | 0 | 0 | 0 | 0 | 31st |
| 2019 | Moto2 | NTS RW Racing GP | NTS NH7 | 64 | (Netherlands) Bo Bendsneyder | 19 | 0 | 0 | 0 | 0 | 7 | 26th |
| 2019 | Moto2 | NTS RW Racing GP | NTS NH7 | 2 | (Switzerland) Jesko Raffin | 7 (8) | 0 | 0 | 0 | 0 | 6 | 27th |
| 2019 | Moto2 | NTS RW Racing GP | NTS NH7 | 24 | (Italy) Simone Corsi | 2 (11) | 0 | 0 | 0 | 0 | 0 (10) | 24th |
| 2019 | Moto2 | NTS RW Racing GP | NTS NH7 | 70 | (Italy) Tommaso Marcon | 1 | 0 | 0 | 0 | 0 | 0 | 40th |
| 2020 | Moto2 | NTS RW Racing GP | NTS NH7 | 2 | (Switzerland) Jesko Raffin | 3 | 0 | 0 | 0 | 0 | 0 | 33rd |
| 2020 | Moto2 | NTS RW Racing GP | NTS NH7 | 64 | (Netherlands) Bo Bendsneyder | 15 | 0 | 0 | 0 | 0 | 18 | 23rd |
| 2020 | Moto2 | NTS RW Racing GP | NTS NH7 | 77 | (Switzerland) Dominique Aegerter | 4 (5) | 0 | 0 | 0 | 0 | 4 | 28th |
| 2020 | Moto2 | NTS RW Racing GP | NTS NH7 | 74 | (Poland) Piotr Biesiekirski | 7 | 0 | 0 | 0 | 0 | 0 | 32nd |
| 2021 | Moto2 | NTS RW Racing GP | NTS NH7 | 55 | (Malaysia) Hafizh Syahrin | 17 | 0 | 0 | 0 | 0 | 9 | 28th |
| 2021 | Moto2 | NTS RW Racing GP | NTS NH7 | 70 | (Belgium) Barry Baltus | 14 | 0 | 0 | 0 | 0 | 2 | 32nd |
| 2021 | Moto2 | NTS RW Racing GP | NTS NH7 | 89 | (United Kingdom) Fraser Rogers | 1 | 0 | 0 | 0 | 0 | 0 | 38th |
| 2021 | Moto2 | NTS RW Racing GP | NTS NH7 | 32 | (Japan) Taiga Hada | 1 (2) | 0 | 0 | 0 | 0 | 0 | 39th |
| 2021 | Moto2 | NTS RW Racing GP | NTS NH7 | 10 | (Italy) Tommaso Marcon | 1 (5) | 0 | 0 | 0 | 0 | 0 | 35th |
| 2022 | Moto2 | RW Racing GP | Kalex Moto2 | 7 | (Belgium) Barry Baltus | 16 | 0 | 0 | 0 | 0 | 30 | 21st |
| 2022 | Moto2 | RW Racing GP | Kalex Moto2 | 84 | (Netherlands) Zonta van den Goorbergh | 18 | 0 | 0 | 0 | 0 | 0 | 34th |
| 2022 | Moto2 | RW Racing GP | Kalex Moto2 | 11 | (Italy) Mattia Pasini | 1 (3) | 0 | 0 | 0 | 0 | 0 (1) | 33rd |
| 2023 | Moto2 | Fieten Olie Racing GP | Kalex Moto2 | 7 | (Belgium) Barry Baltus | 19 | 0 | 0 | 0 | 0 | 55 | 17th |
| 2023 | Moto2 | Fieten Olie Racing GP | Kalex Moto2 | 84 | (Netherlands) Zonta van den Goorbergh | 20 | 0 | 0 | 0 | 0 | 17 | 23rd |
| 2023 | Moto2 | Fieten Olie Racing GP | Kalex Moto2 | 34 | (Italy) Mattia Pasini | 2 | 0 | 0 | 0 | 0 | 11 | 25th |
| 2023 | Moto2 | Fieten Olie Racing GP | NTS NH7 | 45 | (Spain) Héctor Garzó | 1 | 0 | 0 | 0 | 0 | 0 | NC |
| 2024 | Moto2 | RW-Idrofoglia Racing GP | Kalex Moto2 | 7 | (Belgium) Barry Baltus | 20 | 0 | 1 | 0 | 0 | 40 | 21st |
| 2024 | Moto2 | RW-Idrofoglia Racing GP | Kalex Moto2 | 84 | (Netherlands) Zonta van den Goorbergh | 20 | 0 | 0 | 0 | 0 | 31 | 22nd |
| 2025 | Moto2 | RW-Idrofoglia Racing GP | Kalex Moto2 | 71 | (Japan) Ayumu Sasaki | 21 | 0 | 0 | 0 | 0 | 24 | 23rd |
| 2025 | Moto2 | RW-Idrofoglia Racing GP | Kalex Moto2 | 84 | (Netherlands) Zonta van den Goorbergh | 22 | 0 | 0 | 0 | 0 | 19 | 25th |
| 2025 | Moto2 | RW NTS Idrofoglia | NTS NH7 | 22 | (Spain) Héctor Garzó | 1 | 0 | 0 | 0 | 0 | 0 | NC |
| 2026 | Moto2 | RW-Idrofoglia Racing GP | Kalex Moto2 | 71 | (Japan) Ayumu Sasaki | 17 | 0 | 0 | 0 | 0 | 26* | 20th* |
| 2026 | Moto2 | RW-Idrofoglia Racing GP | Kalex Moto2 | 84 | (Netherlands) Zonta van den Goorbergh | 19 | 0 | 0 | 0 | 0 | 14* | 25th* |

Key
Regular rider
Replacement rider
Wildcard rider
Replacement/wildcard rider

Notes

* Season still in progress.
