= FIM Moto2 European Championship =

Motorcycle racing competition

- Category: Motorcycle sport
- Country: Europe
- Inaugural event: 2010
- Constructors: Boscoscuro, Kalex, Forward
- Tyre suppliers: Pirelli
- Official Website: FIM Moto2 European Championship

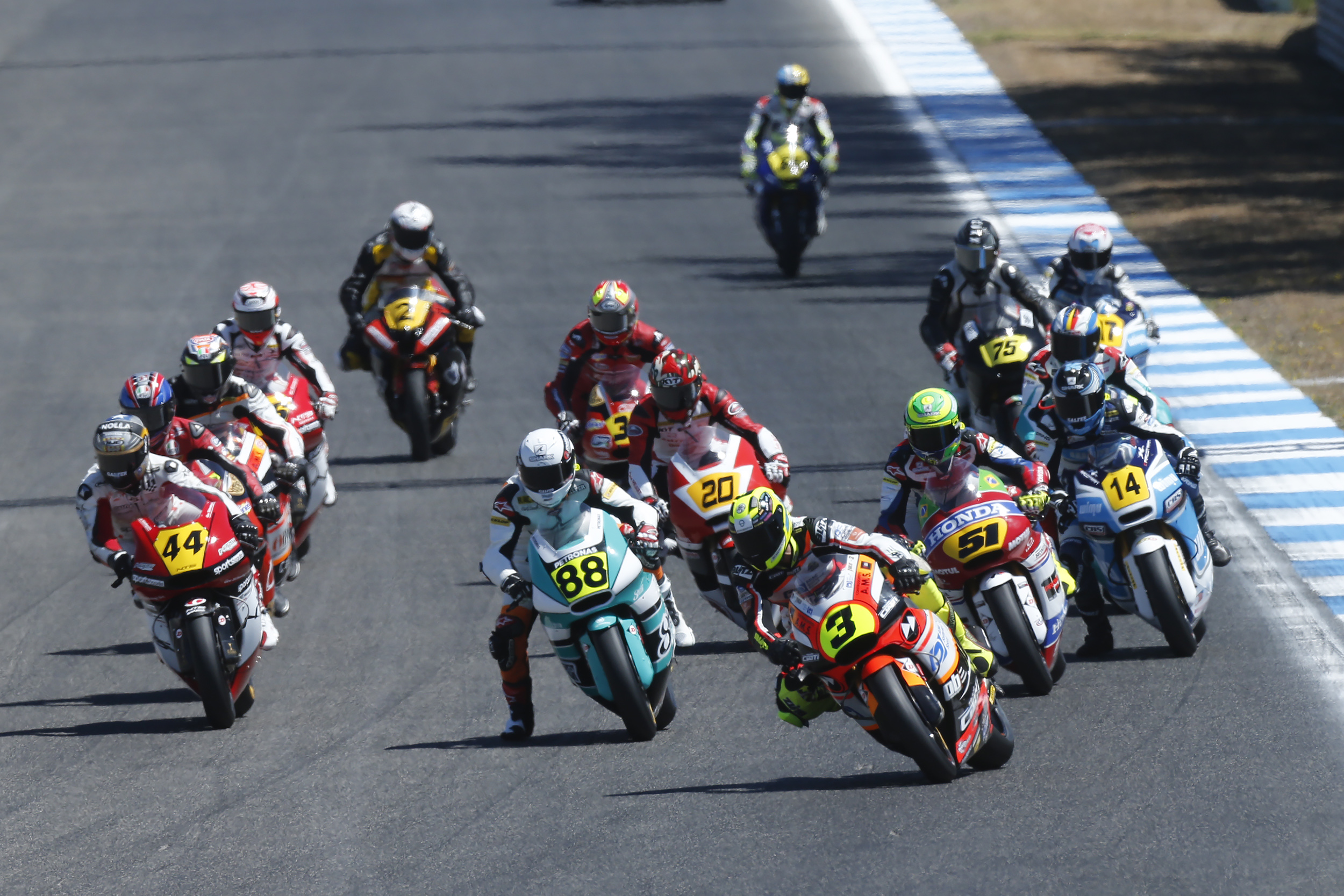
A race start at Estoril in 2017

FIM Moto2 European Championship is a motorcycle racing competition intended for young racers in Europe. This competition is organized by Dorna, which also runs the competition MotoGP, and Superbike World Championship.

Moto2 was initially a 600 cc four-stroke class. Engines were supplied exclusively by Honda, tires by Dunlop and electronics are limited and supplied only by FIM-sanctioned producers. Carbon brake discs are banned, only steel brake discs are allowed. However, there are no chassis limitations.

The championship was scheduled to switch to Triumph engines in 2020, following the switch of the Moto2 World Championship in 2019. However the switch was postponed for 2020 and 2021 to reduce costs due to the ongoing COVID-19 pandemic. The championship switched to Triumph engines in 2022.

== Sponsor ==
- Finetwork
- HRC
- Dell'Orto
- Dunlop
- Prosecco Doc
- Hawkers
- Bridgestone

== Champions ==
Year	Rider	Team	Constructor
2010	(Spain) Carmelo Morales	(Spain) Team Laglisse	Suter
2011	(Spain) Jordi Torres	(Spain) Team Laglisse	Suter
2012	(Spain) Jordi Torres	(Spain) Team Laglisse	Suter
2013	(Spain) Román Ramos	(Spain) Team Stratos	Ariane
2014	(Switzerland) Jesko Raffin	(Spain) Pons Racing	Kalex
2015	(Spain) Edgar Pons	(Spain) Páginas Amarillas HP40 Junior	Kalex
2016	(South Africa) Steven Odendaal	(Spain) AGR Team	Kalex
2017	(Brazil) Eric Granado	(Spain) Promoracing	Kalex
2018	(Switzerland) Jesko Raffin	(Spain) easyRace Team	Suter
2019	(Spain) Edgar Pons	(Spain) Baiko Racing Team	Kalex
2020	(Italy) Yari Montella	(Italy) Team Ciatti	Speed Up
2021	(Spain) Fermín Aldeguer	(Italy) Team Ciatti	Boscoscuro
2022	(Germany) Lukas Tulovic	(Germany) Liqui Moly Intact JuniorGP Team	Kalex
2023	(Australia) Senna Agius	(Germany) Liqui Moly Intact JuniorGP Team	Kalex
2024	(Spain) Roberto García	(Italy) Team Ciatti	Kalex
2025	(Poland) Milan Pawelec	(Spain) AGR Team	Kalex
2026	(Poland) Milan Pawelec	(Spain) AGR Team	Kalex
