= 2016 FIM CEV Moto2 European Championship =

2016 FIM CEV Moto2 European Championship
Previous:	2015	Next:	2017
Support series: FIM CEV Moto3 Junior World Championship; FIM CEV Superbike European Championship

The 2016 FIM CEV Moto2 European Championship was the seventh CEV Moto2 season and the second under the FIM banner. The season was held over 11 races at 7 meetings, beginning on 17 April at Valencia and finishing on 20 November at the same venue.

== Calendar ==
Round	Date	Circuit	Pole position	Fastest lap	Race winner	Winning constructor	Sources
1	17 April	(Spain) Valencia	(Brazil) Eric Granado	(Brazil) Eric Granado	(Brazil) Eric Granado	(Germany) Kalex	
1	17 April	(Spain) Valencia	(Brazil) Eric Granado	(South Africa) Steven Odendaal	(South Africa) Steven Odendaal	(Germany) Kalex	
2	29 May	(Spain) Aragón	(South Africa) Steven Odendaal	(France) Alan Techer	(South Africa) Steven Odendaal	(Germany) Kalex	
2	29 May	(Spain) Aragón	(South Africa) Steven Odendaal	(Japan) Tetsuta Nagashima	(South Africa) Steven Odendaal	(Germany) Kalex	
3	12 June	(Spain) Catalunya	(Japan) Tetsuta Nagashima	(Australia) Remy Gardner	(Spain) Ricard Cardús	(France) TransFIORmers	
3	12 June	(Spain) Catalunya	(Japan) Tetsuta Nagashima	(Spain) Ricard Cardús	(Australia) Remy Gardner	(Germany) Kalex	
4	3 July	(Spain) Albacete	(South Africa) Steven Odendaal	(Japan) Tetsuta Nagashima	(South Africa) Steven Odendaal	(Germany) Kalex	
5	28 August	(Portugal) Algarve	(Japan) Tetsuta Nagashima	(South Africa) Steven Odendaal	(South Africa) Steven Odendaal	(Germany) Kalex	
5	28 August	(Portugal) Algarve	(Japan) Tetsuta Nagashima	(Japan) Tetsuta Nagashima	(South Africa) Steven Odendaal	(Germany) Kalex	
6	2 October	(Spain) Jerez	(South Africa) Steven Odendaal	(Japan) Tetsuta Nagashima	(France) Alan Techer	(Japan) NTS	
7	20 November	(Spain) Valencia	(South Africa) Steven Odendaal	(France) Alan Techer	(Japan) Tetsuta Nagashima	(Germany) Kalex	

== Entry list ==
Team	Bike	No.	Rider	Rounds
Moto2
(Italy) Cruciani Racing	Suter	2	(Spain) Ana Carrasco	6-7
(Italy) Cruciani Racing	Suter	24	(Spain) Ángel Poyatos	5-7
(Italy) Cruciani Racing	Suter	81	(Italy) Alex Bernardi	1-4
(Spain) Griful	MVR	2	(Spain) Ana Carrasco	1-4
(Spain) Griful	MVR	69	(France) Louis Rossi	6
(Austria) Fritze Tuning	FTR	3	(Germany) Lukas Tulovic	1–3
(Austria) Fritze Tuning	FTR	13	(Australia) Anthony West	3–4
(Spain) ST One Racing Team	FTR	3	(Germany) Lukas Tulovic	4–5
(Italy) Team Ciatti	Kalex	3	(Germany) Lukas Tulovic	6-7
(Italy) Team Ciatti	Kalex	12	(Indonesia) Ali Adrian Rusmiputro	4, 7
(Italy) Team Ciatti	Kalex	22	(Italy) Federico Fuligni	1-2 5-7
(France) Ecurie Berga	FTR	4	(France) Guillaume Raymond	2-7
(France) Ecurie Berga	Suter	8	(France) Thibaut Bertin	1-4
(Spain) Team Stratos	Ariane	6	(United States) Michael Aquino	1-3
(Spain) Team Stratos	Ariane	33	(Spain) Jeremy Bernet	6-7
(France) RACE EXPERIENCE	Kalex	7	(Spain) Iker Lecuona	2-7
(France) RACE EXPERIENCE	Kalex	87	(Australia) Remy Gardner	1-3
(Spain) Team Nobby H43 Talasur (Spain) Team Nobby H43 Honda	H43 / Kalex	15	(Norway) Thomas Sigvartsen	All
(Spain) Team Nobby H43 Talasur (Spain) Team Nobby H43 Honda	H43 / Kalex	43	(Germany) Manou Antweiler	7
(Spain) Team Nobby H43 Talasur (Spain) Team Nobby H43 Honda	H43 / Kalex	46	(Switzerland) Marcel Brenner	All
(Spain) Team Nobby H43 Talasur (Spain) Team Nobby H43 Honda	Kalex	17	(Japan) Sena Yamada	1-6
(Spain) Targobank CNS Motorsport	Tech 3	16	(Italy) Gabriele Ruju	All
(Spain) Targobank CNS Motorsport	Tech 3	34	(Spain) Xavier Pinsach	1-2
(Spain) Targobank CNS Motorsport	Tech 3	37	(Spain) Augusto Fernández	2-7
(Spain) Promoracing	Kalex	18	(Andorra) Xavier Cardelús	All
(Spain) Promoracing	Kalex	51	(Brazil) Eric Granado	All
(Indonesia) Astra Honda Racing Team	Kalex	20	(Indonesia) Dimas Ekky Pratama	All
(Spain) Stratos-DVRacing	Kalex	32	(Germany) Max Enderlein	All
(Spain) AGR Team	Kalex	36	(United States) Jayson Uribe	All
(Spain) AGR Team	Kalex	44	(South Africa) Steven Odendaal	All
(Italy) Bierreti	Kalex	39	(Italy) Federico Menozzi	7
(Finland) Ajo Motorsport Academy	Kalex	45	(Japan) Tetsuta Nagashima	All
(United Kingdom) PCR Performance / CNC Routing	Speed Up	47	(United Kingdom) Paul Curran	1
(Austria) COFAIN Racing Team	Kalex	56	(Austria) Thomas Gradinger	1-2
(France) Promoto Sport	Transfiormers	69	(France) Louis Rossi	1
(France) Promoto Sport	Transfiormers	77	(Spain) Ricard Cardús	3, 7
(Spain) TEAM STYLOBIKE	Kalex	76	(Italy) Samuele Cavalieri	All
(Japan) NTS T Pro	NTS TPro	41	(Japan) Taiga Hada	7
(Japan) NTS T Pro	NTS TPro	89	(France) Alan Techer	All
(Malaysia) AHM Petronas Motorsport	Kalex	93	(Malaysia) Ramdan Rosli	All
(Sweden) Team Ogeborn Motorsport	Kalex	94	(Sweden) Pontus Duerlund	All
(Spain) BULLIT Motorcycles	MIR Racing	96	(Spain) David Sanchis	All
STK600
(Spain) Chronos Corse	Honda	50	(Indonesia) Rafid Topan Sucipto	3–4
(Spain) H43 Nobby Talasur	Kawasaki	77	(Spain) Miquel Pons	7
(Portugal) Oneundret Racing Team	Kawasaki	75	(Portugal) Ivo Lopes	All
(Spain) Pinamoto RS	Kawasaki	67	(Switzerland) Roman Fischer	5
(Spain) Teamtack	Kawasaki	50	(Indonesia) Rafid Topan Sucipto	5
(Spain) Totpla Trading VSEXtreme Team	Kawasaki	24	(Spain) Alexis González	1, 3
(Italy) Champi–Middem	Yamaha	73	(Italy) Jacopo Cretaro	1–2, 6
(Russia) DMC Racing	Yamaha	37	(Russia) Anton Eremin	1
(Russia) DMC Racing	Yamaha	61	(Russia) Alexey Ivanov	1
(Spain) Fau55Racing	Yamaha	57	(Spain) Adrián Menchén	7
(France) JEG Racing	Yamaha	19	(France) Paul Dufour	3, 7
(France) Race Experience	Yamaha	10	(France) Thibaut Gourin	All
(Spain) SAG–MA Motorsports	Yamaha	9	(Spain) Borja Quero	7
(Switzerland) TCP Racing	Yamaha	80	(Switzerland) Sébastien Fraga	7
(Spain) Team Stratos	Yamaha	27	(Spain) Diego Carbó	2, 4

== Championship standings ==
Pos.	Rider	Bike	VAL (Spain)		ARA (Spain)		CAT (Spain)		ALB (Spain)	ALG (Portugal)		JER (Spain)	VAL (Spain)	Pts
Moto2
1	(South Africa) Steven Odendaal	Kalex	2	1	**1**	**1**	Ret	3	**1**	1	1	**2**	**Ret**	206
2	(Japan) Tetsuta Nagashima	Kalex	Ret	DNS	2	3	**3**	**4**	2	**2**	**3**	3	1	162
3	(France) Alan Techer	NTS	3	2	3	2	Ret	DNS	3	3	2	1	4	162
4	(Brazil) Eric Granado	Kalex	**1**	**Ret**	Ret	6	2	5	4	6	6	6	2	129
5	(Spain) Augusto Fernández	Tech 3			4	4	4	7	Ret	4	4	4	5	98
6	(Spain) Iker Lecuona	Kalex			7	7	5	6	5	7	5	7	16	79
7	(Indonesia) Dimas Ekky Pratama	Kalex	Ret	15	6	9	Ret	8	6	5	8	5	Ret	66
8	(Andorra) Xavier Cardelús	Kalex	9	4	10	DNS	Ret	9	10	11	10	12	7	63
9	(Spain) Ricard Cardús	Transfiormers					1	2					3	61
10	(Italy) Samuele Cavalieri	Kalex	5	14	5	12	10	13	Ret	8	7	Ret	11	59
11	(United States) Jayson Uribe	Kalex	14	7	9	11	7	11	Ret	Ret	DNS	11	8	50
12	(France) Thibaut Bertin	Suter	8	5	8	10	Ret	12	7					46
13	(Italy) Gabriele Ruju	Tech 3	12	9	Ret	13	6	10	11	13	14	10	Ret	46
14	(Malaysia) Ramdan Rosli	Kalex	Ret	11	13	17	DNS	DNS	9	9	9	9	10	42
15	(Italy) Federico Fuligni	Kalex	4	3						14	Ret	Ret	6	41
16	(Australia) Remy Gardner	Kalex	Ret	13	Ret	5	Ret	1						39
17	(Norway) Thomas Sigvartsen	H43	7	6										32
17	(Norway) Thomas Sigvartsen	Kalex			Ret	15	11	15	17	15	12	17	15	32
18	(Japan) Sena Yamada	Kalex	15	Ret	11	8	8	14	8	20	Ret	Ret		32
19	(Germany) Max Enderlein	Kalex	10	10	23	16	9	17	13	12	17	Ret	20	26
20	(Switzerland) Marcel Brenner	H43	16	17	15	18	Ret	16	14					22
20	(Switzerland) Marcel Brenner	Kalex								10	11	8	17	22
21	(Spain) David Sanchis	MIR Racing	13	8	18	Ret	13	18	12	17	Ret	Ret	14	20
22	(France) Louis Rossi	Transfiormers	6	16										12
22	(France) Louis Rossi	MVR										14		12
23	(Germany) Lukas Tulovic	FTR	17	Ret	19	21	17	Ret	24	22	19			10
23	(Germany) Lukas Tulovic	Kalex										13	9	10
24	(Sweden) Pontus Duerlund	Kalex	11	20	17	DNS	12	Ret	16	Ret	18	20	Ret	9
25	(Spain) Ángel Poyatos	Suter								16	13	15	13	7
26	(Austria) Thomas Gradinger	FTR	Ret	DNS	12	14								6
27	(Japan) Taiga Hada	NTS											12	4
28	(Italy) Jacopo Cretaro	Yamaha	18	12	16	DNS						19		4
29	(Portugal) Ivo Lopes	Kawasaki	21	18	14	19	Ret	22	25	18	15	16	DNS	3
30	(Indonesia) Rafid Topan Sucipto	Honda					14	20	18					2
30	(Indonesia) Rafid Topan Sucipto	Kawasaki								21	Ret			2
31	(Australia) Anthony West	FTR					Ret	19	15					1
32	(France) Thibaut Gourin	Yamaha	Ret	19	22	DNS	15	21	21	23	16	18	24	1
	(France) Paul Dufour	Yamaha					16	24						0
	(Spain) Borja Quero	Yamaha											18	0
	(Spain) Ana Carrasco	MVR	DSQ	23	20	20	18	23	23					0
	(Spain) Ana Carrasco	Suter										21	23	0
	(Italy) Alex Bernardi	Suter	23	Ret	DNS	23	19	25	19					0
	(Spain) Adrián Menchén	Yamaha											19	0
	(France) Guillaume Raymond	FTR			21	22	21	Ret	20	19	Ret	23	Ret	0
	(Russia) Alexey Ivanov	Yamaha	19	22										0
	(United States) Michael Aquino	Ariane	22	21	Ret	DNS	20	26						0
	(Spain) Alexis González	Kawasaki	20	DNS			22	Ret						0
	(Switzerland) Roman Fischer	Kawasaki								Ret	20			0
	(Spain) Miquel Pons	Kawasaki											21	0
	(Indonesia) Ali Adriansyah Rusmiputro	Kalex							22				22	0
	(Spain) Jeremy Bernet	Ariane										22	Ret	0
	(Russia) Anton Eremin	Yamaha	Ret	24										0
	(Switzerland) Sébastien Fraga	Yamaha											25	0
	(Spain) Diego Carbó	Yamaha			Ret	Ret			Ret					0
	(Spain) Xavier Pinsach	Tech 3	Ret	Ret	DNS	DNS								0
	(Germany) Manou Antweiler	H43											Ret	0
	(United Kingdom) Paul Curran	Speed Up	Ret	DNS										0
	(Italy) Federico Menozzi	Kalex											DNQ	0
Superstock 600
1	(Portugal) Ivo Lopes	Kawasaki	21	18	14	19	Ret	22	25	18	15	16	DNS	190
2	(France) Thibaut Gourin	Yamaha	Ret	19	22	DNS	15	21	21	23	16	18	24	161
3	(Indonesia) Rafid Topan Sucipto	Honda					14	20	18					95
3	(Indonesia) Rafid Topan Sucipto	Kawasaki								21	Ret			95
4	(Italy) Jacopo Cretaro	Yamaha	18	12	16	DNS						19		86
5	(Russia) Alexey Ivanov	Yamaha	19	22										33
6	(France) Paul Dufour	Yamaha					16	24					Ret	29
7	(Spain) Alexis González	Kawasaki	20	DNS			22	Ret						29
8	(Spain) Borja Quero	Yamaha											18	25
9	(Spain) Adrián Menchén	Yamaha											19	20
10	(Spain) Miquel Pons	Kawasaki											21	16
11	(Switzerland) Roman Fischer	Kawasaki								Ret	20			16
12	(Switzerland) Sébastien Fraga	Yamaha											25	11
13	(Russia) Anton Eremin	Yamaha	Ret	24										11
	(Spain) Diego Carbó	Yamaha			Ret	Ret			Ret					0
Pos.	Rider	Bike	VAL (Spain)		ARA (Spain)		CAT (Spain)		ALB (Spain)	ALG (Portugal)		JER (Spain)	VAL (Spain)	Pts

Colour	Result
Gold	Winner
Silver	Second place
Bronze	Third place
Green	Points classification
Blue	Non-points classification
Blue	Non-classified finish (NC)
Purple	Retired, not classified (Ret)
Red	Did not qualify (DNQ)
Red	Did not pre-qualify (DNPQ)
Black	Disqualified (DSQ)
White	Did not start (DNS)
White	Withdrew (WD)
White	Race cancelled (C)
Blank	Did not practice (DNP)
Blank	Did not arrive (DNA)
Blank	Excluded (EX)

**Bold** – Pole position
Italics – Fastest lap
