= Rafid Topan Sucipto =

Indonesian motorcycle racer

- Nationality: Indonesian
- Born: August 24, 1994 (age 32); Jakarta, Indonesia
- Current team: Yamaha Yamalube KYT TJM WR Super battery
- Bike number: 250
Motorcycle racing career statistics
Moto2 World Championship
| Active years | 2012–2013, 2018 |
| Manufacturers | Speed Up-Honda, Suter |
| Championships | 0 |
| 2018 championship position | 46th (0 pts) |
Starts / Wins / Podiums / Poles / F. laps / Points; 19 / 0 / 0 / 0 / 0 / 0

Rafid Topan Sucipto (born August 24, 1994, in Jakarta, Indonesia), also known professionally as Rafid Topan, is an Indonesian motorcycle racer. He races a Yamaha YZF-R25 in the Asia Road Racing Championship class AP250. In 2015, he raced in the Asia Road Race SS600 Championship aboard a Suzuki GSX-R600. He previously competed in the Moto2 World Championship for QMMF Racing Team.

== Career ==
=== Early years ===
Topan began motorcycle racing a bit later than most professionals, starting at 13 years of age. He won his rookie year in Novice category of the Indonesian national championship in both 2007 and 2008, and clinching the Expert title in 2009. In 2011, Topan won the Underbone title of the PETRONAS Asia Road Racing Championship, whilst in 2012, he made his Supersport 600cc debut.

=== Moto2 World Championship ===
At the end of 2012, Topan substituted for Anthony West in the QMMF Racing team in Moto2 and impressed the team sufficiently to be offered a ride alongside West for 2013. Topan was ranked 30th in 2013 Moto2 season, with his best finishing position of 20th at Phillip Island and qualified fifth at Twin Ring Motegi.

Topan was selected by Forward Racing to replace their injured rider, Stefano Manzi, in the 2018 Malaysian motorcycle Grand Prix. This marked his first Moto2 appearance after being absent from the championship for five years. He managed to finish the race in 26th position.

=== CEV Moto2 European Championship ===
Topan participated in the 2016 FIM CEV Moto2 European Championship and also in the CEV Superstock 600 European Championship. On his debut race in Circuit de Barcelona-Catalunya on 12 June 2016, he finished 14th overall in the first race and 20th overall in the second race. Despite his overall finishes, he was classified as winner on both races for the Superstock 600 class.

== Career statistics ==
=== Indoprix ===
==== Races by year ====
(key) (Races in bold indicate pole position; races in italics indicate fastest lap)

| Year | Bike | 1 | | 2 | | 3 | | 4 | | 5 | | Pos | Pts |
| Year | Bike | R1 | R2 | R1 | R2 | R1 | R2 | R1 | R2 | R1 | R2 | Pos | Pts |
|---|---|---|---|---|---|---|---|---|---|---|---|---|---|
| 2014 | Suzuki | SIK; Ret | SIK; Ret | SKY; 13 | SKY; 2 | SIK; DNQ | SIK; DNQ | SKY; DNS | SKY; DNS | BAL | BAL | 23rd | 15 |

=== FIM CEV Moto2 European Championship ===
| Season | Class | Bike | Team | Race | Win | Pod | Pole | FLap | Pts | Plcd | WCh |
|---|---|---|---|---|---|---|---|---|---|---|---|
| 2016 | Moto2 | Honda CBR600RR | Chronos Corse | 3 | 0 | 0 | 0 | 0 | 2 | 30th | 0 |
| 2016 | Moto2 | Kawasaki | Chronos Corse | 2 | 0 | 0 | 0 | 0 | 2 | 30th | 0 |
| Total | | | | **5** | **0** | **0** | **0** | **0** | **2** | | **0** |

==== Races by year ====
(key)

| Year | Class | Bike | 1 | 2 | 3 | 4 | 5 | 6 | 7 | 8 | 9 | 10 | 11 | Pos | Pts |
|---|---|---|---|---|---|---|---|---|---|---|---|---|---|---|---|
| 2016 | Moto2 | Honda | VAL | VAL | ARA | ARA | CAT; 14 | CAT; 20 | ALB; 18 | | | | | 30th | 2 |
| 2016 | Moto2 | Kawasaki | | | | | | | | ALG; 21 | ALG; Ret | JER | VAL | 30th | 2 |

=== FIM CEV Superstock 600 European Championship ===
| Season | Class | Bike | Team | Race | Win | Pod | Pole | FLap | Pts | Plcd | WCh |
|---|---|---|---|---|---|---|---|---|---|---|---|
| 2016 | Superstock 600 | Honda CBR600RR | Chronos Corse | 2 | 2 | 2 | 0 | 0 | 50* | 4th* | 0 |
| Total | | | | **2** | **2** | **2** | **0** | **0** | **50** | | **0** |

==== Races by year ====
(key)

| Year | Class | Bike | 1 | 2 | 3 | 4 | 5 | 6 | 7 | 8 | 9 | 10 | 11 | 12 | 13 | 14 | Pos | Pts |
|---|---|---|---|---|---|---|---|---|---|---|---|---|---|---|---|---|---|---|
| 2016 | Superstock 600 | Honda | VAL | VAL | ARA | ARA | CAT; 1 | CAT; 1 | ALB | ALB | ALG | ALG | JER | JER | VAL | VAL | 1st* | 50* |

* Season still in progress

=== Grand Prix motorcycle racing ===
==== By season ====
| Season | Class | Bike | Team | Number | Race | Win | Pod | Pole | FLap | Pts | Plcd | WCh |
|---|---|---|---|---|---|---|---|---|---|---|---|---|
| 2012 | Moto2 | Speed Up S12 | QMMF Racing Team; QMMF Evalube Racing Team | 97 | 1 | 0 | 0 | 0 | 0 | 0 | NC | 0 |
| 2013 | Moto2 | Speed Up SF13 | QMMF Racing Team; QMMF Evalube Racing Team | 97 | 17 | 0 | 0 | 0 | 0 | 0 | NC | 0 |
| 2018 | Moto2 | Suter MMX2 | Forward Racing Team | 50 | 1 | 0 | 0 | 0 | 0 | 0 | 46th | 0 |
| Total | | | | | **19** | **0** | **0** | **0** | **0** | **0** | | **0** |

==== By class ====
| Class | Seasons | 1st GP | 1st Pod | 1st Win | Race | Win | Podiums | Pole | FLap | Pts | WChmp |
|---|---|---|---|---|---|---|---|---|---|---|---|
| Moto2 | 2012–2013, 2018 | 2012 Valencia | – | – | 19 | 0 | 0 | 0 | 0 | 0 | – |
| Total | 2012–Present | | | | **19** | **0** | **0** | **0** | **0** | **0** | - |

==== Races by year ====
(key)

| Year | Class | Bike | 1 | 2 | 3 | 4 | 5 | 6 | 7 | 8 | 9 | 10 | 11 | 12 | 13 | 14 | 15 | 16 | 17 | 18 | 19 | Pos | Pts |
|---|---|---|---|---|---|---|---|---|---|---|---|---|---|---|---|---|---|---|---|---|---|---|---|
| 2012 | Moto2 | Speed Up | QAT | SPA | POR | FRA | CAT | GBR | NED | GER | ITA | INP | CZE | RSM | ARA | JPN | MAL | AUS | VAL; 30 | | | NC | 0 |
| 2013 | Moto2 | Speed Up | QAT; 26 | AME; Ret | SPA; 27 | FRA; 23 | ITA; Ret | CAT; Ret | NED; 27 | GER; 27 | INP; 30 | CZE; 25 | GBR; 27 | RSM; 25 | ARA; 25 | MAL; 24 | AUS; 20 | JPN; Ret | VAL; Ret | | | NC | 0 |
| 2018 | Moto2 | Suter | QAT | ARG | AME | SPA | FRA | ITA | CAT | NED | GER | CZE | AUT | GBR | RSM | ARA | THA | JPN | AUS | MAL; 26 | VAL | 46th | 0 |

=== Asia Production 250 ===
==== Races by year ====
(key) (Races in bold indicate pole position; races in italics indicate fastest lap)

| Year | Bike | 1 | | 2 | | 3 | | 4 | | 5 | | Pos | Pts |
| Year | Bike | R1 | R2 | R1 | R2 | R1 | R2 | R1 | R2 | R1 | R2 | Pos | Pts |
|---|---|---|---|---|---|---|---|---|---|---|---|---|---|
| 2022 | Honda | CHA; 4 | CHA; 2 | SEP; 10 | SEP; 9 | SUG; 7 | SUG; 6 | SEP; 7 | SEP; 17 | CHA; 11 | CHA; Ret | 9th | 79 |

=== Asia Production 250 ===
==== Races by year ====
(key) (Races in bold indicate pole position; races in italics indicate fastest lap)

| Year | Bike | 1 | | 2 | | 3 | | 4 | | 5 | | Pos | Pts |
| Year | Bike | R1 | R2 | R1 | R2 | R1 | R2 | R1 | R2 | R1 | R2 | Pos | Pts |
|---|---|---|---|---|---|---|---|---|---|---|---|---|---|
| 2022 | Honda | CHA; 4 | CHA; 2 | SEP; 10 | SEP; 9 | SUG; 7 | SUG; 6 | SEP; 7 | SEP; 17 | CHA; 11 | CHA; Ret | 9th | 79 |

=== Mandalika Racing Series ===
==== Races by year ====
(key) (Races in bold indicate pole position; races in italics indicate fastest lap)

| Year | Team | Bike | Class | Round 1 | | | Round 2 | | | Round 3 | | | Round 4 | | | Round 5 | | | Pos | Pts |
| Year | Team | Bike | Class | R1 | SP | R2 | R1 | SP | R2 | R1 | SP | R2 | R1 | SP | R2 | R1 | SP | R2 | Pos | Pts |
|---|---|---|---|---|---|---|---|---|---|---|---|---|---|---|---|---|---|---|---|---|
| 2023 | LFN HP969 HDS Racing Team | Honda | National Sport 250cc | MAN1; 4 | | MAN2; 6 | MAN1; 13 | | MAN2; 13 | MAN1 | | MAN2 | | | | | | | NA | NA |
| 2024 | R7 Racing Tech Indidaya HDS | Yamaha | National Sport 150cc | MAN1; Ret | | MAN2; Ret | MAN1 | | MAN2 | MAN1 | | MAN2 | MAN1 | | MAN2 | MAN1 | | MAN2 | NA | NA |
| 2024 | R7 Racing Tech Indidaya HDS | Yamaha | Underbone 150cc | MAN1; 5 | | MAN2; 7 | MAN1 | | MAN2 | MAN1; 4 | | MAN2; Ret | MAN1; Ret | | MAN2; Ret | MAN1 | | MAN2 | NA | NA |
| 2024 | RSeven Racing Tech | Yamaha | National Sport 250cc | MAN1 | | MAN2 | MAN1 | | MAN2 | MAN1 | | MAN2 | MAN1; Ret | | MAN2; DNS | MAN1 | | MAN2 | NA | NA |
