= Lukas Tulovic =

German motorcycle racer

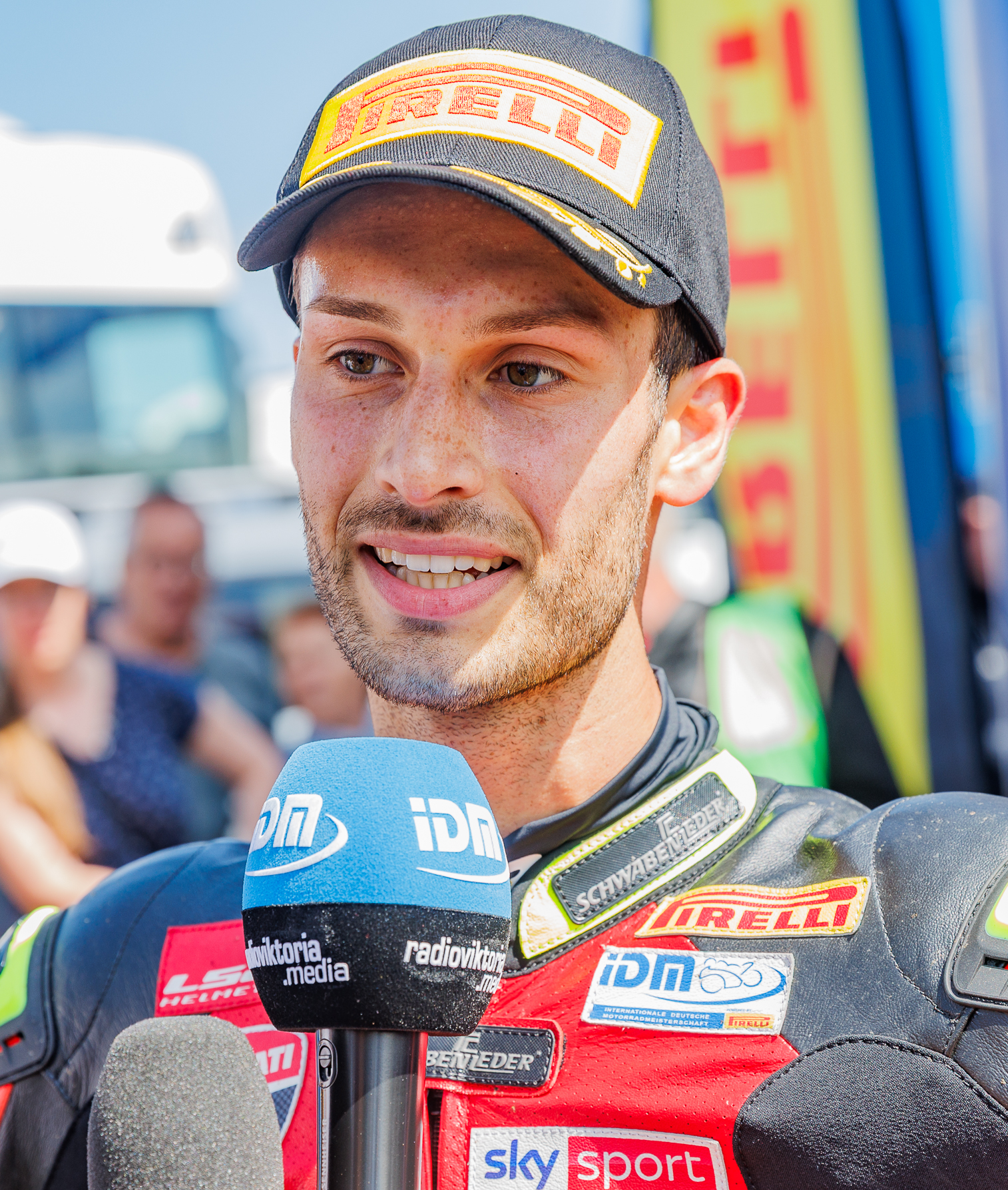
- Tulovic in 2025
- Nationality: German
- Born: 15 June 2000 (age 26); Eberbach, Germany
- Current team: Triple M Racing Ducati Frankfurt
- Bike number: 1
Motorcycle racing career statistics
Moto2 World Championship
Active years	2018–2019, 2023
Manufacturers	KTM (2018–2019); Suter (2018); Kalex (2023)
Championships	0
2023 championship position	24th (12 pts)
Starts / Wins / Podiums / Poles / F. laps / Points; 38 / 0 / 0 / 0 / 0 / 15
MotoE World Championship
Active years	2020–2022, 2024
Manufacturers	Energica, Ducati
2024 championship position	11th (111 pts)
Starts / Wins / Podiums / Poles / F. laps / Points; 30 / 1 / 1 / 0 / 0 / 222
Superbike World Championship
Active years	2025
Manufacturers	Ducati
2025 championship position	30th (0 pts)
Starts / Wins / Podiums / Poles / F. laps / Points; 3 / 0 / 0 / 0 / 0 / 0

Lukas Tulovic (born 15 June 2000) is a German motorcycle racer for Triple M Racing in EuroMoto. In 2019 and 2023, he competed in Grand Prix motorcycle racing, in the Moto2 class. He is the 2025 IDM Superbike Champion, and also the 2026 EuroMoto Superbike Champion.

== Career ==
From 2015 to 2022, Tulovic competed in the FIM Moto2 European Championship.

Tulovic made his Grand Prix debut in 2018, replacing the injured Dominique Aegerter at the Spanish Grand Prix. On August 15, 2021, Tulovic won his first Grand Prix in the MotoGP MotoE World Cup at the Red Bull Ring in Spielberg, and on October 9, 2022, Tulovic became the first German rider to ever win the FIM Moto2 European Championship.

Tulovic is managed by O1NE Sport GmbH.

In 2025, Tulovic competed in the IDM Superbike with Triple M Racing Ducati Frankfurt and managed to become the overall champion with 8 wins.

=== Moto2 World Championship ===
==== Liqui Moly Husqvarna Intact GP (2023) ====
From 2023, Tulovic raced for Liqui Moly Husqvarna Intact GP.

=== IDM Superbike // EuroMoto Series ===
==== IDM Superbike ====
In 2025, Tulovic raced for Triple M Racing Ducati Frankfurt and won the championship with 257.5 points.

==== EuroMoto ====
In 2026, Tulovic once again won the championship for Triple M Racing Ducati Frankfurt after Race 1 at the Hockenheimring, after he had finished fifth against Marcel Schrötter, who finished second.

== Career statistics ==
=== FIM Moto2 European Championship ===
==== Races by year ====
(key) (Races in bold indicate pole position, races in italics indicate fastest lap)

Year	Bike	1	2	3	4	5	6	7	8	9	10	11	12	Pos	Pts
2015	FTR Moto	ALG1	ALG2	CAT	ARA1	ARA2	ALB	NAV1	NAV2	JER; Ret	VAL1; Ret	VAL2; DNS		NC	0
2016	FTR Moto	VAL1; 17	VAL2; Ret	ARA1; 19	ARA2; 21	CAT1; 17	CAT2; Ret	ALB; 24	ALG1; 22	ALG2; 19				23rd	10
2016	Kalex										JER; 13	VAL; 9		23rd	10
2017	Kalex	ALB; 11	CAT1; Ret	CAT2; 9	VAL1; 5	VAL2; Ret	**EST1**; 4	**EST2**; 12	JER; 5	ARA1; 10	ARA2; Ret	VAL; Ret		9th	57
2018	Tech3	EST1; Ret	EST2; 3	VAL; Ret	CAT1; 5	CAT2; 3	ARA1; 4	ARA2; Ret	JER; 5	ALB1; 4	ALB2; Ret	VAL		8th	80
2020	Kalex	EST1; 3	EST2; Ret	POR1; Ret	POR2; 9	JER1; 6	JER2; 7	ARA1	ARA2	ARA3	VAL1; Ret	VAL2; 12		14th	46
2021	Kalex	**EST1**; Ret	**EST2**; 3	VAL; 4	CAT1; 3	CAT2; 3	POR1; 17	POR2; 4	ARA1; 4	ARA2; C	JER1; 3	JER2; 3	VAL; 3	3rd	135
2022	Kalex	**EST1**; 1	**EST2**; 1	**VAL**; 1	**CAT1**; 2	**CAT2**; 1	**JER**; 2	**POR1**; 2	**POR2**; 1	**ARA1**; 1	**ARA2**; 1	**VAL**; 1		1st	255

=== Grand Prix motorcycle racing ===
==== By season ====
Season	Class	Motorcycle	Team	Race	Win	Podium	Pole	FLap	Pts	Plcd
2018	Moto2	KTM	Kiefer Racing	2	0	0	0	0	0	38th
2018	Moto2	Suter	Forward Racing Team	1	0	0	0	0	0	38th
2019	Moto2	KTM	Kiefer Racing	19	0	0	0	0	3	29th
2020	MotoE	Energica	Tech3 E-Racing	7	0	0	0	0	39	11th
2021	MotoE	Energica	Tech3 E-Racing	7	1	1	0	0	62	8th
2022	MotoE	Energica	WithU GRT RNF MotoE Team	2	0	0	0	0	10	19th
2023	Moto2	Kalex	Liqui Moly Husqvarna Intact GP	16	0	0	0	0	12	24th
2024	MotoE	Ducati	Dynavolt Intact GP MotoE	14	0	0	0	0	111	11th
Total				**68**	**1**	**1**	**0**	**0**	**237**	

==== By class ====
Class	Seasons	1st GP	1st pod	1st win	Race	Win	Podiums	Pole	FLap	Pts	WChmp
Moto2	2018–2019, 2023	2018 Spain			38	0	0	0	0	15	0
MotoE	2020–2022, 2024	2020 Spain	2021 Austria	2021 Austria	30	1	1	0	0	222	0
Total	2018–2024				**68**	**1**	**1**	**0**	**0**	**237**	**0**

==== Races by year ====
(key) (Races in bold indicate pole position; races in italics indicate fastest lap)

Year	Class	Bike	1	2	3	4	5	6	7	8	9	10	11	12	13	14	15	16	17	18	19	20	Pos	Pts
2018	Moto2	KTM	QAT	ARG	AME	SPA; 20	FRA; 23	ITA	CAT	NED	GER	CZE	AUT	GBR	RSM	ARA	THA	JPN	AUS	MAL			38th	0
2018	Moto2	Suter																			VAL; 20		38th	0
2019	Moto2	KTM	QAT; 21	ARG; 18	AME; 19	SPA; 19	FRA; 16	ITA; 20	CAT; 24	NED; 13	GER; 24	CZE; Ret	AUT; 27	GBR; 26	RSM; 22	ARA; 25	THA; Ret	JPN; Ret	AUS; 24	MAL; 22	VAL; Ret		29th	3
2020	MotoE	Energica	SPA; 4	ANC; 6	RSM; 12	EMI1; Ret	EMI2; 15	FRA1; 10	FRA2; 11														11th	39
2021	MotoE	Energica	SPA; Ret	FRA; 7	CAT; 8	NED; 5	AUT; 1	RSM1; 8	RSM2; 15														8th	62
2022	MotoE	Energica	SPA1; 10	SPA2; 12	FRA1	FRA2	ITA1	ITA2	NED1	NED2	AUT1	AUT2	RSM1	RSM2									19th	10
2023	Moto2	Kalex	POR; DNS	ARG	AME; Ret	SPA; 15	FRA; 11	ITA; Ret	GER; Ret	NED; 16	GBR; 16	AUT; 10	CAT; 19	RSM; Ret	IND; DNS	JPN	INA; 22	AUS; 20	THA; 23	MAL; 24	QAT; Ret	VAL; Ret	24th	12
2024	MotoE	Ducati	POR1; 4	POR2; 6	FRA1; 11	FRA2; 6	CAT1; Ret	CAT2; 6	ITA1; DNS	ITA2; DNS	NED1; 7	NED2; 4	GER1; 7	GER2; 10	AUT1; 8	AUT2; 7	RSM1; 7	RSM2; 17					11th	111

=== IDM Superbike Championship ===
==== By year ====
(key) (Races in bold indicate pole position; races in italics indicate fastest lap)

Year	Class	Bike	1		2		3		4		5		6		7		Pos	Pts
Year	Class	Bike	R1	R2	R1	R2	R1	R2	R1	R2	R1	R2	R1	R2	R1	R2	Pos	Pts
2025	Superbike	Ducati	**OSC**; Ret	**OSC**; 1	SCH; 2	SCH; 1	**CZE**; 3	**CZE**; Ret	**OSC**; 1	**OSC**; 1	**NED**; 2	**NED**; 1	**NÜR**; 1	NÜR; 1	HOC; 1	HOC; 7	1st	257.5

=== Superbike World Championship ===
==== By season ====
Season	Motorcycle	Team	Race	Win	Podium	Pole	FLap	Pts	Plcd
2025	Ducati Panigale V4	Team Triple M Ducati Frankfurt	3	0	0	0	0	0	30th
Total			**3**	**0**	**0**	**0**	**0**	**0**	

==== Races by year ====
Year	Bike	1			2			3			4			5			6			7			8			9			10			11			12			Pos.	Pts
Year	Bike	R1	SR	R2	R1	SR	R2	R1	SR	R2	R1	SR	R2	R1	SR	R2	R1	SR	R2	R1	SR	R2	R1	SR	R2	R1	SR	R2	R1	SR	R2	R1	SR	R2	R1	SR	R2	Pos.	Pts
2025	Ducati	AUS	AUS	AUS	POR	POR	POR	NED	NED	NED	ITA	ITA	ITA	CZE	CZE	CZE	EMI	EMI	EMI	GBR	GBR	GBR	HUN	HUN	HUN	FRA	FRA	FRA	ARA	ARA	ARA	POR	POR	POR	SPA; 17	SPA; 16	SPA; Ret	30th	0
