= 2015 FIM CEV Moto2 European Championship =

2015 FIM CEV Moto2 European Championship
Previous:	2014	Next:	2016
Support series: FIM CEV Moto3 Junior World Championship; FIM CEV Superbike European Championship

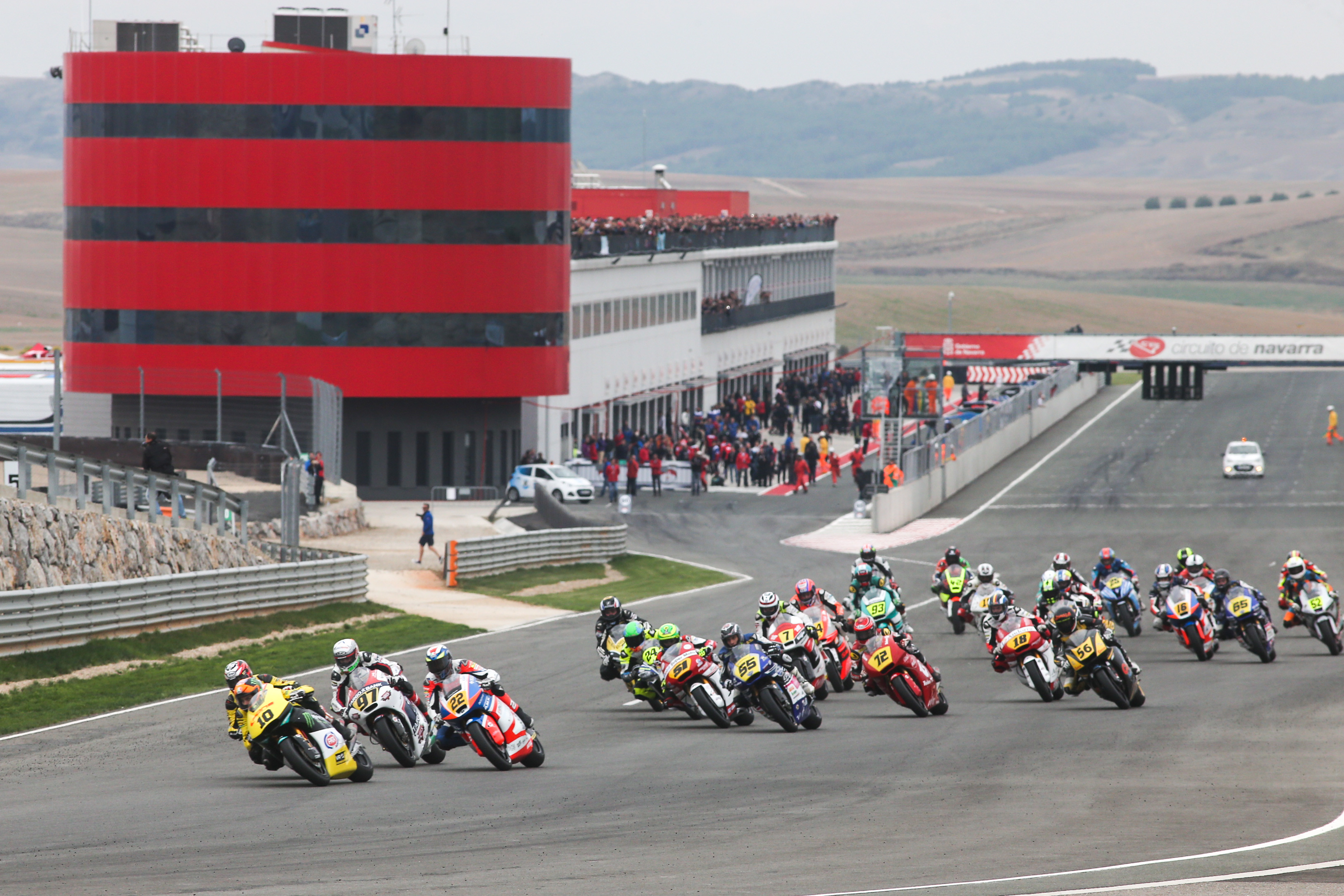
A race start in Navarra

The 2015 FIM CEV Moto2 European Championship was the sixth CEV Moto2 season and the first under the FIM banner. The season was held over 11 races at 7 meetings, began on 26 April at Algarve and finished on 15 November at Valencia.

== Calendar ==
Round	Date	Circuit	Pole position	Fastest lap	Race winner	Winning constructor	Sources
1	26 April	(Portugal) Algarve	(Spain) Xavi Vierge	(Spain) Edgar Pons	(Spain) Edgar Pons	(Germany) Kalex	
1	26 April	(Portugal) Algarve	(Spain) Xavi Vierge	(Spain) Edgar Pons	(Spain) Xavi Vierge	(France) Tech 3	
2	21 June	(Spain) Catalunya	(Spain) Edgar Pons	(Spain) Edgar Pons	(Spain) Edgar Pons	(Germany) Kalex	
3	5 July	(Spain) Aragón	(Spain) Edgar Pons	(Spain) Edgar Pons	(Spain) Edgar Pons	(Germany) Kalex	
3	5 July	(Spain) Aragón	(Spain) Edgar Pons	(South Africa) Steven Odendaal	(Spain) Edgar Pons	(Germany) Kalex	
4	6 September	(Spain) Albacete	(Spain) Xavi Vierge	(Spain) Edgar Pons	(Spain) Xavi Vierge	(Germany) Kalex	
5	4 October	(Spain) Navarra	(France) Alan Techer	(Spain) Edgar Pons	(Spain) Xavi Vierge	(France) Tech 3	
5	4 October	(Spain) Navarra	(France) Alan Techer	(Spain) Xavi Vierge	(Spain) Edgar Pons	(Germany) Kalex	
6	1 November	(Spain) Jerez	(Spain) Edgar Pons	(Japan) Tetsuta Nagashima	(Spain) Xavi Vierge	(France) Tech 3	
7	15 November	(Spain) Valencia	(Spain) Xavi Vierge	(Spain) Edgar Pons	(Spain) Xavi Vierge	(France) Tech 3	
7	15 November	(Spain) Valencia	(Spain) Xavi Vierge	(Spain) Xavi Vierge	(Spain) Xavi Vierge	(France) Tech 3	

== Entry list ==
Team	Bike	No.	Rider	Rounds
Moto2
(Austria) Interwetten Fritze Tuning (Austria) Fritze Tuning	FTR	2	(Austria) Marco Nekvasil	1–4
(Austria) Interwetten Fritze Tuning (Austria) Fritze Tuning	FTR	13	(Australia) Anthony West	6
(Austria) Interwetten Fritze Tuning (Austria) Fritze Tuning	FTR	33	(Germany) Lukas Tulovic	6–7
(Spain) MR Griful	MVR	3	(Spain) Diego Pérez	1–2
(Spain) MR Griful	MVR	13	(Netherlands) Jasper Iwema	1
(Spain) MR Griful	MVR	74	(Argentina) Andrés González	1–3
(Spain) MR Griful	MVR	80	(Spain) Xavier Pinsach	7
(Switzerland) Swiss Junior Team Moto2	Suter	7	(Spain) Iker Lecuona	5, 7
(Switzerland) Swiss Junior Team Moto2	Suter	28	(Switzerland) Alexandre Soguel	1–3
(Switzerland) Swiss Junior Team Moto2	Suter	34	(Switzerland) Adrien Pittet	1–5, 7
(Switzerland) Swiss Junior Team Moto2	Suter	42	(Switzerland) Stéphane Frossard	1–3
(Switzerland) Swiss Junior Team Moto2	Suter	62	(Argentina) Juan Solorza	4
(France) JEG Racing	Suter	8	(France) Thibaut Bertin	All
(France) JEG Racing	Suter	94	(Switzerland) Damien Raemy	1–3
(Spain) Paginas Amarillas HP40 Junior Team	Kalex	10	(Italy) Luca Marini	All
(Spain) Paginas Amarillas HP40 Junior Team	Kalex	57	(Spain) Edgar Pons	All
(Italy) Vyrus-Racing	Vyrus	11	(Italy) Fabrizio Perotti	7
(Italy) Vyrus-Racing	Vyrus	82	(United Kingdom) Bradley Ray	1–2, 5
Pertamina Team Indonesia	Kalex	12	(Indonesia) Adrian Rusmiputro	1
(Spain) H43 Team Talasur-Blumaq (Spain) H43 Team Nobby Blumaq-Talasur	H43	15	(Norway) Thomas Sigvartsen	All
(Spain) H43 Team Talasur-Blumaq (Spain) H43 Team Nobby Blumaq-Talasur	H43	43	(Spain) Bartolomé Sánchez	1, 4–5
(Spain) H43 Team Talasur-Blumaq (Spain) H43 Team Nobby Blumaq-Talasur	H43	46	(Switzerland) Marcel Brenner	1–5, 7
(Spain) H43 Team Talasur-Blumaq (Spain) H43 Team Nobby Blumaq-Talasur	Kalex	47	(Germany) Marc Buchner	1–3, 6–7
(Italy) Team Ciatti	Suter	16	(Italy) Gabriele Ruju	2–7
(Italy) Team Ciatti	Suter	22	(Italy) Federico Fuligni	All
(Spain) Promoracing	Kalex	18	(Andorra) Xavier Cardelús	All
(Spain) Promoracing	Kalex	51	(Brazil) Eric Granado	All
(Japan) Astra Honda Team Asia	Kalex	20	(Indonesia) Dimas Ekky Pratama	1–2, 4, 6–7
(Spain) Team Stratos	Ariane	24	(Spain) Marcos Ramírez	6
(Spain) Team Stratos	Ariane	55	(Spain) Alejandro Medina	1–5, 7
(Spain) Team Stratos	Ariane	65	(United Kingdom) Nikki Coates	All
(Spain) Team Stratos	Ariane	71	(Chile) Maximilian Scheib	1–4
(Spain) DVRacing	Kalex	32	(Germany) Max Enderlein	3–7
(Spain) DVRacing	Inmotec	77	(Spain) Miquel Pons	1, 3–7
(Switzerland) Stef Racing Team	Suter	42	(Switzerland) Stéphane Frossard	4–7
(Spain) AGR Team	Kalex	44	(South Africa) Steven Odendaal	All
(Australia) Champi Team	FTR	52	(Australia) Corey Turner	1–3
(Australia) Champi Team	Suter	52	(Australia) Corey Turner	4–5, 7
(Austria) Cofain Racing Team	FTR	56	(Austria) Thomas Gradinger	All
(Japan) Teluru TSR	Kalex	72	(Japan) Tetsuta Nagashima	All
(Spain) Bullit Cuna de Campeones	MIR Racing	84	(Spain) Julián Miralles	All
(Spain) Team Targobank Motorsport	Tech 3	89	(France) Alan Techer	All
(Spain) Team Targobank Motorsport	Tech 3	97	(Spain) Xavi Vierge	All
(France) Promoto Sport	TransFIORmers	90	(France) Lucas Mahias	6–7
Petronas AHM Motorsport; Petronas AHM Malaysia	Kalex	93	(Malaysia) Ramdan Rosli	All
Superstock 600
(Spain) Autos Arroyo Pastrana Racing Team	Yamaha	4	(Spain) Juan Cárdenas	6
(Spain) Autos Arroyo Pastrana Racing Team	Yamaha	24	(Spain) Marcos Ramírez	1, 4–5, 7
(Spain) Autos Arroyo Pastrana Racing Team	Yamaha	38	(Spain) Borja Quero	5
(Spain) Autos Arroyo Pastrana Racing Team	Yamaha	41	(Spain) Jorge Arroyo	1
(Spain) Autos Arroyo Pastrana Racing Team	Yamaha	85	(Spain) Abián Santana	6–7
(Spain) Autos Arroyo Pastrana Racing Team	Yamaha	98	(Spain) Christian Palomares	5, 7
(Spain) PPRT-Speed Motos Estepona (Spain) PPRT-Speed Motos (Spain) Speed Motos-PPRT	Yamaha	7	(Spain) Juan Ortiz	4, 6
(Spain) PPRT-Speed Motos Estepona (Spain) PPRT-Speed Motos (Spain) Speed Motos-PPRT	Yamaha	21	(Spain) Rafa Román	6
(Spain) PPRT-Speed Motos Estepona (Spain) PPRT-Speed Motos (Spain) Speed Motos-PPRT	Honda	39	(Spain) Daniel Torreño	2, 4, 6
(Norway) Team Stinius Viking Racing	Yamaha	14	(Norway) Stinius Ødegård	6–7
(Argentina) GVRacing	Yamaha	25	(Argentina) Juan Solorza	5
(Spain) Racing Team VST	Yamaha	50	(Spain) Hugo Abadie	7
(Portugal) Target-Yamaha-FMP-Union	Yamaha	58	(Portugal) Pedro Romero	4
(Australia) Champi-Middem Racing Team	Yamaha	73	(Italy) Jacopo Cretaro	7
(Portugal) Pequeno Motos	Yamaha	75	(Portugal) Ivo Lopes	1
(Italy) Bike e Motor Racing Team	Yamaha	81	(Italy) Alex Bernardi	7
(Australia) Alba Racing	Kawasaki	83	(Australia) Lachlan Epis	4, 6–7
(Spain) Fricar Team	Yamaha	85	(Spain) Abián Santana	1–3
(Norway) Flathaug Racing	Honda	86	(Norway) Henning Flathaug	6–7

== Championship standings ==
Pos.	Rider	Bike	ALG (Portugal)		CAT (Spain)	ARA (Spain)		ALB (Spain)	NAV (Spain)		JER (Spain)	VAL (Spain)		Pts
Moto2
1	(Spain) Edgar Pons	Kalex	1	2	**1**	**1**	**1**	2	3	1	**3**	2	2	237
2	(Spain) Xavi Vierge	Tech 3	**2**	**1**	Ret	3	2	**1**	1	2	1	**1**	**1**	226
3	(France) Alan Techer	Tech 3	6	5	3	7	6	5	**2**	**5**	5	5	4	133
4	(South Africa) Steven Odendaal	Kalex	3	Ret	4	2	3	3	Ret	6	10	4	7	119
5	(Italy) Luca Marini	Kalex	5	4	2	Ret	7	4	4	4	4	Ret	6	115
6	(Brazil) Eric Granado	Kalex	4	3	8	5	5	7	Ret	3	7	6	5	114
7	(Japan) Tetsuta Nagashima	Kalex	7	6	5	6	8	13	5	7	2	Ret	3	107
8	(Spain) Alejandro Medina	Ariane	8	7	6	11	9	6	6	9		15	Ret	67
9	(Italy) Federico Fuligni	Suter	DNS	Ret	9	4	4	8	Ret	DNS	8	28	8	57
10	(France) Thibaut Bertin	Suter	14	19	11	10	10	12	Ret	13	11	8	10	45
11	(Switzerland) Adrien Pittet	Suter	15	9	Ret	18	14	Ret	7	10		11	13	33
12	(Malaysia) Ramdan Rosli	Kalex	16	22	Ret	9	Ret	9	12	15	13	7	Ret	31
13	(Indonesia) Dimas Ekky Pratama	Kalex	11	29	10			Ret			12	9	9	29
14	(Spain) Miquel Pons	Inmotec	9	30		14	13	10	10	Ret	17	13	14	29
15	(Spain) Marcos Ramírez	Yamaha	18	17				14	8	11		12	16	26
15	(Spain) Marcos Ramírez	Ariane									9			26
16	(Andorra) Xavier Cardelús	Kalex	10	Ret	Ret	13	11	16	13	12	DNS	18	Ret	21
17	(Italy) Gabriele Ruju	Suter			7	8	Ret	28	Ret	DNS	16	14	15	20
18	(Spain) Iker Lecuona	Suter							9	8		Ret	11	20
19	(Austria) Marco Nekvasil	FTR	19	11	12	Ret	12	11						18
20	(France) Lucas Mahias	TransFIORmers									Ret	3	Ret	16
21	(Chile) Maximilian Scheib	Ariane	13	8	14	15	15	17						15
22	(Australia) Anthony West	FTR									6			10
23	(Spain) Diego Pérez	MVR	12	10	16									10
24	(Austria) Thomas Gradinger	FTR	Ret	23	Ret	12	Ret	Ret	Ret	16	14	Ret	12	10
25	(Norway) Thomas Sigvartsen	H43	24	19	Ret	Ret	18	20	15	19	18	10	21	7
26	(Spain) Julián Miralles	MIR Racing	27	21	17	19	19	19	11	14	19	16	17	7
27	(United Kingdom) Nikki Coates	Ariane	21	12	13	17	17	24	16	22	20	21	Ret	7
28	(Switzerland) Marcel Brenner	H43	25	13	Ret	23	22	18	Ret	Ret		23	25	3
29	(Germany) Max Enderlein	Kalex				20	16	Ret	14	18	15	17	Ret	3
30	(Switzerland) Stéphane Frossard	Suter	17	14	Ret	22	21	26	22	24	21	19	18	2
31	(Argentina) Juan Solorza	Suter						15	18	17				1
32	(Germany) Marc Buchner	Kalex	22	26	15	21	20				25	Ret	Ret	1
33	(Spain) Bartolomé Sánchez	H43	30	15				21	17	20				1
	(Australia) Corey Turner	FTR	26	24	18	16	Ret							0
	(Australia) Corey Turner	Suter						23	19	21		20	27	0
	(United Kingdom) Bradley Ray	Vyrus	20	16	Ret				23	25				0
	(Spain) Xavier Pinsach	MVR										Ret	19	0
	(Argentina) Juan Solorza	Yamaha							18	17				0
	(Portugal) Ivo Lopes	Yamaha	23	18										0
	(Switzerland) Alexandre Soguel	Suter	32	27	19	25	25							0
	(Spain) Abián Santana	Yamaha	34	25	20	26	26				24	22	23	0
	(Spain) Christian Palomares	Yamaha							20	Ret		Ret	22	0
	(Argentina) Andrés González	MVR	28	20	Ret	Ret	23							0
	(Italy) Jacopo Cretaro	Yamaha										Ret	20	0
	(Spain) Borja Quero	Yamaha							21	23				0
	(Portugal) Pedro Romero	Yamaha						22						0
	(Norway) Henning Flathaug	Honda									22	Ret	Ret	0
	(Australia) Lachlan Epis	Kawasaki						25			23	26	26	0
	(Spain) Hugo Abadie	Yamaha										24	DSQ	0
	(Switzerland) Damien Raemy	Suter	33	28	Ret	24	24							0
	(Italy) Alex Bernardi	Yamaha										25	24	0
	(Spain) Daniel Torreño	Honda			DSQ			27			26			0
	(Italy) Fabrizio Perotti	Vyrus										27	Ret	0
	(Norway) Stinius Ødegård	Yamaha									27	Ret	Ret	0
	(Spain) Juan Ortiz	Yamaha						Ret			28			0
	(Spain) Juan Cárdenas	Yamaha									29			0
	(Spain) Jorge Arroyo	Yamaha	29	Ret										0
	(Netherlands) Jasper Iwema	MVR	31	Ret										0
	(Germany) Lukas Tulovic	FTR									Ret	Ret	DNS	0
	(Spain) Rafa Román	Yamaha									Ret			0
	(Indonesia) Adrian Rusmiputro	Kalex	Ret	Ret										0
Superstock 600
1	(Spain) Marcos Ramírez	Yamaha	18	17				14	8	11		12	16	175
2	(Spain) Abián Santana	Yamaha	34	25	20	26	26				24	22	23	153
3	(Australia) Lachlan Epis	Kawasaki						25			23	26	26	57
4	(Argentina) Juan Solorza	Yamaha							18	17				40
5	(Portugal) Ivo Lopes	Yamaha	23	18										40
6	(Spain) Christian Palomares	Yamaha							20	Ret		Ret	22	32
7	(Spain) Borja Quero	Yamaha							21	23				29
8	(Spain) Daniel Torreño	Honda			DSQ			27			26			26
9	(Norway) Henning Flathaug	Honda									22	Ret	Ret	25
10	(Italy) Alex Bernardi	Yamaha										25	24	24
11	(Italy) Jacopo Cretaro	Yamaha										Ret	20	20
12	(Portugal) Pedro Romero	Yamaha						22						20
13	(Spain) Hugo Abadie	Yamaha										24	DSQ	16
14	(Spain) Jorge Arroyo	Yamaha	29	Ret										16
15	(Norway) Stinius Ødegård	Yamaha									27	Ret	Ret	11
16	(Spain) Juan Ortiz	Yamaha						Ret			28			10
17	(Spain) Juan Cárdenas	Yamaha									29			9
	(Spain) Rafa Román	Yamaha									Ret			0
Pos.	Rider	Bike	ALG (Portugal)		CAT (Spain)	ARA (Spain)		ALB (Spain)	NAV (Spain)		JER (Spain)	VAL (Spain)		Pts

Colour	Result
Gold	Winner
Silver	Second place
Bronze	Third place
Green	Points classification
Blue	Non-points classification
Blue	Non-classified finish (NC)
Purple	Retired, not classified (Ret)
Red	Did not qualify (DNQ)
Red	Did not pre-qualify (DNPQ)
Black	Disqualified (DSQ)
White	Did not start (DNS)
White	Withdrew (WD)
White	Race cancelled (C)
Blank	Did not practice (DNP)
Blank	Did not arrive (DNA)
Blank	Excluded (EX)

**Bold** – Pole position
Italics – Fastest lap

== See also ==
- 2015 FIM CEV Moto3 Junior World Championship
