= Alan Techer =

French motorcycle racer

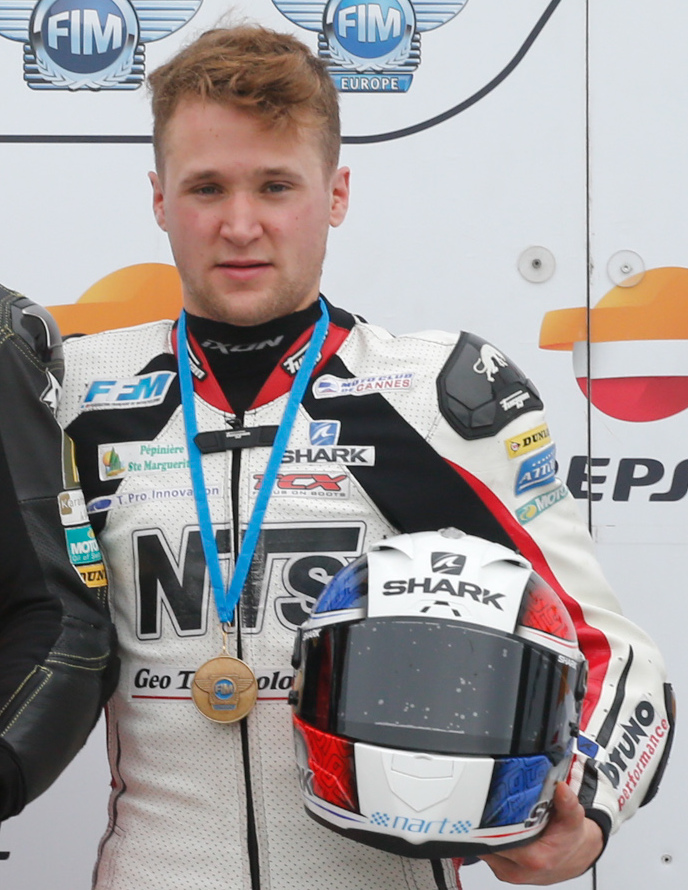
- Techer in 2016
- Nationality: French
- Born: 8 September 1994 (age 32); Cannes, France
Motorcycle racing career statistics
Moto2 World Championship
Active years	2016
Manufacturers	NTS
Championships	0
2016 championship position	NC (0 pts)
Starts / Wins / Podiums / Poles / F. laps / Points; 1 / 0 / 0 / 0 / 0 / 0
Moto3 World Championship
Active years	2012–2013
Manufacturers	TSR Honda
2013 championship position	23rd (8 pts)
Starts / Wins / Podiums / Poles / F. laps / Points; 32 / 0 / 0 / 0 / 0 / 29

Alan Techer (born 8 September 1994 in Cannes) is an endurance world champion solo motorcycle racer from France, competing in the EWC championship with Tati Team Beringer Racing. Techer has competed in the French 125 cc Championship, the Spanish 125GP Championship, the FIM CEV Moto2 European Championship and the Red Bull MotoGP Rookies Cup.

Techer was part of the FIM Endurance World Championship-winning team in 2018, and in September 2022, as a substitute rider due to Gino Rea's injury, was part of the team which clinched the 2022 Endurance World Championship title at the last event of the season, the Bol d'Or race. .

== Career statistics ==
=== Red Bull MotoGP Rookies Cup ===
==== Races by year ====
(key) (Races in bold indicate pole position, races in italics indicate fastest lap)

Year	1	2	3	4	5	6	7	8	9	10	11	12	13	14	Pos	Pts
2010	ESP1; 9	ESP2; Ret	ITA	NED1	NED2	GER1	GER2	CZE1; Ret	CZE2; DNS	RSM; 10					22nd	13
2011	ESP1; 3	ESP2; Ret	POR1; 4	POR2; 4	**GBR1**; 6	**GBR2**; 3	NED1; Ret	NED2; 4	ITA; 8	GER1; 4	GER2; 1	CZE1; Ret	CZE2; 1	RSM; 6	3rd	162

=== FIM CEV Moto2 European Championship ===
==== Races by year ====
(key)

Year	Bike	1	2	3	4	5	6	7	8	9	10	11	Pos	Pts
2014	Tech 3	JER; 3	ARA1; 2	ARA2; Ret	CAT; 5	ALB; Ret	NAV1; 3	NAV2; Ret	ALG1; Ret	ALG2; 3	VAL; Ret		6th	79
2015	Tech3	ALG1; 6	ALG2; 5	CAT; 3	ARA1; 7	ARA2; 6	ALB; 5	**NAV1**; 2	**NAV2**; 5	JER; 5	VAL1; 5	VAL2; 4	3rd	133
2016	NTS	VAL1; 3	VAL2; 2	ARA1; 3	ARA2; 2	CAT1; Ret	CAT2; DNS	ALB; 3	ALG1; 3	ALG2; 2	JER; 1	VAL; 4	3rd	162

=== Grand Prix motorcycle racing ===
==== By season ====
Season	Class	Motorcycle	Team	Number	Race	Win	Podium	Pole	FLap	Pts	Plcd
2012	Moto3	TSR Honda	Technomag-CIP-TSR	89	16	0	0	0	0	21	22nd
2013	Moto3	TSR Honda	CIP Moto3	89	16	0	0	0	0	8	23rd
2016	Moto2	NTS	NTS T Pro Project	89	1	0	0	0	0	0	NC
Total					**33**	**0**	**0**	**0**	**0**	**29**	

==== Races by year ====
(key)

Yr	Class	Bike	1	2	3	4	5	6	7	8	9	10	11	12	13	14	15	16	17	18	Pos	Pts
2012	Moto3	TSR Honda	QAT; 11	SPA; 14	POR; 17	FRA; 8	CAT; 13	GBR; 21	NED; 17	GER; 13	ITA; 17	INP; Ret	CZE; DNS	RSM; Ret	ARA; 21	JPN; 20	MAL; 21	AUS; 16	VAL; 21		22nd	21
2013	Moto3	TSR Honda	QAT; Ret	AME; Ret	SPA; Ret	FRA; 23	ITA; 20	CAT; 13	NED; 18	GER; 19	INP; 13	CZE; 19	GBR; Ret	RSM; 17	ARA; Ret	MAL; Ret	AUS; 25	JPN; 14	VAL; DNS		23rd	8
2016	Moto2	NTS	QAT	ARG	AME	SPA	FRA	ITA	CAT	NED	GER	AUT	CZE	GBR	RSM	ARA; Ret	JPN	AUS	MAL	VAL	NC	0

=== FIM World Endurance Championship ===
==== By team ====
Year	Team	Bike	Rider	TC
2017–18	(Japan) F.C.C. TSR Honda France	Honda CBR1000RR	(France) Freddy Foray (United Kingdom) Josh Hook (France) Alan Techer	**1st**
2022	(Japan) F.C.C. TSR Honda France	Honda CBR1000RR	(Australia) Joshua Hook (France) Mike Di Meglio (United Kingdom) Gino Rea (France) Alan Techer	**1st**

Year	Team	Bike	Tyre	Rider	Pts	TC
2025	(France) F.C.C. TSR Honda	Honda CBR1000RR	**B**	(France) Alan Techer (France) Valentin Perolari (Japan) Taiga Hada	58*	4th*

==== Suzuka 8 Hours results ====
Year	Class	Team	Co-riders	Bike	Pos
2025	**EWC**	(Japan) F.C.C. TSR Honda France	(France) Corentin Perolari (Japan) Taiga Hada	Honda CBR1000RR	Ret
2026	**EWC**	(Japan) F.C.C. TSR Honda France	(France) Corentin Perolari (United Kingdom) John McPhee	Honda CBR1000RR-R	26th

==== Spa 8 Hours Motos results ====
Year	Team	Riders	Bike	Pos
2025	(France) F.C.C. TSR Honda	(Japan) Taiga Hada (France) Valentin Perolari	Honda CBR1000RR	1st
