= Team Stratos =

Spanish motorcycle racing team

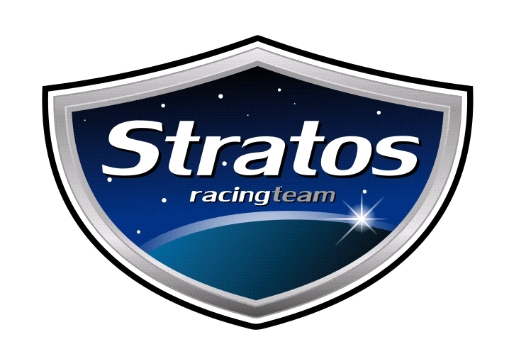
- 2015 name: Yamaha Stratos Team; Stock 1000
- Base: Spain
- Rider(s): SBK: 4. (Venezuela) Robertino Pietri; 33. (Finland) Niko Makinen; Moto2: 55. (Spain) Alejandro Medina; 65. (United Kingdom) Nikki Coates; Stock 1000: 22. (Spain) David Checa; 33. (Finland) Niko Makinen
- Motorcycle: Official: Yamaha; Moto2: Ariane Racing
- Tyres: SBK: Michelin; Moto2: Dunlop
- Riders' Championships: CEV Moto2; 2013: Román Ramos

Team Stratos is a Spanish motorcycle racing team. The team raced in 2015 CEV Moto2 Championship with Ariane Racing motorcycles and also competed in the European Superbike Championship with Yamaha motorcycles. In 2016 Team Yamaha Stratos competed in Spanish Road Racing Championship in Stock 1000 and Stock 600, and also in FIM CEV Moto2 European Championship in Moto2 and Stock 600 class.

In 2017 David Checa joined Team Yamaha Stratos in the RFME CEV Spanish Championship.
