= Edgar Pons =

Spanish motorcycle racer

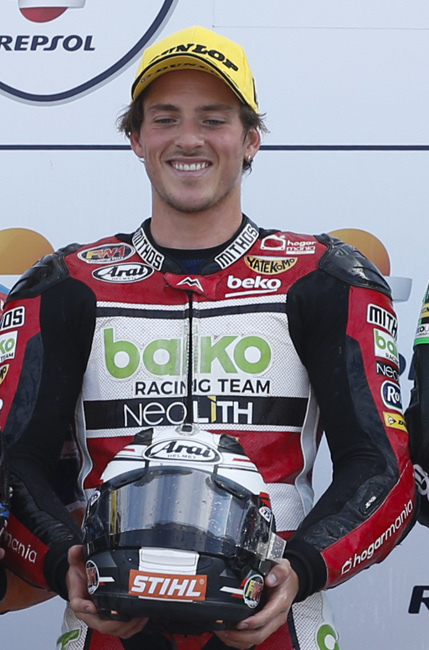
- Pons in 2019
- Nationality: Spanish
- Born: 16 June 1995 (age 31); Barcelona, Spain
- Bike number: 57
Motorcycle racing career statistics
Moto2 World Championship
Active years	2014–2018, 2020
Manufacturers	Kalex, Speed Up
Championships	0
2020 championship position	26th (5 pts)
Starts / Wins / Podiums / Poles / F. laps / Points; 62 / 0 / 0 / 0 / 0 / 12

Edgar Pons Ramón (born 16 June 1995 in Barcelona, Spain) is a Spanish former motorcycle racer. He was the FIM CEV Moto2 European champion in 2015 and 2019. He is son of Sito Pons and brother of Axel Pons.

== Career ==
Pons first appeared in the Moto2 World Championship either as a wild card or as a substitute in 2014 and 2015. He won the 2015 FIM CEV Moto2 European Championship and was a full-time rider in the World Championship in 2016 and 2017. Pons then spent two seasons in the FIM CEV Moto2 European Championship, winning the title in 2019, before joining the World Championship again in 2020. He announced his retirement from racing at the end of the season.

== Career statistics ==
=== FIM CEV Moto2 European Championship ===
==== Races by year ====
(key) (Races in bold indicate pole position, races in italics indicate fastest lap)

Year	Bike	1	2	3	4	5	6	7	8	9	10	11	Pos	Pts
2014	Tech3	JER; 1	ARA1; 5	ARA2; DNF	CAT; 7	ALB; 6	NAV1; 2	NAV2; 6	ALG1; 3	ALG2; 1	VAL; 3		3rd	142
2015	Kalex	ALG1; 1	ALG2; 2	**CAT**; 1	**ARA1**; 1	**ARA2**; 1	ALB; 2	NAV1; 3	NAV2; 1	**JER**; 3	VAL1; 2	VAL2; 2	1st	237
2018	Kalex	EST1; Ret	EST2; Ret	VAL; 2	CAT1; 3	CAT2; 4	**ARA1**; 1	**ARA2**; 1	JER; 1	**ALB1**; 6	**ALB2**; 4	**VAL**; 1	2nd	165.5
2019	Kalex	**EST1**; 2	**EST2**; 3	**VAL**; 1	**CAT1**; 1	**CAT2**; 1	**ARA1**; 6	**ARA2**; 1	JER; 1	**ALB1**; 1	**ALB2**; Ret	VAL; 1	1st	221

=== Grand Prix motorcycle racing ===
==== By season ====
Season	Class	Motorcycle	Team	Race	Win	Podium	Pole	FLap	Pts	Plcd
2014	Moto2	Kalex	Pons HP 40	1	0	0	0	0	0	NC
2015	Moto2	Kalex	Páginas Amarillas HP 40	8	0	0	0	0	0	NC
2015	Moto2	Kalex	Italtrans Racing Team	8	0	0	0	0	0	NC
2016	Moto2	Kalex	Páginas Amarillas HP 40	14	0	0	0	0	4	31st
2017	Moto2	Kalex	Pons HP40	18	0	0	0	0	2	34th
2018	Moto2	Kalex	AGR Team	2	0	0	0	0	1	31st
2018	Moto2	Speed Up	Speed Up Racing	4	0	0	0	0	1	31st
2020	Moto2	Kalex	Federal Oil Gresini Moto2	15	0	0	0	0	5	26th
Total				**62**	**0**	**0**	**0**	**0**	**12**	

==== By class ====
Class	Seasons	1st GP	1st Pod	1st Win	Race	Win	Podiums	Pole	FLap	Pts	WChmp
Moto2	2014–2018, 2020	2014 Spain			62	0	0	0	0	12	0
Total	2014–2018, 2020				**62**	**0**	**0**	**0**	**0**	**12**	**0**

==== Races by year ====
(key) (Races in bold indicate pole position, races in italics indicate fastest lap)

Year	Class	Bike	1	2	3	4	5	6	7	8	9	10	11	12	13	14	15	16	17	18	19	Pos	Pts
2014	Moto2	Kalex	QAT	AME	ARG	SPA; 25	FRA	ITA	CAT	NED	GER	INP	CZE	GBR	RSM	ARA	JPN	AUS	MAL	VAL		NC	0
2015	Moto2	Kalex	QAT	AME	ARG	SPA; 19	FRA	ITA	CAT; 17	NED	GER	INP	CZE; 22	GBR	RSM	ARA; Ret	JPN; 19	AUS; 22	MAL; 20	VAL; Ret		NC	0
2016	Moto2	Kalex	QAT; Ret	ARG; DNS	AME	SPA; DNS	FRA	ITA; 23	CAT; 17	NED; 23	GER; 14	AUT; 20	CZE; 20	GBR; 23	RSM; Ret	ARA; 24	JPN; 16	AUS; 14	MAL; 19	VAL; 19		31st	4
2017	Moto2	Kalex	QAT; 26	ARG; 16	AME; Ret	SPA; 17	FRA; 25	ITA; 20	CAT; 22	NED; 24	GER; 19	CZE; 28	AUT; 14	GBR; 22	RSM; Ret	ARA; 17	JPN; 27	AUS; Ret	MAL; 16	VAL; 20		34th	2
2018	Moto2	Kalex	QAT	ARG	AME	SPA	FRA	ITA	CAT; 16	NED	GER	CZE	AUT	GBR	RSM	ARA; 17						31st	1
2018	Moto2	Speed Up															THA; 19	JPN; 23	AUS; 15	MAL; 20	VAL	31st	1
2020	Moto2	Kalex	QAT; 16	SPA; 16	ANC; 16	CZE; 20	AUT; Ret	STY; 19	RSM; Ret	EMI; 20	CAT; 14	FRA; 19	ARA; 13	TER; Ret	EUR; 17	VAL; Ret	POR; Ret					26th	5
