= Steven Odendaal =

South African motorcycle racer

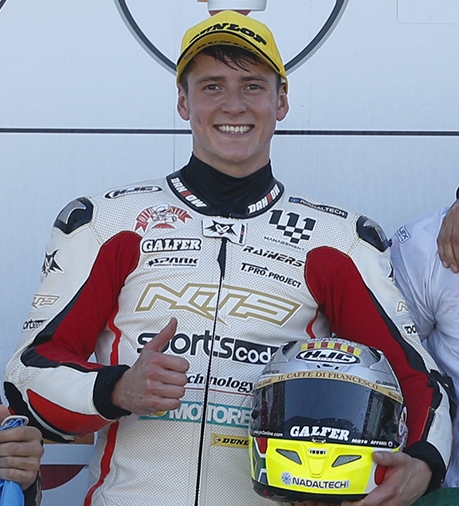
- Odendaal in 2017
- Nationality: South African
- Born: 2 March 1993 (age 33); Johannesburg, South Africa
- Current team: WRP-RT Motorsport by SKM
- Bike number: 4
- Website: stevenodendaal44.com
Motorcycle racing career statistics
Moto2 World Championship
Active years	2011–2013, 2015–2019
Manufacturers	Suter, AJR, Speed Up, Kalex, NTS
Championships	0
2019 championship position	31st (0 pts)
Starts / Wins / Podiums / Poles / F. laps / Points; 54 / 0 / 0 / 0 / 0 / 4
Supersport World Championship
Active years	2020–2022, 2024
Manufacturers	Yamaha, Triumph
Championships	0
2024 championship position	34th (5 pts)
Starts / Wins / Podiums / Poles / F. laps / Points; 44 / 5 / 12 / 0 / 1 / 480

Steven Odendaal (born 2 March 1993) is a South African motorcycle racer. He currently competes in the FIM Endurance World Championship with the BMW Motorrad EWC factory team.

== Career ==
Odendaal made a number of Moto2 World Championship appearances including a full season in 2013 with Team AGR Speed Up.

Odendaal won the South African national Super600 Championship in 2014 and 2015. In the European FIM CEV Repsol Championship, he finished fifth in 2014 and fourth in 2015 before claiming the title in 2016 (with six victories and nine podium finishes in 11 races) in Portimão, Portugal, two rounds ahead of the season's final.

In 2017, Odendaal joined the Project NTS with a brand new chassis to challenge for the European title again. He finished in third position overall in the FIM CEV Moto2 European Championship, claiming his third South African 600cc national title as well, despite missing four races due to his international commitments. In 2018–2019, Odendaal competed in the FIM Moto2 World Championship aboard the NTS chassis (full time debut season for the manufacturer) before making a switch to the Supersport World Championship in 2020, where he finished fifth overall in his debut season.

For 2021, Odendaal joined the Evan Bros. Yamaha team in World Supersport, winning the first three opening races of the season.

In 2022, Odendaal won the Bol d'Or 24 hour endurance race together with teammates Erwan Nigon and Florian Alt on a Yamaha R1. He finished third overall in the Endurance World Championship.

In 2025, Odendaal joined the BMW Motorrad factory EWC team alongside Sylvain Guintoli and Markus Reiterberger. The team was close to winning the world championship title when their engine broke down with 30 minutes to go of the final 24 hour race at Bol D'Or. In the same year, Odendaal won the title in the Spanish Superbike Championship (ESBK) with his Czech team New2Project (BMW).

== Career statistics ==
=== FIM CEV Moto2 European Championship ===
==== By season ====
Season	Class	Motorcycle	Race	Win	Podium	Pole	Pts	Plcd
2011	Moto2	Suter	6	0	0	0	0	NC
2012	Moto2	Suter	7	0	0	0	51	8th
2014	Moto2	Speed Up	10	0	3	0	94	5th
2015	Moto2	Kalex	11	0	4	0	119	4th
2016	Moto2	Kalex	11	6	9	4	206	**1st**
2017	Moto2	NTS	11	0	6	0	157	**3rd**
Total			**56**	**6**	**22**	**4**	**627**	

==== Races by year ====
(key) (Races in bold indicate pole position, races in italics indicate fastest lap)

Year	Bike	1	2	3	4	5	6	7	8	9	10	11	Pos	Pts
2015	Kalex	ALG1; 3	ALG2; Ret	CAT; 4	ARA1; 2	ARA2; 3	ALB; 3	NAV1; Ret	NAV2; 6	JER; 10	VAL1; 4	VAL2; 7	4th	119
2016	Kalex	VAL1; 2	VAL2; 1	**ARA1**; 1	**ARA2**; 1	CAT1; Ret	CAT2; 3	**ALB**; 1	ALG1; 1	ALG2; 1	**JER**; 2	**VAL**; Ret	1st	206
2017	NTS	ALB; 4	CAT1; 4	CAT2; 4	VAL1; 6	VAL2; 3	EST1; 3	EST2; 2	JER; 3	ARA1; 2	ARA2; Ret	VAL; 2	3rd	157

=== Grand Prix motorcycle racing ===
==== By season ====
Season	Class	Motorcycle	Team	Race	Win	Podium	Pole	FLap	Pts	Plcd
2011	Moto2	Suter	MS Racing	6	0	0	0	0	0	NC
2012	Moto2	AJR	Arguiñano Racing Team	2	0	0	0	0	0	NC
2013	Moto2	Speed Up	Argiñano & Gines Racing	16	0	0	0	0	0	NC
2015	Moto2	Kalex	AGR Team	1	0	0	0	0	0	NC
2016	Moto2	Kalex	AGR Team	1	0	0	0	0	0	34th
2017	Moto2	NTS	NTS	1	0	0	0	0	0	44th
2018	Moto2	NTS	NTS RW Racing GP	18	0	0	0	0	4	28th
2019	Moto2	NTS	NTS RW Racing GP	9	0	0	0	0	0	31st
Total				**54**	**0**	**0**	**0**	**0**	**4**	

==== Races by year ====
(key) (Races in bold indicate pole position, races in italics indicate fastest lap)

Year	Class	Bike	1	2	3	4	5	6	7	8	9	10	11	12	13	14	15	16	17	18	19	Pos	Pts
2011	Moto2	Suter	QAT	SPA; 32	POR; Ret	FRA; Ret	CAT	GBR	NED; Ret	ITA	GER; 27	CZE; 28	INP	RSM	ARA	JPN	AUS	MAL	VAL			NC	0
2012	Moto2	AJR	QAT	SPA	POR	FRA	CAT	GBR	NED	GER	ITA	INP	CZE	RSM; Ret	ARA; 20	JPN	MAL	AUS	VAL			NC	0
2013	Moto2	Speed Up	QAT; 22	AME; 22	SPA; 21	FRA; 20	ITA; Ret	CAT; Ret	NED; 22	GER; 25	INP; 27	CZE; Ret	GBR; DNS	RSM; 22	ARA; Ret	MAL; 20	AUS; 18	JPN; 19	VAL; 26			NC	0
2015	Moto2	Kalex	QAT	AME	ARG; 19	SPA	FRA	ITA	CAT	NED	GER	INP	CZE	GBR	RSM	ARA	JPN	AUS	MAL	VAL		NC	0
2016	Moto2	Kalex	QAT	ARG	AME	SPA	FRA	ITA	CAT	NED	GER	AUT	CZE	GBR	RSM	ARA; 18	JPN	AUS	MAL	VAL		34th	0
2017	Moto2	NTS	QAT	ARG	AME	SPA	FRA	ITA	CAT	NED	GER	CZE	AUT	GBR	RSM	ARA; 24	JPN	AUS	MAL	VAL		44th	0
2018	Moto2	NTS	QAT; 22	ARG; 18	AME; 21	SPA; Ret	FRA; 17	ITA; 15	CAT; 18	NED; 20	GER; 18	CZE; 19	AUT; 18	GBR; C	RSM; 17	ARA; 18	THA; 23	JPN; 19	AUS; 17	MAL; 21	VAL; 13	28th	4
2019	Moto2	NTS	QAT	ARG	AME	SPA; 18	FRA; Ret	ITA; 22	CAT; 22	NED; 16	GER; 23	CZE; 22	AUT; 20	GBR; 25	RSM	ARA	THA	JPN	AUS	MAL	VAL	31st	0

=== Supersport World Championship ===
==== Races by year ====
(key) (Races in bold indicate pole position; races in italics indicate fastest lap)

Year	Bike	1		2		3		4		5		6		7		8		9		10		11		12		Pos	Pts
Year	Bike	R1	R2	R1	R2	R1	R2	R1	R2	R1	R2	R1	R2	R1	R2	R1	R2	R1	R2	R1	R2	R1	R2	R1	R2	Pos	Pts
2020	Yamaha	AUS; 6		SPA; 6	SPA; 8	POR; 8	POR; 4	SPA; 6	SPA; 8	SPA; Ret	SPA; 9	SPA; 6	SPA; 5	FRA; 12	FRA; 4	POR; 5	POR; 4									5th	136
2021	Yamaha	SPA; 1	SPA; 1	POR; 1	POR; Ret	ITA; 3	ITA; 5	NED; 2	NED; 13	CZE; 1	CZE; 2	SPA; 2	SPA; 2	FRA; 2	FRA; 6	SPA; 8	SPA; 7	SPA; C	SPA; 8	POR; 6	POR; 1	ARG; 4	ARG; Ret	INA; 6	INA; Ret	2nd	323
2022	Yamaha	SPA	SPA	NED	NED	POR	POR	ITA	ITA	GBR	GBR	CZE; 3	CZE; Ret	FRA	FRA	SPA	SPA	POR	POR	ARG	ARG	INA	INA	AUS	AUS	28th	16
2024	Yamaha	AUS	AUS	SPA	SPA	NED	NED	ITA	ITA	GBR	GBR	CZE; 14	CZE; 14	POR	POR	FRA	FRA	ITA	ITA							34th	5
2024	Triumph																			SPA; Ret	SPA; 15	POR	POR	SPA	SPA	34th	5

=== FIM Endurance World Championship ===
==== By team ====
Year	Team	Bike	Rider	TC
2022	(Belgium) Viltais Racing Igol	Yamaha YZF-R1	(France) Erwan Nigon (Germany) Florian Alt (South Africa) Steven Odendaal	3rd

Year	Team	Bike	Tyre	Rider	Pts	TC
2025	(Belgium) BMW Motorrad World Endurance Team	BMW S1000RR	**B**	(Germany) Markus Reiterberger (South Africa) Steven Odendaal (France) Sylvain Guintoli	70*	2nd*

=== Suzuka 8 Hours results ===
Year	Class	Team	Co-riders	Bike	Pos
2025	**EWC**	(Germany) BMW Motorrad World Endurance Team	(Netherlands) Michael van der Mark (Germany) Markus Reiterberger	BMW M1000RR	5th
2026	**EWC**	(Germany) BMW Motorrad World Endurance Team	(Netherlands) Michael van der Mark (Germany) Markus Reiterberger	BMW M1000RR	TBD
