= Suter =

Suter is a surname. Notable people with the name include:

- Alexis P. Suter (born 1963), American singer and songwriter
- Andrew Burn Suter (1830–1895), New Zealand bishop
- Andrina Suter (born 1992), Swiss dressage rider
- August Suter (1887–1965), Swiss sculptor
- Bob Suter (1957–2014), American ice hockey player
- Bob Suter (Australian footballer) (1928–2016), Australian footballer
- Bob Suter (English footballer) (1880–1945), English footballer
- Brent Suter (born 1989), American baseball player
- Corinne Suter (born 1994), Swiss Alpine skier
- Eskil Suter, Swiss motorcycle road racer and chassis constructor
- Fabienne Suter (born 1985), Swiss Alpine skier
- Fergus Suter (1857–1916), Scottish stonemason and footballer
- Gary Suter (born 1964), American ice hockey player
- Heinrich Suter (1848–1922), Swiss historian of science
- Heiri Suter (1899–1978), Swiss road racing cyclist
- Henry Suter (1841–1918), New Zealand zoologist, naturalist and paleontologist
- Hermann Suter (1870–1926) Swiss composer and conductor
- Keith Suter, Australian planning consultant and futurist
- Jasmina Suter (born 1995), Swiss alpine skier
- Juliana Suter (born 1998), Swiss Alpine skier
- Johann Rudolf Suter (1766–1827), Swiss physician, botanist and philologist
- Martin Suter (born 1948), Swiss author
- Patric Suter (born 1977), Swiss hammer thrower
- Pius Suter (born 1996), Swiss ice hockey player
- Ryan Suter (born 1985), American ice hockey player
- Steve Suter (born 1982), American football player
- Vivian Suter (born 1949), Argentine painter
- William Suter (born 1937), American jurist
