= Taiga Hada =

Japanese motorcycle racer

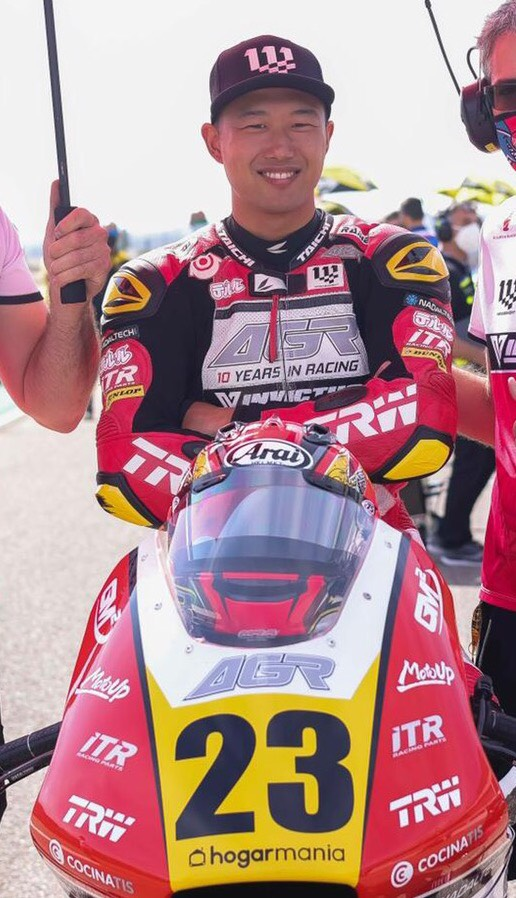
- Hada in 2020
- Nationality: Japanese
- Born: 12 September 1998 (age 28); Fujiyoshida, Japan
- Current team: Astemo Pro Honda SI Racing
- Bike number: 1
Motorcycle racing career statistics
Moto2 World Championship
Active years	2021–2023, 2025
Manufacturers	NTS, Kalex
2023 championship position	26th (4.5 pts)
Starts / Wins / Podiums / Poles / F. laps / Points; 25 / 0 / 0 / 0 / 0 / 8
All Japan JSB1000
Active years	2026–
Manufacturers	Honda (2026–)
Starts / Wins / Podiums / Poles / F. laps / Points; 1 / 0 / 0 / 0 / 0 / 11
All Japan ST1000
Active years	2025–
Manufacturers	Honda (2025–)
Championships	1
2026 championship position	2nd (113 pts)
Starts / Wins / Podiums / Poles / F. laps / Points; 11 / 5 / 8 / 0 / 5 / 176

Taiga Hada (Japanese: 羽田 太河, Hepburn: Hada Taiga; born 12 September 1998) is a Japanese Grand Prix motorcycle racer who competes in the ST1000 class of the All Japan Road Race Championship for Astemo Pro Honda SI Racing. He was crowned champion of the 2025 All Japan ST1000 class.

Hada made his Grand Prix racing debut at the 2021 Spanish Grand Prix, replacing the injured Barry Baltus.

For the 2022 season, Hada raced for Pertamina Mandalika SAG Team, replacing the retired Gabriel Rodrigo for the final eight races.

For the 2023 season, Hada again raced for the Pertamina Mandalika SAG Team starting from the Italian round. He replaced Lorenzo Dalla Porta who left the team after the first five races.

== Career statistics ==
=== Grand Prix motorcycle racing ===
==== By season ====
Season	Class	Motorcycle	Team	Race	Win	Podium	Pole	FLap	Pts	Plcd
2021	Moto2	NTS	NTS RW Racing GP	1	0	0	0	0	0	39th
2021	Moto2	Kalex	Pertamina Mandalika SAG Teluru	1	0	0	0	0	0	39th
2022	Moto2	Kalex	Pertamina Mandalika SAG Team	8	0	0	0	0	3.5	32nd
2023	Moto2	Kalex	Pertamina Mandalika SAG Team	13	0	0	0	0	4.5	26th
2025	Moto2	Kalex	Idemitsu Honda Team Asia	2	0	0	0	0	0*	33rd*
Total				**25**	**0**	**0**	**0**	**0**	**8**	

==== By class ====
Class	Seasons	1st GP	Race	Win	Podiums	Pole	FLap	Pts	WChmp
Moto2	2021–2023, 2025	2021 Spain	25	0	0	0	0	8	0
Total	2021–2023, 2025		**25**	**0**	**0**	**0**	**0**	**8**	**0**

==== Races by year ====
(key) (Races in bold indicate pole position, races in italics indicate fastest lap)

Year	Class	Bike	1	2	3	4	5	6	7	8	9	10	11	12	13	14	15	16	17	18	19	20	21	22	Pos	Pts
2021	Moto2	NTS	QAT	DOH	POR	SPA; 22	FRA	ITA	CAT	GER	NED	STY													39th	0
2021	Moto2	Kalex											AUT; 21	GBR	ARA	RSM	AME	EMI	ALR	VAL					39th	0
2022	Moto2	Kalex	QAT	INA	ARG	AME	POR	SPA	FRA	ITA	CAT	GER	NED	GBR	AUT; 22	RSM; 17	ARA; Ret	JPN; 17	THA; 13^{‡}	AUS; 15	MAL; 15	VAL; 22			32nd	3.5
2023	Moto2	Kalex	POR	ARG	AME	SPA	FRA	ITA; 21	GER; 21	NED; 21	GBR; Ret	AUT	CAT	RSM; 19	IND; 23	JPN; 19	INA; 14	AUS; 11^{‡}	THA; Ret	MAL; 16	QAT; 25	VAL; 22			26th	4.5
2025	Moto2	Kalex	THA	ARG	AME	QAT	SPA	FRA	GBR	ARA	ITA	NED	GER; 21	CZE; 24	AUT	HUN	CAT	RSM	JPN	INA	AUS	MAL	POR	VAL	34th	0

^{‡} Half points awarded as less than two thirds (2022 Thailand GP)/less than half (2023 Australian GP) of the race distance (but at least three full laps) was completed.

=== All Japan Road Race Championship ===
==== Races by year ====
(key) (Races in bold indicate pole position; races in italics indicate fastest lap)

Year	Class	Bike	1	2	3	4	5	6	Pos	Pts
2024	ST1000	Honda	MOT	SUG	**AUT1**; 1	**AUT2**; 2	OKA; 2	SUZ; 2	3rd	88
2025	ST1000	Honda	SUG; 7	MOT1; 1	MOT2; 1	AUT; 2	OKA; 1	SUZ; 3	1st	113
2026	JSB1000	Honda	MOT; 5						21st	11
2026	ST1000	Honda	SUG; 1	AUT; 1	MOT1; 4	MOT2; 1	OKA; 1	SUZ; Ret	2nd	113

=== FIM Endurance World Championship ===
Year	Team	Bike	Tyre	Rider	Pts	TC
2025	(France) F.C.C. TSR Honda	Honda CBR1000RR	**B**	(France) Alan Techer (France) Corentin Perolari (Japan) Taiga Hada	58*	4th*

==== Spa 8 Hours Motos results ====
Year	Team	Riders	Bike	Po
2025	(France) F.C.C. TSR Honda	(France) Alan Techer (France) Corentin Perolari	Honda CBR1000RR	1st

==== Suzuka 8 Hours results ====
Year	Class	Team	Co-riders	Bike	Pos
2025	**EWC**	(Japan) F.C.C. TSR Honda France	(France) Alan Techer (France) Corentin Perolari	Honda CBR1000RR	Ret
2026	**EWC**	(Japan) Astemo Pro Honda SI Racing	(Japan) Kohta Nozane (Japan) Kohta Arakawa	Honda CBR1000RR-R	20th
